= Counties 2 Durham & Northumberland =

English Rugby Union league

- Sport: Rugby union
- Instituted: 1987; 39 years ago
- Number of teams: 12
- Country: England
- Holders: Durham University (1st title) (2024-25) (promoted to Counties 1 Durham & Northumberland)
- Most titles: Ponteland (4 titles)
- Website: England RFU

North East Counties 2 (North)/(South) formerly known as Counties 2 Durham & Northumberland, and before that Durham/Northumberland 2, is an English rugby union league at the eighth tier of the domestic competition for teams from North East England. The champions and runner-up are promoted to Counties 1 Durham & Northumberland and the bottom two clubs are relegated to Counties 3 Durham & Northumberland. Each season two teams from Durham/Northumberland 2 are picked to take part in the RFU Senior Vase (a national competition for clubs at level 8) - one affiliated with the Durham County RFU, the other with the Northumberland RFU. Ponteland won their fourth title in 2020 with Sunderland also promoted.

== Participating clubs 2026-27 ==
Ahead of the new season the league was rebranded North East Counties 2 and split into North and South divisions with reserve teams entered into the competition for the first time.

Departing were champions Barnard Castle and runners-up Houghton, promoted to North East Counties 1 while Blyth (12th) were relegated to North East Counties 3 (North).

== North ==
Team	Ground	Capacity	City/Area	Previous season
Alnwick II	Greensfield	1,200 (200 in stand)	Alnwick, Northumberland	New entry
Ashington	The Recreation Ground		Ashington, Northumberland	9th
Blaydon II	Crow Trees	2,000 (400 seats)	Swalwell, Tyne and Wear	New entry
Gosforth	Broadway West		Newcastle upon Tyne, Tyne and Wear	Promoted from DN3 (runners-up)
Jarrovians	Community Centre		Hebburn, Tyne and Wear	5th
Morpeth II	Grange House Field	1,000	Morpeth, Northumberland	New entry
Northern II	McCracken Park	1,000	Gosforth, Newcastle upon Tyne, Tyne and Wear	New entry
Novocastrians II	Sutherland Park	1,150	Benton, Newcastle upon Tyne, Tyne and Wear	New entry
North Shields	Preston Playing Fields		Preston, North Shields, Tyne and Wear	8th
South Shields Westoe	Grosvenor Road		South Shields, Tyne and Wear	4th
Wallsend	Battle Hill Playing Field		Wallsend, Tyne and Wear	Promoted from DN3 (champions)
Whitley Bay Rockcliff	Lovaine Avenue		Whitley Bay, Tyne and Wear	3rd

Locations of the 2026-27 North East Counties 2 (North) teams in Northumberland
Locations of the 2026-27 North East Counties 2 (North) teams in Tyne and Wear

== South ==
Team	Ground	Capacity	City/Area	Previous season
Acklam	Talbot Park		Acklam, Middlesbrough, North Yorkshire	Relegated from DN1 (12th)
Billingham Lions	Greenwood Road	1,500 (100 seats)	Billingham, County Durham	New entry
Darlington Mowden Park II	The Darlington Arena	25,500	Darlington, County Durham	New entry
Hartlepool Rovers	New Friarage		Hartlepool, County Durham	6th
Middlesbrough II	Acklam Park	5,000 (159 seats)	Acklam, Middlesbrough, North Yorkshire	New entry
Peterlee and Horden II	Eden Lane Park		Peterlee, County Durham	New entry
Redcar	Mackinlay Park		Redcar, North Yorkshire	10th
Sedgefield	Sedgefield Cricket Club		Sedgefield, County Durham	7th
Stockton II	The Grangefield Ground		Stockton-on-Tees, County Durham	New entry
Sunderland Shipwrights	Ashbrooke Sports Club		Ashbrooke, Sunderland, Tyne and Wear	New entry
West Hartlepool Stags	Brinkburn	2,000 (76 seats)	Hartlepool, County Durham	New entry
Yarm	Wass Way		Stockton-on-Tees, County Durham	11th

Locations of the 2026-27 North East Counties 2 (South) teams

== Participating clubs 2025–26 ==
Departing were Durham University and Gateshead, promoted to Counties 1 Durham & Northumberland as champions and runners-up respectively. DMP Elizabethans (12th) would have been relegated to Counties 3 Durham & Northumberland but instead withdrew from league competition.

Team	Ground	Capacity	City/Area	Previous season
Ashington	The Recreation Ground		Ashington, Northumberland	5th
Barnard Castle	Birch Road		Barnard Castle, County Durham	6th
Blyth	Plessey Road		Blyth, Northumberland	11th
Hartlepool Rovers	New Friarage		Hartlepool, County Durham	4th
Houghton	Dairy Lane		Houghton-le-Spring, Tyne and Wear	3rd
Jarrovians	Community Centre		Hebburn, Tyne and Wear	Promoted from DN3 (champions)
North Shields	Preston Playing Fields		Preston, North Shields, Tyne and Wear	7th
Redcar	Mackinlay Park		Redcar, North Yorkshire	9th
Sedgefield	Sedgefield Cricket Club		Sedgefield, County Durham	10th
South Shields Westoe	Grosvenor Road		South Shields, Tyne and Wear	8th
Whitley Bay Rockcliff	Lovaine Avenue		Whitley Bay, Tyne and Wear	Relegated from DN1 (12th)
Yarm	Wass Way		Stockton-on-Tees, County Durham	Promoted from DN3 (runners-up)

Locations of the 2025-26 Durham/Northumberland 2 teams

== Participating clubs 2024–25 ==
Departing were Horden and Peterlee and Darlington, promoted to DN1 as champions and runners-up respectively. Whitby (11th) and Seaham (12th) were relegated to DN3.

Team	Ground	Capacity	City/Area	Previous season
Ashington	The Recreation Ground		Ashington, Northumberland	3rd
Barnard Castle	Birch Road		Barnard Castle, County Durham	7th
Blyth	Plessey Road		Blyth, Northumberland	Promoted from DN3 (runners-up)
DMP Elizabethans	Northern Echo Arena		Darlington, County Durham	8th
Durham University	Hollow Drift		Durham, County Durham	Promoted from DN3 (champions)
Gateshead	Eastwood Gardens		Gateshead, Tyne and Wear	5th
Hartlepool Rovers	New Friarage		Hartlepool, County Durham	Relegated from DN1 (11th)
Houghton	Dairy Lane		Houghton-le-Spring, Tyne and Wear	6th
North Shields	Preston Playing Fields		Preston, North Shields, Tyne and Wear	9th
Redcar	Mackinlay Park		Redcar, North Yorkshire	4th
Sedgefield	Sedgefield Cricket Club		Sedgefield, County Durham	10th
South Shields Westoe	Grosvenor Road		South Shields, Tyne and Wear	Relegated from DN1 (12th)

Locations of the 2024-25 Durham/Northumberland 2 teams

== Participating clubs 2023–24 ==
Departing were Ryton and Bishop Auckland, promoted to DN1 as champions and runners-up respectively. Winlaton Vulcans (11th) and Wallsend (12th) were relegated to DN3.

Team	Ground	Capacity	City/Area	Previous season
Ashington	The Recreation Ground		Ashington, Northumberland	4th
Barnard Castle	Birch Road		Barnard Castle, County Durham	6th
Darlington	Blackwell Meadows	3,000	Darlington, County Durham	Relegated from DN1 (11th)
DMP Elizabethans	Northern Echo Arena		Darlington, County Durham	Promoted from DN3 (runners-up)
Gateshead	Eastwood Gardens		Gateshead, Tyne and Wear	3rd
Horden and Peterlee	Eden Lane Park		Peterlee, County Durham	Relegated from DN1 (12th)
Houghton	Dairy Lane		Houghton-le-Spring, Tyne and Wear	Promoted from DN3 (champions)
North Shields	Preston Playing Fields		Preston, North Shields, Tyne and Wear	7th
Redcar	Mackinlay Park		Redcar, North Yorkshire	5th
Seaham	Seaham Leisure Centre		Seaham, County Durham	8th
Sedgefield	Sedgefield Cricket Club		Sedgefield, County Durham	9th
Whitby	Recreation Ground		Whitby, North Yorkshire	10th

Locations of the 2023-24 Durham/Northumberland 2 teams

== Participating clubs 2022–23 ==
This was the first season following the RFU Adult Competition Review.

Team	Ground	Capacity	City/Area	Previous season
Ashington	The Recreation Ground		Ashington, Northumberland	7th
Bishop Auckland	West Mills Playing Fields		Bishop Auckland, County Durham	4th
Barnard Castle	Birch Road		Barnard Castle, County Durham	11th
Gateshead	Eastwood Gardens		Gateshead, Tyne and Wear	5th
North Shields	Preston Playing Fields		Preston, North Shields, Tyne and Wear	10th
Redcar	Mackinlay Park		Redcar, North Yorkshire	9th
Ryton	Main Road		Ryton, Tyne and Wear	6th
Seaham	Seaham Leisure Centre		Seaham, County Durham	8th
Sedgefield	Sedgefield Cricket Club		Sedgefield, County Durham	13th
Wallsend	Battle Hill Playing Field		Wallsend, Tyne and Wear	Promoted from DN3N
Whitby	Recreation Ground		Whitby, North Yorkshire	12th
Winlaton Vulcans	Axwell View		Winlaton, Blaydon-on-Tyne, Tyne and Wear	14th

Locations of the 2022-23 Durham/Northumberland 2 teams

== Participating clubs 2021–22 ==
The teams competing in 2021-22 achieved their places in the league based on performances in 2019-20, the 'previous season' column in the table below refers to that season not 2020-21.

Team	Ground	Capacity	City/Area	Previous season
Ashington	The Recreation Ground		Ashington, Northumberland	7th
Bishop Auckland	West Mills Playing Fields		Bishop Auckland, County Durham	9th
Barnard Castle	Birch Road		Barnard Castle, County Durham	Relegated from DN1 (14th)
Darlington	Blackwell Meadows	3,000	Darlington, County Durham	10th
Gateshead	Eastwood Gardens		Gateshead, Tyne and Wear	Relegated from DN1 (12th)
Guisborough	Belmangate		Guisborough, North Yorkshire	3rd
Hartlepool	Mayfield Park		Hartlepool, County Durham	4th
North Shields	Preston Playing Fields		Preston, North Shields, Tyne and Wear	Relegated from DN1 (13th)
Redcar	Mackinlay Park		Redcar, North Yorkshire	Promoted from DN3 (champions)
Ryton	Main Road		Ryton, Tyne and Wear	6th
Seaham	Seaham Leisure Centre		Seaham, County Durham	Promoted from DN3 (runners-up)
Sedgefield	Sedgefield Cricket Club		Sedgefield, County Durham	11th
Whitby	Recreation Ground		Whitby, North Yorkshire	8th
Winlaton Vulcans	Axwell View		Winlaton, Blaydon-on-Tyne, Tyne and Wear	5th

Locations of the 2021-22 Durham/Northumberland 2 teams

== Season 2020–21 ==
On 30 October 2020 the RFU announced that due to the coronavirus pandemic a decision had been taken to cancel Adult Competitive Leagues (National League 1 and below) for the 2020/21 season meaning DN2 was not contested.

== Participating clubs 2019-20 ==
Team	Ground	Capacity	City/Area	Previous season
Ashington	The Recreation Ground		Ashington, Northumberland	6th
Bishop Auckland	West Mills Playing Fields		Bishop Auckland, County Durham	8th
Blyth	Plessey Road		Blyth, Northumberland	Promoted from DN3 (runners up)
Darlington	Blackwell Meadows	3,000	Darlington, County Durham	11th
Gosforth	Broadway West		Newcastle upon Tyne, Tyne and Wear	7th
Guisborough	Belmangate		Guisborough, North Yorkshire	Relegated from Yorkshire 1 (14th) (level transfer)
Hartlepool	Mayfield Park		Hartlepool, County Durham	3rd
Ponteland	Ponteland Leisure Centre		Ponteland, Tyne and Wear	Relegated from DN1 (13th)
Ryton	Main Road		Ryton, Tyne and Wear	9th
Seaton Carew	Hornby Park		Seaton Carew, County Durham	Promoted from DN3 (champions)
Sedgefield	Sedgefield Cricket Club		Sedgefield, County Durham	10th
Sunderland	Ashbrooke Sports Club		Ashbrooke, Sunderland, Tyne and Wear	4th
Whitby	Recreation Ground		Whitby, North Yorkshire	Relegated from DN1 (14th)
Winlaton Vulcans	Axwell View		Winlaton, Blaydon-on-Tyne, Tyne and Wear	5th

Locations of the 2019-20 Durham/Northumberland 2 teams

== Original teams ==
When league rugby began in 1987 this division contained the following teams:

- Bishop Auckland
- Consett
- Hartlepool
- Hartlepool B.B.O.B.
- Houghton
- North Durham
- Medicals
- Mowden Park
- Seaham
- Sunderland
- Wallsend

== Durham/Northumberland 2 honours ==
=== Durham/Northumberland 2 (1987–1993) ===
The original Durham/Northumberland 2 was a tier 10 league with promotion up to Durham/Northumberland 1 and relegation down to Durham/Northumberland 3.

Durham/Northumberland 2
Season	No of Teams	Champions	Runners–up	Relegated Teams
1987–88	11	Mowden Park	Hartlepool	Houghton
1988–89	11	Whitby	Sunderland	Hartlepool B.B.O.B.
1989–90	11	Bishop Auckland	Darlington Railway Athletic	North Shields, Wallsend
1990–91	11	Consett	Hartlepool	Billingham
1991–92	11	Percy Park	Guisborough (Note: Runners up Guisborough alongside Whitby, Seaham and West Hartlepool TDSOB were promoted due to league restructuring caused by the cancellation of Durham/Northumberland 4 at the end of season.)	No relegation (Note: Due to league restructuring caused by the cancellation of Durham/Northumberland 4 there would be no relegation this season.)
1992–93	13	North Durham	North Shields	Barnard Castle, Billingham
Green backgrounds are promotion places.

=== Durham/Northumberland 2 (1993–2000) ===
The creation of National 5 North for the 1993–94 season meant that Durham/Northumberland 2 dropped to being a tier 11 league. A further restructure at the end of the 1995–96 season saw Durham/Northumberland 2 remain at tier 11.

Durham/Northumberland 2
Season	No of Teams	Champions	Runners–up	Relegated Teams
1993–94	12	Ponteland	Wallsend	Newton Aycliffe, Seaton Carew
1994–95	13	Winlaton Vulcans	Medicals	Seaton Carew, Seghill
1995–96	13	Hartlepool	Guisborough	Multiple teams (Note: Due to restructuring six clubs, including Sedgefield, Seaham, Hartlepool B.B.O.B., Houghton, Richmondshire, Billingham, were relegated to Durham/Northumberland 3. This was done to decrease league sizes and begin home and away fixtures in order to inaugurate North East 3 and the re-introduction of Durham/Northumberland 4 for the following season.)
1996–97	10	Consett	North Durham	Wensleydale, Darlington Railway Athletic (Note: 9th placed Darlington Railway Athletic would be dissolved at the end of the season.)
1997–98	10	Billingham	Novocastrians	Seaton Carew
1998–99	9	Houghton	Seghill	Guisborough
1999–00	10	Gosforth (Note: No promotion this season as division set to increase from 10 to 12 teams for 2000-01.)	Hartlepool	Richmondshire, Chester-Le-Street, Barnard Castle
Green backgrounds are promotion places.

=== Durham/Northumberland 2 (2000–present) ===
Northern league restructuring by the RFU at the end of the 1999–2000 season saw the cancellation of North East 1, North East 2 and North East 3 (tiers 7–9). This meant that Durham/Northumberland 2 became a tier 8 league.

Durham/Northumberland 2
Season	No of Teams	Champions	Runners–up	Relegated Teams
2000–01	12	Gosforth	Billingham	Novocastrians
2001–02	12	Acklam	Hartlepool	Whitley Bay Rockcliff, Medicals
2002–03	12	Consett	Houghton	Blyth, Whitby
2003–04	12	Ryton	Ponteland	Sunderland, Barnard Castle
2004–05	12	Gateshead	North Shields	Richmondshire, Yarm
2005–06	12	Sunderland	Gosforth	Whitby, Hartlepool
2006–07	12	Wallsend	West Hartlepool T.D.S.O.B.	Seaton Carew, Blyth
2007–08	12	Ashington	Consett	Yarm, Guisborough
2008–09	12	Team Northumbria	Hartlepool (Note: Redcar, Novocastrians were also promoted. The reason for more promotions than usual was because Durham/Northumberland 1 was due to increase from 12 to 14 teams for 2009-10.)	No relegation (Note: Due to the increased number of teams being promoted from the division to Durham/Northumberland 1 there would be no relegation this season.)
2009–10	12	Ponteland	Medicals	Houghton, North Shields
2010–11	12	Guisborough	Acklam	Prudhoe & Stocksfield
2011–12	13	Blyth	Consett	Yarm, Whitby
2012–13	13	Bishop Auckland	Novocastrians	Winlaton Vulcans, Seaham
2013–14	13	Ryton	Sunderland	Prudhoe & Stocksfield, Whitby
2014–15	14	Ponteland	Acklam	Hartlepool B.B.O.B., South Tyneside College
2015–16	14	Barnard Castle	Hartlepool	Houghton, Wallsend
2016–17	14	Redcar	Ponteland	Seaton Carew, South Shields, Blyth (Note: 3 teams relegated due to relegations from higher leagues.)
2017–18	14	Acklam	Whitby	Richmondshire, Newton Aycliffe
2018–19	14	Whitley Bay Rockcliff	North Shields	South Shields, Houghton
2019–20	14	Ponteland	Sunderland	Blyth, Seaton Carew, Gosforth
2020–21	14	N/A	N/A	Uncontested due to the coronavirus pandemic
2021–22	14	Guisborough	Hartlepool	Sedgefield, Winlaton Vulcans
Green backgrounds are promotion places.				

=== Counties 2 Durham & Northumberland (2022-) ===
Counties 2 Durham & Northumberland
Season	No of Teams	Champions	Runners–up	Relegated Teams
2022-23	12	Ryton	Bishop Auckland	Winlaton Vulcans, Wallsend
2023-24	12	Horden	Darlington	Whitby, Seaham
2024-25	12	Durham University	Gateshead	DMP Elizabethans

== Number of league titles ==
- Ponteland (4)
- Consett (3)
- Ryton (3)
- Acklam (2)
- Bishop Auckland (2)
- Gosforth (2)
- Guisborough (2)
- Ashington (1)
- Barnard Castle (1)
- Blyth (1)
- Durham University (1)
- Gateshead (1)
- Guisborough (1)
- Hartlepool (1)
- Horden and Peterlee (1)
- Houghton (1)
- Mowden Park (1)

== See also ==
- Durham RFU
- Northumberland RFU
- English rugby union system
- Rugby union in England
