= Counties 3 Durham & Northumberland =

English Rugby Union league

- Sport: Rugby union
- Formerly known as: Durham/Northumberland 3
- Instituted: 1987; 39 years ago
- Inaugural season: 1987–88
- Number of teams: 11
- Country: England
- Holders: Jarrovians (2024-25)
- Most titles: Guisborough; South Shields (4 titles)
- Website: England RFU
- Promotion to: North East Counties 2 (North)/(South)

North East Counties 3 (North)/(South) formerly Counties 3 Durham & Northumberland and before that Durham/Northumberland 3, is an English rugby union league at the ninth tier of the domestic competition and is currently the basement league of club rugby in North East England. Any club in the north east wishing to join the rugby union club hierarchy must begin at the bottom so all new teams from the north east start in this division - although until 2005-06 there was relegation to the now defunct Durham/Northumberland 4. The champions and runner-up are promoted to North East Counties 2 (North)/(South).

Each season two teams from Durham/Northumberland 3 are picked to take part in the RFU Junior Vase (a national competition for clubs at levels 9-12) - one affiliated with the Durham County RFU, the other with the Northumberland RFU. Redcar won the league in 2020 with Seaham also promoted.

The division was split across two geographic areas (North & South) for the 2021–22 season as part of an RFU reorganisation of the Durham & Northumberland regional league. The experiment lasted just one season and the league was reunited in 2022-23. For the 2026-27 season the league was rebranded once more, split into North and South divisions with reserve teams entered into the competition for the first time.

== Participating clubs 2026-27 ==
Ahead of the new season the league was rebranded North East Counties 3 and the North and South divisions last used in season 2021-22 were reintroduced as reserve sides joined the league for the first time.

Departing were Wallsend and Gosforth promoted to North East Counties 2 (North) as champions and runners-up respectively. Also departing were Whitby who were reallocated to Counties 4 Yorkshire A.

== North ==
South Shields Westoe II were initially placed in the league but withdrew before the season began and were replaced by Darlington Mowden Park III.

Team	Ground	Capacity	City/Area	Previous season
Blyth	Plessey Road		Blyth, Northumberland	Relegated from Counties 2 D&N
Consett II	Amethyst Park		Consett, County Durham	New entry
Darlington Mowden Park III	The Darlington Arena	25,500	Darlington, County Durham	New entry
Durham City II	Hollow Drift	3,000 (500 seats)	Durham, County Durham	New entry
Gateshead II	Eastwood Gardens		Gateshead, Tyne and Wear	New entry
Houghton II	Dairy Lane		Houghton-le-Spring, Tyne and Wear	New entry
Percy Park II	Preston Avenue		North Shields, Tyne and Wear	New entry
Ryton II	Main Road		Ryton, Tyne and Wear	New entry
Seaham	Seaham Leisure Centre		Seaham, County Durham	4th
Washington	The Big Arch Stadium	40599(standing room only)	Washington, Tyne and Wear	Re-entry

Locations of the 2026-27 North East Counties 3 North teams

== South ==
Team	Ground	Capacity	City/Area	Previous season
Billingham III	Greenwood Road	1,500 (100 seats)	Billingham, County Durham	New entry
Bishop Auckland II	West Mills Playing Fields		Bishop Auckland, County Durham	New entry
Darlington Bulls	Blackwell Meadows	3,000	Darlington, County Durham	New entry
Guisborough II	Belmangate		Guisborough, North Yorkshire	New entry
Hartlepool II	Mayfield Park		Hartlepool, County Durham	New entry
Hartlepool BBOB	Moor Terrace		Hartlepool, County Durham	Re-entry
Middlesbrough III	Acklam Park	5,000 (159 seats)	Acklam, Middlesbrough, North Yorkshire	New entry
Newton Aycliffe	Newton Aycliffe Sports Club		Newton Aycliffe, County Durham	5th
Upper Eden II	Pennine Park		Kirkby Stephen, Cumbria	New entry
West Hartlepool III	Brinkburn	2,000 (76 seats)	Hartlepool, County Durham	New entry

Locations of the 2026-27 North East Counties 3 South teams

== Participating clubs 2025–26 ==
Departing were Jarrovians and Yarm promoted to Counties 2 Durham & Northumberland as champions and runners-up respectively. Seghill (7th), Winlaton Vulcans (8th) and Seaton Carew (10th) did not return for the new season.

In January 2026 South Shields, who had re-joined the league pyramid for the first time since season 2021-22, withdrew leaving just five clubs to contest the remaining fixtures.

Team	Ground	Capacity	City/Area	Previous season
Gosforth	Broadway West		Newcastle upon Tyne, Tyne and Wear	6th
Newton Aycliffe	Newton Aycliffe Sports Club		Newton Aycliffe, County Durham	9th
Seaham	Seaham Leisure Centre		Seaham, County Durham	5th
Wallsend	Battle Hill Playing Field		Wallsend, Tyne and Wear	3rd
Whitby	Recreation Ground		Whitby, North Yorkshire	4th

Locations of the 2025-26 Durham/Northumberland 3 teams

== Participating clubs 2024–25 ==
Departing were Durham University and Blyth promoted to DN2 as champions and runners-up respectively.

Prudhoe & Stocksfield (11th in 2023–24) started the campaign but subsequently withdrew leaving 10 teams to complete the league fixtures.

Team	Ground	Capacity	City/Area	Previous season
Gosforth	Broadway West		Newcastle upon Tyne, Tyne and Wear	4th
Jarrovians	Community Centre		Hebburn, Tyne and Wear	9th
Newton Aycliffe	Newton Aycliffe Sports Club		Newton Aycliffe, County Durham	8th
Seaham	Seaham Leisure Centre		Seaham, County Durham	Relegated from DN2 (12th)
Seaton Carew	Hornby Park		Seaton Carew, County Durham	10th
Seghill	Welfare Park		Cramlington, Northumberland	5th
Wallsend	Battle Hill Playing Field		Wallsend, Tyne and Wear	3rd
Whitby	Recreation Ground		Whitby, North Yorkshire	Relegated from DN2 (11th)
Winlaton Vulcans	Axwell View		Winlaton, Blaydon-on-Tyne, Tyne and Wear	6th
Yarm	Wass Way		Stockton-on-Tees, County Durham	7th

Locations of the 2024-25 Durham/Northumberland 3 teams

== Participating clubs 2023–24 ==
Departing were Houghton and DMP Elizabethans promoted to DN2 as champions and runners-up respectively.

Team	Ground	Capacity	City/Area	Previous season
Blyth	Plessey Road		Blyth, Northumberland	6th
Durham University	Hollow Drift		Durham, County Durham	New entry
Gosforth	Broadway West		Newcastle upon Tyne, Tyne and Wear	3rd
Jarrovians	Community Centre		Hebburn, Tyne and Wear	8th
Newton Aycliffe	Newton Aycliffe Sports Club		Newton Aycliffe, County Durham	Re-entry
Prudhoe & Stocksfield	Stocksfield Sports Ground		Stocksfield, Northumberland	7th
Seaton Carew	Hornby Park		Seaton Carew, County Durham	4th
Seghill	Welfare Park		Cramlington, Northumberland	9th
Wallsend	Battle Hill Playing Field		Wallsend, Tyne and Wear	Relegated from DN2 (12th)
Winlaton Vulcans	Axwell View		Winlaton, Blaydon-on-Tyne, Tyne and Wear	Relegated from DN2 (11th)
Yarm	Wass Way		Stockton-on-Tees, County Durham	5th

Locations of the 2023–24 Durham/Northumberland 3 teams

== Participating clubs 2022–23 ==
This was the first season following the RFU Adult Competition Review.

Leaving the league were South Shields, Richmondshire and West Hartlepool T.D.S.O.B. who had all withdrawn from the league before or during the 2021-22 season, together with West End RFC (6th DN3N). Wallsend were promoted to DN2.

Team	Ground	Capacity	City/Area	Previous season
Blyth	Plessey Road		Blyth, Northumberland	3rd DN3N
DMP Elizabethans	Northern Echo Arena		Darlington, County Durham	1st DN3S
Gosforth	Broadway West		Newcastle upon Tyne, Tyne and Wear	5th DN3N
Houghton	Dairy Lane		Houghton-le-Spring, Tyne and Wear	3rd DN3S
Jarrovians	Community Centre		Hebburn, Tyne and Wear	7th DN3N
Prudhoe & Stocksfield	Stocksfield Sports Ground		Stocksfield, Northumberland	4th DN3N
Seaton Carew	Hornby Park		Seaton Carew, County Durham	4th DN3S
Seghill	Welfare Park		Cramlington, Northumberland	2nd DN3N
Yarm	Wass Way		Stockton-on-Tees, County Durham	2nd DN3S

Locations of the 2022-23 Durham/Northumberland 3 teams

== Participating clubs 2021–22 ==
Jarrovians rejoined the (North) league having withdrawn from DN3 in 2019–20.

Ahead of the new season Newton Aycliffe (5th in 2019-20) and West Hartlepool T.D.S.O.B. (9th in 2019-20) withdrew from DN3 (South).

In November 2021 South Shields withdrew, meaning the (North) league was completed with 7 teams in 2021–22.

In January 2022 Richmondshire RUFC (10th in 2019-20) also withdrew, meaning the (South) league was completed with 4 teams in 2021–22.

The teams competing in 2021–22 achieved their places in the league based on performances in 2019–20, the positions in brackets refer to that season not 2020–21.

=== North ===
Team	Ground	Capacity	City/Area	Previous season
Blyth	Plessey Road		Blyth, Northumberland	Relegated from DN2 (14th)
Gosforth	Broadway West		Newcastle upon Tyne, Tyne and Wear	Relegated from DN2 (12th)
Jarrovians	Community Centre		Hebburn, Tyne and Wear	Re-entry
Prudhoe & Stocksfield	Stocksfield Sports Ground		Stocksfield, Northumberland	8th
Seghill	Welfare Park		Cramlington, Northumberland	6th
Wallsend	Battle Hill Playing Field		Wallsend, Tyne and Wear	3rd
West End	Tower View		Benwell, Tyne and Wear	New entry

Locations of the 2021-22 Durham/Northumberland 3 North teams in Tyne & Wear and Northumberland

=== South ===
Team	Ground	Capacity	City/Area	Previous season
DMP Elizabethans	Northern Echo Arena		Darlington, County Durham	New entry
Houghton	Dairy Lane		Houghton-le-Spring, Tyne and Wear	4th
Seaton Carew	Hornby Park		Seaton Carew, County Durham	Relegated from DN2 (13th)
Yarm	Wass Way		Stockton-on-Tees, County Durham	7th

Locations of the 2021-22 D/N3 South teams in Tyne & Wear & County Durham

== Season 2020–21 ==
On 30 October 2020 the RFU announced that due to the coronavirus pandemic a decision had been taken to cancel Adult Competitive Leagues (National League 1 and below) for the 2020/21 season meaning DN3 was not contested.

== Participating clubs 2019–20 ==
Team	Ground	Capacity	City/Area	Previous season
Houghton	Dairy Lane		Houghton-le-Spring, Tyne and Wear	Relegated from DN2 (13th)
Newton Aycliffe	Newton Aycliffe Sports Club		Newton Aycliffe, County Durham	5th
Prudhoe & Stocksfield	Stocksfield Sports Ground		Stocksfield, Northumberland	9th
Redcar	Mackinlay Park		Redcar, North Yorkshire	Relegated from DN2 (12th)
Richmondshire	Theakston Lane		Richmond, North Yorkshire	4th
Seaham	Seaham Leisure Centre		Seaham, County Durham	7th
Seghill	Welfare Park		Cramlington, Northumberland	8th
South Shields	Grosvenor Road		South Shields, Tyne and Wear	Relegated from DN2 (14th)
Wallsend	Battle Hill Playing Field		Wallsend, Tyne and Wear	10th
West Hartlepool T.D.S.O.B.	John Howard Park		Hartlepool, County Durham	6th
Yarm	Wass Way		Stockton-on-Tees, County Durham	3rd

Locations of the 2019-20 Durham/Northumberland 3 teams

== Original teams ==
When league rugby began in 1987 this division contained the following teams:

- Billingham
- Chester-le-Street
- Darlington RA
- Guisborough
- Hartlepool TDSOB
- North Shields
- Seaton Carew
- Washington
- Wearside
- Whitby

== Durham/Northumberland 3 Honours ==
=== Durham/Northumberland 3 (1987–1993) ===
The original Durham/Northumberland 3 was a tier 11 league with promotion up to Durham/Northumberland 2 and relegation down to Durham/Northumberland 4 until the end of the 1991–92 season when that division was cancelled.

Durham/Northumberland 3
Season	No of Teams	Champions	Runners–up	Relegated Teams
1987–88	10	Whitby	Billingham	Washington (Note: Relegated side Washington would drop out of the Durham/Northumberland leagues at the end of the season, re-entering Durham/Northumberland 4 for the 1990–91 season.)
1988–89	10	Darlington Railway Athletic	North Shields	No relegation
1989–90	11	Barnard Castle	Seaton Carew	Prudhoe Hospital, Wearside
1990–91	11	Guisborough	West Hartlepool T.D.S.O.B.	Civil Service Durham
1991–92	11	Chester-le-Street	Wallsend (Note: Due to restructuring caused by the cancellation of Durham/Northumberland 4, runners up Wallsend were promoted to Durham/Northumberland 2, along with North Shields, Houghton, Billingham, South Tyneside College and Wensleydale.)	No relegation (Note: Due to restructuring caused by the cancellation of Durham/Northumberland 4, no clubs were relegated. The remaining eight clubs in Durham/Northumberland 4 were promoted into Durham/Northumberland 3 for the following season.)
1992–93	11	Newton Aycliffe	Hartlepool B.B.O.B.	No relegation
Green backgrounds are promotion places.

=== Durham/Northumberland 3 (1993–2000) ===
The creation of National 5 North for the 1993–94 season meant that Durham/Northumberland 3 dropped to being a tier 12 league. A further restructure at the end of the 1995–96 season saw Durham/Northumberland 3 remain at tier 12. The reintroduction of Durham/Northumberland 4, meant that relegation returned for the 1996–97 season.

Durham/Northumberland 3
Season	No of Teams	Champions	Runners–up	Relegated Teams
1993–94	10	Billingham	Richmondshire	No relegation
1994–95	10	Barnard Castle	Sedgefield	No relegation
1995–96	12	South Tyneside College	Seaton Carew	Multiple teams (Note: Due to restructuring of the leagues, seven clubs including Prudhoe Hospital, Durham Constabulary, Washington, Hartlepool Athletic, Newton Aycliffe, Jarrovians were relegated to the reintroduced Durham/Northumberland 4 (Alston Moor folded at the end of the season). This was also done to decrease league sizes and begin home and away fixtures in order to inaugurate North East 3 the following season.)
1996–97	8	Billingham	Seghill	Wearside
1997–98	9	Gosforth	Houghton	No relegation
1998–99	10	Wallsend	Richmondshire	Hartlepool B.B.O.B.
1999–00	9	Guisborough (Note: Guisborough were not promoted despite being champions as the division was to increase from 9 to 12 teams for the following season.)	Seaton Carew	Hartlepool Athletic, Seaham
Green backgrounds are promotion places.

=== Durham/Northumberland 3 (2000–present) ===
Northern league restructuring by the RFU at the end of the 1999–2000 season saw the cancellation of North East 1, North East 2 and North East 3 (tiers 7–9). This meant that Durham/Northumberland 3 became a tier 9 league. Relegation continued to Durham/Northumberland 4 until that division was abolished at the end of the 2005–06 season.

Durham/Northumberland 3
Season	No of Teams	Champions	Runners–up	Relegated Teams	
2000–01	12	Guisborough	Barnard Castle	Durham Constabulary	
2001–02	12	Novocastrians	Seaton Carew	Newton Aycliffe, Wensleydale	
2002–03	12	Ponteland	Yarm	Wearside Samurai, Jarrovians	
2003–04	12	Richmondshire	Whitby	West Hartlepool Amateurs, Hartlepool Athletic	
2004–05	10	Sunderland	Whitley Bay Rockcliff	Seaham, South Tyneside College	
2005–06	10	Blyth	Yarm	No relegation (Note: No relegation as Durham/Northumberland 4 to be abolished for the following season.)	
2006–07	13	Medicals	Barnard Castle	No relegation	
2007–08	11	Hartlepool	Team Northumbria	No relegation	
2008–09	11	Seaton Carew	Bishop Auckland	No relegation	
2009–10	12	Guisborough	Prudhoe & Stocksfield	No relegation	
2010–11	11	North Shields	Whitby	No relegation	
2011–12	11	Prudhoe & Stocksfield	Seaham	No relegation	
2012–13	12	Hartlepool B.B.O.B.	Whitby	No relegation	
2013–14	12	South Tyneside College	Winlaton Vulcans	No relegation	
2014–15	12	Whitby	Houghton	No relegation	
2015–16	13	South Shields	Sedgefield	No relegation	
2016–17	12	Newton Aycliffe	Richmondshire	No relegation	
2017–18	12	South Shields	Houghton	No relegation	
2018–19	10 (Note: Division reduced from 12 to 10 teams after Jarrovians and Chester-le-Street pull out.)	Seaton Carew	Blyth	No relegation	
2019–20	11	Redcar	Seaham	No relegation	
2020–21	11	N/A	N/A	Uncontested due to the coronavirus pandemic	
2021–22	11	Wallsend	DMP Elizabethans	No relegation	
Green backgrounds are promotion places.					-->

=== Counties 3 Durham & Northumberland (2022-) ===
Counties 3 Durham & Northumberland
Season	No of Teams	Champions	Runners–up	Relegated Teams
2022-23	9	Houghton	DMP Elizabethans	No relegation
2023-24	11	Durham University	Blyth	No relegation
2024-25	10	Jarrovians	Yarm	No relegation

== Number of league titles ==
- Guisborough (4)
- South Shields (Note: South Tyneside College changed their name to South Shields in 2015.) (4)
- Barnard Castle (2)
- Billingham (2)
- Newton Aycliffe (2)
- Seaton Carew (2)
- Wallsend (2)
- Whitby (2)
- Blyth (1)
- Chester-le-Street (1)
- Darlington Railway Athletic (1)
- Durham University (1)
- Gosforth (1)
- Hartlepool (1)
- Hartlepool B.B.O.B. (1)
- Houghton (1)
- Jarrovians (1)
- Medicals (1)
- North Shields (1)
- Novocastrians (1)
- Ponteland (1)
- Prudhoe & Stocksfield (1)
- Redcar (1)
- Richmondshire (1)
- Sunderland (1)

== See also ==
- Durham RFU
- Northumberland RFU
- English rugby union system
- Rugby union in England
