= Gareth Maclure =

- Born: Gareth Roderick Maclure; 17 December 1979 (age 46) Bury, England
- Height: 1.94 m (6 ft 4 in)
- Weight: 97 kg (15 st 4 lb)

Rugby union career
- Position: Wing
Amateur team(s)
Years	Team	Apps	(Points)
- Chester-le-Street
1998-99	GHA		
Senior career
Years	Team	Apps	(Points)
1998-99	West Hartlepool	9	(10)
1999−2003	Newcastle Falcons	23	(20)
2003−05	Glasgow Warriors	25	(15)

Gareth Maclure (born 17 December 1979 in Bury, England) is a former professional rugby union footballer. His regular playing position was on the wing. He previously played for Glasgow Warriors and Newcastle Falcons.

Maclure played at amateur level with Chester-le-Street and West Hartlepool before signing with Newcastle Falcons. Whilst at Newcastle he was a replacement in the final of the 2001 Anglo-Welsh Cup which Newcastle won.

From there, Maclure moved to Glasgow Warriors. He played for amateur side GHA when not needed by the Warriors.

Maclure left the Warriors in 2005.
