= Durham County RFU Senior Cup =

English rugby union competition

- Sport: Rugby Union
- Instituted: 1880; 146 years ago
- Number of teams: 4
- Country: England
- Holders: Durham City (20th title) (2023-24)
- Most titles: Hartlepool Rovers (45 titles)
- Website: Durham County RFU

The Durham County RFU Senior Cup is an annual rugby union knock-out club competition organized by the Durham County Rugby Football Union. It was first introduced during the 1880-81 season, with the inaugural winners being Sunderland Rovers (a forerunner to Sunderland RFC) who defeated Houghton 3 tries to 0 in the final. (Note: The HHTandN website rather confusingly has both Sunderland and Houghton listed as winners at various parts of the site. A subsequent visit to the Sunderland RFC website revealed that Sunderland were in fact the first Durham Senior Cup winners.)

During the 1880s the competition used the archaic rugby union points systems of games being scored by goals, which were seen as more important than tries back then. It was only if both teams had not scored any goals, that tries would then be used to determine games, with the highest number winning. By the 1890s this system was changed to one which we are more familiar with today, using tries, conversions, drop goals (and later penalties). Today, the Durham Senior Cup remains the most important rugby union cup competition for club sides in County Durham, ahead of the Intermediate Cup, Junior Cup and Plate competitions.

The Senior Cup is currently open to club sides based in County Durham and occasionally, Tyne and Wear, who play between tier 3 (National League 1) and tier 5 (North Premier) of the English rugby union league system, although higher ranked clubs tend to field reserve sides due to the demands of league rugby. The current format is a knockout cup with a semi-finals and a final to be held at the ground of one of the finalists. Previously the cup final was held at a pre-determined venue but this has changed in recent seasons.

== Durham County RFU Senior Cup winners ==
Durham County RFU Senior Cup Finals
| Season | Winner | Score (Note: Note that up until 1890-91, the old rugby union points system was used, where results were judged on first who scored the most goals, and then on tries. For these years the goals come first with the tries following in brackets. For example the score 1(1)-0(1) would stand for team one scoring 1 goal and 1 try, while team two has scored no goals and one try, making team one the victor.) | Runners–up | Venue |
| 1880-81 | Sunderland Rovers | 0(3)-0(0) | Houghton | The Blue House Field, Sunderland |
| 1881-82 | Houghton | 0(1)-0(0) | Westoe | |
| 1882-83 | North Durham | 1(1)-0(0) | Ryton | |
| 1883-84 | Hartlepool Rovers | 0(2)-0(1) | North Durham | |
| 1884-85 | Durham City | 1(4)-0(0) | Sunderland Rovers | |
| 1885-86 | No competition | | | |
| 1886-87 | Hartlepool Rovers | 2(3)-0(0) | Humbledon | |
| 1887-88 | Durham City | 1(0)-0(0) | Hartlepool Rovers | |
| 1888-89 | Hartlepool Rovers | 1(3)-0(0) | Durham City | |
| 1889-90 | Hartlepool Rovers | 6(2)-1(0) | Hartlepool Rangers | |
| 1890-91 | Hartlepool Rovers | 2(1)-0(2) | Houghton | |
| 1891-92 | Tudhoe | 2-0 | Hartlepool Rovers | Ashbrooke, Sunderland |
| 1892-93 | Tudhoe | W-O (Note: Tudoe won the 1892-93 final via walkover.) | Hartlepool Rovers | |
| 1893-94 | Hartlepool Rovers | 15-3 | Tudhoe | Wood Terrace, South Shields |
| 1894-95 | Westoe | 3-0 | West Hartlepool | Ashbrooke, Sunderland |
| 1895-96 | Hartlepool Rovers | 7-0 | Westoe | |
| 1896-97 | Hartlepool Rovers | 12-0 | Sunderland | |
| 1897-98 | Tudhoe | 6-0 | Hartlepool Rovers | |
| 1898-99 | Tudhoe | 9-0 | West Hartlepool | Ashbrooke, Sunderland |
| 1899-1900 | West Hartlepool | 6-3 | Tudhoe | Wood Terrace, South Shields |
| 1900-01 | Westoe | 6-0 | West Hartlepool | Brewery Field, Spennymoor |
| 1901-02 | West Hartlepool | 12-0 | Hartlepool Rovers | Hollow Drift, Durham |
| 1902-03 | Sunderland | 8-5 | West Hartlepool | Wood Terrace, South Shields |
| 1903-04 | West Hartlepool | 9-3 | Sunderland | Wood Terrace, South Shields |
| 1904-05 | Hartlepool Rovers | 19-4 | Durham City | Ashbrooke, Sunderland |
| 1905-06 | Hartlepool Rovers | 21-5 | West Hartlepool | Ashbrooke, Sunderland |
| 1906-07 | Hartlepool Rovers | 8-0 | West Hartlepool | Ashbrooke, Sunderland |
| 1907-08 | Hartlepool Rovers | 8-0 | Durham City | Ashbrooke, Sunderland |
| 1908-09 | Hartlepool Rovers | 9-0 | Durham City | Ashbrooke, Sunderland |
| 1909-10 | Durham City | 3-0 | Hartlepool Rovers | Ashbrooke, Sunderland |
| 1910-11 | Hartlepool Rovers | 25-3 | Durham City | Ashbrooke, Sunderland |
| 1911-12 | Hartlepool Rovers | 9-3 | Durham City | Ashbrooke, Sunderland |
| 1912-13 | Hartlepool Rovers | 11-0 | North Durham | Ashbrooke, Sunderland |
| 1913-14 | Westoe | 9-0 | Winlaton Vulcans | |
| 1915-19 | No competition due to World War I | | | |
| 1919-20 | Hartlepool Rovers | 19-8 | North Durham | |
| 1920-21 | Durham City | 9-6 | Hartlepool Rovers | |
| 1921-22 | Hartlepool Rovers | 21-8 | Durham City | |
| 1922-23 | Hartlepool Rovers | 23-13 | Ryton | Wood Terrace, South Shields |
| 1923-24 | Hartlepool Rovers | 15-7 | Ryton | Wood Terrace, South Shields |
| 1924-25 | Hartlepool Rovers | 43-5 | Winlaton Vulcans | |
| 1925-26 | Hartlepool Rovers | 6-5 | Blaydon | Ashbrooke, Sunderland |
| 1926-27 | Ryton | 10-5 | Sunderland | Eastwood Gardens, Gateshead |
| 1927-28 | Sunderland | 17-8 | Durham City | |
| 1928-29 | Durham City | 9-3 | West Hartlepool | Ashbrooke, Sunderland |
| 1929-30 | Hartlepool Rovers | 11-3 | North Durham | Ashbrooke, Sunderland |
| 1930-31 | Sunderland | 14-9 | Durham City | Crow Trees, Swalwell |
| 1931-32 | Durham City | 22-3 | Hartlepool Rovers | Ashbrooke, Sunderland |
| 1932-33 | Durham City | 13-5 | West Hartlepool | Ashbrooke, Sunderland |
| 1933-34 | Durham City | 13-3 | Westoe | Ashbrooke, Sunderland |
| 1934-35 | Hartlepool Rovers | 8-6 | Westoe | Ashbrooke, Sunderland |
| 1935-36 | Durham City | 10-3 | Westoe | Ashbrooke, Sunderland |
| 1936-37 | Westoe | 7-0 | Durham City | Ashbrooke, Sunderland |
| 1937-38 | North Durham | 4-3 | Westoe | Ashbrooke, Sunderland |
| 1938-39 | Hartlepool Rovers | 6-5 | Durham City | Ashbrooke, Sunderland |
| 1939-45 | No competition due to World War II | | | |
| 1946-47 | Hartlepool Rovers | 16-8 | Billingham | |
| 1947-48 | Hartlepool Rovers | 14-0 | Sunderland | |
| 1948-49 | West Hartlepool | 11-0 (Note: The 1948-49 final was originally a 0-0 draw prompting a replay which West Hartlepool won 11-0 over Westoe.) | Westoe | |
| 1949-50 | Westoe | 6-0 | Sunderland | |
| 1950-51 | Westoe | 8-0 | Billingham | |
| 1951-52 | West Hartlepool | 11-6 (Note: The 1951-52 final was originally a 0-0 draw prompting a replay which West Hartlepool won 11-0 over Westoe.) | Westoe | |
| 1952-53 | Durham City | 11-9 | Hartlepool Rovers | |
| 1953-54 | Hartlepool Rovers | 5-3 | Westoe | |
| 1954-55 | West Hartlepool | 8-3 | Westoe | |
| 1955-56 | Westoe | 8-0 | Gateshead Fell | |
| 1956-57 | Durham City | 9-3 | Westoe | |
| 1957-58 | Durham City | 9-5 | Billingham | |
| 1958-59 | Sunderland | 6-3 | Durham City | |
| 1959-60 | Hartlepool Rovers | 22-9 | Blaydon | |
| 1960-61 | Hartlepool Rovers | 28-6 | Durham City | |
| 1961-62 | Durham City | 9-0 | Hartlepool Rovers | |
| 1962-63 | Durham City | 9-3 | Blaydon | New Friarage, Hartlepool |
| 1963-64 | Durham City | 20-6 | Stockton | Ashbrooke, Sunderland |
| 1964-65 | Durham City | 17-0 | Hartlepool Rovers | Ashbrooke, Sunderland |
| 1965-66 | Durham City | 8-0 | Hartlepool Rovers | Ashbrooke, Sunderland |
| 1966-67 | Durham City | 17-9 | Hartlepool Rovers | |
| 1967-68 | Hartlepool Rovers | 17-10 | Durham City | |
| 1968-69 | Hartlepool Rovers | 17-9 | Durham City | |
| 1969-70 | Hartlepool Rovers | 19-6 | West Hartlepool | |
| 1970-71 | West Hartlepool | 14-3 | Durham City | |
| 1971-72 | West Hartlepool | 4-0 | Durham City | |
| 1972-73 | Hartlepool Rovers | 14-0 | Blaydon | |
| 1973-74 | Hartlepool Rovers | 13-4 | West Hartlepool | |
| 1974-75 | Hartlepool Rovers | 3-0 | Blaydon | |
| 1975-76 | Hartlepool Rovers | 23-8 | Durham City | |
| 1976-77 | Hartlepool Rovers | 38-6 | Durham University | |
| 1977-78 | Hartlepool Rovers | 16-6 | Blaydon | |
| 1978-79 | Hartlepool Rovers | 11-6 | Westoe | |
| 1979-80 | Hartlepool Rovers | 4-3 | West Hartlepool | |
| 1980-81 | Hartlepool Rovers | 15-6 | West Hartlepool | |
| 1981-82 | West Hartlepool | 12-10 | Hartlepool Rovers | |
| 1982-83 | West Hartlepool | 32-12 | Durham City | |
| 1983-84 | West Hartlepool | 16-13 | Hartlepool Rovers | |
| 1984-85 | West Hartlepool | 35-6 | Westoe | |
| 1985-86 | West Hartlepool | 33-6 | Gateshead Fell | |
| 1986-87 | Hartlepool Rovers | 15-12 | West Hartlepool | |
| 1987-88 | Durham City | 18-9 | Stockton | |
| 1988-89 | West Hartlepool | 19-6 | Hartlepool Rovers | |
| 1989-90 | Hartlepool Rovers | 13-6 | Durham City | |
| 1990-91 | Stockton | 10-7 | Gateshead Fell | |
| 1991-92 | Hartlepool Rovers | 7-0 | Blaydon | |
| 1992-93 | Stockton | 24-13 | Hartlepool Rovers | |
| 1993-94 | Stockton | 16-14 | Hartlepool Rovers | |
| 1994-95 | Stockton | 19-0 | Horden | |
| 1995-96 | Blaydon | 22-3 | Darlington | |
| 1996-97 | Stockton | 50-11 | Sunderland | |
| 1997-98 | Darlington Mowden Park | 23-10 | West Hartlepool T.D.S.O.B. | New Friarage, Hartlepool |
| 1998-99 | Darlington Mowden Park | 37-15 | Blaydon | |
| 1999-2000 | Darlington Mowden Park | 26-9 | Darlington | |
| 2000-01 | Darlington | 33-19 | Blaydon | |
| 2001-02 | Darlington | 34-22 | Darlington Mowden Park | |
| 2002-03 | Darlington Mowden Park | 48-16 | Westoe | |
| 2003-04 | Blaydon | 28-20 | Darlington | Hollow Drift, Durham |
| 2004-05 | Darlington | 48-16 | Westoe | |
| 2005-06 | Blaydon | W-O (Note: Blaydon won the 2005-06 final via walkover after Westoe withdrew from the replay, with the sides having originally played out a 30-30 draw.) | Westoe | Main Road, Ryton |
| 2006-07 | Darlington Mowden Park | 52-15 | Blaydon | |
| 2007-08 | Westoe | 36-33 | Darlington | |
| 2008-09 | No competition | | | |
| 2009-10 | Blaydon | N/A (Note: The 2009-10 Senior Cup was awarded to Blaydon after an enquiry.) | | |
| 2010-11 | Competition not completed | | | |
| 2011-12 | Competition not completed | | | |
| 2012-13 | Blaydon | W-O (Note: Blaydon won the 2012-13 final via walkover after Darlington Mowden Park withdrew.) | Darlington Mowden Park | |
| 2013-14 | Billingham | 42-22 | Westoe | Hollow Drift, Durham |
| 2014-15 | West Hartlepool | 20-3 | Westoe | Hollow Drift, Durham |
| 2015-16 | Darlington Mowden Park | 65-10 | Billingham | Greenwood Road, Billingham |
| 2016-17 | Darlington Mowden Park | 64-5 | West Hartlepool | Northern Echo Arena, Darlington |
| 2017-23 | Competition suspended | | | |
| 2023-24 | Durham City | 32-10 | Consett | Consett |
| 2024-25 | Consett | W/O | Blaydon | Blaydon |

== Number of wins ==
- Hartlepool Rovers (45)
- Durham City (20)
- West Hartlepool (15)
- Westoe (8) (Note: Westoe are currently known as South Shields Westoe.)
- Darlington Mowden Park (7)
- Blaydon (5)
- Stockton (5)
- Sunderland (5) (Note: Sunderland's cup wins includes 1 by Sunderland Rovers, an early incarnation of the modern club.)
- Tudhoe (4)
- Darlington (3)
- North Durham (2)
- Billingham (1)
- Houghton (1)
- Ryton (1)

== See also ==
- Durham County RFU
- Intermediate Cup
- Junior Cup
- Plate
- English rugby union system
- Rugby union in England
