= South Shields Westoe RFC =

English rugby union club, based in South Shields, Tyne and Wear

Westoe RFC
- Full name: Westoe RFC
- Union: Durham County RFU
- Founded: 1875; 151 years ago
- Location: South Shields, Tyne and Wear, England
- Ground: Wood Terrace
- Chairman: Paul Henry
- Coach(es): Forwards coach - Rob Scorer, Backs coach - Austin De Waal
- Captain: Rhys Reynolds
- League: Durham/Northumberland 2
- 2024-25: 8th
Team kit

Official website
- southshieldswestoeclub.co.uk/westoe-rfc-home/

Westoe RFC is a Rugby Union Football Club which currently plays in Durham/Northumberland 2 (tier 8 of the English rugby union system) at Wood Terrace, South Shields. The club changed its name from Westoe RFC to South Shields Westoe RFC in August 2015, using the new name from the 2015-16 season onwards.

== History ==
A family club where sons followed fathers and a traditional club, with a historical seafaring influence through the marine faculty at the college nearby Westoe RFC is South Shields' longest established rugby club. Originally formed in 1875, the club has been on the same ground at Wood Terrace since its formation, after it agreed to level the former ridge and furrow farmland for sub rent with the local cricket club. It has shared the Wood Terrace ground with South Shields Cricket club to this day.

The club was formed when Charlie Green and his friends, all aged 16 to 19, crossed the River Tyne on the Tyne ferry after winning a match against Tynemouth, a prominent local rugby club at the time.

In 2005, South Shields Westoe RFC, to the interest of South Shields, had a notable Intermediate Cup run. In the semi-final, being the underdogs, they beat much fancied Staines for a passage to Twickenham the national stadium, taking many travelling fans. Unfortunately in the final the first team were beaten by giants Morley R.F.C. from Yorkshire. In the same 2004/05 season the defensive side finished champions in the Division North 2, an achievement for the club.

Westoe RFC gained national league status in the 2008/2009 season after beating Beverley to ensure promotion. They will now play in National 2 North for the first time in its history.

== First team ==
In 2009/10, the club’s first team competes in the English rugby union league and plays in the National League Two North after being crowned champions of the Northern League One in the 2008/09 season, the first time the club has been in this division.

=== First team honours ===
- Durham Senior Cup winners (9): 1882, 1895, 1901, 1914, 1937, 1950, 1951, 1956, 2008
- North East 3 champions: 1999–00
- Durham/Northumberland 1 champions: 2000–01
- North 1 East champions: 2004–05
- Intermediate Cup Runners up 2005
- North Division 1 champions: 2007–08

== Second team ==
In 2026 a decision was taken to allow non 1st XV teams into the league structure and the 2nd XV was placed in Counties 3 Durham & Northumberland North.

== Notable current and former players ==
- James Gowans, a Scotland international player.
- Joe Gray. Flanker and Henry Pollock impersonator.
- Joe Shaw, a Newcastle Falcons player
- David Wilson, a Bath prop and also an England international
- Katy McLean, Darlington Mowden Park R.F.C. and England Women's National Rugby Union Team
