= North East Counties 1 =

English amateur rugby union competition

- Current season or competition: 2026–27 season
- Sport: Rugby union
- Instituted: 1987; 39 years ago
- Number of teams: 12
- Country: England
- Holders: Novocastrians (2025–26)
- Most titles: Horden (4 titles)
- Website: Website
- Related competition: Counties 1 Yorkshire
- Promotion to: Regional 2 North
- Relegation to: Counties 2 Durham & Northumberland

North East Counties 1, formerly known as Counties 1 Durham & Northumberland and before that Durham/Northumberland 1 is an English amateur rugby union competition. The league consists of twelve clubs, and is in the seventh tier of the English rugby union system; it is one of the sixteen regional leagues in the country and the highest level of local rugby in North East England. The champions are promoted to Regional 2 North, a division with a wider geographical area that also encompasses the Yorkshire region. The last two clubs are relegated to Counties 2 Durham & Northumberland.

Each season, two teams from the league are selected to take part in the RFU Intermediate Cup, a national competition for clubs in the seventh tier: one is affiliated with the Durham County RFU, and the other with the Northumberland RFU.

== Clubs ==
Well-known clubs have competed in Durham/Northumberland 1 throughout the league's history. Many of these clubs enjoyed success, mainly during the amateur era of rugby. These include Gosforth RFC who in the '70s enjoyed success, winning the John Player Cup in 1975–76 and 76–77; West Hartlepool who played in the Premiership in the 1990s; Northern who produced many international players; and Medicals, who have the rare distinction of having been the home club of two RFU Presidents. Clubs such as Alnwick RFC, Stockton RFC and Horden RFC have traditionally played in higher leagues and tend to finish towards the top of Durham/Northumberland 1.

== Format ==
The champions are promoted to Regional 2 North. Teams are relegated to Counties 2 Durham & Northumberland; with the number of teams relegated depending on feedback following promotion and relegation in the leagues above.

The season runs from September to April and comprises twenty-two rounds of matches, with each club playing each of its rivals, home and away. The results of the matches contribute points to the league as follows:

- 4 points are awarded for a win
- 2 points are awarded for a draw
- 0 points are awarded for a loss, however
- 1 losing (bonus) point is awarded to a team that loses a match by 7 points or fewer
- 1 additional (bonus) point is awarded to a team scoring 4 tries or more in a match.

== 2026-27 ==
Ahead of the new season the league was rebranded North East Counties 1 with reserve teams entered into the competition for the first time.

Leaving the league were champions Novocastrians and runners-up Ryton both promoted to Regional 2 North while Acklam were relegated to North East Counties 2 (South).

Team	Ground	Capacity	City/Area	Previous season
Barnard Castle	Birch Road		Barnard Castle, County Durham	Promoted from DN2 (champions)
Bishop Auckland	West Mills Playing Fields		Bishop Auckland, County Durham	10th
Darlington	Blackwell Meadows	3,000	Darlington, County Durham	8th
Durham University	Hollow Drift	3,000 (500 seats)	Durham, County Durham	6th
Gateshead	Eastwood Gardens		Gateshead, Tyne and Wear	7th
Hartlepool	Mayfield Park		Hartlepool, County Durham	11th
Houghton	Dairy Lane		Houghton-le-Spring, Tyne and Wear	Promoted from DN2 (runners-up)
Medicals	Cartington Terrace	1,000	Heaton, Newcastle upon Tyne, Tyne and Wear	4th
Peterlee and Horden	Eden Lane Park		Peterlee, County Durham	5th
Ponteland	Ponteland Leisure Centre		Ponteland, Tyne and Wear	9th
Stockton	The Grangefield Ground		Stockton-on-Tees, County Durham	3rd
Tynedale Raiders	Tynedale Park	2,000 (400 seats)	Corbridge, Northumberland	New entry

Locations of the 2026-27 North East Counties 1 teams

== 2025–26 ==
=== Participating teams and location ===
Leaving the league were Sunderland promoted to Regional 2 North while Whitley Bay Rockcliff were relegated to Counties 2 Durham & Northumberland.

Team	Ground	Capacity	City/Area	Previous season
Acklam	Talbot Park		Acklam, Middlesbrough, North Yorkshire	9th
Bishop Auckland	West Mills Playing Fields		Bishop Auckland, County Durham	10th
Darlington	Blackwell Meadows	3,000	Darlington, County Durham	8th
Durham University	Hollow Drift	3,000 (500 seats)	Durham, County Durham	Promoted from DN2 (champions)
Gateshead	Eastwood Gardens		Gateshead, Tyne and Wear	Promoted from DN2 (2nd)
Hartlepool	Mayfield Park		Hartlepool, County Durham	11th
Medicals	Cartington Terrace	1,000	Heaton, Newcastle upon Tyne, Tyne and Wear	4th
Novocastrians	Sutherland Park	1,150	Benton, Newcastle upon Tyne, Tyne and Wear	2nd
Peterlee and Horden	Eden Lane Park		Peterlee, County Durham	3rd
Ponteland	Ponteland Leisure Centre		Ponteland, Tyne and Wear	6th
Ryton	Main Road		Ryton, Tyne and Wear	7th
Stockton	The Grangefield Ground		Stockton-on-Tees, County Durham	5th

Locations of the 2025–26 Durham/Northumberland 1 teams

== 2024–25 ==
=== Participating teams and location ===
Leaving the league were Guisborough promoted to Regional 2 North while South Shields Westoe and Hartlepool Rovers were relegated to DN2. Replacing them were Stockton (relegated), Darlington and Peterlee and Horden (both promoted). This season was the first when the Horden and Peterlee names were reversed with the latter appearing first to reflect its location.

Team	Ground	Capacity	City/Area	Previous season
Acklam	Talbot Park		Acklam, Middlesbrough, North Yorkshire	6th
Bishop Auckland	West Mills Playing Fields		Bishop Auckland, County Durham	7th
Darlington	Blackwell Meadows	3,000	Darlington, County Durham	Promoted from DN2 (2nd)
Hartlepool	Mayfield Park		Hartlepool, County Durham	7th
Medicals	Cartington Terrace	1,000	Heaton, Newcastle upon Tyne, Tyne and Wear	4th
Novocastrians	Sutherland Park	1,150	Benton, Newcastle upon Tyne, Tyne and Wear	3rd
Peterlee and Horden	Eden Lane Park		Peterlee, County Durham	Promoted from DN2 (champions)
Ponteland	Ponteland Leisure Centre		Ponteland, Tyne and Wear	8th
Ryton	Main Road		Ryton, Tyne and Wear	5th
Stockton	The Grangefield Ground		Stockton-on-Tees, County Durham	Relegated from Regional 2 North (11th)
Sunderland	Ashbrooke Sports Club		Ashbrooke, Sunderland, Tyne and Wear	2nd
Whitley Bay Rockcliff	Lovaine Avenue		Whitley Bay, Tyne and Wear	10th

Locations of the 2024–25 Durham/Northumberland 1 teams

=== League table ===
2024–25 Counties 1 Durham & Northumberland
		Played	Won	Drawn	Lost	Points for	Points against	Points diff	Try bonus	Loss bonus	Points
1	Sunderland (P)	22	22	0	0	918	382	536	19	0	107
2	Novocastrians	22	15	1	6	786	435	351	16	4	82
3	Peterlee & Horden	22	16	1	5	734	536	198	14	1	81
4	Medicals	22	15	0	7	851	500	351	17	4	81
5	Stockton	22	12	1	9	635	615	20	11	3	64
6	Ponteland	22	9	3	10	581	692	−111	12	3	57
7	Ryton	22	9	0	13	597	588	9	11	2	49
8	Darlington	22	9	0	13	500	751	−251	8	4	48
9	Acklam	22	7	1	14	537	653	−116	9	6	45
10	Bishop Auckland	22	7	0	15	536	626	−90	9	4	41
11	Hartlepool	22	5	1	16	483	807	−324	6	1	29
12	Whitley Bay Rockcliff	22	2	0	20	397	970	−573	6	4	18
If teams are level at any stage, tiebreakers are applied in the following order: 1. Number of matches won 2. Difference between points for and against 3. Total number of points for 4. Aggregate number of points scored in matches between tied teams 5. Number of matches won excluding the first match, then the second and so on until the tie is settled
Green background is the promotion place Pink background are the relegation places Updated: 22 November 2025

== 2023–24 ==
=== Participating teams and location ===
Leaving the league were West Hartlepool promoted to Regional 2 North while Darlington and Horden and Peterlee were relegated to DN2. Replacing them were South Shields Westoe (relegated), Bishop Auckland and Ryton (both promoted).

Team	Ground	Capacity	City/Area	Previous season
Acklam	Talbot Park		Acklam, Middlesbrough, North Yorkshire	8th
Bishop Auckland	West Mills Playing Fields		Bishop Auckland, County Durham	Promoted from DN2 (2nd)
Guisborough	Belmangate		Guisborough, North Yorkshire	5th
Hartlepool	Mayfield Park		Hartlepool, County Durham	7th
Hartlepool Rovers	New Friarage		Hartlepool, County Durham	9th
Medicals	Cartington Terrace	1,000	Heaton, Newcastle upon Tyne, Tyne and Wear	3rd
Novocastrians	Sutherland Park	1,150	Benton, Newcastle upon Tyne, Tyne and Wear	10th
Ponteland	Ponteland Leisure Centre		Ponteland, Tyne and Wear	4th
Ryton	Main Road		Ryton, Tyne and Wear	Promoted from DN2 (champions)
South Shields Westoe	Grosvenor Road		South Shields, Tyne and Wear	Relegated from Regional 2 North (11h)
Sunderland	Ashbrooke Sports Club		Ashbrooke, Sunderland, Tyne and Wear	2nd
Whitley Bay Rockcliff	Lovaine Avenue		Whitley Bay, Tyne and Wear	6th

Locations of the 2023–24 Durham/Northumberland 1 teams

=== League table ===
2023–24 Counties 1 Durham & Northumberland
		Played	Won	Drawn	Lost	Points for	Points against	Points diff	Try bonus	Loss bonus	Points	Pts adj
1	Guisborough (P)	22	18	0	4	723	390	333	15	0	87	0
2	Sunderland	22	17	0	5	759	359	400	15	4	87	0
3	Novocastrians	22	18	0	4	767	467	300	16	2	85	−5
4	Medicals	22	14	0	8	586	480	106	11	3	70	0
5	Ryton	22	12	0	10	708	459	249	10	6	64	0
6	Acklam	22	9	0	13	605	785	−180	15	1	53	+1
7	Bishop Auckland	22	9	0	13	551	553	−2	11	4	51	0
8	Ponteland	22	10	0	12	599	545	54	12	3	50	−5
9	Hartlepool	22	10	0	12	450	673	−223	9	1	50	0
10	Whitley Bay Rockcliff	22	7	0	15	527	817	−290	10	3	41	0
11	Hartlepool Rovers (R)	22	8	0	14	494	556	−62	5	3	40	0
12	South Shields Westoe (R)	22	0	0	22	260	945	−685	2	4	6	0
If teams are level at any stage, tiebreakers are applied in the following order: 1. Number of matches won 2. Difference between points for and against 3. Total number of points for 4. Aggregate number of points scored in matches between tied teams 5. Number of matches won excluding the first match, then the second and so on until the tie is settled
Green background is the promotion place Pink background are the relegation places Updated: 20 November 2025

== 2022–23 ==
=== Participating teams and location ===
Leaving the league were Percy Park, Northern, South Shields Westoe, Stockton and Aspatria who were all promoted to Regional 2 North. There was no relegation.

Team	Ground	Capacity	City/Area	Previous season
Acklam	Talbot Park		Acklam, Middlesbrough, North Yorkshire	13th
Darlington	Blackwell Meadows	3,000	Darlington, County Durham	Promoted from DN2 (3rd)
Guisborough	Belmangate		Guisborough, North Yorkshire	Promoted from DN2 (champions)
Hartlepool	Mayfield Park		Hartlepool, County Durham	Promoted from DN2 (2nd)
Hartlepool Rovers	New Friarage		Hartlepool, County Durham	9th
Horden & Peterlee	Eden Lane Park		Peterlee, County Durham	14th
Medicals	Cartington Terrace	1,000	Heaton, Newcastle upon Tyne, Tyne and Wear	7th
Novocastrians	Sutherland Park	1,150	Benton, Newcastle upon Tyne, Tyne and Wear	10th
Ponteland	Ponteland Leisure Centre		Ponteland, Tyne and Wear	11th
Sunderland	Ashbrooke Sports Club		Ashbrooke, Sunderland, Tyne and Wear	8th
West Hartlepool	Brinkburn	2,000 (76 seats)	Hartlepool, County Durham	6th
Whitley Bay Rockcliff	Lovaine Avenue		Whitley Bay, Tyne and Wear	12th

Locations of the 2022–23 Durham/Northumberland 1 teams

=== League table ===
2022–23 Counties 1 Durham & Northumberland
		Played	Won	Drawn	Lost	Points for	Points against	Points diff	Try bonus	Loss bonus	Points
1	West Hartlepool (P)	22	22	0	0	781	302	479	16	0	105
2	Sunderland	22	17	0	5	797	396	401	15	2	85
3	Medicals	22	15	1	6	673	339	334	15	3	80
4	Ponteland	22	12	0	10	532	506	26	12	2	62
5	Guisborough	22	10	0	12	531	473	58	9	6	55
6	Whitley Bay Rockcliff	22	11	0	11	467	454	13	7	2	53
7	Hartlepool	22	10	1	11	445	486	−41	7	3	52
8	Acklam	22	10	0	12	544	596	−52	10	2	52
9	Hartlepool Rovers	22	10	0	12	463	625	−162	8	2	50
10	Novocastrians	22	7	0	15	379	574	−195	6	1	35
11	Darlington (R)	22	4	0	18	362	611	−249	4	4	24
12	Horden & Peterlee (R)	22	3	0	19	278	890	−612	3	1	16
If teams are level at any stage, tiebreakers are applied in the following order: 1. Number of matches won 2. Difference between points for and against 3. Total number of points for 4. Aggregate number of points scored in matches between tied teams 5. Number of matches won excluding the first match, then the second and so on until the tie is settled
Green background is the promotion place Pink background are the relegation places Updated: 17 November 2025

== 2021–22 ==
=== Participating teams and location ===
Middlesbrough finished runners-up in DN1 in 2019–20 but were level transferred to Yorkshire 1 for the current season, the space was taken by Aspatria RUFC who were level transferred from North 2 West.

The teams competing in 2021–22 achieved their places in the league based on performances in 2019–20, the 'previous season' column in the table below refers to that season, not 2020–21.

Team	Ground	Capacity	City/Area	Previous season
Acklam	Talbot Park		Acklam, Middlesbrough, North Yorkshire	9th
Aspatria	Bower Park	3,000 (300 seats)	Aspatria, Cumbria	Level transfer from North 2 West (6th)
Hartlepool Rovers	New Friarage		Hartlepool, County Durham	10th
Horden and Peterlee	Eden Lane Park		Peterlee, County Durham	11th
Medicals	Cartington Terrace	1,000	Heaton, Newcastle upon Tyne, Tyne and Wear	7th
Northern	McCracken Park	1,000	Gosforth, Newcastle upon Tyne, Tyne and Wear	3rd
Novocastrians	Sutherland Park	1,150	Benton, Newcastle upon Tyne, Tyne and Wear	6th
Percy Park	Preston Avenue		North Shields, Tyne and Wear	Relegated from North 1 East (12th)
Ponteland	Ponteland Leisure Centre		Ponteland, Tyne and Wear	Promoted from DN2 (champions)
South Shields Westoe	Wood Terrace		South Shields, Tyne and Wear	4th
Stockton	The Grangefield Ground		Stockton-on-Tees, County Durham	5th
Sunderland	Ashbrooke Sports Club		Ashbrooke, Sunderland, Tyne and Wear	Promoted from DN2 (runners-up)
West Hartlepool	Brinkburn	2,000 (76 seats)	Hartlepool, County Durham	Relegated from North 1 East (13th)
Whitley Bay Rockcliff	Lovaine Avenue		Whitley Bay, Tyne and Wear	8th

Locations of the 2021–22 Durham/Northumberland 1 teams in Tyne & Wear
Locations of the 2021–22 Durham/Northumberland 1 teams in County Durham, North Yorkshire & Cumbria

== 2020–21 ==
On 30 October 2020 the RFU announced that due to the coronavirus pandemic a decision had been taken to cancel Adult Competitive Leagues (National League 1 and below) for the 2020–21 season meaning DN1 was not contested.

== 2019–20 ==
=== Participating teams and location ===
Team	Ground	Capacity	City/Area	Previous season
Acklam	Talbot Park		Acklam, Middlesbrough, North Yorkshire	11th
Barnard Castle	Birch Road		Barnard Castle, County Durham	9th
Consett	Amethyst Park		Consett, County Durham	Relegated from North 1 East (14th)
Gateshead	Eastwood Gardens		Gateshead, Tyne and Wear	8th
Hartlepool Rovers	New Friarage		Hartlepool, County Durham	7th
Horden	Eden Lane Park		Peterlee, County Durham	10th
Medicals	Cartington Terrace	1,000	Heaton, Newcastle upon Tyne, Tyne and Wear	12th
Middlesbrough	Acklam Park	5,000 (159 seats)	Acklam, Middlesbrough, North Yorkshire	Level transfer from Yorkshire 1 (8th)
North Shields	Preston Playing Fields		Preston, North Shields, Tyne and Wear	Promoted from Durham/Northumberland 2 (2nd)
Northern	McCracken Park	1,000	Newcastle upon Tyne, Tyne and Wear	3rd
Novocastrians	Sutherland Park	1,150	Benton, Newcastle upon Tyne, Tyne and Wear	6th
South Shields Westoe	Wood Terrace		South Shields, Tyne and Wear	5th
Stockton	The Grangefield Ground		Stockton-on-Tees, County Durham	4th
Whitley Bay Rockcliff	Lovaine Avenue		Whitley Bay, Tyne and Wear	Promoted from Durham/Northumberland 2 (champions)

Locations of the 2019–20 Durham/Northumberland 1 teams in Tyne & Wear
Locations of the 2019–20 Durham/Northumberland 1 teams in County Durham & Yorkshire

== Original teams ==
When league rugby began in 1987 this division contained the following teams:

- Acklam
- Ashington
- Blyth
- Darlington
- Horden
- Percy Park
- Ponteland
- Redcar
- Rockcliff
- Seghill
- Winlanton Vulcans

== Durham/Northumberland 1 honours ==
=== Durham/Northumberland 1 (1987–1993) ===
The original Durham/Northumberland 1 was a tier 9 league with promotion to North East 2 and relegation to Durham/Northumberland 2.

Durham/Northumberland 1
Season	No of teams	Champions	Runners–up	Relegated teams
1987–88	11	Blyth	Rockcliff	Percy Park
1988–89	11	Rockcliff	Mowden Park	Winlanton Vulcans
1989–90	11	Ashington	Horden	Ponteland, Hartlepool
1990–91	11	Redcar	Horden	Whitby
1991–92	11	Horden	Acklam (Note: Runners up Acklam along with Bishop Auckland were promoted to North East 2.)	No relegation (Note: League restructuring meant no clubs were relegated and five clubs would be promoted from Durham/Northumberland 2)
1992–93	13	Whitby	Darlington	Seghill, Hartlepool
Green backgrounds are promotion places.

=== Durham/Northumberland 1 (1993–2000) ===
The creation of National 5 North for the 1993–94 season meant that Durham/Northumberland 1 dropped to tier 10. A further restructure at the end of the 1995–96 season, which included the cancellation of National 5 North and the addition of North East 3 at tier 9, saw Durham/Northumberland 1 remain at tier 10 with promotion to the new North 3 East league.

Durham/Northumberland 1
Season	No of teams	Champions	Runners–up	Relegated teams
1993–94	13	Mowden Park	Darlington	Consett, Seaham
1994–95	13	Percy Park	Sunderland	Wallsend, Guisborough
1995–96	12	Darlington	Sunderland	North Durham, Ponteland
1996–97	10	West Hartlepool TDSOB	Ryton	Hartlepool, Guisborough, Novocastrians
1997–98	10	Ryton	Acklam	North Durham (Note: North Durham merged with Gateshead Fell at the end of this season and therefore ceased to exist as a club. As such they did not take up their position in Durham/Northumberland 2 the following season.), Bishop Auckland
1998–99	10	Medicals	Acklam	Blyth, North Shields
1999–00	10	Consett	Winlaton Vulcans	Seghill, Novocastrians, Whitley Bay Rockcliff
Green backgrounds are promotion places.

=== Durham/Northumberland 1 (2000–2022) ===
Northern league restructuring by the RFU at the end of the 1999–2000 season saw the cancellation of North East 1, North East 2 and North East 3 (tiers 7–9). This meant that Durham/Northumberland 1 became a tier 7 league, with promotion to North 2 East (also known as North 1 East).

Durham/Northumberland 1
Season	No of teams	Champions	Runners–up	Relegated teams	Ref
2000–01	12	Westoe	Durham City	Medicals	
2001–02	12	Horden	Ashington	Winlaton Vulcans, Consett	
2002–03	12	Northern	Hartlepool Rovers	Ryton, Gosforth	
2003–04	12	Hartlepool Rovers	Alnwick	Houghton, Gateshead	
2004–05	12	Percy Park	Durham City	Ashington, Hartlepool	
2005–06	12	Horden	Malton and Norton	Acklam, West Hartlepool T.D.S.O.B.	
2006–07	12	Gateshead	Sunderland	North Shields, Consett, Gosforth	
2007–08	12	Billingham	Northern	West Hartlepool T.D.S.O.B., Ponteland	
2008–09	12	Hartlepool Rovers	Percy Park	No relegation (Note: No relegation as division set to expand from 12 to 14 teams for the following season.)	
2009–10	14	Northern	Team Northumbria	Consett, Hartlepool	
2010–11	14	Gateshead	Darlington	Redcar, Wallsend	
2011–12	14	Darlington	Alnwick	Novocastrians, Ashington	
2012–13	14	Alnwick	Guisborough	Sunderland, Ryton	
2013–14	14	Horden	Guisborough	Bishop Auckland, Ponteland	
2014–15	14	Guisborough	Morpeth	Sunderland, Blyth	
2015–16	14	Durham City	Middlesbrough	Darlington, Ponteland	
2016–17	14	Northern	South Shields Westoe	Ryton, Hartlepool	
2017–18	14	Consett	Durham City	Redcar, Gosforth	
2018–19	14	Durham City	West Hartlepool	Whitby, Ponteland	
2019–20	14	Consett	Middlesbrough	Barnard Castle, North Shields, Gateshead	
2020–21	14	Cancelled due to COVID-19 pandemic in the United Kingdom.			
2021–22	14	Percy Park	Northern	No relegation	
Green backgrounds are promotion places.

=== Counties 1 Durham & Northumberland (2022–present) ===
Counties 1 Durham & Northumberland
Season	No of teams	Champions	Runners–up	Relegated teams	Ref
2022–23	12	West Hartlepool	Sunderland	Darlington (11th) and Horden (12th)	
2023–24	12	Guisborough	Sunderland	Hartlepool Rovers (11th) and South Shields Westoe (12th)	
2024–25	12	Sunderland	Novocastrians	Rockcliff (12th)	

== Promotion play-offs ==
Since the 2000–01 season there has been a play-off between the runners-up of Durham/Northumberland 1 and Yorkshire 1 for the third and final promotion place to North 1 East. The team with the superior league record has home advantage in the tie. At the end of the 2019–20 season Yorkshire 1 teams have been the most successful with thirteen wins to the Durham/Northumberland 1 teams six; and the home side have won ten times to the away sides nine.

Durham/Northumberland 1 v Yorkshire 1 promotion play-off results
Season	Home team	Score	Away team	Venue	Attendance
2000–01	Wheatley Hills (Y)	21-19	Percy Park (DN) (Note: Despite finishing third in the 2000-01 Durham/Northumberland league, Percy Park went into the promotion playoff instead of runners up Durham City.)	Brunel Road, Doncaster, South Yorkshire	
2001–02	Ashington (DN)	17-23	Scarborough (Y)	Recreation Ground, Ashington, Northumberland	
2002–03	York (Y)	29-15	Hartlepool Rovers (DN)	Clifton Park, York, North Yorkshire	
2003–04	Alnwick (DN)	25-18	Pontefract (Y)	Greensfield, Alnwick, Northumberland	
2004–05	Durham City (DN)	26-13	Wheatley Hills (Y)	Hollow Drift, Durham, County Durham	
2005–06	Malton and Norton (DN)	19-39	Old Crossleyans (Y)	The Gannock, Malton, North Yorkshire	
2006–07	Sunderland (DN)	16-18	York (Y)	Ashbrooke Sports Club, Ashbrooke, Sunderland, Tyne and Wear	
2007–08	Northern (DN)	24-28	Ilkley (Y)	McCracken Park, Gosforth, Newcastle upon Tyne, Tyne and Wear	
2008–09	Percy Park (DN)	36-3	Bridlington (Y)	Preston Avenue, North Shields, Tyne and Wear	
2009–10	Team Northumbria (DN)	34-13	Sheffield (Y)	Coach Lane Sports Ground, Benton, Newcastle upon Tyne, Tyne and Wear	
2010–11	Darlington (DN)	17-18	Sheffield (Y)	Blackwell Meadows, Darlington, County Durham	
2011–12	Alnwick (DN)	16-18	Keighley (Y)	Greensfield, Alnwick, Northumberland	
2012–13	Huddersfield Y.M.C.A. (Y)	33-12	Guisborough (DN)	Laund Hill, Huddersfield, West Yorkshire	
2013–14	Dinnington (Y)	34-20 (aet)	Guisborough (DN)	Lodge Lane, Dinnington, South Yorkshire	
2014–15	Morpeth (DN)	14-11	Malton and Norton (Y)	Grange House Field, Morpeth, Northumberland	
2015–16	Middlesbrough (DN)	17-25	Malton and Norton (Y)	Acklam Park, Middlesbrough, North Yorkshire	
2016–17	South Shields Westoe (DN)	14-19	West Leeds (Y)	Wood Terrace, South Shields, Tyne and Wear	
2017–18	Durham City (DN)	AWO (Note: Scarborough won by default as Durham City were unable to raise a team.)	Scarborough (Y)	Hollow Drift, Durham, County Durham	
2018–19	West Hartlepool (DN)	24-23	Heath (Y)	Brinkburn, Hartlepool, County Durham	
2019–20	Cancelled due to COVID-19 pandemic in the United Kingdom. Best ranked runner up - Heath (Y) - promoted instead.				
2020–21	N/A	N/A	N/A	Uncontested due to the coronavirus pandemic	
2021–22	N/A	N/A	N/A	Uncontested due the RFU Adult Competition Review	
Green background is the promoted team. DN = Durham/Northumberland 1 and Y = Yorkshire 1

== Number of league titles ==
- Horden (4)
- Consett (3)
- Northern (3)
- Percy Park (3)
- Darlington (2)
- Durham City (2)
- Gateshead (2)
- Guisborough (2)
- Hartlepool Rovers (2)
- Alnwick (1)
- Ashington (1)
- Billingham (1)
- Blyth (1)
- Medicals (1)
- Mowden Park (1)
- Novocastrians (1)
- Redcar (1)
- Ryton (1)
- Sunderland (1)
- Whitby (1)
- Rockcliff (1)
- West Hartlepool (1)
- West Hartlepool TDSOB (1)
- Westoe (1) (Note: Currently known as South Shields Westoe.)

== See also ==
- Durham RFU
- Northumberland RFU
- English rugby union system
- Rugby union in England
