= Derek Morgan =

Derek Morgan may refer to:

- Derek Morgan, fictional character from the comic book Ultimate Comics: X
- Derek Morgan (cricketer) (1929−2017), English cricketer
- Derek Morgan (Criminal Minds), fictional character
- Derek Morgan (rugby union) (born 1935), English rugby player

== See also ==
- Derrick Morgan (born 1940), musical artist
- Derrick Morgan (American football) (born 1989), American football defensive end
