= Tyne Tees =

Tyne Tees may be known as:

- ITV Tyne Tees, formerly Tyne Tees Television
- Tyne Tees Tigers, Australian rules football club in England
- Tyne–Tees derby, a football term
- Tyne-Tees Regiment, formed in 1999
- Tyne Tees Steam Shipping Company, opened in the 1900s
- 50th (Northumbrian) Infantry Division, also known as the Tyne-Tees division
