= Redcar RUFC =

Rugby union club in North Yorkshire, England

Redcar Rugby Club
- Full name: Redcar Rugby Union Football Club
- Union: Yorkshire RFU
- Nickname(s): The Seasiders, Car
- Founded: 1921; 104 years ago
- Location: Redcar, North Yorkshire, England
- Ground(s): Mackinlay Park
- Chairman: (England) George White
- Captain(s): (England) James Toward (1st XV) (England) Nathan Cooke (2nd XV)
- League(s): Durham/Northumberland 2
- 2020–21: Champions (promoted to Durham/Northumberland 2)

Official website
- www.redcarrufc.co.uk

Redcar Rugby Union Football Club known as Redcar Rugby Club or RRUFC, is an English rugby union club for the local town of Redcar, located in North Yorkshire. It currently plays in Counties 2 Durham & Northumberland following the club's promotion as champions, from Durham/Northumberland 3 at the end of the 2019-20 season. RRUFC currently run two senior teams, the 1XV and the Mariners. The Mariners ply their trade in the Tees Valley Social League.

== History ==
The club was first mentioned in a letter to the Evening Gazette dated 23 November 1920 when Mr. H.L.De Roper, who was staying at the Coatham Hotel, wrote to the editor suggesting that it was time that the town of Redcar had its own rugby club. "I am only a temporary resident at Redcar, so cannot take the initiative myself, but I am sure a XV could be raised in the town if someone would take the matter in hand. Perhaps, sir, you would help by publishing this letter, and a meeting of anyone interested could be arranged, but as I am leaving the town this week for some time I cannot take the lead myself."

On 3 December later that year whilst playing against South Bank at the racecourse it was noted that after scoring their opening try Redcar had 16 players on the field and one was asked to leave. Redcar won the game 18-9.

The name of Mackinlay has been known in rugby circles for many years. Dr. J.E.H. Mackinlay took over The Green House from Colonel Locke in about 1876 and although he did not play rugby in the north, he played three quarter for St George's hospital and the united London hospitals. He went on to play for England as a forward in 1872, 73 and 75 and appears on a photo of the England team dated 3 March 1873.

Dr W.H.Mackinlay (after whom Mackinlay park was named) who, because he attended Coatham grammar school never actually played rugby was extremely keen and in 1920 took the first opportunity of helping promote the Redcar RC, as we now know it. He became the first president, and J.Lambert "Pinkie" Spence the first chairman.

Like many of the original rugby administrators in this area Pinkie was a Tynesider, and as the Callums were both at school at Sedbergh their plain chocolate was adopted as the original club colours.

Dr Mackinlay continued as a most regular supporter throughout the 1920s and 1930s and gained great pleasure from two sources. Coatham School changing to rugby and the extremely good side of the late 1930s. He died just after the start of the Second World War and the club closed down for the war years.

The dynasty continued however with Dr Ian Mackinlay who played his first game for the club at Easter 1923 on his return from Durham school. He along with Norman Knudsen (as captain and secretary), Charlie Powell (as rest of the committee) started things up again after the war. Their fund raising activities were based almost exclusively upon the clients of the Royal Standard Hotel. The following year Ken Forster and most of the old crowd returned and the club re constituted. Ian Mackinlay was president and Ken Forster as chairman, a post he was to hold for over 20 years before leaving the area on business.

The next member of the family to become involved was Nick Mackinlay who was captain of the 1st XV in 1973/74/75. Nick, probably the best scrum half the club has ever seen and a Yorkshire trialist, was a regular member of the side for many years during the late 1960s and 1970s before moving on to play an important part in the rapid promotion of Stirling County, finishing his playing career at Ilkley.

The club on its restart in 1947 had little funds and few players. John Pargeter recalls attending a meeting in the Royal Standard Hotel with the president Dr Ian in the chair; Ken Forster; Norman Knudsen who had been the 1939 skipper; Charlie Powell (who had his hands on the little brass that existed at the time) and a handful of stragglers who had returned from the services.

The ground at the racecourse was still there with its ups and downs, and the little stand, which never had a roof, was also still there. So was the stable where the players changed.

Prior to the war it had been the practice that the players were allowed to change in the jockeys weighing room. The club was evicted from that accommodation because the scales used to weigh the 7 stone jockeys were unsurprisingly damaged by the 16 stone rugby forwards checking on the weight of this week's pack. The new accommodation consisted of two loose boxes the floors being covered in straw. A bath of sorts was constructed and filled from the copper boiler. Once everyone was changed, the ladies would provide tea amongst the now somewhat soggy straw, on trestle tables.

The committee were approached by Bill Stainsby, who owned a small engineering business at South Bank. He offered to sell two former R.A.F. wooden huts and erect them on the racecourse. Permission was granted and the new home arrived. Doug Smailes, a talented young bricklayer, was given the job of building a fireplace which when completed became the focal point of the clubhouse. In gratitude to the racecourse, it was agreed that as the new clubhouse would only be used during the winter and beds would be brought in during the summer for the stable boys and jockeys. With due democracy the players wives were volunteered to run the hostel with all profits going into the rugby club's funds.

The new ground was to be at Green Lane on farmland owned by Lord Zetland, the contacts that we had made through Dr. Ian Mackinlay and others gave us this opportunity to grow. Willie Wardman farmed the land, Willie remained a member and good friend to many at the club until his death. In 1959 the land was bought and prepared, in 1961 the first games were played at green lane however for the next two years the old club continued to be used for both changing and the entertainment of our guests. Finally in 1963 we moved into the new clubhouse celebrated with a game against a Durham Presidents XV and the ground was formally named Mackinlay Park.

The club itself consisted of the main bar area, the small lounge and two changing rooms and a single bath. The playing field area was the portion of the field to the north of the old ditch line where two pitches could be accommodated. This was luxury. Much of the money needed to fund this move was obtained from our brewers Samuel Smiths. They were always very fair in their dealings with us but their product wasn't universally popular and we then moved onto Scottish and Newcastle.

Some ten years later a small nucleus of players decided that it was time that squash courts were built. After much heart searching it was decided to build two courts and to extend the changing rooms. The project was completed and to celebrate the official opening of this facility Jonah Barrington was invited to open the courts. He was unable to attend and so on Sunday 22 September 1974 at 2.15pm the courts were opened by Mr. John Pargeter. Following the ceremony a rugby match between the Redcar 1st XV and a North Yorkshire side took place. The team of Bernard, Whitehill, Homan, Vickers, Dewar, Wood, Mackinlay, Coulson, Wright, Coyne, Shaw, Pacey, Kerruish, Hartley and Barnacal were defeated by 19pts to 4.

Further developments have taken place over the years with the adding of first the television lounge, then the pool room and kitchen.

With grant aid obtained from the foundation for sports and the arts of some £100k it was left to the management committee to raise the remaining capital needed to fund the project. It is history now but after much debate and some heated discussions the decision was taken to go ahead. Due to a great deal of hard work the club was able to open throughout the project and many of us will remember drinking under candle light surrounded on all sides by rubble. All for the good of the club of course.

The only full international and England player who was a member of this club was Ged Dunn. Ged joined Redcar from school and formed a formidable centre partnership with Ron Fletcher. He was a naturally gifted player with an exhilarating burst of speed and when necessary a tenacious tackler. In 1970 he was playing for Redcar at the Bridlington 7's tournament when Hull Kingston rovers spotted him. They followed up their interest and Ged signed a rugby league contract in August 1971 for a four-figure sum. As he says it was a lot of money for a young student teacher worrying how to scrape enough money together for a holiday in St Tropez. He went on to play first for Yorkshire and then England touring to Australia, New Zealand and New Guinea. Ged played 284 games for Hull K.R. and scored 160 tries.

== Honours ==
1st XV

- Durham/Northumberland 1 champions: 1990–91
- Durham/Northumberland 2 champions: 2016–17
- Durham/Northumberland 3 champions: 2019–20

Redcar Mariners

- Tees Valley Merit League champions: 1999–00
- Tees Valley Social League champions: 2015–16
