= Medicals RFC =

English rugby union club, based in Newcastle-upon-Tyne

(England) Medicals RFC
- Full name: Medicals Rugby Football Club
- Union: Northumberland RFU
- Founded: 1898; 128 years ago
- Location: Newcastle upon Tyne, Tyne and Wear, England
- Ground(s): Cartington Terrace, Heaton, Newcastle (Capacity: 1,000)
- Captain: (England) Andy Bath
- League: Counties 1 Durham & Northumberland
- 2024–25: 4th

Official website
- www.pitchero.com/clubs/medicals/

Medicals RFC is a rugby union club in Newcastle Upon Tyne who have been in existence since 1898. They currently play in the Counties 1 Durham & Northumberland, having been promoted from Durham/Northumberland 2 in the 2009–10 season. Medicals highest profile success came in 1995–96 when the club reached the final of the Pilkington Shield at Twickenham and won the trophy – beating Cornish side Helston 16 – 6.

The uniform of the club is maroon jerseys with white collars, white shorts and maroon stockings with white tops. The club crest is a serpent entwined around a rod, a symbol representing the Greek god of medicine, Asclepius.

== History ==
In 1852 Durham University expanded from Durham into Newcastle when the medical school in Newcastle (established in 1834) became a college of Durham University. The club was subsequently formed in 1898 as the Durham University College of Medicine R.F.C. and has historically attracted a significant number of players from the medical, and dental, schools of Newcastle University.

Medicals was then elected a senior member of the Northumberland RFU in 1920 first as a junior club between 1934 and 1937, before being elected a senior member of the Northumberland RFU.

The club play home matches at its Cartington Terrace ground in Heaton, Newcastle which dates back to the club's formation in 1898. The pavilion was built in 1936 and the timber grandstand in 1933 before being restored in 1988. The ground hosts cricket during the Summer months.

== Honours ==
- Pilkington Shield winners: 1996
- Northumberland Senior Cup winners (4): 1922, 1923, 1952, 1953
- Northumberland Senior Plate winners (2): 2012, 2022
- Durham/Northumberland 1 champions: 1998–99
- Durham/Northumberland 3 champions: 2006–07

== Pilkington Shield (1996) ==
The club's finest hour came on 4 May 1996 at Twickenham Stadium when the club won the National Junior Club Knock-out Competition, then called the Pilkington Shield, defeating Helston by 16–6 with a try from winger Richard Fretwell converted by fly-half Matthew Bonner who added three drop goals.

== Notable players ==
The club has been home to five Internationals:

- (England) Dr EE. Chapman, 1910–14 (the first man to score a try and kick a goal at Twickenham)
- (England) Dr R. Armstrong, 1924
- (England) Dr Stephen Peel, a wartime cap
- (England) W.G.D. Morgan, 1960–61
- (England) D.W.N. Caplan 1978

International trialists include Dr G.C.Taylor, Mr G. Scott-Page and Dr Maurice Jones.

- (Norway) former professional Erik Lund made a handful of appearances for the club during his time studying at Newcastle University

== RFU Presidents ==
Medicals also has the honour and distinction of having two members elected to the position of President of the RFU.

- (England) Mr D.D.Serfontein, 1992–1993
- (England) W.G.D. Morgan 2002–2003
