= Broadway West Sports Ground =

Sports venue in Newcastle upon Tyne, England

Broadway West
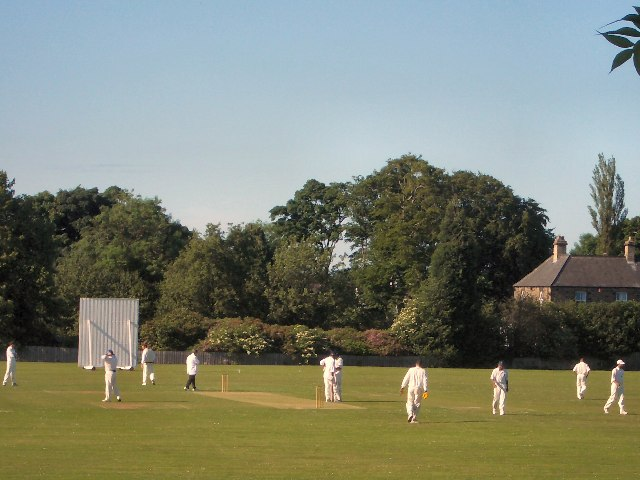
- Interactive map of Broadway West
- Location: Gosforth, Newcastle upon Tyne, England
- Coordinates: 55.017°N 1.632°W
- Owner: Newcastle City Council
- Operator: Gosforth Sports Association

Tenants
- Gosforth Rugby Football Club; Newcastle City Cricket Club; Tyne Tees Tigers; Newcastle Nighthawks Baseball Club.

Broadway West Sports Ground is a multi-use sports complex in Gosforth, Newcastle upon Tyne, England. It is located in the Parklands ward.

It is home to sports teams that are under the Gosforth Sports Association banner; Gosforth Rugby Football Club, Newcastle City Cricket Club, Tyne Tees Tigers and Newcastle Nighthawks Baseball Club. The site is located near the Wansbeck Road Metro station.

Gosforth Rugby Football Club moved to the site after previously being tenants at Bullocksteads Sports Ground and Druid Park.

The sports ground and adjacent Kingston Park Road playing fields are also used for community groups and events. It also hosts the Newcastle Roundtable Fireworks Display annually around Guy Fawkes Night. Red House Farm J.F.C. play at the adjacent Kingston Park Road playing fields after moving from Broadway West in 2003 to build their own club house.

Gosforth Sports Association took a 30-year lease on the site and clubhouse in September 2015 from Newcastle City Council.
