= Mark Griffin (rugby union) =

US international rugby union player

Mark Timothy Griffin MBE (born April 6, 1975, Oakham, Rutland) is a former rugby union player who represented the United States as a Hooker. He is currently Commercial Director at USA Rugby.

Griffin played for Durham University RFC as a student and later Old Blue R.F.C. in New York. He made his USA debut against Spain at Fort Lauderdale in 2003. He won his ninth and final cap against Romania at Chichibunomiya in Tokyo during the 2005 Toshiba Super Cup. He was made a Member of the Order of the British Empire in the 2015 New Year Honours for "services to charitable causes and youth development in the USA".
