= Gosforth RFC =

English rugby union club, based in Newcastle upon Tyne

(England) Gosforth
- Full name: Gosforth Rugby Football Club
- Union: Northumberland RFU
- Founded: 1877; 149 years ago
- Location: Newcastle upon Tyne, Tyne and Wear, England
- Ground: Broadway West
- League: Durham/Northumberland 2
- 2019–20: 12th (relegated to Durham/Northumberland 3)

Official website
- gosforthrfc.rfu.club

Gosforth Rugby Football Club is a rugby union team, currently playing in Durham/Northumberland 3 following the club's relegation from Durham/Northumberland 2 at the end of the 2019-20 season. The club was originally established in 1877, however in 1996 the club split in two. One half, Newcastle Gosforth (now Newcastle Red Bulls) went on to become the first ever professional rugby union club. Newcastle Red Bulls have been one of the most successful clubs in Northern England with 1 Premiership and 4 domestic cups to their name. The amateur Gosforth club was founded in the split.

Their local rivals are Northern Football Club.

== History ==
The original Gosforth Football Club was founded in 1877 by a group of Old Boys of Durham School, in whose colours of green and white hoops the club played until the mid-1990s. In 1955, the club moved to a new ground at North Road, Gosforth, which was to be its home until 1990. During that time and particularly in the late 1970s Gosforth enjoyed tremendous success both on and off the field, winning the John Player Cup in seasons 1975/76 and 76/77.

In 1990 the club name was changed to Newcastle Gosforth and they moved to Kingston Park. Gosforth Rugby Club continued as an amateur side working in partnership with Northumbria University.

In 1996 Gosforth joined the new league structure (at the bottom) in Durham/Northumberland 4 (then level 13), won the league at the first attempt, and achieved a ‘double’ by also winning the Northumberland Senior Shield. Further league championships were won in 1997/98 (Durham/Northumberland 3), 1999/2000 (Durham/Northumberland 2 ) and 2000/01 (Durham/Northumberland 2), the latter at level 8 after reorganisation of the leagues in 2000. The club struggled in Durham/Northumberland 1 and was relegated in 2003 but regained its place with promotion in 2005/06.

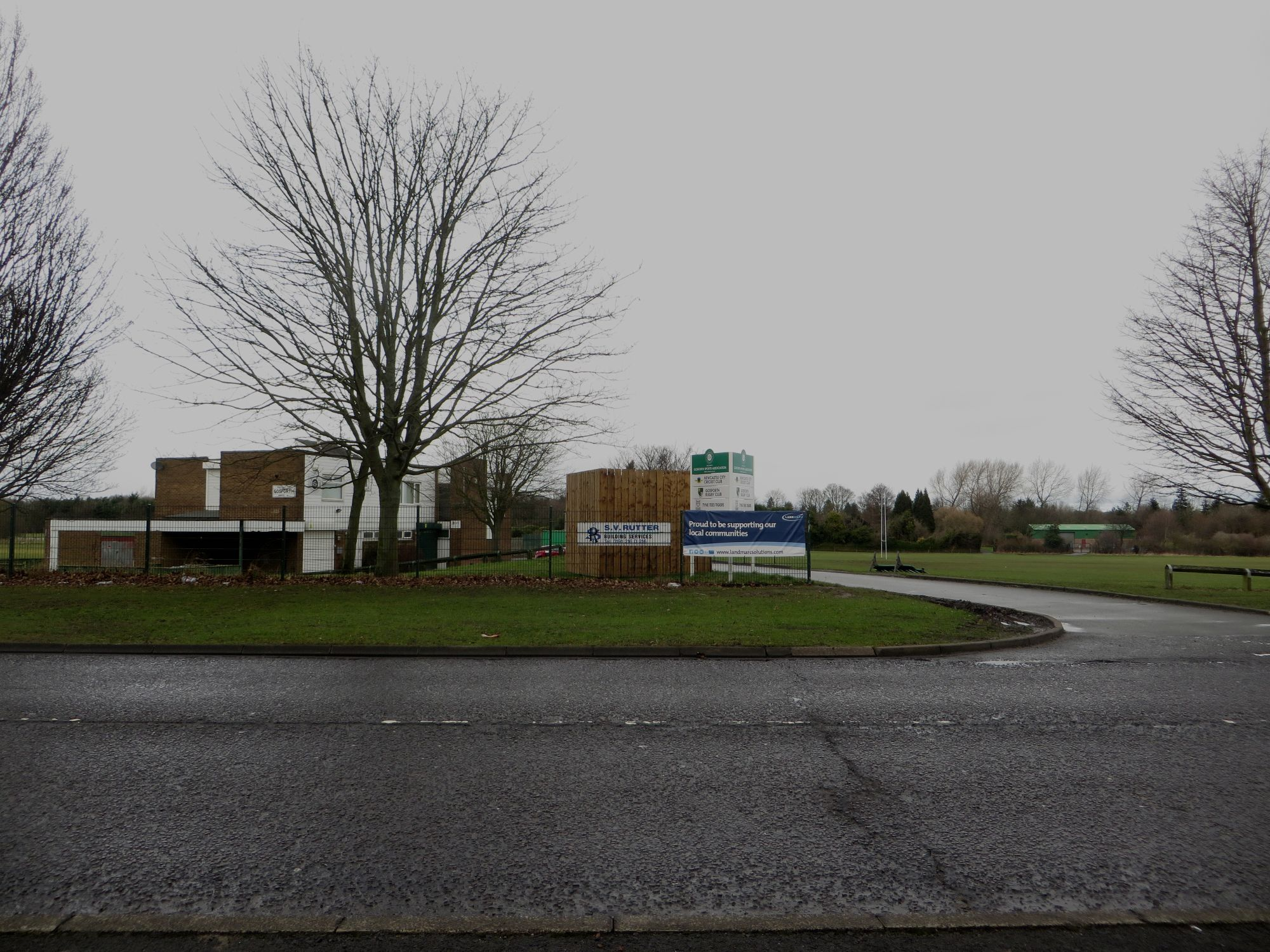
Broadway West

As the new amateur club they played at Bullocksteads Sports Ground from 1996–2007 and played at Druid Park until 2014. Gosforth returned to Bullocksteads Sports Ground for one season, while plans were put in place to move back to Gosforth, for the first time since the sale of the North Road Ground in 1990. The BiG (Back in Gosforth) campaign was finally achieved in July 2015, when the flag was raised at the new clubhouse on Broadway West.

== Notable players ==
Gosforth supplied players to all counties over the years, to the North of England sides and to the full international and British Lions teams.

- Arthur Smith, 33 caps for Scotland and never dropped.
- Ray McLoughlin
- Malcolm Young
- Roger Uttley
- Peter Dixon
- Jim Pollock (born 1958) Scottish International, Barbarian FC and Novocastrians Captain
- Neil McDowell (England rugby)
- Colin White
- Steve Bainbridge
- Duncan Madsen (14 caps for Scotland and Barbarians)
- Mick Lazarus

== Club Honours ==
- Durham/Northumberland 4 Champions 1996–97
- Durham/Northumberland 3 Champions 1997–98
- Durham/Northumberland 2 champions (2): 1999–00, 2000–01
- Northumberland Senior Plate: 2005
