= Druid Park =

Multi-purpose stadium in Woolsington, England

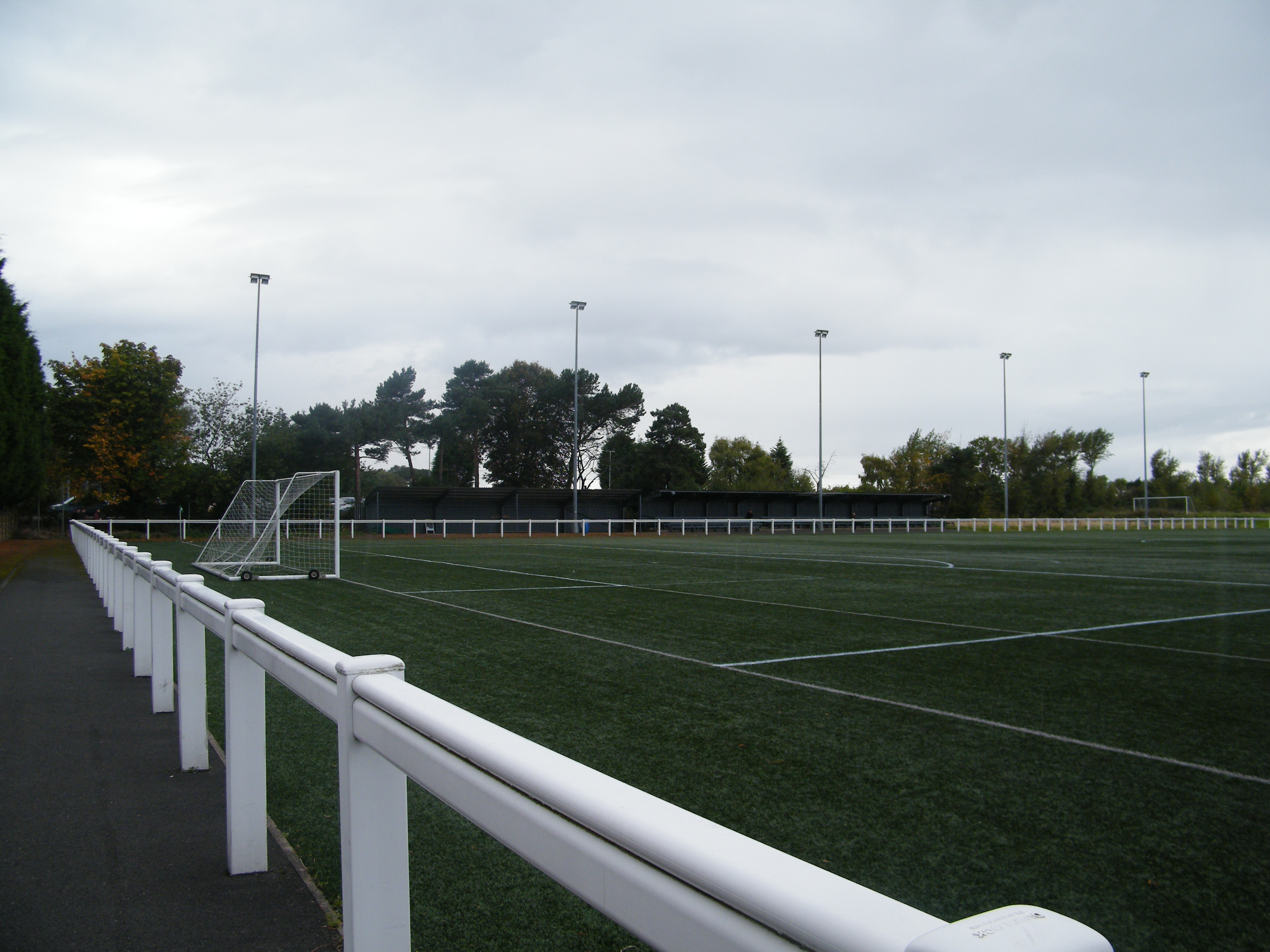
- Interactive map of Druid Park
- Former names: Wheatsheaf Ground
- Location: Woolsington, Newcastle upon Tyne, England, UK
- Coordinates: 55.029°N 1.703°W
- Capacity: 2,500
- Surface: Artificial turf

Tenants
- Gosforth RFC; Newcastle Vikings; Newcastle Blue Star; West Allotment Celtic; Great Park FC; Great Park FC Juniors

Druid Park (originally known as the Wheatsheaf Ground) is a multi-purpose stadium in Woolsington, north Newcastle upon Tyne in England. It is currently used for football and rugby union matches and was the home stadium of Gosforth RFC from 2007–2014. Druid Park is the home of Great Park FC and Great Park FC Juniors. The grounds facilities include changing rooms for Home and away teams as well as for match officials, a small gym, conference room, multi purpose room and a bar which is open before, during and after matches.

== The ground ==
Druid Park used to be the ground of the Newcastle Blue Star football club. It currently uses artificial turf.

For the 2007/08 season, Gosforth RFC moved to a new ground, Druid Park, from their former location Bullocksteads Sports Ground. Dave Thompson, the major shareholder of Newcastle Falcons, invited Gosforth to be the main player at Druid Park. Thompson took a 25-year lease on the ground.

Druid park is close to Newcastle Airport.

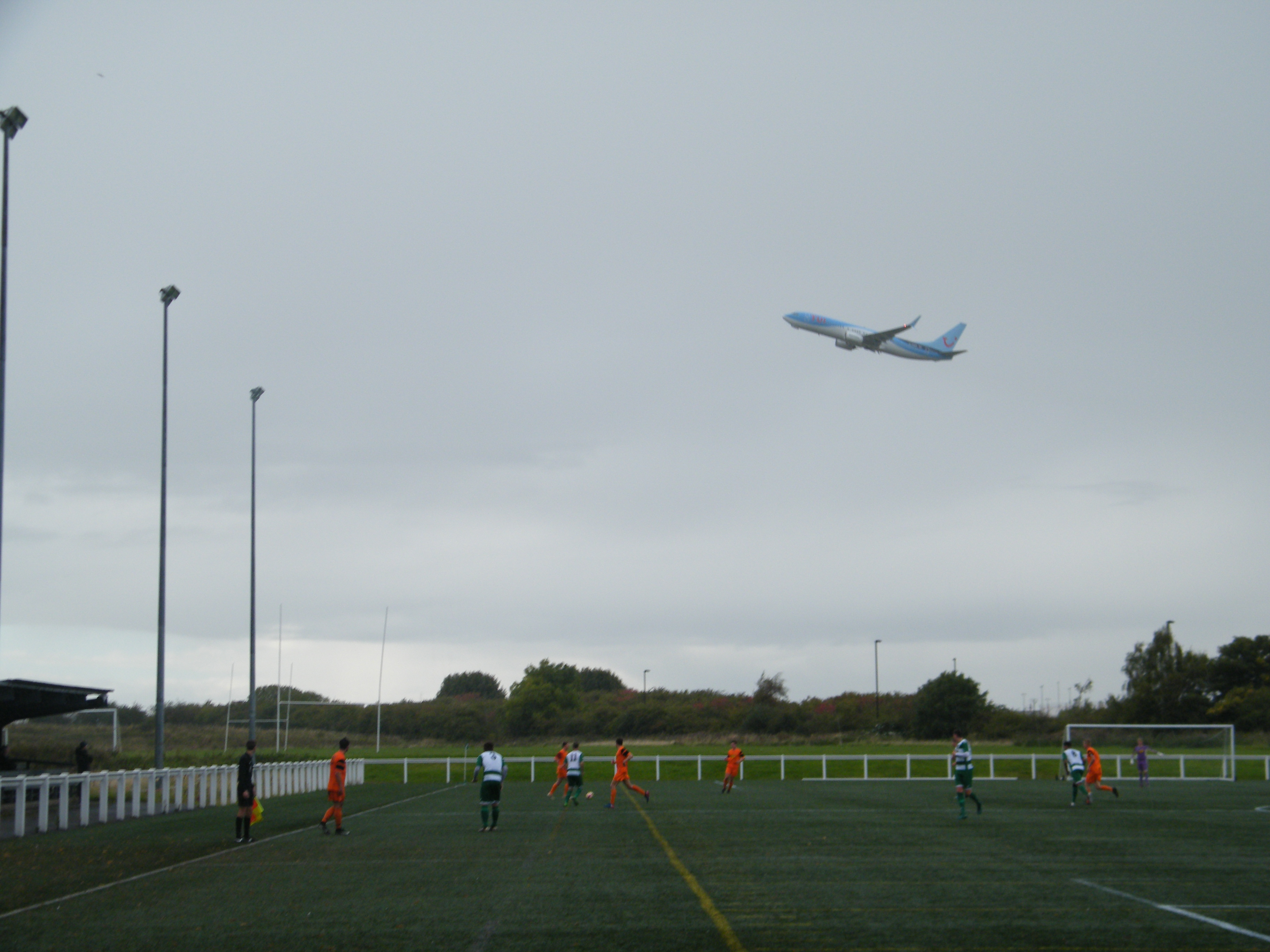
Photo of Plane take off over football ground

.
