= Durham University RFC =

Rugby union club in county Durham, England

(England) Durham University RFC
- Full name: Durham University Rugby Football Club
- Nickname: Palatinates
- Founded: 1875; 151 years ago
- Location: Durham, England
- Ground: Hollow Drift (Capacity: 3,000 (500 seats))
- President: Steve Colwell
- Coach: Simon Culley
- League: Counties 2 Durham & Northumberland
- 2024−25: 1st (promoted to Counties 1 Durham & Northumberland)
Team kit

Official website
- www.durhamunirugby.com

The Durham University Rugby Football Club (Durham University RFC or DURFC) is the rugby union club of the University of Durham. They play in BUCS Super Rugby, the highest level student rugby competition in the UK, and have produced a number of notable international rugby players.

== History ==
One of the earliest recorded matches was against Durham School, on 2 November 1875. The school won by "one goal, one try and two touch-downs to three touch-downs". Other fixtures for Michaelmas term 1875 included vs Houghton-le-Spring in Houghton on 6 November, vs Durham City in Durham on 13 November, vs South Shields in South Shields on 20 November, the return match vs Durham School in Durham on 25 November, vs Sunderland in Durham on 27 November, the return match vs Durham City on 2 December, vs Northumberland in Newcastle on 4 December, and the return match vs Houghton-le-Spring in Durham on 11 December.

Ted Wood previously served as director of rugby.

Durham won the UAU Championship (precursor to BUCS), in 1951, 1955, 1965, 1969, 1981, 1982, 1983, 1987, 2004, 2011, 2012, 2013.

Durham were crowned BUCS Super Rugby champions for the 2019–20 season under captain Ben Fowles, the Covid-19 pandemic stopped the team from going to challenge for the BUCS Super Rugby Cup Final.

Following the cancelled Covid-19 season, Durham again won the BUCS Super Rugby league title for the 2021–22 season under captain Fred Davies.

The 150th anniversary in 2025 saw celebratory matches on 3 May with a DUWRFC Past and Present team taking on a North East Women's Select team and the men's 1st team becoming only the fifth university side (the fourth from a UK university) to play against the Barbarians. The Barbarians won the fixture 54–33.

== Notable former players ==
Flags represent country capped by in international competition.

- (England) Will Carling
- (England) Will Greenwood
- (England) Phil de Glanville
- (England) Dave Walder
- (England) Charlie Hodgson
- (England) Tim Stimpson
- (Scotland) Duncan Hodge
- (Scotland) Jeremy Campbell-Lamerton
- (England) Andy Mullins
- (England) Marcus Rose
- (England) Ben Woods
- (England) Pete Dixon
- (England) Toby Allchurch
- (Scotland) Richard Breakey
- (England) Tim Cowell
- (Bermuda) Peter Westwood
- (United States) Mark Griffin
- (England) Charlie Hannaford
- Jon Ions
- Chris Kelly
- (Scotland) Peter Lillington
- (Scotland) Ed Kalman
- (England) Ollie Phillips
- (England) Peter Warfield
- (England) Josh Beaumont
- (England) Simon Hammersley

== Honours ==
- Counties 3 Durham & Northumberland Champions: 2023–24
- Counties 2 Durham & Northumberland Champions: 2024–25
- Earlston Sevens Champions (1): 2023
