= Peterlee & Horden RFC =

Rugby union club in county Durham, England

Peterlee & Horden Rugby Club
- Full name: Peterlee and Horden Rugby Football Club
- Union: Durham County RFU
- Founded: 1925; 101 years ago
- Location: Peterlee, County Durham, England
- Ground: Eden Park
- Coach(es): Paul Armstrong, Jon Hudson, Neil Harrop
- Captain(s): Christopher Wood and David Heckles
- League: Counties 1 Durham & Northumberland
- 2024–25: 3rd
Team kit

Official website
- www.pitchero.com/clubs/hordenrugbyclub

Peterlee & Horden Rugby Football Club is an English rugby union club who play in the Counties 1 Durham & Northumberland.

== History ==
Peterlee & Horden Rugby Football Club was formed in 1925 as Horden RFC.

== Structure ==
Peterlee & Horden have four senior teams within the club.

- 1st team
- 2nd team
- 3rd team
- Ladies team (Valkyries)

== Mini & Junior ==
Peterlee & Horden have a very successful mini & junior set up with teams from U8 to U18. February 2012, saw Horden (as was) have their U13s, U16s and U18s all in the respective County Cup semi-finals for the 2011–12 season. Peterlee & Horden now have successful U12s, U14s and U16s girls teams.

A number of players from the club have gone on to represent Durham County and the club currently has a number of players at the regional school of rugby.

== Rivals ==
In recent years, Peterlee & Horden's main rivals have been Hartlepool Rovers. West Hartlepool are the other main local derby.

== Honours ==
- Counties 2 Durham and Northumberland champions (1): 2023–24
- Durham/Northumberland 1 champions (4): 1991–92, 2001–02, 2005–06, 2013–14
- North East 2 Champions (1): 1993–94
