= Newton Aycliffe RUFC =

English rugby union club, based in Newton Aycliffe, County Durham

(England) Newton Aycliffe
- Full name: Newton Aycliffe Rugby Union Football Club
- Union: Durham RFU
- Founded: 1958; 68 years ago
- Location: Newton Aycliffe, County Durham, England
- League: Counties 3 Durham & Northumberland
- 2024-25: 9th

Official website
- www.pitchero.com/clubs/newtonaycliffe/

Newton Aycliffe RUFC is a rugby union team based in Newton Aycliffe, County Durham in north-east England, they are based at Newton Aycliffe Sports Club on Moore Lane. The first XV currently plays in Counties 3 Durham & Northumberland.

== History ==
The rugby club was founded in 1958.

Newton Aycliffe were relegated to Durham/Northumberland 3 after relegation from Durham/Northumberland 2 in 2018

Due to a lack of players, the club resigned from the League in 2021. The club has rebuilt itself and initially played in the Durham Tees Valley Social League before re-entering the League system.

Newton Aycliffe currently play in Counties 3 Durham and Northumberland.

The club is based at Newton Aycliffe Sports Club, Moore Lane, Newton Aycliffe.

== Honours ==
- Durham County Plate Winners (2) 2010-11, 2013-14
- Durham/Northumberland 3 Champions (2) 1992-93, 2016-17
- Durham/Northumberland 4 Champions (3) 1989-90, 1999-2000, 2003-04
