= Billingham RUFC =

English rugby union club

(England) Billingham
- Full name: Billingham Rugby Union Football Club
- Union: Durham County RFU
- Nickname: BRUFC
- Founded: 1924; 102 years ago
- Location: Billingham, County Durham, England
- Ground: Greenwood Road (Capacity: 1,500; 100 seats)
- Chairman: Mark Armstrong
- Coach: Peter Evans
- Captain: Elliott Husband
- League: National League 2 North
- 2025–26: 10th
Team kit

Official website
- billinghamrugby.co.uk

Billingham Rugby Union Football Club is a rugby union club based in Billingham in North East England. The 1st XV play in the fourth tier, National League 2 North, following their promotion from Regional 1 North East in 2023. The 2nd XV (Lions) plays in Counties 2 Durham & Northumberland South, the 3rd XV plays in Counties 3 Durham & Northumberland South and the Colts play in a Saturday Colts League. The junior section range from u-7 minis to u-16's with teams winning Durham county cups and leagues recently. Billingham play their home matches at Greenwood Road.

== History ==
Billingham Rugby Club was formed in 1924 as the rugby section of the Synthonia Sports Club at Synthetic Ammonia and Nitrates Company, which later became Imperial Chemical Industries (ICI). Once established, the club became a force in Durham County Rugby Union, especially after the Second World War and the first team was very strong during the 1950s and early 1960s.

The early 1970s saw a downturn in the chemical industry and with the decline of ICI, the rugby club suffered. In the late 1970s and throughout the 1980s the club became somewhat nomadic in its socialising, although still playing on Central Avenue.

1989 was an important year in the life of the club. The youth section was founded and boys and girls from the age of eight upwards playing mini-rugby. Since then, this section of the club has gone from strength to strength and has provided several current members of the first XV squad.

The 1990s saw an upturn in the club's fortunes and three teams were regularly playing each week with socialising based at the Synthonia Cricket Club.

The club moved to play on Greenwood Road in 1996 although until late 2000 there were no facilities whatsoever, just three pitches. For these years we had a three-site existence, changing, playing and socialising in different locations.

However, December 2000 and a £750,000 lottery grant brought the opening of the new clubhouse giving the club a solid base and identity.

In August 2021, former Billingham player Jack Smith won a gold medal as a member of Great Britain national wheelchair rugby team at the 2020 Summer Paralympics in Tokyo.

== Current standings ==
2026–27 National League 2 North table
Pos	Team	Pld	W	D	L	PF	PA	PD	TB	LB	Pts	Qualification
1	Sedgley Park	8	8	0	0	420	111	+309	8	0	40	Promotion place
2	Darlington Mowden Park	8	6	0	2	388	159	+229	7	1	32	Promotion play-off
3	Chester	8	6	0	2	315	214	+101	6	1	31	
4	Tynedale	8	6	0	2	252	221	+31	6	0	30	
5	Hull Ionians	7	5	0	2	276	220	+56	7	1	28	
6	Preston Grasshoppers	8	5	0	3	295	235	+60	6	1	27	
7	Harrogate	8	3	1	4	204	328	−124	6	0	20	
8	Sheffield Tigers	8	3	0	5	225	229	−4	5	3	20	
9	Fylde	8	3	0	5	198	253	−55	5	0	17	
10	Billingham	8	3	0	5	222	350	−128	5	0	17	
11	Huddersfield	8	2	1	5	202	362	−160	5	1	16	
12	Heath	8	2	0	6	188	282	−94	4	1	13	Relegation play-off
13	Otley	7	1	0	6	183	292	−109	4	1	9	Relegation place
14	Wharfedale	8	1	0	7	203	315	−112	5	0	9	Relegation place

Updated to match(es) played on 2 September 2026. Source: National League Rugby
Rules for classification: If teams are level at any stage, tiebreakers are applied in the following order:
1. Number of matches won
2. Number of matches drawn
3. Difference between points for and against
4. Total number of points for
5. Aggregate number of points scored in matches between tied teams
6. Number of matches won excluding the first match, then the second and so on until the tie is settled

== Honours ==
- Durham/Northumberland 3 Champions (2): 1993–94, 1996–97
- Durham/Northumberland 2 Champions: 1997–98
- Durham/Northumberland 1 Champions: 2007–08
- North Division 1 East champions (2): 2009–10, 2011–12
- Regional 1 North East Champions: 2022–23

== International players ==
- Christopher Hyndman – England under-21s and Northampton Saints
- Adam Radwan – England.
