= Seghill RFC =

Seghill
- Full name: Seghill Rugby Football Club
- Union: Northumberland RFU
- Founded: 1921; 104 years ago
- Location: Seghill, Northumberland, England
- League(s): Durham/Northumberland 3
- 2019–20: 6th

Official website
- seghillrfc.rfu.club

Seghill RFC is a rugby union team based in Seghill, Northumberland in north-east England. The club currently competes in Durham/Northumberland 3 the ninth tier of the English rugby union system.

== History ==
The rugby club was founded in 1921 due to the boredom during the 1921 coal stoppage, and revulsion from association football.

Seghill currently reside in Durham/Northumberland 3 since relegation from Durham/Northumberland 2 in 1995

== Honours ==
- Northumberland Senior Cup (4): 1925, 1929, 1930, 1932

== Notable players ==
- Bill Wallace, one Test match and 6 tour matches for the British & Irish Lions on the 1924 British Lions tour to South Africa.
