= Durham/Northumberland 4 =

Former English amateur rugby union competition

- Sport: Rugby Union
- Instituted: 1987; 39 years ago
- Ceased: 2006; 20 years ago
- Country: England
- Most titles: Newton Aycliffe (3 titles)
- Website: clubs.rfu.com

Durham/Northumberland 4 was a regional English rugby union league for teams from North East England which was at the tenth tier of national domestic competition when it folded in 2006. On its inception in 1987 it was the twelfth tire of national domestic competition. Promoted teams moved up to Durham/Northumberland 3 and there was no relegation as this was the basement division for the region. Ever decreasing numbers of teams caused the division to be cancelled at the end of the 2005-06 season with the majority of teams being promoted automatically to Durham/Northumberland 3.

== Final Season (2005-06) ==
Team	Ground	Capacity	City/Area	Previous season
Jarrovians	Community Centre		Hebburn, Tyne and Wear	4th
Seaham	Seaham Leisure Centre		Seaham, County Durham	Relegated from Durham/Northumberland 3 (10th)
Shildon Town	Sunnydale Leisure Centre		Shildon, County Durham	3rd
South Shields	Grosvenor Road		South Shields, Tyne and Wear	Relegated from Durham/Northumberland 3 (9th)

Locations of the 2005-06 Durham & Northumberland 4 teams

== Original teams ==
When league rugby began in 1987 this division contained the following teams:

- Barnard Castle
- Civil Service Durham
- Jarrovians
- Newton Aycliffe
- Prudhoe Hospital
- Richmondshire
- South Tyneside College
- Wensleydale

The league's numbers grew and declined throughout the years until the league was cancelled in 2006.

== Durham/Northumberland 4 Honours ==
=== Durham/Northumberland 4 (1987–1993) ===
The original Durham/Northumberland 4 was a tier 12 league with promotion up to Durham/Northumberland 3. It ran until the end of the 1991–92 season when it was cancelled.

Durham/Northumberland 4 Honours
Season	No of Teams	Champions	Runners–up	Relegated Teams
1987–88	8	Wensleydale	Prudhoe Hospital	No relegation
1988–89	10	Barnard Castle	South Tyneside College	No relegation
1989–90	7	Newton Aycliffe	Civil Service Durham	No relegation
1990–91	8	Richmondshire	Wearside	No relegation
1991–92	8	Jarrovians	Sedgefield (Note: Due to restructuring all eight teams in this league were promoted to Durham/Northumberland 3 as Durham/Northumberland 4 was abolished. The league was reinstated at a later date.)	No relegation
Green backgrounds are promotion places.

=== Durham/Northumberland 4 (1996–2006) ===
Durham/Northumberland 4 was reintroduced for the 1996–97 season as a tier 13 league. Northern league restructuring by the RFU at the end of the 1999-2000 season saw the cancellation of North East 1, North East 2 and North East 3 (tiers 7-9). This meant that Durham/Northumberland 4 became a tier 10 league until the division was cancelled for the second time at the end of the 2005–06 season.

Durham/Northumberland 4 Honours
Season	No of Teams	Champions	Runners–up	Relegated Teams
1996–97	7	Gosforth	Hartlepool Athletic	No relegation
1997–98	7	West Hartlepool Amateurs	Wearside	No relegation
1998–99	5	Jarrovians	Durham Constabulary	No relegation
1999–00	5	Newton Aycliffe (Note: No promotions this season as division set to increase from 5 to 7 teams for 2000-01.)	Yarm	No relegation
2000–01	7	Yarm	Newton Aycliffe	No relegation
2001–02	7	South Tyneside College	Richmondshire	No relegation
2002–03	7	Seaham	Wensleydale	No relegation
2003–04	7	Newton Aycliffe	Wearside Samurai	No relegation
2004–05	5	Hartlepool Athletic	Hartlepool B.B.O.B.	No relegation
2005–06	5	South Tyneside College	Jarrovians (Note: All teams apart from Shildon Town (who dropped out of the league) promoted to Durham/Northumberland 3 as this is the last season for Durham/Northumberland 4.)	No relegation
Green backgrounds are promotion places.

== Number of league titles ==
- Newton Aycliffe (3)
- Jarrovians (2)
- South Tyneside College (2)
- Barnard Castle (1)
- Gosforth (1)
- Hartlepool Athletic (1)
- Richmondshire (1)
- Seaham (1)
- Wensleydale (1)
- West Hartlepool Amateurs (1)
- Yarm (1)

== See also ==
- Durham RFU
- Northumberland RFU
- English rugby union system
- Rugby union in England
