= Durham County Rugby Football Union =

Governing body for rugby union in England

Durham County RFU
- Full name: Durham County Rugby Football Union
- Union: RFU
- Founded: 1876; 149 years ago
- Region: County Durham
- President: Andrew Openshaw
Team kit

Official website
- durhamrugby.com

The Durham County Rugby Football Union is the governing body for the sport of rugby union in the historic county of Durham in England. The union is the constituent body of the Rugby Football Union (RFU) for Durham County, it administers and organises rugby union clubs, competitions and Durham county rugby representative teams.

== History ==
Organized rugby union as we know it was first played in the county in 1850 when Durham School took up the game, and the first club side followed in 1863, when Darlington was formed. In October 1876 the Durham County Rugby Football Union was formed, with a preliminary meeting on 10 October followed by the first recorded meeting of representatives later that month on the 31st. The 31 October meeting was chaired by P.B. Junor and attended by representatives from six local clubs; Bensham, Darlington, Durham University, Houghton, Stockton, Sunderland and Westoe. The first recorded official of the Durham County RFU was J.B. Brooks, the chairman of Darlington, who became the honorary secretary and retained this title until 1980. An unofficial county side is believed to have played a match as early as March 1875, when they faced Yorkshire in Leeds

An official county team was formed soon after the creation of the Durham County RFU, with games in the early years largely restricted to meetings with nearby Yorkshire, and the majority of players were supplied by the two powerhouse clubs of the day, Darlington and Sunderland. In 1878 Durham went further afield, linking up with Northumberland to send a combined side down to face Lancashire in Manchester. As the union started to grow, new clubs appeared such as Hartlepool Rovers (1879) and West Hartlepool (1881). In the middle of this a Challenge Cup competition was introduced in 1880, giving the clubs proper competition and in turn increasing the popularity of rugby union in the region.

Durham became a member of the Rugby Football Union in 1882, and the advent of the County Championship in 1890 saw them among the first counties to take part in this illustrious competition. They won their first championship in 1900, beating Devon 11–3 in the final held at Exeter, and they quickly went on to dominate the County Championships. In between 1900 and 1910 they had appeared in all ten finals, coming away with six victories, one of which was shared with Devon. During this period of dominance, Durham boasted an overall record of having scored 740 points to their opponents 293.

The success enjoyed during the 20th century would start to fade, and although Durham made two further final appearances in 1914 and 1932 they were unable to add any further trophies. It was only until 1967 that they tasted success again, sharing the trophy with Surrey after two drawn games. In 1989 Durham won the County Championship for the eight time, defeating Cornwall 13–9 at Twickenham Stadium. Once one of the most decorated sides in the Championships, in recent times Durham have flickered back and forth between Division 1 and Division 2 of the championships, with their last Twickenham appearance being the 2014 County Championship Plate final which they lost 31–23 to Kent.

== Durham County senior men's county side ==
Durham County senior men's currently play in the Bill Beaumont Cup - the first division of the County Championship - having been promoted from the Division 2 at the end of the 2017–18 season.

Honours:

- County Championship winners (8): 1900, 1902, 1903, 1905, 1907, 1909, 1967, 1989 (Note: The 1907 and 1967 victories were shared with Devon and Surrey respectively after those games ended in draws.)
- County Championship Division 3 winners (2): 2007, 2009
- County Championship Division 2 winners: 2018

== Notable players for the County side ==
See Durham County RFU players

== Affiliated clubs ==
There are currently 30 clubs affiliated with the Durham County RFU, most of which have teams at both senior and junior level. Most clubs are based in County Durham but there are also teams from Tyne and Wear.

- Barnard Castle
- Billingham
- Bishop Auckland
- Blaydon
- Chester-le-Street
- Consett
- Darlington
- Darlington Mowden Park
- Darlington Mowden Park Elizabethans
- Durham City
- Gateshead
- Hartlepool
- Hartlepool B.B.O.B. (no league)
- Hartlepool Rovers
- Horden
- Houghton (Houghton-le-Spring)
- Jarrovians
- Newton Aycliffe
- Ryton
- Seaham
- Seaton Carew
- Sedgefield
- South Shields
- South Shields Westoe
- Stockton
- Sunderland
- Washington
- West Hartlepool
- Winlanton Vulcans
- Yarm

== County club competitions ==
The Durham County RFU currently runs the following competitions for club sides based in County Durham:

=== Leagues ===
- Durham/Northumberland 1 (alongside Northumberland RFU) - league ranked at tier 7 of the English rugby union system for clubs that are based in either County Durham, Northumberland or Tyne and Wear
- Durham/Northumberland 2 - tier 8 league
- Durham/Northumberland 3 - tier 9 league

=== Cups ===
Durham County RFU run the following cup competitions for 1st teams:

- Durham County RFU Senior Cup
- Durham County RFU Intermediate Cup
- Durham County RFU Junior Cup
- Durham County RFU Plate

As well as a number of cup competitions for 2nd, 3rd & 4th teams:

- Durham County RFU 2nd Team Cup
- Durham County RFU 3rd Team Cup
- Durham County RFU 4th Team Shield

Finally, there is also a cup competition for clubs in Hartlepool:

- Pyman Cup

=== Discontinued competitions ===
- Durham/Northumberland 4 - tier 10 league, discontinued in 2006

== See also ==
- Northern Division
- English rugby union system
