= Tyne Tees Tigers =

Names
- Full name: Tyne Tees Tigers; Australian Rules Football Club
- Nickname: Tigers
- Motto: "Tigers"

Club details
- Founded: 2012
- Colours: Black Gold
- Competition: AFL Scotland
- President: (England) Phil Martin
- Coach: (England) Anthony Brannigan
- Captain: (England) David Hodgson
- Ground: Broadway West, Gosforth "The Tigers Den"

Other information
- Official website: Official Website

The Tyne Tees Tigers are an Australian rules football club in North East England, England.

== History ==
The Tigers were founded in April 2012 from the remnants of the North East England league, which formerly comprised the Durham Saints, Gateshead Miners, Hartlepool Dockers, Middlesbrough Hawks, Newcastle Centurions and the Redcar Bombers.

The 2012 and 2013 seasons saw the Tigers playing as a social team in friendly matches and tournaments in and in 2014 the Tigers played their first competitive season having been voted in as a full member team of the AFLCNE.

In 2016 the Tigers found a new home in Gosforth Sports Association and triumphed against Merseyside Saints and Sheffield Thunder in the AFLCNE Plate competition to take their first League silverware. In 2017 the Tigers repeated this feat with a one sided victory over Merseyside Saints.

From 2018 the Tigers will be playing in the SARFL.

== Notable Members ==
Chris "Crafty" Medcraft, Tom Lally, Josh Tambakis, Travis ‘Trav’ Sperling, Harry ‘Haz’ Telfer (Scotland Capped), Matthew ‘Elmo’ Gallagher (Scotland and Great Britain Capped), Anthony ‘Roy’ Brannigan (Ex Captain, Coach, Great Britain and England Capped), David ‘Hodgy’ Hodgson (Captain, Great Britain and England Capped), David ‘Mini’ Rolt, Chris ‘Rog’ Rodger (Ex Coach), Phil Martin (President), Colum ‘Col’ Doherty (Treasurer)
