= Chester-le-Street Rugby Club =

Chester-le-Street
- Full name: Chester-le-Street Rugby Club
- Union: Durham County RFU
- Founded: 1979; 46 years ago
- Location: Chester-le-Street, County Durham, England
- Ground(s): Riverside Park
- League(s): Durham/Northumberland 3
- 2017-18: 10th

Official website
- www.chesterlestreetrfc.co.uk

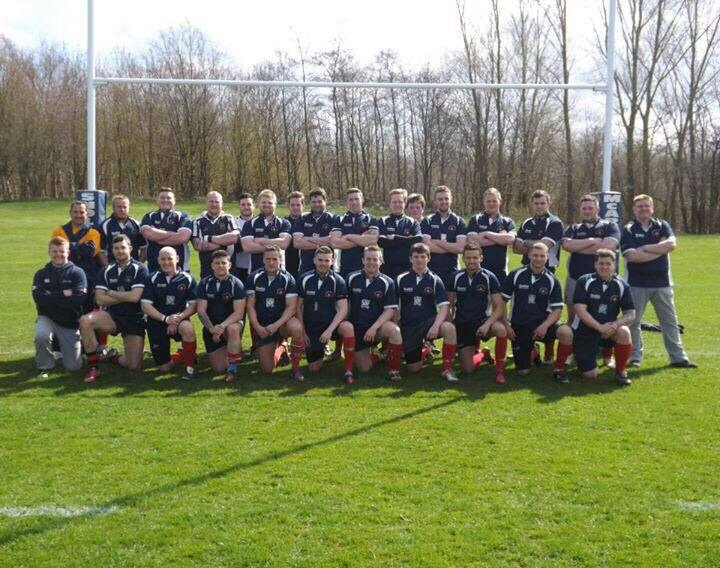
First Team 2013

Chester-le-Street Rugby Club is a rugby club situated in the town of Chester-le-Street, England, with the clubhouse in the Donald Owen Clarke Centre.
