= Derek Morgan (rugby union) =

British rugby union player (1935–2024)

- Full name: William George Derek Morgan
- Born: 30 November 1935 Newport, Wales
- Died: 24 May 2024 (aged 88)
- School: Lewis School, Pengam
- University: Durham University

Rugby union career
- Position: No. 8
International career
Years	Team	Apps	(Points)
1960–61	England	9	(0)
1960–61	Barbarians	4	(3)

William George Derek Morgan (30 November 1935 – 24 May 2024) was a Welsh-born England rugby union international.

Morgan was born in Newport, Wales, to an English father and Welsh mother. He was educated at Lewis School in the Rhymney Valley and came to England to study dentistry at Durham University, during which time he played for Medicals and made county appearances for Northumberland.

He played for Welsh Secondary Schools at under-19 level but his dual qualifications allowed him to later gain nine caps for England as a number eight. Morgan was first called up for the 1960 Five Nations, playing all four matches in a championship-winning side. He played against the Springboks at Twickenham the following year and in another Five Nations campaign. Morgan also played four times for the Barbarians scoring one of the two tries when the Barbarians defeated South Africa 6-nil in 1961 before his playing career was ended by a knee injury.

Morgan, a former practising dentist in south Wales, remained involved in rugby after retiring, as a coach and administrator. He coached the English and British Universities side, was manager of England's tour to New Zealand in 1985, was the England chairman of selectors and had a stint as President of the Rugby Football Union (2002-03).

Morgan died on 24 May 2024, at the age of 88.

== See also ==
- List of England national rugby union players
