= Darlington Mowden Park R.F.C. =

English rugby union club, based in Darlington

(England) Darlington Mowden Park
- Full name: Darlington Mowden Park Rugby Football Club
- Union: Durham County RFU
- Founded: 1946; 80 years ago
- Location: Darlington, County Durham, England
- Ground: The Darlington Arena (Capacity: 25,500)
- Coach(es): John Newton, Neil Young, Ritchie Young
- League: National League 2 North
- 2025–26: 5th
Team kit

Official website
- mowdenpark.com

Darlington Mowden Park is a professional rugby union club, based in Darlington, County Durham, England. They currently compete in National League 2 North, at the fourth tier of the English rugby union system, following relegation from the 2024–25 National League 1.

The club's former name, Darlington Grammar School Old Boys, was changed when they moved to Yiewsley Drive, which was located in Mowden. They relocated to The Darlington Arena, a 25,000 all-seater stadium in Darlington, purchasing the previously-vacated ground for £2 million; Yiewsley Drive had previously been sold to a housing estate company, and the Arena was previously owned by Darlington Football Club. They played their first game at the arena on 2 February 2013, in front of a crowd of over 1,000, comprehensively defeating Bromsgrove 62–7 in a National League 2 North league game. The club's 2nd XV joined the league system in 2026 when a decision was made to allow non-first 1st XV teams to compete in the leagues, and the club's 2nd XV was placed in Counties 2 Durham & Northumberland South.

== History ==
The club emerged in the post World War 2 period and was constituted in 1950 as Darlington Grammar School Old Boys.

In 1970–71 the Old Boys, with growing numbers of players and supporters, decided to buy land and build their own clubhouse and pitches. Mowden was chosen to be the new official home of the rapidly growing Old Boys club. It was deemed appropriate, not least because the club was no longer an "Old Boys Club", to change its name to Mowden Park RFC.

In the 1990s and 2000s Mowden Park (DMPRFC) experienced great success. Mowden rapidly went through the league system until they reached National Three North (now National league Two North), in which they spent many years. Mowden also had several years of excellent Tetley Bitter Cup runs. The Tetley Bitter Cup, the old LV Cup, included every English Rugby Union club. In 2000, while in the old North East 1, Mowden reached the 5th round (quarter-finals) of the Tetley Bitter cup after beating the prestigious London club Rosslyn Park in the 4th round in front of a home crowd of around 2,000+. In the fifth round they faced premiership opponents in the form of Harlequins at the Twickenham Stoop. The following years also saw further adventures in the National Cup. In 2001 Mowden once again defied league position and reached the 4th round of cup, only to narrowly lose to Birmingham & Solihull who, at the time, were in Allied-Dunbar Premiership 2. In 2002 they, once again, managed to get to the 4th round, only to narrowly lose at home to Manchester, who were in the old Allied Dunbar Premiership 2. Mowden 'legends' of this era included the likes of Tuihana, Keeligan, Brown, Lowe, Irwin, Mckinnon, Sinclair, Oliphant, Mitchell, Sanderson, Kent and Mattison. A newer cohort of legends include the Connon brothers, Zylon McGaffin, Alan 'Swags' Jones, Chris 'China' Peace, and Josh Waldin - who was later bestowed the honour of best looking man to ever play for the North East club.

Players in the upper echelons of the game to have graced Yiewlsey Drive and worn the Mowden Shirt, if but for a few games, include Toby Flood (England) and Craig Newby (New Zealand All Blacks) (both Leicester Tigers RFC), Alex Tait (Newcastle Falcons RFC), Peter Browne (Harlequins RFC), Phil Dowson (Northampton Saints RFC), Tim Visser (Edinburgh RFC + Scotland) and Richard Arnold (Newcastle Falcons RFC). Epi Taione (Newcastle, Sale Sharks and Racing Metro) put in some social appearances for the club. The club has also had mini and juniors go on to play in the Guinness Premiership – Ross Batty (Bath Rugby), Tom Catterick (Newcastle Falcons) and Alex Gray (London Irish).

They played in National League 2 North in the 2013–14 season. Having finished as runners-up, they qualified for the promotion playoff against 2013–14 National League 2 South runners-up, Ampthill. The game was played on 3 May 2014 at the Northern Echo Arena. The game finished 25–25 after normal time, so went to two 10-minute periods of extra time. The game was won with a try scored in the 3rd minute of added on time. As a result, they will play in National League 1 in the 2014–15 season, the highest league Darlington Mowden Park R.F.C. have reached in their history.]

== Current standings ==
2026–27 National League 2 North table
| Pos | Team | Pld | W | D | L | PF | PA | PD | TB | LB | Pts | Qualification |
|---|---|---|---|---|---|---|---|---|---|---|---|---|
| 1 | Sedgley Park | 8 | 8 | 0 | 0 | 420 | 111 | +309 | 8 | 0 | 40 | Promotion place |
| 2 | Darlington Mowden Park | 8 | 6 | 0 | 2 | 388 | 159 | +229 | 7 | 1 | 32 | Promotion play-off |
| 3 | Chester | 8 | 6 | 0 | 2 | 315 | 214 | +101 | 6 | 1 | 31 | |
| 4 | Tynedale | 8 | 6 | 0 | 2 | 252 | 221 | +31 | 6 | 0 | 30 | |
| 5 | Hull Ionians | 7 | 5 | 0 | 2 | 276 | 220 | +56 | 7 | 1 | 28 | |
| 6 | Preston Grasshoppers | 8 | 5 | 0 | 3 | 295 | 235 | +60 | 6 | 1 | 27 | |
| 7 | Harrogate | 8 | 3 | 1 | 4 | 204 | 328 | −124 | 6 | 0 | 20 | |
| 8 | Sheffield Tigers | 8 | 3 | 0 | 5 | 225 | 229 | −4 | 5 | 3 | 20 | |
| 9 | Fylde | 8 | 3 | 0 | 5 | 198 | 253 | −55 | 5 | 0 | 17 | |
| 10 | Billingham | 8 | 3 | 0 | 5 | 222 | 350 | −128 | 5 | 0 | 17 | |
| 11 | Huddersfield | 8 | 2 | 1 | 5 | 202 | 362 | −160 | 5 | 1 | 16 | |
| 12 | Heath | 8 | 2 | 0 | 6 | 188 | 282 | −94 | 4 | 1 | 13 | Relegation play-off |
| 13 | Otley | 7 | 1 | 0 | 6 | 183 | 292 | −109 | 4 | 1 | 9 | Relegation place |
| 14 | Wharfedale | 8 | 1 | 0 | 7 | 203 | 315 | −112 | 5 | 0 | 9 | Relegation place |

Updated to match(es) played on 2 September 2026. Source: National League Rugby
Rules for classification: If teams are level at any stage, tiebreakers are applied in the following order:
1. Number of matches won
2. Number of matches drawn
3. Difference between points for and against
4. Total number of points for
5. Aggregate number of points scored in matches between tied teams
6. Number of matches won excluding the first match, then the second and so on until the tie is settled

== Club information ==
=== Rivalries ===
Mowden are part of the rich fabric of rugby union in the North East. Rugby union is the North East's third sport, behind the Football and cricket. Mowden have enjoyed many good local rivalries over the years. The club's traditional rivals are Darlington RFC. Another traditional rivalry was with Darlington Railway Athletic RUFC, however Darlington RA RUFC finished operations in the 1990s.

=== Women's team ===
Darlington Mowden Park Sharks are a women's rugby union club based in England. The club competed in the Allianz Premier 15s, the top division of women's rugby union in England, alongside clubs such as Bristol Bears Women, Wasps Women, Saracens Women, and Harlequins Women. The club has included several internationally capped players, among them Tamara Taylor, Katy McLean, and Lindsay Wheeler. On 18 January 2011, McLean was named captain of the England Elite squad, succeeding Catherine Spencer. The club finished 10th in the 2020-21 Allianz Premier 15s season.

=== Development squads ===
DMPRFC currently have three senior teams and a sevens team:

- the first team operates on a professional basis in National League 1
- the second team play in the North Eastern CANDY League Division 1
- the third team also play in a local North Eastern league
- NCMP7 (Newitts Centurians Mowden Park 7s). During the off season, Mowden enter several 7s competitions, having teamed up with Newitts Centurions, with 1st XV players and guests normally making up the teams.

DMPRFC provide rugby union at every level. DMPRFC have teams at every level from under-7s to under-12s. Boys and girls play together in these teams.

DMPRFC have a boys team at every level from under-13s to under-18s. Many of the boys go on to represent county and above at their respective age groups. Once junior level has finished most will move on to the colts or one of the senior teams.

DMPRFC also provides separate junior girls teams once mini rugby has finished. There is also the prospect of playing in the Women's Premiership with the Darlington Mowden Park Sharks.

=== Club colours ===
Home: The traditional colours are a royal blue and white hoops shirt, royal blue shorts and royal blue socks with white.

Away: Grey shirt with grey shorts and socks.

=== Stadia ===
DMP play at The Darlington Arena, a 25,000-seat stadium in the town. The stadium is now called the Northern Echo Arena as it sponsored by the Northern Echo news and media company.

The New Zealand All Blacks used the stadium as a base during the 2015 Rugby World Cup.

== Honours ==
- Durham Senior Cup winners (7): 1998, 1999, 2000, 2003, 2007, 2016, 2017
- Durham/Northumberland 2 champions: 1987–88
- Durham/Northumberland 1 champions: 1993–94
- North East 2 champions: 1997–98
- North East 1 champions: 1998–99
- North Division 2 champions: 1999–00
- National League 3 North champions (2): 2000–01, 2011–12
- National League 2 (north v south) promotion play-off winner: 2013–14
