= West Hartlepool R.F.C. =

English rugby union club

Coordinates: 54°40′35″N 1°14′5″W

(England) West Hartlepool
- Full name: West Hartlepool Rugby Football Club
- Union: Durham County RFU
- Founded: 1881; 145 years ago
- Location: Hartlepool, County Durham, England
- Ground: Brinkburn (Capacity: 4,000 (100 seats))
- Coach(es): Chris Webb; Peter Youll; Andrew Rollins; Andrew Turner
- League: Regional 2 North
- 2024–25: 4th
Team kit

Official website
- official.sportnetwork.net/main/west-hartlepool--official/s16.htm

West Hartlepool Rugby Football Club (nicknamed West) is an English rugby union club. The club's 1st XV plays in Regional 2 North in the sixth tier of the English rugby union system, its 2nd XV, West Hartlepool Stags plays in Counties 2 Durham & Northumberland South and its 3rd XV participates in Counties 3 Durham & Northumberland South.

== History ==
West Hartlepool Rugby Football Club was formed in 1881.

Before the game turned professional, the club enjoyed several seasons in the Courage League and Allied Dunbar premiership during the 1990s before finally being relegated in the 1998–99 season. There followed a drop through the divisions over the next three years that took them out of the national leagues and into the regional leagues.

In the 1990s, when the club was at its peak positions they played at Brierton Lane. In 1990 Brierton Lane was estimated by a club official to have a ground capacity of around 4,950–450 seated and 4,500 standing. This was likely a conservative estimate as West Hartlepool achieved a crowd of 7,000 against Newcastle Gosforth on 14 March 1992, and would regularly attract crowds of around 4,000, making them more popular at the time than the association football side Hartlepool United.

When the ground was sold they entered into one year ground share agreements, first with Hartlepool United Football Club at Victoria Park and then with Hartlepool Rovers RFC.

The club's Junior Section then went on to play at West Hartlepool Technical Day School Old Boys RUFC (Tech) for a few years and in the early 2000s there was an agreement with the Hartlepool Sixth Form College for the whole club to play at Brinkburn which is located on Catcote Road.

== Honours ==
- Durham Senior Cup winners (15): 1900, 1902, 1904, 1949, 1952, 1955, 1971, 1972, 1982, 1983, 1984, 1985, 1986, 1989, 2015
- Courage National 3 champions 1990–91
- North Division 1 East champions (2): 2007–08, 2010–11
- Durham/Northumberland 1 v Yorkshire 1 promotion play-off winner: 2018–19
- Counties 1 Durham & Northumberland champions: 2022–23

== Club structure ==
West have two Senior Teams within the club.

- 1st team
- 2nd team (Stags)
- Vets team
- Walking rugby team

== International honours ==
Nationality	Player	Honours
	Carl Aarvold	England
	Sammy Morfitt	England
	Tim Stimpson	England (and British & Irish Lions)
	Jack Taylor	England (captain)
	Rob Wainwright	Scotland (captain) (and British & Irish Lions)
	Leonard West	Scotland
	Mike Mullins	Ireland
	Alan Whetton (AJ)	New Zealand
	Gary Whetton	New Zealand (Captain)
	Mike Brewer	New Zealand
	Troy Jaques	Australia
	Jim Williams	Australia

== Other international honours ==
Nationality	Player	Honours
	Sean Dougall	Ireland U18s, U19s & U20s
	Micky Young	England U-16 & U-18, England Sevens and England Saxons
	Chris Murphy	England Colts, England Students, U-21 (Captain) & England A
	Simon Mitchell	England A

== Mini and junior ==
West have a successful mini & junior set up with teams from Little Deers to under-18 with a large percentage going on to represent Durham County & The North.

West Little Deers were introduced in 2017 and are for children aged 2–6, giving them an introduction to rugby.

== Rivals ==
In the 1990s when West Hartlepool were in the top leagues there was a rivalry with Newcastle Gosforth (now the Newcastle Falcons). However, the real derby matches were with Hartlepool Rovers. Even though Rovers have always been in lower league, the historical Boxing Day match between the sides has continued and Rovers have always given West Hartlepool good competitive matches, beating West in the 2008 Boxing Day derby, but West have won all the other years. In recent years the games have come down to the last few seconds or injury time before the eventual winners were known, with side line conversions winning or losing matches.
