= Bullocksteads Sports Ground =

Sports venue in Newcastle upon Tyne, England

Coordinates: 55.018°N 1.68°W

Bullocksteads Sports Ground is a rugby and football facility in Newcastle upon Tyne, England. It is situated next to the Kingston Park stadium.

It is the former home of Gosforth RFC. It has 13 grass pitches. Northumbria University and Premiership Rugby team, the Newcastle Falcons, planned to turn it into a Rugby Development Centre. The sports ground was sold to Newcastle City Council in 2017.
