= Alnwick RFC =

English rugby union club, based in Alnwick

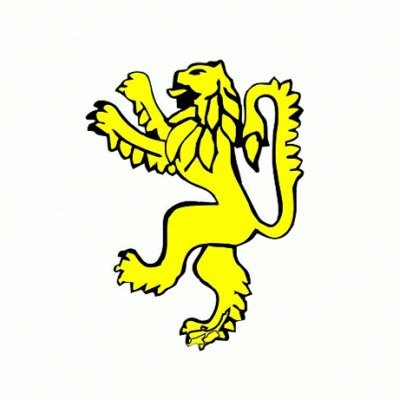
- Full name: Alnwick Rugby Football Club
- Union: Northumberland RFU
- Founded: 1960; 66 years ago
- Location: Alnwick, Northumberland, England
- Ground: Greensfield (Capacity: 1,200 (200 in stand))
- Coach(es): (South Africa) Michael van Vuuren and (Scotland) Ally Hogg
- Captain: (England) Richard Elliot
- League: Regional 1 North East
- 2024–25: 5th
1st kit	2nd kit

Largest win
- Alnwick RFC 83–0 Redcar RUFC (2010)

Largest defeat
- New Brighton FC 90-5 Alnwick RFC (1995)

Official website
- www.pitchero.com/clubs/alnwick/

Alnwick RFC is an amateur rugby union club based in the town of Alnwick, Northumberland in north-east England. The club play in Regional 1 North East, a level five league in the English rugby union system and are the most northerly rugby union club in English league rugby, (Berwick RFC play in the Scottish rugby union system). Alnwick regularly field three senior sides, all of which play competitive league and cup rugby. The First XV plays in Regional 1 North East and the Second XV participates in North East Counties 2 (North). The club also has a junior section running teams from under 7's through to under 18's and a girls section.

== Beginnings ==
The club was originally formed on 9 December 1880, following a meeting in the Star Hotel. The name The Hotspur was adopted, a reference to the famous Alnwick knight Harry Hotspur. W.Newman was elected as the captain. Mrs Rennison of The Star Hotel offered a field on the outskirts of the town, known as Wagonway.

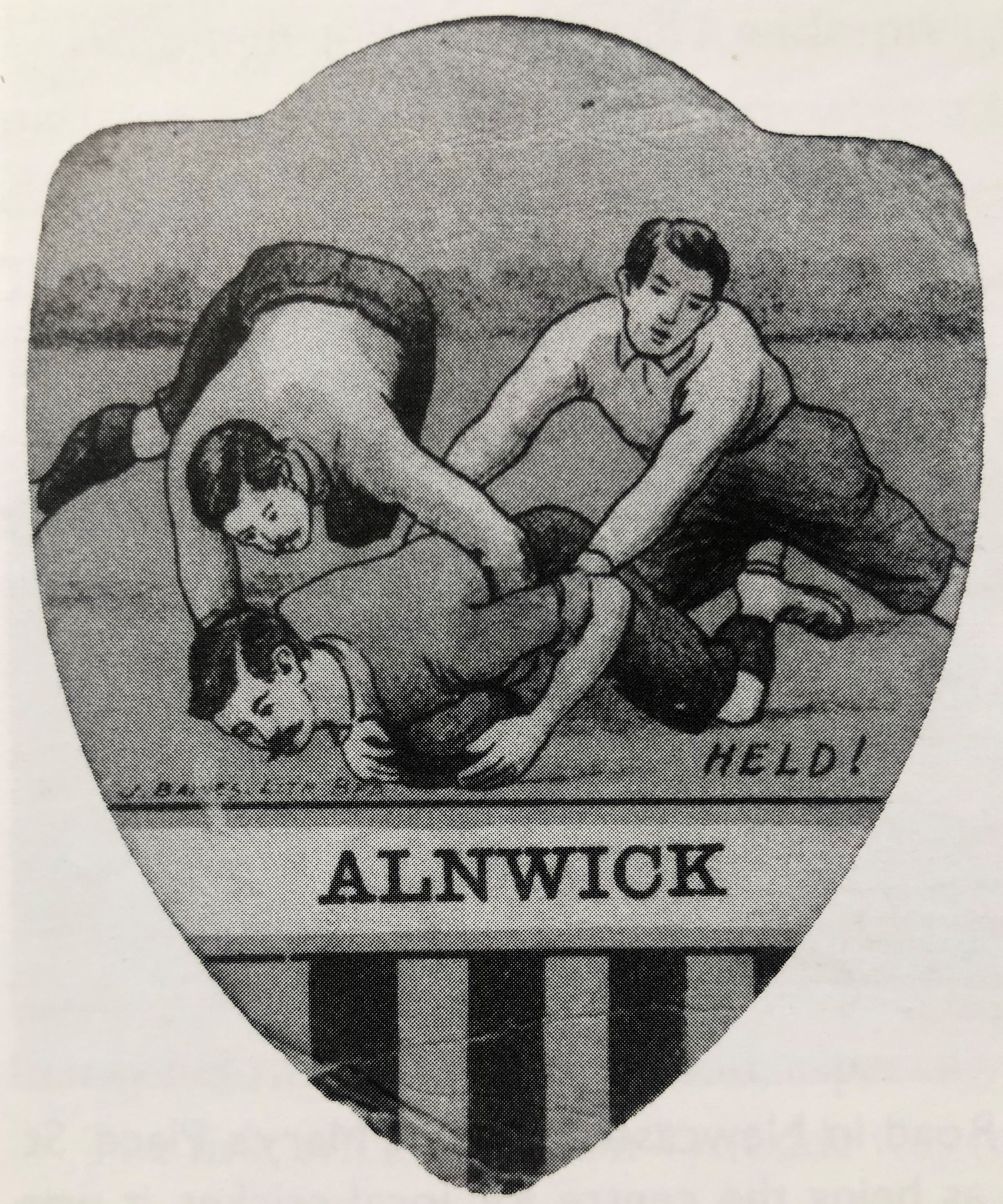
A Victorian supporter card depicting rugby in Alnwick from the 1880s

The first fixture was away against Jesmond on 22 October 1881. This game ended in a 0–0 draw. The first home fixture took place on 5 November 1881, Rockcliffe were the visitors and this was the first game played under rugby union laws. A large crowd attended to witness the first rugby game in the town, they were not disappointed as The Hotspur won by 1 goal and 3 touchdowns. Further fixtures were played against a Gosforth team and Rockcliffe.

The Hotspur had a full fixture list for the 1882/83 season including games against Northern, Gosforth and Rockcliffe, fixtures that are still maintained today. In May 1884 a joint meeting took place between The Hotspur, Guild and other Football Clubs. During this meeting it was decided they would combine to form the Alnwick Association Football Club.

Fifty years then elapsed until the game of Rugby was re-introduced in the town in 1933 under the Presidency of Stan Anderson who as a Rockcliffe player, represented England in 1899. For some years the club flourished with such stalwarts as Duncan Hodgson, Robert Hoigg and Harry Green forming the nucleus. The club house was the Plough Hotel, the ground at Denwick Mill. Difficulties in getting players finally saw the game abandoned in 1937.

After the Second World War, efforts were made to revive the club but without success largely because there was no regular local source of players. In 1950 the picture changed, the Duke School changed over to rugby union. There was now a ready source of players and the demand for a revival of the club grew. An open meeting was held on 12 April 1960, presided over by Bobby Robinson of Northern FC. The club was reformed and matches were played in the season 1960/61.

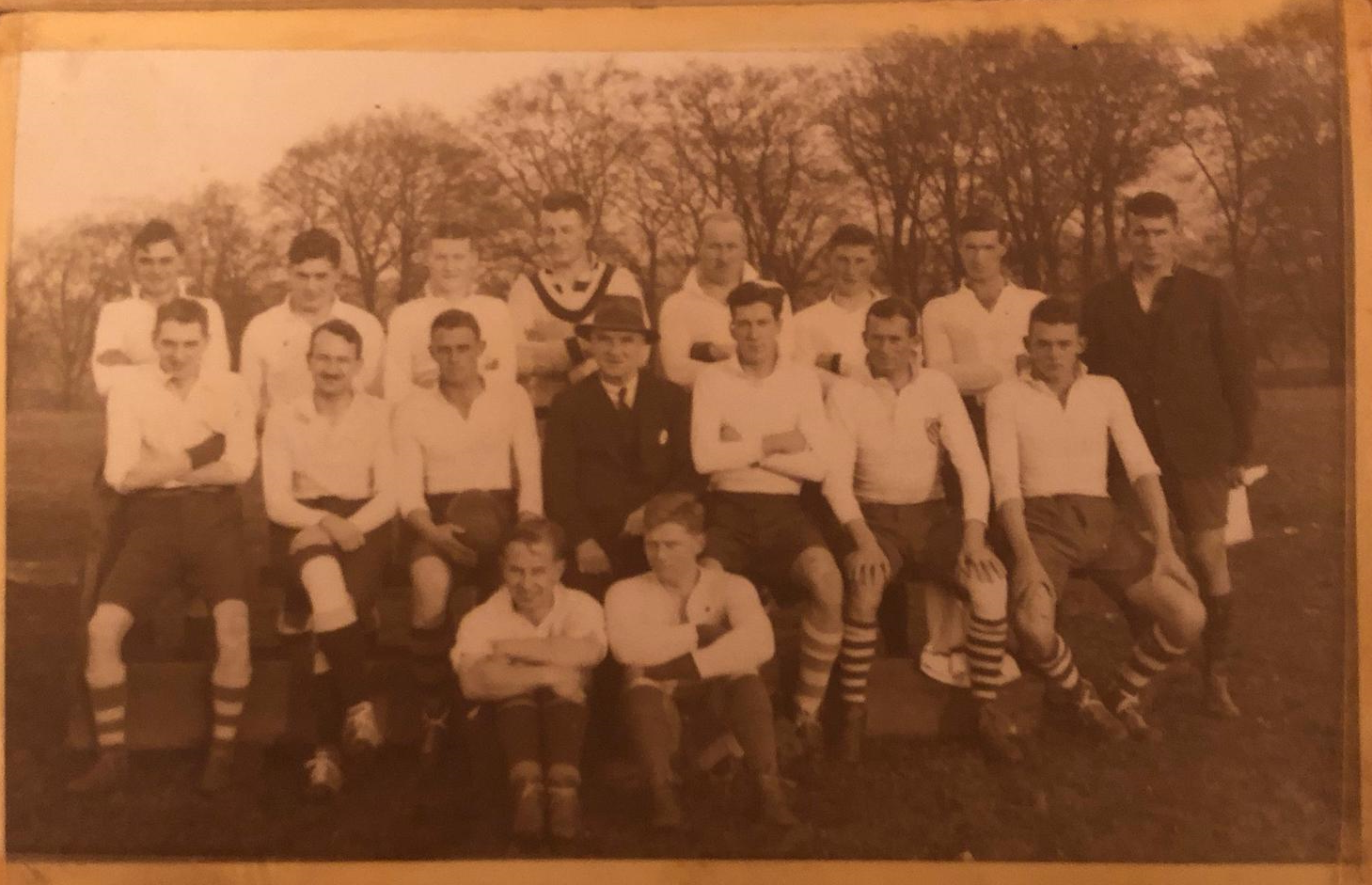
Alnwick's first game after reforming, 10 September 1960 Gosforth IIIa 27 - 6 Alnwick.

His Grace The Duke of Northumberland agreed to be Patron of the club whilst S.O. Williams, a patron of Llanelli Rugby Club accepted the Presidency of the club with Alan Churchill elected as captain. The club obtained the use of a field at Greensfield Moor as a pitch and accommodation for changing bathing and a clubroom was again made available at the Plough Hotel. A permanent headquarters was found when the Duke of Northumberland offered a long lease of land for use as a club ground and headquarters at Greensfield.

== League history ==
The 1987/88 season saw the formation of rugby union leagues in England which placed Alnwick in level six league then known as North 2. The first league fixture was a home game against Davenport on 12 September 1987, the game finished 10-9 in Alnwick's favour. In the inaugural league season, the closest club to Alnwick was Aspatria over 100 miles away. North 2 was an 11 team league with only one fixture played against each club. In 1987/88 the Aspatria fixture was played at Alnwick meaning the shortest journey Alnwick made for a league game was 150 miles to visit Halifax. Alnwick remained in level six until the 2002/03 season when they were relegated to the level seven Durham & Northumberland 1. The winners of Durham & Northumberland 1 are automatically promoted, with the second placed team going into a play-off promotion game against the second place team from Yorkshire 1.

The 2003/04 campaign saw Alnwick finish in second place in Durham & Northumberland 1, meaning they faced the second placed team from Yorkshire 1, Pontefract RFC in the play-off for promotion. The game saw Alnwick claw back a 10-18 deficit to claim a thrilling 25-18 victory, with 5 minutes remaining the score was 17-18 in Pontefract's favour. Alan Moses' late 40-yard drop goal and a last gasp try from Jon Snaith sealed the victory and promotion back into North 1 East, then known as North 2 East. This was the first time a club from the Durham and Northumberland region had won the Durham/Northumberland 1 v Yorkshire 1 promotion playoff fixture. They remained at this level for two seasons. At the end of the 2005/06 campaign Alnwick were relegated back to Durham & Northumberland 1 after finishing the North 2 East campaign in 10th position.

After a four-season rebuilding period in Durham & Northumberland 1, Alnwick produced a young team, captained by the prolific try-scoring wing Andrew Shell. The 2010/11 season saw the club finish in third position in Durham & Northumberland 1. The following campaign saw Alnwick go one better and finish in second place, and face Keighley RUFC, who finished second in Yorkshire 1, in a play-off for promotion. Alnwick went into half time with a 16–3 lead. The second half saw Keighley fight back to win 18–16 and seal promotion to the restructured level six league North 1 East.

In 2012/13 Alnwick were promoted to North 1 East. They clinched promotion by finishing as champions of Durham & Northumberland 1 with a 10–28 victory against Medicals RFC in the final game of the season.

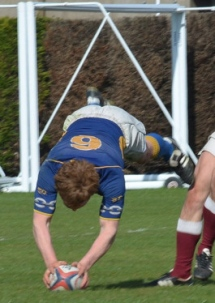
Gordon Smith scoring the bonus point try, against Medicals RFC in the final game of the 2012/13 season to seal the Durham & Northumberland 1 title

The 2013/14 season resulted in Alnwick finishing the North 1 East campaign in 11th position and narrowly avoiding relegation back to Durham & Northumberland 1 on the final day of the season. This was the first time since Northern and Team Northumbria in the 2010-11 season, that a newly promoted club from Durham & Northumberland 1 had avoided relegation from North 1 East.

Alnwick's 2014/15 season, the second back in level six resulted in a creditable 7th-place finish. The 2014/15 campaign proved to be more comfortable for Alnwick in comparison to the 2013/14 relegation battle with more games being won than lost, some notable performances and a terrific victory against Northumberland neighbours Percy Park.

2015/16 season Alnwick pipped West Hartlepool to 3rd in North 1 East after a convincing 10-43 victory at league champions Doncaster Phoenix in the last game of the season.

2016/17 season Alnwick finished 4th in North 1 East where a chance at promotion faded in the last two months of the season.

The 2017/18 season finished with Alnwick as champions of North 1 East, Alnwick sealed the North 1 East title with a 10–34 victory against local rivals Morpeth, on the final day of the season. Alnwick gained promotion to the level 5 league North Premier, the highest league level the club has ever competed at.

The 2018/19 season finished with Alnwick in midtable of North Premier. Alnwick comfortably adapted to life at level 5 and were never in relegation danger. Alnwick won more games than they lost, the most impressive victory coming away against Harrogate, in the first meeting between Alnwick and the prestigious Yorkshire club.

The 2019/20 season finished with Alnwick narrowly avoiding relegation after the final table was completed using a best playing record formula. Due to the COVID-19 pandemic in the United Kingdom, the Rugby Football Union (RFU) officially cancelled the season on 20 March 2020. At that point Alnwick were in 11th place in the table with 38 points and 5 games remaining. The best playing record formula awarded Alnwick a further 10 points from their remaining 5 games, meaning they finished 1 point above Carlisle who were relegated. Alnwick's most impressive victory came at home against champions Blaydon, in the first league win for Alnwick over the Tyneside club.

The 2021–22 season finished with Alnwick in seventh position in North Premier, the highest league position in the club's history. Four defeats from the last seven games of the season saw a likely fifth place finish slip down two positions. Alnwick responded well after the 18 month COVID-19 break in league rugby, the most impressive victory coming away against Preston Grasshoppers, in the first league meeting between Alnwick and the distinguished Lancashire club.

The RFU reorganised leagues at level 5 after the 2021-22 season and the North Premier league was discontinued. Alnwick were placed into a newly created level-5 league, Regional 1 North East, for 2022–23.

The 2022–23 season finished with Alnwick in fourth position in Regional 1 North East, the highest league position in the club's history. Away defeats against Driffield and Heath saw a possible second place finish slip down two positions. The most impressive victory coming at home against league winners Billingham.

The 2023–24 season finished with Alnwick in fifth position in Regional 1 North East. Poor away form hampered a potential promotion challenge. An impressive away victory 28-30 against runners up Heath was the highlight of a mixed league campaign.

Season	League Name	Level	Position (League Size)	P	W	D	L	PF	PA	+/-	Notes
1987/88	North 2	6	5th (11)	10	6	0	4	125	75	+50	11 teams in league. One fixture played against each team in the league
1988/89	North 2	6	5th (11)	10	6	0	4	104	110	-6	One fixture played against each team in the league
1989/90	North 2	6	6th (11)	10	5	0	5	141	124	+50	One fixture played against each team in the league
1990/91	North 2	6	4th (11)	10	5	1	4	127	124	+3	One fixture played against each team in the league
1991/92	North 2	6	8th (11)	10	4	1	5	118	99	+19	One fixture played against each team in the league
1992/93	North 2	6	6th (13)	12	8	0	4	227	152	+75	League size increased to 13 teams. One fixture played against each team in the league
1993/94	North 2	6	5th (13)	12	7	2	3	200	93	+107	One fixture played against each team in the league
1994/95	North 2	6	10th (13)	12	4	0	8	155	244	-89	One fixture played against each team in the league
1995/96	North 2	6	5th (13)	12	6	1	5	190	202	-12	One fixture played against each team in the league
1996/97	North 2	6	5th (12)	22	12	1	9	540	425	+115	League size reduced to 12 teams. Introduction of home and away fixtures against each team in the league
1997/98	North 2	6	9th (12)	22	8	0	14	361	449	-88	-
1998/99	North 2	6	10th (12)	22	7	1	14	305	395	-90	-
1999/00	North 2	6	5th (12)	22	12	1	9	355	464	-109	Last season that Level 6 covered the whole of the north.
2000/01	North 2 East	6	8th (12)	16	8	0	8	297	274	+23	Level 6 in the north split into two leagues, East and West. Fixtures not completed due to foot and mouth disease
2001/02	North 2 East	6	6th (12)	22	9	2	11	373	371	+2	-
2002/03	North 2 East	6	10th (12)	22	5	1	16	341	584	-243	Relegated to Durham & Northumberland 1
2003/04	Durham & Northumberland 1	7	2nd (12)	23	18	2	3	569	241	+328	Promoted after winning playoff against Pontefract 25-18
2004/05	North 2 East	6	4th (12)	22	11	2	9	382	444	-62	-
2005/06	North 2 East	6	10th (12)	22	6	0	16	307	546	-239	Relegated to Durham & Northumberland 1
2006/07	Durham & Northumberland 1	7	5th (12)	22	10	0	12	489	375	114	-
2007/08	Durham & Northumberland 1	7	7th (12)	22	10	1	11	384	463	-79	-
2008/09	Durham & Northumberland 1	7	3rd (12)	22	16	0	6	452	324	+128	-
2009/10	Durham & Northumberland 1	7	5th (14)	24	15	2	7	551	432	+119	League size increased to 14 teams. Fixtures not completed due to bad weather
2010/11	Durham & Northumberland 1	7	3rd (14)	26	21	0	5	889	398	+491	-
2011/12	Durham & Northumberland 1	7	2nd (14)	27	21	0	6	870	385	+472	Lost playoff against Keighley RUFC 16-18
2012/13	Durham & Northumberland 1	7	1st (14)	26	23	0	3	763	340	+423	Promoted as champions
2013/14	North 1 East	6	11th (14)	26	9	1	16	459	572	-113	Avoided relegation by gaining a losing bonus point, in the final game of the season against Middlesbrough RUFC
2014/15	North 1 East	6	7th (14)	26	13	1	12	592	552	+40	-
2015/16	North 1 East	6	3rd (14)	26	18	0	8	660	322	+338	-
2016/17	North 1 East	6	4th (14)	26	17	1	8	698	368	+330	-
2017/18	North 1 East	6	1st (14)	26	20	2	4	830	367	+463	Promoted as champions
2018/19	North Premier	5	9th (14)	26	14	0	12	531	500	+31	-
2019/20	North Premier	5	11th (14)	21	7	0	14	328	488	-160	Fixtures not completed due to COVID-19
2020/21	North Premier	5	NA	0	0	0	0	0	0	0	Fixtures not played due to COVID-19
2021/22	North Premier	5	7th (14)	26	14	1	11	854	291	+563	Last season that Level 5 covered the whole of the north.
2022/23	Regional 1 North East	5	4th (12)	22	16	0	6	629	460	+169	League size reduced to 12 teams. Level 5 in the north split into two leagues, East and West.
2023/24	Regional 1 North East	5	5th (12)	22	13	0	9	515	571	-56	-
			Totals	729	404	24	301	15711	12896	+2815	55% win percentage

== Local rivalries ==
Each season Alnwick play against local rivals Berwick, Northern and Morpeth for a trophy.

The annual Alnwick v Berwick fixture contested for the Claret Jug takes place on the traditional derby date of Boxing Day. The venue for this fixture alternates between the clubs each year and often attracts the largest attendance of the season. The fixture is deemed as a special occasion by both sets of players and supporters alike, despite being local rivals the two clubs play in separate league structures meaning the clubs will never meet in a league fixture. This results in the Boxing Day clash being a fiercely contested game often settled by a single point.

- Alnwick v Berwick - Claret Jug. Current holders Alnwick
- Alnwick v Northern - Andrew Bell Trophy. Current holders Alnwick
- Alnwick v Morpeth - Bret Fuel Silver Horse. Current holders Alnwick

== Cup competitions ==
Alnwick have featured in 14 Northumberland Senior Cup Finals, winning the cup on 7 occasions.

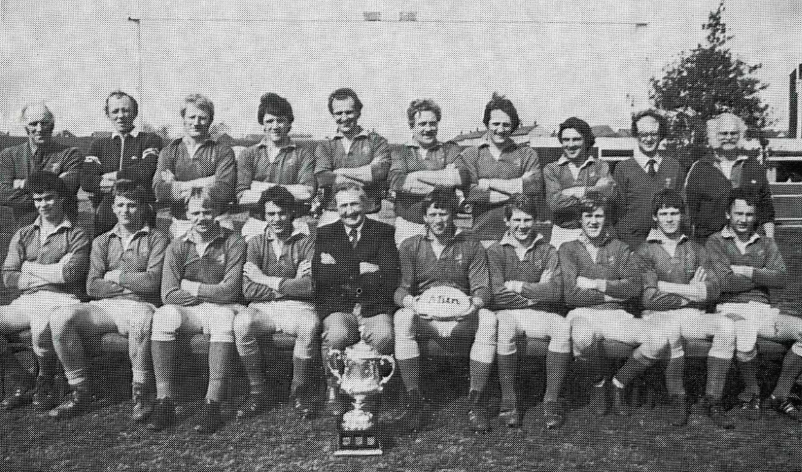
Northumberland Senior Cup winners 1983/84

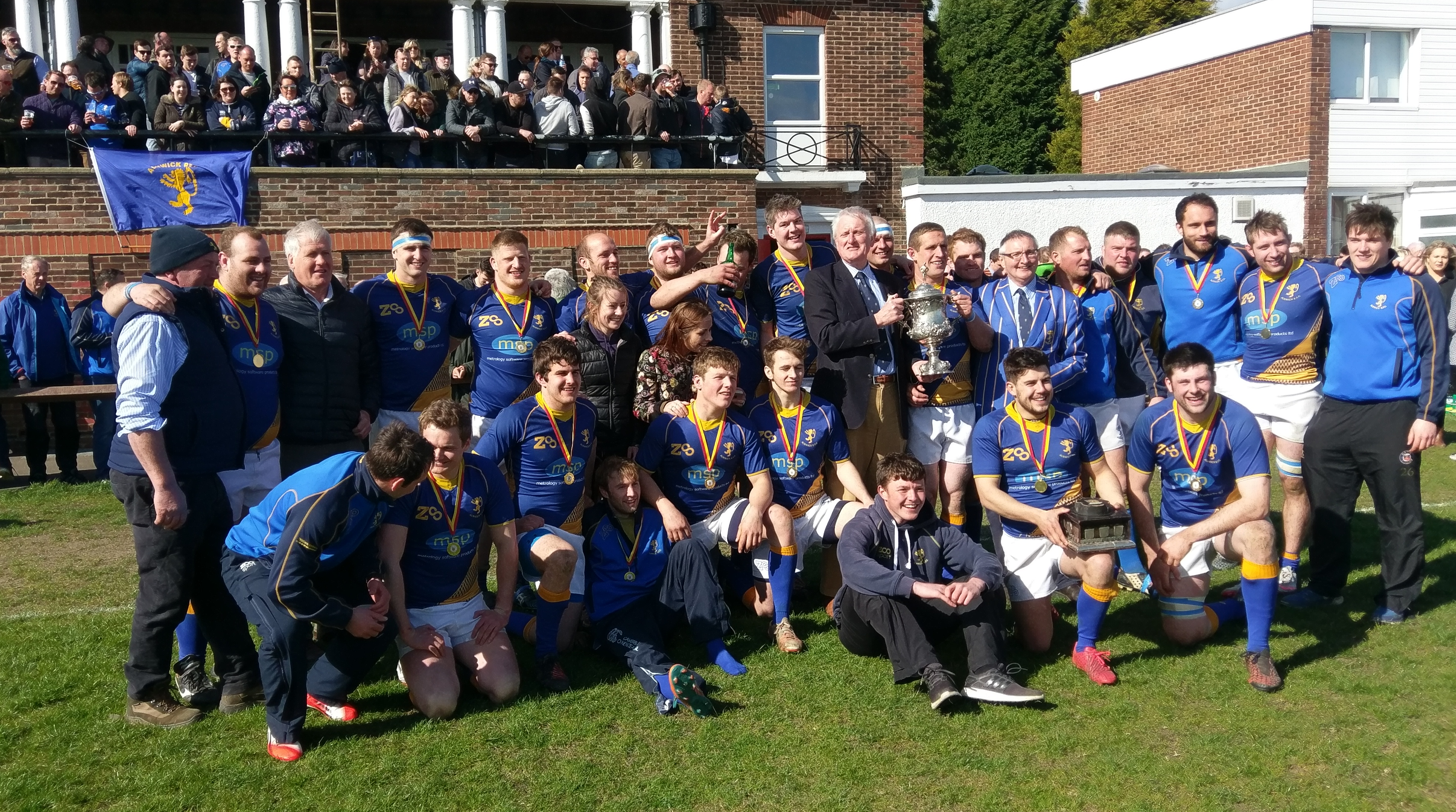
Northumberland Senior Cup winners 2016/17

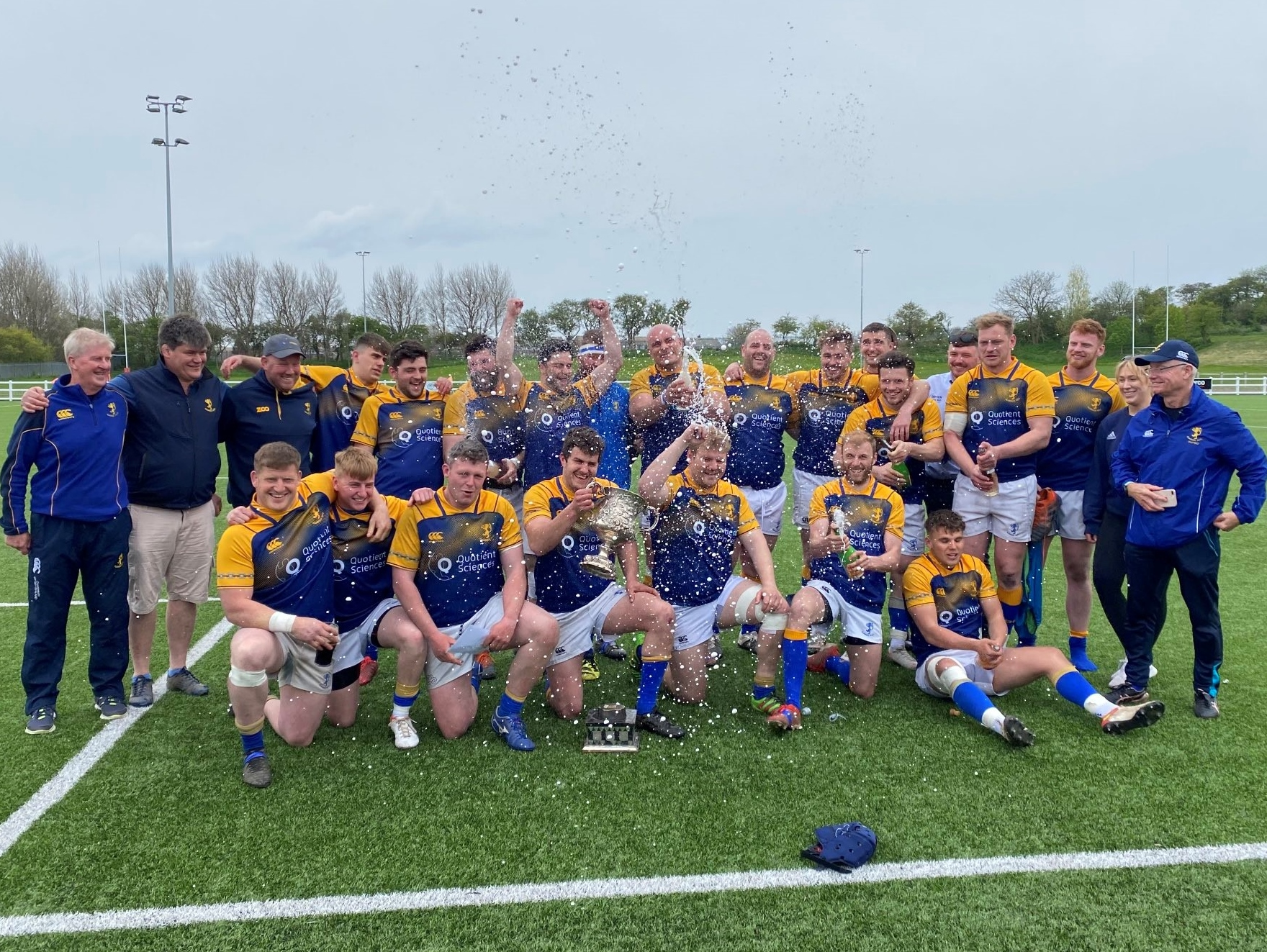
Northumberland Senior Cup winners 2021/22

Season	Winners	Score	Runners Up	Venue
1972/73	Gosforth	21-9	Alnwick	Northumberland County Ground
1977/78	Gosforth	38-3	Alnwick	Northumberland County Ground
1979/80	Gosforth	21-9	Alnwick	Northumberland County Ground
1982/83	Gosforth	24-6	Alnwick	Northumberland County Ground
1983/84	Alnwick	6-4	Gosforth	Northumberland County Ground
1998/99	Tynedale	24-10	Alnwick	Tynedale Park
2016/17	Alnwick	11-7	Morpeth	Sutherland Park
2017/18	Percy Park	21-16	Alnwick	Welfare Park
2018/19	Alnwick	39-3	Morpeth	Scremerston
2019/20	Morpeth	11-10	Alnwick	Greensfield
2021/22	Alnwick	61-14	Novocastrians	Whitley Bay Rockcliff
2023/24	Alnwick	31-8	Northern FC	Mitford Road
2024/25	Alnwick	28-23	Northern FC	Greensfield
2025/26	Alnwick	29-0	Northern FC	McCracken Park

In the 1983/84 season Alnwick reached the Northumberland Senior Cup final for the fifth time, as in the previous 4 occasions Gosforth were the opponents. Gosforth had won the cup every year since 1970/71 season, including four victories over Alnwick in 1972/73, 1977/78, 1879/80 and 1982/83. The final took place at the Northumberland County Ground on 18 April 1984. Gosforth fielded a side including 3 Internationals, S.Bainbridge, J.Pollock and W.Breakey. Alnwick battled to a 6-4 victory over their much fancied opponents, with two penalty goals kicked by Dawson Lillie winning the cup for Alnwick.

In the 2016/17 season Alnwick reached the Northumberland Senior Cup final. They faced local rivals Morpeth in the fixture staged at Novocastrians RFC ground, Sutherland Park. Alnwick took a 6-0 lead in to half time, thanks to two long range penalty goals from James Bird. Morpeth took the lead in the 2nd half via a converted Try, leading 7-6 with 5 minutes to go in the match and a strong wind behind them. Alnwick managed to turn the ball over in the Morpeth 22 area allowing James Warcup to score a dramatic unconverted try and give Alnwick an 11-7 lead. Strong defence during the last plays of the game allowed Alnwick to hold on for the victory and lift the Northumberland Senior Cup for the first time since 1983/84.

Before professionalism came in to rugby union, the winner and runner-up from each County Cup competition in England competed in the National Cup Competition, now known as the Anglo-Welsh Cup. Alnwick qualified for the 1st round of the National Cup Competition in each of the following seasons.

Season	Home team	Score	Away team
1980/81	Alnwick	0-12	Broughton Park
1983/84	Flyde	43-21	Alnwick
1984/85	Alnwick	0-34	Wakefield
1999/00	Stourbridge	20-8	Alnwick

== Women's Rugby ==
In July 2022, the Senior Women's team was reinstated by current co-captains Rosanna Curtis and Becky Dyson. For the first season the team faced local teams in a variety of disciplines (7s, 10's 12's and 15's) including Berwick Black Diamonds, Tynedale, and Gala.

The 2023/24 season saw the side enter in to the Allianz Inner Warrior Development League, North (North). The season saw opponents including Whitley Bay Rockcliffe Roses, Peterlee & Horden, Acklam and Jarrow. The team won the league, and entered in to the RFU National Challenge 3 league for the 2024/25 season.

== Facilities ==
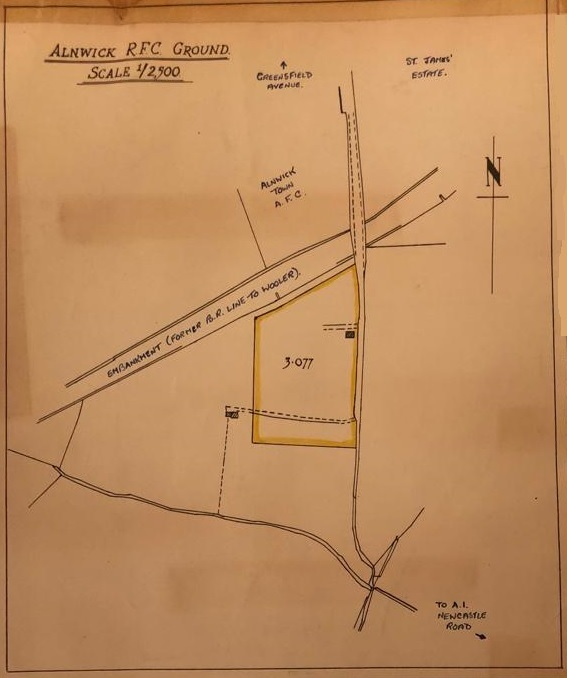
Alnwick RFC proposed new ground at Greensfield. February 1961

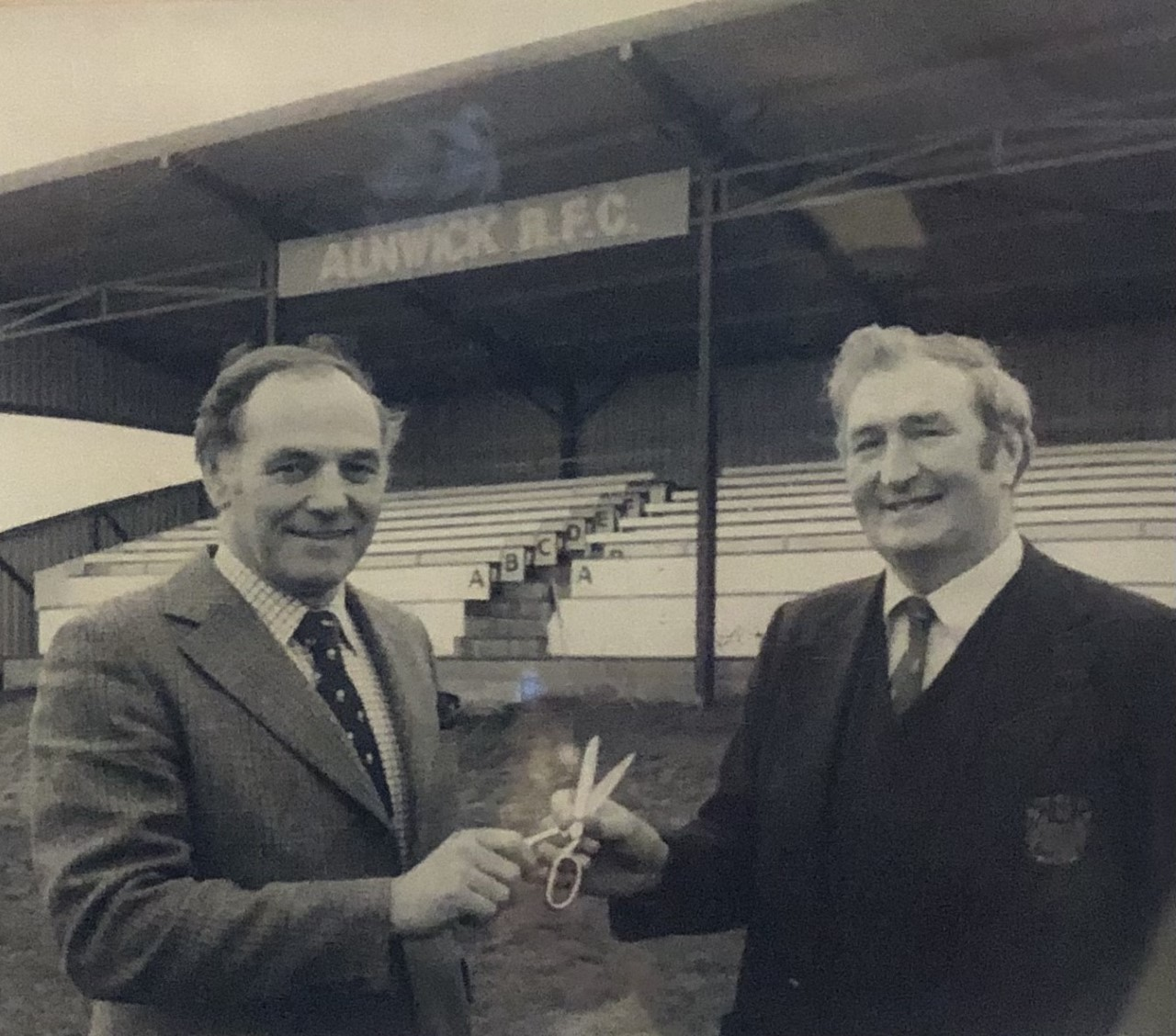
Opening of the grandstand. September 1984

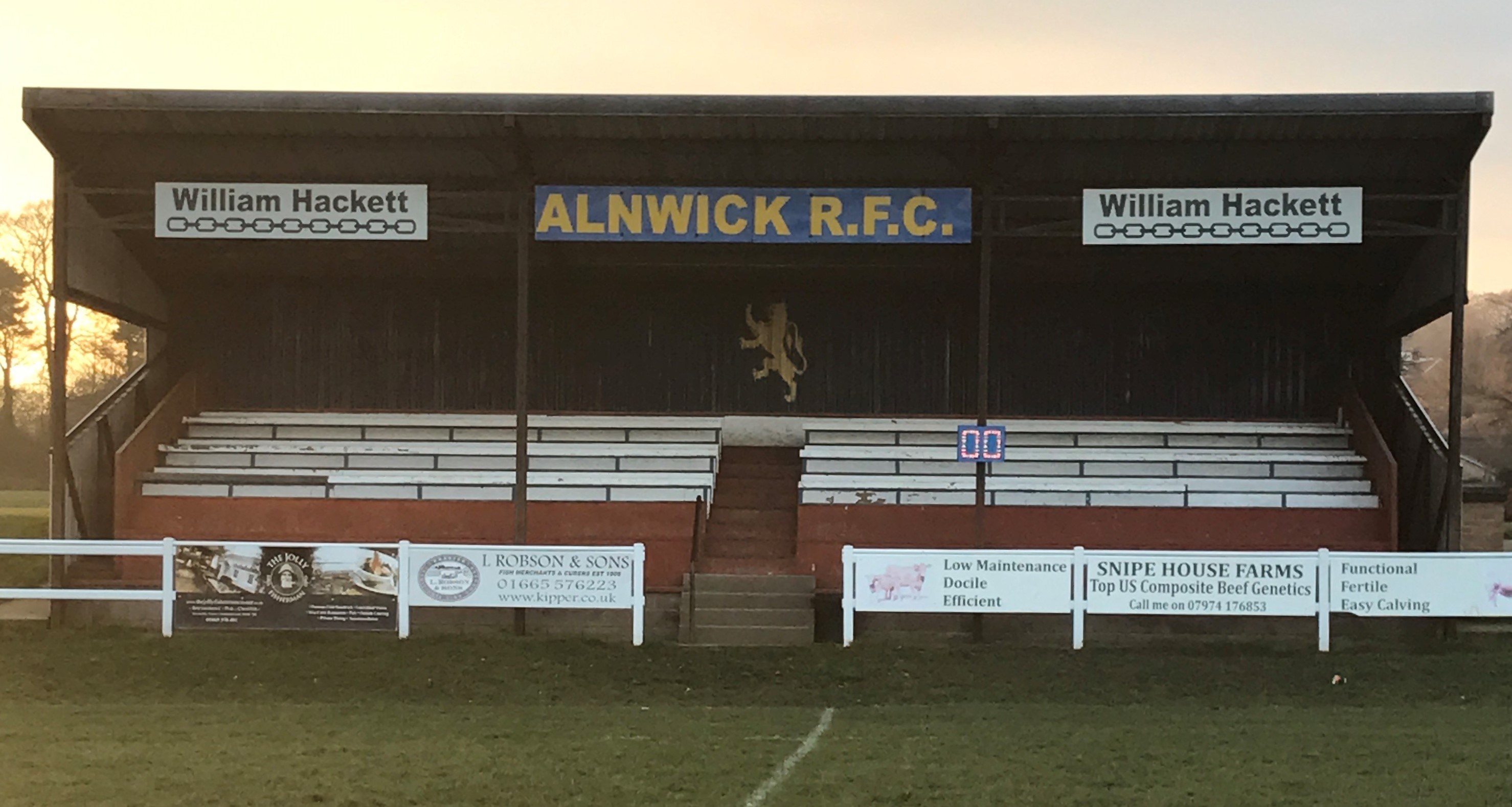
Grandstand overlooking the 1st XV pitch. January 2017

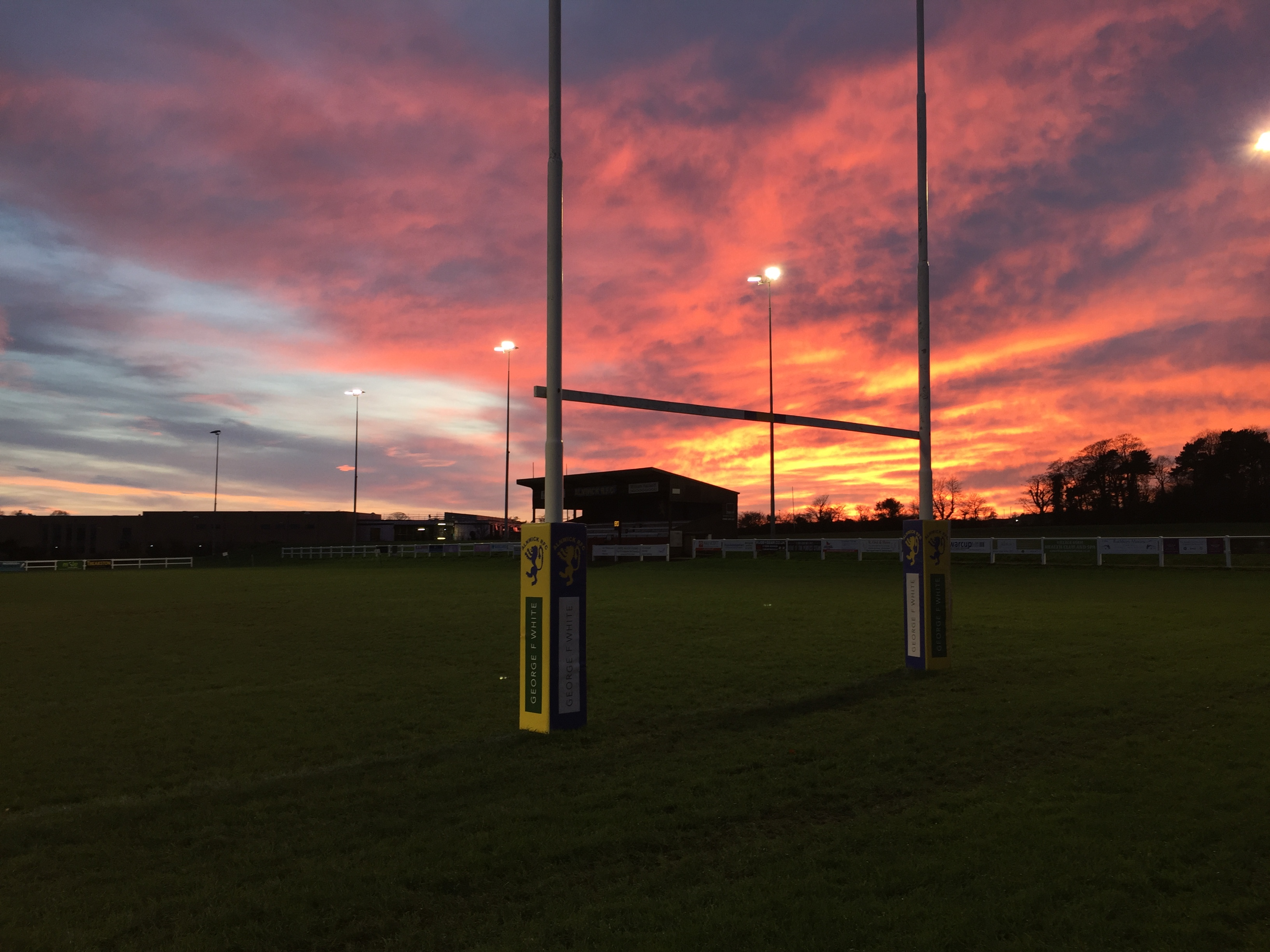
View of the 1st XV pitch from the clubhouse. December 2017

In 1961/62 the ground at Greensfield was drained, levelled and seeded. The club house was officially opened on 29 April 1964 by A.G.Butler, President of the Rugby Football Union. Greensfield has 3 Rugby pitches. The 1st team Pitch has a small grandstand on the touchline, the stand was opened in 1984. The 1st team pitch is floodlit, the first game under floodlights was a fixture against Northumberland County President's XV on Monday 29 October 1990. The clubhouse overlooks the dead-ball area behind the posts at the north eastern end of the pitch. Greensfield is often chosen by the Northumberland Rugby Football Union to host fixtures in the County Championship. Greensfield hosted the first home fixture Northumberland played after the closure of the Northumberland County Ground in 1988.

A major overhaul of facilities took place in 2012 resulting in new changing rooms being built along with a gym, improved toilets and showers, enhanced car parking, flood defense work and new advertising boards for the 1st team pitch. The project cost £240,000, which was made up from £130,000 in grants and a fundraising campaign which raised £110,000.

The new facilities were officially opened by Bob Reeves, president of the Rugby Football Union, on 19 October 2013 before the North One East clash: Alnwick 14 Wheatley Hills 8.

== Honours ==
- Northumberland Senior Cup (7): 1983/84, 2016/17, 2018/19, 2021/22, 2023/24, 2024/25, 2025/26
- Northumberland Senior Shield (1): 1964/65
- North 1 East (1): 2017/18
- Durham/Northumberland 1 (1): 2012/13
- Durham/Northumberland 1 v Yorkshire 1 promotion playoff winners: (1) 2003/04

== Notable former players ==
- (Scotland) Peter Walton
- (Scotland) Ally Hogg
- (England) Toby Flood
- (England) Andy Buist
- (England) Tom Penny

== See also ==
- English rugby union system
- Rugby union in England
