= 1978–79 Rugby Union County Championship =

English rugby union competition

1978–79 County Championship
- Countries: England
- Champions: Middlesex (7th title)
- Runners-up: Northumberland

The 1978–79 Rugby Union County Championship was the 79th edition of England's County Championship rugby union club competition.

Middlesex won their seventh title after defeating Northumberland in the final.

== First Round ==
| Pos | Northern Division | P | W | D | L | F | A | Pts |
|---|---|---|---|---|---|---|---|---|
| 1 | Northumberland | 5 | 4 | 0 | 1 | 90 | 37 | 8 |
| 2 | Lancashire | 5 | 4 | 0 | 1 | 96 | 41 | 8 |
| 3 | Yorkshire | 5 | 3 | 0 | 2 | 75 | 57 | 6 |
| 4 | Durham | 5 | 2 | 0 | 3 | 49 | 76 | 4 |
| 5 | Cumbria | 5 | 1 | 0 | 4 | 28 | 74 | 2 |
| 6 | Cheshire | 5 | 1 | 0 | 4 | 29 | 82 | 2 |

| Pos | Midlands East Division | P | W | D | L | F | A | Pts |
|---|---|---|---|---|---|---|---|---|
| 1 | Notts, Lincs & Derby | 2 | 2 | 0 | 0 | 33 | 17 | 4 |
| 2 | Leicestershire | 2 | 1 | 0 | 1 | 24 | 26 | 2 |
| 3 | East Midlands | 2 | 0 | 0 | 2 | 16 | 30 | 0 |

| Pos | Midlands West Division | P | W | D | L | F | A | Pts |
|---|---|---|---|---|---|---|---|---|
| 1 | Warwickshire | 2 | 2 | 0 | 0 | 50 | 6 | 4 |
| 2 | North Midlands | 2 | 1 | 0 | 1 | 17 | 20 | 2 |
| 3 | Staffordshire | 2 | 0 | 0 | 2 | 6 | 47 | 0 |

| Pos | London Group A | P | W | D | L | F | A | Pts |
|---|---|---|---|---|---|---|---|---|
| 1 | Middlesex | 2 | 2 | 0 | 0 | 48 | 9 | 4 |
| 2 | Kent | 2 | 1 | 0 | 1 | 18 | 10 | 2 |
| 3 | Eastern Counties | 2 | 0 | 0 | 2 | 10 | 57 | 0 |

| Pos | London Group B | P | W | D | L | F | A | Pts |
|---|---|---|---|---|---|---|---|---|
| 1 | Surrey | 3 | 3 | 0 | 0 | 84 | 27 | 6 |
| 2 | Sussex | 3 | 2 | 0 | 1 | 41 | 32 | 4 |
| 3 | Hertfordshire | 3 | 1 | 0 | 2 | 50 | 62 | 2 |
| 4 | Hampshire | 3 | 0 | 0 | 3 | 25 | 79 | 0 |

| Pos | South-West Division | P | W | D | L | F | A | Pts |
|---|---|---|---|---|---|---|---|---|
| 1 | Gloucestershire | 3 | 2 | 1 | 0 | 59 | 21 | 5 |
| 2 | Cornwall | 3 | 2 | 1 | 0 | 35 | 20 | 5 |
| 3 | Somerset | 3 | 1 | 0 | 2 | 20 | 63 | 2 |
| 4 | Devon | 3 | 0 | 0 | 3 | 25 | 35 | 0 |

| Pos | Southern Division | P | W | D | L | F | A | Pts |
|---|---|---|---|---|---|---|---|---|
| 1 | Oxfordshire | 3 | 3 | 0 | 0 | 87 | 39 | 6 |
| 2 | Buckinghamshire | 3 | 2 | 0 | 1 | 61 | 48 | 4 |
| 3 | Berkshire | 3 | 1 | 0 | 2 | 44 | 67 | 2 |
| 4 | Dorset & Wilts | 3 | 0 | 0 | 3 | 36 | 74 | 0 |

== Second Round ==
| Venue | Team One | Team Two | Score |
|---|---|---|---|
| Newark | Notts, Lincs & Derbys | Warwickshire | 19-12 |
| Richmond | Middlesex | Surrey | 38-30 |
| Cheltenham | Gloucestershire | Oxfordshire | 25-10 |

== Semi finals ==
| Date | Venue | Team One | Team Two | Score |
|---|---|---|---|---|
| 9 Dec | Gosforth | Northumberland | Notts, Lincs & Derbyshire | 19-6 |
| 9 Dec | Gloucester | Gloucestershire | Middlesex | 13-21 |

== Final ==
30 December 1978

| Middlesex | 19–6 | Northumberland |
| Try: Lambert, Hess; Con: Charles Ralston; Pen: Charles Ralston (3) | | Try: Patrick; Con: Young |

Twickenham
Referee: Laurie Prideaux (North Midlands)

| Charles Ralston | Rosslyn Park |
| Colin Lambert | Harlequins |
| Alan Friell | London Scottish |
| Rick Gordon | London Scottish |
| T Morrison | London New Zealand |
| T A Bryan | Northampton |
| Alan Lawson | London Scottish |
| Andy Ripley | Rosslyn Park |
| Adrian Alexander | Harlequins |
| M A H Hess | Richmond |
| Chris Ralston (capt) | Richmond |
| Bob Mordell | Rosslyn Park |
| Clint McGregor | Saracens |
| I Thomas | London Welsh |
| Les Barlow | Rosslyn Park |
Replacements:
| David Croydon | Saracens (for Gordon 39 mins) |

| Brian Patrick | Gosforth |
| Jim Pollock | Northern |
| Alan MacMillan | Morpeth |
| Alastair Tindle | Northern |
| Steve Gustard (capt) | Gosforth |
| Richard Breakey | Gosforth |
| Malcolm Young | Gosforth |
| Roger Uttley | Gosforth |
| Iain Richardson | Northern |
| G E Longstaff | Northern |
| Steve Bainbridge | Gosforth |
| P J Gordon | Morpeth |
| A D Johnson | Alnwick |
| John Blissett | Gosforth |
| L W Smith | Alnwick |
Replacements:
| I Pringle | Morpeth (for Longstaff HT) |

== See also ==
- English rugby union system
- Rugby union in England
