= 1897–98 Rugby Union County Championship =

English rugby union competition

1897–98 County Championship
- Countries: England
- Champions: Northumberland (1st title)
- Runners-up: Midland Counties

The 1897–98 Rugby Union County Championship was the tenth edition of England's premier rugby union club competition at the time.

Northumberland won the competition for the first time defeating Midland Counties in the final. The Midlands team was weakened by the refusal of Leicester to release their players for the county team.

== Final ==
26 March 1898

Midland Counties	3–24	Northumberland
Try: Gould		Try: Taylor, Stone (3), Bates, Stevenson; Con: Taylor (3), Anderson

Coventry
Referee: John Boswell (Scottish Union)

J F Byrne	Moseley
G Birtles	Blackheath
F A Byrne	Moseley
J A Gould	Moseley
William Bunting	Bromsgrove
Rev Richard Cattell	Moseley
F Cattell	Moseley
C P Evers	Moseley
B H Cattell	Moseley
Aubrey Dowson	Moseley
B J Ebsworth	Moseley
A St G Cumming	Wolverhampton
J Hall	Rugby
J J Robinson	Burton
D P Miller	Stratford-on-Avon

P Moran	Wallsend
G C Robinson	Percy Park
W Bates	Percy Park
F Stone	Percy Park
S Anderson	Wallsend
Ernest Taylor	Rockliff
S C Lockerby	Percy Park
Ronald Stevenson	Northern
R W Bell	Northern
G Gibson	Northern
Charles Gibson	Northern
J H Greenwell	Rockliff
F J Bell	Rockliff
W Dobinson	Rockliff
J Nesbit	Wallsend

== See also ==
- English rugby union system
- Rugby union in England
