= 1980–81 Rugby Union County Championship =

English rugby union competition

1980–81 Thorn EMI County Championship
- Countries: England
- Champions: Northumberland (2nd title)
- Runners-up: Gloucestershire

The 1980–81 Thorn EMI Rugby Union County Championship was the 81st edition of England's County Championship rugby union club competition.

Northumberland won their second title (but first since 1898) after defeating Gloucestershire in the final.

== First Round ==
Pos	Northern Division	P	W	D	L	F	A	Pts
1	Northumberland	5	5	0	0	99	44	10
2	Lancashire	5	4	0	1	107	31	8
3	Yorkshire	5	3	0	2	70	81	6
4	Durham	5	1	0	4	39	60	2
5	Cheshire	5	1	0	4	36	79	2
6	Cumberland & Westmorland	5	1	0	4	37	93	2

Pos	Midlands Group A	P	W	D	L	F	A	Pts
1	North Midlands	2	2	0	0	22	3	4
2	Staffordshire	2	1	0	1	9	10	2
3	East Midlands	2	0	0	2	6	24	0

Pos	Midlands Group B	P	W	D	L	F	A	Pts
1	Warwickshire	2	2	0	0	46	19	4
2	Leicestershire	2	1	0	1	33	39	2
3	Notts, Lincs & Derby	2	0	0	2	20	41	0

Pos	London Group A	P	W	D	L	F	A	Pts
1	Surrey	2	2	0	0	40	18	4
2	Middlesex	2	1	0	1	51	26	2
3	Eastern Counties	2	0	0	2	15	62	0

Pos	London Group B	P	W	D	L	F	A	Pts
1	Hertfordshire	3	3	0	0	55	17	6
2	Kent	3	2	0	1	73	38	4
3	Sussex	3	1	0	2	45	35	2
4	Hampshire	3	0	0	3	20	103	0

Pos	South-West Division	P	W	D	L	F	A	Pts
1	Gloucestershire	3	3	0	0	43	25	6
2	Cornwall	3	2	0	1	35	17	4
3	Devon	3	1	0	2	34	41	2
4	Somerset	3	0	0	3	22	51	0

Pos	Southern Division	P	W	D	L	F	A	Pts
1	Buckinghamshire	3	3	0	0	75	28	6
2	Oxfordshire	3	2	0	1	59	28	4
3	Berkshire	3	1	0	2	25	39	2
4	Dorset & Wilts	3	0	0	3	19	31	0

== Second Round ==
Venue	Team One	Team Two	Score
Coventry	Warwickshire	North Midlands	13-0
Old Deer Park	Surrey	Hertfordshire	14-12
Gloucester	Gloucestershire	Buckinghamshire	19-0

== Semi finals ==
Date	Venue	Team One	Team Two	Score
22 Nov	Bristol	Gloucestershire	Warwickshire	3-0
22 Nov	Gosforth	Northumberland	Surrey	12-6

== Final ==
31 January 1981

Gloucestershire	6–15	Northumberland
Pen: Butler (2)		Try: Roberts, Pollock; Con: Johnson, Young; Drop: Johnson

Kingsholm, Gloucester
Referee: Roger Quittenton (London)

15	Peter Butler	Gloucester
14	Lewis Dick	Cheltenham
13	Phil Cue	Bristol
12	Paul Taylor	Gloucester
11	Richard Mogg	Gloucester
10	Dave Sorrell	Bristol
9	Peter Kingston	Gloucester
8	Bob Hesford	Bristol
7	Paul Wood	Gloucester
6	Mike Rafter (capt)	Bristol
5	John Fidler	Gloucester
4	Nigel Pomphrey	Bristol
3	Austin Sheppard	Bristol
2	Kevin Bogira	Bristol
1	Gordon Sargent	Gloucester
Replacements:
16	John Carr	Bristol University
17	Paul Howell	Gloucester
18	Steve Baker	Gloucester
19	Kevin White	Gloucester
20	Phil Blakeway	Gloucester
21	Steve Boyle	Gloucester

15	Brian Patrick	Gosforth
14	Jim Pollock	Northern
13	Alastair Tindle	Northern
12	Richard Breakey	Gosforth
11	Steve Gustard (capt)	Gosforth
10	David Johnson	Gosforth
9	Malcolm Young	Gosforth
8	Giles Smallwood	Northern
7	Bob Anderson	Gosforth
6	Iain Richardson	Gosforth
5	Steve Bainbridge	Gosforth
4	Terry Roberts	Gosforth
3	Jeff Bell	Gosforth
2	Bob Cunningham	Gosforth
1	Colin White	Gosforth
Replacements:
16	W Telford	Alnwick
17	T Bell	Alnwick
18	I Pringle	Morpeth
19	Ian Ramage	Gosforth
20	P Holden	Northern
21	C Dixon	Tynedale

== See also ==
- English rugby union system
- Rugby union in England
