= Borders Competitions =

Border Region: Schools & Youth Competitions
- Countries: Scotland and England
- Date: September – December 2015

The Border Region: Schools & Youth Competitions structures established for the 2015–16 season group schools and clubs based on the development structures they have in place, the volume of teams they operate and results over recent seasons. The fixture programmes arranged by Scottish Rugby will guarantee blocks of 'school v school' or 'club v club' fixtures in the autumn phase of the season

== History ==
In December 2013 Scottish Rugby launched its strategic initiative ‘Youth Rugby – A Strategy for Schools’. Former Scotland rugby coach Frank Hadden conducted the review for Scottish Rugby.

"In recent years youth rugby has had many changes in competition structure mainly based on the needs and wants of participating teams, some teams have thrived, some teams have struggled but change has been a constant and it is obvious that the current structure continues to be affected by; withdrawal of teams from leagues, weather, lack of competitive fixtures for some teams, a disjointed approach to fixturing, a reluctance by some to play on a regular basis. There is no doubt that the structure for youth rugby has reached a point where a radical change in approach is required to bring stability to our game."

== Format ==
U18 Border Semi Junior League - Clubs

U16 Border U16 League - Clubs

S3 (U15) - Schools

S2 (U14) - Schools

S1 (U13) - Schools

== Leagues ==
=== Border Semi-Junior League ===
Fixtures, results and tables for the Border Semi-Junior League

- Two teams are based in Northumberland, England - Berwick Colts and Tynedale RFC

2015 Border Semi-Junior League
Team	Location
Berwick Colts	Berwick-upon-Tweed, Northumberland
Duns Colts	Duns
Gala Wanderers	Galashiels
Hawick Wanderers	Hawick
Hawick PSA	Hawick
Jed Thistle	Jedburgh
Kelso Harlequins	Kelso
Melrose Wasps	Melrose
Peebles Colts	Peebles
Selkirk YC	Selkirk
Tynedale Colts	Corbridge, Northumberland

Border Semi Junior League Winners Table
Year	Team
2014/15	Jed Thistle
2013/14	Jed Thistle
2012/13	Gala Wanderers
2011/12	Selkirk YC
2010/11	Tynedale Colts
2009/10	Selkirk YC
2008/09	Hawick Wanderers

Borders Competitions (Scottish Borders)

=== Border U16 League ===
Fixtures, results and tables for the Border U16 League

- One club is based in Northumberland, England - Berwick RFC. The club are affiliated to both the Scottish Rugby Union and the English Rugby Football Union.

2015 Border U16 League
Team	Location
Berwick RFC	Berwick-upon-Tweed, Northumberland
Duns RFC	Duns
Gala Red Triangle	Galashiels
Hawick Albion	Hawick
Kelso RFC	Kelso
Melrose RFC	Melrose
Peebles RFC	Peebles
Selkirk RFC	Selkirk

Borders Competitions (Scottish Borders)
