= Northumberland Senior Plate (rugby union) =

Northumberland Senior Cup
- Sport: Rugby Union
- Instituted: 2002; 24 years ago
- Number of teams: 8
- Country: England
- Holders: Novocastrians (3rd title) (2025-26)
- Most titles: Ponteland (4 titles)
- Website: Northumberland RFU

The Northumberland Senior Plate is an annual rugby union competition held among the clubs of the Northumberland RFU. It was first played during the 2001–2002 season and serves as the second tier county cup for the Northumberland Rugby Union, which encompasses Newcastle upon Tyne, North Tyneside, and Northumberland.

The plate was originally introduced in 2001-2002 for the first round losers in the Northumberland Senior Cup, as it became clear that some clubs would not reach the latter stages of the Cup. Since then, the competition has undergone various changes. From the mid-2000s until COVID-19 the competition was open to the 9th to 16th best-placed clubs in the league pyramid. From 2021 to 2025 the competition only allowed clubs from Level 7 and 8 as well as some 2nd XVs. Tynedale II became the first 2nd XV to win the competition in 2025. From the beginning of the 2025–26 season the competition reverted, partly, to its original conception. Losers in the Northumberland Senior Cup 1st Round dropped into the Senior Plate 1st Round along with Clubs placed 9th and below in the league pyramid.

The current holders are Novocastrians who defeated Percy Park 42-24, in the 2026 cup final. All Senior Plate Finals have been held at various venues in the county and takes place on Easter Saturday.

The Senior Plate is currently the second most important county cup competition for club sides based in Northumberland and Tyne and Wear typically competing at tier 7 (Durham/Northumberland 1), tier 8 (Durham/Northumberland 2) and tier 9 (Durham/Northumberland 3) of the English rugby union system. The format is a knock-out cup with a quarter-final, semi-final and final, which is played at a neutral ground in April.

== Northumberland Senior Plate Winners ==
Year	Winners	Score	Runners Up
2002	Ashington	37–23	North Shields
2003	Berwick	36–19	Ashington
2004	Ponteland	22–8	Wallsend
2005	Gosforth	18–7	North Shields
2006	Ashington	23–18	Wallsend
2007	Wallsend	18–17	Gosforth
2008	Ashington	28–27	Northumbria University
2009	Northumbria University	46–5	Ponteland
2010–2011	No Competition played		
2012	Medicals	27–19	Rockcliff
2013	Northumbria University	78–17	Novocastrians
2014	Blyth	37–31	Berwick
2015	Ponteland	32–23	Novocastrians
2016	Novocastrians	41–3	Ponteland
2017	Ponteland	21–18	Rockcliff
2018	Novocastrians	33–30	North Shields
2019	North Shields	24–23	Ponteland
2020–2021	No Competition due to COVID-19 pandemic in the United Kingdom		
2022	Medicals	32–26	Alnwick II
2023	Rockcliff	28–18	Novocastrians
2024	Ponteland	W/O*	Novocastrians
2025	Tynedale II	28–17	Medicals
2026	Novocastrians	42-24	Percy Park

== By number of wins (clubs) ==
Team	Wins	Years
Ponteland	4	2004, 2015, 2017, 2024
Ashington	3	2002, 2006, 2008
Novocastrians	3	2016, 2018, 2026
Medicals	2	2012, 2022
Northumbria University	2	2009, 2013
Berwick	1	2003
Blyth	1	2014
Gosforth	1	2005
North Shields	1	2019
Tynedale II	1	2025
Rockcliff	1	2023
Wallsend	1	2007

== Notes ==
- The 2024 cup final was not played and both clubs could not agree a date. After much debate Northumberland RFU awarded the title to Ponteland.
