= Wallsend RUFC =

English rugby union club, based in Wallsend, Tyneside

(England) Wallsend RFC
- Full name: Wallsend Rugby Club
- Union: Northumberland RFU
- Founded: 1881; 145 years ago
- Location: Wallsend, Tyne and Wear, England
- Ground: St. Peters Field
- League: Durham/Northumberland 3
- 2019–20: 3rd

Official website
- www.wallsendrugbyclub.co.uk

Wallsend Rugby Football Club is a rugby union side based in Wallsend, Tyne and Wear. The club runs senior adult and junior teams for all ages. The 1st XV senior side compete in Counties 3 Durham & Northumberland and the 2nd XV play in the Northumberland Rugby Union River Coquet league. Senior games are played on Saturday afternoons. The junior boys and girls teams train and play on Sunday mornings with ages 4+ catered for.

Senior training takes place at St Peters Playing Field, St Peters Road, Wallsend, NE28 7JN on Tuesday and Thursday evenings from 6.45pm. Junior training takes place at St Peters Playing Field, St Peters Road, Wallsend, NE28 7JN on Thursday evenings from 6pm and Sunday mornings from 9.45am.

== Notable players ==
- Stan Anderson, one Test match for England in the 1899 Home Nations Championship.
- Micky Ward, one of Wallsend's most successful players and former Newcastle Falcons and England Saxons player. Ward was born and raised in Wallsend, having attended Burnside Community High School. He is now Director of Rugby at Blaydon RFC and forwards coach at Newcastle Falcons.

== History ==
The earliest reference in the club's archives is a typewritten A5 sheet referring to the 1st A.G.M. of Wallsend R.F.C. at the Coach and Horses on 10 May 1881.

Early Wallsend fixture lists in the club's possession are: 1889-90 which includes games against Percy Park II's, Rockcliffe IIs and Tynedale IIs. 1890-91. Opponents include Consett, Gosforth, Percy Park and Tynedale firsts. The club also won the County No3 competition. 1897-98. Matches versus Percy Park Ists, Carlisle, Westoe, West Hartlepool, Tynedale, Durham City, Rockcliffe and Northern, (who were beaten 45-0 at home and 18-0 away).

In 1899 and 1900 Wallsend won the County No2 competition.

Another fixture list is 1933-34 including Ashington, Consett, Tynedale, Swan's (relevant later), Blaydon, Westoe and North Durham, although at what level isn't evident.

The Club seems to have led a nomadic existence in the 1920s and 1930s, with no permanent home. There are conflicting records from the Club's late "Old Boys". From 1926 to 1929 the Club's home was the "Boundary Ground", this being the terminal point of the tram service from Newcastle. In the early 1930s the Club were at either Stott's Farm (adjoining Swan Hunter's Recreation Ground) or "Sanderson's Farm" at Daisy Hill. Mid to late 1930s found the Club at "Dene Park" Battle Hill (which may have been Bowran's Farm). During the Second World War all the Club's fixtures were played away at local Armed Services bases. The war brought the loss of seven players killed in action.

A great revival took place after 1945 due to the generosity of Farmer Day and his sons Peter & Tom. "Day's Farm" at Willington Square was home ground for a further nine seasons until old members hung up their boots and interest was lost locally. One of the Club's correspondents from those days states that from 1954 to 1959 Wallsend combined with Swan Hunters under the name of "Wallsend", but this is doubtful as the Club have a copy of a card originally headed "Wallsend RFC" and annotated & altered to "Swan Hunters RFC" — this is dated 1954 & signed by Alf Yeoman – known to be a stalwart of Swan Hunter's Club. The connection with Swan Hunters was carried on until recent times of course, but the Club has records from the Company's magazine "The Shipyard" with references to matches against Wallsend in 1935, 1937 & 1938, when Swan's teams were still "cutting their teeth".

The Wallsend Club of today came about due to the Swan Hunter Recreation Ground being given up during the great amalgamation of Swan's, Vicker's, Hawthorn Leslie's and Readhead's into "British Shipbuilders". Fortunately, the sports centre at Bigge's Maine had been opened and the Club were invited to move "lock, stock & goalposts" providing it changed its name to "Wallsend RFC" and its colours to Green & Gold. So the Club left behind "the Hut" and the communal concrete bath for its new home in 1969. The metamorphosis from "Swan's in blue" to "Eagles in green" was not easy. The Club had been its own masters with virtually no outside interference, but at the sports centre it was just another section and difficulties arose with regard to changing room availability and pitch condition control; plus the fact that the Club no longer had its own income, but now had fees and charges imposed upon it.

With regard to playing, those were the days before leagues were formed, all fixtures apart from cup competitions were arranged on a "friendly" basis. The Club found that, despite its asking the "senior" clubs in the County for 1st XV games, most would only grant 2nd or 3rd team fixtures. Wallsend, it seemed, had few "friends" at its own level.

The club won the Northumberland Junior Shield in 1975 with a 17-13 victory over the Gosforth Falcons at the County Ground. Players in the match included Jim Wrightson, Doug Pearson and Brian Thirlaway. Thirlaway produced the longest drop-goal in the Club's memory from near the halfway line.

In 1983 Wallsend won the County Junior Cup (No3 Competition). That team, "Lowery's Men", included Jim Wrightson, Stu Robinson, Alan Flockton and the Robison brothers Gavin & Stu (L.F.P.). Also in 1983, the Club's long-serving County Representative Dennis Douglas was appointed President of Northumberland Rugby Union, an honour not previously attained by any Wallsend member. By 1991 life at the Sports Centre had become untenable and the Club moved over the hedge to Benfield School, where the "clubhouse" was Sam Smith's Pavilion, under the auspices of Benfield Residents' Association. The move brought about an almost immediate success in the Club's 3rd Team, "Wallsend Eagles" being victorious in the final of the County Junior Plate Competition.

With the advent of Leagues in 1987, the Club began at last to prove its worth on the field in an officially recognised way. The Club's efforts came to fruition with its winning the County Senior Plate in 2007 against Gosforth and promotion as Champions of Durham & Northumberland Division 2, holding its own in the first season at the higher level, culminating in beating Northern at McCracken Park for the first time since 1897-98. Once again though the Club began to have trouble with financial matters and availability of pitches, so once again sought playing and changing facilities elsewhere.

To the Club's rescue came Beacon Hill School, who offered a pitch along with a new small block of changing rooms. On the social side of things (essential for any rugby club) the Club were made welcome at "The Barking Dog", a long established sports set-up catering mainly for football and whippets – hence the name.

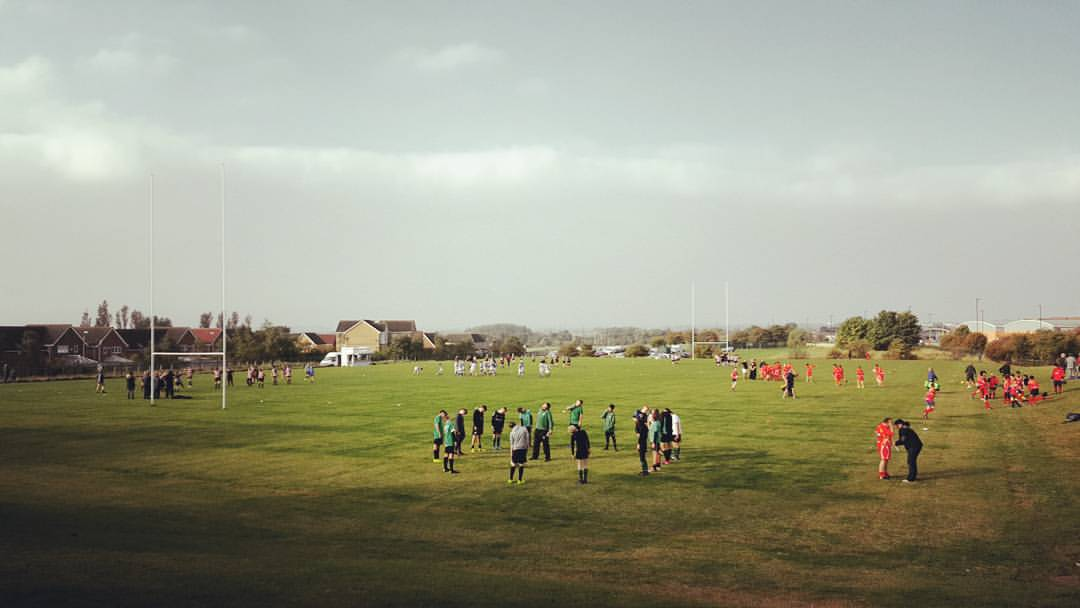

A major step towards attaining the Club's own ground took place on Wednesday 31 July 2013, when the first turf was ceremoniously cut at Battle Hill Playing Fields at the top of St. Peter's Road. That was to signal the start of levelling the playing area and installing drainage, which proceeded over the autumn and winter, then continued into the early months of 2014. Since then, the area has been completely fenced off, with gates at strategic positions for ball recovery. The principal entry for vehicles is on Caesar Way, this being the first exit from the small roundabout at the top of St. Peter's Road.

For the time being the Club's Junior sides will play on a Sunday on the new pitch – but the Club's Senior Fifteen played a special friendly fixture against a Northern RFC side to officially open the new pitches on Saturday 20 December 2014, during which, at half time, mince pies and port wine were served to players, match officials and spectators.

The Club's aim is to have a genuine home of Rugby in Wallsend under its control. Development of the new site continues with car parking facilities planned for the near future and bricks & mortar, the Club's own clubhouse, as its long term aspirations.

== Club Honours ==
- Northumberland Senior Cup Runners Up: 1899
- Durham/Northumberland 3 Champions: 1998–99, 2021-22
- Durham/Northumberland 2 Champions: 2006–07
- Northumberland Senior Plate Champions: 2007
- Papa John's Counties 3 community cup Winners: 2024

== Rugby World Cup 2015 ==
Club President, Jimmy Wrightson, wrote and performed a song, along with juniors from the club, to celebrate the Rugby World Cup.
