= Northumberland Senior Cup (rugby union) =

- Sport: Rugby Union
- Instituted: 1882; 144 years ago
- Number of teams: 8
- Country: England
- Holders: Alnwick RFC (7th title) (2025-26)
- Most titles: Gosforth (Newcastle Falcons) (30 titles)
- Website: Northumberland RFU

The Northumberland Senior Cup is an annual rugby union competition held between the clubs of the Northumberland RFU which was first played in 1882. It is the senior county cup for the Northumberland Rugby Union, which includes Newcastle upon Tyne, North Tyneside, and Northumberland. The current holders are Alnwick who defeated Northern 29-0 in the 2026 cup final. All finals were held at the Northumberland County Ground from 1912 up until 1988; before and after the County Ground's existence Senior Cup Finals have been played at various venues in the county.

The Senior Cup is currently the premier county cup competition for club sides affiliated to the Northumberland Rugby Football Union typically based at level 5 (North Premier) and level 6 (North 1 East) of the English rugby union system, although the 2nd XV of Tynedale (who play in level 4 National League 2 North), Berwick (who play in the Scottish Regional League) and the two university's in Newcastle (who play in the BUCS) have taken part in the competition. The format is as a knock-out cup with a quarter-final, semi-final and final, which is to be played at a neutral ground in April on Easter Saturday.

== Past winners ==
Year	Winners	Score	Runners Up
1882	Northern	5-0	Northumberland Club ±
1883	Tynemouth ±	2-0	Tynedale
1884	Northern	1-0	Tynedale
1885	Tynemouth ±	6-3	Northern
1886	Percy Park	4-3	North Elswick ±
1887	Tynedale	4-1	Northern
1888	Northern	7-0	Percy Park
1889	Northern	7-0	Percy Park
1890	Rockcliff	10-0	North Elswick ±
1891	Northern	18-0	Gosforth
1892	Rockcliff	13-0	Percy Park
1893	Rockcliff	13-3	Percy Park
1894	Rockcliff	0-0	Percy Park
1894 (R)	Rockcliff	29-3	Percy Park
1895	Rockcliff	28-5	Brighton ±
1896	Rockcliff	10-0	Percy Park
1897	Percy Park	6-3	Rockcliff
1898	Rockcliff	5-3	Percy Park
1899	Percy Park	19-0	Wallsend
1900	Rockcliff	8-5	Percy Park
1901	Rockcliff	13-0	Northern
1902	Rockcliff	9-0	Percy Park
1903	Northern	6-4	Percy Park
1904	Northern	8-0	Rockcliff
1905	Rockcliff	10-0	Percy Park
1906	Tynedale	11-3	Percy Park
1907	Percy Park	6-3	Tynedale
1908	Percy Park	23-0	Tynedale
1909	Rockcliff	0-0	Northern
1909 (R)	Rockcliff	22-3	Northern
1910	Percy Park	3-0	Northern
1911	Tynedale	7-6	Percy Park
1912	Northern	12-10	Percy Park
1913	Percy Park	19-3	Old Novocastrians
1914	Tynedale	0-0	Percy Park
1914 (R)	Tynedale	9-3	Percy Park
1915-19	Competition suspended for World War I		
1920	Rockcliff	9-0	Northern
1921	Percy Park	10-0	Medicals
1922	Medicals	30-0	Northern
1923	Medicals	12-3	Northern
1924	Percy Park	4-3	Northern
1925	Seghill	0-0	Medicals
1926	Northern	3-0	Rockcliff
1927	Tynedale	5-3	Northern
1928	Gosforth	5-3	Percy Park
1929	Seghill	5-5	Percy Park
1929 (R)	Seghill	4-3	Percy Park
1930	Seghill	15-11	Percy Park
1931	Northern	11-3	Armstrong College
1932	Seghill	19-8	Gosforth
1933	Tynedale	17-0	Old Novocastrians
1934	Tynedale	3-3	Old Novocastrians
1934 (R)	Tynedale	9-6	Old Novocastrians
1935	Tynedale	13-11	Northern
1936	Tynedale	23-21	Gosforth
1937	Northern	21-4	Percy Park
1938	Percy Park	9-3	Old Novocastrians
1939	Percy Park	8-3	Northern
1940-46	Competition suspended for World War II		
1947	Percy Park	13-0	Medicals
1948	Tynedale	15-13	Northern
1949	Percy Park	10-3	Medicals
1950	Percy Park	9-3	Gosforth
1951	Percy Park	9-0	Gosforth
1952	Medicals	5-3	Northern
1953	Medicals	14-0	Percy Park
1954	Percy Park	6-0	Medicals
1955	Northern	11-5	Percy Park
1956	Gosforth	3-3	Northern
1956 (R)	Gosforth	6-3	Northern
1957	Percy Park	9-3	Gosforth
1958	Percy Park	9-3	Morpeth
1959	Northern	11-3	Percy Park
1960	Gosforth	22-6	King's College
1961	Northern	17-6	Gosforth
1962	Gosforth	3-3	Northern
1962 (R)	Gosforth	6-3	Northern
1963	Gosforth	16-0	Morpeth
1964	Gosforth	3-3	Northern
1964 (R)	Gosforth	9-3	Northern
1965	Newcastle University	12-3	Rockcliff
1966	Gosforth	17-6	Morpeth
1967	Gosforth	10-6	Northern
1968	Gosforth	46-0	Seghill
1969	Gosforth	18-3	Percy Park
1970	Northern	3-0	Gosforth
1971	Gosforth	19-6	Tynedale
1972	Gosforth	22-6	Northern
1973	Gosforth	21-9	Alnwick
1974	Gosforth	25-3	Morpeth
1975	Gosforth	22-3	Tynedale
1976	Gosforth	36-0	Northern
1977	Gosforth	37-0	Morpeth
1978	Gosforth	38-3	Alnwick
1979	Gosforth	9-3	Northern
1980	Gosforth	21-9	Alnwick
1981	Gosforth	19-0	Morpeth
1982	Gosforth	32-6	Morpeth
1983	Gosforth	24-6	Alnwick
1984	Alnwick	6-4	Gosforth
1985	Gosforth	17-12	Tynedale
1986	Gosforth	9-7	Tynedale
1987	Gosforth	18-9	Tynedale
1988	Tynedale	13-6	Gosforth
1989	Northern	24-16	Tynedale
1990	Gosforth	16-3	Northern
1991	Newcastle Gosforth	6-3	Tynedale
1992	Tynedale	15-3	Novocastrians
1993	Tynedale	6-6 (AET) Trophy Shared	Newcastle Gosforth
1994	Newcastle Gosforth	14-8	Tynedale
1995	Northern	6-3	Tynedale
1996	Tynedale	22-12	Berwick
1997	Berwick	51-3	Northern
1998	Morpeth	21-13	Tynedale
1999	Tynedale	24-10	Alnwick
2000	Tynedale	33-10	Morpeth
2001	Not Completed due to Foot and Mouth Outbreak		
2002	Morpeth	35-16	Northern
2003	Tynedale	7-6	Morpeth
2004	Tynedale	20-6	Morpeth
2005	Tynedale	41-13	Berwick
2006	Tynedale	64-8	Percy Park
2007	Morpeth	39-13	Tynedale
2008	Tynedale	40-7	Morpeth
2009	Tynedale	74-3	Gosforth
2010	Tynedale	24-9	Morpeth
2011	Percy Park	31-25	Tynedale
2012	Percy Park	12-6	Tynedale
2013	Percy Park	25-11	Morpeth
2014	Tynedale	32-0	Morpeth
2015	Northumbria University	25-13	Percy Park
2016	Morpeth	21-3	Percy Park
2017	Alnwick	11-7	Morpeth
2018	Percy Park	21-16	Alnwick
2019	Alnwick	39-3	Morpeth
2020	Morpeth	11-10	Alnwick
2021	No Competition due to COVID-19 pandemic in the United Kingdom		
2022	Alnwick	61-14	Novocastrians
2023	Northern	47-19	Tynedale
2024	Alnwick	31-8	Northern
2025	Alnwick	28-23	Northern
2026	Alnwick	29-0	Northern

- ± Denotes club now defunct

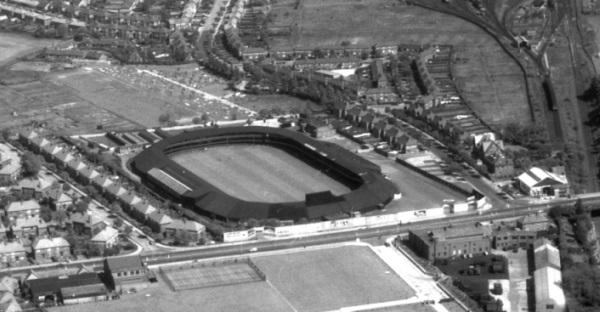
Northumberland County Ground in 1965

== By number of wins (clubs) ==
Team	Wins (outright wins/shared titles)	Years (* title was shared)
Gosforth (Newcastle Falcons)	30 (29/1)	1928, 1956, 1960, 1962, 1963, 1964, 1966, 1967, 1968, 1969, 1971, 1972, 1973, 1974, 1975, 1976, 1977, 1978, 1979, 1980, 1981, 1982, 1983, 1985, 1986, 1987, 1990, 1991, 1993*, 1994
Tynedale	24 (23/1)	1887, 1906, 1911, 1914, 1927, 1933, 1934, 1935, 1936, 1948, 1988, 1992, 1993*, 1996, 1999, 2000, 2003, 2004, 2005, 2006, 2008, 2009, 2010, 2014
Percy Park	22	1886, 1897, 1899, 1907, 1908, 1910, 1913, 1921, 1924, 1938, 1939, 1947, 1949, 1950, 1951, 1954, 1957, 1958, 2011, 2012, 2013, 2018
Northern	18	1882, 1884, 1888, 1889, 1891, 1903, 1904, 1912, 1926, 1931, 1937, 1955, 1959, 1961, 1970, 1989, 1995, 2023
Rockcliff	13	1890, 1892, 1893, 1894, 1895, 1896, 1898, 1900, 1901, 1902, 1905, 1909, 1920
Alnwick	7	1984, 2017, 2019, 2022, 2024, 2025, 2026
Morpeth	5	1998, 2002, 2007, 2016, 2020
Medicals	4	1922, 1923, 1952, 1953
Seghill	4	1925, 1929, 1930, 1932
Tynemouth	2	1883, 1885
Berwick	1	1997
Newcastle University	1	1965
Northumbria University	1	2015

== Northumberland Senior Plate ==
With the advent of professionalism, the gap between some clubs became too great in the county. In the 2001-2002 season the Northumberland Senior Plate was inaugurated as a competition for clubs knocked out of the first round of the Northumberland Senior Cup. Since then the competition has undergone various changes. The Plate is now competed for by all clubs, who are not in the top eight of Northumberland clubs, every season.

== See also ==
- Northumberland RFU
- English rugby union system
- Rugby union in England
