= Morpeth RFC =

English rugby union club

Morpeth
- Full name: Morpeth Rugby Football Club
- Union: Northumberland Rugby Football Union
- Founded: 1947; 79 years ago
- Location: Morpeth, Northumberland, England
- Ground: Grange House Field (Capacity: 1,000)
- Chairman: Simon Harries
- President: Duncan Hutton
- Captain: Jack Elliott
- League: Regional 2 North
- 2025–26: 8th

Official website
- morpethrfc.rfu.club

Morpeth Rugby Football Club is an English rugby union club based in Morpeth, Northumberland. The 1st XV team currently play in Regional 2 North, having previously reached the national levels of the sport for the first time in 2019–20. The club operates three senior men's sides and colts regularly playing each weekend, plus 'Morpeth Ranters' Vets, a senior ladies team and three girls rugby squads, as well as a full range of age grade rugby with teams ranging from under-6 to under-16.

== History ==
Morpeth RFC were founded in 1947. The club was originally formed as The Old Edwardians RFC on 28 June 1947 as a junior member of Northumberland RFU. However, on 5 May 1950 it was renamed Morpeth Old Edwardians, to differentiate from another Club with the same name in Birmingham. The early years of the club were relatively low-key but on 14 May 1954 it achieved senior playing status in Northumberland, then in 1958 they reached the final of the Northumberland Senior Cup for the very first time, losing 3–9 to Percy Park in a tight game. The club was finally renamed Morpeth Rugby Football Club on 20 June 1970. They would reach 4 more county cup finals during the 1960s and 1970s but would come up short in each, although the 1974 defeat against Gosforth would set them up for one of the all-time great national cup runs. This occurred during the 1974–75 John Player Cup, when a remarkable sequence of giant-killing victories took Morpeth to within 80 minutes of the John Player Cup final at Twickenham Stadium. In the qualifying round, Morpeth defeated Netherall Old Boys. In the first round, Morpeth beat Stockswood Park 10–0 at Mitford Road. In the second round, Morpeth defeated London Irish 19-3 again at Mitford road. In the quarter-final Morpeth, beat Bath 9–13 at the Recreation Ground. In the semi-final, Morpeth finally lost at home against Rosslyn Park 6-28. In 1998, after 7 previous finals without a win, Morpeth finally won the Northumberland Senior Cup, defeating Tynedale 21–13, on what was the 50th anniversary of the club.

Morpeth's league rugby started in North East 1, and in September 1987 travelled to Rotherham in their first ever League game and won 9-7. Rotherham went on to play in the Premiership in 2000. In the 1996–97 season Morpeth won the League and were promoted to North 2. In the 2000–01 season they were placed into North 1 East after the Leagues were split East & West, where they stayed until they suffered relegation at the end of the 2013–14 season. Their stay in Durham/Northumberland 1 was a short one, as although they finished second in the league to Guisborough, they defeated Yorkshire 1 runners up Malton & Norton 14–11 at home to clinch promotion back to North 1 East. At the end of the 2018–19 season Morpeth finished as champions of North 1 East, reaching North Premier, which at level 5 is the highest level the club have reached since the leagues began back in 1987. The 2019–20 season was cut short due to the COVID-19 pandemic and Morpeth were relegated, back to North 1 East, when a % points system for games played was brought in with 4 League matches still left to play.

Toby Flood (future England International) played 8 games & scored 83 points for Morpeth at the start of his rugby career in 2003–04 season. He played his last game for Morpeth v Hull on 22nd Nov 2003, the same day England beat Australia to win the 2003 Rugby World Cup!

== Ground ==
Morpeth RFC play at Grange House Field on Mitford Road, situated next to Newminster Middle School in the north-west of Morpeth, adjacent to the River Wansbeck. The ground consists of a clubhouse and 3 grass pitches (1 floodlit). The club-house has two function rooms, both equipped with bars, capable of hosting up to 250 people altogether. Capacity around the main pitch is approximately 1,000, all of which is standing. There is parking available at the ground, and Morpeth railway station is just over 1 mile walk away.

As well as hosting club games, the ground has also been used by Northumberland for the County Championships.

== Honours ==
- Northumberland Senior Cup winners (5): 1998, 2002, 2007, 2016, 2020
- North 1 East champions: 2018-19
- North East 1 champions: 1996–97
- Durham/Northumberland 1 promotion play-off winners: 2014–15
