= Stan Anderson (rugby union) =

English rugby union player and cricketer

- Born: Stanley Watson Anderson; 5 August 1871 Walker, Northumberland, England
- Died: 12 February 1942 (aged 70) Alnwick, Northumberland, England
- Occupation(s): Shipyard plater; publican

Rugby union career
- Position: Winger
Amateur team(s)
Years	Team	Apps	(Points)
- Northumberland
–	Wallsend		
–	Rockcliff		
International career
Years	Team	Apps	(Points)
1899	England	1	(0)

Stanley Watson Anderson (5 August 1871 – 12 February 1942) was an English international rugby union player.

Anderson was born in the Newcastle upon Tyne suburb of Walker in August 1871. He played rugby union at amateur level for Northumberland, Wallsend and Rockcliff. He was selected to play one Test match for England against Ireland at Lansdowne Road in the 1899 Home Nations Championship. Anderson also played cricket at minor counties level for Northumberland, making 25 appearances in the Minor Counties Championship between 1904–1913. By profession he was a shipyard plater and later ran the Plough Inn public house at Alnwick from 1919. He died at Alnwick in February 1942.
