= Tom Penny (rugby union) =

English rugby union player

- Born: Thomas Oscar Penny; 13 October 1994 (age 32) Newcastle upon Tyne, England
- Height: 1.78 m (5 ft 10 in)
- Weight: 92 kg (14 st 7 lb)
- School: Royal Grammar School, Newcastle upon Tyne

Rugby union career
- Position: Outside Centre/Wing/Fullback
- Current team: Newcastle Falcons
Amateur team(s)
Years	Team	Apps	(Points)
- Alnwick RFC
- Correct as of 19 October 2020
Senior career
Years	Team	Apps	(Points)
2013–2019	Newcastle Falcons	35	(22)
2019–2020	Harlequins	6	(0)
2020–	Newcastle Falcons	5	(5)
- Correct as of 19 October 2020
International career
Years	Team	Apps	(Points)
2012	England U18s		
- Correct as of 19 October 2020

Tom Penny (born 13 October 1994) is an English rugby union player who plays for Newcastle Falcons in the Premiership Rugby.

Penny started playing rugby aged four at Alnwick, a club he represented up to the age of 16 along with his school rugby at RGS Newcastle. He joined the Falcons' junior academy at the age of 11, also playing for England Under-18s at international level.

He made his first team debut for Newcastle in the 2013–14 Anglo-Welsh Cup. He scored his first two tries in his debut in the European Rugby Challenge Cup against Romanian side Bucuresti Wolves back in October 2014. He made his Premiership Rugby debut from off the bench against Saracens back in December 2014.

A broken arm and then a serious knee ligament injury restricted Penny to just a single senior appearance during the 2016–17 season.

On 27 December 2019, Penny signed for Harlequins for the remainder of the 2019–20 season. He made his debut for Harlequins on the starting XV against Clermont Auvergne in the 2019–20 European Rugby Champions Cup.

On 25 August 2020, Penny resigns with his hometown club Newcastle Falcons on a two-year deal from the 2020–21 season.
