= Toby Flood =

England international rugby union player

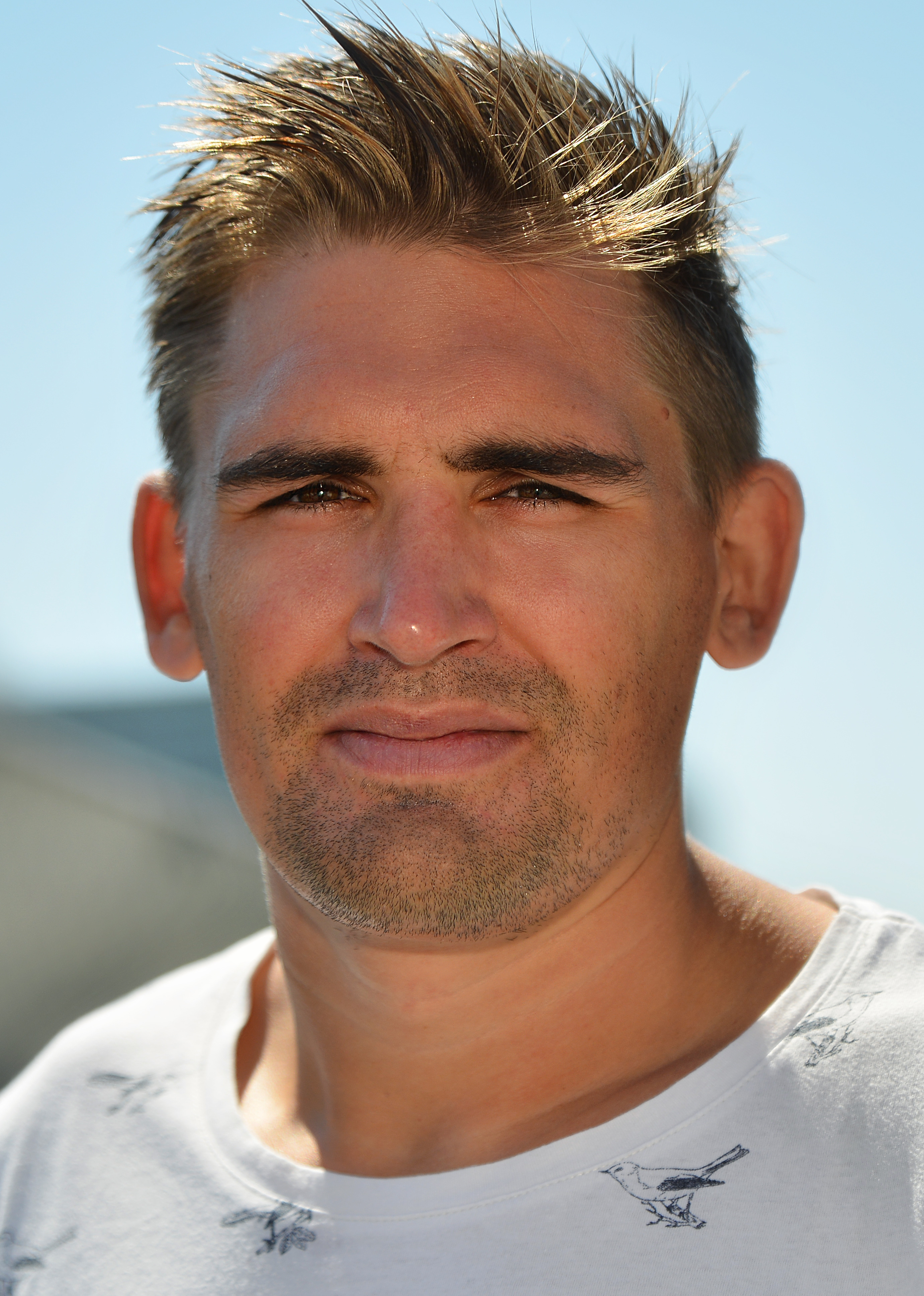
- Toby Flood in 2016
- Born: Tobias Gerald Albert Lieven Flood; 8 August 1985 (age 41) Frimley, Surrey, England
- Height: 1.88 m (6 ft 2 in)
- Weight: 91 kg (14 st 5 lb)
- School: The King's School
- University: Northumbria University, University of Cambridge
- Notable relative: Gerald Flood

Rugby union career
- Position: Fly-half / Centre
Amateur team(s)
Years	Team	Apps	(Points)
–	Alnwick		
–	Morpeth RFC		
Senior career
Years	Team	Apps	(Points)
2004–2008	Newcastle Falcons	76	(263)
2008–2014	Leicester Tigers	119	(1,336)
2014–2017	Toulouse	60	(337)
2017–2021	Newcastle Falcons	65	(348)
2004–2021	Total	320	(2,284)
- Correct as of 28 November 2020
International career
Years	Team	Apps	(Points)
2006–2014	England	60	(301)
Coaching career
- Years: Team
- 2021–: Newcastle Falcons (Kicking and Skills Coach)

Tobias Gerald Albert Lieven Flood (born 8 August 1985) is an English rugby union coach and former player. He is currently kicking and skills coach at Newcastle Falcons in Premiership Rugby. During his playing career, his position was fly half or inside centre. He played over 300 games in his club career across his three professional clubs, Newcastle Falcons, Toulouse and Leicester Tigers. He played 60 international matches for England between 2006 and 2014.

== Early life ==
Toby Flood was born on 8 August 1985 at Frimley Park Hospital in Frimley, Surrey. Both of his grandfathers were actors. His paternal grandfather, Gerald Flood, voiced the robot companion Kamelion in Doctor Who. His maternal grandfather was German actor Albert Lieven, who appeared in The Guns of Navarone, and his maternal grandmother was English actress Susan Shaw. Flood's father (Tim) was Theatre Manager of the National Theatre, London, General Manager at the Redgrave Theatre, Farnham and (2013) the Programme and Marketing manager of the Customs House Theatre, South Shields.

Flood was brought up in Morpeth, Northumberland where he attended Chantry School. He also went to the Kings School in Tynemouth. Flood graduated from Northumbria University in 2007 with a degree in business management, and has also undertaken a Graduate Diploma in Law, in preparation for his planned post-rugby career as a lawyer.

== Club career ==
=== Newcastle Falcons ===
A product of the Falcons academy, his third year at the university was completed on a part-time basis due to his rugby commitments. Jonny Wilkinson trained the Kings School first team while Flood was a student there.

=== Leicester Tigers ===
On 3 May 2008, it was announced that Flood was set to leave Newcastle Falcons for Leicester Tigers. He was officially confirmed as a Leicester player on 11 June 2008.

As a Tigers player, he settled at fly-half, having been switched between centre and fly-half in his career up until then. He was the first to top their points scoring list in a debut season since Dusty Hare in 1976–77. His debut game was in the first game of the season, against Gloucester, in which he managed to score a try. The shine came off his season, however, when he injured his Achilles tendon in the 2008–09 Heineken Cup semi-final game against Cardiff Blues – right before professional rugby's first ever sudden-death kicking competition. He was unable to take part in either of the Tigers' finals that year.

The injury ruled Flood out of the first two months of the 2009–10 season as well, and he returned in November, in a 2009–10 LV= Cup win against Newport Gwent Dragons. He stayed relatively injury-free for the rest of the season, however, and his good form helped the Tigers to top the table. They went on to win the 2009–10 Guinness Premiership final 33–27 against Saracens.

Flood captained the Tigers to victory over fierce rivals Northampton Saints in the 2013 Premiership Rugby final. On 21 December 2013, it was announced that Flood would leave the Tigers.

=== Toulouse ===
The Daily Telegraph reported that Flood had signed for Toulouse.

=== Return to Newcastle Falcons and retirement ===
On 9 May 2017, it was announced that Flood would return to Newcastle Falcons for the 2017–18 season, signalling a return to his first top-flight club more than 9 years after he left them for Tigers. On 6 September 2021, Flood announced his retirement from playing and his new role as kicking and skills coach for Newcastle.

== International career ==
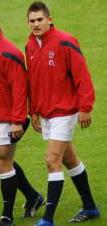
Flood warming up for England

In the autumn of 2006, he came on twice as a fly-half replacement for England, his first cap coming in the defeat to Argentina. With Brian Ashton installed as the new England head coach, Flood was selected in the Elite squad for England's 2007 Six Nations campaign. Flood came on as a replacement in the game against Scotland to win his fourth England cap. He started his first game for England against France at Twickenham and went on to score a try, helping England to a 26–18 victory. His personal points tally in the match was 16 points. Flood also started in the defeat to Wales.

Ashton included Flood in the Elite squad for 2007 Rugby World Cup campaign of France, as a replacement for then Newcastle teammate Jamie Noon. He came on as a substitute in the quarter-final against Australia, which England won 12–10. Flood also came off the bench in the semi-final win over France and in the loss in the World Cup final to South Africa. He scored England's opening try in the 2008 Six Nations game against Wales, and managed another the following game against Italy.

After acting as a substitute in the first two games of the 2009 Six Nations, Flood started the away game against Ireland, and held onto the fly-half jersey for the remaining two wins against France and Scotland. His achilles injury saw him lose it to former clubmate Jonny Wilkinson for the 2009 autumn internationals, but he started the first 2010 Six Nations game against Wales at inside centre, due to an injury to Riki Flutey. He finished the Six Nations once more in possession of the England 10 shirt during the game against France, and retained it for the Australia summer tour. Although England lost the first game, Flood was able to link up with his club colleague Ben Youngs in a strong half-back pairing in the second. A much improved performance saw England beat Australia 20–21.

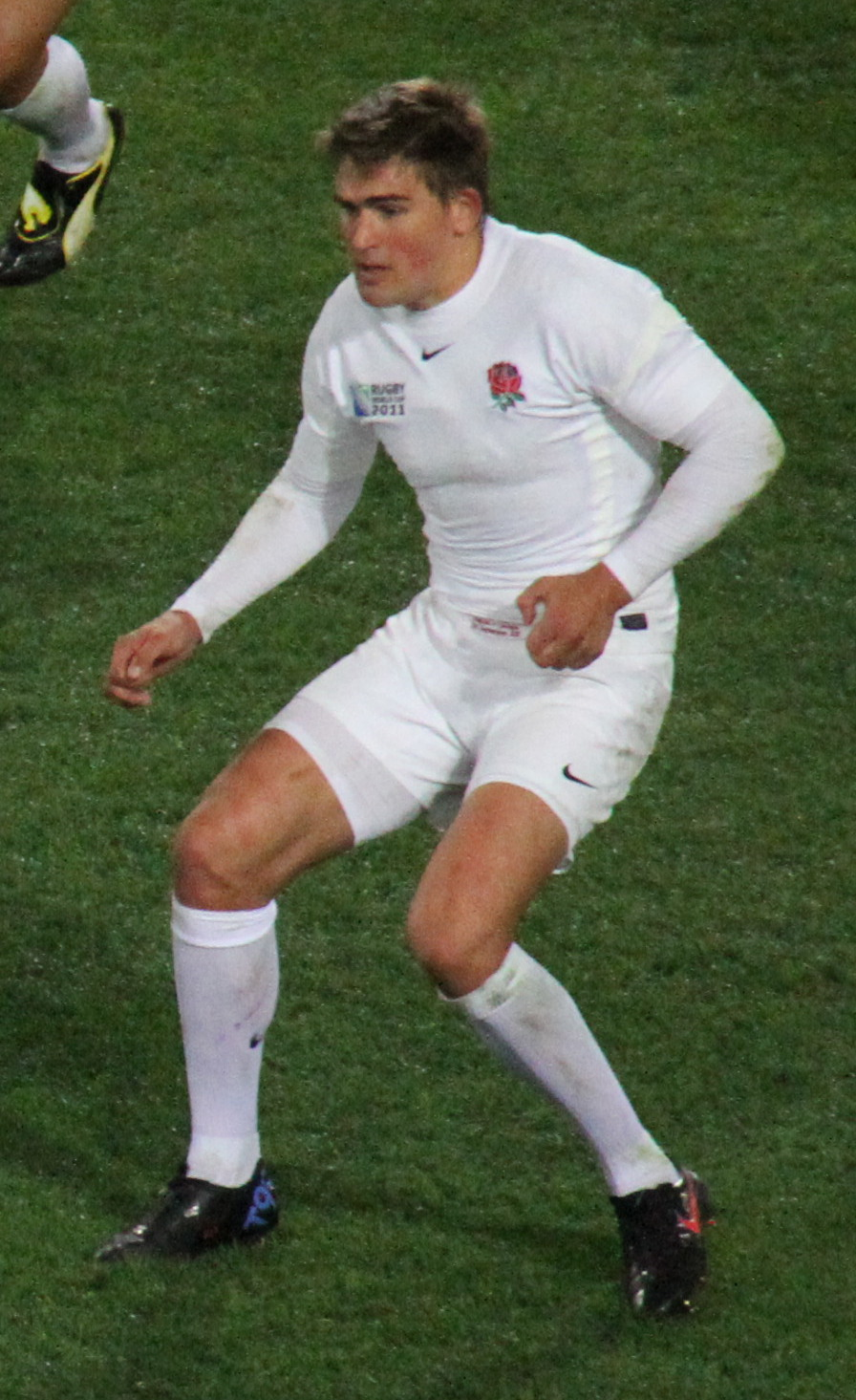
Flood during 2011 RWC

Flood's link with Youngs developed over the autumn internationals, starting with a good display in a loss to New Zealand. The team peaked in the Test against Australia, in which Flood had an immaculate game with the boot. He scored 25 points, which is the most points recorded by an Englishman against the Wallabies. He also helped England to a victory over Samoa, but was injured early into the last game with South Africa, and later revealed he couldn't remember anything after the incident.

In the 2011 Six Nations, Flood and Youngs again combined to great success, Flood gaining man of the match for a strong display against Wales at the Millennium Stadium. He was also a key component in several of the tries scored against Italy, developing a key relationship with wing Chris Ashton.

Despite Flood's good form for England during their Championship-winning 2011 Six Nations, he dropped for Jonny Wilkinson by the start of the 2011 Rugby World Cup. Flood started the quarter-final defeat to France at inside centre.

Flood was a hot favourite for the England captaincy when Stuart Lancaster took over from Martin Johnson after the World Cup. However he was not available for much of the 2012 Six Nations and Owen Farrell seized his chance at fly half. Flood regained his position on the tour to South Africa and in the autumn internationals of that year. A combination of injuries and Lancaster's preference for Owen Farrell's pragmatic approach, as well as Farrell's key role in England's shock win over New Zealand, limited his game time after this.

Flood's final start for England was against Italy in the 2013 Six Nations tournament. He effectively ended his England career by signing for Top 14 club Toulouse.

In an interview with The Times on 21 August 2017, Flood revealed that he would consider resurrecting his Test career by playing rugby for Germany. Changes to the World Rugby eligibility regulations introduced in 2017 allow a player to make a one-time switch of nationality by playing in an Olympic event for the player's new country, provided that said player has not represented his or her first country for three years and holds nationality in the second country. Flood applied for a German passport following the 2016 Brexit vote, and has already satisfied the three-year stand-down period.
