= Novocastrians RFC =

English rugby union club, based in Newcastle upon Tyne

(England) Novocastrians RFC
- Full name: Novocastrians Rugby Football Club
- Union: Northumberland RFU
- Nickname(s): Novos, ‘Vos
- Founded: 15 September 1899; 126 years ago as Old Novocastrians Rugby Football Club
- Location: The Drive, Benton, Tyne and Wear, England
- Ground: Sutherland Park (Capacity: 1,150 (150 on balconies))
- President: (England) Nick Cotterill
- Coach: (New Zealand) Magnus Leask
- Captain: (England) Dylan Gittins
- League: Regional 2 North
- 2025-26: 1st
1st kit	2nd kit

Official website
- www.novos.co.uk

Novocastrians Rugby Football Club is a rugby union team that is situated in the North East of England and currently play their rugby in Regional 2 North. The club is more generally known as Novos. Novos were formed in September 1899 as Old Novocastrians Rugby Football Club by a group of former pupils of the Royal Grammar School, Newcastle upon Tyne. The club remained for Old Boys or members of staff of the school until 1969 when the 'Old' was dropped and the club became open to all. Novos used to regularly field seven senior sides in the 1980s and 1990s. Currently, the club fields three senior sides, two ladies' sides, a 35+ year old side and also a junior section.

== History ==
=== Formation and Royal Grammar School origins ===
On 15 September 1899, Old Novocastrians Rugby Football Club was formed by a group of former pupils of the Royal Grammar School, Newcastle. A letter was circulated announcing:

A proposed new club for Newcastle: A meeting will be held at the Grammar School, Rye Hill under the auspices of Old Novocastrians Club, for the purpose of forming a new rugby club. The attendance of Grammar school boys is specially required.

The term Novocastrian derives from the Latin Novus (new) and Castrum (fort or castle), and historically referred to inhabitants of Newcastle upon Tyne, recorded in medieval Latin as Novocastrum. The term was later adopted by former pupils of the Royal Grammar School. The first match was played against North Durham 2nd XV on 23 September 1899 at Felling, only days after formation, followed by the club's first victory on 21 October 1899 against Walker. In the early years, Old Novocastrians had no permanent home ground and played at various venues across Newcastle, including Walker, Wallsend and Gosforth.

=== Early development and county rugby ===
By the early 20th century, the club had become established within Northumberland rugby. Percy Phillips became the first Old Novocastrian to represent Northumberland, playing against Durham in 1906. By 1914, eleven players from the club had represented the county. In 1908, Phillips and Buck Stewart both appeared for Northumberland in the same fixture against Cumberland. In 1909, the club faced structural difficulties due to limited membership and lack of a permanent ground, leading to an amalgamation with St George's Rugby Football Club, which strengthened playing numbers. Between 1911 and 1913, the club enjoyed one of its strongest early periods, reaching the Northumberland Senior Cup final and regularly fielding competitive first XV sides. Administrative leadership during this period included John Bell and Eddie Watson. In 1910, Northumberland played a county fixture at RGS’ ground with three Old Novocastrians in the side during a 17–6 win over Cheshire. In 1912, four club players represented the county against Cheshire.

=== First World War and post-war instability ===
The outbreak of the First World War in 1914 halted rugby activity, with approximately 92 per cent of club members joining the armed forces. Competitive rugby ceased during the war years. Following the war, the club reformed in 1919 but faced major difficulties, including loss of its ground lease and financial liabilities. Temporary arrangements were made to play at the school fields of the Royal Grammar School, Newcastle before a period of instability followed, with fixtures played across multiple venues including Benton Road golf course, Brough Park Racecourse and West Avenue, Gosforth. In 1925, the club secured a more stable base at Benton Lodge following negotiations supported by guarantors including Eddie Watson, Don Ash and Paul Lazzari.

=== Sutherland Park and inter-war development ===
In 1927, Sir Arthur Sutherland financed the purchase of the ground at Benton Lodge for £4,000, enabling the club to establish a permanent home. The ground was renamed Sutherland Park, and significant investment followed, including the construction of a clubhouse, which was completed in 1928 and remains in use. The first match at the new pavilion was played in April 1928 against Ryton. During the inter-war period, the club entered a successful phase, with thirteen Old Novocastrians representing Northumberland in the 1930s. The club reached the Northumberland Senior Cup final in 1933, 1934 and 1938, and also achieved success across multiple XVs in Northumberland RFU competitions. A long-standing rivalry with Gosforth developed during this period, with fixtures attracting large local crowds.

=== Second World War and post-war rebuilding ===
The Second World War again halted competitive rugby, with many players serving in the armed forces. The club resumed activity in 1945, initially fielding a single team before rebuilding to multiple senior sides by the late 1940s. Administrative leadership by Eddie Watson and Walter Dix was central to the club's post-war recovery. In 1949, the club celebrated its 50th anniversary. During the post-war era, several players represented Northumberland, including Eric Reeve, Brian Reeve, George Thompson and Peter Taylor. Taylor later became Lord Chief Justice of England and Wales and chaired the Taylor Report into the Hillsborough disaster.

=== 1960s and transition to open membership ===
In 1959 John Elders, England Head Coach (1972–74) and sports master at the Royal Grammar School, joined the club as player and captain and helped revitalise the club. In 1965, the clubhouse was extended. In 1969, membership was opened beyond former pupils of the Royal Grammar School and the club became Novocastrians Rugby Football Club.

=== League rugby and 1980s–1990s success ===
The introduction of league rugby in 1987 saw Novocastrians placed in North East 2, achieving promotion unbeaten in their first season. They later reached North East 1 and remained there for six seasons. The club regularly competed against competed against sides including Rotherham and Doncaster, while maintaining traditional New Year fixtures against Newcastle Red Bulls (Gosforth), including notable victories in 1988 and 1989. At its peak, the club fielded up to seven senior teams.

=== Women's rugby and early 1990s developments ===
In 1992, Novocastrians reached the Northumberland Senior Cup Final. Women's rugby was also introduced at the end of the season, becoming the eight senior side within the Club. The women's team won National Division Three in 1994 with a perfect season and were promoted into the Premiership structure in 1995. A clubhouse extension was completed in 1994.

=== Decline, restructuring and modern era ===
By 2001, Novocastrians had reached Durham/Northumberland 3 following a period of decline. The club rebuilt through the 2000s, gaining promotions and stabilising in higher divisions. In 2016, they won the Northumberland Senior Plate, repeating in 2018 and 2026. The club reached the Northumberland Senior Cup final in 2022, losing to Alnwick RFC. The club currently plays in Regional 2 North after winning Counties 1 Durham & Northumberland in 2026, finishing top of the league in 2025–26, the Club's highest finish of the 21st Century.

== League history ==
The 1987–88 season saw a major reorganisation of English community rugby, placing Novocastrians (Novos) into North East 2. The club felt this was below their level and protested the decision; however, this proved academic as Novos completed the season unbeaten, winning the title and securing promotion to North East 1.

Novos experienced mixed fortunes over the next six seasons in North East 1, achieving their highest league finish of 5th place in 1988–89. Back-to-back relegations followed, from North East 1 in 1993–94 and North East 2 in 1994–95, which placed the club in Durham & Northumberland 1 for the 1995–96 season. A further relegation in 1996–97 saw Novos drop into Durham & Northumberland 2.

Promotion was immediate, as Novos finished runners-up in 1997–98 to return to Durham & Northumberland 1. However, the club remained there for only two seasons before relegation in 1999–2000, followed by a drop in 2000–01 into Durham & Northumberland 3, the lowest level in their history.

Novos responded strongly, winning the Durham & Northumberland 3 title in 2001–02 to gain promotion back to Durham & Northumberland 2. A period of relative stability followed, with the club spending seven consecutive seasons at this level.

A league restructuring, which increased division sizes from 12 to 14 teams, saw Novos promoted to Durham & Northumberland 1 in 2009 after winning a play-off against Barnard Castle. The club remained there for three seasons before being relegated in 2011–12.

Novos again secured immediate promotion, finishing second in 2012–13 to return to Durham & Northumberland 1. The club then spent 13 consecutive seasons in the division, experiencing mixed results.

In 2025–26, Novos won Durham & Northumberland 1 and were promoted to Regional 2 North, marking their first return to a level above the Durham & Northumberland leagues since 1995.

Season	League Name	Position (League Size)	P	W	D	L	PF	PA	+/-	Pts	Notes
1987-88	North East 2	1st (11)	10	9	1	0	137	72	+65	19	Champions and promoted to North East 1.
1988-89	North East 1	5th (11)	10	6	0	4	104	141	-37	12	One fixture against each team.
1989-90	North East 1	9th (11)	10	3	0	7	118	183	-65	6	One fixture against each team.
1990-91	North East 1	10th (11)	10	3	0	7	77	117	-40	6	One fixture against each team.
1991-92	North East 1	10th (11)	10	2	0	8	86	172	-86	4	One fixture against each team.
1992-93	North East 1	6th (13)	12	5	3	4	148	129	+19	13	League sized increased to 13 teams.
1993-94	North East 1	13th (13)	12	2	1	9	84	138	-54	5	Relegated to North East 2.
1994-95	North East 2	13th (13)	12	2	0	10	112	196	-84	4	Relegated to Durham/Northumberland 1.
1995-96	Durham/Northumberland 1	7th (12)	12	6	0	6	196	271	-75	12	One fixture against each team.
1996-97	Durham/Northumberland 1	8th (10)	18	4	0	14	254	365	-111	8	Relegated to Durham/Northumberland 2, fixtures home and away.
1997-98	Durham/Northumberland 2	2nd (10)	18	16	0	2	522	175	+347	30	Deducted 2 points; Promoted to Durham/Northumberland 1
1998-99	Durham/Northumberland 1	5th (10)	18	8	1	9	304	304	0	17	-
1999-00	Durham/Northumberland 1	9th (10)	18	2	1	15	136	447	-311	5	Relegated to Durham/Northumberland 2. Fixtures not completed due to Foot-and-mouth disease.
2000-01	Durham/Northumberland 2	12th (12)	21	2	0	19	212	615	-403	4	Relegated to Durham/Northumberland 3.
2001-02	Durham/Northumberland 3	1st (12)	22	21	0	1	542	208	+334	42	Champions and promoted to Durham/Northumberland 2.
2002-03	Durham/Northumberland 2	3rd (12)	22	15	1	6	503	329	+174	31	-
2003-04	Durham/Northumberland 2	7th (12)	22	9	0	13	488	389	+99	18	-
2004-05	Durham/Northumberland 2	5th (12)	22	10	2	10	359	330	+29	22	-
2005-06	Durham/Northumberland 2	6th (12)	22	11	0	11	283	423	-140	22	-
2006-07	Durham/Northumberland 2	3rd (12)	22	16	0	6	496	242	+254	32	-
2007-08	Durham/Northumberland 2	5th (12)	22	13	0	9	423	314	+109	26	-
2008-09	Durham/Northumberland 2	5th (12)	22	13	0	9	459	386	+73	26	Promoted to Durham/Northumberland 1 after reorganisation.
2009-10	Durham/Northumberland 1	9th (14)	26	8	1	17	418	756	-338	17	League sized increased increases to 14 teams.
2010-11	Durham/Northumberland 1	10th (14)	26	8	1	17	500	811	-311	43	4 points for a win and bonus points introduced.
2011-12	Durham/Northumberland 1	14th (14)	26	3	1	22	266	1014	-748	16	Relegated to Durham/Northumberland 2.
2012-13	Durham/Northumberland 2	2nd (12)	24	20	0	4	746	383	+363	98	Promoted to Durham/Northumberland 1.
2013-14	Durham/Northumberland 1	12th (14)	26	4	2	20	489	823	-334	36	-
2014-15	Durham/Northumberland 1	10th (14)	26	9	0	17	551	807	-256	55	-
2015-16	Durham/Northumberland 1	4th (14)	26	17	1	8	847	568	+279	85	-
2016-17	Durham/Northumberland 1	12th (14)	26	9	0	17	543	783	-240	44	Deducted 5 points.
2017-18	Durham/Northumberland 1	10th (14)	24	9	0	14	587	799	-212	50	-
2018-19	Durham/Northumberland 1	6th (14)	26	15	0	11	828	812	+16	73	Deducted 5 points.
2019-20	Durham/Northumberland 1	6th (14)	22	13	0	9	551	605	-54	64	Season curtailed COVID-19 pandemic.
2020-21	Durham/Northumberland 1	N/A	0	0	0	0	0	0	0	0	Season not played due to COVID-19 pandemic.
2021-22	Durham/Northumberland 1	10th (14)	26	7	0	19	521	898	-377	37	-
2022-23	Durham/Northumberland 1	10th (12)	22	7	0	15	379	574	-195	35	-
2023-24	Durham/Northumberland 1	3rd (12)	22	18	0	4	767	467	+300	85	Deducted 5 points.
2024-25	Durham/Northumberland 1	2nd (12)	22	15	1	6	786	435	+351	82	-
2025-26	Durham/Northumberland 1	1st (12)	22	21	0	1	1121	331	+790	106	Champions and promoted to Regional 2 North.
Totals			758	361	17	379	15943	16812	-869	1290	

== Honours ==
- North East 2 champions: 1987–88
- Durham & Northumberland 1 champions: 2025–26
- Durham & Northumberland 3 champions: 2001–02
- Northumberland Senior Plate winners (3): 2016, 2018, 2026

== Notable Players and Members ==
- Sir Alfred Molyneux Palmer, 3rd Baronet (1853–1935), Industrialist and Old Novocastrians RFC President
- Sir Arthur Sutherland (1878–1953), Industrialist, politician and Old Novocastrians RFC President
- Sir Henry Wilson Smith (1904-1978), Senior Civil Servant and Novocastrians RFC Patron
- John Elders (1930–2015) England Rugby Head Coach, Leicester Tigers captain and Old Novocastrians RFC captain
- Peter Taylor, Baron Taylor of Gosforth (1930–1997), Lord Chief Justice (1992–96)
- Jim Pollock (born 1958) Scottish International, Barbarian FC and Novocastrians RFC captain
- John Jeffrey (born 1959) Scottish International
- Nick Brownlee (born 1967) Crime thriller writer
- Simon Johnson (born 1970), cricketer
- Sarah Hunter (born 1985) England Women's International
