= Whitley Bay Rockcliff RFC =

Rugby union team in North Tyneside, England

(England) Rockcliff RFC
- Full name: Whitley Bay Rockcliff Rugby Football Club
- Union: Northumberland RFU
- Founded: 1887; 139 years ago
- Location: Whitley Bay, North Tyneside, England
- League: Durham/Northumberland 1
- 2024–25: 12th

Official website
- www.rockcliffrfc.co.uk

Whitley Bay Rockcliff RFC is a rugby union team based in Whitley Bay, North Tyneside in north-east England. The club play in Counties 2 Durham & Northumberland – the eighth tier of the English rugby union system, following the club's relegation from of Counties 1 Durham & Northumberland at the end of the 2024–25 season.

== History ==
The rugby club was founded in 1887 at a large meeting held at Landreth's Hotel [now the Victoria], Whitley...it was resolved to re-establish The Rockcliff Football Club. ″The proceedings were most enthusiastic and the club commences with a very considerable list of members.".

== Honours ==
- Northumberland Senior Cup (13): 1890, 1892, 1893, 1894, 1895, 1896, 1898, 1900, 1901, 1902, 1905, 1909, 1920
- Northumberland Senior Plate: 2023
- Durham/Northumberland 1 champions: 1988–89
- Durham/Northumberland 2 champions: 2018–19

== Notable players ==
- Stan Anderson, one Test match for England in the 1899 Home Nations Championship.
- Craig Hamilton Ex-Scottish international (5 caps), who previously played for both Glasgow Warriors and Edinburgh Rugby joined Rockcliff IXV in 2018 as player coach. He still continues to play in a social capacity at Rockcliff.
- Nathan Greenwood, England Rugby Under-18’s Sevens 2021–22 season and Newcastle Falcons winger since summer of 2022
