= Aubrey Dowson =

England international rugby union player

Aubrey Dowson MC
- Full name: Aubrey Osler Dowson
- Born: 10 November 1874 Stockport, England
- Died: 5 October 1940 (aged 65) Hanging Langford, England

Rugby union career
- Position: Forward
International career
Years	Team	Apps	(Points)
1899	England	1	(0)

Aubrey Osler Dowson (10 November 1874 – 5 October 1940) was an English international rugby union player.

Born in Stockport, Dowson was educated at Rugby School and New College, Oxford. He gained a rugby blue in 1896 and was a varsity athlete, specialising in the throwing events. A forward, Dowson also played rugby with Birmingham club Moseley and in 1899 was capped for England against Scotland at Blackheath.

Dowson served in France with the 12th Rifle Brigade during World War I and was decorated with the Military Cross.

== See also ==
- List of England national rugby union players
