= McCracken Park =

Sports venue in Gosforth, Newcastle, England

- Interactive map of McCracken Park
- Location: Gosforth, Newcastle, England
- Coordinates: 55.023°N 1.62°W
- Capacity: 1,000
- Surface: Grass

Construction
- Opened: October 1937

Tenant
- Northern Football Club

McCracken Park is the home of Northern FC (Rugby Union Club) Northern Football Club in Gosforth, Newcastle upon Tyne, England. Northern FC currently has teams across Men's and Age Grade rugby union. It also has a flourishing Girls Age Grade section. Northern Squash Club (wazygoose.com) also reside at McCracken Park and have a strong membership.

== The ground ==
The ground is named after Angus McCracken, who was the Club President when it was built. It was officially opened by Ald. G. B. Bainbridge in October 1937.

In 1956 squash courts were built in addition to the clubhouse. In 1961 a cocktail bar was also added. A third squash court was added in 1974. The current clubhouse was opened on 18 December 1994 at the cost of £1 million. This included a fourth glass-back squash court, a new players bar and a functions bar.

McCracken Park welcomes all to its clubhouse facilities - the Terrace Bar is open to non-members - with a drinks and vista out over the pitches and nearby woodland.

There are regular food night events which again are open to all - pre-booking required.

McCracen Park ground capacity was listed in 1990 as being 1,200 with 1,000 standing and 200 seated in a wooden grandstand. The wooden grandstand has since ceased to exist, although it was mentioned as recently as 2010, meaning modern ground capacity is now just 1,000 (all standing).
