= Berwick RFC =

Coordinates: 55.73883°N 1.98996°W

Berwick Rugby Club
- Full name: Berwick Rugby Football Club
- Union: Northumberland RFU, Scottish RU
- Founded: 1926
- Location: Berwick-upon-Tweed, England
- Ground: Scremerston (Capacity: 10,000)
- Chairman: Board of Members
- League: Scottish National League Division Two
- 2024–25: Scottish National League Division Two, 6th of 9
1st kit	2nd kit

Official website
- www.berwickrugbyclub.co.uk

Berwick Rugby Football Club is a rugby union team that was founded in 1926, and reformed in 1968. The team is based in the town of Berwick-upon-Tweed, on the English side of the border with Scotland. They are affiliated to both the English Rugby Football Union and the Scottish Rugby Union. They compete in Scottish National League Division Two.

Berwick play their home games at Scremerston.

== History ==
Berwick Rugby club was formed in the SRU in 1926 and played in the South District Union. Its playing standard improved until the early 1930s and although it survived annual difficulties of finding players and pitches it could not survive the outbreak of the Second World War which robbed it of both. When the club was reborn in 1968 it had three main aims - to strive for as high a standard of rugby as possible for the club and its individual members, to create a good physical environment for rugby, and to be part of the sporting and social fabric of Berwick. Pursuit of the first aim has taken the Club to the BT Scottish Premiership (Division 2). In 2004 it won the National Shield and in 2006 reached the semi-finals of the Scottish Cup. To date, the highest individual honours are headed by the 17 full Scottish caps won by Craig Smith and the thirty three by Gavin Kerr. Both were in the 2006 Six Nations Squad. Kerr was a member of the 2003 World Cup Squad and the Six Nations Squads of 2004 and 2005. Mark Lee captained the Scottish VII in 2002 Commonwealth Games and played with the British Army in 2005. Andrew Skeen played for the Scotland VII in the 2006 IRB Tournament. Current Berwick players have won many age-group, School and Student international and regional honours and the Club boasts a full international referee in Iain Ramage. In 2001 the club was invited to join the Border League, becoming only the second English Club in rugby's oldest league. The club has sides in the Border League, the new cross-Border League, the Border Semi-Junior League and age-group competitions from minis to Colts on both sides of the Border. The club has an increasingly skilled Ladies section which won promotion in 1999 and 2000 and was runner-up in the National Bowl in 2004.

London Scottish is another example of a rugby club in both the English and Scottish rugby unions.

== Berwick Sevens ==
The rugby club runs the Berwick Sevens tournament. This takes place annually in April and the competition is part of the Kings of the Sevens tournament.

It has been won by the hosts only the once, in 1986.

Current holders of the trophy (2019) are Watsonians.

== Notable players ==
Notable players for Berwick RFC include

- Craig Smith capped for Scotland
- Gavin Kerr capped for Scotland
- (Scotland) James King who played for Edinburgh Rugby
- Andrew Skeen - Melrose, Rugby Roma Olimpic & Scotland 7s
- / (United Kingdom) Mark 'Scruff' Lee - Edinburgh Rugby & Border Reivers, Barbarians, Army 15s and 7s, Scotland 7s and GB 7s
- (United Kingdom) Jason Girdwood
- (United Kingdom) Travis Watson

== Honours ==
- Berwick Sevens
  - Champions (1): 1986
- Hawick Linden Sevens
  - Champions (1): 2012
- Northumberland Senior Cup: 1997
- Northumberland Senior Plate: 2003

Scottish Shield winners: 2004, 2019.

== See also ==
- Berwick-upon-Tweed
- Border League
- Borders Sevens Circuit
