= Northumberland Rugby Football Union =

Governing body for rugby union in England

(England) Northumberland RFU
- Full name: Northumberland Rugby Football Union
- Union: RFU
- Founded: 1880; 146 years ago
- Region: Northumberland
- President: (England) Craig Wrightson
- Coach: (England) Darren Cunningham
Team kit

Official website
- northumberlandrugbyunion.com

The Northumberland Rugby Union is the governing body for rugby union in the historic county of Northumberland, England and one of the constituent bodies of the national Rugby Football Union having been formed in 1880. In addition, the county has won the county championship on two occasions, and finished runners-up on a further five occasions.

== History ==
The Union was founded in 1880 by six club sides. The six founding members were The Northumberland Football Club (defunct), The (original) Borough of Tynemouth Football Club (defunct), The Northern Football Club, The (original) Gosforth Football Club, The Tynedale Football Club and The Percy Park Football Club.

Northumberland were one of the very few counties to own their own ground. In 1912 they began using the land of the Northumberland County Ground and later built a stadium. Many international fixtures were played there; all County Finals were played at the ground until it was demolished in 1988.

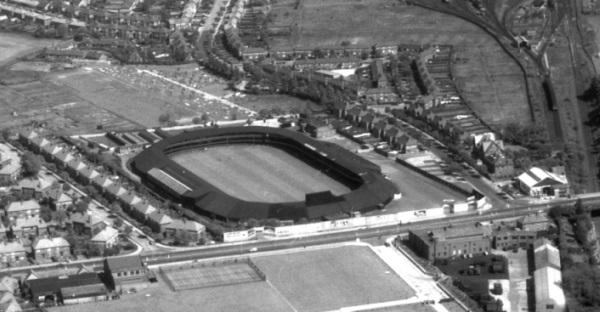
Northumberland County Ground in 1965

After moving from Scotland where he played for Royal HSFP and Edinburgh, James Robertson then played for Northumberland, a local club - but not the County team. Robertson was the first known black rugby union player.

== Northumberland senior men's county honours ==
- County Championship winners (2): 1898, 1981
- County Championship Plate winners (4): 2003, 2008, 2011, 2013

== Affiliated clubs ==
There are currently 24 clubs affiliated with the Northumberland RFU, making it one of the smaller unions in England. Most of the clubs in the Northumberland RFU have teams at both senior and junior level and are based either in Northumberland or Tyne and Wear.

- Alnwick
- Ashington
- Berwick (Note: Despite being based in Northumberland, Berwick play in the Scottish Regional League and are joint members of both the Northumberland RFU and the Scottish RU.)
- Blyth
- Border Park
- Gosforth
- Medicals
- Morpeth
- Newcastle Falcons
- Newcastle Ravens
- Newcastle University
- North Shields
- Northern
- Northumbria University
- Novocastrians
- Percy Park
- Ponteland
- Prudhoe & Stocksfield
- Seghill
- Tynedale
- Wallsend
- West End
- West Tynedale
- Whitley Bay Rockcliff

== County club competitions ==
The Northumberland RFU currently runs the following competitions for club sides based in Northumberland and Tyne and Wear:

=== Leagues ===
- Counties 1 Durham & Northumberland (alongside Durham RFU) - league ranked at tier 7 of the English rugby union system for clubs that are based in either County Durham, Northumberland or Tyne and Wear
- Counties 2 Durham & Northumberland - tier 8 league
- Counties 3 Durham & Northumberland - tier 9 league

=== Cups ===
- Northumberland Senior Cup - founded in 1882, typically open to clubs at tiers 4-6 of the English rugby union system
- Northumberland Senior Plate - founded in 2002, open to clubs at tiers 7–9

=== Discontinued competitions ===
- Durham/Northumberland 4 - tier 10 league that was discontinued in 2006

== See also ==
- Northern Division
- English rugby union system
