= Jim Pollock (rugby union) =

Scotland international rugby union player

- Born: James Allan Pollock; 16 November 1958 (age 67) Newcastle Upon Tyne

Rugby union career
- Position: Wing
Amateur team(s)
Years	Team	Apps	(Points)
1974-1979	Novocastrians		
1979-1981	Northern Football Club		
1981-1986	Gosforth		
1986-1995	Novocastrians		
International career
Years	Team	Apps	(Points)
1982-1985	Scotland	8	(8)

Jim Pollock (born 16 November 1958 in Newcastle) is a Scottish former international rugby union player. His nickname was "Lucky Jim". Jim played eight games for Scotland between 1982 and 1985. Famously scoring on his debut against Wales, at Cardiff Arms Park where Scotland hadn't won in 20 years. Jim scored his second try against New Zealand in a 25-25 draw - to date Scotland's best ever result against the All blacks. Pollock worked as a Police Officer for Northumbria Police and later Isle of Man and previously worked as a P.E. teacher at Kenton School & Royal Grammar School, Newcastle upon Tyne.
