= Tynedale RFC =

English rugby union club, based in Corbridge

(England) Tynedale
- Full name: Tynedale Rugby Football Club
- Union: Northumberland RFU
- Founded: 1876; 150 years ago
- Location: Corbridge, Northumberland, England
- Ground: Tynedale Park (Capacity: 2,000 (400 seats))
- Coach: (England) Ben Woods
- Captain: (England) Matt Outson (1st XV)
- League: National League 2 North
- 2025–26: 2nd
Team kit

Official website
- pitchero.com/tynedalerfc

Tynedale RFC is a rugby union team based in Corbridge, Northumberland in North East England. The club was relegated from National League 1 in 2015, the third tier of the English rugby union system and have played in National League 2 North since.

== History ==
The first match was against Elswick in 1876. In 1904 they won the Northumberland Senior Shield.

In 2008 they were promoted to National Division Two.

== Honours ==
- Northumberland Senior Cup (24): 1887, 1906, 1911, 1914, 1927, 1933, 1934, 1935, 1936, 1948, 1988, 1992, 1993, 1996, 1999, 2000, 2003, 2004, 2005, 2006, 2008, 2009, 2010, 2014
- Northumberland Senior Plate: 2025
- North Division 1 division champions: 1999–00
- National League 3 North champions: 2007–08
- Hawick and Wilton Sevens champions: 1885. (First winner of the tournament.)
- Gala Sevens champions: 1885
- Melrose Sevens champions: 1886
- Glasgow City Sevens champions: 2017

== Facilities ==
Over 35 acres (140,000 m^{2}) of land set in rural surround. The ground is adjacent to the River Tyne – a short walk over the bridge to the historical village of Corbridge. It has seven pitches, one fully floodlit training pitch (floodlighting adequate for 'junior' matches) and one smaller training pitch, fully floodlit – used for Colts training area. The ground has a modern, 400 seat grandstand, and there is also space for standing spectators around the pitch bringing total capacity to approximately 2,000.

== Current standings ==
2026–27 National League 2 North table
| Pos | Team | Pld | W | D | L | PF | PA | PD | TB | LB | Pts | Qualification |
|---|---|---|---|---|---|---|---|---|---|---|---|---|
| 1 | Sedgley Park | 8 | 8 | 0 | 0 | 420 | 111 | +309 | 8 | 0 | 40 | Promotion place |
| 2 | Darlington Mowden Park | 8 | 6 | 0 | 2 | 388 | 159 | +229 | 7 | 1 | 32 | Promotion play-off |
| 3 | Chester | 8 | 6 | 0 | 2 | 315 | 214 | +101 | 6 | 1 | 31 | |
| 4 | Tynedale | 8 | 6 | 0 | 2 | 252 | 221 | +31 | 6 | 0 | 30 | |
| 5 | Hull Ionians | 7 | 5 | 0 | 2 | 276 | 220 | +56 | 7 | 1 | 28 | |
| 6 | Preston Grasshoppers | 8 | 5 | 0 | 3 | 295 | 235 | +60 | 6 | 1 | 27 | |
| 7 | Harrogate | 8 | 3 | 1 | 4 | 204 | 328 | −124 | 6 | 0 | 20 | |
| 8 | Sheffield Tigers | 8 | 3 | 0 | 5 | 225 | 229 | −4 | 5 | 3 | 20 | |
| 9 | Fylde | 8 | 3 | 0 | 5 | 198 | 253 | −55 | 5 | 0 | 17 | |
| 10 | Billingham | 8 | 3 | 0 | 5 | 222 | 350 | −128 | 5 | 0 | 17 | |
| 11 | Huddersfield | 8 | 2 | 1 | 5 | 202 | 362 | −160 | 5 | 1 | 16 | |
| 12 | Heath | 8 | 2 | 0 | 6 | 188 | 282 | −94 | 4 | 1 | 13 | Relegation play-off |
| 13 | Otley | 7 | 1 | 0 | 6 | 183 | 292 | −109 | 4 | 1 | 9 | Relegation place |
| 14 | Wharfedale | 8 | 1 | 0 | 7 | 203 | 315 | −112 | 5 | 0 | 9 | Relegation place |

Updated to match(es) played on 2 September 2026. Source: National League Rugby
Rules for classification: If teams are level at any stage, tiebreakers are applied in the following order:
1. Number of matches won
2. Number of matches drawn
3. Difference between points for and against
4. Total number of points for
5. Aggregate number of points scored in matches between tied teams
6. Number of matches won excluding the first match, then the second and so on until the tie is settled
