= Northern Football Club =

English rugby union club, based in Newcastle upon Tyne

(England) Northern
- Full name: Northern Football Club
- Union: Northumberland RFU
- Founded: 1875; 151 years ago
- Location: Newcastle upon Tyne, Tyne and Wear, England
- Ground: McCracken Park (Capacity: 1,000)
- Chairman: Richard Kain
- President: Jim Pollock
- Director of Rugby: Ron Borley
- Coach(es): 1st XV - Dave Guthrie & Jim Pollock
- Captain: 1st XV - Tom McCullough
- League: Regional 2 North
- 2024–25: 2nd
Team kit

Official website
- northernfc.rfu.club

Northern Football Club are a rugby union club that was founded in 1875, and is based in Gosforth, Newcastle upon Tyne. Their strip is coloured navy blue, red and white. They currently play in Regional 2 North, the sixth tier of the English rugby union system, having been promoted from Durham Northumberland One at the end of the 2021–22 season. Northern field three senior teams. These are the first team, Northern Wanderers (2nd team) and Northern Panthers (3rd team). Northern have a large and successful mini and youth rugby set-up.

== History ==
Northern Football Club was founded in 1875 as Elswick Football Club but was renamed in its second season changing the team's colours to red white and blue, which have remained the team strip throughout its history and is the oldest Rugby Football Club in Newcastle upon Tyne.

Northern originally played at Mill Inn, Westgate but were forced to alternate playing grounds and remained without a 'home ground' for over 60 years. In 1937, McCracken Park was purchased and was officially named after the then Club President Angus McCracken and has operated at McCracken Park ever since. In 1956, squash courts were added to the club, with further courts added in 1974. On 18 December 1994, the present clubhouse was opened at a cost of £1 million.

Northern Football Club was very successful during its early history, producing several international players. The first player to be capped directly from the club was England half back Mason Scott in 1890. In its 125-year history Northern has also supplied Presidents of the Rugby Football Union and the Scottish Rugby Union. In its early history the club would regularly put out six teams plus a Youth and a veterans side.

During the late 19th century, William Cail, the Northern FC President, became the president of the RFU (1892–1894) during the time of the split between the RFU and the Northern Union.

The last player capped at international level directly from Northern was Feidlim McLoughlin, who was selected to play for Ireland in 1977. Though many players have played for Northern who have later become international players and, including Jonathan Webb, Brian Keen, David Rees and Colin White for England, Scott Hastings and Jim Pollock for Scotland, Rory Best for Ireland and Hennie le Roux for South Africa. A past player of note is John Elders, who also coached the Senior XV also coached England in the 1970s. Elders was the first coach to take an England side to South Africa and win a test match.

Northern's local rivals are Gosforth RFC. In season 1998–99 Northern were narrowly beaten by Doncaster R.F.C. for promotion to the National Leagues.

== Youth team ==
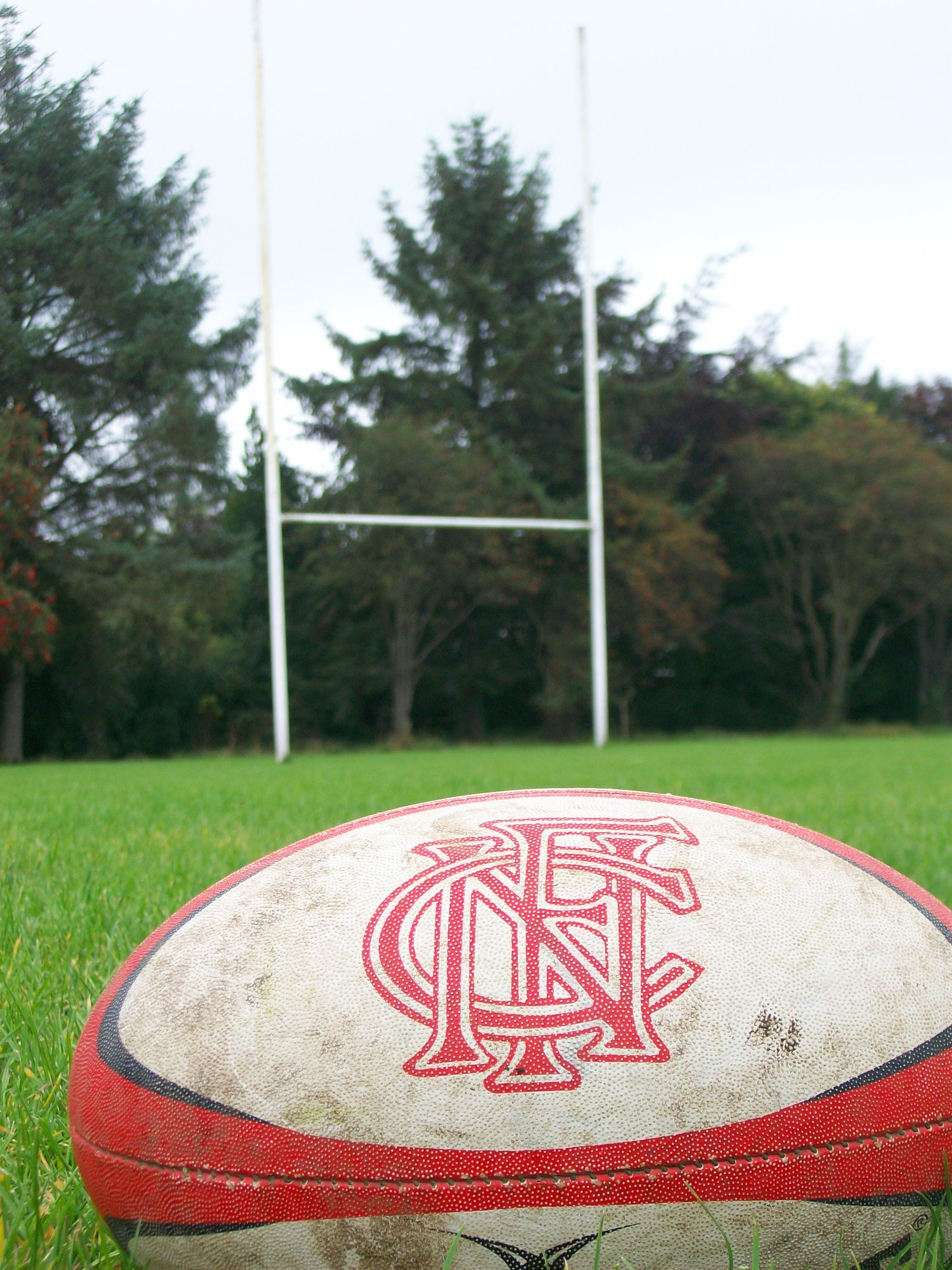
Northern Football Club crest on rugby ball

Northern Football Club run youth teams for Under 6s to under 17s, playing fixtures primarily throughout the North East but also travelling further afield to compete in tournaments. The younger teams only play touch rugby, until they are old enough to tackle safely. Because there are so many mini and junior members at the club, training is split into three different locations. These are Northern's home - McCracken Park, Gosforth Academy and Druid Park.

== Honours ==
- Northumberland Senior Cup (17): 1882, 1884, 1888, 1889, 1891, 1903, 1904, 1912, 1926, 1929, 1931, 1937, 1955, 1959, 1961, 1970, 1989, 1995, 2023
- North Division 2 champions: 1997–98
- Durham/Northumberland 1 champions (3): 2002–03, 2009–10, 2016–17
