= Percy Park RFC =

English rugby union club, based in North Shields, Tyne & Wear

Percy Park
- Full name: Percy Park Rugby Union Football Club
- Union: Northumberland RFU
- Founded: 1872; 154 years ago
- Location: North Shields, Tyne and Wear, England
- Region: North East
- Ground: Preston Avenue
- Chairman: Albert Durhin
- Coach: Ash Smith
- Captain: Seb Reece
- Top scorer: Ash Smith (2012-2013)
- League: Regional 2 North
- 2023–24: 1st (promoted to Regional 1 North East)
Team kit

Official website
- www.percyparkrfc.co.uk

Percy Park Rugby Football Club is an English rugby union team based in North Shields, Tyne & Wear. The club runs three senior sides and a full set of junior teams. The first XV currently plays in Regional 1 North East and the 2nd XV participates in Counties 3 Durham & Northumberland North.

== About ==
There are five pitches available, three with floodlights and two pitches belonging to Kings School, Tynemouth.

The structure at the club is broken into four areas:- mini / midi rugby, junior rugby, colts rugby and senior rugby. In addition there is a touch rugby team, the Percy Park Pirates. Mini / midi rugby covers ages from under 7’s through to under 12’s with a team at each age group. These ages are part of a structured fixture with all the other clubs in Northumberland. Junior rRugby covers Under 13’s through to Under 16’s. Their games, both home and away are organized and managed by the respective age group coaches. The rules governing the playing of rugby at Junior level are also governed by the continuum.

== History ==
Percy Park Rugby Football Club was founded in 1872 by J. Stanley Todd, who lived at 60 Percy Park in Tynemouth. The team originally played in a field behind his home and the name of the club was derived from this street.

When the fields behind Percy Park were taken over for gardens in 1879, the club moved on and played on Collingwood Monument fields.

In 1881, the team moved and played on Dolphin Field; however, this was only available on Saturday afternoons. The players had to erect goal posts before the game and then take them down afterwards to be stored in the yard of the nearby Dolphin Inn.

Mr Dunn, the landlord of the inn, was a keen supporter and allowed his premises to be used for changing purposes. Meetings at this time were held at ‘Medley’s’ in Nile Street and later in the decade the committee met for a brief period at the Albion Inn and then for many years at ‘Raynors’, also in Nile Street. In 1882, just ten years after formation of the club, the membership reached 100.

By 1884, the club was playing at Hunt Hill, Hawkeys Lane which was also known as The Old Earl Percy Field and was situated to the south of Preston Cemetery.

It was said that the first team players had the privilege of using a bedroom in one of the cottages near the gate as a dressing room, but they had to perform their ablutions in a bucket in the yard. The third and fourth teams, however, had to be content with hanging their coats on the Cemetery wall.

Appleby Park became the venue for the team in 1887, and the site was later taken over and used by North Shields A.F.C. The field is now occupied by housing. Finally, the club moved in 1896 to a new venue on Preston Avenue, where they have been situated ever since.

In 1897 Percy Park saw one of their team mates George Carmichael "Tot" Robinson, selected for the England national rugby union team, the first international player to directly represent the club. He was followed by Peter Hardwick (England, 1902-1904) and Edward Scorfield (England 1910). Robinson not only played for England, but after retiring from playing the sport, became a selector for the Northumberland region, and in 1939 became president of the Rugby Football Union. During the turn of the century, Percy Park also hosted the invitational touring team the Barbarians on three occasions. Percy Park beat the Barbarians 3-5 on their first encounter, in 1895, but suffered loses in the two subsequent meetings in 1897 and 1900. In 1905 the Percy Park Ground hosted the New Zealand 'All Blacks' on their first tour of Great Britain, where they faced Northumberland.

During the inter-war period, Percy Park saw Carston Catcheside selected for the England team. A talented wing, Catcheside's debut in the 1924 Five Nations Championship, resulted in a record when he became the first England player to score a try in each of the four matches. 1924 also saw Bill Wallace become Percy Parks first and only player to represent the British Lions directly from the club. Although selected at county level for Northumberland, Wallace never represented England, though by playing in the First Test against South Africa on the 1924 tour, he became a capped Lion. Following the Second World War the club was financially stable and so in 1949 they purchased their ground for the sum of £3,000. Amongst the tributes was a memorial tablet, unveiled in memory of those players who had died in the conflict.

In 1955 a new clubhouse was built and was opened by the Duke of Northumberland. The same year, negotiations began to lease a second playing area on an area locally known as ‘Harbottles Field’. The 1960 Five Nations Championship saw Don Rutherford, Percy Park fullback, selected for the England team, and he would go on to become the club's most capped player. Although Rutherford switched to Gloucester in 1964, he was later selected for the British Lions on their 1966 tour.

A new concrete stand was built in 1983, replacing an earlier wooden framework which burned down, and further construction work in 1998 saw the building of a new clubhouse equipped with modern facilities.

Over the years which followed, various other modernisations and improvements have been carried out to the clubhouse and grounds.

== Club structure ==
Percy Park have three senior teams within the club.

- 1st Team
- 2nd Team (Lions)
- 3rd Team (Pumas)

Along with an academy team.

== Honours ==
- Northumberland Senior Cup winners (22): 1886, 1897, 1899, 1907, 1908, 1910, 1913, 1921, 1924, 1938, 1939, 1947, 1949, 1950, 1951, 1954, 1957, 1958, 2011, 2012, 2013, 2018
- Durham/Northumberland 2 champions: 1991–92
- Durham/Northumberland 1 champions (3): 1994–95, 2004–05, 2021-22
- Durham/Northumberland 1 v Yorkshire 1 promotion play-off winners: 2008–09
- North East 1 champions: 1997–98
- North 1 (east v west) promotion play-off winners: 2011–12
- Regional 2 North champions: 2023–24
