= 1901 Home Nations Championship =

International rugby union competition

- Date: 5 January – 16 March 1901
- Countries: England; Ireland; Scotland; Wales

Tournament statistics
- Champions: Scotland (4th title)
- Triple Crown: Scotland (3rd title)
- Matches played: 6
- Top point scorer(s): (Scotland) Gillespie (22)
- Top try scorer(s): (Scotland) Gillespie (4)

The 1901 Home Nations Championship was the nineteenth series of the rugby union Home Nations Championship. Six matches were played between 5 January and 16 March. It was contested by England, Ireland, Scotland and Wales.

Scotland won all their three games to take the championship for the fifth time outright (excluding two other titles shared with England) and complete the Triple Crown for the third time.

== Table ==
Pos	Team	Pld	W	D	L	PF	PA	PD	Pts
1	Scotland	3	3	0	0	45	16	+29	6
2	Wales	3	2	0	1	31	27	+4	4
3	Ireland	3	1	0	2	24	25	−1	2
4	England	3	0	0	3	9	41	−32	0

=== Scoring system ===
The matches for this season were decided on points scored. A try was worth three points, while converting a kicked goal from the try gave an additional two points. A dropped goal and a goal from mark were both worth four points. Penalty goals were worth three points.

== Matches ==
=== Wales vs. England ===
5 January 1901

Wales	13–0	England
Try: Hodges; Nicholls; Williams; Con: Bancroft (2)

Cardiff Arms Park, Cardiff
Referee: AJ Turnbull (Scotland)

Wales: Billy Bancroft (Swansea) capt., Llewellyn (Llwynypia), Gwyn Nicholls (Cardiff), George Davies (Swansea), Billy Trew (Swansea), Llewellyn Lloyd (Newport), Bala Jones (Aberavon), Bob Thomas (Swansea), Jere Blake (Cardiff), William Williams (Pontymister), Fred Miller (Mountain Ash), Alfred Brice (Aberavon), Jehoida Hodges (Newport), George Boots (Newport), Dick Hellings (Penygraig)

England: JW Sagar (Cambridge Uni), C Smith (Gloucester), EJ Vivyan (Devonport Albion), JT Taylor (West Hartlepool) capt., Edgar Elliot (Sunderland), Reggie Schwarz (Richmond), Ernest John "Katie" Walton (Oxford Uni), A O'Neill (Torquay Athletic), D Graham (Aspatria), CT Scott (Blackheath), AFC Luxmoore (Richmond), H Alexander (Birkenhead Park), NC Fletcher (OMT), COP Gibson (Northern), EW Roberts (RNEC Keyham)

=== Ireland vs. England ===
9 February 1901

Ireland	10–6	England
Try: Davidson; Gardiner; Con: Irwin (2)		Try: Robinson; Pen: Alexander

Lansdowne Road, Dublin
Referee: DG Findlay (Scotland)

Ireland: J Fulton (NIFC), AE Freear (Lansdowne), BRW Doran (Lansdowne), JB Allison (Queen's Uni, Belfast), IG Davidson (NIFC), Louis Magee (Bective Rangers) capt., A Barr (Methodist C. Belfast), AG Heron (Queen's Uni, Belfast), M Ryan (Rockwell College), Samuel Irwin (Queen's Uni, Belfast), CE Allen (Derry), P Healey (Limerick), TJ Little (Bective Rangers), F Gardiner (NIFC), J Ryan (Rockwell College)

England: JW Sagar (Cambridge Uni), GC Robinson (Percy Park), WL Bunting (Moseley) capt., JT Taylor (West Hartlepool), Edgar Elliot (Sunderland), Reggie Schwarz (Richmond), Ernest John "Katie" Walton (Oxford Uni), A O'Neill (Torquay Athletic), RD Wood (Liverpool OB), CT Scott (Blackheath), C Hall (Gloucester), H Alexander (Birkenhead Park), NC Fletcher (OMT), S Reynolds (Richmond), EW Roberts (RNEC Keyham)

=== Scotland vs. Wales ===
9 February 1901

Scotland	18–8	Wales
Try: Gillespie (2); Turnbull; Flett; Con: Gillespie (2); Flett		Try: Llewellyn Lloyd; Boots; Con Bancroft

Inverleith, Edinburgh
Referee: RW Jeffares (Ireland)

Scotland: AW Duncan (Edinburgh University), WH Welsh (Edinburgh Acads), AN Fell (Edinburgh University), Alec Boswell Timms (Edinburgh University), P Turnbull (Edinburgh Acads), FH Fasson (Edinburgh University), Jimmy Gillespie (Edinburgh Acads), J Ross (London Scottish), AB Flett (Edinburgh University), Alex Frew (Edinburgh University), David Bedell-Sivright (Cambridge Uni), Mark Coxon Morrison (Royal HSFP) capt., RS Stronarch (Glasgow Acads), John Dykes (Glasgow HFSP), JA Bell (Clydesdale)

Wales: Billy Bancroft (Swansea) capt., Llewellyn (Llwynypia), Gwyn Nicholls (Cardiff), George Davies (Swansea), Billy Trew (Swansea), Llewellyn Lloyd (Newport), Lou Phillips (Newport), Hopkin Davies (Swansea), Jere Blake (Cardiff), William Alexander (Llwynypia), Fred Miller (Mountain Ash), Alfred Brice (Aberavon), Jehoida Hodges (Newport), George Boots (Newport), Dick Hellings (Penygraig)

=== Scotland vs. Ireland ===
23 February 1901

Scotland	9–5	Ireland
Try: Gillespie; Welsh (2)		Try: Doran; Con: Sealy

Inverleith, Edinburgh
Referee: G Harnett (England)

Scotland: AW Duncan (Edinburgh University), WH Welsh (Edinburgh Acads), AN Fell (Edinburgh University), Alec Boswell Timms (Edinburgh University), P Turnbull (Edinburgh Acads), FH Fasson (Edinburgh University), Jimmy Gillespie (Edinburgh Acads), J Ross (London Scottish), AB Flett (Edinburgh University), Alex Frew (Edinburgh University), David Bedell-Sivright (Fettesian-Lorettonian), Mark Coxon Morrison (Royal HSFP) capt., FP Dods (Edinburgh Acads), John Dykes (Glasgow HSFP), JA Bell (Clydesdale)

Ireland: Cecil Boyd (Wanderers), AE Freear (Lansdowne), BRW Doran (Lansdowne), JB Allison (Queen's Uni, Belfast), IG Davidson (NIFC), Louis Magee (Bective Rangers) capt., A Barr (Methodist C. Belfast), Thomas Arnold Harvey (Dublin University), M Ryan (Rockwell College), HAS Irvine (Belfast Collegians), CE Allen (Derry), P Healey (Limerick), TJ Little (Bective Rangers), Tom McGown (NIFC), J Ryan (Rockwell College)

=== England vs. Scotland ===
9 March 1901

England	3–18	Scotland
Try: Robinson		Try: Gillespie; Welsh; Timms; Fell; Con Gillespie (3)

Rectory Field, Blackheath
Referee: RW Jeffares (Ireland)

England: HT Gamlin (Blackheath), GC Robinson (Percy Park), WL Bunting (Moseley) capt., NS Cox (Sunderland), Edgar Elliot (Sunderland), B Oughtred (Hartlepool Rovers), PD Kendall (Birkenhead Park), A O'Neill (Torquay Athletic), George Ralph Gibson (Northern), HTF Weston (Northampton), C Hall (Gloucester), H Alexander (Birkenhead Park), NC Fletcher (OMT), CS Edgar (Birkenhead Park), Bernard Charles Hartley (Blackheath)

Scotland: AW Duncan (Edinburgh University), WH Welsh (Edinburgh Acads), AN Fell (Edinburgh University), Alec Boswell Timms (Edinburgh University), P Turnbull (Edinburgh Acads), RM Neill (Edinburgh Acads), Jimmy Gillespie (Edinburgh Acads), J Ross (London Scottish), AB Flett (Edinburgh University), Alex Frew (Edinburgh University), David Bedell-Sivright (Fettesian-Lorettonian), Mark Coxon Morrison (Royal HSFP) capt., RS Stronarch (Glasgow Acads), John Dykes (Glasgow HFSP), JA Bell (Clydesdale)

=== Wales vs. Ireland ===
16 March 1901

Wales	10–9	Ireland
Try: Alexander (2); Con Bancroft (2)		Try: Jim Ryan; Freear; Davidson

St. Helen's, Swansea
Referee: AJ Turnbull (Scotland)

Wales: Billy Bancroft (Swansea) capt., Llewellyn (Llwynypia), Gwyn Nicholls (Cardiff), George Davies (Swansea), Rhys Gabe (Llanelli), Dicky Owen (Swansea), Dick Jones (Swansea), Hopkin Davies (Swansea), Jere Blake (Cardiff), William Alexander (Llwynypia), Fred Miller (Mountain Ash), Alfred Brice (Aberavon), Bob Jones (Llwynypia), George Boots (Newport), Fred Scrine (Swansea)

Ireland: Cecil Boyd (Wanderers), AE Freear (Lansdowne), BRW Doran (Lansdowne), JB Allison (Queen's Uni, Belfast), IG Davidson (NIFC), Louis Magee (Bective Rangers) capt., HH Ferris (Queen's Uni, Belfast), Thomas Arnold Harvey (Dublin University), M Ryan (Rockwell College), Samuel Irwin (Queen's Uni, Belfast), CE Allen (Derry), P Healey (Limerick), JJ Coffey (Lansdowne), F Gardiner (NIFC), J Ryan (Rockwell College)

== Bibliography ==
- Godwin, Terry (1984). The International Rugby Championship 1883–1983. London: Willows Books. ISBN 0-00-218060-X.
- Griffiths, John (1987). The Phoenix Book of International Rugby Records. London: Phoenix House. ISBN 0-460-07003-7.
