= 1900–01 Rugby Union County Championship =

English rugby union competition

1900–01 County Championship
- Countries: England
- Champions: Devon (2nd title)
- Runners-up: Durham

The 1900–01 Rugby Union County Championship was the 13th edition of England's premier rugby union club competition at the time.

Devon won the competition for the second time defeating Durham in the final.

== Final ==
30 March 1901

Durham	3–14	Devon
Try: Cox		Try: Nicholas, Vivyan (2), Roberts; Con: Vivyan

Victoria Park (Hartlepool)

J Hegg	West Hartlepool
W Taylor (capt)	Tudhoe
Norman Cox	Sunderland
Jack Taylor	West Hartlepool
E W Elliott	Sunderland
H Gibbon	Hamsteels
Bernard Oughtred	Hartlepool Rovers
A Stephenson	Tudhoe
J Frater	Tudhoe
J Carmidy	Tudhoe
S Simms	West Hartlepool
G H Lewis	West Hartlepool
J Waller	West Hartlepool
George Summerscalee	Durham City
W J Smith	Hartlepool Old Boys

G Fleet	Torquay Athletic
A J Richards	Barnstaple
Elliott Vivyan	Devonport Albion
T Mills	Plymouth
W Duffin	Devonport Albion
S Hurrell	Devonport Albion
Charlie Thomas (capt)	Barnstaple
A O'Neill	Torquay Athletic
D Hellings	Llwynypia
Leonard Tosswill	Exeter
W Spiers	Devonport Albion
Philip Nicholas	Exeter
W Bulley	Devonport Albion
Denys Dobson	Newton Abbot
W Dobson	Newton Abbot

== See also ==
- English rugby union system
- Rugby union in England
