= 1901–02 Rugby Union County Championship =

English rugby union competition

1901–02 County Championship
- Countries: England
- Champions: Durham (2nd title)
- Runners-up: Gloucestershire

The 1901–02 Rugby Union County Championship was the 14th edition of England's premier rugby union club competition at the time.

Durham won the competition for the second time defeating Gloucestershire in the final.

== Final ==
5 April 1902

Gloucestershire	3–9	Durham
Try: Watkins-Baker		Try: Joicey; Con: Taylor; Goal from mark: Taylor

Kingsholm Stadium, Gloucester
Attendance: 6,000

George Romans	Gloucester
Gwyn Nicholls	Newport
L Smith	Gloucester
E Watkins-Baker	Bristol
Charles Smith	Gloucester
Dicky Goddard	Gloucester
S H Foster	Bristol
W Claridge	Bristol
J Lewis	Bristol
J Sweet	Bristol
M Courtenay	Bristol
C E Miller	Richmond
F M Stout	Richmond
Charles Hall (capt)	Gloucester
F Westbury	Gloucester

Bob Poole	Hartlepool Old Boys
N S A Harrison	Hartlepool Rovers
Jack Taylor	West Hartlepool
J Gordon	Hamsteels
Norman Cox	Sunderland
Bernard Oughtred	Hartlepool Rovers
E J Joicey	North Durham
G R Lewes	West Hartlepool
H Emerson	West Hartlepool
J Waller	West Hartlepool
Bob Bradley	West Hartlepool
Jim Auton	Hartlepool Rovers
T Summerscales	Durham City
J Carmidy	Hartlepool Old Boys
W J Smith	Hartlepool Old Boys

== See also ==
- English rugby union system
- Rugby union in England
