= Arthur O'Neill (disambiguation) =

Arthur O'Neill (1876–1914) was an Irish Unionist politician.

Arthur O'Neill or Art O'Neill may refer to:

- Blessed Arthur O'Neilly (died 1282), Irish born Trinitarian priest who was captured by slavers in Egypt and martyred
- Art Oge O'Neill (died 1519), head of the O'Neill dynasty
- Arthur O'Neill (soldier) (died 1600), Gaelic Irish landowner
- Art MacBaron O'Neill (died 1618), Gaelic Irish landowner
- Arturo O'Neill (1736–1814), Irish-born Spanish soldier
- Arthur O'Neill (harpist) (1737–1816), Irish musician
- Arthur Joseph O'Neill (1917–2013), American bishop of the Roman Catholic Church
- Arthur O'Neill (rugby union), English international rugby union player
