= Thomas Collins =

Thomas Collins may refer to:

- Thomas Collins (governor) (1732–1789), American lawyer and governor of Delaware
- Thomas Collins (pirate) (died 1719), English pirate active in the Indian Ocean
- Thomas Collins (British politician) (died 1884), Member of Parliament for Knaresborough and Boston
- Thomas Collins (bishop of Meath) (1873–1927), Irish Anglican bishop
- Thomas Collins (Australian politician) (1884–1945), Australian MP and postmaster-general
- Thomas Collins (Arizona politician), American politician
- Thomas Patrick Collins (1915–1973), American-born Catholic bishop in Bolivia
- Thomas H. Collins (born 1946), retired commandant of the United States Coast Guard
- Thomas Collins (cardinal) (born 1947), Canadian Roman Catholic cardinal
- Thomas Collins (cricketer, born 1895) (1895–1964), English cricketer
- Thomas Collins (cricketer, born 1841) (1841–1934), English cricketer
- Thomas D. Collins (1847–1935), American soldier who fought in the American Civil War
- Tom Collins (rugby, born 1895) (Thomas John Collins, 1895–1957), rugby union and rugby league footballer of the 1920s for Wales (RU), Mountain Ash, and Hull (RL)
- Thomas LeRoy Collins (1909–1991), governor of Florida
- Thomas Collins (soldier), participant in the Battle of Rorke's Drift
- Thomas Collins (poet), English poet
- T. J. Collins (1844–1925), American architect

== See also ==
- Tom Collins (disambiguation)
- Tommy Collins (disambiguation)
- Collins (surname)
