= Bob Jones (rugby union) =

Wales international rugby union player (1875-1944)

Robert Jones
- Born: Robert Jones; 30 August 1875 Pontypridd, Glamorgan, Wales
- Died: 21 September 1944 (aged 69) Trelewis, Glamorgan, Wales
- Occupation: Police officer

Rugby union career
- Position: Forward
Amateur team(s)
Years	Team	Apps	(Points)
- Llwynypia RFC
- Cardiff RFC
1897-?	Glamorgan Police RFC		
International career
Years	Team	Apps	(Points)
1901	Wales	1	(0)

Robert Jones (30 August 1875 – 21 September 1944) was a Welsh rugby union forward who played club rugby for Llwynypia and Cardiff and international rugby for Wales.

== Rugby career ==
Jones made his first appearance for Wales while representing Rhondda club, Llwynypia. Llwynypia, although unfashionable had provided several players to the Wales international team over the previous five years. Jones gained his one and only international cap when he was selected for the final game of the 1901 Home Nations Championship, where he was brought into the pack as a temporary replacement for Jehoida Hodges. The match was played at Swansea's St. Helen's Ground against Ireland, and Jones took his place in the squad with fellow Llwynypia team-mates William Alexander and Willie Llewellyn. Despite the Welsh scoring less tries than Ireland, Wales captain Billy Bancroft ensured victory by converting both tries, whereas Ireland missed all three of theirs. The next season saw the return off Hodges, and Jones did not represent Wales again.

In his later career, Jones played for top flight Welsh club, Cardiff. As an officer in the Glamorgan Constabulary he also represented Glamorgan Police on the rugby field.

=== International matches played for Wales ===
Wales

- Ireland 1901

== Bibliography ==
- Godwin, Terry (1984). The International Rugby Championship 1883-1983. London: Willows Books. ISBN 0-00-218060-X.
- Griffiths, John (1987). The Phoenix Book of International Rugby Records. London: Phoenix House. ISBN 0-460-07003-7.
- Smith, David; Williams, Gareth (1980). Fields of Praise: The Official History of The Welsh Rugby Union. Cardiff: University of Wales Press. ISBN 0-7083-0766-3.
