= Mark Lewis =

Mark Lewis may refer to:

== Entertainment ==
- Mark Lewis (artist) (born 1958), Canadian artist and film-maker
- Mark Lewis (storyteller) (1954–2014), American storyteller
- Mark Lewis (filmmaker) (born 1958), Australian documentary film and television producer
- Mark Lewis (music producer), American hard rock/heavy metal music producer

== Sports ==
- Mark Lewis (rugby union) (1889–1968), Wales international rugby player
- Mark Lewis (tennis) (born 1961), New Zealand tennis player
- Mark Lewis (tight end) (born 1961), National Football League tight end
- Mark Lewis (baseball) (born 1969), infielder in Major League Baseball
- Mark Lewis (kicker) (born 1979), Arena Football League placekicker
- Mark Lewis (beach volleyball) (born 1980), Jamaican beach volleyball player
- Mark Lewis (announcer), public address announcer for the National Hockey League's Edmonton Oilers
- Mark Lewis (cricketer) (born 1987), English cricketer

== Other ==
- Mark Lewis (politician) (born 1957), Australian politician
- Mark Edward Lewis (born 1954), American historian of ancient China
- Mark J. Lewis (born 1962), Chief Scientist of the U.S. Air Force
- Mark A. Lewis (born 1962), Canadian mathematician and biologist
- Mark E. Lewis (engineer), American industrial engineer

== See also ==
- Marc Lewis (born 1951), Canadian psychologist, neuroscientist, and author
