= Ernest Roberts =

Ernest Roberts may refer to:

- Ernest Roberts (Australian politician) (1868–1913), Australian politician
- Ernie Roberts (1912–1994), British Labour Party member of parliament
- Ernest Roberts (Conservative politician) (1890–1969), British Conservative member of parliament for Flintshire
- Ernest W. Roberts (1858–1924), U.S. representative from Massachusetts
- Ernest Roberts (Royal Navy officer) (1878–1933), England rugby union international
- Ernest Stewart Roberts (1847–1912), classicist and academic administrator
