= Charles Edgar =

Charles Edgar may refer to:

- Chip Edgar, American Anglican bishop
- Charles Edgar (rugby union), English rugby union player
