= William Evans (rugby union, born 1892) =

Wales international rugby union footballer

- Born: William Henry Evans; 9 February 1892 Tonypandy, Wales
- Died: 1979 (aged 86–87) Bryncethin, Wales

Rugby union career
- Position: Centre
Amateur team(s)
Years	Team	Apps	(Points)
- Llwynypia RFC
–	Penygraig RFC		
International career
Years	Team	Apps	(Points)
1914	Wales	4	(3)

William Henry Evans (9 February 1892 - c. 1979) was a Welsh international centre who played club rugby for Llwynypia and Penygraig. He won four caps for Wales playing in all four matches of the 1914 Five Nations Championship.

== Personal history ==
Evans was born in 1892 in Tonypandy in the Rhondda Valley during its period of industrial growth. He became a collier, a common occupation in the coal rich valley. With the outbreak of the First World War he served his country as a member of the Welch Regiment. He died circa 1979 in Bryncethin.

== Rugby career ==
Evans first came to prominence as a rugby player while he was playing for local team Llwynypia RFC. He was first capped for Wales when he was selected for the opening game of the 1914 Five Nations Championship, an away fixture at Twickenham against England. Evans was one of five new players brought into the Welsh side as the team attempted to rebuild their side, which saw Wales lose to their old rivals, 10-9. Evans earned his second cap three weeks later, laying Scotland at the Cardiff Arms Park. In a rough match Scotland lost by a heavy 24-5 result. Evans' third successive Wales appearance was a second home encounter, this time against France. Wales dominated the game and Evans scored his first and only international try, one of seven scored by Wales that day, in a convincing 31-0 victory. His final international appearance was the last of the 1914 Championship and the last international Welsh game until 1920, as the outbreak of the First World War ended international rugby. Evans; final game was seen as one of the most violent in the history of rugby, with Wales beating Ireland 11-3.

=== International matches played ===
Wales

- England 1914
- France 1914
- Ireland 1914
- Scotland 1914

== Bibliography ==
- Godwin, Terry (1984). The International Rugby Championship 1883-1983. London: Willow Books. ISBN 000218060X.
- Jenkins, John M.; Pierce, Duncan; Auty, Timothy (1991). Who's Who of Welsh International Rugby Players. Wrexham: Bridge Books. ISBN 1-872424-10-4.
- Smith, David; Williams, Gareth (1980). Fields of Praise: The Official History of The Welsh Rugby Union. Cardiff: University of Wales Press. ISBN 0-7083-0766-3.
