= Camrose =

Camrose may refer to:

== People ==
- Viscount Camrose

== Locations ==
- Camrose, Alberta, Canada
- Camrose, Pembrokeshire, Wales
- Camrose (federal electoral district), former electoral district in Canada (1925 to 1953)
- Camrose (provincial electoral district), provincial electoral district in Canada
- Camrose County, Alberta, Canada

== Other ==
- Camrose Trophy, awarded in contract bridge
