= Dick Thomas (rugby union) =

Welsh rugby union player (1880–1916)

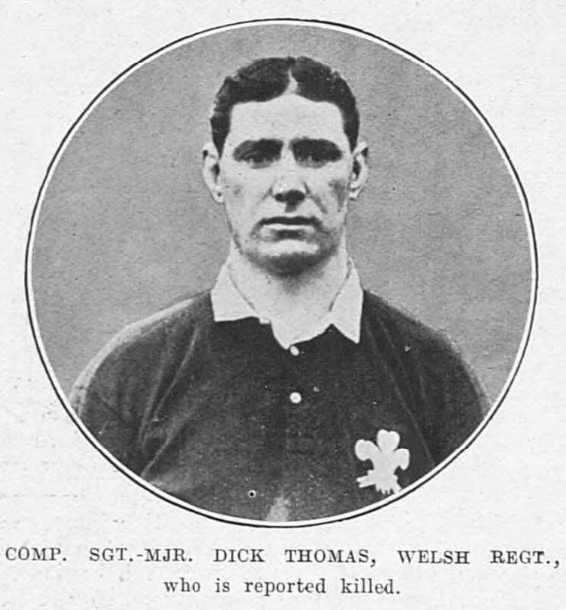
- Born: Edward John Richard Thomas; 14 October 1880 Blaenllechau, Rhondda
- Died: 7 July 1916 (aged 35) Mametz, France
- School: Ferndale Board School

Rugby union career
- Position: Back
Amateur team(s)
Years	Team	Apps	(Points)
- Ferndale RFC
–	Penygraig RFC		
–	Bridgend RFC		
–	Mountain Ash RFC		
–	Glamorgan Police RFC		
Provincial / State sides
Years	Team	Apps	(Points)
1904-1914	Glamorgan County	20	
International career
Years	Team	Apps	(Points)
1906-1909	Wales	4	(0)
- Military career
- Allegiance: United Kingdom
- Branch: British Army
- Rank: Company Sergeant Major
- Unit: 16th Bn Welsh Regiment
- Conflicts: Battle of the Somme
- Memorials: Thiepval Memorial

Edward John Richard Thomas (14 October 1880 – 7 July 1916) was a Welsh international rugby union back who played club rugby for Mountain Ash.

== Early life ==
He was educated at Ferndale Board School, Glamorganshire. He joined the Glamorganshire Constabulary in November 1904, and was posted to Mountain Ash, remaining there until the start of the First World War.

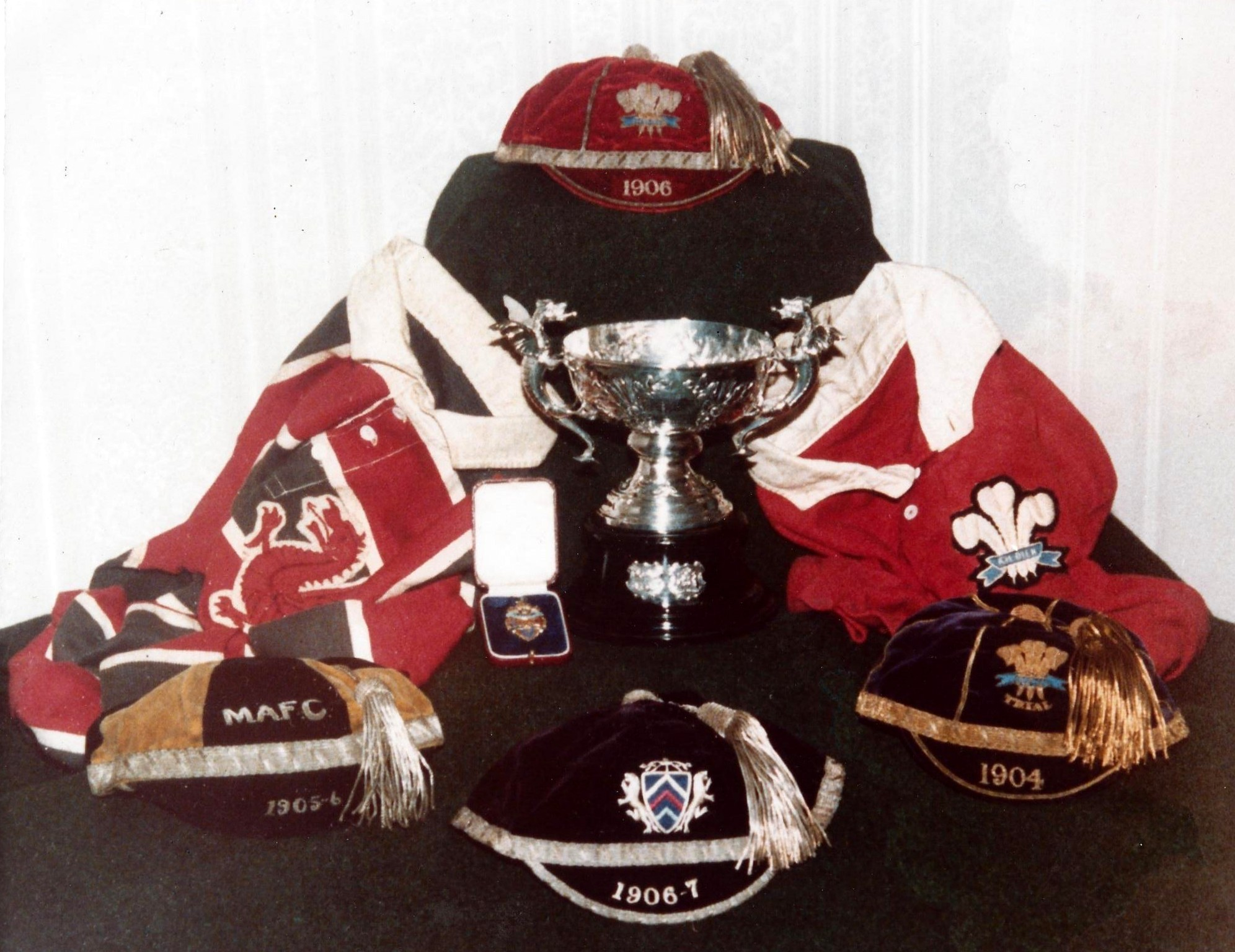

== Rugby career ==
Thomas first played rugby for local Rhondda clubs, Ferndale and Penygraig before moving to Mountain Ash, the team he would captain during the 1904/05 season. He faced his first international opposition when he was chosen to represent Glamorgan, an invitational county team that faced the touring South Africans in 1906. Glamorgan played well but lost 6-3 though if Bert Winfield had completed his kicks the Welsh would have won. Thomas would gain his first cap later that year, when a Welsh team was formed to face the same South African team. Thomas, along with the other newly capped players, John Dyke and John Jenkins were judged not to show great ability, but were far superior to the other non-capped players available. Wales lost the game, which saw the end of many great Welsh players.

From 1906 to 1907, Thomas was incapacitated due to appendicitis, but he returned to first-class rugby after his appendix was removed.

Unlike Dyke and Jenkins, Thomas was reselected for his country again, but he needed to wait until the 1908 Home Nations Championship, when he was chosen to face France at the Cardiff Arms Park. Under the captaincy of Teddy Morgan Wales were victorious, as they were two weeks later when Thomas won his third cap against Ireland in Belfast. Thomas's last game was the following year in a match against Scotland. Billy Trew not only led the team but scored the winning try which Jack Bancroft converted.

=== International appearances ===
Opposition	Score	Result	Date	Venue	Ref(s)
South Africa	0–11	Lost	1 December 1906	Swansea	
France	36–4	Win	2 March 1908	Cardiff	
Ireland	5–11	Win	14 March 1908	Belfast	
Scotland	3–5	Win	6 February 1909	Inverleith	

== Military service ==
At the start of the First World War, Thomas was in the Welsh constabulary, and was unable to stand down from his police duties and until 16 January 1915, when he enlisted in the 16th Battalion Welsh Regiment. He was in training with his regiment at Colwyn Bay until August, being rapidly promoted, in the meantime, to Company Sergeant Major by March. The Welsh Division was deployed to the Western Front in December 1915. He was killed in action, shot through the head, in the taking of Mametz Wood on 7 July 1916.

He is commemorated at the Thiepval Memorial to the Missing of the Somme. Another Welsh international died in the same military action, winger Johnny Williams.

== See also ==
- List of international rugby union players killed in World War I
