= Glamorgan Police RFC =

Welsh former rugby union club

(Wales) Glamorgan Police RFC
- Full name: Glamorgan Police Rugby Football Club
- Founded: 1892; 134 years ago
- Disbanded: 1969; 57 years ago
- League: Defunct

Glamorgan Police RFC was a Welsh rugby union team that served the Glamorgan Police force before the amalgamation of the four district police forces of South Wales in 1969. The team was the most notable of the four early police rugby teams of Wales, supplying several notable players to the Wales national team.

== History ==
The first police teams in Glamorgan played each other in 1892 at Llwynypia, when Rhondda Police and Cardiff Borough Police. This match was followed by the creation of the Canton Divisional Police team, led by Captain Lionel Lindsay, the Chief Constable of the Glamorgan force. The Canton Divisional team comprised the forces from Vale of Glamorgan, Barry, Penarth and Cardiff districts, and their most notable player was Dai Evans, who as well as representing the police he also turned out for Penygraig RFC. In 1896 Evans was capped, becoming the first international player from the Canton Divisional side.

In 1897 the Glamorgan Police RFC was founded, with Lindsay as chairman. William Rees was made captain and Dai Evans was made vice-captain. At the end of the 1897 season, three new international players joined the club, William Alexander of Glynneath, Bob Jones of Llwynypia and Alfred Brice of Aberavon.

== Wales internationals ==
See also Category:Glamorgan Police RFC players

- (Wales) Dai Evans
- (Wales) Will Osborne

== Bibliography ==
- Westcott, Gordon (1992). A Century on the Rugby Beat. The South Wales Police Rugby Football Club.
