= Tom Collins (disambiguation) =

A Tom Collins is an alcoholic cocktail made with gin and other mixers.

Tom Collins may also refer to:

- Joseph Furphy (1843–1912), Australian author who mostly wrote under the pseudonym Tom Collins
- Tom Collins (athlete), Irish athlete who held the 5 mile world's record
- Tom Collins (Rent character), character in the rock musical Rent
- Tom Collins (rugby, born 1895) (1895–1957), rugby union and rugby league footballer of the 1920s for Wales (RU), Mountain Ash, and Hull (RL)
- Tom Francis Collins (1886–1907), convicted murderer
- Tom Collins (footballer) (1882–1929), Scottish international footballer who played for Heart of Midlothian, Bathgate, East Fife and Tottenham Hotspur
- Tom Collins (dual player) (?–2008), dual player from County Kerry, Ireland
- Tom Collins (boxer) (born 1955), British boxer
- Tom Collins (record producer) (born 1942), American country music producer of Ronnie Milsap, Barbara Mandrell, & others
- Tom Collins (rugby union, born 1994), English rugby union player
- Tom Collins (politician), British Labour Party MP
- Tom Collins, producer of the ice show Champions on Ice
- Tom Collins, bass player of the band Acroma

== See also ==
- Thomas Collins (disambiguation)
- Tommy Collins (disambiguation)
- Collins (surname)
