= Tom Williams (rugby union, born 1859) =

Wales international rugby union footballer (1859-1913)

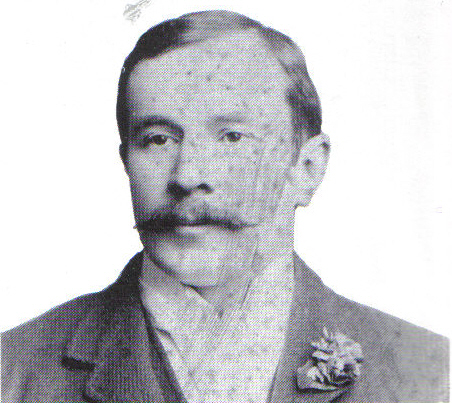
- Born: Thomas Williams; 9 October 1859 Llwynypia, Wales
- Died: 4 February 1913 (aged 53) Llwynypia, Wales
- Notable relative(s): Willie Llewellyn, nephew
- Occupation: solicitor

Rugby union career
- Position: Forward
Amateur team(s)
Years	Team	Apps	(Points)
1880-1888	Cardiff RFC		
–	Pontypridd RFC		
–	Llwynypia RFC		
International career
Years	Team	Apps	(Points)
1882	Wales	1	(0)

Thomas Williams (9 October 1859 – 4 February 1913) was a Welsh rugby union forward who played club rugby for Cardiff and Pontypridd and international rugby for Wales. A solicitor by profession, Williams would later become a national selector for the Welsh Rugby Union. Williams was also responsible for suggesting the singing of the Welsh national anthem in a match in 1905, the first time a national anthem was sung before a sporting event.

Williams was born in Llwynypia into a farming community in the Rhondda Valley and in his early years he lived in at the Tonypandy Inn. A solicitor by trade, he trained for his profession in Pontypridd, probably under Spicketts. Williams was the uncle of Wales international and British Lion Willie Llewellyn.

== Rugby playing career ==
Williams had a career in most levels of Welsh rugby union. He first came to note as a player, representing first class club Cardiff. In 1881, Williams was part of the Cardiff team which beat Llanelli in the South Wales Challenge Cup at Neath. The following year, Williams had switched to Pontypridd, and it was while with Pontypridd that he was selected for his one and only Welsh international cap. Wales had only played one international prior to 1882, a humiliating defeat to England at Blackheath. Williams was brought into a much changed pack to face Ireland, the first meeting between the two countries in a rugby union match. The Irish team were poor, and Wales earned their very first international victory, winning by two goals to nil. Although victorious, Williams was one of two players to be replaced for the next game, along with Hugh Vincent.

After his international career, Williams returned to Cardiff Rugby Club. In 1884, while playing for Cardiff, Williams fell ill, and was replaced by Frank Hancock. On Williams recovery, the Cardiff club could not choose between Williams, their fastest threequarter, and Hancock, who had played to an impressive standard during his short run. Cardiff decided to play both, dropping a player from the pack to accommodate four threequarters, rather than the traditional three, changing the formation of their rugby team. This formation was trialed by Wales, with Hancock as captain in 1886, and adopted by the international side in 1888, before becoming a worldwide tactic that continues to this day.

=== International matches played ===
Wales

- Ireland 1882

== Rugby administrator ==
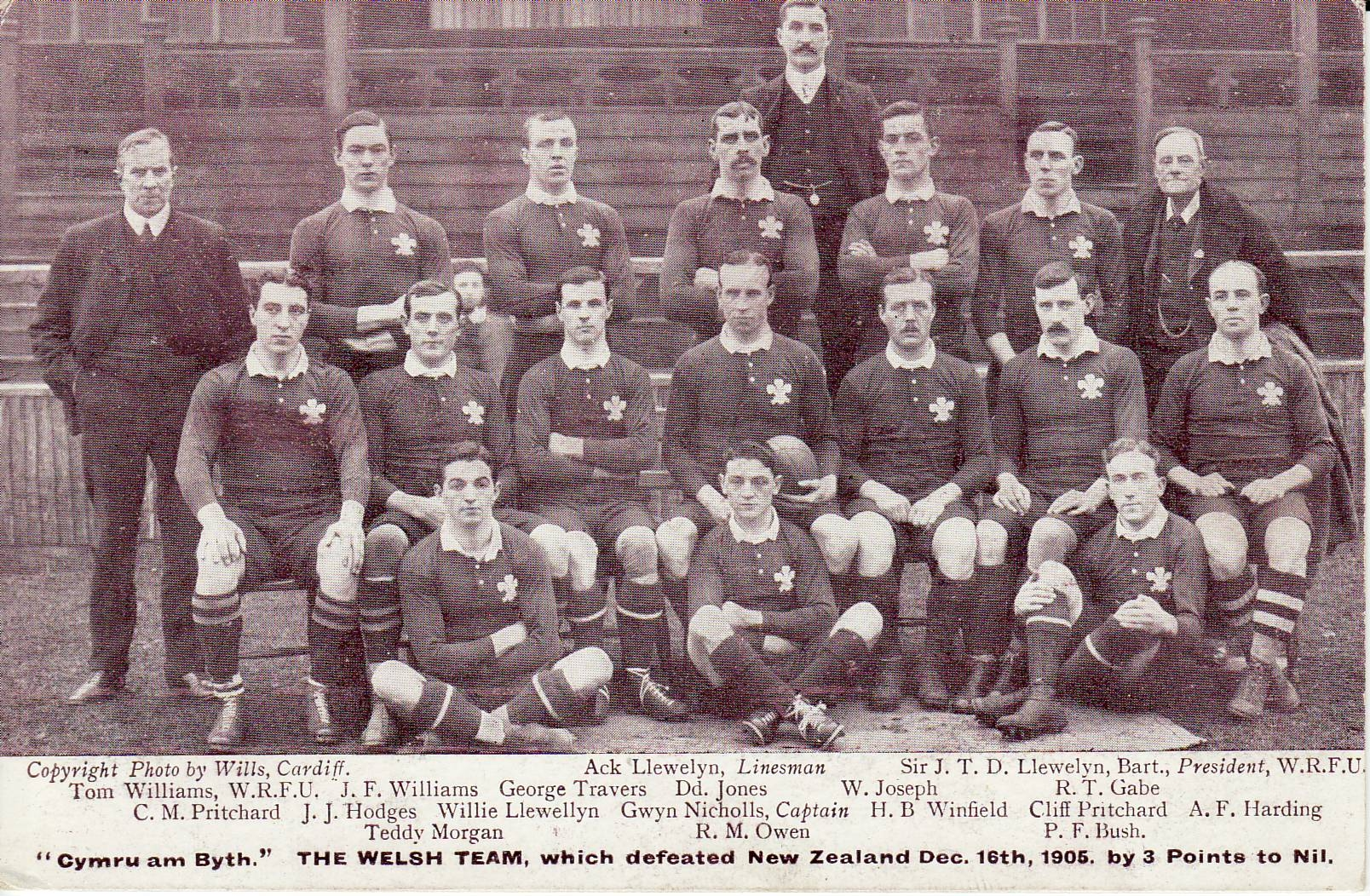
1905 Wales squad that beat the All Blacks, Williams is stood far left in suit

After his playing career had ended, Williams became heavily involved in the Welsh Rugby Union, the governing body of rugby in Wales. Williams had a background suited to the running and administration of sporting organisations, being one of the founders of Llwynypia RFC in 1891. Then at a lower level he became Secretary of the "Rhondda, Ferndale and Aberdare league", later to become the Glamorgan League. He took up a position as an administrator for the Mid-District area within the WRU, a role he would occupy from 1899 to 1910, before being made a life vice president. Williams was made a national selector in 1901, a role he held until 1908, and was seen as the most influential Welsh selectors of the day.

When Wales hosted the first touring New Zealand team in 1905, Williams was at the centre of the selection of the Welsh team that would become the only team to beat the All Blacks during their tour. One of William's most notable ideas was not through his match selection, but his suggestion that the Welsh team respond to the New Zealand Haka by singing 'Hen Wlad Fy Nhadau', the Welsh national anthem. This idea was supported by the Welsh newspaper, the Western Mail, which suggested that the Welsh supporters could join in the chorus. On the day, after observing the Haka, Teddy Morgan led the Welsh team in singing the national anthem, which was quickly picked up by the crowd. It was the first time a national anthem had been sung before a sporting event. Later in his career, Williams became one of the Welsh representatives for the International Rugby Board, the sports international governing body.

== Rugby referee ==
As well as being one of Wales' top sporting administrators, Williams was also a rugby union referee. He umpired a single international match, the 1904 encounter between England and Ireland in the Home Nations Championship, played at the Rectory Field in Blackheath. He also refereed at least three Barbarian matches during the invitational clubs tours of South Wales.

== Bibliography ==
- Griffiths, John (1987). The Phoenix Book of International Rugby Records. London: Phoenix House. ISBN 0-460-07003-7.
- Harris, Gareth; Evans, Alan (1997). Pontypridd RFC, The Early Years. Rugby Unlimited. ISBN 0-9531714-0-X.
- Jones, Stephen; Paul Beken (1985). Dragon in Exile, The Centenary History of London Welsh R.F.C. London: Springwood Books. ISBN 0-86254-125-5.
- Smith, David; Williams, Gareth (1980). Fields of Praise: The Official History of The Welsh Rugby Union. Cardiff: University of Wales Press. ISBN 0-7083-0766-3.
