= Tommy Collins =

Tommy Collins may refer to:

- Tommy Collins (filmmaker) (died 2022), Irish filmmaker
- Tommy Collins (singer) (1930–2000), American country music singer and songwriter

== See also ==
- Thomas Collins (disambiguation)
- Tom Collins (disambiguation)
