= Fred Miller (rugby) =

Wales international rugby union & league footballer

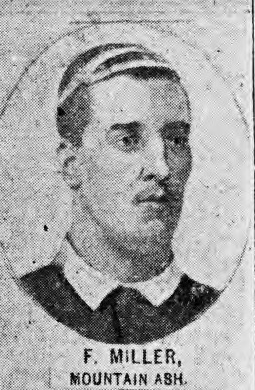
- Sketch of Miller from 1898
- Born: Fred Miller; 12 August 1869 Talybont-on-Usk, Wales
- Died: 18 March 1935 (aged 65) Abercynon, Wales
- Height: 1.83 m (6 ft 0 in)
- Weight: 89 kg (14 st 0 lb)
- Occupation: Collier

Rugby union career
- Position: Forward
Amateur team(s)
Years	Team	Apps	(Points)
–	Mountain Ash RFC		
International career
Years	Team	Apps	(Points)
1896–1901	Wales	7	(0)
- Rugby league career

Playing information
- Position: Forward
Club
Years	Team	Pld	T	G	FG	P
1901–04	Hull FC

Fred Miller (1869 – 1935) was a Welsh international rugby union forward who played club rugby for Mountain Ash; and was the first player to represent an international team whilst at the club when he was selected for Wales in 1896. Miller later 'Went North', joining professional rugby league team Hull FC.

Miller was a collier by trade, working at Nixon's Navigation Colliery in Mountain Ash, and was described as a stalwart specimen of the Welsh collier.

== Rugby career ==
Miller was first selected to play for Wales while representing Mountain Ash at club level. He was chosen for the final game of the 1896 Home Nations Championship, against Ireland; one of only two new caps to be brought into the Welsh team along with Llewellyn Lloyd. Wales lost the game due to the Irish overcoming the Welsh kick-and-rush tactics employed by the forwards, and the next game Miller was replaced by Jack Rhapps.

Miller found himself out of favour with the Welsh selectors until he was recalled four years later for the 1900 Championship replacing Llanelli's David Daniel. This was the beginning of the First Golden Age of Welsh rugby, and Miller was part of the team that won all three of the 1900 Championship games to lift the Triple Crown. Miller played in all three matches, and did enough to secure his reselection for the entire 1901 Home Nations Championship. Wales won the opener against England and the final game to Ireland, but were outclassed against Scotland at Inverleith. Miller was replaced in the 1902 tournament by Arthur Harding.

=== International matches played ===
Wales

- England 1900, 1901
- Scotland 1900, 1901
- Ireland 1896, 1900, 1901

== Bibliography ==
- Godwin, Terry (1984). The International Rugby Championship 1883-1983. Grafton Street, London: Willow Books. ISBN 0-00-218060-X.
- Griffiths, John (1987). The Phoenix Book of International Rugby Records. London: Phoenix House. ISBN 0-460-07003-7.
- Smith, David; Williams, Gareth (1980). Fields of Praise: The Official History of The Welsh Rugby Union. Cardiff: University of Wales Press. ISBN 0-7083-0766-3.
