= John Warburton Sagar =

England international rugby union player & diplomat

- Born: John Warburton Sagar; 6 December 1878 Easington, County Durham, England
- Died: 10 January 1941 (aged 62) Bournemouth, England
- University: Jesus College, Cambridge

Rugby union career
- Position: Fullback
Amateur team(s)
Years	Team	Apps	(Points)
- Cambridge University R.U.F.C.
–	Barbarian F.C.		
–	Castleford RFC		
–	Wakefield RFC		
International career
Years	Team	Apps	(Points)
1901	England	2	(0)

John Warburton Sagar (6 December 1878 – 10 January 1941) was a former England international rugby union fullback and British diplomat in the Sudan.

== Life history ==
Sagar was born in County Durham in 1878 and was educated at Durham School.

In 1898 he gained entry to Jesus College, Cambridge and was awarded his degree in 1901. On leaving university he became a private tutor in Yorkshire, before leaving to accompany a friend on a voyage around the world.

On his return in 1902 he joined Loretto School in Scotland as an assistant master. In 1903 he joined the Sudan Political Service, remaining with the service until 1924. He gained several promotions during his time in Sudan, becoming the Governor of Kordofan from 1917 to 1922, and the Governor of Wadi Halfa from 1922 until he left the service in 1924.

Sagar died of myocardial degeneration in Bournemouth, England in 1941.

== Rugby career ==
While at Jesus College, Sagar played for Cambridge University and in 1899 and 1900, played in The Varsity Match against Oxford winning two sporting Blues.

He played twice for England in the 1901 Home International championships.

He was the first captain of the newly formed Wakefield RFC in September 1901, the chairmen William Ticken Smith "had great pleasure in proposing that Mr Sagar be appointed captain, observing that they all knew his capacities as an International, Varsity and Yorkshire County player".

== Sources ==
- Wakefield Rugby Football Club—1901-2001 A Centenary History. Written and compiled by David Ingall in 2001.
- A biographical dictionary of the Sudan By Richard Leslie Hill. Page 324. ISBN 978-0-7146-1037-5
