= Llwynypia RFC =

Welsh rugby union club, based in Llwynypia

(Wales) Llwynypia RFC
- Full name: Llwynypia Rugby Football Club
- Founded: 1891; 135 years ago
- Disbanded: 1930s
- Location: Llwynypia, Wales
- League: Defunct

Llwynypia RFC was a rugby union club located in the Welsh village of Llwynypia in the Rhondda. The team provided several international players during the late 19th and early 20th centuries, most notably Willie Llewellyn, who was not only selected to represent Wales while playing at the club, but later played for the British Isles on their 1904 tour of Australia and New Zealand.

== History ==
Llwynypia RFC was founded in 1891, one of several Rhondda teams to emerge with the industrialisation of the valleys, when the mining of the coalfields led to a mass influx of economic immigrants. Llwynypia may have been formed before 1891 as there is evidence of a Llwynypia team being played in the early 1880s. The first mention is a match between Ystrad and a joint Tonypandy and Llwynpia team played on 30/11/1882. The next mention is of a match between Llwynpia and Mountain Ash, played on 01/03/1883. In the early 1890s Llwynypia, along with other local clubs, such as Treorchy, Ferndale and Penygraig, were represented in the newly formed Welsh Rugby Union. By 1895 the Welsh selectors began re-evaluating the needs of the Welsh pack, and began looking for a more physical style of player. These players would be able to jump and scrummage, but would also be able to take and hand out rough play. This forward player was found in the valley clubs, strong colliers who would be dubbed the 'Rhondda forward'. The new breed of forward were first represented in 1896 by Treorchy's Sam Ramsey and Penygraig's Dai Evans, but in 1897 Dick Hellings became the first player from Llwynypia Rugby Club to represent his country. The following match, against Ireland, he was joined by the club's second representative William Alexander.

These were the glory years of success for Llwynypia, during the 1895-96 season, supported by both Hellings and Alexander, they promised much, defeating several top flight opponents. The next season they finished undefeated, a feat normally only achieved by first class teams such as Newport and Cardiff. As the club gained in influence, the team began to attract talent from other clubs; which included Llanelli's three times capped Jack Evans. Llwynypia's backs were described as 'speedy and well drilled', which was typified by the emergence in the early 1900s by Willie Llewellyn, a seventeen-year-old out of Christ College, Brecon. In 1901 Llwynpyia provided three players to the Wales team that faced Ireland as part of the Home Nations Championship.

In 1904, Llwynypia, now seen as a top flight club, found itself a victim of its own success when a number of its players switched to either professional or more 'popular' clubs. Support for the club dwindled and Llwynypia temporarily disbanded in 1905. The club reformed in 1907 but found it hard to gain the support and quality of player it held in the early 1900s. After the First World War, the Rhondda Valleys saw a massive decline in the demand for coal, this created an economic depression which was felt across South Wales. With little disposable income, crowds dwindled, which resulted in many valley clubs facing financial ruin. Llwynypia was one such club and disbanded by the 1930s.

== Notable former players ==
See also Category:Llwynypia RFC players

- (Wales) William Alexander (7 caps)
- (Wales) George Dobson (1 cap)
- (Wales) Tom Dobson (4 caps)
- (Wales) Jack Evans (3 caps)
- (Wales) William Evans (4 caps)
- (Wales) Dick Hellings (9 caps)
- (Wales) Bob Jones (1 cap)
- (Wales) Mark Lewis (1 cap)
- (Wales) Willie Llewellyn (20 caps)

== Bibliography ==
- Griffiths, John (1987). The Phoenix Book of International Rugby Records. London: Phoenix House. ISBN 0-460-07003-7.
- Morgan, Prys (1988). Glamorgan County History, Volume VI, Glamorgan Society 1780 to 1980. Cardiff: University of Wales Press.
- Smith, David; Williams, Gareth (1980). Fields of Praise: The Official History of The Welsh Rugby Union. Cardiff: University of Wales Press. ISBN 0-7083-0766-3.
