= Hopkin Davies =

Wales international rugby union player

- Born: Hopkin Davies

Rugby union career
- Position: Forward
Amateur team(s)
Years	Team	Apps	(Points)
- Swansea RFC
International career
Years	Team	Apps	(Points)
1898–1901	Wales	4	(0)

Hopkin Davies was a Welsh international rugby union forward who played club rugby for Swansea and was capped for the Wales international team on four occasions.

== Rugby career ==
Very little is recorded of Davies' personal life or playing career, though he was recorded as being a Swansea player at the time of his selection for the Welsh national team. Davies was brought into the Welsh squad to play in both the 1898 Home Nations Championship matches against Ireland and England. Wales had just returned from a year out of international rugby due to the Gould Affair and Davies was one of five new caps brought into a vastly changed pack to face Ireland. Davies was one of only two Swansea players in the squad, along with the Wales captain Billy Bancroft, with Cardiff providing almost half the team. The game finished 11–3 to Wales, and Davies was reselected for the last game of the tournament, against England. Wales lost the match 14-7 and the next season saw another major overhaul of the forward positions, with Davies losing his place.

In took another three seasons for Davies to be reselected for Wales again, but in the second Welsh match of the 1901 Championship, he was brought into the pack as a replacement for Pontymister's William Henry Willams. Although the team had won the opening game of the tournament against England, doubts were raised in the press over the cohesion of the Welsh pack, and this proved founded when Wales collapsed towards the end of the match to allow a Scottish victory. Davies played in one more match for Wales, in the final game of the 1901 season, facing Ireland at his club's ground, St. Helen's. Wales won a tight game, but Davies was dropped for the next Championship and did not represent Wales again.

=== International matches played ===
Wales

- England 1898
- Ireland 1898, 1901
- Scotland 1901

== Bibliography ==
- Smith, David; Williams, Gareth (1980). Fields of Praise: The Official History of The Welsh Rugby Union. Cardiff: University of Wales Press. ISBN 0-7083-0766-3.
