= Hugh Poyntz =

English cricketer

Personal information
- Full name: Hugh Stainton Poyntz
- Born: 17 September 1877; Nottingham, England
- Died: 22 June 1955 (aged 77); Harestock, Hampshire, England
- Batting: Right-handed
- Bowling: Right-arm leg-break
- Role: Batsman
- Relatives: Massey Poyntz (brother)

Domestic team information
- Years: Team
- 1904–1921: Somerset
- 1912/13: Orange Free State
- FC debut: 16 May 1904 Somerset v Gloucestershire
- Last FC: 23 May 1921 Somerset v Cambridge University

Career statistics
| Competition | First-class |
|---|---|
| Matches | 40 |
| Runs scored | 1,288 |
| Batting average | 19.22 |
| 100s/50s | 0/3 |
| Top score | 85 |
| Balls bowled | 276 |
| Wickets | 5 |
| Bowling average | 36.40 |
| 5 wickets in innings | 0 |
| 10 wickets in match | 0 |
| Best bowling | 3/37 |
| Catches/stumpings | 27/– |
- Source: CricketArchive, 15 September 2010

Hugh Stainton Poyntz DSO OBE (17 September 1877 – 22 June 1955) was a career soldier who played first-class cricket for Somerset between 1904 and 1921. He also played three matches for Orange Free State in 1912–13. He was born at Nottingham and died at Harestock, Hampshire.

== Family and background ==
Poyntz was the sixth child and second son of a military family. His father was a major in the Royal Marines Light Infantry who later became the Chief Constable of Essex. His younger brother was Massey Poyntz, who captained Somerset at cricket in 1913 and 1914.

== Military career ==
Hugh Poyntz was educated at Eastbourne College and went straight from there into the Army, joining the third battalion of the Sherwood Foresters (the battalion was the former Derbyshire Regiment) in 1896. In 1899 he transferred to the Bedfordshire Regiment, where his elder brother Henry was also an officer. He was to remain as a serving officer for 37 years until his retirement in 1936.

Poyntz saw service in the Boer War and in April 1900 was promoted from second lieutenant to be a full lieutenant. He was further promoted to captain in 1907. By the time of the First World War, Poyntz was already a major and he was promoted to be a temporary lieutenant-colonel in November 1915. This promotion lasted only until January 1916. There were further temporary promotions in 1917 and 1918 until Poyntz became a full lieutenant-colonel at the beginning of 1921. By this time, he had been awarded the Distinguished Service Order and had been mentioned twice in dispatches.

Towards the end of the First World War, Poyntz was appointed to be in charge of an officer cadets' battalion and when the war was over he was appointed to the newly formed Royal Army Educational Corps. He spent the final decade of his military career as the Master of the Duke of York's Royal Military School, a boarding school for the sons and daughters of military families at Dover, with the title of "Commandant".

When he retired from this and from the Army in 1936, he was awarded the OBE.

== Sporting career ==
Poyntz played a few first-class cricket matches for Somerset in each season from 1904 to 1910 as a middle- or lower-order batsman. In his third match in 1904, against Kent at Beckenham, he top-scored in both Somerset innings with 85 in the first and 48 in the second: the 85 would remain his highest first-class score. The following season, 1905, he made an unbeaten 50 in a drawn match against Warwickshire. And, elevated to No 3 in the batting order, he made 80 in a rain-ruined match against Hampshire at Bath. There were no other scores of more than 50 in his other games for Somerset, and he did not appear for the county in the 1911, 1912 or 1913 seasons.

In the South African 1912–13 season, Poyntz played three times for the Orange Free State team, captaining the team in Currie Cup matches. As captain, he put himself on to bowl leg-breaks, and took three for 37 in the first innings he bowled in, and five wickets in the three games: these were his only first-class wickets. He returned to Somerset for two matches in 1914 and a single game in 1921.

Poyntz was also an association football player and was captain of the Army soccer team in 1907.
