= Fred Samuel =

Wales international rugby union & league footballer

Thomas Frederick Samuel
Personal information
- Full name: Thomas Frederick Samuel
- Born: 8 January 1897 Llanelli, Wales
- Died: c. 1941 (aged 43–44)

Playing information

Rugby union
- Position: Fullback
Club
Years	Team	Pld	T	G	FG	P
	New Dock Stars RFC
	Llanelli RFC
≤1922–22	Mountain Ash RFC
	Total	0	0	0	0	0
Representative
Years	Team	Pld	T	G	FG	P
1922	Wales	3	0	2	0	4

Rugby league
- Position: Fullback
Club
Years	Team	Pld	T	G	FG	P
1922–23	Hull FC

Thomas Frederick "Fred" Samuel (8 January 1897 – c. 1941) was a Welsh rugby union, and professional rugby league footballer who played in the 1920s. He played representative level rugby union (RU) for Wales, and at club level for New Dock Stars RFC, Llanelli RFC and Mountain Ash RFC, as a fullback, and club level rugby league (RL) for Hull FC as a fullback.

== Background ==
Fred Samuel born in Llanelli, Wales.

== International honours ==
Fred Samuel won caps for Wales (RU) while at Mountain Ash RFC in 1922 against Scotland, Ireland, and France.
