= Jere Blake =

Wales international rugby union footballer

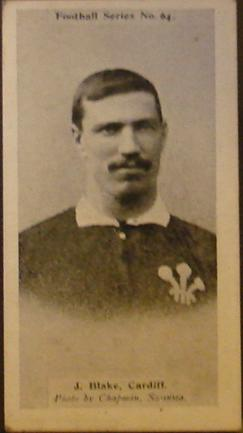
- Blake in Wales jersey
- Born: John Blake; 1875 Cardiff, Wales
- Died: 15 February 1933 (aged 57–58) Cardiff, Wales
- Occupation: Miner

Rugby union career
- Position: Forward
Amateur team(s)
Years	Team	Apps	(Points)
1895-1902	Cardiff RFC		
International career
Years	Team	Apps	(Points)
1899-1901	Wales	9	(0)

John "Jere" Blake (1875 – 15 February 1933) was a Welsh rugby union forward who played club rugby for Cardiff and international rugby for Wales. He was part of the 1900 Wales Triple Crown winning team.

== Rugby career ==
Blake was first capped for Wales during the 1899 Home Nations Championship in the opening game against England. The selectors made multiple changes to the team that finished the previous season, with only six players returning to the squad from that game. Blake was one of five new caps to be brought into the pack, while the Swansea half-back pairing of Evan and David James returned into the team after their reinstatement to the rugby union code. The game was a massive loss for England, with Wales running in six tries, four by Willie Llewellyn. The selectors kept faith with Blake for the rest of the tournament, but Welsh fortunes dropped after the England game, with a loss to Scotland and Ireland.

Blake was back in the Wales team for the entirety of the 1900 Championship under the captaincy of Welsh sporting icon Billy Bancroft. Wales won all three matches and won the Triple Crown for the second time in the country's history. The next season the selectors tried to keep the nucleus of the Championship winning team together and hopes were high that the Welsh team could repeat the last season's feat and retake the Triple Crown. Blake retook his place in the pack, with the forwards being led by Dick Hellings, but they lacked cohesion in the tight and although beating England at the Cardiff Arms Park, looked ragged at times. The next game Scotland took advantage of the weaknesses in the forward positions, with Wales caving in towards the end of the match, with the Scottish winning 18-8. Blake played his final international game when Wales hosted Ireland at St. Helen's for the final game of the tournament. Wales were narrow victors, but the selectors chose a new wave of players at the start of 1902, as they had done in 1899, and Blake lost his place to Will Osborne.

=== International matches played for Wales ===
Wales

- England 1899, 1900, 1901
- Ireland 1899, 1900, 1901
- Scotland 1899, 1900, 1901

== Bibliography ==
- Godwin, Terry (1984). The International Rugby Championship 1883-1983. London: Willows Books. ISBN 0-00-218060-X.
- Griffiths, John (1987). The Phoenix Book of International Rugby Records. London: Phoenix House. ISBN 0-460-07003-7.
- Smith, David; Williams, Gareth (1980). Fields of Praise: The Official History of The Welsh Rugby Union. Cardiff: University of Wales Press. ISBN 0-7083-0766-3.

== Note ==
In 'Gone North - Volume 2', the 'Errata to (Gone North) Volume 1' section states that "Detailed research now indicates that Jere Blake and William Morris appear never to have signed for Salford or any other professional club although they do appear to have trialled for Northern Union clubs".
