= Massey Poyntz =

English amateur cricketer (1883–1934)

Personal information
- Full name: Edward Stephen Massey Poyntz
- Born: 27 October 1883; Chelmsford, Essex, England
- Died: 26 December 1934 (aged 51); Minehead, Somerset, England
- Batting: Right-handed
- Role: Batsman
- Relatives: Hugh Poyntz (brother)

Domestic team information
- Years: Team
- 1905–1919: Somerset
- FC debut: 1 June 1905 Somerset v Gloucestershire
- Last FC: 16 August 1919 Somerset v Hampshire

Career statistics
Competition	First-class
Matches	105
Runs scored	3,127
Batting average	17.08
100s/50s	1/13
Top score	114
Balls bowled	401
Wickets	8
Bowling average	39.62
5 wickets in innings	1
10 wickets in match	0
Best bowling	5/36
Catches/stumpings	96/–
- Source: CricketArchive, 5 November 2012

Edward Stephen Massey Poyntz (27 October 1883 – 26 December 1934) was an English first-class cricketer, who played for Somerset in the early twentieth century. An amateur, Poyntz was an aggressive right-handed batsman. He generally played as part of the middle order, and though his batting was not exceptional, he was highly praised for his fielding ability. He captained Somerset in the two years prior to the First World War.

The youngest son of the Chief Constable of Essex, Poyntz made his county cricket debut in 1905, hitting a half-century to help Somerset win their only match of that season. He achieved his best batting average in that year, while each of the following four were of little note. In 1910 he captained Somerset for the first time, and scored over 300 runs in a season for the second of five occasions. His only attempts at bowling occurred during 1911, when he claimed eight wickets at an average of almost forty. He was named as Somerset's official captain in 1913, and remained in charge for the following season. After serving in the Army during the First World War, Poyntz scored his only century in first-class cricket in a match for the Army against Cambridge University in 1919. He played two further matches for Somerset that year, after which he did not appear in first-class cricket again.

== Early life and career ==
Poyntz was born on 27 October 1883 in Chelmsford, Essex. He was the youngest of seven children born to Major William Henry Poyntz and Henrietta Laycock. His father had achieved the rank of Major in the Royal Marines, and having served as the Chief Constable of Nottingham from 1872 until 1881, held the equivalent position in Essex at the time of his youngest son's birth. Poyntz senior was a cricket enthusiast, and during his time in Nottingham, he ran the police team, and wrote effusively in his reminiscences about watching Nottinghamshire face Yorkshire and Surrey. Educated at Haileybury College, Massey made the school's cricket team in 1901. The family had moved to Gotham House in Tiverton, north Devon, and after leaving school, Poyntz followed his older brother Hugh into the Somerset side.

On his debut for Somerset, Poyntz batted strongly in the lower order to help secure Somerset's only victory of the season. Poyntz's score of 32 in the first innings could not prevent the follow-on, but in the second innings, he hit 60 runs to widen Somerset's lead to almost 150 runs, a total Gloucestershire failed to chase down. His success against Gloucestershire continued in the return fixture later that season, in which he scored 89 of Somerset's total of 169 in the first innings, and 42 runs in the second innings, though their opponents won by an innings after amassing 521 runs in their only innings. In all, Poyntz played five matches in his debut season, totalling 307 runs. His season's batting average of 34.11 was the highest of his career.

In David Foot's history of Somerset cricket, after the 1903 season he wrote that "it's time discreetly to leap over undistinguished seasons." Between 1903 and the cessation of county cricket due to the First World War, Somerset never finished higher than tenth in the County Championship. Poyntz himself struggled for runs between 1906 and 1909: in thirty matches for the county, he failed to score a half-century. Statistically, his worst season came in 1907, when he averaged just 4.66 runs per innings. His most notable incident that season occurred during the match against Middlesex at Lord's. In his own benefit match, Albert Trott claimed two hat-tricks; Poyntz was one of the victims, falling for a second innings duck.

== County captain ==
In 1910, Poyntz captained Somerset for the first time, standing-in during the absence of the regular captain, John Daniell. In that season, he struck his first half-century since 1905, scoring 50 runs in the second innings of a match against Middlesex at Bath. He followed that with another in his next innings, finishing on 52 not out against Lancashire, though Somerset lost both matches by an innings. He finished the 1910 season with 363 runs at an average of 16.50, and appeared in a representative match for the West of England against the East. In their summary of the 1911 season, Wisden Cricketers' Almanack claimed that "the outlook for Somerset is cheerless." The county finished bottom of the championship with only one victory, against Hampshire at Bath. Despite this, Poyntz had one of his most successful seasons: he scored 597 runs at an average of 22.96, and his five half-centuries were the most in any year of his career. He began the season with half-centuries in both innings of a drawn match with Hampshire in Southampton, and two matches later, he bowled for the first time in first-class cricket. Facing Lancashire, Poyntz was called upon as Somerset's ninth bowler in their opponent's second innings: only the captain Daniell and the wicket-keeper, Harry Chidgey, did not bowl. Poyntz bowled eight overs and three balls, and claimed five wickets; his best analysis in first-class cricket. He continued to bowl occasionally for the remainder of the season, but only claimed three further wickets, and finished his career with a bowling average of 39.62. Poyntz was unable to appear as often in 1912; he only played eight times for Somerset, six less than the season before. He scored 253 runs at an average 18.07 that year, and did not pass fifty run in an innings.

Somerset's difficulties were not confined to the pitch. In 1912, the club made a loss of £327, and they could not persuade Daniell to remain at the club rather than travel to India. Initially the county asked Arthur Newton, who was at that time 50 years old, to serve as captain, but after consideration he declined the role, and Poyntz was appointed instead. The team that he inherited remained a poor one: the Wisden summary in 1913 stated that they had, "no temptation to deal at any great length with the doings of Somerset". During a season in which his side had finished bottom of the championship with only two wins, Poyntz scored 363 runs at an average of 15.12, with a single half-century; 50 runs exactly scored against Derbyshire. The club once again recorded a loss during the season, and at the club's annual general meeting, the mood was negative. Despite this, Poyntz was reappointed as captain for 1914 after a proposal made by Bruce Hylton-Stewart and seconded by Newton. Rare optimism was shown by Newton and Poyntz, with the latter claiming that it was due to "a lot of bad luck that they [Somerset] did not finish half way up the table instead of at the bottom."

That optimism was not reflected in Somerset's results the following year. Further financial losses were made, and the county finished second-bottom of the championship. On a personal level, Poyntz scored more runs than in any other season, accruing 642 during his 19 matches at an average of 18.34, and scored three half-centuries. The start of the First World War during the summer of 1914 resulted in the cancellation of some matches, along with a number of players joining the armed forces, disrupting the end of the cricket season. Although Somerset fared poorly under his charge, David Foot claims that Poyntz received "more praise than criticism" for his captaincy.

== Wartime career and later life ==
In September 1914, Poyntz was appointed to the 3rd Battalion, Bedfordshire Regiment. He received promotion to Lieutenant, and then Captain in 1915, before being transferred to the 2nd Battalion in December of that year, serving in the Somme under the command of his brother, Major Hugh Stainton Poyntz. He was shortly thereafter assigned command of "B" Company. He continued to command B Company during the Battle of the Somme. Poyntz commanded the 2nd Battalion for a while in 1917 during his brother's leave, but spent most of the remainder of the war in reserve with the 3rd Battalion. He completed his military service as a Major.

Poyntz only played three further first-class cricket matches after the war. He made his highest total during a match for the Army against Cambridge University, at Fenner's. Batting at number eight, he struck 15 fours and 3 sixes to reach 114 runs in the second innings. The Army lost the match by 10 wickets. Later in the season, he his final appearances for Somerset, playing against Sussex and Hampshire under the captaincy of Daniell, averaging 10.00 from three innings. In all, Poyntz scored 3,127 runs during his first-class career at an average of 17.08. He died on 26 December 1934 in Minehead, Somerset.

== Style and technique ==
Although not highly thought of as a batsman, Poyntz was known for being able to hit the ball hard. A right-handed batsman, he is described as lacking "technique and consistency" by David Foot, but obituaries suggest that his shortage of talent was offset by application of effort. Wisden declared him "an excellent fielder", but Foot is more reserved, describing him as a "passable slip fielder". Sammy Woods was Poyntz's godfather, while Poyntz in turn acted as a godfather to John Daniell's son Nigel. David Foot portrays an element of caricature about Poyntz, describing him as, "a tall man who slammed his hair back with a distinctive parting in the middle." He also related a story from a Somerset teammate in which Poyntz claimed that he could trace him family all the way back to William the Conqueror, and had a massive coat of arms in his Bristol flat.

Sporting positions
Preceded by John Daniell	Somerset County Cricket Captain; 1913–1914	Succeeded by John Daniell
