= Dai Evans =

Wales international rugby union footballer

- Born: David Evans; 1872 Maenclochog, Wales
- Died: 29 January 1912 (aged 39–40) Maenclochog, Wales
- Height: 1.83 m (6 ft 0 in)
- Weight: 89 kg (14 st 0 lb)
- Occupation(s): collier police officer

Rugby union career
- Position: Forward
Amateur team(s)
Years	Team	Apps	(Points)
–	Clydach Vale RFC		
–	Penygraig RFC		
1892-1897	Canton Divisional Police		
–	Barry RFC		
1896-1898	Cardiff RFC		
1897-?	Glamorgan Police RFC		
International career
Years	Team	Apps	(Points)
1896-1898	Wales	4	(0)

David "Dai" Evans (1872 – 29 January 1912) was a Welsh international rugby union forward who played club rugby for Penygraig and international rugby for Wales.

Evans was born in Maenclochog, Pembrokeshire, but came to the Rhondda Valley to find work. A policeman by profession, Evans was one of the first 'Rhondda forwards', an aggressive style of forward player who was expected to play a more physical style game.

== Rugby career ==
Evans first came to note as a rugby player when he was selected to face Scotland as part of the 1896 Home Nations Championship. Originally a collier, Evans became a police officer in 1892 and his size and strength typified the style of forward player the Welsh selectors turned to in the late 19th century. The previous game, the Championship opener against England, saw the first 'Rhondda forward' when Sam Ramsey of Treorchy was selected. Evans played club rugby for neighbouring team Penygraig, and was the first international cap for the club.

Evans was one of five new caps to be brought into the pack for the 1896 game against Scotland, after Wales had suffered a heavy defeat away to England. Wales beat Scotland 6-0, and Evans was reselected to face Ireland for the last game of the tournament. Played at Lansdowne Road, the new Welsh forward play was no match for the Irish kick-and-rush tactics which saw Ireland win 4-8. Despite the defeat, Evans was back for the only match of the 1897 Championship, in a tournament disrupted by Wales leaving the International Rugby Board due to The Gould Affair. The one game Wales played was against England, and Evans played in a pack with Rhondda players Dick Hellings and Jack Rhapps. The game ended with the largest win for Wales over England.

When Wales were accepted back into the International Rugby Board in 1898, Evans found his place in the Welsh team taken by Joseph Booth; but he was reinstated for his last appearance in the final match of the tournament against England. Evans' reintroduction by the selectors was seen by the English press as an attempt to intimidate the England team. Whether this was intentional or not, the result ended in an English victory, and the end of Evans' international career, being replaced by Jere Blake the next season. He died in 1912, at the age of 39 from tuberculosis.

=== International matches played ===
Wales

- England 1897, 1898
- Ireland 1896
- Scotland 1896

== Bibliography ==
- Godwin, Terry (1984). The International Rugby Championship 1883-1983. London: Willows Books. ISBN 0-00-218060-X.
- Griffiths, John (1987). The Phoenix Book of International Rugby Records. London: Phoenix House. ISBN 0-460-07003-7.
- Jenkins, John M.; et al. (1991). Who's Who of Welsh International Rugby Players. Wrexham: Bridge Books. ISBN 1-872424-10-4.
- Parry-Jones, David (1999). Prince Gwyn, Gwyn Nicholls and the First Golden Era of Welsh Rugby. Bridgend: seren. ISBN 1-85411-262-7.
- Smith, David; Williams, Gareth (1980). Fields of Praise: The Official History of The Welsh Rugby Union. Cardiff: University of Wales Press. ISBN 0-7083-0766-3.
- Westcott, Gordon (1992). A Century on the Rugby Beat. The South Wales Police Rugby Football Club.
