= Arthur O'Neill (rugby union) =

England international rugby union player

- Born: 14 April 1878 Teignmouth, Devon, England
- Died: 12 May 1954 (aged 76) Brighton, Sussex, England

Rugby union career
- Position: Forward
International career
Years	Team	Apps	(Points)
1901	England	3	(0)

Arthur O'Neill (14 April 1878 – 12 May 1954) was an English international rugby union player.

Born in Teignmouth, Devon, O'Neill was educated at Newton College, where he learned his rugby.

O'Neill played rugby for St. Bartholomew Hospital RFC and was captain of Devon. He gained his England opportunity in 1901 as a replacement for John Daniell and appeared in all three of their Home Nations fixtures.

== See also ==
- List of England national rugby union players
