= Robert Bradley (rugby union) =

English rugby union player

- Born: 15 March 1873 Crossgate, County Durham, England
- Died: 3 August 1952 (aged 79) Seaton Carew, County Durham, England

Rugby union career
- Position: Forward
International career
Years	Team	Apps	(Points)
1903	England	1	(0)

Robert Bradley (15 March 1873 – 3 August 1952) was an English international rugby union player.

A forward, Bradley played for West Hartlepool and represented his native County Durham from 1899 to 1903.

Bradley's only England cap came in 1903 when he featured in their pack against Wales at Swansea. He is believed to have been the first policeman to play for England and had close to 30 years of police service, which he ended as a sergeant in Darlington, after previously being stationed in the Hartlepool area.

== See also ==
- List of England national rugby union players
