= John Walton (rugby union) =

England international rugby union player

- Full name: Ernest John Walton
- Born: November 1879 York, Yorkshire, England
- Died: 8 April 1947 (aged 67) County Waterford, Ireland
- University: University of Oxford

Rugby union career
- Position: Scrum-half
International career
Years	Team	Apps	(Points)
1901–02	England	4	(0)

Ernest John Walton (November 1879 – 8 April 1947) was an English international rugby union player.

A native of York, Walton played rugby for Yorkshire club Castleford and was also an Oxford blue. He was a half–back and attained four England caps, across their 1901 and 1902 Home Nations campaigns, after which he moved to Burma.

Walton spent an extended period in Siam working for a lumber company, before settling in Ireland.

== See also ==
- List of England national rugby union players
