= Charley Hall (rugby union) =

England international rugby union player

- Full name: Charles John Hall
- Born: 15 July 1874 Gloucester, England
- Died: 14 November 1944 (aged 70) Oxford, England

Rugby union career
- Position: Forward
International career
Years	Team	Apps	(Points)
1901	England	2	(0)

Charles John Hall (15 July 1874 – 14 November 1944) was an English international rugby union player.

Hall was the eldest of seven brothers who played rugby for Gloucester. He was the only one to earn international honours, although his brother Billy gained England caps in rugby league. In 1901, Hall made his two appearances for England, against Ireland at Lansdowne Road and Scotland at Blackheath. He featured 35 times for Gloucestershire and captained the county in their 1901–02 championship final loss to Durham.

A dock worker outside of rugby, Hall later spent three decades as landlord of the Sharpness Hotel, before moving to Sutton Courtenay, Oxfordshire for his final years, managing the Plough Inn.

== See also ==
- List of England national rugby union players
