= Toggie Kendall =

England international rugby union player

- Born: Percy Dale Kendall; 21 August 1878 Prescot, Merseyside, England
- Died: 25 January 1915 (aged 36) Ypres

Rugby union career
- Position: Scrum-half
International career
Years	Team	Apps	(Points)
1901–1903	England	3	(0)

Percy Dale "Toggie" Kendall (21 August 1878 – 25 January 1915) was a rugby union international who represented England from 1901 to 1903. He also captained his country.

== Early life ==
Toggie Kendall was born on 21 August 1878 in Prescot.

== Rugby union career ==
Kendall made his international debut on 9 March 1901 at Rectory Field, Blackheath in the England vs Scotland match. Of the 3 matches he played for his national side he was on the winning side on 0 occasions. He played his final match for England on 21 March 1903 at Athletic Ground, Richmond in the England vs Scotland match. Played most of his career at Birkenhead park Football Club captaining the 1905 Cheshire Lancashire and Cumberland Combined side V New Zealand in 1905

Kendall was killed at Ypres in 1915. He was buried in the Kemmel churchyard next to Fred Turner who captained Scotland in 1914. His grave was prepared by Dr Noel Chavasse VC and Bar, MC, who also died at Ypres in August 1917. The battlefield consumed both graves and Kendal and Turner's remains have never been found.

Sporting positions
Preceded by Bernard Oughtred	English National Rugby Union Captain; Mar 1903	Succeeded by Frank Stout
