= Thomas Collins (soldier) =

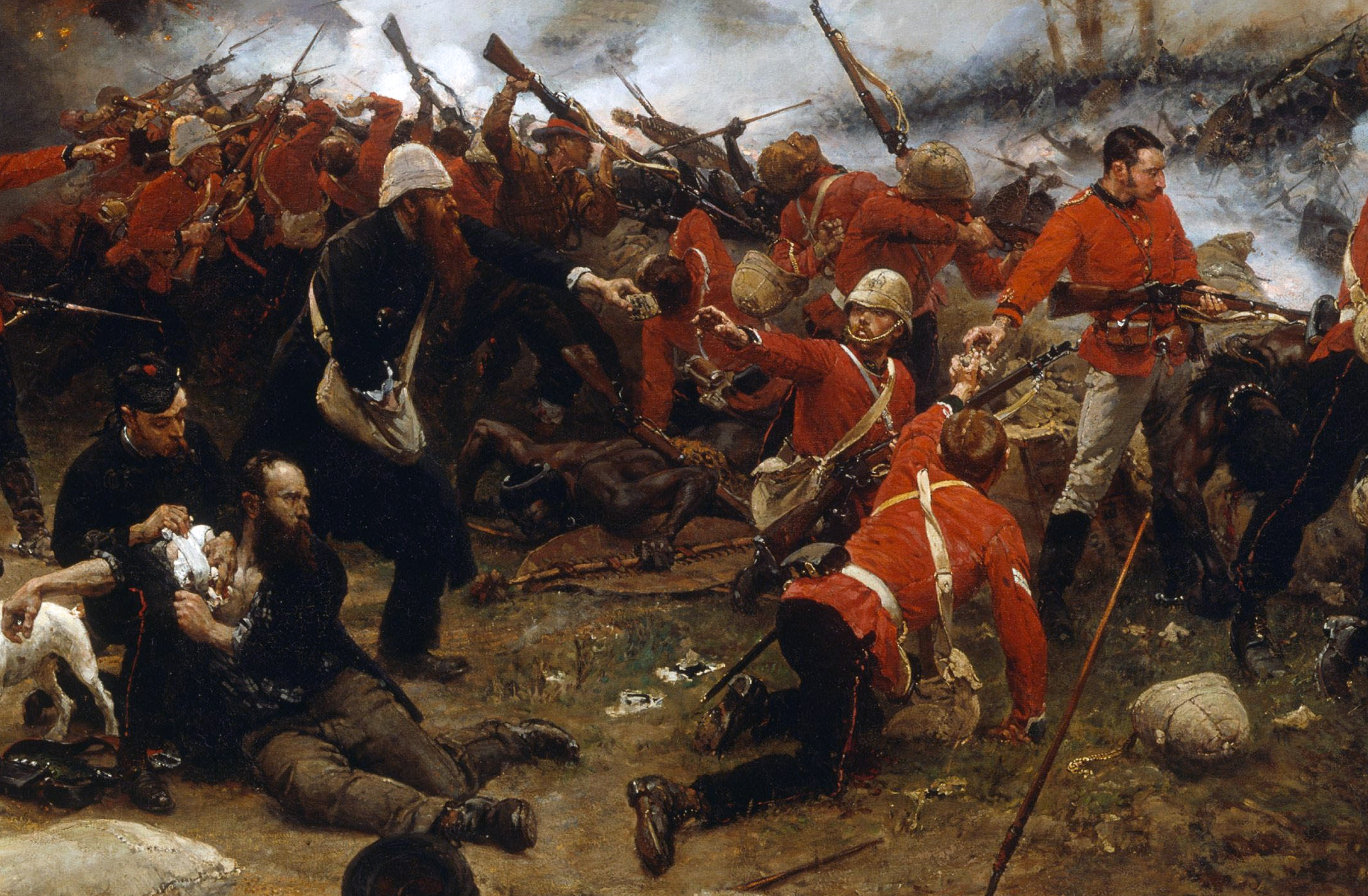
Battle of Rorke's Drift

Private Thomas Collins of Pelcomb, Camrose in the county of Pembrokeshire, Wales was a participant in the battle of Rorke's Drift which took place 22–23 January 1879. During this battle, the 24th regiment of foot fought and resisted a force of at least 4,500 Zulu warriors leaving 17 British dead and 10 wounded, along with 450 dead Zulu warriors.

Private Collins was born 13 February 1861, Pelcomb, Camrose, near the county town of Haverfordwest, son of Thomas Collins of Roch, Pembrokeshire and Dorothy Lewis of Camrose. His great grandparents were William Collins and Martha Smith of Roch, Pembrokeshire.

Private Collins 25B/1396, B Company 2nd battalion is believed to be the youngest soldier to defend the mission station at Rorke's Drift and the only Pembrokeshire representative.

Collins' life was researched by George Harris from Haverfordwest, Pembrokeshire with the help of Andrew Thomas of Thornton, Milford Haven, Pembrokeshire, a relative to Private Thomas Collins, also Kristine Wheatley, a descendant of Caleb Wood, another of the defenders of Rorke's Drift 1879.

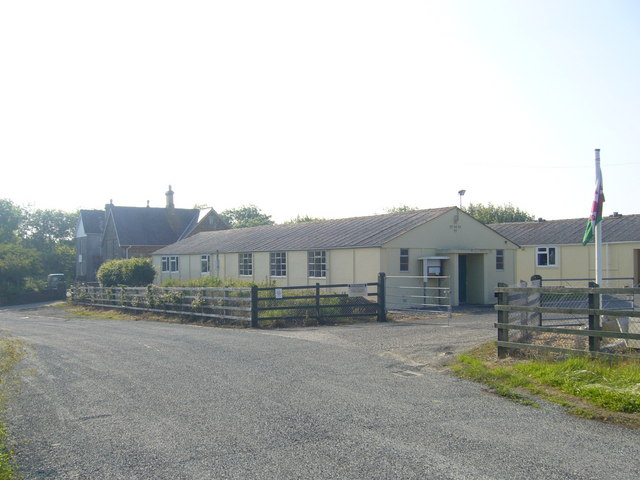
Stone and tablet in memory of Private Thomas Collins at Pelcomb Community Centre, Camrose, Haverfordwest, Pembrokeshire.

A campaign led by George Harris and Pembrokeshire County Council chairman Clive Collins to erect a memorial stone and tablet at Pelcomb succeeded in 2006.
