= Mark Lewis (announcer) =

Former hockey announcer

- Years active: 1981-2016
- Known for: Public address announcer for the Edmonton Oilers (1981–2016)
- Spouse: Anita Lewis

Mark Lewis is the former public address announcer for the Edmonton Oilers.

Lewis' background was in radio and television broadcasting having started his 40 year media career in 1969. Stops in Quebec City, Montreal, Newfoundland and Ontario brought him to BC and eventually Alberta. A career that saw him work as a DJ took a new twist and radio and TV sales became his calling card. Sales began at CBC Television Edmonton and Corus Radio Edmonton. In 1981, Lewis became the PA announcer for the 1981 Canada Cup, held in Edmonton at Northlands Coliseum. Mark became the announcer for the Edmonton Oilers in 1981.

Lewis' pregame routine involved picking up game notes, scouting player line-ups in the Edmonton media lounge, and checking pronunciations of players' names, which presented difficulties given the multi-national nature of the sport and the state of technology at the time. A review of the PA game script was part of the pre game routine. Mark announces the starting lineups, all goals, penalties and other in-arena announcements.

On January 4, 2016, Lewis announced his retirement from announcing after 35 years at the microphone, effective after the 2015-16 NHL season. Upon Lewis' retirement, Scott Bourgeois was named as his replacement. Lewis briefly came out of retirement to call some games of the 2020 Stanley Cup playoffs as Edmonton served as a hub city.
