= Nigel Corbet Fletcher =

England international rugby union player

Nigel Corbet Fletcher CStJ
- Born: 3 August 1877 St Pancras, London, England
- Died: 21 December 1951 (aged 74) Hampstead, London, England

Rugby union career
- Position: Forward
International career
Years	Team	Apps	(Points)
1901–03	England	4	(0)

Nigel Corbet Fletcher (3 August 1877 – 21 December 1951) was an English international rugby union player.

Born in St Pancras, London, Fletcher gained three rugby blues with Cambridge University in the late 1890s and was subsequently capped four times as a forward for England, from 1901 to 1903.

Fletcher, a Hampstead physician, had a long association with St John Ambulance, which he joined as a surgeon in 1916. He was made a Commander of the Order of St John for his service and became their surgeon-in-chief in 1932.

== See also ==
- List of England national rugby union players
