= Arthur O'Neilly =

The Blessed Arthur O'Neilly was born in Ireland in the 13th century. He was ordained a priest in the Trinitarian Order and assigned to care for and try to free Christians who were imprisoned, enslaved and held for ransom by Muslim slave traders around the Mediterranean Sea. The Trinitarian Order was oriented towards this goal, and there are several other members of the order who experienced trial in this line of work, e.g. Saint John of Matha, Saint Felix of Valois, and Saint Raymond Nonnatus.

While contending for the Christian slaves in Egypt, Arthur was captured and was executed by being burned alive on November 1, 1282. Arthur has been beatified by the Roman Catholic Church and so is often known as Blessed Arthur O'Neilly or Blessed Arthur of Egypt. Some refer to him as St. Arthur. His feast day is November 1.
