= Camrose, Pembrokeshire =

Village, parish and community in Pembrokeshire, Wales

Camrose: Welsh: Camros
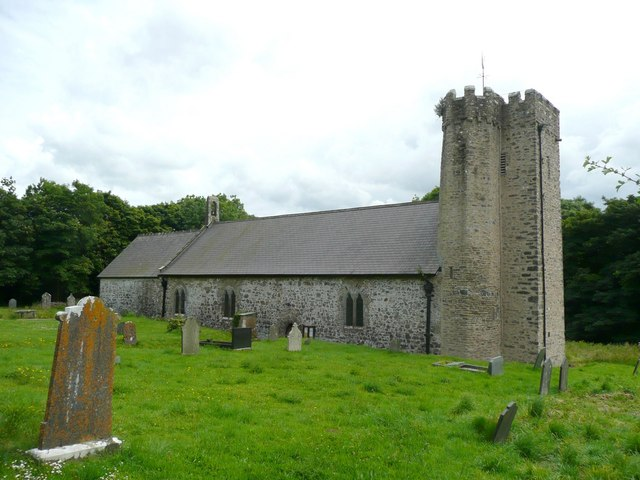
- Parish church of St Ismael

- Location within Pembrokeshire
- Population: 1,740 (2011)
- OS grid reference: SM927201
- Principal area: Pembrokeshire
- Preserved county: Dyfed
- Country: Wales
- Sovereign state: United Kingdom
- Post town: HAVERFORDWEST
- Postcode district: SA62
- Dialling code: 01437
- Police: Dyfed-Powys
- Fire: Mid and West Wales
- Ambulance: Welsh
- UK Parliament: Preseli Pembrokeshire
- List of places UK Wales Pembrokeshire 51.8403°N 5.0083°W Map of the community

Camrose (Welsh: Camros) is a village, parish and community in the historic cantref of Roose (Welsh: Rhos) in Pembrokeshire, Wales. The community includes the villages of Keeston and Wolfsdale. Since 1987 the parish has been expanded to include the whole historic parish of Lambston (including Lambston, Sutton and Portfield Gate) and parts of Haverfordwest St Martins.

Camrose is an anglicization of the Welsh Camros, meaning "crooked" or "broken moor". The village contains a substantial Norman motte, which is often referred to as a "Landsker castle" although it lies far to the south (English) side of that linguistic boundary. A small area, north of Dudwell Mountain, has been Welsh-speaking in modern times but was probably English-speaking before the Enclosures at the end of the 18th century.

The parish church is dedicated to the 6th-century Breton prince and Welsh saint Isfael and is a grade II* listed building. The extent of the civil parish of Camrose is 3,386 hectares.

== Population ==
Camrose is an electoral ward with a population at the 2011 Census of 2,565.

Date	1801	1831	1861	1891	1921	1951	1981
Population	831	1259	1126	833	627	690	1047

The village has its own elected community council and gives its name to an electoral ward of Pembrokeshire County Council. The electoral ward of Camrose covers the communities of Camrose and Nolton and Roch. The seat has been held by an independent member since the reorganisation of 1995. Following the most recent election, it is currently represented by the former leader of Pembrokeshire County Council, Jamie Adams.

== Football Club ==
The village football team, currently in Division 2 of the Pembrokeshire league plays its home matches at Folly Fields at the northern edge of the village, and is managed by Jamie Gilderdale. The second team languish in Division 4 but finished 3rd in division 4 in the 09–10 season and narrowly missed out on promotion. The football team have an official website.

== Notable people ==
- Private Thomas Collins (1861-1879), of Pelcomb, Camrose, died in the battle of Rorke's Drift. A memorial stone and tablet was erected at Pelcomb in 2006.
- Willian Berry, 1st Viscount Camrose, adopted the name of the village when becoming a peer in 1929. His parents had lived in Camrose before moving to Merthyr Tydfil in 1874.
