= Mark Lewis (rugby union) =

Wales international rugby union footballer

- Born: Mark Lewis; March 1889 Pontypridd, Wales
- Died: August 1968 (aged 78–79) Pontypridd, Wales
- Occupation: Collier

Rugby union career
- Position: Wing
Amateur team(s)
Years	Team	Apps	(Points)
–	Treorchy RFC		
–	Llwynypia RFC		
International career
Years	Team	Apps	(Points)
1913	Wales	1	(0)

Mark Lewis (March 1889 – August 1968) was a Welsh international rugby union wing who played club rugby for Treorchy and Llwynypia and international rugby for Wales.

== Rugby history ==
Lewis was born in Pontypridd in 1889, and found work as a coal miner in the Rhondda Valleys and spent his working life at the Archibald Hood's Scotch Mine in Llwynypia. He joined Treorchy RFC, but by 1913 he was playing for Llwynypia. Lewis won just one international cap for Wales, chosen for the 1913 Five Nations Championship after Billy Geen dropped out through injury. Lewis was brought into the Welsh squad to face France, played away at Parc des Princes, in a close game which saw Wales win 11-8.

Lewis was replaced the next match, and never represented Wales again.

=== International matches played ===
Wales

- France 1913

== Bibliography ==
- Godwin, Terry (1984). The International Rugby Championship 1883-1983. Grafton Street, London: Willow Books. ISBN 0-00-218060-X.
- Griffiths, John (1987). The Phoenix Book of International Rugby Records. London: Phoenix House. ISBN 0-460-07003-7.
- Jenkins, John M.; et al. (1991). Who's Who of Welsh International Rugby Players. Wrexham: Bridge Books. ISBN 1-872424-10-4.
- Smith, David; Williams, Gareth (1980). Fields of Praise: The Official History of The Welsh Rugby Union. Cardiff: University of Wales Press. ISBN 0-7083-0766-3.
