= Harry Alexander (rugby union) =

English rugby union footballer

- Born: Harry Alexander; 6 January 1879 Birkenhead, Merseyside, England
- Died: 17 October 1915 (aged 36) Hulluch, France

Rugby union career
- Position: Forward
International career
Years	Team	Apps	(Points)
1900–1902	England	7	(7)
- Military career
- Allegiance: United Kingdom
- Branch: British Army
- Service years: 1915
- Rank: 2/Lt
- Unit: 1 Bn Grenadier Guards
- Conflicts: World War I: Battle of Loos; Battle of the Hohenzollern Redoubt †

Harry Alexander (6 January 1879 – 17 October 1915) was a rugby union international who represented England from 1900 to 1902, and was captain for one match, against Wales.

Alexander was born in Cheshire, and after attending Uppingham School, went to Corpus Christi College, Oxford, where he earned two blues in rugby. While playing for Birkenhead Park after graduating from Oxford, he was selected in 1900 to play for England and earned seven caps over the course of three seasons. In 1902, he authored a book on rugby, How to Play Rugby Football. The Theory and Practice of the Game. Later, he played for Richmond and was captain in his final season, 1905 to 1906.

He was commissioned second lieutenant into the 1st Battalion, the Grenadier Guards in July 1915, and was sent to the Western Front in October, where he participated in the Battle of Loos, and was killed in action, along with some 400 soldiers of his battalion.

== Early life and family ==
Harry Alexander was born on 6 January 1879 in Oxton, Cheshire, the son of a cotton broker. He went to school at Uppingham from 1891 to 1897, then studied at Corpus Christi College, Oxford, from 1897. At Oxford, Alexander read classics, English law, French language and literature, and political theory and institutions, graduating with a Bachelor of Arts degree in 1900. He was secretary of the athletics club in 1899 and captained the cricket XI in 1900, having earned blues in rugby in 1897 and 1898.

On graduating from Oxford, he was appointed assistant master at Stanmore Prep School but then left to become a professional singer.

Alexander had a brother and two sisters. He married Louise Risby in 1913 and together they had a daughter, Jean born in 1914.

== Rugby union career ==
After leaving Oxford, Alexander played for Birkenhead Park. Following the North versus South trials, he made his international debut for England on 3 February 1900 at Athletic Ground, Richmond in the England vs Ireland match. Of the 7 matches he played for his national side he was on the winning side on 2 occasions. He captained England in his penultimate international game, against Wales in 1902, losing by one point. He played his final match for England on 8 February 1902 at Welford Road, Leicester in the England vs Ireland match. In his final year playing for England, Alexander published a work on rugby entitled How to Play Rugby Football. The Theory and Practice of the Game.

Alexander then played for Richmond, and was the team's captain for the 1905–06 season, during which Richmond played the touring Original All Blacks, on 11 November 1905.

=== International appearances ===
Opposition	Score	Result	Date	Venue	Ref(s)
Ireland	15–4	Won	3 Feb 1900	Richmond	
Scotland	0–0	Draw	10 Mar 1900	Inverleith	
Wales	13–0	Lost	15 Jan 1901	Cardiff	
Ireland	10–6	Lost	9 Feb 1901	Lansdowne Road	
Scotland	3–18	Lost	9 Mar 1901	Blackheath	
Wales	8–9	Lost	11 Jan 1902	Blackheath	
Ireland	6–3	Won	8 Feb 1902	Leicester	

== Military service ==
Alexander was commissioned second lieutenant in the 1st Battalion, the Grenadier Guards on 23 July 1915. He was sent to the Western Front in October and was killed after only 13 days of service. His battalion took part in an assault on Hohenzollern Redoubt towards the end of the Battle of Loos, suffering 400 casualties in the span of three hours. Alexander was killed by a shell during this action. He is buried at the Arras Road Cemetery in the Pas de Calais, France.

== See also ==
- List of international rugby union players killed in action during the First World War

Sporting positions
Preceded by William Bunting	English National Rugby Union Captain; Jan 1902	Succeeded by John Daniell
