= Ferndale RFC =

(Wales) Ferndale RFC
- Full name: Ferndale Rugby Football Club
- Nickname: Scarlet Bulldogs
- Founded: 1882 to 1921 (reformed 1989)
- Location: Ferndale, Rhondda Cynon Taff, Wales
- Ground: Greenwood Park
- Coach(es): Marc Whitford, James Read
- Captain: Sam Hodder
- League: WRU Division Three East Central
- 24/25: 2nd
Team kit

Official website
- www.ferndale.rfc.wales

Ferndale RFC are a rugby union club based in the Upper Rhondda Fach, Wales. First formed in 1882, and disbanded in 1921, the club reformed in 1989. They currently play their home games at Greenwood Park, Ferndale (once the site of the Banana Tip) formerly playing their home matches at Blaenllechau Park. Their clubhouse is Ferndale Band club, Lake street, Ferndale.

Ferndale RFC is a member of the Welsh Rugby Union

== History ==
=== Early history ===
Ferndale RFC is believed to have been established during the 1882-83 season, when David Watkins helped to foster the game in the village. It was through his determination that Ferndale RFC became affiliated to the Welsh Football Union in 1891. In 1894 they played in the newly formed Glamorgan league with the Monmouthshire league being formed a year later. It was not until the end of the first decade of the 20th century (1909) that Ferndale began to make its name amongst some of the better known sides in South Wales. Ferndale played host to teams such as Neath, Bath, Llanelli, Pontypridd, Cross Keys, Merthyr, Treorchy and Tredegar on the sloping playing field at the Darran Lake Grounds. It was not unusual for crowds in excess of 3,000 to watch home games and often the half time entertainment was provided by the Ferndale Prize Band, whose home, Ferndale Band and Musical Institute Club, was officially opened in May 1899. It was during this period that Ferndale RFC (the "Scarlet Bulldogs") won two senior cups by beating Cilfynydd at Ynysybwl in 1910 and Treorchy four-nil to win the Glamorgan League Cup in 1912.

By 1921 due to the lack of finances, which had been enhanced by the mining disputes and the dangerous playing surface on the Darran Park, Ferndale RFC folded. It was left to other local teams, such as the Ferndale Bell Boys, the Elmonians and Blaenllechau to keep the rugby alive locally up until 1940, where the Second World War finally put a halt to competitive senior rugby in Wales.

=== Modern game ===
In 1988 a local committee was formed with the intent to reforming Ferndale RFC. After nurturing the plan over six months the club was accepted as a probationary member of the Rhondda & East Glamorgan District Union. It was decided, after permission from the Salisbury Hotel, to use the cellar as a base for the new club's membership.

On September 2, 1989 the first game was played against Fleur De Lys on Ferndale's home ground at Blaenllechau Park, in front of several hundred people. Maerdy Junior RFC, members from Ferndale Male Voice, Cor Meibion Morlais, along with Maerdy Colliery and Tylorstown Silver Band provided pre match entertainment. Jeff Isaac, who not only became the reformed club's first captain, but also scored the first try, which he then converted to draw the first game six-all. The former Salisbury Hotel was purchased as a clubhouse in May 1994.

After progressing through the R.E.G.D. leagues the club was now in a position to push forwards and obtain probationary status from the Welsh Rugby Union. After being vetted by the Welsh Districts and the WRU, the club was finally accepted as a provisional member at the start of the 2001/02 season. This meant that Welsh Rugby Union league games were played at Ferndale for the first time in eighty years and by April 2004, full WRU status was granted.

== The "Sir Stanley Baker Lounge" ==
Ferndale is also the hometown of actor Sir Stanley Baker, and the rugby club honoured him with a tribute in the form of naming the clubhouse lounge the new "Sir Stanley Baker Lounge". Officially opened by his widow, Lady Ellen Baker, on Friday 24 November 2006, the day's events featured a presentation to Sir Stanley's sons and family members. The afternoon also featured a Radio Wales tribute to Sir Stanley, hosted by Owen Money and recorded live in Ferndale RFC itself. The Sir Stanley Baker Lounge features many pictures and memorabilia from his successful career, including wall plaque commemorating the official opening in both English and Welsh.

== Notable former players ==
- (Wales) William Alexander
- (Wales) Dick Thomas
