= William Bunting =

England international rugby union player

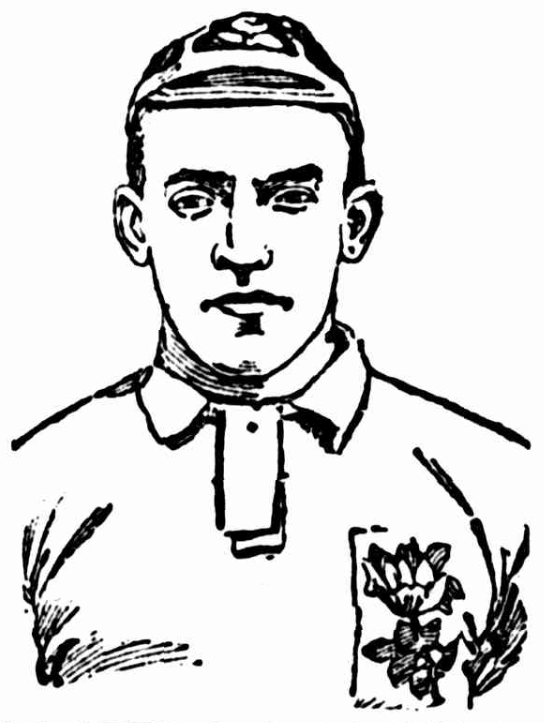
- Born: William Louis Bunting; 9 August 1874 Daventry, Northamptonshire, England
- Died: 15 October 1947 (aged 73) Odiham, Hampshire

Rugby union career
- Position: Centre
International career
Years	Team	Apps	(Points)
1897–1901	England	9	(Pts:0; Tries:0; Conv:0; Pens:0; Drop:0)

William Bunting (1874–1947) was a rugby union international who represented England from 1897 to 1901. He also captained his country.

== Early life ==
William Bunting was born on 9 August 1874 in Daventry.

== Rugby union career ==
Bunting made his international debut on 6 February 1897 at Lansdowne Road in the Ireland vs England match. Of the 9 matches he played for his national side he was on the winning side on 2 occasions. He played his final match for England on 9 March 1901 at Rectory Field, Blackheath in the England vs Scotland match.

Sporting positions
Preceded by Jack Taylor	English National Rugby Union Captain; Feb-Mar 1901	Succeeded by Harry Alexander
