= Leonard Tosswill =

England international rugby union player

Leonard Tosswill OBE
- Full name: Leonard Robert Tosswill
- Born: 12 January 1880 Exeter, Devon, England
- Died: 3 October 1932 (aged 52) Roehampton, Surrey, England

Rugby union career
- Position: Forward
International career
Years	Team	Apps	(Points)
1902	England	3	(0)

Leonard Robert Tosswill (12 January 1880 – 3 October 1932) was an English international rugby union player.

The son of an eye surgeon, Tosswill picked up rugby during his years at Exeter School and later attended Marlborough College, where he was the first XV captain in 1896. He remained active in rugby while studying medicine and competed for St Bartholomew's Hospital, as well as Blackheath. A Devon and Middlesex representative, Tosswill also briefly appeared for England in 1902, gaining three international caps. He retired after obtaining his medical qualifications.

Tosswill served in France with the Royal Army Medical Corps during World War I and was twice mentioned in dispatches. He later became a commissioner in the Ministry of Pensions and was made an Officer of the Order of the British Empire (OBE) in 1919 for his wartime service.

== See also ==
- List of England national rugby union players
