= John Daniell (English sportsman) =

English cricketer & rugby union player

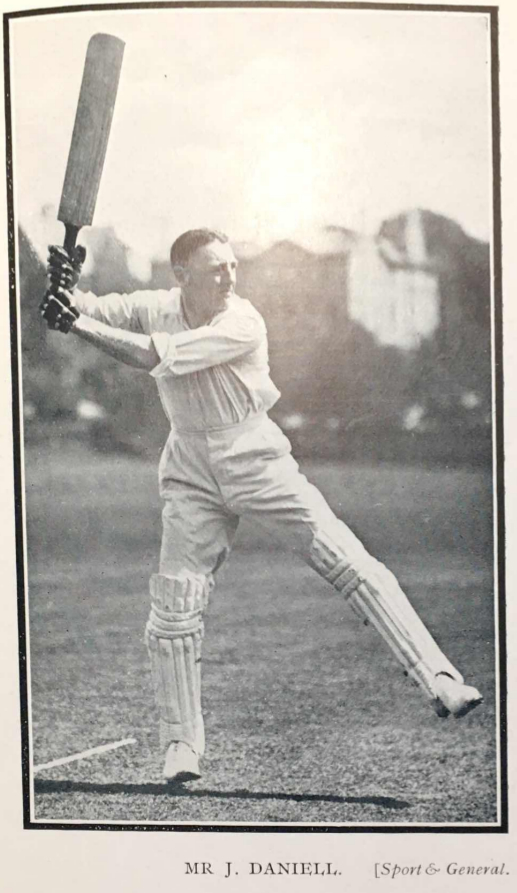

Personal information
- Born: 12 December 1878; Bath, Somerset, England
- Died: 24 January 1963 (aged 84); Holway, Somerset, England
- Batting: Right-handed
- Bowling: Right-arm fast
- Role: Batsman

Domestic team information
- Years: Team
- 1898–1927: Somerset
- FC debut: 20 June 1898 Somerset v Lancashire
- Last FC: 9 July 1927 Somerset v Warwickshire

Career statistics
Competition	First-class
Matches	304
Runs scored	10,468
Batting average	21.94
100s/50s	9/44
Top score	174*
Balls bowled	198
Wickets	7
Bowling average	24.42
5 wickets in innings	0
10 wickets in match	0
Best bowling	1/0
Catches/stumpings	233/–
- Source: Cricinfo, 28 August 2009

John Daniell (12 December 1878 – 24 January 1963) was an international rugby union player for England and a first-class cricketer for Somerset and Cambridge University Cricket Club.

Daniell achieved international success at rugby and was an international selector and a prominent administrator in the game for many years. He was president of the Rugby Football Union for two seasons from 1945 to 1947. His longer playing career was as a cricketer: he was captain of Somerset for 13 of the 15 seasons in which first-class cricket was played between 1908 and 1926, acted as occasional secretary and general organiser for the county over many other years, and was a national selector for the England cricket team.

== Early career ==
Daniell was born in Bath, Somerset. Educated at Clifton College, he went on to Emmanuel College, Cambridge, and was immediately successful as a rugby player, representing the university as hooker in The Varsity Match with Oxford University for three years. His club rugby was for Richmond and he represented England in seven matches between 1899 and 1904.

His cricket career was slower to start. In the summer of 1898, having not played for the university cricket team, he was picked for six Somerset matches by captain Sammy Woods. The following season, he again played for Somerset during the university term, and in late June scored 107, his first century, as Somerset beat Lancashire by 10 wickets. That led to his selection for Cambridge's last match before the Varsity Match and he retained his place in the team to meet Oxford University.

In 1900, he played fairly regularly for Cambridge, made a century in the match against Surrey and again won a cricket Blue, but in 1901, his only appearance for the university team was in the Varsity Match. Up to 1904, he played a few matches each season for Somerset, but he was not notably successful as a cricketer and at the end of 1904 he left England to work in his family's tea estates in India.

== The return ==
Somerset cricket was not very successful in the first decade of the 20th century, and the team was composed of a few professionals of mixed ability, a handful of talented amateurs and a steady procession of mostly ineffectual "country house" cricketers. After Woods retired from the captaincy in 1906, Lionel Palairet, opening batsman and Test player, who had played for Somerset since the county side's elevation to first-class status in 1891, took over for 1907. But at the end of the season, with the county club's finances in disarray and fixtures with several other counties under threat, Palairet told an acrimonious annual meeting of the club that he was not willing to continue. It appeared possible that the county would be wound up, but Daniell, newly returned to England and back as the protégé of Woods, who remained county secretary, agreed to take on the captaincy for 1908.

The professional staff was cut to just three and Daniell embarked on the policy that was to serve Somerset well for many years: recruiting players from far and wide, particularly from the public schools and the English universities, but also from overseas. The policy did not bring the county any great successes, though at times the team could surprise even the best opponents. But Somerset cricket was rarely dull, and the club remained in business.

== Daniell as county cricketer ==
As a player, Daniell was a pugnacious batsman of no exceptional talent, batting mostly in the middle order but occasionally promoting himself to open the innings. In almost 30 years of first-class cricket, he scored only nine centuries, and two of those were in one match in 1925. He never achieved 1,000 runs in a first-class season, and his career average was 21 runs an innings. He was noted as a fearless fielder, usually in positions in front of and close to the wicket. In his early career and at school, he had bowled fast, but in the 20 years from 1908 until he retired in 1927 he bowled only 10 overs in total in first-class cricket: that he took three wickets in them suggests he might have been better than he considered himself.

His main role, though, was as an aggressive captain who used all means at his disposal to make up for the playing deficiencies of the Somerset sides of his time.

== Character and personality ==
There were many stories of John Daniell as cricketer, administrator and martinet. Some of them had a basis in fact.

In The Guardian obituary of Mandy Mitchell-Innes, Somerset and England cricketer of the 1930s and 1940s, the following is told: "His (Mitchell-Innes') favourite memory was of sitting alongside Daniell at Taunton. Suddenly, Frank Lee, the batsman, was hit in the box. 'The box, you say,' thundered Daniell, a former England rugby captain. 'What namby-pamby nonsense is that?' A few minutes later it happened again and Daniell exploded: 'What does he need a so-called box for? In my day, we hit fours with our private parts'."

A less reliable tale, but still apparently in character, was told by the writer Neville Cardus in Playfair Cricket Monthly in 1967.

"In the 1920s, Yorkshire, playing Somersetshire at Bath, were determined, in the last overs of the game, not to win a first innings decision. At this period in cricket’s history, an outright win was worth five points. In drawn games, the side leading on the first innings scored two points. Matches in which no result on the first innings was arrived at had no bearing at all on the Championship. The scoring was reckoned on the percentage of points obtained to points obtainable. Obviously, if rain prevented play at a game’s beginning, limiting the issue to a first innings' decision, percentage could suffer if two points were gained out of a 'possible' five. (The system was unfair because weather frequently did not allow time or scope for the winning of five points.)

"So, at Bath, Yorkshire obstinately declined to score and pass Somersetshire’s first innings' total. The time of the afternoon reached five minutes to six – five minutes before close of play. Emmott Robinson was the obstructive force at one end of the wicket, in his broadest pads. Somersetshire in those days was one of the country’s – nay, the nation’s – great humorous assets. John Daniell was captain, and amongst his co-laughers and practical jokers were Robertson-Glasgow (of everlasting and affectionate memory) and M.D.Lyon. The grim intention of Yorkshire not to score and win on the first innings, this late summer day at Bath, was too much for the comic imagination of Daniell. With only time for the bowling of two overs, he claimed a new ball. Yorkshire would take the lead (first innings) if they scored eight more runs – and lose precious percentage. Daniell gave the new ball to Robertson-Glasgow, perfect instrument in this gorgeous leg-pull of Yorkshire. He at once bowled four byes right down the leg-side, wide of Emmott’s pads, right down to a bank of geraniums in front of the pavilion. Emmott was in high dudgeon, 'Ah’m surprised at you, Dr Glasgow, usin' new ball that way'. And Robertson-Glasgow, who never missed a cue, retorted, 'That comment Emmott, coming from one who knows all, and more than all, of the uses and abuses of new ball manipulation, touches me sorely'. But Daniell, standing at mid-off and wearing an ancient brown 'trilby' hat, cried out, 'Well bowled, Crusoe. Now – four more gerania!’ And again, Robertson-Glasgow sent the new ball fast down the leg-side into the flower-bed – four byes and four more 'Gerania'; and Yorkshire won on the first innings and suffered serious hurt to their Championship percentage and prospects. Here was a classic example of Gamesmanship of wit and picturesque vocabulary – 'Four more Gerania, Crusoe,’ a saying as well worth preserving historically as Nelson’s 'Kiss me, Hardy'.”

The difficulty with the Cardus story is that no Somerset v Yorkshire match of the required period fits the description, though the anecdote appears to fit the characters of the three principal players involved.

Daniell died, aged 84, in Holway, Somerset.

Sporting positions
Preceded by Lionel Palairet; Massey Poyntz	Somerset County Cricket Captain; 1908–1912; 1919–1926	Succeeded by Massey Poyntz; Jack White
Preceded by Richard Cattell; Harry Alexander (rugby footballer); Frank Stout	English National Rugby Union Captain; 1900; Feb–Mar 1902; Feb–Mar 1904	Succeeded by Jack Taylor; Bernard Oughtred; Frank Stout
