= Mountain Ash RFC =

Welsh rugby union club, based in Mountain Ash

(Wales) Mountain Ash RFC
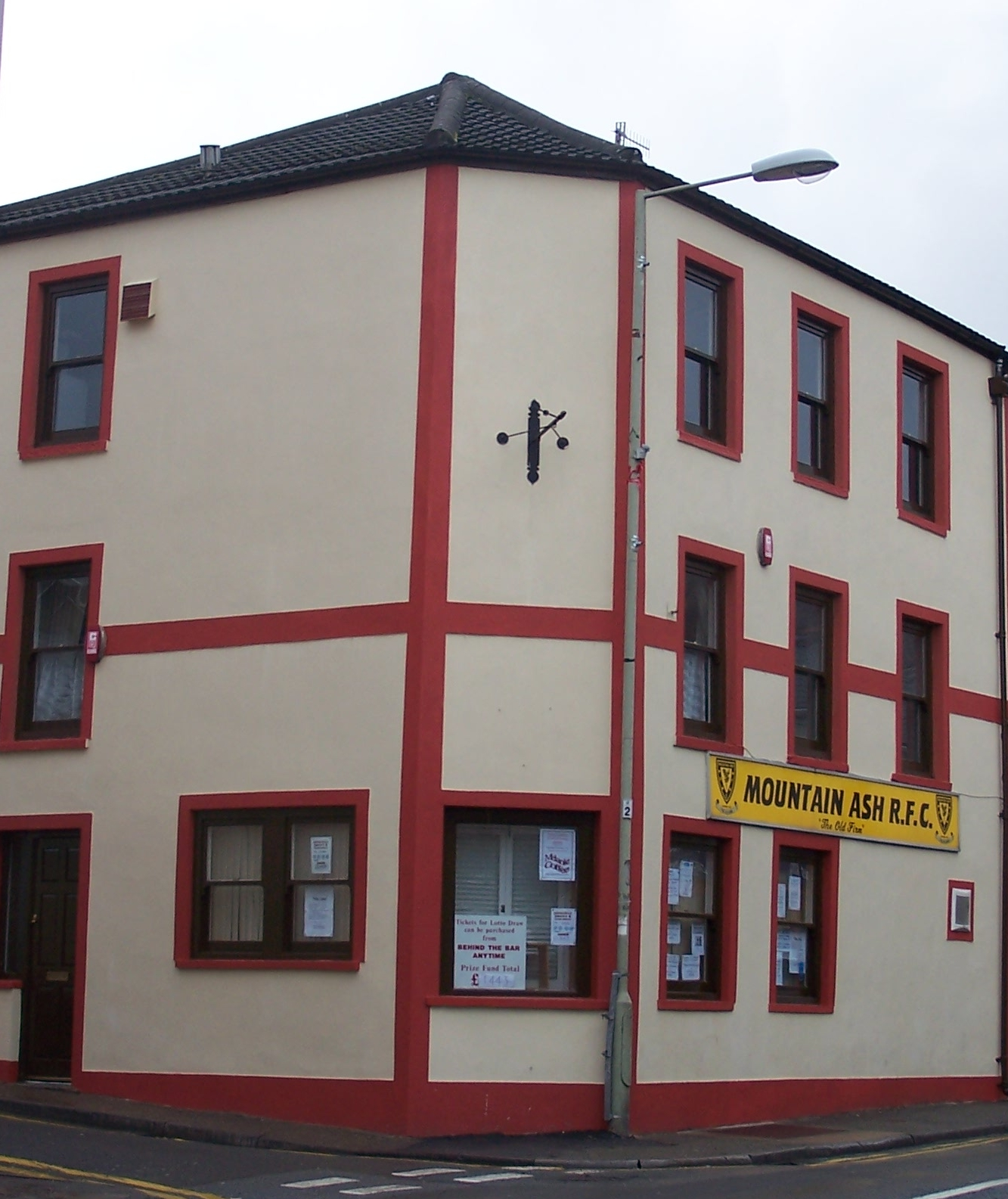
- Full name: Mountain Ash Rugby Football Club
- Nickname: the Old Firm
- Founded: 1875
- Location: Mountain Ash, Wales
- Ground: Parc Duffryn Pennar
- Coach(es): Neil Eynon, Dale Keeping
- League: WRU Championship East
- 2023-2024: 3rd
Team kit

Official website
- www.mountainashrfc.mywru.co.uk

Mountain Ash RFC is a Welsh rugby union club from the town of Mountain Ash, in the Cynon Valley, South Wales. Mountain Ash RFC is a member of the Welsh Rugby Union and is a feeder club for the Cardiff Blues.

== Early history ==
The team was founded in 1875 at a meeting in the Mountain Ash Inn, but their first game in earnest was not until 1891, against Swansea at the Washery Field. Some of their early fixtures were against Llanelli, Cardiff and Newport. Mountain Ash provided their first Wales international in 1892, when Frank Mills was selected for the Home Nations Championship, though at the time he had left Mountain Ash and was then representing Cardiff. It only took another four years for Mountain Ash to claim their first full international to represent Wales while still playing for the club, when Fred Miller was chosen to face Ireland in the 1896 Home Nations Championship. They managed to beat the touring Canadian team in 1904, and in the same year, moved headquarters to the Cresselly Inn. Four years later, they moved to the Recreation Ground, and established their headquarters at the Glancynon Hotel, their current clubhouse.

In 1912, the team toured the south of France, and managed to beat Bayonne RFC and Pau, but the outbreak of the First World War made it difficult for the club to continue. The situation grew even worse during the Second World War, when there were no games played from 1939 to 1946. They survived through this period, however, often maintaining at least one player in the Welsh team. In 1953, the county council removed the grandstand and the perimeter fence from the Recreation Ground, which proved to be devastating for the club, as most first class clubs refused to play there.

During the late 1959/60 season, Mountain Ash had an excellent season losing only four matches under the captaincy of Denis Bryant, who became the club president in the 1970s, and was also instrumental in the creation of the senior second team in the 1960/61 season. In 1963 the first clubhouse was opened by former Welsh international Judge Rowe Harding, which was followed by silverware in the 1964/65 season when they won the Mid District Championship.

In 1994–1995, the club moved to the Parc Duffryn Pennar Ground. In 2000–2001, as part of the club's 125-year celebrations, a game was played against Public School Wanderers.

== At present ==
There are two senior teams, a youth team and a junior section. There is a clubhouse in the town attended by an enthusiastic supporters club and committee. The home ground, Parc Duffryn Pennar has modern facilities, including floodlights and a well maintained playing surface. Many representative games have been played there, including schoolboy internationals. Tours such as one to Canada in 2005 and South Africa in 2007 are regular features.

The first senior team play in the Division One east of the Welsh League. They are coached by Mike Butts and Robert Downes.

== Notable former players ==
See also Category:Mountain Ash RFC players

=== Rugby union internationals ===
- (Wales) Tom Collins (1923)
- (Wales) John Evans (1958)
- (Wales) Anthony Windham Jones (1905)
- (Wales) Leslie Manfield (7 caps) (1939–48)
- (Wales) Jonathan Mason (1988)
- (Wales) Fred Miller (1896-1901)
- (Wales) Frank Mills (1892–96)
- (Wales) Hayden Morris (1951–55)
- (Wales) Will Osborne (1902–03) (6 caps)
- (Wales) Fred Samuel (1922)
- (Wales) Dick Thomas (4 caps) (1906–1909)
- (Wales) George Travers (25 caps) (1903–11)

=== Rugby league internationals ===
- (Wales) T. Emlyn Gwynne
- (Wales) T.B. "Bert" Jenkins
- (Wales) John "Jack" Charles Jenkins
- (Wales) Charles Sage
- (Wales) Richard "Dickie" L. Williams
- (Wales) Brian Juliff

=== Other notable players ===
- George Ewart Evans, Welsh folklorist

== Honours ==
- Glamorgan League Champions 1895–96, 1908–09
- Glamorgan Challenge Cup 1913-14
- Glamorgan Knock Out Cup 1913-14
- Evening Express award of Merit 1920
- Mid-District Champions 1964–65, 1989–90, 2010
- Ivor Williams Cup 1965–66, 1980–81, 1991–92, 1992–93, 1993–94, 2005–06, 2007–08
- Coleman Cup 2004-2005
- W R U National Sevens District C 1968
