= Dicky Goddard =

English dual-code rugby footballer

Personal information
- Full name: Richard Thomas Goddard
- Born: 1879 Gloucester, England
- Died: 1949 (aged 69–70) Gloucester, England

Playing information

Rugby union
Club
Years	Team	Pld	T	G	FG	P
1897–02	Gloucester	110	22	7	1
Representative
Years	Team	Pld	T	G	FG	P
1901–02	Gloucestershire	4

Rugby league
Club
Years	Team	Pld	T	G	FG	P
1902–05	Hull F.C.

Richard Thomas Goddard (1879–1949) was an English rugby union and professional rugby league footballer who played in the 1890s and 1900s. He played representative level rugby union (RU) for Gloucestershire, and at club level for Gloucester, and club level rugby league (RL) for Hull FC.

== Background ==
Dicky Goddard was born in Gloucester, Gloucestershire, England, he later worked as a plumber, and he died aged 69 in Gloucester, Gloucestershire, England.

== Playing career ==
=== County honours ===
Dicky Goddard won caps for Gloucestershire (RU) against Midland Counties, Somerset and Devon during the 1901–02 season, and played in the 3–9 defeat by Durham in the 1902 County Championship Final at Kingsholm Stadium, Gloucester on Saturday 5 April 1902.

== Club career ==
Goddard was initially described by William "Bill" Bailey (known as "W.B.") of the Gloucester Citizen as; "Goddard is looked upon as a promising half-back, but is hardly seasoned enough to take the gruelling that is dealt out in a first-class match", Dicky Goddard played in a trial match for England (RU) in the second match between 'The South', and 'The North' during the 1900–01 season, but he was not selected for England, following Goddard's omission from the England team, William "Bill" Bailey stated; "Had a club pair of half-backs (the Gloucester or Devon Albion couple) been operating behind the English forwards at Cardiff last January, we hardly think Wales would have triumphed by 13 points to nil", during the 1901–02 season, Goddard played in two trial matches for England; for the 'Rest of England' against the English Team, and for the 'London & Varsities' against the 'Rest of the South', but again he was not elected for England, William "Bill" Bailey stated; "Gloucester were, perhaps, never better served at half than by R Goddard and G Hall, and if there is a better couple playing under the Rugby Union, they have not been seen at Kingsholm", Goddard subsequently left rugby union for rugby league, and joined Hull F.C. in 1902, playing alongside former Gloucester players; Jim Cook, George Hall and Jack Lewis.

== Personal life ==
Dicky Goddard was the older brother of John Goddard who played 7 matches at half back for Gloucester, 3 in the 1905–06 season, and 4 in the 1909–10 season.
