= Tom Collins (rugby, born 1895) =

Wales international rugby union & league footballer

Personal information
- Full name: Thomas John Collins
- Born: 14 August 1895 Merthyr Tydfil, Wales
- Died: 8 April 1957 (aged 61) Mountain Ash, Wales

Playing information

Rugby union
- Position: Centre
Club
Years	Team	Pld	T	G	FG	P
≤1923–23	Mountain Ash RFC
Representative
Years	Team	Pld	T	G	FG	P
1923	Wales	1	0	0	0	0

Rugby league
- Position: Centre
Club
Years	Team	Pld	T	G	FG	P
1923–29	Hull FC

Thomas John Collins (14 August 1895 – 8 April 1957) was a Welsh rugby union, and professional rugby league footballer who played in the 1920s. He played representative level rugby union (RU) for Wales, and at club level for Mountain Ash RFC, as a centre, and club level rugby league (RL) for Hull FC, as a centre.

== Background ==
Tom Collins was born in Merthyr Tydfil, and he died aged 61 in Mountain Ash.

== International honours ==
Tom Collins won a cap for Wales (RU) while at Mountain Ash RFC in 1923 against Ireland.
