= Elliott Vivyan =

England international rugby union player

- Full name: Elliott John Vivyan
- Born: 6 January 1879 Devon, England
- Died: 3 December 1935 (aged 56) Bebington, Cheshire, England

Rugby union career
- Position: Three–quarter
International career
Years	Team	Apps	(Points)
1901–04	England	4	(13)

Elliott John Vivyan (6 January 1879 – 3 December 1935) was an English international rugby union player.

Raised in Devonport, Devon, Vivyan was a product of the local YMCA rugby club.

Vivyan was a three–quarter, known for his dash and dummy passes, and had several seasons with Devonport Albion (now Plymouth Albion). One of his club mates was England cap John Matters, with whom he also formed a noted three–quarter partnership in matches for Devon. He was a member of Devon's 1901 County Championship–winning team and gained the first of his four England caps that year when he debuted against Wales at Cardiff. His other three caps came in 1904 and included a two–try performance in a win over Ireland at Blackheath. He was a dockyard worker by profession and later relocated to Birkenhead, where he turned out for the Liverpool and Waterloo clubs.

== See also ==
- List of England national rugby union players
