= Charles Edgar (rugby union) =

England international rugby union player

- Full name: Charles Stuart Edgar
- Born: 1 April 1877 West Derby, England
- Died: 26 May 1949 (aged 72) Chester, England
- Occupation: Ship owner

Rugby union career
- Position: Forward
International career
Years	Team	Apps	(Points)
1901	England	1	(0)

Charles Stuart Edgar (1 April 1877 – 26 May 1949) was an English international rugby union player.

Edgar was born in West Derby and educated at Birkenhead School.

A forward, Edgar played rugby for his local team Birkenhead Park. He served an apprenticeship in their reserves sides until getting regular first team selection in 1899–00, the same season he would make his representative debut for Cheshire. In 1901, Edgar made his only international appearance for England, playing a match against Scotland at Blackheath.

Edgar died in a car accident near Chester in 1949, aged 72.

== See also ==
- List of England national rugby union players
