= Whacker Smith =

England international rugby union player

- Full name: Charles Albert Smith
- Born: 18 July 1878 Westgate, Gloucester, England
- Died: 20 January 1940 (aged 61) Gloucester, England

Rugby union career
- Position: Wing
International career
Years	Team	Apps	(Points)
1901	England	1	(0)

Charles Albert "Whacker" Smith (18 July 1878 – 20 January 1940) was an English international rugby union player.

Smith was the son of a corn porter and hailed from Gloucester.

Known by the nickname "Whacker", Smith was a strongly built, red–haired wing three–quarter. He proved a consistent try scorer for his club Gloucester RFC, crossing over the line 142 times from 270 matches, in a career spanning 1897 to 1908. This included a record eight tries in a match against Clifton in the 1901-02 season.

Smith gained a single England cap, appearing against Wales at Cardiff in 1901.

A labourer by trade, Smith worked for a timber merchants. He died of influenza in 1940, aged 61.

== See also ==
- List of England national rugby union players
