= Ernest Roberts (Royal Navy officer) =

England international rugby union player

Engineer Rear-Admiral Ernest Roberts OBE
- Born: Ernest William Roberts; 14 November 1878; Lowestoft, Suffolk, England
- Died: 19 November 1933 (aged 55); Manchester, England

Rugby union career
- Position: Forward
International career
Years	Team	Apps	(Points)
1901-1907	England	6	(Pts:0; Tries:0; Conv:0; Pens:0; Drop:0)

Engineer Rear-Admiral Ernest William Roberts OBE (1878–1933) was a Royal Navy officer and rugby union international who represented England from 1901 to 1907. He also captained his country. As a rear-admiral in the Royal Navy, he served in Grand Fleet destroyers during World War I. He was appointed an OBE (Military Division) in 1923.

== Biography ==
Ernest Roberts was born on 14 November 1878 in Lowestoft. He died on 19 November 1933 following an adjourned committee meeting to choose teams for an England trial match. Roberts was cremated at Golders Green Crematorium on 22 November 1933. There is a memorial stone in the churchyard of the parish church of St Mary the Virgin at Dedham, Essex commemorating Roberts, his wife and two children.

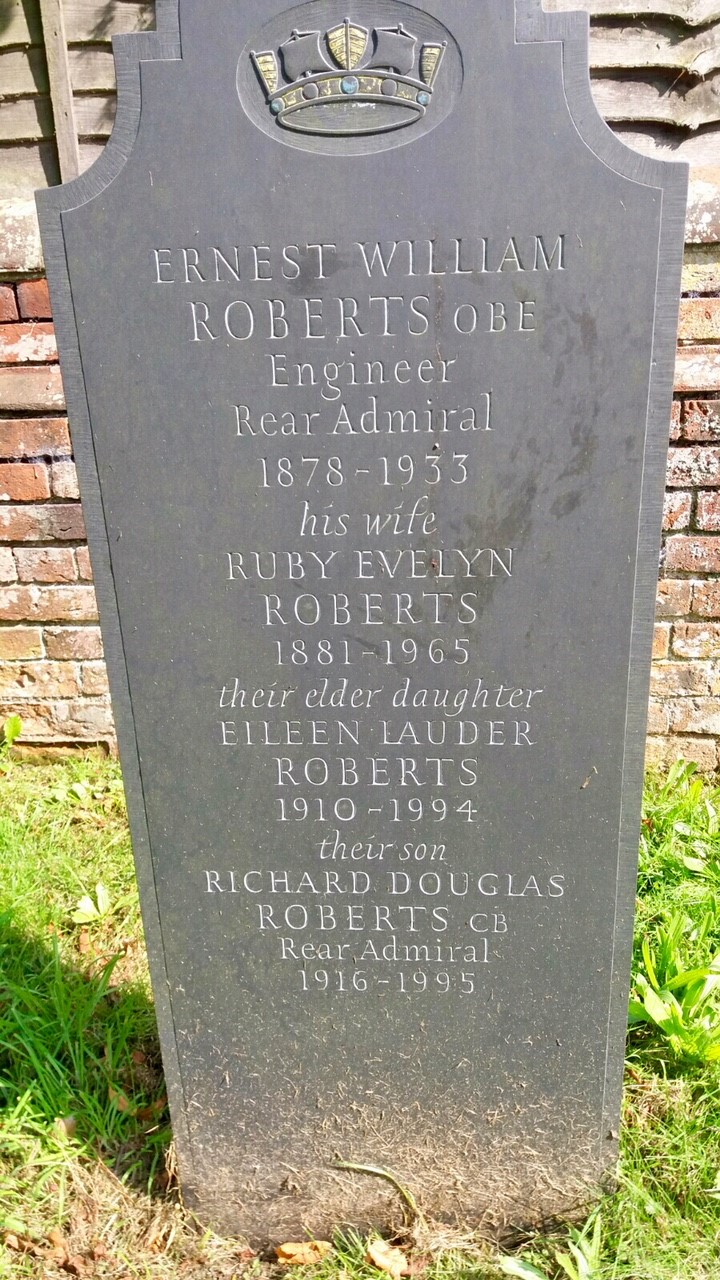
The grave of Ernest Roberts in the churchyard of St Mary the Virgin, Dedham, Essex

== Rugby union career ==
Roberts made his international debut on 5 January 1901 at Cardiff Arms Park in the Wales vs England match. Of the 6 matches he played for his national side he was on the winning side on 0 occasions. He played his final match for England on 16 March 1907 at Rectory Field, Blackheath in the England vs Scotland match.
