= Willie Llewellyn =

British Lions & Wales international rugby union footballer

William 'Willie' Llewellyn
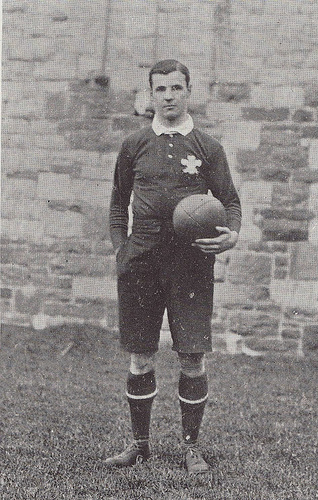
- Llewellyn, taken Jan 1905 while captain against England
- Born: William Morris Llewellyn; 1 January 1878 Tonypandy, Wales
- Died: 12 March 1973 (aged 95) Pontyclun Wales
- Height: 5 ft 7 1/2 in (171 cm)
- Weight: 11 st (154 lb; 70 kg)
- School: Christ College, Brecon
- University: Pharmaceutical College, Bloomsbury
- Notable relative: Tom Williams (uncle)
- Occupation: pharmacist

Rugby union career
- Position: Wing
Amateur team(s)
Years	Team	Apps	(Points)
- Ystrad Rhondda RFC
1895-1900	Llwynypia RFC		
1900–1906	London Welsh RFC		
1902–1905	Newport RFC		
1906–	Penygraig RFC		
–	Cardiff RFC		
–	Glamorgan County RFC		
–	Surrey		
International career
Years	Team	Apps	(Points)
1899–1905	Wales	20	(48)
1904	Great Britain	4	(12)

William Morris Llewellyn (1 January 1878 – 12 March 1973) was a Welsh international rugby union player. He captained Wales in 1905 and London Welsh in 1902. He was a member of the winning Welsh team who beat the 1905 touring All Blacks in the famous Match of the Century. Llewellyn toured with the British Isles to Australasia in 1904 and won three Triple Crown trophies. He played club rugby for many teams, predominantly for Llwynypia and Newport.

== Club career ==
Llewellyn began his club rugby days with Rhondda team Ystrad Rhondda before moving to Llwynypia. Although an unfashionable second tier club, Llwynypia had already provided two Welsh internationals, Dick Hellings and William Alexander, and Llewellyn joined their ranks when he was capped in 1899. In 1900 he moved to London to study at the Pharmaceutical College in Bloomsbury and joined a shabby London Welsh team. Llewellyn's arrival is seen as a turning point for the club; he was immediately made captain and turned the team from a losing side to a force to be reckoned with. On his return to Wales, Llewellyn joined first class club, Newport, who he would stay with through four seasons. On his retirement from international rugby Llewellyn returned to second class club rugby and the Rhondda when he joined Penygraig.

== International career ==
=== Wales ===
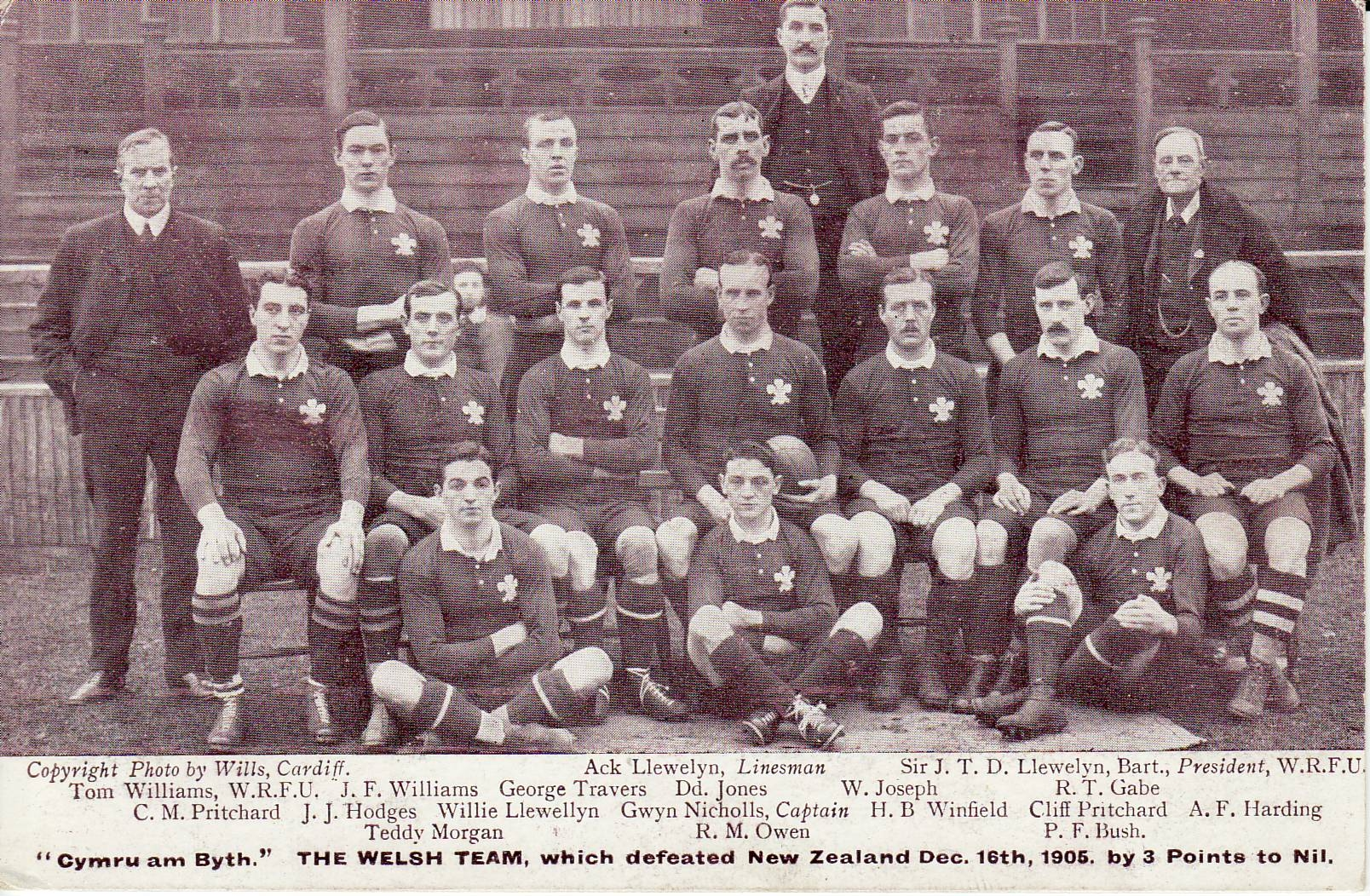
1905 Wales squad, Llewellyn, middle row, third from left

Llewellyn made his debut for Wales against England in 1899, alongside Welsh greats Billy Bancroft and Gwyn Nicholls. It was an impressive display from Llewellyn and the team, with England thoroughly beaten and Llewellyn scoring four tries. Llewellyn scored again on his second game, which was against Scotland, and should have scored on his third match when he faced Ireland but for a poor choice by teammate Reg Skrimshire.

Llewellyn was part of the 1900, 1902 and 1905 Triple Crown winning sides, but his true moment of glory was being part of the great Welsh side of 1905 which beat the Original All Blacks. He was considered a poor choice for the game by many critics as at the time of the game he had switched to Penygraig, a junior club, and he was considered too old for the wing. An uncharacteristic fumble within distance of the try line may have proven his detractors correct, but it did not affect the result and his marking of the All Black Billy Wallace was noted as being ruthlessly impressive.

=== British Lions ===
In 1904 Llewellyn was chosen to tour Australasia alongside fellow Welsh winger Teddy Morgan under the captaincy of Bedell-Sivright. Llewellyn would play in four tests, scoring four tries in the first three tests against Australia.

=== International games played ===
Wales

- England 1899, 1900, 1901, 1902, 1904, 1905
- Ireland 1899, 1900, 1901, 1902, 1903, 1904, 1905
- New Zealand 1905
- Scotland 1899, 1900, 1901, 1902, 1904, 1905

British Isles

- Australia 1904 1st Test, 1904 2nd Test, 1904 3rd Test
- New Zealand 1904

== Later career and death ==
Around 1905 Llewellyn opened a pharmacy in his birth town of Tonypandy. It is reported that during the 1910 Tonypandy Riot the rioters left Llewellyn's pharmacy unscathed due to his sporting celebrity.

When Llewellyn died in 1973 in Pontyclun at the age of 95, he was the last of the 1905 Wales team which beat the Original All Blacks. He is remembered as a modest man who was an excellent captain for club and country and was one of the most devastating wing players in Welsh rugby history.

== Bibliography ==
- Grant, Philip J (2018). Willie Llewelyn, The Road to Victory over the 1905 All Blacks. Ceredigion: Gomer Press. ISBN 978-0-9567271-1-4.
- Parry-Jones, David (1999). Prince Gwyn, Gwyn Nicholls and the First Golden Era of Welsh Rugby. Bridgend: seren. ISBN 1-85411-262-7.
- Thomas, Wayne (1979). A Century of Welsh Rugby Players. Ansells Ltd.
- Smith, David; Williams, Gareth (1980). Fields of Praise: The Official History of The Welsh Rugby Union. Cardiff: University of Wales Press. ISBN 0-7083-0766-3.

Sporting positions
Preceded by J. A. Heywood	London Welsh RFC captain 1900–1903	Succeeded by Arthur Harding
