= Bernard Oughtred =

England international rugby union player

- Born: Bernard Oughtred; 22 August 1880 Hartlepool, County Durham, England
- Died: 12 November 1949 (aged 69) (registered in) Barrow-in-Furness, Cumbria, England

Rugby union career
- Position: Fly-half
International career
Years	Team	Apps	(Points)
1901–1903	England	6	(Pts:0; Tries:0; Conv:0; Pens:0; Drop:0)

Bernard Oughtred (1880–1949) was a rugby union international who represented England from 1901 to 1903. He also captained his country.

== Early life ==
Bernard Oughtred was born on 22 August 1880 in Hartlepool.

== Rugby union career ==
Oughtred made his international debut on 9 March 1901 at Rectory Field, Blackheath in the England vs Scotland match. Of the 6 matches he played for his national side he was on the winning side on 2 occasions. He played his final match for England on 14 February 1903 at Lansdowne Road in the Ireland vs England match.

Sporting positions
Preceded by John Daniell	English National Rugby Union Captain; Jan-Feb 1903	Succeeded by Toggie Kendall
