= William Alexander (rugby union, born 1874) =

Wales international rugby union footballer

- Born: William H. Alexander; 16 July 1874 Glynneath, Neath Port Talbot, Wales
- Died: 1 November 1937 (aged 63) Cadoxton, Wales

Rugby union career
- Position: Prop
Amateur team(s)
Years	Team	Apps	(Points)
- Glynneath RFC
- Ferndale RFC
- Llwynypia RFC
1897-?	Glamorgan Police RFC		
International career
Years	Team	Apps	(Points)
1898-1901	Wales	7	(6)

William Alexander (16 July 1874 – 1 November 1937) was a Welsh international rugby union prop who played club rugby for Llwynypia.

== Club career ==
Alexander began his club rugby days with local rugby team Glynneath, but later moved to Rhondda team Llwynypia. Although an unfashionable second-tier club, Llwynypia provided several international caps around the turn of the century as the 'Rhondda forward' gained acceptability into the Welsh pack. Alexander as a strong prop forward was first selected to represent Wales in the 1898 Home Nations Championship in a game against Ireland, under the captaincy of Billy Bancroft. After a strong Welsh win, Alexander retained his position for the last game of the campaign against England.

Alexander was back for all three matches of the 1899 Championship, which saw Wales demolish England in the opening game at St Helens, but then slip away in the later two encounters against Scotland and Ireland. Alexander missed the 1900 Championship, but played the last two games of the 1901 tournament. These would be his very last internationals, but he finished on a successful note with a clean win against the Irish. Alexander scored his only international points in the Ireland game with two tries. The match is noted as a transition game which saw the end of an older generation, with not only Alexander but also Bancroft playing his last game, and the introduction of future Welsh heroes Rhys Gabe, Dicky Owen and Dick Jones.

=== International games played ===
Wales

- England 1898, 1899
- Ireland 1898, 1899, 1901
- Scotland 1899, 1901

== Bibliography ==
- Parry-Jones, David (1999). Prince Gwyn, Gwyn Nicholls and the First Golden Era of Welsh Rugby. Bridgend: seren. ISBN 1-85411-262-7.
- Smith, David; Williams, Gareth (1980). Fields of Praise: The Official History of The Welsh Rugby Union. Cardiff: University of Wales Press. ISBN 0-7083-0766-3.
