= Norman Cox (rugby union) =

England international rugby union player (1877–1930)

- Full name: Norman Simpson Cox
- Born: 3 September 1877 Sunderland, England
- Died: 29 March 1930 (aged 52) Sunderland, England

Rugby union career
- Position: Centre
International career
Years	Team	Apps	(Points)
1901	England	1	(0)

Norman Simpson Cox (3 September 1877 – 29 March 1930) was an English international rugby union player.

Cox was born in Sunderland. He attended Repton School and Newcastle's Armstrong College.

A three-quarter, Cox played his rugby for hometown club Sunderland and earned regular County Durham representative honours. He gained an England cap in 1901, as a centre against Scotland at Blackheath.

Cox succeeded his father as secretary of Sunderland Gas Company.

== See also ==
- List of England national rugby union players
