= Penygraig RFC =

Welsh rugby union club, based in Penygraig

(Wales) Penygraig RFC
- Full name: Penygraig Rugby Football Club
- Founded: 1877.
- Location: Penygraig, Wales
- Ground: Graig Park
- League: WRU Division Three East Central
- 2017-18: 5th

Official website
- penygraigrfc.co.uk

Penygraig Rugby Football Club is a Welsh rugby union team based in Penygraig, Wales. Penygraig RFC formed in 1877, one of the earlier rugby clubs to emerge, and by the 1890s were a strong voice in the Welsh Rugby Union, one of four clubs from the Rhondda Valley that held WRU representation.

== Early history ==
In the 1887/1888 season, Penygraig played 19 matches, winning 12, drawing 1, and losing 6. Some notable wins was against Bridgend RFC and Penarth RFC. In the 1888/1889 season, Penygraig played 34 matches, winning 21, drawing 5, and losing 8.

The early history of Welsh international rugby saw players selected not so much for form or ability but club connections. Penygraig were one of the first clubs to break this pattern managing to gain international caps for two of their players, Dai Evans in 1896 (4 caps) and Jack Rhapps (1 cap) in 1897. Both men were early exponents of the 'Rhondda forward', heavy labourers chosen for their aggressive style of play. Despite being based in the heart of the industrial South Wales coalfield, Penygraig also supplied one of the most devastating fly-halves of early Welsh rugby when Percy Bush went through the team's ranks before joining Cardiff.

During the turn of the 19th century, Penygraig, like many other successful Welsh clubs, lost several players to the professional Northern Union. Scouts from Northern rugby league teams approached rugby footballers to play in England for a wage. Penygraig lost Rhapps to Salford in 1897 and Frank Shugars to Warrington in 1904.

In 1908 Penygraig were playing to such a high standard that they were chosen as one of the invitational club teams to face the very first touring Australian team. Played at the Athletic Ground in Tonypandy, the Australians won 11-3.

Penygraig's ground hosted the first match of the 1973 Japan rugby union tour of Wales, England and France, when the touring team played an East Glamorgan representative side.

== 2002/03 Silver Ball final ==
Penygraig RFC beat Pontypridd RFC 30-25 in the 2003 Glamorgan County Silver Ball Trophy final; but after the game the entire winning Penygraig XV refused to give a drug sample to UK Sport officials requested by the WRU. The club appealed against the mass suspension the WRU was seeking and it took until January 2004 for a decision to be made. The outcome was the suspension of 19 Penygraig RFC players for 15 months, and the suspension of the club secretary for two years.

== Club honours ==
- 1994-95 Welsh League Division 8B Central - Champions
- 2002-03 WRU Division Three East - Champions
- 2002-03 Glamorgan County Silver Ball Trophy - Winners
- 2016-17 WRU Division Three East central B - Champions

== Games played against international opposition ==
Year	Date	Opponent	Result	Score	Tour
1908	10 October	Australia	Loss	3-11	1908 Australian tour of the British Isles

== Notable players ==
See also Category:Penygraig RFC players

- (Wales) Percy Bush
- (Wales) David "Dai" Maldwyn Davies
- (Wales) Dai Evans
- (Wales) Harry Jones (2 caps)
- (Wales) Willie Llewellyn (20 caps)
- (Wales) Jack Rhapps (1 cap rugby union) (2 caps rugby league)
- (United Kingdom) (Wales) Frank Shugars (8 caps rugby league)
- (Wales) Dick Thomas (4 caps)
- Wales Cameron “super cam” walsh (69 caps)
- Wales Shane “Bobby Joe” Williams (-1 caps)
- Frank Wrentmore, turned to professional rugby league with Mid-Rhondda RLFC and is also notable as being one of the British soldiers involved in the Christmas truce of 1914.
- (Wales) Lee Byrne (41 caps)
