= One More Megabyte =

Studio album by The Toy Dolls
- Released: April 1997
- Recorded: January 1997
- Studios: Fairview Studios, Hull
- Genres: Punk rock; Oi!
- Length: 38:14
- Label: Receiver Records
- Producers: Michael Algar; Keith Nichol

The Toy Dolls chronology
Orcastrated (1995)	One More Megabyte (1997)	On Stage in Stuttgart (1999)

One More Megabyte is the ninth studio album by the English punk rock band Toy Dolls. After the release of Orcastrated (1995), the band's bassist John "K'Cee" Casey left the band and was replaced with Gary "Gary Fun" Dunn. The new line up of the band recorded One More Megabyte at Fairview Studios, Hull, in January 1997, with the band's lead singer and guitarist Michael "Olga" Algar producing the album. The album also contains backing vocals from members of other punk rock bands, including members of the Vibrators, The Lurkers, The Wildhearts, Sugar Snatch, and the Inmates.

The album continues the band's humorous approach to punk rock and Oi! music. A key concept to the album were the increasing popularity of computers, with the album cover, album title and several tracks referring to them. The title track itself refers to a young man obsessed with playing computer games who requires "one more megabyte." Other topics on the album include the quarrels of lovers, the subject of at least four songs, "snotty" Shakespearean actors and "lonely introverts." The album also contains several cover versions, including The Proclaimers' "I'm Gonna Be (500 Miles)". The songs on the album begin and end with brief comedy sketches, or "skits" that relate to the songs, which in the words of one critic "put a wonderful novelty "spin" to the album."

The album was released by Receiver Records in the UK in April 1997. It was also their first domestic release in the United States, where it was released by Rotten Records. The album was a critical success, with Steve Huey of Allmusic saying the album contained "more good-humored, melodic Ramones/Pistols/etc. punk," whilst David Lee Beowülf of Ink 19 saying that he " absolutely, totally [recommends] the Toy Dolls, not just because it’s great punk rock, but because they represent the novelty of punk rock. They have wild choruses, blazing guitar riffs, lightning-fast cover tunes (e.g., “I’m Gonna Be 500 Miles”), and make your heart open up!" The band promoted the album with a year-long world tour entitled the "Mega World Tour 1997".

== Background and recording ==
The Toy Dolls had regularly toured and recorded new albums in the 1990s, including Fat Bob's Feet (1991), Absurd-Ditties (1993) and Orcastrated (1995), each continuing the band's humorous approach to punk rock and Oi! music. After the release of Orcastrated, and a number of successful tours, particularly the tour supporting Absurd-Ditties in 1993, bassist John "K'Cee" Casey became disillusioned with the band and left, and he subsequently moved to Japan where he got married. Gary Fun, former member of Martin Stephenson and the Daintees, joined the band just in time for the recording for the band's next album One More Megabyte. Thus, the band's line up officially consisted of lead singer and guitarist Michael "Olgar" Algar, bassist Gary "Gary Fun" Dunn and drummer Martin "Marty" Yule. Marty, like Gary Fun, had also formerly been a member of Martin Stephenson and the Daintees, and Gary Fun joining the Toy Dolls saw the two members reunited.

The album was recorded in January 1997 at Fairview Studios, Hull. Michael "Olga" Algar himself produced the album, whilst John Spence engineered it. The band were joined by numerous guests from other bands on backing vocals, include Knox from the Vibrators, Tom Spender from The Lurkers and Sugar Snatch, Danny McCormack from The Wildhearts and John "Eddie" Edwards from the Inmates as well as the Vibrations." The liner notes also thank Kevin Beston and Fred Sherrif for backing vocals and Danny "on the piano".

== Music and lyrics ==
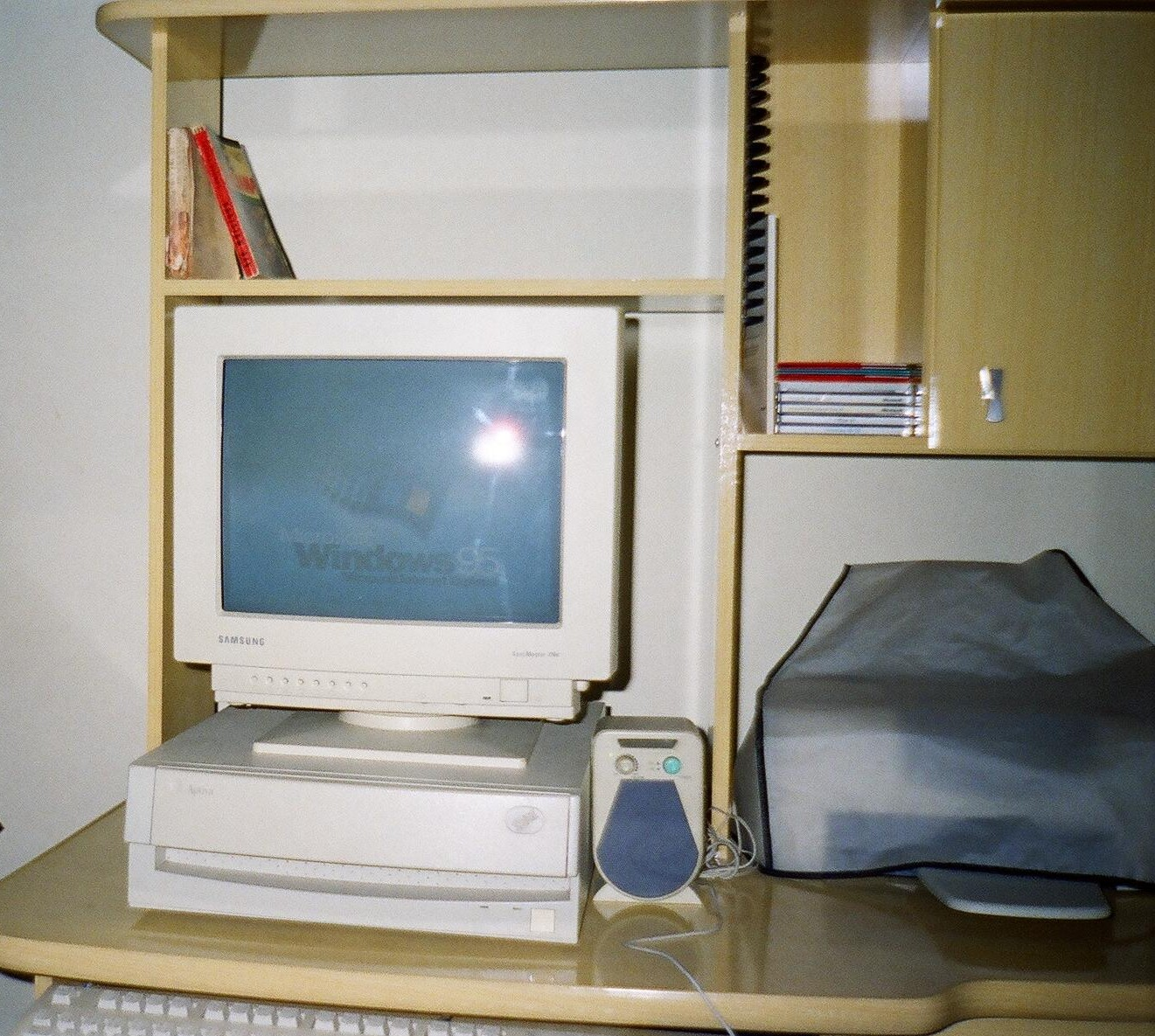
The title track is about a young man's addiction to playing computer games on a Windows 95 computer.

David Lee Beowülf of Ink 19 described the band as "the Monty Python of punk rock, as One More Megabyte is chock full of joke after joke, the objects of which [range variably]." He said that "as an American, listening to One More Megabyte is like reading Viz magazine and smiling smugly to myself because I get the jokes. Then again, what guy out there doesn’t know a woman who’d fit the bill to “She’s a Leech”?" Steve Huey of Allmusic said that the album contained "more good-humored, melodic Ramones/Pistols/etc. punk." "Jimmy" of Captain Oi!, writing for Razorcake, said that the album contains "some of the catchiest hooks they’ve come up with in years." A key concept to the album is the increasing popularity of computers, with the album cover, album title and several tracks referring to them. As such, One More Megabyte was the band's fourth consecutive album based around a specific theme. Flipside commented that the theme "runs through the record" with "hilarious puns and jokes."

The songs on the album were written by Olga. The title track is about a computer game addict who rhetorically asks himself "can I possibly survive without Windows 95?" On the song, Olga is "directly sympathetic" with lyrics such as "Addict with Apple Mac, megabyte maniac", with Joachim Hiller of Ox Fanzine commenting "we go there to hew hereafter on PC / DOS users." The "Mega Outro" also contains references to computers. "Fred Oliver" is about "snotty" Shakespearean actors", whilst "I'm a Lonely Bastard" is about "lonely introverts." "She's a Leech" is about a treacherous partner. Lovers' quarrels are also the subject of at least four songs.

As with the band's previous albums, the album also contains several cover versions, which were described by one critic as being "lightning fast". The most celebrated of the cover versions on the album is "I'm Gonna Be (500 Miles)", originally by The Proclaimers. Guests in the backing chorus include members of the Vibrators, The Lurkers, The Wildhearts, Sugar Snatch, and the Inmates." Another cover version featured is "The Devil Went Down to Scunthorpe", which is listed on the back cover with "Georgia" instead of "Scunthorpe", except scribbled out with "Scunthorpe" written next to it in a felt tip pen. The album also includes a cover of The Shadows' "Bachelor Boy" as part of a composition that also includes the band's own composition "When Gerry Married Melanie". Whilst interviewing Olga, Flipside, commenting on the inclusion of "Bachelor Boy", noted that on "every record there's songs about being a bachelor," with Olga replying that he thinks he does this because "it's subconsciously seeing all these people [former band members] say, "Yeah, I want to be in a band. I'm not going to let girls ruin my life." Then they left and they got married and had children. Then five years later they see me and say, "God I wish I was on tour!" I say, "Well I still am!" I mean I've lost many girlfriends through it. You've got to sacrifice a lot."

Unlike with the band's previous albums, quick, witty sketches feature at the start and end of each song, which, according to Lee Beowülf, "puts a wonderful novelty "spin" to the album." For example, the title song begins with a young man's parents placing a time bomb under his computer in hopes that he will "get off that damn computer!," whilst at the end of the song, a plea for "one more megabyte" — "to stave off the insanity that will come if there’s not enough to run the system" — features as the bomb explodes, with the young man commenting that "Cor! They’re making these computer games more realistic by the minute!"

== Release and promotion ==
One More Megabyte was released on CD in April 1997 in the UK by Receiver Records and Borderline Records, in Germany by Rebel Rec, and on 5 August 1997 in the US by Rotten Records, becoming their first domestic release in the US. Prior to the United States release, Olga had told the Berkeley fanzine My Letter to the World that One More Megabyte is "another album which is going to be almost impossible to get a hold of in America," revealing that the album was not recorded with an American release in mind, but he was later interviewed by American zine Flipside at the time of the American release. When asked by Flipside why it had taken a great deal of time for the band to release another album in the United States, Olga said that "I think [American record labels] just never knew how to market us. Whether to call us punk or what. All the majors have been out to see us play, Geffen and that. But they think, well, we can only sell a few thousand. It's not worth it for them to sell 15-20 thousand, they're not bothered. But if Rotten sells 15-20 thousand, that's really nice. And the fella from Rotten has been coming to see us for the last 15 years." In the UK, the album was also released as an LP, whilst in Spain, it was released as both a CD by Receiver Records and a cassette by Blue Moon Records in conjunction with Receiver Records. Captain Oi! Records re-released the album in the UK on 19 November 2002.

The album cover and title continue the computer themes of the title track and "Mega Outro". The album cover, which features the band contorted against a computer screen from the interior, was the first time the band had been photographed in their album artwork bare-eyed without wearing their iconic square-shaped sunglasses. Although no singles were released from the album in promotion, the band embarked on a world tour after the release of the album, advertised in the liner notes of the album as their "Mega World Tour 1997". The tour marked the first time in eight years that the band had played in the United States. When asked by My Letter to the World why it took the band such a long time for the band to return to the country, Olga replied "Well, I've been saving up the money for eight years, to be able to afford the airflights... and the can and what have you. We haven't got hotels. We just hire like a big bus and we sleep in that." The band were also interviewed with Flipside, Steel Toe Records, and My Letter to the World in promotion of the album. The album was marketed by Trojan Sales Ltd, a British marketing company affiliated with reggae record label Trojan Records.

== Reception ==
Professional ratings
Review scores
Source	Rating
Allmusic	3/5 stars
Ink 19	(favourable)
Ox Fanzine	(5/10)
Razorcake	(favourable)

Critical reception to One More Megabyte was generally favourable, with critics praising the album's spirit, music and lyrics. Steve Huey of Allmusic said that the album contained "more good-humored, melodic Ramones/Pistols/etc. punk from the Toy Dolls, featuring such ditties as "I'm a Lonely Bastard," "The Devil Went Down to Scunthorpe," "She's a Leech,"and a cover of the Proclaimers' "I'm Gonna Be (500 Miles)."" David Lee Beowülf of Ink 19 was very favourable, saying that "A healthy mix of the Young Ones, Rezillos, Iron Maiden, and Queen, the Toy Dolls are the Monty Python of punk rock, as One More Megabyte is chock full of joke after joke," and adding that "I absolutely, totally recommend the Toy Dolls, not just because it’s great punk rock, but because they represent the novelty of punk rock. They have wild choruses, blazing guitar riffs, lightning-fast cover tunes (e.g., “I’m Gonna Be 500 Miles”), and make your heart open up! Guests in the backing chorus include members of the Vibrators, Lurkers, Wildhearts, Sugar Snatch, and the Inmates. Now please send me the last 18 years’ worth of their material!"

Joachim Hiller of the Ox Fanzine rated the album five out of ten and said that despite the computer themed title track, "everything [else is] the same: hysterical fun punk, and yes, the Toy Dolls just always sound like the Toy Dolls sound. And of course there was the obligatory covers, among other things," commenting that the band's cover of "500 Miles (I'm Gonna Be)" "really succeeded." Captain Oi!'s "Jimmy", writing for Razorcake, said that "considering that the Dolls seem to have developed a template for songwriting over the years and have rarely, if ever, strayed from it, the songs contained here are quite exemplary, with some of them containing some of the catchiest hooks they’ve some up with in years. As per usual, a couple of cover songs (“(I'm Gonna Be) 500 Miles,” “The Devil Went Down to Scunthorpe”) are given the Toy Dolls treatment. When you take into account that the most run-of-the-mill Toy Dolls release is miles ahead of some other bands’ best work, the fact that this one is especially good makes it a rare gem, indeed." American punkzine Flipside called the album "great". In his 2004 book Burning Britain: The History of UK Punk 1980–1984, Ian Glasper said that One More Megabyte was "a strong entry into the band's catalogue." He said that the album is "probably best remembered" for "The Devil Went Down to Scunthorpe", which he called "a stunning punked-up re-working."

Unlike some of the band's previous albums, including its direct predecessor Orcastrated, the band were pleased with One More Megabyte, although Olga thought the first half of the album was better than the second half. When asked by Berkley fanzine My Letter to the World about the album in 1997, Olga said "Emm... it's very nice. The first side's better than the second. It's better than the last album. The last album we done was very poor. We've done two really poor albums. One was Bare Faced Cheek, and the last one, Orcastrated were crap." Similarly, when asked about whether he considered Orcastrated was an album he particularly liked in a 1997 interview with Steel Toe Records, Olga said "not really, but our new one, One More Megabyte is really nice." As with the band's other 1990s albums, it did not chart in the UK Albums Chart or on any other national chart, but the supporting world tour was a success. The band followed the release of the album with a live album, On Stage in Stuttgart (1999), before releasing their next studio album, Anniversary Anthems, in 2000. Two songs from One More Megabyte, " She'll Be Back with Keith Someday" and "The Devil Went Down to Scunthorpe", reappeared on the band's best-of compilation We're Mad: The Anthology (2002). In the liner notes of the compilation, music journalist Mark Brennan describes One More Megabyte as an "opus" and noted that "The Devil Went Down to Scunthorpe" was a "classic reworking" which provides further proof of Olga's guitar skills which he noted were praised by Eddie van Halen.

== Track listing ==
All compositions by Michael Algar except where noted

1. "Mega Intro" – 0:56
2. "One More Megabyte" – 2:36
3. "I'm a Lonely Bastard" – 2:33
4. "She's a Leech" – 2:36
5. "Me 'n' John Williams" – 4:12
6. "She'll Be Back with Keith Someday" – 3:03
7. "I'm Gonna Be 500 Miles" (Reid, arr. Algar) – 2:58
8. "Bachelor Boy / When Gary Married Melanie" (Richard, Welch) – 3:39
9. "Fred Oliver" – 2:30
10. "In Tommy's Head" – 2:21
11. "Bored Housewife" – 2:11
12. "The Memory of Nobby" – 3:55
13. "The Devil Went Down to Scunthorpe" (Algar, Crain, Daniels, Edwards) – 3:24
14. "Mega Outro" – 1:20

== Personnel ==
- Michael "Olga" Algar – Vocals, Guitar
- Gary "Gary Fun" Dunn – Bass, Vocals
- Martin "Marty" Yule – Drums, Vocals
