= 41st Tony Awards =

1987 US theatrical awards ceremony

- Date: June 7, 1987
- Location: Mark Hellinger Theatre, New York City, New York
- Hosted by: Angela Lansbury
- Most wins: Les Misérables (8)
- Most nominations: Me and My Girl (13)

Television/radio coverage
- Network: CBS

The 41st Annual Tony Awards was held on June 7, 1987, at the Mark Hellinger Theatre and broadcast by CBS television. Angela Lansbury was the host for the third time (she was also the host in 1968, 1971, 1987, 1988 and 1989). This broadcast was awarded the 1987 Primetime Emmy Award for Outstanding Variety, Music or Comedy Series.

== Eligibility ==
Shows that opened on Broadway during the 1986–1987 season before May 4, 1987 are eligible.

Original plays

- Asinamali!
- Broadway Bound
- Coastal Disturbances
- Cuba & His Teddy Bear
- Death and the King's Horseman
- Fences
- Les Liaisons Dangereuses
- A Month of Sundays
- The Musical Comedy Murders of 1940
- The Nerd
- The Regard of Flight
- Safe Sex
- Sleight of Hand
- Stepping Out
- Sweet Sue
- Wild Honey

Original musicals

- Flamenco Puro
- Honky Tonk Nights
- Into the Light
- Les Misérables
- Me and My Girl
- Oh, Coward!
- Raggedy Ann
- Rags
- Smile
- Stardust
- Starlight Express

Play revivals

- All My Sons
- Arsenic and Old Lace
- As You Like It
- Blithe Spirit
- The Front Page
- The Life and Adventures of Nicholas Nickleby
- Macbeth
- Pygmalion
- Romeo and Juliet
- You Never Can Tell

Musical revivals

- The Mikado

== Ceremony ==
Presenters and performers: Jane Alexander, Bea Arthur, Richard Chamberlain, Glenn Close, Charles "Honi" Coles, Barbara Cook, Hume Cronyn, Bob Fosse, Mark Hamill, Helen Hayes, William Hurt, Bill Irwin, Judy Kuhn, Swoosie Kurtz, Dick Latessa, John Lithgow, Mary Martin, Walter Matthau, Andrea McArdle, Mary Tyler Moore, Bernadette Peters, Lynn Redgrave, Chita Rivera, George Rose, Jessica Tandy, Tommy Tune and Kathleen Turner.

Musicals and plays presented:

- Broadway Bound—scene with Linda Lavin and Jonathan Silverman;
- Coastal Disturbances—scene with Annette Bening and Timothy Daly;
- Fences—scene with James Earl Jones and Courtney B. Vance;
- Les Liaisons Dangereuses—scene with Lindsay Duncan and Alan Rickman;
- Rags – "Rags" – Judy Kuhn and Dick Latessa;
- Les Misérables – "At the End of the Day"/"One Day More" – Company;
- Me and My Girl – "The Lambeth Walk" – Robert Lindsay and Company;
- Starlight Express – "Starlight Express"/"Light at the End of the Tunnel" – Greg Mowry, Steve Fowler and Company;

Special performances and tributes included the song "Bosom Buddies" from Mame, performed by original cast-mates Angela Lansbury and Bea Arthur. There was a special salute to Robert Preston, who died in March 1987. Bernadette Peters sang "Time Heals Everything" from Mack and Mabel, Barbara Cook sang "Till There Was You" from The Music Man, and Mary Martin sang "This House" from I Do! I Do!. Finally, a tribute to George Abbott was introduced by Helen Hayes, with songs from Flora the Red Menace, A Funny Thing Happened on the Way to the Forum, The Boys from Syracuse, Damn Yankees, Where's Charley?, and The Pajama Game.

== Winners and nominees ==
Winners are in bold

Best Play	Best Musical
**Fences – August Wilson**; Broadway Bound – Neil Simon; Coastal Disturbances – Tina Howe; Les Liaisons Dangereuses – Christopher Hampton	**Les Misérables**; Me and My Girl; Rags; Starlight Express
Best Revival	Best Book of a Musical
**All My Sons**; The Front Page; The Life and Adventures of Nicholas Nickleby; Pygmalion	**Alain Boublil and Claude-Michel Schönberg – Les Misérables**; L. Arthur Rose, Douglas Furber, Stephen Fry and Mike Ockrent – Me and My Girl; Joseph Stein – Rags; Howard Ashman – Smile
Best Performance by a Leading Actor in a Play	Best Performance by a Leading Actress in a Play
**James Earl Jones – Fences as Troy Maxson**; Philip Bosco – You Never Can Tell as Waiter; Richard Kiley – All My Sons as Joe Keller; Alan Rickman – Les Liaisons Dangereuses as Le Vicomte de Valmont	**Linda Lavin – Broadway Bound as Kate**; Lindsay Duncan – Les Liaisons Dangereuses as La Marquise de Merteuil; Geraldine Page – Blithe Spirit as Madame Arcati; Amanda Plummer – Pygmalion as Eliza Doolittle
Best Performance by a Leading Actor in a Musical	Best Performance by a Leading Actress in a Musical
**Robert Lindsay – Me and My Girl as Bill Snibson**; Roderick Cook – Oh, Coward! as Performer; Terrence Mann – Les Misérables as Inspector Javert; Colm Wilkinson – Les Misérables as Jean Valjean	**Maryann Plunkett – Me and My Girl as Sally Smith**; Catherine Cox – Oh, Coward! as Performer; Teresa Stratas – Rags as Rebecca Hershkowitz
Best Performance by a Featured Actor in a Play	Best Performance by a Featured Actress in a Play
**John Randolph – Broadway Bound as Ben**; Frankie R. Faison – Fences as Gabriel; Jamey Sheridan – All My Sons as Chris Keller; Courtney B. Vance – Fences as Corey	**Mary Alice – Fences as Rose**; Annette Bening – Coastal Disturbances as Holly Dancer; Phyllis Newman – Broadway Bound as Blanche; Carole Shelley – Stepping Out as Maxine
Best Performance by a Featured Actor in a Musical	Best Performance by a Featured Actress in a Musical
**Michael Maguire – Les Misérables as Enjolras**; George S. Irving – Me and My Girl as Sir John Tremayne; Timothy Jerome – Me and My Girl as Herbert Parchester; Robert Torti – Starlight Express as Greaseball	**Frances Ruffelle – Les Misérables as Éponine**; Jane Connell – Me and My Girl as Maria; Judy Kuhn – Les Misérables as Cosette; Jane Summerhays – Me and My Girl as Lady Jaqueline Carstone
Best Original Score (Music and/or Lyrics) Written for the Theatre	Best Choreography
**Les Misérables – Claude-Michel Schönberg (music) and Herbert Kretzmer and Alain Boublil (lyrics)**; Me and My Girl – Noel Gay (music) and L. Arthur Rose and Douglas Furber (lyrics); Rags – Charles Strouse (music) and Stephen Schwartz (lyrics); Starlight Express – Andrew Lloyd Webber (music) and Richard Stilgoe (lyrics)	**Gillian Gregory – Me and My Girl**; Ron Field – Rags; Brian Macdonald – The Mikado; Arlene Phillips – Starlight Express
Best Direction of a Play	Best Direction of a Musical
**Lloyd Richards – Fences**; Howard Davies – Les Liaisons Dangereuses; Mbongeni Ngema – Asinamali!; Carole Rothman – Coastal Disturbances	**Trevor Nunn and John Caird – Les Misérables**; Brian Macdonald – The Mikado; Trevor Nunn – Starlight Express; Mike Ockrent – Me and My Girl
Best Scenic Design	Best Costume Design
**John Napier – Les Misérables**; Bob Crowley – Les Liaisons Dangereuses; Martin Johns – Me and My Girl; Tony Walton – The Front Page	**John Napier – Starlight Express**; Bob Crowley – Les Liaisons Dangereuses; Ann Curtis – Me and My Girl; Andreane Neofitou – Les Misérables
Best Lighting Design
**David Hersey – Les Misérables**; Martin Aronstein – Wild Honey; David Hersey – Starlight Express; Beverly Emmons and Chris Parry – Les Liaisons Dangereuses

== Special awards ==
- Regional Theatre Award – San Francisco Mime Troupe
- George Abbott, on the occasion of his 100th birthday
- Jackie Mason, for The World According to Me
- Lawrence Langner Award Winner (Lifetime Achievement in Theatre) – Robert Preston (posthumously)

=== Multiple nominations and awards ===
These productions had multiple nominations:

- 13 nominations: Me and My Girl
- 12 nominations: Les Misérables
- 7 nominations: Les Liaisons Dangereuses and Starlight Express
- 6 nominations: Fences
- 5 nominations: Rags
- 4 nominations: Broadway Bound
- 3 nominations: All My Sons and Coastal Disturbances
- 2 nominations: The Front Page, The Mikado, Oh, Coward! and Pygmalion

The following productions received multiple awards.

- 8 wins: Les Misérables
- 4 wins: Fences
- 3 wins: Me and My Girl
- 2 wins: Broadway Bound

== See also ==
- Drama Desk Awards
- 1987 Laurence Olivier Awards – equivalent awards for West End theatre productions
- Obie Award
- New York Drama Critics' Circle
- Theatre World Award
- Lucille Lortel Awards
