= Orcastrated =

Orchastrated

Studio album by Toy Dollz
- Released: February 1995
- Recorded: September 1994
- Studio: Fairview Studios, Hull
- Genre: Punk rock
- Length: 35:23
- Label: Receiver Records
- Producer: Michael Algar

Toy Dollz chronology
Absurd-Ditties (1993)	Orchastrated (1995)	One More Megabyte (1997)

Orcastrated is a studio album by the English Punk rock band Toy Dolls, released in 1995. The band name is rendered as Toy Dollz on this album.

The album features several cover versions of classical music. When fanzine Flipside commented about this in an interview with Michael Algar, Algar said "I really like classical. When I'm at home I never listen to punk music. I mean the Pistols, the Clash and the Damned were all my favorite bands but I like listening to opera and Mozart. To be honest I just want peace and quiet! It's nice to escape from the noise of sound checks, rehersals,(sic) gigs and you appreciate it more when you hear a guitar."

== Track listing ==
All compositions by Michael Algar.

1. Orcastrated 1:15
2. Poltergeist In The Pantry 2:46
3. Please Release Me (Darling I Loathe You) 3:55
4. Taken For A Mug 1:59
5. Any Dream Will Do 2:48
6. Harry's Hands 2:54
7. David's XR2 3:07
8. Pot Luck Percy 2:41
9. Ivy's Lurid Lips 2:15
10. The Psychosurgery 2:53
11. Ron Dixon Dumped D-D 2:34
12. Lazy Sunday Afternoon 2:33
13. Bowling Barmy 2:32
14. Orcastrated 1:11

== Personnel ==
- Michael "Olga" Algar - vocals, guitar
- John "K'Cee" Casey - bass, backing vocals
- Martin "Marty" Yule - drums, backing vocals, lead vocals on "Lazy Sunday Afternoon"

== Reception ==
The band are not a fan of the album. In a 1997 interview with My Letter to the World, Algar said that the band's following album and latest album at the time, One More Megabyte, was "better than the last album." He said that Orcastrated "was very poor" and further commented that "we've done two really poor albums. One was Bare Faced Cheek, and the last one, Oracastrated were crap." The fanzine were a fan of the album, asking Algar "What are you talking about?!", but Algar stated "Bare Faced Cheek and Orcastrated were honestly unbelievebly bad, in my opinion."

Similarly, Nick of Steel Toe Records said it was "one of [his] favorite Toy Dolls albums" in a 1997 interview with Algar, to which Algar made "a puzzled face". When Nick asked him if Orcastrated was "a success in terms of your opinion and fan response?", Algar replied "Not really, but our new one, One More Megabyte is really nice."

Nonetheless, the album was received positively by critics. Writing in 2002 in the American punk rock magazine Razorcake, Jimmy Alvarado wrote that Orcastrated "runs pretty much along the same lines as all the other post-Bare-Faced Cheek releases, meaning the tempos rarely get too frantic, but the songwriting is consistently top-notch. [The] cover of Small Face’s “Lazy Sunday Afternoon” is mighty swell." Ian Glasper also called the album "brilliant" in his 2004 book Burning Britain: The History of UK Punk 1980–1984.
