= Ashbrooke =

Coordinates: 54.895°N 1.388°W

- Location within Tyne and Wear
- OS grid reference: NZ393557
- Metropolitan borough: City of Sunderland
- Metropolitan county: Tyne and Wear
- Region: North East
- Country: England
- Sovereign state: United Kingdom
- Post town: SUNDERLAND
- Postcode district: SR2
- Dialling code: 0191
- Police: Northumbria
- Fire: Tyne and Wear
- Ambulance: North East
- UK Parliament: Sunderland Central

Ashbrooke is a residential area of Sunderland, North East England directly south and south-west of the city centre.

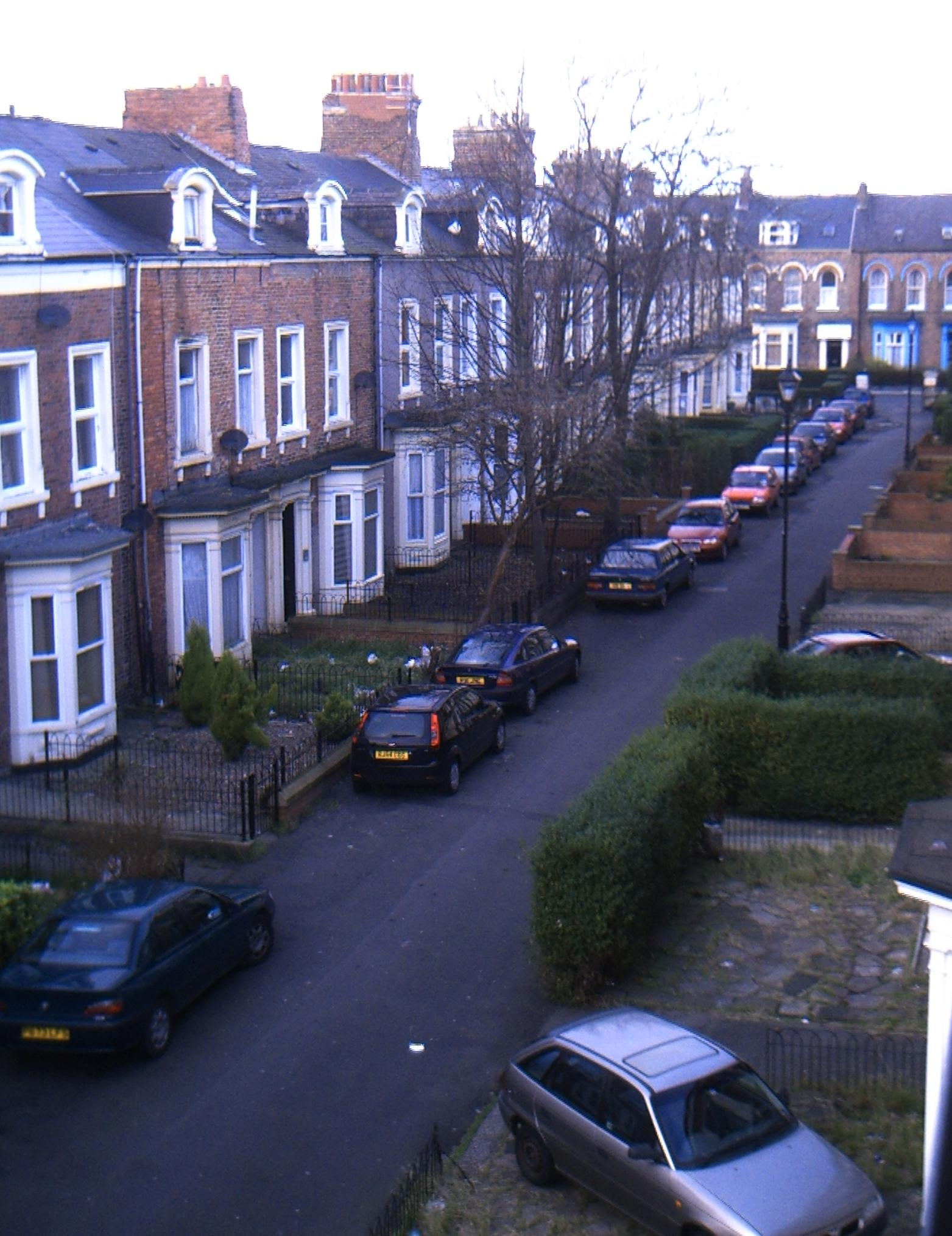
A typical Victorian street in Ashbrooke.

Ashbrooke developed through the Victorian era as Sunderland's first suburb. Originally occupied by large middle-class families, including much of Wearside's Jewish population, a fair number of the larger residences have been reorganised into dwellings of multiple occupancy, home to the local University of Sunderland's students and young professionals.

The large, well-built houses, the wide, tree-lined avenues, and the often colourful street names ('The Esplanade', 'The Oaks', 'The Elms', 'West Lawn', 'Holmlands Park') signify the area's affluence.

The area lies within walking distance of Park Lane and University stations on the Tyne and Wear Metro system.

Local punk band The Toy Dolls wrote a song about Ashbrooke Launderette on their 1987 album Bare Faced Cheek. Various members of the band still either live or work in Ashbrooke.

Ashbrooke is part of St. Michael's ward and is represented by three Conservative councillors; Lyall Reed, Peter Wood and Michael Dixon.

== Sport ==
Ashbrooke Sports Ground, opened on 30 May 1887 for cricket and rugby, is home to many amateur sports associations such as bowls, cricket, tennis, hockey, squash and rugby union. A Tennis tournament before Wimbledon was used as a warm up for players such as Jimmy Connors and Martina Navratilova.

While a minor county, Durham County Cricket Club played games at Ashbrooke, including fixtures against touring international sides. The 1926 Australians attracted a crowd reputed to be over 20,000 for their two-day game in 1926, and the ground also hosted a match between Durham and the West Indians in 1950, notable for Kenneth Trestrail scoring a century in each innings. In 1990, Indian cricketer Sachin Tendulkar made his first appearance in England at Ashbrooke Sports Ground against a League Conference Cricket Conference XI.

Sunderland Rugby Football Club currently play in the Durham/Northumberland Division 2.
