= Richard Armitage (agent) =

British talent agent

- Born: Richard Noel Marshall Armitage; 12 August 1928; Wakefield, West Yorkshire, England
- Died: 17 November 1986 (aged 58); Stebbing, Essex, England
- Occupation: Talent agent
- Father: Noel Gay

Richard Noel Marshall Armitage (12 August 1928 – 17 November 1986) was a talent agent, active in England in the 1950s–1980s.

== Early life ==
Armitage was born on 12 August 1928 in Wakefield, West Riding of Yorkshire. He originally planned to become a barrister and attended Eton College and King's College, Cambridge before leaving to work at the family's cake factory in Pontefract.

== Career ==
Armitage's father was songwriter and music publisher Noel Gay, (born Reginald Moxon Armitage), Armitage joined his father's publishing business, and took charge when he died in 1954. Among his clients were Rowan Atkinson, John Cleese, David Frost and Stephen Fry.

In the late 1950s Richard set up Noel Gay Artists (NGA) in order to ensure a supply of performers for his father's compositions. In the 1960s, NGA's clients included Russ Conway, Peter & Gordon, The Scaffold, Geoff Love, Paul Jones, David Frost, and John Cleese. Producer John Lloyd described him as "the most powerful agent in the country at that time [the late 1970s]".

In the 1970s The King's Singers, The Swingle Singers, Tony Macaulay, Jake Thackray and Claude François were on the company's books. His sons Charles and Alex joined the agency in 1972 and 1976 respectively. Charles had previously worked as a record promotions executive in the United States.

Armitage and his sons were producers for a revival of his father's popular musical, Me and My Girl which debuted in London in February 1985 and for which Stephen Fry (who was also a client of Armitage) wrote 'the Book'. The production went on to win the Olivier Award for Best Music in 1985.

== Personal life and death ==
Armitage married and divorced twice, to Caroline Hay and Gabrielle Lloyd. He had two sons with Hay, Charles and Alex.

Armitage died of a heart attack at his home in Stebbing on November 17, 1986 at the age of 58. After his death, his sons carried on managing the business.
