= Our Last Album? =

Studio album by Toy Dolls
- Released: November 2004
- Recorded: Summer 2004 at Trinity Heights Studio
- Genre: Punk rock, Oi!
- Length: 40:14
- Label: Secret Records
- Producer: Michael Algar

Toy Dolls chronology
Anniversary Anthems (2000)	Our Last Album? (2004)	The Album After the Last One (2012)

Professional ratings
Review scores
Source	Rating
AllMusic	3/5 stars

Our Last Album? is a studio album by the punk band Toy Dolls. It is a loose concept album about the album being their last, until it is explained in "Our Last Outro?" that it isn't.

== Critical reception ==
AllMusic called the album full of "highly melodic, pun-filled nuggets," writing that "it's a bit shocking how vibrant [Toy Dolls] still sound given how predictable the Dolls' methodology has become."

== Track listing ==
1. "Our Last Intro?" – 0:21
2. "The Death of Barry the Roofer with Vertigo" – 2:52
3. "Cheatin' Chick from China" – 2:45
4. "Davey's Days" – 3:33
5. "No One Knew the Real Emu" – 3:10
6. "I Gave My Heart to a Slag Called Sharon from Whitley Bay" – 3:50
7. "Jean's Been" – 2:22
8. "Rita's Innocent" – 3:05
9. "She's So Modern" – 2:54
10. "Chenky Is a Puff" – 2:57
11. "I Caught It from Camilla" – 2:57
12. "Our Last Outro?" – 1:17
13. "The Final Countdown (Europe cover)" – 3:03
14. "Tony Talks Tripe" – 2:16
15. "Yul Brynner Was a Skinhead (New Recording)" – 2:24
16. "Thank You To" – 0:28

== Personnel ==
- Michael "Olga" Algar — Vocals, Guitar
- Tommy Goober — Bass, Vocals
- Dave "The Nut" Nuttall — Drums, Vocals
