= Wakey Wakey =

Studio album by Toy Dolls
- Released: 1989
- Recorded: 1989
- Genre: Punk
- Length: 31:17
- Label: Receiver Records
- Producer: Michael Algar and Keith Nichol

Toy Dolls chronology
Ten Years Of Toys (1989)	Wakey Wakey (1989)	22 Tunes Live From Tokyo (1990)

Professional ratings
Review scores
Source	Rating
AllMusic	3/5 stars

Wakey Wakey is a full-length album by punk band Toy Dolls.

== Track listing ==
All writing by Michael "Olga" Algar, except where noted.

No.	Title	Length
1.	"Introduction"	0:57
2.	"Wakey Wakey Intro"	0:21
3.	"Lester Fiddled The Tax Man"	2:19
4.	"Pot Belly Bill"	3:06
5.	"One Night In Moscow (& We'll Be Russian Home!)"	2:42
6.	"Cloughy Is A Bootboy!"	2:50
7.	"Sabre Dance (traditional)"	2:38
8.	"Daveys Took The Plunge"	3:33
9.	"There's A Trollop Up Elmwood Street"	2:36
10.	"No Particular Place To Go (Chuck Berry)"	2:21
11.	"Poverty Pleadin' Peter"	2:21
12.	"Blaze Of The Borough"	3:10
13.	"Wakey Wakey Outro"	1:54
14.	"Goodnight Irene (traditional)"	0:29

== Personnel ==
- Michael "Olga" Algar – Vocals, Guitar
- John "K'Cee" Casey – Bass, Vocals
- Martin "Marty" Yule – Drums, Vocals
