= Gillian Gregory =

English dancer and choreographer

Gillian Gregory is an English dancer and choreographer for stage and screen. She won the Tony Award for Best Choreography for the Broadway musical Me and My Girl at the 41st Tony Awards. She has worked extensively as a choreographer for film and television. She was the choreographer for the films Mahler (1974), Tommy (1975), Bugsy Malone (1976), Queen Kong (1976), Valentino (1977), Quadrophenia (1979), There Goes the Bride (1980), Reds (1981), Shock Treatment (1981), Pink Floyd – The Wall (1982), Star Wars: Episode VI – Return of the Jedi (1983), Privates on Parade (1983), Top Secret! (1984), and Déjà Vu (1985). She was also the assistant choreographer for The Rocky Horror Picture Show (1975). She has choreographed episodes for television series The Mike Reid Show, The Lively Arts, Wogan, The Innes Book of Records, Thompson, and Campion.

== See also ==
- The Dance Centre
