= Bare Faced Cheek =

Studio album by Toy Dolls
- Released: 12 October 1987
- Recorded: 1987
- Genre: Punk rock
- Length: 32:42
- Label: Neat Records
- Producer: Toy Dolls and Terry Gavaghan

Toy Dolls chronology
| Idle Gossip (1986) | Bare Faced Cheek (1987) | Ten Years Of Toys (1989) |

Professional ratings
Review scores
| Source | Rating |
|---|---|
| Allmusic | 2.5/5 stars |

Bare Faced Cheek is the fourth full-length album by the Punk band Toy Dolls.

Lead singer and guitarist Michael Algar is not a fan of the album, recalling that "we've done a few poor records, but I would have to say that Bare Faced Cheek is the worst; it's awful. The sound was poor; my guitar was broken at the time so I had to use the engineer's guitar with a fuzz box thing... and I hate effects pedals! There is one good track on it though, "Yul Brynner Was a Skinhead"."

== Track listing ==
All songs written by Algar

1. "Bare Faced Cheek" – 0:51
2. "Yul Brynner Was A Skinhead" – 2:54
3. "How Do You Deal With Neal?" – 3:07
4. "Howza Bouta Kiss Babe??!" – 2:50
5. "Fisticuffs In Frederick Street" – 3:19
6. "A. Diamond" – 3:24
7. "Quick To Quit The Quentin" – 2:48
8. "Nowt Can Compare To Sunderland Fine Fare" – 3:03
9. "Neville Is A Nerd" – 2:43
10. "Park Lane Punch Up" – 3:44
11. "The Ashbrooke Launderette... (You'll Stink, Your Clothes'll Shrink, Your Whites'll Be Black As Ink)" – 3:29
12. "Bare Faced Cheek" – 0:30

== Personnel ==
- Michael "Olga" Algar - Vocals, Guitar
- Dean (James) Robson - Bass, Vocals
- Martin "Marty" Yule - Drums, Vocals
