= We Don't Know Where We're Going =

Song
- Published: 1944
- Songwriter(s): Ralph Butler
- Composer(s): Noel Gay

"We Don't Know Where We're Going (Until We're There!)" is a popular song written by British composer Noel Gay and lyricist Ralph Butler, and published in 1944.

It was introduced by Tommy Handley on the BBC radio show ITMA, and became popular among evacuees. The song was later used to great effect during war scenes in the 1975 movie Overlord.
