= Run, Rabbit, Run =

Song written by Noel Gay and Ralph Butler

"Run, Rabbit, Run" is a 1939 song written by Noel Gay and Ralph Butler. The music was by Noel Gay and the song was originally performed by the British singing and comedy double act Flanagan and Allen accompanied by the Harry Bidgood orchestra.

== Background ==
This song was written for Noel Gay's show The Little Dog Laughed, which opened on 11 October 1939, at a time when most of the major London theatres were closed. It was a popular song during World War II, especially after Flanagan and Allen changed the lyrics to poke fun at the Germans (e.g. "Run, Adolf, run, Adolf, run, run, run...").

The lyrics were used as a defiant dig at the allegedly ineffectual Luftwaffe. On 13 November 1939, soon after the outbreak of the Second World War and also soon after the song was premiered, Germany launched its first air raid on Britain, on flying boats that were sheltering in Sullom Voe, Shetland. Two rabbits were supposedly killed by a bomb drop, although it is suggested that they were in fact procured from a butchers' shop and used for publicity purposes.

Walter H. Thompson's TV biography I Was Churchill's Bodyguard rates the song as Winston Churchill's favourite as Prime Minister. Jock Colville, Churchill's private secretary during much of the war, mentions the Prime Minister singing part of the song.

== In popular culture ==
- At the beginning of the 1958 film Dunkirk, the modified Run, Adolf, Run song is performed with a morale boosting cartoon during newsreels played for British troops stationed in France.
- "Run, rabbit, run" is a lyric in the Pink Floyd song "Breathe", possibly reflection of Roger Waters' anti-war sentiments.
- In 1980, sung by Fozzie Bear (Frank Oz) in Season 4, Episode 21 of The Muppet Show, as he attempts to protect a colony of rabbits, which he had accidentally conjured while attempting to perform the pulling a rabbit from a hat magic trick, from a farmer who plans to shoot them. - Original Air Date: Saturday, May 3, 1980
- In a 1992 advert for Weetabix, the song is sung by Elmer Fudd as he chases Bugs Bunny.
- The 2017 horror film Get Out, written and directed by Jordan Peele, uses the original version in the opening scene and once again near the end.
- In the book Miss Peregrine's Home for Peculiar Children, Miss Peregrine and her wards sing along to "Run, Rabbit, Run" while the bomb drops on their home, when the time loop resets.
- "Run, Rabbit, Run" has become a nursery rhyme sung to young British children, often by parents and grandparents who lived through the Second World War.
- In New Zealand the Te Reo Māori version "Oma Rāpeti" is a popular children's song, Anika Moa's version is New Zealand gold certified as at 2022
