= Absurd-Ditties =

Studio album by Toy Dolls
- Released: January 1993
- Recorded: September 1992
- Genre: Punk rock, Oi!
- Length: 36:46
- Label: Receiver Records
- Producer: Michael Algar

Toy Dolls chronology
Fat Bob's Feet (1991)	Absurd-Ditties (1993)	Orcastrated (1995)

Professional ratings
Review scores
Source	Rating
Allmusic	3/5 stars
Robert Gomez	(9/10)

Absurd-Ditties is the seventh full-length album by the punk rock band Toy Dolls, recorded in September 1992 and released in January 1993 by Receiver Records. It is considered by many, including vocalist and guitarist Olga, to be one of the band's best albums. The album title is a play on the word "absurdities", as a description of the album's "absurd ditties".

In 2012, the website of music venue SO36 said that Absurd-Ditties, along with the band's first album Dig That Groove Baby (1983), are "recognized as [two] of the best punk albums of all time." That same year, Olga was asked in an interview with For the Love of Punk "What is the favorite album you’ve done & why?," to which he replied "Absurd Ditties, best songs, best production!" He then was asked "what’s been the most popular Toy Dolls album?," to which he said "Absurd Ditties! and Dig that Groove Baby." He had been previously quoted as saying the album was his personal favourite, commenting "great songs, great production and a great guitar sound." Ian Glasper also called the album "brilliant" in his 2004 book Burning Britain: The History of UK Punk 1980–1984.

== Critical reception ==
Allmusic rated the album three stars out of five.

== Track listing ==
All songs written by Michael "Olga" Algar.

1. "Absurd-Ditties" – 0:44
2. "I'm a Telly Addict" – 2:48
3. ""Terry Talking"" – 2:35
4. "Ernie Had a Hernia" – 3:17
5. "Toccata in Dm" – 2:37
6. "My Wife's a Psycopath!" – 2:52
7. "Sod the Neighbours" – 2:28
8. "Melancholy Margaret" – 2:24
9. "Drooling Banjos" – 3:53
10. "Alecs Gone" – 2:59
11. "When You're Jimmy Savile" – 3:07
12. "Caught up the Reeperbahn!" – 3:19
13. "Dez the Demon Decorator" – 2:57
14. "Absurd-Ditties (End Bit)" – 0:46

== Personnel ==
- Michael "Olga" Algar – Vocals, Guitar
- John "K'Cee" Casey – Bass, Vocals
- Martin "Marty" Yule – Drums, Vocals
