= On Stage in Stuttgart =

Live album by Toy Dolls
- Released: 1999
- Recorded: 1999
- Genres: Punk rock, Oi!
- Length: 72:24
- Label: Receiver Records
- Producer: Bernie Schick

Toy Dolls chronology
One More Megabyte (1997)	On Stage in Stuttgart (1999)	Anniversary Anthems (2000)

Professional ratings
Review scores
Source	Rating
Allmusic	4/5 stars

On Stage in Stuttgart is a live album by the English Punk rock band Toy Dolls, recorded during their two concerts in 1999 in Stuttgart and Frankfurt, Germany.

== Track listing ==
All compositions by Michael Algar except where noted

1. Dig That Groove Theme Tune 2:19
2. The Lambrusco Kid 2:54
3. Idle Gossip 2:12
4. Back In '79 2:48
5. She's A Leech 2:25
6. I've Got Astma 2:22
7. Sabre Dance (Khachaturian) 2:45
8. She'll Be Back With Keith Someday 3:43
9. Fisticuffs In Frederick Street 4:02
10. Bless You My Son 2:00
11. My Girlfriends Dads A Vicar 1:08
12. Yul Brynner Was A Skinhead 2:56
13. Wakey Wakey Theme Tune 0:22
14. Stay Mellow 2:04
15. Eine Kleine Nacht Musik (Mozart) 4:21
16. Fiery Jack 2:42
17. Alecs Gone 3:21
18. I'm Gonna Be 500 Miles 2:45
19. She Goes To Finos 2:57
20. Dig That Groove Baby 4:17
21. Raiders Of The Lost Ark (Williams) 1:07
22. Cloughy Is A Bootboy 2:40
23. Glenda And The Test Tube Baby 4:57
24. Dougy Giro 3:16
25. Nellie The Elephant (Butler, Hart) 6:01

== Personnel ==
- Michael "Olga" Algar - Vocals, Guitar
- Gary "Gary Fun" Dunn - Bass, Vocals
- Martin "Marty" Yule - Drums, Vocals
