= Twenty Two Tunes Live from Tokyo =

Twenty Two Tunes Live From Tokyo

Live album by Toy Dolls
- Released: 1990
- Recorded: 27 December 1989, at Club Quattro, Tokyo, Japan
- Genre: Punk
- Length: 60:35
- Label: Receiver Records

Toy Dolls chronology
Wakey Wakey (1989)	Twenty Two Tunes Live From Tokyo (1990)	Fat Bob's Feet (1991)

Professional ratings
Review scores
Source	Rating
Allmusic	2.5/5 stars

Twenty Two Tunes Live From Tokyo is a live album punk band Toy Dolls recorded during a concert in Tokyo in 1990.

== Track listing ==
All tracks are written by Michael Algar, except where noted

No.	Title	Length
1.	"Wakey Wakey Intro"	1:46
2.	"Dig That Groove Baby"	2:34
3.	"Cloughy Is A Bootboy"	3:09
4.	"Lambrusco Kid"	2:53
5.	"I've Got Asthma"	2:11
6.	"Peter Practice's Practice Place"	3:01
7.	"Deirdre's A Slag"	3:22
8.	"Ashbrooke Launderette"	2:24
9.	"Bless You My Son"	2:24
10.	"My Girlfriends Dad's A Vicar"	2:04
11.	"Spiders In The Dressing Room"	1:18
12.	"Popeye Medley"	2:55
13.	"She Goes To Finos"	3:32
14.	"Fisticuffs In Frederick Street"	2:40
15.	"Harry Cross"	4:06
16.	"Glenda And The Test Tube Baby"	3:51
17.	"Wakey Wakey Outro"	1:53
18.	"When The Saints"	1:37
19.	"Wipe Out" (Connolly, Fuller, Hill, Wilson)	3:05
20.	"Nellie The Elephant"	3:37
21.	"Sabre Dance" (Khachaturian)	2:31
22.	"Blue Suede Shoes" (Perkins)	2:32

== Personnel ==
- Michael "Olga" Algar– vocals, guitar
- John "K'Cee" Casey– bass, vocals
- Martin "Marty" Yule– drums, vocals
