= Taking Steps =

1979 farce by Alan Ayckbourn

- Original language: English
- Written by: Alan Ayckbourn
- Characters: Elizabeth; Roland; Mark; Tristram; Leslie; Kitty
- Subject: Relationships, farce
- Setting: Three floors of an old house

Premiere
- Date: 28 September 1979
- Place: Stephen Joseph Theatre (Westwood site), Scarborough
- Official website

Taking Steps is a 1979 farce by British playwright Alan Ayckbourn. It is set on three floors of an old and reputedly haunted house, with the stage arranged so that the stairs are flat and all three floors are on a single level (hence the play on words in the title).

== Characters ==
There are six characters in the play:

- Elizabeth: Former dancer, retired as a result of her marriage; now in perpetual indecision about whether to leave her husband; her effort to do so sets off much of the action in the play
- Roland: Elizabeth's unappreciative husband; a businessman who is a major presence in the bucket industry; alcoholic
- Mark: Elizabeth's brother, attempting to save his one-sided relationship to Kitty and fulfil his dream of opening a fishing tackle shop
- Kitty: Arm-twisted into engagement with Mark; having left him at the altar once, she has been persuaded to come back to him after her arrest for suspected solicitation; feels trapped into always being part of other people's dreams (including Mark's fishing tackle shop)
- Leslie: Dodgy builder, on the brink financially; desperate to sell the house (currently rented) to Roland
- Tristram: Roland's solicitor; inarticulate and unassertive; unwittingly causes absolute havoc. For Ayckbourn, for all of Tristram's apparent ineffectuality, his is the central role in the play

== Setting ==
The play is set in a dilapidated Victorian three-storey country house, reputedly a former bordello and said to be haunted by a deceased prostitute. According to the set design favoured by the author, all three floors are represented on stage at a single level, with the actors' movements between the floors expressed through mimed movement up and down flat staircases. This means that the downstairs living room, upstairs master bedroom and attic bedroom all occupy the same level, with actors frequently next to each other when their characters are on different floors in the story. (Stage exits lead to other off-stage rooms.) It takes place in London.

Unlike most of Ayckbourn's plays, which are written for the round but are easily adapted for the proscenium, Taking Steps is generally considered to be a play that only works effectively in the round. While the original Stephen Joseph Theatre production was staged this way, the subsequent West End transfer was an end-stage performance, which was considered by Ayckbourn to compromise the effectiveness of the three-floor setting. As a result, the eventual transfer to Broadway in 1991 and the return to London in 2010 both used theatres in the round. (There is also said to have been an end-stage production of Taking Steps that actually did create a three-storey house on stage.)

The play takes place over two acts, both with continuous action. The first act takes place one evening, and the second act takes place the following morning.

== Productions ==
=== Scarborough première ===
Taking Steps was premièred at the Stephen Joseph Theatre (then at its old Westwood site) in Scarborough on 28 September 1979 with the following cast:

- Elizabeth – Alison Skilbeck
- Roland – John Arthur
- Mark – Robin Herford
- Tristram – Robin Bowerman
- Leslie – Jeffrey Robert
- Kitty – Lavinia Bertram

The production team were:

- Director – Alan Ayckbourn
- Music – Paul Todd

=== London première ===
Ayckbourn reportedly had reservations about transferring the production to the West End, due to concerns of overexposure, doubts that a cast with high-profile names would be as effective as the ensemble casts normally used at Scarborough, and partly a feeling that West End audiences were used to his earlier comic plays and not his newer darker plays. However, Ayckbourn's regular producer Michael Codron persuaded him to go ahead with a London production. Following the lack of success of the West End productions of Ten Times Table and Joking Apart, Michael Codron did not allow Ayckbourn to direct Taking Steps, and instead brought in Michael Rudman, then Peter Hall's deputy at the National Theatre. The play opened at the Lyric Theatre on 2 September 1980 with the following cast:

- Elizabeth – Nicola Pagett
- Roland – Dinsdale Landen
- Mark – Paul Chapman
- Tristram – Michael Maloney
- Leslie – Richard Kane
- Kitty – Wendy Murray

Ayckbourn was reportedly very unhappy with the London production, feeling both that the set, end-stage rather than in-the-round, did not work ("it looked a bit like a furniture store"), and that the director, Michael Rudman, had turned an ensemble farce into a star vehicle for Dinsdale Landon as Roland (in the process overshadowing what Ayckbourn viewed as the central role of Tristram). The opening night reception and the reviews were lukewarm. The production nonetheless ran for nine months, from 2 September 1980 to 6 June 1981.

=== New York première ===
The play was eventually premièred on Broadway, over a decade after the UK première, at the Circle in the Square Theatre on 20 February 1991 with the following cast:

- Elizabeth – Jane Summerhays
- Roland – Christopher Benjamin
- Mark – Jonathan Hogan
- Tristram – Spike McClure
- Leslie – Bill Buell
- Kitty – Pippa Pearthree

The director was Alan Strachan. The play ran for two months, from 20 February to 28 April 1991.

=== Other performances ===
Ayckbourn has revived the play himself on two occasions. In 1990, with a relatively short period after the ill-fated London production, it was revived at the Stephen Joseph Theatre with Ayckbourn directing again and Michael Gambon as Roland. It was further revived in 2010 at the Orange Tree Theatre in Richmond, London, just over a year after Ayckbourn stepped down as Artistic Director of the Stephen Joseph Theatre.

Taking Steps has also had numerous performances from other theatre companies. It has also enjoyed success abroad; it was reported by The Stage that, with 462 performances, it was the most performed play in Germany in 1982.
