= Horsey Horsey =

1937 popular song

Horsey, Horsey is a comedy song written in 1937 by Paddy Roberts, Elton Box, Desmond Cox and Ralph Butler, which was made popular by Jack Jackson, Billy Cotton and Henry Hall. The chorus is mostly sung as a round and the verses not sung.

Ruth Madoc, as Gladys Pugh, sang the chorus in a 1982 episode of the BBC TV situation comedy, Hi-de-Hi! ("The Pay Off"), which was set in a holiday camp in the late 1950s.

== Sources ==
Original sheet music: "Horsey! Horsey!" Published by The Sun Music Co. Ltd. London WC2 and printed in London England by The Compton Printing Works (London) Ltd.
