= Ten Years of Toys =

Ten Years Of Toys

Compilation album by Toy Dolls
- Released: 1989
- Recorded: 1979–1989
- Genre: Punk
- Length: 49:24
- Label: Neat Records
- Producer: Michael Algar, Keith Nichol

Toy Dolls chronology
Bare Faced Cheek (1987)	Ten Years Of Toys (1989)	Wakey Wakey (1989)

Professional ratings
Review scores
Source	Rating
Allmusic	4.5/5 stars

Ten Years Of Toys is a compilation album by English punk-rock group, Toy Dolls, released in 1989. The cover image was designed and photographed by Tony Gray (Neat Records).

== Track listing ==
All songs written by Michael "Olga" Algar, except where noted.

1. "Florence Is Deaf (But There's No Need To Shout)" - 3:35
2. "Glenda & The Test Tube Baby' - 3:16
3. "Idle Gossip" - 2:31
4. "Carol Dodds Is Pregnant" - 3:26
5. "Tommy Kowey's Car" - 2:39
6. "Peter Practice's Practice Place" - 3:07
7. "Deidre's A Slag" - 3:19
8. "Blue Suede Shoes" (Carl Perkins) - 2:10
9. "Dig That Groove Baby" - 2:51
10. "Lambrusco Kid" - 3:09
11. "Dougy Giro" - 3:14
12. "Bless You My Son" - 2:53
13. "My Girlfriend's Dad's A Vicar" - 1:12
14. "She Goes To Finos" - 3:07
15. "Harry Cross (A Tribute To Edna)" - 3:34
16. "Fiery Jack" - 2:54
17. "I've Got Asthma" (Bonus Track) - 2:27

== Personnel ==
- Michael "Olga" Algar - vocals, guitar
- Dean "Dean James" Robson - bass, vocals
- Martin "Marty" Yule - drums, vocals

The album also used a drum machine.
