= The Sun Has Got His Hat On =

1932 song by Noel Gay and Ralph Butler

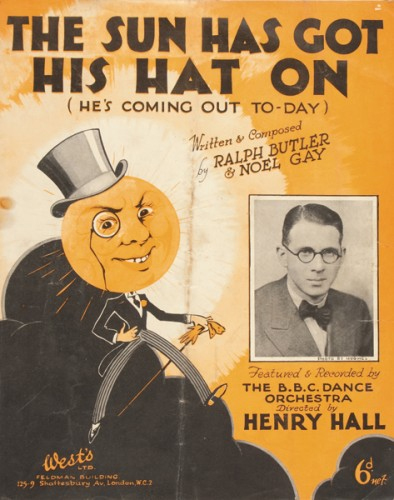

Song
- Written: 1932
- Recorded: 1932
- Genre: Show tune
- Composer: Noel Gay
- Lyricist: Ralph Butler

"The Sun Has Got His Hat On" is a song by Noel Gay and Ralph Butler. It was originally recorded in 1932 by two popular UK dance bands – Ambrose and his Orchestra, with vocals by Sam Browne, and by the Henry Hall BBC Dance Orchestra with vocals by Val Rosing. It later gained popular recognition after its appearance in the 1985 version of the musical Me and My Girl.

== Controversy over lyrics ==
In the original 1932 version of the song, the second verse contains the lines

He's been tanning niggers out in Timbuktu
Now he's coming back to do the same to you

Use of the word "nigger" was considered socially acceptable by British audiences in the 1930s, but is generally regarded as offensive today. The word is found in both the Ambrose and Henry Hall recordings of the song. In the Jonathan King version, released in 1971 under the artist name "Nemo", the line was changed to "He's been tanning Negroes". Modern performances of the song have instead included lines such as "He's been roasting peanuts" (written by Stephen Fry for his 1984 revival of Me and My Girl).

When Calendar, an ITV1 news programme, broadcast a version of the song with the word in May 2012, a complaint was made to Ofcom. ITV Yorkshire described the incident as an "unintended mistake" and the matter was considered to be resolved after an apology.

In May 2014, a listener complained after BBC Radio Devon presenter David Lowe played the Ambrose version of the song with the controversial word during his show on 27 April. He said he had not realised that the 1932 recording contained the word. Lowe was forced to resign, and although later offered his job back, he did not return.
