= Dig That Groove Baby =

Studio album by Toy Dolls
- Released: March 1983
- Recorded: February 1983
- Studio: Guardian Studios, Pity Me, County Durham
- Genre: Punk rock, Oi!
- Length: 34:02
- Label: Volume Records
- Producer: Toy Dolls and Terry Gavaghan

Toy Dolls chronology
Dig That Groove Baby (1983)	A Far Out Disc (1985)

Dig That Groove Baby is the first full-length album by the punk band Toy Dolls, released in 1983. It is considered by many fans to be the best work by the band and contains future live staples such as "Nellie the Elephant" and "Fiery Jack". The song "Dig That Groove Baby" is included in the 2002 video game Tony Hawk's Pro Skater 4.

== Recording ==
"We recorded in Durham, in a terraced house, in a little town called Pity Me... crazy name, eh? It took only three days to record and mix, so there was no time to fix mistakes. Happy Bob recorded his drum bits whilst on a lunch break from a local hospital where he worked."

— Michael Algar referring to the recording sessions.

The album was recorded in February 1983 at Guardian Studios, which were located in a terraced house in the village of Pity Me in County Durham. The album only took three days to record and mix, which left no time to fix any mistakes. The rushed production also meant that Happy Bob recorded his drum parts while on a lunch break from a local hospital that he worked at.

== Songs ==
Algar said "My favourite songs on it are "Dougy Giro" (it's written from the heart and it's completely true; we knew Dougy well,) and also "Glenda and the Test Tube Baby" (I really love the chorus, it has minor chords which I like a lot, and it's one of our best)"

== Reception ==
Professional ratings
Review scores
Source	Rating
Allmusic	3/5 stars

In his 2004 book Burning Britain: The History of UK Punk 1980–1984, music journalist Ian Glasper called the album "brilliant" and said it "set the madcap tone that the Toy Dolls would become well loved for." Algar said that "I actually think the album has aged very well, and it's always sounded fresh–unlike some of the garbage we have written. It's the most special album for me anyway, because it was our first, but it's also one of the best."

== Track listing ==
All writing by Michael "Olga" Algar, except where noted.

1. "Theme Tune" – 0:20
2. "Dig That Groove Baby" – 3:00
3. "Dougy Giro" – 3:16
4. "Spiders in the Dressing Room" – 1:56
5. "Glenda and the Test Tube Baby" – 3:15 (Referring to a storyline in Crossroads)
6. "Up the Garden Path" – 2:43
7. "Nellie the Elephant" (Ralph Butler, Peter Hart) – 3:27 (1984 version - 3:00)
8. "Poor Davey" – 3:22
9. "Stay Mellow" – 2:18
10. "Queen Alexandra Road Is Where She Said She'd Be, But Was She There to Meet Me... No Chance" – 2:17
11. "Worse Things Happen At Sea" – 2:39
12. "Blue Suede Shoes" (Carl Perkins) – 2:16
13. "Fiery Jack" – 2:53
14. "Theme Tune" – 0:20

== Personnel ==
- Michael "Olga" Algar - vocals, guitar
- Phillip "Flip" Dugdale - bass
- Robert "Happy Bob" Kent - drums
