= Ralph Butler =

British songwriter (1886–1969)

Ralph Thomas Butler (12 October 1886 – 8 April 1969) was a British songwriter, responsible for the lyrics of many popular songs of the 1930s and later, mostly with comic or novelty elements.

He was active as a songwriter from the late 1920s until the mid-1950s. Among his most famous songs were "All By Yourself In The Moonlight" (1929), published under the pseudonym Jay Wallis, which reportedly sold over a million copies; "Let’s Sing The Cuddly Song" (written with Julian Wright, 1929); "The Sun Has Got His Hat On" (1932), "Run, Rabbit, Run" (1939), and "Hey! Little Hen" (1941), all co-written with Noel Gay; "Let's All Go To The Music Hall" (1934), written with Harry Tilsley and Lawrence Wright; "There's A Lovely Lake In London" (1935), with Tolchard Evans and Stanley Damerell; "Horsey Horsey" (1938), with Paddy Roberts; "Come And Have A Drink At The Victory Arms" (1941), with Tolchard Evans; and "Nellie the Elephant" (1956), written with Peter Hart. Another song, also co-written with Noel Gay, "We Don't Know Where We're Going" (1944), was used to great effect during war scenes in the movie Overlord.

He died in 1969 in a London hospital, at the age of 82.
