= Noel Gay =

British composer (1898–1954)

- Born: Reginald Moxon Armitage; 15 July 1898; Wakefield, Yorkshire, England
- Died: 4 March 1954 (aged 55)
- Other name: Stanley Hill
- Education: Christ's College, Cambridge
- Occupations: Songwriter; composer
- Style: Musical theatre
- Children: Richard Armitage; Angela Armitage

Reginald Moxon Armitage (15 July 1898 – 4 March 1954) known professionally as Noel Gay was a British composer of popular music of the 1930s and 1940s whose output comprised 45 songs as well as the music for 28 films and 26 London shows. Sheridan Morley has commented that he was "the closest Britain ever came to a local Irving Berlin". He is best known for the musical, Me and My Girl.

== Early life ==
Armitage was born in Wakefield, Yorkshire, England. He was educated at Queen Elizabeth Grammar School before obtaining a scholarship at the age of 15 to attend the Royal College of Music in London, after which he attended university. A precocious talent, he had deputised for the choirmaster of Wakefield Cathedral from the age of eight, becoming honorary deputy organist at twelve. He had become music director and organist at St. Anne's Church in London's Soho district by the age of eighteen, prior a brief period of military service during the First World War and then studied at Christ's College, Cambridge.

== Career ==
Whilst at Cambridge, Armitage's interest in religious music and composition declined as that in musical comedy grew. He began writing popular songs, using the stage name Noel Gay. According to Morley the name was derived "from a sign he read on a London bus in 1924: 'NOEL Coward and Maisie GAY in a new revue'." His pseudonym of Stanley Hill was used from time to time for his more sentimental work. After contributing to revues such as Stop Press he was commissioned to write the entire score and lyrics for André Charlot's 1926 revue. His next show was Clowns in Clover, which starred Cicely Courtneidge and Jack Hulbert, a husband-and-wife team of the time.

Gay's career blossomed due to his talent for writing catchy, popular melodies in styles ranging from music hall to operetta.

His most famous show, for which he contributed the music but not the lyrics, was Me and My Girl. This originally opened in 1937 at the Victoria Palace Theatre, London and, after a shaky start, gained popularity when the BBC broadcast it live on radio on 13 January 1938. It starred Lupino Lane as Bill Snibson and it ran for 1,646 performances despite being bombed out of two theatres. The "showstopper" in that work was "The Lambeth Walk" which has the distinction of being the only popular song to be the subject of a leader in The Times. In October 1938 one of its leaders read "While dictators rage and statesmen talk, all Europe dances – to 'The Lambeth Walk'." The show was revived in 1952 and again in 1984, when the book was revised by Stephen Fry and came to include some of Gay's own songs. The latter production ran for eight years, initially at the Haymarket Theatre in Leicester and then at the Adelphi Theatre in London, before going on tour throughout Britain and transferring to Broadway.

Gay went on to write songs for revues by The Crazy Gang, and for star artists like Gracie Fields, Flanagan and Allen and George Formby, as well as penning popular World War II songs such as "Run, Rabbit, Run" (with lyrics by Ralph Butler). He wrote two songs for the 1938 comedy film Save a Little Sunshine.

After the war, his musical output diminished and he concentrated more on production, in part because of increasing deafness and also because the fashion for cheerful Cockney-themed songs was on the wane.

He had created Noel Gay Music in 1938 as a business vehicle. It now forms a part of the Noel Gay Organisation which includes divisions for television and theatre and is a significant British showbusiness agency, under the day-to-day control of his family.

His son, Richard Armitage, set up the Noel Gay Artists agency and became an influential talent agent.

He died from cancer on 4 March 1954.

== Shows ==
Gay contributed to numerous shows, almost all of them musical comedies or revues. Grove Music Online lists the following, except where the genre is stated as uncertain or as pantomime:

Year	Name	Comedy/Revue	Notes
1926	The Charlot Show of 1926	R	
1927	Clowns in Clover	R	
1931	Hold My Hand	C	
1931	Folly To Be Wise	R	included The King's Horses
1932	She Couldn't Say No		Uncertain genre
1933	That's A Pretty Thing	C	Rev. as La-Di-Da-Di-Da, 1943
1935	Jack O'Diamonds	C	Rev. as Susie, 1942
1935	Love Laughs	C	
1935	Stop Press	R	
1936	O-Kay for Sound		Book: Bob Weston & Bert Lee; music: Noel Gay, Harris Weston, Michael Carr & Jimmy Kennedy. Included The Fleet's in Port Again
1937	Me and My Girl	C	Filmed as The Lambeth Walk, 1939
1938	Wild Oats	C	
1939	The Little Dog Laughed		London Palladium Revue
1940	Lights Up	R	included Let The People Sing, Only A Glass of Champagne, You've Done Something to My Heart, The Girl Who Loves a Soldier
1940	Present Arms	C	
1942	Gangway	R	
1943	The Love Racket	C	
1944	Meet Me Victoria	C	
1944	Ring Time	C	
1946	Sweetheart Mine	C	
1948	Bob's Your Uncle	C	
1949	Aladdin		Score for pantomime)

== Songs ==
Among Noel Gay's songs were the following, sourced from US Library of Congress copyright catalogues and the catalogue of the National Library of Australia as indicated.

Year	Song	From	Lyrics	Music	Lyrics & Music	Source
1929	Tondeleyo	White Cargo (film – this was the first song to be used in a British talkie)	Stanley Hill (Noel Gay)	Noel Gay		NLA
1931	Girl of a Million Dreams		Jos. Geo. Gilbert	Noel Gay		LCC 1931
1931	Mrs Elizabeth Brown		Jos. Geo. Gilbert	Noel Gay		LCC 1931
1931	The King's Horses and The King's Men				Noel Gay & Harry Graham	LCC 1931
1931	Laughing at the Rain		Jos. Geo. Gilbert	Noel Gay		LCC 1931
1931	Goddess of the Moon	The Chinese Bungalow			Noel Gay	LCC 1931
1931	I Want The World To Know That I Belong To You	On with the Show	Jos. Geo. Gilbert	Noel Gay		LCC 1931
1931	The Pied Piper of Hamelin	Hold My Hand	Desmond Carter & Noel Gay	Noel Gay		LCC 1932; NLA
1931	Hold My Hand	Hold My Hand	Harry Graham		Maurice Elwin & Noel Gay	LCC 1932
1931	Dearest, It's You		Jos. Geo. Gilbert / Benny Davis	Noel Gay		LCC 1932
1931	Nobody's Baby Is Somebody's Baby Now		Gus Kahn	Noel Gay		LCC 1932
1931	Ali Baba's Camel				Noel Gay	NLA
1932	Land of Love and Laughter		Archie Gottler	Noel Gay		LCC 1932
1932	Turn on the Music		Noel Gay & Desmond Carter	Noel Gay		LCC 1932
1932	Thou Shalt Not		Archie Gottler	Noel Gay		LCC 1932
1932	All for the Love of A Lady		Archie Gottler / J P Long	Noel Gay		LCC 1932
1932	The Sun Has Got His Hat On				Ralph Butler & Noel Gay	LCC 1932
1932	Round The Marble Arch				Ralph Butler & Noel Gay	LCC 1932
1932	Lovely Little Silhouette		Archie Gottler	Noel Gay		LCC 1932
1932	I Don't Want To Go To Bed		Stanley Lupino	Noel Gay		NLA
1932	I've Found The Right Girl / Oh What A Girl				Stanley Lupino & Noel Gay	NLA
1933	La-di-da-di-da	That's A Pretty Thing	Desmond Carter	Noel Gay		LCC 1934
1933	I'm Hitching My Wagon To You	That's A Pretty Thing	Desmond Carter	Noel Gay		LCC 1934
1933	I Took My Harp to a Party		Desmond Carter	Noel Gay		LCC 1934
1933	Why Can't We	You Made Me Love You (film)	Clifford Grey	Noel Gay		LCC 1934
1933	The Song You Gave To Me		Clifford Grey & Noel Gay	Noel Gay		NLA
1933	Letting in the Sunshine				Noel Gay	NLA
1933	One Little Kiss From You		Clifford Grey	Noel Gay		NLA
1933	There's Something About A Soldier	Soldiers of the King (film)			Noel Gay	NLA
1933	The Moment I Saw You	Soldiers of the King (film)	Clifford Grey	Noel Gay		NLA
1934	Fit For Anything		Desmond Carter	Noel Gay		LCC 1934
1934	Happy	Happy (film)			Stanley Lupino & Noel Gay	LCC 1934
1934	Who's Been Polishing The Sun?	The Camels Are Coming (film)			Noel Gay	NLA
1934	I'll Pray For You		Roy King & Stanley Hill (Noel Gay)		Jos. Geo. Gilbert & Noel Gay	NLA
1935	Time	Love Laughs!	Desmond Carter	Noel Gay		NLA
1935	All for a Shilling A Day	Where's My Man?	Clifford Grey & Noel Gay	Noel Gay		NLA
1936	The Fleet's in Port Again	O-Kay For Sound (and as film, 1937)			Noel Gay	NLA
1936	Let's Have A Tiddly at the Milk Bar				Noel Gay	NLA
1937	Red, White and Blue				Noel Gay	NLA
1937	The Lambeth Walk		Douglas Furber	Noel Gay		NLA
1937	Me and My Girl		Douglas Furber	Noel Gay		NLA
1937	Leaning on a Lamp-post				Noel Gay	NLA
1937	Won't You Buy My Pretty Flowers		Jack Meskill & Noel Gay	Noel Gay		NLA
1938	Love Makes The World Go Round	These Foolish Things			Stanley Hill (Noel Gay)	NLA
1939	Did You Go Down Lambeth Way?				Noel Gay	NLA
1939	You've Done Something to My Heart	Lights Up	Frank Eyton & Ian Grant	Noel Gay		NLA
1939	Run, Rabbit, Run	The Little Dog Laughed	Ralph Butler & Noel Gay	Noel Gay		NLA
1939	The Girl Who Loves A Soldier		Ralph Butler & Noel Gay	Noel Gay		NLA
1939	Let The People Sing		Frank Eyton & Ian Grant	Noel Gay		NLA
1939	Birthday of the Little Princess				Noel Gay	NLA
1939	The Moon Remembered But You Forgot				Frank Eyton & Noel Gay	NLA
1939	Fare Thee Well				Jimmy Campbell, Frank Eyton & Noel Gay	NLA
1940	All Over The Place	Sailors Three (film)	Frank Eyton & Noel Gay	Noel Gay		NLA
1940	Oh What A Wonderful Night We've Had Tonight		Ralph Butler & Noel Gay	Noel Gay		NLA
1940	Oh! Buddy, I'm in Love		Ralph Butler & Noel Gay	Noel Gay		NLA
1940	Whose Little What's-it Are You?				Frank Eyton & Noel Gay	NLA
1940	Moonlight Avenue				Jos. Geo. Gilbert, Jimmy Campbell & Noel Gay	NLA
1941	Come Happy Day				Bill Hutter & Noel Gay	NLA
1941	Mr Brown of London Town				Reginald Arkell & Noel Gay	NLA
1941	Hey! Little Hen				Ralph Butler & Noel Gay	NLA
1941	She's in Love with a Soldier				David Heneker & Noel Gay	NLA
1941	I'd Never Fall in Love Again				Ralph Butler & Noel Gay	NLA
1941	Oh! How He Misses His Missus (Since He Became A Military Man)				Ralph Butler & Noel Gay	NLA
1941	He Wants To Be A Pilot				Muriel Watson, Jack Denby & Noel Gay	NLA
1941	Who Are You A-Shovin' Of?				Raymond Moore & Noel Gay	NLA
1942	The First Waltz				Ralph Butler & Noel Gay	NLA
1943	Happy Days, Happy Months, Happy Years				Frank Eyton & Noel Gay	NLA
1943	Sitting on a Cloud				Ralph Butler & Noel Gay	NLA
1943	I'm Mad at Myself				Joe Lubin & Noel Gay	NLA
1943	Why Say Goodbye				Tommy Angel, Joyce Cochrane & Noel Gay	NLA
1944	We Don't Know Where We're Going				Ralph Butler & Noel Gay	NLA
1945	The Too-rie on His Bonnet		George Brown	Noel Gay		NLA
1946	When Alice Blue Gown Met Little Boy Blue		Arnold, Ralph Butler & Simpson	Noel Gay		NLA
1949	I'll Always Love You		Frank Eyton & Noel Gay	Noel Gay		NLA
1950	My Thanks To You		Norman Newell	Noel Gay		NLA

Some of his songs featured in the film Overlord

== Bibliography ==
- Dickinson, Stephen (1999). Marigold: The Music of Billy Mayerl. Oxford: Oxford University Press.
- Ganzl, Kurt (1986). The British Musical Theatre. Oxford: Oxford University Press.
