= Fat Bob's Feet =

Studio album by Toy Dolls
- Released: 1991
- Recorded: December 1990
- Genre: Punk
- Length: 34:49
- Label: Receiver Records
- Producer: Michael Algar

Toy Dolls chronology
| 22 Tunes Live From Tokyo (1990) | Fat Bob's Feet (1991) | Absurd-Ditties (1993) |

Professional ratings
Review scores
| Source | Rating |
|---|---|
| Allmusic | 4/5 stars |

Fat Bob's Feet is a full-length album by the Punk band Toy Dolls. It is one of the more popular pieces recorded by the band and included such punk favourites as Bitten by a Bed Bug, The Sphinx Stinks and bonus single A-side Turtles Crazy! that wasn't included in the original album track list. Kids In Tyne & Wear is a reworking of Kim Wilde's classic Kids in America, one most often covered songs by the punk rock bands. Fat Bob's Feet is a rare late The Toy Dolls album that doesn't contain any classic/symphony instrumental adaptation.

== Track listing ==
All tracks by Michael Algar

1. "Gloomy Intro/Toy Doll Tonic" – 0:55
2. "Fat Bob's Feet!" – 2:46
3. "We Quit the Cavalry" – 2:59
4. "The Sphinx Stinks" – 2:18
5. "Rodney's Memory" – 2:35
6. "Olga Crack Corn" – 1:09
7. "Bitten by a Bed Bug" – 3:02
8. "Kids In Tyne & Wear" – 3:15
9. "Frankie's Got the Blues" – 2:35
10. "A Bunch O' Fairies" – 2:43
11. "Yellow Burt" – 1:05
12. "Back in '79" – 2:51
13. "The Coppers Copt Ken's Cash!" – 2:30
14. "Toy Doll Tonic/Gloomy Outro" – 1:22
15. "Turtle Crazy!" – 2:44

== Personnel ==
- Michael "Olga" Algar - vocals, guitar
- John "K'Cee" Casey - bass, vocals
- Martin "Marty" Yule - drums, vocals
