= Idle Gossip =

Studio album by Toy Dolls
- Released: August 1986
- Recorded: July 1986
- Genre: Punk rock, Oi!
- Length: 36:13
- Label: Volume Records
- Producer: Michael Chapman

Toy Dolls chronology
A Far Out Disc (1985)	Idle Gossip (1986)	Bare Faced Cheek (1987)

Professional ratings
Review scores
Source	Rating
Allmusic	link

Idle Gossip is a full-length album by the punk band Toy Dolls.

== Track listing ==
All writing by Michael "Olga" Algar.

1. "Idle Gossip" – 2:33
2. "Do You Wanna Be Like Dougy Bell" – 2:39
3. "The Lambrusco Kid" – 3:28
4. "You Won't Be Merry On A North Sea Ferry" – 3:09
5. "Harry Cross (A Tribute To Edna)" – 3:44 (referring to a storyline in Brookside)
6. "Geordie's Gone To Jail" – 3:36
7. "Silly Billy" – 2:09
8. "If You're In A Pop Group You'll End Up Paying A Fortune Practicing At Peter Practice's Practice Place" – 2:56
9. "PC Stoker" – 2:56
10. "I Tried To Trust Tracey" – 3:40
11. "Keith's A Thief" – 2:05
12. "I'll Get Even With Steven (Steve Is Tender)" – 3:18

== Personnel ==
- Michael "Olga" Algar - Vocals, Guitar
- Dean (James) Robson - Bass, Vocals
- Graham "Teddy" Edmundson - Drums, Vocals
