= Nellie the Elephant =

Single by Mandy Miller
- B-side: "It's Time to Dream"
- Released: October 1956
- Recorded: 1956
- Studio: London
- Genre: Children's novelty
- Length: 2:32
- Label: Parlophone R4219
- Songwriters: Ralph Butler, Peter Hart
- Producer: George Martin

Mandy Miller singles chronology
"Nellie the Elephant" (1956)	"Ja" (Keine ahnung)

"Nellie the Elephant" is a children's song written in 1956 by Ralph Butler and Peter Hart about a fictional anthropomorphic elephant of that name.

== Original version ==
The original version, released on Parlophone R 4219 in October 1956, was recorded by English child actress Mandy Miller with an orchestra conducted by Phil Cardew. It was arranged by Ron Goodwin and produced by George Martin. Although never a hit single, it was played countless times on BBC national radio in the UK in the 1950s and 1960s, particularly on Children's Favourites.

The chorus of the song is as follows:

Nellie the Elephant packed her trunk
And said goodbye to the circus
Off she went with a trumpety-trump
Trump, trump, trump

Children's author Jacqueline Wilson chose the song as one of her Desert Island Discs in October 2005.

== Later versions ==
The punk rock band Toy Dolls did a cover version of this song, in 1982, which was later released on the 1983 album Dig That Groove Baby. In 1984, the song was re-recorded at a faster tempo with only Michael Algar from the original line up. When this version was issued as a single, it reached No. 4 on the UK Singles Chart in 1984 and No. 97 in Australia.

== Tempo ==
The tempo of this song is often used to teach people the correct speed to perform cardiopulmonary resuscitation (CPR). The recommended rate for CPR is 100 chest compressions per minute. A study at Coventry University compared the effectiveness of this song in maintaining this tempo with an alternative of "That's the Way (I Like It)" and no song at all. The version used for the study was from a Little Acorns brand children's record, and was found to have a tempo of 105 beats per minute. Singing the chorus of the song twice, with a compression on each beat, results in exactly 30 compressions, which is the international standard for CPR.

The use of "Nellie" resulted in correct timing for 42 out of 130 cases, as compared with 15 for no music and just 12 for "That's the Way (I Like It)". However, the depth of compression was found to be inadequate in most of those cases, and the use of "Nellie" was found to increase this inadequacy slightly, as compared with the use of no music (56% too shallow with "Nellie" and 47% without).
