= Toy Dolls =

English punk rock band

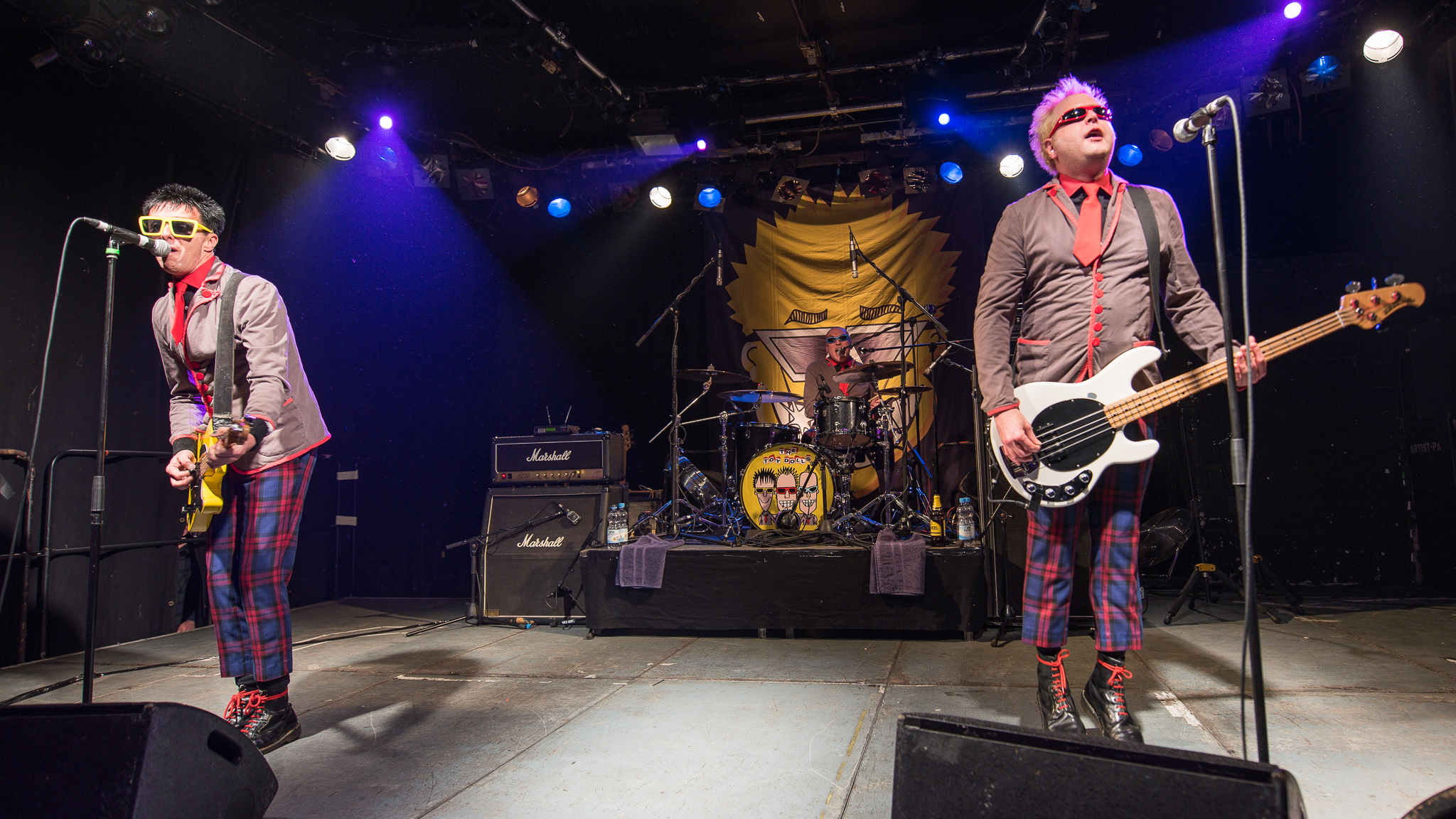
- Toy Dolls in 2017

Background information
- Origin: Sunderland, Tyne and Wear, England
- Genres: Punk rock; Oi!; punk pathetique; new wave
- Years active: 1979–present
- Label: Secret Records
- Members: Michael Algar; Duncan Redmonds; Tom Blyth
- Past members: List: Philip Dugdale Colin Scott Paul Hudson Dean Robson Trevor Brewis Graham Edmundson Robert Kent Frederick Robertson Nick Buck Barry Warne Alan "Dicka" Dixon Malcolm Dick Pete Robson Paul Smith Ernest Algar Kevin Scott Martin "Marty" Yule John Casey Gary Dunn Michael Rebbig Dave Nuttall Steve Mallinson Kevin Beston Richard "Dickie" Hammond
- Website: www.thetoydolls.com

The Toy Dolls are an English punk rock band formed in 1979. They are best known for their sole UK hit, a punk-rock cover of "Nellie the Elephant". The Toy Dolls' songs expressed a sense of fun, such as "Yul Brynner Was a Skinhead", "My Girlfriend's Dad's a Vicar" and "James Bond Lives Down Our Street", and songs titles often use alliteration, such as "Peter Practice's Practice Place", "Fisticuffs in Frederick Street", "Neville Is a Nerd", and "Quick to Quit the Quentin".

Their albums usually include a cover version of a well-known hit song, usually sped up to the usual punk rock tempo. Covers have included "Blue Suede Shoes", "Toccata in Dm", "No Particular Place to Go", "Sabre Dance", "Livin' La Vida Loca", "Lazy Sunday", "I'm Gonna Be (500 Miles)", "She's So Modern" and "The Final Countdown". They have also recorded parodies of popular songs, such as "The Kids in Tyne and Wear (Kids in America)" and "The Devil Went Down to Scunthorpe (The Devil Went Down to Georgia)". Their albums often start with a short intro with a catchy guitar riff, and end with an outro, which is usually a slightly longer variation of the intro riff. Kazoos are also prominent in many of their songs.

Most of the band members have nicknames, and are rarely seen without their cartoonish rectangular sunglasses (although they appeared bare-eyed on the One More Megabyte album cover).

== Career ==
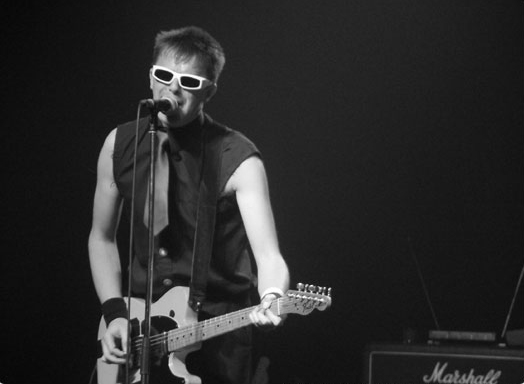
Michael "Olga" Algar of The Toy Dolls on stage in 2005

The Toy Dolls formed as a quartet featuring vocalist Pete "Zulu" Robson; guitarist Michael "Olga" Algar (born 21 September 1962, South Shields, England); drummer Colin "Mr. Scott" Scott; and bassist Phillip "Flip" Dugdale. After just a few gigs, Zulu left to form his own band and was replaced by Paul "Hud" Hudson on vocals for one concert. After Hud's departure, the Toy Dolls became a trio, with guitarist Olga assuming permanent vocal duties.

Scott left the band in 1980 and was replaced by Dean James for four months over the summer of 1980. James later returned to the band from 1985 to 1988 as bassist. Flip left in 1983, marking the beginning of a revolving door of drummers and bassists that would characterise the Toy Dolls line-up over the years (with Olga as the mainstay and only original member). In 1984, Zulu returned to the line-up as bassist/backing vocalist, but departed again less than a year later.

They were initially grouped with the Oi! scene, and have also been classified as punk pathetique. One reason they are associated with Oi! is that they were championed by Garry Bushell, who was very involved with Oi! bands such as Angelic Upstarts (whom The Toy Dolls later supported on their first national tour). In 1980, a Sunderland businessman financed the Toy Dolls' debut single, "Tommy Kowey's Car" with "She Goes To Fino's" on the B-side. The single quickly sold out its initial pressing of 500 copies, but the band could not afford to press any more, making the single a collector's item. Around the time the band signed to Volume, Olga moved to Newton Hall, in north Durham, which led to the song "Livin' on Newton Hall".

For Christmas 1982, they released their punk rendition of "Nellie the Elephant", a classic children's song, which hit No. 1 in the UK Indie Chart. In 1983, they released their debut album Dig That Groove Baby. In 1984, their re-issue of "Nellie the Elephant" reached No. 4 in the UK Singles Chart and stayed in the chart for 14 weeks. Their 1985 album, A Far Out Disc, reached No. 71 in the UK Albums Chart.

Since then, the band has continued to release albums and to tour widely, mainly across continental Europe, South America and Japan. After a gap of fourteen years since their last gig in Britain, 2007 saw a string of UK dates taking in cities from Glasgow to London, including a "homecoming" for a show at Durham University.

The band released a best-of album, Ten Years of Toys. 1993 saw the popular live song "I'm a Telly Addict" on the album Absurd-Ditties. In 1997, the band released One More Megabyte, which featured references to computers, mainly in the lyrics of its title track, and in tracks like the outro track. A popular cover of Ricky Martin's "Livin' La Vida Loca" made its way onto Anniversary Anthems in 2000. The band's 2004 album Our Last Album? fooled fans in the anticipation up to its release that it was the band's last album. The outro track on the album stated that it was not.

To celebrate the band's twenty-fifth anniversary in 2004, the official biography, The Toy Dolls: From Fulwell to Fukuoka, was published by Ardra Press.

In 2006, The Toy Dolls contributed their cover version of "Toccata in Dm" to the album project Artists for Charity – Guitarists 4 the Kids, produced by Slang Productions, to assist World Vision Canada in helping underprivileged kids in need.

For their thirtieth anniversary in October 2009, the band received congratulatory messages from a selection of musicians, including Baz Warne from the Stranglers, TV Smith from the Adverts, Jake Burns from Stiff Little Fingers, and NOFX manager Kent Jamieson.

The Toy Dolls live shows consist of synchronized choreography, timed moves, dances, jumps, and spinning guitars.

The band's song "Nellie the Elephant" was used by Tesco in their toy advertisement in October 2014.

The Album After the Last One was released in 2012. The band has been on a "The Tour After the Last One" and started a range of Toy Dolls-themed real ales under the label "The Beer After the Last One".

In 2018, the band played one show in Montebello, Quebec, for the city's annual Rockfest music festival, marking the first time in the band's 38-year history that they played a show in Canada.

== Members ==
As of 2007, the band has had fourteen different drummers and twelve different bassists. Olga is the only remaining original member of the band. After Olga, drummer Martin Yule had the longest tenure in the band (1987–2000). Yule currently owns a record shop in Sunderland called Hot Rats. Former drummer Dave "the Nut" Nuttall owns Jalapeño Drums, a custom drum company based in Lancaster, Lancashire. The current lead singer/guitarist with the Stranglers, Baz Warne, also had a stint with the band. Olga has played bass on tours with the US punk band the Dickies, and also with the Adicts. Gary Dunn, former bassist of the Toy Dolls (1997–1999), teaches music at Harton Academy, and former drummer, Trevor "The Frog" Brewis, teaches music at Middlesbrough College, though Olga moved away from the northeast of England a number of years ago, and now lives in London.

Former member Michael Rebbig also played guitar for German punk band The Bates.

It has become a tradition to give a special nickname to every Toy Dolls member.

=== Current members ===
- Mike "Olga" Algar – lead vocals, guitar
- Jamie "The Other Jamie Oliver" Oliver – drums, vocals
- Thomas Woodford "Tommy Goober" Blyth – bass, vocals

=== Toy Dolls alumni ===
- Duncan Redmonds - drums, vocals
- Peter "Pete Zulu" Robson – bass guitar
- Phillip "Flip" Dugdale – bass
- Colin "Mr. Scott" Scott – drums
- Paul "Hud" Hudson – vocals
- Dean "Dean James" Robson – drums 1980, bass guitar 1985/88
- Trevor "Trevor the Frog" Brewis – drums
- Graham "Teddy Toy Doll" Edmundson – drums
- Robert "Happy Bob" Kent – drums
- Steve "Rubiboy" Mallinson – bass
- Frederick "Freddie Hotrock" Robertson – bass
- Nick Buck – drums
- Barry "Bonny Baz" Warne – bass
- Alan "Dirty Dicka" Nixon – drums
- Malcolm "Dicky" Dick – drums
- Paul "Little Paul" Smith – drums
- Ernest "Ernie" Algar – bass
- Kevin "Canny Kev" Scott – drums
- Martin "Marty" Yule – drums
- John "K'Cee" Casey – bass
- Richard "Dicky Hammond" Hammond – bass
- Gary "Gary Fun" Dunn – bass
- Suba – drums
- Kevin Appleton – Drums
- Michael "Reb" Rebbig – bass
- David "Dave the Nut" Nuttall – drums

== Discography ==
=== Studio albums ===
Year	Album
1983	Dig That Groove Baby
1985	A Far Out Disc
1986	Idle Gossip
1987	Bare Faced Cheek
1989	Ten Years of Toys
1989	Wakey Wakey
1991	Fat Bob's Feet
1993	Absurd-Ditties
1995	Orcastrated
1997	One More Megabyte
2000	Anniversary Anthems
2002	We're mad! The Anthology
2004	Our Last Album?
2012	The Album After the Last One
2015	Olgacoustic
2019	EPISODE XIII

=== Live albums ===
Year	Album
1990	Twenty Two Tunes Live from Tokyo
1999	On Stage in Stuttgart
2006	Treasured Tracks

=== Singles and EPs ===
- 1980: "Tommy Kowey's Car"
- 1981: Toy Dolls EP ("Tommy Koway's Car" [new version], "She's a Worky Ticket", "Everybody Jitterbug, "Teenager in Love" [excerpt], "I've Got Asthma")
- 1981: "Everybody Jitterbug"
- 1982: "Nellie the Elephant" – identical to the version on their first album, Dig That Groove Baby
- 1983: "Cheerio & Toodle Pip"
- 1983: "Alfie from the Bronx"
- 1984: "We're Mad" / "Deirdre's a Slag" (n.b.: 12-inch version was a triple A-side with "Rupert the Bear")
- 1984: "Nellie the Elephant" [re-recording] – No. 4 in the UK (14 weeks in chart); No. 39 in Germany (8 weeks in chart); No. 97 in Australia. No. 1 on the UK Independent Singles Chart (7 weeks at No. 1)
- 1985: "She Goes to Finos" / "Spiders in the Dressing Room" " – No. 93 in the UK (2 weeks in chart)
- 1985: "James Bond Lives Down Our Street"
- 1986: "Geordie's Gone to Jail"
- 1987: "Wipe Out" [Live]
- 1990: "Turtle Crazy"
- 1995: "Lazy Sunday Afternoon"
- 2000: "Livin' la Vida Loca"
