= Jane Summerhays =

American actress

Jane Summerhays (born October 11, 1944 in Salt Lake City, Utah) is an American actress known for her work on stage, screen, and film. Her television credits include guest roles on One Life to Live, All My Children, Tales from the Darkside, Working It Out, The Cosby Mysteries, New York News, Law & Order, Sex and the City, and Ed. Summerhays has also appeared in the 2001 film This Train in the role of Love and the 2005 film Backseat as the mother.

Summerhays is probably best known for her stage work. She first appeared as a member of the ensemble in the national tour of Nash at Nine in 1975. She next performed in the original 1976 Laurence Olivier Award winning London production of A Chorus Line as Sheila at the Drury Lane Theatre. In 1978, Summerhays was cast as Lady Kay Wellington in the national touring production of Oh, Kay! which included performances at the John F. Kennedy Center for the Performing Arts. She then reprised the role the following year at the Royal Alexandra Theatre in Toronto. Later that year Summerhays made her Broadway debut, replacing Kelly Bishop, who originated the part on Broadway, as Sheila in A Chorus Line. In 1979, she played the role of Jane in the Broadway production of Sugar Babies, replacing actress Ann Jillian who originated the part. Summerhays also was the understudy for the lead role of Ann in the production and got to perform the role on a few occasions. In 1980, she played the roles of Zelda Fitzgerald and Sylvia Beach in the American Place Theatre's production of Paris Lights. In 1981, she performed in a production of Hey, Look Me Over! at Avery Fisher Hall. In 1983, Summerhays returned to the Broadway production of A Chorus Line to once again play Sheila. In 1984, she appeared as Maria in On Approval at the Roundabout Theatre. In 1985, she played Jane and was the understudy for Ann in the national company tour of Sugar Babies. In 1986, Summerhays starred as Lady Jaqueline Carstone in the original Broadway production and Me and My Girl for which she received a Drama Desk Award and a Tony Award nomination. She remained with the production for three years. Over the next two decades Summerhays appeared in several more Broadway productions including the roles of Diana in Lend Me a Tenor, Elizabeth in Taking Steps, Cynthia in The Real Inspector Hound, the musical review Dream, Fritzie and Fraulein Kost in Cabaret, and Miss Madelaine True in The Wild Party. Summerhays also appeared in several Off-Broadway and regional theater productions including Sympathy Jones, Camila, Broadway Gypsies, Good News, and Promises, Promises.

== Recordings ==
- Me and My Girl, Decca Broadway, 1987
- The Wild Party, Decca Broadway, 2000
