= Mike Ockrent =

British stage director (1946–1999)

Ockrent

Michael Robert Ockrent (18 June 1946 – 2 December 1999) was a British stage director, well-known both for his Broadway musicals and smaller niche plays.

== Education ==
He was educated at Highgate School.

== Career ==
Through directing Educating Rita, The Nerd and Follies, he became an established figure in London theatre. In 1986 he made a successful transition to New York City with Me and My Girl that earned several Tony Award nominations. In later life Ockrent worked in film, mainly straight-to-TV movies.

== Personal life ==
In 1992 Ockrent worked with Susan Stroman on Crazy for You and other productions. They were married in 1996 and remained so until Ockrent's death from leukaemia in New York in 1999. Ockrent's son is the screenwriter and director Ben Ockrent.

== Legacy ==
A charitable trust now exists in his name. The trust aims to give access to theatre for children with cancer, involving nights at the theatre with visits backstage afterwards. It also funds leukaemia research, "both mainstream and 'alternative'".

== Credits ==
=== Filmography ===
- Shakespeare Lives! (1982) TV series (co-producer)
- Bestseller (1985) (TV) (director)
- Mrs. Capper's Birthday (1985) (TV) (a.k.a. Star Quality: Mrs. Capper's Birthday (UK)) (director)
- Dancin' Thru the Dark (1990) (director)
- Money for Nothing (1993/II) (TV) (a.k.a. Hot Millions (USA) or Screen One: Money for Nothing (UK: series title)) (director)
- A Christmas Carol (2004/I) (TV) (musical) (a.k.a. A Christmas Carol: The Musical (USA)) (screenplay)

=== Stage ===
- The Dead of Night by Stanley Eveling (1975)
- Once a Catholic (1979)
- The Nerd, Aldwych Theatre, London (1984) (starring Rowan Atkinson)
- Rowan Atkinson at the Atkinson (1986)
- Me and My Girl (1986–1989)
- Happy Birthday, Sir Larry (31 May 1987) an 80th birthday tribute to Lord Olivier
- Crazy for You (1991–1996) (Ockrent conceived the idea)
- A Christmas Carol (1995)
- Big (1996)
- King David (1997)

=== Novel ===
- Running Down Broadway (1992)

== Awards and nominations ==
Awards

- 1987 – Drama Desk Award Outstanding Book – Me and My Girl
- 1987 – Drama Desk Award Outstanding Director of a Musical – Me and My Girl

Nominations

- 1987 – Tony Award Best Book of a Musical – Me and My Girl (joint with L. Arthur Rose, Douglas Furber and Stephen Fry)
- 1987 – Tony Award Best Direction of a Musical – Me and My Girl
- 1992 – Drama Desk Award Best Direction of a Musical – Crazy for You
- 1992 – Drama Desk Award Outstanding Director of a Musical – Crazy for You
