= Michael Algar =

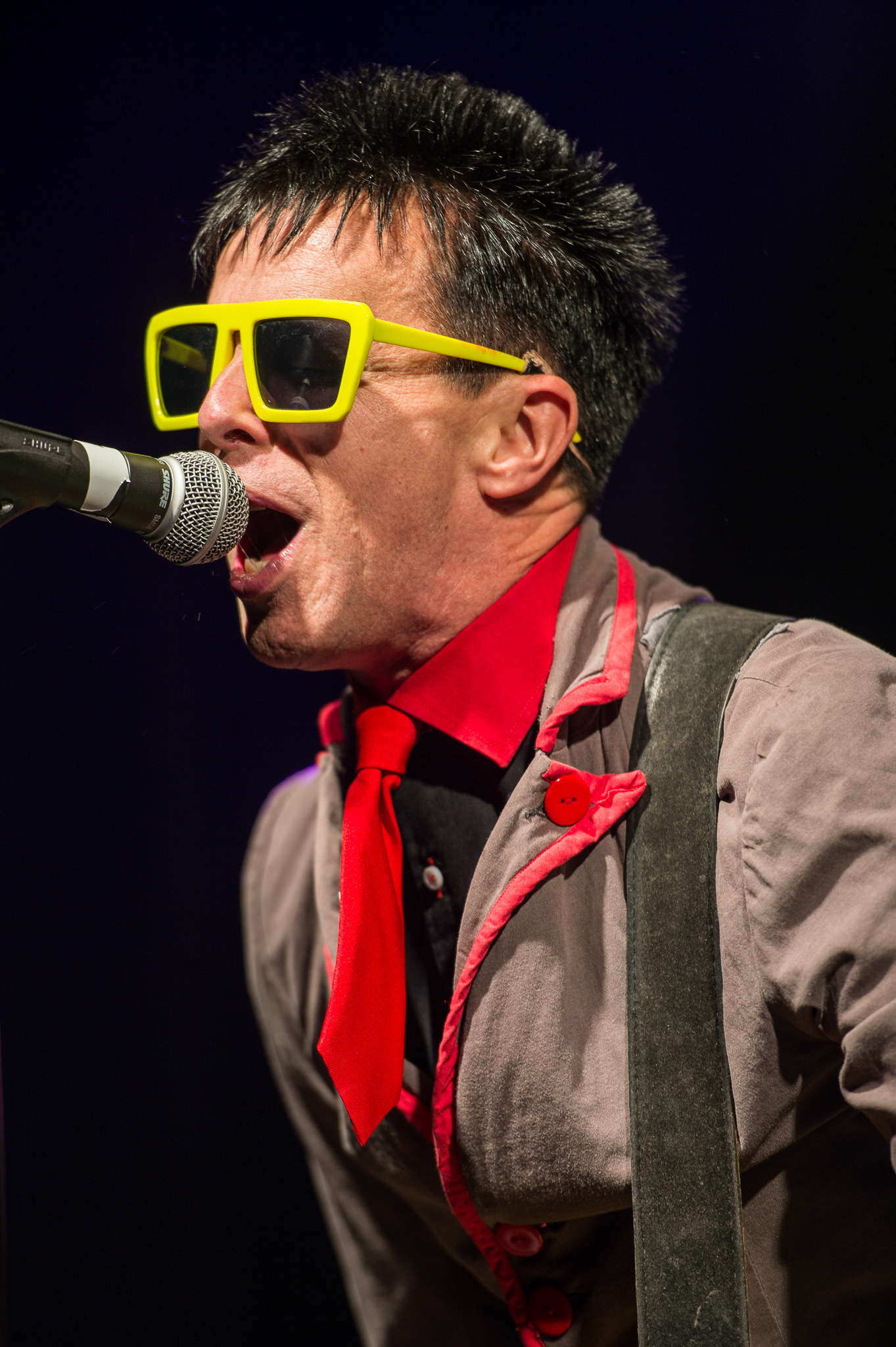
- Michael Algar in 2017

Background information
- Also known as: Olga
- Born: 21 September 1959 (age 66); South Shields, England
- Genres: Punk rock
- Occupations: Musician, songwriter, record producer
- Instruments: Vocals, guitar, bass
- Years active: 1979–present
- Labels: Secret Records Limited, Captain Oi!
- Member of: The Toy Dolls, Cockney Rejects, Monkey Mind
- Formerly of: The Dickies

Michael "Olga" Algar (born 21 September 1959 in Marsden, South Shields, England) is an English guitarist, singer and songwriter who fronts the band Toy Dolls and now plays with the Cockney Rejects. Mainly a lead/rhythm guitarist, Olga is also a songwriter and record producer. Algar lived in the City of Sunderland during most of his life before moving to Tokyo, Japan, in 2000. He then moved to central London in 2002 where he has lived since.

== Musical career ==
Michael “Olga” Algar, began playing music "around the age of 11 after seeing Mud, Sweet, Slade and Suzi Quatro on Top of the Pops, a UK pop TV show". He had started songwriting/composing by the age of 17. He played in various local bands including Straw Dogs and The Showbiz Kids before forming Toy Dolls in October 1979. Over their 47-year existence Toy Dolls have toured the world extensively and released numerous albums and singles. Olga has written all the band's albums which include such titles as Absurd-Ditties, Fat Bob's Feet, Idle Gossip and Anniversary Anthems. Following the debut album Dig That Groove Baby, the band had a top 10 single in the UK in 1984, "Nellie the Elephant", reaching number 4 in the UK Singles Chart. This was followed by the album A Far Out Disc reaching number 71 in the UK Albums Chart.

== Production ==
Olga has produced most of Toy Dolls' albums and also recordings for other artists too, including the double A side single "Take A Walk/Round, Round, Round" by Gem Archer of Beady Eye and Oasis and the albums Toy Doll and Tori Ningen by Japanese punk band Lolita No.18. In 2010 he was executive engineer on the album Crash & Burn by North East UK punk band Crashed Out.

The latest production from Olga is Episode XIII by Toy Dolls, released in 2019.

== TV and film soundtracks ==
Olga has written the music for various TV commercials, including Ready Brek (UK), Badoit mineral water (France) and Crazy Grape Pepsi Cola (Russia).

His music has been used on the soundtracks of Hollywood films, including Haggard: The Movie, Free Jimmy and the video game Tony Hawk's Pro Skater 4 and most recently the documentary Tony Hawk: Until the Wheels Fall Off.

Olga wrote the theme and incidental music for the TV rock/pop show Razzmatazz and the theme music for comedian Dave Gorman's Googlewhack Adventure DVD.

== Guitar playing ==
Prior to playing guitar, Olga first learned bass guitar and also plays kazoo.

Olga plays a yellow Fender Telecaster with a Seymour Duncan bridge pick up. The All Music Guide describes Olga as being "capable of jaw-droppingly fast guitar picking", and he is notable for being one of few punk guitarists to frequently take guitar solos.

Besides playing guitar with Toy Dolls, Olga has toured Europe, Japan and the USA as bass player with The Dickies, and features on their Live DVD An Evening with the Dickies recorded at The Wedgwood Rooms in Portsmouth UK July 2002. He also played bass on various US shows with The Adicts.

He made a guest appearance at the birthday show of Ginger from the Wildhearts at the Garage, London 17 December 2009.

He has been a guest guitarist on a number of artists recordings including the tracks "Can't Drink You Pretty" from the Yoni by Ginger from Wildhearts, "Aint Just Talkin bout Love" from The G7 album by German band Gigantor, "Keepin on Keepin on" from the album Uppers and Downers by The Yo-Yos, Japanese band Seventh Tarz Armstrong's album entitled The Tokyo City Big Nights, the track "Walk of Shame" from the album Poets on Payday by Norfolk Punk band Vanilla Pod, Japan based punk band Duncans Divas' album Up and at 'em, and on Peter and the Test Tube Babies album A Foot Full of Bullets on lead vocals on the song "Smiling Through The Tears".

Olga also appeared on lead vocals alongside Brian Johnson from (AC/DC) and John Miles, on the Geordie Aid single "Try Giving Everything" in 1985, for charity relating to Ethiopia. Another charity record that Olga appeared on was the album Guitarists 4 the Kids released in 2006.

In 2024 Olga was invited by Jeff 'Stinky' Turner to join the Cockney Rejects

== Musical influences ==
Olga finds inspiration from "everyday life, girlfriends, next door neighbours and things, rather than music", for his songwriting. His early musical influences include "Dr. Feelgood, Chuck Berry, Sweet, Slade, Mud, SLF, Sham 69, The Jam, The Skids", among punk rock music in general.
