= A Far Out Disc =

Studio album by Toy Dolls
- Released: April 1985
- Recorded: 1985
- Genre: Punk rock, Oi!
- Length: 38:39
- Label: Volume
- Producer: Toy Dolls; Terry Gavaghan

Toy Dolls chronology
Dig That Groove Baby (1983)	A Far Out Disc (1985)	Idle Gossip (1986)

Professional ratings
Review scores
Source	Rating
Allmusic	link

A Far Out Disc is a full-length album by the punk band Toy Dolls. Song "Razzmatazz Intro." was the theme tune in several series of the British TV show Razzmatazz.

== Track listing ==
Source: Official Site

All tracks are written by Michael "Olga" Algar, except where noted

No.	Title	Length
1.	"A Far Out Theme Tune"	0:20
2.	"She Goes to Finos"	3:37
3.	"Razzmatazz Intro."	1:44
4.	"Modern Schools Of Motoring"	3:40
5.	"Carol Dodds Is Pregnant"	3:25
6.	"You & A Box Of Handkerchiefs"	2:06
7.	"Bless You My Son"	2:30
8.	"My Girlfriend's Dad's A Vicar"	1:09
9.	"Come Back Jackie"	3:07
10.	"Do You Want To Finish... Or What?!"	2:34
11.	"Commercial Break"	1:42
12.	"'Chartbuster'/Razzmatazz Outro."	2:48
13.	"We're Mad"	4:52
14.	"Wipe Out!" (Patrick Connolly, Jim Fuller, Ron Wilson)	2:04
15.	"Florence Is Deaf (But There's No Need To Shout)"	2:34
16.	"A Far Out Theme Tune"	0:27

Bonus tracks on re-release
No.	Title	Length
17.	"Deidree's A Slag"
18.	"Rupert The Bear"
19.	"Nellie The Elephant" (1984 version)
20.	"Fisticuffs In Frederick Street"

== Personnel ==
- Michael "Olga" Algar – Vocals, Guitar
- Pete "Zulu" Robson – Bass, Vocals
- Paul "Little" Smith – Drums, Vocals
