= Me and My Girl =

Musical premiered in 1937

- 1986 Broadway Cast Recording
- Music: Noel Gay
- Lyrics: Douglas Furber; L. Arthur Rose
- Book: Douglas Furber; L. Arthur Rose
- Productions: 1937 West End; 1939 U.K. Television; 1952 West End revival 1985 West End revival 1986 Broadway; 2006 UK tour
- Awards: 1985 Olivier Award Musical of the Year

Me and My Girl is a musical with music by Noel Gay and its original book and lyrics by Douglas Furber and L. Arthur Rose. The story, set in the late 1930s, tells of an unapologetically unrefined Cockney gentleman named Bill Snibson, who learns that he is the 14th heir to the Earl of Hareford. The action is set in Hampshire, and in Mayfair and Lambeth in London.

The musical had a successful original run in the West End in 1937, and was turned into a film in 1939, titled The Lambeth Walk, named after one of the show's songs. "The Lambeth Walk" was also the subject of a news story in The Times of October 1938: "While dictators rage and statesmen talk, all Europe dances – to The Lambeth Walk." The production also included the song "The Sun Has Got His Hat On".

After returning to the West End briefly in 1952, the musical's book received a revision by Stephen Fry with Mike Ockrent in the 1980s. The show was revised again and revived in the West End in 1984, where it received two Laurence Olivier Awards and ran for eight years. The same production was revived on Broadway in 1986 for a three-year run. The production won three of 11 Tony Award nominations.

== Production history ==
Me and My Girl originally opened in London's West End at the Victoria Palace Theatre on 16 December 1937 and starred Lupino Lane. Lane had previously played Bill Snibson in a horseracing comedy play, Twenty to One, that opened in 1935. Me and My Girl was conceived as a fresh vehicle for the character. At first attracting little notice, the production gained success after a matinee performance was broadcast live on BBC radio following the cancellation of a sporting event. In May 1939, a performance was televised live from the theatre, one of the first such broadcasts; it was rebroadcast that July. The original West End production ran for 1,646 performances.

The musical was revived in 1941, 1945 and 1949 in the West End. Lupino Lane starred and directed each production, with choreography by Fred Leslie. In the 1980s, the book was revised by Stephen Fry and Mike Ockrent. This version included the song "Leaning on a Lamp-post".

In 1984, another revised production opened at the Leicester Haymarket Theatre with a revised script by Fry and contributions by director Mike Ockrent. It transferred to the Adelphi Theatre on 12 February 1985 and closed on 16 January 1993 after an eight-year run and 3,303 performances. It starred Robert Lindsay as Bill Snibson, Emma Thompson as Sally Smith, and Frank Thornton as Sir John. The production won two Olivier Awards: Musical of the Year and Outstanding Performance by an Actor in a Musical (Robert Lindsay). Cast changes included Gary Wilmot, Les Dennis, Enn Reitel and Karl Howman as Bill, and Bonnie Langford, Su Pollard, Louise English, Jessica Martin and Lorraine Chase as Sally. Thornton was succeeded by Nicholas Smith and Patrick Cargill. The production subsequently toured throughout Britain.

The same production opened on Broadway in New York City at the Marquis Theatre on 10 August 1986 and closed on 31 December 1989, after 1,420 performances. The production was directed by Ockrent with choreography by Gillian Gregory. The cast starred Robert Lindsay as Bill and Maryann Plunkett as Sally, with George S. Irving and Jane Connell. The production was nominated for 13 Tony Awards in 11 categories and won for Best Actor, Best Actress and Best Choreography. Jim Dale was a replacement as Bill, and Ellen Foley was later Sally. Lady Jacqueline Carstone was originated by Jane Summerhays, with Dee Hoty and Janet Aldrich as replacements. Jay Garner was a replacement as Sir John Tremayne. Stanley Lebowsky and later Tom Helm served as music director, with Sue Anderson as assistant conductor; her conducting positions on Broadway marked a breaking of the glass ceiling. Tim Curry played Bill for one year in the US tour that began in October 1987.

Numerous productions have been staged over the years across the UK. In 1997, for example, it was staged at the Royal Shakespeare Theatre for a limited run. A 70th anniversary production had an eight-month British tour during 2006, and the show also played at Sheffield Theatres in 2010.

The Shaw Festival in Niagara-on-the-Lake, Ontario, Canada, staged a production directed by Ashlie Corcoran and featuring Michael Therriault as Bill and Kristi Frank as Sally, which ran from April through October 2017. An Encores! staged concert in May 2018 starred Christian Borle and Laura Michelle Kelly as Bill and Sally. Warren Carlyle directed and choreographed. The musical was revived at Chichester Festival Theatre from July to August 2018, directed by Daniel Evans and starring Matt Lucas as Bill and Caroline Quentin as the Duchess of Deane.

== Plot ==
Setting: London, in and around Hareford Hall, Hampshire; Mayfair and Lambeth in the later 1930s.

Act I

The Harefords, a family of haughty aristocrats, are seeking the legitimate heir to the title of Earl of Hareford. Bill Snibson, a Cockney from Lambeth, is found and named as that heir. The 13th Earl had secretly and briefly wed a girl from a bad neighbourhood, and Bill is the couple's son. His rough behaviour does not satisfy the very proper executors of the 13th Earl's estate (Maria, Duchess of Dene, and Sir John Tremayne). Under the terms of the Earl's will, he must learn gentlemanly manners to their satisfaction to inherit the title and estate. The Duchess thinks that she can make Bill "fit and proper", but not his Cockney girlfriend, Sally Smith. The Duchess plans a party in Bill's honour, but Sally is not to be invited. Sir John tells Sally that she and Bill ought to return to Lambeth, but he is moved by Sally's heartfelt declaration of love for Bill ("Once You Lose Your Heart").

At the party, Bill puts on airs and tries to please his new-found upper-class lawyers, family and servants, but his everyman roots quickly begin to show. Sally shows up in inappropriate garb, with her Lambeth friends, saying that she is going back to where she belongs. Bill seconds this at first, but then teaches the nobility "The Lambeth Walk".

Act II

Bill must make a speech in the House of Lords in coronet and "vermin"-trimmed peer's robes. Sally leaves, telling him to marry someone with good blood, and, in a scene inspired by Gilbert and Sullivan's Ruddigore, the portraits of Bill's ancestors awaken to remind him of his noblesse oblige. Bill and Sally have gained an ally in Sir John, who offers to help them by engaging a speech professor (implied to be Henry Higgins from Pygmalion) to help Sally impress the Duchess.

Bill constantly bemoans his separation from Sally. Preparing another party for Bill, the Duchess realises how much Sally means to him. This puts her in a romantic mood, and she accepts an offer of marriage from Sir John. Bill, dressed in his old outrageous Cockney clothes, declares that he is going home and goes upstairs to pack. Just then, Sally astonishes everyone by arriving in an elegant gown and tiara and speaking with a perfect upper-crust accent. When Bill returns downstairs, Sally conceals her identity; once she reveals it, Bill is relieved and the couple gain the acceptance of the family.

== Musical numbers ==
Based on the 1986 Broadway production

Act 1

- A Weekend at Hareford – Ensemble
- Thinking of No-One But Me – Lady Jaqueline Carstone and The Hon. Gerald Bolingbroke
- The Family Solicitor – Herbert Parchester and The Family
- Me and My Girl – Bill Snibson and Sally Smith
- An English Gentleman – Charles Hethersett and Staff
- You Would If You Could – Lady Jaqueline and Bill
- Hold My Hand – Bill, Sally and Dancers
- Once You Lose Your Heart – Sally
- Preparation Fugue – The Company
- The Lambeth Walk – Bill, Sally and The Company

Act 2

- The Sun Has Got His Hat On* – The Hon. Gerald Bolingbroke, Lady Jaqueline and Ensemble (*not written for this musical; dates from 1932)
- Take It on the Chin – Sally
- Once You Lose Your Heart (Reprise) – Sally
- Song of Hareford – Duchess Maria, Bill and Ensemble
- Love Makes the World Go Round – Bill and Sir John Tremayne
- Leaning on a Lamp-post* – Bill and Ensemble (*not written for this musical; dates from 1937)
- If Only You Had Cared for Me – Sir John and Duchess Maria
- Finale – The Company

== Characters ==
- Bill Snibson – a cockney costermonger who inherits Lord Hareford's land and titles
- Sally Smith – Bill's sweetheart
- Maria, Duchess of Dene – an intimidating aristocrat, Bill's aunt
- Sir John Tremayne – an older gentleman, who is kind to Sally and Bill, and in love with the Duchess
- Lady Jacqueline (Jaquie) Carstone – a vamp who pursues Bill
- The Hon Gerald Bolingbroke – a foppish young man in love with Jacquie
- Herbert Parchester – the family solicitor
- Sir Jasper Tring – an elderly and hard-of-hearing nobleman
- Charles, the Butler – a manservant
- Lord and Lady Battersby — other members of the family
- Mrs Brown – Sally's landlady
- Bob Barking – a friend of Bill and Sally
- Aristocrats, servants and Cockneys

== Film adaptation ==
In 1939, the play was turned into a film directed by Albert de Courville. Lane reprised his stage role of Snibson. The film took its name from the well-known song and dance. The film was a largely faithful adaptation of the musical and was commercially successful and popular with critics.

== Awards and nominations ==
=== London revival 1984 ===
Year	Award	Category	Nominee	Result
1985	Laurence Olivier Award	Musical of the Year		Won
1985	Laurence Olivier Award	Best Actor in a Musical	Robert Lindsay	Won

=== Original Broadway production ===
Year	Award	Category	Nominee	Result
1987	Tony Award	Best Musical		Nominated
1987	Tony Award	Best Book of a Musical	L. Arthur Rose, Douglas Furber, Stephen Fry (revised book), and Mike Ockrent (contributions to revised book)	Nominated
1987	Tony Award	Best Original Score	Noel Gay, Douglas Furber and L. Arthur Rose	Nominated
1987	Tony Award	Best Performance by a Leading Actor in a Musical	Robert Lindsay	Won
1987	Tony Award	Best Performance by a Leading Actress in a Musical	Maryann Plunkett	Won
1987	Tony Award	Best Performance by a Featured Actor in a Musical	George S. Irving	Nominated
1987	Tony Award	Best Performance by a Featured Actor in a Musical	Timothy Jerome	Nominated
1987	Tony Award	Best Performance by a Featured Actress in a Musical	Jane Connell	Nominated
1987	Tony Award	Best Performance by a Featured Actress in a Musical	Jane Summerhays	Nominated
1987	Tony Award	Best Direction of a Musical	Mike Ockrent	Nominated
1987	Tony Award	Best Choreography	Gillian Gregory	Won
1987	Tony Award	Best Scenic Design	Martin Johns	Nominated
1987	Tony Award	Best Costume Design	Ann Curtis	Nominated
1987	Drama Desk Award	Outstanding Musical		Nominated
1987	Drama Desk Award	Outstanding Book of a Musical	Douglas Furber and L. Arthur Rose	Won
1987	Drama Desk Award	Outstanding Actor in a Musical	Robert Lindsay	Won
1987	Drama Desk Award	Outstanding Actress in a Musical	Maryann Plunkett	Nominated
1987	Drama Desk Award	Outstanding Featured Actor in a Musical	Timothy Jerome	Nominated
1987	Drama Desk Award	Outstanding Featured Actress in a Musical	Jane Summerhays	Won
1987	Drama Desk Award	Outstanding Director of a Musical	Mike Ockrent	Won
1987	Drama Desk Award	Outstanding Orchestrations	Chris Walker	Nominated
1987	Drama Desk Award	Outstanding Music	Noel Gay	Won
1987	Drama Desk Award	Outstanding Set Design	Martin Johns	Nominated
1987	Drama Desk Award	Outstanding Costume Design	Ann Curtis	Nominated
1987	Theatre World Award		Robert Lindsay	Won
1987	New York Drama Critics' Circle Award	Best Musical	Noel Gay, Douglas Furber and L. Arthur Rose	Runner-up
