= Anniversary Anthems =

Studio album by Toy Dolls
- Released: 2000
- Recorded: November 1999 – February 2000 at Trinity Heights, Newcastle Upon Tyne, England.
- Genre: Punk rock
- Length: 36:51
- Label: Receiver Records
- Producer: Michael Algar

Toy Dolls chronology
On Stage in Stuttgart (1999)	Anniversary Anthems (2000)	Our Last Album? (2004)

Professional ratings
Review scores
Source	Rating
Allmusic	2.5/5 stars

Anniversary Anthems is a studio album by the English punk rock band Toy Dolls, recorded in 2000.

== Track listing ==
All compositions by Michael Algar except where noted.

1. "The Anniversary Waltz" (Dubin, Franklin) – 1:13
2. "My Baby Is a Battleaxe" – 2:43
3. "Her with a Hoover" – 2:29
4. "Alec's Back" – 2:32
5. "Dorkamania" – 2:26
6. "Audreys Alone At Last" – 2:39
7. "Eine Kleine Nacht Muzik" – 3:05
8. "Charlies Watching" – 3:18
9. "I Wish My Eyes Were Ernies" – 2:37
10. "Livin' on Newton Hall" – 2:51
11. "What She Had with Huey" – 2:57
12. "I've Had Enough O'magaluf" – 3:07
13. "Livin la Vida Loca (Ricky Martin cover)" (Rosa, Child) – 3:24
14. "The Anniversary Waltz" (Dubin, Franklin) – 1:12
15. "We're 21 Today" – 0:18

== Personnel ==
- Michael "Olga" Algar - vocals, guitar
- Gary "Gary Fun" Dunn - bass, vocals
- Martin "Marty" Yule - drums, vocals
