= Herts/Middlesex 4 =

English rugby league

- Sport: Rugby Union
- Instituted: 1996; 30 years ago
- Ceased: 2010; 16 years ago
- Number of teams: 6
- Country: England
- Holders: Harrow (1st title) (2009–10) (promoted to Herts/Middlesex 3)
- Most titles: Hatfield (2 titles)
- Website: clubs.rfu.com

Herts/Middlesex 4 was a tier 12 English Rugby Union league that was organized by the London and South East Division Rugby Football Union. It was the fourth division competition for clubs in Hertfordshire and parts of north-west London that traditionally belonged to the historic county of Middlesex. Promoted teams moved up to Herts/Middlesex 3 and since the cancellation of Herts/Middlesex 5 there was no relegation.

It involved a number of formats over the years, switching between a single division and regional (north/south) divisions. Herts/Middlesex 4 folded at the end of the 2009-10 season with most teams being promoted automatically to Herts/Middlesex 3.

== Participating Clubs 2009-10 ==
- British Airways
- Chess Valley
- GWR
- Harrow
- Hayes
- Northolt
- Southgate
- Sudbury & London Springboks

== Original teams ==
When this division began in 1996 it contained the following teams:

- Feltham - transferred from Middlesex 2 (8th)
- Hammersmith & Fulham - transferred from Middlesex 2 (9th)
- Hayes - transferred from Middlesex 2 (13th)
- London Cornish - transferred from Middlesex 3 (runners up)
- Old Ashmoleans - transferred from Hertfordshire 1 (8th)
- Old Grammarians transferred from Middlesex 3 (4th)
- Old Isleworthians - transferred from Middlesex 2 (10th)
- Old Standfordians - transferred from Hertfordshire 1 (6th)
- Pinner & Grammarians - transferred from Middlesex 2 (12th)
- Royal Hospitals (Note: Would later become known as St Barts and The Royal London RFC.) - promoted from Middlesex 4 (champions)
- Royston - transferred from Hertfordshire 1 (7th)
- Southgate - transferred from Middlesex 3 (3rd)

== Herts/Middlesex 4 honours ==
Herts/Middlesex 4
| Season | No of Teams | Champions | Runners–up | Relegated Teams | League Name |
| 1996–97 | 12 | Feltham (Note: League restructuring caused by the cancellation of Herts/Middlesex 5 meant that champions Feltham were promoted two levels up to Herts/Middlesex 2.) | London Cornish (Note: The league restructuring caused by the cancellation of Herts/Middlesex 5 saw runners up London Cornish promoted/transferred into Surrey 3, while seven clubs ranked 3rd to 10th were promoted up into Herts/Middlesex 3, including Old Ashmoleans, Royston, Hammersmith & Fulham, Southgate, Old Isleworthians, Old Grammarians and Pinner & Grammarians. 9th placed Old Standfordians would drop out of the league.) | No relegation (Note: The cancellation of Herts/Middlesex 5 meant that there was no relegation, although restructuring of Herts/Middlesex 4 into two regional divisions would see 11th placed Hayes moved into Herts/Middlesex 4 South, while bottom club Royal Hospitals would drop out of the leagues.) | Herts/Middlesex 4 |
| 1997–98 | 8 | Old Tottonians | Old Streetonians | No relegation | Herts/Middlesex 4 North |
| 1997–98 | 8 | Quintin | British Airways | No relegation | Herts/Middlesex 4 South |
| 1998–99 | 7 | Chess Valley | Cuffley | No relegation | Herts/Middlesex 4 North |
| 1998–99 | 6 | London Tribes | Pinner & Grammarians | No relegation | Herts/Middlesex 4 South |
| 1999–00 | 6 | Kilburn Cosmos | Belsize Park | No relegation | Herts/Middlesex 4 North |
| 1999–00 | 6 | GWR | Orleans F.P. | No relegation | Herts/Middlesex 4 South |
| 2000–01 | 7 | Hatfield | Q.E.II Hospital | No relegation | Herts/Middlesex 4 North |
| 2000–01 | 6 | Osterley | Belsize Park | No relegation | Herts/Middlesex 4 South |
| 2001–02 | 6 | Old Streetonians | Royston | No relegation | Herts/Middlesex 4 North |
| 2001–02 | 7 | Sudbury & London Springboks | London Tribes | No relegation | Herts/Middlesex 4 South |
| 2002–03 | 7 | Southgate | Wealdstone | No relegation | Herts/Middlesex 4 North |
| 2002–03 | 6 | Ickenham | Quintin | No relegation | Herts/Middlesex 4 South |
| 2003–04 | 6 | Old Ashmoleans | Hackney (Note: Due to Herts/Middlesex 4 North being abolished the following season all teams were promoted to Herts/Middlesex 3 North bar Northolt who dropped out of the league.) | No relegation | Herts/Middlesex 4 North |
| 2003–04 | 5 | British Airways | GWR (Note: Due to Herts/Middlesex 4 South being abolished the following season all teams were promoted to Herts/Middlesex 3 South bar Osterley who dropped out of the league.) | No relegation | Herts/Middlesex 4 South |
| 2005–07 | No competition | | | | |
| 2008–09 | 8 | Hatfield | Pinner & Grammarians | No relegation | Herts/Middlesex 4 |
| 2009–10 | 6 | Harrow | Chess Valley (Note: As it was the last season of Herts/Middlesex 4 all teams in the division would be automatically promoted to Herts/Middlesex 3 except GWR who would join the Middlesex Merit League.) | No relegation | Herts/Middlesex 4 |
Green backgrounds are promotion places.

== Number of league titles ==
- Hatfield (2) (Note: One of Hatfield's titles was for Herts/Middlesex 4 North.)
- British Airways (1) (Note: British Airways title was for Herts/Middlesex 4 South.)
- Chess Valley (1) (Note: Chess Valley's title was for Herts/Middlesex 4 North.)
- Feltham (1)
- GWR (1) (Note: GWR's title was for Herts/Middlesex 4 South.)
- Harrow (1)
- Ickenham (1) (Note: Ickenham's title was for Herts/Middlesex 4 South.)
- Kilburn Cosmos (1) (Note: Kilburn Cosmos title was for Herts/Middlesex 4 North.)
- London Tribes (1) (Note: London Tribes title was for Herts/Middlesex 4 South.)
- Old Ashmoleans (1) (Note: Old Ashmoleans title was for Herts/Middlesex 4 North.)
- Old Streetonians (1) (Note: Old Streetonians title was for Herts/Middlesex 4 North.)
- Old Tottonians (1) (Note: Old Tottonians title was for Herts/Middlesex 4 North.)
- Osterley (1) (Note: Osterley's title was for Herts/Middlesex 4 South.)
- Quintin (1) (Note: Quintin's title was for Herts/Middlesex 4 South.)
- Southgate (1) (Note: Southgate's title was for Herts/Middlesex 4 North.)
- Sudbury & London Springboks (1) (Note: Sudbury & London Springboks title was for Herts/Middlesex 4 South.)

== See also ==
- London & SE Division RFU
- Hertfordshire RFU
- Middlesex RFU
- English rugby union system
- Rugby union in England
