= Middlesex 3 =

English rugby union league

- Sport: Rugby union
- Instituted: 1987; 39 years ago
- Ceased: 1996; 30 years ago
- Number of teams: 10
- Country: England
- Holders: UCS Old Boys (1st title) (1995–96) (promoted to Herts/Middlesex 3)
- Most titles: Bank of England (2 titles)

Middlesex 3 was an English level 12 Rugby Union league with teams from north-west London taking part. Promoted teams moved up to Middlesex 2 and relegation was to Middlesex 4. The division was cancelled at the end of the 1995–96 campaign after nine seasons due to the merger of the Hertfordshire and Middlesex regional leagues.

== Original teams ==
When league rugby began in 1987 this division was split into two regional leagues containing the following teams:

North

- Belsize Park
- Enfield Old Grammarians (Note: Would merge with Old Ignatians RFC in 1988 to become Enfield Old Ignatians RFC.)
- Haringey Rhinos
- Kodak
- Old Grammarians
- Old Ignatians (Note: Would merge with Enfield Old Grammarians RFC in 1988 to become Enfield Old Ignatians RFC.)
- Old Tottonians
- Roxeth Manor Old Boys
- S.T. and C.
- UCS Old Boys
- Wembley

South

- Actonians
- Bank of England
- CAV (Note: Would be renamed as Northolt RFC in 1988.)
- Feltham
- Hammersmith & Fulham
- Hayes
- London French
- Meadhurst
- Old Isleworthians
- Quintin

== Middlesex 3 honours ==
=== Middlesex 3 North/South (1987–1988) ===
The original Middlesex 3 was a tier 10 league, split into two regional divisions (north and south). Promotion was up to Middlesex 2 and there was no relegation.

Middlesex 3: North / South
Season	No of Teams	Champions	Runners–up	Relegated Teams	League Name
1987–88	11	Haringey Rhinos	Wembley	Multiple teams (Note: The creation of Middlesex 4 and merging of Middlesex 3 into a single division, meant that six clubs were relegated, including Kodak, Enfield Old Grammarians, S.T. and C., Old Ignatians, UCS Old Boys and Roxeth Manor Old Boys.)	Middlesex 3 North
1987–88	10	Hammersmith & Fulham	CAV	Multiple teams (Note: The creation of Middlesex 4 and merging of Middlesex 3 into a single division, meant that six clubs were relegated, including Hayes, Meadhurst, Feltham, London French, Actonians and Bank of England.)	Middlesex 3 South
Green backgrounds are promotion places.

=== Middlesex 3 (1987–1992) ===
The creation of Middlesex 4 ahead of the 1988–89 season saw Middlesex 3 merged into a single division remaining at tier 10 of the league structure. Promotion continued to Middlesex 2, while relegation was to the new Middlesex 4.

Middlesex 3
Season	No of Teams	Champions	Runners–up	Relegated Teams
1988–89	11	Old Grammarians	Osterley	Belsize Park, Northolt, Pinner & Grammarians
1989–90	11	Bank of England	Hammersmith & Fulham	London Cornish, Meadhurst
1990–91	11	Old Isleworthians	Antlers	Barclays Bank
1991–92	11	Roxeth Manor Old Boys (Note: Champions Roxeth Manor Old Boys were promoted two levels up into Middlesex 1 due to restructuring as a result of the introduction of the new Herts/Middlesex division for the following season.)	Wembley (Note: Runners up Wembley were also promoted two levels up into Middlesex 1. Teams ranked 3rd to 11th were promoted into Middlesex 2 as part of the league restructuring.)	No relegation (Note: Due to restructuring of the Hertfordshire and Middlesex leagues there was no relegation this season.)
Green backgrounds are promotion places.

=== Middlesex 3 (1992–1996) ===
The creation of Herts/Middlesex at the beginning of the 1992–93 season meant that Middlesex 3 dropped to become a tier 11 league. The introduction of National 5 South for the 1993–94 season meant that Middlesex 3 dropped another level to become a tier 12 league for the years that National 5 South was active. Promotion and relegation continued to Middlesex 2 and Middlesex 4 respectively. The merging of the Hertfordshire and Middlesex regional divisions at the end of the 1995–96 season meant that Middlesex 3 was cancelled.

Middlesex 3
Season	No of Teams	Champions	Runners–up	Relegated Teams
1992–93	10	Pinner & Grammarians	Hayes	Meadhurst, London French
1993–94	10	Bank of England	London Nigerian	Quintin, Royal Free Hospital, St. Bart's Hospital
1994–95	10	London Exiles	London French	Osterley
1995–96	10	UCS Old Boys	London Cornish	No relegation
Green backgrounds are promotion places.

== Number of league titles ==
- Bank of England (2)
- Hammersmith & Fulham (1) (Note: Hammersmith & Fulham's title was Middlesex 3 South.)
- Haringey Rhinos (1) (Note: Haringey Rhinos title was Middlesex 3 North.)
- London Exiles (1)
- Old Grammarians (1)
- Old Isleworthians (1)
- Pinner & Grammarians (1)
- Roxeth Manor Old Boys (1)
- UCS Old Boys (1)

== See also ==
- London & SE Division RFU
- Middlesex RFU
- English rugby union system
- Rugby union in England
