= Herts/Middlesex 2 =

Tier 10 English Rugby Union league

- Current season or competition: 2019–20 Herts/Middlesex 2
- Sport: Rugby union
- Instituted: 1996; 30 years ago
- Number of teams: 11
- Country: England
- Holders: Ealing Trailfinders 1871 (1st title) (2019-20) (promoted to Herts/Middlesex 1)
- Most titles: Bank Of England, Harlequin Amateurs, Harrow, Kilburn Cosmos, Old Actonians, Saracens Amateurs (2 titles)
- Website: englandrugby.com

Herts/Middlesex 2 is a tier 10 English Rugby Union league. It is organised by the London and South East Division Rugby Football Union and is the second division competition for clubs in Hertfordshire and parts of north-west London that traditionally was encompassed by the historic county of Middlesex. Each year some of the clubs in this division also take part in the RFU Junior Vase - a level 9-12 national competition.

Promoted teams move up to Herts/Middlesex 1 and there is currently no relegation (prior to 2013–14 teams had dropped into Herts/Middlesex 3). Over the course of its history, Herts/Middlesex 2 has veered between regional and single division formats.

== Participating Clubs 2021-22 ==
The teams competing in 2021-22 achieved their places in the league based on performances in 2019–20, the 'previous season' column in the table below refers to that season not 2020–21.

Pinner & Grammarians finished 11th in 2019-20 and whilst not relegated, did not return for 2021-22 and instead have dropped to Herts Merit 4SW.

Team	Ground	Capacity	City/Area	Previous season
Brunel University	Brunel University Sports Park		Uxbridge, London	New to leagues
Chess Valley	Croxley Guild of Sports		Croxley, Hertfordshire	8th
Cuffley	Botany Bay Cricket Club		Botany Bay, London	7th
London French	Barn Elms		Barnes, London	9th
Mill Hill	Champions Way		Mill Hill, London	Relegated from Herts/Middlesex 1 (10th)
Old Millhillians	Mill Hill School		Mill Hill, London	3rd
Staines	The Reeves		Feltham, London	10th
UCS Old Boys	UCS Sports Ground		Cricklewood, London	New to league (withdrew from Herts/Middlesex 1 in 2019–20
Uxbridge	Uxbridge Sports Club		Uxbridge, London	4th
West London	London Marathon Playing Field		Greenford, London	5th
Watford	Radlett Road		Watford, Hertfordshire	6th

Locations of the 2021-22 Herts/Middlesex 2 teams in Greater London & Hertfordshire

== Season 2020–21 ==
On 30 October the RFU announced that a decision had been taken to cancel Adult Competitive Leagues (National League 1 and below) for the 2020/21 season meaning Herts/Middlesex 2 was not contested.

== Participating Clubs 2019-20 ==
Team	Ground	Capacity	City/Area	Previous season
Chess Valley	Croxley Guild of Sports		Croxley, Hertfordshire	New to leagues
Cuffley	Botany Bay Cricket Club		Botany Bay, London	6th
Ealing Trailfinders 1871	Trailfinders Sports Ground	4,000	West Ealing, London	New to leagues
London French	Barn Elms	500	Barnes, London	8th
Old Actonians	Old Actonians Sports Ground		Acton, London	Relegated from Herts/Middlesex 1 (11th)
Old Millhillians	Mill Hill School		Mill Hill, London	5th
Pinner & Grammarians	Shaftesbury Playing Fields		Pinner, Harrow, London	9th
Staines	The Reeves		Feltham, London	Relegated from Herts/Middlesex 1 (12th)
Uxbridge	Uxbridge Sports Club		Uxbridge, London	4th
West London	London Marathon Playing Field		Greenford, London	7th
Watford	Radlett Road		Watford, Hertfordshire	3rd

Locations of the 2019-20 Herts/Middlesex 2 teams in Greater London & Herts

== Participating Clubs 2018-19 ==
Team	Ground	Capacity	City/Area	Previous season
Cuffley	Botany Bay Cricket Club		Botany Bay, London	5th
Haringey Rhinos	New River Stadium	5,000	West Green, London	9th
London French	Barn Elms	500	Barnes, London	Relegated from Herts/Middlesex 1 (12th)
London Scottish Lions	King's House Sports Ground		Chiswick, London	Switched from Zoo Sports Shield
Mill Hill	Champions Way		Mill Hill, London	3rd
Old Millhillians	Mill Hill School		Mill Hill, London	4th
Pinner & Grammarians	Shaftesbury Playing Fields		Pinner, Harrow, London	Promoted from Middlesex Merit Tables 2
Uxbridge	Uxbridge Sports Club		Uxbridge, London	6th
West London	London Marathon Playing Field		Greenford, London	7th
Watford	Radlett Road		Watford, Hertfordshire	Relegated from Herts/Middlesex 1 (11th)

Locations of the 2018-19 Herts/Middlesex 2 teams in Greater London & Herts

== Participating Clubs 2017-18 ==
Team	Ground	Capacity	City/Area	Previous season
Cuffley	Botany Bay Cricket Club		Botany Bay, Enfield, London	9th (3rd in Shield)
Finsbury Park	Downhills Park		West Green, Haringey, London	Promoted from Herts/Middlesex Merit Table 3
Haringey Rhinos	New River Stadium	5,000	West Green, Haringey, London	5th
Harlequin Amateurs	St. Mary's University College		Twickenham, Richmond upon Thames, London	8th (2nd in Shield)
Mill Hill	Champions Way		Mill Hill, Barnet, London	7th (1st in Shield)
Old Millhillians	Mill Hill School		Mill Hill, Barnet, London	3rd
Thamesians	Twickenham Green		Twickenham, Richmond upon Thames, London	4th
Uxbridge	Uxbridge Sports Club		Uxbridge, Hillingdon, London	11th (5th in Shield)
West London	London Marathon Playing Field		Greenford, Ealing, London	6th

Locations of the 2017-18 Herts/Middlesex 2 teams in Greater London

== Participating Clubs 2016-17 ==
- Bank of England (relegated from Herts/Middlesex 1)
- Chess Valley
- Cuffley
- Haringey Rhinos
- Harlequin Amateurs
- Mill Hill
- Old Isleworthians
- Old Milhallians (relegated from Herts/Middlesex 1)
- Thamesians
- Uxbridge
- Watford
- West London

== Participating Clubs 2015-16 ==
- Chess Valley
- Feltham (relegated from Herts/Middlesex 1)
- Haringey Rhinos (relegated from Herts/Middlesex 1)
- Harlequin Amateurs
- Hendon
- Ickenham
- Mill Hill
- Old Isleworthians
- Saracens Amateurs
- Thamesians
- Uxbridge
- Watford
- West London

== Participating Clubs 2014-15 ==
- Chess Valley
- Harlequin Amateurs
- Hendon
- Hillingdon Abbots
- Ickenham
- London French
- Mill Hill
- Old Isleworthains
- Quintin
- Saracens Amateurs
- Thamesians
- Uxbridge
- Watford
- West London

== Participating Clubs 2013-14 ==
- Chess Valley
- Feltham
- Hillingdon Abbots
- Hendon
- Ickenham
- London Welsh Amateurs
- Quintin
- Saracens Amateurs
- Thamesians
- Uxbridge

== Participating Clubs 2012-13 ==
- Chess Valley
- Hillingdon Abbots
- Ickenham
- Kilburn Cosmos
- Old Grammarians
- Old Isleworthians
- Pinner & Grammarians
- Quintin
- Royston
- Saracens Amateurs
- Uxbridge

== Participating Clubs 2009-10 ==
- Belsize Park
- Ickenham
- London French
- Old Isleworthians
- Old Merchant Taylors'
- Old Millhillians
- Old Tottonians
- Pinner and Grammarians
- Royston
- Quintin
- Uxbridge

== Original teams ==
When this division began in 1996 it contained the following teams:

- Actonians - transferred from Middlesex 1 (10th)
- CS Stags 1863 - transferred from Middlesex 1 (3rd)
- Datchworth - transferred from Hertfordshire 1 (3rd)
- Enfield Ignatians - promoted from Middlesex 2 (champions)
- Harrow - transferred from Middlesex 1 (4th)
- H.A.C. - transferred from Middlesex 1 (6th)
- London New Zealand - relegated from Herts/Middlesex (13th)
- Old Haberdashers - transferred from Middlesex 1 (5th)
- Old Paulines - transferred from Middlesex 1 (7th)
- Stevenage Town - transferred from Hertfordshire 1 (2nd)
- Twickenham - transferred from Middlesex 1 (9th)
- Upper Clapton (Note: Upper Clapton are currently known as Epping Upper Clapton RFC.) - relegated from Herts/Middlesex (12th)
- Wembley - transferred from Middlesex 1 (8th)

== Herts/Middlesex 2 Honours ==
Herts/Middlesex 2 Honours
Season	No of Teams	Champions	Runners–up	Relegated Teams	League Name
1996–97	13	Harrow	Upper Clapton (Note: Due to league restructuring eleven teams would be promoted, including Twickenham, Wembley, Old Paulines, H.A.C., London New Zealand, Enfield Ignatians, CS Stags 1863, Old Haberdashers and Stevenage Town. All teams would go into Herts/Middlesex 1, apart from Old Paulines who would join Surrey 1.)	No relegation (Note: League restructuring meant that there was no relegation.)	Herts/Middlesex 2
1997–98	13	UCS Old Boys	Feltham	London Exiles, Sudbury Court, (Note: Relegated Sudbury Court would drop out of the leagues.) Watford	Herts/Middlesex 2
1998–99	12	Bank Of England	Hitchin	No relegation	Herts/Middlesex 2
1999–00	13	Northolt	Hendon	Multiple teams (Note: Relegated teams included Quintin, Hillingdon Abbots, Southgate, Roxeth Manor O.B., Hammersmith & Fulham, Old Tottonians, Ickenham, Old Actonians, London French and Wealdstone. The large number of relegated teams was due to league restructuring for the following season meant that the division would decrease from 13 to 9 teams.)	Herts/Middlesex 2
2000–01	9	CS Rugby 1863	U.C.S. Old Boys	Hendon, Old Haberdashers, Northolt	Herts/Middlesex 2
2001–02	9	Haringey Rhinos	Hitchin	Old Grammarians, Kilburn Cosmos	Herts/Middlesex 2
2002–03	10	Hammersmith & Fulham	Datchworth	Old Isleworthians	Herts/Middlesex 2
2003–04	9	Old Actonians	Chess Valley	No relegation (Note: No relegation due to Herts/Middlesex league restructure for the following season.)	Herts/Middlesex 2
2004–05	9	Mill Hill	Wealdstone	Southgate, Cuffley	Herts/Middlesex 2 North
2004–05	9	Harlequin Amateurs	Hillingdon Abbots	Quintin, Old Isleworthians	Herts/Middlesex 2 South
2005–06	8	Hemel Hempstead	Old Ashmoleans	Royston	Herts/Middlesex 2 North
2005–06	9	Old Actonians	Uxbridge	GWR, London French	Herts/Middlesex 2 South
2006–07	9	Saracens Amateurs	Old Millhillians	Chess Valley	Herts/Middlesex 2 North
2006–07	8	Kilburn Cosmos	Belsize Park	British Airways	Herts/Middlesex 2 South
2007–08	9	Old Streetonians	Cheshunt	Watford, Old Tottonians	Herts/Middlesex 2 North
2007–08	8	Harlequin Amateurs	H.A.C.	Ickenham, Old Isleworthians	Herts/Middlesex 2 South
2008–09	9	Hendon	Old Grammarians	No relegation (Note: No relegation as division increased from 9 to 10 teams for the next season.)	Herts/Middlesex 2
2009–10	10	H.A.C.	Old Priorians	Mill Hill	Herts/Middlesex 2
2010–11	11	Old Millhillians	Belsize Park	Old Tottonians, Quintin	Herts/Middlesex 2
2011–12	11	Harrow	Old Merchant Taylors'	London French	Herts/Middlesex 2
2012–13	11	Kilburn Cosmos	Royston	Old Grammarians, Old Isleworthians, Pinner & Grammarians	Herts/Middlesex 2
2013–14	11	Feltham	London Welsh Amateurs	No relegation (Note: No relegation as Herts/Middlesex 3 abolished starting from the next season.)	Herts/Middlesex 2
2014–15	14 (Note: Due to cancellation of Herts/Middlesex 3 the division would increase to 14 teams with extra teams coming up from the cancelled league.)	Hillingdon Abbots	London French	No relegation	Herts/Middlesex 2
2015–16	12	Saracens Amateurs	Hendon	No relegation	Herts/Middlesex 2
2016–17	12	Bank Of England	Watford	No relegation	Herts/Middlesex 2
2017–18	9	Finsbury Park	Thamesians	No relegation	Herts/Middlesex 2
2018–19	10	London Scottish Lions	Mill Hill	No relegation	Herts/Middlesex 2
2019–20	11 (Note: Although the league increased from 10 to 11 teams - Haringey Rhinos dropped out of the RFU leagues to play in the Middlesex 3 Merit League for the 2019–20 season.)	Ealing Trailfinders 1871	Old Actonians	No relegation	Herts/Middlesex 2
2020–21	11			No relegation	Herts/Middlesex 2
Green backgrounds are promotion places.

== Promotion play-offs ==
Between 2004 and 2008 there was a play-off between the runners-up of Herts/Middlesex 2 North and Herts/Middlesex 2 South for the third and final promotion place to Herts/Middlesex 1. The team with the superior league record has home advantage in the tie.

The playoffs were ended before the 2008–09 season when the two regional divisions re-merged into a single division called Herts/Middlesex 2. At the end of the 2007–08 season the Herts/Middlesex 2 North teams had been the most successful with three wins to the Herts/Middlesex 2 South teams one; and the home team has won promotion on all four occasions.

Herts/Middlesex 2 North v Herts/Middlesex 2 South promotion play-off results
Season	Home team	Score	Away team	Venue	Attendance
2004–05	Hillingdon Abbots (S)	30-20	Wealdstone (N)	Pole Hill Open Spaces, Hayes, Greater London	
2005–06	Old Ashmoleans (N)	35-17	Uxbridge (S)	Bourneside Sports Ground, Southgate, Greater London	
2006–07	Old Millhillians (N)	15-10	Belsize Park (S)	Headstone Lane, Harrow, Greater London	
2007–08	Cheshunt (N)	17-10	H.A.C. (S)	Rosedale Sports Club, Cheshunt, Hertfordshire	
Green background is the promoted team. N = Herts/Middlesex 2 North and S = Herts/Middlesex 2 South

== Number of league titles ==
- Bank Of England (2)
- Harlequin Amateurs (2)
- Harrow (2)
- Kilburn Cosmos (2)
- Old Actonians (2)
- Saracens Amateurs (2)
- Civil Service (1)
- Ealing Trailfinders 1871 (1)
- Feltham (1)
- Finsbury Park (1)
- H.A.C. (1)
- Hammersmith & Fulham (1)
- Haringey Rhinos (1)
- Hemel Hempstead (1)
- Hendon (1)
- Hillingdon Abbots (1)
- Mill Hill (1)
- Northolt (1)
- Old Millhillians (1)
- Old Streetonians (1)
- UCS Old Boys (1)

== See also ==
- London & SE Division RFU
- Hertfordshire RFU
- Middlesex RFU
- English rugby union system
- Rugby union in England
