= Herts/Middlesex 5 =

English rugby union league

- Sport: Rugby union
- Instituted: 1996; 30 years ago
- Ceased: 1997; 29 years ago
- Number of teams: 15
- Country: England
- Holders: Millfield Old Boys (north) (1st title); Northolt (south) (1st title) (1996–97) (both promoted to Middlesex 4)
- Most titles: Millfield Old Boys, Northolt (1 title)

Herts/Middlesex 5 was a tier 13 English Rugby Union league that was organized by the London and South East Division Rugby Football Union. It was the fifth division competition for clubs in Hertfordshire and parts of north-west London that traditionally belonged to the historic county of Middlesex. The league was split into two regional divisions - Herts/Middlesex 5 North and Herts/Middlesex 5 - with promoted teams moving up to Herts/Middlesex 4 and there was no relegation as it was the lowest level in the region. Herts/Middlesex 5 only lasted one season before being discontinued, with all teams being transferred into Herts/Middlesex 4.

== Original teams ==
When the division was created in 1996 it contained the following teams in two regional divisions:

Herts/Middlesex 5 North

- Cuffley - transferred from Hertfordshire 1 (9th)
- Hatfield (Note: Hatfield would later merge with QEII Hospital to form Hatfield Queen Elizabeth RFC.) - transferred from Hertfordshire 1 (11th)
- Millfield Old Boys - N/A
- Old Streetonians - N/A
- Old Tottonians - transferred from Middlesex 3 (6th)
- QEII Hospital (Note: QEII Hospital would later merge with Hatfield RFC to form Hatfield Queen Elizabeth RFC.) - transferred from Hertfordshire 1 (10th)
- St. Nicholas Old Boys - transferred from Middlesex 3 (5th)

Herts/Middlesex 5 South

- British Airways - transferred from Middlesex 3 (10th)
- GWR - transferred from Middlesex 4 (5th)
- Meadhurst - transferred from Middlesex 4 (4th)
- Middlesex Hospital (Note: Middlesex Hospital RFC would later become part of Royal Free, University College and Middlesex Medical Students RFC.) - transferred from Middlesex 4 (runners up)
- Northolt - transferred from Middlesex 3 (8th)
- Orleans FP - transferred from Middlesex 3 (9th)
- Osterley - transferred from Middlesex 4 (6th)
- Quintin - transferred from Middlesex 3 (8th)

== Herts/Middlesex 5 honours ==
Herts/Middlesex
Season	No of Teams	Champions	Runners–up	Relegated Teams	League Name
1996–97	7	Millfield Old Boys (Note: Restructuring caused by the cancellation of Herts/Middlesex 5 meant that champions Millfield Old Boys were promoted up two levels to Herts/Middlesex 3.)	St. Nicholas (Note: The cancellation of Herts/Middlesex 5 would see runners up St. Nicholas join Millfield Old Boys by being promoted two levels up to Herts/Middlesex 3, while the rest of the clubs in the division would be promoted into Herts/Middlesex 4 North.)	No relegation	Herts/Middlesex 5 North
1996–97	8	Northolt (Note: Restructuring caused by the cancellation of Herts/Middlesex 5 meant that champions Northolt were promoted up two levels to Herts/Middlesex 3.)	GWR (Note: Due to the cancellation of Herts/Middlesex 5, runners up GWR and six other clubs would promoted to Herts/Middlesex 4 South. Bottom side Middlesex Hospital would drop out of the leagues.)	No relegation	Herts/Middlesex 5 South
Green backgrounds are promotion places.

== Number of league titles ==
- Millfield Old Boys (Note: Millfield Old Boys title was for Herts/Middlesex 5 North.)
- Northolt (1) (Note: Northolt's title was for Herts/Middlesex 5 South.)

== See also ==
- London & SE Division RFU
- Hertfordshire RFU
- Middlesex RFU
- English rugby union system
- Rugby union in England
