= Counties 3 Hertfordshire =

Tier 7 English Rugby Union league

- Sport: Rugby union
- Instituted: 1992; 34 years ago (as Herts/Middlesex)
- Number of teams: 12
- Country: England

Counties 3 Hertfordshire (formerly Counties 3 Herts/Middlesex and before that Herts/Middlesex 1) is a tier 9 English rugby union league. It is organised by the London and South East Division Rugby Football Union for clubs in Hertfordshire and parts of north-west London that was traditionally encompassed by the historic county of Middlesex. Promotion is to Counties 2 Hertfordshire and relegation is to the Hertfordshire RFU merit leagues.

Historically the league was a level 8 league but following the Rugby Football Union's Adult Competition Review, from season 2022–23 it became a level 9 competition and adopted the name Counties 3 Herts/Middlesex, however ahead of the 2025–26 season a decision was taken to split out Hertfordshire RFU and Middlesex RFU clubs.

== Participating clubs 2026–27 ==
Departing were Hitchin II (champions), Old Grammarians (runners-up) and Harpenden II (3rd) all promoted to Counties 2 Hertfordshire.

Team	Ground	Capacity	City/Area	Previous season
Biggleswade II	Langford Road		Biggleswade, Bedfordshire	New entry
Bishop's Stortford III	Silver Leys	1,600	Bishop's Stortford, Hertfordshire	7th
Cheshunt II	Rosedale Sports Club		Cheshunt, Hertfordshire, Hertfordshire	5th
Cuffley	Botany Bay Cricket Club		Botany Bay, London	6th
Fullerians II	Coningsby Drive		Watford, Hertfordshire	8th
Hemel Hempstead II	Chaulden Lane		Hemel Hempstead, Hertfordshire	New entry
Hertford III	Highfields		Ware, Hertfordshire	New entry
Hitchin III	King George V Playing Fields		Hitchin, Hertfordshire	New entry
Stevenage	North Road		Stevenage, Hertfordshire	10th
Watford	Radlett Road		Watford, Hertfordshire	4th
Welwyn II	Hobbs Way		Welwyn Garden City, Hertfordshire	9th

Locations of the 2026–d27 Counties 3 Hertfordshire teams

== Participating clubs 2025–26 ==
This was the first season with the league containing only Hertfordshire RFU clubs.

Royston (champions) and Chess Valley (3rd) were promoted to Counties 2 Hertfordshire. Also leaving as part of the division of Herts and Middlesex clubs were Actonians (4th), Finsbury Park (5th) and Kilburn Cosmos (6th) all promoted to Counties 2 Middlesex. Thamesians (runners-up) moved on a level transfer to Counties 3 Surrey.

Chess Valley II were initially placed in the league but subsequently withdrew leaving eleven clubs to contest the remaining fixtures.

Hatfield started the season but did not complete it withdrawing in early 2026.

Team	Ground	Capacity	City/Area	Previous season
Bishop's Stortford III	Silver Leys	1,600	Bishop's Stortford, Hertfordshire	New entry
Cheshunt II	Rosedale Sports Club		Cheshunt, Hertfordshire, Hertfordshire	New entry
Cuffley	Botany Bay Cricket Club		Botany Bay, London	Re-entry
Fullerians II	Coningsby Drive		Watford, Hertfordshire	New entry
Harpenden II	Redbourn Lane		Harpenden, Hertfordshire	New entry
~~Hatfield~~	~~Briars Lane~~		~~Hatfield, Hertfordshire~~	~~New entry~~
Hitchin II	King George V Playing Fields		Hitchin, Hertfordshire	New entry
Old Grammarians	Green Dragon Lane		Winchmore Hill, London	New entry
Stevenage	North Road		Stevenage, Hertfordshire	8th
Watford	Radlett Road		Watford, Hertfordshire	7th
Welwyn II	Hobbs Way		Welwyn Garden City, Hertfordshire	New entry

Locations of the 2025-26 Counties 3 Hertfordshire teams

== Participating clubs 2024–25 ==
Departing were UCS Old Boys and Verulamians promoted to Counties 2 Herts/Middlesex. Three clubs did not return for the new campaign - Bank Lane (9th) disbanded in Summer 2024 and merged with London Cornish RFC, Berkhamsted (10th) joined Herts RFU Merit South 1 and Uxbridge (13th) dropped to Middlesex RFU Merit 2. Joining were Mill Hill who re-entered the RFU league system for the first time since 2021–22.

Hendon began their league campaign but withdrew in October to join the Middlesex RFU Merit leagues. Mill Hill, a re-entry, also subsequently withdrew leaving only eight clubs to contest the remaining fixtures.

Team	Ground	Capacity	City/Area	Previous season
Actonians	Old Actonians Sports Ground		Acton, London	7th
Chess Valley	Croxley Guild of Sports		Croxley, Hertfordshire	5th
Finsbury Park	Downhills Park		West Green, London	3rd
Kilburn Cosmos	Gladstone Park		Kilburn, London	11th
Royston	The Heath Sports Centre		Royston, Hertfordshire	4th
Stevenage	North Road		Stevenage, Hertfordshire	12th
Thamesians	Twickenham Green		Twickenham, London	6th
Watford	Radlett Road		Watford, Hertfordshire	8th

Locations of the 2024-25 Counties 3 Herts/Middlesex teams in Hertfordshire
Locations of the 2024–25 Counties 3 Herts/Middlesex teams in Greater London

== Participating clubs 2023–24 ==
Departing were Old Millhillians and Brunel University promoted to Counties 2 Herts/Middlesex.

Joining were Royston, relegated from Counties 2 Herts/Middlesex, together with Berkhamsted, Stevenage and Finsbury Park.

Team	Ground	Capacity	City/Area	Previous season
Actonians	Old Actonians Sports Ground		Acton, London	8th
Bank Lane	Bank of England Sports Centre		Roehampton, London	3rd
Berkhamsted	Lockhart Field		Berkhamsted, Hertfordshire	Joined from H&M Merit 2 (Runners-Up)
Chess Valley	Croxley Guild of Sports		Croxley, Hertfordshire	11th
Finsbury Park	Downhills Park		West Green, London	Joined from Middlesex Merit 2
Kilburn Cosmos	Gladstone Park		Kilburn, London	9th
Royston	The Heath Sports Centre		Royston, Hertfordshire	Relegated from Counties 2 Herts/Middlesex (11th)
Stevenage Town	North Road		Stevenage, Hertfordshire	Joined from H&M Merit 2 (4th)
Thamesians	Twickenham Green		Twickenham, London	6th
UCS Old Boys	UCS Sports Ground		Cricklewood, London	5th
Uxbridge	Uxbridge Sports Club		Uxbridge, London	10th
Verulamians	Cotlandswick		London Colney, Hertfordshire	4th
Watford	Radlett Road		Watford, Hertfordshire	7th

Locations of the 2023–24 Counties 3 Herts/Middlesex teams in Hertfordshire
Locations of the 2023-24 Counties 3 Herts/Middlesex teams in Greater London

== Participating clubs 2022–23 ==
This was the first season following the RFU Adult Competition Review with the league adopting its new name of Counties 3 Herts/Middlesex.

Returning were five of the ten teams from the previous season. Bank of England RFC changed their name to Bank Lane RFC during Summer 2022.

Departing were the top five from the previous season - London Scottish Lions, Barnet Elizabethans, Ealing Trailfinders 1871, Wasps FC and Saracens Amateurs - all promoted to Counties 2 Herts/Middlesex.

Joining were Old Millhillians, Brunel University, Watford, Uxbridge, Chess Valley and UCS Old Boys, all promoted.

Team	Ground	Capacity	City/Area	Previous season
Actonians	Old Actonians Sports Ground		Acton, London	10th
Bank Lane	Bank of England Sports Centre		Roehampton, London	7th
Brunel University	Brunel University Sports Park		Uxbridge, London	Promoted from Herts/Middlesex 2 (runners-up)
Chess Valley	Croxley Guild of Sports		Croxley, Hertfordshire	Promoted from Herts/Middlesex 2 (5th)
Kilburn Cosmos	Gladstone Park		Kilburn, London	6th
Old Millhillians	Mill Hill School		Mill Hill, London	Promoted from Herts/Middlesex 2 (champions)
Thamesians	Twickenham Green		Twickenham, London	8th
UCS Old Boys	UCS Sports Ground		Cricklewood, London	Promoted from Herts/Middlesex 2 (7th)
Uxbridge	Uxbridge Sports Club		Uxbridge, London	Promoted from Herts/Middlesex 2 (4th)
Verulamians	Cotlandswick		London Colney, Hertfordshire	9th
Watford	Radlett Road		Watford, Hertfordshire	Promoted from Herts/Middlesex 2 (3rd)

Locations of the 2022-23 Counties 3 Herts/Middlesex teams in Hertfordshire
Locations of the 2022–23 Counties 3 Herts/Middlesex teams in Greater London

== Participating clubs 2021–22 ==
The teams competing in 2021-22 achieved their places in the league based on performances in 2019–20, the 'previous season' column in the table below refers to that season not 2020–21.

Team	Ground	Capacity	City/Area	Previous season
Actonians	Old Actonians Sports Ground		Acton, London	Promoted from Herts/Middlesex 2 (runners-up)
Bank Of England	Bank of England Sports Centre		Roehampton, London	7th
Barnet Elizabethans	Byng Road		Chipping Barnet, London	3rd
Ealing Trailfinders 1871	Trailfinders Sports Ground	4,000	West Ealing, London	Promoted from Herts/Middlesex 2 (champions)
Kilburn Cosmos	Gladstone Park		Kilburn, London	Relegated from London 3 NW (11th) (Note: Despite finishing 12th in L3NW in season 2019-20 Harrow RFC were not relegated, instead Kilburn Cosmos dropped to Herts/Middlesex 1 for season 2021-22.)
London Scottish Lions	King's House Sports Ground		Chiswick, London	5th
Saracens Amateurs	Bramley Sports Ground		Cockfosters, London	6th
Thamesians	Twickenham Green		Twickenham, London	8th
Verulamians	Cotlandswick		London Colney, Hertfordshire	9th
Wasps FC	Twyford Avenue Sports Ground		Acton, London	4th

Locations of the 2021-22 Herts/Middlesex 1 teams in Hertfordshire
Locations of the 2021-22 Herts/Middlesex 1 teams in Greater London

== Season 2020–21 ==
On 30 October the RFU announced that a decision had been taken to cancel Adult Competitive Leagues (National League 1 and below) for the 2020/21 season meaning Herts/Middlesex 1 was not contested.

== Participating clubs 2019–20 ==
Team	Ground	Capacity	City/Area	Previous season
Bank Of England	Bank of England Sports Centre		Roehampton, London	7th
Barnet Elizabethans	Byng Road		Chipping Barnet, London	9th
Hendon	Copthall Playing Fields		Hendon, London	3rd
London Scottish Lions	King's House Sports Ground		Chiswick, London	Promoted from Herts/Middlesex 2 (champions)
Mill Hill	Champions Way		Mill Hill, London	Promoted from Herts/Middlesex 2 (runners up)
Saracens Amateurs	Bramley Sports Ground		Cockfosters, London	8th
St Albans	Boggymead Springs		St Albans, Hertfordshire	4th
Thamesians	Twickenham Green		Twickenham, London	10th
Verulamians	Cotlandswick		London Colney, Hertfordshire	Relegated from London 3 NW (12th)
Wasps FC	Twyford Avenue Sports Ground		Acton, London	6th

Locations of the 2019-20 Herts/Middlesex 1 teams in Hertfordshire
Locations of the 2019-20 Herts/Middlesex 1 teams in Greater London

== Participating clubs 2018–19 ==
Team	Ground	Capacity	City/Area	Previous season
Bank Of England	Bank of England Sports Centre		Roehampton, London	3rd
Barnet Elizabethans	Galley Lane		Chipping Barnet, London	6th
Finsbury Park	Downhills Park		West Green, London	Promoted from Herts/Middlesex 2 (champions)
Hendon	Copthall Playing Fields		Hendon, London	9th
Hitchin	King George V Playing Fields		Hitchin, Hertfordshire	Relegated from London 3 NW (12th)
Old Actonians	Old Actonians Sports Ground		Acton, London	7th
Saracens Amateurs	Bramley Sports Ground		Cockfosters, London	5th
St Albans	Boggymead Springs		St Albans, Hertfordshire	Relegated from London 3 NW (11th)
Staines	The Reeves		Feltham, London	4th
Thamesians	Twickenham Green		Twickenham, London	Promoted from Herts/Middlesex 2 (runners up)
UCS Old Boys	UCS Sports Ground		Cricklewood, London	10th
Wasps FC	Twyford Avenue Sports Ground		Acton, London	8th

Locations of the 2018-19 Herts/Middlesex 1 teams in Hertfordshire
Locations of the 2018-19 Herts/Middlesex 1 teams in Greater London

== Participating clubs 2017–18 ==
Team	Ground	Capacity	City/Area	Previous season
Bank Of England	Bank of England Sports Centre		Roehampton, London	Promoted from Herts/Middlesex 2 (champions)
Barnet Elizabethans	Galley Lane		Chipping Barnet, London	7th
Hendon	Copthall Playing Fields		Hendon, London	8th
London French	Barn Elms		Barnes, London	3rd
London Welsh	Old Deer Park	5,850	Richmond, London	5th
Old Actonians	Old Actonians Sports Ground		Acton, London	9th
Royston	The Heath Sports Centre		Royston, Hertfordshire	4th
Saracens Amateurs	Bramley Sports Ground		Cockfosters, London	6th
Staines	The Reeves		Feltham, London	Relegated from London 3 North West (12th)
UCS Old Boys	UCS Sports Ground		Cricklewood, London	11th (not relegated)
Wasps FC	Twyford Avenue Sports Ground		Acton, London	10th
Watford	Radlett Road		Watford, Hertfordshire	Promoted from Herts/Middlesex 2 (runners up)

Locations of the 2017-18 Herts/Middlesex 1 teams in Hertfordshire
Locations of the 2017-18 Herts/Middlesex 1 teams in Greater London

== Participating clubs 2016–17 ==
- Barnet Elizabethans
- Hendon (promoted from Herts/Middlesex 2)
- Hillingdon Abbots
- London French
- London Welsh Amateur
- Old Actonians (relegated from London 3 North West)
- Old Streetonians
- Royston
- Saracens Amateurs (promoted from Herts/Middlesex 2)
- U.C.S. Old Boys
- Old Verulamians
- Wasps (relegated from London 3 North West)

== Participating clubs 2015–16 ==
- Bank of England
- Barnet Elizabethans
- Cheshunt
- Hillingdon Abbots (promoted from Herts/Middlesex 2)
- London French (promoted from Herts/Middlesex 2)
- London Welsh Amateurs
- Old Millhillnians
- Old Streetonians (relegated from London 3 North West)
- Royston
- U.C.S. Old Boys (relegated from London 3 North West)
- Verulamians

== Participating clubs 2014–15 ==
- Bank of England
- Barnet Elizabethans
- Cheshunt
- Feltham (promoted from Herts/Middlesex 2)
- Haringey Rhinos
- Kilburn Cosmos
- London Nigerian (relegated from London 3 North West)
- London Welsh Amateurs (relegated from London 3 North West)
- Old Actonians
- Old Millhillians
- Royston
- Verulamians

== Participating clubs 2013–14 ==
- Bank of England
- Barnet Elizabethans (relegated from London 3 North West)
- Belsize Park
- Cheshunt (relegated from London 3 North West)
- Hackney
- Haringey Rhinos (relegated from London 3 North West)
- Imperial Medicals (relegated from London 3 North West)
- Kilburn Cosmos
- Old Actonians
- Old Millhillians
- Royston
- Verulamians

== Participating clubs 2012–13 ==
- Bank Of England
- Belsize Park
- Hackney
- Harlequin Amateurs
- Harrow
- Hendon
- London Welsh Amateurs
- Old Actonians
- Old Merchant Taylors'
- Old Millhillians
- Verulamians
- West London

== Participating clubs 2009–10 ==
- Harlequin Amateurs
- Hackney
- Hendon
- Old Ashmoleians
- Verulamians
- Old Actonians
- Old Priorians
- Saracens Amateurs
- Wasps

== Original teams ==
When this division was created in 1992 (as Herts/Middlesex) it contained the following teams:

- Antlers (Note: Currently known as Teddington RFC.) - promoted from Middlesex 2 (runners up)
- Centaurs - promoted from Middlesex 1 (5th)
- Haringey Rhinos - promoted from Middlesex 1 (3rd)
- Harrow - promoted from Middlesex 1 (4th)
- Hitchin - promoted from Hertfordshire 1 (3rd)
- Hemel Hempstead - relegated from London 3 North West (10th)
- Hendon - promoted from Middlesex 1 (8th)
- London New Zealand - promoted from Middlesex 1 (6th)
- Old Meadonians (Note: Old Meadonians would be renamed as Chiswick RFC in 1996.) - promoted from Middlesex 2 (champions)
- Stevenage Town - promoted from Hertfordshire 1 (3rd)
- St. Mary's Hospital (Note: In 1997 St. Mary's Hospital become part of Imperial Medicals Rugby Club.) - relegated from London 3 North West (11th)
- Twickenham - promoted from Middlesex 1 (9th)
- Uxbridge - promoted from Middlesex 1 (7th)

== Herts/Middlesex 1 honours ==
=== Herts/Middlesex (1992–93) ===
Originally known as Herts/Middlesex, this division was a tier 8 league with promotion to London 3 North West and relegation to either Hertfordshire 1 or Middlesex 1. The introduction of National 5 South ahead of the 1993–94 season meant that Herts/Middlesex dropped to become a tier 9 league.

Herts/Middlesex
Season	No of Teams	Champions	Runners–up	Relegated Teams
1992–93	13	Old Meadonians	London New Zealand	Stevenage Town, (Note: Stevenage Town were relegated to Hertfordshire 1.) Twickenham (Note: Twickenham were relegated to Middlesex 1.)
1993–94	13	Barnet	Old Millhillians	Antlers, Harrow (Note: Antlers and Harrow were both relegated to Middlesex 1.)
1994–95	13	Mill Hill	Fullerians	Harpenden, Hitchin (Note: Harpenden and Hitchin were both relegated to Hertfordshire 1.)
1995–96	13	Hampstead	Haringey Rhinos	London New Zealand, Upper Clapton (Note: London New Zealand and Upper Clapton were relegated to the newly introduced Herts/Middlesex 2.)
Green backgrounds are promotion places.

=== Herts/Middlesex 1 (1996–2000) ===
Restructuring of the leagues by the RFU, which included the cancellation of National 5 South and the merging of the Hertfordshire and Middlesex regional divisions, meant that Herts/Middlesex was renamed as Herts/Middlesex 1 and was once again a tier 8 league. Promotion continued to London 3 North West, while relegation was now to the new Herts/Middlesex 2.

Herts/Middlesex 1
Season	No of Teams	Champions	Runners–up	Relegated Teams
1996–97	13	Harpenden	St Albans (Note: League restructuring meant that the top eight clubs including Old Meadonians, Tring, Hackney, Uxbridge and Mill Hill were promoted to London 3 North West. 5th place Old Elizabethans were also due to be promoted but would instead merge with Barnet to form Barnet Elizabethans playing in London 2 North.)	No relegation (Note: League restructuring meant there was no relegation.)
1997–98	16	Twickenham	London Nigerian	Centaurs, Hendon, Wembley (Note: Relegated sides Centaurs and Wembley would drop out of the leagues.)
1998–99	14	Imperial Medicals	Hemel Hempstead	No relegation (Note: No relegation as division would increase from 14 to 15 teams the next season.)
1999–00	15	Bank Of England	London New Zealand	Multiple teams (Note: Relegated teams included Epping Upper Clapton, Hitchin, Old Haberdashers, H.A.C., Haringey Rhinos, U.C.S. Old Boys and CS Rugby 1863. The reason for so many relegated teams was due to league restructuring for the following season meaning that the division would decrease from 15 to 10 teams.)
Green backgrounds are promotion places.

=== Herts/Middlesex 1 (2000–2009) ===
The introduction of London 4 North West ahead of the 2000–01 season meant Herts/Middlesex 1 dropped to become a tier 9 league with promotion to this new division. Relegation continued to Herts/Middlesex 2.

Herts/Middlesex 1
Season	No of Teams	Champions	Runners–up	Relegated Teams
2000–01	10	Richmond	London Scottish	No relegation
2001–02	10	CS Rugby 1863	Old Hamptonians	Mill Hill, Uxbridge
2002–03	10	Haringey Rhinos	Enfield Ignatians	Feltham
2003–04	9	Tring	Stevenage Town	Chiswick
2004–05	10	Hitchin	Hammersmith & Fulham	Chess Valley, Hemel Hempstead, Old Actonians
2005–06	10	Finchley	U.C.S. Old Boys	Old Grammarians, Old Millhillians
2006–07	10	Hemel Hempstead	Old Ashmoleans	Harlequin Amateurs, Mill Hill, Cheshunt
2007–08	10	Chiswick	Old Merchant Taylors' Lambs (2nd XV)	No relegation
2008–09	10	Cheshunt	Old Streetonians	Old Millhillians
Green backgrounds are promotion places.

=== Herts/Middlesex 1 (2009–present) ===
Herts/Middlesex 1 remained a tier 9 league despite national league restructuring by the RFU. Promotion was to London 3 North West (formerly London 4 North West) and relegation to Herts/Middlesex 2.

Herts/Middlesex 1
Season	No of Teams	Champions	Runners–up	Relegated Teams
2009–10	10	Wasps Amateurs	Old Haberdashers	Hillingdon Abbots
2010–11	12	H.A.C.	London Welsh Amateurs	Kilburn Cosmos, Old Grammarians
2011–12	10	Wasps Amateurs	Old Priorians	Saracens Amateurs, Hendon, Harlequin Amateurs
2012–13	11	Harrow	Old Merchant Taylors'	West London, Hendon, London Welsh Amateurs
2013–14	12	Hackney	Belsize Park	Imperial Medicals
2014–15	12	Old Actonians	London Nigerian	Feltham, Haringey Rhinos
2015–16	12	Kilburn Cosmos	Cheshunt	Old Millhillians, Bank Of England
2016–17	11	Verulamians	Old Streetonians	Hillingdon Abbots RFC
2017–18	12	London Welsh	Royston	London French, Watford
2018–19	12	Hitchin	Finsbury Park	Staines, Old Actonians
2019–20	10 (Note: League reduced from 12 to 10 teams after UCS Old Boys drop out.)	Hendon	St Albans	Mill Hill
2020–21	10			
Green backgrounds are promotion places.

== Number of league titles ==
- Chiswick (2) (Note: Chiswick's titles include one won when known as Old Meadowians RFC.)
- Hitchin (2)
- Wasps Amateurs (2)
- Bank Of England (1)
- Barnet (1)
- Cheshunt (1)
- CS Rugby 1863 (1)
- Finchley (1)
- H.A.C. (1)
- Hackney (1)
- Hampstead (1)
- Haringey Rhinos (1)
- Harpenden (1)
- Harrow (1)
- Hemel Hempstead (1)
- Hendon (1)
- Imperial Medicals (1)
- Kilburn Cosmos (1)
- London Welsh (1)
- Mill Hill (1)
- Old Actonians (1)
- Richmond (1)
- Tring (1)
- Twickenham (1)
- Verulamians (1)

== See also ==
- London & SE Division RFU
- Hertfordshire RFU
- Middlesex RFU
- English rugby union system
- Rugby union in England
