= Counties 2 Middlesex =

English rugby union league

- Sport: Rugby union
- Instituted: 1987; 39 years ago
- Country: England

Counties 2 Middlesex (formerly Middlesex 2) is a level 8 Rugby Union league with teams from North-West London taking part. Historically the league was a level 11 completion and the division was cancelled at the end of the 1995–96 campaign due to the merger of the Hertfordshire and Middlesex regional leagues. After nearly 20 years, ahead of the 2025–26 season the league was reinstated as a decision was taken to once more split out Hertfordshire RFU and Middlesex RFU clubs.

Promoted teams typically move up to Counties 1 Middlesex and relegated sides move down to the Middlesex RFU merit tables.

== 2026-27 ==
Departing were Hackney promoted to Counties 1 Middlesex.

Team	Ground	Capacity	City/Area	Previous season
Actonians	Old Actonians Sports Ground		Acton, London	5th
Barnet Elizabethans	Byng Road		Chipping Barnet, London	2nd
Ealing Trailfinders 1871 2XV	Trailfinders Sports Ground	4,000	West Ealing, London	New entry
Enfield Ignatians	Donkey Lane		Enfield, London, London	6th
Finsbury Park	Downhills Park		West Green, London	7th
Hammersmith & Fulham 2XV	Hurlingham Park		Fulham, London	New entry
Harrow	Grove Field		Stanmore, London	3rd
Hendon	Copthall Playing Fields		Hendon, London	Re-entry
Kilburn Cosmos	Gladstone Park		Kilburn, London	4th
Old Millhillians	Mill Hill School		Mill Hill, London	8th
Saracens Amateurs	Bramley Sports Ground		Cockfosters, London	Relegated from Counties 1 Middlesex
West London	Marathon Playing Field		Greenford, London	New entry

Locations of the 2026-27 Counties 2 Middlesex teams

== Participating clubs 2025–26 ==
The league was made up of teams who moved on a level transfer from Counties 2 Herts/Middlesex with others drawn up from Counties 3 Herts/Middlesex as both leagues were, effective from this season, exclusively for Hertfordshire RFU clubs.

After 14 rounds of fixtures the league will split into a 'Trophy' for the clubs placed 1st-4th with a 'Shield' for those in 5th-8th resulting in an additional six fixtures for all teams to contest.

Team	Ground	Capacity	City/Area	Previous season
Actonians	Old Actonians Sports Ground		Acton, London	Promoted from Counties 3 Herts/Middlesex (4th)
Barnet Elizabethans	Byng Road		Chipping Barnet, London	Level transfer from Counties 2 Herts/Middlesex (10th)
Enfield Ignatians	Donkey Lane		Enfield, London, London	Level transfer from Counties 2 Herts/Middlesex (7th)
Finsbury Park	Downhills Park		West Green, London	Promoted from Counties 3 Herts/Middlesex (5th)
Hackney	Spring Hill Recreation Ground		Upper Clapton, London	Relegated from Counties 1 Herts/Middlesex (11th)
Harrow	Grove Field		Stanmore, London	Level transfer from Counties 2 Herts/Middlesex (4th)
Kilburn Cosmos	Gladstone Park		Kilburn, London	Promoted from Counties 3 Herts/Middlesex (6th)
Old Millhillians	Mill Hill School		Mill Hill, London	Level transfer from Counties 2 Herts/Middlesex (11th)

Locations of the 2025-26 Counties 2 Middlesex teams

== 1996–2025 ==
Not contested

== Original teams ==
When league rugby began in 1987 this division contained the following teams:

- Antlers (Note: Currently known as Teddington RFC.)
- Barclays Bank
- Centaurs
- CS Stags 1863
- Hackney
- London Cornish
- Old Abbots (Note: Currently known as Hillingdon Abbots RFC.)
- Old Hamptonians
- Osterley
- Pinner & Grammarians (Note: Currently known as Pinner RFC.)
- St. Bart's Hospital (Note: Would merge with London Hospital RFC in 1995 to form Barts and the London RFC.)
- Thamesians

== Middlesex 2 honours ==
=== Middlesex 2 (1987–1992) ===
The original Middlesex 2 was a tier 9 league with promotion up to Middlesex 1 and relegation was to Middlesex 3.

Middlesex 2
Season	No of Teams	Champions	Runners–up	Relegated Teams
1987–88	12	Old Abbots	Centaurs	Pinner & Grammarians, Antlers
1988–89	11	Old Millhillians	Old Meadonians	Hammersmith & Fulham, Old Hamptonians, Thamesians
1989–90	11	Hackney	Old Abbots	Barclays Bank, Osterley
1990–91	11	Haringey Rhinos	Old Millhillians	St. Bart's Hospital, Old Paulines
1991–92	11	Old Meadonians (Note: Champions Old Meadonians were promoted two levels up into the new Herts/Middlesex division.)	Antlers (Note: Runners up Antlers were also promoted two levels up into the new Herts/Middlesex division. Teams ranked 3rd to 11th were promoted into Middlesex 1 as part of the league restructuring.)	No relegation (Note: Due to restructuring of the Hertfordshire and Middlesex leagues there was no relegation this season.)
Green backgrounds are promotion places.

=== Middlesex 2 (1992–1996) ===
The creation of Herts/Middlesex at the beginning of the 1992–93 season meant that Middlesex 2 dropped to become a tier 10 league. The introduction of National 5 South for the 1993–94 season meant that Middlesex 3 dropped another level to become a tier 11 league for the years that National 5 South was active. Promotion continued to Middlesex 1 and relegation to Middlesex 3. The merging of the Hertfordshire and Middlesex regional divisions at the end of the 1995–96 season meant that Middlesex 2 was cancelled.

Middlesex 2
Season	No of Teams	Champions	Runners–up	Relegated Teams
1992–93	13	Old Hamptonians	Actonians	St. Bart's Hospital, Old Tottonians
1993–94	13	Old Paulines	Belsize Park	Osterley, Orleans FP, London Cornish
1994–95	13	London Nigerian	HAC	No relegation
1995–96	13	Enfield Ignatians (Note: The merging of the Herts/Middlesex regional divisions saw champions Enfield Ignatians promoted into Herts/Middlesex 2.)	Old Abbots (Note: The merging of the Herts/Middlesex regional divisions saw runners up Old Abbots transferred into Herts/Middlesex 3 along with Barclays Bank, Antlers, London French, Bank Of England and London Exiles.)	No relegation (Note: Although there would be no relegation, all remaining teams would be transferred into the new Herts/Middlesex leagues - Feltham, Hammersmith & Fulham, Old Isleworthians, Pinner & Grammarians and Hayes would join Herts/Middlesex 4. 11th place Thamesians would drop out of the leagues before the start of the new season.)
Green backgrounds are promotion places.

== Number of league titles ==
- Enfield Ignatians (1)
- Hackney (1)
- Haringey Rhinos (1)
- London Nigerian (1)
- Old Abbots (1) (Note: Currently known as Hillingdon Abbots RFC.)
- Old Hamptonians (1)
- Old Meadonians (Note: Currently known as Chiswick RFC.)
- Old Millhillians (1)
- Old Paulines (1)

== See also ==
- London & SE Division RFU
- Middlesex RFU
- English rugby union system
- Rugby union in England
