= Counties 1 Middlesex =

English Rugby Union league

Counties 1 Middlx
- Current season or competition: 2025–26
- Sport: Rugby union
- Instituted: 1987; 39 years ago
- Number of teams: 12
- Country: England
- Holders: Hackney (1st title) (1995–96) (promoted to Herts/Middlesex 1)

Counties 1 Middlesex (formerly Middlesex 1) is a level 7 Rugby Union league with teams from north-west London taking part. Historically, the league was a level 10 completion, and the division was cancelled at the end of the 1995–96 campaign after nine seasons due to the merger of the Hertfordshire and Middlesex regional leagues. After nearly twenty years, ahead of the 2025–26 season, the league was re-formed following the decision to have mostly Hertfordshire teams in Counties 1 Hertfordshire. Promoted teams typically move up to Regional 2 Thames and relegated sides go down to Counties 2 Middlesex.

== 2026–27 ==
Departing were champions Ealing Trailfinders 1871 promoted to Regional 2 Thames together with runners-up Finchley promoted to Regional 2 Anglia, while Saracens Amateurs (10th) were relegated to Counties 2 Middlesex.

Team	Ground	Capacity	City/Area	Previous season
Belsize Park 2XV	Regent's Park		Belsize Park, London	New entry
Chiswick	Dukes Meadows		Chiswick, London	5th
CS Stags 2s	King's House Sports Ground		Chiswick, London	New entry
Hackney	Spring Hill Recreation Ground		Upper Clapton, London	Promoted from Counties 2 Middlesex
Hampstead	Parliament Hill Fields		Highgate, London	4th
London Scottish Bs	King's House Sports Ground		Chiswick, London	New entry
London Welsh Druids	Old Deer Park		Richmond, London	New entry
Old Haberdashers	Croxdale Road		Borehamwood, Hertfordshire	3rd
Old Streetonians	Haggerston Park		Shoreditch, London	6th
Ruislip	West End Road		Ruislip, London	7th
UCS Old Boys	UCS Sports Ground		Cricklewood, London	9th
Wasps FC	Twyford Avenue Sports Ground		Acton, London	8th

Locations of the 2026–27 Counties 1 Middlesex teams

== 2025–26 ==
=== Participating clubs and locations ===
This is the first season in which Hertfordshire RFU and Middlesex RFU clubs from Counties 1 Herts/Middlesex moved to their respective county leagues. Teams in this league were level transferred from Counties 1 Herts/Middlesex or were promoted from Counties 2 Hert/Middlesex.

Team	Ground	Capacity	City/Area	Previous season
Chiswick	Dukes Meadows		Chiswick, London	Level transfer from Counties 1 Herts/Middlesex (9th)
Ealing Trailfinders 1871	Trailfinders Sports Ground	4,000	West Ealing, London	Level transfer from Counties 1 Herts/Middlesex (4th)
Finchley	Summers Lane	1,000	Finchley, London	Level transfer from Counties 1 Herts/Middlesex (3rd)
Hampstead	Parliament Hill Fields		Highgate, London	Promoted from Counties 2 Herts/Middlesex (champions)
Old Haberdashers	Croxdale Road		Borehamwood, Hertfordshire	Relegated from Regional 2 Thames (12th)
Old Streetonians	Haggerston Park		Shoreditch, London	Level transfer from Counties 1 Herts/Middlesex (5th)
Ruislip	West End Road		Ruislip, London	Level transfer from Counties 1 Herts/Middlesex (6th)
Saracens Amateurs	Bramley Sports Ground		Cockfosters, London	Promoted from Counties 2 Herts/Middlesex (3rd)
UCS Old Boys	UCS Sports Ground		Cricklewood, London	Promoted from Counties 2 Herts/Middlesex (5th)
Wasps FC	Twyford Avenue Sports Ground		Acton, London	Promoted from Counties 2 Herts/Middlesex (2nd)

Locations of the 2025–26 Counties 1 Middlesex teams

== 1996–2025 ==
Not contested

== Original teams ==
When league rugby began in 1987 this division contained the following teams:

- Finchley
- Hampstead
- Lensbury
- London New Zealand
- Old Haberdashers
- Old Meadonians (Note: Old Meadonians would be renamed as Chiswick RFC in 1996.)
- Old Millhillians
- Orleans FP
- Staines
- Sudbury Court
- Uxbridge

== Middlesex 1 honours ==
=== Middlesex 1 (1987–1992) ===
The original Middlesex 1 was a tier 8 league with promotion to London 3 North West and relegation to Middlesex 2.

Middlesex 1
Season	No of teams	Champions	Runners–up	Relegated teams
1987–88	11	Finchley	Staines	Old Millhillians, Orleans FP, Old Meadonians
1988–89	11	Twickenham	London New Zealand	Old Abbots, Old Paulines, Old Haberdashers
1989–90	11	Uxbridge	London New Zealand	Old Millhillians, Hampstead
1990–91	11	Lensbury	Staines	Old Abbots, Old Meadonians, Sudbury Court
1991–92	11	Staines	Old Millhillians (Note: League restructuring for the following season due to the creation of the new Herts/Middlesex division, meant that there were multiple promotions from the league. Runners up Old Millhillians were promoted to London 3 North West along with champions Staines, while seven clubs ranked from 3rd to 9th were promoted into the new Herts/Middlesex division, including Haringey Rhinos, Harrow, Centaurs, London New Zealand, Uxbridge, Hendon and Twickenham. The bottom two sides - Mill Hill and Hackney - would remain in Middlesex 1.)	No relegation (Note: The creation of Herts/Middlesex for the following season meant that there was no relegation.)
Green backgrounds are promotion places.

=== Middlesex 1 (1992–1996) ===
The creation of Herts/Middlesex at the beginning of the 1992–93 season meant that Middlesex 1 dropped to become a tier 9 league. The introduction of National 5 South for the 1993–94 season meant that Middlesex 1 dropped another level to become a tier 10 league for the years that National 5 South was active. Promotion was into the new Herts/Middlesex league while relegation continued to Middlesex 2. The merging of the Hertfordshire and Middlesex regional divisions at the end of the 1995–96 season meant that Middlesex 1 was cancelled.

Middlesex 1
Season	No of teams	Champions	Runners–up	Relegated teams
1992–93	13	Hampstead	Mill Hill	Orleans FP, Old Grammarians
1993–94	13	Mill Hill	Roxeth Manor Old Boys	Hammersmith & Fulham, Old Isleworthians
1994–95	13	Old Hamptonians	Wembley	Antlers
1995–96	13	Hackney (Note: Champions Hackney would be promoted into the newly named Herts/Middlesex 1.)	London Nigerian (Note: The merging of the Herts/Middlesex regional divisions saw runners up London Nigerian were transferred into Herts/Middlesex 3.)	No relegation (Note: Although there would be no relegation, all remaining teams would be transferred into the new Herts/Middlesex leagues - CS Stags 1863, Harrow, Old Haberdashers, HAC, Old Paulines, Wembley, Twickenham and Actonians would join Herts/Middlesex 2; Roxeth Manor Old Boys and Sudbury Court would join Herts/Middlesex 3. Bottom club Belsize Park would drop out of the leagues before the start of the new season.)
Green backgrounds are promotion places.

== Number of league titles ==
- Finchley (1)
- Hackney (1)
- Hampstead (1)
- Lensbury (1)
- Mill Hill (1)
- Old Hamptonians (1)
- Staines (1)
- Twickenham (1)
- Uxbridge (1)

== See also ==
- London & SE Division RFU
- Middlesex RFU
- English rugby union system
- Rugby union in England
