= Wasps FC =

English rugby union club, based in London

(England) Wasps Football Club
- Union: Middlesex RFU
- Founded: 1867
- Location: Acton, Ealing, London, England
- Ground: Twyford Avenue Sports Ground
- Chairman: Richard Green
- President: Solomon N'Jie
- Coach: Hugo Lewis
- League: Counties 1 Middlesex

Official website
- www.waspsfc.co.uk

Wasps FC is an English amateur rugby union club formed in 1867. Based in Acton, West London, the club was playing in Counties 2 as of 2023.

== History ==
The men's first team was split from Wasps FC at the turn of professionalism, for the 1996–97 season, to become Wasps RFC, who formerly played at the Coventry Building Society Arena in Coventry. The men's team currently play rugby in the Counties 1 Middlesex league. Wasps Women compete in the Premier 15s, the highest women's league in the country, the ladies section has been established since 1984 and have consistently been a top seven team in the country. Wasps Women have attracted elite athletes from around the world including England international Danielle Waterman and global brand sponsors. Wasps FC owns the Twyford Avenue Sports Ground that was also used by the Wasps professional teams for training until the end of the 2015–16 season.

Wasps FC retains close links with their professional brothers and still owns approximately 5% of Wasps RFC.

The youth section has several championship sides and the minis compete actively at the higher levels.

== Ground ==
Wasps FC play their home games at Twyford Avenue Sport Ground, in Acton.

== Men's seasons ==
=== Men 2026-27 ===
The first team are competing in Counties 1 Middlesex. The 2XV are competing in the Middlesex Merit Table Division 2. The Vets are competing in the Middlesex Vets League

=== Men 2025-26 Season ===
The first team finished 8th in Counties 1 Middlesex. The 2XV finished 6th in Middlesex Merit Table Division 2. The Vets finished 2nd in the Middlesex Vets League

=== Men 2024–25 season ===
The first team finished 2nd in the Counties 2 Herts & Middlesex league and were promoted to Counties 1 Middlesex.

=== Men 2023–24 season ===
The first team finished 3rd in the Counties 2 Herts & Middlesex league.

=== Men 2022–23 season ===
The first team finished 5th in the new Counties 2 Herts & Middlesex league.

=== Men 2021–22 season ===
The first team finished 4th in the Herts & Middlesex 1 league.

=== Men 2019–20 season ===
The first team finished 4th in the Herts & Middlesex 1 league.

=== Men 2018–19 season ===
The first team finished 6th in the Herts & Middlesex 1 league.

=== Men 2017–18 season ===
The first team finished 6th in the Herts & Middlesex 1 league.

=== Men 2016–17 season ===
The 1st XV finished 10th in Herts/Middlesex 1

=== Men 2015–16 season ===
The 1st XV finished 12th in London 3 North West

=== Men 2014–15 season ===
The first team finished tenth in their league, and the second team was relegated to the third (of 6) divisions in the Middlesex Merit Table for 2015-16.

=== Men 2013–14 season ===
The first team finished fourth in their league, and the second team remained in the second (of 6) divisions in the Middlesex Merit Table for 2014-15. The third team, "The Fat Dads" (though not many are fat), continued to play friendlies and were inaugural members of the Middlesex Social League.

=== Men 2012–13 season ===
In 2012-13 the first XV finished mid-table in London 3 North West. The second XV finished 3rd in Middlesex Merit Table 3 and was promoted into Middlesex Merit Table 2.

=== Men 2011–12 season ===
In 2011-12 the first XV had a record-breaking season, winning all 18 games in Herts & Middlesex 1 to gain promotion to London 3 North West. Highlights included doing the double over both Hackney RFC and Old Priorians RFC, the closest challengers for the title.

=== Men 2010–11 season ===
In 2010-11 the first XV was relegated from London 3 North West back to Herts & Middlesex 1. The second XV competed in the Middlesex Merit Table 4 league.

=== Men 2009–10 season ===
The 2009-10 season was a very successful one for Wasps FC. Fielding two senior men's sides, the first XV won promotion from Herts & Middlesex 1 into London 3 North West and the second XV won the Middlesex Merit Table 5 League, gaining promotion into the Middlesex Merit Table 4 league in the process. On the back of these successes, it was announced the club would once again be fielding a third XV for the 2010-11 season.

== Women's seasons ==
=== Ladies 2022–23 season ===
The 1st XV finished 10th in Allianz Premier 15s and finished a 38-year stay in the top division of Women's Rugby. The Amateur Women continued as Wasps FC Women in tier 4 of Women's Rugby

The Amateur Women won all but 3 games during the entire season and finished 2nd in Women's NC 1 South East (West)

Ahead of the 2022-23 season, Wasps FC Ladies assumed the Wasps Women name under the professional umbrella with the 2nd XV already under the Wasps FC Amateur Women name in the playing pyramid

=== Ladies 2021–22 season ===
The 1st XV finished 5th in Allianz Premier 15s

The 2nd XV finished 8th in Women's Championship South West 2.

=== Ladies 2020–21 season ===
The 1st XV finished 3rd in Allianz Premier 15s and qualified for the play-offs, narrowly losing to Harlequins Women in the semi-finals.

The Amateur Women's season was postponed due to COVID-19

=== Ladies 2019–20 season ===
Wasps FC Ladies gained sponsorship from global brand Vodafone UK alongside Wasps RFC and Wasps Netball, bringing together the entire Wasps brand.

The 1st XV's season was stopped due to COVID-19 on 16 March 2020. The 1st XV finished 5th in the Tyrrells Premier 15s League.

The Amateur Women's season was stopped due to COVID-19 on 16 March 2020. The Amateur Women finished 3rd in the Tyrrells Premier 15s Development League

=== Ladies 2018–19 season ===
The 1st XV placed 4th in the league and were beaten by Saracens Women in the Premier 15s semi final.

The 2nd XV won all but 2 games during the entire season and finished 2nd in the Development League.

=== Ladies 2017–18 season ===
The 1st XV placed 3rd in the league and were beaten by Harlequins in the Premier 15s double-legged semi final.

The 2nd XV won all but 2 games during the entire season and finished 2nd in the Development League.

=== Ladies 2016–17 season ===
The 1st XV finished 6th in Women's Premiership

The Amateur Women finished 5th in Women's Championship South 1

=== Ladies 2015–16 season ===
The 1st XV finished 6th in Women's Premiership

The Amateur Women finished 7th in Women's Championship South 1

=== Ladies 2014–15 season ===
The 1st XV finished 6th in Women's Premiership

The Amateur Women finished 1st in Women's Championship South West 2

=== Ladies 2013–14 season ===
The 1st XV finished 7th in Women's Premiership

The Amateur Women finished 4th in Women's Championship South West 2

=== Ladies 2012–13 season ===
The 1st XV finished 5th in Women's Premiership

The Amateur Women finished 7th in Women's Championship South 1

=== Ladies 2011–12 season ===
The 1st XV finished 4th in Women's Premiership

The Amateur Women finished 7th in RFUW Championship South 1

=== Ladies 2010–11 season ===
The 1st XV finished 2nd in RFUW Premiership

The Amateur Women finished 3rd in RFUW Championship South 1

=== Ladies 2009–10 season ===
The 1st XV finished 6th in RFUW Premiership

=== Ladies 2007–08 season ===
The 1st XV finished 2nd in RFUW Premiership

== Honours ==
- Middlesex 7s winners (4): 1948, 1952, 1985, 1993
- Middlesex Senior Cup winners (8): 1974, 1975, 1977, 1978, 1979, 1982, 1984, 1987
- Herts/Middlesex 3 South champions (2): 2000–01, 2001–02
- Herts/Middlesex 1 champions (2): 2009–10, 2011–12
