= Middlesex Rugby Football Union =

(England) Middlesex RFU
- Full name: Middlesex Rugby Football Union
- Union: RFU
- Founded: 1879; 147 years ago
- Region: London
- Chairman: Peter Baveystock(Grasshoppers RFC)
- President: Tom Brownsell(Hendon RFC)
Team kit

Official website
- www.middlesexrugby.com

Middlesex Rugby is the governing body for rugby union in the former county of Middlesex, England. Middlesex is a historic county of England that covered areas that are now part of London, Surrey and Hertfordshire. The historic county is still in use when referring to sport. Middlesex RFU was originally created as the Middlesex County Rugby Club but within six years was being referred to as the Middlesex County Rugby Football Union and is now known simply as Middlesex Rugby.

== History ==
FR Adams Esq of Richmond F.C. called a meeting at the Bedford Hotel at which a resolution was passed bringing the club into being. He served as the Club and Union's first president until 1883 being succeeded by E. Temple Gurdon (also of Richmond F.C.).

== Middlesex Sevens ==
The world-famous Middlesex Sevens were organised by Dr. Russell-Cargill and the Middlesex Hon. Secretary CS Bongard, the first tournament taking place according to one source in 1925 and others in 1926. This was the first seven-a-side rugby festival in England. The first tournament took place at Twickenham in aid of Middlesex hospital was won by Harlequins.

== Union officials ==
=== Past Presidents ===
- 2025-Present Andrew Smart (Harrow)
- 2023–2025 Nigel Orton (Schools RFU Middlesex)
- 2020-2023 Peter Baveystock (Grasshoppers RFC)
- 2019-2020 Bob Lawless (Staines RFC)
- 2016–2019 Tom Brownsell (Hendon RFC)
- 2014–2016 Brian East (Belsize Park RFC)
- 2012-2014 Michael Barnes (Pinner & Grammarians)
- 2010–2012 Paul Astbury (Centaurs RFC)
- 2008–2010 John Gunner (Rosslyn Park F.C.)
- 2005–2008 Andy Mortimer (Old Millhillians RFC)
- 2003–2005 Brian Martin (Chiswick RFC)
- 2001–2003 Keith King (Chiswick RFC)
- 2000–2001 Derek Mann (Barclays Bank RFC)
- 1997–2000 David Ransom (Harrow RFC)
- 1994–1997 Richard Gray (Mill Hill RFC)
- 1991–1994 Charles Madge (Old Paulines RFC)
- 1988–1991 Mike Christie (Old Merchant Taylors' FC)
- 1985–1988 Sir Peter Yarranton (Wasps FC) *
- 1982–1985 Cyril Brandon (Centaurs RFC)
- 1979–1982 Albert Agar (Harlequin F.C.) *
- 1976–1979 Aubrey Partner (Staines RFC)
- 1973–1976 Dick Storry Deans (Rosslyn Park F.C.)
- 1970–1973 Barry Boyden OBE (Westminster Bank RFC)
- 1969–1970 KH Chapman (Harlequin F.C.) *
- 1966–1969 George Barry MBE (London Irish RFC)
- 1963–1966 Ronnie Sawyer (Wasps FC)
- 1960–1963 Charles Hopwood MA (Richmond F.C.)
- 1957–1960 Cyril Gadney MBE (Pinner RFC) * **
- 1955–1957 William Ramsey (Old Millhillians RFC) *
- 1950–1955 RH O'Brien (Richmond F.C.)
- 1946–1950 Sir Wavell Wakefield MP (Harlequin F.C.) *
- 1937–1946 HB Hayes (Old Merchant Taylors' FC)
- 1935–1937 Dr Russell Cargill (London Scottish RFC)
- 1934–1935 W Williams (Harlequin F.C.)
- 1933–1934 JL Bongard (Saracens RFC)
- 1929–1933 Ernest Prescott (Old Merchant Taylors' FC) *
- 1883–1929 Edward Temple Gurdon (Richmond F.C.) *
- 1879–1883 FR Adam (Richmond F.C.)

Asterisk denotes President of the R.F.U.
Two asterisks denotes member of the International Rugby Board

=== Honorary Secretaries ===
- 2016-Present Dr Tim Miller
- 2010-2016 Steve Rac
- 2004–2010 Brian East
- 1996–2004 David Hiles
- 1986–1996 Graeme Cattermole
- 1979–1986 Derek Mann
- 1972–1979 Mike Christie
- 1970–1972 CH Brandon
- 1959–1970 Barry Boyden
- 1957–1959 JRC Matthews
- 1950–1957 Cyril Gadney
- 1946–1950 Sir W Ramsey
- 1923–1946 CS Bongard
- 1920–1923 RH Haxell
- 1913–1920 JC Jenkins
- 1892–1913 RC Hodgson
- 1889–1892 HL Ashmore
- 1886–1889 JH Roberts
- 1882–1886 FW Collins
- 1881–1882 A Ward
- 1881–1881 HL Ashmore
- 1879–1880 HP Gardner

=== Honorary Treasurers ===
- 2019-Present Charles Portsmouth
- 2014-2019 Eddie Keal
- 2011-2014 Michael Maillou
- 2004-2011 Tom Brownsell
- 2001–2004 Michael Barnes
- 1991–2001 Keith King
- 1976–1991 AT White
- 1961–1976 WMD Lewis
- 1959–1961 JM Grammer
- 1955–1959 Albert Agar
- 1948–1955 AG Watson
- 1946–1948 HJ Brewer & A.G Watson
- 1928–1946 JL Bongard & H.J Brewer
- 1919–1928 JL Bongard
- 1904–1919 JN Hill
- 1902–1904 RJ Hodgson
- 1889–1902 HL Ashmore
- 1886–1889 JH Roberts
- 1882–1886 FW Collins
- 1881–1882 A Ward
- 1880–1881 HL Ashmore
- 1879–1880 HP Gardner

=== Members who were Presidents of the RFU ===
- 1991–1992 Sir Peter Yarranton
- 1984–1985 AE Agar
- 1974–1975 KH Chapman
- 1962–1963 CH Gadney
- 1954–1955 WC Ramsay
- 1950–1951 Sir Wavell Wakefield
- 1920–1922 E Prescott
- 1896–1898 RW Whalley
- 1890–1892 ET Gurton

== County side ==
Current Kit

Middlesex County Rugby Union was originally created as a rugby club and as such fulfilled fixtures for six years before becoming the Union for clubs within the county. After becoming a union the club continued to operate selecting players from its constituent clubs to play representative matches for the county and to go on tours.

Very early in its history, Middlesex played Surrey under floodlights at the Old Deer Park. This is possibly the first rugby match played under floodlights as electric light had only just been invented. A floodlit game was the ideal opportunity to try out the new technology although the game was not a great success by all accounts.

On 24 October 1905, Middlesex played the touring South African side at Richmond for their ninth match. The Springboks won 9 – 0, their narrowest score so far in the tour; a penalty by Douglas Morkel and try by Brink made the half time score 6 – 0 whilst in the second half the only points came from a try by Loubser. Middlesex fielded a cosmopolitan team including Jim Louwrens the South African College scrum half of 1901, three Welshmen who were also later to play for Wales (Harding, Jenkins & Williams) and the Scottish international Geddes. The match referee was Cartwright.

On 2 September 1964 Staines RFC played a Middlesex XV on the occasion of the opening of their new ground, "The Reeves".

=== English County championship ===
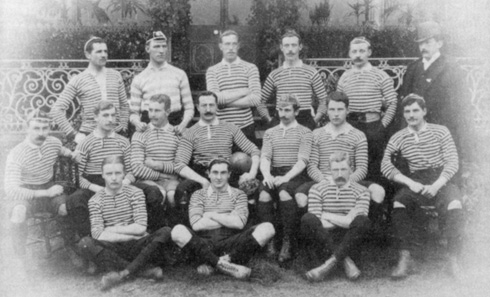
The Middlesex team that played the 1888–89 New Zealand Native football team on 22 October 1888

Middlesex appearances in English County Championship Finals
Year	Winners	Opponents	Score	Venue
1893	Yorkshire	Cumberland, Devon, Middlesex		
1905	Durham County	Middlesex	9–8	West Hartlepool
1929	Middlesex	Lancashire	8–8	Twickenham
1929	Middlesex	Lancashire	8–9	St Anthony's Road ground, Blundellsands
1951	East Midlands	Middlesex	10–0	Northampton
1952	Middlesex	Lancashire	9–6	Twickenham
1954	Middlesex	Lancashire	6–24	St Anthony's Road ground, Blundellsands
1955	Lancashire	Middlesex	8–14	Twickenham
1956	Middlesex	Devon	13–9	Twickenham
1966	Middlesex	Lancashire	0–6	St Anthony's Road ground, Blundellsands
1968	Middlesex	Warwickshire	9–6	Twickenham
1976	Gloucestershire	Middlesex	9–24	Athletic Ground, Richmond
1977	Lancashire	Middlesex	17–6	St Anthony's Road ground, Blundellsands
1979	Middlesex	Northumberland	19–6	Twickenham
1985	Middlesex	Notts, Lincs & Derby	12–9	Twickenham
1987	Yorkshire	Middlesex	22–11	Twickenham
1990	Lancashire	Middlesex	32–9	Twickenham

=== 1968 tour of East Africa ===
Middlesex were the English county champions for the sixth time in 1968, having defeated Warwickshire in the final (tries by Brian Stoneman and Sandy Hinshelwood helped them to their 9–6 win at Twickenham). At least ten of the players that had participated in the final went on the tour in July of that year. Middlesex played a total of seven matches on a tour that lasted a little over two weeks, two games being played in Uganda and five in Kenya. The tourists won all seven matches comfortably and reported that the standard of rugby in the region had dropped noticeably since some members of the touring party had last played there. It was generally felt that the East African sides lacked stamina and tactical nous; the latter is understandable as the opportunities for playing high level rugby in the region were limited, though the former is surprising as much of the region is at altitude and it would be expected that the visitors would suffer more than the hosts.

The Middlesex tour party consisted of 70 members though the minority of these were players, the majority were officials and non-playing members who were travelling as supporters. Amongst the players, at least three had previously toured East Africa; Patrick Orr (twice, with Anti-Assassins in 1965 and Richmond F. C. in 1963), Chris Ralston (with Richmond F. C. in 1963) and Brian Stoneman (twice, with Richmond F. C. and Combined (Oxford and Cambridge) Universities, both in 1963).

- Tony Miles (Wasps FC)
- Francis Mann (Old Millhillians RFC)
- Dick Bateman (Richmond F.C.)
- Mike Ireland (Wasps FC)
- Brian Stoneman (Richmond F.C.)
- Jim Kent (Wasps FC)
- Ernie Preece (Richmond F.C.)
- Elwyn Lloyd (St Bartholomew's Hospital RFC)
- Patrick Orr (Harlequin F.C.)
- Chris Ralston (Richmond F.C.)
- Ian Jones (London Welsh RFC)
- Brian Goodchild (Saracens RFC)
- Charles Thorburn (Guy's Hospital RFC)
- Alistair Boyle (London Scottish RFC)
- Andrew Mortimer (Wasps FC)
- Keith McIntyre (St Bartholomew's Hospital RFC)
- William Macdonald (London Scottish RFC)
- Ricky Parsons (Wasps FC)
- Hamish Keith (Wasps FC)
- Tim Rutter (Harlequin F.C.)
- Roger Weaver (Saracens RFC)
- Mike Alder (Saracens RFC)
- Robin Jolliffe (Richmond F.C.)

Matches and Results
Date	Opposition	Location	Result	Score
1968-07-06	Uganda	Kampala	won	5–47
1968-07-08	Uganda Invitation XV	Entebbe	won	0–32
1968-07-10	West Kenya Province	Eldoret	won	3–57
1968-07-13	Central Province	Nairobi	won	6–35
1968-07-14	Scorpions RFC	RFUEA Ground, Nairobi	won	0–47
1968-07-17	Coast Invitation XV	Mombasa	won	0–16
1968-07-20	East Africa	RFUEA Ground, Nairobi	won	0–28

Middlesex scored 262 points in seven matches, an average of more than 37 per game. In total they conceded only 14 points. They scored 61 tries, 32 conversions, three penalty-goals and two dropped-goals. Top scorer was Gordon MacDonald (45 points, all from goal-kicking), Ricky Parsons was second highest scorer (33 points, from 5 tries, the rest from goal-kicking), Mike Alder was third (31 points from 6 tries, the rest from goal-kicking). Top try scorers were Tim Rutter and Robin Jolliffe (7 each), Mike Alder and Roger Weaver (6 each). Francis Mann was the outstanding player of the tour.

The tour had been organised by the Middlesex Hon. Secretary Barry Boyden, his assistant Cyril Brandon and the RFUEA's appointed Tour Chairman Bernard Nicholls. As with all rugby tours to East Africa in the 1950s, 1960s and 1970s, it would not have been possible without the hosting arrangements offered by the rugby fraternity in Kenya and Uganda; in order to cut down on costs, members of the tour party were welcomed into the homes of the hosts and provided for in a manner that was acclaimed by those that were lucky enough to have toured the region. Hence the frequency with which first time tourists rapidly made certain they returned a second or third time.

=== Notable players ===
These players have played test rugby.

- Lawrence Dallaglio, (Wasps FC, England, Lions and Barbarian F.C.)
- Rob Lozowski (Wasps FC, England and Barbarian F.C.)
- Chris Sheasby (Harlequin F.C., and England)
- Bob Mordell (Wasps FC, Harlequin F.C., and England)
- John Dawes (London Welsh RFC, Wales, Lions and Barbarian F.C.)
- Sandy Hinshelwood (London Scottish, Scotland and Lions)
- Ian Conin Jones (London Welsh RFC and Wales)
- George James
- Hamish Keith (Wasps FC and Scotland)
- Andy Ripley (Rosslyn Park F.C., England, Lions and Barbarian F.C.)
- Chris Ralston (Rosslyn Park F.C., England and Lions)
- Arthur Gould (London Welsh RFC Richmond F.C. and Wales)
- Peter Kininmonth (Scotland)
- CEL "Curly" Hammond (for four successive years was captain of Harlequin F.C. and Middlesex and later captained England)
- Patrick C.R. Orr (Harlequin F.C. and Barbarian F.C.)
- Brian Stoneman (Richmond F.C. and Barbarian F.C.)
- Charles Webster Thorburn (Guy's Hospital RFC and Barbarian F.C.)
- Thomas Lawther (Old Millhillians) (Scotland)

== Affiliated clubs ==
There are currently 88 clubs affiliated with the Middlesex RFU, most of which have teams at both senior and junior level. All these clubs are based in Greater London – in what used to be the historic county of Middlesex, although a large number of clubs are also members of the Surrey RFU.

- Askeans
- Barnes (Note: Barnes are joint members of both the Middlesex RFU and Surrey RFU.)
- Barnet Elizabethans
- Battersea Ironsides (Note: Battersea Ironsides are joint members of both the Middlesex RFU and Surrey RFU.)
- Bec Old Boys (Note: Bec Old Boys are joint members of both the Middlesex RFU and Surrey RFU.)
- Bedfont Sports
- Belsize Park
- Birkbeck Phantoms
- Blackheath (Note: Blackheath are members of the Kent RFU, Middlesex RFU and Surrey RFU.)
- Bulldogs
- Chiswick
- Croydon (Note: Croydon are joint members of both the Middlesex RFU and Surrey RFU.)
- CS Rugby 1863
- Ealing Trailfinders (Note: Ealing Trailfinders are joint members of both the Middlesex RFU and Surrey RFU.)
- Effingham & Leatherhead (Note: Effingham & Leatherhead are joint members of both the Middlesex RFU and Surrey RFU.)
- Enfield Ignatians
- Epping Upper Clapton (Note: Epping Upper Clapton are members of both the Middlesex RFU and Essex RFU.)
- Feltham
- Feltham Phoenix
- Finchley
- Finsbury Park
- Footscray (Note: Footscray are members of both the Middlesex RFU and Kent RFU.)
- Grasshoppers
- Hackney
- Hammersmith & Fulham
- Hampstead
- Hanwell
- Haringey Rhinos
- Harlequin Amateurs
- Harlequin Ladies
- Harlequins
- Harrow
- Hayes
- Hendon
- Hillingdon Abbots
- Kilburn Cosmos
- London Cornish (Note: London Cornish are joint members of both the Cornwall RFU and Middlesex RFU.)
- London Exiles (Note: London Exiles are joint members of both the Middlesex RFU and Surrey RFU.)
- London Irish (Note: London Irish Wild Geese are joint members of both the Middlesex RFU and Surrey RFU.)
- London Irish Wild Geese (Note: London Irish Wild Geese are joint members of both the Middlesex RFU and Surrey RFU.)
- London New Zealand
- London Nigerian
- London Scottish Lions RFC
- London Scottish
- London Welsh Amateur (Note: London Welsh went into liquidation in January 2017. Amateur side still in existence.)
- Merton (Note: Merton are joint members of both the Middlesex RFU and Surrey RFU.)
- Mill Hill
- Millfield Old Boys
- Millwall (Note: Millwall are members of both the Middlesex RFU and Essex RFU.)
- Mitcham
- Northolt
- Old Actonians
- Old Alleynians (Note: Old Alleynians take part in competitions organized by the Surrey RFU.)
- Old Cliftonians
- Old Colfeians (Note: Old Colfeians are joint members of both the Kent RFU and Middlesex RFU.)
- Old Dunstonians
- Old Emanuel
- Old Grammarians
- Old Haberdashers
- Old Haileyburians (Note: Old Haileyburians are joint members of both the Middlesex RFU and Surrey RFU.)
- Old Hamptonians
- Old Isleworthians
- Old Millhillians
- Old Pauline (Note: Old Pauline are joint members of both the Middlesex RFU and Surrey RFU.)
- Old Priorians
- Old Streetonians
- Old Tiffinians (Note: Old Tiffinians are joint members of both the Middlesex RFU and Surrey RFU.)
- Old Tottonians
- Old Whitgiftian (Note: Old Whitgiftian are joint members of both the Middlesex RFU and Surrey RFU.)
- Old Wimbledonians (Note: Old Wimbledonians are joint members of both the Middlesex RFU and Surrey RFU.)
- Pinner & Grammarians
- Quintin
- Rosslyn Park (Note: Rosslyn Park are joint members of both the Middlesex RFU and Surrey RFU.)
- Ruislip
- Saracens
- Saracens Amateur
- Southgate
- Southwark Lancers (Note: Southwark Lancers are joint members of both the Kent RFU and Middlesex RFU.)
- Staines
- Streatham-Croydon (Note: Streatham-Croydon are joint members of both the Middlesex RFU and Surrey RFU.)
- Teddington (Note: Teddington are joint members of both the Middlesex RFU and Surrey RFU.)
- Thamesians
- Twickenham
- Uxbridge
- Warlingham (Note: Warlingham are joint members of both the Middlesex RFU and Surrey RFU.)
- Wasps Amateurs (Note: London Wasps moved to Coventry in 2014. Amateur side still based in London.)
- West London
- Whitton Lions
- Wimbledon (Note: Wimbledon are joint members of both the Middlesex RFU and Surrey RFU.)

== County club competitions ==
The Middlesex RFU currently helps run the following competitions for clubs based in the historic county of Middlesex (now part of London):

=== Leagues ===
- Herts/Middlesex 1 – (alongside Hertfordshire RFU) league at tier 9 of the English rugby union system
- Herts/Middlesex 2 – league at tier 10

=== Cups ===
- Middlesex Senior Cup – founded in 1971, currently open to clubs at tiers 6–7 of the English rugby union system
- Middlesex Bowl – founded in 2003, clubs at tiers 6–9
- Middlesex Vase – founded in 2002, clubs at tiers 9–10
- North West Floodlight Cup

=== Discontinued competitions ===
- Herts/Middlesex 3 – tier 11 league, discontinued in 2014
- Herts/Middlesex 4 – tier 12 league, discontinued in 2010
- Herts/Middlesex 5 – tier 13 league, discontinued in 1997
- Middlesex 1 – tier 8–10 league, discontinued in 1996
- Middlesex 2 – tier 9–11 league, discontinued in 1996
- Middlesex 3 – tier 10–12 league, discontinued in 1996
- Middlesex 4 – tier 11–13 league, discontinued in 1996
- Middlesex 5 – tier 12 league, discontinued in 1992

== See also ==
- London & SE Division
- English rugby union system

=== Within Wikipedia ===
- Middlesex County Cricket Club

=== Photos on the web ===
- Middlesex v 1905 New Zealand scrum
- Peter Kininmonth who scored a drop goal to propel Scotland to a famous win against Wales in 1951
- The Middlesex side that played Somerset on 28 December 1889 at Weston-super-Mare
- Middlesex v 1906/7 Sprinboks at Richmond (South Africa won 9–0)
