= Herts/Middlesex 3 =

English rugby union league

- Current season or competition: 2013–14 Herts/Middlesex 3
- Sport: Rugby union
- Instituted: 1996; 30 years ago
- Ceased: 2014; 12 years ago
- Number of teams: 7
- Country: England
- Holders: London French (2nd title) (2013–14) (promoted to Herts/Middlesex 2)
- Most titles: Wasps Amateurs, Feltham, London French (2 titles)
- Website: clubs.rfu.com

Herts/Middlesex 3 was a tier 11 English Rugby Union league that was organized by the London and South East Division Rugby Football Union. It was the third division competition for clubs in Hertfordshire and parts of north-west London that belonged to the historic county of Middlesex, with promoted teams moving up to Herts/Middlesex 2.

It involved a number of formats over the years, switching between a single division and regional (north/south) divisions and during certain years there was relegation to Herts/Middlesex 4 (when in existence). Herts/Middlesex 3 folded at the end of the 2013-14 season with most teams being promoted automatically to Herts/Middlesex 2.

== Participating Clubs 2013-14 ==
- Borehamwood
- Hatfield
- London French
- Mill Hill
- Old Grammarians
- Old Isleworthians
- Pinner & Grammarians
- Watford

== Participating Clubs 2012-13 ==
- Borehamwood
- Feltham
- Hatfield
- London French
- Mill Hill
- Old Ashmoleans
- Old Tottonians
- Sodam
- Thamesians
- Watford

== Participating Clubs 2009-10 ==
- Cuffley
- Hatfield
- London French
- Ickenham
- Old Tottonians
- Pinner & Grammarians - promoted from Middlesex/Herts 4 in 2009
- Thamesians
- Watford

== Original teams ==
When this division began in 1996 it contained the following teams:

- Antlers (Note: Currently known as Teddington RFC.) - transferred from Middlesex 2 (4th)
- Bank of England - transferred from Middlesex 2 (6th)
- Barclays Bank - transferred from Middlesex 2 (3rd)
- Old Abbots (Note: Currently known as Hillingdon Abbots RFC.) - transferred from Middlesex 2 (runners up)
- Hitchin - transferred from Hertfordshire 1 (5th)
- London Exiles - transferred from Middlesex 2 (7th)
- London French - transferred from Middlesex 2 (5th)
- London Nigerian - transferred from Middlesex 1 (runners up)
- Roxeth Manor Old Boys - transferred from Middlesex 1 (11th)
- Sudbury Court - transferred from Middlesex 1 (12th)
- UCS Old Boys - promoted from Middlesex 3 (champions)
- Watford - transferred from Hertfordshire 1 (4th)

== Herts/Middlesex 3 honours ==
Herts/Middlesex 3
Season	No of Teams	Champions	Runners–up	Relegated Teams	League Name
1996–97	12	London Nigerian (Note: Due to league restructuring champions London Nigerian would be promoted two levels up to Herts/Middlesex 1.)	UCS Old Boys (Note: Due to league restructuring all remaining eleven clubs were promoted into Herts/Middlesex 2 including runners up UCS Old Boys.)	No relegation (Note: League restructuring meant there was no relegation.)	Herts/Middlesex 3
1997–98	10	St. Nicholas Old Boys	Hammersmith & Fulham	Pinner & Grammarians	Herts/Middlesex 3
1998–99	13	Northolt	Southgate	Multiple teams (Note: Four teams were relegated including Royston, Watford II, Millfield Old Boys and British Airways. This was due to the restructuring of Herts/Middlesex 3 into two regional divisions.)	Herts/Middlesex 3 (Note: Herts/Middlesex 3 would split into two regional divisions - north and south - for the following season. This format would continue until 2008–09.)
1999–00	6	Cuffley	Old Streetonians	Royston	Herts/Middlesex 3 North
1999–00	6	London Exiles	Old Isleworthians	British Airways	Herts/Middlesex 3 South
2000–01	9	Kilburn Cosmos	Old Grammarians	Old Ashmoleans, Southgate, Old Streetonians	Herts/Middlesex 3 North
2000–01	9	Wasps Amateurs	Old Actonians	London Tribes, Quintin	Herts/Middlesex 3 South
2001–02	8	Chess Valley	Hendon	Watford II, Hatfield, Northolt	Herts/Middlesex 3 North
2001–02	8	Wasps Amateurs	Old Isleworthians	Wealdstone, Ickenham	Herts/Middlesex 3 South
2002–03	7	Old Grammarians	Old Haberdashers	No relegation (Note: No relegation as division would increase from 7 to 8 teams for the following season.)	Herts/Middlesex 3 North
2002–03	9	Harlequin Amateurs	Belsize Park	Northolt, Osterley	Herts/Middlesex 3 South
2003–04	8	Wealdstone	Cuffley	No relegation (Note: No relegation as Herts/Middlesex 4 North abolished for the following season.)	Herts/Middlesex 3 North
2003–04	7	Belsize Park	London French	No relegation (Note: No relegation as Herts/Middlesex 4 South abolished for the following season.)	Herts/Middlesex 3 South
2004–05	7	Old Ashmoleans	Hendon	No relegation	Herts/Middlesex 3 North
2004–05	7	Feltham	GWR	No relegation	Herts/Middlesex 3 South
2005–06	7	Saracens Amateurs	Watford II	No relegation	Herts/Middlesex 3 North
2005–06	8	British Airways	Old Isleworthians	No relegation	Herts/Middlesex 3 South
2006–07	8	Royston	Wasps Amateurs	No relegation	Herts/Middlesex 3 North
2006–07	9	Thamesians	H.A.C.	No relegation	Herts/Middlesex 3 South
2007–08	7	Hackney (Note: Due to league restructuring Hackney would not be promoted but would remain in the new look, single division Herts/Middlesex 3 for the next season.)	Cuffley (Note: As with Hackney, Cuffley would remain in the new look, single division Herts/Middlesex 3 for the next season.)	Multiple teams (Note: Four teams would be relegated from Middlesex 3 North into the new single division Herts/Middlesex 4 for the following season; Chess Valley, Southgate, Hatfield and Pinner & Grammarians.)	Herts/Middlesex 3 North
2007–08	7	London French (Note: Due to league restructuring London French would not be promoted but would remain in the new look, single division Herts/Middlesex 3 for the next season.)	Quintin (Note: As with London French, Quintin would remain in the new look, single division Herts/Middlesex 3 for the next season.)	Multiple teams (Note: Five teams would be relegated from Middlesex 3 South into the new single division Herts/Middlesex 4 for the following season; Hayes, GWR, Northolt, British Airways and Sudbury & London Springboks.)	Herts/Middlesex 3 South
2008–09	8	Old Isleworthians	Hackney	Watford, Old Tottonians, Cuffley	Herts/Middlesex 3
2009–10	8	Ickenham	London French	Cuffley, Watford, Hatfield	Herts/Middlesex 3
2010–11	9	Harrow	Hillingdon Abbots	No relegation (Note: No relegation as Herts/Middlesex 4 abolished for the next season.)	Herts/Middlesex 3
2011–12	9	Quintin	Chess Valley	No relegation	Herts/Middlesex 3
2012–13	8	Feltham	Thamesians	No relegation	Herts/Middlesex 3
2013–14	7	London French	Watford (Note: As this was the last season of Herts/Middlesex 3 most teams in the division would be automatically promoted to Herts/Middlesex 2 although Pinner & Grammarians and Old Grammarians would leave the league to join Middlesex Merit Table 5 and 6 respectively.)	No relegation	Herts/Middlesex 3
Green backgrounds are promotion places.

== Promotion play-offs ==
From 2000 to 2003 there was a playoff between the runners-up of Herts/Middlesex 3 North and Herts/Middlesex 3 South for the third and final promotion place to Herts/Middlesex 2 with the team with the superior league record has home advantage in the tie. The promotion playoffs were discontinued for the 2003-04 season when Herts/Middlesex 2 split into two divisions (north and south), meaning that the top two sides in Herts/Middlesex 3 North and Herts/Middlesex 3 South automatically went up instead. At the end of the 2003-04 season the Herts/Middlesex 3 South teams had been the most successful with two wins to the Herts/Middlesex 3 North teams one; and the away team had won promotion two times to the home team's one.

Herts/Middlesex 3 North v Herts/Middlesex 3 South promotion play-off results
Season	Home team	Score	Away team	Venue	Attendance
2000-01	Hammersmith & Fulham (S) (Note: Despite finishing 3rd in the league Hammersmith & Fulham qualified for the 2000-01 promotion playoff as champions Wasps Amateurs were denied promotion. This meant that 2nd placed Old Actonians went up instead with Hammersmith & Fulham going into the playoff which was usually reserved for the league runners up.)	58-0	Old Grammarians (N)	Hurlingham Park, Fulham, London	
2001-02	Hendon (N)	5-22	Old Isleworthians (S)	Copthall Playing Fields, Hendon, London	
2002-03	Belsize Park (S)	8-12	Old Haberdashers (N)	Regent's Park, Central London, London	
Green background is the promoted team. N = Herts/Middlesex 3 North and S = Herts/Middlesex 3 South

== Number of league titles ==
- Feltham (2) (Note: One of Feltham's titles was for Herts/Middlesex 3 South.)
- London French (2) (Note: One of London French's titles was for Herts/Middlesex 3 South.)
- Wasps Amateurs (2) (Note: Both of Wasps Amateurs titles were for Herts/Middlesex 3 South.)
- Belsize Park (Note: Belsize Park's title was for Herts/Middlesex 3 South.)
- British Airways (Note: British Airways title was for Herts/Middlesex 3 South.)
- Chess Valley (Note: Chess Valley's title was for Herts/Middlesex 3 North.)
- Cuffley (1) (Note: Cuffley's title was for Herts/Middlesex 3 North.)
- Hackney (1) (Note: Hackney's title was for Herts/Middlesex 3 North.)
- Harlequin Amateurs (1) (Note: Harlequin Amateurs title was for Herts/Middlesex 3 South.)
- Harrow (1)
- Ickenham (1)
- Kilburn Cosmos (1) (Note: Kilburn Cosmos title was for Herts/Middlesex 3 North.)
- London Exiles (1) (Note: London Exiles title was for Herts/Middlesex 3 South.)
- London Nigerian (1)
- Northolt (1)
- Old Ashmoleans (1) (Note: Old Ashmoleans title was for Herts/Middlesex 3 North.)
- Old Grammarians (1) (Note: Old Grammarians title was for Herts/Middlesex 3 North.)
- Old Isleworthians (1)
- Quintin (1)
- Royston (1) (Note: Royston's title was for Herts/Middlesex 3 North.)
- Saracens Amateurs (1) (Note: Saracens Amateurs title was for Herts/Middlesex 3 North.)
- St. Nicholas Old Boys (1)
- Thamesians (1) (Note: Thamesians title was for Herts/Middlesex 3 South.)
- Wealdstone (1) (Note: Wealdstone's title was for Herts/Middlesex 3 North.)

== See also ==
- London & SE Division RFU
- Hertfordshire RFU
- Middlesex RFU
- English rugby union system
- Rugby union in England
