= Albert Agar =

English rugby union player

- Full name: Albert Eustace Agar
- Born: 12 November 1923 Hartlepool, England
- Died: 4 June 2001 (aged 77) Bromley, England
- School: West Hartlepool Grammar
- Occupation: Bank clerk

Rugby union career
- Position: Centre
International career
Years	Team	Apps	(Points)
1952–53	England	7	(6)

Albert Eustace Agar (12 November 1923 – 4 June 2001) was an English international rugby union player and administrator, who represented England seven times before holding senior positions within the Rugby Football Union and international rugby.

Agar was born in Hartlepool and educated at West Hartlepool Grammar School. During World War Two, he was an RAF navigator and later moved to London where he eventually became Treasurer of Lloyds Bank.

A centre, Agar played his rugby for Hartlepool Rovers, Durham City, Lloyds Bank, Harlequins, Middlesex and London Counties, while winning seven England caps. He made his England debut against the Springboks at Twickenham in 1952 and featured twice in their successful 1953 Five Nation campaign. His playing career was eventually curtailed by knee and shoulder injuries.

Following his retirement as a player, Agar became increasingly involved in rugby administration. He became an England selector in 1962, and served as chairman of selectors in the 1969–70 and 1970–71 seasons, a period that coincided with significant changes in the organisation and coaching of the national team when Don White became England's first coach in 1969. He was secretary of the Four Home Unions Tours Committee, encompassing the 1971 and 1974 British & Irish Lions tours. In 1978, he replaced Dickie Jeeps as England representative on the International Rugby Football Board and Four Home Unions Committee.

Agar subsequently held a number of senior positions within the game. He was president of the Middlesex Rugby Football Union from 1979 to 1982 and then Rugby Football Union president from 1984 to 1985, winning approval for divisional competition and restructuring of the County Championship. In 1985, he represented England with John Kendall-Carpenter at the International Board when the Rugby World Cup proposal was considered and approved. He later rejoined the International Board as an English representative in July 1990 in advance of the 1991 Rugby World Cup.

== See also ==
- List of England national rugby union players
