= Hertfordshire 1 =

English rugby union league

- Sport: Rugby union
- Instituted: 1987; 39 years ago
- Ceased: 1996; 30 years ago
- Number of teams: 11
- Country: England
- Holders: Harpenden (1st title) (1995–96) (promoted to Herts/Middlesex 1)

Hertfordshire 1 was an English level 10 Rugby Union league with teams from Hertfordshire and parts of north London taking part. Promoted teams used to move up to Herts/Middlesex 1 and relegation was to Hertfordshire 2 until that division was cancelled at the end of the 1989–90 season. The division was cancelled in at the end of the 1995–96 campaign after nine seasons due to the merger of the Hertfordshire and Middlesex regional leagues.

== Original teams ==
When league rugby began in 1987 this division contained the following teams:

- Barnet (Note: Barnet would merge with Old Elizabethans in 1997 to form Barnet Elizabethans RFC.)
- Harpenden
- Hemel Hempstead
- Old Elizabethans (Note: Old Elizabethans would merge with Barnet in 1997 to form Barnet Elizabethans RFC.)
- Stevenage Town
- Tring
- Verulamians
- Welwyn

== Hertfordshire 1 honours ==
=== Hertfordshire 1 (1987–1992) ===
The original Hertfordshire 1 was a tier 8 league with promotion up to London 3 North West and relegation down to Hertfordshire 2 until that league was cancelled at the end of the 1989–90 season.

Hertfordshire 1
| Season | No of Teams | Champions | Runners–up | Relegated Teams |
| 1987–88 | 9 | Hemel Hempstead | Old Elizabethans | Tring |
| 1988–89 | 8 | Welwyn | Barnet | Royston, Old Ashmoleans |
| 1989–90 | 8 | Letchworth Garden City | Old Elizabethans | No relegation (Note: There was no relegation due to the cancellation of Hertfordshire 2 at the end of the season.) |
| 1990–91 | 13 | Verulamians | Harpenden | No relegation |
| 1991–92 | 11 | Old Elizabethans | Harpenden (Note: The creation of Herts/Middlesex for the following season, meant that 3rd place Stevenage Town and 4th place Hitchin were promoted into this new division. Runners up Harpenden joined champions Old Elizabethans in London 3 North West.) | No relegation |
Green backgrounds are promotion places.

=== Hertfordshire 1 (1992–1996) ===
The creation of Herts/Middlesex at the beginning of the 1992–93 season meant that Hertfordshire 1 dropped to become a tier 9 league. The introduction of National 5 South for the 1993–94 season meant that Hertfordshire 1 dropped another level to become a tier 10 league for the years that National 5 South was active. Promotion was into the new Herts/Middlesex league and. as this was the lowest tier league for Hertfordshire based clubs, there was no relegation. The merging of the Hertfordshire and Middlesex regional divisions at the end of the 1996–97 mean that Hertfordshire 1 was cancelled.

Hertfordshire 1
| Season | No of Teams | Champions | Runners–up | Relegated Teams |
| 1992–93 | 11 | Barnet | Tring | No relegation |
| 1993–94 | 11 | St Albans | Datchworth | No relegation |
| 1994–95 | 10 | Tring | Stevenage Town | No relegation |
| 1995–96 | 11 | Harpenden (Note: Champions Harpenden would be promoted into the renamed Herts/Middlesex 1.) | Stevenage Town (Note: The merging of the Herts/Middlesex regional divisions meant that runners up Stevenage Town and 3rd place Datchford were transferred into the new Herts/Middlesex 2.) | No relegation (Note: Although there would be no relegation, all remaining teams would be transferred into the new Herts/Middlesex leagues - Watford and Hitchen would join Herts/Middlesex 3; Old Standfordians, Royston and Old Ashmoleans would join Herts/Middlesex 4; Cuffley, Queen Elizabeth II Hospital and Hatfield would join Herts/Middlesex 5 North.) |
Green backgrounds are promotion places.

== Number of league titles ==
- Barnet (1) (Note: Currently known as Barnet Elizabethans RFC.)
- Hemel Hempstead (1)
- Letchworth Garden City (1)
- Old Elizabethans (1) (Note: Currently known as Barnet Elizabethans RFC.)
- St Albans (1)
- Tring
- Verulamians (1)
- Welwyn (1)

== See also ==
- London & SE Division RFU
- Hertfordshire RFU
- English rugby union system
- Rugby union in England
