= Thomas Lawther =

Scotland international rugby union player

- Born: Thomas Hope Brendan Lawther; 6 October 1909 Rothesay, Scotland
- Died: 12 December 1994 (aged 85) Fulham, England
- Height: 1.78 m (5 ft 10 in)
- Weight: 85 kg (13 st 5 lb; 187 lb)

Rugby union career
- Position: Full Back
Amateur team(s)
Years	Team	Apps	(Points)
- Old Millhillians
–	Royal School of Mines		
Provincial / State sides
Years	Team	Apps	(Points)
1929-	Middlesex		
International career
Years	Team	Apps	(Points)
1932	Scotland	2	(0)

Thomas Lawther (6 October 1909 – 12 December 1994) was a Scotland international rugby union player.

== Rugby Union career ==
=== Amateur career ===
Lawther went to Mill Hill School in London and captained their school XV side. He then played rugby union for Old Millhillians.

On his selection for Scotland, the Dundee Courier of 12 January 1932 reported:

Mr W. D. Gibbs, the hon. secretary Old Millhillians R.F.C., yesterday told a Courier and Advertiser representative: "The selection of Lawther is not really a surprise. In fact, he played well enough to have been chosen last season. The only surprising thing is that the Scottish Selection Committee should have departed from their usual policy in calling upon a man who, playing in London, does not turn out for London Scottish. Lawther a first-rate full-back, a very good cricketer and hockey player."

He played rugby union for the Royal School of Mines in the midweek.

=== Provincial career ===
He was capped by Middlesex, since 1929.

=== International career ===
He was capped twice for Scotland in 1932.

Lawther's selection at Full Back for the match against South Africa came as a huge shock to those in Scotland.

The choice of Lawther, who is almost unknown in Scotland, will come as big surprise to rugby enthusiasts all over the country.

He was however a reserve for Scotland in 1931, but he did not play in the 1931–32 season trials.

The conditions of the South Africa match were not great and Lawther did not fare well. This was reported by the Dundee Evening Telegraph of 20 January 1932:

T. H. B. Lawther did not present himself as being very much superior to any of our home backs. was slow in gathering up the ball, and on Saturday his touch finding was none too sure. is to be given another chance against Wales, and it is to be hoped that he will on this occasion justify his selection.

His re-selection for the Wales match then caused another stir.

The Dundee Courier of 21 January 1932:

STRANGE ARE THE WAYS OF RUGBY CHIEFS Well, the Scottish selectors have done it again. Quite unchastened by their recent experiences, they now propose to even bigger risks then they did by their sensational choice of T. B. Lawther as full-back. There is something to be said for their decision to give Lawther another chance. No full-back could fairly be judged in conditions like those Saturday, and Lawther was fortunate enough to avoid making serious slips. isn't altogether surprising that some people still regard him as a 'comer'.

== Other sports ==
He was noted as a 'good cricketer'.

The Dundee Courier of 12 January 1932 reported:

He captained Mill Hills cricket eleven in 1928, in which season, scoring 508 runs, he had batting average of nearly 34, and took 51 wickets a cost of little over 18 runs apiece. He was also the side of the two previous years.

He stroked the Cambridge boat race crew in 1932.

== Business career ==
Like his father Lawther became a mining engineer. He was employed at the Royal School of Mines.

== Family ==
He was born to Thomas Dodd Lawther (1872-1846), a mining engineer, and Charlotte Rosa Maskrey (1871-1922). They had two sons, Ian and Thomas, and both followed in their father's footsteps of career.

Thomas Lawther married Mary Joyce Busby (1910-1997) in 1932.

They had a daughter in 1938.
