= London and South East Division Rugby Football Union =

Rugby union governing body

The London and South East Division Rugby Football Union is a rugby union governing body for London and South East England and is part of the Rugby Football Union.

== Notable players ==
- (Scotland) Peter Douty

== Constituent Bodies ==
- Eastern Counties
- Essex
- Hampshire
- Hertfordshire
- Kent
- Middlesex
- Surrey
- Sussex

== Leagues ==
It organises the following leagues:

- London & South East Premier (tier 5)
- London 1 North (6)
- London 1 South (6)
- London 2 North East (7)
- London 2 North West (7)
- London 2 South East (7)
- London 2 South West (7)
- London 3 Eastern Counties (8)
- London 3 Essex (8)
- London 3 North West (8)
- London 3 South East (8)
- London 3 South West (8)
- Eastern Counties 1 (9)
- Eastern Counties 2 (10)
- Essex 1 (9)
- Hampshire Premier (9)
- Hampshire 1 (10)
- Hampshire 2 (11)
- Herts/Middlesex 1 (9)
- Herts/Middlesex 2 (10)
- Kent 1 (9)
- Kent 2 (10)
- Surrey 1 (9)
- Surrey 2 (10)
- Surrey 3 (11)
- Surrey 4 (12)
- Sussex 1 (9)

== Cups ==
Clubs also take part in the following national cup competitions:

- RFU Intermediate Cup
- RFU Senior Vase
- RFU Junior Vase

== Discontinued competitions ==
- Eastern Counties 4
- Eastern Counties 5
- Eastern Counties 6
- Essex 2
- Essex 3
- Herts/Middlesex 3
- Herts/Middlesex 4
- Herts/Middlesex 5
- Hertfordshire 1
- Hertfordshire 2
- Middlesex 1
- Middlesex 2
- Middlesex 3
- Middlesex 4
- Middlesex 5
- Surrey 5
- Sussex 2
- Sussex 3

== See also ==
- Midland Division
- Northern Division
- South West Division
- English rugby union system
