= Hertfordshire 2 =

English rugby union league

Hertfordshire 1
- Sport: Rugby union
- Instituted: 1987; 39 years ago
- Ceased: 1990; 36 years ago
- Number of teams: 5
- Country: England
- Holders: Royston (1st title) (1989–90) (promoted to Hertfordshire 1)

Hertfordshire 2 was an English level 9 Rugby Union league with teams from Hertfordshire and parts of north London taking part. Promoted teams used to move up to Hertfordshire 1 and, as it was the lowest level league in the region, there was no relegation. After just three seasons the league was cancelled at the end of the 1989–90 campaign.

== Original teams ==
When league rugby began in 1987 this division contained the following teams:

- Datchworth
- East Hertfordshire
- Hitchin
- Old Ashmoleans
- Royston
- St Albans
- Watford

== Hertfordshire 2 honours ==
Hertfordshire 2
Season	No of Teams	Champions	Runners–up	Relegated Teams
1987–88	7	Old Ashmoleans	Royston	No relegation
1988–89	6	Hitchin	Tring	No relegation
1989–90	5	Royston	Datchworth (Note: Due to the cancellation of Hertfordshire 2 at the end of the season all five clubs in the division were promoted to Hertfordshire 1.)	No relegation
Green backgrounds are promotion places.

== Number of league titles ==
- Hitchin (1)
- Old Ashmoleans (1)
- Royston (1)

== See also ==
- London & SE Division RFU
- Hertfordshire RFU
- English rugby union system
- Rugby union in England
