= Middlesex Sevens =

Rugby sevens tournament

The Middlesex Sevens was a Rugby Sevens tournament held annually at Twickenham stadium in London, England until 2011. It was first held in 1926, and started by Dr J.A. Russell-Cargill, a London-based Scot. The event was held at the end of the rugby union season in May every year for 75 years, but moved to August in 2001 due to lack of available stadium dates and players in May. The Middlesex Sevens tournament was last played in 2011, as the new Premiership Rugby 7s Series caused many of the top clubs that previously took part to pull out.

This tournament was a charitable event, officially called the Middlesex Charity Sevens, with the beneficiaries being Wooden Spoon and the RFU Injured Players Fund. Middlesex Charity Sevens raised over £10 million for charities.

== History ==
Traditionally the Middlesex Sevens was an invitation tournament with entertainment derived from overseas and qualifying sides challenging rugby union's top teams. In 2005 the tournament became a twelve team competition with only Rugby Premiership teams participating. In 2008 the tournament reverted to sixteen teams. Brazil was amongst the teams invited to take part in the 2011 tournament. The final was played between Esher RFC and Samurai.

Two rugby league clubs have won the Middlesex Sevens. In 1996 Wigan brought a star-studded team including Martin Offiah, Shaun Edwards, Andy Farrell, Va'aiga Tuigamala and Jason Robinson to Twickenham. Bradford Bulls were champions in 2002.

The Women's Middlesex 7s was introduced in 2011, the final year of the tournament, and was won by Wooden Spoon Women.

== List of winners ==
- 1926 Harlequins
- 1927 Harlequins
- 1928 Harlequins
- 1929 Harlequins
- 1930 London Welsh
- 1931 London Welsh
- 1932 Blackheath
- 1933 Harlequins
- 1934 Barbarians
- 1935 Harlequins
- 1936 Sale
- 1937 London Scottish
- 1938 Metropolitan Police
- 1939 Cardiff
- 1940 St Mary's Hospital
- 1941 Cambridge University
- 1942 St Mary's Hospital
- 1943 St Mary's Hospital
- 1944 St Mary's Hospital
- 1945 Nottingham
- 1946 St Mary's Hospital
- 1947 Rosslyn Park
- 1948 London Wasps
- 1949 Heriot's FP
- 1950 Rosslyn Park
- 1951 Richmond
- 1952 London Wasps
- 1953 Richmond
- 1954 Rosslyn Park
- 1955 Richmond
- 1956 London Welsh
- 1957 St. Luke's College, Exeter
- 1958 Blackheath
- 1959 Loughborough Colleges
- 1960 London Scottish
- 1961 London Scottish
- 1962 London Scottish
- 1963 London Scottish
- 1964 Loughborough Colleges
- 1965 London Scottish
- 1966 Loughborough Colleges
- 1967 Harlequins
- 1968 London Welsh
- 1969 St. Luke's College, Exeter
- 1970 Loughborough Colleges
- 1971 London Welsh
- 1972 London Welsh
- 1973 London Welsh
- 1974 Richmond
- 1975 Richmond
- 1976 Loughborough Colleges
- 1977 Richmond
- 1978 Harlequins
- 1979 Richmond
- 1980 Richmond
- 1981 Rosslyn Park
- 1982 Stewart's Melville FP
- 1983 Richmond
- 1984 London Welsh
- 1985 London Wasps
- 1986 Harlequins
- 1987 Harlequins
- 1988 Harlequins
- 1989 Harlequins
- 1990 Harlequins
- 1991 London Scottish
- 1992 Western Samoa
- 1993 London Wasps
- 1994 Bath
- 1995 Leicester Tigers
- 1996 Wigan (RL)
- 1997 Barbarians
- 1998 Barbarians
- 1999 Penguins
- 2000 Penguins
- 2001 British Army
- 2002 Bradford Bulls (RL)
- 2003 Northampton Saints
- 2004 British Army
- 2005 Gloucester
- 2006 London Wasps
- 2007 Newcastle Falcons
- 2008 Harlequins
- 2009 London Irish
- 2010 ULR Samurai
- 2011 Samurai International

== By wins ==
| Team | Titles | Years of Titles Won |
|---|---|---|
| Harlequins | 14 | 1926, 1927, 1928, 1929, 1933, 1935, 1967, 1978, 1986, 1987, 1988, 1989, 1990, 2008 |
| Richmond | 9 | 1951, 1953, 1955, 1974, 1975, 1977, 1979, 1980, 1983 |
| London Welsh | 8 | 1930, 1931, 1956, 1968, 1971, 1972, 1973, 1984 |
| London Scottish | 7 | 1937, 1960, 1961, 1962, 1963, 1965, 1991 |
| London Wasps | 5 | 1948, 1952, 1985, 1993, 2006 |
| Loughborough Colleges | 5 | 1959, 1964, 1966, 1970, 1976 |
| St. Mary's Hospital | 5 | 1940, 1942, 1943, 1944, 1946 |
| Rosslyn Park | 4 | 1947, 1950, 1954, 1981 |
| Barbarians | 3 | 1934, 1997, 1998 |
| Blackheath | 2 | 1932, 1958 |
| British Army | 2 | 2001, 2004 |
| Penguins | 2 | 1999, 2000 |
| ULR Samurai | 2 | 2010, 2011 |
| St Luke's College | 2 | 1957, 1969 |
| Bath | 1 | 1994 |
| Bradford Bulls (RL) | 1 | 2002 |
| Cambridge University | 1 | 1941 |
| Cardiff | 1 | 1939 |
| Gloucester | 1 | 2005 |
| Heriot's FP | 1 | 1949 |
| Leicester Tigers | 1 | 1995 |
| London Irish | 1 | 2009 |
| Metropolitan Police | 1 | 1938 |
| Newcastle Falcons | 1 | 2007 |
| Northampton Saints | 1 | 2003 |
| Nottingham | 1 | 1945 |
| Sale | 1 | 1936 |
| Stewart's Melville FP | 1 | 1982 |
| Western Samoa | 1 | 1992 |
| Wigan (RL) | 1 | 1996 |

== See also ==
- Rugby Sevens

== Bibliography ==
- Bath, Richard (editor) The Scotland Rugby Miscellany (Vision Sports Publishing, 2007 ISBN 1-905326-24-6)
