= Haringey Rhinos RFC =

English rugby club

(England) Haringey Rhinos RFC
- Union: Middlesex RFU
- Nickname: The Rhinos
- Founded: 1963
- Location: Wood Green, Haringey, London, England
- Ground: New River Stadium (Capacity: 5,000)
- League: Middlesex Merit 3
Team kit

Official website
- www.haringeyrhinos.co.uk

Haringey Rhinos Rugby Football Club is a rugby club based in the London Borough of Haringey, North London, England.

The Rhinos are one of only two rugby union clubs in Haringey and have approximately 380 members including players, former players, vice presidents, volunteers, coaches and youth players. The Rhinos have two senior men's teams, the first XV currently play in Middlesex Merit 3 having dropped out of Herts/Middlesex 2 of the London & SE Division league at the end of the 2018–19 season.

The Rhinos hold England Rugby Whole Club accreditation and the Sport England Clubmark. They are also a Saracens Partner club and work closely with England Rugby, local schools, and other community organizations to develop rugby union in Haringey.

== Formation ==
The Rhinos were established in 1963 as the Hornsey Hornets, becoming Haringey RFC in 1965 and moving to White Hart Lane in 1976. In 1990, The Rhinos opened the clubhouse at White Hart Lane. The club has produced players who have played at county, national and international levels, including a current player who represents Hungary U18s and two players who represent England at tag rugby.

== Youth Programme ==
The Rhinos have a growing youth section and by the end of the season in April 2014, had around 120 children and young people (boys and girls) playing rugby every Sunday. Participants broadly match the borough averages in terms of economic disadvantage and ethnicity, with 63% of the children and young people coming from ethnic minorities.

== Club Honours ==
- Middlesex 3 North champions: 1987–88
- Middlesex 2 champions: 1990–91
- Herts/Middlesex 2 champions: 2001–02
- Herts/Middlesex 1 champions: 2002–03
