= Ian Jones (rugby union, born 1940) =

- Full name: Ian Conin Jones
- Born: 2 March 1940 Vryburg, South Africa
- Died: 1 June 2015 (aged 75) Oxford, England
- Height: 6 ft 4 in (193 cm)
- University: University of Oxford
- Occupation: Merchant banker

Rugby union career
- Position: Lock
International career
Years	Team	Apps	(Points)
1968	Wales	1	(0)

Ian Conin Jones (2 March 1940 — 1 June 2015) was a Welsh international rugby union player.

Born in Vryburg, South Africa, Jones was raised in the farming community of Malmesbury and came to England on a Rhodes Scholarship, following studies at Stellenbosch University. He attended Queen's College, Oxford, and won three rugby blues, one in their victorious 1964 Varsity match.

Jones, a second row, played rugby for London Welsh and won a County Championship with Middlesex in 1967/68. He qualified to represent Wales through his grandparents and was capped in the 1968 Five Nations, with the selectors looking for an improved line-out presence against Ireland at Lansdowne Road, a match lost to a last-minute try to Mick Doyle.

== See also ==
- List of Wales national rugby union players
