= Barn Elms =

Open space in Richmond upon Thames, London

Coordinates: 51°28′25″N 0°13′51″W

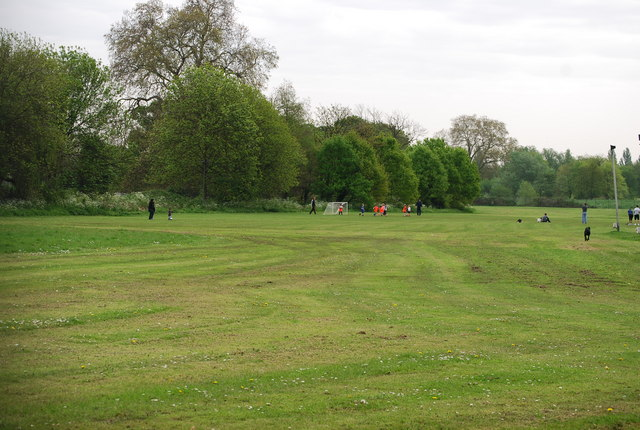
Part of the recreation grounds in 2008

Barn Elms is an open space in Barnes in the London Borough of Richmond upon Thames, located on the northerly loop of the River Thames between Barnes and Fulham.

The WWT London Wetland Centre (105 acres of what were once reservoirs) lies to the north of the open space, now largely given over to sporting venues. The site is split in two: the Barn Elms Sports Trust (BEST) fields, formerly managed as the Barn Elms Sports Centre by the London Borough of Richmond upon Thames, and the Barn Elms Sports Centre.

== Barn Elms Sports Trust ==
There are facilities for much amateur sport, such as football, rugby, tennis, softball and cricket, and an athletics track (home to London Athletic Club). It is also the home ground for Barnes RFC, Barnes FC, Barnes Eagles FC, Stonewall FC, London French RFC. and London Exiles RFC. The facilities were under threat of commercial development until the local community petitioned Richmond Council. To ensure the future of Barn Elms as playing fields the community has created the Barn Elms Sports Trust.

== Barn Elms Sports Centre ==
Barn Elms Sports Centre is a 52 acre, multi-sports facility, with a multi-station gym, 4 beach volleyball courts, 16 tennis courts, artificial hockey playing surfaces and a range of grass sports pitches. It is also the home ground for the semi-professional Barnes RFC.

== History ==
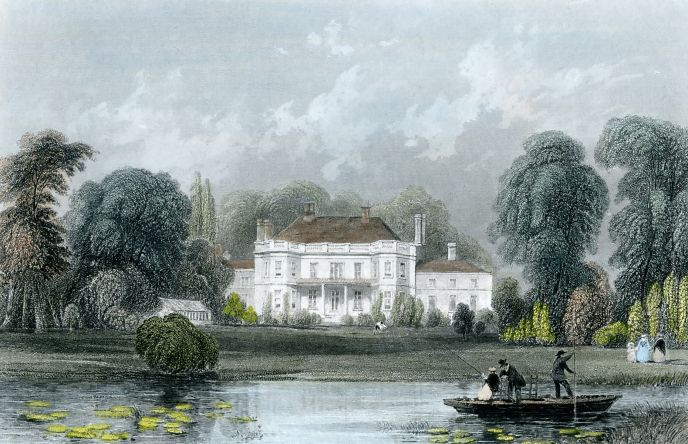
Barn Elms manor house in the Victorian era

Its name is derived from the Georgian house and parkland, the original manor house of Barnes, which stood on the site, until it was burnt out and demolished in 1954. In earlier times the manor house of Barnes was in the ownership of the Archbishop of Canterbury and then of the Dean and Chapter of St Paul's Cathedral. The Georgian house replaced the earlier one occupied by Sir Francis Walsingham, "Elizabeth's Spymaster". Queen Elizabeth I would visit Barn Elms to see her Spymaster. Barn Elms features in English literary history from the time the royalist poet Abraham Cowley moved to the house belonging to John Cartwright in 1663.

In the 1660s Barn Elms became a fashionable destination for boating picnics. Samuel Pepys, who arranged many a Sunday afternoon or moonlit evening boating party to Barn Elms himself, recorded that on 26 May 1667:

I walked the length of the Elmes, and with great pleasure saw some gallant ladies and people come with their bottles, and basket, and chairs, and form, (Note: A trestle table.) to sup under the trees, by the water-side, which was mighty pleasant.

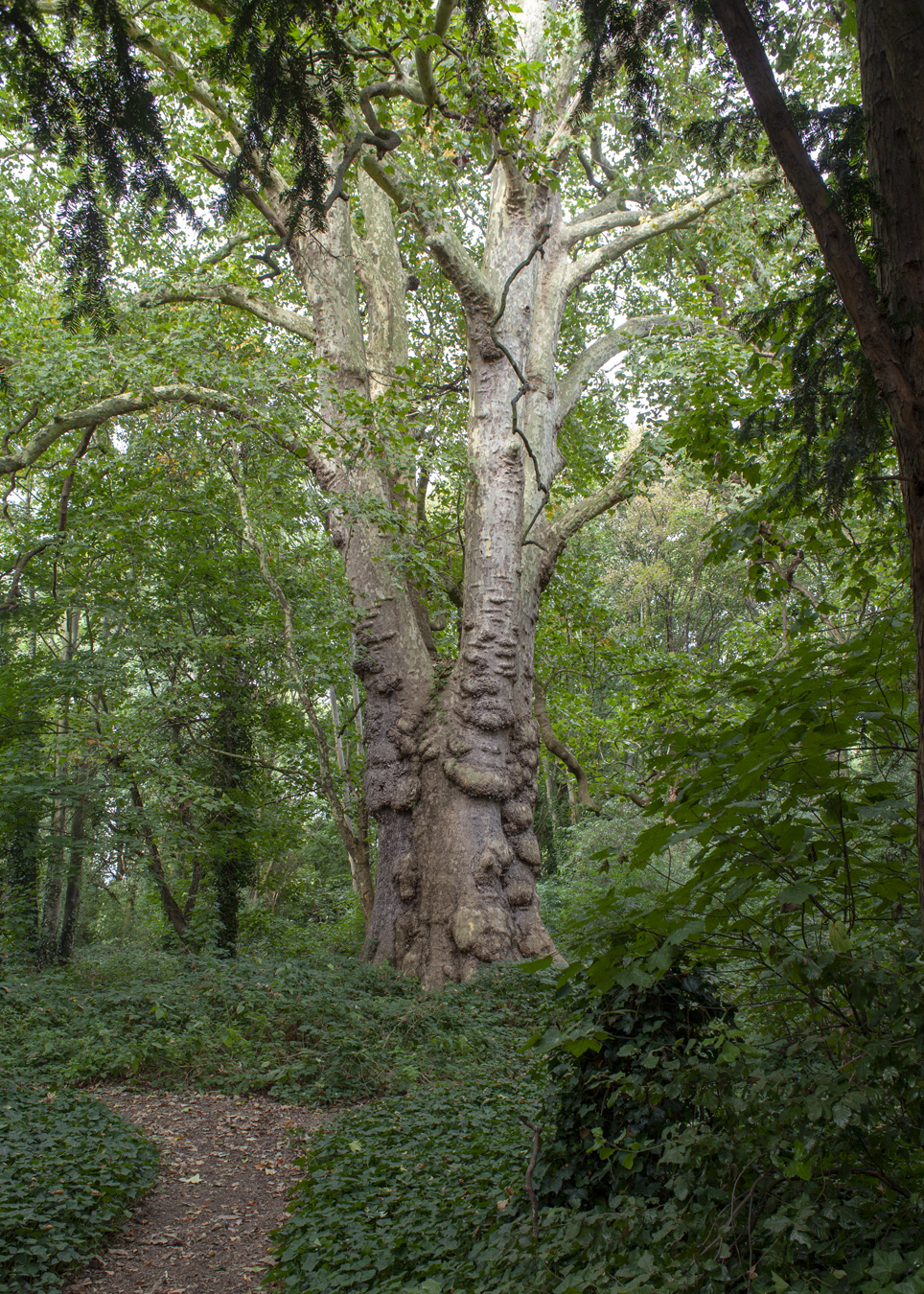
The Barn Elms London plane tree known as "Barney", one of the Great Trees of London and one of the oldest examples of the species in London

The oldest, and one of the largest London plane trees is in Barn Elms.

When Barn Elms was in the possession of the bookseller Jacob Tonson, the Kit-Cat Club met at Barn Elms for many years. Here the "Kit-Kat portraits" hung; Tonson's extensions to the house, c1703, seem to have been made under the general advice of John Vanbrugh, a Kit-Kat member.

John James Heidegger, the opera impresario, resided at Barn Elms, where he entertained George II, and as Heidegger's guest Georg Friederich Handel stayed here at his first arrival in England, in 1711.

The house was later remodelled or rebuilt for Sir Richard Hoare, who died at Barn Elms, and enlarged in the early 19th century by his son, Richard Colt Hoare. When Hammersmith Bridge was erected in 1824–27, the company that undertook the work bought Barn Elms and drove the access road, Upper Bridge Road, now Castelnau, across the park. The house was also the home of Sir Lancelot Shadwell, who was Vice Chancellor of England in the 19th century: on one occasion he delivered an injunction while up to his neck in the cool lake. From 1883 to 1939 Barn Elms was used as the club-house of the Ranelagh Club.

In 1891 Barn Elms for a short time played host to Queens Park Rangers. The club was forced to move there after it became impossible to play soccer at their home ground in Brondesbury which was shared with London Scottish rugby club. The house became derelict and was demolished following a fire in 1954.
