= Chris Ralston =

British Lions & England international rugby union player

Christopher Wayne Ralston (born 25 May 1944 (age 81)) is a former England international rugby union player. He represented the British and Irish Lions on their 1974 tour to South Africa and at the time played club rugby for Richmond F.C.
