= Northolt RFC =

(England) Northolt RFC
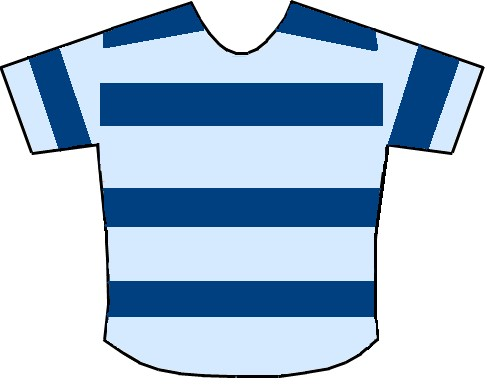
- Full name: Northolt Rugby Football Club
- Union: Middlesex RFU
- Founded: 1958; 68 years ago (as CAV RFC)
- Location: Greenford, London
- Ground: Cayton Park (Capacity: 650 (all standing))
- Chairman: (England) Geoff Payne
- Coach: (England) John Carpenter
- Captain: (Republic of Ireland) Dylan Flanagan
- League: Middlesex Merit Table 4

Official website
- www.pitchero.com/clubs/northolt

Northolt Rugby Football Club (or Northolt RFC) (formerly CAV RFC) are an English Rugby union club, based at Cayton Park, Greenford in West London, that compete in Middlesex Merit Table 4. The club was founded in the 1950s and originally played at the Polish War Memorial in Ruislip near to RAF Northolt aerodrome. The club currently comprises a 1st XV.

== Club history ==
Northolt Rugby Club formed in 1958 near The Polish War Memorial, where the Acton-based engineering company Lucas CAV had some of the best-conditioned sports grounds in West London. CAV RFC ran for 30 years until Lucas CAV moved to Haddenham, in Buckinghamshire.

As the CAV grounds were technically inside Northolt, the rugby club changed its name to Northolt RFC in 1988, and moved temporarily to Lord Halsbury playing fields, just behind Northolt station. Unfortunately the planned stay only lasted one season, as the promised changing rooms and pitches never arrived, but a quick last minute switch to the Kensington & Chelsea Playing Fields, in the heart of Northolt saved the club. Northolt RFC stayed there for 6 years until the grounds were closed down, at which point the club was relocated to its present location in Cayton Green Park, Cayton Road, Greenford.

Northolt RFC hold a 60-year lease on the sports grounds at Cayton Green Park, in Cayton Road, Greenford, which it uses along with various other local sports clubs who are associate members of Northolt RFC.

Early in 2006, and with a great deal of help and encouragement from the RFU, from Middlesex County RFU, from Active Ealing (local authority) and from the local education authorities, NRFC established mini rugby. This has quickly developed into mini and youth rugby, and the club now hosts an annual tag tournament for local schools.

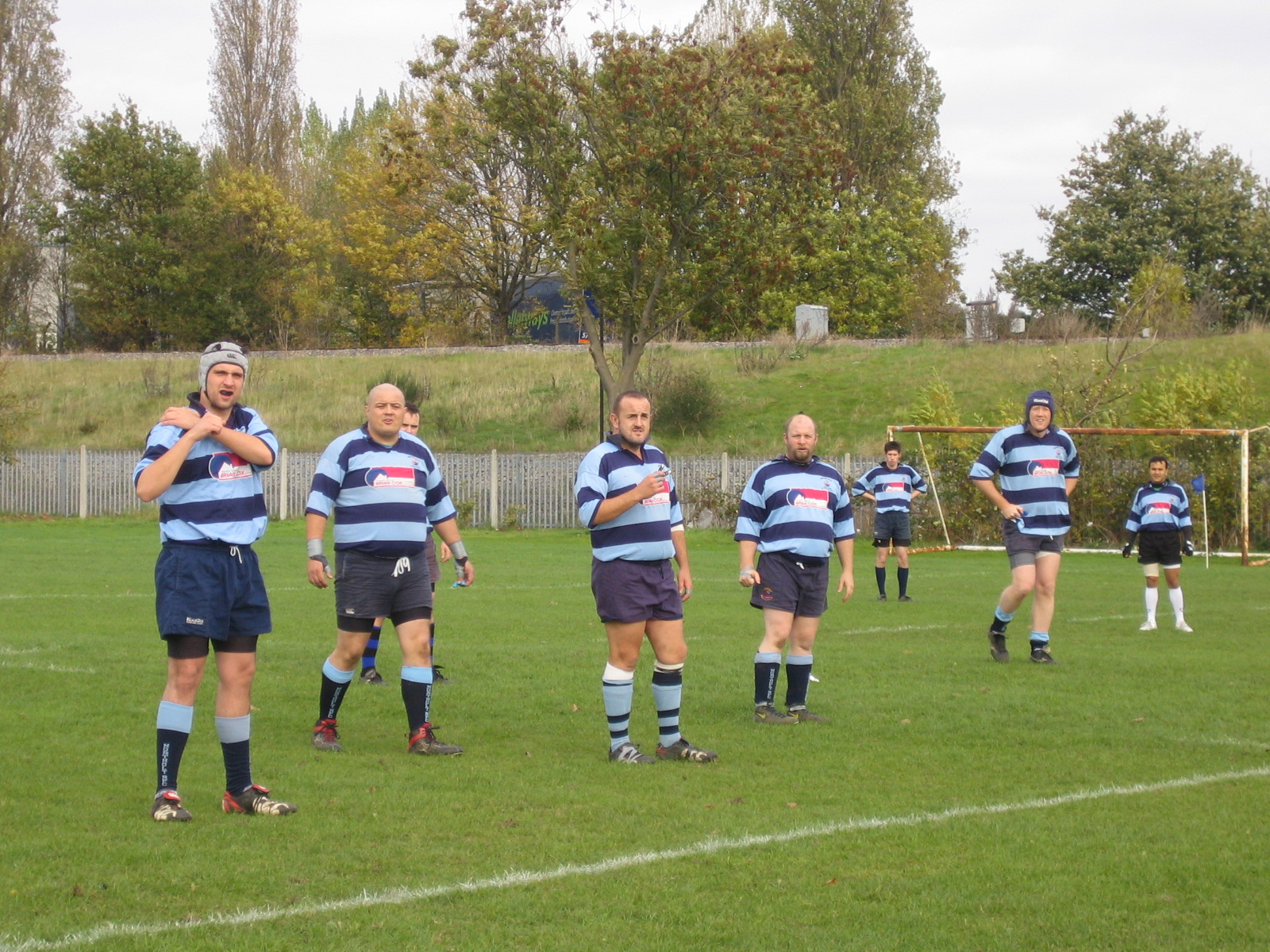
NRFC Forwards

== Community rugby ==
In 2005, NRFC registered as a Community Amateur Sports Club (CASC) it is open to various areas of the local community. The club plays host to a variety of other sports as well as local group meetings, such as the Neighbourhood Watch.

As part of a pilot project to develop a coordinated network of partner organisations, the Ealing Community Rugby Action Group (ECRAG) was established in 2003 to develop and promote rugby-based sporting opportunities for school-age young people of all abilities. The group consists of representatives from Active Ealing, the local rugby union development officer, local clubs, both West London Academy and Featherstone Sports College school sports partnerships and individuals in the community. Subsequently, since 2007, the club has inaugurated two annual rugby tournaments for local schools; one at Primary School level and the other at Secondary School level, and offers its grounds to those local schools that lack their own pitches and facilities.

In the Summer 2009, the RFU contributed £137,000 to a new changing room block for the club. NRFC also received £5600 from LB Ealing's Community Chest Project, and club funding of £6000 attracted an RFU 'Groundmatch' award of £6000. On 5 September, the opening ceremony was conducted by Jason Stacey, Leader of Ealing Council and Ward councillor Several members of the team have participated in Channel 4's 'The Sex Education Show' in a campaign to sensor pornographic technological downloads and promote safe sex amongst teenagers

On 7 October 2011, club Chairman Geoff Payne, along with player David Grace, appeared on BBC1's The One Show hosted by Alex Jones and Chris Evans as part of the buildup to England's quarter final game against France.

In late September 2012, Northolt RFC was announced as an 'RFU Accredited Club' for its efforts along the Club Accreditation scheme, based upon the six Key Drivers identified as crucial to a strong club:

- Retaining & Developing Players
- Recruiting New Players
- Recruiting & Retaining High Quality Coaches, Volunteers & Referees
- Effective & Efficient Facilities
- Effective & Efficient Management and Governance
- Integration with the Local Community

Each of these Key Drivers, together with the Core Values of the game, is represented within the Club Accreditation scheme.

== Club honours ==
- Herts/Middlesex 5 South Champions: 1996–97
- Herts/Middlesex 3 Champions: 1998–99
- Herts/Middlesex 2 Champions: 1999–00
- Middlesex Merit Division 4 Play Off League Champions: 2013–14
- Middlesex Merit Division 3 Play Off League Champions: 2014–15
- MIddlesex Merit Division 5 Play Off League Champions 2021–22
