= London French RFC =

(England) London French RFC
- Full name: London French Rugby Football Club
- Union: Middlesex RFU
- Founded: 1959; 67 years ago
- Location: Barnes, Richmond upon Thames, London, England
- Ground: Barn Elms Playing Fields (Capacity: 500)
- Coach: Nicolas Clement
- Captain: Matthieu Louis
- League: Counties 5 Surrey
- 2023-2024: Counties 5 Surrey 9th (Relegated)

Official website
- www.londonfrenchrfc.com

London French R.F.C. is a Rugby Union club based in Barnes in London. It was founded in 1959 by interns at the Lycée Français Charles de Gaulle of London. The club plays in Counties 5 Surrey.

== Club Honours ==
- Middlesex 4 champions: 1993–94
- Middlesex Senior Vase winners: 2003
- Herts/Middlesex 3 champions (2): 2007–08, 2013–14 (Note: One title was for Herts/Middlesex 3 South.)
- Counties 5 Surrey Runners-up 2023-2024
