= Hammersmith & Fulham RFC =

English rugby union club, based in Fulham, London

(England) Hammersmith & Fulham RFC
- Full name: Hammersmith & Fulham Rugby Football Club
- Union: Middlesex RFU
- Founded: 1978; 48 years ago
- Location: Fulham, England
- Ground: Hurlingham Park
- League: Regional 1 South Central
- 2025–26: 11th (relegated to Regional 2 South East)

Official website
- www.fulhamrugby.co.uk/rugby

Hammersmith & Fulham Rugby Club is a rugby union club based in Fulham, London. The 1st XV competes in Regional 2 South East following relegation from Regional 1 South Central in 2026. The club operates four senior men's teams, a women's side, a full range of youth teams, and uses Hurlingham Park.

== History ==
The club was the brainchild of a group of teachers from Henry Compton School, who in 1977, identified that there was a need for a club to cater for the rugby needs of the local residents and school children. The club was formed the following year.

Since club rugby was introduced in 1987, the club has made its way through the leagues, reaching tier 5 of the English rugby union system in 2023 after they were champions of Regional 2 Thames.

The club won the first two editions of the Middlesex RFU Senior Bowl and has been Middlesex RFU Senior Cup runner-up on two occasions; 2008–09 and 2014–15.

== Honours ==
- Regional 2 Thames champions: 2022–23
- London 2 North West champions: 2010–11
- London 4 North West champions: 2006–07
- Middlesex RFU Senior Bowl winners (2): 2003–04, 2004–05
