= Belsize Park RFC =

English rugby union club, based in London

(England) Belsize Park Rugby Club
- Full name: Belsize Park Rugby Club
- Union: Middlesex RFU
- Nickname: Belsize
- Founded: 1971; 55 years ago
- Location: Belsize Park, Camden, London
- Ground(s): Regent's Park, London
- Chairman: Thomas Symondson
- Director of Rugby: James Lindsay
- League: Regional 2 Thames
- 2024–25: 3rd
Team kit

Official website
- www.bprfc.co.uk

Belsize Park Rugby Club is a rugby union club based in Central London, England. BPRC have five senior men's, two senior women's and one veteran men's teams. Home matches are played in Regent's Park. The men's 1st XV previously played in London 1 North – a league at tier 6 of the English rugby union system – but following recent England Rugby adult male 'Future Competition Structure' changes, from the 2022–23 season the men's 1st team play in Regional 2 Thames.

== History ==
The original Belsize Park FC was founded in 1870 and was one of the twenty-one founding members of the Rugby Football Union. The club had folded by 1880 and was only formally re-established in 1971.

== Current ==
Belsize Park Rugby Club have five regular men's, two women's and one men's vets sides. The men's 1st XV play in the newly launched RFU level 6 Regional 2 Thames division, while the men's 2nd, 3rd, 4th and Bulls (5th) XVs compete in regional merit leagues. BPRC also field monthly Veterans and occasional 6th XV teams for pure social rugby.

After launching with development fixtures in 2019–20, Belsize Park women's team debuted in the ‘Women's NC 3 South East (Central)’ league in the 2021–22 season, which they won as Champions. After promotion the women now play in Women's NC Division 2 in 2022–23, with a new 2nd XV adding to the growth of women's rugby at the club.

The club trains at Coram's Fields and prides itself on being London's most central rugby club.

BPRC usually tours twice a year, one within mainland Britain and the other overseas. The club embarked on an unbroken series of international tours from 1989 to 2019, when COVID-19 halted the 2020 tour to Italy and the 2021 tour to Vietnam. Touring resumed in November 2021 and May 2022 with matches in Rugby, and County Donegal, Ireland. Destinations in the past have included mainland China, the Caribbean, North and South America, multiple Southern African countries and, more regularly, to European countries.

=== Clubhouse ===
Based in central London the club does not have its own clubhouse, they use the facilities of local drinking establishments and treat this as their home 'club pub'. Local pubs traditionally bid to host the club on weekends providing discounts on food and drink for players and supporters.

- 2022 – current: The Lock Tavern - Chalk Farm Road NW1
- 2021 – 2022: Sports Bar & Grill Marylebone - Melcombe Place NW1
- 2015 – 2021: The White Moustache - Stanhope Street NW1 (permanently closed)
- 2010 – 2015: Sheephaven Bay - Mornington Street NW1
- 2009 – 2010: The Masons Arms - Devonshire Street W1 (permanently closed)
- early –-2009: Chester Arms - Albany Street NW1 (permanently closed)

== Junior rugby ==
Belsize Park RC has an affiliate Junior rugby section also in Regent's Park, called the Regent Park Royals coaching ages 6–12.

== 1st XV honours ==
- Herts/Middlesex 3 South champions: 2003–04
- London 2 North West champions: 2018–19

== See also ==
- Regent's Park
- London Borough of Camden
- Rugby Union in London
