= Hertfordshire Presidents' Tankard =

Rugby union competition in England

- Sport: Rugby Union
- Instituted: 2010; 16 years ago
- Number of teams: 10
- Country: England
- Holders: St Albans (3rd title) (2018-19)
- Most titles: St Albans (3 titles)
- Website: Hertfordshire RFU

The Hertfordshire Presidents' Tankard is an annual rugby union knock-out club competition organized by the Hertfordshire Rugby Football Union. It was first introduced during the 2010–11 season, with the inaugural winners being St Albans. It is the second most important rugby union cup competition in Hertfordshire, behind the Hertfordshire Presidents' Cup but ahead of the Hertfordshire Presidents' Trophy.

The Presidents' Tankard is currently open to the first teams of club sides based in Hertfordshire that play in tier 7 (London 2 North West) and tier 8 (London 3 North West) of the English rugby union league system. The format is a knockout cup with a preliminary round, first round, semi-finals and a final to be held at Allianz Park (Saracen's home ground) in April–May, on the same date and same venue as the Cup and Trophy finals.

== Hertfordshire Presidents' Tankard winners ==
Hertfordshire Presidents' Tankard Finals
Season	Winner	Score	Runners–up	Venue
2009-10	St Albans		Hitchin	Cotlandswick, London Colney, Hertfordshire
2010-11	Welwyn	29-13	Harpenden	Cotlandswick, London Colney, Hertfordshire
2011-12	St Albans	42-7	Stevenage Town	
2012-13	Tabard	41-14	Welwyn	Chaulden Lane, Hemel Hempstead, Hertfordshire
2013-14	Fullerians	15-3	Datchworth	Coningesby Drive, Watford, Hertfordshire
2014-15	Welwyn	47-12	Stevenage Town	Allianz Park, Hendon, London
2015-16	Datchworth	31-24	Stevenage Town	Allianz Park, Hendon, London
2016-17	Stevenage Town	36-7	Welwyn	Allianz Park, Hendon, London
2017-18	Hemel Hempstead	46-20	Datchworth	Allianz Park, Hendon, London
2018-19	St Albans			

== Number of wins ==
- St Albans (3)
- Welwyn (2)
- Datchworth (1)
- Fullerians (1)
- Hemel Hempstead (1)
- Stevenage Town (1)
- Tabard (1)

== See also ==
- Hertfordshire RFU
- Hertfordshire Presidents' Cup
- Hertfordshire Presidents' Trophy
- English rugby union system
- Rugby union in England
