= 2010–11 Rugby Union County Championship =

English rugby union competition

2010–2011 Bill Beaumont Cup County Championship
- Countries: England
- Champions: Lancashire (21st title)
- Runners-up: Hertfordshire

The 2010–11 Bill Beaumont Cup (Rugby Union County Championship) was the 111th edition of England's County Championship rugby union club competition.

Lancashire won their 21st title after defeating Hertfordshire in the final.

== Final ==
29 May 2011

Lancashire	32–23	Hertfordshire
Try: Riley, Hughes, McGowan, Moore, Brennand; Con: Davies (2); Pen: Davies		Try: White, Cooper-Miller, Micans; Con: Gregg; Pen: Gregg (2)

Twickenham

Adam Armstrong	Barking
Tom Hughes	Preston Grasshoppers
Chris Briers	Fylde
Matthew Riley	Sedgley Park
Oliver Brennand	Fylde
Alex Davies	Plymouth Albion
Steve Collins	Fylde
Dan Birchall	Sedgley Park
Alex Loney (capt)	Rotherham Titans
Peter Altham	Fylde
Louis McGowan	Rotherham Titans
Gareth Rawlings	Longton
Sam Beaumont	Fylde
Steve McGinnis	Fylde
Juan Crous	Sedgley Park
Replacements:
Simon Griffiths	Liverpool St Helens
Mark Rylance	Caldy
Grant Ferguson	Fylde
Paul Arnold	Fylde
Matthew Charters	Preston Grasshoppers
Chris Johnson	Huddersfield
James Moore	Vale of Lune

Richard Gregg	Old Albanian
James Tirrell	Letchworth Garden City
Stuart Smart	Hertford
Chris Lombaard	Old Albanian
Ian Crompton	Hertford
James Shanahan	Old Albanian
Stefan Liebenberg	Old Albanian
James Ellershaw	Old Albanian
Brett MacNamee (capt)	Hertford
Robert Schillaci	Hertford
Craig South	Hertford
David Shotton	Tring
Lawrence White	Old Albanian
Chris Rainbow	Hertford
Josh Corcoran	Hertford
Replacements:
Wes Cope	Old Albanian
Arran MacDougall	Hertford
Olly Day	Bishop's Stortford
Torran MacDougall	Hertford
Oliver Cooper-Millar	Old Albanian
Zac Vinncombe	Old Albanian
Tom Newton	Tring

== See also ==
- English rugby union system
- Rugby union in England
