= Hertfordshire Presidents' Trophy =

English rugby union competition

Hertfordshire presidents' Trophy
- Sport: Rugby Union
- Instituted: 1999; 27 years ago
- Number of teams: 7
- Country: England
- Holders: Royston (3rd title) (2017–18)
- Most titles: Verulamians (6 titles)
- Website: Hertfordshire RFU

The Hertfordshire presidents' Trophy is an annual rugby union knock-out club competition organised by the Hertfordshire Rugby Football Union. It was first introduced during the 1999–00 season, with the inaugural winners being Datchworth. It is the third most important rugby union cup competition in Hertfordshire, behind the Hertfordshire presidents' Cup and Hertfordshire presidents' Tankard.

The presidents' Trophy is currently open to the first teams of club sides based in Hertfordshire that play in tier 9 (Herts/Middlesex 1) and tier 10 (Herts/Middlesex 2) of the English rugby union league system. The format is a knockout cup with a first round, semi-finals and a final to be held at Allianz Park (Saracen's home ground) in April–May, on the same date and same venue as the Cup and Tankard finals.

== Hertfordshire presidents' Trophy winners ==
Hertfordshire presidents' Tankard Finals
Season	Winner	Score	Runners–up	Venue
1999–2000	Datchworth			
2000–01	Stevenage Town			
2001–02	Tring			
2002–03	Tring			
2003–04	Tring		Old Ashmolean	
2004–05	Hitchin			
2005–06	Old Ashmolean		Hemel Hempstead	
2006–07	Hemel Hempstead		Barnet Elizabethans	War Memorial Sports Ground, Northwood, London
2007–08	Hemel Hempstead	21–6	Hitchin	Woollam Playing Fields, St Albans, Hertfordshire
2008–09	Old Ashmolean	16–13	Datchworth	War Memorial Sports Ground, Northwood, London
2009–10	Verulamians		Royston	
2010–11	Verulamians	67–5	Chess Valley	Redbourn Lane, Harpenden, Hertfordshire
2011–12	Watford	5–3	Verulamians	
2012–13	Royston	38–10	Borehamwood	Radlett Road, Watford, Hertfordshire
2013–14	Verulamians	18–8	Royston	Hobbs Way, Welwyn Garden City, Hertfordshire
2014–15	Royston	14–7	Cheshunt	Allianz Park, Hendon, London
2015–16	Verulamians	46–10	Watford	Allianz Park, Hendon, London
2016–17	Verulamians	53–10	Barnet Elizabethans	Allianz Park, Hendon, London
2017–18	Royston	28–12	Barnet Elizabethans	Allianz Park, Hendon, London
2018–19				

== Number of wins ==
- Verulamians (5)
- Royston (3)
- Tring (3)
- Hemel Hempstead (2)
- Old Ashmolean (2)
- Datchworth (1)
- Hitchin (1)
- Stevenage Town (1)
- Watford (1)

== See also ==
- Hertfordshire RFU
- Hertfordshire presidents' Cup
- Hertfordshire presidents' Tankard
- English rugby union system
- Rugby union in England
