= Hertfordshire Presidents' Cup =

English rugby union annual competition

Hertfordshire presidents' Cup
- Sport: Rugby Union
- Instituted: 1970; 56 years ago
- Number of teams: 6
- Country: England
- Holders: Bishop's Stortford Blues (8th title) (2017–18)
- Most titles: Tabard (11 titles)
- Website: Hertfordshire RFU

The Hertfordshire presidents' Cup is an annual rugby union knock-out club competition organised by the Hertfordshire Rugby Football Union. It was first introduced during the 1970–71 season, with the inaugural winners being Fullerians. It is the most important rugby union cup competition in Hertfordshire, ahead of the Hertfordshire presidents' Tankard and Hertfordshire presidents' Trophy.

The presidents' Cup is currently open to the first teams of club sides based in Hertfordshire that play in tier 6 (London 1 North) of the English rugby union league system, as well as the 2nd teams of higher ranked clubs in the region (tiers 3–5). The format is a knockout cup with a first round, semi-finals and a final to be held at Allianz Park (Saracen's home ground) in April–May on the same date and same venue as the Tankard and Trophy finals.

== Hertfordshire presidents' Cup winners ==
Hertfordshire presidents' Cup Finals
Season	Winner	Score	Runners–up	Venue
1970–71	Fullerians			
1971–72	Bishop's Stortford			
1972–73	Old Verulamian			
1973–74	Fullerians			
1974–75	Hemel Hempstead			
1975–76	Fullerians			
1976–77	Letchworth Garden City			
1977–78	Letchworth Garden City			
1978–79	Bishop's Stortford			
1979–80	Fullerians			
1980–81	Hertford			
1981–82	Hertford			
1982–83	Tabard			
1983–84	Fullerians			
1984–85	Cheshunt			
1985–86	Hertford	12–6	Letchworth Garden City	
1986–87	Letchworth Garden City	18–3	Hertford	
1987–88	Tabard			
1988–89	Cheshunt			
1989–90	Tabard			
1990–91	Cheshunt			
1991–92	Tabard			
1992–93	Tabard			
1993–94	Tabard			
1994–95	Tabard			
1995–96	Bishop's Stortford			
1996–97	Cheshunt			
1997–98	Old Albanian	15-13	Old Verulamian	
1998–99	Cheshunt			
1999-00	Tabard			
2000–01	Tabard			
2001–02	Tabard	20–0	Letchworth Garden City	
2002–03	Tabard	27–3	Fullerians	
2003–04	Hertford	14–9	St Albans	War Memorial Sports Ground, Northwood, London
2004–05	Hertford	45–12	Letchworth Garden City	
2005–06	Hertford	41–12	Stevenage Town	
2006–07	Hertford	10–3	Stevenage Town	War Memorial Sports Ground, Northwood, London
2007–08	Hertford	26–5	Stevenage Town	War Memorial Sports Ground, Northwood, London
2008–09	Bishop's Stortford	22–16 (aet)	Old Albanian	War Memorial Sports Ground, Northwood, London
2009–10	Old Albanian	37–19	Bishop's Stortford	Croxley Guild of Sport, Croxley Green, Hertfordshire
2010–11	Hertford	40–15	Tring	Redbourn Lane, Harpenden, Hertfordshire
2011–12	Tring	40–0	Hertford II	Redbourn Lane, Harpenden, Hertfordshire
2012–13	Bishop's Stortford Blues	34–8	Letchworth Garden City	Chaulden Lane, Hemel Hempstead, Hertfordshire
2013–14	Letchworth Garden City	22–15	Bishop's Stortford Blues	Boggymead Springs, St Albans, Hertfordshire
2014–15	Letchworth Garden City	33–16	Old Albanian Romans	Allianz Park, Hendon, London
2015–16	Bishop's Stortford Blues	38–18 (aet)	Hertford II	Allianz Park, Hendon, London
2016–17	Bishop's Stortford Blues	44–14	Tring II	Allianz Park, Hendon, London
2017–18	Bishop's Stortford Blues	8–3	Fullerians	Allianz Park, Hendon, London
2018–19	Fullerians	64-20	Old Albanian Romans	Redbourn Lane, Harpenden, Hertfordshire
2019-20	Competition was not held due to COVID-19			
2020-21	Competition was not held due to COVID-19			
2021-22	Letchworth Garden City	47-30	Fullerians	Redbourn Lane, Harpenden, Hertfordshire
2022-23	Hemel Hempstead	24-10	Hitchin	Andrews Lane, Cheshunt, Hertfordshire

== Number of wins ==
- Tabard (11)
- Hertford (9)
- Bishop's Stortford (8) (Note: Includes 4 titles won by the Bishop's Stortford Blues (2nd XV).)
- Fullerians (6)
- Letchworth Garden CIty (6)
- Cheshunt (5)
- Old Albanian (2)
- Hemel Hempstead (2)
- Tring (1)
- Old Verulamian (1)

== See also ==
- Hertfordshire RFU
- Hertfordshire presidents' Tankard
- Hertfordshire presidents' Trophy
- English rugby union system
- Rugby union in England
