= Counties 1 Hertfordshire =

English rugby union league

- Current season or competition: 2025–26 Counties 1 Hertfordshire
- Sport: Rugby union
- Instituted: 1987; 39 years ago (as London 3 North West)
- Number of teams: 10
- Country: England
- Holders: Brunel University (2024–25)
- Most titles: Hertford, Tabard (3 titles)
- Website: englandrugby.com

Counties 1 Hertfordshire (formerly Counties 1 Herts/Middlesex and before that London 2 North West) is a tier 7 English rugby union league. It is organised by the London and South East Division Rugby Football Union and is the top-tier competition for clubs primarily in Hertfordshire together with others from parts of north-west London (that was traditionally encompassed by the historic county of Middlesex) and Essex. It was previously known as London 2 North West. After the restructuring of the English rugby union system ahead of the 2022–23 season, the league was renamed to Counties 1 Herts/Middlesex. Ahead of the 2025–26 season a decision was taken to split Hertfordshire RFU and Middlesex RFU clubs, with Middlesex teams moving on a level transfer to Counties 1 Middlesex while club 2XVs were introduced to the league. Brunel University are the current champions.

Each year the two Hertfordshire clubs in this division with the best record against other Hertfordshire clubs also take part in the Hertfordshire Presidents' Cup, the highest level county cup competition in Hertfordshire. Promoted teams typically go up to Regional 2 Thames while relegated teams drop to Counties 2 Hertfordshire.

== Format ==
The champions are promoted to Regional 2 Thames while one or two teams are relegated to Counties 2 Hertsfordshire. Since 2025–26 the league includes Essex clubs precluded from competing in Essex Rugby leagues which don't permit reserve sides in first XV leagues. The season runs from September to April and comprises eighteen rounds of matches, with each club playing each of its rivals, home and away. The results of the matches contribute points to the league as follows:

- 4 points are awarded for a win
- 2 points are awarded for a draw
- 0 points are awarded for a loss, however
- 1 losing (bonus) point is awarded to a team that loses a match by 7 points or fewer
- 1 additional (bonus) point is awarded to a team scoring 4 tries or more in a match.

== 2026–27 ==
Departing were Cheshunt promoted to Regional 2 Anglia. Also leaving on a level transfer to Counties 1 Essex were Eton Manor II (5th) and Southend Priors (9th). There was no relegation.

Team	Ground	Capacity	City/Area	Previous season
Biggleswade	Langford Road		Biggleswade, Bedfordshire	Level transfer from Counties 1 Midlands East (South) (11th)
Bishop's Stortford II	Silver Leys	1,600	Bishop's Stortford, Hertfordshire	7th
Datchworth	Datchworth Sports Club		Datchworth, Hertfordshire	Promoted from Counties 2 Hertfordshire (champions)
Fullerians	Coningsby Drive		Watford, Hertfordshire	8th
Hemel Hempstead	Chaulden Lane		Hemel Hempstead, Hertfordshire	6th
Hertford II	Highfields		Ware, Hertfordshire	4th
Hitchin	King George V Playing Fields		Hitchin, Hertfordshire	3rd
Old Albanian II	Woollam's Playing Fields	1,000	St Albans, Hertfordshire	2nd
Royston	The Heath Sports Centre		Royston, Hertfordshire	Promoted from Counties 2 Hertfordshire (runners-up)
Welwyn	Hobbs Way		Welwyn Garden City, Hertfordshire	10th

Locations of the 2026–27 Counties 1 Hertfordshire teams

== 2025–26 ==
This was the first season with the league containing mainly Hertfordshire RFU clubs. Leaving on a level transfer to the newly re-formed Counties 1 Middlesex league were Chiswick (9th), Ealing Trailfinders 1871 (4th), Finchley (3rd), Ruislip (6th) and Old Streetonians (5th). Also departing were Brunel University promoted to Regional 2 Thames while Hackney (11th) and Datchworth (12th) were relegated to Counties 2 Middlesex and Counties 2 Hertfordshire respectively.

Team	Ground	Capacity	City/Area	Previous season
Bishop's Stortford II	Silver Leys	1,600	Bishop's Stortford, Hertfordshire	New entry
Cheshunt	Rosedale Sports Club		Cheshunt, Hertfordshire, Hertfordshire	2nd
Eton Manor II	The New Wilderness		Wanstead, London	New entry
Fullerians	Coningsby Drive		Watford, Hertfordshire	10th
Hemel Hempstead	Chaulden Lane		Hemel Hempstead, Hertfordshire	Relegated from Regional 2 Thames (11th)
Hertford II	Highfields		Ware, Hertfordshire	New entry
Hitchin	King George V Playing Fields		Hitchin, Hertfordshire	8th
Old Albanian II	Woollam's Playing Fields	1,000	St Albans, Hertfordshire	New entry
Southend Priors	Warners Bridge Park		Southend, Essex	New entry
Welwyn	Hobbs Way		Welwyn Garden City, Hertfordshire	7th

Locations of the 2025–26 Counties 1 Hertfordshire teams in Hertfordshire
Locations of the 2025–26 Counties 1 Hertfordshire teams in London & Essex

== 2024–25 ==
Departing were London Scottish Lions promoted to Regional 2 Thames, and Enfield Ignatians and Hampstead relegated to Counties 2 Herts/Middlesex. Joining were Brunel University and Ealing Trailfinders 1871, promoted from Counties 2 Herts/Middlesex, together with Fullerians, relegated from Regional 2 Thames.

Team	Ground	Capacity	City/Area	Previous season
Brunel University	Brunel University Sports Park		Uxbridge, London	Promoted from Counties 2 Herts/Middlesex (champions)
Cheshunt	Rosedale Sports Club		Cheshunt, Hertfordshire, Hertfordshire	4th
Chiswick	Dukes Meadows		Chiswick, London	5th
Datchworth	Datchworth Sports Club		Datchworth, Hertfordshire	10th
Ealing Trailfinders 1871	Trailfinders Sports Ground	4,000	West Ealing, London	Promoted from Counties 2 Herts/Middlesex (2nd)
Finchley	Summers Lane	1,000	Finchley, London	3rd
Fullerians	Coningsby Drive		Watford, Hertfordshire	Relegated from Regional 2 Thames (11th)
Hackney	Spring Hill Recreation Ground		Upper Clapton, London	9th
Hitchin	King George V Playing Fields		Hitchin, Hertfordshire	7th
Old Streetonians	Haggerston Park		Shoreditch, London	2nd
Ruislip	West End Road		Ruislip, London	8th
Welwyn	Hobbs Way		Welwyn Garden City, Hertfordshire	6th

Locations of the 2024–25 Counties 1 Herts/Middlesex teams in Hertfordshire
Locations of the 2024–25 Counties 1 Herts/Middlesex teams in Greater London

=== League table ===
Counties 1 Herts/Middx 2024–25
	Team	Played	Won	Drawn	Lost	Points for	Points against	Points diff	Try bonus	Loss bonus	Points	Adjust
1	Brunel University (P)	22	20	1	1	1085	326	759	20	1	104	+1
2	Cheshunt	22	18	1	3	1028	356	672	18	2	94	
3	Finchley	22	18	0	4	798	274	524	17	4	93	
4	Ealing Trailfinders 1871	22	18	0	4	768	307	461	13	2	89	+2
5	Old Streetonians	22	11	1	10	519	603	−84	9	2	57	
6	Ruislip	22	9	1	12	546	747	−201	13	3	54	
7	Welwyn	22	9	0	13	423	773	−350	10	2	48	
8	Hitchin	22	8	1	13	442	748	−306	8	1	44	+1
9	Chiswick	22	8	0	14	442	674	−232	9	3	44	
10	Fullerians	22	5	1	16	367	605	−238	6	5	33	
11	Hackney (R)	22	3	0	19	262	802	−540	3	1	16	
12	Datchworth (R)	22	2	0	20	326	791	−465	2	2	12	
If teams are level at any stage, tiebreakers are applied in the following order: 1. Number of matches won 2. Number of draws 3. Difference between points for and against 4. Total number of points for 5. Aggregate number of points scored in matches between tied teams 6. Number of matches won excluding the first match, then the second and so on until the tie is settled
Green background is the promotion place. Pink background are the relegation places. Source:

== 2023–24 ==
Departing were Hemel Hempstead and Grasshoppers, promoted to Regional 2 Thames. There was no relegation. Joining were Cheshunt and London Scottish Lions, both promoted from Counties 2 Herts/Middlesex.

Team	Ground	Capacity	City/Area	Previous season
Cheshunt	Rosedale Sports Club		Cheshunt, Hertfordshire, Hertfordshire	Promoted from Counties 2 Herts/Middlesex (champions)
Chiswick	Dukes Meadows		Chiswick, London	3rd
Datchworth	Datchworth Sports Club		Datchworth, Hertfordshire	10th
Enfield Ignatians	Donkey Lane		Enfield, London, London	12th
Finchley	Summers Lane	1,000	Finchley, London	7th
Hackney	Spring Hill Recreation Ground		Upper Clapton, London	11th
Hampstead	Parliament Hill Fields		Highgate, London	9th
Hitchin	King George V Playing Fields		Hitchin, Hertfordshire	5th
London Scottish Lions	King's House Sports Ground		Chiswick, London	Promoted from Counties 2 Herts/Middlesex (2nd)
Old Streetonians	Haggerston Park		Shoreditch, London	4th
Ruislip	West End Road		Ruislip, London	6th
Welwyn	Hobbs Way		Welwyn Garden City, Hertfordshire	8th

Locations of the 2023–24 Counties 1 Herts/Middlesex teams in Hertfordshire
Locations of the 2023–24 Counties 1 Herts/Middlesex teams in Greater London

=== League table ===
Counties 1 Herts/Middx 2023–24
	Team	Played	Won	Drawn	Lost	Points for	Points against	Points diff	Try bonus	Loss bonus	Points	Adjust
1	London Scottish Lions (P)	22	18	0	4	832	346	486	17	1	91	+1
2	Old Streetonians	22	18	0	4	728	447	281	13	0	85	
3	Finchley	22	16	1	5	755	325	430	15	3	84	
4	Cheshunt	22	15	1	6	798	392	406	17	2	81	
5	Chiswick	22	15	2	5	662	400	262	12	1	78	−1
6	Welwyn	22	12	0	10	457	447	10	11	2	62	−1
7	Hitchin	22	10	0	12	523	593	−70	10	2	52	
8	Ruislip	22	8	0	14	539	642	−103	10	3	45	
9	Hackney	22	6	0	16	368	585	−217	6	4	34	
10	Datchworth	22	6	0	16	330	792	−462	5	3	32	
11	Hampstead (R)	22	4	0	18	438	732	−294	9	3	23	−5
12	Enfield Ignatians (R)	22	2	0	20	246	975	−729	2	2	2	−10
If teams are level at any stage, tiebreakers are applied in the following order: 1. Number of matches won 2. Number of draws 3. Difference between points for and against 4. Total number of points for 5. Aggregate number of points scored in matches between tied teams 6. Number of matches won excluding the first match, then the second and so on until the tie is settled
Green background is the promotion place. Pink background are the relegation places. Source:

== 2022–23 ==
This was the first season following the RFU Adult Competition Review. The league was substantially similar to London 2 North West with eight of the teams competing in the previous season, while the top four moved to Regional 2 Thames or Regional 2 Anglia. They were replaced with the top three from London 3 North West and Chiswick on a level transfer from London 2 South West.

Team	Ground	Capacity	City/Area	Previous season
Chiswick	Dukes Meadows		Chiswick, London	Level transfer from L2SW (8th)
Datchworth	Datchworth Sports Club		Datchworth, Hertfordshire	12th
Enfield Ignatians	Donkey Lane		Enfield, London, London	9th
Finchley	Summers Lane	1,000	Finchley, London	Promoted from L3NW (1st)
Grasshoppers	MacFarlane Lane		Isleworth, London	6th
Hackney	Spring Hill Recreation Ground		Upper Clapton, London	11th
Hampstead	Parliament Hill Fields		Highgate, London	10th
Hemel Hempstead	Chaulden Lane		Hemel Hempstead, Hertfordshire	7th
Hitchin	King George V Playing Fields		Hitchin, Hertfordshire	Promoted from L3NW (3rd)
Old Streetonians	Haggerston Park		Shoreditch, London	5th
Ruislip	West End Road		Ruislip, London	8th
Welwyn	Hobbs Way		Welwyn Garden City, Hertfordshire	Promoted from L3NW (2nd)

Locations of the 2022–23 Counties 1 Herts/Middlesex teams in Hertfordshire
Locations of the 2022–23 Counties 1 Herts/Middlesex teams in Greater London

=== League table ===
Counties 1 Herts/Middx 2022–23
	Team	Played	Won	Drawn	Lost	Points for	Points against	Points diff	Try bonus	Loss bonus	Points	Adjust
1	Hemel Hempstead (P)	22	20	0	2	735	347	388	17	0	97	
2	Grasshoppers (P)	22	18	0	4	719	414	305	18	3	94	+1
3	Chiswick	22	17	0	5	610	418	192	14	3	85	
4	Old Streetonians	22	14	0	8	659	448	211	13	5	74	
5	Hitchin	22	12	1	9	658	480	178	15	4	70	−1
6	Ruislip	22	10	0	12	451	591	−140	10	4	55	−1
7	Finchley	22	9	0	13	511	518	−7	11	5	52	
8	Welwyn	22	9	0	13	545	673	−128	11	4	51	
9	Hampstead	22	8	0	14	506	629	−123	9	2	43	
10	Datchworth	22	6	1	15	404	645	−241	8	3	37	
11	Hackney	22	4	0	18	355	557	−202	4	5	25	
12	Enfield Ignatians	22	4	0	18	298	731	−433	4	2	22	
If teams are level at any stage, tiebreakers are applied in the following order: 1. Number of matches won 2. Number of draws 3. Difference between points for and against 4. Total number of points for 5. Aggregate number of points scored in matches between tied teams 6. Number of matches won excluding the first match, then the second and so on until the tie is settled
Green background are the promotion places. Source:

== 2021–22 ==
The teams competing in 2021–-22 achieved their places in the league based on performances in 2019–20, the 'previous season' column in the table below refers to that season and not 2020–21.

Team	Ground	Capacity	City/Area	Previous season
Datchworth	Datchworth Sports Club		Datchworth, Hertfordshire	10th
Enfield Ignatians	Donkey Lane		Enfield Town, London	Promoted from London 3 NW (2nd)
Fullerians	Coningsby Drive		Watford, Hertfordshire	6th
Grasshoppers	MacFarlane Lane		Isleworth, London	7th
H.A.C.	Artillery Ground		Finsbury, London	Relegated from London 1 South (12th)
Hackney	Spring Hill Recreation Ground		Upper Clapton, London	9th
Hampstead	Parliament Hill Fields		Highgate, London	4th
Hemel Hempstead	Chaulden Lane		Hemel Hempstead, Hertfordshire	7th
Letchworth Garden City	Legends Lane, Baldock Road		Letchworth, Hertfordshire	8th
Old Priorians	Perivale		Greenford, London	Relegated from London 1 North (12th)
Old Streetonians	Haggerston Park		Shoreditch, London	Promoted from London 3 NW (champions)
Ruislip	West End Road		Ruislip, London	Relegated from London 1 North (14th)

Locations of the 2021–22 London 2 North West teams in Hertfordshire
Location of 2021–22 London 2 North West teams in London

== Season 2020–21 ==
On 30 October, owing to the COVID-19 pandemic in the United Kingdom, the RFU announced that a decision had been taken to cancel Adult Competitive Leagues (National League 1 and below) for the 2020–21 season meaning London 2 North West was not contested.

== 2019–20 ==
Team	Ground	Capacity	City/Area	Previous season
Chiswick	Duke's Meadows		Chiswick, London	3rd
Datchworth	Datchworth Sports Club		Datchworth, Hertfordshire	Promoted from London 3 NW (2nd)
Fullerians	Coningsby Drive		Watford, Hertfordshire	Relegated from London 1 North (12th)
Grasshoppers	MacFarlane Lane		Isleworth, London	7th
Hackney	Spring Hill Recreation Ground		Upper Clapton, London	10th
Hammersmith & Fulham	Hurlingham Park		Fulham, London	8th
Hampstead	Parliament Hill Fields		Highgate, London	4th
Hemel Hempstead	Chaulden Lane		Hemel Hempstead, Hertfordshire	5th
Letchworth Garden City	Baldock Road		Letchworth, Hertfordshire	9th
London Welsh	Old Deer Park	5,850 (1,000 seats)	Richmond, London	Promoted from London 3 NW (champions)
Luton	Newlands Road		Luton, Bedfordshire	Relegated from London 1 North (13th)
Welwyn	Hobbs Way		Welwyn Garden City, Hertfordshire	6th

Locations of the 2019–20 London 2 North West teams in Hertfordshire & Bedfordshire
Location of 2019–20 London 2 North West teams in London

== 2018–19 ==
Team	Ground	Capacity	City/Area	Previous season
Belsize Park	Regent's Park		Belsize Park, London	4th
Chiswick	Duke's Meadows		Chiswick, London	7th
Enfield Ignatians	Donkey Lane		Enfield Town, London	10th
Grasshoppers	MacFarlane Lane		Isleworth, London	Promoted from London 3 NW (champions)
Hammersmith & Fulham	Hurlingham Park		Fulham, London	8th
Hampstead	Parliament Hill Fields		Highgate, London	2nd (lost play-off)
Harpenden	Redbourn Lane		Harpenden, Hertfordshire	3rd
Hemel Hempstead	Chaulden Lane		Hemel Hempstead, Hertfordshire	9th
Letchworth Garden City	Baldock Road		Letchworth, Hertfordshire	Relegated from London 1 North (13th)
London Nigerian	Heston Sports Ground		Cranford, London	5th
Welwyn	Hobbs Way		Welwyn Garden City, Hertfordshire	Promoted from London 3 NW (2nd)

Locations of the 2018–19 London 2 North West teams in Hertfordshire
Location of 2018–19 London 2 North West clubs in London

== 2017–18 ==
Team	Ground	Capacity	City/Area	Previous season
Belsize Park	Regent's Park		Belsize Park, London	4th
Chiswick	Duke's Meadows		Chiswick, London	Relegated from London 1 South (12th)
Enfield Ignatians	Donkey Lane		Enfield Town, London	9th
H.A.C.	Artillery Ground		Finsbury, London	2nd (Note: H.A.C. won the 2016–17 play-off, but were denied promotion and the result overturned by the RFU due to H.A.C. fielding an ineligible player.)
Hackney	Spring Hill Recreation Ground		Upper Clapton, London	Promoted from London 3 North West (champions)
Hammersmith & Fulham	Hurlingham Park		Fulham, London	8th
Hampstead	Parliament Hill Fields		Highgate, London	3rd
Harpenden	Redbourn Lane		Harpenden, Hertfordshire	5th
Harrow	Grove Field		Stanmore, London	6th
Hemel Hempstead	Chaulden Lane		Hemel Hempstead, Hertfordshire	Promoted from London 3 North West (2nd)
London Nigerian	Heston Sports Ground		Cranford, London	10th
Tabard	Cobden Hill		Radlett, Hertfordshire	7th

Locations of the 2017–18 London 2 North West teams in Hertfordshire
Location of 2017–18 London 2 North West clubs in London

== 2016–17 ==
- Belsize Park (promoted from London 3 North West)
- Enfield Ignatians
- H.A.C.
- Hammersmith & Fulham
- Hampstead
- Harpenden
- Harrow (relegated from London 1 North)
- London Nigerian (promoted from London 3 North West)
- Old Haberdashers
- Stockwood Park
- Tabard
- Welwyn

== 2015–16 ==
- Enfield Ignations (transferred from London 2 North East)
- Fullerians (promoted from London 3 North West)
- H.A.C.
- Hammersmith & Fulham
- Hampstead
- Harpenden
- Old Haberdashers
- Old Merchant Taylors'
- Staines
- Tabard
- Welwyn (promoted from London 3 North West)
- Woodford (relegated from London 1 North)

== 2014–15 ==
- Chiswick
- H.A.C.
- Hammersmith & Fulham
- Hampstead
- Harpenden
- Harrow (promoted from London 3 North West)
- Hemel Hempstead
- Old Haberdashers
- Old Merchant Taylors' (promoted from London 3 North West)
- St Albans
- Staines (relegated from London 1 South)
- Tabard (relegated from London 1 North)

== 2013–14 ==
- Beaconsfield (relegated from London 1 North)
- Chiswick
- H.A.C.
- Hammersmith & Fulham
- Hampstead
- Harpenden
- Hemel Hempstead
- London Nigerian
- Old Priorians (promoted from London 3 North West)
- St Albans
- Twickenham
- U.C.S. Old Boys

== 2012–13 ==
- Chiswick
- Fullerians
- Grasshoppers
- H.A.C.
- Hammersmith & Fulham (relegated from London 1 North)
- Hampstead
- Harpenden
- Hemel Hempstead
- London Nigerian
- St Albans
- Tabard
- U.C.S. Old Boys

== Original teams ==
When league rugby began in 1987 this division, known as London 3 North West, contained the following teams:

- Bacavians
- Bishop's Stortford
- Fullerians
- Harrow
- Hendon
- Kingsburians (Note: Kingsburians later merged with Gaytonians and Roxeth Manor to form West London RFC.)
- Letchworth Garden City
- Mill Hill
- Old Paulines
- Tabard
- Twickenham

== Counties 1 Herts honours ==
=== London 3 North West (1987–1993) ===
Originally known as London 3 North West, this division was a tier 7 league with promotion to London 2 North and relegation to either Hertfordshire 1 or Middlesex 1.

London 3 North West
Season	No of teams	Champions	Runner-up	Relegated teams
1987–88	11	Bishop's Stortford	Hendon	Old Paulines, Twickenham
1988–89	11	Finchley	Tabard	Letchworth Garden City, Hendon, Harrow
1989–90	11	Tabard	Fullerians	Twickenham, Bacavians
1990–91	11	Letchworth Garden City	Hertford	Mill Hill, Uxbridge
1991–92	11	Upper Clapton	Lensbury	St. Mary's Hospital, Hemel Hempstead
1992–93	13	Verulamians	Letchworth Garden City	Harpenden, Old Millhillians
Green backgrounds are promotion places.

=== London 3 North West (1993–1996) ===
At the end of the 1992–93 season, the top six teams from London 1 and the top six from South West 1 were combined to create National 5 South. As a consequent, London 3 North West dropped from a tier 7 league to a tier 8 league for the years that National 5 South was active. Promotion continued to London 2 North, while relegation was to the newly introduced Herts/Middlesex.

London 3 North West
Season	No of teams	Champions	Runner-up	Relegated teams
1993–94	13	Staines	Letchworth Garden City	Old Meadonians, Fullerians
1994–95	13	Hertford	Grasshoppers	London New Zealand, Upper Clapton
1995–96	13	Old Albanian	Old Gaytonians	Mill Hill, Old Elizabethans
Green backgrounds are promotion places.

=== London 3 North West (1996–2000) ===
With the cancellation of National 5 South at the end of the 1995–96 season London 3 North West reverted to being a tier 7 league. Promotion continued to London 2 North, while relegation was to Herts/Middlesex 1 (formerly Herts/Middlesex).

London 3 North West
Season	No of teams	Champions	Runner-up	Relegated teams	Ref
1996–97	13	Old Merchant Taylors'	Welwyn (Note: 3rd place Barnet also promoted.)	No relegation (Note: No relegation as the league was expanded from 13 to 17 teams.)	
1997–98	17	Harpenden	Hertford	Hackney, Haringey Rhinos	
1998–99	17	London Nigerian	Hertford	Harlequin Amateurs	
1999–00	17	Hertford	Ealing Trailfinders	Multiple teams (Note: The creation of London 4 North West for the following season meant that twelve teams were relegated. Uxbridge and Mill Hill dropped two divisions to Herts/Middlesex 1, while Tring, St Albans, Old Millhillians, Hampstead, Letchworth Garden City, Chiswick and Hemel Hempstead were relegated to the new London 4 North West division. Eleventh place Kingsburians were also supposed to be relegated to the new division but folded at the end of the season and amalgamated with West London RFC.)	
Green backgrounds are promotion places.

=== London 3 North West (2000–2009) ===
London 3 North West continued to be a tier 7 league with promotion to London 2 North. With the introduction of London 4 North West ahead of the 2000–01 season clubs were now relegated to this division instead of Herts/Middlesex 1.

London 3 North West
Season	No of teams	Champions	Runner-up	Relegated teams	Ref
2000–01	10	Hertford	Twickenham	Welwyn	
2001–02	10	Bank of England	Letchworth Garden City	Old Merchant Taylors' Lambs, (Note: The Lambs are Old Merchant Taylors' 2nd team.) Finchley	
2002–03	10	London Scottish	Ealing Trailfinders	Ruislip, Metropolitan Police	
2003–04	9	Civil Service	St Albans	West London	
2004–05	12	St Albans	Bank of England	Cheshunt, Verulamians	
2005–06	12	Woodford	Tring	Fullerians, Barnet Elizabethans	
2006–07	12	Ruislip	Welwyn	Bank of England, Haringey Rhinos	
2007–08	12	Stevenage Town	Imperial Medicals	Vauxhall Motors, Datchworth	
2008–09	12	Harpenden	Hampstead	No relegation due to league restructuring (Note: The division was renamed London Division 2 North West for the following season and along with the national restructuring of the league system by the RFU, it led to changes at all levels.)	
Green backgrounds are promotion places.

=== London 2 North West (2009–present) ===
Nationwide league restructuring by the RFU ahead of the 2009–10 season saw London 3 North West renamed as London 2 North West. It remained at level 7 with promotion to London 1 North (formerly London 2 North) and relegation to London 3 North West (formerly London 4 North West).

London 2 North West
Season	No of teams	Champions	Runner-up	Relegated teams	Ref
2009–10	12	Tabard	Hammersmith & Fulham	Finchley, London Nigerian	
2010–11	12	Hammersmith & Fulham	Harpenden	West London, London New Zealand	
2011–12	12	Old Haberdashers	Stevenage Town	Welwyn, Imperial Medicals	
2012–13	12	Tabard	Hemel Hempstead	Fullerians, Grasshoppers	
2013–14	12	Old Priorians	Twickenham	London Nigerian, UCS Old Boys	
2014–15	12	Harrow	Chiswick	Hemel Hempstead, St Albans	
2015–16	12	Fullerians	Hammersmith & Fulham	Old Merchant Taylors', Staines	
2016–17	12	Old Haberdashers	Honourable Artillery Company (H.A.C.)	Stockwood Park, Welwyn	
2017–18	12	Honourable Artillery Company (H.A.C.)	Hampstead	Tabard, Harrow	
2018–19	11 (Note: League reduced to 11 teams after London Nigerian withdrew from the league.)	Belsize Park	Harpenden	Enfield Ignatians	
2019–20	12	London Welsh	Hammersmith & Fulham	Luton, Welwyn	
2020–21	14	Cancelled due to the COVID-19 pandemic in the United Kingdom.			
2021–22	14	Honourable Artillery Company (H.A.C.)	Letchworth Garden City	No relegation	
Green backgrounds are promotion places.

=== Counties 1 Herts/Middlesex (2022–25) ===
Following league reorganisation, London 2 North West is renamed Counties 1 Herts/Middlesex and continues to be a tier 7 league. Promotion is to Regional 2 Thames and relegation to Counties 2 Herts/Middlesex.

Counties 1 Herts/Middlesex
Season	No of teams	Champions	Runner-up	Relegated team(s)	Ref
2022–23	12	Hemel Hempstead	Grasshoppers	No relegation. Enfield Ignatians (12th)	
2023–24	12	London Scottish Lions	Old Streetonians	Hampstead (11th) and Enfield Ignatians (12th)	
2024–25	12	Brunel University	Cheshunt	Hackney (11th) and Datchworth (12th)	
Green backgrounds are promotion places.

=== Counties 1 Herts (2025– ) ===
The league was renamed and now only contains clubs from Hertfordshire. It continues to be a tier 7 league.The Middlesex clubs were level transferred to the newly re-formed Counties 1 Middlesex. Promotion is to Regional 2 Thames and relegation to Counties 2 Hertfordshire

Counties 1 Hertsfordshire
Season	No of teams	Champions	Runner-up	Relegated team(s)	Ref
2025–26	10				
Green backgrounds are promotion places.

== Promotion play-offs ==
From 2000–01 season to 2018–19 there was a play-off between the runners-up of London 2 North East and London 2 North West for the third and final promotion place to London 1 North. The team with the superior league record had home advantage in the tie. At the end of the 2018–19 season the London 2 North East had ten wins and the and London 2 North West teams had nine and the home team has won promotion on thirteen occasions compared to the away teams six.

London 2 (north-east v north-west) promotion play-off results
Season	Home team	Score	Away team	Venue	Att/Ref
2000–01	Twickenham (NW)	44–8	Rochford Hundred (NE)	Parkfields, Hampton, Greater London	
2001–02	Letchworth Garden City (NW)	31–22	Basildon (NE)	Baldock Road, Letchworth Garden City, Hertfordshire	
2002–03	Ealing Trailfinders (NW)	36–12	Saffron Walden (NE)	Trailfinders Sports Ground, Ealing, London	
2003–04	St Albans (2nd XV) (NW)	5–22	Hadleigh (NE)	Oaklands Land, St Albans, Hertfordshire	
2004–05	Bank of England (NW)	39–0	Romford and Gidea Park (NE)	Bank Lane, Roehampton, Greater London	
2005–06	Tring (NW)	19–5	Diss (NE)	Cow Lane, Tring, Hertfordshire	
2006–07	Welwyn (NW)	19–6	Harlow (NE)	Hobbs Way, Welwyn Garden City, Hertfordshire	
2007–08	Diss (NE)	50–15	Imperial Medicals (NW)	Mackenders, Roydon, Norfolk	
2008–09	Brentwood (NE)	23–15	Hampstead (NW)	King George's Playing Fields, Brentwood, Essex	
2009–10	Hammersmith & Fulham (NW)	22–29	Colchester (NE)	Hurlingham Park, Fulham, London	
2010–11	Braintree (NE)	24–14	Harpenden (NW)	Robbs Wood, Braintree, Essex	300
2011–12	Basildon (NE)	38–13	Stevenage (NW)	Gardiners Close, Basildon, Essex	
2012–13	Hemel Hempstead (NW)	13–16 (aet)	Woodford (NE)	Chaulden Lane, Hemel Hempstead, Hertfordshire	500
2013–14	Twickenham (NW)	44–43	Saffron Walden (NE)	Parkfields, Hampton, Greater London	
2014–15	Diss (NE)	13–16	Chiswick (NW)	Mackenders, Roydon, Norfolk	
2015–16	Sudbury (NE)	22–18	Hammersmith & Fulham (NW)	Whittham Field, Sudbury, Suffolk	
2016–17	Honourable Artillery Company (H.A.C.) (NW)	48–7 (Note: The initial result of the 2016–17 play-off was overturned by the RFU after HAC were found guilty of fielding an ineligible player. South Woodham Ferrers were promoted instead.)	South Woodham Ferrers (NE)	Dukes Meadows, Chiswick, London	
2017–18	Hampstead (NW)	7–37	Sudbury (NE)	Parliament Hill Fields, Highgate, Camden, London	
2018–19	Harpenden (NW)	60–6	Romford and Gidea Park (NE)	Redbourn Lane, Harpenden, Hertfordshire	
2019–20	Cancelled due to COVID-19 pandemic in the United Kingdom. Best ranked runner-up – Hammersmith & Fulham (NW) – promoted instead.				
Green background is the promoted team. NE = London 2 North East (formerly London 3 North East) and NW = London 2 North West (formerly London 3 North West)

== Number of league titles ==
- Hertford (3)
- Tabard (3)
- Harpenden (2)
- Honourable Artillery Company (H.A.C.) (2)
- Old Haberdashers (2)
- Bank of England (1)
- Belsize Park 1)
- Bishop's Stortford (1)
- Brunel University (1)
- Civil Service (1)
- Finchley (1)
- Fullerians (1)
- Hammersmith & Fulham (1)
- Harrow (1)
- Hemel Hemstead (1)
- Letchworth Garden City (1)
- London Nigerian (1)
- London Scottish Lions (1)
- London Welsh (1)
- Old Albanian (1)
- Old Merchant Taylors' (1)
- Old Priorians (1)
- Ruislip (1)
- St Albans (1)
- Staines (1)
- Stevenage Town (1)
- Upper Clapton (1)
- Verulamians (1)
- Woodford (1)

== See also ==
- London & SE Division RFU
- Hertfordshire RFU
- Middlesex RFU
- English rugby union system
- Rugby union in England
