= Counties 2 Hertfordshire =

Level 8 league within the RFU league structure

Counties 2 Herts/Middlesex
- Current season or competition: 2025–26 Counties 2 Herts/Middlesex
- Sport: Rugby union
- Instituted: 2000; 26 years ago (as London 4 North West)
- Number of teams: 12
- Country: England
- Most titles: Old Streetonians (2 titles)
- Website: englandrugby.com

Counties 2 Hertfordshire (formerly Counties 2 Herts/Middlesex and before that London 3 North West) is a level 8 league within the Rugby Football Union (RFU) league structure and is made up of teams predominantly from north-west London and Hertfordshire. Promoted sides move up to Counties 1 Hertfordshire while relegated teams drop to Counties 3 Hertfordshire. Following the RFU's Adult Competition Review, from season 2022–23 it adopted the name Counties 2 Herts/Middlesex (2022–25), however ahead of the 2025–26 season a decision was taken to split out Hertfordshire RFU and Middlesex RFU clubs for the first time, with Middlesex teams moving on a level transfer to Counties 2 Middlesex.

== Teams for 2026–27 ==
Departing were Datchworth (champions) and Royston (runners up) both promoted to Counties 1 Hertfordshire. There was no relegation.

Team	Ground	Capacity	City/Area	Previous season
Chess Valley	Croxley Guild of Sports		Croxley, Hertfordshire	3rd
Harpenden 2XV	Redbourn Lane		Harpenden, Hertfordshire	Promoted from Counties 3 Hertfordshire (3rd)
Hitchin 2XV	King George V Playing Fields		Hitchin, Hertfordshire	Promoted from Counties 3 Hertfordshire (champions)
Letchworth Garden City II	Legends Lane, Baldock Road		Letchworth, Hertfordshire	9th
Luton	Newlands Road		Luton, Bedfordshire	8th
Old Grammarians	Green Dragon Lane		Winchmore Hill, London	Promoted from Counties 3 Hertfordshire (runners-up)
St Albans	Boggymead Springs		St Albans, Hertfordshire	5th
Tabard	Cobden Hill		Radlett, Hertfordshire	6th
Tring II	Pendley Sports Centre		Tring, Hertfordshire	4th
Verulamians	Cotlandswick		London Colney, Hertfordshire	7th

Locations of the 2026–27 Counties 2 Hertfordshire teams

== Teams for 2025–26 ==
This was the first season with the league containing only Hertfordshire RFU clubs.

Departing were Hampstead (champions), Wasps FC (runners up), Saracens Amateurs (3rd) and UCS Old Boys (5th) all promoted to Counties 1 Middlesex.

Also leaving on a level transfer to Counties 2 Middlesex were Harrow (4th), Enfield Ignatians (7th), Barnet Elizabethans (10th) and Old Millhillians (11th).

Old Albanian III were originally due to participate in the league but withdrew before the season began.

Team	Ground	Capacity	City/Area	Previous season
Chess Valley	Croxley Guild of Sports		Croxley, Hertfordshire	Promoted from Counties 3 Herts/Middlesex (3rd)
Datchworth	Datchworth Sports Club		Datchworth, Hertfordshire	Relegated from Counties 1 Herts/Middlesex (12th)
Letchworth Garden City II	Legends Lane, Baldock Road		Letchworth, Hertfordshire	New entry
Luton	Newlands Road		Luton, Bedfordshire	Promoted from Counties 3 Midlands East (South) (3rd)
Royston	The Heath Sports Centre		Royston, Hertfordshire	Promoted from Counties 3 Herts/Middlesex (champions)
St Albans	Boggymead Springs		St Albans, Hertfordshire	8th
Tabard	Cobden Hill		Radlett, Hertfordshire	6th
Tring II	Pendley Sports Centre		Tring, Hertfordshire	Level transfer from Counties 2 Berks/Bucks & Oxon (North) (5th)
Verulamians	Cotlandswick		London Colney, Hertfordshire	9th

Locations of the 2025–26 Counties 2 Hertfordshire teams

== Teams for 2024–25 ==
Departing were Brunel University and Ealing Trailfinders 1871, both promoted to Counties 1 Herts/Middlesex. Hendon were relegated to Counties 3 Herts/Middlesex.

Joining were Enfield Ignatians and Hampstead, both relegated from Counties 1 Herts/Middlesex together with Verulamians and UCS Old Boys, both promoted from Counties 3 Herts/Middlesex.

With three teams departing and four joining, the league ran with eleven sides.

Team	Ground	Capacity	City/Area	Previous season
Barnet Elizabethans	Byng Road		Chipping Barnet, London	8th
Enfield Ignatians	Donkey Lane		Enfield, London, London	Relegated from Counties 1 Herts/Middlesex
Hampstead	Parliament Hill Fields		Highgate, London	Relegated from Counties 1 Herts/Middlesex
Harrow	Grove Field		Stanmore, London	5th
Old Millhillians	Mill Hill School		Mill Hill, London	7th
Saracens Amateurs	Bramley Sports Ground		Cockfosters, London	4th
St Albans	Boggymead Springs		St Albans, Hertfordshire	9th
Tabard	Cobden Hill		Radlett, Hertfordshire	6th
UCS Old Boys	UCS Sports Ground		Cricklewood, London	Promoted from Counties 3 Herts/Middlesex (champions)
Verulamians	Cotlandswick		London Colney, Hertfordshire	Promoted from Counties 3 Herts/Middlesex (runners-up)
Wasps FC	Twyford Avenue Sports Ground		Acton, London	3rd

Locations of the 2024–25 Counties 2 Herts/Middlesex teams in Herts
Locations of the 2024–25 Counties 2 Herts/Middlesex teams in London

== Teams for 2023–24 ==
Departing were Cheshunt and London Scottish Lions, both promoted to Counties 1 Herts/Middlesex. Royston were relegated to Counties 3 Herts/Middlesex.

Joining were Brunel University and Old Millhillians, both promoted from Counties 3 Herts/Middlesex.

With three teams departing and two joining, the league ran with ten sides.

Team	Ground	Capacity	City/Area	Previous season
Barnet Elizabethans	Byng Road		Chipping Barnet, London	9th
Brunel University	Brunel University Sports Park		Uxbridge, London	Promoted from Counties 3 Herts/Middlesex (champions)
Ealing Trailfinders 1871	Trailfinders Sports Ground	4,000	West Ealing, London	3rd
Harrow	Grove Field		Stanmore, London	10th
Hendon	Copthall Playing Fields		Hendon, London	7th
Old Millhillians	Mill Hill School		Mill Hill, London	Promoted from Counties 3 Herts/Middlesex (runners-up)
Saracens Amateurs	Bramley Sports Ground		Cockfosters, London	4th
St Albans	Boggymead Springs		St Albans, Hertfordshire	8th
Tabard	Cobden Hill		Radlett, Hertfordshire	6th
Wasps FC	Twyford Avenue Sports Ground		Acton, London	5th

Locations of the 2023–24 Counties 2 Herts/Middlesex teams in Herts
Locations of the 2023–24 Counties 2 Herts/Middlesex teams in London

== Teams for 2022–23 ==
This was the first season following the RFU Adult Competition Review with the league adopting its new name of Counties 2 Herts/Middlesex.

Returning were six of the ten teams from the previous season supplemented by the top five from Herts/Middlesex 1.

Departing were the top three sides Finchley, Welwyn and Hitchin, all promoted to Counties 1 Herts/Middlesex. Finsbury Park, 8th in 2021–22, did not return for the new season instead dropping to Middlesex RFU Merit 2.

Team	Ground	Capacity	City/Area	Previous season
Barnet Elizabethans	Byng Road		Chipping Barnet, London	Promoted from Herts/Middlesex 1 (runners-up)
Cheshunt	Rosedale Sports Club		Cheshunt, Hertfordshire	4th
Ealing Trailfinders 1871	Trailfinders Sports Ground	4,000	West Ealing, London	Promoted from Herts/Middlesex 1 (3rd)
Harrow	Grove Field		Stanmore, London	7th
Hendon	Copthall Playing Fields		Hendon, London	5th
London Scottish Lions	King's House Sports Ground		Chiswick, London	Promoted from Herts/Middlesex 1 (champions)
Royston	The Heath Sports Centre		Royston, Hertfordshire	9th
Saracens Amateurs	Bramley Sports Ground		Cockfosters, London	Promoted from Herts/Middlesex 1 (5th)
St Albans	Boggymead Springs		St Albans, Hertfordshire	6th
Tabard	Cobden Hill		Radlett, Hertfordshire	10th
Wasps FC	Twyford Avenue Sports Ground		Acton, London	Promoted from Herts/Middlesex 1 (4th)

Locations of the 2022–23 Counties 2 Herts/Middlesex teams in Herts
Locations of the 2022–23 Counties 2 Herts/Middlesex teams in London

== Teams for 2021–22 ==
The teams competing in 2021–22 achieved their places in the league based on performances in 2019–20, the 'previous season' column in the table below refers to that season not 2020–21.

Stevenage Town, 3rd in 2019–20, did not return for the new season instead dropping to Middlesex RFU Merit 3. This meant the league started with eleven clubs competing.

Old Merchant Taylors', who finished 9th in 2019–20, withdrew from the league in November 2021, consequently it was completed with ten teams.

Team	Ground	Capacity	City/Area	Previous season
Cheshunt	Rosedale Sports Club		Cheshunt, Hertfordshire	4th
Finchley	Summers Lane	1,000	Finchley, London	10th
Finsbury Park	Downhills Park		West Green, London	5th
Harrow	Grove Field		Stanmore, London	12th (not relegated to Herts/Middlesex 1) (Note: Kilburn Cosmos, who finished 11th in L3NW for the 2019–20 season took the place of Harrow RFC in Herts/Middlesex 1 for season 2021–22.)
Hendon	Copthall Playing Fields		Hendon, London	Promoted from Herts/Middlesex 1 (champions)
Hitchin	King George V Playing Fields		Hitchin, Hertfordshire	6th
Royston	The Heath Sports Centre		Royston, Hertfordshire	8th
St Albans	Boggymead Springs		St Albans, Hertfordshire	Promoted from Herts/Middlesex 1 (runners-up)
Tabard	Cobden Hill		Radlett, Hertfordshire	7th
Welwyn	Hobbs Way		Welwyn Garden City, Hertfordshire	Relegated from London 2 North West (11th)

Locations of the 2021–22 London 3 North West teams in Herts
Location of 2021–22 London 3 North West teams in London

== Season 2020–21 ==
On 30 October the RFU announced that a decision had been taken to cancel Adult Competitive Leagues (National League 1 and below) for the 2020/21 season meaning London 3 North West was not contested.

== Participating clubs 2019–20 ==
Locations of the 2019–20 London 3 North West teams in Herts
Location of 2019–20 London 3 North West teams in London

Team	Ground	Capacity	City/Area	Previous season
Cheshunt	Rosedale Sports Club		Cheshunt, Hertfordshire	8th
Enfield Ignatians	Donkey Lane		Enfield Town, London	Relegated from London 2 NW (11th)
Finchley	Summers Lane	1,000	Finchley, London	10th
Finsbury Park	Downhills Park		West Green, London	Promoted from Herts/Middlesex 1 (runners up)
Harrow	Grove Field		Stanmore, London	7th
Hitchin	King George V Playing Fields		Hitchin, Hertfordshire	Promoted from Herts/Middlesex 1 (champions)
Kilburn Cosmos	Gladstone Park		Kilburn, London	9th
Old Merchant Taylors'	War Memorial Sports Ground		Northwood, London	6th
Old Streetonians	Haggerston Park		Shoreditch, London	4th
Royston	The Heath Sports Centre		Royston, Hertfordshire	11th (not relegated)
Stevenage Town	North Road		Stevenage, Hertfordshire	3rd
Tabard	Cobden Hill		Radlett, Hertfordshire	5th

== Participating clubs 2018–19 ==
Locations of the 2018–19 London 3 North West teams
Location of 2018–19 London 3 North West clubs in London

Team	Ground	Capacity	City/Area	Previous season
Cheshunt	Rosedale Sports Club		Cheshunt, Hertfordshire	10th
Datchworth	Datchworth Sports Club		Datchworth, Hertfordshire	8th
Finchley	Summers Lane	1,000	Finchley, London	7th
Harrow	Grove Field		Stanmore, London	Relegated from London 2 NW (11th)
Kilburn Cosmos	Gladstone Park		Kilburn, London	6th
London Welsh	Old Deer Park	5,850 (1,000 seats)	Richmond, London	Promoted from Herts/Middlesex 1 (champions)
Old Merchant Taylors'	War Memorial Sports Ground		Northwood, London	9th
Old Streetonians	Haggerston Park		Shoreditch, London	4th
Royston	The Heath Sports Centre		Royston, Hertfordshire	Promoted from Herts/Middlesex 1 (runners up)
Stevenage Town	North Road		Stevenage, Hertfordshire	3rd
Tabard	Cobden Hill		Radlett, Hertfordshire	Relegated from London 2 NW (12th)
Verulamians	Cotlandswick		London Colney, Hertfordshire	5th

== Participating clubs 2017–18 ==
Locations of the 2017–18 London 3 North West teams
Location of 2017–18 London 3 North West clubs in London

Team	Ground	Capacity	City/Area	Previous season
Cheshunt	Rosedale Sports Club		Cheshunt, Hertfordshire	10th
Datchworth	Datchworth Sports Club		Datchworth, Hertfordshire	6th
Finchley	Summers Lane	1,000	Finchley, London	11th (not relegated)
Grasshoppers	MacFarlane Lane		Isleworth, London	4th
Hitchin	King George V Playing Fields		Hitchin, Hertfordshire	8th
Kilburn Cosmos	Gladstone Park		Kilburn, London	5th
Old Merchant Taylors'	War Memorial Sports Ground		Northwood, London	9th
Old Streetonians	Haggerston Park		Shoreditch, London	Promoted from Herts/Middlesex 1 (runners up)
St Albans	Boggymead Springs		St Albans, Hertfordshire	7th
Stevenage Town	North Road		Stevenage, Hertfordshire	3rd
Verulamians	Cotlandswick		London Colney, St Albans, Hertfordshire	Promoted from Herts/Middlesex 1 (champions)
Welwyn	Hobbs Way		Welwyn Garden City, Hertfordshire	Relegated from London 2 North West (11th)

== Participating clubs 2016–17 ==
- Cheshunt (promoted from Herts/Middlesex 1)
- Datchworth
- Finchley
- Grasshoppers
- Hackney
- Hemel Hempstead
- Hitchin
- Kilburn Cosmos (promoted from Herts/Middlesex 1)
- Old Merchant Taylors' (relegated from London 2 North West)
- St Albans
- Staines (relegated from London 2 North West)
- Stevenge Town

=== Final league table ===
2016–17 London 3 North West
Pos	Team	Pld	W	D	L	PF	PA	PD	TB	LB	Pts	Qualification
1	Hackney (C)	22	22	0	0	859	245	+614	20	0	108	Promoted
2	Hemel Hempstead	22	18	0	4	800	305	+495	16	2	90	Promoted
3	Stevenage	22	15	0	7	716	472	+244	18	5	83	
4	Grasshoppers	22	13	1	8	564	515	+49	11	2	67	
5	Kilburn Cosmos	22	9	2	11	550	560	−10	10	4	54	
6	Datchworth	22	10	0	12	458	633	−175	7	3	50	
7	St Albans	22	8	1	13	463	590	−127	10	3	47	
8	Hitchin	22	9	0	13	497	639	−142	9	1	46	
9	Old Merchant Taylors'	22	9	0	13	475	588	−113	8	1	45	
10	Cheshunt	22	7	2	13	463	558	−95	8	3	43	
11	Finchley	22	7	0	15	512	563	−51	8	5	41	Relegated
12	Staines	22	2	0	20	310	999	−689	4	0	12	Relegated

Updated to match(es) played on 10 April 2017. Source: 2016-17
Rules for classification: If teams are level at any stage, tiebreakers are applied in the following order:
1. Number of matches won
2. Difference between points for and against
3. Total number of points for
4. Aggregate number of points scored in matches between tied teams
5. Number of matches won excluding the first match, then the second and so on until the tie is settled
  (C) Champion

== Participating clubs 2015–16 ==
- Belsize Park
- Datchworth
- Finchley
- Grasshoppers
- Hackney
- Hemel Hempstead (relegated from London 2 North West)
- Hitchin
- London Nigerian (promoted from Herts/Middlesex 1)
- Old Actonians (promoted from Herts/Middlesex 1)
- St Albans (relegated from London 2 North West)
- Stevenage Town
- Wasps

== Participating clubs 2014–15 ==
- Belsize Park (promoted from Herts/Middlesex 1)
- Datchworth
- Finchley
- Fullerians
- Grasshoppers
- Hackney (promoted from Herts/Middlesex 1)
- Hitchin
- Old Streetonians
- Stevenage Town
- UCS Old Boys (relegated from London 2 North West)
- Wasps
- Welwyn

== Participating clubs 2013–14 ==
- Datchworth
- Finchley
- Fullerians (relegated from London 2 North West)
- Grasshoppers (relegated from London 2 North West)
- Harrow (promoted from Herts/Middlesex 1)
- Hitchin
- London New Zealand
- Old Merchant Taylors' (promoted from Herts/Middlesex 1)
- Old Streetonians (relegated from London 2 North East)
- Stevenage Town (relegated from London 2 North East)
- Wasps
- Welwyn

== Participating clubs 2012–13 ==
- Barnet Elizabethans
- Cheshunt
- Datchworth
- Finchley
- Haringey Rhinos
- Hitchin
- Imperial Medicals
- London New Zealand
- Old Priorians
- Twickenham
- Wasps
- Welwyn

== Participating clubs 2009–10 ==
- Bank of England
- Barnet Elizabethans
- Cheshunt
- Datchworth
- Fullerians
- Haringey Rhinos
- Hitchin
- Old Ashmoleans
- Old Hamptonians
- Old Streetonians
- West London

== Original teams ==
When this division was introduced in 2000 (as London 4 North West) it contained the following teams:

- Bank Of England - promoted from Herts/Middlesex 1 (champions)
- Chiswick - relegated from London 3 North West (9th)
- Fullerians - relegated from London 3 North West (7th)
- Grasshoppers - relegated from London 3 North West (6th)
- Hampstead - relegated from London 3 North West (12th)
- Hemel Hempstead - relegated from London 3 North West (8th)
- Letchworth Garden City - relegated from London 3 North West (10th)
- London New Zealand - promoted from Herts/Middlesex 1 (runners up)
- Old Millhillians - relegated from London 3 North West (13th)
- St Albans - relegated from London 3 North West (14th)
- Tring - relegated from London 3 North West (15th)

== London 3 North West honours ==
=== London 4 North West (2000–2009) ===
Originally known as London 4 North West, this division was a tier 8 league with promotion up to London 3 North West and relegation down to Herts/Middlesex 1.

London 4 North West
Season	No of teams	Champions	Runners–up	Relegated Teams
2000–01	11	Letchworth Garden City	Bank Of England	Old Millhillians, Tring
2001–02	10	London Scottish	Fullerians	Hemel Hempstead, Chiswick, Hampstead
2002–03	10	Civil Service	St Albans	No relegation
2003–04	10	Welwyn	Ruislip	Old Merchant Taylors' Lambs (Note: The Lambs were Old Merchant Taylors' 2nd team.)
2004–05	9	Tring	Stevenage Town	Finchley
2005–06	10	London New Zealand	Datchworth	West London, Cheshunt
2006–07	10	Hammersmith & Fulham	UCS Old Boys	Verulamians, Hitchin
2007–08	10	Finchley	Grasshoppers	Harrow
2008–09	11	Chiswick	Hemel Hempstead	No relegation
Green backgrounds are promotion places.

=== London 3 North West (2009–present) ===
League restructuring by the RFU ahead of the 2009–10 season saw London 4 North East renamed as London 3 North West. Remaining as a tier 8 league promotion was to London 2 North West (formerly London 3 North West), while relegation continued to Herts/Middlesex 1.

London 3 North West
Season	No of teams	Champions	Runners–up	Relegated Teams
2009–10	11	Old Streetonians	West London	Old Hamptonians
2010–11	12	Old Haberdashers	Fullerians	Old Ashmoleans, Wasps Amateurs
2011–12	12	H.A.C.	London Nigerian	London Welsh Amateur, Bank Of England, West London
2012–13	12	Old Priorians	Twickenham	Haringey Rhinos, Cheshunt, Imperial Medicals
2013–14	12	Harrow	Old Merchant Taylors'	No relegation
2014–15	12	Fullerians	Welwyn	Old Streetonians, UCS Old Boys
2015–16	12	London Nigerian	Belsize Park	Wasps, Old Actonians
2016–17	12	Hackney	Hemel Hempstead	Staines (Note: Only 1 team relegated this season.)
2017–18	12	Grasshoppers	Welwyn	Hitchin, St Albans
2018–19	12	London Welsh	Datchworth	Verulamians (Note: Only 1 team relegated this season.)
2019–20	12	Old Streetonians	Enfield Ignatians	Harrow
2020–21	12			
Green backgrounds are promotion places.

== Number of league titles ==
- Old Streetonians (2)
- Chiswick (1)
- Civil Service (1)
- Finchley (1)
- Fullerians (1)
- Grasshoppers (1)
- Hackney (1)
- Hammersmith & Fulham (1)
- Harrow (1)
- H.A.C. (1)
- Letchworth Garden City (1)
- London New Zealand (1)
- London Nigerian (1)
- London Scottish (1)
- London Welsh (1)
- Old Haberdashers (1)
- Old Priorians (1)
- Tring (1)
- Welwyn (1)

== See also ==
- Hertfordshire RFU
- Middlesex RFU
- English rugby union system
- Rugby union in England
