= Allianz Stadium =

Allianz Stadium may refer to:

- Juventus Stadium, association football stadium in Turin, Italy, known as Allianz Stadium for sponsorship reasons since July 2017
- Sydney Football Stadium (2022) in Sydney, Australia, known as Allianz Stadium for sponsorship reasons from its reopening in September 2022
- Sydney Football Stadium (1988), from February 2012 until its October 2018 closure
- Twickenham Stadium, a rugby stadium in Twickenham, London, known as Allianz Stadium for sponsorship reasons from September 2024

== See also ==
- Allianz Arena, an association football stadium in Munich, Germany
- Allianz Field, an association football stadium in Saint Paul, Minnesota, U.S.
- Allianz Park, a rugby and athletics stadium in London, England now known as Barnet Copthall
- Allianz Parque, an association football stadium in São Paulo, Brazil
- Allianz Riviera, a multisport stadium in Nice, France
- Allianz Stadion, an association stadium in Vienna, Austria
