= Tabard RFC =

English rugby union club, based in Radlett, Hertfordshire

(England) Tabard
- Full name: Tabard Rugby Football Club
- Union: Hertfordshire Rugby Football Union
- Location: Radlett, Hertfordshire, England
- Ground: Cobden Hill
- League: London 3 North West
- 2019–20: 7th

Official website
- tabardrfc.rfu.club

Tabard Rugby Football Club is a rugby union club located in Radlett, Hertfordshire. The first XV currently play in London 3 North West, although the club spent more than a decade playing in the national divisions.

== League history ==
When league rugby was created, Tabard was placed in London 2 North and in the early 1990s, Tabard won consecutive promotions, finding themselves in the newly created Courage League Division 5 in 1993-94, playing in the South division throughout its three years and were transferred to Courage League 4 South following the 1996 reorganisation, which became National League 2 South the following season. They remained in the fourth tier until relegation in 2004-05. The club has played in the regional London divisions ever since.

Tabard has also won the Hertfordshire Presidents' Cup 11 times in 21 seasons, the most recent being in 2002-03.

== Club honours ==
- Hertfordshire Presidents' Cup winners (11): 1983, 1988, 1990, 1992, 1993, 1994, 1995, 2000, 2001, 2002, 2003
- London 2 North West champions (3): 1989–90, 2009–10, 2012–13
- London 2 North champions: 1991–92
- London 1 champions: 1992–93
- Hertfordshire Presidents' Tankard winners: 2012–13
