= Finchley RFC =

English rugby union club, based in London

(England) Finchley RFC
- Full name: Finchley Rugby Football Club Ltd
- Union: Middlesex RFU
- Nickname(s): Finches, Hawks
- Founded: 1925; 101 years ago
- Location: Finchley, Barnet, London, England
- Ground: Summers Lane (Capacity: 1,000)
- League: Counties 1 Middlesex
- 2025–26: 1st (lpromoted to Regional 2 Anglia)
Team kit

Official website
- www.pitchero.com/clubs/finchley/

Finchley Rugby Football Club is a rugby union club based in north London, England. Finchley RFC currently have four senior men's teams and play their matches in Finchley.

== History ==
The club was founded in its present form on Monday 21 December 1925 under the chairmanship of A F Carris, who was elected President, with R A "Johnny" Johnson as Secretary. Although, there are records showing that Finchley Rugby Club originated in 1875. The club's original colours were sky blue and thin black hoops, until 1930 when they changed to a broad scarlet and grey hoop, these remained until 1947 when the club adopted its present scarlet and white hoops. In 1929 the club moved to its present ground in Summers Lane, in 1931 the 500 seat stand was completed and the changing rooms and clubhouse were housed underneath. At the outbreak of war the club closed until 1946, on its re-opening poplar trees were planted on the east side of the ground in 1948 to commemorate the loss of club members during the Second World War.

In July 2006 the club was registered as a Community Amateur Sports Club.

== Present day ==
Finchley RFC currently field three senior Men XV squads and one Vets Hawks XV, training takes place on Tuesday and Thursday evenings during the season at the club's ground in Summers Lane, Finchley. Its Mini and Youth section is one of the strongest in North London, with teams from U6s-U20s – training takes place on Sunday mornings.

== Honours ==
- Middlesex 1 champions (2): 1987–88, 2025–26
- Middlesex Senior Cup winners: 1988
- London 3 North West champion: 1988–89
- Herts/Middlesex 1 champions: 2005-06
- London 4 North West champions: 2007–08
- Middlesex Senior Bowl winners (3): 2016, 2017, 2018

== See also ==
- Finchley
- Rugby union in London
