= Hackney RFC =

(England) Hackney RFC
- Full name: Hackney Rugby Football Club
- Union: Middlesex RFU
- Nickname: The Griffins
- Founded: 1965; 61 years ago
- Location: Upper Clapton, Hackney, London, England
- Ground: Spring Hill Recreation Ground
- Chairman: Matt Hanton
- President: Shaun Rooke
- Coach(es): Amy Turner, Steve Wagstaff, Morgan Whitlock, Damien Bouvier
- Captain(s): Laurence Mills, Beth Patterson, Keiran Murray, Darren Griffin
- League: Counties 1 Herts/Middlesex
- 2024–25: 11th (relegated to Counties 2 Middlesex

Official website
- hackneyrfc.co.uk

Hackney Rugby Football Club is a rugby club based in Hackney, London, England. Hackney RFC has five senior teams. Junior teams from under-12 to under-18’s and minis from 6 to aged 11. The senior teams are currently playing in Counties 2 Middlesex (a tier 8 league in the English rugby union system) following relegation from Counties 1 Herts/Middlesex in season 2024–25.

== Formation ==
The club was formed in 1965 for former pupils of Woodberry Down Comprehensive School. The newly created Old Griffins Rugby Football Club adopted the school's colours, motto, and the Griffin from the school crest. Despite its affiliation, the Old Griffins was an open club from its early days, though it only changed its name to Hackney RFC when it entered into negotiations with Hackney Council over the vacant Spring Hill Recreation Ground.

The 1st XV and Ladies 1st XV plays in a quartered kit, with the original three colours from the Old Griffins combined with a fourth colour (green) gained from partnering with a French club. The other sides play in variations of the original Old Griffins colours

== Clubhouse fire ==
The prospects for Hackney RFC were severely damaged when its clubhouse was destroyed by a fire in April 1999. At the beginning of that season, the club fielded four sides on a regular basis with the 1st XV competing in London 3 (Level 7). Without facilities, the club lost a large part of its playing base. The club plummeted down through the leagues and in 2004 was playing in Herts/Middlesex North 3 (Level 11), fulfilling its fixtures on an intermittent basis and often playing without a full complement of 15 players. The club had no changing rooms and used the facilities of the Lea Valley Rowing Club. Post-match hospitality was provided by The Swan Public House.

== Recent history ==
The club managed to reverse its decline through good recruitment, player enthusiasm and the unwavering commitment of the club's committee. The 2004–05 and 2005–06 season saw the club fulfill every fixture.

Building on this progress, the club won Herts/Middlesex North 3 but was not promoted to Level 10 due to a restructure of the lower leagues. The club demonstrated that it belonged at a higher level by winning promotion again in the 2008–09 season. This season also saw the launch of a 2nd XV side, nicknamed the Hackney Gargoyles. The club's rugby sevens side also finished runner-up in the Middlesex Sevens Jug Competition. The following year, the club fielded a 3rd XV side, now known as the Gogs, for the first time in twelve years. The 2nd and 3rd teams progressed quickly up the Merit league structure with the Gargoyles reaching Merit 1 in 2015. Following a further league championship for the 1st XV in 2014, the club enjoyed a historic season in 2016–17 with the 1st XV going the entire season unbeaten and dropping just one bonus point alongside the 2nd XV becoming league champions and the 3rd XV winning the cup.

The Hackney Ladies side were formed in 2010 and soon joined the RFU women's league, gaining promotion in 2013. They continue to expand rapidly and have increased their membership dramatically over the past few years.

Hackney RFC now uses the Spring Hill Recreation Ground changing rooms as its base following its reopening in 2011, though it lost the use of The Swan Public house when the owners sold the premises to a local synagogue. The club now hosts opposition teams at the Lea Rowing Club bar, Spring Hill, London E5 9BL.

== Guinness Club Together ==
In 2009 Hackney RFC won the Guinness Club Together competition, a free programme aimed at supporting grassroots rugby clubs across the UK. Hackney was awarded the title having doubled its playing membership over the previous year despite its lack of facilities. Hackney travelled to Twickenham on May 16, 2009. Starting with a training session with legendary coach Shaun Edwards (of London Wasps, Wales and The British and Irish Lions) the teams were driven to HQ and ran out onto the hallowed turf as a curtain raiser for the Guinness Premiership final. The Griffins beat the Gargoyles by 12 – 5.

== Honours ==
- Middlesex 2 champions: 1989–90
- Middlesex 1 champions: 1995–96
- Herts/Middlesex 3 North champions: 2007–08
- Middlesex Senior Vase winners: 2012
- Herts/Middlesex 1 champions: 2013–14
- London 3 North West champions: 2016–17

== Tours ==
Hackney RFC have recently toured to Madrid, Munich, Budapest, Malta, Portugal, Bulgaria, Romania, Croatia, Czech Republic and France playing against RFC Chaminade, Studentenstadt Munchen RFC, Medvek RFC, Valletta Lions RFC, Sofia RFC, Makarska RFC and AMK Montpellier respectively.
