= John Wackett =

England international rugby union player

- Full name: John Arthur Sibley Wackett
- Born: 27 September 1930 Hatfield, England
- Died: 24 February 2024 (aged 93) St Albans, England
- Height: 5 ft 9 in (175 cm)

Rugby union career
- Position: Hooker
International career
Years	Team	Apps	(Points)
1959	England	2	(0)

John Arthur Sibley Wackett (27 September 1930 – 24 February 2024) was an English international rugby union player.

Born in Hatfield, Hertfordshire, Wackett was educated at Welwyn Garden City Grammar and played his early career for Welwyn RFC, before moving on to London club Rosslyn Park.

Wackett made 37 appearances for Hertfordshire and gained two England caps as a hooker in the 1959 Five Nations Championship, against Wales in Cardiff and Ireland in Dublin.

== See also ==
- List of England national rugby union players
