= Harrow RFC =

English rugby union club

(England) Harrow RFC
- Full name: Harrow Rugby Football Club
- Union: Middlesex RFU
- Founded: 1891; 135 years ago
- Location: Stanmore, Harrow, London, England
- Ground: Grove Field
- Chairman: Andrew Smart
- Coach: John Porter-Griffiths
- Captain: 1st Team - Will Beech
- League: London Counties 2 Herts/Middlesex
- 2023-24: 5th
Team kit

Official website
- www.harrowrugby.com

Harrow RFC are an English rugby union club that are based in Stanmore in London. They currently play in London Counties 2 Herts/Middlesex - a league at tier 8 of the English rugby union system

== History/Background ==
Founded in 1891, Harrow RFC has been based at Grove Field, Wood Lane, Stanmore, since 1953. It draws members and players from the Harrow, Pinner, Edgware, Bushey and Watford areas.

Harrow RFC is a Partner Club with Saracens. Players enjoy close contact including training with some of the game's leading players.

Harrow RFC has 15 teams competing in all age groups from Under 7 to Veterans. The Harrow 1st XV plays in the RFU London & SE Division in the London North West 3 Division.

Harrow RFC promotes high standards of safety, conduct, and coaching. As an all-volunteer club, it has achieved the highest level of recognition awarded to sports clubs in the United Kingdom.

Sponsors of Harrow RFC receive recognition from the 300+ players, over 1000 members, supporters and parents and visiting teams throughout the 9 month rugby season as well as the benefit of supporting one of the community sports clubs in the region.

== Club Honours ==
- Herts/Middlesex 2 champions (2): 1996–97, 2011–12
- Herts/Middlesex 4 champions: 2009–10
- Herts/Middlesex 3 champions: 2010–11
- Middlesex Senior Vase winners (2): 2011, 2013
- Herts/Middlesex 1 champions: 2012–13
- London 3 North West champions: 2013–14
- London 2 North West champions: 2014–15

== Kit ==
Harrow plays in a blue and white, horizontally striped top. With blue shorts, and blue and white socks.

== See also ==
- Rugby Union
