= London 2 North =

English rugby union league

London 2 North, also known as Powergen London 2 North league, was a Tier 6 English Rugby Union League. It is one of two London-area leagues at this level (the other being London 2 South).
