= Welwyn RFC =

English rugby union club, based in Welwyn Garden City, Hertfordshire

Welwyn
- Full name: Welwyn Rugby Football Club
- Union: Hertfordshire RFU
- Founded: 1931; 95 years ago As Welwyn (East)
- Location: Welwyn Garden City, Hertfordshire
- Ground: Hobbs Way
- League: Counties 1 Hertfordshire
- 2024–25: 7th Team Kit

Official website
- www.welwynrugby.co.uk

Welwyn Rugby Football Club (commonly abbreviated as Welwyn RFC) is an English rugby union club playing in Counties 1 Hertfordshire following their promotion from London 3 North West as runner-up at the end of the 2017–18 season.

== History ==
The club was formed in 1931 as Welwyn (East), after a number of Welsh from the valleys and Scots from the border woollen mills arrived in town to work in the local hosiery factory or in factories such as Murphy Radio, where they formed a rugby club and played on various pitches on the east side of town. The first president was a retired Irish army officer, Major C. D. Ross. Welwyn (East) was the second rugby club in Welwyn Garden City, after Mid Herts, which was formed in the mid-1920s and composed mainly of players from the west side of town. They had a pitch at Handside Lane but no clubhouse, only a small changing hut with a crude bath. In 1938, Welwyn (East) moved to share pitches with Mid Herts at Handside Lane.

During World War II both clubs closed down and, following the war, only Welwyn (East) restarted, and was renamed Welwyn RFC. They remained at Handside Lane, which still had no clubhouse, and as a result, all entertaining was carried out at local pubs. In 1952, a hut was purchased from a local chicken hatchery for £300 and dismantled, moved across town and re-erected by a team of players during the summer.

A further wooden building was presented by ICI in 1959 and again fitted out by players and committee. The club continued to grow until the current clubhouse was built in 1973, at a cost of £30,000, in which changing and social facilities were under the same roof for the first time. In 1996, the clubhouse was extended with the aid of a National Lottery grant.

In the first 30 years of the club's life there were several changes in the source of players. For the first 10 years the Welsh and Scots were predominant, but the Irish, mainly due to ICI, provided the main source of players for the next 20 years. Between 1931 and 1960, out of 20 captains, 17 were Welsh, Scots or Irish, while between 1950 and 1970 out of 15, 10 were from ICI.

=== Senior sides ===
In Hertfordshire, the President's Cup (County Cup) was introduced in 1971. Welwyn has reached the last eight on several occasions but the best performance was in 1988 when they lost narrowly to Cheshunt in the semi-final.

In the Herts Merit Table, introduced in 1980, Welwyn was runners up in 1997. In 1989, Welwyn was promoted into London NW3 as Champions of Herts 1 having beaten Barnet in a title decider. 1995–96 saw the club finish fourth in London League 3 NW. 1996–97 saw the club win London 3 NW, defeating Barnet in the last match of the season, when whichever club had won gained promotion. Promotion to London 2 North meant more travelling, e.g., to Diss, Great Yarmouth and Ipswich. At that time there were 17 teams playing each other in this league. Welwyn performed well at this level, finishing in fourth position in its first season. Soon after, the RFU reorganized all leagues to have a maximum of twelve teams playing home and away fixtures, as a result, London 2 North had to be reorganized. Despite finishing in 9th position out of seventeen teams at the end of the season Welwyn was placed back in London 3 North West. In 2001, Welwyn were relegated to London 4 North West.

The club regained promotion to London NW 3 in April 2003 and reached the quarter-final of the National Vase Competition in the same season with a young team. In season 2004–2005 Welwyn finished in fourth position and the club regained its place in London 2 North by winning promotion at the end of the 2006–7 season.

=== Mini/Junior section ===
The Mini/Junior section of the club was created in 1973 and now has in excess of 400 players ranging from the age of 6 upwards. They host many matches at home on Sunday mornings and have fixtures throughout the region. At the youngest age groups the teams are mixed, whilst there are separate boys' and girls' teams from secondary age upwards. The two girls' teams have won regional and national competitions.

== Honours ==
1st team

- Hertfordshire Sevens Cup winners (2): 1971, 1978
- Hertfordshire 1 champions: 1988–89
- Hertfordshire Sevens Plate winners (4): 1989, 1992, 1994, 1997
- London Division 4 North West champions: 2003–04
- London 2 (north-east v north-west) promotion play–off winner: 2006–07
- Hertfordshire Presidents' Tankard winners (2): 2011, 2015

2nd team

- Hertford RFC Floodlit Cup winners (3): 1993, 1994, 1995

Colts

- Hertfordshire Colts Cup winners: 1996

== Notable former players ==
- Steve Bates – London Wasps, England (1989; 1 cap)
- Hannah Botterman - England Women
- Thomas Jankowski – Poland
- John Wackett – England (1959; 2 caps)
- Joe Worsley MBE – London Wasps (1993–2011; 273 matches), England (1999–2011; 78 caps)
