= Chess Valley RFC =

English rugby union club, based in Croxley Green, Hertfordshire

Coordinates: 51°38′58″N 0°27′9″W

(England) ChessValley RFC
- Full name: Chess Valley Rugby Football Club
- Union: Hertfordshire RFU
- Nickname: The Valley
- Founded: 1996; 30 years ago
- Location: Croxley Green, Hertfordshire, England
- Ground: Croxley Guild of Sport
- Chairman: Doug Wotherspoon
- President: Mike Atkins
- Coach: Brian Reilly
- Captain: Scott Brooks (Club)
- League: Counties 2 Hertfordshire

Official website
- chessvalleyrfc.com

Chess Valley RFC is a rugby union club originally from Rickmansworth but now based in Croxley Green, Hertfordshire. It is a member of the Hertfordshire RFU and the Rugby Football Union. It is a community club and fields adult Men's, Youth and Minis sides

== Adult Rugby ==
The senior men's section of the club fields two sides.

For the 2026/2027 season the 1st XV are playing in Counties 2 Hertfordshire. The 2nd XV are playing in the Merit Leagues.

Games take place on Saturday afternoons with training being held on Tuesday evenings.

== Women's Rugby ==
The 2009/2010 season saw Chess Valley put together its first senior Ladies side. They managed to win their first piece of silverware, winning the Windsor 7's Plate Final 41-0 against Thames Valley Ladies. There is currently no women's team.

== Junior Rugby ==
For the 2025-26 season CVRFC fields sides within ranging from ages Colts (U18/17), U16, U15, U14 and U13 age groups playing within the Herts and Middx leagues.

2008/2009 season saw the first Junior side put out by Chess Valley in the U13 age group.

Training is mid-week and games are played on Sunday mornings. Sundays without games are also used to train.

== Mini Rugby ==
The Mini section of the club was started in the 1998/1999 season. Training and games take place on Sunday mornings.

Children playing U7s and U8s (stage 1) play Mini-Tag Rugby, U9s and U10s (stage 2) play Mini Rugby and U11s and U12s (stage 3) play Midi Rugby. A player’s age grade is determined by their age at midnight on 31 August at the beginning of each Season. The only exception to this are players that turn six during the season may start to play immediately rather than waiting until the following season.

== Match & Training Venues ==
=== Croxley Guild of Sport ===
The current home of Chess Valley having left their original ground and birthplace Rickmansworth Sports Club at the end of the 2012/13 season. Senior training and fixtures are usually played here.

Croxley Guild of Sport
The Green
Rickmansworth
WD3 3HT

=== St Joan of Arc School ===
Training takes place at St Joan of Arc for both the Mini's and the Junior sides.

St Joan of Arc School
High Street
Rickmansworth
Hertfordshire
WD3 1HG

== History ==
Formed in 1996, it is one of the youngest rugby clubs in Hertfordshire.

The club is often fondly referred to as "The Valley" by players and supporters.

== Club Officers History ==
Season	President	Club Chairman	Club Captain	1st Team Captain	2nd Team Captain	Mini/Youth Chair	Ladies Chair
96/97	Brian O'Connor	John O'Rouke		Chris Whitwell			
97/98	Brian O'Connor	John O'Rouke	Paul Kleian	Mark Kelly			
98/99	Mike Atkins	John O'Rouke	Mark Kelly	Ian Ormerod	Pete Wilson	Danny Kearns	
99/00	Mike Atkins	John O'Rouke	Mark Kelly	Ian Ormerod	Mark Dunford	Danny Kearns	
00/01	Mike Atkins	Ian Robb		Mathew Shepherd	Neil Cusack	Danny Kearns	
01/02	Mike Atkins	Ian Robb		Mathew Shepherd	Mark Dunford	Andrew Fawssett	
02/03	Mike Atkins	Jerry Green	Richard Nemeth	Michael Horwood	Mark Kelly	Andrew Fawssett	
03/04	Mike Atkins	Jerry Green	Paul Kleian	Michael Horwood	Greg Bertolotti	Andrew Fawssett	
04/05	Mike Atkins	Jerry Green	Paul Kleian	Timothy Simmonds	Greg Bertolotti	Andrew Fawssett	
05/06	Mike Atkins	Neil Brooks	Paul Kleian	Timothy Simmonds	Alan Walters/Adam Farnsworth	Mike Baldwin	
06/07	Mike Atkins	Neil Brooks	Paul Kleian	Matt Lever	Adam Farnsworth	Mike Baldwin	
07/08	Mike Atkins	Neil Brooks		Adam Farnsworth	Richard Nemeth	Mike Baldwin	
08/09	Mike Atkins	David Stokes	Adam Farnsworth	Mark Dunford	Richard Nemeth	Alex Wodzicki	
09/10	Mike Atkins	David Stokes	Adam Farnsworth	Paul Foskett	Dirk Ovenstone	Alex Wodzicki	Nikki Thomas
10/11	Mike Atkins	David Stokes	Phil Coulter	Graeme Coles	Mark Ryder	Andrew Fawssett	Nikki Thomas
11/12	Mike Atkins	David Stokes	Mark Dunford	Phil Morton	Andy Ruffell-Ward	Andrew Fawssett	
12/13	Mike Atkins	Phil Coulter	Richard Harvey		Andy Ruffell-Ward	Jonathon Stephen	
13/14	Mike Atkins	Phil Coulter	Richard Harvey	Josh Wilkinson	Andy Ruffell-Ward/Marc Adams	Jonathon Stephen	
14/15	Mike Atkins	Phil Coulter	Richard Harvey	Grant Vorster	Andy Ruffell-Ward/Marc Adams		
15/16	Mike Atkins	Phil Coulter	Richard Harvey	Will Adams	Andy Ruffell-Ward/Marc Adams	Rich Lake	
16/17	Mike Atkins	Phil Coulter	Sam Stabler	Steve Milligan		Rich Lake	
17/18	Mike Atkins	Doug Wotherspoon	Sam Stabler	Davey Adams		Rich Lake	
18/19	Mike Atkins	Doug Wotherspoon	Marc Adams	Davey Adams		Rich Lake	
19/20	Mike Atkins	Doug Wotherspoon	Marc Adams	Alex Gudiens		Rich Lake	
20/21	Mike Atkins	Doug Wotherspoon	Marc Adams	Alex Gudiens	Andy Ruffell-Ward	Rich Lake	
21/22	Mike Atkins	Doug Wotherspoon	Marc Adams	Alex Gudiens	Andy Ruffell-Ward	Rich Lake	
22/23	Mike Atkins	Doug Wotherspoon	Alex Gudiens	Scott Brooks	Andy Ruffell-Ward	Rich Lake	
23/24	Mike Adkins	Doug Wotherspoon	Scott Brooks	Oli Cox	Andy Ruffell-Ward	Rich Lake	
24/25	Mike Atkins	Doug Wotherspoon	Scott Brooks	Oli Cox	Grant Vorster	Rich Lake	
25/26	Mike Adkins	Doug Wotherspoon	Scott Brooks	Oli Cox	Luke Bennett/Matt Lever	Rich Lake	
26/27	Mike Adkins	Doug Wotherspoon	Scott Brooks	Oli Cox	Spencer Arnold/Luke Bennett		

== Club Honours ==
- Herts/Middlesex 4 North champions: 1998–99
- Herts/Middlesex 3 North champions: 2001–02
- Herts Presidents Trophy champions: 2021-22

== See also ==
- Hertfordshire RFU
- Middlesex RFU
- English rugby union system
- Rugby union in England
