= Tring Rugby =

English rugby union football club

(England) Tring RUFC
- Full name: Tring Rugby Union Football Club
- Union: Hertfordshire RFU
- Nickname: Tring Rangers
- Founded: 1963; 63 years ago
- Location: Tring, Hertfordshire, England
- Region: South East
- Ground(s): Pendley Sports Centre, Cow Lane (Capacity: 750)
- Chairman: John Ball
- President: Martyn Kirk
- Coach: Giles Wallis
- Captain: Oliver O'Gorman
- League: Regional 1 South East
- 2025–26: 3rd

Official website
- www.pitchero.com/clubs/tringrugby/

Tring Rugby Club is an English rugby union team based in Tring, Hertfordshire. The club runs four senior teams, two academy teams and a full range of junior teams. The first XV currently play in Regional 1 South East.

== History ==
Tring Rugby Union Football Club was founded in 1963 by commuters, Arthur Howlett, Donald Dover, Peter Hutton, Mike Hulme and local Doctors, David Thallon, Adams and Knox, who formed a team from replies to adverts in local newspapers. In September of the same year Arthur's son Stephen Howlett, who attended Tring's Mortimer Hill Secondary School established a junior team. Making history by pioneering the first rugby club in the UK to have a children's youth team mainly formed from the Tring & Berkhamsted schools 1st year football teams and playing at Kingsley Farm set between Manor Road and Meadow Close, Tring (now known as Kingsley Walk). Playing their first game against Stoke Mandeville with the senior team playing the 1964–65 season having co founder Doctor Knox kicking off their first game against Balcavians now Stevenage RUFC

In recent years the club has progressed up the league system, reaching the fifth tier in 2008. The club has played at that level ever since playing in the National 3 London South East Premier.

Chief amongst those setting up the club's future was a New Zealander, Mark Otway, who had been relocated to the UK for business and had settled in Tring. Otway was the first club captain and had enjoyed rugby at all levels in his native New Zealand, becoming an All Blacks trialist as well as making the country's Davis Cup tennis squad. Otway brought tales of life at the rugby clubs in New Zealand where a core part of the club's set up was based around children playing the game. This was unheard of in England, where rugby at junior level was played only at schools, and primarily fee paying ones at that. Tring liked what Otway had to say about bringing youth into the club and developing a community feel long before the phrase minis rugby was dreamed up. Members of that first youth and junior team are still active in the club today – a whole rugby career later.

As the town expanded the council compulsorily purchased the original site so it could become Dundale School and, in search of a new home, the club approached another local landowner, the show jumper Dorian Williams who owned the estate at Pendley, on the eastern edge of the town, close to the club's roots at Tring Station. Williams had a philanthropic vision for a cultural centre in Tring that comprised an arts centre, now the popular Court Theatre, an adult education college, which was located in Pendley Manor itself before it became a hotel and a sports centre which would be home to many of the towns sporting teams. Williams welcomed the club with open arms and they established a base alongside Tring Town Football Club (now home to Tring Athletic). By this time fielding two regular teams as well as a growing junior section, moved to the site in the early 1970s and were soon joined by the town's athletics, hockey, squash and bowls clubs at the burgeoning Cow Lane complex.

Facilities at Cow Lane remained rudimentary: the changing rooms were still housed in an enclosed former cowshed, and the showers were improvised until the club obtained enough concrete to install a plunge bath in the building.

A few years after starting life at Pendley the club had raised enough money to erect a pre-fabricated unit to act as a changing room cum clubhouse and on 13 April 1975 the club hosted its Ground Opening match when Tring took on an International XV which included many star names of the time. The building remained in this use until the mid-1980s when the plans for a purpose-built clubhouse were drawn up. The current clubhouse was opened in 1984 and the old clubhouse became the dedicated changing rooms until five years later when they made way for the brick built ones seen on site today. Success has been endemic throughout the club for many years but the achievements of the first team since the turn of the century have caught many peoples eye.

In 2003–04 they won their league Herts/Middlesex 1, losing only game all year and then repeated the feat in 2004–05 by winning London Four (north west), again losing just one game all season. In 2005–06 they competed in London Three (North West) against other local teams such as Harpenden, Welwyn and Fullerians, based in Watford, as well as teams from north and west London. They were runners up to Woodford at the end of the season and beat Norfolk side Diss (runners up in London 3 North East) in a play off match to achieve their third successive promotion up to London 2 North. The season also saw the club advance to its furthest position in the RFU's national Intermediate Cup competition where they reached the quarterfinals, losing to eventual cup-winners Stockport.

In comparison, the 2006–07 season was something of a disappointment although in reality a massive achievement for the club. They led London 2 north for long periods of the season, only to be over hauled by a strong Civil Service side in the last quarter. Tring were again runners up in the league and faced another play off to secure a fifth successive promotion. Their opponents were London 2 south side Thanet looking to make a return to London 1 having been relegated the previous year. Alas for Tring the luck was against them on the day and they lost to Thanet in one of the most compelling matches held at Cow Lane in front of nearly 650 spectators. Not deterred Tring attacked the 2007–08 season from the start and were part of the leading pack all season. In the end they edged past Staines and Chingford to take the league title and gain promotion to National League 3 London & SELondon 1 for 2008–09 — this is level five on the rugby pyramid and the highest level the club has ever performed at.

The club fields three other sides on a regular basis, along with an occasional vets side for the over 35's. After several years unbeaten in the Herts / Middlesex Merit Tables the second team now play in the Canterbury Shield. The third and fourth teams continue in the Merit Tables. Rugby in Tring is available across ages and standards.

The success of the England national team at the 2003 IRB World Cup, development of the game for girls and the growing trend amongst parents that rugby is a ‘nicer’ sport for their children to be involved with has led to an increase in membership for the club's mini and junior section. This season over 630 children between the ages of 3 and 16 regularly played or trained at the club. At this level fixtures are mostly made up of mini tournaments or festivals where several clubs will bring players covering several age groups to the club for a day of rugby. Every year, in March, Tring host an annual festival for Mini Rugby with 72 clubs from throughout the South East region compete and over 1400 children take part. Supported by a strong social network of parent & volunteer coaches and game officials within the club and those that aren't involved with coaching or watching will often sit in the clubhouse enjoying a tea or coffee or having a libation with family and friends while watching a game.

As an amateur organisation the club is supported by the parents of mini and junior players, the senior players; who pay match fees every week, and the generosity of a large band of Vice Presidents – a level of club membership which is supported by regular match day dinners and other events throughout the year. There are also contributory schemes with prize funds to increase revenue.

In June 2007 the club developed work on the TringRugby project, which sees the sections of the club; Tiger Cubs, Mini & Junior, Colts Academy, returning students and Seniors, amalgamate to form one strong club identity in inspiring its community youth to take up activity rugby sports.

As of 2020 the club has three active teams, with the 1st team captained by Oliver O'Gorman and coached by Giles Wallis, the 2nd team Jacques Keyser coached by Michael Hicks, and the 3rd team Alfie Noble coached by Daniel Boniface. Mason Wallace has also taken over as Director of Rugby from Dan Boniface, and Éamonn Borg-Neal took over as head of Communications, replacing the long serving Daniel Maxwell. The grounds are well looked after by Martin 'Muddy' Waters, the kits for all three teams are cleaned and pressed weekly by Gareth Haywood, and the Treasurer and Secretary are Hugh Logan and Matt Adams respectively. During the Coronavirus pandemic local businessman Matthew Boswell came up with a fundraising idea which generated over £5,000 for the club thanks to donations from players, supporters and vice presidents alike.

== Honours ==
- Hertfordshire 1 champions: 1994–95
- Hertfordshire Presidents' Trophy winners (3): 2002, 2003, 2004
- Herts/Middlesex 1 champions: 2003–04
- London Division 4 North West champions: 2004–05
- London 2 (north-east v north-west) promotion play-off winners: 2005–06
- London 1 North champions (2): 2007–08, 2016–17
- Hertfordshire Presidents' Cup winners: 2012
