= Hertford RFC =

English rugby union club, based in Hertfordshire

Hertford
- Full name: Hertford Rugby Football Club
- Union: Hertfordshire RFU
- Founded: 1932; 94 years ago
- Region: Ware, Hertfordshire, England
- Ground: Highfields
- Chairman: Karen Newbury
- President: Peter King
- League: Regional 1 South East
- 2025–26: 7th
Team kit

Official website
- hertfordrfc.co.uk

Hertford Rugby Football Club is an English rugby union team based in Ware, Hertfordshire. The club runs five senior sides, the full range of junior teams and a women's section which includes three women's teenage teams. The first XV currently play in Regional 1 South East.

== History ==
Hertford Rugby Football Club was formed in 1932 as Old Hertfordians by a group of enthusiasts from Hertford Grammar School (now Richard Hale School). The club played at six venues until moving to their present location at Hoe Lane in 1949. In 1972 the club adopted their present name of Hertford RFC.

== Honours ==
- Hertfordshire Presidents' Cup winners (9): 1981, 1982, 1986, 2004, 2005, 2006, 2007, 2008, 2011
- London 3 North West champions (3): 1994–95, 1999–00, 2000–01
- London 2 North champions: 2001–02
- Powergen Intermediate Cup winners: 2003
- National League 3 (south-east v south-west) promotion play-off winners (2): 2003–04, 2010–11
