= St Albans RFC =

English rugby union club, based in St Albans, Hertfordshire

(England) St Albans RFC
- Full name: St Albans Rugby Football Club
- Union: Hertfordshire RFU
- Nickname: “Saints”
- Founded: 1970; 56 years ago
- Location: St Albans, Hertfordshire, England
- Ground: Boggymead Springs
- Chairman: Mark Elliott
- Coach: George Elliott (DOR)
- League: Herts/Middlesex 1
- 2019-20: Runners up (promoted to London 3 North West)

Official website
- www.pitchero.com/clubs/stalbansrfc

St Albans Rugby Club is a rugby union club based in St Albans, South-east England. The 1st XV currently plays in London NW3 following promotion from Herts/Middlesex1 at the end of the 2019-20 season.

== History ==
The club was formed in 1970 by their first chairman, Peter Baines. The club formed as an open rugby club with many players joining from the old Electrical Apparatus Company (EAC) rugby club which played off New Barnes Avenue.

Initially the club used changing rooms at Westminster Lodge and a rented pitch situated just above the hypocaust in Verulamium Park. The North Western PH (now a block of flats) on the corner of Prospect Road and Holywell Hill provided a club room and meals on match days. In 1976 the club acquired the short term lease from St Albans School for a pitch and clubhouse off Belmont Hill.

1983 saw the club move to their current ground at Boggymead Springs, off Oaklands Lane, at Smallford, obtained on a long term lease from Hertfordshire CC. The clubhouse was officially opened by the England scrum half, Dickie Jeeps, in October that year.

== Other sports ==
St Albans RFC also hosts Ultimate Frisbee with St Alban Ultimate and recently the Hertfordshire Cheetahs American football team who play in the BAFA National Leagues Division 2 East.

== Playing level ==
The club currently plays in London North West 3. In 2012 the 1st XV won the Herts Presidents' Tankard for the 2nd time and for a 3rd time in 2019. “Saints” are again finalists in 2020. The club also fields 2nd and 3rd XV sides which compete in the local Herts/Middlesex League (HMMT) Merit Tables.

St Albans RFC welcomes players of all abilities, as well as social members.

== Twickenham appearance ==
In 1995 the club qualified from over 500 junior clubs to reach the final of the Pilkington Shield at Twickenham, where they played and lost to Bedford Queens 11-10 immediately prior to the Wasps v Bath Pilkington Cup Final. The club qualified to enter the Pilkington Cup itself a few years later, through reaching the Hertfordshire President’s Cup final.

== Club honours ==
1st team

- Hertfordshire 1 champions: 1993–94
- London Division 3 North West champions: 2004–05
- Hertfordshire Presidents' Tankard winners (3): 2010, 2012, 2019

2nd XV'

- Herts and Middlesex Merit Table 6 champions: 2016–17
- Herts and Middlesex Merit Table 6 Plate champions: 2016–17
- Herts and Middlesex Merit Table 4 champions: 2019–20
