= Letchworth Garden City RUFC =

English rugby union club, based in Hertfordshire

Coordinates: 51.9767°N 0.2050°W

(England) Letchworth Garden City RUFC
- Full name: Letchworth Garden City Rugby Union Football Club
- Union: Hertfordshire RFU
- Founded: 1924; 102 years ago
- Location: Letchworth, Hertfordshire, England
- Ground(s): Legends Lane, Letchworth
- Chairman: Chris Lunnon
- President: Brian Burke
- Coach: Baz Basra
- Captain: Liam Fitts
- League: Regional 1 South East
- 2025–26: 2nd

Official website
- letchworthrugby.rfu.club

The Letchworth Garden City Rugby Union Football Club is a rugby union club based in Letchworth Garden City, Hertfordshire, England. The club runs up to three senior teams each week, along with a mixed ability side the Braveherts, and has thriving mini, junior, girls and ladies sections the Lionesses. The first team currently play in Regional 1 South East following their promotion from Regional 2 Anglia at the end of season 2022–23. The lionesses and the men's team had recent success in the Hitchin 10s Tournament. August 2022.

== History ==
(For more information see the club's history page on its website)

=== Formation ===
Though there are some suggestions that a rugby club may have existed in Letchworth Garden City before the First World War, no documentary proof has been found and it is not until 1924 that the first records exist of the game being played in the town. Letchworth Garden City Rugby Club itself was founded two years later in 1926 when a group of rugby followers, led by Arthur A Lamb, met at the offices of Bolton and Tabor in the Town Centre and declared that "no town could be complete without a rugby club" (a reference to the fact that the town itself was only just over 20 years old). Despite this apparently late start to the game (the town already had well established clubs in many other sports) Letchworth was one of the first rugby clubs to be formed in the area - local rival clubs in Hitchin, Royston and Stevenage not being formed until after the Second World War.

The first match was played against RAF Henlow (the airmen won), and the new club also played teams such as Luton, RAF Duxford, Wellingborough and a BBC team which included the well known broadcaster Rex Alston. Home games were played on a pitch in Pixmore Avenue, loaned by Phoenix Car Company, and players changed in the nearby Balmoral Hotel. However the club's history reports that "it was tough going. Letchworth had a shifting population and few rugby players stayed for long. There were some soccer converts who had a lot to learn: the lineouts were hopeless, there was no idea of loose play or binding tight but they persevered. On the brighter side two founder members, M. Dent and R. Copley, were the first Letchworth players to play for the County."

The club's first permanent home was found in the club's second season (1926–27) when a ground was secured in Cashio Lane. Letchworth Grammar School opened in 1931, a rugby-playing school that boosted player numbers significantly. However, there was now competition for players as in 1934 one of the biggest companies in the town – the British Tabulating Machine Company (a fore-runner of ICL) – created a team called The Tabulators. This created a great rivalry, but also split players between the two clubs (though they often worked together to help each other field teams). This period was not to last for long. The Second World War brought competitive rugby to an end, and after the war both clubs were struggling to survive – Letchworth had a bank balance of only 12s 5d (62p in modern money) in 1947, and in 1950 The Tabulators folded.

=== A new home ===
However this concentrated the game onto one club, which - as the game grew in popularity - began to thrive. By the 1950s the club had started to out-grow its ground, and the changing rooms it was borrowing from Norton Road Secondary Modern School were less suitable for the level of opposition the club was attracting. After a search by dedicated club members Glyn Carter and Bill Howells (formerly of Cardiff and a Welsh trialist) – aided and abetted by Arthur Lamb, Miles Tabor, Ralph Wagstaff, Gordon Imber and Gordon Collinson - a new home was found at Baldock Road. The club initially hired two pitches (later expanded) on land owned by the First Garden City Company in 1955, and on 15 September 1956 the club opened its first clubhouse, with its own bar and changing rooms.

This development was coupled with success on the field. In 1959–60 the 1st XV won 25 of its 28 games, drawing two more and only losing one – its best ever record. The clubhouse was expanded in 1963 to cope with the rate of growth, and in the following season a third pitch was added. By the mid-sixties the club was fielding six XVs, and international sides were visiting to play exhibition games, and in club recorded its largest ever win, 117–0 against Hawker-Siddeley in the Herts Presidents Cup.

=== League rugby, and the junior section ===
From the 1970s rugby in local schools began to decline, affecting player numbers, so in the 1980s the club formed a junior and minis section. The club gained several successes in the President's Cup, bringing top level opposition such as Blackheath to Baldock Road for competitive fixtures in the Pilkington Cup, and with the arrival of leagues in the 1990s Letchworth briefly reached the heights of London North 2, but found themselves in London 4 by 1998.

Changes in the game and population at large meant that player numbers had fallen by the end of the 1990s, but the club could still field three XVs and by 2002 Letchworth were back in London 2, where they have remained ever since.

== Honours ==
- Hertfordshire Presidents' Cup winners (5): 1977, 1978, 1987, 2014, 2015
- Hertfordshire 1 champions: 1989–90
- London 3 North West champions: 1990–91
- London 4 North West champions: 2000–01
- London 2 (north-east v north-west) promotion play-off winner: 2001–02
- Regional 2 Anglia (level 6) champions: 2022–23

== Junior rugby ==
For a period junior rugby was a low priority at Letchworth, but in recent years that has changed dramatically. Several years of steady growth since 2000 culminated in January 2007 when both the club's under-13 and under-14 teams won promotion to the first division of the Herts/Middlesex League in only their second season in the league. Another notable achievement was during the 2008–09 season, when the under-15's were crowned county champions after seeing off Old Albanians in a hard-fought final.

== Women's and girls' rugby ==
A women's team existed at the club for a short period in the 1990s, but it was not until 2004 that the female game was revived at the club with the formation of a girls' section catering for girls aged 11 to 18. Beginning with only seven girls in its first year, by 2006 the section had grown to be one of the largest in the region when it lifted its first trophy – the Rochford Tens. In 2006 the club also hosted one of the largest one-day girls' rugby festivals ever.Hertfordshire Girls' Sevens

At its peak the girls' team was in the top ten in the country, reaching the semi-finals of the National Cup, the last five of the National 10s, and winning the Plate competition at the National Sevens twice, and Letchworth girls featured in representative sides at all levels. However, the departure of many leading players at the end of the decade was not initially balanced by new players and by 2010 the future of the section was in doubt. However, a massive recruitment exercise resulted in a significant increase in numbers and the future of girls rugby at Letchworth for the next four or five years seems assured.
