= Bishop's Stortford RFC =

English rugby union club, based in Hertfordshire

(England) Bishop's Stortford
- Full name: Bishop's Stortford Rugby Football Club
- Union: Hertfordshire RFU
- Founded: 1921; 105 years ago
- Location: Bishop's Stortford, Hertfordshire, England
- Ground: Silver Leys (Capacity: 1,600)
- Chairman: Gaz Tracey
- President: Dave Walker
- Coach: Tom Coleman
- Captain: Will Rogers
- League: National League 1
- 2025–26: 6th
Team kit

Official website
- bsrfc.co.uk

Bishop's Stortford is an English rugby union team based in Bishop's Stortford, Hertfordshire. The club runs five senior men's sides, a ladies' team, O2 touch rugby section and the full range of mini and junior teams, from under-6's to under-18's. The first XV were promoted to the third tier of the English rugby union system, National League 1 for the first time in season 2017–18.

== History ==
Bishop's Stortford Rugby Football Club was formed in 1921 and has played at its current location at Silver Leys since 1928. When the league system was introduced in 1987 the club was placed in the London 3 tier and won promotion to London 2 North. It took fifteen attempts to win promotion to London 1 in 2003. The club earned promotion to National League 2 South in April 2013. Four years later they gained another promotion, winning the National League 2 South on 22 April 2017, after beating Exmouth 60–7 away. On 30 April 2017, the club recorded its highest attendance, with 1,664 for the final league match of the season against Barnes.

== Current standings ==
2026–27 National League 1 table
Pos	Team	Pld	W	D	L	PF	PA	PD	TB	LB	Pts	Qualification
1	Plymouth Albion	7	7	0	0	382	90	+292	7	0	35	Promotion place
2	Tonbridge Juddians	7	7	0	0	301	254	+47	7	0	35	Promotion play-off
3	Camborne	7	6	0	1	255	199	+56	6	0	30	Promotion play-off
4	Leeds Tykes	7	4	0	3	255	187	+68	5	3	24	
5	Sale FC	7	4	0	3	281	205	+76	5	2	23	
6	Bishop's Stortford	7	3	0	4	247	242	+5	6	2	20	
7	Rosslyn Park	7	3	0	4	235	252	−17	6	1	19	
8	London Scottish	7	3	0	4	243	277	−34	5	1	18	
9	Birmingham Moseley	7	3	0	4	195	253	−58	5	1	18	
10	Bury St Edmunds	7	3	0	4	196	271	−75	5	0	17	
11	Rams	7	2	1	4	175	233	−58	5	1	16	Relegation play-off
12	Sheffield	7	2	0	5	171	242	−71	5	2	15	Relegation place
13	Dings Crusaders	7	1	1	5	250	298	−48	6	3	15	Relegation place
14	Cambridge	7	0	0	7	197	380	−183	5	3	8	Relegation place

Updated to match(es) played on 17 October 2026. Source: National League Rugby
Rules for classification: If teams are level at any stage, tiebreakers are applied in the following order:
1. Number of matches won
2. Number of matches drawn
3. Difference between points for and against
4. Total number of points for
5. Aggregate number of points scored in matches between tied teams
6. Number of matches won excluding the first match, then the second and so on until the tie is settled

== Honours & club records ==
1st team:

- Hertfordshire 7's winners (6): 1965, 1972, 1986, 1994, 1997, 1998
- Hertfordshire Presidents' Cup winners (4): 1972, 1979, 1996, 2009
- London 3 North West champions: 1987–88
- London Division 2 North champions: 2002–03
- National League 3 London & SE champions: 2012–13
- National League 2 South champions: 2016–17

2nd team (Blues):

- Hertfordshire Presidents' Cup winners (4): 2013, 2016, 2017, 2018

Colts

- Hertfordshire Colts Cup winners (12): 1991, 1992, 1995, 1998, 1999, 2004, 2005, 2008, 2009, 2010, 2011, 2014
- National Colts Cup winners (2): 2006, 2013
- National Colts Plate winners: 2011

Club records

- Highest attendance: 1,664 v Barnes on 29 April 2017 in National League 2 South
