= London New Zealand RFC =

London New Zealand
- Full name: London New Zealand Rugby Football Club
- Union: Rugby Football Union
- Emblem: Silver fern
- Founded: 1926; 100 years ago
- Location: London
- Ground: Twyford Avenue Sports Ground

London New Zealand Rugby Football Club is an English rugby union club currently based in Acton, London. They were formed in 1926 as a club for New Zealand expatriates in the United Kingdom and are affiliated to the Middlesex Rugby Football Union.

== History ==
London New Zealand was initially founded in 1926 for visitors from New Zealand to be able to play rugby in England. However the club became inactive during the Second World War and remained so until 1962. The club were initially based at Aorangi Park in Wimbledon, leased from the All England Lawn Tennis and Croquet Club. The lease was terminated by the All England club in 1981 in order for The Championships, Wimbledon to be held. Since then the club has been nomadic, moving to Osterley and Greenford before settling in Acton and playing their matches at Wasps FC's Twyford Avenue Sports Ground. By 2012, the club had downsized to running only one team.

== Privileges ==
A number of players for the New Zealand national rugby union team have played for London New Zealand, including Doug Rollerson, Terry Morrison and Paul Sapsford. In recognition of their history, the club have been granted privileges by both the Rugby Football Union and the New Zealand Rugby Union. They are the only rugby team aside from New Zealand national representative teams that wears the silver fern as their crest and the RFU exempted them from the overseas player quotas, prior to their abolition. The club have also taken part in a number of New Zealand government functions, including traditionally playing a rugby match against an invitational national side for commemorations of the Battle of Passchendaele. They also represent New Zealand culturally in England by performing the traditional haka.
