= Hitchin Rugby Club =

English rugby union club, based in Hitchin, Hertfordshire

Coordinates: 51.9602°N 0.2805°W

- Full name: Hitchin Rugby Club
- Union: Hertfordshire RFU
- Founded: 1954; 72 years ago
- Location: Hitchin, Hertfordshire, England
- Ground(s): King George V Playing Fields, Old Hale Way, Hitchin, SG5 1XL
- Chairman: Peter Tasko
- President: David Marshall
- Coach: Gary Ayres
- Captain: Ruiri Shanahan
- League: Counties 1 Hertfordshire
- 2025-26: 3rd
1st kit	2nd kit

Official website
- www.hitchinrugbyclub.co.uk

Hitchin Rugby Club is a rugby club based in Hitchin, Hertfordshire, England.

The men's side currently play in Counties 1 Hertfordshire – a league at the 7th level of the English rugby union system – following their promotion from London 3 North West in the 2021–22 season. The women's side 1XV plays in NC1 (East) as of 2024, and previously played in Championship 2.

== Formation ==
The club was formed in 1954. Highlights have included playing at Twickenham in the final of the national Junior RFU Cup in 1993, and the establishment of the country's first Academy. The club received the RFU 'Club Seal of Approval' in 2012.

The women's team was founded in 1992.

== Men's rugby ==
Hitchin's 1st XV competes in the Counties 1 Hertfordshire league following the club's promotion from London 3 North West at the end of the 2021–22 season. Hitchin's 2nd XV competes in the Counties 2 Hertfordshire league following the club's promotion from Counties 3 Hertfordshire at the end of the 2025-26 season. Hitchin's 3rd XV competes in the Counties 3 Hertfordshire league following admission to the RFU league system for the 2026-27 season. Hitchin finished the 2018–19 season as champions of Herts/Middlesex 1, returning to London 3 North West at the first attempt.

== Women's rugby ==
The Ladies 1XV team currently play in Women's NC 1 East, the fourth tier of Women's rugby.

== Youth rugby ==
Hitchin Women's Rugby Team
- Founded: 1992; 34 years ago
- Location: Hitchin, Hertfordshire, England
- Ground(s): King George V Playing Fields, Old Hale Way, Hitchin, SG5 1XL
- Chairman: Womens' Section: Holly Watson
- Coach: Chris "Lofty" Watts
- League: Championship 2 (until 2024/25) NC1 East (2025-26)
- Current season

The Mini and Youth Section was founded in 1988. The section currently has a membership of over 650, running teams for boys and girls aged 5-18.

== Notable players ==
- (Denmark) Dan Wiggins, Danish national team
- (Denmark) Ben Wiggins, Danish national team

== Honours ==
- Hertfordshire 2 champions: 1988–89
- Herts/Middlesex 1 champions (2): 2004–05, 2018–19
- Counties 3 Hertfordshire champions: 2025-26 (2XV)
- Hertfordshire Presidents' Trophy winners (2): 2005, 2026
