= Hertfordshire Rugby Football Union =

(England) Hertfordshire RFU
- Full name: Hertfordshire Rugby Football Union
- Union: RFU
- Founded: 1935; 91 years ago
- Region: Hertfordshire, parts of London
- Chairman: Simon Embleton
- President: Adrian Sparks
Team kit

Official website
- www.hertsrugby.co.uk

The Hertfordshire Rugby Football Union is the governing body for the sport of rugby union in the county of Hertfordshire in England. The union is the constituent body of the Rugby Football Union (RFU) for Hertfordshire, and administers and organises rugby union clubs and competitions in the county. It also administers the Hertfordshire county rugby representative teams.

== History ==
Although the Hertfordshire Rugby Football Union was formed in 1935 and there have been club sides based in the county since as the late 19th century, a senior representative side did not take part in the County Championships until as late as 1952. Two years later after their debut, the county was finally awarded constituent status by the RFU in 1954, allowing them to have a representative on the RFU committee. Over the years Hertfordshire has become an important member of the RFU and is currently one of the stronger sides in the men's County Championships.

== Hertfordshire senior men's county side ==
Hertfordshire senior men's county side currently play in the Bill Beaumont Division 1 South – the top level of the County Championships. They have reached several finals in the counties history, most recently in 2012 when they finished as winners after beating Lancashire 38–20 at Twickenham.

Honours:

- Bill Beaumont Cup winners: 2012

== Affiliated clubs ==
There are currently 29 clubs affiliated with the Hertfordshire RFU, most of which have teams at both senior and junior level. The majority of clubs are based in Hertfordshire, but there are also clubs from north-west London.

- Barnet Elizabethans
- Berkhamsted
- Bishop's Stortford
- Black Horse
- Cheshunt
- Chess Valley
- Cuffley
- Datchworth
- Fullerians
- Harpenden
- Hatfield Queen Elizabeth
- Hemel Hempstead
- Hertford
- Herts Fire & Rescue Service
- Hitchin
- Letchworth Garden City
- Old Albanian
- Royston
- St Albans
- Stevenage Town
- Tabard
- The Mount
- Tring
- University of Hertfordshire
- Verulamians
- Watford
- Welwyn
- West Herts College
- Weston

== County club competitions ==
The Hertfordshire RFU currently runs the following competitions for club sides based in Hertfordshire and occasionally, north-west London:

=== Leagues ===
- Herts/Middlesex 1 (alongside Middlesex RFU) – league ranked at tier 9 of the English rugby union system for club sides based in Hertfordshire and the historic county of Middlesex (now London)
- Herts/Middlesex 2 – tier 10 league

=== Cups ===
- Hertfordshire Presidents' Cup – founded in 1970, for club sides at tier 6 of the English rugby union system as well as 2nd teams for local clubs in higher divisions (tiers 3–5)
- Hertfordshire Presidents' Tankard – founded in 2010, for clubs at tiers 7–8
- Hertfordshire Presidents' Trophy – founded in 1999, for clubs at tiers 9–10

=== Discontinued competitions ===
- Herts/Middlesex 3 - tier 11 league, discontinued in 2014
- Herts/Middlesex 4 - tier 12 league, discontinued in 2010
- Herts/Middlesex 5 - tier 13 league, discontinued in 1997
- Hertfordshire 1 - tier 8-10 league, discontinued in 1996
- Hertfordshire 2 - tier 9 league, discontinued in 1990

== See also ==
- London & SE Division
- English rugby union system
