= Old Albanian RFC =

English rugby union club, based in Hertfordshire

(England) Old Albanian RFC
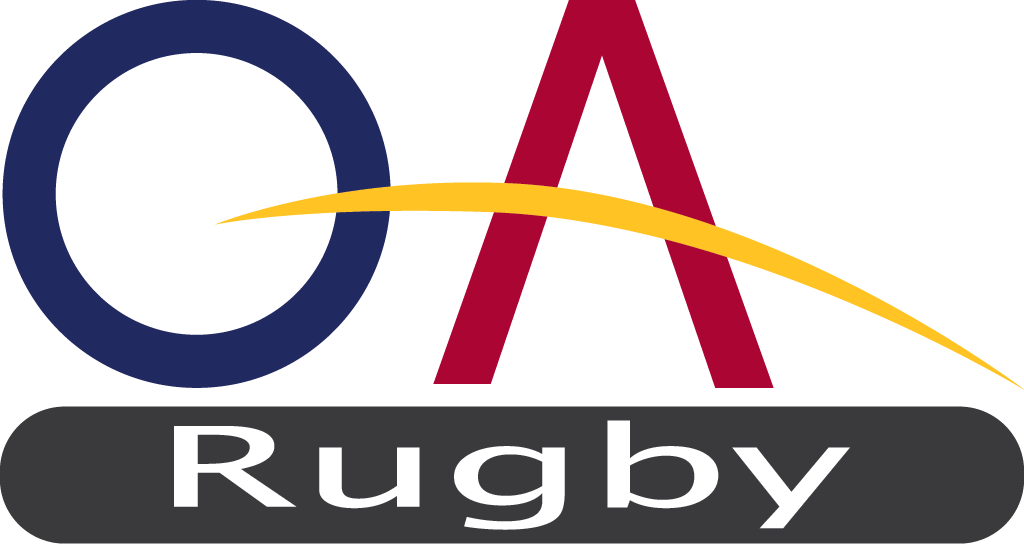
- Full name: Old Albanian Rugby Football Club
- Union: Hertfordshire RFU
- Nickname: OAs
- Founded: 1924; 102 years ago
- Location: St Albans, Hertfordshire, England
- Ground: Woollam's Playing Fields (Capacity: 1,000)
- Chairman: Scott Bachmann
- President: Richard Milnes
- Director of Rugby: James Osborn
- Coach: Daniel George
- Captain: Toby Ponsford
- League: National League 2 East
- 2025–26: 3rd
Team kit

Official website
- www.oarugby.com

Old Albanian Rugby Football Club (OAs) is a rugby union club based in St Albans, Hertfordshire, England. The club currently play in National League 2 East.

== History ==
The club was formed in 1924 by a group of Old Boys of St Albans School. They acquired their first pavilion, which was a timber World War I Barrack Hut, located at Beech Bottom. They are the largest community sports club in Hertfordshire.

The club won promotion from National League 2 South in 2011–12 to National League 1, and in 2012–13 finished 5th, their highest place in the English rugby union system. The club was relegated from National One at the end of the 2014–15 season, after an administration error led to a five-point deduction; this meant that the club missed out on staying up by just a single point. They were promoted back into the division after winning the play-off in 2015–16 before being relegated again to National League 2 South at the end of the 2017–18 season. Following the implementation of a new competition structure for the National Leagues that took effect for the 2022–23 season, Old Albanians was placed in National League 2 East.

== Current standings ==
2025–26 National League 2 East table
Pos	Team	Pld	W	D	L	PF	PA	PD	TB	LB	Pts	Qualification
1	Bury St Edmunds (C)	26	20	1	5	1128	659	+469	22	4	108	Promotion place
2	Oundle	26	20	2	4	940	713	+227	21	1	106	Promotion Play-off
3	Old Albanian	26	18	0	8	1009	813	+196	22	3	97	
4	Barnes	26	16	1	9	738	598	+140	15	5	86	
5	Canterbury	26	16	0	10	851	644	+207	16	6	86	
6	Dorking	26	14	2	10	798	598	+200	13	6	79	
7	Westcombe Park	26	12	0	14	851	751	+100	19	8	75	
8	Havant	26	11	1	14	840	960	−120	19	1	66	
9	London Welsh	26	10	0	16	705	866	−161	16	8	64	
10	Guernsey Raiders	26	11	1	14	690	875	−185	13	3	62	
11	Esher	26	10	0	16	844	831	+13	16	6	62	
12	Henley Hawks	26	9	2	15	693	665	+28	12	9	61	Relegation Play-off
13	Sevenoaks (R)	26	8	0	18	743	900	−157	12	5	49	Relegation place
14	Oxford Harlequins (R)	26	2	0	24	505	1462	−957	11	2	21	Relegation place

Updated to match(es) played on 2 May 2026. Source: National League Rugby
Rules for classification: If teams are level at any stage, tiebreakers are applied in the following order:
1. Number of matches won
2. Number of matches drawn
3. Difference between points for and against
4. Total number of points for
5. Aggregate number of points scored in matches between tied teams
6. Number of matches won excluding the first match, then the second and so on until the tie is settled

== Men's teams and honours ==
1st team

- London 3 North West champions: 1995–96
- Hertfordshire Presidents' Cup winners (2): 1998, 2010
- Hertfordshire Sevens winners: 2001, 2009
- National League 3 (south-east v south-west) promotion play-off winner: 2009–10
- National League 2 South champions: 2011–12
- National 2 promotion play-off winner: 2015–16

OAs Academy

2nd team (Romans)

- London 2 (north v south) promotion play-off winner: 2002–03

3rd team (Gladiators)

4th team (Grizzlies)

== OA RFC's recent achievements ==
1987 — selected, with two other Hertfordshire clubs, to form part of London League Division 2

1996 — Won London NW Division 3 gaining promotion to London League Division 2 North

1998 — Won the Herts. President's Cup

2001 — Won the County Sevens and were runner-up in the Herts. President's Cup

2003 — Promotion to London League Division One

2005 — Reached their then highest league position (5th place in Powergen London One)

2009 — Won the Herts County 7s, runner-up in the Herts County Cup Final. OA Colts reach both National Cup & Herts County Cup Finals and finish as runner-up.

2010 — OAs gain promotion to National League 2 South from National League 3 South East with a play-off win vs Old Patesians R.F.C. Old Albanian Saints gain promotion to RFUW Premiership.

2012 — OAs gain promotion to National League 1

2013 — Achieved their highest position in National League rugby, 5th place in National League 1

== Mini and junior rugby ==
OAs has recruited over 900 mini and junior rugby players. The Mini’s are in the Hertfordshire leagues, whilst the Juniors’s are represented in the Saracens Herts and Middlesex Junior leagues.

== Junior & senior women's rugby ==
OA Saints are the women's section of Old Albanians (OA) Rugby Football Club. The women's section were originally part of St Albans RFC, based in Smallford, which formed in 1989 from only four female players and grew to a squad of over 45 with a place in the top flight National Premiership League One in 1997–98 returning to the Women's Rugby Premiership for two seasons in 2010–11 and 2011–12.

In 2003, a year after the Old Albanians moved from Beech Bottom and took up residence in the new facilities at Woollam's playing fields, the Saints were invited to join OA Rugby. The women's section brought with them and keeps to this day their title ‘Saints’ as a nostalgic reminder of their roots at St Albans RFC.

Since joining OA Rugby, the Saints have established a women's section with a reputation as one of the top women's club in the county, with regional, divisional and international representative honours amongst its ranks. In 2005 the first women's XV ('OA SAINTS'), unbeaten since November 2003, secured the South East One league title without losing a game. They won promotion to National League 2 in the subsequent play-off competition, securing victory over each of their regional rivals. In 2010 the OA Saints 1st XV gained promotion to the RFUW Premiership. They currently compete in the National South East 2 Championship and finished 3rd in the league for the 2016–17 and 2017–18 season, so are targeting to win the league in the 2018–19 season. In the 2018–2019 season with England and Saracens full back Sarah McKenna now established in the coaching team, the Saints won the Championship SE2 league by 8 points and then gained promotion to Championship 1 South by beating Guildford Gazelles in the play-off. They also completed the double by beating Harrogate RFC in the RFU National Intermediate cup final to record their most successful season

In 2017–18 the junior sides have won a multitude of tournaments and their league as well as getting Saracens, County and England Talent Development Group honours (detailed below)

== 2017–18 Saints success summary ==
Under 13s The U13s don't play in a league but had a very successful season only losing three games.

Waterfall Series – played a series of round robin tournaments, topped 3 of the 4 and finished 2nd in one

Peterborough Tournament – finished top of their pool, lost semi-final 10–15 so finished 3rd.

St George's Day (Middlesex) Tournament, finished top of their pool, no play-offs.

RAF Halton Tournament – finished top of their pool, no play-offs.

Worthing Tournament – won the tournament.

Under 15s National Cup-Topped their pool in Area 2 overall finished 4th in Area 2 (A1, A2, A3 are South England &

A4, A5, A6-North)

St George's Day (Middlesex) Tournament – finished 4th.

RAF Halton Tournament – finished 4th.

Worthing Tournament – runner-up in Plate.

7 selected to represent Herts County under-15s

Under 18s

National Cup – (A1, A2, A3 are South England & A4, A5, A6-North)

A Team –- topped their pool in Area 2 and are Area 2 cup winners, then played A1 & A3 winners to

establish the South of England Champion but lost those finals so ended up as 3rd best team in the South.

B Team – topped their pool in Area 2, won their quarter-final but lost the semi-final finishing 4th in Area 2.

Inv XV Series – runner-up

St George's Day (Middlesex) Tournament – finished 1st, cup winners.

RAF Halton Tournament – finished 3rd.

Worthing Tournament – Plate winners.

Seventeen selected to represent Herts County U18s

One selected to represent Essex County U18s

Ten selected to represent Saracens U18 Centre of Excellence (Academy).

Ladies

Women's Intermediate Cup – reached the last of the pool stages

Women's South East 2 Championship – finished 3rd in the league – 3 tops from top spot.

Five players selected to represent Herts County

One player selected to represent Essex County

Ten players taking part in summer 7s tournaments in the UK and Europe.

== Facilities ==
After 78 years based at Beech Bottom, the club moved to their current playing fields following the development of Cheapside Farm into The Woollam Playing Fields, generally referred to as "Woollam's". The playing facilities opened in 2002 with a club-selected XV match against a star-studded international XV led by Peter Winterbottom which formed the centre-piece of the opening ceremony.

The state-of-the-art sporting complex on the northern outskirts of St Albans was acknowledged as the largest sporting development in Europe during its construction. It is regarded by many as the finest amateur sporting venue in the land. The Woollam Playing Fields is the choice of Saracens for their home training base and has hosted both England Under 16 and England RFUW International matches.

== Representative honours ==
OAs have had players recognized at county level and national level.

Men's rugby
England: Jeff Probyn, Maro Itoje, Max Malins, Nick Isiekwe, Paul Gustard
Wales : Paul Turner
Ireland : Darragh O'Mahony
Barbarians: Steve Pope, Gregg Botterman
Serbia: Danilo Bulatovic
Sweden: Charlie Openshaw, Andrew Daish
Belgium : Craig Dowsett

Women's rugby
England: Sarah McKenna
Italy: Nadia Brannon
Scotland: Caroline Collie & Jodie Rettie
Ireland: Trina Edgar & Megan Williams
Hong Kong: Tamsin Reed
