= Harpenden RFC =

English rugby union club, based in Harpenden, Hertfordshire

Coordinates: 51°48′8.03″N 0°22′20.6″W

Harpenden
- Full name: Harpenden Rugby Football Club
- Union: Hertfordshire RFU
- Founded: 1919; 107 years ago
- Location: Harpenden, Hertfordshire, England
- Ground: Redbourn Lane
- President: Will Hutchins
- Coach: Matt Davies
- League: Regional 1 South East
- 2024–25: 11th (relegated to Regional 2 Thames)

Official website
- www.hrfc.com

Harpenden Rugby Football Club is a rugby club based in Harpenden. They play in Regional 2 Thames – a league at tier 6 of the English rugby union system – following their relegation from Regional 1 South East at the end of the 2024–25 season

== Formation ==
It was formed in 1919 when a group of young men, old friends and school friends were having coffee together in 'Bunty's Tea Room' in the High Street on the corner of Vaughan Road, Harpenden. For the most part they had all played rugby at school and decided they would try and form a side to continue playing together. After some difficulty they found a ground they could use in Rothamsted Park, a large open area owned by the Lord of the Manor, contacted some opponents and managed to arrange a few games during the 1919–20 season, playing as Harpenden Old Public Schoolboys.

== Establishment ==
The following season, on 2 March 1921, they were officially constituted as the Harpenden Rugby Football Club and began to establish themselves. Unfortunately their use of the pitch in Rothamsted Park was abruptly terminated by the then Lady of the Manor who apparently classified rugby players as 'rough loiterers'; a new pitch was then found in Townsend Lane. At the same time the changing accommodation, a barn behind 'The Cock' public house in the High Street was transferred to another barn behind the rival pub on the opposite side of the road, 'The Cross Keys'. That pub has remained a meeting point for club members over the years. It was, under Reg Johnson (the Landlord at that time), instrumental in establishing The National Original Cross Keys Pub Sevens which over 30 years has grown from a small ad hoc tournament catering for a few local players who wanted to play on a Sunday to the annual HRFC Pub Sevens.

== 1926 to 1946 ==
By 1926 the club was able to establish a more permanent home in a field behind the water tower in Overstone Road, with a wooden hut as both pavilion and changing room. Additional land was subsequently acquired, affording another pitch, and a spectators' stand was built at that time. The club was flourishing, having 65 playing members. Nearly all of them found their way into the services during the last war when the club had to cease playing. In 1946 play began again at Overstone Road thanks to the forethought of the founders who had, at the outset, formed a limited company, which assisted in restarting the game after the cessation of hostilities. Rugby prospered in the town.

== 1948 to 1964 ==
In 1948 the Dalkeith Club was formed to provide small social amenities including a licensed bar; and to accommodate it in 1951 a further hut was built. In 1955 the hut was doubled in size. By then the club was regularly fielding 6 XVs. Having only 2 pitches and limited changing and bar facilities, and no room to expand, the need for completely new accommodation became obvious. The search for a new ground began in 1957, but not until 1964 was the club finally able to negotiate the sale of its old ground and establish itself at its current venue in Deacons Field, Redbourn Lane.

== 1965 to 1979 ==
It was one of the first clubs in the area to sell its ground for development and build a new, at that time, state of the art clubhouse. The new clubhouse opened in the 1964–65 season with three pitches, a brand new 5,000 sq ft (460 m^{2}) clubhouse and a grandstand; a far cry from two muddy pitches and two huts at Overstone Road. Two more pitches, a training area and a car park were added over the next few years. After much heart searching two squash courts were completed in 1968 with a third added in 1974 and additional accommodation added in 1979. The provision of squash courts allowed the Harpenden Squash Club, previously without a home in the town, to have a base.

== The 80's ==
In the 1980s floodlights were provided for the training pitch.

== 1990 and onward ==
A considerable force in County rugby over the years, the club suffered a few bleak seasons in the mid-1990s when it descended to Herts League 1. After some re-organisation, an amazing three seasons followed with the club being crowned Champions of Hertfordshire Division 1 (1995–96), Herts/Middlesex Division 1 (1996–97) and London 3NW (1997–98) ending the run in London 2N. Arguably, Harpenden's finest hour came on 3 May 1997 at Twickenham, winning the NPI Junior Cup. The intervening period has seen the club consolidate its position in the London leagues. This goal has not been helped by the, at that time, regular RFU reorganisation of the leagues (introducing a new London 4NW in 2000–01) meaning that following two steady seasons in London 2N, the club found itself back in 3NW in 2000, where it has remained since. In the abbreviated form of the game, the club has been the County leader carrying off the Hertfordshire County 7's title three times since 2003 – the winning squad representing Hertfordshire in the National County 7's each time. The colts team regularly contest the County Cup and have emulated the senior side by winning the Colts 7's in 2005, 2006 and 2007.

== Present ==
The club now run three senior men's sides, a colts side and has a mini and junior section catering for all age groups from 7 years to colts. 2016 saw the introduction of the Harpenden Ladies Senior team who compete in a merit league. The junior girls offer female only training sessions from age 12 and up.

== National Pub 7s ==
Harpenden RFC hosts the yearly National Pub 7s, a rugby 7s tournament run early July.NationalPubSevens web site In its 58th year (as at 2024) the tournament has hosted a wide range of teams including Germany national rugby sevens team, the British Army squad, along with a number of amateur teams from all over the country. 2015 was the first year a companion women's tournament was arranged, and is now known as the Hen 7s. The tournament was a great success with international players, including Lotte Clapp and Alex Matthews (rugby union), participating alongside their amateur teams.

== Honours ==
- Hertfordshire 1 champions: 1995–96
- Herts/Middlesex 1 champions: 1996–97
- NPI Junior Cup winners: 1997
- London 3 North West champions (2): 1997–98, 2008–09
- Herts County Sevens champions (3): 2013, 2014, 2015
- London 2 (north-east v north-west) promotion play-off winner: 2018–19

== See also ==
- London & SE Division RFU
- Hertfordshire RFU
