= Barnet Copthall =

Sports complex

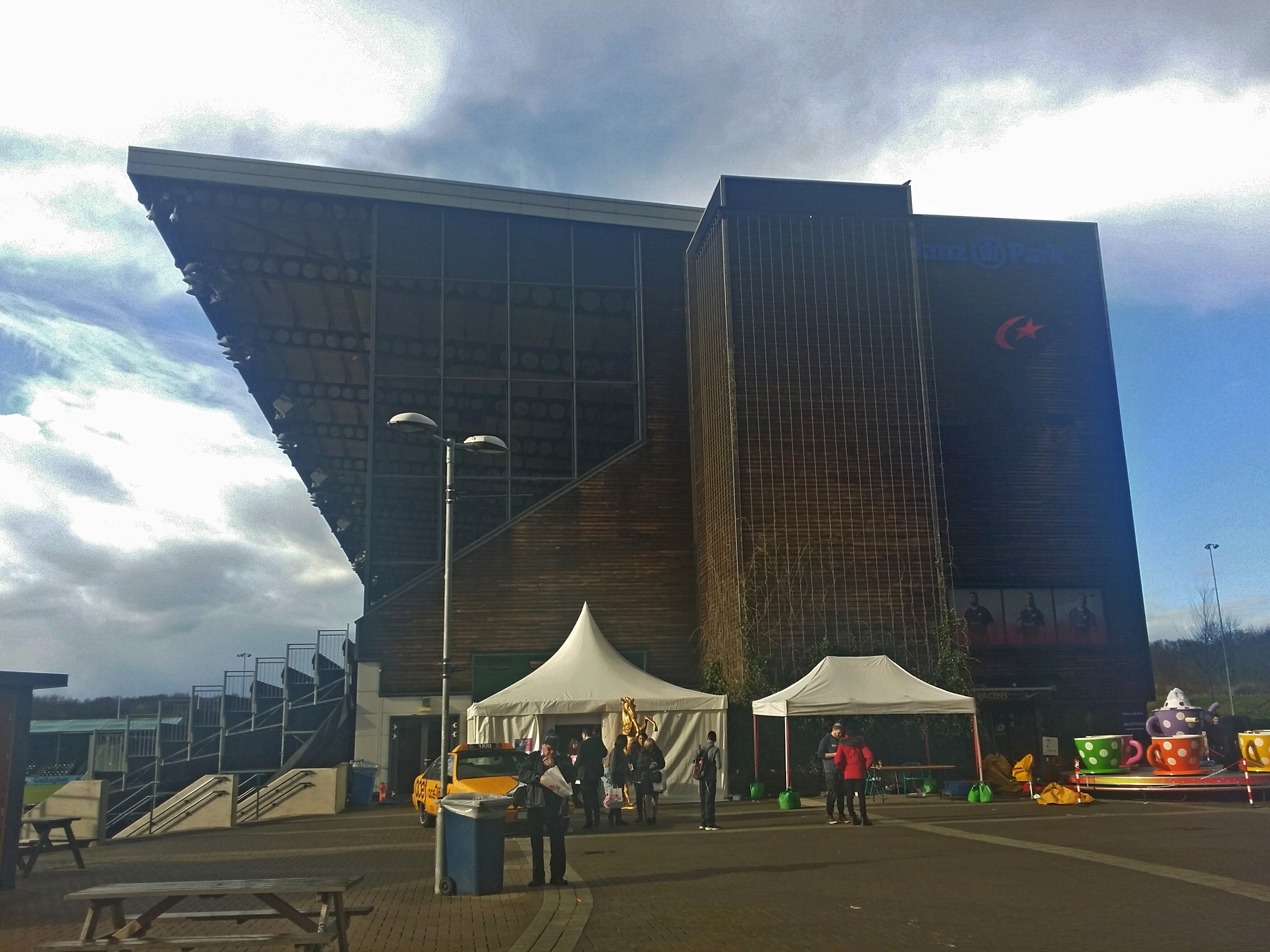
- StoneX Stadium, then known as Allianz Park
- Interactive map of Barnet Copthall
- Former names: Allianz Park (stadium); Copthall Stadium (stadium original name)
- Address: Champions Way, North Hendon; London, NW4; England
- Location: Hendon
- Coordinates: 51°36′13″N 0°13′25″W
- Owner: Barnet Council
- Operator: Barnet Council (Swimming pools and gym); Metro Golf (Driving Range & Golf Course); Saracens F.C. (Stadium)
- Capacity: 10,500 (seated)
- Type: Sports and Recreation
- Public transit: Mill Hill East; Edgware; Mill Hill Broadway

Website
- Leisure Centre; StoneX Stadium

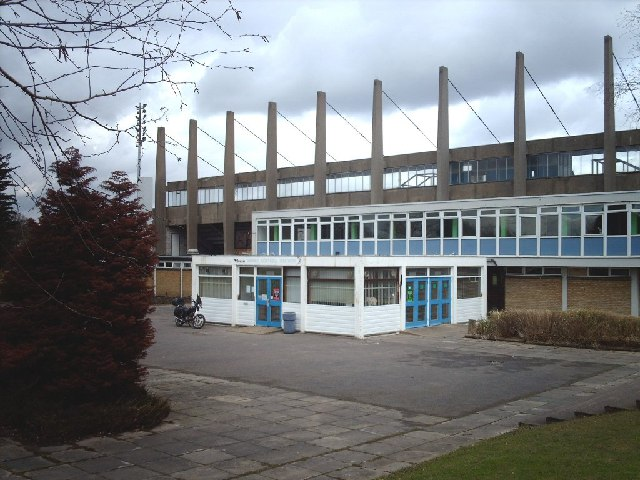
Copthall Stadium in 2006 before renovation

Barnet Copthall is a publicly owned sports venue on the Hendon-Mill Hill border in London. Since 2021, the venue's stadium has been known as StoneX Stadium for sponsorship reasons. It was known as Allianz Park from 2012 to 2020.

The venue houses several complexes, including a local authority-owned swimming pool and gymnasium facilities, a golf-driving range with 9 hole pitch and putt run by Metro Golf. The venue is primarily notable for its 10,500-seat main stadium which is home to rugby union Premiership side Saracens. While Saracens are the primary tenant, the stadium is a multi-use venue and has also previously been the home field of the London Broncos rugby league team as well as hosting American football events such as the British national championship game, BritBowl. The stadium can be expanded to 15,000 seats if required for certain major events, such as the final stages of the European Rugby Champions Cup.

Map of London showing Barnet Copthall Stadium

== History ==
=== Stadium ===
Prior to the involvement of Saracens, the stadium, then primarily an underdeveloped track and field athletics arena, achieved its greatest fame when London Crusaders (now the London Broncos) made it their home for three seasons of second division professional rugby league between 1993 and 1995.

The much improved stadium today is also home to two athletics clubs, Barnet & District AC and Shaftesbury Barnet Harriers. Before Saracens took over the stadium, it was also home to non-league football club Kentish Town.

In November 2010, Saracens, searching for a new home after their landlord Watford F.C. activated a break clause in their groundshare agreement, revealed they were in discussions with Barnet Borough Council about a move to the stadium. Under the plan, Saracens would redevelop the stadium into a modern facility with 3,000 permanent seats. De-mountable stands would allow a capacity of 10,000 for rugby matches while retaining the stadium's ability to host athletics events. Finally, the plans called for the use of an artificial pitch, the first in English rugby union.

Since final approval from Barnet Council was still required in May 2011, Saracens and Watford agreed to a one-season extension of the groundshare agreement. The project was approved in February 2012. The stadium opened in January 2013, after Saracens began the 2012–13 season as a nomadic club, using six different venues for home matches across all competitions (Twickenham, Wembley, Vicarage Road, Stadium MK, Goldington Road and King Baudouin Stadium).

On 25 January 2013, the newly renovated ground had its "soft opening", hosting its first Saracens match against the Cardiff Blues with Saracens winning 19–11 in the LV=Cup before a crowd limited to 3,500. The new artificial pitch was reported to be very good after the game. The full opening came on 16 February, with Saracens defeating Exeter Chiefs 31–11 in a Premiership match before a capacity crowd of 10,000.

On 15 March 2015, it hosted the start and finish of the first edition of the North London Half Marathon, which ran to Wembley Stadium and back.

On 25 June 2016, it hosted the gold medal matches for the Men's, Women's and Mixed divisions, and the bronze match for the Men's division, of the World Ultimate and Guts Championship. The preceding week of competition, and finals for Men's and Women's Masters, and Guts, was held at Watford FC's training ground.

On 2 April 2017, the stadium's capacity was expanded to 15,000 to meet capacity requirements for Saracens' European Champions' Cup quarter final match against Glasgow Warriors.

Due to major refurbishments designed to increase permanent base capacity to 10,500, the west stand was mostly closed for the 2019–20, 2020–21 and 2021–22 seasons, reducing the base capacity of the stadium to 8,500.

During COVID-19, the stadium was used as a vaccination centre.

The new completed west stand was named the 1876 Stand in November 2022.

==== Stadium naming rights ====
A sponsorship deal with German financial services company Allianz that included stadium naming rights, worth £8 million over six years, was announced on 24 July 2012. The deal, which saw the stadium renamed Allianz Park, was subsequently extended and scheduled to end in 2021. However, due to a serious breach of financial fair play rules by Saracens, in February 2020 Allianz announced its withdrawal from the arrangement and hence naming rights for the stadium and shirt sponsorship with Saracens would be terminated early.

The stadium officially reverted to its original name of Copthall Stadium on 26 October 2020.

In January 2021, Saracens announced a new four-year partnership with StoneX Group, which would see Copthall Stadium renamed StoneX Stadium.

== Transport ==
To arrive by public transport at Barnet Copthall the nearest Underground station is Mill Hill East, which is on the Northern line. On match days, a Saracens' Shuttle Bus runs from Edgware, Mill Hill East and Mill Hill Broadway stations to within walking distance of the stadium. An east-west bus service, the 221, stops at the same stop near the stadium (Pursley Road) and the north–south bus service, the 113, stops a short walking distance away from the stadium (Fiveways Corner).
