= Dublin Hospitals Rugby Cup =

Rugby union competition

- Sport: Rugby Union
- Founded: 1881
- First season: 1881
- No. of teams: 5 (season 2024)
- Venues: Lansdowne Football Club; Anglesea Road; Donnybrook Stadium
- Most recent champion: Beaumont Hospital (9)
- Most titles: St. Vincent's University Hospital (31)

The Dublin Hospitals Rugby Cup is a rugby union competition contested by the teaching hospitals in Dublin since 1881. The competition has a claim to the oldest rugby union competition in the world. The United Hospitals Cup in London was started 6 years earlier, but 12 years were not played during the periods of World War I and World War II.

== History ==
Sir Patrick Dun's defeat Mater at Lansdowne Road

The competition was inaugurated in 1881 by a group of Dublin surgeons and physicians. Dr Frank Cassidy served as the first president. The trophy was created by Paul Storr in 1812 as a hunting trophy. It was purchased in 1881 for £50. It remains the oldest sporting trophy in Ireland for which there is an annual competition.

The participants of the inaugural tournament included Richmond, Jervis Street, Sir Patrick Dun's, Royal City of Dublin Hospital, Adelaide, Mercer's Hospital, Dr Steevens' Hospital, and Meath. The inaugural title was won by the Meath Hospital who beat Sir Patrick Dun's Hospital at Lansdowne Road.

Predating the cup, Dublin United Hospitals representative sides played an annual charity match against other Dublin rugby clubs playing as 'County Dublin' in order to raise money for the Hospital Sunday Fund from 1878 until the 1950s.

The Dublin Hospitals representative sides have also played annual games against the London United Hospitals. London beat the Dublin hospitals at Lansdowne Road in 1894 inaugural game. The Dublin Hospitals won the matchup in 1910, 1912, 1924, 1928, and 1947.

Eligibility to play for hospitals was initially restricted to medical students and interns, this was later expanded to up to 6 graduates per team in 1990.

== Current competition ==
The final, previously played in February at Lansdowne Road, has been played in December at Anglesea Road since the 1960s. In recent years, following the closure and amalgamation of hospitals, five teams compete for the cup: Beaumont Hospital, the Mater Hospital, St. Vincent's University Hospital, the Federated Hospitals, and the Veterinary Hospital which joined in 2011.

The Dental Hospital, which had many memorable victories in the late 1950s and the 1970s, eventually could no longer field a team and joined forces with its Trinity neighbours. The Trinity Federated Hospitals team or Feds represent Dublin Dental University Hospital, Tallaght University Hospital, and St. James's Hospital. Richmond and Jervis amalgamated in 1973 to form an RCSI rugby club, which would win 8 championships during their 14 years in the competition. The side was succeeded by Beaumont in 1987 following the closure of both hospitals.

== International Rugby ==
Many medical students and newly qualified doctors who have played in the Hospitals Cup have gone on to represent Ireland or other countries at test level. This occurred more frequently during the early years of international rugby. Of the first 200 players capped for Ireland, 44 had trained in Dublin hospitals. Over 90 players have also been capped for Ireland. This list below includes some of those players:

Ireland Internationals

- Aidan Brady
- Barry Bresnihan (Mater)
- Lawrence Bulger (Richmond)
- Michael Joseph Bulger (Richmond)
- Emmet Byrne (Beaumont)
- Frank Byrne
- Andrew Clinch
- Jammie Clinch (United Dublin Hospitals Rugby Union)
- Morgan Crowe (Richmond Hospital)
- Thomas Crean (St. Vincent's)
- Denis Cussen
- Fergus Dunlea
- Con Feighery
- Tom Feighery
- Edmund Forrest
- Don Hingerty
- Niall Hogan (Beaumont)
- Paddy Johns (Dental, Feds)
- Louis Magee
- Jack Maloney
- Terence Millin (Dun's)
- Al Moroney
- Bill Mulcahy (St. Vincent's)
- Karl Mullen (Dun's)
- John Murray
- Paul Murray (Richmond Hospital)
- Kevin Quinn
- Hubie O'Connor (Dun's)
- Jim Murphy-O'Connor
- Frank O'Driscoll
- Charles Rooke
- Gerry Tormey

England Internationals

- Jon Raphael

Romania Internationals

- Mihai Vioreanu (Mater)

South Africa Internationals

- Nicolaas Jan Valkenburg van Druten (Meath)

United States Internationals

- Dick Cooke

== Winners ==
- 1881 Meath
- 1882 Meath
- 1883 Meath
- 1884 Dun's
- 1885 Dun's
- 1886 Dun's
- 1887 Dun's
- 1888 Dun's
- 1889 Dun's
- 1890 Meath
- 1891 Meath
- 1892 Meath
- 1893 Dun's
- 1894 Dun's
- 1895 Dun's
- 1896 Richmond
- 1897 Mater
- 1898 Dun's
- 1899 Mater
- 1900 Dun's
- 1901 Dun's
- 1902 Meath
- 1903 Dun's
- 1904 Dun's
- 1905 Dun's
- 1906 Adelaide
- 1907 Adelaide
- 1908 Adelaide
- 1909 Adelaide
- 1910 Adelaide
- 1911 Richmond
- 1912 Dun's
- 1913 St. Vincent's
- 1914 St. Vincent's
- 1915―19 Suspended
- 1920
- 1921 Meath
- 1922 Dun's
- 1923 Dental
- 1924 Richmond
- 1925 Richmond
- 1926 Richmond
- 1927 Dun's
- 1928 St. Vincent's
- 1929 Richmond
- 1930 Dun's
- 1931 Richmond
- 1932 Adelaide
- 1933 St. Vincent's
- 1934 Dun's
- 1935 Richmond
- 1936 St. Vincent's
- 1937 Mater
- 1938 Mater
- 1939 St. Vincent's
- 1940 Mater
- 1941 St. Vincent's
- 1942 Mater
- 1943 Richmond
- 1944 Richmond
- 1945 Mater
- 1946 Mater
- 1947 Jervis
- 1948 Jervis
- 1949 Jervis
- 1950 Adelaide
- 1951 Adelaide
- 1952
- 1953 Mater
- 1954 St. Vincent's
- 1955 Mater
- 1956 St. Vincent's
- 1957 Dun's
- 1958 Dun's
- 1959 Dental
- 1960 Dental
- 1961 St. Vincent's
- 1962 St. Vincent's
- 1963 Mater
- 1964 Mater
- 1965 St. Vincent's
- 1966 St. Vincent's
- 1967 Mater
- 1968 St. Vincent's
- 1969 St. Vincent's
- 1970 St. Vincent's
- 1971 Dental
- 1972 St. Vincent's
- 1973 Dental
- 1974 St. Vincent's
- 1975 St. Vincent's
- 1976 Richmond-Jervis
- 1977 Richmond-Jervis
- 1978 Dental
- 1979 Richmond-Jervis
- 1980 Dental
- 1981 Richmond-Jervis
- 1982 Richmond-Jervis
- 1983 Richmond-Jervis
- 1984 Richmond-Jervis
- 1985 Richmond-Jervis
- 1986 Federated
- 1987 Beaumont
- 1988 Beaumont
- 1989 Beaumont
- 1990 Beaumont
- 1991 Federated
- 1992 St. Vincent's
- 1993 St. Vincent's
- 1994 Beaumont
- 1995 St. Vincent's
- 1996 Mater
- 1997 St. Vincent's
- 1998 Mater
- 1999 St. Vincent's
- 2000 Mater
- 2001 Mater
- 2002 Mater
- 2003 Mater
- 2004 Mater
- 2005 Mater
- 2006 Mater
- 2007 Beaumont
- 2008 Beaumont
- 2009 St. Vincent's
- 2010 St. Vincent's
- 2011 St. Vincent's
- 2012 St. Vincent's
- 2013 St. Vincent's
- 2014 St. Vincent's
- 2015 Mater
- 2016 Mater
- 2017 Beaumont
- 2018 Mater
- 2019 Mater
- 2020 Cancelled
- 2021 Mater
- 2022 Mater
- 2023 St. Vincent's
- 2024 Federated
- 2025 Beaumont

== Roll of honour ==
Rank	Team	Wins	Years won
1	St. Vincent's University Hospital	31	1913, 1914, 1928, 1933, 1936, 1939, 1941, 1954, 1956, 1961, 1962, 1965, 1966, 1968, 1969, 1970, 1972, 1974, 1975, 1992, 1993, 1995, 1997, 1999, 2009, 2010, 2011, 2012, 2013, 2014, 2023
2	Mater Misericordiae University Hospital	28	1897, 1899, 1937, 1938, 1940, 1942, 1945, 1946, 1953, 1955, 1963, 1964, 1967, 1996, 1998, 2000, 2001, 2002, 2003, 2004, 2005, 2006, 2015, 2016, 2018, 2019, 2021, 2022
3	Sir Patrick Dun's Hospital	22	1884, 1885, 1886, 1887, 1888, 1889, 1893, 1894, 1895, 1898, 1900, 1901, 1902, 1903, 1904, 1905, 1912, 1922, 1927, 1930, 1934, 1957, 1958
4	Richmond Surgical Hospital	10	1896, 1911, 1924, 1925, 1926, 1929, 1931, 1935, 1943, 1944
5	Beaumont Hospital	9	1987, 1988, 1989, 1990, 1994, 2007, 2008, 2017, 2025
6	Richmond-Jervis (RCSI)	8	1976, 1977, 1979, 1981, 1982, 1983, 1984, 1985
6	Adelaide Hospital	8	1906, 1907, 1908, 1909, 1910, 1932, 1950, 1951
6	Meath Hospital	8	1881, 1882, 1883, 1890, 1891, 1892, 1902, 1921
9	Dublin Dental University Hospital	7	1923, 1959, 1960, 1971, 1973, 1978, 1980
10	Jervis Street Hospital	3	1947, 1948, 1949
10	Trinity Federated Hospitals	3	1986, 1991, 2024
Teams in italics are former participants.

== See also ==
- List of oldest rugby union competitions
- United Hospitals Cup
