= Barts and The London RFC =

English rugby union club, based in London

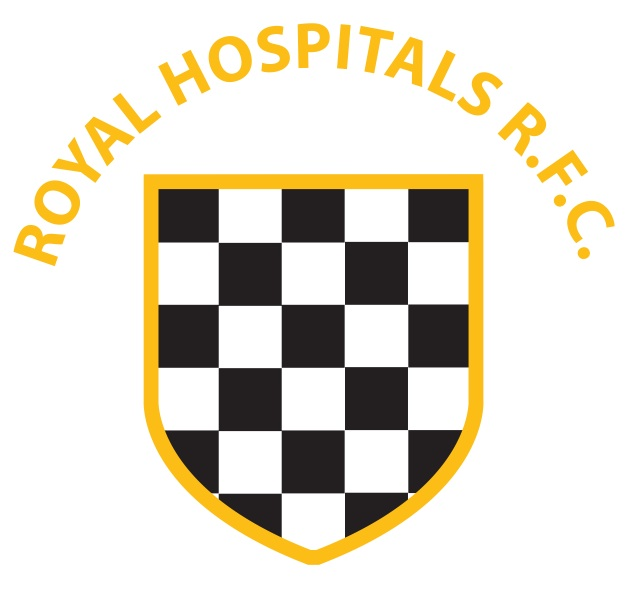
- Union: Middlesex RFU
- Founded: 1996 through merger of two older sides Constituent elements: 1865 – The Royal London Hospital FC; 1866 – St. Bartholomew's Hospital FC
- Location: Chislehurst, London, England
- Ground: Perry Street (Capacity: 500)
- Chairman: James Legg
- President: Professor Brian Colvin
Team kit

Barts and The London Rugby Football Club, also known as the Royal Hospitals Rugby Football Club, is the rugby club of Barts and The London School of Medicine and Dentistry. They have held the United Hospitals Cup, the oldest rugby cup competition in the world, for 3 years (2022–2024).

== History ==
The history of Barts and the London Rugby Club or Royal Hospitals RFC is the combined history of two older sides, and their joint history from the point of merger:

=== Royal London Hospital Rugby ===
The London Hospital Rugby Football Club was probably founded in 1866, not 1865 as was formerly believed. Using the Morpeth Castle Public House as their headquarters, they played their first home matches on fields in Victoria Park in East London. They adopted the first of their three strips, that of black jerseys with a cross on a red shield on the breast. This was changed to blue and white hoops and finally, in 1899, the once famous blue and white chequered pattern was adopted. Their first success in the United Hospitals Cup came at the expense of St Bartholomew's in 1884 when they won by two goals and two touchdowns to one goal and one touchdown. This occurred three years after the latter had outplayed them in the same fixture. The London was a highly regarded team on the metropolitan club circuit, before 1914 playing such opposition as London Welsh, London Scottish, London Irish, Northampton, Coventry, Bedford , Saracens, Rosslyn Park and Wasps. The club made the final of the Hospitals Cup fourteen times in sixteen years leading up to World War I and so good were they during this period that they had fielded eleven internationals.

Like many teams of the period, The London was deeply affected by losses sustained in the Great War but recovered reasonably quickly so that by the 1930s they were able to play at the highest level of rugby and fielded another four international players, including in the 1920s, G.V. Stephenson, a legendary figure who was capped 42 times by Ireland between 1920-1930.

1941 saw the arrival from Cambridge of Mike Floyer, who played for many years. He was devoted to the club throughout his life. He was club captain in 1943 and served as President from 1983-1986. In his honour, an annual fixture between current students of the Faculty of Medicine and Dentistry and former alumni is played, known as the Mike Floyer Memorial Match.

Rugby continued to be played during the 2nd World War although the fixture list was not the usual format and had a rather military flavour. At the end of the war the students were older than is usual in an essentially undergraduate team. Remarkably they even managed to organise a rugby tour in December 1945 to Clermont Ferrand in what had been Vichy France only a few months before. The London had a strong team with a fixture list that in 1950-51 included Nottingham, Birmingham, Rugby, Metropolitan Police, Abertillery, Rosslyn Park, Bristol, Cheltenham, Stroud, Exeter, London Welsh, London Irish, Bedford, Wasps, Blackheath and other excellent teams of slightly lower ranking. In the 1960-61 season, ten years later when the 1st XV had a predominance of older students and qualified doctors but with a few young players, the fixture list included Bedford, Bristol, Rugby, Exeter, Metropolitan Police, Taunton, Tredegar, Cross Keys, Oxford University Greyhounds and Cambridge University LX Club, Saracens being beaten 6-3. By 1969-70 the fixture list still included Cross Keys, Tredegar, Exeter, Birmingham, Cambridge LX and Oxford Greyhounds but the other fixtures had begun to reflect the largely undergraduate nature of the team. The London lost only 9 games out of 38, drawing 2. After the 1980s, although the Medical College continued to have some excellent rugby players, they often played in senior clubs, only playing for The London in Hospitals Cup matches. The fixture list gradually became more student orientated as the proportion of female medical students rose from 10% in 1959 to 50% and above.

When the league system was introduced by the Rugby Football Union in the 1987/88 season, The London was placed in the Eastern Counties 5, but there is no record of the fixture list in 1986/87 that would have determined this. The Club won the Eastern Counties League 5 in 1988-89 and by 1989-90 had been promoted to Eastern Counties 3. They remained in that League until 1993-4 but then left.

Another post war life-long servant of the club was David Lightowler, who arrived at The London from the Army in 1956, already a Yorkshire trialist. He was in the teams that won the Hospitals cup in 1956 and the epic win against Guy’s in 1968, an unusual span in Hospitals rugby of 12 years. He was club captain in 1960, vice-captain of United Hospitals and played for Eastern Counties. He became President of the club in 1991 until 1995 when he steered the club into the difficult merger with St Bartholomew’s and was the first President of the Royal Hospitals RFC.

=== St Bartholomew's Hospital Rugby Club ===
According to the Rugby Football Union, St Bartholomew's Hospital rugby team was formed in October 1866, and were quickly established as a London club.

The first known Minutes of the Club are recorded in a book, currently in the Hospital archives, start with the 1873-74 season. R Wharry was captain and at the same meeting a motion was passed that the uniform of the club be changed from a dark blue jersey with the hospital arms on the left breast and dark blue velvet cap with silver tassel, to a white jersey bound with black having the hospital arms in black on the left breast and a black velvet wrap without a tassel. It was also agreed to retain the West Lodge Battersea Park on the same conditions as before, namely £3.15 shillings, for the use of two rooms, firing, candles, soap etc and for keeping the polls during the summer months.

During the season there were 12 first team matches and three second team games. The list of matches mainly included other hospitals but also included Epsom College

There were 55 ‘subscribers’ to the Club. By 1880 there were 79 Playing members and 113 Honorary members

In the 1874-75 Season five members of the Club played for United Hospitals, and similar numbers played for U H in subsequent years.

The Inter-Hospitals Cup was started a year later in 1875, the first games were played in February, and the winning Hospital would be called the “Champion Hospital”. Bart’s won the first of their nine Hospitals Cups in 1881, playing against the team they would later merge with, the London, and winning by a very large margin: two goals, seven tries and numerous touch-downs to one touch-down. Victories for Bart’s followed in 1883, 1924, 1928, and 1931, when W. M. Capper was Captain. A long fallow period followed, apart from reaching the finals but losing to Guy’s in 1933, to the London in 1957, and to St Mary’s in 1959.

By the time of the Centenary Year, in 1966, rugby at Bart’s had begun to flourish again, principally due to the efforts of the Dean, Mr John Cope. Over 200 people were playing, and at the start of the season up to eight teams were fielded, with the junior teams distinguished by a variety of names including ‘Vandals’, ‘Wanderers’, ‘Casuals’ and ‘Veterans’.

In 1969, the first team, under the captaincy of Keith McIntyre, gained a place in the final of the Hospitals’ Cup beating their old rivals Guy’s who'd knocked them out of the semi-finals the year prior, winning 11-3 and taking the Cup for the first time for thirty-eight years.

The following year, 1970, with Mark Britton as Captain, both the 1st XV and the ‘A’ XV beat Guy’s in their respective finals, – only the third time the double had been achieved in Bart’s history. The 1st XV score on this occasion was a convincing 15-0. In the same year Barts reached the Middlesex Sevens finals day at Twickenham. Both successful Cup teams included a Welsh International, an England trialist, two Oxbridge ‘blues’ and several county players.

The finals held at Richmond were noted for the battle – prior to kick-off – between rival supporters who hurled bags of plaster of Paris and soot. Percy, the Bart’s mascot, featured prominently in these battles. The day before the 1970 final, the pavilion walls and stands were daubed with the slogan ‘Bart’s for the Cup’, and the hospital subsequently received a bill for £500 for repainting and cleaning! One journalist commented that the pre-match battle was more exciting than the rugby. Cup matches were, more often than not, wars of attrition in muddy conditions.

As well as winning competitions, the Club always had another goal, namely to have successful and enjoyable tours, usually more of the latter than the former. The main purpose of the tour was to engender some team spirit before the Cup matches. The trip to Devon and Cornwall was always at the beginning of November, which ensured that post-match activities rivaled the Gunpowder Plot. Naturally, it became increasingly difficult for the Secretary to find suitable accommodation for subsequent tours.

Back to the field, 1976 saw success when, under the leadership of John Frappell, the double was again achieved. This success continued the next year, with Peter Gough as Captain, when the 1st XV beat Mary’s in the Hospitals’ Cup final and again reached the final day of the Middlesex Sevens.

Further success proved elusive and in 1995 the teams from Bart’s and the London merged. In the Club’s 129-year history, the Hospitals’ Cup was won on nine occasions, with 24 appearances in the final, and the Junior Cup was won on eight occasions.

=== 1995 onwards – post-merger ===
The teams from Royal London Hospital and St Bartholomew's Hospital merged in 1995 following the union of St Bartholomew's Hospital Medical College and the London Hospital Medical College with Queen Mary and Westfield College, now known as Queen Mary, University of London to form St Bartholomew's and the Royal London School of Medicine and Dentistry. The two Medical Schools who were once arch rivals were to come together to try to provide the highest quality Medical Education. Likewise, Barts and the London Rugby Club or Royal Hospitals RFC was formed. BLRFC until 2001 played their matches at Hale End (The London's Old Ground) and have since played at Chislehurst (Bart's Old Ground) which is now known as The Queen Mary University of London ground. In 2012, Royal Hospitals RFC won the United Hospitals Cup, the oldest cup competition in rugby, and defended their title in 2013. In the 2013–14 season, with a record of only one loss, they were promoted to the Southern Premiership 1b league of BUCS for the first time. In 2017, Royal Hospitals RFC won the United Hospitals Cup again with a tense 14–10 victory against Imperial Medicals at Ealing Trailfinders RFC. That season, they went undefeated to gain promotion to BUCS South Western 1a. Despite making the United Hospitals Cup final a further two times over the next three years, Royal Hospitals were unable to regain the Cup, until a spirited performance in 2022 saw them take the Cup home with a 22–12 victory over GKT. The victory was all the more impressive given Royal Hospitals had been trailing for 72 minutes of the match, before two tries in the dying minutes ensured a comeback win.

== Team colours ==
The current colours are an amalgamation of the two clubs. Barts used to play in black and white hoops (their second strip) whereas the London had settled on blue and white chequers at the beginning of the twentieth century. The club's 1st XV therefore play in black and white chequers, one of a few in the country to play in such chequered shirts. The 2nd XV play in blue and black hoops.

== Competition ==
The team competes every year in the United Hospitals Cup with the other London Medical Schools, RUMS, Imperial Medics RFC, GKT & St Georges as well as Royal Veterinary College. The cup is the oldest rugby cup competition in the world. The trophy has been won by The Royal London on 11 occasions (the last in 1986) and by Barts 9 times (the last in 1977). Royal Hospitals RFC are the current UH cup champions for the second year in a row. This season they beat St. Georges Hospital Medical School RFC in the final and Imperial College Medical School RFC the previous year. Club's Official site – History of BLRFC

United Hospital Challenge Cup wins
Hospital Team	First Competed	Last Competed	Current Status	Wins	Total Wins including constituent elements
London	1874	1995	Part of Royal Hospitals RFC	11	11
St Bart’s	1875	1995	Part of Royal Hospitals RFC	9	9
Royal Hospitals RFC	1996	present	Active	8	28

In 2008 they won the UH 7-a-side tournament, beating Imperial Medics in the final. They also compete in the British University and College Sports (BUCS) Leagues. They finished in 1st place of the BUCS Southeastern 2B Division at the end of the 2009–10 season followed by third in BUCS Southeastern 1A in 2010. As well as this they compete in the National Association of Medics' Sports 7-a-side tournament and placed 2nd, narrowly losing to Nottingham Medics in the final in 2009.

Since the merge of Barts and the London Medical School with Queen Mary, University of London, the rugby club has also participated in the Merger Cup.

== Internationals ==
Over the years the club and its predecessor clubs have fostered in total seven international players who have played for their countries whilst being members of the hospital sides.(source for below)

=== The London ===
- (Scotland) Hugh Monteith (1905)
- (England) Alex Palmer (1909)
- (England) Alan Adams (1910)
- (Scotland) Bill Stewart (1913–14)

former players capped whilst playing for other clubs'

- (Scotland) Bruce Thomson (1953)
- (Wales) David Burcher (1977)
- Hugh Condon (1984)

=== St Bartholomew's ===
- (England) Leonard Tosswill (1902)
- (Wales) Beriah Melbourne Gwynne Thomas(1919–24)
- (England) Andy Dun (1984)

former players capped whilst playing for other clubs'

- (Wales) Edward Treharne (1881–83)
- (England) Howard Marshall (1891–93)

=== Barts & The London RFC ===
- (Singapore) Laurence Gardner (2015)

== Honours ==
London Hospital

- Eastern Counties 5 champions: 1988–89
- Eastern Counties 4 champions: 1989–90

Royal Hospitals

- Middlesex 4 champions: 1995–96
