= United Hospitals RFC =

English rugby union team, based in London

- Full name: United Hospitals Rugby Football Club
- Union: Middlesex RFU
- Nickname: UH
- Founded: 1867; 159 years ago
- Location: London, England
- President: Martin Griffiths
- Captain: Aadil Ali
Team kit

The United Hospitals Rugby Football Club represents the five medical schools in London, each of whom have their own distinct rugby clubs but from whom are picked a select fifteen to compete for UHRFC. The club exists to encourage and facilitate rugby at these institutions. It hosts the United Hospitals Cup, the oldest rugby cup competition in the world.

== History ==
In 1871 the Rugby Football Union was formed, the first such organisation for rugby football in the world. However, rugby itself had been slowly but steadily evolving for a number of decades before that point since its inception in the 1820s. The game, with a variety of interpretations over the rules employed, had become popular in many of the public schools of the British Isles and this had extended to the universities as well. The established medical schools of the time were no exception and among the students within these schools was a desire to continue playing the sport of their school days. The medical schools of London had rugby clubs that were among the earliest founded, with Guy's Hospital said to have the oldest rugby club in the world having been founded in 1843. With the rise of more clubs there was an expansion in the number of matches played and in 1867 the United Hospitals RFC was formed, which brought together on an invitational basis, representatives of the various London hospitals for matches against established teams, such as Cambridge University. They played an annual game against the Dublin Hospitals from the late 19th century until the 1980s.

=== United Hospitals Challenge Cup ===
In 1874 the United Hospitals instituted the oldest cup competition in the game of rugby, the United Hospitals Challenge Cup, also known as the Inter-Hospital Challenge Cup, and is the oldest cup competition in the game of rugby. The first final was played on Wednesday 3 March 1875 at The Oval between Guy's Hospital and St George's Hospital with Guy's winning by 1 Goal (a converted try) and 1 try to 2 tries. With the exception of breaks for the two world wars of the twentieth century, the United Hospitals Challenge Cup has been played for without interruption since that first final.

=== Present state ===
The status and quality of the individual medical schools teams has varied considerably since their individual inception dates. Since the United Hospitals FC was formed, the institutions that are represented by the member teams have been through considerable change, and hand-in-hand with these changes in the institutions have been changes in the teams that represent them. Thus, the Royal London Hospital RFC (formed in 1864) and the Barts Hospital RFC (formed in 1866) in 1996 formed Royal Hospitals RFC when the institutions merged. Similar stories sit behind the mergers of University College Hospital RFC, Middlesex Hospital RFC and Royal Free Hospital RFC in 1998 to form RUMS RFC, St Mary's Hospital RFC and Charing Cross & Westminster Hospitals RFC to form Imperial Medicals RFC in 1997, and Guy's Hospital FC, St Thomas' Hospital RFC and Guy's and St. Thomas' RFC to form Guy's, King's and St Thomas' Rugby Football Club that is now recognised as King's College London Medical School. The exception to the tide of mergers and renaming is St George’s RFC which is still a stand-alone institution, although it has moved premises.

Some of these teams were once in the very top level of English rugby with Guy's in particular being potentially the best club in England for parts of the 1920s and 30s. In recent years the demographic changes within the schools have resulted in an overall decline in the number of rugby players and the advent of the league system within rugby union reflected a perceived decline in the quality of rugby played. The United Hospitals Team itself has been reflective of the quality within its constituent parts. Currently, Royal Hospitals RFC and RUMS RFC are the highest ranked rugby union sides of the six schools, playing in BUCS 1A. All teams play in the BUCS leagues at varying levels.

After being proposed for membership in 2008, The Royal Veterinary College joined the United Hospitals in 2009.

Unfortunately due to the rise of the individual school clubs and the commitment to their respective leagues, the UH team has declined over recent years and is no longer the force it once was, but still has a place in London rugby.

In December 2013, Sydney University Football Club played UH RFC as part of their 150th Anniversary Tour to the UK. Sydney University are the oldest rugby club outside of the UK, and were touring the UK playing clubs older than themselves. UH, which has as one of its components Guy's Hospital RFC, the oldest club in the world (founded 1843), played the tourists at Blackheath's ground. A mammoth turn out from all UH clubs made it a large event, and though the tourists won convincingly, it was a spectacle showing UH is by no means ready to roll over.

== Members ==
=== Current members ===
United Hospital Members
Hospital Team	Crest	Established	Medical School	Hospital(s) represented	Constituent elements (Joined)
GKT RFC		1999	King's College London School of Medicine and Dentistry	Guy's Hospital · King's College Hospital · St Thomas's Hospital	Guy's Hospital RFC (1874); King's College Hospital RFC (1874); St. Thomas' Hospital RFC (1874)
ICSM RFC		1997	Imperial College School of Medicine	Charing Cross Hospital · Chelsea and Westminster Hospital · St Mary's Hospital, London · Hammersmith Hospital	St Mary's Hospital RFC (1874); Charing Cross Hospital RFC (1874); Westminster Hospitals RFC (1874)
Royal Hospitals RFC		1996	Barts and The London School of Medicine and Dentistry	St Bartholomew's Hospital · Royal London Hospital	The Royal London Hospital RFC (1864); St. Bartholomew's Hospital RFC (1875)
RUMS RFC		1998	UCL Medical School	University College Hospital · The Royal Free Hospital · The Whittington Hospital	Royal Free Hospital RFC (?); University College Hospital RFC (?); Middlesex Students RFC (1874)
Royal Veterinary College RFC		2009	Royal Veterinary College	Royal Veterinary College	Royal Veterinary College RFC (2009)
St George’s RFC		1863	St George's, University of London	St George's Hospital · St Helier Hospital	St. George's Hospital RFC (1874)

=== Members merged into current participants ===
- The Royal London Hospital RFC (formed in 1864 - in 1996 formed Royal Hospitals RFC)
- Barts Hospital RFC (formed in 1866 - in 1996 formed Royal Hospitals RFC)
- University College Hospital RFC (in 1998 formed RUMS RFC)
- Middlesex Hospital RFC (Founded in 1874 - in 1998 formed RUMS RFC)
- Royal Free Hospital RFC (in 1998 formed RUMS RFC)
- St Mary's Hospital RFC (founded 1865 - in 1997 formed Imperial Medics RFC)
- Charing Cross & Westminster Hospitals RFC (founded 1984 through merger - in 1997 formed Imperial Medics RFC)
- Charing Cross Hospital FC (founded pre-1868) - in 1984 formed Charing Cross and Westminster RFC
- Westminster Hospital FC - in 1984 formed Charing Cross and Westminster RFC
- Guy's Hospital FC (founded 1843 now part of GKT)
- St Thomas' Hospital RFC (founded 1867 now part of GKT)
- Guy's and St. Thomas' RFC (founded 1990 now part of GKT)

=== Lapsed members ===
- King's College Hospital RFC (founded 1869)

== Other competitions ==
The United Hospitals also host a cup for the 2nd and 3rd XVs of its member teams, as well as a United Hospital Cup Sevens tournament. In addition there is a United Hospitals Plate.

== See also ==
- List of oldest rugby union competitions
