= Bruce Thomson =

Bruce Thomson may refer to:

- Bruce Thomson (footballer) (born 1955), Australian former rules footballer
- Bruce Thomson (rugby union) (born 1930), Scottish former international rugby union player

== See also ==
- Bruce Thompson (disambiguation)
