= List of oldest rugby union competitions =

The following article lists the oldest known rugby union competitions.

Rank	Competition	Location	Date	First winner	First Runner-up	Ref
1	United Hospitals Challenge Cup	The Oval	1874	Guy's Hospital	St George's Hospital	
1	Shute Shield	Sydney	1874	Waratah		
3	Ulster Schools' Cup	Ulster	1876	The Royal School, Armagh	Royal Belfast Academical Institution	
4	Yorkshire Cup	Recreation Ground, Holbeck	1877	Halifax	York	
5	Calcutta Cup	Raeburn Place	1879	Scotland	England	
6	Dublin Hospitals Rugby Cup	Ireland	1881	Meath Hospital	Sir Patrick Dun's Hospital	
7	Home Nations Championship	England, Scotland, Wales, Ireland, France, Italy	1883	England	Scotland	
8	Leinster Towns Cup	Ireland	1888	Blackrock College RFC		
9	Currie Cup	South Africa	1889	Western Province		
10	French Championship	Bagatelle, Paris	1892	Racing Club de France	Stade Français	
11	Mallett Cup	Cardiff	1893	Cardiff RFC Reserves	Canton RFC	
12	Mulock Cup (University of Toronto Intramural Championship)	Toronto	1895	Faculty of Medicine		
13	River Plate Rugby Championship	Argentina	1899	Lomas Athletic Club	Buenos Aires Football Club	
14	Bottle Match	United Kingdom	1902	Camborne School of Mines	Royal School of Mines	
15	Ranfurly Shield	New Zealand	1904	Wellington	Auckland	
16	Clifford Cup	Sri Lanka	1911	United Services	All Ceylon	
17	Siam Cup	Channel Islands	1920	Jersey	Guernsey	
18	Deans Trophy	Fiji	1939	Queen Victoria School		
