= Middlesex 4 =

English rugby union league

- Sport: Rugby union
- Instituted: 1988; 38 years ago
- Ceased: 1996; 30 years ago
- Number of teams: 6
- Country: England
- Holders: Royal Hospitals (1st title) (1995–96) (promoted to Herts/Middlesex 4)

Middlesex 4 was an English level 13 Rugby Union league with teams from north-west London taking part. Promoted teams moved up to Middlesex 3 and since the cancellation of Middlesex 5 at the end of the 1991–92 season there was no relegation. The division was cancelled in at the end of the 1995–96 campaign after nine seasons due to the merger of the Hertfordshire and Middlesex regional leagues.

== Original teams ==
When the division was created in 1988 it contained the following teams:

- Actonians - relegated from Middlesex 3 South (6th)
- Bank of England - relegated from Middlesex 3 South (5th)
- Enfield Ignatians - N/A (Note: Enfield Ignatians was a newly created club resulting from the merger of Enfield Old Grammarians and Old Ignatians RFC - both of whom were relegated from Middlesex 3 North at the end of the 1987–88 season (10th and 7th respectively).)
- Feltham - relegated from Middlesex 3 South (8th)
- Hayes - relegated from Middlesex 3 South (10th)
- London French - relegated from Middlesex 3 South (7th)
- Meadhurst - relegated from Middlesex 3 South (9th)
- Roxeth Manor Old Boys - relegated from Middlesex 3 North (6th)
- S.T. and C. - relegated from Middlesex 3 North (9th)
- UCS Old Boys - relegated from Middlesex 3 North (7th)

== Middlesex 4 honours ==
The original Middlesex 4 was a tier 11 league. Promotion was up to Middlesex 3 and relegation was down to Middlesex 5.

=== Middlesex 4 (1988–1992) ===
Middlesex 4
Season	No of Teams	Champions	Runners–up	Relegated Teams
1988–89	10	Bank of England	Meadhurst	S.T. and C., Hayes
1989–90	11	Enfield Ignatians	Roxeth Manor Old Boys	Actonians, Royal Free Hospital
1990–91	11	HAC	Feltham	Hayes
1991–92	11	Actonians (Note: Champions Actonians were promoted two levels up into Middlesex 2 due to restructuring as a result of the introduction of the new Herts/Middlesex division for the following season.)	Belsize Park (Note: Runners up Belsize Park along with 3rd and 4th placed Barclays Bank and London Cornish were also promoted two levels up into Middlesex 1. Teams ranked 5th to 11th were promoted into Middlesex 3 as part of the league restructuring.)	No relegation (Note: The cancellation of Middlesex 5 at the end of the season meant there was no relegation.)
Green backgrounds are promotion places.

=== Middlesex 4 (1992–1996) ===
The creation of Herts/Middlesex at the beginning of the 1992–93 season meant that Middlesex 4 dropped to become a tier 12 league. The introduction of National 5 South for the 1993–94 season meant that Middlesex 4 dropped another level to become a tier 13 league for the years that National 5 South was active. Promotion continued to Middlesex 3 but the cancellation of Middlesex 5 at the end of the 1991–92 season meant there was no longer relegation. The merging of the Hertfordshire and Middlesex regional divisions at the end of the 1995–96 season meant that Middlesex 4 was cancelled.

Middlesex 3
Season	No of Teams	Champions	Runners–up	Relegated Teams
1992–93	9	London Nigerian	London Exiles	No relegation
1993–94	9	London French	Southgate	No relegation
1994–95	8	Quintin	British Airways	No relegation
1995–96	6	Royal Hospitals	Middlesex Hospital	No relegation
Green backgrounds are promotion places.

== Number of league titles ==
- Actonians (1)
- Bank of England (1)
- Enfield Ignatians (1)
- HAC (1)
- London French (1)
- London Nigerian (1)
- Quintin (1)
- Royal Hospitals (1)

== See also ==
- London & SE Division RFU
- Middlesex RFU
- English rugby union system
- Rugby union in England
