= Hugh Orr =

Australian-born English cricketer

- Born: Hugh James Orr; 21 January 1878 Deniliquin, New South Wales, Australia
- Died: 16 May 1946 (aged 68) Wandsworth, London, England

Rugby union career
- Position: Centre
Amateur team(s)
Years	Team	Apps	(Points)
- London Scottish
Provincial / State sides
Years	Team	Apps	(Points)
1902-03	Anglo-Scots		
International career
Years	Team	Apps	(Points)
1903-04	Scotland	5	(3)
- Cricket career

Cricket information

Domestic team information
- Years: Team
- 1902–1907: Hampshire

Career statistics
Competition	First-class
Matches	7
Runs scored	85
Batting average	7.08
100s/50s	0/0
Top score	13
Balls bowled	680
Wickets	19
Bowling average	24.63
5 wickets in innings	1
10 wickets in match	0
Best bowling	7/74
Catches/stumpings	2/–
- Source: CricInfo, 5 October 2025

Hugh James Orr (21 January 1878 – 19 April 1946) was an Australian-born Scottish first-class cricketer, rugby union player and Royal Navy officer.

Orr was born in January 1878 at Deniliquin, New South Wales. He was educated privately at Sydney, before immigrating to the United Kingdom. Once there, he joined the Royal Navy and was commissioned as an acting sub-lieutenant in April 1898, before being confirmed in the rank in June 1899. In November 1899, he was promoted to lieutenant. A talented sportsman, Orr played first-class cricket and rugby union. In rugby union, he played as a centre. He was capped by the Anglo-Scots in 1902 against the South of Scotland District. He played for the Anglo-Scots in the same fixture in the 1903 season, scoring a try. He was also capped by Scotland, making five Test appearances from 1903 to 1904, and was a member of the Scottish team which won the 1903 Home Nations Championship, and played for Scotland in the following season's 1904 Home Nations Championship, which they also won.

As a cricketer, he played first-class cricket for Hampshire, making his debut against Gloucestershire at Portsmouth in the 1902 County Championship. Orr played a further match in 1902, before his next appearance in 1907, with him making four appearances in that seasons County Championship. Playing in the Hampshire team as a bowler, he took 11 wickets at an average of 32.72, with best figures of 3 for 34. He later played in a single first-class match for the Royal Navy against the British Army cricket team at Lord's, taking figures of 7 for 74 in the Army second innings, having taken a single wicket in their first innings. Orr retired from the navy at his own request in May 1912. Orr was friends with Robert Falcon Scott, who attempted to persuade him to accompany him on his Antarctic expeditions; however, Orr was dissuaded from doing so by his wife. He returned to active service during the First World War, during which he held the rank of lieutenant commander. He was appointed a commander in January 1918. Orr died in England at Wandsworth in April 1946.
