= John Biggs (rugby union) =

John Maundy Biggs
- Born: October 24, 1855 Reading, Berkshire, England
- Died: June 3, 1935 (aged 79) Barnstaple, Devon, England
- Occupation: Surgeon

Rugby union career
- Position: Forward
Amateur team(s)
Years	Team	Apps	(Points)
–	Wasps RFC		
–	University College Hospital / United Hospitals		
–	Reindeer RFC		
International career
Years	Team	Apps	(Points)
1878–1879	England	2	(0)

John Maundy Biggs (24 October 1855 – 3 June 1935) was an English surgeon and rugby union international who represented the England national team in the late nineteenth century. He played as a forward and was associated with Wasps RFC and the United Hospitals side representing the London medical schools.

== Early life ==
Biggs was born on 24 October 1855 in Reading, Berkshire, and was baptised at St Giles' Church, Reading on 1 December 1855.

He was the son of John Grace Biggs (1818–1891) and Anne Kitcat (1818–1863). His father has been a farmer of around 80 acres in Berkshire, just before Biggs was born. By the time he was six years old the family had moved to Swansea, Glamorgan, where his father was a colliery manager. After the death of his mother in 1863, the family later moved to Portsea, Hampshire, where his father was able to make a living on income from dividends.

Biggs trained as a medical practitioner in London, qualifying with the professional credentials LRCP, MRCS (Eng), and LSA. By 1881 he was practising as a general practitioner at Sunnyside Villas, Child's Hill, on the border of Hampstead and Hendon.

== Rugby career ==
Biggs played rugby union during the formative years of the sport in the 1870s while studying medicine in London. One of the earliest references to his playing career occurs in March 1876, when he appeared for Wasps RFC in a match against Richmond. Contemporary reporting noted that “Biggs (forward) played remarkably well for the Wasps.”

By 1878 he had become a prominent member of the Wasps side. A report of the club's opening match of the season at Putney lists “J. Biggs (captain)”, indicating that he served as captain of Wasps during that period.

Biggs was also associated with the rugby team of University College Hospital, part of the United Hospitals club representing the London medical schools. In 1892, the former England international Montague Shearman recalled a strong United Hospitals side that included “E. B. Turner and J. M. Biggs” among the forwards in a match played against Oxford.

His connection with the hospital club was also reflected in his England selection. When the team to play Scotland at the Kennington Oval in March 1878 was announced, Biggs was listed as “J. Biggs (University College Hospital)”.

He won two international caps for England, playing as a forward against Scotland on 4 March 1878 and against Ireland on 30 March 1879, both matches being played at the Kennington Oval.

Biggs continued to play club rugby after his international appearances. In October 1880 he appeared for the London club Reindeer RFC in a match against the Royal Naval Hospital School at Greenwich Park.

== Medical career ==
After his rugby career Biggs practised medicine as a surgeon and general practitioner in north London. He lived at Child's Hill near Hampstead, where he established his medical practice.

In October 1890 he gave medical evidence during the inquest into the murder of Phoebe Hogg and her child in Hampstead. Biggs examined the child's body and testified that the cause of death was suffocation.

== Personal life ==
On 28 November 1882 Biggs married Florence Elizabeth Hopkinson at Holy Trinity Church, Taunton, Somerset.

The couple had several children, including Arthur Cecil Barker Biggs (1885–1976), a surgeon and Fellow of the Royal College of Surgeons of England; John Geoffrey Biggs (1888–1917), a lieutenant in the North Somerset Yeomanry and later the Machine Gun Corps who was awarded the Military Cross and Bar and was killed during the First World War; and Kenneth Biggs (1890–1988), a lieutenant in the Royal Army Medical Corps.

== Death ==
Biggs died on 3 June 1935 at Barnstaple in Devon.
