= Simon Holmes =

Simon Holmes may refer to:

- Simon Hugh Holmes (1831–1919), Canadian conservative politician
- Simon Holmes (guitarist) (1963–2017), lead singer and guitarist with the Australian rock band The Hummingbirds
- Simon Holmes (rugby union) (born 1966), Scottish rugby union player
