= George Turner (rugby union, born 1855) =

Sir George Robertson Turner
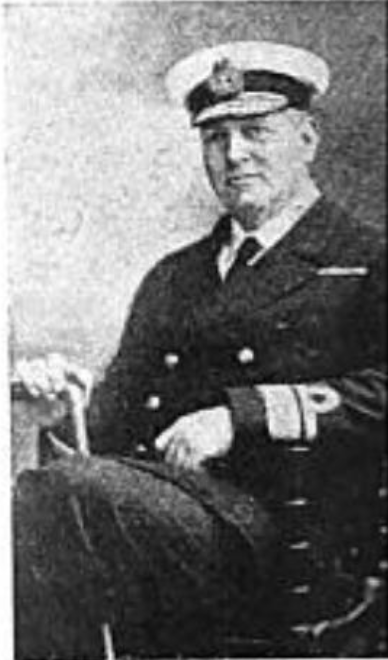
- Full name: George Robertson Turner
- Born: October 22, 1855 Chigwell, Essex, England
- Died: April 7, 1941 (aged 85) Hove, Sussex, England
- School: Uppingham School
- University: St George's Hospital Medical School

Rugby union career
- Position: Forward
Amateur team(s)
Years	Team	Apps	(Points)
–	St George's Hospital		
–	United Hospitals		
International career
Years	Team	Apps	(Points)
1876	England	1	

Sir George Robertson Turner KBE CB FRCS (22 October 1855 – 7 April 1941) was an English surgeon and rugby union international who played for the England national rugby union team in 1876. Educated at Uppingham School and St George's Hospital Medical School, he played rugby for St George's Hospital and the United Hospitals before representing England.

== Early life and family ==
Turner was born on 22 October 1855 at Chigwell in Essex. He was the son of George Turner, MRCS, a surgeon who practised in London near Hyde Park Corner, and his wife Hannah (née Buchanan). He was baptised at St Mary the Virgin, Chigwell on 12 December 1855.

He grew up in a medical family and had several siblings. His elder brother, Edward Beadon Turner (1854–1931), also became a surgeon and represented England at rugby union. Their sisters included Catherine Mary Turner (1856–1871) and Edith Sophia Turner (1857–1886).

In the 1861 census he was recorded living with his parents and siblings at Paddington, Middlesex.

Turner was educated at Uppingham School before entering St George's Hospital Medical School in 1873. Turner was also an accomplished athlete during his student years. At the inter-hospital athletic meetings he won the Inter-Hospitals hurdles for three consecutive years and in 1876 finished second in the quarter-mile event.

== Rugby career ==
While a student Turner played rugby football for St George's Hospital, appearing regularly in inter-hospital matches in London. He also represented the United Hospitals, a representative side drawn from the London teaching hospitals.

In 1876 he was selected for the England side that played the Scotland at The Oval on 6 March 1876. Playing as a forward, he won a single international cap as England defeated Scotland by a goal and a try.

== Medical and military career ==
Turner qualified in medicine in 1877 and was appointed house surgeon at St George's Hospital in 1878. He subsequently served as surgical registrar and anaesthetist before being appointed surgeon to the Dreadnought Seamen's Hospital at Greenwich in 1881.

In 1887 he was elected assistant surgeon at St George's Hospital and later became a full surgeon and consulting surgeon there. Turner lectured in anatomy and surgery and served as an examiner in anatomy. He also contributed articles to surgical reference works including Heath's Dictionary of Surgery and Latham and English's System of Treatment.

During the First World War he served as a consultant to the Admiralty and held the temporary rank of Surgeon Rear-Admiral, working at naval hospitals including those at Chatham and Plymouth. For his services he was appointed Companion of the Order of the Bath in 1917 and Knight Commander of the Order of the British Empire in 1919.

== Personal life ==
On 31 August 1882 Turner married Isabel Beatrice Du Croz at West Hoathly in Sussex. Her father, Frederick Augustus Du Croz, was a merchant.

They had five children:

- Edith Isabel Margaret Turner (1883–1960), who married Sydney Spencer Sawyer-Cookson, Judicial Commissioner of British North Borneo.
- Catherine Mary Turner (born 1884), later appointed Member of the Order of the British Empire.
- George Frederick Turner (23 March 1886 – ), a lieutenant in the 5th Dragoon Guards who served in France during the First World War.
- Dorothy Hannah Turner (born 1889), who married George Arthur Ewart in 1914.
- Edward Percy Turner (7 July 1890 – 1917), a captain in the Royal Field Artillery who was killed in action during the First World War.

By 1911, Turner was living in Radlett, Hertfordshire, with his wife and daughters Catherine and Dorothy.

He died at his home at Flat 10, 37 Adelaide Terrace, Hove, on 7 April 1941.
