= Hugh Monteith (rugby union) =

Scotland international rugby union player

Hugh Montieth
- Born: Hugh Glencairn Montieth; 11 May 1883 Moniaive, Scotland
- Died: 10 October 1963 (aged 80) Truro, England
- School: Fettes College

Rugby union career
- Position: Forward
Amateur team(s)
Years	Team	Apps	(Points)
- Cambridge University
- London Scottish
- Army Rugby Union
- Royal London Hospital
Provincial / State sides
Years	Team	Apps	(Points)
1903	Anglo-Scots		
1906-07	Provinces District		
International career
Years	Team	Apps	(Points)
1905-08	Scotland	8	(3)

Hugh Montieth (11 May 1883 – 10 October 1963) was a Scotland international rugby union player.

== Rugby Union career ==
=== Amateur career ===
He went to Fettes College and played rugby union for the school side.

He played for Cambridge University.

He then played for London Scottish.

He played for the Army Rugby Union.

He also played for the Royal London Hospital rugby union club.

=== Provincial career ===
He played for the Anglo-Scots against South of Scotland District on 26 December 1903.

He represented Provinces District in 1906 and 1907.

=== International career ===
He played 8 times for Scotland, scoring 1 try.

== Military career ==
He joined the RAMC and became a captain. He was attached to the 2nd battalion of the Duke of Cornwall's Light Infantry.

He was awarded the D.S.O in 1915:

For conspicuous gallantry and devotion to duty in picking up and attending to the wounded updet heavy fire in the actions near St. Jean and Wieltje, east of Ypres, between 23rd and 27th April. when the casualties in the battalion to which he was attached were very heavy.

He then was in the Indian Army later in the First World War.

== Family ==
His parents were Rev. John Monteith and Ellen Maria Neve (1845-1912). They had 3 sons including Hugh.

Hugh married Dorothy Huntly Dunell in October 1915 in Garboldisham, near Thetford in Norfolk, England. Dorothy was the eldest daughter of Owen Robert Dunell (1856-1929) and Marion Isabel Huntly (1864-1937) of Garboldisham Manor.

They had 2 children Cynthia Monteith (1916-1989) and Ronald Hugh Monteith (1918-1945).
