= Morgan Crowe =

Irish rugby union player

- Born: Morgan Patrick Crowe; 5 March 1907 Dublin
- Died: 8 April 1993 (aged 86) Ballsbridge
- University: Royal College of Surgeons in Ireland

Rugby union career
- Position: Centre
Senior career
Years	Team	Apps	(Points)
1932–35	Leicester Tigers	72	(160)
????	Richmond Hospital; Lansdowne		
International career
Years	Team	Apps	(Points)
1929–34	Ireland	13	(6)

Morgan Patrick Crowe (5 March 1907 – 8 April 1993) was a rugby union centre who played thirteen times for Ireland between 1929–34. He played his club rugby for Leicester Tigers and Lansdowne.

Crowe made his international debut for Ireland on 9 March 1929 against Wales in a 5–5 draw at Ravenhill. He played for Richmond Hospital in the Dublin Hospitals Rugby Cup. In the 1930 final against Sir Patrick Dun's Hospital he fractured his clavicle, ruling him out of the 1930 Lions tour of New Zealand, for which he had been selected.

A doctor by profession his work took him to the Leicester Royal Infirmary. Crowe made his Leicester Tigers debut on 1 October 1932 against Coventry at Welford Road. Crowe played 25 times in his first season at the club and earned a re-call to the Ireland international side for the 1933 Home Nations Championship playing against Wales and Scotland. Crowe became Leicester's regular goal kicker in the 1933/34 season and was the club's top scorer with 87 points across 30 games. His final game for Leicester was on 23 April 1935 against Exeter.

Crowe also briefly played football for UCD in the Leinster Senior League.
