= Bill Tucker (rugby union) =

England international rugby union player & surgeon (1903–1991)

- Born: William Eldon Tucker; 6 August 1903 Hamilton, Bermuda
- Died: 4 August 1991 (aged 87) Bermuda
- School: Sherborne School
- University: Caius College, Cambridge
- Notable relative(s): William Eldon Tucker, father

Rugby union career
- Position: No. 8
Amateur team(s)
Years	Team	Apps	(Points)
- Cambridge University R.U.F.C.
–	St. George's Hospital		
–	Blackheath F.C.		
–	Barbarian F.C.		
–	Kent		
International career
Years	Team	Apps	(Points)
1926–1930	England	3	(0)

William Eldon Tucker CVO MBE TD (6 August 1903 – 4 August 1991) was a Bermudian orthopaedic surgeon and rugby union player who played club rugby for Cambridge University, St. George's Hospital and Blackheath. Tucker gained his first of three international caps when he was selected for England in 1926. As a surgeon, Tucker specialised in sports injuries. He also had a long career in the Territorial Army section of the Royal Army Medical Corps, and was decorated for his Second World War service, much of which was spent in German POW camps having remained with the wounded in France during the Dunkirk evacuation.

== Personal history ==
William Eldon Tucker was born in Hamilton, Bermuda, in 1903 to William Eldon Tucker and Henrietta Hutchings. His father was a medical doctor, and Tucker's life would follow his father's closely in professional and sporting areas. Tucker was educated at Sherborne School in England, before matriculating to Caius College, Cambridge. After leaving Cambridge he continued his education at St George's Hospital, London; where he gained his MRCS and LRCP in 1928. On 1 November 1930 he was commissioned as a lieutenant in the Territorial Army (TA) General List of the Royal Army Medical Corps (RAMC), He transferred to the TA Reserve of Officers on 8 February 1934. In 1936, at the age of 33, he opened the Park Street Orthopaedic Clinic, where he pioneered treatment in sports' injuries, stimulated by his experiences as a rugby player.

With the outbreak of the Second World War imminent, Tucker returned to the RAMC TA General List, and was promoted to captain on 12 April 1939. He was called up for active service when the TA was mobilised. He was captured by German forces early in the conflict, when he chose to remain behind to treat injured soldiers, during the Dunkirk evacuation. As a prisoner of war he made himself useful by constructing improvised artificial limbs for injured soldiers. After his repatriation from Germany, he was appointed Member of the Order of the British Empire on 3 February 1944, "in recognition of gallant and distinguished services during and prior to captivity." After the war, while retaining his TA commission, he returned to work at his London Clinic, and through focusing on injuries to sportsmen and women, it became a very successful business. Tucker elected to keep his clinic open seven days a week, therefore becoming a first port of call for sportspeople injured during weekend sporting events, this was very popular with jockeys who required to return to racing as soon as possible for economic reasons. Tucker's clients were notable and included famous cricketers, footballers and members of the British Royal family.

Tucker's TA career continued in parallel, he was promoted major on 15 August 1947, and concurrently granted the acting rank of lieutenant-colonel. In 1950, the rank of lt-col was confirmed, backdated to his original acting promotion. On 16 February 1951 he was awarded the Territorial Efficiency Decoration, with clasp for his long-service in the TA, and was promoted acting colonel on 1 June 1951, substantive promotion followed early the next year, again backdated to the original assumption of acting rank. He was appointed Commander of the Royal Victorian Order in the 1954 New Year Honours. He transferred back to the TA Reserve of Officers on 1 July 1956.

In 1956, Tucker, along with Arthur Porritt and Sir Adolphe Abrahams gathered a group interested in sport and medicine, which became the British Association of Sport and Medicine. On 24 July 1960 he was appointed Honorary Colonel of 17 (London) General Hospital, RAMC, TA, holding the position until 1 December 1963. During this period he reached the age limit for service, and so retired from the TA Reserve of Officers on 6 August 1961.

Tucker wrote several books on health and fitness, including Young at Heart, an advice book for remaining fit in old age. On his retirement he left Britain and returned to his family home in Bermuda. He was married twice, and had two children from his first marriage. His second wife, journalist Mary Castle, co-authored of several of his books and was formerly married to Cedric Belfrage.

== Rugby career ==
Tucker first came to note as a rugby player when he played for Cambridge University. He played in four Varsity Matches from 1922 to 1925, and he was given the captaincy in the 1925 match. Tucker was described as a 'fine forward' and a 'sanguine, forceful and cheerful personality. During the 1925/26 season, Tucker was given his first international cap, when he was selected for England during the 1926 Five Nations Championship. The match, played against Ireland at Lansdowne Road, ended in a 19–15 victory for the Irish team. After leaving Cambridge, Tucker played for St George's Hospital and then Blackheath, as well as being selected to play county rugby for Kent. Tucker needed to wait until 1930 to play for England again, and played two games in the 1930 Championship, a win over Wales and another loss to Ireland.

Tucker's rugby career is closely linked to that of his father. Not only did the two men share the same name, William Eldon Tucker, but both were educated at Caius College in Cambridge, before completing a medical education at St George's Hospital. At Cambridge, both men played for the University rugby club, and were also honoured by captaining the team during a Varsity Match. Both men played for St George's RFC, Blackheath and played county rugby for Kent. A more difficult feat was achieved when both were chosen to represent England at international level and being chosen to play for invitational touring side, the Barbarians.

== Bibliography ==
- Godwin, Terry (1984). The International Rugby Championship 1883–1983. Grafton Street, London: Willow Books. ISBN 0-00-218060-X.
- Griffiths, John (1982). The Book of English International Rugby 1872–1982. London: Willow Books. ISBN 0002180065.
- Marshall, Howard; Jordon, J.P. (1951). Oxford v Cambridge, The Story of the University Rugby Match. London: Clerke & Cockeran.
