= James Mackinlay =

England international rugby union player

- Born: James Egan Harrison Mackinlay; 17 December 1850 Guildford, Surrey
- Died: 1 July 1917 (aged 66) (registered in) Guisborough
- University: University of Oxford; University of London (St. George's Hospital Medical School)

Rugby union career
- Position: Forward
Amateur team(s)
Years	Team	Apps	(Points)
-	St. George's Hospital		
International career
Years	Team	Apps	(Points)
1872-1875	England	3	

James Mackinlay (1850–1917) was a rugby union international who represented England from 1872 to 1875.

== Early life ==
James Mackinlay was born on 17 December 1850 in Guildford. He attended Oxford University and went on to study medicine at St. George's Hospital Medical School.

== Rugby union career ==
Mackinlay made his international debut on 5 February 1872 at The Oval in the England vs Scotland match. Of the three matches he played for his national side he was on the winning side on two occasions. He played his final match for England on 15 February 1875 at The Oval in the England vs Ireland match.
