= Jim Murphy-O'Connor =

Irish rugby union player

- Full name: James Colman Murphy-O'Connor
- Born: 6 June 1925 Reading, England
- Died: 10 August 2014 (aged 89) Buckinghamshire, England
- School: Prior Park College
- Notable relative(s): Cormac Murphy-O'Connor (brother); Jerome Murphy-O'Connor (cousin); William O'Neill (brother-in-law)
- Occupation: Doctor

Rugby union career
- Position: No. 8
International career
Years	Team	Apps	(Points)
1954	Ireland	1	(3)

James Colman Murphy-O'Connor (6 June 1925 – 10 August 2014) was an Irish international rugby union player.

== Biography ==
The son of a doctor, Murphy-O'Connor was born in Reading, the eldest of six siblings. He attended Prior Park College with his four brothers. His youngest brother was the British cardinal Cormac Murphy-O'Connor and he was also a cousin of priest and biblical scholar Jerome Murphy-O'Connor.

Murphy-O'Connor studied medicine at St Mary's Hospital in Paddington, where he was involved in Hospitals Cup rugby, and undertook further studies at the Royal College of Surgeons, Dublin. He practised medicine in Slough.

A 6 ft 6 in forward, Murphy-O'Connor captained Bective Rangers to the Leinster Senior Cup title in 1948. He was a Leinster representative player and was capped once for Ireland, against England at Twickenham in the 1954 Five Nations, with his penalty goal accounting for his team's only points in a 3–14 loss. His biggest contribution to rugby came through pioneering the kicking technique of striking the ball using his instep, instead of the toe.

Murphy-O'Connor married the sister of Ireland prop William O'Neill.

== See also ==
- List of Ireland national rugby union players
