= Melbourne Thomas =

Wales international rugby union footballer

- Born: Beriah Melbourne Gwynne Thomas; 11 June 1896 Nantymoel, Bridgend County Borough, Wales
- Died: 23 June 1966 (aged 70) Pontypridd, Wales
- School: Bridgend County School
- University: University College, Cardiff

Rugby union career
- Position: wing
Amateur team(s)
| Years | Team | Apps | (Points) |
- Nantymoel RFC
| – | Ogmore Vale RFC | | |
| – | St. Batholomew's Hospital | | |
| – | Bridgend RFC | | |
| – | London Welsh RFC | | |
| – | Cardiff RFC | | |
| – | Barbarian F.C. | | |
International career
| Years | Team | Apps | (Points) |
| 1919–1924 | Wales | 6 | (6) |

Beriah Melbourne Gwynne Thomas (11 June 1896 – 23 June 1966) was a Welsh international rugby union player. He played club rugby several teams including Nantymoel, Ogmore Vale, Bridgend, St. Batholomew's Hospital, London Welsh and Cardiff. At international level he represented Wales on six occasions.

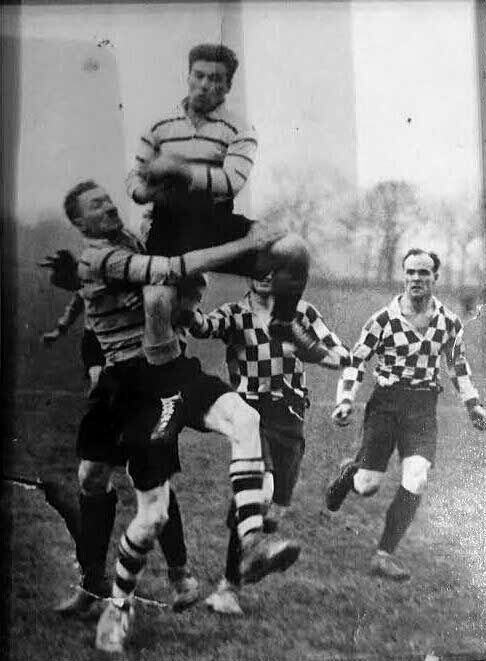
Jumping for the ball

== Rugby career ==
"Melbourne" Thomas was a Doctor of Medicine, having studied first at University College, Cardiff and then at St Bartholomew's Hospital, he also played rugby for both institutions. During the First World War he enlisted in the Royal Navy, serving as a surgeon sub-lieutenant. After the war came to a close, in an effort to rebuild the sport of rugby, a match was organised between a Wales team and the New Zealand Army. The game was arranged for 21 April 1919, to be played at St. Helen's in Swansea. Thomas was chosen to represent Wales, earning his first international cap.

== International games played ==
Wales

- England 1924
- Ireland 1921
- France 1921, 1923
- New Zealand Army 1919
- Scotland 1921

== Bibliography ==
- Billot, John (1972). All Blacks. Ferndale: Ron Jones Publications.
- Smith, David; Williams, Gareth (1980). Fields of Praise: The Official History of The Welsh Rugby Union. Cardiff: University of Wales Press. ISBN 0-7083-0766-3.
