= William Berkley (rugby union) =

Scotland international rugby union player

- Born: William Vaughan Berkley; 14 June 1904 Cowfold, England
- Died: 19 May 1973 (aged 68) Shillingstone, England
- School: Fettes College

Rugby union career
- Position: Prop
Amateur team(s)
Years	Team	Apps	(Points)
1924-26	Oxford University		
1926-29	London Scottish		
International career
Years	Team	Apps	(Points)
1926-29	Scotland	4	(0)

William Berkley (14 June 1904 – 19 May 1973) was a Scotland international rugby union player.

== Rugby union career ==
=== Amateur career ===
Berkley played for Oxford University. He was given an 'Oxford Blue' for playing Cambridge University from 1924 to 1926.

After playing for Oxford he then moved to play for London Scottish.

His London Scottish and international career was curtailed by Berkley moving to the East, he returned on furlough to play in the 1929 Five Nations Championship and the Exiles side again.

=== International career ===
The Scotsman newspaper of 21 December 1925 noted this on Berkley's call up to the Scotland squad:

As W . V . Berkley was not even called upon for the trial on Saturday, his inclusion came as a complete surprise. It was not generally known that he had a Scottish qualification. His qualification, however, is quite a sound one, and is on the maternal side. His father is a clergyman in England, and both father and son are Old Fettesians. He showed excellent form in the three matches which Oxford University have played in Scotland recently and proved the best of the Oxonian forwards.

He was capped 4 times by Scotland in the period 1926–29. He played in both the 1926 Five Nations Championship and the 1929 Five Nations Championship, both of which Scotland won.

His later selection in the 1928–29 season also caused a surprise. The Dundee Evening Telegraph of 9 January 1929 reporting:

Shortly after the team was published. I heard many comments on the matter, and these could summed up in three questions:— "Who this W. V. Berkley?"; "What club does Berkley belong to?"; and "Where has Berkley been?" No doubt these questions are reflected in the minds of the majority of Scottish Rugby enthusiasts, and the people cannot be blamed for their curiosity. Berkley played against France in 1926 but was immediately dropped, and even the wisest and most experienced of critics had no idea of forecasting him for a place in this year's team. He was an outstanding member of the Oxford University pack in seasons 1924-25-26; is now home from abroad, and on the last Saturday of December played for London Scottish. He has been chosen without playing in a single trial match, an experience which also befell him in 1926.

== Teaching career ==
He became a headmaster in 1952 at The Downs Malvern, Colwall in Herefordshire, and stayed there till 1969.

== Family ==
His father was the Reverend. Maurice Berkley (1872-1947), and his mother Grace McDonnell (1876-1957). They had 2 sons, including William, and 2 daughters.

William Berkley married Edith Greenstock (1908-1991) in India in 1936.

== Death ==
He died at the age of 68 years old, not long after his retirement as a teacher. He is buried in Shillingstone Churchyard in Dorset.
