= Jonathan Osborne =

Irish physician (??–1864)

- Died: 22 January 1864
- Occupations: physician surgeon.

Jonathan Osborne MD FRCPI (died 22 Jan 1864) was an Irish medical doctor and surgeon.

== Life ==
Osborne was the son of William Osborne of Cullenswood House, near Ranelagh, Dublin,. He entered Trinity College, Dublin, in 1810 and graduated BA in 1815 and MD in 1818. He started practice in Dublin.

In 1823 he was elected Fellow of the College of Physicians and in 1825 lecturer of Materia Medica in Park St. Medical School. Shortly afterwards he was appointed physician to Sir Patrick Dun's Hospital and Mercer's Hospital. In Dublin he is remembered for the instruments he devised and for his studies on nervous diseases.

He was at least an amateur botanist contributing records to Katherine Baily's The Irish flora (1833) and James Townsend Mackay's Flora hibernica (1836). These indicate that he visited counties Clare and Galway including the Aran Islands, as well as Mayo before 1833.

With his wife Catherine, he had a son, Verney, and daughter Florence (who married Rev. William H. Rambaut), both of whom died as young adults and are interred with him in St. Michan's Church, Dublin.

== References and sources ==
Notes

Sources

- Kirkpatrick, T P (1912). History of Medical Teaching in Trinity College Dublin and of the School of Physic In Ireland. Dublin: Neal.
- Fleetwood, John F (1983). The History of Medicine in Ireland. Dublin: Skellig Press.
