= London Scottish F.C. =

English rugby union football club

(England) London Scottish
- Full name: London Scottish Football Club
- Union: Middlesex RFU, Scottish RU
- Nickname(s): The Exiles, Scottish
- Founded: 1878; 148 years ago
- Location: Richmond, London, England
- Ground: Richmond Athletic Ground (Capacity: 4,500 (1,000 seated))
- President: Paul Burnell
- Director of Rugby: Bryan Redpath
- Coach: Joe Gray
- Captain: Joe Rees
- League: National League 1
- 2025–26: 13th (relegated to National League 1)
1st kit	2nd kit

Official website
- londonscottish.com

London Scottish Football Club is a rugby union club in England. The club is a member of both the Rugby Football Union and the Scottish Rugby Union. The club is currently playing in the third tier of the English rugby union system, National League 1 following their relegation from Champ Rugby in season 2025–26. London Scottish share the Athletic Ground with Richmond.

== History ==
=== Founding ===
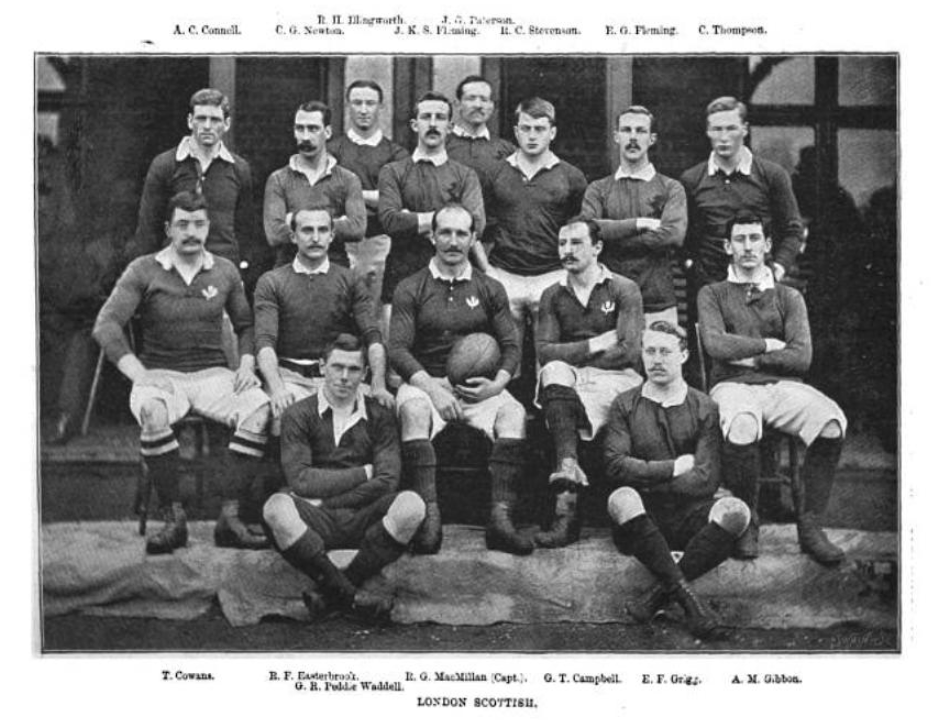
London Scottish team of 1895

In early 1878, three Scottish members of a team called St. Andrew's Rovers FC decided to break away to form their own club for Scots. These men, George Grant, Neil Macglashan and Robert Arnot attracted a number of responses to a circular they sent out. The London Scottish Regiment in particular were very warm to the idea. Very soon after, on 10 April 1878, London Scottish FC was founded in The Queen's Head, in Water Lane, Blackfriars, London (universally known as MacKay's Tavern, frequently mis-recorded, as Ned Mackay the jovial Scottish landlord ran the pub), initially played on Blackheath Common, and later at Richmond Athletic Ground in Surrey.

They had a sizable fixture list and played some of the leading clubs of the time immediately, such as Ravenscourt Park Football Club and Queen's House Football Club (the latter being the only London team to have never lost to London Scottish). They also played St Andrew's Rovers that season. St Andrew's, who had lost the core of their best players, lost twice to London Scottish and folded at the end of the season. London Scottish had a very successful first season, and having played 15 matches they only lost four (against already well established sides, Flamingoes, Guy's Hospital, Queen's House and Wasps).

In 1914 at the outbreak of the First World War all sixty members of the four London Scottish teams who played in their last matches in April enlisted. Fifteen survived. Only one played Rugby again. They are commemorated in Mick Imlah's poem "London Scottish".

=== Early history ===
London Scottish was the first of the "Exiles" rugby clubs to be founded, and the last of the main three – after London Irish and London Welsh – to go "open" in 1996.

London Scottish made the John Player Cup Final in 1974, where they lost 26–6 against defending champions Coventry.

The club regularly featured at the Middlesex Sevens tournament, winning the trophy in 1937, 1960, 1961, 1962, 1963, 1965 and 1991. They have won the Melrose Sevens three times, in 1962, 1965 and 2019.

=== Professional era (1996–2020) ===
Scottish turned professional in 1996. Tony Tiarks bought the club for £500,000 in 1996.

In the summer of 1998 Scottish, co-tenants of Richmond at the Athletic Ground, were promoted to the top division via a play-off, and Tiarks forced through an ill-fated groundshare with Harlequins and London Broncos at the Stoop Memorial Ground.

In the 1998–99 season, Scottish made their only appearance in the English Premiership. Under coach John Steele, and despite limited resources, the team finished 12th out of 14 teams, which would have saved them from relegation had they not fallen into administration at the season's end. Notable wins that season included: versus Bath (13–11), Saracens (24–7) and Newcastle Falcons (27–17). That season's squad included Scottish international stars Ronnie Eriksson, Simon Holmes and Derrick Lee, Australians Seán Childs, Simon Fenn and Eddie Jones, and the South African Jannie de Beer.

Midway through the 1998–1999 season, Tiarks became disillusioned and discussed selling Scottish's place in the Premiership to second-division Bristol. He bailed out in the summer of 1999. The professional club London Scottish Rugby was placed into administration in 1999 and nominally merged into London Irish (who moved their games to the Stoop) along with Richmond, who were also placed into administration.

The original amateur club rejoined the RFU leagues at the bottom of the pyramid after effectively having been relegated nine divisions by the RFU. The club progressed back up through seven divisions in 10 seasons to RFU Championship for the 2011–12 season.

The club was promoted to the English National leagues (National Division Three South) for the 2007–08 season after an eight-year absence. The club was unbeaten in the 2008–09 season, earning promotion to the revamped RFU National 1 Division for the 2009–10 season. In 2009–10, the club finished second in their first season in RFU National 1 Division.

The club secured promotion to the RFU Championship for the 2011–12 season. During the 2012–13 season, the club made the switch to a full-time professional set-up, with many of the club's part-time professional players leaving and new coaches brought on board, this included former Leicester Tigers hooker James Buckland and France and London Wasps legend Serge Betsen. The fully professional set-up was credited for an impressive performance away to Championship leaders Newcastle Falcons, where three penalties brought them to the brink of a shock win, but they lost 12–9. There followed significant wins in the second half of the season, including a 26–23 victory over Bedford Blues, a 25–13 win over Nottingham and a 20–17 win away at Cornish Pirates. Scottish were still challenging for a place in the top four of the Championship until as late as March, when they were beaten by Leeds Carnegie, and they ended the season in mid-table.

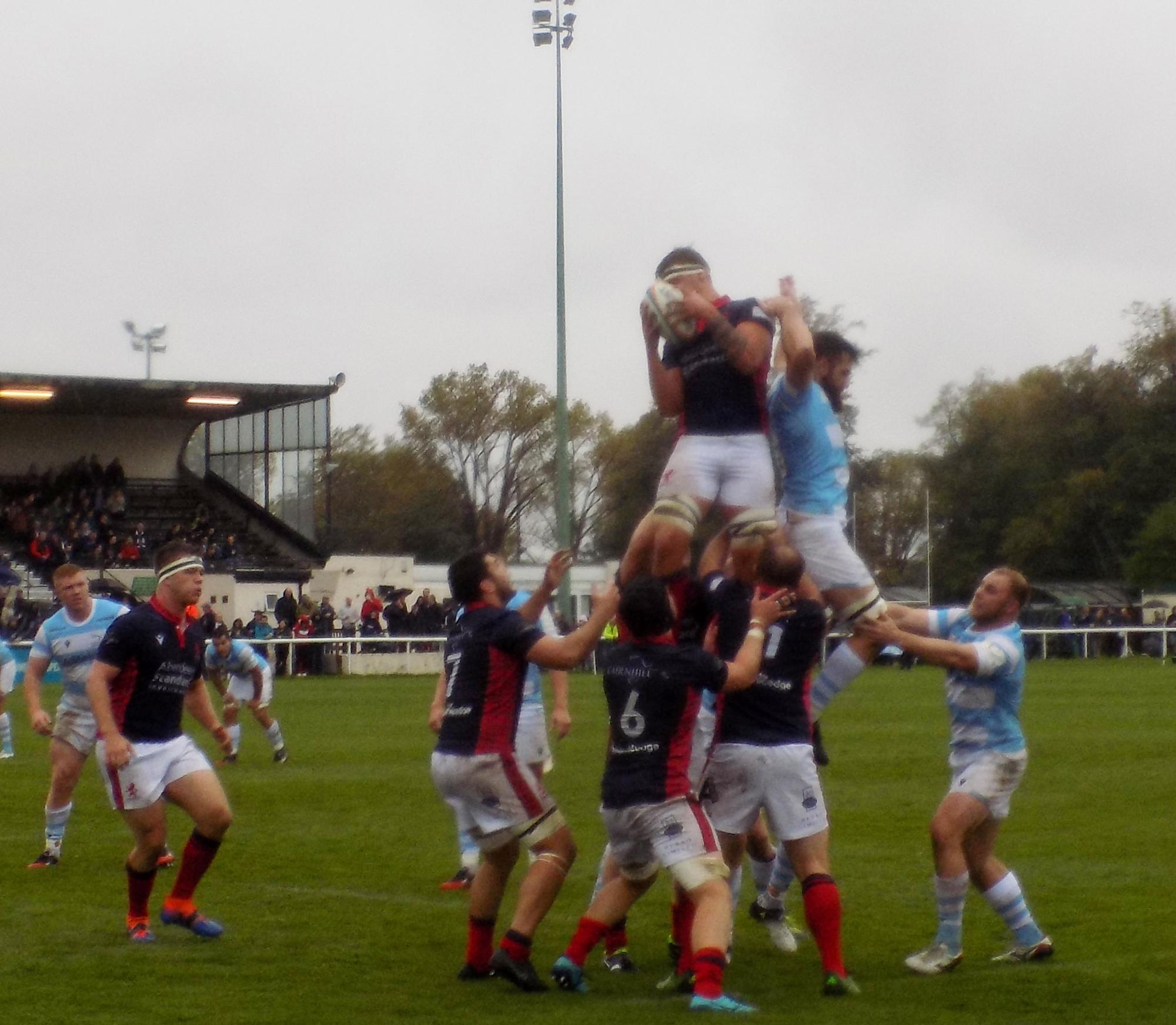
A match in 2019

The Scottish again finished mid-table in the Championship in the 2013–14 season. The team had four players named in the Championship Best XV – American international Eric Fry, Tomas Francis, Mark Bright and Championship top try-scorer Miles Mantella.

Following a mediocre 2016–17 campaign, the club appointed Loughborough Students director of rugby Dave Morris as director of rugby and the club saw a change at the top, with Malcom Offord becoming chairman of the club and Carson Russell as CEO.

=== Semi-professional club (2021–) ===
Following a reduction in funding from the RFU, Scottish adopted a semi-professional model from the 2020–21 season, with players and coaches being employed part-time. Following this, in February 2021 it was confirmed that due to funding cuts and the costs associated with the COVID-19 pandemic Scottish would not take part in the upcoming season.

Scottish were to leave the Athletic Ground after 127 years, with the first team temporarily relocating to Esher's rugby ground in Hersham and the rest of the club also seeking relocation. However it was later confirmed they would remain at the Athletic Ground for their return to the Championship in the 2021–22 season.

=== Sevens ===
London Scottish have been great exponents of rugby sevens, winning the Melrose Sevens three times, Middlesex Sevens seven times and the Rosslyn Park London Floodlit Sevens seven times.

== Captains and league position (since 1999–2000) ==
Season	Division	Captain	Position
1999–00	Non League (London Senior Clubs)	Ewan Kearney	Winners of Merit table
2000–01	Herts/Middlesex 1	Damian Lilley	Runner-up
2001–02	London 4 NW	Steven Wichary	Champions
2002–03	London 3 NW	Magnus Macdonald	Champions
2003–04	London 2 North	David Watt	Champions
2004–05	London 1	Karl Hensley	4th
2005–06	London 1	Karl Hensley	3rd
2006–07	London 1	Alex Alesbrook	Champions
2007–08	National Division Three South	Alex Alesbrook	4th National
2008–09	National Division Three South	Gary Trueman	Champions
2009–10	National League One	Gary Trueman	2nd
2010–11	National League One	Ian McInroy	Champions
2011–12	The Championship	Lewis Calder	9th
2012–13	The Championship	Mark Bright	8th
2013–14	The Championship	Mark Bright	5th
2014–15	The Championship	Mark Bright	3rd
2015–16	The Championship	Mark Bright	8th
2016–17	The Championship	Rory Bartle	7th
2017–18	The Championship	Lewis Wynne	11th
2018–19	The Championship	Mark Bright	9th
2019–20	The Championship	Chris Dean	11th
2020–21	Did not compete due to COVID-19 pandemic	-	-
2021–22	The Championship	Brian Tuilagi	11th
2022–23	The Championship	Joe Rees	11th
2023–24	The Championship		-

== Head coach and management (since 1999–2000) ==
Season	Division	Head coach	Manager
1999–00	Non League	Iain Morrison	Colin McIntyre
2000–01	Herts/Middlesex 1	Brett Cookson	Colin McIntyre
2001–02	London 4 NW	Kevin Powderly	Colin Mcintyre
2002–03	London 3 NW	Kevin Powderly	Colin McIntyre
2003–04	London 2 North	Rick Scott	Colin McIntyre
2004–05	London 1	Rowly Williams	Colin McIntyre
2005–06	London 1	Rowly Williams	Colin McIntyre
2006–07	London 1	Terry O'Connor	Colin McIntyre
2007–08	National Division Three South	Terry O'Connor	Colin McIntyre
2008–09	National Division Three South	Brett Taylor	Colin McIntyre
2009–10	National League One	Brett Taylor	Colin McIntyre
2010–11	National League One	Simon Amor	Colin McIntyre
2011–12	The Championship	Simon Amor	Ross Macgregor
2012–13	The Championship	Simon Amor	Ross Macgregor
2013–14	The Championship	Simon Amor	Laurence Bruggemann

== Overall league statistics ==
Season	Division	Played	Won	Draw	Lost	Points For	Points Against	Points Diff	Points	Pos
1987–88	National League 2	11	4	1	6	141	158	–17	9	7th
1988–89	National League 2	11	3	1	7	146	160	–16	7	11th
1989–90	National League 3	11	11	0	0	258	92	166	22	1st
1990–91	National League 2	12	7	0	5	240	178	62	14	5th
1991–92	National League 2	12	11	0	1	304	130	174	22	1st
1992–93	Premiership	12	3	1	8	192	248	–56	7	10th
1993–94	National League 2	18	6	0	12	232	325	–93	12	8th
1999–00	Non-league	26	19	1	6	775	341	434		1st
2000–01	Herts/Middlesex 1	18	17	0	1	554	118	436	34	2nd
2001–02	London 4 NW	18	14	0	4	533	214	319	28	1st
2002–03	London 3 NW	18	16	0	2	560	199	361	32	1st
2003–04	London 2 North	22	20	1	1	752	277	475	41	1st
2004–05	London 1	22	15	0	7	676	343	333	30	4th
2005–06	London 1	22	16	1	5	840	324	516	33	3rd
2006–07	London 1	22	20	0	2	997	235	762	40	1st
2007–08	National Division Three South	26	17	0	9	633	410	223	83	4th
2008–09	National Division Three South	26	25	1	0	1092	328	764	120	1st
2009–10	National League One	30	22	1	7	938	569	369	108	2nd
2010–11	National League One	30	27	0	3	958	516	442	132	1st
2011–12	The Championship	22	6	0	16	422	543	−121	34	9th
2012–13	The Championship	22	10	0	12	456	610	−154	45	8th

== Honours ==
London Scottish

- Melrose Sevens champions: 1962, 1965, 2019
- Hawick Sevens champions: 1965
- Kelso Sevens champions: 1991
- Ross Sutherland Sevens champions: 1990
- Glasgow Academicals Sevens champions: 1979, 1989
- Haig Trophy Sevens champions: 1980
- Stirling Sevens champions: 1988
- Middlesex Sevens champions: 1937, 1960, 1961, 1962, 1963, 1965, 1991
- Courage League Division 3 champions: 1989–90
- Courage League National Division 2 champions: 1991–92
- London Division 4 North West champions: 2001–02
- London Division 3 North West champions: 2002–03
- London Division 2 North champions: 2003–04
- London Division 1 champions: 2006–07
- National League 3 South champions: 2008–09
- National League 1 champions: 2010–11

London Scottish Lions (amateur side)

- Herts/Middlesex 2 champions: 2018–19

== Current standings ==
2026–27 National League 1 table
Pos	Team	Pld	W	D	L	PF	PA	PD	TB	LB	Pts	Qualification
1	Plymouth Albion	10	10	0	0	537	168	+369	10	0	50	Promotion place
2	Tonbridge Juddians	10	8	0	2	394	347	+47	10	1	43	Promotion play-off
3	Camborne	10	8	0	2	409	307	+102	9	1	42	Promotion play-off
4	Leeds Tykes	10	7	0	3	369	277	+92	8	3	39	
5	Sale FC	10	7	0	3	427	286	+141	8	2	38	
6	Rosslyn Park	10	6	0	4	374	313	+61	9	1	34	
7	London Scottish	10	5	0	5	373	375	−2	8	2	30	
8	Bishop's Stortford	10	4	0	6	369	395	−26	9	2	27	
9	Birmingham Moseley	10	4	0	6	266	378	−112	6	1	23	
10	Rams	10	3	1	6	264	335	−71	7	2	23	
11	Dings Crusaders	10	2	1	7	362	436	−74	9	3	22	Relegation play-off
12	Bury St Edmunds	10	3	0	7	275	399	−124	7	1	20	Relegation place
13	Sheffield	10	2	0	8	261	381	−120	7	3	18	Relegation place
14	Cambridge	10	0	0	10	262	545	−283	6	3	9	Relegation place

Updated to match(es) played on 7 November 2026. Source: National League Rugby
Rules for classification: If teams are level at any stage, tiebreakers are applied in the following order:
1. Number of matches won
2. Number of matches drawn
3. Difference between points for and against
4. Total number of points for
5. Aggregate number of points scored in matches between tied teams
6. Number of matches won excluding the first match, then the second and so on until the tie is settled

== Current squad ==
The London Scottish squad as announced for the 2025–26 season is:

London Scottish 2025–26 Champ Rugby squad
**Props**: (South Africa) Vaughan Bentley; (England) Osman Dimen; (England) Austin Hay; (England) Tam Lindsay; (South Africa) Ntinga Mpiko; (England) Will Prior; **Hookers**: (England) Harry Clayton; (England) Jimmy Staples; (England) Jack Wright; **Locks**: (England) Harry Browne (Note: Harlequins players who are dual-registered with the club for the 2025-26 season.); (Netherlands) **Marijn Huis**; (England) Declan Johnson; (England) Theo Vukasinovic; (England) Alex Wardell; (England) Matt Wilkinson	**Back row**: (England) Lewis Barrett; (England) Seb Driscoll (Note: Harlequins players who are dual-registered with the club for the 2025-26 season.); (England) Jonny Green (Note: Harlequins players who are dual-registered with the club for the 2025-26 season.); (England) Jack Ingall; (England) Tom Marshall; (England) Bailey Ransom; (England) Jack Spurway; (England) Elliot Williams (Note: Harlequins players who are dual-registered with the club for the 2025-26 season.); **Scrum-halves**: (Ireland) Stephen Kerins; (England) Jonny Law; (Scotland) Dan Nutton; **Fly-halves**: (England) Josh Bellamy (Note: Harlequins players who are dual-registered with the club for the 2025-26 season.); (England) Fraser Honey; (England) Alec Lloyd-Seed; (England) Harry Sheppard; (England) Tom Wilstead	**Centres**: (Ireland) Hayden Hyde (Note: Harlequins players who are dual-registered with the club for the 2025-26 season.); (England) Luko Kolade (Note: Harlequins players who are dual-registered with the club for the 2025-26 season.); (Scotland) Robbie McCallum; (England) Frankie McMillian (Note: Harlequins players who are dual-registered with the club for the 2025-26 season.); (Fiji) Solodrau Radianirova; (England) Will Simonds; **Wings**: (England) Murray Bellis; (England) Noah Ferdinand; (England) Matt Gribbon; **Fullbacks**: (New Zealand) Jack Leslie; (Wales) Will Talbot-Davies
**(c)** denotes the team captain. (vc) denotes vice-captain. **Bold** denotes internationally capped players.^{ST} denotes a short-term signing.

== Notable former players ==
=== Scotland internationalists ===
The following former London Scottish players have represented Scotland at full international level. London Scottish have produced more than 220 Scottish international players, more than any other club.

- (Scotland) (South Africa) John Allan
- (Scotland) John Anderson
- (Scotland) David Bedell-Sivright
- (Scotland) John Bell
- (Scotland) William Berkley
- (Scotland) Alastair Biggar
- (Scotland) Mike Biggar
- (Scotland) Norman Bruce
- Paul Burnell, their most-capped player, who played 52 matches for Scotland (3 World Cups – 1991, 1995, 1999)
- (Scotland) George Campbell
- (Scotland) Mike Campbell-Lamerton
- (Scotland) Damian Cronin (2 World Cups – 1991, 1995)
- (Scotland) John Dykes
- (Scotland) Ronnie Eriksson
- (Scotland) Max Evans (1 World Cup – 2011)
- (Scotland) Frank Fasson
- (Scotland) Pringle Fisher
- (Scotland) Charles Fleming
- (Scotland) Iain Fullarton
- (Scotland) David Gilbert-Smith
- (Scotland) (New Zealand) Colin Gilray
- (Scotland) Phil Godman
- (Scotland) Fraser Gore
- (Scotland) James Gowans
- (Scotland) Donald Grant
- (Scotland) John Hart
- (Scotland) Gavin Hastings (3 World Cups – 1987, 1991, 1995)
- (Scotland) Sandy Hinshelwood
- (Scotland) Simon Holmes
- (Scotland) William Holms
- (Scotland) John Hunter
- (Scotland) (Australia) Doug Keller
- (Scotland) Ian Kilgour
- (Scotland) Walter Kerr
- (Scotland) Iain Laughland
- (Scotland) Alan Lawson
- (Scotland) Derrick Lee
- (Scotland) Kenny Logan (3 World Cups 95, 99, 03)
- (Scotland) John MacDonald
- (Scotland) Gregor MacGregor
- (Scotland) Andrew MacKinnon
- (Scotland) Bill Maclagan 1st British Lion Captain 1891 (South Africa)
- (Scotland) David MacMyn (captain of British Lions, Argentina 1927)
- (Scotland) John Marshall
- (Scotland) Alastair McHarg – one of the many stalwarts of the club
- (Scotland) Ernie Michie
- (Scotland) Iain Morrison (1 World Cup – 1995)
- (Scotland) Hugh Monteith
- (Scotland) Alec Elliot Murray
- (Scotland) Hugh Orr
- (Scotland) Douglas Schulze
- (Scotland) Jim Shackleton
- Ian Smith – joint-record Scotland try scorer with 24 tries
- (Scotland) Arthur Smith
- (Scotland) Ken Spence
- (Scotland) Ronald Stevenson
- (Scotland) Ian Swan
- (Scotland) Malcolm Swan
- (Scotland) Frans ten Bos
- (Scotland) David Thom
- (Scotland) Bruce Thomson
- (Scotland) Rob Wainwright (1 World Cup – 1995)
- (Scotland) Leonard West
- (Scotland) Derek White (1 World Cup – 1991)
- (Scotland) Robert Whitworth
- (Scotland) Kenneth Wilson
- (Scotland) Ron Wilson

=== Wales internationalists ===
The following former London Scottish players have represented Wales at full international level.

- (Wales) Tomas Francis

=== England internationalists ===
The following former London Scottish players have represented England at full international level.

- (England) Elliot Daly

=== Ireland internationalists ===
The following former London Scottish players have represented Ireland at full international level.

- (Ireland) Kieran Treadwell

=== Other nationalities ===
- (South Africa) (Scotland) John Allan
- (Canada) Kyle Baillie
- (New Zealand) (Scotland) Colin Gilray
- (Tonga) David Halaifonua
- (The Bahamas) George Hunter
- (United States) Paul Lasike
- (United States) Will Magie
- (New Zealand) Rusty Page
- (Italy) Dave Sisi
- (Georgia (country)) Nodar Tcheishvili
- (United States) Mike Te'o
- (United States) Andrew Turner
- (Namibia) Tjiuee Uanivi
- (United States) Dino Waldren

== SRU presidents ==
Former London Scottish players have been President of the SRU:

- 1894–96 Bill Maclagan
- 1900–01 Robert MacMillan

== See also ==
- Rugby union in London
- London Irish RFC
- London Welsh RFC
- Middlesex Sevens

== Bibliography ==
- Bath, Richard (ed.) The Complete Book of Rugby (Seven Oaks Ltd, 1997 ISBN 1-86200-013-1)
- Bath, Richard (ed.) The Scotland Rugby Miscellany (Vision Sports Publishing Ltd, 2007 ISBN 1-905326-24-6)
- Godwin, Terry Complete Who's Who of International Rugby (Cassell, 1987, ISBN 0-7137-1838-2)
- Massie, Allan A Portrait of Scottish Rugby (Polygon, Edinburgh; ISBN 0-904919-84-6)
