= Bruce Thompson =

Bruce Thompson may refer to:

- Bruce Thompson (California politician) (born 1953), member of the California State Assembly
- Bruce Thompson (Georgia politician) (1965–2024), member of the Georgia State Senate
- Bruce Thompson (wrestler) (born 1951), American Olympic wrestler
- Bruce Rutherford Thompson (1911–1992), United States federal judge

== See also ==
- Bruce Thomson (disambiguation)
