= Ronnie Eriksson =

Scotland international rugby union player

- Born: Bo Ronald Sheehan Eriksson; 22 April 1972 (age 54) Athlone, Ireland
- Height: 6 ft 1 in (1.85 m)
- Weight: 15 st 6 lb (98 kg)

Rugby union career
- Position: centre
Senior career
Years	Team	Apps	(Points)
1998-1999	London Scottish		
Provincial / State sides
Years	Team	Apps	(Points)
- Scottish Exiles
International career
Years	Team	Apps	(Points)
1996-1997	Scotland	3	(3)

Ronnie Eriksson (born 22 April 1972) is a rugby union player who made three appearances for the Scotland national rugby union team. He played centre.

== Early life ==
He was born in Athlone in Ireland. He was educated at Merchiston Castle School and played rugby there.

== Rugby Union career ==
=== Amateur career ===
He played club rugby for London Scottish.

=== Provincial and professional career ===
Eriksson's career straddles the amateur and professional era. He played for Scottish Exiles and won the 1994–95 Scottish Inter-District Championship with the side.

London Scottish turned professional in 1995.

Eriksson also played for Harlequins later in his career.

=== International career ===
Eriksson made his international debut against New Zealand at Dunedin as part of the 1996 Scotland tour.

His last appearance was against England at Twickenham in 1997. He had been selected for the 1998 Scotland rugby union tour of Oceania but withdrew because of injury.
