= William Eldon Tucker =

England international rugby union player

William Tucker
- Born: William Eldon Tucker; 17 August 1872 Hamilton, Bermuda
- Died: 18 October 1953 (aged 81) Paget, Bermuda
- School: Trinity College School
- University: Caius College, Cambridge
- Notable relative(s): Bill Tucker, son

Rugby union career
- Position: Forward
Amateur team(s)
Years	Team	Apps	(Points)
- Cambridge University R.U.F.C.
–	St. George's Hospital		
–	Blackheath F.C.		
–	Barbarian F.C.		
–	Kent		
International career
Years	Team	Apps	(Points)
1894-95	England	5	(0)

William Eldon Tucker (17 August 1872 – 18 October 1953) was a Bermudian rugby union player who played club rugby for Cambridge University, St. George's Hospital and Blackheath. Tucker gained his first of five international caps when he was selected for England in 1894. He returned to Bermuda after qualifying as a medical doctor.

== Personal history ==
William Eldon Tucker was born in Hamilton, Bermuda in 1872; the fifth child of the Reverend George Tucker, and his first wife Theodosia Trott. He was mainly schooled outside Bermuda; firstly at Trinity College School in Port Hope, Ontario, before matriculating to Caius College, Cambridge in 1891. After leaving Cambridge he continued his medical studies at St George's Hospital, London; becoming a house surgeon and house physician there between 1899 and 1901. He returned to Bermuda and took a position as surgeon at King Edward VII Memorial Hospital. On 7 August 1902 he married Henrietta Frith Hutchings at Warwick Parish, Bermuda. They had four children, most notably William "Bill" Eldon Tucker, who became a noted orthopaedic surgeon specialising in sports injuries. Bill was also a rugby union international, following an almost identical rugby career to his father.

Tucker, along with Dr D.C. Trott, made a substantial impact to surgery in Bermuda, as before his arrival only two pieces of major surgery had been performed on the island; and after his arrival the number rose by hundreds. During the First World War, Tucker was notable for performing over 150 amputations to West Indies troops who arrived on Bermuda suffering with frostbite.

== Rugby career ==
Tucker first came to note as a rugby player when he joined the Cambridge University team as a student. Tucker played during the era before specialised positions in the pack, and is therefore only noted as being a forward, a role he maintained throughout hid rugby career. Tucker played in three Varsity matches against Oxford University, winning his sporting 'Blues'. The first, in 1892 was a disappointing no-score draw, attributed mainly to appalling weather that made the pitch into a muddy morass. Tucker played in the 1893 encounter, a narrow win for Oxford, and then in the 1894 match he was given the captaincy of the Cambridge team. The game ended in a one-all draw.

In 1894, while still representing Cambridge, Tucker was selected for his first international match for England, the opening game of the 1894 Home Nations Championship. Despite containing seven new caps, England defeated their opponents Wales, 24-3, and Tucker was reselected for the follow-up game against Ireland. After a narrow Ireland win, Tucker missed the final encounter of the tournament to Scotland. Tucker was back in the team for the 1895 Championship and played in all three games. After wins over Wales and Ireland, the final match and the Championship were lost in a title deciding encounter with Scotland.

Although Tucker never represented England again, he played for several notable club teams, including St George's Hospital RFC where he studied, Blackheath, and in 1894 he was chosen to play for invitational tourists, the Barbarians. Tucker had an unusually long relationship with the Barbarians, playing 17 matches between 1894 and 1899, participating in four winter tours and three summer tours. He scored a single try for the team in the 1897 encounter with Percy Park, in which the Barbarians won 20-9.

== Bibliography ==
- Godwin, Terry (1984). The International Rugby Championship 1883–1983. Grafton Street, London: Willow Books. ISBN 0-00-218060-X.
- Griffiths, John (1982). The Book of English International Rugby 1872–1982. London: Willow Books. ISBN 0002180065.
- Marshall, Howard; Jordon, J.P. (1951). Oxford v Cambridge, The Story of the University Rugby Match. London: Clerke & Cockeran.
