= Edward Beadon Turner =

England international rugby union player

- Born: Edward Beadon Turner; September 1854 Chigwell, Essex, England
- Died: 30 June 1931, (age 76) Paddington, England
- School: Uppingham School
- University: St George's Hospital
- Notable relative(s): George Robertson Turner, brother

Rugby union career
- Position: Forward
Amateur team(s)
Years	Team	Apps	(Points)
- St. George's Hospital
International career
Years	Team	Apps	(Points)
1875-1878	England	3	(0)

Edward Beadon Turner (September 1854 – 30 June 1931) was an English medical doctor and medical administrator. Turner was a powerful orator and made himself available to multiple medical committees. A staunch advocate of private medicine he disliked the movement to the nationalisation of medical health.

A lifelong devotee of sport and athletics, he was a rugby union player of some note while a youth. He played club rugby for St. George's Hospital and gained his first of three international caps when he was selected for England in 1875.

== Personal history ==
Turner was born in Chigwell, England in 1854. He was educated at Uppingham School before being accepted into St George's Hospital, where he qualified in 1876. He gained his Fellowship of the Royal College of Surgeons in 1891, and took up a private practice near Hyde Park in London. In 1912 he became a member of the Council of the British Medical Association, continuing to rise through the association as a Division chairman in 1913, and then President of the Metropolitan Counties Branch Council, from 1927-28.

Throughout his professional career, Turner was a member of numerous committees and medical bodies. During the First World War, he was the vice-chairman of the Central Medical War Committee under Sir Jenner Verrall. He was also a member of the Medico-Political Committee, Ministry of Health Committee, the Science Committee, Parliamentary Elections Committee and the Ophthalmic Committee. As a member of the BMA, Turner was in constant demand for special committees, bodies set up to explore a specific medical concern. He was a major voice in the National Council for Combating Venereal Diseases, and had an interest in the diseases both scientifically and socially.

Among his medical appointments, he was a visiting apothecary to his old College of St. George's Hospital, physician to St. Mary's College at Lancaster Gate and consulting physician at Princess Helena College.

== Rugby career ==
Turner played rugby football during the earliest days of the sport, and as a youth played for Uppingham School, and in his later life was president of the Old Uppinghamian Football Club. He joined the St. George's Hospital team as a student, and he gained his first international cap while playing for the hospital team. His first England game was against Ireland at the end of 1875 in a friendly encounter, and he entered the pack in one of the last international twenty-a-side games. England won 1-0. Turner missed the next match, though his brother Sir George Robertson Turner, was selected for his only international cap during that game.

Edward Turner played two more internationals for England; against Ireland in 1877 and again in 1878. In his third and final match, he scored his only international try, though as at the time tries did not carry any points.

== Bibliography ==
- Godwin, Terry (1984). The International Rugby Championship 1883–1983. Grafton Street, London: Willow Books. ISBN 0-00-218060-X.
- Griffiths, John (1982). The Book of English International Rugby 1872–1982. London: Willow Books. ISBN 0002180065.
