= Dawson Turner (rugby union) =

England international rugby union player

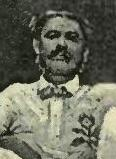
- Born: Dawson Palgrave Turner; 15 December 1846 Calcutta, India
- Died: 25 February 1909 (aged 62) Royal Tunbridge Wells, Kent, England
- School: Rugby School

Rugby union career
- Position: Forward
Senior career
Years	Team	Apps	(Points)
- University College FC
–	Richmond F.C.		
International career
Years	Team	Apps	(Points)
1871–1875	England	6	(0)

Dawson Turner (15 December 1846 – 25 February 1909) was a rugby union international who represented England from 1871 to 1875.

== Early life ==
Dawson Palgrave Turner was born on 15 December 1846 in Calcutta, India. He was the son of Gurney Turner (1813–1848) and Mary Anne Hamilton Mowatt. His paternal grandfather, after whom he was named, was Dawson Turner (1775–1858), the banker and botanist, and he got his middle name from his paternal grandmother, Mary Palgrave (1774–1850). He attended Rugby School

== Rugby union career ==
Turner, having played rugby at school, went on to play for Richmond F.C., one of the clubs of choice for Old Rugbeians. Turner made his international debut on 27 March 1871 at Edinburgh in the Scotland vs England match. Of the six matches he played for his national side he was on the winning side on three occasions. He played in the first five matches against Scotland, the only man to do so. He was described as a "desperately hardworking forward, always keen and untiring" and "regardless of risk or danger". He played his final match for England on 8 March 1875 at Edinburgh in the Scotland vs England match.

== Career and personal life ==
On 12 March 1867 he married Emma Morgan in St. John's Church, Toronto. They had at least two children, Harold Palgrave Turner (born 1872 in London) and Mary Hamilton Turner (born 1873 in Peterborough, Canada West). He initially trained as a doctor and in 1871 was student obstetrician at University College Hospital. By 1891 he had divorced Emma and described himself as a retired military officer. He died in March 1909 in England.
