= Aquilla Smith =

Irish doctor and numismatist

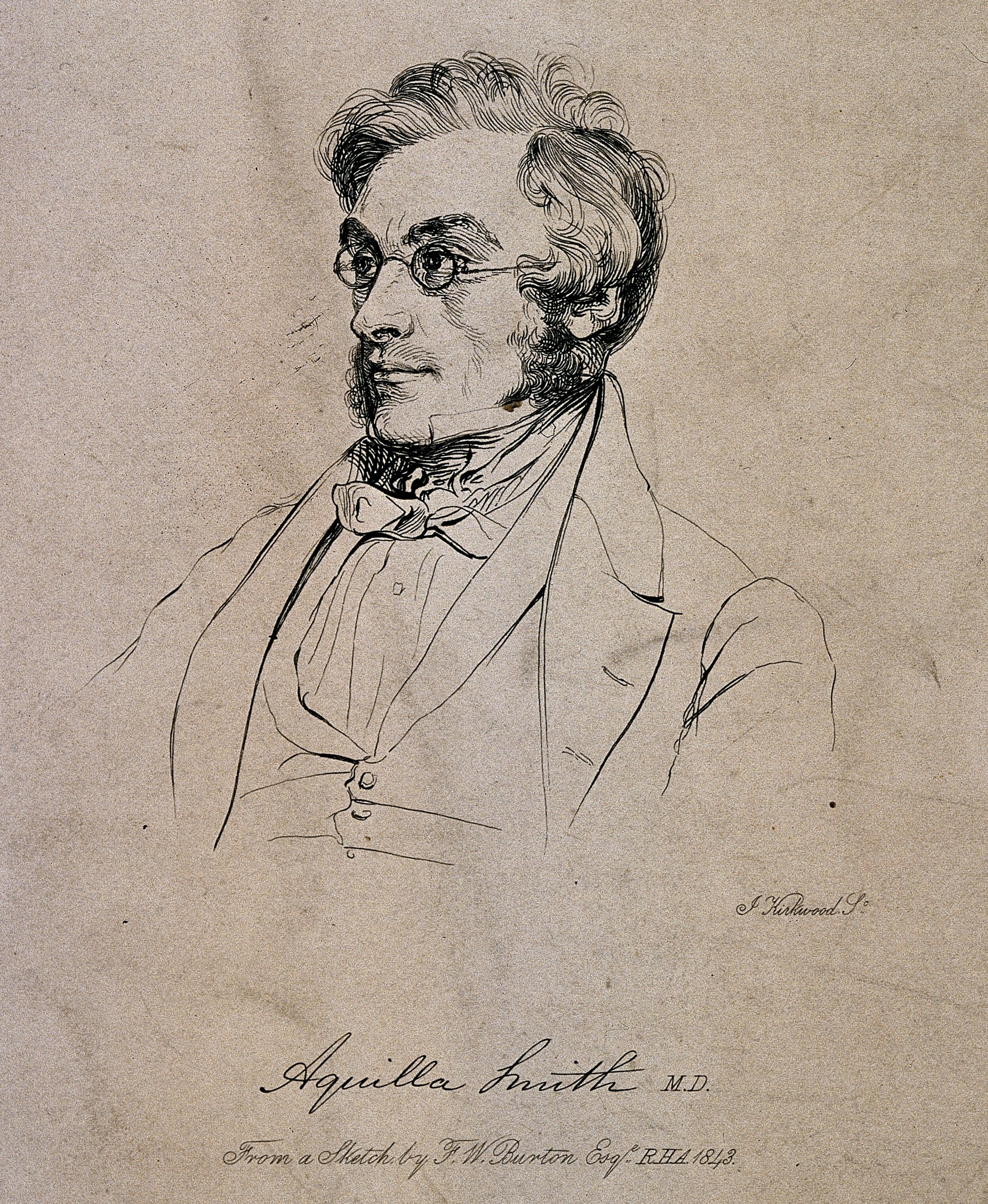
- Born: 28 April 1806; Nenagh, County Tipperary
- Died: 23 March 1890 (aged 83); Dublin
- Education: Trinity College, Dublin and Royal College of Surgeons of Ireland

Aquilla Smith (28 April 1806 – 23 March 1890) was a highly regarded medical doctor, numismatist and archaeologist. He represented the Irish College of Physicians on the General Medical Council for almost forty years, and was an authority on Irish numismatics.

== Personal life ==
Smith was born in Nenagh, County Tipperary. In 1831 he married his first cousin Esther, daughter of George Faucett, and they had thirteen children, including Vincent Arthur Smith.

== Medical career ==
Smith was educated privately in Dublin. He entered Trinity College Dublin in 1823, and went on to study at the Royal College of Surgeons in Ireland, but owing to ill-health, switched to medicine. He was licensed by the King and Queen's College of Physicians in Ireland in 1833, and received the degree of MD honoris causa in 1839. He also edited the Dublin Pharmacopaeia. Smith was King's Professor of Materia Medica and Pharmacy in the School of Physic from 1864 to 1881, and physician-in-ordinary to Sir Patrick Dun's Hospital. He represented the Irish College of Physicians on the General Medical Council from 1851 to 1890.

== Contribution to numismatics ==
Smith had an early interest in numismatics, encouraged by his friend Richard Sainthill] – nearly 500 illustrations in Sainthill's An Olla podrida (1853) were engraved from drawings made by Smith. Development work in Ireland in the first half of the nineteenth century – the making of canals, reclamation of wasteland, and digging for peat – unearthed an unprecedented amount of finds. Smith, together with numismatist John Lindsay (1789–1870) and philologist J. H. Todd (1805–1869), sought to study this material critically, turning from an antiquarian approach to an archaeological approach. Smith put together one of the finest collections of Irish coins and tokens, which he later sold to the Royal Irish Academy.

Smith was admitted as a Member of the Royal Irish Academy in 1835, was elected on to its Council in 1838, and became a Member of the Committee of Antiquities. He was an Honorary Member of the Royal Numismatic Society for over thirty years, and was the second recipient of the medal of the Royal Numismatic Society in 1884.

== Publications ==
Smith published numerous books and contributed articles to the Numismatic Chronicle, the Transactions and Proceedings of the Royal Irish Academy and the Dublin Journal of Medical Science. His illustrations were published in the Transactions of the Kilkenny Archaeological Society and elsewhere. The following list is a selection of his work:

- "Annales de Monte Fernandi" [Annals of Multifernan], ed. Aquilla Smith, Tracts relating to Ireland (Dublin, Irish Archaeological Society 1843
- 'A brief description of Ireland, 1590', Irish Archaeological Society
- 'Copy of the award concerning the Tolboll', Irish Archaeological Society
- 'Ancient Testaments: a letter of Oliver Cromwell to his son Henry', Irish Archaeological Society
- 'The Charter of John Lord of Ireland to the Abbey of Mellifont', Irish Archaeological Society
- 'A Journey to Connaught, April, 1709', Irish Archaeological Society

=== Publications on Irish coins ===
- "Kilkenny Tradesmen's Tokens", Transactions of the Kilkenny Archaeological Society vol. 2, part 1 (1853), p. 155
- "On the Ormonde Money", Transactions of the Kilkenny Archaeological Society vol. 3. 1856, p. 16
- "On the Copper Coin commonly called St Patrick's", Transactions of the Kilkenny Archaeological Society vol. 3. 1856, p. 67
- "On the Irish Pewter Coins of James II", Transactions of the Kilkenny Archaeological Society vol. 3. 1856, p. 141
- "On the Irish Coins of Mary", Transactions of the Kilkenny Archaeological Society vol. 3. 1856, p. 357
- "Catalogue of Silver Tokens issued in Ireland", Transactions of the Kilkenny Archaeological Society vol. 3. 1856, p. 364
- "Catalogue of Leaden and Pewter Tokens issued in Ireland", The Journal of the Kilkenny and South-East of Ireland Archaeological Society, New Series, vol. 2, 1859, p. 215
- "Money of Necessity, issued in Ireland in the reign of Charles the First", The Journal of the Kilkenny and South-East of Ireland Archaeological Society, New Series, vol. 3. 1861, pp. 11 and 134
- "On the Copper Tokens issued in Ireland, from 1728 to 1761", The Journal of the Historical and Archaeological Association of Ireland, vol. 1, Third Series, p. 417.
- "On the Irish Coins of Edward the Fourth", Transactions of the Royal Irish Academy (1841)
- "On the Irish Coins of Henry the Seventh", Transactions of the Royal Irish Academy (1841)
- "On an Unpublished Irish Coin of Edward the Fourth", Proceedings of the Royal Irish Academy vol. 2 (1841), p. 21
- "Catalogue of the Tradesmen's Tokens current in Ireland between the years 1687 and 1679", Proceedings of the Royal Irish Academyvol. 4 (1850), Appendix, No. iv
- "On certain Scotch Coins and Counterfeits found in Ireland", Proceedings of the Royal Irish Academy, vol. 5 (1853), p. 824
- "Supplement to a Catalogue of Tradesmen's Tokens current in Ireland in the Seventeenth Century", Proceedings of the Royal Irish Academy (1859), Appendix, No. vii
- "On the Irish coins of Richard III", Numismatic Chronicle, vol. 1, p. 310
- "Saxon coins found in Ireland", Numismatic Chronicle, vol. 2, p. 103
- "When was money first coined in Ireland?", Numismatic Chronicle, vol. 2, p. 308
- "Mode of coining hammered money in Persia", Numismatic Chronicle, vol. 2, pp. 298–299
- "The human hand on Hiberno-Danish coins", Numismatic Chronicle, vol. 3, p. 32
- "Did Suein coin money in England?", Numismatic Chronicle, vol. 3, p. 63
- "Nummi Pelliculati", Numismatic Chronicle, vol. 5, p. 67
