= Simon Holmes (rugby union) =

Scotland international rugby union footballer

- Born: Simon David Holmes; 12 December 1966 (age 59) Workington, England
- Height: 5 ft 10 in (1.78 m)
- Weight: 16 st 0 lb (102 kg)
- University: University of Cambridge

Rugby union career
- Position: flanker
Senior career
Years	Team	Apps	(Points)
1998-1999	London Scottish		
1999-2000	Northampton Saints		
International career
Years	Team	Apps	(Points)
1998-1998	Scotland	3	(3)

Simon Holmes (born 12 December 1966) is an English-born former rugby union footballer, who made three appearances for Scotland, as a flanker.

== Early life ==
Holmes was born in Workington, England. In 1990 he captained the Cambridge University rugby team.

== Rugby playing career ==
A former captain of Cambridge University, in 1998 he was playing club rugby for London Scottish and captained the team in their inaugural season in the premiership. In 1999 he moved to play for Northampton Saints and won a Heineken cup winners medal as part of the squad that beat Munster in the 2000 final.

Holmes appeared three times for Scotland, all during the 1998 Five Nations Championship and was Vice Captain for 2 of these three appearances. He made his international debut against Italy at Treviso in January 1998. His last cap was against France at Murrayfield in February 1998.
