= Imperial Medicals Rugby Club =

English rugby union club, based in London

(England) Imperial Medicals Rugby Club
- Full name: Imperial Medicals Rugby Club
- Union: Middlesex RFU
- Nickname: Imperial Medics
- Founded: 1997 through merger of two older sides Constituent elements: 1865 - St Mary's Hospital RFC; 1984 - Charing Cross & Westminster Hospitals RFC(itself a merger of two older sides)
- Location: Heston, Hounslow, London, England
- Ground: Harlington Sports Ground (Capacity: 400)
- Chairman: Dr Freddie Banks
- Director of Rugby: Liam
- Captain: Hamzah Raza (Club Captain) Elliot Crouch(1XV Captain)
- League: BUCS South East 2B

Official website
- www.imrfc.co.uk

Imperial Medicals Rugby Club ("Imperial Medics") is the name given to the rugby union team of Imperial College School of Medicine Students' Union, a modern amalgam of three formerly distinct hospital rugby clubs each with a long history, having all been founded in the nineteenth century. The teams from Charing Cross Hospital and Westminster Hospital were the first to merge in 1984 following the union of their respective Medical Departments. When St Mary's Hospital, London also merged in 1997 the team was strengthened by one of the two most successful hospital sides in London. Imperial Medics is notable for its recent dominance of the oldest competition in rugby, the United Hospitals Cup, as well as its history and the joint history of its constituent elements which have produced a large number of international players.

== History ==
The history of Imperial Medicals Rugby Club is the combined history of three older sides, and their joint history from the point of merger:

- St Mary's Hospital Medical School - October 1865
- Charing Cross Hospital Medical School - 1875
- Westminster Hospital Medical School - 1897
- Charing Cross and Westminster Medical School - 1981
- Imperial College School of Medicine - 1997

== Competitions ==
Since Inauguration in 1997 IMRFC have enjoyed the following successes:

- United Hospitals Cup Winners - 98, 99, 00, 02, 03, 04, 05, 06, 07, 08, 10, 11, 14
- United Hospital Cup Sevens Winners - 00, 04, 05, 06, 08, 12, 13, 17
- J. P. R. Williams Cup Winners (IMRFC v Imperial College) - 03, 04, 05, 06, 07, 08, 09, 10, 11, 14
- Winners of Herts/Middlesex 1 Courage League and Promotion to London North West 3 - 1999
- Promotion to BUSA Premiership South in 1999, 2003, 2006, 2010
- 2nd XV United Hospitals Cup Winners - 01, 03, 06, 07, 08, 10, 11, 14
- 2nd XV Varsity Match Winners - 05, 06, 07, 08, 09, 10, 11, 15
- 2nd XV Middlesex Merit League Division 3 Winners - 07
- 3rd XV United Hospitals Cup Winners - 01, 02, 03, 06, 07, 08, 09, 10, 11, 12, 13, 14, 15
- 3rd XV Varsity Match Winners - 05, 06, 07, 08, 09, 10, 11, 14, 17

United Hospital Challenge Cup wins
Hospital Team	First Competed	Last Competed	Current Status	Wins	Total Wins including constituent elements
Imperial Medics	1998	present	Active	13	51
St Mary’s	1874	1997	Part of Imperial Medics	32	32
Charing X/ Westminster	1983	1997	Part of Imperial Medics	3	6
Westminster	1897	1982	Part of Imperial Medics	3	3
Charing Cross	1875	1982	Part of Imperial Medics	0	0

== Notable former players ==
=== Internationals ===
==== St Mary's ====
- Ireland - : D J Cussen (1921-27)
- England - Tuppy Owen-Smith (1934-37) - captain, also 5 caps for the South Africa cricket team
- England - Tommy Kemp (1937-48) - captain
- England - Edward Scott (1947-48) - captain
- England - Nim Hall (1947-55)
- England - Norman "Billy" Bennett (1947-48)
- England - Lewis Cannell (1948-57)
- Ireland - : Jim Murphy-O'Connor (1954)
- Scotland - N M Campbell (1956)
- England - Trevor Wintle (1966-69)
- Wales - J. P. R. Williams (1969-81)
- England - Kevin Simms (1985-88)
- Wales - Richard Wintle (1988)

==== Westminster ====
- (United Kingdom) Sidney Nelson Crowther (1903)

==== Imperial Medicals ====
- England - Nnamdi Obi - England Sevens, England Students
- England - James Logan - England Students
- Greece - Dimitri Amiras - Greece
- England - Tom Rees
- Cyprus - Vaki Antoniou

=== Notable non-internationals ===
- David Rocyn-Jones, a former president of the Welsh Rugby Union
