= Bruce Thomson (footballer) =

Australian rules footballer (born 1955)

Personal information
- Full name: Bruce Thomson
- Born: 1 October 1955 (age 71)
- Original team: Newtown & Chilwell
- Height: 188 cm (6 ft 2 in)
- Weight: 81 kg (179 lb)

Playing career^{1}
Years	Club	Games (Goals)
1975	Geelong	2 (1)
- ^{1} Playing statistics correct to the end of 1975.

Bruce Thomson (born 1 October 1955) is a former Australian rules footballer who played with Geelong in the Victorian Football League (VFL).
