= William O'Neill (rugby union) =

Irish rugby union player

- Full name: William Arthur O'Neill
- Born: 15 November 1928 Dublin, Ireland
- Died: 15 January 1985 (aged 56) Dublin, Ireland

Rugby union career
- Position: Prop
International career
Years	Team	Apps	(Points)
1952–54	Ireland	6	(0)

William Arthur O'Neill (15 November 1928 — 15 January 1985) was an Irish international rugby union player.

Born in Dublin, O'Neill was raised in the suburb of Mount Merrion, as one of 11 siblings. He was educated at Castleknock College and University College Dublin, playing rugby with both.

O'Neill, a prop, captained Leinster and gained six Ireland caps between 1952 and 1954, also making uncapped appearances on their 1952 tour of Argentina. He was captain of the Wanderers side which claimed the 1959 Leinster Senior Cup title, beating his former club Lansdowne in the final.

== See also ==
- List of Ireland national rugby union players
