= Bruce Thomson (rugby union) =

Scotland international rugby union player (1930–2020)

- Born: Bruce Ewan Thomson; 19 November 1930 Assam, British India
- Died: 13 January 2020 (aged 89) Crieff, Scotland

Rugby union career
- Position: Prop
Amateur team(s)
Years	Team	Apps	(Points)
- Oxford University
–	London Scottish		
International career
Years	Team	Apps	(Points)
1953	Scotland	3	(0)

Bruce Thomson (19 November 1930 – 13 January 2020) was a Scotland international rugby union player. Thomson played as a Prop. He was also a noted bagpiper.

== Rugby union career ==
=== Amateur career ===
Thomson played rugby for Oxford University. He later played rugby for London Scottish.

=== International career ===
Thomson was capped for Scotland 3 times in 1953.

== Outside of rugby ==
=== Medical career ===
Thomson became a doctor, working as a GP in Horsham, Sussex.

=== Bagpipes ===
Thomson learned the bagpipes at Aberdeen Grammar School.

After school he joined the army where he was taught by Pipe Major Donald McLeod. He composed more than 450 bagpipe tunes and performed for the Queen. He was influenced by Seumas MacNeill, Pipe Major Brian McRae and the members of The Royal Scottish Pipers Society.

Thomson published several books of his bagpipe tunes.

=== Later life and death ===
Thomson later retired to Crieff, Perthshire. He died there on 13 January 2020, at the age of 89.
