= United Hospitals Cup =

Rugby cup competition

- Sport: Rugby union
- Founded: 1875; 151 years ago
- Country: United Kingdom
- Region: London
- Most recent champions: Barts and The London (2026)
- Most titles: St Mary's (32 titles)

The United Hospitals Challenge Cup is contested by the six medical schools in London and is most notable for being the oldest rugby cup competition in the world.

== History ==
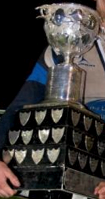
The trophy awarded

In 1874 the United Hospitals RFC instituted a cup competition, the "United Hospitals Challenge Cup", also known as the "Inter-Hospital Challenge Cup". The first final was played on Wednesday 3 March 1875 at The Oval, which had also been the site of England's first home rugby international three years earlier. The match predated by four years the first Calcutta Cup match and is the oldest cup competition in the game of rugby. The first final was contested between Guy's Hospital and St George's Hospital in front of 400 spectators. Guy's, wore an orange and blue kit, and kicked the game off, whilst their opponents wore green jersey, green shorts with brown socks. Guy's won but St George's got their revenge the next season. When this game was played matches were won by goals rather than points. A goal was a converted try, and tries themselves only value in the case of a draw in which case they would be counted up as the deciding factor. Guy's Hospital won the game by 1 Goal (a converted try) and 1 try to 2 tries. The records say that the three additional 'tries' were all defensive touch downs. The game was also notable for fielding 15 players per side at a time when all international matches, the Varsity Match, County matches and all other top level games were being played with 20 players per side and would continue to do so until 1877. In this regard, the United Hospitals RFC was a pioneer. With the exception of breaks for the two world wars of the twentieth century and COVID-19, the United Hospitals Challenge Cup has been played for without interruption since that first final.

The Royal Veterinary College was invited to join the competition for the first time after a vote was taken during the AGM on 13 May 2008.

The current holders are Barts and The London who beat Imperial Medicals 16-5 at The Rock, Rosslyn Park F.C.’s ground in Barnes in March 2026.

== Winners ==
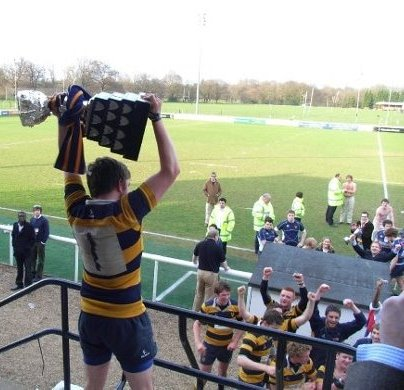
2009 Winner - Guy's Hospital RFC

- 1875 Guy's
- 1876 St George's
- 1877 Guy's
- 1878 St Thomas's
- 1879 Guy's
- 1880 St George's
- 1881 St Bart's
- 1882 St George's
- 1883 St Bart's
- 1884 London
- 1885 London
- 1886 Guy's
- 1887 Middlesex
- 1888 St Thomas's
- 1889 St Thomas's
- 1890 St Thomas's
- 1891 Not Completed
- 1892 St Thomas's
- 1893 St Thomas's
- 1894 St Thomas's
- 1895 St Thomas's
- 1896 St Thomas's
- 1897 St Thomas's
- 1898 Guy's
- 1899 Guy's
- 1900 St Mary's
- 1901 Guy's
- 1902 Guy's
- 1903 Guy's
- 1904 London
- 1905 Guy's
- 1906 London
- 1907 Guy's
- 1908 London
- 1909 Guy's
- 1910 Guy's
- 1911 Guy's
- 1912 Guy's
- 1913 Guy's
- 1914 London
- 1915 No Competition
- 1916 No Competition
- 1917 No Competition
- 1918 No Competition
- 1919 No Competition
- 1920 Guy’s
- 1921 Guy’s
- 1922 Guy’s
- 1923 Guy’s
- 1924 St Bart’s
- 1925 Guy’s
- 1926 St Thomas’s
- 1927 Guy’s
- 1928 St Bart’s
- 1929 Guy’s
- 1930 Guy’s
- 1931 St Bart’s
- 1932 Guy’s
- 1933 Guy’s
- 1934 St Mary’s
- 1935 St Mary’s
- 1936 St Mary’s
- 1937 St Mary’s
- 1938 St Mary’s
- 1939 St Mary’s
- 1940 No Competition
- 1941 No Competition
- 1942 No Competition
- 1943 No Competition
- 1944 No Competition
- 1945 No Competition
- 1946 St Mary's
- 1947 Not Played
- 1948 Guy's
- 1949 St Mary's
- 1950 St Thomas's
- 1951 St Mary's
- 1952 St Mary's
- 1953 St Mary's
- 1954 St Thomas's
- 1955 London
- 1956 St Mary's
- 1957 London
- 1958 St Thomas's
- 1959 St Mary's
- 1960 St Thomas's
- 1961 Guy's
- 1962 St Thomas's
- 1963 St Mary's
- 1964 St Thomas's
- 1965 London
- 1966 Guy's
- 1967 St Mary's
- 1968 London
- 1969 St Bart's
- 1970 St Bart's
- 1971 Guy's
- 1972 St Mary's
- 1973 St Mary's
- 1974 Westminster
- 1975 Westminster
- 1976 St Bart’s
- 1977 St Bart’s
- 1978 St Mary's
- 1979 St Mary's
- 1980 St Mary's
- 1981 St Mary's
- 1982 Westminster
- 1983 St Mary's
- 1984 St Mary's
- 1985 St Mary's
- 1986 London
- 1987 St Mary's
- 1988 St Mary's
- 1989 St Mary's
- 1990 St Mary's
- 1991 St Mary's
- 1992 St Mary's
- 1993 Charing X/ Westminster
- 1994 St Mary's
- 1995 Charing X/ Westminster
- 1996 Charing X/ Westminster
- 1997 Guy's and St. Thomas' RFC
- 1998 Imperial Medicals
- 1999 Imperial Medicals
- 2000 Imperial Medicals
- 2001 G.K.T.
- 2002 Imperial Medicals
- 2003 Imperial Medicals
- 2004 Imperial Medicals
- 2005 Imperial Medicals
- 2006 Imperial Medicals
- 2007 Imperial Medicals
- 2008 Imperial Medicals
- 2009 G.K.T.
- 2010 Imperial Medicals
- 2011 Imperial Medicals
- 2012 Barts and The London
- 2013 Barts and The London
- 2014 Imperial Medicals
- 2015 RUMS RFC
- 2016 St George's
- 2017 Barts and The London
- 2018 RUMS RFC
- 2019 G.K.T.
- 2020 St George's
- 2020+1 No Competition
- 2022 Barts and The London
- 2023 Barts and The London
- 2024 Barts and The London
- 2025 RUMS RFC
- 2026 Barts and The London

== Statistics ==
United Hospital Challenge Cup wins
Hospital Team	First	Last	Current status	Wins	Total wins
Guy's, King's and St Thomas'	1999	present	Active	3	51
Imperial Medicals	1997	present	Active	13	51
Royal Hospitals	1996	present	Active	8	28
St George's	1874	present	Active	5	5
RUMS	1998	present	Active	3	4
The Royal Veterinary College	2009	present	Active	0	0
Guy's and St. Thomas'	1990	1998	Part of Guy's, King's and St Thomas'	1	48
King's College Hospital	1874	1998	Open club so no longer eligible. Medics represented by Guy's, King's and St Thomas'	0	0
Middlesex	1874	1997	Part of RUMS	1	1
Royal Free	?	1997	Part of RUMS	0	0
University College Hospital	?	1997	Part of RUMS	0	0
St Mary's	1874	1996	Part of Imperial Medics	32	32
Charing X/ Westminster	1984	1996	Part of Imperial Medics	3	6
London	1874	1995	Part of Royal Hospitals	11	11
St Bart's	1875	1995	Part of Royal Hospitals	9	9
Guy's	1874	1990	Part of Guy's, King's and St Thomas'	31	31
St Thomas's	1874	1990	Part of Guy's, King's and St Thomas'	16	16
Westminster	1874	1983	Part of Imperial Medics	3	3
Charing Cross	1874	1983	Part of Imperial Medics	0	0

== See also ==
- List of oldest rugby union competitions
- Rugby union trophies and awards
