= 1903–04 Scottish Districts season =

Rugby union competition

- Countries: Scotland
- Date: 1903–04
- Matches played: 1

The 1903–04 Scottish Districts season is a record of all the rugby union matches for Scotland's district teams.

== History ==
Edinburgh District beat Glasgow District in the Inter-City match.

== Results ==
Date	Try	Conversion	Penalty	Dropped goal	Goal from mark	Notes
1894–1904	3 points	2 points	3 points	4 points	4 points	

=== Inter-City ===
5 December 1903

Glasgow District	0 - 2 gls, 5 tries	Edinburgh District
	Report

Hamilton Crescent, Glasgow

Glasgow District:
Edinburgh District:

=== Other Scottish matches ===
26 December 1903

South of Scotland District	6 - 22	Anglo-Scots
	Report

Hawick

South of Scotland:
Anglo-Scots:

=== English matches ===
No other District matches played.

=== International matches ===
No touring matches this season.
