= Sir Patrick Dun's Hospital =

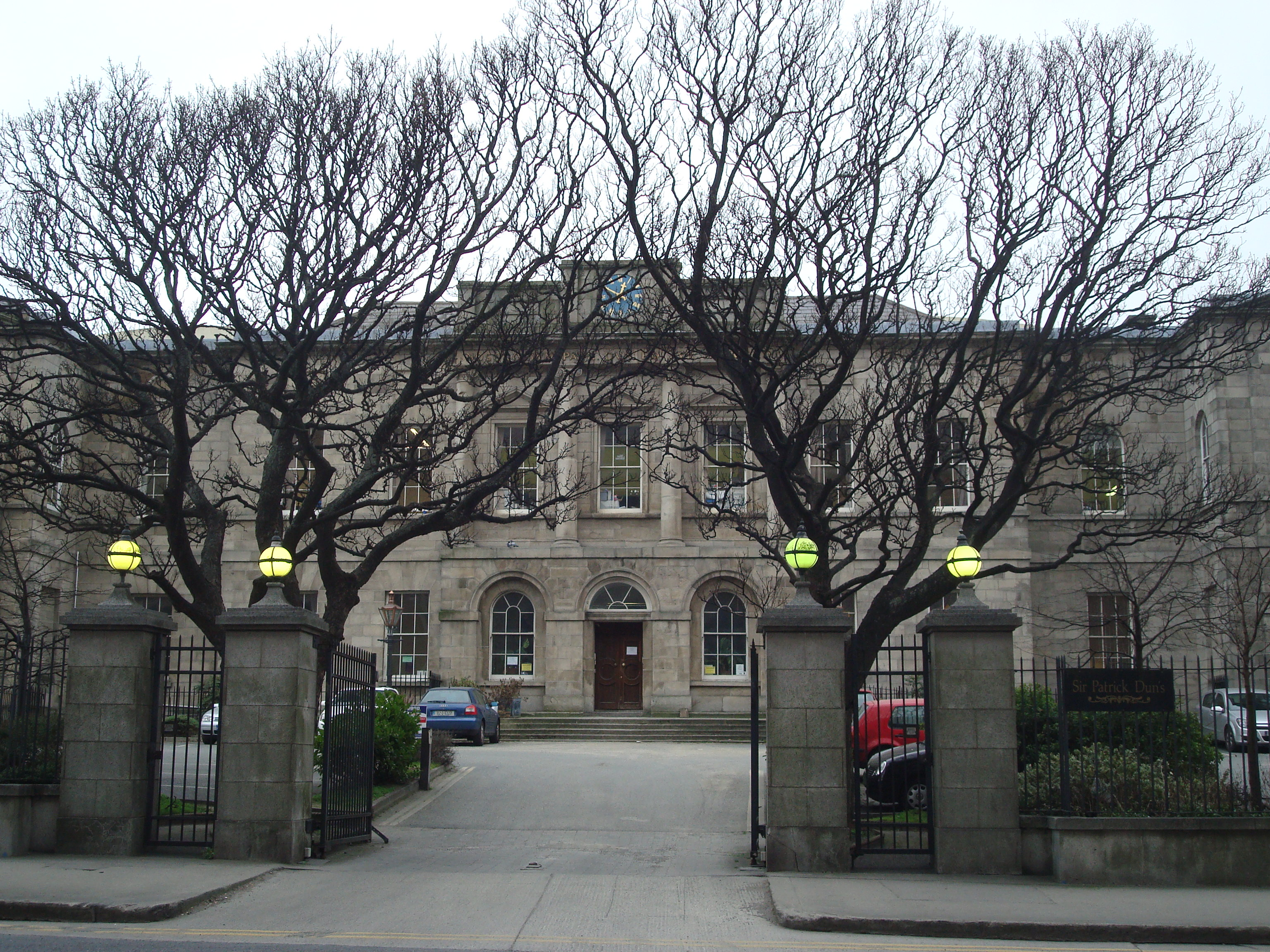
- Front granite facade of the hospital

General information
- Type: Hospital
- Architectural style: Georgian
- Location: Grand Canal Street, Dublin, Dublin, Ireland
- Coordinates: 53.338954°N 6.241174°W
- Groundbreaking: 1802
- Opened: 1808
- Closed: 1986

Design and construction
- Architect: Richard Morrison

Renovating team
- Architects: Charles Astley Owen (1890-95) - new East Wing and operating theatre

Sir Patrick Dun's Hospital (Irish: Ospidéal Sir Patrick Dun) was a hospital and school for physicians on Grand Canal Street, Dublin, Ireland.

== History ==
Sir Patrick Dun, a prominent physician in Ireland, died in 1713, leaving income-generating property in County Waterford in trust to the Royal College of Physicians of Ireland. He also left enough money to fund the construction of the Thomas Burgh designed Anatomy House within Trinity College Dublin which in turn created the medical school within the college.

On 14 January 1788, due to a desire to have a School of Physic for clinical lectures, the Royal College of Physicians of Ireland set up a clinical hospital in a house on Clarendon Street. This served its purpose until a report on 14 August 1790 showed that the costs were too high compared to other hospitals. On 8 November 1790, the hospital was closed and its equipment was distributed to Mercer's Hospital and Dr Steevens' Hospital.

On 9 July 1792, a house on Wellington Quay (previously Blind Quay) was leased by the college and it was opened as Sir Patrick Dun's Hospital, in memory of the college's benefactor, on 27 September 1792. This address did not last very long, as on 16 February 1793 it is noted that the college appointed a Physician in Ordinary at Sir Patrick Dun's Hospital on Lower Exchange Street. The hospital was initially kept open all year round but later opened for only part of the year.

=== Grand Canal Street ===
The School of Physic Act 1800 entrusted eight commissioners to appropriate the £1,200 already given to the college for the provision of a hospital that was capable of holding thirty patients. The commissioners were the Sackville Hamilton, the Provost of Trinity College, the President of the College of Physicians, Sir Francis Hutchinson Baronet, the Hon George Knox, Dr Arthur Browne, William Digges La Touche and Abraham Wilkinson Esquires. They chose the land at Grand Canal Street with a 998-year lease signed 10 May 1802. By 1808, £6,346 of Sir Patrick Dun's funds had been spent building the west wing of the hospital, but it was not enough. Parliamentary aid was sought and £6,204 was granted to finish the building of the hospital, furnish it and run it temporarily. The design of the building, with its granite facade, is said to have been influenced by George Papworth. It was completed on 24 June 1808 and the hospital was handed over to the Board of Governors. The school opened for clinical instruction on 25 October 1808.

As well as providing clinical instruction for medical students Dun's Hospital also taught midwifery and trained army nurses. The first scientific nursing training in Ireland was introduced at the hospital by Margaret Huxley in the 1880s. One of the earliest medical reports of the effects of X-rays can be found in a letter sent from one of the hospital's assistant physicians to the British Medical Journal in 1896.

After services transferred to St. James's Hospital, Sir Patrick Dun's Hospital closed in 1986.

The building was later used by the Institute of Clinical Pharmacology that year

Since the mid-1990s, part of the building has been used by the superintendent registrar of births, deaths and marriages to host civil ceremonies and is more commonly referred to as the registry office.

== Notable people ==
- Jonathan Osborne (1794–1864), appointed physician about 1830.
- James Craig (1861–1933), physician to the hospital, was a professor of medicine and an independent TD.
- Aquilla Smith (1806–1890), physician-in Ordinary and represented the Irish College of Physicians on the General Medical Council from 1851 to 1890.
- Anne Young, founder of the first Irish school of general nursing.

== Sources ==
- Belcher, T.W. (1866). Memoir of Sir Patrick Dun. Hodges Smith & Co., Grafton Street.
