= Royal Free, University College and Middlesex Medical Students RFC =

(England) Royal Free, University College and Middlesex Medical Students RFC
- Full name: Royal Free, University College and Middlesex Medical Students RFC
- Union: Middlesex RFU
- Nickname: RUMS RFC
- Founded: 1867 – oldest constituent element 1998 through merger of three older sides
- Location: Bloomsbury, London, England
- Ground: Eton Manor RFC
- President: Charles Aldridge
- Captain: Ieuan Phillip
- League: BUCS SE 2B

Official website
- www.rumsrugby.com

Royal Free, University College and Middlesex Medical Students RFC is the rugby union club for UCL Medical School, which is part of the University of London. The rugby club is commonly referred to by its shortened name of RUMS RFC or RUMS Rugby. The club is registered with the RFU and plays in the traditional colours of the medical school: blue, yellow and black.

RUMS RFC is one of the largest and most successful clubs of UCL Medical School, with over 50 members and three teams competing in the BUCS SE league.

== History ==
The London teaching hospitals began playing rugby union in the 1860s, with many of its members former Cambridge and Oxford graduates. The United Hospitals Rugby Football Club was formed in 1867, before the founding of the Rugby Football Union, and by 1874 had initiated the United Hospital's Challenge Cup, a competition for the rival hospitals. Although Guy's provided far more international rugby players, the United Hospital club saw many notable players join the team, including notable Barbarian, Brigadier Glyn Hughes.

The Royal Free and University College Medical School was formed in 1998 following a series of mergers between a number of existing medical schools: in 1987 the Middlesex Hospital Medical School (founded 1746) merged with University College Medical School (1825) to form the University College and Middlesex School of Medicine. In 1998 the University College and Middlesex School of Medicine merged with the Royal Free Hospital Medical School to form the Royal Free and University College Medical School. In 2008 the medical school changed its name to UCL Medical School; however at a meeting in 2009 all the medical school sports teams voted to alter their traditional name slightly, adding Middlesex, to honour the heritage of the Middlesex medical school. Thus the club name changed to The Royal Free, University College and Middlesex Medical Students (RUMS), not using the new medical school name.

The current rugby club is an amalgamation of the rugby clubs of these previous medical schools. Thus the club has a history of competing in the oldest rugby competition in the world, the United Hospitals Cup, in one guise or another since 1874.

== Teams ==
- 1st XV: The 1st XV of RUMS RFC has been competing at a very high level for several seasons. They are currently the highest ranked sports team within UCL Medical School and the highest within University College London rugby.
- 2nd XV: This team is also known as 'The Boars', a nickname descending from the Middlesex Hospital Medical School rugby team.
- 3rd XV: As of March 2009, a 3rd XV has been created, playing under the name of 'The Piglets'. This team acts as a training buffer for potential Boars.

== Competitions ==
- United Hospitals Cup: The 1st XV compete annually in this prestigious competition, first winning the trophy on 6 March 2015 by beating Imperial Medicals 20-6. This was the first time RUMS or any of its constituent medical schools won the trophy in 128 years. The team then went on to win the competition again in 2018 defeating Barts 34-18 in the final. The club won the 2025 edition of the competition, defeating Bart's and The London RFC 27-0 in the final, securing its 3rd title since the merger of the constituent medical schools, and 4th overall.
- BUCS SE 1A: The 1st XV competes in the highest university league of the SE area of England.
- BUCS SE 4B
- BUCS SE 7B
- Munich Sevens: RUMS RFC competes annually in this international tournament, entering two teams. The club won the plate competition for 11 years straight, but this succession was broken by Munich RFC in 2007, when RUMS, led by Toby Ikwueke, lost a thrilling final for the first time. This monopoly of the plate competition has led the Bavarian organisers dubbing RUMS RFC as the 'plate specialists'. In the 2009 competition the 1st VII reached the cup final, knocking out hosts Munich in an epic semi-final. The team lost a very close final to the British Army team, 'The Rifles'.
- Bill Smith Cup: This is held every December between the first and second years of the medical school. It was named in honour of Prof. Bill Smith who was a great supporter of the rugby club during his time teaching at UCL Medical School.

United Hospital Challenge Cup wins
Hospital Team	First Competed	Last Competed	Current Status	Wins	Total Wins including constituent elements
RUMS RFC	1998	present	Active	3	4
Middlesex	1874	1997	Part of RUMS RFC	1	1
Royal Free	?	1997	Part of RUMS RFC	0	0
University College Hospital RFC	?	1997	Part of RUMS RFC	0	0

== Internationals ==
Over the years the club and its predecessor clubs have fostered a number of international players, these include

=== University College Hospital ===
- (England) Dawson Turner (1871-75)
- (England) John Biggs (1878-79)
