= St. George's Hospital Medical School RFC =

English rugby union club, based in London

(England) St. George's Hospital Medical School
- Full name: St. George's Hospital Medical School Rugby Football Club
- Union: Rugby Football Union
- Founded: 1863; 163 years ago
- Location: London, England
- Ground(s): Wimbledon RFC, London
- Captain(s): Oliver Kinnaird-Barr; Daniel Sinclair
- League(s): BUCS South Eastern Tier 2B; BUCS South Eastern Tier 5B
Team kit

Official website
- sghmsrfc.ghost.io

St. George's Hospital Medical School RFC is one of the oldest rugby clubs in the world having been founded in 1863, eight years before the foundation of the RFU. The side is notable for its long history, its participation in the oldest competition in rugby, the United Hospitals Cup, as well as having produced a large number of international players, especially in the sport of rugby's formative years.

== History ==
St. George's Hospital Medical School RFC was founded in 1863 for the students of the St. George's Hospital Medical School. Despite its founding date, it was not one of the founding clubs of the rugby football union in 1871. The club saw its match list increase as there was an expansion in the number of clubs, and in 1867 the United Hospitals RFC was formed as a focal point for the London Medical Schools. This body instituted in 1874 the cup competition known as the United Hospitals Challenge Cup (also known as the Inter-Hospital Challenge Cup) and St George's was in the first final played on Wednesday 3 March 1875 at The Oval. The match predated by four years the first Calcutta Cup match and is the oldest cup competition in the game of rugby. The opponents were Guy's Hospital Football Club and was played in front of 400 spectators. Guy's, wore an orange and blue kit, and kicked the game off, whilst St George's wore green jersey, green shorts with brown socks. Guy's won but St George's got their revenge the next season. When this game was played matches were won by goals rather than points. A goal was a converted try, and tries themselves only value in the case of a draw in which case they would be counted up as the deciding factor. Guy's Hospital won the game by 1 Goal (a converted try) and 1 try to 2 tries. The records say that the three additional 'tries' were all defensive touch downs. The game was also notable for fielding 15 players per side at a time when all international matches, the Varsity Match, County matches and all other top level games were being played with 20 players per side and would continue to do so until 1877.

St George's went on to win the cup twice more, in 1880 and 1882. Notably, St George's also fielded 5 international players in the 1870s. However, after St George's triumph in 1882 there was a dry spell of 134 years before the club was triumphant once more in 2016, defeating RUMS in a spectacular fashion. The University is in fact the only one of the United Hospitals members that is in the same form as it was at inception, the other schools all having been through a series of mergers and in most cases renaming. This is due to George's being the only remaining freestanding medical school in the country. However, it is still able to field two competitive male rugby sides; as well a ladies team.

== Competition ==
The team competes twice a week throughout the year and plays in the British University leagues, the Surrey league (as Georges-Mitcham although in the Surrey League simply known as Mitcham) and the National Association of Medics Cup as well as the aforementioned United Hospitals Cup. They have won the Inter-Hospital Challenge Cup on five occasions, all apart from two of which were within the first decade of the competition:

- 1876
- 1880
- 1882
- 2016
- 2020

The team reached the final of the competition during the 2010–2011 season, finishing Runner-up to Imperial College.

Following this, and a further series of appearances in the finals, St George's won the United Hospital Cup in 2016, beating RUMS in a close final with a penalty kick during last play securing a 13-12 victory. This was the first time that SGHMS RFC have won in 134 years.

On 28 February 2020, St George's won their 5th UH cup beating RUMS 21-12.

United Hospital Challenge Cup wins
| Hospital Team | First Competed | Last Competed | Current Status | Wins | Total Wins including constituent elements |
|---|---|---|---|---|---|
| St George's | 1874 | present | Active | 5 | 5 |

== International players ==
- England - James Mackinlay (first capped 1872)
- England - William Edward Collins (first capped 1875)
- England - Edward Beadon Turner (first capped 1875)
- England - George Robertson Turner (first capped 1876)
- England - Henry Herbert Taylor (first capped 1879)

Capped prior to playing for St George's:

- England - William Eldon Tucker (first capped 1894)
- Scotland - Alfred Clunies-Ross (first capped 1871)
