= Rugby union in London =

Rugby union is one of the most popular sports, in terms of both participants and spectators in London. London has several of England's leading rugby union clubs, and the city is home to 13 teams playing in national leagues, and many regional amateur leagues regulated by the London and South East Division Rugby Football Union. However, several of these teams, due to necessity, have found homes at stadia outside the boundaries of the capital. The sport is well established, especially in the middle-class suburbs to the north and west of the city. Four of the twelve clubs currently in the Gallagher Premiership have London origins.

In more recent years, a modern tradition has seen the four leading London clubs play out of Twickenham Stadium during the first round of the Premiership, in a double-header.

== History ==
Barnes Rugby Football Club, formerly known simply as the Barnes Club, is a rugby union club which is claimed by some sources to be the world's first and oldest club in any code of football. The club, from Barnes in London, also played a major role in the early years of association football, and was one of the teams in the first ever game of football. Blackheath F.C. is the oldest open rugby club in the world. "Open" in this context means that membership was open to anyone, not merely those attending, or old boys from, a particular institution (e.g. a school, university or hospital). It is also the third-oldest rugby club in continuous existence in the world, after Dublin University Football Club and Edinburgh Academical Football Club. The Blackheath club also helped organise the world's first rugby international (between England and Scotland in Edinburgh on 27 March 1871) and hosted the first international between England and Wales ten years later – the players meeting and getting changed at the Princess of Wales public house. Blackheath, along with Civil Service FC, is one of the two clubs that can claim to be a founder member of both the Football Association and the Rugby Football Union.

== Clubs ==
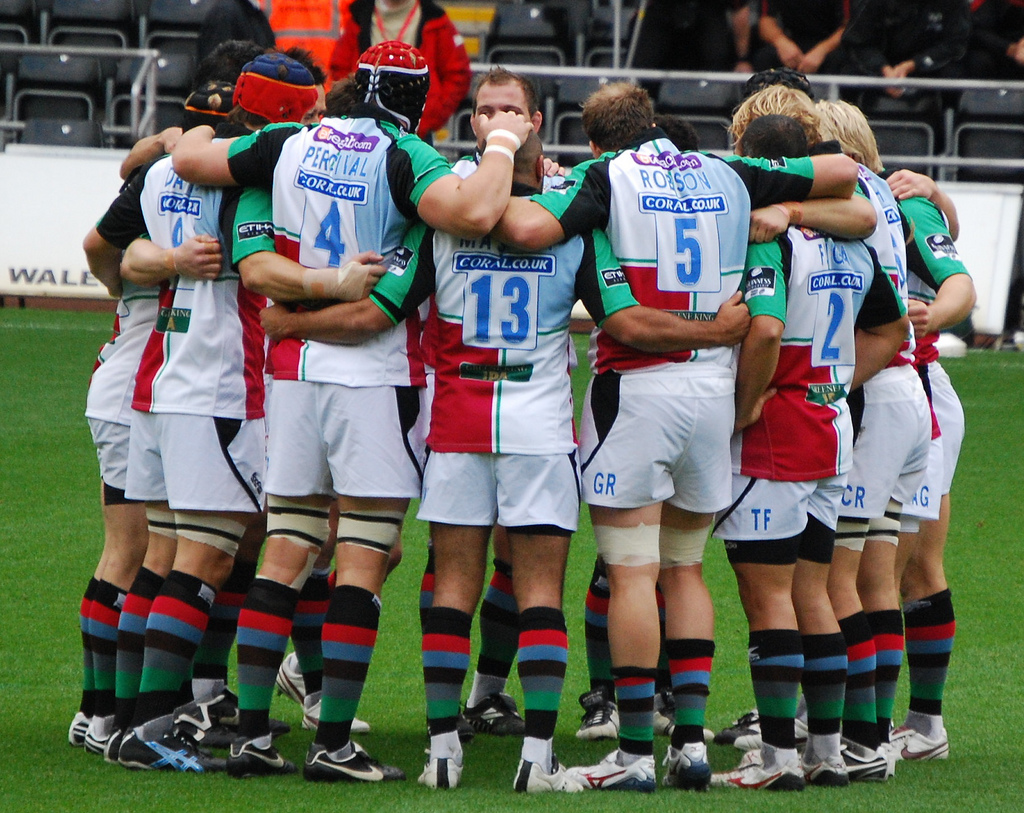
Harlequins in a huddle during the 2008–2009 season

London has several teams playing rugby at the National League level, in levels 1-5.

These teams play in the Premiership:

- Harlequins
- Saracens

These other Greater London teams compete in the RFU Championship:

- Ealing Trailfinders
- London Scottish
- Richmond

There is also Wasps RFC with links to the London area. Once nicknamed [and called] 'London Wasps' they have played at many locations since the development of the professional game. These have included Loftus Road, followed by High Wycombe and now Coventry. Their affiliated Amateur side, Wasps FC, still play at the original ground in Acton.

Another club with London roots, London Welsh, have bounced between the Premiership and Championship in recent years, having been promoted to or relegated from the Premiership at the end of each season since 2011–12. When they were first promoted for the 2012–13 season, they moved outside the metropolitan area to play at Oxford United's Kassam Stadium in Oxford. They remained in Oxford until their most recent relegation at the end of the 2014–15 season, after which they returned to Greater London at Old Deer Park in Richmond. The club went into liquidation in January 2017, and had its results for season 2016-17 expunged from the record. However, the club's amateur arm continues due to holding separate registration.

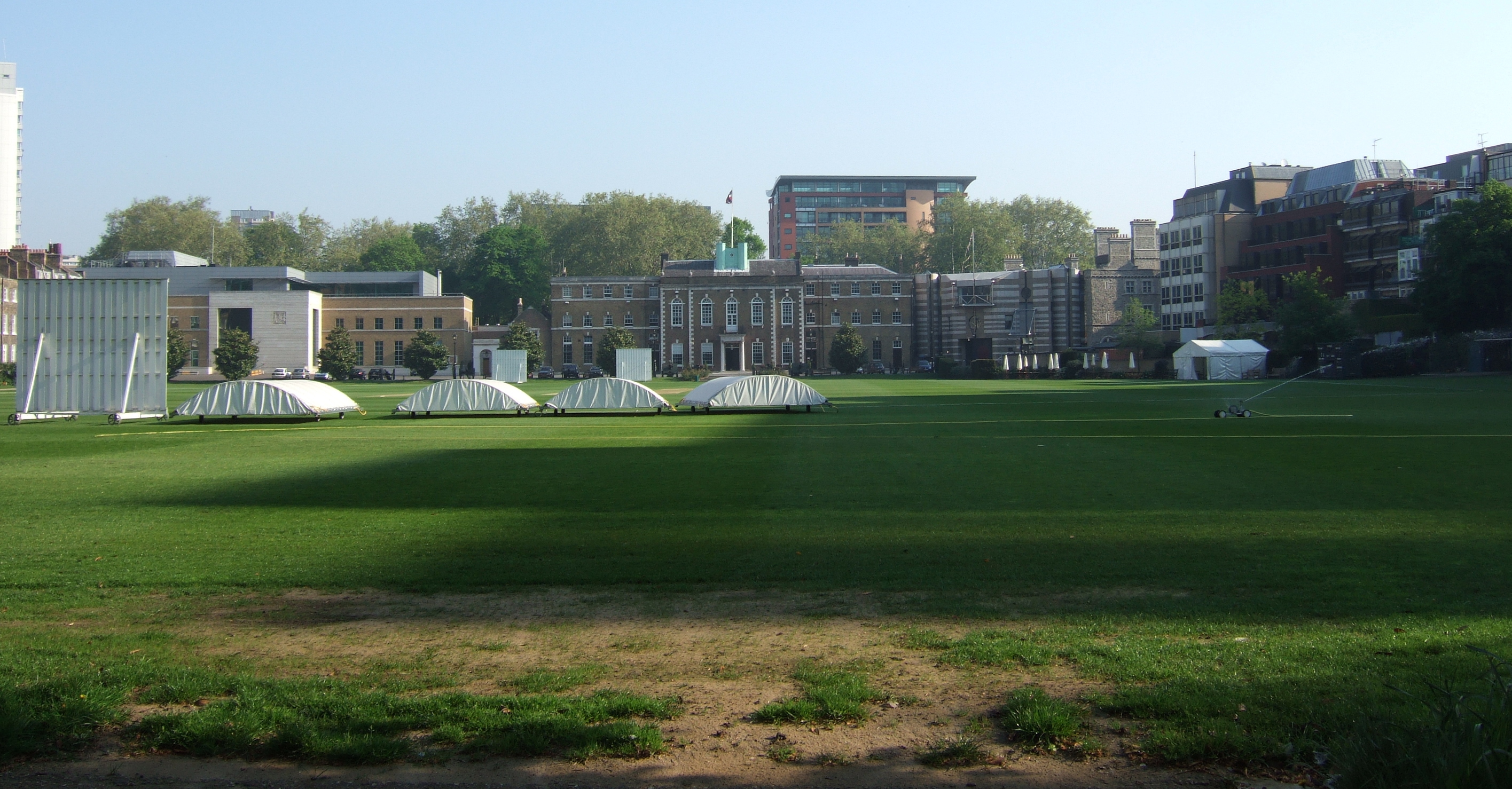
The Artillery Ground where HAC RFC play

The remaining teams play at lower levels of the pyramid:

- Old Streetonians RFC - train at Haggerston Park and play matches at Hackney Marshes
- Barking
- Barnes
- Blackheath
- Chiswick RFC
- CS Rugby 1863 (Civil Service)
- Hackney RFC
- Hammersmith & Fulham RFC
- Rosslyn Park
- Westcombe Park
- London Cornish
- London Irish Amateur - an amateur side with extensive links to the professional London Irish RFC
- London Welsh Amateur - the former amateur arm of the liquidated professional London Welsh RFC
- Wasps FC – an amateur side with extensive links to the professional Wasps side
- Sutton & Epsom RFC - play at "Rugby Lane" in the London Borough of Sutton
- Staines Rugby Football Club – play at the "Reeves" in the London Borough of Hounslow
- Streatham-Croydon RFC play at Frant Road in the heart of South London
- Honourable Artillery Company RFC - play at Artillery Ground on City Road in the City of London

Still another Premiership club with London roots, Wasps moved their home matches entirely outside the London commuter belt to Coventry in December 2014. Shortly before their move, Wasps purchased the major football ground Ricoh Arena, and share it with Coventry City F.C. Wasps maintained their training base within Greater London in West Acton until June 2016 but are now fully based in the West Midlands.

== International rugby ==
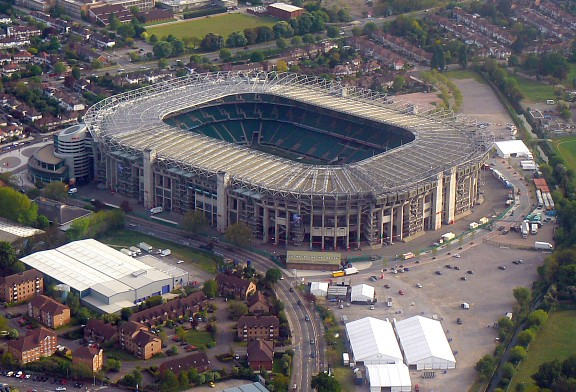
Twickenham Stadium

The England national rugby union team play their home matches at Twickenham Stadium during the Six Nations Championship, as well as the November inbound touring nations. The ground also hosted the Rugby World Cup finals in 1991, in which Australia defeated England, and 2015, with New Zealand defeating Australia. Twickenham hosts the final of the Anglo-Welsh Cup, and has hosted the final of European club rugby's top competition, now known as the European Rugby Champions Cup, five times, most recently in 2015. The stadium is also host to The Varsity Match between Oxford and Cambridge as well as the English schools' Daily Mail Cup final. London was also home to the massive celebrations for the English rugby team when they returned home from Australia after winning the 2003 Rugby World Cup, where Jonny Wilkinson kicked a drop-goal in extra time. An estimated 750,000 gathered in Trafalgar Square to celebrate their arrival.

=== Sevens ===
In rugby sevens, Twickenham Stadium annually hosts the London Sevens, the final event of the annual World Rugby Sevens Series for men's national teams. In 2014–15, it also hosted the third-place match and Cup (championship) final of the London Women's Sevens, part of the World Rugby Women's Sevens Series. The remainder of the latter event was held at the nearby Twickenham Stoop. The London Women's Sevens was originally planned to be an annual event, but did not appear on the 2015–16 series schedule.

== See also ==
- Rugby union in England
- Rugby union in the British Isles
