= Rugby union in the British Isles =

- Country: Great Britain and Ireland
- Governing body: Rugby Football Union (England); Scottish Rugby Union (Scotland); Welsh Rugby Union (Wales); Irish Rugby Football Union (Ireland)
- National team(s): British & Irish Lions; British and Irish Lionesses; Teams of the Home Nations (Note: England national rugby union team, England women's national rugby union team, Scotland national rugby union team, Scotland women's national rugby union team, Wales national rugby union team, Wales women's national rugby union team, Ireland national rugby union team, Ireland women's national rugby union team.)
- First played: 1823, Rugby

National competitions
- Rugby World Cup; Six Nations; Rugby World Cup Sevens; World Rugby Sevens Series; London Sevens; Women's Rugby World Cup; Women's Six Nations; World Rugby Women's Sevens Series (All competed as individual Home Nations)

Club competitions
- See list

Rugby union is a popular sport in the British Isles (Great Britain and Ireland), including England, Wales, Scotland and Ireland. The game was arguably invented in 1823 by William Webb Ellis, and in 1871 the English Rugby Football Union was the first national rugby football union to be founded. It is organised separately in each of these countries, and also on an all-Ireland basis.

Rugby union in the British Isles is discussed in the following articles, corresponding to the separate organisations governing the sport:

- Rugby union in England
- Rugby union in Ireland
- Rugby union in Scotland
- Rugby union in Wales

And also in the Crown Dependencies:

- Rugby union in Guernsey
- Rugby union in Jersey
- Rugby union in the Isle of Man

And also in various British Overseas Territories:

- Rugby union in Anguilla
- Rugby union in the Cayman Islands
- Rugby union in Gibraltar
- Rugby union in the British Virgin Islands

However areas where the sport is similar between the Home Nations will be discussed in this article.

== National team ==
=== Men's ===
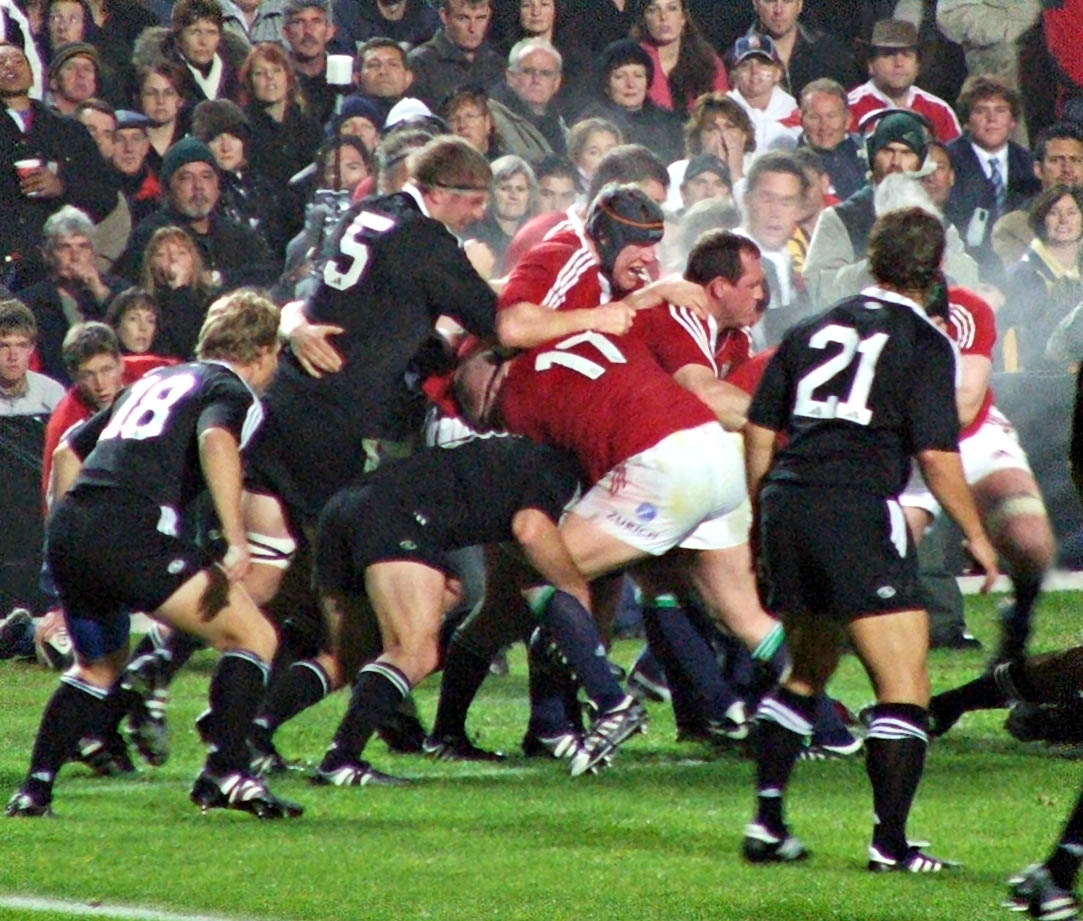
British & Irish Lions vs Māori All Blacks during the 2005 British & Irish Lions tour to New Zealand

Unlike in rugby league, no combined British and Irish national rugby union team has ever competed in a major tournament such as the Rugby World Cup. Instead, the British & Irish Lions go on tours to the traditional Southern Hemisphere nations of Australia, New Zealand and South Africa, currently occurring on a four-year cycle; the first was an 1888 tour to New Zealand and Australia. The team also plays in select one-off matches as preparation for the tour test series.

In major competition the Home Nations represent themselves as:

- England national rugby union team
- Scotland national rugby union team
- Wales national rugby union team
- Ireland national rugby union team

=== Women's ===
There is also a unified Great Britain women's national rugby union team; however, in most cases, women's rugby also sees the Home Nations represented individually by:

- England women's national rugby union team
- Scotland women's national rugby union team
- Wales women's national rugby union team
- Ireland women's national rugby union team

== Domestic competitions ==
The Home Nations run individual competition across four league systems:

- English rugby union system
- Scottish rugby union system
- Welsh rugby union system
- Irish rugby union system

== Stadiums ==
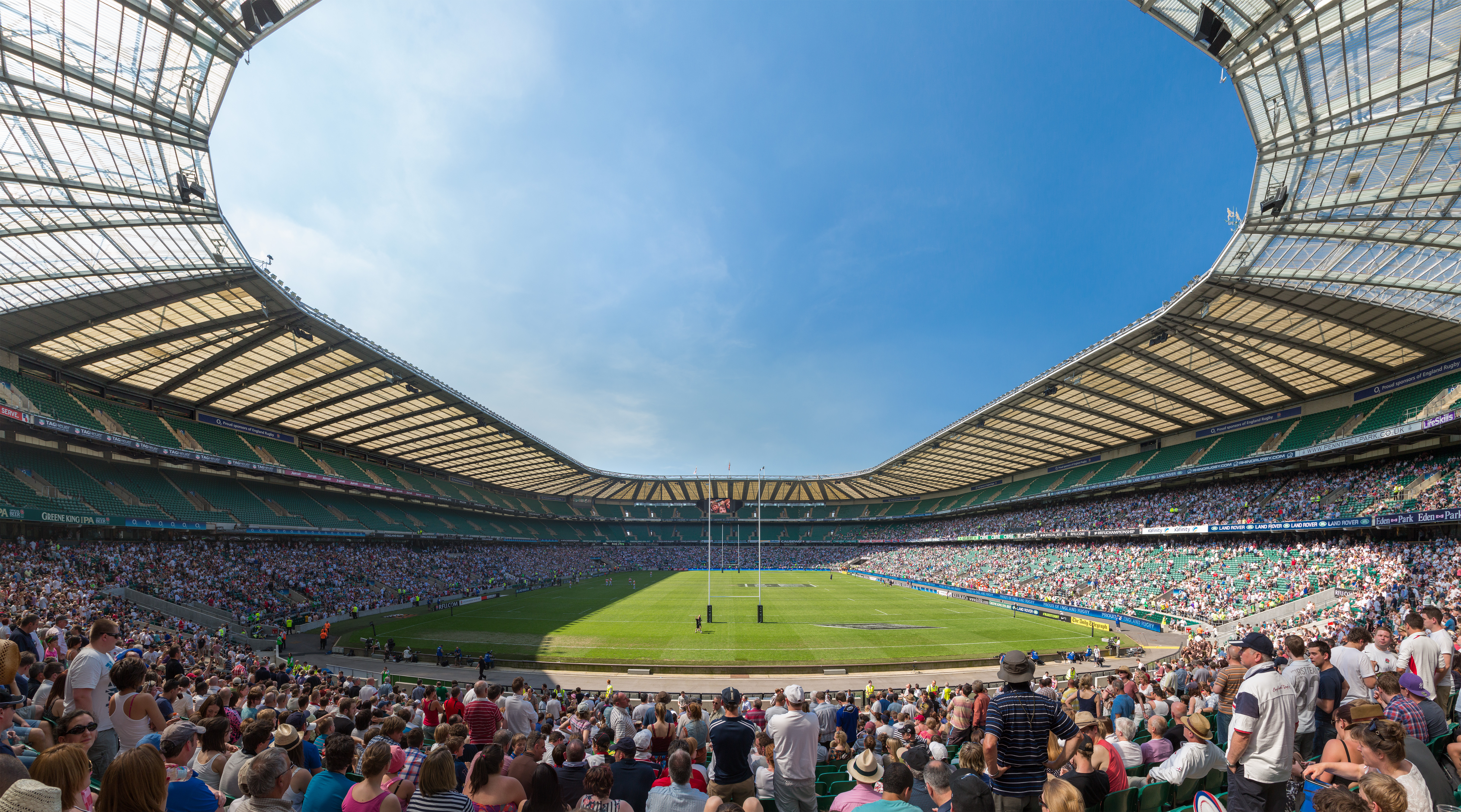
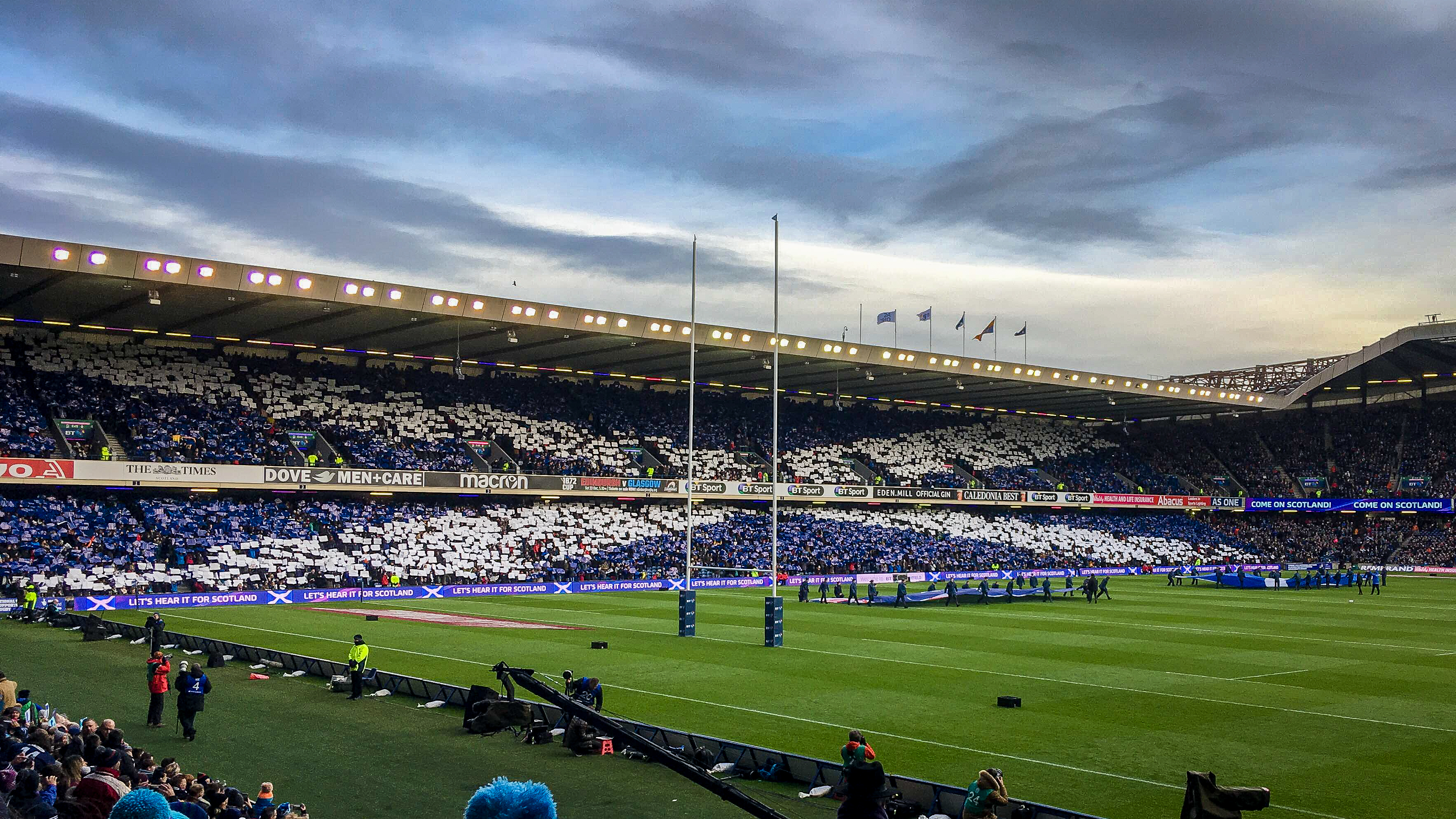
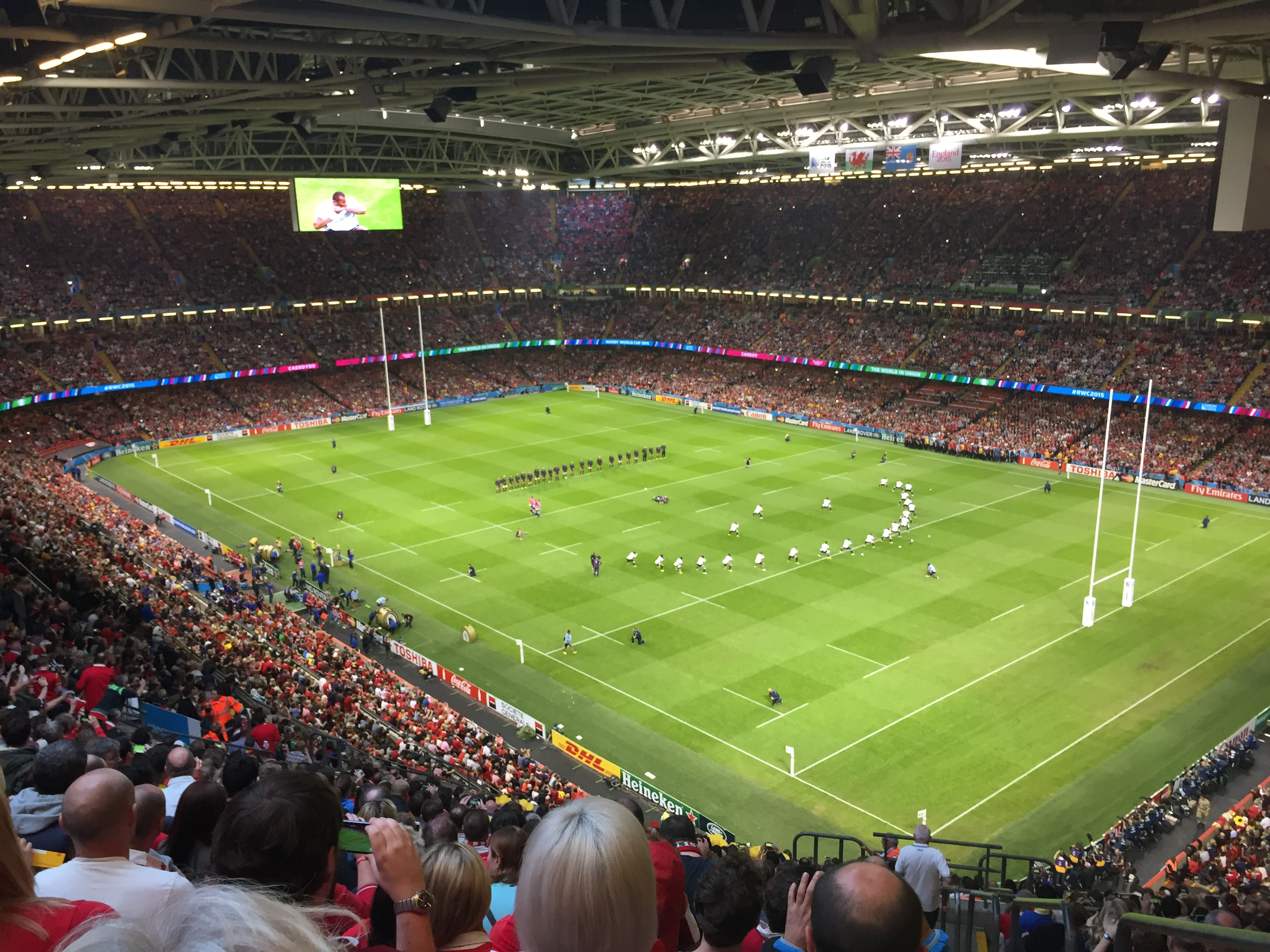
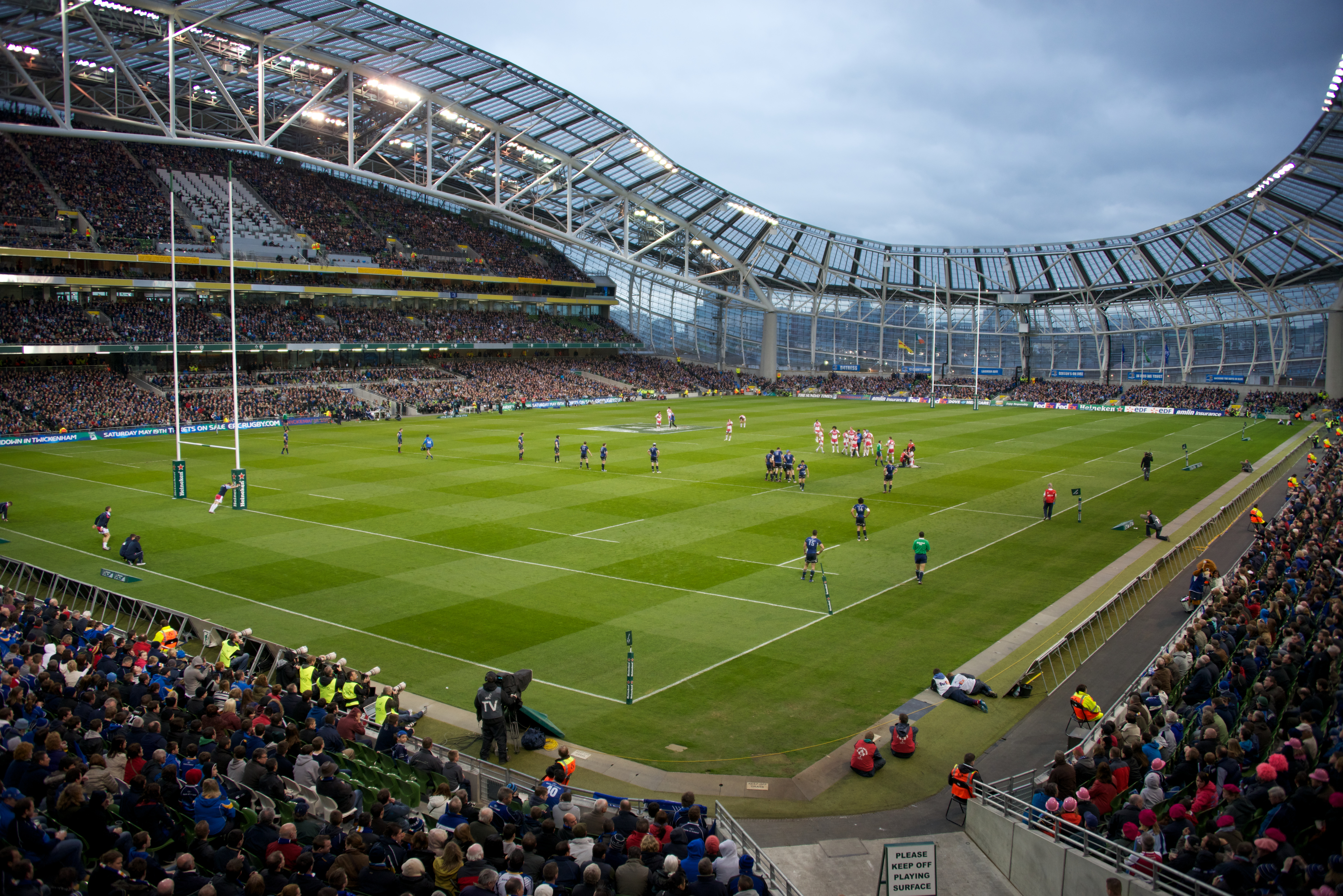
The four national rugby union stadiums within the British Isles.

Each national team has their own national stadium:

- Twickenham Stadium for England
- Murrayfield Stadium for Scotland
- Millennium Stadium for Wales
- Aviva Stadium for Ireland

== Tournaments hosted ==
XV

Competition	Year	Home Nations who Hosted
Rugby union at the Summer Olympics	1908	England; Scotland; Wales; Ireland
Rugby World Cup (M)	1991	England; Scotland; Wales; Ireland
Rugby World Cup (W)	1991	Wales
Rugby World Cup (W)	1994	Scotland
Rugby World Cup (M)	1999	Wales (Note: Wales were the only official hosts however matches were played across England, Scotland, and Ireland, as well as France.)
Rugby World Cup (W)	2010	England
Rugby World Cup (M)	2015	England (Note: Wales's Millennium Stadium was also used as a venue.)
Rugby World Cup (W)	2017	Ireland
Rugby World Cup (W)	2025	England

Sevens

Competition	Year	Home Nations who Hosted
Rugby World Cup Sevens	1993	Scotland
Rugby World Cup Sevens	1997	British Hong Kong
Rugby sevens at the Commonwealth Games	2002	England
Rugby sevens at the Commonwealth Games	2014	Scotland
Rugby sevens at the Commonwealth Games	2022	England

== Rugby Sevens ==
Rugby Sevens is a version of Rugby Union played with seven players per side instead of the usual fifteen. The home nations field individual national teams however the, what could be considered the United Kingdom's greatest achievement in the sport came in the 2016 Summer Olympics, as two united Great Britain teams competed in the inaugural edition of the sport's tournament at the Summer Olympics. The Great Britain teams were formed only ten weeks prior to the games and saw the men's team reach the final achieving a runners up place, and the women's team achieved fourth.

=== National teams ===
Great Britain

- Great Britain national rugby sevens team
- Great Britain women's national rugby sevens team

Home nations

- England national rugby sevens team
- England women's national rugby sevens team
- Scotland national rugby sevens team
- Scotland women's national rugby sevens team
- Wales national rugby sevens team
- Wales women's national rugby sevens team
- Ireland national rugby sevens team
- Ireland women's national rugby sevens team

== See also ==
- British & Irish Lions
- Rugby league in the British Isles
