= Middlesex RFU Senior Vase =

English rugby union competition

- Sport: Rugby Union
- Instituted: 2002; 24 years ago
- Number of teams: 7
- Country: England
- Holders: London Welsh RFC (1st title) (2018–19)
- Most titles: Harrow, Old Streetonians (2 titles)
- Website: Middlesex RFU

The Middlesex RFU Vase is an annual rugby union knock-out club competition organised by the Middlesex Rugby Football Union and donated by Russell Grant Founder of the Federation of Middlesex Sports. It was first introduced during the 2002–03 season, with the inaugural winners being London French. It is the third most important cup competition organised by the Middlesex RFU, behind the Senior Cup and Senior Bowl.

The Senior Vase is currently open to all club sides based in the historic county of Middlesex not eligible for the Senior Cup or Senior Vase, typically playing between tiers 9 (Herts/Middlesex 1) and tiers 10 (Herts/Middlesex 2) of the English rugby union league system. The format is a knockout cup with a first round, semi-finals and a final to be held at one of the finalist's home ground between March–June (although final dates can vary drastically).

== Middlesex Senior Vase winners ==
Middlesex Senior Vase Finals
Season	Winner	Score	Runners–up	Venue
2002–03	London French		St Nicholas Old Boys	
2003–04	St Nicholas Old Boys		Sudbury & London Springboks	
2004–05	Old Abbotstonians		Hendon	
2005–06	Old Isleworthians	19–13	Hendon	
2006–07	Old Haberdashers		Old Isleworthians	
2007–08	Hendon	15–7	Old Isleworthians	Copthall Playing Fields, Hendon, London
2008–09	Old Grammarians	21–10	Hendon	World's End Lane, Winchmore Hill, London
2009–10	HAC	36–8	Harrow	Grove Field, Stanmore, London
2010–11	Harrow	30–16	Old Actonians	Old Actonians Sports Ground, Acton, London
2011–12	Hackney	28–7	Kilburn Cosmos	Gladstone Park, Dollis Hill, London
2012–13	Harrow	39–12	Hackney	Grove Field, Stanmore, London
2013–15	No competition			
2015–16	Old Streetonians	41–3	Hillingdon Abbots	Hackney Marshes, Hackney, London
2016–17	Old Streetonians	65–13	Hillingdon Abbots	Gainsborough Road, Hayes, London
2017–18	Finsbury Park	37-36	Saracens Amateurs	Bramley Sports Ground, Enfield, London
2018-19	London Welsh	34-12	Finsbury Park	Old Deer Park, Richmond, London

== Number of wins ==
- Harrow (2)
- Old Streetonians (2)
- HAC (1)
- Hackney (1)
- Hendon (1)
- Finsbury Park (1)
- London French (1)
- London Welsh (1)
- Old Abbotstonians (1)
- Old Grammarians (1)
- Old Haberdashers (1)
- Old Isleworthians (1)
- St Nicholas Old Boys (1)

== See also ==
- Middlesex RFU
- Middlesex Senior Cup
- Middlesex Senior Bowl
- English rugby union system
- Rugby union in England
