= Senior Cup =

Senior Cup may refer to one of the following sporting competitions:

Cricket

- Irish Senior Cup (cricket)
- Leinster Senior League Cup (cricket)
- North West Senior Cup (cricket)

Field hockey

- Leinster Schoolgirls' Senior Cup (field hockey)
- Men's Irish Senior Cup (field hockey)
- Ulster Schoolgirls' Senior Cup (field hockey)
- Women's Irish Senior Cup (field hockey)

Football (soccer)

- Amateur Football Alliance Senior Cup
- Bedfordshire Senior Cup
- Berks & Bucks Senior Cup
- Carmarthenshire Senior Cup
- Connacht Senior Cup (association football)
- Cumberland Senior Cup
- Devon Senior Cup
- East Riding Senior Cup
- Gloucestershire Senior Cup
- Herefordshire Senior Cup
- Huntingdonshire Senior Cup
- Isle of Wight Senior Cup
- Kent Senior Cup
- Leicestershire and Rutland Senior Cup
- Leinster Senior Cup (association football)
- Lincolnshire Senior Cup
- Middlesex Senior Cup
  - Middlesex Senior Charity Cup
- Munster Senior Cup (association football)
- Norfolk Senior Cup
- North West Senior Cup (football)
- Northamptonshire Senior Cup
- Pembrokeshire Senior Cup
- Peterborough Senior Cup
- Staffordshire Senior Cup
- Surrey Senior Cup
- West Wales FA Senior Cup
- Wiltshire County FA Senior Cup
- Worcestershire Senior Cup

Rugby

- Connacht Schools Rugby Senior Cup
- Connacht Senior Cup (rugby union)
- Devon RFU Senior Cup
- Durham County RFU Senior Cup
- Leinster Schools Rugby Senior Cup
- Leinster Senior Cup (rugby union)
- Middlesex RFU Senior Cup
- Munster Schools Rugby Senior Cup
- Munster Senior Cup (rugby union)
- North Gloucestershire Combination Senior Cup
- Northumberland Senior Cup (rugby union)
- Somerset Senior Cup
- Staffordshire Senior Cup (rugby union)
- Stroud and District Combination Senior Cup

See also

- CECAFA Cup, also known as the CECAFA Senior Challenge Cup
- COSAFA Cup, also known as the COSAFA Senior Challenge Cup
- Senior Bowl (disambiguation)
