= Senior Bowl (disambiguation) =

The Senior Bowl is an annual college football all-star game.

Senior Bowl may also refer to:

- Middlesex RFU Senior Bowl, an annual rugby union knock-out club competition held in England
- Senior Bowl (bridge), a biennial world championship contract bridge tournament, also known as the d'Orsi Bowl

See also

- Lockheed D-21, an American supersonic reconnaissance drone, code named SENIOR BOWL
- Senior Cup (disambiguation)
