= Middlesex RFU Senior Cup =

English rugby union competition

- Sport: Rugby Union
- Instituted: 1971; 55 years ago
- Number of teams: 4
- Country: England
- Holders: CS Rugby 1863 (4th title) (2017–18)
- Most titles: Wasps (8 titles)
- Website: Middlesex RFU

The Middlesex RFU Senior Cup is an annual rugby union knock-out club competition organised by the Middlesex Rugby Football Union. It was first introduced during the 1971–72 season, with the inaugural winners being Saracens. It is the most important cup competition organised by the Middlesex RFU ahead of the Senior Bowl and Senior Vase. The cup was originally open to all sides in Middlesex, including such illustrious names as Harlequins, Saracens and Wasps, but after the 1986–87 season and the incorporation of the Courage Leagues the cup was for limited to the smaller clubs in the county (what were considered 'junior' sides).

The Senior Cup is currently open to the top 8 club sides based in the historic county of Middlesex (London/Greater London) that typically play between tiers 6–7 of the English rugby union league system – although only 5 sides entered during the 2016–17 competition. The format is a knockout cup with a first round, semi-finals and a final to be held at one of the finalist's home ground between March–June.

== Middlesex Senior Cup winners ==
Middlesex Senior Cup Finals
Season	Winner	Score	Runners–up	Venue
1971–72	Saracens	9–0	Metropolitan Police	Bramley Road
1972–73	Metropolitan Police		Old Gaytonians	
1973–74	Wasps	14–9	Metropolitan Police	
1974–75	Wasps	6–0	Saracens	
1975–76	Saracens	13–6	Wasps	
1976–77	Wasps		Metropolitan Police	
1977–78	Wasps	12–4	Saracens	Repton Avenue, Sudbury, London
1978–79	Wasps		Metropolitan Police	
1979–80	Saracens		Wasps	
1980–81	Metropolitan Police	12–10	Saracens	
1981–82	Wasps		Old Gaytonians	
1982–83	Harlequins		Wasps	
1983–84	Wasps		Harlequins	
1984–85	Rosslyn Park		West London Institute	
1985–86	Saracens		Wasps	
1986–87	Wasps		Harlequins	
1987–88	Finchley	Old Merchant Taylors'		
1988–89	Ealing		Ruislip	
1989–90	Ealing		Ruislip	
1990–91	Ruislip		Ealing	
1991–92	Ruislip		Ealing	
1992–93	Ruislip		Grasshoppers	
1993–94	Ealing		Staines	
1994–95	Ruislip		Grasshoppers	
1995–96	Staines		Old Merchant Taylors'	
1996–97	Staines		Ruislip	
1997–98	Staines		Ruislip	
1998–99	Staines		Old Merchant Taylors'	
1999-00	London Nigerian		Staines	
2000–01	London Nigerian		Staines	
2001–02	Twickenham		London Scottish	
2002–03	London Nigerian		London Scottish	
2003–04	Ealing Trailfinders		London Scottish	
2004–05	Ealing Trailfinders	36–23	CS Rugby 1863	
2005–06	Ealing Trailfinders		London Nigerian	
2006–07	Ealing Trailfinders		Enfield Ignatians	
2007–08	CS Rugby 1863		Ruislip	
2008–09	Staines	38–12	Hammersmith & Fulham	The Reeves, Hanworth, Greater London
2009–10	Staines	37–14	Ruislip	The Reeves, Hanworth, Greater London
2010–11	Staines	33–27	Ruislip	The Reeves, Hanworth, Greater London
2011–12	No competition (Note: The 2011–12 final was supposed to be between Ruislip v Ealing Trailfinders at Snakey Lane (Ruislip RFC) but was cancelled.)			
2012–13	Chiswick	36–20	Staines	The Reeves, Hanworth, Greater London
2013–14	No competition			
2014–15	CS Rugby 1863	20–12	Hammersmith & Fulham	Hurlingham Park, Fulham, London
2015–16	Chiswick	39–37 (aet)	CS Rugby 1863	Dukes Meadow, Chiswick, London
2016–17	CS Rugby 1863	53–29	Chiswick	Dukes Meadow, Chiswick, London
2017–18	CS Rugby 1863	28-23	H.A.C.	Dukes Meadow, Chiswick, London
2018-19				

== Number of wins ==
- Wasps (8)
- Ealing Trailfinders (7)
- Staines (7)
- CS Rugby 1863 (4)
- Ruislip (4)
- Saracens (4)
- London Nigerian (3)
- Chiswick (2)
- Metropolitan Police (2)
- Harlequins (1)
- Finchley (1)
- Rosslyn Park (1)
- Twickenham (1)

== See also ==
- Middlesex RFU
- Middlesex Senior Bowl
- Middlesex Senior Vase
- English rugby union system
- Rugby union in England
