= Hackney Road =

London arterial route in the London Boroughs of Hackney and Tower Hamlets

Coordinates: 51.5311°N 0.0682°W

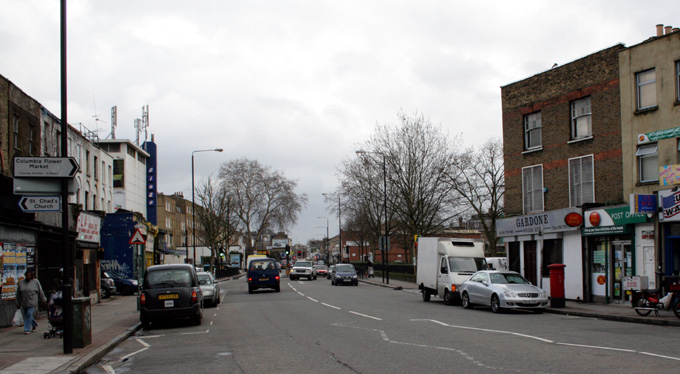
A view of Hackney Road, Bethnal Green (right) and Haggerston (left).

Hackney Road is a London arterial route running from Shoreditch Church in London Borough of Hackney to Cambridge Heath in the London Borough of Tower Hamlets. The route runs along the northern edge of Bethnal Green and southern edge of Haggerston. It lies close to the border between the boroughs of London Boroughs of Hackney and Tower Hamlets.

In recent years, Hackney Road has begun to experience the gentrification of nearby Columbia Road or Broadway Market. Hackney City Farm is located at the junction of (intersection with) Goldsmith's Row on the northern (Hackney) side of the road. Next to the farm is Haggerston Park.

In 2008 a 178-room Days Hotel London Shoreditch opened at the junction with Pritchard's Road. This has since become the Mama Shelter Shoreditch.

== Transport ==
Hackney Road is served by the London bus 26 and 55. Cambridge Heath station is situated at the east end of Hackney Road, at the junction with Cambridge Heath Road. The west end of Hackney Road is served by London Overground services from Hoxton railway station.

== July 2005 bombings ==
On 21 July 2005 at 13:30 BST a small explosion occurred on the Number 26 bus travelling from Waterloo to Hackney Wick, on the Haggerston side of Hackney Road at the corner with Columbia Road in Bethnal Green. There were no fatalities in the explosion.
