= Hackney City Farm =

City farm in Haggerston, London, England

Coordinates: 51.531731°N 0.06661°W

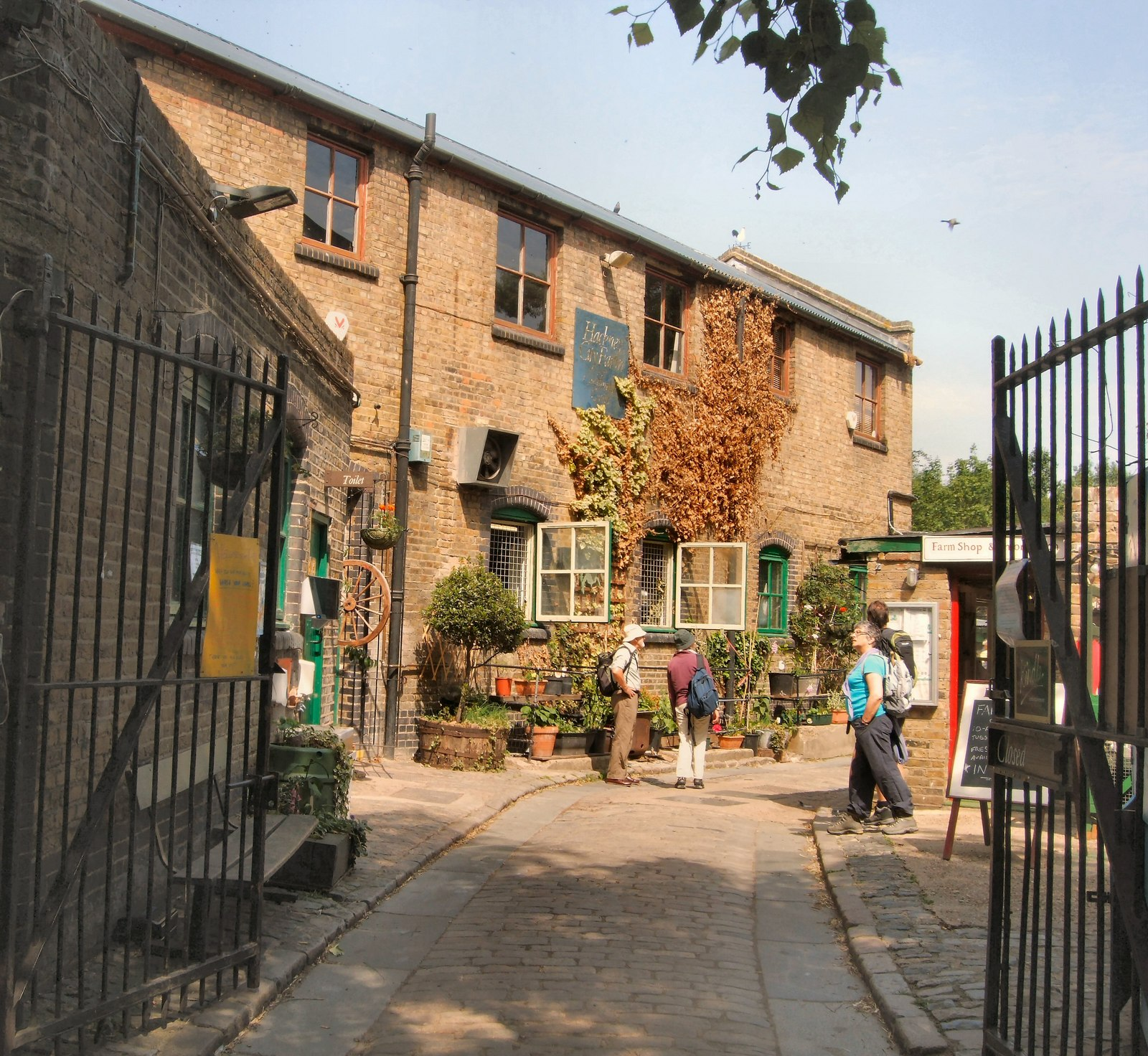
- Interactive map of Hackney City Farm
- Type: City farm
- Location: Haggerston Park, London
- Website: http://www.hackneycityfarm.co.uk/

Hackney City Farm is a city farm and private alternative school in Haggerston Park, located in the London Borough of Hackney. It is situated at the junction of Hackney Road and Goldsmith's Row.

== History ==
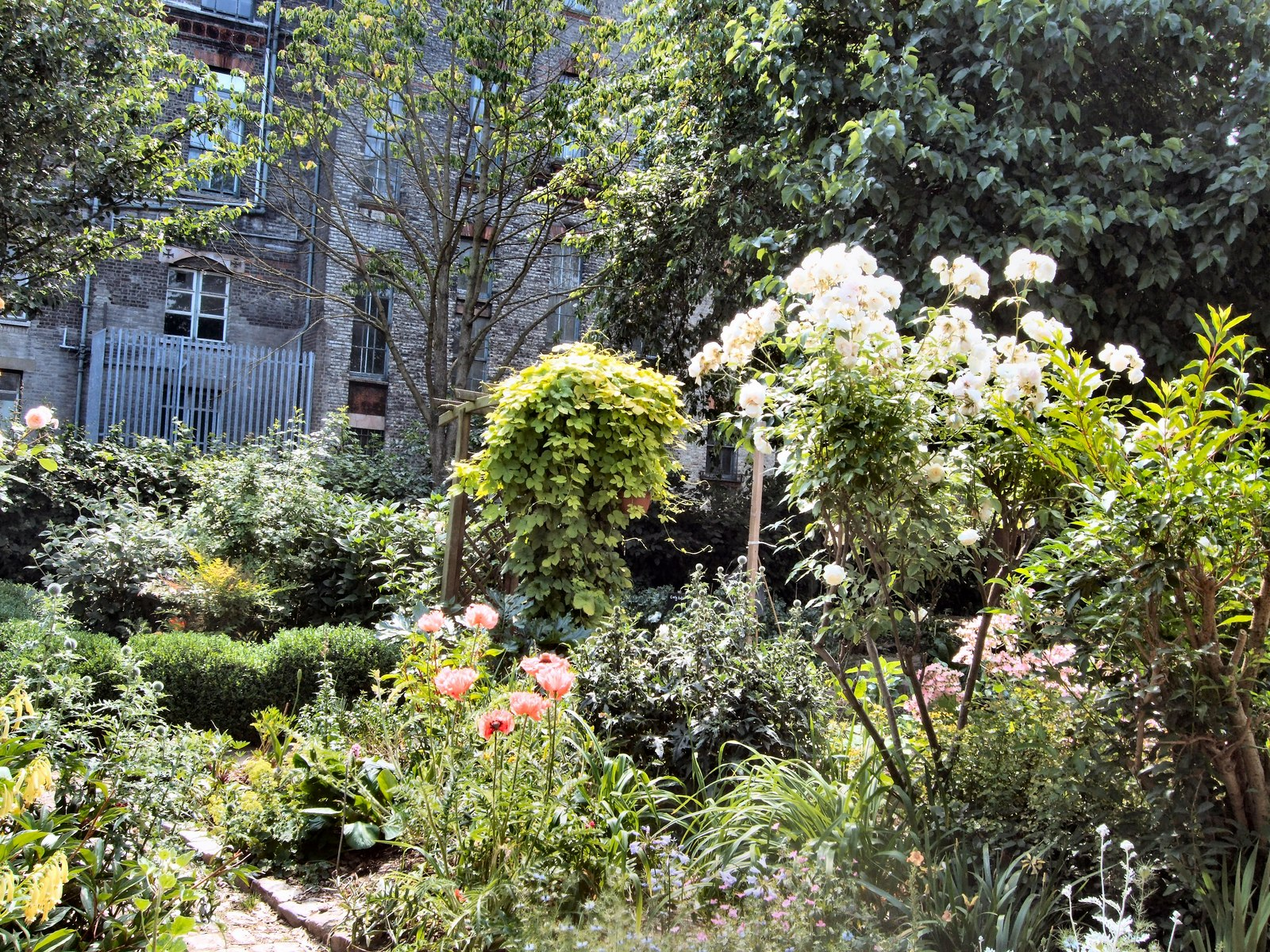
Hackney City Farm Gardens

The farm was established in 1984 as a community and educational resource and to give borough residents, particularly young people, experience of animals. The facilities at Hackney City Farm include a farmyard, area for grazing, garden and a tree nursery with butterfly house. The amenity encourages children to learn about the natural environment, growing vegetables and caring for animals. The farm is home to a range of animals, including poultry, sheep, rabbits, bees, pigs and a donkey. Animals can be adopted at the farm, and free range eggs are for sale.

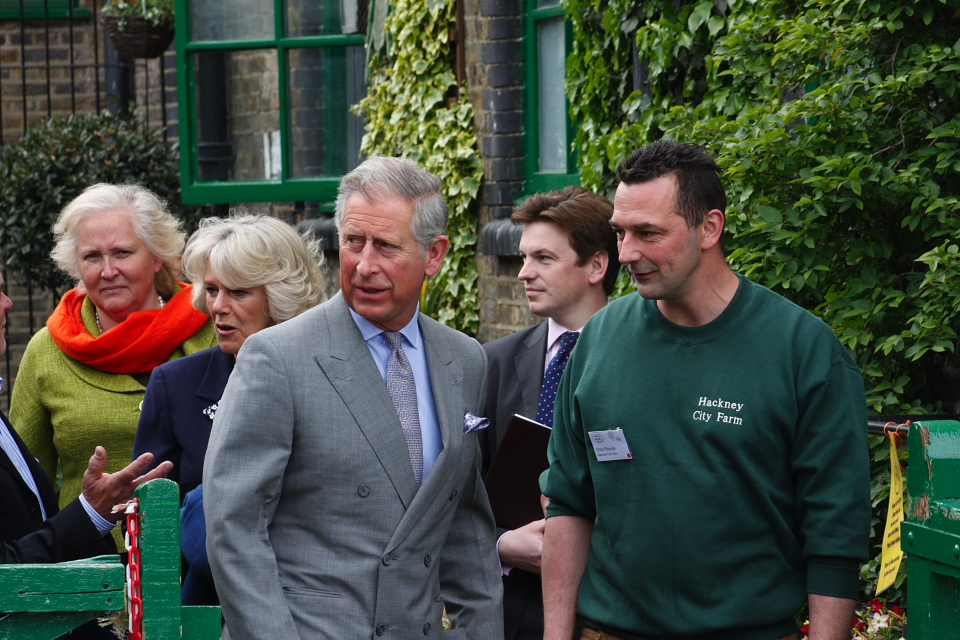
Visit by King Charles III (then the Prince of Wales), 2009

Hackney City Farm is a registered charity and a company limited by guarantee. It runs educational projects, exhibitions, courses in crafts and farm trails, and operates a café, Frizzante, which won a Time Out award for best family restaurant in 2004. In 2008, the cycling shop Bike Yard East opened in the farm, selling cycle products and offering repairs.

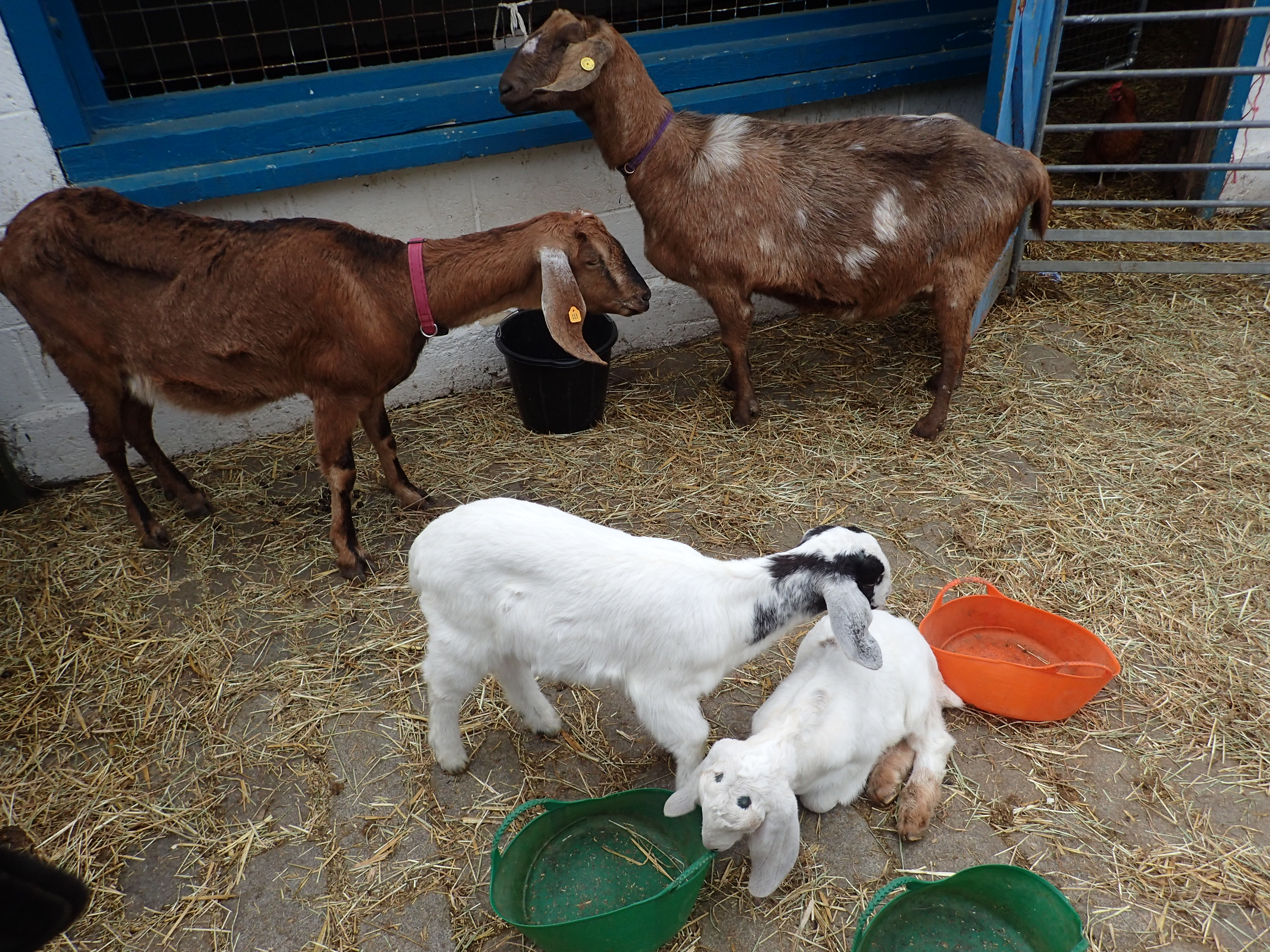
Goats at Hackney City Farm

In 2015 Hackney City Farm registered with Ofsted as a private alternative school. The farm has places for up to 10 pupils aged 13 to 17.
