= Sark Shags =

Excellent

- Emblem: Flag of Sark
- Union: Rugby Football Union
- Head coach: Alex Magell
- Captain: Jake Magell
- Most caps: Jonathan Bird (15)
- Top scorer: Benedict Willacy (102)
- Top try scorer: Tom "The Shovel" Driver (12)
- Home stadium: Sark Island Hall & Community Centre
First colours	Second colours

First international
- Guernsey

The Sark Shags represent Sark in rugby union. They compete annually in the Two Nations Championship against Guernsey.

The history of the team extends back to 2003 when the Sark Shags team played their first official Test match, beating Guernsey by one point. Sark dominated the early Island Nations Championship (now the Two Nations) which started in 2003. Sark did not win the Championship again until 2007.

== Name ==
The Sark Shags' name pays tribute to the bird native to the island, the Shag.

== Colours, home ground and sponsorship ==
Sark Shags players traditionally wear a white shirt showing the Flag of Sark, white shorts, and white socks.

Their home ground is Sark Sports Club Field where they first played in 2003. The team is administered by the Sark Island Council and is jointly managed by father and son pair, Alex and Jake Magell. Jake took up the rains in 2015 after his brother, Robbie Magell, left the island to play for St John's College (University of Queensland).

The official sponsor of the Sark Shags is the Stocks Hotel, Sark.

== History and team selection ==
The Sark Shags were formed by the Sark Island Council in 2003 as a way to develop relationships with other islands in the Bailiwick of Guernsey. As time has gone on Guernsey has become their main rival playing them in a match every August, however matches have also been played with islands such as Herm.

Team selection was previously strictly for citizens of the island, gradually the team has become an invitation XV where players must be known by citizens, or be citizens of Sark.

== See also ==
- Rugby union in the Bailiwick of Guernsey
