= Les Quennevais Rugby Club =

Les Quennevais R.F.C. was a rugby union club based in Jersey in the Channel Islands.

== The club ==
LQRFC were formed in 1980 from a highly successful team from Les Quennevais School, and has participated in rugby union in Jersey, Guernsey and in the English Hampshire competition and beyond continually since then. The club’s membership is drawn from all areas of the island community and membership ranges from 18 years old to over sixty. The club colors are navy blue, red and white.

The home ground was at Les Quennevais in St Brelade in the West of the island.

The club folded in 2016 due to lack of opponents following the collapse of the JRA League.

Hampshire Bowl winners 2003

== Competitions ==
LQRFC compete in the JRA League, a 7 team competition with 5 sides from Jersey and 2 in Guernsey played on a home and away basis. At the end of the season the top 4 league sides play-off for the Sugden Cup, whilst the remaining 3 challenge for the MacMillan Trophy. There is also the President’s Cup which is a separate knock out competition run during the season.

== Successes ==
The team has enjoyed considerable success since its inception, including the League title, the Sugden Cup, the President’s Cup, Numerous MacMillan and Cadet Trophies (now defunct). In 2003 LQRFC won the Hampshire Bowl. This represents the crowning glory of the club’s achievements. To put the magnitude of this success in to perspective the previous team name on the trophy was the Guernsey Rugby Club First XV.

== Club honours ==
- Hampshire Bowl winners: 2003

== See also ==
- Rugby union in Jersey
