= Rugby union in Jersey =

- Les Quennevais Rugby Club
- Country: Jersey
- Governing body: Rugby Football Union
- National team: Jersey
- First played: late 19th century
- Clubs: 8

Rugby union is a popular sport in Jersey.

== Governing body ==
Rugby union is played in Jersey under the auspices of the Jersey Rugby Association (JRA), which is affiliated to the Hampshire Rugby Football Union but is not a member of the Rugby Football Union of England. As such, it has no national team of its own, and is not affiliated to World Rugby in its own right. For this reason, it has no WR ranking.

== History ==
Due to its proximity to England and the major rugby nation of France, Jersey rugby is amongst the oldest in the world, dating back to the mid 19th century. Most schools play the sport, especially the private ones.

There are several rugby union clubs in the island including a rugby academy for under-18s that includes more than 600 players as of April 2012 and Les Quennevais Rugby Club.

Jersey Reds are a Jersey rugby club that enjoyed a meteoric rise through the English pyramid from 2005, when they were playing in London South West Division 3 (now known as London 2 South West), to 2012. They earned promotion at the end of that season, and then starting in 2007–08 earned four more in five seasons. The most recent promotion, at the end of the 2011–12 season, placed them in the second-tier RFU Championship, where they have played until the team folded in 2023.

The Siam Cup is an annual Rugby Union competition held between Jersey Reds and Guernsey RFC. It was first contested in 1920. The trophy awarded its winner is the second oldest rugby honour contested after the Calcutta Cup. Following the folding of Jersey Reds, they were replaced by the amateur side Jersey RFC in the annual competition.

Like many small islands, Jersey has a population problem. The main sport is football, and the national population is just over 90,000.

As yet, Jersey has not fielded a national team. In 2025 a combined Jersey and Guernsey rugby team, dubbed "Channel Islands XV" debuted in a friendly fixture against Sweden, ranked 31st in the world at the time.

== JRA League ==
The Jersey Rugby Association (JRA) League features the following teams:

- Beeches
- Guernsey RFC 2nd XV
- Jersey 3rd XV
- Jersey United Banks
- Les Quennevais
- St Jacques
- The Panthers

== Broadcast media ==
Jersey has no television of its own but does have its own radio station. However, British and French television can both be received on the island, and often include extensive rugby coverage - such as the Rugby World Cup and Six Nations Championship. The ITV variant Channel Television sometimes includes rugby news.

BBC Radio Jersey has live commentary of every Jersey Rugby Club home game as well as live inserts from every away game.

== Notable Jersey players ==
- Fraser Waters, born Cape Town, and has played for England, attended St. Michael's Preparatory School on Jersey.
- Matt Banahan
- Alison Christie was the first Jersey born player to represent one of the British Isles nations, Scotland, from 1994 to 2004. She has also represented the Classic Lionesses team twice, once in the 2003 Bermuda Classics and once in Murrayfield Stadium in 2007.
- Matthew Cook Jersey born Spanish international.
- Michael Le Bourgeois, the first Jersey born player to sign a professional contract with Jersey RFC.

== See also ==
- Rugby union in Guernsey
