= Staines RFC =

Staines Rugby Football Club
- Full name: Staines Rugby Football Club Limited
- Union: Middlesex RFU
- Nickname: Swans
- Founded: 1926
- Location: Hanworth, Hounslow, London, England
- Ground: The Reeves
- Chairman: (England) Stephen Leach
- President: Russell Cook
- League: Counties 4 Surrey

Official website
- www.stainesrugby.uk

Staines Rugby Football Club (Staines R.F.C.; trading as Staines Rugby Football Club Limited) is an English rugby union club founded in 1926, whose first team "The Swans" now play in Counties 4 Surrey. The club's home ground, The Reeves, in the London Borough of Hounslow, has five pitches and opened in 1964.

The club runs a number of senior men's and women's teams with names such as "the Swans" and "the Cobs". It was one of the first in the county to have Mini and Youth sections for children aged 4 to 17.

A notable former mini rugby player was British and Irish Lions Lawrence Dallaglio, who started his career at the age of eight.

== History ==
Staines R.F.C. was founded in 1926 William Davies, a local bank manager. Initially it played its home games at the Lammas Recreation Ground in Staines, but moved to a pitch at Laleham Cricket Ground in 1947. It acquired its current premises, a former gravel pit on Feltham Hill Road in Hanworth, West London, in 1962. The cost of the 14-acre (5.7 ha) ground, around £21,000, was primarily raised through loans. The ground was named "The Reeves" in honour of the club's then president, George Reeves, and was formally opened on 2 September 1964 with a match between Staines and a Middlesex XV.

In 1948, Staines R.F.C. was the first club in Middlesex to form a colts side for younger players. In 1961, a referees' society was formed and, in 1973, the club was the first in the county to introduce mini rugby. A new clubhouse was opened in September 1989.

== Club honours ==
- Middlesex 1 champions: 1991–92
- London 3 North West champions: 1993–94
- London 1 North champions (2): 1994–95, 2009–10
- Middlesex Senior Cup winners (7): 1996, 1997, 1998, 1999, 2009, 2010, 2011
- London 2 (north v south) promotion playoff winners: 2004–05
