= Middlesex RFU Senior Bowl =

English rugby union competition

- Sport: Rugby Union
- Instituted: 2003; 23 years ago
- Number of teams: 5
- Country: England
- Holders: Finchley (3rd title) (2017–18)
- Most titles: Finchley, Grasshoppers (3 titles)
- Website: Middlesex RFU

The Middlesex RFU Senior Bowl is an annual rugby union knock-out club competition organised by the Middlesex Rugby Football Union. It was first introduced during the 2003–04 season, with the inaugural winners being Hammersmith & Fulham. It is the second most important cup competition organised by the Middlesex RFU, behind the Senior Cup but ahead of the Senior Vase.

The Senior Bowl is currently open to the next top 16 club sides that are not eligible for the senior cup based in the historic county of Middlesex (2016–17 only saw 6 clubs take part), typically playing between tiers 6–9 of the English rugby union league system. The format is a knockout cup with a first round, semi-finals and a final to be held at one of the finalist's home ground between March–June (although final dates can vary drastically).

== Middlesex Senior Bowl winners ==
Middlesex Senior Bowl Finals
Season	Winner	Score	Runners–up	Venue
2003–04	Hammersmith & Fulham		Old Abbotstonians	
2004–05	Hammersmith & Fulham		Lockside	
2005–06	Old Actonians		Chiswick	
2006–07	Chiswick		Teddington	
2007–08	Chiswick	15–5	Teddington	
2008–09	Teddington	16–11	Old Priorians	Twyford Avenue Sports Ground, Acton, London
2009–10	Old Priorians	25–21	London Nigerian	Linford Christie Stadium, White City, London
2010–11	Twickenham	37–5	UCS Old Boys	Parkfields, Hampton, London
2011–12	Enfield Ignatians	31–13	HAC	Donkey Lane, Enfield, London
2012–13	Grasshoppers	44–27	HAC	McFarlane Lane, Osterley, London
2013–14	Grasshoppers	W/O (Note: Grasshoppers won the 2013–14 Middlesex Bowl final by walkover as their opponents were unable to raise a side.)		
2014–15	Grasshoppers	22–21	Old Actonians	Twyford Avenue Sports Ground, Acton, London
2015–16	Finchley	28–18	Epping Upper Clapton	Summers Lane, Finchley, London
2016–17	Finchley	44–10	Saracens Amateurs	Summers Lane, Finchley, London
2017–18	Finchley	47-29	Hendon	Summers Lane, Finchley, London
2018-19				

== Number of wins ==
- Finchley (3)
- Grasshoppers (3)
- Chiswick (2)
- Hammersmith & Fulham (2)
- Enfield Ignatians (1)
- Old Actonians (1)
- Old Priorians (1)
- Teddington (1)
- Twickenham (1)

== See also ==
- Middlesex RFU
- Middlesex Senior Cup
- Middlesex Senior Vase
- English rugby union system
- Rugby union in England
