= Rugby union in the Bailiwick of Guernsey =

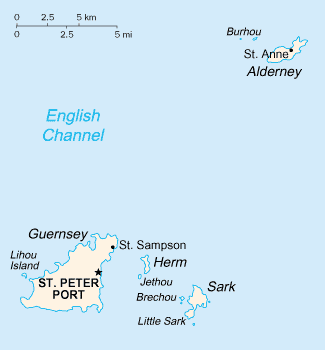
- Map of the Bailiwick of Guernsey
- Country: Guernsey
- Governing body: Rugby Football Union
- National team: Guernsey
- First played: late 19th century
- Clubs: Guernsey RFC; St Jacques RFC

Rugby union in the Bailiwick of Guernsey is a popular sport. Outside the island of Guernsey itself, it is occasionally played in Alderney and Sark. Sark has its own rugby team, although it regularly has to pick up "guest" players to make up its numbers.

== Governing body ==
Rugby is played in Guernsey under the auspices of the (English) Rugby Football Union.

== History ==
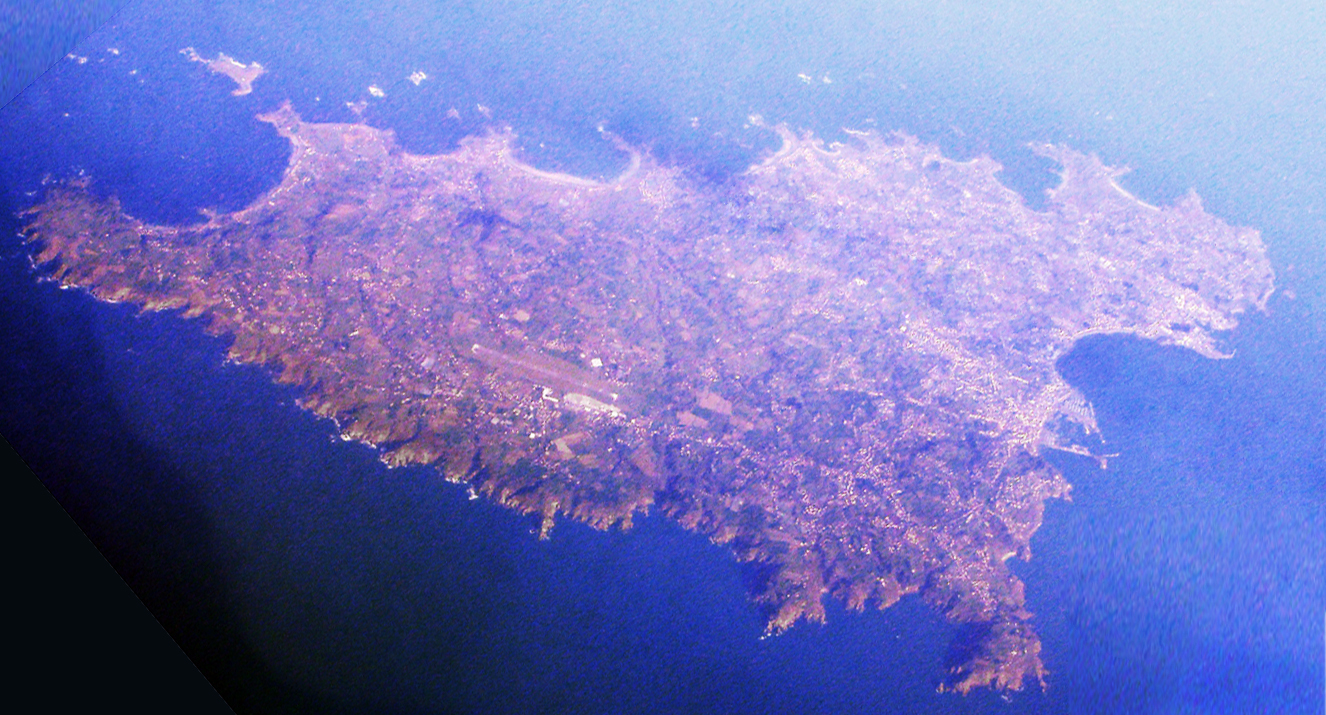
An aerial view of Guernsey, from 33,000 feet.

Due to its proximity to the major rugby nations England and France, Guernsey rugby is among the oldest in the world, dating back to the mid 19th century. A number of schools play the sport, especially the private ones, such as Elizabeth College.

Guernsey RFC was founded in 1928 and competes in the English leagues. There is only one other club in Guernsey, St Jacques Vikings, which was founded in 1978. During the 2025/26 season St Jacques are competing in Counties 1 Hampshire. The Vikings’ home ground is Footes Lane, which is also shared with Guernsey RFC (Raiders) who play in National 2 East (Level 4). The current head coach (2025) is Layton Batiste, with Dan Brown and Dave McGall as assistant coaches. St Jacques have a growing squad of around 40 players, with many being recent graduates of the Guernsey Rugby Academy.

The Siam Cup is an annual Rugby Union competition held between Jersey Reds and Guernsey RFC. It was first contested in 1920. The trophy awarded its winner is the second oldest rugby honour contested after the Calcutta Cup.

Development of the sport is limited due to the practicalities of small islands; Guernsey's national population is under 70,000

As yet, Guernsey has not fielded a national team. In 2025 a combined Jersey and Guernsey rugby team, dubbed "Channel Islands XV" debuted in a friendly fixture against Sweden, ranked 31st in the world at the time.

== Broadcast media ==
Guernsey has no television of its own (the ITV variant Channel Television sometimes includes rugby news) but does have its own radio stations. British and French television can both be received in the islands, and often include extensive rugby coverage – such as the Rugby World Cup and Six Nations Championship.

== See also ==
- Rugby union in Jersey
