= Rugby union in the British Virgin Islands =

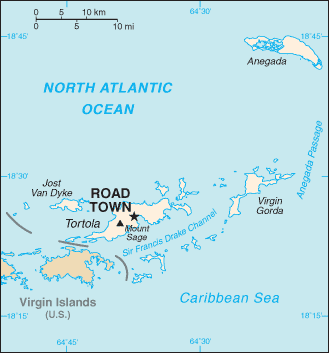
Map of British Virgin Islands

Rugby union in the British Virgin Islands is a minor but growing sport. They currently have around 440 registered players.

== Governing body ==
The governing body is BVI Rugby Football Union, which is affiliated to the IRB and the North America Caribbean Rugby Association.

== History ==
The British first introduced the game to the islands, and for a number of years it was mainly played by expatriates. Now it has some uptake by the local population.

Games against visiting ships, and touring sides are common, as well as against neighbouring Caribbean islands.

The British Virgin Islands compete in the Caribbean Championship, a tournament which includes Trinidad and Tobago, Bermuda, Martinique, the Cayman Islands, Jamaica, the Bahamas, Antigua and Guyana.

== See also ==
- British Virgin Islands national rugby union team
