= Old Streetonians RFC =

Amateur rugby club in Hackney, East London, England

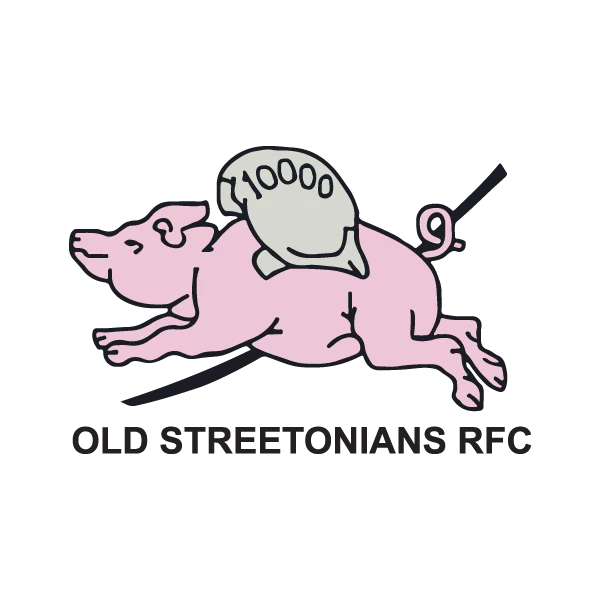
- Full name: Old Streetonians RFC
- Union: Middlesex RFU
- Nickname(s): Old Street, Onions
- Founded: 1989
- Location: Hackney Marshes (home matches) Haggerston Park (training)
- Ground: Hackney Marshes
- President: Dicky Stringer
- Captain(s): 1XV - Elliot Handler; 2XV - Richard Borlin; 3XV - Alex Paull
- League: 1XV - Middlesex Counties 1

Official website
- oldstreetrugby.com

Old Streetonians RFC (also known as Old Street Rugby) is an amateur rugby union club based in Hackney, East London, England. Founded in 1989 in Shoreditch, the club fields three senior men's sides competing within the Rugby Football Union (RFU) league pyramid.

== History ==
Old Streetonians RFC was established in 1989 in the Shoreditch area of Central East London. The club takes its name from Old Street, the arterial road running through the area that would later become known as Silicon Roundabout. Over the following decades the club grew to field multiple sides, drawing players from across East and Central London.

The club began as friends who drank in the Bricklayers Arms decided to play a cricket match. They thoroughly enjoyed it but the summer of 1989 was over so they had to choose something else to spend their time. They couldn't decide between rugby or setting up an amateur dramatics society so they tossed a coin - which landed on rugby.

The club played a famous draw against London Welsh RFC in October 2018, drawing 0-0 which drew press attention from across the globe.

== Denise Vinyl Cup ==
Old Streetonians' annual inter-club Christmas match and Awards ceremony. Named after Denise who worked behind the bar at The Bricklayers Arms in Shoreditch and always wore a vinyl dress.

== Playing and training ==
The club trains at the Haggerston Park 4G artificial pitches in Hackney (postcode E2 8NS) on Tuesday evenings from 19:00 to 21:00. Home fixtures are played at Hackney Marshes (E9 5PF) on Saturdays.

== Membership ==
The club is open to players of all abilities, from those with no prior rugby experience to those with a background in club rugby. Prospective members are encouraged to attend a Tuesday training session before formally joining.

The club does not currently operate a women's section. Women seeking to play in east London are directed towards Hackney Gladies RFC and East London Vixens RFC.

== Cricket ==
The Club originated from a cricket match, as mentioned above, and continues to play as Old Streetonians Rugby Football Club Cricket Club (OSORFCC) in the Hackney league of Last Man Stands.

== People of Note Connected to the Club ==
=== Lynn and Richard Hay ===
Married couple Lynn and Richard Hay have been part of Old Streetonians since it started in a pub in Shoreditch. The pair have worked to ensure the club is run effectively and sustainably to allow men to play rugby in London.

Lynn Hay was recognised for her work for the club in the King's Birthday Honours in June 2026, receiving a Medal of the Order of the British Empire (BEM) for their contributions to the sport.

=== Kat Merchant ===
Two time World Cup winner with England, Merchant has coached Old Streetonians.

=== Richard Hadfield ===
Winner of Britain's Got Talent with Collabro in 2014, Hadfield has played front and back row for Old Streetonians and sung the national anthem before England vs. Wales in the 2022 Six Nations.

=== Others of Note ===
- David Bailey - not that one
- Heroin George - the club's first try scorer
- Mao Ning - feng shui expert who suggested turning the pitch 90 degrees to improve a poor run of form
- Nick Obileye - first human on earth
- Sebastian von Teichmeister - appeared on Junior Masterchef

== See also ==
- Middlesex RFU
- England Rugby
- How at the Moon, Hoxton
