= CS Rugby 1863 =

English rugby union club, based in London

CS Stags 1863
- Full name: Civil Service Stags 1863
- Union: Middlesex RFU
- Nickname: The Stags
- Founded: 1863; 163 years ago
- Location: Chiswick, Hounslow, London, England
- Ground: King's House Sports Ground
- Chairman: Fred Cracknell
- President: Mike Lee
- Director of Rugby: Chris Swann
- Coach: Oliver Bryant
- League: Regional 1 South Central
- 2025–26: 5th
Team kit

Official website
- www.pitchero.com/clubs/civilservicefootballclubru/

Civil Service Rugby, also known as CS Rugby 1863, currently CS STAGS 1863, is an English rugby union team based in Chiswick, Greater London. The club runs three senior sides and the first XV currently play in Regional 1 South Central following their promotion from London 1 South as champions at the end of the 2017–18 season.

== History ==
In 1863, the newly formed Civil Service F.C. club was playing "football" under both association and rugby rules and sources suggest that the club was similar to Clapham Rovers in that it was a single club playing both codes. At what point the Civil Service Rugby Club became a distinct entity from the association football is unclear. Certainly, the histories published by the official Football and Rugby clubs respectively do not refer to a joint history past even 1863. However, the club was still a unified entity when it became a founding member of the Rugby Football Union in 1871, although notably it did not provide a member to the inaugural committee. However, in 1892 contemporary sources refer to Clapham Rovers as being unique in the respect that it played both codes, suggesting that the Civil Service had distinct teams by that point. CS Rugby 1863 was formed in 1863 and in eight years the club became one of the founder members of the Rugby Football Union. In 1879, the club became a founder member of Surrey RFU but has been a member of the Middlesex RFU since the 1880s.

== Honours ==
- Herts/Middlesex 2 champions: 2000–01
- Herts/Middlesex 1 champions: 2001–02
- London Division 4 North West champions: 2002–03
- London Division 3 North West champions: 2003–04
- London Division 2 North champions: 2006–07
- Middlesex Senior Cup winners (4): 2008, 2015, 2017, 2018
- London 1 (north v south) promotion play-off winners: 2009–10
- London 1 South champions: 2017–18
