= Hanworth =

District of west London, England

Coordinates: 51.431°N 0.381°W

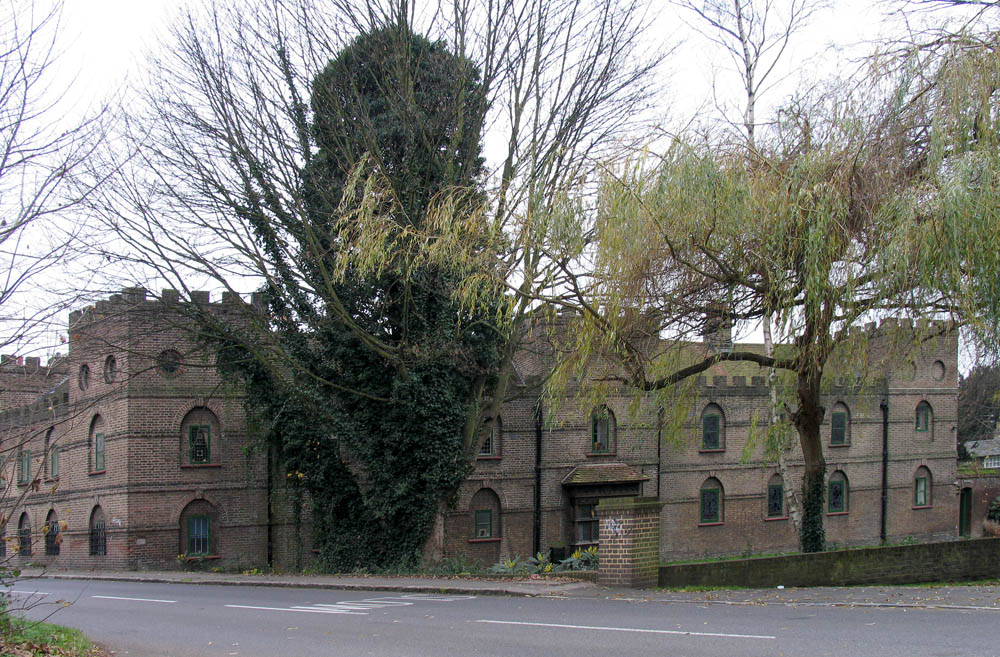
- Tudor House in Castle Way, Hanworth.

- Location within Greater London
- Area: 6.89 km^{2} (2.66 sq mi)
- Population: 23,563 (Hanworth, Hanworth Park wards 2011)
  - Density: 3,420/km^{2} (8,900/sq mi)
- OS grid reference: TQ3682
- London borough: Hounslow
- Ceremonial county: Greater London
- Region: London
- Country: England
- Sovereign state: United Kingdom
- Post town: HOUNSLOW
- Postcode district: TW4
- Post town: FELTHAM
- Postcode district: TW13
- Dialling code: 020
- Police: Metropolitan
- Fire: London
- Ambulance: London
- UK Parliament: Feltham and Heston
- London Assembly: South West

Hanworth is a district of West London, England. Historically in Middlesex, it has been part of the London Borough of Hounslow since 1965. Hanworth adjoins Feltham to the northwest, Twickenham to the northeast and Hampton to the southeast, with Sunbury-on-Thames to the southwest.

The name is thought to come from the Anglo-Saxon words haen/han and worth, meaning "small homestead".

== History ==
During Edward the Confessor’s time, Hanworth was a sparsely populated manor and parish held by Ulf, a "huscarl" of the King. Huscarls were the bodyguards of Scandinavian Kings and were often the only professional soldiers in the Kingdom. The majority of huscarls in the kingdom were killed at Hastings in 1066, and William the Conqueror granted Hanworth to Robert under Roger de Montgomery, the Earl of Arundel and Shrewsbury. After his death, his second son held the land until his death in the Mowbray conspiracy of 1098, after which it passed to his eldest son, Robert de Bellesme, who also rebelled against the Crown in 1102 with the result that the lands were confiscated.

Towards the end of the 14th century, the manor was occupied by Sir Nicholas Brembre, who was Mayor of London in 1377 and 1378. Sir Nicholas was hanged at Tyburn in 1387, having been accused of treason.

Assurance of Manor of Hanworth Act 1514
- Act of Parliament
- Parliament of England
- Long title: Thassurance of the titles of the Kinges Manour of Hanworth.
- Citation: 6 Hen. 8. c. 23 (Note: This is the citation in The Statutes of the Realm.); 6 Hen. 8. c. 5 Pr. (Note: This is the citation in The Statutes at Large.)
- Territorial extent: England and Wales

Dates
- Royal assent: 31 March 1515
- Commencement: 5 February 1515 (Note: Start of session.)
- Repealed: 31 July 1978
Other legislation
Repealed by	Statute Law (Repeals) Act 1978

Status: Repealed

Text of statute as originally enacted

In 1512, Hanworth came to the Crown, and Henry VIII, who enjoyed hunting on the heath surrounding the village, gave the manor to Anne Boleyn for life. After her execution, the manor returned to the King who held it until his death in 1547 but passing to Katherine Parr, who lived in the house with her stepdaughter Princess Elizabeth. When the princess became Queen, she stayed at Hanworth Manor several times, often hunting on the heath.

In June 1544, when her sister Anne Parr had a baby, Queen Katherine Parr offered her sister the use of her own manor at Hanworth for the childbirth. The Queen frequently dispatched messengers to Hanworth to check on her sister's well-being and arranged for a sisable group from her household to attend the baby's christening. By July, there were still exchanges of messages between the Queen in London and her sister at Hanworth. Shortly thereafter, Anne made the short journey to the Hertfords' new residence, Syon House, to visit Anne Stanhope, Countess of Hertford, and her newborn.

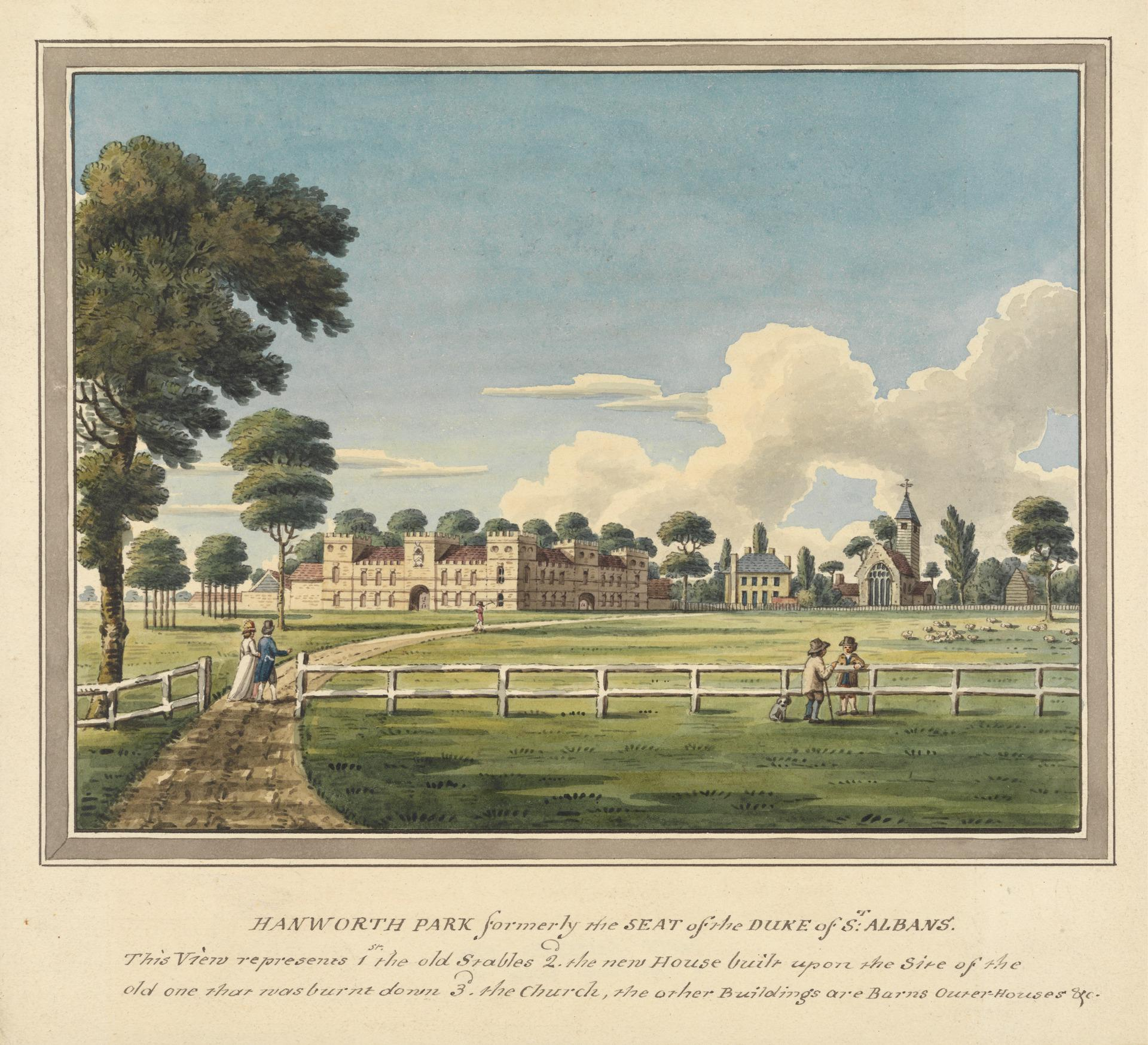
Undated painting of Hanworth Park by Charles Tomkins (1757-1823).

In 1784, General Sir William Roy, the military draughtsman, supervised the Principal Triangulation of Great Britain project. That measured a base line from King's Arbour, across Hounslow Heath passing through Hanworth Park, to Hampton Poor House. This measurement, which earned the General the Copley medal of the Royal Society, was the origin of all subsequent surveys of the United Kingdom, and still forms the basis of the Ordnance Survey maps today.

In 1797, the manor house was destroyed by fire, leaving only the stable block, which survives today as flats, and the coach house, which was converted into homes. c. 1799 a new house was built on the same site known as Hanworth House. In 1827 the house and estate of c. 680 acres (known as Hanworth Great Park), including three farms was sold outright to Henry Perkins. During the 1830s the current building known as Hanworth Park House was built. This building is currently sitting derelict in the middle of Hanworth Park. A local campaign is running to restore the house.

By the end of the 19th century, William Whiteley, of Whiteleys in Bayswater, had bought 200 acres (0.81 km^{2}) of farmland that had previously been Butts and Glebe farms. Renamed Hanworth Farms, these supplied all the produce for the store's food hall having been transported daily by horse and cart. Following Whiteley's murder by his illegitimate son in 1907, his legitimate sons sold the farm to a jam manufacturer who operated there until selling the land for new homes in 1933.

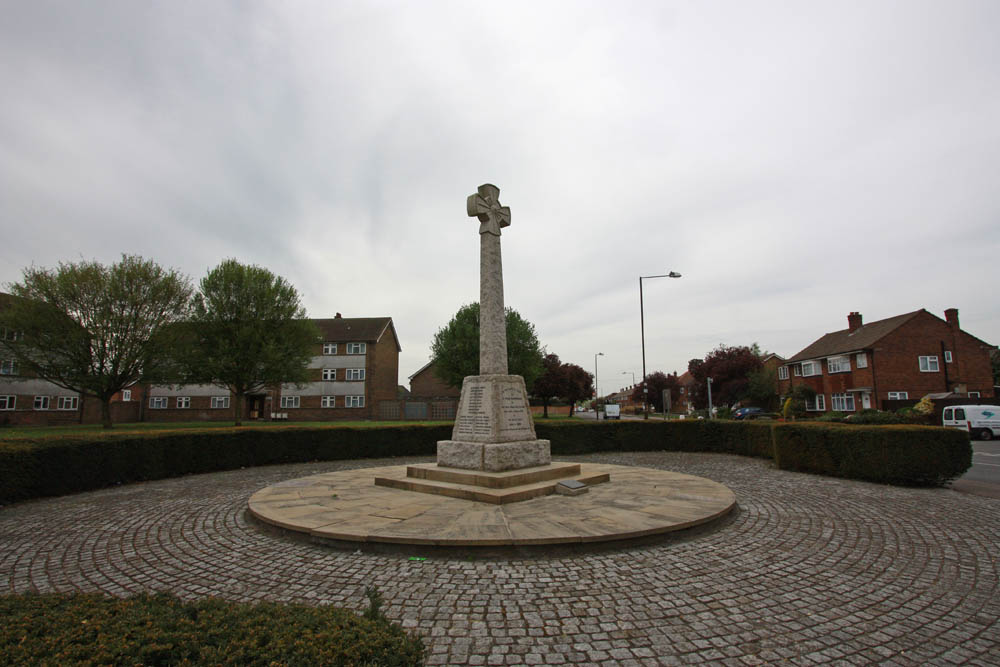
Hanworth War Memorial

On 1 April 1965 the civil parish was abolished. At the 1951 census (one of the last before the abolition of the parish), Hanworth had a population of 12,213.

=== Manors ===
The Ambassador to Charles I, negotiating the secret treaty of 1631 with Spain, who had good knowledge of the country, was raised to the peerage as Baron Cottington of Hanworth, referring to his Hanworth Park estate, receiving the honour 'at Greenwich in a very solemn manner.' As the Civil War drew near he declared himself an active Royalist, and after hostilities had broken out he joined the king at Oxford. He was excepted by Parliament from 'indemnity and composition', and spent the remainder of his life abroad, dying in Spain in 1652. His estates were assigned in 1649 to John Bradshaw who had earlier insisted on Charles's execution and were recovered at the English Restoration by his nephew and heir Charles Cottington who sold it in 1670 to Sir Thomas Chamber.

Chamber died in 1692, and was succeeded by his son Thomas. Thomas Chamber left two daughters and co-heiresses, and Hanworth passed, through agreement on marriage of the elder, to Vere Beauclerk, who was created Baron Vere, of Hanworth in 1750. The manor was inherited by his son and heir, Aubrey, in 1781, who succeeded his cousin as Duke of St. Albans six years later but who sold it shortly after 1802 to James Ramsey Cuthbert. Frederick John Cuthbert was lord of the manor in 1816 from whom it passed to Henry Perkins. After the death of his heir Algernon Perkins it passed to a firm of solicitors, and the main home was acquired in the early part of the next century by Court of Appeal judge turned politician Ernest Murray Pollock, 1st Viscount Hanworth.

=== Churches ===
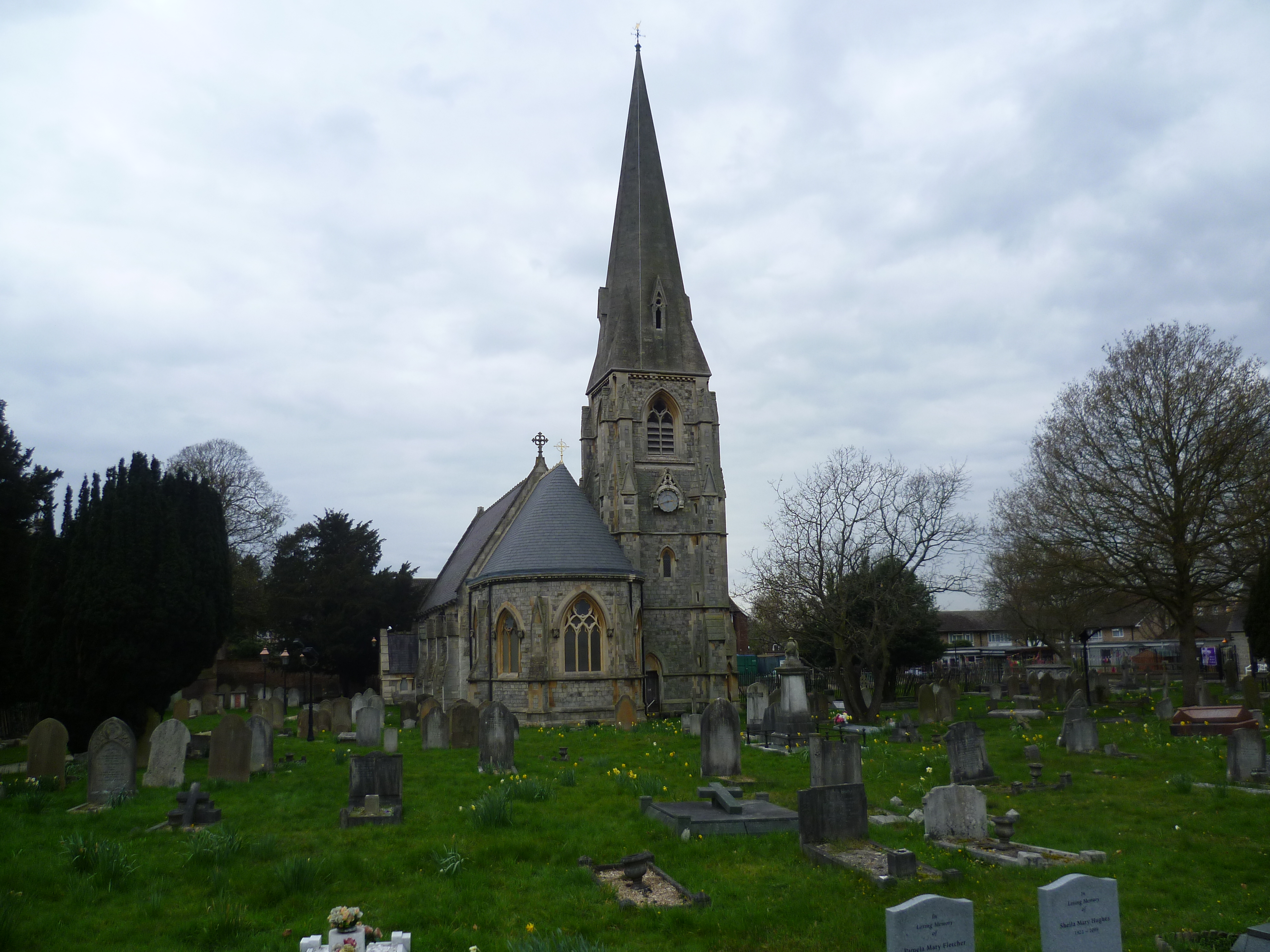
St. George's Church

==== Saint George's Church ====
Hanworth's main parish church is dedicated to Saint George. There has been a church on the site, in Castle Way, since at least the fourteenth century; the church was first mentioned in 1293. The first known rector was Adam de Brome, founder of Oriel College, Oxford, in 1309.

==== All Saints' Church ====
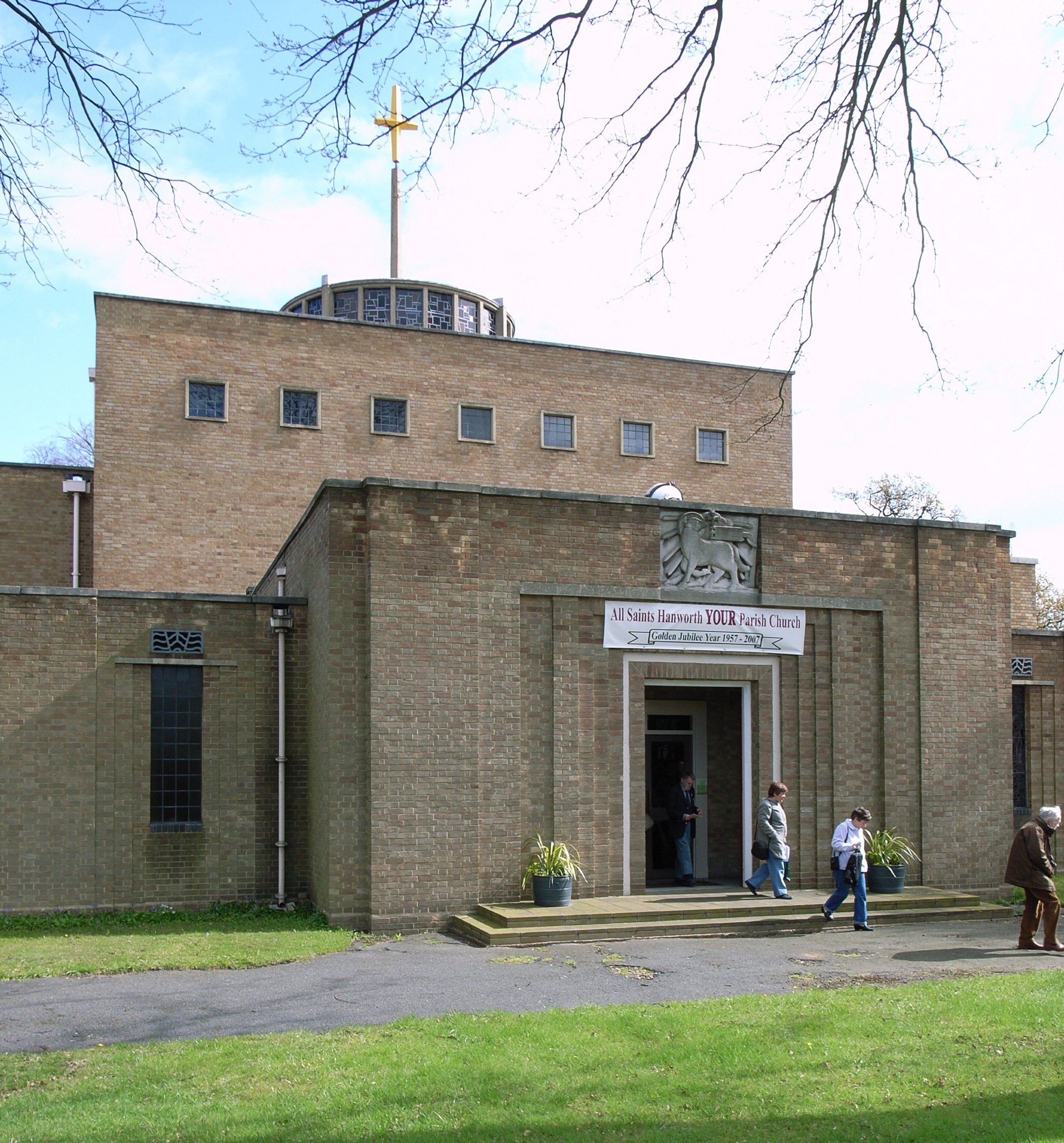
All Saints' Church

In 1935, Hanworth had a jam factory belonging to Whiteley's. It was decided that a chapel of ease should be set up. It was founded by Bertram Pollock, Bishop of Norwich, and the Rector of Saint George's. Bishop Pollock had been born at Woodlawn, a house in Hanworth, near Hampton Road West, and part of it was used as the chapel.

After the Second World War, in 1947, it was originally decided that a Nissen hut should be used to house the chapel. However, when the architect Nugent Cachemaille-Day was approached, he decided that a proper church should be built, and a site on the opposite side of Hampton Road West was chosen.

The Parish of All Saints was split off from Saint George's in 1950, and the foundation stone of the new church was laid on 14 July 1951 by the Bishop of Guildford, Henry Montgomery Campbell, in the presence of Lord Latham, Lord-Lieutenant of Middlesex. The church was finally consecrated on 28 September 1957 by Campbell, who by then was Bishop of London.

The church now also offers an "International Service" in Ukrainian.

==== St. Richard's Church ====
Hanworth's third church, St. Richard's, was built in 1965 and is located at the end of Forge Lane, near the village boundary with Hampton. It is currently fundraising to completely renovate \ refurbish the church.

=== Hanworth Aerodrome ===
Hanworth Aerodrome was a grass airfield, operational from 1917 to 1919 and 1929 to 1947. It was located in Hanworth Park, and included the grounds of Hanworth Park House, an 1802 rebuild of Hanworth Palace, but currently empty and disused. It was used as a clubhouse in the 1930s, and more recently as an old people's home. In the 1930s, named London Air Park, it was best known as a centre for private flying, society events, aircraft manufactured by General Aircraft Limited (GAL) 1934–1949, and the visit by the Graf Zeppelin airship in 1932. Amelia Earhart flew to Hanworth after landing in Ireland at the end of her 1932 crossing of the Atlantic; Walter Sickert recorded Miss Earhart's Arrival in a painting now owned by the Tate Gallery. There is a public house nearby named "The Airman" in recognition of its close proximity to the aerodrome, and a large aircraft propeller sculpture marks the site of the General Aircraft factory. Feltham District Council purchased the park in 1956. Feltham Swimming Baths was built on parkland beside the Uxbridge Road in 1965, later refurbished and renamed Feltham Airparcs Leisure Centre. That public sports facility was renamed in 2010 as Hanworth Air Park Leisure Centre & Library

=== 1970s ===
The construction of an elevated M3 feeder road (now part of the A316) in the 1970s cut Hanworth in two; in preparation for this, the library was relocated to Mount Corner, so-named for being opposite the Hanworth Park House icehouse mound. Forge Lane Infants and Junior School was built on the south side of the new road, and the war memorial was relocated.

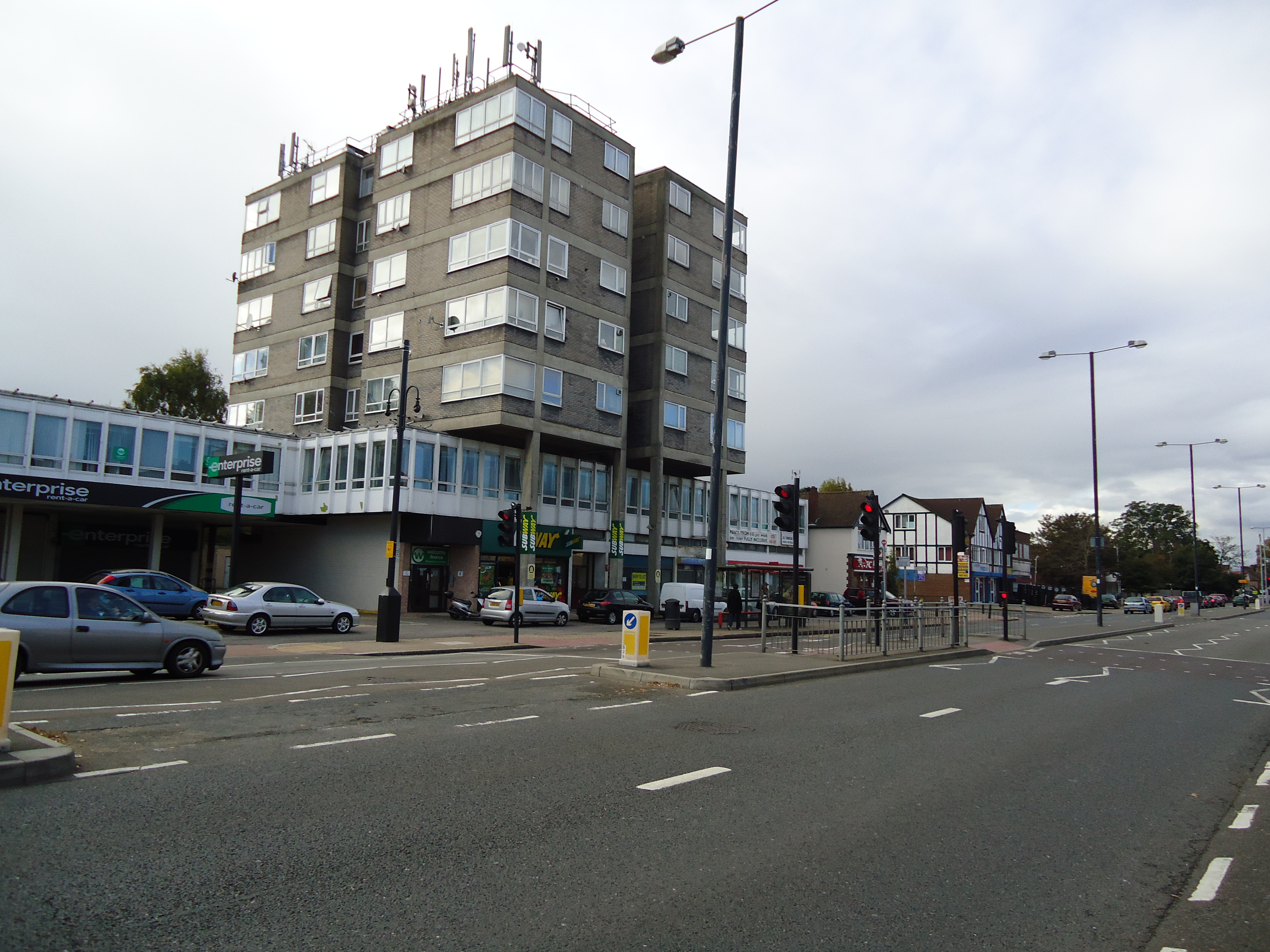
Rex House and shops on Hampton Road West.

== Sport and leisure ==
Hanworth has two Non-League football clubs, Hanworth Villa F.C. who play at Rectory Meadow and play in the Isthmian league and Feltham FC who play at Feltham Rugby Club and play in the Middlesex County Football League.

Hanworth Air Park is the home of Feltham Rugby Football Club, founded 1947; and a reincarnation of Feltham Football Club, originally founded 1946.

Hanworth Airpark is also the home of Hanworth Sports FC, since 2002.

Hanworth Air Park Leisure Centre & Library (formerly Feltham Airparcs), also in Hanworth Air Park, has a gym and a swimming pool.

Staines Rugby Football Club The Reeves play home games and train at a rugby ground in Snakey Lane.

== Geography ==
=== Soil, watercourses and elevation ===
Soil in Hanworth varies between gravel close to the surface and a clay-rich loam, with very narrow belts of alluvium closest to the streams. The land is relatively flat and drained by two watercourses heading southward and eastward respectively to meet the Thames in neighbouring historic parishes, the River Crane marking much of the northern border with Twickenham, and the Port Lane stream matching approximately the western boundary. Elevations range from 11m to 16m OD.

== Transport ==
The nearest railway stations serving the area are: Feltham railway station, Hampton and Kempton Park. Feltham railway station is on the northern edge of the district, situated on the boundary between Feltham and Hanworth in the Hanworth Park ward.

There are no underground ('tube') stations serving the area, but the nearest ones are Hounslow East (to the north) and Hatton Cross (to the west); both stations are on the Heathrow branch of the Piccadilly line.

London bus routes serving Hanworth are: the 111, 285, 290, 490, H25 and R70.

== Notable people ==
- Henry Killigrew (1613–1700), playwright and chaplain to James, Duke of York (the future king), was born in Hanworth.
- Edward Seymour, 1st Earl of Hertford (1539–1621) was in 1563 removed to Hanworth from the Tower of London, where he had been imprisoned on account of his marriage with Lady Katherine Grey.
- The Viscounts Hanworth, particularly the 1st Viscount, a former Court of Appeal judge, who established his family seat at Hanworth Park until his estate parted with it as liable to considerable inheritance tax.
- Bertram Pollock (1863–1943), Bishop of Norwich, was born in Hanworth.
- Elizabeth I, who lived there in the 1540s in the household of her stepmother, Katherine Parr, the sixth wife of Henry VIII, and Katherine's fourth husband, Thomas Seymour.
- Anne Parr, who gave birth to her second son, Edward, at Hanworth manor
- David Copeland was a mass murderer who lived here for a while.

== Demography and housing ==
2011 Census Homes
Ward	Detached	Semi-detached	Terraced	Flats and apartments	Caravans/temporary/mobile homes/houseboats	Shared between households
Hanworth	175	1,347	1,370	1,748	4	7
Hanworth Park	309	1,534	1,146	1,479	8	9

2011 Census Households
Ward	Population	Households	% Owned outright	% Owned with a loan	hectares
Hanworth	12,155	4,651	18	29	325
Hanworth Park	11,408	4,485	25	36	364

The 2011 ethnic groups of Hanworth were:

- 58.5% White British
- 9% Other White (Not covering Irish/Gypsy)
- 17.9% Asian
- 6.9% Black

== See also ==
Media related to Hanworth at Wikimedia Commons

== Bibliography ==
- Cameron, Andrea (2002). Feltham, Bedfont and Hanworth. Phillimore. ISBN 1-86077-209-9.
- Hanworth Air Park 1916-1949. Feltham Arts Association. 1997.
- Sherwood, Philip (1999). Heathrow: 2000 Years of History. The History Press. ISBN 978-0750950862.
- Sherwood, Tim (1999). Coming in to Land: A Short History of Hounslow, Hanworth and Heston Aerodromes 1911-1946. Heritage Publications (Hounslow Library). ISBN 1899144307.
- Wright, John E.B.C.; Finnis, John H.B. A Book of Hanworth. Tucann Design & Print. ASIN BX61156571.
- Wright, John E.B.C.; Finnis, John H.B. Hanworth 2. Tucann Design & Print.
