= Haggerston Park =

Park in the London Borough of Hackney

Coordinates: 51°31′59″N 0°4′3″W

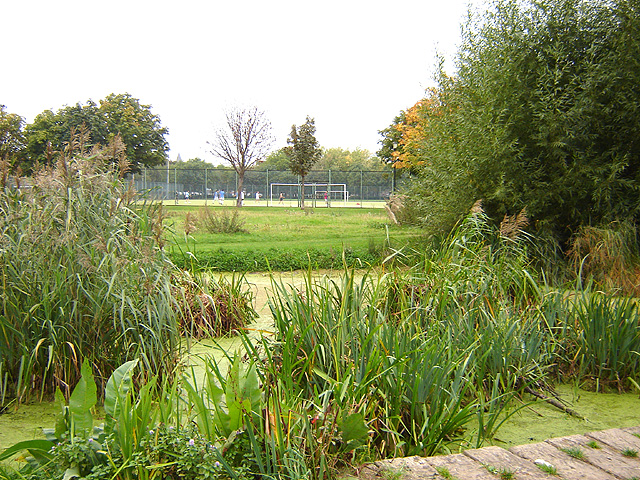
Haggerston Park looking west from the nature reserve. (October 2005)

Haggerston Park is an open space in Haggerston, in the London Borough of Hackney. It is bounded by Whiston Road (to the north), Hackney Road (south) and St Saviour's Priory, Queensbridge Road (west) and Goldsmith's Row (east).

The park was originally created in the 1950s and extended in the 1980s. It was carved out of an area of derelict housing, a tile manufacturer, and the former Shoreditch Gasworks, which had been hit by a V-2 rocket in 1944 and badly damaged. Today, it occupies 6 hectares (15 acres)

Haggerston Park contains a small but luxuriant nature reserve and a number of football pitches. The park, one of the few formal landscaped gardens in Hackney, was laid out in 1956. Also dating from the 1950s is a long arcade walk on the north side of the park with a mature wisteria. In the 1980s the park was extended to the south to include a Hackney City Farm, on the site of a former brewery, a children's playground and playing fields.

At first, Hackney Council buildings in Haggerston Park attracted little opposition - most locals approved of a new SureStart building on the West side of the park. The long-term lease handed to Bridge Academy for the Astroturf was highly unpopular, and in 2007 the Council built a temporary school in parkland known as the Audrey Street Depot. A planning application was prepared and submitted, including a Section 106 commitment to return it to parkland a year later.

The Park is within a Conservation Area, and part of the park including the Audrey St Depot is listed as a Site of Importance for Nature Conservation (SINC), a designation used by local authorities in the United Kingdom for sites of substantive local natural value.

The planning sub-committee approved the application but then the application was withdrawn and the Section 106 was therefore never enforced. For the following 7 years the council claimed it did not have the funds to make good on the return to parkland, and then in February 2016 it announced it was building a much larger Academy school in the same spot. The new City of London Academy is also "temporary" - for five years, and the Mayor has promised the land will be returned to parkland at the end of the period. But the signs are not good. The City of London Academy is breaching Conditions of the planning permission, despite repeated reminders from locals.

On 29 July 1992, Michael Jackson landed at Haggerston Park in a helicopter with Mickey Mouse and Minnie Mouse where he visited the children at the nearby then children's hospital Queen Elizabeth Hospital for Children. The hospital has since been redeveloped into luxury flats, throwing further pressure on the park.

Haggerston Park received a Green Flag award in July 2008.
