= Paragon China =

British manufacturer of bone china

Paragon China Company Limited
- Type: Private company
- Industry: Pottery
- Predecessor: Star China Company
- Founded: 1897
- Founder: Herbert Aynsley & Hugh Irving
- Defunct: 1960s
- Fate: Acquired by Royal Doulton
- Headquarters: Longton, Stoke-on-Trent, England
- Products: Teaware & tableware

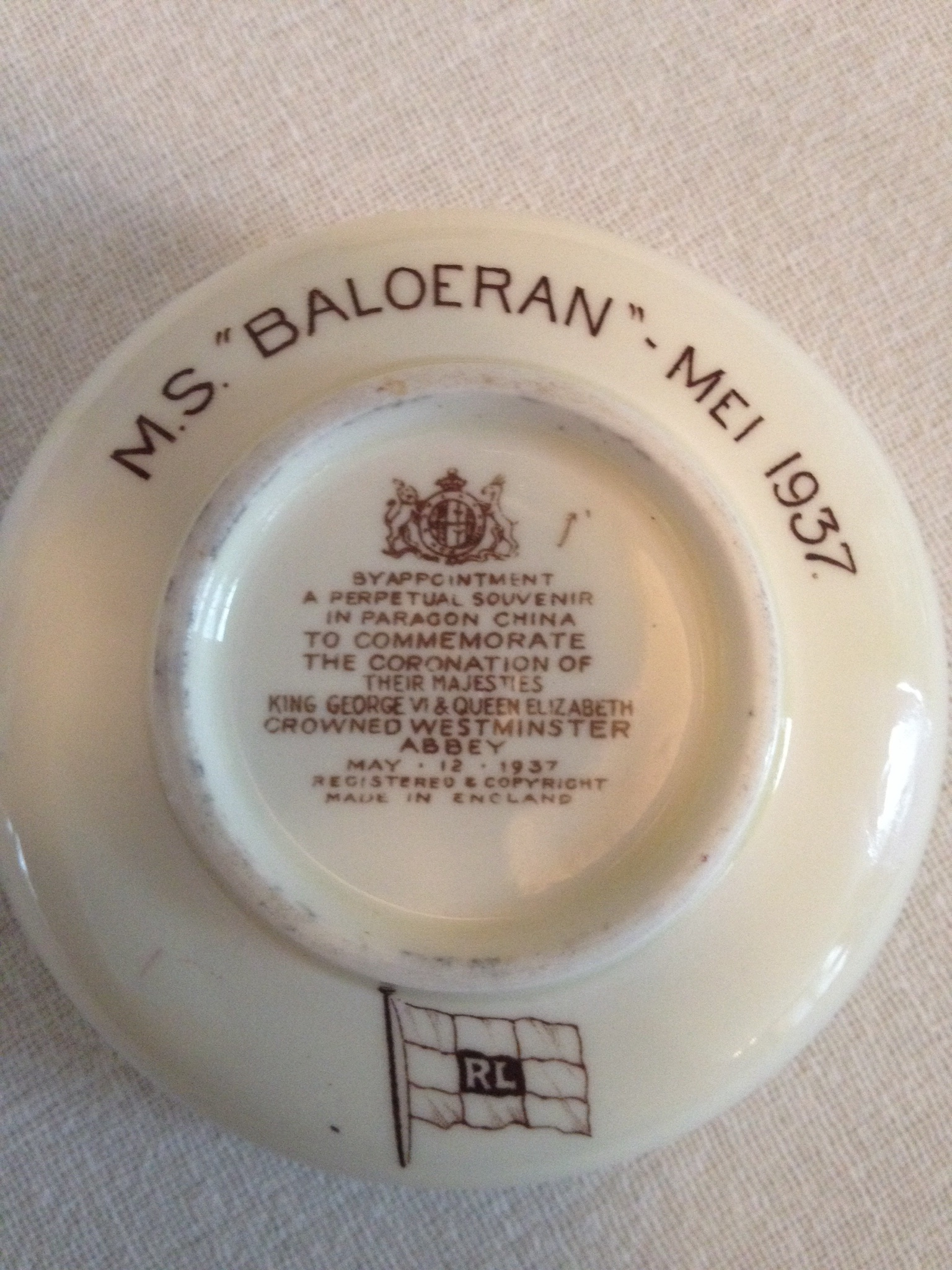
Warrant stating the occasion

The Paragon China Company was a British manufacturer of bone china from 1919 to 1960, based in Longton, Stoke-on-Trent, previously known as the Star China Company, and more recently part of the Royal Doulton group. Paragon was noted for producing high quality teaware and tableware, and was granted royal warrants of appointment by several members of the British royal family.

== History ==
The Star China company was founded in 1897 as a partnership between Herbert Aynsley (great-grandson of the founder of Aynsley China) and Hugh Irving, trading until 1919, and using Paragon as a trade name from about 1900. In 1919, after Aynsley's retirement the company name was changed to Paragon China Company Limited. Irving's two sons subsequently became managing directors of the business.

In its early history the firm manufactured tea and breakfast wares, exporting to Australia, New Zealand and South Africa. However, in the 1930s, Paragon expanded both its market, to include the Americas, and its range of products to include dinnerware. Also at this time, Paragon began its move towards creating a smokeless factory, installing electric kilns.

The 1960s saw the company change hands several times, owned for a while by T.C. Wild, then forming part of Allied English Potteries, then becoming part of Royal Doulton.

The Paragon name has been retained, mainly with designs based on traditional floral patterns. The early Paragon pattern books are presumed lost, however the royal commemorative designs are still sought by collectors.

== Royal warrants ==
- 1926 - The Duchess of York (Lady Elizabeth Bowes-Lyon) commissioned china for the nursery of Princess Elizabeth (later Queen Elizabeth II). This pattern is known as "Two for Joy", originating from the English number rhyme One for sorrow, Two for joy associated with magpies, and the legend that two magpies were seen at the christening of Princess Elizabeth.

Cup and saucer commissioned to mark the birth of Princess Margaret

- 1930 - The Duchess of York commissioned a tea service to mark the birth of Princess Margaret Rose (later Princess Margaret, Countess of Snowdon). This pattern also has two birds, as well as marguerite and rose flower designs, referring to the given names of the princess.
- 1933 - Queen Mary granted a Royal Warrant of Appointment
- 1937 - King George VI and Queen Elizabeth granted a royal warrant for the occasion of their coronation
- 1938 - Queen Elizabeth (the future Queen Mother) and Queen Mary granted a Royal Warrant of Appointment
- 1953 - Queen Elizabeth II granted a Royal Warrant of Appointment
