= Dresden, Staffordshire =

District in Staffordshire

Coordinates: 52.978°N 2.138°W

Dresden
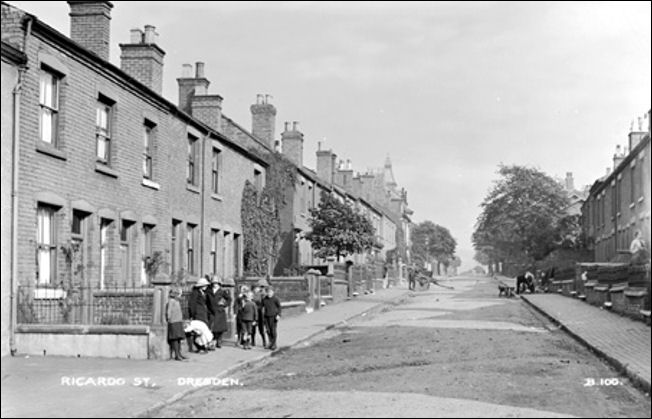
- Ricardo Street, about 1900

- Location within Staffordshire
- Population: 5,089 (2011.Ward. Dresden and Florence)
- OS grid reference: SJ909424
- Unitary authority: Stoke-on-Trent
- Ceremonial county: Staffordshire
- Region: West Midlands
- Country: England
- Sovereign state: United Kingdom
- Post town: STOKE-ON-TRENT
- Postcode district: ST3
- Dialling code: 01782
- Police: Staffordshire
- Fire: Staffordshire
- Ambulance: West Midlands
- UK Parliament: Stoke-on-Trent South

Dresden is a southern district of Stoke-on-Trent, Staffordshire, England, on Trentham Road (A5035) south of Longton.

== Background ==
The district was developed in the 1850s by the Longton Freehold Land Society in an area formerly called Spratslade. It is thought the name Dresden, associated with porcelain from Dresden in Germany, was adopted by the promoters of the Society to encourage the sale of shares in the Society and of building plots.

The Society bought Spratslade Farm, and the estate, planned out by Thomas Forrester, land surveyor of Longton, was divided into eleven streets and 190 plots. Streets were named after prominent national politicians, such as Richard Cobden, and local politicians, such as John Lewis Ricardo.

== Church ==
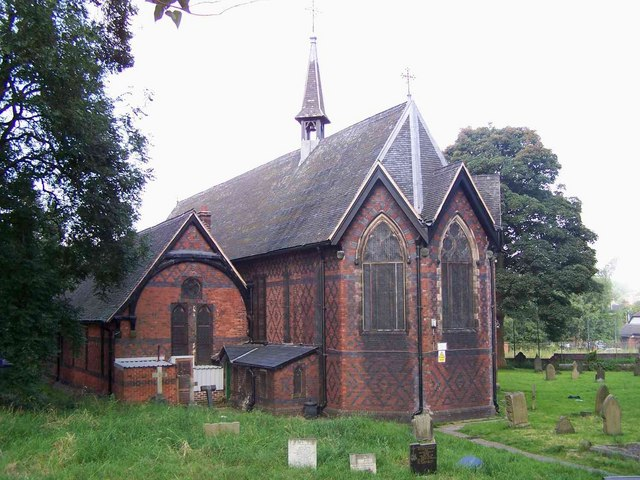
Church of the Resurrection

The Church of the Resurrection, on Red Hill, was designed by George Gilbert Scott and was built in 1853, on land provided by the Duke of Sutherland. It is built, in Early English style, of red brick with diaper ornament in blue brick. Because of increasing population, the building was extended in 1863, and by Charles Lynam in 1873. The chancel was enlarged in 1903 by J. H. Beckett, and the building was renovated in 1927–30.

It is a Grade II listed building. The church is now closed for worship.

== Queen's Park ==
Queen's Park is on the south side of Dresden. 45 acres (18 ha) of land was given by the Duke of Sutherland to the Borough of Longton to create the park, named to mark the Golden Jubilee of Queen Victoria. It was designed by John H. Garrett, the Duke of Sutherland's land agent; it was laid out in 1887 and opened the following year. It was the first public pleasure ground in the Potteries. John Aynsley, a local manufacturer and mayor of Longton, was instrumental in the project for the park.

It is Grade II* listed in the Register of Historic Parks and Gardens of Special Historic Interest in England; the listing text notes that its design is essentially unchanged from the original layout. There is a network of pathways, open spaces and mature trees, lakes and a bandstand. The stone clock tower is a notable feature.

== War memorial ==
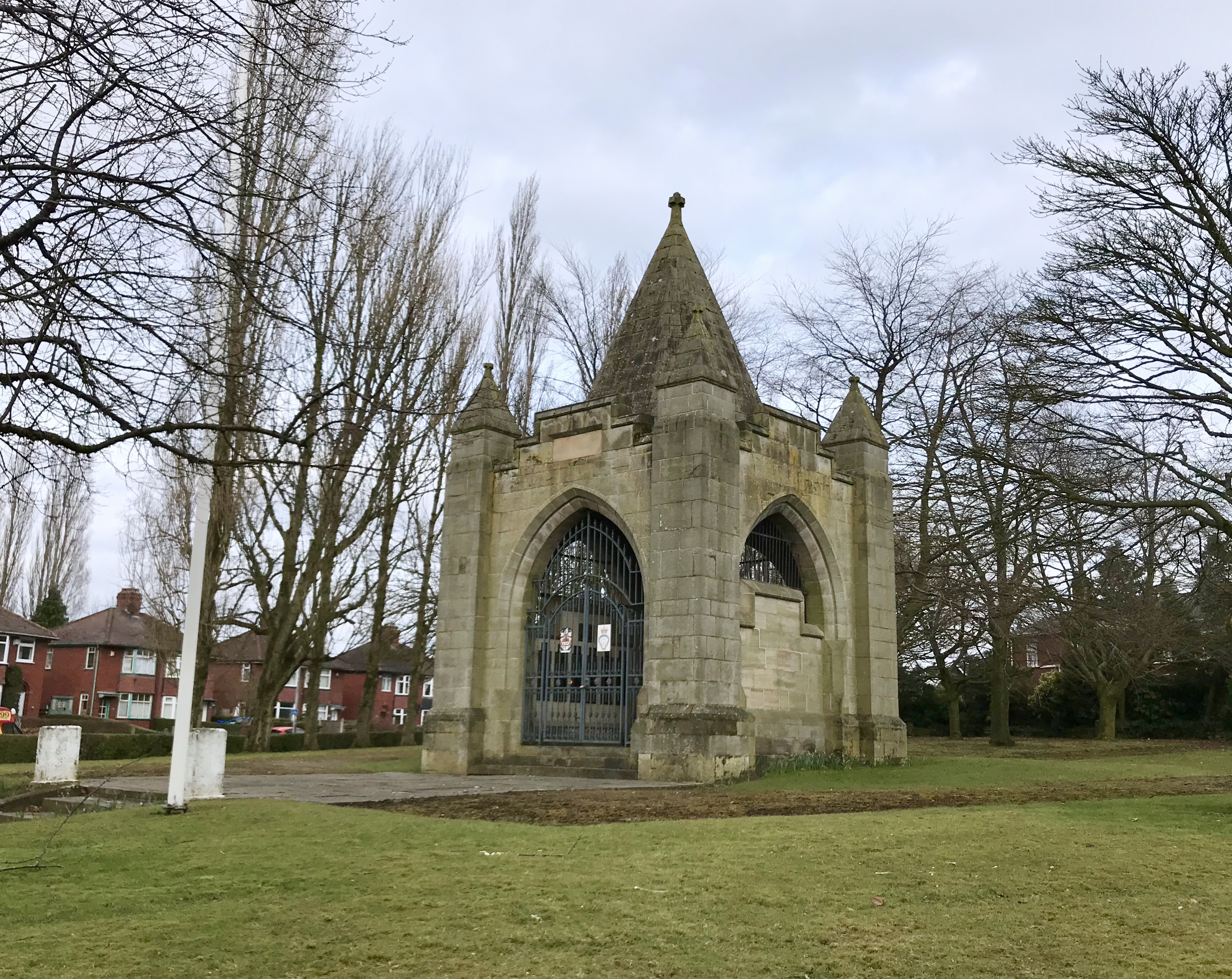
The war memorial

Longton War memorial is near Queen's Park, by the junction of Queen's Park Road and Trentham Road. It was erected in the 1920s. There are tablets commemorating those who died in the two World Wars and in later conflicts.

== Notable people ==
- The composer Havergal Brian was born in Dresden in 1876.
- The area was home to Dresden United F.C., a football team which was active in the late 19th century.
- The film and television actor Freddie Jones was born in Villiers Street, Dresden, in 1927.
