= Longton, Staffordshire =

One of the Six Towns of Stoke-on-Trent, in Staffordshire, England

Coordinates: 52.9877°N 2.1327°W

Longton
- Federated town and district
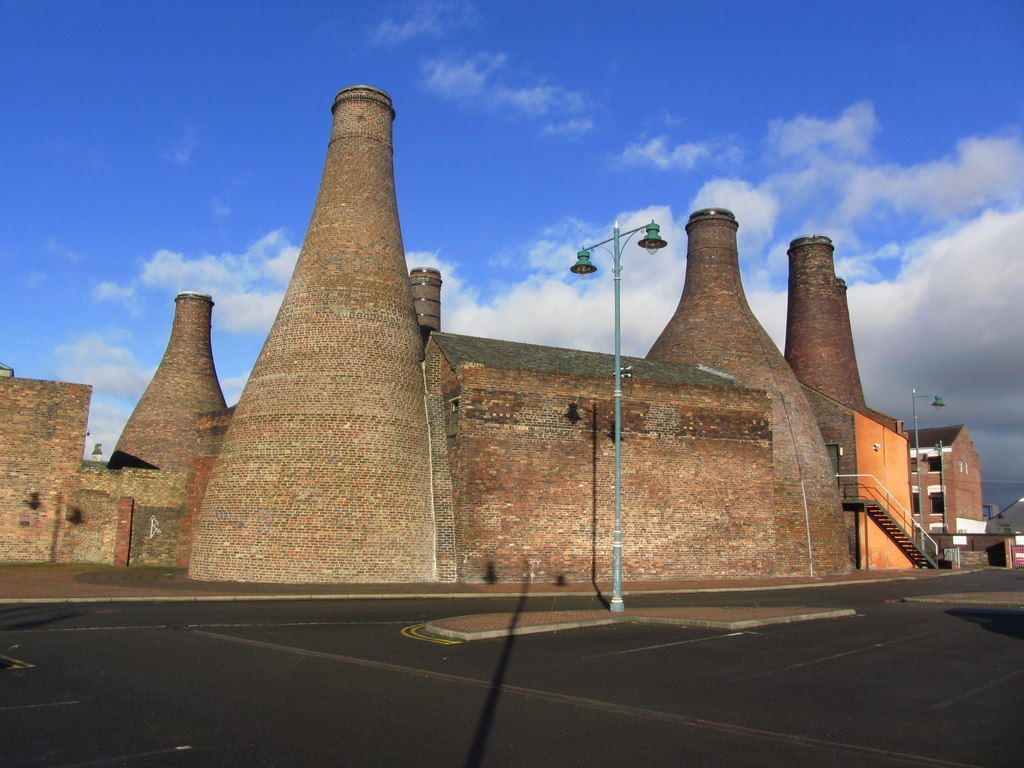
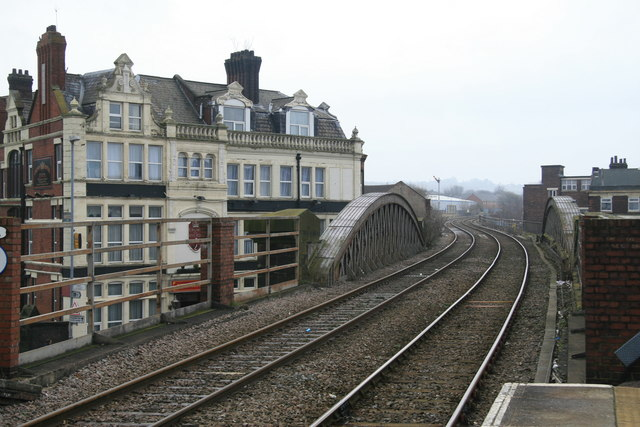
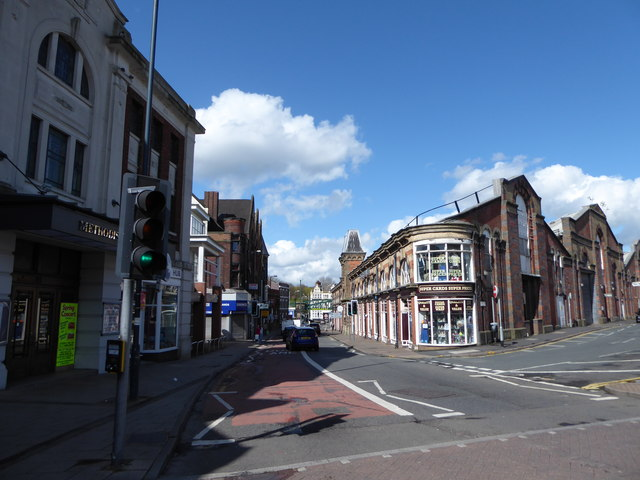
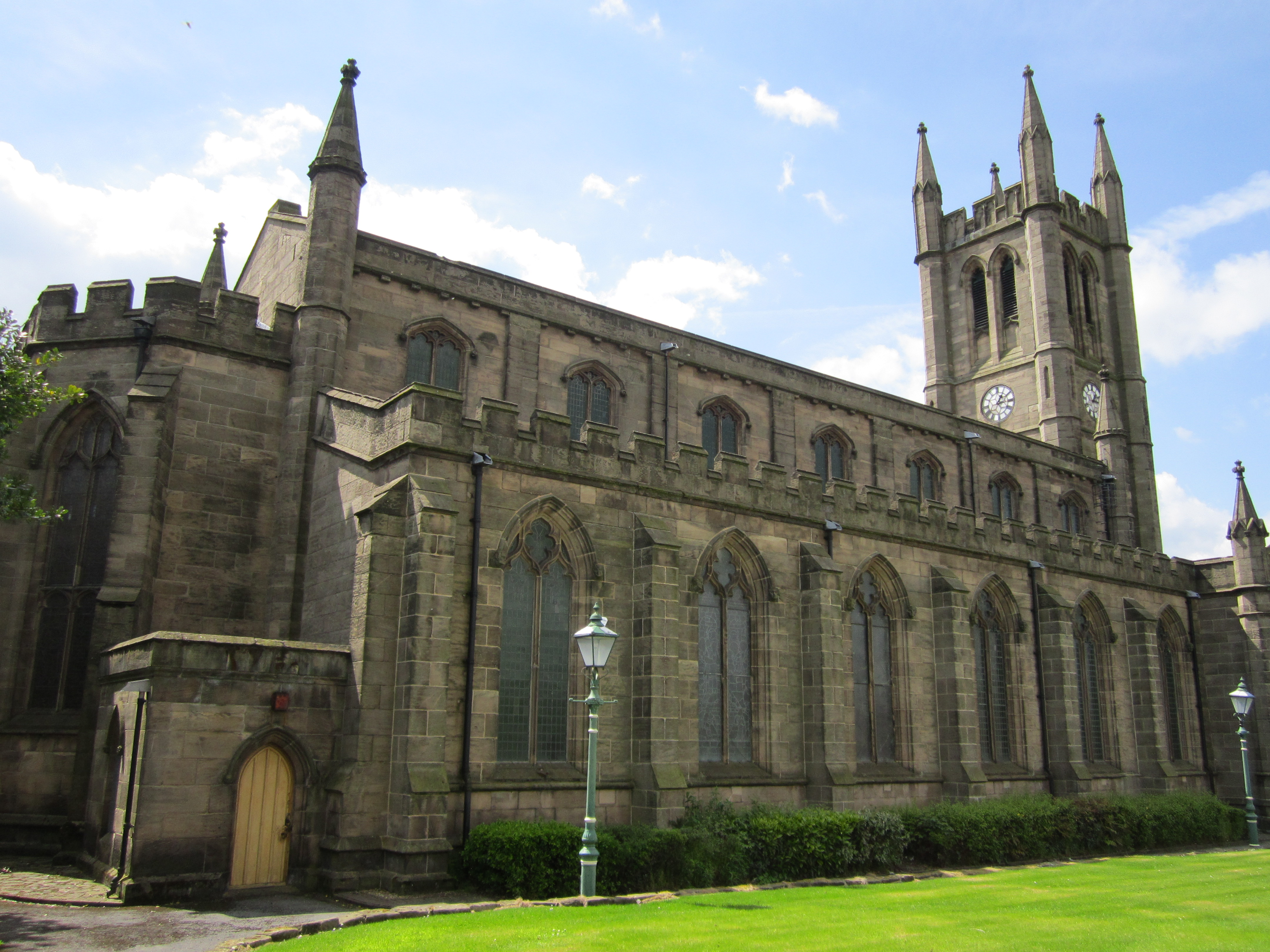
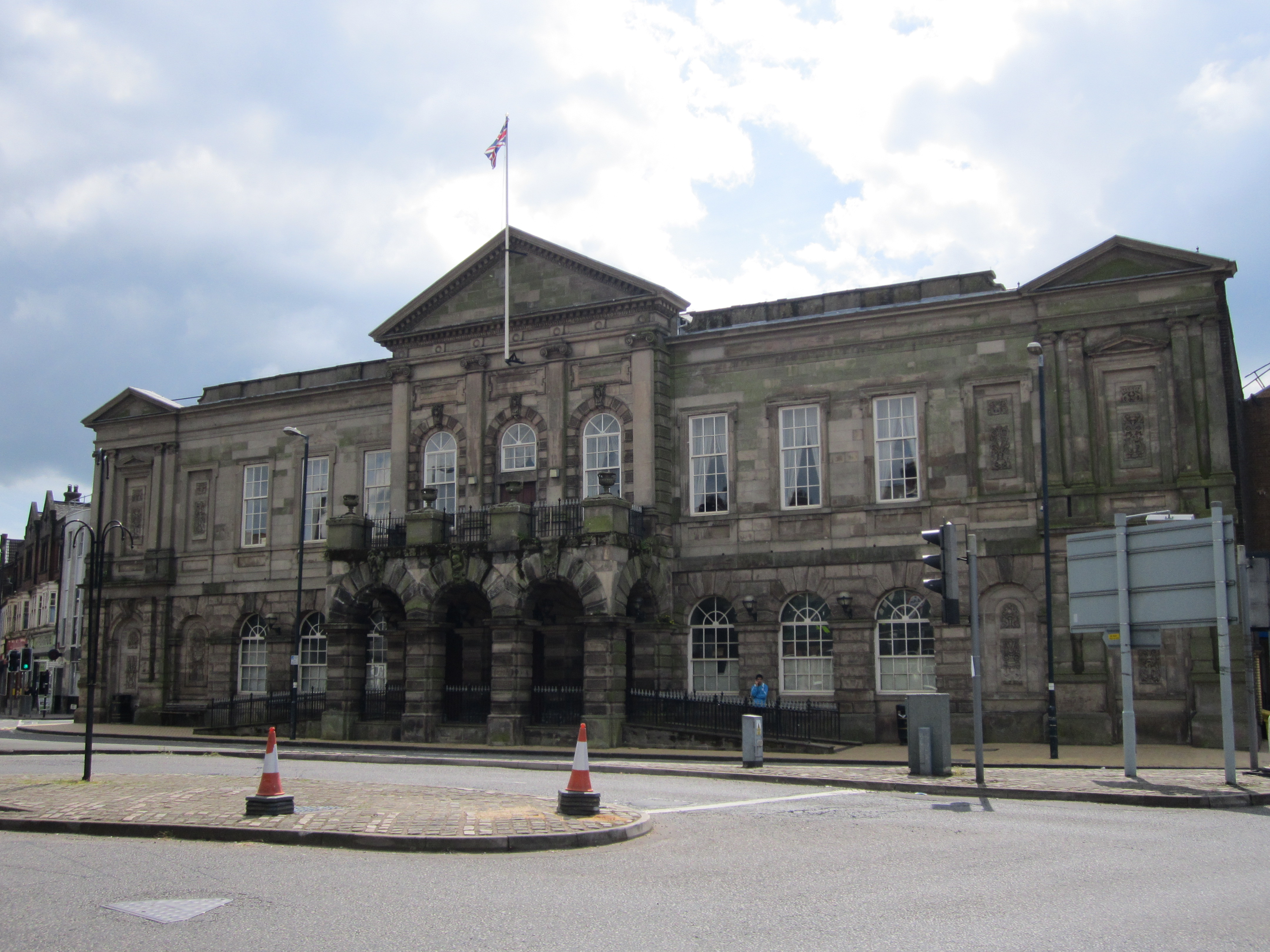
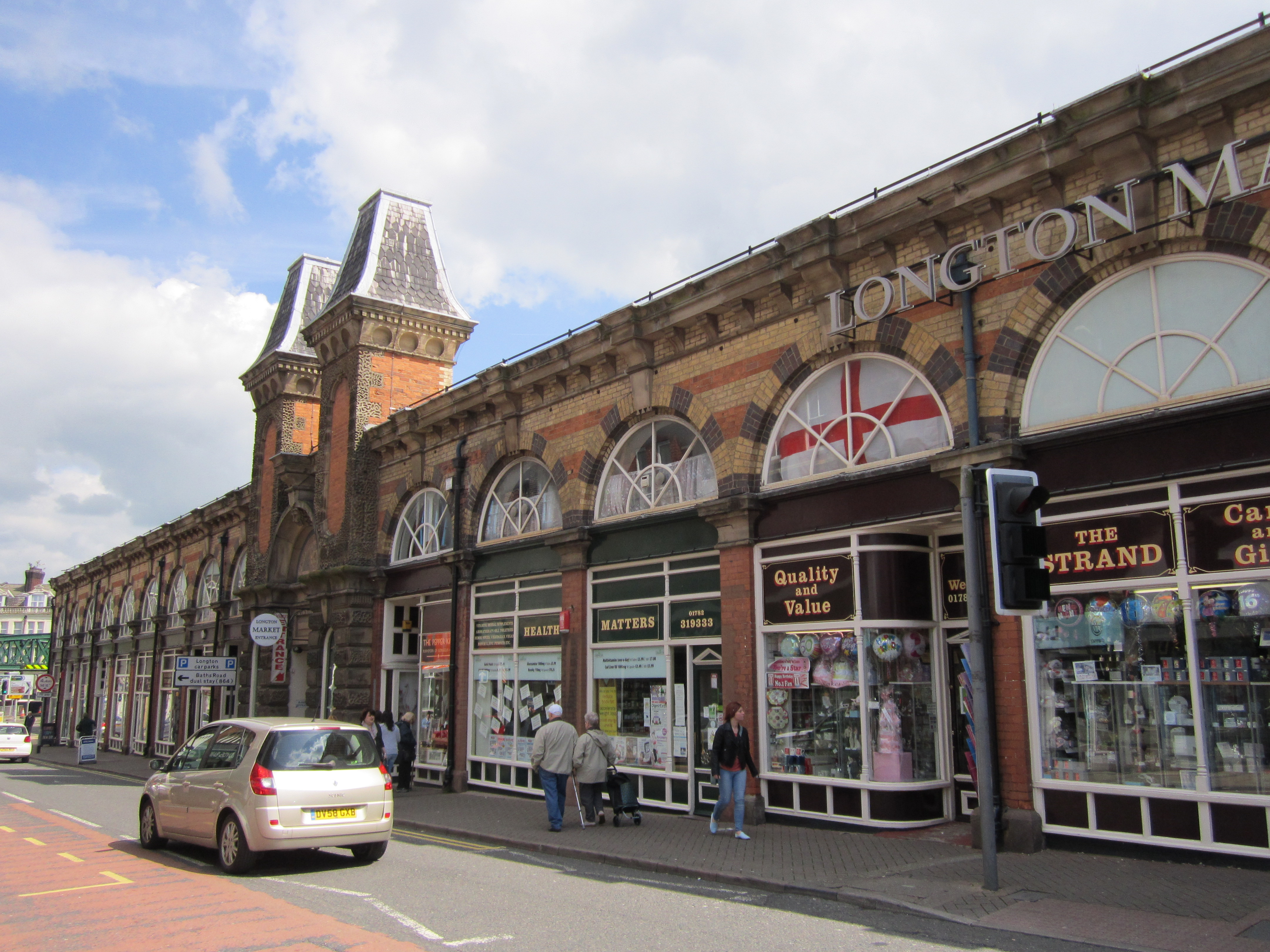
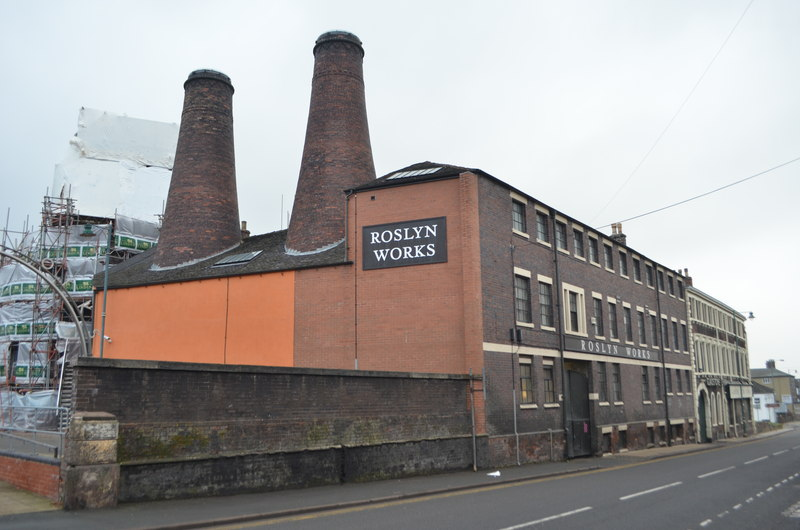
- Top: Longton Gladstone Pottery Museum; Upper: Railway Bridge with the Crown Hotel and the Strand; Lower: St James' Church and Old Town Hall; Bottom: Market Hall and the Roslyn Works

- Location within the United Kingdom
- Population: 27,214
- OS grid reference: SJ911433
- Unitary authority: Stoke-on-Trent
- Ceremonial county: Staffordshire
- Region: West Midlands
- Districts of the town: List: Adderley Green; Blurton (part); Dresden; Florence; Lightwood; Meir; Meir Heath; Normacot; Weston Coyney
- Post town: STOKE-ON-TRENT
- Postcode district: ST3
- Dialling code: 01782
- Police
- Fire
- Ambulance
- UK Parliament: Stoke-on-Trent South

Longton is one of the six towns which amalgamated to form the county borough of Stoke-on-Trent in 1910, along with Hanley, Tunstall, Fenton, Burslem and Stoke-upon-Trent in Staffordshire, England.

== History ==
Longton ('long village') was a market town in the parish of Stoke in the county of Staffordshire. The town still has a market housed in an attractively renovated market hall. Longton is an ancient village with hundreds of years of history. It was a long, straggling township (hence its name) for centuries until its population doubled in the space of a decade, the 1960s.

Coal miners in the Hanley and Longton area ignited the 1842 general strike and associated Pottery Riots. The summer of 1842 was a time of riot across the north and midlands of England, including north Staffordshire. The riot impacts employees strike in pottery factories, which were dependent on coal to fire their wares, and many pottery workers had their hours of work reduced, leading to great hardship. On 14 and 15 August 1842 the prominent radical writer and poet, Thomas Cooper, spoke at a number of open-air meetings in Stoke-on-Trent in support of the local colliers entry. Following his speech on 15 August, a number of men marched through Hanley, Shelton, Stoke, Penkhull, Fenton and Longton destroying property and encouraging others to join them. The riots continued through the night and the following morning a large crowd assembled in Burslem.

Longton was historically in the ancient parish of Stoke upon Trent, in March 1865, Longton and Lane End were incorporated as the Borough of Longton, on 31 December 1894 Longton became a civil parish. On 1 April 1910, the town was federated into the county borough of Stoke-on-Trent. On 1 April 1922 the parish was abolished and merged with Stoke on Trent. At the 1921 census (the last before the abolition of the parish), Longton had a population of 37,812. Longton and Lane-End are two townships, or liberties, forming one flourishing market town now commonly called Longton, and situated at the southern extremity of the Potteries, five miles South East of Newcastle .

Arnold Bennett referred to Longton as Longshaw, one of the "five towns" featured in his novels set in the Staffordshire Potteries.

A shopping precinct, the Bennett Precinct, opened in 1962. It is now named Longton Exchange.

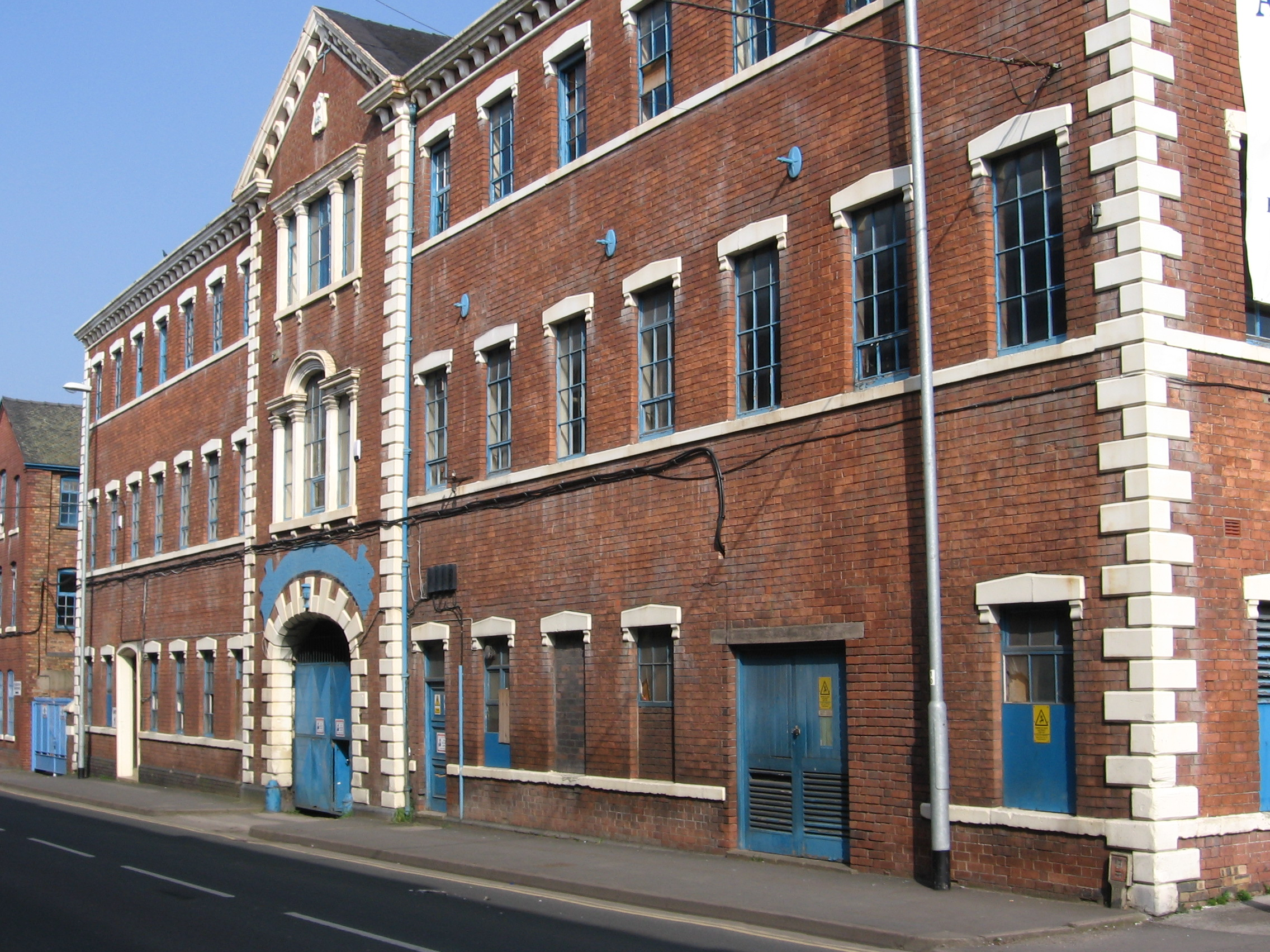
Aynsley Pottery

== Industry ==
The district has a long history as a base for the pottery industry, such as Paragon China and Aynsley, and several major manufacturers still have a presence, along with Gladstone Pottery Museum. Roslyn Works, which adjoins the latter, is now home to several small-scale manufacturers of ceramics.

Florence colliery, which opened in the 19th century, was one of the pits of the North Staffordshire Coalfield. It was connected underground to another pit at Hem Heath. It was closed in the 1990s.

Belstaff of Longton is a garment manufacturer best known for producing waterproof jackets. Founded in Longton in 1924 by Eli Belovitch and his son in law Harry Grosberg, Belstaff produced all-weather jackets for motorcyclists, and was the first company to use waxed cotton.

== Landmarks ==
=== Public buildings ===
Longton Town Hall, which was completed in 1844 and was the local seat of government until 1910, was being stripped out by contractors when it was saved from demolition in 1986.

=== Industrial buildings ===
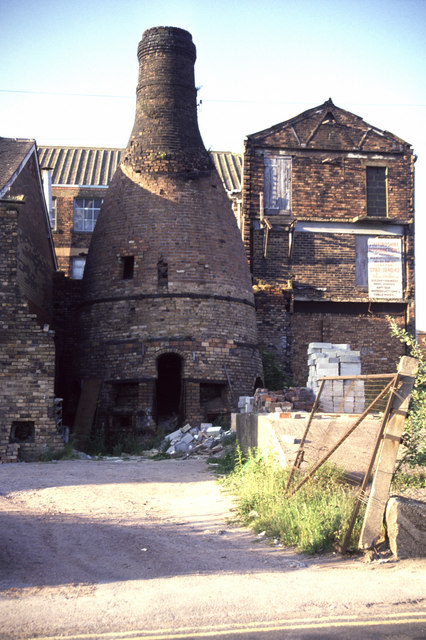
Bottle oven at Minkstone Works, Longton

There are fewer than 50 surviving bottle ovens in the city of Stoke-on-Trent (and only a scattering elsewhere in the UK). The kilns of the Gladstone Pottery Museum, along with others in the Longton conservation area represent a significant proportion of the national stock of the structures. The bottle ovens of Longton have been promoted as a tourist attraction. In the 21st century, the condition of some of the bottle ovens has given cause for concern. A Stoke-on-Trent Ceramic Heritage Action Zone was created with the double function of regenerating Longton and surviving bottle ovens throughout the city.

In addition to their industrial heritage, the industrial areas of Longton are filled with ghost stories linking them to their working class past with the Gladstone Pottery Museum, particularly, having featured on an episode of the TV program, Most Haunted.

== Transport ==
In 1997 Longton's one-way system was bypassed when a new section of the A50 was opened. It runs from Blythe Bridge to Queensway (a section of the A500), going through Longton in a cutting.

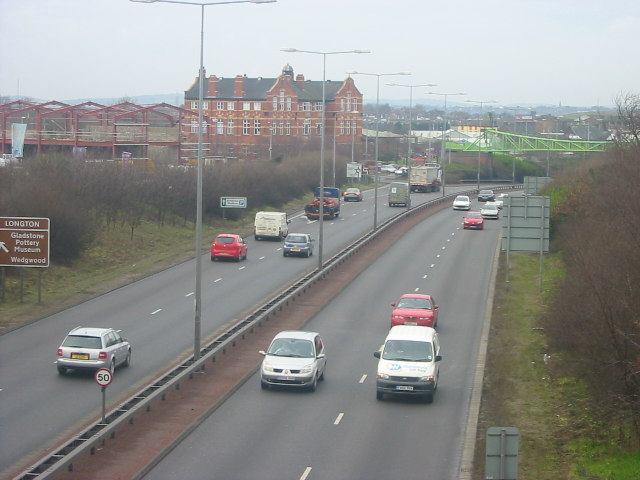
The A50 near to its cutting. The prominent building is the Sutherland Institute, Longton's library.

Longton is served by a railway station on the Crewe–Derby line. It was opened by the North Staffordshire Railway on 7 August 1848. A new bus interchange was opened adjacent to it in 2003 on the site of a former Co-op supermarket.

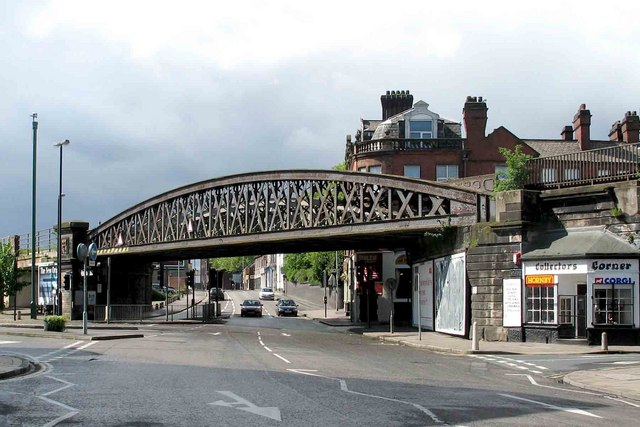
The girder bridge adjacent to Longton railway station

== Education ==
Secondary schools in the area include St Thomas More Catholic Academy and Stoke Studio College.

Together with Rochdale, then in Lancashire, Longton was host to the first Workers' Educational Association tutorial classes. R. H. Tawney, known as "the patron saint of adult education", taught the classes for three years starting in January 1908.

== Nightlife ==
Jollees Cabaret Club was a very popular nightspot in the 1970s, attracting some of the biggest names in entertainment. In the early 1990s, Shelley's Laserdome became widely known throughout the Midlands as a rave venue, but it was forced to close in 1992.

== Notable people ==
- Sir John Edensor Heathcote (c.1757–1822) Stoke-on-Trent industrialist, owner of Longton Hall, which he rebuilt in 1778.
- John Aynsley (1823–1907) potter who established the Portland Works in Longton
- John Ward (1837-1906), councillor and alderman; a noted palaeontologist
- Margaret Sherratt Keys (1856-1942), British-born American artist, china painter, store proprietor
- Percy Shelley (1860-1937) a major force in developing Shelley Potteries, born in Longton
- Ernest Albert Egerton VC WW1 recipient of the Victoria Cross
- William Thomas Astbury (1898–1961) physicist and molecular biologist who made pioneering X-ray diffraction studies of biological molecules
- Gordon Mons Higginson (1918-1993) purported spiritualist medium.
- Charles Tomlinson (1927–2015) poet, attended Longton High School
- Freddie Jones (1927–2019) actor; his many roles on film and television included Sandy Thomas in Emmerdale.
- Andrew Evans (born 1955) a soldier from Longton, stationed at Whittington Barracks, was wrongfully convicted and served 25 years in custody after confessing to the 1972 murder of Judith Roberts, a 14-year-old schoolgirl from Tamworth.

=== Sport ===
- William (Billy) Weston (1847-1935) Australasian billiards player, emigrated from Longton aged 3.
- George Arthur Gallimore (1886–1949) professional footballer who made 77 appearances for Stoke City F.C.
- Henry "Harry" Colclough (1888–1955) footballer, who made 83 appearances for Crystal Palace F.C.
- William Wootton (1904–2000) footballer, made 56 appearances for Port Vale F.C.
- Norman Henry Hallam (1920–1997) footballer, made 63 appearances for Port Vale F.C.
- Philip Adrian "Phil" Heath (born 1964) professional footballer, made 297 appearances.

== Trivia ==
- Longton is the birthplace and home of Alan Povey's character Owd Grandad Piggott

== Gallery ==
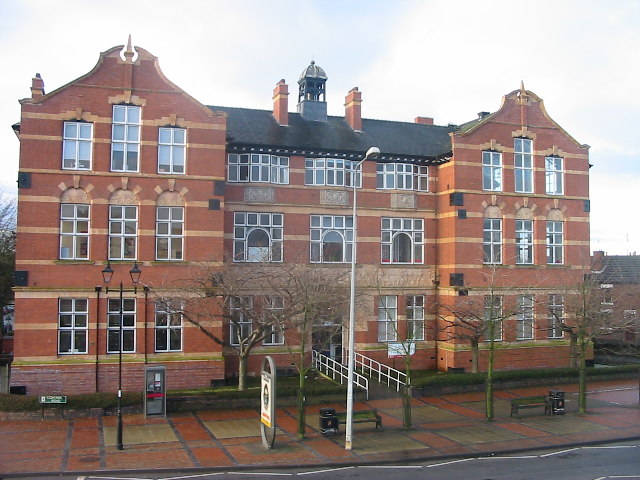
Sutherland Institute, Longton. Completed in 1898 on land donated by the Duke of Sutherland who lived at nearby Trentham Hall.

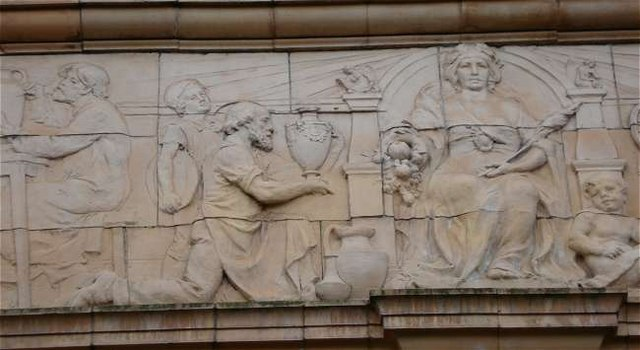
The work of potters is depicted in the terracotta frieze above the entrance to the Sutherland Institute.

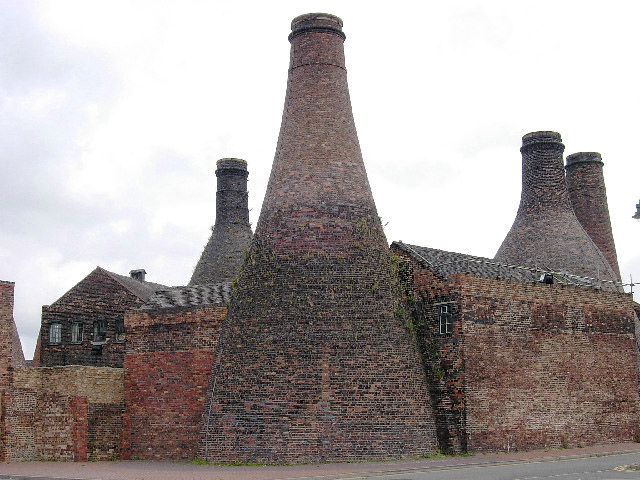
Gladstone Pottery Museum

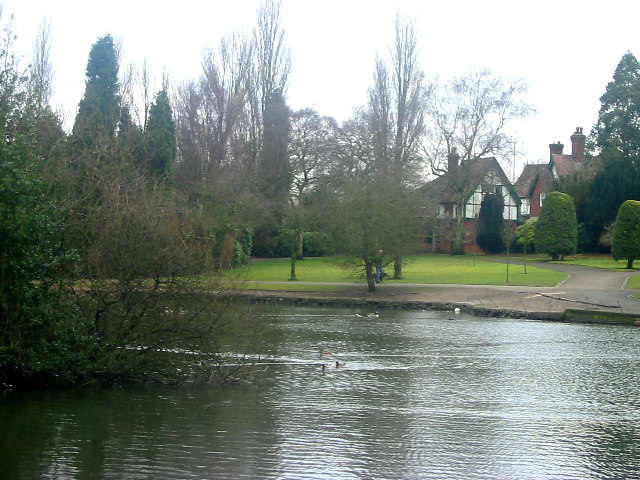
Longton Park

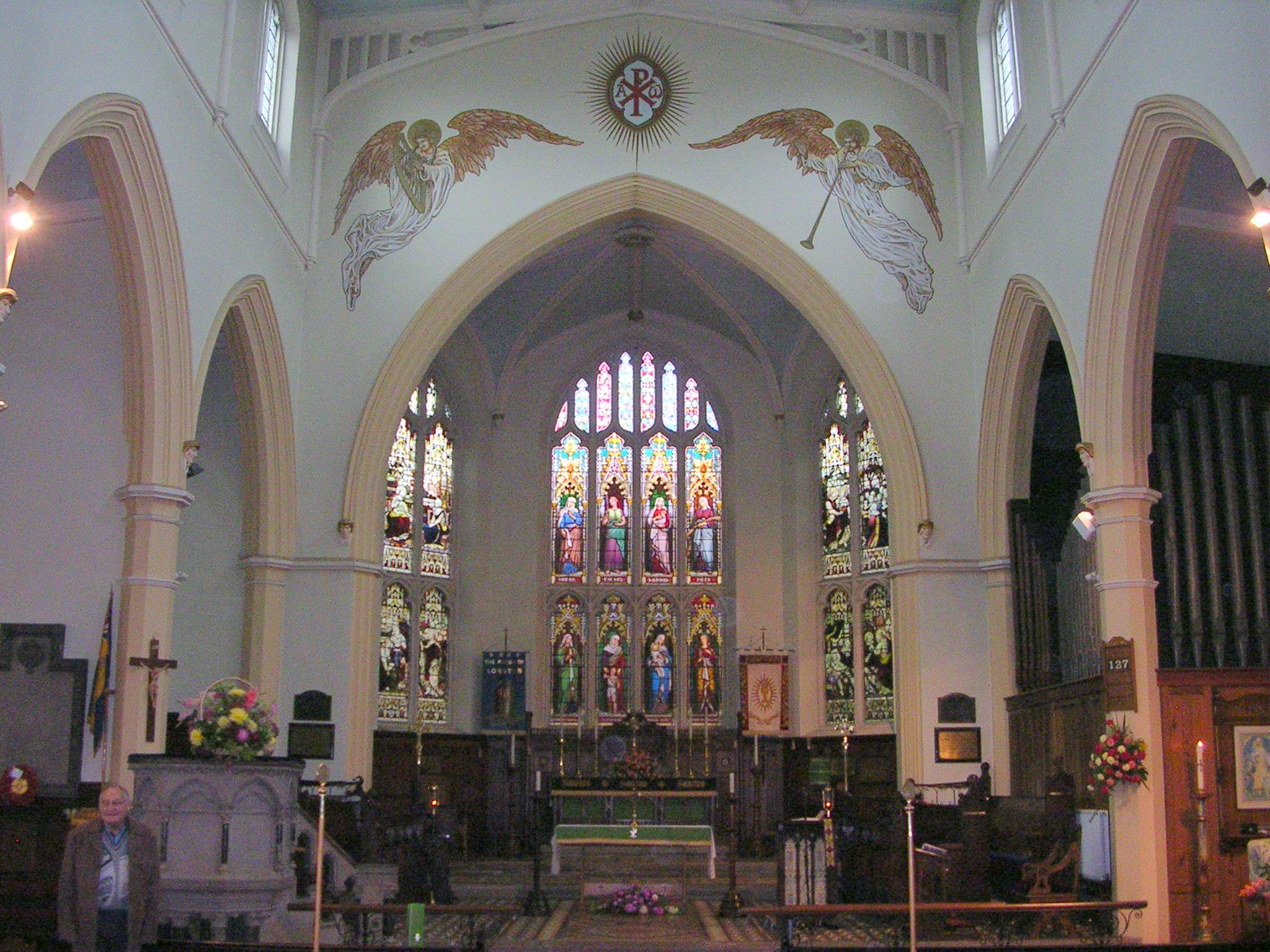
St James' Church, Longton
