= Royal warrant of appointment (United Kingdom) =

Royal powers

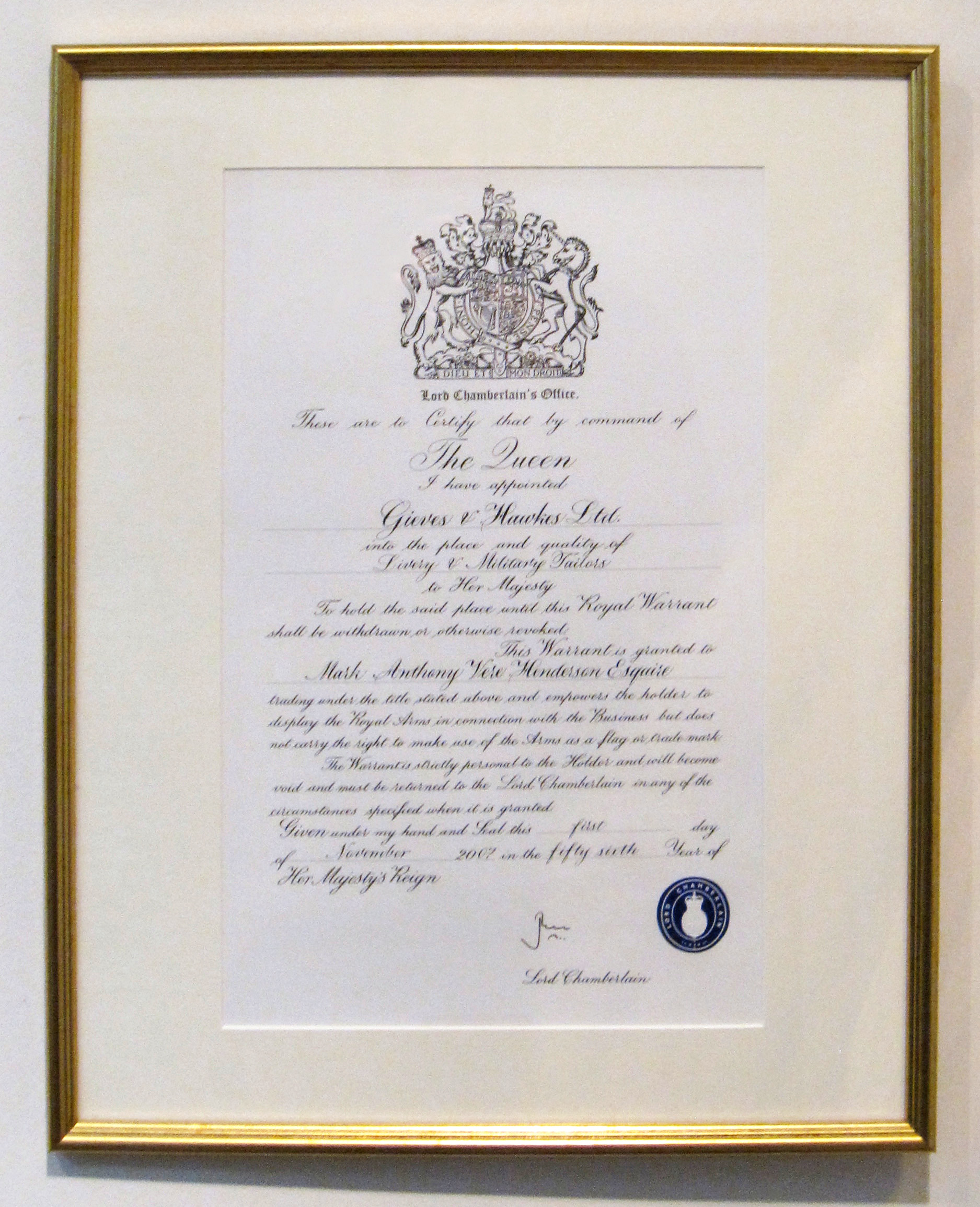
Royal warrant from Queen Elizabeth II on display at Savile Row tailor Gieves & Hawkes

Royal warrants of appointment have been issued since the 15th century to those who supply goods or services to a royal court or certain royal personages. The warrant enables the supplier to advertise the fact that they supply to the royal family, thereby lending prestige to the brand or supplier. In the United Kingdom, grants have usually been made by the monarch, their spouse, and their heir apparent to companies or tradespeople who supply goods and services to individuals in the family.

Suppliers continue to charge for their goods and services – a royal warrant of appointment does not imply that they provide goods and services free of charge. The warrant is typically advertised on billboards or company hoardings in British English, letter-heads and products by displaying the coat of arms or the heraldic badge of the royal personage as appropriate. Underneath the coat of arms will usually appear the phrase "by appointment to..." followed by the title and name of the royal customer, and then what goods are provided. No other details of what is supplied may be given.

Royal Warrant by Appointment to Charles III, as used in England and Wales and Northern Ireland, as well as the Commonwealth realms

Royal Warrant by Appointment to Charles III, as used in Scotland

Royal Warrant by Appointment to Queen Camilla (since 2024)

== History ==
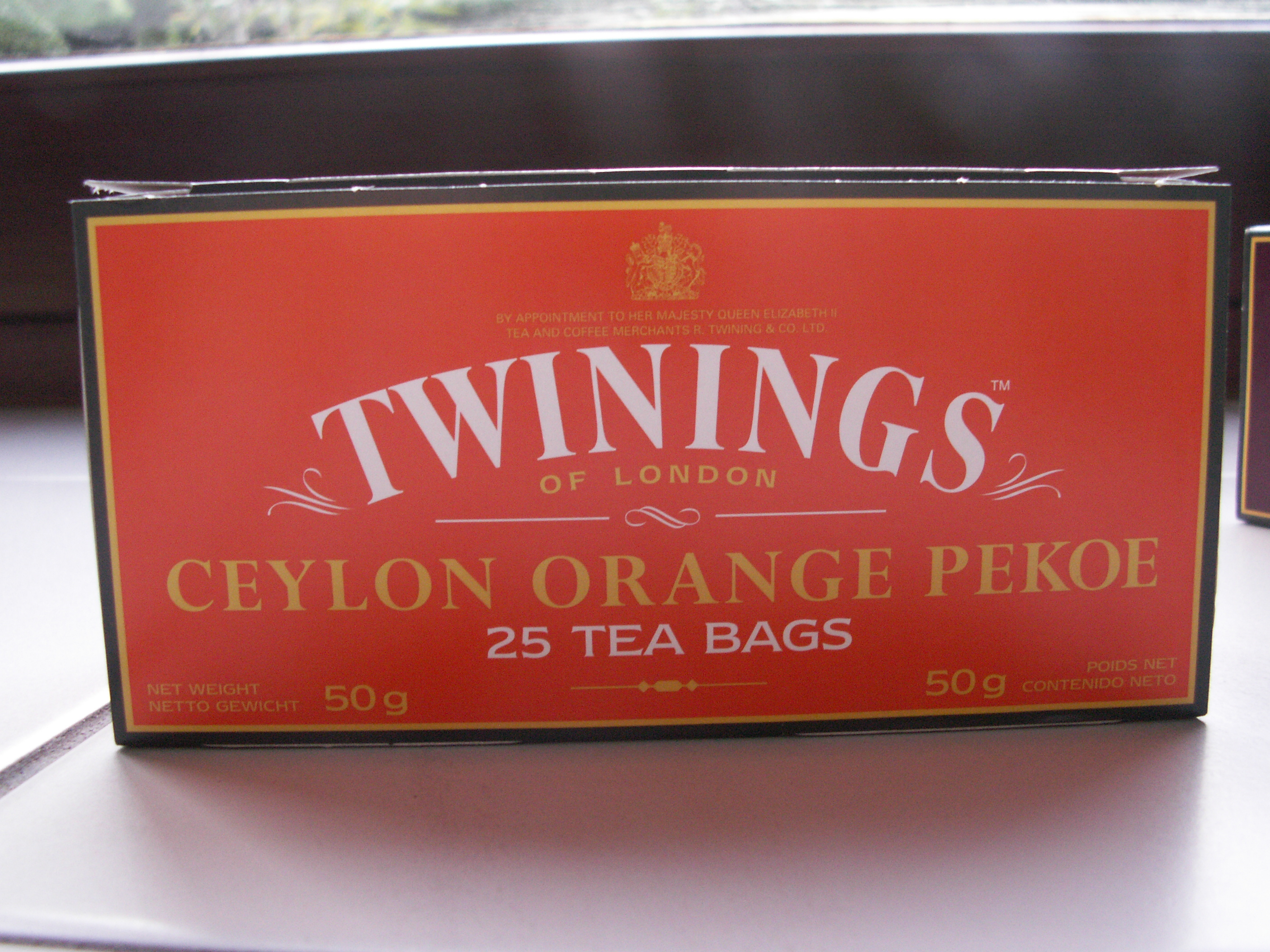
Above the Twinings name on this package, the company's royal warrant is displayed in gold.

The granting of royal patronage or royal charter was practised across Europe from the early medieval period. Initially, however, royal patronage was mainly granted to those working in the arts. Royal charters began to replace royal patronage in around the 12th century. The earliest charters were granted to the trade guilds, with the first recorded British royal charter being granted to the Weavers' Company in 1155 by Henry II of England.

By the 15th century, the royal warrant of appointment replaced the royal charter in England, providing a more formalised system of recognition. Under a royal warrant, the Lord Chamberlain appointed tradespeople as suppliers to the royal household. The printer William Caxton was one of the first recipients of a royal warrant when he became the king's printer in 1476. One of the early monarchs to grant a warrant was King Charles II of England.

A royal warrant sent a strong public signal that the holder supplied goods of a quality acceptable for use in the royal household, and by inference, inspired the confidence of the general public. At a time when product quality was a public issue, a royal warrant imbued suppliers with an independent sign of value. By the 18th century, mass market manufacturers such as Josiah Wedgwood and Matthew Boulton, recognised the value of supplying royalty, often at prices well below cost, for the sake of the publicity and kudos it generated. Royal warrants became keenly sought after and manufacturers began actively displaying the royal arms on their premises, packaging and labelling. By 1840, the rules surrounding the display of royal arms were tightened to prevent fraudulent claims. By the early 19th century, during the reign of Queen Victoria, the number of royal warrants granted rose rapidly with the granting of 2,000 warrants. Since 1885, an annual list of warrant holders has been published in The London Gazette.

Food and drink manufacturers have been some of the most important warrant holder suppliers to the palace. High-profile food and beverage suppliers with a royal warrant include Twinings of London; Bollinger; Fortnum & Mason; Heinz; Tanqueray; Gordon & Co and Schweppes.

Non-food suppliers with royal warrants include Aston Martin; Land Rover; Jaguar Cars; Boots; Axminster Carpets; Paragon China; The Irish Linen Company and Yardley London.

After the death of Queen Elizabeth II, warrants issued in her name could continue to be used for up to two years. Technically, however they were void and warrants do not automatically transfer across to the next sovereign.

== Organisation ==
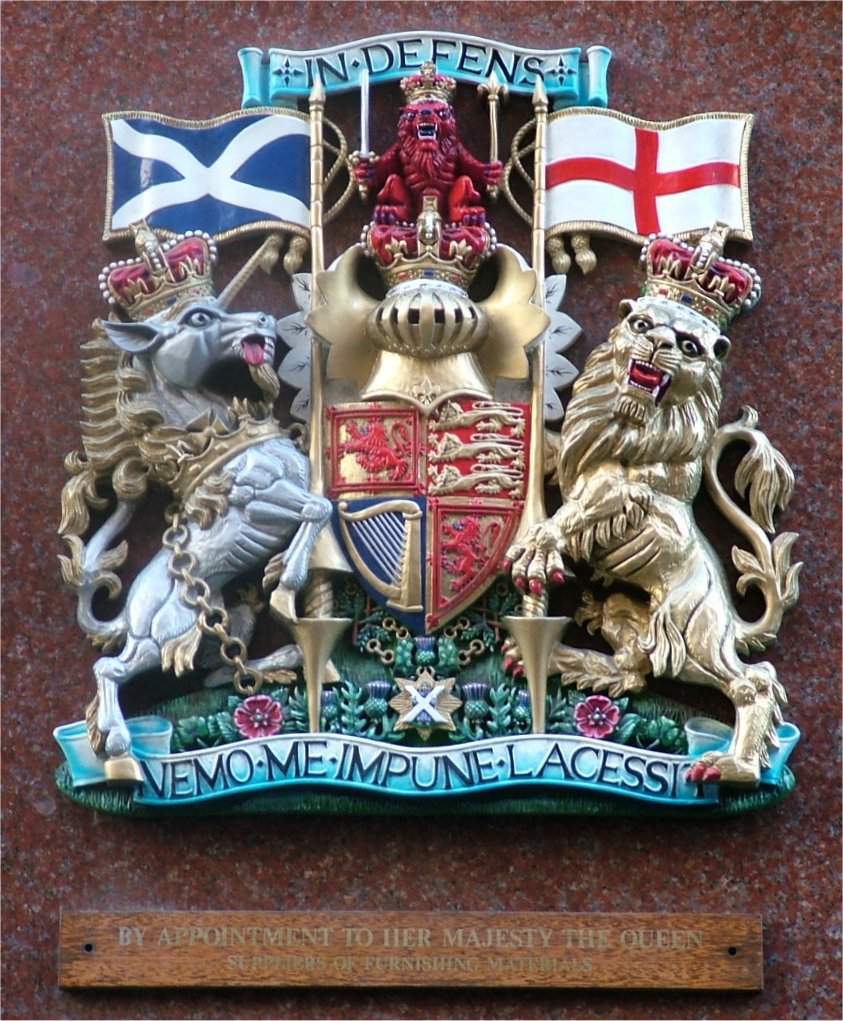
Royal warrant awarded by Queen Elizabeth II to Jenners, a department store in Edinburgh

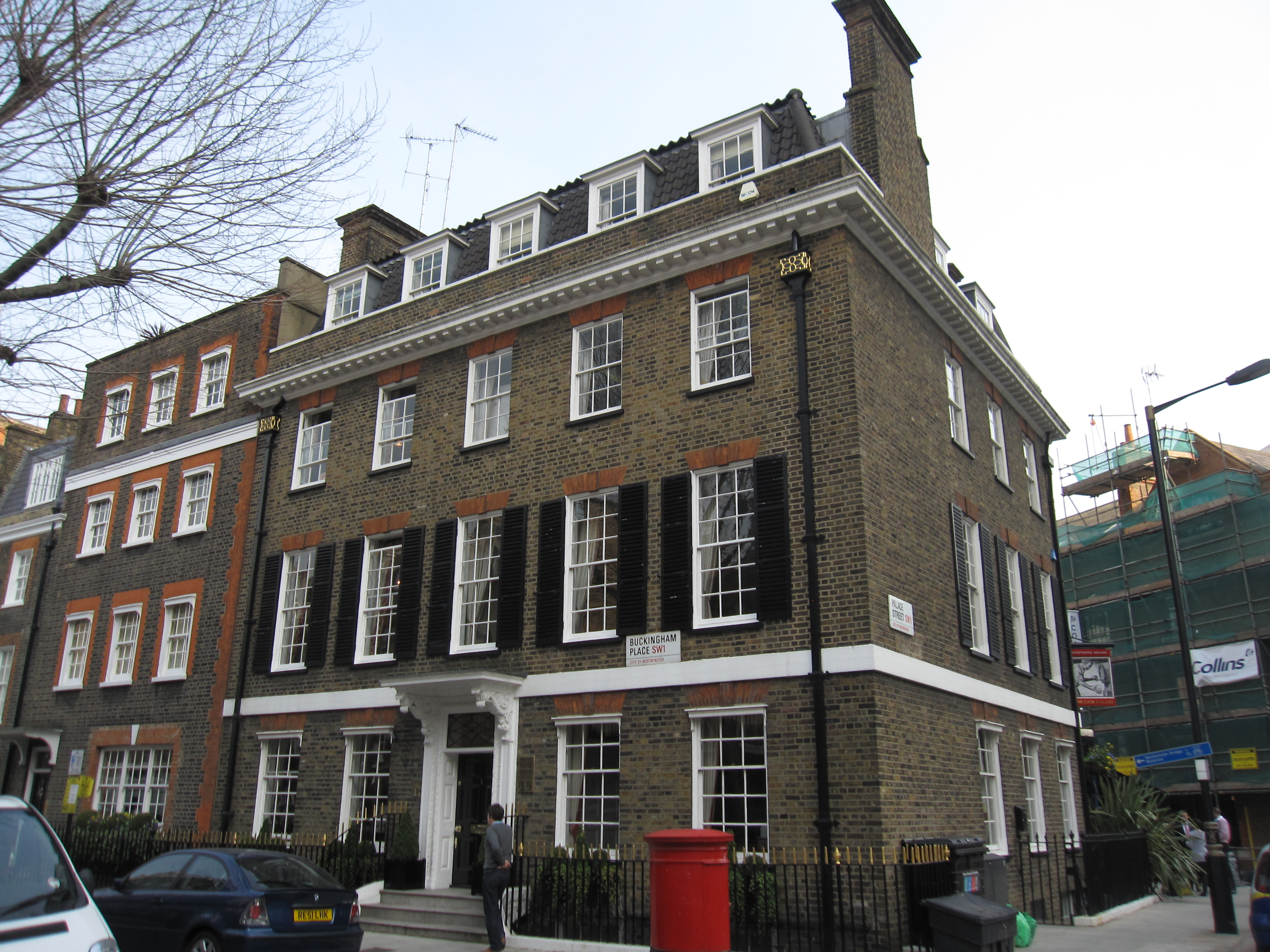
The Royal Warrant Holders Association, in Buckingham Place, London, 2011

Warrants are currently granted by King Charles III and Queen Camilla.

Warrants issued by the Queen Elizabeth the Queen Mother automatically expired no later than 2007, five years after her death.

Upon the death of Prince Philip, Duke of Edinburgh in April 2021, warrants issued in his name became void. However, warrant holders are permitted to continue to use the Royal Arms and the legend after the death of a grantor, usually for up to two years. The same occurred upon the death of Queen Elizabeth II, and upon the Prince of Wales becoming king in September 2022. In May 2024, King Charles III and Queen Camilla granted their first royal warrants of appointment of the new reign. In July 2025, the King announced that from 2026, the Prince and Princess of Wales would be able to issue their own royal warrants.

Royal warrants are awarded to only tradesmen, such as carpenters, engravers, cabinet makers, dry-cleaners, and even chimney sweeps. Some are well-known companies; many are not. The professions, employment agencies, party planners, the media, government departments, and "places of refreshment or entertainment" (such as pubs and theatres) do not qualify. As of May 2024, about 750 individuals and companies, including a few non-UK companies, hold about 800 warrants to the British royal family, with frequent changes.

The royal warrant signifies there is a satisfactory trade relation in place between the grantor and the company and that the goods nominated are suitable for supply to the royal household. Within the company, there is a nominated person called the grantee. That person is in all respects responsible for all aspects of the royal warrant.

A company must have supplied goods or services to the royal household for five years to become eligible to have its application considered for recommendation. The royal household's buyer then makes their recommendation for inclusion. It then goes in front of the Royal Household Warrants Committee, which is chaired by the Lord Chamberlain, which decides whether to accept the recommendation. It then goes to the grantor, who may sign it; the grantor is empowered not to accept the committee's decision—the final decision whether to grant a warrant is personal.

Some royal warrants have been held for more than a hundred years. Goods need not be for the use of the grantor; for example, cigarettes were bought for the use of guests of the royal family, though these warrants were cancelled in 1999 as a matter of public policy on smoking.

For business, the granting of a royal warrant is a huge boost, because royal approval may be displayed in public with the coat of royal arms of the grantor, implying that their services or products are of high quality.

Most warrant holders are members of the Royal Warrant Holders Association, which liaises closely with the palace.

== Former Royal Warrants ==
Royal Warrant by Appointment to King George III (1801–1816)

Royal Warrant by Appointment to King George III, King George IV, King William IV (1816–1837)

Royal Warrant by Appointment to Queen Victoria (1837–1901)

Royal Warrant by Appointment to Queen Victoria, King Edward VII, King George V, King Edward VIII, King George VI (1901–1952)

Royal Warrant by Appointment to Queen Elizabeth II (1952–2022)

Royal Warrant by Appointment to Queen Adelaide (1830–1849)

Royal Warrant by Appointment to Prince Albert (1840–1861)

Royal Warrant by Appointment to Queen Alexandra (1901–1925)

Royal Warrant by Appointment to Queen Mary (1910–1953)

Royal Warrant by Appointment to Queen Elizabeth the Queen Mother (1936–2002)

Royal Warrant by Appointment to Prince Philip, Duke of Edinburgh (1952–2021)

== Gallery ==
Examples of royal warrants in use:

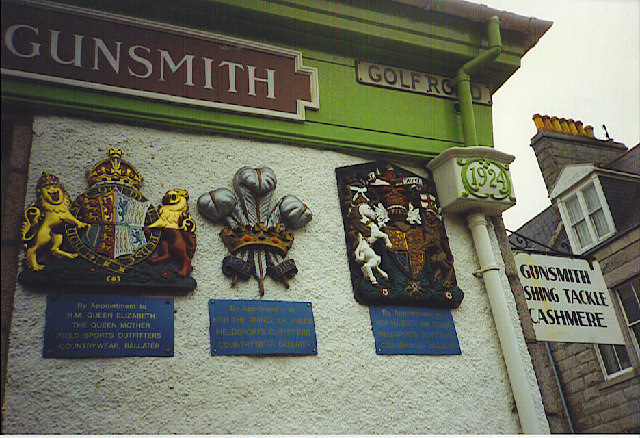
Countrywear Ballater, field sports outfitters to Elizabeth II, Prince Charles and the Queen Mother (photographed 1994)

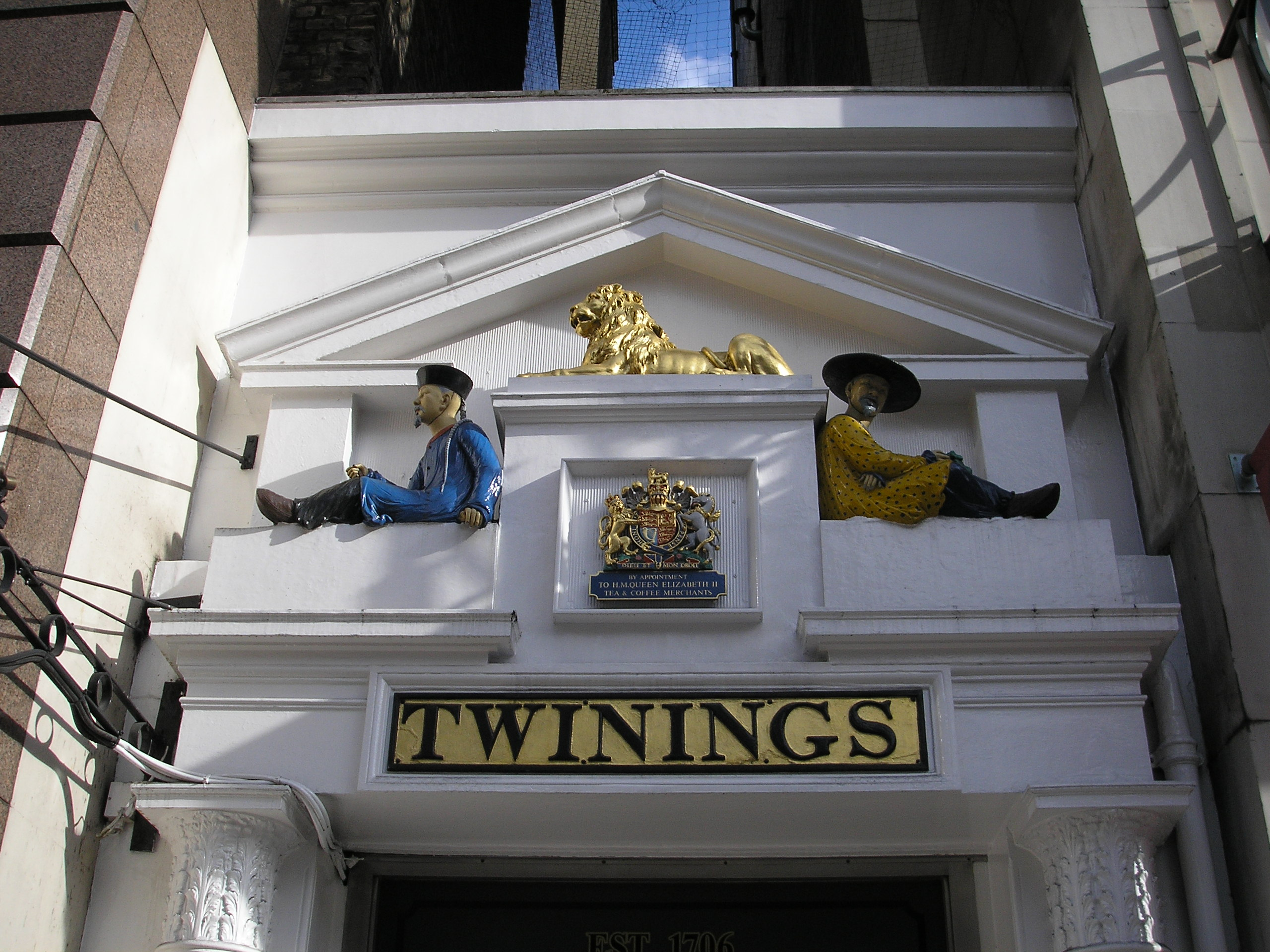
Twinings, suppliers of tea and coffee to Elizabeth II (photographed 2006)

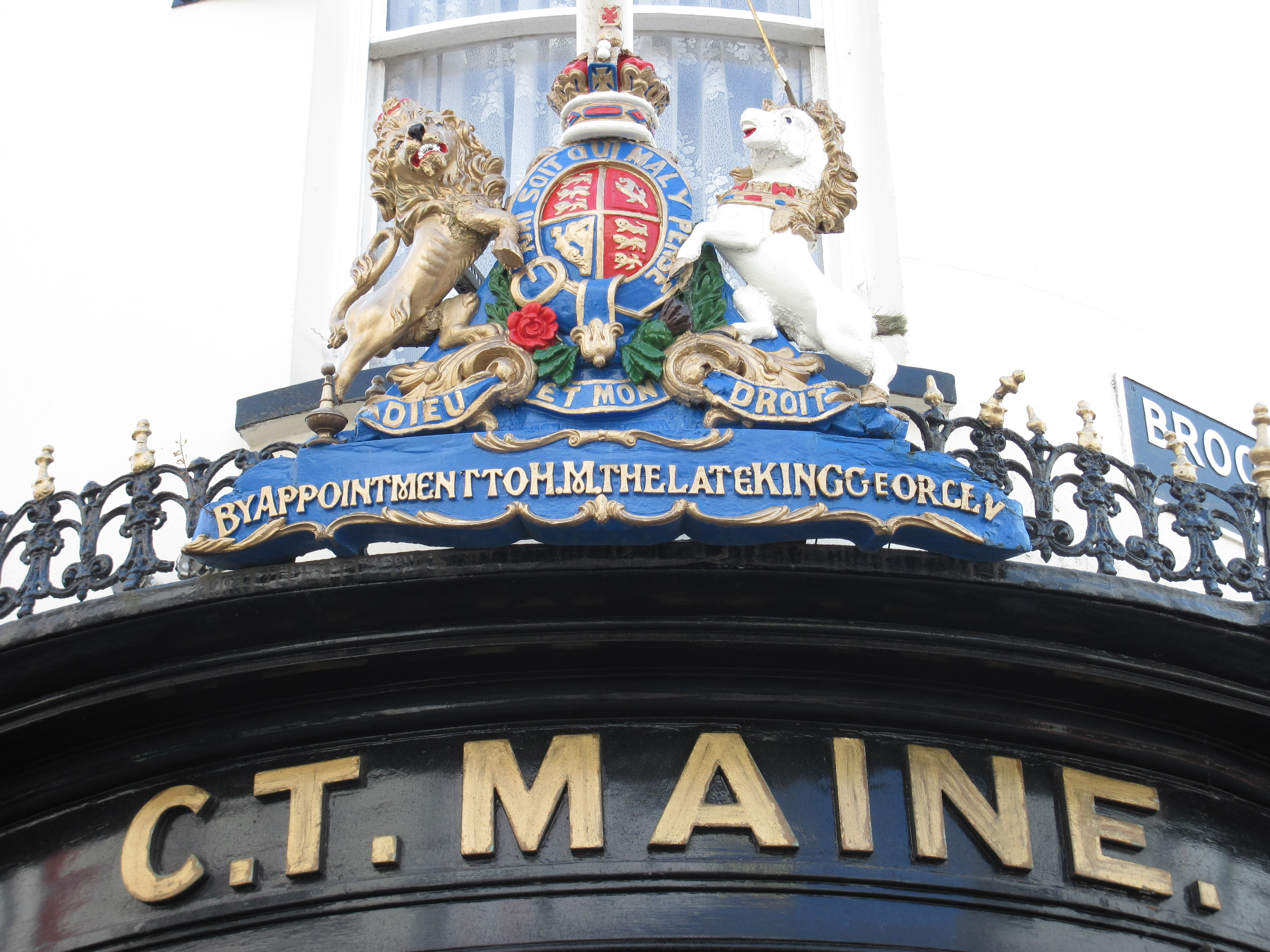
C.T. Maine, suppliers of jewellery to George V (granted c. 1921)

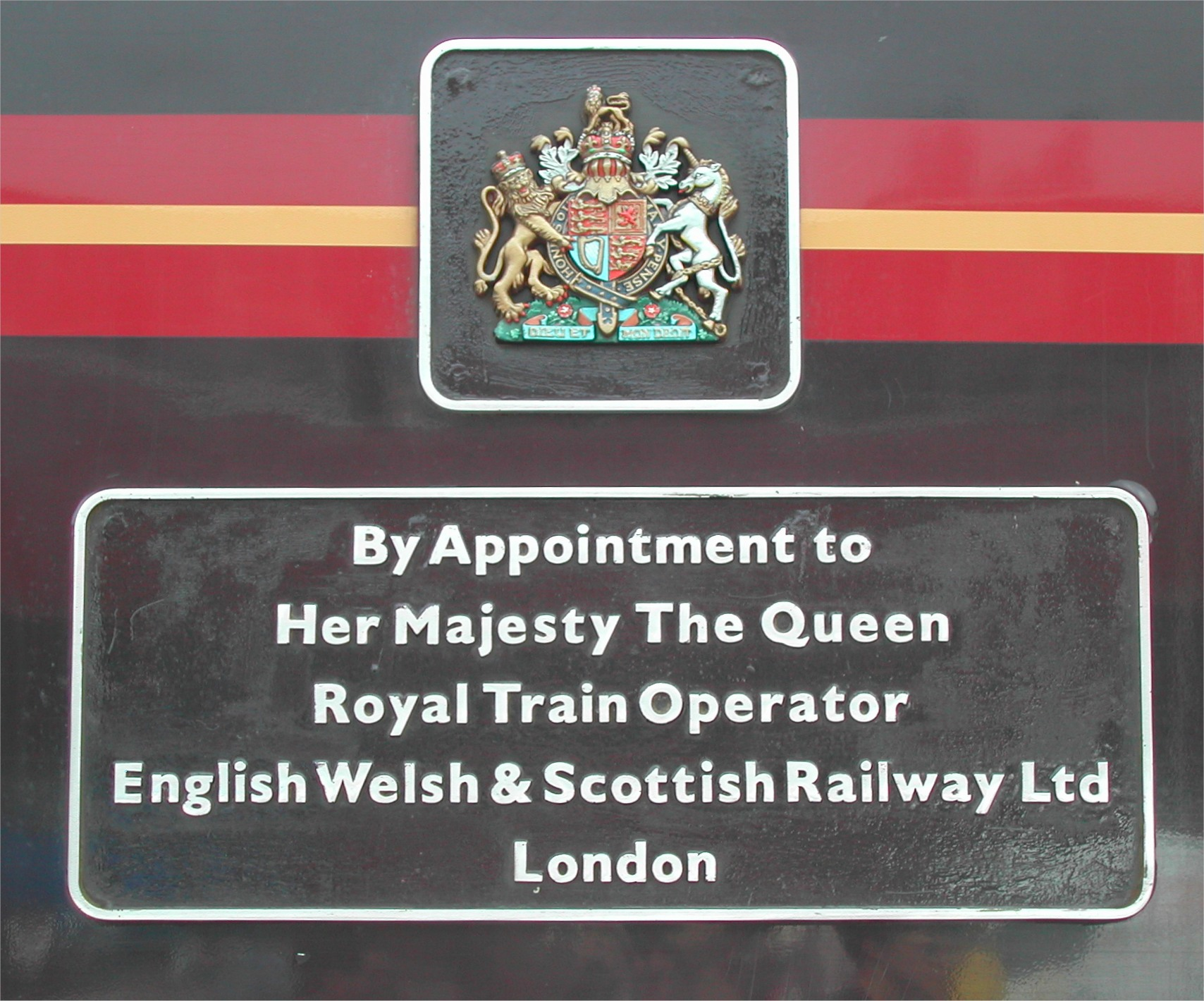
EWS Railway, royal train operator to Elizabeth II (shown on the livery of a Class 67 locomotive)

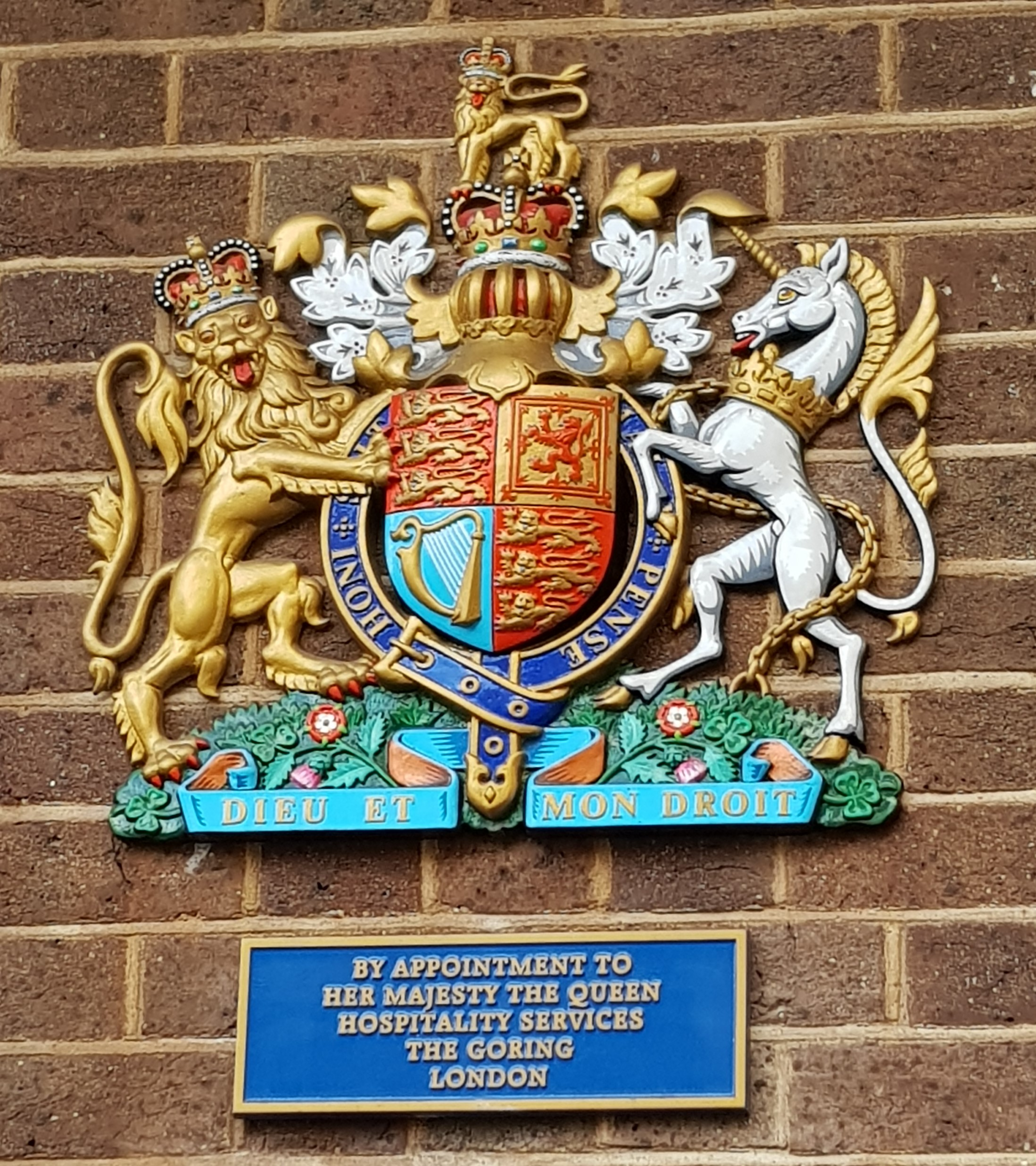
The Goring, hospitality services to Elizabeth II (granted 2013)

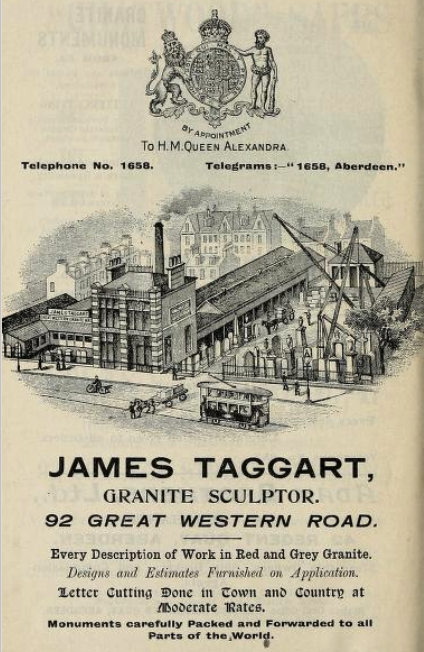
James Taggart, granite sculptor to Queen Alexandra (print ad from 1914)

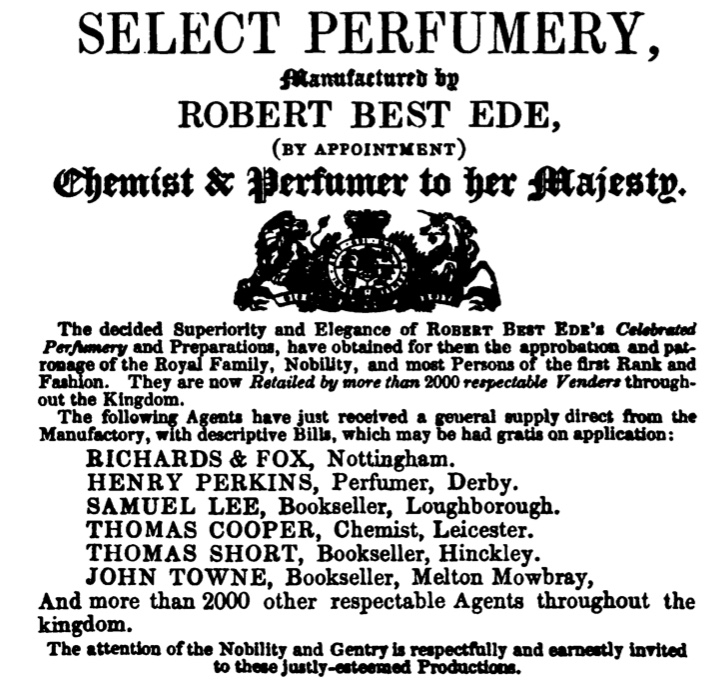
Robert Best Ede, chemist and perfumer to Queen Victoria (print ad from 1840)

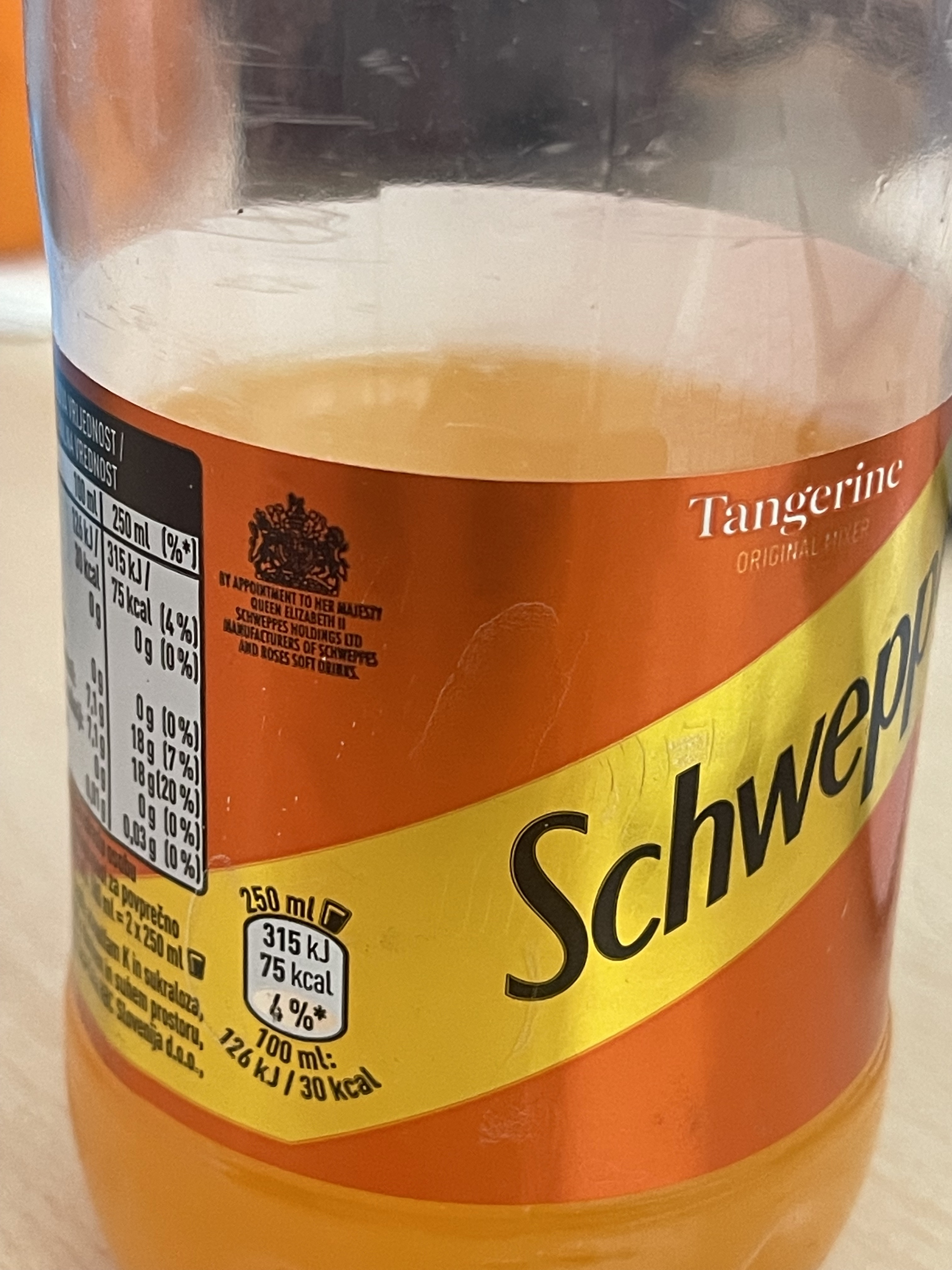
Schweppes, suppliers of soft drinks to Elizabeth II

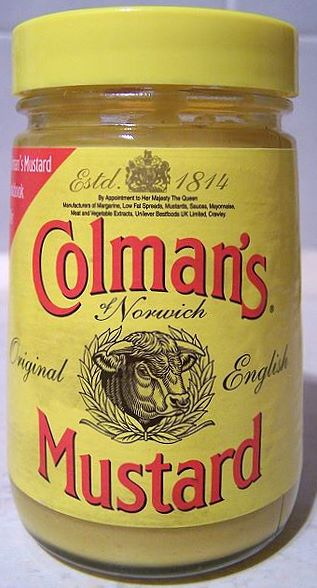
Unilever, suppliers of food and household products to Elizabeth II (shown on a jar of Colman's mustard)

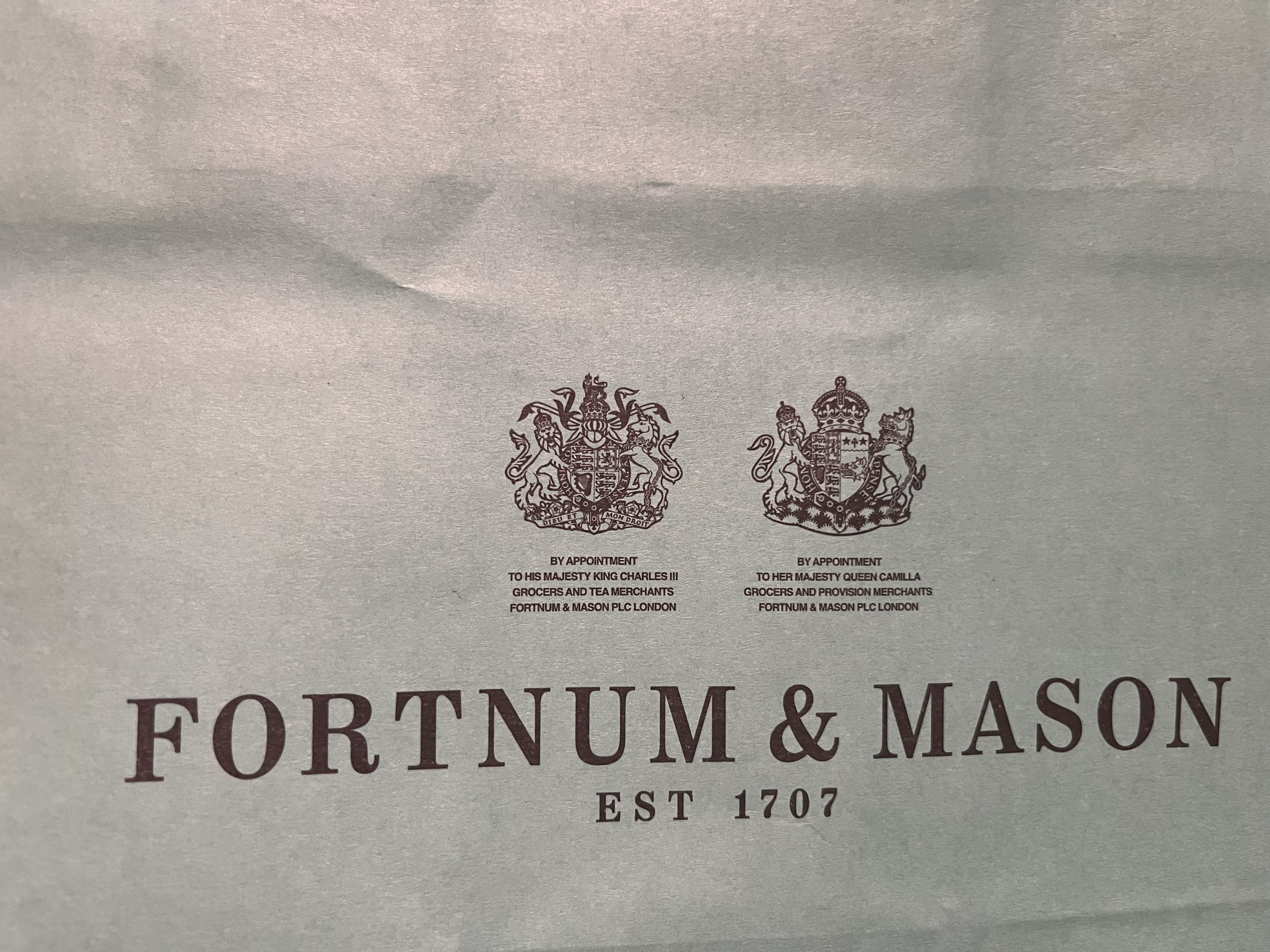
Fortnum & Mason, grocers and merchants to Charles III and Queen Camilla (photographed 2025)

== See also ==
- Brand management

== Bibliography ==
- Heald, Tim (1989). By Appointment: 150 Years of the Royal Warrant and Its Holders. Queen Anne Publisher. ISBN 0-356-17099-3.
