= Aynsley China =

British ceramics manufacturer

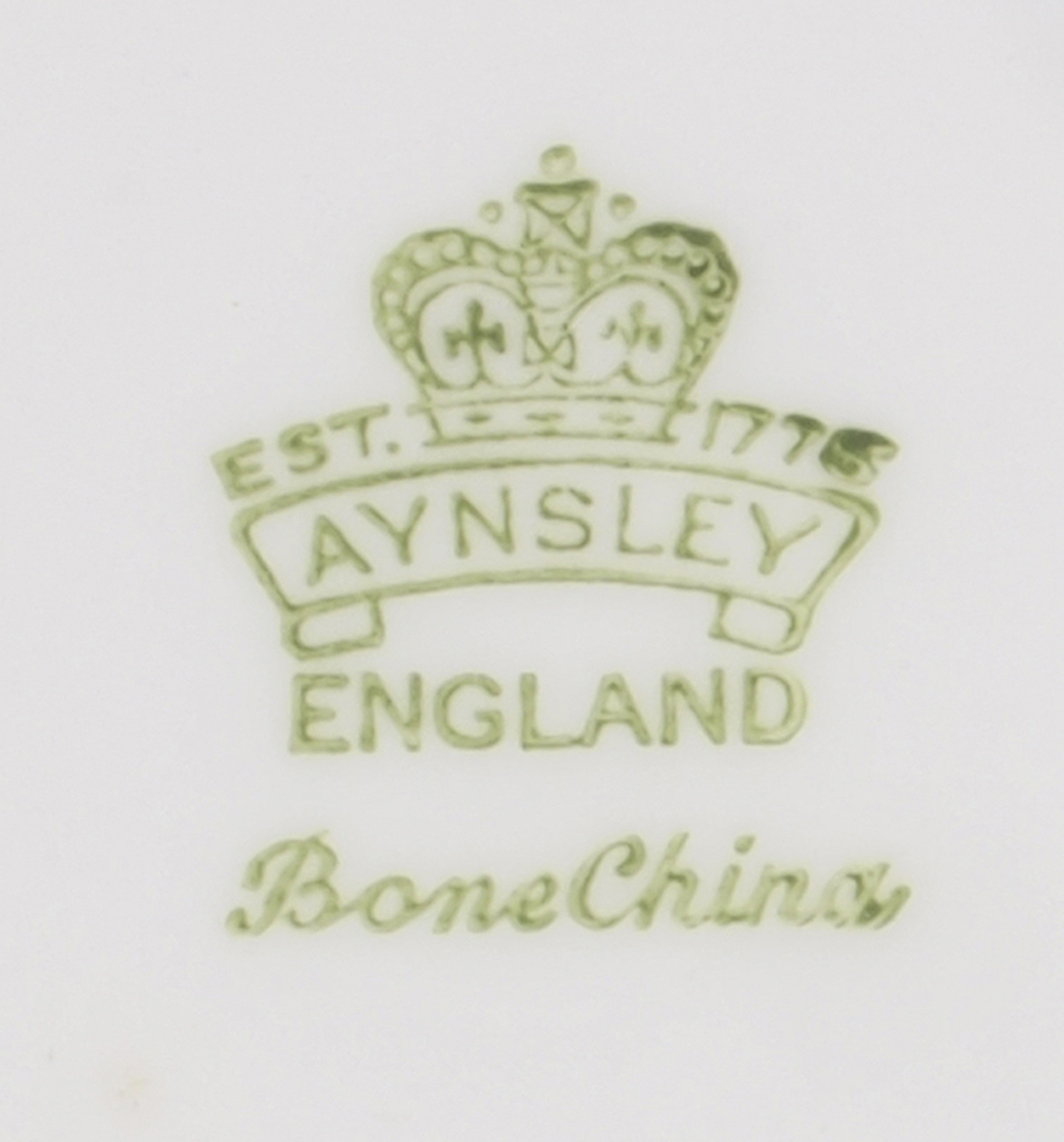
- Aynsley marking on rear of bone china plate.
- Industry: Bone china
- Founded: 1775
- Founder: John Aynsley
- Products: Tableware, giftware, commemorative items
- Parent: Belleek Pottery

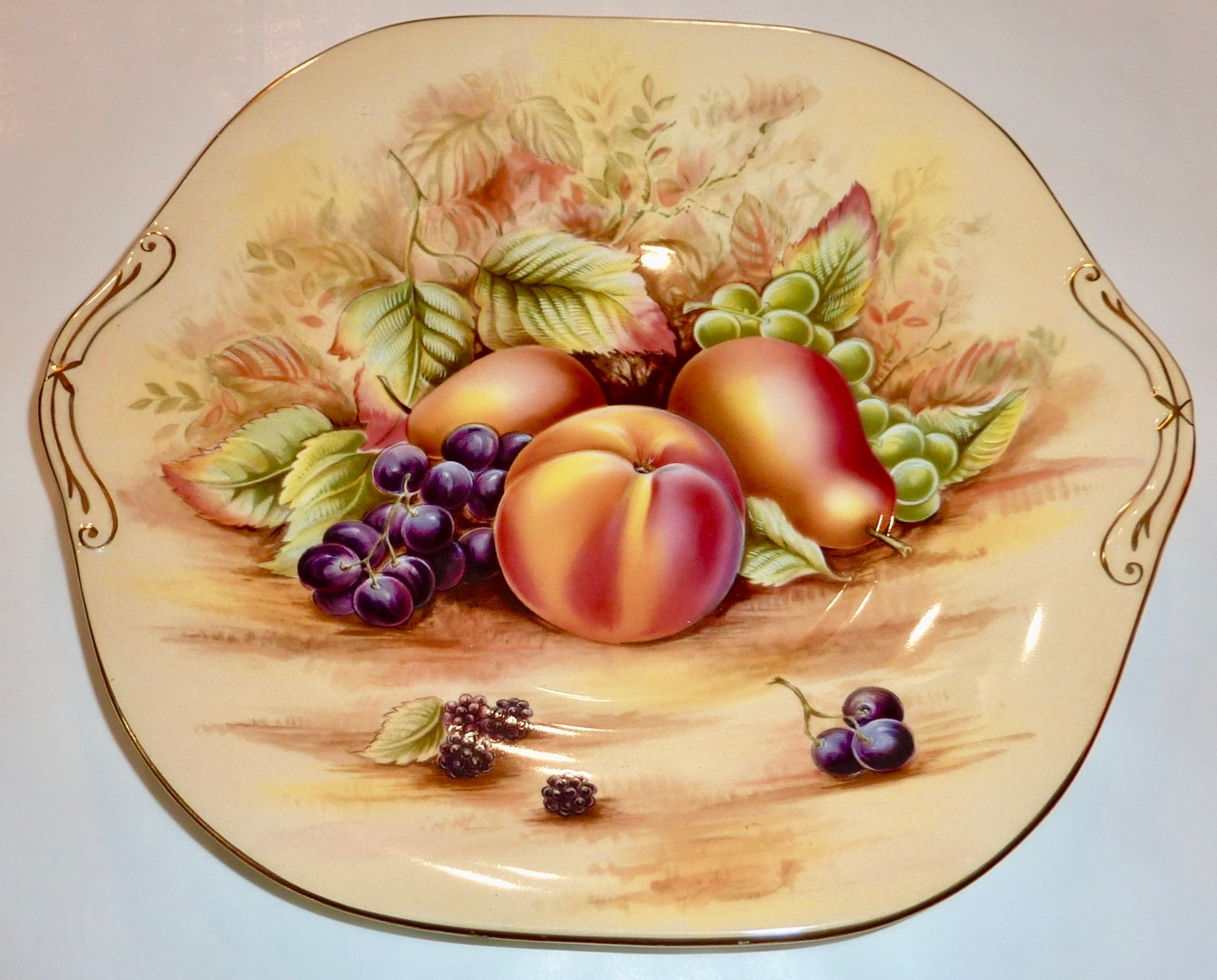
Aynsley "Orchard Gold" pattern dish, 20th century

Aynsley China Ltd. was a British manufacturer of bone china tableware, giftware and commemorative items.

== History ==
The company was founded in 1775 by John Aynsley in Lane End, Longton, Staffordshire. In 1861 his grandson John Aynsley built the historic Portland Works on Sutherland Road, Longton, Staffordshire. The company's profitability made it a desirable acquisition. In June 1970 Spode put in a bid, this was then topped in July by the Denby Pottery Company. Discussions then followed with Waterford Glass and a £1 million bid was agreed. In 1970 John Aynsley and Sons was taken over by Waterford and renamed Aynsley China Ltd. In 1987 Waterford sold the company in order to focus the group's fine china sales on the worldwide Wedgwood brand.

In May 1997, Aynsley China was acquired by The Belleek Pottery Group in Ireland. The company closed its Stoke-on-Trent factory in September 2014. As of July 2015 the factory shop is still open but its future is uncertain as the site is being advertised as for sale.

== Products ==
The company was a favoured supplier of the British royal family. Both Queen Elizabeth II and Diana, Princess of Wales, chose Aynsley china as wedding presents from the British china industry.

Aynsley's market has historically been within the United Kingdom.

== Bibliography ==
- Spink, Kathryn (1988). Invitation to a Royal Wedding. Random House.
- Digman, Lester (1995). Strategic Management Cases. DAMe Publications.
- Hands, David (2009). Vision and Value in Design Management. Bloomsbury.
