= St James' Church, Longton =

St James' Church
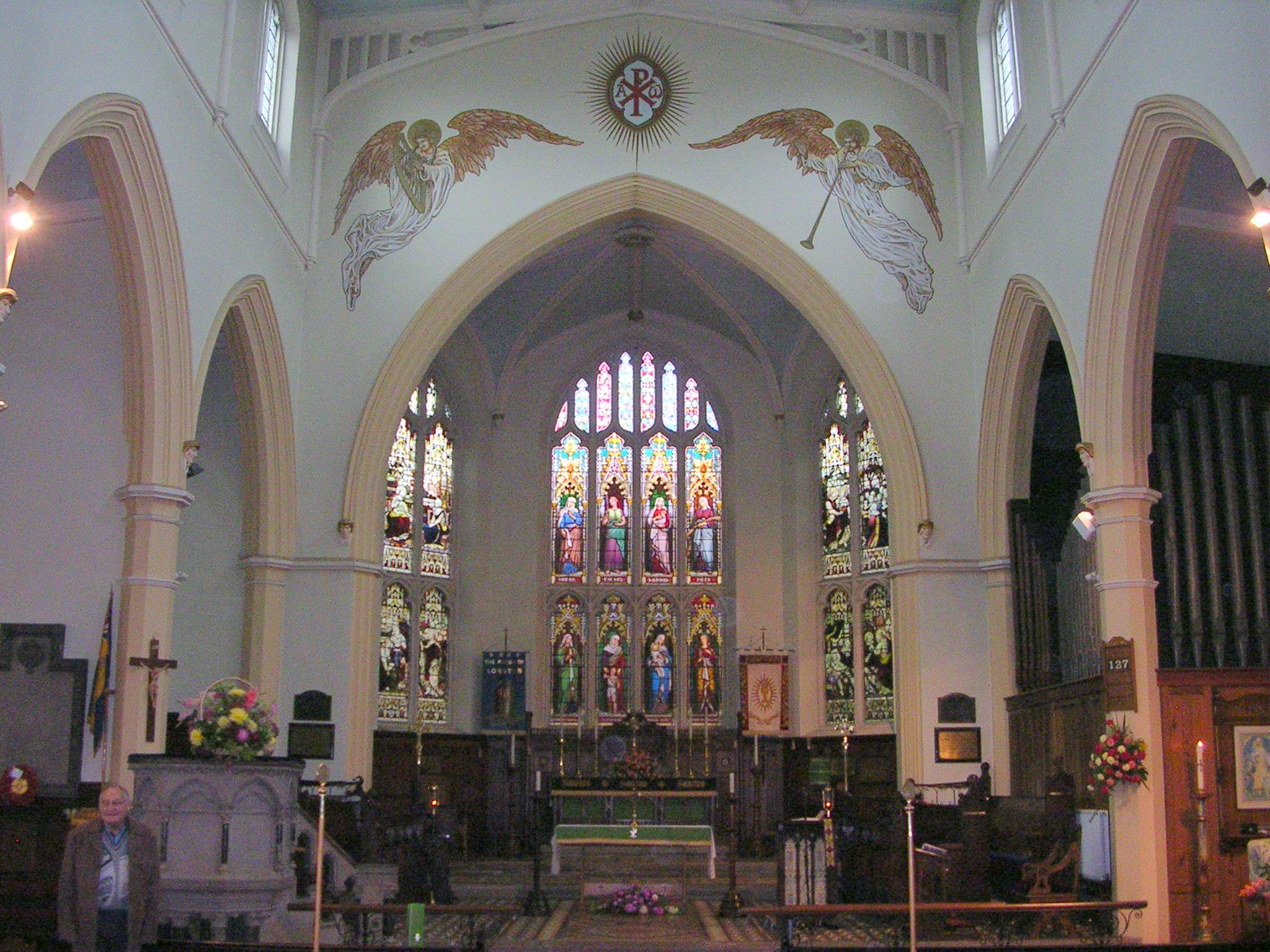
- Interior
- St James' Church
- 52°59′08″N 2°07′45″W
- OS grid reference: SJ 91438 43125
- Country: England
- Denomination: Church of England

History
- Status: Active

Architecture
- Heritage designation: Grade II listed

Administration
- Diocese: Diocese of Lichfield

The church of St James-the-Less is in Uttoxeter Road, Longton, Staffordshire, Stoke-on-Trent, England.

== History ==
St James-the-Less is a Commissioners' church which was built in 1833–4. It cost £10,000. With a capacity of 2000, it was intended to provide for the rapidly growing population of Longton. Other Commissioners' churches were built in the Staffordshire Potteries around the same time, for example, St Mark's, Shelton, which is slightly larger. Not long after the completion of St James', one writer suggested that its size was perhaps optimistic given the strength of Nonconformist denominations in the area. However, it is still an active parish church.

== Architecture ==
It is one of several Commissioners' churches designed by James Trubshaw. The church was built from Hollington sandstone with a west tower, six-bay nave and clerestory, and a short chancel with polygonal apse.

== Conservation ==
The church is a Grade II listed building. It is one of a number of buildings in Stoke-on-Trent which were listed in the 1990s after a survey identified scope for increasing the total (then relatively low for a city of its size). Another example is the church of the Holy Evangelists in Normacot.
