= Longton Town Hall =

Municipal building in Longton, Staffordshire, England

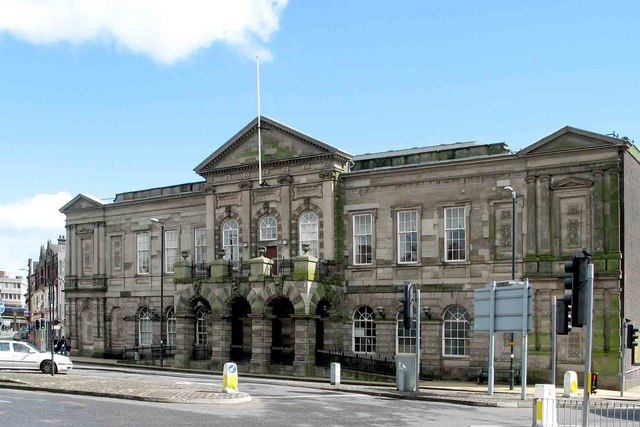
- Longton Town Hall

- Shown in Staffordshire
- 52.9893°N 2.1359°W
- Location: Times Square, Longton

History
- Built: 1844

Site notes
- Architect: John Burrill
- Architectural style: Neoclassical style

Listed Building – Grade II
- Official name: The Town Hall
- Designated: 17 April 1986
- Reference no.: 1297944

Longton Town Hall is a municipal building in Times Square, Longton, Staffordshire, England. The town hall, which was the meeting place of Longton Corporation, is a grade II listed building.

== History ==
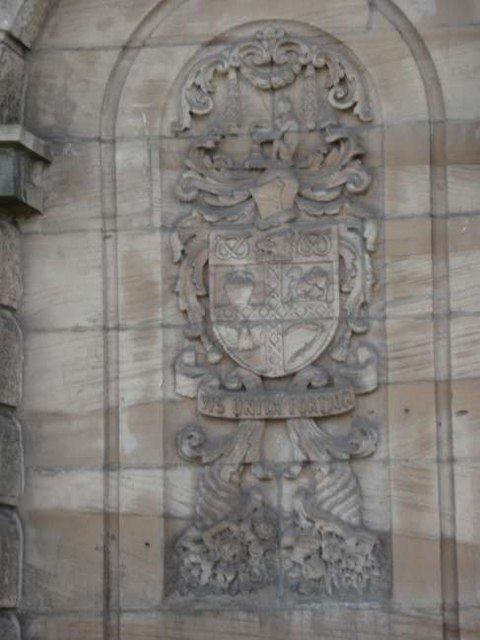
A carved panel on the face of the town hall showing the Stoke-on-Trent Borough coat of arms

The original building on the south side of Times Square, which was designed in the neoclassical style and built in ashlar stone, consisted of just seven bays (the east wing of the current structure) and was completed in 1844. Baptist Church services were held in the town hall from July 1853.

In anticipation of the area becoming a municipal borough in March 1865, civic leaders decided to expand the building: it was extended to the west by six extra bays to the designs of John Burrill with the works being completed later that year. The design of the expanded building involved a symmetrical main frontage with thirteen bays facing onto the Times Square with the end bays slightly projected forward as pavilions; the central section of three bays, which also projected forward, featured a porte-cochère on the ground floor supporting a balcony decorated with urns on pedestals; there were round headed carved panels flanked by Ionic order pilasters in the central bay on the first floor and an entablature and a pediment above. The carved panels, which filled all the bays on the first floor, and the keystones incorporating carvings of fish, fruit and flowers, which were placed in the arches of the porte-cochère, were all designed and carved by F. Godwin of Stoke-on-Trent. Internally, the principal room was the main hall which occupied the full width of the building.

The building continued to serve as a meeting place for Longton Corporation into the early 20th century but ceased to be local seat of government when the Federation of Stoke-on-Trent was formed in March 1910. An extension to the south, which created extra office space, was completed to a design by J. H. Beckett in 1912.

After the discovery of dry rot in the building in the mid-1980s, Stoke-on-Trent City Council decided to demolish the building. A shopkeeper, Ellis Bevan, started a local campaign group and organised a petition to preserve the building. Work on stripping the interior had already begun when Ellis obtained an injunction which temporarily halted the work. An inspector, who was sent to the town hall in April 1986, decided that the building should immediately be listed and the building was saved. The building was subsequently restored with some of the carved panels on the first floor being moved to the end bays on the ground floor and others being moved inside the building: the sash windows which replaced the panels created extra light in the building.

After a major programme of refurbishment works undertaken by G. F. Tomlinson at a cost of £1.8 million had been completed, the town hall was re-opened by Councillor Jackie Barnes as a local centre for Stoke-on-Trent City Council on 13 November 2019. The improvements included redecoration of the main staircase with ceramic tiles, the installation of meeting booths enabling customers to talk face-to-face with council officials and open plan offices for the council's communities and housing teams.
