= Freddie Jones =

English actor (1927–2019)

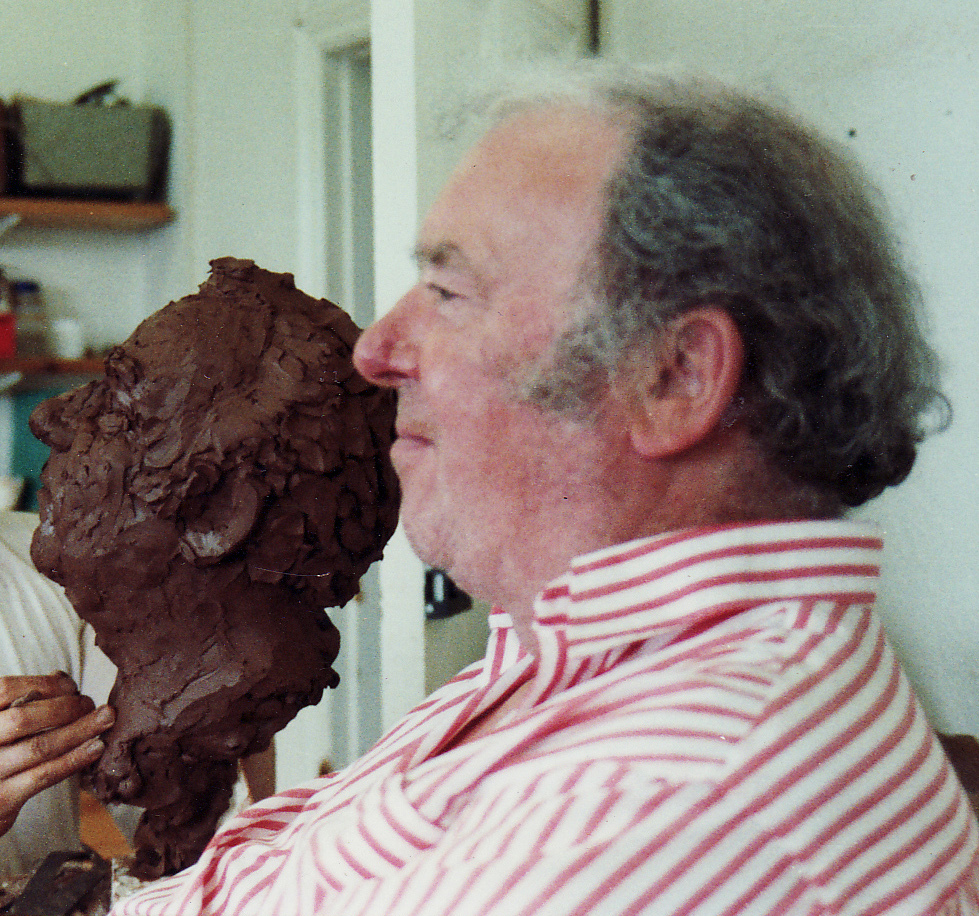
- Jones sitting for a sculpture by Steven Whyte in 2009
- Born: Frederick Charles Jones; 12 September 1927; Dresden, Staffordshire, England
- Died: 9 July 2019 (aged 91); Bicester, Oxfordshire, England
- Education: Rose Bruford College
- Occupation: Actor
- Years active: 1960–2018
- Spouse: Jennifer Heslewood (m. 1965)
- Children: 3, including Toby Jones

Frederick Charles Jones (12 September 1927 – 9 July 2019) was an English actor who had an extensive career in television, theatre and cinema productions for almost sixty years. In theatre, he originated the role of Sir in The Dresser; in film, he collaborated with David Lynch, starting with his role as a ruthless ringmaster Bytes in The Elephant Man (1980), starred in Firefox (1982); and in television, he played Sandy Thomas in the ITV soap opera Emmerdale from 2005 to 2018.

== Early life ==
Jones was born on 12 September 1927 in Dresden, a suburb of the town of Longton, Stoke-on-Trent, the son of Ida Elizabeth (née Goodwin) and Charles Edward Jones. Charles was a porcelain thrower, Ida a clerk and pub pianist. (Note: Jones's description of his mother's piano playing was: "She played piano in Longton the way most people play rugby, as though she had a grudge against it.") Freddie Jones worked briefly at Creda in Longton before he joined the British Ceramic Research Association in Penkhull, where he worked for ten years. His girlfriend at the time suggested he join a drama course, after which he joined rep in Shelton, Staffordshire, and other local theatre groups.

== Career ==
Jones won a scholarship to the Rose Bruford Training College of Speech and Drama—where he shed his Midlands accent. He spent time in repertory theatre in Lincoln, before making his London debut in 1962 with the Royal Shakespeare Company (RSC), performing at the Arts Theatre in Afore Night Come. According to the theatre critic Michael Coveney, Jones was "immediately one of the ... [RSC's] most distinctive character actors". In 1963 he played Stanley in the Harold Pinter-directed revival of The Birthday Party in 1963, followed by Maxim Gorky's play Lower Depths at the Aldwych Theatre in 1964. In 1964 he appeared as Cucurucu in the Peter Brook-directed production of Marat/Sade in a production that included Glenda Jackson, Ian Richardson and Patrick Magee. He reprised his role for the Broadway production, and again for the film version (1967).

He became more widely known to British audiences in 1968, after his appearance in the six-episode television series The Caesars, in which he played Claudius. For this role, he won the award for the "World's Best Television Actor of the Year" at the 1969 Monte-Carlo Television Festival. In 1970 he took the eponymous role in Charles Wood's television film The Emergence Of Anthony Purdy Esquire Farmer's Labourer, directed by Patrick Dromgoole for Harlech TV. Other television work included the 1968 BBC three-part adaptation of Cold Comfort Farm (he also appeared in the 1995 film adaptation), the 1978 series Pennies from Heaven and the ITV children's programme The Ghosts of Motley Hall (1976–1978). His cinema career developed, with support roles in the Cold War thriller Firefox playing an MI6 spy chief, and in the director David Lynch's films The Elephant Man (1980), starred alongside Clint Eastwood in Firefox (1982), Dune (1984) and Wild at Heart (1990). In the 1980s series, The District Nurse, he played the senior partner in a father-and-son medical practice in 1930s Wales, with the unrelated Nicholas Jones as his son.

In 1980 he appeared as Sir in Ronald Harwood's play The Dresser, first in Manchester, then transferring to the London stage; he later reprised the role on BBC Radio 4's The Monday Play in 1993. Coveney said of Jones in the role: "No subsequent performance in The Dresser – not Albert Finney in the 1983 film, nor Anthony Hopkins on television in 2015, nor Ken Stott in the West End in 2016 – matched the rumbling thunder of Jones". Apart from a brief spell in 2001, Jones retired from stage work in the early 1990s.

Jones had three appearances in Sherlock Holmes adaptations; as Chester Cragwitch in Young Sherlock Holmes (1985), as Inspector Baynes in the "Wisteria Lodge" episode of The Return of Sherlock Holmes (1988), and as a pedlar in "The Last Vampire" episode of The Case-Book of Sherlock Holmes (1993).

Jones played the character Sandy Thomas in ITV's Emmerdale from 2005 to 2018, when he left the programme. He said he had been offered a contract extension but he declined as he felt it was the right time to move on.

Jones also performed extensively in radio drama, including:

- "Mr. Pickwick" in the 1977 adaptation of Charles Dickens's The Pickwick Papers,
- "The Player" in the 1978 adaptation of Tom Stoppard's Rosencrantz and Guildenstern are Dead
- "The Waiter" in the 1971 adaptation of George Bernard Shaw's You Never Can Tell
- "Albert Edward, Prince of Wales" in Lydia Ragosin's Bertie
- "Rodin" in Jonathan Smith's Abandoned
- "The Scribe" in the 1992 adaptation of Bruce Bedford's The Gibson
- "Charlie" in A. L. Kennedy's Like An Angel
- "Sir Morton Makepeace" in Martyn Read's The Folly
- "The Artist" in the adaptations of the Gormenghast novels by Mervyn Peake.

== Personal life ==
Jones married actress Jennifer Heslewood in 1965. They had three sons, including Toby Jones. He was a Stoke City fan.

Jones died on 9 July 2019, aged 91, in Bicester, Oxfordshire, following a short illness. Following his death several of the cast members from Emmerdale paid tribute to Jones. On 11 July both episodes of a double-bill of the soap were dedicated to Jones.

== Filmography ==
=== Film ===
Jones's film credits
Year	Title	Role	Notes
1967	Accident	Man In Bell's Office	
1967	Marat/Sade	Cucurucu	
1967	Far from the Madding Crowd	Cainy Ball	
1968	The Bliss of Mrs. Blossom	Sergeant Dylan	
1968	Otley	Philip Proudfoot	
1969	Frankenstein Must Be Destroyed	Professor Richter	
1970	The Emergence of Anthony Purdy Esquire Farmer's Labourer	Anthony Purdy	
1970	The Man Who Haunted Himself	Dr. Harris, The Psychiatrist	
1970	Goodbye Gemini	David Curry	
1971	Assault	Reporter	
1971	Horatio Knibbles	The Gamekeeper	
1971	Kidnapped	Cluny	
1972	Antony and Cleopatra	Pompey	
1972	Sitting Target	MacNeil	
1973	The Satanic Rites of Dracula	Professor Keeley	
1974	Son of Dracula	The Baron	
1974	Juggernaut	Sidney Buckland	
1974	Vampira	Gilmore	A.K.A Old Dracula
1975	All Creatures Great and Small	Cranford	TV movie
1975	Romance with a Double Bass	Maestro Lakeyich	Short
1976	Never Too Young to Rock	Mr. Rockbottom	
1979	Zulu Dawn	Bishop Colenso	
1980	The Elephant Man	Bytes	
1982	Firefox	Kenneth Aubrey	
1982	Captain Stirrick	Mr. Leach	
1983	Krull	Ynyr	
1983	And the Ship Sails On	Orlando	
1984	Firestarter	Dr. Joseph Wanless	
1984	The Zany Adventures of Robin Hood	Orlando	TV movie
1984	Dune	Thufir Hawat	
1985	The Black Cauldron	Dallben	Voice
1985	Young Sherlock Holmes	Chester Cragwitch	
1986	Comrades	Vicar of Tolpuddle	
1987	Maschenka	Podtyagin	
1988	Consuming Passions	Graham Chumley	
1989	Erik the Viking	Harald, The Missionary	
1990	Wild at Heart	George Kovich	
1990	Dark River	The Official	TV movie
1991	The Last Butterfly	Karl Rheinberg	
1992	Spies Inc.	Filatov	
1993	The Mystery of Edwin Drood	Sapsea	
1994	Prince of Jutland	Bjorn	
1994	The Neverending Story 3: Escape from Fantasia	Mr. Coreander / Old Man of Wandering Mountain	
1995	Cold Comfort Farm	Adam Lambsbreath	TV movie
1997	Seeing Things	Prisoner Park	Short
1998	Keep in a Dry Place and Away from Children	Voice Over	Short
1998	What Rats Won't Do	Judge Foster	
1998	The Life and Crimes of William Palmer	Dr. Bamford	
1999	My Life So Far	Reverend Finlayson	
2000	House!	Mr. Anzani	
2000	Married 2 Malcolm	Jasper	
2000	David Copperfield	Barkis	TV movie
2002	The Count of Monte Cristo	Colonel Villefort	
2002	Puckoon	Sir John Meredith	
2004	Ladies in Lavender	Jan Pendered	
2005	The Libertine	Betterton	
2008	Caught in the Act	Collingsworth Jenkins	
2010	Come on Eileen	Dermot	
2015	By Our Selves	The Narrator	

=== Television ===
Jones's television credits
Year	Title	Role	Notes
1960	Androcles and the Lion	Christian	2 episodes
1963	Z-Cars	Craig	Episode: "Pay by Results"
1963	The Victorians	Maltby	Episode: "The Ticket-of-Leave Man"
1963	Maupassant	Boissel	Episode: "The Inheritance"
1963-1965	Our Man at St. Mark's	Benson / George Gregory	2 episodes
1964	Festival	Unknown	Episode: "Six Characters in Search of an Author"
1964	ITV Play of the Week	Arthur Lowe	Episode: "Gina"
1965	The Wednesday Play	Taylor	Episode: "For the West"
1966—1970	Mystery and Imagination	Sweeney Todd / Vaudin / Parkes	3 episodes
1967	Sword of Honour	Ludovic	Episode: "Officers and Gentlemen"
1967	The Avengers	Basil / John Steed	Episode: "Who's Who???"
1967	The Baron	The Landlord	Episode: "So Dark the Night"
1967	Half Hour Story	Walter Bishop	Episode: "A Man Inside"
1967-1973	Armchair Theatre	Fiodor Dostoyevski / John Dolby	2 episodes
1968	The Caesars	Claudius	5 episodes
1968	The Saint	Martin Graves	Episode: "The Time to Die"
1968	Nana	Count Muffat	5 episodes
1968	Cold Comfort Farm	Urk / Dr. Adolf Mudel	2 episodes
1969	ITV Playhouse	Wilfred Eames	Episode: "You've Made Your Bed: Now Lie in It"
1969	Randall and Hopkirk (Deceased)	James McAllister	Episode: "For the Girl Who Has Everything"
1970	The Importance of Anthony Purdy Esquire, Farmer's Labourer	Anthony Purdy	Television Film
1970	Germinal	Maheu	4 episodes
1970	The Great Inimitable Mr. Dickens	William Shaw	Television film
1970	Menace	Elystan Griffiths	Episode: "The Straight and the Narrow"
1970	The Main Chance	Professor Ian Allardyce	Episode: "The Walls of Jericho"
1970	BBC Play of the Month	Uncle Vanya	Episode: "Uncle Vanya"
1970-1971	Jackanory	The Storyteller	9 episodes
1971	Doctor at Large	Sir Robert Joyce	Episode: "Let's Start at the Beginning"
1971	Six Dates with Barker	Major Rupert Yappe	Episode: "1915: Lola"
1971	Out of the Unknown	Lester	Episode: "The Shattered Eye"
1971	The Misfit	Nitro	Episode: "On Paperback Revolutionaries"
1971	The Trouble with Lilian	Jack	Episode: "The Long Wash"
1971	For the Love of Ada	David Llewellyn Griffiths	Episode: "The Admirer"
1971	Jason King	Mr. Quirly	Episode: "A Deadly Line in Digits"
1972	The Goodies	Mr. Sparklipegs	Episode: "Charity Bounce"
1972	His and Hers	Tom Waller	Episode: "Driving"
1972	Love and Mr Lewisham	Mr. Chaffery	3 episodes
1973	The Adventurer	Calloway	Episode: "Mr. Calloway Is a Very Cautious Man"
1973	The Protectors	Robard	Episode: "The Bodyguards"
1973	Ooh La La!	General Irrigua	Episode: "Kept on a String"
1973	Bowler	The Festival Hall Manager	Episode: "On the Fiddle"
1973	Alice Through the Looking-Glass	Humpty Dumpty	Television film
1973	Fall of Eagles	Witte	2 episodes
1974	Baa Baa Black Sheep	Uncle Harry	Television film
1974	ITV Sunday Night Drama	Ethelred	Episode: "The Ceremony of Innocence"
1974	Marked Personal	George Prewett	2 episodes
1974	Play for Today	Joe Jones	Episode: "Joe's Ark"
1975	This Week	Lord Londonderry	Episode: "1844"
1975	Centre Play	Walter / "Tiny"	2 episodes
1975	A Journey to London	Lord Loverule	Television film
1975	Thriller	Arnold Tully	Episode: "A Midsummer Nightmare"
1975	The Boy Dave	Old Billy	Television film
1976	Shades of Greene	Lever	Episode: "A Chance for Mr. Lever"
1976	Space: 1999	Dr. Charles Logan	Episode: "Journey to Where"
1976	The Government Inspector	The Mayor	3 episodes
1976	Brensham People	Mr. Chorlton	Episode: "Master of Many Parts"
1976	Children of the Stones	Dai	5 episodes
1976–1978	The Ghosts of Motley Hall	Sir George Uproar	20 episodes
1977	Just William	Sandy Dick	Episode: "William and the Tramp"
1977	The Galton & Simpson Playhouse	Peter	Episode: "Cheers"
1977	Nicholas Nickleby	Mr. Vincent Crummles	2 episodes
1977	Duchess of Duke Street	Professor Stubbs	Episode: "Poor Catullus"
1977	Van der Valk	Joop Pater	Episode: "Accidental"
1977	Target	Chief Superintendent Neville Clegg	Episode: "Carve Up"
1978	Hazell	Dobson	Episode: "Hazell Settles the Accounts"
1978	The Mayor of Casterbridge	Fall	2 episodes
1978	The Nativity	Diomedes	Television film
1978	The Devil's Crown	Bertrand de Born	3 episodes
1978	Pennies From Heaven	The Headmaster	2 episodes
1978	Play for Today	Head Maltster, 'Audience'	Episode: "Sorry…"
1978	BBC Play of the Month	Gibbet	Episode: "The Beaux' Stratagem"
1978	BBC2 Play of the Week	Vollard	Episode: "Renoir, My Father"
1978	The Talking Parcel	Parrot	Voice, Television film
1978	The Dancing Princesses	King	Television film
1979	Strangers	Effingham	Episode: "Friends in High Places"
1979	The Strange Affair of Adelaide Harris	Selwyn Raven	5 episodes
1979	Of Mycenae and Men	Menelaus	Television short
1979	In Loving Memory	Jeremiah Unsworth	Episode: "In Loving Memory"
1979	Screenplay	Richard Morrison	Episode: "The Sound of Guns"
1979	Brecht and Co	Member of Brecht's Company / Azdak	Television film
1979	Secret Orchards	Roger Ackerley / Uncle Bodger	Television film
1980	The Greeks: A Journey in Space and Time	Socrates	3 episodes
1980	Spine Chillers	Reader	5 episodes
1981	Tiny Revolutions	Professor Jan Kalina	Television film
1981	Theatre Box	Nodding Dog	Voice, Episode: "Marmalade Atkins in Space"
1982	Murder Is Easy	Constable Reed	Television film
1982	Eleanor, First Lady of the World	Unknown	Television film
1983	A Small Desperation	Charles	Television film
1984	Travelling Man	Morgan Rees	Episode: "The Watcher"
1985	The Secret Diary of Adrian Mole	Mr. Scruton	4 episodes
1985	Bulman	Victor Garforth	Episode: "Another Part of the Jungle"
1985	Lost in London	Leo Porter	Television film
1985	Silas Marner: The Weaver of Raveloe	Squire Cass	Television film
1986-1990	Screen Two	Agejev / Ulick Uniake	2 episodes
1987	The District Nurse	Dr. Emlyn Isaacs	12 episodes
1987	Theatre Night	Engstrand	Episode: "Ghosts"
1987	Vanity Fair	Sir Pitt Crawley	7 episodes
1987	The Growing Pains of Adrian Mole	Mr. Scruton	6 episodes
1988	The Return of Sherlock Holmes	Inspector Baynes	Episode: "Wisteria Lodge"
1988	Room at the Bottom	Andre Shepherd	Episode: "The Chef"
1988	How to Be Cool	Dr. Benjamin Barnard Walters	3 episodes
1989	Sob Sisters	Leo	7 episodes
1989	Boon	David Tredegar	Episode: "Walking Off Air"
1990	TECX	Sir Neil Milverton	Episode: "A Soldier's Death"
1990	The Paper Man	Sir Charles Llewellyn	Miniseries
1990	Hale and Pace	Dr. Pratt	Episode: "Season Three, Episode Three"
1990	ScreenPlay	Politician	Episode: "Shoot the Revolution"
1991	Inspector Morse	Harry Field Senior	Episode: "Who Killed Harry Field?"
1992	Screen One	Old Squire	Episode: "Adam Bede"
1992	On the Air	Stan Tailings	Episode: "Episode 1.4"
1992	True Adventures of Christopher Columbus	Herald	
1993	Hotel Room	Lou Boca	Episode: "Tricks"
1993	Lovejoy	Arnold Tapie	Episode: "Goose Bumps"
1993	The Casebook of Sherlock Holmes	The Pedlar	Episode: "The Last Vampyre"
1993	Mr. Wroe's Virgins	Tobias	4 episodes
1993	The Young Indiana Jones Chronicles	"Birdy" Soames	Episode: "Young Indiana Jones and the Phantom Train of Doom"
1993–2009	Heartbeat	Howard Druce / Fred Braithwaite / George Woodford / Mr. Parrish	4 episodes
1994	A Pinch of Snuff	Dr. Gilbert Haggard	Television film
1994	Just William	Sir Giles Hampton	Episode: "William and the Great Actor"
1995	Cold Comfort Farm	Adam Lambsbreath	Television film
1995	Tales of Mystery and Imagination	Fortunato	Episode: "The Cask of Amontillado"
1996	No Bananas	Perce	2 episodes
1996	Neverwhere	The Earl	2 episodes
1996	The Bill	Arthur Gordon	Episode: "Old Codgers"
1997	Dalziel and Pascoe	French	Episode: "Ruling Passion"
1997	Drovers' Gold	"Moc" Morgan	Miniseries
1997	The Temptation of Franz Schubert	Unknown	Television film
1998	The Life and Crimes of William Palmer	Dr. Bamford	Television film
1998	Duck Patrol	Cyril	Episode: "The Spirit of the Deep"
1999	Sunburn	Mr. Dawson	Episode: "Episode #1.5"
1999	The Passion	George	
2000	David Copperfield	Barkis	Television film
2000	The League of Gentlemen	Dr. Magnus Purblind	Episode: "The League of Gentlemen Christmas Special"
2000	Casualty	Henry Wallowski	Episode: "Sympathy for the Devil"
2001	Randall & Hopkirk (Deceased)	Carodoc Evans	Episode: "Revenge of the Bog People"
2003	Broken Morning	The Undertaker	Television film
2004	The Royal	Sebastian Fox-Kirby	2 episodes
2004	Midsomer Murders	Benbow	Episode: "The Maid in Splendour"
2004	Casualty	Iain Roles	Episode: "Passions and Convictions"
2005	Casanova	Bragadin / Bragani	2 episodes
2005–2018	Emmerdale	Sandy Thomas	776 episodes (final appearance)
