= Margaret Sherratt Keys =

English-born American porcelain painter; store proprietor (1856–1942)

- Born: Margaret Jane Baines; 23 May 1856; Longton, England
- Died: October 13, 1942 (aged 86); Washington, D.C.
- Resting place: Rock Creek Cemetery
- Style: china painting
- Spouses: Samuel Sherratt; Marion H. Keys
- Awards: Medal, Woman's Department, Columbian Exposition

Margaret Sherratt Keys (née Baines; after first marriage, Sherratt; after second marriage, Keys; 1856–1942) was a British-born American artist and china painter; she was an examplar in the art of china painting and its many kindred phases. Keys was also the proprietor of Sherratt's China Art Store in Washington, D.C., the first porcelain art store in the city.

== Early life and education ==
Margaret Jane Baines was born in Longton, England, 23 May 1856. Her parents were Joseph and Hannah (Johnson) Baines.

Keys was educated at private school at Longton.

== Career ==
Keys and her first husband, Samuel Sherratt, learned the art of china painting in Staffordshire. They came to the U.S. in 1879, after a wide experience in England. Interested in the potteries of New Jersey and West Virginia, they lived in Wheeling, West Virginia, East Liverpool, Ohio, and Trenton, New Jersey. They remained in Trenton for nine years in the field of instructing amateurs the art of china painting. They became successful at this, their notability spreading beyond the city where their activities were then confined.

Recognizing Washington, D.C., as a better place for exhibiting their talents, the Sherratts moved there in 1889 and opened a studio. Washington had talented young artists who sought skilled instruction in the art of china painting. The classes that the Sherratt's offered grew, and china painting, till then a neglected field of study, quickly became a continuing endeavor among hundreds of aspiring artists. J. T. Baines, a nephew of Mrs. Keys, and one of their graduates in hand china painting, became associated with the firm for 12 years, and became an instructor in the decorating department.

Demand for hand-painted china, as well as products used in its preparation, grew steadily, and the Sherratt china art store was established and became a center point for thousands of patrons. As importers of china and materials for china decoration, and manufacturers of Sherratt's Roman gold, the establishment became widely known. In pace with its growing popularity, the store grew quickly and became one of Washington's noted showplaces of expert handiwork in china painting and its accessories. Large cases of delicately decorated Royal Worcester, Dresden Porcelain, and Belleek Pottery wares were scattered throughout the studio and inspired many amateur decorators who patronized the Sherratts. Directly above the sales rooms were the parlors where classes and private instruction were given daily in all branches of china decorating.

In 1893, Keys attracted nation-wide attention in decorative art circles, by the work she exhibited in the Woman's Department, Columbian Exposition, Chicago, and received their medal for best work in the line of decorated china.

Upon Mr. Sherratt's death in 1903, Keys became the controlling factor of their business. She was known throughout the U.S. as the manufacturer of Sherratt's Roman gold, an attractive product for embellishing china, with a quality superior to others in its day. This was Keys' exclusive product, supplied extensively to patrons through the U.S. and Canada. Art materials in large quantities were also in stock. Keys was the sole agent for Washington, D.C., and southern cities for the Revelation China Kiln, and this part of the enterprise grew greatly.

Keys was a member of the Washington Chamber of Commerce.

== Personal life ==
Her first marriage was to Samuel Sherratt (died 1903); the second was to Marion H. Keys, in June 1909.

Margaret Keys died in Washington, D.C. on October 13, 1942; interment was in Rock Creek Cemetery.

== Awards and honors ==
- 1893, Medal, Woman's Department, Columbian Exposition
