= Florence, Staffordshire =

Coordinates: 52.97°N 02.13°W

Florence
- Location within Staffordshire
- OS grid reference: SJ9142
- Unitary authority: Stoke-on-Trent
- Ceremonial county: Staffordshire
- Region: West Midlands
- Country: England
- Sovereign state: United Kingdom
- Post town: Stoke-on-Trent
- Postcode district: ST3
- Dialling code: 01782
- Police: Staffordshire
- Fire: Staffordshire
- Ambulance: West Midlands
- UK Parliament: Stoke-on-Trent South

Florence is a suburb of Stoke-on-Trent, in the Stoke-on-Trent district, in the ceremonial county of Staffordshire, England. It is near Meir. Florence Colliery was built in 1874, and demolished in 1994. Coal from the colliery was used in the final firing of a Bottle oven.

Florence became a civil parish in 1894, being formed from the part of Trentham parish in Longton Municipal Borough. On 1 April 1896 the parish was abolished and merged with Longton.
