= John Aynsley =

British artist (1823-1907)

- Born: 1823
- Died: 7 February 1907 (aged 83–84)

John Aynsley (1823 – 7 February 1907) was an English potter who established the Portland Works in Longton, Staffordshire.

== Biography ==
John Aynsley's family had been producing fine bone china since 1775. He was born in Longton, Staffordshire in 1823 to James Aynsley and Charlotte née Anderson. He received some education in a dame school. Because of the family circumstances Aynsley was forced to begin work at the age of nine, for two-pence a day. He later had three jobs at three different factories working up to sixteen hours per day.

In 1848 he moved to Derby to find new employment, but subsequently returned to Staffordshire, becoming a business partner with Sampson Bridgwood. In 1861, Aynsley built Portland Works in Longton, in a classic styles with a pedimented gable.

In 1865, Aynsley was elected to Longton council. In 1886, he was elected as mayor of the town for a four-year period.

Aynsley died at Portland House, Blythe Bridge, on 7 February 1907.
