= Ramsay Traquair =

Scottish palaeontologist (1840–1912)

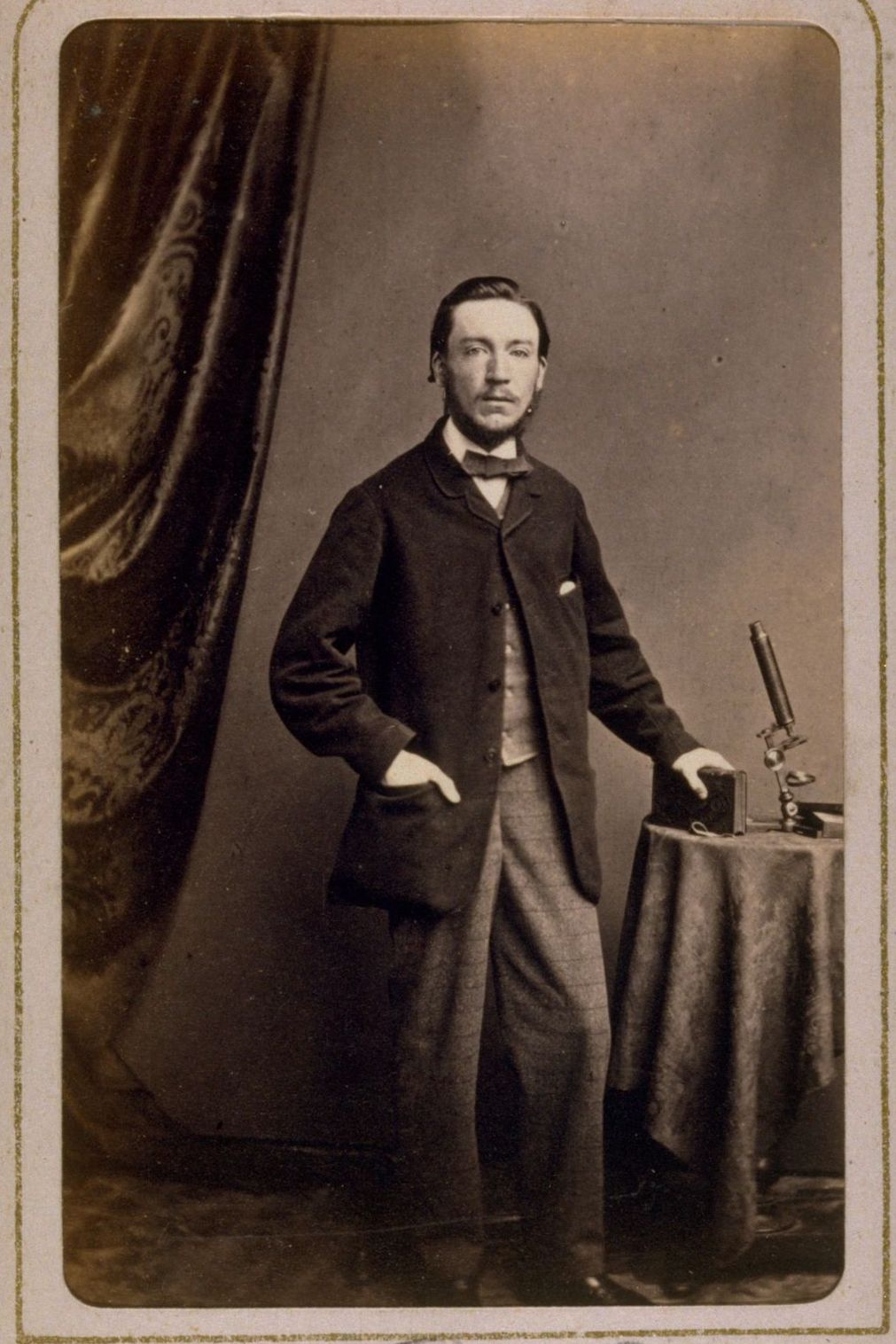
Ramsay Traquair in 1865

Ramsay Heatley Traquair FRSE FRS (30 July 1840 – 22 November 1912) was a Scottish naturalist and palaeontologist who became a leading expert on fossil fish.

Traquair trained as a medical doctor, but his thesis was on aspects of fish anatomy. He held posts as Professor of Natural History and Professor of Zoology in England and Ireland, before returning to his native Edinburgh to take up a post at the Museum of Science and Art. He spent the remainder of his career at the Museum building up a renowned collection of fossil fish over a period of more than three decades.

He published extensively on palaeoichthyology, authoring many papers and a series of monographs. His studies of rocks and fossils in Scotland overturned earlier work on fossil fish, establishing new taxonomic classifications. His honours included fellowships from a range of learned societies, including the Royal Society of Edinburgh, the Royal Society of London, and the Geological Society of London. Among his awards for his work on fossil fish are the Lyell Medal and the Royal Medal.

== Early life ==
Ramsay Heatley Traquair was born on 30 July 1840 in the manse at Rhynd, Perthshire, Scotland the youngest of the eight children of Elizabeth Mary Bayley (1800-1843) and the Rev James Traquair. His father was a Church of Scotland clergyman originally from Lasswade.

The family moved to 10 Duncan Street in south Edinburgh when his father retired, soon after Traquair's birth. Traquair attended preparatory school, followed by further schooling at the Edinburgh Institution. From 1857, he studied medicine and later fish anatomy at the University of Edinburgh graduating with a degree in medicine in August 1862. He was presented with a gold medal for his MD thesis on flatfish, on the "Asymmetry of the Pleuronectidae". The anatomists he studied and worked with at the University included John Goodsir and William Turner.

== Career ==
Traquair initially stayed on at the University of Edinburgh, working as an anatomy demonstrator from 1863 to 1866. He then took up the post of Professor of Natural History at the Royal Agricultural College in Cirencester. This appointment included a testimonial from T. H. Huxley, however Traquair's stay at Cirencester was brief as he felt that "this post isolated him from research".

Moving to Dublin, Ireland, in 1867, Traquair took up the position of Professor of Zoology at the Royal College of Science, working and teaching there for six years. This was a government position, with the appointment being made by the "Lords of the Committee of Council on Education". One of the honours accorded him during this period was his election in 1871 to the Royal Irish Academy. On 5 June 1873 he married the artist Phoebe Anna Moss (Phoebe Anna Traquair), whom he had met in Dublin. They moved to Colinton Farm in the south-west of Edinburgh. They had three children: Ramsay (1874); Henry (Harry) Moss (1875); and Hilda (1879). That same year, Traquair was transferred (again by the government) to Edinburgh to become the first Keeper of the Natural History Collections at the Museum of Science and Art (later the Royal Scottish Museum). This position had been created by the government to ensure that the museum collections remained independent rather than under the control of the University of Edinburgh's Professor of Natural History, Wyville Thomson.

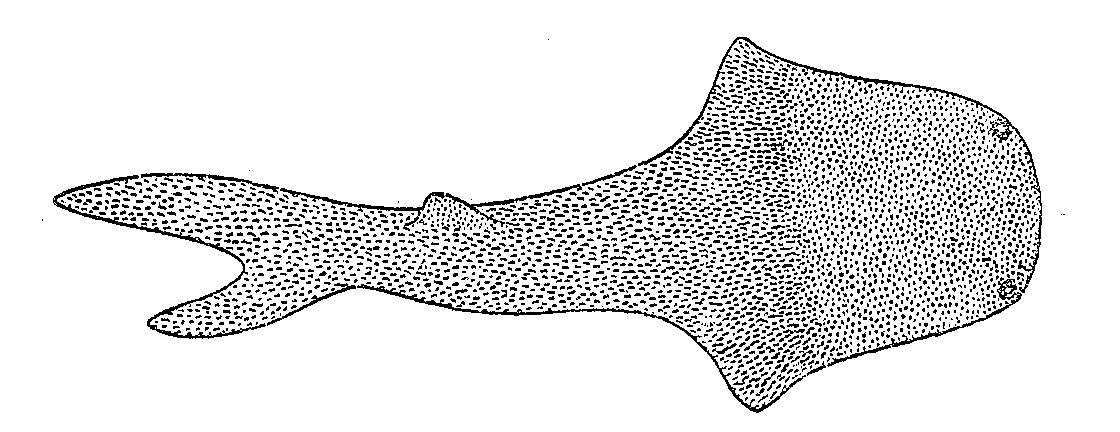
Loganellia scotica (Traquair, 1898), drawn by Traquair

Traquair would spend the next 33 years working in Edinburgh in charge of the museum's natural history collections, building up a large collection of fossil fish. One of the locations where Traquair carried out work on fossil fish was the gorge of Dura Den, in Fife, Scotland, and his collection from here and elsewhere was considered one of the finest in the world at the time. The deposits that he studied included the Old Red Sandstone and the Carboniferous rocks of Scotland. Fossil fish that he classified included the Palaeoniscidae and the Platysomidae, overturning earlier work by Louis Agassiz. Much of this work was published over a period of some 37 years as a series of monographs from the Palaeontographical Society, with some parts being published posthumously.

In 1881, Traquair was elected a Fellow of the Royal Society of London. He was also a visiting lecturer at the Natural History Museum in London (then part of the British Museum), twice being appointed 'Swiney Lecturer on Geology at the British Museum (Natural History)' for two five-year periods, from 1883 to 1887 and then again from 1896 to 1900. Traquair was also a Fellow of the Royal Society of Edinburgh and a Fellow of the Geological Society of London. He was elected a Fellow of the Royal Society of Edinburgh in 1874, also serving several periods as Councillor, and being a Vice-President of the Society from 1904 to 1910. He was elected to the Geological Society of London in 1874.

== Family ==
Traquair was married to the artist Phoebe Anna Traquair (née Moss) and they had two sons and a daughter, Ramsay, Henry (Harry) Moss, and Hilda. Ramsay became an architect and Harry an ophthalmic surgeon in Edinburgh.

== Awards and honours ==
Traquair received the 1881 award from the Wollaston Fund, and in 1901 was awarded the Lyell Medal, both from the Geological Society of London. Other awards included the triennial Neill Prize (1874–77) and the biennial Makdougall-Brisbane Prize (1898–1900), both from the Royal Society of Edinburgh. Traquair was awarded an honorary LLD from the University of Edinburghin 1893. In 1907 he received the Royal Medal of the Royal Society. The Royal Medal citation was "On the ground of his discoveries relating to fossil fishes". In 1909, Traquair's life and career was documented in the 'Eminent Living Geologists' feature of the Geological Magazine.

== Later years ==
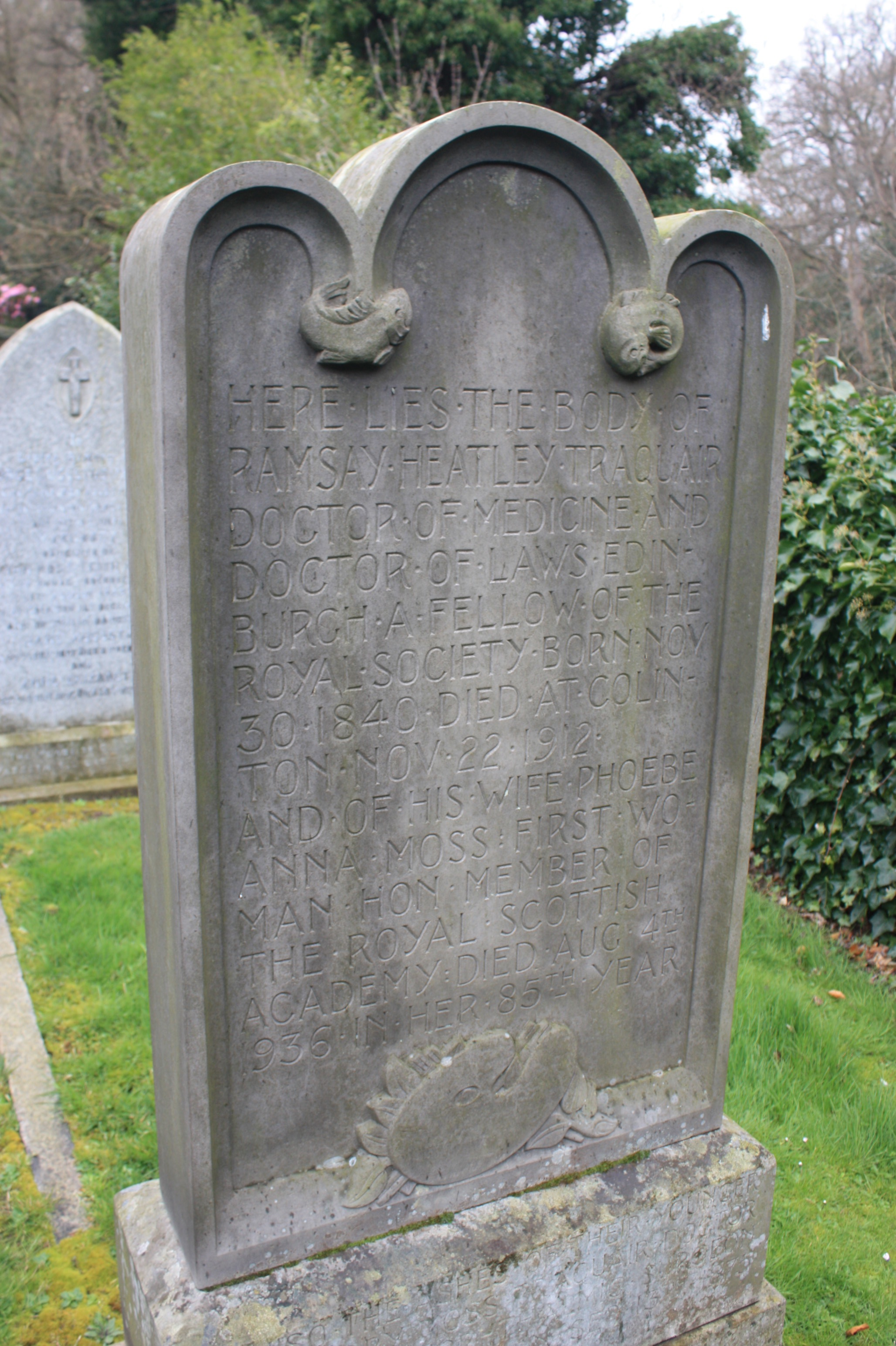
Ramsay Traquair's grave, Colinton churchyard, Edinburgh

Traquair retired in 1906 to "The Bush" in the Edinburgh suburb of Colinton. He died on 22 November 1912, at the age of 72, survived by his wife and three children. He is buried in the graveyard at Colinton Parish Church, with his grave marked by a headstone designed by his wife and carved by Pilkington Jackson. Obituaries and memorial notices and articles were published in the Glasgow Herald, as well as a range of scientific journals. His wife was later buried with him, as were the ashes of his son Harry.
