= Phoebe Anna Traquair =

Irish artist

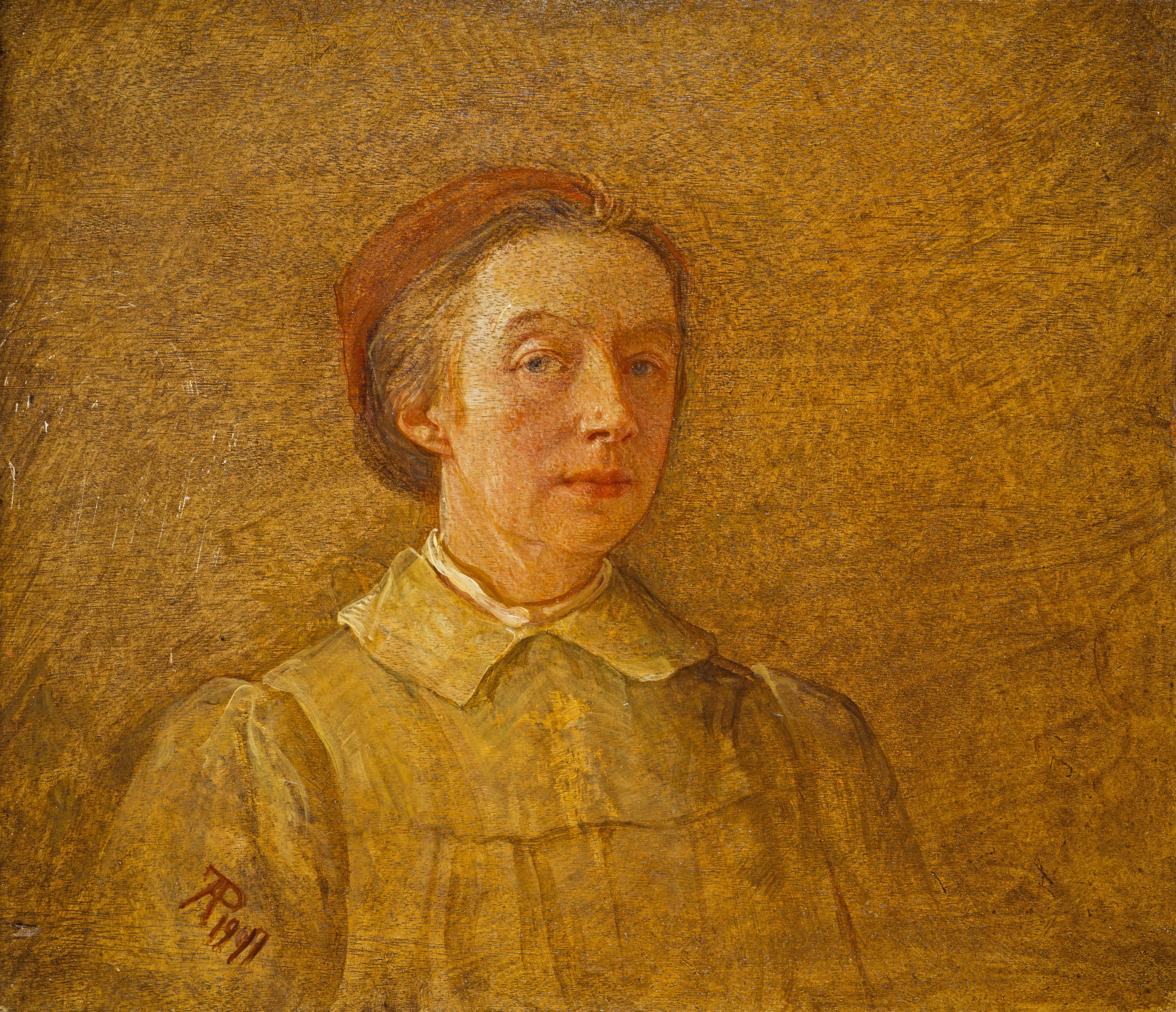
- Phoebe Traquair, self-portrait, 1911
- Born: Phoebe Anna Moss; 24 May 1852; Kilternan, County Dublin, Ireland
- Died: 4 August 1936 (aged 84); Edinburgh, Scotland, UK
- Education: School of Design of the Royal Dublin Society
- Known for: murals, embroidery, jewellery, enameling, and book illuminations
- Spouse: Ramsay Heatley Traquair

Phoebe Anna Traquair (/trəˈkwɛər/; 24 May 1852 – 4 August 1936) was an Irish-born artist, who achieved international recognition for her role in the Arts and Crafts movement in Scotland, as an illustrator, painter and embroiderer. Her works included large-scale murals, embroidery, enamel jewellery and book illuminations. In 1920, she was elected as an honorary member of the Royal Scottish Academy.

== Family life ==
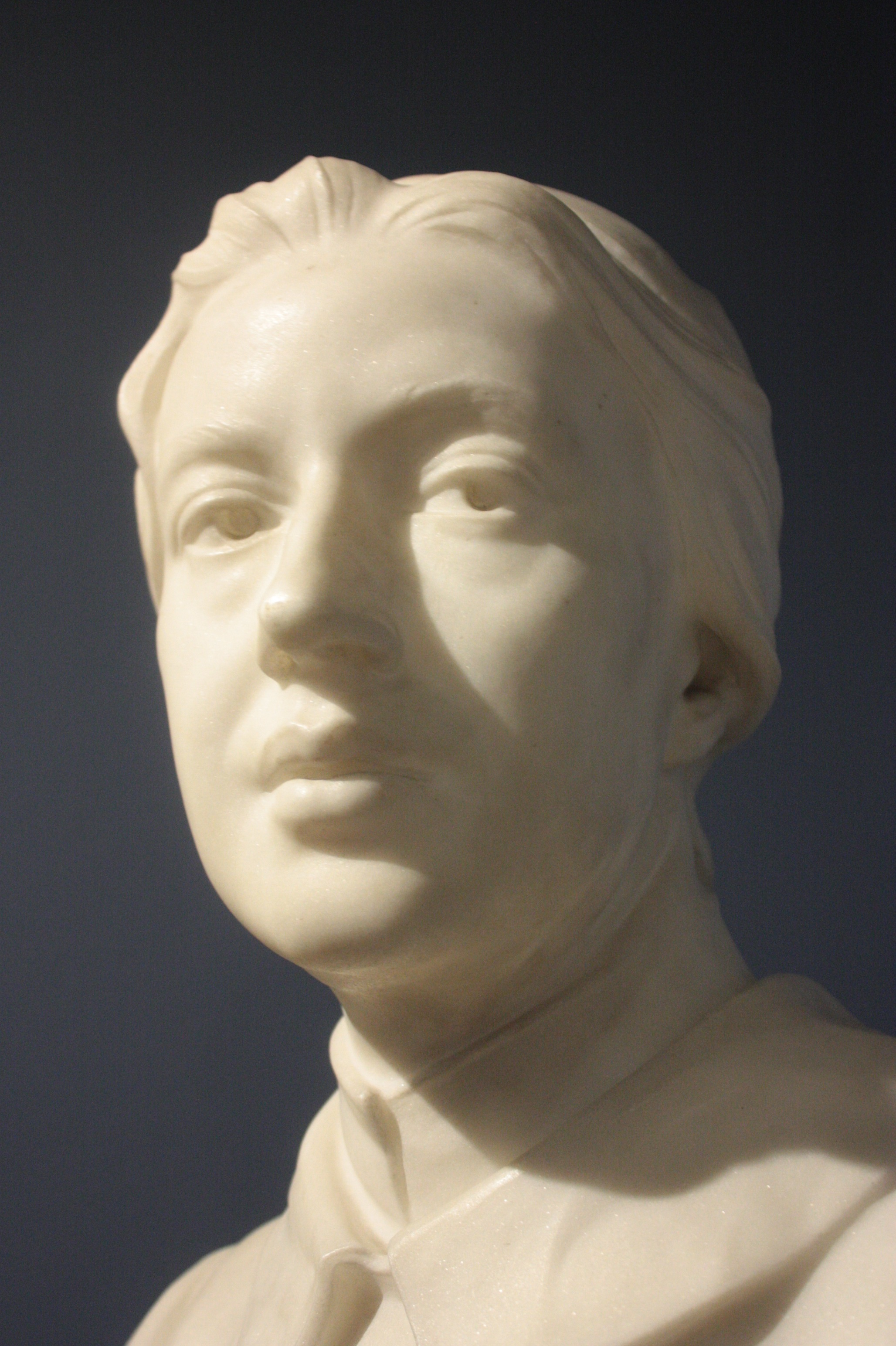
Phoebe Traquair by Peter Induni, 1927, Scottish National Portrait Gallery

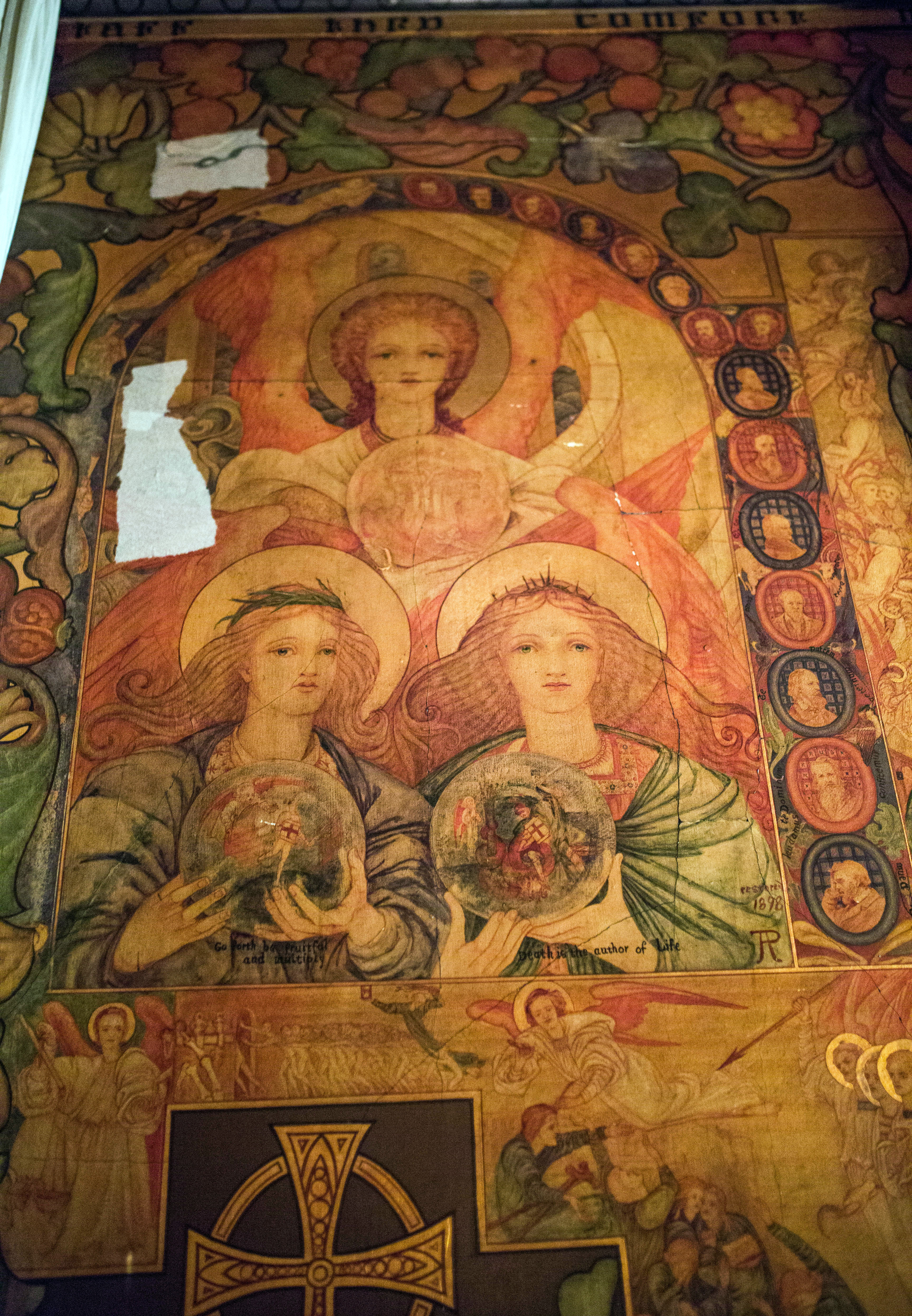
Royal Hospital for Sick Children, Mortuary Chapel Murals, Edinburgh

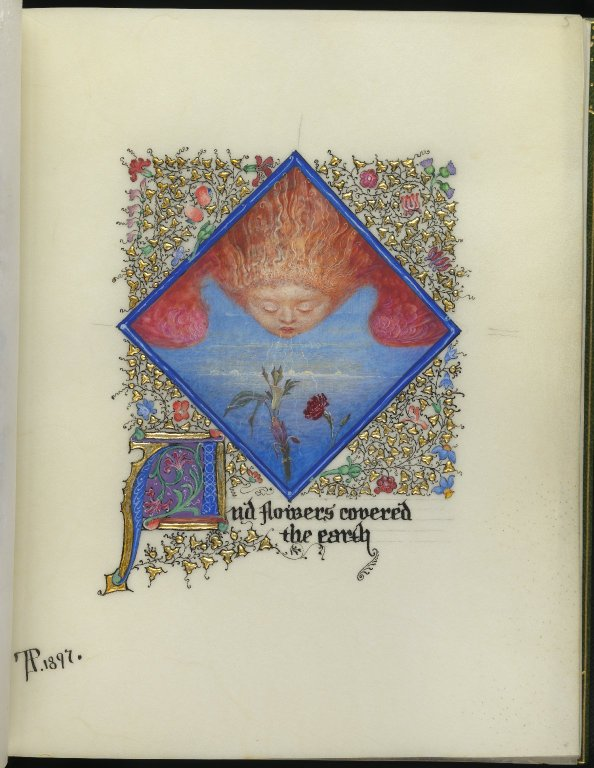
A page from Collection of Reproductions of Medallions by Phobe Anna Traquair

Phoebe Traquair was born Phoebe Anna Moss on 24 May 1852 in Kilternan, County Dublin. Her parents were physician Dr William Moss and Teresa Moss (née Richardson). Phoebe was the sixth of their seven children. Traquair studied art at the School of Design of the Royal Dublin Society between 1869 and 1872. She married the Scottish palaeontologist Ramsay Heatley Traquair on 5 June 1873. The couple moved to Edinburgh in spring 1874. Some of her work was palaeontological drawings related to her husband's research on fossil fish, and these drawings are held in the special library collections of National Museums Scotland. Their children were Ramsay, Harry and Hilda.

Phoebe's elder brother was William Richardson Moss, a keen art collector who owned a number of works by Dante Gabriel Rossetti. Traquair shared with her brother this love of art, including a particular fascination with the work of Rossetti and that of William Blake, and her style and choice of subject matter remained deeply influenced by Blake and Rossetti's art and poetry throughout her life.

=== Royal Hospital for Sick Children ===
During 1885 and 1886, Traquair created a series of murals for the Mortuary Chapel of the Royal Hospital for Sick Children, Edinburgh. The mural is of Three Maidens (Divine Powers) which is bordered by images within lunettes of writers, artists and critics, such as Edward Burne-Jones, William Bell Scott, Noel Paton and John Ruskin, who was a considerable influence on Traquair. This was her first work as a professional artist. The mortuary was a small windowless room, formerly a coalhouse, where bodies could be left "reverently and lovingly" prior to burial. The work was completed in 1886 and before the building was further developed in 1894, the murals were transferred to a new site and Traquair restored and installed them, albeit in a simpler composition, between 1896 and 1898.

=== St Mary's Cathedral ===
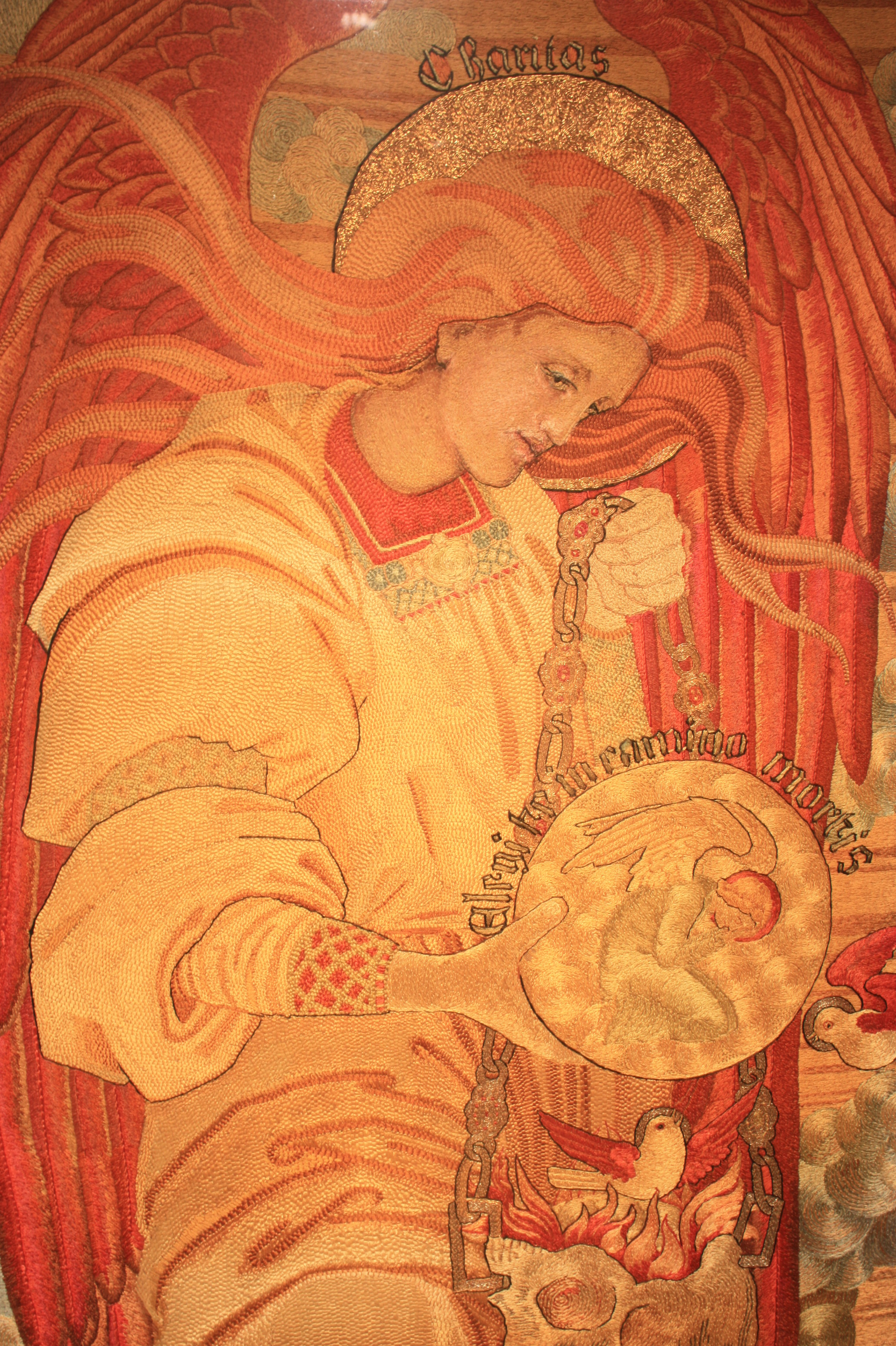
Salvation of Mankind (detail), 1886 to 1893

Her murals of the song school of St Mary's Cathedral (1888–92) won Traquair national recognition. Within a tunnel-vaulted interior, the east wall depicts the cathedral clergy and choir. The south wall depicts Traquair's admired contemporaries such as Dante Gabriel Rossetti, William Holman Hunt, and George Frederic Watts. On the north wall birds and choristers sing together, and the west wall shows the four beasts singing the Sanctus. She also made a book containing reproductions of the medallions on the borders of the wall accompanied with handwritten text. The Song School is still used daily for practice by the Choristers.

=== Mansfield Place Church ===
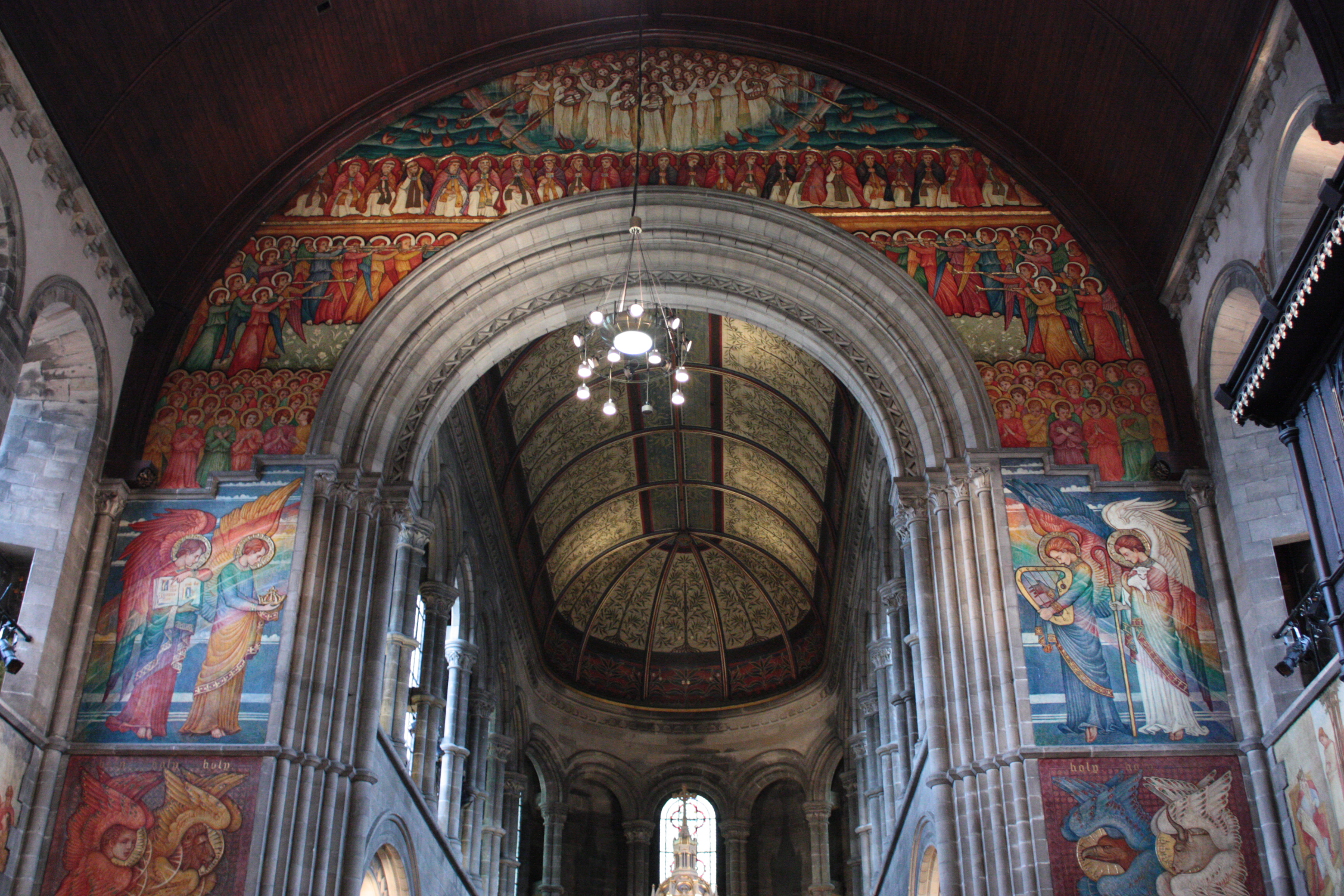
Catholic Apostolic Church murals, Edinburgh (east end)

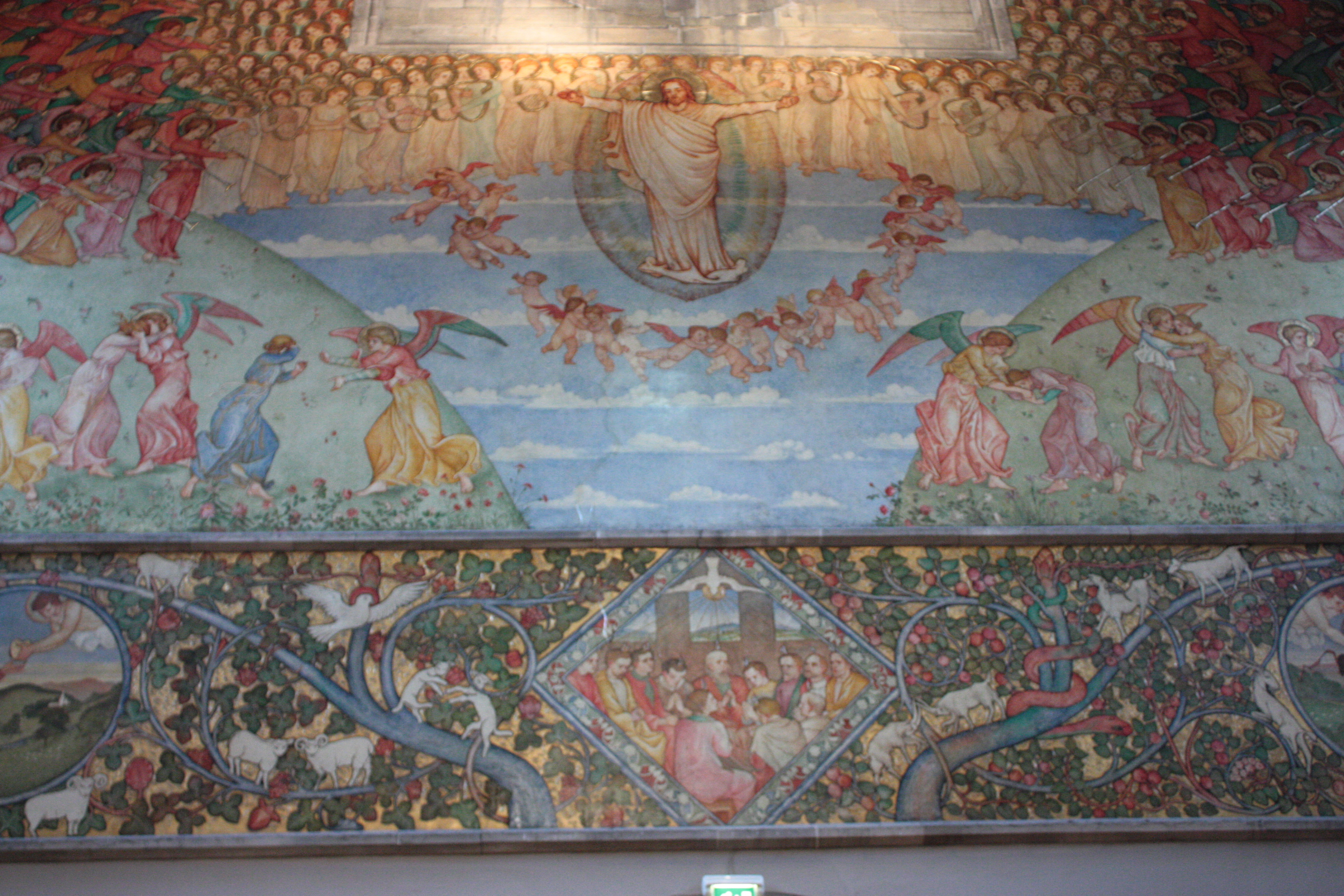
Catholic Apostolic Church murals, Edinburgh (west end)

Traquair's best-known work is in the vast former Catholic Apostolic Church (1893–1901) on Mansfield Place (now called the Mansfield Traquair Centre) at the foot of Broughton Street, which has been called "Edinburgh’s Sistine Chapel", and "a jewelled crown". It was this work which "helped to confirm her international recognition."

=== Other works ===
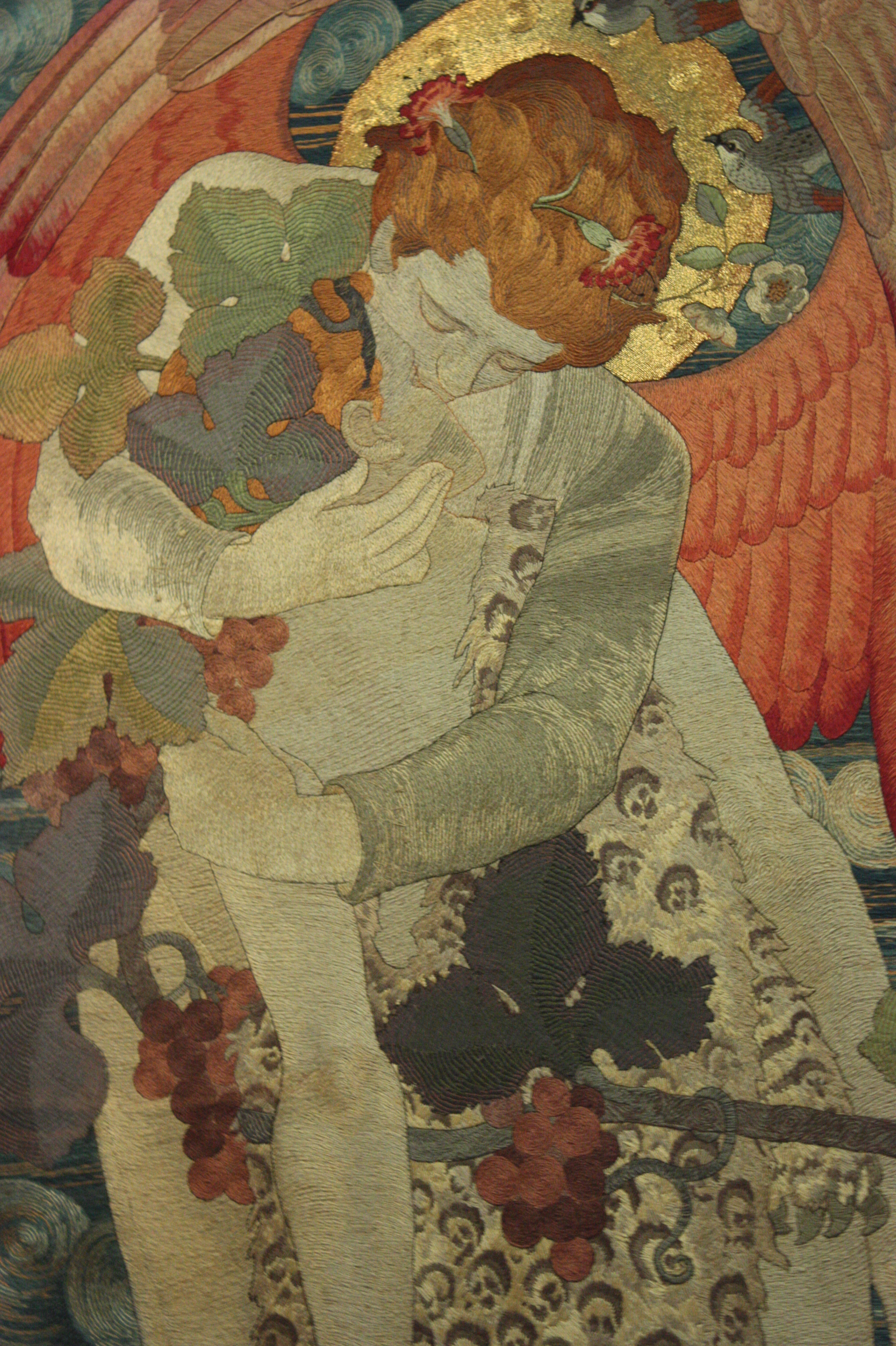
Detail from 'The Victory', the last of four embroideries in the series 'The Progress of a Soul'

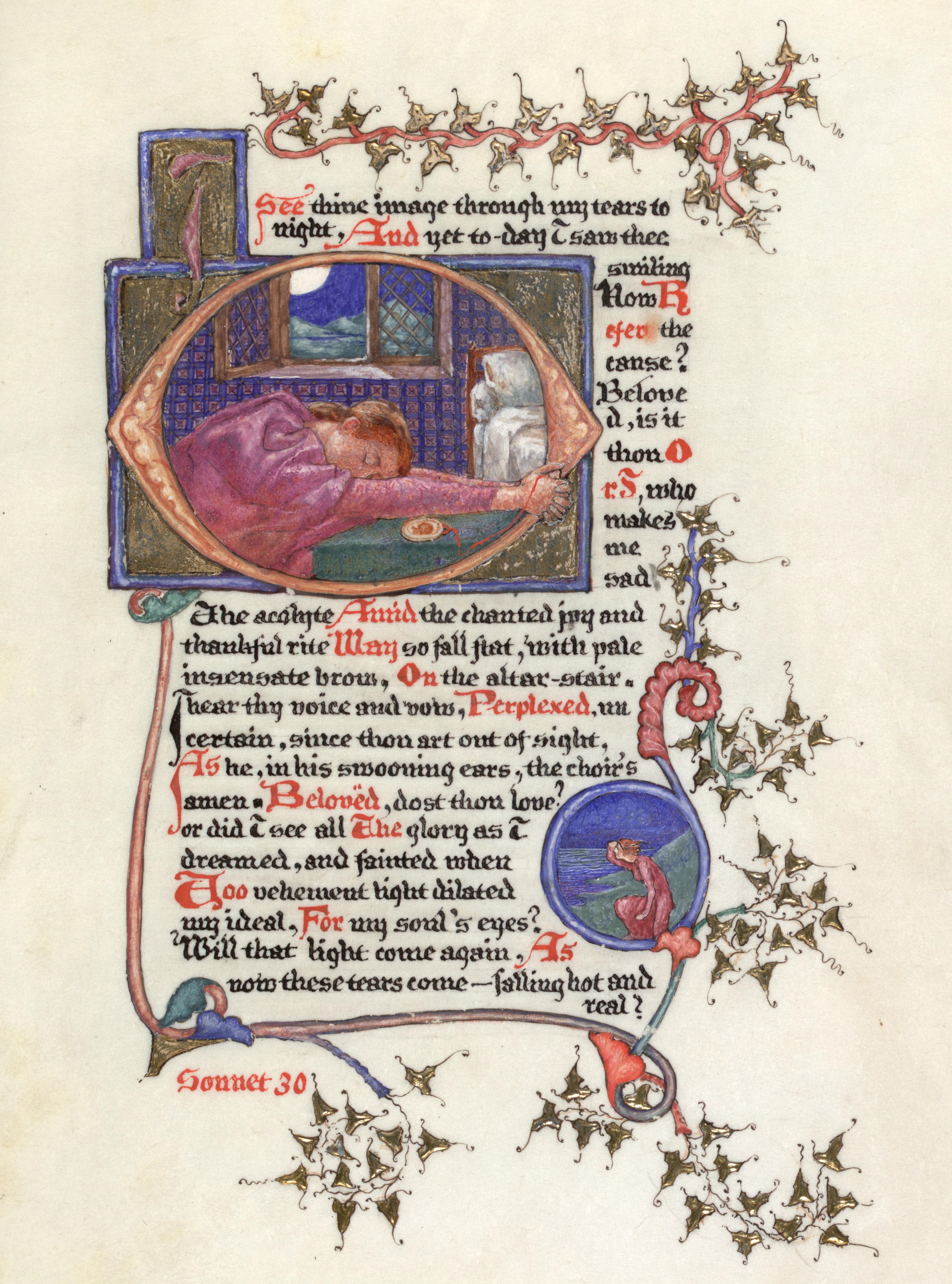
Illuminated image in Elizabeth Barrett Browning’s Sonnets from the Portuguese – Sonnet 30

A work by Traquair is in the Thistle Chapel of St Giles Cathedral where she designed the earliest enamel armorial panels over the knights' seats. Another of her works is a key Arts and Crafts illuminated manuscript of Sonnets from the Portuguese by the Victorian poet Elizabeth Barrett Browning, which is held by the National Library of Scotland. Traquair was a prolific artist who, as well as her murals and embroidery, produced hundreds of pieces of jewellery. She was invited to exhibit at the World's Fair in Chicago in 1893, and her four silk-embroidered panels The Progress of the Soul were displayed in St. Louis in 1904. That year she returned to mural painting with a work for the chancel of St Peter's Church, Clayworth in Nottinghamshire. Her final mural was completed for the Manners family chapel at Thorney Hill in the New Forest between 1920 and 1922. Many other works by Traquair, including: enamels; illuminated manuscripts of Rossetti's sonnet sequence "Willowwood;" a piano with a case made by Traquair's friend and artistic collaborator Robert Lorimer and painted with scenes from "Willowwood," the Biblical Song of Songs, and the story of Psyche and Pan; and a triptych of embroideries based on the story of the Redcrosse Knight from Edmund Spenser's The Faerie Queene, are on display at National Museums Scotland in Edinburgh.

At Kellie Castle in Fife in 1897, Traquair completed the Painted Panel above the fireplace in the castle's Drawing Room. The painting is based on Botticelli's "primavera" and was completed when John Henry Lorimer occupied the Castle. The painting was covered over in the late 1940s but was restored in 1996 by the National Trust for Scotland.

== Death ==
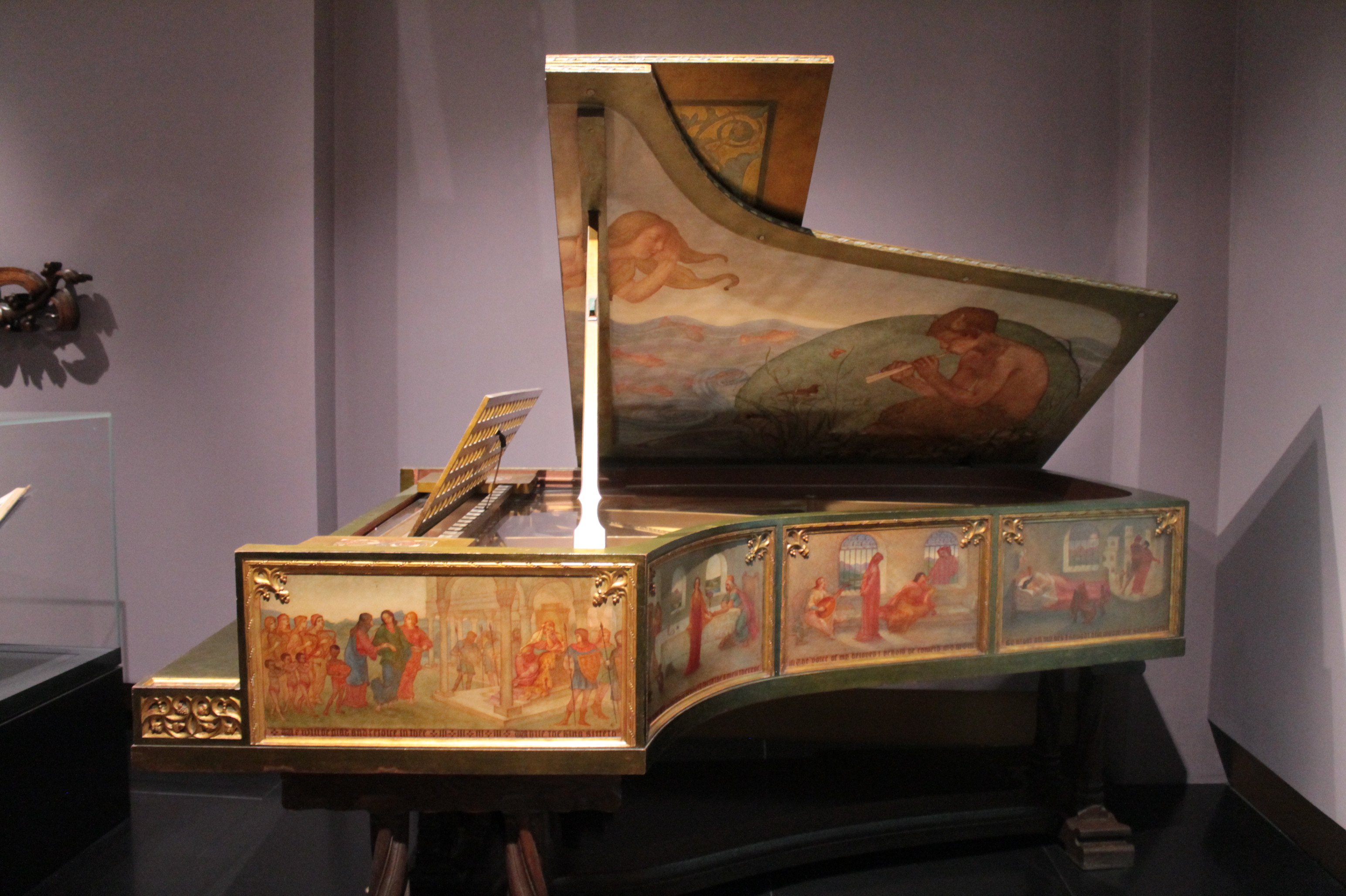
Steinway piano decorated by Phoebe Traquair, National Museum of Scotland

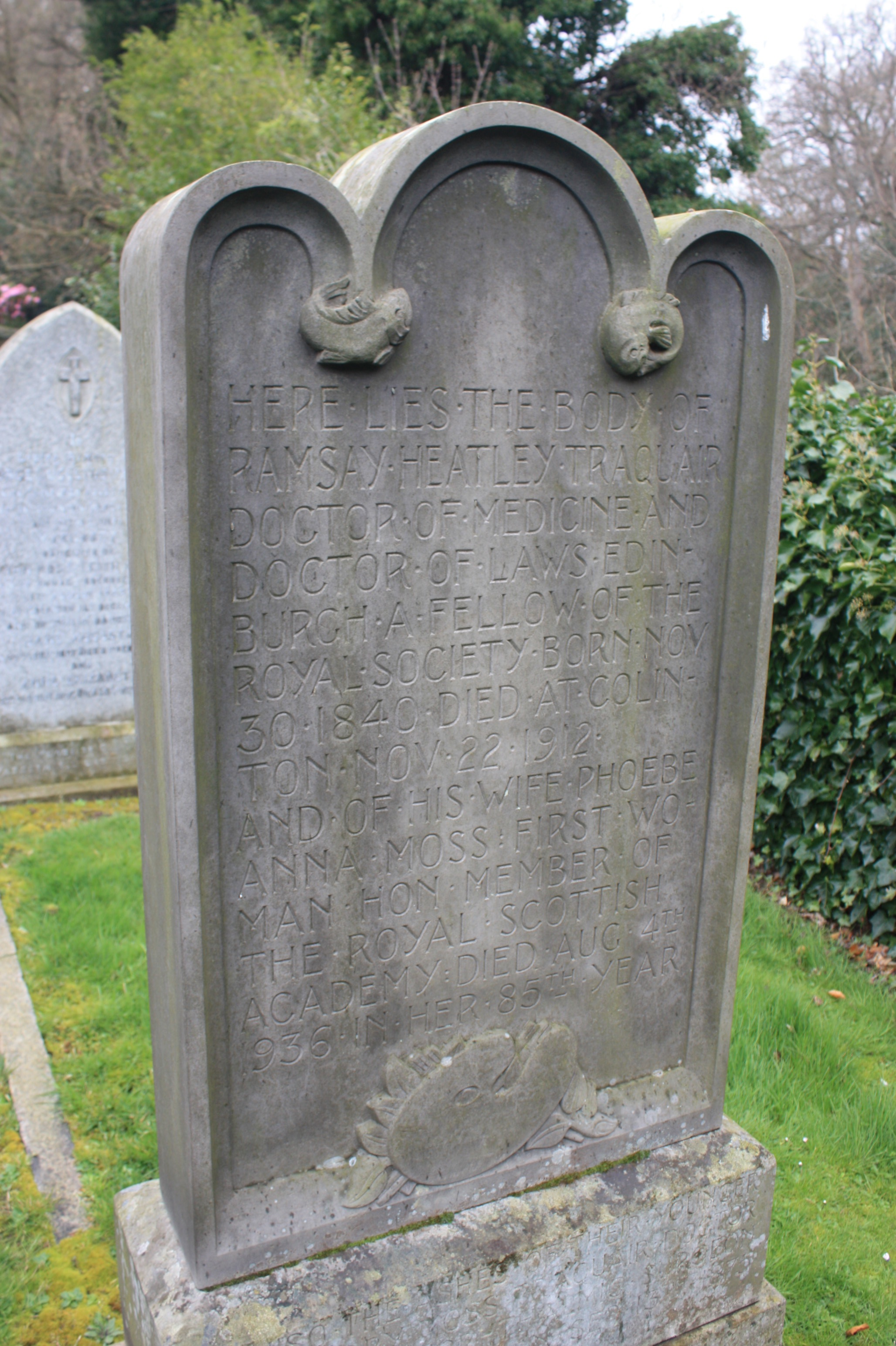
Traquair's grave, Colinton Parish Church graveyard, Edinburgh

Traquair is buried with her husband, and the ashes of her son Harry Moss Traquair, in Colinton Parish Church graveyard in Edinburgh. She designed the gravestone which was carved by Pilkington Jackson.

== Works ==
Illustrations

- John Sutherland Black (1890). Dante Illustrations and Notes. Phoebe A. Traquair, illustrator. Edinburgh: T.& A. Constable (private printer). OCLC 805029900.
- Dante Gabriel Rossetti (1904). The House of Life. Phoebe A. Traquair, illustrator. Edinburgh: William J. Hay.
