= Harry Moss Traquair =

Scottish ophthalmologist (1875–1954)

Harry Moss Traquair FRSE FRCSEd
- Born: 1875; Edinburgh, Scotland
- Died: 14 November 1954 (aged 78–79); Edinburgh, Scotland
- Education: Edinburgh Academy Edinburgh University
- Occupation: Ophthalmologist
- Known for: Perimetry

Henry (Harry) Moss Traquair, FRSE, PRCSE (1875 – 14 November 1954) was a Scottish ophthalmic surgeon who made important contributions to the science of perimetry and the use of visual field testing in the diagnosis of disease. He was president of the Royal College of Surgeons of Edinburgh in 1939/40 and president of the Ophthalmological Society of the United Kingdom.

== Early life ==
Henry Moss Traquair (generally known as Harry) was born at Colinton Farm south-west of Edinburgh in 1875, the son of Ramsay Traquair MD, FRS, a distinguished anatomist, zoologist and palaeontologist who was Keeper of the Natural History Collections at the Museum of Science and Art (later the Royal Scottish Museum). His mother, Phoebe Traquair (née Moss), was a talented artist and craftswoman, celebrated in her own lifetime as a book illustrator, bookbinder, embroiderer, enamellist and particularly as a mural painter.

Traquair was educated at Edinburgh Academy then studied Medicine and at Edinburgh University. As an undergraduate he developed tuberculosis which troubled him throughout his later life. He graduated MB ChM with first class honours in 1901. One year later he took the Diploma in Public Health (DPH) and this was followed by a period of postgraduate study at the University of Halle in Germany. He obtained the degree of Doctor of Medicine (MD) from Edinburgh University in 1903 and in the following year he became a Fellow of the Royal College of Surgeons of Edinburgh (FRCSEd).

In 1905 he went to South Africa where he spent some three and a half years working as a general practitioner at Ventersburg in the Orange Free State. Here he married Beatrix Nairn in 1906.

== Career ==
Having decided on a career in ophthalmology, he was appointed Ophthalmic Surgeon to the Edinburgh Eye Dispensary in 1910, Ophthalmic Surgeon to Leith Hospital in 1912 and Assistant Ophthalmic Surgeon to the Royal Infirmary of Edinburgh, in 1913. Through his clinical and scientific publications over the next few years, he established a national then international reputation for his work on visual fields and neuro-ophthalmology. He was an original member of the Scottish Ophthalmological Club attending its first meeting in 1911.

In 1927 Traquair was appointed ophthalmic surgeon in charge of wards in the Royal Infirmary and also Lecturer in Diseases of the Eye in Edinburgh University. He was a member of the University’s Senatus Academicus from 1932 to 1941 and served on the University Court from 1941 to 1949.

== Perimetry ==
Traquair's monograph, An Introduction to Clinical Perimetry, first published in 1927, ran to six editions and embodies the results of a series of observations and investigations extending over many years. It became a world classic in perimetry, a branch of ophthalmology with which the name of Traquair is commonly associated. Visual field testing by tangent screen was introduced by Jannik Petersen Bjerrum and Traquair went to Copenhagen to learn from him. He went on to develop standards for clinical perimetry which became widely accepted. He used these techniques to show that the visual field defects caused by pituitary tumours were characteristically asymmetrical.

== Traquair scotoma ==
A scotoma is an area of lost or depressed vision within the visual field, surrounded by an area of less depressed or of normal vision. Traquair described the scotoma which bears his name as follows:‘At the chiasmal termination of the nerve the crossed and uncrossed fibres separate, and a small lesion may occur at this point and effect the crossed fibres only, producing a unilateral temporal hemianopic or quadrantic central scotoma called ‘‘junction’’ scotoma, since it indicates the site of the lesion at the junction of the optic nerve and chiasma’. The 'Traquair scotoma' or 'Traquair junctional scotoma' is found in 1 – 10% of patients with pituitary adenoma but may also be caused by other lesions.

== Toxic amblyopia ==
Amblyopia caused by tobacco or alcohol had been recognised for many years but it was Traquair who gave the most accurate and detailed account of amblyopia caused by tobacco. He described it as follows: 'The scotoma is typically centrocecal in position, and is never central in true sense, that is to say, pericentral...The diffuse nature of the scotoma and its sloping ill-defined margins are valuable signs'.

== Other contributions ==
Traquair described the enlargement (or baring) of the physiological blind spot, as the earliest change in glaucoma. He confirmed the association between retrobulbar neuritis and multiple sclerosis. He suggested, correctly, that multiple sclerosis was the commonest cause.

== Honours ==
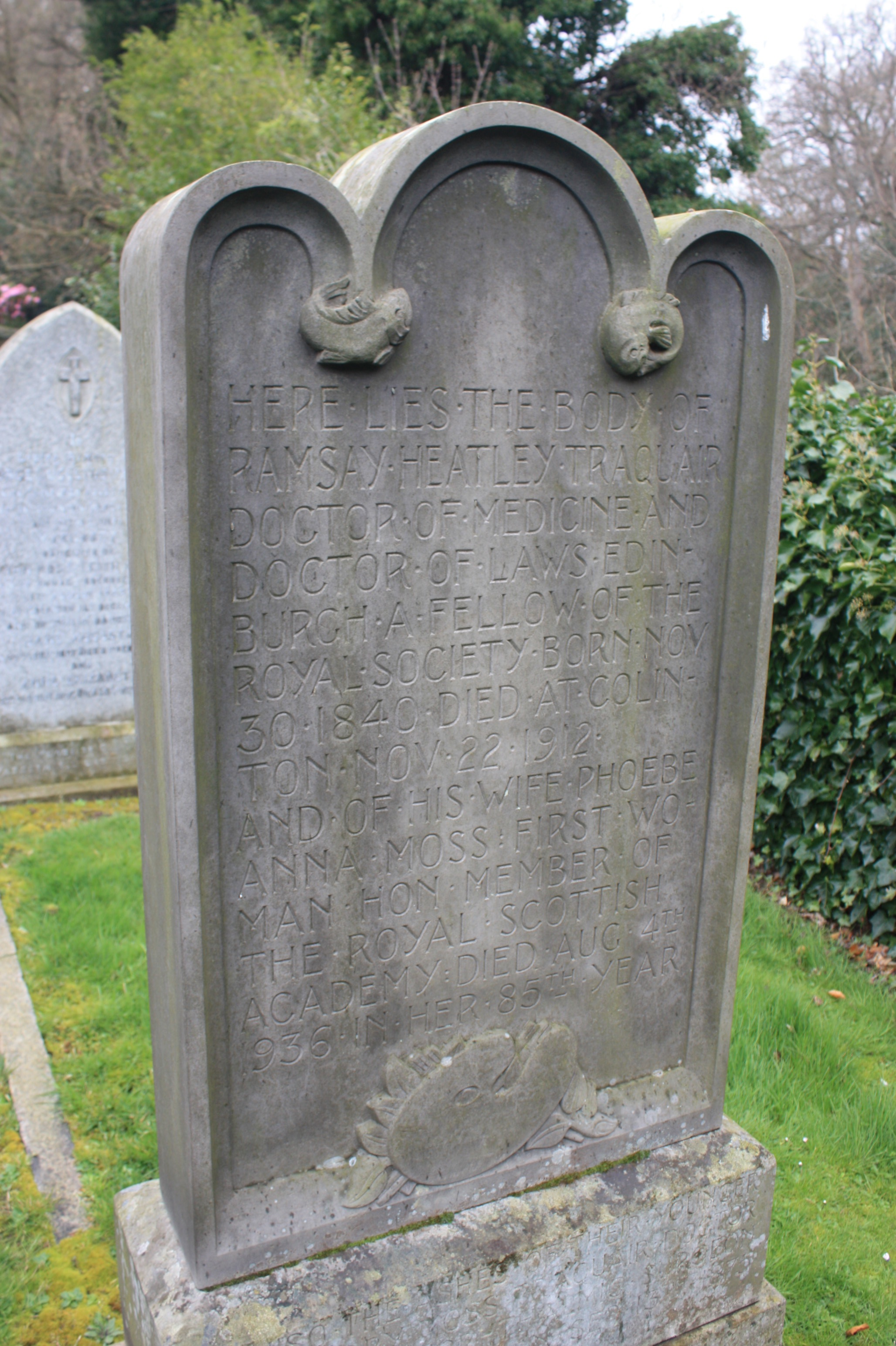
The Traquair grave, Colinton churchyard, Edinburgh

Traquair was awarded the Middlemore Prize for original research by the British Medical Association in 1920. He also received the Doyne Memorial Medal from the Oxford Ophthalmological Congress for contributions to ophthalmology in 1922 and the Nettleship Medal in the same year. He won the Mackenzie Memorial Medal from the Ophthalmological Society of Scotland in 1939. He was elected an honorary member of the American Ophthalmological Society in 1939.

In 1936 he was elected a member of the Aesculapian Club. He was also elected a member of the Harveian Society of Edinburgh. In 1939 he was elected President of the Royal College of Surgeons of Edinburgh. On 4 March 1944 he was elected a Fellow of the Royal Society of Edinburgh (FRSE). His proposers were Anderson Gray McKendrick, Edwin Bramwell, William Frederick Harvey and Andrew Fergus Hewat.

He was due to retire from the staff of the Royal Infirmary in 1940 but because of the absence on military service of younger colleagues, he was asked to continue as surgeon in charge of wards and did so until 1943.

In 1943 and 1944 Traquair was president of the Ophthalmological Society of the United Kingdom and a member of the Council of the Faculty of Ophthalmologists.

== Later life ==
Harry Moss Traquair died in Edinburgh on 15 November 1954 after a long illness. His ashes were interred in his parents' grave in Colinton Parish Church graveyard. The grave lies near the northern edge of the churchyard.
