= Mortuary Chapel, Royal Hospital for Sick Children =

Chapel in Edinburgh, Scotland

- Alternative names: Sick Kids Mortuary Chapel

General information
- Status: Category A listed
- Town or city: Edinburgh

Design and construction
- Architect(s): George Washington Brown

Mortuary Chapel Murals
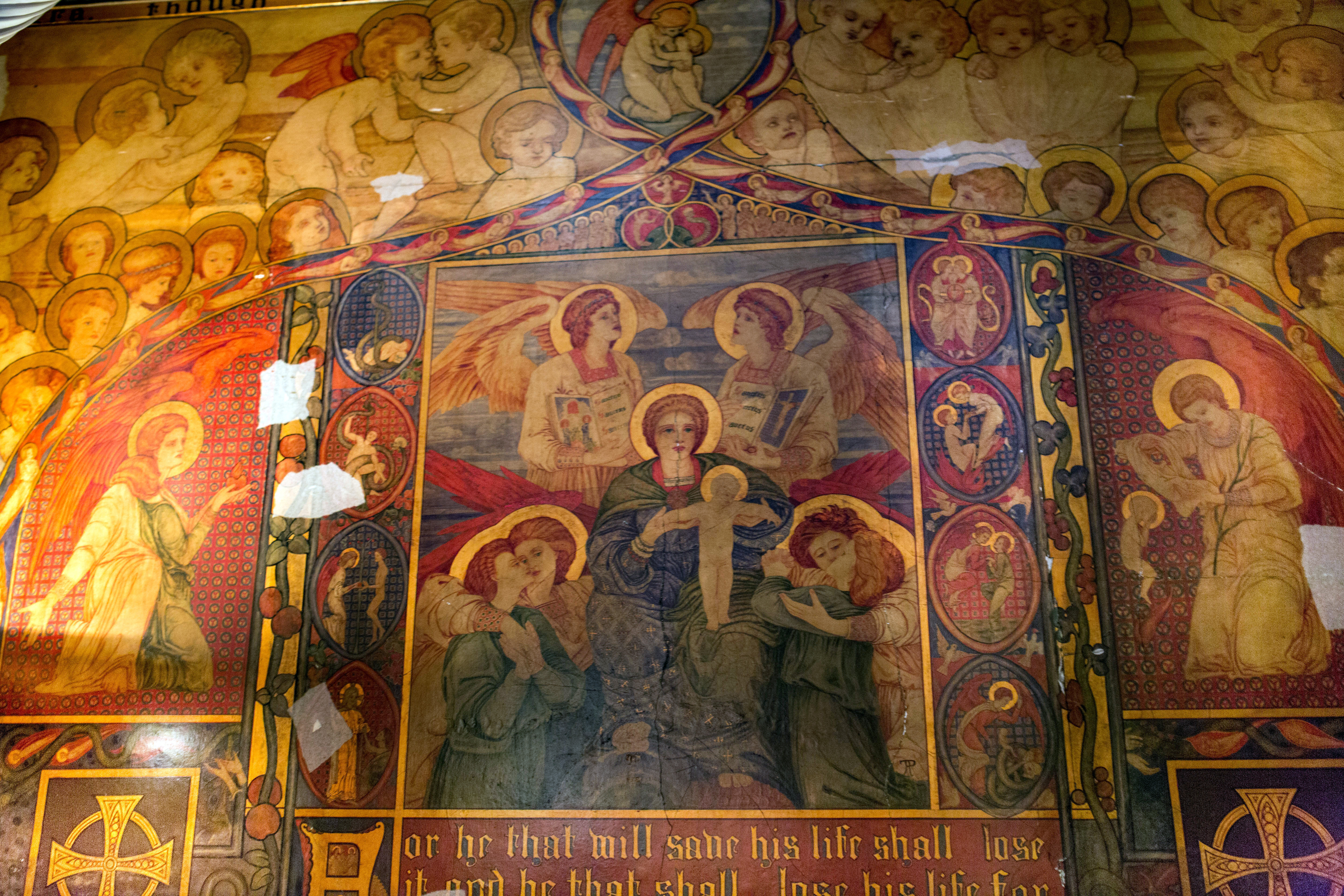
- Artist: Phoebe Anna Traquair
- Year: 1885 - 1894
- Medium: Oil paint on plaster
- Movement: Arts and Crafts
- Designation: Category A
- Location: Edinburgh

The Mortuary Chapel of the Royal Hospital for Sick Children in Edinburgh is a late nineteenth-century chapel, designed by the Scottish architect George Washington Browne, with mural decorations by the Arts and Crafts artist Phoebe Anna Traquair. The chapel is designated as a "Category A" listed building by Historic Scotland. The murals are Phoebe Traquair's first professional commission, and the sole survivor of around 20 commissions instigated by Patrick Geddes' Edinburgh Social Union. They were described in 1887 as "the most important and memorable portion of the art of the Social Union" and in an August 1891 letter to her nephew, Traquair says "I myself believe that in some ways I shall never do better or maybe as well."

== First Mortuary Chapel ==
The original mortuary chapel was located at the Lauriston Lane site of the Royal Hospital for Sick Children.

In April 1885, Traquair was approached by the Edinburgh Social Union and asked if she would decorate a converted coalhouse on the original hospital site at Lauriston Lane, now to be used as a mortuary chapel. The building was small, only 3-metres by 4-metres, but the hospital ladies committee hoped that it could become “a suitable place where the bodies can be left reverently and lovingly for the parents before the burials”. As a mother of three children herself, Traquair was happy to accept the commission.

The decorations were completed in 1886 and strongly reflect themes of motherhood and the redemption of mankind. In a time when as many as 8% of children did not live to see their first birthday, Traquair aimed to offer comfort and support to grieving parents through her decoration scheme. In style she draws on interpretations of medieval illuminated manuscripts and Eastern Orthodox imagery, in a mixture of realism and Symbolism. A review in the Scottish Art Review by Gerald Baldwin Brown in 1889 refers to the murals as “...a piece of illumination enlarged”.

== Second Mortuary Chapel ==
In 1891, the Sick Children’s hospital moved to a new site at Rillbank in Sciennes and the little chapel was abandoned. The second chapel was built as part of Washington Browne's overall design for the hospital and is a single storey building in red sandstone located at the northeast corner of the main hospital building.

Although the old hospital site had been acquired by the Royal Infirmary of Edinburgh the murals were at risk of slow destruction as the chapel was no longer being used. Then, thanks to a petition led by Traquair herself, in 1894 some of the murals were successfully transported to a new purpose-built mortuary chapel. There were significant technical and logistical difficulties; indeed some of the panels were moved and installed still attached to the bricks of the old building. As the new mortuary was larger than the original, panels from the first scheme were repaired, surrounded with fresh plaster, and the spaces filled with an enlarged decoration scheme. Although the two schemes are united by their use of colour, the second scheme deliberately uses a simpler and more childlike manner.

The mortuary chapel remains in use within the Sick Children’s Hospital, though curtains have been installed so that the murals can be covered when required, as the religious themes reflected in the images are not always appropriate.

In September 2017, the Royal Hospital for Sick Children was sold to property developers, including the Mortuary Chapel.

== Gallery ==
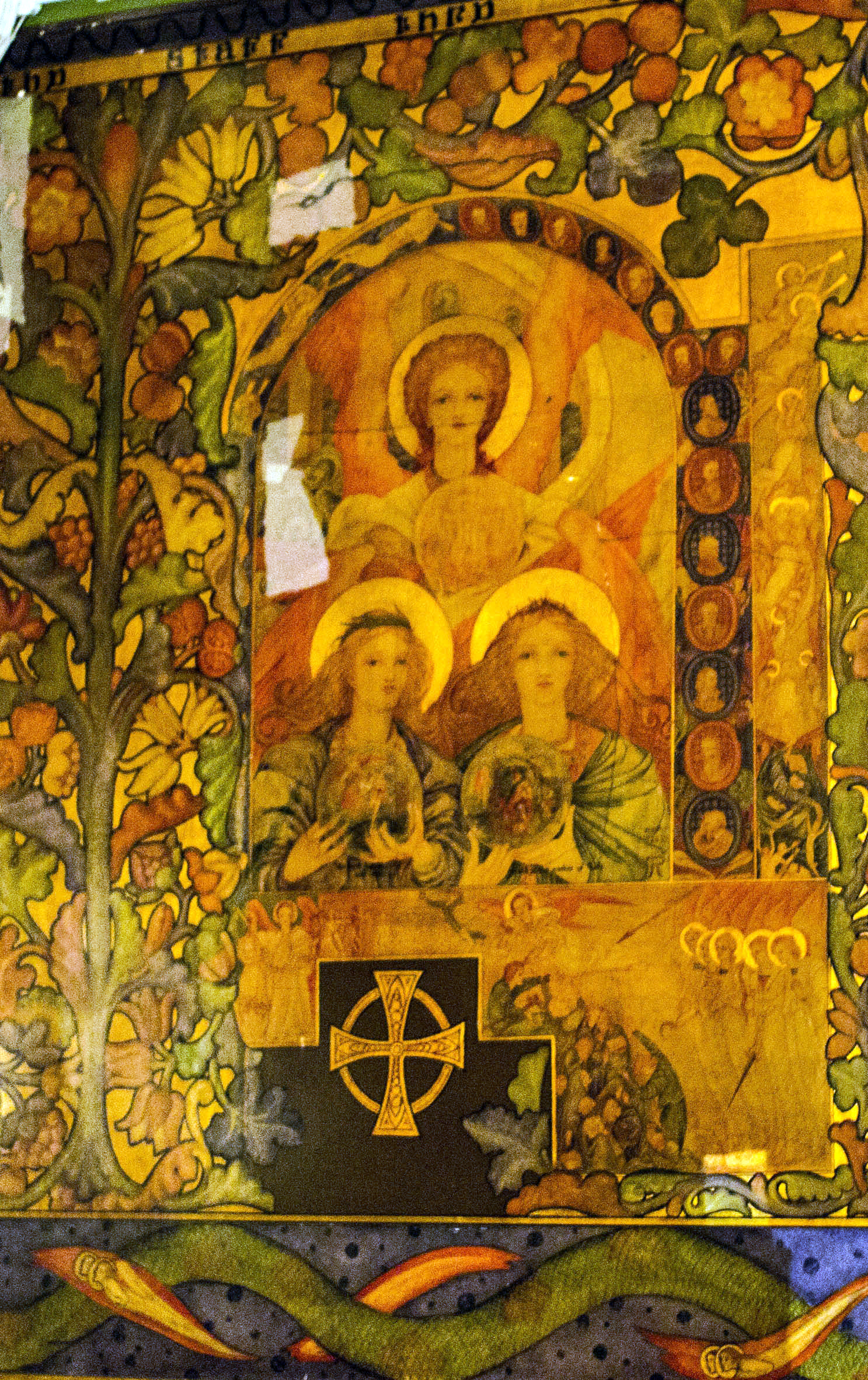

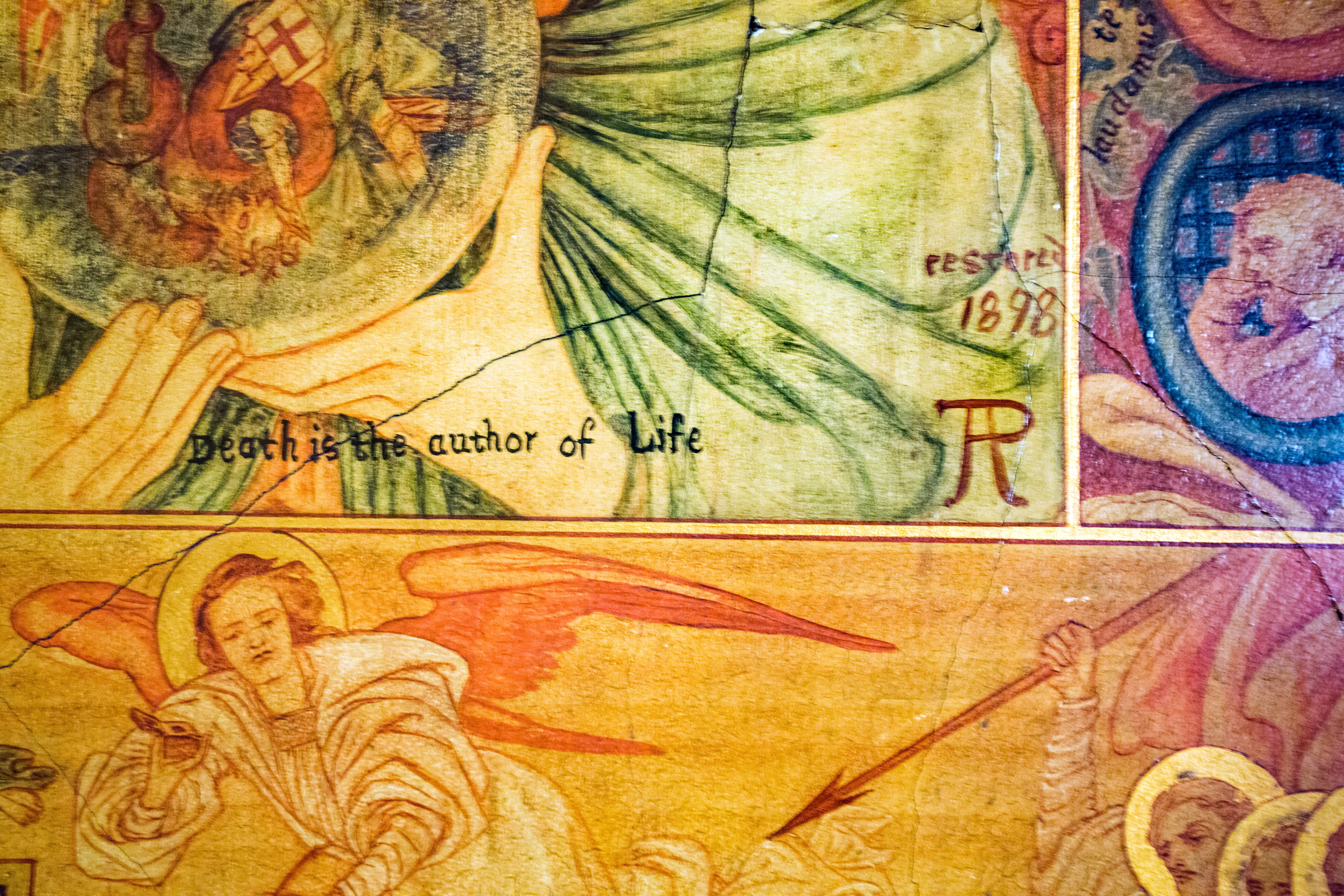

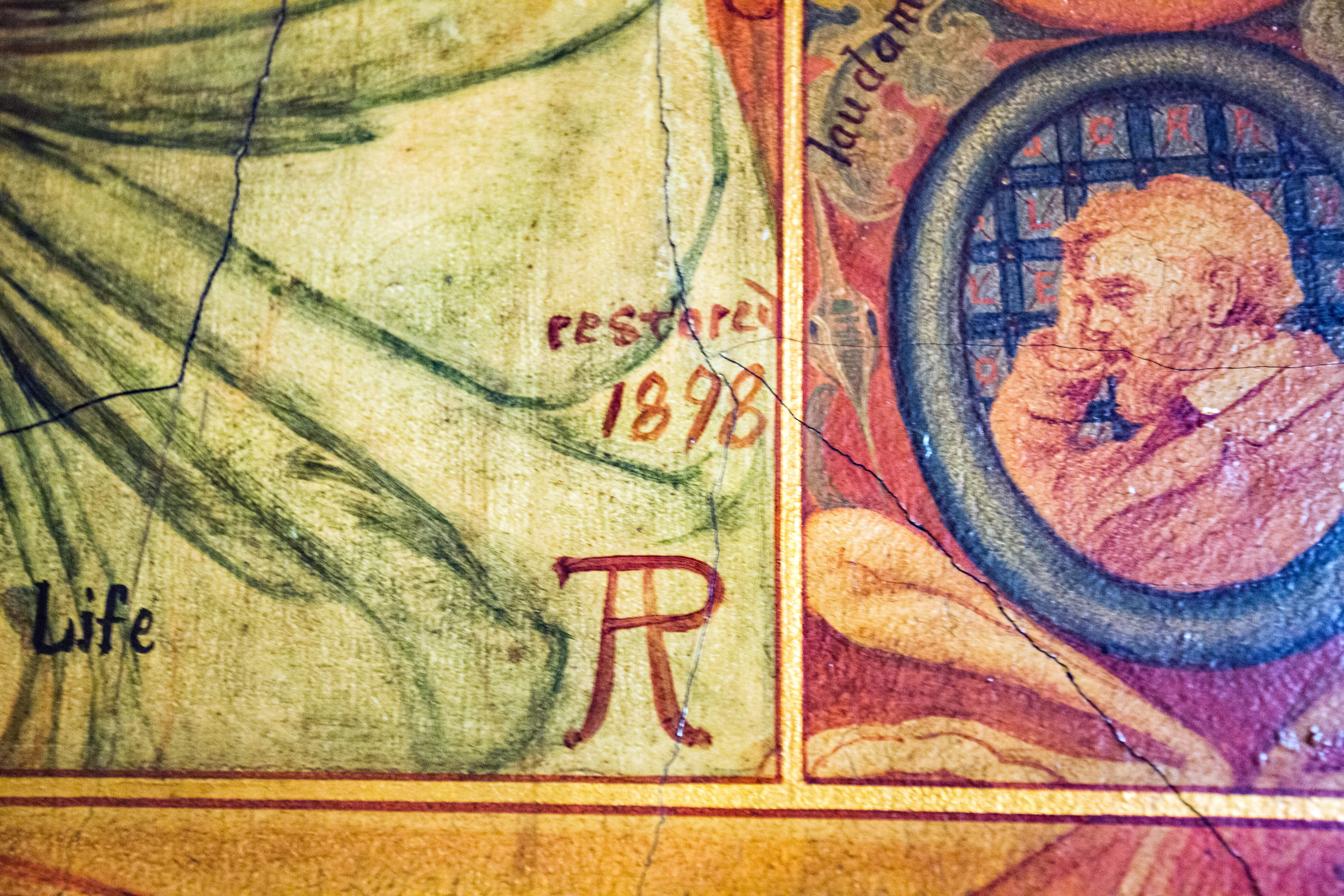

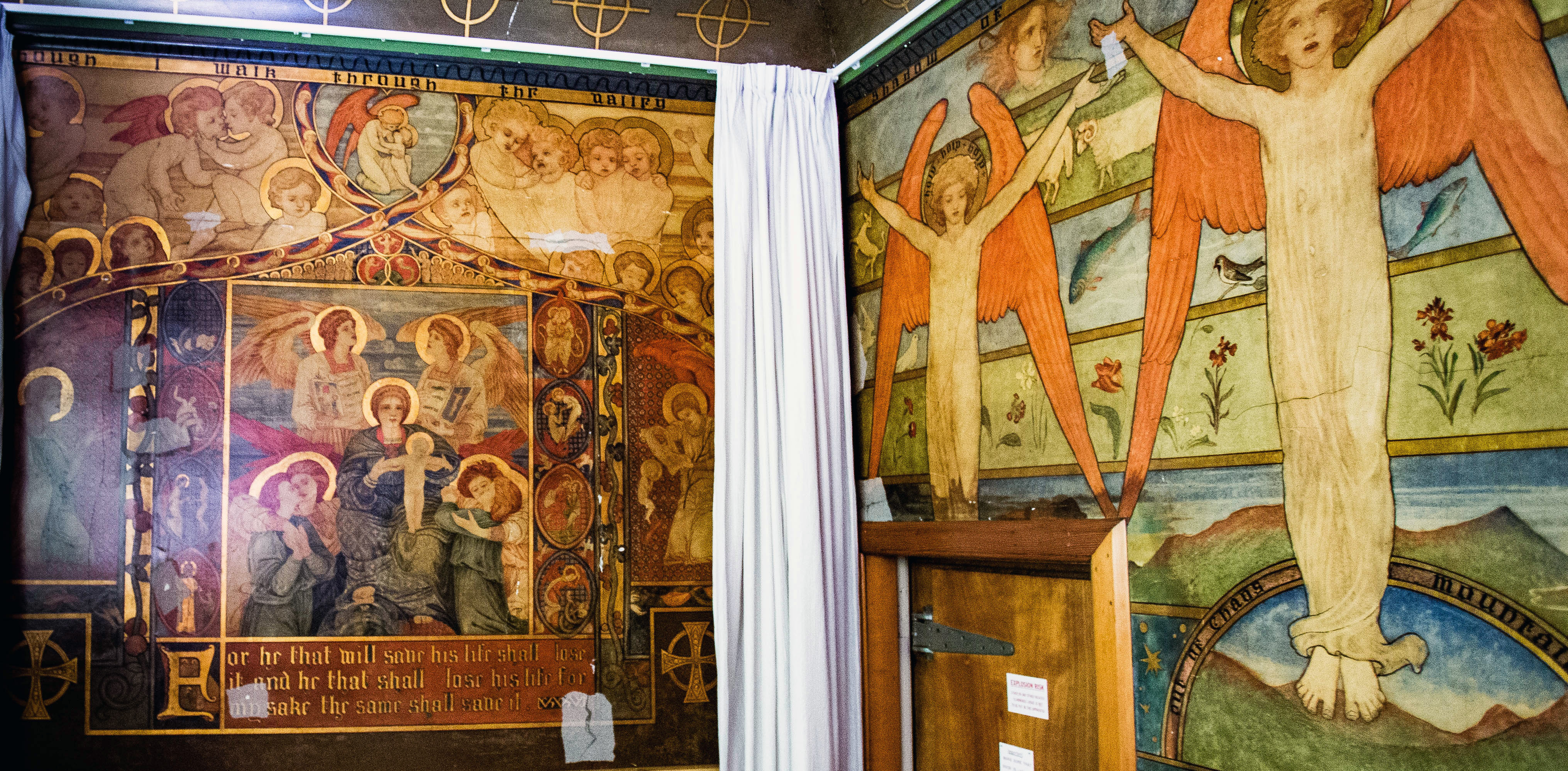

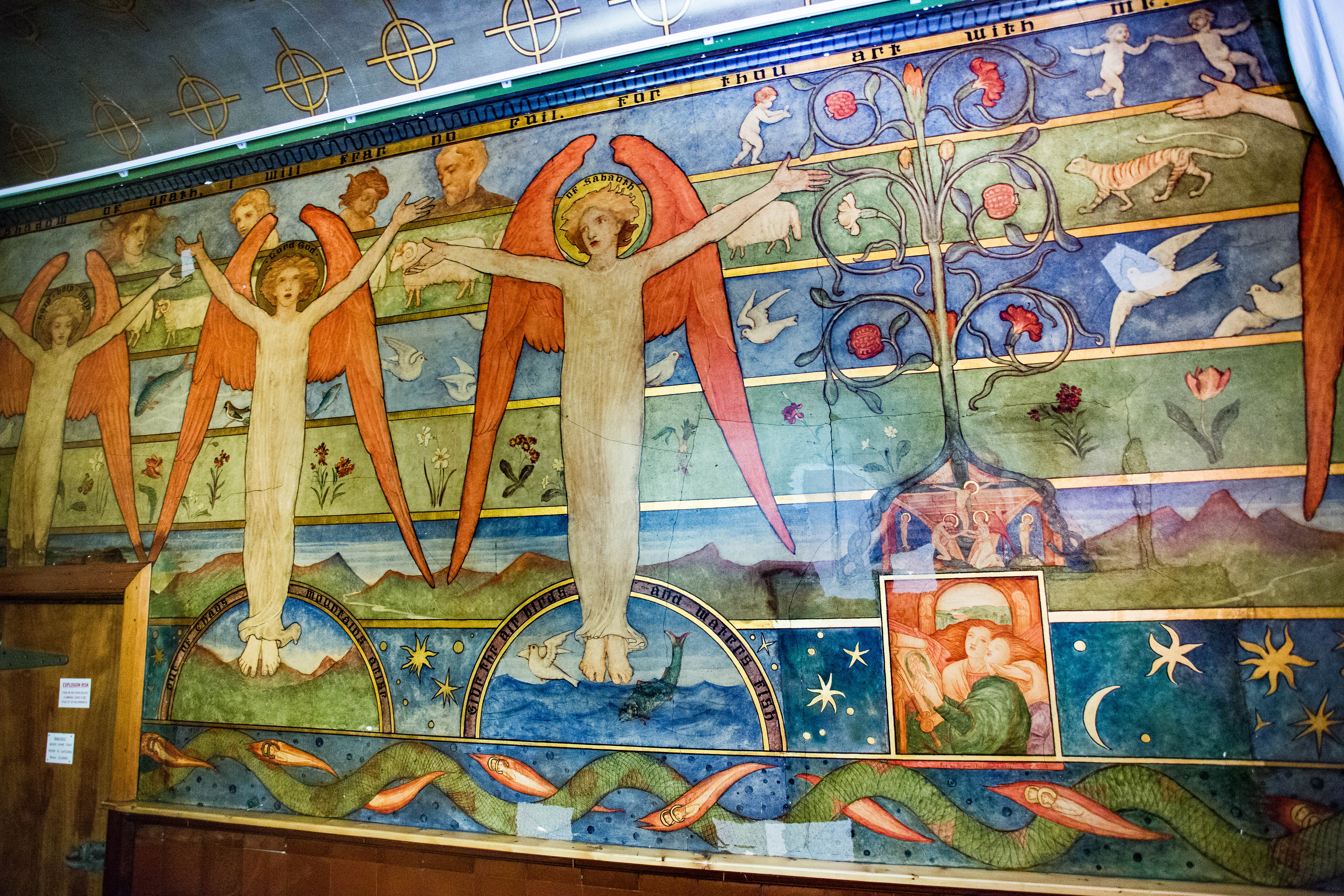

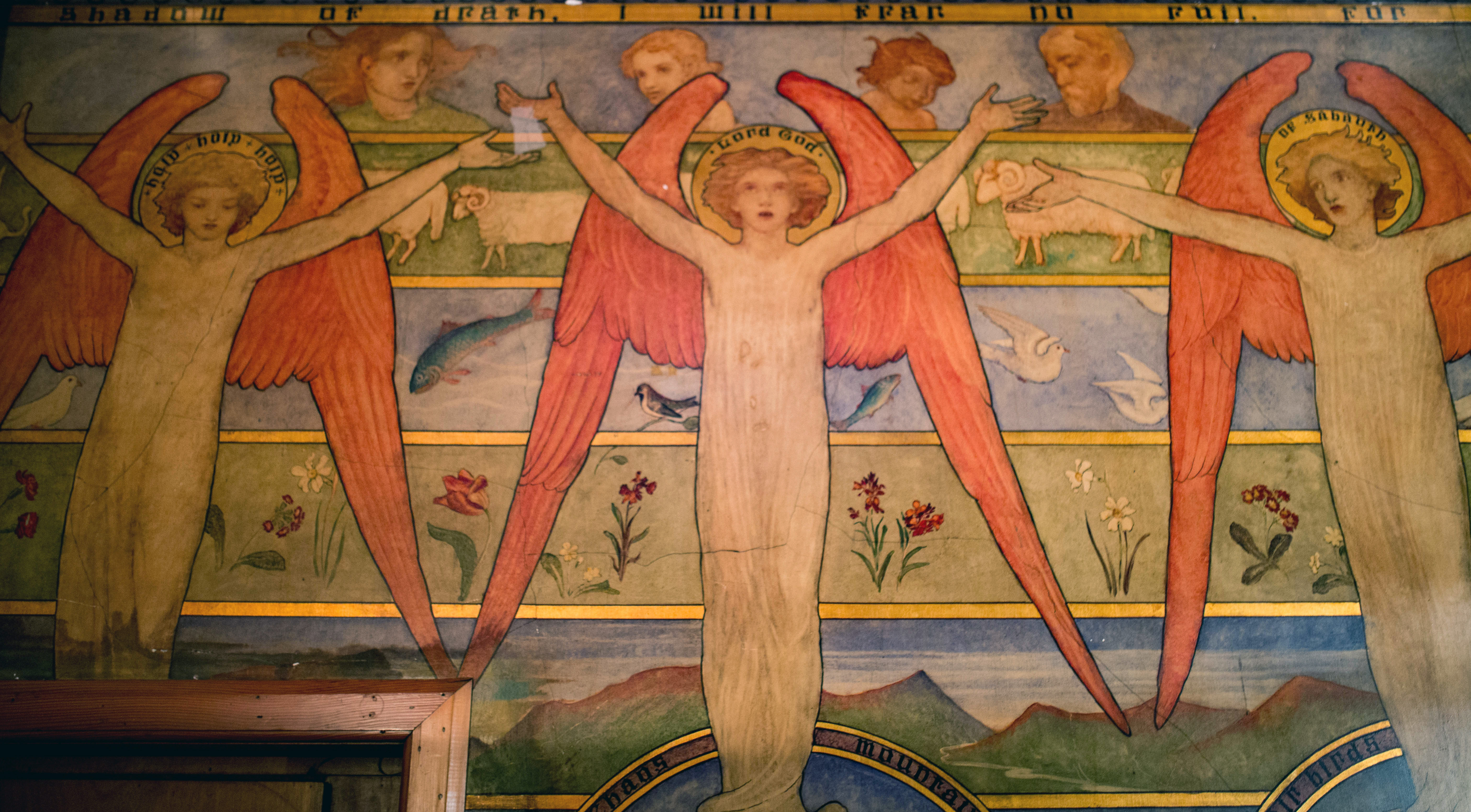

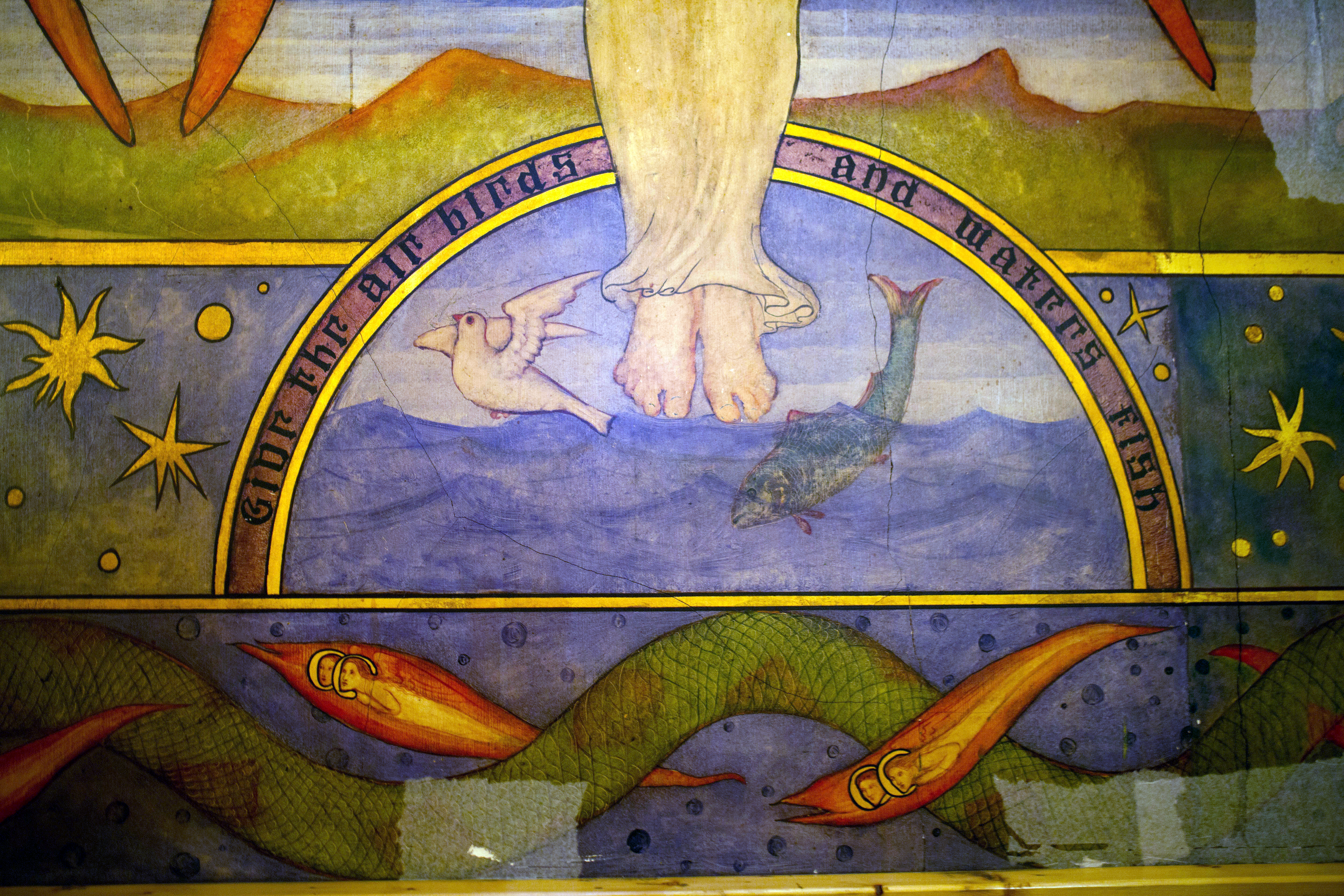

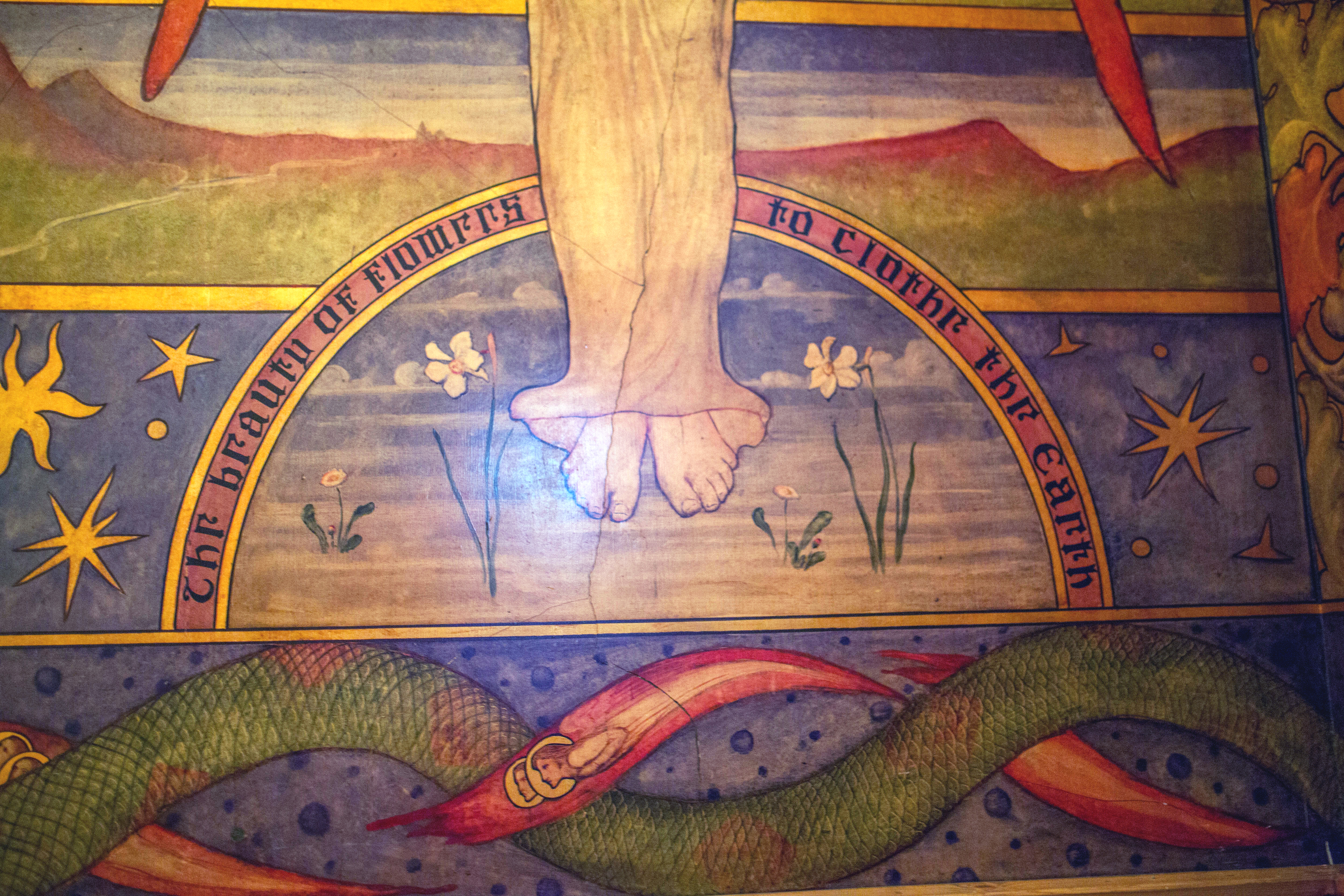

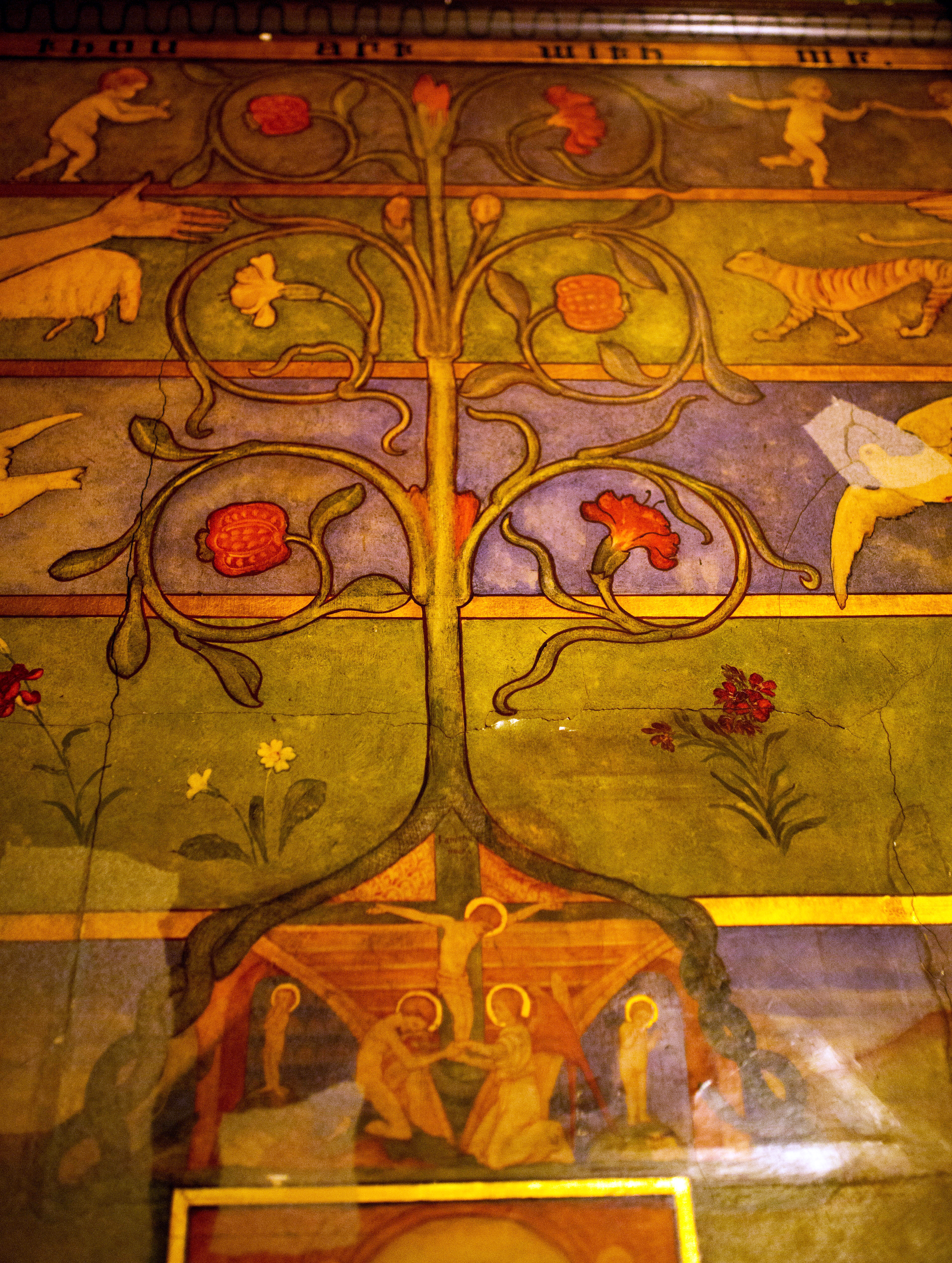

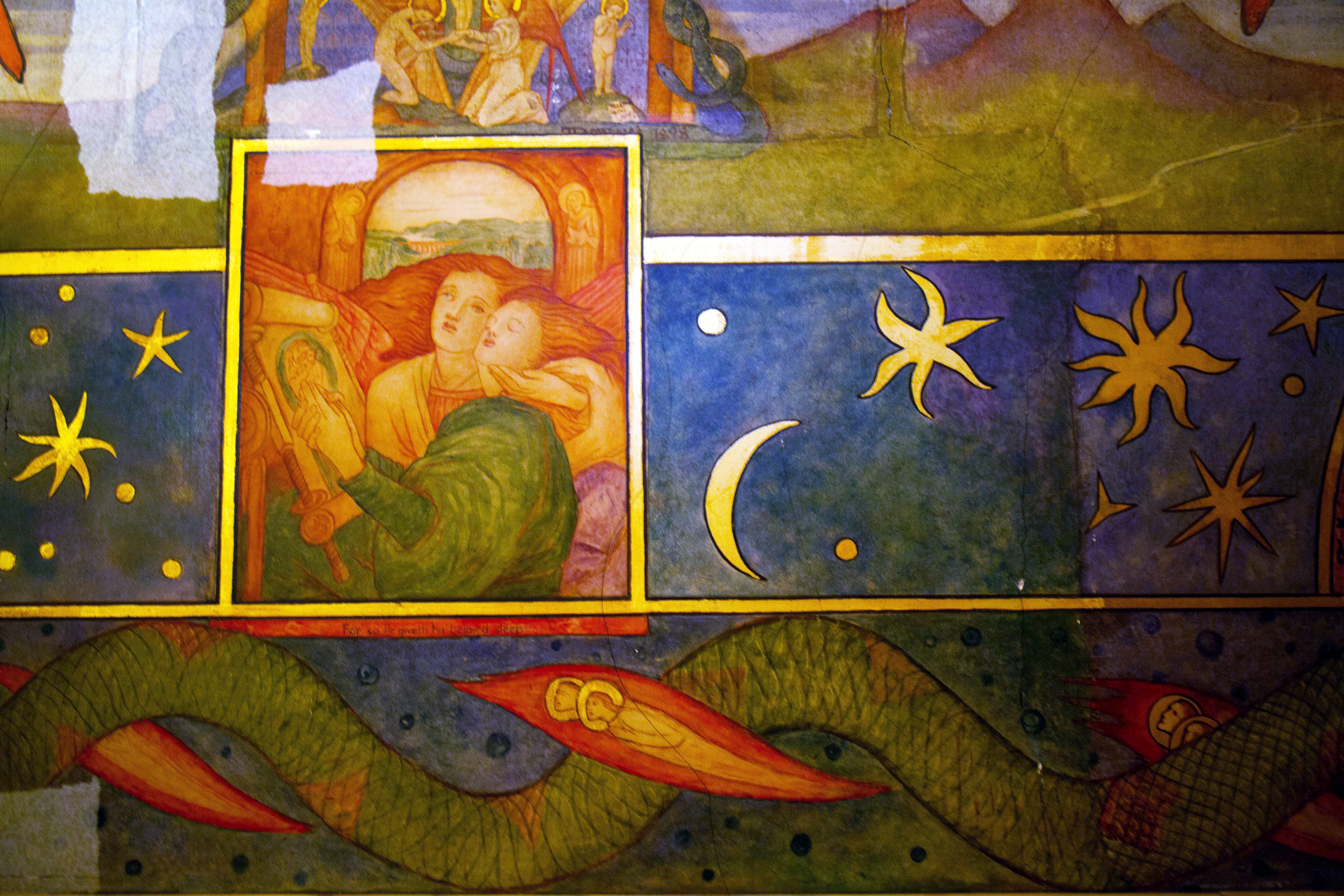

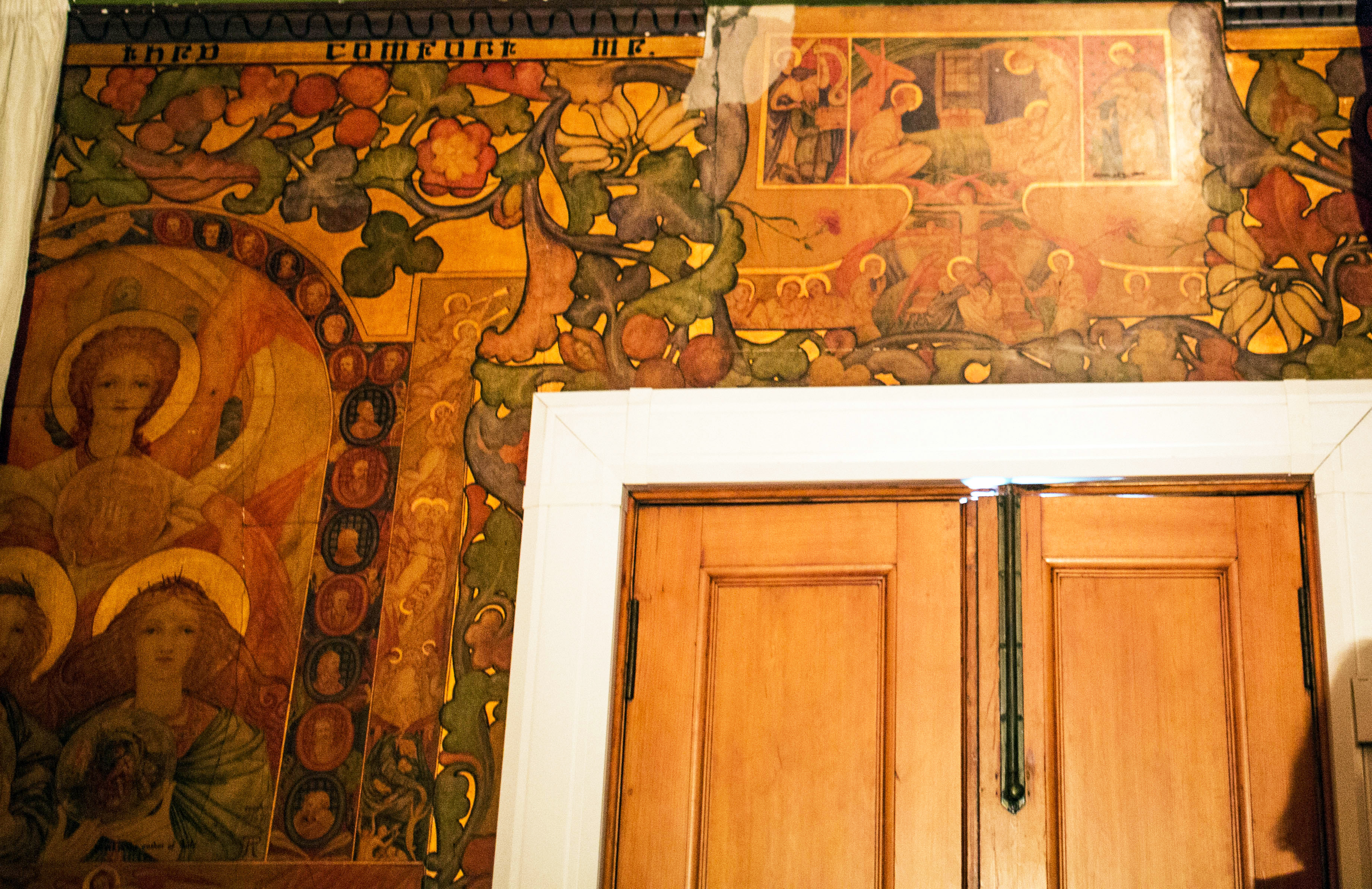

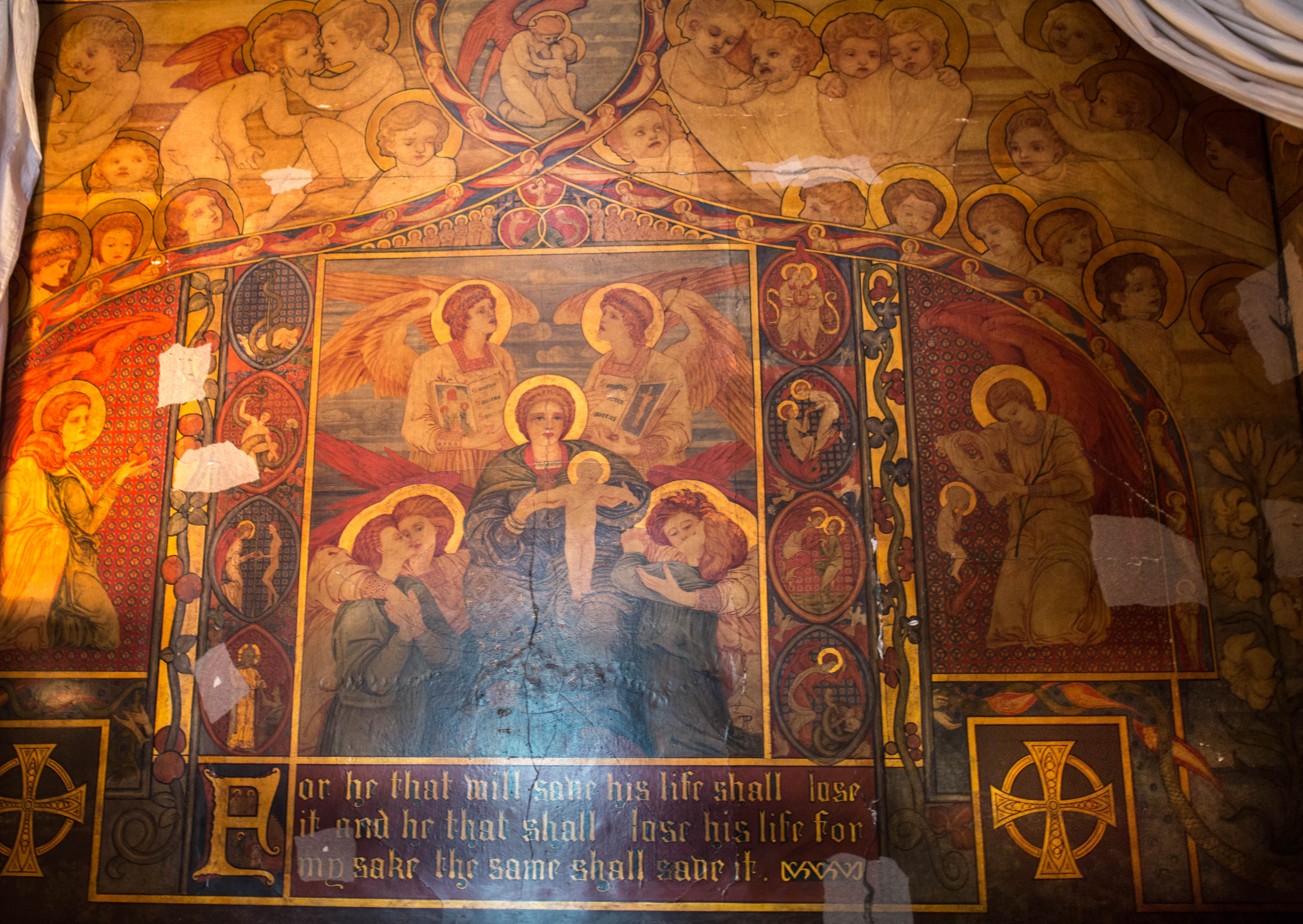

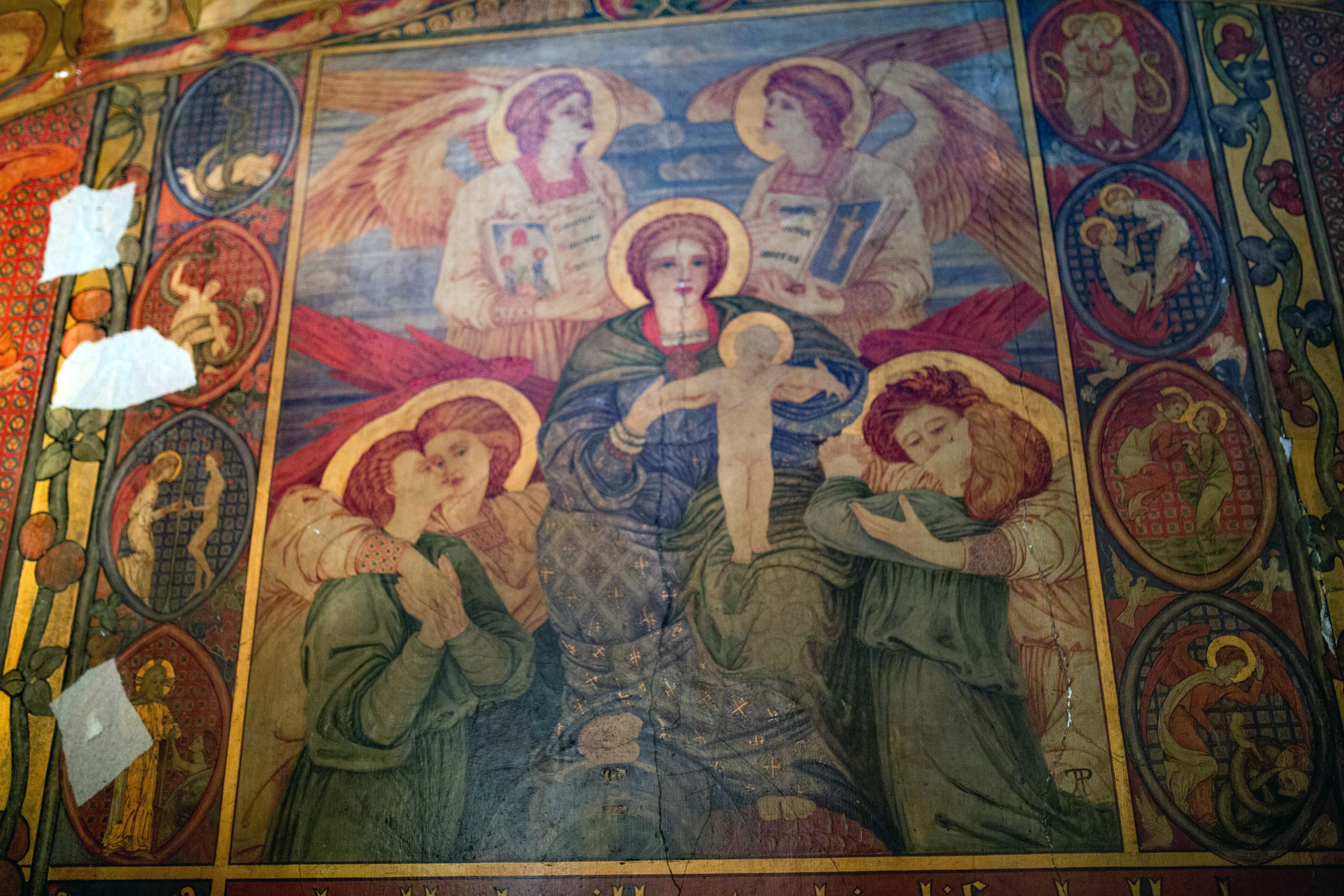

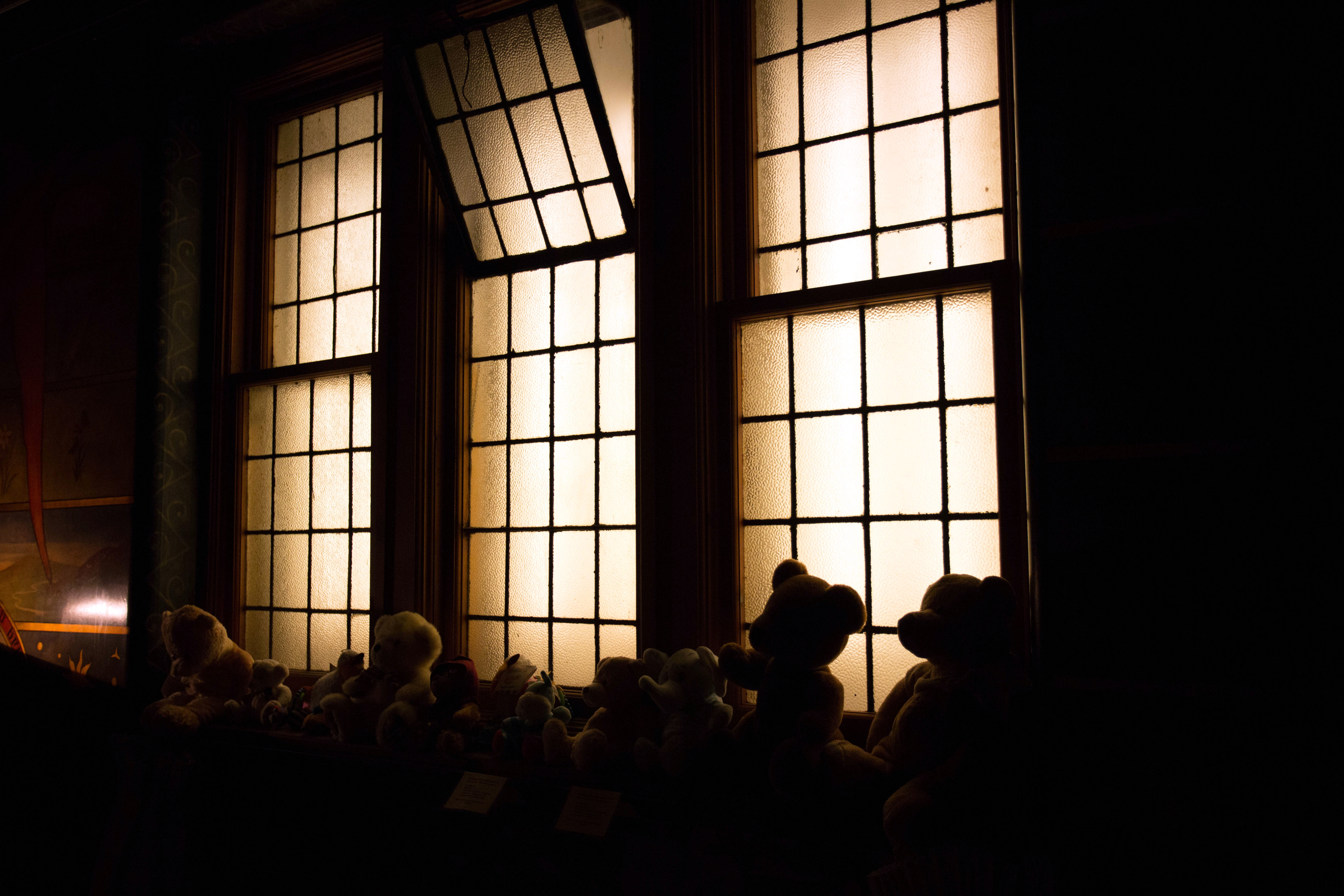

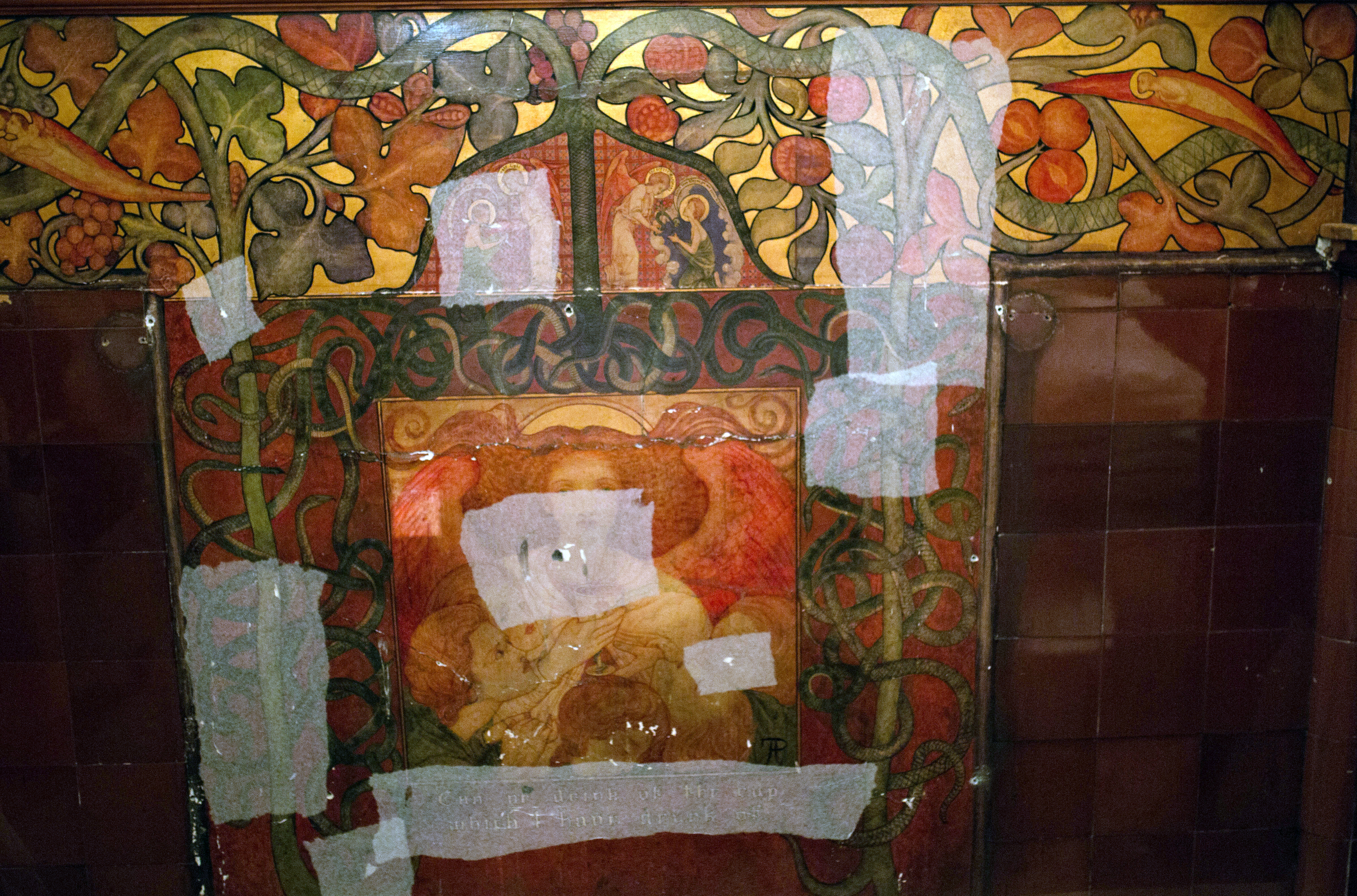
