= Hind (surname) =

Hind is a surname, and may refer to:

- Alfred Hind (1878–1947), English cricketer and rugby union player
- Amos Hind (1849–1931), English cricketer
- Archie Hind (1928–2008), Scottish writer
- Arthur Hind (industrialist) (1856–1933), American industrialist and philatelist
- Arthur Charles Hind (1904–?), Indian field hockey player
- Arthur Mayger Hind (1880–1957), curator at the British Museum and art historian
- Benjamin Hind (1882–1974), English cricketer
- Billy Hind (1885–1963), English footballer
- Charles Hind (1827–1896), Church of Ireland cleric
- C. Lewis Hind (1862–1927), British journalist and art historian
- Ella Cora Hind (1861–1942), Western Canada's first female journalist and a women's rights activist
- Guy Hind (1887–1970), English rugby union footballer
- Henry Youle Hind (1823–1908), Canadian geologist and explorer
- Hugh Hind (died 1977), British SAS soldier
- James Hind (died 1652), English highwayman
- John Hind (mathematician) (1796–1866), English mathematician
- John Russell Hind (1823–1895), English astronomer
- John Hind (bishop in Fukien) (1879–1958), Anglican bishop in China
- John Hind (bishop of Chichester) (born 1945), Anglican bishop and theologian in the UK
- John Hind (swimmer), Australian Paralympic swimmer
- Ken Hind (born 1949), British politician
- Muriel Hind (1882–1956), British motorcyclist
- Natasha Hind (born 1989), New Zealand swimmer
- Nick Hind (born 1994), Australian rules footballer
- Richard Dacre Archer-Hind (1849–1910), English scholar
- Rolf Hind (born 1964), British pianist and composer
- Samuel Hind (1850–1923), English cricketer
- Wheelton Hind (1860–1920), English surgeon and geologist
- William Marsden Hind (1815–1894), British botanist
- William G. R. Hind (1833–1889), Canadian painter and illustrator

== See also ==
- Hinds (surname)
- Hinde
