= John Hind =

John Hind may refer to:

- James Hind (sometimes referred to as John Hind, died 1652), 17th-century highwayman
- John Hind (mathematician) (1796–1866), English mathematician
- John Russell Hind (1823–1895), English astronomer
- John Hind (bishop of Fukien) (1879–1958), Anglican bishop in Fukien China
- John Hind (bishop of Chichester) (born 1945), Anglican bishop and theologian in the UK
- John Hind (swimmer), Australian Paralympic swimmer

== See also ==
- John Hinde (disambiguation)
