= Wood Street Compter =

Prison within the City of London in England

Coordinates: 51°30′55″N 0°5′39″W

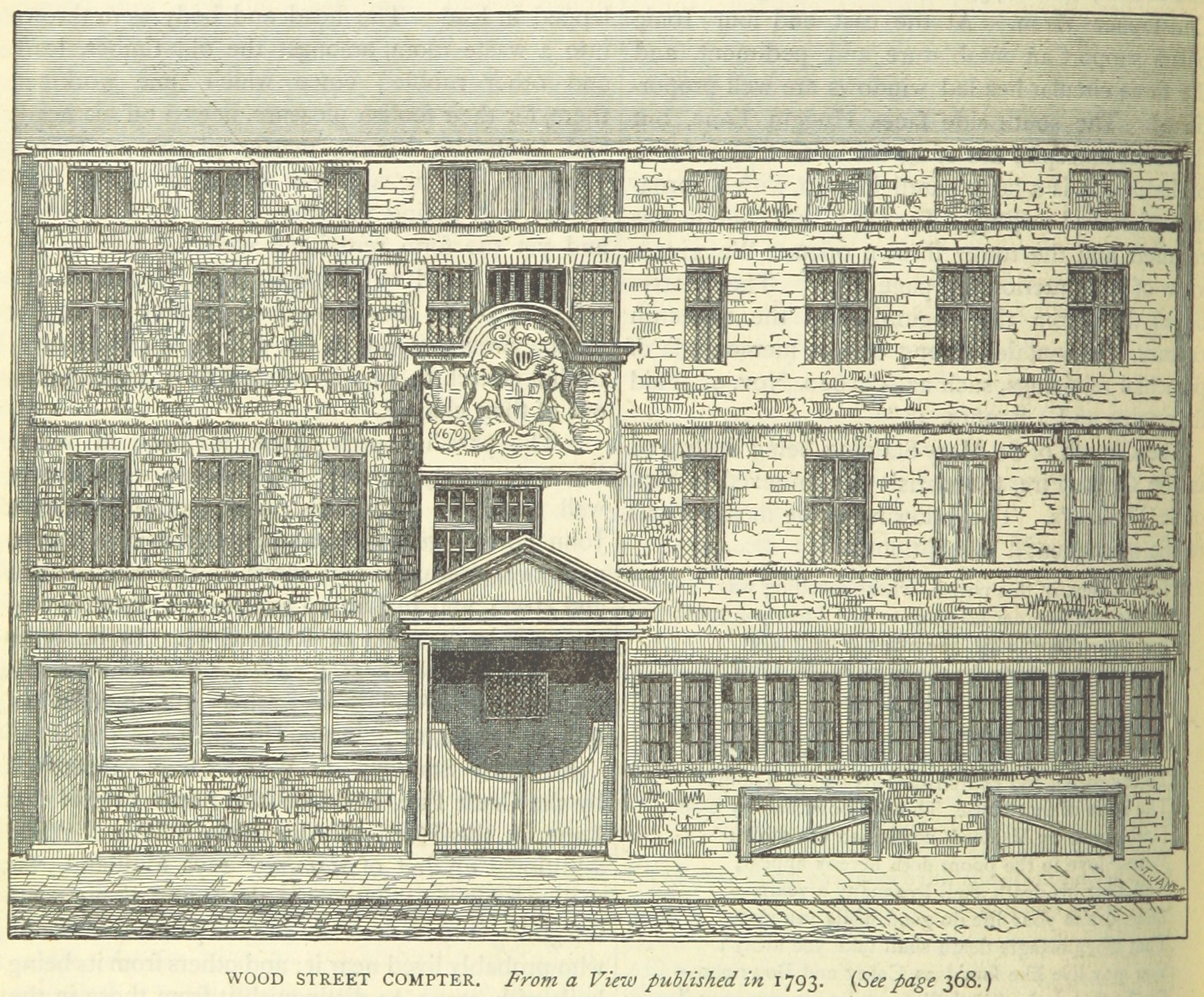
- The Wood Street Compter in 1793
- Interactive map of Wood Street Compter
- Location: London
- Status: Closed
- Opened: 1555
- Closed: 1791

Notable prisoners
- Robert Wedderburn (radical)

The Wood Street Compter (or Wood Street Counter) was a small prison within the City of London in England. It was primarily a debtors' prison, and also held people accused of such misdemeanours as public drunkenness, although some wealthier prisoners were able to obtain alcohol through bribery. The prison was built and opened in 1555, replacing the earlier Bread Street Compter, from which many prisoners were transferred. Wood Street was closed and replaced by Giltspur Street Compter in 1791.

The Compter was originally one of two prisons, the other, the Poultry Compter, located on the Poultry. Both were destroyed during the Great Fire of London in 1666, although the Poultry Compter was rebuilt, and Giltspur Street Compter was constructed in 1791.

The Wood Street Compter was still active in 1727 when The London Gazette (6 July p4) listed 13 insolvent debtors awaiting court on 25 August.

During the closure of the compters, debtors were held in prisons in Southwark, including the Marshalsea and King's Bench Prisons, Borough Compter and Horsemonger Lane Gaol.

Some wine cellars on Mitre Court were marketed as a party venue under the name of "The City Compter" but these appear to date from the mid 18th century; no sign of the prison was found during archaeological investigations of the site of a new office block at One Wood Street.

== Notable inmates ==
- Captain George Orrell
- The Catholic martyr George Napper
- One of the Gunpowder Plotters, Robert Catesby (for his part in Essex's rebellion, 1601)
- The Sabbatarian dissenter John Traske
- The poet Edmund Gayton
- The writer Richard Vennar
- A young Jonathan Wild; and highwayman James Hind.
