= Hinde =

Hinde (or Hynde) is an English surname. Notable persons with that surname include:

- Charles T. Hinde (1832–1915), American businessman
- Chrissie Hynde (born 1951), American musician
- Edmund C. Hinde (1830–1909), American gold miner and laborer
- Frank Hinde (1869–1931), Irish-English cricketer
- Gregory Hinde, American composer
- George Jennings Hinde (1839–1918), British geologist and paleontologist
- Harold Hinde (1895–1965), English cricketer
- Harry Hinde (1865–1942), American businessman, inventor and politician
- Hildegarde Beatrice Hinde (1871–1959), English writer and linguist
- Joan Hinde (1933–2015), British trumpeter and entertainer
- John Hinde (disambiguation), various people
- Sir John Hynde (before 1517–1550), English judge
- Katie Hinde, American evolutionary biologist
- Robert Hinde (1923–2016), English zoologist
- Sidney Langford Hinde (1863–1930), British military physician and author
- Thomas Hinde (disambiguation), several persons
- Tony Hussein Hinde (1953–2008), Maldivian surfer
- William Hinde (1900–1981), British polo player
- William Hinde (soldier), British Army officer in WWII

== See also ==
- Hind (disambiguation)
- Hinds (surname)
