= Hind =

A hind is a female deer, especially a red deer. The name may also refer to:

== Places ==
- Hind (Sasanian province) (262-484)
- Al-Hind, a Persian and Arabic name for the Indian subcontinent
- Islamic State – Hind Province, claimed province of the IS in India
- Hind (crater), a lunar impact crater
- 1897 Hind, an asteroid
- Hindustan/Hindostan, a historic term for India

== Military ==
- HMS Hind, numerous Royal Navy ships
- Hind-class sloop, an 18th-century Royal Navy class
- Mil Mi-24, a Soviet/Russian helicopter codenamed "Hind" by NATO
- Hawker Hind, a Royal Air Force biplane light bomber developed between the two world wars

== People ==
- Hind (name)
- Hind (surname)

== Films ==
- Hind Under Siege, a 2025 Jordanian short film by Naji Salameh
- Close Your Eyes Hind, a 2025 Dutch short film by Amir Zaza
- The Voice of Hind Rajab, a 2025 Tunisian film by Kaouther Ben Hania

== Other uses ==
- Hind (video game), a helicopter game simulation by Digital Integration
- Epinephelus, a genus of groupers (fish) sometimes referred to as hinds
- Golden Hind, was a galleon captained by Francis Drake in his circumnavigation of the world between 1577 and 1580

== See also ==
- Ceryneian Hind, a hind in Greek mythology
- Hinds (disambiguation)
- Hinde, a surname
