= Hind (name) =

Hind is both an English surname and an Arabic female given name.

In Old English, the word hind had three distinct meanings depending on context : 1. Female Deer: A doe (specifically a red deer). 2. Back or Rear: Referring to the posterior part of an animal (e.g., hind legs). 3. Servant or Peasant: A farmhand or member of a household.

In Arabic, Hind (هند) is a traditional and elegant feminine name that carries several beautiful and historical meanings . The most common meanings include: 1. A group of camels: It traditionally refers to a large herd (typically 100 or more) of camels. 2. A long amount of time : 200 years or more .

Notable people with the name Hind include:

== Surname ==
- Hind (surname)

== Given name ==
- Hind the wife of Amr, a sahaba (companion) of the Islamic prophet Muhammad
- Hind Ben Abdelkader (born 1995), Belgian basketball player
- Hind Al-Abadleh (1977 or 1978–2025), Emirati-Canadian chemist
- Hind al-Husseini (1916–1994), Palestinian activist who founded an orphanage
- Hind Azouz (1926–2015), Tunisian writer
- Hind bint Maktoum bin Juma Al Maktoum (born 1962), senior wife and consort of Sheikh Mohammed bin Rashid Al Maktoum, ruler of Dubai
- Hind bint Utbah, Arab woman who lived in the late 6th and early 7th centuries
- Hind Dekker-Abdulaziz (born 1981), Iraqi-born Dutch politician
- Hind Dehiba (born 1979), Moroccan-French 1500 m runner
- Hind Hassan (born 1983), British journalist
- Hind Khoudary, Palestinian journalist
- Hind Khoury (born 1953), Palestinian economist
- Hind Laroussi (born 1984), Dutch singer
- Hind Rajab (2018–2024), Palestinian girl killed by Israeli military
- Hind Rostom (1928–2011), Egyptian actress
- Hind Shoufani (born 1978), Lebanese-Palestinian poet, director, and producer
- Hind bint Abi Umayya (596–683), wife of Muhammad
