= Thomas Wren (priest) =

Thomas Wren (1632–1679) was Archdeacon of Ely from 1663 until 1679.

The second son of Matthew Wren, he was baptised on 20 January 1632 at Church of St Mary the Less, Cambridge. On 31 October 1661 he became a Fellow of Peterhouse, Cambridge, and in 1663 he was elected a Fellow of the Royal Society. He held incumbencies at Littlebury, Northwold and Willingham before his appointment as Archdeacon. He was a Canon of Southwell from 1664 to his death.

Church of England titles
Preceded by Bernard Hale	Archdeacon of Ely; 1663–1679	Succeeded by Barnabas Oley
