= William Hind =

William Hind may refer to:

- Billy Hind (William Hind, 1885–1963), English footballer
- William Marsden Hind (1815–1894), British botanist
- William G. R. Hind (1833–1889), Canadian painter and illustrator

== See also ==
- William Hinds (disambiguation), several people
