= Poultry Compter =

Small prison in the City of London, demolished in 1817

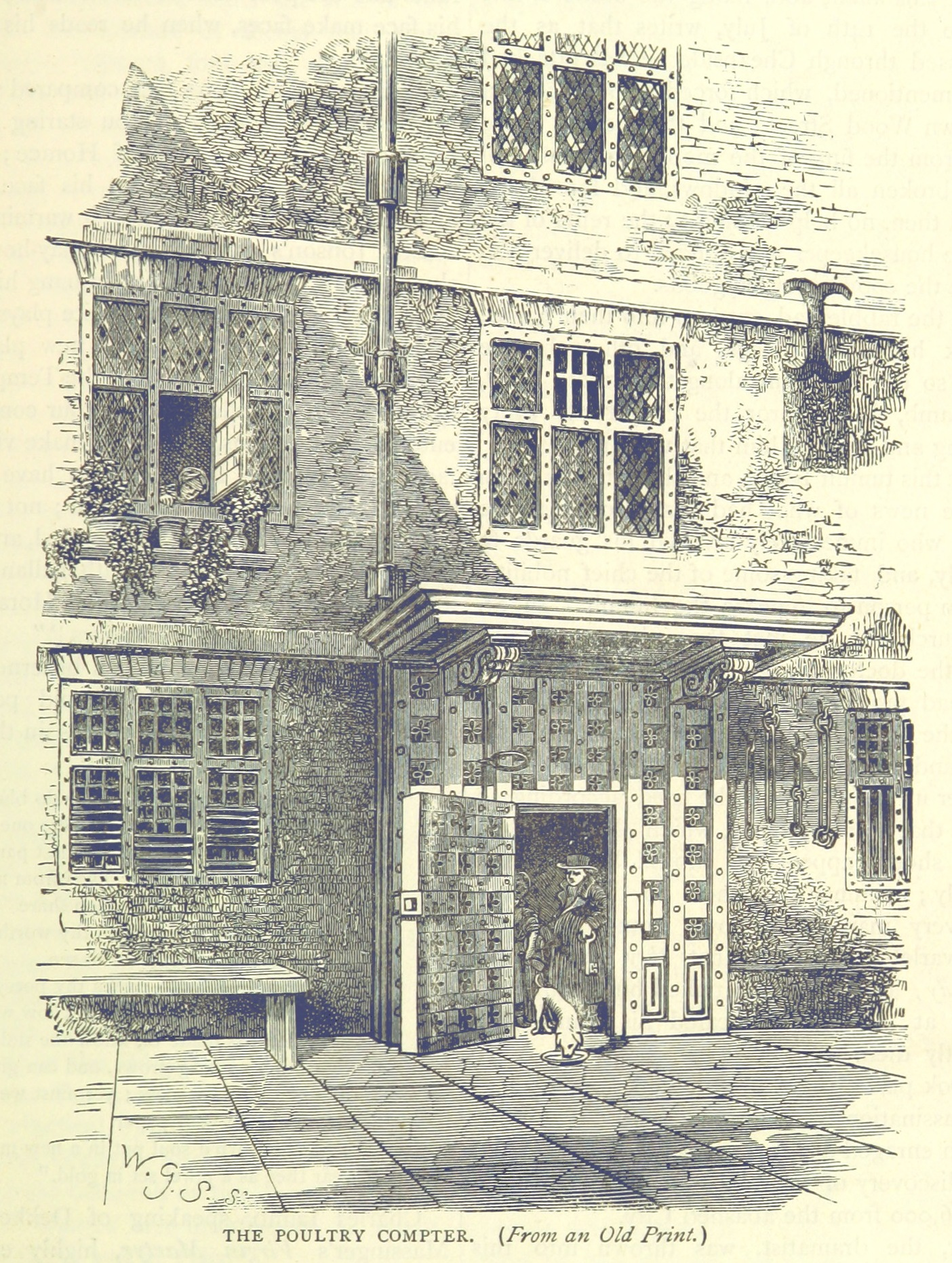
- Illustration of the Poulty Compter c.1813.

- Location within City of London
- Location: Poultry, City of London; 51.5137°N 0.0906°W
- Status: Demolished (1817)
- Opened: 16th century
- Closed: 1815
- Managed by: Sheriffs of the City of London

Poultry Compter (also known as Poultry Counter) was a small prison that stood at Poultry, part of Cheapside in the City of London. The compter was used to lock up minor criminals and prisoners convicted under civil law and was run by one of the City's sheriffs. It operated from the 16th century until 1815. It was pulled down in 1817 and replaced with a chapel.

== History ==
The compter was used to house prisoners such as vagrants, debtors and religious dissenters, as well as criminals convicted of misdemeanours including homosexuality, prostitution and drunkenness. For example, on 1 August 1772, The Craftsman reported that "a well dressed man was detected, near Lombard-street, in an unnatural crime, and immediately committed to the Poultry Compter." On 5 July 1799, a Friday evening, at 7 o'clock, a naked man was arrested at the Mansion House and sent to the compter. He confirmed that he had accepted a wager of 10 guineas (equal to £1,037 today) to run naked from Cornhill to Cheapside.

Prisoners were not segregated and conditions in the small gaol were described as poor. In 1776 William Smith said it was a place where "riot, drunkenness, blasphemy and debauchery, echo from the walls, sickness and misery are confined within them". Another contemporary account said:

the mixture of scents that arose from mundungus, tobacco, foul feet, dirty shirts, stinking breaths, and uncleanly carcases, poisoned our nostrils far worse than a Southwark ditch, a tanner's yard, or a tallow-chandler's melting-room. The ill-looking vermin, with long, rusty beards, swaddled up in rags, and their heads—some covered with thrum-caps, and others thrust into the tops of old stockings. Some quitted their play they were before engaged in, and came hovering round us, like so many cannibals, with such devouring countenances, as if a man had been but a morsel with 'em, all crying out, "Garnish, garnish," as a rabble in an insurrection crying, "Liberty, liberty!" We were forced to submit to the doctrine of nonresistance, and comply with their demands, which extended to the sum of two shillings each.

Certainly, the state of the prison was giving considerable cause for concern and, in 1804, an official report said the prison was:

in such a state of decay, as to become inadequate to the safe custody of the debtors and prisoners therein confined, and extremely dangerous, as well to the lives of the said debtors and prisoners as to other persons resorting thereto.

London Debtors' Prisons Act 1804
- Act of Parliament
- Parliament of the United Kingdom
- Long title: An Act for enabling the sheriffs of the city of London to remove the debtors and prisoners in the Poultry Compter to another place of Confinement in the said city.
- Citation: 44 Geo. 3. c. lxxxiv
- Territorial extent: United Kingdom

Dates
- Royal assent: 20 July 1804
- Commencement: 20 July 1804 (Note: The Acts of Parliament (Commencement) Act 1793.)
- Repealed: 21 July 2008
Other legislation
Repealed by	Statute Law (Repeals) Act 2008

Status: Repealed

Text of statute as originally enacted

This report was contained in a preamble to the London Debtors' Prisons Act 1804 (44 Geo. 3. c. lxxxiv) enabling the city's authorities to move inmates to another City prison (Giltspur Street Compter), although this purpose was not achieved until 1815, following the passage of the Debtors Prison for London and Middlesex Act 1815 (55 Geo. 3. c. xcviii). The Poultry Compter was demolished in 1817.

== Slavery ==
The Poultry Compter was linked to the early struggles to abolish slavery and end British involvement in the slave trade. Granville Sharp, the first English campaigner for the abolition of the slave trade, made several visits to the compter to gain the freedom of several confined African slaves.

Sharp's connection with the Poultry began in 1765 when he obtained the freedom of Jonathan Strong, a young black slave from Barbados. Strong was a mistreated slave who had been abandoned in London by his cruel owner, David Lisle, a lawyer. After Sharp found Strong, he helped him recover from his injuries and found him employment with an apothecary. However, when Lisle discovered that Strong was alive and healthy, he got the keeper of the Poultry, John Ross, and William Miller, an under-Sheriff for the Lord Mayor of London, to kidnap Strong. While Strong was imprisoned in the Poultry, Lisle sold him for £30 to John Kerr, a planter in the American Colonies. But Sharp eventually had Strong released from the compter after successfully appealing to Robert Kite, London's Lord Mayor, that no warrant had been issued for Strong's arrest and confinement.

== Notable inmates ==
- Francis Manners (1578-1632); imprisoned on the orders of Elizabeth I for the Essex rebellion.
- Samuel Boyse (1708–1749); a poet and acquaintance of Dr. Johnson
- Reverend John Bradford; martyr
- William Carter (c. 1548–1584); a Roman Catholic English printer and martyr
- Thomas Dekker (1570–1632); dramatist and rival to Ben Jonson, imprisoned for debt in 1599
- John Gerard (1564–1637); an English Jesuit priest
- Captain James Hind; highwayman
- Nicholas Owen; (c.1562-1606); Saint, martyr
- John Penry (executed 25 May 1593); Welsh martyr
- Rowland Taylor; martyr
- John Traske; sabbatarian
- Thomas Tusser; (c.1524-1580); Author, chorister, farmer
