= Hinds (surname) =

Hinds is a surname. Notable people with the surname include:

- Alfred George Hinds, known as "Alfie Hinds", (1917–1991), English prison escapee
- Alfred Walton Hinds (1874–1957), American rear admiral
- Alison Hinds (born 1970), Barbados soca artist
- Andrew Hinds (born 1984), Barbados athlete
- Anthony Hinds (1922–2013), film producer and scriptwriter
- Bill Hinds (born 1950), American cartoonist
- Brent Hinds (1974–2025), American guitarist, Mastodon
- Ciarán Hinds (born 1953), Northern Ireland actor
- Damian Hinds (born 1969), British politician
- David Hinds (born 1956), lead vocalist of the reggae group Steel Pulse
- Donald Hinds (1934–2023), Jamaican-born writer, journalist and historian
- Ernest Hinds (1864–1941), American major general
- Fitzgerald Hinds, Trinidadian politician
- Franklyn Hinds (born 1967), Cayman Islands cricketer
- Horace Andy (born Horace Hinds, 1951), Jamaican reggae singer
- Jacob Hinds (1800–1873), American politician from New York
- James M. Hinds (1833–1868), American politician from Arkansas
- Justin Hinds (1942–2005), Jamaican ska singer
- Karl Hinds, British rapper and songwriter
- Kaylen Hinds (born 1998), British footballer
- Killick Erik Hinds (born 1972), American musician from Georgia
- Kristina Hinds, Barbadian academic and politician
- Lesley Hinds, Scottish politician
- Lukas Hinds-Johnson, German rugby player
- Martin Hinds (1941–1988), historian of early Islam
- Mavis Hinds (1929–2009), English meteorologist
- Rece Hinds (born 2000), American baseball player
- Richard Hinds (born 1980), English footballer
- Richard Brinsley Hinds (1811–1846), British naval surgeon, botanist and malacologist
- Ryan Hinds (born 1981), Barbados cricketer
- Sam Hinds (born 1943), Prime Minister of Guyana from 1999
- Sam Hinds (baseball) (1953–2019), baseball player
- Samuel S. Hinds (1875–1948), American actor
- Taylor Hinds (born 1999), English footballer
- Thomas Hinds (1780–1840), American politician from Mississippi
- Wavell Hinds (born 1976), Jamaican cricketer
- William Hinds (1887–1957), entrepreneur, jeweller, comedian and film studio owner

== See also ==
- Hinds (disambiguation)
- Hind (disambiguation)
- Hinde (surname)
