= Henry Browne (priest) =

English Anglican priest

John Henry Browne (baptised 28 June 1780 – 2 November 1858) was an English Anglican priest. He was the Archdeacon of Ely from 1816 until his death.

Browne was born in Maidstone, Kent, the son of chemist Samuel Daniel Browne. He was educated at Oakham School. He entered Pembroke College, Cambridge, and transferred to St John's College, Cambridge. He earned a BA in 1803 and MA in 1806 and was a fellow of St John's College from 1808 to 1814. He was ordained as a deacon in 1802 and as a priest in 1804.

Church of England titles
Preceded by Richard Watson	Archdeacon of Ely; 1816–1858	Succeeded by Charles Hardwick
