= Matthew Wren =

English clergyman, bishop and scholar (1585–1667)

The Right Reverend Matthew Wren
- Bishop of Ely
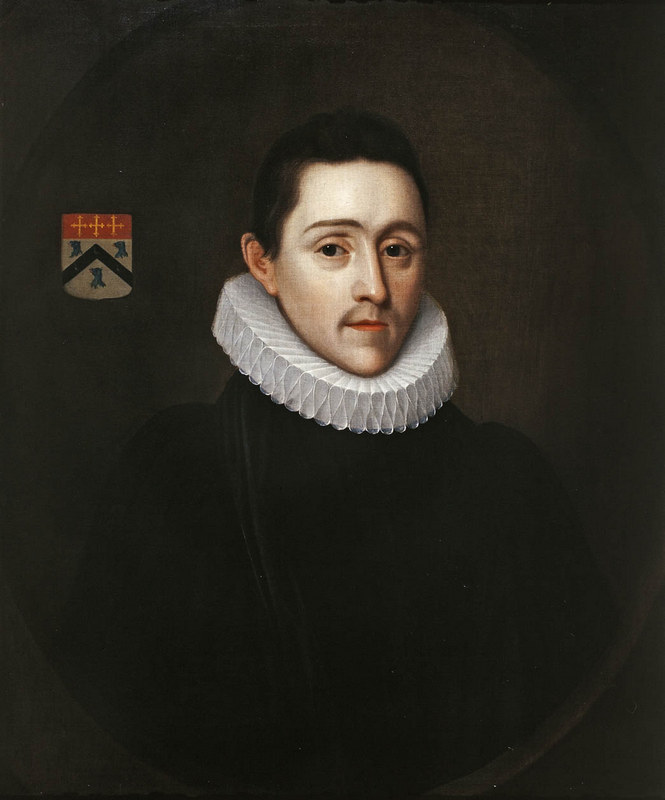
- Church: Church of England
- Diocese: Diocese of Ely
- In office: 1638–1646; 1660–1667
- Predecessor: Francis White
- Successor: Benjamin Lany
- Other posts: Bishop of Hereford (1634–35); Bishop of Norwich (1635–38)

Personal details
- Born: 23 December 1585 Parish of St Peter, Westcheap, London
- Died: 24 April 1667 (aged 81) Ely House, Holborn, London
- Buried: Pembroke College, Cambridge
- Denomination: Anglican
- Spouse: Elizabeth Cutler
- Education: Merchant Taylors' School; Pembroke College, Cambridge

Matthew Wren (23 December 1585 – 24 April 1667) was an influential English clergyman, bishop and scholar.

== Life ==
Wren was the eldest son of Francis Wren, citizen and mercer of London. Matthew Wren's mother was Susan, daughter of John Wiggington. His parents lived in the parish of St Peter, Westcheap in the City of London, and had three children: a daughter Anna, and two sons; Matthew, born 1585, and Christopher, born 1589.

Wren was the brother of Christopher Wren, who also took holy orders, and the uncle of the architect Christopher Wren.

Wren attended Merchant Taylors' School, London, and proceeded in 1601 to Pembroke College, Cambridge, where he was a protégé of Lancelot Andrewes. He became a Fellow in 1605 and later President. He was Master of Peterhouse from 1625 to 1634. He accompanied Charles I to Holyrood Palace for his Scottish coronation in 1633, and was appointed chaplain and Clerk of the Closet. He became Bishop of Hereford in 1634, Norwich in 1635, and Ely in 1638.

However, Wren's strong support of William Laud, Archbishop of Canterbury, and his toughness on Puritans, led to his being imprisoned in the Tower of London by the Parliamentarian faction from 1642 to 1660. Unlike Laud, he survived, and was allowed the freedom to write notes on improvements to the Book of Common Prayer, on which he later had some influence. He was deprived of his See by Parliament on 9 October 1646, as episcopacy was abolished for the duration of the Commonwealth and the Protectorate. Upon the Restoration, he was released on 15 March 1660.

While in the Tower, Wren vowed to devote a sum of money to "some holy and pious employment" should he be released. To fulfill this vow, he chose to pay for a new Chapel for Pembroke College, and had it built by his nephew Christopher Wren – one of his first buildings, consecrated in 1665. Wren also led the movement to rebuild St Paul's Cathedral after it had been damaged by the Puritans, and again his nephew accomplished the task.

Wren married Elizabeth Cutler on 17 August 1628. She was the daughter of Thomas Cutler of Ipswich and Sproughton, Suffolk. Wren’s diary records the event as that he was "joined together in happy matrimony."

Of the twelve children whose birth Wren records in his diary, six died while very young.

- Their eldest son was Matthew Wren
- Francis Wren
- Thomas Wren, Archdeacon of Ely
- William Wren, fourth son.
- Charles Wren
- Susan, who married Robert Wright
- Anne
- Mary
- Frances
- Elizabeth

Wren died at Ely House, Holborn, on 24 April 1667. His body was transported from London to Cambridge and was buried in the chapel he had built at Pembroke College, Cambridge on 11 May.

== Theology ==
Wren was well acquainted with the Dutch Arminian literature. He was himself firmly attached to the Arminian views.

== List of appointments ==
- President of Pembroke College
- Prebendary of Winchester
- Master of Peterhouse, 1625–1634
- Chaplain to the then Prince Charles (later Charles I)
- Vice-Chancellor of the University of Cambridge, 1628–1629
- Dean of Windsor and Wolverhampton
- Register of the Order of the Garter
- Clerk of the Closet 1633–36
- Governor of Charterhouse, London
- Bishop of Hereford
- Prebendary of Westminster
- Bishop of Norwich
- Dean of the Chapel Royal, London
- Bishop of Ely (elected 4 April, confirmed 24 April 1638)

== Notes and references ==
=== Sources ===
- Milton, Anthony (2002). Catholic and Reformed: The Roman and Protestant Churches in English Protestant Thought, 1600-1640. Cambridge: Cambridge University Press.
- Tyacke, Nicholas (2001). Aspects of English Protestantism C. 1530–1700. Manchester: University Press.

Academic offices
Preceded by Leonard Mawe	Master of Peterhouse, Cambridge; 1625–1635	Succeeded by John Cosin
Church of England titles
Preceded by Augustin Lindsell	Bishop of Hereford; 1634–1635	Succeeded by Theophilus Feild
Preceded by Richard Corbet	Bishop of Norwich; 1635–1638	Succeeded by Richard Montagu
Preceded by Francis White	Bishop of Ely; 1638–1646 & 1660–1667	Succeeded by Benjamin Lany
