= William Fennor =

English-Dutch poet (fl. 1617)

William Fennor (fl. 1617), also known as Wilhelmus Vener, was an English bilingual English/Dutch poet and rogue of the Elizabethan and Jacobean periods.

He was the author of The Compter’s Commonwealth (1617). This work was written from his experience of imprisonment at London's Wood Street compter.

He had been an actor at the Swan theatre, where he performed in England's Joy. In 1615 at Theobalds he recited a poem for the king about the differences between Oxford and Cambridge Universities. In 1616 he recited a poem on the Order of the Garter to the court of King James. He appeared in Ben Jonson's Masque of Augurs in 1621. He engaged in a literary dispute with John Taylor the Water Poet.
