= Jeffrey Watson (priest) =

English priest (1939–2021)

Jeffrey John Seagrief Watson (29 April 1939 - 28 January 2021) was a priest in the Church of England. He was Archdeacon of Ely from 1993 to 2004.

Watson was educated at University College School and Emmanuel College, Cambridge. He trained for ordination at Clifton Theological College, and was ordained deacon in 1965 and priest in 1966. After curacies at Christ Church, Beckenham (1965–69) and St Jude's, Southsea (1969–71) he held incumbencies at Christ Church, Winchester (1971–81), and Holy Saviour, Bitterne (1981–93). In 1993 he became the Archdeacon of Ely, a position he held for 11 years.

He died in 2021, aged 81, from an infection.

Church of England titles
Preceded by David Walser	Archdeacon of Ely; 1993–2004	Succeeded by John Stuart Beer
