= John Long (priest) =

British Anglican priest (1913–2008)

The Ven. John Sanderson Long (21 July 1913 – 4 June 2008) was an Anglican priest.

Long was born into an ecclesiastical family and educated at St Edmund's School, Canterbury, Queens' College, Cambridge and Ripon College Cuddesdon. After a curacy at St Mary and St Eanswythe's Church, Folkestone he was a World War II chaplain in the Royal Naval Reserve. He was domestic chaplain to the Geoffrey Fisher, the Archbishop of Canterbury, from 1946 to 1953. He then held incumbencies at Bearsted and Petersfield before becoming the Archdeacon of Ely in 1970. He retired in 1981.

Church of England titles
Preceded by Michael Sausmarez Carey	Archdeacon of Ely; 1970–1981	Succeeded by David Walser
