= Christopher Sargent =

Rev. Christopher Birdwood Roussel Sargent

Headmaster of the Diocesan Boys' School
- In office 1932–1938
- Preceded by: Rev. William T. Featherstone
- Succeeded by: Gerald Archer Goodban

Personal details
- Born: 4 June 1904 United Kingdom of GB & I
- Died: 8 August 1943 (aged 37) Fuzhou, Republican China
- Cause of death: Malaria
- Education: St.Paul's School; St. Catherine's College
- Occupation: Schoolmaster; Bishop

Christopher Birdwood Roussel Sargent (舒展; 4 June 1906 – 8 August 1943) was a schoolmaster, missionary, and bishop of the Anglican Church.

Sargent was born into an ecclesiastical family on 4 June 1906, the son of Church of England priest Douglas Harry Grose Sargent. He was educated at St Paul's School and St Catharine's College, Cambridge, then worked as a schoolmaster teaching physics at Wellington College until 1932. At the invitation of Charles Ridley Duppuy, Bishop of Victoria, Hong Kong, in 1932 he became the headmaster of the Diocesan Boys' School, Hong Kong. He was ordained as a deacon in 1934 and took up the post of assistant bishop of the Diocese of Fukien in 1938; he was consecrated by Ronald Hall, Bishop of Victoria. He became diocesan bishop of the same diocese, the Bishop in Fukien, in 1940. Sargent died of malaria in Fuzhou on 8 August 1943.

Materials for a biography of Reverend Sargent were collected by Reverend Robert W. Howard.

Church of England titles
Preceded by John Hind	Bishop in Fukien; 193401943	Succeeded by Michael Chang
