= Robert Eyton (archdeacon of Ely) =

Robert Eyton was an Anglican priest during the 18th Century.

Eyton was educated at St John's College, Cambridge and ordained in 1705. He was the Rector at Wem and a Prebendary of Hereford Cathedral before being appointed Archdeacon of Ely in 1742. He died in post on 18 October 1751.

Church of England titles
Preceded by Richard Bentley	Archdeacon of Ely; 1742–1751	Succeeded by Charles Plumptre
