= Charles Plumptre =

18th-century English Anglican priest and academic

Charles Plumptre was an Anglican priest during the mid 18th century.

Plumptre was educated at Queens' College, Cambridge. He held incumbencies at Harston, Whaddon and Wimple before being appointed domestic chaplain to the Bishop of Oxford in 1745. He was appointed a prebendary of Norwich Cathedral in 1749; and Archdeacon of Ely in 1751: he was collated on 20 December and installed on 29 December that year. He died in post on 14 September 1779.

Church of England titles
Preceded by Robert Eyton	Archdeacon of Ely; 1751–1779	Succeeded by Richard Watson
