= Robert Tinley =

English Anglican priest

Robert Tinley was an English Anglican priest.

Tinley was born in Kent and was educated at Magdalen College, Oxford where he became a fellow. He held livings at Witham, Glemsford Duxford and Cottenham. He was archdeacon of Cambridge from 1600 until his death in 1616.
