= William Hinds (disambiguation) =

William Hinds (1887–1957) was a studio executive

William Hinds may also refer to:

- Brent Hinds (William Brent Hinds, 1974–2025) American guitarist and singer
- William Hinds (politician) (born 1906), Northern Irish unionist politician
- William L. Hinds (born 1961), Barbadian advisor to the Prime Minister of Barbados

== See also ==
- William Hind (disambiguation), several people
