= David Como =

American historian of 17th century England

David Como (born 1970) is an American historian. Since 2018, he serves as a tenured Professor at the Department of History at Stanford University. Prior, he was an Assistant and then Associate Professor at the same department (having been affiliated with Stanford since 2002). He received a Bachelor's degree in history from Stanford in 1992, and a PhD from Princeton University in 1999. Prior to working at Stanford, Como served as Assistant Professor at the University of Maryland from 2000-2002. He was an Instructor and Postdoctoral Fellow at the University of Chicago from 1998-2000. He is an elected council member of the North American Conference on British Studies.

In his book Radical Parliamentarians and the English Civil War (2018), Como offers a reinterpretation of English radicalism and the outcome of mid-17th-century revolts, noting the roles of artisans, preachers and soldiers in forming revolutionary politics. According to Melinda Zook, this approach enlarges the analytical focus beyond ministerial factions. Como argues that rising radicalisation and changes in allegiance among these groups contributed to the evolution of the English conflict into a revolutionary war. Zook suggests that this approach fills a gap left by earlier historians, who primarily focused on ministerial factions.

Together with Michael Questier, Como was the editor of Religion, Politics and the Public Sphere, 1500-1850, a collection of essays written in honor of fellow historian Peter Lake published in 2025.

== Works ==
He is best-known for his 2018 book Radical Parliamentarians and the English Civil War, which was deemed by British historian Keith Thomas to be "an outstanding work of meticulous research which throws new light on the origin of the radical political and religious ideas..." Another scholar, John Coffey, deemed it "...essential reading for anyone who wants to understand the English Revolution and the radical Puritans who shaped its course." in a review written in The Journal of Ecclesiastical History.

Another frequently cited work is his 2004 book Blown by the Spirit: puritanism and the emergence of an antinomian underground in pre-Civil-War England, where he explores the motivations behind the radical Antinomian underground in England during the period before the English Revolution.

== Awards and Grants ==
- Society of Fellows in Critical Bibliography Essay Prize (2022) for Printing the Levellers: Clandestine Print, Radical Propaganda, and the New Model Army
- The Samuel Pepys Award (2019) from the Royal Historical Society.
- Harold Grimm Prize for The Family of Love and the Making of English Revolutionary Religion, Sixteenth Century Studies Conference (2019)
- Pacific Coast Conference on British Studies Book Prize for Radical Parliamentarians and the English Civil War, Pacific Coast Conference on British Studies (2019)
- John Ben Snow Prize for Radical Parliamentarians and the English Civil War (2019)
- American Council of Learned Societies Grant (2011)

== Editorial boards ==
Como serves on the editorial board of The Journal of Modern History.
