= Herbert Kirkpatrick =

The Ven Herbert Francis Kirkpatrick (31 July 1888 – 21 July 1971) was an eminent Anglican priest in the first half of the 20th century.

He was born into an ecclesiastical family, the son of the Very Reverend Alexander Francis Kirkpatrick, Dean of Ely from 1907 until 1936.

Kirkpartick was educated at Marlborough and Jesus College, Cambridge. After curacies in Middlesbrough and Torquay he became Vicar of All Saints, Cambridge, a post he held until 1922.

He was Principal of the Missionary College of SS Peter and Paul in Dorchester on Thames from then until 1947 when he was appointed Archdeacon of Ely.

Kirkpatrick retired in 1961 and died a decade later.

Church of England titles
Preceded by William Leavers MacKennal	Archdeacon of Ely; 1947–1961	Succeeded by Michael Sausmarez Carey
