= Horace Price =

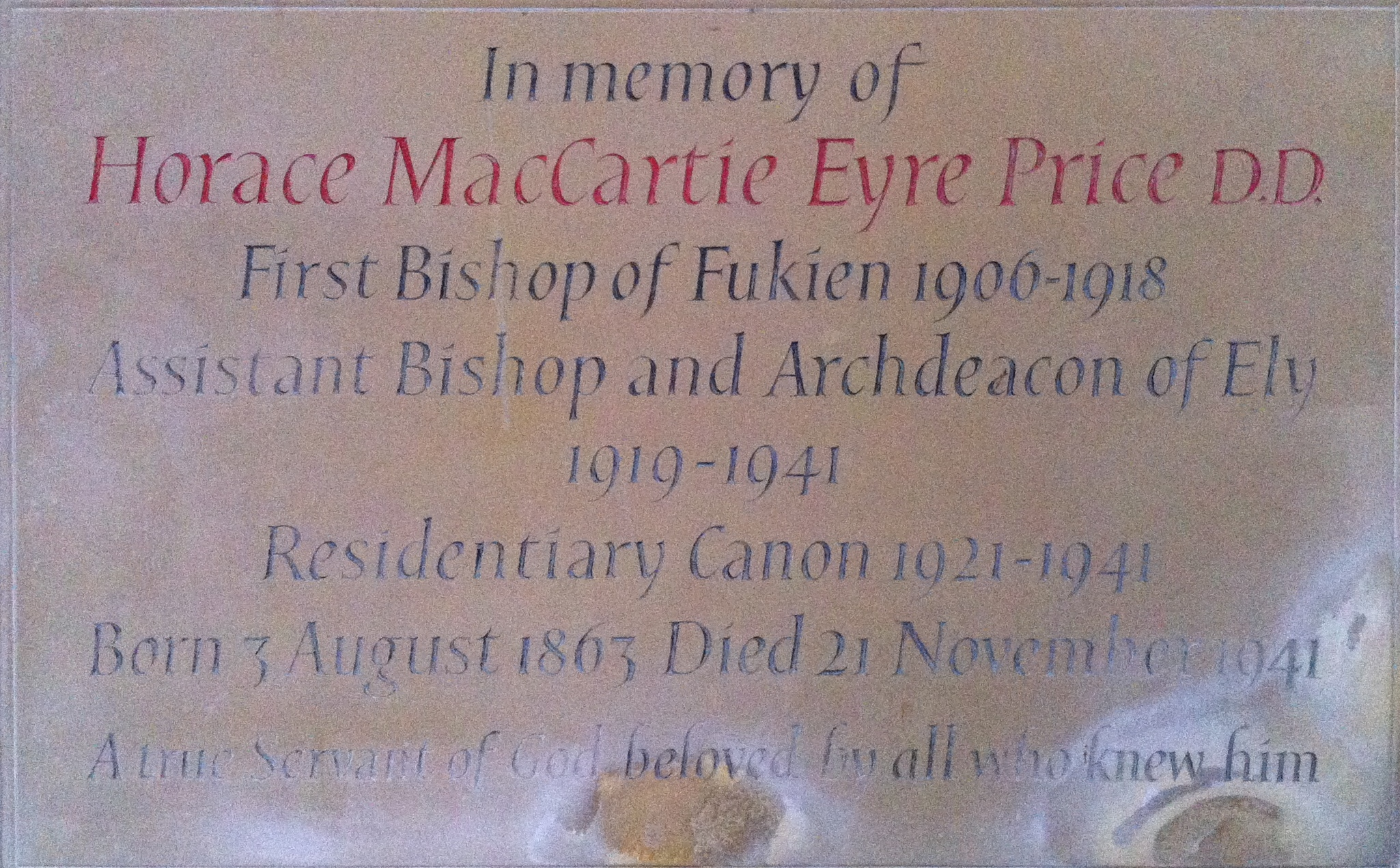
Memorial to Price in Ely Cathedral

Horace MacCartie Eyre Price (3 August 1863 – 21 November 1941) was a missionary of the Anglican Church.

Horace Price was born in Malvern into an ecclesiastical family on 3 August 1863: his father was W. Salter Price. He was educated at Rossall School and Trinity College, Cambridge (whence he gained a Cambridge Master of Arts {MA Cantab}), made deacon at Advent 1886 (19 December), by Archibald Campbell Tait, Bishop of London, at St James's, Piccadilly and ordained priest the following year. He was a CMS Missionary in Sierra Leone then a Curate in Wingfield, Suffolk before serving the Anglican Church in Japan where he eventually became Archdeacon of Osaka. In 1905 he became Bishop in Fukien, serving until 1918. He was consecrated bishop on Candlemas 1906 (2 February) at Westminster Abbey, by Randall Davidson, Archbishop of Canterbury. Although almost 53 years of age, Eyre Price sought a commission as a Temporary Chaplain to the Forces in July 1915. He was appointed and immediately set off for Gallipoli. His diary shows that he was based at a military prison and in hospitals in Alexandria but then he was posted to the Gallipoli beaches. There, he chaired meetings of chaplains and, on one occasion, confirmed eighty candidates. ‘The service was made all the more impressive by the fact it was on the hillside facing the sea and the guns of our warships were thundering all the time.’ After Gallipoli, Eyre Price spent time in Alexandria, Malta, Salonika, and Gibraltar, but had periods in hospital suffering from debility, fainting attacks and an irregular heartbeat. On his return to Salonika in 1918, he caught typhoid and was again hospitalised. He was demobilised in August, 1919. Returning to the UK he was Assistant Bishop of Ely and Archdeacon of Ely (1919 onwards), Vicar of Pampisford (1919–1921) and Canon Residentiary of Ely Cathedral (1921 onwards) until his death on 21 November 1941. He had become a Doctor of Divinity (DD).

Church of England titles
New title	Bishop in Fukien; 1905–1918	Succeeded by John Hind
Preceded by William Cunningham	Archdeacon of Ely; 1919 to 1941	Succeeded by William MacKennal
