= Richard Vennar =

Richard Vennar (or Richard Vennard; 1564–1615) was an English writer, known particularly for his attempt to stage his play England's Joy.

== Life ==
Vennar, baptised on 25 January 1564 at the Church of St Edmund, Salisbury, was the second son of John Vennard of Salisbury, a merchant. He was educated by Adam Hill, prebendary and succentor of Salisbury Cathedral, proceeding about 1572 to Balliol College, Oxford, where he studied for two years as a fellow commoner. Along with an Italian guide, a serving man and a page, provided by his father, he crossed to France towards the close of 1574, visited the court of Henri III, and procured letters of commendation to the emperor, Maximilian II. After some stay in Germany he returned home, and became a member of Barnard's Inn. He was admitted to Lincoln's Inn on 10 June 1581, receiving the privileges of a special admission on 25 July 1587 (Records of Lincoln's Inn, 1896, i. 93).

After the deaths of his elder brother in 1588 and his father in 1589, he found himself involved in a lawsuit with the husband – a lawyer, Richard Low – of his elder brother's widow for the possession of his patrimonial estates, and was ultimately compelled to take a younger brother's portion. Vennar went to prison at least twice during the affair, for allegedly stealing documents and for debt; he thought his reputation had been destroyed, and was determined to rehabilitate himself. In 1600 he proceeded to Scotland, and injudiciously solicited the intervention of James VI with the lords of the council. He had a favourable reception, and composed a thanksgiving for the delivery of James from the Gowrie conspiracy, which was presented to the king. His good reception aroused Queen Elizabeth's anger, and on his return to England he was promptly arrested and imprisoned for a short time "as a dangerous member to the state".

=== The Right Way to Heaven ===
In 1601 appeared The Right Way to Heaven: and the true testimonie of a faithfull and loyall subject. Compiled by Richard Vennard of Lincolnes Inne. Printed by Thomas Este (published in London), a work of a religious character, but abounding in adulation of Queen Elizabeth. The first part was reprinted in the following year with several alterations and additions, with the title The Right Way to Heauen, and a good presedent for Lawyers and all other good Christians. It was reprinted in John Nichols's Progresses of Queen Elizabeth (iii. 532–43). An undated reprint of the second part, The True Testimonie, was preserved in the Bridgewater Library. It is prefaced by a dedication to James I, and contains a thanksgiving for the deliverance of the kingdom from the Gunpowder Plot.

=== England's Joy ===
Not realising much by the sale, Vennar, who had in contemplation a second journey to Scotland, proclaimed his intention of representing England's triumphs over Spain in a masque entitled Englands Ioy. The broadside of the plot is in possession of the Society of Antiquaries of London, and has been reprinted in their Miscellanies (x. 196). He announced in the broadside that it would be represented at the Swan on 6 November 1602, and a large company, including many noblemen, assembled to witness it. After taking the entrance money, however, Vennar disappeared, and the audience revenged themselves by breaking up the furniture. Vennar himself states that he was arrested by bailiffs when the masque was about to begin, but John Chamberlain relates that he fled on horseback, was pursued, captured, and brought before Sir John Popham, who treated the affair as a jest, and bound him over in five pounds to appear at the sessions (Chamberlain, Letters, Camden Soc. p. 163; Hazlitt, Shakespeare Jest Books, 1864, i. 145). The play was eventually staged by William Fennor in 1615.

The episode caused much amusement. Vennar was universally regarded as an impostor and dubbed England's Joy, a name which gave him peculiar annoyance. In 1614 he wrote a vehement protest, entitled An Apology: written by Richard Vennar of Lincolnes Inne, abusively called Englands Joy. To represse the contagious ruptures of the infected multitude. It was printed in London by Nicholas Okes. The work is divided into two parts, of which the first is autobiographical, and the second relates Vennar's exertions to obtain the abolition of imprisonment for debt in England. The only perfect copy extant is in the British Museum Library, but it was reprinted in Collier's Illustrations of Old English Literature (vol. iii.). Collier inaccurately claims that it is the "oldest piece of prose autobiography" in English.

Several allusions to "England's Joy" occur in contemporary literature, particularly in Ben Jonson's Love Restored (1610–11), in his The Masque of Augurs (1622), and in Sir John Suckling's comedy The Goblins (1646). A poem entitled "Englands Joy", R. R., published without date, place, or printer's name, is sometimes attributed to exiled Recusant Richard Verstegan, but was believed by Louise Guiney to be the work of John Vennar. England's Joy commemorated victory against the 4th Spanish Armada sent to Ireland in 1601 culminating in the Battle of Kinsale where the Irish clans under Hugh O'Neill, Earl of Tyrone and Red Hugh O'Donnell were also defeated.

=== Last years ===
In 1606 Vennar was arrested on suspicion of an intention to defraud Sir John Spencer of £500 on pretence of preparing a masque under the patronage of Sir John Watts, the Lord Mayor. After that he avoided London, and lived chiefly in Essex and Kent. He was finally imprisoned for debt in 1614 in Wood Street Compter, where he wrote his Apology, and died. William Fennor wrote that Vennar had objected to fees demanded in the compter and been thrown into the black hole, where "lying without a bedde, hee caught such an extreame cold in his legges, that it was not long before he departed this life". (Fennor, Compters Commonwealth, 1617, pp. 62–64). He was buried at St Michael's Church, Wood Street on 13 October 1615.
