= Hinds =

Hinds may refer to:

== Places ==
- Hinds, New Zealand, a small town
- Hinds County, Mississippi, a US county
- Hinds Lake, a lake in Minnesota
- Hinds River, a river that flows through Hinds, New Zealand

== Other ==
- A plural of deer, especially female deer (does)
- Hinds (surname)
- Hinds (band), a Spanish English-language indie rock band
- F. Hinds, a nationwide jewellery chain in the UK
- Hinds, a brand of hand cream popular in Mexico and Argentina owned by GlaxoSmithKline
- Hinds Community College, Raymond, Mississippi, US
- Hinds House, a historic building in Santa Cruz, California, US

== See also ==
- Hind (disambiguation)
