= Compter =

Type of small English prison

A compter, sometimes referred to as a counter, was a type of small English prison controlled by a sheriff. The inmates were usually civil prisoners, for example dissenters and debtors. Examples of compters include London's Wood Street Compter, Poultry Compter, Giltspur Street Compter and Borough Compter and the lock-up over the Abbey Gateway, next to St Laurence's church, in Reading, Berkshire (this was the Compter Gate and the lock-up was known as the Compter).

The Compter's Commonwealth (1617), by William Fennor, was a work written from the author's experience of imprisonment at London's Wood Street Compter, and is regarded by many historians as one of the principal primary sources for assessment of English 16th-century prison conditions.
