= David Walser =

David Walser (12 March 1923 – 1 October 1993) was a priest in the Church of England.

Walser was educated at Clayesmore School. During World War II he served with the Royal Artillery after which he studied at St Edmund Hall, Oxford and St Stephen's House. He was ordained in 1951. After a curacy at St Gregory the Great's Horfield he was vice-principal of St Stephen's House. He was a minor canon of Ely Cathedral from 1961 to 1971 when he became the Rector of Linton. He became Rector of St Botolph's Church, Cambridge and Archdeacon of Ely in 1981 and died shortly after retiring in 1993.

Church of England titles
Preceded by John Sanderson Long	Archdeacon of Ely; 1981–1993	Succeeded by Jeffrey John Seagrief Watson
