= John Parker (priest) =

English Anglican priest

John Parker was an English Anglican priest in the 16th century.

Jones was educated at Christ Church, Oxford. He held livings at Fen Ditton, Stretham and Bluntisham. He was archdeacon of Ely from 1568 until his death on 26 May 1592.
