= William MacKennal =

The Ven William Leavers MacKennal (2 February 1881 – 20 June 1947) was an eminent Anglican priest in the first half of the 20th century.

He was educated at Rugby and Trinity College, Cambridge. He was ordained in 1908 and held curacies at Great St Mary's, Cambridge and St George, Dunster. A Chaplain to the Forces from 1915 to 1918, when peace returned he held incumbencies at Compton Martin, Chesterton, Cambridge, Kirkby Lonsdale and Hitchin. He became Archdeacon of Ely in 1942, a post he held until his death.

Church of England titles
Preceded by Horace MacCartie Eyre Price	Archdeacon of Ely; 1942–1947	Succeeded by Herbert Kirkpatrick
