= John Hinde =

John Hinde may refer to:

- John Hinde (broadcaster) (1911–2006), Australian broadcaster
- John Hinde (photographer) (1916–1997), English photographer
- John Hinde (rowing) (1928–2017), English coxswain
- John Hinde Palmer (1808–1884), English barrister and Liberal Party politician

== See also ==
- John Hind (disambiguation)
