= Melinda Zook =

Historian, academic and author

Melinda S. Zook
- Born: 1960 (age 65–66)
- Occupations: Historian; academic; author

Academic background
- Education: George Washington University; Georgetown University

Academic work
- Institutions: Purdue University

Melinda S. Zook is a historian, academic, and author. She is the Director of Cornerstone Integrated Liberal Arts within the College of Liberal Arts and the Germaine Seelye Oesterle Professor of History in the Department of History at Purdue University.

Zook's research spans the history of political thought, religion, and women in early modern Britain, with published articles covering topics such as radical politics, martyrdom, political poetry, women, religion, and teaching. She has authored two books titled Radical Whigs & Conspiratorial Politics in Late Stuart England and Protestantism, Politics, and Women in Britain, 1660–1714, the latter of which was awarded the Best Book on Gender for 2013 by the Society for the Study of Early Modern Women. She is also the co-editor of Revolutionary Currents: Nation Building in the Transatlantic World, Challenging Orthodoxies: The Social and Cultural World of Early Modern Women, and Generations of Women Historians: Within and Beyond the Academy. In addition, she has received awards from Purdue University including the Mortar Board Society Helen B. Schleman Gold Medallion Award in 2019 and the Charles B. Murphy Outstanding Undergraduate Teaching Award in 2022.

== Education ==
Zook attained her Bachelor of Arts degree from George Washington University in 1983, with a major in English Literature. This was followed by a Master of Arts degree focusing on Modern Europe from George Washington University in 1985. Later, she received her PhD degree from Georgetown University in 1993, specializing in Early Modern Europe and England.

== Career ==
Zook began her career at Purdue University as an assistant professor of history in 1993. She then became an associate professor in 1999 and was appointed to full-rank position of Professor of History in 2013. She has been holding an appointment as a Germaine Seelye Oesterle Professor of History in the Department of History at Purdue University since 2022.

Zook served as the Director of Undergraduate Studies in the Department of History at Purdue University from 2001 to 2004 and as the President of the Midwest Conference on British Studies from 2005 to 2007.

=== Model for general education ===
Along with seven liberal arts faculty members, Zook developed the Cornerstone Integrated Liberal Arts program. The program opens with a gateway sequence, Transformative Texts, for first-year Purdue students, taught by full-time faculty. In her article titled "Gen Z Is Ready to Talk. Are Professors Ready to Listen?", she discussed the model for general education, which employs small, general-education courses centered around "transformative texts" to actively engage students in debates, workshops, and projects. It emphasizes faculty mentorship and student support, acknowledging challenges, particularly those intensified by COVID-19. Steven Mintz, an American historian, remarked, "Their Cornerstone certificate program offers first-year students an experience somewhat analogous to that provided by Honors Colleges." Students also learn that the "boundaries of race, gender, and cultural difference can be crossed by exercising the sympathetic imagination." In this respect, writes Sarah Bray, "The Cornerstone classroom is a rehearsal space for democracy."

Cornerstone is recognized by the National Endowment for the Humanities (NEH) as a national model for revitalizing interest in the humanities and fostering lifelong learning through its approach to general education. In 2020, the NEH and the Teagle Foundation partnered to enhance college general education through the Cornerstone program, announcing $7 million for the replication initiative named "Cornerstone: Learning for Living". Expanding to other campuses, the program enhances liberal arts for STEM-focused students, with $1.625 million in grants awarded to 21 institutions in 2021 as part of this effort.

This work has been covered by media outlets such as The Washington Post, The New York Times, The Chronicle of Higher Education, Town and Country, LearningWell Magazine, and Inside Philanthropy.

== Research ==
Zook's research areas encompass early modern European history, with a focus on Tudor-Stuart England, political thought, culture, and women and gender studies.

=== Works ===
Zook has authored books including Radical Whigs and Conspiratorial Politics in Late Stuart England which focused on England's political landscape during the 1670s–1680s, examining a network of radical conspirators seeking a Protestant monarchy succession. She emphasized the grassroots origins of liberalism, tracing its development in London's social hubs and arguing for its defense on the streets amid adversity. William E. Burns in his review of this book said, "Certainly this volume is evidence of how rich their efforts have been." Her book, Protestantism, Politics and Women in Britain, was awarded Best Book on Gender for 2013 by the Society for the Study of Early Modern Women. It examined the role of women in late seventeenth and early eighteenth-century British politics, highlighting their effort to protecting the Protestant faith both domestically and internationally. Susan Wiseman, upon reviewing this book, remarked that "This study is an important contribution to the thinking on Protestant women in the period 1660–1714."

Zook co-edited Generations of Women Historians: Within and Beyond the Academy with Hilda L. Smith, among other works. This book, a collection of essays, explored the historical journey of early women historians, revealing how societal and intellectual factors shaped their lives and careers. It highlighted their contributions over four centuries and the distinct challenges they encountered in academia compared to men. In Challenging Orthodoxies, co-edited with Sigrun Haude, she explored diverse perspectives on early modern women's experiences, challenging conventional narratives across various realms. Emma Major in her review for Interactive Journal for Women in the Arts stated, "This excellent collection of essays in honor of Hilda L. Smith is full of surprises and scholarly delights."

Co-edited with Michael Morrison, Zook's book Revolutionary Currents analyzed the global crosscurrents of revolutionary ideologies and highlighted the impact of transatlantic interactions on shaping modern revolutions. Doina Pasca Harsanyi from Central Michigan University noted, "This volume will be a valuable contribution to any discussion of the dynamic interplay between the ramifications of historical attempts at nation-building and the current march towards globalization."

== Awards and honors ==
- 2016 – Kenneth T. Kofmehl Outstanding Undergraduate Teaching Award, Purdue University
- 2018 – Purdue University Faculty Scholar, Purdue University
- 2018 – Jon C. Teaford Faculty Award, Purdue University
- 2019 – Helen B. Schleman Gold Medallion Award, Purdue University Mortar Board Society
- 2022 – Charles B. Murphy Outstanding Undergraduate Teaching Award, Purdue University

== Bibliography ==
=== Books ===
- Radical Whigs and Conspiratorial Politics in Late Stuart England (1999) ISBN 978-0271028415
- Revolutionary Currents: Nation Building in the Transatlantic World (2004) ISBN 978-0742521650
- Protestantism, Politics, and Women in Britain, 1660–1714 (2013) ISBN 978-1137303196
- Challenging Orthodoxies: The Social and Cultural Worlds of Early Modern Women (2016) ISBN 978-1409457084
- Generations of Women Historians: Within and Beyond the Academy (2018) ISBN 978-3319775678

=== Selected articles ===
- Zook, M. S. (2002). Integrating Men's History into Women's History: A Proposition. The History Teacher, 35(3), 373–387. Integrating Men's History into Women's History: A Proposition
- Zook, M. S. (2002) The Restoration Remembered: The First Whigs and the Making of their History, The Seventeenth Century, 17(2), 213–234, The Restoration Remembered: The First Whigs and the Making of their History
- Zook, M. S. (2004). The political poetry of Aphra Behn. The Cambridge Companion to Aphra Behn, 46–67.
- Zook, M. S. (2008). The Shocking Death of Mary II: Gender & Political Crisis in Late Stuart England. British Scholar, 1(1), 21–36.
- Zook, M. S. (2009). Turncoats and Double Agents in Restoration and Revolutionary England: The Case of Robert Ferguson, the Plotter. Eighteenth-Century Studies, 42(3), 363–378. Turncoats and Double Agents in Restoration and Revolutionary England: The Case of Robert Ferguson, the Plotter
- Zook, M. (2021). 3 ‘Blood will have Blood’: The Regicide Trials and the Popular Press. In B. Cowan, S. Sowerby, B. Cowan, M. Goldie, T. Harris, N. Newton Key, M. Knights, J. Marshall, A. McKenzie, P. Monod, A. Patterson, S. Sowerby & S. Taylor (Ed.), The State Trials and the Politics of Justice in Later Stuart England (pp. 73–92). Boydell and Brewer: Boydell and Brewer. 3 ‘Blood will have Blood’: The Regicide Trials and the Popular Press
