= Giltspur Street Compter =

Former prison in the City of London

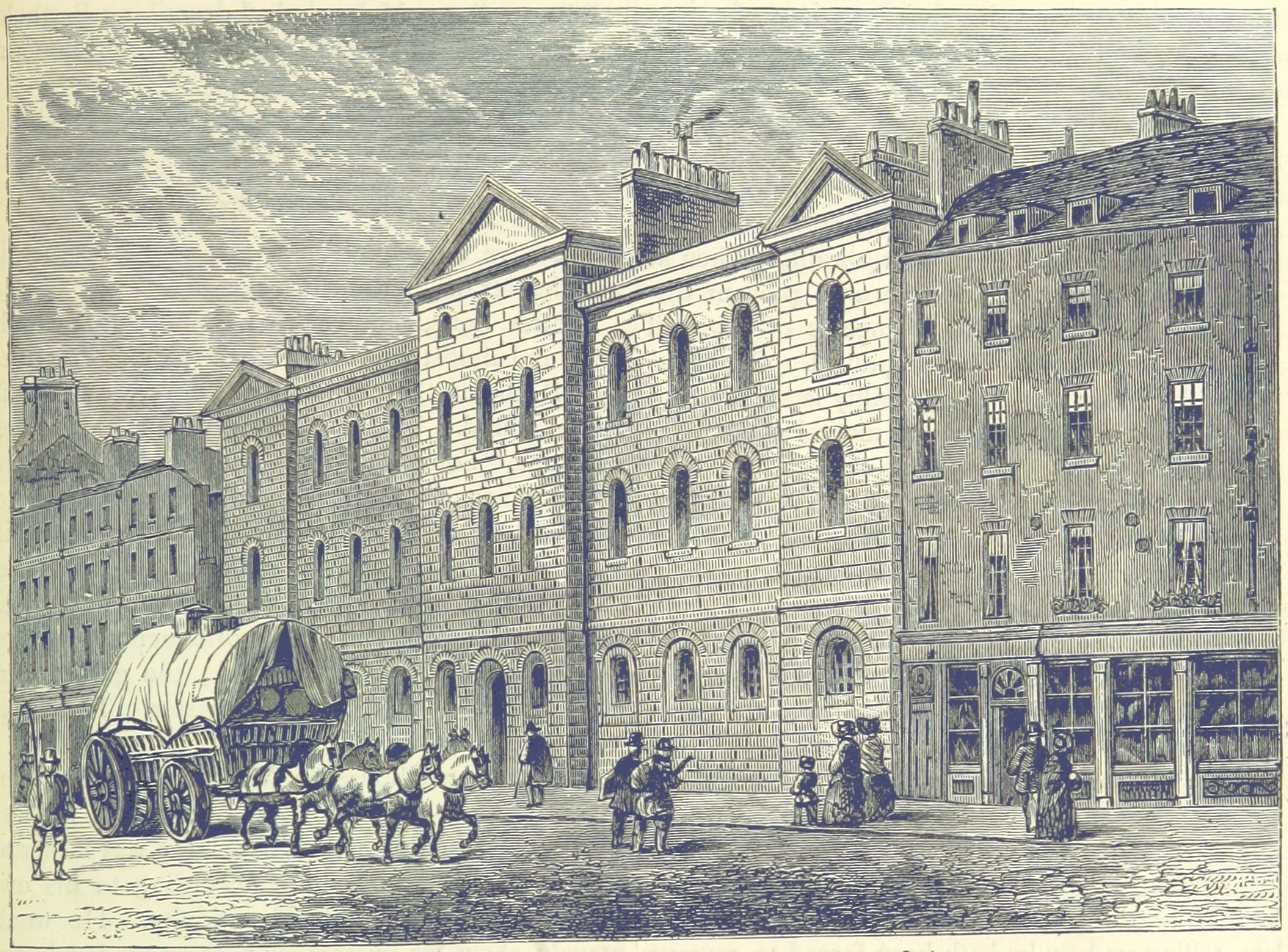
- Giltspur Street Compter, 1840
- Interactive map of Giltspur Street Compter
- Location: London; 51.5165°N 0.1016°W
- Status: Closed
- Opened: 1791
- Closed: 1853

Notable prisoners
- Robert Wedderburn

The Giltspur Street Compter was a compter or small prison, designed by English architect and surveyor George Dance the Younger, mainly used to hold debtors. It was in Giltspur Street, Smithfield, close to Newgate, in the City of London, between 1791 and 1853.

The compter was adjacent to Christ's Hospital Boys' School (1553–1902). Its construction began in 1787, and was ready for occupation in 1791. In 1815 it took some prisoners from the nearby Poultry Compter prior to its closure. The Giltspur Street prison was itself closed in 1853 and demolished in 1854, the site being later occupied by the King Edward Buildings Royal Mail Sorting Office.

== Inmates ==
In 1831, Robert Wedderburn (radical) was arrested and sent to Giltspur Street Compter as he continued to campaign for freedom of speech, antislavery and working-class revolution.
