= Charles Hardwick (priest) =

English historian and a priest of the Church of England

The Reverend Charles Hardwick
- Born: 22 September 1821; Slingsby, North Yorkshire, England
- Died: 18 August 1859 (aged 37)

Charles Hardwick (22 September 1821 – 18 August 1859) was an English historian and a priest of the Church of England who became the Archdeacon of Ely.

== Life ==
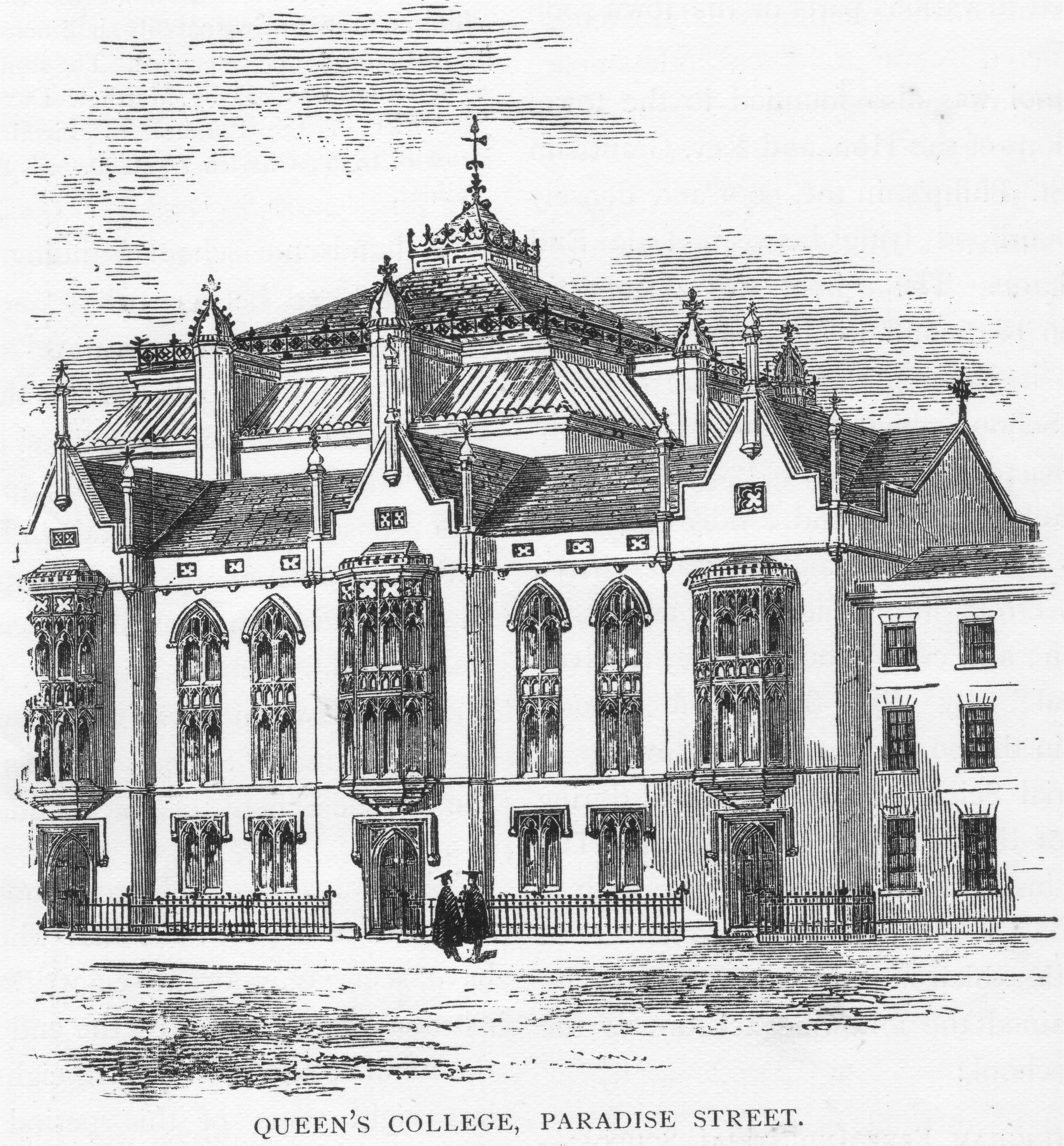
Queen's College, Birmingham, a predecessor college of the University of Birmingham

Hardwick was born in Slingsby, North Yorkshire, the son of Charles Hardwick, a joiner. After receiving some instruction at Slingsby, Malton, and Sheffield, he acted for a short time as an usher at schools in Thornton and Malton and as an assistant to the Revd Henry Barlow at Shirland rectory in Derbyshire.

In October 1840, Hardwick unsuccessfully competed for a sizarship at St John's College, Cambridge. He became a pensioner and afterwards a minor scholar of St Catharine's Hall and was the first senior optime in January 1844. After being a tutor for the family of Sir Joseph Radcliffe, 2nd Baronet in Brussels, he was elected as a fellow of his college in 1845. He was ordained deacon in 1846 and priest in 1847, in which year also he proceeded M.A.

He was select preacher at Cambridge for 1850 and in March 1851 became preacher at the Chapel Royal, Whitehall. From March to September 1853 he was a professor of divinity at Queen's College, Birmingham (a predecessor college of Birmingham University). In 1855 he was appointed a lecturer in divinity at King's College, Cambridge, and Christian advocate in the university. In 1856 he was elected a member of the newly established council of the senate and was re-elected in 1858. For some years he was the secretary of the university branch association of the Society for the Propagation of the Gospel and promoted the proposed Oxford and Cambridge mission to Central Africa.

In 1859 he became the Archdeacon of Ely and commenced his BD degree. On 18 August of that year he was killed by falling over a precipice in the Pyrenees. A monument was erected on the spot. He was buried on 21 August in the cemetery at Luchon.

== Works ==
During 1846 he edited Sir Roger Twysden's Historical Vindication of the Church of England, and edited as a supplement Francis Fullwood's Roma ruit in 1847. He next edited for the Percy Society (vol. xxviii.) A Poem on the Times of Edward II (1849), and an Anglo-Saxon Passion of St. George, with a translation (1850).

He was editor-in-chief of the Catalogue of the Manuscripts preserved in the Library of the University of Cambridge, contributing descriptions of Early English literature. The first three volumes appeared in 1856, 1857 and 1858 respectively. In 1849 he read before the Cambridge Antiquarian Society An Historical Inquiry touching Saint Catherine of Alexandria (printed with a Semi-Saxon Legend in vol. xv. of the society's quarto series). In 1850 he helped to edit the Book of Homilies for the university press, under the supervision of George Elwes Corrie, who had been his tutor.

His History of the Articles of Religion first appeared in 1851, and a second edition, mostly rewritten, in 1859. In 1853 he printed Twenty Sermons for Town Congregations, a selection from his Whitehall sermons, and A History of the Christian Church, Middle Age, a third edition of which by William Stubbs was issued in 1872. In his role as Christian advocate he published Christ and other Masters: an historical inquiry into some of the chief parallelisms and contrasts between Christianity and the Religious Systems of the ancient world, 4 pts. 1855–9; 2nd edit., with a memoir of the author by Francis Procter, 2 vols. 1863.

Early in 1856 he published the second volume of his History of the Christian Church, embracing the Reformation period. For the university press he completed in 1858 an edition of the Anglo-Saxon and Northumbrian versions of St. Matthew's Gospel, commenced by John Mitchell Kemble; and edited for the Master of the Rolls the Latin History of the Monastery of St. Augustine, Canterbury, preserved in the library of Trinity Hall.

== Sources ==
- This article incorporates text from a publication now in the public domain: Goodwin, Gordon (1890). "Hardwick, Charles (1821-1859)". In Stephen, Leslie; Lee, Sidney (eds.). Dictionary of National Biography. Vol. 24. London: Smith, Elder & Co. pp. 347–348.
