= Hugh Hind =

British and Rhodesian soldier

Hugh "Chuck" Hind (died 28 January 1977) was a former SAS soldier who allegedly assassinated the Chairman of ZANU, Herbert Chitepo.

Hind served with the British SAS during the 1960s. He was awarded the Queen's Commendation for Brave Conduct for rescuing a young child from the River Wye in Hereford. Hind jumped into the water when it was flooded with heavy rains, reviving the rescued child with mouth-to-mouth resuscitation.

Hind emigrated to Rhodesia and, working with another Rhodesian Central Intelligence Organisation operative, known only as "Taffy" Brice, they performed a series of raids into Zambia, against ZANU and ZAPU targets during the Rhodesian Bush War. Taffy and Hind were assisted in Zambia by a white Zambian farmer, Ian Robert Bruce Sutherland.

Herbert Chitepo was assassinated on 17 March 1975 in Lusaka, Zambia, allegedly by Hind and Brice. They are said to have placed a car bomb in his Volkswagen Beetle. The explosion sent part of the car onto the roof of his house and uprooted a tree next door.

Hind died in a motor vehicle collision in January 1977. While transporting weapons near Lusaka, the vehicle skidded and left the road; Sutherland was also in the car at the time but survived.

Zambian police raided Sutherland's farm in Mazabuka on 22 November 1978, after which he was tried and convicted of illegally possessing offensive material, and sentenced to 5 years in prison.

== Sources ==
- Martin, David; Johnson, Phyllis (1985). The Chitepo Assassination. Zimbabwe Publishing House. ISBN 978-0-949225-04-7.
- Sithole, Masipula (September 1985). "Review of The Chitepo Assassination by David Martin, Phyllis Johnso". The Journal of Modern African Studies. 23 (3). Cambridge: University Press. doi:10.1017/s0022278x00057323. ISSN 0022-278X. JSTOR 160675. S2CID 153781289.
- Stiff, Peter (2012). See You in November: The Story of Alan 'Taffy' Brice - an SAS Assassin. Galago. ISBN 978-1-919854-36-6.
- White, Luise (2003). The Assassination of Herbert Chitepo: Texts and Politics in Zimbabwe. Indiana University Press. ISBN 0-253-21608-7.
