= Frank Hinde =

Irish-born English cricketer

Personal information
- Full name: Frank Langford Hinde
- Born: 5 April 1869; Rathfarnham, Leinster, Ireland
- Died: 22 August 1931 (aged 62); Reigate, Surrey, England
- Batting: Right-handed

Domestic team information
- Years: Team
- 1895: Gloucestershire

Career statistics
Competition	First-class
Matches	1
Runs scored	5
Batting average	2.50
100s/50s	–/–
Top score	3
Catches/stumpings	–/–
- Source: Cricinfo, 8 August 2012

Frank Langford Hinde (5 April 1869 – 22 August 1931) was an Irish-born English cricketer. Hinde was a right-handed batsman. He was born at Rathfarnham, Leinster.

Hinde made a single first-class debut for Gloucestershire against Sussex in the 1895 County Championship at the County Ground, Hove.

Hinde died at Reigate, Surrey, on 22 August 1931.
