= John Traske =

English dissenting minister

John Traske (c. 1585–1636) was an English Puritan clergyman and prominent sabbatarian preacher. He led a short-lived separatist congregation, often referred to as Traskeites, distinctive for their Judaizing practices, including seventh-day Sabbatarianism and the observation of Jewish dietary laws.

== Early life ==
Traske was likely born in Somerset around 1585 (he stated that he was about 32 years old in 1617). Nothing certain is known about his parents except for Traske's later statement that they were "godly."

After working as a schoolmaster in Somerset, he was ordained in 1611, becoming the curate of Chilton Cantelo. He was soon suspended for preaching without a license, and he moved to Axminster, where he may have served as chaplain to Sir John Drake. By 1614, he had become an itinerant preacher and was accused by diocesan courts of preaching without a license around the Isle of Ely and Somerset.

== Judaizing controversy ==
By late 1615, Traske arrived in London, where, according to one observer, he "marched like Jehu most furiously, making divisions in the Church around London" and began to attract a significant following, teaching a radical variation on Puritan preparationist ideas. Traske taught that all people could be categorized as being either in a state of nature, repentance, or grace. Those in a state of repentance, he was reported to have taught, must practice self-mortification, including fasting, sexual abstinence, hard labor, and similar practices. This would eventually lead to a state of grace, in which the elect would obtain an assurance of their election, be able to recognize the other elect, and become incapable of sin.

The elect, Traske taught, would have no need for external discipline or a church hierarchy, as they would follow the inward law to hold all things in common and obey Mosaic laws as written in scripture, including Jewish dietary laws. It has been suggested that obedience to Jewish law was a way for Traske's followers to separate themselves from reprobate English society.

Traske appointed four followers, including a tailor named Hamlet Jackson, Returne Hebdon (the son of a Sussex gentleman), and two others, as apostles to teach others. He and his followers emphasized the interpretation of dreams, such that in around 1617, Hamlet Jackson reportedly had a vision directing that the Sabbath should be kept on Saturday. Traske soon accepted the idea and began to teach it himself.

Around this time, in February 1617, Traske married his second wife Dorothy Coombe, one of his followers and an unlicensed schoolteacher.

This "Judaizing in matters of dayes and meats" led authorities to arrest Traske and several of his followers, including his wife, in November 1617, when they were tried before the Court of High Commission. Traske and his followers were treated harshly in prison, and were given only bread, water, and pig's meat (which Traske refused to eat). Traske wrote several letters to James I complaining about his treatment and defending his beliefs, referring to the king using the familiar "thou" and "thy."

Though Traske's refusal to eat black pudding initially amused the king, he took a darker view of Traske as the letters continued. In 1618, Traske was brought before the court of the Star Chamber for "an imediate detraccion and scandall upon the Kinges most Excellent Majesty in the highest degree" for having "insolently and presumptuously" written to him, as well as for making "foule and false accusacions" of cruelty against the Bishops and court of High Commission and for "a sedicious practice and purpose to divert his Majesties subjectes from theire obedience to followe him and his Jewish opinions."

Traske was sentenced to life imprisonment, public whipping, and a £1000 fine. His ear was nailed to the pillory, and his forehead branded with the letter 'J'. In his speech to the judges, Sir Francis Bacon emphasized the danger of "new opinions," noting that apprentices were learning Hebrew as evidence for the danger of Traske's ideas.

== Later life ==
In 1620, about eighteen months after his public whipping and branding was carried out, Traske published a recantation of his belief in Mosaic dietary laws and seventh-day Sabbatarianism, and he was released from Fleet Prison. Once again free, Traske traveled around London, Dorset, and Gloucestershire preaching antinomianism, but without the Judaizing elements that had led to his previous arrest.

Unlike her husband, Traske's wife Dorothy refused to recant and remained in prison, where she continued to promote seventh-day Sabbatarianism and adherence to Mosaic law until her death. She reportedly asked to be buried in a field rather than in a churchyard. Hebdon likewise died in prison in 1625. Jackson, meanwhile, was released from prison, whereupon he and another follower left for Amsterdam to convert to Judaism.

Traske himself joined an Independent congregation in Southwark originally led by Henry Jacob in the 1630s. In 1636, he illegally published The True Gospel Vindicated, which David Como has called "the only book of overtly antinomian theology to reach print prior to 1641." When he was once again arrested that year, he insisted on a hearing by the Lord Mayor, who sent him to jail. Soon after his release, he died and was buried in Lambeth churchyard.

== Works ==
- A pearle for a prince, or a princely pearle. As it was delivered in two sermons (1615)
- Heavens ioy, or, Heaven begun upon earth (1616)
- Christs kingdome discovered: or, That the true church of God is in England, cleerly made manifest against all sectaries whatsoever (1616)
- A treatise of libertie from Judaisme, or An acknowledgement of true Christian libertie (1620)
- The power of preaching. Or, the powerfull effects of the word truely preached, and rightly applyed as it was delivered in one or more sermons (1623)
- The True Gospel Vindicated, from the Reproach of a New Gospel (1636)
