= Archdeacon of Cambridge =

Church of England ecclesiastical office

The Archdeacon of Cambridge is a senior ecclesiastical officer in the Diocese of Ely. The archdeacon is responsible for some clergy discipline and pastoral care in the Archdeaconry of Cambridge.

The archdeaconry has existed, as the Archdeaconry of Ely, since (at the latest) the early 12th century (before the creation of Ely diocese in 1109, the archdeaconry was in Lincoln diocese), but was renamed to Cambridge in July 2006.

== List of archdeacons ==
All called Archdeacon of Ely unless otherwise noted.

=== High Medieval ===
- bef. 1106–1110 (d.): Nicholas (Archdeacon of Cambridge, Huntingdon and Hertford in Lincoln diocese; also called archdeacon of Lincoln)
- 1110–bef. 1152 (d. or dep.): William Brito
- bef. 1151–c. 1158 (d.): William of Lavington (also called Archdeacon of Cambridge)
- c. 1158–1189 (res.): Richard FitzNeal (also Dean of Lincoln from 1184)
- bef. 1190–aft. 1202: Richard Barre
- c. 1210–aft. 1215 (res.): Stephen Ridel
- aft. 1215–6 November 1219 (d.): Adam de Tilneia
- c. 1225–aft. 1233: Giles
- bef. 1238–aft. 1248: Robert of Leicester
- bef. 1249–1266 (res.): Nicholas of Ely
- bef. 1267–aft. 1267: John de Balsham
- bef. 1272–March 1289 (res.): Ralph Walpole
- bef. 1291–aft. 1291 (sur.): John de Oseville
- bef. 1292–aft. 1292: Ralph de Foderingeye
- bef. 1302–aft. 1302: Adam

=== Late Medieval ===
- bef. 1306–aft. 1306: Ralph de Fodringhey (again)
- bef. 1313–September 1326 (d.): William Cardinal de Testa
  (Cardinal-priest of San Ciriaco alle Terme Diocleziane)
- bef. 1329–bef. 1335 (res.): Gilbert de Bruer
- 18 October–bef. November 1335: Richard de Bentworth
- aft. November 1335 – 1344 (res.): John de Ufford
- 1344–20 December 1356 (d.): Gaillard Cardinal de la Motte (Pope's man;
  Cardinal-deacon of St Lucia in Silice)
- 27 October 1344 – 1348 (res.): Stephen de Ketelbergh (Bishop's man)
- 1351: Bernard de Caulason (Royal grant)
- 4 February 1357–bef. 1358 (d.): James de Beaufort (Royal grant)
- 18 April 1357–?: Nicholas Cardinal Roselli de Tarragona (Papal grant;
  Cardinal-priest of St Sixtus)
- 27 April 1363 – 29 October 1369 (d.): Androynus Cardinal de la Roche
  (Cardinal-priest of St Marcellus)
- 28 October 1373 – 4 March 1380 (exch.): Edward Burnell
- 4 March 1380–bef. 1387 (d.): John Crischirch
- 20–28 May 1387 (exch.): Thomas de Pattesele
- 28 May 1387 – 1388 (res.): Thomas Dalby
- 14 September 1388 – 29 August 1394 (exch.): Thomas Ferriby
- 29 August 1394 – 23 February 1397 (exch.): Richard Clifford
- 23 February–October 1397 (exch.): Adam Mottrum
- October 1397–aft. 1409: John Welbourne
- bef. 1410–1412 (d.): John Metford
- bef. 1418–c. 1445 (d.): Richard Wetheryngesete
- 15 March 1445–bef. 1467 (d.): John Stokes
- 5 February 1467–bef. 1477 (d.): Richard Bole
- 30 September 1477–bef. 1480: Richard Robinson
- bef. 1480–17 August 1496: Thomas Morton
- 18 August 1496 – 9 November 1527 (res.): Thomas Alcock
- 9 November 1527–bef. 1534 (d.): Nicholas Hawkins
- bef. May 1534 – 1540 (res.): Thomas Thirlby
- 24 December 1540–September 1553 (deprived): Richard Cox

=== Early modern ===
- 25 October 1553 – 1556 (res.): Henry Cole
- bef. 1557–bef. 1559 (deprived): John Boxall
- 1560 (res.): John Warner
- 29 February 1560–bef. 1568 (d.): Robert Wisdom
- 21 October 1568 – 26 May 1592 (d.): John Parker
- 5 June 1592–aft. 1594: John Palmer
- 17 June 1600–bef. 1616 (d.): Robert Tinley
- 16 March 1617–bef. 1646: Daniel Wigmore
- 4 February 1647–bef. 1652 (d.): Edmund Mapletoft
- 2 July 1660 – 29 March 1663 (d.): Bernard Hale
- 8 April 1663–bef. 1679 (d.): Thomas Wren
- 8 November 1679 – 22 January 1681 (res.): Barnabas Oley
- 22 January 1681 – 9 June 1701 (d.): William Saywell
- 12 June 1701 – 14 July 1742 (d.): Richard Bentley
- 16 September 1742 – 18 October 1751 (d.): Robert Eyton
- 20 December 1751 – 14 September 1779 (d.): Charles Plumptre
- 18 October 1779 – 4 July 1816 (d.): Richard Watson (also Bishop of Llandaff from 1782)
- 23 September 1816 – 2 November 1858 (d.): Henry Browne

=== Late modern ===
- 1859–18 August 1859 (d.): Charles Hardwick
- 1865–1907 (ret.): William Emery
- 1907–10 June 1919 (d.): William Cunningham
- 1919–21 November 1941 (d.): Horace Price, Assistant Bishop
- 1942–20 June 1947 (d.): William MacKennal
- 1947–1961 (ret.): Herbert Kirkpatrick
- 1962–1970 (res.): Michael Carey
- 1970–1981 (ret.): John Long (afterwards archdeacon emeritus)
- 1981–1993 (ret.): David Walser (afterwards archdeacon emeritus)
- 1993–2004 (ret.): Jeffrey Watson (afterwards archdeacon emeritus)
- 2004–14 March 2014 (ret.): John Beer

In 2005, Beer's title was changed to Archdeacon of Cambridge.

- 16 September 2014–present: Alex Hughes

== Sources ==
- Greenway, Diana E. (1971), Fasti Ecclesiae Anglicanae 1066–1300, vol. 2, pp. 50–52
- Jones, B. (1963), Fasti Ecclesiae Anglicanae 1300–1541, vol. 4, pp. 17–19
- Horn, Joyce M. (1992), Fasti Ecclesiae Anglicanae 1541–1857, vol. 7, pp. 13–14
