= Mavis Hinds =

English meteorologist (1929–2009)

- Born: 1929
- Died: June 2009 (aged 79–80)
- Education: University College London
- Occupation: Meteorologist

Mavis Kathleen Hinds (1929–2009) was an English meteorologist who, together with Fred Bushby, pioneered the use of computers to carry out meteorological calculations in the UK. She studied Mathematics at University College London and on graduating joined the UK Meteorological (Met) Office in 1951, attending their Initial Forecasting Course that year. She went on to work with Bushby in using the Lyons Electronic Office (LEO), an early computer developed by J. Lyons & Co, becoming an expert in writing, running and correcting computer programs for weather forecasting. She was seen at that time as one of the first prominent female meteorologists and also the first to play a leading role in the development of numerical weather prediction, both in the UK and worldwide.

== Early life and education ==
Hinds passed her Higher School Certificate in pure mathematics, applied mathematics and physics. This was an ideal combination of subjects for the study of meteorology in which she was already developing an interest. On the strength of her examination results, she was awarded a scholarship and a place to read Mathematics at University College London.

== Research and career ==
From 1951 Hinds worked at the UK Met Office as part of their Forecast Research Division, which had been set up in 1949 in Dunstable. Hinds, as part of the Division, was instrumental in the development of numerical weather prediction (NWP). The earliest days of NWP in the late 1940s relied on hand calculation, but as electronic computing machines began to be developed in the US (ENIAC) and the UK (EDSAC and LEO), NWP grew in reliability and prevalence. In 1954, at a meeting of the Royal Meteorological Society, Fred Bushby and Hinds presented the first computer-based baroclinic forecast in Europe. Since 1951, they had been making use of the computing power of LEO, the world's first business computer, developed by J. Lyons & Co caterers.

Because in the early 1950s the UK Met Office had no in-house computing facilities, calculating power had to be obtained from part-time use of LEO and the Ferranti Mark 1 Star at the University of Manchester. Use of these very early computers involved working unsociable hours when the machines were not being used by others. Throughout the 1950s and 1960s, Hinds worked with Bushby and others on a series of published papers that detailed the developments made.

In 1981, Hinds reflected on the impact of computing on weather prediction and in 1994 contributed a chapter about the history of Met Office computerisation to Peter Bird's book on the development of the LEO computers.

Hinds later worked in management roles before her retirement in 1989.
