= Hind Azouz =

Tunisian writer, announcer and radio producer

Hind Azouz (sometimes Azzuz) (August 18, 1926 – February 8, 2015) was a Tunisian writer.

Born in Tunis, Azouz was an autodidact. She published short stories and essays in a variety of organs during her career, including al-Hayah al-thaqafiya, al-Fikr, Qisas, al-Idha'a, al-Mar'a, al-Tarbiya al-shamila, al-'Amal, and al-Sabah; she also published a volume of short stories, Fi-l-darb-al-tawil (On the Long Road), in 1969. She received numerous medals from the government of Tunisia during her career, including the Medal of Culture, the Medal of Employment, and the Medal of National Struggle; she was also awarded certificates by numerous other groups. She belonged to the Tunisian Writers' Union and the Story Club in Tunis, and was secretary to the women's arm of the Democratic Constitutional Rally. Employed by Tunisia's national radio broadcaster as an announcer, she also headed its projects department. Her stories touch upon themes of interest to middle-class women, and cover such controversial topics as birth control and abortion. She was recognized as a pioneer in the field of broadcasting during her career.
