= HMS Hind =

Eighteen ships of the Royal Navy have borne the name HMS Hind or HMS Hynd:

- English ship Hind (1545) was a 28-gun vessel built in 1545 and sold in 1555.
- English ship Hind (1643) was an 18-gun ship purchased in 1643 and listed until 1651. She was in Royalist hands between 1648 and 1649.
- English ship Hind (1655) was an 8-gun ketch launched in 1655 and wrecked in 1668.
- HMS Hind (1672) was a 6-gun dogger captured from the Dutch in 1672 and recaptured by them in 1674.
- HMS Hind (1691) was a 10-gun ketch launched in 1691 captured by the French in 1697.
- HMS Hind (1709) was a 12-gun sixth rate purchased in 1709 and lost to a stranding later that year.
- HMS Hind (1709) was a 16-gun sixth rate captured in 1709. She bilged on her anchor in 1711 and sank.
- HMS Hind (1711) was a 20-gun sixth rate launched in 1711 and wrecked in 1721. The ship struck a rock "half a musket shot" off Guernsey castle on 7 December 1721, and 21 hands were lost including the Captain Fuzzard. The loss was attributed to the "ignorance of the pilot". 94 of the ship's company were saved. Amongst those rescued was the ship's surgeon, Mr Forkington, "who was laid up with the gout, but made shift to swim to a rock not far distant, and the cold baths that endangered his life, hath effectively cured his said distemper." The pilot was tried and found guilty, and was sentenced to three years imprisonment and loss of pay.
- HMS Hind (1741) was a sloop launched in 1741 and sold in 1743.
- HMS Hind (1744) was a 14-gun sloop launched in 1744. She foundered in 1747.
- HMS Hind (1749) was a 24-gun sixth rate launched in 1749. She became a storeship in 1783 and foundered in the Bay of Lopness in 1788.
- HMS Hind (1785) was a 28-gun sixth rate launched in 1785 and broken up in 1811.
- HMS Hind (1790) was a 10-gun tender, launched in 1790 as a revenue cutter. As a naval cutter she captured several privateers, participated in the battle of Navarino, and was sold in 1844.
- HMS Hind (1814) was a 20-gun sixth rate, built as HMS Barbadoes, but renamed before being launched in 1814. She was sold in 1829.
- HMS Hind (1855) was a Dapper-class wooden screw gunboat launched in 1855 and broken up in 1872.
- HMS Hind (1880) was a coastguard yawl launched in 1880 and wrecked in 1900.
- HMS Hind (1911) was an Acheron-class destroyer launched in 1911, sold in 1921 and broken up in 1924.
- HMS Hind (U39) was a Modified Black Swan-class sloop launched in 1943 and broken up in 1958.

== See also ==
- Golden Hind
