= Hind Al-Abadleh =

Emirati chemist (1977 or 1978 – 2025)

- Born: 1977 or 1978
- Died: 9 January 2025 (aged 47)
- Education: United Arab Emirates University (BSc); Iowa University (PhD)
- Scientific career
- Fields: Environmental chemistry
- Workplaces: Wilfrid Laurier University; University of Guelph; University of Toronto; University of Waterloo; University of California Irvine; Northwestern University

Hind Al-Abadleh (1977 or 1978 – 9 January 2025) was a professor of chemistry at Wilfrid Laurier University in Waterloo, Ontario, Canada. She studied the physical chemistry of environmental interfaces, aerosols, and climate change.

== Early life and education ==
Al-Abadleh grew up in the United Arab Emirates, where she became interested in chemistry during high school. She was excited that science could be used to protect the environment. In high school, she developed an interest in chemical impacts on the environment and went on to graduate as one of the top 10 students in the country. She eventually studied chemistry at the United Arab Emirates University, graduating in 1999. She joined the University of Iowa in 1999 for her doctoral studies, earning her PhD in 2003. She was awarded the University of Iowa Dissertation Prize in Mathematics, Physical Sciences, and Engineering.

== Research ==
She moved to Northwestern University for a postdoctoral scholarship working with Franz Geiger. Whilst she loved Iowa, 9/11 made America a hostile climate for Muslim women (and men). She was appointed to the Department of Chemistry at Wilfrid Laurier University as an assistant professor in 2005 and was eventually promoted to Full Professor. She was awarded a Research Corporation Cottrell College Science Award to study the surface interactions of organoarsenical compounds with geosorbents spectroscopically. Al-Abadleh held an adjunct professor appointment at the University of Waterloo. She also was a visiting professor at the University of Toronto and Trent University (as the Inaugural Ray March Visiting Professor). The 2008 Petro-Canada award allowed her to study organic arsenic in soil and water. Her research has been supported by the American Chemical Society, Ontario's Ministry of Research and Innovation, Imperial Oil and the Canadian Foundation for Climate and Atmospheric Sciences. She is studying the aging of aerosols using computational chemistry, mathematical modelling and spectroscopy. She gave a talk at 2014 TEDx Laurier University, To Dream and To Act. In 2015 she published a study showing that aqueous phase reactions of guaiacol and catechol with iron lead to the formation of secondary colored particles. This study highlighted additional pathways for particle growth in the atmosphere in addition to particle nucleation and growth from gas-phase precursors.

In 2018 she was named the Fulbright Canada Research Chair in Climate Change and worked at the University of California, Irvine, for 2019. This position allowed her to teach a course on environmental catalysis and conduct research on multiphase chemistry in atmospheric aerosols catalyzed by metals. She was also a board member of Nano Ontario.

At Laurier, Dr. Al-Abadleh was honored with the 2023 Hoffman-Little Award for teaching, leadership, and collaboration; the 2021 University Research Professor Award, a Faculty Mentoring Award in 2015 and multiple Wilfrid Laurier University Faculty Association Merit Awards. She was a fellow of the UK’s Royal Society of Chemistry, a long-time member of the American Chemical Society and the Chemical Institute of Canada.

In August 2024, Dr. Al-Abadleh began serving as department chair for Earth, Environmental and Resource Sciences at the University of Texas. She died in January, 2025.

== Bibliography ==
1. FT-IR Study of Water Adsorption on Aluminum Oxide Surfaces
2. Surface Water Structure and Hygroscopic Properties of Light Absorbing Secondary Organic Polymers of Atmospheric Relevance
3. Efficient Formation of Light-Absorbing Polymeric Nanoparticles from the Reaction of Soluble Fe(III) with C4 and C6 Dicarboxylic Acids
4. ATR-FTIR and Flow Microcalorimetry Studies on the Initial Binding Kinetics of Arsenicals at the Organic–Hematite Interface \
5. Density functional theory calculations on the adsorption of monomethylarsonic acid onto hydrated iron (oxyhydr)oxide clusters
6. Dispersion Effects on the Thermodynamics and Transition States of Dimethylarsinic Acid Adsorption on Hydrated Iron (Oxyhydr)oxide Clusters from Density Functional Theory Calculations

=== Awards ===
- 2018 Wilfrid Laurier University Faculty Association Merit Award
- 2018 Environmental Science Leader of the Society of Environmental Toxicology and Chemistry
- 2017 Kitchener-Waterloo Coalition of Muslim Women Women Who Inspire Award
- 2016 Canadian Arab Institute in Toronto Canadian Arab to Watch
- 2016 Muslim Awards for Excellence (MAX) Platinum Award of Excellence
- 2016 Wilfrid Laurier University Faculty Association Merit Award
- 2012 Wilfrid Laurier University Faculty Association Merit Award
- 2008 Petro-Canada Young Innovator Award
