= Thomas Hinde (disambiguation) =

Thomas Hinde (1737–1828) was an American surgeon.

Thomas Hinde may also refer to:

- Thomas Hinde (senior) (1720–1798), English slave trader based in Lancaster
- Thomas Hinde (novelist) (1926–2014), English novelist
- Thomas S. Hinde (1785–1846), American newspaper editor, historian, real estate investor, and Methodist minister
