= Benjamin Hind =

English cricketer

Personal information
- Full name: Benjamin James Hind
- Born: 22 December 1882; Nottingham, Nottinghamshire, England
- Died: 1 April 1974 (aged 91); Nottingham, Nottinghamshire, England
- Batting: Right-handed
- Bowling: Leg break

Domestic team information
- Years: Team
- 1911: Nottinghamshire

Career statistics
Competition	First-class
Matches	1
Runs scored	28
Batting average	14.00
100s/50s	–/–
Top score	23
Balls bowled	66
Wickets	–
Bowling average	–
5 wickets in innings	–
10 wickets in match	–
Best bowling	–
Catches/stumpings	–/–
- Source: Cricinfo, 22 February 2013

Benjamin James Hind (22 December 1882 – 1 April 1974) was an English cricketer. Hind was a right-handed batsman who bowled leg break. He was born at Nottingham, Nottinghamshire.

Hind made a single first-class appearance for Nottinghamshire against Yorkshire at Trent Bridge in the 1911 County Championship. Nottinghamshire won the toss and elected to bat first, making 141 all out, with Hind dismissed for 5 runs by George Hirst. In Yorkshire's first-innings of 266 all out, Hind bowled eleven wicketless overs which conceded 42 runs. In Nottinghamshire's second-innings of 98 all out, he was dismissed for 23 by Hirst, with Yorkshire winning what was to be his only first-class appearance by an innings and 27 runs.

He died at the city of his birth on 1 April 1974.
