= Barnabas Oley =

English churchman and academic

Barnabas Oley (1602–1686) was an English churchman and academic. A royalist figure of the First English Civil War, he was also the first editor of George Herbert and Thomas Jackson, and a personal friend of Nicholas Ferrar. In old age he was archdeacon of Ely for a year.

== Life ==
He was baptised in the parish church of Wakefield on 26 December 1602, as son of Francis Oley, a clerk, who married Mary Mattersouse on 25 June 1600. He was educated at Queen Elizabeth Grammar School, Wakefield, which he entered in 1607. In 1617 he proceeded to Clare College, Cambridge, probably as Cave's exhibitioner from his school, and graduated B.A. 1621, M.A. 1625, and B.D. A crown mandate for the degree of D.D. to him and two other eminent divines was dated 14 April, and published 17 June 1663, but the honour was declined. He was elected probationer-fellow of the foundation of Lady Clare at his college on 28 November 1623, and a senior fellow in 1627, and filled the offices of tutor and president, one of his pupils being Peter Gunning. Oley was also taxor for the university in 1634, and proctor in 1635.

In 1633 Oley was appointed by his college to the vicarage of Great Gransden, Huntingdonshire, and held it until his death; but for several years he continued to reside at Cambridge. The first steps for the rebuilding of the college, which was begun on 19 May 1638 but not finished until 1715, were taken under his direction; he was called by Thomas Fuller its "Master of the Fabric". When the university sent its plate to the king at Nottingham to be converted into money for his use, it was entrusted to his care and safely brought to the king's headquarters, August 1642, a mission with John Barwick. For not residing at Cambridge, and for not appearing before the commission when summoned to attend, he was ejected by Edward Montagu, 2nd Earl of Manchester from his fellowship on 8 April 1644. He was also plundered of his personal and landed property, and forced to leave his benefice.

For seven years Oley wandered through England in poverty. In 1643 and 1646 he was at Oxford. Early in 1645, when Pontefract Castle was being defended for the king, he was within its walls, and preached to the garrison; and when Sir Marmaduke Langdale was condemned to death in 1648, but escaped from prison, and hid for some weeks in a haystack, he made his way to London in clerical dress supplied by Oley. For some time he lived at Heath, near Wakefield, and in 1652-3 he stayed in the north, near Lady Saville's demolished house.

In 1659 Oley returned to Gransden, and on 9 July 1660 he was restored to his fellowship by an order of the same Earl of Manchester. Through Gilbert Sheldon he was presented on 3 August 1660 to the third prebendal stall of Worcester Cathedral, and on 8 November 1679 he was collated, on the nomination of Gunning, his old pupil, to the archdeaconry of Ely. This preferment he resigned in the following year but he retained the stall at Worcester until his death. Oley died at Gransden on 20 February 1686, and was buried there on the night of 22 February, an inscription to his memory being placed on the wall at the west end of the interior of the church.

== Works ==
Oley edited in 1652 Herbert's Remains, or sundry pieces of that Sweet Singer, Mr. George Herbert, containing A Priest to the Temple, or the countrey parson, Jacula Prudentum, &c. Prefixed was an unsigned preface by Oley. The second edition appeared in 1671 as A Priest to the Temple or the Country Parson, with a new preface, signed Barnabas Oley. These pieces were reprinted in later editions of Herbert's Works. The manuscript of The Country Parson was the property of Herbert's friend, Arthur Wodenoth, who gave it to Oley; the prefaces were a source for Izaak Walton's memoir of Herbert.

Three volumes of the works of Thomas Jackson appeared under the care of Oley in 1653-57. The three volumes were reissued in 1673, with a general dedication to Sheldon, then Archbishop of Canterbury, and with a preface to the reader enlarged and edited from the three that existed (reprinted in Jackson's Works, ed. 1844). The Jackson manuscripts were left by Oley to Thomas Lamplugh. Oley was one of those appointed by Gunning to sort Nicholas Ferrar's papers.

== Legacy ==
Oley built and endowed the brick school-house of 1664 in Great Gransden, now the Barnabas Oley School.

Oley made other charitable bequests. In 1685, he granted money to 10 poor parishes in the diocese of Carlisle, Cumbria, in order that they should buy a set of 16 divinity books, a set to be placed in each vicarage. This was the first time that libraries had been provided for the poorest parishes, and was work that was taken up in the 1690s by Dr. Thomas Bray both in England and Wales, and in British North America.
