= Bernard Hale (priest) =

English clergyman and academic

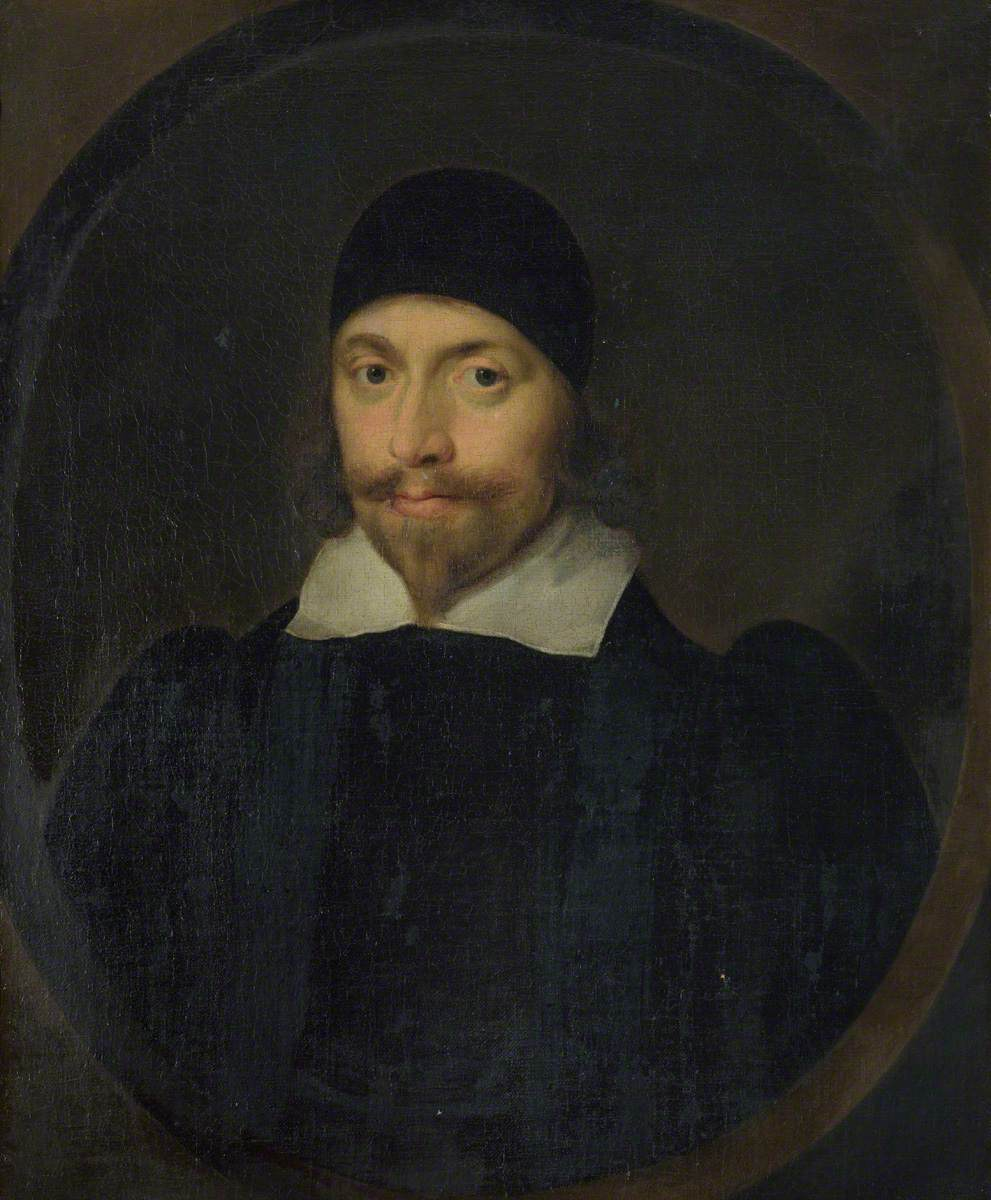
Bernard Hale

Bernard Hale (died 29 March 1663) was a 17th-century English clergyman and academic, who served as Archdeacon of Ely and Master of Peterhouse, Cambridge.

Hale was the sixth son of William Hale of King's Walden, Hertfordshire. The Hale family had made a fortune in London in the grocery business in the sixteenth century and then settled in Saffron Walden, where they were still living in Victorian times.

He was educated at Richard Hale's School in Hertford (founded by his grandfather Richard Hale in 1617), at Westminster School, and at Peterhouse, Cambridge. He entered Peterhouse in 1625, graduating B.A. 1629, M.A. 1632, B.D. (per lit. reg.) 1639, D.D. (per lit. reg.) 1660.

He was a Fellow of Peterhouse 1632–34, resigning the fellowship on the death of his father, which left him with a plentiful inheritance. He lived in London and then Norfolk, using his resources to provide for the local poor and for exhibitions for university students.

At the Restoration in 1660, Hale became Archdeacon of Ely, a prebendary of Ely Cathedral, Rector of Fen Ditton and Master of Peterhouse.

In 1663 Hale was "seized with a paralytic stupor" for three days, dying on 29 March 1663. He was buried the following day, in the chapel of Peterhouse.

He was a considerable benefactor to Peterhouse both in his lifetime and in his will, bequeathing land valued at more than £7,000, endowing the organ scholarship, and providing for seven other scholarships.

Academic offices
Preceded by John Cosin	Master of Peterhouse, Cambridge; 1660–1663	Succeeded by Joseph Beaumont
