= Billy Hind =

English footballer

Personal information
- Full name: William Hind
- Date of birth: April 1885
- Place of birth: Percy Main, England
- Date of death: 30 January 1963 (aged 77)
- Place of death: East Ham, England
- Height: 5 ft 10 in (1.78 m)
- Positions: Right half; right back

Senior career*
| Years | Team | Apps | (Gls) |
| –1907 | Willington Athletic | | |
| 1907–1908 | Fulham | 3 | (0) |
| 1908–1919 | Clapton Orient | 198 | (7) |
- * Club domestic league appearances and goals

William Hind (April 1885 – 30 January 1963) was an English professional footballer who made over 190 appearances as a right half in the Football League for Clapton Orient. He also played league football for Fulham. After his retirement as a player, Hind served Ton Pentre as trainer and returned to Clapton Orient as assistant trainer.

== Personal life ==
Prior to becoming a professional footballer, Hind worked as a plasterer. He served as a gunner in the British Army during the First World War.

== Career statistics ==
Appearances and goals by club, season and competition
| Club | Season | League | | | FA Cup | | Total | |
| Club | Season | Division | Apps | Goals | Apps | Goals | Apps | Goals |
|---|---|---|---|---|---|---|---|---|
| Fulham | 1907–08 | Second Division | 3 | 0 | 0 | 0 | 3 | 0 |
| Clapton Orient | 1914–15 | Second Division | 15 | 0 | 0 | 0 | 15 | 0 |
| Career total | | | 18 | 0 | 0 | 0 | 18 | 0 |

== Honours ==
Clapton Orient

- London Challenge Cup: 1911–12
