= John Hind (mathematician) =

English mathematician

John Hind (1796–1866), was an English mathematician.

== Life ==
Hind was born in Cumberland in 1796, entered St. John's College, Cambridge, as a sizar, on 2 February 1813, but was elected to a scholarship in 1815. He graduated B.A. in 1818 as second wrangler and second Smith's prizeman, and the next year was chosen Taylor mathematical lecturer and fellow-commoner (B.A.) of Sidney Sussex College. In 1821 he proceeded M.A., and took orders; was elected fellow in 1823, but resigned his lectureship in that year, and his fellowship in the year following. For some time he acted as tutor. He acted as moderator in 1822, 1823, and 1826, and as examiner in 1824 and 1827. He died at Cambridge on 17 Dec. 1866, aged 70 He was married and had a family.

Hind was a fellow of the Cambridge Philosophical Society and of the Royal Astronomical Society.

== Works ==
- The Principles of the Differential and Integral Calculus, vol. i., 8vo, Cambridge, 1827.
- The Elements of Plane and Spherical Trigonometry, &c., 2nd edit., 8vo, Cambridge, 1828; 5th ed. 1855.
- The Elements of Algebra, &c., 8vo, Cambridge, 1829; 6th ed, revised, 1855.
- The Principles of the Differential Calculus, with its application to Curves and Curve Surfaces..., Second Ed., 8vo, Cambridge. 1831.
- A Digested Series of Examples in the applications of the Principles of the Differential Calculus, 8vo, Cambridge, 1832.
- The Principles and Practice of Arithmetic,8vo, Cambridge, 1832; 8th ed., with a new appendix of miscellaneous questions, 1856.
- The Principles and Practice of Arithmetical Algebra, &c., 3rd ed., 8vo, Cambridge, 1855.
- The Solutions of the Questions in the Principles and Practice of Arithmetic, 2nd ed., 12mo, Cambridge, 1856.
