= William G. R. Hind =

Canadian artist (1833-1889)

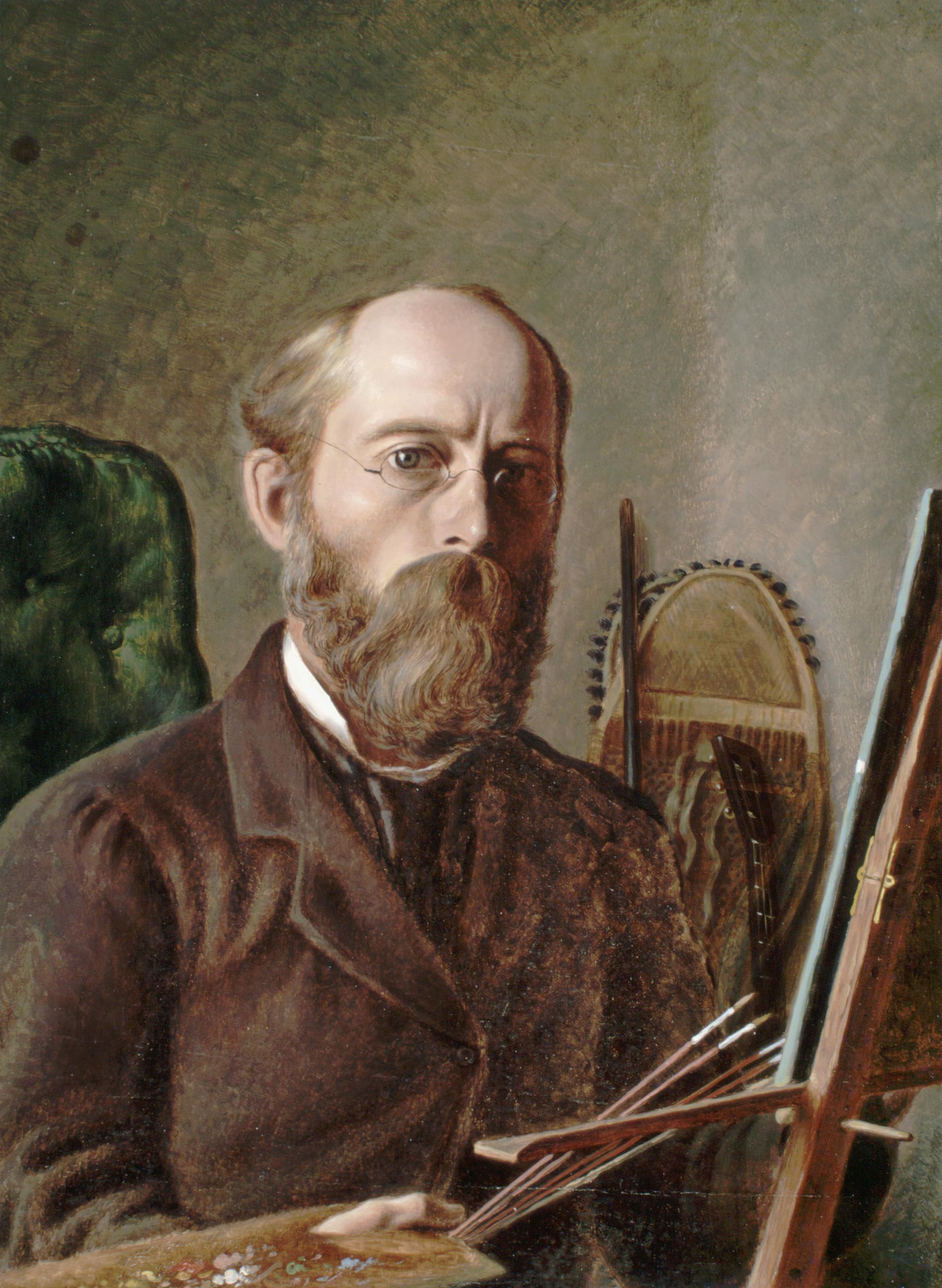
- William Hind, self-portrait (1865), Library and Archives Canada
- Born: William George Richardson Hind; June 12, 1833; Nottingham, England
- Died: November 18, 1889 (aged 56); Sussex, New Brunswick
- Known for: artist

William G. R. Hind (June 12, 1833 – November 18, 1889) was a painter in watercolours and illustrator known for his depictions of the Canadian west.

== Biography ==
Hind was born in Nottingham, England; he emigrated to Canada in 1851, following his older brother Henry Youle Hind, who came to Toronto in 1846. Since his brother taught at the Toronto Normal School, it is likely he wished to follow in his brother's footsteps: he taught drawing at the school (1851–1857). He also established his own studio and exhibited paintings at the Upper Canada Provincial Exhibition of 1852.

In the late 1850s, he returned to England, where he may have seen the work of the Pre-Raphaelite Brotherhood and it seems to have influenced his work. In 1861, having returned to Canada, he joined his brother's expedition to the Moisie River, a tributary of the St. Lawrence. He produced more than 100 sketches on the journey, including his impressions of the landscape and the local First Nations people, the Naskapi and Montagnais. Some were used as woodcut illustrations in Henry's published report, Explorations in the interior of the Labrador peninsula (1863). After the expedition's return to Toronto, William used others as a basis for painting an important series of large finished water colours; 16 of these were made into coloured lithographs for inclusion in the same report.

In 1862, Hind set off with the Overlanders, a group of people travelling from Fort Garry in Winnipeg, Manitoba to British Columbia in search of gold in the Cariboo gold fields. Hind kept a sketchbook on the journey in which he recorded the group hunting duck and buffalo, fording swollen streams, idling in camp and other subjects.

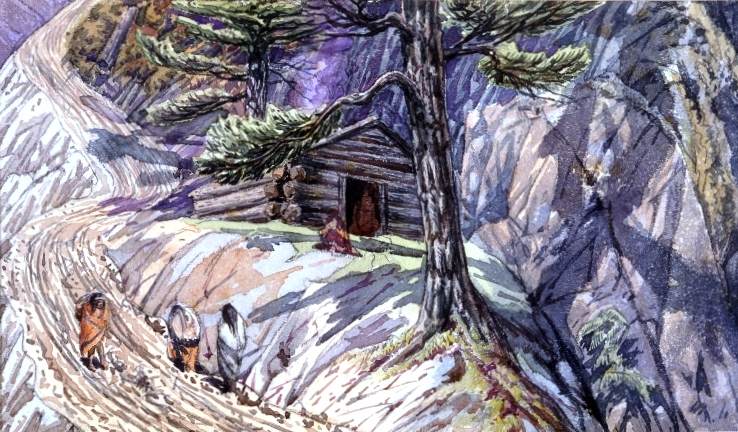
Lillooet 1862

From 1862 to 1869, Hind lived in Victoria, British Columbia, working as a sign painter. He may have visited the Cariboo in 1864 and painted oil and watercolour sketches. before travelling east, to Winnipeg in 1869. In 1870, following his brother again who had moved by this time to Nova Scotia, he went there. He found work with the Intercolonial Railway, in Nova Scotia and New Brunswick.

Hind had one of his paintings exhibited in the Colonial and Indian Exhibition in London in 1886. His last six years were spent in Sussex, New Brunswick, where he died in 1889.

His work is in the public collections of the National Gallery of Canada; the McCord Museum; Library and Archives Canada; and Dalhousie University, Halifax.
