= John Hind (bishop in Fukien) =

Anglo-Irish missionary bishop

The Right Reverend John Hind
- Bishop of Fukien
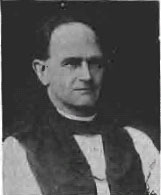
- Hind in the 1920s
- Church: Church of Ireland

Orders
- Ordination: 24 June 1902

Personal details
- Born: 17 February 1879
- Died: 7 July 1958 (aged 79)
- Education: Trinity College

John Hind
- Traditional Chinese: 恒約翰
- Simplified Chinese: 恒约翰
Transcriptions
Standard Mandarin
- Hanyu Pinyin: Héng Yuēhàn
Eastern Min
- Fuzhou BUC: Hèng Iók-hâng

John Hind (17 February 1879 – 7 July 1958) was an Anglo-Irish missionary bishop of the Anglican Church in Fukien.

== Life ==
Hind was born in Belfast, Ireland, in 1879. His grandfather William Marsden Hind (1815–1894) was an archaeologist and botanist. Hind graduated (B.A.) at Trinity College, Dublin in 1900. He then entered the Church of Ireland Divinity School, obtaining his Divinity Testimonium in 1902, and was ordained Deacon by the Bishop of Killaloe specifically for missionary work in China with the Dublin University Fukien Mission. Arriving in China, he was posted to Funing. The following year, he was ordained Priest by the Bishop of Victoria, Hong Kong (Bishop Joseph Hoare). Hind travelled around his pastoral area, visiting the tiny congregations on foot or along the coast in the T.C.D. (a boat presented to the Mission by supporters in Trinity College Dublin). He supervised the building of a new church, a boys' school, a women's hospital, new houses, and a chapel for the girls' school in addition to all his pastoral work.

In 1904, Hind married Alice Carpenter and they had a daughter and a son. But both his wife and his daughter died of dysentery, and in 1909 he took his young son back to Ireland, where for a brief two years (1909–10) he served a curacy at St Mary's, Belfast. He returned to Fukien in late 1910 to be in charge of primary and secondary schools in Fuzhou. In 1911 he was appointed Head Master of the C.M.S. Middle School, Fuzhou, and remained in this post until 1918, when he was elected Bishop of Fukien Diocese in succession to its first bishop (Bishop H.McC.E. Price). Hind returned to England for his consecration as Lord Bishop of Fukien by the Archbishop of Canterbury in Lambeth Palace Chapel on St Luke's Day, 18 October 1918. At the same time, the University of Dublin granted him an honorary Doctorate of Divinity. Shortly afterwards, he married his second wife, Winifred Heyworth, who had trained as a doctor and had come out to China as a missionary in 1920.

Hind held the conviction that the mission to China must become the Church in China. To this end, he reversed the accepted seniority of missionaries: in future they were to be assistants to Chinese incumbents, and would cease to be the chairmen of the existing network of church councils; minutes of the Synods would be in Chinese, and the business would be conducted in Chinese; Synod (and not missionaries' conference) would decide where missionaries were to work. His aim was to bring the church to the point of depending as little as possible on outside help. After the outbreak of the Second World War, he resigned his bishopric (in 1940) and returned to Ireland. For four more years, he worked in Belfast as C.M.S. Secretary for Northern Ireland, retiring from active ministry in 1944.

Hind's book, Fukien Memories, was published in Belfast in 1951. He died in 1958.

== See also ==
- Christ Church, Cangxia – former cathedral of the Anglican Diocese of Fukien, whose foundation stone was laid by John Hind

Church of England titles
Preceded by Horace Price	Bishop in Fukien; 1918–1940	Succeeded by Christopher Sargent
