= James Hind =

English highwayman (c. 1616–1652)

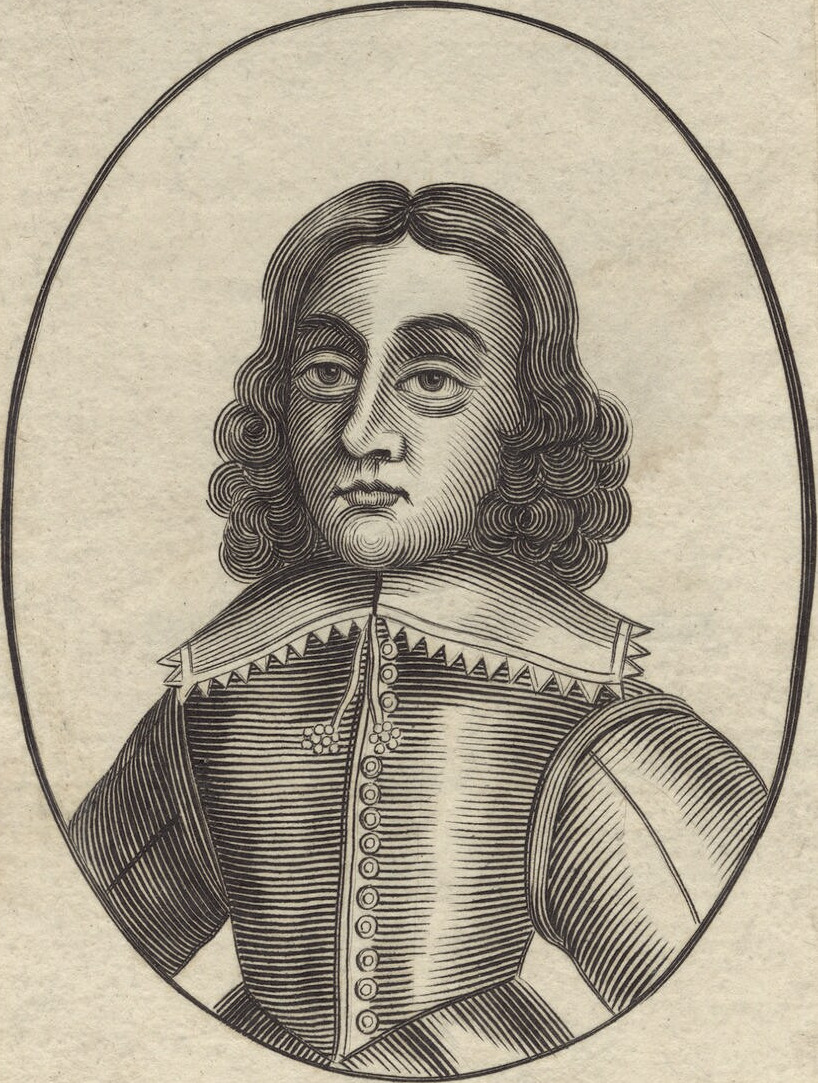
- Born: c. 1616; Chipping Norton, Oxfordshire, England
- Died: 1652; Worcester, Worcestershire, England
- Cause of death: Hanged, drawn and quartered
- Other name: John Hind
- Occupation: Highwayman
- Parent(s): Roger Kynaston and Elizabeth Grey
- Conviction: Murder
- Criminal charges: Treason, rather than highway robbery
- Penalty: Hanged, drawn and quartered

James Hind (sometimes referred to as John Hind; baptised 1616, died 1652) was a 17th-century highwayman and Royalist rabble-rouser during the English Civil War. He came from the town of Chipping Norton, Oxfordshire. He fought in the English Civil War for the Royalist cause. Some reports tell of him assisting the escape of King Charles II after his defeat at the Battle of Worcester. After the war, he took up highway robbery against the Commonwealth forces with his exploits both real and embellished printed in numerous pamphlets that made him into a Royalist folk hero of the Robin Hood mould. His partner Thomas Allen was captured when they attempted but failed to rob Oliver Cromwell. Hind also robbed John Bradshaw, President of the High Court of Justice for the trial of King Charles I. He refused to rob Cavaliers and even gave money to poor Royalists.

He was finally caught during the Protectorate when one of his associates revealed him to the authorities. However, Hind was charged with treason rather than highway robbery because of his expressed Royalist loyalty and was hanged, drawn and quartered in 1652 at Worcester. He was the subject of a biography The English Gusman by George Fidge (London 1652), and 16 pamphlets detailing his exploits.
