= Guy's, King's and St Thomas' RFC =

English rugby union club, based in Honor Oak Park, London

(England) Guy's, King's and St. Thomas'
- Full name: Guy's, King's and St. Thomas' Rugby Football Club
- Union: RFU
- Nickname: GKT
- Founded: 1843; 183 years ago
- Location: Honor Oak Park, London, England
- Ground: Guy's Hospital Athletic Ground
- President: Ben Challacombe
- Director of Rugby: Ian Arnott
- Captain: Toby R Donelan (1st XV) Max Wight (2nd XV) Caleb Adamu (Saturday Captain)
- League(s): Shepherd Neame Kent 5 BUCS 2B
Team kit

Official website
- guyshospitalrfc

Guy's, King's and St. Thomas' Rugby Football Club ("GKT") is the name given to the modern amalgam of three formerly distinct hospital rugby clubs each with a long history, having all been founded in the nineteenth century. The teams from Guy's Hospital and St Thomas' Hospital were the first to merge following the union of their respective Medical Departments. When King's College Hospital also merged in 1999 the King's College Hospital Rugby Football Club opted to remain separate and in so doing became an open rugby club that no longer represented the Hospital Medics. GKT is notable for having been part of the twenty-one founding members of the Rugby Football Union (the Guy's team), and across its joint history has produced many international players. The current fixtures secretary is Suyog Naharki (dubbed "shăh").

== History ==
The history of GKT is the combined history of three older sides, and their joint history from the point of merger:

=== Guy's Hospital Football Club ===
The Guy's Hospital Football Club, representing the medics of Guy's Hospital, in Southwark, London, is accepted by the Rugby Football Union and the Guinness Book of Records as being the oldest rugby club in the world and therefore the first football club, with a foundation date of 1843. Despite the acceptance by these two bodies of Guy's foundation date, the claim to be the oldest club is contested. The major reason for doubt is that no contemporary documentation survives. The date of 1843 is based on circumstantial evidence predominantly in the form of a fixture card from 1883/4 referring to Guy's 40th season and the submission of distinguished officials in 1863 and 1864. There are clubs with a longer documented history because they have contemporary documentary evidence, the oldest being Dublin University Football Club, which also plays rugby, formed at Trinity College, Dublin, Ireland, in 1854, with the oldest in England being Blackheath FC founded in 1858. The club Barnes R.F.C. (originally known simply as the Barnes Club), claims to have been founded in 1839, but this has no contemporary documentation and its circumstantial evidence is neither as abundant nor as compelling as that of Guy's Hospital.

The club played football using a modified form of the Rugby School code. They originally played on Blackheath and after the formation of Blackheath FC in 1858, (the club of the old boys of Blackheath Proprietary School), Guy's shared a dressing room with them in the Princess of Wales hotel from 1862. On 26 January 1871, they sent representation to a meeting of twenty-one London and suburban football clubs that followed Rugby School rules assembled at the Pall Mall Restaurant in Regent Street. E.C. Holmes, captain of the Richmond Club assumed the presidency. It was resolved unanimously that the formation of a Rugby Football Society was desirable and thus the Rugby Football Union was formed. A president, a secretary and treasurer, and a committee of thirteen were elected, to whom was entrusted the drawing-up of the laws of the game upon the basis of the code in use at Rugby School. Guy's Hospital was represented on the founding committee by J. H. Ewart, one of thirteen places on that original committee.

In the nineteenth century Guy's did produce some international players, including Alan Ayre-Smith, W. W. Pinching, A. W. Pearson, and A. H. Jackson, and they did have some success in the Inter-Hospital Challenge Cup. However, it was in the 1920s and '30s that Guy's reached its zenith and was arguably the most formidable team in the land especially when under the captaincy of the Ireland international and Irish national captain W.D. Doherty. In total Guy's has won the United Hospitals Challenge Cup 32 times, a record that stood for many years until St. Mary's/Imperial Medics overtook it.

=== St Thomas' Hospital Football Club ===
St Thomas' Hospital Football Club was officially established in 1864. They first played on Clapham Common, using the Clock Tavern as their changing room. They later moved to the Lambeth Palace Grounds and in 1897 moved to Chiswick, where they stayed for over half a century until in the 1950s they moved to Cobham. The club's success in the United Hospitals Cup came early on in 1878 and they went on to win it a further 15 times. Between 1892 and 1897 they were undefeated in the competition. In 1892 the team was regarded by contemporaries as "the only hospital which has so far mastered a scientific game, or which has been able to hold its own in first-class company."

Eleven international players have won their caps whilst playing for St Thomas' from J H Dewhurst in 1887 to M A Smith in 1970. A further 18 club members have played for the Barbarians.

In 1982 the Medical Schools of Guy's and St Thomas' Hospitals merged creating the United Medical and Dental Schools ("UMDS") and this in turn led to the eventual merger between Guy's and St Thomas' Hospital Rugby Clubs in the early 1990s. In 1999 King's College London merged with UMDS to create Guy's, King's and St. Thomas' Schools of Medicine, Dentistry and Biomedical Sciences, and this led to the creation of a GKT Rugby team.

=== King's College Hospital Football Club ===
In 1869, 90 members from King's College formed a football club representing faculties including the Medical Department. The club played football using a modified form of the Rugby School code. Like Guy's Hospital, King's sent representation to the 1871 meeting at the Pall Mall Restaurant in Regent Street that formed the Rugby Football Union. Although King's College was considered prominent enough to have been invited, they did not gain any of the thirteen places on the original committee. The team never had a period of glory comparable to Guy's St Thomas' although the 1920s and 1930s did see a period of success.

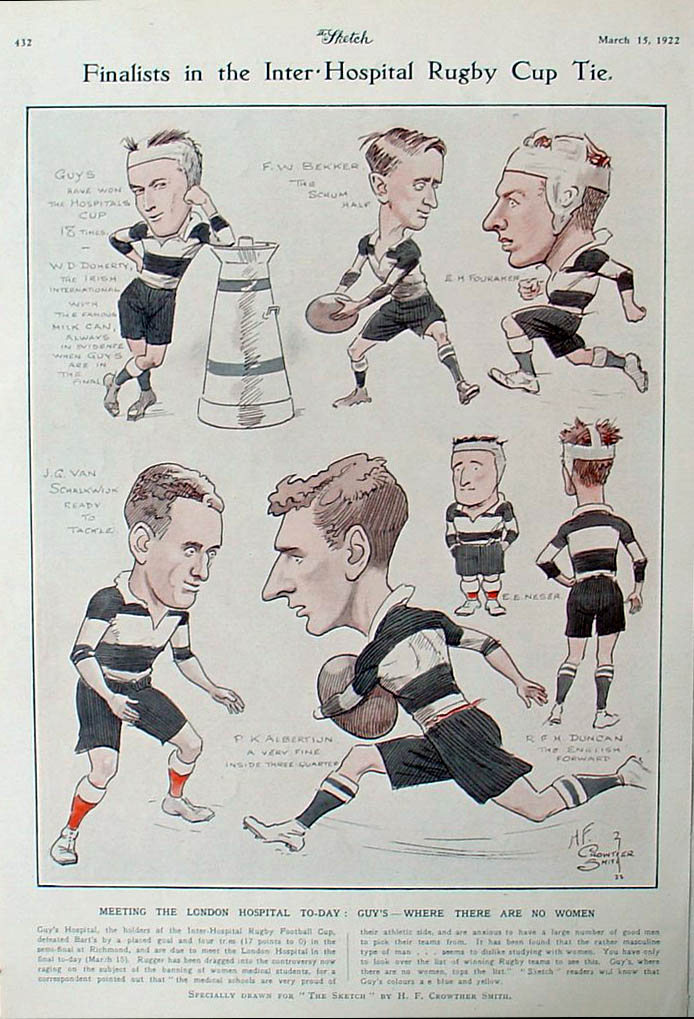
Caricature from The Sketch magazine in 1922

In 1924 they won 10 of 13 games and reached the final rounds of the Hospital Cup, a feat which was almost repeated the following season when King's fell in the semi-final to Guy's Hospital. King's found themselves in the finals of 1926 and 1929 where Guy's were victorious, and in the final of 1935 they lost to St. Mary's. During the 1920s and 1930s a number of international players played for King's among them being the England and 1924 British Lions captain, Dr Ron Cove-Smith, as well as the 1927 British Lions captain and Scotland International Dr D J Macmyn (who later became President of the Scottish Rugby Union). W R F Collis of Ireland was another international capped player.

The team entered the Inter-Hospital Challenge Cup from its inception in 1874 and played in every competition until the merger in 1999 of the King's College medical school with the already merged Guy's and St. Thomas' Medical Departments. When they merged it was decided that the hospital medics would be represented by one rugby club, GKT. King's College Hospital Rugby Football Club opted to remain a separate entity in so doing became an open rugby club that no longer represented the Hospital medics. In so doing they maintained their status as one of the oldest clubs in the World. KCHRFC currently play in the Kent 1st Division, and their home ground is the Dulwich Sports Ground in Turney Road, Dulwich.

=== Merger (1999–present) ===
The present day club's first XV plays in the Kent 2nd Division, and its home ground is the Guy's Hospital Athletic Ground at Honor Oak Park, Honor Oak. This recently underwent redevelopment and the club had to lead a nomadic existence for the 2008–9 season. The GKT Rugby team won back the United Hospitals Cup from Imperial Medics, at the Richmond Athletic Ground, on Sunday 22 March 2009 for the first time in many years.G.K.T. scored four tries to nil and beat Imperial by 30 points to 12 in the final.

== United Hospitals Challenge Cup ==
Guy's won the inaugural competition in 1875, the cup competition being the oldest in rugby. Guy's, with 31 wins to its name was the most successful hospital, matched at a later date by the St Mary's team. As a merged entity, GKT has a total number of cup wins of 50, if the wins of its merged entities are added together with its 2 wins since its formation in 1999.

Some video footage has been retained from the Guy's victory against Bart's in 1920.

United Hospital Challenge Cup wins
Hospital Team	First competed	Last competed	Current status	Wins	Tot. wins
Guy's	1874	1998	Part of G. K. T.	31	31
St Thomas's	1874	1998	Part of G. K. T.	16	16
King's College Hospital	1874	1998	Open club so no longer eligible. Medics represented by G.K.T.	0	0
Guy's and St. Thomas' RFC	1990	1998	Part of G. K. T.	1	48
G. K. T.	1999	present	Active	2	50

== International players ==
Source for below:

=== Guy's Hospital Rugby Football Club ===
- England – William Wyatt Pinching (1872)
- England – Alexander William Pearson (1875–1878)
- England – A M Jackson (1875–1881)
- England – Lennard Stokes (1878–1880)
- England – A S Taylor (1883–1886)
- Scotland – H L Evans (1885)
- Wales – Martyn Jordan (1885–1889)
- Ireland – Frank Stoker (1886–1891)
- England – William Grant Mitchell (1890–1893)
- England – Alfred Allport (1892–1894)
- England – M W Dudgeon (1897–1899)
- Wales – Teddy Morgan (1902–1908)
- England – Arnold Alcock (1906)
- England – Harry Lee (1907)
- Wales – Jack Jones (1908–1921)
- England – Herbert Archer (1909)
- England – Guy Hind (1910–1911)
- Scotland – Stephen Steyn (1911–1912)
- England – Jannie Krige (1920)
- England – Harry Millett (1920)
- Ireland – George Doherty (1920–1921)
- Wales – H Graham-Davis (1921–1925)
- England – Robert Duncan (1922)
- South Africa – Pierre Albertyn (1924)
- Wales – W M Lewis (1926–1928)
- Wales – Guy Morgan (1927–1930)
- Scotland – Charles Dick (1934–1938)
- England – Ernie Nicholson (1935–1936)
- South Africa – L Babrow (1937)
- England – John Keeling (1948)
- England – John Matthews (1949–1952)
- England – Nic Labuschagne (1953–1955)
- England – Bill Treadwell (1966)
- England – John Novak (1970)
- Denmark – C Deschamps (2018–present)

==== Guy's British and Irish Lions ====
- Herbert Archer (1908 Aus/Nz)
- Alan Ayre-Smith (1899 Aus/Nz)
- Edward Harrison (1903 SA)
- Guy Hind (1903 SA)
- Tuan Jones (1908 Aus/Nz)
- Pat McEvedy (1904 and 1908 Aus/Nz)
- Arthur O'Brien (1904 Aus/Nz)
- Stuart Saunders (1904 Aus/Nz)
- David Trail (1904 Aus/Nz)
- Whalley Stranack (1910 Arg (RFU "Combined British" tour))
- Martin Tweed (1910 Arg (RFU "Combined British" tour))

=== St. Thomas's Hospital Rugby Football Club ===
- England – J H Dewhurst (1887–1890)
- Scotland – Frederick Goodhue (1890–1892)
- (United Kingdom) Edward Bromet (1891)
- England – Arthur Rotherham (1898–1899) (United Kingdom) (1891)
- England – Albert Elliott (1894)
- England – William Ashford (1897–1898)
- Scotland – Ronald Murray (1935)
- Ireland – Dave MacSweeney (1955)
- England – Nick Silk (1965)
- Scotland – Alasdair Boyle (1966–1968)
- Scotland – Mike Smith (1970)

=== King's College Hospital Rugby Football Club – pre-1999 ===
- England – W. J. Penny (1878)
- England – Ronald Cove-Smith (1921–29) also British Lion
- Scotland – David MacMyn (1925–28) also British Lion
- Ireland – Robert Collis (1924–1926)

== Club captains ==
- 1998–2000 Ben P Thorpe
- 2000–01 Pete R Davis
- 2001–03 Tim SJW Price
- 2003–04 David H Berry
- 2004–06 Rhys L Davies
- 2006–07 Peter M Gretton
- 2007–08 Mark C Halls
- 2008–09 Johnny R Elias
- 2009–10 Duncan J Steele
- 2010–11 Charlie T West
- 2011–12 Fergus JD Devonport
- 2012–13 Zack N Tarrant-Taylor
- 2013–14 George Child
- 2014–15 James Ralston
- 2015–16 Arjun Desai
- 2016–17 Tom Francis
- 2017–18 Ben OL Ridley
- 2018–19 Ben P Murphy
- 2019–20 Ross M Walker
- 2020–21 Jude M Deane
- 2021–22 Dylan S Chase
- 2022-23 James F J Dunbar
- 2023–24 Tom Downie
- 2024-25 Toby Davis
- 2025-26 Luca P Marsella
- 2026-27 Toby R Donelan

== Club honours ==
- Kent 1 champions: 2000–01
- Kent Salver winners: 2006
- Kent 2 champions: 2010–11
