= 1951–52 Rugby Union County Championship =

English rugby union competition

1951–52 County Championship
- Countries: England
- Champions: Middlesex (2nd title)
- Runners-up: Lancashire

The 1951–52 Rugby Union County Championship was the 52nd edition of England's premier rugby union club competition at the time.

Middlesex won the competition for the second time after defeating Lancashire in the final.

== Final ==
8 March 1952

Middlesex	9–6	Lancashire
Try: Barker; Pen: Grimsdell (2)		Try: Bazley; Drop: Griffiths

Twickenham
Referee: L E O Evans (Devon)

G H Sullivan	St Mary's Hospital
Ted Woodward	Wasps
Albert Agar	LLoyds Bank & Harlequins
Brian Boobbyer	Rosslyn Park
D A Barker	Harlequins
Nim Hall	Richmond
Patrick Sykes	Wasps
A G C Jones	Old Paulines & Army
Nick Labuschagne	Guy's Hospital
J F Herbert	Wasps
John Matthews (capt)	Harlequins
Peter Yarranton	Wasps & Royal Air Force
A A Grimsdell	Harlequins
Jim Ritchie	London Irish
Dyson Wilson	Metropolitan Police

Harry Scott	Manchester
K Jones	Manchester
J P Quinn	Sheffield TC & New Brighton
F G Griffiths	Sale
Reg Bazley	Waterloo
Martin Regan	Liverpool
Gordon Rimmer	Waterloo
D Chapman	Broughton Park
Eric Evans	Sale
G K Williams	Liverpool
H J Foster	Waterloo
G Twist	St Helens
Reg Higgins	Leeds University
E Cosslet	Broughton Park
D Morgan	Waterloo

== See also ==
- English rugby union system
- Rugby union in England
