= Leek Embroidery Society =

British arts and crafts society

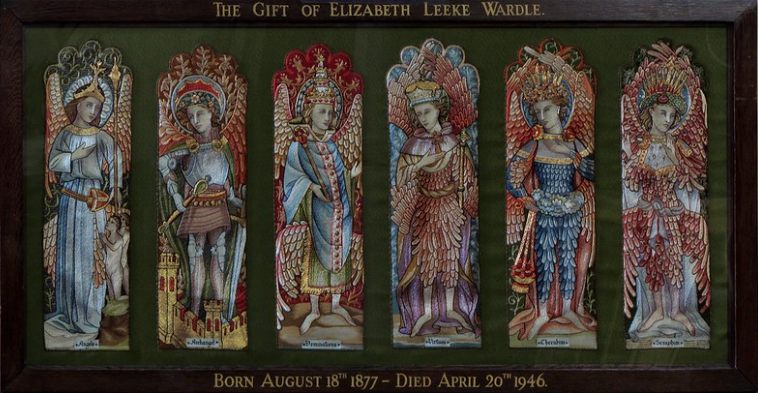
- Example embroidery - St Edward The Confessor Leek Angel Orders Embroideries
- Industry: Embroidery
- Founded: 1879
- Founder: Thomas and Elizabeth Wardle
- Area served: Leek, Staffordshire
- Products: Bayeux Tapestry Replica

Leek Embroidery Society (also known as The Leek Society, or The Society) was established in 1879 in Leek, Staffordshire. It was known for producing both domestic and ecclesiastical embroidery work, which was granted prestigious awards for its fineness and high quality. The Society also developed a form of embroidery using tussar silk and aimed to promote art embroidery and fine needlework which would be shown in many international exhibitions. The establishment of the Leek Embroidery Society also led to the founding of the Leek School of Art Embroidery.

== History ==
=== 1870s ===
During the 1870s, Art Needlework (or art embroidery) gained popularity in Britain and became a common method for embroiderers to use and teach. This method of embroidery was a reaction against the repetitive and unskilled needlework known as Berlin wool work, which had been immensely popular since the 1830s amongst leisured ladies. These societies aimed to improve the standard of embroidery, embroidery designs, and to provide suitable employment for poor gentlefolk or women who needed to earn a living.

=== 1880s ===
The Leek Embroidery Society was founded in 1879 by Thomas and Elizabeth Wardle and was originally called the Leek Sewing Circle. Thomas was a silk dyer who was later knighted for his services to the silk industry and Elizabeth was a skilled English embroider. Thomas gave Elizabeth strands of tussar silk and asked her to devise a new form of embroidery in the hopes that it would encourage needlewomen to use his silks. Thomas wished to expand his silk dyeing business by dyeing fibre which he had sourced in India. He promoted tussar silk to the Leek embroiders and imported tussar silk in woven form however, the Leek embroiders were only interested in the dyed yarns as this was more suitable for embroidery thread. Thomas’s wife Elizabeth developed a form of embroidery and art needlework using the tussar silk and so began the Leek Embroidery Society. Elizabeth was a supporter of the Art Needlework method and wanted the Society to promote art embroidery. Elizabeth has been called a leading practitioner of the art, inspired by the likes of William Morris. She knew Morris through her husband, Thomas Wardle, who worked with Morris developing natural vegetable dyes. The Leek Embroidery Society's work was representative of the Arts and Crafts movement, of which Morris was a leading figure.

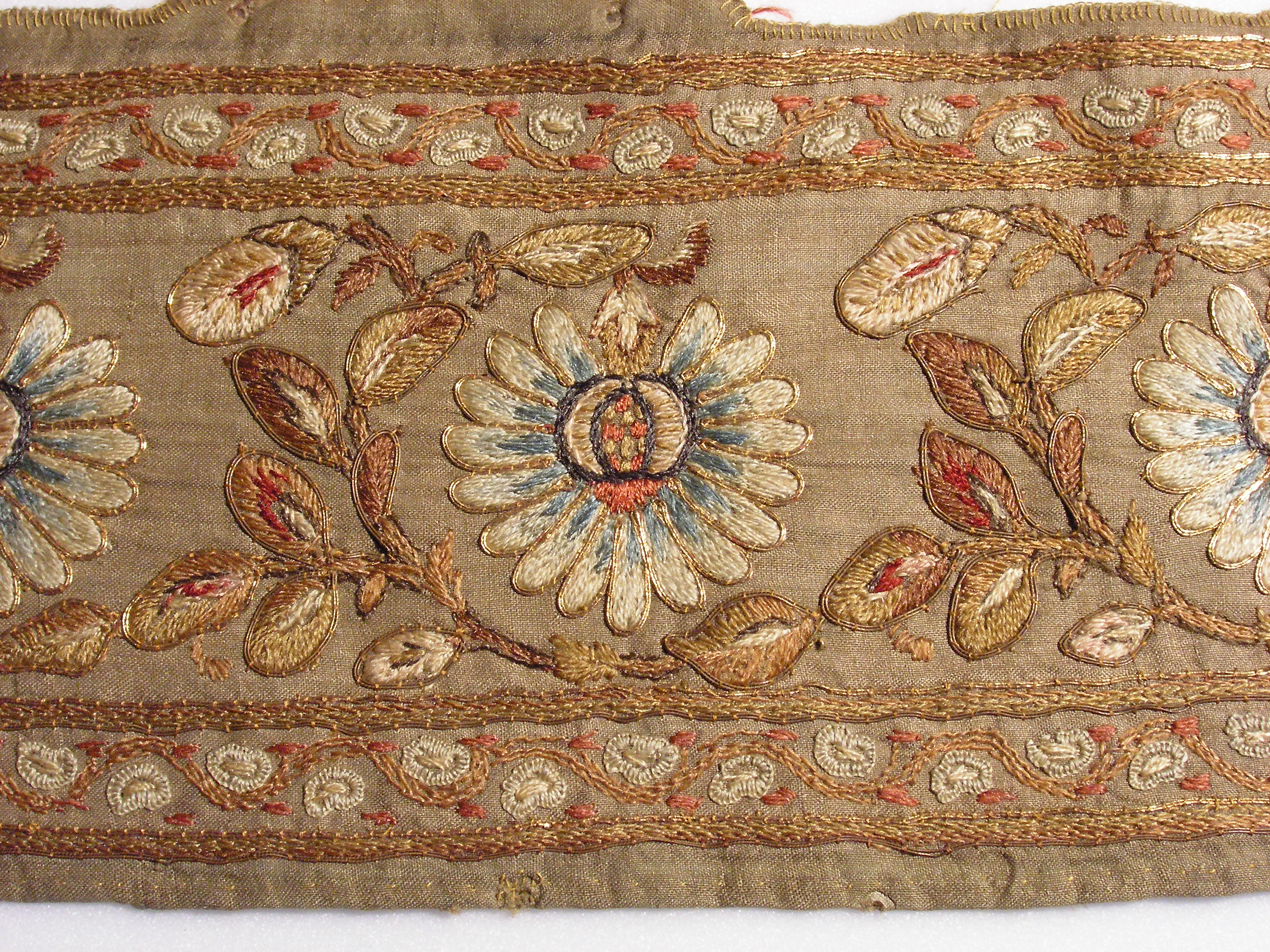
Edging, embroidered (AM 10879-1)

In 1881 the Society instigated an exhibition at the Leek Art School with the director of the South Kensington Museum presenting the prizes. The work exhibited consisted of their ecclesiastical work as well as fifteen items of secular embroidery. Morris & Company and the Royal School of Needlework also sent examples of work for the exhibition, this signified the acceptance of art needlework as a legitimate artistic medium.

The Leek embroiderers often used the tussar silk floss, often dyed using Thomas Wardle's natural dyes, on woven silk brocade for the church items, and on hand-blocked silk for items meant for the home. Some of these silks were from Thomas Wardle's silk mills. In addition to the tussar floss, they used gold thread from Japan. The Leek embroidery style was recognizable by the accomplished design and the vivid colors and richness of the silk. Members of the society also did some appliqué, worked on printed fabrics.

In 1883, a short-lived shop was opened in Bond Street in London by Thomas Wardle and W. S. Brough and then later through agencies. Items were sold in London at first however, there was also a shop in St. Edward Street, in Leek, next to the Wardle’s' home. Amongst the items sold were home furnishings such as cushions, drapes, and antimacassars.

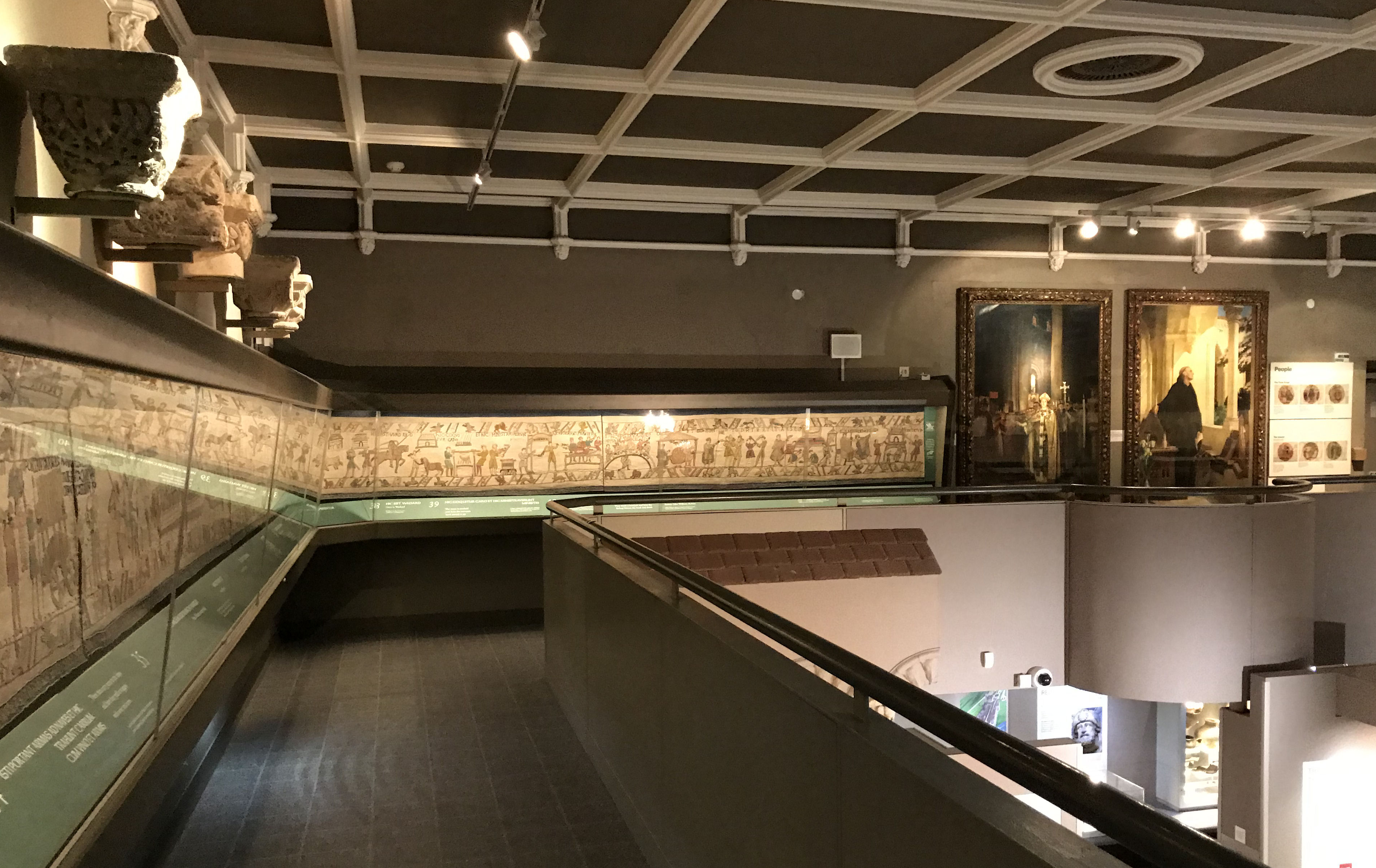
Bayeux Tapestry created by the Leek Embroidery Society on display at Reading Museum, 2019

By 1885, thirty-seven ladies of the Leek School of Art Embroidery Society began work on a replica of the Bayeux Tapestry. Elizabeth had seen the real Bayeux Tapestry while at an exhibition and believed that Britain should have its own version. Work took a year and the replica was exhibited across Britain, and in the USA and Germany, before finding its final home at Reading Museum in 1895. The replica of the Bayeux Tapestry is the most notable work made by the Leek Embroidery Society.

=== 1890s onwards ===
The Society’s work was in demand until around 1900 and was sold in Wardle’s shop in New Bond Street, William Morris’s shop in Oxford Street, Liberty & Co in Regent Street and at Debenham & Freebody, off Oxford Street. Elizabeth Wardle died in 1902, and the society’s output rapidly declined. Products which made use of the society’s designs continued to be sold in the Leek shop until it was closed in the 1930s.
