= John Ward (geologist) =

English draper, geologist, fossil collector and palaeontologist (1837–1906)

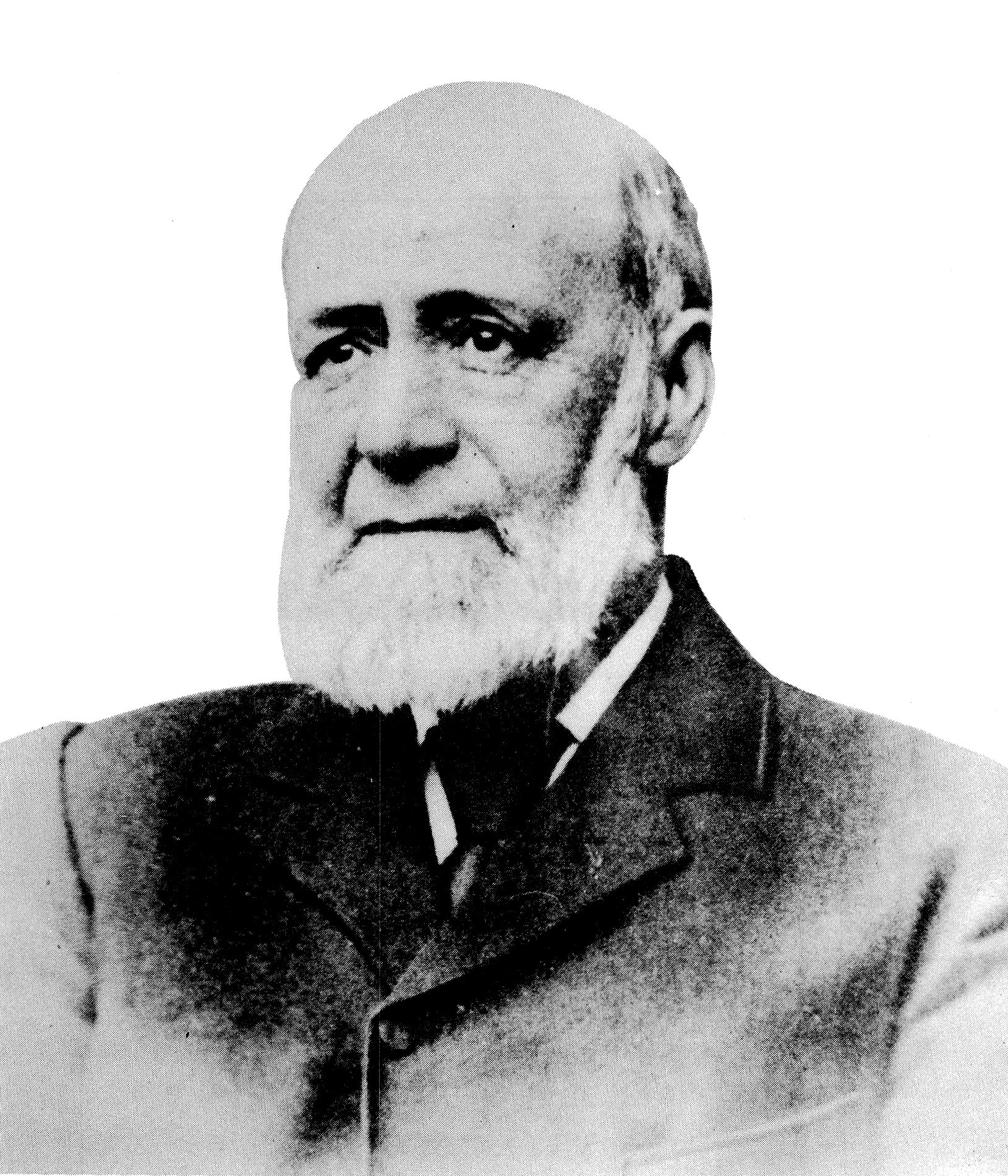
- Born: 11 August 1837; Fenton
- Died: 30 November 1906 (aged 69); Longton
- Resting place: Longton Cemetery
- Occupation: Draper, fossil collector, geologist, paleontologist, councillor, alderman, magistrate, poor-law guardian
- Awards: Garner Medal (for research into, and papers on the Geology and Paleontology of the North Staffordshire Coalfields, 1895); Fellow of the Geological Society of London (1874)

John Ward FGS (1837–1906) was an English draper, and an amateur palaeontologist and ichthyologist, known for collecting and researching fossils—especially fishes—from the coal mines of Staffordshire.

Many of the fossils he collected—including some type specimens—are in significant scientific collections. A number of species and a genus were named in his honour, although some of the species names are no longer considered valid.

He was a founder member and president of the North Staffordshire Naturalists Field Club and played an active role in the civic life of his home town of Longton, Staffordshire.

== Early years and career ==
John Ward, son of William Ward, was born on 11 August 1837, in Fenton, North Staffordshire, and educated at Ivy House School, in nearby Hanley. He was raised by his grandfather, also John Ward, a draper, and at one time the Chief Bailiff of Fenton. He set up his own business as a draper, remaining one for most of this life, and working from premises at 23, Stafford Street in Longton, where he lived above the shop for most of his career. He was assisted in the business by his wife, Eliza, née Cooke, two years his senior, whom he married on 15 March 1860 at St Peter Ad Vincula, Stoke. (Note: The former towns of Fenton, Hanley, Longton and Stoke are all now part of the city of Stoke-on-Trent.)

He also had a position in the offices at Lane End Colliery at Longton.

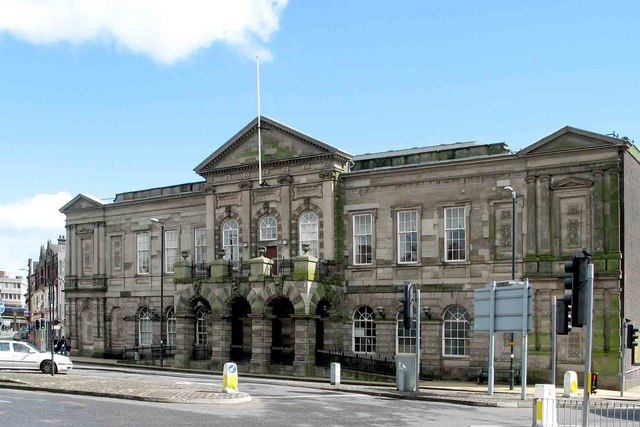
Longton Town Hall, Times Square, seat of the town council, seen in 2006

He served as a town councillor representing St Paul's Ward, being first elected on 27 February 1872 as a Conservative. He was appointed an alderman in around 1894, and more than once declined invitations to be Mayor of Longton. He was chairman of the Library Committee for Longton, responsible for developing the town's library, in whose establishment he had earlier played a key role, not least by arranging the transfer of the Longton Athenæum and Mechanics Institution, of which he was honorary secretary, to the town council, to form the basis of the library collection.

He was also a guardian of the poor for Stoke, and a magistrate.

He attended Stafford Street Wesleyan Church, and served as a master of the Etruscan Lodge of the Freemasons.

== Scientific activities ==
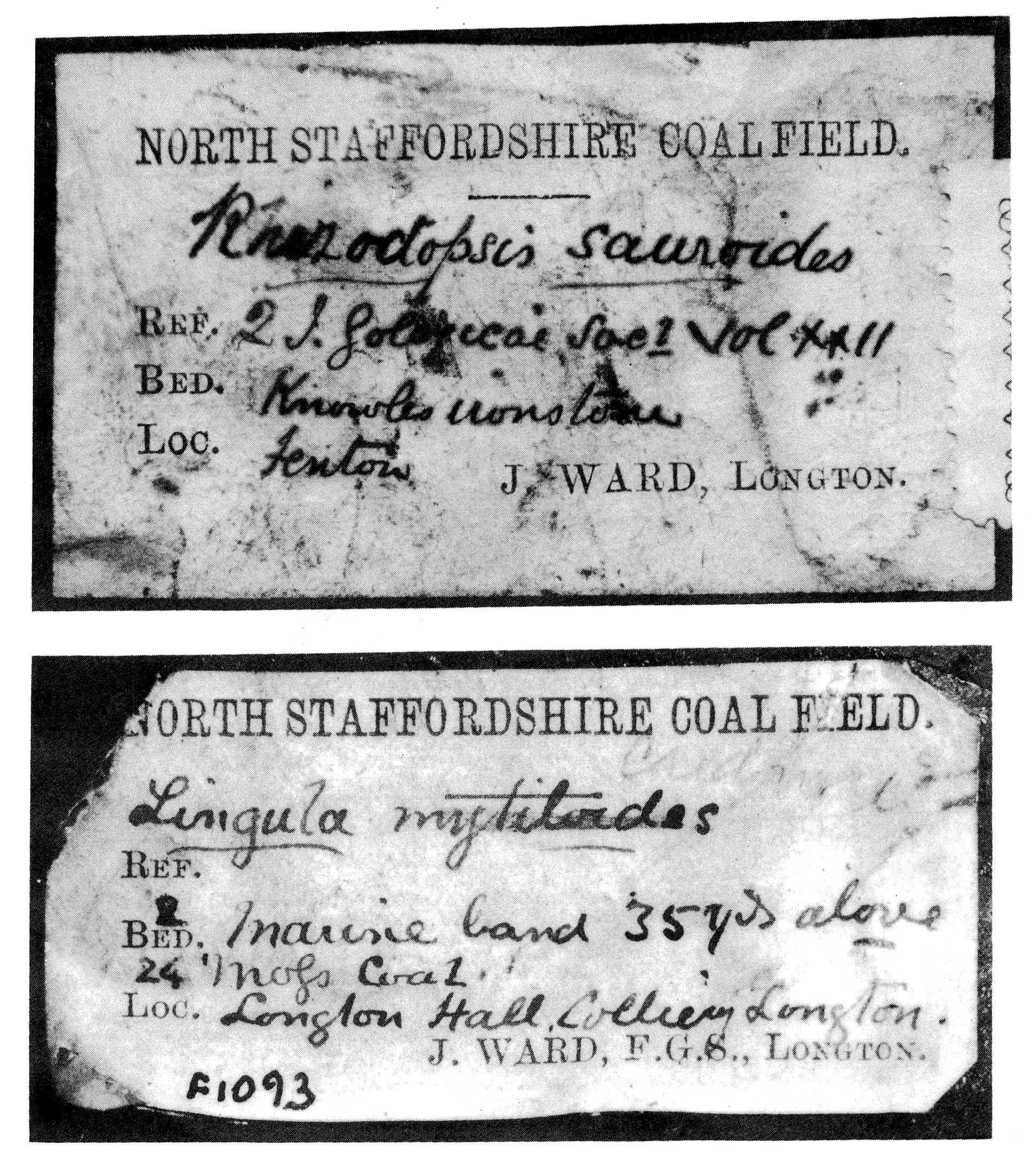
Two typical specimen labels, hand-written by Ward on his own pre-printed blanks

As a youth, Ward was encouraged by Robert Garner (Note: Garner was author of the "Natural History of the County of Stafford" (1844); see his Wikisource page.) in the study of geology. He became particularly interested in, and collected, fossils found in the mines of the North Staffordshire Coalfield, especially those of fishes, and of molluscs and trees.

In 1865 he attended what was to become the inaugural meeting of the North Staffordshire Naturalists Field Club (from 1897, "North Staffordshire Field Club"), and was an active member for the next forty years, serving in a number of roles, not least president for 1875–1876, and subsequently vice-president.

Specimens he collected were displayed in his premises at Longton, where he was known for his hospitality to curious naturalists. The specimens were loaned to or visited, studied and described by, among others, James William Davis, Sir Philip de Malpas Grey Egerton, Wheelton Hind, Thomas Henry Huxley, Robert Kidston, Ramsay Heatley Traquair, Arthur Smith Woodward, and John Young.

Between 1861 and 1906 he published 29 papers in a variety of journals. These include "The Geological Features of the North Staffordshire Coalfields," (1890), published by the North Staffordshire Institute of Mining and Mechanical Engineers and running to 189 pages, plus plates, some of which were drawn by Traquair. It included Ward's description of a new fish species, Diplodus equilateralis, now considered a synonym of Orthacanthus gibbosus. He also wrote chapters for Walcot Gibson's "The Geology of the North Staffordshire Coalfields", published by the British Geological Survey in 1905.

Ward learned French in order to understand scientific publications in that language.

A major part of his collection of fossil fishes, and some of amphibians, was purchased by the Trustees of the British Museum (Note: Now the Natural History Museum, London) in 1894 (he had donated to them some fossil bivalves in 1884). Other specimens are in the Royal Scottish Museum, Leicester Museum, the Manchester Museum, the Potteries Museum & Art Gallery (which holds 798 of his specimens), Bolton Museum, and the Hancock Museum, as well as the Queensland Museum in Australia and in museums in mainland Europe and America.

A 19-page booklet, "Fossil Fishes of Fenton and Longton: The John Ward Collection", by Don Steward, was published by Stoke's City Museum and Art Gallery (now Potteries Museum & Art Gallery) in 1994.

== Honours ==
Ward was elected a Fellow of the Geological Society in 1874. In 1899 he was given a moiety (a financial award) by the Lyell Geological Fund "in recognition of his prolonged devotion to geological research", He was made an honorary member of the North Staffordshire Institute of Mining Engineers. He was presented with a four-volume set of "Faune du Calcaire Carbonifere de la Belgique" [Fauna of the Carboniferous Limestone of Belgium] by the Natural History Society of Belgium.

In 1895, the North Staffordshire Naturalists Field Club awarded him its Garner Memorial Medal, named after Robert Garner, "for research into, and papers on, the Geology and Paleontology of the North Staffordshire Coalfields". On presenting the medal, the club's then president Wheelton Hind stated that Ward:

had established his name as one of European fame. There was hardly a museum in Europe [...] in which there was not some tangible proof of Mr. Ward's geological labours.

Ramsay Heatley Traquair named the fish genus Wardichthys in 1875, "In honour of Mr. J. Ward, of Longton, Staffordshire, to whom I am indebted for much valuable assistance in the study of Carboniferous fishes."

Species named in his honour include:

- Acanthodes wardi Egerton 1866,
- Mesolepis wardi Young 1866
- Palaeoniscus wardi Ward 1875; (Note: Palaeoniscus wardi was named by Young ("1875. Palæoniscus wardi, J. Young, Proc. Nat. Hist. Soc. Glasgow, vol. ii. pt. i. p. 66 (name only).") but described by Ward ("1875. Palæoniscus wardi, J. Ward, [Proc.] N. Staffs. Nat. Field Club, p. 289."), later the same year.) recombined as Rhadinichthys wardi Woodward 1891
- Orthacanthus wardi Davis 1880 (as Pleuracanthus wardi)
- Anthracomya wardi Etheridge 1890 now Anthraconaia wardi
- Listracanthus wardi Woodward 1903. (Note: Sometimes erroneously stated as Woodward 1891; now regarded as a synonym of Acanthorhachis spinatus.)

All are fish, apart from Anthraconaia wardi, which is a mollusc.

== Death and legacy ==
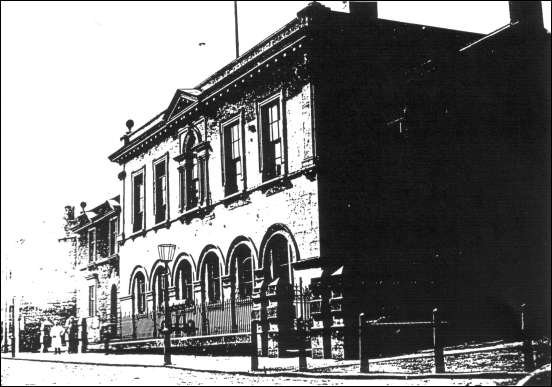
Longton Courthouse, Commerce Street, seen circa 1875

Ward died on 30 November 1906 at his home at 58, Stone Road in Longton, after a period of ill health, caused by a malignant tumour, through which time he continued to work on palaeontological research. He was survived by his wife. His funeral took place on 4 December at Longton Borough Cemetery, where he was buried. Flags on Longton Town Hall and courthouse were flown at half-mast.

An obituary by Arthur Smith Woodward was published in Geological Magazine, another in the annual report of the North Staffordshire Field Club for 1906/1907, and one in the Staffordshire Sentinel on 3 December, repeated with details of his funeral on 8 December. The Sentinel obituary included notes on his scientific career by Wheelton Hind.

His family donated his books and some fossils to the Mining Institute; the books are now in special collections of the library of the University of Staffordshire.

In 1952, John Myers gave his presidential address to the North Staffordshire Field Club, entitled "The Geological Work of John Ward, Wheelton Hind and J. T. Stobbs".

Don Steward, writing in Geological Curator, the journal of the Geological Collections Group, a body for professional curators, described him in 1984 as "a world renowned palaeontologist whose name will always be associated with a remarkable collection of Carboniferous fossil fish obtained from the Potteries Coalfield."
