= John Orr (businessman) =

Irish South African businessman

Mayor of Kimberley
- In office 1909-1910; 1916-1918

Personal details
- Born: 7 January 1858 Benburb, County Tyrone, Ireland
- Died: 30 June 1932 (aged 74) Dublin, Ireland
- Spouse: Mary Ellen Harper (m. 1892)
- Children: 5
- Occupation: Businessman, proprietor
- Known for: Founding John Orr's

John Orr (7 January 1858 – 30 June 1932) was an Irish South African businessman who founded the department store John Orr's, eventually sold to Mr. Price.

== Early life and education ==
John Orr was born on 7 January 1858 in Benburb, County Tyrone, Ireland, to Dickson and Letitia Orr. He was educated in Ireland.

== Career ==
Orr emigrated to the Union of South Africa in 1883, aged 25. He worked for Garlicks department store in Cape Town, and then opened his own store in that city.

In 1885, he moved to Kimberley and opened a clothing and fabrics store on Jones Street (now Phakamile Mabija Street) for many decades. After his brother Joseph joined him in 1891, they established a chain of stores around the country called John Orr's. There were large stores in Durban, Johannesburg, and Benoni, as well as in Lourenço Marques (now Maputo), Mozambique. In 1951, John Orr's became a public company, with 2,500 employees.

== Other work and honours ==
Other activities include:

- Mayor of Kimberley (1909–1910 and 1916–1918)
- Board member of the Alexander McGregor Memorial Museum
- Founder, Kimberley Horticultural Society

He was made a Member of the Order of the British Empire in 1918.

== Personal life ==
In 1892, he married Mary Ellen Harper, with whom he had three sons and two daughters.

== Death and legacy ==
Orr died on 30 June 1932 in Dublin.

Orr's house on Lodge Road, Dunluce, or Lillienville as it was first known, was designed by D. W. Greatbatch for Gustav Bonas, a diamond buyer, in 1897. In 1902, Orr bought the house for the sum of £6 400, and gave it the name Dunluce. In 1974, Barlow Duce bought the house, restored it, and donated it to the McGregor Museum.

Patrick Lambie, the Springbok rugby player, is an Orr's great-great-grandson; Orr's granddaughter is Lambie's grandmother, Alizanne Labuschagne, whose husband was Nic Labuschagne of KwaZulu-Natal rugby and an England rugby International.
