= John Keeling =

John Keeling may refer to:

- John Keeling (politician) (1586–1649), English lawyer and politician
- John Keeling (rugby union) (1925–2009), English international rugby union player
