= Guy Hind =

England international rugby union player

- Full name: Guy Reginald Hind
- Born: 4 April 1887 Stoke-on-Trent, Staffordshire, England
- Died: 8 November 1970 (aged 83) Newcastle-under-Lyme, Staffordshire, England
- Notable relative(s): Wheelton Hind (father); W. M. Hind (grandfather)
- Occupation: Physician / surgeon

Rugby union career
- Position: Forward
International career
Years	Team	Apps	(Points)
1908	Anglo-Welsh	2	(0)
1910–11	England	2	(0)

Guy Reginald Hind (4 April 1887 – 8 November 1970) was an English international rugby union player.

== Biography ==
A native of Stoke-on-Trent, Hind was the second-born son of surgeon Wheelton Hind and a grandson of botanist William Marsden Hind. He attended Haileybury and Imperial Service College, then followed his father into medicine.

Hind, a forward, was involved in hospital's rugby and also played for Blackheath. In 1908, Hind travelled to Australasia with the British Lions side (then known as Anglo-Welsh) and featured in two of the three matches against the All Blacks, amongst 14 tour appearances. He later gained two England caps, debuting in their 1910 Calcutta Cup win over Scotland, before a match against Ireland at Lansdowne Road the following year.

== See also ==
- List of England national rugby union players
- List of British & Irish Lions players
