= Albert Elliott =

English rugby union player

- Born: Albert Ernest Elliott; 5 March 1869 Southampton, England
- Died: 1 December 1900 (aged 31) Middelburg, South Africa
- School: Cheltenham College
- University: St John's College, Cambridge

Rugby union career
- Position: Forward
Amateur team(s)
| Years | Team | Apps | (Points) |
- Cambridge University R.U.F.C.
- St. Thomas' Hospital
| 1894-? | Barbarian F.C. | | |
International career
| Years | Team | Apps | (Points) |
| 1894 | England | 1 | (0) |

Albert Ernest Elliott (5 March 1869 – 1 December 1900) was an English rugby union player who played club rugby for Cambridge University and St. Thomas' Hospital. Elliott gained his only international cap when he was selected for England in 1894. He is also notable for being one of the few international rugby players to die serving during the Boer War.

== Personal history ==
Percival was born in Basset Mount, Southampton in 1869, the youngest son of Thomas Christopher Elliot, a merchant, and Mary Jane Mason. He was educated at Cheltenham College before matriculating to St John's College, Cambridge in 1888. He received his BA in 1891, and continued his medical training at St Thomas' Hospital in London. He completed his studies in 1898, gaining his diploma of Licentiate of the Royal College of Physicians that year. He became the Resident Medical Officer at Queen Charlotte's Hospital.

With the outbreak of the Second Boer War, Elliott volunteered for service, and was utilised as a medic attached to No.4 field Hospital. He was present at both the Battle of Spion Kop and Battle of Vaal Krantz and aftwards was posted at Ladysmith. He was made Civil Surgeon-in-charge of the 4th Brigade, in medical charge of the 21st, 42nd and 53rd Batteries of the Royal Artillery. He held this role until his death from fever on 1 December 1900 at Middelburg, Transvaal.

== Rugby career ==
Elliot's is first recognised as a rugby player, when he joined the Cambridge University team. He played in on Varsity Match, winning his 'Blue' in the 1891 victory over Oxford. On leaving Cambridge, he joined St Thomas' Hospital rugby team, and it was while at the hospital club he won his first and only international cap. Elliot was selected for the England team to play in the final game of the 1894 Home Nations Championship, an encounter against Scotland. Played away from home at Raeburn Palace in Edinburgh, the Scottish team won the match 6–0, and Elliot was not reselected for the next tournament. The next season, Elliott was selected to play for invitational touring side, the Barbarians.

== Bibliography ==
- Godwin, Terry (1984). The International Rugby Championship 1883–1983. Grafton Street, London: Willow Books. ISBN 0-00-218060-X.
- Griffiths, John (1982). The Book of English International Rugby 1872–1982. London: Willow Books. ISBN 0002180065.
- Marshall, Howard; Jordon, J.P. (1951). Oxford v Cambridge, The Story of the University Rugby Match. London: Clerke & Cockeran.
