= John Matthews (rugby union) =

England international rugby union player

- Full name: John Robert Clive Matthews
- Born: 14 June 1920 Hastings, England
- Died: 2 February 2004 (aged 83)
- School: Sutton Valence School

Rugby union career
- Position: Lock
International career
Years	Team	Apps	(Points)
1949–52	England	10	(0)

John Robert Clive Matthews (14 June 1920 – 2 February 2004) was an English international rugby union player.

Born in Hastings, Matthews attended Sutton Valence School and studied dentistry at Guy's Hospital.

Matthews played his club rugby with Guy's Hospital RFC, Navy, Combined Services and Harlequins. He was capped 10 times as a second-rower for England, captained Middlesex to the 1952 County Championship title and led the London Counties XV that were the only side to beat the touring 1951–52 Springboks, scoring their sole try in a 11–9 win.

== See also ==
- List of England national rugby union players
