= Wardichthys =

Wardichthys Temporal range: Tournaisian

Scientific classification
- Kingdom: Animalia
- Phylum: Chordata
- Class: Actinopterygii
- Order: †Palaeonisciformes
- Genus: †Wardichthys; Traquair, 1875

Extinct genus of ray-finned fishes

Wardichthys is an extinct genus of ray-finned fish that lived during the Tournaisian stage of the Mississippian epoch.

It was named in honour of the fossil collector John Ward (1837-1906) of Longton, Staffordshire by Ramsay Heatley Traquair in 1875.
