= William Wyatt Pinching =

England international rugby union player

Nipper Pinching
- Born: William Wyatt Pinching; 24 March 1851 Gravesend
- Died: 16 August 1878 (aged 27) at sea SS Eldorado
- School: Charterhouse School
- University: Guy's Hospital Medical School

Rugby union career
- Position: Forward
Amateur team(s)
Years	Team	Apps	(Points)
-	Guy's Hospital		
International career
Years	Team	Apps	(Points)
1872	England	1	

William Wyatt "Nipper" Pinching (1851-1878) was a rugby union international who represented England in 1872.

== Early life ==
Nipper Pinching was born on 24 March 1851 in Gravesend, the third son of CJ Pinching. He attended Charterhouse School and went on to study medicine at Guy's Hospital Medical School.

== Rugby union career ==
Pinching made his international debut on 5 February 1872 at The Oval in the England vs Scotland match. This was the only match he played.

== Later life ==
Pinching became a surgeon but his life and career were cut short when he was lost overboard from the SS Eldorado, one day's sail from Colombo, on 16 August 1878.
