= North Staffordshire Field Club =

Scientific organisation, 1865 – c. 2003

The North Staffordshire Field Club was an organisation founded in 1865 to study the natural history, geology, industrial history, folklore and local history of North Staffordshire, England. Its establishing president from 1865-70 was industrialist and banker James Bateman FRS.

== History ==
The club was founded in 1865 at a meeting convened at the North Staffordshire Infirmary by W.D. Spanton, as the North Staffordshire Naturalists Field Club. It became the North Staffordshire Naturalists Field Club and Archaeological Society in 1877, and shortened its name to North Staffordshire Field Club in 1897.

== Publications ==
The organisation produced its first printed book, Annual addresses, papers, etc. Author, North Staffordshire Field Club, in 1875, having previously published a short Annual Report for members. A history of the early years was published by R. Simms in 1886 as Coming of age of the North Staffordshire Naturalists' Field Club and Archaeological Society, 1865-1885: chronological history and bibliography of the Society. A further extensive history, including that of the various specialist sections, can be found in the Club's special 1916 Jubilee year publication. The annual Transactions were then titled North Staffordshire Field Club, Transactions and Annual Report (to 1960); this later became the North Staffordshire Journal of Field Studies (1961 to 1985) when the title ceased. A further New Series of separate Transactions with section reports was produced in booklet form from 1970-2000.

A detailed scientific survey of The Birds of Staffordshire was issued as appendices 1-9 to the Transactions and Annual report of the North Staffordshire Field Club (Vol. 64 in 1930, to Vol. 72 in 1938).

The records and publications of the Club are held at the Staffordshire Record Office and other libraries. An index to the 1961 to 1985 run of the Journal of Field Studies was published in the first issue of Staffordshire Studies journal.

The Club's Journal was extant until at least 2000.

At 2020, the archive website The North Staffordshire Field Club (1865—2003) and its legacy offers a partial bibliographic record for the Club.

== Awards ==
From 1893 the society award its Garner Medal, named in honour of the surgeon, writer, and naturalist Robert Garner (1808-1890), author of The Natural History and Antiquities of Staffordshire. Recipients included:

- 1893: Thomas W. Daltry, for his contributions to the Entomology of North Staffordshire.
- 1894: Charles Lynam, for his papers and memoirs on the Archeology of Staffordshire.
- 1895: John Ward, for research into, and papers on the Geology and Paleontology of the North Staffordshire Coalfields.
- 1896: Thomas Wardle, for his contributions to the Geology of North Staffordshire and to the Entomology of Silk.
- 1897: Wheelton Hind, for his researches into the geology and paleontology of the carboniferous period, and especially for his monographs on the Carbonicola, Anthracomya, and Naiadites, published by the Palæontographical Society.
- 1898: J. T. Arlidge, in recognition of the active part he has taken in the working of the club—in its interests, and in its advancement, and as one of its chief founders.
- 1900: A. M. McAldowie, for his contributions to Natural History generally, and especially for his monograph on the Birds of Staffordshire.
- 1901: John R. B. Masefield, for his contributions to the Natural History of the County, and for his papers on the Fauna of North Staffordshire.
- 1903: Walcot Gibson, H.M. Geological Survey, for his geological work in North Staffordshire.
- 1905: Alexander Scrivener, for his contributions to the Archaeology of North Staffordshire.
- 1906: W. Wells Bladen, for his work in promoting the interests of the club, and contributions to the study of local ornithology.
- 1907: W. D. Spanton, in recognition of the important part he took in the formation of the club, and the continued interest he has taken in its progressive work throughout its existence.
- 1909: Louis H. Jahn, for his interest in the entomological work of the Club, especially in connection with the order Coleoptera.
- 1919: F. A. Hibbert, in acknowledgment of the value of his researches relating to the History of Monasticism in Staffordshire
- 1929: James A. Audley
- 1982: Edward Arthur Watkin, in recognition of his long record of service to the Club
