= Harry Millett =

England international rugby union player

- Born: 2 April 1892 Islington, England
- Died: 26 May 1974 (aged 82) Wandsworth, England

Rugby union career
- Position: Fullback
International career
Years	Team	Apps	(Points)
1920	England	1	(0)

Harry Millett (2 April 1892 – 26 May 1974) was an English international rugby union player.

Born in Islington, London, Millett played rugby for Guy's Hospital RFC and was fullback in the London Counties XV which were one of only three sides to defeat the touring 1912–13 Springboks.

Millett's England opportunity didn't come until after the war when he was capped in a 1920 Five Nations match against France at Twickenham. He was appointed captain of Richmond later that year.

== See also ==
- List of England national rugby union players
