= Robert Duncan (rugby union) =

England international rugby union player

- Full name: Robert Francis Hugh Duncan
- Born: 10 June 1896 Cardiff, Wales
- Died: 19 October 1981 (aged 85) Henley, England

Rugby union career
- Position: Front row
International career
Years	Team	Apps	(Points)
1922	England	3	(0)

Robert Francis Hugh Duncan (10 June 1896 – 19 October 1981) was an English international rugby union player.

A Cardiff-born forward, Duncan played rugby with Guy's Hospital RFC in London and was capped three times for England during the 1922 Five Nations Championship, playing matches against Ireland, France and Scotland. He also toured Wales with the Barbarians and represented Middlesex in county fixtures.

== See also ==
- List of England national rugby union players
