= Alexander Morison McAldowie =

Scottish physician, folklorist and ornithologist (1852–1926)

Alexander Morison McAldowie FRSE (16 May 1852 – 4 September 1926) was a Scottish physician, folklorist and ornithologist. As an author his topics are diverse, and he wrote in all three fields, being known either as Alex McAldowie or A. M. McAldowie.

== Life ==
He was born on 16 May 1852 in Aberdeen the son of John McAldowie. He studied medicine at Aberdeen University and graduated MB ChM with highest honours in 1875. He became Assistant Surgeon at Aberdeen Royal Infirmary. He then moved south to England to be House Surgeon at the Royal Surrey County Hospital. Finally he was Consulting Physician at the North Staffordshire Infirmary.

In 1887, he was elected a Fellow of the Royal Society of Edinburgh. His proposers were James Gregg Smith, John Charles Ogilvie Will, Robert Gray and John Gray McKendrick.

He lived most of his later life in Stoke-on-Trent, where he was a leading member of the North Staffordshire Field Club, then one of the largest and most active such societies in the British Isles. In 1900, he was awarded the club's Garner Medal " for his contributions to Natural History generally, and especially for his monograph on the Birds of Staffordshire".

== Publications ==
- On Spinal Epilepsy (1878)
- Two Cases of Meniere's Disease (1883)
- Terebene as a Generator of Ozone (1886)
- The Birds of Staffordshire (1893)
- Staffordshire Knots: The Book of the Bazaar (1895)
- Personal Experiences of Witchcraft (1896)
- Prehistoric Time Measurement in Britain (1911)
- On the Human Plantar Reflexes.
- Pwllheli, a Winter Health Resort.

McAldowie also contributed to the journal Folklore in the 1890s, mainly on the topic of possible survivals of witchcraft superstitions.
