= Japie Krige =

South African rugby union player (b. 1879, d. 1961)

Jape Krige
- Born: Jacob Daniël Krige; 5 July 1879 Klein Drakenstein, Cape Colony
- Died: 14 January 1961 (aged 81)
- School: Paul Roos Gymnasium
- Notable relative: Jannie Krige (brother)

Rugby union career
- Position: Centre
Provincial / State sides
Years	Team	Apps	(Points)
1903 - 1906	Western Province	0	(0)
International career
Years	Team	Apps	(Points)
1903 - 1906	South Africa	5	(3)
- Correct as of 1 June 2019

Japie Krige (5 July 1879 – 14 January 1961) was a South African international rugby union player who played as a centre.

He made 5 appearances for South Africa from 1903 - 1906.
