= Elizabeth Wardle =

19th century English embroiderer

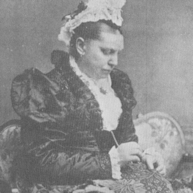
- Born: 1834
- Died: 1902 (aged 67–68)
- Occupation: embroiderer
- Spouse: Thomas Wardle

Elizabeth Wardle (1834–1902) was an English embroiderer. In 1857 she married her cousin, the silk dyer Thomas Wardle. Thomas was later knighted for his services to the silk industry.

Elizabeth lived in Leek, Staffordshire, where her husband´s business was based. She founded the Leek Embroidery Society and produced a full-scale replica of the Bayeux Tapestry.

== Life ==
Elizabeth Wardle was born to Hugh Wardle, a chemist and druggist, and his wife, also named Elizabeth. In the 1851 census, Elizabeth Wardle is listed as being a teacher, while her mother is listed as a governess, both living on Derby Street in Leek. Her father is listed as living elsewhere. In 1857, Elizabeth married Thomas Wardle, and they went to live in Leekbrook, where Thomas's father had a dye works. Six of their fourteen children were born in Leekbrook. Of those fourteen children, only ten survived early childhood. In 1866, they moved to Leek.

== Leek Embroidery Society ==
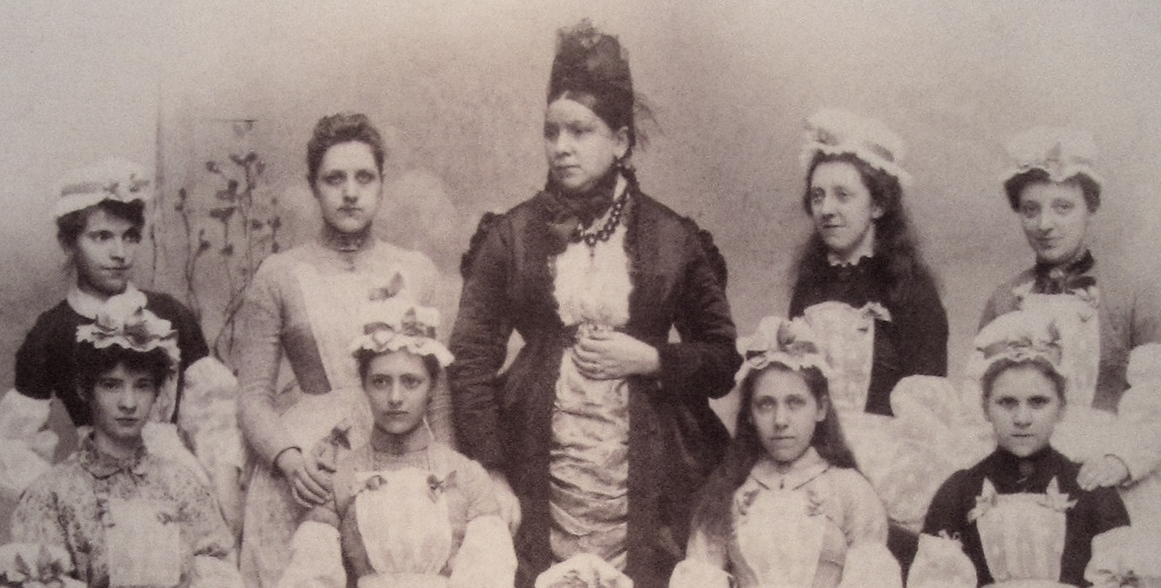
Elizabeth Wardle and her students in 1888

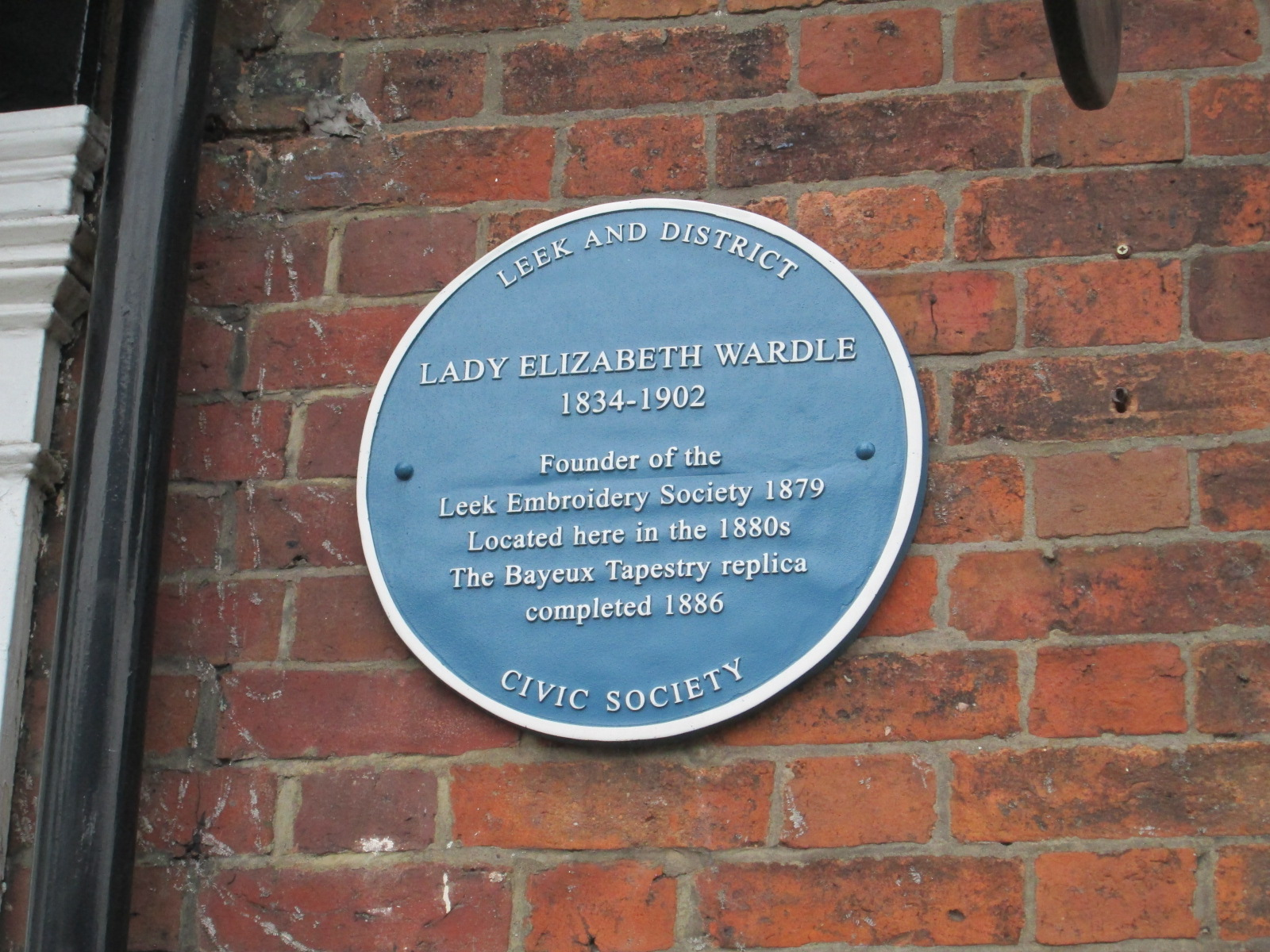
Blue plaque at 56 St Edwards Street, Leek, location of the Leek Embroidery Society

In 1879, Elizabeth Wardle founded the Leek Embroidery Society to promote art embroidery. Leek and its society became one of the leading producers of art embroidery in England, supplying several major department stores. It was closely allied with Thomas Wardle's business. When he opened a store in Bond Street, London in 1883, his advertisements noted the link with the Leek Embroidery Society. Around 1881, Elizabeth founded the Leek School of Art Embroidery, closely associated with the society. The Director of the South Kensington Museum, Sir Philip Cunliffe-Owen, wrote to Thomas Wardle to express satisfaction on the founding of the school, which would "enable classes of females to attend the schools of an evening; it would afford them the example of never having an idle moment, and further would help revive the great silk trade...."

Wardle developed a form of embroidery using "tussar silk" (a wild silk sourced from India). Her husband promoted tussar silk and expanded his business by dyeing the fibre (which had a reputation for being difficult to dye). Thomas Wardle imported some tussar silk in woven form, but the embroiders were interested in the dyed yarns, specifically floss which was suitable for embroidery thread.

Art needlework was an expression of the Arts and Crafts movement and Elizabeth has been called a leading practitioner of the art, inspired by the likes of William Morris, with whom she was acquainted. William Morris stayed in the Wardle home in Leek. He was also a designer of several works for the Leek Society.

== Bayeux Tapestry replica ==
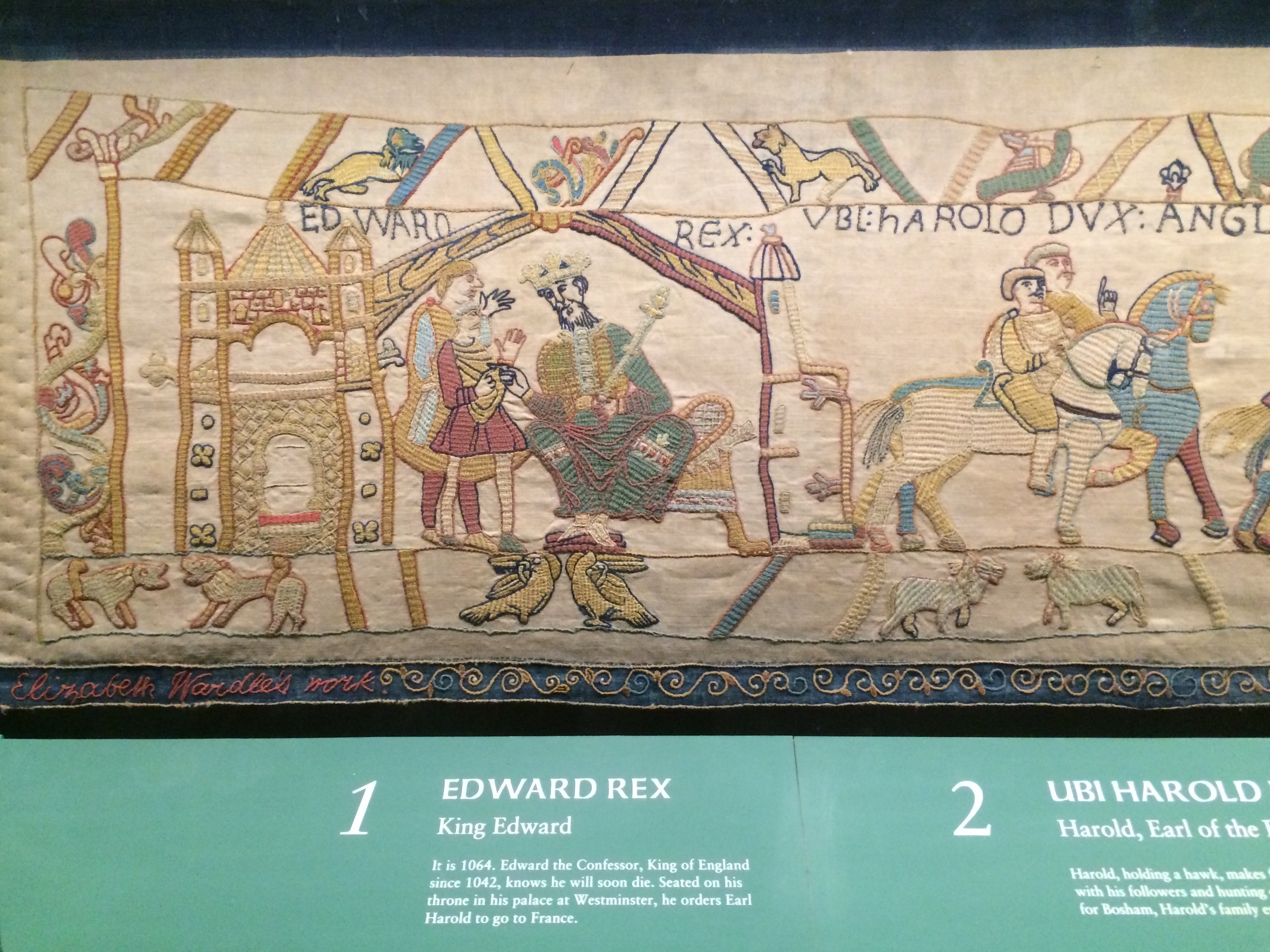
Start of the Bayeux Tapestry replica in Reading Museum

Under Elizabeth Wardle's direction, the Leek Embroidery Society created a full-scale replica of the Bayeux Tapestry. It was completed in 1886 and is now exhibited in Reading Museum. Elizabeth and Thomas had first seen the original tapestry on a visit to Bayeux in 1885 and Elizabeth determined to embroider a replica "so that England should have a copy of its own".

As the original work uses wool, the Leek embroiders avoided the use of their typical fibre, silk. Thomas produced worsted yarns for the project using vegetable rather than chemical dyes. Some 35 members of the Leek Embroidery Society and others helped create the work. The replica was exhibited in several English cities including London where it received a prize, and later was exhibited in South Africa before returning to what became its permanent home in Reading. The replica first came to Reading in 1895 and was an early exhibit in the Reading Museum art gallery, opened in 1897.

The announcement that the original Bayeux Tapestry is to go on show in London in 2026 has led to interest in the Reading version.

== Death ==
Elizabeth Wardle died in Leek in 1902 and is buried in the nearby village of Cheddleton.
