= Art needlework =

Surface embroidery

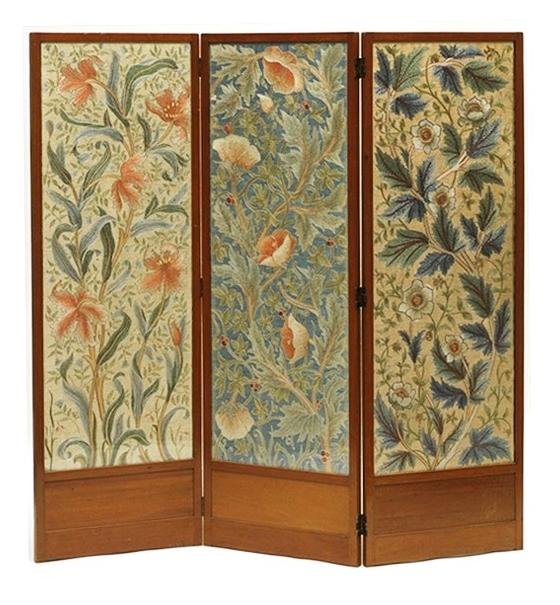
Screen embroidered in the art needlework style, 1885-1910, designed by John Henry Dearle, V&A Museum no. CIRC.848-1956.

Art needlework was a type of surface embroidery popular in the later nineteenth century under the influence of the Pre-Raphaelites and the Arts and Crafts Movement.

Artist and designer William Morris is credited with the resurrection of the techniques of freehand surface embroidery based on English embroidery styles of the Middle Ages through the eighteenth century, developing the retro-style which would be termed art needlework. Art needlework emphasized delicate shading in satin stitch with silk thread accompanied by a number of novelty stitches, in sharp contrast with the counted-thread technique of the brightly colored Berlin wool work needlepoint craze of the mid-nineteenth century.

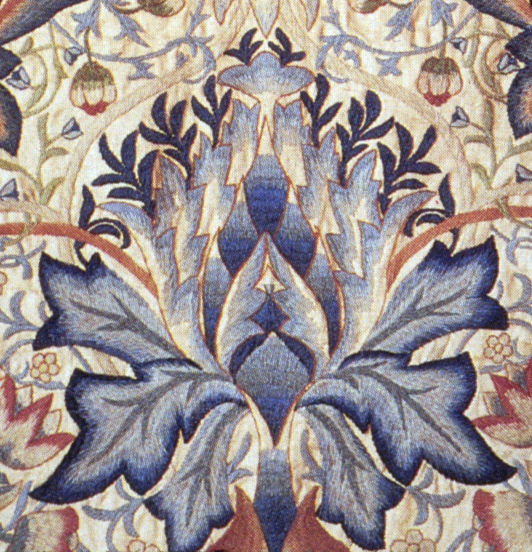
Detail of an art needlework panel in wool on linen, designed by William Morris in 1877

In embroidery as in other crafts, Morris was anxious to encourage self-expression via handcrafts. His shop Morris & Co. sold both finished custom embroideries and kits in the new style, along with vegetable dyed silks in which to work them. Art needlework was considered an appropriate style for decorating artistic dress.

The Royal School of Art Needlework (now Royal School of Needlework) was founded as a charity in 1872 under the patronage of Princess Helena to provide apprenticeships in the new/old style. Morris's daughter May, an accomplished needlewoman and designer in her own right, was active in the School from its inception.

The Leek Embroidery Society and the Leek School of Art Embroidery, both founded by embroideress Elizabeth Wardle, were established in 1879 and around 1881, respectively.

Art needlework was introduced to America at the 1876 Centennial Exposition in Philadelphia.

Contemporary art needlework is taught at a number of colleges, including Kingston University London. In partnership with the Royal School of Needlework, Kingston offers a Hand Embroidery BA (Hons) course. Similarly, the National College of Art and Design (NCAD) in Dublin, Ireland offers a BA in Textile Art & Artefact, which includes applied needlework art. In Scotland, the University of the Highlands and Islands has a similar course.
