= Nic Labuschagne =

England international rugby union player

- Full name: Nicholas Arthur Labuschagne
- Born: 26 May 1931 Durban, South Africa
- Died: 5 July 2024 (aged 93)
- School: Hilton College
- University: University of Cape Town; King's College London
- Notable relative: Patrick Lambie (grandson)

Rugby union career
- Position: Hooker
International career
| Years | Team | Apps | (Points) |
| 1953–55 | England | 5 | (0) |

Nicholas Arthur Labuschagne (26 May 1931 – 5 July 2024) was a South African-born England international rugby union player of the 1950s.

== Biography ==
Born in Durban, Labuschagne was educated at Hilton College and the University of Cape Town in his native South Africa, then came to England to study dentistry at Guy's Hospital, London.

Labuschagne, a hooker, played his English club rugby with Guy's Hospital, Harlequins and Middlesex. He was capped five times by the England national team, debuting against Wales in Cardiff in 1953. His other four England appearances came during the 1955 Five Nations Championship.

Returning to South Africa, Labuschagne became president of Natal Rugby Union.

=== Personal life ===
Labuschagne's wife Alizanne was the granddaughter of department store founder John Orr. His grandson Patrick Lambie played for the Springboks.

== See also ==
- List of England national rugby union players
