= Debenham & Freebody =

Former department store in London

Coordinates: 51.5162°N 0.1481°W

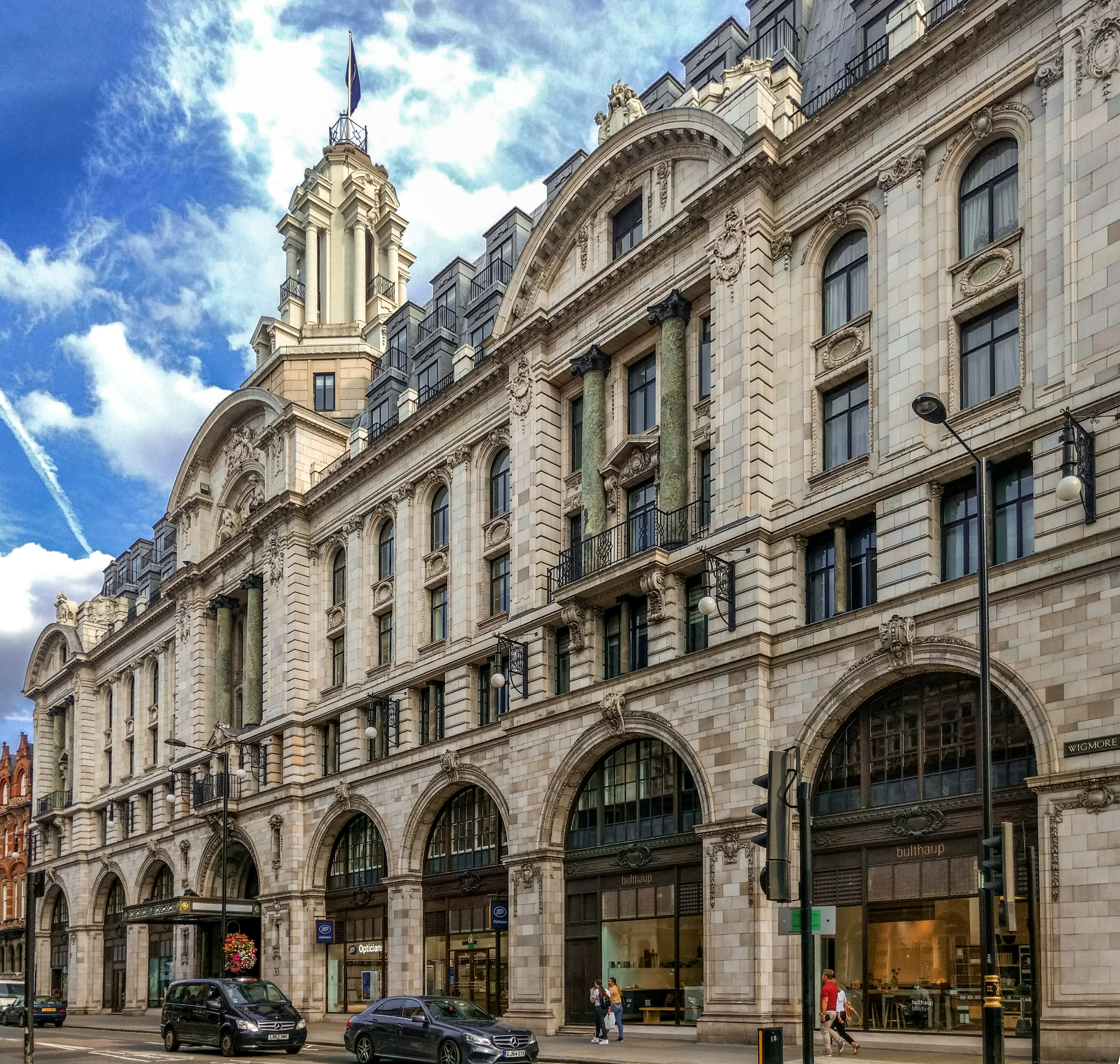
The former Debenham & Freebody department store, Wigmore Street, London.

Debenham & Freebody was a department store at 27–37 Wigmore Street, London, which became part of the Debenhams chain. The building, first opened in 1908, is now used by a variety of occupiers and is grade II listed by Historic England.

== In popular culture ==
In Agatha Christie's Murder on the Orient Express, a suspect gives the name Freebody in a fumbled attempt to divert suspicion away from another suspect, named Debenham.
