= Wheelton Hind =

English surgeon and geologist (1860–1920)

- Born: 1860; Roxeth
- Died: June 21, 1920; Stoke-on-Trent
- Scientific career
- Fields: surgery; geology

Wheelton Hind FRCS FRGS (1860, Roxeth–1920) was an English surgeon and geologist.

== Education and career ==
Wheelton Hind studied medicine at Guy's Hospital Medical School. He qualified MRCS in 1882. He graduated MB BS Lond in 1883. He was a house surgeon and resident obstetric physician at Guy's Hospital. He received his medical research MD in 1884.

At the London University he won the Gold Medal and Scholarship in organic chemistry and gained 1st class honours in physiology. He then settled in practice at Stoke-on-Trent, was Surgeon to the North Stafford Infirmary and Eye Institution, Consulting Medical Officer to the Union Infirmary, Medical Officer to the North Stafford Deaf and Blind School, and Surgeon to the North Stafford Railway.

Throughout his medical practice his chief recreation was field work in geology. His first published work in 1887 was an account of "The Natural Features of Geology of Suffolk" in his father's work The Flora of Suffolk. Following Charles Lapworth's pioneering method of studying index fossils, Hind applied the method to the stratigraphy of Carboniferous rocks in Staffordshire.

His success in discovering the regular order in which the different assemblages of fossils occurred in Staffordshire and Derbyshire gradually led him further afield. He co-operated with members of the Geological Survey, and after extended researches in Lancashire and Yorkshire he joined Mr. J. Allen Howe in 1901 in contributing to the Geological Society of London a fundamentally important memoir on the classification of the Lower Carboniferous rocks of north-central England.

Wheelton Hind published numerous articles in the Transactions of the North Staffordshire Naturalists' Field Club. His monograph On the Lamellibranch and Gasteropod Fauna found in the Millstone Grit of Scotland was a revision of the stratigraphy of Carboniferous Mollusca and won him the honour of the Keith Medal.

In 1914 he rapidly recruited men to form a battery of Garrison Artillery, and led them to the Western Front. The battery fought in some important engagements. He was soon transferred as Temporary Lieutenant-Colonel RAMC and returned to England at the end of WWI.

== Family ==
Wheelton Hind was the third son of the botanist, Reverend William Marsden Hind. He was rector of Honington, Suffolk (near Ixworth), and author of The Flora of Suffolk. Wheelton Hind married Wilhelmina Maria Manfield (b. 1859) in 1884. His mother was Rev. Hind's second wife, Anne Wheelton, the daughter of John Wheelton, who had married in 1856.

== Honours and awards ==
- 1888: Fellow of the Royal College of Surgeons (FRSC)
- 1897: Garner Medal
- 1907: Keith Medal
- 1917: Lyell Medal

In 1897, he was awarded the North Staffordshire Field Club's Garner Medal "for his researches into the geology and palæontology of the carboniferous period, and especially for his monographs on the Carbonicola, Anthracomya, and Naiadites, published by the Palæontographical Society".

== Selected publications ==
- A Monograph on Carbonicola, Anthracomya, and Nadiadites, 1894–1896. Vol. 3 parts. London: Printed for the Palæontographical Society by Adlard & Son.
- A Monograph of the British Carboniferous Lamellibranchiata, 1896–1905. Vol. 2 vols. London: Printed for the Palæontographical Society by Adlard & Son.
- "Le Faunes conchyliologiques de terrain houiller de la Belgique étudiées dans leur rapports avec les faunes homotaxiales de houiller d'Angleterre". Mémoires du Musée royal d'Histoire naturelle de Belgique. 21: 3–15. 1911.
