= Walcot Gibson =

British geologist

Dr Walcot Gibson FRS FRSE (24 August 1864 – 28 November 1941) was a British geologist. His main tasks involved mapping the coalfields of Wales and the Midlands.

== Life ==
He was born in Bromsgrove on 24 August 1864, the son of a bank manager. He was educated at Bromsgrove School then Mason Science College in Birmingham (where he was the first geological pupil under Charles Lapworth) and then the Royal College of Science in London. From 1889 to 1891 he did geological work in South Africa in the Rand goldfields and from 1891 to 1893 worked in East Africa.

In 1893, he returned to Britain and obtained a post at HM Geological Survey where he rose to the level of Assistant Director. His main tasks involved mapping the coalfields of Wales and the Midlands.

In 1903, he was awarded the North Staffordshire Field Club's Garner Medal "for his geological work in North Staffordshire".

In 1921 he was elected a Fellow of the Royal Society of Edinburgh. His proposers were John Horne, Ben Peach, Sir John Smith Flett and Robert Kidston.

He was elected a Fellow of the Royal Society in 1925 and won the Murchison Medal of the Geological Society of London in 1924.

He retired in 1925 and died in Cambridge 28 November 1941.

== Publications ==
- The Geology of Coal and Coal-Mining
- Coal in Great Britain
- The Geology of the North Staffordshire Coalfields (1905)

several articles of African origin in the 1911 Encyclopædia Britannica

== Family ==
He married Annie Olive Landon in 1895 but they did not have children.
