= Herbert Archer =

English rugby union player

- Born: 14 August 1883 Bridgwater, Somerset, England
- Died: 26 December 1946 (aged 63) West Penwith, Cornwall, England
- School: Blundell's School
- Occupation: General practitioner / Surgeon

Rugby union career
- Position: Forward
International career
Years	Team	Apps	(Points)
1908	Anglo-Welsh	3	(0)
1909	England	3	(0)

Herbert Archer (14 August 1883 – 26 December 1946) was an English international rugby union player.

Born in Bridgwater, Somerset, Archer was educated at Blundell's School in Devon from 1896 to 1903, before further studies at the University of Bristol and Guy's Hospital.

Archer, a forward, played rugby for his hospital and Somerset club Bridgwater & Albion RFC. He went on tour in 1908 with the British Lions (then known as Anglo-Welsh) and made 18 appearances over the course of the trip, including all three internationals against the All Blacks. In 1909, Archer was capped three times for England.

During World War I, Archer served as an officer in the Royal Army Medical Corps.

Archer was honorary surgeon at the Bristol Royal Infirmary and had a practice in Nether Stowey. He retired to Edington and was spending Christmas with his daughter's family in Cornwall when he died in 1946.

== See also ==
- List of England national rugby union players
- List of British & Irish Lions players
