= Martin Regan =

England international rugby union & league player

- Born: 24 September 1929 St Helens, Lancashire, England
- Died: 29 October 2014 (aged 85)

Rugby union career
- Position: Fly-half
International career
Years	Team	Apps	(Points)
1953–56	England	12	(3)
- Rugby league career

Playing information
- Position: Stand-off / Centre
Club
Years	Team	Pld	T	G	FG	P
1956–61	Warrington Wolves	64				72

Martin Regan (24 September 1929 – 29 October 2014) was an English rugby footballer.

Born in St Helens, Lancashire, Regan was the son of a rugby league player, who competed beside the renowned Albert Rosenfeld in matches for the Army. He attended West Park Catholic Grammar School.

Regan, a Liverpool fly-half, was capped 12 times for England in rugby union between 1953 and 1956. This included all four matches of England's triple crown-winning 1954 Five Nations campaign.

From 1956 to 1961, Regan played rugby league for the Warrington Wolves.

Regan was a games master at St Anselm's College in Birkenhead for many years.

== See also ==
- List of England national rugby union players
