= Jannie Krige =

England international rugby union player

- Full name: Johannes Albertus Krige
- Born: 6 June 1891 Caledon, South Africa
- Died: September 1946 (aged 55) Caledon, South Africa
- Notable relative: Japie Krige (brother)

Rugby union career
- Position: Centre
International career
Years	Team	Apps	(Points)
1920	England	1	(0)

Johannes Albertus Krige (6 June 1891 – September 1946) was a South African-born England rugby union international.

Born in Caledon, Cape Province, Krige was the son of a reverend and a younger brother of Springbok Japie Krige.

Krige was capped for England while studying and playing rugby at Guy's Hospital in central London. He made his solitary appearance against Wales at Swansea in the 1920 Five Nations, forming a centre combination with Ernie Hammett, who was also on debut. After obtaining his dentistry degree in 1921, Krige returned home to South Africa.

== See also ==
- List of England national rugby union players
