= Patrick Sykes =

England international rugby union player

Patrick William Sykes
- Born: 3 March 1925 Vancouver, British Columbia, Canada
- Died: 14 January 2014 (aged 88) Devon, England
- School: St John's School, Leatherhead

Rugby union career
- Position: Scrum-half
International career
| Years | Team | Apps | (Points) |
| 1948–1953 | England | 7 | |

Patrick William Sykes (3 March 1925 in Vancouver, British Columbia, Canada – 14 January 2014) was an England international rugby union footballer. He was educated at St John's School, Leatherhead and made his England debut on 29 March 1948 against France. In total he played 7 times for England.
