= Patrick Lambie =

South Africa international rugby union player

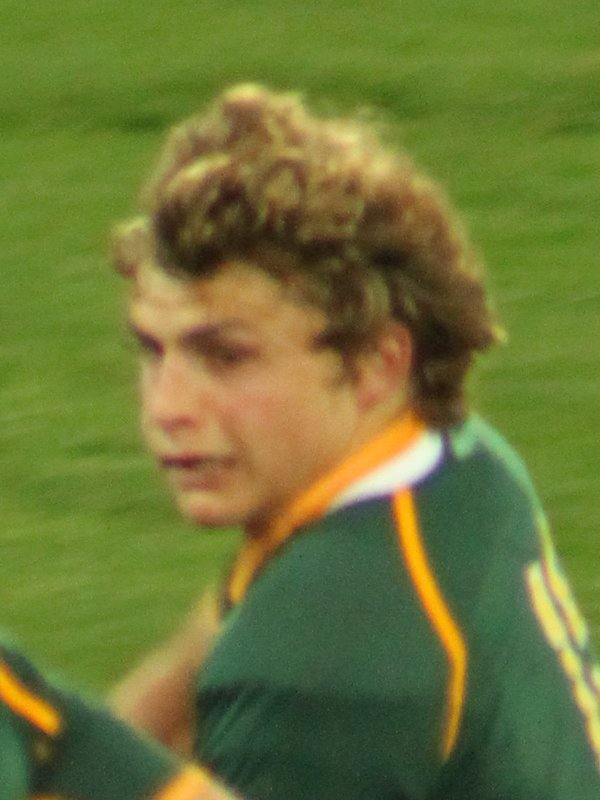
- Full name: Patrick Jonathan Lambie
- Born: 17 October 1990 (age 36) Durban, South Africa
- Height: 1.77 m (5 ft 9 1/2 in)
- Weight: 87 kg (13 st 10 lb; 192 lb)
- School: Michaelhouse, Clifton Primary School
- Notable relative(s): Nic Labuschagne (grandfather); Peter Brown; Gordon Brown
- Occupation: Rugby player

Rugby union career
- Position: Flyhalf / Fullback / Centre
Youth career
- 2008: Sharks
Senior career
Years	Team	Apps	(Points)
2009	Sharks Invitational XV	1	(5)
2009–2017	Sharks (Currie Cup)	30	(329)
2010–2017	Sharks	71	(746)
2017–2018	Racing 92	18	(60)
- Correct as of 21 January 2019
International career
Years	Team	Apps	(Points)
2008	South African Schools	1	(5)
2010–2016	South Africa (tests)	56	(153)
2010	South Africa (tour)	1	(0)
2010	South Africa U20	5	(75)
2013	Barbarians	3	(21)
2015	Springboks	1	(4)
2016	Springbok XV	1	(6)
- Correct as of 6 April 2018
Medal record
Men's Rugby union
Representing South Africa
Rugby World Cup
Bronze medal – third place	2015 England	Squad

Patrick Jonathan Lambie (born 17 October 1990) is a retired South African professional rugby union player who represented the Sharks and Racing 92, and played fly-half, fullback and centre. Widely regarded as one of the most composed and talented South African players of his generation, he earned 56 Test caps for South Africa between 2010 and 2016. He concluded his career with Racing 92 in the French Top 14 before announcing his retirement in January 2019 due to multiple concussions.

== Early life ==
Lambie was born to Ian Lambie and Catherine (née Labuschagne) Lambie. He attended Clifton Preparatory in Durban before enrolling at Michaelhouse from 2004 to 2008, where he was head boy and captained both the rugby and cricket teams. During this time he represented KwaZulu-Natal at Craven Week in 2007 and 2008 and was selected for the South African Schools side in both years. In 2010 he became Michaelhouse’s first Springbok rugby player in the school’s 115-year history.

Lambie comes from a family with strong Scottish and English rugby heritage. His father Ian spent the first twelve years of his life in Troon, Scotland, and later played provincial rugby for Natal in the 1980s. His maternal grandfather, Nic Labuschagne, played hooker for England, Natal and the Barbarians, and later served as president of the Natal Rugby Union. Through his paternal line he is related to former Scotland internationals Peter Brown and Gordon Brown, with Brown’s grandmother being the sister of Lambie’s great-grandmother. He also holds a British passport.

== Club career ==
=== 2009 Season: Sharks junior career and professional debut ===
Lambie enjoyed a successful season for the Sharks Under-21 side in 2009, finishing as the leading points scorer in the ABSA U21 Currie Cup with 192 points, despite only turning 19 that year. He helped the side reach the U21 ABSA Currie Cup final, where they were narrowly beaten by the U21 Free State Cheetahs. He also made his senior debut later that season in the 2009 Currie Cup, appearing at centre off the bench against the Griquas.

=== 2010 season ===
Lambie made his Super Rugby debut at fullback for the Sharks against the Highlanders on 20 March 2010. His debut coincided with the end of the Sharks’ five-match losing streak, and he went on to start the next seven consecutive games, scoring two tries during this period.

He transitioned between fullback, centre and fly-half during the year, becoming the Sharks’ first-choice No.10 during the 2010 Currie Cup. He played in all sixteen Currie Cup matches, coming off the bench in just one of them, and finished the competition with 205 points, the second-highest tally that season.

In the Currie Cup final he delivered one of the standout performances of his career, scoring 25 points in the Sharks’ 30–10 victory over Western Province, earning the Man-of-the-Match award. Across all competitions in 2010, he played 24 matches for the Sharks, winning 19 and scoring 215 points.

=== 2011 season ===
Lambie began the 2011 Super Rugby season as the Sharks’ starting fly-half, opening the campaign against the Cheetahs and scoring eleven points through a converted try and three penalties. In the second round he delivered a strong performance, scoring 21 points (a try, four penalties and two conversions) in a 26–12 victory over the Blues, earning the Man-of-the-Match award. He followed this with another Man-of-the-Match display in Round 3 against the Western Force.

Despite breaking a finger mid-season and missing several matches, Lambie still amassed 193 points (including four tries) in the 2011 Super Rugby tournament, setting a Sharks record for the most points scored in a single season. His strong Super Rugby form contributed to his selection for the Springboks that year.

He later featured in the 2011 Currie Cup, starting in the Sharks’ semi-final victory over the Blue Bulls and in the final, where the side lost 42–16 to the Golden Lions.

=== 2012 season ===
Lambie played 13 matches in the 2012 Super Rugby season, scoring 141 points and helping the Sharks reach the final, where they were defeated 37–6 by the Chiefs.

The Sharks opened their campaign with an 18–13 loss to the Bulls, where Lambie converted a try and kicked two penalties. The following week they were edged 15–12 by the Stormers, with Lambie again contributing the bulk of the Sharks’ points. He continued to play a key role in the weeks that followed, scoring 39 points across matches against the Lions, Reds and Waratahs.

During the match against the Waratahs Lambie suffered a dental injury, which ruled him out for two weeks and caused him to miss fixtures against the Brumbies and Hurricanes. On return, he played against the Blues and scored nine points in a narrow contest. Lambie also produced a Man-of-the-Match performance against the Highlanders, scoring all his team's 28 points as the Sharks built momentum towards the playoffs. However, further injury kept him out of the qualifier against the Reds and the semi-final against the Stormers, though he returned for the final in Hamilton against the Chiefs.

Lambie’s domestic form continued in the Currie Cup, where his limited appearances were highly influential. In the opening match against the Griquas in Kimberley he set up three tries and scored 17 points. He was again named Man-of-the-Match in the semi-final after scoring 15 points from five penalties against the Blue Bulls. In the final the Sharks lost 25–18 to Western Province, with Lambie scoring all 18 of his team’s points through six penalties.

=== 2013 season ===
Lambie remained the Sharks’ first-choice fly-half throughout the 2013 Super Rugby season, delivering several match-winning performances. He kicked four penalties in a 12–6 victory over the Stormers early in the campaign, before scoring all 21 points (six penalties and a drop-goal) in a 21–12 win over the Southern Kings. In April he produced another standout performance by kicking seven penalties in a 21–17 win over the Crusaders.

Lambie carried his strong form into the domestic season, playing a central role in the Sharks’ successful Currie Cup campaign. He steered the team to a 33–22 semi-final victory over the Free State Cheetahs, scoring a try and contributing with the boot, and was singled out by coaching staff for his influence on the team’s performance. In the final he delivered one of the finest displays of his domestic career, scoring 23 points as the Sharks defeated Western Province 33–19 at Newlands to win the Currie Cup.

=== 2014 season ===
Lambie began the 2014 Super Rugby season well, including a 17-point contribution in the Sharks’ 27–9 win over the Hurricanes in February. His campaign was disrupted when he suffered a torn biceps in early April, ruling him out for several months.

He returned to the match-day squad in July and was named on the bench for the Sharks’ Super Rugby qualifier against the Highlanders, which the Sharks won 31–27 in Durban. Lambie also featured in the semi-final the following week, scoring the Sharks only points in their 38–6 defeat by the Crusaders in Christchurch.

He made only three appearances for the Sharks in the 2014 Currie Cup Premier Division after returning from injury later in the season.

=== 2015 season ===
Lambie was part of the Sharks’ leadership group during their 2015 Super Rugby season, in which the team finished 11th. His campaign was disrupted in April when he suffered a neck-vertebra injury during the match against the Crusaders, ruling him out for approximately six weeks. He returned to fitness by July, with medical staff confirming the vertebra had healed. Although named in the Sharks’ wider squad for the 2015 Currie Cup Premier Division, he did not make an appearance in the competition that season.

=== 2016 season ===
The 2016 Super Rugby season saw Lambie appointed Sharks captain. He led the team in their warm-up win against Toulon, but sustained a shoulder injury in that match, which ruled him out of most of the Sharks’ Super Rugby campaign until the final three games of the regular season. He returned in May and kicked a last-minute penalty to secure a 25–22 victory over the Jaguares in Buenos Aires.

Lambie’s season was then disrupted again when he suffered a serious concussion during the June Test series against Ireland. The injury sidelined him for several months, caused lingering symptoms. He was also prevented him from being considered for the Sharks’ Super Rugby play-offs due to not having played the minimum number of regular season games required. He returned to non-contact training in September, but the effects of the concussion limited any Currie Cup involvement that year.

=== 2017 season and move to Racing 92 ===
Lingering concussion-related issues restricted Lambie’s involvement in the 2017 Super Rugby season, and he made only a handful of appearances. He was named Sharks captain ahead of the campaign, but a vertebra injury sustained early in the season ruled him out from March until May.

Shortly after recovering, Lambie suffered another concussion following a training-ground collision with teammate Rhyno Smith in May, which ruled him out for the remainder of the season. Growing concern about the long-term viability of his career was reported at the time.

His final match for the Sharks was a 35–32 loss to the Southern Kings in Port Elizabeth on 13 May 2017, where he started at fly-half and scored eight points.

In September 2017 the Sharks granted him an early release to join French Top 14 club Racing 92.

=== 2017-2019: Racing 92 and Retirement ===
Lambie joined French club Racing 92 in September 2017 after receiving medical clearance following his concussion-affected final seasons in South Africa.

He made regular appearances during the 2017–18 Top 14 and the European Rugby Champions Cup, and in November 2017 produced a standout performance against Castres, scoring 20 points without missing a kick. He suffered another concussion in a match against Oyonnax in December 2017, with symptoms that he later said “lasted about 40 days”. He returned to play at the end of February 2018 but acknowledged he “was not at [his] best”.

He also started at fly-half in Racing’s Champions Cup semi-final victory over Munster in April 2018. In a later interview, Lambie explained that he sustained another concussion around 20 minutes into that semi-final but continued playing because he did not want to lose the opportunity to appear in the final.

His season ended prematurely when he sustained a knee ligament injury in the 2018 Champions Cup final against Leinster, ruling him out for the remainder of the campaign. Throughout this period he continued to experience ongoing concussion-related symptoms, including trembling, headaches and migraines.

Following medical advice from neurologists, Lambie announced his retirement from all rugby in January 2019 due to the cumulative effects of repeated concussions.

== International career ==
=== Junior international rugby ===
Lambie represented South Africa at Under-20 level, playing as first-choice fullback at the 2010 IRB Junior World Championship in Argentina and finishing as the tournament’s second-highest points scorer.

=== Senior international career (2010–2016) ===
Lambie received his first Springbok call-up for the 2010 end-of-year tour to Ireland and the United Kingdom. He made his Test debut on 6 November 2010 against Ireland, converting a try after replacing Morné Steyn in a 23–21 victory.

He was selected for the 2011 Rugby World Cup squad, starting at fullback in all four pool matches and in the quarter-final against Australia.

Across the 2012 and 2013 seasons he gradually became a key bench and starting option at fly-half. Notable performances include a composed display against Scotland in Edinburgh in 2012, where he contributed 13 points from the tee.

In 2013, Lambie scored his first try against the New Zealand at Eden Park in the Rugby Championship, collecting a ball tapped back in field by Zane Kirchner, in a 15–29 defeat. A month later he came on as a substitute in South Africa’s 28–8 win over Australia at Newlands.

On 27 September 2014, Lambie delivered one of his finest performances of his Test career against Australia in Cape Town, coming on as a replacement to land a drop goal and later scoring a try, sealing a 28–10 victory. Match reports noted that he “changed the contest on arrival,” providing poise and control off the bench.

A week later, on 4 October 2014, Lambie kicked a 55-metre match-winning penalty at Ellis Park to beat the All Blacks 27–25, ending their 22-match unbeaten run in the Rugby Championship. The Independent described the moment as “bringing the All Blacks juggernaut to a halt,” highlighting both the distance and pressure of the kick.

He continued to appear for the Springboks through 2015 and 2016, covering fly-half, fullback and centre. Lambie was selected for the 2015 Rugby World Cup squad, producing a strong all-round performance against Argentina in Buenos Aires prior to the tournament, and appearing in the semi-final loss to New Zealand and the third-place playoff win over Argentina, where he earned his 50th Test cap.

His Test career was effectively ended by a serious concussion sustained against Ireland in June 2016, when he was struck high and late by CJ Stander during an attempted charge-down. Stander received a red card for the challenge. Lambie made his final international appearance later that year in November against Wales.

== International Statistics ==
=== Test Match Record ===
As of 20 November 2025

Against	P	W	D	L	Tri	Pts	%Won
Argentina	5	4	0	1	–	16	80
Australia	10	5	0	5	1	14	50
England	6	5	0	1	–	34	83.33
France	1	1	0	0	–	3	100
Fiji	1	1	0	0	–	–	100
Ireland	4	2	0	2	–	16	50
Italy	3	2	0	1	–	10	66.67
Japan	1	0	0	1	–	7	0
Namibia	1	1	0	0	–	–	100
New Zealand	11	2	0	9	1	11	18.18
Samoa	3	3	0	0	–	6	100
Scotland	5	4	0	1	–	24	80
Wales	5	3	0	2	–	10	60
Total	56	33	0	27	2	151	58.93

Pld = Games Played, W = Games Won, D = Games Drawn, L = Games Lost

=== Test tries ===
Try	Opposition	Location	Venue	Competition	Date	Result	Score
1	New Zealand	Auckland, New Zealand	Eden Park	2013 Rugby Championship	14 September 2013	Loss	15–29
2	Australia	Cape Town, South Africa	Newlands	2014 Rugby Championship	27 September 2014	Win	28–10

== Retirement ==
On medical advice after repeated concussions, Lambie announced his retirement from all rugby in January 2019 at the age of 28. In an interview with Carte Blanche in early 2019, Lambie explained that he had suffered four concussions between 2016 and 2018 and continued to experience post-concussion symptoms after each one. At the time of the interview, he noted that it had been nine months since his most recent concussion but that symptoms were still present.

He later reflected in a 2024 interview with Bryan Habana on SuperSport that the 2016 collision with Ireland's CJ Stander — which resulted in a major concussion — was the moment that changed everything for his career and long-term health.

Lambie has said that the abrupt end to his rugby career was a difficult transition, commenting: “I still have days where it hurts … I see some of my friends the same age as me running around on the field and often wish I was still playing.”

== Personal life ==
Lambie married his long-term partner Kate Symons in January 2014. Lambie lives on the KwaZulu-Natal North Coast with his wife and their three sons.

After retiring from rugby, Lambie moved into residential property development in KwaZulu-Natal, working with Collins Residential on large-scale coastal and country estate projects. His work has included involvement in developments such as Zululami Luxury Coastal Estate, Seaton Estate, and Annandale Country Estate, where he focuses on project coordination, sales, and marketing.

== Honours ==
Sharks

- Currie Cup:
  - Winner: 2010
  - Winner: 2013

South Africa

- Rugby World Cup:
  - Third place: 2015

Individual

- SARU Young Player of the Year:
  - Winner: 2011
- SARU Player of the Year:
  - Nominee: 2012
- South African Team of the Year:
  - Member: 2012
