= Ernie Nicholson =

England international rugby union player

- Born: Edward Sealy Nicholson; 10 June 1912 Long Ashton, Somerset, England
- Died: 16 March 1992 (aged 79) Beccles, England

Rugby union career
- Position: Hooker
Senior career
Years	Team	Apps	(Points)
1935–36	Leicester Tigers	8	(0)
International career
Years	Team	Apps	(Points)
1935–36	England	5	(0)

Edward Sealy Nicholson (10 June 1912 – 16 March 1992), known as Ernie was a rugby union hooker who played 5 times for England in 1935 and 1936. He played his club rugby for Leicester Tigers and Oxford University.

He made his debut on 19 January 1935 against Wales at Twickenham in a 3–3 draw. Nicholson featured in all three games of the 1935 Home Nations Championship, also featuring as England beat Ireland and lost to Scotland.

Nicholson played 8 games for Leicester Tigers in the 1935–36 season. His debut was 5 October 1935, in a loss against Coventry and his final game was on 11 January 1936 in a 16–6 loss to Gloucester. His final England game was against Wales on 18 January 1936 in a 0-0 draw as part of the 1936 Home Nations Championship.
