= John Keeling (rugby union) =

England international rugby union player

- Full name: John Hugh Keeling
- Born: 28 October 1925 Cairo, Egypt
- Died: 13 February 2009 (aged 83)

Rugby union career
- Position: Hooker
International career
Years	Team	Apps	(Points)
1948	England	2	(0)

John Hugh Keeling (28 October 1925 – 13 February 2009) was an English international rugby union player.

The son of a Shell oil worker, Keeling was born in Cairo, Egypt, and completed his second schooling in Grahamstown, South Africa. He studied for a degree in dentistry at Guy's Hospital in London.

Keeling competed as a swimmer at the 1947 International University Games and the following year was capped twice for England in rugby union, playing as a hooker against the Wallabies and Wales.

During his national service, Keeling was based in Berlin with the Royal Army Dental Corps.

Keeling settled in Southern Rhodesia (later named Zimbabwe).

== See also ==
- List of England national rugby union players
