= William Marsden Hind =

English botanist (1816–1894)

William Marsden Hind (21 February 1816, Ballynure - 13 September 1894, Honington, Suffolk) was an English botanist. He was ordained as a minister of the Church of Ireland in 1841 initially working as a curate at Derriaghy, County Antrim. It was here that he started his life long involvement in botany which he continued after he moved to England in 1845. His book The Flora of Suffolk (1889) was the climax of a lifelong contribution to botany produced while he was vicar of All Saints Church, Honington.

== Early life ==
His parents, John Hind and his wife Elizabeth (née Marsden) were married in Manchester in 1810. John's father, James, had a cotton mill in Manchester. When James's business failed he moved to Belfast 1809, with John and his family moving to Belfast where he became an innovator in the emerging linen industry. He went into business with John Mulholland, providing the technical engineering knowledge to establish a highly profitable wet flax spinning mill in Belfast. In later life William became embroiled in a family dispute which led to a long court case in Dublin in which he lost several thousand pounds of investments in the firm.

== Selected publications ==
- The Trumpet Sounded: Or, England Roused to Battle Against Rome. London: Wertheim & MacIntosh. 1850.
- The flora of Suffolk: a topographical enumeration of the plants of the county, showing the results of former observations and of the most recent researches by W. M. Hind; assisted by Churchill Babington; with an introductory chapter of the geology, climate and meteorology of Suffolk by Wheelton Hind. London: Gurney & Jackson. 1889.
