= 2018 Bill Beaumont County Championship Division 3 =

- Countries: England
- Date: 5 May 2018 - 27 May 2018
- Champions: Dorset & Wilts (3rd title)
- Runners-up: Essex
- Top point scorer: (England) Sam Baker (Dorset & Wilts); 45 points
- Top try scorer: (England) Tommy Gray (Oxfordshire) (England) Jack Robinson (Oxfordshire) (England) Josh Sunley (Berkshire) (England) Sam Baker (Dorset & Wilts); 3 tries each

The 2018 Bill Beaumont County Championship Division 3 was the 14th version of the competition that is part of the annual English rugby union County Championship, organised by the RFU for the tier 3 English counties. Each county drew its players from rugby union clubs from the fifth tier and below of the English rugby union league system. The counties were divided into two regional pools (east/west) with the winners of each pool meeting in the final at the Athletic Ground in Richmond, London - a change from previous seasons, where the final was held at Twickenham Stadium. Oxfordshire were the reigning champions, having won last year's final.

By the end of the group stage, Essex did just enough by winning two tight games to top Pool 1, while Dorset & Wilts managed to win Pool 2 on bonus points despite losing their final game against Berkshire. In the final held at the Athletic Ground, Dorset & Wilts overcame Essex 24 points to 22 to claim their third Division 3 title and first since 2011. Based on results over the two years, Essex (north) and Sussex (south) were promoted to the 2019 Bill Beaumont County Championship Division 2.

== Competition format ==
The competition format is two regional group stages (west & east) with three teams in each group, each playing two games (one home, one away). Changes to the 2018 competition see a reduction in teams from seven to six as Notts, Lincs & Derbyshire have decided not to take part this season. At the end of the pool stage the top teams with the best record from each pool advance to the final held on 27 May 2018 at the Athletic Ground in Richmond, London.

A continuation from the 2017 competition is that promotion/relegation occurs every two seasons instead of one, with points accumulated over the two seasons (2017 and 2018) taken into consideration. The two highest ranked counties (one from the north/one from the south) will be promoted into the 2019 Bill Beaumont County Championship Division 2 competition, replacing the lowest ranked aggregate sides who drop down into division 3. As this is the lowest ranked tier in the county championships there is no relegation.

== Participating counties and ground locations ==
County	Stadium(s)	Capacity	City/Area
Berkshire	Holme Park	N/A	Reading, Berkshire
Buckinghamshire	Oak Lodge Meadow	N/A	Beaconsfield, Buckinghamshire
Dorset & Wilts	Slaughtergate	1,000	Gillingham, Dorset
Essex	Latton Park	N/A	Harlow, Essex
Oxfordshire	Dry Leas	4,000	Henley-on-Thames, Oxfordshire
Sussex	Roundstone Lane	1,500 (100 seats)	Angmering, West Sussex

Locations of the 2018 Division 3 county teams

== Group stage ==
=== Division 3 Pool 1 (East) ===
2018 Bill Beaumont Division 3 Pool 1 (East) Table
	County	Played	Won	Drawn	Lost	Points For	Points Against	Points Difference	Try Bonus	Losing Bonus	Points
1	Essex (Q), (P)	2	2	0	0	39	32	7	0	0	8
2	Oxfordshire	2	1	0	1	93	45	48	1	1	6
3	Buckinghamshire	2	0	0	2	42	97	-55	1	1	2
If teams are level at any stage, tiebreakers are applied in the following order: 1. Number of matches won 2. Difference between points for and against 3. Total number of points for 4. Aggregate number of points scored in matches between tied teams 5. Number of matches won excluding the first match, then the second and so on until the tie is settled
Green background means the county qualified for the final. (P) means promoted. Updated: 19 May 2018; Source: "County Championships". englandrugby.com.

==== Round 1 ====
5 May 2018
15:00

(BP) Oxfordshire	76 – 27	Buckinghamshire (BP)
	Oxfordshire

Dry Leas, Henley

==== Round 2 ====
12 May 2018
15:00

Essex	18 – 17	Oxfordshire (BP)
	Oxfordshire

Latton Park, Harlow

==== Round 3 ====
19 May 2018
15:00

(BP) Buckinghamshire	15 – 21	Essex

Oak Lodge Meadow, Beaconsfield

=== Division 3 Pool 2 (West) ===
2018 Bill Beaumont Division 3 Pool 2 (West) Table
	County	Played	Won	Drawn	Lost	Points For	Points Against	Points Difference	Try Bonus	Losing Bonus	Points
1	Dorset & Wilts (Q)	2	1	0	1	66	64	2	2	1	7
2	Sussex (P)	2	1	0	1	50	48	2	1	1	6
3	Berkshire	2	1	0	1	60	64	-4	1	1	6
If teams are level at any stage, tiebreakers are applied in the following order: 1. Number of matches won 2. Difference between points for and against 3. Total number of points for 4. Aggregate number of points scored in matches between tied teams 5. Number of matches won excluding the first match, then the second and so on until the tie is settled
Green background means the county qualified for the final. (P) means promoted. Updated: 19 May 2018; Source: "County Championships". englandrugby.com.

==== Round 1 ====
5 May 2018
15:00

(BP) Dorset & Wilts	28 – 24	Sussex (BP)
	Dorset & Wilts

Slaughtergate, Gillingham

==== Round 2 ====
12 May 2018
15:00

(BP) Sussex	26 – 20	Berkshire (BP)
	Sussex

Roundstone Lane, Angmering

==== Round 3 ====
19 May 2018
15:00

(BP) Berkshire	40 – 38	Dorset & Wilts (2BP)
	Dorset & Wilts

Holme Park, Reading

== Final ==
27 May 2018
12:00

Essex	22 – 24	Dorset & Wilts
	Dorset & Wilts

Athletic Ground, London

== Promotion aggregate table ==
In order to determine promotion to the 2019 Bill Beaumont County Championship Division 2, results from the 2017 and 2018 Division 3 competitions will be combined, with the highest ranked sides from each group being promoted. They will be replaced by the lowest ranked teams from the 2017 and 2018 Division 2 competitions. Note that Notts, Lincs & Derbyshire dropped out of the 2018 competition having played in 2017. This means that any results between them and the other sides in Division 3 East have been annulled and do not count towards promotion.

2017 and 2018 Beaumont Cup Division 3 East Table
	County	Played	Won	Drawn	Lost	Points For	Points Against	Points Difference	Try Bonus	Losing Bonus	Points
1	Essex	4	3	0	1	86	83	3	1	1	14
2	Oxfordshire	4	2	0	2	154	100	54	3	2	13
3	Buckinghamshire	4	1	0	3	89	146	-57	2	2	8
If teams are level at any stage, tiebreakers are applied in the following order: 1. Number of matches won 2. Difference between points for and against 3. Total number of points for 4. Aggregate number of points scored in matches between tied teams 5. Number of matches won excluding the first match, then the second and so on until the tie is settled
Green background means the county is promoted. Updated: 19 May 2018; Source: "County Championships". englandrugby.com.

2017 and 2018 Beaumont Cup Division 3 West Table
	County	Played	Won	Drawn	Lost	Points For	Points Against	Points Difference	Try Bonus	Losing Bonus	Points
1	Sussex	4	3	0	1	97	71	26	2	1	15
2	Berkshire	4	2	0	2	103	101	2	1	2	11
3	Dorset & Wilts	4	1	0	3	94	122	-28	2	1	7
If teams are level at any stage, tiebreakers are applied in the following order: 1. Number of matches won 2. Difference between points for and against 3. Total number of points for 4. Aggregate number of points scored in matches between tied teams 5. Number of matches won excluding the first match, then the second and so on until the tie is settled
Green background means the county is promoted. Updated: 19 May 2018; Source: "County Championships". englandrugby.com.

== Individual statistics ==
- Note that points scorers includes tries as well as conversions, penalties and drop goals. Appearance figures also include coming on as substitutes (unused substitutes not included). Statistics will also include final.

=== Top points scorers ===
Rank	Player	County	Club Side	Appearances	Points
1	(England) Sam Baker	Dorset & Wilts	North Dorset	3	45
2	(England) Ed Phillips	Oxfordshire	Banbury	2	16
3	(Spain) Carlos Casanova	Sussex	Hove	2	15
3	(England) Tommy Gray	Oxfordshire	Banbury	2	15
3	(England) Jack Robinson	Oxfordshire	Henley Hawks	2	15
3	(England) Josh Sunley	Berkshire	Redingensians Rams	2	15

=== Top try scorers ===
Rank	Player	County	Club Side	Appearances	Tries
1	(England) Tommy Gray	Oxfordshire	Banbury	2	3
1	(England) Jack Robinson	Oxfordshire	Henley Hawks	2	3
1	(England) Josh Sunley	Berkshire	Redingensians Rams	2	3
1	(England) Sam Baker	Dorset & Wilts	North Dorset	4	3
2	(England) Josh Bartlett	Berkshire	Newbury Blues	1 (Note: Due to poor press reporting it is not clear whether Josh Bartlett played in Berkshire's game away to Sussex on 12 May 2018.)	2
2	(England) Ian Jeffries	Oxfordshire	Wallingford	1	2
2	(England) Tom Emery	Oxfordshire	Henley Hawks	2	2
2	(England) David Hyde	Oxfordshire	Henley Hawks	2	2
2	(England) Phil Bardwell	Dorset & Wilts	Wootton Bassett	3	2
2	(England) Nick Carvey	Buckinghamshire	Marlow	2	2
2	(England) Chay Pollinger	Essex	Brentwood	2 (Note: Due to poor press reporting it is not clear whether Chay Pollinger played in Essex's game at home to Oxfordshire on 12 May 2018.)	2
2	(England) Charlie Russo	Essex	Thurrock	2 (Note: Due to poor press reporting it is not clear whether Charlie Russo played in Essex's game at home to Oxfordshire on 12 May 2018.)	2
2	(England) Ollie Wilson	Dorset & Wilts	Swindon	3	2

== Competition records ==
=== Team ===
Largest home win — 49 points

76 - 27 Oxfordshire at home to Buckinghamshire on 5 May 2018

Largest away win — 6 points

21 – 15 Essex away to Buckinghamshire on 19 May 2018

Most points scored — 76 points

76 - 27 Oxfordshire at home to Buckinghamshire on 5 May 2018

Most tries in a match — 12

Oxfordshire at home to Buckinghamshire on 5 May 2018

Most conversions in a match — 8

Oxfordshire at home to Buckinghamshire on 5 May 2018

Most penalties in a match — 2

Essex at home to Oxfordshire on 12 May 2018

Most drop goals in a match — 0

=== Players ===
Most points in a match — 23

(England) Sam Baker for Dorset & Wilts away to Berkshire on 19 May 2018

Most tries in a match — 3

(England) Tommy Gray for Oxfordshire at home to Buckinghamshire on 5 May 2018

Most conversions in a match — 8

(England) Ed Phillips for Oxfordshire at home to Buckinghamshire on 5 May 2018

Most penalties in a match — 2

(England) Bradley Burr for Essex at home to Oxfordshire on 12 May 2018

== See also ==
- English rugby union system
- Rugby union in England
