= Neil Hallett (rugby union) =

English rugby union player

Neil Richard Hallett
- Born: 18 February 1980 (age 46) Hammersmith, London, England
- Height: 1.80 m (5 ft 11 in)
- Weight: 189 lb (86 kg)

Rugby union career
- Position(s): Full-back, Centre, Fly-half
Senior career
Years	Team	Apps	(Points)
1999-02	Rosslyn Park	9	(68)
2003-04	Bracknell	37	(339)
2004-10	Esher	128	(1,301)
2010-12	Ealing Trailfinders	40	(473)
2012-16	Wimbledon	78	(826)
- Correct as of 29 April 2016
International career
Years	Team	Apps	(Points)
2006-07	Barbarians	4	(13)
2007	England Counties XV	2	(31)
- Correct as of 29 April 2016

Neil Hallett (born 1980) is a retired English rugby union player who played at either full-back, centre or fly-half Neil is a coach at Wimbledon. An excellent kicker, Hallett is best known for his time at Esher where he scored over 1,300 points for the club in all competitions, and he is also one of the most prolific scorers in tier 3 history (2nd all-time as of 2016-17) with over 1,400 league points scored from his time spent with at four different clubs including Esher and Ealing Trailfinders. As well as playing club rugby Hallett has also captained Surrey (winning three County Championship Shield titles) and been capped by the Barbarians and England Counties XV.

== Career ==
=== Club career ===
After starting his career at Rosslyn Park, Hallett moved to fellow National 2 side, Bracknell, mid-way through the 2002-03 season in order to gain first team rugby. It was at Bracknell that he came to prominence, enjoying an outstanding 2003-04 season which saw him come 3rd top scorer in the division with 239 points helping his side to a very respectable 7th-place finish. Despite starting the 2004-05 season with Bracknell, after just 4 games Hallett decided to join divisional rivals, Esher. It proved to be the correct decision as by the end of the season Bracknell were relegated while Esher (just) managed to stay up, with Hallett's kicking contributing greatly to his new club's survival. The period between 2005-07 was Halletts best at Esher, finishing as the divisions top scorer twice (with 302 and 398 points respectively) and culminating in the Surrey club winning the league title and promotion at the end of the 2006-07 campaign. He helped the club survive several years in tier 2 but a change to the divisional structure at the end of the 2008-09 season involving the creation of the RFU Championship meant that Esher were relegated back to tier 3 despite finishing in 12th spot.

In the summer of 2010, despite having a bit-part role in Esher's promotion from National League 1 to the Championship, Hallett decided to leave the club to join Ealing Trailfinders, playing two divisions below in National League 2 South. Back enjoying first team rugby, Hallett was part of an excellent Trailfinders side that stormed to the title, contributing 337 points in a side that included the prolific Phil Chesters who scored a record-breaking 70 tries that year. He spent a further season at the club as they just missed out on a successive promotion to Jersey before deciding to join London regional side Wimbledon as a player-coach for the 2012-13 season, combining playing with teaching at Wimbledon College. He would play the final years of his career at Wimbledon, helping them to the London 1 South title in 2015 before retiring at the end of the 2016-17 season, having helped his promoted side to a mid-table finish in National League 3 London & SE.

=== Representative career ===
Following an excellent debut season with Esher, Hallett was selected for the Surrey squad taking part in the 2005 County Plate (now Shield) competition. He took his good form into the competition that summer, helping his county to qualify from the group stage which included a man-of-the-match performance in the 38-22 win against Dorset & Wilts, scoring 28 points. After winning their semi-final fixture, Surrey faced Somerset in the Twickenham final. Having already beaten the south-west side in the group stages, Surrey once again proved too strong, Hallett contributing 9 points from the boot as he helped his side to their first taste of County Championship silverware since 1971.

His performances at club and county drew the interest of the Barbarians who included Hallett in their 2006 tour. He made his Barbarians debut in the last game of the tour, contributing a try and conversion and being named man-of-the-match as his side won 28-19 against the Georgian national team in Tbilisi in June. Further call-ups to the Barbarians would follow the next season, with appearances against the Combined Services, East Midlands and British Army to follow, although he would fail to score any further points for the Ba-Baas. In February 2007 he also made his England Counties XV debut, scoring 10 points in a 17-20 loss against an Irish Club XV at Donnybrook. A second Counties appearance followed in March, with Hallet contributing 21 points, including 2 tries, as England Counties beat France Amateurs 41-10 at the Rectory Field.

Towards the end of his career playing at Wimbledon, Hallett was still very much involved with the Surrey County side. He was called up to take part in his counties 2013 County Championship Shield campaign (formerly known as the plate) and was made captain. Despite being in the twilight of his career, Hallet showed that class was permanent, contributing 61 points including 3 tries as Surrey stormed their way through to the final. At Twickenham Surrey managed to overcome a resolute Cumbria 21-16, with Hallett's 11 points, including 3 penalties, proving to be vital as his county won their second Shield title.

The following season, Hallett would return to county action for the last team, captaining newly promoted in the 2014 County Championship Plate competition. Surrey went on to win the Plate competition, contributing 73 points overall. He saved his strongest performance for the final, with 24 points including 6 penalties, helping Surrey defeat Leicestershire 39-16.

== Season-by-season playing stats ==
=== Club ===
Season	Club	Competition	Appearances	Tries	Drop Goals	Conversions	Penalties	Total Points
1999-00	Rosslyn Park	National League 1	4	0	0	2	4	16
2000-01	Rosslyn Park	National Division 2	2	0	0	3	6	24
2001-02	Rosslyn Park	National Division 2	2	0	0	2	6	22
2002-03	Rosslyn Park	Powergen Cup	1	0	0	3	0	6
2002-03	Bracknell	National Division 2	5	1	0	10	7	46
2003-04	Bracknell	National Division 2	26	8	2	35	41	239
2003-04	Bracknell	Powergen Cup	2	2	0	5	3	29
2004-05	Bracknell	National Division 2	4	0	0	2	7	25
2004-05	Esher	National Division 2	18	1	0	37	48	223
2005-06	Esher	National Division 2	26	7	0	57	51	302
2005-06	Esher	EDF Energy Trophy	2	0	0	3	3	15
2006-07	Esher	National Division 2	24	11	0	80	61	398
2007-08	Esher	National Division 1	18	1	0	18	18	95
2007-08	Esher	EDF Energy Trophy	3	1	0	4	6	31
2008-09	Esher	National Division 1	28	3	0	55	33	224
2008-09	Esher	EDF Energy Trophy	1	1	0	4	0	13
2009-10	Esher	National League 1	8	0	0	0	0	0
2010-11	Ealing Trailfinders	National League 2 South	26	9	0	95	34	337
2011-12	Ealing Trailfinders	National League 1	14	3	0	29	21	136
2012-13 (Note: Local press reports are not available for every Wimbledon game during the 2012–13 season so it is likely that Hallett played more games and scored more points this campaign.)	Wimbledon	London 1 South	19	3	0	45	25	180
2013-14	Wimbledon	London 1 South	18	4	0	40	29	187
2014-15	Wimbledon	London 1 South	21	5	0	63	42	277
2015-16	Wimbledon	National League 3 London & SE	20	2	0	44	28	182

=== County/Representative ===
Season	Side	Competition	Appearances	Tries	Drop Goals	Conversions	Penalties	Total Points
2004-05 (Note: Press and union reports incredibly poor for 2005 Plate competition meaning only two of Surrey's games reported on. Hallett could well have played in up to 5 games in the competition and as the main kicker is very likely to have scored more points than the 37 recorded.)	Surrey	County Championship Plate	2	1	0	4	8	37
2005-06	Barbarians	Tour	1	1	0	1	0	7
2006-07	Barbarians	Test Matches	3	0	0	3	0	6
2006-07	England Counties XV	Test Matches	2	2	0	6	3	31
2012-13	Surrey	County Championship Shield	5	3	0	15	9	72
2013-14	Surrey	County Championship Plate	4	1	0	16	12	73

== Honours and records ==
Esher

- National Division 2 top points scorer (2): 2005-06 (302 points), 2006-07 (398 points)
- National League 1 champions (2): 2006-07, 2009-10

Ealing Trailfinders

- National League 2 South champions: 2010-11

Wimbledon

- London 1 South champions: 2014-15

Barbarians

- Capped 4 times: 2005-07

Surrey

- County Championship Shield winners (2): 2005, 2013 (Note: Includes 2005 title when it was known as the County Championship Plate.)
- County Championship Plate winners: 2014
