= 2019 Bill Beaumont County Championship Division 3 =

- Countries: England
- Date: 4 May 2019 – 8 June 2019
- Champions: Cumbria (1st title)
- Runners-up: Dorset & Wilts
- Top point scorer: (England) Mark Ireland (Cumbria); 57 points
- Top try scorer: (England) Ross Williams (Dorset & Wilts); 5 tries

The Bill Beaumont County Championship Division 3 was the 15th version of the competition that is part of the annual English rugby union County Championship, organised by the Rugby Football Union (RFU) for the tier 3 English counties. Each county drew its players from rugby union clubs from the fifth tier and below of the English rugby union league system. The counties were divided into two regional pools (north/south) with the winners of each pool meeting in the final at Twickenham Stadium, London.

At the end of the group stage, Cumbria won three out of three to stop Pool 1 ahead of Oxfordshire, who they defeated in the final game, while Dorset & Wilts made their second successive final by also winning all three of their games. In the Twickenham final it was Cumbria who emerged victorious, defeating Dorset & Wilts convincingly, 23-13, with tournament top scorer, Mark Ireland, kicking 13 of their points. For Cumbria it was their first Division 3 title in three attempts and first county championship silverware since 1997, while Dorset & Wilts failed to retain their title and make it a fourth win in the competition.

== Competition format ==
The competition format is two regional group stages divided into north and south with four teams in each group. This means that two teams in the pool had two home games, while the other two had just one. The RFU have taken fixtures from the previous year into account so that county sides that only played one home game in that competition now get two games and vice versa. The shield competition has increased from six to eight teams as two counties, Middlesex and Notts, Lincs & Derbyshire, have returned to the county championships after an absence of several years. At the end of the pool stage the top teams with the best record from each pool advance to the final held on 26 May 2019 which will once more be held back at Twickenham Stadium in London, having been held at the Athletic Ground in nearby Richmond the previous season.

Promotion occurs every two seasons, with accumulated points taken into consideration. At the end of the 2017–18 season, Essex and Sussex were promoted to tier 2 with Cumbria and North Midlands dropping down to replace them in tier 3. There will now be no promotion until the end of the 2020 competition.

== Participating counties and ground locations ==
County	Stadium(s)	Capacity	City/Area
Berkshire	Holme Park		Sonning, Berkshire
Buckinghamshire	Ostler's Field		Weston Turville, Buckinghamshire
Cumbria	Bower Park		Aspatria, Cumbria
Dorset & Wilts	Slaughtergate; The Sports Club	1,000	Gillingham, Dorset; Devizes, Wiltshire
Middlesex	MacFarlane Lane		Isleworth, London
North Midlands	Finstall Park; Wassell Grove		Bromsgrove, Worcestershire; Hagley, Worcestershire
Notts, Lincs & Derbyshire	The Rugby Ground	1,000 (60 seats)	Newark-on-Trent, Nottinghamshire
Oxfordshire	Marston Ferry Road	N/A	Oxford, Oxfordshire

Locations of the 2019 Division 3 county teams

== Group stage ==
=== Division 3 North ===
2019 Bill Beaumont Division 3 North Table
	County	Played	Won	Drawn	Lost	Points For	Points Against	Points Difference	Try Bonus	Losing Bonus	Points
1	Cumbria (Q)	3	3	0	0	97	56	41	1	0	13
2	Oxfordshire	3	2	0	1	72	46	26	1	0	9
3	Notts, Lincs & Derbyshire	3	1	0	2	70	92	-22	2	1	7
4	North Midlands	3	0	0	3	61	106	-45	1	1	2
If teams are level at any stage, tiebreakers are applied in the following order: 1. Number of matches won 2. Difference between points for and against 3. Total number of points for 4. Aggregate number of points scored in matches between tied teams 5. Number of matches won excluding the first match, then the second and so on until the tie is settled
Green background means the county qualified for the final. Updated: 18 May 2019; Source: "County Championships". englandrugby.com.

==== Round 1 ====
4 May 2019
15:00

North Midlands	21 – 30	Cumbria
	North Midlands; Cumbria

Finstall Park, Bromsgrove

4 May 2019
15:00

Oxfordshire	19 – 12	Notts, Lincs & Derbyshire (1 BP)
	Oxfordshire; NLD

Marston Ferry Road, Oxford

==== Round 2 ====
11 May 2019
15:00

(1 BP) Notts, Lincs & Derbyshire	25 – 41	Cumbria (1 BP)
	NLD; Cumbria

The Rugby Ground, Newark-on-Trent

11 May 2019
15:00

(1 BP) Oxfordshire	43 – 8	North Midlands
	Oxfordshire; North Midlands

Marston Ferry Road, Oxford

==== Round 3 ====
18 May 2019
15:00

Cumbria	26 – 10	Oxfordshire
	Cumbria; Oxfordshire

Bower Park, Aspatria

18 May 2019
15:00

(2 BP) North Midlands	32 – 33	Notts, Lincs & Derbyshire (1 BP)
	North Midlands; NLD

Wassell Grove, Hagley

=== Division 3 South ===
2019 Bill Beaumont Division 3 South Table
	County	Played	Won	Drawn	Lost	Points For	Points Against	Points Difference	Try Bonus	Losing Bonus	Points
1	Dorset & Wilts (Q)	3	3	0	0	145	63	82	2	0	14
2	Berkshire	3	2	0	1	137	90	47	3	0	11
3	Middlesex	3	1	0	2	56	58	-2	1	1	6
4	Buckinghamshire	3	0	0	3	31	158	-127	0	0	0
If teams are level at any stage, tiebreakers are applied in the following order: 1. Number of matches won 2. Difference between points for and against 3. Total number of points for 4. Aggregate number of points scored in matches between tied teams 5. Number of matches won excluding the first match, then the second and so on until the tie is settled
Green background means the county qualified for the final. Updated: 18 May 2019; Source: "County Championships". englandrugby.com.

==== Round 1 ====
4 May 2019
14:30

Buckinghamshire	10 – 26	Middlesex (1 BP)
	Middlesex

Ostler's Field, Weston Turville

4 May 2019
15:00

(1 BP) Dorset & Wilts	57 – 45	Berkshire (1 BP)
	Dorset & Wilts

Slaughtergate, Gillingham

==== Round 2 ====
11 May 2019
14:30

(1 BP) Dorset & Wilts	68 – 0	Buckinghamshire
	Dorset & Wilts

The Sports Club, Devizes

11 May 2019
15:00

(1 BP) Berkshire	28 – 12	Middlesex
	Middlesex

Holme Park, Sonning

==== Round 3 ====
18 May 2019
14:30

Buckinghamshire	21 – 64	Berkshire (1 BP)

Ostler's Field, Weston Turville

18 May 2019
15:00

(1 BP) Middlesex	18 – 20	Dorset & Wilts
	Dorset & Wilts

MacFarlane Lane, Isleworth, London

== Final ==
8 June 2019
11:00

Cumbria	23 – 13	Dorset & Wilts

Twickenham Stadium, London

== Individual statistics ==
- Note that points scorers includes tries as well as conversions, penalties and drop goals. Statistics also include final.

=== Top points scorers ===
Rank	Player	County	Club Side	Points
1	(England) Mark Ireland	Cumbria	Sheffield Tigers	57
2	(England) Sam Baker	Dorset & Wilts	Taunton Titans	41
3	(England) Dan Thorne	Berkshire	Newbury Blues	39
4	(England) Ross Williams	Dorset & Wilts	Warminster	25
5	(England) Rhys Harrhy	North Midlands	Bournville	21

=== Top try scorers ===
Rank	Player	County	Club Side	Tries
1	(England) Ross Williams	Dorset & Wilts	Warminster	5
2	(England) Doug Billam	Notts, Lincs & Derbyshire	Paviors	4
2	(England) Gabe Hill	Berkshire	Bracknell	4
3	(England) Connor Hayhow	Berkshire	Rosslyn Park	3
3	(England) Harry Huddlestone	Cumbria	Kirkby Lonsdale	3
3	(Fiji) Laisiasa Vinakadina	Dorset & Wilts	Warminster	3

== Competition records ==
=== Team ===
Largest home win — 68 points

68 – 0 Dorset & Wilts at home to Buckinghamshire on 11 May 2019

Largest away win — 43 points

64 – 21 Berkshire away to Buckinghamshire on 18 May 2019

Most points scored — 68 points

68 – 0 Dorset & Wilts at home to Buckinghamshire on 11 May 2019

Most tries in a match — 10 (2)

Dorset & Wilts at home to Buckinghamshire on 11 May 2019
Berkshire away to Buckinghamshire on 18 May 2019

Most conversions in a match — 9

Dorset & Wilts at home to Buckinghamshire on 11 May 2019

Most penalties in a match — 3 (4)

Cumbria away to North Midlands on 4 May 2019
North Midlands at home to Cumbria on 4 May 2019
Cumbria at home to Oxfordshire on 18 May 2019
Cumbria versus Dorset & Wilts on 8 June 2019

Most drop goals in a match — 1

Cumbria at home to Oxfordshire on 18 May 2019

=== Player ===
Most points in a match — 19

(England) Dan Thorne for Berkshire away to Buckinghamshire on 18 May 2019

Most tries in a match — 3 (3)

(England) Doug Billam for Notts, Lincs & Derbyshire at home to Cumbria on 11 May 2019
(England) Connor Hayhow for Berkshire away to Buckinghamshire on 18 May 2019
(England) Gabe Hill for Berkshire away to Buckinghamshire on 18 May 2019

Most conversions in a match — 9

(England) Sam Baker for Dorset & Wilts at home to Buckinghamshire on 11 May 2019

Most penalties in a match — 3 (4)

(England) Rhys Harrhy for North Midlands at home to Cumbria on 4 May 2019
(England) Mark Ireland for Cumbria away to North Midlands on 4 May 2019
(England) Mark Ireland for Cumbria at home to Oxfordshire on 18 May 2019
(England) Mark Ireland for Cumbria versus Dorset & Wilts on 8 June 2019

Most drop goals in a match — 1

(England) Glen Weightman for Cumbria at home to Oxfordshire on 18 May 2019

== See also ==
- English rugby union system
- Rugby union in England
