= 2015 County Championship Shield =

- Countries: England
- Date: 2 May 2015 - 31 May 2015
- Champions: Leicestershire (1st title)
- Runners-up: Cumbria

The 2015 County Championship Shield was the 11th version of the annual English rugby union County Championship, organized by the RFU for the tier 3 English counties. Each county drew its players from rugby union clubs from the fifth tier and below of the English rugby union league system. The counties were divided into three pools of four teams each, based roughly on regional lines, with the winner of each group plus the best runner-up going through to the semi-finals, with the winners of those games meeting in the final held at Twickenham Stadium. At the moment there is no promotion or relegation out of or into the County Championship Shield, although the 2014 champions Surrey moved up into tier 2, having won the competition three years in a row.

After winning their respective groups and semi final matches Leicestershire faced Cumbria in the late kick off game at Twickenham Stadium. Leicestershire made up for their defeat the previous season by defeating Cumbria 34 – 17 to win their first ever Shield trophy.

== Competition format ==
The competition format consisted of three groups of four counties each, based roughly on regional lines where possible, with each team playing each other once. The top side of each group automatically qualified for the semi-finals, as did the best group runner-up. The winners of the semi-finals played in the final held at Twickenham Stadium on 31 May 2015, As the lowest tier in the county championship there is no relegation while promotion is not given every season, although outstanding county performances (such as Surrey's) can lead to counties moving up to tier 2.

== Participating counties and ground locations ==
Locations of the 2015 County Championship Shield county teams

County	Stadium(s)	Capacity	City/Area
Berkshire	Old Bath Road	1,250	Sonning, Reading, Berkshire
Buckinghamshire	Floyd Field; Manor Fields Sports Ground	N/A; N/A	Buckingham, Buckinghamshire; Bletchley, Milton Keynes, Buckinghamshire
Cumbria	Rugby Ground; Ellis Sports Ground	1,500 (500 seats); 12,000 (2,000 seats)	Carlisle, Cumbria; Workington, Cumbria
Dorset & Wilts	Paxcroft; Bestwall Park	N/A; N/A	Trowbridge, Wiltshire; Wareham, Dorset
Essex	Goresbrook	1,000	Barking, London
Hampshire	Rugby Camp	N/A	Portsmouth, Hampshire
Leicestershire	The Rugby Ground; Vipers Rugby Ground	N/A; N/A	Market Harborough, Leicestershire; Whetstone, Leicestershire
Middlesex	Trailfinders Sports Ground	3,020	West Ealing, London
Notts, Lincs & Derbyshire	Eakring Road	1,000	Mansfield, Nottinghamshire
Oxfordshire	Greystones	N/A	Chipping Norton, Oxfordshire
Staffordshire	Hartwell Lane	N/A	Barlaston, Staffordshire
Warwickshire	Ivor Preece Field	1,500 (250 seats)	Binley Woods, Coventry, Warwickshire

== Group stage ==
=== Pool 1 ===
2015 County Championship Shield Pool 1 Table
	County	Played	Won	Drawn	Lost	Points For	Points Against	Points Difference	Try Bonus	Losing Bonus	Points
1	Leicestershire (Q)	3	3	0	0	120	25	95	3	0	15
2	Oxfordshire	3	2	0	1	94	76	18	2	0	10
3	Buckinghamshire	3	1	0	2	38	87	−49	0	0	4
4	Berkshire	3	0	0	3	45	109	−64	1	0	2
If teams are level at any stage, tiebreakers are applied in the following order: 1. Number of matches won 2. Difference between points for and against 3. Total number of points for 4. Aggregate number of points scored in matches between tied teams 5. Number of matches won excluding the first match, then the second and so on until the tie is settled
Green background means the county qualified for the Shield semi finals. Updated: 16 May 2015; Source: "County Championships". englandrugby.com.

==== Round 1 ====
2 May 2015
15:00

(BP) Leicestershire	45–14	Buckinghamshire
	Report

The Rugby Ground, Market Harborough

2 May 2015
15:00

(BP) Oxfordshire	59–27	Berkshire (BP)
	Report

Greystones, Chipping Norton

==== Round 2 ====
9 May 2015
15:00

Berkshire	5–36	Leicestershire (BP)
	Report

Old Bath Road, Sonning

9 May 2015
15:00

Buckinghamshire	10–29	Oxfordshire (BP)
	Report

Floyd Field, Buckingham

==== Round 3 ====
16 May 2015
15:00

Buckinghamshire	14–13	Berkshire (BP)

Manor Fields Sports Ground, Bletchley, Milton Keynes

16 May 2015
15:00

Oxfordshire	6–39	Leicestershire (BP)

Greystones, Chipping Norton

=== Pool 2 ===
2015 County Championship Shield Pool 2 Table
	County	Played	Won	Drawn	Lost	Points For	Points Against	Points Difference	Try Bonus	Losing Bonus	Points
1	Cumbria (Q)	3	3	0	0	73	25	48	1	0	13
2	Warwickshire	3	2	0	1	74	64	10	1	0	9
3	Staffordshire	3	1	0	2	53	80	−27	0	0	4
4	Notts, Lincs & Derbyshire	3	0	0	3	47	78	−31	0	1	1
If teams are level at any stage, tiebreakers are applied in the following order: 1. Number of matches won 2. Difference between points for and against 3. Total number of points for 4. Aggregate number of points scored in matches between tied teams 5. Number of matches won excluding the first match, then the second and so on until the tie is settled
Green background means the county qualified for the Shield semi finals. Updated: 16 May 2015; Source: "County Championships". englandrugby.com.

==== Round 1 ====
2 May 2015
15:00

(BP) Notts, Lincs & Derbyshire	23–25	Warwickshire
	Report

Eakring Road, Mansfield

2 May 2015
15:00

Staffordshire	12–20	Cumbria
	Report

Hartwell Lane, Barlaston

==== Round 2 ====
9 May 2015
15:00

Cumbria	20–0	Notts, Lincs & Derbyshire
	(Note: Cumbria awarded a 20 – 0 win, because Notts, Lincs & Derbyshire were unable to raise a squad due to injuries.)

9 May 2015
15:00

(BP) Warwickshire	36–8	Staffordshire
	Report

The Ivor Preece Field, Binley Woods, Coventry

==== Round 3 ====
16 May 2015
15:00

(BP) Cumbria	33–13	Warwickshire
	Report

Rugby Ground, Carlisle

16 May 2015
15:00

Notts, Lincs & Derbyshire	24–33	Staffordshire

The Stute, Ilkeston

=== Pool 3 ===
2015 County Championship Shield Pool 3 Table
	County	Played	Won	Drawn	Lost	Points For	Points Against	Points Difference	Try Bonus	Losing Bonus	Points
1	Dorset & Wilts (Q)	3	3	0	0	103	36	67	1	0	13
2	Essex (Q) (Note: Essex qualify for semi finals as best ranked runner up.)	3	2	0	1	106	44	62	2	1	11
3	Hampshire	3	1	0	2	51	83	−32	1	0	5
4	Middlesex	3	0	0	3	36	133	−97	0	0	0
If teams are level at any stage, tiebreakers are applied in the following order: 1. Number of matches won 2. Difference between points for and against 3. Total number of points for 4. Aggregate number of points scored in matches between tied teams 5. Number of matches won excluding the first match, then the second and so on until the tie is settled
Green background means the county qualified for the Shield semi finals. Updated: 16 May 2015; Source: "County Championships". englandrugby.com.

==== Round 1 ====
2 May 2015
15:00

Hampshire	5–38	Essex (BP)

Rugby Camp, Portsmouth

2 May 2015
15:00

Middlesex	5–50	Dorset & Wilts (BP)
	Report

Trailfinders Sports Ground, West Ealing, London

==== Round 2 ====
9 May 2015
15:00

Dorset & Wilts	24–20	Essex (BP)
	Report

Paxcroft, Trowbridge

9 May 2015
15:00

(BP) Hampshire	35–16	Middlesex
	Report

Rugby Camp, Portsmouth

==== Round 3 ====
16 May 2015
15:00

Dorset & Wilts	29–11	Hampshire
	Report

Bestwall Park, Wareham

16 May 2015
15:00

(BP) Essex	48–15	Middlesex

Goresbrook, Barking

== Knock-out Stage ==
=== Semi-finals ===
23 May 2015
15:00

Leicestershire	49–15	Dorset & Wilts
	Report

Vipers Rugby Ground, Whetstone

23 May 2015
15:00

Cumbria	18–17	Essex
	Report

Ellis Sports Ground, Workington

=== Final ===
31 May 2015
15:00

Leicestershire	34–17	Cumbria
	Report

Twickenham Stadium, London

== See also ==
- English rugby union system
- Rugby union in England
