= 1976–77 Rugby Union County Championship =

English rugby union competition

1976–77 County Championship
- Countries: England
- Champions: Lancashire (10th title)
- Runners-up: Middlesex

The 1976–77 Rugby Union County Championship was the 77th edition of England's County Championship rugby union club competition.

Lancashire won their 10th title after defeating Middlesex in the final.

== First Round ==
Pos	Northern Division	P	W	D	L	F	A	Pts
1	Lancashire	5	5	0	0	177	36	10
2	Yorkshire	5	4	0	1	65	51	8
3	Northumberland	5	3	0	2	63	73	6
4	Durham	5	1	0	4	45	90	2
5	Cumberland & Westmorland	5	1	0	4	37	87	2
6	Cheshire	5	1	0	4	26	76	2

Pos	Midland Division	P	W	D	L	F	A	Pts
1	Warwickshire	5	5	0	0	100	47	10
2	North Midlands	5	3	0	2	109	61	6
3	Notts, Lincs & Derby	5	3	0	2	70	74	6
4	Leicestershire	5	2	0	3	81	72	4
5	Staffordshire	5	2	0	3	62	84	4
6	East Midlands	5	0	0	5	36	120	0

Pos	London Group A	P	W	D	L	F	A	Pts
1	Middlesex	2	1	0	1	42	32	2
2	Hertfordshire	2	1	0	1	32	36	2
3	Eastern Counties	2	1	0	1	25	31	2

Pos	London Group B	P	W	D	L	F	A	Pts
1	Surrey	3	3	0	0	70	25	6
2	Kent	3	2	0	1	53	42	4
3	Hampshire	3	1	0	2	31	51	2
4	Sussex	3	0	0	3	20	56	0

Pos	South-West Division	P	W	D	L	F	A	Pts
1	Gloucestershire	3	3	0	0	79	18	6
2	Somerset	3	2	0	1	36	38	4
3	Devon	3	1	0	2	38	57	2
4	Cornwall	3	0	0	3	3	43	0

Pos	Southern Division	P	W	D	L	F	A	Pts
1	Oxfordshire	3	3	0	0	47	16	6
2	Buckinghamshire	3	1	0	2	38	47	2
3	Berkshire	3	1	0	2	31	42	2
4	Dorset & Wilts	3	1	0	2	36	47	2

== Second Round ==
Venue	Team One	Team Two	Score
Kingsholm	Gloucestershire	Oxfordshire	37-12
Richmond	Middlesex	Surrey	29-6

== Semi finals ==
Venue	Team One	Team Two	Score
Vale of Lune	Lancashire	Gloucestershire	19-15
Richmond	Middlesex	Warwickshire	10-0

== Final ==
26 February 1977

Lancashire	17–6	Middlesex
Try: Lyon, Briers, Bond; Con: Gullick; Pen: Gullick		Try: Lawson; Con: Croydon

St Anthony's Road, Blundellsands
Referee: K Pattinson (North Midlands)
replaced by M Fisk (Yorkshire) 65 mins

Dave Gullick	Orrell
Rob Briers	West Park
Eric Lyon	Orrell
Tony Bond	Broughton Park
Mike Slemen	Liverpool
John Horton	Bath
David Carfoot	Waterloo
Laurie Connor	Waterloo
Tony Neary	Broughton Park
Bill Beaumont	Fylde
Richard Trickey	Sale
Roger Creed (capt)	Sale
Fran Cotton	Sale
Colin Fisher	Waterloo
Frank Blackhurst	Waterloo

Geoffrey Richards	Wasps
Colin Lambert	Harlequins
Alan Friell (capt)	London Scottish
David Croydon	Saracens
S Tiddy	Rosslyn Park
Ron Wilson	London Scottish
Alan Lawson	London Scottish
Bob Mordell	Rosslyn Park
Andy Ripley	Rosslyn Park
Chris Howcroft	London Welsh
Chris Ralston	Richmond
Adrian Alexander	Harlequins
Clint McGregor	Saracens
G G Bignell	Wasps
Les Barlow	Rosslyn Park

== See also ==
- English rugby union system
- Rugby union in England
