= 2016 County Championship Shield =

- Countries: England
- Date: 30 April 2016 - 29 May 2016
- Champions: Hampshire (2nd title)
- Runners-up: Staffordshire

The 2016 County Championship Shield was the 12th version of the annual English rugby union County Championship, organised by the RFU for the tier 3 English counties. Each county drew its players from rugby union clubs from the fifth tier and below of the English rugby union league system. The counties were divided into three pools - one pool with four teams, the others with three teams each, with the winner of each group plus the best runner-up going through to the semi-finals, and the winners of those games meeting in the final held at Twickenham Stadium. Due to competition changes for the 2017 season (more on this below) a number of teams in the division would be promoted to tier 2 for the following season, joining the 2015 Shield champions Leicestershire who had already been promoted at the start of this season.

After winning their respective pools and semi-final games, Staffordshire and Hampshire met in the final. In the end it was Hampshire who finished as the champions, defeating Staffordshire, 33–11.

== Competition format ==
The competition format consisted of three groups (one with four teams, two with three teams), based roughly on regional lines where possible. The four team group consisted of six games, with two teams playing two home games and the others one home game each, while the three team groups saw each team play one home game. The top side of each group automatically qualified for the semi-finals, as did the best group runner-up. The winners of the semi-finals met in the final at Twickenham Stadium held on 29 May 2016. Due to changes to the County Championship format for the 2017 competition, four teams from the division would end up being promoted to the tier 2 for the following season, based on performances in the Shield over the past couple of seasons.

== Participating counties and ground locations ==
Locations of the 2016 County Championship Shield county teams

County	Stadium(s)	Capacity	City/Area
Berkshire	Holme Park	N/A	Sonning, Reading, Berkshire
Buckinghamshire	Ostler's Field	N/A	Aylesbury, Buckinghamshire
Cumbria	Bower Park	N/A	Aspatria, Cumbria
Dorset & Wilts	Ballard's Ash Sports Ground	N/A	Wootton Bassett, Wiltshire
Essex	Memorial Park; The New Wilderness	N/A; N/A	Newham, Greater London; Redbridge, Greater London
Hampshire	Gosport Park	N/A	Gosport, Hampshire
Notts, Lincs & Derbyshire	Eakring Road	1,000	Mansfield, Nottinghamshire
Oxfordshire	Bodicote Park	2,500 (250 seats)	Banbury, Oxfordshire
Staffordshire	Esterchem Park	N/A	Leek, Staffordshire
Warwickshire	Webb Ellis Road	4,000 (200 seats)	Rugby, Warwickshire

== Group stage ==
=== Pool 1 ===
2016 County Championship Shield Pool 1 Table
	County	Played	Won	Drawn	Lost	Points For	Points Against	Points Difference	Try Bonus	Losing Bonus	Points
1	Buckinghamshire (Q)	3	2	1	0	99	72	27	2	0	12
2	Warwickshire (Q)	3	2	1	0	89	81	8	2	0	12
3	Essex	3	1	0	2	71	75	-4	1	1	6
4	Oxfordshire	3	0	0	3	78	109	-31	1	1	2
If teams were level at any stage, tiebreakers were applied in the following order: 1. Number of matches won 2. Difference between points for and against 3. Total number of points for 4. Aggregate number of points scored in matches between tied teams 5. Number of matches won excluding the first match, then the second and so on until the tie is settled
Green background means the county qualified for the Shield semi finals. Updated: 14 May 2016; Source: "County Championships". englandrugby.com.

==== Round 1 ====
15:00

(BP) Warwickshire	27 - 21	Oxfordshire (BP)
	Report

Webb Ellis Road, Rugby

15:00

Buckinghamshire	20 - 8	Essex
	Report

Ostler's Field, Aylesbury

==== Round 2 ====
7 May 2016
15:00

(BP) Essex	22 - 24	Warwickshire
	Report

Memorial Park, Newham, Greater London

7 May 2016
15:00

Oxfordshire	26 - 41	Buckinghamshire (BP)

Bodicote Park, Banbury

==== Round 3 ====
14 May 2016
15:00

(BP) Essex	41 - 31	Oxfordshire (BP)

The New Wilderness, Waltham Forest, Greater London

14 May 2016
15:00

(BP) Warwickshire	38 - 38	Buckinghamshire (BP)

Webb Ellis Road, Rugby

=== Pool 2 ===
2016 County Championship Shield Pool 2 Table
	County	Played	Won	Drawn	Lost	Points For	Points Against	Points Difference	Try Bonus	Losing Bonus	Points
1	Staffordshire (Q)	2	2	0	0	68	51	17	1	0	9
2	Notts, Lincs & Derbyshire	2	1	0	1	52	50	2	1	0	5
3	Cumbria	2	0	0	2	63	83	-20	2	0	2
If teams were level at any stage, tiebreakers were applied in the following order: 1. Number of matches won 2. Difference between points for and against 3. Total number of points for 4. Aggregate number of points scored in matches between tied teams 5. Number of matches won excluding the first match, then the second and so on until the tie is settled
Green background means the county qualified for the Shield semi finals. Updated: 14 May 2016; Source: "County Championships". englandrugby.com.

==== Round 1 ====
30 April 2016

Staffordshire	23 - 15	Notts, Lincs & Derbyshire
	Report

Esterchem Park, Leek

==== Round 2 ====
7 May 2016
15:00

(BP) Notts, Lincs & Derbyshire	37 - 27	Cumbria (BP)

Eakring Road, Mansfield

==== Round 3 ====
14 May 2016
15:00

(BP) Cumbria	36 - 45	Staffordshire (BP)

Bower Park, Aspatria

=== Pool 3 ===
2016 County Championship Shield Pool 3 Table
	County	Played	Won	Drawn	Lost	Points For	Points Against	Points Difference	Try Bonus	Losing Bonus	Points
1	Hampshire (Q)	2	2	0	0	90	13	77	2	0	10
2	Berkshire	2	1	0	1	35	60	-25	1	0	5
2	Dorset & Wilts	2	0	0	2	27	79	-52	0	0	0
If teams were level at any stage, tiebreakers were applied in the following order: 1. Number of matches won 2. Difference between points for and against 3. Total number of points for 4. Aggregate number of points scored in matches between tied teams 5. Number of matches won excluding the first match, then the second and so on until the tie is settled
Green background means the county qualified for the Shield semi finals. Updated: 14 May 2016; Source: "County Championships". englandrugby.com.

==== Round 1 ====
30 April 2016
15:00

(BP) Hampshire	44 - 13	Dorset & Wilts
	Report

Gosport Park, Gosport

==== Round 2 ====
7 May 2016
13:00

Berkshire	0 - 46	Hampshire (BP)

Holme Park, Reading

==== Round 3 ====
14 May 2016
15:00

Dorset & Wilts	14 - 35	Berkshire (BP)

Ballard’s Ash Sports Ground, Wootton Bassett

== Knock-out Stage ==
=== Semi-finals ===
21 May 2016
15:00

Warwickshire	15 - 23	Hampshire

Webb Ellis Road, Rugby

21 May 2016
15:00

Staffordshire	6 - 3	Buckinghamshire

Esterchem Park, Leek

=== Final ===
29 May 2016

Hampshire	33 - 11	Staffordshire

Twickenham Stadium, Twickenham, Greater London

== See also ==
- English rugby union system
- Rugby union in England
