= 2017 Bill Beaumont County Championship Division 3 =

- Countries: England
- Date: 6 May 2017 - 28 May 2017
- Champions: Oxfordshire (1st title)
- Runners-up: Sussex
- Matches played: 9
- Tries scored: 51 (average 5.7 per match)
- Top point scorer: (Spain) Carles Casanova (Sussex) (England) Ed Phillips (Oxfordshire); 23 points
- Top try scorer: (England) Bradley Burr (Essex); 3 tries

The 2017 Bill Beaumont County Championship Division 3 was the 13th version of the annual English rugby union County Championship, organised by the RFU for the tier 3 English counties. This was the first season it would be officially known as Bill Beaumont Division 3, having previously been known as the County Championship Shield. Each county drew its players from rugby union clubs from the fifth tier and below of the English rugby union league system. Due to changes to the competition across the board, the Division 3 competition was reduced to eight teams (see the section below for more detail on this), divided into two pools (north and south) with the pool winners meeting in the final to be held at Twickenham Stadium. New teams to the division include Middlesex, who returned to Division 3 after missing the previous year, and Sussex who last took part in 2013. The reigning champions, Hampshire, were one of the promoted counties who were playing in tier 2 in 2017.

At the end of the pool stage Oxfordshire and Sussex topped both of their groups to qualify for the final. This was not without some controversy as Oxfordshire managed to make the final despite only playing 2 of their 3 group games. With pool 1 on a knife edge going into the final game, Oxfordshire's opponents, Notts, Lincs & Derbyshire, were unable to field a front row and the game was awarded to Oxfordshire and 5 points. By gaining the extra bonus point, Oxfordshire edged out group rivals, Buckinghamshire and Essex, who both had a superior for and against records. Having said all this had Notts, Lincs & Derbyshire played it was probably likely that Oxfordshire would have won by a bonus point anyway. At the Twickenham final an exciting game finished 29-29 after 80 minutes, with Oxfordshire crowned Division 3 champions for the first time in the county's history by virtue of scoring more tries (5) than Sussex (4).

== Competition format ==
The Division 3 format was changed for the 2017 season. Where before there were ten teams playing in three pools, this was narrowed down to seven teams playing in two pools. The first pool had four teams with two of the counties playing two home games and the others just one - the RFU plans to switch this around the following year so that teams that played one home game in 2017 will get two during the 2018 competition. Pool 2 only had three teams due to the withdrawal of Middlesex who were supposed to take part, meaning that each team played one home game each. The top side in each group went through to the final held at Twickenham Stadium.

Due to changes to the County Championships implemented for this competition, promotion between tier 3 and tier 2 has been introduced. This will be done over a two-year period, with points accumulated from the pool stages determining the promoted sides (one for each group), who will be turn replaced by the bottom two sides (one from each group) from tier 2.

== Participating counties and ground locations ==
County	Stadium(s)	Capacity	City/Area
Berkshire	Holme Park	N/A	Reading, Berkshire
Buckinghamshire	Brook End	N/A	Aylesbury, Buckinghamshire
Dorset & Wilts	Ballard's Ash Sports Ground	5,000	Wootton Bassett, Wiltshire
Essex	Memorial Park	N/A	Newham, Greater London
Notts, Lincs & Derbyshire	Eakring Road	1,000	Mansfield, Nottinghamshire
Oxfordshire	Dry Leas; Kingsey Road	4,000; 2,500	Henley-on-Thames, Oxfordshire; Thame, Oxfordshire
Sussex	Willoughby Fields	N/A	Crawley, West Sussex

Locations of the 2017 Division 3 county teams

== Group stage ==
=== Division 3 Pool 1 ===
2017 Bill Beaumont Division 3 Pool 1 Table
	County	Played	Won	Drawn	Lost	Points For	Points Against	Points Difference	Try Bonus	Losing Bonus	Points
1	Oxfordshire (Q)	3	2	0	1	61	55	6	2	1	12 (Note: Oxfordshire awarded 5 point home win against Notts, Lincs & Derbyshire who failed to show up for the final group game on 20 May 2017.)
2	Essex	3	2	0	1	84	59	25	2	1	11
3	Buckinghamshire	3	2	0	1	77	59	18	2	1	11
4	Notts, Lincs & Derbyshire	3	0	0	3	18	67	-49	0	0	0
If teams are level at any stage, tiebreakers are applied in the following order: 1. Number of matches won 2. Difference between points for and against 3. Total number of points for 4. Aggregate number of points scored in matches between tied teams 5. Number of matches won excluding the first match, then the second and so on until the tie is settled
Green background means the county qualified for the final. Updated: 20 May 2017; Source: "County Championships". englandrugby.com.

==== Round 1 ====
6 May 2017
15:00

(2BP) Buckinghamshire	25 - 32	Oxfordshire (BP)
	Report

Brook End, Aylesbury

6 May 2017
15:00

Notts, Lincs & Derbyshire	8 - 37	Essex (BP)
	Report

Eakring Road, Mansfield

==== Round 2 ====
13 May 2017
15:00

(BP) Buckinghamshire	30 - 10	Notts, Lincs & Derbyshire

Brook End, Aylesbury

13 May 2017
15:00

(2BP) Oxfordshire	29 - 30	Essex (BP)

Dry Leas, Henley-on-Thames

==== Round 3 ====
20 May 2017
15:00

(BP) Essex	17 - 22	Buckinghamshire

Memorial Park, Newham, Greater London

20 May 2017
15:00

Oxfordshire	HWO	Notts, Lincs & Derbyshire

Kingsey Road, Thame

- Oxfordshire awarded 5 point win by default as Notts, Lincs & Derbyshire were unable to field a team due to a lack of front-row forwards.

=== Division 3 Pool 2 ===
2017 Bill Beaumont Division 3 Pool 2 Table
	County	Played	Won	Drawn	Lost	Points For	Points Against	Points Difference	Try Bonus	Losing Bonus	Points
1	Sussex (Q)	2	2	0	0	47	23	24	1	0	9
2	Berkshire	2	1	0	1	43	37	6	0	1	5
3	Dorset & Wilts	2	0	0	2	28	58	-30	0	0	0
If teams are level at any stage, tiebreakers are applied in the following order: 1. Number of matches won 2. Difference between points for and against 3. Total number of points for 4. Aggregate number of points scored in matches between tied teams 5. Number of matches won excluding the first match, then the second and so on until the tie is settled
Green background means the county qualified for the final. Updated: 20 May 2017; Source: "County Championships". englandrugby.com.

==== Round 1 ====
6 May 2017
15:00

(BP) Sussex	28 - 10	Dorset & Wilts
	Report

Willoughby Fields, Crawley

==== Round 2 ====
13 May 2017
14:00

(BP) Berkshire	13 - 19	Sussex

Holme Park, Reading

==== Round 3 ====
20 May 2017
14:30

Dorset & Wilts	18 - 30	Berkshire

Ballard’s Ash Sports Ground, Wootton Bassett

== Final ==
28 May 2017
10:00

Oxfordshire	29-29	Sussex
	Report

Twickenham Stadium, London

- Oxfordshire champions by virtue of scoring more tries (5) than Sussex (4).

== Individual statistics ==
- Note that points scorers includes tries as well as conversions, penalties and drop goals. Appearance figures also include coming on as substitutes (unused substitutes not included). Statistics will also include final.

=== Top points scorers ===
Rank	Player	County	Club Side	Appearances	Points
1	(Spain) Carlos Casanova	Sussex	Hove	3	23
1	(England) Ed Phillips	Oxfordshire	Banbury	3	23
2	(England) Alex Shearer	Buckinghamshire	Aylesbury	3	22
3	(England) Henry Bird	Essex	Brentwood	2 (Note: Henry Bird may have also played in Essex's 17-22 loss to Buckinghamshire but press coverage is very poor so it not certain if he played in this game.)	20
4	(England) Bradley Burr	Essex	Southend Saxons	2	17

=== Top try scorers ===
Rank	Player	County	Club Side	Appearances	Tries
1	(England) Bradley Burr	Essex	Southend Saxons	2	3
2	(England) Marcus Bloomberg	Essex	Southend Saxons	2 (Note: Marcus Bloomberg may have also played in Essex's 37-8 win over Notts, Lincs & Derbyshire but press coverage is very poor so it not certain if he played in this game.)	2
2	(England) Ed Bowden	Sussex	Alleynian	2 (Note: Ed Bowden may have also played in Sussex's 19-13 win over Berkshire but press coverage is very poor so it not certain if he played in this game.)	2
2	(England) Paul Bradley	Essex	Romford & Gidea	3	2
2	(England) Max Morris	Sussex	Brighton	2 (Note: Max Morris may have also played in Sussex's 19-13 win over Berkshire but press coverage is very poor so it not certain if he played in this game.)	2
2	(England) Pat Ockendon	Buckinghamshire	Buckingham	3	2
2	(England) Tom Simpson	Essex	Brentwood	2 (Note: Tom Simpson may have also played in Essex's 17-22 Loss to Buckinghamshire but press coverage is very poor so it not certain if he played in this game.)	2
2	(England) Ed Yeats	Oxfordshire	Oxford Harlequins	3	2

== Competition records ==
=== Team ===
Largest home win — 20 points

30 - 10 Buckinghamshire at home to Notts, Lincs and Derbyshire on 13 May 2017

Largest away win — 29 points

37 - 8 Essex away to Notts, Lincs and Derbyshire on 6 May 2017

Most points scored — 37 points

37 - 8 Essex away to Notts, Lincs and Derbyshire on 6 May 2017

Most tries in a match — 5 (x2)

Essex away to Notts, Lincs and Derbyshire on 6 May 2017
Oxfordshire at Twickenham against Sussex on 28 May 2017

Most conversions in a match — 4

Sussex at home to Dorset & Wilts on 6 May 2017

Most penalties in a match — 3 (x2)

Sussex away to Berkshire on 13 May 2017
Berkshire away to Dorset & Wilts on 20 May 2017

Most drop goals in a match — 0

Most points in a match — 17

(England) Ed Phillips for Oxfordshire away to Buckinghamshire on 6 May 2017

Most tries in a match — 2 (x2)

(England) Pat Ockendon for Buckinghamshire at home to Notts, Lincs & Derbyshire on 13 May 2017
(England) Bradley Burr for Essex at home to Buckinghamshire on 20 May 2017

Most conversions in a match — 4

(Spain) Carlos Casanova for Sussex at home to Dorset & Wilts on 6 May 2017

Most penalties in a match — 3 (x2)

(Spain) Carlos Casanova for Sussex away to Berkshire on 13 May 2017
(England) Tom Finnie for Berkshire away to Dorset & Wilts on 20 May 2017

== See also ==
- English rugby union system
- Rugby union in England
