= 2014 County Championship Shield =

Rugby competition

- Countries: England
- Date: 3 May 2014 – 1 June 2015
- Champions: Surrey (4th title)
- Runners-up: Leicestershire

The 2014 County Championship Shield was the 10th version of the annual English rugby union County Championship, organized by the RFU for the tier 3 English counties. Each county drew its players from rugby union clubs from the fifth tier and below of the English rugby union league system. The counties were divided into three pools of four teams each, based roughly on regional lines, with the winner of each group plus the best runner-up going through to the semi-finals, with the winners of those games meeting in the final held at Twickenham Stadium. Typically there is no promotion or relegation out of or into the County Championship Shield, although Surrey's dominance over the past couple of competitions meant that they had a chance of being invited to take part in tier 2 the following season. The competition would also welcome Staffordshire, who did not play in the county championship last year, replacing Sussex. Surrey were the reigning champions.

After winning their respective groups and semi final games, Surrey faced Leicestershire in the final at Twickenham, in what would be Surrey's third consecutive Shield final. Having won the previous two finals, Surrey made it a hat trick (and fourth Shield title overall) as they defeated Leicestershire 39–16. This would also be Surrey's last season in the third tier as their performances would see them promoted to the 2015 County Championship Plate.

== Competition format ==
The competition format consisted of four pools (one of four teams, the others with three), based roughly on regional lines where possible, with each team playing each other once. The top side of each group qualified for the semi-finals, with the winners of the semi-finals playing in the final held at Twickenham Stadium on 1 June 2014. As the lowest tier in the county championship there is no relegation while promotion is not given every season, although outstanding county performances (such as Surrey's) can lead to counties moving up to tier 2.

== Participating counties and ground locations ==
Locations of the 2014 County Championship Shield county teams

County	Stadium(s)	Capacity	City/Area
Berkshire	Monk's Lane	8,000	Newbury, Berkshire
Buckinghamshire	Weedon Lane	N/A	Amersham, Buckinghamshire
Cumbria	Ellis Sports Ground; Bower Park	12,000 (2,000 seats); N/A	Workington, Cumbria; Aspatria, Cumbria
Dorset & Wilts	Ballard's Ash Sports Ground	N/A	Wootton Bassett, Wiltshire
Essex	Forest Road	N/A	Ilford, Greater London
Hampshire	Rugby Camp	N/A	Portsmouth, Hampshire
Leicestershire	Vipers Rugby Ground; Leicester Road	N/A; N/A	Whetstone, Leicestershire; Hinckley, Leicestershire
Middlesex	The Reeves	N/A	Feltham, Greater London
Notts, Lincs & Derbyshire	Sleaford Road	N/A	Sleaford, Lincolnshire
Oxfordshire	Witney Road; Cane Lane	N/A; N/A	Hailey, Witney, Oxfordshire; Grove, Oxfordshire
Staffordshire	Peel Croft	5,500	Burton upon Trent, Staffordshire
Surrey	Frant Road	1,400 (400 seats)	Croydon, Greater London
Warwickshire	Liberty Way; Ivor Preece Field	4,314; 1,500 (250 seats)	Nuneaton, Warwickshire; Binley Woods, Coventry, Warwickshire

== Group stage ==
=== Pool 1 ===
2014 County Championship Shield Pool 1 Table
	County	Played	Won	Drawn	Lost	Points For	Points Against	Points Difference	Try Bonus	Losing Bonus	Points
1	Leicestershire (Q)	3	2	0	1	85	69	16	2	1	11
2	Essex	3	2	0	1	51	62	-11	0	0	8
3	Warwickshire	3	2	0	1	120	51	69	3	0	7
4	Buckinghamshire	3	0	0	3	32	106	-74	0	0	0
If teams are level at any stage, tiebreakers are applied in the following order: 1. Number of matches won 2. Difference between points for and against 3. Total number of points for 4. Aggregate number of points scored in matches between tied teams 5. Number of matches won excluding the first match, then the second and so on until the tie is settled
Green background means the county qualified for the Shield semi finals. Updated: 17 May 2014; Source: "County Championships". englandrugby.com.

==== Round 1 ====
3 May 2014
15:00

(BP) Leicestershire	19 - 22	Essex

Vipers Rugby Ground, Whetstone

3 May 2014
15:00

(BP) Warwickshire	52 - 10	Buckinghamshire
	Report

Liberty Way, Nuneaton

==== Round 2 ====
10 May 2014
14:30

Buckinghamshire	17 - 25	Leicestershire (BP)

Weedon Lane, Amersham

10 May 2014
15:00

(BP) Warwickshire	38 - 0	Essex
	Report

The Ivor Preece Field, Binley Woods

==== Round 3 ====
17 May 2014
15:00

Essex	29 - 5	Buckinghamshire

Forest Road, Ilford

17 May 2014
15:00

(BP) Leicestershire	41 - 30	Warwickshire (BP)
	Report

Leicester Road, Hinckley

=== Pool 2 ===
2014 County Championship Shield Pool 2 Table
	County	Played	Won	Drawn	Lost	Points For	Points Against	Points Difference	Try Bonus	Losing Bonus	Points
1	Cumbria (Q)	2	2	0	0	58	19	39	1	0	9
2	Notts, Lincs & Derbyshire	2	1	0	1	29	55	-26	0	0	4
3	Staffordshire	2	0	0	2	27	40	-13	0	2	2
If teams are level at any stage, tiebreakers are applied in the following order: 1. Number of matches won 2. Difference between points for and against 3. Total number of points for 4. Aggregate number of points scored in matches between tied teams 5. Number of matches won excluding the first match, then the second and so on until the tie is settled
Green background means the county qualified for the Shield semi finals. Updated: 17 May 2014; Source: "County Championships". englandrugby.com.

==== Round 1 ====
3 May 2014
15:00

Cumbria	18 - 12	Staffordshire (BP)
	Report

Ellis Sports Ground, Workington

==== Round 2 ====
10 May 2014
15:00

Notts, Lincs & Derbyshire	7 - 40	Cumbria (BP)
	Report

Sleaford Road, Sleaford

==== Round 3 ====
17 May 2014
15:00

(BP) Staffordshire	15 - 22	Notts, Lincs & Derbyshire

Peel Croft, Burton upon Trent

=== Pool 3 ===
2014 County Championship Shield Pool 3 Table
	County	Played	Won	Drawn	Lost	Points For	Points Against	Points Difference	Try Bonus	Losing Bonus	Points
1	Oxfordshire (Q)	2	2	0	0	66	45	21	2	0	10
2	Berkshire	2	1	0	1	56	55	1	1	0	5
3	Dorset & Wilts	2	0	0	2	44	66	-22	0	1	1
If teams are level at any stage, tiebreakers are applied in the following order: 1. Number of matches won 2. Difference between points for and against 3. Total number of points for 4. Aggregate number of points scored in matches between tied teams 5. Number of matches won excluding the first match, then the second and so on until the tie is settled
Green background means the county qualified for the Shield semi finals. Updated: 17 May 2014; Source: "County Championships". englandrugby.com.

==== Round 1 ====
3 May 2014
15:00

Dorset & Wilts	18 - 37	Berkshire (BP)
	Report

Ballard's Ash Sports Ground, Wootton Bassett

==== Round 2 ====
10 May 2014
15:00

Berkshire	19 - 37	Oxfordshire (BP)
	Report

Monk's Lane, Newbury

==== Round 3 ====
17 May 2014
15:00

(BP) Oxfordshire	29 - 26	Dorset & Wilts (BP)
	Report

Witney Road, Witney

=== Pool 4 ===
2014 County Championship Shield Pool 4 Table
	County	Played	Won	Drawn	Lost	Points For	Points Against	Points Difference	Try Bonus	Losing Bonus	Points
1	Surrey (Q)	2	2	0	0	81	10	71	2	0	10
2	Middlesex	2	1	0	1	49	82	-33	1	0	5
3	Hampshire	2	0	0	2	42	80	-38	1	0	1
If teams are level at any stage, tiebreakers are applied in the following order: 1. Number of matches won 2. Difference between points for and against 3. Total number of points for 4. Aggregate number of points scored in matches between tied teams 5. Number of matches won excluding the first match, then the second and so on until the tie is settled
Green background means the county qualified for the Shield semi finals. Updated: 17 May 2014; Source: "County Championships". englandrugby.com.

==== Round 1 ====
3 May 2014
15:00

(BP) Middlesex	46 - 35	Hampshire (BP)

The Reeves, Feltham

==== Round 2 ====
10 May 2014
15:00

(BP) Surrey	47 - 3	Middlesex
	Report

Frant Road, Croydon

==== Round 3 ====
17 May 2014
15:00

Hampshire	7 - 34	Surrey

Rugby Camp, Portsmouth

== Knock-out Stage ==
=== Semi-finals ===
24 May 2014
15:00

Cumbria	18 - 23	Leicestershire
	Report

Bower Park, Aspatria
Attendance: 250
Referee: Mike Harris

24 May 2014
15:00

Oxfordshire	12 - 52	Surrey
	Report

Cane Lane, Grove
Attendance: 250
Referee: Claire Hodnett

=== Final ===
1 June 2014
17:00

Leicestershire	16 - 39	Surrey
	Report

Twickenham, London

== See also ==
- English rugby union system
- Rugby union in England
