= 2013 County Championship Shield =

- Countries: England
- Date: 27 April 2013 - 26 May 2013
- Champions: Surrey (3rd title)
- Runners-up: Cumbria

The 2013 County Championship Shield was the 9th version of the annual English rugby union County Championship, organized by the RFU for the tier 3 English counties. Each county drew its players from rugby union clubs from the fifth tier and below of the English rugby union league system. The counties were divided into three pools of four teams each, based roughly on regional lines, with the winner of each group plus the best runner-up going through to the semi-finals, with the winners of those games meeting in the final held at Twickenham Stadium. Typically there is no promotion or relegation out of or into the County Championship Shield. Surrey were the reigning champions.

After winning their pools and semi-final matches, reigning champions Surrey met Cumbria in the final. Having thrashed Leicestershire the last time round, Surrey found Cumbria a much tougher prospect, eventually prevailing 23 – 16 to claim their second successive title (and third overall).

== Competition format ==
The competition format consisted of four pools (one of four teams, the others with three), based roughly on regional lines where possible, with each team playing each other once. The top side of each group qualified for the semi-finals, with the winners of the semi-finals playing in the final held at Twickenham Stadium on 26 May 2013. As the lowest tier in the county championship there is no relegation while promotion is not given every season, although outstanding county performances can lead to counties moving up to tier 2.

== Participating counties and ground locations ==
Locations of the 2013 County Championship Shield county teams

| County | Stadium(s) | Capacity | City/Area |
|---|---|---|---|
| Berkshire | Monk's Lane | 8,000 | Newbury, Berkshire |
| Buckinghamshire | Kingsmead Road | N/A | High Wycombe, Buckinghamshire |
| Cumbria | Winters Park; Lowmoor Road; Bower Park | N/A; N/A; N/A | Penrith, Cumbria; Wigton, Cumbria; Aspatria, Cumbria |
| Dorset & Wilts | Allington Fields; Bestwall Park | 500; N/A | Chippenham, Wiltshire; Wareham, Dorset |
| Essex | Forest Road | N/A | Ilford, Greater London |
| Hampshire | Rugby Camp | N/A | Portsmouth, Hampshire |
| Leicestershire (Note: Leicestershire did not play any home games during this year's Shield competition.) | N/A | N/A | N/A |
| Middlesex | Athletic Ground | 4,500 (1,000 seats) | Richmond, London |
| Notts, Lincs & Derbyshire | The Rugby Ground | 1,000 (60 seats) | Newark-on-Trent, Nottinghamshire |
| Oxfordshire | Marston Ferry Road | N/A | Oxford, Oxfordshire |
| Surrey | Broadwater Sports Club | N/A | Farncombe, Surrey |
| Sussex | Pulborough Road; Roundstone Lane | N/A; 1,500 (100 seats) | Pulborough, West Sussex; Angmering, West Sussex |
| Warwickshire | Butts Park Arena | 4,000 | Coventry, West Midlands |

== Group stage ==
=== Pool 1 ===
2013 County Championship Shield Pool 1 Table
| | County | Played | Won | Drawn | Lost | Points For | Points Against | Points Difference | Try Bonus | Losing Bonus | Points |
| 1 | Cumbria (Q) | 2 | 2 | 0 | 0 | 109 | 17 | 92 | 2 | 0 | 10 |
| 2 | Leicestershire | 2 | 1 | 0 | 1 | 98 | 41 | 57 | 1 | 0 | 5 |
| 3 | Notts, Lincs & Derbyshire | 2 | 0 | 0 | 2 | 3 | 152 | -149 | 0 | 0 | 0 |
If teams are level at any stage, tiebreakers are applied in the following order: 1. Number of matches won 2. Difference between points for and against 3. Total number of points for 4. Aggregate number of points scored in matches between tied teams 5. Number of matches won excluding the first match, then the second and so on until the tie is settled
Green background means the county qualified for the Shield semi finals. Updated: 11 May 2013; Source: "County Championships". englandrugby.com.

==== Round 1 ====
27 April 2013

| Notts, Lincs & Derbyshire | 3 - 81 | Leicestershire (BP) |
| | Report |

Kelham Road, Newark-on-Trent

==== Round 2 ====
4 May 2013
15:00

| (BP) Cumbria | 71 - 0 | Notts, Lincs & Derbyshire |
| | Report |

Lowmoor Road, Wigton

==== Round 3 ====
11 May 2013
15:00

| Cumbria (BP) | 38 - 17 | Leicestershire |
| | Report |

Winters Park, Penrith

=== Pool 2 ===
2013 County Championship Shield Pool 2 Table
| | County | Played | Won | Drawn | Lost | Points For | Points Against | Points Difference | Try Bonus | Losing Bonus | Points |
| 1 | Warwickshire (Q) | 2 | 2 | 0 | 0 | 66 | 32 | 34 | 1 | 0 | 9 |
| 2 | Essex | 2 | 1 | 0 | 1 | 52 | 37 | 15 | 1 | 1 | 6 |
| 3 | Buckinghamshire | 2 | 0 | 0 | 2 | 24 | 73 | -49 | 0 | 0 | 0 |
If teams are level at any stage, tiebreakers are applied in the following order: 1. Number of matches won 2. Difference between points for and against 3. Total number of points for 4. Aggregate number of points scored in matches between tied teams 5. Number of matches won excluding the first match, then the second and so on until the tie is settled
Green background means the county qualified for the Shield semi finals. Updated: 11 May 2014; Source: "County Championships". englandrugby.com.

==== Round 1 ====
27 April 2013

| Buckinghamshire | 12 - 41 | Warwickshire (BP) |
| | Report |

Kingsmead Road, High Wycombe

==== Round 2 ====
4 May 2013
15:00

| Warwickshire | 25 - 20 | Essex (BP) |

Butts Park Arena, Coventry

==== Round 3 ====
11 May 2013

| (BP) Essex | 32 - 12 | Buckinghamshire |

Forest Road, Ilford

=== Pool 3 ===
2013 County Championship Shield Pool 3 Table
| | County | Played | Won | Drawn | Lost | Points For | Points Against | Points Difference | Try Bonus | Losing Bonus | Points |
| 1 | Surrey (Q) | 3 | 3 | 0 | 0 | 157 | 60 | 97 | 3 | 0 | 15 |
| 2 | Dorset & Wilts | 3 | 2 | 0 | 1 | 93 | 72 | 21 | 2 | 0 | 10 |
| 3 | Oxfordshire | 3 | 1 | 0 | 2 | 76 | 135 | -59 | 1 | 0 | 5 |
| 4 | Berkshire | 3 | 0 | 0 | 3 | 63 | 122 | -59 | 1 | 1 | 2 |
If teams are level at any stage, tiebreakers are applied in the following order: 1. Number of matches won 2. Difference between points for and against 3. Total number of points for 4. Aggregate number of points scored in matches between tied teams 5. Number of matches won excluding the first match, then the second and so on until the tie is settled
Green background means the county qualified for the Shield semi finals. Updated: 11 May 2013; Source: "County Championships". englandrugby.com.

==== Round 1 ====
27 April 2013

| (BP) Berkshire | 17 - 23 | Dorset & Wilts (BP) |

Monk's Lane, Newbury

27 April 2013

| (BP) Surrey | 67 - 12 | Oxfordshire |
| | Report |

Broadwater Sports Club, Farncombe

==== Round 2 ====
4 May 2014

| (BP) Berkshire | 36 - 49 | Surrey (BP) |

Monk's Lane, Newbury

4 May 2014

| (BP) Dorset & Wilts | 58 - 14 | Oxfordshire |
| | Report |

Allington Fields, Chippenham

==== Round 3 ====
11 May 2013

| Dorset & Wilts | 12 - 41 | Surrey (BP) |
| | Report |

Bestwall Park, Wareham

11 May 2013

| (BP) Oxfordshire | 50 - 10 | Berkshire |

Marston Ferry Road, Oxford

=== Pool 4 ===
2013 County Championship Shield Pool 4 Table
| | County | Played | Won | Drawn | Lost | Points For | Points Against | Points Difference | Try Bonus | Losing Bonus | Points |
| 1 | Sussex (Q) | 2 | 2 | 0 | 0 | 55 | 50 | 5 | 2 | 0 | 10 |
| 2 | Hampshire | 2 | 1 | 0 | 1 | 64 | 45 | 19 | 1 | 1 | 6 |
| 3 | Middlesex | 2 | 0 | 0 | 2 | 46 | 70 | -24 | 1 | 1 | 2 |
If teams are level at any stage, tiebreakers are applied in the following order: 1. Number of matches won 2. Difference between points for and against 3. Total number of points for 4. Aggregate number of points scored in matches between tied teams 5. Number of matches won excluding the first match, then the second and so on until the tie is settled
Green background means the county qualified for the Shield semi finals. Updated: 11 May 2013; Source: "County Championships". englandrugby.com.

==== Round 1 ====
27 April 2013

| (BP) Hampshire | 41 - 19 | Middlesex |
| | Report |

Rugby Camp, Portsmouth

==== Round 2 ====
4 May 2013

| (BP) Sussex | 26 - 23 | Hampshire (BP) |

Pulborough Road, Pulborough

==== Round 3 ====
11 May 2013
14:00

| (2BP) Middlesex | 27 - 29 | Sussex (BP) |

Athletic Ground, Richmond

== Knock-out Stage ==
=== Semi-finals ===
18 May 2013
16:15

| Cumbria | 13 - 11 | Warwickshire |
| | Report |

Bower Park, Aspatria

18 May 2013

| Sussex | 8 - 35 | Surrey |

Roundstone Lane, Worthing

=== Final ===
26 May 2013
17:15

| Cumbria | 16 - 21 | Surrey |
| | Report |

Twickenham Stadium, London

== See also ==
- English rugby union system
- Rugby union in England
