= 2018 Bill Beaumont County Championship Division 2 =

- Countries: England
- Date: 5 May - 27 May 2018
- Champions: Durham County (1st title)
- Runners-up: Warwickshire
- Promoted: Durham County, Hampshire
- Relegated: Cumbria, North Midlands
- Top point scorer: (England) Joel Knight (Hampshire); 45 points
- Top try scorer: (England) Callum Dacey (Leicestershire) (England) Oliver Hodgson (Durham) (England) Sean Moloney (Durham); 5 tries

The 2018 Bill Beaumont County Championship Division 2, was the 17th version of the competition that is part of the annual English rugby union County Championship organised by the RFU for the tier 2 English counties. Each county drew its players from rugby union clubs from the third tier and below of the English rugby union league system (typically National League 1, National League 2 North or National League 2 South). The counties were divided into two regional pools (north/south) with four teams in each and the winners of each pool meeting in the final at Twickenham Stadium. Leicestershire were the reigning champions, having won the 2017 final.

At the end of the group stage, Durham County won the northern group with ease despite having another strong side, and 2017 winners, Leicestershire, in their pool. They were joined by southern winners Warwickshire who beat off stiff competition from Hampshire to qualify. At the Twickenham final, Durham showed that they were best side in the division by comfortably beating Warwickshire, 46-12, for what would be the county's first ever Division 2 victory and first county silverware since 2009.

By showing the best form over two years, Durham County were promoted from the northern group, just edging Leicestershire by virtue of a better for/against record, while Hampshire were promoted from the southern group despite missing out on the final. Both counties will play in the 2019 Bill Beaumont Cup. At the opposite end of the tables, Cumbria (north) and North Midlands (south) were relegated to the 2019 County Championship Shield. In the case of Cumbria they actually finished above Staffordshire on points/for against over the two years, but still went down for reasons that are not yet clear.

== Competition format ==
The competition format was two regional group stages divided into north and south with four teams in each group. This means that two teams in the pool had two home games, while the other two had just one. The RFU took fixtures from the previous year into account so that county sides that only played one home game in that competition now get two games and vice versa. At the end of the group stage the top teams with the best record from each group (north and south) advance to the final held on 27 May 2018 at Twickenham Stadium.

A continuation from the 2017 competition was that promotion/relegation occurred every two seasons instead of one, with points accumulated over the two seasons (2017 and 2018) taken into consideration. The two highest ranked counties (one from the north/one from the south) were promoted into the 2019 Bill Beaumont Cup competition, replacing the lowest ranked aggregate sides who dropped down into Division 2. Relegation was also introduced with the bottom two ranked sides (again one north/one south) over the two years dropping to the 2019 Bill Beaumont County Championship Division 3 and being replaced by the top two teams from the 2018 Bill Beaumont County Championship Division 3.

== Participating counties and ground locations ==
County	Stadium(s)	Capacity	City/Area
Cumbria	Lowmoor Road; Mint Bridge Stadium	N/A; 3,500 (258 seats)	Wigton, Cumbria; Kendal, Cumbria
Durham County	Hollow Drift; Greenwood Road	1,500 (500 seats); N/A	Durham, County Durham; Billingham, County Durham
Hampshire	Gosport Park	N/A	Gosport, Hampshire
Leicestershire	Westleigh Park	2,000	Blaby, Leicestershire
North Midlands	Finstall Park	N/A	Bromsgrove, Worcestershire
Somerset	Hyde Park	2,000 (198 seats)	Taunton, Somerset
Staffordshire	Peel Croft	5,500	Burton upon Trent, Staffordshire
Warwickshire	Liberty Way; Webb Ellis Road	4,314; 4,000 (200 seats)	Nuneaton, Warwickshire; Rugby, Warwickshire

Locations of the 2018 Division 2 county teams

== Group stage ==
=== Division 2 North ===
2018 Bill Beaumont Division 2 North Table
	County	Played	Won	Drawn	Lost	Points For	Points Against	Points Difference	Try Bonus	Losing Bonus	Points
1	Durham County (Q, P)	3	3	0	0	195	22	173	2	0	14
2	Leicestershire	3	2	0	1	106	68	38	2	0	10
3	Staffordshire	3	1	0	2	65	248	-183	1	1	6
4	Cumbria (R)	3	0	0	3	29	149	-120	0	1	1
If teams are level at any stage, tiebreakers are applied in the following order: 1. Number of matches won 2. Difference between points for and against 3. Total number of points for 4. Aggregate number of points scored in matches between tied teams 5. Number of matches won excluding the first match, then the second and so on until the tie is settled
Green background means the county qualified for the final. (P) means promoted. Updated: 19 May 2018; Source: "County Championships". englandrugby.com.

==== Round 1 ====
5 May 2018
15:00

Cumbria	5 - 64	Durham (BP)
	Cumbria; Durham

Lowmoor Road, Wigton

5 May 2018
15:00

(2BP) Staffordshire	29 - 33	Leicestershire (BP)

Peel Croft, Burton upon Trent

==== Round 2 ====
12 May 2018
14:30

(BP) Durham	99 – 7	Staffordshire
	Durham

Hollow Drift, Durham

12 May 2018
15:00

(BP) Leicestershire	63 – 7	Cumbria
	Leicestershire

Westleigh Park, Blaby

==== Round 3 ====
19 May 2018
14:30

Durham	32 – 10	Leicestershire
	Durham

Greenwood Road, Billingham

19 May 2018
15:00

(BP) Cumbria	17 – 22	Staffordshire

Mint Bridge Stadium, Kendal

=== Division 2 South ===
2018 Bill Beaumont Division 2 South Table
	County	Played	Won	Drawn	Lost	Points For	Points Against	Points Difference	Try Bonus	Losing Bonus	Points
1	Warwickshire (Q)	3	3	0	0	87	41	46	3	0	15
2	Hampshire (P)	3	2	0	1	146	71	75	2	1	11
3	Somerset	3	1	0	2	56	119	-63	1	0	5
4	North Midlands (R)	3	0	0	3	71	129	-58	2	0	2
If teams are level at any stage, tiebreakers are applied in the following order: 1. Number of matches won 2. Difference between points for and against 3. Total number of points for 4. Aggregate number of points scored in matches between tied teams 5. Number of matches won excluding the first match, then the second and so on until the tie is settled
Green background means the county qualified for the final. (P) means promoted. Updated: 19 May 2018; Source: "County Championships". englandrugby.com.

==== Round 1 ====
5 May 2018
15:00

(BP) Hampshire	56 - 35	North Midlands (BP)
	North Midlands; Hampshire

Gosport Park, Gosport

5 May 2018
15:00

(BP) Warwickshire	29 - 5	Somerset
	Warwickshire

Liberty Way, Nuneaton

==== Round 2 ====
12 May 2018
15:00

North Midlands	12 – 27	Warwickshire (BP)
	North Midlands; Warwickshire

Finstall Park, Bromsgrove

12 May 2018
15:00

Somerset	5 – 66	Hampshire (BP)
	Hampshire

Hyde Park, Taunton

==== Round 3 ====
19 May 2018
15:00

(BP) Somerset	46 – 24	North Midlands (BP)
	North Midlands

Hyde Park, Taunton

19 May 2018
15:00

(BP) Warwickshire	31 – 24	Hampshire (BP)
	Warwickshire; Hampshire

Ellis Road, Rugby

== Final ==
27 May 2018
17:15

Durham County	46 – 12	Warwickshire

Twickenham Stadium, London

== Promotion/relegation aggregate table ==
In order to determine promotion to the 2019 Bill Beaumont County Championship Division 1 and relegation to the 2019 Bill Beaumont County Championship Division 3, results from the 2017 and 2018 competitions will be combined, with the highest and lowest ranked sides from each group being promoted or relegated.

2017 and 2018 Beaumont Cup Division 2 North Table
	County	Played	Won	Drawn	Lost	Points For	Points Against	Points Difference	Try Bonus	Losing Bonus	Points
1	Durham County (P)	6	5	0	1	312	96	216	5	0	25
2	Leicestershire	6	5	0	1	258	107	151	5	0	25
3	Cumbria (R) (Note: Despite finishing 3rd overall during two seasons, Cumbria were relegated to the 2019 County Championship Shield instead of Staffordshire.)	6	1	0	5	90	285	-195	1	1	6
4	Staffordshire	6	1	0	5	108	372	-264	1	1	6
If teams are level at any stage, tiebreakers are applied in the following order: 1. Number of matches won 2. Difference between points for and against 3. Total number of points for 4. Aggregate number of points scored in matches between tied teams 5. Number of matches won excluding the first match, then the second and so on until the tie is settled
Green background means the county is promoted. Pink background means the county were demoted to Division 3 for the following season. Updated: 19 May 2018

2017 and 2018 Beaumont Cup Division 2 South Table
	County	Played	Won	Drawn	Lost	Points For	Points Against	Points Difference	Try Bonus	Losing Bonus	Points
1	Hampshire (P)	6	4	1	1	283	130	153	5	0	23
2	Warwickshire	6	3	1	2	167	179	-12	4	0	18
3	Somerset	6	3	1	2	173	189	-16	4	0	18
4	North Midlands (R)	6	0	1	5	160	285	-125	4	0	6
If teams are level at any stage, tiebreakers are applied in the following order: 1. Number of matches won 2. Difference between points for and against 3. Total number of points for 4. Aggregate number of points scored in matches between tied teams 5. Number of matches won excluding the first match, then the second and so on until the tie is settled
Green background means the county is promoted. Pink background means the county were demoted to Division 3 for the following season. Updated: 19 May 2018

== Individual statistics ==
- Note that points scorers includes tries as well as conversions, penalties and drop goals. Appearance figures also include coming on as substitutes (unused substitutes not included). Statistics will also include final.

=== Top points scorers ===
Rank	Player	County	Club Side	Appearances	Points
1	(England) Joel Knight	Hampshire	Havant	3	45
2	(England) Mitch McGahan	North Midlands	Bournville	3	26
3	(England) Rickie Aley	Leicestershire	South Leicester	3	25
3	(England) Callum Dacey	Leicestershire	Hinckley	3	25
3	(England) Oliver Hodgson	Durham County	Darlington Mowden Park	3	25
3	(England) Sean Moloney	Durham County	Middlesbrough	4	25

=== Top try scorers ===
Rank	Player	County	Club Side	Appearances	Tries
1	(England) Callum Dacey	Leicestershire	Hinckley	3	5
1	(England) Oliver Hodgson	Durham County	Darlington Mowden Park	3	5
1	(England) Sean Moloney	Durham County	Middlesbrough	3	5
2	(England) Conor Foley	Durham County	Middlesbrough	3	4
2	(England) Joel Knight	Hampshire	Havant	3	4

== Competition records ==
=== Team ===
Largest home win — 92 points

99 - 7 Durham County at home to Staffordshire on 12 May 2018

Largest away win — 60 points

66 - 5 Hampshire away to Somerset on 12 May 2018

Most points scored — 99 points

99 - 7 Durham County at home to Staffordshire on 12 May 2018

Most tries in a match — 15

Durham County at home to Staffordshire on 12 May 2018

Most conversions in a match — 12

Durham County at home to Staffordshire on 12 May 2018

Most penalties in a match — 2 (4)

Hampshire at home to North Midlands on 5 May 2018
Hampshire away to Somerset on 12 May 2018
Durham County at home to Leicestershire on 19 May 2018
Durham County versus Warwickshire at Twickenham on 27 May 2018

Most drop goals in a match — 0

=== Player ===
Most points in a match — 26

(England) Joel Knight for Hampshire away to Somerset on 12 May 2018

Most tries in a match — 3 (4)

(England) Grant Connon for Durham County at home to Staffordshire on 12 May 2018
(England) Callum Dacey for Leicestershire at home to Cumbria on 12 May 2018
(England) Oliver Hodgson for Durham County at home to Staffordshire on 12 May 2018
(England) Kemp Price for Hampshire away to Somerset on 12 May 2018

Most conversions in a match — 12

(South Africa) Warren Seals for Durham County at home to Staffordshire on 12 May 2018

Most penalties in a match — 2 (4)

(England) Grant Hancox for Hampshire at home to North Midlands on 5 May 2018
(England) Joel Knight for Hampshire away to Somerset on 12 May 2018
(England) Peter Evans for Durham County at home to Leicestershire on 19 May 2018
(England) Josh Bragman for Durham County versus Warwickshire at Twickenham on 27 May 2018

Most drop goals in a match — 0

== See also ==
- English rugby union system
- Rugby union in England
