= 2017 Bill Beaumont County Championship Division 2 =

- Countries: England
- Date: 6 May 2017 - 28 May 2017
- Champions: Leicestershire (1st title)
- Runners-up: Hampshire
- Matches played: 8
- Tries scored: 83 (average 10.4 per match)
- Top point scorer: (England) Callum Dacey (Leicestershire) 40
- Top try scorer: (England) Callum Dacey (Leicestershire) 8

The 2017 Bill Beaumont County Championship Division 2 was the 16th version of the annual English rugby union, County Championship organised by the RFU for the tier 2 English counties. This was the first season it would be officially known as Bill Beaumont Division 2 having previously been known as the County Championship Plate. Each county drew its players from rugby union clubs from the third tier and below of the English rugby union league system (typically National League 1, National League 2 North or National League 2 South). The counties were divided into two regional pools (north/south) with four teams in each and the winners of each pool meeting in the final at Twickenham Stadium.

Due to changes to the County Championship format (more detail of this below) four new teams were added to the competition, with Hampshire (winners) and Staffordshire (runners up) coming up due to reaching the final of the 2016 County Championship Shield, while Warwickshire and Cumbria were also promoted by virtue of their performances in the competition during the past two seasons. The changes also meant that there were no teams relegated into the division.

Leicestershire and Hampshire won their respective groups to qualify for the Twickenham final, with Leicestershire being the more impressive with three easy victories. The first half of the final was fairly close with Leicestershire going in 8-0 up, but in the second half they added a further four tries to win their first ever Division 2 competition by a final score of 39-7.

== Competition format ==
The competition format was two regional group stages divided into north and south with four teams in each group. This meant that two teams in the pool had two home games, while the other two had just one. The top side in each group went through to the final held at Twickenham Stadium. The RFU plans to switch this around the following year so that teams that played one home game in 2017 will get two during the 2018 competition.

Due to changes to the County Championships implemented for this competition there was no promotion for the Division 2 finalists as there had been in previous seasons. Instead, points will be accumulated over two seasons with the two most successful sides over that period being promoted to the top tier for the 2019 competition. The RFU has also introduced relegation to the division, with the bottom sides in each group over two years dropping to Division 3.

== Participating Counties and ground locations ==
County	Stadium(s)	Capacity	City/Area
Cumbria	Bleach Green	N/A	Egremont, Cumbria
Durham County	Mayfield Park	N/A	Hartlepool, County Durham
Hampshire	Gosport Park; Hook's Lane	N/A; 1,500 (500 seats)	Gosport, Hampshire; Bedhampton, Havant, Hampshire
Leicestershire	Ashby Lane; Showground Way	N/A	Lutterworth, Leicestershire; Barleythorpe, Oakham, Rutland
North Midlands	Heathbrook	2,260 (260 seats)	Kingswinford, West Midlands
Somerset	Old Bath Road	5,000	Bridgwater, Somerset
Staffordshire	Cooke Fields; Trentham Fields	N/A; N/A	Lichfield, Staffordshire; Longton, Stoke-on-Trent, Staffordshire
Warwickshire	Webb Ellis Road	4,000 (200 seats)	Rugby, Warwickshire

Locations of the 2017 Division 2 county teams

== Group stage ==
=== Division 2 North ===
2017 Bill Beaumont Division 2 North Table
	County	Played	Won	Drawn	Lost	Points For	Points Against	Points Difference	Try Bonus	Losing Bonus	Points
1	Leicestershire (Q)	3	3	0	0	152	39	113	3	0	15
2	Durham County	3	2	0	1	117	74	43	2	0	10
3	Cumbria	3	1	0	2	61	136	-75	1	0	5
4	Staffordshire	3	0	0	3	43	124	-81	0	0	0
If teams are level at any stage, tiebreakers are applied in the following order: 1. Number of matches won 2. Difference between points for and against 3. Total number of points for 4. Aggregate number of points scored in matches between tied teams 5. Number of matches won excluding the first match, then the second and so on until the tie is settled
Green background means the county qualified for the final. Updated: 20 May 2017; Source: "County Championships". englandrugby.com.

==== Round 1 ====
6 May 2017
14:30

(BP) Leicestershire	45 - 7	Staffordshire

Ashby Lane, Lutterworth

6 May 2017
15:00

(BP) Durham County	62 - 5	Cumbria
	Report

Mayfield Park, Hartlepool

==== Round 2 ====
13 May 2017
15:00

Cumbria	18 - 52	Leicestershire (BP)
	Report

Bleach Green, Egremont

13 May 2017
15:00

Staffordshire	14 - 41	Durham County (BP)
	Report

Cooke Fields, Lichfield

==== Round 3 ====
20 May 2017
14:30

(BP) Leicestershire	55 - 14	Durham County

Showground Way, Barleythorpe, Oakham

20 May 2017
15:00

Staffordshire	22 - 38	Cumbria (BP)

Trentham Fields, Longton, Stoke-on-Trent

=== Division 2 South ===
2017 Bill Beaumont Division 2 South Table
	County	Played	Won	Drawn	Lost	Points For	Points Against	Points Difference	Try Bonus	Losing Bonus	Points
1	Hampshire (Q)	3	2	1	0	137	59	78	3	0	13
2	Somerset	3	2	1	0	117	70	47	3	0	13
3	North Midlands	3	0	1	2	89	156	-67	2	0	4
4	Warwickshire	3	0	1	2	80	138	-58	1	0	3
If teams are level at any stage, tiebreakers are applied in the following order: 1. Number of matches won 2. Difference between points for and against 3. Total number of points for 4. Aggregate number of points scored in matches between tied teams 5. Number of matches won excluding the first match, then the second and so on until the tie is settled
Green background means the county qualified for the final. Updated: 20 May 2017; Source: "County Championships". englandrugby.com.

==== Round 1 ====
6 May 2017
15:00

North Midlands	13 - 62	Hampshire (BP)
	Report

Heathbrook, Kingswinford
Referee: Claire Hodnett

6 May 2017
15:00

(BP) Somerset	43 - 14	Warwickshire
	Report

Old Bath Road, Bridgwater
Referee: Jack Lewars

==== Round 2 ====
13 May 2017
15:00

(BP) Hampshire	36 - 36	Somerset (BP)
	Report

Gosport Park, Gosport
Referee: Gareth Holsgrove

13 May 2017
15:00

(BP) Warwickshire	56 - 56	North Midlands (BP)
	Report

Webb Ellis Road, Rugby

==== Round 3 ====
20 May 2017
15:00

(BP) Hampshire	39 - 10	Warwickshire

Hook's Lane, Bedhampton, Havant

20 May 2017
15:00

(BP) North Midlands	20 - 38	Somerset (BP)

Heathbrook, Kingswinford

== Final ==
28 May 2017
17:00

Leicestershire	39 - 7	Hampshire
	Report

Twickenham Stadium, London
Referee: Neil Chivers

== Individual statistics ==
- Note that points scorers includes tries as well as conversions, penalties and drop goals. Appearance figures also include coming on as substitutes (unused substitutes not included). Statistics will also include final.

=== Top points scorers ===
Rank	Player	County	Club Side	Appearances	Points
1	(England) Callum Dacey	Leicestershire	Hinckley	4	40
2	(England) Ricky Aley	Leicestershire	South Leicester	4	33
3	(England) Fraser Wilson	Durham County	Blaydon	3	30
3	(England) Pierre-Alex Clarke	Hampshire	Tottonians	4	30
4	(England) Alex Everett-Bolter	Hampshire	Bournemouth	4	25

=== Top try scorers ===
Rank	Player	County	Club Side	Appearances	Tries
1	(England) Callum Dacey	Leicestershire	Hinckley	4	8
2	(England) Fraser Wilson	Durham County	Blaydon	3	6
3	(England) Alex Everett-Bolter	Hampshire	Bournemouth	4	5
4	(England) Tom Johnson	North Midlands	Moseley Oak	1 (Note: Tom Johnson may have also played in North Midlands 20-38 loss to Somerset but press coverage is very poor so it not certain if he played in this game.)	4
4	(England) Richard Buck	Hampshire	Tottonians	2	4
4	(England) Callum Gunn	Leicestershire	South Leicester	2 (Note: Callum Gunn may have also played in Leicestershire's 45-7 win over Staffordshire but press coverage is very poor so it not certain if he played in this game.)	4
4	(England) Kemp Price	Hampshire	University of the West of England	3	4

== Competition records ==
=== Team ===
Largest home win —

62 - 5 Durham County at home to Cumbria on 6 May 2017

Largest away win — 49 points

62 - 13 Hampshire away to North Midlands on 6 May 2017

Most points scored — 62 (x2)

62 - 5 Durham County at home to Cumbria on 6 May 2017
62 - 13 Hampshire away to North Midlands on 6 May 2017

Most tries in a match — 10 (x2)

Durham County at home to Cumbria on 6 May 2017
Hampshire away to North Midlands on 6 May 2017

Most conversions in a match — 8

Warwickshire at home to North Midlands on 13 May 2017

Most penalties in a match — 4

Hampshire at home to Somerset on 13 May 2017

Most drop goals in a match — 0

=== Player ===
Most points in a match — 20 (x2)

(England) Richard Buck for Hampshire at home to North Midlands on 6 May 2017
(England) Tom Johnson for North Midlands away to Warwickshire on 13 May 2017

Most tries in a match — 4 (x2)

(England) Richard Buck for Hampshire at home to North Midlands on 6 May 2017
(England) Tom Johnson for North Midlands away to Warwickshire on 13 May 2017

Most conversions in a match — 8

(England) Ben Palmer for Warwickshire at home to North Midlands on 13 May 2017

Most penalties in a match — 4

(England) Pierre-Alex Clarke for Hampshire at home to Somerset on 13 May 2017

Most drop goals in a match — 0

== See also ==
- English rugby union system
- Rugby union in England
