= 2016 County Championship Plate =

English rugby union competition

- Countries: England
- Date: 7 May 2016 - 29 May 2016
- Champions: East Midlands (1st title)
- Runners-up: Kent
- Attendance: 3,596 (average 320 per match)
- Highest attendance: 820 Devon v Somerset (7 May 2016)
- Lowest attendance: 80 Durham County v Leicestershire (7 May 2016)
- Top point scorer: (England) Joe Daniel; East Midlands 38
- Top try scorer: (Tonga) Maama Molitika; East Midlands 6

The 2016 County Championship Plate, also known as Bill Beaumont Cup Division 2, was the 15th version of the annual English rugby union, County Championship organised by the RFU for the tier 2 English counties. Each county drew its players from rugby union clubs from the third tier and below of the English rugby union league system (typically National League 1, National League 2 North or National League 2 South). The counties were divided into two regional pools (north/south) with four teams in each and the winners of each pool meet in the final to be held at Twickenham Stadium. New counties to the division included Kent and Durham County who were relegated from the 2015 Bill Beaumont Cup while Leicestershire were promoted as the winners of the 2015 County Championship Shield.

At the end of the pool stage, pool winners East Midlands (north) and Kent (south) met in the final at Twickenham. Despite it being their first final against regulars Kent, East Midlands won 33-27, with former Tongan international, Maama Molitika, scoring three tries in the game. He would finish as the competition's top try scorer.

== Competition format ==
The competition format is two regional group stages divided into north and south, with each team playing each other once. This means that two teams in the pool have two home games, while the other two had just one. The top side in each group goes through to the final held at Twickenham Stadium, with both teams also being promoted to the top tier for the following season. Typically there was no relegation although teams have dropped out/been invited to join the division.

Due to changes to the County Championships to be implemented for the 2017 competition, four teams instead of two would be promoted to the top tier. This meant that the two group winners would be joined by two other teams from the plate competition based on how well they have done over the past couple of seasons.

== Participating Counties and ground locations ==
Locations of the 2016 County Championship Plate county teams

County	Stadium(s)	Capacity	City/Area
Devon	Bitton Park Sports Ground	1,210 (210 seats)	Teignmouth, Devon
Durham County	Crow Trees (Note: Durham were originally meant to play their first county game at Eastwood Gardens, home of Gateshead, but a late switch in venue meant that they would play at Blaydon's home ground of Crow Trees instead.); Brinkburn	2,000 (400 seats); 1,000 (76 seats)	Swalwell, Tyne and Wear; Hartlepool, County Durham
East Midlands	Rushmere Road; Fortress Fengate	N/A; N/A	Northampton, Northamptonshire; Peterborough, Cambridgeshire
Kent	Merton Lane; Priestfields	1,500 (75 seats); N/A	Canterbury, Kent; Rochester, Kent
Leicestershire	Hinckley Road	N/A	Leicester Forest East, Leicestershire
North Midlands	Heathbrook	2,260 (260 seats)	Kingswinford, West Midlands
Northumberland	Grange House Field	1,000	Morpeth, Northumberland
Somerset	Hyde Park	2,000 (198 seats)	Taunton, Somerset

== Group stage ==
=== Division 2 North ===
2016 Beaumont Cup Division 2 North Table
	County	Played	Won	Drawn	Lost	Points For	Points Against	Points Difference	Try Bonus	Losing Bonus	Points
1	East Midlands (P)	3	3	0	0	90	36	54	2	0	14
2	Leicestershire	3	2	0	1	60	73	-13	1	0	9
3	Northumberland (P) (Note: Northumberland would be promoted to tier 1 for the 2017 season due to competition restructuring, based on performances over the past couple of seasons.)	3	1	0	2	45	58	-13	1	0	5
4	Durham County	3	0	0	3	76	104	-28	1	0	1
If teams are level at any stage, tiebreakers are applied in the following order: 1. Number of matches won 2. Difference between points for and against 3. Total number of points for 4. Aggregate number of points scored in matches between tied teams 5. Number of matches won excluding the first match, then the second and so on until the tie is settled
Green background means the county qualified for the final and is also promoted to the Division 1 North of the Bill Beaumont Cup for the following season. Updated: 12 May 2016; Source: "County Championships". englandrugby.com.

==== Round 1 ====
7 May 2016
15:00

Northumberland	7 - 17	East Midlands
	Report

Grange House Field, Morpeth
Attendance: 252
Referee: Callum Sharp

7 May 2016
15:15

(BP) Durham County	28 - 38	Leicestershire (BP)
	Report

Crow Trees, Swalwell
Attendance: 80
Referee: Ben Rayner

==== Round 2 ====
14 May 2016
15:00

Durham County	29 - 38	Northumberland (BP)
	Report

Brinkburn, Hartlepool
Attendance: 297
Referee: Chris Dennis

14 May 2016
15:00

(BP) East Midlands	45 - 10	Leicestershire

Rushmere Road, Northampton
Attendance: 320
Referee: Neil Chivers

==== Round 3 ====
21 May 2016
14:30

Leicestershire	12 - 0	Northumberland
	Report

Hinckley Road, Leicester Forest East
Attendance: 250
Referee: Robert Teare

21 May 2016
15:00

(BP) East Midlands	28 - 19	Durham County
	Report

Fortress Fengate, Peterborough
Attendance: 450
Referee: Simon Harding

=== Division 2 South ===
2016 Beaumont Cup Division 2 South Table
	County	Played	Won	Drawn	Lost	Points For	Points Against	Points Difference	Try Bonus	Losing Bonus	Points
1	Kent (P)	3	2	0	1	94	62	32	2	1	11
2	Devon (P) (Note: Devon would be promoted to tier 1 for the 2017 season due to competition restructuring, based on performances over the past couple of seasons.)	3	2	0	1	97	57	40	2	0	10
3	Somerset	3	2	0	1	50	68	-18	0	0	8
4	North Midlands	3	0	0	3	53	107	-54	1	1	2
If teams are level at any stage, tiebreakers are applied in the following order: 1. Number of matches won 2. Difference between points for and against 3. Total number of points for 4. Aggregate number of points scored in matches between tied teams 5. Number of matches won excluding the first match, then the second and so on until the tie is settled
Green background means the county qualified for the final and is also promoted to the Division 1 South of the Bill Beaumont Cup for the following season. Updated: 21 May 2016; Source: "County Championships". englandrugby.com.

==== Round 1 ====
7 May 2016
15:00

(BP) Devon	39 - 10	Somerset
	Report

Bitton Park Sports Ground, Teignmouth
Attendance: 820
Referee: Adam Leal

7 May 2016
15:00

(BP) Kent	43 - 28	North Midlands (BP)
	Kent Report; North Midlands Report

Merton Lane, Canterbury
Attendance: 230
Referee: Daniel Collins

==== Round 2 ====
14 May 2016
14:30

Somerset	26 - 22	Kent (BP)
	Report

Hyde Park, Taunton
Attendance: 260
Referee: Don Conway

14 May 2016
15:00

North Midlands	18 - 50	Devon (BP)
	Report

Heathbrook, Kingswinford
Attendance: 203
Referee: Matt Turvey

==== Round 3 ====
21 May 2016
14:30

Somerset	14 - 7	North Midlands (BP)
	Report

Hyde Park, Taunton
Attendance: 150
Referee: Luis Caviglia

21 May 2016
15:00

(BP) Kent	29 - 8	Devon
	Report

Priestfields, Rochester
Attendance: 284
Referee: David Clarkson

== Final ==
29 May 2016

East Midlands	33 - 27	Kent
	Report

Twickenham Stadium, London

== Total season attendances ==
- Does not include final at Twickenham which is a neutral venue and involves teams from all three county divisions on the same day

County	Home Games	Total	Average	Highest	Lowest	% Capacity
Devon	1	820	820	820	820	68%
Durham County	2	377	189	297	80	17%
East Midlands	2	770	385	450	320	
Kent	2	514	257	284	230	15%
Leicestershire	1	250	250	250	250	
North Midlands	1	203	203	203	203	9%
Northumberland	1	252	252	252	252	25%
Somerset	2	410	205	260	150	10%

== Individual statistics ==
- Note that points scorers includes tries as well as conversions, penalties and drop goals. Appearance figures also include coming on as substitutes (unused substitutes not included). Statistics will also include final.

=== Top points scorers ===
Rank	Player	County	Club Side	Appearances	Points
1	(England) Joe Daniel	East Midlands	Kettering	4	38
2	(Tonga) Maama Molitika	East Midlands	Ampthill	4	30
3	(England) Josh Bragman	Durham County	Hull	3	26
4	(England) Brad Barnes	Somerset	Clifton	2	25
5	(England) Jordan Petherbridge	Devon	Barnstaple	2	22

=== Top try scorers ===
Rank	Player	County	Club Side	Appearances	Tries
1	(Tonga) Maama Molitika	East Midlands	Ampthill	4	6
2	(England) Callum Mackenzie	Durham County	Darlington Mowden Park	3	4
3	(England) Dan Williams	Devon	Torquay Athletic	2	3
3	(England) Ben Haigh	Northumberland	Tynedale	3	3
3	(England) Terry Read	Kent	Canterbury	3	3

== See also ==
- English rugby union system
- Rugby union in England
