= 2019 Bill Beaumont County Championship Division 2 =

English rugby union competition

- Countries: England
- Date: 4 May 2019 – 8 June 2019
- Top point scorer: (England) Joe Wilson (Leicestershire); 44 points
- Top try scorer: (England) Callum Dacey (Leicestershire); 4 tries

The 2019 Bill Beaumont County Championship Division 2 was the 18th version of the competition that is part of the annual English rugby union County Championship organised by the RFU for the tier 2 English counties. Each county drew its players from rugby union clubs from the third tier and below of the English rugby union league system (typically National League 1, National League 2 North or National League 2 South). The counties were divided into two regional sections with the winners of each meeting in the final held at Twickenham Stadium.

At the end of the group stage, Leicestershire were dominant in Pool 1, winning all three games (albeit one which was a walkover), including an impressive win against a strong East Midlands side, while Surrey were equally impressive in topping Pool 2, also winning three out of three. In the final, Leicestershire finished as convincing winners with an emphatic 38 – 13 victory over Surrey, in what was their second division title in three years.

== Competition format ==
The competition format is two regional group stages divided into north and south with four teams in each group. This means that two teams in the pool had two home games, while the other two had just one. The RFU have taken fixtures from the previous year into account so that county sides that only played one home game in that competition now get two games and vice versa. At the end of the group stage the top teams with the best record from each group (north and south) advance to the final held on 2 June 2019 at Twickenham Stadium.

Promotion and relegation occurs every two seasons, with accumulated points taken into consideration. At the end of the 2017–18 season, Durham (north) and Hampshire (south) were promoted to Division 1, replacing East Midlands (north) and Surrey (south) who dropped down into Division 2. Cumbria and North Midlands were relegated into Division 3, being replaced by promoted sides, Essex and Sussex. There will now be no promotion or relegation until the end of the 2020 competition.

== Participating Counties and ground locations ==
County	Stadium(s)	Capacity	City/Area
East Midlands	Waverley Road	2,000	Kettering, Northamptonshire
Essex	Latton Park; Ilford Wanderers Sports Ground		Harlow, Essex; Ilford, London
Leicestershire	Memorial Ground; Vipers Ground		Coalville, Leicestershire; Whetstone, Leicestershire
Somerset	Commsplus Stadium	2,000 (198 seats)	Taunton, Somerset
Staffordshire	Cooke Fields; Hartwell Lane		Lichfield, Staffordshire; Barlaston, Staffordshire
Surrey	Molesey Road	3,500 (1,200 seats)	Hersham, Surrey
Sussex	Roundstone Lane	1,500 (100 seats)	Angmering, West Sussex
Warwickshire	Liberty Way	4,314 (514 seats)	Nuneaton, Warwickshire

Locations of the 2019 Division 2 county teams

== Group stage ==
=== Division 2 North ===
2019 Bill Beaumont Division 2 North Table
	County	Played	Won	Drawn	Lost	Points For	Points Against	Points Difference	Try Bonus	Losing Bonus	Points
1	Leicestershire (Q)	3	3	0	0	107	20	87	2	0	15 (Note: Leicestershire awarded a five point win against Staffordshire, who could not raise a side.)
2	East Midlands	3	2	0	1	107	56	51	2	0	10
3	Warwickshire	3	1	0	2	90	172	-82	1	0	5
4	Staffordshire	3	0	0	3	52	108	-56	1	0	-4 (Note: Staffordshire were deducted five points for failing to raise a side for their game against Leicestershire.)
If teams are level at any stage, tiebreakers are applied in the following order: 1. Number of matches won 2. Difference between points for and against 3. Total number of points for 4. Aggregate number of points scored in matches between tied teams 5. Number of matches won excluding the first match, then the second and so on until the tie is settled
Green background means the county qualified for the final. Updated: 18 May 2019; Source: "County Championships". englandrugby.com.

==== Round 1 ====
4 May 2019
15:00

(1 BP) East Midlands	42 – 27	Warwickshire
	Warwickshire

Waverley Road, Kettering
Referee: Matthew Astle

4 May 2019
15:00

Leicestershire	w/o	Staffordshire

Memorial Ground, Coaville

- The match was scratched and Leicestershire were awarded a five point win after Staffordshire could not raise a side; Staffordshire were also deducted five points.

==== Round 2 ====
11 May 2019
15:00

Staffordshire	0 – 45	East Midlands (1 BP)
	East Midlands

Cooke Fields, Lichfield

11 May 2019
15:00

Warwickshire	0 – 78	Leicestershire (1 BP)
	Warwickshire

Liberty Way, Nuneaton
Referee: Peter Caunt

==== Round 3 ====
18 May 2019
15:00

(1 BP) Leicestershire	29 – 20	East Midlands

Vipers Ground, Whetstone

18 May 2019
15:00

(1 BP) Staffordshire	52 – 63	Warwickshire (1 BP)

Hartwell Lane, Barlaston

=== Division 2 South ===
2019 Bill Beaumont Division 2 South Table
	County	Played	Won	Drawn	Lost	Points For	Points Against	Points Difference	Try Bonus	Losing Bonus	Points
1	Surrey (Q)	3	3	0	0	144	57	87	3	0	15
2	Somerset	3	1	0	2	104	102	2	3	1	8
3	Sussex	3	1	0	2	90	90	0	1	0	5
4	Essex	3	1	0	2	49	138	-89	1	0	5
If teams are level at any stage, tiebreakers are applied in the following order: 1. Number of matches won 2. Difference between points for and against 3. Total number of points for 4. Aggregate number of points scored in matches between tied teams 5. Number of matches won excluding the first match, then the second and so on until the tie is settled
Green background means the county qualified for the final. Updated: 18 May 2019; Source: "County Championships". englandrugby.com.

==== Round 1 ====
4 May 2019
15:00

(1 BP) Surrey	31 – 14	Sussex

Molesey Road, Hersham

4 May 2019
15:15

(1 BP) Essex	27 – 24	Somerset (2 BP)

Latton Park, Harlow

==== Round 2 ====
11 May 2019
15:00

(1 BP) Surrey	46 – 24	Somerset (1 BP)

Molesey Road, Hersham

11 May 2019
15:00

(1 BP) Sussex	47 – 3	Essex
	Sussex

Roundstone Lane, Angmering

==== Round 3 ====
18 May 2019
15:00

Essex	19 – 67	Surrey (1 BP)

Ilford Wanderers Sports Ground, Ilford, London

18 May 2019
15:00

(1 BP) Somerset	56 – 29	Sussex (1 BP)

Commsplus Stadium, Taunton

== Final ==
8 June 2019
15:00

Leicestershire	38 – 13	Surrey

Twickenham Stadium, London

== Individual statistics ==
- Note that points scorers includes tries as well as conversions, penalties and drop goals. Appearance figures also include coming on as substitutes (unused substitutes not included). Statistics also include final. Unfortunately due to poor press reporting the majority of scorers outside of the East Midlands, Leicestershire and Surrey teams are unknown.

=== Top points scorers ===
Rank	Player	County	Club Side	Points
1	(England) Joe Wilson	Leicestershire	Hinckley	44
2	(England) Greg Lound	Surrey	Rosslyn Park	29
3	(England) Charlie Reed	East Midlands	Loughborough Students	22
4	(England) Callum Dacey	Leicestershire	Hinckley	20
5	(England) Jac Lloyd Evans	Staffordshire	Keele University	17

=== Top try scorers ===
Rank	Player	County	Club Side	Tries
1	(England) Callum Dacey	Leicestershire	Hinckley	4
2	(England) Nick Defeo	East Midlands	Peterborough Lions	3
2	(England) Rory Mitchell	Surrey	Dorking	3
2	(England) Ed Sumpter	Leicestershire	Leicester Lions	3
2	(England) Callum Watson	Surrey	Dorking	3

== Competition records ==
=== Team ===
Largest home win — 44 points

47 – 3 Sussex at home to Essex on 11 May 2019

Largest away win — 78 points

78 – 0 Leicestershire away to Warwickshire on 11 May 2019

Most points scored — 42

78 – 0 Leicestershire away to Warwickshire on 11 May 2019

Most tries in a match — 12

Leicestershire away to Warwickshire on 11 May 2019

Most conversions in a match — 9

Leicestershire away to Warwickshire on 11 May 2019

Most penalties in a match — 3

East Midlands at home to Warwickshire on 4 May 2019

Most drop goals in a match — 1

Warwickshire away to East Midlands on 4 May 2019

=== Player ===
Most points in a match — 24

(England) Joe Wilson for Leicestershire away to Warwickshire on 11 May 2019

Most tries in a match — 2

Multiple players

Most conversions in a match — 8

(England) Carlie Carter for Somerset at home to Sussex on 18 May 2019

Most penalties in a match — 3

(England) Charlie Reed for East Midlands at home to Warwickshire on 4 May 2019

Most drop goals in a match — 1

(England) Dan O'Brien for Warwickshire away to East Midlands on 4 May 2019

== See also ==
- English rugby union system
- Rugby union in England
