= Bill Beaumont County Championship Division 2 =

Annual rugby union competition in England

- Current season, competition or edition: 2025 Bill Beaumont County Championship Division 2
- Sport: Rugby union
- Founded: 2002; 24 years ago
- No. of teams: 12
- Country: England
- Most recent champion: Cheshire (2025) (3rd title)
- Most titles: Northumberland (4)
- Related competitions: Bill Beaumont Division 1 Bill Beaumont Division 3

The Bill Beaumont County Championship Division 2 (formerly known as County Championship Plate) is an annual rugby union competition in England between teams representing English counties. It was formed in 2002 as the County Championship Shield (a competition which is now played by tier 3 sides) - changing to Plate by 2010 and then to Bill Beaumont Division 2 by 2017.

Division 2 is split into three regional groups (Pools 1,2 and 3) with each team alternating between 2 home games and 1 away game in one championship cycle, and 1 home game and 2 away games in the next, with the top teams and the best placed runner up playing in a Semi-final, with the winners meeting in a final held at Twickenham Stadium along with other county divisional finals. Since the covid pandemic and a decline in counties entering, Promotion and Relegation have been replaced by counties opting into a preferred division, with a Level cap preventing uneven games. Division 2's Level cap is level 5 of the English rugby union system, meaning counties can only select from Regional 1 and below.

== Past winners ==
Year	Date	Winners	Score	Runner-up	Venue	Attendance/Notes
2002	2 June	Warwickshire	34 - 12	Berkshire	Twickenham Stadium, London	
2003	25 May	Northumberland	27 - 8	Oxfordshire	Twickenham Stadium, London	
2004	29 May	North Midlands	58 - 5	Eastern Counties	Twickenham Stadium, London	
2005	29 May	Hertfordshire	20 - 13	North Midlands	Twickenham Stadium, London	
2006	29 May	Cheshire	32 - 17	Middlesex	Twickenham Stadium, London	
2007	27 May	Warwickshire	22 - 8	Somerset	Butts Park Arena, Coventry	
2008	31 May	Northumberland	25 – 11	Cornwall	Twickenham Stadium, London	1,500
2009	30 May	Cheshire	30 - 22	Hertfordshire	Twickenham Stadium, London	
2010 (Note: Changed name from County Championship Shield to County Championship Plate.)	29 May	Kent	33 - 27	Warwickshire	Rectory Field, London	
2011	28 May	Northumberland	31 - 17	North Midlands	Greensfield, Alnwick	
2012	No Final (Note: This season there was no Plate final for the division two teams only promotion for the top sides in each group.)					
2013	26 May	Northumberland	45 - 10	North Midlands	Twickenham Stadium, London	
2014	1 June	Kent	31 - 23	Durham County	Twickenham Stadium, London	
2015	31 May	Surrey	17 - 3	Eastern Counties	Twickenham Stadium, London	
2016	29 May	East Midlands	33 - 27	Kent	Twickenham Stadium, London	
2017 (Note: Changed name from County Championship Plate to Bill Beaumont Division 2.)	28 May	Leicestershire	39 - 7	Hampshire	Twickenham Stadium, London	
2018	27 May	Durham County	46 - 12	Warwickshire	Twickenham Stadium, London	
2019	8 June	Leicestershire	38 - 13	Surrey	Twickenham Stadium, London	
2020–2021	No Competition due to COVID-19 pandemic in the United Kingdom					
2022	4 June	Somerset	36 - 20	Staffordshire	Twickenham Stadium, London	
2023	3 June	Dorset and Wilts	37 - 15	Durham	Twickenham Stadium, London	
2024	15 June	Oxfordshire	38 - 37	Cheshire	Twickenham Stadium, London	
2025	22 June	Cheshire	50 - 38	Devon	Twickenham Stadium, London	

== Number of wins ==
- Northumberland (4)
- Cheshire (3)
- Kent (2)
- Leicestershire (2)
- Warwickshire (2)
- Durham County (1)
- East Midlands (1)
- Hertfordshire (1)
- North Midlands (1)
- Surrey (1)
- Somerset (1)
- Dorset & Wilts (1)
- Oxfordshire (1)

== See also ==
2011_results.pdf
