= Bill Beaumont County Championship Division 3 =

Rugby union competition in England

- Current season, competition or edition: 2024 Bill Beaumont County Championship Division 3
- Sport: Rugby union
- Founded: 2005; 21 years ago
- No. of teams: 8
- Country: England
- Most recent champion: Oxfordshire (2023) (3rd title)
- Most titles: Surrey (4)
- Related competitions: Bill Beaumont Division 1 Bill Beaumont Division 3

The Bill Beaumont County Championship Division 3 (formerly County Championship Shield) is an annual rugby union competition in England between teams representing English counties. It was formed in 2005 when it known as the County Championship Plate (a competition which is now played by tier 2 sides)—changing to Shield by 2010 and Bill Beaumont Division 3 by 2017. It is contested by third tier teams in the RFU County Championship. From 2010 Division 3 involves counties that are only able to select players from clubs at level five and below. The eight teams involved are divided roughly on geographic terms into two pools and play three games each.

From 2017 promotion has been implemented in the competition (previously the only way out of the division was by invitation). As with the other county championship divisions, this occurs over two years as opposed to one, using a system of accumulative points from pool games to determine the top two teams (one from each group) that are promoted to tier 2. Likewise the bottom two teams in tier 2 (again, one in each group) are relegated into tier 3 at the end of the two-year period.

== Past winners ==
Year	Date	Winners	Score	Runner-up	Venue	Notes
2005	29 May	Surrey	29–18	Somerset	Twickenham Stadium, London	
2006	29 May	Notts, Lincs & Derbyshire	21–17	Oxfordshire	Twickenham Stadium, London	
2007	25 May	Durham County	30–20	Eastern Counties	The New Friarage, Hartlepool	
2008	24 May	Hampshire	22–12	Leicestershire	Aldershot Military Stadium, Aldershot	
2009	30 May	Durham County	29–14	Kent	Blackwell Meadows, Darlington	
2010 (Note: Changed named from County Championship Plate to County Championship Shield.)	29 May	Dorset & Wilts	36–26	Leicestershire	Twickenham Stadium, London	
2011	28 May	Dorset & Wilts	43–22	Surrey	Twickenham Stadium, London	
2012	27 May	Surrey	43–12	Leicestershire	Twickenham Stadium, London	
2013	26 May	Surrey	21–16	Cumbria	Twickenham Stadium, London	
2014	1 June	Surrey	39–16	Leicestershire	Twickenham Stadium, London	
2015	31 May	Leicestershire	34–17	Cumbria	Twickenham Stadium, London	
2016	29 May	Hampshire	33–11	Staffordshire	Twickenham Stadium, London	
2017 (Note: Changed name from County Championship Shield to Bill Beaumont Division 3.)	28 May	Oxfordshire	29–29 (Note: Oxfordshire won the 2017 County Championship Shield by virtue of tries scored—5 to 4.)	Sussex	Twickenham Stadium, London	
2018	27 May	Dorset & Wilts	24–22	Essex	Athletic Ground, London	
2019	8 June	Cumbria	23–13	Dorset & Wilts	Twickenham Stadium, London	
2020-2021	No Competition due to COVID-19 pandemic in the United Kingdom					
2022	4 June	Oxfordshire	7–5	Berkshire	Athletic Ground, London	
2023	3 June	Oxfordshire	42-7	Essex	Ealing Trailfinders, London	

== Number of wins ==
- Surrey (4)
- Dorset & Wilts (3)
- Durham County (2)
- Hampshire (2)
- Oxfordshire (3)
- Cumbria (1)
- Leicestershire (1)
- Notts, Lincs & Derbyshire (1)
