= Oxfordshire Rugby Football Union =

(England) Oxfordshire RFU
- Full name: Oxfordshire Rugby Football Union
- Union: RFU
- Founded: 1931; 95 years ago
- Region: Oxfordshire
- Chairman: Peter Bramley
- President: Stuart Mount
Team kit

Official website
- oxfordshirerfu.com

The Oxfordshire Rugby Football Union is the governing body for the sport of rugby union in the county of Oxfordshire in England. The union is the constituent body of the Rugby Football Union (RFU) for Oxfordshire, and administers and organises rugby union clubs and competitions in the county. It also administers the Oxfordshire county rugby representative teams.

== History ==
The Oxfordshire RFU was first formed during the 1931–32 season with L.C. Gower being the first ever president. There is little of note of the county's early history although a county cup competition was introduced for local clubs during the 1970s. In 2003 the men's senior team reached the final of the County Championship Shield (now Plate) losing 8–27 to Northumberland at Twickenham Stadium. In 2006 they made Twickenham for second time, this time in the final of the County Championship Plate (now Shield), losing 17–21 to Notts, Lincs & Derbyshire. In 2017 the county made it third time lucky in the 2017 County Championship Shield final, edging Sussex by virtue of tries scored after the game finished 29–29.

== Oxfordshire senior men's county side ==
The Oxfordshire seniors men's team currently play in Division 2 of the County Championship.

Honours:

- County Championship Division 3 winners: 2017, 2022,
- County Championship Division 2 winners: 2024

== Affiliated clubs ==
There are currently 17 clubs affiliated with the Oxfordshire RFU, with teams at both senior and junior level.

- Abingdon RUFC
- Banbury RUFC
- Bicester RUFC
- Chinnor RFC
- Chipping Norton RUFC
- Didcot RUFC
- Faringdon RUFC
- Gosford All Blacks RFC

- Grove RFC
- Harwell RFC
- Henley Hawks RFC
- Littlemore RFC
- Oxford RFC
- Oxford Harlequins RFC
- Wallingford RFC
- Wheatley RUFC
- Witney RUFC

== County club competitions ==
The Oxfordshire RFU currently helps run the following club competitions:

=== Leagues ===
Since 2000–01 the league system in this region is combined between three rugby football unions – Buckinghamshire, Berkshire and Oxfordshire. Prior to this Buckinghamshire and Oxfordshire had run a combined league, while Berkshire had been grouped with Dorset & Wilts. Currently there are several divisions for first teams in the region including:

==== Level 2 ====
- RFU Championship

==== Level 3 ====
- National League 1

==== Level 4 ====
- National League 2 East
- National League 2 West

==== Level 5 ====
- Regional 1 South Central
- Regional 1 South West
- Regional 1 Midlands

==== Level 6 ====
- Regional 2 Thames
- Regional 2 South Central
- Regional 2 South West
- Regional 2 Severn

==== Level 7 ====
- Counties 1 Southern North
- Counties 1 Southern South

==== Level 8 ====
- Counties 2 Berks/Bucks & Oxon North
- Counties 2 Berks/Bucks & Oxon South

==== Level 9 ====
- Counties 3 Berks/Bucks & Oxon North
- Counties 3 Berks/Bucks & Oxon South

==== Level 10 ====
- Counties 4 Berks/Bucks & Oxon North
- Counties 4 Berks/Bucks & Oxon South

=== 2026-27 Leagues breakdown ===
CLUB 1ST XV
CLUB 2ND XV
CLUB 3RD XV
CLUB 4TH XV
| League | Tier | Number of Clubs | Clubs |
| Championship | 2 | 1 | Chinnor RFC 1st XV |
| National League 2 East | 4 | 1 | Henley Hawks 1st XV |
| Regional 1 Midlands | 5 | 2 | Banbury RUFC 1st XV |
| Regional 1 Midlands | 5 | 2 | Oxford Harlequins RFC 1st XV |
| Regional 2 Severn | 6 | 2 | Chinnor RFC 3rd XV |
| Regional 2 Severn | 6 | 2 | Witney RFC 1st XV |
| Counties 1 Tribute Southern North | 7 | 5 | Banbury RUFC 2nd XV |
| Counties 1 Tribute Southern North | 7 | 5 | Bicester RFC 1st XV |
| Counties 1 Tribute Southern North | 7 | 5 | Henley Hawks 2nd XV |
| Counties 1 Tribute Southern North | 7 | 5 | Oxford Harlequins RFC 2nd XV |
| Counties 1 Tribute Southern North | 7 | 5 | Oxford RFC 1st XV |
| Counties 2 Tribute Berks/Bucks & Oxon East | 8 | 1 | Chinnor RFC 4th XV |
| Counties 2 Tribute Berks/Bucks & Oxon West | 8 | 7 | Abingdon RFC 1st XV |
| Counties 2 Tribute Berks/Bucks & Oxon West | 8 | 7 | Chipping Norton RFC 1st XV |
| Counties 2 Tribute Berks/Bucks & Oxon West | 8 | 7 | Didcot RFC 1st XV |
| Counties 2 Tribute Berks/Bucks & Oxon West | 8 | 7 | Gosford All Blacks RFC 1st XV |
| Counties 2 Tribute Berks/Bucks & Oxon West | 8 | 7 | Grove RFC 1st XV |
| Counties 2 Tribute Berks/Bucks & Oxon West | 8 | 7 | Wallingford RFC 1st XV |
| Counties 2 Tribute Berks/Bucks & Oxon West | 8 | 7 | Witney RFC 2nd XV |
| Counties 3 Tribute Berks/Bucks & Oxon North | 9 | 9 | Banbury RUFC 3rd XV |
| Counties 3 Tribute Berks/Bucks & Oxon North | 9 | 9 | Didcot RFC 2nd XV |
| Counties 3 Tribute Berks/Bucks & Oxon North | 9 | 9 | Faringdon RFC 1st XV |
| Counties 3 Tribute Berks/Bucks & Oxon North | 9 | 9 | Gosford All Blacks RFC 2nd XV |
| Counties 3 Tribute Berks/Bucks & Oxon North | 9 | 9 | Littlemore RFC 1st XV |
| Counties 3 Tribute Berks/Bucks & Oxon North | 9 | 9 | Oxford Harlequins RFC 3rd XV |
| Counties 3 Tribute Berks/Bucks & Oxon North | 9 | 9 | Oxford RFC 2nd XV |
| Counties 3 Tribute Berks/Bucks & Oxon North | 9 | 9 | Wallingford RFC 2nd XV |
| Counties 3 Tribute Berks/Bucks & Oxon North | 9 | 9 | Witney RFC 3rd XV |
| Counties 3 Tribute Berks/Bucks & Oxon South | 9 | 1 | Henley Hawks 3rd XV |
| Counties 4 Tribute Berks/Bucks & Oxon North | 10 | 4 | Abingdon RFC 2nd XV |
| Counties 4 Tribute Berks/Bucks & Oxon North | 10 | 4 | Bicester RFC 2nd XV |
| Counties 4 Tribute Berks/Bucks & Oxon North | 10 | 4 | Chipping Norton RFC 2nd XV |
| Counties 4 Tribute Berks/Bucks & Oxon North | 10 | 4 | Grove RFC 2nd XV |

=== Cups ===
- Oxfordshire RFU County Cup – introduced in 1970, for local clubs at tiers 6–7 of the English rugby union system as well as 2nd teams for local clubs in higher divisions (tiers 3–4)
- Oxfordshire RFU County Shield

== See also ==
- Oxfordshire RFU County Cup
- Oxfordshire RFU County Shield
- South West Division
- English rugby union system
