= Buckinghamshire Rugby Football Union =

Buckinghamshire RFU
- Full name: Buckinghamshire Rugby Football Union
- Union: RFU
- Founded: 1949; 76 years ago
- Region: Buckinghamshire
Team kit

Official website
- bucksrfu.pitchero.com

The Buckinghamshire Rugby Football Union is the governing body for the sport of rugby union in the county of Buckinghamshire in England. The union is the constituent body of the Rugby Football Union (RFU) for Buckinghamshire, and administers and organises rugby union clubs and competitions in the county. It also administers the Buckinghamshire county rugby representative teams. The union was founded at a meeting at High Wycombe on 16 July 1949 during a drinking session at one of the founders house.

== Senior county team ==
Buckinghamshire has a county rugby team that has taken part in the County Championships since 1966. They currently play in Division 3 of the County Championship, and as of 2017 have yet to receive any county honours although they have reached several semi-finals in recent years. Bucks County Senior Women were promoted to the Division 1 after winning the Gill Burns Country Championship Division 2 title in 2018/19 season.

== Affiliated clubs ==
There are currently 16 clubs affiliated with the Buckinghamshire RFU, with teams at both senior and junior level.

- Amersham & Chiltern
- Aylesbury
- Beaconsfield
- Bletchley (Note: Bletchley are joint members of the Buckinghamshire RFU and East Midlands RFU.)
- Buckingham
- Chesham
- Drifters
- Farnham Royal
- High Wycombe
- Marlow
- Milton Keynes (Note: Milton Keynes are joint members of the Buckinghamshire RFU and East Midlands RFU.)
- Olney (Note: Olney are joint members of the Buckinghamshire RFU and East Midlands RFU.)
- Phoenix
- Risborough
- Slough
- Winslow

== County club competitions ==
The Buckinghamshire RFU currently helps run the following club competitions:

=== Leagues ===
Since 2000-01 the league system in this region is combined between three rugby football unions - Buckinghamshire, Berkshire and Oxfordshire. Prior to this Buckinghamshire and Oxfordshire had run a combined league, while Berkshire had been grouped with Dorset & Wilts. Currently there are several divisions for first teams in the region including:

- Berks/Bucks & Oxon Premier - league ranked at tier 8 of the English rugby union system
- Berks/Bucks & Oxon Championship - league ranked at tier 9

As well as leagues for second and third teams (currently no promotion into the English league system):

- Berks/Bucks & Oxon 1
- Berks/Bucks & Oxon 2
- Berks/Bucks & Oxon 3
- Berks/Bucks & Oxon 4 (North)/(South)

=== Discontinued competitions ===
In the past there were several cup competitions but these appear to have been discontinued since 2013.

- Buckinghamshire County Cup
- Buckinghamshire County Shield
- Buckinghamshire County Bowl
- Buckinghamshire County Vase

== See also ==
- South West Division
- English rugby union system
