= Berkshire Rugby Football Union =

Governing body of rugby union in Berkshire, England

Berkshire County RFU
- Sport: Rugby Union
- Jurisdiction: Berkshire, England
- Founded: 1931; 95 years ago
- Affiliation: RFU
- Chairman: Ian Wilson
- Secretary: Donna Clark

Official website
- berksrfu.com

The Berkshire Rugby Football Union is the governing body for the sport of rugby union in the county of Berkshire in England. The union is the constituent body of the Rugby Football Union (RFU) for Berkshire, and administers and organises rugby union clubs and competitions in the county. It also administers the Berkshire county rugby representative teams.

== History ==
Team kit

Although club sides had been existence in the county as early as the 1890s the Berkshire RFU did not form until 1931. A Berkshire representative side played the county's first competitive game in 1932 against Sussex but had to wait until January 1947 for the RFU to admit them to the County Championship, making their debut in the 1948 competition, where they reached the quarter-finals. In 1948 the Berkshire Society of Rugby Football Referees was formed by referees that lived locally, having previously belonged to the London Society, who had up until then also overseen games involving Berkshire clubs.

With the introduction of rugby union leagues in 1987, despite their closeness to London the majority of Berkshire clubs were placed in the south-west regional leagues, and up until the end of the century were grouped with Dorset and Wiltshire sides in a 3 tier Berks, Dorset & Wilts league. In 1994 Dennis Easby (D H Easby) became the first ever member of the Berkshire RFU to be elected as the president of the national RFU. Formerly of Redingensians, where he had been club captain, Easby held the top job for the 1994-95 season. He died in 2017. For the 2000-01 season, the RFU restructured the leagues and Berks clubs in the south-west regional leagues were instead grouped with clubs from Buckinghamshire and Oxfordshire.

== Senior county team ==
The Berkshire senior men's team currently play in Division 3 of the County Championship. Their best result was in 2002 when they reached the final of the County Championship Plate (then known as the Shield), losing 12-34 to Warwickshire in the final at Twickenham Stadium.

== Affiliated clubs ==
There are currently 16 clubs affiliated with the Berkshire RFU, with most teams having both senior and junior level teams with both boys and girls. 13 of these 16 clubs have voting rights - see notes below. The teams play in various competitive levels, from National 1 (Level 3) through to (Level 10) as well as IGR and social teams with most senior teams running between 1 and 4 teams.

- Aldermaston
- Berkshire Shire Hall
- Berkshire Unicorns (Note: Berkshire Unicorns are affiliated with the Berkshire RFU but have no voting rights.)
- Bracknell
- Crowthorne
- Hungerford
- Maidenhead
- Newbury Blues
- Rams
- Reading
- Reading Abbey
- Reading Renegades (Note: Reading Renegades are affiliated with the Berkshire RFU but have no voting rights.)
- Thatcham
- Tadley
- Thames Valley Police (Note: Thames Valley Police are affiliated with the Berkshire RFU but have no voting rights.)
- Windsor

== County club competitions ==
The Berkshire RFU currently helps run the following club competitions:

=== Leagues ===
Since 2000-01 the league system in this region is combined between three rugby football unions - Berkshire, Buckinghamshire and Oxfordshire. Currently there are several divisions for first teams in the region including:

- Berks/Bucks & Oxon Premier - league ranked at tier 8 of the English rugby union system
- Berks/Bucks & Oxon Championship - league ranked at tier 9

As well as leagues for second and third teams (currently no promotion into the English league system):

- Berks/Bucks & Oxon 1
- Berks/Bucks & Oxon 2
- Berks/Bucks & Oxon 3
- Berks/Bucks & Oxon 4 (North)/(South)

=== Cups ===
- Berkshire Cup
- Berkshire Plate
- Berkshire Vets Cup
- Berkshire Floodlit Sevens

In additions to senior men's cups, the Berkshire RFU county also run a woman's festival as well as a junior rugby competitions for clubs and schools (under-13 through to colts). Berkshire RFU also support the Reading Schools Rugby Competition (Un 12-16) as well as the Berkshire Schools Cup (which is run for ages U12 - U18)

== See also ==
- South West Division
- English rugby union system
