= Dorset and Wilts Rugby Football Union =

(England) Dorset & Wilts RFU
- Full name: Dorset and Wilts Rugby Football Union
- Union: RFU
- Founded: 1939; 86 years ago
- Region: Dorset, Wiltshire
- President: John Palmer
- Coach(es): Don Parsons
Team kit

Official website
- dwrugby.co.uk

Dorset and Wilts Rugby Football Union (Dorset & Wilts RFU) is the governing body for rugby union in the counties of Dorset and Wiltshire, England. Dorset & Wilts RFU is a Constituent Body of the Rugby Football Union (RFU) and is responsible for the management and administration of the game within the counties of Dorset and Wiltshire of all forms and at all levels. Originally Dorset and Wiltshire had their own county teams but would start to merge into one body towards the end of the 1930s, having already played a combined match against Hampshire in 1935–36 which Dorset & Wilts won 9–6. By 1939 Dorset & Wilts agreed to become a unified rugby football union to take part in the 1940–41 County Championships but this was postponed by the outbreak of World War II. After the war Dorset & Wilts played its first official county match in 1947 and attained full county status from the RFU in 1949.

== Role and responsibility ==
Dorset & Wilts RFU's role is to promote and develop rugby within Dorset and Wiltshire by supporting its clubs and encouraging all those who wish to participate including players, coaches, referees and administrators. It works in partnership with the RFU and liaises with local authorities and other county and regional organisations to achieve this. Its remit includes:

- Acting as a two-way link between the clubs and the RFU, it represents the interests of its member clubs regionally and nationally and provides the RFU with local knowledge of its clubs.
- Working with the Dorset and Wilts Schools' Union and the constituent clubs' development bodies to manage the rugby development of all players within the two counties.
- Working in partnership with the Dorset and Wilts Referees' Society to recruit, trains and develop club referees.
- Appointing welfare managers to provide leadership in the safeguarding of young people, to support club welfare officers and to assist clubs in the development of their welfare procedures.
- Administration all county competitions and the representative teams that take part in the County Championship, the National U20 Championship and County age grade competitions.
- Using the disciplinary powers it has been delegated by the RFU to act in relation to the infringement of any law of the game by players below National League level, or for any conduct prejudicial to the game or for infringement of most RFU or IRB regulations.
- Auditing rugby facilities and producing plans to identify and prioritise club projects.
- Assisting and supporting proposals to develop Club facilities in partnership with the South West RFU.

To help achieve these aims it holds an annual conference for club officials and manages and administrates specific RFU projects including RFU funded campaigns to help clubs recruit and retain players, coaches and administrators. It also nominates candidates and tutors from its Clubs to attend the regional RFU leadership academy.

D&WRFU has a strategic plan supported by annual action plans and works with the RFU to:

- Increase the number of players, particularly those aged 16 and above
- Increase the number of matches being played
- Improve the sustainability of its clubs
- Increase the number of effective people supporting the playing of the game.

== Badge and colours ==
The blazon for the Dorset and Wilts RFU arms are; vert, an orle argent per fess (at nombril point), three lions passant guardant in pale argent, a bustard wings elevated and addorsed also argent. The arms are generally shown on a shield described either as a badge or elegant.

The green and white colour of the arms and playing kit are taken from the arms of the Wiltshire County Council which were chosen to represent the white chalk and green grass of the North Wessex Downs. The three lions representing Dorset are derived from the old seal of Dorchester (the county town) which had borne the former royal arms of England; these are placed in a superior position to the Wiltshire bustard in order to compensate for the use of Wiltshire's colours (the colours from the Flag of Dorset are not represented as it was only adopted by the county in 2008, long after the formation of the Dorset and Wilts RFU, though it could now be argued that the white represents Dorset and the green stands for Wiltshire). The bustard represents Wiltshire because it was in this county that the bird was last seen in the late 1890s before being declared extinct in the United Kingdom (the great bustard was adopted as the crest of Wiltshire in recognition of this fact) and it is on Salisbury Plain in Wiltshire that efforts are currently under way to reintroduce the species.

== Twin counties sides ==
Home	Away

=== Senior men's side ===
The senior side regularly enters the RFU's County Championship Division 3 and have won it on three occasions, in 2010, 2011 and 2018.

In 2010 the Twin Counties won two of their three pool matches against Berkshire, Buckinghamshire and Sussex, and then defeated Oxfordshire in the semi-final. They defeated Leicestershire 36–26 scoring five tries to only one conceded at Twickenham on 30 May 2010. Leicestershire had booked their finals spot with a 37–35 victory over Cumbria.

2010 final team

- K Lynch (Bournemouth RFC)
- S Lilley (Sherborne RFC)
- T Gilmour (Salisbury RFC)
- S Chislett (Bournemouth RFC) – 1 try (5 points)
- M Pope (Bournemouth RFC) – 1 try (5 points)
- A Westall (Swindon RFC) – 4 conversions, 1 penalty (11 points)
- H Bell (Oakmeadians RFC)
- R West (Salisbury RFC)
- F Wilford (Bournemouth RFC, capt)
- A Manning (Bournemouth RFC)
- M Pallas (Salisbury RFC)
- L Gilbert (Chinnor RFC) – 1 try (5 points)
- S Barwick (Salisbury RFC) – 1 try (5 points)
- J Stephenson (Wimborne RFC)
- J Sanders (Ellingham & Ringwood RFC)

Replacements:

- J Burns (Bournemouth RFC) – 1 try (5 points)
- B Saville (Swindon RFC)
- T Mannion (Swindon RFC)
- M Richards (Oakmeadians RFC)
- J Mitchell (Oakmeadians RFC)
- D Bell (Salisbury RFC)
- T Pottage (Salisbury RFC)

In the 2011 competition they beat Berkshire 33–22 and Oxfordshire 54–12 in the pool matches. They then beat Essex 61–37 in the semi-final and won the final at Twickenham on Sunday 29 May 2011, beating Surrey 43–22.

2011 final team

- Simon Lilley (Bournemouth RFC)
- Thomas Pottage (Salisbury RFC)
- Sean Lilley (Oldfield Old Boys RFC)
- Scott Chislett (Bournemouth RFC) – 1 try (5 points)
- Christian Novik (Chippenham RFC)
- Adam Westall (Swindon RFC, capt) – 1 try, 5 conversions, 1 penalty (18 points)
- Sam Hardcastle (Bournemouth RFC)
- Tom Dunn (Chippenham RFC)
- Frazer Wilford (Bournemouth RFC)
- Alan Manning (Bournemouth RFC)
- Robert Lyons (Chippenham RFC)
- Liam Gilbert (Salisbury RFC)
- Sean Barwick (Salisbury RFC) (yellow card) 31' to 41'
- Fraser Clilverd (Cleve RFC) (yellow card) 49' to 59' – 1 try (5 points)
- Jack Hennings (Bournemouth RFC)

Replacements:

- Luke Esnouf (Salisbury RFC)
- Sean Jones (Trowbridge RFC)
- David Thorpe (Salisbury RFC)
- Tom Baldwin (Chippenham RFC) – 1 try (5 points)
- James Mitchell (Oakmedians RFC)
- Terry Gilmour (Salisbury RFC)
- Lewis Warner (Wimborne RFC) – 1 try (5 points)

=== Under 20 side ===
In 2011 the Dorset and Wilts U20 side played 4 and won 3 in the U20 County Championship competition. They beat Berkshire 21–15, then Oxfordshire 21–32 and Buckinghamshire 0–36 before losing 58–10 to Gloucestershire in the quarter-finals.

== Affiliated clubs ==
There are currently 51 clubs affiliated with the Dorset & Wilts RFU, most of which have teams at both senior and junior level. Although several teams from Somerset play in the Dorset & Wilts regional leagues, these sides are still members of the Somerset RFU.

- Aldbourne Dabchicks
- Anglo-European College Of Chiropractors
- Blandford
- Bournemouth
- Bournemouth University
- Bradford-on-Avon
- Bridport
- Calne
- Chippenham
- Cooper Avon Tyres
- Colerne
- Corsham
- Cricklade
- Devizes
- Dorchester
- Dorset Dockers
- Dorset Police
- East Dorset
- Frome Valley Lions
- Lytchett Minster
- Malmesbury
- Marlborough
- Minety
- Motorola Swindon
- Nationwide (Swindon)
- North Dorset
- Oakmeadians
- Pewsey Vale
- Poole
- Puddletown
- Royal Wootton Bassett
- Salisbury
- South Wilts
- Sherborne
- Sherborne Pilgrims
- Supermarine
- Sutton Benger
- Swanage & Wareham
- Swindon
- Swindon College Old Boys
- The Armour Centre
- Trowbridge
- Warminster
- Warminster Training Centre
- Westbury
- Weymouth
- Wheatsheaf Cabin Crew
- Wiltshire College
- Wiltshire Fire Brigade
- Wiltshire Police
- Wimborne

== Senior County Club Competitions ==
Since 2001–02 the league system in this region has been contested by clubs from Dorset and Wiltshire (as well as the occasional team from Somerset) and is run by the Dorset & Wilts RFU. Prior to this clubs from Berkshire had also taken part but they now play in a league with clubs from Buckinghamshire and Oxfordshire. Currently there are several regional divisions which combine 1st, 2nd, 3rd and even 4th teams in the region including:

=== League ===
- Dorset & Wilts 1 North / Dorset & Wilts 1 South – tier 8 leagues for teams from Wiltshire (north) or Dorset (south)
- Dorset & Wilts 2 North / Dorset & Wilts 2 South – tier 9 leagues
- Dorset & Wilts 3 North / Dorset & Wilts 3 South – tier 10 leagues

=== Cups ===
There are a number of cups for the first teams of clubs based in Dorset and Wiltshire run by the Dorset & Wilts RFU including:

- Dorset & Wilts Senior Cup
- Dorset & Wilts Senior Vase
- Dorset & Wilts Senior Plate

Additionally there are cup and plate competitions for 2nd teams in the region as well as a cup competition for 3rd teams.

=== Discontinued Competitions ===
- Berks/Dorset/Wilts 3 East – a league involving Berkshire, Dorset and Wiltshire clubs that ran between 1988 and 1992 and was at tier 10 of the English rugby union system
- Dorset & Wilts 3 West – a tier 10 league mostly for Dorset clubs that ran for two spells; 1988–1992 (as Berks/Dorset/Wilts 3 West) and 2006–09 (as Dorset & Wilts 3 West)
- Dorset & Wilts 4 – a tier 11 league that ran between 2011 and 2016. The division contained mostly 2nd, 3rd and 4th teams based in both Dorset and Wiltshire.

== Colts County Club Competitions ==
At colts level (under 18) there is an annual league and knockout cup competition.

=== Colts cup competition ===
Preliminary matches are usually played in January and February with the finals taking place in mid-April. At each stage only the winners of each match progress to get to the cup final match. There are two consolation matches, the plate final (to determine third and fourth place) and the bowl final. Trophies are presented to the winning team of each of the three final matches and individual medals to the winners of the cup final.

Due to RFU restrictions on playing time at Under 18 level, no extra time will be played in the event of a tied match.

- In preliminary matches the away side go through
- In the finals, the winner is (in order until a winner is found);
  - the side that has scored the most tries
  - the side that has scored the most goals (converted tries)
  - the side that scored (any points, not necessarily a try) first
  - in the event of no score, the trophy is shared

History of the Colts cup competition

Year	Winners	Runners-up
2000–2001	Swanage & Wareham RFC	Chippenham
2001–2002	Chippenham RFC	Swanage & Wareham
2002–2003	Chippenham RFC	North Dorset RFC
2003–2004	Chippenham RFC	Wimborne
2004–2005	Wootton Bassett RFC	Wimborne
2005–2006	Salisbury RFC	Wimborne
2006–2007	Bournemouth RFC	Chippenham
2007–2008	Salisbury RFC	Wimborne
2008–2009	Wimborne RFC	Bournemouth
2009–2010	Sherborne RFC	North Dorset
2010–2011	Sherborne RFC	Salisbury
2011–2012	Sherborne RFC	Wimborne
2012–2013		
2013–2014	Sherborne RFC	Bournemouth
2014–2015		
2015–2016		
2016–2017		
2017–2018		

== See also ==
- South West Division
- English rugby union system
