= Counties 4 Berks/Bucks & Oxon =

English rugby union league

- Current season or competition: 2024-25 Counties 4 Berks/Bucks & Oxon
- Sport: Rugby union
- Instituted: 2004; 22 years ago
- Country: England
- Most titles: Amersham & Chiltern III (2 titles)
- Website: englandrugby.com

Counties 4 Berks/Bucks & Oxon (formerly Berks, Bucks and Oxon Division 2) is an English rugby union league featuring teams from Berkshire, Buckinghamshire and Oxfordshire.

The division was created in 2004–05 as part of a complete overhaul of the Berks/Bucks & Oxon league, with a large number of 2nd, 3rd and 4th teams entering at various levels, and was divided into north and south regions, becoming the third division of the league structure with promoted teams going into Berks/Bucks & Oxon 1 and there being no relegation.

Further league restructuring in 2011 saw Berks/Bucks & Oxon 2 become one league instead of two regional divisions and newly created divisions below it meant that relegation was introduced. Changes above the division meant that 1st teams were split from 2nd, 3rd and 4th teams and Berks/Bucks & Oxon 1 was the highest level that teams in Berks/Bucks & Oxon 2 and below could reach in the system.

Following the RFU Adult Competition Review the structure changed once more with reserve teams and first teams competing in the same leagues, the competition administered centrally rather than by county constituent bodies and a North / South divisional split. A Central division was added ahead of season 2024–25. Promotion is to Counties 3 Berks/Bucks & Oxon (North) or Counties 3 Berks/Bucks & Oxon (South) depending on location. Relegation is to the merit leagues.

== 2026-27 ==
Chinnor IV (champions) and Reading III (5th) were promoted from the Central division to Counties 3 Berks/Bucks & Oxon (North) and Counties 3 Berks/Bucks & Oxon (South) respectively. Aylesbury II (4th) and Littlemore (3rd) were level transferred into the North division while Reading Abbey III (runners-up) did not return for the new season.

After ten rounds the competition will split into a Cup, Plate and Shield with the teams ranked 1st and 2nd in the North and South leagues entering the Cup, 3rd and 4th contesting the Plate while 5th and 6th will meet in the Shield. Each club will therefore have an additional six fixtures.

=== North ===
Departing were Aylesbury II, Didcot II and Littlemore promoted to Counties 3 Berks/Bucks & Oxon (North) as the top three respectively.

Also departing were Swindon College Old Boys II (5th).

Team	Ground	Capacity	Town/Village	Previous season
Abingdon II	Southern Sports Park		Abingdon, Oxfordshire	6th
Aylesbury III	Ostler's Field		Weston Turville, Aylesbury, Buckinghamshire	Re-entry
Bicester II	Oxford Road		Bicester, Oxfordshire	Relegated from Counties 3 BBO (North)
Bletchley II	Manor Fields		Bletchley, Milton Keynes, Buckinghamshire	New entry
Chipping Norton II	Greystones		Chipping Norton, Oxfordshire	Relegated from Counties 3 BBO (North)
Grove II	Cane Lane		Grove, Oxfordshire	4th

Locations of the 2026-27 Counties 4 Berks/Bucks & Oxon (North) team

=== South ===
Departing were Tadley II and Crowthorne promoted to Counties 3 Berks/Bucks & Oxon (South)

Team	Ground	Capacity	Town/Village	Previous season
Beaconsfield III	Oak Lodge Meadow		Beaconsfield, Buckinghamshire	New entry
Bracknell IV	Lily Hill Park		Bracknell, Berkshire	3rd
Harwell	Harwell Science and Innovation Campus		Didcot, Oxfordshire	Relegated from Counties 3 BBO (North)
Henley III	Dry Leas		Henley-on-Thames, Oxfordshire	(Double) Relegated from Counties 2 BBO (East)
Hungerford II	Triangle Field		Hungerford, Berkshire	6th
Thatcham II	Henwicky Worthy Sports Field		Thatcham, Berkshire	4th
Windsor III	Home Park		Windsor, Berkshire	5th

Locations of the 2026-27 Counties 4 Berks/Bucks & Oxon (South) teams in Berkshire

== 2025–26 ==
For the new season the league was consolidated back to two divisions with the Central division being dispensed with.

Chinnor IV (champions) and Reading III (5th) were promoted from the Central division to Counties 3 Berks/Bucks & Oxon (North) and Counties 3 Berks/Bucks & Oxon (South) respectively. Aylesbury II (4th) and Littlemore (3rd) were level transferred into the North division while Reading Abbey III (runners-up) did not return for the new season.

After ten rounds the competition will split into a Cup, Plate and Shield with the teams ranked 1st and 2nd in the North and South leagues entering the Cup, 3rd and 4th contesting the Plate while 5th and 6th will meet in the Shield. Each club will therefore have an additional six fixtures.

=== North ===
Departing were Gosford All Blacks II, Banbury III and Chipping Norton II promoted to Counties 3 Berks/Bucks & Oxon (North) as the top three respectively.

Aylesbury III (4th in Central) withdrew and their place taken by Aylesbury II.

Team	Ground	Capacity	Town/Village	Previous season
Abingdon II	Southern Sports Park		Abingdon, Oxfordshire	5th (North)
Aylesbury II	Ostler's Field		Weston Turville, Aylesbury, Buckinghamshire	New entry
Didcot II	Boundary Park		Didcot, Oxfordshire	4th (North)
Grove II	Cane Lane		Grove, Oxfordshire	Re-entry
Littlemore	Northfield Close		Littlemore, Oxfordshire	Level transfer from Central (3rd)
Swindon College Old Boys II	Nationwide Sports Pavilion		Swindon, Wiltshire	Relegated from Counties 3 Dorset & Wilts North (6th)

Locations of the 2025-26 Counties 4 Berks/Bucks & Oxon (North) team

=== South ===
There was no promotion from the South league.

Crowthorne re-joined the pyramid having withdrawn from Counties 2 Berks/Bucks & Oxon in season 2024-25.

Team	Ground	Capacity	Town/Village	Previous season
Bracknell IV	Lily Hill Park		Bracknell, Berkshire	2nd
Crowthorne	New Nest		Crowthorne, Berkshire	Re-entry
Hungerford II	Triangle Field		Hungerford, Berkshire	5th
Tadley II	Red Lane		Aldermaston, Berkshire	3rd
Thatcham II	Henwicky Worthy Sports Field		Thatcham, Berkshire	4th
Windsor III	Home Park		Windsor, Berkshire	1st

Locations of the 2025-26 Counties 4 Berks/Bucks & Oxon (South) teams in Berkshire

== 2024–25 ==
For the new season the league was further sub-divided into three five-club competitions with the addition of a Central division.

=== North ===
Departing were Harwell and Bicester II, promoted to Counties 3 Berks/Bucks & Oxon (North). Grove II (3rd) did not return for the new campaign. Chinnor IV (4th) and Littlemore (6th) were level transferred to the new Central division.

Team	Ground	Capacity	Town/Village	Previous season
Abingdon II	Southern Sports Park		Abingdon, Oxfordshire	Relegated from Counties 3 Berks/Bucks & Oxon (North)
Banbury III	Bodicote Park		Banbury, Oxfordshire	Relegated from Counties 3 Berks/Bucks & Oxon (North)
Chipping Norton II	Greystones		Chipping Norton, Oxfordshire	New entry
Didcot II	Boundary Park		Didcot, Oxfordshire	7th
Gosford All Blacks II	Stratfield Brake		Kidlington, Oxfordshire	5th

Locations of the 2024-25 Counties 4 Berks/Bucks & Oxon (North) teams in Oxfordshire

=== Central ===
Team	Ground	Capacity	Town/Village	Previous season
Aylesbury III	Ostler's Field		Weston Turville, Aylesbury, Buckinghamshire	New entry
Chinnor IV	Kingsey Road	2,000	Thame, Oxfordshire	4th (North)
Littlemore	Northfield Close		Littlemore, Oxfordshire	6th (North)
Reading III	Holme Park		Sonning, Reading, Berkshire	4th (South)
Reading Abbey III	Rosehill		Reading, Berkshire	New entry

Locations of the 2024-25 Counties 4 Berks/Bucks & Oxon (Central) teams

=== South ===
Departing were Reading Abbey II, Berkshire Shire Hall and High Wycombe II, all promoted to Counties 3 Berks/Bucks & Oxon (South). Reading III (4th) were level transferred to the new Central division.

Team	Ground	Capacity	Town/Village	Previous season
Bracknell IV	Lily Hill Park		Bracknell, Berkshire	5th
Hungerford II	Triangle Field		Hungerford, Berkshire	6th
Tadley II	Red Lane		Aldermaston, Berkshire	Relegated from Counties 3 Berks/Bucks & Oxon (South)
Thatcham II	Henwicky Worthy Sports Field		Thatcham, Berkshire	7th
Windsor III	Home Park		Windsor, Berkshire	New entry

Locations of the 2024-25 Counties 4 Berks/Bucks & Oxon (South) teams in Berkshire

== 2023–24 ==
=== North ===
Departing were Stow-on-the-Wold II, promoted to Counties 3 Berks/Bucks & Oxon (North) as runners-up behind champions Tring III who were not promoted but instead returned to merit league competition.

Team	Ground	Capacity	Town/Village	Previous season
Bicester II	Oxford Road		Bicester, Oxfordshire	3rd
Chinnor IV	Kingsey Road	2,000	Thame, Oxfordshire	5th
Didcot II	Boundary Park		Didcot, Oxfordshire	Relegated from Counties 3 Berks/Bucks & Oxon (North)
Gosford All Blacks II	Stratfield Brake		Kidlington, Oxfordshire	7th
Grove II	Cane Lane		Grove, Oxfordshire	Relegated from Counties 3 Berks/Bucks & Oxon (North)
Harwell	Harwell Science and Innovation Campus		Didcot, Oxfordshire	4th
Littlemore	Northfield Close		Littlemore, Oxfordshire	6th

Locations of the 2023-24 Counties 4 Berks/Bucks & Oxon (North) teams in Oxfordshire

=== South ===
Departing were Farnham Royal, promoted to Counties 3 Berks/Bucks & Oxon (South) as runners-up behind Drifters as champions who were not promoted but instead returned to merit league competition as did Phoenix II (7th).

Team	Ground	Capacity	Town/Village	Previous season
Berkshire Shire Hall	Berkshire County Sports Club		Sonning, Reading, Berkshire	3rd
Bracknell IV	Lily Hill Park		Bracknell, Berkshire	6th
High Wycombe II	Kingsmead Road		High Wycombe, Buckinghamshire	Relegated from Counties 3 Berks/Bucks & Oxon (South)
Hungerford II	Triangle Field		Hungerford, Berkshire	5th
Reading III	Holme Park		Sonning, Reading, Berkshire	New entry
Reading Abbey II	Rosehill		Reading, Berkshire	Relegated from Counties 3 Berks/Bucks & Oxon (South)
Thatcham II	Henwicky Worthy Sports Field		Thatcham, Berkshire	4th

Locations of the 2023-24 Counties 4 Berks/Bucks & Oxon (South) teams in Berkshire & Buckinghamshire

== 2022–23 ==
This was the first season following the RFU Adult Competition Review.

=== North ===
Team	Ground	Capacity	Town/Village	Previous season
Bicester II	Oxford Road		Bicester, Oxfordshire	
Chinnor IV	Kingsey Road	2,000	Thame, Oxfordshire	
Gosford All Blacks II	Stratfield Brake		Kidlington, Oxfordshire	
Harwell	Harwell Science and Innovation Campus		Didcot, Oxfordshire	
Littlemore	Northfield Close		Littlemore, Oxfordshire	
Stow-on-the-Wold II	Oddington Road		Stow-on-the-Wold, Gloucestershire	
Tring III	Pendley Sports Centre		Tring, Hertfordshire	

Locations of the 2022-23 Counties 4 Berks/Bucks & Oxon (North) teams in Oxfordshire, Hertfordshire & Gloucestershire

=== South ===
Team	Ground	Capacity	Town/Village	Previous season
Berkshire Shire Hall	Berkshire County Sports Club		Sonning, Reading, Berkshire	
Bracknell IV	Lily Hill Park		Bracknell, Berkshire	
Drifters	Farnham Common		Farnham Common, Buckinghamshire	
Farnham Royal	Farnham Royal Playing Fields		Slough, Berkshire	
Hungerford II	Triangle Field		Hungerford, Berkshire	
Phoenix II	The Sports Ground		Taplow, Buckinghamshire	
Thatcham II	Henwicky Worthy Sports Field		Thatcham, Berkshire	

Locations of the 2022-23 Counties 4 Berks/Bucks & Oxon (South) teams in Berkshire & Buckinghamshire

== 2017–22 ==
Contested (2020-21 aside) but not as an RFU administered league.

== Participating clubs 2016–17 ==
- Beaconsfield II
- Buckingham II
- Henley III
- High Wycombe II
- Marlow II
- Newbury II
- Oxford Harlequins II
- Redingensians IV
- Windsor III
- Witney III

== Participating clubs 2012–13 ==
- Alchester II
- Aylesbury II
- Bicester II
- Bletchley II
- Buckingham II
- Oxford Harlequins II
- Reading Abbey II
- Tadley II
- Wallingford II
- Witney III

== Berks/Bucks & Oxon 2 North Honours ==
Berks/Bucks & Oxon 2 North Honours
Season	No of Teams	Champions	Runners–up	Relegated Teams	League Name
2004-05	10	Witney III	Buckingham III	No relegation	Berks/Bucks & Oxon 2 North
2005-06	11	Buckingham III	Witney IV	No relegation	Berks/Bucks & Oxon 2 North
2006-07	12	Banbury II	Amersham & Chiltern III, Gosford All Blacks II	No relegation	Berks/Bucks & Oxon 2 North
2007-08	9	Bicester II	High Wycombe III	No relegation	Berks/Bucks & Oxon 2 North
2008-09	9	Amersham & Chiltern III	Chinnor IV	No relegation	Berks/Bucks & Oxon 2 North
2009-10	10	Risborough	Chipping Norton II	No relegation	Berks/Bucks & Oxon 2 North
2010-11	11	Bletchley II (Note: Transferred to Berks/Bucks & Oxon 2.)	Maidenhead IV (Note: Transferred to Berks/Bucks & Oxon 3.)	No relegation	Berks/Bucks & Oxon 2 North (Note: The Berks/Bucks & Oxon league would be completely restructured the following season. 1st teams in this division would transfer to Berks/Bucks & Oxon Championship while 2nd/3rd/4th teams would transfer to Berks/Bucks & Oxon 2, Berks/Bucks & Oxon 3 or Berks/Bucks & Oxon 4 depending on league position.)
Green backgrounds are promotion places.

== Berks/Bucks & Oxon 2 South Honours ==
Berks/Bucks & Oxon 2 South Honours
Season	No of Teams	Champions	Runners–up	Relegated Teams	League Name
2004-05	10	Oxford Harlequins IV	Didcot	No relegation	Berks/Bucks & Oxon 2 South
2005-06	11	Aldermaston	Slough II	No relegation	Berks/Bucks & Oxon 2 South
2006-07	11	Tadley II	Wallingford II	No relegation	Berks/Bucks & Oxon 2 South
2007-08	9	Hungerford	Littlemore	No relegation	Berks/Bucks & Oxon 2 South
2008-09	9	Reading II	Redingensians III, Farnham Royal (also promoted)	No relegation	Berks/Bucks & Oxon 2 South
2009-10	10	Thatcham II	Phoenix II	No relegation	Berks/Bucks & Oxon 2 South
2010-11	12	Berkshire Shire Hall (Note: Transferred to Berks/Bucks & Oxon Championship.)	Kingsclere II	No relegation	Berks/Bucks & Oxon 2 South (Note: The Berks/Bucks & Oxon league would be completely restructured the following season. 1st teams in this division would transfer to Berks/Bucks & Oxon Championship while 2nd/3rd/4th teams would transfer to Berks/Bucks & Oxon 3, Berks/Bucks & Oxon 4 or Berks/Bucks & Oxon 5 depending on league position.)
Green backgrounds are promotion places.

== Berks/Bucks & Oxon 2 Honours ==
Berks/Bucks & Oxon 2 Honours
Season	No of Teams	Champions	Runners–up	Relegated Teams	League Name
2011-12	10	High Wycombe II	Redingensians IV	Henley IV, Maidenhead III	Berks/Bucks & Oxon 2
2012-13	10	Buckingham II	Witney III	Tadley II, Alchester II, Aylesbury II	Berks/Bucks & Oxon 2
2013-14	12	Amersham & Chiltern III	Oxford Harlequins III	Wallingford II, Grove II, Bicester II	Berks/Bucks & Oxon 2
2014-15	11	Thatcham II	Aylesbury II	Windsor III, Drifters II	Berks/Bucks & Oxon 2
2015-16	9	Windsor II	Reading Abbey II	Tadley II, Beaconsfield II	Berks/Bucks & Oxon 2
2016-17	10	Henley III	Newbury II	Windsor III, Oxford Harlequins II	Berks/Bucks & Oxon 2
2017-18	10				
Green backgrounds are promotion places.

== See also ==
- Berkshire RFU
- Buckinghamshire RFU
- Oxfordshire RFU
- English rugby union system
- Rugby union in England
