= Counties 3 Berks/Bucks & Oxon =

Rugby union competition in England

- Current season or competition: 2024-25 Counties 3 Berks/Bucks & Oxon
- Sport: Rugby union
- Instituted: 2004; 22 years ago
- Country: England
- Most titles: Bracknell III (3 titles)
- Website: englandrugby.com

Counties 3 Berks/Bucks & Oxon (formerly Berks, Bucks and Oxon Division 1) is an English rugby union league featuring teams from Berkshire, Buckinghamshire and Oxfordshire.

The division was created in 2004–05 as part of a complete overhaul of the Berks/Bucks & Oxon league, with a large number of 2nd, 3rd and 4th teams entering at various levels, and was divided into north and south regions, with the original Berks/Bucks & Oxon 1 division becoming the Berks/Bucks & Oxon Premier and Berks/Bucks & Oxon 1 becoming, in effect, division 2 of the system. Rather confusingly promoted 1st teams would go up into the Berks/Bucks & Oxon Premier while 2nd, 3rd and 4th teams would move into Berks/Bucks & Oxon Premier A.

The league would be restructured further in 2011–12 with the re-introduction of a new tier 2 competition - the Berks/Bucks & Oxon Championship and the cancellation of Berks/Bucks & Oxon Premier A. This meant that Berks/Bucks & Oxon 1 (now merged into one league instead of two regional ones) would be for lower teams and below only with no chance of promotion to a higher league (although relegation was still possible).

Following the RFU Adult Competition Review the structure changed once more with reserve teams and first teams competing in the same leagues, the competition administered centrally rather than by county constituent bodies and a North / South divisional split. Promotion is to Counties 2 Berks/Bucks & Oxon (North) or Counties 2 Berks/Bucks & Oxon (South) depending on location. Relegation is to Counties 4 Berks/Bucks & Oxon (North) or Counties 4 Berks/Bucks & Oxon (South) again depending on location.

== 2026-27 ==
=== North ===
Departing were Chinnor IV (champions) and Stow-on-the-Wold II (runners-up) promoted to Counties 2 Berks/Bucks & Oxon (East) and Counties 2 Berks/Bucks & Oxon (West) respectively. Bicester II (9th) and Harwell (10th) were relegated.

Team	Ground	Capacity	Town/Village	Previous season
Aylesbury II	Ostler's Field		Weston Turville, Aylesbury, Buckinghamshire	Promoted from Counties 4 BBO (North)
Banbury III	Bodicote Park		Banbury, Oxfordshire	6th
Buckingham II	Floyd Field		Maids Moreton, Buckingham, Buckinghamshire	3rd
Didcot II	Boundary Park		Didcot, Oxfordshire	Promoted from Counties 4 BBO (North)
Faringdon	Folly Sports Park		Faringdon, Oxfordshire	Relegated from Counties 2 BBO (West)
Gosford All Blacks II	Stratfield Brake		Kidlington, Oxfordshire	7th
Littlemore	Northfield Close		Littlemore, Oxfordshire	Promoted from Counties 4 BBO (North)
Oxford II	North Hinksey Park		North Hinksey, Oxford, Oxfordshire	8th
Oxford Harlequins III	Horspath Sports Ground		Horspath, Oxfordshire	4th
Wallingford II	Wallingford Sports Park		Wallingford, Oxfordshire	Level transfer from South (7th)
Witney III	Hailey Road		Witney, Oxfordshire	5th

Locations of the 2026-27 Counties 3 Berks/Bucks & Oxon (North) teams in Oxfordshire & Buckinghamshire

=== South ===
Departing were Windsor II (champions) and High Wycombe II (runners-up) both promoted to Counties 2 Berks/Bucks & Oxon (East).

Also leaving were Wallingford II (7th) on a level transfer to the North division.

Team	Ground	Capacity	Town/Village	Previous season
Aldermaston	Recreational Society		Aldermaston, Berkshire	3rd
Berkshire Shire Hall	Berkshire County Sports Club		Sonning, Reading, Berkshire	4th
Bracknell III	Lily Hill Park		Bracknell, Berkshire	Relegated from Counties 2 BBO (East)
Crowthorne	New Nest		Crowthorne, Berkshire	Promoted from Counties 4 BBO (South)
Farnham Royal	Farnham Royal Playing Fields		Slough, Berkshire	5th
Newbury II	Monks Lane		Newbury, Berkshire	Relegated from Counties 2 BBO (West)
Phoenix	The Sports Ground		Taplow, Buckinghamshire	8th
Reading III	Holme Park		Sonning, Reading, Berkshire	9th
Reading Abbey II	Rosehill		Reading, Berkshire	6th
Tadley II	Red Lane		Aldermaston, Berkshire	Promoted from Counties 4 BBO (South)
Thatcham	Henwicky Worthy Sports Field		Thatcham, Berkshire	10th

Locations of the 2026-27 Counties 3 Berks/Bucks & Oxon (South) teams in Berkshire

== 2025-26 ==
=== North ===
Departing were Banbury II (champions) and Risborough (runners-up) promoted to Counties 2 Berks/Bucks & Oxon (North) and Counties 2 Berks/Bucks & Oxon (South) respectively. Also leaving were Wallingford II on a level transfer to the South division.

Chipping Norton II (promoted from Counties 4 Berks/Bucks & Oxon (North) in season 2024-25) started but did not complete the season leaving ten clubs to contest the outstanding fixtures.

Team	Ground	Capacity	Town/Village	Previous season
Banbury III	Bodicote Park		Banbury, Oxfordshire	Promoted from Counties 4 Berks/Bucks & Oxon (North) (champions)
Bicester II	Oxford Road		Bicester, Oxfordshire	10th
Buckingham II	Floyd Field		Maids Moreton, Buckingham, Buckinghamshire	4th
Chinnor IV	Kingsey Road	2,000	Thame, Oxfordshire	Promoted from Counties 4 Berks/Bucks & Oxon (Central)
Gosford All Blacks II	Stratfield Brake		Kidlington, Oxfordshire	Promoted from Counties 4 Berks/Bucks & Oxon (North)
Harwell	Harwell Science and Innovation Campus		Didcot, Oxfordshire	8th
Oxford II	North Hinksey Park		North Hinksey, Oxford, Oxfordshire	9th
Oxford Harlequins III	Horspath Sports Ground		Horspath, Oxfordshire	3rd
Stow-on-the-Wold II	Oddington Road		Stow-on-the-Wold, Gloucestershire	7th
Witney III	Hailey Road		Witney, Oxfordshire	6th

Locations of the 2025-26 Counties 3 Berks/Bucks & Oxon (North) teams in Oxfordshire & Gloucestershire

=== South ===
Departing were Henley III (champions), Bracknell III (runners-up) and Reading II (4th) all promoted to Counties 2 Berks/Bucks & Oxon (South).

Team	Ground	Capacity	Town/Village	Previous season
Aldermaston	Recreational Society		Aldermaston, Berkshire	7th
Berkshire Shire Hall	Berkshire County Sports Club		Sonning, Reading, Berkshire	6th
Farnham Royal	Farnham Royal Playing Fields		Slough, Berkshire	11th
High Wycombe II	Kingsmead Road		High Wycombe, Buckinghamshire	5th
Phoenix	The Sports Ground		Taplow, Buckinghamshire	10th
Reading III	Holme Park		Sonning, Reading, Berkshire	Promoted from Counties 4 Berks/Bucks & Oxon (Central) (5th)
Reading Abbey II	Rosehill		Reading, Berkshire	9th
Thatcham	Henwicky Worthy Sports Field		Thatcham, Berkshire	Relegated from Counties 2 Berks/Bucks & Oxon (South)
Wallingford II	Wallingford Sports Park		Wallingford, Oxfordshire	Level transfer from North divisiton (5th)
Windsor II	Home Park		Windsor, Berkshire	3rd

Locations of the 2025-26 Counties 3 Berks/Bucks & Oxon (South) teams in Buckinghamshire & Oxfordshire
Locations of the 2025-26 Counties 3 Berks/Bucks & Oxon (South) teams in Berkshire

== 2024–25 ==
=== North ===
Departing were Faringdon, promoted to Counties 2 Berks/Bucks & Oxon (North). Abingdon II (8th) and Banbury III (10th) were relegated to Counties 4 Berks/Bucks & Oxon (North).

Aylesbury II (2nd in 2023–24) were initially placed in the league but withdrew, their place taken by Oxford II.

Team	Ground	Capacity	Town/Village	Previous season
Banbury II	Bodicote Park		Banbury, Oxfordshire	Relegated from Counties 2 Berks/Bucks & Oxon (North)
Bicester II	Oxford Road		Bicester, Oxfordshire	Promoted from Counties 4 Berks/Bucks & Oxon (North) (runners-up)
Buckingham II	Floyd Field		Maids Moreton, Buckingham, Buckinghamshire	7th
Harwell	Harwell Science and Innovation Campus		Didcot, Oxfordshire	Promoted from Counties 4 Berks/Bucks & Oxon (North) (champions)
Oxford II	North Hinksey Park		North Hinksey, Oxford, Oxfordshire	New entry
Oxford Harlequins III	Horspath Sports Ground		Horspath, Oxfordshire	Relegated from Counties 2 Berks/Bucks & Oxon (North)
Risborough	Princes Risborough School		Princes Risborough, Buckinghamshire	3rd
Stow-on-the-Wold II	Oddington Road		Stow-on-the-Wold, Gloucestershire	6th
Wallingford II	Wallingford Sports Park		Wallingford, Oxfordshire	4th
Witney III	Hailey Road		Witney, Oxfordshire	5th

Locations of the 2024-25 Counties 3 Berks/Bucks & Oxon (North) teams in Oxfordshire & Gloucestershire
Locations of the 2024-25 Counties 3 Berks/Bucks & Oxon teams (North) in Buckinghamshire

=== South ===
Departing were Amersham & Chiltern II (champions) and Marlow II (3rd) promoted to Counties 2 Berks/Bucks & Oxon (South). Henley III finished as runners-up but could not be promoted into a league already featuring Henley II. Tadley II (10th) were relegated to Counties 4 Berks/Bucks & Oxon (South).

Team	Ground	Capacity	Town/Village	Previous season
Aldermaston	Recreational Society		Aldermaston, Berkshire	9th
Berkshire Shire Hall	Berkshire County Sports Club		Sonning, Reading, Berkshire	Promoted from Counties 4 Berks/Bucks & Oxon (South) (runners-up)
Bracknell III	Lily Hill Park		Bracknell, Berkshire	5th
Farnham Royal	Farnham Royal Playing Fields		Slough, Berkshire	8th
Henley III	Dry Leas		Henley-on-Thames, Oxfordshire	Runners-up
High Wycombe II	Kingsmead Road		High Wycombe, Buckinghamshire	Promoted from Counties 4 Berks/Bucks & Oxon (South) (3rd)
Phoenix	The Sports Ground		Taplow, Buckinghamshire	6th
Reading II	Holme Park		Sonning, Reading, Berkshire	4th
Reading Abbey II	Rosehill		Reading, Berkshire	Promoted from Counties 4 Berks/Bucks & Oxon (South) (champions)
Windsor II	Home Park		Windsor, Berkshire	7th

Locations of the 2024-25 Counties 3 Berks/Bucks & Oxon (South) teams in Buckinghamshire & Oxfordshire
Locations of the 2024-25 Counties 3 Berks/Bucks & Oxon (South) teams in Berkshire

== 2023–24 ==
=== North ===
Departing were Oxford Harlequins III, promoted to Counties 2 Berks/Bucks & Oxon (North). Grove II (9th) and Didcot II (10th) were relegated.

Team	Ground	Capacity	Town/Village	Previous season
Abingdon II	Southern Sports Park		Abingdon, Oxfordshire	8th
Aylesbury II	Ostler's Field		Weston Turville, Aylesbury, Buckinghamshire	3rd
Banbury III	Bodicote Park		Banbury, Oxfordshire	7th
Buckingham II	Floyd Field		Maids Moreton, Buckingham, Buckinghamshire	2nd
Faringdon	Folly Sports Park		Faringdon, Oxfordshire	Relegated from Counties 2 Berks/Bucks & Oxon (North)
Risborough	Princes Risborough School		Princes Risborough, Buckinghamshire	4th
Stow-on-the-Wold II	Oddington Road		Stow-on-the-Wold, Gloucestershire	Promoted from Counties 4 Berks/Bucks & Oxon (North) (runners-up)
Wallingford II	Wallingford Sports Park		Wallingford, Oxfordshire	5th
Witney III	Hailey Road		Witney, Oxfordshire	6th

Locations of the 2023-24 Counties 3 Berks/Bucks & Oxon (North) teams in Oxfordshire & Gloucestershire
Locations of the 2023-24 Counties 3 Berks/Bucks & Oxon teams (North) in Buckinghamshire

=== South ===
Departing were Crowthorne promoted to Counties 2 Berks/Bucks & Oxon (South) having finished as runners-up to champions Rams IV who did not return for the campaign and returned to their local merit league. Also leaving were Reading Abbey II (8th) and High Wycombe II (9th), both relegated.

Team	Ground	Capacity	Town/Village	Previous season
Aldermaston	Recreational Society		Aldermaston, Berkshire	Relegated from Counties 2 Berks/Bucks & Oxon (South)
Amersham & Chiltern II	Weedon Lane		Amersham, Buckinghamshire	Relegated from Counties 2 Berks/Bucks & Oxon (North)
Bracknell III	Lily Hill Park		Bracknell, Berkshire	3rd
Farnham Royal	Farnham Royal Playing Fields		Slough, Berkshire	Promoted from Counties 4 Berks/Bucks & Oxon (South) (runners-up)
Henley III	Dry Leas		Henley-on-Thames, Oxfordshire	Dropped from Counties 2 Berks/Bucks & Oxon (South) (6th)
Marlow II	Riverwoods Drive		Marlow, Buckinghamshire	6th
Phoenix	The Sports Ground		Taplow, Buckinghamshire	5th
Reading II	Holme Park		Sonning, Reading, Berkshire	Relegated from Counties 2 Berks/Bucks & Oxon (South)
Tadley II	Red Lane		Aldermaston, Berkshire	4th
Windsor II	Home Park		Windsor, Berkshire	7th

Locations of the 2023-24 Counties 3 Berks/Bucks & Oxon (South) teams in Buckinghamshire & Oxfordshire
Locations of the 2023-24 Counties 3 Berks/Bucks & Oxon (South) teams in Berkshire

== 2022–23 ==
This was the first season following the RFU Adult Competition Review.

=== North ===
Team	Ground	Capacity	Town/Village	Previous season
Abingdon II	Southern Sports Park		Abingdon, Oxfordshire	
Aylesbury II	Ostler's Field		Weston Turville, Aylesbury, Buckinghamshire	
Banbury III	Bodicote Park		Banbury, Oxfordshire	
Buckingham II	Floyd Field		Maids Moreton, Buckingham, Buckinghamshire	
Didcot II	Boundary Park		Didcot, Oxfordshire	
Grove II	Cane Lane		Grove, Oxfordshire	
Oxford Harlequins III	Horspath Sports Ground		Horspath, Oxfordshire	
Risborough	Princes Risborough School		Princes Risborough, Buckinghamshire	
Wallingford II	Wallingford Sports Park		Wallingford, Oxfordshire	
Witney III	Hailey Road		Witney, Oxfordshire	

Locations of the 2022-23 Counties 3 Berks/Bucks & Oxon (North) teams in Oxfordshire
Locations of the 2022-23 Counties 3 Berks/Bucks & Oxon teams (North) in Buckinghamshire

=== South ===
Team	Ground	Capacity	Town/Village	Previous season
Bracknell III	Lily Hill Park		Bracknell, Berkshire	
Crowthorne	The Crows New Nest		Crowthorne, Berkshire	
High Wycombe II	Kingsmead Road		High Wycombe, Buckinghamshire	
Marlow II	Riverwoods Drive		Marlow, Buckinghamshire	
Phoenix	The Sports Ground		Taplow, Buckinghamshire	
Rams IV	Old Bath Road		Sonning, Reading, Berkshire	
Reading Abbey II	Rosehill		Reading, Berkshire	
Tadley II	Red Lane		Aldermaston, Berkshire	
Windsor II	Home Park		Windsor, Berkshire	

Locations of the 2022-23 Counties 3 Berks/Bucks & Oxon (South) teams in Buckinghamshire
Locations of the 2022-23 Counties 3 Berks/Bucks & Oxon (South) teams in Berkshire

== 2017–2022 ==
Contested (2020-21 aside) but not as an RFU administered league.

== Participating clubs 2016–17 ==
- Amersham & Chiltern II
- Aylesbury II
- Bracknell II
- Chinnor III
- Maidenhead IV
- Reading II
- Reading Abbey II
- Redingensians III
- Thatcham II
- Windsor II
- Witney II

== Participating clubs 2012–13 ==
- Beaconsfield II
- Bracknell III
- Chinnor III
- Henley III
- High Wycombe II
- Maidenhead II
- Marlow II
- Reading II
- Redingensians III
- Windsor II
- Witney II

== Berks/Bucks & Oxon 1 North Honours ==
Berks/Bucks & Oxon 1 North Honours
Season	No of Teams	Champions	Runners–up	Relegated Teams	League Name
2004-05	10	Witney II (Note: Promoted to Berks/Bucks & Oxon Premier A along with Aylesbury II and Olney 2nd XV.)	Aylesbury II, Olney 2nd XV (also promoted)	Bicester II, Winslow	Berks/Bucks & Oxon 1 North
2005-06	10	Chinnor III (Note: Promoted to Berks/Bucks & Oxon Premier A.)	Aylesbury Athletic	Banbury II, Bletchley II	Berks/Bucks & Oxon 1 North
2006-07	11	Bletchley II (Note: Promoted to Berks/Bucks & Oxon Premier A.)	Aylesbury Athletic	Bicester II	Berks/Bucks & Oxon 1 North
2007-08	11	Milton Keynes 2nd XV (Note: Transferred into East Midlands Merit League.)	Amersham & Chiltern II (Note: Promoted to Berks/Bucks & Oxon Premier A.)	Gosford All Blacks II	Berks/Bucks & Oxon 1 North
2008-09	10	Bicester II (Note: Promoted to Berks/Bucks & Oxon Premier A.)	Aylesbury Athletic	Buckingham III, Bletchley II	Berks/Bucks & Oxon 1 North
2009-10	10	Amersham & Chiltern III	Oxford Harlequins III	Chinnor IV, Banbury II	Berks/Bucks & Oxon 1 North
2010-11	10	Beaconsfield II (Note: Transferred into Berks/Bucks & Oxon 1.)	Risborough (Note: Transferred into Berks/Bucks & Oxon Premier.)	No relegation	Berks/Bucks & Oxon 1 North (Note: The Berks/Bucks & Oxon league would be completely restructured the following season. 1st teams in this division would transfer to either Berks/Bucks & Oxon Premier or Berks/Bucks & Oxon Championship while 2nd/3rd teams would transfer to either Berks/Bucks & Oxon 1 or Berks/Bucks & Oxon 2 depending on league position.)
Green backgrounds are promotion places.

== Berks/Bucks & Oxon 1 South Honours ==
Berks/Bucks & Oxon 1 South Honours
Season	No of Teams	Champions	Runners–up	Relegated Teams	League Name
2004-05	10	Newbury Stags (Note: Promoted to Berks/Bucks & Oxon Premier along with Swindon College Old Boys.)	Swindon College Old Boys	Aldermaston	Berks/Bucks & Oxon 1 South
2005-06	12	Crowthorne (Note: Promoted to Berks/Bucks & Oxon Premier along with Abingdon.)	Abingdon	Newbury IV, Phoenix II	Berks/Bucks & Oxon 1 South
2006-07	11	Bracknell III (Note: Promoted to Berks/Bucks & Oxon Premier A.)	Farnham Royal (Note: Promoted to Berks/Bucks & Oxon Premier.)	Aldermaston	Berks/Bucks & Oxon 1 South
2007-08	11	Wallingford II (Note: Promoted to Berks/Bucks & Oxon Premier A.)	Maidenhead III	Slough II	Berks/Bucks & Oxon 1 South
2008-09	10	Maidenhead III (Note: Promoted to Berks/Bucks & Oxon Premier A.)	Thatcham (Note: Promoted to Berks/Bucks & Oxon Premier.)	Didcot	Berks/Bucks & Oxon 1 South
2009-10	11	Henley III (Note: Promoted to Berks/Bucks & Oxon Premier A.)	Hungerford (Note: Promoted to Berks/Bucks & Oxon Premier.)	Aldermaston, Berkshire Shire Hall	Berks/Bucks & Oxon 1 South
2010-11	11	Bracknell III (Note: Transferred to Berks/Bucks & Oxon 1.)	Tadley II (Note: Transferred to Berks/Bucks & Oxon 2.)	No relegation	Berks/Bucks & Oxon 1 South (Note: The Berks/Bucks & Oxon league would be completely restructured the following season. 1st teams in this division would transfer to either Berks/Bucks & Oxon Premier or Berks/Bucks & Oxon Championship while 2nd/3rd teams would transfer to either Berks/Bucks & Oxon 1 or Berks/Bucks & Oxon 2 depending on league position.)
Green backgrounds are promotion places.

== Berks/Bucks & Oxon 1 Honours ==
Berks/Bucks & Oxon 1 Honours
Season	No of Teams	Champions	Runners–up	Relegated Teams	League Name
2011-12	11	Witney II	Henley III	Wallingford II, Reading Abbey II	Berks/Bucks & Oxon 1
2012-13	11	Bracknell III	Windsor II	High Wycombe II	Berks/Bucks & Oxon 1
2013-14	11	Amersham & Chiltern II	Windsor II	Marlow II, Beaconsfield II	Berks/Bucks & Oxon 1
2014-15	11	Bracknell II	Witney II	Buckingham II, Windsor II	Berks/Bucks & Oxon 1
2015-16	11	Bracknell II	Chinnor III	Oxford Harlequins II, Henley III	Berks/Bucks & Oxon 1
2016-17	11	Chinnor III	Maidenhead II	Thatcham II, Reading II	Berks/Bucks & Oxon 1
2017-18	11				
Green backgrounds are promotion places.

== See also ==
- Berkshire RFU
- Buckinghamshire RFU
- Oxfordshire RFU
- English rugby union system
- Rugby union in England
