= Counties 1 Southern North =

Division at level 7 of the English rugby union system

- Current season or competition: 2025–26 Counties 1 Southern North
- Sport: Rugby union
- Instituted: 1987; 39 years ago (as Southern Counties)
- Number of teams: 12
- Country: England
- Holders: Oxford Harlequins II (2024–25)
- Most titles: Beaconsfield; High Wycombe; Witney (3 titles)
- Website: englandrugby.com

Counties 1 Southern North (formerly known as Southern Counties North) is a division at level 7 of the English rugby union system. When league rugby first began in 1987 it was known as Southern Counties but since 1996 the division was split into two regional leagues – Southern Counties North and Southern Counties South. Counties 1 Southern North currently sits at the seventh tier of club rugby union in England and features teams based in Berkshire, Buckinghamshire and Oxfordshire. The league champions at the end of each season are promoted to Regional 2 South Central or Regional 2 Thames. Relegated teams usually drop to Counties 2 Berks/Bucks & Oxon (North) or Counties 2 Berks/Bucks & Oxon (South).

== Format ==
The twelve teams in this league are drawn from Berkshire, Buckinghamshire and Oxfordshire, with the league champions (if eligible) promoted to Regional 2 South Central. The league's bottom two teams are relegated to either Counties 2 Berks/Bucks & Oxon (North) or Counties 2 Berks/Bucks & Oxon (South), depending on their geographic location. The season runs from September to April and comprises twenty-two rounds of matches, with each club playing each of its rivals home and away. The results of the matches contribute points to the league table as follows:

- 4 points are awarded for a win
- 2 points are awarded for a draw
- 0 points are awarded for a loss, however
- 1 losing (bonus) point is awarded to a team that loses a match by 7 points or fewer
- 1 additional (bonus) point is awarded to a team scoring 4 tries or more in a match

== 2026–27 ==
Departing were Chinnor III promoted to Regional 2 Severn as champions and runners-up respectively while Bletchley (10th) were relegated to Counties 2 Berks/Bucks & Oxon (East) together with Wallingford (11th) and Gosford All Blacks (12th) both relegated to Counties 2 Berks/Bucks & Oxon (West).

Team	Ground	Capacity	Town/Area	Previous season
Banbury II	Bodicote Park		Banbury, Oxfordshire	Promoted from Counties 2 BBO (West) (Champions)
Beaconsfield II	Oak Lodge Meadow		Beaconsfield, Buckinghamshire	Promoted from Counties 2 BBO (East) (Champions)
Bicester	Oxford Road		Bicester, Oxfordshire	8th
Bracknell II	Lily Hill Park		Bracknell, Berkshire	7th
Buckingham	Floyd Field		Maids Moreton, Buckingham, Buckinghamshire	2nd
Henley II	Dry Leas		Henley-on-Thames, Oxfordshire	3rd
High Wycombe	Kingsmead Road		High Wycombe, Buckinghamshire	4th
Oxford	North Hinksey Park		North Hinksey, Oxford, Oxfordshire	9th
Oxford Harlequins II	Horspath Sports Ground	1,000	Horspath, Oxfordshire	Relegated from Regional 2 Thames (12th)
Reading	Holme Park		Sonning, Reading, Berkshire	5th
Reading Abbey	Rosehill		Reading, Berkshire	6th
Windsor	Home Park		Windsor, Berkshire	Relegated from Regional 2 Thames (11th)

Locations of the 2026–27 Counties 1 Southern North teams

== 2025–26 ==
=== Participating teams and locations ===
Departing were Oxford Harlequins II and Windsor, promoted to Regional 2 Thames as champions and runners-up respectively. Grove (12th) were relegated to Counties 2 Berks/Bucks & Oxon (West).

Team	Ground	Capacity	Town/Area	Previous season
Bicester	Oxford Road		Bicester, Oxfordshire	10th
Bletchley	Manor Fields		Bletchley, Milton Keynes, Buckinghamshire	5th
Bracknell II	Lily Hill Park		Bracknell, Berkshire	11th
Buckingham	Floyd Field		Maids Moreton, Buckingham, Buckinghamshire	3rd
Chinnor III	Kingsey Road	2,000	Thame, Oxfordshire	4th
Gosford All Blacks	Stratfield Brake		Kidlington, Oxfordshire	Promoted from Counties 2 Berks/Bucks & Oxon North (runners-up)
Henley II	Dry Leas		Henley-on-Thames, Oxfordshire	Promoted from Counties 2 Berks/Bucks & Oxon South (champions)
High Wycombe	Kingsmead Road		High Wycombe, Buckinghamshire	7th
Oxford	North Hinksey Park		North Hinksey, Oxford, Oxfordshire	Promoted from Counties 2 Berks/Bucks & Oxon North (champions)
Reading	Holme Park		Sonning, Reading, Berkshire	9th
Reading Abbey	Rosehill		Reading, Berkshire	6th
Wallingford	Wallingford Sports Park		Wallingford, Oxfordshire	8th

Locations of the 2025−26 Counties 1 Southern North teams

== 2024–25 ==
=== Participating teams and locations ===
Departing were Beaconsfield, promoted to Regional 2 Thames whilst Milton Keynes (12th) were relegated to Counties 2 Berks/Bucks & Oxon (North) and Rams III (11th) relegated to Counties 2 Berks/Bucks & Oxon (South).

Team	Ground	Capacity	Town/Area	Previous season
Bicester	Oxford Road		Bicester, Oxfordshire	7th
Bletchley	Manor Fields		Bletchley, Milton Keynes, Buckinghamshire	9th
Bracknell II	Lily Hill Park		Bracknell, Berkshire	10th
Buckingham	Floyd Field		Maids Moreton, Buckingham, Buckinghamshire	5th
Chinnor III	Kingsey Road	2,000	Thame, Oxfordshire	8th
Grove	Cane Lane		Grove, Oxfordshire	6th
High Wycombe	Kingsmead Road		High Wycombe, Buckinghamshire	Promoted from Counties 2 Berks/Bucks & Oxon North (1st)
Oxford Harlequins II	Horspath Sports Ground	1,000	Horspath, Oxfordshire	4th
Reading	Holme Park		Sonning, Reading, Berkshire	Relegated from Regional 2 South Central (12th)
Reading Abbey	Rosehill		Reading, Berkshire	Promoted from Counties 2 Berks/Bucks & Oxon South (1st)
Wallingford	Wallingford Sports Park		Wallingford, Oxfordshire	3rd
Windsor	Home Park		Windsor, Berkshire	2nd

Locations of the 2024–25 Counties 1 Southern North teams

=== League table ===
Counties 1 Southern North 2024–25
	Team	Played	Won	Drawn	Lost	Points for	Points against	Points diff	Try bonus	Loss bonus	Points	Points adj
1	Oxford Harlequins II (P)	22	21	0	1	962	323	639	19	1	105	+1
2	Windsor	22	19	0	3	849	3337	512	17	2	96	+1
3	Buckingham	22	15	0	7	879	476	403	16	4	80	
4	Chinnor III	22	14	0	8	633	459	174	13	2	72	+1
5	Bletchley	22	13	1	8	603	603	0	15	2	71	
6	Reading Abbey	22	10	0	12	535	627	−92	11	5	56	
7	High Wycombe RFC	22	9	1	12	648	537	111	14	2	54	
8	Wallingford	22	9	0	13	431	538	−107	9	4	51	+2
9	Reading	22	8	0	14	451	597	−146	4	6	42	
10	Bicester	22	7	0	15	484	686	−202	10	4	37	−5
11	Bracknell II	22	4	0	18	484	686	−202	10	4	37	
12	Grove (R)	22	1	0	21	314	1119	−805	4	2	−6	−16
If teams are level at any stage, tiebreakers are applied in the following order: 1. Number of matches won 2. Number of draws 3. Difference between points for and against 4. Total number of points for 5. Aggregate number of points scored in matches between tied teams 6. Number of matches won excluding the first match, then the second and so on until the tie is settled
Green background are the promotion places. Pink background are the relegation places. Updated: 25 February 2026; Source:

== 2023–24 ==
=== Participating teams and locations ===
Departing was the second-placed team Marlow, promoted to Regional 2 Thames. Champions Chinnor III) were not promoted owing to league rules regarding third teams. Five teams were relegated; Gosford All Blacks (8th) and High Wycombe (10th) were relegated to Counties 2 Berks/Bucks & Oxon (North), Reading Abbey (9th) and Thatcham (12th) were relegated to Counties 2 Berks/Bucks & Oxon (South), while Swindon College Old Boys (11th) were relegated to Counties 2 Dorset & Wilts North.

Team	Ground	Capacity	Town/Area	Previous season
Beaconsfield	Oak Lodge Meadow		Beaconsfield, Buckinghamshire	Relegated from Regional 2 Thames
Bicester	Oxford Road		Bicester, Oxfordshire	4th
Bletchley	Manor Fields		Bletchley, Milton Keynes, Buckinghamshire	7th
Bracknell II	Lily Hill Park		Bracknell, Berkshire	5th
Buckingham	Floyd Field		Maids Moreton, Buckingham, Buckinghamshire	Relegated from Regional 2 South Central (12th)
Chinnor III	Kingsey Road	2,000	Thame, Oxfordshire	1st
Grove	Cane Lane		Grove, Oxfordshire	Relegated from Regional 2 South Central (11th)
Milton Keynes	Emerson Valley		Shenley Brook End, Milton Keynes, Buckinghamshire	6th
Oxford Harlequins II	Horspath Sports Ground	1,000	Horspath, Oxfordshire	Promoted from Counties 2 Tribute Berks/Bucks & Oxon North (1st)
Rams III	Old Bath Road	1,250	Sonning, Reading, Berkshire	Promoted from Counties 2 Tribute Berks/Bucks & Oxon South (1st)
Wallingford	Wallingford Sports Park		Wallingford, Oxfordshire	3rd
Windsor	Home Park		Windsor, Berkshire	Relegated from Regional 2 Thames

Locations of the 2023–24 Counties 1 Southern North teams

=== League table ===
Counties 1 Southern North 2023–24
	Team	Played	Won	Drawn	Lost	Points for	Points against	Points diff	Try bonus	Loss bonus	Points	Points adj
1	Beaconsfield (P)	22	22	0	0	1069	172	897	19	0	108	+1
2	Windsor	22	17	0	5	846	360	486	18	1	87	
3	Wallingford	22	13	3	6	663	411	252	12	3	73	
4	Oxford Harlequins II	22	14	0	8	650	448	202	14	2	72	
5	Buckingham	22	13	1	8	603	603	0	15	2	71	
6	Grove	22	11	2	9	582	614	−32	10	1	57	−2
7	Bicester	22	9	1	12	481	538	−57	10	1	49	
8	Chinnor III	22	8	0	14	502	656	−154	9	4	45	
9	Bletchley	22	6	1	15	398	626	−228	8	3	35	−2
10	Bracknell II	22	7	0	15	430	797	−367	8	2	33	−5
11	Rams III (R)	22	5	0	17	416	857	−441	7	3	30	
12	Milton Keynes (R)	22	3	0	19	348	906	−558	4	2	18	
If teams are level at any stage, tiebreakers are applied in the following order: 1. Number of matches won 2. Number of draws 3. Difference between points for and against 4. Total number of points for 5. Aggregate number of points scored in matches between tied teams 6. Number of matches won excluding the first match, then the second and so on until the tie is settled
Green background is the promotion place. Pink background are the relegation places. Updated: 23 February 2026; Source:

== 2022–23 ==
=== Participating teams and locations ===
This was the first season following the RFU Adult Competition Review. The league was substantially similar to Southern Counties North with eight teams returning from season 2021–22.

Team	Ground	Capacity	Town/Area	Previous season
Bicester	Oxford Road		Bicester, Oxfordshire	10th Southern Counties North
Bletchley	Manor Fields		Bletchley, Milton Keynes, Buckinghamshire	Champions Berks/Bucks & Oxon Premier
Bracknell II	Lily Hill Park		Bracknell, Berkshire	New entry
Chinnor III	Kingsey Road	2,000	Thame, Oxfordshire	Champions Berks/Bucks & Oxon 1
Gosford All Blacks	Stratfield Brake		Kidlington, Oxfordshire	11th Southern Counties North
High Wycombe	Kingsmead Road		High Wycombe, Buckinghamshire	5th Southern Counties North
Marlow	Riverwoods Drive		Marlow, Buckinghamshire	7th Southern Counties North
Milton Keynes	Emerson Valley		Shenley Brook End, Milton Keynes, Buckinghamshire	9th Southern Counties North
Reading Abbey	Rosehill		Reading, Berkshire	6th Southern Counties North
Swindon College Old Boys	Nationwide Sports Pavilion		Swindon, Wiltshire	10th Southern Counties South
Thatcham	Henwicky Worthy Sports Field		Thatcham, Berkshire	12th Southern Counties North
Wallingford	Wallingford Sports Park		Wallingford, Oxfordshire	8th Southern Counties North

Locations of the 2022–23 Counties 1 Southern North teams

=== League table ===
Counties 1 Southern North 2022–23
	Team	Played	Won	Drawn	Lost	Points for	Points against	Points diff	Try bonus	Loss bonus	Points	Points deducted
1	Chinnor III	22	19	2	1	852	219	633	16	0	98	
2	Marlow (P)	22	18	1	3	755	301	454	16	2	92	
3	Wallingford	22	16	1	5	495	246	249	10	3	80	
4	Bicester	22	15	1	6	699	370	329	10	2	74	
5	Bracknell II	22	12	1	9	697	384	313	12	6	68	
6	Milton Keynes	22	12	0	10	462	486	−24	9	0	58	
7	Bletchley	22	7	0	15	352	563	−211	7	3	39'	
8	Gosford All Blacks (R)	22	8	0	14	385	586	−201	5	5	38	−5
9	Reading Abbey (R)	21	6	0	15	263	599	−336	4	3	32	
10	High Wycombe (R)	22	7	0	15	365	629	−264	5	1	29	−5
11	Swindon College Old Boys (R)	21	5	0	16	382	770	−388	5	0	25	
12	Thatcham (R)	22	3	0	19	212	766	−554	1	2	5	−20
If teams are level at any stage, tiebreakers are applied in the following order: 1. Number of matches won 2. Number of draws 3. Difference between points for and against 4. Total number of points for 5. Aggregate number of points scored in matches between tied teams 6. Number of matches won excluding the first match, then the second and so on until the tie is settled
Green background is the promotion place. Pink background are the relegation places. Updated: 22 February 2026; Source:

== 2021–22 ==
=== Participating teams and locations ===
Team	Ground	Capacity	Town/Area	Previous season
Aylesbury	Ostler's Field		Weston Turville, Aylesbury, Buckinghamshire	6th
Bicester	Oxford Road		Bicester, Oxfordshire	7th
Gosford All Blacks	Stratfield Brake		Kidlington, Oxfordshire	Promoted from BBO Premier (champions)
High Wycombe	Kingsmead Road		High Wycombe, Buckinghamshire	5th
Marlow	Riverwoods Drive		Marlow, Buckinghamshire	4th
Milton Keynes	Emerson Valley		Shenley Brook End, Milton Keynes, Buckinghamshire	Promoted from BBO Premier (runners-up)
Reading	Holme Park		Sonning, Reading, Berkshire	2nd
Reading Abbey	Rosehill		Reading, Berkshire	10th
Shipston-on-Stour	Mayo Road	600	Shipston-on-Stour, Warwickshire	3rd
Stow-on-the-Wold	Oddington Road		Stow-on-the-Wold, Gloucestershire	8th
Thatcham	Henwicky Worthy Sports Field		Thatcham, Berkshire	Level transfer from Southern Counties South (11th)
Wallingford	Wallingford Sports Park		Wallingford, Oxfordshire	9th

Locations of the 2021–22 Southern Counties North teams

== 2020–21 ==
Due to the coronavirus pandemic the season was cancelled.

== 2019–20 ==
=== Participating teams and locations ===
Team	Ground	Capacity	Town/Area	Previous season
Aylesbury	Ostler's Field		Weston Turville, Aylesbury, Buckinghamshire	5th
Bicester	Oxford Road		Bicester, Oxfordshire	4th
Chesham	Chiltern Hills Academy		Chesham, Buckinghamshire	Promoted from BBO Premier (champions)
Didcot	Boundary Park		Didcot, Oxfordshire	Promoted from BBO Premier (runners up)
High Wycombe	Kingsmead Road		High Wycombe, Buckinghamshire	9th
Marlow	Riverwoods Drive		Marlow, Buckinghamshire	3rd
Reading	Holme Park		Sonning, Reading, Berkshire	8th
Reading Abbey	Rosehill		Reading, Berkshire	7th
Shipston-on-Stour	Mayo Road	600	Shipston-on-Stour, Warwickshire	Promoted from Midlands 3 WS (runners up - level transfer)
Stow-on-the-Wold	Oddington Road		Stow-on-the-Wold, Gloucestershire	10th
Wallingford	Wallingford Sports Park		Wallingford, Oxfordshire	6th
Witney	Witney Road		Hailey, Witney, Oxfordshire	Relegated from South West 1 East (12th)

Locations of the 2019–20 Southern Counties North teams

== 2018–19 ==
=== Participating teams and locations ===
Team	Ground	Capacity	Town/Area	Previous season
Aylesbury	Ostler's Field		Weston Turville, Aylesbury, Buckinghamshire	4th
Bicester	Oxford Road		Bicester, Oxfordshire	Relegated from South West 1 East (14th)
Buckingham	Floyd Field		Maids Moreton, Buckingham, Buckinghamshire	3rd
Littlemore	Oxford Academy		Littlemore, Oxford, Oxfordshire	Promoted from Berks/Bucks & Oxon Premier (runners up)
High Wycombe	Kingsmead Road		High Wycombe, Buckinghamshire	9th
Marlow	Riverwoods Drive		Marlow, Buckinghamshire	Relegated from South West 1 East (12th)
Reading	Holme Park		Sonning, Reading, Berkshire	7th
Reading Abbey	Rosehill		Reading, Berkshire	8th
Slough	Tamblyn Fields		Slough, Berkshire	Promoted from Berks/Bucks & Oxon Premier (champions)
Stow-on-the-Wold	Oddington Road		Stow-on-the-Wold, Gloucestershire	10th
Wallingford	Wallingford Sports Park		Wallingford, Oxfordshire	6th
Windsor	Home Park		Windsor, Berkshire	Runners up (lost playoff)

Locations of the 2018–19 Southern Counties North teams

== 2017–18 ==
=== Participating teams and locations ===
Team	Ground	Capacity	Town/Village	Previous season
Aylesbury	Ostler's Field		Weston Turville, Aylesbury, Buckinghamshire	3rd
Beaconsfield	Oak Lodge Meadow		Beaconsfield, Buckinghamshire	7th
Buckingham	Floyd Field		Maids Moreton, Buckingham, Buckinghamshire	4th
Drifters	Farnham Common Sports Club		Farnham Common, Buckinghamshire	Promoted from Berks/Bucks & Oxon Premier (runners up)
Gosford All Blacks	Stratfield Brake		Kidlington, Oxfordshire	10th
High Wycombe	Kingsmead Road		High Wycombe, Buckinghamshire	8th
Reading	Holme Park		Sonning, Reading, Berkshire	Relegated from South West 1 East (14th)
Reading Abbey	Rosehill		Reading, Berkshire	Relegated from South West 1 East (13th)
Stow-on-the-Wold	Oddington Road		Stow-on-the-Wold, Gloucestershire	9th
Thatcham	Henwicky Worthy Sports Field		Thatcham, Berkshire	5th
Wallingford	Wallingford Sports Park		Wallingford, Oxfordshire	6th
Windsor	Home Park		Windsor, Berkshire	Relegated from South West 1 East (12th)

Locations of the 2017–18 Southern Counties North teams

== 2016–17 ==
=== Participating teams and locations ===
Team	Ground	Capacity	Town/Village	Previous season
Aylesbury	Ostler's Field		Weston Turville, Aylesbury, Buckinghamshire	2nd (lost play-off)
Beaconsfield	Oak Lodge Meadow		Beaconsfield, Buckinghamshire	6th
Bicester	Oxford Road		Bicester, Oxfordshire	4th
Bletchley	Manor Fields		Bletchley, Milton Keynes, Buckinghamshire	8th
Buckingham	Floyd Field		Maids Moreton, Buckingham, Buckinghamshire	3rd
Gosford All Blacks	Stratfield Brake		Kidlington, Oxfordshire	Promoted from Berks/Bucks & Oxon Premier (champions)
High Wycombe	Kingsmead Road		High Wycombe, Buckinghamshire	Relegated from South West 1 East (12th)
Marlow	Riverwoods Drive		Marlow, Buckinghamshire	7th
Milton Keynes	Emerson Valley		Milton Keynes, Buckinghamshire	Promoted from Berks/Bucks & Oxon Premier (runners up)
Stow-on-the-Wold	Oddington Road		Stow-on-the-Wold, Gloucestershire	9th
Thatcham	Henwicky Worthy Sports Field		Thatcham, Berkshire	10th
Wallingford	Wallingford Sports Park		Wallingford, Oxfordshire	5th

Locations of the 2016–17 Southern Counties North teams

== 2015–16 ==
=== Participating teams and locations ===
The 2015–16 Southern Counties North consisted of twelve teams; six from Buckinghamshire, two each from Berkshire and Oxfordshire, and one each from Gloucestershire and Wiltshire. The season started on 12 September 2015 and the last league matches were played on 23 April 2016.

Seven of the twelve teams participated in last season's competition. The 2014–15 champions High Wycombe were promoted to the South West 1 East while Milton Keynes and Alchester were relegated to the Berks/Bucks & Oxon Premier. Royal Wootton Bassett, who finished 4th, were level transferred to Southern Counties South.

Locations of the 2015–16 Southern Counties North teams
Locations of the 2015–16 Southern Counties North teams in South Buckinghamshire

Team	Ground	Capacity	Town/Village	Previous season
Aylesbury	Ostler's Field		Weston Turville, Aylesbury, Buckinghamshire	2nd (lost promotion play-off)
Beaconsfield	Oak Lodge Meadow		Beaconsfield, Buckinghamshire	8th
Bicester	Oxford Road		Bicester, Oxfordshire	5th
Bletchley	Manor Fields		Bletchley, Milton Keynes, Buckinghamshire	relegated from South West 1 East (14th)
Buckingham	Floyd Field		Maids Moreton, Buckingham, Buckinghamshire	relegated from South West 1 East (13th)
Drifters	Farnham Common Sports Club		Farnham Common, Buckinghamshire	9th
Marlow	Riverwoods Drive		Marlow, Buckinghamshire	7th
Reading Abbey	Rosehill		Reading, Berkshire	promoted from Berks/Bucks & Oxon Premier (champions)
Stow-on-the-Wold	Oddington Road		Stow-on-the-Wold, Gloucestershire	4th
Swindon College Old Boys	Nationwide Sports Pavilion		Swindon, Wiltshire	promoted from Berks/Bucks & Oxon Premier (runner-up)
Thatcham	Henwicky Worthy Sports Field		Thatcham, Berkshire	6th
Wallingford	Wallingford Sports Park		Wallingford, Oxfordshire	10th

== 2014–15 ==
- Alchester
- Aylesbury
- Beaconsfield
- Bicester (promoted from Berks/Bucks & Oxon Premier)
- Drifters
- High Wycombe
- Marlow (relegated from South West 1 East)
- Milton Keynes
- Royal Wootton Bassett
- Stow-on-the-Wold
- Thatcham
- Wallingford

== 2013–14 ==
- Alchester
- Aylesbury
- Bletchley
- Drifters
- High Wycombe
- Milton Keynes
- Reading Abbey
- Royal Wootton Bassett
- Stow-on-the-Wold
- Swindon College Old Boys
- Thatcham
- Wallingford

== 2012–13 ==
- Alchester
- Aylesbury
- Buckingham
- Drifters
- Grove
- Milton Keynes
- Olney
- Reading Abbey
- Slough
- Tadley
- Thatcham
- Wallingford

== Original teams ==
When league rugby began in 1987 this division (known as Southern Counties) contained the following teams:

- Aylesbury
- Banbury
- Bletchley
- Bracknell
- Marlow
- Oxford Marathon (Note: Oxford Marathon would merge with Oxford Old Boys in 1996 to form Oxford Harlequins.)
- Oxford Old Boys (Note: Oxford Old Boys would merge with Oxford Marathon in 1996 to form Oxford Harlequins.)
- Redingensians (Note: Redingensians are currently known as Rams.)
- Swindon
- Wimborne
- Windsor

== Counties 1 Southern North honours ==
=== Southern Counties (1987–1993) ===
Originally the Southern Counties North and Southern Counties South leagues were combined in a single division called Southern Counties. It was a tier 7 league with promotion to South West 2 (Note: South West 2 is currently two regional divisions - South West 1 East and South West 1 West.) and relegation to either Berks/Dorset/Wilts 1 (Note: Berks/Dorset/Wilts 1 no longer contains Berkshire clubs and is currently split into Dorset & Wilts 1 North and Dorset & Wilts 1 South.) or Bucks/Oxon 1. (Note: Bucks/Oxon 1 has since involved Berkshire clubs and is currently known as Berks/Bucks & Oxon Premier)

Southern Counties
Season	No of teams	Champions	Runners-up	Relegated teams	Ref
1987–88	11	Redingensians	Swindon	Bracknell	
1988–89	11	Banbury	Aylesbury	Oxford Marathon	
1989–90	11	Marlow	Swanage & Wareham	Oxford Old Boys	
1990–91	11	Sherborne	Windsor	Swindon, Chiltern, Slough, Bracknell	
1991–92	11	Banbury	Aylesbury (Note: 3rd place Windsor also promoted.)	No relegation (Note: No relegation due to league expansion from 11 to 13 teams for the 1992–93 season.)	
1992–93	13	Swanage & Wareham	Dorchester	Grove	
Green backgrounds are promotion places.

=== Southern Counties (1993–1996) ===
At the end of the 1992–93 season the top six teams from London Division 1 and the top six from South West Division 1 were combined to create National 5 South. This meant that Southern Counties dropped from a tier 7 league to a tier 8 league for the years that National 5 South was active. Promotion continued to South West 2 and relegation to either Berks/Dorset/Wilts 1 or Bucks/Oxon 1.

Southern Counties North
Season	No of teams	Champions	Runners-up	Relegated teams	Ref
1993–94	13	Bournemouth	Bracknell	Royal Wootton Bassett, Redingensians	
1994–95	13	Dorchester	Bracknell	Slough, Oxford Marathon	
1995–96	13	Amersham & Chiltern	Bracknell (Note: Due to the cancellation of Courage League Division 5 and subsequent restructuring of the leagues at the end of the 1995–96 season, six clubs were promoted from Southern Counties including Chinnor, Chippenham, Marlow and Swindon.)	No relegation (Note: The cancellation of Courage League Division 5 and splitting of Southern Counties into Southern Counties North and Southern Counties South at the end of the 1995–96 season, meant that there was no relegation.)	
Green backgrounds are promotion places.

=== Southern Counties North (1996–2000) ===
Restructuring by the RFU at the end of the 1995–96 season saw Southern Counties split into two separate leagues, Southern Counties North and Southern Counties South. They reverted to tier 7 leagues due to the cancellation of National 5 South. Promotion from Southern Counties North was now to the new South West 2 East (Note: Another change at the end of the 1995–96 saw South West 2 also split into two regional divisions – South West 2 East and South West 2 West.) while relegation was now only to Bucks/Oxon 1. (Note: Relegated Southern Counties South clubs dropped to Berks/Dorset/Wilts 1.)

Southern Counties North
Season	No of teams	Champions	Runners-up	Relegated teams	Ref
1996–97	10	Stow-on-the-Wold	Bicester	Grove	
1997–98	10	Slough	Olney	Milton Keynes, Witney	
1998–99	10	Olney	Bicester	Farnham Royal	
1999–00	10	Witney	Beaconsfield	Oxford, Wallingford	
Green backgrounds are promotion places.

=== Southern Counties North (2000–2009) ===
Southern Counties North remained a tier 7 league, with promotion continuing to South West 2 East. However, the transfer of Berkshire clubs from the Dorset/Wilts leagues to the Bucks/Oxon leagues, meant that relegation was now to new Berks/Bucks & Oxon 1 (formerly Bucks/Oxon 1). (Note: Berks/Bucks & Oxon 1 would be renamed as Berks/Bucks & Oxon Premier ahead of the 2004–05 season.)

Southern Counties North
Season	No of teams	Champions	Runners-up	Relegated teams	Ref
2000–01	11	Windsor	Grove	Drifters, Bletchley, Phoenix	
2001–02	10	Oxford Harlequins	Grove	Oxford, Milton Keynes, Chipping Norton	
2002–03	10	High Wycombe	Aylesbury	Wallingford, Beaconsfield, Swindon	
2003–04	10	Aylesbury	Amersham & Chiltern	No relegation (Note: No relegation due to league expansion from 10 to 12 teams for the 2004–05 season.)	
2004–05	12	High Wycombe	Henley Wanderers	Phoenix, Bicester	
2005–06	12	Redingensians	Swindon	Slough, Stow-on-the-Wold, Olney	
2006–07	12	Bletchley	Tadley	Supermarine, Chipping Norton	
2007–08	12	Olney	Wallingford	Newbury Stags, Amersham & Chiltern	
2008–09	12	Buckingham	Marlow	Beaconsfield	
Green backgrounds are promotion places.

=== Southern Counties North (2009–2022) ===
Despite widespread league restructuring by the RFU, Southern Counties North continued as a tier 7 league, with promotion to South West 1 East (formerly South West 2 East) and relegation to Berks/Bucks & Oxon Premier.

Southern Counties North
Season	No of teams	Champions	Runners-up	Relegated teams	Ref
2009–10	12	Witney	Amersham & Chiltern	Bicester, Slough	
2010–11	12	Swindon	Aylesbury	Chipping Norton, Oxford, Crowthorne	
2011–12	12	Beaconsfield	Milton Keynes (Note: Although the RFU website has Milton Keynes as runners up, third place Windsor actually went into the playoffs and won promotion.)	Marlborough	
2012–13	12	Buckingham	Grove	Slough, Tadley	
2013–14	12	Bletchley	Aylesbury	Swindon College Old Boys, Reading Abbey	
2014–15	12	High Wycombe	Aylesbury	Milton Keynes, Alchester	
2015–16	12	Reading Abbey	Aylesbury	Drifters, Swindon College Old Boys	
2016–17	12	Marlow	Bicester	Bletchley, Milton Keynes	
2017–18	12	Beaconsfield	Windsor	Drifters, Gosford All Blacks	
2018–19	12	Windsor	Buckingham	Littlemore, Slough	
2019–20	12	Witney	Reading	Didcot, Chesham	
2020–21	12	Season cancelled due to COVID-19 pandemic in the United Kingdom.			
2021–22	12	Stow-on-the-Wold	Reading	No relegation due to league reorganisation	
Green backgrounds are promotion places.

=== Counties 1 Southern North (2022– ) ===
Following the reorganisation of the leagues, Southern Counties North was renamed Counties 1 Southern North and remained a level seven league. The champions are promoted to Regional 2 South Central or Regional 2 Thames and one or two teams (on one occasion five) are relegated, depending on location, to one of the level eight leagues; Counties 2 Berks/Bucks & Oxon.

Counties 1 Southern North
Season	No of teams	No of matches	Champions	Runners-up	Relegated team(s)	Ref
2022–23	12	22	Chinnor III (Note: Not eligible for promotion)	Marlow	Gosford All Blacks (8th), Reading Abbey (9th), High Wycombe (10th), Swindon College Old Boys (11th) and Thatcham (12th)	
2023–24	12	22	Beaconsfield	Windsor	Rams III (11th) and Milton Keynes (12th)	
2024–25	12	22	Oxford Harlequins	Windsor	Grove (12th)	
2025–26	12	22	Chinnor III	Buckingham	Bletchley (11th) and Gosford All Blacks (12th)	
Green background is the promotion place(s).

== Promotion play-offs ==
Between 2000–01 and 2018–19 seasons, there has been a play-off between the runners-up of Southern Counties North and Southern Counties South for the third and final promotion place to South West 1 East. The team with the superior league record had home advantage in the tie. At the end of the 2019–20 season Southern Counties North teams have been the most successful with twelve wins to the Southern Counties South teams seven; and the home team has won promotion on thirteen occasions compared to the away teams six.

Southern Counties North v Southern Counties South promotion play-off results
Season	Home team	Score	Away team	Venue	Att/Ref
2000–01	Salisbury (S)	49–20	Grove (N)	Castle Road, Salisbury, Wiltshire	
2001–02	Grove (N)	30–13	Oakmeadians (S)	Recreation Lane, Grove, Oxfordshire	
2002–03	Oakmeadians (S)	24–17	Aylesbury (N)	Meryick Park, Bournemouth, Dorset	
2003–04	Amersham & Chiltern (N) (Note: The result of the 2003-04 play-off between Amersham & Chiltern and Tadley is unknown due to all the south-west promotion play-off games from this season missing from the RFU website. However, as Amersham & Chiltern were in the higher division the next season (and Tadley were not) it is assumed they won the play-off. Amersham & Chiltern would also have hosted the game as they had a better points record in their league than Tadley did in theirs.)		Tadley (S)	Ash Grove, Amersham, Buckinghamshire	
2004–05	Frome (S)	12–38	Henley Wanderers (N)	Gypsy Lane, Frome, Somerset	
2005–06	Oldfield Old Boys (S)	32–33	Swindon (N)	Shaft Road, Monkton Combe, Somerset	
2006–07	Wootton Bassett (S)	17-20	Tadley (N)	Ballards Ash Sports Ground, Wootton Bassett, Wiltshire	
2007–08	Wallingford (N)	22–3	Wootton Bassett (S)	Wallingford Sports Park, Wallingford, Oxfordshire	
2008–09	Marlow (N)	18-15	Wootton Bassett (S)	Riverwoods Drive, Marlow, Buckinghamshire	
2009–10	Amersham & Chiltern (N)	45–12	Frome (S)	Ash Grove, Amersham, Buckinghamshire	
2010–11	Aylesbury (N)	10–39	Oldfield Old Boys (S)	Ostler's Field, Weston Turville, Aylesbury, Buckinghamshire	
2011–12	Windsor (N)	22–15	Dorcester (S)	Home Park, Windsor, Berkshire	
2012–13	Grove (N)	39–20	Trowbridge (S)	Recreation Lane, Grove, Oxfordshire	
2013–14	Trowbridge (S)	27–19	Aylesbury (N)	Doric Park, Hilperton, Trowbridge, Wiltshire	
2014–15	Salisbury (S)	34–16	Aylesbury (N)	Castle Road, Salisbury, Wiltshire	
2015–16	Midsomer Norton (S)	29–22	Aylesbury (N)	Norton Down Playing Fields, Midsomer Norton, Somerset	
2016–17	Bicester (N)	53–20	Trowbridge (S)	Oxford Road, Bicester, Oxfordshire	
2017–18	Windsor (N)	29–31	Marlborough (S)	Home Park, Windsor, Berkshire	
2018–19	Frome (S)	10–23	Buckingham (N)	Gypsy Lane, Frome, Somerset	400
2019–20	Cancelled due to the COVID-19 pandemic in the United Kingdom. Best ranked runner up – Frome (S) – promoted instead.				
2020–21	Season cancelled due to the COVID-19 pandemic in the United Kingdom.				
2021–22	No play-off due to league reorganisation				
Green background is the promoted team. (N) = Southern Counties North and (S) = Southern Counties South

== Number of league titles ==
- Beaconsfield (3)
- High Wycombe (3)
- Witney (3)
- Banbury (2) (Note: Both of Banbury's titles were won when league was a single division known as Southern Counties.)
- Bletchley (2)
- Buckingham (2)
- Marlow (2) (Note: one of Marlow's titles was won when league was a single division known as Southern Counties.)
- Olney (2)
- Oxford Harlequins (2)
- Redingensians (2) (Note: One of Redingensians titles was won when league was a single division known as Southern Counties.)
- Windsor (2)
- Amersham & Chiltern (1) (Note: Amersham & Chiltern's title was won when league was a single division known as Southern Counties.)
- Aylesbury (1)
- Bournemouth (1) (Note: Bournemouth's title was won when league was a single division known as Southern Counties.)
- Chinnor III (1)
- Dorchester (1) (Note: Dorchester's title was won when league was a single division known as Southern Counties.)
- Reading Abbey (1)
- Sherborne (1) (Note: Sherborne's title was won when league was a single division known as Southern Counties.)
- Slough (1)
- Stow-on-the-Wold (2)
- Swanage & Wareham (1) (Note: Swanage & Wareham's title was won when league was a single division known as Southern Counties.)
- Swindon (1)
- (Updated to 2024–25)

== See also ==
- South West Division RFU
- Berkshire RFU
- Buckinghamshire RFU
- Oxfordshire RFU
- English rugby union system
- Rugby union in England
