= Regional 2 Thames =

English Rugby Union Regional League

- Current season or competition: 2025–26 Regional 2 Thames
- Sport: Rugby union
- Instituted: 2022; 4 years ago
- Number of teams: 12
- Country: England
- Holders: London Scottish Lions (1st title) (2024–25)
- Most titles: Hammersmith & Fulham, Amersham and Chiltern, London Scottish Lions (1 title)

Regional 2 Thames is an English level 6 rugby union regional league for rugby clubs in London and the south-east of England including sides from Bedfordshire, Berkshire, Buckinghamshire, Greater London, Hertfordshire, Middlesex and Surrey. It was created following the 2022 Adult Competition Review by the Rugby Football Union (RFU). London Scottish Lions are the 2024–25 champions.

== Structure and format ==
The twelve teams play home and away matches from September through to April, making a total of twenty-two matches each. The results of the matches contribute points to the league as follows:

- 4 points are awarded for a win
- 2 points are awarded for a draw
- 0 points are awarded for a loss, however
- 1 losing (bonus) point is awarded to a team that loses a match by 7 points or fewer
- 1 additional (bonus) point is awarded to a team scoring 4 tries or more in a match

There is one automatic promotion place and two relegation places. The first-placed team at the end of season wins promotion to either Regional 1 South Central or Regional 1 South East.

== 2026-27 ==
Departing were Brunel University promoted to Regional 1 South Central while Windsor (11th) and Oxford Harlequins II (12th) were relegated to Counties 1 Southern North.

Team	Ground	Capacity	City/Area	Previous season
Amersham & Chiltern	Weedon Lane		Amersham, Buckinghamshire	Relegated from Regional 1 South East (10th - playoff losers)
Aylesbury	Ostler's Field		Weston Turville, Aylesbury, Buckinghamshire	5th
Beaconsfield	Oak Lodge Meadow		Beaconsfield, Buckinghamshire	Runners-up
Belsize Park	Regent's Park		Belsize Park, London	4th
Ealing Trailfinders 1871	Trailfinders Sports Ground	4,000	West Ealing, London	Promoted from Counties 1 Middlesex (champions)
Grasshoppers	Syon Lane		Isleworth, London	9th
H.A.C.	King's House Sports Ground		Chiswick, London	Level transfer from Regional 2 Anglia (runners-up)
Harpenden	Redbourn Lane		Harpenden, Hertfordshire	8th
London Irish Wild Geese	Hazelwood	2,000	Sunbury-on-Thames, Surrey	10th
Marlow	Riverwoods Drive		Marlow, Buckinghamshire	6th
Old Priorians	Perivale		Greenford, London	3rd
Teddington	Udney Park Sports Ground		Teddington, London	7th

Locations of the 2026-27 Regional 2 Thames teams in Greater London
Locations of the 2026-27 Regional 2 Thames teams in Surrey, Buckinghamshire & Hertfordshire

== 2025–26 ==
Departing were London Scottish Lions promoted to Regional 1 South Central while Hemel Hempstead (11th) and Old Haberdashers (12th) were relegated to Counties 1 Hertfordshire and Counties 1 Middlesex respectively. Also leaving were H.A.C. (runners-up) on a level transfer to Regional 2 Anglia.

Team	Ground	Capacity	City/Area	Previous season
Aylesbury	Ostler's Field		Weston Turville, Aylesbury, Buckinghamshire	10th
Beaconsfield	Oak Lodge Meadow		Beaconsfield, Buckinghamshire	4th
Belsize Park	Regent's Park		Belsize Park, London	3rd
Brunel University	Brunel University Sports Park		Uxbridge, London	Promoted from Counties 1 Herts/Middlesex (champions)
Grasshoppers	Syon Lane		Isleworth, London	7th
Harpenden	Redbourn Lane		Harpenden, Hertfordshire	Relegated from Regional 1 South East (11th)
London Irish Wild Geese	Hazelwood	2,000	Sunbury-on-Thames, Surrey	5th
Marlow	Riverwoods Drive		Marlow, Buckinghamshire	9th
Old Priorians	Perivale		Greenford, London	6th
Oxford Harlequins II	Horspath Sports Ground	1,000	Horspath, Oxfordshire	Promoted from Counties 1 Southern North (champions)
Teddington	Udney Park Sports Ground		Teddington, London	8th
Windsor	Home Park		Windsor, Berkshire	Promoted from Counties 1 Southern North (runners-up)

Locations of the 2025–26 Regional 2 Thames teams in Greater London
Locations of the 2025–26 Regional 2 Thames teams in Surrey, Berkshire, Buckinghamshire, Oxfordshire & Hertfordshire

== 2024–25 ==
Departing were Amersham & Chiltern, promoted to Regional 1 South East whilst Fullerians were relegated to Counties 1 Herts/Middlesex. Also leaving were Chobham on a level transfer to Regional 2 South Central. Replacing them were London Irish Wild Geese returning to the league on a level transfer from Regional 2 South Central together with London Scottish Lions promoted from Counties 1 Herts/Middlesex, Teddington promoted from Counties 1 Surrey/Sussex and Beaconsfield from Counties 1 Southern North. With three departing and four joining, the league was restored to twelve teams.

Team	Ground	Capacity	City/Area	Previous season
Aylesbury	Ostler's Field		Weston Turville, Aylesbury, Buckinghamshire	10th
Beaconsfield	Oak Lodge Meadow		Beaconsfield, Buckinghamshire	Promoted from Counties 1 Southern North (champions)
Belsize Park	Regent's Park		Belsize Park, London	2nd
Grasshoppers	Syon Lane		Isleworth, London	6th
H.A.C.	Artillery Ground		Finsbury, London	3rd
Hemel Hempstead	Chaulden Lane		Hemel Hempstead, Hertfordshire	5th
Marlow	Riverwoods Drive		Marlow, Buckinghamshire	9th
Old Haberdashers	Croxdale Road		Borehamwood, Hertfordshire	8th
Old Priorians	Perivale		Greenford, London	4th
London Irish Wild Geese	Hazelwood	2,000	Sunbury-on-Thames, Surrey	Level transfer from Regional 2 South Central (5th)
London Scottish Lions	King's House Sports Ground		Chiswick, London	Promoted from Counties 1 Herts / Mdx (champions)
Teddington	Udney Park Sports Ground		Teddington, London	Promoted from Counties 1 Sur / Ssx (champions)

Locations of the 2024–25 Regional 2 Thames teams in Greater London
Locations of the 2024–25 Regional 2 Thames teams in Surrey, Buckinghamshire & Hertfordshire

=== League table ===
Regional 2 Thames 2024–25
	Team	Played	Won	Drawn	Lost	Points for	Points against	Points diff	Try bonus	Loss bonus	Points
1	London Scottish Lions (P)	22	19	0	3	854	376	478	19	2	97
2	Honourable Artillery Company	22	18	0	4	732	289	443	16	4	92
3	Belsize Park	22	17	0	5	691	468	223	13	3	84
4	Beaconsfield	22	13	0	9	679	583	96	13	4	69
5	London Irish Wild Geese	22	13	0	9	638	572	66	13	3	68
6	Old Priorians	22	12	0	10	620	609	11	15	3	66
7	Grasshoppers	22	10	0	12	679	662	17	14	4	58
8	Teddington	22	8	0	14	572	724	−152	13	4	49
9	Marlow	22	8	0	14	488	687	−199	13	3	48
10	Aylesbury	22	5	0	17	566	879	−313	14	6	40
11	Hemel Hempstead (R)	22	5	0	17	488	866	−378	9	5	34
12	Old Haberdashers (R)	22	4	0	18	456	748	−292	9	8	33
If teams are level at any stage, tiebreakers are applied in the following order: 1. Number of matches won 2. Number of draws 3. Difference between points for and against 4. Total number of points for 5. Aggregate number of points scored in matches between tied teams 6. Number of matches won excluding the first match, then the second and so on until the tie is settled
Green background is the promotion place. Pink background are the relegation places. Updated: 31 August 2025; Source:

== 2023–24 ==
Leaving the league were Hammersmith & Fulham, promoted to Regional 1 South Central whilst Beaconsfield and Windsor were relegated to Counties 1 Southern North. Also departing were Cobham and London Cornish on a level transfer to Regional 2 South East as did London Irish Wild Geese to Regional 2 South Central

In their place came Chobham promoted from Counties 1 Surrey/Sussex, Hemel Hempstead and Grasshoppers, both promoted from Counties 1 Herts/Middlesex, and Marlow promoted from Counties 1 Southern North whilst H.A.C. joined on a level transfer from Regional 2 Anglia.

Leighton Buzzard had joined on a level transfer from Regional 2 Midlands East (10th in 2022-23) but after conceding numerous walkovers withdrew leaving the league with just eleven sides.

Team	Ground	Capacity	City/Area	Previous season
Amersham & Chiltern	Weedon Lane		Amersham, Buckinghamshire	2nd
Aylesbury	Ostler's Field		Weston Turville, Aylesbury, Buckinghamshire	7th
Belsize Park	Regent's Park		Belsize Park, London	9th
Chobham	Fowlers Well		Chobham, Surrey	Promoted Counties 1 Sur/Ssx (champions)
Fullerians	Coningsby Drive		Watford, Hertfordshire	8th
Grasshoppers	Syon Lane		Isleworth, London	Promoted from Counties 1 Herts/Mdx (2nd)
H.A.C.	Artillery Ground		Finsbury, London	Level transfer from Regional 2 Anglia (2nd)
Hemel Hempstead	Chaulden Lane		Hemel Hempstead, Hertfordshire	Promoted Counties 1 Herts/Mdx (champions)
~~Leighton Buzzard~~	Wright's Meadow		Leighton Buzzard, Buckinghamshire	Level transfer from Regional 2 Midlands East (10th)
Marlow	Riverwoods Drive		Marlow, Buckinghamshire	Promoted from Counties 1 Southern North (2nd)
Old Haberdashers	Croxdale Road		Borehamwood, Hertfordshire	10th
Old Priorians	Perivale		Greenford, London	4th

Locations of the 2023–24 Regional 2 Thames teams in Greater London
Locations of the 2023–24 Regional 2 Thames teams in Surrey, Buckinghamshire & Hertfordshire

=== League table ===
Regional 2 Thames 2023–24
	Team	Played	Won	Drawn	Lost	Points for	Points against	Points diff	Try bonus	Loss bonus	Points
1	Amersham & Chiltern	20	16	1	3	766	322	444	17	3	86
2	Belsize Park	20	17	0	3	689	411	278	14	2	84
3	Honourable Artillery Company	20	16	3	1	575	369	206	11	1	82
4	Old Priorians	20	11	0	9	598	468	130	10	5	59
5	Hemel Hempstead	20	9	2	9	516	584	−68	11	3	54
6	Grasshoppers	20	9	0	11	569	579	−10	13	5	54
7	Chobham	20	9	0	11	555	684	−129	14	2	52
8	Old Haberdashers	20	9	2	9	501	525	−24	6	3	49
9	Marlow	20	5	0	15	388	749	−361	6	2	28
10	Aylesbury	20	2	1	17	497	679	−182	8	8	26
R	Fullerians	20	2	1	17	342	626	−284	1	5	16
If teams are level at any stage, tiebreakers are applied in the following order: 1. Number of matches won 2. Number of draws 3. Difference between points for and against 4. Total number of points for 5. Aggregate number of points scored in matches between tied teams 6. Number of matches won excluding the first match, then the second and so on until the tie is settled
Green background is the promotion place. Pink background is the relegation place. Updated: 27 August 2024; Source:

== 2022–23 ==
This was the first season following the RFU Adult Competition Review. The league had similarities to London 2 North West but was a level higher in the English rugby pyramid being 6 not 7. Some of the teams joining would have previously played in London 2 South West being Surrey Rugby affiliated clubs. It also picked up three Berkshire RFU and Bucks RFU clubs who had historically competed in SW Division leagues.

Team	Ground	Capacity	City/Area	Previous season
Amersham & Chiltern	Weedon Lane		Amersham, Buckinghamshire	8th London 1 North
Aylesbury	Ostler's Field		Weston Turville, Aylesbury, Buckinghamshire	Promoted Southern Counties North (3rd)
Beaconsfield	Oak Lodge Meadow		Beaconsfield, Buckinghamshire	7th SW 1 East
Belsize Park	Regent's Park		Belsize Park, London	9th London 1 North
Cobham	Old Surbitonians Memorial Ground		Cobham, Surrey	7th London 1 South
Fullerians	Coningsby Drive		Watford, Hertfordshire	Promoted from London 2NW (4th)
Hammersmith & Fulham	Hurlingham Park		Fulham, London	4th London 1 South
London Cornish	Richardson Evans Memorial Playing Fields		Roehampton Vale, London	13th London 1 South
Old Haberdashers	Croxdale Road		Borehamwood, Hertfordshire	10th London 1 North
Old Priorians	Perivale		Greenford, London	Promoted from London 2NW (3rd)
London Irish Wild Geese	Hazelwood	2,000	Sunbury-on-Thames, Surrey	12th London 1 South
Windsor	Home Park		Windsor, Berkshire	11th SW 1 East

Locations of the 2022–23 Regional 2 Thames teams in Greater London
Locations of the 2022–23 Regional 2 Thames teams in Surrey, Buckinghamshire & Hertfordshire

=== League table ===
Regional 2 Thames 2022–23
	Team	Played	Won	Drawn	Lost	Points for	Points against	Points diff	Try bonus	Loss bonus	Points
1	Hammersmith & Fulham	22	18	0	4	869	348	521	17	3	92
2	Amersham & Chiltern	22	17	0	5	673	475	198	15	4	87
3	Chobham	22	16	0	6	669	528	141	14	4	82
4	Old Priorians	22	15	0	7	657	447	210	13	4	77
5	London Irish Wild Geese	22	12	0	10	530	574	−44	13	2	63
6	London Cornish	22	10	0	12	534	591	−57	13	6	59
7	Aylesbury	22	10	0	12	606	686	−80	14	5	59
8	Fullerians	21	8	1	12	460	539	−79	8	6	48
9	Belsize Park	21	8	0	13	392	506	−114	7	4	43
10	Old Haberdashers	22	8	0	14	490	616	−126	5	6	43
11	Beaconsfield	22	4	1	17	442	636	−194	5	10	33
12	Windsor	22	4	0	18	343	719	−376	5	3	24
If teams are level at any stage, tiebreakers are applied in the following order: 1. Number of matches won 2. Number of draws 3. Difference between points for and against 4. Total number of points for 5. Aggregate number of points scored in matches between tied teams 6. Number of matches won excluding the first match, then the second and so on until the tie is settled
Green background is the promotion place. Pink background is the relegation place. Updated: 1 September 2024; Source:

== Regional 2 Thames honours ==
List of Regional 2 Thames honours
Season	No of teams	Champions	Runner–up	Relegated team(s)	Ref
2022–23	12	Hammersmith & Fulham	Amersham and Chiltern	Beaconsfield and Windsor	
2023–24	11	Amersham and Chiltern	Belsize Park	Fullerians	
2024–25	12	London Scottish Lions	HAC (Honourable Artillery Company)	Hemel Hempstead and Old Haberdashers	
Green background is the promotion place.

== See also ==
- London & SE Division RFU
- Hampshire RFU
- Kent RFU
- Surrey RFU
- Sussex RFU
- English rugby union system
- Rugby union in England
