= Peter Trunkfield =

English rugby union administrator

Peter C Trunkfield (1930 – 28 December 2010) was a leading English rugby union administrator.

Born in Olney, he was a member of Marlow Rugby Club and the Buckinghamshire Rugby Union, he served as President of the Rugby Football Union in 1998–1999, having previously served as vice president to Peter Brook. For over twenty years he acted as a popular liaison officer for touring teams from the southern hemisphere. He was a former Bletchley player.
