= Berks/Bucks & Oxon Premier A =

English rugby union league

- Sport: Rugby Union
- Number of teams: 13
- Country: England

Berks, Bucks and Oxon Premier A was an English rugby union league featuring teams from Berkshire, Buckinghamshire and Oxfordshire.

== Berks/Bucks & Oxon Premier A Honours ==
Berks/Bucks & Oxon Premier A Honours
Season	No of Teams	Champions	Runners–up	Relegated Teams	League Name
2005-06	9	Chinnor II	Oxford Harlequins II	Olney 2nd XV	Berks/Bucks & Oxon Premier A
2006-07	12	Oxford Harlequins II	Maidenhead II	Aylesbury II, High Wycombe II	Berks/Bucks & Oxon Premier A
2007-08	12	Redingensians II	Maidenhead II (Note: Maidenhead II would transfer to the Canterbury Shield League the following season.)	Bletchley II	Berks/Bucks & Oxon Premier A
2008-09	12	Wallingford II	Witney II	Bracknell III, Henley Wanderers II	Berks/Bucks & Oxon Premier A
2009-10	14	Windsor II	Oxford Harlequins II	Bicester II, High Wycombe II	Berks/Bucks & Oxon Premier A
2010-11	13	Henley III	Witney II	No relegation	Berks/Bucks & Oxon Premier A (Note: This would be the last season for the Berks/Bucks & Oxon Premier A league. Teams would be transferred to the newly created Berks/Bucks & Oxon 1 or Berks/Bucks & Oxon 2 for the following season depending on final league position.)
Green backgrounds are promotion places.

== See also ==
- English Rugby Union Leagues
- English rugby union system
- Rugby union in England
