= Amersham and Chiltern Rugby =

English rugby union club, based in Amersham, Buckinghamshire

(England) Amersham & Chiltern RFC
- Full name: Amersham and Chiltern Rugby Football Club
- Union: Buckinghamshire RFU
- Founded: 1924; 102 years ago (as Chiltern Wanderers)
- Location: Amersham
- Region: Buckinghamshire
- Ground: Ash Grove
- Chairman: Andy Saunders
- President: Andrew Grant
- Coach: James Love
- Captain: Jack Kenyon
- League: [[Regional 2 South East Thames
- 2026. - 2027: 1st
Team kit

Official website
- chilternrugby.com

Amersham and Chiltern RFC is an English rugby union team located in Amersham, Buckinghamshire, England. Founded as Chiltern Wanderers in 1924, the club changed their name to Amersham and Chiltern RFC in 1992. They are a member of Buckinghamshire Rugby Football Union. They currently play in Regional 2 Thames following their relegation in the play offs from Regional 1 South East in season 2025 - 2026 The 2nd XV play in Counties 2 Berks, Bucks & Oxon North & the 3rd XV play socially under lights as often as possible . The club colours are claret and white.

== History ==
Chiltern Rugby Club was formed on 20 December 1924 when a meeting was called to the house of Eric Redfern, "By The Way", Clifton Road, Chesham Bois. It was to serve the expanding unities of Amersham and Chesham. The first game was played against Berkhamsted School Old Boys XV on Boxing Day, 26 December 1924. The first home grounds were a site behind the Pineapple Public House in White Lion Road, Amersham Common together with a field in Cokes Lane, until the Copperkins Lane ground was leased from the Shardeloes estate in 1929. The ground, with two pitches and a new pavilion was formally opened at the start the 1929–30 season with a game against West Herts F.C. The 1st XV has seen success recently by being promoted for successive seasons and reaching the National Leagues. Success at age group rugby has also been seen with the Under-17's winning the National Plate in the 2013–14 season. World Cup winner Josh Lewsey played at Amersham and Chiltern from a young age. In the 2011–12 season the club won silverware from Under-13 to senior level.

== 1st XV league history ==
Season	League	Level	Position
2006–07	Southern Counties North	RFU Level 7	5th
2007–08	Southern Counties North	RFU Level 7	11th (relegated)
2008–09	Berks Bucks Oxon Premier	RFU Level 8	2nd (promoted)
2009–10	Southern Counties North	RFU Level 7	2nd (promoted)
2010–11	South West 1	RFU Level 6	1st (promoted)
2011–12	National 3 South West	RFU Level 5	11th
2012–13	National 3 South West	RFU Level 5	8th
2013–14	National 3 South West	RFU Level 5	5th
2014–15	National 3 London & SE	RFU Level 5	13th (relegated)
2015–16	London 1 North	RFU Level 6	1st (promoted)
2016–17	National 3 London & SE	RFU Level 5	14th (relegated)
2017–18	London 1 North	RFU Level 6	4th
2018–19	London 1 North	RFU Level 6	7th
2019–20	London 1 North	RFU Level 6	11th
2020–21	London 1 North	RFU Level 6	

== Honours ==
1st team:

- Bucks/Oxon 1 champions (2): 1988–89, 1993–94
- Southern Counties champions: 1995–96
- Southern Counties (north v south) promotion playoff winners (2): 2003–04, 2009–10
- South West Division 1 East champions: 2010–11
- London 1 North champions: 2015–16
- Regional 2 Thames champions: 2023–24

2nd team:

- Berks/Bucks & Oxon 1 champions: 2013–14

3rd team:

- Berks/Bucks & Oxon 2 North champions: 2008–09
- Berks/Bucks & Oxon 1 North champions: 2009–10
- Berks/Bucks & Oxon 3 North champions: 2012–13
- Berks/Bucks & Oxon 2 champions: 2013–14

== Notable former players ==
Name	Honours
Josh Lewsey (England)	London Wasps, England & British & Irish Lions
Alan Simmons (England)	London Wasps, England & Barbarians
Will Porter (England)	Harlequins RFC, England A
