= Chris Sheasby =

England international rugby union player

- Born: Christopher Mark Andrew Sheasby; 30 November 1966 (age 59) Windsor, Berkshire, England
- Height: 6 ft 1.5 in (1.867 m)
- Weight: 232 lb (105 kg)
- School: Radley College
- University: King's College London; Cambridge University

Rugby union career
- Position: No.8
Senior career
Years	Team	Apps	(Points)
- London Wasps
–	Harlequins		
–	London Irish		
- Correct as of 11 Sept 2006
International career
Years	Team	Apps	(Points)
1996-97	England	7	(5)
- Correct as of 4 April 2010
National sevens team
Years	Team		Comps
1993	England		1993 Sevens World Cup

Chris Sheasby (born 30 November 1966 in Windsor, Berkshire) is an English former international rugby union player, commentator and coach.

== Biography ==
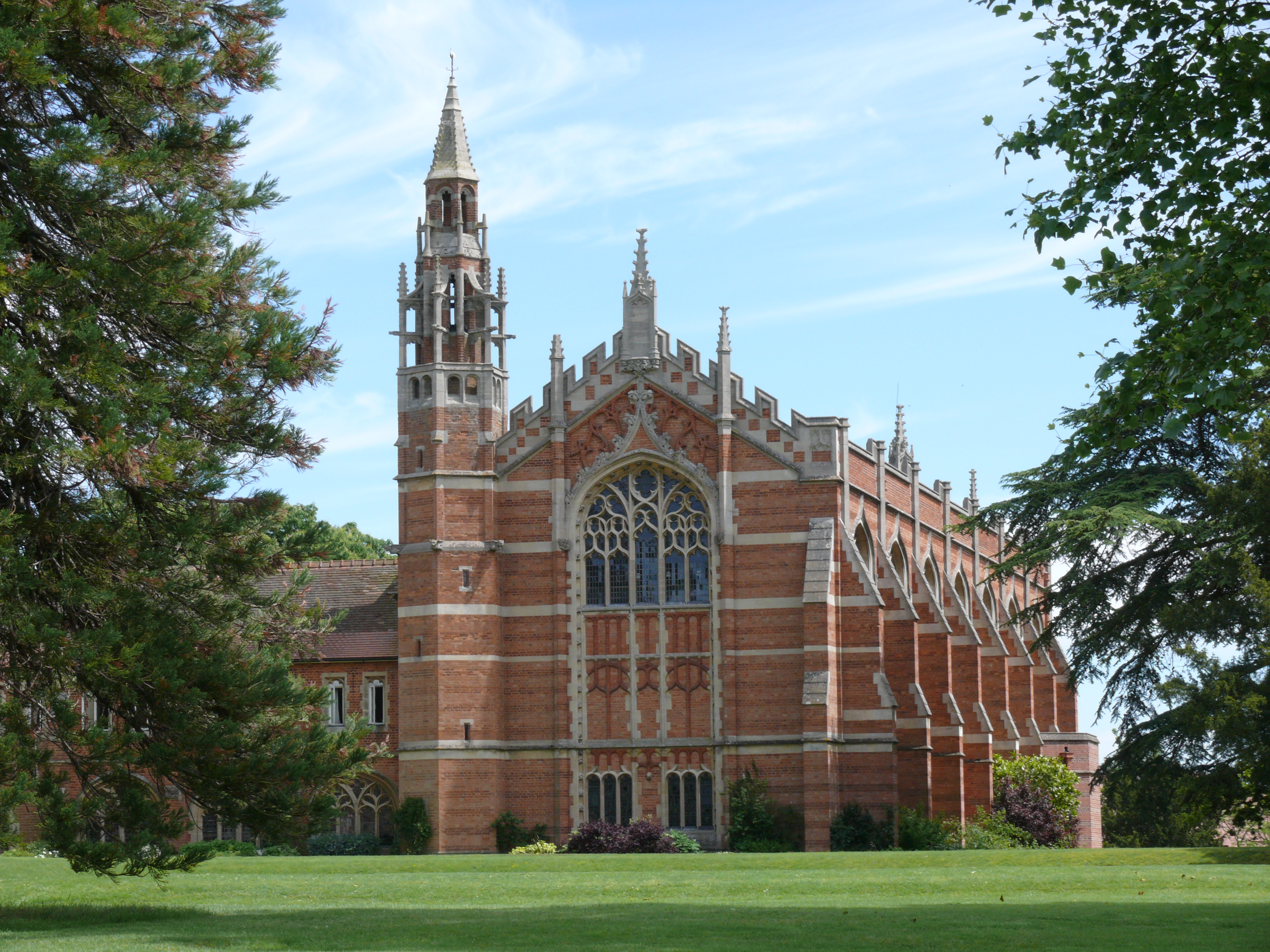
Radley College

Sheasby was educated at Radley College, King's College London where he graduated in Mathematics in 1989, and at the University of Cambridge.

=== Club career ===
He played No.8 in a rugby career with London Wasps, Harlequins and London Irish. He started in the 2002 Powergen Cup Final at Twickenham, as London Irish defeated the Northampton Saints.

=== International career ===
During the course of his career he secured seven caps for England and scored a try on his debut against Italy. He also had a place in the England rugby union Sevens squad that won the Sevens World Cup in 1993.

=== Post-retirement ===
Sheasby has also coached Staines R.F.C., Bracknell R.F.C., got his sharp elbows out for Effingham & Leatherhead RFC and most recently acted as player/coach for Marlow Rugby Club. He also featured as head coach of UCS Old Boys where he left after a single game.

=== Personal life ===
Sheasby was married to former British pole vaulter Kate Staples, also known as Zodiac from the television show Gladiators, but separated in 2011 and divorced in 2016. Sheasby is stepfather to Staples' daughter Ella with fellow Gladiator Trojan, Mark Griffin; and the couple have two other children, two boys Kai and Luca. The family lived in Esher, Surrey.
