= Paul Burnell =

British Lions & Scotland international rugby union player

- Born: Andrew Paul Burnell; 29 September 1965 (age 61) Edinburgh, Scotland
- Height: 6 ft 1 in (1.85 m)
- Weight: 17 st 2 lb (108 kg)

Rugby union career
- Position: Prop
Amateur team(s)
Years	Team	Apps	(Points)
- Marlow
Senior career
Years	Team	Apps	(Points)
1986–1988	Leicester Tigers	13	(8)
?-1999	London Scottish		
Provincial / State sides
Years	Team	Apps	(Points)
- Scottish Exiles
International career
Years	Team	Apps	(Points)
1989	Scotland 'B'	1	
1989-1999	Scotland	52	(5)
1993	British & Irish Lions	1	(0)

Paul Burnell (born 29 September 1965) is a former Scotland international rugby union player. He was also a member of the 1990 Grand Slam Scotland team. He toured New Zealand in 1993 with the British & Irish Lions and at the time played club rugby for London Scottish.

Burnell was born in Edinburgh and educated at Reading Blue Coat School. Whilst studying in Leicester he played rugby for Stoneygate FC, he was kept in the 4th XV 'to improve his rugby education' as his captain put it. Burnell played 13 games for Leicester Tigers between 1986 and 1988.

Burnell made his international début versus England at Twickenham on 4 February 1989 a match the sides drew 12-12. His only international try was against The Ivory Coast in the 1995 Rugby World Cup. He ran in from 70 yards dummying both wings and full back before crashing in under the posts in the 89–0 win. His final test match was against New Zealand at Murrayfield on 24 October 1999 in the World Cup knock-out stages having previously announced his intention to retire at the end of the tournament.

Burnell is London Scottish FC's most capped Scotland International player with 52 caps and represented Scotland at the 1991, 1995, 1999 World Cups while being a member of London Scottish FC. He is an inductee of the London Scottish Hall of Fame.

Formerly national sales director for waste company Biffa, Burnell joined the Waste Recycling Group (WRG) as Commercial and Industrial Director in September 2011.
