= Milton Keynes RUFC =

English rugby union club, based in Buckinghamshire

Milton Keynes Rugby Union Football Club
- Full name: Milton Keynes Rugby Union Football Club
- Union: Buckinghamshire RFU
- Nickname: Zulu Warriors
- Founded: c.1875 (as Wolverton RUFC), reformed 1958, re-named 1973
- Location: Bowland Drive, Emerson Valley, Milton Keynes, MK4 2DN, Buckinghamshire, England
- Ground: Stade EV
- Chairman: David James
- President: John Theobald
- Coach: Chris 'Monners' Monaghan
- Captain: Ollie Anderson
- League: Counties 2 Tribute Berks/Bucks & Oxon North
- 2022–23: 6th

Milton Keynes RUFC is a rugby union club from Milton Keynes, founded as Wolverton RUFC.

== History ==
Originally, Wolverton Rugby Club was founded in the mid 1870s and carried on until the First World War. It was then left in limbo until some time after the Second World War. The club was reformed on 22 January 1958 when the Scout Hall in Wolverton was hired for a mere 7/6d (37 V2p). A number of people attended the first meeting, thus forming the Wolverton Rugby Club. A committee was formed and three games arranged for the end of that season. Shirts were scrounged from various sources and dyed black. The next season, the club had a pitch and posts supplied by the council in the Wolverton Recreation Ground, with changing and bath facilities in the Railway Works Baths. Teas were taken in the Craufurd Arms, which was also the club's headquarters.

Eventually proper black shirts with white collars were donated by Vice-Presidents after much fundraising, and it was even possible to go away with a full squad of fifteen players. (Previously, at one match, a coach driver and two spectators had to be dragged onto the pitch at Old Dunstablians to make up the team.) In 1965, Hodges Furze, the allotments at the back of Windsor Street in Wolverton, were leased by the club from the Radcliffe Trustees, and Marstons brewery loaned the Club some money. The land was ploughed, seeded, mole drained and stones removed to make the new grounds. A second-hand hut was purchased and fitted up with changing rooms, bath, toilets and, of course, a bar.

Jeff Butterfield was then asked by W H Weston, the President and former England International, to perform the official opening on 27 March 1968. At this time, Milton Keynes was just a village, but there were rumours of a new city being developed, so the club had to think again. Jeff Butterfield became president, and held that position until he died in May 2004. The name of the club was changed in 1974 to Milton Keynes in the light of the development of the new city, and a new ground was provided in Greenleys. Once again the Marstons brewery came up with a loan to build the current clubhouse with help from a sponsored run to Twickenham Stadium, where the team was pictured on TV handing over the match ball for the All Blacks game in 1973.

Wolverton RUFC changed its name in 1973 to Milton Keynes RUFC, based in Greenleys.

Milton Keynes Under-16s won the 1985 East Midlands U-16s Sevens tournament at Wellingborough, beating Stuart and Lloyd's 12-4 in the final with only six men for most of the game after prop Clive Rhodes was sent off in the first minute.

In March 2006, Milton Keynes RUFC won the Bucks Plate against Slough RUFC who are in the league above. Milton Keynes went on to finish as runners up in the Berks, Bucks and Oxon Premier League and were promoted to Southern Counties North. The Club has over 400 members including a mini and junior section with players between the ages of 6 and 18. Milton Keynes Under 15s were 2009/10 County Cup Champions and First Division Champions with 5 players playing for Buckinghamshire. Two players play for Wasps Academy and one player plays for England Under 16's..

In April 2011, the club transferred to a new ground in Emerson Valley. The move was opposed by the local community, but planning permission was granted on 6 September 2007.

== Reserve and Junior teams ==
The club fields numerous other sides apart from the 1st XV:

=== Reserve ===
- 2nd XV
- 3rd XV

=== Junior ===
- Under 18s
- Colts
- MKRUFC Junior Ladies (MadCows)
- Under 17s
- Under 16s
- Under 15s
- Under 14s
- Under 13s
- Under 12s
- Under 11s
- Under 10s
- Under 9s
- Under 8s
- Under 7s
- Super 6

=== Other ===
- Touch Rugby

== Honours ==
East-Midlands under-16s Sevens Winners 1985

2nd team:

- Berks/Bucks & Oxon 1 North champions: 2007–08
