= Reading R.F.C. =

English rugby union club, based in Berkshire

(England) Reading RFC
- Full name: Reading Rugby Football Club
- Union: Berkshire RFU
- Nickname: The Green Machine
- Founded: 1898; 128 years ago
- Ground: Holme Park
- Top scorer: Alex Dorliac
- League: Counties 1 Southern North
- 2024–25: 9th
1st kit	2nd kit

Official website
- readingrugby.club

Reading R.F.C. is an English rugby union club, which runs a total of 21 sides across men's, women's, girls' and junior rugby and is based in the village of Sonning, on the outskirts of Reading. The 1st XV play in Counties 1 Southern North. They additionally play Walking Rugby which is a more accessible version of the game.

== History ==
Reading was originally formed as 'Berkshire Wanderers' in July 1898 when RFU President Roger Walker, RFU Secretary George Rowland Hill and Cambridge Blue G R Joyce held a meeting in Pangbourne. Their aim was to set up a rugby club in Reading and the first game was played at the County Cricket Ground, Kensington Road, in September 1898. The club led a nomadic existence until, shortly before World War II, they moved to their present headquarters at Holme Park, Sonning. The club's name was changed to Reading in 1956 and the first trophy was won in 1970 when Marlow were beaten 16–3 at Maidenhead in the inaugural Berkshire Cup Final.

In the 1970s, Reading went into decline as Maidenhead and then Abbey became predominant in Berkshire. However, a successful colts side, organised by the late John Silverthorne, formed the basis of a revival following a disastrous 1982–83 season in which only one game was won.

Coach Jeff Owen and skipper Ian Turrell joined forces in the early 1980s and through their emphasis on forward power, Reading became known as "The Green Machine". The Berkshire Cup was won for the second time in 1986 and then regularly until the Wanderers – the 2nd XV – won it for a record tenth time, beating Bracknell in the final. The Southern Merit Table was also won six times in less than a decade. In the 1986–87 season, the team won 30 out of 34 matches and also reached the third round of the John Player Cup, running Coventry, then amongst the country's elite, very close before going down 26–12.

When the leagues started in 1987, Reading were placed in South West Division Two and lost their first league game at home to Berry Hill. Nevertheless, they finished second in the league and were promoted. Three successive promotions under Mike Tewkesbury's guidance from 1992–93 took Reading into the country's top thirty teams. Reading played five seasons at this level, peaking at a final position of 6th, but by the time Tewkesbury left in 1999 problems were already apparent, as successive financial cuts had depleted the squad. Successive relegations took the side back into South West Division One.

However, with Alastair McHarg and Dick Michael at the helm, steady progress was made over the next three seasons, culminating in promotion to National Division 3 South in 2004. The 2004–05 season started badly, with defeat in the hot sunshine at Hertford, but it ended entertainingly with a 50–28 win against old rivals Lydney and a creditable sixth place. The 2005–06 season started in much the same way with early defeats and many team changes due to injuries. However, there was no revival after Christmas as opportunities were missed in consecutive weeks for wins over Rosslyn Park and Southend which saw Reading return to South West Division 1. The worst moments for the team and supporters were the defeats at relegation rivals Bracknell and Old Patesians.

The 2006–07 season saw an end of season upsurge in form with Reading finishing fifth in the table.

The 2007–08 season saw them relegated to South West Division Two where they were originally placed when leagues started in 1987.

The 2008–09 season saw them promoted again but this was short lived as they were relegated once more in season 2009–10.

The 2009–10 season has the team finishing 5th in the South West 1 East Division.

The 2010–11 season saw another mid table finish of 6th place.

== Honours ==
Men's 1st XV:

- 1970 First winners of Berkshire County Cup
- Courage National Division 5 South champions: 1993–94
- South West Division 1 champions: 2003–04
- South West 2 (east v west) promotion play-off winner: 2008–09
- Tribute Southern Counties North: 2021-22

Men's 2nd XV:

- Berks/Bucks & Oxon 2 South champions: 2008–09
- Wadworth 6X Berks/Bucks & Oxon 2 South: 2017–18

Men's 3rd XV:

- Berks/Bucks & Oxon 2 South: 2010–11
- Berks/Bucks & Oxon 3 South: 2018–19

Men's 4th XV:

- Berks/Bucks & Oxon 5 champions: 2011–12
- Berks/Bucks & Oxon 4 South champions: 2013–14

== Men's rugby ==
The first team squad is amateur, the club also field a 2nd (Wanderers), 3rd (Vikings) & 5th (Saxons) team. The club have an over-35s squad (4th team), the "Rhinos".

=== Men's 1st XV previous seasons ===
2000–01—2009–10

Season	League	Finish	Number of teams
2000–01			
2001–02	South West 1	4th	12
2002–03	South West 1	2nd	12
2003–04	South West 1	1st	12
2004–05	National League Three South	6th	14
2005–06	National League Three South	13th	14
2006–07	South West 1	5th	9
2007–08	South West 1	10th	12
2008–9	South West 2 East	2nd	12
2009–10	National League 3 South West	12th	14

2010–11—2019–20

Season	League	Finish	Number of Teams
2010–11	South West 1 East	6th	14
2011–12	South West 1 East	6th	14
2012-–3	South West 1 East	3rd	14
2013–14	South West 1 East	9th	14
2014–15	South West 1 East	9th	14
2015–16	South West 1 East	11th	14
2016–17	South West 1 East	14th	14
2017–18	Wadworth 6X Southern Counties North	7th	14
2018–19	Wadworth 6X Southern Counties North	8th	12
2019–20	Wadworth Southern Counties North	2nd	12

2020–21-

Season	League	Finish	Number of Teams
2020–21	COVID-19		
2021–22	Tribute Southern Counties North	2nd	12
2022–23	Regional 2 Tribute South Central	6th	12
2023–24	Regional 2 South Central	12th	12
2024–25	Counties 1 Tribute Southern North	TBC	12

== Women's rugby ==
"Reading Ladies" are now a well-established team, playing regular Sunday fixtures against teams throughout the region. On 2 January 2008, a combined Berkshire and Buckinghamshire side played Canada U19s at RRFC. The half-time score was 19–5 to the visitors with the Canadian women's under-19 side eventually winning 41–5.

Reading under-15s girls and under-18s girls make up most of the Berkshire County sides and recently have had two England International girls and one Scotland International girl making the squads from Reading RFC.

In 2014–15 the under-18 Berkshire Barbarians girls side (combined Newbury RFC & Reading RFC) won the National 15's title as well as the Wasp's 10's Worthing 10's and National 7's titles

In 2016 The Berkshire Barbarians became Reading & Newbury girls and then in Sep 2017 the cluster fully split leaving Reading RFC as a standalone girls club. In 2018–19 the U18 Team won the Area2 Cup by beating London Scottish U18 Girls making it the national Semi finals where they lost to Pulborough the eventual winners. The U15 team were beaten at the Area Semi Final stage. At the 2019 Worthing 10's the U15's were runners up to OA's and the U18's won the cup narrowly beating Dorchester.

2 U18 players represented England U18 Girls vs Emerging Wales during 2019 and past players played for several Tyrell's Premiership teams.

=== Women's 1st XV previous seasons ===
2010/11-2019/20

Season	League	Finish	Number of Teams
2010-11	RFUW Championship South West 2	3rd	8
2011-12	RFUW Championship South West 2	6th	7
2012-13	Women's Championship South West 2	5th	7
2013-14	Women's Championship South West 2	6th	9
2014-15	Women's Championship South West 2	8th	8
2015-16	Women's NC South East West 1	4th	9
2016-17	Women's NC South East West 1	4th	8
2017-18	Women's NC South East West 1	4th	8
2018-19	Women's NC South East West 1	6th	8
2019-20	Women's NC 1 South East (North)	5th	8

2020/21-

Season	League	Finish	Number of Teams
2020-21	COVID-19		
2021-22	Women's NC 1 South West (East)	8th	9
2022-23	Women's NC 1 South East (West)	3rd	10
2023-24	Women's NC 1 South West (East)	4th	8
2024-25	Women's NC 1 South West (East)	TBC	7

== Youth rugby ==
Reading have seen a resurgence in youth rugby and now have representative teams in all age categories (under7s to under 11s). Youth rugby for boys is played on Sunday mornings, with teams for age grades from under-12s to Colts. Reading also has a girls section with teams playing on Sunday afternoons at under-12s, 14s, 16s, and 18s, as well as a senior women's team, the Kites.

Reading Rugby Club also has the highest level of RFU accreditation with the RFU Whole Club Seal of Approval award on top of its Mini/Midi Seal of Approval Level 3, along with Club Mark and Sport England.

== Past players (men) ==
- Ayoola Erinle
- Tom Johnson

== Past players (women) ==
- Abby Dow
- Alex Matthews
- Victoria Laflin
- Ella Cromack
- Millie David
