= Reading Abbey R.F.C. =

English rugby union club, based in Oxfordshire

Coordinates: 51°29′34.23″N 0°57′43.69″W

Reading Abbey
- Full name: Reading Abbey Rugby Football Club
- Union: Berkshire RFU
- Nickname: Abbey
- Founded: 1956; 70 years ago
- Ground(s): Rosehill; Emmer Green; Reading; Berkshire; RG4 8XA
- Chairman: Sam Wallis Robinson
- President: Gordon Wylie
- League: Counties 1 Southern North
- 2024–25: 6th
Team kit

Official website
- readingabbeyrfc.rfu.club

Reading Abbey R.F.C is an English rugby union club. Although the club is named after, and historically connected with, the Berkshire town of Reading, it is now located between Reading and Peppard and just over the boundary into the county of Oxfordshire.

Reading Abbey was born in the early 1950s as a youth side meeting the playing demand of boys who went to non-rugby playing schools. As a consequence when they wanted adult rugby they were uncomfortable with the established hierarchy at the two clubs in town. So in 1956 they formed Abbey RFC and played in the Town's public park moving from pub to pub for changing and post match refreshments.

By 1971 life had become more heterogeneous and the club scraped together the wherewithal to buy 22 acres of ground and by their own efforts three pitches and a clubhouse were built. With all the energy released by the change of venue and an ever-growing membership, it rapidly established itself as a leading club in the area for adult and youth rugby, three of whom have represented England at various youth levels.

League rugby saw Abbey start in South West 1 East with a declared policy of amateurism aiming to cultivate rugby within the community; membership has thrived and leading it to adopt the name Reading Abbey. Its playing fortunes have been equally stable for, bar a couple of years in one level below and one level above, Abbey has remained at the same level at which it entered the leagues.

Abbey currently play four senior teams as well as a colts and a vets team. The first team and second team train together as a squad on Tuesdays and Thursday nights and the third team and fourth team train together as a development squad on Thursdays. All the senior teams, apart from the colts, play their matches on Saturday with the colts playing on Sundays. The first team play in South West 1 East, second team play in Berks/Bucks & Oxon Premier A and the Berkshire Cup, the thirds play in the Thames Valley Invitational League Division A and the colts play in the English Colts Club Knockout Cup and the OBB Colts Division one.

Every Sunday the club is taken over by the mini and junior rugby. Mini's rugby is from under-5s to under-12s. They play in their age groups, mainly working on their core rugby skills and playing in semi-competitive friendly matches against other clubs. The juniors, who are under-13s to under-17s, train on Wednesday evenings and play matches on Sundays.

Women's and girls' rugby is a growing force at Abbey. Each Sunday Abbey hosts a girls only training session for girls from 8 to 11 with an open door policy where any age girl can come and not be turned away. The women's team play as Abbey Nuns and train Monday and Wednesday night. Having been promoted after their first season in a league, the Nuns now compete in Women's National Challenge (NC) South East West 1 league from the 2016–17 season.

== Honours ==
1st team:

- South West Division 2 East champions: 2004–05
- Berks/Bucks & Oxon Premier champions: 2014–15
- Southern Counties North champions: 2015–16

3rd team:

- Berks/Bucks & Oxon 4 South champions: 2015–16

4th team

- Berks/Bucks & Oxon 4 South champions: 2016-17 (Note: Despite winning the 2016–17 Berks/Bucks & Oxon 4 South Reading Abbey IV were not promoted as Reading Abbey III were in the division above.)

Abbey Nuns:

- Women's National Challenge (NC) South East West 2 champions: 2014–15
- Berkshire Women's Festival Plate Champions: 2016
- Bristol 7s Champions: 2016
- West County 7s Champions: 2016

U13s:

- Berkshire Cup winners 2019
- Berkshire Development Cup winners 2019
