= Chinnor R.F.C. =

English rugby union club, based in Oxfordshire

(England) Chinnor
- Full name: Chinnor Rugby Football Club
- Union: RFU
- Nickname: The Villagers
- Founded: 1962; 64 years ago
- Region: Oxfordshire Rugby Football Union
- Ground(s): Kingsey Road, Thame (Capacity: 3,000 (560 seats))
- Chairman: Nick Stainton
- President: Simon Vickers
- Director of Rugby: Nick Easter
- Coach(es): Craig Hampson, Tom Cruse
- Captain: Willie Ryan
- League: Champ Rugby
- 2025–26: 5th of 14 (lost play-off quarter-final)
1st kit	2nd kit

Official website
- chinnor-rfc.com

Chinnor Rugby Football Club is an English rugby union club based in Thame, Oxfordshire. They currently play in the second tier of the English league system, Champ Rugby, following their promotion from National League 1 having won promotion in the 2023–24 season. The club regularly runs five senior teams as well as a full youth setup from age 5 upwards. Chinnor's youth setup is widely thought of as one of the best in the country having produced top Premiership players such as Tom Varndell (Leicester Tigers), Tom Johnson (Exeter Chiefs), Dave Seymour (Saracens), Paul Volley (Wasps), and Sam Jones (Wasps). Chinnor became the first club in Oxfordshire or Buckinghamshire to establish an under-19 academy.

== History ==
Chinnor RFC was formed in 1962, by Frank Angel, Cyril Perry and Marcus Cann at the Bird in Hand pub in Chinnor, playing its first game the following year. Norman Baldwin (the sponge) was one of the first to play for Chinnor and wrote the club's first “song book”. The 1970s saw the club expand to include junior and youth teams and in 1976 the club won the Oxfordshire Cup. When the English league system started the club was placed in Bucks and Oxon Division 1 and progressed through the Southern Counties section to gain promotion to the National Leagues in 2006; the youngest club to do so. The club gained a further promotion from National League 3 South West in 2012.

During the 2016–17 National League 2 South season, the club achieved a (then) record attendance at Kingsey Road of 1,580 during a top of the table clash against Bishop's Stortford, a game Chinnor won 27–25.

On 13 April 2024, Chinnor beat Birmingham Moseley to take the National League 1 title with a game to go. During this season, the club also smashed the previous Kingsey Road attendance with 2,270 spectators attending the top of the league clash with rivals Rams on 15 December 2023, which would also be the best attended game in National League 1 that season.

== Ground ==
Chinnor originally played at the Towersey Playing Fields in the village of Towersey being granted a 25-year lease in 1971 and building a club house in 1972, before moving to their current ground, Kingsey Road, 1.5 miles away in Thame in 1986.

Kingsey Road is situated on the eastern outskirts of Thame. The ground has been upgraded throughout its history with a 350 seated temporary stand added ahead of the 2024–25 season, later upgraded to a permanent 560 seater stand ahead of the 2025–26 season. Capacity is currently around 3,000, which includes 560 seated in the covered grandstand. On 21 March 2026 Chinnor's Chief Executive Simon Vickers announced plans to build a new 5,000 seater stadium to replace its existing ground.

A record crowd of 3,000 was achieved on 14 March 2026 when Kingsey Road hosted England U18 against France U18.

== Honours ==
1st team:

- Oxfordshire RFU County Cup winners (5): 1977, 1999, 2002, 2010, 2011
- Bucks/Oxon 1 champions: 1994–95
- South West 2 East champions: 2000–01
- South West 1 champions (2): 2005–06, 2007–08
- Oxfordshire Cup winners (3): 2010, 2011, 2012
- National League 3 (south-east v south-west) promotion play-off winner: 2011–12
- National League 2 (north v south) promotion play-off winner: 2017–18
- National League 1 champions: 2023–24

2nd team:

- Berks/Bucks & Oxon Premier A champions: 2005–06
- Oxfordshire RFU County Cup winners (2): 2012, 2013

3rd team:

- Berks/Bucks & Oxon 1 champions (2): 2005–06, 2016–17

== Current standings ==
2026–27 Champ Rugby table
Pos	Team	Pld	W	D	L	PF	PA	PD	TF	TA	TB	LB	Pts	Qualification
1	Worcester Warriors	6	6	0	0	277	114	+163	42	17	4	0	28	Play-off semi-finals
2	Ealing Trailfinders	6	5	0	1	287	135	+152	45	20	5	1	26	Play-off semi-finals
3	Coventry	6	5	0	1	278	188	+90	41	29	2	1	23	Play-off quarter-finals
4	Cornish Pirates	6	4	0	2	222	208	+14	33	31	3	0	19	Play-off quarter-finals
5	Chinnor	6	4	0	2	201	200	+1	31	31	1	0	17	Play-off quarter-finals
6	Rotherham Titans	6	4	0	2	181	231	−50	28	35	1	0	17	Play-off quarter-finals
7	Ampthill	6	4	0	2	210	228	−18	32	34	0	0	16	
8	Bedford Blues	6	3	0	3	188	179	+9	29	27	3	1	16	
9	Doncaster Knights	6	2	0	4	187	197	−10	28	28	1	2	11	
10	Caldy	6	1	0	5	203	239	−36	31	36	0	3	7	
11	Blackheath	6	1	0	5	165	220	−55	23	32	0	3	7	
12	Nottingham	6	1	0	5	145	227	−82	22	35	0	2	6	Relegation play-off
13	Richmond	6	1	0	5	158	221	−63	24	35	0	1	5	Relegation play-off
14	Hartpury	6	1	0	5	137	252	−115	24	35	0	1	5	Relegated

Updated to match(es) played on 1 November 2026. Source:
Rules for classification: If teams are level at any stage, tiebreakers are applied in the following order:
1. Number of matches won
2. Number of matches drawn
3. Difference between points for and against
4. Total number of points for
5. Aggregate number of points scored in matches between tied teams
6. Number of matches won excluding the first match, then the second and so on until the tie is settled

== Current squad ==
The Chinnor squad for the 2025–26 season is:

Chinnor 2025–26 Champ Rugby squad
**Props**: (South Africa) Kabous Bezuidenut; (England) Rob Hardwick; (England) Kai Owen; (Ireland) Lawson Porter; (Ireland) Alex Pybus; (Georgia (country)) Ramaz Rukhadze; **Hookers**: (England) Will Cave; (England) Chris Moore; (Ireland) Luke Thompson; (Scotland) Alun Walker; **Locks**: (South Africa) Conor-Terrah Brockschmidt; (Scotland) Jamie Campbell; (Zimbabwe) Dan Cooke; (England) Isaac Ridge	**Back row**: (New Zealand) Jamie Carr; (England) Harry Dugmore; (England) Scott Hall; (England) Joe Harman; (England) Geordie Irvine; (Scotland) Karl Main; (England) Cameron Rafferty; (England) George Stokes; (South Africa) Izzy Wharton; **Scrum-halves**: (England) Luke Carter; (England) Harry Charman; (England) Charles James-Carter; (England) Callum Pascoe; **Fly-halves**: (Scotland) Nathan Chamberlain; (New Zealand) Nick Smith; (England) George Worboys	**Centres**: (England) James Bourton; (England) Sam Hanks; (England) Morgan Passman; (England) Tom Watson; **Wings**: (England) Toby Cousins; (England) George Wacokecoke; (England) Kieran Goss; (Scotland) Grant Hughes; (Scotland) Freddie Owsley; **Fullbacks**: (England) Joe Brock
**(c)** denotes the team captain. (vc) denotes vice-captain. **Bold** denotes internationally capped players.^{ST} denotes a short-term signing. Source:
