= Bletchley RUFC =

English rugby union club, based in Bletchley, Buckinghamshire

(England) Bletchley RUFC
- Full name: Bletchley Rugby Union Football Club
- Union: Buckinghamshire RFU / East Midlands RFU
- Location: Fenny Stratford, Milton Keynes, Buckinghamshire, England
- Ground: Manor Fields
- Chairman: Verity Robinson
- President: Ian Cope
- League: Counties 1 Southern North
- 2024–25: 5th
Team kit

Bletchley Rugby Union Club is an English rugby union club from Milton Keynes who play at Manor Fields. They routinely put out three Senior XVs, a ladies side and a Vets side. The 1st XV play in Counties 1 Southern North and the 2nd XVs in the East Midlands 2 - Bedfordshire. The 3rd XV and Vets side play ad hoc friendly local fixtures.

In addition to the 120+ adult section, the club has a youth (U7s to U17s) set-up with over 200 members. In the 2005–06 season the club's U17 squad were Buckinghamshire County Cup champions, and finalists in the South West Division Bowl. The playing activities at Bletchley are supported by a large number of volunteers, including the 50+ Vice-Presidents of whom many are ex-players. Bletchley celebrated its 60th anniversary during the 2007–08 season. The men's team in the early 2010s played at level 5.

== History ==
In 2003 Bletchley RUFC were the first sports organisation in Milton Keynes/North Bucks to gain the Rugby Football Union 'Seal of Approval' and Sport England Clubmark. In 2006 the club gained Stage 2 accreditation from the same bodies.

== Honours ==
1st team:

- Bucks Cup winners: 1983–84, 1984–85
- Berks/Bucks & Oxon 2 champions: 2002–03
- Berks/Bucks & Oxon 1 champions: 2003–04, 2021–22
- Southern Counties North champions (2): 2006–07, 2013–14

2nd team:

- Berks/Bucks & Oxon 1 North champions: 2006–07
- Berks/Bucks & Oxon 2 North champions: 2010–11

== See also ==
- English rugby union system
