= Beaconsfield RFC =

English rugby union club, based in Beaconsfield, Buckinghamshire

Beaconsfield Rugby Club
- Full name: Beaconfield Rugby Football Club
- Union: Buckinghamshire RFU
- Nickname: The B's/Field
- Founded: 1952; 74 years ago
- Location: Beaconsfield, Buckinghamshire, England
- Ground: Oak Lodge Meadow
- Chairman: (England) Laurence Sargent
- President: (England) Mike Wood
- Coach: (England) Tom French
- Captain: (England) Sean Morgan
- League: Regional 2 Thames
- 2024–25: 4th
Team kit

Official website
- www.beaconsfieldrfc.co.uk//

Beaconsfield Rugby Football Club, from Beaconsfield, England, was founded in 1952 by Jack Hickman, a rugby enthusiast and a leading light at Ealing RFC. Because of the distance he had to travel to support Ealing, he decided to form a new local club and an advert was placed in the Bucks Free Press, along with local contacts. Eventually the first match was played on 1953-10-03 against Windsor Ex 'A'. Beaconsfield have always played on the pitches at Oak Lodge Meadow, but sometimes used the local Army Camp pitch. Before the first clubhouse was obtained, the sides changed at the Army Camp, had tea in the Puffins Tea Shop in the old town and adjourned to The White Horse to entertain the opposition. In 1958, small Burnham Hall was obtained to become the clubhouse. The present clubhouse was completed in 1971.

The club regularly field three senior sides, and its mini & youth rugby provides the opportunity for some 700+ players to enjoy the game from under-5s all the way through to colts. Beaconsfield is one of the founding clubs of mini rugby and is home to one of the largest mini's amateur rugby teams in the country.

During the 2018–19 season Beaconsfield RFC set up girl's rugby teams for under-13s, under-15s, and under-18s and are known as the Beaconsfield Bobcats.

== Honours ==
1st team:

- Southern Counties North champions (2): 2011–12, 2017–18
- Counties 1 Southern North champions: 2023–24

2nd team:

- Berks/Bucks & Oxon 1 North champions: 2010–11
