= High Wycombe RFC =

English rugby union club

High Wycombe
- Full name: High Wycombe Rugby Football Club
- Union: Buckinghamshire Rugby Football Union
- Founded: 1929; 97 years ago
- Location: High Wycombe, Buckinghamshire, England
- Ground: Kingsmead Road
- League: Counties 1 Southern North
- 2024–25: 7th

Official website
- highwycomberfc.rfu.club

High Wycombe Rugby Football Club is a rugby union club located in High Wycombe, Buckinghamshire. The first XV currently play in Counties 1 Southern North and the club also operates a second team, third team, a vets side, a colts side and a women's team along with junior sides.

== History ==
The club was formed in January 1929 when the present Club was founded as the Old Wycombiensians by a group of old boys from The Royal Grammar School, High Wycombe. The club's youth section was formed in 1973.

When the league system was established in 1987, High Wycombe was placed in South West Division One, then the fifth tier of league rugby. After finishing as runners-up in the first two seasons of league rugby, the club won promotion to Courage Clubs 4 South for the 1991/92 season. The 1993 restructure saw the club placed in Courage League Division 5 South and played in that division throughout its three-season existence. However, when they were placed back in National 4 South, they were immediately relegated and were relegated again the following season. Since then they have moved between South West 1 East and Southern Counties North, having been promoted and relegated three times.

== Honours ==
- South West Division One champions: 1990–91
- Southern Counties North champions (3): 2002–03, 2004–05, 2014–15
