= Rams RFC =

English rugby union club, based in Berkshire

(England) Rams
- Full name: Rams Rugby Football Club
- Union: Berkshire RFU
- Nickname(s): Ensians, Rams
- Founded: 1924; 102 years ago
- Ground: Old Bath Road (Capacity: 2,000 (300 seats))
- Chairman: Andrew Lynch
- CEO: Gary Reynolds
- President: Marcus Noye
- Coach: Seb Reynolds
- League: National League 1
- 2025–26: 7th
Team kit

Official website
- www.ramsrugby.com

Rams Rugby Football Club is an English rugby union club based near the village of Sonning on the outskirts of Reading in the county of Berkshire. The first XV play in the third-level league of the English rugby union system, National League 1, following their promotion from National League 2 South as champions at the end of the 2018–19 season. Until 2018, the club had been known as Redingensians and then Redingensians Rams before being renamed simply as Rams for the 2018–19 season onwards.

== History ==
Rams consist of five senior teams of differing playing ability and a full complement of mini and junior sides. The first team currently plays in National League 1 (level 3) of the rugby union league structure. The second team play in Canterbury Division 3, the third team play in Berks/Bucks & Oxon Prem A, and the fourths in Berks/Bucks & Oxon 1. The fifth team participates in the Thames Valley Invitational Leagues. Both the under-17s and colts play in division 1 of their respective Berks/Bucks & Oxon leagues. Rams RFC is also renowned for its Rugby 7s capability and participates in several major international tournaments across Europe from March through to August.

== Ground ==
Rams play home fixtures at Old Bath Road in the village of Sonning on the north-east outskirts of Reading. As it is next to the A4 travel links are good, with parking available at the ground and regular bus services to Reading which is accessible by train. The ground consists of a main pitch next to a modern club-house, along with a number of other pitches for second XV and junior rugby.

Originally all standing, in 2021 the 300 seat Pountney Stand was built, named after the club's founding father Leslie Pountney. The ground capacity is around 2,000, with the 300 seater stand and approximately 1,700 (all standing) around the main pitch and on the club-house balcony.

On 6 December 2024 a record crowd of 1,829 attended Old Bath Road for the top of the table clash between Rams and Richmond.

== Honours ==
1st team:

- Southern Counties champions: 1987–88
- Southern Counties South champions: 2000–01
- Southern Counties North champions: 2005–06
- South West Division 2 East champions: 2006–07
- National League 3 South West champions: 2014–15
- National League 2 South champions: 2018–19

2nd team:

- Berks/Bucks & Oxon Premier A champions: 2007–08

4th team:

- Berks/Bucks & Oxon 4 South champions: 2014–15
- Berks/Bucks & Oxon 3 champions: 2015–16

== Current standings ==
2026–27 National League 1 table
Pos	Team	Pld	W	D	L	PF	PA	PD	TB	LB	Pts	Qualification
1	Plymouth Albion	5	5	0	0	292	57	+235	5	0	25	Promotion place
2	Tonbridge Juddians	5	5	0	0	216	203	+13	5	0	25	Promotion play-off
3	Sale FC	5	4	0	1	231	141	+90	4	1	21	Promotion play-off
4	Camborne	5	4	0	1	163	144	+19	4	0	20	
5	Bishop's Stortford	5	3	0	2	184	170	+14	4	0	16	
6	Birmingham Moseley	5	3	0	2	148	191	−43	4	0	16	
7	Leeds Tykes	5	2	0	3	179	121	+58	3	3	14	
8	Rosslyn Park	5	2	0	3	178	193	−15	4	1	13	
9	Dings Crusaders	5	1	1	3	203	199	+4	5	2	13	
10	Bury St Edmunds	5	2	0	3	158	218	−60	4	0	12	
11	Rams	5	1	1	3	129	177	−48	4	1	11	Relegation play-off
12	Sheffield	5	1	0	4	98	156	−58	3	2	9	Relegation place
13	London Scottish	5	1	0	4	141	211	−70	3	1	8	Relegation place
14	Cambridge	5	0	0	5	149	288	−139	4	3	7	Relegation place

Updated to match(es) played on 5 June 2026. Source: National League Rugby
Rules for classification: If teams are level at any stage, tiebreakers are applied in the following order:
1. Number of matches won
2. Number of matches drawn
3. Difference between points for and against
4. Total number of points for
5. Aggregate number of points scored in matches between tied teams
6. Number of matches won excluding the first match, then the second and so on until the tie is settled
