= Marlow RUFC =

English rugby union club, based in Marlow, Buckinghamshire

Coordinates: 51°34′10.00″N 0°45′19″W

Marlow Rugby Union Football Club
- Union: Buckinghamshire RFU
- Founded: 1947; 79 years ago
- Location: Marlow, Buckinghamshire, England
- Ground: Riverwoods Drive
- Chairman: (England) Derek Harris
- President: (Scotland) Paul Sharp
- Coach(es): (England) George Jafari
- Captain: (England) Sam Tuckerman
- League: Regional 2 Thames
- 2025-26: 6th
1st kit	2nd kit

Official website
- marlowrugby.co.uk

Marlow Rugby Union Football Club is an English rugby union club formed in 1947. Marlow Rugby Club play at Riverwoods Drive in Marlow, Buckinghamshire. It currently has 3 senior men’s sides, ladies, colts, youth (most age groups run two sides) and mini-section. Marlow is the birthplace of mini rugby in England, and runs one of the oldest mini tournaments, now in its 44th year.

== International players ==
- (Scotland) Paul Burnell
- (Scotland) Derek White
- (England) Matt Dawson
- (England) Nick Kennedy
- (England) Chris Sheasby
- (Croatia) Jaska Lovreta
- (Croatia) Michael Lunjevich
- (Czech Republic) Ladia Vondrasek
- (Germany) John Dawe
- (Tonga) Feao Vunipola
- (England) Henry Taylor (U18/20)
- (Poland) Stash Maltby
- (Scotland) Charlie Moss (U18/20)
- (Norway) William Cadden
- (Australia) Lotu Vunipola (U20)
- (England) Finn Keylock (U20)

== Honours ==
- Southern Counties champions: 1989–90
- South West 2 East champions: 2001–02
- Southern Counties (north v south) promotion play-off winner: 2008–09
- Southern Counties North champions: 2016–17

== Head coaches ==
- John Brodley (England)
- Chris Sheasby (England)
- Fe’ao Vunipola (Tonga)
- Rory Greenslade-Jones (Wales)
- Kevin O'Byrne (Ireland)
- George Jafari (England)
