= Holme Park =

Sports ground in Sonning, Berkshire, England

- Interactive map of Holme Park
- Location: Sonning, England
- Coordinates: 51°28′0″N 0°55′5″W
- Surface: Grass

Construction
- Opened: 1939

Tenant
- Reading RFC

Holme Park is a sports ground in Sonning (occasionally called Sonning-on-Thames), a village and civil parish in the English county of Berkshire, a few miles east of Reading. It is used for rugby union matches and is the home of Reading Rugby Football Club.

Reading RFC had a nomadic existence until, shortly before the Second World War, the land at Holme Park was purchased and the pitches laid. After the war a new clubhouse and stand were erected, the stand later being moved to its present position on the far side of the ground. The current clubhouse was built through the efforts of Gordon Richens in 1968 and was expanded, with squash courts added, by Colin Barrett in 1975.

The club had been struggling with income over expenditure since the mid-1990s and with debts and loans spiralling the club found it increasing difficult to service the arrears. An attempted buy-out of the club and assets by former coach Phil Hall was quashed at the club's annual general meeting in 2007. Alastair McHarg, capped 44 times by Scotland, was a vociferous opponent of the Hall buy-out. He said "The good thing about the Phil Hall deal is that at least it has shaken up some people to get their act together."
