= Weston Turville =

Village in Buckinghamshire, England

Coordinates: 51.7916°N 0.7577°W

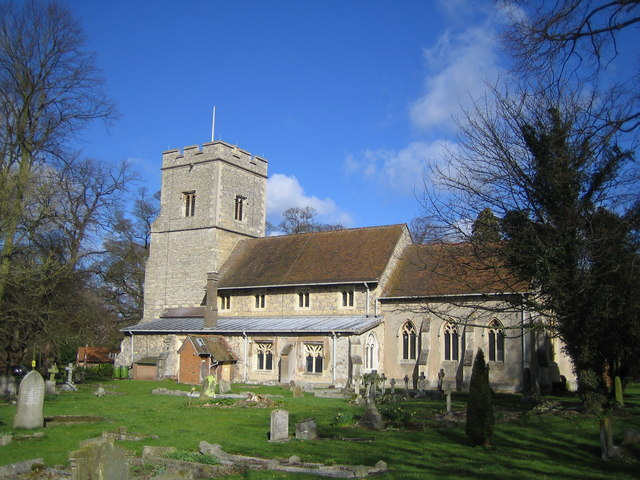
- Church of St Mary the Virgin

- Location within Buckinghamshire
- Population: 3,127 (2011 Census)
- OS grid reference: SP855109
- Civil parish: Weston Turville
- Unitary authority: Buckinghamshire
- Ceremonial county: Buckinghamshire
- Region: South East
- Country: England
- Sovereign state: United Kingdom
- Post town: AYLESBURY
- Postcode district: HP22
- Dialling code: 01296
- Police: Thames Valley
- Fire: Buckinghamshire
- Ambulance: South Central
- UK Parliament: Aylesbury
- Website: Weston Turville Parish Council

Weston Turville is a historic village and civil parish in the Vale of Aylesbury in Buckinghamshire, England. The village is at the foot of the Chiltern Hills, 3 miles (4.9 km) from the market town of Wendover and 3.5 miles (5.7 km) from Aylesbury. In 2011 the parish had a population of 3127.

The village name 'Weston' is Anglo Saxon in origin, and means 'western estate' or western homestead, as 'tun' means an enclosed farm in Angle. In the Domesday Book of 1086, the village is recorded as Westone. The suffix 'Turville' was added later, referring to the lords of the manor in the 13th century, and to differentiate the village from other places called Weston. Between 1236 and 1539, Weston Turville grew to have five areas, or ends – Church End, Brook End, South End, West End and World's End. These five ends still exist, as documented by Hamish Eaton's book "Weston Turville – A History", published in 1997.

The 13th-century church of St. Mary the Virgin is the parish church for Weston Turville and is a grade I listed building. A church has existed on the land at the end of Church Walk since the 12th century; however, all that remains of the original church is the font and an octagonal shaft built into the south wall of the chancel.

The nearest railway station is 1.8 miles (2.9 km) away in the village of Stoke Mandeville on the London to Aylesbury Line, operated by Chiltern Railways. Weekday buses serving Weston Turville run between Aylesbury and RAF Halton, and are operated by Arriva and Redline. Additionally, a service connects to both Aylesbury and Leighton Buzzard on Sundays.

Weston Turville has a small bird reserve, which was established by BBONT (Bucks, Beds and Oxford Nature Trust), now BBOWT (Berks, Bucks & Oxon Wildlife Trust). The site had one hide and can be accessed from the main reservoir footpath.

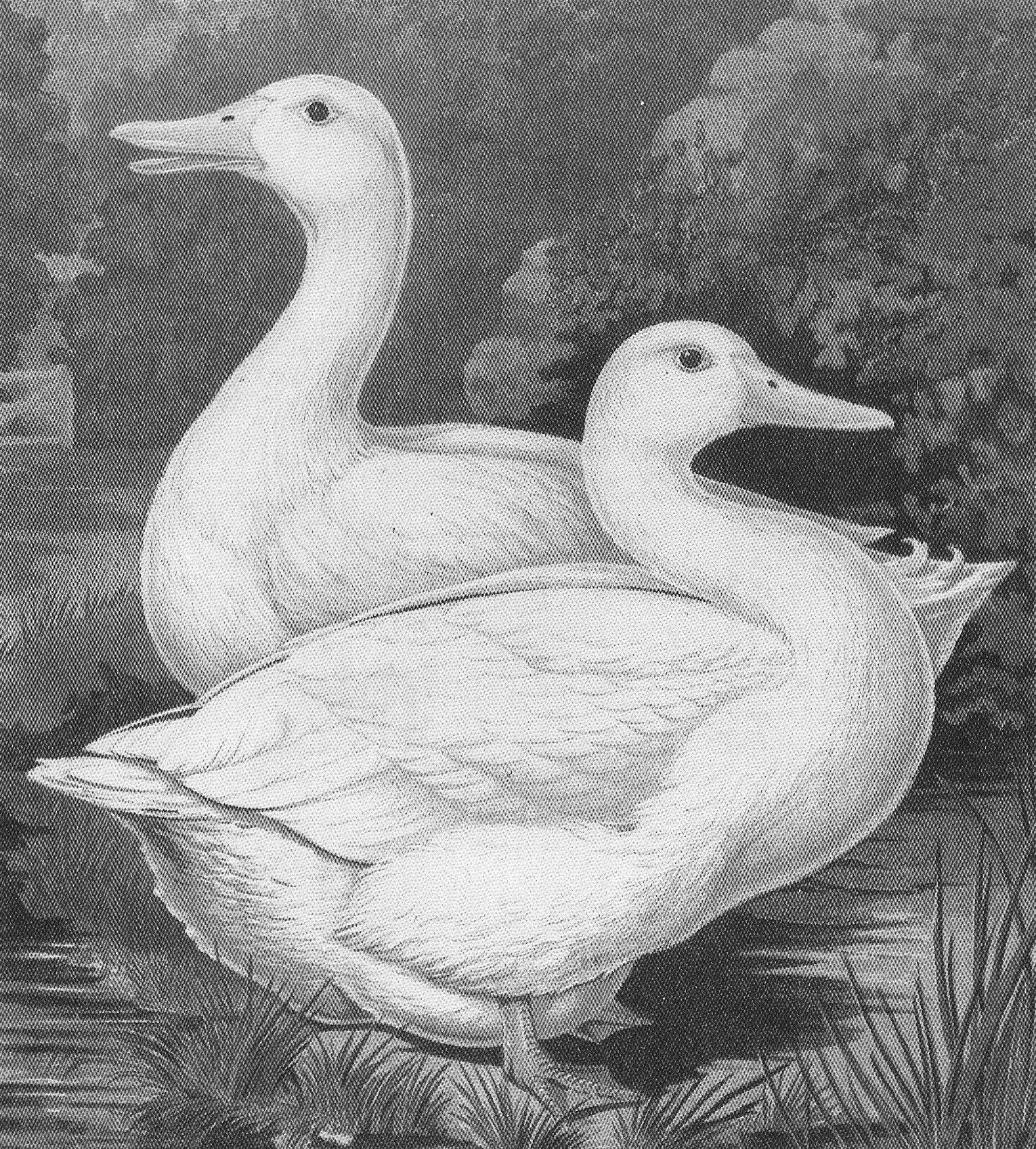
Prize-winning Aylesbury duck (front) and drake (rear), 1873

Weston Turville was at one time, one of the main places where Aylesbury ducks were bred. In the 18th century selective breeding of white common ducks led to a white domestic duck, generally known as the English White. Since at least the 1690s ducks had been farmed in Aylesbury, and Weston Turville went on to become one of the main areas where these ducks were bred. They were bred and brought up by poor people, and sent to London by the weekly carriers.

A notable resident of the village in the 16th century was Dr John Colet. It is after him that the John Colet School in nearby Wendover is named. At one time, the UK TV presenter and Radio DJ Noel Edmonds had a home in Weston Turville. Currently former Arsenal defender Nigel Winterburn and Richard Lapthorne, Chairman of Cable & Wireless Communications, live in the village.

Other notable features include:

- The hamlet of Bye Green is located to the north of the village, on the Brook End (road) leading to Aston Clinton.
- Weston Turville Golf Club was established in 1973. The 18-hole golf course is situated at the foot of the Chiltern Hills and off the white tees measures 6,008 yards and a par 69 and for the red ladies tees measures 5,369 yards and is a par 70.
- There are many historic buildings with listed status in Weston Turville and much of the village was designated a conservation area in 1991.
- Weston Turville Church of England School is a mixed voluntary aided primary school, which takes children from the age of four through to the age of eleven. The school has approximately 210 pupils.
- Weston Turville Reservoir built in 1797.
- The Manor House, site of a motte and twin baileys, the remains of the scheduled monument Weston Turville Castle.
- A local weather station with climatological history of the village.
- Weston Turville has a well-known audio library, Calibre Audio Library, which opened in 1974. It is located next to the Holiday Inn Hotel.
