= Counties 2 Berks/Bucks & Oxon =

Division of the English rugby union system

- Current season or competition: 2024-25 Counties 2 Berks/Bucks & Oxon North/South
- Sport: Rugby union
- Instituted: 1987; 39 years ago (as Bucks/Oxon 1)
- Country: England
- Most titles: Amersham & Chiltern, Bicester, Chipping Norton, Gosford All Blacks, Newbury Stags, Slough (2 titles)
- Website: englandrugby.com

Counties 2 Berks/Bucks & Oxon (West) / (East) (formerly Berks, Bucks & Oxon Premier) is a division at level 8 of the English rugby union system featuring teams principally from Berkshire, Buckinghamshire and Oxfordshire. Promoted teams usually move up to Counties 1 Southern North while relegated teams drop to Counties 3 Berks/Bucks & Oxon (North) or Counties 3 Berks/Bucks & Oxon (South) depending on location.

When the league was introduced in 1987 it was known as Bucks/Oxon 1 and was set up originally for teams from Buckinghamshire and Oxfordshire. It was expanded to include teams from Berkshire (who had been playing teams from Dorset and Wiltshire) from the 2000–01 season onwards.

== Teams 2026–27 ==
=== West ===
Departing were champions Banbury II promoted to Counties 1 Southern North while Faringdon (9th) and Newbury II (10th) were relegated.

Team	Ground	Capacity	Town/Village	Previous season
Abingdon	Southern Sports Park		Abingdon, Oxfordshire	7th
Chipping Norton	Greystones		Chipping Norton, Oxfordshire	3rd
Didcot	Boundary Park		Didcot, Oxfordshire	2nd
Gosford All Blacks	Stratfield Brake		Kidlington, Oxfordshire	Relegated from Counties 1 Southern North
Grove	Cane Lane		Grove, Oxfordshire	4th
Hungerford	Triangle Field		Hungerford, Berkshire	6th
Reading II	Holme Park		Sonning, Reading, Berkshire	Level transfer from South (7th)
Stow-on-the-Wold II	Oddington Road		Stow-on-the-Wold, Gloucestershire	Promoted from Counties 3 Berks/Bucks & Oxon (North)
Tadley Tigers	Red Lane		Aldermaston, Berkshire	5th
Wallingford	Wallingford Sports Park		Wallingford, Oxfordshire	Relegated from Counties 1 Southern North
Witney II	Hailey Road		Witney, Oxfordshire	8th

Locations of the 2026–27 Counties 2 Berks/Bucks & Oxon West teams in Oxfordshire
Locations of the 2026–27 Counties 2 Berks/Bucks & Oxon West teams in Berkshire

=== East ===
Departing were Beaconsfield II , promoted to Counties 1 Southern North while Bracknell III were relegated to Counties 3 Berks/Bucks & Oxon (South).

Also leaving on a level transfer to the West division were Reading II (7th).

Team	Ground	Capacity	Town/Village	Previous season
Amersham & Chiltern II	Weedon Lane		Amersham, Buckinghamshire	3rd
Bletchley	Manor Fields		Bletchley, Milton Keynes, Buckinghamshire	Relegated from Counties 1 Southern North
Chesham	Chiltern Hills Academy		Chesham, Buckinghamshire	6th
Chinnor IV	Kingsey Road	2,000	Thame, Oxfordshire	Promoted from Counties 3 BBO (North)
High Wycombe II	Kingsmead Road		High Wycombe, Buckinghamshire	Promoted from Counties 3 BBO (South)
Maidenhead II	Braywick Park		Maidenhead, Berkshire	4th
Marlow II	Riverwoods Drive		Marlow, Buckinghamshire	8th
Milton Keynes	Emerson Valley		Shenley Brook End, Milton Keynes, Buckinghamshire	2nd
Risborough	Princes Risborough School		Princes Risborough, Buckinghamshire	9th
Slough	Tamblyn Fields		Slough, Berkshire	5th
Windsor II	Home Park		Windsor, Berkshire	Promoted from Counties 3 BBO (South)

Locations of the 2026–27 Counties 2 Berks/Bucks & Oxon East teams in Buckinghamshire & Oxfordshire
Locations of the 2026–27 Counties 2 Berks/Bucks & Oxon East teams in Berkshire

== Teams 2025–26 ==
For the new season the North and South divisions were rebranded West and East respectively.

=== West ===
Departing were Oxford and Gosford All Blacks both promoted to Counties 1 Southern North as champions and runners up respectively. Also departing were Milton Keynes (3rd) and Chesham (9th) on a level transfer to the East division.

Tring II (5th) moved on a level transfer to the newly titled Counties 2 Hertfordshire.

Wheatley (8th in 2024-25) started but did not complete the season leaving ten clubs to contest the outstanding fixtures.

Team	Ground	Capacity	Town/Village	Previous season
Abingdon	Southern Sports Park		Abingdon, Oxfordshire	10th
Banbury II	Bodicote Park		Banbury, Oxfordshire	Promoted from Counties 3 Berks/Bucks & Oxon (North) (Champions)
Chipping Norton	Greystones		Chipping Norton, Oxfordshire	7th
Didcot	Boundary Park		Didcot, Oxfordshire	6th
Faringdon	Folly Sports Park		Faringdon, Oxfordshire	11th
Grove	Cane Lane		Grove, Oxfordshire	Relegated from Counties 1 Southern North (12th)
Hungerford	Triangle Field		Hungerford, Berkshire	Level transfer from South division
Newbury II	Monks Lane		Newbury, Berkshire	Level transfer from South division
Tadley Tigers	Red Lane		Aldermaston, Berkshire	Level transfer from South division
Witney II	Hailey Road		Witney, Oxfordshire	4th

Locations of the 2025-26 Counties 2 Berks/Bucks & Oxon West teams in Oxfordshire
Locations of the 2025-26 Counties 2 Berks/Bucks & Oxon West teams in Berkshire

=== East ===
Departing were Henley II, promoted to Counties 1 Southern North while Thatcham were relegated to Counties 3 Berks/Bucks & Oxon (South).

Also leaving on a level transfer to the West division were Hungerford (9th), Newbury II (10th) and Tadley Tigers (6th).

Rams III (runners-up) did not return for the new season.

Henley III ( Promoted from Counties 3 Berks/Bucks & Oxon (South) (champions) in 2024-25) started but did not complete the season leaving ten clubs to contest the outstanding fixtures.

Team	Ground	Capacity	Town/Village	Previous season
Amersham & Chiltern II	Weedon Lane		Amersham, Buckinghamshire	7th
Beaconsfield II	Oak Lodge Meadow		Beaconsfield, Buckinghamshire	4th
Bracknell III	Lily Hill Park		Bracknell, Berkshire	Promoted from Counties 3 Berks/Bucks & Oxon (South) (runners-up)
Chesham	Chiltern Hills Academy		Chesham, Buckinghamshire	Level transfer from North division (9th)
Maidenhead II	Braywick Park		Maidenhead, Berkshire	5th
Marlow II	Riverwoods Drive		Marlow, Buckinghamshire	3rd
Milton Keynes	Emerson Valley		Shenley Brook End, Milton Keynes, Buckinghamshire	Level transfer from North division (3rd)
Reading II	Holme Park		Sonning, Reading, Berkshire	Promoted from Counties 3 Berks/Bucks & Oxon (South) (4th)
Risborough	Princes Risborough School		Princes Risborough, Buckinghamshire	Promoted from Counties 3 Berks/Bucks & Oxon (North)
Slough	Tamblyn Fields		Slough, Berkshire	8th

Locations of the 2025-26 Counties 2 Berks/Bucks & Oxon East teams in Buckinghamshire & Oxfordshire
Locations of the 2025-26 Counties 2 Berks/Bucks & Oxon East teams in Berkshire

== Teams 2024–25 ==
=== North ===
Departing were High Wycombe, promoted to Counties 1 Southern North. Banbury (11th) and Oxford Harlequins III (12th) were relegated.

Team	Ground	Capacity	Town/Village	Previous season
Abingdon	Southern Sports Park		Abingdon, Oxfordshire	10th
Chesham	Chiltern Hills Academy		Chesham, Buckinghamshire	8th
Chipping Norton	Greystones		Chipping Norton, Oxfordshire	5th
Didcot	Boundary Park		Didcot, Oxfordshire	6th
Faringdon	Folly Sports Park		Faringdon, Oxfordshire	Promoted from Counties 3 Berks/Bucks & Oxon North
Gosford All Blacks	Stratfield Brake		Kidlington, Oxfordshire	3rd
Milton Keynes	Emerson Valley		Shenley Brook End, Milton Keynes, Buckinghamshire	Relegated from Counties 1 Southern North (12th)
Oxford	North Hinksey Park		North Hinksey, Oxford, Oxfordshire	2nd
Tring II	Pendley Sports Centre		Tring, Hertfordshire	7th
Wheatley	Holton Playing Fields		Holton, Wheatley, Oxfordshire	9th
Witney II	Hailey Road		Witney, Oxfordshire	4th

Locations of the 2024-25 Counties 2 Berks/Bucks & Oxon North teams in Oxfordshire
Locations of the 2024-25 Counties 2 Berks/Bucks & Oxon North teams in Buckinghamshire & Hertfordshire

=== South ===
Departing were Reading Abbey, promoted to Counties 1 Southern North.

Crowthorne (9th in 2023-24) started but did not complete the season leaving eleven sides to contest the remaining fixtures.

Team	Ground	Capacity	Town/Village	Previous season
Amersham & Chiltern II	Weedon Lane		Amersham, Buckinghamshire	Promoted from Counties 3 Berks/Bucks & Oxon (South) (Champions)
Beaconsfield II	Oak Lodge Meadow		Beaconsfield, Buckinghamshire	8th
Henley II	Dry Leas		Henley-on-Thames, Oxfordshire	2nd
Hungerford	Triangle Field		Hungerford, Berkshire	4th
Maidenhead II	Braywick Park		Maidenhead, Berkshire	New entry
Marlow II	Riverwoods Drive		Marlow, Buckinghamshire	Promoted from Counties 3 Berks/Bucks & Oxon (South) (3rd)
Newbury II	Monks Lane		Newbury, Berkshire	6th
Rams III	Old Bath Road		Sonning, Reading, Berkshire	Relegated from Counties 1 Southern North (11th)
Slough	Tamblyn Fields		Slough, Berkshire	5th
Tadley Tigers	Red Lane		Aldermaston, Berkshire	3rd
Thatcham	Henwicky Worthy Sports Field		Thatcham, Berkshire	7th

Locations of the 2024-25 Counties 2 Berks/Bucks & Oxon South teams in Buckinghamshire & Oxfordshire
Locations of the 2024-25 Counties 2 Berks/Bucks & Oxon South teams in Berkshire

== Teams 2023–24 ==
=== North ===
Departing were Oxford Harlequins II, promoted to Counties 1 Southern North. Faringdon (10th) together with Amersham & Chiltern II (11th) were relegated.

Team	Ground	Capacity	Town/Village	Previous season
Abingdon	Southern Sports Park		Abingdon, Oxfordshire	Level transfer from Counties 2 BBO (South) (3rd)
Banbury II	Bodicote Park		Banbury, Oxfordshire	6th
Chesham	Chiltern Hills Academy		Chesham, Buckinghamshire	9th
Chipping Norton	Greystones		Chipping Norton, Oxfordshire	3rd
Didcot	Boundary Park		Didcot, Oxfordshire	8th
Gosford All Blacks	Stratfield Brake		Kidlington, Oxfordshire	Relegated from Counties 1 Southern North (8th)
High Wycombe	Kingsmead Road		High Wycombe, Buckinghamshire	Relegated from Counties 1 Southern North (10th)
Oxford	North Hinksey Park		North Hinksey, Oxford, Oxfordshire	2nd
Oxford Harlequins III	Horspath Sports Ground		Horspath, Oxfordshire	Promoted from Counties 3 Berks/Bucks & Oxon North (Champions)
Tring II	Pendley Sports Centre		Tring, Hertfordshire	4th
Wheatley	Holton Playing Fields		Holton, Wheatley, Oxfordshire	5th
Witney II	Hailey Road		Witney, Oxfordshire	7th

Locations of the 2023-24 Counties 2 Berks/Bucks & Oxon North teams in Oxfordshire
Locations of the 2023-24 Counties 2 Berks/Bucks & Oxon North teams in Buckinghamshire & Hertfordshire

=== South ===
Departing were Rams III, promoted to Counties 1 Southern North. Abingdon (3rd) left on a level transfer to Counties 2 BBO (North).

Reading II (10th) and Aldermaston (11th) were relegated to Counties 3 Berks Bucks & Oxon South. Henley III (6th) also dropped to Counties 3 Berks Bucks & Oxon South to be replaced by Henley II who joined from Division 1 of the Halbro Raging Bull Shield league.

Maidenhead III (8th) did not return for the new season.

Team	Ground	Capacity	Town/Village	Previous season
Beaconsfield II	Oak Lodge Meadow		Beaconsfield, Buckinghamshire	7th
Crowthorne	The Crows New Nest		Crowthorne, Berkshire	Promoted from Counties 3 Berks/Bucks & Oxon South
Henley II	Dry Leas		Henley-on-Thames, Oxfordshire	New entry
Hungerford	Triangle Field		Hungerford, Berkshire	4th
Newbury II	Monks Lane		Newbury, Berkshire	9th
Reading Abbey	Rosehill		Reading, Berkshire	Relegated from Counties 1 Southern North (9th)
Slough	Tamblyn Fields		Slough, Berkshire	5th
Tadley Tigers	Red Lane		Aldermaston, Berkshire	2nd
Thatcham	Henwicky Worthy Sports Field		Thatcham, Berkshire	Relegated from Counties 1 Southern North (12th)

Locations of the 2023-24 Counties 2 Berks/Bucks & Oxon South teams in Buckinghamshire & Oxfordshire
Locations of the 2023-24 Counties 2 Berks/Bucks & Oxon South teams in Berkshire

== Teams 2022–23 ==
This was the first team following the RFU Adult Competition Review which saw the league split into North and South divisions.

Departing were Bletchley, were promoted to Counties 1 Southern North and Crowthorne who finished bottom and were relegated to Counties 3 Berks/Bucks & Oxon South.

=== North ===
Team	Ground	Capacity	Town/Village	Previous season
Amersham & Chiltern II	Weedon Lane		Amersham, Buckinghamshire	Promoted from Berks/Bucks & Oxon 1 (runners-up)
Banbury II	Bodicote Park		Banbury, Oxfordshire	Promoted from Berks/Bucks & Oxon 1 (3rd)
Chesham	Chiltern Hills Academy		Chesham, Buckinghamshire	8th
Chipping Norton	Greystones		Chipping Norton, Oxfordshire	4th
Didcot	Boundary Park		Didcot, Oxfordshire	2nd
Faringdon	Folly Sports Park		Faringdon, Oxfordshire	Promoted from Berks/Bucks & Oxon 2 (North) (Runners-up)
Oxford	North Hinksey Park		North Hinksey, Oxford, Oxfordshire	Promoted from Berks/Bucks & Oxon 2 (North) (Champions)
Oxford Harlequins II	Horspath Sports Ground		Horspath, Oxfordshire	Promoted from Berks/Bucks & Oxon 1 (5th)
Tring II	Pendley Sports Centre		Tring, Hertfordshire	New entry
Wheatley	Holton Playing Fields		Holton, Wheatley, Oxfordshire	9th
Witney II	Hailey Road		Witney, Oxfordshire	Promoted from Berks/Bucks & Oxon 1 (6th)

Locations of the 2022-23 Counties 2 Berks/Bucks & Oxon North teams in Oxfordshire
Locations of the 2022-23 Counties 2 Berks/Bucks & Oxon North teams in Buckinghamshire & Hertfordshire

=== South ===
Team	Ground	Capacity	Town/Village	Previous season
Abingdon	Southern Sports Park		Abingdon, Oxfordshire	7th
Aldermaston	Recreational Society		Aldermaston, Berkshire	6th
Beaconsfield II	Oak Lodge Meadow		Beaconsfield, Buckinghamshire	Promoted from Berks/Bucks & Oxon 1 (12th)
Henley III	Dry Leas		Henley-on-Thames, Oxfordshire	Promoted from Berks/Bucks & Oxon 2 (South) (Champions)
Hungerford	Triangle Field		Hungerford, Berkshire	10th
Maidenhead III	Braywick Park		Maidenhead, Berkshire	Promoted from Berks/Bucks & Oxon 2 (South) (runners-up)
Newbury II	Monks Lane		Newbury, Berkshire	Promoted from Berks/Bucks & Oxon 1 (8th)
Rams III	Old Bath Road		Sonning, Reading, Berkshire	Promoted from Berks/Bucks & Oxon 1 (4th)
Reading II	Holme Park		Sonning, Reading, Berkshire	Promoted from Berks/Bucks & Oxon 1 (7th)
Slough	Tamblyn Fields		Slough, Berkshire	5th
Tadley Tigers	Red Lane		Aldermaston, Berkshire	3rd

Locations of the 2022-23 Counties 2 Berks/Bucks & Oxon South teams in Buckinghamshire & Oxfordshire
Locations of the 2022-23 Counties 2 Berks/Bucks & Oxon South teams in Berkshire

== Teams 2021–22 ==
In February 2022 Drifters RFC withdrew from the league with their fixtures liquidated meaning it will be completed with eleven teams.

Team	Ground	Capacity	Town/Village	Previous season
Abingdon	Southern Sports Park		Abingdon, Oxfordshire	4th
Aldermaston	Recreational Society		Aldermaston, Berkshire	Promoted from Berks/Bucks & Oxon 2
Bletchley	Manor Fields		Bletchley, Buckinghamshire	7th
Chesham	Chiltern Hills Academy		Chesham, Buckinghamshire	Relegated from Southern Counties North (11th)
Chipping Norton	Greystones		Chipping Norton, Oxfordshire	3rd
Crowthorne	The Crows New Nest		Crowthorne, Berkshire	Promoted from Berks/Bucks & Oxon 2
Didcot	Boundary Park		Didcot, Oxfordshire	Relegated from Southern Counties North (12th)
Hungerford	Triangle Field		Hungerford, Berkshire	9th
Slough	Tamblyn Fields		Slough, Buckinghamshire	6th
Tadley Tigers	Red Lane		Aldermaston, Berkshire	8th
Wheatley	Holton Playing Field of Dreams		Holton, Wheatley, Oxfordshire	5th

Locations of the 2021–22 Berks/Bucks & Oxon Premier teams

== 2020–21 ==
Due to the COVID-19 pandemic, the 2020–21 season was cancelled.

== Teams 2019–20 ==
Team	Ground	Capacity	Town/Village	Previous season
Abingdon	Southern Sports Park		Abingdon, Oxfordshire	Promoted from BBO Championship (runners up)
Bletchley	Manor Fields		Bletchley, Buckinghamshire	10th
Chipping Norton	Greystones		Chipping Norton, Oxfordshire	Promoted from BBO Championship (champions)
Drifters	Farnham Common		Farnham Common, Buckinghamshire	8th
Gosford All Blacks	Stratfield Brake		Kidlington, Oxfordshire	5th
Hungerford	Triangle Field		Hungerford, Berkshire	9th
Littlemore (Note: Littlemore dropped out of the league in December 2019.)	Oxford Academy		Littlemore, Oxford, Oxfordshire	Relegated from Southern Counties North (12th)
Milton Keynes	Emerson Valley		Shenley Brook End, Milton Keynes, Buckinghamshire	3rd
Oxford	North Hinksey Park		North Hinksey, Oxford, Oxfordshire	6th
Slough	Tamblyn Fields		Slough, Buckinghamshire	Relegated from Southern Counties North (11th)
Tadley Tigers	Red Lane		Aldermaston, Berkshire	4th
Wheatley	Holton Playing Field of Dreams		Holton, Wheatley, Oxfordshire	7th

Locations of the 2019–20 Berks/Bucks & Oxon Premier teams in Oxfordshire
Locations of the 2019–20 Berks/Bucks & Oxon Premier teams in Berkshire
Locations of the 2019–20 Berks/Bucks & Oxon Premier teams in Buckinghamshire

== Teams 2018–19 ==
Team	Ground	Capacity	Town/Village	Previous season
Bletchley	Manor Fields		Bletchley, Milton Keynes, Buckinghamshire	8th
Chesham	Chiltern Hills Academy		Chesham, Buckinghamshire	3rd
Didcot	Edmunds Park		Didcot, Oxfordshire	6th
Drifters	Farnham Common		Farnham Common, Buckinghamshire	Relegated from Southern Counties North (12th)
Gosford All Blacks	Stratfield Brake		Kidlington, Oxfordshire	Relegated from Southern Counties North (11th)
Hungerford	Triangle Field		Hungerford, Berkshire	9th
Milton Keynes	Emerson Valley		Shenley Brook End, Milton Keynes, Buckinghamshire	7th
Oxford	North Hinksey Park		North Hinksey, Oxford, Oxfordshire	Promoted from BBO Championship (runners up)
Risborough	Princes Risborough School		Princes Risborough, Buckinghamshire	Promoted from BBO Championship (champions)
Tadley Tigers	Red Lane		Aldermaston, Berkshire	5th
Wheatley	Holton Playing Fields		Holton, Wheatley, Oxfordshire	4th

Locations of the 2018–19 Berks/Bucks & Oxon Premier teams in Oxfordshire
Locations of the 2018–19 Berks/Bucks & Oxon Premier teams in Berkshire
Locations of the 2018–19 Berks/Bucks & Oxon Premier teams in Buckinghamshire

== Teams 2017–18 ==
Team	Ground	Capacity	Town/Village	Previous season
Abingdon	Southern Sports Park		Abingdon, Oxfordshire	8th
Bletchley	Manor Fields		Bletchley, Milton Keynes, Buckinghamshire	Relegated from Southern Counties North (12th)
Chesham	Chiltern Hills Academy		Chesham, Buckinghamshire	4th
Didcot	Edmunds Park		Didcot, Oxfordshire	5th
Hungerford	Triangle Field		Hungerford, Berkshire	6th
Littlemore	Oxford Academy		Littlemore, Oxford, Oxfordshire	Promoted from Berks/Bucks & Oxon Championship (champions)
Milton Keynes	Emerson Valley		Shenley Brook End, Milton Keynes, Buckinghamshire	Relegated from Southern Counties North (11th)
Slough	Tamblyn Fields		Slough, Berkshire	3rd
Tadley Tigers	Red Lane		Aldermaston, Berkshire	9th
Wheatley	Holton Playing Fields		Holton, Wheatley, Oxfordshire	Promoted from Berks/Bucks & Oxon Championship (runners up)

Locations of the 2017–18 Berks/Bucks & Oxon Premier teams in Oxfordshire
Locations of the 2017–18 Berks/Bucks & Oxon Premier teams in Berkshire
Locations of the 2017–18 Berks/Bucks & Oxon Premier teams in Buckinghamshire

== Teams 2016–17 ==
- Abingdon
- Alcester
- Chesham
- Crowthorne
- Didcot (promoted from Berks/Bucks & Oxon Championship)
- Drifters (relegated from Southern Counties North)
- Hungerford
- Phoenix (promoted from Berks/Bucks & Oxon Championship)
- Risborough
- Slough
- Swindon College Old Boys (relegated from Southern Counties North)
- Tadley

== 2015–16 ==
The 2015–16 Berks/Bucks & Oxon Premier consisted of twelve teams; five from Oxfordshire, four from Berkshire and three from Buckinghamshire. The season started on 12 September 2015 and the last league matches were played on 23 April 2016.

=== Participating teams and location ===
Seven of the twelve teams participated in last season's competition. The 2014–15 champions Reading Abbey were promoted to the Southern Counties North along with runner-up, Swindon College Old Boys, while Phoenix were relegated to the Berks/Bucks & Oxon Championship.

Locations of the 2015–16 Berks/Bucks & Oxon Premier teams in Oxfordshire
Locations of the 2015–16 Berks/Bucks & Oxon Premier teams in Berkshire
Locations of the 2015–16 Berks/Bucks & Oxon Premier teams in Buckinghamshire

Team	Ground	Capacity	Town/Village	Previous season
Abingdon	Southern Sports Park		Abingdon, Oxfordshire	4th
Alchester	Fritwell Playing Fields		Fritwell, Oxfordshire	relegated from Southern Counties North (11th)
Chesham	Chiltern Hills Academy Playing Fields		Chesham, Buckinghamshire	8th
Chipping Norton	Greystones		Chipping Norton, Oxfordshire	6th
Crowthorne	The Crows New Nest		Reading, Berkshire	promoted from Berks/Bucks & Oxon Championship (runner-up)
Driftera	One Pin Lane	As many as you like.	Farnham Common, Buckinghamshire	relegated from Southern Counties North
Gosford All Blacks	Stratfield Brake		Kidlington, Oxfordshire	3rd
Hungerford	Triangle Field		Hungerford, Berkshire	5th
Milton Keynes	Emerson Valley		Milton Keynes, Buckinghamshire	Relegated from Southern Counties North (12th)
Risborough	Princes Risborough School Playing Fields		Princes Risborough, Buckinghamshire	promoted from Berks/Bucks & Oxon Championship (champions)
Slough	Tamblyn Fields		Slough, Berkshire	9th
Tadley Tigers	Red Lane		Aldermaston, Berkshire	relegated from London 2 South West (12th) & level transferred to league
Wheatley	Holton Playing Fields		Holton, Wheatley, Oxfordshire	7th

== 2014–15 ==
=== Participating teams ===
- Abingdon (promoted from Berks/Bucks & Oxon Championship)
- Aylesbury Athletic
- Chesham
- Chipping Norton
- Gosford All Blacks
- Littlemore
- Phoenix
- Reading Abbey (relegated from Southern Counties North)
- Slough
- Swindon College Old Boys (relegated from Southern Counties North)
- Wheatley (promoted from Berks/Bucks & Oxon Championship)

== 2013–14 ==
=== Participating teams ===
- Aylesbury Athletic
- Bicester
- Chesham (promoted from Berks/Bucks & Oxon Championship)
- Chipping Norton
- Farnham Royal (promoted from Berks/Bucks & Oxon Championship)
- Gosford All Blacks
- Hungerford
- Littlemore
- Phoenix
- Slough (relegated from Southern Counties North)
- Tadley (relegated from Southern Counties North)

== 2012–13 ==
=== Participating teams ===
- Aylesbury Athletic
- Bicester
- Chipping Norton
- Gosford All Blacks
- Harwell
- Hungerford
- Littlemore
- Phoenix
- Risborough
- Stow-on-the-Wold
- Swindon College Old Boys

== 2011–12 ==
=== Participating teams ===
- Bicester
- Chipping Norton
- Drifters
- Gosford All Blacks
- Hungerford
- Littlemore
- Phoenix
- Stow-on-the-Wold and District
- Swindon College Old Boys
- Thatcham

== Original teams ==
When league rugby began in 1987 this division (known as Bucks/Oxon 1) contained the following teams from Buckinghamshire and Oxfordshire:

- Abingdon
- Beaconsfield
- Bicester
- Buckingham
- Chiltern (Note: Chiltern were renamed as Amersham & Chiltern in 1992.)
- Chinnor
- Didcot
- Grove
- Littlemore
- Pennanians (Note: Pennanians were renamed as Farnham Royal RFC in 2005.)
- Slough
- Witney

== Berks/Bucks & Oxon Premier honours ==
=== Bucks/Oxon 1 (1987–1993) ===
Originally known as Bucks/Oxon 1, it was a level 8 league for clubs based in Buckinghamshire and Oxfordshire. (Note: Berkshire based clubs would not join the division until 2000, having originally been involved in the Berks/Dorset/Wilts leagues.) Promotion was to Southern Counties and relegation to Bucks/Oxon 2.

Bucks/Oxon 1
Season	No of teams	Champions	Runners–up	Relegated team(s)	Ref
1987–88	12	Slough	Bicester	Didcot, Abingdon	
1988–89	11	Chiltern	Littlemore	Buckingham, Witney	
1989–90	11	Grove	Littlemore	Cholsey, Bicester	
1990–91	11	Olney	Oxford Marathon	Didcot, Drifters, Littlemore	
1991–92	11	Bicester	Slough	No relegation (Note: Due to restructuring of the majority of south west leagues increasing from 11 to 13 teams for the following season, there was no relegation.)	
1992–93	13	Oxford Marathon (Note: Despite winning the league, champions Oxford Marathon would not be promoted.)	Chiltern	Wheatley, Buckingham	
Green backgrounds are promotion places.

=== Bucks/Oxon 1 (1993–1996) ===
The creation of National League 5 South for the 1993–94 season meant that Bucks/Oxon 1 dropped to become a tier 9 league. Promotion continued to Southern Counties and relegation to Bucks/Oxon 2.

Bucks/Oxon 1
Season	No of teams	Champions	Runners–up	Relegated team(s)	Ref
1993–94	13	Amersham & Chiltern	Chinnor	Chipping Norton	
1994–95	13	Chinnor	Oxford Old Boys	Abingdon, Littlemore, Drifters	
1995–96	13	Oxford Old Boys (Note: Oxford Old Boys would merge with Oxford Marathon the following season to form Oxford Harlequins.)	Witney (Note: The cancellation of National League 5 South at the end of the 1995–96 season meant that seven clubs were promoted including Slough, Buckingham, Oxford Marathon, Grove and Milton Keynes.)	No relegation (Note: Restructuring caused by the cancellation of National League 5 South meant that there was no relegation.)	
Green backgrounds are promotion places.

=== Bucks/Oxon (1996–1997) ===
The cancellation of National League 5 South at the end of the 1995–96 season saw Bucks/Oxon 1 renamed as Bucks/Oxon and once more was a tier 8 league. Further restructuring meant that promotion was now to Southern Counties North (Note: Southern Counties was split into Southern Counties North and Southern Counties South as part of RFU restructuring at the end of the 1995–96 season.) and relegation was to Bucks/Oxon 2. (Note: Although Bucks/Oxon 2 was cancelled for the 1996–97 season it would return the following year, meaning that was still relegation from Bucks/Oxon.)

Bucks/Oxon
Season	No of teams	Champions	Runners–up	Relegated team(s)	Ref
1996–97	13	Chipping Norton	Beaconsfield	Didcot, Harwell, Gosford All Blacks, Abingdon	
Green backgrounds are promotion places.

=== Bucks/Oxon 1 (1997–1999) ===
Bucks/Oxon would revert to its former name of Bucks/Oxon 1 for the 1997–98 season, remaining a tier 8 league. Promotion continued to Southern Counties North and relegation to Bucks/Oxon 2

Bucks/Oxon 1
Season	No of teams	Champions	Runners–up	Relegated team(s)	Ref
1997–98	7	Cholsey	Pennanians	Grove, Wheatley	
1998–99	7	Witney	Drifters	No relegation (Note: No relegation as Bucks & Oxon would merge with Bucks & Oxon 2 to reform as a single division – Bucks & Oxon – for the following season.)	
Green backgrounds are promotion places.

=== Bucks/Oxon (1999–2000) ===
Once again Bucks/Oxon 1 became a single league known as Bucks/Oxon, remaining at tier 8. Promotion continued to Southern Counties North, while relegation would be to the new Berks/Bucks & Oxon 2. (Note: Berkshire based clubs would leave the Dorset & Wilts leagues at the end of the 1999–00 season to join the Bucks/Oxon leagues.)

Bucks/Oxon
Season	No of teams	Champions	Runners–up	Relegated team(s)	Ref
1999–00	11	Phoenix	Grove	Multiple teams (Note: The reintroduction of Bucks/Oxon 2 for the following season, meant that fives clubs were relegated, including Gosford All Blacks, Harwell, Abingdon, Didcot and Wheatley.)	
Green backgrounds are promotion places.

=== Berks/Bucks & Oxon 1 (2000–2004) ===
Restructuring ahead of the 2000–01 season would see Berkshire based clubs join the Bucks & Oxon leagues. (Note: Previously Berkshire clubs played in the Berks/Dorset/Wilts leagues.) This meant that Bucks/Oxon 1 would be renamed Berks/Bucks & Oxon 1, remaining a tier 8 league. Promotion would continue to Southern Counties North, while relegation was to Berks/Bucks & Oxon 2.

Berks/Bucks & Oxon 1
Season	No of teams	Champions	Runners–up	Relegated team(s)	Ref
2000–01	8	Oxford	Milton Keynes	Berkshire Shire Hall, Littlemore	
2001–02	10	Bicester	Wallingford	Wheatley, Chesham, Bletchley	
2002–03	10	Henley Wanderers	Phoenix	Pennanians, Littlemore, Drifters	
2003–04	9	Bletchley	Beaconsfield	No relegation (Note: No relegation as league would expand to 12 teams for the next season.)	
Green backgrounds are promotion places.

=== Berks/Bucks & Oxon (2004–2009) ===
Ahead of the 2004–05 season Berks/Bucks & Oxon 1 was renamed to Berks/Bucks & Oxon Premier, remaining a tier 8 league. Promotion continued to Southern Counties North and relegation was now to Berks/Bucks & Oxon 1 (formerly Berks/Bucks & Oxon 2).

Berks/Bucks & Oxon Premier
Season	No of teams	Champions	Runners–up	Relegated team(s)	Ref
2004–05	12	Swindon	Chipping Norton	Thatcham, Harwell	
2005–06	12	Newbury Stags	Milton Keynes	Farnham Royal, Chesham, Littlemore	
2006–07	11	Wallingford	Slough	Swindon College Old Boys	
2007–08	12	Chipping Norton	Bicester	Wheatley, Farnham Royal, Crowthorne	
2008–09	11	Newbury Stags	Amersham & Chiltern	No relegation	
Green backgrounds are promotion places.

=== Berks/Bucks & Oxon Premier (2009–present) ===
Despite widespread restructuring by the RFU at the end of the 2008–09 season, Berks/Bucks & Oxon Premier remained a tier 8 league, with promotion continuing to Southern Counties South and relegation to the newly introduced Berks/Bucks & Oxon Championship (last known as Berks/Bucks & Oxon 2 (Note: Berks/Bucks & Oxon 2 was cancelled at the end of the 2003–04 season.)).

Berks/Bucks & Oxon Premier
Season	No of teams	Champions	Runners–up	Relegated team(s)	Ref
2009–10	11	Crowthorne	Oxford	Abingdon, Harwell	
2010–11	10	Alchester	Slough	No relegation	
2011–12	11	Drifters	Thatcham	Phoenix	
2012–13	11	Stow-on-the-Wold	Swindon College Old Boys	Risborough, Harwell	
2013–14	11	Tadley	Bicester	Farnham Royal, Aylesbury Athletic	
2014–15	10	Reading Abbey	Swindon College Old Boys	Phoenix	
2015–16	12	Gosford All Blacks	Milton Keynes	Chipping Norton, Wheatley	
2016–17	11	Swindon College Old Boys	Drifters	Phoenix, Risborough	
2017–18	10	Slough	Littlemore	Abingdon	
2018–19	11	Chesham	Didcot	Risborough	
2019–20	11 (Note: League reduced from 12 to 11 teams by December 2019 when Littlemore dropped out of the league.)	Gosford All Blacks	Milton Keynes	Oxford	
2020–21	11				
Green backgrounds are promotion places.

== Number of league titles ==
- Amersham & Chiltern (2) (Note: Both of Amersham & Chiltern's titles were won back when the league was known as Bucks/Oxon 1, and one of the titles when the club was Chiltern RFC.)
- Bicester (2) (Note: One of Bicester's titles was won back when the league was known as Bucks/Oxon 1.)
- Chipping Norton (2) (Note: One of Chipping Norton's titles was won back when the league was known as Bucks/Oxon.)
- Gosford All Blacks (2)
- Newbury Stags (2)
- Slough (2) (Note: One of Slough's titles was won back when the league was known as Bucks/Oxon 1.)
- Alchester (1)
- Bletchley (1)
- Chesham (1)
- Chinnor (1) (Note: Chinnor's title was won back when the league was known as Bucks/Oxon 1.)
- Cholsey (1) (Note: Cholsey's title was won back when the league was known as Bucks/Oxon 1.)
- Crowthorne (1)
- Drifters (1)
- Grove (1) (Note: Grove's title was won back when the league was known as Bucks/Oxon 1.)
- Henley Wanderers (1)
- Olney (1) (Note: Olney's title was won back when the league was known as Bucks/Oxon 1.)
- Oxford (1) (Note: Oxford's title was won back when the league was known as Bucks/Oxon 1.)
- Oxford Marathon (1) (Note: Oxford Marathon merged with Oxford Old Boys in 1996 to form Oxford Harlequins.)
- Oxford Old Boys (1) (Note: Oxford Old Boys merged with Oxford Marathon in 1996 to form Oxford Harlequins.)
- Phoenix (1) (Note: Phoenix's title was won back when the league was known as Bucks/Oxon.)
- Reading Abbey (1)
- Stow-on-the-Wold (1)
- Swindon (1)
- Swindon College Old Boys (1)
- Tadley (1)
- Wallingford (1)
- Witney (1) (Note: Witney's title was won back when the league was known as Bucks/Oxon 1.)

== See also ==
- South West Division RFU
- Berkshire RFU
- Buckinghamshire RFU
- Oxfordshire RFU
- English rugby union system
- Rugby union in England
