= Berks/Bucks & Oxon 4 =

English rugby union league

- Current season or competition: 2016–17 Berks/Bucks & Oxon 4 (North & South)
- Sport: Rugby union
- Instituted: 2011; 15 years ago
- Number of teams: 17; 7 (North); 10 (South)
- Country: England
- Holders: Banbury III (North - 1st title); Reading Abbey IV (South - 1st title) (2016–17) (both promoted to Berks/Bucks & Oxon 3)

Berks, Bucks and Oxon Division 4 is an English rugby union league featuring teams from Berkshire, Buckinghamshire and Oxfordshire which is currently divided into two regional divisions - Berks/Bucks & Oxon 4 North and Berks/Bucks & Oxon 4 South. As with all of the divisions in this area at this level, the entire league is made up of second, third and fourth teams of clubs whose first teams play at a higher level of the rugby union pyramid. Promoted teams move up to Berks/Bucks & Oxon 3 and since the disbanding of the short-lived Berks/Bucks & Oxon 5 at the end of 2011-12 there has been no relegation.

The league was created in 2011-12 as a single division but split into north and south regions for 2013–14.

== Participating Clubs 2016-17 ==
=== North ===
- Abingdon II
- Aylesbury III
- Banbury III
- Bicester III
- Chipping Norton II
- Gosford All Blacks II
- Grove III
- Harwell II
- Wheatley II
- Witney IV

=== South ===
- Didcot II
- High Wycombe III
- Hungerford II
- Marlow III
- Phoenix II
- Reading Abbey IV
- Slough II
- Tadley III
- Thatcham III
- Windsor IV

== Berks/Bucks & Oxon 4 Honours ==
Berks/Bucks & Oxon 4 Honours
| Season | No of Teams | Champions | Runners–up | Relegated Teams | League Name |
| 2011-12 | 9 | Newbury III | Drifters II (and 6 others also promoted) (Note: Due to the folding of Berks/Bucks & Oxon 5 multiple teams were promoted from this division into either Berks/Bucks & Oxon 3 North or Berks/Bucks & Oxon 3 South depending on geographical location. Teams from the discontinued division would then populate Berks/Bucks & Oxon 4 for the following season.) | No relegation | Berks/Bucks & Oxon 4 |
| 2012-13 | 9 | Grove III | Reading IV | No relegation | Berks/Bucks & Oxon 4 (Note: The following season the league would split into two regional divisions - north and south.) |
| 2013-14 | 7 | Gosford All Blacks II | Abingdon II | No relegation | Berks/Bucks & Oxon 4 North |
| 2013-14 | 5 | Reading IV | Windsor IV | No relegation | Berks/Bucks & Oxon 4 South |
| 2014-15 | 8 | Hungerford II | Buckingham III | No relegation | Berks/Bucks & Oxon 4 North |
| 2014-15 | 7 | Redingensians IV | Slough II | No relegation | Berks/Bucks & Oxon 4 South |
| 2015-16 | 8 | Buckingham III | Abingdon II | No relegation | Berks/Bucks & Oxon 4 North |
| 2015-16 | 7 | Reading Abbey III | Windsor IV | No relegation | Berks/Bucks & Oxon 4 South |
| 2016-17 | 7 | Banbury III | Wheatley II | No relegation | Berks/Bucks & Oxon 4 North |
| 2016-17 | 10 | Reading Abbey IV (Note: Despite winning Berks/Bucks & Oxon 4 South, Reading Abbey IV were not promoted as Reading Abbey III were in the division above.) | Hungerford II | No relegation | Berks/Bucks & Oxon 4 South |
| 2017-18 | 7 | | | | |
| 2017-18 | 10 | | | | |
Green backgrounds are promotion places.

== See also ==
- Berkshire RFU
- Buckinghamshire RFU
- Oxfordshire RFU
- English rugby union system
- Rugby union in England
