= Berks/Bucks & Oxon Championship =

English rugby union division

- Current season or competition: 2019–20 Berks/Bucks & Oxon Championship
- Sport: Rugby union
- Instituted: 1987; 39 years ago (as Bucks/Oxon 2)
- Ceased: 2019; 7 years ago
- Number of teams: 7
- Country: England
- Holders: Chipping Norton (1st title) (2018–19) (promoted to Berks/Bucks & Oxon Premier)
- Most titles: Drifters, Wheatley (4 titles)
- Website: englandrugby.com

Berks, Bucks and Oxon Championship was a division at level 9 of the English rugby union system featuring teams from Berkshire, Buckinghamshire and Oxfordshire. Promoted teams moved up to the Berks/Bucks & Oxon Premier and there was no relegation. Each year three teams (one each from the Berkshire, Buckinghamshire and Oxfordshire unions) were picked to take part in the RFU Junior Vase (a national cup competition for clubs at levels 9–12).

Originally the league was set up as Bucks & Oxon 2 and then Berks/Bucks & Oxon 2 before being disbanded in 2003–04 as the league was restructured to cater for the joining of many second, third and fourth teams and was split into regional divisions. The league returned in 2011–12 to contain only first teams (along with Berks/Bucks & Oxon Premier) while the second, third and fourth teams were transferred to newly created regional leagues with Berks/Bucks & Oxon 1 at the pinnacle and no possibility of promotion to the championship or the league system above it.

At the end of the 2018–19 the league was discontinued. Teams that were not promoted into the Berks/Bucks & Oxon Premier were transferred into regional Berks/Bucks & Oxon leagues.

== Teams 2019–20 ==
Team	Ground	Capacity	Town/Village	Previous season
Aldermaston	AWE Recreation Society		Aldermaston, Berkshire	3rd
Berkshire Shire Hall	Berkshire County Sports Club		Sonning, Reading, Berkshire	6th
Bletchley	Manor Fields		Bletchley, Milton Keynes, Buckinghamshire	Relegated from BBO Premier (10th)
Faringdon	Folly Sports Park		Faringdon, Oxfordshire	5th
Harwell	AEA Sports Ground		Harwell, Oxfordshire	7th
Phoenix	The Sports Ground		Taplow, Buckinghamshire	4th
Risborough	Princes Risborough School		Princes Risborough, Buckinghamshire	Relegated from BBO Premier (11th)

Locations of the 2019-20 Berks/Bucks & Oxon Championship teams in Oxfordshire
Locations of the 2019-20 Berks/Bucks & Oxon Championship teams in Berkshire
Locations of the 2019-20 Berks/Bucks & Oxon Championship teams in Buckinghamshire

== Teams 2018–19 ==
Team	Ground	Capacity	Town/Village	Previous season
Abingdon	Southern Sports Park		Abingdon, Oxfordshire	Relegated from Berks/Bucks & Oxon Premier (10th)
Aldermaston	AWE Recreation Society		Aldermaston, Berkshire	3rd
Berkshire Shire Hall	Berkshire County Sports Club		Sonning, Reading, Berkshire	6th
Chipping Norton	Greystones		Chipping Norton, Oxfordshire	4th
Faringdon	Folly Sports Park		Faringdon, Oxfordshire	8th
Harwell	AEA Sports Ground		Harwell, Oxfordshire	7th
Phoenix	The Sports Ground		Taplow, Buckinghamshire	5th

Locations of the 2018-19 Berks/Bucks & Oxon Championship teams in Oxfordshire
Locations of the 2018-19 Berks/Bucks & Oxon Championship teams in Berkshire
Locations of the 2018-19 Berks/Bucks & Oxon Championship teams in Buckinghamshire

== Teams 2017–18 ==
Team	Ground	Capacity	Town/Village	Previous season
Aldermaston	AWE Recreation Society		Aldermaston, Berkshire	8th
Berkshire Shire Hall	Berkshire County Sports Club		Sonning, Reading, Berkshire	3rd
Chipping Norton	Greystones		Chipping Norton, Oxfordshire	4th
Faringdon	Folly Sports Park		Faringdon, Oxfordshire	7th
Farnham Royal	Farnham Park		Farnham Royal, Buckinghamshire	9th
Harwell	AEA Sports Ground		Harwell, Oxfordshire	6th
Oxford	St. Peter's Recreation Ground		North Hinksey, Oxford, Oxfordshire	5th
Phoenix	The Sports Ground		Taplow, Buckinghamshire	Relegated from Berks/Bucks & Oxon Premier (10th)
Risborough	Princes Risborough School		Princes Risborough, Buckinghamshire	Relegated from Berks/Bucks & Oxon Premier (11th)

Locations of the 2017-18 Berks/Bucks & Oxon Championship teams in Oxfordshire
Locations of the 2017-18 Berks/Bucks & Oxon Championship teams in Berkshire
Locations of the 2017-18 Berks/Bucks & Oxon Championship teams in Buckinghamshire

== Participating clubs ==
=== 2016–17 ===
- Aldermaston
- Berkshire Shire Hall
- Chipping Norton (relegated from Berks/Bucks & Oxon Premier)
- Faringdon
- Farnham
- Harwell
- Littlemore
- Oxford
- Wheatley (relegated from Berks/Bucks & Oxon Premier)

=== 2015–16 ===
The 2015–16 Berks/Bucks & Oxon Championship consisted of nine teams; five from Oxfordshire and two each from Berkshire and Buckinghamshire. The season started on 12 September 2015 and was due to end on 23 April 2016.

==== Participating teams and location ====
Six of the twelve teams participated in last season's competition. The 2014–15 champions Risborough were promoted to the Berks/Bucks & Oxon Premier along with runners up, Crowthorne while Oxford are new to the league having previously been playing friendly matches over the past season. As the basement league in Berks/Bucks & Oxon there was no relegation - although there are a number of leagues below it, mainly for second teams.

Locations of the 2015-16 Berks/Bucks & Oxon Championship teams in Oxfordshire
Locations of the 2015-16 Berks/Bucks & Oxon Championship teams in Berkshire & Buckinghamshire

Team	Ground	Capacity	Town/Village	Previous season
Aldermaston	AWE Recreation Society		Aldermaston, Berkshire	7th
Berkshire Shire Hall	Berkshire County Sports Club		Sonning, Reading, Berkshire	5th
Didcot	Edmunds Park		Didcot, Oxfordshire	4th
Faringdon	Folly Sports Park		Faringdon, Oxfordshire	8th
Farnham Royal	Farnham Park		Farnham Royal, Buckinghamshire	6th
Harwell	AEA Sports Ground		Harwell, Oxfordshire	3rd
Littlemore	Oxford Academy Playing Fields		Oxford, Oxfordshire	Relegated from Berks/Bucks & Oxon Premier (11th)
Oxford	St. Peter's Recreation Ground		North Hinksey, Oxford, Oxfordshire	N/A - joined league
Phoenix	The Sports Ground		Taplow, Buckinghamshire	Relegated from Berks/Bucks & Oxon Premier (10th)

=== 2014–15 ===
- Aldermaston
- Berkshire Shire Hall
- Crowthorne
- Didcot
- Faringdon
- Farnham Royal (relegated from Berks/Bucks & Oxon Premier)
- Harwell
- Risborough

=== 2013–14 ===
- Abingdon
- Aldermaston
- Berkshire Shire Hall
- Crowthorne
- Didcot
- Faringdon
- Harwell (relegated from Berks/Bucks & Oxon Premier)
- Kingsclere
- Risborough (relegated from Berks/Bucks & Oxon Premier)
- Wheatley
- Winslow

=== 2012–13 ===
- Abingdon
- Aldermaston
- Berkshire Shire Hall
- Chesham
- Crowthorne
- Didcot
- Farnham Royal
- Faringdon
- Kingsclere
- Wheatley
- Winslow

== Original teams ==
When league rugby began in 1987 this division (known as Bucks/Oxon 2) contained the following teams from Buckinghamshire and Oxfordshire:

- Chesham
- Chipping Norton
- Cholsey
- Drifters
- Gosford All Blacks
- Harwell
- Milton Keynes
- Olney
- Phoenix
- Wheatley

== Berks/Bucks & Oxon Championship honours ==
=== Bucks/Oxon 2 (1987–1993) ===
Originally known as Bucks/Oxon 2, it was a level 9 league for clubs based in Buckinghamshire and Oxfordshire. (Note: Berkshire based clubs would not join the division until 2000, having originally been involved in the Berks/Dorset/Wilts leagues.) Promotion was to Bucks/Oxon 1 and there was no relegation.

Bucks/Oxon 2
Season	No of teams	Champions	Runners–up	Relegated team(s)	Ref
1987–88	10	Drifters	Milton Keynes	No relegation	
1988–89	10	Cholsey	Olney	No relegation	
1989–90	10	Wheatley	Didcot	No relegation	
1990–91	10	Bicester	Witney	No relegation	
1991–92	12	Drifters	Chesham (Note: Due to the restructuring of Bucks/Oxon 1 to 13 teams, four teams were promoted including 3rd and 4th place Abingdon and Buckingham.)	No relegation	
1992–93	9	Littlemore	Chipping Norton	No relegation	
Green backgrounds are promotion places.

=== Bucks/Oxon 2 (1993–1996) ===
The creation of National League 5 South for the 1993–94 season meant that Bucks/Oxon 2 dropped to become a tier 10 league. Promotion continued to Bucks/Oxon 1 and there was no relegation. The division would be cancelled after the 1995–96 due to the merging of the two Bucks/Oxon divisions into a single league known as Bucks/Oxon.

Bucks/Oxon 2
Season	No of teams	Champions	Runners–up	Relegated team(s)	Ref
1993–94	9	Phoenix	Buckingham	No relegation	
1994–95	8	Wheatley	Chipping Norton	No relegation	
1995–96	9	Drifters	Littlemore (Note: Due to the merging of Bucks/Oxon 1 and Bucks/Oxon 2 into a single division ahead of the 1996–97 season, all clubs were promoted including Gosford All Blacks, Cholsey, Abingdon, Hanwell and Didcot. Winslow would drop out before the start of the new season.)	No relegation	
Green backgrounds are promotion places.

=== Bucks/Oxon 2 (1997–1999) ===
The resplitting of Bucks/Oxon into two divisions ahead of the 1997–98 season, saw the return of Bucks/Oxon 2 after a single season - this time as a tier 9 league. Promotion continued to Bucks/Oxon 1 and there was no relegation. After two seasons the division was cancelled again due to the remerging of Bucks/Oxon 1 and Bucks/Oxon 2 into a single Bucks/Oxon division.

Bucks/Oxon 2
Season	No of teams	Champions	Runners–up	Relegated team(s)	Ref
1997–98	6	Chesham	Abingdon	No relegation	
1998–99	6	Wheatley	Didcot (Note: Bucks & Oxon 2 and the league above merged into one division – Bucks & Oxon – for the following season.)	No relegation	
Green backgrounds are promotion places.

=== Berks/Bucks & Oxon 2 (2000–2004) ===
Restructuring ahead of the 2000–01 season would see Berkshire based clubs join the Bucks & Oxon leagues. (Note: Previously Berkshire clubs played in the Berks/Dorset/Wilts leagues.) This also saw the reintroduction of Bucks/Oxon 2, remaining a tier 9 league, but this time called Berks/Bucks & Oxon 2. Promotion was to Berks/Bucks & Oxon 1 (formerly Bucks/Oxon 1) and there was no relegation. At the end of the 2003–04 season, the renaming of Berks/Bucks & Oxon 1 to Berks/Bucks & Oxon Premier, meant that Berks/Bucks & Oxon 2 would be cancelled and all clubs transferred to the new regionalised Berks/Bucks & Oxon 1 (replacing Berks/Bucks & Oxon 2).

Berks/Bucks & Oxon 2
Season	No of teams	Champions	Runners–up	Relegated team(s)	Ref
2000–01	8	Wheatley	Henley Wanderers	No relegation	
2001–02	7	Littlemore	Aldermaston	No relegation	
2002–03	8	Bletchley	Chesham	No relegation	
2003–04	9	Drifters	Harwell (Note: Berks/Bucks & Oxon 2 would be split into regional divisions for the next season - the top 5 teams (Drifters, Harwell, Gosford All Blacks, Farnham Royal and Littlemore) would be promoted up to the newly named Berks/Bucks & Oxon Premier.)	Multiple teams (Note: Due to the restructuring of the Berks/Bucks & Oxon leagues, Berks/Bucks & Oxon 2 would be split into regional divisions for the next season - 4 teams would be relegated to one of the newly created divisions - what is now Berks/Bucks & Oxon 1. The relegated clubs were Winslow, Berkshire Shire Hall, Abingdon and Wheatley)	
Green backgrounds are promotion places.

=== Berks/Bucks & Oxon Championship (2011–2019) ===
The Berks/Bucks & Oxon Championship was introduced as a tier 9 league ahead of the 2011–12 season, replacing Berks/Bucks & Oxon 1 as the second division Berks/Bucks & Oxon league. Promotion was to the Berks/Bucks & Oxon Premier and there was no relegation.

Berks/Bucks & Oxon Championship Honours
Season	No of teams	Champions	Runners–up	Relegated team(s)	Ref
2011–12	12	Harwell	Aylesbury Athletic	No relegation	
2012–13	11	Farnham Royal	Chesham	No relegation	
2013–14	10	Abingdon	Wheatley	No relegation	
2014–15	8	Risborough	Crowthorne	No relegation	
2015–16	9	Phoenix	Didcot	No relegation	
2016–17	9	Littlemore	Wheatley	No relegation	
2017–18	9	Risborough	Oxford	No relegation	
2018–19	7 (Note: Would reduce from 9 to 7 teams after Farnham Royal dropped out and only one team was relegated into the league from the division above.)	Chipping Norton	Abingdon	No relegation	
Green backgrounds are promotion places.

== Number of league titles ==
- Drifters (4) (Note: Drifters titles include three wins when league was known as Bucks/Oxon 2.)
- Wheatley (4) (Note: Wheatley's titles include three wins when league was known as Bucks/Oxon 2.)
- Littlemore (3) (Note: One of Littlemore's titles was won when league was known as Bucks/Oxon 2, another when league was known as Berks/Bucks & Oxon 2.)
- Phoenix (2) (Note: One of Phoenix's titles was won when league was known as Bucks/Oxon 2.)
- Risborough (2)
- Abingdon (1)
- Bicester (1) (Note: Bicester's title was won when league was known as Bucks/Oxon 2.)
- Bletchley (1)
- Chesham (1) (Note: Chesham's title was won when league was known as Bucks/Oxon 2.)
- Chipping Norton (1)
- Cholsey (1) (Note: Cholsey's title was won when league was known as Bucks/Oxon 2.)
- Farnham Royal (1)
- Harwell (1)

== See also ==
- South West Division RFU
- Berkshire RFU
- Buckinghamshire RFU
- Oxfordshire RFU
- English rugby union system
- Rugby union in England
