= Oxford Harlequins RFC =

English rugby union club, based in Oxfordshire

(England) Oxford Quins RFC
- Full name: Oxford Quins Rugby Football Club
- Union: Oxfordshire RFU
- Nickname: Oxford Quins
- Founded: 1996; 30 years ago
- Location: Horspath Road, Oxford, Oxfordshire, England
- Region: National Leagues
- Ground: Horspath Sports Ground (Capacity: 1,000)
- President: Ron MacDonald
- Coach(es): Pete Davies (men); Fin Kelly & Charlotte Barras (women)
- Captain: Josh Archer
- Top scorer: Ewan Fox
- League: National League 2 East
- 2025–26: 14th (relegated to Regional 1 Midlands)

Official website
- www.oxfordharlequins.club

Oxford Harlequins (Oxford Quins) Rugby Football Club is a rugby union club based in Oxford, England. The men's 1st XV currently play in Regional 1 Midlands following their relegation from National League 2 East, a level 5 league in the English rugby union system at the end of the 2025–26 season. As of September 2024, the women's 1st XV compete in National Challenge 1 Midlands, level 4 of the England Rugby women's club championship.

The men's 2nd and 3rd XV's compete in Southern North, South West Division and the Berks Bucks & Oxon North, South West Division respectively and the women's 2nd XV compete in National Challenge 2 in the women's club championship.

== History ==
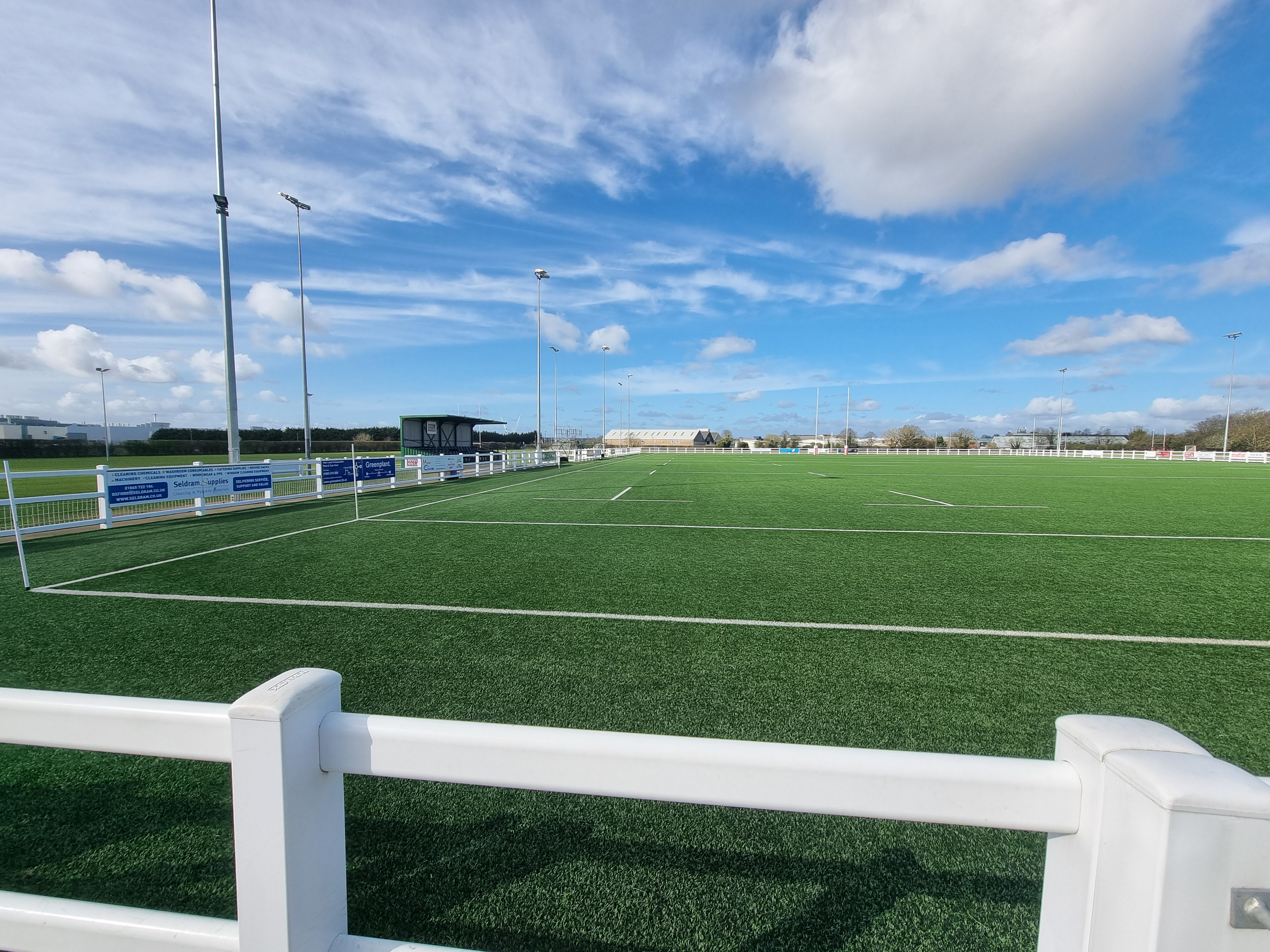
The Horspath Road ground in 2025

Oxford Harlequins RFC was formed in 1996 following the merger of Oxford Marathons RFC and Oxford Old Boys RFC.

In 2015 a possible merger between Oxford RFC and Oxford Harlequins failed to materialise and Oxford Quins moved their matches to Marston Ferry Road. In 2018 Oxford Harlequins moved from Marston Ferry Road to Horspath Sports Ground following the grant of a 30-year lease on the ground from Oxford City Council and the decision by the RFU to invest over £750,000 to build a new floodlit artificial turf rugby pitch at the new site.

Following the appointment of Pete Davies in 2019, the men's 1st XV achieved its highest league finish since the 2015–16 season before the season was curtailed by the national lockdowns of March 2020. Pete Davies was appointed as men's head coach in August 2019.

The 2020–21 season was cancelled due to the Covid Pandemic and subsequent lockdowns and in July 2021 Oxford Harlequins adopted a new brand and logo, dropping the "Harlequins" in favour of "Quins" and replacing the logo with a more modern design.

In May 2021, the club launched the inaugural Lord Mayor's Festival of Rugby in collaboration with Oxford City Council. The festival raised money for the Lord Mayor's charities and introduced an event where teams compete for the Lord Mayor's Men's Cup, Plate and Bowl, Women's Cup and Under 18 Boys' Cup. Following the success of the inaugural festival it became an annual event.

The 2021–22 season was a record-breaking season for Oxford Quins men's 1st XV, in which the team, under co-captains Allan Purchase & Nick Marshall, won 25 out of 26 league matches, scored 1046 points, amassed 20 try bonus points, and despite starting their campaign with a -5 points deduction, still managed to win the league and, as league champions, were awarded promotion to tier 5 of the England Rugby Club Championship.

Oxford Quins Men's 1st XV spent one season (2022–2023) in Regional 1 London & South East and achieved a top four finish and being moved to Regional 1 Midlands for the 2023–24 season.

By Sept 2022 Oxford Quins men's section had sufficient playing numbers to relaunch a Men's 3rd XV in Berkshire Buckinghamshire Oxfordshire (BBO) 3 North, tier 10 of the RFU Club Championship. Led by their captain, Henry Folds, and former Oxford Quins Director of Rugby Alan Hancock, the Oxford Quins became league champions and won promotion to tier 9 of the RFU Club Championship.

In the 2022–23 season the 3rd XV achieved a second successive league win and were promoted to Level 8 of the RFU Rugby Pyramid, Counties 1.

The 2023–24 league campaign was a two-horse race between Oxford Quins and Stourbridge as both clubs opened a gap between themselves and the rest, by Christmas, Quins had beaten Stourbridge away and only dropped one match opening up a 5-point lead. On 6 January 2024, Quins beat Stourbridge at home 18-13 and remained 10 points clear until 16 March 2024, where a 7–54 away win at Banbury resulted in Oxford Quins winning the league with two rounds left and they were promoted to the National Leagues for the 2024–25 season.

== The Brookes– Quins partnership ==
Ahead of the 2019–20 season Oxford Brookes RFC moved operations from Marston Ferry Road to Horspath Sports Ground. In July 2020, Oxford Quins and Oxford Brookes collaborated to create a partnership between the two institutions, subsequently, forming the Brookes Quins Partnership.

In August 2022 former Premiership player, Tom Varndell, was appointed as Head of Community at Oxford Quins and Head of Men's Rugby at Oxford Brookes University in a new combined role under the Brookes Quins Partnership umbrella. Varndell also registered with Oxford Quins men's 1st XV as an amateur player.

== Women's rugby ==
In September 2020, Oxford Quins launched a Women's Section with the appointment of Pat Metcalfe-Jones as Women's Head Coach. At the time of her appointment, Metcalfe-Jones was the head coach & a player at Oxford University Women's RFC having previously been the Head Coach at Oxford Brookes University. She had combined her role as player/coach at Oxford University with playing Premiership Rugby for Richmond in the RFU Tyrell's Premier 15s (as of 2022 known as the Allianz Premier 15s). Upon her appointment to the Brookes Quins Partnership Metcalfe-Jones took on a newly created dual role as Head of Women's Rugby at both Oxford Quins and Oxford Brookes, the former Harlequins & Richmond Premiership player leading the new combined women's program under the Brookes Quins umbrella.

The newly formed Women's 1st XV at Oxford Quins was entered into Level 4 of the RFU Women's Championship, National Challenge 1, for the 2021–22 season. In September 2021 former England International Charlotte "Beanie" Barras was appointed as Women's Assistant Coach at Oxford Quins, working under Metcalfe-Jones. Barras scored the only try for England in the 2010 Rugby World Cup Final against New Zealand. In their first season, Oxford Quins Women's 1st XV finished 5th in NC1 South East finishing the season with a 51–37 win over Drybrook, a team that they had lost to 39–0 in their first league match of the season and squad numbers had grown sufficiently to enable the creation of a Women's 2nd XV for the 2022–23 season: the new 2nd XV were entered into tier 5 of the RFU Women's Championship, National Challenge 2.

Pat Metcalfe-Jones was appointed the women's head coach for the 2022–23 season is (more info on Metcalfe-Jones below). At the start of the 2023–24 season Metcalfe-Jones left to work at Ealing Trailfinders and Fin Kelly was appointed head coach of the Brookes Quins Partnership women's section covering Oxford Quins and Oxford Brookes rugby.

== Oxford 7s ==
In April 2022 Oxford Quins relaunched the Oxford 7s. The Oxford 7s inaugural competition featured an elite men's competition with teams from Jamaica 7s, WildDogs 7s, Apache 7s, Oxford Quins 7s, CRX Malborough, Oxford Brookes & Oxford Barbarians and was won by CRX Malborough. An inaugural women's competition featured teams from Oxford University 7s, Oxford Quins 7s, Oxford Brookes 7s & Chinnor Kites and was won by Oxford Brookes 7s. The men's open featured teams from across the region and was won by the Stiff Richards. The Oxford 7s is played annually.

== Academy and Youth Section ==
The club runs an Under-16 to Under-18 academy: In 2019-20 former Tonga International Kenni Fisilau was appointed as head coach of the Oxford Quins Academy. Oxford Quins runs junior youth sections for boys and girls aged 5 to 18. As of 2018 the youth section was one of the largest in Oxfordshire with over 450 players.

In September 2021, the U18 Bullingdon Cup competition was created between Oxford Quins U-18 Boy's Academy 1st XV and St Edwards's (Teddies) 1st XV. The remnants of Bullingdon Green form part of Oxford Quins ground at Horspath Recreation ground and was the site of one of the oldest rugby fixtures in Oxford, 9 years after St Edward's Oxford was founded, in which Oxford Military College played an annual fixture against St Edward's 1st XV between 1874 & 1876 on Bullingdon Green.

== Honours (Oxford Harlequins) ==
Men's 1st team:

- Southern Counties North Champions: 2001–02
- South West Division 1 East Champions (3): 2002–03, 2013–14, 2021–22
- Oxfordshire RFU County Cup Winners (7): 2004, 2006, 2007, 2008, 2009, 2014, 2023 (Note: Oxford Quins have 10 cup wins if you count the 3 titles won by Oxford Old Boys (who merged with Oxford Marathons to form the Harlequins in 1996).)
- Regional 1 Midlands Champions: 2023–24

Men's 2nd team:

- Berks/Bucks & Oxon Premier A Champions: 2006–07
- Counties 2 Berks/Bucks/Oxon Champions: 2022–23
- Oxfordshire RFU County Cup Bowl Winners 2022–23

Men's 3rd team:

- Berks/Bucks & Oxon 3 Champions: 2021–22
- Counties 3 Berks/Bucks/Oxon Champions: 2022–23
- Oxfordshire RFU County Cup Bowl Winners 2022–23

Men's 4th team:

- Berks/Bucks & Oxon 2 South Champions: 2004–05

== Honours (founder clubs) ==
Oxford Marathon

- Bucks/Oxon 1 champions: 1992–93

Oxford Old Boys

- Oxfordshire RFU County Cup winners (3): 1972, 1974, 1984
- Bucks/Oxon 1 champions: 1995–96
- Middlesex Sevens finalists: 1982

== Current standings ==
2025–26 National League 2 East table
Pos	Team	Pld	W	D	L	PF	PA	PD	TB	LB	Pts	Qualification
1	Bury St Edmunds (C)	26	20	1	5	1128	659	+469	22	4	108	Promotion place
2	Oundle	26	20	2	4	940	713	+227	21	1	106	Promotion Play-off
3	Old Albanian	26	18	0	8	1009	813	+196	22	3	97	
4	Barnes	26	16	1	9	738	598	+140	15	5	86	
5	Canterbury	26	16	0	10	851	644	+207	16	6	86	
6	Dorking	26	14	2	10	798	598	+200	13	6	79	
7	Westcombe Park	26	12	0	14	851	751	+100	19	8	75	
8	Havant	26	11	1	14	840	960	−120	19	1	66	
9	London Welsh	26	10	0	16	705	866	−161	16	8	64	
10	Guernsey Raiders	26	11	1	14	690	875	−185	13	3	62	
11	Esher	26	10	0	16	844	831	+13	16	6	62	
12	Henley Hawks	26	9	2	15	693	665	+28	12	9	61	Relegation Play-off
13	Sevenoaks (R)	26	8	0	18	743	900	−157	12	5	49	Relegation place
14	Oxford Harlequins (R)	26	2	0	24	505	1462	−957	11	2	21	Relegation place

Updated to match(es) played on 2 May 2026. Source: National League Rugby
Rules for classification: If teams are level at any stage, tiebreakers are applied in the following order:
1. Number of matches won
2. Number of matches drawn
3. Difference between points for and against
4. Total number of points for
5. Aggregate number of points scored in matches between tied teams
6. Number of matches won excluding the first match, then the second and so on until the tie is settled
