= Oxford Brookes University RFC =

English Rugby club

(England) Oxford Brookes University RFC
- Full name: Oxford Brookes University Rugby Football Club
- Union: Oxfordshire RFU
- Nickname(s): OBURFC
- Founded: 2014; 11 years ago
- Location: Horspath Road, Oxford, Oxfordshire, England
- Ground(s): Horspath Sports Ground, Oxford (Capacity: 500)
- Captain(s): George Amphlett, Ned Potter
- League(s): BUCS Midlands 2B
- 2019–20: 1st
Team kit

Official website
- twitter.com/OBURFC

Oxford Brookes University Rugby Football Club is a rugby union university club based in Oxford, Oxfordshire, England. In the 2017–18 season OBURFC 1st XV gained promotion into BUCS Midlands 1A which is level four of the BUCS rugby union system, although they are currently in BUCS Midlands 2B. Director of Rugby is Joe Winpenny.

== History ==
The club reformed in 2014. OBURFC are one of two university Rugby Clubs representing in the City of Oxford, Oxfordshire, England, along with University of Oxford RFC.

== Current situation ==
The club reformed in 2014 with the 1st XV playing in BUCS Midlands 1A. The following years saw the 1st XV get relegated in the 2015–16 season to BUCS Midlands 2B, while the 2nd XV plying their trade in BUCS Midlands 3B following promotion the season before.

In 2017 the 1st XV saw their first bit of silverware in nearly a decade winning a league and cup double in the 2017–18 season. This season unfortunately saw the 2nd XV relegated from BUCS Midlands 2A down to BUCS Midlands 3A. Come the 2018–19 seasons the 1st and 2nd XV had very different challenges in front of them. Upon the end of the season the 1st XV were unfortunately relegated from BUCS Midlands 1A after an extremely close season throughout the year with gaps of just four points for the majority of the time. The 2nd XV however gained promotion back to BUCS Midlands 2A while only losing once.

Ahead of the 2019–20 season the club moved operations from Oxford R.F.C. over to Oxford Harlequins.

The 2019–20 season brought forward the re-introduction of a 3rd XV to competitive BUCS action. This saw the 1st XV playing in BUCS Midlands 2B, the 2nd XV playing in BUCS Midlands 2A and the 3rd XV in BUCS Midlands 5A. The 1st and 3rd XV both won the BUCS Conference Cup and Plate respectfully, along with both teams finishing top of their leagues unbeaten. The 2nd XV finished 3rd in BUCS Midlands 2A. Due to the COVID-19 pandemic the BUCS calendar was abruptly cut short leaving promotion for both teams in uncertainty. Nevertheless, the 1st XV has replicated what they had not two years previous.

== Honours ==
On Field

1st XV:

- BUCS Midlands 1A champions: 2004-05
- BUCS Midlands 2B champions: 2017–18, 2019-20 (Pending)
- BUCS Midlands Conference Cup champions: 2017–18, 2019–20

2nd XV:

- BUCS Midlands 2B champions: 2010-11
- BUCS Midlands 3B champions: 2016–17, 2018–19
- BUCS Midlands 4A champions: 2014-15
- BUCS Midlands Conference Plate runners-up: 2014-15

3rd XV:

- BUCS Midlands 5A champions: 2019-20 (Pending)
- BUCS Midlands Conference Plate champions: 2019-20

4th XV:

- OURFC Colleges League Division 3 champions: 2019-20 (Hillary Term 2)
- OURFC Colleges League Division 4 champions: 2019-20 (Michaelmas Term 1)

Off Field

- Brookes Sport Coach of the Year: Joe Winpenny - 2017-18
- Brookes Sport Sportsman of the Year: Angus Johnson - 2017-18
