= Berks/Bucks & Oxon 3 =

English rugby union league

- Current season or competition: 2016–17 Berks/Bucks & Oxon 3
- Sport: Rugby union
- Instituted: 2011; 15 years ago
- Number of teams: 9
- Country: England
- Holders: Bicester II (2nd title) (2016–17) (promoted to Berks/Bucks & Oxon 2)
- Most titles: Bicester II (2 titles)
- Website: englandrugby.com

Berks, Bucks and Oxon Division 3 is an English rugby union league featuring teams from Berkshire, Buckinghamshire and Oxfordshire. As with all of the divisions in this area at this level, the entire league is made up of second, third and fourth teams of clubs whose first teams play at a higher level of the rugby union pyramid. Promoted teams move up to Berks/Bucks & Oxon 2 while relegated teams drop to Berks/Bucks & Oxon 4 - north or south - depending on location.

The league was introduced in 2011 originally as a single division, splitting into regional divisions for the 2012 and 2013 seasons, before returning to the original format.

== Participating Clubs 2016-17 ==
- Bicester II
- Bracknell III
- Buckingham III
- Grove II
- Maidenhead III
- Reading III
- Reading Abbey III
- Tadley II
- Wallingford II

== Berks/Bucks & Oxon 3 Honours ==
Berks/Bucks & Oxon 3 North Honours
Season	No of Teams	Champions	Runners–up	Relegated Teams	League Name
2011-12	10	Bicester II	Alchester II	No relegation	Berks/Bucks & Oxon 3 (Note: Berks/Bucks & Oxon 3 would split into two regional divisions - North and South - for the next season.)
2012-13	9	Amersham & Chiltern III	Drifters II	Gosford All Blacks II	Berks/Bucks & Oxon 3 North
2012-13	10	Newbury III	Windsor III	Hungerford II, Phoenix II	Berks/Bucks & Oxon 3 South
2013-14	7	Aylesbury II	Henley IV	High Wycombe III	Berks/Bucks & Oxon 3 North (Note: For the following season Berks/Bucks & Oxon 3 North and South would merge into one league - Berks/Bucks & Oxon 3.)
2013-14	6	Thatcham II	Reading III	Slough II	Berks/Bucks & Oxon 3 South (Note: For the following season Berks/Bucks & Oxon 3 South and North would merge into one league - Berks/Bucks & Oxon 3.)
2014-15	8	Henley IV	Tadley II	Bracknell III	Berks/Bucks & Oxon 3
2015-16	9	Redingensians IV	Windsor III	Hungerford II, Maidenhead III	Berks/Bucks & Oxon 3
2016-17	9	Bicester II	Bracknell III	Maidenhead III, Buckingham III	Berks/Bucks & Oxon 3
2017-18	9				
Green backgrounds are promotion places.

== See also ==
- Berkshire RFU
- Buckinghamshire RFU
- Oxfordshire RFU
- English rugby union system
- Rugby union in England
