= Jim Parsons (rugby union) =

English rugby union player (1943–2026)

- Full name: Michael James Parsons
- Born: 13 March 1943 Chipping Norton, England
- Died: 22 February 2026 (aged 82) Oxford, England
- School: The King's School, Canterbury

Rugby union career
- Position: Lock
International career
| Years | Team | Apps | (Points) |
| 1968 | England | 4 | (0) |

Michael James Parsons (13 March 1943 – 22 February 2026) was an English international rugby union player.

== Life and career ==
Parsons was educated at The King's School, Canterbury.

An Oxfordshire farmer, Parsons played his rugby for Oxford and Northampton.

Parsons was capped four times by England as a lock in the 1968 Five Nations Championship, introduced as one of eight debutants against Wales at Twickenham. A knee injury brought an end to his career soon after.

Parsons died at the John Radcliffe Hospital in Oxford, on 22 February 2026, at the age of 82.

== See also ==
- List of England national rugby union players
