= Andy Gomarsall =

England international rugby union player

Andy Gomarsall MBE
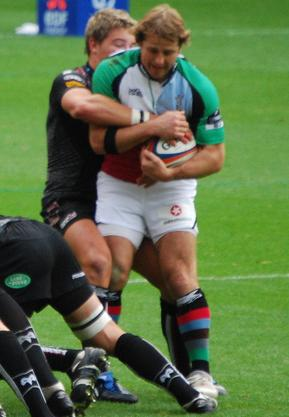
- Gomarsall in 2008
- Born: Andrew Charles Thomas Gomarsall; 24 July 1974 (age 52) Durham, England
- Height: 5 ft 10in (1.77 m)
- Weight: 14 st 2 lb (90 kg)
- School: Audley House Prep School; Bedford SchoolOxford Brookes University

Rugby union career
- Position: Scrum-half
Senior career
| Years | Team | Apps | (Points) |
- Bicester
| 1993–1999 | Wasps | 82 | (75) |
| 1999 | → Bath | 2 | (0) |
| 1999–2001 | Bedford | 24 | (78) |
| 2001–2005 | Gloucester | 137 | (106) |
| 2005–2006 | Worcester | 28 | (15) |
| 2006–2009 | Harlequins | 64 | (13) |
| 2009–2010 | Leeds Carnegie | 21 | (0) |
- Correct as of 6 November 2010
International career
| Years | Team | Apps | (Points) |
| 1996–2008 | England | 35 | (37) |
- Correct as of 6 November 2007

Andrew Charles Thomas Gomarsall MBE (born 24 July 1974, in Durham) is an English former rugby union player who played at scrum-half for Leeds Carnegie and England.

He previously played for Bicester, Wasps (1993-1999), Bedford (1999-2001), and Gloucester Rugby (2001-2005). Until May 2006 he was contracted to Worcester Warriors for three seasons from 2005, but was released after one year of a three-year contract. He joined Harlequins (2006-2009), then Leeds Carnegie for the 2009–2010 season.

== Playing career ==
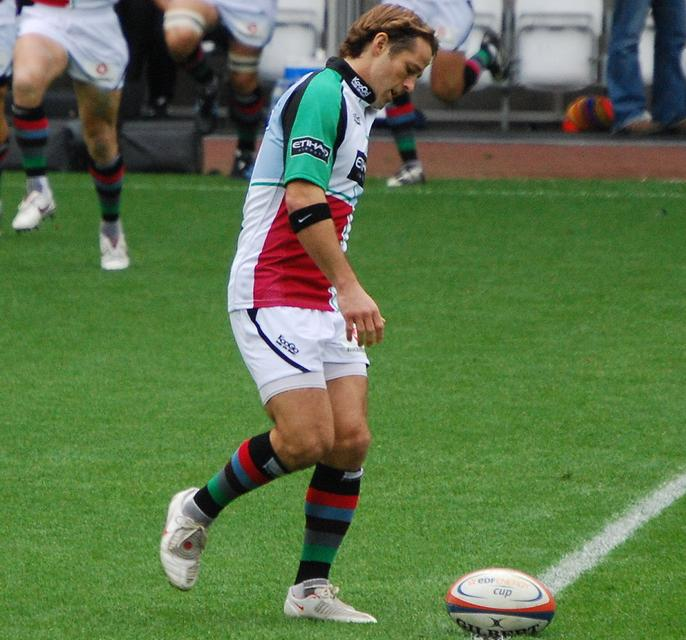
Gomarsall in action for Harlequins

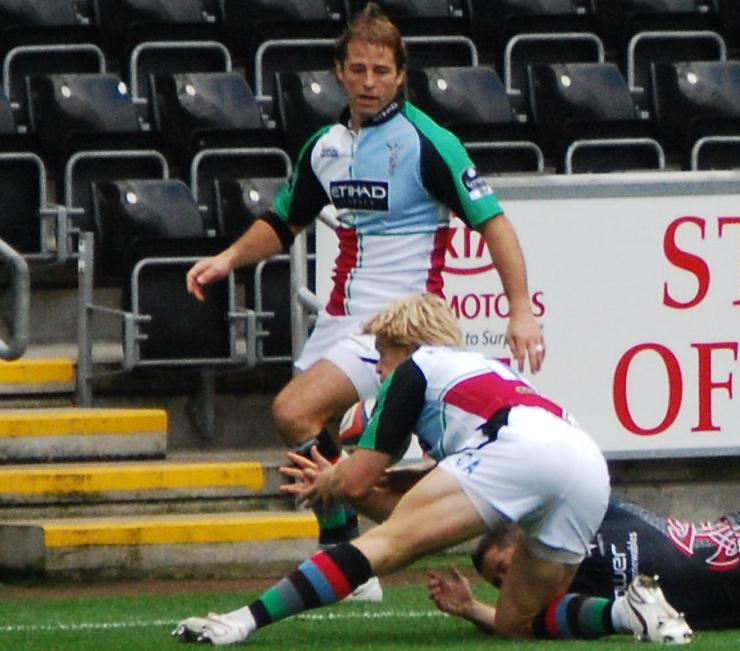
Gomarsall in action against the Ospreys

As a teenager, he played for Bicester, before joining Wasps in 1993. He was a member of London Wasps’ 1999 Powergen Cup winning side, eventually transferring to Bedford as a captain, before joining Gloucester Rugby. He was a Gloucester Rugby favourite, and participated in the 2003 Powergen Cup. He also started in the 2002 Zurich Championship Final (the year before winning the play-offs constituted winning the English title) in which Gloucester defeated Bristol Shoguns.

Gomarsall started all three of England's 2004 Autumn internationals at Twickenham and was vice captain in the England XV against the Barbarians in May as well as the Churchill Cup tour.

However, injury led to his replacement at both Gloucester Rugby and England, and so to prolong his career he signed a three-year deal with Worcester Warriors in June 2005. However, his injury worries returned to plague him, and he was released along with nine other players by Worcester in May 2006, two months short of the end of the season.

On 25 September 2006, Gomarsall signed a one year "pay-as-you-play" deal with Harlequins: ""It was shocking what happened to me and I wouldn't want that to happen to anyone else. I love rugby so much and have really missed it. I'm very grateful to Quins for giving me this opportunity.".

Gomarsall performed well for Harlequins and was selected for the England squad for the 2007 Rugby World Cup. It was his kick down the touchline that enabled Josh Lewsey to score 5 points – the eventual winning margin for England that sent them into the final against South Africa on 20 October 2007.

In 2008, Gomarsall started the first two Six Nations games before being dropped for the third against France.

== Post-playing career ==
He was a co-commentator for ITV's coverage of the 2011 Rugby World Cup.

Gomarsall is now building his father's business, Network 2 Supplies Ltd. as a director.
