= Oxfordshire RFU County Cup =

- Sport: Rugby Union
- Instituted: 1970; 56 years ago
- Number of teams: 10
- Country: England
- Holders: Oxford Harelquins (2022-23)
- Most titles: Henley Hawks / Oxford (11 titles)
- Website: Oxfordshire RFU website

The Oxfordshire RFU County Cup is an annual rugby union knock-out club competition organised by the Oxfordshire Rugby Football Union. It was first played during the 1970–71 season, with the inaugural winners being Oxford. It is the most important rugby union cup competition in Oxfordshire, ahead of the Oxfordshire RFU County Shield, It is currently held by Wallingford RFC.

The County Cup is open to club sides based in Oxfordshire playing in tier 6 (South West 1 East) and tier 7 (Southern Counties North) of the English rugby union system, 2nd teams of higher ranked clubs in the county (tiers 3–4), as well as invitee sides from outside of the league structure (e.g. university representative sides). The current format is a knock-out competition with a preliminary round, first round, semi-finals and a final played at Iffley Road in Oxford in March–April.

== Oxfordshire RFU County Cup winners ==
Oxfordshire RFU County Cup Finals / MOST RECENT TITLE
| Season | (gold) Winner | Score | Runners–up (silver) | Title Number | Venue |
1970–80
| 1970–71 | Henley Hawks | 29–28 | Oxford | Henley Hawks 1st Title | Iffley Road, Oxford |
| 1971–72 | Oxford Old Boys | 11–7 | Henley Hawks | Oxford Old Boys 1st title | |
| 1972–73 | Oxford | 24–12 | Oxford Marathons | Oxford RFC 1st Title | |
| 1973–74 | Oxford Old Boys | 18–6 | Oxford | Oxford Old Boys 2nd title | |
| 1974–75 | Oxford | 22–3 | Oxford Marathons | Oxford RFC 3rd Title | |
| 1975–76 | Oxford University Greyhounds | 18–6 | Oxford | Oxford University RFC 1st Title | |
| 1976–77 | Chinnor | 9–6 | Henley Hawks | Chinnor RFC 1st Title | |
| 1977–78 | Oxford | 10–7 | Banbury | Oxford RFC 4th Title | |
| 1978–79 | Henley Hawks | 9–3 | Oxford University Greyhounds | Henley Hawks 2nd Title | |
| 1979–80 | Oxford | 13–6 | Banbury | Oxford RFC 5th Title | |
1980–90
| 1980–81 | Oxford | 10–6 | Henley Hawks | Oxford RFC 6th Title | |
| 1981–82 | Oxford | 7–6 | Oxford Old Boys | Oxford RFC 7th Title | |
| 1982–83 | Henley Hawks | 8–7 | Bicester | Henley Hawks 3rd Title | |
| 1983–84 | Oxford Old Boys | 20–11 | Bicester | Oxford Old Boys 3rd title | |
| 1984–85 | Henley Hawks | 17–12 | Chinnor | Henley Hawks 4th Title | |
| 1985–86 | Oxford | 9–7 | Henley Hawks | Oxford RFC 8th Title | |
| 1986–87 | Oxford | 21–7 | Oxford Old Boys | Oxford RFC 9th Title | |
| 1987–88 | Oxford | 15–6 | Banbury | Oxford RFC 10th Title | |
| 1988–89 | Oxford | 29–16 | Banbury | Oxford RFC 11th Title | |
| 1989–90 | Banbury | 16–9 | Bicester | Banbury RUFC 1st Title | |
1990–2000
| 1990–91 | Henley Hawks | 13–10 | Oxford | Henley Hawks 5th Title | |
| 1991–92 | Henley Hawks | 34–23 | Oxford | Henley Hawks 6th Title | |
| 1992–93 | Henley Hawks | 13–3 | Oxford | Henley Hawks 7th Title | |
| 1993–94 | Henley Hawks | 13–12 | Banbury | Henley Hawks 8th Title | |
| 1994–95 | Henley Hawks | 28–0 | Oxford | Henley Hawks 9th Title | |
| 1995–96 | Bicester | 22–21 | Henley Hawks | Bicester RUFC 1st Title | |
| 1996–97 | Bicester | 22–19 | Banbury | Bicester RUFC 2nd Title | |
| 1997–98 | Banbury | 13–0 | Chinnor | Banbury RUFC 2nd Title | |
| 1998–99 | Chinnor | 8–5 | Banbury | Chinnor RFC 2nd Title | |
| 1999-00 | Banbury | 20–19 | Chinnor | Banbury RUFC 3rd Title | |
2000–10
| 2000–01 | Henley II | 36–9 | Banbury | Henley Hawks 10th Title | |
| 2001–02 | Chinnor | 17–13 | Banbury | Chinnor RFC 3rd Title | |
| 2002–03 | Henley II | 29–19 | Oxford Harlequins | Henley Hawks 11th Title | |
| 2003–04 | Oxford Harlequins | 35–30 | Chinnor | Oxford Harlequins 1st Title | |
| 2004–05 | Henley II | 20–18 | Chinnor | Henley Hawks 12th Title | |
| 2005–06 | Oxford Harlequins | 19–12 | Witney | Oxford Harlequins 2nd Title | |
| 2006–07 | Oxford Harlequins | 36–13 | Witney | Oxford Harlequins 3rd Title | |
| 2007–08 | Oxford Harlequins | 30–20 | Chinnor | Oxford Harlequins 4th Title | |
| 2008–09 | Oxford Harlequins | 57–18 | Banbury | Oxford Harlequins 5th Title | |
| 2009–10 | Chinnor | 68–0 | Witney | Chinnor RFC 4th Title | |
2010–20
| 2010–11 | Chinnor | 19–9 | Oxford Harlequins | Chinnor RFC 5th Title | |
| 2011–12 | Chinnor II | 13–10 | Henley II | Chinnor RFC 6th Title | |
| 2012–13 | Chinnor II | 27–19 | Oxford University Greyhounds | Chinnor RFC 7th Title | |
| 2013–14 | Oxford Harlequins | 21–3 | Banbury | Oxford Harlequins 6th Title | |
| 2014–15 | Grove | 24–22 | Oxford Harlequins | Grove 1st Title | |
| 2015–16 | Banbury | 28–5 | Henley II | Banbury RUFC 4th Title | |
| 2016–17 | Banbury | 17–12 | Oxford University Greyhounds | Banbury RUFC 5th Title | |
| 2017–18 | Banbury | 44–8 | Witney | Banbury RUFC 6th Title | |
| 2018–19 | Banbury | 20–5 | Chinnor | Banbury RUFC 7th Title | |
| 2019–20 | Chinnor | Walkover | Oxford Harlequins | Chinnor RFC 8th Title | |
2020–30
| 2020–21 | COVID-19 | | | | |
| 2021–22 | No Competition | | | | |
| 2022–23 | Oxford Harlequins | 33–15 | Witney | Oxford Harlequins 7th Title | |
| 2023–24 | | | | | |
| 2024–25 | Wallingford RFC | 48-12 | Oxford | Wallingford RFCs 1st Title | Banbury |
| 2025–26 | | | | | |
| 2026–27 | | | | | |
| 2027–28 | | | | | |
| 2028–29 | | | | | |
| 2029–30 | | | | | |

== Winners and runners up ==
| Club | Wins | Runners-up | Winning seasons | Last win |
|---|---|---|---|---|
| Banbury RUFC | 7 | 11 | 1997–98 1999-00 2015–16 2016–17 2017–18 2018–19 | 2018–19 |
| Bicester | 2 | 3 | 1995–96 1996–97 | 1996–97 |
| Chinnor | 8 | 7 | 1976–77 1998–99 2001–02 2009–10 2010–11 2011–12 2012–13 2019–20 | 2019–20 |
| Grove | 1 | 0 | 2014–15 | 2014–15 |
| Henley | 12 | 7 | 1970–71 1978–79 1982–83 1984–85 1990–91 1991–92 1992–93 1993–94 1994–95 2000–01 2002–03 2004–05 | 2004–05 |
| Oxford | 11 | 7 | 1972–73 1974–75 1977–78 1979–80 1980–81 1981–82 1985–86 1986–87 1987–88 1988–89 | 1988–89 |
| Oxford Harlequins | 7 | 4 | 2003–04 2005–06 2006–07 2007–08 2008–09 2013–14 2022–23 | 2022–23 |
| Oxford Marathons | 0 | 2 | N/A | N/A |
| Oxford Old Boys | 3 | 2 | 1971–72 1973–74 1983–84 | 1983–84 |
| Oxford University | 1 | 3 | 1975–76 | 1975–76 |
| Wallingford RFC | 1 | 0 | 2024–25 | 2024–25 |
| Witney | 0 | 5 | N/A | N/A |

- 2020–21 - No Competition due to COVID-19
- 2021–22 - No Competition

== Number of wins ==
- Henley Hawks (12) (Note: Includes 3 wins by the Henley 2nd XV.)
- Oxford (11)
- Chinnor (8) (Note: Includes 2 wins by the Chinnor 2nd XV.) (Note: Includes Walkover win in 2019-20.)
- Banbury (7)
- Oxford Harlequins (7) (Note: Oxford Harlequins have 10 cup wins if you count the 3 titles won by Oxford Old Boys (who would merge with Oxford Marathon to form the Harlequins in 1996).)
- Oxford Old Boys (3)
- Bicester (2)
- Grove (1)
- Oxford University Greyhounds (1)

== See also ==
- Oxfordshire RFU
- Oxfordshire RFU County Shield
- English rugby union system
- Rugby union in England
