= Ollie Allan =

English rugby union player

- Born: 4 February 2004 (age 22)
- Height: 1.87 m (6 ft 1 1/2 in)
- Weight: 90 kg (14 st; 200 lb)
- University: Loughborough University

Rugby union career
- Position: Scrum-half
- Current team: Leicester Tigers
Amateur team(s)
Years	Team	Apps	(Points)
- Hungerford RFC
Senior career
Years	Team	Apps	(Points)
2021–2023	London Irish	2	(0)
2022-2023	→ Rams (loan)		
2023-	Leicester Tigers	21	(10)
- Correct as of 16 November 2026
International career
Years	Team	Apps	(Points)
2024	England U20	5	(5)
- Correct as of 1 October 2024

Ollie Allan (born 4 February 2004) English rugby union footballer who plays at scrum-half for Leicester Tigers.

== Early life ==
He started playing rugby union at the age of four years-old at Hungerford RFC where his brother also played and his father was a coach. He attended St John's School in Marlborough and studied sport science at Loughborough University, where he also played BUCS Super Rugby.

== Club career ==
Initially a fly half and full back he was converted to scrum half whilst in the academy at London Irish. He played on loan at Rams RFC during the 2022-23 season.

Allan was recruited by Leicester Tigers after the liquidation of London Irish in June 2023. He went on to make his Leicester debut off the bench against Bedford Blues in the Premiership Rugby Cup during the 2023-24 season.

== International career ==
He came back from missing the 2024 U20 6 Nations Championships with an injury to play in the England U20 side which won the 2024 World Rugby U20 Championship, making his England U20 debut during the tournament in their opening match against Argentina U20, and scoring a try in the semi final. He was the only player other than captain Finn Carnduff to start all of England's matches in the tournament.

== Honours ==
England U20

- World Rugby Under 20 Championship
  - (gold) Champion (1): 2024
