= Berks/Bucks & Oxon 5 =

English rugby union league

- Sport: Rugby Union
- Instituted: 2011
- Ceased: 2012
- Number of teams: 5
- Country: England
- Website: clubs.rfu.com

Berks, Bucks and Oxon Division 5 was a short lived English rugby union league featuring teams from Berkshire, Buckinghamshire and Oxfordshire. As with all of the divisions in this area at this level, the entire league was made up of second, third and fourth teams of clubs whose first teams play at a higher level of the rugby union pyramid.

== Berks/Bucks & Oxon 5 Honours ==
Berks/Bucks & Oxon 5 Honours
| Season | No of Teams | Champions | Runners–up | Relegated Teams | League Name |
| 2011-12 | 5 | Reading IV (Note: Promoted to Berks/Bucks & Oxon 4.) | Bracknell IV (Note: Promoted to Berks/Bucks & Oxon 3 South due to league restructured caused by folding of Berks/Bucks & Oxon 5.) | No relegation | Berks/Bucks & Oxon 5 (Note: Berks/Bucks & Oxon 5 would fold by the end of the season. Most teams would be moved up to Berks/Bucks & Oxon 4 for the following season.) |
Green backgrounds are promotion places.

== See also ==
- English Rugby Union Leagues
- English rugby union system
- Rugby union in England
