= Chiltern Hills Academy =

Secondary school in Buckinghamshire, England

Location
- Chartridge Lane; Chesham, Buckinghamshire, HP5 2RG; England
- 51°42′33″N 0°37′21″W

Information
- Type: Academy
- Motto: Create. Aspire. Excel
- Established: 2011
- Specialists: Design & Performing Arts
- Department for Education URN: 137280 Tables
- Ofsted: Reports
- Principal: Tim Dobbs
- Gender: Coeducational
- Age: 11 to 18
- Enrolment: 851
- Website: www.chilternhillsacademy.co.uk

Chiltern Hills Academy is a co-educational Academy School in Chesham, Buckinghamshire. It is a Church Of England school, which takes children from the age of 11 through to the age of 18. The school has approximately 700 students. It has Design Academy Specialist school status.

== History ==
Chesham Park School was formed in 1988 by merging the Cestreham Boys’ School and the Lowndes Girls’ School. It was renamed Chesham Park Community College in 1993. In 2004 the Department for Education and Skills (DfES) awarded the school specialist school status as an Arts College, specialising in the Performing Arts.

In 2007 the school won three awards at a UK Rock Challenge competition at St Albans.

The school hosts an offshoot of Chickenshed known as "Shed@ThePark".

In 2011 the school's name was changed to Chiltern Hills Academy. The specialist status of Performing Arts has been combined with Design. These specialist subjects are used to support a creative and enriched curriculum.

== School performance ==
In 2015, 51% of pupils achieved five or more A* to C grades including English and Mathematics at GCSE level. At A-Level and AS-Level, students attain an average 575 points. These results reflect Buckinghamshire's selective education policy, as the school shares its catchment area with three grammar schools, Chesham Grammar School, Dr. Challoner's Grammar School and Dr. Challoner's High School.

== Academy status ==
The school gained approval to convert to reopen as an Academy in August 2011. The Academy, is sponsored by the Diocese of Oxford, Buckinghamshire County Council, Amersham and Wycombe College, Buckinghamshire New University, Pinewood Studios, and the George Abbot Specialist Visual Arts College in Guildford, Surrey.
