= Bicester RUFC =

English rugby union club, based in Oxfordshire

Bicester Rugby Union Club
- Union: Oxfordshire RFU
- Nickname: Foxes
- Founded: 1948; 78 years ago
- Location: Bicester, Oxfordshire, England
- Ground: Oxford Road
- Chairman: (England) Paul Jaggers
- Coach: (England) Dave Rees aka Deece
- League: Counties 1 Southern North
- 2024–25: 10h
Team kit

Official website
- bicesterrufc.rfu.club

Bicester Rugby Union Football Club is an English rugby union club situated in Bicester, 10 miles north of Oxford.

The club provides rugby for children from the age of 4 (under-5s, or school reception year) up to the under-18 (colts), two girls teams, and a senior section which includes the women's team (Vixens), Bicester men's 2nd XV, and 1st XV.

Bicester 1st XV participates in Counties 1 Southern North following their relegation from South West 1 East at the end of the 2017–18 season. Bicester's U13s+ youth age grades and seniors currently play at Whitelands Farm Sports Ground, whilst the minis (up to under-12s) are located at the Bicester Sports Association (BSA) Ground on Akeman Street, Chesterton..

In February 2020, the club was named national KidsFirst Champions by the Rugby Football Union in recognition of its focus on providing a positive development environment for mini-youth rugby.

Bicester RUFC had played at the Oxford Road sports ground from the club's inception in 1948, until 2020. The ground, which was owned by the BSA, was sold to Bicester Village. Plans to expand the BSA site at Chesterton were refused by Cherwell District Council after concerns raised by Oxfordshire County Council Highways Department on transport and accessibility of the site.

== Honours ==
1st team:

- Bucks & Oxon 2 champions: 1990–91
- Berks/Bucks & Oxon 1 champions (2): 1991–92, (Note: 1991–92 title was when league was known as Bucks/Oxon 1.) 2001–02
- Oxfordshire RFU County Cup winners (2): 1996, 1997
- Southern Counties (north v south) promotion playoff winners: 2016–17

2nd team:

- Berks/Bucks & Oxon 2 North champions: 2007–08
- Berks/Bucks & Oxon 1 North champions: 2008–09
- Berks/Bucks & Oxon 3 champions (2): 2011–12, 2016–17

== Notable players ==
- Andy Gomarsall – England International
- James Forrester – England International
- Haydn Morgan – Wales International, British & Irish Lions
- Jon Goodridge
- Kyle Barrett - cousin of Beauden, Kane, Blake, and Jordie Barrett. Samoa sevens International
