= Princes Risborough School =

- School Shield

Location
- Merton Road; Princes Risborough, Buckinghamshire, HP27 0DT; England; 51°43′10″N 0°49′43″W

Information
- Type: Academy
- Motto: Aspire And Achieve
- Established: 1957
- Department for Education URN: 146377 Tables
- Ofsted: Reports
- Head: Vincent Forshaw
- Age: 11 to 18
- Enrollment: 920
- Houses: Chequers, Chilterns, Icknield, Pyrtle Springs, Ridgeway & Whiteleaf
- Colours: Green and Black
- Website: www.princesrisborough.bucks.sch.uk

Princes Risborough School is a co-educational secondary school in Princes Risborough, Buckinghamshire. It accepts children from the age of 11 through to the age of 18 and has approximately 925 pupils.

== History ==
Previously students had completed their secondary education at the nearby Bell Street School (its location was at the bottom of the same hill)

After the War, as part of Princes Risborough's employment and population growth, the town needed a modern secondary school to withstand the number of new pupils moving into the area at the time.

Known affectionately as the 'Top School'. Princes Risborough County Secondary School opened on 6 December 1957 at the end of Merton Road, as a modern complex for new students. This was to revolutionize schooling in Princes Risborough as this new school had proper separate learning blocks where children could move room each lesson and the fact it was of a bigger size than the Bell Street School made it all the better.

In September 2001 the school was awarded specialist school status as a Technology College, by the Department for Education and Skills (DfES).

The school became an Academy in September 2011 and while its motto was 'Enjoy and Achieve', it changed to 'Aspire and Achieve' around 2018.

It has since had a new Sports Hall built in 2014 and the Learning Resource Centre/6th Form has moved and refurbished into the old sports complex.

Simon Baker has been the Headteacher since September 2019.

== Houses ==
Chiltern: Named after the whole location the school and the town lie at the foot of. The colour for this house is Green which defines the natural, beautiful hills that lie within the Chilterns.

Chequers: Named after Chequers, The Prime Minister's country house in Buckinghamshire. The colour for this house is Red.

Icknield: One of the oldest Roman tracks in the country, that naturally passes the school itself and separates the school from its large flat Playing Field (known commonly as the 'Top field'). The colour for this house is Yellow.

Ridgeway: Sometimes confused with the Icknield Way as mentioned above. While The Ridgeway too is an ancient trackway it goes to the ridge of the Downs, while the Icknield Way is parallel lowland route above the spring line at the northern edge of the chalk. The colour for this house is Pink.

Whiteleaf: As the town's most well-known Landmark Whiteleaf Cross stands above the entire town of Princes Risborough and can be seen much further away almost toward Bledlow. It is a great monument that the town cherishes and for the school itself the colour of the house is Blue.

Pyrtle Spring: While some sources claim Pyrtle Spring as Risborough's main water source before the 14th century. It is now a natural, beautiful spring that people can visit for public enjoyment, if you happen to be walking along the Icknield Way, Pyrtle Spring lies just next door. The colour for this house in the school is Purple.

== School Shield ==
When the school opened in December 1957, the logo was simple sketch of the Whiteleaf Cross. There is no specific year when the shield was created and used for the first time but particular symbols on the Shield represent local facts about Princes Risborough.

Knight's Black Helmet: The helmet represents, The Black Prince. Risborough's most notable lord of the manor. Son of King Edward III of England, his name was also Edward and as the eldest son to the King he was heir to the English throne. He died in 1376, only a year before his father.

White Swan: The White Swan with the chain attached to the crown represents the Wycombe District upon which the town of Princes Risborough lies within. The Swan is also the crest on the ceremonial flag and coat of arms of Buckinghamshire, giving it a strong symbol throughout the county.

Whiteleaf Cross: Originally the schools foremost logo upon opening in 1957, Whiteleaf Cross is a chalk cross carved into the hillside that towers above the town.

Market House: Known for its unique architecture and representing the centre of Risborough's market status, the Market House, like the cross is another local landmark located in the town itself.

== Notable Former Pupils ==
- Nigel Harrison, bassist for American rock band, Blondie
