= Oxford R.F.C. =

English rugby union club, based in Oxford

(England) Oxford
- Full name: Oxford Rugby Football Club
- Union: Oxfordshire RFU
- Founded: 1909; 117 years ago
- Location: Oxford, Oxfordshire, England
- Ground(s): North Hinksey Park, North Hinksey Village
- Chairman: John Brodley
- President: Martin Walsh
- Coach(es): Dominic Matthews and Tom Wells
- Captain: Ben Reed 1st XV
- League: Counties 2 Berks/Bucks & Oxon
- 2024–25: 1st (promoted to Counties 1 Southern North)
Team kit

Official website
- oxfordrfc.rfu.club

Oxford Rugby Football Club is a rugby union club based in Oxford. The club was founded in 1909 as "Oxfordshire Nomads RUFC".

== History ==
The club was established in 1909 as "Oxfordshire Nomads RUFC". The club wound up in 1919 after eighteen members were killed in World War I, but Oxfordshire recovered and were reformed two years later. The club changed to "Oxford RFC" after a merger in 1948, and moved to Southern Bypass, in 1951.

During the seventies the club were known as Oxford City RFC and competed in the 1971–72 John Player Cup which today is known as the Anglo-Welsh Cup. Their most famous player was arguably Michael James Parsons known as Jim Parsons who was capped by England four times in the 1968 Five Nations Championship, after joining Northampton Saints. In the 1988–89 Pilkington Cup they did well to progress to the third round but were then drawn away to four time winners and England's leading club at the time Bath, which resulted in an 82–9 hammering.

== Current situation ==
The club runs two senior teams and a colts. The 1st XV currently play in the Counties 1 Southern North which is a level 7 league in the RFU league pyramid. The 1st XV was relegated from BBO Premiership in the 2019–2020 season, Oxford 1st XV competed in Tribute BBO 2 North level 9 in the 2021–22 season which is now known as Counties 3 Tribute Berks, Bucks & Oxon North. In the 2021–22 season, Oxford RFC 1stXV became champions beating local rivals Faringdon RUFC winning 17 out of 18. The RFU changed league structure in the 2022–23 season which meant following promotion we were put in Counties 2 Tribute Berks, Bucks & Oxon North (Formerly BBO Premiership). We unfortunately lost out on promotion to Oxford Quins 2nd XV in the 2022–23 season where we finished 2nd out of twelve teams, and again we finished 2nd out of twelve teams being pipped to promotion by High Wycombe in the 2023–24 Season.

Oxford RFC 1st XV regularly play against many other local 2nd and 3rd XV's as part of their league season (2023–24 season including Banbury RFC 2nd XV, Tring RFC 2nd XV, Oxford Quins 3rd XV, Witney 2nd XV). They play their home games at North Hinksey Park in North Hinksey village. The club colours are green, black & silver hoops.

== Honors ==
- Oxfordshire RFU County Cup winners (11): 1971, 1973, 1975, 1978, 1980, 1981, 1982, 1986, 1987, 1988, 1989
- (Oxfordshire RFU County Shield) Winners (2) 2002–03, 2022–23
- Bucks/Oxon 1 champions: 2000–01
- Southern Counties Cup Winners 2017–18
- Berks/Bucks & Oxon 2 North Champions: 2021–22
