= Hungerford RFC =

Rugby union club in Berkshire, England

(England) Hungerford RFC
- Full name: Hungerford Rugby Football Club
- Union: Berkshire RFU
- Location: Hungerford, Berkshire, England
- Ground(s): Triangle Field, Priory Road
- League: Counties 2 Berks/Bucks & Oxon

Official website
- hungerfordrfc.rfu.club

Hungerford Rugby Football Club is an English rugby union club based in Hungerford, Berkshire. The 1st XV plays in the Counties 2 Tribute Ale Berks/Bucks & Oxon West league, part of the English rugby union system in the South West Division. The 2nd XV competes in Counties 4 Tribute Ale Berks/Bucks & Oxon South.

== History ==
A first incarnation of the club formed in 1929 and played until 1939. The modern club was re-formed in 1984, initially as a Sunday side playing on Hungerford Common. The club joined the Courage League structure in 1987–88 and has since competed in regional Berks/Bucks & Oxon or Dorset & Wilts leagues.

Hungerford moved to Triangle Field, Priory Road, after a long-running project to secure a permanent home; the clubhouse was completed in 2008. The Town Council acquired Triangle Field freehold from West Berkshire Council in 2015 and lists Hungerford RFC as the main user. Two new changing rooms were officially opened at the clubhouse on 23 April 2015.

== Ground ==
The club plays at Triangle Field, Priory Road, Hungerford (RG17 0HR). Public council documents describe the site and facilities, including multiple rugby pitches and four changing rooms.

== Teams ==
The club runs senior men’s sides and a large minis and juniors section (mixed and girls), together with touch and walking rugby sessions.

- 1st XV: Counties 2 Tribute Ale Berks/Bucks & Oxon West (South West Division).
- 2nd XV (Hungerford Lions): Counties 4 Tribute Ale Berks/Bucks & Oxon South.

== Community ==
Hungerford RFC hosts development events for girls’ rugby and, in October 2024, staged Berkshire’s largest “Pitch Up and Play” day with 150 players from regional clubs. In June 2025 club members completed a 57-mile charity walk to raise funds for cancer charities supporting an ex player who was diagnosed with Sarcoma. The club and its volunteers were invited by the RFU to carry flags at Twickenham before England v Australia in November 2024, in recognition of youth and community work. In March 2025 the club ran sessions with pupils from Oaklands School to help children with special educational needs and disabilities learn life skills through rugby.

Club volunteers and juniors have also supported kit recycling through SOS Kit Aid, with a large donation day in February 2022.

== Notable former players ==
- Carys Cox — Wales international; started playing mini rugby at Hungerford.

- Ollie Allan — England U20 scrum-half and Leicester Tigers player; a Hungerford junior.

== Notes ==
Early club activity (1929–1939), the 1984 re-formation and move to Triangle Field are recorded in the club’s history page and local sources.
