= Banbury RUFC =

English rugby union football club based in Bodicote, Oxfordshire

- Full name: Banbury Rugby Union Football Club
- Union: Oxfordshire RFU
- Nickname: The Bulls
- Founded: 1925; 101 years ago
- Location: Banbury, England
- Region: Oxfordshire
- Ground: The Graf UK Stadium (Bodicote Park) (Capacity: 2,500 (250 seats))
- Chairman: (England) John Colegrave
- President: (England) Jamie Briggs
- Coach: (Tonga) Soane Tongaʻuiha
- Captain: (England) Jacob Turner
- League: Regional 1 Midlands
- 2025–26: 8th
Team kit

Official website
- www.banburyrufc.com

Banbury Rugby Football Club is an English rugby union football club based in Bodicote, near Banbury in Oxfordshire. The club currently participate in the fifth tier of English club rugby, Regional 1 Midlands following their sideways transfer from Regional 1 South West. The club run seven senior sides, and a full range of junior sides from aged 5 upwards.

The club has achieved notable success in the Oxfordshire RFU County Cup, winning on seven occasions, including four times in a row in the late 2010s, as well as being runner-up on eleven occasions.

== Ground ==
Banbury play their home games at Bodicote Park (The Graf UK Stadium), in Bodicote which is a village approximately 2 miles (3 km) south of the centre of Banbury. The ground capacity is 2,500, with 250 seats.

== Honours ==
=== Men's 1st XV ===
- Midlands 2 champions: 1996–97
- Midlands 2 East (South) champions: 2009–10
- Midlands 2 West (South) champions: 2015–16
- Oxfordshire RFU County Cup winners (7): 1989–90, 1997–98, 1999–2000, 2015–16, 2016–17, 2017–18, 2018–19

=== Men's 2nd XV ===
- Midlands 3 East (South) champions: 2008–09
- Midlands 2 East (South) champions: 2009–10
- Midlands 2 West (South) champions: 2015–16
- Oxfordshire RFU County Shield champions: 2024-25
- Counties 2 Tribute Ale Berks/Bucks & Oxon West champions: 2025-26

=== Men's 3rd XV ===
- Berks/Bucks & Oxon 2 (North) champions: 2006–07
- Berks/Bucks & Oxon 4 champions: 2011–12
- Wadworth Berks/Bucks & Oxon 2 (North) champions: 2019–20

=== Men's Vets (Old Nicks) ===
- Oxfordshire RFU Vets County Cup champions: 2024-25

== Men's 1st XV previous seasons ==
=== 1999–2000 ===
Season	League	Position	Number of teams	Tier
1998–99	Midlands 1	4th	17	5
1999–00	Midlands 1	6th	17	5

=== 2001–2010 ===
Season	League	Position	Number of teams	Tier
2000–01	Midlands 1	8th	12	5
2001–02	Midlands 1	12th	12	5
2002–03	Midlands 2 East	7th	12	6
2003–04	Midlands 2 East	11th	12	6
2004–05	Midlands 3 East (South)	6th	12	7
2005–06	Midlands 3 East (South)	2nd	12	7
2006–07	Midlands 3 East (South)	2nd	12	7
2007–08	Midlands 2 East	11th	12	6
2008–09	Midlands 3 East (South)	5th	12	7
2009–10	Midlands 2 East (South)	1st	12	6

=== 2011–2020 ===
Season	League	Position	Number of teams	Tier
2010–11	Midlands 1 West	13th	14	6
2011–12	Midlands 2 West (South)	10th	12	7
2012–13	Midlands 2 West (South)	9th	12	7
2013–14	Midlands 2 West (South)	2nd	12	7
2014–15	Midlands 2 West (South)	3rd	12	7
2015–16	Midlands 2 West (South)	1st	12	7
2016–17	South West 1 East	6th	14	6
2017–18	Wadworth 6X South West 1 East	2nd	14	6
2018–19	Wadworth 6X South West 1 East	3rd	14	6
2019–20	Wadworth 6X South West 1 East	3rd	14	6

=== 2021– ===
Season	League	Position	Number of teams	Tier
2020–21	COVID-19			
2021–22	Tribute South West 1 East	2nd	14	6
2022–23	Regional 1 South Central	10th	12	5
2023–24	Regional 1 Midlands	8th	12	5
2024–25	Regional 1 Midlands	7th	12	5
2025–26	Regional 1 Midlands	8th	12	5
2026–27	Regional 1 Midlands			5
