= 2026–27 National League 1 =

Rugby union competition in England

- Countries: England
- Date: 5 September 2026 – April 2027
- Matches played: 42

The 2026–27 National League 1 is the 39th season of the third tier of the English domestic rugby union competitions.

== Structure ==
The league consists of fourteen teams, with all the teams playing each other on a home and away basis, to make a total of twenty-six matches each. From the 2025–26 season there is one automatic promotion place, with the champions going up to Champ Rugby, while clubs ranked 2nd and 3rd contest the National League 1 play-off (the 2nd ranked team having home advantage), with the winner going on to play the 13th placed Champ Rugby side for a possible second promotion place. Clubs finishing 12th, 13th and 14th are automatically relegated to either, National League 2 East, National League 2 North or National League 2 West, depending on the geographical location of the team. The 11th placed side enters a four team play-off with the runner-up of the three tier 4 leagues, with one side going up or remaining in National League 1.

The results of the matches contribute points to the league as follows:

- 4 points are awarded for a win
- 2 points are awarded for a draw
- 0 points are awarded for a loss, however
- 1 losing (bonus) point is awarded to a team that loses a match by 7 points or fewer
- 1 additional (bonus) point is awarded to a team scoring 4 tries or more in a match.

== Participating teams and locations ==
2026–27 National 1 teams in England
2026–27 Greater London National League 1 clubs

Team	Ground	Capacity	City/Area	Previous season
Birmingham Moseley	Billesley Common	5,000 (1,300 seats)	Birmingham, West Midlands	11th
Bishop's Stortford	Silver Leys	1,600	Bishop's Stortford, Hertfordshire	6th
Bury St Edmunds	The Haberden	3,000 (135 seats)	Bury St Edmunds, Suffolk	Promoted from National 2 East (1st)
Cambridge	Grantchester Road	2,200 (200 seats)	Cambridge, Cambridgeshire	Relegated from Champ Rugby (14th)
Camborne	Recreation Ground	7,000 (780 seats)	Camborne, Cornwall	Promoted from National 2 West (1st)
Dings Crusaders	Shaftesbury Park	2,250 (250 seats)	Frenchay, Bristol	10th
Leeds Tykes	The Sycamores (Note: Leeds Tykes will also play one home game at the 19,700 capacity Headingley Stadium in Leeds.)	1,500	Bramhope, Leeds, West Yorkshire	9th
London Scottish	Athletic Ground	4,500 (1,000 seats)	Richmond, London	Relegated from Champ Rugby (13th)
Plymouth Albion	The Brickfields	8,500	Plymouth, Devon	3rd
Rams	Old Bath Road	2,000 (300 seats)	Sonning, Reading, Berkshire	7th
Rosslyn Park	The Rock	2,000 (630 seats)	Roehampton, London	4th
Sale FC	Heywood Road	3,387	Sale, Greater Manchester	5th
Sheffield	Abbeydale Park	3,300 (100 seats)	Sheffield, South Yorkshire	Promoted from National 2 North (1st)
Tonbridge Juddians	The Slade (Note: Tonbridge Juddians occasionally play home games at their 4G training pitch at Vizard (owned by The Judd School) in the event of flooding at their regular ground The Slade.)	1,500	Tonbridge, Kent	8th

== League table ==
2026–27 National League 1 table
Pos	Team	Pld	W	D	L	PF	PA	PD	TB	LB	Pts	Qualification
1	Plymouth Albion	10	10	0	0	537	168	+369	10	0	50	Promotion place
2	Tonbridge Juddians	10	8	0	2	394	347	+47	10	1	43	Promotion play-off
3	Camborne	10	8	0	2	409	307	+102	9	1	42	Promotion play-off
4	Leeds Tykes	10	7	0	3	369	277	+92	8	3	39	
5	Sale FC	10	7	0	3	427	286	+141	8	2	38	
6	Rosslyn Park	10	6	0	4	374	313	+61	9	1	34	
7	London Scottish	10	5	0	5	373	375	−2	8	2	30	
8	Bishop's Stortford	10	4	0	6	369	395	−26	9	2	27	
9	Birmingham Moseley	10	4	0	6	266	378	−112	6	1	23	
10	Rams	10	3	1	6	264	335	−71	7	2	23	
11	Dings Crusaders	10	2	1	7	362	436	−74	9	3	22	Relegation play-off
12	Bury St Edmunds	10	3	0	7	275	399	−124	7	1	20	Relegation place
13	Sheffield	10	2	0	8	261	381	−120	7	3	18	Relegation place
14	Cambridge	10	0	0	10	262	545	−283	6	3	9	Relegation place

Updated to match(es) played on 7 November 2026. Source: National League Rugby
Rules for classification: If teams are level at any stage, tiebreakers are applied in the following order:
1. Number of matches won
2. Number of matches drawn
3. Difference between points for and against
4. Total number of points for
5. Aggregate number of points scored in matches between tied teams
6. Number of matches won excluding the first match, then the second and so on until the tie is settled

== Fixtures & results ==
=== Round 1 ===
5 September 2026
14:00

(1 BP) Leeds Tykes	36 – 38	Camborne (1 BP)
Try: Worthington 10' m, 39' m Laughton 16' c, 21' c Venables 19' m Walker 70' c Con: Ford (3/6) 17', 22', 71'	Report	Try: Priddey 5' c, 34' c Josh Matavesi 44' c Prisk 57' c Ducker 60' c Con: Honey (3/3) 6', 35', 45'; O'Kane (2/2) 57', 60'; Pen: O'Kane (1/1) 74'

The Sycamores
Referee: Samuel Yates

5 September 2026
15:00

(1 BP) Birmingham Moseley	38 – 33	Cambridge (2 BP)
Try: Creed 18' c, 25' c Condliffe 28' m Penalty Try 62'; Con: Read (2/3) 19', 26'; Pen: Read (4/5) 3', 6', 51', 75'	Report	Try: Wood 10' c, 16' c Thorne 53' c Alexander 70' c Gibson 79' m Con: Bouchier (4/5) 11', 16', 54', 71'

Billesley Common
Referee: Callum Watson

5 September 2026
15:00

(1 BP) Bishop's Stortford	52 – 42	Dings Crusaders (1 BP)
Try: Osborn 4' m, Rayment 13' c Apperley 20' c Mills 22' c, 77' c Morris 31' c Kiff 43' m Hitchcock 54' c Con: Cole (6/8) 14', 21', 23', 32', 55', 78'	Report	Try: O'Brien-Taufa 9' c, 79' c Beer 29' c Rowson 34' c O'Grady 41' c Jones 56' c Con: Berry (6/6) 10', 30', 35', 42', 57', 80'

Silver Leys
Referee: Jack Sargentina

5 September 2026
15:00

(1 BP) Bury St Edmunds	27 – 53	London Scottish (1 BP)
Try: Loose 3' m, 27' m Andrews 34' m, 43' c Andrew 74' m Con: Penfold (1/5) 44'	Report	Try: Moyse 11' m Clayton 17' c 24' m Earnshaw 45' c, 48' , 64' m, 68' m Matthew Wilkinson 52' c Wilstead 76' c Con: Wilstead (4/9) 18', 46', 53', 77'

The Haberden
Referee: Ben Rayner

5 September 2026
15:00

(1 BP) Rams	22 – 50	Sale FC (1 BP)
Try: Clow 28' c Ireland 49' m, 61'; Stirling 54' m Con: McKay (1/4) 29'	Report	Try: Dixon 4' m Green 21' c, 42' m, 79' c Walsh 35' m Thunder 38' c Reader 46' c Vickers 66' c Con: Mitchell (5/8) 22', 39', 47', 67', 80'

Old Bath Road
Referee: Holly Wood

5 September 2026
15:00

Rosslyn Park	17 – 61	Plymouth Albion (1 BP)
Try: Coe 16' m Hosking 63' c Vaughan 76' m Con: Smith (1/3) 64'	Report	Try: Wilkinson 5' c, 10 c',42' m Moa 27' c, 47' c Hill 30' c Fenton 38' c Daly 59' c Stewart 66' c Con: Jenkins (8/9) 6', 11', 28', 31', 39', 48', 60', 67'

The Rock
Referee: Owen Taylor

5 September 2026
15:00

(1 BP) Tonbridge Juddians	31 – 26	Sheffield (2 BP)
Try: Lloyd 15' c Walsh 24' m, 48 c' Sims 32' c Mannix 36' m Con: Lloyd (3/5) 16', 32', 49'	Report	Try: Henshall 8' m Hooper 19' c Smith 56' c Archer 74' c Con: Posa (3/4) 20', 57', 75'; Pen: Posa (0/1)

The Slade
Referee: Alan Chandrachud

=== Round 2 ===
12 September 2026
14:30

Sale FC	66 – 35	Birmingham Moseley
Try: Opoku-Fordjour 13' c, 18' c Dixon 22' c Brown 29' c Green 32' c Roberts 49' m Walsh 56' m, 78' c Lamb 67' c, 75' c Con: Mitchell (8/10) 14', 19', 23', 30', 33', 68', 76', 79'	Report	Try: Priest 9' c Smith 40' c Safe 45' c Pogson 59' c Yallop 62' c Con: Read (5/5) 10', 41', 46', 60', 63'

Heywood Road
Referee: Samuel Yates

12 September 2026
15:00

Bishop's Stortford	30 – 61	Rosslyn Park
Try: Hitchcock 47' c Mills 52' m, 60' m Osborn 64' c Con: Cole (1/1) 48'; Hayes (1/3) 65'; Pen: Cole (2/2) 5', 13'	Report	Try: Fenley 6' c Mehson 15' c, 17' c, 67' m Davies 23' c Smith 30' c Cordy-Redden 34' c Hosking 70' c, 79' c Con: Smith (8/9) 7', 16', 18', 24', 31', 35', 72', 80'

Silver Leys
Referee: George Ounsley

12 September 2026
15:00

Camborne	21 – 32	Plymouth Albion
Try: Priddey 50' c Nicholls 73' c Matavesi 80' c Con: Roberts (3/3) 51', 74', 81'	Report	Try: Doak 11' c Fenton 22' m, 46' m Wilkinson 35' m, 60' c Con: Jenkins (1/3) 12'; Legg (1/2) 61'; Pen: Jenkins (1/1) 5'

Recreation Ground
Referee: Alex Powdrell

12 September 2026
15:00

Cambridge	31 – 38	Bury St Edmunds
Try: Alexander 10' c, 40' m McCay 18' c Warner 35' c Caven 74' m Con: Bouchier (3/4) 11', 19', 36'; Ritson (0/1)	Report	Try: Coetzee 4' c Kharbouch 32' c Rees 57' c Williams 61'; Andrew 66' c Con: Penfold (5/5) 5', 33', 58', 62', 67'; Pen: Penfold (1/1) 39'

Grantchester Road
Referee: Jack Sargentina

12 September 2026
15:00

Dings Crusaders	24 – 24	Rams
Try: Cantwell 9' m Thompson 28' c Sinclair 39' m LLoyd 71' c Con: Sinclair (2/4) 29', 72'	Report	Try: Austin 5' m Clow 24' c Austin 45' m Bicknell 48' c Con: McKay (2/4) 25', 49'

Shaftesbury Park
Referee: -

12 September 2026
15:00

London Scottish	38 – 39	Tonbridge Juddians
Try: Harmen 25' c, 54' c Law 47' m Smith 61' m Beattie 66' c Rigelsford 79' c Con: Yandall (4/6) 26', 54', 67', 80'	Report	Try: Walsh 18' c Brooke 32' c Walsh 42' m 63' c Morton-Smith 74' c Con: Lloyd (3/4) 19', 33', 75'; James (1/1) 64'; Pen: Lloyd (1/1) 35'; James (1/1) 70'

Athletic Ground
Referee: Owen Taylor

12 September 2026
15:00

Sheffield	19 – 12	Leeds Tykes
Try: Livingstone 16' m Archer 27' c Hooper 53' c Con: Posa (2/3) 28', 54'	Report	Try: Worthington 19' m Hamilton 78' c Con: Turagabeci (1/2) 79'

Abbeydale Park
Referee: -

=== Round 3 ===
19 September 2026
14:00

(1 BP) Leeds Tykes	57 – 10	London Scottish

The Sycamores

19 September 2026
15:00

(1 BP) Birmingham Moseley	35 – 31	Dings Crusaders (2 BP)

Billesley Common
Attendance: 520

19 September 2026
15:00

Bury St Edmunds	15 – 45	Sale FC (1 BP)

The Haberden
Attendance: 623

19 September 2026
15:00

(1 BP) Plymouth Albion	47 – 5	Sheffield

Brickfields
Attendance: 2319

19 September 2026
15:00

(2 BP) Rams	31 – 34	Bishop's Stortford (1 BP)

Old Bath Road
Attendance: 652

19 September 2026
15:00

(2 BP) Rosslyn Park	26 – 40	Camborne (1 BP)

The Rock
Attendance: 569

19 September 2026
15:00

(1 BP) Tonbridge Juddians	53 – 52	Cambridge (2 BP)

The Slade
Attendance: 253

=== Round 4 ===
26 September 2026
14:30

(2 BP) Sale FC	49 – 52	Tonbridge Juddians (1 BP)

Heywood Road
Attendance: 726
Referee: Alex Powdrell

26 September 2026
15:00

(1 BP) Bishop's Stortford	47 – 5	Birmingham Moseley

Silver Leys
Attendance: 612
Referee: Daniel Woods

26 September 2026
15:00

(1 BP) Cambridge	33 – 57	Leeds Tykes (1 BP)

Grantchester Road
Attendance: 826
Referee: Samuel Yates

26 September 2026
15:00

(1 BP) Dings Crusaders	68 – 47	Bury St Edmunds (1 BP)

Shaftesbury Park
Attendance: 462
Referee: Adam Wookey

26 September 2026
15:00

London Scottish	14 – 50	Plymouth Albion (1 BP)

Athletic Ground
Attendance: 884
Referee: George Ounsley

26 September 2026
15:00

(1 BP) Rams	38 – 34	Rosslyn Park (2 BP)

Old Bath Road
Attendance: 642
Referee: Jack Moorhouse

26 September 2026
15:00

(2 BP) Sheffield	24 – 26	Camborne (1 BP)

Abbeydale Park
Attendance: 268
Referee: Owen Taylor

=== Round 5 ===
2 October 2026
14:30

(1 BP) Leeds Tykes	17 – 21	Sale

The Sycamores
Attendance: 862
Referee: George Ounsley

3 October 2026
14:30

(1 BP) Camborne	38 – 26	London Scottish (1 BP)

Recreation Ground
Attendance: 1,235
Referee: Ben Priddey

3 October 2026
15:00

(1 BP) Bury St Edmunds	31 – 21	Bishops Stortford

GK IPA Haberden
Attendance: 679
Referee: Owen Taylor

3 October 2026
15:00

(1 BP) Plymouth Albion	102 – 0	Cambridge

Brickfields
Attendance: 2,323
Referee: Alex Powdrell

3 October 2026
15:00

(1 BP) Rosslyn Park	40 – 24	Sheffield (1 BP)

Priory Lane
Attendance: 750
Referee: Callum Watson

3 October 2026
15:00

(1 BP) Tonbridge Juddians	41 – 38	Dings Crusaders (2 BP)

The Slade
Attendance: 309
Referee: Samuel Yates

3 October 2026
15:00

(1 BP) Birmingham Moseley	35 – 14	Rams

Billesley Common
Attendance: 650
Referee: Ben Rayner

=== Round 6 ===
10 October 2026
14:30

Sale	21 – 31	Plymouth Albion (1 BP)

Heywood Park
Attendance: 787
Referee: Holly Wood

10 October 2026
15:00

Birmingham Moseley	21 – 31	Rosslyn Park (1 BP)

Billesley Common
Attendance: 611
Referee: George Ounsley

10 October 2026
15:00

(2 BP) Bishops Stortford	32 – 36	Tonbridge Juddians (1 BP)

Silver Leys
Attendance: 612
Referee: Ben Raynor

10 October 2026
15:00

(1 BP) Cambridge	26 – 59	Camborne (1 BP)

Eligia Fields
Attendance: 678
Referee: Samuel Yates

10 October 2026
15:00

(2 BP) Dings Crusaders	35 – 40	Leeds Tykes (1 BP)

Shaftsbury Park
Attendance: 323
Referee: Callum Watson

10 October 2026
15:00

(1 BP) London Scottish	64 – 40	Sheffield (1 BP)

Athletic Ground
Attendance: 440
Referee: Jack Sargentina

10 October 2026
15:00

(1 BP) Rams	27 – 7	Bury St Edmunds

Old Bath Road
Attendance: 630
Referee: Jack Moorhouse

=== Round 7 ===
17 October 2026
14:00

(1 BP) Leeds Tykes	36 – 31	Bishops Stortford (2 BP)

The Sycamores
Attendance: 426
Referee: Jack Moorhouse

17 October 2026
14:30

(1 BP) Camborne	33 – 29	Sale (2 BP)

Recreation Ground
Attendance: 1,190
Referee: Alex Powdrell

17 October 2026
15:00

(1 BP) Bury St Edmunds	31 – 26	Birmingham Moseley (2 BP)

GK IPA Haberden
Attendance: 617
Referee: Jack Sargentina

17 October 2026
15:00

(1 BP) Plymouth Albion	59 – 12	Dings Crusaders

Brickfields
Attendance: 2,389
Referee: Adam Wookey

17 October 2026
15:00

(1 BP) Rosslyn Park	26 – 38	London Scottish (1 BP)

Priory Lane
Attendance: 1,003
Referee: Sam Yates

17 October 2026
15:00

(1 BP) Sheffield	33 – 22	Cambridge

Abbeydale Park
Attendance: 262
Referee: Ben Rayner

17 October 2026
15:00

(1 BP) Tonbridge Juddians	49 – 19	Rams

The Slade
Attendance: 247
Referee: Owen Taylor

=== Round 8 ===
31 October 2026
14:00

Cambridge	22 – 47	London Scottish (1 BP)

Ellgia Fields

31 October 2026
14:30

(1 BP) Sale	49 – 19	Sheffield

Heywood Road

31 October 2026
15:00

(1 BP) Birmingham Moseley	35 – 26	Tonbridge Juddians (1 BP)

Billesley Common

31 October 2026
15:00

(1 BP) Bishops Stortford	40 – 54	Plymouth Albion (1 BP)

Silver Leys

31 October 2026
15:00

Bury St Edmunds	14 – 42	Rosslyn Park (1 BP)

GK IPA Haberden

31 October 2026
15:00

(1 BP) Dings Crusaders	38 – 57	Camborne (1 BP)

Shaftesbury Park

31 October 2026
15:00

(2 BP) Rams	33 – 36	Leeds Tykes (1 BP)

Old Bath Road

=== Round 9 ===
7 November 2026
14:00

(1 BP) Camborne	66 – 35	Bishops Stortford (1 BP)

Recreation Ground
Attendance: 1,062
Referee: Jack Sargentina

7 November 2026
14:00

(1 BP) Leeds Tykes	33 – 19	Birmingham Moseley

The Sycamores
Attendance: 357
Referee: Owen Taylor

7 November 2026
14:00

(1 BP) Tonbridge Juddians	41 – 27	Bury St Edmunds (1 BP)

The Slade
Attendance: 326
Referee: George Ounsley

7 November 2026
15:00

(2 BP) London Scottish	40 – 45	Sale (1 BP)

Athletic Ground
Attendance: 322
Referee: Jack Moorhouse

7 November 2026
15:00

(1 BP) Plymouth Albion	35 – 21	Rams

Brickfields
Attendance: 2,511
Referee: Alex Powdrell

7 November 2026
15:00

(1 BP) Rosslyn Park	66 – 21	Cambridge

Priory Lane
Attendance: 848
Referee: Daniel Woods

7 November 2026
15:00

(2 BP) Sheffield	38 – 43	Dings Crusaders (1 BP)

Abbeydale Park
Attendance: 232
Referee: Ben Rayner

=== Round 10 ===
14 November 2026
14:00

(2 BP) Tonbridge Juddians	26 – 31	Rosslyn Park (1 BP)

The Slade
Attendance: 321
Referee: Jack Sargentina

14 November 2026
14:30

(2 BP) Bury St Edmunds	38 – 45	Leeds Tykes (1 BP)

GK IPA Haberden
Attendance: 651
Referee: Alex Powdrell

14 November 2026
14:30

(1 BP) Sale	52 – 22	Cambridge (1 BP)

Heywood Road
Attendance: 703
Referee: Ben Rayner

14 November 2026
15:00

(1 BP) Bishops Stortford	47 – 33	Sheffield (1 BP)

Silver Leys
Attendance: 633
Referee: Adam Wookey

14 November 2026
15:00

(1 BP) Dings Crusaders	31 – 43	London Scottish (1 BP)

Shaftsbury Park
Attendance: 478
Referee: Callum Watson

14 November 2026
15:00

(1 BP) Rams	35 – 31	Camborne (2 BP)

Old Bath Road
Attendance: 720
Referee: George Ounsley

14 November 2026
15:30

Birmingham Moseley	17 – 66	Plymouth Albion (1 BP)

Billesley Common
Attendance: 775
Referee: Samuel Yates

=== Round 11 ===
21 November 2026
14:00

(1 BP) Camborne	39 – 26	Birmingham Moseley (1 BP)

Recreation Ground

21 November 2026
14:00

(1 BP) Cambridge	46 – 36	Dings Crusaders (1 BP)

Elligia Field

21 November 2026
14:00

(1 BP) Leeds Tykes	38 – 47	Tonbridge Juddians (1 BP)

The Sycamores

21 November 2026
15:00

(1 BP) London Scottish	41 – 36	Bishops Stortford (2 BP)

Athletic Ground

21 November 2026
15:00

(1 BP) Plymouth Albion	38 – 5	Bury St Edmunds

Brickfields

21 November 2026
15:00

(1 BP} Sheffield	24 – 40	Rams (1 BP)

Abbeydale Park

21 November 2026
17:00

Rosslyn Park	–	Sale

Priory Lane

== Individual statistics ==
- Updated to 14 November 2026

=== Top points scorers ===
Rank	Player	Team	Points
1	Connor Lloyd	Tonbridge Juddians	144
2	Iwan Jenkins	Plymouth Albion	97
3	Noah Fenton	Plymouth Albion	95
4	James Mitchell	Sale FC	89
5	Fraser Honey	Camborne	84
6	Ben Priddey	Camborne	80
7	Jack Walsh	Tonbridge Juddians	70
7	Matt Salisbury	Leeds Tykes	70
9	Harry Read	Birmingham Moseley	63
10	Benjamin Penfold	Bury St Edmunds	62

=== Top try scorers ===
Rank	Player	Team	Tries
1	Noah Fenton	Plymouth Albion	19
2	Ben Priddey	Camborne	16
3	Jack Walsh	Tonbridge Juddians	14
3	Matt Salisbury	Leeds Tykes	14
5	Sam Matavesi	Camborne	11
6	Connor Lloyd	Tonbridge Juddians	10
7	Sam Daly	Plymouth Albion	9
7	Luke Mehson	Rosslyn Park	9
7	Harry Wilkinson	Plymouth Albion	9
10	Alex Earnshaw	London Scottish	8

== See also ==
- 2026–27 Champ Rugby
- 2026–27 National League 2 East
- 2026–27 National League 2 North
- 2026–27 National League 2 West
