= 2025–26 National League 2 North =

Rugby union competition in England

- Countries: England
- Date: 6 September 2025 – 25 April 2026
- Champions: Sheffield (1st title)
- Runners-up: Tynedale (not promoted)
- Relegated: Hull, Scunthorpe, Rossendale
- Matches played: 182
- Attendance: 71,293 (average 392 per match)
- Highest attendance: 1,725 – Sheffield v Sheffield Tigers, 20 December 2025
- Lowest attendance: 95 – Scunthorpe v Rossendale, 17 January 2026
- Tries scored: 1576 (average 8.7 per match)
- Top point scorer: 291 – Harry Oliver (Macclesfield)
- Top try scorer: 34 – Christian Hooper (Sheffield)

The 2025–26 National League 2 North is the 38th season of the fourth-tier (north) of the English domestic rugby union competitions; one of three at this level. The others are National League 2 East and National League 2 West.

Sheffield finished the season as champions following a resounding 43 – 24 home win against title challengers Macclesfield on 28 March 2026 to go up with four games still to play. Easily the best side in the division, ultimately finishing 15 points clear, it was the South Yorkshire side's first tier 4 title and promotion to level 3 would be the highest level the club had been in since the 1992–93 season. Tynedale would pip Maccesfield for the runners up spot and qualify for the play-offs but lost their home fixture on 9 May 2026 20 – 29 to National League 2 East runners up Oundle to remain in the division for another season.

At the other end of the table Hull were the first side to be relegated following a 19 – 35 defeat at home to Sheffield Tigers on 18 April 2026, condemning them to the drop with one game still to play. Scunthorpe would be the second automatically relegated team on 25 April 2026, a brave losing and try bonus point defeat away to Darlington on the last round of the season not being enough to keep them up, despite having a game in hand still remaining. The final side to be relegated were 12th placed Rossendale on 9 May 2026, losing the National 2 North Accession Final 14 – 21 at home to Harrogate (Regional 1 North East), who would replace them in the division.

For Hull relegation would be a drop to tier 5 for the first time since 2018, while both Scunthorpe and Rossendale would make an instant return to tier 5, with Scunthorpe setting a record of being the most relegated side from the division (having been relegated for the 4th time).

== Structure ==
The league consists of fourteen teams and each plays the others on a home and away basis, to make a total of 26 matches each. The champions are promoted to National League 1 while the runners up go into the four team National 2 playoffs with the runners up from National League 2 East and National League 2 West and the 11th placed side in National League 1.

The bottom two teams are relegated to Regional 1 North East or Regional 1 North West; depending on their location, while the 12th placed side go into the four team Regional 1 playoffs with the 12th placed sides from National 2 North and National 2 West, as well as the Regional 1 playoff winners.

The results of the matches contribute points to the league as follows:

- 4 points are awarded for a win
- 2 points are awarded for a draw
- 0 points are awarded for a loss, however
- 1 losing (bonus) point is awarded to a team that loses a match by 7 points or fewer
- 1 additional (bonus) point is awarded to a team scoring 4 tries or more in a match.

=== Participating teams and locations ===
Team	Ground	Capacity	City/Area	Previous season
Billingham	Greenwood Road	1,500 (100 seats)	Billingham, County Durham	13th (Note: Normally the 13th placed team would be relegated but due to the RFU Championship expanding from 12 to 14 teams ahead of the 2025–26 season Billingham avoided relegation from the 2024–25 National League 2 North by finishing as the best ranked 13th placed side at level 4.)
Darlington Mowden Park	The Darlington Arena	25,500	Darlington, County Durham	Relegated from National League 1 (14th)
Fylde	Woodlands Memorial Ground	7,500 (500 seats)	Lytham St. Annes, Lancashire	4th
Hull	Ferens Ground	1,500 (288 seats)	Kingston upon Hull, East Riding	11th
Hull Ionians	Brantingham Park	1,500 (240 seats)	Brantingham, East Riding	7th
Macclesfield	Priory Park	1,250 (250 seats)	Macclesfield, Cheshire	Level transfer from National League 2 West (11th)
Otley	Cross Green	7,000 (852 seats)	Otley, Leeds, West Yorkshire	10th
Preston Grasshoppers	Lightfoot Green	2,250 (250 seats)	Preston, Lancashire	12th
Rossendale	Marl Pits	1,100 (100 stand)	Rawtenstall, Rossendale, Lancashire	Promoted from Regional 1 North West
Scunthorpe	Heslam Park	1,212 (212 seats)	Scunthorpe, Lincolnshire	Promoted from Regional 1 North East
Sheffield	Abbeydale Park	3,300 (100 seats)	Sheffield, South Yorkshire	2nd
Sheffield Tigers	Dore Moor	1,000	Sheffield, South Yorkshire	8th
Tynedale	Tynedale Park	2,000 (400 seats)	Corbridge, Northumberland	5th
Wharfedale	The Avenue	2,000	Threshfield, North Yorkshire	6th

Locations of the 2025–26 National League 2 North teams

== League table ==
2025–26 National League 2 North table
Pos	Team	Pld	W	D	L	PF	PA	PD	TB	LB	Pts	Qualification
1	Sheffield (P)	26	24	0	2	1041	467	+574	24	1	121	Promotion place
2	Tynedale	26	21	0	5	941	509	+432	19	3	106	Promotion play-off
3	Macclesfield (R)	26	20	0	6	1037	725	+312	21	2	103	
4	Hull Ionians	26	17	1	8	801	592	+209	19	3	92	
5	Darlington Mowden Park	26	15	1	10	878	877	+1	20	2	84	
6	Fylde	26	13	3	10	796	664	+132	16	5	79	
7	Wharfedale	26	13	0	13	725	780	−55	15	6	73	
8	Sheffield Tigers	26	12	0	14	686	611	+75	15	8	71	
9	Preston Grasshoppers	26	10	1	15	776	817	−41	16	3	61	
10	Billingham	26	10	0	16	604	905	−301	16	3	59	
11	Otley	26	7	0	19	673	831	−158	12	8	48	
12	Rossendale (R)	26	7	0	19	633	965	−332	14	4	46	Relegation play-off
13	Scunthorpe (R)	26	5	0	21	622	1097	−475	12	7	39	Relegation place
14	Hull (R)	26	5	0	21	570	943	−373	11	5	36	Relegation place

Updated to match(es) played on 2 May 2026. Source: National League Rugby
Rules for classification: If teams are level at any stage, tiebreakers are applied in the following order:
1. Number of matches won
2. Number of matches drawn
3. Difference between points for and against
4. Total number of points for
5. Aggregate number of points scored in matches between tied teams
6. Number of matches won excluding the first match, then the second and so on until the tie is settled

== Fixtures & results ==
=== Round 1 ===
6 September 2025
14:00

(1 BP) Hull	18 – 22	Rossendale (1 BP)

Ferens Ground
Attendance: 221
Referee: Mark Hyde

6 September 2025
14:30

(1 BP) Preston Grasshoppers	46 – 24	Billingham (1 BP)

Lightfoot Green
Attendance: 339
Referee: Samuel Yates

6 September 2025
15:00

Fylde	22 – 22	Hull Ionians

Woodlands Memorial Ground
Attendance: 486
Referee: Daniel Woods

6 September 2025
15:00

(1 BP) Macclesfield	46 – 26	Sheffield Tigers (1 BP)

Priory Park
Attendance: 345
Referee: Thomas Hurdley

6 September 2025
15:00

(1 BP) Scunthorpe	29 – 63	Darlington Mowden Park (1 BP)

Heslam Park
Attendance: 200
Referee: Gavin Jones

6 September 2025
15:00

(1 BP) Sheffield	48 – 26	Otley (1 BP)

Abbeydale Park
Attendance: 325
Referee: Michael Harris

6 September 2025
15:00

(1 BP) Tynedale	50 – 19	Wharfdale

Tynedale Park
Attendance: 525
Referee: Andrew Ward

=== Round 2 ===
12 September 2025
19:45

(1 BP) Darlington Mowden Park	38 – 48	Tynedale (1 BP)

The Darlington Arena
Attendance: 1,107
Referee: Samuel Yates

13 September 2025
14:15

Billingham	21 – 16	Wharfedale (1 BP)

Greenwood Road
Attendance: 433
Referee: Nikki O'Donnell

13 September 2025
14:30

(1 BP) Preston Grasshoppers	20 – 24	Fylde

Lightfoot Green
Attendance: 1,037
Referee: Thomas Hurdley

13 September 2025
15:00

(1 BP) Hull Ionians	35 – 19	Hull

Brantingham Park
Attendance: 558
Referee: David Charlton

13 September 2025
15:00

(1 BP) Otley	59 – 8	Scunthorpe

Cross Green
Attendance: 276
Referee: Andrew Shaw

13 September 2025
15:00

(1 BP) Rossendale	41 – 53	Macclesfield (1 BP)

Marl Pits
Attendance: 252 (Note: The Rugby Paper gave 2 attendances for Rossendale's home game versus Macclesfield on 13 September 2025 - 252 on the match report and 420 on the results page. The match report figure will be used until further notice.)
Referee: Michael Harris

13 September 2025
15:00

Sheffield Tigers	9 – 29	Sheffield (1 BP)

Dore Moor
Attendance: 843
Referee: Daniel Woods

=== Round 3 ===
20 September 2025
14:00

(1 BP) Hull	3 – 10	Preston Grasshoppers

Ferens Ground
Attendance: 110
Referee: Michael Harris

20 September 2025
14:00

(2 BP) Wharfedale	28 – 31	Darlington Mowden Park (1 BP)

The Avenue
Attendance: 324
Referee: Nathan Howarth

20 September 2025
15:00

(1 BP) Fylde	37 – 11	Billingham

Woodlands Memorial Ground
Attendance: 346
Referee: Gavin Jones

20 September 2025
15:00

(1 BP) Scunthorpe	18 – 19	Sheffield Tigers

Heslam Park
Attendance: 150
Referee: David Charlton

20 September 2025
15:00(1 BP)

(1 BP) Sheffield	45 – 10	Rossendale

Abbeydale Park
Attendance: 274
Referee: Mark Hyde

20 September 2025
15:00

(1 BP) Tynedale	34 – 8	Otley

Tynedale Park
Attendance: 425
Referee: Nikki O'Donnell

20 September 2025
15:15

Macclesfield	31 – 26	Hull Ionians (2 BP)

Priory Park
Attendance: 301
Referee: Samuel Yates

=== Round 4 ===
27 September 2025
14:15

(1 BP) Billingham	26 – 36	Darlington Mowden Park (1 BP)

Greenwood Road
Attendance: 664
Referee: Not recorded (Note: The Rugby Paper listed David Charlton as being the referee for Billingham's home match against Darlington Mowden Park on 27 September 2025. However, as David Charlton was referring the Birmingham Moseley against Dings Crusaders game on the same day this is not possible. Leaving as "Not recorded" until further notice.)

27 September 2025
14:30

(1 BP) Preston Grasshoppers	29 – 42	Macclesfield (1 BP)

Lightfoot Green
Attendance: 252
Referee: Gavin Jones

27 September 2025
15:00

(1 BP) Fylde	40 – 29	Hull (1 BP)

Woodlands Memorial Ground
Attendance: 506
Referee: Thomas Hurdley

27 September 2025
15:00

Hull Ionians	21 – 32	Sheffield (1 BP)

Brantingham Park
Attendance: 140
Referee: Jack Moorhouse

27 September 2025
15:00

(1 BP) Otley	20 – 21	Wharfedale

Cross Green
Attendance: 499
Referee: Michael Harris

27 September 2025
15:00

(1 BP) Rossendale	54 – 29	Scunthorpe (1 BP)

Marl Pits
Attendance: 202
Referee: Daniel Woods

27 September 2025
15:00

Sheffield Tigers	14 – 31	Tynedale (1 BP)

Dore Moor
Attendance: 196
Referee: Matthew Arrowsmith

=== Round 5 ===
4 October 2025
14:00

(1 BP) Hull	33 – 24	Billingham (1 BP)

Ferens Ground
Attendance: 339 (Note: The Rugby Paper gave 2 attendances for Hull's home game versus Macclesfield on 13 September 2025 - 339 on the match report and 250 on the results page. The match report figure will be used until further notice.)
Referee: Gavin Jones

4 October 2025
14:00

(1 BP) Wharfedale	33 – 15	Sheffield Tigers

The Avenue
Attendance: 395
Referee: Peter Connor

4 October 2025
15:00

(1 BP) Darlington Mowden Park	33 – 27	Otley (2 BP)

The Darlington Arena
Attendance: 772
Referee: Nikki O'Donnell

4 October 2025
15:00

(1 BP) Macclesfield	19 – 21	Fylde

Priory Park
Attendance: 223 (Note: The Rugby Paper gave 2 attendances for Macclesfield's home game versus Fylde on 4 October 2025 - 223 on the match report and 201 on the results page. The match report figure will be used until further notice.)
Referee: Max Marshall

4 October 2025
15:00

(1 BP) Scunthorpe	18 – 24	Hull Ionians (1 BP)

Heslam Park
Attendance: 150
Referee: Michael Harris

4 October 2025
15:00

(1 BP) Sheffield	40 – 10	Preston Grasshoppers

Abbeydale Park
Attendance: 255
Referee: Mark Hyde

4 October 2025
15:00

(1 BP) Tynedale	46 – 29	Rossendale (1 BP)

Tynedale Park
Attendance: 525
Referee: David Charlton

=== Round 6 ===
11 October 2025
14:00

(1 BP) Hull	26 – 66	Macclesfield (1 BP)

Ferens Ground
Attendance: 125
Referee: David Charlton

11 October 2025
14:15

(1 BP) Billingham	47 – 42	Otley (2 BP)

Greenwood Road
Attendance: 450
Referee: Daniel Woods

11 October 2025
14:30

(1 BP) Preston Grasshoppers	74 – 7	Scunthorpe

Lightfoot Green
Attendance: 407
Referee: Thomas Hardley

11 October 2025
15:00

Fylde	18 – 40	Sheffield (1 BP)

Woodlands Memorial Ground
Attendance: 487
Referee: Andrew Shaw

11 October 2025
15:00

(1 BP) Hull Ionians	35 – 19	Tynedale

Brantingham Park
Attendance: 244
Referee: Mark Hyde

11 October 2025
15:00

Rossendale	3 – 29	Wharfedale (1 BP)

Marl Pits
Attendance: 350
Referee: Michael Harris

11 October 2025
15:00

(2 BP) Sheffield Tigers	24 – 28	Darlington Mowden Park (1 BP)

Dore Moor
Attendance: 208
Referee: Owen Taylor

=== Round 7 ===
18 October 2025
14:00

(1 BP) Wharfedale	30 – 37	Hull Ionians (1 BP)

The Avenue
Attendance: 520
Referee: Nikki O'Donnell

18 October 2025
15:00

(1 BP) Darlington Mowden Park	56 – 27	Rossendale

The Darlington Arena
Attendance: 875
Referee: Gavin Jones

18 October 2025
15:00

(1 BP) Macclesfield	41 – 19	Billingham

Priory Park
Attendance: 233
Referee: Andrew Shaw

18 October 2025
15:00

(1 BP) Otley	37 – 36	Sheffield Tigers (2 BP)

Cross Green
Attendance: 296
Referee: Michael Harris

18 October 2025
15:00

(1 BP) Scunthorpe	27 – 45	Fylde (1 BP)

Heslam Park
Attendance: 148 (Note: The Rugby Paper gave 2 attendances for Hull's home game versus Macclesfield on 13 September 2025 - 200 on the match report and 148 on the results page. The results figure will be used until further notice as it is more specific.)
Referee: Mark Hyde

18 October 2025
15:00

(1 BP) Sheffield	71 – 27	Hull

Abbeydale Park
Attendance: 425
Referee: Thomas Hurdley

18 October 2025
15:00

(1 BP) Tynedale	25 – 15	Preston Grasshoppers

Tynedale Park
Attendance: 325
Referee: Nathan Howarth

=== Round 8 ===
25 October 2025
14:00

(1 BP) Hull	25 – 27	Scunthorpe

Ferens Ground
Attendance: 210
Referee: Owen Taylor

25 October 2025
14:15

(1 BP) Billingham	35 – 31	Sheffield Tigers (2 BP)

Greenwood Road
Attendance: 388
Referee: Nathan Howarth

25 October 2025
14:30

(1 BP) Preston Grasshoppers	46 – 41	Wharfedale (2 BP)

Lightfoot Green
Attendance: 262
Referee: David Charlton

25 October 2025
15:00

(1 BP) Fylde	19 – 24	Tynedale (1 BP)

Woodlands Memorial Ground
Attendance: 784
Referee: Daniel Woods

25 October 2025
15:00

Hull Ionians	17 – 36	Darlington Mowden Park (1 BP)

Brantingham Park
Attendance: 229
Referee: Thomas Hurdley

25 October 2025
15:00

Macclesfield	25 – 41	Sheffield (1 BP)

Priory Park
Attendance: 272
Referee: Gavin Jones

25 October 2025
15:00

(1 BP) Rossendale	32 – 43	Otley (1 BP)

Marl Pits
Attendance: 225
Referee: Samuel Yates

=== Round 9 ===
8 November 2025
14:00

Otley	22 – 45	Hull Ionians (1 BP)

Cross Green
Attendance: 245
Referee: Samuel Yates

8 November 2025
14:00

Scunthorpe	14 – 66	Macclesfield (1 BP)

Heslam Park
Attendance: 150
Referee: Timothy Allatt

8 November 2025
14:00

(1 BP) Sheffield Tigers	33 – 15	Rossendale

Dore Moor
Attendance: 208
Referee: Michael Harris

8 November 2025
14:00

(1 BP) Tynedale	66 – 26	Hull (1 BP)

Tynedale Park
Attendance: 550
Referee: David Charlton

8 November 2025
14:00

(2 BP) Wharfedale	39 – 43	Fylde (1 BP)

The Avenue
Attendance: 537
Referee: Mark Hyde

8 November 2025
14:15

(1 BP) Sheffield	58 – 7	Billingham

Abbeydale Park
Attendance: 325
Referee: Gavin Jones

8 November 2025
15:00

(1 BP) Darlington Mowden Park	57 – 35	Preston Grasshoppers (1 BP)

The Darlington Arena
Attendance: 635
Referee: Arthur Shaw

=== Round 10 ===
15 November 2025
14:00

Hull	21 – 44	Wharfedale (1 BP)

Ferens Ground
Attendance: 135
Referee: Matthew Arrowsmith

15 November 2025
14:00

(2 BP) Hull Ionians	26 – 27	Sheffield Tigers

Brantingham Park
Attendance: 231
Referee: Gavin Jones

15 November 2025
14:15

(1 BP) Billingham	31 – 27	Rossendale (2 BP)

Greenwood Road
Attendance: 317
Referee: Nikki O'Donnell

15 November 2025
14:30

(1 BP) Preston Grasshoppers	25 – 34	Otley (1 BP)

Lightfoot Green
Attendance: 202
Referee: Michael Harris

15 November 2025
15:00

Sheffield	P – P	Scunthorpe

Abbeydale Park

- Postponed due to waterlogged pitch. Game to be rescheduled for 29 November 2025.

15 November 2025
15:00

Fylde	17 – 17	Darlington Mowden Park

Woodlands Memorial Ground
Attendance: 355
Referee: Daniel Woods

15 November 2025
15:00

(1 BP) Macclesfield	39 – 38	Tynedale (2 BP)

Priory Park
Attendance: 280
Referee: Andrew Shaw

=== Round 11 ===
22 November 2025
14:00

(1 BP) Otley	20 – 24	Fylde

Cross Green
Attendance: 284
Referee: Andrew Shaw

22 November 2025
14:00

Scunthorpe	19 – 27	Billingham (1 BP)

Heslam Park
Attendance: 180
Referee: Mark Hyde

22 November 2025
14:00

(1 BP) Sheffield Tigers	36 – 12	Preston Grasshoppers

Dore Moor
Attendance: 192
Referee: Daniel Woods

22 November 2025
14:00

(1 BP) Tynedale	8 – 14	Sheffield

Tynedale Park
Attendance: 425
Referee: Nathan Howarth

22 November 2025
14:00

Wharfedale	15 – 43	Macclesfield (1 BP)

The Avenue
Attendance: 309
Referee: Owen Taylor

22 November 2025
14:15

Rossendale	0 – 53	Hull Ionians (1 BP)

Marl Pits
Attendance: 350
Referee: Thomas Hurdley

22 November 2025
15:00

Darlington Mowden Park	27 – 24	Hull (1 BP)

The Darlington Arena
Attendance: 524
Referee: Gavin Jones

=== Round 10 (rescheduled) ===
29 November 2025
15:00

Sheffield	P – P	Scunthorpe

Abbeydale Park

- Game rescheduled from 15 November 2025 but postponed for a second time due to waterlogged pitch. Game to be rescheduled for 7 February 2026.

=== Round 12 ===
6 December 2025
14:00

Hull	24 – 18	Otley (1 BP)

Ferens Ground
Attendance: 165
Referee: Mark Hyde

6 December 2025
14:00

Scunthorpe	5 – 47	Tynedale (1 BP)

Heslam Park
Attendance: 191
Referee: Matthew Arrowsmith

6 December 2025
14:15

Billingham	12 – 39	Hull Ionians (1 BP)

Greenwood Road
Attendance: 353
Referee: Andrew Shaw

6 December 2025
14:15

(1 BP) Sheffield	38 – 13	Wharfedale

Abbeydale Park
Attendance: 225
Referee: Michael Harris

6 December 2025
14:30

(1 BP) Preston Grasshoppers	32 – 20	Rossendale

Lightfoot Green
Attendance: 294
Referee: Timothy Allatt

6 December 2025
15:00

(1 BP) Fylde	36 – 12	Sheffield Tigers

Woodlands Memorial Ground
Attendance: 570
Referee: David Charlton

6 December 2025
15:00

(1 BP) Macclesfield	38 – 24	Darlington Mowden Park (1 BP)

Priory Park
Attendance: 212
Referee: Daniel Woods

=== Round 13 ===
13 December 2025
14:00

(1 BP) Hull Ionians	41 – 7	Preston Grasshoppers

Brantingham Park
Attendance: 407
Referee: David Charlton

13 December 2025
14:00

(1 BP) Otley	34 – 55	Macclesfield (1 BP)

Cross Green
Attendance: 317
Referee: Michael Harris

13 December 2025
14:00

Sheffield Tigers	22 – 0	Hull

Dore Moor
Attendance: 159
Referee: Jack Sargentina

13 December 2025
14:00

(1 BP) Tynedale	41 – 0	Billingham

Tynedale Park
Attendance: 253
Referee: Owen Taylor

13 December 2025
14:00

(1 BP) Wharfedale	34 – 28	Scunthorpe (2 BP)

The Avenue
Attendance: 420
Referee: Daniel Woods

13 December 2025
14:15

Rossendale	10 – 57	Fylde (1 BP)

Marl Pits
Attendance: 210
Referee: Matthew Arrowsmith

13 December 2025
15:00

(2 BP) Darlington Mowden Park	28 – 29	Sheffield (1 BP)

The Darlington Arena
Attendance: 685
Referee: Nathan Howarth

=== Round 14 ===
19 December 2025
19:00

(1 BP) Sheffield	26 – 10	Sheffield Tigers

Abbeydale Park
Attendance: 1,725
Referee: Ben Rayner

20 December 2025
14:00

Hull	0 – 29	Hull Ionians (1 BP)

Ferens Ground
Attendance: 535
Referee: Samuel Yates

20 December 2025
14:00

(1 BP) Scunthorpe	29 – 22	Otley (1 BP)

Heslam Park
Attendance: 295
Referee: David Charlton

20 December 2025
14:00

(1 BP) Tynedale	39 – 0	Darlington Mowden Park

Tynedale Park
Attendance: 680
Referee: Michael Harris

20 December 2025
14:00

Wharfedale	25 – 24	Billingham (2 BP)

The Avenue
Attendance: 618
Referee: Thomas Hurdley

20 December 2025
15:00

Fylde	22 – 22	Preston Grasshoppers (1 BP)

Woodlands Memorial Ground
Attendance: 1,394
Referee: Daniel Woods

20 December 2025
15:00

(1 BP) Macclesfield	56 – 0	Rossendale

Priory Park
Attendance: 356
Referee: Peter Connor

=== Round 15 ===
9 January 2026
19:45

Darlington Mowden Park	P – P	Wharfedale

The Darlington Arena

- Postponed due to frozen pitch. Game to be rescheduled for 6 February 2026.

10 January 2026
14:00

Hull Ionians	P – P	Macclesfield

Brantingham Park

- Postponed due to frozen pitch. Game to be rescheduled for 7 February 2026.

10 January 2026
14:00

Otley	P – P	Tynedale

Cross Green

- Postponed due to frozen pitch. Game to be rescheduled for 7 February 2026.

10 January 2026
14:00

Sheffield Tigers	P – P	Scunthorpe

Dore Moor

- Postponed due to frozen pitch. Game to be rescheduled for 7 March 2026.

10 January 2026
14:15

Billingham	P – P	Fylde

Greenwood Road

- Postponed due to frozen pitch. Game to be rescheduled for 7 February 2026.

10 January 2026
14:15

Rossendale	P – P	Sheffield

Marl Pits

- Postponed due to frozen pitch. Game to be rescheduled for 7 March 2026.

10 January 2026
14:30

(1 BP) Preston Grasshoppers	21 – 24	Hull

Lightfoot Green
Attendance: 367
Referee: Michael Harris

=== Round 16 ===
17 January 2026
14:00

(1 BP) Hull	34 – 31	Fylde (2 BP)

Ferens Ground
Attendance: 154
Referee: Michael Harris

17 January 2026
14:00

(1 BP) Scunthorpe	7 – 13	Rossendale

Heslam Park
Attendance: 95
Referee: Andrew Shaw

17 January 2026
14:00

Tynedale	14 – 7	Sheffield Tigers (1 BP)

Tynedale Park
Attendance: 680
Referee: Nathan Howarth

17 January 2026
14:00

(1 BP) Wharfedale	32 – 14	Otley

The Avenue
Attendance: 606
Referee: David Charlton

17 January 2026
15:00

(1 BP) Darlington Mowden Park	45 – 35	Billingham (1 BP)

The Darlington Arena
Attendance: 879
Referee: Daniel Woods

17 January 2026
15:00

(1 BP) Macclesfield	38 – 26	Preston Grasshoppers (1 BP)

Priory Park
Attendance: 243
Referee: Owen Taylor

17 January 2026
15:00

(1 BP) Sheffield	26 – 17	Hull Ionians

Abbeydale Park
Attendance: 375
Referee: Nikki O'Donnell

=== Round 17 ===
24 January 2026
14:00

(1 BP) Hull Ionians	47 – 26	Scunthorpe (1 BP)

Brantingham Park
Attendance: 459
Referee: Michael Harris

24 January 2026
14:00

Otley	33 – 28	Darlington Mowden Park (2 BP)

Cross Green
Attendance: 287
Referee: Mark Hyde

24 January 2026
14:00

Rossendale	17 – 50	Tynedale (1 BP)

Marl Pits
Attendance: 189
Referee: Daniel Woods

24 January 2026
14:00

(1 BP) Sheffield Tigers	29 – 0	Wharfedale

Dore Moor
Attendance: 206
Referee: Thomas Hurley

24 January 2026
14:15

(1 BP) Billingham	35 – 24	Hull (1 BP)

Greenwood Road
Attendance: 342
Referee: Nathan Howarth

24 January 2026
14:30

Preston Grasshoppers	17 – 54	Sheffield (1 BP)

Lightfoot Green
Attendance: 397
Referee: Andrew Shaw

24 January 2026
15:00

(2 BP) Fylde	26 – 27	Macclesfield (1 BP)

Woodlands Memorial Ground
Attendance: 725
Referee: Timothy Allatt

=== Round 18 ===
31 January 2026
14:00

(1 BP) Otley	18 – 19	Billingham

Cross Green
Attendance: 343
Referee: Timothy Allatt

31 January 2026
14:00

Scunthorpe	P – P	Preston Grasshoppers

Heslam Park

- Postponed due to a waterlogged pitch. Game to be rescheduled to 28 March 2026.

31 January 2026
14:00

(1 BP) Tynedale	19 – 21	Hull Ionians

Tynedale Park
Attendance: 680
Referee: Dave Charlton

31 January 2026
14:00

(1 BP) Wharfedale	52 – 17	Rossendale

The Avenue
Attendance: 637
Referee: Andrew Shaw

31 January 2026
15:00

(1 BP) Darlington Mowden Park	27 – 42	Sheffield Tigers (1 BP)

The Darlington Arena
Attendance: 621
Referee: Michael Harris

31 January 2026
15:00

(1 BP) Macclesfield	45 – 19	Hull

Priory Park
Attendance: 180
Referee: Daniel Woods

31 January 2026
15:00

(1 BP) Sheffield	29 – 17	Fylde

Abbeydale Park
Attendance: 311
Referee: Owen Taylor

=== Rounds 10 & 15 (rescheduled games) ===
6 February 2026
19:45

Darlington Mowden Park	24 – 17	Wharfedale (1 BP)

The Darlington Arena
Attendance: 812
Referee: Andrew Shaw

- Game rescheduled from 9 January 2026.

7 February 2026
14:00

(1 BP) Hull Ionians	38 – 7	Macclesfield

Brantingham Park
Attendance: 159
Referee: Timothy Allatt

- Game rescheduled from 10 January 2026.

7 February 2026
14:00

Otley	15 – 23	Tynedale

Cross Green
Attendance: 202
Referee: Nikki O'Donnell

- Game rescheduled from 10 January 2026.

7 February 2026
14:15

(1 BP) Billingham	27 – 24	Fylde (2 BP)

Greenwood Road
Attendance: 355
Referee: Michael Harris

- Game rescheduled from 10 January 2026.

7 February 2026
15:00

Sheffield	P – P	Scunthorpe

Abbeydale Park

- Game rescheduled from 29 November 2025 but postponed for a second time due to waterlogged pitch. Game to be rescheduled for 2 May 2026.

=== Round 19 ===
14 February 2026
14:00

Hull	10 – 24	Sheffield (1 BP)

Ferens Ground
Attendance: 158
Referee: David Charlton

14 February 2026
14:00

(2 BP) Hull Ionians	29 – 31	Wharfedale (1 BP)

Brantingham Park
Attendance: 240
Referee: Tom Hurdley

14 February 2026
14:00

(1 BP) Sheffield Tigers	38 – 0	Otley

Dore Moor
Attendance: 198
Referee: Daniel Woods

14 February 2026
14:15

(1 BP) Billingham	28 – 36	Macclesfield (1 BP)

Greenwood Road
Attendance: 265
Referee: Nikki O'Donnell

14 February 2026
14:15

(1 BP) Rossendale	26 – 54	Darlington Mowden Park (1 BP)

Marl Pits
Attendance: 202
Referee: Timothy Allatt

14 February 2026
14:30

(2 BP) Preston Grasshoppers	37 – 42	Tynedale (1 BP)

Lightfoot Green
Attendance: 387
Referee: Nathan Howarth

14 February 2026
15:00

(2 BP) Fylde	33 – 36	Scunthorpe (1 BP)

Woodlands Memorial Ground
Attendance: 425
Referee: Andrew Shaw

=== Round 20 ===
21 February 2026
14:00

(1 BP) Otley	32 – 26	Rossendale (2 BP)

Cross Green
Attendance: 169
Referee: Tom Hurdley

21 February 2026
14:00

(1 BP) Scunthorpe	41 – 32	Hull (1 BP)

Heslam Park
Attendance: 202
Referee: Daniel Woods

21 February 2026
14:00

(1 BP) Sheffield Tigers	46 – 7	Billingham

Dore Moor
Attendance: 180
Referee: Cameron Livingstone

21 February 2026
14:00

(1 BP) Tynedale	34 – 26	Fylde (1 BP)

Tynedale Park
Attendance: 680
Referee: Nikki O'Donnell

21 February 2026
14:00

(1 BP) Wharfedale	34 – 19	Preston Grasshoppers

The Avenue
Attendance: 411
Referee: Michael Harris

21 February 2026
15:00

Darlington Mowden Park	19 – 31	Hull Ionians (1 BP)

The Darlington Arena
Attendance: 578
Referee: David Charlton

21 February 2026
15:00

Sheffield	P – P	Macclesfield

Abbeydale Park

- Postponed due to waterlogged pitch. Game to be rescheduled to 28 March 2026.

=== Round 21 ===
28 February 2026
14:00

(1 BP) Hull	25 – 35	Tynedale (1 BP)

Ferens Ground
Attendance: 175
Referee: Matthew Arrowsmith

28 February 2026
14:00

(1 BP) Hull Ionians	29 – 27	Otley (1 BP)

Brantingham Park
Attendance: 339
Referee: Max Marshall

28 February 2026
14:15

Billingham	7 – 52	Sheffield (1 BP)

Greenwood Road
Attendance: 393
Referee: Nathan Myers

28 February 2026
14:15

(1 BP) Rossendale	29 – 22	Sheffield Tigers (1 BP)

Marl Pits
Attendance: 198
Referee: Michael Harris

28 February 2026
14:30

(1 BP) Preston Grasshoppers	66 – 26	Darlington Mowden Park (1 BP)

Lightfoot Green
Attendance: 402
Referee: Cameron Livingston

28 February 2026
15:00

(1 BP) Fylde	45 – 7	Wharfedale

Woodlands Memorial Ground
Attendance: 853
Referee: Timothy Allatt

28 February 2026
15:00

(1 BP) Macclesfield	50 – 19	Scunthorpe

Priory Park
Attendance: 334
Referee: William Foster

=== Round 15 (rescheduled games) ===
7 March 2026
14:00

(1 BP) Sheffield Tigers	25 – 21	Scunthorpe (1 BP)

Dore Moor
Attendance: 176
Referee: Matthew Arrowsmith

- Game rescheduled from 10 January 2026.

7 March 2026
15:00

(1 BP) Rossendale	26 – 36	Sheffield (1 BP)

Marl Pits
Attendance: 250
Referee: Peter Connor (Note: The Rugby Paper listed Peter Connor as the referee for Rossendale v Sheffield on 7 March 2026 despite him also being listed as referee for the National League 1 fixture between Birmingham Moseley & Rosslyn Park on the same day.)

- Game rescheduled from 10 January 2026.

=== Round 22 ===
14 March 2026
14:00

(1 BP) Tynedale	36 – 14	Macclesfield

Tynedale Park
Attendance: 580
Referee: Michael Harris

14 March 2026
14:00

(1 BP) Wharfedale	43 – 31	Hull (1 BP)

The Avenue
Attendance: 325
Referee: Thomas Hurdley

14 March 2026
15:00

(1 BP) Darlington Mowden Park	38 – 52	Fylde (1 BP)

The Darlington Arena
Attendance: 551
Referee: David Charlton

14 March 2026
15:00

Otley	11 – 29	Preston Grasshoppers (1 BP)

Cross Green
Attendance: 242
Referee: Nathan Howard

14 March 2026
15:00

(1 BP) Rossendale	29 – 24	Billingham (2 BP)

Marl Pits
Attendance: 250
Referee: Matthew Arrowsmith

14 March 2026
15:00

(1 BP) Scunthorpe	31 – 55	Sheffield (1 BP)

Heslam Park
Attendance: 525
Referee: Max Marshall

14 March 2026
15:00

(1 BP) Sheffield Tigers	23 – 24	Hull Ionians

Dore Moor
Attendance: 204
Referee: Cameron Livingstone

=== Round 23 ===
21 March 2026
14:00

(2 BP) Hull	31 – 36	Darlington Mowden Park (1 BP)

Ferens Ground
Attendance: 227
Referee: Matthew Arrowsmith

21 March 2026
14:15

(1 BP) Billingham	31 – 17	Scunthorpe

Greenwood Road
Attendance: 414
Referee: David Charlton

21 March 2026
14:30

(1 BP) Preston Grasshoppers	39 – 37	Sheffield Tigers (1 BP)

Lightfoot Green
Attendance: 414
Referee: Andrew Shaw

21 March 2026
15:00

(1 BP) Fylde	43 – 26	Otley (1 BP)

Woodlands Memorial Ground
Attendance: 910
Referee: Michael Harris

21 March 2026
15:00

(1 BP) Hull Ionians	29 – 38	Rossendale (1 BP)

Brantingham Park
Attendance: 272
Referee: Cameron Livingstone

21 March 2026
15:00

(1 BP) Macclesfield	52 – 31	Wharfedale (1 BP)

Priory Park
Attendance: 323
Referee: Peter Connor (Note: The Rugby Paper had two different referees listed for the Macclesfield v Wharfedale game on 21 March 2026 - Ben Simpson on the match report and Peter Connor on the results page. However, as Ben Simpson was listed as referring the National League 1 game between Rotherham Titans v Plymouth Albion on the same day, Peter Connor will be used.)

21 March 2026
15:00

(1 BP) Sheffield	31 – 21	Tynedale

Abbeydale Park
Attendance: 254
Referee: Timothy Allatt

=== Rounds 18 & 20 (rescheduled games) ===
28 March 2026
15:00

(1 BP) Scunthorpe	61 – 33	Preston Grasshoppers (1 BP)

Heslam Park
Attendance: 500
Referee: Thomas Hurdley

- Game rescheduled from 31 January 2026.

28 March 2026
15:00

(1 BP) Sheffield	43 – 24	Macclesfield (1 BP)

Abbeydale Park
Attendance: 322
Referee: Ben Rayner

- Game rescheduled from 21 February 2026. Sheffield are champions.

=== Round 24 ===
11 April 2026
14:00

(1 BP) Wharfedale	24 – 12	Sheffield

The Avenue
Attendance: 513
Referee: Michael Harris

11 April 2026
15:00

(1 BP) Darlington Mowden Park	43 – 24	Macclesfield (1 BP)

The Darlington Arena
Attendance: 349 (Note: The Rugby Paper gave 2 attendance figures for Darlington Mowden Park v Macclesfield on 12 April 2026 - 349 in the match report and 350 in the results page. The match report figure has been used.)
Referee: David Charlton

11 April 2026
15:00

(1 BP) Hull Ionians	33 – 26	Billingham (2 BP)

Brantingham Park
Attendance: 255
Referee: Daniel Woods

11 April 2026
15:00

Otley	14 – 22	Hull

Cross Green
Attendance: 332
Referee: Andrew Shaw

11 April 2026
15:00

(1 BP) Rossendale	19 – 25	Preston Grasshoppers

Marl Pits
Attendance: 275
Referee: Thomas Hurdley

11 April 2026
15:00

(1 BP) Sheffield Tigers	34 – 21	Fylde

Door Moor
Attendance: 204
Referee: Timothy Allatt

11 April 2026
15:00

(1 BP) Tynedale	44 – 19	Scunthorpe

Tynedale Park
Attendance: 720
Referee: Nikki O'Donnell

=== Round 25 ===
18 April 2026
14:00

Hull	19 – 35	Sheffield Tigers (1 BP)

Ferens Ground
Attendance: 425
Referee: Mark Hyde

- Hull are relegated.

18 April 2026
14:00

(2 BP) Scunthorpe	43 – 47	Wharfedale (1 BP)

Heslam Park
Attendance: 450
Referee: David Charlton

18 April 2026
14:15

Billingham	19 – 62	Tynedale (1 BP)

Greenwood Road
Attendance: 411
Referee: Michael Harris

18 April 2026
14:30

(1 BP) Preston Grasshoppers	53 – 19	Hull Ionians

Lightfoot Green
Attendance: 415
Referee: Spencer Pearce

18 April 2026
15:00

(1 BP) Fylde	31 – 24	Rossendale (2 BP)

Woodlands Memorial Ground
Attendance: 351
Referee: Timothy Allatt

18 April 2026
15:00

(1 BP) Macclesfield	45 – 29	Otley (1 BP)

Priory Park
Attendance: 462
Referee: Jack Moorhouse

18 April 2026
15:00

(1 BP) Sheffield	52 – 19	Darlington Mowden Park

Abbeydale Park
Attendance: 213
Referee: Cameron Livingstone

=== Round 26 ===
25 April 2026
15:00

(1 BP) Billingham	38 – 28	Preston Grasshoppers (1 BP)

Greenwood Road
Attendance: 450
Referee: Cameron Livingstone

25 April 2026
15:00

(1 BP) Darlington Mowden Park	50 – 43	Scunthorpe (2 BP)

The Darlington Arena
Attendance: 1,274
Referee: Michael Harris

- Scunthorpe are relegated.

25 April 2026
15:00

(1 BP) Hull Ionians	36 – 22	Fylde (1 BP)

Brantingham Park
Attendance: 581
Referee: Andrew Shaw

25 April 2026
15:00

(1 BP) Otley	42 – 36	Sheffield (2 BP)

Cross Green
Attendance: 262
Referee: David Charlton

25 April 2026
15:00

(1 BP) Rossendale	82 – 24	Hull

Marl Pits
Attendance: 202
Referee: Timothy Allatt

25 April 2026
15:00

(2 BP) Sheffield Tigers	34 – 38	Macclesfield (1 BP)

Dore Moor
Attendance: 314
Referee: Daniel Woods

25 April 2026
15:00

Wharfedale	20 – 45	Tynedale (1 BP)

The Avenue
Attendance: 851
Referee: Ben Rayner

=== Round 10 (rescheduled) ===
2 May 2026
15:00

(1 BP) Sheffield	80 – 0	Scunthorpe

Abbeydale Park
Attendance: 196
Referee: Daniel Woods

- Game rescheduled from 29 November 2025.

== Play-offs ==
=== National 2 Promotion Play-offs ===
The club that finished 11th in National League 1 would contest a playoff with the runners up of National League 2 East, National League 2 North and National League 2 West, with the National 1 club playing the National 2 club with the poorest league record and the other National League 2 clubs playing each other. Home advantage was given first to the highest league level and then the better league record.

9th May 2026
15:00

Birmingham Moseley (N1)	60 – 15	Luctonians (N2W)

Billesley Common
Attendance: 1,192
Referee: George Ounsley

9th May 2026
15:00

Tynedale (N2N)	20 – 29	Oundle (N2E)

Tynedale Park
Attendance: 820
Referee: Samuel Yates

=== National 1 Accession Final ===
The winners of the National 2 Promotion play-offs would face one another to decide who would be the final side to make up the 2026–27 National League 1.

16th May 2026
15:00

Birmingham Moseley (N1)	19 – 15	Oundle (N2E)

Billesley Common
Attendance: 1,113
Referee: Ben Simpson

- Birmingham Moseley remain in National League 1.

=== National League 2 North Accession Final ===
The winner of the Regional 1 North East and Regional 1 North West promotion play-off would play away to 12th placed Rossendale to decide who would be the final side to make up the 2026–27 National League 2 North.

9th May 2026
15:00

Rossendale (N2N)	14 – 21	Harrogate (R1NE)

Marl Pits
Attendance: 320
Referee: Daniel Parrott

- Rossendale are relegated with Harrogate promoted in their place.

== Attendances ==
- Does not include promotion/relegation play-offs.

Club	Home Games	Total	Average	Highest	Lowest	% Capacity
Billingham	13	5,235	403	664	265	27%
Darlington Mowden Park	13	9,662	743	1,274	349	3%
Fylde	13	8,192	630	1,394	346	8%
Hull	13	2,979	229	535	110	15%
Hull Ionians	13	4,114	316	581	140	21%
Macclesfield	13	3,764	290	462	180	23%
Otley	13	3,754	289	499	169	4%
Preston Grasshoppers	13	5,175	398	1,037	202	18%
Rossendale	13	3,155	243	350	189	22%
Scunthorpe	13	3,236	249	525	95	21%
Sheffield	13	5,225	402	1,725	196	12%
Sheffield Tigers	13	3,288	253	843	159	25%
Tynedale	13	7,048	542	720	253	27%
Wharfedale	13	6,466	497	851	309	25%

== Individual statistics ==
- Does not include promotion/relegation play-offs.

=== Top points scorers ===
Rank	Player	Team	Points
1	Harry Oliver	Macclesfield	291
2	Samuel Freeman	Preston Grasshoppers	265
3	Callum Posa	Sheffield	218
4	Flynn Ward	Darlington Mowden Park	210
5	Cameron Grant	Tynedale	187
6	Christian Hooper	Sheffield	170
7	Luke Wilson	Billingham	159
8	Archie Haddon	Wharfedale	156
9	Reece Dean	Hull	144
9	Ben Smith	Sheffield Tigers	144

=== Top try scorers ===
Rank	Player	Team	Tries
1	Christian Hooper	Sheffield	34
2	Elliot Fisher	Sheffield	22
2	Samson Shute	Macclesfield	22
3	Westleigh Holden	Hull Ionians	18
3	Harry Oliver	Macclesfield	18
3	Zakery Poole	Preston Grasshoppers	18
4	Adam Brankley	Hull Ionians	17
5	Harry Blackwell	Macclesfield	16
5	Liam Checksfield	Sheffield Tigers	16
6	Cameron Burnhill	Billingham	15
6	Samuel Freeman	Preston Grasshoppers	15
6	Seamus Hutton	Tynedale	15
6	Owain Williams	Preston Grasshoppers	15

== See also ==
- 2025–26 Champ Rugby
- 2025–26 National League 1
- 2025–26 National League 2 East
- 2025–26 National League 2 West
