= 2025–26 National League 1 =

Rugby union competition in England

- Countries: England
- Date: 6 September 2025 – 25 April 2026
- Champions: Rotherham Titans (1st title)
- Runners-up: Blackheath (also promoted)
- Relegated: Leicester Lions, Sedgley Park, Clifton
- Matches played: 182
- Attendance: 123,235 (average 677 per match)
- Highest attendance: 4,631 – Plymouth v Rams, 14 March 2026
- Lowest attendance: 121 – Tonbridge v Dings, 10 January 2026
- Tries scored: 1632 (average 9 per match)
- Top point scorer: 328 – Richard Hayes (Rotherham)
- Top try scorer: 48 – William Harding (Blackheath)

The 2025–26 National League 1 is the 38th season of the third tier of the English domestic rugby union competitions.

Rotherham Titans finished the season as league champions, a 34 – 26 victory against Sale FC on 25 April 2026, giving them victory on the very last day of the season, and automatic promotion to the 2026–27 Champ Rugby, in a competitive title battle with Blackheath and Plymouth Albion who finished 2nd and 3rd respectively and would compete in the promotion play-offs. Blackheath would also be promoted, winning their home playoff against Albion before defeating 2025–26 Champ Rugby play-off loser London Scottish to take their place in the 2026–27 Champ Rugby. For Rotherham it would be a return to tier 2 after an absence of 8 seasons, while for Blackheath it would be the first time at tier 2 1998–99 (27 seasons ago).

Leicester Lions were the first team to be relegated with four games still to play following a 35 – 59 defeat at home to Bishop's Stortford on 14 March 2026. The second relegation spot was taken by Sedgley Park on 18 April 2026 with one game to go, following a resounding 7 – 68 home defeat against title challengers Rotherham Titans. The final team to be automatically relegated was Clifton who lost their final game heavily to title challengers Blackheath on 25 April 2026. For Leicester Lions and Sedgley Park, relegation would end a stay of three seasons at level 3, while Clifton made an instant return. 12th Birmingham Moseley went into the relegation play-offs against the National League 2 sides but won both games, including the final against Oundle to remain in the division.

The other notable feature of the season was William Harding setting a National League 1 record of tries scored in a season - his tally of 48 beating the previous best set by Phil Chesters who had scored 42 back in the 2011–12 season.

== Structure ==
The league consists of fourteen teams, with all the teams playing each other on a home and away basis, to make a total of twenty-six matches each. For the 2025–26 season there is one automatic promotion place, with the champions going up to Champ Rugby, while clubs ranked 2nd and 3rd will contest the National League 1 playoff (the 2nd ranked team having home advantage), with the winner going on to play the 13th placed Champ Rugby side for a possible second promotion place.

Clubs finishing 12th, 13th and 14th will automatically be relegated to either, National League 2 East, National League 2 North or National League 2 West, depending on the geographical location of the team. The 11th placed side will enter a four team playoff with the runners up of the three tier 4 leagues, with one side going up/remaining in National League 1.

== Participating teams and locations ==
2025–26 National 1 teams in England
2025–26 Greater London National League 1 clubs

Team	Ground	Capacity	City/Area	Previous season
Birmingham Moseley	Billesley Common	5,000 (1,300 seats)	Birmingham, West Midlands	7th
Bishop's Stortford	Silver Leys	1,600	Bishop's Stortford, Hertfordshire	9th
Blackheath	Well Hall	1,650 (550 seats)	Eltham, London	6th
Clifton	Station Road	2,200 (200 seats)	Cribbs Causeway, Patchway, Bristol	Promoted from National League 2 West (champions)
Dings Crusaders	Shaftesbury Park	2,250 (250 seats)	Frenchay, Bristol	10th
Leeds Tykes	The Sycamores (Note: Leeds Tykes will also play one home game at the 19,700 capacity Headingley Stadium in Leeds.)	1,500	Bramhope, Leeds, West Yorkshire	Promoted from National League 2 North (champions)
Leicester Lions	Westleigh Park	2,000	Blaby, Leicestershire	12th (Note: Typically the 12th placed team would be relegated but Leicester Lions avoided relegation from the 2024–25 National League 1 due to the RFU Championship expanding from 12 to 14 teams ahead of the 2025–26 season.)
Plymouth Albion	The Brickfields	5,600	Plymouth, Devon	4th
Rams	Old Bath Road	2,000 (300 seats)	Sonning, Reading, Berkshire	5th
Rosslyn Park	The Rock	2,000 (630 seats)	Roehampton, London	2nd
Rotherham Titans	Clifton Lane	2,500	Rotherham, South Yorkshire	3rd
Sale FC	Heywood Road	3,387	Sale, Greater Manchester	8th
Sedgley Park	Park Lane	3,000	Whitefield, Bury, Greater Manchester	11th
Tonbridge Juddians	The Slade (Note: Tonbridge Juddians occasionally play home games at their 4G training pitch at Vizard (owned by The Judd School) in the event of flooding at their regular ground The Slade.)	1,500	Tonbridge, Kent	Promoted from National League 2 East (champions)

== League table ==
2025–26 National League 1 table
Pos	Team	Pld	W	D	L	PF	PA	PD	TB	LB	Pts	Qualification
1	Rotherham Titans (C, P)	26	22	0	4	1052	515	+537	20	3	111	Promotion place
2	Blackheath (P)	26	21	0	5	911	530	+381	20	3	107	Promotion play-off
3	Plymouth Albion	26	20	0	6	1000	549	+451	22	2	104	Promotion play-off
4	Rosslyn Park	26	17	0	9	944	709	+235	23	4	95	
5	Sale FC	26	17	0	9	826	590	+236	19	5	92	
6	Bishop's Stortford	26	13	0	13	781	836	−55	20	5	77	
7	Rams	26	13	0	13	780	798	−18	17	6	75	
8	Tonbridge Juddians	26	11	1	14	805	733	+72	19	7	72	
9	Leeds Tykes	26	11	0	15	658	873	−215	12	2	58	
10	Dings Crusaders	26	9	0	17	719	942	−223	16	5	57	
11	Birmingham Moseley	26	8	1	17	660	757	−97	14	8	56	Relegation play-off
12	Clifton (R)	26	9	0	17	621	909	−288	13	4	53	Relegation place
13	Sedgley Park (R)	26	8	0	18	547	923	−376	11	3	46	Relegation place
14	Leicester Lions (R)	26	2	0	24	599	1239	−640	13	2	23	Relegation place

Updated to match(es) played on 25 April 2026. Source: National League Rugby
Rules for classification: If teams are level at any stage, tiebreakers are applied in the following order:
1. Number of matches won
2. Number of matches drawn
3. Difference between points for and against
4. Total number of points for
5. Aggregate number of points scored in matches between tied teams
6. Number of matches won excluding the first match, then the second and so on until the tie is settled

== Fixtures & results ==
=== Round 1 ===
6 September 2025
14:00

Leicester Lions	14 – 46	Tonbridge Juddians (1 BP)

Westleigh Park
Attendance: 223
Referee: Alan Chandrachud

6 September 2025
14:30

Clifton	17 – 34	Blackheath (1 BP)

Station Road
Attendance: 362
Referee: Adam Wookey

6 September 2025
14:30

(1 BP) Sale FC	28 – 43	Rotherham Titans (1 BP)

Heywood Road
Attendance: 747
Referee: Daniel Rowlands

6 September 2025
14:30

(1 BP) Sedgley Park	18 – 24	Rams (1 BP)

Park Lane
Attendance: 389
Referee: Alex Powdrell

6 September 2025
15:00

(1 BP) Bishops Stortford	26 – 12	Birmingham Moseley

Silver Leys
Attendance: 543
Referee: Ben Simpson

6 September 2025
15:00

Leeds Tykes	12 – 45	Plymouth Albion (1 BP)

The Sycamores
Attendance: 537
Referee: Jack Moorhouse

6 September 2025
15:00

(1 BP) Rosslyn Park	45 – 10	Dings Crusaders

The Rock
Attendance: 542
Referee: Callum Watson

=== Round 2 ===
13 September 2025
14:00

(1 BP) Rotherham Titans	52 – 12	Leeds Tykes

Clifton Lane
Attendance: 415
Referee: Ben Simpson

13 September 2025
14:30

Sedgley Park	27 – 22	Sale FC (2 BP)

Park Lane
Attendance: 376
Referee: Timothy Allatt

13 September 2025
15:00

(1 BP) Birmingham Moseley	49 – 21	Leicester Lions

Billesley Common
Attendance: 630
Referee: Jack Moorhouse

13 September 2025
15:00

(1 BP) Blackheath	33 – 31	Bishop's Stortford (2 BP)

Well Hall
Attendance: 580
Referee: Alex Powdrell

13 September 2025
15:00

(1 BP) Plymouth Albion	62 – 5	Clifton

The Brickfields
Attendance: 1,419
Referee: Callum Watson

13 September 2025
15:00

(1 BP) Rams	73 – 24	Dings Crusaders (1 BP)

Old Bath Road
Attendance: 973
Referee: Daniel Rowlands

13 September 2025
15:00

(1 BP) Tonbridge Juddians	22 – 29	Rosslyn Park (1 BP)

The Slade
Attendance: 322
Referee: Adam Wookey

=== Round 3 ===
20 September 2025
14:00

Leicester Lions	12 – 47	Blackheath (1 BP)

Westleigh Park
Attendance: 324
Referee: George Ounsley

20 September 2025
14:30

Clifton	15 – 40	Rotherham Titans (1 BP)

Station Road
Attendance: 552
Referee: Callum Watson

20 September 2025
14:30

(1 BP) Sale FC	31 – 17	Rams

Heywood Road
Attendance: 801
Referee: Alex Powdrell

20 September 2025
15:00

Bishop's Stortford	15 – 31	Plymouth Albion (1 BP)

Silver Leys
Attendance: 507
Referee: Jack Moorhouse

20 September 2025
15:00

Dings Crusaders	21 – 34	Tonbridge Juddians (1 BP)

Shaftesbury Park
Attendance: 700
Referee: Holly Wood

20 September 2025
15:00

Leeds Tykes	8 – 20	Sedgley Park

The Sycamores
Attendance: 311
Referee: Ben Rayner

20 September 2025
15:00

(1 BP) Rosslyn Park	47 – 24	Birmingham Moseley

The Rock
Attendance: 642
Referee: Ben Simpson

=== Round 4 ===
27 September 2025
14:00

(1 BP) Rotherham Titans	71 – 12	Bishop's Stortford

Clifton Lane
Attendance: 703
Referee: Ben Rayner

27 September 2025
14:30

(1 BP) Sale FC	38 – 15	Leeds Tykes

Heywood Road
Attendance: 813
Referee: George Ounsley

27 September 2025
14:30

(1 BP) Sedgley Park	30 – 41	Clifton (1 BP)

Park Lane
Attendance: 350 (Note: The Rugby Paper gave 2 attendances for Sedgley Park's home game versus Clifton on 27 September 2025 - 350 on the match report and 400 on the results page. The match report figure will be used until further notice.)
Referee: Samuel Yates

27 September 2025
15:00

Birmingham Moseley	19 – 34	Dings Crusaders (1 BP)

Billesley Common
Attendance: 575
Referee: David Charlton

27 September 2025
15:00

(1 BP) Blackheath	27 – 31	Rosslyn Park (1 BP)

Well Hall
Attendance: 450
Referee: Ben Simpson

27 September 2025
15:00

(1 BP) Plymouth Albion	45 – 22	Leicester Lions (1 BP)

The Brickfields
Attendance: 1,482
Referee: Adam Wookey

27 September 2025
15:00

(1 BP) Rams	40 – 19	Tonbridge Juddians

Old Bath Road
Attendance: 784
Referee: Callum Watson

=== Round 5 ===
4 October 2025
14:00

Leicester Lions	25 – 41	Rotherham Titans (1 BP)

Westleigh Park
Attendance: 227 (Note: The Rugby Paper gave 2 attendances for Leicester Lions home game versus Rotherham Titans on 4 October 2025 - 227 on the match report and 278 on the results page. The match report figure will be used until further notice.)
Referee: Samuel Yates

4 October 2025
15:00

(1 BP) Bishop's Stortford	15 – 20	Sedgley Park

Silver Leys
Attendance: 401
Referee: Holly Wood

4 October 2025
15:00

(1 BP) Clifton	17 – 24	Sale FC (1 BP)

Station Road
Attendance: 432 (Note: The Rugby Paper gave 2 attendances for Clifton's home game versus Sale FC on 4 October 2025 - 432 on the match report and 300 on the results page. The match report figure will be used until further notice.)
Referee: Jack Moorhouse

4 October 2025
15:00

(2 BP) Dings Crusaders	31 – 36	Blackheath (1 BP)

Shaftesbury Park
Attendance: 363
Referee: George Ounsley

4 October 2025
15:00

Leeds Tykes	7 – 19	Rams

The Sycamores
Attendance: 357
Referee: Timothy Allatt

4 October 2025
15:00

(1 BP) Rosslyn Park	29 – 14	Plymouth Albion

The Rock
Attendance: 590
Referee: Daniel Rowlands

4 October 2025
15:00

(1 BP) Tonbridge Juddians	31 – 17	Birmingham Moseley

The Slade
Attendance: 267
Referee: Alex Powdrell

=== Round 6 ===
11 October 2025
14:00

(1 BP) Rotherham Titans	27 – 26	Rosslyn Park (2 BP)

Clifton Lane
Attendance: 1,260
Referee: Ben Rayner

11 October 2025
14:30

(1 BP) Sale FC	43 – 12	Bishop's Stortford

Heywood Road
Attendance: 813
Referee: Alex Powdrell

11 October 2025
14:30

(1 BP) Sedgley Park	52 – 29	Leicester Lions (1 BP)

Park Lane
Attendance: 298
Referee: Jack Moorhouse

11 October 2025
15:00

(1 BP) Blackheath	40 – 0	Tonbridge Juddians

Well Hall
Attendance: 854
Referee: Samuel Yates

11 October 2025
15:00

Leeds Tykes	27 – 24	Clifton (2 BP)

The Sycamores
Attendance: 309
Referee: Ben Simpson

11 October 2025
15:00

(1 BP) Plymouth Albion	64 – 17	Dings Crusaders

The Brickfields
Attendance: 1,881
Referee: Holly Wood

11 October 2025
15:00

(1 BP) Rams	31 – 28	Birmingham Moseley (2 BP)

Old Bath Road
Attendance: 1,054
Referee: Daniel Rowlands

=== Round 7 ===
18 October 2025
14:00

(1 BP) Leicester Lions	35 – 31	Sale FC (2 BP)

Westleigh Park
Attendance: 276
Referee: Timothy Allatt

18 October 2025
15:00

(1 BP) Birmingham Moseley	32 – 19	Blackheath

Billesley Common
Attendance: 880
Referee: Jack Moorhouse

18 October 2025
15:00

(1 BP) Bishop's Stortford	36 – 46	Leeds Tykes (1 BP)

Silver Leys
Attendance: 445
Referee: George Ounsley

18 October 2025
15:00

(1 BP) Clifton	14 – 21	Rams

Station Road
Attendance: 560 (Note: The Rugby Paper gave 2 attendances for Clifton's home game versus Rams on 18 October 2025 - 500 on the match report and 560 on the results page. The results figure will be used until further notice as it is more specific.)
Referee: Ben Rayner

18 October 2025
15:00

(1 BP) Rosslyn Park	68 – 19	Sedgley Park

The Rock
Attendance: 650
Referee: Holly Wood

18 October 2025
15:00

(1 BP) Tonbridge Juddians	35 – 25	Plymouth Albion (1 BP)

The Slade
Attendance: 313
Referee: Callum Watson

18 October 2025
15:30

(1 BP) Dings Crusaders	50 – 31	Rotherham Titans (1 BP)

Shaftesbury Park
Attendance: 531
Referee: Alex Powdrell

=== Round 8 ===
25 October 2025
14:00

(1 BP) Rotherham Titans	38 – 28	Tonbridge Juddians (1 BP)

Clifton Lane
Attendance: 720
Referee: Ben Rayner

25 October 2025
14:30

(1 BP) Sale FC	24 – 27	Rosslyn Park (1 BP)

Heywood Road
Attendance: 830
Referee: George Ounsley

25 October 2025
14:30

(1 BP) Sedgley Park	29 – 22	Dings Crusaders (2 BP)

Park Lane
Attendance: 301
Referee: Callum Watson

25 October 2025
15:00

(1 BP) Clifton	55 – 29	Bishop's Stortford (1 BP)

Station Road
Attendance: 295
Referee: Timothy Allatt

25 October 2025
15:00

(1 BP) Leeds Tykes	19 – 24	Leicester Lions (1 BP)

The Sycamores
Attendance: 347
Referee: Daniel Rowlands

25 October 2025
15:00

Rams	7 – 26	Blackheath (1 BP)

Old Bath Road
Attendance: 702
Referee: Ben Simpson

25 October 2025
19:45

(1 BP) Plymouth Albion	36 – 21	Birmingham Moseley

The Brickfields
Attendance: 2,027
Referee: Adam Wookey

=== Round 9 ===
8 November 2025
14:00

(2 BP) Leicester Lions	26 – 29	Clifton (1 BP)

Westleigh Park
Attendance: 290
Referee: Ben Rayner

8 November 2025
14:30

(1 BP) Tonbridge Juddians	56 – 0	Sedgley Park

The Slade
Attendance: 319
Referee: Holly Wood

8 November 2025
15:00

Birmingham Moseley	15 – 33	Rotherham Titans

Billesley Common
Attendance: 780
Referee: Jack Moorhouse

8 November 2025
15:00

(1 BP) Bishop's Stortford	36 – 29	Rams (2 BP)

Silver Leys
Attendance: 453
Referee: Callum Watson

8 November 2025
15:00

(1 BP) Blackheath	40 – 28	Plymouth Albion (1 BP)

Well Hall
Attendance: 620
Referee: George Ounsley

8 November 2025
15:00

Dings Crusaders	12 – 58	Sale FC (1 BP)

Shaftesbury Park
Attendance: 301
Referee: Ben Simpson

8 November 2025
15:00

(1 BP) Rosslyn Park	53 – 17	Leeds Tykes

The Rock
Attendance: 680
Referee: Daniel Rowlands

=== Round 10 ===
15 November 2025
14:00

Rotherham Titans	24 – 19	Blackheath (1 BP)

Clifton Lane
Attendance: 571
Referee: Ben Simpson

15 November 2025
14:30

(1 BP) Leeds Tykes	26 – 17	Dings Crusaders

The Sycamores
Attendance: 284
Referee: Alex Powdrell

15 November 2025
14:30

(1 BP) Sale FC	33 – 26	Tonbridge Juddians (2 BP)

Heywood Road
Attendance: 723
Referee: Jack Moorhouse

15 November 2025
14:30

(1 BP) Sedgley Park	28 – 27	Birmingham Moseley (2 BP)

Park Lane
Attendance: 334
Referee: Samuel Yates

15 November 2025
15:00

(1 BP) Bishop's Stortford	48 – 29	Leicester Lions (1 BP)

Silver Leys
Attendance: 367
Referee: Callum Watson

15 November 2025
15:00

(1 BP) Clifton	37 – 29	Rosslyn Park (1 BP)

Station Road
Attendance: 410
Referee: Adam Wookey

15 November 2025
15:00

Rams	15 – 34	Plymouth Albion (1 BP)

Old Bath Road
Attendance: 843
Referee: Ben Rayner

=== Round 11 ===
22 November 2025
14:00

Leicester Lions	24 – 38	Rams (1 BP)

Westleigh Park
Attendance: 242
Referee: Adam Wookey

22 November 2025
14:00

(2 BP) Tonbridge Juddians	31 – 38	Leeds Tykes (1 BP)

The Slade
Attendance: 193
Referee: Alan Chandrachud

22 November 2025
15:00

(1 BP) Birmingham Moseley	13 – 15	Sale FC

Billesley Common
Attendance: 388
Referee: George Ounsley

22 November 2025
15:00

(1 BP) Blackheath	31 – 3	Sedgley Park

Well Hall
Attendance: 520
Referee: Alex Powdrell

22 November 2025
15:00

(1 BP) Dings Crusaders	24 – 35	Clifton (1 BP)

Shaftesbury Park
Attendance: 654
Referee: Jack Moorhouse

22 November 2025
15:00

Plymouth Albion	22 – 21	Rotherham Titans (1 BP)

The Brickfields
Attendance: 1,939
Referee: Daniel Rowlands

22 November 2025
15:00

(1 BP) Rosslyn Park	27 – 28	Bishop's Stortford (1 BP)

The Rock
Attendance: 449
Referee: Samuel Yates

=== Round 12 ===
6 December 2025
14:00

Leicester Lions	13 – 26	Rosslyn Park (1 BP)

Westleigh Park
Attendance: 245
Referee: Callum Watson

6 December 2025
14:30

Leeds Tykes	17 – 42	Birmingham Moseley (1 BP)

The Sycamores
Attendance: 384
Referee: Ben Rayner

6 December 2025
14:30

(1 BP) Sale FC	26 – 21	Blackheath (1 BP)

Heywood Road
Attendance: 701
Referee: Samuel Yates

6 December 2025
14:30

(1 BP) Sedgley Park	26 – 50	Plymouth Albion (1 BP)

Park Lane
Attendance: 302
Referee: Jack Moorhouse

6 December 2025
15:00

(1 BP) Bishop's Stortford	33 – 26	Dings Crusaders (2 BP)

Silver Leys
Attendance: 360
Referee: Daniel Rowlands

6 December 2025
15:00

Clifton	12 – 28	Tonbridge Juddians (1 BP)

Station Road
Attendance: 402
Referee: Adam Wookey

6 December 2025
15:00

(2 BP) Rams	31 – 35	Rotherham Titans (1 BP)

Old Bath Road
Attendance: 820
Referee: George Ounsley

=== Round 13 ===
13 December 2025
14:00

(1 BP) Rotherham Titans	40 – 15	Sedgley Park

Clifton Lane
Attendance: 326
Referee: Alan Chandrachud

13 December 2025
14:00

(2 BP) Tonbridge Juddians	24 – 26	Bishop's Stortford (1 BP)

The Slade
Attendance: 297
Referee: Callum Watson

13 December 2025
15:00

(1 BP) Birmingham Moseley	38 – 7	Clifton

Billesley Common
Attendance: 655
Referee: Jack Moorhouse

13 December 2025
15:00

(1 BP) Blackheath	36 – 28	Leeds Tykes (1 BP)

Well Hall
Attendance: 620
Referee: Ben Rayner

13 December 2025
15:00

(1 BP) Dings Crusaders	41 – 24	Leicester Lions (1 BP)

Shaftesbury Park
Attendance: 281
Referee: Samuel Yates

13 December 2025
15:00

Plymouth Albion	24 – 14	Sale FC

The Brickfields
Attendance: 1,944
Referee: Alex Powdrell

13 December 2025
15:00

(1 BP) Rosslyn Park	29 – 40	Rams (1 BP)

The Rock
Attendance: 810
Referee: Ben Simpson

=== Round 14 ===
19 December 2025
20:00

(1 BP) Rosslyn Park	12 – 17	Tonbridge Juddians

The Rock
Attendance: 713
Referee: Alex Powdrell

20 December 2025
14:00

Leicester Lions	19 – 28	Birmingham Moseley (1 BP)

Westleigh Park
Attendance: 456
Referee: Ben Simpson

20 December 2025
14:30

(1 BP) Sale FC	29 – 13	Sedgley Park

Heywood Road
Attendance: 1,140
Referee: Alan Chandrachud

20 December 2025
15:00

(2 BP) Bishop's Stortford	27 – 29	Blackheath (1 BP)

Silver Leys
Attendance: 746
Referee: George Ounsley

20 December 2025
15:00

Clifton	10 – 35	Plymouth Albion (1 BP)

Station Road
Attendance: 526
Referee: Timothy Allatt

20 December 2025
15:00

(1 BP) Dings Crusaders	31 – 25	Rams (2 BP)

Shaftesbury Park
Attendance: 451
Referee: Adam Wookey

20 December 2025
15:00

Leeds Tykes	19 – 18	Rotherham Titans (1 BP)

Headlingley Stadium
Attendance: 1,024
Referee: Jack Moorhouse

=== Round 15 ===
10 January 2026
14:00

Rotherham Titans	P – P	Clifton

Clifton Lane

- Postponed due to frozen pitch. Game to be rescheduled for 7 February 2026.

10 January 2026
14:00

(1 BP) Tonbridge Juddians	36 – 31	Dings Crusaders (2 BP)

Vizard, The Judd School (Note: Tonbridge Juddians had to switch their home game against Dings Crusaders on 10 January 2026 to their 4G training pitch at Vizard (The Judd School) due to The Slade being flooded following heavy rain..)
Attendance: 121
Referee: Alex Powdrell

10 January 2026
14:30

Sedgley Park	P – P	Leeds Tykes

Park Lane

- Postponed due to frozen pitch. Game to be rescheduled for 6 February 2026.

10 January 2026
15:00

Birmingham Moseley	P – P	Rosslyn Park

Billesley Common

- Postponed due to frozen pitch. Game to be rescheduled for 7 February 2026.

10 January 2026
15:00

(1 BP) Blackheath	52 – 19	Leicester Lions

Well Hall
Attendance: 605
Referee: Callum Watson

10 January 2026
15:00

(1 BP) Plymouth Albion	39 – 17	Bishop's Stortford

The Brickfields
Attendance: 2,416
Referee: Adam Wookey

10 January 2026
15:00

(1 BP) Rams	12 – 18	Sale FC

Old Bath Road
Attendance: 772
Referee: George Ounsley

=== Round 16 ===
16 January 2026
19:45

(1 BP) Leeds Tykes	14 – 19	Sale FC

The Sycamores
Attendance: 987
Referee: Jack Moorhouse

17 January 2026
14:00

Leicester Lions	17 – 47	Plymouth Albion (1 BP)

Westleigh Park
Attendance: 345
Referee: George Ounsley

17 January 2026
14:00

(2 BP) Tonbridge Juddians	33 – 35	Rams (1 BP)

Vizard, The Judd School (Note: For the second week running Tonbridge Juddians had to switch their home fixture (this time against Rams on 17 January 2026) due to their 4G training pitch at Vizard (The Judd School) due to The Slade being flooded following heavy rain..)
Attendance: 147 (Note: The Rugby Paper gave two attendances for Tonbridge Juddians v Rams on 17 January 2026 - 143 in the match report and 181 on the results page. The match report figure will be used until further notice.)
Referee: Callum Watson

17 January 2026
15:00

(1 BP) Bishop's Stortford	27 – 35	Rotherham Titans (1 BP)

Silver Leys
Attendance: 565
Referee: Alex Powdrell

17 January 2026
15:00

(1 BP) Clifton	24 – 10	Sedgley Park

Station Road
Attendance: 416
Referee: Ben Raynor

17 January 2026
15:00

Dings Crusaders	25 – 19	Birmingham Moseley (1 BP)

Shaftesbury Park
Attendance: 423
Referee: Ben Simpson

17 January 2026
15:00

(1 BP) Rosslyn Park	36 – 19	Blackheath

The Rock
Attendance: 1,000
Referee: Sam Yates

=== Round 17 ===
24 January 2026
14:00

(1 BP) Rotherham Titans	73 – 24	Leicester Lions (1 BP)

Clifton Lane
Attendance: 605
Referee: Adam Wookey

24 January 2026
14:30

(1 BP) Sale FC	57 – 0	Clifton

Heywood Road
Attendance: 814
Referee: Callum Watson

24 January 2026
14:30

(1 BP) Sedgley Park	30 – 14	Bishop's Stortford

Park Lane
Attendance: 310
Referee: Jack Moorhouse

24 January 2026
15:00

(1 BP) Birmingham Moseley	27 – 27	Tonbridge Juddians (1 BP)

Billesley Common
Attendance: 626
Referee: Alan Chandrachud

24 January 2026
15:00

(1 BP) Blackheath	43 – 7	Dings Crusaders

Well Hall
Attendance: 605
Referee: George Ounsley

24 January 2026
15:00

(1 BP) Plymouth Albion	41 – 10	Rosslyn Park

The Brickfields
Attendance: 2,086
Referee: Ben Simpson

24 January 2026
15:00

(1 BP) Rams	34 – 24	Leeds Tykes (1 BP)

Old Bath Road
Attendance: 723
Referee: Samuel Yates

=== Round 18 ===
31 January 2026
14:00

Leicester Lions	14 – 24	Sedgley Park (1 BP)

Westleigh Park
Attendance: 257
Referee: Alan Chandrachud

31 January 2026
14:00

Tonbridge Juddians	19 – 31	Blackheath (1 BP)

The Slade
Attendance: 312
Referee: Samuel Yates

31 January 2026
15:00

(1 BP) Birmingham Moseley	31 – 24	Rams (2 BP)

Billesley Common
Attendance: 529
Referee: Adam Wookey

31 January 2026
15:00

(1 BP) Bishop's Stortford	26 – 21	Sale FC (1 BP)

Silver Leys
Attendance: 302 (Note: The Rugby Paper gave 2 attendances for Bishop's Stortford v Sale FC on 31 January 2026 - 302 on the match report and 568 on the results page. The match report figure will be used until further notice.)
Referee: Callum Watson

31 January 2026
15:00

Clifton	19 – 34	Leeds Tykes (1 BP)

Station Road
Attendance: 365
Referee: Ben Rayner

31 January 2026
15:00

(1 BP) Dings Crusaders	24 – 52	Plymouth Albion (1 BP)

Shaftesbury Park
Attendance: 433
Referee: Alex Powdrell

31 January 2026
15:00

(1 BP) Rosslyn Park	26 – 36	Rotherham Titans (1 BP)

The Rock
Attendance: 463
Referee: George Ounsley

=== Round 15 (rescheduled games) ===
6 February 2026
20:00

Sedgley Park	17 – 46	Leeds Tykes (1 BP)

Park Lane
Attendance: 420
Referee: George Ounsley

- Game rescheduled from 10 January 2026.

7 February 2026
14:00

(1 BP) Rotherham Titans	54 – 0	Clifton

Clifton Lane
Attendance: 531
Referee: Jack Moorhouse

- Game rescheduled from 10 January 2026.

7 February 2026
15:00

Birmingham Moseley	P – P	Rosslyn Park

Billesley Common

- Game rescheduled from 10 January 2026 but postponed again due to waterlogged pitch. Game to be rescheduled for 7 March 2026.

=== Round 19 ===
14 February 2026
14:00

(1 BP) Rotherham Titans	47 – 12	Dings Crusaders

Clifton Lane
Attendance: 710
Referee: Owen Taylor

14 February 2026
14:30

Leeds Tykes	P – P	Bishop's Stortford

The Sycamores

- Postponed due to frozen pitch. Game to be rescheduled for 7 March 2026.

14 February 2026
14:30

Sedgley Park	19 – 33	Rosslyn Park (1 BP)

Park Lane
Attendance: 354
Referee: Daniel Rowlands

14 February 2026
14:30

(1 BP) Sale FC	52 – 24	Leicester Lions (1 BP)

Heywood Road
Attendance: 733
Referee: Jack Sargentina

14 February 2026
15:00

(1 BP) Blackheath	55 – 12	Birmingham Moseley

Well Hall
Attendance: 310
Referee: Samuel Yates

14 February 2026
15:00

(1 BP) Plymouth Albion	26 – 20	Tonbridge Juddians (1 BP)

The Brickfields
Attendance: 1,853
Referee: Ben Simpson

14 February 2026
15:00

(1 BP) Rams	45 – 25	Clifton

Old Bath Road
Attendance: 614
Referee: Alan Chandrachud

=== Round 20 ===
21 February 2026
14:00

(2 BP) Leicester Lions	29 – 33	Leeds Tykes (1 BP)

Westleigh Park
Attendance: 236
Referee: Adam Wookey

21 February 2026
14:00

Tonbridge Juddians	21 – 41	Rotherham Titans (1 BP)

The Slade
Attendance: 282
Referee: George Ounsley

21 February 2026
15:00

(1 BP) Bishop's Stortford	34 – 19	Clifton

Silver Leys
Attendance: 419
Referee: Jack Sargentina

21 February 2026
15:00

Blackheath	21 – 5	Rams

Well Hall
Attendance: 431
Referee: Jack Moorhouse

21 February 2026
15:00

Dings Crusaders	19 – 0	Sedgley Park

Shaftesbury Park
Attendance: 294
Referee: Callum Watson

21 February 2026
15:00

(1 BP) Rosslyn Park	36 – 34	Sale FC (2 BP)

The Rock
Attendance: 249 (Note: The Rugby Paper provided 2 attendance figures for Rosslyn Park v Sale FC on 21 February 2026 - 249 on the match report and 250 in the results page. Although both results seem very low, the match report figure will be used at present.)
Referee: Alex Powdrell

21 February 2026
16:30

(1 BP) Birmingham Moseley	20 – 27	Plymouth Albion (1 BP)

Billesley Common
Attendance: 550
Referee: Owen Taylor

=== Round 21 ===
28 February 2026
14:00

(1 BP) Rotherham Titans	33 – 7	Birmingham Moseley

Clifton Lane
Attendance: 597
Referee: Daniel Rowlands

28 February 2026
14:30

(1 BP) Leeds Tykes	45 – 38	Rosslyn Park (2 BP)

The Sycamores
Attendance: 382
Referee: Samuel Yates

28 February 2026
14:30

(2 BP) Sedgley Park	28 – 31	Tonbridge Juddians (1 BP)

Park Lane
Attendance: 390
Referee: Jack Moorhouse

28 February 2026
14:30

(1 BP) Sale FC	47 – 12	Dings Crusaders

Heywood Road
Attendance: 834
Referee: Owen Taylor

28 February 2026
15:00

(1 BP) Clifton	54 – 40	Leicester Lions (1 BP)

Station Road
Attendance: 258
Referee: Alex Powdrell

28 February 2026
15:00

(1 BP) Plymouth Albion	26 – 34	Blackheath (1 BP)

The Brickfields
Attendance: 2,550
Referee: George Ounsley

28 February 2026
15:00

(2 BP) Rams	31 – 36	Bishop's Stortford (1 BP)

Old Bath Road
Attendance: 956
Referee: Jack Sargentina

=== Rounds 15 & 19 (rescheduled games) ===
7 March 2026
14:30

Leeds Tykes	19 – 31	Bishop's Stortford (1 BP)

The Sycamores
Attendance: 290
Referee: Jack Moorhouse

- Game rescheduled from 14 February 2026.

7 March 2026
15:00

(2 BP) Birmingham Moseley	31 – 35	Rosslyn Park (1 BP)

Billesley Common
Attendance: 303
Referee: Peter Connor (Note: The Rugby Paper listed Peter Connor as the referee for Birmingham Moseley v Rosslyn Park on 7 March 2026 despite him also being listed as referee for the National League 2 North fixture between Rossendale & Sheffield on the same day.)

- Game rescheduled from 7 February 2026.

=== Round 22 ===
14 March 2026
14:00

(1 BP) Leicester Lions	35 – 59	Bishop's Stortford (1 BP)

Westleigh Park
Attendance: 356
Referee: Alex Powdrell

- Leicester Lions are relegated.

14 March 2026
14:30

(1 BP) Tonbridge Juddians	33 – 41	Sale FC (1 BP)

The Slade
Attendance: 211
Referee: Jack Moorhouse

14 March 2026
15:00

Birmingham Moseley	22 – 20	Sedgley Park (1 BP)

Billesley Common
Attendance: 640
Referee: Alan Chandrachud

14 March 2026
15:00

(1 BP) Blackheath	22 – 15	Rotherham Titans (1 BP)

Well Hall
Attendance: 715
Referee: Owen Taylor

14 March 2026
15:00

(1 BP) Dings Crusaders	62 – 31	Leeds Tykes (1 BP)

Shaftesbury Park
Attendance: 356
Referee: George Ounsley

14 March 2026
15:00

(1 BP) Plymouth Albion	60 – 26	Rams (1 BP)

The Brickfields
Attendance: 4,631 (Note: Plymouth Albion's crowd of 4,631 was a National League 1 record.)
Referee: Samuel Yates

14 March 2026
15:00

(1 BP) Rosslyn Park	43 – 40	Clifton (2 BP)

The Rock
Attendance: 700
Referee: Ben Rayner

=== Round 23 ===
21 March 2026
14:00

Rotherham Titans	22 – 19	Plymouth Albion (1 BP)

Clifton Lane
Attendance: 1,223
Referee: Ben Simpson

21 March 2026
14:30

(1 BP) Sale FC	47 – 31	Birmingham Moseley (1 BP)

Heywood Road
Attendance: 877
Referee: Callum Watson

21 March 2026
14:30

(1 BP) Sedgley Park	28 – 61	Blackheath (1 BP)

Park Lane
Attendance: 412
Referee: Alex Powdrell

21 March 2026
15:00

(1 BP) Bishop's Stortford	59 – 33	Rosslyn Park (1 BP)

Silver Leys
Attendance: 747
Referee: Adam Wookey

21 March 2026
15:00

(1 BP) Clifton	28 – 24	Dings Crusaders (2 BP)

Station Road
Attendance: 995
Referee: Alan Chandrachud

21 March 2026
15:00

(1 BP) Leeds Tykes	53 – 48	Tonbridge Juddians (2 BP)

The Sycamores
Attendance: 378
Referee: George Ounsley

21 March 2026
15:00

(1 BP) Rams	71 – 38	Leicester Lions (1 BP)

Old Bath Road
Attendance: 764
Referee: Jack Sargentina

=== Round 24 ===
11 April 2026
14:00

(1 BP) Rotherham Titans	80 – 7	Rams

Clifton Lane
Attendance: 867 (Note: The Rugby Paper had 2 attendance figures for Rotherham Titans v Rams on 11 April 2026 - 267 in the match report and 867 on the results page. Due to Rotherham being involved in a promotion challenge the results page figure has been used.)
Referee: Ben Rayner

11 April 2026
15:00

(1 BP) Blackheath	40 – 19	Sale FC

Well Hall
Attendance: 749 (Note: The Rugby Paper had 2 attendance figures for Blackheath v Sale FC on 11 April 2026 - 749 in the match report and 750 on the results page. The match report figure has been used.)
Referee: George Ounsley

11 April 2026
15:00

(1 BP) Dings Crusaders	40 – 34	Bishop's Stortford (2 BP)

Shaftesbury Park
Attendance: 377
Referee: Alan Chandrachud

11 April 2026
15:00

(1 BP) Rosslyn Park	88 – 7	Leicester Lions

The Rock
Attendance: 956
Referee: Nathan Howarth

11 April 2026
15:00

(1 BP) Tonbridge Juddians	33 – 24	Clifton (1 BP)

The Slade
Attendance: 264
Referee: Jack Sargentina

11 April 2026
16:00

(2 BP) Birmingham Moseley	24 – 25	Leeds Tykes

Billesley Common
Attendance: 1,108
Referee: Owen Taylor

11 April 2026
16:00

(1 BP) Plymouth Albion	68 – 24	Sedgley Park (1 BP)

The Brickfields
Attendance: 2,405
Referee: Callum Watson

=== Round 25 ===
18 April 2026
14:00

Leicester Lions	21 – 63	Dings Crusaders (1 BP)

Westleigh Park
Attendance: 185
Referee: Adam Wookey

18 April 2026
14:30

(1 BP) Sale FC	29 – 26	Plymouth Albion (2 BP)

Heywood Road
Attendance: 968
Referee: Ben Rayner

18 April 2026
14:30

Sedgley Park	7 – 68	Rotherham Titans (1 BP)

Park Lane
Attendance: 773 (Note: The Rugby Paper gave 2 attendances for Sedgley Park v Rotherham Titans on 18 April 2026 - 481 in the match report and 773 on the results page. As this was a key game for both sides the higher figure from the results page will be used until further notice.)
Referee: Jack Sargentina

- Sedgley Park are relegated.

18 April 2026
15:00

(1 BP) Bishop's Stortford	37 – 24	Tonbridge Juddians (1 BP)

Silver Leys
Attendance: 1,074
Referee: Nathan Howarth

18 April 2026
15:00

(1 BP) Clifton	42 – 36	Birmingham Moseley (2 BP)

Station Road
Attendance: 648
Referee: Ben Simpson

18 April 2026
15:00

Rams	19 – 36	Rosslyn Park (1 BP)

Old Bath Road
Attendance: 815
Referee: Alan Chandrachud

18 April 2026
15:50

Leeds Tykes	19 – 43	Blackheath (1 BP)

The Sycamores
Attendance: 502
Referee: Samuel Yates

=== Round 26 ===
25 April 2026
15:00

(1 BP) Birmingham Moseley	35 – 33	Bishop's Stortford (2 BP)

Billesley Common
Attendance: 1,075
Referee: Alan Chandrachud

25 April 2026
15:00

(1 BP) Blackheath	52 – 28	Clifton (1 BP)

Well Hall
Attendance: 1,047
Referee: Jack Moorhouse

- Clifton are relegated.

25 April 2026
15:00

(1 BP) Dings Crusaders	40 – 52	Rosslyn Park (1 BP)

Shaftesbury Park
Attendance: 802
Referee: Samuel Yates

25 April 2026
15:00

(1 BP) Plymouth Albion	54 – 24	Leeds Tykes (1 BP)

The Brickfields
Attendance: 2,324
Referee: Adam Wookey

25 April 2026
15:00

(1 BP) Rams	61 – 40	Sedgley Park (1 BP)

Old Bath Road
Attendance: 817
Referee: Callum Watson

25 April 2026
15:00

(1 BP) Rotherham Titans	34 – 26	Sale FC (1 BP)

Clifton Lane
Attendance: 1,582
Referee: George Ounsley

- Rotherham Titans are champions.

25 April 2026
15:00

(1 BP) Tonbridge Juddians	83 – 14	Leicester Lions

The Slade
Attendance: 521
Referee: Ben Simpson

== Play-offs ==
=== National 1 Promotion Play-off ===
Clubs that finished 2nd and 3rd in National 1 would contest a playoff to see who would take part in the Champ Accession Final play-off with the 2nd placed team having home advantage.

9th May 2026
15:00

Blackheath (2)	22–10	(3) Plymouth Albion

Well Hall
Attendance: 1,509
Referee: Ben Rayner

=== Champ Accession Final ===
The winner of the National 1 promotion play-off would contest a final playoff away to the loser of the Champ relegation play-off to make up the final team to take part in the 2026–27 Champ Rugby.

23 May 2026
14:00

London Scottish (CR)	7 – 27	Blackheath (N1)
Try: Law 77' c Con: Bellamy 77'		Try: Hirskyj-Douglas 6' c Harding 13' c Hughes 29' c Con: Morley (3) 7', 13', 29'; Pen: Morley (2) 44', 79'

Athletic Ground

- Blackheath are promoted while London Scottish are relegated.

=== National 2 Promotion Play-offs ===
The club that finished 11th in National League 1 would contest a playoff with the runners up of National League 2 East, National League 2 North and National League 2 West, with the National 1 club playing the National 2 club with the poorest league record and the other National League 2 clubs playing each other. Home advantage was given first to the highest league level and then the better league record.

9th May 2026
15:00

Birmingham Moseley (N1)	60 – 15	Luctonians (N2W)

Billesley Common
Attendance: 1,192
Referee: George Ounsley

9th May 2026
15:00

Tynedale (N2N)	20 – 29	Oundle (N2E)

Tynedale Park
Attendance: 820
Referee: Samuel Yates

=== National 1 Accession Final ===
The winners of the National 2 Promotion play-offs would face one another to decide who would be the final side to make up the 2026–27 National League 1.

16th May 2026
15:00

Birmingham Moseley (N1)	19 – 15	Oundle (N2E)

Billesley Common
Attendance: 1,113
Referee: Ben Simpson

- Birmingham Moseley remain in National League 1.

== Attendances ==
- Does not include promotion/relegation play-offs.

Club	Home Games	Total	Average	Highest	Lowest	% Capacity
Birmingham Moseley	13	8,739	672	1,108	303	13%
Bishop's Stortford	13	6,929	533	1,074	302	33%
Blackheath	13	8,106	624	1,047	310	38%
Clifton	13	6,221	479	995	258	22%
Ding's Crusaders	13	5,966	459	802	281	20%
Leeds Tykes	13	6,092	469	1,024	284	26%
Leicester Lions	13	3,662	282	456	185	14%
Plymouth Albion	13	28,957	2,227	4,631	1,419	26%
Rams	13	10,637	818	1,054	614	41%
Rosslyn Park	13	8,444	650	1,000	249	32%
Rotherham Titans	13	10,110	778	1,582	326	31%
Sale FC	13	10,794	830	1,140	701	25%
Sedgley Park	13	5,009	385	773	298	13%
Tonbridge Juddians	13	3,569	275	521	121	20%

== Individual statistics ==
- Does not include promotion/relegation play-offs.

=== Top points scorers ===
Rank	Player	Team	Points
1	Richard Hayes	Rotherham Titans	328
2	Billy Harding	Blackheath	240
3	Iwan Jenkins	Plymouth Albion	203
4	Connor Lloyd	Tonbridge Juddians	197
5	Michael Cooke	Rams	153
6	Joseph Green	Sale FC	150
7	Edward Crossland	Leeds Tykes	143
8	Luke Bouchier	Leicester Lions	137
9	Oliver Glasse	Sedgley Park	135
10	Christopher Bolton	Bishop's Stortford	126

=== Top try scorers ===
Rank	Player	Team	Tries
1	Billy Harding	Blackheath	48
2	Luke Mehson	Rosslyn Park	25
3	Jackson Barling	Rotherham Titans	24
4	Curtis Barnes	Tonbridge Juddians	22
5	Thomas Kendrick	Tonbridge Juddians	20
6	Max Hayman	Rams	18
6	Harry Rowson	Dings Crusaders	18
7	Jake Morris	Bishops' Stortford	17
7	Charlie Walker	Rosslyn Park	17
7	Robert Wigginton	Plymouth Albion	17

== See also ==
- 2025–26 Champ Rugby
- 2025–26 National League 2 East
- 2025–26 National League 2 North
- 2025–26 National League 2 West
