= 2026–27 Champ Rugby =

Rugby union competition in England

- Countries: England

The 2026–27 Champ Rugby is the eighteenth season of Champ Rugby, the second tier of rugby union in England. It is the second season under the rebranded banner of Champ Rugby. The number of teams in the league remains at fourteen and the defending champions, Worcester Warriors, were not promoted to the PREM.

Ahead of the new campaign, Rotherham Titans and Blackheath were promoted from the 2025–26 National League 1. Rotherham secured their place automatically as National League 1 champions, while Blackheath earned promotion by winning the Champ Accession Final. They replace London Scottish and Cambridge, who were both relegated to the third tier. Cambridge were automatically relegated by finishing bottom of the table, whereas London Scottish were relegated after being defeated by Blackheath in the play-offs.

== Structure ==
The fourteen teams play each of the other teams twice, once at home and once away from home.

Champ Rugby, for the first time, is using a different bonus points system from that used last season and in most other rugby competitions. It is similar to the system used in France's Top 14 competion.

The results of the matches contribute points to the league table as follows:

- 4 points are awarded for a win
- 2 points are awarded for a draw
- 0 points are awarded for a loss
  - 1 losing (bonus) point is awarded to a team that loses a match by 7 points or fewer
  - 1 bonus point is awarded for scoring at least three tries more than the opponent in a match.

=== Play-offs and relegation ===
1st–6th place
The top six sides, after the regular season, enter the play-off phase to determine the league champions. The teams that finish in first and second place in the regular season will earn automatic home semi-final places. The 3rd–6th placed teams in the league play in the quarter-finals with the winners playing in the semi-finals. The eventual champions will then face the bottom placed team in the 2025–26 Premiership for a chance at promotion to the top tier.

12th & 13th
The teams placed 12th and 13th in the table face each other in single-leg play-off, the loser playing the runner-up in 2025–26 National League 1. The eventual winner will be in Champ Rugby for the 2027–28 season.

14th
The bottom placed side is automatically relegated to National League 1 for the 2027–28 season. They are replaced by the National League 1 champions.

== Participating teams and location ==
Fourteen teams complete in the league – twelve of the teams from last season plus Rotherham Titans, the champions of National League One, and Blackheath, the Champ accession play-off winner. No team was promoted to the Premiership. Departing were Cambridge (14th) and London Scottish (13th / Champ accession play-off losers) both relegated to National League One.

Club	Stadium	Capacity	Area	Previous season
Ampthill	Dillingham Park	3,000	Ampthill, Bedfordshire	10th
Bedford Blues	Goldington Road	5,531 (1,700 seats) (Note: Goldington Road capacity up from 5,000 to 5,531 for the 2025–26 season with capacity crowd achieved versus Richmond on 26 December 2025.)	Bedford, Bedfordshire	2nd (lost play-off final)
Blackheath	Well Hall	1,650 (550 seats)	Eltham, London	Promoted from National 1 (play-off winners) / 2nd
Caldy	Paton Field	4,000	Thurstaston, Wirral, Merseyside	11th
Chinnor	Kingsey Road	3,000 (560 seats) (Note: Chinnor upgraded their temporary 350 seater stand to a permanent grandstand containing 560 seats ahead of the 2025–26 season. Ground capacity was also adjusted to 3,000.)	Thame, Oxfordshire	5th (lost play-off QF)
Cornish Pirates	Mennaye Field	4,000 (2,200 seats)	Penzance, Cornwall	7th
Coventry	Butts Park Arena	5,250 (3,000 seats)	Coventry, West Midlands	3rd
Doncaster Knights	Castle Park	5,183 (1,926 seats)	Doncaster, South Yorkshire	8th
Ealing Trailfinders	Trailfinders Sports Ground	5,000 (2,115 seats)	West Ealing, London	1st (lost play-off SF)
Hartpury University	Hartpury Stadium	2,000	Hartpury, Gloucestershire	6th (lost play-off QF)
Nottingham	Lady Bay Sports Ground	3,700	Nottingham, Nottinghamshire	9th
Richmond	Athletic Ground	4,500 (1,000 seats)	Richmond, London	12th
Rotherham Titans	Clifton Lane	3,750	Rotherham, South Yorkshire	Promoted from National 1 (champions)
Worcester Warriors	Sixways Stadium	9,800	Worcester	Champions (won play-off final) / 4th

Locations of the 2026–27 Champ Rugby teams
2026–27 Greater London Champ Rugby clubs

== Table ==
2026–27 Champ Rugby table
Pos	Team	Pld	W	D	L	PF	PA	PD	TF	TA	TB	LB	Pts	Qualification
1	Ealing Trailfinders	9	8	0	1	412	221	+191	65	34	6	1	39	Play-off semi-finals
2	Worcester Warriors	9	7	0	2	403	226	+177	62	33	5	0	33	Play-off semi-finals
3	Coventry	9	7	0	2	420	289	+131	62	44	3	2	33	Play-off quarter-finals
4	Bedford Blues	9	6	0	3	335	263	+72	51	39	6	1	31	Play-off quarter-finals
5	Cornish Pirates	9	6	0	3	343	288	+55	52	43	4	0	28	Play-off quarter-finals
6	Rotherham Titans	9	6	0	3	269	301	−32	41	45	2	1	27	Play-off quarter-finals
7	Chinnor	9	6	0	3	282	271	+11	44	42	2	0	26	
8	Doncaster Knights	9	4	0	5	285	284	+1	42	42	2	2	20	
9	Ampthill	9	4	0	5	279	394	−115	43	60	0	0	16	
10	Hartpury	9	3	0	6	229	335	−106	34	51	1	1	14	
11	Richmond	9	3	0	6	233	308	−75	35	49	0	1	13	
12	Nottingham	9	1	0	8	222	314	−92	33	48	0	5	9	Relegation play-off
13	Caldy	9	1	0	8	257	377	−120	39	58	0	4	8	Relegation play-off
14	Blackheath	9	1	0	8	229	327	−98	32	48	0	3	7	Relegated

Updated to match(es) played on 22 November 2026. Source:
Rules for classification: If teams are level at any stage, tiebreakers are applied in the following order:
1. Number of matches won
2. Number of matches drawn
3. Difference between points for and against
4. Total number of points for
5. Aggregate number of points scored in matches between tied teams
6. Number of matches won excluding the first match, then the second and so on until the tie is settled

== Fixtures & results ==
=== Round 1 ===
18 September 2026
19:45

Nottingham	38 – 31	Blackheath (1 BP)

Lady Bay Sports Ground
Attendance: 1300
Referee: Henry Pearson

19 September 2026
15:00

(1 BP) Caldy	40 – 42	Hartpury

Paton Field
Attendance: 1621
Referee: Ian Tempest

19 September 2026
15:00

Rotherham Titans	38 – 35	Coventry (1 BP)

Clifton Lane
Attendance: 750
Referee: Anthony Woodthorpe

19 September 2026
15:00

(1 BP) Worcester Warriors	40 – 5	Bedford Blues

Sixways Stadium
Attendance: 5897
Referee: Craig Maxwell-Keys

19 September 2026
17:00

Chinnor	26 – 43	Ealing Trailfinders

Kingsey Road
Attendance: 1,638
Referee: Harry Walbaum

19 September 2026
17:00

(1 BP) Richmond	40 – 42	Ampthill

Athletic Ground
Attendance: 1052
Referee: Hamish Grant

20 September 2026
16:00

(1 BP) Cornish Pirates	45 – 19	Doncaster Knights

Mennaye Field

=== Round 2 ===
25 September 2026
19:45

(1 BP) Blackheath	24 – 28	Caldy

Well Hall
Attendance: 700
Referee: Ben Simpson

26 September 2026
13:00

(1 BP) Worcester Warriors	78 – 12	Rotherham Titans

Sixways Stadium
Attendance: 6,512
Referee: Jamie Par

26 September 2026
15:00

Ampthill	33 – 28	Nottingham (1 BP)

Dillingham Park
Referee: Charles Gayther

26 September 2026
15:00

Bedford Blues	33 – 52	Chinnor (1 BP)

Goldington Road
Attendance: 2,352
Referee: Ben Wood

26 September 2026
15:00

(1 BP) Coventry	73 – 40	Cornish Pirates

Butts Park Arena
Attendance: 2,621
Referee: Andy Wigley

27 September 2026
14:00

Doncaster Knights	29 – 15	Hartpury

Castle Park

27 September 2026
14:00

(1 BP) Ealing Trailfinders	36 – 19	Richmond

Trailfinders Sports Ground

=== Round 6 ===
30 October 2026
19:45

Chinnor	21 – 17	Nottingham (1 BP)

Kingsey Road
Attendance: 2,100
Referee: Hamish Grant

30 October 2026
19:45

Worcester Warriors	31 – 19	Blackheath

Sixways Stadium
Attendance: 5,500
Referee: Henry Pearson

31 October 2026
13:00

Coventry	35 – 17	Ampthill

Butts Park Arena
Attendance: 2,397
Referee: Jamie Parr

31 October 2026
15:00

(1 BP) Bedford Blues	45 – 21	Hartpury

Goldington Road
Attendance: 2,491
Referee: George Selwood

31 October 2026
15:00

(1 BP) Ealing Trailfinders	45 – 26	Doncaster Knights

Trailfinders Sports Ground
Attendance: 1,375
Referee: Richard Gordon

31 October 2026
15:00

Richmond	35 – 29	Caldy (1 BP)

Athletic Ground
Attendance: 871
Referee: Ben Wood

1 November 2026
16:00

Rotherham Titans	21 – 40	Cornish Pirates (1 BP)

Clifton Lane
Referee: Charlie Gayther

=== Round 7 ===
6 November 2026
19:45

(1 BP) Nottingham	24 – 28	Rotherham Titans

Lady Bay Sports Ground
Attendance: 1,807
Referee: Alex Thomas

7 November 2026
13:00

Ampthill	19 – 50	Ealing Trailfinders (1 BP)

StoneX Stadium (Note: The match was the first of a triple-header at StoneX Stadium)
Attendance: 2,500
Referee: Harry Walbaum

7 November 2026
13:00

Caldy	15 – 43	Coventry (1 BP)

Paton Field
Attendance: 1,267
Referee: Richard Gordon

7 November 2026
15:00

Blackheath	27 – 40	Bedford Blues (1 BP)

Well Hall
Attendance: 928
Referee: Craig Maxwell-Keys

7 November 2026
15:00

Cornish Pirates	19 – 33	Richmond

Mennaye Field
Attendance: 1,877
Referee: Holly Wood

7 November 2026
15:00

Doncaster Knights	36 – 27	Worcester Warriors

Castle Park
Attendance: 1,733
Referee: Jonathan Cook

8 November 2026
13:00

Hartpury	12 – 36	Chinnor (1 BP)

Hartpury Stadium
Referee: Jamie Parr

=== Round 8 ===
13 November 2026
19:45

(1 BP) Bedford Blues	48 – 26	Doncaster Knights

Goldington Road
Attendance: 2,988
Referee: Joe James

14 November 2026
13:00

(1 BP) Cornish Pirates	64 – 14	Cadly

Mennaye Field
Attendance: 1,613
Referee: Benjamin Wood

14 November 2026
13:00

Richmond	21 – 20	Nottingham (1 BP)

Athletic Ground
Attendance: 904
Referee: Koki Yamauchi

14 November 2026
15:00

Chinnor	33 – 23	Blackheath

Kingsey Road
Attendance: 1,975
Referee: Richard Gordon

14 November 2026
15:00

(1 BP) Rotherham Titans	26 – 32	Hartpury

Clifton Lane
Attendance: 737
Referee: Matt Sharpe

15 November 2026
14:00

Ealing Trailfinders	44 – 42	Coventry (1 BP)

Trailfinders Sports Ground

15 November 2026
15:00

(1 BP) Worcester Warriors	57 – 19	Ampthill

Sixways Stadium

=== Round 9 ===
21 November 2026
12:00

Ampthill	31 – 59	Bedford Blues (1 BP)

Dillingham Park
Attendance: 2,206
Referee: Koki Yamauchi

21 November 2026
13:00

(1 BP) Caldy	25 – 31	Ealing Trailfinders

Paton Field
Attendance: 1,145
Referee: Mike Lamb

21 November 2026
15:00

Blackheath	14 – 34	Rotherham Titans (1 BP)

Well Hall
Attendance: 420
Referee: Alex Thomas

21 November 2026
15:00

Coventry	57 – 42	Worcester Warriors

Butts Park Arena
Attendance: 2,908
Referee: Luke Pearce

21 November 2026
15:00

(1 BP) Hartpury	48 – 21	Richmond

Hartpury Stadium
Attendance: 740
Referee: Andrew Wigley

21 November 2026
17:00

(1 BP) Doncaster Knights	36 – 12	Chinnor

Castle Park
Attendance: 1,326
Referee: Matthew Sharpe

22 November 2026
16:00

(1 BP) Nottingham	33 – 38	Cornish Pirates

Lady Bay Sports Ground
Referee: Hamish Grant
