= Sheffield RUFC =

English rugby union club, based in South Yorkshire

(England) Sheffield
- Full name: Sheffield Rugby Union Football Club
- Union: Yorkshire RFU
- Nickname: Sheff
- Founded: 1902; 124 years ago
- Location: Dore, Sheffield, South Yorkshire, England
- Ground: Abbeydale Park (Capacity: 3,300 (100 seats))
- Chairman: Andrew Langdale
- President: Nick Crapper
- Coach(es): Anthony Posa (Head Coach), Dominic Paraons (Forwards Coach), and Ianto Jones (Scrum Coach)
- Captain: Ben Whitney
- League: National League 1
Team kit

Official website
- sheffieldrufc.co.uk

Sheffield Rugby Union Football Club is a rugby union club based at Abbeydale Sports Club in Sheffield, South Yorkshire, England. The club play in National League 1, the third level of the English rugby union system, following promotion from the National League 2 North at the end of the 2025–26 season, and following a decision in 2026 to introduce 2XVs into the league structure, Sheffield's 2nd XV entered Counties 2 Yorkshire B division and its 3rd XV will play in Counties 4 Yorkshire C Division.

== History ==
Records show that rugby football was being played in the City of Sheffield as long ago as the early 1860s indeed four Sheffield players represented Yorkshire in the first eve hir recorded county match against Lancashire in 1869. Officially Sheffield Rugby Union Football Club was founded in 1902 and subsequently found a permanent home at Abbey Dale Park, Dore in 1920 where it has three senior pitches.

Over the years Sheffield Ruff has enjoyed mixed fortunes, existing as it does, in a city focussed primarily upon soccer, but its most competitive seasons were in the late 1970s into the early years of the centennial that heralded the advent of the professional era. During this time the club was proud to be numbered within the vanguard of senior clubs playing at the highest level, initially as a member of the Northern Merit Tables and ultimately the National Leagues.

Sheffield RUFC has a long history of promoting rugby union at all levels, including establishing a youth section following the Second World War and one of the first colts teams in Yorkshire.

The onset of the professional era and the demise of school sport within the city led to a decline in the fortunes of the first team and subsequently demotion from National League status in 2004.

=== Early years ===
The first match to be played on the new ground was a win against Leicester Westleigh. 1952 saw the 50th anniversary of the club and the Golden Jubilee with matches against a Yorkshire XV and Plymouth Albion to celebrate; Sheffield winning both.

=== 1970s ===
It was the 1970s that saw Rugby Union change quite dramatically and with it Sheffield RUFC. The change from friendlies to a competitive structure was the forerunner to the League system. The 1970s saw notable players including Alan Old, Bill Reichwald and Michael Stuart. Players including Brian Firth, George Kirkpatrick, Steve Newsome, Mike Gange, Chris Sharpe and John Cowell playing for the club and winning both county and national honours. Sheffield also qualified for the Northern Merit Table, playing the North's elite clubs.

=== 1980s ===
The 1980s saw a great deal of re-building after retirements and players moving away from Sheffield but home grown talent continued to flourish. Players such as Miles Pierce, Michael Stuart, David Holmes, Robin Goodliffe, Nick Crapper and Simon Mugford were active in this period. 1981 saw a memorable highlight in the trip of Sheffield RUFC to play Swansea at St Helens ground, with nine internationals in their side.

=== 1990s ===
The 1990s saw Sheffield captained still by Bill Reichwald and included Doncaster trio Dave, (The Badger) Bosworth, Andy Gough and Alistair Challoner and Kerry Morley, Dave Fairclough, Ian Wright, Dave Watson and Rob Parr, amongst others and playing the likes of Nuneaton, Lydney, Redruth, Sale and Askeans as well as all of our Yorkshire rival clubs and the odd friendly against sides such as Wharfedale and Rotherham. 1990 also saw the Sheffield side make it through to the final of the Yorkshire Cup, losing to Wakefield 23–3. This decade also saw the changing face of Sheffield Rugby as both the pitch and stand were rebuilt.

== Club awards ==
The club achieved the RFU Seal of Approval in October 2007.

The club's history states a firm commitment to the true values of rugby union, and these have also been seen through recent awards of being the first club in Yorkshire to receive the Referees ‘Fair Play & Pleasure to Referee’ awards for both its senior and youth sections in season 2011–12.

More recently the club has been awarded two National ‘President XV awards for its efforts in both coaching, and player retention, in season 2012–13.

== Colours ==
Home: the traditional colours are a royal blue and white hoops shirt, navy blue shorts and red socks with white and blue hoops. For the 2019/2020 season Sheffield will be wearing light blue and navy blue hoops, with navy blue shorts and plain red socks to celebrate the centenary of playing at Abbeydale Park.

Away: red shirt with navy blue shorts and red socks with white and blue hoops.

== Men's seniors ==
Sheffield RUFC currently have four senior teams and a sevens team.

=== Season 2012–13 ===
- The 1st XV played in North East One and were unlucky not to get a play-off spot this season 2012–13, and have improved their position in all of the last three seasons.
- the 2nd XV played their first season in the Yorkshire Merit League Premiership ( finishing 3rd ) after gaining promotion the year before.
- the 3rd XV had a strong season and showed the strength in depth of Sheffield Rugby Club by winning the South District League 2, and gaining promotion. There was a re-structuring of the leagues in season 2013–14, so the 3rd team while being promoted, played in the newly formed, Western Championship. ( which is one league below the 2nd team)
- the 4th team, has traditionally been a ‘fun’ team, playing occasional games, generally for the ‘older’ players who simply just want to turn out and play. They play in the South District Merit league 1.

== Sheffield Ladies ==
Sheffield Ladies RUFC was established in 1996 and has successfully competed within the National Leagues and providing numerous County representative players as well as a recent England International player. Club maintains a formal partnership with the Sheffield Universities, this has led players to adjoin at any level of rugby, including obtaining coaching and refereeing qualifications.

Sheffield Ladies have competed in North 2 for many years always finishing in the top part of the table, finishing 2nd in season 2012–13, and having only lost 1 game all season. Sheffield has supported Emily Braun in her early days before she gained her first England caps in the 6 nations in 2010. Sheffield Ladies has had many girls represent Yorkshire with Charlotte Evans captaining them for 2 years, Charlotte has also represented North of England for 3 years and has been an England trials. Sheffield Ladies is a section which helps girls develop in any aspect of rugby they wish. They have good links with the Sheffield Hallam and Sheffield University ladies by giving players the opportunity to train and potentially play for Yorkshire County and Divisional sides. The club also supports interested players in gaining rugby coaching and refereeing qualifications. In season 2012–13 Andrea Dobson, was capped for the National side at Rugby League.

== Coaching ==
A professional approach to coaching and education is maintained with over sixty-five Rugby Ready and over 60 coaches qualified to RFU Levels 1 or 2

== Age Grade ==
The ‘Age Grade’ ( previously Mini & Junior ) Rugby Section, was established in the mid 1940s and boasted one of the first Colts (U19’s) teams in Yorkshire. Slowly over the years the club has expanded and developed its membership base in its Mini (U7-U12), Junior (U13-U16), &Colts (U17’s and U19’s). The steady growth has ensured that Sheffield have fielded a side in every Age since the mid 1980s, and this was further helped and maintained following the momentum of England’s World Cup win in 2003, this influx is expected again come the World Cup in England in 2015. From 2003 through to 2013, the playing membership has grown from 125, to now over 350 Children. (The largest Age grade section, in the North of England.) Regularly Sheffield provides at least 3 to 4 Semi-Finalists, and nearly always at least 1 winning side in the prestigious Yorkshire Cup, competitions. Over the past 10 years, 9 of the Senior Colts sides have competed very well in the Premier league, and nearly always finishing in the top 4.

Some of the young players have achieved representative honours and during the last season over thirty players were selected to represent their district (South Yorkshire) and above (County). Sheffield RUFC is committed to continuing and improving its Mini and Junior Section and will continue to see home players progress into representation within the four senior teams and beyond.

== Juniors and Minis ==
Sheffield RUFC provide rugby union at every level.

=== Boys ===
SRUFC have a boys team at every level from under 7s to under 17s. Many of the boys go on to represent county and above at their respective age groups. Once junior level has finished most will move on to the Colts or one of the senior teams.

== Club records list ==
Most wins in a season 30 / 1969–70

Most points in a season 995 / 2002–03

Most tries in a season 140 / 2002–03

Most points in a game 92 v Scarborough 2002–03

Most points against in a game 83 v Coventry 1997–98

Biggest win 92–5 v Scarborough 2002–03

Biggest defeat 0–66 v Headlingley 1922–23

Longest winning run 19 games / 1965–66

Longest losing run 17 games / 2004–05

== Current standings ==
2026–27 National League 1 table
Pos	Team	Pld	W	D	L	PF	PA	PD	TB	LB	Pts	Qualification
1	Plymouth Albion	7	7	0	0	382	90	+292	7	0	35	Promotion place
2	Tonbridge Juddians	7	7	0	0	301	254	+47	7	0	35	Promotion play-off
3	Camborne	7	6	0	1	255	199	+56	6	0	30	Promotion play-off
4	Leeds Tykes	7	4	0	3	255	187	+68	5	3	24	
5	Sale FC	7	4	0	3	281	205	+76	5	2	23	
6	Bishop's Stortford	7	3	0	4	247	242	+5	6	2	20	
7	Rosslyn Park	7	3	0	4	235	252	−17	6	1	19	
8	London Scottish	7	3	0	4	243	277	−34	5	1	18	
9	Birmingham Moseley	7	3	0	4	195	253	−58	5	1	18	
10	Bury St Edmunds	7	3	0	4	196	271	−75	5	0	17	
11	Rams	7	2	1	4	175	233	−58	5	1	16	Relegation play-off
12	Sheffield	7	2	0	5	171	242	−71	5	2	15	Relegation place
13	Dings Crusaders	7	1	1	5	250	298	−48	6	3	15	Relegation place
14	Cambridge	7	0	0	7	197	380	−183	5	3	8	Relegation place

Updated to match(es) played on 17 October 2026. Source: National League Rugby
Rules for classification: If teams are level at any stage, tiebreakers are applied in the following order:
1. Number of matches won
2. Number of matches drawn
3. Difference between points for and against
4. Total number of points for
5. Aggregate number of points scored in matches between tied teams
6. Number of matches won excluding the first match, then the second and so on until the tie is settled

== Ground ==
Sheffield RUFC are based at Abbeydale Park in Dore, a village that forms part of the southern suburbs of Sheffield. Positioned on the outskirts of the city, the ground benefits from good transport links and the Dore and Totley railway station is a few minutes walk away. The club has been based at Abbeydale Park since 1919, having previously played at grounds in Sandygate and Tinsley.

The ground is part of a greater sports complex which has facilities for cricket, hockey, tennis, and a multitude of other sports as well as rugby union. Facilities at the rugby ground include a large club-house and bar, several pitches including a main pitch with grand-stand, while floodlights enable matches to be played throughout the winter months. There is a choice of two car parks at the complex, although it can get very full during the season.

In terms of capacity, the rugby ground has space for around 3,200 spectators, including 224 seated in the stand. The ground was host to Rotherham Titans' semi-final play-off games in the RFU Championship in 2014 and 2015 and saw attendances of 3,267 and 3,227 respectively. Sheffield recorded an attendance of 1,820 against city rivals Sheffield Tigers in their National League 2 North game on 23 December 2017.

== Honours ==
- North 1 (east v west) promotion play-off winner: 2002–03, 2014–15
- Durham/Northumberland 1 v Yorkshire 1 promotion play-off winner: 2010–11
- National League 3 (north v midlands) promotion play-off winner: 2016–17
- Midlands Premier (tier 5): Regional 1 Midlands
- National League 2 North champions (tier 4): 2025–26
