= Abbeydale Park =

Sports venue in Dore, South Yorkshire, England

Abbeydale Stadium
- Interactive map of Abbeydale Stadium
- Location: Dore, South Yorkshire, England
- Coordinates: 53°19′35″N 1°31′14″W
- Capacity: 3,300 (100 seats)

Construction
- Opened: 1921; 105 years ago

Tenants
- Sheffield Collegiate Cricket Club; Sheffield RUFC; Sheffield F.C. (1921–1988); Derbyshire County Cricket Club (1946–1947); Yorkshire County Cricket Club (1974–1996)

Abbeydale Park is a sports venue in Dore, South Yorkshire, England. It is unusual in having hosted home games for two different county cricket teams.

== History ==
The Park first opened for cricket in 1921, with the first pavilion being completed the following year. Its first tenant was the Sheffield Collegiate Cricket Club. The ground was in Derbyshire until the county boundary was redrawn in 1934, and Derbyshire County Cricket Club played two first-class matches there in 1946 and 1947.

With the closure of Bramall Lane to cricket, Yorkshire County Cricket Club began playing at the venue in 1974, and continued regular matches until 1996. In 2007, the club returned to the ground for some second team games.

In addition to cricket, football was also played at the Park, with Sheffield F.C., the oldest football club in the world, playing there from September 1921 until 1988. Argentina and Switzerland both trained at the ground during the 1966 World Cup.

The park is now home to a variety of sports, including squash, hockey, badminton, table tennis, racketball, bowls, and rugby in addition to cricket.

== Rugby ground ==
Abbeydale Park is home to Sheffield RUFC (formed 1902) who have been based in the area since 1919. The rugby club are situated in the southern half of the complex and share their facilities with the cricket teams. Facilities include a large club-house and bar, pitches for both cricket and rugby union, a stand and floodlights to ensure matches can be played throughout the winter. There is also a choice of two car parks at the complex.

In the 1990s the ground capacity was listed as 1,100 with 100 seated in the stand. This now seems very conversative and is more likely to be around 3,300 (100 seated), with larger crowds achieved when Rotherham Titans used the ground for RFU Championship semi-final play-off games in 2014 and 2015 and saw attendances of 3,267 and 3,227 respectively. In recent years Sheffield achieved an attendance of 1,820 for their derby game in National League 2 North against city rivals Sheffield Tigers on 23 December 2017.

== Sheffield Collegiate Cricket Club ==
Sheffield Collegiate Cricket Club have been playing cricket at Abbeydale Park since 1921. The cricket club was a mainstay of the Yorkshire Cricket League before its dissolution in 2014; it has since played in the Yorkshire South Premier League. The club is notable for producing two England Cricket captains, Joe Root and Michael Vaughan.
