= Billesley Common =

Rugby union venue in Birmingham, England

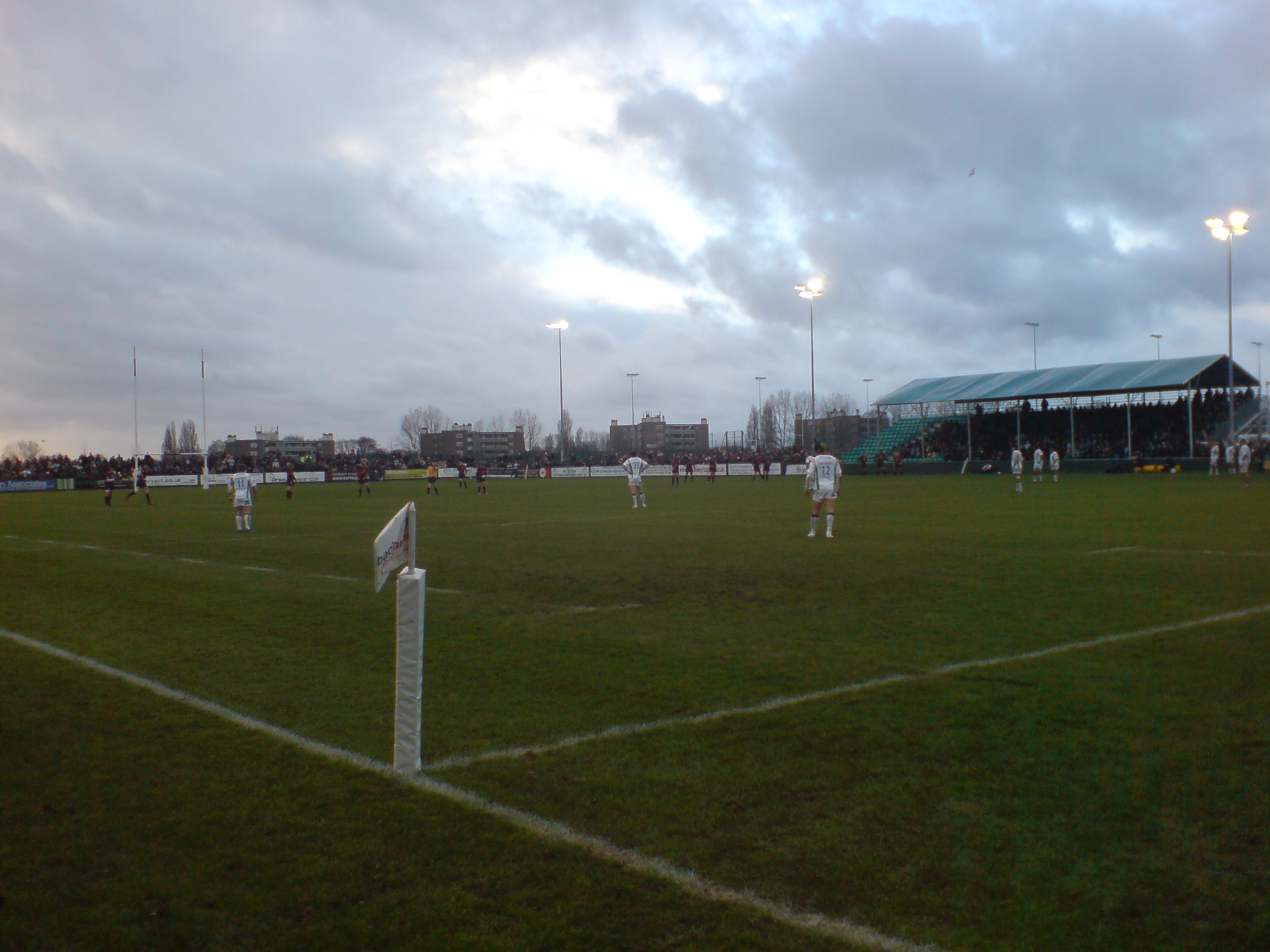
- Moseley v Northampton (December 2007)
- Interactive map of Billesley Common
- Location: Birmingham, England
- Coordinates: 52.422°N 1.880°W
- Owner: Birmingham City Council
- Capacity: 5,000 (1,300 seated)
- Surface: Grass + 3G all-weather training pitch

Construction
- Groundbreaking: 2005
- Built: 2005
- Expanded: 2014/15

Tenants
- Birmingham Moseley RFC (2005–present), Moseley Oak RFC (2008–present), Birmingham Bulldogs RLFC (2016–present)

Billesley Common is a recreational area of public open space in South Birmingham, England. It is situated along the Yardley Wood Road, between the suburbs of Moseley and Yardley Wood.

Birmingham's rugby union team, Birmingham Moseley Rugby Club of the National League 1 lease part of the common from Birmingham City Council for their pitches and clubhouse. The ground had a seating capacity of 1,450 in the original stand which was replaced by a 5,000 seat stand and clubhouse. Birmingham Moseley's sister club Moseley Oak (formally Selly Oak RFC) have played at Billesley Common since 2008. In 2016, Birmingham Bulldogs announced that they would play their home games at the common.

Billesley Common was first mentioned in 1774 as being 'common wasteland'.

During the 1960s, Billesley Common was home to the Birmingham Medics RFC.

== Bibliography ==
- Victor Skipp (1987). The History of Greater Birmingham - down to 1830. V. H. T. Skipp. ISBN 0-9506998-0-2.
