= Graham Law =

English rugby league footballer

Personal information
- Full name: Graham Law
- Born: 24 July 1979 (age 46); Sheffield, Yorkshire, England

Playing information
- Position: Centre, Stand-off, Second-row, Loose forward
Club
Years	Team	Pld	T	G	FG	P
1997–02	Wakefield Trinity (Wildcats)	83	7	42	0	112
- Relatives: Neil Law (brother)

Graham Law is a former professional rugby league footballer who played in the 1990s and 2000s. He played at club level for Wakefield Trinity (Wildcats), as a centre, stand-off, second-row, or loose forward.

== Genealogical Information ==
Graham Law is the brother of the rugby union, and rugby league footballer; Neil Law.
