= Neil Law =

English rugby union & league footballer

Personal information
- Full name: Neil Law
- Born: 23 October 1974 (age 51) Sheffield, England

Playing information

Rugby union
Club
| Years | Team | Pld | T | G | FG | P |
|---|---|---|---|---|---|---|
| | Northampton Saints |
| | Otley |
| | Total | 0 | 0 | 0 | 0 | 0 |

Rugby league
- Position: Fullback, Wing, Centre
Club
| Years | Team | Pld | T | G | FG | P |
|---|---|---|---|---|---|---|
| 1998–99 | Sheffield Eagles | 2 | 1 | 0 | 0 | 4 |
| 1999–02 | Wakefield Trinity Wildcats | 91 | 44 | 1 | 0 | 178 |
| 2003–06 | York City Knights | 56 | 36 | 0 | 0 | 144 |
| 2007 | Sheffield Eagles | 9 | 4 | 0 | 0 | 16 |
| | Total | 158 | 85 | 1 | 0 | 342 |
- Relatives: Graham Law (brother)

Neil Law (born 23 October 1974) is an English former rugby union, and professional rugby league footballer who played in the 1990s and 2000s. He played club level rugby union (RU) for Northampton Saints and Otley R.U.F.C., and club level rugby league (RL) for the Sheffield Eagles (both the original, and current Sheffield Eagles clubs), the Wakefield Trinity Wildcats, and the York City Knights, as a fullback, wing or centre.

== Background ==
Law was born in Sheffield, West Yorkshire, England.

== Rugby league career ==
Law played in the Super League for Sheffield Eagles in 1998, and the Wakefield Trinity Wildcats from 1999 until 2002, when he left the club by mutual consent.

Law joined the York City Knights in 2003, and scored 11 tries in 12 games before switching to rugby union. He returned to the York City Knights in 2005, scoring a further 25 tries in 44 appearances during the next two seasons. He returned to the Sheffield Eagles for one season in 2007, making nine appearances.

== Personal life ==
Neil Law is the brother of the rugby league footballer; Graham Law.
