= 2024–25 National League 2 West =

Rugby union competition in England

- Countries: England
- Date: 7 September 2024 – 26 April 2025
- Champions: Clifton (1st title)
- Runners-up: Camborne
- Relegated: Devonport, Bournville
- Matches played: 175
- Attendance: 87,176 (average 498 per match)
- Highest attendance: 2,846 – Camborne v Redruth, 21 December 2024
- Lowest attendance: 75 – Exeter Uni v Devonport, 21 December 2024
- Tries scored: 1601 (average 9.1 per match)
- Top point scorer: 247 – Kyle Moyle (Camborne)
- Top try scorer: 44 – Ben Priddey (Camborne)

The 2024–25 National League 2 West was the third season of the fourth-tier (west) of the English domestic rugby union competitions; one of three at this level. The others are National League 2 East and National League 2 North.

Clifton would finish as champions, 6 points clear of runners up Camborne, a 5 point victory at home on the last day of the season ensuring promotion to the 2025–26 National League 1, making a return to tier 3 for the first time since 1997. Although the title battle went to the very last game, in effect the turning point of the season was during 5 April 2025 when Clifton defeated Camborne 46 – 26 at home to become league leaders after having chased the Cornish side for the majority of the campaign. One consolation for Camborne would be that they would retain their rivalry with Redruth for the following season - with the two games between the Cornish teams attracting a combined attendance of 5,324 - easily the best attended in the division.

The reformation of the RFU Championship from 12 to 14 teams meant that one team per level would be safe from relegation. This made relegation more complex than normal but in the end both Devonport Services and Bournville went down on 5 April with two games still to play due to the results of National League 2 North sides making it impossible for either side to stay up - ultimately Billingham from the 2024–25 National League 2 North would remain in tier 4 as the best 13th placed side.

== Structure ==
The league consists of fourteen teams who play the others on a home and away basis, to make a total of 26 matches each. The champions are promoted to National League 1. The bottom two teams are relegated to Regional 1 Midlands or Regional 1 South West.

The results of the matches contribute points to the league as follows:

- 4 points are awarded for a win
- 2 points are awarded for a draw
- 0 points are awarded for a loss, however
- 1 losing (bonus) point is awarded to a team that loses a match by 7 points or fewer
- 1 additional (bonus) point is awarded to a team scoring 4 tries or more in a match.

Earlier in the season it had been indicated that the RFU Championship was due to increase from 12 to 14 teams for 2025–26. This was finally confirmed by the RFU with most of the season completed, and the subsequent league restructuring meant that one team per league level would have a reprieve from relegation, meaning that the best ranked 13th place team in National League 2 East, National League 2 North or National League 2 West would stay up at the end of 2024–25.

=== Participating teams and locations ===
Team	Ground	Capacity	City/Area	Previous season
Bournville	Avery Fields		Edgbaston, Birmingham, West Midlands	10th
Camborne	Recreation Ground	7,000 (780 seats)	Camborne, Cornwall	6th
Cinderford	Beavis Memorial Ground	2,500	Cinderford, Gloucestershire	Relegated from National League 1 (14th)
Clifton	Station Road	2,200 (200 seats)	Cribbs Causeway, Patchway, Bristol	3rd
Devonport Services	The Rectory Field	2,000	Devonport, Plymouth, Devon	Promoted from Regional 1 South West (champions)
Exeter University	Topsham Sports Ground		Exeter, Devon	5th
Hinckley	De Montfort Park	2,000	Hinckley, Leicestershire	7th
Hornets	The Nest, Hutton Moor Park	1,100 (100 stand)	Weston-super-Mare, Somerset	12th
Loughborough Students	East Park (Note: Since relegation from the 2018–19 National League 1 Loughborough Students have switched games from the Loughborough University Stadium to nearby East Park.)	1,000	Loughborough, Leicestershire	8th
Luctonians	Mortimer Park	2,500 (300 seats)	Kingsland, Herefordshire	2nd
Macclesfield	Priory Park	1,250 (250 seats)	Macclesfield, Cheshire	Promoted from Regional 1 North West (champions)
Old Redcliffians	Scotland Lane	1,000	Brislington, Bristol	4th
Redruth	Recreation Ground	3,500 (580 seats)	Redruth, Cornwall	9th
Taunton Titans	Veritas Park	2,000 (198 seats)	Taunton, Somerset	Relegated from National League 1 (13th)

Locations of the 2024–25 National League 2 West teams

== League table ==
2024–25 National League 2 West table
Pos	Team	Pld	W	D	L	PF	PA	PD	TB	LB	Pts	Qualification
1	Clifton (C)	26	21	1	4	942	623	+319	23	3	112	Promotion place
2	Camborne	26	20	1	5	1037	672	+365	23	0	105	
3	Taunton Titans	26	16	2	8	828	727	+101	18	3	89	
4	Loughborough Students	26	13	1	12	926	817	+109	24	5	83	
5	Luctonians	26	15	1	10	736	564	+172	13	4	79	
6	Hornets	26	13	1	12	789	830	−41	20	5	79	
7	Cinderford	26	14	1	11	779	708	+71	15	5	78	
8	Redruth	26	14	1	11	709	666	+43	16	3	77	
9	Hinckley	26	13	0	13	902	793	+109	15	5	72	
10	Old Redcliffians	26	11	1	14	714	805	−91	17	6	69	
11	Macclesfield	26	7	1	18	708	963	−255	17	7	54	
12	Exeter University	26	9	1	16	770	873	−103	13	2	53	
13	Bournville (R)	26	6	0	20	615	937	−322	11	6	41	Relegation place
14	Devonport Services (R)	26	4	0	22	569	1046	−477	14	4	34	Relegation place

Updated to match(es) played on 26 April 2025. Source: National League Rugby
Rules for classification: If teams are level at any stage, tiebreakers are applied in the following order:
1. Number of matches won
2. Number of matches drawn
3. Difference between points for and against
4. Total number of points for
5. Aggregate number of points scored in matches between tied teams
6. Number of matches won excluding the first match, then the second and so on until the tie is settled

== Fixtures & results ==
Fixtures for the season were published by the RFU on 31 May 2025.

=== Round 1 ===
7 September 2024
14:00

Exeter University	15 – 15	Clifton

Topsham Sport Ground
Attendance: 101
Referee: James Walker

7 September 2024
14:00

(1 BP) Hornets	27 – 29	Redruth (1 BP)

The Nest
Attendance: 200
Referee: Dan Parrott

7 September 2024
14:00

(1 BP) Loughborough Students	33 – 3	Taunton Titans

East Park
Attendance: 402
Referee: Ben Simpson

7 September 2024
14:30

(1 BP) Bournville	40 – 22	Devonport Services (1 BP)

Avery Fields
Attendance: 150
Referee: Callum Watson

7 September 2024
14:30

(1 BP) Camborne	52 – 25	Macclesfield (1 BP)

Recreation Ground
Attendance: 637
Referee: Tom Evans-Jones

7 September 2024
15:00

Hinckley	17 – 27	Luctonians

De Montfort Park
Attendance: 400
Referee: Nathan Howarth

7 September 2024
15:00

(1 BP) Old Redcliffians	38 – 31	Cinderford (2 BP)

Scotland Lane
Attendance: 250
Referee: Haydn Davies

=== Round 2 ===
14 September 2024
14:00

(1 BP) Loughborough Students	50 – 21	Hinckley

East Park
Attendance: 571
Referee: Peter Connor

14 September 2024
14:30

(1 BP) Clifton	36 – 28	Old Redcliffians (1 BP)

Station Road
Attendance: 315
Referee: James Milliner-Woodcock

14 September 2024
14:30

Devonport Services	19 – 59	Exeter University (1 BP)

The Rectory Field
Attendance: 300
Referee: Lloyd Davies

14 September 2024
14:30

(1 BP) Redruth	35 – 43	Camborne (1 BP)

Recreation Ground
Attendance: 2,478
Referee: Ben Simpson

14 September 2024
15:00

(1 BP) Cinderford	13 – 15	Luctonians

Beavis Memorial Ground
Attendance: 325
Referee: Dan Parrott

14 September 2024
15:00

(1 BP) Macclesfield	31 – 28	Bournville (2 BP)

Priory Park
Attendance: 250
Referee: Llyr ApGeraint-Roberts

14 September 2024
15:00

(1 BP) Taunton Titans	34 – 19	Hornets

Veritas Park
Attendance: 949
Referee: Callum Watson

=== Round 3 ===
21 September 2024
14:00

(1 BP) Exeter University	43 – 24	Macclesfield (1 BP)

Topsham Sports Ground
Attendance: 162
Referee: James Milliner-Woodcock

21 September 2024
14:30

(1 BP) Bournville	34 – 22	Redruth

Avery Fields
Attendance: 160
Referee: Nathan Howarth

21 September 2024
14:30

(1 BP) Camborne	58 – 25	Taunton Titans

Recreation Ground
Attendance: 735
Referee: James Walker

21 September 2024
15:00

(1 BP) Hinckley	17 – 19	Cinderford

De Montfort Park
Attendance: 450
Referee: Ben Simpson

21 September 2024
15:00

Hornets	20 – 32	Loughborough Students (1 BP)

The Nest
Attendance: 303
Referee: Holly Wood

21 September 2024
15:00

(1 BP) Luctonians	39 – 15	Clifton

Mortimer Park
Attendance: 423
Referee: Callum Watson

21 September 2024
15:00

(1 BP) Old Redcliffians	43 – 5	Devonport Services

Scotland Lane
Attendance: 235
Referee: Dan Parrott

=== Round 4 ===
28 September 2024
14:00

(1 BP) Loughborough Students	49 – 31	Camborne (1 BP)

East Park
Attendance: 652
Referee: Callum Watson

28 September 2024
14:30

(2 BP) Clifton	36 – 40	Cinderford (1 BP)

Station Road
Attendance: 250
Referee: Peter Connor

28 September 2024
14:30

Devonport Services	21 – 39	Luctonians (1 BP)

The Rectory Field
Attendance: 205
Referee: James Milliner-Woodcock

28 September 2024
15:00

(1 BP) Hornets	64 – 42	Hinckley (1 BP)

The Nest
Attendance: 426
Referee: James Walker

28 September 2024
15:00

(1 BP) Macclesfield	34 – 34	Old Redcliffians (1 BP)

Priory Park
Attendance: 233
Referee: Daniel Woods

28 September 2024
15:00

(1 BP) Redruth	45 – 30	Exeter University (1 BP)

Recreation Ground
Attendance: 719
Referee: Tom Evans-Jones

28 September 2024
15:00

(1 BP) Taunton Titans	27 – 20	Bournville (1 BP)

Veritas Park
Attendance: 656
Referee: Hayden Lloyd Davies

=== Round 5 ===
5 October 2024
14:00

Exeter University	21 – 42	Taunton Titans (1 BP)

Topsham Sports Ground
Attendance: 250
Referee: Ben Simpson

5 October 2024
14:30

(1 BP) Bournville	43 – 24	Loughborough Students (1 BP)

Avery Fields
Attendance: 220
Referee: James Walker

5 October 2024
14:30

(1 BP) Camborne	33 – 27	Hornets (2 BP)

Recreation Ground
Attendance: 781
Referee: James Milliner-Woodcock

5 October 2024
15:00

(1 BP) Cinderford	44 – 26	Devonport Services (1 BP)

Beavis Memorial Ground
Attendance: 298
Referee: Owen Taylor

5 October 2024
15:00

(1 BP) Hinckley	32 – 26	Clifton (2 BP)

De Montfort Park
Attendance: 450
Referee: Dan Parrott

5 October 2024
15:00

(1 BP) Luctonians	66 – 5	Macclesfield

Mortimer Park
Attendance: 441
Referee: Peter Connor

5 October 2024
15:00

(1 BP) Old Redcliffians	45 – 40	Redruth (2 BP)

Scotland Lane
Attendance: 375
Referee: Lloyd Davies

=== Round 6 ===
12 October 2024
14:00

(2 BP) Loughborough Students	26 – 28	Exeter University

East Park
Attendance: 446
Referee: Lloyd Davies

12 October 2024
14:30

(1 BP) Camborne	41 – 19	Hinckley

Recreation Ground
Attendance: 800
Referee: Nathan Howarth

12 October 2024
14:30

Devonport Services	17 – 52	Clifton (1 BP)

The Rectory Field
Attendance: 180
Referee: James Walker

12 October 2024
14:30

(1 BP) Redruth	38 – 29	Luctonians (1 BP)

Recreation Ground
Attendance: 658
Referee: James Milliner-Woodcock

12 October 2024
15:00

(1 BP) Hornets	27 – 21	Bournville (1 BP)

The Nest
Attendance: 350
Referee: Ben Simpson

12 October 2024
15:00

(1 BP) Macclesfield	19 – 24	Cinderford

Priory Park
Attendance: 245
Referee: Harry Parsons

12 October 2024
15:00

(1 BP) Taunton Titans	62 – 29	Old Redcliffians (1 BP)

Veritas Park
Attendance: 627 (Note: The Rugby Paper had the crowd at Taunton Titans home game against Old Redcliffians on 12 October 2024 listed at just 267. This is a incorrect - attendance was actually 627.)
Referee: Ben Wood

=== Round 7 ===
19 October 2024
14:00

(2 BP) Exeter University	33 – 37	Hornets (1 BP)

Topsham Sports Ground
Attendance: 250
Referee: James Walker

19 October 2024
14:30

Bournville	12 – 40	Camborne (1 BP)

Avery Fields
Attendance: 200
Referee: Dan Parrott

19 October 2024
14:30

(1 BP) Clifton	52 – 17	Macclesfield

Station Road
Attendance: 180
Referee: Haydn Davies

19 October 2024
15:00

Cinderford	23 – 19	Redruth (1 BP)

Beavis Memorial Ground
Attendance: 300
Referee: Peter Connor

19 October 2024
15:00

(1 BP) Hinckley	55 – 22	Devonport Services (1 BP)

De Montfort Park
Attendance: 450
Referee: Phil Russell

19 October 2024
15:00

Luctonians	12 – 23	Taunton Titans

Mortimer Park
Attendance: 672
Referee: Ben Simpson

19 October 2024
15:00

(1 BP) Old Redcliffians	49 – 38	Loughborough Students (1 BP)

Scotland Lane
Attendance: 225
Referee: Tom Evans-Jones

=== Round 8 ===
26 October 2024
14:00

(1 BP) Loughborough Students	36 – 36	Luctonians (1 BP)

East Park
Attendance: 427
Referee: James Walker

26 October 2024
14:30

Bournville	27 – 19	Hinckley

Avery Fields
Attendance: 200
Referee: Lloyd Davies

26 October 2024
14:30

(1 BP) Camborne	54 – 24	Exeter University

Recreation Ground
Attendance: 750
Referee: Ben Simpson

26 October 2024
14:30

(1 BP) Redruth	32 – 45	Clifton (1 BP)

Recreation Ground
Attendance: 628
Referee: Tom Evans-Jones

26 October 2024
15:00

(1 BP) Hornets	46 – 40	Old Redcliffians (2 BP)

The Nest
Attendance: 509
Referee: Callum Watson

26 October 2024
15:00

(1 BP) Macclesfield	47 – 35	Devonport Services (1 BP)

Priory Park
Attendance: 310
Referee: Llyr ApGeraint-Roberts

26 October 2024
15:00

(1 BP) Taunton Titans	28 – 17	Cinderford

Veritas Park
Attendance: 740
Referee: Dan Parrott

=== Round 9 ===
9 November 2024
14:00

(1 BP) Exeter University	34 – 31	Bournville (2 BP)

Topsham Sports Ground
Attendance: 100
Referee: James Milliner-Woodcock

9 November 2024
14:00

Old Redcliffians	19 – 57	Camborne (1 BP)

Scotland Lane
Attendance: 235
Referee: Peter Buchanan

9 November 2024
14:15

Luctonians	22 – 19	Hornets (1 BP)

Mortimer Park
Attendance: 398
Referee: Henry Pearson

9 November 2024
14:30

(1 BP) Clifton	33 – 26	Taunton Titans (2 BP)

Station Road
Attendance: 212
Referee: Tom Hurdley

9 November 2024
14:30

(1 BP) Devonport Services	27 – 23	Redruth (1 BP)

The Rectory Field
Attendance: 380
Referee: Ben Simpson

9 November 2024
15:00

(1 BP) Cinderford	50 – 24	Loughborough Students (1 BP)

Beavis Memorial Ground
Attendance: 252
Referee: LLoyd Davies

9 November 2024
15:00

(1 BP) Hinckley	62 – 21	Macclesfield

De Montfort Park
Attendance: 500
Referee: Jack Moorhouse

=== Round 10 ===
16 November 2024
14:00

(1 BP) Exeter University	31 – 41	Hinckley (1 BP)

Topsham Sports Ground
Attendance: 350
Referee: Callum Watson

16 November 2024
14:00

(2 BP) Loughborough Students	26 – 33	Clifton (1 BP)

East Park
Attendance: 501
Referee: Ben Simpson

16 November 2024
14:00

(1 BP) Redruth	34 – 19	Macclesfield

Recreation Ground
Attendance: 800
Referee: James Milliner-Woodcock

16 November 2024
14:30

Bournville	12 – 23	Old Redcliffians

Avery Fields
Attendance: 200
Referee: James Walker

16 November 2024
14:30

(1 BP) Camborne	29 – 22	Luctonians (1 BP)

Recreation Ground
Attendance: 841
Referee: Dan Parrott

16 November 2024
15:00

(1 BP) Hornets	29 – 29	Cinderford (1 BP)

The Nest
Attendance: 373
Referee: Nathan Howarth

16 November 2024
15:00

(1 BP) Taunton Titans	57 – 9	Devonport Services

Veritas Park
Attendance: 902
Referee: Tom Evans-Jones

=== Round 11 ===
23 November 2024
14:00

(1 BP) Old Redcliffians	26 – 12	Exeter University

Scotland Lane
Attendance: 195
Referee: Dan Parrott

23 November 2024
14:15

Hinckley	11 – 38	Redruth (1 BP)

De Montfort Park
Attendance: 600
Referee: Peter Connor

23 November 2024
14:15

Luctonians	13 – 6	Bournville (1 BP)

Mortimer Park
Attendance: 333
Referee: Ben Simpson

23 November 2024
14:30

(1 BP) Clifton	31 – 6	Hornets

Station Road
Attendance: 140
Referee: Lloyd Davies

23 November 2024
14:30

Devonport Services	17 – 0	Loughborough Students

The Rectory Field
Attendance: 224
Referee: James Miller-Woodcock

23 November 2024
15:00

Cinderford	P – P	Camborne

Beavis Memorial Ground

- Postponed due to waterlogged pitch. Game to be rescheduled for 30 November 2024.

23 November 2024
15:00

Macclesfield	P – P	Taunton Titans

Priory Park

- Postponed due to snow. Game to be rescheduled for 30 November 2024.

=== Round 11 (rescheduled games) ===
30 November 2024
15:00

(1 BP) Cinderford	43 – 24	Camborne (1 BP)

Beavis Memorial Ground
Attendance: 154
Referee: Callum Watson

- Game rescheduled from 23 November 2024.

30 November 2024
15:00

(1 BP) Macclesfield	33 – 55	Taunton Titans (1 BP)

Priory Park
Attendance: 212
Referee: Samuel Yates

- Game rescheduled from 23 November 2024.

=== Round 12 ===
7 December 2024
14:00

Exeter University	P – P	Luctonians

Topsham Sports Ground

- Game postponed due to high winds making travel unsafe. Game to be rescheduled for 1 February 2025.

7 December 2024
14:00

(1 BP) Loughborough Students	29 – 19	Macclesfield

Priory Park
Attendance: 221
Referee: Thomas Hurdley

7 December 2024
14:00

(1 BP) Old Redcliffians	19 – 21	Hinckley

Scotland Lane
Attendance: 230
Referee: Ben Simpson

7 December 2024
14:30

(1 BP) Bournville	18 – 20	Cinderford

Avery Fields
Attendance: 180
Referee: Samuel Yates

7 December 2024
14:30

Camborne	P – P	Clifton

Recreation Ground

- Game postponed due to high winds making travel unsafe. Game to be rescheduled for 1 February 2025.

7 December 2024
15:00

(1 BP) Hornets	33 – 24	Devonport Services (1 BP)

The Nest
Attendance: 409
Referee: Peter Connor

7 December 2024
15:00

Taunton Titans	10 – 10	Redruth

Veritas Park
Attendance: 700
Referee: James Walker

=== Round 13 ===
14 December 2024
14:00

(1 BP) Redruth	31 – 24	Loughborough Students (2 BP)

Recreation Ground
Attendance: 548
Referee: James Milliner-Woodcock

14 December 2024
14:15

(1 BP) Luctonians	40 – 10	Old Redcliffians

Mortimer Park
Attendance: 515
Referee: Nathan Howarth

14 December 2024
14:30

(1 BP) Clifton	54 – 14	Bournville

Station Road
Attendance: 240
Referee: Ben Simpson

14 December 2024
14:30

Devonport Services	7 – 70	Camborne (1 BP)

The Rectory Field
Attendance: 175
Referee: James West

14 December 2024
15:00

(1 BP) Cinderford	37 – 17	Exeter University

Beavis Memorial Ground
Attendance: 380
Referee: Peter Buchanan

14 December 2024
15:00

Hinckley	17 – 27	Taunton Titans (1 BP)

De Montfort Park
Attendance: 500
Referee: Daniel Parrott

14 December 2024
15:00

(1 BP) Macclesfield	28 – 24	Hornets (2 BP)

Priory Park
Attendance: 1,012
Referee: Peter Connor

=== Round 14 ===
21 December 2024
14:00

Camborne	24 – 14	Redruth

Recreation Ground
Attendance: 2,846
Referee: Callum Watson

21 December 2024
14:00

(1 BP) Exeter University	45 – 0	Devonport Services

Topsham Sports Ground
Attendance: 75
Referee: Daniel Parrott

21 December 2024
14:00

Old Redcliffians	15 – 26	Clifton (1 BP)

Scotland Lane
Attendance: 360
Referee: Haydn Davies

21 December 2024
14:15

(1 BP) Luctonians	20 – 22	Cinderford

Mortimer Park
Attendance: 736
Referee: James Walker

21 December 2024
14:30

Bournville	13 – 24	Macclesfield

Avery Fields
Attendance: 170
Referee: Nathan Howarth

21 December 2024
15:00

(1 BP) Hinckley	46 – 14	Loughborough Students

De Montfort Park
Attendance: 700
Referee: Peter Connor

21 December 2024
15:00

(1 BP) Hornets	29 – 19	Taunton Titans

The Nest
Attendance: 709
Referee: Ben Simpson

=== Round 15 ===
11 January 2025
14:00

(1 BP) Loughborough Students	55 – 14	Hornets

East Park
Attendance: 235
Referee: Callum Watson

11 January 2025
14:00

(1 BP) Redruth	33 – 10	Bournville

Recreation Ground
Attendance: 723
Referee: James Walker

11 January 2025
14:30

Clifton	16 – 12	Luctonians (1 BP)

Station Road
Attendance: 180
Referee: Peter Connor

11 January 2025
14:30

(1 BP) Devonport Services	20 – 26	Old Redcliffians (1 BP)

The Rectory Field
Attendance: 500
Referee: James Milliner-Woodcock

11 January 2025
15:00

Cinderford	P – P	Hinckley

Beavis Memorial Ground

- Postponed due to frozen pitch. Game to be rescheduled for 1 February 2025.

11 January 2025
15:00

Macclesfield	P – P	Exeter University

Priory Park

- Postponed due to frozen pitch. Game to be rescheduled for 22 February 2025.

11 January 2025
15:00

(1 BP) Taunton Titans	38 – 38	Camborne (1 BP)

Veritas Park
Attendance: 1,102
Referee: Tom Evans-Jones

=== Round 16 ===
18 January 2025
14:00

(1 BP) Camborne	59 – 28	Loughborough Students (1 BP)

Recreation Ground
Attendance: 649
Referee: Haydn Davies

18 January 2025
14:00

Exeter University	7 – 20	Redruth

Topsham Sports Ground
Attendance: 400
Referee: Nathan Howarth

18 January 2025
14:00

(1 BP) Old Redcliffians	29 – 27	Macclesfield (2 BP)

Scotland Lane
Attendance: 360
Referee: Callum Watson

18 January 2025
14:15

Luctonians	12 – 5	Devonport Services (1 BP)

Mortimer Park
Attendance: 439
Referee: Ben Simpson

18 January 2025
14:30

(1 BP) Bournville	50 – 43	Taunton Titans (2 BP)

Avery Fields
Attendance: 200
Referee: Dan Parrott

18 January 2025
15:00

Cinderford	18 – 39	Clifton (1 BP)

Beavis Memorial Ground
Attendance: 400
Referee: James Milliner-Woodcock

18 January 2025
15:00

(1 BP) Hinckley	54 – 31	Hornets (1 BP)

De Montfort Park
Attendance: 630
Referee: Harry Parsons

=== Round 17 ===
24 January 2025
19:30

(1 BP) Taunton Titans	31 – 23	Exeter University

Veritas Park
Attendance: 1,260
Referee: Haydn Davies

24 January 2025
19:45

(1 BP) Loughborough Students	49 – 7	Bournville

East Park
Attendance: 927
Referee: Peter Connor

25 January 2025
14:00

(1 BP) Redruth	31 – 29	Old Redcliffians (2 BP)

Recreation Ground
Attendance: 743
Referee: James Milliner-Woodcock

25 January 2025
14:30

(1 BP) Clifton	42 – 37	Hinckley (2 BP)

Station Road
Attendance: 180
Referee: Simon Waite

25 January 2025
14:30

Devonport Services	19 – 46	Cinderford (1 BP)

The Rectory Field
Attendance: 250
Referee: James Walker

25 January 2025
15:00

(2 BP) Hornets	31 – 34	Camborne (1 BP)

The Nest
Attendance: 425
Referee: Ben Simpson

25 January 2025
15:00

Macclesfield	17 – 36	Luctonians (1 BP)

Priory Park
Attendance: 564 (Note: The crowd figure in The Rugby Paper for Macclesfield v Luctonians was incorrectly given as 1,564. Contact with Macclesfield RUFC reveals this to be an error so 564 has been used.)
Referee: Dan Parrott

=== Rounds 12 & 15 (rescheduled games) ===
1 February 2025
14:00

Camborne	31 – 24	Clifton (2 BP)

Recreation Ground
Attendance: 748
Referee: James Milliner-Woodcock

- Game rescheduled from 7 December 2024.

1 February 2025
14:00

(1 BP) Exeter University	31 – 26	Luctonians (2 BP)

Topsham Sports Ground
Attendance: 200
Referee: Tom Evans-Jones

- Game rescheduled from 7 December 2024.

1 February 2025
15:00

(2 BP) Cinderford	29 – 31	Hinckley (1 BP)

Beavis Memorial Ground
Attendance: 250
Referee: Haydn Davies

- Game rescheduled from 11 January 2025.

=== Round 18 ===
8 February 2025
14:00

Exeter University	30 – 29	Loughborough Students (2 BP)

Topsham Sports Ground
Attendance: 250
Referee: James Milliner-Woodcock

8 February 2025
14:00

(1 BP) Old Redcliffians	12 – 19	Taunton Titans

Scotland Lane
Attendance: 386
Referee: Dan Parrott

8 February 2025
14:15

Luctonians	14 – 23	Redruth

Mortimer Park
Attendance: 301
Referee: James Walker

8 February 2025
14:30

(1 BP) Bournville	30 – 41	Hornets (1 BP)

Avery Fields
Attendance: 140
Referee: Ben Simpson

8 February 2025
14:30

(1 BP) Clifton	42 – 26	Devonport Services (1 BP)

Station Road
Attendance: 105
Referee: Haydn Davies

8 February 2025
15:00

(1 BP) Cinderford	48 – 28	Macclesfield (1 BP)

Beavis Memorial Ground
Attendance: 205
Referee: Peter Connor

8 February 2025
15:00

(2 BP) Hinckley	39 – 44	Camborne (1 BP)

De Montfort Park
Attendance: 790
Referee: Samuel Yates

=== Round 19 ===
15 February 2025
14:00

(1 BP) Loughborough Students	34 – 7	Old Redcliffians

East Park
Attendance: 507
Referee: Ben Simpson

15 February 2025
14:00

Redruth	17 – 10	Cinderford (1 BP)

Recreation Ground
Attendance: 748
Referee: Haydn Davies

15 February 2025
14:30

(1 BP) Camborne	52 – 5	Bournville

Recreation Ground
Attendance: 400
Referee: Nathan Howarth

15 February 2025
14:30

(1 BP) Devonport Services	28 – 22	Hinckley (1 BP)

The Rectory Field
Attendance: 140
Referee: Callum Watson

15 February 2025
15:00

(1 BP) Hornets	45 – 22	Exeter University

The Nest
Attendance: 589
Referee: Dan Parrott

15 February 2025
15:00

(1 BP) Macclesfield	19 – 25	Clifton (1 BP)

Priory Park
Attendance: 610
Referee: Daniel Woods

15 February 2025
15:00

(1 BP) Taunton Titans	36 – 25	Luctonians (1 BP)

Veritas Park
Attendance: 1,010
Referee: James Milliner-Woodcock

=== Round 15 (rescheduled game) ===
22 February 2025
15:00

(1 BP) Macclesfield	27 – 22	Exeter University (1 BP)

Priory Park
Attendance: 493
Referee: Andy Shaw

- Game rescheduled from 11 January 2025.

=== Round 20 ===
1 March 2025
14:00

(1 BP) Exeter University	28 – 44	Camborne (1 BP)

Topsham Sports Ground
Attendance: 250
Referee: Ben Simpson

1 March 2025
14:00

(2 BP) Old Redcliffians	29 – 31	Hornets (1 BP)

Scotland Lane
Attendance: 450
Referee: James Milliner-Woodcock

1 March 2025
14:30

(1 BP) Clifton	39 – 28	Redruth (1 BP)

Station Road
Attendance: 230
Referee: George Ounsley

1 March 2025
14:30

(1 BP) Devonport Services	38 – 34	Macclesfield (2 BP)

The Rectory Field
Attendance: 150
Referee: Tom Evans-Jones

1 March 2025
15:00

(1 BP) Cinderford	34 – 21	Taunton Titans

Beavis Memorial Ground
Attendance: 325
Referee: Callum Watson

1 March 2025
15:00

(1 BP) Hinckley	64 – 19	Bournville

De Montfort Park
Attendance: 400
Referee: Dan Parrott

1 March 2025
15:00

(1 BP) Luctonians	38 – 49	Loughborough Students (1 BP)

Mortimer Park
Attendance: 545
Referee: Haydn Davies

=== Round 21 ===
8 March 2025
14:00

(1 BP) Loughborough Students	60 – 24	Cinderford (1 BP)

East Park
Attendance: 476
Referee: Daniel Rowlands

8 March 2025
14:30

(1 BP) Bournville	27 – 58	Exeter University (1 BP)

Avery Fields
Attendance: 200
Referee: Peter Connor

8 March 2025
14:30

(1 BP) Camborne	40 – 12	Old Redcliffians

Recreation Ground
Attendance: 758
Referee: James Walker

8 March 2025
14:30

(1 BP) Redruth	34 – 13	Devonport Services

Recreation Ground
Attendance: 689 (Note: The Rugby Paper gave Redruth's home game versus Devonport Services on 8 March 2025 an attendance figure of 285. Contact from the Redruth president reveals this to be a grave underestimate and the actual attendance was 689.)
Referee: Dan Parrott

8 March 2025
15:00

(1 BP) Hornets	36 – 28	Luctonians (1 BP)

The Nest
Attendance: 499
Referee: Tom Evans-Jones

8 March 2025
15:00

Taunton Titans	7 – 26	Clifton (1 BP)

Veritas Park
Attendance: 620
Referee: Alex Powdrell

8 March 2025
18:00

(1 BP) Macclesfield	29 – 54	Hinckley (1 BP)

Priory Park
Attendance: 632
Referee: Gavin Jones

=== Round 22 ===
15 March 2025
14:00

(1 BP) Old Redcliffians	45 – 20	Bournville

Scotland Lane
Attendance: 600
Referee: Tom Evans-Jones

15 March 2025
14:30

(1 BP) Clifton	60 – 36	Loughborough Students (1 BP)

Station Road
Attendance: 190
Referee: James Milliner-Woodcock

15 March 2025
14:30

(1 BP) Devonport Services	24 – 43	Taunton Titans (1 BP)

The Rectory Field
Attendance: 350
Referee: Ben Simpson

15 March 2025
15:00

(1 BP) Cinderford	20 – 26	Hornets (1 BP)

Beavis Memorial Ground
Attendance: 325
Referee: James Walker

15 March 2025
15:00

(1 BP) Hinckley	48 – 38	Exeter University (1 BP)

De Montfort Park
Attendance: 389
Referee: Haydn Davies

15 March 2025
15:00

(1 BP) Luctonians	25 – 17	Camborne

Mortimer Park
Attendance: 480
Referee: Callum Watson

15 March 2025
15:00

(1 BP) Macclesfield	31 – 14	Redruth

Priory Park
Attendance: 543
Referee: Samuel Yates

=== Round 23 ===
22 March 2025
14:00

Exeter University	24 – 32	Old Redcliffians (1 BP)

Topsham Sports Ground
Attendance: 400
Referee: James Walker

22 March 2025
14:00

(1 BP) Loughborough Students	49 – 45	Devonport Services (2 BP)

East Park
Attendance: 583
Referee: Nathan Howarth

22 March 2025
14:30

Bournville	27 – 38	Luctonians (1 BP)

Avery Fields
Attendance: 320
Referee: Dan Parrott

22 March 2025
14:30

(1 BP) Camborne	26 – 14	Cinderford

Recreation Ground
Attendance: 849
Referee: James Milliner-Woodcock

22 March 2025
14:30

Redruth	8 – 17	Hinckley

Recreation Ground
Attendance: 869 (Note: The Rugby Paper gave Redruth's home game versus Hinckley on 22 March 2025 an attendance figure of just 240. Contact from the Redruth president reveals this was the second time in a month that the attendance figure was incorrect and the actual attendance was much higher at 869.)
Referee: Ben Simpson

22 March 2025
15:00

(1 BP) Hornets	24 – 36	Clifton (1 BP)

The Nest
Attendance: 600
Referee: Haydn Davies

22 March 2025
15:00

(1 BP) Taunton Titans	38 – 33	Macclesfield (2 BP)

Veritas Park
Attendance: 718
Referee: Peter Connor

=== Round 24 ===
5 April 2025
14:30

(1 BP) Clifton	41 – 26	Camborne (1 BP)

Station Road
Attendance: 750
Referee: Ben Rayner

5 April 2025
14:30

(1 BP) Devonport Services	34 – 41	Hornets (1 BP)

The Rectory Field
Attendance: 205
Referee: Dan Parrott

- Devonport Services are relegated due to results in other tier 4 leagues meaning they could not finish as the best ranked 13th placed side.

5 April 2025
15:00

(1 BP) Cinderford	61 – 24	Bournville (1 BP)

Beavis Memorial Ground
Attendance: 354
Referee: Daniel Woods

- Bournville are relegated due to results in other tier 4 leagues meaning they could not finish as the best ranked 13th placed side.

5 April 2025
15:00

(1 BP) Luctonians	61 – 24	Exeter University (1 BP)

Mortimer Park
Attendance: 611
Referee: Andrew Shaw

5 April 2025
15:00

(1 BP) Redruth	29 – 27	Taunton Titans (2 BP)

Recreation Ground
Attendance: 735
Referee: James Milliner-Woodcock

5 April 2025
15:15

(1 BP) Hinckley	57 – 26	Old Redcliffians (1 BP)

De Montfort Park
Attendance: 820
Referee: Rebecca Piddlestone

5 April 2025
15:30

(2 BP) Macclesfield	42 – 47	Loughborough Students (1 BP)

Priory Park
Attendance: 401 (Note: The Rugby Paper gave two attendances for Macclesfield's game against Loughborough on 5 April 2025 - 339 in the match report and then 401 in the results page. The higher figure has been given as it is more in alignment with Macclesfield's attendances towards the end of the season.)
Referee: Lloyd Davies

=== Round 25 ===
12 April 2025
14:00

(1 BP) Exeter University	53 – 38	Cinderford (1 BP)

Topsham Sports Ground
Attendance: 350
Referee: Rebecca Piddlesden

12 April 2025
14:00

(1 BP) Loughborough Students	52 – 26	Redruth (1 BP)

East Park
Attendance: 715
Referee: Peter Connor

12 April 2025
14:30

(1 BP) Bournville	30 – 50	Clifton (1 BP)

Avery Fields
Attendance: 200
Referee: James Walker

12 April 2025
14:30

(1 BP) Camborne	43 – 26	Devonport Services (1 BP)

Recreation Ground
Attendance: 1,054
Referee: Nathan Howarth

12 April 2025
15:00

(1 BP) Hornets	36 – 35	Macclesfield (2 BP)

The Nest
Attendance: 511
Referee: James Milliner-Woodcock

12 April 2025
15:00

(1 BP) Old Redcliffians	15 – 17	Luctonians

Scotland Lane
Attendance: 210
Referee: Dan Parrott

12 April 2025
15:00

(1 BP) Taunton Titans	49 – 47	Hinckley (2 BP)

Veritas Park
Attendance: 807
Referee: Tom Bird

=== Round 26 ===
26 April 2025
15:00

(1 BP) Cinderford	25 – 34	Old Redcliffians (1 BP)

Beavis Memorial Ground
Attendance: 425
Referee: Nathan Howarth

26 April 2025
15:00

(1 BP) Clifton	48 – 22	Exeter University

Station Road
Attendance: 1,000
Referee: Tom Evans-Jones

- Clifton are champions.

26 April 2025
15:00

(1 BP) Devonport Services	29 – 47	Bournville (1 BP)

The Rectory Field
Attendance: 300
Referee: James Milliner-Woodcock

26 April 2025
15:00

Luctonians	24 – 12	Hinckley

Mortimer Park
Attendance: 678
Referee: Thomas Hurdley

26 April 2025
15:00

(1 BP) Macclesfield	40 – 27	Camborne (1 BP)

Priory Park
Attendance: 350
Referee: Daniel Woods

26 April 2025
15:00

(1 BP) Redruth	36 – 26	Hornets (1 BP)

Recreation Ground
Attendance: 700
Referee: Haydn Davies

26 April 2025
15:00

(1 BP) Taunton Titans	38 – 35	Loughborough Students (2 BP)

Veritas Park
Attendance: 1,014
Referee: Ben Simpson

== Attendances ==
Club	Home Games	Total	Average	Highest	Lowest	% Capacity
Bournville	13	2,540	195	320	140	N/A
Camborne	13	11,848	911	2,846	400	13%
Cinderford	13	3,993	307	425	154	12%
Clifton	13	3,972	306	1,000	105	14%
Devonport Services	13	3,359	258	500	140	13%
Exeter University	13	3,138	241	400	75	N/A
Hinckley	13	7,079	545	820	389	27%
Hornets	13	5,903	454	709	200	41%
Loughborough Students	13	6,663	513	927	221	51%
Luctonians	13	6,572	506	736	301	20%
Macclesfield	13	5,855	450	1,012	212	36%
Old Redcliffians	13	4,111	316	600	195	32%
Redruth	13	11,038	849	2,478	548	24%
Taunton Titans	13	11,105	854	1,260	620	43%

== Individual statistics ==
=== Top points scorers ===
Rank	Player	Team	Points
1	Kyle Moyle	Camborne	247
2	Louie Sinclair	Taunton Titans	235
3	Ben Priddey	Camborne	220
4	Ben Taylor	Loughborough Students	216
5	Charlie Carter	Hornets	192
5	Harry Oliver	Macclesfield	192
6	Freddie Morgan	Bournville	188
7	Rory Volwes	Hinckley	163
8	Alex Ducker	Camborne	157
9	Dean Wills	Redruth	156

=== Top try scorers ===
Rank	Player	Team	Tries
1	Ben Priddey	Camborne	44
2	Alex Ducker	Camborne	31
3	Thomas Rowe	Loughborough Students	23
4	Samuel Smith	Cinderford	20
5	Joshua Sheppard	Hornets	18
6	Nathan Taylor	Cinderford	17
7	Alexander Kilbane	Clifton	16
7	Ben Link	Luctonians	16
7	Rocky Prowse	Taunton Titans	16
8	Zakaria Hamid	Clifton	15
8	Harry Oliver	Macclesfield	15

== See also ==
- 2024–25 National League 1
- 2024–25 National League 2 East
- 2024–25 National League 2 North
