= 2024–25 National League 2 East =

Rugby union competition in England

- Countries: England, Guernsey
- Date: 7 September 2024 – 26 April 2025
- Champions: Tonbridge (1st title)
- Runners-up: Dorking
- Relegated: Worthing, Colchester
- Matches played: 182
- Attendance: 72,633 (average 399 per match)
- Highest attendance: 1,204 – Havant v Oxford Harlequins, 22 March 2025
- Lowest attendance: 110 (3) – Oxford Harlequins v Worthing, 9 November 2024, Tonbridge v Henley, 7 December 2024, Westcombe Park v Worthing, 14 December 2024
- Tries scored: 1604 (average 8.8 per match)
- Top point scorer: 304 – Frank Reynolds (Canterbury)
- Top try scorer: 26 – Anthony Armstrong (Guernsey)

The 2024–25 National League 2 East was the third season of the fourth-tier (east) of the English domestic rugby union competitions; one of three at this level. The others are National League 2 North and National League 2 West.

Tonbridge Juddians finished as league champions on 12 April with one game still to play following a dominant victory at home against Oxford Harlequins. The title battle had been a three way battle for most of the season, but in the end Juddians were fairly comfortable, finishing 6 points clear of runners up Dorking and 9 points clear of 3rd placed Barnes, to earn promotion to the 2025–26 National League 1 after an absence of three seasons.

The reformation of the RFU Championship from 12 to 14 teams meant that one team per level would be safe from relegation. This meant that the battle to avoid the drop went on longer than anticipated but in the end both Colchester and Worthing Raiders would go down on 5 April with two games still to play due to the results of National League 2 North sides making it impossible for either side to avoid the drop - with Billingham from the 2024–25 National League 2 North ultimately staying up as the best ranked 13th placed side in National 2.

== Structure ==
The league consists of fourteen teams who play the others on a home and away basis, to make a total of 26 matches each. The champions are promoted to National League 1 and the bottom two teams are relegated to Regional 1 South Central or Regional 1 South East.

The results of the matches contribute points to the league as follows:

- 4 points are awarded for a win
- 2 points are awarded for a draw
- 0 points are awarded for a loss, however
- 1 losing (bonus) point is awarded to a team that loses a match by 7 points or fewer
- 1 additional (bonus) point is awarded to a team scoring 4 tries or more in a match.

Earlier in the season it had been indicated that the RFU Championship was due to increase from 12 to 14 teams for 2025–26. This was finally confirmed by the RFU with most of the season completed, and the subsequent league restructuring meant that one team per league level would have a reprieve from relegation, meaning that the best ranked 13th place team in National League 2 East, National League 2 North or National League 2 West would stay up at the end of 2024–25.

=== Participating teams and locations ===
Locations of the 2024–25 National League 2 East teams

Team	Ground	Capacity	City/Area	Previous season
Barnes	Barn Elms	1,000	Barnes, London	Runners up
Bury St Edmunds	The Haberden	3,000 (135 seats)	Bury St Edmunds, Suffolk	6th
Canterbury	Marine Travel Ground	1,500 (75 seats)	Canterbury, Kent	7th
Colchester	Raven Park	1,200	Colchester, Essex	Promoted from Regional 1SE (champions)
Dorking	The Big Field	1,500	Dorking, Surrey	3rd
Guernsey Raiders	Footes Lane	5,000 (720 seats)	Saint Peter Port, Guernsey	10th
Havant	Hook's Lane	1,500 (500 seats)	Havant, Hampshire	Promoted from Regional 1SC (champions)
Henley Hawks	Dry Leas	4,000	Henley-on-Thames, Oxfordshire	4th
Old Albanian	Woollam's Playing Fields	1,000	St Albans, Hertfordshire	8th
Oxford Harlequins	Horspath Sports Ground	1,000	Horspath, Oxfordshire	Promoted from Regional 1 Midlands (champions)
Sevenoaks	Knole Paddock	1,000	Sevenoaks, Kent	11th
Tonbridge Juddians	The Slade	1,500	Tonbridge, Kent	5th
Westcombe Park	Goddington Dene	3,200 (200 seats)	Orpington, London	9th
Worthing Raiders	Roundstone Lane	1,500 (100 seats)	Angmering, West Sussex	12th

== League table ==
2024–25 National League 2 East table
Pos	Team	Pld	W	D	L	PF	PA	PD	TB	LB	Pts	Qualification
1	Tonbridge Juddians (C)	26	22	0	4	977	593	+384	22	1	111	Promotion place
2	Dorking	26	20	0	6	960	654	+306	22	3	105	
3	Barnes	26	19	0	7	821	556	+265	19	7	102	
4	Canterbury	26	18	0	8	931	681	+250	18	3	93	
5	Westcombe Park	26	16	0	10	803	748	+55	16	4	84	
6	Old Albanian	26	14	0	12	787	771	+16	19	6	81	
7	Guernsey Raiders	26	14	0	12	823	722	+101	18	6	80	
8	Henley Hawks	26	15	1	10	630	625	+5	10	5	77	
9	Bury St Edmunds	26	11	0	15	891	892	−1	22	10	71 (Note: 5 points deducted)	
10	Sevenoaks	26	10	0	16	640	765	−125	12	6	58	
11	Havant	26	8	1	17	674	847	−173	11	7	52	
12	Oxford Harlequins	26	7	1	18	721	1025	−304	16	4	50	
13	Colchester (R)	26	3	1	22	612	961	−349	15	5	34	Relegation place
14	Worthing Raiders (R)	26	3	0	23	637	1067	−430	15	7	34	Relegation place

Updated to match(es) played on 12 April 2025. Source: National League Rugby
Rules for classification: If teams are level at any stage, tiebreakers are applied in the following order:
1. Number of matches won
2. Number of matches drawn
3. Difference between points for and against
4. Total number of points for
5. Aggregate number of points scored in matches between tied teams
6. Number of matches won excluding the first match, then the second and so on until the tie is settled
  Notes:

== Fixtures & results ==
Fixtures for the season were published by the RFU on 31 May 2025.

=== Round 1 ===
7 September 2024
14:00

(1 BP) Guernsey Raiders	24 – 16	Worthing Raiders

Footes Lane
Attendance: 458
Referee: Alex Powdrell

7 September 2024
15:00

(1 BP) Barnes	47 – 22	Oxford Harlequins

Barn Elms
Attendance: 280
Referee: Philip Russell

7 September 2024
15:00

(1 BP) Canterbury	53 – 13	Colchester

Marine Travel Ground
Attendance: 320
Referee: Peter Buchanan

7 September 2024
15:00

Havant	25 – 15	Sevenoaks

Hook's Lane
Attendance: 803
Referee: Tom Bird

7 September 2024
15:00

(1 BP) Old Albanian	21 – 22	Henley Hawks

Woollam's Playing Fields
Attendance: 393
Referee: Alex Noot

7 September 2024
15:00

(1 BP) Tonbridge Juddians	45 – 31	Dorking (1 BP)

The Slade
Attendance: 287
Referee: Rebecca Piddlesden

7 September 2024
15:00

(1 BP) Westcombe Park	29 – 24	Bury St Edmunds (2 BP)

Goddington Dene
Attendance: 250
Referee: Conor Boyle

=== Round 2 ===
14 September 2024
14:00

(1 BP) Guernsey Raiders	37 – 26	Westcombe Park (1 BP)

Footes Lane
Attendance: 421
Referee: Peter Buchanan

14 September 2024
15:00

(1 BP) Dorking	29 – 24	Barnes (1 BP)

The Big Field
Attendance: 420
Referee: Alex Powdrell

14 September 2024
15:00

(1 BP) Colchester	26 – 48	Tonbridge Juddians (1 BP)

Raven Park
Attendance: 375
Referee: Tom Bird

14 September 2024
15:00

Henley Hawks	20 – 17	Bury St Edmunds (1 BP)

Dry Leas
Attendance: 377
Referee: Jack Sutton

14 September 2024
15:00

(2 BP) Oxford Harlequins	32 – 38	Old Albanian (1 BP)

Horspath Sports Ground
Attendance: 223
Referee: Alex Rose

14 September 2024
15:00

Sevenoaks	14 – 27	Canterbury (1 BP)

Knole Paddock
Attendance: 410
Referee: Simon Waite

14 September 2024
15:00

(2 BP) Worthing Raiders	34 – 40	Havant (1 BP)

Roundstone Lane
Attendance: 300
Referee: Phillip Russell

=== Round 3 ===
21 September 2024
14:00

Havant	20 – 39	Guernsey Raiders (1 BP)

Hook's Lane
Attendance: 630
Referee: Lloyd Davies

21 September 2024
15:00

(1 BP) Barnes	36 – 20	Colchester

Barn Elms
Attendance: 157
Referee: Alex Rose

21 September 2024
15:00

(1 BP) Bury St Edmunds	61 – 33	Oxford Harlequins (1 BP)

The Haberden
Attendance: 511
Referee: George Jones

21 September 2024
15:00

(1 BP) Canterbury	49 – 21	Worthing Raiders

Marine Travel Ground
Attendance: 417
Referee: Jack Sutton

21 September 2024
15:00

(1 BP) Old Albanian	28 – 43	Dorking (1 BP)

Woollam's Playing Fields
Attendance: 393
Referee: Simon Waite

21 September 2024
15:00

(1 BP) Tonbridge Juddians	50 – 10	Sevenoaks

The Slade
Attendance: 753
Referee: Phillip Russell

21 September 2024
15:00

(1 BP) Westcombe Park	32 – 29	Henley Hawks (2 BP)

Goddington Dene
Attendance: 339
Referee: Alex Powdrell

=== Round 4 ===
28 September 2024
15:00

Colchester	19 – 38	Old Albanian (1 BP)

Raven Park
Attendance: 340
Referee: Phil Russell

28 September 2024
15:00

(1 BP) Dorking	47 – 27	Bury St Edmunds

The Big Field
Attendance: 415
Referee: Connor Boyle

28 September 2024
15:00

(1 BP) Havant	23 – 26	Westcombe Park (1 BP)

Hook's Lane
Attendance: 638
Referee: George Jones

28 September 2024
15:00

Oxford Harlequins	19 – 19	Henley Hawks

Horspath Sports Ground
Attendance: 287
Referee: Alex Rose

28 September 2024
15:00

Sevenoaks	5 – 26	Barnes (1 BP)

Knole Paddock
Attendance: 475
Referee: Jack Sutton

28 September 2024
15:00

Worthing Raiders	5 – 38	Tonbridge Juddians (1 BP)

Roundstone Lane
Attendance: 173
Referee: Peter Buchanan

28 September 2024
16:00

(1 BP) Guernsey Raiders	41 – 23	Canterbury

Footes Lane
Attendance: 638
Referee: Alex Powdrell

=== Round 5 ===
5 October 2024
14:30

(1 BP) Tonbridge Juddians	38 – 37	Guernsey Raiders (2 BP)

The Slade
Attendance: 831
Referee: Conor Boyle

5 October 2024
15:00

(1 BP) Barnes	55 – 26	Worthing Raiders (1 BP)

Barn Elms
Attendance: 143
Referee: George Jones

5 October 2024
15:00

(1 BP) Bury St Edmunds	36 – 22	Colchester

The Haberden
Attendance: 875
Referee: Simon Waite

5 October 2024
15:00

(1 BP) Canterbury	36 – 31	Havant (2 BP)

Marine Travel Ground
Attendance: 443
Referee: Tom Bird

5 October 2024
15:00

Henley Hawks	5 – 34	Dorking (1 BP)

Dry Leas
Attendance: 427
Referee: Phillip Russell

5 October 2024
15:00

(1 BP) Old Albanian	52 – 49	Sevenoaks (2 BP)

Woollam's Playing Fields
Attendance: 229
Referee: Alex Powdrell

5 October 2024
15:00

(1 BP) Westcombe Park	46 – 24	Oxford Harlequins

Goddington Dene
Attendance: 311
Referee: Jack Sutton

=== Round 6 ===
12 October 2024
15:00

Canterbury	39 – 22	Westcombe Park

Marine Travel Ground
Attendance: 617
Referee: Phil Russell

12 October 2024
15:00

(1 BP) Colchester	7 – 10	Henley Hawks

Raven Park
Attendance: 361
Referee: Alex Powdrell

12 October 2024
15:00

(1 BP) Dorking	36 – 7	Oxford Harlequins

The Big Field
Attendance: 510
Referee: Tom Bird

12 October 2024
15:00

(1 BP) Guernsey Raiders	35 – 31	Barnes (2 BP)

Footes Lane
Attendance: 658
Referee: Simon Waite

12 October 2024
15:00

(1 BP) Havant	31 – 39	Tonbridge Juddians (1 BP)

Hook's Lane
Attendance: 828
Referee: Jack Sutton

12 October 2024
15:00

Sevenoaks	19 – 28	Bury St Edmunds (1 BP)

Knole Paddock
Attendance: 390
Referee: George Jones

12 October 2024
15:00

(2 BP) Worthing Raiders	29 – 31	Old Albanian (1 BP)

Roundstone Lane
Attendance: 402
Referee: Connor Boyle

=== Round 7 ===
19 October 2024
14:00

Old Albanian	14 – 37	Guernsey Raiders (1 BP)

Woollam's Playing Fields
Attendance: 229
Referee: Harry Parsons

19 October 2024
15:00

(1 BP) Barnes	33 – 21	Havant

Barn Elms
Attendance: 186
Referee: Connor Boyle

19 October 2024
15:00

(1 BP) Bury St Edmunds	32 – 29	Worthing Raiders (2 BP)

The Haberden
Attendance: 413
Referee: Simon Waite

19 October 2024
15:00

Henley Hawks	26 – 20	Sevenoaks (2 BP)

Dry Leas
Attendance: 275
Referee: Alex Rose

19 October 2024
15:00

(1 BP) Oxford Harlequins	48 – 22	Colchester (1 BP)

Horspath Sports Ground
Attendance: 376
Referee: Peter Buchanan

19 October 2024
15:00

(1 BP) Tonbridge Juddians	40 – 24	Canterbury (1 BP)

The Slade
Attendance: 412
Referee: Alex Powdrell

19 October 2024
15:00

(1 BP) Westcombe Park	31 – 40	Dorking (1 BP)

Goddington Dene
Attendance: 180
Referee: Tom Bird

=== Round 8 ===
26 October 2024
15:00

Canterbury	13 – 22	Barnes

Marine Travel Ground
Attendance: 325
Referee: Jack Sutton

26 October 2024
15:00

(1 BP) Colchester	25 – 38	Dorking (1 BP)

Raven Park
Attendance: 438
Referee: Holly Wood

26 October 2024
15:00

(1 BP) Havant	37 – 29	Old Albanian (1 BP)

Hook's Lane
Attendance: 756
Referee: Alex Rose

26 October 2024
15:00

(1 BP) Sevenoaks	43 – 29	Oxford Harlequins (1 BP)

Knole Paddock
Attendance: 450
Referee: Simon Waite

26 October 2024
15:00

(1 BP) Tonbridge Juddians	40 – 5	Westcombe Park

The Slade
Attendance: 412
Referee: Peter Buchanan

26 October 2024
15:00

(1 BP) Worthing Raiders	34 – 55	Henley Hawks (1 BP)

Roundstone Lane
Attendance: 240
Referee: Tom Bird

26 October 2024
16:00

(1 BP) Guernsey Raiders	36 – 35	Bury St Edmunds (2 BP)

Footes Lane
Attendance: 887
Referee: Phil Russell

=== Round 9 ===
9 November 2024
14:00

(1 BP) Barnes	25 – 26	Tonbridge Juddians (1 BP)

Barn Elms
Attendance: 212
Referee: Alex Rose

9 November 2024
14:00

(1 BP) Henley Hawks	26 – 15	Guernsey Raiders

Dry Leas
Attendance: 277
Referee: Sam Yates

9 November 2024
14:00

(1 BP) Westcombe Park	39 – 36	Colchester (2 BP)

Goddington Dene
Attendance: 150
Referee: Harry Parsons

9 November 2024
14:30

(1 BP) Dorking	50 – 26	Sevenoaks (1 BP)

The Big Field
Attendance: 400
Referee: Conor Boyle

9 November 2024
15:00

(2 BP) Bury St Edmunds	49 – 53	Havant (1 BP)

The Haberden
Attendance: 295
Referee: Tom Bird

9 November 2024
15:00

Old Albanian	17 – 54	Canterbury (1 BP)

Woollam's Playing Fields
Attendance: 202
Referee: George Jones

9 November 2024
15:00

(1 BP) Oxford Harlequins	34 – 20	Worthing Raiders

Horspath Sports Ground
Attendance: 110
Referee: Simon Waite

=== Round 10 ===
16 November 2024
14:00

(1 BP) Barnes	34 – 12	Westcombe Park

Barn Elms
Attendance: 152
Referee: George Jones

16 November 2024
14:00

(1 BP) Guernsey Raiders	49 – 27	Oxford Harlequins (1 BP)

Footes Lane
Attendance: 587
Referee: Alex Rowe

16 November 2024
14:00

(1 BP) Tonbridge Juddians	41 – 28	Old Albanian (1 BP)

The Slade
Attendance: 322
Referee: Alex Powdrell

16 November 2024
14:00

(1 BP) Worthing Raiders	34 – 61	Dorking (1 BP)

Roundstone Lane
Attendance: 512
Referee: James Walker

16 November 2024
14:30

(1 BP) Sevenoaks	23 – 28	Colchester (1 BP)

Knole Paddock
Attendance: 380
Referee: Phil Russell

16 November 2024
15:00

(1 BP) Canterbury	59 – 35	Bury St Edmunds (1 BP)

Marine Travel Ground
Attendance: 450
Referee: Holly Wood

16 November 2024
15:00

Havant	28 – 36	Henley Hawks (1 BP)

Hook's Lane
Attendance: 776
Referee: Peter Buchanan

=== Round 11 ===
23 November 2024
14:00

Dorking	P – P	Guernsey Raiders

The Big Field

- Postponed as strong winds caused unsafe travel conditions for visiting side. Game to be rescheduled for 1 February 2025.

23 November 2024
14:00

(1 BP) Westcombe Park	12 – 14	Sevenoaks

Goddington Dene
Attendance: 250
Referee: Holly Wood

23 November 2024
14:30

(1 BP) Old Albanian	10 – 13	Barnes

Woollam's Playing Fields
Attendance: 282
Referee: Simon Waite

23 November 2024
15:00

(1 BP) Bury St Edmunds	32 – 21	Tonbridge Juddians

The Haberden
Attendance: 235
Referee: George Jones

23 November 2024
15:00

(1 BP) Colchester	14 – 20	Worthing Raiders (1 BP)

Raven Park
Attendance: 342
Referee: Peter Buchanan

23 November 2024
15:00

Henley Hawks	17 – 16	Canterbury (1 BP)

Dry Leas
Attendance: 187
Referee: Tom Bird

23 November 2024
15:00

(1 BP) Oxford Harlequins	17 – 22	Havant

Horspath Sports Ground
Attendance: 117
Referee: Phillip Russell

=== Round 12 ===
7 December 2024
14:00

(1 BP) Barnes	31 – 5	Bury St Edmunds

Barn Elms
Attendance: 189
Referee: Alex Powdrell

7 December 2024
14:00

Guernsey Raiders	P – P	Colchester

Footes Lane

- Postponed due to high winds. Game to be rescheduled for 22 February 2025.

7 December 2024
14:00

Tonbridge Juddians	17 – 0	Henley Hawks

The Slade
Attendance: 110
Referee: Simon Waite

7 December 2024
14:00

Worthing Raiders	7 – 36	Sevenoaks (1 BP)

Roundstone Lane
Attendance: 303
Referee: Peter Buchanan

7 December 2024
15:00

(1 BP) Canterbury	31 – 10	Oxford Harlequins

Marine Travel Ground
Attendance: 250
Referee: Conor Boyle

7 December 2024
15:00

(1 BP) Havant	25 – 28	Dorking

Hook's Lane
Attendance: 339
Referee: Tom Bird

7 December 2024
15:00

(1 BP) Old Albanian	17 – 19	Westcombe Park

Woollam's Playing Fields
Attendance: 182
Referee: Philip Russell

=== Round 13 ===
14 December 2024
14:00

(2 BP) Dorking	34 – 35	Canterbury (1 BP)

The Big Field
Attendance: 453
Referee: Philip Russell

14 December 2024
14:00

Sevenoaks	24 – 16	Guernsey Raiders

Knole Paddock
Attendance: 411
Referee: George Jones

14 December 2024
14:00

(1 BP) Westcombe Park	68 – 19	Worthing Raiders

Goddington Dene
Attendance: 110
Referee: Tom Bird

14 December 2024
15:00

Bury St Edmunds	24 – 20	Old Albanian (1 BP)

The Haberden
Attendance: 397
Referee: Jack Sutton

14 December 2024
15:00

(1 BP) Colchester	31 – 31	Havant (1 BP)

Raven Park
Attendance: 386
Referee: Alex Powdrell

14 December 2024
15:00

(1 BP) Henley Hawks	22 – 32	Barnes (1 BP)

Dry Leas
Attendance: 350
Referee: Conor Boyd

14 December 2024
15:00

(1 BP) Oxford Harlequins	36 – 54	Tonbridge Juddians (1 BP)

Horspath Sports Ground
Attendance: 148
Referee: Alex Rose

=== Round 14 ===
21 December 2024
14:00

(1 BP) Barnes	7 – 14	Dorking

Barn Elms
Attendance: 287
Referee: Tom Bird

21 December 2024
14:00

(1 BP) Tonbridge Juddians	22 – 0	Colchester

The Slade
Attendance: 273
Referee: Rebecca Piddlesden

21 December 2024
14:00

Westcombe Park	14 – 8	Guernsey Raiders (1 BP)

Goddington Dene
Attendance: 165
Referee: Alex Rose

21 December 2024
15:00

(1 BP) Bury St Edmunds	41 – 17	Henley Hawks

The Haberden
Attendance: 435
Referee: Philip Russell

21 December 2024
15:00

(1 BP) Canterbury	35 – 22	Sevenoaks

Marine Travel Ground
Attendance: 380
Referee: Simon Waite

21 December 2024
15:00

Havant	22 – 19	Worthing Raiders (1 BP)

Hook's Lane
Attendance: 1,176
Referee: Jack Sutton

21 December 2024
15:00

(1 BP) Old Albanian	52 – 8	Oxford Harlequins

Woollam's Playing Fields
Attendance: 291
Referee: Peter Buchanan

=== Round 15 ===
11 January 2025
15:00

Dorking	P – P	Old Albanian

The Big Field

- Postponed due to frozen pitch. Game to be rescheduled for 22 February 2025.

11 January 2025
15:00

(1 BP) Colchester	28 – 57	Barnes (1 BP)

Raven Park
Attendance: 362
Referee: Philip Russell

11 January 2025
15:00

(1 BP) Guernsey Raiders	40 – 14	Havant

Footes Lane
Attendance: 600
Referee: Peter Buchanan

11 January 2025
15:00

Henley Hawks	P – P	Westcombe Park

Dry Leas

- Postponed due to frozen pitch. Game to be rescheduled for 1 February 2025.

11 January 2025
15:00

(1 BP) Oxford Harlequins	38 – 31	Bury St Edmunds (2 BP)

Horspath Sports Ground
Attendance: 133
Referee: George Jones

11 January 2025
15:00

Sevenoaks	P – P	Tonbridge Juddians

Knole Paddock

- Postponed due to frozen pitch. Game to be rescheduled for 1 February 2025.

11 January 2025
15:00

Worthing Raiders	P – P	Canterbury

Roundstone Lane

- Postponed due to frozen pitch. Game to be rescheduled for 1 February 2025.

=== Round 16 ===
18 January 2025
14:00

(1 BP) Barnes	20 – 17	Sevenoaks (1 BP)

Barn Elms
Attendance: 259
Referee: Conor Boyle

18 January 2025
14:00

Canterbury	24 – 15	Guernsey Raiders

Marine Travel Ground
Attendance: 500
Referee: Jack Sutton

18 January 2025
14:00

(1 BP) Tonbridge Juddians	45 – 17	Worthing Raiders

The Slade
Attendance: 226
Referee: Peter Buchanan

18 January 2025
14:00

(1 BP) Westcombe Park	34 – 20	Havant

Goddington Dene
Attendance: 225
Referee: George Jones

18 January 2025
15:00

(2 BP) Bury St Edmunds	42 – 43	Dorking (1 BP)

The Haberden
Attendance: 483
Referee: Alex Powdrell

18 January 2025
15:00

Henley Hawks	19 – 12	Oxford Harlequins (1 BP)

Dry Leas
Attendance: 354
Referee: Tom Bird

18 January 2025
15:00

(1 BP) Old Albanian	38 – 12	Colchester

Woollam's Playing Fields
Attendance: 219
Referee: George Ounsley

=== Round 17 ===
25 January 2025
14:00

(1 BP) Dorking	22 – 23	Henley Hawks

The Big Field
Attendance: 525
Referee: Jack Sutton

25 January 2025
14:00

Worthing Raiders	19 – 41	Barnes (1 BP)

Roundstone Lane
Attendance: 246
Referee: Alex Rose

25 January 2025
14:00

Sevenoaks	31 – 29	Old Albanian (2 BP)

Knole Paddock
Attendance: 296
Referee: Tom Bird

25 January 2025
15:00

(1 BP) Colchester	34 – 55	Bury St Edmunds (1 BP)

Raven Park
Attendance: 821
Referee: Tom Evans-Jones

25 January 2025
15:00

Guernsey Raiders	P – P	Tonbridge Juddians

Footes Lane

- Postponed due to waterlogged pitch. Game to be rescheduled for 29 March 2025.

25 January 2025
15:00

Havant	5 – 61	Canterbury (1 BP)

Hook's Lane
Attendance: 891
Referee: Peter Buchanan

25 January 2025
15:00

(1 BP) Oxford Harlequins	28 – 55	Westcombe Park (1 BP)

Horspath Sports Ground
Attendance: 189
Referee: Conor Boyle

=== Rounds 11 & 15 (rescheduled games) ===
1 February 2025
14:00

(1 BP) Dorking	40 – 20	Guernsey Raiders

The Big Field
Attendance: 356
Referee: Alex Powdrell

- Game rescheduled from 23 November 2024.

1 February 2025
15:00

(2 BP) Worthing Raiders	25 – 29	Canterbury (1 BP)

Roundstone Lane
Attendance: 148
Referee: Alex Rose

- Game rescheduled from 11 January 2025.

1 February 2025
15:00

(1 BP) Henley Hawks	8 – 12	Westcombe Park

Dry Leas
Attendance: 227
Referee: Alan Chandrachud

- Game rescheduled from 11 January 2025.

1 February 2025
15:00

(1 BP) Sevenoaks	17 – 24	Tonbridge Juddians (1 BP)

Knole Paddock
Attendance: 570
Referee: Jack Sutton

- Game rescheduled from 11 January 2025.

=== Round 18 ===
8 February 2025
14:00

(1 BP) Barnes	24 – 14	Guernsey Raiders

Barn Elms
Attendance: 194
Referee: Simon Waite

8 February 2025
14:00

(1 BP) Tonbridge Juddians	39 – 16	Havant

The Slade
Attendance: 175
Referee: Peter Buchanan

8 February 2025
14:00

Westcombe Park	22 – 18	Canterbury (1 BP)

Goddington Dene
Attendance: 145
Referee: Tom Bird

8 February 2025
14:30

(1 BP) Oxford Harlequins	48 – 24	Dorking (1 BP)

Horspath Sports Ground
Attendance: 128
Referee: George Jones

8 February 2025
15:00

(2 BP) Bury St Edmunds	36 – 38	Sevenoaks (1 BP)

The Haberden
Attendance: 327
Referee: Jack Sutton

8 February 2025
15:00

(1 BP) Henley Hawks	34 – 19	Colchester

Dry Leas
Attendance: 236
Referee: Alex Powdrell

8 February 2025
15:00

(1 BP) Old Albanian	36 – 34	Worthing Raiders (2 BP)

Woollam's Playing Fields
Attendance: 275
Referee: Conor Boyle

=== Round 19 ===
15 February 2025
14:00

(1 BP) Guernsey Raiders	21 – 28	Old Albanian (1 BP)

Footes Lane
Attendance: 478
Referee: Peter Buchanan

15 February 2025
14:00

(1 BP) Worthing Raiders	38 – 35	Bury St Edmunds (2 BP)

Roundstone Lane
Attendance: 152 (Note: The Rugby Paper gave two attendance figures for Worthing's home game versus Bury St Edmunds on 15 February 2025 - 367 on the match report and 152 on the results page. The smaller figure has been included as it is nearer to Worthing's average.)
Referee: Tom Bird

15 February 2025
14:30

(1 BP) Dorking	45 – 23	Westcombe Park

The Big Field
Attendance: 385
Referee: Alex Powdrell

15 February 2025
14:30

Sevenoaks	24 – 22	Henley Hawks (1 BP)

Knole Paddock
Attendance: 384
Referee: Harry Parsons

15 February 2025
15:00

Canterbury	23 – 46	Tonbridge Juddians (1 BP)

Marine Travel Ground
Attendance: 300
Referee: Jack Sutton

15 February 2025
15:00

(2 BP) Colchester	34 – 40	Oxford Harlequins (1 BP)

Raven Park
Attendance: 598
Referee: Simon Waite

15 February 2025
15:00

(2 BP) Havant	29 – 36	Barnes (1 BP)

Hook's Lane
Attendance: 1,018
Referee: George Jones

=== Rounds 12 & 15 (rescheduled) ===
22 February 2025
14:00

(2 BP) Guernsey Raiders	36 – 38	Colchester (1 BP)

Footes Lane
Attendance: 700
Referee: Jack Sutton

- Rescheduled from 7 December 2024.

22 February 2025
15:00

Dorking	17 – 29	Old Albanian (1 BP)

The Big Field
Attendance: 389
Referee: Simon Waite

- Rescheduled from 11 January 2025.

=== Round 20 ===
1 March 2025
14:00

(1 BP) Barnes	45 – 35	Canterbury (1 BP)

Barn Elms
Attendance: 134
Referee: Nathan Howarth

1 March 2025
14:00

(2 BP) Westcombe Park	20 – 25	Tonbridge Juddians (1 BP)

Goddington Dene
Attendance: 270
Referee: Philip Russell

1 March 2025
15:00

(1 BP) Bury St Edmunds	32 – 25	Guernsey Raiders (2 BP)

The Haberden
Attendance: 473
Referee: Harry Parsons

1 March 2025
15:00

(1 BP) Dorking	42 – 26	Colchester (1 BP)

The Big Field
Attendance: 376
Referee: Conor Boyle

1 March 2025
15:00

(1 BP) Henley Hawks	36 – 19	Worthing Raiders

Dry Leas
Attendance: 320
Referee: Simon Waite

1 March 2025
15:00

(1 BP) Old Albanian	44 – 30	Havant (1 BP)

Woollam's Playing Fields
Attendance: 219
Referee: Matthew Sharpe

1 March 2025
15:00

(1 BP) Oxford Harlequins	43 – 33	Sevenoaks (1 BP)

Horspath Sports Ground
Attendance: 172
Referee: Tom Bird

=== Round 21 ===
8 March 2025
14:00

(2 BP) Worthing Raiders	35 – 36	Oxford Harlequins (1 BP)

Roundstone Lane
Attendance: 254
Referee: Harry Parsons

8 March 2025
15:00

(1 BP) Canterbury	18 – 21	Old Albanian

Marine Travel Ground
Attendance: 400
Referee: Simon Waite

8 March 2025
15:00

(1 BP) Colchester	45 – 41	Westcombe Park (2 BP)

Raven Park
Attendance: 485
Referee: Peter Buchanan

8 March 2025
15:00

(1 BP) Guernsey Raiders	45 – 38	Henley Hawks (2 BP)

Footes Lane
Attendance: 658
Referee: Conor Boyle

8 March 2025
15:00

(2 BP) Havant	32 – 35	Bury St Edmunds (1 BP)

Hook's Lane
Attendance: 836
Referee: Tom Bird

8 March 2025
15:00

Sevenoaks	5 – 27	Dorking (1 BP)

Knole Paddock
Attendance: 280
Referee: Philip Russell

8 March 2025
15:00

Tonbridge Juddians	23 – 32	Barnes (1 BP)

The Slade
Attendance: 412
Referee: Samuel Yates

=== Round 22 ===
15 March 2025
14:00

(1 BP) Oxford Harlequins	34 – 49	Guernsey Raiders (1 BP)

Horspath Sports Ground
Attendance: 192
Referee: George Jones

15 March 2025
14:00

Westcombe Park	24 – 19	Barnes (1 BP)

Goddington Dene
Attendance: 200
Referee: Alex Rose

15 March 2025
15:00

(2 BP) Bury St Edmunds	38 – 40	Canterbury (1 BP)

The Haberden
Attendance: 625
Referee: Jack Sutton

15 March 2025
15:00

(1 BP) Dorking	65 – 12	Worthing Raiders

The Big Field
Attendance: 410
Referee: Peter Buchanan

15 March 2025
15:00

(2 BP) Colchester	23 – 27	Sevenoaks (1 BP)

Raven Park
Attendance: 345
Referee: Harry Parsons

15 March 2025
15:00

Henley Hawks	20 – 13	Havant (1 BP)

Dry Leas
Attendance: 285
Referee: Rebecca Piddlesden

15 March 2025
15:00

(1 BP) Old Albanian	29 – 28	Tonbridge Juddians (2 BP)

Woollam's Playing Fields
Attendance: 312
Referee: Conor Boyle

=== Round 23 ===
22 March 2025
14:00

(2 BP) Barnes	24 – 26	Old Albanian (1 BP)

Barn Elms
Attendance: 240
Referee: Daniel Rowlands

22 March 2025
14:00

(2 BP) Guernsey Raiders	29 – 31	Dorking (1 BP)

Footes Lane
Attendance: 700
Referee: Simon Waite

22 March 2025
15:00

(1 BP) Canterbury	31 – 28	Henley Hawks (1 BP)

Marine Travel Ground
Attendance: 410
Referee: Tom Bird

22 March 2025
15:00

Havant	25 – 19	Oxford Harlequins (1 BP)

Hook's Lane
Attendance: 1,204
Referee: Alex Powdrell

22 March 2025
15:00

(1 BP) Sevenoaks	28 – 41	Westcombe Park (1 BP)

Knole Paddock
Attendance: 465
Referee: Harry Parsons

22 March 2025
15:00

(1 BP) Tonbridge Juddians	41 – 34	Bury St Edmunds (2 BP)

The Slade
Attendance: 359
Referee: Philip Russell

22 March 2025
15:00

(1 BP) Worthing Raiders	32 – 24	Colchester (1 BP)

Roundstone Lane
Attendance: 348
Referee: Alex Rose

=== Round 17 (rescheduled game) ===
29 March 2025
14:00

Guernsey Raiders	21 – 49	Tonbridge Juddians (1 BP)

Footes Lane
Attendance: 467
Referee: Jack Sutton

- Game rescheduled from 25 January 2025.

=== Round 24 ===
5 April 2025
13:30

Colchester	21 – 29	Guernsey Raiders (1 BP)

Raven Park
Attendance: 493
Referee: Philip Russell

- Colchester are relegated due to results in other tier 4 leagues meaning they could not finish as the best ranked 13th placed side.

5 April 2025
15:00

(1 BP) Bury St Edmunds	31 – 41	Barnes (1 BP)

The Haberden
Attendance: 361
Referee: Alex Powdrell

5 April 2025
15:00

(1 BP) Dorking	43 – 17	Havant

The Big Field
Attendance: 450
Referee: Conor Boyle

5 April 2025
15:00

(1 BP) Henley Hawks	34 – 50	Tonbridge Juddians (1 BP)

Dry Leas
Attendance: 331
Referee: James Walker

5 April 2025
15:00

(1 BP) Oxford Harlequins	29 – 66	Canterbury (1 BP)

Horspath Sports Ground
Attendance: 354
Referee: Holly Wood

5 April 2025
15:00

(1 BP) Sevenoaks	38 – 29	Worthing Raiders (1 BP)

Knole Paddock
Attendance: 523
Referee: Tom Bird

- Worthing Raiders are relegated due to results in other tier 4 leagues meaning they could not finish as the best ranked 13th placed side.

5 April 2025
15:00

(2 BP) Westcombe Park	48 – 50	Old Albanian (1 BP)

Goddington Dene
Attendance: 350
Referee: George Jones

=== Round 25 ===
12 April 2025
14:00

(1 BP) Guernsey Raiders	34 – 29	Sevenoaks (2 BP)

Footes Lane
Attendance: 480
Referee: Samuel Yates

12 April 2025
15:00

(1 BP) Barnes	19 – 21	Henley Hawks

Barn Elms
Attendance: 228
Referee: Michael Lamb

12 April 2025
15:00

(1 BP) Canterbury	42 – 35	Dorking (2 BP)

Marine Travel Ground
Attendance: 700
Referee: Jack Moorhouse

12 April 2025
15:00

(1 BP) Havant	38 – 12	Colchester

Hook's Lane
Attendance: 1,138
Referee: Callum Watson

12 April 2025
15:00

(2 BP) Old Albanian	36 – 38	Bury St Edmunds (1 BP)

Woollam's Playing Fields
Attendance: 319
Referee: Max Marshall

12 April 2025
15:00

(1 BP) Tonbridge Juddians	69 – 19	Oxford Harlequins

The Slade
Attendance: 1,021
Referee: George Jones

- Tonbridge Juddians are champions.

12 April 2025
15:00

(1 BP) Worthing Raiders	40 – 52	Westcombe Park (1 BP)

Roundstone Lane
Attendance: 322
Referee: Alex Rose

=== Round 26 ===
26 April 2025
15:00

(1 BP) Bury St Edmunds	38 – 50	Westcombe Park (1 BP)

The Haberden
Attendance: 613
Referee: Philip Russell

26 April 2025
15:00

(1 BP) Colchester	33 – 50	Canterbury (1 BP)

Raven Park
Attendance: 403
Referee: Max Marshall

26 April 2025
15:00

(1 BP) Dorking	41 – 19	Tonbridge Juddians

The Big Field
Attendance: 1,049
Referee: Alex Powdrell

26 April 2025
15:00

(1 BP) Henley Hawks	45 – 26	Old Albanian (1 BP)

Dry Leas
Attendance: 412
Referee: Rebecca Piddlesden

26 April 2025
15:00

(1 BP) Oxford Harlequins	29 – 47	Barnes (1 BP)

Horspath Sports Ground
Attendance: 456
Referee: Simon Waite

26 April 2025
15:00

(1 BP) Sevenoaks	33 – 26	Havant (2 BP)

Knole Paddock
Attendance: 425
Referee: Peter Buchanan

26 April 2025
15:00

(1 BP) Worthing Raiders	26 – 71	Guernsey Raiders (1 BP)

Roundstone Lane
Attendance: 401
Referee: Conor Boyle

== Attendances ==
Club	Home Games	Total	Average	Highest	Lowest	% Capacity
Barnes	13	2,661	205	287	134	20%
Bury St Edmunds	13	6,043	465	875	235	15%
Canterbury	13	5,512	424	700	250	28%
Colchester	13	5,749	442	821	340	37%
Dorking	13	6,138	472	1,049	356	31%
Guernsey Raiders	13	7,732	595	887	421	12%
Havant	13	11,033	849	1,204	339	57%
Henley Hawks	13	4,058	312	427	187	8%
Old Albanian	13	3,545	273	393	182	27%
Oxford Harlequins	13	2,885	222	456	110	22%
Sevenoaks	13	5,459	420	570	280	42%
Tonbridge Juddians	13	5,072	390	1,021	110	26%
Westcombe Park	13	2,945	227	350	110	7%
Worthing Raiders	13	3,801	292	512	148	19%

== Individual statistics ==
=== Top points scorers ===
Rank	Player	Team	Points
1	Frank Reynolds	Canterbury	304
2	Ciaran McGann	Guernsey Raiders	244
3	Joel Knight	Havant	206
4	Sam Jones	Old Albanian	190
5	Max Titchener	Henley Hawks	183
6	Henry Anscombe	Dorking	169
7	Nathan Wyman	Westcombe Park	165
8	Sam Evans	Tonbridge Juddians	158
9	Benjamin Adams	Sevenoaks	156
10	Anthony Armstrong	Guernsey Raiders	130

=== Top try scorers ===
Rank	Player	Team	Tries
1	Curtis Barnes	Tonbridge Juddians	29
2	Anthony Armstrong	Guernsey Raiders	26
3	Jacques Birch	Barnes	23
4	Eoin O'Donoghue	Canterbury	22
5	Alex Earnshaw	Bury St Edmunds	21
5	Tobermory McRae	Dorking	21
5	William Metcalfe	Bury St Edmunds	21
6	Garry Jones	Canterbury	20
6	Alex Noot	Old Albanian	20
7	Samir Kharbouch	Bury St Edmunds	18

== See also ==
- 2024–25 National League 1
- 2024–25 National League 2 North
- 2024–25 National League 2 West
