= 2024–25 National League 2 North =

Rugby union competition in England

- Countries: England
- Date: 7 September 2024 – 26 April 2025
- Champions: Leeds (1st title)
- Runners-up: Sheffield
- Relegated: Harrogate (Note: Normally two sides would be relegated from National League 2 North but due to reorganisation of the RFU Championship for the 2025–26 season, one 13th placed side from tier 4 would be exempt from relegation, which ended up being Billingham due to a superior record to their counterparts in National 2 East and National 2 West.)
- Matches played: 182
- Attendance: 72,312 (average 397 per match)
- Highest attendance: 2,125 – Sheffield v Sheffield Tigers, 20 December 2024
- Lowest attendance: 100 (2) – Harrogate v Sheffield, 1 February 2025, Harrogate v Fylde, 15 February 2025
- Tries scored: 1491 (average 8.2 per match)
- Top point scorer: 331 – Lewis Minikin (Hull Ionians)
- Top try scorer: 27 – Christian Hooper (Sheffield)

The 2024–25 National League 2 North was the 37th season of the fourth-tier (north) of the English domestic rugby union competitions; one of three at this level. The others are National League 2 East and National League 2 West.

Leeds Tykes finished the season as champions on 5 April with two games to go, following their away victory against Sheffield Tigers whilst nearest challengers Sheffield lost at Lymm. Leeds would be promoted back into the 2025–26 National League 1 after an absence of two seasons. While the title battle had been relatively close for the majority of the season, with three sides in close contention, in the end it was fairly comfortable for Tykes who finished 8 points clear of runners up Sheffield and 21 points ahead of 3rd placed Lymm.

The relegation battle was extremely keenly fought with four teams facing the drop by the final game. In the end it was Harrogate who were the unlucky side, despite a 48 – 35 victory against relegation rivals, Billingham, due to Billingham getting a try bonus and Preston Grasshoppers and Hull winning their respective games. Harrogate would finish with 52 points equal with Billingham but would go down as they had less wins - 6 to Billingham's 9.

Billingham were extra fortunate as normally they would have been relegated due to finishing second from bottom, but reorganisation of the RFU Championship expanding to 14 teams for the 2025–26 season, meant that the best ranked 13th placed team in National 2 would stay up, and Billingham did this comfortably with 52 points keeping them up at the expense of Bournville (National 2 West - 41 points) Colchester (National 2 East - 34 points).

== Structure ==
The league consists of fourteen teams and each play the others on a home and away basis, to make a total of 26 matches each. The champions are promoted to National League 1 and the last two teams are relegated to Regional 1 North East or Regional 1 North West; depending on their location.

The results of the matches contribute points to the league as follows:

- 4 points are awarded for a win
- 2 points are awarded for a draw
- 0 points are awarded for a loss, however
- 1 losing (bonus) point is awarded to a team that loses a match by 7 points or fewer
- 1 additional (bonus) point is awarded to a team scoring 4 tries or more in a match.

Earlier in the season it had been indicated that the RFU Championship was due to increase from 12 to 14 teams for 2025–26. This was finally confirmed by the RFU with most of the season completed, and the subsequent league restructuring meant that one team per league level would have a reprieve from relegation, meaning that the best ranked 13th place team in National League 2 East, National League 2 North or National League 2 West would stay up at the end of 2024–25.

=== Participating teams and locations ===
Team	Ground	Capacity	City/Area	Previous season
Billingham	Greenwood Road	1,500 (100 seats)	Billingham, County Durham	12th
Chester	Hare Lane	2,000 (500 seats)	Chester, Cheshire	Transferred from National League 2 West (11th)
Fylde	Woodlands Memorial Ground	7,500 (500 seats)	Lytham St. Annes, Lancashire	5th
Harrogate	Rudding Lane	2,000	Harrogate, North Yorkshire	Promoted from Regional 1 North East (Champions)
Hull	Ferens Ground	1,500 (288 seats)	Kingston upon Hull, East Riding	8th
Hull Ionians	Brantingham Park	1,500 (240 seats)	Brantingham, East Riding	13th
Leeds Tykes	The Sycamores (Note: Leeds Tykes will also play one home game at the 19,700 capacity Headingley Stadium in Leeds.)	1,500	Bramhope, Leeds, West Yorkshire	Runners up
Lymm	Crouchley Lane	1,000	Lymm, Cheshire	10th
Otley	Cross Green	7,000 (852 seats)	Otley, Leeds, West Yorkshire	9th
Preston Grasshoppers	Lightfoot Green	2,250 (250 seats)	Preston, Lancashire	11th
Sheffield	Abbeydale Park	3,200 (100 seats)	Sheffield, South Yorkshire	3rd
Sheffield Tigers	Dore Moor	1,000	Sheffield, South Yorkshire	7th
Tynedale	Tynedale Park	2,000 (400 seats)	Corbridge, Northumberland	6th
Wharfedale	The Avenue	2,000	Threshfield, North Yorkshire	4th

Locations of the 2024–25 National League 2 North teams

== League table ==
2024–25 National League 2 North table
Pos	Team	Pld	W	D	L	PF	PA	PD	TB	LB	Pts	Qualification
1	Leeds Tykes (C)	26	24	0	2	880	498	+382	22	1	119	Promotion place
2	Sheffield	26	22	0	4	933	523	+410	21	2	111	
3	Lymm	26	19	0	7	915	737	+178	22	0	98	
4	Fylde	26	15	0	11	777	661	+116	17	6	83	
5	Tynedale	26	12	3	11	741	787	−46	17	5	76	
6	Wharfedale	26	13	0	13	680	712	−32	16	2	70	
7	Hull Ionians	26	10	0	16	762	811	−49	14	9	63	
8	Sheffield Tigers	26	9	1	16	651	677	−26	14	11	63	
9	Chester	26	11	0	15	758	835	−77	13	5	62	
10	Otley	26	10	1	15	696	791	−95	11	6	59	
11	Hull	26	10	0	16	663	849	−186	12	3	55	
12	Preston Grasshoppers	26	8	1	17	689	856	−167	14	6	54	
13	Billingham	26	9	1	16	615	808	−193	12	2	52	
14	Harrogate (R)	26	6	1	19	652	867	−215	16	10	52	Relegation place

Updated to match(es) played on 26 April 2025. Source: National League Rugby
Rules for classification: If teams are level at any stage, tiebreakers are applied in the following order:
1. Number of matches won
2. Number of matches drawn
3. Difference between points for and against
4. Total number of points for
5. Aggregate number of points scored in matches between tied teams
6. Number of matches won excluding the first match, then the second and so on until the tie is settled

== Fixtures & results ==
Fixtures for the season were published by the RFU on 31 May 2025.

=== Round 1 ===
7 September 2024
14:00

(1 BP) Hull	12 – 13	Otley

Ferens Ground
Attendance: 275
Referee: Jack Moorhouse

7 September 2024
14:00

(1 BP) Wharfedale	22 – 8	Sheffield Tigers

The Avenue
Attendance: 340
Referee: Michael Harris

7 September 2024
14:15

(1 BP) Billingham	33 – 12	Harrogate

Greenwood Road
Attendance: 439
Referee: David Charlton

7 September 2024
14:30

(2 BP) Preston Grasshoppers	30 – 32	Chester (1 BP)

Lightfoot Green
Attendance: 267
Referee: Daniel Woods

7 September 2024
15:00

Hull Ionians	27 – 39	Lymm (1 BP)

Brantingham Park
Attendance: 360
Referee: Sam Yates

7 September 2024
15:00

(1 BP) Leeds Tykes	47 – 5	Tynedale

The Sycamores
Attendance: 347
Referee: George Ounsley

7 September 2024
15:00

(1 BP) Sheffield	38 – 19	Fylde

Abbeydale Park
Attendance: 168
Referee: Peter Connor

=== Round 2 ===
14 September 2024
14:00

Hull	18 – 55	Hull Ionians (1 BP)

Ferens Ground
Attendance: 457
Referee: Henry Pearson

14 September 2024
15:00

Chester	19 – 51	Lymm (1 BP)

Hare Lane
Attendance: 375
Referee: Jack Moorhouse

14 September 2024
15:00

(1 BP) Fylde	22 – 20	Preston Grasshoppers (1 BP)

Woodlands Memorial Ground
Attendance: 1,490
Referee: Sam Yates

14 September 2024
15:00

(2 BP) Harrogate	29 – 35	Wharfedale (1 BP)

Rudding Lane
Attendance: 200
Referee: Michael Harris

14 September 2024
15:00

(1 BP) Otley	20 – 24	Leeds Tykes (1 BP)

Cross Green
Attendance: 498
Referee: Nikki O'Donnell

14 September 2024
15:00

Sheffield Tigers	13 – 22	Sheffield

Dore Moor
Attendance: 334
Referee: George Oundsley

14 September 2024
15:00

Tynedale	19 – 19	Billingham

Tynedale Park
Attendance: 220
Referee: Nathan Howarth

=== Round 3 ===
21 September 2024
14:00

(1 BP) Wharfedale	34 – 28	Tynedale (2 BP)

The Avenue
Attendance: 300
Referee: Daniel Woods

21 September 2024
14:15

Billingham	19 – 17	Otley (1 BP)

Greenwood Road
Attendance: 356
Referee: Michael Harris

21 September 2024
14:30

(1 BP) Lymm	49 – 14	Fylde

Crouchley Lane
Attendance: 261
Referee: Llyr ApGeraint-Roberts

21 September 2024
14:30

(1 BP) Preston Grasshoppers	27 – 26	Sheffield Tigers (1 BP)

Lightfoot Green
Attendance: 207
Referee: Jack Moorhouse

21 September 2024
15:00

(1 BP) Hull Ionians	30 – 19	Chester

Brantingham Park
Attendance: 259
Referee: David Charlton

21 September 2024
15:00

(1 BP) Leeds Tykes	49 – 16	Hull

The Sycamores
Attendance: 371
Referee: Sam Yates

21 September 2024
15:00

(1 BP) Sheffield	57 – 19	Harrogate

Abbeydale Park
Attendance: 350
Referee: Peter Connor

=== Round 4 ===
28 September 2024
14:00

(1 BP) Hull	40 – 26	Billingham (1 BP)

Ferens Ground
Attendance: 224
Referee: Jack Moorhouse

28 September 2024
15:00

(1 BP) Fylde	47 – 24	Chester (1 BP)

Woodlands Memorial Ground
Attendance: 1,080
Referee: George Ounsley

28 September 2024
15:00

(2 BP) Harrogate	31 – 38	Preston Grasshoppers (1 BP)

Rudding Lane
Attendance: 150
Referee: David Charlton

28 September 2024
15:00

(1 BP) Otley	44 – 31	Wharfedale (1 BP)

Cross Green
Attendance: 526
Referee: Sam Yates

28 September 2024
15:00

(2 BP) Sheffield Tigers	27 – 28	Lymm (1 BP)

Dore Moor
Attendance: 189
Referee: Nikki O'Donnell

28 September 2024
15:00

Tynedale	7 – 38	Sheffield (1 BP)

Tynedale Park
Attendance: 430
Referee: Gavin Jones

28 September 2024
16:00

(1 BP) Leeds Tykes	37 – 25	Hull Ionians (1 BP)

The Sycamores
Attendance: 438
Referee: Owen Taylor

=== Round 5 ===
5 October 2024
14:00

(1 BP) Wharfedale	24 – 34	Hull (1 BP)

The Avenue
Attendance: 421
Referee: David Charlton

5 October 2024
14:15

Billingham	14 – 33	Leeds Tykes (1 BP)

Greenwood Road
Attendance: 492
Referee: Henry Pearson

5 October 2024
14:30

(1 BP) Lymm	57 – 24	Harrogate (1 BP)

Crouchley Lane
Attendance: 350
Referee: Michael Harris

5 October 2024
14:30

Preston Grasshoppers	31 – 31	Tynedale (1 BP)

Lightfoot Green
Attendance: 317
Referee: Sam Yates

5 October 2024
15:00

(1 BP) Chester	59 – 17	Sheffield Tigers

Hare Lane
Attendance: 310
Referee: Llyr ApGeraint-Roberts

5 October 2024
15:00

(2 BP) Hull Ionians	32 – 35	Fylde (1 BP)

Brantingham Park
Attendance: 265
Referee: Nathan Howarth

5 October 2024
15:00

(1 BP) Sheffield	38 – 15	Otley

Abbeydale Park
Attendance: 411
Referee: George Ounsley

=== Round 6 ===
11 October 2024
20:00

(1 BP) Leeds Tykes	33 – 12	Wharfedale

The Sycamores
Attendance: 817
Referee: Jack Moorhouse

12 October 2024
14:00

(2 BP) Hull	36 – 38	Sheffield (1 BP)

Ferens Ground
Attendance: 157
Referee: Michael Harris

12 October 2024
14:15

Billingham	27 – 12	Hull Ionians

Greenwood Road
Attendance: 369
Referee: Sam Yates

12 October 2024
15:00

Harrogate	22 – 16	Chester (1 BP)

Rudding Lane
Attendance: 150
Referee: Peter Connor

12 October 2024
15:00

(1 BP) Otley	45 – 22	Preston Grasshoppers

Cross Green
Attendance: 320
Referee: Gavin Jones

12 October 2024
15:00

(2 BP) Sheffield Tigers	26 – 33	Fylde (1 BP)

Dore Moor
Attendance: 214
Referee: David Charlton

12 October 2024
15:00

(2 BP) Tynedale	32 – 37	Lymm (1 BP)

Tynedale Park
Attendance: 375
Referee: George Ounsley

=== Round 7 ===
19 October 2024
14:00

(1 BP) Wharfedale	40 – 17	Billingham

The Avenue
Attendance: 610
Referee: Nathan Howarth

19 October 2024
14:30

(1 BP) Preston Grasshoppers	45 – 29	Hull (1 BP)

Lightfoot Green
Attendance: 377
Referee: George Ounsley

19 October 2024
14:30

(1 BP) Lymm	53 – 22	Otley

Crouchley Lane
Attendance: 280
Referee: Sam Yates

19 October 2024
15:00

(1 BP) Chester	46 – 19	Tynedale

Hare Lane
Attendance: 300
Referee: David Charlton

19 October 2024
15:00

(1 BP) Fylde	61 – 14	Harrogate

Woodlands Memorial Ground
Attendance: 549
Referee: Gavin Jones

19 October 2024
15:00

(1 BP) Hull Ionians	33 – 20	Sheffield Tigers

Brantingham Park
Attendance: 212
Referee: Michael Harris

19 October 2024
15:00

(1 BP) Sheffield	12 – 13	Leeds Tykes

Abbeydale Park
Attendance: 751
Referee: Henry Pearson

=== Round 8 ===
26 October 2024
14:00

(1 BP) Hull	18 – 24	Lymm (1 BP)

Ferens Ground
Attendance: 154
Referee: Peter Connor

26 October 2024
14:00

(1 BP) Wharfedale	30 – 24	Hull Ionians (1 BP)

The Avenue
Attendance: 583
Referee: George Ounsley

26 October 2024
14:15

Billingham	10 – 45	Sheffield (1 BP)

Greenwood Road
Attendance: 417
Referee: Gavin Jones

26 October 2024
15:00

(2 BP) Harrogate	33 – 34	Sheffield Tigers (1 BP)

Rudding Lane
Attendance: 200
Referee: Alex Powdrell

26 October 2024
15:00

(1 BP) Leeds Tykes	35 – 29	Preston Grasshoppers (2 BP)

The Sycamores
Attendance: 485
Referee: Daniel Woods

26 October 2024
15:00

Otley	19 – 14	Chester (1 BP)

Cross Green
Attendance: 402
Referee: Nathan Howarth

26 October 2024
15:00

(1 BP) Tynedale	22 – 45	Fylde (1 BP)

Tynedale Park
Attendance: 550
Referee: Sam Yates

=== Round 9 ===
9 November 2024
14:00

Hull Ionians	25 – 23	Harrogate (1 BP)

Brantingham Park
Attendance: 302
Referee: Daniel Woods

9 November 2024
14:00

(2 BP) Sheffield Tigers	24 – 29	Tynedale (1 BP)

Dore Moor
Attendance: 189
Referee: Peter Connor

9 November 2024
14:30

(1 BP) Lymm	30 – 26	Leeds Tykes (2 BP)

Crouchley Lane
Attendance: 445
Referee: George Ounsley

9 November 2024
14:30

(1 BP) Preston Grasshoppers	48 – 22	Billingham (1 BP)

Lightfoot Green
Attendance: 375
Referee: James Walker

9 November 2024
15:00

(1 BP) Chester	39 – 19	Hull

Hare Lane
Attendance: 240
Referee: Michael Harris

9 November 2024
15:00

(1 BP) Fylde	56 – 29	Otley (1 BP)

Woodlands Memorial Ground
Attendance: 550
Referee: Nathan Howarth

9 November 2024
15:00

(1 BP) Sheffield	43 – 20	Wharfedale

Abbeydale Park
Attendance: 311
Referee: Nikki O'Donnell

=== Round 10 ===
16 November 2024
14:00

Hull	23 – 21	Fylde (1 BP)

Ferens Ground
Attendance: 235
Referee: George Ounsley

16 November 2024
14:00

(1 BP) Wharfedale	40 – 14	Preston Grasshoppers

The Avenue
Attendance: 595
Referee: Llyr ApGeraint-Roberts

16 November 2024
14:00

(1 BP) Tynedale	33 – 33	Harrogate (1 BP)

Tynedale Park
Attendance: 550
Referee: Gavin Jones

16 November 2024
14:15

(1 BP) Billingham	26 – 36	Lymm (1 BP)

Greenwood Road
Attendance: 310
Referee: Mick Harris

16 November 2024
14:15

Otley	24 – 24	Sheffield Tigers (1 BP)

Cross Green
Attendance: 271
Referee: Daniel Woods

16 November 2024
14:15

(1 BP) Sheffield	40 – 33	Hull Ionians (2 BP)

Abbeydale Park
Attendance: 208
Referee: Jack Moorhouse

16 November 2024
14:30

(1 BP) Leeds Tykes	75 – 31	Chester (1 BP)

The Sycamores
Attendance: 395
Referee: David Charlton

=== Round 11 ===
23 November 2024
14:00

Harrogate	P – P	Otley

Rudding Lane

- Postponed due to snow. Game to be rescheduled for 30 November 2024.

23 November 2024
14:00

(1 BP) Hull Ionians	12 – 16	Tynedale

Brantingham Park
Attendance: 283
Referee: Daniel Woods

23 November 2024
14:00

Sheffield Tigers	P – P	Hull

Dore Moor

- Postponed due to recent bad weather (snow, followed by wind and rain). Game to be rescheduled for 30 November 2024.

23 November 2024
14:30

(1 BP) Lymm	26 – 0	Wharfedale

Crouchley Lane
Attendance: 339
Referee: Gavin Jones

23 November 2024
14:30

Preston Grasshoppers	17 – 25	Sheffield (1 BP)

Lightfoot Green
Attendance: 257
Referee: David Charlton

23 November 2024
15:00

(1 BP) Chester	47 – 22	Billingham

Hare Lane
Attendance: 250
Referee: Andy Shaw

23 November 2024
15:00

Fylde	P – P	Leeds Tykes

Woodlands Memorial Ground

- Postponed due to waterlogged pitch. Game to be rescheduled for 30 November 2024.

=== Round 11 (rescheduled games) ===
30 November 2024
14:00

(1 BP) Harrogate	39 – 7	Otley

Rudding Lane
Attendance: 250
Referee: George Ounsley

- Game rescheduled from 23 November 2024.

30 November 2024
14:00

Sheffield Tigers	29 – 15	Hull

Dore Moor
Attendance: 150
Referee: Nathan Howarth

- Game rescheduled from 23 November 2024.

30 November 2024
15:00

(1 BP) Fylde	17 – 22	Leeds Tykes (1 BP)

Woodlands Memorial Ground
Attendance: 432
Referee: Jack Moorhouse

- Game rescheduled from 23 November 2024.

=== Round 12 ===
7 December 2024
14:00

(1 BP) Hull	29 – 12	Harrogate

Ferens Ground
Attendance: 124
Referee: Michael Harris

7 December 2024
14:00

(1 BP) Wharfedale	22 – 19	Chester (1 BP)

The Avenue
Attendance: 309
Referee: Daniel Woods

7 December 2024
14:15

Billingham	A – A	Fylde

Greenwood Road
Referee: Nathan Howarth

- Game abandoned at half time with Billingham leading 5-0, due to adverse weather conditions. Game to be rescheduled for 1 February 2025.

7 December 2024
14:15

(1 BP) Otley	26 – 41	Tynedale (1 BP)

Cross Green
Attendance: 126
Referee: David Charlton

7 December 2024
14:15

(1 BP) Sheffield	24 – 5	Lymm

Abbeydale Park
Attendance: 375
Referee: Jack Moorhouse

7 December 2024
14:30

Leeds Tykes	12 – 11	Sheffield Tigers (1 BP)

The Sycamores
Attendance: 220
Referee: Owen Taylor

7 December 2024
14:30

Preston Grasshoppers	0 – 39	Hull Ionians (1 BP)

Lightfoot Green
Attendance: 350
Referee: George Ounsley

=== Round 13 ===
14 December 2024
14:00

(1 BP) Harrogate	22 – 47	Leeds Tykes (1 BP)

Rudding Lane
Attendance: 400
Referee: David Charlton

14 December 2024
14:00

(1 BP) Otley	36 – 35	Hull Ionians (2 BP)

Cross Green
Attendance: 251
Referee: Michael Harris

14 December 2024
14:00

(1 BP) Sheffield Tigers	32 – 12	Billingham

Dore Moor
Attendance: 173
Referee: Jack Moorhouse

14 December 2024
14:00

(1 BP) Tynedale	38 – 17	Hull

Tynedale Park
Attendance: 500
Referee: Nikki O'Donnell

14 December 2024
14:30

(1 BP) Lymm	42 – 29	Preston Grasshoppers (1 BP)

Crouchley Lane
Attendance: 203
Referee: Daniel Woods

14 December 2024
15:00

Chester	31 – 43	Sheffield (1 BP)

Hare Lane
Attendance: 230
Referee: Gavin Jones

14 December 2024
15:00

(1 BP) Fylde	31 – 30	Wharfedale (2 BP)

Woodlands Memorial Ground
Attendance: 1,178
Referee: George Ounsley

=== Round 14 ===
20 December 2024
19:00

Sheffield	17 – 12	Sheffield Tigers (1 BP)

Abbeydale Park
Attendance: 2,125
Referee: Llyr ApGeraint-Roberts

20 December 2024
20:00

(1 BP) Leeds Tykes	33 – 10	Otley

Headingley Stadium, Leeds
Attendance: 680
Referee: George Ounsley

21 December 2024
14:00

(2 BP) Hull Ionians	36 – 37	Hull (1 BP)

Brantingham Park
Attendance: 805
Referee: Daniel Woods

21 December 2024
14:00

Wharfedale	18 – 15	Harrogate (1 BP)

The Avenue
Attendance: 610
Referee: Samuel Yates

21 December 2024
14:15

(1 BP) Billingham	25 – 26	Tynedale (1 BP)

Greenwood Road
Attendance: 541
Referee: Michael Harris

21 December 2024
14:30

(1 BP) Lymm	52 – 26	Chester (1 BP)

Crouchley Lane
Attendance: 365
Referee: Andrew Shaw

21 December 2024
14:30

Preston Grasshoppers	12 – 38	Fylde (1 BP)

Lightfoot Green
Attendance: 1,203
Referee: Jack Moorhouse

=== Round 15 ===
11 January 2025
14:00

Harrogate	P – P	Sheffield

Rudding Lane

- Postponed due to frozen pitch. Game to be rescheduled for 1 February 2025.

11 January 2025
14:00

Hull	P – P	Leeds Tykes

Ferens Ground

- Postponed due to frozen pitch. Game to be rescheduled for 1 February 2025.

11 January 2025
14:00

Sheffield Tigers	P – P	Preston Grasshoppers

Dore Moor

- Postponed due to frozen pitch. Game to be rescheduled for 1 February 2025.

11 January 2025
14:00

Tynedale	P – P	Wharfedale

Tynedale Park

- Postponed due to frozen pitch. Game to be rescheduled for 1 February 2025.

11 January 2025
14:15

Otley	P – P	Billingham

Cross Green

- Postponed due to frozen pitch. Game to be rescheduled for 22 February 2025.

11 January 2025
15:00

Chester	P – P	Hull Ionians

Hare Lane

- Postponed due to frozen pitch. Game to be rescheduled for 1 February 2025.

11 January 2025
15:00

Fylde	P – P	Lymm

Woodlands Memorial Ground

- Postponed due to frozen pitch. Game to be rescheduled for 22 February 2025.

=== Round 16 ===
18 January 2025
14:00

(1 BP) Hull Ionians	28 – 33	Leeds Tykes (1 BP)

Brantingham Park
Attendance: 344
Referee: Jack Moorhouse

18 January 2025
14:00

(1 BP) Wharfedale	42 – 28	Otley (1 BP)

The Avenue
Attendance: 585
Referee: Michael Harris

18 January 2025
14:15

(1 BP) Billingham	34 – 17	Hull

Greenwood Road
Attendance: 312
Referee: Gavin Jones

18 January 2025
14:15

(1 BP) Sheffield	50 – 33	Tynedale (1 BP)

Abbeydale Park
Attendance: 275
Referee: Llyr ApGeraint-Roberts

18 January 2025
14:30

(1 BP) Lymm	30 – 26	Sheffield Tigers (2 BP)

Crouchley Lane
Attendance: 250
Referee: Daniel Woods

18 January 2025
14:30

(1 BP) Preston Grasshoppers	38 – 31	Harrogate (2 BP)

Lightfoot Green
Attendance: 327
Referee: David Charlton

18 January 2025
15:00

Chester	25 – 19	Fylde (1 BP)

Hare Lane
Attendance: 427
Referee: Peter Connor

=== Round 17 ===
25 January 2025
14:00

(2 BP) Harrogate	31 – 36	Lymm (1 BP)

Rudding Lane
Attendance: 150
Referee: Gavin Jones

25 January 2025
14:00

(1 BP) Hull	32 – 19	Wharfedale

Ferens Ground
Attendance: 398
Referee: George Ounsley

25 January 2025
14:00

Sheffield Tigers	19 – 14	Chester (1 BP)

Dore Moor
Attendance: 190
Referee: Nathan Howarth

25 January 2025
14:00

(1 BP) Tynedale	25 – 18	Preston Grasshoppers (1 BP)

Tynedale Park
Attendance: 435 (Note: Tynedale v Preston Grasshoppers attendance initially missing as The Rugby Paper did not publish the figure. Following contact with Tynedale RFC the attendance was found to be 435.)
Referee: Daniel Woods

25 January 2025
14:15

(1 BP) Otley	24 – 31	Sheffield (1 BP)

Cross Green
Attendance: 216
Referee: Peter Connor

25 January 2025
14:30

(1 BP) Leeds Tykes	33 – 27	Billingham (1 BP)

The Sycamores
Attendance: 428
Referee: Michael Harris

25 January 2025
15:00

(1 BP) Fylde	31 – 27	Hull Ionians (2 BP)

Woodlands Memorial Ground
Attendance: 804
Referee: David Charlton

=== Rounds 12 & 15 (rescheduled games) ===
1 February 2025
14:00

Harrogate	13 – 46	Sheffield (1 BP)

Rudding Lane
Attendance: 100
Referee: Nathan Howarth

- Game rescheduled from 11 January 2025.

1 February 2025
14:00

(1 BP) Hull	24 – 33	Leeds Tykes (1 BP)

Ferens Ground
Attendance: 234
Referee: Michael Harris

- Game rescheduled from 11 January 2025.

1 February 2025
14:00

(2 BP) Sheffield Tigers	27 – 34	Preston Grasshoppers (1 BP)

Dore Moor
Attendance: 168
Referee: Henry Pearson

- Game rescheduled from 11 January 2025.

1 February 2025
14:00

(1 BP) Tynedale	41 – 29	Wharfedale (1 BP)

Tynedale Park
Attendance: 350
Referee: David Charlton

- Game rescheduled from 11 January 2025.

1 February 2025
14:15

(1 BP) Billingham	39 – 17	Fylde

Greenwood Road
Attendance: 339
Referee: Nathan Howarth

- Game rescheduled from 7 December 2024.

1 February 2025
15:00

(1 BP) Chester	38 – 33	Hull Ionians (2 BP)

Hare Lane
Attendance: 250
Referee: George Ounsley

- Game rescheduled from 11 January 2025.

=== Round 18 ===
8 February 2025
14:00

(1 BP) Hull Ionians	40 – 26	Billingham (1 BP)

Brantingham Park
Attendance: 294
Referee: Gavin Jones

8 February 2025
14:00

(1 BP) Wharfedale	24 – 28	Leeds Tykes (1 BP)

The Avenue
Attendance: 595
Referee: Jack Moorhouse

8 February 2025
14:15

(1 BP) Sheffield	43 – 23	Hull

Abbeydale Park
Attendance: 236
Referee: Michael Harris

8 February 2025
14:30

(1 BP) Lymm	33 – 47	Tynedale (1 BP)

Crouchley Lane
Attendance: 154
Referee: Nathan Howarth

8 February 2025
14:30

(1 BP) Preston Grasshoppers	27 – 24	Otley (1 BP)

Lightfoot Green
Attendance: 273
Referee: David Charlton

8 February 2025
15:00

(1 BP) Chester	29 – 26	Harrogate (2 BP)

Hare Lane
Attendance: 230
Referee: Llyr ApGeraint-Roberts

8 February 2025
15:00

(2 BP) Fylde	28 – 32	Sheffield Tigers (1 BP)

Woodlands Memorial Ground
Attendance: 632
Referee: George Ounsley

=== Round 19 ===
15 February 2025
14:00

(1 BP) Harrogate	27 – 24	Fylde (2 BP)

Rudding Lane
Attendance: 100
Referee: Michael Harris

15 February 2025
14:00

(1 BP) Hull	41 – 24	Preston Grasshoppers (1 BP)

Ferens Ground
Attendance: 153
Referee: George Ounsley

15 February 2025
14:00

Sheffield Tigers	17 – 27	Hull Ionians

Dore Moor
Attendance: 163
Referee: Samuel Yates

15 February 2025
14:00

(2 BP) Tynedale	29 – 31	Chester (1 BP)

Tynedale Park
Attendance: 346
Referee: Gavin Jones

15 February 2025
14:15

Billingham	14 – 32	Wharfedale (1 BP)

Greenwood Road
Attendance: 361
Referee: David Charlton

15 February 2025
14:15

(1 BP) Otley	31 – 7	Lymm

Cross Green
Attendance: 278
Referee: Peter Connor

15 February 2025
14:30

Leeds Tykes	24 – 18	Sheffield (1 BP)

The Sycamores
Attendance: 538
Referee: Owen Taylor

=== Round 15 (rescheduled games) ===
22 February 2025
14:15

(1 BP) Otley	51 – 15	Billingham

Cross Green
Attendance: 283
Referee: Daniel Woods

- Game rescheduled from 11 January 2025.

22 February 2025
14:30

(1 BP) Fylde	45 – 17	Lymm

Woodlands Memorial Ground
Attendance: 711
Referee: Samuel Yates

- Game rescheduled from 11 January 2025.

=== Round 20 ===
1 March 2025
14:15

(1 BP) Sheffield	52 – 17	Billingham

Abbeydale Park
Attendance: 325
Referee: Peter Connor

1 March 2025
14:30

(1 BP) Lymm	50 – 24	Hull

Crouchley Lane
Attendance: 279
Referee: David Charlton

1 March 2025
14:30

Preston Grasshoppers	10 – 45	Leeds Tykes (1 BP)

Lightfoot Green
Attendance: 357
Referee: Michael Harris

1 March 2025
15:00

Chester	24 – 40	Otley (1 BP)

Hare Lane
Attendance: 250
Referee: Samuel Yates

1 March 2025
15:00

(1 BP) Fylde	27 – 19	Tynedale

Woodlands Memorial Ground
Attendance: 1,002
Referee: Alex Powdrell

1 March 2025
15:00

Hull Ionians	24 – 12	Wharfedale

Brantingham Park
Attendance: 416
Referee: Jack Moorhouse

1 March 2025
15:00

(1 BP) Sheffield Tigers	34 – 18	Harrogate

Dore Moor
Attendance: 223
Referee: Daniel Woods

=== Round 21 ===
8 March 2025
14:00

Hull	17 – 40	Chester (1 BP)

Ferens Ground
Attendance: 225
Referee: Daniel Woods

8 March 2025
14:00

(1 BP) Tynedale	43 – 38	Sheffield Tigers (2 BP)

Tynedale Park
Attendance: 370
Referee: Michael Harris

8 March 2025
14:00

(1 BP) Wharfedale	36 – 21	Sheffield

The Avenue
Attendance: 485
Referee: James Milliner-Woodcock

8 March 2025
14:15

(1 BP) Billingham	29 – 19	Preston Grasshoppers

Greenwood Road
Attendance: 422
Referee: Nathan Howarth

8 March 2025
15:00

(1 BP) Harrogate	35 – 23	Hull Ionians

Rudding Lane
Attendance: 200
Referee: Andrew Shaw

8 March 2025
15:00

Otley	19 – 18	Fylde (1 BP)

Cross Green
Attendance: 600
Referee: David Charlton

8 March 2025
16:00

(1 BP) Leeds Tykes	52 – 10	Lymm

The Sycamores
Attendance: 429
Referee: Jack Moorhouse

=== Round 22 ===
15 March 2025
14:30

(1 BP) Lymm	22 – 35	Billingham (1 BP)

Crouchley Lane
Attendance: 345
Referee: George Ounsley

15 March 2025
14:30

(1 BP) Preston Grasshoppers	15 – 19	Wharfedale

Lightfoot Green
Attendance: 375
Referee: David Charlton

15 March 2025
15:00

Chester	26 – 41	Leeds Tykes (1 BP)

Hare Lane
Attendance: 200
Referee: Nathan Howarth

15 March 2025
15:00

(1 BP) Fylde	35 – 13	Hull

Woodlands Memorial Ground
Attendance: 736
Referee: Thomas Hurdley

15 March 2025
15:00

(2 BP) Harrogate	31 – 33	Tynedale (1 BP)

Rudding Lane
Attendance: 150
Referee: Daniel Rowlands

15 March 2025
15:00

Hull Ionians	6 – 45	Sheffield (1 BP)

Brantingham Park
Attendance: 230
Referee: Daniel Woods

15 March 2025
15:00

(1 BP) Sheffield Tigers	38 – 23	Otley

Dore Moor
Attendance: 210
Referee: Gavin Jones

=== Round 23 ===
22 March 2025
14:00

Hull	21 – 29	Sheffield Tigers (1 BP)

Ferens Ground
Attendance: 210
Referee: Andrew Shaw

22 March 2025
14:00

(1 BP) Wharfedale	44 – 27	Lymm (1 BP)

The Avenue
Attendance: 512
Referee: Samuel Yates

22 March 2025
14:15

(1 BP) Billingham	29 – 23	Chester (1 BP)

Greenwood Road
Attendance: 446
Referee: Nicola O'Donnell

22 March 2025
14:30

(1 BP) Leeds Tykes	35 – 15	Fylde

The Sycamores
Attendance: 421
Referee: George Ounsley

22 March 2025
15:00

(1 BP) Otley	17 – 24	Harrogate (1 BP)

Cross Green
Attendance: 523
Referee: Thomas Hurdley

22 March 2025
15:00

(1 BP) Sheffield	40 – 18	Preston Grasshoppers

Abbeydale Park
Attendance: 425
Referee: Daniel Woods

22 March 2025
15:00

(2 BP) Tynedale	28 – 33	Hull Ionians

Tynedale Park
Attendance: 525
Referee: David Charlton

=== Round 24 ===
5 April 2025
14:00

(2 BP) Harrogate	26 – 31	Hull (1 BP)

Rudding Lane
Attendance: 125
Referee: Peter Connor

5 April 2025
14:30

(1 BP) Lymm	38 – 29	Sheffield (1 BP)

Crouchley Lane
Attendance: 204
Referee: Jack Moorhouse

5 April 2025
15:00

(1 BP) Chester	45 – 28	Wharfedale (1 BP)

Hare Lane
Attendance: 500
Referee: Conor Boyle

5 April 2025
15:00

(1 BP) Fylde	22 – 12	Billingham

Woodlands Memorial Ground
Attendance: 847
Referee: Dave Charlton

5 April 2025
15:00

(1 BP) Hull Ionians	53 – 52	Preston Grasshoppers (2 BP)

Brantingham Park
Attendance: 274
Referee: Michael Harris

5 April 2025
15:00

(1 BP) Sheffield Tigers	24 – 27	Leeds Tykes (1 BP)

Dore Moor
Attendance: 218
Referee: Daniel Rowlands

- Leeds Tykes are champions.

5 April 2025
15:00

(1 BP) Tynedale	54 – 22	Otley

Tynedale Park
Attendance: 425
Referee: Tom Hurdley

=== Round 25 ===
11 April 2025
20:00

(1 BP) Leeds Tykes	31 – 17	Harrogate

The Sycamores
Attendance: 1,064
Referee: Michael Harris

12 April 2025
14:00

(1 BP) Hull	29 – 22	Tynedale (1 BP)

Ferens Ground
Attendance: 343
Referee: David Charlton

12 April 2025
14:00

Wharfedale	22 – 36	Fylde (1 BP)

The Avenue
Attendance: 684
Referee: Andrew Shaw

12 April 2025
14:15

(1 BP) Billingham	31 – 28	Sheffield Tigers (1 BP)

Greenwood Road
Attendance: 794
Referee: Haydn Davies

12 April 2025
14:30

(1 BP) Preston Grasshoppers	31 – 44	Lymm (1 BP)

Lightfoot Green
Attendance: 403
Referee: George Ounsley

12 April 2025
15:00

Hull Ionians	22 – 45	Otley (1 BP)

Brantingham Park
Attendance: 354
Referee: Daniel Woods

12 April 2025
15:00

(1 BP) Sheffield	45 – 20	Chester

Abbeydale Park
Attendance: 325
Referee: Thomas Hurdley

=== Round 26 ===
26 April 2025
15:00

Chester	21 – 41	Preston Grasshoppers (1 BP)

Hare Lane
Attendance: 400
Referee: Daniel Rowlands

26 April 2025
15:00

Fylde	21 – 33	Sheffield (1 BP)

Woodlands Memorial Ground
Attendance: 912
Referee: Peter Connor

26 April 2025
15:00

(1 BP) Harrogate	48 – 35	Billingham (1 BP)

Rudding Lane
Attendance: 600 (Note: The Rugby Paper gave two attendances for Harrogate's home game versus Billingham on 26 April 2025 - 600 on the match report and 500 on the results page. As the match report specifically refers to "a season-record crowd of 600" that figure has been used.)
Referee: George Ounsley

- Harrogate are relegated following other results.

26 April 2025
15:00

(1 BP) Lymm	72 – 28	Hull Ionians (1 BP)

Crouchley Lane
Attendance: 360
Referee: Samuel Yates

26 April 2025
15:00

(2 BP) Otley	45 – 48	Hull (1 BP)

Cross Green
Attendance: 423
Referee: Michael Harris

26 April 2025
15:00

(1 BP) Sheffield Tigers	36 – 15	Wharfedale

Dore Moor
Attendance: 258
Referee: David Charlton

26 April 2025
15:00

Tynedale	21 – 12	Leeds Tykes

Tynedale Park
Attendance: 525
Referee: Gavin Jones

== Attendances ==
Club	Home Games	Total	Average	Highest	Lowest	% Capacity
Billingham	13	5,598	431	794	310	29%
Chester	13	3,962	305	500	200	15%
Fylde	13	10,923	840	1,490	432	11%
Harrogate	13	2,775	213	600	100	11%
Hull	13	3,189	245	457	124	16%
Hull Ionians	13	4,398	338	805	212	23%
Leeds Tykes	13	6,633	510	1,064	220	30%
Lymm	13	3,835	295	445	154	28%
Otley	13	4,717	363	600	126	5%
Preston Grasshoppers	13	5,088	391	1,203	207	17%
Sheffield	13	6,285	483	2,125	168	15%
Sheffield Tigers	13	2,679	206	334	150	21%
Tynedale	13	5,601	431	550	220	22%
Wharfedale	13	6,629	510	684	300	25%

== Individual statistics ==
=== Top points scorers ===
Rank	Player	Team	Points
1	Lewis Minikin	Hull Ionians	331
2	Elliot Fisher	Sheffield	222
3	Morgan Bagshaw	Chester	159
4	Fynlay Hobson	Hull	155
5	Peter Evans	Billingham	147
6	Patrick Bishop	Fylde	146
7	Gregory Smith	Preston Grasshoppers	141
7	Mark Ireland	Sheffield Tigers	141
8	William Baker	Sheffield Tigers	138
8	Joe Rowntree	Otley	138
8	Thomas Shard	Lymm	138

=== Top try scorers ===
Rank	Player	Team	Tries
1	Christian Hooper	Sheffield	27
2	Adam Brown	Leeds Tykes	24
3	Nathan Beesley	Lymm	22
4	Rhodri Campbell	Sheffield	18
4	Harry Holden	Preston Grasshoppers	18
4	William Roberts	Tynedale	18
5	Ryan Burrows	Sheffield	17
6	Patrick Jennings	Lymm	16
6	Lewis Minikin	Hull Ionians	16
6	Samuel Wadsworth	Lymm	16

== See also ==
- 2024–25 National League 1
- 2024–25 National League 2 East
- 2024–25 National League 2 West
