= 2025–26 Champ Rugby =

Rugby union competition in England

- Countries: England
- Date: 3 October 2025 – 31 May 2026
- Champions: Worcester Warriors (4th title)
- Runners-up: Bedford Blues
- Relegated: Cambridge, London Scottish
- Matches played: 187
- Attendance: 383,873 (average 2,053 per match)
- Highest attendance: 9,000 (2) – Worcester v Coventry, 4 October 2025; Worcester v Chinnor 27 October 2025
- Lowest attendance: 357 – L Scottish v Ampthill, 11 April 2026
- Tries scored: 1581 (average 8.5 per match)
- Top point scorer: 248 – Harry Bazalgette (Hartpury)
- Top try scorer: 23 – Dean Adamson (Bedford)

The 2025–26 Champ Rugby was the seventeenth season of the Champ Rugby, the professional second tier of rugby union in England. It was the first season under the rebranded banner of Champ Rugby, succeeding sixteen seasons under RFU Championship branding. The number of teams in the league increased by two, as there was no relegation in the previous season. Ealing Trailfinders are the defending champions. Ealing were not promoted to the Premiership after failing to meet the minimum standards criteria. Richmond were promoted from National League 1 and newly-reestablished Worcester Warriors were added following the old club's period of administration.

Ealing Trailfinders finished top of the table at the end of the league stage. Once again they were easily the best side in the division, winning all 26 league games, and qualifying in first place 30 points clear of second placed Bedford Blues, with both sides gaining a home spot in the Champ play-off semi-finals. The other qualifiers were Coventry, Worcester Warriors, Chinnor and Hartpury who would contest the quarter-finals. Fourth placed Worcester Warriors finished as champions, defeating second placed Bedford Blues in the final, to claim their fourth tier 2 title and tie with Bristol Bears for most championships at this level. Despite victory Worcester were not allowed a chance of promotion as the Rugby Football Union decided to end promotion or relegation for the foreseeable future - a decision made part way through the season.

Cambridge finished bottom of the table and were automatically relegated, following a 7 – 31 home defeat on 11 April to league leaders Ealing Trailfinders, condemning them to the drop with three games still to play, and ending a three year stay at tier 1. They were joined by London Scottish who lost both relegation play-off games, first to Richmond and then to the 2025–26 National League 1 runners up, Blackheath on 23 May 2026, ending 15 seasons at tier 2.

== Background ==
On 15 May 2025, the Rugby Football Union (RFU) unveiled the new format and structure of English rugby's second division branded Champ Rugby. The competition will see a return of relegation to National League 1 and potential promotion to the Premiership, which Tier 2 board chair Simon Gillham said will create "aspiration and jeopardy".

The league has been expanded to 14 teams, with 2024–25 National League 1 winners Richmond joining the competition alongside newly reestablished Worcester Warriors, who will mark their return to professional rugby following a period in administration and liquidation of the old club.

== Structure ==
=== League season ===
The fourteen teams will play each of the other teams twice, once at home and once away from home.

The results of the matches contribute points to the league as follows:

- 4 points are awarded for a win
- 2 points are awarded for a draw
- 0 points are awarded for a loss, however
  - 1 losing (bonus) point is awarded to a team that loses a match by 7 points or fewer
  - 1 additional (bonus) point is awarded to a team scoring 4 tries or more in a match

=== Play-offs and relegation ===
1st–6th place
The top six sides, after the regular season, will enter into a play-off phase to determine the league champions. The teams that finish in first and second place in the regular season standings will earn automatic home semi-final places. The 3rd–6th placed teams in the league standings will play quarter-finals to determine who makes it to the semi-finals. The eventual champions will then face the bottom placed team in the 2025–26 Premiership for a chance at promotion to the top tier.

12th & 13th
The teams placed 12th and 13th in the table will face each other in single-leg play-off, the loser playing the runner-up in 2025–26 National League 1. The eventual winner will be in Champ Rugby for the 2026–27 season.

14th
The bottom placed side will be automatically relegated to National League 1 for the 2026–27 season. They will be replaced by the National League 1 champions.

== Participation teams and location ==
Fourteen teams will complete in the league – the twelve teams from last season, the champions of National League One and Worcester Warriors. No team was promoted to the Premiership. Last season the RFU's Tier 2 Board ran a tender process for any club, college or university to join this league, if they could meet a growth strategy and minimum operating standards. On 3 April 2025 the RFU announced that Worcester Warriors will return to professional rugby, two and half years after going into administration.

Club	Stadium	Capacity	Area	Previous season
Ampthill	Dillingham Park	3,000	Ampthill, Bedfordshire	8th
Bedford Blues	Goldington Road	5,531 (1,700 seats) (Note: Goldington Road capacity up from 5,000 to 5,531 for the 2025–26 season with capacity crowd achieved versus Richmond on 26 December 2025.)	Bedford, Bedfordshire	2nd
Caldy	Paton Field	4,000	Thurstaston, Wirral, Merseyside	11th
Cambridge	Grantchester Road	2,200 (200 seats)	Cambridge, Cambridgeshire	12th (not relegated)
Chinnor	Kingsey Road	3,000 (560 seats) (Note: Chinnor upgraded their temporary 350 seater stand to a permanent grandstand containing 560 seats ahead of the 2025–26 season. Ground capacity was also adjusted to 3,000.)	Thame, Oxfordshire	10th
Cornish Pirates	Mennaye Field (Note: Due to storm damage to the Mennaye Field in January 2026, Cornish Pirates would play two home games at the 7,000 capacity Recreation Ground, home of Camborne RFC.)	4,000 (2,200 seats)	Penzance, Cornwall	4th
Coventry	Butts Park Arena	5,250 (3,000 seats)	Coventry, West Midlands	5th
Doncaster Knights	Castle Park	5,183 (1,926 seats)	Doncaster, South Yorkshire	3rd
Ealing Trailfinders	Trailfinders Sports Ground	5,000 (2,115 seats)	West Ealing, London	Champions (not promoted)
Hartpury University	Hartpury Stadium	2,000	Hartpury, Gloucestershire	6th
London Scottish	Athletic Ground	4,500 (1,000 seats)	Richmond, London	9th
Nottingham	Lady Bay Sports Ground	3,700	Nottingham, Nottinghamshire	7th
Richmond	Athletic Ground	4,500 (1,000 seats)	Richmond, London	Promoted from National 1 (champions)
Worcester Warriors	Sixways Stadium	9,800	Worcester	First season

Locations of the 2025–26 Champ Rugby teams
2025–26 Greater London Championship clubs

== Table ==
2025–26 Champ Rugby table
Pos	Team	Pld	W	D	L	PF	PA	PD	TB	LB	Pts	Qualification
1	Ealing Trailfinders	26	26	0	0	1125	437	+688	23	0	127	Play-off semi-finals
2	Bedford Blues	26	18	1	7	802	643	+159	20	3	97	Play-off semi-finals
3	Coventry	26	16	0	10	1053	723	+330	22	7	93	Play-off quarter-finals
4	Worcester Warriors	26	15	0	11	899	652	+247	21	6	87	Play-off quarter-finals
5	Chinnor	26	16	0	10	697	635	+62	12	6	82	Play-off quarter-finals
6	Hartpury	26	15	2	9	772	632	+140	14	3	81	Play-off quarter-finals
7	Cornish Pirates	26	13	1	12	770	671	+99	16	3	73	
8	Doncaster Knights	26	12	3	11	729	655	+74	15	4	73	
9	Nottingham	26	12	1	13	639	647	−8	14	8	72	
10	Ampthill	26	12	0	14	828	890	−62	18	5	71	
11	Caldy	26	9	0	17	574	814	−240	11	5	52	
12	Richmond	26	7	1	18	525	823	−298	7	4	41	Relegation play-off
13	London Scottish (R)	26	6	0	20	475	923	−448	8	3	35	Relegation play-off
14	Cambridge (R)	26	0	1	25	447	1190	−743	7	4	13	Relegated

Updated to match(es) played on 9 May 2026. Source: England Rugby
Rules for classification: If teams are level at any stage, tiebreakers are applied in the following order:
1. Number of matches won
2. Number of matches drawn
3. Difference between points for and against
4. Total number of points for
5. Aggregate number of points scored in matches between tied teams
6. Number of matches won excluding the first match, then the second and so on until the tie is settled

== Regular season ==
The regular season fixtures were announced on 10 July 2025.

=== Round 1 ===
3 October 2025
19:45

(1 BP) Nottingham	26–8	Doncaster Knights

Lady Bay Sports Ground
Attendance: 1,301
Referee: Alex Thomas

4 October 2025
14:00

(1 BP) Worcester Warriors	29–19	Coventry

Sixways Stadium
Attendance: 9,000 (Note: The Rugby Paper gave an attendance of 12,067 for Worcester v Coventry on 4 October 2025 while the RFU match card gave 9,000. The RFU figure has been used.)
Referee: Hamish Grant

4 October 2025
14:30

(1 BP) Cornish Pirates	21–22	Hartpury

Mennaye Field
Attendance: 1,381
Referee: Jamie Parr

4 October 2025
15:00

Richmond	18–13	Chinnor (1 BP)

Athletic Ground
Attendance: 1,007 (Note: The Rugby Paper gave an attendance figure of 1,100 for Richmond v Chinnor on 4 October 2025 while the RFU match gard gave 1,007. The RFU figure has been used.)
Referee: Charles Gayther

4 October 2025
15:00

(1 BP) Cambridge	24–45	Ampthill (1 BP)

Grantchester Road
Attendance: 1,065
Referee: Andrew Wigley

4 October 2025
15:00

(1 BP) Caldy	26–10	London Scottish

Paton Field
Attendance: 1,320
Referee: Henry Pearson

4 October 2025
16:00

(1 BP) Bedford Blues	22–50	Ealing Trailfinders (1 BP)

Goldington Road
Attendance: 2,413
Referee: Luke Pearce

=== Round 2 ===
10 October 2025
19:45

London Scottish	7–26	Nottingham (1 BP)

Athletic Ground
Attendance: 819
Referee: Jonathan Cook

11 October 2025
14:30

(1 BP) Doncaster Knights	42–15	Cambridge

Castle Park
Attendance: 1,334
Referee: Charles Gayther

11 October 2025
14:30

Hartpury	28–25	Worcester Warriors (2 BP)

Hartpury Stadium
Attendance: 2,000
Referee: Andrew Wigley

11 October 2025
15:00

(1 BP) Ampthill	26–21	Cornish Pirates (1 BP)

Dillingham Park
Attendance: 1,072
Referee: Richard Gordon

11 October 2025
15:00

(1 BP) Caldy	27–21	Richmond (1 BP)

Paton Field
Attendance: 1,834
Referee: Jamie Parr

11 October 2025
15:00

(1 BP) Coventry	35–30	Bedford Blues (2 BP)

Butts Park Arena
Attendance: 2,764
Referee: Ian Tempest

11 October 2025
15:00

(1 BP) Ealing Trailfinders	55–7	Chinnor

Trailfinders Sports Ground
Attendance: 1,293
Referee: Ben Wood

=== Round 3 ===
17 October 2025
19:45

(2 BP) Nottingham	24–31	Caldy (1 BP)

Lady Bay Sports Ground
Attendance: 1,484
Referee: Harry Walbaum

17 October 2025
19:45

Richmond	12–43	Ealing Trailfinders (1 BP)

Athletic Ground
Attendance: 1,205 (Note: The Rugby Paper gave a crowd figure of 1,400 for Richmond v Ealing on 17 October 2025 while the RFU had 1,205 on the match card. The RFU figure has been used.)
Referee: Mike Lamb

17 October 2025
19:45

(1 BP) Worcester Warriors	56–28	Ampthill (1 BP)

Sixways Stadium
Attendance: 8,000 (Note: The Rugby Paper had a crowd figure of 7,250 for the Worcester v Ampthill game on 17 October 2025 while the RFU match report had 8,000. The RFU figure has been used.)
Referee: Ben Wood

18 October 2025
14:30

Cornish Pirates	15–15	Doncaster Knights

Mennaye Field
Attendance: 1,626 (Note: The Rugby Paper had a crowd figure of 1,627 for Cornish Pirates v Doncaster on 18 October 2025 while the RFU match card had 1,626. The RFU figure has been used.)
Referee: Joe James

18 October 2025
15:00

(1 BP) Bedford Blues	38–30	Hartpury

Goldington Road
Attendance: 2,575
Referee: Daniel Jones

18 October 2025
15:00

Cambridge	15–38	London Scottish (1 BP)

Grantchester Road
Attendance: 1,284
Referee: Alex Thomas

18 October 2025
15:00

(1 BP) Chinnor	47–26	Coventry (1 BP)

Kingsey Road
Attendance: 2,104
Referee: Henry Pearson

=== Round 4 ===
24 October 2025
19:45

(1BP) Nottingham	29–27	Richmond (1BP)

Lady Bay Sports Ground
Attendance: 1,154 (Note: The Rugby Paper gave an attendance figure of 1,167 for Nottingham v Richmond on 24 October 2025 while the RFU match card had 1,154. The RFU figure has been used.)
Referee: Jonathan Cook

25 October 2025
14:30

Doncaster Knights	34–31	Worcester Warriors (2 BP)

Castle Park
Attendance: 2,087
Referee: Hamish Smales

25 October 2025
14:30

(1 BP) Hartpury	25–19	Chinnor (1 BP)

Hartpury Stadium
Attendance: 870
Referee: Hamish Grant

25 October 2025
15:00

Ampthill	12–66	Bedford Blues (1 BP)

Dillingham Park
Attendance: 1,975
Referee: Jamie Parr

25 October 2025
15:00

(1 BP) Caldy	41–24	Cambridge (1 BP)

Paton Field
Attendance: 1,876
Referee: Richard Gordon

25 October 2025
15:00

(1 BP) Coventry	36–63	Ealing Trailfinders (1 BP)

Butts Park Arena
Attendance: 2,631
Referee: Joe James

25 October 2025
15:00

London Scottish	10–38	Cornish Pirates (1 BP)

Athletic Ground
Attendance: 906
Referee: Charles Gayther

=== Round 5 ===
31 October 2025
19:45

(1 BP) Bedford Blues	36–32	Doncaster Knights (2 BP)

Goldington Road
Attendance: 2,196
Referee: Craig Maxwell-Keys

31 October 2025
19:45

(1 BP) Worcester Warriors	52–19	London Scottish

Sixways Stadium
Attendance: 8,900 (Note: The Rugby Paper had an attendance of 7,500 for Worcester v London Scottish on 31 October 2025 while the RFU match card had 8,900. The RFU figure has been used.)
Referee: Hamish Grant

1 November 2025
14:00

(2 BP) Cambridge	32–36	Nottingham (1 BP)

Grantchester Road
Attendance: 1,267
Referee: Charles Gayther

1 November 2025
14:00

Richmond	17–52	Coventry (1 BP)

Athletic Ground
Attendance: 700 (Note: The Rugby Paper gave an attendance of 750 for Richmond v Coventry while the RFU match card gave 700. The RFU figure has been used.)
Referee: Andrew Wigley

1 November 2025
14:30

(1 BP) Cornish Pirates	34–27	Caldy (2 BP)

Mennaye Field
Attendance: 1,506 (Note: The Rugby Paper gave an attendance of 1,504 for Cornish Pirates v Caldy on 1 November 2025 while the RFU match card had 1,506. The RFU figure has been used.)
Referee: Henry Pearson

1 November 2025
15:00

Chinnor	17–10	Ampthill (1 BP)

Kingsey Road
Attendance: 1,207 (Note: Attendance for Chinnor v Ampthill given as 1,300 by The Rugby Paper but 1,207 on RFU Match card. RFU figure will be used.)
Referee: Daniel Rowlands

1 November 2025
15:00

(1 BP) Ealing Trailfinders	27–19	Hartpury

Trailfinders Sports Ground
Attendance: 1,263
Referee: Jamie Parr

=== Round 6 ===
7 November 2025
19:30

(1 BP) Doncaster Knights	21–23	Chinnor

Castle Park
Attendance: 1,290
Referee: Charles Gayther

7 November 2025
19:45

London Scottish	7–26	Bedford Blues (1 BP)

Athletic Ground
Attendance: 962
Referee: Jamie Parr

7 November 2025
19:45

(1 BP) Nottingham	28–36	Cornish Pirates (1 BP)

Lady Bay Sports Ground
Attendance: 1,614
Referee: Andrew Wigley

8 November 2025
14:00

Ampthill	0–71	Ealing Trailfinders (1 BP)

Dillingham Park
Attendance: 693
Referee: Ben Wood

8 November 2025
14:00

(1 BP) Caldy	15–17	Worcester Warriors

Paton Field
Attendance: 1,876
Referee: Jonathan Cook

8 November 2025
14:00

Cambridge	5–54	Richmond (1 BP)

Grantchester Road
Attendance: 1,176
Referee: Harry Walbaum

8 November 2025
14:30

(1 BP) Hartpury	36–31	Coventry (2 BP)

Hartpury Stadium
Attendance: 1,020 (Note: The Rugby Paper gave 650 as the attendance for Hartpury v Coventry on 8 November 2025 while the RFU had 1,020 on the match card. The RFU figure will be used.)
Referee: Craig Maxwell Keys

=== Round 7 ===
14 November 2025
19:45

Bedford Blues	20–8	Caldy

Goldington Road
Attendance: 2,107
Referee: Charles Gayther

14 November 2025
19:45

Chinnor	22–20	London Scottish (1 BP)

Kingsey Road
Attendance: 1,628
Referee: Jonathan Cook

14 November 2025
19:45

Richmond	17–12	Hartpury (1 BP)

Athletic Ground
Attendance: 755 (Note: The Rugby Paper gave a crowd figure of 750 for Richmond v Hartpury while the RFU match card was 755. The RFU figure has been used.)
Referee: Richard Gordon

15 November 2025
13:00

(1 BP) Cornish Pirates	52–0	Cambridge

Mennaye Field
Attendance: 1,582
Referee: Matthew Sharpe

15 November 2025
13:00

(1 BP) Coventry	68–26	Ampthill (1 BP)

Butts Park Arena
Attendance: 2,415
Referee: Henry Pearson

15 November 2025
17:00

(1 BP) Worcester Warriors	24–22	Nottingham (1 BP)

Sixways Stadium
Attendance: 6,500 (Note: The Rugby Paper gave 6,900 as the attendance for Worcester v Nottingham on 15 November 2025 while the RFU match card gave 6,500. The RFU figure has been used.)
Referee: Sara Cox

16 November 2025
15:00

(1 BP) Ealing Trailfinders	35–21	Doncaster Knights

Trailfinders Sports Ground
Attendance: 1,595 (Note: Ealing v Doncaster attendance figure on 16 November 2025 provided by RFU match card.)
Referee: Joe James

=== Round 8 ===
28 November 2025
19:45

(1 BP) Nottingham	28–28	Bedford Blues (1 BP)

Lady Bay Sports Ground
Attendance: 1,551
Referee: Ben Wood

29 November 2025
13:30

Ampthill	21–31	Hartpury (1 BP)

Dillingham Park
Attendance: 672
Referee: Andrew Wigley

29 November 2025
14:00

(1 BP) Caldy	28–36	Chinnor (1 BP)

Paton Field
Attendance: 1,276
Referee: Henry Pearson

29 November 2025
14:00

Cambridge	14–61	Worcester Warriors (1 BP)

Grantchester Road
Attendance: 1,329
Referee: Michael Lamb

29 November 2025
14:30

(1 BP) Cornish Pirates	28–19	Richmond

Mennaye Field
Attendance: 1,722
Referee: Ben Simpson

29 November 2025
14:30

Doncaster Knights	24–21	Coventry (1 BP)

Castle Park
Attendance: 1,669
Referee: Jonathan Cook

29 November 2025
15:00

London Scottish	14–38	Ealing Trailfinders (1 BP)

Athletic Ground
Attendance: 793
Referee: Charles Gayther

=== Round 9 ===
5 December 2025
19:45

(1 BP) Chinnor	6–11	Nottingham

Kingsey Road
Attendance: 900
Referee: Hamish Grant

6 December 2025
14:30

Hartpury	33–33	Doncaster Knights (1 BP)

Hartpury Stadium
Attendance: 802
Referee: Charles Gayther (Note: The Rugby Paper had Alex Thomas as the referee for Hartpury v Doncaster on 6 December 2025 (despite also referring Coventry v London Scottish on the same day) while the RFU match card had Charles Gayther. The RFU referee will be used.)

6 December 2025
15:00

(1 BP) Bedford Blues	29–28	Cambridge (2 BP)

Goldington Road
Attendance: 2,595
Referee: Jonathan Cook

6 December 2025
15:00

(1 BP) Coventry	61–10	London Scottish

Butts Park Arena
Attendance: 2,856
Referee: Alex Thomas

6 December 2025
15:00

(1 BP) Ealing Trailfinders	38–0	Caldy

Trailfinders Sports Ground
Attendance: 1,200
Referee: Jamie Parr

6 December 2025
15:00

(1 BP) Richmond	20–25	Ampthill

Athletic Ground
Attendance: 860
Referee: Craig Maxwell-Keys

6 December 2025
15:00

(1 BP) Worcester Warriors	40–24	Cornish Pirates (1 BP)

Sixways Stadium
Attendance: 6,800
Referee: Ben Wood

=== Round 10 ===
12 December 2025
19:30

(2 BP) Cornish Pirates	26–27	Bedford Blues (1 BP)

Mennaye Field
Attendance: 1,601
Referee: Harry Walbaum

12 December 2025
19:45

(1 BP) Nottingham	14–17	Ealing Trailfinders

Lady Bay Sports Ground
Attendance: 1,231
Referee: Henry Pearson

13 December 2025
14:00

Caldy	22–33	Coventry (1 BP)

Paton Field
Attendance: 892
Referee: Craig Maxwell-Keys

13 December 2025
14:00

Cambridge	15–55	Chinnor (1 BP)

Grantchester Road
Attendance: 1,136
Referee: George Selwood

13 December 2025
14:00

(1 BP) Worcester Warriors	31–19	Richmond

Sixways Stadium
Attendance: 6,200
Referee: Charles Gayther

13 December 2025
14:30

(1 BP) Doncaster Knights	30–38	Ampthill (1 BP)

Castle Park
Attendance: 1,417
Referee: Ben Wood

13 December 2025
15:00

(1 BP) London Scottish	24–33	Hartpury (1 BP)

Athletic Ground
Attendance: 682
Referee: Jonathan Cook

=== Round 11 ===
19 December 2025
19:45

Richmond	7–31	Doncaster Knights (1 BP)

Athletic Ground
Attendance: 962
Referee: Jamie Parr

20 December 2025
13:30

(1 BP) Ampthill	38–32	London Scottish (2 BP)

Dillingham Park
Attendance: 806
Referee: Hamish Grant

20 December 2025
14:30

(1 BP) Hartpury	38–22	Caldy

Hartpury Stadium
Attendance: 810
Referee: Sara Cox

20 December 2025
15:00

(1 BP) Bedford Blues	35–19	Worcester Warriors

Goldington Road
Attendance: 3,277
Referee: George Selwood

20 December 2025
15:00

(1 BP) Chinnor	47–10	Cornish Pirates

Kingsey Road
Attendance: 2,231
Referee: Joe James

20 December 2025
15:00

(1 BP) Coventry	41–36	Nottingham (2 BP)

Butts Park Arena
Attendance: 3,281
Referee: Benjamin Wood

20 December 2025
15:00

(1 BP) Ealing Trailfinders	68–17	Cambridge

Trailfinders Sports Ground
Attendance: 1,569
Referee: Michael Lamb

=== Round 12 ===
26 December 2025
14:00

Cambridge	19–33	Coventry (1 BP)

Grantchester Road
Attendance: 1,438
Referee: Alexander Thomas

26 December 2025
15:00

(1 BP) Bedford Blues	33–10	Richmond

Goldington Road
Attendance: 5,531
Referee: Hamish Grant

26 December 2025
15:00

(1 BP) Nottingham	38–24	Hartpury (1 BP)

Lady Bay Sports Ground
Attendance: 2,121
Referee: Jack Sutton

27 December 2025
14:00

(1 BP) Caldy	34–29	Ampthill (2 BP)

Paton Field
Attendance: 1,945
Referee: Henry Pearson

27 December 2025
14:30

Cornish Pirates	14–41	Ealing Trailfinders (1 BP)

Mennaye Field
Attendance: 3,100
Referee: Jamie Parr

27 December 2025
15:00

(2 BP) Worcester Warriors	26–27	Chinnor (1 BP)

Sixways Stadium
Attendance: 9,000 (Note: The Rugby Paper gave an attendance of 9,500 for Worcester Warriors v Chinnor on 27 December 2025. The actual figure provided by the RFU was 9,000.)
Referee: Harry Walbaum

27 December 2025
17:00

(1 BP) London Scottish	34–10	Doncaster Knights

Athletic Ground
Attendance: 787
Referee: Morgan White

=== Round 13 ===
1 January 2026
15:00

(1 BP) Coventry	41–26	Cornish Pirates (1 BP)

Butts Park Arena
Attendance: 3,678 (Note: Coventry v Cornish Pirates on 1 January 2026 attendance given as 3,600 by The Rugby Paper but was announced as 3,678 at the ground. The club figure will be used.)
Referee: Hamish Grant

3 January 2026
13:30

(1 BP) Ampthill	36–27	Nottingham (1 BP)

Dillingham Park
Attendance: 804
Referee: Charles Gayther

3 January 2026
14:30

(2 BP) Doncaster Knights	27–28	Caldy (1 BP)

Castle Park
Attendance: 1,567
Referee: George Selwood

3 January 2026
14:30

(1 BP) Hartpury	42–22	Cambridge (1 BP)

Hartpury Stadium
Attendance: 760
Referee: Morgan White

3 January 2026
15:00

Chinnor	P–P	Bedford Blues

Kingsey Road

- Postponed by match on referee grounds of player safety due to recent cold weather. (Note: The Chinnor v Bedford cancellation on 3 January 2026 was a very late call as both teams had agreed to play following a pitch inspection but the referee made the final decision to call off the game due to concerns over player safety.) Game to be rescheduled for 17 January 2026.

3 January 2026
15:00

(1 BP) Ealing Trailfinders	34–33	Worcester Warriors (2 BP)

Trailfinders Sports Ground
Attendance: 3,086
Referee: Adam Leal

3 January 2026
15:00

(2 BP) Richmond	26–27	London Scottish

Athletic Ground
Attendance: 1,950
Referee: Harry Walbaum

=== Round 13 (rescheduled) ===
17 January 2026
15:00

Chinnor	27–17	Bedford Blues

Kingsey Road
Attendance: 1,922
Referee: Jamie Parr

- Game rescheduled from 3 January 2026.

=== Round 14 ===
23 January 2026
19:45

(1 BP) Chinnor	15–21	Ealing Trailfinders

Kingsey Road
Attendance: 2,435
Referee: Andrew Jackson

23 January 2026
19:45

(1 BP) Nottingham	27–12	London Scottish

Lady Bay Sports Ground
Attendance: 1,276
Referee: George Selwood

24 January 2026
14:00

Cambridge	12–12	Doncaster Knights

Grantchester Road
Attendance: 1,120
Referee: Dan Rhys Jones

24 January 2026
14:00

(2 BP) Worcester Warriors	28–34	Hartpury (1 BP)

Sixways Stadium
Attendance: 7,000
Referee: Harry Walbaum

24 January 2026
14:30

(1 BP) Cornish Pirates	45–24	Ampthill (1 BP)

Recreation Ground, Camborne (Note: Storm damage to the Mennaye Field in January 2026 meant that Cornish Pirates would have to play their home game on 24 January 2026 versus Ampthill at the Recreation Ground, home of Camborne RFC.)
Attendance: 1,310
Referee: Hamish Grant

24 January 2026
15:00

(1 BP) Bedford Blues	38–31	Coventry (2 BP)

Goldington Road
Attendance: 3,198
Referee: Richard Gordon

24 January 2026
15:00

(1 BP) Richmond	31–12	Caldy

Athletic Ground
Attendance: 1,051
Referee: Alex Thomas

=== Round 15 ===
31 January 2026
13:30

Ampthill	14–41	Worcester Warriors (1 BP)

Dillingham Park
Attendance: 975
Referee: Ben Simpson

31 January 2026
14:00

Caldy	21–19	Nottingham (1 BP)

Paton Field
Attendance: 1,347
Referee: Andrew Jackson

31 January 2026
14:30

Hartpury	18–13	Bedford Blues (1 BP)

Hartpury Stadium
Attendance: 670
Referee: Daniel Jones

31 January 2026
14:30

(1 BP) Doncaster Knights	44–12	Cornish Pirates

Castle Park
Attendance: 1,819
Referee: Ian Tempest

31 January 2026
15:00

(1 BP) Coventry	14–19	Chinnor

Butts Park Arena
Attendance: 2,755
Referee: Benjamin Wood

31 January 2026
15:00

(1 BP) Ealing Trailfinders	65–7	Richmond

Trailfinders Sports Ground
Attendance: 2,088
Referee: Damian Schneider

31 January 2026
15:00

(1 BP) London Scottish	27–10	Cambridge

Athletic Ground
Attendance: 698
Referee: Jonathan Cook

=== Round 16 ===
6 February 2026
19:45

(1 BP) Bedford Blues	35–13	Ampthill

Goldington Road
Attendance: 3,413
Referee: Jonathan Cook

6 February 2026
19:45

Richmond	17–15	Nottingham (1 BP)

Athletic Ground
Attendance: 748
Referee: Iain Kiy

7 February 2026
14:00

(2 BP) Cambridge	24–26	Caldy (1 BP)

Grantchester Road
Attendance: 773
Referee: Hamish Grant

7 February 2026
14:30

Chinnor	21–39	Hartpury (1 BP)

Kingsey Road
Attendance: 1,560
Referee: Harry Walbaum

7 February 2026
14:30

Worcester Warriors	25–20	Doncaster Knights (1 BP)

Sixways Stadium
Attendance: 7,000
Referee: Craig Maxwell-Keys

7 February 2026
15:00

(1 BP) Ealing Trailfinders	36–34	Coventry (2 BP)

Trailfinders Sports Ground
Attendance: 1,450
Referee: Richard Gordon

8 February 2026
14:00

(1 BP) Cornish Pirates	43–12	London Scottish

Recreation Ground, Camborne (Note: Storm damage to the Mennaye Field in January 2026 meant that Cornish Pirates would have to play their home game on 8 February 2026 versus London Scottish at the Recreation Ground, home of Camborne RFC.)
Attendance: 1,176
Referee: Daniel Jones

=== Round 17 ===
13 February 2026
19:45

London Scottish	7–66	Worcester Warriors (1 BP)

Athletic Ground
Attendance: 924
Referee: Ben Wood

13 February 2026
19:45

Nottingham	21–17	Cambridge (1 BP)

Lady Bay Sports Ground
Attendance: 1,188
Referee: Andrew Jackson

13 February 2026
20:00

(1 BP) Coventry	48–21	Richmond

Butts Park Arena
Attendance: 2,087
Referee: Joe James

14 February 2026
14:00

(2 BP) Ampthill	29–30	Chinnor (1 BP)

Dillingham Park
Attendance: 545
Referee: Charles Gayther

14 February 2026
14:00

Caldy	21–41	Cornish Pirates (1 BP)

Paton Field
Attendance: 1,219
Referee: Jonathan Cook

14 February 2026
14:30

(1 BP) Doncaster Knights	50–12	Bedford Blues

Castle Park
Attendance: 1,539
Referee: Anthony Woodthorpe

14 February 2026
14:30

Hartpury	19–46	Ealing Trailfinders (1 BP)

Hartpury Stadium
Attendance: 820
Referee: George Selwood

=== Round 18 ===
20 February 2026
19:45

(1 BP) Bedford Blues	54–26	London Scottish (1 BP)

Goldington Road
Attendance: 2,558
Referee: Alex Thomas

20 February 2026
19:45

Chinnor	19–36	Doncaster Knights (1 BP)

Kingsey Road
Attendance: 1,535
Referee: Richard Gordon

20 February 2026
19:45

(1 BP) Richmond	38–22	Cambridge

Athletic Ground
Attendance: 746
Referee: Craig Maxwell-Keys

21 February 2026
12:00

Cornish Pirates	17–12	Nottingham (1 BP)

Mennaye Field
Attendance: 1,215
Referee: Charles Gayther

21 February 2026
12:00

(1 BP) Worcester Warriors	50–33	Caldy (1 BP)

Sixways Stadium
Attendance: 5,600
Referee: Sara Cox

21 February 2026
15:00

(1 BP) Ealing Trailfinders	50–12	Ampthill

Trailfinders Sports Ground
Attendance: 650
Referee: Jamie Parr

21 February 2026
15:00

(1 BP) Coventry	31–19	Hartpury

Butts Park Arena
Attendance: 2,229
Referee: Jonathan Cook

=== Round 19 ===
27 February 2026
19:45

Hartpury	7–7	Richmond

Hartpury Stadium
Attendance: 457
Referee: Christophe Ridley

27 February 2026
19:45

Nottingham	22–7	Worcester Warriors

Lady Bay Sports Ground
Attendance: 1,893
Referee: Ian Tempest

28 February 2026
14:00

(2 BP) Ampthill	36–40	Coventry (1 BP)

Dillingham Park
Attendance: 1,073
Referee: Hamish Grant

28 February 2026
14:00

(1 BP) Caldy	19–23	Bedford Blues (1 BP)

Paton Field
Attendance: 1,345
Referee: Harry Walbaum

28 February 2026
14:00

Cambridge	21–49	Cornish Pirates (1 BP)

Grantchester Road
Attendance: 1,297
Referee: Ben Simpson

28 February 2026
14:30

Doncaster Knights	7–29	Ealing Trailfinders (1 BP)

Castle Park
Attendance: 1,817
Referee: Richard Gordon

28 February 2026
15:00

(1 BP) London Scottish	24–21	Chinnor (1 BP)

Athletic Ground
Attendance: 826
Referee: Craig Maxwell-Keys

=== Round 20 ===
20 March 2026
19:45

(2 BP) Hartpury	27–32	Ampthill (1 BP)

Hartpury Stadium
Attendance: 1,020
Referee: Hamish Grant

21 March 2026
15:00

(1 BP) Bedford Blues	10–14	Nottingham

Goldington Road
Attendance: 2,977
Referee: Joe James

21 March 2026
15:00

(1 BP) Chinnor	48–36	Caldy (1 BP)

Kingsey Road
Attendance: 1,058
Referee: Richard Gordon

21 March 2026
15:00

(1 BP) Coventry	44–24	Doncaster Knights (1 BP)

Butts Park Arena
Attendance: 3,135
Referee: Charles Gayther

21 March 2026
15:00

(1 BP) Ealing Trailfinders	72–19	London Scottish

Trailfinders Sports Ground
Attendance: 1,100
Referee: Jamie Parr

21 March 2026
15:00

Richmond	13–66	Cornish Pirates (1 BP)

Athletic Ground
Attendance: 1,275
Referee: Ben Wood

21 March 2026
15:00

(1 BP) Worcester Warriors	76–10	Cambridge

Sixways Stadium
Attendance: 6,399
Referee: Andrew Wigley

=== Round 21 ===
27 March 2026
19:30

(1 BP) Doncaster Knights	35–22	Hartpury

Castle Park
Attendance: 1,168
Referee: Harry Walbaum

28 March 2026
14:00

(1 BP) Ampthill	62–14	Richmond

Dillingham Park
Attendance: 1,014
Referee: Joe James

28 March 2026
14:00

Cambridge	21–50	Bedford Blues (1 BP)

Grantchester Road
Attendance: 1,376
Referee: Matthew Sharpe

28 March 2026
14:30

Cornish Pirates	7–29	Worcester Warriors (1 BP)

Mennaye Field
Attendance: 3,096
Referee: Jamie Parr

28 March 2026
15:00

(1 BP) Caldy	19–21	Ealing Trailfinders

Paton Field
Attendance: 1,874
Referee: Daniel Jones

28 March 2026
15:00

(1 BP) London Scottish	29–54	Coventry (1 BP)

Athletic Ground
Attendance: 946
Referee: Henry Pearson

29 March 2026
15:00

(1 BP) Nottingham	19–26	Chinnor (1 BP)

Lady Bay Sports Ground
Attendance: 1,455 (Note: The Rugby Paper failed to give an attendance for Nottingham v Chinnor on 29 March 2026. The figure used has been provided by the RFU from official records.)
Referee: Ben Wood

=== Round 22 ===
3 April 2026
17:00

(1 BP) Chinnor	42–12	Cambridge

Kingsey Road
Attendance: 1,702
Referee: Hamish Grant

4 April 2026
14:30

(1 BP) Hartpury	45–7	London Scottish

Hartpury Stadium
Attendance: 720
Referee: Charles Gayther

4 April 2026
15:00

(1 BP) Ampthill	61–17	Doncaster Knights

Dillingham Park
Attendance: 1,046
Referee: Alexander Thomas

4 April 2026
15:00

(1 BP) Bedford Blues	36–12	Cornish Pirates

Goldington Road
Attendance: 3,295
Referee: Henry Pearson

4 April 2026
15:00

(1 BP) Coventry	69–12	Caldy

Butts Park Arena
Attendance: 2,483
Referee: Richard Gordon

4 April 2026
15:00

(1 BP) Ealing Trailfinders	47–21	Nottingham

Trailfinders Sports Ground
Attendance: 1,438
Referee: Jamie Parr

4 April 2026
15:00

(1 BP) Richmond	29–41	Worcester Warriors (1 BP)

Athletic Ground
Attendance: 1,343
Referee: Harry Walbaum

=== Round 23 ===
10 April 2026
19:30

(1 BP) Doncaster Knights	31–10	Richmond

Castle Park
Attendance: 1,200
Referee: Jamie Parr

10 April 2026
19:45

(1 BP) Nottingham	33–26	Coventry (2 BP)

Lady Bay Sports Ground
Attendance: 2,157
Referee: George Selwood

11 April 2026
14:30

(1 BP) Cornish Pirates	57–21	Chinnor

Mennaye Field
Attendance: 1,687
Referee: Harry Walbaum

11 April 2026
15:00

Caldy	20–17	Hartpury (1 BP)

Paton Field
Attendance: 1,451
Referee: Jonathan Cook

11 April 2026
15:00

Cambridge	7–31	Ealing Trailfinders (1 BP)

Grantchester Road
Attendance: 849
Referee: Michael Lamb

- Cambridge are relegated.

11 April 2026
15:00

London Scottish	19–48	Ampthill (1 BP)

Athletic Ground
Attendance: 357
Referee: Richard Gordon

11 April 2026
15:00

Worcester Warriors	14–28	Bedford Blues (1 BP)

Sixways Stadium
Attendance: 7,000
Referee: Craig Maxwell-Keys

=== Round 24 ===
17 April 2026
20:00

(1 BP) Coventry	77–14	Cambridge

Butts Park Arena
Attendance: 2,138
Referee: Charles Gayther

18 April 2026
14:30

(1 BP) Doncaster Knights	34–5	London Scottish

Castle Park
Attendance: 1,100
Referee: Matthew Sharpe

18 April 2026
14:30

(1 BP) Hartpury	52–19	Nottingham

Hartpury Stadium
Attendance: 1,200
Referee: Henry Pearson

18 April 2026
15:00

(1 BP) Ampthill	64–15	Caldy

Dillingham Park
Attendance: 1,036
Referee: Harry Walbaum

18 April 2026
15:00

(1 BP) Chinnor	32–22	Worcester Warriors (1 BP)

Kingsey Road
Attendance: 2,588
Referee: Alexander Thomas

18 April 2026
15:00

(1 BP) Ealing Trailfinders	41–26	Cornish Pirates (1 BP)

Trailfinders Sports Ground
Attendance: 1,680
Referee: Ben Wood

18 April 2026
15:00

(1 BP) Richmond	33–52	Bedford Blues (1 BP)

Athletic Ground
Attendance: 1,425
Referee: Andrew Wigley

=== Round 25 ===
1 May 2026
19:45

(1 BP) Nottingham	27–24	Ampthill (2 BP)

Lady Bay Sports Ground
Attendance: 1,224
Referee: Charles Gayther

2 May 2026
14:30

(1 BP) Cornish Pirates	29–24	Coventry (1 BP)

Mennaye Field
Attendance: 2,058
Referee: Daniel Jones

2 May 2026
15:00

(1 BP) Bedford Blues	30–28	Chinnor (2 BP)

Goldington Road
Attendance: 3,402
Referee: Henry Pearson

2 May 2026
15:00

Caldy	17–37	Doncaster Knights (1 BP)

Paton Field
Attendance: 1,246
Referee: George Selwood

2 May 2026
15:00

Cambridge	14–70	Hartpury (1 BP)

Grantchester Road
Attendance: 1,877
Referee: Richard Gordon

2 May 2026
15:00

(1 BP) London Scottish	17–24	Richmond (1 BP)

Athletic Ground
Attendance: 1,953
Referee: Alexander Thomas

2 May 2026
15:00

(2 BP) Worcester Warriors	28–34	Ealing Trailfinders (1 BP)

Sixways Stadium
Attendance: 8,600
Referee: Joe James

=== Round 26 ===
9 May 2026
15:00

(1 BP) Ampthill	75–33	Cambridge (1 BP)

Dillingham Park
Attendance: 1,527
Referee: Jonathan Cook

9 May 2026
15:00

(1 BP) Chinnor	29–14	Richmond

Kingsey Road
Attendance: 2,152
Referee: George Selwood

9 May 2026
15:00

(1 BP) Coventry	64–28	Worcester Warriors (1 BP)

Butts Park Arena
Attendance: 4,644
Referee: Craig Maxwell-Keys

9 May 2026
15:00

(1 BP) Doncaster Knights	54–45	Nottingham (1 BP)

Castle Park
Attendance: 1,891
Referee: Alexander Thomas

9 May 2026
15:00

(1 BP) Ealing Trailfinders	52–14	Bedford Blues

Trailfinders Sports Ground
Attendance: 1,951
Referee: Jamie Parr

9 May 2026
15:00

(1 BP) Hartpury	30–21	Cornish Pirates

Hartpury Stadium
Attendance: 1,020
Referee: Joe James

9 May 2026
15:00

London Scottish	19–14	Caldy (1 BP)

Athletic Ground
Attendance: 651
Referee: Richard Gordon

== Relegation Play-offs ==
Champ Rugby Relegation Play-off			Champ Rugby Ascession Final
			C1	London Scottish	7
12	Richmond	34	N1	Blackheath	27
13	London Scottish	11

=== Champ Rugby Relegation Play-off ===
Clubs that finished 12th and 13th in Champ Rugby would contest a relegation playoff with the 12th placed team having home advantage. The winner would stay in Champ Rugby while the loser would take part in he Champ Accession Final.

16 May 2026
14:00

Richmond (12)	34–11	(13) London Scottish
Try: Jones 11' c Hocking (2) 20' m, 54' c Altier 57' m Obonna 78' c Con: Grieve (3) 15', 55', 79'; Pen: Grieve 62'		Try: Povey 67' m Pen: Bellamy (2) 17', 43'

Athletic Ground
Attendance: 1,968 (Note: The Rugby Paper gave an attendance of 1,910 for Richmond v London Scottish on 16 May 2026. This was incorrect as the real attendance provided by the RFU was 1,968.)
Referee: Jamie Parr

- Richmond retain Champ Rugby status while London Scottish progress to Champ Accession final.

=== Champ Accession Final ===
The loser of the Champ relegation play-off would play at home against the winner of the National League 1 promotion play-off to make up the final team to take part in the 2026–27 Champ Rugby with loser dropping/staying in the 2026–27 National League 1.

23 May 2026
14:00

London Scottish (CR)	7 – 27	Blackheath (N1)
Try: Law 77' c Con: Bellamy 77'		Try: Hirskyj-Douglas 6' c Harding 13' c Hughes 29' c Con: Morley (3) 7', 13', 29'; Pen: Morley (2) 44', 79'

Athletic Ground
Attendance: 2,115
Referee: Hamish Grant

- Blackheath are promoted while London Scottish are relegated.

== Championship Play-offs ==
=== Bracket ===
Quarter-finals
4	Worcester Warriors	35
5	Chinnor	29
3	Coventry	28
6	Hartpury	25

Semi-finals
1	Ealing Trailfinders	29
4	Worcester Warriors	34
2	Bedford Blues	58
3	Coventry	24

Final
4	Worcester Warriors	27
2	Bedford Blues	14

=== Quarter-finals ===
16 May 2026
16:00

Coventry (3)	28–25	(6) Hartpury
Try: Strong 10' c, 39' m Davidson 74' c Con: Mathews 11'; Thomas 75'; Pen: Thomas (3) 55', 60', 78'		Try: Allsopp (2) 27' c, 78' m Denty 80' c Con: Bazalgette (2) 27', 80'; Pen: Bazalgette (2) 7', 17'

Butts Park Arena
Attendance: 2,061
Referee: Alexander Thomas

16 May 2026
18:00

Worcester Warriors (4)	35–29	(5) Chinnor
Try: Naulago (2) 17' c, 77' c Wallis 34' c Anstee 59' c Bassett 64' c Con: Twelvetrees (4) 18', 35', 60', 65'; Reed 78'		Try: Bourton 25' m Walker 29' c Owen 40' c Thompson 80' c Con: Chamberlain (3) 30', 40', 80'; Pen: Chamberlain 48'

Sixways Stadium
Attendance: 3,500 (Note: The Rugby paper gave Worcester a home attendance of 9,764 versus Chinnor on 16 May 2026 which was inacurrate. The real figure provided by the RFU was 3,500.)
Referee: Richard Gordon

=== Semi-finals ===
22 May 2026
19:45

Bedford Blues (2)	58 – 24	(3) Coventry
Try: Hutler (2) 13' c, 47' c Day 49' c Benson 58' c Maisey 60' c Thame 66' c Adamson 68' c Con: Maisey (7) 14', 48', 50', 59', 61', 67', 69'; Pen: Maisey (3) 8', 42', 52'		Try: Maunder 3' m Reeves (2) 25' c, 56' c Ball 80' m Con: Thomas 26'; Mathews 57'

Goldington Road
Attendance: 3,898
Referee: Harry Walbaum

23 May 2026
16:00

Ealing Trailfinders (1)	29 – 34	(4) Worcester Warriors
Try: Dykes (2) 25' c, 50' c Oliver 35' m Buckley 59' m Jones 78' m Con: Jones (2) 26', 50'		Try: Bokenham 5' c Naulago (2) 12' m, 23' c Reed 67' m Garside 80' c Con: Twelvetrees (2) 5', 23'; Reed 80'; Pen: Reed 75'

Trailfinders Sports Ground
Attendance: 2,065
Referee: George Selwood

=== Final ===
31 May 2026
15:00

Bedford Blues (2)	14–27	Worcester Warriors (4)
Try: Conway 10' c Penalty try 19'; Con: Maisey 11'		Try: Bokenham 8' m Anstee 35' c Reed 40' m Naulago 63' c Con: Twelvetrees (2) 36', 63'; Pen: Twelvetrees 70'

Goldington Road
Attendance: 5,531
Referee: Joe James

== Attendances ==
- Include relegation/championship play-offs but does not include Champ Accession Final.

Club	Home Games	Total	Average	Highest	Lowest	% Capacity
Ampthill	13	13,238	1,018	1,975	545	34%
Bedford Blues (Note: Bedford's attendances include championship play-off semi-final & final.)	15	48,966	3,264	5,531	2,107	59%
Caldy	13	19,501	1,500	1,945	892	38%
Cambridge	13	15,987	1,230	1,877	773	56%
Chinnor	13	23,022	1,771	2,588	900	59%
Cornish Pirates	13	23,060	1,774	3,100	1,176	42%
Coventry (Note: Coventry's attendances includes championship play-off quarter-final.)	14	39,157	2,797	4,644	2,061	53%
Doncaster Knights	13	19,898	1,531	2,087	1,100	30%
Ealing Trailfinders (Note: Ealing's attendances include championship play-off semi-final.)	14	22,428	1,602	3,086	650	32%
Hartpury	13	12,169	936	2,000	457	47%
London Scottish	13	11,304	870	1,953	357	19%
Nottingham	13	19,649	1,511	2,157	1,154	41%
Richmond (Note: Richmond's attendances include relegation play-off.)	14	15,995	1,143	1,968	700	25%
Worcester Warriors (Note: Worcester's attendances includes championship play-off quarter-final.)	14	99,499	7,107	9,000	3,500	56%

== Individual statistics ==
- Include relegation/championship play-offs but does not include Champ Accession Final.

=== Top points scorers ===
As of 31 May 2026

Rank	Player	Club	Points
1	(England) Harry Bazalgette (Note: Harry Bazalgette's total includes 10 points from championship play-offs.)	Hartpury	248
2	(England) Will Maisey (Note: Will Maisey's total includes 30 points from championship play-offs.)	Bedford Blues	224
3	(Wales) Will Reed (Note: Will Reed's total includes 17 points from championship play-offs.)	Worcester Warriors	188
4	(England) Tommy Mathews (Note: Tommy Mathews total includes 4 points from championship play-offs.)	Coventry	182
5	(Wales) Dan Jones (Note: Dan Jones total includes 9 points from championship play-offs.)	Ealing Trailfinders	156
5	(Wales) Gwyn Parks	Nottingham	156
6	(England) Russell Bennett	Doncaster Knights	147
7	(England) Callum Grieve (Note: Callum Grieve's total includes 9 points from relegation play-off.)	Richmond	143
8	(Wales) Josh Thomas (Note: Josh Thomas's total includes 13 points from championship play-offs.)	Coventry	130
9	(England) Kieran Wilkinson	Caldy	126

=== Top try scorers ===
As of 31 May 2026

Rank	Player	Club	Tries
1	(England) Dean Adamson (Note: Dean Adamson's total includes 1 try from championship play-offs.)	Bedford Blues	23
2	(England) James Cherry	Nottingham	21
3	(England) Ollie Hearn	Caldy	17
4	(England) Matthew Gallagher	Caldy	15
4	(England) Sol Moody	Cornish Pirates	15
5	(Ireland) Scott Buckley (Note: Scott Buckley's total includes 1 try from championship play-offs.)	Ealing Trailfinders	14
5	(Scotland) Allan Ferrie	Coventry	14
5	(England) Jake Garside (Note: Jake Garside's total includes 1 try from championship play-offs.)	Worcester Warriors	14
5	(Ireland) Zach Kerr	Doncaster Knights	14
5	(Ireland) Peter Sullivan	Coventry	14

== See also ==
- 2025–26 Premiership Rugby
