= 2024–25 National League 1 =

Rugby union competition in England

- Countries: England
- Date: 7 September 2024 – 26 April 2025
- Champions: Richmond (4th title)
- Runners-up: Rosslyn Park
- Relegated: Darlington Mowden Park, Esher (Note: The expansion of the 2025–26 RFU Championship from 12 to 14 teams meant only 2 teams were relegated instead of 3 meaning that 12th placed Leicester Lions were safe from the drop.)
- Matches played: 182
- Attendance: 126,272 (average 694 per match)
- Highest attendance: 2,410 – Plymouth v Rosslyn Park, 22 March 2025
- Lowest attendance: 140 – Leicester Lions v Richmond, 15 February 2025
- Tries scored: 1472 (average 8.1 per match)
- Top point scorer: 297 – Richard Hayes (Rotherham)
- Top try scorer: 20 – Rhys Henderson (Sedgley Park)

The 2024–25 National League 1 was the 37th season of the third tier of the English domestic rugby union competitions.

Richmond were crowned as champions on 5 April, a win against Rams on the Friday, combined with title challengers Rotherham Titans losing on the Saturday, enough to give them the title with two games still to play and securing promotion to the 2025–26 RFU Championship. It would be Richmond's fourth league title and fifth promotion from tier 3 (both divisional records). Despite the league title fight being very competitive, with five teams looking possible for promotion at one point, in the end it was fairly comfortable for Richmond who finished 11th points clear of runners up Rosslyn Park.

Darlington Mowden Park were the first side to be relegated on 15 March, losing at home to Bishop's Stortford to go down with four games to go in what was a terrible season for Mowden Park both on and off the pitch. The second relegation spot would go down to the final game, with both Leicester Lions five point victory enough to keep them up 4 points clear of 13th placed Esher. Normally Leicester Lions would also have been relegated but the reorganisation of the 2025–26 RFU Championship from 12 to 14 teams meant that the 12th placed National League 1 side would be exempt from relegation. Darlington Mowden Park would drop down to the 2025–26 National League 2 North, ending a stay of eleven consecutive years at tier 3, while newly promoted Esher would make an instant return to the 2025–26 National League 2 East.

== Structure ==
The league consists of fourteen teams, with all the teams playing each other on a home and away basis, to make a total of twenty-six matches each. There is one promotion place, with the champions promoted to the RFU Championship, and typically there are three relegation places to either, National League 2 East, National League 2 North or National League 2 West, depending on the geographical location of the team.

Earlier in the season it had been indicated that the RFU Championship was due to increase from 12 to 14 teams for 2025–26. This was finally confirmed by the RFU with most of the season completed, and the subsequent league restructuring meant that one team per league level would have a reprieve from relegation meaning that only two teams instead of the normal three would be relegated from National League 1 at the end of 2024–25.

== Participating teams and locations ==
2024–25 National 1 teams in England
2024–25 Greater London National League 1 clubs

Team	Ground	Capacity	City/Area	Previous season
Birmingham Moseley	Billesley Common	5,000 (1,300 seats)	Birmingham, West Midlands	5th
Bishop's Stortford	Silver Leys	1,600	Bishop's Stortford, Hertfordshire	11th
Blackheath	Well Hall	1,650 (550 seats)	Eltham, London	8th
Darlington Mowden Park	The Darlington Arena	25,500	Darlington, County Durham	7th
Dings Crusaders	Shaftesbury Park	2,250 (250 seats)	Frenchay, Bristol	Promoted from National League 2 West (champions)
Esher	Molesey Road	3,500	Hersham, Surrey	Promoted from National League 2 East (champions)
Leicester Lions	Westleigh Park	2,000	Blaby, Leicestershire	12th
Plymouth Albion	The Brickfields	8,500	Plymouth, Devon	4th
Rams	Old Bath Road	2,000 (300 seats)	Sonning, Reading, Berkshire	2nd
Richmond	Athletic Ground	4,500 (1,000 seats)	Richmond, London	6th
Rosslyn Park	The Rock	2,000 (630 seats)	Roehampton, London	3rd
Rotherham Titans	Clifton Lane	2,500	Rotherham, South Yorkshire	Promoted from National League 2 North (champions)
Sale FC	Heywood Road	3,387	Sale, Greater Manchester	10th
Sedgley Park	Park Lane	3,000	Whitefield, Bury, Greater Manchester	9th

== League table ==
2024–25 National League 1 table
Pos	Team	Pld	W	D	L	PF	PA	PD	TB	LB	Pts	Qualification
1	Richmond (C)	26	21	2	3	888	525	+363	19	1	108	Promotion place
2	Rosslyn Park	26	19	0	7	906	675	+231	19	2	97	
3	Rotherham Titans	26	19	0	7	803	636	+167	14	4	94	
4	Plymouth Albion	26	17	0	9	750	648	+102	17	6	91	
5	Rams	26	16	0	10	784	588	+196	20	6	90	
6	Blackheath	26	16	0	10	818	619	+199	16	6	86	
7	Birmingham Moseley	26	13	1	12	745	628	+117	15	6	75	
8	Sale FC	26	13	0	13	655	686	−31	14	6	72	
9	Bishop's Stortford	26	12	0	14	727	676	+51	16	6	70	
10	Dings Crusaders	26	9	1	16	713	905	−192	17	1	56	
11	Sedgley Park	26	9	1	16	677	756	−79	11	5	54	
12	Leicester Lions	26	7	0	19	600	734	−134	11	8	47	
13	Esher (R)	26	7	0	19	690	1069	−379	14	1	43	Relegation place
14	Darlington Mowden Park (R)	26	1	1	24	468	1079	−611	9	3	18	Relegation place

Updated to match(es) played on 26 April 2025. Source: National League Rugby
Rules for classification: If teams are level at any stage, tiebreakers are applied in the following order:
1. Number of matches won
2. Number of matches drawn
3. Difference between points for and against
4. Total number of points for
5. Aggregate number of points scored in matches between tied teams
6. Number of matches won excluding the first match, then the second and so on until the tie is settled

== Fixtures & results ==
Fixtures for the season were published by the RFU on 31 May 2025.

=== Round 1 ===
7 September 2024
14:30

Rotherham Titans	31 – 21	Rosslyn Park

Clifton Lane
Attendance: 525
Referee: Matthew Sharpe

7 September 2024
14:30

(1 BP) Sedgley Park	65 – 24	Esher

Park Lane
Attendance: 401
Referee: Henry Pearson

7 September 2024
15:00

(1 BP) Birmingham Moseley	40 – 20	Dings Crusaders

Billesley Common
Attendance: 596
Referee: Alan Chandrachud

7 September 2024
15:00

(1 BP) Bishop's Stortford	36 – 12	Leicester Lions

Silver Leys
Attendance: 605
Referee: Jamie Parr

7 September 2024
15:00

Blackheath	20 – 31	Richmond

Well Hall
Attendance: 613
Referee: Karl Dickson

7 September 2024
15:00

(2 BP) Plymouth Albion	24 – 28	Sale FC (1 BP)

The Brickfields
Attendance: 1,026
Referee: Adam Wookey

7 September 2024
15:00

(1 BP) Rams	41 – 12	Darlington Mowden Park

Old Bath Road
Attendance: 798
Referee: Timothy Allatt

=== Round 2 ===
14 September 2024
14:00

Leicester Lions	7 – 21	Birmingham Moseley

Westleigh Park
Attendance: 340
Referee: Timothy Allatt

14 September 2024
14:30

(1 BP) Sale FC	24 – 18	Sedgley Park (1 BP)

Heywood Road
Attendance: 834
Referee: Iain Kiy

14 September 2024
15:00

Bishop's Stortford	10 – 39	Blackheath (1 BP)

Silver Leys
Attendance: 650
Referee: Michael Lamb

14 September 2024
15:00

(1 BP) Darlington Mowden Park	28 – 45	Rotherham Titans (1 BP)

Northern Echo Arena
Attendance: 950
Referee: Ben Rayner

14 September 2024
15:00

(1 BP) Dings Crusaders	46 – 29	Plymouth Albion (1 BP)

Shaftesbury Park
Attendance: 672
Referee: Jamie Parr

14 September 2024
15:00

(1 BP) Esher	24 – 43	Rams (1 BP)

Molesey Road
Attendance: 1,032
Referee: Matt Sharp

14 September 2024
15:00

(1 BP) Rosslyn Park	19 – 21	Richmond

The Rock
Attendance: 716
Referee: Adam Wookey

=== Round 3 ===
21 September 2024
14:00

(1 BP) Rotherham Titans	48 – 19	Esher

Clifton Lane
Attendance: 611
Referee: Timothy Allatt

21 September 2024
14:30

Sedgley Park	11 – 20	Dings Crusaders

Park Lane
Attendance: 275
Referee: Ben Wood

21 September 2024
15:00

(1 BP) Birmingham Moseley	28 – 14	Bishop's Stortford

Billesley Common
Attendance: 602
Referee: Henry Pearson

21 September 2024
15:00

(1 BP) Blackheath	32 – 24	Rosslyn Park

Well Hall
Attendance: 627
Referee: Alan Chandrachud

21 September 2024
15:00

Plymouth Albion	27 – 22	Leicester Lions (1 BP)

The Brickfields
Attendance: 1,302
Referee: Matt Sharp

21 September 2024
15:00

(1 BP) Richmond	48 – 7	Darlington Mowden Park

Athletic Ground
Attendance: 800
Referee: Iain Kiy

21 September 2024
16:00 (Note: Game originally scheduled for 15:00 BST but travel difficulties for Sale FC meant kick-off delayed by an hour.)

(1 BP) Rams	33 – 0	Sale FC

Old Bath Road
Attendance: 905
Referee: Jamie Parr

=== Round 4 ===
28 September 2024
14:30

Sale FC	21 – 17	Rotherham Titans (1 BP)

Heywood Road
Attendance: 813
Referee: Adam Wookey

28 September 2024
15:00

(1 BP) Birmingham Moseley	35 – 13	Blackheath

Billesley Common
Attendance: 620
Referee: Ben Rayner

28 September 2024
15:00

Bishop's Stortford	20 – 39	Plymouth Albion (1 BP)

Silver Leys
Attendance: 500
Referee: Ben Wood

28 September 2024
15:00

Darlington Mowden Park	13 – 46	Rosslyn Park (1 BP)

Northern Echo Arena
Attendance: 722
Referee: Timothy Allatt

28 September 2024
15:00

(1 BP) Dings Crusaders	36 – 44	Rams (1 BP)

Shaftesbury Park
Attendance: 604
Referee: Matthew Sharpe

28 September 2024
15:00

Esher	17 – 52	Richmond (1 BP)

Molesey Road
Attendance: 945
Referee: Jamie Parr

28 September 2024
15:00

(1 BP) Leicester Lions	29 – 23	Sedgley Park (1 BP)

Westleigh Park
Attendance: 269
Referee: Henry Pearson

=== Round 5 ===
5 October 2024
14:00

(1 BP) Rotherham Titans	45 – 19	Dings Crusaders

Clifton Lane
Attendance: 615
Referee: Ben Rayner

5 October 2024
14:30

Sedgley Park	12 – 27	Bishop's Stortford (1 BP)

Park Lane
Attendance: 243
Referee: Timothy Allatt

5 October 2024
15:00

(1 BP) Blackheath	40 – 5	Darlington Mowden Park

Well Hall
Attendance: 425
Referee: Adam Wookey

5 October 2024
15:00

(1 BP) Plymouth Albion	35 – 15	Birmingham Moseley

The Brickfields
Attendance: 1,118
Referee: Iain Kiy

5 October 2024
15:00

(1 BP) Rams	54 – 22	Leicester Lions (1 BP)

Old Bath Road
Attendance: 1,175
Referee: Ben Wood

5 October 2024
15:00

(1 BP) Richmond	31 – 27	Sale FC (1 BP)

Athletic Ground
Attendance: 750
Referee: Jamie Parr

5 October 2024
15:00

(1 BP) Rosslyn Park	44 – 26	Esher (1 BP)

The Rock
Attendance: 729
Referee: Michael Lamb

=== Round 6 ===
12 October 2024
14:00

Leicester Lions	17 – 34	Rotherham Titans (1 BP)

Westleigh Park
Attendance: 239
Referee: Jamie Parr

12 October 2024
14:30

Sale FC	15 – 34	Rosslyn Park (1 BP)

Heywood Road
Attendance: 743
Referee: Ben Rayner

12 October 2024
15:00

(1 BP) Birmingham Moseley	28 – 26	Sedgley Park (1 BP)

Billesley Common
Attendance: 582
Referee: Henry Pearson

12 October 2024
15:00

(1 BP) Bishop's Stortford	6 – 10	Rams

Silver Leys
Attendance: 503
Referee: Matthew Sharpe

12 October 2024
15:00

(1 BP) Dings Crusaders	31 – 31	Richmond (1 BP)

Shaftesbury Park
Attendance: 322
Referee: Adam Wookey

12 October 2024
15:00

(1 BP) Esher	31 – 21	Darlington Mowden Park

Molesey Road
Attendance: 730
Referee: Callum Watson

12 October 2024
15:00

(1 BP) Plymouth Albion	29 – 23	Blackheath (1 BP)

The Brickfields
Attendance: 1,310
Referee: Mike Lamb

=== Round 7 ===
19 October 2024
14:00

(1 BP) Rotherham Titans	34 – 45	Bishop's Stortford (1 BP)

Clifton Lane
Attendance: 610
Referee: Owen Taylor

19 October 2024
14:30

(1 BP) Sedgley Park	41 – 26	Plymouth Albion (1 BP)

Park Lane
Attendance: 350
Referee: Adam Wookey

19 October 2024
15:00

(1 BP) Blackheath	50 – 27	Esher (1 BP)

Well Hall
Attendance: 521
Referee: Ben Wood

19 October 2024
15:00

(2 BP) Darlington Mowden Park	34 – 38	Sale FC (1 BP)

Northern Echo Arena
Attendance: 856
Referee: Timothy Allatt

19 October 2024
15:00

(1 BP) Rams	24 – 7	Birmingham Moseley

Old Bath Road
Attendance: 976
Referee: Ben Rayner

19 October 2024
15:00

(1 BP) Richmond	43 – 12	Leicester Lions

Athletic Ground
Attendance: 645
Referee: Callum Watson

19 October 2024
15:00

(1 BP) Rosslyn Park	61 – 24	Dings Crusaders (1 BP)

The Rock
Attendance: 525
Referee: Jamie Parr

=== Round 8 ===
26 October 2024
14:00

(1 BP) Leicester Lions	24 – 48	Rosslyn Park (1 BP)

Westleigh Park
Attendance: 189
Referee: Ben Rayner

26 October 2024
14:30

(1 BP) Sale FC	33 – 22	Esher

Heywood Road
Attendance: 712
Referee: Matthew Sharpe

26 October 2024
14:30

(1 BP) Sedgley Park	24 – 36	Blackheath (1 BP)

Park Lane
Attendance: 378
Referee: Jamie Parr

26 October 2024
15:00

Birmingham Moseley	19 – 30	Rotherham Titans

Billesley Common
Attendance: 703
Referee: Iain Kiy

26 October 2024
15:00

(1 BP) Bishop's Stortford	31 – 43	Richmond (1 BP)

Silver Leys
Attendance: 527
Referee: Henry Pearson

26 October 2024
15:00

(1 BP) Dings Crusaders	46 – 20	Darlington Mowden Park

Shaftesbury Park
Attendance: 333
Referee: Jack Moorhouse

26 October 2024
15:00

(1 BP) Plymouth Albion	16 – 21	Rams

The Brickfields
Attendance: 1,162
Referee: Alan Chandrachud

=== Round 9 ===
8 November 2024
19:45

(1 BP) Richmond	42 – 14	Birmingham Moseley

Athletic Ground
Attendance: 700
Referee: Jamie Parr

8 November 2024
20:00

Rosslyn Park	18 – 15	Bishop's Stortford (1 BP)

The Rock
Attendance: 557
Referee: Alan Chandrachud

9 November 2024
14:00

Rotherham Titans	18 – 17	Plymouth Albion (1 BP)

Clifton Lane
Attendance: 847
Referee: Ben Rayner

9 November 2024
15:00

(1 BP) Blackheath	31 – 27	Sale FC (1 BP)

Well Hall
Attendance: 305
Referee: Callum Watson

9 November 2024
15:00

(1 BP) Darlington Mowden Park	36 – 29	Leicester Lions (2 BP)

Northern Echo Arena
Attendance: 644
Referee: Owen Taylor

9 November 2024
15:00

(1 BP) Esher	51 – 32	Dings Crusaders (1 BP)

Molesey Road
Attendance: 650
Referee: Ben Wood

9 November 2024
15:00

(1 BP) Rams	40 – 22	Sedgley Park

Old Bath Road
Attendance: 803
Referee: Adam Wookey

=== Round 10 ===
16 November 2024
14:00

(2 BP) Leicester Lions	31 – 36	Esher (1 BP)

Westleigh Park
Attendance: 238
Referee: Ben Rayner

16 November 2024
14:30

(2 BP) Sedgley Park	30 – 35	Rotherham Titans (1 BP)

Park Lane
Attendance: 400
Referee: Henry Pearson

16 November 2024
15:00

Birmingham Moseley	27 – 26	Rosslyn Park (2 BP)

Billesley Common
Attendance: 683
Referee: Adam Wookey

16 November 2024
15:00

(1 BP) Bishop's Stortford	33 – 19	Darlington Mowden Park

Silver Leys
Attendance: 535
Referee: Matt Sharp

16 November 2024
15:00

(1 BP) Dings Crusaders	31 – 15	Sale FC

Shaftesbury Park
Attendance: 603
Referee: Iain Kiy

16 November 2024
15:00

(1 BP) Plymouth Albion	15 – 20	Richmond

The Brickfields
Attendance: 1,438
Referee: Ben Wood

16 November 2024
15:00

(1 BP) Rams	33 – 14	Blackheath

Old Bath Road
Attendance: 747
Referee: Jamie Parr

=== Round 11 ===
23 November 2024
14:00

Rotherham Titans	21 – 14	Rams (1 BP)

Clifton Lane
Attendance: 702
Referee: Owen Taylor

23 November 2024
14:30

(1 BP) Sale FC	12 – 15	Leicester Lions

Heywood Road
Attendance: 643
Referee: Timothy Allatt

23 November 2024
15:00

Blackheath	16 – 7	Dings Crusaders

Well Hall
Attendance: 555
Referee: Mike Lamb

23 November 2024
15:00

Darlington Mowden Park	P – P	Birmingham Moseley

Northern Echo Arena

- Postponed due to unplayable pitch caused by weather conditions (snow, followed by wind and rain). Game to be rescheduled for 30 November 2024.

23 November 2024
15:00

Esher	14 – 31	Bishop's Stortford (1 BP)

Molesey Road
Attendance: 350
Referee: Jamie Parr

23 November 2024
15:00

Richmond	21 – 6	Sedgley Park

Athletic Ground
Attendance: 670
Referee: Adam Wookey

23 November 2024
15:00

(1 BP) Rosslyn Park	33 – 29	Plymouth Albion (2 BP)

The Rock
Attendance: 532
Referee: Alan Chandrachud

=== Round 11 (rescheduled game) ===
30 November 2024
15:00

Darlington Mowden Park (1 BP)	7 – 24	Birmingham Moseley

Northern Echo Arena
Attendance: 528
Referee: Henry Pearson

- Game rescheduled from 23 November 2024.

=== Round 12 ===
6 December 2024
19:45

(1 BP) Rams	5 – 7	Richmond

Old Bath Road
Attendance: 1,829 (Note: Record crowd at Old Bath Road.)
Referee: Jamie Parr

7 December 2024
14:00

Leicester Lions	22 – 15	Dings Crusaders (1 BP)

Westleigh Park
Attendance: 342
Referee: Matthew Sharpe

7 December 2024
14:00

Rotherham Titans	15 – 12	Blackheath (1 BP)

Clifton Lane
Attendance: 541
Referee: Ben Wood

7 December 2024
14:30

(1 BP) Plymouth Albion	24 – 12	Darlington Mowden Park

The Brickfields
Attendance: 706
Referee: Adam Wookey

7 December 2024
14:30

(1 BP) Sedgley Park	28 – 0	Rosslyn Park

Park Lane
Attendance: 356
Referee: Ben Rayner

7 December 2024
15:00

Birmingham Moseley	P – P	Esher

Billesley Common

- Postponed due to waterlogged pitch. Game to be rescheduled for 1 February 2025.

7 December 2024
15:00

Bishop's Stortford	14 – 7	Sale FC (1 BP)

Silver Leys
Attendance: 432
Referee: Timothy Allatt

=== Round 13 ===
14 December 2024
14:30

Sale FC	A – A	Birmingham Moseley (1 BP)

Heywood Road
Referee: Henry Pearson

- Game abandoned after 65 minutes due to power failure with Sale FC leading 30 – 25. Initially it was thought that the result would stand but the RFU ruled that the game would be replayed on 21 February 2025.

14 December 2024
15:00

Blackheath	22 – 19	Leicester Lions (1 BP)

Well Hall
Attendance: 370
Referee: Mike Lamb

14 December 2024
15:00

(1 BP) Darlington Mowden Park	37 – 37	Sedgley Park (1 BP)

Northern Echo Arena
Attendance: 500
Referee: Owen Taylor

14 December 2024
15:00

(1 BP) Dings Crusaders	39 – 31	Bishop's Stortford (1 BP)

Shaftesbury Park
Attendance: 616
Referee: Adam Wookey

14 December 2024
15:00

(2 BP) Esher	31 – 34	Plymouth Albion (1 BP)

Molesey Road
Attendance: 500
Referee: Ben Wood

14 December 2024
15:00

(1 BP) Richmond	31 – 29	Rotherham Titans (2 BP)

Athletic Ground
Attendance: 820
Referee: Alan Chandrachud

14 December 2024
15:00

(1 BP) Rosslyn Park	27 – 26	Rams (2 BP)

The Rock
Attendance: 962
Referee: Matt Sharpe

=== Round 14 ===
20 December 2024
19:45

(1 BP) Rams	31 – 3	Esher

Old Bath Road
Attendance: 1,211
Referee: Adam Wookey

21 December 2024
14:00

(1 BP) Rotherham Titans	29 – 14	Darlington Mowden Park

Clifton Lane
Attendance: 878
Referee: Timothy Allatt

21 December 2024
14:30

Sedgley Park	14 – 12	Sale FC (1 BP)

Park Lane
Attendance: 1,303
Referee: Ben Wood

21 December 2024
15:00

Birmingham Moseley	27 – 10	Leicester Lions

Billesley Common
Attendance: 625
Referee: Ben Rayner

21 December 2024
15:00

(1 BP) Blackheath	39 – 32	Bishop's Stortford (2 BP)

Well Hall
Attendance: 357
Referee: Holly Wood

21 December 2024
15:00

(1 BP) Plymouth Albion	31 – 3	Dings Crusaders

The Brickfields
Attendance: 1,111
Referee: Iain Kiy

21 December 2024
15:00

Richmond	17 – 25	Rosslyn Park

Athletic Ground
Attendance: 1,142
Referee: Henry Pearson

=== Round 15 ===
11 January 2025
14:00

Leicester Lions	P – P	Plymouth Albion

Westleigh Road

- Postponed due to frozen pitch. Game to be rescheduled for 1 February 2025.

11 January 2025
14:30

Sale FC	P – P	Rams

Heywood Road

- Postponed due to frozen pitch. Game to be rescheduled for 1 February 2025.

11 January 2025
15:00

Bishop's Stortford	P – P	Birmingham Moseley

Silver Leys

- Postponed due to frozen pitch. Game to be rescheduled for 29 March 2025.

11 January 2025
15:00

Darlington Mowden Park	P – P	Richmond

Northern Echo Arena

- Postponed due to frozen pitch. Game to be rescheduled for 1 February 2025.

11 January 2025
15:00

(1 BP) Dings Crusaders	35 – 3	Sedgley Park

Shaftesbury Park
Attendance: 632
Referee: Holly Wood

11 January 2025
15:00

Esher	P – P	Rotherham Titans

Molesey Road

- Postponed due to frozen pitch. Game to be rescheduled for 22 February 2025.

11 January 2025
15:00

(1 BP) Rosslyn Park	26 – 25	Blackheath (1 BP)

The Rock
Attendance: 876
Referee: Adam Wookey

=== Round 16 ===
17 January 2025
19:30

(1 BP) Richmond	40 – 22	Esher

Athletic Ground
Attendance: 1,100
Referee: Holly Wood

18 January 2025
14:00

Rotherham Titans	23 – 17	Sale FC (1 BP)

Clifton Lane
Attendance: 782
Referee: Matthew Sharpe

18 January 2025
14:30

Sedgley Park	25 – 10	Leicester Lions

Park Lane
Attendance: 386
Referee: Timothy Allatt

18 January 2025
15:00

(1 BP) Blackheath	51 – 26	Birmingham Moseley (1 BP)

Well Hall
Attendance: 428
Referee: Ben Wood

18 January 2025
15:00

(1 BP) Plymouth Albion	24 – 21	Bishop's Stortford (1 BP)

Brickfields
Attendance: 1,248
Referee: Adam Wookey

18 January 2025
15:00

(1 BP) Rams	26 – 17	Dings Crusaders

Old Bath Road
Attendance: 815
Referee: Alan Chandrachud

18 January 2025
15:00

(1 BP) Rosslyn Park	49 – 24	Darlington Mowden Park (1 BP)

The Rock
Attendance: 330
Referee: Michael Lamb

=== Round 17 ===
25 January 2025
14:00

Leicester Lions	19 – 36	Rams (1 BP)

Westleigh Park
Attendance: 250
Referee: Henry Pearson

25 January 2025
14:30

(1 BP) Sale FC	32 – 18	Richmond

Heywood Road
Attendance: 734
Referee: Ben Wood

25 January 2025
15:00

(2 BP) Birmingham Moseley	32 – 33	Plymouth Albion (1 BP)

Billesley Common
Attendance: 825
Referee: Timothy Allatt

25 January 2025
15:00

(1 BP) Bishop's Stortford	19 – 22	Sedgley Park

Silver Leys
Attendance: 560
Referee: Jack Moorhouse

25 January 2025
15:00

Darlington Mowden Park	P – P	Blackheath

Northern Echo Arena

- Postponed due to frozen pitch. Game to be rescheduled for 22 February 2025.

25 January 2025
15:00

(1 BP) Dings Crusaders	26 – 45	Rotherham Titans (1 BP)

Shaftesbury Park
Attendance: 607
Referee: Jamie Parr

25 January 2025
15:00

(1 BP) Esher	54 – 42	Rosslyn Park (1 BP)

Molesey Road
Attendance: 845
Referee: Adam Wookey

=== Rounds 12 & 15 (rescheduled games) ===
1 February 2025
14:00

(1 BP) Leicester Lions	17 – 20	Plymouth Albion

Westleigh Road
Attendance: 208
Referee: Jamie Parr

- Game rescheduled from 11 January 2025.

1 February 2025
14:30

Sale FC	25 – 22	Rams (2 BP)

Heywood Road
Attendance: 728
Referee: Timothy Allatt

- Game rescheduled from 11 January 2025.

1 February 2025
15:00

(2 BP) Birmingham Moseley	24 – 31	Esher (1 BP)

Billesley Common
Attendance: 442
Referee: Adam Wookey

- Game rescheduled from 7 December 2024.

1 February 2025
15:00

Darlington Mowden Park	17 – 33	Richmond (1 BP)

Northern Echo Arena
Attendance: 534
Referee: Jack Moorhouse

- Game rescheduled from 11 January 2025.

=== Round 18 ===
8 February 2025
14:00

Rotherham Titans	24 – 7	Leicester Lions

Clifton Lane
Attendance: 560
Referee: Timothy Allatt

8 February 2025
14:30

Sedgley Park	20 – 28	Birmingham Moseley

Park Lane
Attendance: 387
Referee: Matthew Sharpe

8 February 2025
15:00

(1 BP) Blackheath	19 – 22	Plymouth Albion

Well Hall
Attendance: 500
Referee: Callum Watson

8 February 2025
15:00

(1 BP) Darlington Mowden Park	22 – 29	Esher (1 BP)

Northern Echo Arena
Attendance: 410
Referee: Owen Taylor

8 February 2025
15:00

(1 BP) Rams	25 – 34	Bishop's Stortford (1 BP)

Old Bath Road
Attendance: 753
Referee: Ben Wood

8 February 2025
15:00

(1 BP) Richmond	31 – 14	Dings Crusaders

Athletic Ground
Attendance: 603
Referee: Alan Chandrachud

8 February 2025
15:00

(1 BP) Rosslyn Park	52 – 33	Sale FC (1 BP)

The Rock
Attendance: 356
Referee: Holly Wood

=== Round 19 ===
15 February 2025
14:00

Leicester Lions	10 – 26	Richmond (1 BP)

Westleigh Park
Attendance: 140
Referee: Ben Wood

15 February 2025
14:30

(1 BP) Sale FC	33 – 7	Darlington Mowden Park

Heywood Road
Attendance: 703
Referee: Michael Lamb

15 February 2025
15:00

Birmingham Moseley	19 – 0	Rams

Billesley Common
Attendance: 525
Referee: Henry Pearson

15 February 2025
15:00

(1 BP) Bishop's Stortford	11 – 17	Rotherham Titans

Silver Leys
Attendance: 535
Referee: Matthew Sharpe

15 February 2025
15:00

Dings Crusaders	19 – 50	Rosslyn Park (1 BP)

Shaftesbury Park
Attendance: 529
Referee: Alan Chandrachud

15 February 2025
15:00

Esher	22 – 64	Blackheath (1 BP)

Molesey Road
Attendance: 912 (Note: The Rugby Paper gave two attendance figures for Esher's home game versus Blackheath on 15 February 2025 - 502 on the match report and 912 on the results page. The larger figure as it was a local(ish) game and Esher have been improving results.)
Referee: Holly Wood

15 February 2025
15:00

(1 BP) Plymouth Albion	38 – 35	Sedgley Park (2 BP)

The Brickfields
Attendance: 1,447 (Note: The Rugby Paper gave an attendance of 1,305 while Plymouth Albion's X feed gave the crowd number as 1,447. The official Albion figure has been used.)
Referee: Adam Wookey

=== Rounds 13, 15 & 17 (rescheduled games) ===
21 February 2025
14:30

(1 BP) Sale FC	22 – 10	Birmingham Moseley

Heywood Road
Attendance: 634
Referee: Henry Pearson

- Game rescheduled from 14 December 2024.

22 February 2025
14:45

(1 BP) Esher	34 – 68	Rotherham Titans (1 BP)

Molesey Road
Attendance: 485
Referee: Alan Chandrachud

- Game rescheduled from 11 January 2025.

22 February 2025
15:00

Darlington Mowden Park	7 – 52	Blackheath (1 BP)

Northern Echo Arena
Attendance: 434
Referee: Matthew Sharpe

- Game rescheduled from 25 January 2025.

=== Round 20 ===
1 March 2025
14:00

Rotherham Titans	28 – 27	Birmingham Moseley (1 BP)

Clifton Lane
Attendance: 802
Referee: Ben Rayner

1 March 2025
15:00

(1 BP) Blackheath	22 – 25	Sedgley Park

Well Hall
Attendance: 715
Referee: Alan Chandrachud

1 March 2025
15:00

(1 BP) Darlington Mowden Park	24 – 31	Dings Crusaders (1 BP)

Northern Echo Arena
Attendance: 452
Referee: Timothy Allatt

1 March 2025
15:00

Esher	21 – 37	Sale FC (1 BP)

Molesey Road
Attendance: 664
Referee: Michael Lamb

1 March 2025
15:00

(1 BP) Rams	33 – 47	Plymouth Albion (1 BP)

Old Bath Road
Attendance: 973
Referee: Henry Pearson

1 March 2025
15:00

(1 BP) Richmond	38 – 21	Bishop's Stortford

Athletic Ground
Attendance: 909
Referee: Jamie Parr

1 March 2025
15:00

Rosslyn Park	21 – 19	Leicester Lions (1 BP)

The Rock
Attendance: 620
Referee: Ben Wood

=== Round 21 ===
7 March 2025
19:45

(1 BP) Birmingham Moseley	35 – 35	Richmond (1 BP)

Billesley Common
Attendance: 605
Referee: Iain Kiy

8 March 2025
14:00

(1 BP) Leicester Lions	75 – 0	Darlington Mowden Park

Westleigh Park
Attendance: 205
Referee: George Ounsley

8 March 2025
14:30

Sale FC	19 – 33	Blackheath (1 BP)

Heywood Road
Attendance: 733
Referee: Henry Pearson

8 March 2025
14:30

(1 BP) Sedgley Park	34 – 33	Rams (2 BP)

Park Lane
Attendance: 407
Referee: Ben Rayner

8 March 2025
15:00

(1 BP) Bishop's Stortford	28 – 40	Rosslyn Park (1 BP)

Silver Leys
Attendance: 649
Referee: Alan Chandrachud

8 March 2025
15:00

(1 BP) Dings Crusaders	47 – 35	Esher (1 BP)

Shaftesbury Park
Attendance: 677
Referee: Adam Wookey

8 March 2025
15:00

Plymouth Albion	23 – 20	Rotherham Titans (1 BP)

The Brickfields
Attendance: 1,342
Referee: Matthew Sharpe

=== Round 22 ===
15 March 2025
14:00

(1 BP) Rosslyn Park	29 – 22	Birmingham Moseley (2 BP)

The Rock
Attendance: 502
Referee: Alex Powdrell

15 March 2025
14:00

(1 BP) Rotherham Titans	38 – 29	Sedgley Park (1 BP)

Clifton Lane
Attendance: 740
Referee: Henry Pearson

15 March 2025
14:30

(1 BP) Sale FC	54 – 38	Dings Crusaders (1 BP)

Heywood Road
Attendance: 701
Referee: Timothy Allatt

15 March 2025
14:45

Esher	15 – 26	Leicester Lions (1 BP)

Molesey Road
Attendance: 687
Referee: Ben Wood

15 March 2025
15:00

(1 BP) Blackheath	39 – 33	Rams (2 BP)

Well Hall
Attendance: 751
Referee: Michael Lamb

15 March 2025
15:00

Darlington Mowden Park	12 – 41	Bishop's Stortford (1 BP)

Northern Echo Arena
Attendance: 336
Referee: Jack Moorhouse

- Darlington Mowden Park are relegated.

15 March 2025
15:00

(1 BP) Richmond	54 – 0	Plymouth Albion

Athletic Ground
Attendance: 803
Referee: Alan Chandrachud

=== Round 23 ===
22 March 2025
14:00

(2 BP) Leicester Lions	31 – 37	Sale FC (1 BP)

Westleigh Park
Attendance: 342
Referee: Ben Rayner

22 March 2025
14:30

(1 BP) Sedgley Park	26 – 50	Richmond (1 BP)

Park Lane
Attendance: 450
Referee: Jack Moorhouse

22 March 2025
15:00

(1 BP) Birmingham Moseley	69 – 14	Darlington Mowden Park

Billesley Common
Attendance: 875
Referee: Callum Watson

22 March 2025
15:00

(1 BP) Dings Crusaders	26 – 43	Blackheath (1 BP)

Shaftesbury Park
Attendance: 742
Referee: Timothy Allatt

22 March 2025
15:00

(1 BP) Plymouth Albion	24 – 30	Rosslyn Park (1 BP)

The Brickfields
Attendance: 2,410
Referee: Henry Pearson

22 March 2025
15:00

(1 BP) Bishop's Stortford	52 – 28	Esher (1 BP)

Silver Leys
Attendance: 709
Referee: Alan Chandrachud

22 March 2025
15:00

(1 BP) Rams	30 – 19	Rotherham Titans

Old Bath Road
Attendance: 803
Referee: Jamie Parr

=== Round 15 (rescheduled game) ===
29 March 2025
15:00

(1 BP) Bishop's Stortford	31 – 29	Birmingham Moseley (2 BP)

Silver Leys
Attendance: 503
Referee: Alan Chandrachud

- Game rescheduled from 11 January 2025.

=== Round 24 ===
4 April 2025
19:45

(1 BP) Richmond	47 – 24	Rams

Athletic Ground
Attendance: 1,421
Referee: Ben Wood

- Richmond are champions following Saturday's results.

5 April 2025
14:30

(1 BP) Darlington Mowden Park	26 – 39	Plymouth Albion (1 BP)

Northern Echo Arena
Attendance: 368
Referee: George Ounsley

5 April 2025
14:30

(1 BP) Sale FC	26 – 34	Bishop's Stortford (1 BP)

Heywood Road
Attendance: 694
Referee: Ben Simpson

5 April 2025
15:00

(1 BP) Blackheath	31 – 24	Rotherham Titans (2 BP)

Well Hall
Attendance: 925
Referee: Jamie Parr

5 April 2025
15:00

(1 BP) Dings Crusaders	41 – 39	Leicester Lions (2 BP)

Shaftesbury Park
Attendance: 515
Referee: Adam Wookey

5 April 2025
15:00

Esher	19 – 59	Birmingham Moseley (1 BP)

Molesey Road
Attendance: 630
Referee: Alan Chandrachud

5 April 2025
15:00

(1 BP) Rosslyn Park	45 – 23	Sedgley Park

The Rock
Attendance: 652
Referee: Matthew Sharpe

=== Round 25 ===
12 April 2025
14:00

(1 BP) Leicester Lions	31 – 26	Blackheath (2 BP)

Westleigh Park
Attendance: 360
Referee: Matthew Sharpe

12 April 2025
14:00

(1 BP) Rotherham Titans	40 – 38	Richmond (2 BP)

Clifton Lane
Attendance: 780
Referee: Henry Pearson

12 April 2025
14:30

(1 BP) Sedgley Park	63 – 24	Darlington Mowden Park (1 BP)

Park Lane
Attendance: 412
Referee: Alex Powdrell

12 April 2025
15:00

(2 BP) Birmingham Moseley	33 – 35	Sale FC (1 BP)

Billesley Common
Attendance: 1,111
Referee: Ben Wood

12 April 2025
15:00

(1 BP) Bishop's Stortford	61 – 24	Dings Crusaders (1 BP)

Silver Leys
Attendance: 806
Referee: Ben Rayner

12 April 2025
15:00

(1 BP) Plymouth Albion	59 – 0	Esher

The Brickfields
Attendance: 1,922
Referee: Jamie Parr

12 April 2025
15:00

(1 BP) Rams	49 – 40	Rosslyn Park (1 BP)

Old Bath Road
Attendance: 1,237
Referee: Adam Wookey

=== Round 26 ===
26 April 2025
15:00

(1 BP) Darlington Mowden Park	24 – 54	Rams (1 BP)

Northern Echo Arena
Attendance: 536
Referee: Timothy Allatt

26 April 2025
15:00

(1 BP) Dings Crusaders	26 – 47	Birmingham Moseley (1 BP)

Shaftesbury Park
Attendance: 714
Referee: Jack Moorhouse

26 April 2025
15:00

(1 BP) Esher	55 – 14	Sedgley Park

Molesey Road
Attendance: 835
Referee: Michael Lamb

- Esher are relegated due to Leicester Lions result versus Bishop's Stortford.

26 April 2025
15:00

(1 BP) Leicester Lions	38 – 29	Bishop's Stortford (1 BP)

Westleigh Park
Attendance: 503
Referee: Alan Chandrachud

26 April 2025
15:00

(1 BP) Richmond	40 – 26	Blackheath (1 BP)

Athletic Ground
Attendance: 1,950
Referee: Jamie Parr

26 April 2025
15:00

(1 BP) Rosslyn Park	56 – 26	Rotherham Titans (1 BP)

The Rock
Attendance: 850
Referee: Ben Wood

26 April 2025
15:00

(1 BP) Sale FC	26 – 46	Plymouth Albion (1 BP)

Heywood Road
Attendance: 812
Referee: Ben Rayner

== Attendances ==
Club	Home Games	Total	Average	Highest	Lowest	% Capacity
Birmingham Moseley	13	8,794	676	1,111	442	14%
Bishop's Stortford	13	7,514	578	806	432	36%
Blackheath	13	7,092	546	925	305	33%
Darlington Mowden Park	13	7,270	559	950	336	2%
Dings Crusaders	13	7,566	582	742	322	26%
Esher	13	9,265	713	1,032	350	20%
Leicester Lions	13	3,625	279	503	140	14%
Plymouth Albion	13	17,542	1,349	2,410	706	16%
Rams	13	12,859	989	1,829	747	49%
Richmond	13	12,313	947	1,950	603	21%
Rosslyn Park	13	8,207	631	962	330	32%
Rotherham Titans	13	8,993	692	878	525	28%
Sale FC	13	9,484	730	834	634	22%
Sedgley Park	13	5,748	442	1,303	243	15%

== Individual statistics ==
=== Top points scorers ===
Rank	Player	Team	Points
1	Richard Hayes	Rotherham Titans	297
2	Callum Grieve	Richmond	258
3	Tom Flitch	Blackheath	217
4	Thomas Putt	Plymouth Albion	213
5	Joshua Bragman	Rosslyn Park	194
6	Fraser Honey	Rams	163
7	Warren Seals	Sedgley Park	150
8	Sam Morley	Esher	147
9	Luke Bouchier	Leicester Lions	141
10	Jack Jolly	Birmingham Moseley	113

=== Top try scorers ===
Rank	Player	Team	Tries
1	Rhys Henderson	Sedgley Park	20
2	Jasper Cameron	Rosslyn Park	19
2	William Harding	Blackheath	19
3	Joshua Brown	Sale FC	18
4	Zachary Clow	Rams	16
5	Max Hayman	Rams	15
6	Craig Duncan	Plymouth Albion	14
6	Jake Lloyd	Blackheath	14
7	Callum Bustin	Rotherham Titans	13
7	Tomas Gwilliam	Dings Crusaders	13
7	Axel Kalling-Smith	Rams	13
7	Alexander Rayment	Bishop's Stortford	13
7	Alexander Schwarz	Richmond	13
7	Aquile Smith	Birmingham Moseley	13

== See also ==
- 2024–25 National League 2 East
- 2024–25 National League 2 North
- 2024–25 National League 2 West
