= Paton Field =

Rugby ground for Caldy RUFC in Wirral, England

Coordinates: 53°21′34″N 3°08′34″W

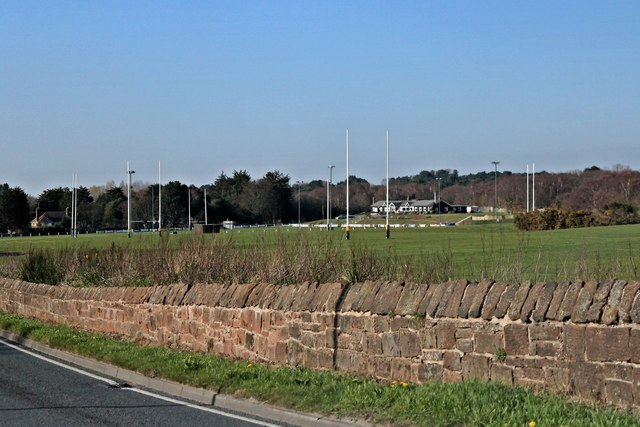
- Interactive map of Paton Field
- Full name: Paton Field
- Location: Telegraph Road, WIRRAL, CH48 1NZ
- Owner: Caldy RFC
- Capacity: 4,000

Tenant
- Caldy RFC

Paton Field is located on Telegraph Road, in Caldy, on the Wirral Peninsula, England. The stadium is the home of Caldy RFC.
