= 2026–27 National League 2 West =

Rugby union competition in England

- Countries: England
- Date: 4 September 2026 – April 2027
- Matches played: 7
- Tries scored: 72 (average 10.3 per match)

The 2026–27 National League 2 West is the fifth season of the fourth-tier (west) of the English domestic rugby union competitions; one of three at this level. The others are National League 2 East and National League 2 North.

== Structure ==
The league consists of fourteen teams who play the others on a home and away basis, to make a total of 26 matches each. The champions are promoted to National League 1 while the runner-up goes into the four team National 2 play-offs with the runners-up from National League 2 North and National League 2 East and the 11th placed side in National League 1.

The bottom two teams are relegated to either Regional 1 Midlands or Regional 1 South West while the 12th placed side goes into the four team Regional 1 play-offs with the 12th placed sides from National 2 East and National 2 North, as well as the Regional 1 play-off winner.

The results of the matches contribute points to the league as follows:

- 4 points are awarded for a win
- 2 points are awarded for a draw
- 0 points are awarded for a loss, however
- 1 losing (bonus) point is awarded to a team that loses a match by 7 points or fewer
- 1 additional (bonus) point is awarded to a team scoring 4 tries or more in a match.

=== Participating teams and locations ===
Departing were the champions Camborne promoted to National League 1, while Syston (14th) were relegated to Regional 1 Midlands. Also departing were Chester (11th), on a level transfer to National League 2 North.

Originally, Loughborough Students (13th) were also relegated to Regional 1 Midlands, with Macclesfield due to take a place in the league, having been moved on a level transfer from National League 2 North. However, Macclesfield declined to accept the league allocation and were consequently relegated to Regional 1 North West, while Burton were transferred from that league to Regional 1 Midlands. Consequently, Loughborough Students earned a reprieve from relegation and were reinstated to this league.

Team	Ground	Capacity	City/Area	Previous season
Barnstaple	Pottington Road	2,000 (575 seats)	Barnstaple, Devon	7th
Bournville	Avery Fields		Edgbaston, Birmingham, West Midlands	Promoted from Regional 1 Midlands (champions)
Cinderford	Beavis Memorial Ground	2,500	Cinderford, Gloucestershire	5th
Clifton	Station Road	2,200 (200 seats)	Cribbs Causeway, Patchway, Bristol	Relegated from National League 1 (12th)
Devonport Services	The Rectory Field	2,000	Devonport, Plymouth, Devon	Promoted from Regional 1 South West (champions)
Exeter University	Topsham Sports Ground (Note: Exeter University would also play one home game at Bonfire Field, home of nearby Topsham RFC.)		Exeter, Devon	12th
Hinckley	De Montfort Park	2,000	Hinckley, Leicestershire	3rd
Hornets	The Nest, Hutton Moor Park	1,100 (100 stand)	Weston-super-Mare, Somerset	6th
Loughborough Students	East Park (Note: Since relegation from the 2018–19 National League 1 Loughborough Students have switched games from the Loughborough University Stadium to nearby East Park.)	1,000	Loughborough, Leicestershire	13th (reprieved from relegation)
Luctonians	Mortimer Park	2,500 (300 seats)	Kingsland, Herefordshire	2nd
Lymm	Crouchley Lane	1,000	Lymm, Cheshire	9th
Old Redcliffians	Scotland Lane	1,000	Brislington, Bristol	8th
Redruth	Recreation Ground	3,500 (580 seats)	Redruth, Cornwall	10th
Taunton Titans	Summerfield Stadium (Note: Formerly known as Veritas Park.)	2,000 (198 seats)	Taunton, Somerset	4th

Locations of the 2026–27 National League 2 West teams

== League table ==
2026–27 National League 2 West table
Pos	Team	Pld	W	D	L	PF	PA	PD	TB	LB	Pts	Qualification
1	Luctonians	10	9	0	1	410	184	+226	9	0	45	Promotion place
2	Clifton	10	9	0	1	420	282	+138	9	0	45	Promotion play-off
3	Hinckley	10	9	0	1	374	181	+193	8	0	44	
4	Redruth	10	8	0	2	368	185	+183	7	2	41	
5	Cinderford	10	7	0	3	342	344	−2	7	0	35	
6	Old Redcliffians	10	6	0	4	326	294	+32	9	1	34	
7	Loughborough Students	11	4	1	6	387	390	−3	9	3	30	
8	Lymm	10	5	0	5	293	338	−45	7	2	29	
9	Taunton Titans	10	5	0	5	339	249	+90	6	2	28	
10	Hornets	10	3	0	7	352	355	−3	8	4	24	
11	Barnstaple	10	3	0	7	222	315	−93	4	2	18	
12	Bournville	10	2	1	7	318	538	−220	7	1	18	Relegation play-off
13	Exeter University	11	0	0	11	277	497	−220	7	1	8	Relegation place
14	Devonport Services	10	0	0	10	233	509	−276	5	1	6	Relegation place

Updated to match(es) played on 20 November 2026. Source: National League Rugby
Rules for classification: If teams are level at any stage, tiebreakers are applied in the following order:
1. Number of matches won
2. Number of matches drawn
3. Difference between points for and against
4. Total number of points for
5. Aggregate number of points scored in matches between tied teams
6. Number of matches won excluding the first match, then the second and so on until the tie is settled

== Fixtures & results ==
=== Round 1 ===
4 September 2026
19:45

(1 BP) Taunton Titans	53 – 17	Devonport Services
Try: Akinrowo 33' c Mead 37' c Elliott 43' c Parsons 47' m Whitlock 59' c Holmes 66' c Batty 78' c Con: Putt (6/7) 34', 38', 44', 60', 67', 79'; Pen: Putt (2/2) 23', 54'	Report	Try: Brown 19' c McFarlane 25' m Rickard 52' m Con: Jarvis (1/1) 20'; Brown (0/2)

Summerfield Stadium
Referee: James Milliner-Woodcock

5 September 2026
14:15

(1 BP) Lymm	50 – 27	Loughborough Students (1 BP)
Try: Hampson 4' c, 79' c Penalty Try; Manaton 45' m, 72' c Lilley 57' c Heaton 76' c Con: Shard (5/6) 5', 58', 73', 77', 80'; Pen: Shard (1/1) 62'	Report	Try: Rodriguez-Davies 9' m, 21' c, 42' c Roberts 64' m Con: Webb (1/1) 37'; Pen: Webb (2/4) 22', 43'

Crouchley Lane
Referee: Thomas Hurdley

5 September 2026
15:00

(1 BP) Cinderford	31 – 48	Clifton (1 BP)
Try: Saint 13' c, 27' c Perkins 20' m, 35' m Baker 71' c Con: Winfield (3/5) 14', 28', 72'	Report	Try: Talbot 6' m Tovey 23' c, 43' c Carter 53' c Malone 56' m Hamid 76' c Thomas 80+4' c Con: Quinlan (5/7) 24', 44', 54', 77', 80+5'; Pen: Quinlan (1/1) 65'

Beavis Memorial Ground
Referee: Peter Connor

5 September 2026
15:00

(1 BP) Exeter University	24 – 53	Barnstaple (1 BP)
Try: Clark 11' c Warren 41' m Woodman 62' c Thomas 72' m Con: Walker (1/2) 12'; Lane (1/2) 63'	Report	Try: Lee 7' c Stretch 23' m, 66' c, 69' m Saunders 26' m Moore 33' m Johnson 45' m, 55' c Petherbridge 76' c Con: Johnson (1/3) 8'; Saunders (3/6) 56', 67', 77'

Topsham Sports Ground
Referee: Cameron Livingstone

5 September 2026
15:00

Hinckley	19 – 27	Luctonians
Try: Callan 16' c, 70' c Read 21' m Con: Smith (2/3) 17', 71'	Report	Try: Kelly 27' c Link 47' c, 53' c Con: Randell (3/3) 28', 48', 54'; Pen: Randell (2/2) 3', 34'

Leicester Road
Referee: Mark Hyde

5 September 2026
15:00

(2 BP) Hornets	24 – 27	Old Redcliffians (1 BP)
Try: Hawkins 9' m Sheppard 39' c Lockwood 67' m Russell 70' c Con: Gapper (2/4) 40', 71'	Report	Try: Mclean 17' m, 27' m, 59' m Murphy 77' c, 80' m Con: Tomlin (0/3); Stapleton (1/2) 78'

The Nest
Referee: Haydn Davies

5 September 2026
15:00

(1 BP) Redruth	61 – 10	Bourneville
Try: Clifford 1' m Counter 8' c, 31' c James 21' c, 27' c,37' c, 55' c Cowan-Dickie 69' c Baragwanath 78' c Con: Cummins (8/9) 8', 22', 28', 32', 38', 55', 70', 78'	Report	Try: van Deventer 72' m Collingwood 80' m Con: Fewtrell (0/2)

Recreation Ground
Referee: James Walker

=== Round 2 ===
12 September 2026
14:00

Loughborough Students	17 – 26	Hinckley
Try: Temperley 14' m Finch 73' m Webb 80' c Con: Webb (1/3) 80'	Report	Try: James 5' c, 24' c, 63' c Catcheside 68' m Con: Smith (3/4) 6', 25', 64'

East Park
Referee: Thomas Hurdley

12 September 2026
14:30

Barnstaple	12 – 24	Taunton Titans
Try: Moore 51' c Johnson 72' m Con: Johnson (1/2) 52'	Report	Try: Guy 14' c Vickery 44' c Johns 75' c Con: Putt (3/3) 15', 45', 76'; Pen: Putt (1/1) 68'

Pottington Road
Referee: James Walker

12 September 2026
14:30

Devonport Services	33 – 68	Redruth
Try: Bond 12' c Gliddon 52' c, 59' m Penalty Try; White 79' c Con: Brown (3/4) 13', 52', 80'		Try: Cowan-Dickie 3' c Bray 8' c, 40' c Simmons 16' c Wolstencroft 24' m Clifford 32' c Baragwanath 67' c, 79' c Love 70' c Cummins 80' c Con: Cummins (9/10) 4', 9', 17', 33', 40', 68', 72', 79', 80'

The Rectory
Referee: Spencer Pearce

12 September 2026
15:00

Bournville	43 – 38	Lymm
Try: Tanner 2' c Shaw 17' c, 53' m van Deventer 25' c Smith 62' c Grimshaw 78' c Con: Fewtrell (5/6) 3', 18', 26', 63', 79'; Pen: Fewtrell (1/1) 22'	Report	Try: Lilley 33' c Cope 38' c Mukherjee 45'; Reynolds 58' c, 70' c Con: Shard (5/5) 34', 39', 46', 59', 71'; Pen: Shard (1/1) 80'

Avery Fields
Referee: Mark Hyde

12 September 2026
15:00

Clifton	35 – 26	Old Redcliffians
Try: Hutchinson 8' c Anderson 26' c Hamid 35' c Power 59' c Grundy 64' c Con: Quinlan (5/5) 9', 27', 36', 60', 65'	Report	Try: Hamilton 19' c Van Keergergen 23' c Bailey 48' c Stapleton 72' m Con: Tomlin (3/4) 20' , 24', 49'

Station Road
Referee: Philip Russell

12 September 2026
15:00

Exeter University	36 – 54	Hornets
Try: Benson 12' c Woodman 32' m Starkey 39' m Dowse 59' m Barrow 69' c Golden Clark 71' c Con: Lane (3/6) 13', 70', 72'	Report	Try: Sheppard 5' c, 47' c Griffith 20' c, 25' c Davis 29' c, 72' m Lockwood 53' c Gapper 63' c Con: Gapper (7/7) 6', 21', 25', 30', 48', 54', 64' Russell (0/1)

Topsham Sports Ground
Referee: Dan Parrott

12 September 2026
15:00

Luctonians	47 – 0	Cinderford
Try: Goodall 7' m, 44' c Harriott-Davis 25' c, 67' c Mear 30' c Link 35' c, 39' c Con: Goodall (6/7) 26', 31', 36', 40', 45', 68'	Report

Mortimer Park
Referee: Nathan Howarth

=== Round 3 ===
19 September 2026
14:00

Exeter University	21 – 61	Taunton Titans (1 BP)

Bonfire Field

19 September 2026
14:15

(1 BP) Lymm	35 – 31	Devonport Services (2 BP)

Crouchley Lane

19 September 2026
15:00

(1 BP) Cinderford	53 – 31	Loughborough Students (1 BP)

Beavis Memorial Ground

19 September 2026
15:00

(1 BP) Hinckley	70 – 28	Bournville (1 BP)

Leicester Road

19 September 2026
15:00

(2 BP) Hornets	32 – 34	Clifton (1 BP)

The Nest

19 September 2026
15:00

Old Redcliffians	19 – 33	Luctonians (1 BP)

Scotland Lane

19 September 2026
15:00

Redruth	28 – 14	Barnstaple

Recreation Ground

=== Round 4 ===
26 September 2026
14:00

(1 BP) Barnstaple	21 – 27	Lymm (1 BP)

Pottingham Road

26 September 2026
14:00

(2 BP) Bournville	57 – 62	Cinderford (1 BP)

Avery Fields

26 September 2026
14:00

(1 BP) Loughborough Students	41 – 40	Old Redcliffians (2 BP)

East Park

26 September 2026
14:30

Devonport Services	12 – 51	Hinckley (1 BP)

The Rectory

26 September 2026
15:00

Exeter University	19 – 34	Redruth (1 BP)

Topsham Sports Ground

26 September 2026
15:00

(1 BP) Luctonians	31 – 19	Clifton

Mortimer Park

26 September 2026
15:00

(1 BP) Taunton Titans	36 – 34	Hornets (2 BP)

Summerfield Stadium

=== Round 5 ===
3 October 2026
14:15

(1 BP) Lymm	36 – 21	Exeter University

Crouchley Lane

3 October 2026
15:00

(1 BP) Cinderford	54 – 33	Devonport Services (1 BP)

Bell Sports and Rugby Park

3 October 2026
15:00

(1 BP) Clifton	36 – 31	Loughborough Students (2 BP)

Station Road

3 October 2026
15:00

(1 BP) Hinckley	49 – 5	Barnstaple

Leicester Road

3 October 2026
15:00

(1 BP) Hornets	22 – 29	Luctonians (1 BP)

The Nest

3 October 2026
15:00

(1 BP) Old Redcliffians	49 – 36	Bournville (1 BP)

Scotland Lane

3 October 2026
15:00

(1 BP) Redruth	36 – 31	Taunton Titans (2 BP)

Recreation Ground

=== Round 6 ===
10 October 2026
14:00

(1 BP) Loughborough Students	50 – 31	Luctonians

East Park

10 October 2026
14:30

(1 BP) Barnstaple	34 – 22	Cinderford (1 BP)

Pottington Road

10 October 2026
14:30

Devonport Services	19 – 33	Old Redcliffians (1 BP)

The Rectory

10 October 2026
15:00

(1 BP) Bourneville	38 – 68	Clifton (1 BP)

Avery Fields

10 October 2026
15:00

Exeter University	19 – 38	Hinckley (1 BP)

Topsham Sports Ground

10 October 2026
15:00

(1 BP) Redruth	38 – 14	Hornets

Recreation Ground

10 October 2026
15:00

(1 BP) Taunton	59 – 12	Lymm

Summerfield Stadium

=== Round 7 ===
17 October 2026
14:15

Lymm	7 – 39	Redruth (1 BP)

Crouchley Lane

17 October 2026
15:00

(1 BP) Cinderford	40 – 32	Exeter University (1 BP)

Bell Sports and Rugby Park

17 October 2026
15:00

(1 BP) Clifton	75 – 12	Devonport Services

Station Road

17 October 2026
15:00

(1 BP) Hinckley	24 – 17	Taunton Titans (1 BP)

Leicester Road

17 October 2026
15:00

(1 BP) Hornets	51 – 45	Loughborough Students (2 BP)

The Nest

17 October 2026
15:00

(1 BP) Luctonians	73 – 5	Bourneville

Mortimer Park

17 October 2026
15:00

(1 BP) Old Redcliffians	31 – 24	Barnstaple (2 BP)

Scotland Lane

=== Round 8 ===
31 October 2026
14:00

(1 BP) Barnstaple	28 – 36	Clifton (1 BP)

Pottington Road

31 October 2026
14:00

(1 BP) Exeter University	28 – 50	Old Redcliffians (1 BP)

Topsham Sports Ground

31 October 2026
14:15

(1 BP) Lymm	47 – 31	Hornets (1 BP)

Crouchley Lane

31 October 2026
14:30

Devonport Services	19 – 31	Luctonians (1 BP)

The Rectory

31 October 2026
15:00

(1 BP) Bournville	29 – 29	Loughborough Students (1 BP)

Avery Fields

31 October 2026
15:00

(1 BP) Redruth	8 – 15	Hinckley

Recreation Ground

31 October 2026
15:00

Taunton Titans	20 – 28	Cinderford (1 BP)

Summerfield Stadium

=== Round 9 ===
7 November 2026
14:00

(1 BP) Loughborough Students	54 – 26	Devonport Services (1 BP)

East Park

7 November 2026
14:00

(1 BP) Old Redcliffians	31 – 14	Taunton Titans

Scotland Lane

7 November 2026
14:15

(1 BP) Luctonians	53 – 7	Barnstaple

Mortimer Park

7 November 2026
15:00

Cinderford	22 – 16	Redruth (1 BP)

Bell Sports and Rugby Park

7 November 2026
15:00

(1 BP) Clifton	35 – 29	Exeter University (2 BP)

Station Road

7 November 2026
15:00

(1 BP) Hinckley	36 – 15	Lymm

Leicester Road

7 November 2026
15:00

(1 BP) Hornets	57 – 17	Bournville

The Nest

=== Round 10 ===
14 November 2026
14:00

Barnstaple	24 – 21	Loughborough Students (1 BP)

Pottington Road

14 November 2026
14:00

(1 BP) Exeter University	24 – 55	Luctonians (1 BP)

Topsham Sports Ground

14 November 2026
14:15

(1 BP) Lymm	26 – 30	Cinderford

Crouchley Lane

14 November 2026
14:30

(1 BP) Devonport Services	31 – 55	Bourneville (1 BP)

The Rectory

14 November 2026
15:00

(1 BP) Hinckley	46 – 33	Hornets (1 BP)

Leicester Road

14 November 2026
15:00

(1 BP) Redruth	40 – 20	Old Redcliffians (1 BP)

Recreation Ground

14 November 2026
15:00

(1 BP) Taunton	24 – 34	Clifton (1 BP)

Summerfield Stadium

=== Round 11 ===
20 November 2026
19:30

(1 BP) Loughborough Students	41 – 24	Exeter University (1 BP)

Rosslyn Park

21 November 2026
14:00

(1 BP) Old Redcliffians	52 – 0	Lymm

Scotland Lane

21 November 2026
14:15

(1 BP) Luctonians	33 – 26	Taunton Titans (2 BP)

Mortimer Park

21 November 2026
15:00

(2 BP) Bourneville	35 – 36	Barnstaple (1 BP)

Avery Fields

21 November 2026
15:00

(1 BP) Cinderford	24 – 31	Hinckley (1 BP)

Bell Sports and Rugby Park

21 November 2026
15:00

(1 BP) Clifton	26 – 24	Redruth (1 BP)

Station Road

21 November 2026
15:00

(1 BP) Hornets	57 – 32	Devonport Services (1 BP)

The Nest

== Individual statistics ==
- Does not include promotion/relegation play-offs.

=== Top points scorers ===
Rank	Player	Team	Points
1	Sam James	Redruth	20
2	Thomas Putt	Taunton Titans	18
3	Joseph Cummins	Redruth	16
4	Thomas Mclean	Old Redcliffians	15
4	Sebastian Rodriguez-Davies	Loughborough Students	15
4	Albert Stretch	Barnstaple	15
7	Thomas Quinlan	Clifton	13
7	Thomas Shard	Lymm	13
7	Cameron Johnson	Barnstaple	12
7	Owen Randell	Luctonians	12

=== Top try scorers ===
Rank	Player	Team	Tries
1	Sam James	Redruth	4
2	Thomas Mclean	Old Redcliffians	3
2	Sebastian Rodriguez-Davies	Loughborough Students	3
2	Albert Stretch	Barnstaple	3
5	Ten players		2

== See also ==
- 2026–27 Champ Rugby
- 2026–27 National League 1
- 2026–27 National League 2 East
- 2026–27 National League 2 North
