= 2025–26 National League 2 West =

Rugby union competition in England

- Countries: England
- Date: 5 September 2025 – 25 April 2026
- Champions: Camborne (1st title)
- Runners-up: Luctonians (not promoted)
- Relegated: Syston
- Matches played: 182
- Attendance: 88,772 (average 488 per match)
- Highest attendance: 2,942 – Camborne v Redruth, 13 September 2025
- Lowest attendance: 35 – Exe Uni v L Students, 14 February 2026
- Tries scored: 1696 (average 9.3 per match)
- Top point scorer: 284 – Thomas Putt (Taunton)
- Top try scorer: 39 – Ben Priddey (Camborne)

The 2025–26 National League 2 West is the fourth season of the fourth-tier (west) of the English domestic rugby union competitions; one of three at this level. The others are National League 2 East and National League 2 North.

Camborne, finished the season as champions on 18 April 2026 with two bonus points from a 34 – 41 defeat away to title challenger Luctonians, which was enough to take the league title with one round still to play. They achieved promotion to the 2026–27 National League 1 – at tier 3 the highest level the club has reached since the leagues began in 1987. Runner-up Luctonians played in the promotion-play-offs but lost 15 – 60 away to National League 1 side Birmingham Moseley on 9 May 2026 to remain in the division.

Syston were the first side to be relegated, on 21 March 2026 with three games still to play, following a 22 – 54 defeat away to Hornets, marking a return to level 5 after just one season. They were, initially joined on 25 April 2026 by the second relegated side Loughborough Students, but Loughborough were reprieved following Macclesfield's refusal to accept a level transfer to this league and were consequently relegated to Regional 1 North West. Exeter University beat Stourbridge (Regional 1 Midlands) 64 – 10 at home in the National 2 West Accession Final to remain in this division.

== Structure ==
The league consists of fourteen teams who play the others on a home and away basis, to make a total of 26 matches each. The champions are promoted to National League 1 while the runners-up go into a four team National 2 play-off with the runners-up from National League 2 North, National League 2 East and the 11th placed side in National League 1.

The bottom two teams are relegated to either Regional 1 Midlands or Regional 1 South West while the 12th placed side go into the four team Regional 1 play-off with the 12th placed sides from National 2 East and National 2 North, as well as the Regional 1 play-off winner.

The results of the matches contribute points to the league as follows:

- 4 points are awarded for a win
- 2 points are awarded for a draw
- 0 points are awarded for a loss, however
- 1 losing (bonus) point is awarded to a team that loses a match by 7 points or fewer
- 1 additional (bonus) point is awarded to a team scoring 4 tries or more in a match.

== Participating teams and locations ==
Ten of the fourteen teams participated in last season's competition, with the champions, Clifton promoted to National League 1. There was no relegation from National League 1 partly due to Champ Rugby increasing the number of teams from 12 to 14 and also the geographical location of the two relegated teams. Departing were Bournville (13th) and Devonport Services (14th), relegated to Regional 1 Midlands and Regional 1 South West respectively. Joining the league were Barnstaple, champions of Regional 1 South West, and Syston winners of Regional 1 Midlands. After one season Macclesfield (11th) were level transferred to National League 2 North, while both Lymm (3rd) and Chester (9th) joined from that league.

| Team | Ground | Capacity | City/Area | Previous season |
|---|---|---|---|---|
| Barnstaple | Pottington Road | 2,000 (575 seats) | Barnstaple, Devon | Promoted from Regional 1 South West |
| Camborne | Recreation Ground | 7,000 (780 seats) | Camborne, Cornwall | 2nd |
| Chester | Hare Lane | 2,000 (500 seats) | Chester, Cheshire | Level transfer from National League 2 North (9th) |
| Cinderford | Beavis Memorial Ground | 2,500 | Cinderford, Gloucestershire | 7th |
| Exeter University | Topsham Sports Ground (Note: Exeter University would also play one 'home' game at Millfield School in Street, Somerset.) | | Exeter, Devon | 12th |
| Hinckley | De Montfort Park | 2,000 | Hinckley, Leicestershire | 9th |
| Hornets | The Nest, Hutton Moor Park | 1,100 (100 stand) | Weston-super-Mare, Somerset | 6th |
| Loughborough Students | East Park (Note: Since relegation from the 2018–19 National League 1 Loughborough Students have switched games from the Loughborough University Stadium to nearby East Park.) | 1,000 | Loughborough, Leicestershire | 4th |
| Luctonians | Mortimer Park | 2,500 (300 seats) | Kingsland, Herefordshire | 5th |
| Lymm | Crouchley Lane | 1,000 | Lymm, Cheshire | Level transfer from National League 2 North (3rd) |
| Old Redcliffians | Scotland Lane | 1,000 | Brislington, Bristol | 10th |
| Redruth | Recreation Ground | 3,500 (580 seats) | Redruth, Cornwall | 8th |
| Syston | Barkby Road | | Queniborough, Leicestershire | Promoted from Regional 1 Midlands |
| Taunton Titans | Summerfield Stadium (Note: Formerly known as Veritas Park.) | 2,000 (198 seats) | Taunton, Somerset | 3rd |

Locations of the 2025–26 National League 2 West teams

== League table ==
2025–26 National League 2 West table
| Pos | Team | Pld | W | D | L | PF | PA | PD | TB | LB | Pts | Qualification |
|---|---|---|---|---|---|---|---|---|---|---|---|---|
| 1 | Camborne (C) | 26 | 22 | 0 | 4 | 1106 | 658 | +448 | 22 | 3 | 113 | Promotion place |
| 2 | Luctonians | 26 | 20 | 0 | 6 | 842 | 544 | +298 | 20 | 3 | 103 | Promotion play-off |
| 3 | Hinckley | 26 | 19 | 0 | 7 | 1002 | 722 | +280 | 23 | 2 | 101 | |
| 4 | Taunton Titans | 26 | 14 | 0 | 12 | 894 | 795 | +99 | 20 | 9 | 85 | |
| 5 | Cinderford | 26 | 13 | 0 | 13 | 779 | 765 | +14 | 18 | 6 | 76 | |
| 6 | Hornets | 26 | 14 | 0 | 12 | 759 | 756 | +3 | 17 | 2 | 75 | |
| 7 | Barnstaple | 26 | 13 | 1 | 12 | 734 | 777 | −43 | 19 | 1 | 74 | |
| 8 | Old Redcliffians | 26 | 12 | 0 | 14 | 775 | 778 | −3 | 18 | 7 | 73 | |
| 9 | Lymm | 26 | 12 | 0 | 14 | 726 | 812 | −86 | 15 | 3 | 66 | |
| 10 | Redruth | 26 | 10 | 1 | 15 | 721 | 760 | −39 | 17 | 7 | 66 | |
| 11 | Chester | 26 | 9 | 1 | 16 | 761 | 974 | −213 | 19 | 6 | 63 | |
| 12 | Exeter University | 26 | 10 | 0 | 16 | 857 | 957 | −100 | 17 | 1 | 58 | Relegation play-off |
| 13 | Loughborough Students | 26 | 8 | 1 | 17 | 837 | 1036 | −199 | 20 | 4 | 58 | Relegation place |
| 14 | Syston (R) | 26 | 4 | 0 | 22 | 608 | 1067 | −459 | 12 | 2 | 30 | Relegation place |

Updated to match(es) played on 25 April 2026. Source: National League Rugby
Rules for classification: If teams are level at any stage, tiebreakers are applied in the following order:
1. Number of matches won
2. Number of matches drawn
3. Difference between points for and against
4. Total number of points for
5. Aggregate number of points scored in matches between tied teams
6. Number of matches won excluding the first match, then the second and so on until the tie is settled

== Fixtures & results ==
=== Round 1 ===
5 September 2025
19:45

| (2 BP) Taunton Titans | 35 – 37 | Exeter University |

Summerfield Stadium
Attendance: 1,281
Referee: Haydn Davies

6 September 2025
14:30

| (1 BP) Barnstaple | 24 – 17 | Old Redcliffians (1 BP) |

Pottington Road
Attendance: 520
Referee: James Milliner-Woodcock

6 September 2025
14:30

| (1 BP) Chester | 25 – 45 | Camborne (1 BP) |

Hare Lane
Attendance: 450
Referee: Jack Sargentina

6 September 2025
15:00

| (1 BP) Cinderford | 48 – 19 | Syston |

Beavis Memorial Ground
Attendance: 350
Referee: Daniel Parrott

6 September 2025
15:00

| Hornets | 21 – 18 | Hinckley (1 BP) |

The Nest
Attendance: 538
Referee: Nathan Howarth

6 September 2025
15:00

| Luctonians | 13 – 24 | Lymm |

Mortimer Park
Attendance: 358
Referee: Peter Connor

6 September 2025
15:00

| (1 BP) Redruth | 36 – 31 | Loughborough Students (2 BP) |

Recreation Ground
Attendance: 685
Referee: Thomas Evans-Jones

=== Round 2 ===
13 September 2025
14:00

| (1 BP) Exeter University | 43 – 26 | Barnstaple (1 BP) |

Topsham Sport Ground
Attendance: 147
Referee: Thomas Evans-Jones

13 September 2025
14:30

| (1 BP) Camborne | 38 – 17 | Redruth |

Recreation Ground
Attendance: 2,942
Referee: Daniel Parrott

13 September 2025
14:30

| Lymm | 27 – 24 | Chester (2 BP) |

Crouchley Lane
Attendance: 252
Referee: George Ounsley

13 September 2025
15:00

| (1 BP) Hinckley | 38 – 26 | Loughborough Students (1 BP) |

De Montfort Park
Attendance: 502
Referee: Peter Connor

13 September 2025
15:00

| (1 BP) Hornets | 57 – 22 | Taunton Titans |

The Nest
Attendance: 612
Referee: James Walker

13 September 2025
15:00

| (2 BP) Old Redcliffians | 29 – 34 | Cinderford (1 BP) |

Scotland Lane
Attendance: 248 (Note: The Rugby Paper gave 2 attendances for Old Redcliffians home game against Cinderford on 13 September - 248 in the match report and 250 on the results page. The match report figure has been used.)
Referee: Nathan Howarth

13 September 2025
15:00

| (1 BP) Syston | 34 – 50 | Luctonians (1 BP) |

Barkby Road
Attendance: 252 (Note: The Rugby Paper gave 2 attendances for Syston's home game against Luctonians on 13 September - 252 in the match report and 250 on the results page. The match report figure has been used.)
Referee: Haydn Davies

=== Round 3 ===
20 September 2025
14:00

| Redruth | 26 – 22 | Lymm (1 BP) |

Recreation Ground
Attendance: 658
Referee: James Walker

20 September 2025
14:30

| (1 BP) Barnstaple | 40 – 17 | Hornets |

Pottingham Road
Attendance: 521 (Note: The Rugby Paper gave 2 attendances for Old Redcliffians home game against Cinderford on 13 September - 521 in the match report and 502 on the results page. The match report figure has been used.)
Referee: Adam Wookey

20 September 2025
14:30

| Loughborough Students | 14 – 43 | Camborne (1 BP) |

East Park
Attendance: 576
Referee: Peter Buchanan

20 September 2025
15:00

| Chester | 20 – 7 | Syston |

Hare Lane
Attendance: 275
Referee: Daniel Woods

20 September 2025
15:00

| (1 BP) Cinderford | 25 – 12 | Exeter University |

Beavis Memorial Ground
Attendance: 325
Referee: Haydn Davies

20 September 2025
15:00

| (1 BP) Luctonians | 35 – 7 | Old Redcliffians |

Mortimer Park
Attendance: 345
Referee: Daniel Parrott

20 September 2025
15:00

| (1 BP) Taunton Titans | 41 – 26 | Hinckley (1 BP) |

Summerfield Stadium
Attendance: 597
Referee: James Milliner-Woodcock

=== Round 4 ===
27 September 2025
14:00

| Exeter University | 19 – 38 | Luctonians (1 BP) |

Topsham Sports Ground
Attendance: 278 (Note: The Rugby Paper gave 2 attendances for Exeter University's home game against Luctonians on 27 September - 400 in the match report and 278 on the results page. The results figure has been given as it appears to be more specific.)
Referee: James Milliner-Woodcock

27 September 2025
14:30

| (1 BP) Lymm | 52 – 35 | Loughborough Students (1 BP) |

Crouchley Lane
Attendance: 250
Referee: Mark Hyde

27 September 2025
15:00

| Hinckley | 24 – 34 | Camborne (1 BP) |

De Montfort Park
Attendance: 312 (Note: The Rugby Paper gave 2 attendances for Hinckley's home game against Camborne on 27 September - 300 in the match report and 312 on the results page. The results figure has been given as it appears to be more specific.)
Referee: Not recorded (Note: The Rugby Paper failed to record who was referring the Hinckley versus Camborne game on 27 September 2025.)

27 September 2025
15:00

| (1 BP) Hornets | 33 – 24 | Cinderford (1 BP) |

The Nest
Attendance: 512
Referee: Thomas Evans-Jones

27 September 2025
15:00

| (1 BP) Old Redcliffians | 52 – 21 | Chester |

Scotland Lane
Attendance: 450
Referee: William Foster

27 September 2025
15:00

| Syston | 24 – 35 | Redruth (1 BP) |

Barkby Road
Attendance: 276 (Note: The Rugby Paper gave 2 attendances for Syston's home game against Redruth on 27 September - 250 in the match report and 276 on the results page. The results figure has been given as it appears to be more specific.)
Referee: Nathan Howarth

27 September 2025
15:00

| (2 BP) Taunton Titans | 34 – 41 | Barnstaple (1 BP) |

Summerfield Stadium
Attendance: 416
Referee: Daniel Parrott

=== Round 5 ===
4 October 2025
14:00

| (1 BP) Camborne | 43 – 31 | Lymm (1 BP) |

Recreation Ground
Attendance: 657
Referee: James Milliner-Woodcock

4 October 2025
14:00

| (1 BP) Loughborough Students | 40 – 14 | Syston |

East Park
Attendance: 376
Referee: James Walker

4 October 2025
14:30

| (1 BP) Barnstaple | 52 – 29 | Hinckley (1 BP) |

Pottingham Road
Attendance: 500
Referee: Nathan Howarth

4 October 2025
15:00

| (1 BP) Chester | 71 – 19 | Exeter University |

Hare Lane
Attendance: 525
Referee: Thomas Hurdley

4 October 2025
15:00

| Cinderford | 21 – 34 | Taunton Titans (1 BP) |

Beavis Memorial Ground
Attendance: 320
Referee: Daniel Parrott

4 October 2025
15:00

| (1 BP) Luctonians | 38 – 29 | Hornets (1 BP) |

Mortimer Park
Attendance: 685
Referee: Haydn Davies

4 October 2025
15:00

| (1 BP) Redruth | 29 – 7 | Old Redcliffians |

Recreation Ground
Attendance: 660
Referee: Peter Buchanan

=== Round 6 ===
11 October 2025
14:00

| (1 BP) Exeter University | 46 – 40 | Redruth (2 BP) |

Topsham Sport Ground
Attendance: 191
Referee: Thomas Evans-Jones

11 October 2025
14:30

| (1 BP) Barnstaple | 25 – 23 | Cinderford (1 BP) |

Pottington Road
Attendance: 301
Referee: James Milliner-Woodcock

11 October 2025
15:00

| (1 BP) Hinckley | 39 – 22 | Lymm |

Leicester Road
Attendance: 850
Referee: James Walker

11 October 2025
15:00

| (1 BP) Hornets | 48 – 17 | Chester |

The Nest
Attendance: 512
Referee: Adam Wookey

11 October 2025
15:00

| (1 BP) Old Redcliffians | 47 – 19 | Loughborough Students |

Scotland Lane
Attendance: 450
Referee: Simon Waite

11 October 2025
15:00

| (1 BP) Syston | 40 – 69 | Camborne (1 BP) |

Barkby Road
Attendance: 398
Referee: Connor Boyle

11 October 2025
15:00

| (1 BP) Taunton Titans | 24 – 29 | Luctonians (1 BP) |

Summerfield Stadium
Attendance: 471
Referee: Nathan Howarth

=== Round 7 ===
18 October 2025
14:00

| (1 BP) Loughborough Students | 42 – 39 | Exeter University (2 BP) |

East Park
Attendance: 478
Referee: Max Marshall

18 October 2025
14:30

| (1 BP) Camborne | 41 – 12 | Old Redcliffians |

Recreation Ground
Attendance: 743
Referee: Adam Wookey

18 October 2025
14:30

| (1 BP) Lymm | 52 – 36 | Syston (1 BP) |

Crouchley Lane
Attendance: 238
Referee: Daniel Woods

18 October 2025
15:00

| (1 BP) Chester | 38 – 33 | Taunton Titans (2 BP) |

Hare Lane
Attendance: 347
Referee: Peter Connor

18 October 2025
15:00

| (1 BP) Cinderford | 43 – 40 | Hinckley (2 BP) |

Beavis Memorial Ground
Attendance: 350
Referee: Haydn Davies

18 October 2025
15:00

| (1 BP) Luctonians | 28 – 10 | Barnstaple |

Mortimer Park
Attendance: 724
Referee: Daniel Parrott

18 October 2025
15:00

| (1 BP) Redruth | 26 – 0 | Hornets |

Recreation Ground
Attendance: 700
Referee: James Milliner-Woodcock

=== Round 8 ===
25 October 2025
14:00

| (1 BP) Exeter University | 26 – 43 | Camborne (1 BP) |

Topsham Sport Ground
Attendance: 202
Referee: James Walker

25 October 2025
14:30

| (1 BP) Barnstaple | 28 – 21 | Chester (1 BP) |

Pottington Road
Attendance: 280
Referee: Haydn Davies

25 October 2025
15:00

| Cinderford | 10 – 35 | Luctonians (1 BP) |

Beavis Memorial Ground
Attendance: 350
Referee: Matthew Arrowsmith

25 October 2025
15:00

| (1 BP) Hinckley | 37 – 28 | Syston (1 BP) |

Leicester Road
Attendance: 1,150
Referee: Simon Waite

25 October 2025
15:00

| (1 BP) Hornets | 35 – 14 | Loughborough Students |

The Nest
Attendance: 901
Referee: Harry Parsons

25 October 2025
15:00

| (2 BP) Old Redcliffians | 26 – 29 | Lymm (1 BP) |

Scotland Road
Attendance: 285
Referee: Peter Connor

25 October 2025
15:30

| (1 BP) Taunton Titans | 44 – 15 | Redruth |

Summerfield Stadium
Attendance: 970
Referee: Mark Hyde

=== Round 9 ===
8 November 2025
14:00

| (1 BP) Camborne | 43 – 18 | Hornets |

Recreation Ground
Attendance: 818
Referee: Haydn Davies

8 November 2025
14:00

| (1 BP) Loughborough Students | 31 – 24 | Taunton Titans (2 BP) |

East Park
Attendance: 252
Referee: Nathan Howarth

8 November 2025
14:00

| Syston | 7 – 30 | Old Redcliffians (1 BP) |

Barkby Road
Attendance: 325
Referee: Jack Sargentia

8 November 2025
14:15

| (2 BP) Luctonians | 22 – 26 | Hinckley (1 BP) |

Mortimer Park
Attendance: 411
Referee: James Walker

8 November 2025
14:30

| (1 BP) Lymm | 48 – 40 | Exeter University (1 BP) |

Crouchley Lane
Attendance: 303
Referee: Daniel Woods

8 November 2025
15:00

| (1 BP) Chester | 46 – 37 | Cinderford (1 BP) |

Hare Lane
Attendance: 350
Referee: Simon Waite

8 November 2025
15:00

| (2 BP) Redruth | 26 – 27 | Barnstaple (1 BP) |

Recreation Ground
Attendance: 635
Referee: Haydn Davies

=== Round 10 ===
15 November 2025
14:00

| (1 BP) Barnstaple | 36 – 33 | Loughborough Students (2 BP) |

Pottingham Road
Attendance: 311
Referee: James Walker

15 November 2025
14:00

| (1 BP) Exeter University | 79 – 36 | Syston (1 BP) |

Topsham Sports Ground
Attendance: 303
Referee: James Milliner-Woodcock

15 November 2025
14:15

| (1 BP) Luctonians | 42 – 0 | Chester |

Mortimer Park
Attendance: 487
Referee: Mark Hyde

15 November 2025
15:00

| (1 BP) Cinderford | 32 – 22 | Redruth |

Beavis Memorial Ground
Attendance: 295
Referee: Peter Connor

15 November 2025
15:00

| (1 BP) Hinckley | 36 – 19 | Old Redcliffians |

Leicester Road
Attendance: 825
Referee: Nathan Howarth

15 November 2025
15:00

| (1 BP) Hornets | 27 – 19 | Lymm |

The Nest
Attendance: 400
Referee: Thomas Hurdley

15 November 2025
15:00

| Taunton Titans | 30 – 29 | Camborne (1 BP) |

Summerfield Stadium
Attendance: 842
Referee: Haydn Davies

=== Round 11 ===
22 November 2025
14:00

| (1 BP) Camborne | 34 – 22 | Barnstaple (1 BP) |

Recreation Ground
Attendance: 784
Referee: James Milliner-Woodcock

22 November 2025
14:00

| Loughborough Students | 17 – 38 | Cinderford (1 BP) |

East Park
Attendance: 422
Referee: Daniel Parrott

22 November 2025
14:00

| (1 BP) Old Redcliffians | 29 – 20 | Exeter University |

Scotland Lane
Attendance: 233 (Note: The Rugby Paper gave 625 for the attendance between Old Redcliffians v Exeter University on 22 November 2025 which seems to be high. This is likely a printing mistake as Redruth v Luctonians was given as 233 while a Redruth official confirmed it was actually 635. Will use the 233 figure until further notice.)
Referee: James Walker

22 November 2025
14:00

| (1 BP) Syston | 34 – 28 | Hornets (2 BP) |

Barkby Road
Attendance: 156
Referee: Peter Connor

22 November 2025
14:30

| (1 BP) Lymm | 39 – 33 | Taunton Titans (2 BP) |

Crouchley Lane
Attendance: 299 (Note: The Rugby Paper gave 2 attendance figures for Lymm v Taunton on 22 November 2025 - 299 on the match report and 300 on the results page. The match report figure has been used.)
Referee: Michael Harris

22 November 2025
15:00

| (1 BP) Chester | 26 – 55 | Hinckley (1 BP) |

Hare Lane
Attendance: 250
Referee: Lloyd Davies

22 November 2025
15:00

| Redruth | 19 – 54 | Luctonians (1 BP) |

Recreation Ground
Attendance: 635 (Note: The Rugby Paper gave an attendance of just 233 for Redruth v Luctonians on 22 November 2025 which appears to be very low. The figure given by Redruth was 635 which will be used.)
Referee: Thomas Evans-Jones

=== Round 12 ===
6 December 2025
14:00

| Barnstaple | 19 – 12 | Lymm (1 BP) |

Pottingham Road
Attendance: 876
Referee: Thomas Evans-Jones

6 December 2025
14:00

| (1 BP) Chester | 39 – 28 | Redruth (1 BP) |

Hare Lane
Attendance: 382
Referee: Thomas Hurdley

6 December 2025
14:15

| (1 BP) Luctonians | 26 – 17 | Loughborough Students |

Mortimer Park
Attendance: 468
Referee: Lloyd Davies

6 December 2025
15:00

| (1 BP) Cinderford | 14 – 19 | Camborne |

Beavis Memorial Ground
Attendance: 399 (Note: The Rugby Paper gave two attendances for Cinderford v Camborne on 6 December 2025 - 399 on the match report and 400 on the results page. The match report figure has been used as it is more specific.)
Referee: Daniel Parrott

6 December 2025
15:00

| (1 BP) Hinckley | 24 – 13 | Exeter University |

Leicester Road
Attendance: 950
Referee: Peter Connor

6 December 2025
15:00

| Hornets | 18 – 15 | Old Redcliffians (1 BP) |

The Nest
Attendance: 764
Referee: James Milliner-Woodcock

6 December 2025
15:00

| (1 BP) Taunton Titans | 51 – 28 | Syston (1 BP) |

Summerfield Stadium
Attendance: 660
Referee: Ben Simpson

=== Round 13 ===
13 December 2025
14:00

| (1 BP) Camborne | 29 – 15 | Luctonians |

Recreation Ground
Attendance: 912
Referee: Adam Wookey

13 December 2025
14:00

| (1 BP) Exeter University | 38 – 54 | Hornets (1 BP) |

Topsham Sports Ground
Attendance: 215
Referee: Haydn Davies

13 December 2025
14:00

| (1 BP) Loughborough Students | 28 – 28 | Chester (1 BP) |

East Park
Attendance: 126
Referee: Peter Connor

13 December 2025
14:00

| (1 BP) Old Redcliffians | 28 – 26 | Taunton Titans (2 BP) |

Scotland Lane
Attendance: 301
Referee: Daniel Parrott

13 December 2025
14:00

| (1 BP) Syston | 39 – 17 | Barnstaple |

Barkby Road
Attendance: 408
Referee: James Walker

13 December 2025
14:30

| (1 BP) Lymm | 33 – 43 | Cinderford (1 BP) |

Crouchley Lane
Attendance: 250
Referee: Andrew Shaw

13 December 2025
15:00

| (1 BP) Redruth | 27 – 10 | Hinckley |

Recreation Ground
Attendance: 500
Referee: James Milliner-Woodcock

=== Round 14 ===
20 December 2025
14:00

| (1 BP) Barnstaple | 34 – 22 | Exeter University (1 BP) |

Pottingham Road
Attendance: 301
Referee: Daniel Parrott

20 December 2025
14:00

| (1 BP) Loughborough Students | 33 – 57 | Hinckley (1 BP) |

East Park
Attendance: 110
Referee: Lloyd Davies

20 December 2025
14:15

| (1 BP) Luctonians | 35 – 7 | Syston |

Mortimer Park
Attendance: 897
Referee: Jack Sargentina

20 December 2025
15:00

| (1 BP) Chester | 44 – 29 | Lymm (1 BP) |

Hare Lane
Attendance: 400
Referee: Nathan Howard

20 December 2025
15:00

| (1 BP) Cinderford | 33 – 20 | Old Redcliffians |

Beavis Memorial Ground
Attendance: 475
Referee: James Walker

20 December 2025
15:00

| Redruth | 18 – 28 | Camborne |

Recreation Ground
Attendance: 2,548
Referee: Tom Evans-Jones

20 December 2025
15:00

| (1 BP) Taunton Titans | 29 – 21 | Hornets |

Summerfield Stadium
Attendance: 1,002
Referee: James Milliner-Woodcock

=== Round 15 ===
10 January 2026
14:00

| (1 BP) Camborne | 74 – 38 | Loughborough Students (1 BP) |

Recreation Ground
Attendance: 500
Referee: James Milliner-Woodcock

10 January 2026
14:00

| (1 BP) Exeter University | 54 – 12 | Cinderford |

Topsham Sports Ground
Attendance: 102
Referee: Daniel Parrott

10 January 2026
14:00

| (1 BP) Lymm | 36 – 31 | Redruth (2 BP) |

Crouchley Lane
Attendance: 145
Referee: Owen Taylor

10 January 2026
14:00

| (1 BP) Old Redcliffians | 29 – 40 | Luctonians (1 BP) |

Scotland Lane
Attendance: 349 (Note: The Rugby Paper gave two attendances for Old Redcliffians v Luctonians on 10 January 2026 - 349 on the match report and 350 on the results page. The match report figure has been used as it is more specific.)
Referee: Peter Connor

10 January 2026
14:00

| (1 BP) Syston | 21 – 26 | Chester (1 BP) |

Barkby Road
Attendance: 256
Referee: Nathan Howarth

10 January 2026
15:00

| Hinckley | P – P | Taunton Titans |

Leicester Road

- Postponed due to frozen pitch. Game to be rescheduled for 7 February 2026.

10 January 2026
15:00

| (1 BP) Hornets | 41 – 24 | Barnstaple (1 BP) |

The Nest
Attendance: 202
Referee: Haydn Davis

=== Round 16 ===
17 January 2026
14:00

| (2 BP) Barnstaple | 24 – 31 | Taunton Titans (1 BP) |

Pottingham Road
Attendance: 679
Referee: James Milliner-Woodcock

17 January 2026
14:00

| (1 BP) Camborne | 36 – 26 | Hinckley (1 BP) |

Recreation Ground
Attendance: 795
Referee: Lloyd Davies

17 January 2026
14:00

| (1 BP) Loughborough Students | 38 – 24 | Lymm (1 BP) |

East Park
Attendance: 243
Referee: Mark Hyde

17 January 2026
14:15

| (1 BP) Luctonians | 40 – 31 | Exeter University (1 BP) |

Mortimer Park
Attendance: 437
Referee: Adam Wookey

17 January 2026
15:00

| (2 BP) Chester | 29 – 36 | Old Redcliffians (1 BP) |

Hare Lane
Attendance: 301
Referee: (Note: The Rugby Paper did not provide details of the referee for the Chester v Old Redcliffians fixture on 17 January 2026.)

17 January 2026
14:00

| (1 BP) Cinderford | 29 – 7 | Hornets |

Beavis Memorial Ground
Attendance: 425
Referee: Tom Evans-Jones

17 January 2026
15:00

| (1 BP) Redruth | 33 – 5 | Syston |

Recreation Ground
Attendance: 650
Referee: James Walker

=== Round 17 ===
24 January 2026
14:00

| (1 BP) Exeter University | 42 – 12 | Chester |

Topsham Sports Ground
Attendance: 122
Referee: Tom Evans-Jones

24 January 2026
14:00

| (1 BP) Lymm | 24 – 34 | Camborne (1 BP) |

Crouchley Lane
Attendance: 221
Referee: Ben Rayner

24 January 2026
14:00

| (1 BP) Old Redcliffians | 31 – 24 | Redruth (2 BP) |

Scotland Lane
Attendance: 250
Referee: Haydn Davies

24 January 2026
14:00

| (1 BP) Syston | 22 – 15 | Loughborough Students (1 BP) |

Barkby Road
Attendance: 381
Referee: Daniel Parrott

24 January 2026
15:00

| (1 BP) Hinckley | 41 – 31 | Barnstaple (1 BP) |

Leicester Road
Attendance: 850
Referee: Peter Connor

24 January 2026
15:00

| (1 BP) Hornets | 12 –14 | Luctonians |

The Nest
Attendance: 228
Referee: James Milliner-Woodcock

24 January 2026
15:00

| Taunton Titans | 16 – 14 | Cinderford (1 BP) |

Summerfield Stadium
Attendance: 738
Referee: James Walker

=== Round 18 ===
30 January 2026
19:30

| Redruth | P – P | Exeter University |

Recreation Ground

- Postponed due to waterlogged pitch. Game to be rescheduled for 7 February 2026.

31 January 2026
14:00

| (1 BP) Camborne | 59 – 19 | Syston |

Recreation Ground
Attendance: 701
Referee: Tom Evans-Jones

31 January 2026
14:00

| (2 BP) Loughborough Students | 49 – 50 | Old Redcliffians (1 BP) |

East Park
Attendance: 143
Referee: Peter Connor

31 January 2026
14:15

| (1 BP) Luctonians | 26 – 19 | Taunton Titans (1 BP) |

Mortimer Park
Attendance: 443
Referee: Lloyd Davies

31 January 2026
14:30

| Lymm | 21 – 48 | Hinckley (1 BP) |

Crouchley Lane
Attendance: 280
Referee: Jack Moorhouse

31 January 2026
15:00

| (2 BP) Chester | 26 – 27 | Hornets (1 BP) |

Hare Lane
Attendance: 250
Referee: Daniel Parrott

31 January 2026
15:00

| (1 BP) Cinderford | 41 – 24 | Barnstaple (1 BP) |

Beavis Memorial Ground
Attendance: 425
Referee: Nathan Howarth

=== Rounds 15 & 18 (rescheduled games) ===
7 February 2026
14:00

| Hinckley | P – P | Taunton Titans |

Leicester Road

- Game rescheduled from 10 January 2026 but postponed again due to waterlogged pitch. Game to be rescheduled for 7 March 2026.

7 February 2026
14:30

| (1 BP) Redruth | 30 – 14 | Exeter University |

Recreation Ground
Attendance: 600 (Note: The Rugby Paper reported the attendance of Redruth v Exeter University on 7 February 2026 to be just 350, while Redruth club officials confirm the actual attendance to be 530.)
Referee: James Milliner-Woodcock

- Game rescheduled from 30 January 2026.

=== Round 19 ===
14 February 2026
14:00

| Barnstaple | 24 – 23 | Luctonians (1 BP) |

Pottington Road
Attendance: 449 (Note: The Rugby Paper gave 2 attendances for Barnstaple v Luctonians on 14 February 2026, 449 on the match report and 450 on the results page. The match report figure has been used.)
Referee: Haydn Davies

14 February 2026
14:00

| (1 BP) Exeter University | 36 – 28 | Loughborough Students (1 BP) |

Millfield School, Street
Attendance: 35
Referee: Tom Evans-Jones

14 February 2026
14:00

| (1 BP) Old Redcliffians | 28 – 59 | Camborne (1 BP) |

Scotland Lane
Attendance: 624 (Note: Attendance of 624 looks very high for Old Redcliffians v Camborne on 14 February 2026. Confirmation needed from RFU.)
Referee: James Walker

14 February 2026
14:00

| (1 BP) Syston | 14 – 19 | Lymm |

Barkby Road
Attendance: 181
Referee: Peter Connor

14 February 2026
15:00

| (1 BP) Hinckley | 37 – 31 | Cinderford (2 BP) |

Leicester Road
Attendance: 299 (Note: The Rugby Paper gave 2 attendances for Hinckley v Cinderford on 14 February 2026, 299 on the match report and 300 on the results page. The match report figure has been used.)
Referee: Daniel Parrott

14 February 2026
15:00

| (1 BP) Hornets | 38 – 31 | Redruth (2 BP) |

The Nest
Attendance: 311
Referee: Mark Hyde

14 February 2026
15:00

| (1 BP) Taunton Titans | 61 – 14 | Chester |

Summerfield Stadium
Attendance: 510
Referee: James Milliner-Woodcock

=== Round 20 ===
21 February 2026
14:00

| (1 BP) Chester | 27 – 19 | Barnstaple |

Hare Lane
Attendance: 300
Referee: Nathan Howarth

21 February 2026
14:00

| (1 BP) Loughborough Students | 45 – 35 | Hornets (1 BP) |

East Park
Attendance: 183
Referee: Simon Waite

21 February 2026
14:00

| Syston | 12 – 51 | Hinckley (1 BP) |

Barkby Road
Attendance: 409
Referee: James Walker

21 February 2026
14:15

| Luctonians | 15 – 11 | Cinderford (1 BP) |

Mortimer Park
Attendance: 497
Referee: Peter Connor

21 February 2026
14:30

| (1 BP) Camborne | 52 – 12 | Exeter University |

Recreation Ground
Attendance: 545
Referee: James Milliner-Woodcock

21 February 2026
14:30

| Lymm | 7 – 25 | Old Redcliffians |

Crouchley Lane
Attendance: 500
Referee: Matthew Arrowsmith

21 February 2026
15:00

| (1 BP) Redruth | 18 – 20 | Taunton Titans |

Recreation Ground
Attendance: 715 (Note: The Rugby Paper listed the attendance for the Redruth v Taunton Titans game on 22 February 2026 as being 501. Redruth club officials confirm the real attendance was 715.)
Referee: Haydn Davies

=== Round 21 ===
28 February 2026
14:00

| Barnstaple | 21 – 21 | Redruth |

Pottington Road
Attendance: 301 (Note: The Rugby Paper gave 2 attendances for Barnstaple v Redruth on 28 February 2026 - 301 in the match report & 380 in the results page. The match report figure has been used until further notice.)
Referee: Tom Evans-Jones

28 February 2026
14:00

| (1 BP) Exeter University | 33 – 42 | Lymm (1 BP) |

Topsham Sport Ground
Attendance: 101
Referee: Haydn Davies

28 February 2026
14:00

| (2 BP) Old Redcliffians | 31 – 38 | Syston (1 BP) |

Scotland Lane
Attendance: 138
Referee: James Milliner-Woodcock

28 February 2026
15:00

| (1 BP) Cinderford | 47 – 40 | Chester (2 BP) |

Beavis Memorial Ground
Attendance: 380
Referee: Callum Watson

28 February 2026
15:00

| (1 BP) Hinckley | 36 – 0 | Luctonians |

Leicester Road
Attendance: 675
Referee: Mark Hyde

28 February 2026
15:00

| (1 BP) Hornets | 40 – 17 | Camborne |

The Nest
Attendance: 462
Referee: Peter Connor

28 February 2026
15:00

| (1 BP) Taunton Titans | 56 – 29 | Loughborough Students (1 BP) |

Summerfield Stadium
Attendance: 723
Referee: Adam Wookey

=== Round 15 (rescheduled game) ===
7 March 2026
14:00

| (1 BP) Hinckley | 47 – 33 | Taunton Titans (1 BP) |

Leicester Road
Attendance: 475
Referee: Mark Hyde

- Game rescheduled from 7 February 2026.

=== Round 22 ===
14 March 2026
14:00

| (1 BP) Loughborough Students | 54 – 40 | Barnstaple (1 BP) |

East Park
Attendance: 230
Referee: Mark Hyde

14 March 2026
14:00

| (2 BP) Old Redcliffians | 27 – 33 | Hinckley (1 BP) |

Scotland Lane
Attendance: 398 (Note: The Rugby Paper gave 2 attendances for Old Redcliffians v Hinckley on 14 March 2026 - 398 in the match report & 400 in the results page. The match report figure has been used.)
Referee: Tom Evans-Jones

14 March 2026
14:30

| (2 BP) Camborne | 31 – 38 | Taunton Titans (1 BP) |

Recreation Ground
Attendance: 916
Referee: James Walker

14 March 2026
14:30

| (2 BP) Lymm | 26 – 32 | Hornets (1 BP) |

Crouchley Lane
Attendance: 350
Referee: Peter Connor

14 March 2026
15:00

| (1 BP) Chester | 28 – 55 | Luctonians (1 BP) |

Hare Lane
Attendance: 350
Referee: Andrew Shaw

14 March 2026
15:00

| (1 BP) Redruth | 31 – 19 | Cinderford |

Recreation Ground
Attendance: 650 (Note: The Rugby Paper listed the attendance for the Redruth v Cinderford game on 14 March 2026 as being just 450. Redruth club officials confirm the actual attendance was 650.)
Referee: James Milliner-Woodcock

14 March 2026
15:00

| Syston | 14 – 22 | Exeter University |

Barkby Road
Attendance: 479
Referee: Lloyd Davies

=== Round 23 ===
21 March 2026
14:00

| (1 BP) Barnstaple | 24 – 54 | Camborne (1 BP) |

Pottingham Road
Attendance: 339 (Note: The Rugby Paper listed 2 attendances for Barnstaple v Camborne on 21 March 2026 - 339 in the match report and 269 on the results page. The match report figure has been used.)
Referee: Daniel Parrott

21 March 2026
14:00

| (1 BP) Exeter University | 47 – 57 | Old Redcliffians (1 BP) |

Topsham Sport Ground
Attendance: 121
Referee: James Milliner-Woodcock

21 March 2026
15:00

| (1 BP) Cinderford | 50 – 57 | Loughborough Students (1 BP) |

Beavis Memorial Ground
Attendance: 380
Referee: Lloyd Davies

21 March 2026
15:00

| (1 BP) Hinckley | 36 – 33 | Chester (2 BP) |

Leicester Road
Attendance: 315
Referee: James Walker

21 March 2026
15:00

| (1 BP) Hornets | 54 – 22 | Syston |

The Nest
Attendance: 180
Referee: Ollie Parsons

- Syston are relegated.

21 March 2026
15:00

| (1 BP) Luctonians | 52 – 7 | Redruth |

Mortimer Park
Attendance: 557
Referee: Nathan Howarth

21 March 2026
15:00

| (2 BP) Taunton Titans | 28 – 29 | Lymm (1 BP) |

Summerfield Stadium
Attendance: 839
Referee: Harry Parsons

=== Round 24 ===
11 April 2026
14:00

| (1 BP) Exeter University | 31 – 77 | Hinckley (1 BP) |

Topsham Sports Ground
Attendance: 68
Referee: Daniel Parrott

11 April 2026
14:00

| (1 BP) Loughborough Students | 26 – 47 | Luctonians (1 BP) |

East Park
Attendance: 130
Referee: Peter Connor

11 April 2026
14:00

| (1 BP) Redruth | 55 – 28 | Chester (1 BP) |

Recreation Ground
Attendance: 885 (Note: The Rugby Paper reported an attendance of just 400 for Redruth v Chester on 11 April 2026. Redruth club officials provided the real figure of 885.)
Referee: Haydn Davies

11 April 2026
14:30

| (1 BP) Camborne | 52 – 31 | Cinderford (1 BP) |

Recreation Ground
Attendance: 843
Referee: Tom Evans-Jones

11 April 2026
14:30

| Lymm | 10 – 26 | Barnstaple (1 BP) |

Crouchley Lane
Attendance: 220
Referee: James Walker

11 April 2026
15:00

| (1 BP) Old Redcliffians | 45 – 19 | Hornets |

Scotland Lane
Attendance: 500
Referee: Mark Hyde

11 April 2026
15:00

| (1 BP) Syston | 43 – 66 | Taunton Titans (1 BP) |

Barkby Road
Attendance: 230
Referee: Nathan Howarth

=== Round 25 ===
18 April 2026
14:30

| (1 BP) Barnstaple | 57 – 14 | Syston |

Pottingham Road
Attendance: 967
Referee: James Milliner-Woodcock

18 April 2026
15:00

| (1 BP) Chester | 47 – 31 | Loughborough Students (1 BP) |

Hare Lane
Attendance: 399 (Note: The Rugby Paper listed 2 attendances for Chester v Loughborough Students on 18 April 2026 - 399 on the match report and 400 on the results page. The match report figure has been used.)
Referee: George Ounsley

18 April 2026
15:00

| (1 BP) Cinderford | 26 – 17 | Lymm |

Beavis Memorial Ground
Attendance: 349 (Note: The Rugby Paper listed 2 attendances for Cinderford v Lymm on 18 April 2026 - 349 on the match report and 350 on the results page. The match report figure has been used.)
Referee: Max Marshall

18 April 2026
15:00

| (1 BP) Hinckley | 47 – 36 | Redruth (1 BP) |

Leicester Road
Attendance: 650
Referee: Alexander Rose

18 April 2026
15:00

| (1 BP) Hornets | 24 – 36 | Exeter University (1 BP) |

The Nest
Attendance: 259
Referee: James Walker

18 April 2026
15:00

| (1 BP) Luctonians | 41 – 34 | Camborne (2 BP) |

Mortimer Park
Attendance: 1,134
Referee: Lloyd Davies

- Camborne are champions.

18 April 2026
15:00

| (1 BP) Taunton Titans | 42 – 36 | Old Redcliffians (2 BP) |

Summerfield Stadium
Attendance: 1,010
Referee: Matthew Arrowsmith

=== Round 26 ===
25 April 2026
15:00

| (1 BP) Camborne | 66 – 31 | Chester (1 BP) |

Recreation Ground
Attendance: 1,482
Referee: James Walker

25 April 2026
15:00

| (1 BP) Exeter University | 44 – 24 | Taunton Titans (1 BP) |

Topsham Sports Ground
Attendance: 320
Referee: Tom Evans-Jones

25 April 2026
15:00

| (1 BP) Hinckley | 64 – 24 | Hornets (1 BP) |

Leicester Road
Attendance: 750
Referee: Lloyd Davies

25 April 2026
15:00

| (1 BP) Loughborough Students | 47 – 40 | Redruth (2 BP) |

East Park
Attendance: 370
Referee: Nathan Howarth

- Loughborough Students are relegated.

25 April 2026
15:00

| (1 BP) Lymm | 32 – 29 | Luctonians (2 BP) |

Crouchley Lane
Attendance: 292
Referee: Matthew Arrowsmith

25 April 2026
15:00

| (1 BP) Old Redcliffians | 42 – 19 | Barnstaple |

Scotland Lane
Attendance: 255
Referee: Mark Hyde

25 April 2026
15:00

| (1 BP) Syston | 31 – 43 | Cinderford (1 BP) |

Barkby Road
Attendance: 274
Referee: Peter Connor

== Play-offs ==
=== National 2 promotion play-offs ===
The club finishing 11th in National League 1 contested a play-off against one of the second-placed teams from National League 2 East, National League 2 North or National League 2 West, with the National 1 club playing the National 2 club with the poorest league record; the other two National League 2 clubs playing each other. Home advantage was given to the team from the higher league and the team with the better league record.

9th May 2026
15:00

| Birmingham Moseley (N1) | 60 – 15 | Luctonians (N2W) |

Billesley Common
Attendance: 1,192
Referee: George Ounsley

9th May 2026
15:00

| Tynedale (N2N) | 20 – 29 | Oundle (N2E) |

Tynedale Park
Attendance: 820
Referee: Samuel Yates

=== National 1 Accession Final ===
The winners of the National 2 promotion play-offs faced one another to decide who would be the final side to be play in the 2026–27 National League 1.

16th May 2026
15:00

| Birmingham Moseley (N1) | 19 – 15 | Oundle (N2E) |

Billesley Common
Attendance: 1,113
Referee: Ben Simpson

- Birmingham Moseley remain in National League 1.

=== National League 2 West Accession Final ===
The winner of the Regional 1 Midlands and Regional 1 South West promotion play-off met 12th placed Exeter University to decide who would be the final side to play in the 2026–27 National League 2 West.

9th May 2026
15:00

| Exeter University (N2W) | 64–10 | Stourbridge (R1M) |

Topsham Sports Ground
Attendance: 600
Referee: Rebecca Piddlestone

- Exeter University remain in the division.

== Attendances ==
- Does not include promotion/relegation play-offs.

| Club | Home Games | Total | Average | Highest | Lowest | % Capacity |
|---|---|---|---|---|---|---|
| Barnstaple | 13 | 6,345 | 488 | 967 | 280 | 24% |
| Camborne | 13 | 12,638 | 972 | 2,942 | 500 | 14% |
| Chester | 13 | 4,579 | 352 | 525 | 250 | 18% |
| Cinderford | 13 | 4,823 | 371 | 475 | 295 | 15% |
| Exeter University | 13 | 2,205 | 170 | 320 | 35 | N/A |
| Hinckley | 13 | 8,603 | 662 | 1,150 | 299 | 33% |
| Hornets | 13 | 5,881 | 452 | 901 | 180 | 41% |
| Loughborough Students | 13 | 3,639 | 280 | 576 | 110 | 28% |
| Luctonians | 13 | 7,443 | 573 | 1,134 | 345 | 23% |
| Lymm | 13 | 3,600 | 277 | 500 | 145 | 28% |
| Old Redcliffians | 13 | 4,481 | 345 | 624 | 138 | 34% |
| Redruth | 13 | 10,451 | 804 | 2,548 | 500 | 23% |
| Syston | 13 | 4,025 | 310 | 479 | 156 | N/A |
| Taunton Titans | 13 | 10,059 | 774 | 1,281 | 416 | 39% |

== Individual statistics ==
- Does not include promotion/relegation play-offs.

=== Top points scorers ===
| Rank | Player | Team | Points |
|---|---|---|---|
| 1 | Thomas Putt | Taunton Titans | 284 |
| 2 | Ben Webb | Loughborough Students | 211 |
| 3 | Ben Priddey | Camborne | 195 |
| 4 | Kyle Moyle | Camborne | 163 |
| 5 | Rory Vowles | Hinckley | 162 |
| 6 | Jake Gapper | Hornets | 159 |
| 7 | Thomas Jones | Luctonians | 145 |
| 8 | Sonny Greenman | Cinderford | 138 |
| 9 | Sam Rogers | Chester | 130 |
| 10 | Freddie Hirst | Exeter University | 122 |

=== Top try scorers ===
| Rank | Player | Team | Tries |
|---|---|---|---|
| 1 | Ben Priddey | Camborne | 39 |
| 2 | Alex Ducker | Camborne | 23 |
| 3 | William Callan | Hinckley | 22 |
| 4 | Ben Link | Luctonians | 21 |
| 5 | Joshua Sheppard | Hornets | 20 |
| 5 | Albert Stretch | Barnstaple | 20 |
| 6 | Brandon Moore | Barnstaple | 17 |
| 6 | Samuel Smith | Cinderford | 17 |
| 7 | Renico Bailey | Cinderford | 16 |
| 7 | Callum Dacey | Hinckley | 16 |
| 7 | Jack Goodwin | Luctonians | 16 |

== See also ==
- 2025–26 Champ Rugby
- 2025–26 National League 1
- 2025–26 National League 2 East
- 2025–26 National League 2 North
