= Regional 1 Midlands =

Level five rugby union league in England

- Current season or competition: 2025–26 Regional 1 Midlands
- Sport: Rugby union
- Instituted: 1987; 39 years ago (as Midlands 1)
- Number of teams: 12
- Country: England
- Holders: Bournville RFC (2nd title) (2025–26 (promoted to National League 2 West))
- Most titles: Broadstreet (4 titles)
- Website: clubs.rfu.com

Regional 1 Midlands (until 2021–22 known as Midlands Premier and up until 2016–17 known as National League 3 Midlands) is a level five semi-professional league in the English rugby union system. It is one of six leagues at this level. When this division began in 1987 it was known as Midlands Division 1. The format of the league was changed at the beginning of the 2009–10 season following a reorganisation by the Rugby Football Union (RFU), and the name change from National League 3 to Premier was introduced for the 2017–18 season by the RFU in order to lessen confusion for what is a series of regional leagues. Regional 1 Midlands is the highest regional rugby union league in the English Midlands.

Bournville are the 2025-26 champions and will be promoted to National League 2 West.

== Format ==
The club that finishes as champions is automatically promoted to National League 2 West. Relegated teams drop down to either, Regional 2 East Midlands, Regional 2 North Midlands or Regional 2 West Midlands, depending on their location, and other factors such as the location of relegated and promoted teams in other divisions.

The season runs from September to April and comprises twenty-two rounds of matches, with each club playing each of its rivals home and away. The results of the matches contribute points to the league table as follows:

- 4 points are awarded for a win
- 2 points are awarded for a draw
- 0 points are awarded for a loss, however
- 1 losing (bonus) point is awarded to a team that loses a match by 7 points or fewer
- 1 additional (bonus) point is awarded to a team scoring 4 tries or more in a match

== 2026–27 ==
Departing were Bournville promoted to Nat 2 West while Drybrook (10th - play off losers) and Dudley Kingswinford (11th) were both relegated to Regional 2 West Midlands with Nuneaton (12th) relegated to Regional 2 East Midlands. Also departing were Newent (4th) on a level transfer to Regional 1 South West.

Initially Loughborough Students were due to compete in this league having been relegated via the play-offs from National 2 West in which they finished 13th. However, when Macclesfield declined their allocation to National League 2 West for 2026-27 the Cheshire club were involuntarily demoted to Regional 1 North West which in turn displaced Burton from that league into this one. Consequently, Loughborough Students were reprieved from relegation and reinstated in National League 2 West for the forthcoming season.

Team	Ground	Capacity	City/Area	Previous season
Banbury	Bodicote Park	2,500 (250 seats)	Banbury, Oxfordshire	8th
Moseley Oak	Billesley Common	5,000 (1,300 seats)	Moseley, Birmingham, West Midlands	Promoted from Regional 2 West Midlands (champions)
Bridgnorth	Edgar Davies Ground		Bridgnorth, Shropshire	7th
Broadstreet	Ivor Preece Field	1,500 (250 seats)	Binley Woods, Coventry, West Midlands	Promoted from Regional 2 East Midlands (3rd - play off winners)
Bromsgrove	Finstall Park		Bromsgrove, Worcestershire	5th
Burton	Battlestead Croft, Tatenhill	5,500 (600 seats	Burton upon Trent, Staffordshire	Level transfer from Regional 1 North West (4th)
Lichfield	Cooke Fields	5,460 (460 seats)	Lichfield, Staffordshire	6th
Lutterworth	Ashby Lane		Lutterworth, Leicestershire	9th
Newport (Salop)	The Old Showground		Newport, Shropshire	2nd
Oxford Harlequins	Horspath Sports Ground	1,000	Horspath, Oxfordshire	Relegated from Nat 2 East (14th)
Stourbridge	Stourton Park	3,500 (499 seats)	Stourbridge, West Midlands	3rd
Syston	Barkby Road		Queniborough, Leicestershire	Relegated from Nat 2 West (14th)

Locations of the 2026–27 Regional 1 Midlands teams

== 2025–26 ==
Six of last years teams participated in this season's competition. Departing were Syston promoted to National 2 West while Silhillians (11th) and Kenilworth (12th) were both relegated to Regional 2 Midlands West. Also leaving were Burton (4th), Derby (9th) and Long Eaton (8th) all on a level transfer to Regional 1 North West.

Incoming teams, were the four promoted as champions from Regional 2 leagues - Drybrook (Regional 2 Severn), Lichfield (Regional 2 Midlands North), Lutterworth (Regional 2 Midlands East) and Newent (Regional 2 Midlands West). Also joining were Bournville relegated from National League 2 West and Newport on a level transfer from Regional 1 North West.

=== Participating teams and locations ===
Team	Ground	Capacity	City/Area	Previous season
Banbury	Bodicote Park	2,500 (250 seats)	Banbury, Oxfordshire	7th
Bournville	Avery Fields		Edgbaston, Birmingham, West Midlands	Relegated from Nat 2 West (14th)
Bridgnorth	Edgar Davies Ground		Bridgnorth, Shropshire	5th
Bromsgrove	Finstall Park		Bromsgrove, Worcestershire	3rd
Drybrook	Mannings Ground		Drybrook, Gloucestershire	Promoted from Regional 2 Severn (champions)
Dudley Kingswinford	Heathbrook	2,260 (260 seats)	Kingswinford, Dudley, West Midlands	10th
Lichfield	Cooke Fields	5,460 (460 seats)	Lichfield, Staffordshire	Promoted from Regional 2 North Midlands (champions)
Lutterworth	Ashby Lane		Lutterworth, Leicestershire	Promoted from Regional 2 East Midlands (champions)
Newent	Recreation Ground		Newent, Gloucestershire	Promoted from Regional 2 West Midlands (champions)
Newport (Salop)	The Old Showground		Newport, Shropshire	Level transfer from Regional 1 North West (6th)
Nuneaton	Liberty Way	3,800 (500 seats)	Nuneaton, Warwickshire	6th
Stourbridge	Stourton Park	3,500 (499 seats)	Stourbridge, West Midlands	2nd

Locations of the 2025–26 Regional 1 Midlands teams

=== League table ===
2025–26 Regional 1 Midlands
	Team	Played	Won	Drawn	Lost	Points for	Points against	Points diff	Try bonus	Loss bonus	Points	Qualification
1	Bournville (P)	22	18	0	4	866	409	457	17	3	92	Promotion place
2	Newport (Salop)	22	16	0	6	858	474	384	17	5	86	Promotion play-off place
3	Stourbridge	22	15	1	6	725	495	230	15	3	80	Promotion play-off place
4	Newent	22	15	0	7	799	549	250	16	3	79	
5	Bromsgrove	22	13	0	9	874	595	279	15	5	72	
6	Lichfield	22	12	1	9	654	572	82	13	6	69	
7	Bridgnorth	22	12	1	9	669	517	152	12	5	67	
8	Banbury	22	12	0	10	726	501	225	12	6	66	
9	Lutterworth	22	10	0	12	651	704	−53	14	2	56	Relegation play-off place
10	Drybrook (R)	22	4	1	17	419	734	−315	6	2	26	Relegation play-off place
11	Dudley Kingswinford (R)	22	2	1	19	378	892	−514	4	1	15	Relegation place
12	Nuneaton (R)	22	0	1	21	234	1411	−1177	4	1	7	Relegation place
If teams are level at any stage, tiebreakers are applied in the following order: 1. Number of matches won 2. Team with most draws 3. Difference between points for and against 4. Total number of points for 5. Number of matches won excluding the first match, then the second and so on until the tie is settled
Mint background is the promotion place. (1st) Green background is the promotion play-off places. (2nd–3rd); Pink background are the relegation play-off places (9th–10th) Salmon background are the relegation places (subject to confirmation by the RFU). (11th–12th); Updated: 13 April 2026

=== Play-offs ===
The champions, Bournville, are automatically promoted to next seasons National League 2 West. Third-placed Stourbridge won the Regional 1 Midland play-off against second-placed Newport (Salop) and in the Regional 1 South West play-off, second-placed Topsham beat third-placed Brixham. Stourbridge beat Topsham in Round 2 and lost to Exeter University, in the NLR Accession Final. Exeter University remain in National League 2 West. In each match the highest placed team play at home.

Promotion play-offs

25 April 2026

Newport (Salop) (2nd)	26 – 36	Stourbridge (3rd)

The Old Showground, Newport, Shropshire

25 April 2026
14:00

Topsham (2nd)	43 – 24	Brixham (3rd)

Bonfield Field, Topsham

Round 2

2 May 2026

Topsham	12 – 24	Stourbridge

Bonfield Field, Topsham

NLR Accession Final

9 May 2026
15:00

Exeter University (12th)	64 – 10	Stourbridge

Topsham Sports Ground, Exeter

Relegation play-off

The 9th and 10th placed teams held a play-off, with the losing team playing in the Regional 1 Accession Final, against Broadstreet, the winner of the Regional 2 Midlands East promotion play-off. Lutterworth remain in Regional 1 Midlands and Drybrook are relegated. Broadstreet are promoted to this league.

25 April 2026
14:30

Lutterworth (9th)	62 – 38	Drybrook (10th)

Ashby Lane, Lutterworth

Regional 1 Accession Final

9 May 2026

Drybrook	31 – 42	Broadstreet (3rd)

Mannings Ground, Drybrook

== 2024–25 ==
Departing were Oxford Harlequins who were promoted to National League 2 East. Old Halesonians and Broadstreet were relegated to Regional 2 Midlands West and Regional 2 Midlands East respectively. Stoke-on-Trent (5th) left on a level transfer to Regional 1 North West.

=== Participating teams and locations ===
Team	Ground	Capacity	City/Area	Previous season
Banbury	Bodicote Park	2,500 (250 seats)	Banbury, Oxfordshire	8th
Bridgnorth	Edgar Davies Ground		Bridgnorth, Shropshire	6th
Bromsgrove	Finstall Park		Bromsgrove, Worcestershire	3rd
Burton	Battlestead Croft, Tatenhill	5,500 (600 seats	Burton, Staffordshire	4th
Derby	Haslams Lane		Derby, Derbyshire	7th
Dudley Kingswinford	Heathbrook	2,260 (260 seats)	Kingswinford, Dudley, West Midlands	Relegated from Nat 2 West (14th)
Kenilworth	Glasshouse Lane		Kenilworth, Warwickshire	10th
Long Eaton	West Park	1,000	Long Eaton, Derbyshire	Promoted from Regional 2 Midlands North (champions)
Nuneaton	Liberty Way	3,800 (500 seats)	Nuneaton, Warwickshire	Promoted from Regional 2 Midlands East (champions)
Silhillians	The Memorial Ground		Solihull, West Midlands	Promoted from Regional 2 Midlands West (champions)
Stourbridge	Stourton Park	3,500 (499 seats)	Stourbridge, West Midlands	2nd
Syston	Barkby Road		Queniborough, Leicestershire	9th

Locations of the 2024–25 Regional 1 Midlands teams

=== League table ===
2024–25 Regional 1 Midlands
	Team	Played	Won	Drawn	Lost	Points for	Points against	Points diff	Try bonus	Loss bonus	Points
P	Syston	22	21	1	0	856	415	441	16	0	102
2	Stourbridge	22	16	0	6	870	491	379	15	5	85
3	Bromsgrove	22	14	0	8	820	394	426	14	5	75
4	Burton	22	12	1	9	697	652	45	16	3	69
5	Bridgnorth	22	11	0	11	716	536	180	14	8	66
6	Nuneaton	22	11	0	11	694	612	82	16	4	64
7	Banbury	22	10	0	12	673	612	61	14	4	59
8	Long Eaton	22	9	0	13	616	682	−66	13	5	54
9	Derby	22	10	0	12	565	756	−191	11	2	53
10	Dudley Kingswinford	22	10	0	12	444	473	−29	7	2	50
R	Silhillians	22	7	0	15	458	773	−315	6	2	36
R	Kenilworth	22	0	0	22	260	1273	−1013	3	1	−11
If teams are level at any stage, tiebreakers are applied in the following order: 1. Number of matches won 2. Team with most draws 3. Difference between points for and against 4. Total number of points for 5. Number of matches won excluding the first match, then the second and so on until the tie is settled
Green background is the promotion place. Pink background are the relegation places (subject to confirmation by the RFU). Updated: 19 April 2025; Source: "Regional 1 Midlands". England Rugby.

== 2023–24 ==
Departing were Dudley Kingswinford, promoted to National League 2 West. Lichfield and Nuneaton were relegated to Regional 2 Midlands North and Regional 2 Midlands East respectively. Oundle (7th) left on a level transfer to Regional 1 South East.

=== Participating teams and locations ===
Team	Ground	Capacity	City/Area	Previous season
Banbury	Bodicote Park	2,500 (250 seats)	Banbury, Oxfordshire	Transferred from Regional 1 South Central (10th)
Bridgnorth	Edgar Davies Ground		Bridgnorth, Shropshire	2nd
Broadstreet	Ivor Preece Field	1,500 (250 seats)	Binley Woods, Coventry, West Midlands	10th
Bromsgrove	Finstall Park		Bromsgrove, Worcestershire	4th
Burton	Battlestead Croft, Tatenhill	5,500 (600 seats	Burton, Staffordshire	6th
Derby	Haslams Lane		Derby, Derbyshire	8th
Kenilworth	Glasshouse Lane		Kenilworth, Warwickshire	5th
Old Halesonians	Wassell Grove		Hagley, Stourbridge, Worcestershire	Promoted from Regional 2 West Midlands (1st)
Oxford Harlequins	Horspath Sports Ground	1,000	Oxford, Oxfordshire	Transferred from Regional 1 South Central (4th)
Stoke-on-Trent	Hartwell Lane	2,000	Barlaston, Staffordshire	9th
Stourbridge	Stourton Park	3,500 (499 seats)	Stourbridge, West Midlands	Relegated from National 2 West (14th)
Syston	Barkby Road		Queniborough, Leicestershire	3rd

Locations of the 2023–24 Regional 1 Midlands teams

=== League table ===
2023–24 Regional 1 Midlands
	Team	Played	Won	Drawn	Lost	Points for	Points against	Points diff	Try bonus	Loss bonus	Points	Adj
P	Oxford Harlequins	22	19	0	3	905	372	+533	19	1	96	
2	Stourbridge	22	17	1	4	831	467	+364	16	3	89	
3	Bromsgrove	22	15	0	7	671	449	+222	11	4	75	
4	Burton	22	13	0	9	553	528	+25	11	5	69	
5	Stoke-on-Trent	22	12	0	10	623	596	+27	15	4	67	
6	Bridgnorth	22	12	0	10	628	574	+54	13	5	66	
7	Derby	22	11	0	11	670	638	+32	14	4	62	
8	Banbury	22	10	1	11	623	676	–53	14	2	58	
9	Syston	22	11	0	11	589	524	+65	8	4	56	
10	Kenilworth	22	7	1	14	595	704	−109	11	6	42	–5
R	Old Halesonians	22	2	1	19	416	728	−312	5	4	19	
R	Broadstreet	22	1	0	21	260	1108	−848	1	2	7	
If teams are level at any stage, tiebreakers are applied in the following order: 1. Number of matches won 2. Team with most draws 3. Difference between points for and against 4. Total number of points for 5. Number of matches won excluding the first match, then the second and so on until the tie is settled
Green background is the promotion place. Pink background are the relegation places Updated: 12 May 2024; Source: "Regional 1 Midlands". England Rugby.

=== Results ===
Home \ Away	BAN	BRI	BRD	BRM	BUR	DER	KEN	OLH	OXF	STK	STB	SYS
Banbury	—	43–26	38–12	25–23	12–18	24–32	39–17	54–29	7–54	36–32	13–13	45–15
Bridgnorth	41–33	—	57–12	22–23	16–25	50–33	31–24	25–5	34–25	27–29	26–21	40–23
Broadstreet	27–30	19–36	—	10–62	11–36	17–58	10–59	30–25	12–66	12–55	19–64	7–49
Bromsgrove	35–26	11–16	53–0	—	33–26	42–20	49–7	17–10	34–25	23–33	27–11	31–7
Burton	20–7	43–19	71–0	30–22	—	43–34	28–0	33–14	3–43	28–22	31–32	19–13
Derby	34–22	26–24	31–8	13–17	27–26	—	22–17	51–14	27–32	41–26	21–41	23–17
Kenilworth	28–34	29–51	24–19	36–41	29–22	37–31	—	36–36	16–38	24–25	35–52	32–23
Old Halesonians	21–41	5–14	36–7	17–26	28–34	22–45	25–42	—	14–47	31–15	7–41	10–14
Oxford Harlequins	47–25	50–5	97–7	38–26	34–10	37–25	53–17	36–17	—	41–21	18–13	40–19
Stoke-on-Trent	50–45	36–17	48–10	36–34	24–20	41–10	33–38	31–19	10–7	—	24–32	5–21
Stourbridge	66–12	32–29	60–8	31–28	57–10	42–33	36–16	36–16	22–27	60–10	—	34–25
Syston	36–12	27–22	53–3	10–14	51–5	39–33	34–32	53–15	8–50	20–17	32–35	—

Updated to match(es) played on 6 April 2024. Source: Regional 1 Midlands
Legend: Blue = home team win; Yellow = draw; Red = away team win.
For upcoming matches, an "a" indicates there is an article about the rivalry between the two participants.

== 2022–23 ==
This was the first season following the RFU Adult Competition Review. Departing were Newport (Salop) (champions), promoted to National League 2 West together with Sheffield (runners up) promoted to National League 2 North. Scunthorpe (8th), Doncaster Phoenix (12th) and Paviors (13th) all left on a level transfer to Regional 1 North East while Sandbach (5th) moved to Regional 1 North West. With six teams leaving and four joining the league was reduced from 14 clubs to 12.

=== Participating teams and locations ===
Team	Ground	Capacity	City/Area	Previous season
Bridgnorth	Edgar Davies Ground		Bridgnorth, Shropshire	4th
Broadstreet	Ivor Preece Field	1,500 (250 seats)	Binley Woods, Coventry, West Midlands	9th
Bromsgrove	Finstall Park		Bromsgrove, Worcestershire	6th
Burton	Battlestead Croft, Tatenhill	5,500 (600 seats	Burton, Staffordshire	7th
Derby	Haslams Lane		Derby, Derbyshire	Promoted from Midlands 1 East (3rd)
Dudley Kingswinford	Heathbrook	2,260 (260 seats)	Kingswinford, Dudley, West Midlands	10th
Kenilworth	Glasshouse Lane		Kenilworth, Warwickshire	Promoted from Midlands 1 West (2nd)
Lichfield	Cooke Fields	5,460 (460 seats)	Lichfield, Staffordshire	Promoted from Midlands 1 West (champions)
Nuneaton	Liberty Way	3,800 (500 seats)	Nuneaton, Warwickshire	11th
Oundle	Occupation Road	1,000	Oundle, Northamptonshire	14th
Stoke-on-Trent	Hartwell Lane	2,000	Barlaston, Staffordshire	Promoted from Midlands 1 East 3rd
Syston	Barkby Road		Queniborough, Leicestershire	3rd

Locations of the 2022–23 Regional 1 Midlands teams

=== Final league table ===
Regional 1 Midlands 2022–23
	Team	Played	Won	Drawn	Lost	Points for	Points against	Points diff	Try bonus	Loss bonus	Points
P	Dudley Kingswinford	22	17	0	5	671	372	299	13	4	85
2	Bridgnorth	22	16	0	6	631	499	132	13	5	82
3	Syston	22	16	0	6	761	414	347	13	2	79
4	Bromsgrove	22	13	1	8	666	480	186	14	7	75
5	Kenilworth	22	14	0	8	621	507	114	11	4	71
6	Burton	22	9	0	13	560	595	−35	12	7	55
7	Oundle	22	9	0	13	481	617	−136	12	6	54
8	Derby	22	10	1	11	562	691	129	9	2	53
9	Stoke-on-Trent	22	8	0	14	607	699	−92	13	6	51
10	Broadstreet	22	8	0	14	504	698	−194	9	5	46
R	Lichfield	22	6	0	16	544	836	−292	10	3	37
R	Nuneaton	22	5	0	17	485	685	−200	8	7	35
If teams are level at any stage, tiebreakers are applied in the following order: 1. Number of matches won 2. Difference between points for and against 3. Total number of points for 4. Aggregate number of points scored in matches between tied teams 5. Number of matches won excluding the first match, then the second and so on until the tie is settled
Green background is the promotion place. Pink background are the relegation places Updated: 12 April 2023; Source: "Regional 1 Midlands". England Rugby.

=== Results ===
Home \ Away	BRI	BRD	BRM	BUR	DER	DUD	KEN	LCH	NUN	OUN	STO	SYS
Bridgnorth	—	26–19	43–37	20–14	27–23	29–17	31–28	41–12	47–40	40–17	29–23	14–12
Broadstreet	14–25	—	14–22	49–36	29–15	26–29	22–37	17–22	25–22	32–27	38–25	17–90
Bromsgrove	25–19	43–21	—	38–7	40–15	25–27	31–19	22–27	37–13	67–7	45–26	8–10
Burton	12–18	26–24	27–21	—	31–33	3–27	20–29	47–19	20–21	27–10	36–29	19–45
Derby	10–36	28–24	26–26	31–30	—	28–41	24–47	23–27	20–17	38–35	66–29	36–48
Dudley Kingswinford	44–10	41–5	11–16	20–14	46–14	—	19–14	38–14	53–7	45–0	26–13	19–20
Kenilworth	35–45	25–27	50–28	20–19	38–8	27–21	—	57–21	24–19	22–17	27–17	15–16
Lichfield	14–50	30–32	28–36	50–38	26–32	22–42	39–22	—	21–34	33–36	22–34	14–51
Nuneaton	20–13	26–31	24–37	27–32	15–27	17–36	37–15	39–50	—	6–12	31–52	14–35
Oundale	18–14	38–24	24–22	12–31	21–23	22–25	12–20	24–10	29–32	—	63–12	28–19
Stoke-on-Trent	45–40	21–7	28–31	26–37	31–14	22–27	23–25	45–15	27–19	21–24	—	37–27
Syston	20–14	44–7	14–9	26–34	27–28	24–17	11–25	76–28	42–5	54–5	50–21	—

Updated to match(es) played on 25 March 2023. Source: Regional 1 Midlands
Legend: Blue = home team win; Yellow = draw; Red = away team win.
For upcoming matches, an "a" indicates there is an article about the rivalry between the two participants.

== 2021–22 ==
=== Participating teams and locations ===
Ten of the fourteen teams participated in last season's competition. They are joined by one relegated side, Scunthorpe (from National League 2 North), while the three teams promoted into the division are Dudley Kingswinford (from Midlands 1 West, Oundle and Syston (both from Midlands 1 East. Last season's champions, Bournville were promoted into National League 2 North. Teams relegated from the division were Kettering and Peterborough (who drop to Midlands 1 East). Also not returning are South Leicester who withdrew from the league during the 2019–20 season and drop to Midlands 4 East (South) for the coming season.

The teams competing in 2021–22 achieved their places in the league based on performances in 2019–20, the 'previous season' column in the table below refers to that season not 2020–21.

Team	Ground	Capacity	City/Area	Previous season
Bridgnorth	Edgar Davies Ground		Bridgnorth, Shropshire	4th
Broadstreet	Ivor Preece Field	1,500 (250 seats)	Binley Woods, Coventry, West Midlands	11th
Bromsgrove	Finstall Park		Bromsgrove, Worcestershire	6th
Burton	Peel Croft	5,500 (600 seats)	Burton, Staffordshire	9th
Doncaster Phoenix	Castle Park	5,000	Doncaster, South Yorkshire	7th
Dudley Kingswinford	Heathbrook	2,260 (260 seats)	Kingswinford, Dudley, West Midlands	Promoted from Midlands 1 West (champions)
Newport (Salop)	The Old Showground		Newport, Shropshire	2nd
Nuneaton	Liberty Way	3,800 (500 seats)	Nuneaton, Warwickshire	8th
Oundle	Occupation Road	1,000	Oundle, Northamptonshire	Promoted from Midlands 1 East (runners-up)
Paviors	The Ron Rossin Ground		Nottingham, Nottinghamshire	10th
Sandbach	Bradwall Road		Sandbach, Cheshire	5th
Scunthorpe	Heslam Park	1,212 (212 seats)	Scunthorpe, Lincolnshire	Relegated from National League 2 South (14th)
Sheffield	Abbeydale Park	3,300 (100 seats)	Sheffield, South Yorkshire	3rd
Syston	Barkby Road		Queniborough, Leicestershire	Promoted from Midlands 1 East (champions)

Locations of the 2021–22 Midlands Premier teams

=== Final league table ===
Midlands Premier 2021–22
	Team	Played	Won	Drawn	Lost	Points for	Points against	Points diff	Try bonus	Loss bonus	Points
1	Newport (Salop)	26	23	0	3	1008	464	544	21	1	114
2	Sheffield	26	21	0	5	742	340	402	14	3	101
3	Syston	26	17	0	9	741	423	318	14	7	89
4	Bridgnorth	26	16	2	8	742	655	87	16	3	87
5	Sandbach	26	16	1	9	733	537	196	12	4	82
6	Bromsgrove	26	15	0	11	774	582	192	15	4	79
7	Burton	26	12	1	13	721	695	26	18	5	73
8	Scunthorpe	26	14	1	11	627	786	−159	11	2	71
9	Broadstreet	26	10	0	16	565	698	−133	8	3	51
10	Dudley Kingswinford	26	10	0	16	509	674	−165	5	4	49
11	Nuneaton	26	9	0	17	559	754	−195	10	2	48
12	Doncaster Phoenix	26	7	0	19	465	763	−298	7	4	39
13	Paviors	26	5	2	19	438	860	−422	5	3	32
14	Oundle	26	3	1	22	470	863	−393	6	9	29
If teams are level at any stage, tiebreakers are applied in the following order: 1. Number of matches won 2. Difference between points for and against 3. Total number of points for 4. Aggregate number of points scored in matches between tied teams 5. Number of matches won excluding the first match, then the second and so on until the tie is settled
Green background is the promotion places. Pink background No relegation due to league reorganisation Updated: 5 June 2022; Source: "Midlands Premier". England Rugby.

== 2020–21 ==
On 30 October 2020 the RFU announced that due to the coronavirus pandemic a decision had been taken to cancel Adult Competitive Leagues (National League 1 and below) for the 2020/21 season meaning Midlands Premier was not contested.

== 2019–20 ==
=== Participating teams and locations ===
Nine of the fourteen teams participated in last season's competition. They are joined by two relegated sides; Peterborough Lions and South Leicester (relegated from National League 2 North), while the three teams promoted into the division are Bromsgrove, Kettering and Paviors. In order to address an imbalance of teams at level 5, Bedford Athletic have been level transferred into the division from London & South East Premier. Birmingham & Solihull were initially relegated into the division from National League 2 South but decided to drop out of the league system altogether (joining the Greater Birmingham Merit Leagues) as they became an amateur club.

Last season's champions, Scunthorpe were promoted into National League 2 North, along with Luctonians who won their play-off game against North Premier runners up Blaydon. Teams relegated from the division included Derby and Syston (who drop to Midlands 1 East) and Lichfield (who fall to Midlands 1 West).

Team	Ground	Capacity	City/Area	Previous season
Bournville	Avery Fields		Edgbaston, Birmingham, West Midlands	10th
Bridgnorth	Edgar Davies Ground		Bridgnorth, Shropshire	5th
Broadstreet	Ivor Preece Field	1,500 (250 seats)	Binley Woods, Coventry, West Midlands	4th
Bromsgrove	Finstall Park		Bromsgrove, Worcestershire	Promoted from Midlands 1 West (champions)
Burton	Peel Croft	5,500 (600 seats)	Burton, Staffordshire	8th
Doncaster Phoenix	Castle Park	5,000	Doncaster, South Yorkshire	11th
Kettering	Waverley Road	2,000	Kettering, Northamptonshire	Promoted from Midlands 1 East (champions)
Newport (Salop)	The Old Showground		Newport, Shropshire	3rd
Nuneaton	Liberty Way	3,800 (500 seats)	Nuneaton, Warwickshire	7th
Paviors	The Ron Rossin Ground		Nottingham, Nottinghamshire	Promoted from Midlands 1 East (play-off)
Peterborough Lions	Bretton Woods		Bretton, Cambridgeshire	Relegated from National 2 North (14th)
Sandbach	Bradwall Road		Sandbach, Cheshire	9th
Sheffield	Abbeydale Park	3,300 (100 seats)	Sheffield, South Yorkshire	6th
South Leicester	Welford Road Ground		Leicester, Leicestershire	Relegated from National 2 North (15th)

Locations of the 2019–20 Midlands Premier teams

== 2018–19 ==
=== Participating teams and locations ===
Nine of the fourteen teams participated in last season's competition. They are joined by Luctonians and Sheffield (relegated from National League 2 North), Broadstreet (relegated from National League 2 South), while the two teams promoted into the division are Burton and Syston. Last season's champions Birmingham & Solihull were promoted into National League 2 South following a level transfer, while runners up Peterborough Lions RFC were promoted into National League 2 North after winning their play-off game against Hull. Teams relegated from the division included Old Halesonians, Longton and Newbold-on-Avon who all drop to Midlands 1 West.

Team	Ground	Capacity	City/Area	Previous season
Bournville	Avery Fields		Edgbaston, Birmingham, West Midlands	10th
Bridgnorth	Edgar Davies Ground		Bridgnorth, Shropshire	5th
Broadstreet	Ivor Preece Field	1,500 (250 seats)	Binley Woods, Coventry, West Midlands	Relegated from National 2 South (16th)
Burton	Peel Croft	5,500 (600 seats)	Burton, Staffordshire	Promoted from Midlands 1 West (champions)
Derby	Haslams Lane		Derby, Derbyshire	8th
Doncaster Phoenix	Castle Park	5,000	Doncaster, South Yorkshire	6th
Lichfield	Cooke Fields	5,460 (460 seats)	Lichfield, Staffordshire	11th
Luctonians	Mortimer Park	2,500 (300 seats)	Kingsland, Herefordshire	Relegated from National 2 North (14th)
Newport (Salop)	The Old Showground		Newport, Shropshire	3rd
Nuneaton	Liberty Way	3,800 (500 seats)	Nuneaton, Warwickshire	9th
Sandbach	Bradwall Road		Sandbach, Cheshire	7th
Scunthorpe	Heslam Park	1,212 (212 seats)	Scunthorpe, Lincolnshire	4th
Sheffield	Abbeydale Park	3,300 (100 seats)	Sheffield, South Yorkshire	Relegated from National 2 North (16th)
Syston	Barkby Road		Queniborough, Leicestershire	Promoted from Midlands 1 East (playoff)

Locations of the 2018–19 Midlands Premier teams

== 2017–18 ==
=== Participating teams and locations ===
Nine of the fourteen teams participated in last season's competition. Scunthorpe were relegated from National League 2 North while the three teams promoted into the division included Newbold-on-Avon, Newport (Salop) and Bournville. Last season's champions, Broadstreet, were promoted into National League 2 South following a level transfer, while runners-up Sheffield went into National League 2 North, having won their playoff game. Teams relegated from the league included Bedford Athletic and Syston, with Sandbach given a reprieve by the RFU in light of the London Welsh liquidation, by virtue of being the best ranked third bottom side in tier 5 for 2016–17. Finally Towcestrians were level transferred from Midlands Premier into London & South East Premier, while Doncaster Phoenix were level transferred into Midlands Premier from North Premier to address an imbalance of teams in the three divisions. Birmingham & Solihull won the title on 7 April.

Team	Ground	Capacity	City/Area	Previous season
Birmingham & Solihull	Portway		Portway, Birmingham, West Midlands	5th
Bournville	Bournbrook / Metchley Park		Edgbaston, Birmingham, West Midlands	Promoted from Midlands 1 West (playoffs)
Bridgnorth	Edgar Davies Ground		Bridgnorth, Shropshire	6th
Derby	Haslams Lane		Derby, Derbyshire	9th
Doncaster Phoenix	Castle Park	5,000	Doncaster, South Yorkshire	Level transfer from North Premier (11th)
Lichfield	Cooke Fields	5,460 (460 seats)	Lichfield, Staffordshire	7th
Longton	Trentham Fields		Longton, Stoke-on-Trent, Staffordshire	11th
Newbold-on-Avon	Parkfield Road		Newbold-on-Avon, Rugby, Warwickshire	Promoted from Midlands 1 East (champions)
Newport (Salop)	The Old Showground		Newport, Shropshire	Promoted from Midlands 1 West (champions)
Nuneaton	Liberty Way	3,800 (500 seats)	Nuneaton, Warwickshire	3rd
Old Halesonians	Wassell Grove		Hagley, Stourbridge, Worcestershire	8th
Peterborough Lions	Bretton Woods		Bretton, Cambridgeshire	4th
Sandbach	Bradwall Road		Sandbach, Cheshire	12th (reprieve from RFU)
Scunthorpe	Heslam Park	1,212 (212 seats)	Scunthorpe, Lincolnshire	Relegated from National 2 North (15th)

Locations of the 2017–18 Midlands Premier teams

== 2016–17 ==
=== Participating teams and locations ===
Eight of the fourteen teams participated in last season's competition. They are joined by Broadstreet who were relegated from National 2 North while four teams were promoted into the league – Bedford Athletic, Bridgnorth, Derby and Towcestrians (who were level transferred from the south-west league on promotion) – as well as Sheffield who were level transferred from National League 3 North having finished 7th the previous season. Scunthorpe (champions) and Hinckley (play-off) were promoted into National League 2 North while Old Northamptonians were relegated to Midlands 1 East and Sutton Coldfield and Newport (Salop) both dropped to Midlands 1 West. In order to address a league imbalance due to only one team coming down from National League 2 South, Bromsgrove (who had finished 11th), were level transferred to National League 3 South West.

Team	Ground	Capacity	City/Area	Previous season
Bedford Athletic	Putnoe Woods	500	Bedford, Bedfordshire	promoted from Midlands 1 East (champions)
Birmingham & Solihull	Portway		Portway, Birmingham, West Midlands	7th
Bridgnorth	Edgar Davies Ground		Bridgnorth, Shropshire	promoted from Midlands 1 West (champions)
Broadstreet	Ivor Preece Field	250 (seats)	Coventry, West Midlands	relegated from 2015–16 National League 2 North (15th)
Derby	Haslams Lane		Derby, Derbyshire	promoted from Midlands 1 East (play-off)
Lichfield	Cooke Fields	5,460 (460 seats)	Lichfield, Staffordshire	11th
Longton	Trentham Fields		Longton, Stoke-on-Trent, Staffordshire	8th
Nuneaton	Liberty Way	3,800 (500 seats)	Nuneaton, Warwickshire	5th
Old Halesonians	Wassell Grove		Hagley, Stourbridge, Worcestershire	3rd
Peterborough Lions	Bretton Woods		Bretton, Cambridgeshire	4th
Sandbach	Bradwell Road		Sandbach, Cheshire	10th
Sheffield	Abbeydale Park	3,300 (100 seats)	Sheffield, South Yorkshire	level transfer from National League 3 North (7th)
Syston	Barkby Road		Queniborough, Leicestershire	6th
Towcestrians	Greens Norton Road		Towcester, Northamptonshire	promoted from South West 1 East (champions)

Locations of the 2016–17 Midlands Premier teams

=== Final league table ===
National League 3 Midlands 2016–17
	Team	Played	Won	Drawn	Lost	Points for	Points against	Points diff	Try bonus	Loss bonus	Points
1	Broadstreet (P)	26	20	1	5	759	412	347	13	3	98
2	Sheffield (P)	26	19	0	7	717	434	283	16	4	96
3	Nuneaton	26	19	1	6	737	441	296	12	4	94
4	Peterborough Lions	26	16	2	8	627	515	112	11	4	83
5	Birmingham & Solihull	26	17	1	8	545	445	100	7	0	77
6	Bridgnorth	26	13	0	13	511	485	26	5	6	63
7	Lichfield	26	11	1	14	593	775	−182	11	6	63
8	Old Halesonians	26	12	0	14	590	638	−48	11	3	62
9	Derby	26	10	0	16	646	715	−69	12	7	59
10	Towcestrians	26	10	1	15	526	625	−99	11	5	58
11	Longton	26	10	0	16	632	789	−157	11	3	54
12	Sandbach	26	9	2	15	564	678	−114	5	7	52
13	Bedford Athletic (R)	26	5	1	20	606	704	−98	12	12	46
14	Syston (R)	26	5	2	19	381	778	−397	2	3	29
If teams are level at any stage, tiebreakers are applied in the following order: 1. Number of matches won 2. Difference between points for and against 3. Total number of points for 4. Aggregate number of points scored in matches between tied teams 5. Number of matches won excluding the first match, then the second and so on until the tie is settled
Green background is the promotion place. Blue background is the play-off place. Pink background are relegation places. Updated: 29 April 2017; Source: "National League 3 Midlands". England Rugby. Archived from the original on 10 March 2015.

=== Promotion play-off ===
Each season, the runners-up in the National League 3 Midlands, and National League 3 North participate in a play-off for promotion to National League 2 North. The team with the best playing record, in this case Rossendale, hosted the match and lost to their opponents Sheffield, 31 – 32.

Team	Played	Won	Drawn	Lost	Points for	Points against	Points diff	Try bonus	Loss bonus	Points
Rossendale	26	21	0	5	852	443	409	14	1	99
Sheffield (P)	26	19	0	7	717	434	283	16	4	96

29 April 2017
15:00

Rossendale	31 – 32	Sheffield

Marl Pits

== 2015–16 ==
=== Participating teams and locations ===
Despite leading the table for most of the season Hinckley lost 13 – 23 on the final week-end of the season to Scunthorpe, to finish in second place for the second season in a row. Scunthorpe started the day four points behind and finished top due to winning one more match over the season. Two of last seasons promoted teams were relegated; Newport (Salop) to Midland 1 West and Old Northamptonians to Midland 1 East. The third relegated team is Sutton Coldfield.

Team	Ground	Capacity	City/Area	Previous season
Birmingham & Solihull	Portway		Portway, Birmingham, West Midlands	Relegated from National 2 North (15th)
Bromsgrove	Finstall Park		Bromsgrove, Worcestershire	6th
Hinckley	Leicester Road		Hinckley, Leicestershire	2nd (lost play-off)
Lichfield	Cooke Fields	5,460 (460 seats)	Lichfield, Staffordshire	9th
Longton	Trentham Fields		Longton, Stoke-on-Trent, Staffordshire	10th
Newport (Salop)	The Old Showground		Newport, Shropshire	promoted from Midlands 1 West (champions)
Nuneaton	Liberty Way	3,800 (500 seats)	Nuneaton, Warwickshire	4th
Old Halesonians	Wassell Grove		Hagley, Stourbridge, Worcestershire	5th
Old Northamptonians	Sir Humphrey Cripps Pavilion		Northampton, Northamptonshire	promoted from Midlands 1 East (play-off)
Peterborough Lions	Bretton Woods		Bretton, Cambridgeshire	3rd
Sandbach	Bradwell Road		Sandbach, Cheshire	8th
Scunthorpe	Heslam Park	1,212 (212 seats)	Scunthorpe, Lincolnshire	7th
Sutton Coldfield	Roger Smoldon Ground		Sutton Coldfield, West Midlands	11th
Syston	Barkby Road		Queniborough, Leicestershire	promoted from Midlands 1 East (champions)

Locations of the 2015–16 Midlands Premier teams

=== Final league table ===
National League 3 Midlands 2015–16
	Team	Played	Won	Drawn	Lost	Points for	Points against	Points diff	Try bonus	Loss bonus	Points
1	Scunthorpe (C)	26	23	0	3	766	343	423	14	2	108
2	Hinckley (P)	26	22	1	3	790	343	447	16	2	108
3	Old Halesonians	26	18	0	8	630	408	222	13	6	91
4	Peterborough Lions	26	15	0	11	593	464	129	10	4	69
5	Nuneaton	26	14	0	12	573	463	110	8	5	69
6	Syston	26	13	0	13	538	562	−24	11	4	67
7	Birmingham & Solihull	26	13	0	13	500	475	25	8	6	66
8	Longton	26	11	1	14	530	577	−47	12	3	61
9	Bromsgrove	26	12	0	14	559	670	–111	8	3	59
10	Sandbach	26	11	0	15	546	591	−45	9	4	57
11	Lichfield	26	9	0	17	600	683	−83	12	7	55
12	Old Northamptonians (R)	26	9	0	17	498	702	−204	6	7	49
13	Newport (Salop) (R)	26	8	0	18	451	738	–287	6	0	38
14	Sutton Coldfield (R)	26	3	0	23	412	967	–555	2	4	18
If teams are level at any stage, tiebreakers are applied in the following order: 1. Number of matches won 2. Difference between points for and against 3. Total number of points for 4. Aggregate number of points scored in matches between tied teams 5. Number of matches won excluding the first match, then the second and so on until the tie is settled
Green background is the promotion place. Blue background is the play-off place. Pink background are relegation places. Updated: 27 April 2016; Source: "National League 3 Midlands". England Rugby. Archived from the original on 10 March 2015.

=== Promotion play-off ===
Each season, the runners-up in the National League 3 Midland, and National League 3 North participate in a play-off for promotion to National League 2 North. The team with the best playing record, in this case Hinckley, host the match and they beat their opponents Wirral 33 – 20.

Team	Played	Won	Drawn	Lost	Points for	Points against	Points diff	Try bonus	Loss bonus	Points
Hinckley (P)	26	22	1	3	790	343	447	16	2	108
Wirral Rugby Club	26	19	0	7	677	486	191	13	4	93

30 April 2016
15:00

Hinckley	33 – 20	Wirral
	Report

Leicester Road
Attendance: 650

== 2014–15 ==
- Bournville
- Bromsgrove (relegated from National 2 North)
- Burton (promoted from Midlands 1 West)
- Dudley Kingswinford (relegated from National 2 North)
- Hinckley
- Lichfield (promoted from Midlands 1 West)
- Longton
- Nuneaton
- Old Halesonians
- Peterborough Lions (promoted from Midlands 1 East)
- Sandbach
- Scunthorpe
- South Leicester
- Sutton Coldfield

== 2013–14 ==
- Bedford Athletic (promoted from Midlands 1 East)
- Bournville
- Broadstreet RFC
- Hinckley
- Longton
- Lymm (transferred from National League 3 North)
- Newport (Salop) RFC
- Nuneaton
- Old Halesonians (promoted from Midlands 1 West)
- Sandbach
- Scunthorpe
- South Leicester
- Sutton Coldfield
- Syston

== 2012–13 ==
- Ampthill (transferred from National League 3 London/South East)
- Bournville (promoted from Midlands 1 West)
- Broadstreet RFC
- Derby (promoted from Midlands 1 East)
- Hinckley
- Longton
- Mansfield
- Newport (Salop) RFC
- Nuneaton (relegated from National Division 2 North)
- Sandbach (promoted from North 1 West)
- Scunthorpe
- South Leicester
- Sutton Coldfield (promoted from Midlands 1 West)
- Syston

== 2011–12 ==
- Broadstreet
- Dudley Kingswinford (promoted from Midlands 1 West)
- Hereford (relegated)
- Hinckley
- Longton
- Manchester (relegated from National League 2 North)
- Mansfield (promoted from Midlands 1 East)
- Newport (Salop)
- Old Northamptonians
- Rugby Lions
- Scunthorpe
- South Leicester
- Syston (promoted from Midlands 1 East)

== 2010–11 ==
- Broadstreet
- Bromsgrove
- Burton (promoted from Midlands 1 West)
- Hereford
- Kenilworth
- Longton
- Luton
- Malvern
- Newport (Salop)
- Old Northamptonians (promoted from Midlands 1 West)
- Peterborough
- Scunthorpe (promoted from Midlands 1 East)
- Sheffield Tigers
- South Leicester

== 2009–10 ==
First season as National 3 Midlands.

- Ampthill (promoted from Midlands 1 East)
- Bedford Athletic
- Bromsgrove
- Hereford
- Hinckley
- Kenilworth
- Kettering
- Longton
- Luctonians
- Luton
- Malvern
- Newport RUFC
- Peterborough
- South Leicester

== 2007–08 ==
- Bedford Athletic
- Broadstreet
- Dudley Kingswinford
- Dunstablians
- Kenilworth
- Kingswinford
- Longton
- Loughborough Students
- Luctonians
- Newport (Salop)
- Peterborough
- Scunthorpe
- South Leicester

== Original teams ==
When league rugby began in 1987 this division (known as Midlands 1) contained the following teams:

- Barkers Butts
- Hinckley
- Mansfield
- Paviors
- Peterborough
- Stafford
- Stockwood Park
- Stoke-on-Trent
- Walsall
- Westleigh (Note: Westleigh RFC would later merge with Wigston RFC in 1998 to form Leicester Lions RFC.)
- Wolverhampton

== Midlands Premier honours ==
=== Midlands 1 (1987–1992) ===
The original Midlands 1 was a tier 5 league with promotion to Area League North and relegation to either Midlands 2 East or Midlands 2 West.

Midlands Division 1
Season	No of teams	No of matches	Champions	Runner-up	Relegated teams	Reference
1987–88	11	10	Stoke-on-Trent	Barkers Butts	Peterborough, Hinckley, Stafford	
1988–89	11	10	Walsall	Hereford	Wolverhampton	
1989–90	11	10	Hereford	Birmingham & Solihull	No relegation	
1990–91	11	10	Towcestrians	Barkers Butts	Sutton Coldfield, Stockwood Park, Paviors	
1991–92	11	10	Stoke-on-Trent	Syston	No relegation (Note: Due to the merging of Midlands 2 East and Midlands 2 West into Midlands 2 for the 1992–93 season, there was no relegation.)	
Green backgrounds are the promotion places.

=== Midlands 1 (1992–1993) ===
For the 1991–92 season Midlands 1 remained a tier 5 league with promotion to Area League North. However, restructuring of the Midlands leagues meant that relegation was now to Midlands 2 (formerly Midlands 2 East and Midlands 2 West).

Midlands 1
Season	No of teams	No of matches	Champions	Runner-up	Relegated teams	Reference
1992–93	14	13	Birmingham & Solihull	Barkers Butts	Vipers, Paviors, Newark	
Green backgrounds are the promotion places.

=== Midlands 1 (1993–1996) ===
The top six teams from Midlands 1 and the top six from North 1 were combined to create National 5 North. Midlands 1 dropped to become a tier 6 league and was one of two feeder leagues for National 5 North. Relegation continued to Midlands 2 (currently Midlands 1 East and Midlands 1 West)

Midlands Division 1
Season	No of teams	No of matches	Champions	Runner-up	Relegated teams	Reference
1993–94	13	12	Barkers Butts	Worcester	Leighton Buzzard	
1994–95	13	12	Worcester	Burton	Derby, Towcestrians, Bedworth	
1995–96	13	12	Hereford	Burton	No relegation (Note: Widespread restructuring of the national leagues for the following season meant there was no relegation.)	
Green backgrounds are the promotion places.

=== Midlands 1 (1996–2000) ===
At the end of the 1995–96 season National 5 North was discontinued and Midlands 1 returned to being a tier 5 league. Promotion was now to National 4 North (currently National League 2 North), while relegation continued to Midlands 2 (currently split into Midlands 1 East and Midlands 1 West).

Midlands 1
Season	No of teams	No of matches	Champions	Runner-up	Relegated teams	Reference
1996–97	17	16	Hinckley	Burton	Stockwood Park, Leamington, Stafford	
1997–98	17	16	Whitchurch	Banbury	Derby	
1998–99	17	16	Bedford Athletic	Scunthorpe	Leighton Buzzard, Mansfield, Wolverhampton	
1999–00	17	16	Dudley Kingswinford	Scunthorpe	Belgrave, Lichfield, Hinckley, Syston	
Green backgrounds are the promotion places.

=== Midlands 1 (2000–2009) ===
Restructuring ahead of the 2000–01 season saw Midlands 1 remain a tier 5 league but promotion was now to National 3 North (formerly National 4 North) and relegation to either Midlands 2 East or Midlands 2 West (both formerly Midlands 2).

Midlands 1
Season	No of teams	No of matches	Champions	Runner-up	Relegated teams	Reference
2000–01	12	22	Scunthorpe	Leicester Lions	Stoke-on-Trent, Burton, Newbold-on-Avon	
2001–02	12	22	Broadstreet	Walsall	Banbury, Camp Hill, Hereford	
2002–03	12	22	Longton	Luctonians	Barkers Butts, Kenilworth, Hinckley, Malvern	
2003–04	12	22	Bedford Athletic	Kettering	Luton, Old Laurentians, Spalding	
2004–05	12	22	Leicester Lions	Kettering	Mansfield, Broadstreet, Derby	
2005–06	12	22	Rugby Lions	Bedford Athletic	Bromsgrove, Burton, Kettering	
2006–07	12	22	Luton	Dudley Kingswinford	Market Bosworth, Walsall	
2007–08	12	22	Loughborough Students	Luctonians	Dudley Kingswinford, Scunthorpe, Dunstablians	
2008–09	12	22	Broadstreet	Chester	No relegation (Note: No relegation due to nationwide league restructuring.)	
Green backgrounds are the promotion places.

=== National League 3 Midlands (2009–2017) ===
The division was renamed National League 3 Midlands following a restructuring of the national leagues which led to changes at all levels. It remained a tier 5 league with promotion to National League 2 North (formerly National League 3 North) and relegation to either Midlands 1 East or Midlands 1 West (formerly Midlands 2 East / Midlands 2 West).

National League 3 Midlands
Season	No of teams	No of matches	Champions	Runner-up	Relegated teams	Reference
2009–10	14	26	No champion (Note: A breach of regulations by Ampthill during the Luctonians game on 1 May 2010 led to Ampthill being denied promotion and transferred to National League 3 London & SE. By the time of the ruling Luctonians had already won their play-off against the runner-up of National 3 North so Hinckley were also promoted, despite finishing third.)	Luctonians, Hinckley	Bedford Athletic, Malvern	
2010–11	14	26	Bromsgrove	Sheffield Tigers	Burton, Kenilworth, Peterborough Lions	
2011–12	14	26	Rugby Lions (Note: Rugby Lions went into liquidation during the summer due to unpaid debts. The club was thrown out of the league, rejoining the league system in 2013–14 in Midlands 5 West (South).)	Dudley Kingswinford	Manchester, Old Northamptonians, Hereford	
2012–13	14	26	Ampthill	Sutton Coldfield	Derby, Mansfield	
2013–14	14	26	Broadstreet	Sutton Coldfield	Bedford Athletic, Syston, Newport (Salop)	
2014–15	14	26	South Leicester	Hinckley	Dudley Kingswinford, Burton, Bournville	
2015–16	14	26	Scunthorpe	Hinckley	Sutton Coldfield, Newport (Salop), Old Northamptonians	
2016–17	14	26	Broadstreet	Sheffield	Syston, Bedford Athletic	
Green backgrounds are the promotion places.

=== Midlands Premier (2017–2022) ===
For the 2017–18 season, all the divisions at tier 5 were renamed from National League 3 to Premier resulting in National League 3 Midlands now named the Midlands Premier. Promotion continued to National League 2 North and relegation to either Midlands 1 East or Midlands 1 West.

Midlands Premier
Season	No of teams	No of matches	Champions	Runner-up	Relegated teams	Reference
2017–18	14	26	Birmingham & Solihull	Peterborough Lions	Old Halesonians, Longton, Newbold-on-Avon	
2018–19	14	26	Scunthorpe	Luctonians	Derby, Lichfield, Syston	
2019–20	13 (Note: League reduced to 13 teams part way through the season after South Leicester decide to drop out of the league due to a lack of suitable playing strength and shortage of front row players.)	20 (Note: Due to the COVID-19 pandemic in the United Kingdom the RFU cancelled all rugby below the Premiership with most clubs in Midlands Premier having played 20 games, and a best playing record formula was used to decide the final table.)	Bournville	Newport (Salop)	Peterborough Lions, Kettering	
2020–21	14	26	Season cancelled due to COVID-19 pandemic in the United Kingdom.			
2021–22	14	26	Newport (Salop)	Sheffield	No relegation due to league reorganisation.	
Green backgrounds are the promotion places.

== Regional 1 Midlands (2022–25) ==
From 2022–23 season the number of tier 5 leagues was increased from four to six.

Regional 1 Midlands
Season	No of teams	No of matches	Champions	Runner–up	Relegated teams	Ref
2022–23	12	22	Dudley Kingswinford	Bridgnorth	Lichfield (11th) and Nuneaton (12th)	
2023–24	12	22	Oxford Harlequins	Stourbridge	Old Halesonians (11th) and Broadstreet (12th)	
2024–25	12	22	Syston	Stourbridge	Silhillians (11th) and Kenilworth (12th)	
Green background is the promotion place.

== Regional 1 Midlands (2025– ) ==
Regional 1 Midlands continued to be a tier 5 league. Promotion and relegation play-offs were introduced.

Regional 1 Midlands
Season	No of teams	No of matches	Champions	2nd	3rd	Relegated teams	Ref
2025–26	12	22	Bournville	Newport (Salop)	Stourbridge	Dudley Kingswinford RFC (11th) and Nuneaton (12th)	
Green background is the promotion place.

== Promotion play-offs ==
Between 2000–01 and 2019–20 there was a play-off between the league runners-up of Midlands Premier and North Premier for the third and final promotion place to National League 2 North. The team with the superior league record had home advantage. At the end of the 2019–20 season, the northern teams have been stronger with twelve wins to the Midlands seven, while the home team has won thirteen times compared to the away teams six.

Midlands Premier v North Premier promotion play-off results
Season	Home team	Score	Away team	Venue	Attendance	Reference
2000–01	Blaydon (N)	31–12	Leicester Lions (M)	Crow Trees, Swalwell, County Durham		
2001–02	Hull Ionians (N)	35–22	Walsall (M)	Brantingham Park, Brantingham, East Riding of Yorkshire		
2002–03	Luctonians (M)	3–17	Macclesfield (N)	Mortimer Park, Kingsland, Herefordshire	1,000	
2003–04	Cleckheaton (N)	23–10	Kettering (M)	Cleckheaton Sports Club, Cleckheaton, West Yorkshire	900	
2004–05	Hull Ionians (N)	19–18	Kettering (M)	Brantingham Park, Brantingham, East Riding of Yorkshire		
2005–06	Bedford Athletic (M)	17–24	West Park St Helens (N)	Putnoe Woods, Bedford, Bedfordshire		
2006–07	Beverley (N)	7–3	Dudley Kingswinford (M)	Beaver Park, Beverley, East Riding of Yorkshire		
2007–08	Huddersfield (N)	22–7	Luctonians (M)	Lockwood Park, Huddersfield, West Yorkshire		
2008–09	Hull (N)	40–15	Chester (M)	Ferens Ground, Kingston upon Hull, East Riding of Yorkshire		
2009–10	Stockport (N)	10–18	Luctonians (M)	The Memorial Ground, Stockport, Greater Manchester	350	
2010–11	Sheffield Tigers (M)	16–14	Chester (N)	Dore Moor, Sheffield, South Yorkshire		
2011–12	Dudley Kingswinford (M)	36–27	Rossendale (N)	Heath Brook, Kingswinford, West Midlands	1,000	
2012–13	Sutton Coldfield (M)	13–28	Harrogate (N)	Roger Smoldon Ground, Sutton Coldfield, West Midlands	650	
2013–14	Stockport (N)	52–22	Sutton Coldfield (M)	The Memorial Ground, Stockport, Greater Manchester		
2014–15	Sandal (N)	20–10	Hinckley (M)	Milnthorpe Green, Sandal Magna, Wakefield, West Yorkshire	200	
2015–16	Hinckley (M)	33–20	Wirral (N)	Leicester Road, Hinckley, Leicestershire	650	
2016–17	Rossendale (N)	31–32	Sheffield (M)	Marl Pits, Rawtenstall, Lancashire	413	
2017–18	Hull (N)	22–31	Peterborough Lions (M)	Ferens Ground, Kingston upon Hull, East Riding of Yorkshire		
2018–19	Luctonians (M)	33–17	Blaydon (N)	Mortimer Park, Kingsland, Herefordshire	1,757	
2019–20	Cancelled due to COVID-19 pandemic in the United Kingdom. Best ranked runner up - Harrogate (N) - promoted instead.					
2020–21	Season cancelled due to COVID-19 pandemic in the United Kingdom.					
2021–22	No play-off due to league reorganisation					
Green background represent the promoted teams. (M) stands for the Midlands teams while (N) stands for the Northern teams.

== Number of league titles ==
- Broadstreet (4)
- Scunthorpe (3)
- Bedford Athletic (2)
- Birmingham & Solihull (2)
- Bournville (2)
- Dudley Kingswinford (2)
- Hereford (2)
- Rugby Lions (2)
- Stoke-on-Trent (2)
- Ampthill (1)
- Barkers Butts (1)
- Bromsgrove (1)
- Hinckley (1)
- Leicester Lions (1)
- Longton (1)
- Loughborough Students (1)
- Luton (1)
- Oxford Harlequins (1)
- Newport (Salop) (1)
- Rotherham (1)
- South Leicester (1)
- Syston (1)
- Towcestrians (1)
- Walsall (1)
- Whitchurch (1)

== See also ==
- Midlands RFU
- English rugby union system
- Rugby union in England
