= Syston RFC =

English rugby union club, based in Queniborough

(England) Syston RFC
- Full name: Syston Rugby Football Club
- Union: Leicestershire RU
- Founded: 1887; 139 years ago
- Location: Queniborough, Leicestershire, England
- Ground(s): Barkby Road (Since 1989); Fosse Way
- President: Andy Ward
- Coach: Alex White
- League: National League 2 West
- 2025–26: 14th (relegated to Regional 1 Midlands)

Official website
- www.systonrfc.co.uk

Syston Rugby Football Club is an English rugby union team based in Queniborough, Leicestershire. The club run four senior sides, a vets, colts and all age groups from under-7 to under-19. The first XV currently play in Regional 1 Midlands, at the fifth tier of the English rugby union system, following their relegation from National League 2 West at the end of the 2025–265 season.

== History ==
Syston RFC was formed in 1887 when a number of players who lived locally or who attended nearby Barrow Grammar School came together to form the club. The club had various homes over the years in Syston and their first real home was on the Fosse Way in Syston where the foundations for the current club were firmly laid. With a permanent home at Fosse Way the club's fortunes began to improve, and by the late 1960s the club was beginning to flourish as the local schools took to playing rugby and a steady stream of players was assured.

== Honours ==
- Leicestershire County Cup winners (9): 1912, 1986, 1990, 1993, 1995, 1997, 2010, 2018, 2019 (Note: County Cup wins also include 1912 victory by Syston Street Old Boys who were an earlier incarnation of the club.)
- Midlands 1 East champions (4): 1990–91, (Note: 1990–91 title was when league was known as Midlands 2 East.) 2010–11, 2014–15, 2019–20
- Midlands 3 East (North) champions: 2006–07
- Midlands 1 (east v west) promotion play-off winner: 2017–18
- Regional 1 Midlands champions: 2024–25

== Notable players ==
Syston RFC has a history of developing young players with the club providing players for the County representative sides at all age groups for many years. A number of these players have gone on to play for Leicester Tigers in the top flight of English club rugby with some going on to represent England at full international level and Paul Dodge, also becoming England Captain and a member of the 1980 British Lions squad who toured in South Africa.

- Matt Cornwell
- Louis Deacon
- Brett Deacon
- Paul Dodge
- Matt Hampson

== Current standings ==
2025–26 National League 2 West table
Pos	Team	Pld	W	D	L	PF	PA	PD	TB	LB	Pts	Qualification
1	Camborne (C)	26	22	0	4	1106	658	+448	22	3	113	Promotion place
2	Luctonians (PP)	26	20	0	6	842	544	+298	20	3	103	Promotion Play-off
3	Hinckley	26	19	0	7	1002	722	+280	23	2	101	
4	Taunton Titans	26	14	0	12	894	795	+99	20	9	85	
5	Cinderford	26	13	0	13	779	765	+14	18	6	76	
6	Hornets	26	14	0	12	759	756	+3	17	2	75	
7	Barnstaple	26	13	1	12	734	777	−43	19	1	74	
8	Old Redcliffians	26	12	0	14	775	778	−3	18	7	73	
9	Lymm	26	12	0	14	726	812	−86	15	3	66	
10	Redruth	26	10	1	15	721	760	−39	17	7	66	
11	Chester	26	9	1	16	761	974	−213	19	6	63	
12	Exeter University (RP)	26	10	0	16	857	957	−100	17	1	58	Relegation Play-off
13	Loughborough Students (R)	26	8	1	17	837	1036	−199	20	4	58	Relegation place
14	Syston (R)	26	4	0	22	608	1067	−459	12	2	30	Relegation place

Updated to match(es) played on 25 April 2026. Source: National League Rugby
Rules for classification: If teams are level at any stage, tiebreakers are applied in the following order:
1. Number of matches won
2. Number of matches drawn
3. Difference between points for and against
4. Total number of points for
5. Aggregate number of points scored in matches between tied teams
6. Number of matches won excluding the first match, then the second and so on until the tie is settled
