= Bromsgrove RFC =

English rugby union club

Bromsgrove
- Full name: Bromsgrove Rugby Football Club
- Union: North Midlands RFU
- Nickname: Boars
- Founded: 1872; 154 years ago
- Location: Bromsgrove, Worcestershire, England
- Ground: Finstall Park
- Chairman: Clare Foster
- President: David Wellington
- Coach: Dan Protherough
- Captain: Tom Hardwick
- League: Regional 1 Midlands
- 2025–26: 5th
Team kit

Official website
- www.bromsgroverfc.com

Bromsgrove Rugby Football Club is an English rugby union football club based in Bromsgrove, Worcestershire. The club currently play in the fifth tier of the English rugby union system, Regional 1 Midlands, following their promotion from Midlands 1 West as champions at the end of the 2018–19 season. The club run four senior sides and a full range of junior sides.

== Honours ==
- North Midlands Cup winners (3): 1981–82, 2000–01, 2009–10
- North Midlands Cup Plate winners: 2014–15
- Midlands 1 West champions (4): 2001–02, 2003–04, 2008–09, 2018–19
- National League 3 Midlands champions: 2010–11
