= National League 2 West =

Level four rugby union league in Britain

National Two West
- Current season or competition: 2026–27 National League 2 West
- Sport: Rugby union
- Instituted: 2022; 4 years ago
- Number of teams: 14
- Country: England
- Holders: Camborne (2025–26)
- Most titles: Camborne, Clifton, Dings Crusaders, Leicester Lions (1 title)
- Website: National League 2 West

National League 2 West is a rugby union league at level four in the English rugby union system and provides semi-professional competition for teams in the Midlands, South West England and Cornwall. The remainder of England is covered by two other regional leagues; National League 2 East and National League 2 North. The champion club is promoted to National One. The last two teams are relegated to either Regional 1 Midlands or Regional 1 South West.

Prior to the 2022–23 season, National League 2 West and National League 2 East were part of a unified division known as National League 2 South.

== Structure ==
The league consists of fourteen teams who play the others on a home and away basis, to make a total of 26 matches each. The champions are promoted to National League 1 while the runners up go into the four team National 2 playoffs with the runners up from National League 2 East and National League 2 North, as well as the 11th placed side in National League 1.

The bottom two teams are relegated to either Regional 1 Midlands or Regional 1 South West, while the 12th placed side go into the four team Regional 1 playoffs with the 12th placed sides from National 2 East and National 2 North as well as the Regional 1 playoff winners.

The results of the matches contribute points to the league as follows:

- 4 points are awarded for a win
- 2 points are awarded for a draw
- 0 points are awarded for a loss, however
- 1 losing (bonus) point is awarded to a team that loses a match by 7 points or fewer
- 1 additional (bonus) point is awarded to a team scoring 4 tries or more in a match.

== Current season ==
=== Participating teams and locations ===
Team	Ground	Capacity	City/Area	Previous season
Barnstaple	Pottington Road	2,000 (575 seats)	Barnstaple, Devon	7th
Bournville	Avery Fields		Edgbaston, Birmingham, West Midlands	Promoted from Regional 1 Midlands (champions)
Cinderford	Beavis Memorial Ground	2,500	Cinderford, Gloucestershire	5th
Clifton	Station Road	2,200 (200 seats)	Cribbs Causeway, Patchway, Bristol	Relegated from National League 1 (12th)
Devonport Services	The Rectory Field	2,000	Devonport, Plymouth, Devon	Promoted from Regional 1 South West (champions)
Exeter University	Topsham Sports Ground (Note: Exeter University would also play one home game at Bonfire Field, home of nearby Topsham RFC.)		Exeter, Devon	12th
Hinckley	De Montfort Park	2,000	Hinckley, Leicestershire	3rd
Hornets	The Nest, Hutton Moor Park	1,100 (100 stand)	Weston-super-Mare, Somerset	6th
Loughborough Students	East Park (Note: Since relegation from the 2018–19 National League 1 Loughborough Students have switched games from the Loughborough University Stadium to nearby East Park.)	1,000	Loughborough, Leicestershire	13th (reprieved from relegation)
Luctonians	Mortimer Park	2,500 (300 seats)	Kingsland, Herefordshire	2nd
Lymm	Crouchley Lane	1,000	Lymm, Cheshire	9th
Old Redcliffians	Scotland Lane	1,000	Brislington, Bristol	8th
Redruth	Recreation Ground	3,500 (580 seats)	Redruth, Cornwall	10th
Taunton Titans	Summerfield Stadium (Note: Formerly known as Veritas Park.)	2,000 (198 seats)	Taunton, Somerset	4th

Locations of the 2026–27 National League 2 West teams

== League table ==
2026–27 National League 2 West table
Pos	Team	Pld	W	D	L	PF	PA	PD	TB	LB	Pts	Qualification
1	Redruth	1	1	0	0	61	10	+51	1	0	5	Promotion place
2	Taunton Titans	1	1	0	0	53	17	+36	1	0	5	Promotion play-off
3	Barnstaple	1	1	0	0	53	24	+29	1	0	5	
4	Lymm	1	1	0	0	50	27	+23	1	0	5	
5	Clifton	1	1	0	0	48	31	+17	1	0	5	
6	Old Redcliffians	1	1	0	0	27	24	+3	1	0	5	
7	Luctonians	1	1	0	0	27	19	+8	0	0	4	
8	Hornets	1	0	0	1	24	27	−3	1	1	2	
9	Cinderford	1	0	0	1	31	48	−17	1	0	1	
10	Loughborough Students	1	0	0	1	27	50	−23	1	0	1	
11	Exeter University	1	0	0	1	24	53	−29	1	0	1	
12	Hinckley	1	0	0	1	19	27	−8	0	0	0	Relegation play-off
13	Devonport Services	1	0	0	1	17	53	−36	0	0	0	Relegation place
14	Bournville	1	0	0	1	10	61	−51	0	0	0	Relegation place

Updated to match(es) played on 5 September 2026. Source: National League Rugby
Rules for classification: If teams are level at any stage, tiebreakers are applied in the following order:
1. Number of matches won
2. Number of matches drawn
3. Difference between points for and against
4. Total number of points for
5. Aggregate number of points scored in matches between tied teams
6. Number of matches won excluding the first match, then the second and so on until the tie is settled

== National Two West honours ==
List of National Two West honours
Season	No of teams	Champions	Runner–up	Relegated teams	Ref
2022–23	14	Leicester Lions	Dings Crusaders	Barnstaple, Stourbridge	
2023–24	14	Dings Crusaders	Luctonians	Dudley Kingswinford, Newport (Salop)	
2024–25	14	Clifton	Camborne	Devonport Services, Bournville	
2025–26	14	Camborne	Luctonians	Syston, Loughborough Students	
2026–27	14				
Green background is the promotion place.

== Number of league titles ==
- Camborne (1)
- Clifton (1)
- Dings Crusaders (1)
- Leicester Lions (1)

== See also ==
- English rugby union system
- History of the English rugby union system
- National League 2 East
- National League 2 North
