= North Midlands Cup =

- Sport: Rugby Union
- Instituted: 1971; 55 years ago
- Number of teams: 11
- Country: England
- Holders: Bridgnorth (1st title) (2018–19)
- Most titles: Stourbridge (7 titles)
- Website: North Midlands RFU

The North Midlands Cup is an annual rugby union knock-out cup club competition organised by the North Midlands Rugby Football Union and was first contested during the 1971–72 season with the inaugural cup being won by the now defunct Birmingham Police, who beat Evesham at the final held at The Reddings in Birmingham (formerly home of Moseley RFC). It is currently open for clubs ranked in tier 5-6 of the English rugby union system that fall under the North Midlands RFU umbrella, including sides based in Birmingham and the West Midlands, Herefordshire, Shropshire and Worcestershire. Originally the North Midlands Cup was the sole cup competition in the region but in 2001 and 2005, the North Midlands Shield and North Midlands Vase competitions were introduced for lower ranked clubs. A further change in 2014 saw the introduction of a 'Plate' competition for sides eliminated in the early stages of the cup, although it was not played for during the 2018-19 competition.

The current format is as a knock-out cup with a preliminary round, quarter-final, semi-final and final which is held at a neutral venue in March. Due to the disjointed numbers of teams several teams have to play in the preliminary round.

== North Midlands Cup winners ==
North Midlands Cup winners
Season	Cup Winner	Score	Cup Runners–up	Plate Winner (Note: Plate competition introduced for 2014-15 season for teams that were knocked out of the first round of the North Midlands Cup.)	Score	Plate Runners–up	Venue
1971-72	Birmingham City Police	10-4	Evesham				The Reddings, Birmingham, West Midlands
1972-73	Evesham	9-4	Old Edwardians				The Reddings, Birmingham, West Midlands
1973-74	Old Edwardians		Old Dixonians				
1974-75	Old Dixonians	21-3	Luctonians				The Reddings, Birmingham, West Midlands
1975-76	Old Dixonians	21-9	Stourbridge				The Reddings, Birmingham, West Midlands
1976-77	Dudley Kingswinford	13-10	Worcester				
1977-78	Worcester	9-0	Camp Hill				
1978-79	Dudley Kingswinford	11-0	Stourbridge				The Reddings, Birmingham, West Midlands
1979-80	Camp Hill	19-15	Hereford				The Reddings, Birmingham, West Midlands
1980-81	Stourbridge	7-3	Dudley Kingswinford				Sixways, Worcester, Worcestershire
1981-82	Bromsgrove	12-6	Worcester				
1982-83	Stourbridge	7-0	Dudley Kingswinford				
1983-84	Stourbridge	10-0	Bromsgrove				
1984-85	Stourbridge	15-3	Evesham				
1985-86	Stourbridge	10-6	Old Dixonians				
1986-87	Old Dixonians	26-0	Droitwich				The Reddings, Birmingham, West Midlands
1987-88	Hereford						
1988-89	Dudley Kingswinford	11-6	Old Yardleians				The Reddings, Birmingham, West Midlands
1989-90	Hereford	22-9	Old Yardleians				The Reddings, Birmingham, West Midlands
1990-91	Stourbridge						
1991-92	Hereford						
1992-93	Birmingham & Solihull	35-0	Hereford				The Reddings, Birmingham, West Midlands
1993-94	Camp Hill	17-11	Worcester				
1994-95	Stourbridge		Selly Oak				The Reddings, Birmingham, West Midlands
1995-96	Worcester						
1996-97	Whitchurch		Worcester				
1997-98	Worcester	60-7	Stourbridge				Sixways, Worcester, Worcestershire
1998-99	Whitchurch	19-15	Stourbridge				Sixways, Worcester, Worcestershire
1999-00	Dudley Kingswinford	15-13	Hereford				Stourton Park, Stourbridge, West Midlands
2000-01	Bromsgrove	34-10	Newport (Salop)				Stourton Park, Stourbridge, West Midlands
2001-02	Malvern	47-8	Aston Old Edwardians				Stourton Park, Stourbridge, West Midlands
2002-03	Aston Old Edwardians	24-12	Luctonians				Stourton Park, Stourbridge, West Midlands
2003-04	Aston Old Edwardians	12-9	Malvern				Heathbrook, Kingswinford, West Midlands
2004-05	Luctonians	14-13	Whitchurch				Stourton Park, Stourbridge, West Midlands
2005-06	Luctonians	10-9	Dudley Kingswinford				Stourton Park, Stourbridge, West Midlands
2006-07	Solihull	27-3	Malvern				Stourton Park, Stourbridge, West Midlands
2007-08	Luctonians	20-3	Hereford				Stourton Park, Stourbridge, West Midlands
2008-09	Luctonians	35-19	Dudley Kingswinford				Stourton Park, Stourbridge, West Midlands
2009-10	Bromsgrove	25-18	Bournville				Stourton Park, Stourbridge, West Midlands
2010-11	Newport (Salop)	25-12	Bromsgrove				Stourton Park, Stourbridge, West Midlands
2011-12	Dudley Kingswinford	26-20	Newport (Salop)				Heathbrook, Kingswinford, West Midlands
2012-134	Bournville	14-13	Worcester Wanderers				Heathbrook, Kingswinford, West Midlands
2013-14	Newport (Salop)	20-18	Worcester Wanderers				Heathbrook, Kingswinford, West Midlands
2014-15	Old Halesonians	52 - 6	Whitchurch	Bromsgrove	29-17	Dudley Kingswinford	Heathbrook, Kingswinford, West Midlands
2015-16	Birmingham & Solihull	20-20 (Note: After 80 minutes the game was tied 20-20 when Newport having received a penalty kicked for touch not realizing that extra time was not allowed in this cup competition, resulting in Birmingham & Solihull winning by virtue of scoring 3 tries to Newport's 2. This caused some controversy amongst players and supporters who felt that the referee had not made this clear hence Newport kicking off the field instead of going all out for a winner.)	Newport (Salop)	Whitchurch	24-22	Bromsgrove	Heathbrook, Kingswinford, West Midlands
2016-17	Bournville	25-25 (Note: Bournville RFC won by virtue of scoring more tries (4-3) than Old Halesonians.)	Old Halesonians	Bridgnorth	32-0	Hereford	Heathbrook, Kingswinford, West Midlands
2017-18	Newport (Salop)	40-16	Bromsgrove	Bridgnorth	47-7	Old Halesonians	Heathbrook, Kingswinford, West Midlands
2018-19	Bridgnorth	20-17	Dudley Kingswinford				Stourton Park, Stourbridge, West Midlands

== Number of wins ==
=== Cup ===
- Stourbridge (7)
- Dudley Kingswinford (5)
- Luctonians (4)
- Bromsgrove (3)
- Old Dixonians (3)
- Hereford (3)
- Newport (Salop) (3)
- Worcester (3)
- Aston Old Edwardians (2)
- Birmingham & Solihull (2)
- Bournville (2)
- Camp Hill (2)
- Whitchurch (2)
- Birmingham City Police (1)
- Bridgnorth (1)
- Evesham (1)
- Malvern (1)
- Old Edwardians (1)
- Old Halesonians (1)
- Solihull (1)

=== Plate ===
- Bridgnorth (2)
- Bromsgrove (1)
- Whitchurch (1)

== See also ==
- North Midlands RFU
- North Midlands Shield
- North Midlands Vase
- English rugby union system
- Rugby union in England
