= Louis Deacon =

England international rugby union player

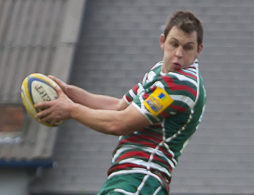
- Deacon playing for Leicester Tigers vs Bath at the Aviva Premiership in 2012
- Born: Louis Paul Deacon; 7 October 1980 (age 46) Leicester, England
- Height: 1.98 m (6 ft 6 in)
- Weight: 117 kg (18 st 6 lb)
- School: Ratcliffe College, Parkland School, South Wigston
- Notable relative: Brett Deacon

Rugby union career
- Position: Lock
Youth career
- Wigston, Syston RFC
Senior career
Years	Team	Apps	(Points)
2000-2015	Leicester Tigers	274	(45)
International career
Years	Team	Apps	(Points)
- England A
2005-2011	England	29	(0)

Louis Deacon (born 7 October 1980 in Leicester) is a former English professional rugby union footballer. He played lock.

== Career ==
His playing career started as an eight-year-old, playing with Wigston, before joining Syston RFC and as a Ratcliffe College student represented the Midlands county and both the England 16 Group and U18 Group School sides. He joined the Leicester Tigers Academy in the 1997–98 season and worked his way through the Tigers Youth, U21 and Extras teams.

Deacon joined Leicester Tigers in 2000. He made his first team debut in August 2000 as a replacement against Cardiff and has established himself as a highly dependable player and equally at home at the front or middle of the line out. In the absence of club captain Geordan Murphy through injury, he has captained for spells in the 2009–10 season.

Deacon was part of the Leicester squads that won the 2007, 2009, and 2010 Premiership finals.

He was called up to the England A squad in the 2002–03 season but injury forced him to withdraw.

Having lived in the shadow of the England pairing of Martin Johnson and Ben Kay for several seasons, he took the opportunity in 2003–04 to command a regular place during the World Cup. He made 23 appearances in all that season, and by the end he was being picked ahead of Kay.

In September 2003, he was named in the England National Academy Training squad. He was called up to the elite squad for the 2005–6 season and went on to make his international debut against Samoa.

He was again named in the elite squad, in the 2006–07 season. For the 2007 Six Nations opener against Scotland, Deacon started at Lock under new head coach Brian Ashton.

He continued in this position, throughout the first three games of the tournament, and came off the bench against France and Wales in the final two games of the tournament.

Deacon would have to wait a further two years before winning another cap, playing in the two test series against Argentina. He made it into the EPS Elite squad for 2009–10, and partnered captain Steve Borthwick during the Autumn Internationals. He then went on to play in every RBS 6 Nations Championship match last season, as he had done three years earlier, which not only illustrated the skill, but the resolution of Deacon, who went on to miss the summer tour of Australasia and the Investec Internationals through a back injury, which was a similar injury to when he underwent surgery on a prolapsed disc in June 2008 that ruled him out of the Investec Challenge Series and the subsequent RBS 6 Nations Championship.

On 17 February 2015, it was announced Deacon had retired from rugby due to injury.

== Coaching ==
After retirement, Deacon took up coaching roles with England men’s U20s, the Spanish national team and in the Leicester Tigers community department. In 2017/18 he was forwards coach at Coventry. The next season he moved to take up the same role with England Women. Upon the departure of Head Coach Simon Middleton, Deacon became Interim Head Coach for the period in 2023 when England won the inaugural WXV competition defeating New Zealand in the final and taking the team to world number 1.
