= Derby RFC =

English rugby union club, based in Derby

(England) Derby
- Full name: Derby Rugby Football Club
- Union: Notts, Lincs & Derbyshire RFU
- Founded: 1891; 135 years ago
- Ground(s): Haslams Lane, Derby
- Chairman: Martyn Murney
- President: Stephen Muir
- League: Regional 1 Midlands
- 2024–25: 9th
Team kit

Official website
- www.derbyrfc.co.uk

Derby Rugby Club is an English rugby union team based in Derby, England. The club runs four senior sides, a veterans team, a ladies team, a colts team and a full set of junior sides. The first XV currently play in Regional 1 Midlands, a fifth tier league in the English rugby union system.

== History ==
Derby Rugby Club was officially formed in 1891–92. It is believed that rugby union was played under the Derby name for a few seasons prior to this date but no written evidence to support this exists. The club has played at a number of grounds and has been at the present site at Haslams Lane since June 2002. Since then the club has progressed from Midlands 2 West to the national leagues, winning promotion in 2011–12 from Midlands 1 East to National League 3 Midlands, renamed in 2016 to Midlands Premier.

In 2016 the club was selected by the English Rugby Union to have an Artificial Grass Pitch (AGP) installed as part of its programme to invest funds earned by England hosting the 2015 Rugby World Cup into development of English rugby facilities. The artificial grass pitch opened in April 2018.

== Honours ==
- Midlands 1 (east v west) promotion play-off winners (2): 2001–02, 2015–16
- Midlands 1 East champions: 2011–12

== Notable players ==
- Jonathan Joseph began his career at DRFC
