= Luctonians =

English rugby union club, based in Herefordshire

(England) Luctonians
- Full name: Luctonians Sports Club
- Union: North Midlands RFU
- Founded: 1948; 78 years ago
- Location: Kingsland, Herefordshire, England
- Region: West Midlands
- Ground: Mortimer Park (Capacity: 2,500 (300 seats))
- Chairman: Simon Green Price
- President: Richard Corbett
- Coach: Ryan Watkins
- League: National League 2 West
- 2025–26: 2nd
Team kit

Official website
- luctonians.co.uk

Luctonians Sports Club is an English sports club based in Kingsland, Herefordshire. The rugby union team currently plays in National League 2 West, the fourth tier of the English rugby union system, following their promotion from the Midlands Premier at the end of the 2018–19 season via the play-offs. The club runs four senior sides and a full range of junior sides. Apart from rugby, Luctonians hosts the practice of cricket, golf, cycling, having also a netball, rounders, ladies touch and ladies contact section for women.

== Ground ==
Luctonians play home games at Mortimer Park on Hereford Road in the village of Kingsland – about 4 miles from the nearest town, Leominster. Ground capacity is around 2,500 – a figure that includes 300 seated in the modern grandstand (completed in 2013) – with the rest standing space. Due to its rural location the only access to Mortimer Park is by car, although there is ample parking space.

On 27 April 2019, Luctonians achieved a record attendance of 1,757, who watched them defeat Blaydon in the Midlands-North play-off, to achieve promotion to National League 2 North.

== Honours ==
- North Midlands 1 champions: 1993–94
- Midlands West 2 champions: 1994–95
- Midlands West 1 (Note: Not to be confused with Midlands 1 West.) champions: 1995–96
- Midlands 2 (East v West) promotion play-off winners: 2000–01
- North Midlands Cup winners (4): 2004–05, 2005–06, 2007–08, 2008–09
- Midlands Premier v North Premier promotion play-off winners (2): 2009–10, 2018–19

== Current standings ==
2026–27 National League 2 West table
Pos	Team	Pld	W	D	L	PF	PA	PD	TB	LB	Pts	Qualification
1	Redruth	6	6	0	0	265	121	+144	5	0	29	Promotion place
2	Taunton Titans	6	5	0	1	264	132	+132	5	1	26	Promotion play-off
3	Hinckley	6	5	0	1	253	108	+145	5	0	25	
4	Luctonians	6	5	0	1	198	129	+69	5	0	25	
5	Clifton	6	5	0	1	240	189	+51	5	0	25	
6	Lymm	6	4	0	2	198	202	−4	5	1	22	
7	Old Redcliffians	6	3	0	3	194	188	+6	5	1	18	
8	Cinderford	6	3	0	3	222	250	−28	5	0	17	
9	Loughborough Students	6	2	0	4	197	236	−39	5	1	14	
10	Hornets	6	1	0	5	180	200	−20	4	4	12	
11	Barnstaple	6	2	0	4	139	174	−35	2	1	11	
12	Bournville	6	1	0	5	212	348	−136	5	1	10	Relegation play-off
13	Devonport Services	6	0	0	6	145	294	−149	3	1	4	Relegation place
14	Exeter University	6	0	0	6	140	276	−136	2	0	2	Relegation place

Updated to match(es) played on 5 September 2026. Source: National League Rugby
Rules for classification: If teams are level at any stage, tiebreakers are applied in the following order:
1. Number of matches won
2. Number of matches drawn
3. Difference between points for and against
4. Total number of points for
5. Aggregate number of points scored in matches between tied teams
6. Number of matches won excluding the first match, then the second and so on until the tie is settled
