= Kingsland, Herefordshire =

Village in Herefordshire, England

Coordinates: 52.24825°N 2.81027°W

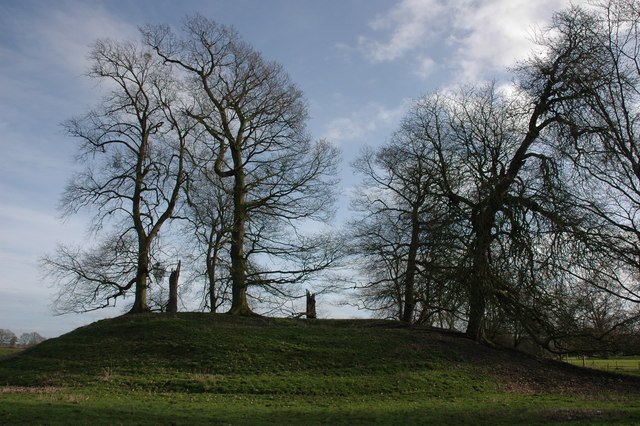
Kingsland Castle

Kingsland is a small village and civil parish in the English county of Herefordshire, 5 kilometres (3 mi) north-west of Leominster. The population of the civil parish at the 2011 census was 986.

The village church was built during the reign of Edward I (1239–1307) by Edward, Lord Mortimer and is dedicated to St Michael. To the west of the church are the earthwork remains of a motte-and-bailey castle, known to locals as 'The Mound'. Mortimer Park, located just outside the village, is home to Luctonians Rugby Club who currently play in the fourth tier rugby union league, National League 2 West.
