= Warwickshire 2 =

Tier 10 English Rugby Union League (1987–2006)

- Current season or competition: 2005–06 Warwickshire 2
- Sport: Rugby union
- Instituted: 1987; 39 years ago
- Ceased: 2006; 20 years ago
- Country: England
- Holders: Coventry Technical (1st title) (2005–06) (promoted to Midlands 5 West (South))
- Most titles: Harbury, Manor Park (2 titles)

Warwickshire 2 was a tier 10 English Rugby Union league with teams from Warwickshire taking part. Promoted teams moved up to Warwickshire 1 and there was no relegation since the cancellation of Warwickshire 3 back in 1992. Warwickshire 2 was cancelled at the end of the 2005–06 season with the majority of teams transferred into the newly introduced Midlands 6 West (South-East) or Midlands 6 West (South-West).

== Original teams ==
When league rugby began in 1987 this division contained the following teams:

- Berkswell & Balsall
- Coventry Saracens
- Earlsdon
- Harbury
- Manor Park
- Pinley
- Rugby Welsh
- Southham
- Spartans
- Silhillians
- Standard

== Warwickshire 2 honours ==
=== Warwickshire 2 (1987–1992) ===
The original Warwickshire 2 was a tier 9 league with promotion up to Warwickshire 1 and relegation to Warwickshire 3. At the end of the 1991–92 season the merging of all Staffordshire and Warwickshire leagues meant that Warwickshire 2 was discontinued for the years that these leagues were active (Note: The new format included four divisions; Staffordshire/Warwickshire 1, Staffordshire/Warwickshire 2, Staffordshire/Warwickshire 3 and Staffordshire/Warwickshire 4.).

Warwickshire 2
Season	No of teams	Champions	Runners–up	Relegated teams	Reference
1987–88	11	Manor Park	Southam	Rugby Welsh, Berkswell & Balsall	
1988–89	11	Coventry Saracens	Spartans	Standard, Pinley	
1989–90	10	GEC Coventry	Old Laurentians	Berkswell & Balsall	
1990–91	10	Manor Park	Silhillians	No relegation	
1991–92	11	Southam (Note: The restructuring of the Staffordshire & Warwickshire leagues meant that champions Southam were not promoted, instead being transferred into the new Staffordshire/Warwickshire 2 division.)	Coventrians (Note: Coventrians, Berkswell & Balshall, Pinley, Earlsdon and Rugby St Andrews would all be transferred into Staffordshire/Warwickshire 2 at the end of the season.)	No relegation (Note: Although there was no relegation due to the restructuring of the Staffordshire & Warwickshire leagues, the bottom five clubs including Harbury, Claverdon, Shipston-on-Stour, Atherstone and Old Warwickians would be transferred into Staffordshire/Warwickshire 3 at the end of the season.)	
Green backgrounds are promotion places.

=== Warwickshire 2 (2000–2006) ===
The restructuring of the Warwickshire league into two single divisions would see the reintroduction of Warwickshire 2 after an absence of seven years, this time at tier 10. Promotion was to Warwickshire 1 and there was no relegation. At the end of the 2005–06 season Warwickshire 2 was cancelled and all teams transferred to the newly introduced Midlands 6 (South-East) and Midlands 6 (South-West).

Warwickshire 2
Season	No of teams	Champions	Runners–up	Relegated teams	Reference
2000–01	10	Standard	Old Wheatleyans	No relegation	
2001–02	10	Harbury	Claverdon	No relegation	
2002–03	8	Pinley	Coventry Technical	No relegation	
2003–04	8	Harbury	Old Wheatleyans	No relegation	
2004–05	9	Stoke Old Boys	Pinley	No relegation	
2005–06	9	Coventry Technical (Note: Champions Coventry Technical were promoted into the new Midlands 5 West (South) at the end of the season.)	Coventrians (Note: Due to the cancellation of Warwickshire 2 at the end of the season, runners up Coventrians and the rest of the clubs in the division would be transferred into one of two newly introduced leagues - Midlands 6 West (South-East) or Midlands 6 West (South-West).)	No relegation	
Green backgrounds are promotion places.

== Number of league titles ==
- Harbury (2)
- Manor Park (2)
- Coventry Saracens (1)
- Coventry Technical (1)
- GEC Coventry (1) (Note: Currently known as Copsewood RFC - GEC Coventry was the clubs name up until 1996.)
- Pinley (1)
- Southam (1)
- Standard (1)
- Stoke Old Boys (1)

== See also ==
- Warwickshire 1
- Warwickshire 3
- Midlands RFU
- Warwickshire RFU
- English rugby union system
- Rugby union in England
