= Warwickshire 3 =

Defunct rugby union league in England

- Current season or competition: 1991–92 Warwickshire 3
- Sport: Rugby union
- Instituted: 1987; 39 years ago
- Ceased: 1992; 34 years ago
- Country: England
- Holders: Alcester (1st title) (1991–92) (transferred to Staffordshire/Warwickshire 3)
- Most titles: Multiple teams (1 title)

Warwickshire 3 was a tier 10 English Rugby Union league with teams from Warwickshire taking part. Promoted teams moved up to Warwickshire 2 and there was no relegation. Following restructuring of the Warwickshire leagues at the end of 1991–92 season, Warwickshire 3 was cancelled and the teams transferred into the newly introduced Staffordshire/Warwickshire 3 or Staffordshire/Warwickshire 4.

== Original teams ==
When league rugby began in 1987 this division contained the following teams:

- Alcester
- AP Lockheed (Note: AP Lockheed would be incorporated within Old Warwickians in 1989.)
- Caludon Castle (Note: Caludon Castle would be incorporated into Broadstreet Rugby Club in the late 1980s..)
- Coventrians
- Coventry Post Office
- Coventry Technical
- Old Warwickians (Note: In 2004 Old Warwickians RFC would merge with Warwick RFC to form Warwickian RUFC. Old Warwickians had previously incorporated AP Lockheed back in 1989.)
- Shipston-on-Stour
- Shottery
- Warwick (Note: In 2004 Warwick RFC would merge with Old Warwickians RFC to form Warwickian RUFC..)

== Warwickshire 3 honours ==
Warwickshire 3 was a tier 10 league with promotion up to Warwickshire 2 and there was no relegation. At the end of the 1991–92 season the merging of all Staffordshire and Warwickshire leagues meant that Warwickshire 3 was discontinued (Note: The new format included four divisions; Staffordshire/Warwickshire 1, Staffordshire/Warwickshire 2, Staffordshire/Warwickshire 3 and Staffordshire/Warwickshire 4.).

Warwickshire 3
Season	No of teams	Champions	Runners–up	Relegated teams	Reference
1987–88	10	Coventrians	Old Warwickians	No relegation	
1988–89	10	Lanchester Polytechnic	Berkswell & Balsall	No relegation	
1989–90	10	Rugby Welsh	Claverdon	No relegation	
1990–91	10	Pinley	Shipston-on-Stour	No relegation	
1991–92	9	Alcester (Note: The restructuring of the Staffordshire & Warwickshire leagues meant that champions Alcester were not promoted, instead being transferred into the new Staffordshire/Warwickshire 3 division.)	Warwick (Note: Warwick, Standard and Coventry Technical would also be transferred into Staffordshire/Warwickshire 3 at the end of the season.)	No relegation (Note: Although there was no relegation as such, the bottom six clubs - Rugby Welsh, Ford, Jaguar Coventry, Coventry Post Office and Shottery - would be transferred into Staffordshire/Warwickshire 4 at the end of the season.)	
Green backgrounds are promotion places.

== Number of league titles ==
- Alcester (1)
- Coventrians (1)
- Lanchester Polytechnic (1)
- Pinley (1)
- Rugby Welsh (1)

== See also ==
- Warwickshire 1
- Warwickshire 2
- Midlands RFU
- Warwickshire RFU
- English rugby union system
- Rugby union in England
