= Midlands 4 West (South) =

English rugby union league

Counties 3 Midlands West (East) / (South)
- Current season or competition: 2024-25 Counties 3 Midlands West (South)
- Sport: Rugby union
- Instituted: 2006; 20 years ago (as Midlands 5 West (South))
- Number of teams: 11
- Country: England
- Most titles: Woodrush (2 titles)
- Website: England RFU

Counties 3 Midlands West (East) / (South) (formerly Midlands 4 West (South)) is a level 9 English Rugby Union league and level 4 of the Midlands League, made up of teams from the southern part of the West Midlands region including clubs from parts of Birmingham and the West Midlands, Herefordshire, Warwickshire, Worcestershire and even on occasion Oxfordshire, with home and away matches played throughout the season. Each year some of the clubs in this division also take part in the RFU Junior Vase - a level 9-12 national competition.

Formed for the 2006-07 season, the division was originally known as Midlands 5 West (South) but changed to its present name for the 2008-09 season due to league restructuring. Further restructuring followed in the wake of the RFU's Adult Competition Review and from season 2022-23 it has been known by its current name. For season 2024-25 a new season a new East division was introduced.

Promoted teams move up to Counties 2 Midlands West (East) or Counties 2 Midlands West (West), depending on location, while relegated teams drop to Counties 4 Midlands West (South).

== 2026-27 ==
=== East ===
Departing were Broadstreet 2XV promoted to Counties 2 Midlands West (East) while Nuneaton II (11th) and Tamworth II (12th) were relegated to Counties 4 Midlands West (Central) and Counties 4 Midlands West (South East) respectively.

Also leaving were Handsworth (3rd) and Veseyans II (7th) on a level transfer to Counties 3 Midlands West (South).

Team	Ground	Capacity	City/Area	Previous season
Atherstone	Atherstone Town Cricket Club		Atherstone, Warwickshire	10th
Bedworth	Nicholas Chamberlaine School		Bedworth, Warwickshire	6th
Burbage	Recreation Ground		Burbage, Leicestershire	Promoted from Leicestershire RFU merit leagues
Coventry Welsh	Burbages Lane		Exhall, Coventry, West Midlands	Relegated from Counties 2 Midlands West (East) (9th)
Hinckley III	De Montfort Park		Hinckley, Leicestershire	5th
Keresley	John E. Radford Fields		Corley, Warwickshire	2nd
Lichfield II	Cooke Fields		Lichfield, Staffordshire	Level transfer from Counties 3 Midlands West (North) (3rd)
Old Wheatleyans	Stade Wheats		Coundon, Coventry, West Midlands	4th
Pinley	Wyken Croft		Wyken, Coventry, West Midlands	9th
Shipston-on-Stour II	Mayo Road	600	Shipston-on-Stour, Warwickshire	Promoted from Counties 4 Midlands West (East)
Stoke Old Boys	Albert Gale Field		Binley, Coventry, West Midlands	8th

Locations of the 2026-27 Counties 3 Midlands West (East) teams in Leicestershire, Staffordshire & Northern Warwickshire
Locations of the 2026-27 Counties 3 Midlands West (East) teams in Coventry & Southern Warwickshire

=== South ===
Departing were Woodrush (champions) and Cleobury Mortimer promoted to Counties 2 Midlands West (South) and Counties 2 Midlands West (North) respectively, while Bishop's Castle & Onny Valley were relegated to Counties 4 Midlands West (South West).

Team	Ground	Capacity	City/Area	Previous season
Camp Hill II	The Shrine		Shirley, Solihull, West Midlands	Promoted from Counties 4 Midlands West (East)
Dudley Kingswinford II	Heathbrook		Kingswinford, Dudley, West Midlands	7th
Handsworth	Charles Lewis Memorial Ground		Walsall, West Midlands	Level transfer from Counties 3 Midlands West (East) (3rd)
Harborne	Metchley Park		Birmingham, West Midlands	Relegated from Counties 2 Midlands West (East) (11th)
Hereford II	Wyeside		Hereford, Herefordshire	6th
Kings Norton	Hopwood Park		Hopwood, Worcestershire	Promoted from Counties 4 Midlands West (South)
Old Yardleians	Tilehouse Lane		Shirley, Solihull, West Midlands	8th
Pershore	Mill Lane		Pershore, Worcestershire	5th
Veseyans II	Memorial Ground		Walsall, West Midlands	Level transfer from Counties 3 Midlands West (East) (7th)
Walsall II	Broadway Ground	1,150 (150 stand)	Walsall, West Midlands	3rd
Warley	Tatbank Road		Oldbury, West Midlands	4th
Worcester II	Offerton Lane		Worcester, Worcestershire	Promoted from Counties 4 Midlands West (South)

Locations of the 2026-27 Counties 3 Midlands West (South) teams
Locations of the 2026-27 Counties 3 Midlands West (South) teams in the West Midlands

== East ==
Departing were Syston II (champions) and Lutterworth II (runners-up) promoted to Counties 2 Midlands East (North) and Counties 2 Midlands West (East) respectively. Old Saltleians II (11th) were relegated to Counties 4 Midlands West (East). Also leaving were Lichfield II (4th) on a level transfer to Counties 3 Midlands West (North).

Team	Ground	Capacity	City/Area	Previous season
Atherstone	Atherstone Town Cricket Club		Atherstone, Warwickshire	3rd
Bedworth	Nicholas Chamberlaine School		Bedworth, Warwickshire	6th
Broadstreet 2XV	Ivor Preece Field	1,500 (250 seats)	Binley Woods, Coventry, West Midlands	Relegated from Counties 2 Midlands West (East) (9th)
Handsworth	Charles Lewis Memorial Ground		Walsall, West Midlands	Level transfer from Counties 3 Midlands West (North) (6th)
Hinckley III	De Montfort Park		Hinckley, Leicestershire	5th
Keresley	John E. Radford Fields		Corley, Warwickshire	Promoted from Counties 4 Midlands West (South) (3rd)
Nuneaton II	Liberty Way		Nuneaton, Warwickshire	7th
Old Wheatleyans	Stade Wheats		Coundon, Coventry, West Midlands	Relegated from Counties 2 Midlands West (East) (10th)
Pinley	Wyken Croft		Wyken, Coventry, West Midlands	8th
Stoke Old Boys	Albert Gale Field		Binley, Coventry, West Midlands	Relegated from Counties 2 Midlands West (East) (11th)
Tamworth II	Wigginton Park		Tamworth, Staffordshire	10th
Veseyans II	Memorial Ground		Walsall, West Midlands	9th

Locations of the 2025-26 Counties 3 Midlands West (East) teams in Leicestershire, Staffordshire & Warwickshire
Locations of the 2025-26 Counties 3 Midlands West (East) teams in the West Midlands & Coventry

== South ==
Departing were Upton-upon-Severn (champions) and Bournville II (runners-up) promoted to Counties 2 Midlands West (East) while Malvern II (10th), Kings Norton (11th) and Worcester II (12th) were all relegated to Counties 4 Midlands West (South).

Droitwich II and Evesham II were both promoted into the league from Counties 4 Midlands West (South) having finished 4th and 2nd respectively. Both however withdrew from the league as did Edwardians II (8th in 2024-25) leaving nine clubs to contest the outstanding fixtures.

Team	Ground	Capacity	City/Area	Previous season
Bishop's Castle & Onny Valley	Bishop's Castle Community College		Bishop's Castle, Shropshire	Promoted from Counties 4 Midlands West (South) (Champions)
Cleobury Mortimer	Love Lane		Cleobury Mortimer, Shropshire	4th
Dudley Kingswinford II	Heathbrook		Kingswinford, Dudley, West Midlands	6th
Hereford II	Wyeside		Hereford, Herefordshire	9th
Old Yardleians	Tilehouse Lane		Shirley, Solihull, West Midlands	5th
Pershore	Mill Lane		Pershore, Worcestershire	7th
Walsall II	Broadway Ground	1,150 (150 stand)	Walsall, West Midlands	Relegated from Counties 2 Midlands West (West) (9th)
Warley	Tatbank Road		Oldbury, West Midlands	Promoted from Counties 4 Midlands West (North)
Woodrush	Icknield Street		Forhill, Worcestershire	3rd

Locations of the 2025-26 Counties 3 Midlands West (South) teams
Locations of the 2025-26 Counties 3 Midlands West (South) teams in the West Midlands

== 2024-25 ==
Ahead of the season a new East division was introduced.

== East ==
The league was formed with three teams - Bedworth, Pinley & Tamworth II - moving on a level transfer from the Counties 3 Midlands West (South) league and the addition of the 2XV/3XVs from eight clubs; these included three - Hinckley, Lutterworth and Syston - from Leicestershire whose teams would historically competed in East Midlands RFU reserve leagues.

Team	Ground	Capacity	City/Area	Previous season
Atherstone	Atherstone Town Cricket Club		Atherstone, Warwickshire	Promoted from Counties 4 Midlands West (North)
Bedworth	Nicholas Chamberlaine School		Bedworth, Warwickshire	Level transfer from Counties 3 Midlands West (South) (6th)
Hinckley III	De Montfort Park		Hinckley, Leicestershire	New entry
Lichfield II	Cooke Fields		Lichfield, Staffordshire	New entry
Lutterworth II	Ashby Lane		Lutterworth, Leicestershire	New entry
Nuneaton II	Liberty Way		Nuneaton, Warwickshire	New entry
Old Saltleians II	Watton Lane		Water Orton, Warwickshire	New entry
Pinley	Wyken Croft		Wyken, Coventry, West Midlands	Level transfer from Counties 3 Midlands West (South) (7th)
Syston II	Barkby Road		Queniborough, Leicestershire	New entry
Tamworth II	Wigginton Park		Tamworth, Staffordshire	Level transfer from Counties 3 Midlands West (South) (9th)
Veseyans II	Memorial Ground		Walsall, West Midlands	New entry

Locations of the 2024-25 Counties 3 Midlands West (East) teams in Leicestershire & Warwickshire
Locations of the 2024-25 Counties 3 Midlands West (East) teams in Staffordshire & the West Midlands

== South ==
Departing were Harbury and Stoke Old Boys, both promoted to Counties 2 Midlands West (East). Old Leamingtonians II (12th) were relegated to Counties 4 Midlands West (South). Kenilworth II (11th) did not return for the new season. Also leaving, but on a level transfer were Bedworth (6th), Pinley (7th) and Tamworth II (9th), all tot the newly formed Counties 3 Midlands West (East).

Joining were Edwardians II, Bournville II, Malvern, Dudley Kingswinford II, Upton-upon-Severn, Woodrush and Cleobury Mortimer.

Team	Ground	Capacity	City/Area	Previous season
Bournville II	Avery Fields		Edgbaston, Birmingham, West Midlands	New entry
Cleobury Mortimer	Love Lane		Cleobury Mortimer, Shropshire	Level transfer from Counties 3 Midlands West (North) (6th)
Dudley Kingswinford II	Heathbrook		Kingswinford, Dudley, West Midlands	New entry
Edwardians II	Memorial Ground		Solihull, West Midlands	New entry
Hereford II	Wyeside		Hereford, Herefordshire	4th
Kings Norton	Hopwood Park		Hopwood, Worcestershire	10th
Malvern II	Spring Lane		Malvern, Worcestershire	Promoted from Counties 4 Midlands West (South)
Old Yardleians	Tilehouse Lane		Shirley, Solihull, West Midlands	5th
Pershore	Mill Lane		Pershore, Worcestershire	3rd
Upton-upon-Severn	Banwell Park		Upton-upon-Severn, Worcestershire	Promoted from Counties 4 Midlands West (South)
Woodrush	Icknield Street		Forhill, Worcestershire	Relegated from Counties 2 Midlands West (East)
Worcester II	Offerton Lane		Worcester, Worcestershire	8th

Locations of the 2024-25 Counties 3 Midlands West (South) teams
Locations of the 2024-25 Counties 3 Midlands West (South) teams in Birmingham & the West Midlands

== 2023-24 ==
Departing were Birmingham & Solihull and Coventrians, both promoted to Counties 2 Midlands West (East). Birmingham Exiles (10th) and Upton-upon-Severn (11th) were relegated to Counties 4 Midlands West (South). Rugby Welsh (6th) went on a level transfer to Counties 3 Midlands East (South).

Joining were Pinley (12th) and Kenilworth II, both relegated. Also entering the league were Hereford II, Worcester II, Tamworth II and Old Leamingtonians II.

Team	Ground	Capacity	City/Area	Previous season
Bedworth	Nicholas Chamberlaine School		Bedworth, Warwickshire	7th
Harbury	Waterloo Fields		Harbury, Warwickshire	3rd
Hereford II	Wyeside		Hereford, Herefordshire	New entry
Kenilworth II	Glasshouse Lane		Kenilworth, Warwickshire	Relegated from Counties 2 Midlands West (South)
Kings Norton	Hopwood Park		Hopwood, Worcestershire	8th
Old Leamingtonians II	The Crofts		Blackdown, Warwickshire	New entry
Old Yardleians	Tilehouse Lane		Shirley, Solihull, West Midlands	9th
Pershore	Mill Lane		Pershore, Worcestershire	4th
Pinley	Wyken Croft		Wyken, Coventry, West Midlands	Relegated from Counties 2 Midlands West (South)
Stoke Old Boys	Albert Gale Field		Binley, Coventry, West Midlands	5th
Tamworth II	Wigginton Park		Tamworth, Staffordshire	New entry
Worcester II	Offerton Lane		Worcester, Worcestershire	New entry

Locations of the 2023-24 Counties 3 Midlands West (South) teams
Locations of the 2023-24 Counties 3 Midlands West (South) teams in Coventry & the West Midlands

== 2022-23 ==
This was the first season following the RFU Adult Competition Review with the league adopting its new name of Counties 3 Midlands West (South).

Departing were Claverdon and Old Wheatleyans, both promoted to Counties 2 Midlands West (South). Chaddesley Corbett (8th) did not return for the new season.

Joining were Birmingham & Solihull, Birmingham Exiles and Stoke Old Boys.

Team	Ground	Capacity	City/Area	Previous season
Bedworth	Nicholas Chamberlaine School		Bedworth, Warwickshire	3rd
Birmingham Exiles	Old Damson Lane		Elmdon, West Midlands	Level transfer from Midlands 4 West (North) (10th)
Birmingham & Solihull	Portway		Portway, Birmingham, West Midlands	Promoted from Midlands 5 West (South)
Coventrians	The Black Pad		Holbrooks, Coventry, West Midlands	9th
Harbury	Waterloo Fields		Harbury, Warwickshire	6th
Kings Norton	Hopwood Park		Hopwood, Worcestershire	11th
Old Yardleians	Tilehouse Lane		Shirley, Solihull, West Midlands	5th
Pershore	Mill Lane		Pershore, Worcestershire	10th
Rugby Welsh	Alwyn Road		Rugby, Warwickshire	7th
Stoke Old Boys	Albert Gale Field		Binley, Coventry, West Midlands	Relegated from Midlands 3 West (South)
Upton-upon-Severn	Banwell Park		Upton-upon-Severn, Worcestershire	4th

Locations of the 2022-23 Counties 3 Midlands West (South) teams in Warwickshaire & Worcestershire
Locations of the 2022-23 Counties 3 Midlands West (South) teams in Coventry & the West Midlands

== 2021-22 ==
=== Participating teams & locations ===
Birmingham Civil Service, who finished 10th in 2019-20, did not return for the current season.

Team	Ground	Capacity	City/Area	Previous season
Bedworth	Nicholas Chamberlaine School		Bedworth, Warwickshire	Relegated from Midlands 3 WS (12th)
Chaddesley Corbett	Fox Lane		Chaddesley Corbett, Worcestershire	Promoted from Midlands 5 WS (runners up)
Claverdon	Stadium of Dreams		Claverdon, Warwickshire	8th
Coventrians	The Black Pad		Holbrooks, Coventry, West Midlands	4th
Harbury	Waterloo Fields		Harbury, Warwickshire	9th
Kings Norton	Hopwood Park		Hopwood, Worcestershire	11th
Old Wheatleyans	Stade Wheats		Coundon, Coventry, West Midlands	5th
Old Yardleians	Tilehouse Lane		Shirley, Solihull, West Midlands	3rd
Pershore	Mill Lane		Pershore, Worcestershire	7th
Rugby Welsh	Alwyn Road		Rugby, Warwickshire	Promoted from Midlands 5 WS (champions)
Upton-upon-Severn	Banwell Park		Upton-upon-Severn, Worcestershire	6th

Locations of the 2021-22 Midlands 4 West (South) teams in Worcestershire
Locations of the 2021-22 Midlands 4 West (South) teams in Warwickshire & West Midlands

== 2020–21 ==
Due to the COVID-19 pandemic, the 2020–21 season was cancelled.

== 2019–20 ==
=== Participating teams & locations ===
Team	Ground	Capacity	City/Area	Previous season
Birmingham Civil Service	Land Rover Social Club		Solihull, West Midlands	Promoted from Midlands 5 WS (runners up)
Bromyard	Clive Richards Sports Ground		Bromyard, Herefordshire	6th
Claverdon	Stadium of Dreams		Claverdon, Warwickshire	4th
Coventrians	The Black Pad		Holbrooks, Coventry, West Midlands	9th
Harbury	Waterloo Fields		Harbury, Warwickshire	8th
Kings Norton	Hopwood Park		Hopwood, Worcestershire	7th
Old Wheatleyans	Stade Wheats		Coundon, Coventry, West Midlands	3rd
Old Yardleians	Tilehouse Lane		Shirley, Solihull, West Midlands	Relegated from Midlands 3 WS (11th)
Pershore	Mill Lane		Pershore, Worcestershire	5th
Tenbury	Penlu		Tenbury Wells, Worcestershire	Promoted from Midlands 5 WN (champions)
Upton-upon-Severn	Banwell Park		Upton-upon-Severn, Worcestershire	Relegated from Midlands 3 WS (12th)

Locations of the 2019–20 Midlands 4 West (South) teams in Worcestershire & Herefordshire
Locations of the 2019–20 Midlands 4 West (South) teams in Warwickshire & West Midlands

== 2018–19 ==
=== Participating teams & locations ===
Team	Ground	Capacity	City/Area	Previous season
Bedworth	Nicholas Chamberlaine School		Bedworth, Warwickshire	3rd
Bromyard	Clive Richards Sports Ground		Bromyard, Herefordshire	Relegated from Midlands 3 West (South) (12th)
Burbage	Recreation Ground		Burbage, Leicestershire	5th
Claverdon	Stadium of Dreams		Claverdon, Warwickshire	7th
Coventrians	The Black Pad		Holbrooks, Coventry, West Midlands	4th
Greyhound	Hereford City Sports Club		Hereford, Herefordshire	Promoted from Midlands 5 West (North) (champions)
Harbury	Waterloo Fields		Harbury, Warwickshire	8th
Kings Norton	Hopwood Park		Hopwood, Worcestershire	Promoted from Midlands 5 West (South) (runners up)
Old Wheatleyans	Stade Wheats		Coundon, Coventry, West Midlands	Relegated from Midlands 3 West (South) (11th)
Pershore	Mill Lane		Pershore, Worcestershire	6th
Redditch	Bromsgrove Road		Redditch, Worcestershire	9th

Locations of the 2018–19 Midlands 4 West (South) teams in Herefordshire
Locations of the 2018–19 Midlands 4 West (South) teams in Warwickshire, West Midlands, Worcestershire & Leicestershire

== 2017–18 ==
=== Participating teams & locations ===
Team	Ground	Capacity	City/Area	Previous season
Bedworth	Nicholas Chamberlaine School		Bedworth, Warwickshire	Relegated from Midlands 3 West (South) (12th)
Birmingham Civil Service	Landrover Social Club		Solihull, West Midlands	Promoted from Midlands 5 West (South) (runners up)
Burbage	Recreation Ground		Burbage, Leicestershire	Promoted from Midlands 5 West (South) (champions)
Claverdon	Stadium of Dreams		Claverdon, Warwickshire	6th
Coventrians	The Black Pad		Holbrooks, Coventry, West Midlands	5th
Coventry Welsh	Burbages Lane		Exhall, Coventry, West Midlands	4th
Harbury	Waterloo Fields		Harbury, Warwickshire	7th
Pershore	Mill Lane		Pershore, Worcestershire	9th
Redditch	Bromsgrove Road		Redditch, Worcestershire	8th
Stoke Old Boys	Albert Gale Field		Binley, Coventry, West Midlands	3rd
Tenbury	Penlu		Tenbury Wells, Worcestershire	Promoted from Midlands 5 West (North) (champions)

Locations of the 2017-18 Midlands 4 West (South) teams in Worcestershire
Locations of the 2017–18 Midlands 4 West (South) teams in Warwickshire, West Midlands & Leicestershire

== Teams 2016-17 ==
- Alcester
- Bromyard
- Claverdon
- Coventrians
- Coventry Welsh
- Harbury (relegated from Midlands 3 West (South))
- Keresley (promoted from Midlands 5 West (South))
- Kings Norton
- Pershore (relegated from Midlands 3 West (South))
- Redditch
- Stoke Old Boys

== Teams 2015-16 ==
- Alcester (promoted from Midlands 5 West (South))
- Atherstone
- Birmingham Civil Service (promoted from Midlands 5 West (South))
- Claverdon
- Coventrians
- Coventry Welsh
- Kings Norton
- Manor Park (relegated from Midlands 3 West (South))
- Redditch
- Stoke Old Boys
- Upton-on-Severn (relegated from Midlands 3 West (South))

== Teams 2014-15 ==
- Atherstone
- Claverdon
- Coventrians
- Coventry Welsh
- Evesham (relegated from Midlands 3 West (South))
- Five Ways Old Edwardians
- Kings Norton (relegated from Midlands 3 West (South))
- Redditch
- Rugby Lions (promoted from Midlands 5 West (South))
- Stoke Old Boys
- Warwickian (promoted from Midlands 5 West (South))

== Teams 2013-14 ==
- Alcester
- Atherstone
- Barton-under-Needwood
- Birmingham Civil Service
- Claverdon
- Coventrians
- Coventry Welsh
- Harbury
- Redditch (relegated from Midlands 3 West (South))
- Stoke Old Boys
- Woodrush (relegated from Midlands 3 West (South))

== Teams 2012–13 ==
- Alcester
- Atherstone
- Birmingham C.S.
- Claverdon
- Coventrians
- Coventry Welsh
- Harbury
- Keresley
- Manor Park
- Old Yardleians
- Warwickian

== Teams 2008–09 ==
- Copsewood
- Coventrians
- Coventry Welsh
- Dudley Wasps
- Evesham
- Harbury
- Keresley
- Manor Park
- Pinley
- Redditch
- Stoke Old Boys
- Worcester Students

Worcester Students withdrew from the league after failing to field 15 players regularly.

== Original teams ==
When this division was introduced in 2006 as Midlands 5 West (South), it contained the following teams:

- Alcester - transferred from Warwickshire 1 (7th)
- Bredon Star - transferred from North Midlands (South) 1 (6th)
- Coventry Technical - promoted from Warwickshire 2 (champions)
- Coventry Welsh - transferred from Warwickshire 1 (4th)
- Harbury - relegated from Midlands 4 West (South) (10th)
- Rugby St Andrews - transferred from Warwickshire 1 (5th)
- Southam - transferred from Warwickshire 1 (3rd)
- Stoke Old Boys - transferred from Warwickshire 1 (6th)
- Upton-upon-Severn - transferred from North Midlands (South) 1 (runners up)
- Woodrush - transferred from North Midlands (South) 1 (5th)

== Midlands 4 West (South) Honours ==
=== Midlands 5 West (South) (2006–2009) ===
League restructuring ahead of the 2006–07 season saw the introduction of Midlands 5 West (South) at tier 9 to replace the discontinued North Midlands 1 and Warwickshire 1 leagues. Promotion was to Midlands 4 West (South) and relegation to Midlands 6 West (South-East) or Midlands 6 West (South-West).

Midlands 5 West (South)
Season	No of teams	Champions	Runners–up	Relegated teams	Reference
2006–07	10	Woodrush	Southam	Coventry Technical, Bredon Star, Stoke Old Boys	
2007–08	10	Rugby St Andrews	Upton-on-Severn	Tenbury, Alcester	
2008–09	10	Redditch	Harbury	Copsewood, Coventrians	
Green backgrounds are promotion places.

=== Midlands 4 West (South) (2009–present) ===
Further league restructuring by the RFU meant that Midlands 5 West (North) and Midlands 5 West (South) were renamed as Midlands 4 West (North) and Midlands 4 West (South), with both leagues remaining at tier 9. Promotion was now to Midlands 3 West (South) (formerly Midlands 4 West (South)) and relegation to Midlands 5 West (South) (formerly two regional divisions known as Midlands 6 West (South-East) and Midlands 6 West (South-West)).

Midlands 4 West (South)
Season	No of teams	Champions	Runners–up	Relegated teams	Reference
2009–10	10	Evesham	Coventry Welsh	Dudley Wasps (Note: Although they finished 8th and outside of the relegation zone, Dudley Wasps would drop out of the division to join the North Midlands Reserve League - Division 1.)	
2010–11	11	Pinley	Keresley	Stoke Old Boys, Trinity Guild	
2011–12	11	Old Wheatleyans	Ledbury	Rugby Welsh, Birmingham Exiles	
2012–13	11	Old Yardleians	Manor Park	Keresley, Warwickian	
2013–14	10	Woodrush	Harbury	Alcester	
2014–15	10	Rugby Lions	Evesham	Five Ways Old Edwardians	
2015–16	10	Manor Park	Upton-on-Severn	Birmingham Civil Service	
2016–17	11	Bromyard	Alcester	Kings Norton, Keresley	
2017–18	11	Stoke Old Boys	Coventry Welsh	Tenbury, Birmingham Civil Service	
2018–19	11	Burbage	Bedworth	Redditch, Greyhound	
2019–20	11	Tenbury	Bromyard	Kings Norton	
2020–21	11				
Green backgrounds are promotion places.

== Number of league titles ==
- Woodrush (2)
- Evesham (1)
- Bromyard (1)
- Burbage (1)
- Manor Park (1)
- Old Yardleians (1)
- Old Wheatleyans (1)
- Pinley (1)
- Redditch (1)
- Rugby Lions (1)
- Rugby St Andrews (1)
- Stoke Old Boys (1)
- Tenbury (1)

== See also ==
- Midlands RFU
- North Midlands RFU
- Warwickshire RFU
- English rugby union system
- Rugby union in England
