= Midlands 6 West (SE) =

English rugby union league

English Rugby Union Midland Division - Midlands 5 West (SE) is an English Rugby Union League.

Midlands 6 West (SW) is made up of teams from around the East Midlands of England who play home and away matches throughout a winter season. As with many low level they are often subject to re-structure.

Promoted teams move up to Midlands 5 West (South).

== Teams 2008-2009 ==
- Alcester RUFC
- Atherstone RUFC
- Coventry Saracens RUFC
- Coventry Technical RUFC
- Old Wheatleyans RUFC
- Rugby Welsh RUFC
- Trinity Guild RUFC
- Warwickian RUFC
- Wellesbourne RUFC

== Teams 2007-2008 ==
- Atherstone RUFC
- Coventrians RUFC
- Coventry Saracens RUFC
- Coventry Technical RUFC
- Old Wheatleyans RUFC
- Rugby Welsh RUFC
- Standard RUFC
- Stoke Old Boys RUFC
- Trinity Guild RUFC

== See also ==
- English rugby union system
