= Midlands 5 West (South) =

Level 10 English Rugby Union league

Counties 4 Midlands West (South)
- Current season or competition: 2022-23 Counties 4 Midlands West (South)
- Sport: Rugby union
- Instituted: 2006; 20 years ago (as Midlands 6 West (South-East & South-West)
- Number of teams: 11
- Country: England
- Most titles: Birmingham Exiles, Rugby Welsh, Stoke Old Boys (2 titles)
- Website: England RFU

Counties 4 Midlands West (South West) / (South East) (formerly Midlands 5 West (South)) are level 10 English Rugby Union leagues and level 5 of the Midlands League, made up of teams from the West Midlands region including clubs from parts of Birmingham and the West Midlands, Herefordshire, Shropshire, Staffordshire, Warwickshire, Worcestershire and even (on occasion) Cheshire and Oxfordshire, with home and away matches played throughout the season. Each year some of the clubs in this division also take part in the RFU Junior Vase - a level 9-12 national competition.

Formed in 2006 originally the league was divided into two regional divisions – Midlands 6 South-East and South-West – but was merged into a single division for the 2010–11 season. In its present state promoted teams typically move up to either Midlands 4 West (North) or Midlands 4 West (South) with there being no relegation as it is the basement division for Midlands rugby. There was also another regional tier 5 Midlands league - Midlands 5 West (North) - but this league was discontinued at the end of the 2018–19 season, with most teams transferred into a new-look Midlands 5 West (South). Further restructuring followed in the wake of the RFU's Adult Competition Review, from season 2022-23 it has been known as Counties 4 Midlands West (South).

== 2026-27 ==
Ahead of the new season the South division was redesignated South West and the East division redesignated South East.

=== South West ===
Departing were Kings Norton and Worcester II both promoted to Counties 3 Midlands West (South).

Team	Ground	Capacity	City/Area	Previous season
Alcester II	Birmingham Road		Alcester, Warwickshire	Level transfer from Counties 4 Midlands West (East) (6th)
Bishop's Castle & Onny Valley	Bishop's Castle Community College		Bishop's Castle, Shropshire	Relegated from Counties 3 Midlands West (South)
Bromsgrove III	Finstall Park		Bromsgrove, Worcestershire	8th
Bromyard II	Clive Richards Sports Ground		Bromyard, Herefordshire	Promoted from North Midlands Merit
Chaddesley Corbett	Fox Lane		Chaddesley Corbett, Worcestershire	5th
Malvern II	Spring Lane		Malvern, Worcestershire	3rd
Old Halesonians II	Wassell Grove		Hagley, Stourbridge, Worcestershire	6th
Redditch	Bromsgrove Road		Redditch, Worcestershire	9th
Stourport	Walshes Meadow		Stourport-on-Severn, Worcestershire	4th
Tenbury Wells	Penlu Sports Club		Tenbury Wells, Worcestershire	7th

Locations of the 2026-27 Counties 4 Midlands West (SW) teams in Worcestershire, Herefordshire & Shropshire

=== South East ===
Departing were champions Shipston-on-Stour II were promoted to Counties 3 Midlands West (East) while runners-up Newbold on Avon II were promoted to Counties 3 Midlands East (South South) and third place Camp Hill II were promoted to Counties 3 Midlands West (South).

Also leaving on a level transfer to Counties 4 Midlands West (South West) were Alcester II (6th).

Old Saltleians II (8th) did not return for the new season.

Originally Old Edwardians II were scheduled to compete in the league, however a week before the new season started Old Edwardians withdrew from Regional 2 West Midlands due to "unforeseen circumstances" and so instead the club's 1XV took the place of the reserve side in this league.

Team	Ground	Capacity	City/Area	Previous season
Birmingham Exiles	Old Damson Lane		Elmdon, West Midlands	10th
Coventrians	The Black Pad		Holbrooks, Coventry, West Midlands	9th
Edwardians	Memorial Ground		Solihull, West Midlands	Reallocated from Regional 2 West Midlands
Harbury II	Waterloo Fields		Harbury, Warwickshire	4th
Manor Park II	Griff & Coton		Nuneaton, Warwickshire	Promoted from Warwickshire 2 merit league
Nuneaton II	Liberty Way		Nuneaton, Warwickshire	Relegated from Counties 3 Midlands West (East)
Old Leamingtonians II	The Crofts		Blackdown, Warwickshire	5th
Silhillians II	The Memorial Ground		Solihull, West Midlands	7th
Trinity Guild	Rowley Road		Baginton, Warwickshire	11th

Locations of the 2026-27 Counties 4 Midlands West (SE) teams

== 2025-26 ==
Ahead of the new season an East division was included for the first time with teams level transferred from the South and new sides added.

== South ==
Departing were Bishop's Castle & Onny Valley (champions), Evesham II (runners up) and Droitwich II (4th), all promoted to Counties 3 Midlands West (South) while Keresley (3rd) were promoted to Counties 3 Midlands West (East).

Also leaving on a level transfer to the new East division were Birmingham Exiles (9th), Old Leamingtonians II (8th) and Trinity Guild (12th).

Five Ways Old Edwardians (10th in 2024-25) did not return for the new season.

Kidderminster Carolians II started but subsequently withdrew from the league leaving ten sides to complete the outstanding fixtures.

Team	Ground	Capacity	City/Area	Previous season
Bromsgrove III	Finstall Park		Bromsgrove, Worcestershire	New entry
Chaddesley Corbett	Fox Lane		Chaddesley Corbett, Worcestershire	New entry
Kings Norton	Hopwood Park		Hopwood, Worcestershire	Relegated from Counties 3 Midlands West (South)
Malvern II	Spring Lane		Malvern, Worcestershire	Relegated from Counties 3 Midlands West (South)
Old Halesonians II	Wassell Grove		Hagley, Stourbridge, Worcestershire	7th
Redditch	Bromsgrove Road		Redditch, Worcestershire	11th
Stourbridge III	Stourton Park		Stourbridge, West Midlands	New entry
Stourport	Walshes Meadow		Stourport-on-Severn, Worcestershire	5th
Tenbury Wells	Penlu Sports Club		Tenbury Wells, Worcestershire	New entry
Worcester II	Offerton Lane		Worcester, Worcestershire	Relegated from Counties 3 Midlands West (South)

Locations of the 2025-26 Counties 4 Midlands West (South) teams in Worcestershire

== East ==
Team	Ground	Capacity	City/Area	Previous season
Alcester II	Birmingham Road		Alcester, Warwickshire	New entry
Birmingham Exiles	Old Damson Lane		Elmdon, West Midlands	Level transfer from Counties 4 Midlands West (South) (9th)
Camp Hill II	The Shrine		Shirley, Solihull, West Midlands	New entry
Coventrians	The Black Pad		Holbrooks, Coventry, West Midlands	Re-entry
Harbury II	Waterloo Fields		Harbury, Warwickshire	New entry
Newbold on Avon II	Parkfield Road		Newbold-on-Avon, Warwickshire	New entry
Old Leamingtonians II	The Crofts		Blackdown, Warwickshire	Level transfer from Counties 4 Midlands West (South) (8th)
Old Saltleians II	Watton Lane		Water Orton, Warwickshire	Relegated from Counties 3 Midlands West (East) (11th)
Shipston-on-Stour II	Mayo Road	600	Shipston-on-Stour, Warwickshire	New entry
Silhillians II	The Memorial Ground		Solihull, West Midlands	New entry
Stratford-upon-Avon II	Loxley Road		Stratford-upon-Avon, Warwickshire	New entry
Trinity Guild	Rowley Road		Baginton, Warwickshire	Level transfer from Counties 4 Midlands West (South) (12th)

Locations of the 2025-26 Counties 4 Midlands West (East) teams

== 2024-25 ==
Departing were Upton-upon-Severn and Malvern II, both promoted to Counties 3 Midlands West (South). Warley (4th) left on a level transfer to Counties 4 Midlands West (North).

Joining were Old Leamingtonians II, Kidderminster Carolians II and Trinity Guild.

Team	Ground	Capacity	City/Area	Previous season
Birmingham Exiles	Old Damson Lane		Elmdon, West Midlands	5th
Bishop's Castle & Onny Valley	Bishop's Castle Community College		Bishop's Castle, Shropshire	8th
Droitwich II	Glyn Mitchell Memorial Ground	3,000	Droitwich, Worcestershire	3rd
Evesham II	Lower Albert Road		Evesham, Worcestershire	10th
Five Ways Old Edwardians	Ash Lane		Hopwood, Worcestershire	12th
Keresley	John E. Radford Fields		Corley, Warwickshire	6th
Kidderminster Carolians II	Marlpool Lane		Kidderminster, Worcestershire	New entry
Old Halesonians II	Wassell Grove		Hagley, Stourbridge, Worcestershire	7th
Old Leamingtonians II	The Crofts		Blackdown, Warwickshire	Relegated from Counties 3 Midlands West (South) (12th)
Redditch	Bromsgrove Road		Redditch, Worcestershire	9th
Stourport	Walshes Meadow		Stourport-on-Severn, Worcestershire	11th
Trinity Guild	Rowley Road		Baginton, Warwickshire	Re-entry

Locations of the 2024-25 Counties 4 Midlands West (South) teams
Locations of the 2024-25 Counties 4 Midlands West (South) teams in Worcestershire

== 2023-24 ==
Departing were Hereford II and Worcester II, both promoted to Counties 3 Midlands West (South).

Joining were Upton-on-Severn, Birmingham Exiles, Warley and Old Halesonians II.

With two leaving and four joining the league was restored to twelve clubs from ten.

Team	Ground	Capacity	City/Area	Previous season
Birmingham Exiles	Old Damson Lane		Elmdon, West Midlands	Relegated from Counties 3 Midlands West (South) (10th)
Bishop's Castle & Onny Valley	Bishop's Castle Community College		Bishop's Castle, Shropshire	8th
Droitwich II	Glyn Mitchell Memorial Ground	3,000	Droitwich, Worcestershire	6th
Evesham II	Lower Albert Road		Evesham, Worcestershire	10th
Five Ways Old Edwardians	Ash Lane		Hopwood, Worcestershire	7th
Keresley	John E. Radford Fields		Corley, Warwickshire	5th
Malvern II	Spring Lane		Malvern, Worcestershire	4th
Old Halesonians II	Wassell Grove		Hagley, Stourbridge, Worcestershire	New entry
Redditch	Bromsgrove Road		Redditch, Worcestershire	9th
Stourport	Walshes Meadow		Stourport-on-Severn, Worcestershire	3rd
Upton-upon-Severn	Banwell Park		Upton-upon-Severn, Worcestershire	Relegated from Counties 3 Midlands West (South) (11th)
Warley	Tatbank Road		Oldbury, West Midlands	Relegated from Counties 3 Midlands West (North) (10th)

Locations of the 2023-24 Counties 4 Midlands West (South) teams
Locations of the 2023-24 Counties 4 Midlands West (South) teams in Worcestershire

== 2022-23 ==
This was the first season following the RFU Adult Competition Review with the league adopting its new name of Counties 4 Midlands West (South).

Departing were Birmingham & Solihull, Cannock and Greyhound, all promoted. Leaving on a level transfer to Counties 4 Midlands West (North) were Stone (5th), Bloxwich (7th), St Leonards (8th) and Atherstone (11th).

Joining were Hereford II, Worcester II, Malvern II, Evesham and Droitwich II.

With seven leaving and five joining the league was reduced in size from twelve clubs to ten.

Team	Ground	Capacity	City/Area	Previous season
Bishop's Castle & Onny Valley	Bishop's Castle Community College		Bishop's Castle, Shropshire	9th
Droitwich II	Glyn Mitchell Memorial Ground	3,000	Droitwich, Worcestershire	New entry
Evesham II	Lower Albert Road		Evesham, Worcestershire	New entry
Five Ways Old Edwardians	Ash Lane		Hopwood, Worcestershire	12th
Hereford II	Wyeside		Hereford, Herefordshire	New entry
Keresley	John E. Radford Fields		Corley, Warwickshire	10th
Malvern II	Spring Lane		Malvern, Worcestershire	New entry
Redditch	Bromsgrove Road		Redditch, Worcestershire	6th
Stourport	Walshes Meadow		Stourport-on-Severn, Worcestershire	4th
Worcester II	Offerton Lane		Worcester, Worcestershire	New entry

Locations of the 2022-23 Counties 4 Midlands West (South) teams
Locations of the 2022-23 Counties 4 Midlands West (South) teams

== 2021–22 ==
Dixonians, who finished 11th in 2019-20, did not return for the current season.

Team	Ground	Capacity	City/Area	Previous season
Atherstone	Atherstone Town Cricket Club		Atherstone, Warwickshire	6th
Birmingham & Solihull	Portway		Portway, Birmingham, West Midlands	Promoted from Greater Birmingham Merit League
Bishop's Castle & Onny Valley	Bishop's Castle Community College		Bishop's Castle, Shropshire	10th
Bloxwich	Stafford Road Sports Club		Bloxwich, Walsall, West Midlands	8th
Cannock	Morgan Ground		Huntington, Cannock Chase, Staffordshire	Relegated from Midlands 4 West (North) (12th)
Five Ways Old Edwardians	Ash Lane		Hopwood, Worcestershire	5th
Greyhound	Hereford City Sports Club		Hereford, Herefordshire	9th
Keresley	John E. Radford Fields		Corley, Warwickshire	7th
Redditch	Bromsgrove Road		Redditch, Worcestershire	3rd
St Leonards	Universal Sports and Social Club		Stafford, Staffordshire	Promoted from Staffordshire Merit Table Division 1
Stone	Stone Hockey Club		Aston By Stone, Staffordshire	Promoted from Staffordshire Merit Table Division 1
Stourport	Walshes Meadow		Stourport-on-Severn, Worcestershire	4th

Locations of the 2021–22 Midlands 5 West (South) teams

== 2020–21 ==
Due to the COVID-19 pandemic, the 2020–21 season was cancelled.

== 2019–20 ==
Team	Ground	Capacity	City/Area	Previous season
Atherstone	Atherstone Town Cricket Club		Atherstone, Warwickshire	5th
Bishop's Castle & Onny Valley	Bishop's Castle Community College		Bishop's Castle, Shropshire	Transferred from Midlands 5 West (North) (3rd)
Bloxwich	Stafford Road Sports Club		Bloxwich, Walsall, West Midlands	Relegated from Midlands 4 WN (11th)
Chaddesley Corbett	Fox Lane		Chaddesley Corbett, Worcestershire	Transferred from Midlands 5 West (North) (5th)
Dixonians	Rowheath Park		Birmingham, West Midlands	Greater Birmingham Merit League (champions)
Five Ways Old Edwardians	Ash Lane		Hopwood, Worcestershire	Joined league
Greyhound	Hereford City Sports Club		Hereford, Herefordshire	Relegated from Midlands 4 WS (10th)
Keresley	John E. Radford Fields		Corley, Warwickshire	4th
Redditch	Bromsgrove Road		Redditch, Worcestershire	Relegated from Midlands 4 WS (11th)
Rugby Welsh	Alwyn Road		Rugby, Warwickshire	3rd
Stourport	Walshes Meadow		Stourport-on-Severn, Worcestershire	Transferred from Midlands 5 West (North) (8th)

Locations of the 2019–20 Midlands 5 West (South) teams
Locations of the 2019–20 Midlands 5 West (South) teams in Worcestershire

== 2018–19 ==
Team	Ground	Capacity	City/Area	Previous season
Atherstone	Atherstone Town Cricket Club		Atherstone, Warwickshire	4th
Birmingham Civil Service	Land Rover Social Club		Solihull, West Midlands	Relegated from Midlands 4 West (South) (10th)
Birmingham Exiles	Old Damson Lane		Elmdon, West Midlands	6th
Keresley	John E. Radford Fields		Corley, Warwickshire	5th
Rugby Welsh	Alwyn Road		Rugby, Warwickshire	3rd

Locations of the 2018–19 Midlands 5 West (South) teams in Warwickshire

== 2017–18 ==
Team	Ground	Capacity	City/Area	Previous season
Aldridge	Bourne Vale		Aldridge, West Midlands	Transferred from Midlands 5 West (North) (4th)
Atherstone	Atherstone Town Cricket Club		Atherstone, Warwickshire	5th
Birmingham Exiles	Old Damson Lane		Elmdon, West Midlands	3rd
Keresley	John E. Radford Fields		Corley, Warwickshire	Relegated from Midlands 4 West (North) (10th)
Kings Norton	Hopgood Park		Hopwood, Worcestershire	Relegated from Midlands 4 West (North) (11th)
Rugby Welsh	Alwyn Road		Rugby, Warwickshire	4th
Trinity Guild	Rowley Road		Baginton, Warwickshire	6th

Locations of the 2017–18 Midlands 5 West (South) teams

== Teams 2016-17 ==
- Atherstone (relegated from Midlands 4 West (South))
- Birmingham Civil Service (relegated from Midlands 4 West (South))
- Birmingham Exiles
- Copsewood
- Rugby Welsh
- Trinity Guild
- Wellesbourne

== Teams 2015-16 ==
- Birmingham Exiles
- Copsewood
- Five Ways Old Edwardians (relegated from Midlands 4 West (South))
- Keresley
- Rugby Welsh
- Trinity Guild
- Wellesbourne

== Teams 2014-15 ==
- Alcester (relegated from Midlands 4 West (South))
- Birmingham Civil Service (relegated from Midlands 4 West (South))
- Birmingham Exiles
- Copsewood
- Coventry Technical
- Keresley
- Rugby Welsh
- Trinity Guild
- Wellesbourne

== Teams 2013-14 ==
- Birmingham Exiles
- Copsewood
- Coventry Technical
- Keresley
- Rugby Lions
- Rugby Welsh
- Trinity Guild
- Warwickian
- Wellesbourne

== Teams 2012–13 ==
- Birmingham Exiles
- Copsewood
- Coventry Technical
- Greyhound
- Rugby Welsh
- Stoke Old Boys
- Trinity Guild
- Wellesbourne

== Teams 2008–09 ==
- Copsewood
- Coventrians
- Coventry Welsh
- Dudley Wasps
- Evesham
- Harbury
- Keresley
- Manor Park
- Pinley
- Redditch
- Stoke Old Boys
- Worcester Students

Worcester Students withdrew from the league after failing to field 15 players regularly.

== Original teams ==
When this division was introduced in 2006 it was split into two separate divisions - Midlands 6 West (South-East) and Midlands 6 West (South-West) - containing the following teams:

Midlands 6 West (South-East)

- Atherstone - transferred from Warwickshire 2 (5th)
- Coventrians - transferred from Warwickshire 2 (runners up)
- Coventry Saracens - transferred from Warwickshire 2 (9th)
- Manor Park - transferred from Warwickshire 1 (9th)
- Old Wheatleyans - transferred from Warwickshire 2 (4th)
- Pinley - transferred from Warwickshire 1 (8th)
- Rugby Welsh - transferred from Warwickshire 2 (3rd)
- Standard - transferred from Warwickshire 2 (8th)
- Trinity Guild - transferred from Warwickshire 1 (10th)
- Warwickian - transferred from Warwickshire 2 (6th)

Midlands 6 West (South-West)

- Birmingham Civil Service - transferred from North Midlands (South) 2 (5th)
- Birmingham Exiles - transferred from North Midlands (South) 2 (8th)
- Bromyard - transferred from North Midlands (South) 2 (6th)
- Chaddesley Corbett - transferred from North Midlands (South) 2 (runners up)
- Claverdon - transferred from Warwickshire 2 (7th)
- Clee Hill - transferred from North Midlands (South) 2 (4th)
- Dudley Wasps (Note: Dudley Wasps were the 2nd XV of Dudley Kingswinford - now 3rd XV.) - transferred from North Midlands (South) 2 (3rd)
- Redditch - transferred from North Midlands (South) 1 (7th)
- Warley - relegated from Midlands 5 West (North) (8th)

== Midlands 5 West (South) honours ==
=== Midlands 6 West (South-East) / (South-West) (2006–2009) ===
The league was originally divided into two sub-divisions known as Midlands 6 West (South-East) and Midlands 6 West (South-West). These divisions were introduced along with their counterpart Midlands 6 West (North) at tier 10 to replace the discontinued North Midlands 2, Warwickshire 1 and Warwickshire 2 leagues. Promotion was to Midlands 5 West (South) and there was no relegation.

Midlands 5 West (South-East & South-West)
Season	No of Teams	Champions	Runners–up	Relegated Teams	League Name	Reference
2006–07	10	Pinley	Manor Park	No relegation (Note: Standard would drop out of the league for the following season.)	Midlands 6 West (South-East)	
2006–07	9	Dudley Wasps	Redditch	No relegation	Midlands 6 West (South-West)	
2007–08	9	Stoke Old Boys	Coventrians	No relegation	Midlands 6 West (South-East)	
2007–08	10	Redditch	Clee Hill	No relegation	Midlands 6 West (South-West)	
2008–09	9	Rugby Welsh	Alcester	No relegation	Midlands 6 West (South-East)	
2008–09	10	Birmingham Exiles	Warley	No relegation (Note: Highley would drop out of the league for the following season.)	Midlands 6 West (South-West)	
Green backgrounds are promotion places.

=== Midlands 5 West (South-East) / (South-West) (2009–2010) ===
Further league restructuring by the RFU meant that Midlands 6 West (South-East / South-West) and their counterpart Midlands 6 West (North) were renamed as Midlands 5 West (South-East / South-West) and Midlands 5 West (North), with all leagues remaining at tier 10. Promotion was now to Midlands 4 West (South) (formerly Midlands 5 West (South)) and there was no relegation.

Midlands 5 West (South-East & South-West)
Season	No of Teams	Champions	Runners–up	Relegated Teams	League Name	Reference
2009–10	9	Trinity Guild	Atherstone	No relegation	Midlands 5 West (South-East)	
2009–10	8	Clee Hill	Tenbury	No relegation	Midlands 5 West (South-West)	
Green backgrounds are promotion places.

=== Midlands 5 West (South) (2009–present) ===
Midlands 5 West (South-East / South West) were remerged into a single tier 10 division ahead of the 2010–11 season. Promotion continued to Midlands 4 West (South) and there was no relegation.

Midlands 5 West (South)
Season	No of Teams	Champions	Runners–up	Relegated Teams	Reference
2010–11	8	Claverdon	Old Wheatleyans	No relegation	
2011–12	7	Coventrians	Warwickian	No relegation	
2012–13	8	Stoke Old Boys	Greyhound	No relegation	
2013–14	9	Rugby Lions	Warwickian	No relegation	
2014–15	8	Birmingham Civil Service	Alcester	No relegation	
2015–16	7	Keresley	Five Ways Old Edwardians	No relegation	
2016–17	7	Burbage	Birmingham Civil Service	No relegation	
2017–18	7	Aldridge	Kings Norton	No relegation	
2018–19	5	Birmingham Exiles	Birmingham Civil Service	No relegation	
2019–20	11 (Note: The league expanded from 5 to 10 teams following the dissolution of Midlands 5 West (North) at the end of 2018–19 season.)	Rugby Welsh	Chaddesley Corbett	No relegation	
2020–21	11			No relegation	
Green backgrounds are promotion places.

== Promotion play-offs ==
Between 2007 and 2010 there was a promotion playoff between the runners-up of Midlands 5 West (South-East) and Midlands 5 West (South-West) for the third and final promotion place to Midlands 4 West (South), with the team with the superior league record having home advantage in the tie. The playoffs were dissolved at the end of the 2009-10 season when Midlands 5 West (South) became one division. By the end of the promotion play-offs the Midlands 5 West (South-East) teams won all four playoff games and the home team has also won promotion on all four occasions.

Midlands 5 West (South-East) v Midlands 5 West (South-West) promotion play-off results
Season	Home team	Score	Away team	Venue	Attendance
2006–07	Manor Park (SE)	25-22	Redditch (SW)	Heath End, Nuneaton, Warwickshire	
2007–08	Coventrians (E)	27-0	Clee Hill (SW)	The Black Pad, Holbrooks, Coventry, Warwickshire	
2008–09	Alchester (SE)	25-7	Warley (SW)	Fritwell Playing Fields, Fritwell, Oxfordshire	
2009–10	Atherstone (SE)	47-15	Tenbury (SW)	Atherstone Town Cricket Club, Atherstone, Warwickshire	
Green background is the promoted team. SE = Midlands 5 West (South-East) (formerly Midlands 6 West (South-East)) and SW = Midlands 5 West (South-West) (formerly Midlands 6 West (South-West))

== Number of league titles ==
- Birmingham Exiles (2) (Note: One of Birmingham Exiles titles was won when division was split into Midlands 6 West (South-East) and Midlands 6 West (South-West).)
- Rugby Welsh (2) (Note: One of Rugby Welsh's titles was won when division was split into Midlands 6 West (South-East) and Midlands 6 West (South-West).)
- Stoke Old Boys (2) (Note: One of Stoke Old Boys title was won when division was split into Midlands 6 West (South-East) and Midlands 6 West (South-West).)
- Aldridge (1)
- Birmingham Civil Service (1)
- Burbage (1)
- Claverdon (1)
- Clee Hill (1) (Note: Clee Hill's title was won when division was split into Midlands 5 West (South-East) and Midlands 5 West (South-West).)
- Coventrians (1)
- Dudley Wasps (1) (Note: Dudley Wasps title was won when division was split into Midlands 6 West (South-East) and Midlands 6 West (South-West).)
- Keresley (1)
- Pinley (1) (Note: Pinley's title was won when division was split into Midlands 6 West (South-East) and Midlands 6 West (South-West).)
- Redditch (1) (Note: Redditch's title was won when division was split into Midlands 6 West (South-East) and Midlands 6 West (South-West).)
- Rugby Lions (1)
- Trinity Guild (1) (Note: Trinity Guild's title was won when division was split into Midlands 5 West (South-East) and Midlands 5 West (South-West).)

== See also ==
- Midlands RFU
- North Midlands RFU
- Warwickshire RFU
- English rugby union system
- Rugby union in England
