= Warwickshire 1 =

English rugby union league (1987–2006)

- Current season or competition: 2005–06 Warwickshire 1
- Sport: Rugby union
- Instituted: 1987; 39 years ago
- Ceased: 2006; 20 years ago
- Country: England
- Holders: Spartans (Midlands) (1st title) (2005–06) (promoted to Midlands 4 West (South))
- Most titles: Harbury (2 titles)

Warwickshire 1 was a tier 9 English Rugby Union league with teams from Warwickshire taking part. Promoted teams moved up to Midlands 4 West (South) and relegated sides dropped to Warwickshire 2. Warwickshire 1 was cancelled at the end of the 2005–06 season with the majority of teams transferred into the newly introduced Midlands 5 West (South).

== Original teams ==
When league rugby began in 1987 this division contained the following teams:

- Atherstone
- Broadstreet
- Coventry Welsh
- Dunlop
- GEC Coventry (Note: GEC Coventry were the one of two rugby union sides that represented the General Electric Company - the other being GEC St Leonards. The clubs name has changed a number of times since 1987 - first to GPT (1996), then Marconi (1999) and finally Copsewood (2005).)
- Keresley
- Old Coventrians
- Old Laurentians
- Old Wheatleyans
- Rugby St Andrews
- Trinity Guild

== Warwickshire 1 honours ==
=== Warwickshire 1 (1987–1992) ===
The original Warwickshire 1 was a tier 8 league with promotion up to Staffordshire/Warwickshire and relegation to Warwickshire 2. At the end of the 1991–92 season the merging of all Staffordshire and Warwickshire leagues meant that Warwickshire 1 was discontinued for the years that these leagues were active (Note: The new format included four divisions; Staffordshire/Warwickshire 1, Staffordshire/Warwickshire 2, Staffordshire/Warwickshire 3 and Staffordshire/Warwickshire 4.).

Warwickshire 1
Season	No of teams	Champions	Runners–up	Relegated teams	Reference
1987–88	11	Keresley	Coventry Welsh	Old Laurentians, Atherstone	
1988–89	11	Coventry Welsh	Trinity Guild	Rugby St Andrews, GEC Coventry	
1989–90	11	Broadstreet	Trinity Guild	Manor Park	
1990–91	11	Kenilworth	Old Laurentians	Southam	
1991–92	11	Old Laurentians (Note: The restructuring of the Staffordshire & Warwickshire leagues meant that champions Old Laurentians were promoted two levels up to Midlands West 2. All other clubs in the division were transferred into the newly introduced Staffordshire/Warwickshire 2.)	Trinity Guild	No relegation	
Green backgrounds are promotion places.

=== Warwickshire (1996–2000) ===
Restructuring of the Staffordshire/Warwickshire leagues (Note: This restructuring saw the cancellation of Staffordshire/Warwickshire 2, Staffordshire/Warwickshire 3 and Staffordshire/Warwickshire 4 and the transfer of teams into the reintroduced regional Staffordshire and Warwickshire leagues.) ahead of the 1996–97 season saw the reintroduction of a single Warwickshire league, which along with its counterpart Staffordshire was a tier 9 league. Promotion was to Staffordshire/Warwickshire 1 and there was no relegation until the reintroduction of Warwickshire 2 at the end of the 1999–00 season.

Warwickshire
Season	No of teams	Champions	Runners–up	Relegated teams	Reference
1996–97	9	Claverdon	Ford	No relegation	
1997–98	10	Harbury	Atherstone	No relegation	
1998–99	10	Atherstone	Rugby St Andrews	No relegation	(Note: Mistakenly listed as Warwickshire 2 on the RFU website.)
1999–00	9	Rugby St Andrews (Note: Due to the cancellation of Staffordshire/Warwickshire 1 at the end of the season, there was no promotion.)	Old Wheatleyans	Multiple teams (Note: Due to the restructuring of the Staffordshire/Warwickshire leagues all teams in the division other than champions Rugby St Andrews were relegated into the reintroduced Warwickshire 2.)	(Note: Mistakenly listed as Warwickshire 2 on the RFU website.)
Green backgrounds are promotion places.

=== Warwickshire 1 (2000–2006) ===
The cancellation of Staffordshire/Warwickshire 1 would see Warwickshire become Warwickshire 1, remaining as a tier 9 league. Promotion was to Midlands 4 West (South) and relegation to Warwickshire 2 until that division was cancelled at the end of the 2003–04 season. At the end of the 2005–06 season Warwickshire 1 was cancelled and all teams transferred to the newly introduced Midlands 5 West (South) and Midlands 6 West (South-East) divisions.

Warwickshire 1
Season	No of teams	Champions	Runners–up	Relegated teams	Reference
2000–01	10	Earlsdon	Coventry Welsh	Pinley, Claverdon	
2001–02	10	Marconi	Shipston-on-Stour	Standard	
2002–03	10	Trinity Guild	Dunlop	Claverdon, Old Wheatleyans	
2003–04	8	Manor Park	Coventry Welsh	Stoke Old Boys, Pinley, Alcester	
2004–05	9	Harbury	Coventry Welsh	Old Wheatleyans, Coventry Technical	
2005–06	10	Spartans (Midlands) (Note: Champions Spartans (Midlands) were promoted into Midlands 4 West (South).)	Dunlop (Note: Runners up Dunlop were also promoted into Midlands 4 West (South). Clubs ranked 3rd to 7th - Southam, Coventry Welsh, Rugby St Andrews, Stoke Old Boys and Alcester were transferred into Midlands 5 West (South).)	No relegation (Note: The cancellation of the Warwickshire regional leagues meant that there was no relegation, although the bottom 3 sides - Pinley, Manor Park and Trinity Guild - were transferred into Midlands 6 West (South-East).)	
Green backgrounds are promotion places.

== Number of league titles ==
- Harbury (2) (Note: One of Harbury's title was won when league was single division known as Warwickshire.)
- Atherstone (1) (Note: Atherstone's title was won when league was single division known as Warwickshire.)
- Broadstreet (1)
- Claverdon (1) (Note: Claverdon's title was won when league was single division known as Warwickshire.)
- Coventry Welsh (1)
- Earlsdon (1)
- Kenilworth (1)
- Keresley (1)
- Manor Park (1)
- Marconi (1) (Note: Marconi are currently known as Copsewood RFC.)
- Old Laurentians (1)
- Rugby St Andrews (1) (Note: Rugby St Andrews title was won when league was single division known as Warwickshire.)
- Spartans (Midlands) (1)
- Trinity Guild (1)

== See also ==
- Warwickshire 2
- Warwickshire 3
- Midlands RFU
- Warwickshire RFU
- English rugby union system
- Rugby union in England
