= Midlands 3 West (South) =

Level 8 English Rugby Union league

Counties 2 Midlands West (East)
- Current season or competition: 2024-25 Counties 2 Midlands West (East)
- Sport: Rugby union
- Instituted: 1992; 34 years ago (as Midlands West 2)
- Number of teams: 12
- Country: England
- Most titles: Droitwich, Dunlop, Old Coventrians, Old Yardleians (2 titles)
- Website: England RFU

Counties 2 Midlands West (East) (formerly Midlands 3 West (South)) is a level 8 English Rugby Union league and level 3 of the Midlands League, made up of teams from the southern part of the West Midlands region including clubs from parts of Birmingham and the West Midlands, Herefordshire, Warwickshire, Worcestershire and sometimes Oxfordshire, with home and away matches played throughout the season. When this division began in 1992 it was known as Midlands West 2, until it was split into two regional divisions called Midlands 4 West (North) and Midlands 4 West (South) ahead of the 2000–01 season. Further restructuring of the Midlands leagues ahead of the 2009–10 season, led to it to adopt the name Midlands 3 West (South). Further restructuring followed in the wake of the RFU's Adult Competition Review, from season 2022-23 it was known, briefly as Counties 2 Midlands West (South), before the league was split East/West giving rise to its current name.

Promoted teams tend to move up to Counties 2 Midlands West (South) or Counties 2 Midlands West (North) depending on location. Relegated teams typically drop to Counties 3 Midlands West (South) or Counties 3 Midlands West (East) or occasionally to Counties 3 Midlands West (North). Each year all clubs in the division also take part in the RFU Senior Vase - a level 8 national competition.

== 2026-27 ==
Departing were champions Barkers Butts and runners-up Berkswell & Balsall both promoted to Counties 1 Midlands West (South) while Harborne (11th) and Coventry Welsh (12th) were relegated to Counties 3 Midlands West (South) and Counties 3 Midlands West (East) respectively.

Team	Ground	Capacity	City/Area	Previous season
Birmingham & Solihull	Portway	Capacity 5000	Birmingham, West Midlands	3rd
Bournville II	Avery Fields		Edgbaston, Birmingham, West Midlands	9th
Broadstreet 2XV	Ivor Preece Field	1,500 (250 seats)	Binley Woods, Coventry, West Midlands	Promoted from Counties 3 Midlands West (East)
Bromsgrove 2XV	Finstall Park		Bromsgrove, Worcestershire	4th
Claverdon	Ossetts Hole Ln		Claverdon, Warwickshire	7th
Droitwich	Glyn Mitchell Memorial Ground	3,000	Droitwich, Worcestershire	Relegated from Counties 1 Midlands West (South)
Harbury	Waterloo Fields		Harbury, Warwickshire	5th
Lutterworth II	Ashby Lane		Lutterworth, Leicestershire	8th
Southam	The Rugby Field		Southam, Warwickshire	6th
Tamworth	Wigginton Park		Tamworth, Staffordshire	Relegated from Counties 1 Midlands West (North)
Upton-upon-Severn	Banwell Park		Upton-upon-Severn, Worcestershire	10th
Woodrush	Icknield Street		Forhill, Worcestershire	Promoted from Counties 3 Midlands West (South)

Locations of the 2026-27 Counties 2 Midlands West (East) teams in West Midlands & Worcestershire
Locations of the 2026-27 Counties 2 Midlands West (East) teams in Coventry, Staffordshire, Warwickshire & Leicestershire

== 2025-26 ==
Departing were Aston Old Edwardians promoted to Counties 1 Midlands West (North) and Earlsdon promoted to Counties 1 Midlands West (South) as champions and runners-up respectively. Meanwhile Broadstreet 2XV (9th), Old Wheatleyans (10th) and Stoke Old Boys (11th) were relegated to Counties 3 Midlands West (East). Also leaving were Coalville who moved on a level transfer to Counties 2 Midlands East (North).

=== Participating teams & locations ===
Team	Ground	Capacity	City/Area	Previous season
Barkers Butts	Bob Coward Memorial Ground		Allesley, Coventry, West Midlands	Relegated from Counties 1 Midlands West (South)
Berkswell & Balsall	Honiley Road		Balsall Common, Warwickshire	Relegated from Counties 1 Midlands West (South)
Birmingham & Solihull	Portway	Capacity 5000	Birmingham, West Midlands	4th
Bournville II	Avery Fields		Edgbaston, Birmingham, West Midlands	Promoted from Counties 3 Midlands West (South)
Bromsgrove 2XV	Finstall Park		Bromsgrove, Worcestershire	Relegated from Counties 1 Midlands West (South)
Claverdon	Ossetts Hole Ln		Claverdon, Warwickshire	7th
Coventry Welsh	Burbages Lane		Exhall, Coventry, West Midlands	8th
Harborne	Metchley Park		Birmingham, West Midlands	Level transfer from Counties 2 Midlands West (West) (8th)
Harbury	Waterloo Fields		Harbury, Warwickshire	5th
Lutterworth II	Ashby Lane		Lutterworth, Leicestershire	Promoted from Counties 3 Midlands West (East)
Southam	The Rugby Field		Southam, Warwickshire	6th
Upton-upon-Severn	Banwell Park		Upton-upon-Severn, Worcestershire	Promoted from Counties 3 Midlands West (South)

Locations of the 2025-26 Counties 2 Midlands West (East) teams in West Midlands & Worcestershire
Locations of the 2025-26 Counties 2 Midlands West (East) teams in Coventry, Warwickshire & Leicestershire

== 2024-25 ==
Departing were Barkers Butts promoted to Counties 1 Midlands West (South) and Veseyans promoted to Counties 1 Midlands West (North). Uttoxeter and Woodrush were relegated. Walsall II (8th) moved on a level transfer to Counties 2 Midlands West (West)

Joining were Aston Old Edwardians, Broadstreet 2XV, Earlsdon, Harbury and Stoke Old Boys.

In November 2024 Coventrians (3rd in 2023-24) withdrew from the league stating "decision was taken to protect the safety and well being of our players following a significant loss of playing personnel for various reasons including injury and retirement." The league will therefore be completed with eleven sides.

=== Participating teams & locations ===
Team	Ground	Capacity	City/Area	Previous season
Aston Old Edwardians	Sunnybank Avenue		Kingstanding, Birmingham, West Midlands	Promoted from Counties 3 Midlands West (North) (Champions)
Birmingham & Solihull	Portway		Portway, Birmingham, West Midlands	5th
Broadstreet 2XV	Ivor Preece Field	1,500 (250 seats)	Binley Woods, Coventry, West Midlands	Relegated from Counties 1 Midlands West (South)
Claverdon	Ossetts Hole Ln		Claverdon, Warwickshire	6th
Coalville	Memorial Ground		Coalville, Leicestershire	7th
Coventry Welsh	Burbages Lane		Exhall, Coventry, West Midlands	4th
Earlsdon	Mitchell Avenue		Canley, Coventry, West Midlands	Relegated from Counties 1 Midlands West (South)
Harbury	Waterloo Fields		Harbury, Warwickshire	Promoted from Counties 3 Midlands West (South) (Champions)
Old Wheatleyans	Stade Wheats		Coundon, Coventry, West Midlands	10th
Southam	The Rugby Field		Southam, Warwickshire	9th
Stoke Old Boys	Albert Gale Field		Binley, Coventry, West Midlands	Promoted from Counties 3 Midlands West (South) (Runners-up)

Locations of the 2024-25 Counties 2 Midlands West (East) teams
Locations of the 2024-25 Counties 2 Midlands West (East) teams in Birmingham & Coventry

== 2023-24 ==
The league name changed from Counties 2 Midlands West (South) to Counties 2 Midlands West (East) with a corresponding adjustment in the make up of the competing sides.

Departing were Alcester and Manor Park, both promoted to Counties 1 Midlands West (South); Pinley (12th) and Kenilworth II (11th) were both relegated to Counties 3 Midlands West (South); Rugby St Andrews (10th) were relegated to Counties 3 Midlands East (South); Burbage (9th) withdrew from league competition. Also leaving, but on a level transfer, were Bromyard (6th) and Tenbury (4th) to Counties 2 Midlands West (West).

Joining were Barkers Butts, Birmingham & Solihull, Coalville, Coventry Welsh, Old Coventrians, Uttoxeter, Veseyans and Walsall II.

=== Participating teams & locations ===
Team	Ground	Capacity	City/Area	Previous season
Barkers Butts	Bob Coward Memorial Ground		Allesley, Coventry, West Midlands	Relegated from Counties 1 Midlands West (South)
Birmingham & Solihull	Portway		Portway, Birmingham, West Midlands	Promoted from Counties 3 Midlands West (South) (Champions)
Claverdon	Stadium of Dreams		Claverdon, Warwickshire	7th
Coalville	Memorial Ground		Coalville, Leicestershire	Relegated from Counties 1 Midlands East (North)
Coventrians	The Black Pad		Holbrooks, Coventry, West Midlands	Promoted from Counties 3 Midlands West (South) (Runners-up)
Coventry Welsh	Burbages Lane		Exhall, Coventry, West Midlands	Relegated from Counties 1 Midlands West (South)
Old Wheatleyans	Stade Wheats		Coundon, Coventry, West Midlands	3rd
Southam	The Rugby Field		Southam, Warwickshire	5th
Uttoxeter	Oldfields Sports & Social Club	2,000	Uttoxeter, Staffordshire	Relegated from Counties 1 Midlands West (North)
Veseyans	Memorial Ground		Walsall, West Midlands	Level transfer from Counties 2 Midlands West (North) (3rd)
Walsall II	Broadway Ground	1,150 (150 stand)	Walsall, West Midlands	New entry
Woodrush	Icknield Street		Forhill, Worcestershire	8th

Locations of the 2023-24 Counties 2 Midlands West (East) teams
Locations of the 2023-24 Counties 2 Midlands West (East) teams in Birmingham & Coventry

== 2022-23 ==
This was the first season following the RFU Adult Competition Review with the league adopting its new name of Counties 2 Midlands West (South).

Departing were Ledbury, Old Leamingtonians and Coventry Welsh all promoted to Counties 2 Midlands West (South). Stoke Old Boys were relegated.

Joining were Claverdon, Old Wheatleyans, Pinley and Kenilworth II.

=== Participating teams & locations ===
Team	Ground	Capacity	City/Area	Previous season
Alcester	Birmingham Road		Alcester, Warwickshire	4th
Bromyard	Clive Richards Sports Ground		Bromyard, Herefordshire	11th
Burbage	Recreation Ground		Burbage, Leicestershire	7th
Claverdon	Stadium of Dreams		Claverdon, Warwickshire	Promoted from Midlands 4 WS
Kenilworth II	Glasshouse Lane		Kenilworth, Warwickshire	New entry
Manor Park	Griff & Coton		Nuneaton, Warwickshire	5th
Old Wheatleyans	Stade Wheats		Coundon, Coventry, West Midlands	Promoted from Midlands 4 WS
Pinley	Wyken Croft		Wyken, Coventry, West Midlands	Relegated from Midlands 2 WS (12th)
Rugby St Andrews	Ashlawn Road		Rugby, Warwickshire	6th
Southam	The Rugby Field		Southam, Warwickshire	8th
Tenbury	Penlu		Tenbury Wells, Worcestershire	9th
Woodrush	Icknield Street		Forhill, Worcestershire	10th

Locations of the 2022-23 Counties 2 Midlands West (South) teams in Herefordshire, Leicestershire & Worcestershire
Locations of the 2022-23 Counties 2 Midlands West (South) teams in Coventry & Warwickshire

== 2021–22 ==
=== Participating teams & locations ===
Team	Ground	Capacity	City/Area	Previous season
Alcester	Birmingham Road		Alcester, Warwickshire	10th
Bromyard	Clive Richards Sports Ground		Bromyard, Herefordshire	Promoted from Midlands 4 WS (runners-up)
Burbage	Recreation Ground		Burbage, Leicestershire	11th
Coventry Welsh	Burbages Lane		Exhall, Coventry, West Midlands	4th
Ledbury	Ross Road		Ledbury, Herefordshire	6th
Manor Park	Griff & Coton		Nuneaton, Warwickshire	8th
Old Leamingtonians	The Crofts		Blackdown, Warwickshire	7th
Rugby St Andrews	Ashlawn Road		Rugby, Warwickshire	3rd
Southam	The Rugby Field		Southam, Warwickshire	Relegated from Midlands 2 WS (12th)
Stoke Old Boys	Albert Gale Field		Binley, Coventry, West Midlands	9th
Tenbury	Penlu		Tenbury Wells, Worcestershire	Promoted from Midlands 4 WS (champions)
Woodrush	Icknield Street		Forhill, Worcestershire	5th

Locations of the 2021–22 Midlands 3 West (South) teams in Herefordshire & Worcestershire
Locations of the 2021-22 Midlands 3 West (South) teams in Warwickshire, West Midlands, Worcestershire & Leicestershire

== 2020–21 ==
Due to the COVID-19 pandemic, the 2020–21 season was cancelled.

== 2019–20 ==
=== Participating teams & locations ===
Team	Ground	Capacity	City/Area	Previous season
Alcester	Birmingham Road		Alcester, Warwickshire	8th
Bedworth	Nicholas Chamberlaine School		Bedworth, Warwickshire	Promoted from Midlands 4 WS (runners up)
Berkswell & Balsall	Honiley Road		Balsall Common, Warwickshire	5th
Burbage	Recreation Ground		Burbage, Leicestershire	Promoted from Midlands 4 WS (champions)
Coventry Welsh	Burbages Lane		Exhall, Coventry, West Midlands	9th
Ledbury	Ross Road		Ledbury, Herefordshire	4th
Manor Park	Griff & Coton		Nuneaton, Warwickshire	6th
Old Coventrians	Tile Hill Lane		Tile Hill, Coventry, West Midlands	Relegated from Midlands 2 WS (11th)
Old Leamingtonians	The Crofts		Blackdown, Warwickshire	3rd
Rugby St Andrews	Ashlawn Road		Rugby, Warwickshire	Relegated from Midlands 2 WS (12th)
Stoke Old Boys	Albert Gale Field		Binley, Coventry, West Midlands	10th
Woodrush	Icknield Street		Forhill, Worcestershire	7th

Locations of the 2019–20 Midlands 3 West (South) teams in Herefordshire
Locations of the 2019–20 Midlands 3 West (South) teams in Warwickshire, West Midlands, Worcestershire & Leicestershire

== 2018–19 ==
=== Participating teams & locations ===
Team	Ground	Capacity	City/Area	Previous season
Alcester	Birmingham Road		Alcester, Warwickshire	5th
Berkswell & Balsall	Honiley Road		Balsall Common, Warwickshire	Relegated from Midlands 2 West (South) (11th)
Coventry Welsh	Burbages Lane		Exhall, Coventry, West Midlands	Promoted from Midlands 4 West (South) (runners up)
Ledbury	Ross Road		Ledbury, Herefordshire	6th
Manor Park	Griff & Coton		Nuneaton, Warwickshire	9th
Old Leamingtonians	The Crofts		Blackdown, Warwickshire	4th
Old Yardleians	Tilehouse Lane		Shirley, Solihull, West Midlands	Relegated from Midlands 2 West (South) (12th)
Pinley	Wyken Croft		Wyken, Coventry, West Midlands	Relegated from Midlands 2 East (South) (12th)
Shipston-on-Stour	Mayo Road	600	Shipston-on-Stour, Warwickshire	3rd
Stoke Old Boys	Albert Gale Field		Binley, Coventry, West Midlands	Promoted from Midlands 4 West (South) (champions)
Upton-upon-Severn	The Sports Field		Upton-upon-Severn, Worcestershire	10th
Woodrush	Icknield Street		Forhill, Worcestershire	8th

Locations of the 2018–19 Midlands 3 West (South) teams in Herefordshire
Locations of the 2018–19 Midlands 3 West (South) teams in Warwickshire, Worcestershire & West Midlands

== 2017–18 ==
=== Participating teams & locations ===
Team	Ground	Capacity	City/Area	Previous season
Alcester	Birmingham Road		Alcester, Warwickshire	Promoted from Midlands 4 West (South) (runners up)
Bromyard	Clive Richards Sports Ground		Bromyard, Herefordshire	Promoted from Midlands 4 West (South) (champions)
Dunlop	Dunlop Sports & Social Club		Holbrooks, Coventry, West Midlands	Relegated from Midlands 2 West (South) (12th)
Ledbury	Ross Road		Ledbury, Herefordshire	3rd
Manor Park	Griff & Coton		Nuneaton, Warwickshire	8th
Old Coventrians	Tile Hill Lane		Tile Hill, Coventry, West Midlands	5th
Old Leamingtonians	The Crofts		Blackdown, Warwickshire	7th
Old Wheatleyans	Stade Wheats		Coundon, Coventry, West Midlands	9th
Rugby St Andrews	Ashlawn Road		Rugby, Warwickshire	6th
Shipston-on-Stour	Mayo Road	600	Shipston-on-Stour, Warwickshire	4th
Upton-upon-Severn	The Sports Field		Upton-upon-Severn, Worcestershire	10th
Woodrush	Icknield Street		Forhill, Worcestershire	11th

Locations of the 2017-18 Midlands 3 West (South) teams in Herefordshire & Worcestershire
Locations of the 2017–18 Midlands 3 West (South) teams

== Teams 2016-17 ==
- Bedworth (relegated from Midlands 2 West (South))
- Droitwich (relegated from Midlands 2 West (South))
- Evesham
- Ledbury
- Manor Park (promoted from Midlands 4 West (South))
- Old Coventrians
- Old Leamingtonians
- Old Wheatleyans
- Rugby St Andrews
- Shipston on Stour
- Upton-on-Severn (promoted from Midlands 4 West (South))
- Woodrush

== Teams 2015-16 ==
- Cheltenham North
- Evesham (promoted from Midlands 4 West (South))
- Harbury
- Ledbury
- Old Coventrians (relegated from Midlands 2 West (South))
- Old Leamingtonians (relegated from Midlands 2 West (South))
- Old Wheatleyans
- Pershore
- Rugby Lions (promoted from Midlands 4 West (South))
- Shipston on Stour
- Southam
- Woodrush

== Teams 2014-15 ==
- Bedworth (relegated from Midlands 2 West (South))
- Cheltenham North
- Dunlop (relegated from Midlands 2 West (South))
- Harbury (promoted from Midlands 4 West (South))
- Ledbury
- Manor Park
- Old Wheatleyans
- Pershore
- Shipston on Stour
- Southam
- Upton-on-Severn
- Woodrush (promoted from Midlands 4 West (South))

== Teams 2013–14 ==
- Cheltenham North
- Evesham
- Kings Norton
- Ledbury
- Manor Park
- Old Wheatleyans
- Old Yardleians (promoted from Midlands 4 West (South))
- Pershore
- Pinley
- Shipston on Stour (relegated from Midlands 2 West (South))
- Southam
- Upton-on-Severn (relegated from Midlands 2 West (South))

== Teams 2012–13 ==
- Cheltenham North
- Evesham
- Kings Norton
- Ledbury
- Old Coventrians
- Old Leamingtonians
- Old Wheatleyans
- Pershore
- Pinley
- Redditch
- Southam
- Woodrush

== Teams 2009–10 ==
- Dunlop
- Edwardians
- Harbury
- Kings Norton
- Ledbury
- Old Leamingtonians
- Pershore
- Redditch
- Shipston on Stour
- Southam
- Upton upon Severn
- Woodrush

== Teams 2008–09 ==
- Bedworth
- Dunlop
- Edwardians
- Kings Norton
- Ledbury
- Old Leamingtonians
- Pershore
- Shipston on Stour
- Southam
- Upton On Severn
- Woodrush
- Worcester Wanderers

== Original teams ==
Teams in Midlands 3 West (North) and Midlands 3 West (South) were originally part of a single division called Midlands 2 West, which contained the following sides when it was introduced in 1992:

- Aston Old Edwardians - promoted from North Midlands 1 (10th)
- Coventry Welsh - promoted from Staffordshire/Warwickshire 1 (10th)
- Dixonians - promoted from North Midlands 1 (6th)
- Handsworth - promoted from Staffordshire 1 (champions)
- Kenilworth - promoted from Staffordshire/Warwickshire 1 (7th)
- Nuneaton Old Edwardians - promoted from Staffordshire/Warwickshire 1 (6th)
- Old Laurentians - promoted from Warwickshire 1 (champions)
- Selly Oak (Note: Selly Oak are currently known as Moseley Oak - the amateur side affiliated with Birmingham Moseley Rugby Club.) - promoted from North Midlands 2 (champions)
- Shrewsbury - promoted from North Midlands 1 (11th)
- Stratford-upon-Avon - promoted from Staffordshire/Warwickshire 1 (9th)
- Tamworth - promoted from Staffordshire/Warwickshire 1 (8th)
- West Midlands Police - promoted from North Midlands 1 (8th)
- Woodrush - promoted from North Midlands 1 (7th)

== Midlands 3 West (South) honours ==
=== Midlands West 2 (1992–1993) ===
Midlands 3 West (North) and Midlands 3 West (South) were originally part of a single tier 8 division called Midlands West 2. Promotion was to Midlands West 1 and relegation was to either North Midlands 1 or Staffordshire/Warwickshire 1.

Midlands West 2
Season	No of teams	Champions	Runners–up	Relegated teams	Reference
1992–93	13	Nuneaton Old Edwardians	Aston Old Edwardians	Handsworth	
Green backgrounds are the promotion places.

=== Midlands West 2 (1993–1996) ===
The top six teams from Midlands 1 and the top six from North 1 were combined to create National 5 North, meaning that Midlands 2 West dropped to become a tier 9 league. Promotion continued to Midlands West 1 while relegation was to either North Midlands 1 or Staffordshire/Warwickshire 1.

Midlands West 2
Season	No of teams	Champions	Runners–up	Relegated teams	Reference
1993–94	13	Old Laurentians	Newport (Salop)	No relegation	
1994–95	13	Luctonians	Kenilworth	Coventry Welsh, Dunlop	
1995–96	13	Selly Oak	Malvern (Note: Due to the cancellation of National 5 North at the end of the season, nine clubs were promoted including Old Coventrians, Ludlow, Stratford-upon-Avon, Nuneaton Old Edwardians, Tamworth, Stoke Old Boys and Dixonians.)	No relegation (Note: Due to widespread restructuring caused by the cancellation of National 5 North there was no relegation.)	
Green backgrounds are the promotion places.

=== Midlands West 2 (1996–2000) ===
At the end of the 1995–96 season National 5 North was discontinued and Midlands West 2 returned to being a tier 8 league. Promotion continued to Midlands West 1 while relegation was to either North Midlands 1 or Staffordshire/Warwickshire 1.

Midlands West 2
Season	No of teams	Champions	Runners–up	Relegated teams	Reference
1996–97	17	Telford Hornets	Woodrush	Trinity Guild, Newcastle (Staffs), Rugby St Andrews	
1997–98	17	Shrewsbury	Evesham	Coventry Saracens	
1998–99	17	Newcastle (Staffs)	Birmingham Exiles	Manor Park, GPT Coventry, Warley	(Note: Midlands West 2 is mistakenly referred to as Midlands 4 East (South) on RFU website for 1998–99 season.)
1999–00	17	Kidderminster Carolians (Note: Champions Kidderminster Carolians would be promoted into the new Midlands 3 West (North).)	Old Yardleians (Note: Due to Midlands league restructuring four clubs would be promoted including Old Yardleians (2nd) and Leek (4th) who would go into Midlands 3 West (North), while Nuneaton Old Edwardians (3rd) would go into Midlands 3 West (South).)	No relegation (Note: As Midlands West 2 was to split up into two regional leagues there was no relegation. Clubs that were not promoted were transferred into either Midlands 4 West (North) or Midlands 4 West (South).)	(Note: Midlands West 2 is mistakenly referred to as Midlands 4 East (South) on RFU website for 1999–00 season.)
Green backgrounds are the promotion places.

=== Midlands 4 West (South) (2000–2004) ===
Restructuring ahead of the 2000–01 season saw Midlands West 2 split into two tier 8 regional leagues - Midlands 4 West (North) and Midlands 4 West (South). Promotion was now to Midlands 3 West (South) (Note: Prior to the 2000–01 season Midlands 3 West (North) and Midlands 3 West (South) were part of a Midlands West 1.) and relegation to either North Midlands 1 or Warwickshire 1. (Note: Staffordshire/Warwickshire 1 was split into Staffordshire 1 and Warwickshire 1 at the end of the 1999–00 season.)

Midlands 4 West South
Season	No of teams	Champions	Runners–up	Relegated teams	Reference
2000–01	10	Silhillians	Pershore	Stoke Old Boys, Redditch, Trinity Guild	
2001–02	10	Ledbury	Southam	Woodrush, Dunlop, Stourport	
2002–03	10	Shipston-on-Stour	Droitwich	Coventry Welsh, Kings Norton	
2003–04	12	Old Yardleians	Earlsdon	Trinity Guild, Birmingham Exiles, Dunlop	
Green backgrounds are promotion places.

=== Midlands 4 West (South) (2004–2006) ===
At the start of the 2004–05 season Midlands 4 West (South) remained at tier 8 of the league system, with promotion continuing to Midlands 3 West (South). However, the restructuring of the leagues below meant that relegation was now to either North Midlands (South) 1 (Note: North Midlands 1 was divided into North Midlands (North) and North Midlands (South) 1 at the start of the 2004–05 season.) or Warwickshire 1.

Midlands 4 West South
Season	No of teams	Champions	Runners–up	Relegated teams	Reference
2004–05	10	Solihull	Keresley	Manor Park, Southam, Evesham	
2005–06	10	Stourbridge Lions	Edwardians	Harbury	
Green backgrounds are promotion places.

=== Midlands 4 West (South) (2006–2009) ===
At the start of the 2006–07 season Midlands 4 West (South) remained at tier 8 of the league system, with promotion continuing to Midlands 3 West (South). The cancellation of Warwickshire 1 league meant that relegation was now to the newly introduced Midlands 5 West (South).

Midlands 4 West South
Season	No of teams	Champions	Runners–up	Relegated teams	Reference
2006–07	12	Droitwich	Berkswell & Balsall	Keresley, Cleobury Mortimer	
2007–08	12	Spartans (Midlands)	Old Coventrians	Copsewood, Evesham	
2008–09	12	Worcester Wanderers	Bedworth	No relegation	
Green backgrounds are promotion places.

=== Midlands 3 West (South) (2009–present) ===
League restructuring by the RFU meant that Midlands 4 West (North) and Midlands 4 West (South) were renamed as Midlands 3 West (North) and Midlands 3 West (South), with both leagues remaining at tier 8. Promotion was now to Midlands 2 West (South) (formerly Midlands 3 West (North)) and relegation to Midlands 4 West (South).

Midlands 3 West (South) Honours
Season	No of Teams	Champions	Runners–up	Relegated Teams	League Name
2009–10	12	Dunlop	Pershore	Ledbury, Edwardians	Midlands 3 West (South)
2010–11	12	Upton-on-Severn	Newbold-on-Avon	Coventry Welsh, Harbury	Midlands 3 West (South)
2011–12	11	Earlsdon	Shipston-on-Stour	Old Yardleians	Midlands 3 West (South)
2012–13	12	Old Coventrians	Old Leamingtonians	Redditch, Woodrush	Midlands 3 West (South)
2013–14	12	Old Yardleians	Pinley	Evesham, Kings Norton	Midlands 3 West (South)
2014–15	12	Dunlop	Bedworth	Upton-on-Severn, Manor Park	Midlands 3 West (South)
2015–16	12	Rugby Lions	Southam	Pershore, Harbury	Midlands 3 West (South)
2016–17	12	Droitwich	Evesham	Bedworth (Note: Only 1 team relegated this season meaning 11th place Woodrush were safe.)	Midlands 3 West (South)
2017–18	12	Rugby St Andrews	Old Coventrians	Bromyard, Old Wheatleyans	Midlands 3 West (South)
2018–19	12 (Note: Despite Dunlop dropping out of the league, the division stayed at 12 teams due to 4 teams being promoted and relegated into it.)	Pinley	Shipston-on-Stour	Upton-on-Severn, Old Yardleians	Midlands 3 West (South)
2019–20	12	Old Coventrians	Berkswell & Balsall	Bedworth	Midlands 3 West (South)
2020–21	12				
Green backgrounds are promotion places.

== Number of league titles ==
- Droitwich (2)
- Dunlop (2)
- Old Coventrians (2)
- Old Yardleians (2)
- Earlsdon (1)
- Kidderminster Carolians (1) (Note: Kidderminster Carolians title was when league was single division known as Midlands West 2.)
- Ledbury (1)
- Luctonians (1) (Note: Luctonians title was when league was single division known as Midlands West 2.)
- Newcastle (Staffs) (1) (Note: Newcastle (Staffs) title was when division was league was single division known as Midlands West 2.)
- Nuneaton Old Edwardians (1) (Note: Nuneaton Old Edwardians title was when league was single division known as Midlands West 2.)
- Old Laurentians (1) (Note: Old Laurentians title was when league was single division known as Midlands West 2.)
- Pinley (1)
- Rugby Lions (1)
- Rugby St Andrews (1)
- Selly Oak (1) (Note: Selly Oak's title was when league was single division known as Midlands West 2.)
- Shipston-on-Stour (1)
- Shrewsbury (1) (Note: Shrewsbury's title was when league was single division known as Midlands West 2.)
- Silhillians (1)
- Solihull (1)
- Spartans (Midlands) (1)
- Stourbridge Lions (1)
- Telford Hornets (1) (Note: Telford Hornets title was when league was single division known as Midlands West 2.)
- Upton-on-Severn (1)
- Worcester Wanderers (1)

== See also ==
- Midlands RFU
- North Midlands RFU
- Warwickshire RFU
- English rugby union system
- Rugby union in England
- English Rugby Union Leagues
- English rugby union system
- Rugby union in England
