= Midlands 6 West (SW) =

English rugby union league

English Rugby Union Midland Division – Midlands 6 West (SW) is an English Rugby Union League.

Midlands 6 West (SW) is made up of teams from around the West Midlands of England who play home and away matches throughout a winter season. As with many low level they are often subject to re-structure

Promoted teams move up to Midlands 5 West (South). Teams that are second place at the end of the season go into a play off with the second placed team in Midlands 6 West (SE).

== Teams 2008–2009 ==
- Birmingham C.S.
- Birmingham Exiles
- Bredon Star
- Bromyard
- Chaddesley Corbett
- Claverdon
- Clee Hill
- Highley
- Tenbury
- Warley

== See also ==
- English rugby union system
