= Midlands 2 West =

English rugby union league

English Rugby Union Midland Division - Midlands 2 West is an English Rugby Union League.

Midlands 2 West is made up of teams from around the Midlands of England who play home and away matches throughout a winter season.

Promoted teams move up to Midlands 1.

== Teams 2008-2009 ==
- Bromsgrove
- Burton
- Camp Hill
- Cheltenham North
- Dudley Kingswinford
- Hereford
- Solihull
- Stoke
- Stratford Upon Avon
- Sutton Coldfield
- Walsall
- Whitchurch

== See also ==
- English rugby union system
