= Staffordshire/Warwickshire 4 =

English rugby union league

- Current season or competition: 1995–96 Staffordshire/Warwickshire 4
- Sport: Rugby union
- Instituted: 1992; 34 years ago
- Ceased: 1996; 30 years ago
- Number of teams: 5
- Country: England
- Holders: Ford (1st title) (1995–96) (transferred to Warwickshire (Note: Typically champions Ford would be promoted to Staffordshire/Warwickshire 3 but the splitting of the Staffordshire and Warwickshire leagues meant they were transferred to Warwickshire instead.))
- Most titles: Multiple teams (1 title)

Staffordshire/Warwickshire 4 was a tier 13 English Rugby Union league with teams from Staffordshire and Warwickshire taking part. Promoted teams moved up to Staffordshire/Warwickshire 3 and there was no relegation. Restructuring of the Staffordshire/Warwickshire leagues at the end of the 1995–96 season meant that the league was cancelled and all teams either transferring to the Warwickshire regional division or dropping out of the leagues.

== Original teams ==
When this division was introduced in 1992 as part of a merger of the Staffordshire and Warwickshire leagues, it contained the following teams:

- Bloxwich - N/A (new to league)
- Burntwood - transferred from Staffordshire 2 (7th)
- Cheadle - transferred from Staffordshire 2 (8th)
- Coventry Jaguar - transferred from Warwickshire 3 (7th)
- Coventry Post Office - transferred from Warwickshire 3 (6th)
- Ford - transferred from Warwickshire 3 (8th)
- Rugby Welsh - transferred from Warwickshire 3 (9th)
- Shottery - transferred from Warwickshire 3 (4th)
- Stone - N/A (new to league)
- Warwickshire Police - N/A (new to league)

== Staffordshire/Warwickshire 4 honours ==
=== Staffordshire/Warwickshire 4 (1992–1993) ===
The original Staffordshire/Warwickshire 4 was a tier 12 league. Promotion was to Staffordshire/Warwickshire 3 and there was no relegation.

Staffordshire/Warwickshire 4
Season	No of teams	Champions	Runners–up	Relegated teams	Reference
1992–93	10	Warwickshire Police	Burntwood	No relegation	
Green backgrounds are promotion places.

=== Staffordshire/Warwickshire 4 (1993–1996) ===
The top six teams from Midlands 1 and the top six from North 1 were combined to create National 5 North, meaning that Staffordshire/Warwickshire 4 dropped to become a tier 13 league. Promotion continued to Staffordshire/Warwickshire 3 and there was no relegation. The division was cancelled at the end of the 1995–96 season with teams transferred into Warwickshire league or dropping out of the league altogether.

Staffordshire/Warwickshire 4
Season	No of teams	Champions	Runners–up	Relegated teams	Reference
1993–94	9	Bloxwich	Coventry Technical	No relegation	
1994–95	8	Rugby Welsh	Shottery	No relegation	
1995–96	5	Ford (Note: Restructuring of the Staffordshire/Warwickshire leagues would see champions Ford transferred into the Warwickshire regional division.)	Warwick (Note: Restructuring meant that runners up Warwick were also transferred into the Warwickshire regional division. Michelen, Stone and Coventry Jaguar would drop out of the leagues.)	No relegation	
Green backgrounds are the promotion places.

== Number of league titles ==
- Bloxwich (1)
- Ford (1)
- Rugby Welsh (1)
- Warwickshire Police (1)

== See also ==
- Staffordshire/Warwickshire 1
- Staffordshire/Warwickshire 2
- Staffordshire/Warwickshire 3
- Midlands RFU
- Staffordshire RU
- Warwickshire RFU
- English rugby union system
- Rugby union in England
