= Staffordshire/Warwickshire 3 =

English rugby union league

- Current season or competition: 1995–96 Staffordshire/Warwickshire 3
- Sport: Rugby union
- Instituted: 1992; 34 years ago
- Ceased: 1996; 30 years ago
- Number of teams: 12
- Country: England
- Holders: Burntwood (1st title) (1995–96) (transferred to Staffordshire (Note: Typically champions Burntwood would be promoted to Staffordshire/Warwickshire 2 but the splitting of the Staffordshire and Warwickshire leagues meant they were transferred to Staffordshire instead.))
- Most titles: Multiple teams (1 title)

Staffordshire/Warwickshire 3 was a tier 12 English Rugby Union league with teams from Staffordshire and Warwickshire taking part. Promoted teams moved up to Staffordshire/Warwickshire 2 and relegated teams dropped to Staffordshire/Warwickshire 4. Restructuring of the Staffordshire/Warwickshire leagues at the end of the 1995–96 season meant that the league was cancelled and all teams transferred into either the Staffordshire or Warwickshire regional divisions.

== Original teams ==
When this division was introduced in 1992 as part of a merger of the Staffordshire and Warwickshire leagues, it contained the following teams:

- Alcester - transferred from Warwickshire 3 (champions)
- Atherstone - transferred from Warwickshire 2 (8th)
- Claverdon - transferred from Warwickshire 2 (10th)
- Harbury - transferred from Warwickshire 2 (11th)
- Michelin - transferred from Staffordshire 2 (6th)
- Old Warwickians (Note: In 2004 Old Warwickians RFC would merge with Warwick RFC to form Warwickian RUFC.) - transferred from Warwickshire 2 (7th)
- Shipston-on-Stour - transferred from Warwickshire 2 (9th)
- Standard - transferred from Warwickshire 3 (3rd)
- Warwick (Note: In 2004 Warwick RFC would merge with Old Warwickians RFC to form Warwickian RUFC.) - transferred from Warwickshire 3 (runners up)
- Wheaton Aston & Penkridge - transferred from Staffordshire 2 (4th)
- Wulfrun (Note: Wulfrun would later merge with Old Oaks and Rubery Owen in 1998 to form Essington RUFC.) - transferred from Staffordshire 2 (5th)

== Staffordshire/Warwickshire 3 honours ==
=== Staffordshire/Warwickshire 3 (1992–1993) ===
The original Staffordshire/Warwickshire 3 was a tier 11 league. Promotion was to Staffordshire/Warwickshire 2 and relegation to Staffordshire/Warwickshire 4.

Staffordshire/Warwickshire 3
Season	No of teams	Champions	Runners–up	Relegated teams	Reference
1992–93	12	Atherstone	Harbury	Coventry Technical	
Green backgrounds are promotion places.

=== Staffordshire/Warwickshire 3 (1993–1996) ===
The top six teams from Midlands 1 and the top six from North 1 were combined to create National 5 North, meaning that Staffordshire/Warwickshire 3 dropped to become a tier 12 league. Promotion continued to Staffordshire/Warwickshire 2 and relegation to Staffordshire/Warwickshire 4. The division was cancelled at the end of the 1995–96 season and all teams transferred into either the Staffordshire or Warwickshire league.

Staffordshire/Warwickshire 3
Season	No of teams	Champions	Runners–up	Relegated teams	Reference
1993–94	13	Shipston-on-Stour	Warwickshire Police	No relegation (Note: Although there was no relegation, 5th place Wulfrun would be transferred to North Midlands 3 ahead of the 1994–95 season.)	
1994–95	12	Old Warwickians	Alcester	Warwick, Old Oaks, Standard	
1995–96	12	Burntwood (Note: Restructuring meant that champions Burntwood were transferred to Staffordshire 1.)	Linley & Kidsgrove (Note: Restructuring meant that clubs would be transferred to different leagues. Linley & Kidsgrove (2nd), Rubery Owen (4th), Rugeley (5th), Bloxwich (6th) and Wheaton Aston & Penkridge (7th) would go into Staffordshire, while Claverdon (3rd), Shottery (8th), Standard (9th), Rugby Welsh (10th), Harbury (11th) and Coventry Technical (12th) would go into Warwickshire.)	No relegation (Note: Restructuring meant there was no relegation.)	
Green backgrounds are the promotion places.

== Number of league titles ==
- Atherstone (1)
- Burntwood (1)
- Old Warwickians (1)
- Shipston-on-Stour (1)

== See also ==
- Staffordshire/Warwickshire 1
- Staffordshire/Warwickshire 2
- Staffordshire/Warwickshire 4
- Midlands RFU
- Staffordshire RU
- Warwickshire RFU
- English rugby union system
- Rugby union in England
