= Staffordshire/Warwickshire 2 =

English rugby union league

- Current season or competition: 1995–96 Staffordshire/Warwickshire 2
- Sport: Rugby union
- Instituted: 1992; 34 years ago
- Ceased: 1996; 30 years ago
- Number of teams: 13
- Country: England
- Holders: Berkswell & Balsall (1st title) (1995–96) (promoted to Staffordshire/Warwickshire 1)
- Most titles: Multiple teams (1 title)

Staffordshire/Warwickshire 2 was a tier 11 English Rugby Union league with teams from Staffordshire and Warwickshire taking part. Promoted teams moved up to Staffordshire/Warwickshire 1 and relegated teams dropped to Staffordshire/Warwickshire 3. Restructuring of the Staffordshire/Warwickshire leagues at the end of the 1995–96 season meant that the division was cancelled and all teams transferred into Staffordshire/Warwickshire 1 (Note: After the 1995–06 season all Staffordshire/Warwickshire leagues below Staffordshire/Warwickshire 1 would be cancelled and split back into regional leagues; Staffordshire and Warwickshire.).

== Original teams ==
When this division was introduced in 1992 as part of a merger of the Staffordshire and Warwickshire leagues, it contained the following teams:

- Berkswell & Balsall - transferred from Warwickshire 2 (3rd)
- Cannock - transferred from Staffordshire 1 (8th)
- Coventrians - transferred from Warwickshire 2 (runners up)
- Earlsdon - transferred from Warwickshire 2 (5th)
- Old Oaks (Note: Old Oaks would later merge with Rubery Owen and Wulfrun in 1998 to form Essington RUFC.) - transferred from Staffordshire 2 (runners up)
- Pinley - transferred from Warwickshire 2 (4th)
- Rubery Owen (Note: Rubery Owen would later merge with Old Oaks and Wulfrun in 1998 to form Essington RUFC.) - transferred from Staffordshire 1 (7th)
- Rugby St Andrews - transferred from Warwickshire 2 (6th)
- Rugeley - transferred from Staffordshire 2 (champions)
- Silhillians - transferred from Warwickshire 1 (11th)
- Southham - transferred from Warwickshire 2 (champions)
- Spartans - transferred from Warwickshire 1 (9th)
- Stoke Old Boys (Note: Old Boys side of Stoke Park School in Coventry.) - transferred from Warwickshire 1 (10th)

== Staffordshire/Warwickshire 2 honours ==
=== Staffordshire/Warwickshire 2 (1992–1993) ===
The original Staffordshire/Warwickshire 2 was a tier 10 league. Promotion was to Staffordshire/Warwickshire 1 and relegation to Staffordshire/Warwickshire 3.

Staffordshire/Warwickshire 2
Season	No of teams	Champions	Runners–up	Relegated teams	Reference
1992–93	13	Stoke Old Boys	Southham	Rugeley, Rubery Owen	
Green backgrounds are promotion places.

=== Staffordshire/Warwickshire 2 (1993–1996) ===
The top six teams from Midlands 1 and the top six from North 1 were combined to create National 5 North, meaning that Staffordshire/Warwickshire 2 dropped to become a tier 11 league. Promotion continued to Staffordshire/Warwickshire 1 and relegation to Staffordshire/Warwickshire 3. The division was cancelled at the end of the 1995–96 season and all teams transferred up into Staffordshire/Warwickshire 1.

Staffordshire/Warwickshire 2
Season	No of teams	Champions	Runners–up	Relegated teams	Reference
1993–94	13	Atherstone	Rugby St Andrews	Old Oaks	
1994–95	13	Silhillians	Coventrians	Harbury, Warwickshire Police, Linley & Kidsgrove	
1995–96	13	Berkswell & Balsall	Earlsdon (Note: Restructuring meant that all teams would be promoted up into Staffordshire/Warwickshire 1.)	No relegation (Note: Restructuring meant there was no relegation.)	
Green backgrounds are the promotion places.

== Number of league titles ==
- Atherstone (1)
- Berkswell & Balsall (1)
- Silhillians (1)
- Stoke Old Boys (1)

== See also ==
- Staffordshire/Warwickshire 1
- Staffordshire/Warwickshire 3
- Staffordshire/Warwickshire 4
- Midlands RFU
- Staffordshire RU
- Warwickshire RFU
- English rugby union system
- Rugby union in England
