= Staffordshire/Warwickshire 1 =

Tier 9 English Rugby Union league

- Current season or competition: 1999–00 Staffordshire/Warwickshire 1
- Sport: Rugby union
- Instituted: 1987; 39 years ago (as Staffordshire/Warwickshire)
- Ceased: 2000; 26 years ago
- Number of teams: 17
- Country: England
- Holders: Handsworth (1999–00) (promoted to Midlands 4 West (North))
- Most titles: Multiple teams (1 title)

Staffordshire/Warwickshire 1 was a tier 9 English Rugby Union league, with teams from Staffordshire and Warwickshire taking part. Promoted teams moved up to Midlands West 2 and relegated teams dropped to either Staffordshire 1 or Warwickshire 1. The division was cancelled at the end of the 1999–00 campaign due to nationwide league restructuring by the RFU, with the majority of teams transferred into the newly introduced Midlands 4 West (North) or Midlands 4 West (South).

== Original teams ==
When league rugby began in 1987, this division (known as Staffordshire/Warwickshire) contained the following teams:

- Bedworth
- Handsworth
- Kenilworth
- Leek
- Newcastle (Staffs)
- Nuneaton Old Edwardians
- Old Leamingtonians (Note: Old Boys side of Leamington College.)
- Old Longtonians (Note: Formed as Old Boys side of Longton High School. Old Longtonians would be renamed as Longton Rugby Club in 1994.)
- Stoke Old Boys (Note: Old Boys side of Stoke Park School in Coventry.)
- Stratford-upon-Avon
- Willenhall

== Staffordshire/Warwickshire 1 Honours ==
=== Staffordshire/Warwickshire (1987–1992) ===
The original Staffordshire/Warwickshire was a tier 7 league with promotion up to Midlands 2 West and relegation down to either Staffordshire 1 or Warwickshire 1.

Staffordshire/Warwickshire
Season	No of teams	Champions	Runners–up	Relegated teams	Reference
1987–88	11	Bedworth	Old Leamingtonians	Handsworth, Kenilworth	
1988–89	11	Keresley	Leamington	Trentham, Stoke Old Boys	
1989–90	11	Leamington	Willenhall	Handsworth	
1990–91	11	Broadstreet	Old Longtonians	Uttoxeter	
1991–92	11	Old Longtonians	Newcastle (Staffs) (Note: Restructuring of the leagues meant that 10 teams were promoted at the end of the season - Old Longtonians, Newcastle (Staffs), Willenhall, Leek and Old Leamingtonians would go up into the Midlands West 1, while Nuneaton Old Edwardians, Kenilworth, Tamworth, Stratford-upon-Avon and Coventry Welsh would go into Midlands West 2.)	No relegation (Note: Due to league restructuring there would be no relegation.)	
Green backgrounds are promotion places.

=== Staffordshire/Warwickshire 1 (1992–1993) ===
The merger of the Staffordshire and Warwickshire leagues would lead to the division being renamed Staffordshire/Warwickshire 1 and dropping to being a tier 9 league. Promotion was now to the newly introduced Midlands West 2 and relegation to Staffordshire/Warwickshire 2.

Staffordshire/Warwickshire 1
Season	No of teams	Champions	Runners–up	Relegated teams	Reference
1992–93	13	Old Coventrians	Manor Park	Uttoxeter, Wednesbury	
Green backgrounds are promotion places.

=== Staffordshire/Warwickshire 1 (1993–1996) ===
The top six teams from Midlands 1 and the top six from North 1 were combined to create National 5 North, meaning that Staffordshire/Warwickshire 1 dropped to become a tier 10 league. Promotion continued to Midlands West 2 and relegation to Staffordshire/Warwickshire 2.

Staffordshire/Warwickshire 1
Season	No of teams	Champions	Runners–up	Relegated teams	Reference
1993–94	13	Dunlop	Trinity Guild	Handsworth	
1994–95	13	Stoke Old Boys	Southam	Uttoxeter	
1995–96	13	Manor Park	Southam (Note: Due to the cancellation of National 5 North at the end of the season, six clubs were promoted including Southam, Coventry Saracens, Rugby St Andrews, Trinity Guild and GPT Coventry.)	No relegation (Note: Due to widespread restructuring caused by the cancellation of National 5 North there was no relegation, although bottom side Eccleshall would drop out of the league at the end of the season.)	
Green backgrounds are the promotion places.

=== Staffordshire/Warwickshire 1 (1996–2000) ===
At the end of the 1995–96 season, National 5 North was discontinued, and Staffordshire/Warwickshire 1 returned to being a tier 9 league. Promotion continued to Midlands West 2 and relegation to Staffordshire/Warwickshire 2. At the end of 1999–00, the league was discontinued due to RFU restructuring.

Staffordshire/Warwickshire 1
Season	No of teams	Champions	Runners–up	Relegated teams	Reference
1996–97	15	Berkswell & Balsall	Spartans (Midlands)	Atherstone, Coventrians	
1997–98	17	Newcastle (Staffs)	Spartans (Midlands)	Rugby St Andrews, Old Wheatleyans, Pinley	
1998–99	17	Silhillians	Wednesbury	Coventry Saracens, Harbury, GEC St Leonards	
1999–00	17	Handsworth (Note: Champions Handsworth would be promoted to Midlands 4 West (North).)	Burntwood (Note: Due to Midlands league restructuring four clubs would be promoted, including Burntwood (2nd) (Midlands 4 West (North)), Dunlop (3rd) and Trinity Guild (both Midlands 4 West (South)).)	No relegation (Note: The cancellation of the Staffordshire/Warwickshire leagues meant that there was no relegation, with non-promoted sides being transferred either to Staffordshire 1 or Warwickshire 1.)	
Green backgrounds are the promotion places.

== Number of league titles ==
- Bedworth (1)
- Berkswell & Balsall (1)
- Broadstreet (1)
- Dunlop (1)
- Handsworth (1)
- Keresley (1)
- Leamington (1)
- Manor Park (1)
- Newcastle (Staffs) (1)
- Old Coventrians (1)
- Old Longtonians (1)
- Silhillians (1)
- Stoke Old Boys (1)

== See also ==
- Staffordshire/Warwickshire 2
- Staffordshire/Warwickshire 3
- Staffordshire/Warwickshire 4
- Midlands RFU
- Staffordshire RU
- Warwickshire RFU
- English rugby union system
- Rugby union in England
