= John Wilson (Yorkshire cricketer) =

English cricketer

John Wilson (30 June 1857 – 11 November 1931) was an English amateur first-class cricketer, who played in four matches for Yorkshire County Cricket Club between 1887 and 1888.

Born in Hoyland, Yorkshire, England, Wilson was a right arm slow underarm bowler, who took twelve first-class wickets at 13.75. Wilson scored seventeen runs, as a right hand bat, with a best score of 13 not out. He took three catches in the field.

Wilson died in November 1931, in Millhouses, Sheffield, Yorkshire, aged 74.
