= Corley =

Village in Warwickshire, England

Coordinates: 52°27′N 1°33′W

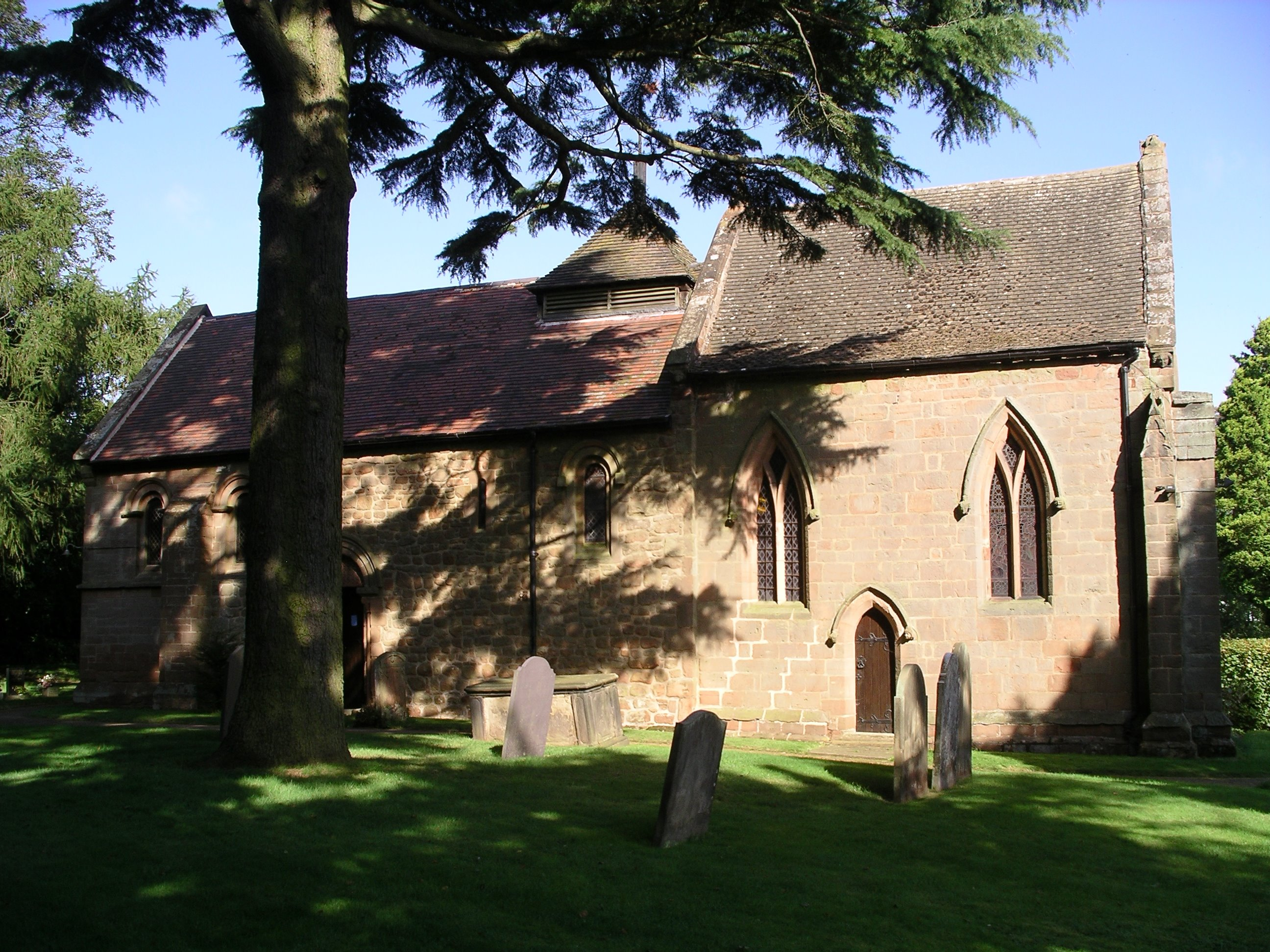
- St Mary's church

- Location within Warwickshire
- Population: 810 (2021)
- Civil parish: Corley
- District: North Warwickshire
- Shire county: Warwickshire
- Region: West Midlands
- Country: England
- Sovereign state: United Kingdom
- Post town: COVENTRY
- Postcode district: CV7
- Dialling code: 01676
- Police: Warwickshire
- Fire: Warwickshire
- Ambulance: West Midlands
- UK Parliament: North Warwickshire and Bedworth

Corley (and the associated hamlets of Corley Ash and Corley Moor) is a village and civil parish in the North Warwickshire district of Warwickshire, England. The population at the 2021 census was 810. It is located about 8.5 kilometres (5.3 mi) northwest of Coventry and 3.25 kilometres (2.02 mi) southeast of the village of Fillongley. The M6 motorway runs close by, and the area is familiar to motorists as it is the site of Corley Services. Other significant buildings in the area include Corley Hall, which was built in the 16th century. Half-a-mile east of the village lies the sandstone rock formation of Corley Rocks.

Corley Ash is situated directly north of the M6 motorway, approximately 1.25 miles (2.01 km) northwest of the main village and 0.8 miles (1.3 km) southeast of Fillongley village centre. The larger hamlet of Corley Moor is 1.5 miles (2.4 km) west of Corley village, just south of the M6 motorway. Unusually, residences on the south side of Corley Moor lie within the boundaries of the City of Coventry, so it is split between two local authorities.

The parish church of St Mary dates from the 12th century and is a Grade II* listed building. Corley is also home to Corley Cricket Club, which entered its 65th season in 2012. One of the club's most notable former players is James Ormond, who went on to represent England Cricket Team. The club has also seen many of its players compete at county level, including Race Williams and John Wilson, the latter representing Leicestershire young cricketers. Following a nationwide competition in 2012 Corley beat over 1500 other cricket clubs to be awarded the title of "Biggest Little Cricket Club" - The most loved and worthy in England and Wales. Club representatives have been invited to the National Outstanding Contribution to Cricket Awards ceremony at Lord's Cricket Ground on two occasions since 2011 following nominations from the Warwickshire Cricket Board. On 14 July 2013 Corley CC hosted the famous Lashings World XI, one the biggest games in the club's history.

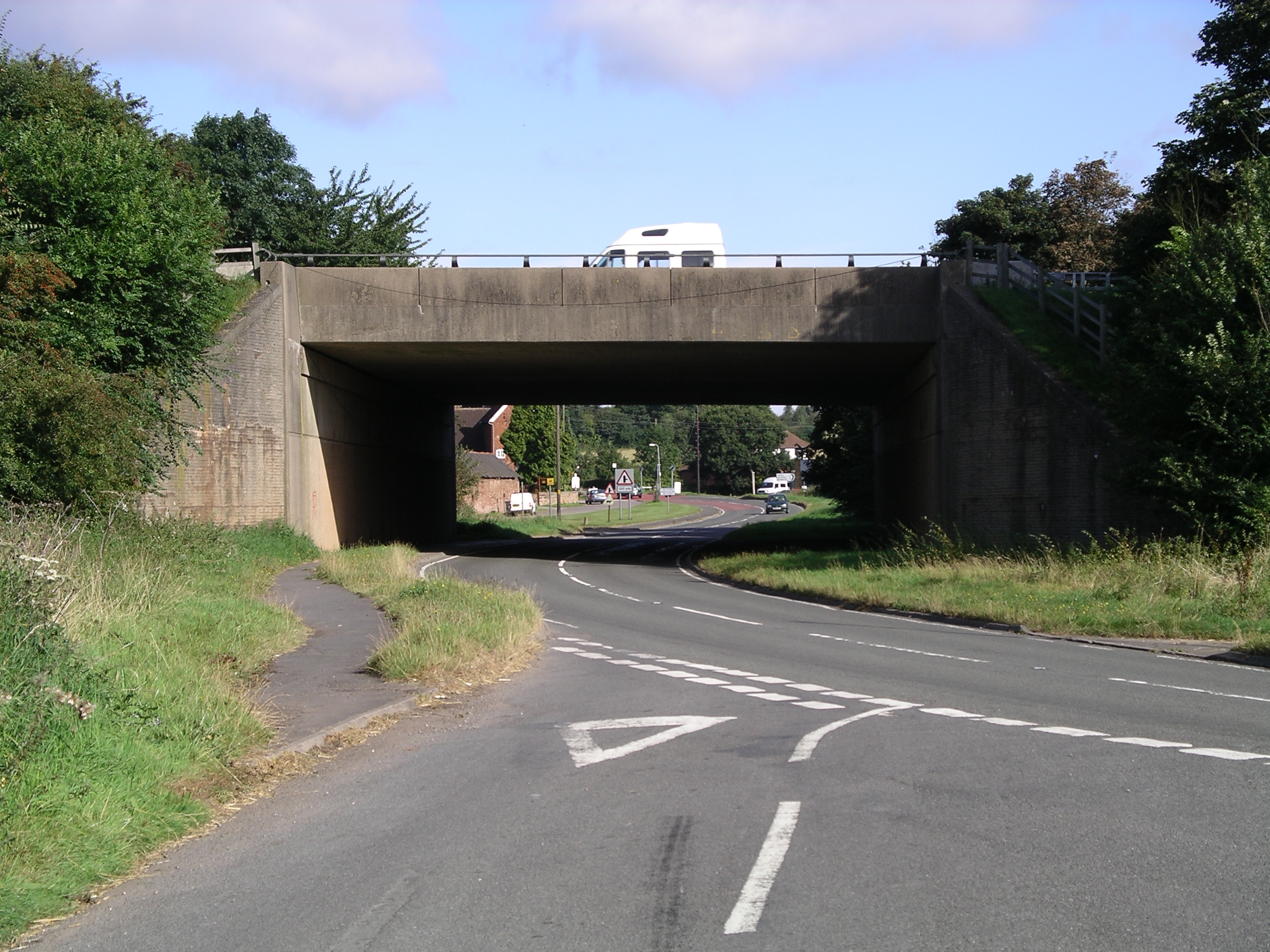
The bridge for the M6 motorway at Corley Ash.
