= Silhillians RUFC =

English rugby union club, based in Solihull, England

- Union: North Midlands RFU, Warwickshire RFU
- Nickname(s): Sils, Old Sils
- Founded: 1932; 94 years ago
- Location: Knowle, Solihull, West Midlands, England
- Ground: The Memorial Ground
- Coach: Gaz Taylor
- Captain: Olly Beech
- League: Regional 2 West Midlands
- 2023–24: 1st (promoted to Regional 1 Midlands)

Official website
- www.silhillians.com

Silhillians Rugby Union Football Club is a rugby club based at Copt Heath near Solihull in the English West Midlands. They compete in Regional 1 Midlands following their promotion from Regional 2 West Midlands in 2024. The club regularly fields a 1st and 2nd XVs and in the 'mini and junior' section teams, ages range from under 6s to under 17s and colts.

== History ==
=== Origins and early days ===
The club was founded in 1932 as Solihull Old Boys and was exclusively for former pupils of Solihull School, an historic Private School. The school's headmaster at the time, Mr A R Thompson, was the club's first President and attended every meeting and fixture until his retirement in 1947. Upon the outbreak of World War II thirteen members of the 1st XV were called up meaning that the club was temporarily defunct but was reformed by Alan Bradbury, Mel Cooper and Claude 'CT' Coton in 1947 as the Old Silhillians (the name given to Old Boys of Solihull School. Coton was selected, at the age of 18, for the committee immediately after leaving School. 'CTC' went on to captain the 1st XV, served as President twice and was a committee member for more than fifty years.

In 1953, the club moved to Dingle Lane in Solihull and the first game on the site was a notable occasion. WC Ramsey, who was the President Elect of the Rugby Football Union 1954-55, sent a WC Ramsey XV to play against the 'Solihull Old Boys' and over 3,000 spectators were in attendance.

In 1959, the inaugural Birmingham and Warwickshire Old Boys Rugby Sevens tournament was held for former pupils of notable schools from the region. Amongst others, Rugby School, King Edward VI Aston, Solihull School, King Edward's School, Birmingham, Bablake School and Warwick School sent former pupils to compete.

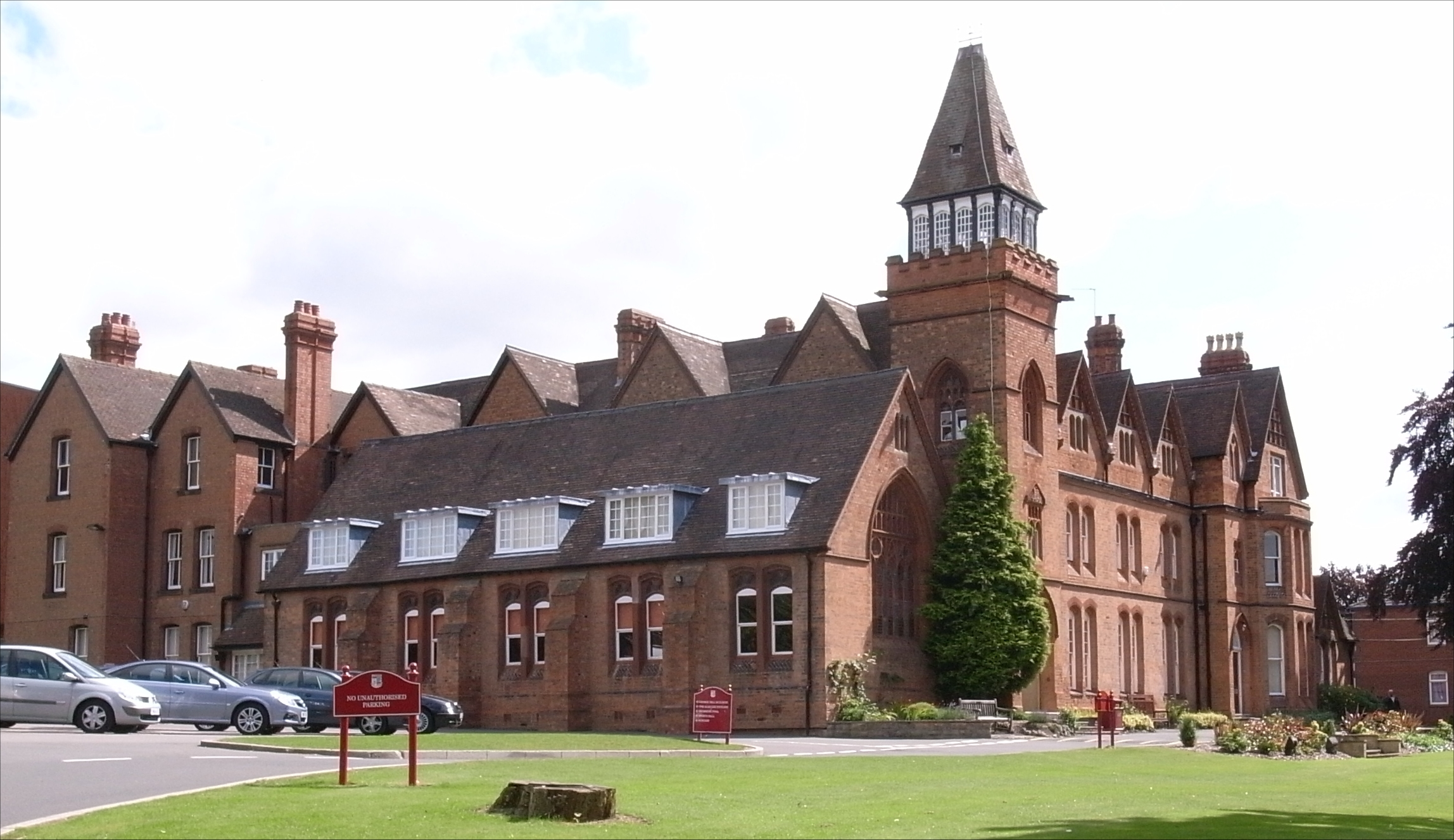
School House at Solihull School, where selection took place during the 1930s and '40s and then intermittently during the 1950s and '60s

In 1967, the Old Silhillians moved to their current home at Copt Heath, about 1 mile from the Solihull School campus. This season was a hugely successful one in the club's history. They won the Birmingham and Warwickshire Old Boys' Rugby Sevens, beating Old Saltleians 13–5 in the final. Captained by Martin Green, they also won 8–3 against the Cambridge University 1st XV. They remained one of the best Old Boys' sides in the Midlands for many years.

One of the most significant points in the history of the club was the decision to go 'open' in 1982, i.e. they accepted members and players who had not attended Solihull School. Thus, they dropped the 'Old' from the name and became Silhillians RUFC.

=== Recent years ===
The Sils were promoted to Warwickshire Division One of the 'Courage League' in 1991 under the captaincy of Alan Elliot. More recently 'The Sils' have enjoyed further promotions; in 1994 to 1996 captained by Nick Savage, 1998–99 when captained by Andrew Durrant, in 2000–01 under the captaincy of Andrew Clutterbuck and in 2012–13 captained by Peter Nicholls. The club's biggest achievement to date was their appearance in the 1999 Tetley's Bitter Vase Final at Twickenham. They lost to Billericay Rugby Football Club 19–3 but many Silhillians look back fondly on that season and the experience of playing at 'Rugby HQ'.

The 2007–08 season saw the Silhillians RUFC celebrate their 75th Anniversary.

== Present day ==
Silhillians RUFC are located at the Memorial Ground in Copt Heath near Solihull. Although the site is skirted to the south and east by rural land it is only 150 yards from the M42 motorway and the easy access has made Silhillians a popular fixture for touring teams or as a pre-season friendly. The rugby club shares the Memorial Clubhouse with the Old Silhillians Association (OSA), the old boys' club of Solihull School. The building houses a gymnasium, squash courts, changing facilities, a rifle range, a function room, a members' bar and administration offices for the rugby club and OSA.

The youth system at the club is thriving with 11 'mini and junior' teams regularly turning out on Sundays. The high standard of education in the local area, both state and private, means that many students carry on to university and thus Silhillians 1st XV is deprived of many young players during term time. Although the club is now open to those who are not former pupils of Solihull School the link between the school and rugby club is still strong and many Old Silhillians represent Silhillians RUFC.

== Club traditions ==
Easter tour

In May 1953 Old Silhillians Rugby Club (as then named) travelled to the Southend Rugby Festival. It has since been an annual tradition that all members of the senior squads are invited to tour with the club. Recent tours have been slightly more far-afield than Southend and have been to France, Galway, Kraków and Prague.

Annual dinner

The annual dinner is a black tie event held at the Memorial Clubhouse and it is traditional that selected members of the committee and the 1st XV captain make speeches and that awards are presented. The Most Improved Player Award, The Peter Styles Trophy and various top try-scorer awards are traditionally given out.

Members' clock

Those who are later than the predetermined meeting time for a fixture, according to the clock in the members' lounge, are fined at the discretion of the senior players.

Captaincy

Captains of the club will stand down at the end of their second season in the role.

Sils Saxons

The Silhillians 2nd/Development XV is known as the Sils Saxons, in the same way that the England Development XV is known as The Saxons.

The Wedgebury Cup

The Wedgebury Cup is annually contested between Silhillians RUFC and local rivals Solihull RFC. The match takes place on Boxing Day and is a popular day amongst spectators, club officials and players alike.

== Honours ==
- Staffordshire/Warwickshire 2 champions: 1994–95
- Staffordshire/Warwickshire 1 champions: 1998–99
- Midlands 4 West (South) champions: 2000–01
- Midlands 2 West (North) champions: 2012–13
- Regional 2 West Midlands champions: 2023–24
