= Blackdown, Warwickshire =

Hamlet and civil parish in Warwickshire, England

Coordinates: 52.316°N 1.536°W

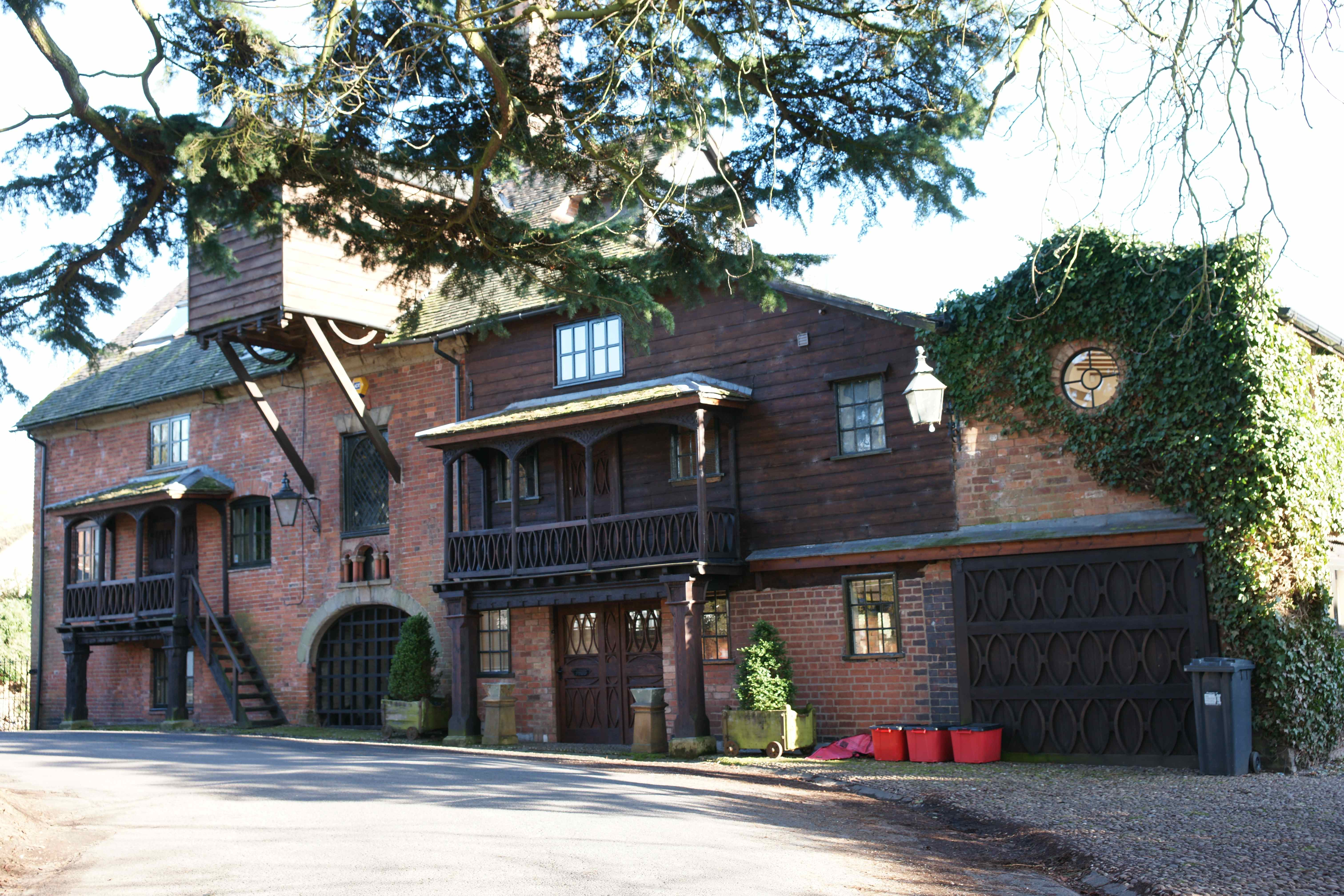
Blackdown Mill

Blackdown is a hamlet and civil parish in the Warwick district of Warwickshire, England. Blackdown is about two miles north of Leamington Spa, between Leamington, Warwick and Kenilworth. According to the 2001 Census, it had a population of 128. From the 2011 Census, population details are included with Old Milverton.

It is named Blakedon in William Dudgale's Antiquities of Warwickshire in 1656 as a district within the parish of Lillington, and as having a mill on the River Avon. Blackdown Mill on Wooton Road is Grade II listed. Blackdown Manor is a Grade II listed house on Kenilworth Road: built in the 17th century, it was remodelled in the 19th century.

Just outside the hamlet is Quarry Park Disc Golf Club which is one of only 17 courses in the United Kingdom, and was the venue for the 2008 UK championships as well as being due to host the 2009 championships. Old Leamingtonians, the town's rugby union and Leamington Royals (rugby league) also play home games on the edge of the village.
