= Warwickshire Rugby Football Union =

(England) Warwickshire RFU
- Full name: Warwickshire Rugby Football Union
- Union: RFU
- Founded: 1914; 112 years ago
- Region: Warwickshire
Team kit

Official website
- www.warwickshirerfu.co.uk

The Warwickshire Rugby Football Union is a governing body for rugby union in part of The Midlands, England. The union is the constituent body of the Rugby Football Union for the city of Coventry and the county of Warwickshire. The current president is Damian Dixon of the Old Leamingtonians Rugby Club.

== History ==
The Warwickshire RFU was created in 1914, after ceding from the now defunct Midland Counties Rugby Union.

== County team ==
Warwickshire play in the County Championship. As of 2017, the representative side competes in Division 2. However, in the past, the county competed at a much higher level, winning the Bill Beaumont Cup (as it is now known) 10 times, the fourth best record in the competition.

Honours

- Bill Beaumont Cup: Winners 10 times; runners up 5 times
- County Championship Plate: Winners (2): 2002, 2007

== Affiliated clubs ==
There are currently 44 clubs affiliated with the union, with teams at both senior and junior level and are based in Warwickshire. The vast majority of the county's clubs compete in the Rugby Football Union Midland Division, with the exception of Coventry RFC (The English Championship) and the University Teams (who compete in the British Universities and Colleges Sport rugby competitions). In addition there are 4 District Unions who form the Inter-District Competition Committee. Warwickshire Schools Rugby Union consist of five schools districts: Coventry Schools, South Warwickshire Schools, North Warwickshire Schools, Rugby Schools and Solihull Schools.

- A.E.I.
- Alcester
- Atherstone
- Barkers Butts
- Bedworth
- Berkswell & Balsall
- Broadstreet
- Claverdon
- Coventrians
- Coventry
- Coventry & Mid-Warwickshire
- Coventry Corsairs
- Coventry Saracens
- Coventry University
- Coventry Welsh
- Dunlop
- Earlsdon
- Harbury
- Kenilworth
- Keresley
- Leamington
- Manor Park
- Newbold-on-Avon
- Nuneaton Old Edwardians
- Nuneaton
- Nuneaton & North Warwickshire
- Old Coventrians
- Old Laurentians
- Old Leamingtonians
- Old Wheatleyans
- Pinley
- Rugby Lions
- Rugby St Andrews
- Rugby Welsh
- Rugby & District
- Shipston-on-Stour
- Shottery
- Silhillians
- Southam
- South Warwickshire
- Spartans
- Stoke Old Boys (Note: Although at first glance one would think they were based in Stoke-on-Trent, Stoke Old Boys are actually based in Coventry.)
- Stratford-upon-Avon
- Sutton Coldfield
- Trinity Guild
- University of Warwick
- Warwickshire Masonic
- 46 ER's

== County club competitions ==
The Warwickshire RFU currently runs the following competitions for club sides based in Warwickshire:

=== Cups ===
- Warwickshire Cup
- Warwickshire Shield
- Warwickshire Vase
- Warwickshire Junior Cup for U16/15/14 Boys

=== Discontinued competitions ===
- Staffordshire/Warwickshire 1 – tier 7-10 league for Staffordshire and Warwickshire clubs that ran between 1987 and 2000
- Staffordshire/Warwickshire 2 – tier 10-11 league for Staffordshire and Warwickshire clubs that ran between 1992 and 1996
- Staffordshire/Warwickshire 3 – tier 11-12 league for Staffordshire and Warwickshire clubs that ran between 1992 and 1996
- Staffordshire/Warwickshire 4 – tier 12-13 league for Staffordshire and Warwickshire clubs that ran between 1992 and 1996
- Warwickshire 1 - tier 8-10 league that ran intermittently between 1987 and 2006
- Warwickshire 2 - tier 9-10 league that ran intermittently between 1987 and 2006
- Warwickshire 3 - tier 10 league that ran between 1987 and 1992

== See also ==
- Midland Division
- English rugby union system
