= Shipston-on-Stour RFC =

English rugby union club, based in the Warwickshire

Coordinates: 52.07°N 1.6242°W

Shipston-on-Stour
- Full name: Shipston-on-Stour Rugby Football Club
- Union: Warwickshire RFU
- Nickname: The Rams
- Founded: 1963; 62 years ago
- Location: Shipston-on-Stour, Warwickshire, England
- Region: Midlands
- Ground: Mayo Road (Capacity: 600)
- League: Regional 2 West Midlands
- 2024–25: 4th
| 1st kit | 2nd kit |

Official website
- www.shipstonrugbyclub.co.uk

Shipston-on-Stour Rugby Football Club is an English rugby union team based in Shipston-on-Stour in Warwickshire. They currently play in Regional 2 West Midlands – a tier 6 league in the English rugby union system – following the club's promotion from Southern Counties North – due to the restructure of the English leagues at the end of the 2021–22 season.

== History ==
Formed in 1963 by a group of teachers and old pupils from Shipston High School, the first squad came from wide across the region. During their first season, the 'Rams' were forced to be a nomadic club with no pitch of their own to use. Instead they relied on the facilities at the school and using some local pubs for post-match refreshments.

In 1964 they were able to regularly put out two teams and with the help of a local farmer, had a pitch of their own to use. Located in the nearby village of Darlingscote the pitch soon became known as 'The Bowl'. By 1968 they were renting an old barn at the rear of The Bell Inn on Sheep Street and with the assistance of Whitbread Flowers they were able to use this structure as a club house. The club moved again in 1973 but with the help of the town's local inhabitants, the local council, the County Council, the RFU, Middlesex RFU and the players themselves a new plan for a Clubhouse and ground at Mayo Road was created.

The club moved yet again in 2000 although this time they stayed based at Mayo Road and moved next door to a purpose-built club house that had been funded with finance from a Sport England lottery grant.

The club now runs four senior teams, a Veterans team, Colts team as well as Mini and Junior Rugby at eight different age groups. The 2002 season saw the first team run out at Twickenham for the Powergen Junior Vase Final.

== Honours ==
- Staffordshire/Warwickshire 3 champions: 1993–94
- Midlands 4 West (South) champions: 2002–03
- Midlands 4 West (South) promotion: 2011–12
- Midlands 4 West (South) promotion: 2018–19
- Southern Counties North promotion: 2021–22
