= Warwickian RUFC =

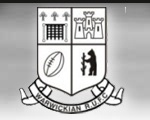
- Union: Rugby Football Union
- Nickname(s): Warwickians
- Founded: 2004
- Location: Warwick
- Ground(s): Hampton Road Sports Ground
- League(s): Midlands 5 West (South)

Official website
- www.pitchero.com/clubs/warwickian

Warwickian Rugby Union Football Club or WRUFC, known as Warwickians, is a Rugby union club in Warwickshire, England. The team currently fields a 1st XV in the Midlands 5 West (South) League, and a 2nd XV .

The team is based at the Hampton Road Sports Ground, on Hampton Road, Warwick.

== History ==
Warwickian RUFC is a new rugby club established in 2004. It was formed by folding the two former clubs, Old Warwickian RFC and Warwick RFC, to produce one club for the playing and development of rugby in the town of Warwick and its environs.

Old Warwickian RUFC was formed in 1929 by the old boys of Warwick School, the Old Warwickian Association. It has been based at Hampton Road Sports Ground with 2 pitches and a clubhouse since September 1980. In 1989 it incorporated another club, AP Lockheed, while retaining its name of Old Warwickian.

Warwick RFC was formed in 1976 by a splinter group of disaffected Old Warwickian players. They leased a ground from Warwick District Council on St Mary's Lands, Hampton Road. The Council gave the rugby club notice to quit due to redevelopment work along Hampton Road following Council's sale of land for development.

With neither Club hitting the rugby heights and Warwick RFC homeless, it was a logical decision to amalgamate the Clubs into one new entity. The benefits of combined resources on and off the field are immediately apparent.

The 1st XV plays rugby in the Midland 5 West (South) League . The 2nd XV is a development side to bring new or young players through to the first team by playing alongside established players.

1 September 2007 saw the official opening of the new Warwickian Clubhouse jointly by the Mayor of Warwick and the President of Warwickshire RFU. This magnificent facility has been built to the highest standards and includes 4 large changing rooms, showers and separate referees changing and shower. The large, airy Club room houses a Bar, of course, with a professionally equipped kitchen off. Outside the Club boasts 2 pitches, with space for a third, and a floodlit training area.

== Honours ==
Old Warwickians (Parent club)

- Staffordshire/Warwickshire 3 champions: 1994–95
