= Rugby Football Union Midland Division =

Rugby union governing body

The Rugby Football Union Midland Division is a rugby union governing body for the English Midlands and is part of the Rugby Football Union.

== Constituent bodies ==
- East Midlands
- Leicestershire
- North Midlands
- Notts, Lincs & Derbyshire
- Staffordshire
- Warwickshire

== Leagues ==
It organises the following leagues:

- Regional 1 Midlands (tier 5)
- Regional 2 East Midlands (6)
- Regional 2 North Midlands (6)
- Regional 2 West Midlands (6)
- Midlands 2 East (North) (7)
- Midlands 2 East (South) (7)
- Midlands 2 West (North) (7)
- Midlands 2 West (South) (7)
- Midlands 3 West (North) (8)
- Midlands 3 West (South) (8)
- Midlands 3 East (North) (8)
- Midlands 3 East (South) (8)
- Midlands 4 West (North) (9)
- Midlands 4 West (South) (9)
- Midlands 4 East (North) (9)
- Midlands 4 East (South) (9)
- Midlands 5 West (North) (10)
- Midlands 5 West (South) (10)
- Midlands Reserve Team League Div 1
- Midlands Reserve Team League Div 2

== Cups ==
Clubs also take part in the following national cup competitions:

- RFU Intermediate Cup
- RFU Senior Vase
- RFU Junior Vase

== See also ==
- London & SE Division
- Northern Division
- South West Division
- English rugby union system
