= 2015–16 National League 3 Midlands =

National League 3 Midlands matchday results

This is a list of every 2015–16 National League 3 Midlands matchday results.

== Results ==
=== Matchday 1 ===
Saturday 5 September
Birmingham & Solihull	24 - 32	Syston
Bromsgrove	32 - 31	Sutton Coldfield
Hinckley	21 - 13	Scunthorpe
Lichfield	21 - 0	Sandbach
Longton	12 - 42	Peterborough Lions
Newport (Salop)	36 - 3	Old Northamptonians
Nuneaton	13 - 26	Old Halesonians

=== Matchday 2 ===
Saturday 12 September
Birmingham & Solihull	14 - 17	Bromsgrove
Old Northamptonians	17 - 30	Nuneaton
Peterborough Lions	22 - 9	Newport (Salop)
Sandbach	25 - 3	Longton
Scunthorpe	20 - 24	Lichfield
Sutton Coldfield	3 - 46	Hinckley
Syston	13 - 31	Old Halesonians

=== Matchday 3 ===
Saturday 19 September
Bromsgrove	17 - 3	Syston
Hinckley	41 - 10	Birmingham & Solihull
Lichfield	58 - 19	Sutton Coldfield
Longton	17 - 52	Scunthorpe
Newport (Salop)	35 - 14	Sandbach
Nuneaton	23 - 12	Peterborough Lions
Old Halesonians	41 - 3	Old Northamptonians

=== Matchday 4 ===
Saturday 26 September
Birmingham & Solihull	41 - 17	Lichfield
Bromsgrove	17 - 34	Hinckley
Peterborough Lions	22 - 25	Old Halesonians
Sandbach	19 - 15	Nuneaton
Scunthorpe	35 - 24	Newport (Salop)
Sutton Coldfield	14 - 26	Longton
Syston	38 - 33	Old Northamptonians

=== Matchday 5 ===
Saturday 3 October
Hinckley	32 - 20	Syston
Lichfield	22 - 25	Bromsgrove
Longton	15 - 23	Birmingham & Solihull
Newport (Salop)	12 - 31	Sutton Coldfield
Nuneaton	19 - 30	Scunthorpe
Old Halesonians	27 - 17	Sandbach
Old Northamptonians	17 - 18	Peterborough Lions

=== Matchday 6 ===
Saturday 10 October
Birmingham & Solihull	31 - 34	Newport (Salop)
Bromsgrove	50 - 29	Longton
Hinckley	26 - 14	Lichfield
Sandbach	19 - 22	Old Northamptonians
Scunthorpe	24 - 19	Old Halesonians
Sutton Coldfield	21 - 52	Nuneaton
Syston	27 - 15	Peterborough Lions

=== Matchday 7 ===
Saturday 24 October
Lichfield	27 - 18	Syston
Longton	7 - 21	Hinckley
Newport (Salop)	45 - 26	Bromsgrove
Nuneaton	25 - 3	Birmingham & Solihull
Old Halesonians	41 - 0	Sutton Coldfield
Old Northamptonians	7 - 8	Scunthorpe
Peterborough Lions	10 - 14	Sandbach

=== Matchday 8 ===
Saturday 7 November
Birmingham & Solihull	7 - 29	Old Halesonians
Bromsgrove	16 - 15	Nuneaton
Hinckley	55 - 7	Newport (Salop)
Lichfield	14 - 26	Longton
Scunthorpe	28 - 19	Peterborough Lions
Sutton Coldfield	23 - 22	Old Northamptonians
Syston	5 - 8	Sandbach

=== Matchday 9 ===
Saturday 14 November
Longton	15 - 12	Syston
Newport (Salop)	27 - 10	Lichfield
Nuneaton	6 - 15	Hinckley
Old Halesonians	15 - 16	Bromsgrove
Old Northamptonians	22 - 13	Birmingham & Solihull
Peterborough Lions	12 - 8	Sutton Coldfield
Sandbach	14 - 17	Scunthorpe

=== Matchday 10 ===
Saturday 21 November
Birmingham & Solihull	17 - 22	Peterborough Lions
Bromsgrove	18 - 25	Old Northamptonians
Hinckley	20 - 17	Old Halesonians
Lichfield	15 - 18	Nuneaton
Longton	55 - 0	Newport (Salop)
Sutton Coldfield	20 - 12	Sandbach
Syston	31 - 24	Scunthorpe

=== Matchday 11 ===
Saturday 28 November
Newport (Salop)	7 - 17	Syston
Nuneaton	25 - 12	Longton
Old Halesonians	26 - 24	Lichfield
Old Northamptonians	0 - 36	Hinckley
Peterborough Lions	17 - 3	Bromsgrove
Sandbach	10 - 31	Birmingham & Solihull
Scunthorpe	44 - 7	Sutton Coldfield

=== Matchday 12 ===
Saturday 5 December
Birmingham & Solihull	8 - 29	Scunthorpe
Bromsgrove	51 - 38	Sandbach
Hinckley	39 - 18	Peterborough Lions
Lichfield	24 - 10	Old Northamptonians
Longton	6 - 10	Old Halesonians
Newport (Salop)	10 - 27	Nuneaton
Syston	27 - 23	Sutton Coldfield

=== Matchday 13 ===
Saturday 12 December
Old Halesonians	36 - 10	Newport (Salop)
Old Northamptonians	22 - 10	Longton
Peterborough Lions	43 - 0	Lichfield
Sandbach	11 - 20	Hinckley
Scunthorpe	36 - 6	Bromsgrove
Sutton Coldfield	16 - 18	Birmingham & Solihull
Syston	7 - 24	Nuneaton

=== Matchday 14 ===
Saturday 19 December
Bromsgrove	32 - 27	Birmingham & Solihull
Hinckley	26 - 13	Sutton Coldfield
Lichfield	22 - 26	Scunthorpe
Longton	27 - 8	Sandbach
Newport (Salop)	12 - 31	Peterborough Lions
Nuneaton	27 - 12	Old Northamptonians
Old Halesonians	22 - 8	Syston

=== Matchday 15 ===
Saturday 9 January
Birmingham & Solihull	3 - 18	Hinckley
Old Northamptonians	28 - 21	Old Halesonians
Peterborough Lions	17 - 9	Nuneaton
Sandbach	36 - 15	Newport (Salop)
Scunthorpe	35 - 10	Longton
Sutton Coldfield	17 - 25	Lichfield
Syston	32 - 25	Bromsgrove

=== Matchday 16 (4/7) ===
Saturday 16 January
Hinckley	26 - 0	Bromsgrove
Lichfield	19 - 23	Birmingham & Solihull
Nuneaton	24 - 20	Sandbach
Old Northamptonians	22 - 26	Syston

=== Matchday 17 ===
Saturday 9 January
Birmingham & Solihull	8 - 5	Longton
Bromsgrove	8 - 22	Lichfield
Peterborough Lions	33 - 8	Old Northamptonians
Sandbach	15 - 32	Old Halesonians
Scunthorpe	51 - 3	Nuneaton
Sutton Coldfield	18 - 36	Newport (Salop)
Syston	18 - 12	Hinckley

=== Matchday 18 ===
Saturday 30 January
Lichfield	35 - 32	Hinckley
Longton	20 - 35	Bromsgrove
Newport (Salop)	5 - 18	Birmingham & Solihull
Nuneaton	44 - 12	Sutton Coldfield
Old Halesonians	10 - 28	Scunthorpe
Old Northamptonians	19 - 22	Sandbach
Peterborough Lions	26 - 10	Syston

=== Matchday 16 (7/7) ===
Saturday 6 February
Longton	38 - 3	Sutton Coldfield
Newport (Salop)	3 - 31	Scunthorpe
Old Halesonians	13 - 5	Peterborough Lions

=== Matchday 19 ===
Saturday 13 February
Birmingham & Solihull	17 - 7	Nuneaton
Bromsgrove	29 - 11	Newport (Salop)
Hinckley	29 - 29	Longton
Sandbach	38 - 10	Peterborough Lions
Scunthorpe	48 - 5	Old Northamptonians
Sutton Coldfield	26 - 45	Old Halesonians
Syston	28 - 17	Lichfield

=== Matchday 20 ===
Saturday 20 February
Longton	17 - 15	Lichfield
Newport (Salop)	5 - 28	Hinckley
Nuneaton	38 - 0	Bromsgrove
Old Halesonians	10 - 8	Birmingham & Solihull
Old Northamptonians	24 - 10	Sutton Coldfield
Peterborough Lions	9 - 15	Scunthorpe
Sandbach	32 - 8	Syston

=== Matchday 21 ===
Saturday 27 February
Birmingham & Solihull	35 - 6	Old Northamptonians
Bromsgrove	15 - 35	Old Halesonians
Hinckley	22 - 17	Nuneaton
Lichfield	25 - 27	Newport (Salop)
Scunthorpe	39 - 8	Sandbach
Sutton Coldfield	28 - 60	Peterborough Lions
Syston	31 - 34	Longton

=== Matchday 22 ===
Saturday 5 March
Newport (Salop)	0 - 26	Longton
Nuneaton	31 - 17	Lichfield
Old Northamptonians	36 - 22	Bromsgrove
Peterborough Lions	7 - 19	Birmingham & Solihull
Sandbach	50 - 3	Sutton Coldfield
Scunthorpe	12 - 11	Syston
Saturday 12 March
Old Halesonians	20 - 31	Hinckley

=== Matchday 23 ===
Saturday 19 March
Birmingham & Solihull	24 - 20	Sandbach
Bromsgrove	17 - 20	Peterborough Lions
Hinckley	68 - 3	Old Northamptonians
Lichfield	27 - 24	Old Halesonians
Longton	24 - 25	Nuneaton
Sutton Coldfield	12 - 57	Scunthorpe
Syston	29 - 21	Newport (Salop)

=== Matchday 24 ===
Saturday 2 April
Nuneaton	32 - 33	Newport (Salop)
Old Halesonians	18 - 22	Longton
Old Northamptonians	50 - 29	Lichfield
Peterborough Lions	24 - 26	Hinckley
Sandbach	35 - 18	Bromsgrove
Scunthorpe	17 - 16	Birmingham & Solihull
Sutton Coldfield	23 - 58	Syston

=== Matchday 25 ===
Saturday 9 April
Birmingham & Solihull	43 - 11	Sutton Coldfield
Bromsgrove	5 - 24	Scunthorpe
Hinckley	53 - 10	Sandbach
Lichfield	35 - 50	Peterborough Lions
Longton	33 - 31	Old Northamptonians
Newport (Salop)	13 - 22	Old Halesonians
Nuneaton	17 - 20	Syston

=== Matchday 26 ===
Saturday 16 April
Old Halesonians	15 - 7	Nuneaton
Old Northamptonians	51 - 14	Newport (Salop)
Peterborough Lions	29 - 12	Longton
Sandbach	51 - 42	Lichfield
Scunthorpe	23 - 13	Hinckley
Sutton Coldfield	20 - 59	Bromsgrove
Syston	9 - 19	Birmingham & Solihull
