= Midlands 3 West (North) =

Level 8 English Rugby Union league

Counties 2 Midlands West (West)
- Current season or competition: 2024-25 Counties 2 Midlands West (North)
- Sport: Rugby union
- Instituted: 1992; 34 years ago (as Midlands West 2)
- Number of teams: 12
- Country: England
- Most titles: Telford Hornets (3 titles)
- Website: England RFU

Counties 2 Midlands West (West) (formerly Midlands 3 West (North)) is a level 8 English Rugby Union league and level 3 of the Midlands League, made up of teams from the northern part of the West Midlands region including Shropshire, Staffordshire, parts of Birmingham and the West Midlands and occasionally Cheshire, with home and away matches played throughout the season. When this division began in 1992 it was known as Midlands West 2, until it was split into two regional divisions called Midlands 4 West (North) and Midlands 4 West (South) ahead of the 2000–01 season. Further restructuring of the Midlands leagues ahead of the 2009–10 season, led to it to adopt the name Midlands 3 West (North) and again following the RFU's Adult Competition Review, from season 2022-23 it was known, briefly as Counties 2 Midlands West (North), before the league was split East/West giving rise to its current name.

Promoted teams tend to move up to Counties 2 Midlands West (North) or Counties 2 Midlands West (South) depending on location. Relegated teams typically drop to Midlands 4 West (North). Each year all clubs in the division also take part in the RFU Senior Vase - a level 8 national competition.

== 2026-27 ==
Departing were Trentham (champions) and Wildenhall (runners-up) promoted to Counties 1 Midlands West (North) while Longton and Newcastle (Staffs) II were relegated.

Team	Ground	Capacity	City/Area	Previous season
Ashbourne	Recreation Ground		Ashbourne, Derbyshire	4th
Barton-under-Needwood	Holland Sports Club		Barton-under-Needwood, Staffordshire	Promoted from Counties 3 Midlands West (North)
Bridgnorth Bulls	Edgar Davies Ground		Bridgnorth, Shropshire	6th
Burton 2XV	Battlestead Croft, Tatenhill		Burton, Staffordshire	7th
Clee Hill	Tenbury Road		Cleehill, Shropshire	3rd
Cleobury Mortimer	Love Lane		Cleobury Mortimer, Shropshire	Promoted from Counties 3 Midlands West (South)
Kidderminster Carolians	Marlpool Lane		Kidderminster, Worcestershire	Relegated from Counties 1 Midlands West (South) (11th)
Leek II	Altrad Park		Cheddleton, Staffordshire	9th
Luctonians III	Mortimer Park	2,500 (300 seats)	Kingsland, Herefordshire	8th
Stafford	The County Ground		Stafford, Staffordshire	5th
Telford Hornets	Hinkshay Road		Telford, Shropshire	Relegated from Counties 1 Midlands West (North) (11th)
Wolverhampton	Castlecroft Road		Castlecroft, Wolverhampton, West Midlands	10th

Locations of the 2026-27 Counties 2 Midlands West (North) teams in Derbyshire, Staffordshire and the West Midlands
Locations of the 2026-27 Counties 2 Midlands West (North) teams in Herefordshire, Shropshire & Worcestershire

== 2025-26 ==
Departing were Stourbridge Lions (champions) promoted to Counties 1 Midlands West (North) and Bromyard (runner-up) promoted to Counties 1 Midlands West (South). Also leaving were Walsall II (9th) relegated to Counties 3 Midlands West (South) while Oswestry (10th) and Market Drayton (11th) were relegated to Counties 3 Midlands West (North). Harborne (8th) left on a level transfer to Counties 2 Midlands West (East).

Team	Ground	Capacity	City/Area	Previous season
Ashbourne	Recreation Ground		Ashbourne, Derbyshire	Level transfer from Counties 2 Midlands East (North) (3rd)
Bridgnorth Bulls	Edgar Davies Ground		Bridgnorth, Shropshire	5th
Burton 2XV	Battlestead Croft, Tatenhill		Burton, Staffordshire	Relegated from Counties 1 Midlands East (North) (12th)
Clee Hill	Tenbury Road		Cleehill, Shropshire	4th
Leek II	Altrad Park		Cheddleton, Staffordshire	Promoted from Counties 3 Midlands West (North) (champions)
Longton	Trentham Fields		Longton, Stoke-on-Trent, Staffordshire	7th
Luctonians III	Mortimer Park	2,500 (300 seats)	Kingsland, Herefordshire	6th
Newcastle (Staffs) II	Lilleshall Road		Clayton, Newcastle-under-Lyme, Staffordshire	Promoted from Counties 3 Midlands West (North) (runners-up)
Stafford	The County Ground		Stafford, Staffordshire	Relegated from Counties 1 Midlands West (North) (11th)
Trentham	New Inn Lane		Trentham, Stoke-on-Trent, Staffordshire	3rd
Willenhall	Bognop Road		Essington, Staffordshire	Relegated from Counties 1 Midlands West (North) (10th)
Wolverhampton	Castlecroft Road		Castlecroft, Wolverhampton, West Midlands	Relegated from Counties 1 Midlands West (North) (12th)

Locations of the 2025-26 Counties 2 Midlands West (North) teams in Staffordshire and the West Midlands

== 2024-25 ==
Departing were Newport (Salop) 2XV and Willenhall, both promoted to Counties 1 Midlands West (North). Handsworth (11th) and Rugeley (12th) were relegated.

Joining were Harborne, Longton, Trentham and Walsall II.

Tenbury (7th in 2023-24) started but subsequently withdrew from the league leaving eleven teams to contest the remaining fixtures.

=== Participating teams & locations ===
Team	Ground	Capacity	City/Area	Previous season
Bridgnorth Bulls	Edgar Davies Ground		Bridgnorth, Shropshire	10th
Bromyard	Clive Richards Sports Ground		Bromyard, Herefordshire	4th
Clee Hill	Tenbury Road		Cleehill, Shropshire	3rd
Harborne	Metchley Park		Birmingham, West Midlands	Relegated from Counties 2 Midlands West (North)
Longton	Trentham Fields		Longton, Stoke-on-Trent, Staffordshire	Relegated from Counties 2 Midlands West (North)
Luctonians III	Mortimer Park	2,500 (300 seats)	Kingsland, Herefordshire	5th
Market Drayton	Greenfields Lane		Market Drayton, Shropshire	9th
Oswestry	Granville Park		Oswestry, Shropshire	8th
Stourbridge Lions	Stourton Park		Stourbridge, West Midlands	6th
Trentham	New Inn Lane		Trentham, Stoke-on-Trent, Staffordshire	Promoted from Counties 3 Midlands West (North) (Champions)
Walsall II	Broadway Ground	1,150 (150 stand)	Walsall, West Midlands	Level transfer from Counties 2 Midlands West (East)

Locations of the 2024-25 Counties 2 Midlands West (North) teams in Staffordshire and the West Midlands
Locations of the 2024-25 Counties 2 Midlands West (West) teams in Birmingham and the West Midlands

== 2023-24 ==
The league name changed from Counties 2 Midlands West (North) to Counties 2 Midlands West (West) with a corresponding adjustment in the make up of the competing sides.

Departing were Burntwood and Harborne, promoted to Counties 2 Midlands West (North). Aldridge (12th) and Cleobury Mortimer (11th) were relegated. Veseyans left on a level transfer to Counties 2 Midlands West (East).

Joining on a level transfer, were Bromyard and Tenbury from Counties 2 Midlands West (East) together with Rugeley, Willenhall and Stourbridge Lions.

=== Participating teams & locations ===
Team	Ground	Capacity	City/Area	Previous season
Bridgnorth Bulls	Edgar Davies Ground		Bridgnorth, Shropshire	9th
Bromyard	Clive Richards Sports Ground		Bromyard, Herefordshire	Level transfer from Counties 2 Midlands West (East) (6th)
Clee Hill	Tenbury Road		Cleehill, Shropshire	5th
Handsworth	Charles Lewis Memorial Ground		Walsall, West Midlands	10th
Luctonians III	Mortimer Park	2,500 (300 seats)	Kingsland, Herefordshire	8th
Market Drayton	Greenfields Lane		Market Drayton, Shropshire	7th
Newport (Salop) 2XV	The Old Showground		Newport, Shropshire	4th
Oswestry	Granville Park		Oswestry, Shropshire	6th
Rugeley	St Augustine's Field		Rugeley, Staffordshire	Promoted from Counties 3 Midlands West (North) (runners-up)
Stourbridge Lions	Stourton Park		Stourbridge, West Midlands	New entry
Tenbury	Penlu		Tenbury Wells, Worcestershire	Level transfer from Counties 2 Midlands West (East) (4th)
Willenhall	Bognop Road		Essington, Staffordshire	Promoted from Counties 3 Midlands West (North) (Champions)

Locations of the 2023-24 Counties 2 Midlands West (North) teams in Staffordshire and the West Midlands
Locations of the 2023-24 Counties 2 Midlands West (West) teams in the West Midlands

== 2022-23 ==
This was the first season following the RFU Adult Competition Review with the league adopting its new name of Counties 2 Midlands West (North).

Departing were Edwardians, Telford Hornets and Shrewsbury, all promoted to Counties 1 Midlands West (North). Also leaving were Eccleshall (11th) and Linley & Kidsgrove (7th).

Joining were Bridgnorth II, Luctonians III, Market Drayton, Oswestry and Newport (Salop) 2XV.

=== Participating teams & locations ===
Team	Ground	Capacity	City/Area	Previous season
Aldridge	Bourne Vale		Aldridge, West Midlands	10th
Bridgnorth II	Edgar Davies Ground		Bridgnorth, Shropshire	New entry
Burntwood	The Sportsway		Burntwood, Staffordshire	4th
Clee Hill	Tenbury Road		Cleehill, Shropshire	7th
Cleobury Mortimer	Love Lane		Cleobury Mortimer, Shropshire	9th
Handsworth	Charles Lewis Memorial Ground		Walsall, West Midlands	6th
Harborne	Metchley Park		Birmingham, West Midlands	5th
Luctonians III	Mortimer Park	2,500 (300 seats)	Kingsland, Herefordshire	New entry
Market Drayton	Greenfields Lane		Market Drayton, Shropshire	Promoted from Midlands 4 WN
Newport (Salop) 2XV	The Old Showground		Newport, Shropshire	New entry
Oswestry	Granville Park		Oswestry, Shropshire	Promoted from Midlands 4 WN
Veseyans	Memorial Ground		Walsall, West Midlands	8th

Locations of the 2022-23 Counties 2 Midlands West (North) teams in Staffordshire and the West Midlands
Locations of the 2022-23 Counties 2 Midlands West (North) teams in Staffordshire and the West Midlands

== 2021-22 ==
=== Participating teams & locations ===
Team	Ground	Capacity	City/Area	Previous season
Aldridge	Bourne Vale		Aldridge, West Midlands	Promoted from Midlands 4 WN (runners-up)
Burntwood	The Sportsway		Burntwood, Staffordshire	Relegated from Midlands 2 WN (11th)
Clee Hill	Tenbury Road		Cleehill, Shropshire	Promoted from Midlands 4 WN (champions)
Cleobury Mortimer	Love Lane		Cleobury Mortimer, Shropshire	6th
Eccleshall	Baden Hall		Eccleshall, Staffordshire	9th
Edwardians	Memorial Ground		Solihull, West Midlands	5th
Handsworth	Charles Lewis Memorial Ground		Walsall, West Midlands	10th
Harborne	Metchley Park		Birmingham, West Midlands	3rd
Linley & Kidsgrove	Kidsgrove Cricket Club		Kidsgrove, Staffordshire	7th
Shrewsbury	Sundorne Castle		Uffington, Shrewsbury, Shropshire	Relegated from Midlands 2 WN (12th)
Telford Hornets	Hinkshay Road		Telford, Shropshire	8th
Veseyans	Memorial Ground		Walsall, West Midlands	4th

Locations of the 2021-22 Midlands 3 West (North) teams in Staffordshire and the West Midlands
Locations of the 2021-22 Midlands 3 West (North) teams

== 2020–21 ==
Due to the COVID-19 pandemic, the 2020–21 season was cancelled.

== 2019–20 ==
=== Participating teams & locations ===
Team	Ground	Capacity	City/Area	Previous season
Cleobury Mortimer	Love Lane		Cleobury Mortimer, Shropshire	9th
Eccleshall	Baden Hall		Eccleshall, Staffordshire	7th
Edwardians	Memorial Ground		Solihull, West Midlands	4th
Handsworth	Charles Lewis Memorial Ground		Walsall, West Midlands	10th
Harborne	Metchley Park		Birmingham, West Midlands	6th
Linley & Kidsgrove	Kidsgrove Cricket Club		Kidsgrove, Staffordshire	Promoted from Midlands 4 WN (champions)
Old Saltleians	Watton Lane		Water Orton, Warwickshire	3rd
Telford Hornets	Hinkshay Road		Telford, Shropshire	Relegated from Midlands 2 WN (12th)
Uttoxeter	Oldfields Sports & Social Club	2,000	Uttoxeter, Staffordshire	5th
Veseyans	Memorial Ground		Walsall, West Midlands	Relegated from Midlands 2 WN (11th)
Wednesbury	Woden Road North		Wednesbury, West Midlands	8th
Willenhall	Bognop Road		Essington, Staffordshire	Promoted from Midlands 4 WN (runners up)

Locations of the 2019–20 Midlands 3 West (North) teams in Staffordshire and the West Midlands
Locations of the 2019–20 Midlands 3 West (North) teams in Shropshire

== 2018–19 ==
=== Participating teams & locations ===
Team	Ground	Capacity	City/Area	Previous season
Burntwood	The Sportsway		Burntwood, Staffordshire	3rd
Cannock	Morgan Ground		Huntington, Cannock Chase, Staffordshire	6th
Cleobury Mortimer	Love Lane		Cleobury Mortimer, Shropshire	Relegated from Midlands 2 West (North) (12th)
Eccleshall	Baden Hall		Eccleshall, Staffordshire	Promoted from Midlands 4 West (North) (champions)
Edwardians	Memorial Ground		Solihull, West Midlands	7th
Handsworth	Charles Lewis Memorial Ground		Walsall, West Midlands	9th
Harborne	Metchley Park		Birmingham, West Midlands	5th
Old Saltleians	Watton Lane		Water Orton, Warwickshire	Relegated from Midlands 2 West (North) (11th)
Shrewsbury	Sundorne Castle		Uffington, Shrewsbury, Shropshire	4th
Trentham	New Inn Lane		Trentham, Stoke-on-Trent, Staffordshire	10th
Uttoxeter	Oldfields Sports & Social Club	2,000	Uttoxeter, Staffordshire	8th
Wednesbury	Woden Road North		Wednesbury, West Midlands	Promoted from Midlands 4 West (North) (runners up)

Locations of the 2018–19 Midlands 3 West (North) teams

== 2017–18 ==
=== Participating teams & locations ===
Team	Ground	Capacity	City/Area	Previous season
Barton-under-Needwood	Holland Sports Club		Barton-under-Needwood, Staffordshire	Promoted from Midlands 4 West (North) (runners up)
Burntwood	The Sportsway		Burntwood, Staffordshire	3rd
Cannock	Morgan Ground		Huntington, Cannock Chase, Staffordshire	10th
Edwardians	Memorial Ground		Solihull, West Midlands	6th
Handsworth	Charles Lewis Memorial Ground		Walsall, West Midlands	4th
Harborne	Metchley Park		Birmingham, West Midlands	8th
Shrewsbury	Sundorne Castle		Uffington, Shrewsbury, Shropshire	Relegated from Midlands 2 West (North) (11th)
Stafford	The County Ground		Stafford, Staffordshire	Relegated from Midlands 2 West (North) (10th)
Telford Hornets	Hinkshay Road		Telford, Shropshire	7th
Trentham	New Inn Lane		Trentham, Stoke-on-Trent, Staffordshire	Promoted from Midlands 4 West (North) (champions)
Uttoxeter	Oldfields Sports & Social Club	2,000	Uttoxeter, Staffordshire	5th
Willenhall	Bognop Road		Essington, Staffordshire	9th

Locations of the 2017–18 Midlands 3 West (North) teams

== Teams 2016-17 ==
- Burntwood
- Cannock
- Clee Hill
- Cleobury Mortimer
- Eccleshall
- Edwardians
- Handsworth (relegated from Midlands 2 West (North))
- Harborne (relegated from Midlands 2 West (North))
- Ludlow
- Telford Hornets (promoted from Midlands 4 West (North))
- Uttoxeter (promoted from Midlands 4 West (North))
- Willenhall

== Teams 2015-16 ==
- Bloxwich
- Burntwood
- Cannock (promoted from Midlands 4 West (North))
- Clee Hill
- Cleobury Mortimer (promoted from Midlands 4 West (North))
- Eccleshall
- Edwardians
- Ludlow (relegated from Midlands 2 West (North))
- Newcastle (Staffs)
- Tamworth (relegated from Midlands 2 West (North))
- Wednesbury
- Willenhall

== Teams 2014-15 ==
- Aston Old Edwardians (relegated from Midlands 2 West (North))
- Bloxwich
- Burntwood
- Clee Hill (promoted from Midlands 4 West (North))
- Eccleshall
- Edwardians
- Handsworth
- Harborne (promoted from Midlands 4 West (North))
- Newcastle (Staffs)
- Uttoxeter
- Wednesbury
- Willenhall (relegated from Midlands 2 West (North))

== Teams 2013-14 ==
- Bloxwich
- Burntwood
- Eccleshall
- Edwardians
- Handsworth
- Market Drayton (promoted from Midlands 4 West (North))
- Newcastle (Staffs)
- Shrewsbury
- Uttoxeter (promoted from Midlands 4 West (North))
- Veseyans (relegated from Midlands 2 West (North))
- Wednesbury
- Yardley & District

== Teams 2012–13 ==
- Bloxwich
- Burntwood
- Cleobury Mortimer
- Eccleshall
- Edwardians
- Handsworth
- Newcastle (Staffs)
- Shrewsbury
- Stourbridge Lions
- Wednesbury
- Willenhall
- Yardley & District

== Teams 2010–11 ==
- Bishops Castle & Onny Valley
- Burntwood
- Eccleshall
- Handsworth
- Moseley Oak
- Newcastle (Staffs)
- Telford
- Uttoxeter
- Veseyans
- Wednesbury
- Wolverhampton
- Yardley & District

== Original teams ==
Teams in Midlands 3 West (North) and Midlands 3 West (South) were originally part of a single division called Midlands 2 West, which contained the following sides when it was introduced in 1992:

- Aston Old Edwardians - promoted from North Midlands 1 (10th)
- Coventry Welsh - promoted from Staffordshire/Warwickshire 1 (10th)
- Dixonians - promoted from North Midlands 1 (6th)
- Handsworth - promoted from Staffordshire 1 (champions)
- Kenilworth - promoted from Staffordshire/Warwickshire 1 (7th)
- Nuneaton Old Edwardians - promoted from Staffordshire/Warwickshire 1 (6th)
- Old Laurentians - promoted from Warwickshire 1 (champions)
- Selly Oak (Note: Selly Oak are currently known as Moseley Oak - the amateur side affiliated with Birmingham Moseley Rugby Club.) - promoted from North Midlands 2 (champions)
- Shrewsbury - promoted from North Midlands 1 (11th)
- Stratford-upon-Avon - promoted from Staffordshire/Warwickshire 1 (9th)
- Tamworth - promoted from Staffordshire/Warwickshire 1 (8th)
- West Midlands Police - promoted from North Midlands 1 (8th)
- Woodrush - promoted from North Midlands 1 (7th)

== Midlands 3 West (North) honours ==
=== Midlands West 2 (1992–1993) ===
Midlands 3 West (North) and Midlands 3 West (South) were originally part of a single tier 8 division called Midlands West 2. Promotion was to Midlands West 1 and relegation was to either North Midlands 1 or Staffordshire/Warwickshire 1.

Midlands West 2
Season	No of teams	Champions	Runners–up	Relegated teams	Reference
1992–93	13	Nuneaton Old Edwardians	Aston Old Edwardians	Handsworth	
Green backgrounds are the promotion places.

=== Midlands West 2 (1993–1996) ===
The top six teams from Midlands 1 and the top six from North 1 were combined to create National 5 North, meaning that Midlands 2 West dropped to become a tier 9 league. Promotion continued to Midlands West 1 while relegation was to either North Midlands 1 or Staffordshire/Warwickshire 1.

Midlands West 2
Season	No of teams	Champions	Runners–up	Relegated teams	Reference
1993–94	13	Old Laurentians	Newport (Salop)	No relegation	
1994–95	13	Luctonians	Kenilworth	Coventry Welsh, Dunlop	
1995–96	13	Selly Oak	Malvern (Note: Due to the cancellation of National 5 North at the end of the season, nine clubs were promoted including Old Coventrians, Ludlow, Stratford-upon-Avon, Nuneaton Old Edwardians, Tamworth, Stoke Old Boys and Dixonians.)	No relegation (Note: Due to widespread restructuring caused by the cancellation of National 5 North there was no relegation.)	
Green backgrounds are the promotion places.

=== Midlands West 2 (1996–2000) ===
At the end of the 1995–96 season National 5 North was discontinued and Midlands West 2 returned to being a tier 8 league. Promotion continued to Midlands West 1 while relegation was to either North Midlands 1 or Staffordshire/Warwickshire 1.

Midlands West 2
Season	No of teams	Champions	Runners–up	Relegated teams	Reference
1996–97	17	Telford Hornets	Woodrush	Trinity Guild, Newcastle (Staffs), Rugby St Andrews	
1997–98	17	Shrewsbury	Evesham	Coventry Saracens	
1998–99	17	Newcastle (Staffs)	Birmingham Exiles	Manor Park, GPT Coventry, Warley	(Note: Midlands West 2 is mistakenly referred to as Midlands 4 East (South) on RFU website for 1998–99 season.)
1999–00	17	Kidderminster Carolians (Note: Champions Kidderminster Carolians would be promoted into the new Midlands 3 West (North).)	Old Yardleians (Note: Due to Midlands league restructuring four clubs would be promoted including Old Yardleians (2nd) and Leek (4th) who would go into Midlands 3 West (North), while Nuneaton Old Edwardians (3rd) would go into Midlands 3 West (South).)	No relegation (Note: As Midlands West 2 was to split up into two regional leagues there was no relegation. Clubs that were not promoted were transferred into either Midlands 4 West (North) or Midlands 4 West (South).)	(Note: Midlands West 2 is mistakenly referred to as Midlands 4 East (South) on RFU website for 1999–00 season.)
Green backgrounds are the promotion places.

=== Midlands 4 West (North) (2000–2004) ===
Restructuring ahead of the 2000–01 season saw Midlands West 2 split into two tier 8 regional leagues - Midlands 4 West (North) and Midlands 4 West (South). Promotion was now to Midlands 3 West (North) (Note: Prior to the 2000–01 season Midlands 3 West (North) and Midlands 3 West (South) were part of a Midlands West 1.) and relegation to either North Midlands 1 or Staffordshire 1. (Note: Staffordshire/Warwickshire 1 was split into Staffordshire 1 and Warwickshire 1 at the end of the 1999–00 season.)

Midlands 4 West North
Season	No of teams	Champions	Runners–up	Relegated teams	Reference
2000–01	10	Bridgnorth	Lordswood Dixonians	Warley, Edwardians	
2001–02	10	Burntwood	Willenhall	Wheaton Aston, Cleobury Mortimer, Handsworth	
2002–03	10	Telford Hornets	Old Saltleians	No relegation	
2003–04	10	Wednesbury	Newport (Salop)	Handsworth, Uttoxeter	
Green backgrounds are promotion places.

=== Midlands 4 West (North) (2004–2006) ===
At the start of the 2004–05 season Midlands 4 West (North) remained at tier 8 of the league system, with promotion continuing to Midlands 3 West (North). However, the restructuring of the leagues below meant that relegation was now to either North Midlands (North) (Note: North Midlands 1 was divided into North Midlands (North) and North Midlands (South) 1 at the start of the 2004–05 season.) or Staffordshire (Note: Formerly Staffordshire 1.)

Midlands 4 West North
Season	No of teams	Champions	Runners–up	Relegated teams	Reference
2004–05	10	Newcastle (Staffs)	Ludlow	Yardley & District, Selly Oak	
2005–06	10	Old Saltleians	Burntwood	No relegation (Note: No relegation as the division would be increased from 10 to 12 teams for the following season.)	
Green backgrounds are promotion places.

=== Midlands 4 West (North) (2006–2009) ===
At the start of the 2006–07 season Midlands 4 West (North) remained at tier 8 of the league system, with promotion continuing to Midlands 3 West (North). The cancellation of the Staffordshire league meant that relegation was now to the newly introduced Midlands 5 West (North).

Midlands 4 West North
Season	No of teams	Champions	Runners–up	Relegated teams	Reference
2006–07	12	Leek	Lordswood Dixonians	Old Griffinians, Aldridge	
2007–08	12	Old Halesonians	Bournville	Telford Hornets, Harborne	
2008–09	12	Willenhall	Shrewsbury	Cleobury Mortimer	
Green backgrounds are promotion places.

=== Midlands 3 West (North) (2009–present) ===
League restructuring by the RFU meant that Midlands 4 West (North) and Midlands 4 West (South) were renamed as Midlands 3 West (North) and Midlands 3 West (South), with both leagues remaining at tier 8. Promotion was now to Midlands 2 West (North) (formerly Midlands 3 West (North)) and relegation to Midlands 4 West (North) (formerly Midlands 5 West (North)).

Midlands 4 West North
Season	No of teams	Champions	Runners–up	Relegated teams	Reference
2009–10	12	Leek	Tamworth	Bloxwich	
2010–11	12	Burntwood	Moseley Oak	Bishop's Castle & Onny Valley, Telford Hornets	
2011–12	12	Veseyans	Wolverhampton	Harborne, Uttoxeter	
2012–13	12	Willenhall	Stourbridge Lions	Cleobury Mortimer, Eccleshall	
2013–14	12	Veseyans	Shrewsbury	Market Drayton, Yardley & District	
2014–15	12	Handsworth	Harborne	Aston Old Edwardians, Uttoxeter	
2015–16	12	Tamworth	Newcastle (Staffs)	Bloxwich, Wednesbury	
2016–17	12	Ludlow	Cleobury Mortimer	Eccleshall, Clee Hill	
2017–18	12	Telford Hornets	Stafford	Barton-Under-Needwood, Willenhall	
2018–19	12	Shrewsbury	Burntwood	Cannock, Trentham	
2019–20	12	Uttoxeter	Old Saltleians	Willenhall, Wednesbury	
2020–21	12				
Green backgrounds are promotion places.

== Number of league titles ==
- Telford Hornets (3) (Note: One of Telford Hornets titles was won when division was unified as Midlands West 2.)
- Burntwood (2)
- Leek (2)
- Newcastle (Staffs) (2) (Note: One of Newcastle (Staffs) titles was won when division was unified as Midlands West 2.)
- Shrewsbury (2) (Note: One of Shrewsbury titles was won when division was unified as Midlands West 2.)
- Veseyans (2)
- Willenhall (2)
- Bridgnorth (1)
- Handsworth (1)
- Kidderminster Carolians (1) (Note: Kidderminster Carolians title was won when division was unified as Midlands West 2.)
- Ludlow (1)
- Luctonians (1) (Note: Luctonians title was when league was single division known as Midlands West 2.)
- Nuneaton Old Edwardians (1) (Note: Nuneaton Old Edwardians title was when league was single division known as Midlands West 2.)
- Old Halesonians (1)
- Old Laurentians (1) (Note: Old Laurentians title was when league was single division known as Midlands West 2.)
- Old Saltleians (1)
- Selly Oak (1) (Note: Selly Oak's title was when league was single division known as Midlands West 2.)
- Tamworth (1)
- Uttoxeter (1)
- Wednesbury (1)

== See also ==
- Midlands RFU
- North Midlands RFU
- Staffordshire RU
- English rugby union system
- Rugby union in England
