= Kenneth Wright (rugby union) =

- Born: Kenneth Moncrieff Wright; 6 September 1905 Kolkata, India
- Died: 1 August 1984 (aged 78) Saint Peter Port, Guernsey

Rugby union career
- Position: Flanker
Amateur team(s)
Years	Team	Apps	(Points)
1923	Cheltenham College		
- London Scottish
1927-30	Army Rugby Union		
1938	Stoke on Trent		
Provincial / State sides
Years	Team	Apps	(Points)
1929	Anglo-Scots		
1929-30	Kent		
International career
Years	Team	Apps	(Points)
1929	Scotland	4	(0)

Kenneth Wright (6 September 1905 – 1 August 1984) was a Scotland international rugby union player.

== Rugby Union career ==
=== Amateur career ===
He was captain of the Cheltenham College team.

Wright played for London Scottish.

He played for the Army Rugby Union from 1927 to 1930.

In January 1938 he started playing for Stoke-on-Trent.

=== Provincial career ===
He was picked for the Anglo-Scots side to play the Provinces District on 21 December 1929.

He played for Kent from 1929 to 1930.

=== International career ===
He was capped four times for Scotland in 1929.

== Military career ==
He went to the Royal Military Academy in Woolwich. He joined the 12th Field Brigade in India, and then appointed to an Indian Field Brigade at Bangalore 4 years later. He moved back to England where he was promoted to captain. He was posted to the 27th Field Brigade at Colchester.

== Family ==
He was a son of E. Wright of Guernsey.
