= Regional 2 North Midlands =

English Rugby Union Regional League

Regional 2 Midlands North
- Current season or competition: 2025–26 Regional 2 Midlands North
- Sport: Rugby union
- Instituted: 2022; 4 years ago
- Number of teams: 12
- Country: England
- Holders: Lichfield (2024–25)
- Most titles: Leek, Lichfield, Long Eaton (1 title)

Regional 2 Midlands North is an English level 6 rugby union regional league for rugby clubs in the North Midlands including sides from Leicestershire, Notts, Lincs & Derbyshire, Staffordshire and Warwickshire. It was created following the 2022 Adult Competition Review by the Rugby Football Union (RFU).

The 2024–25 champions are Lichfield.

== Structure and format ==
The twelve teams play home and away matches from September through to April, making a total of twenty-two matches each. The results of the matches contribute points to the league table as follows:

- 4 points are awarded for a win
- 2 points are awarded for a draw
- 0 points are awarded for a loss, however
- 1 losing (bonus) point is awarded to a team that loses a match by 7 points or fewer
- 1 additional (bonus) point is awarded to a team scoring 4 tries or more in a match

There is one automatic promotion place and two relegation places. The first-placed team at the end of season wins promotion to Regional 1 Midlands. Relegation is to Counties 1 Midlands West (North) or Counties 1 Midlands East (North) depending on location.

== 2026-27 ==
Departing were Dronfield promoted to Regional 1 North East while Newark (11th) and Belgrave (12th) were relegated to Counties 1 Midlands East (North). Also leaving were Old Salteians (10th) on a level transfer to Regional 2 East Midlands.

Team	Ground	Capacity	City/Area	Previous season
Derby	Haslams Lane		Derby, Derbyshire	Relegated from Regional 1 North West
Ilkeston	The Stute		Ilkeston, Derbyshire	7th
Long Eaton	West Park	1,000	Long Eaton, Derbyshire	Relegated from Regional 1 North West
Matlock	Cromford Meadows		Cromford, Matlock, Derbyshire	8th
Melbourne	Cockshut Lane	2,000	Melbourne, Derbyshire	4th
Nottingham University	Lady Bay Sports Ground		West Bridgford, Nottingham, Nottinghamshire	Promoted from Counties 1 Midlands East (North)
Paviors	The Ron Rossin Ground		Nottingham, Nottinghamshire	10th
Stoke-on-Trent	Hartwell Lane	2,000	Barlaston, Staffordshire	5th
Sutton Coldfield	Roger Smoldon Ground		Sutton Coldfield, West Midlands	6th
Walsall	Broadway Ground	1,150 (150 stand)	Walsall, West Midlands	3rd
West Bridgford	The Memorial Ground		West Bridgford, Nottinghamshire	2nd
Whitchurch	Edgeley Park		Whitchurch, Shropshire	Promoted from Counties 1 Midlands West (North) (Champions)

Locations of the 2026-27 Regional 2 North Midlands teams in Shropshire, Staffordshire & the West Midlands
Locations of the 2026-27 Regional 2 North Midlands teams in Derbyshire & Nottinghamshire

== 2025–26 ==
Departing were Lichfield promoted to Regional 1 Midlands while Mellish and Tamworth were relegated to Counties 1 Midlands East (North) and Counties 1 Midlands West (North) respectively. Promoted to this league were Belgrave and Sutton Coldfield, champions of Counties 1 Midlands East (North) and Counties 1 Midlands West (North) respectively.

Team	Ground	Capacity	City/Area	Previous season
Belgrave	Belgrave Pastures		Belgrave, Leicester, Leicestershire	Promoted from Counties 1 Midlands East (North)
Dronfield	Gosforth Fields		Dronfield Woodhouse, Dronfield, Derbyshire	2nd
Ilkeston	The Stute		Ilkeston, Derbyshire	7th
Matlock	Cromford Meadows		Cromford, Matlock, Derbyshire	10th
Melbourne	Cockshut Lane	2,000	Melbourne, Derbyshire	3rd
Newark	The Rugby Ground	1,000 (60 seats)	Newark-on-Trent, Nottinghamshire	6th
Old Saltleians	Watton Lane		Water Orton, Warwickshire	9th
Paviors	The Ron Rossin Ground		Nottingham, Nottinghamshire	8th
Stoke-on-Trent	Hartwell Lane	2,000	Barlaston, Staffordshire	Relegated from Regional 1 North West (11th)
Sutton Coldfield	Roger Smoldon Ground		Sutton Coldfield, West Midlands	Promoted from Counties 1 Midlands West (North)
Walsall	Broadway Ground	1,150 (150 stand)	Walsall, West Midlands	4th
West Bridgford	The Memorial Ground		West Bridgford, Nottinghamshire	5th

Locations of the 2025–26 Regional 2 North Midlands teams

=== League table ===
Regional 2 North Midlands 2025–26
	Team	Played	Won	Drawn	Lost	Points for	Points against	Points diff	Try bonus	Loss bonus	Points	Play offs
1	Dronfield (P)	22	20	0	2	807	302	505	18	2	100	Promoted
2	West Bridgford	22	18	0	4	926	479	447	20	2	94	Promotion play-off
3	Walsall	22	16	0	6	739	507	232	15	3	82	Promotion play-off
4	Melbourne	22	14	0	8	683	511	172	14	1	71	Promotion play-off
5	Stoke-on-Trent	22	10	0	12	557	649	−92	13	5	58	Promotion play-off
6	Sutton Coldfield RFC	22	9	0	13	593	652	−59	14	4	54	
7	Ilkeston	22	9	0	13	546	693	−147	14	4	54	
8	Matlock	22	9	0	13	517	593	−76	10	4	50	
9	Paviors	22	8	0	14	590	677	−87	12	2	46	
10	Old Saltleians	22	8	0	14	466	719	−253	10	2	44	Relegation play-off
11	Newark (R)	22	7	0	15	460	613	−153	7	7	42	Relegation play-off
12	Belgrave (R)	22	4	0	18	415	904	−489	7	3	26	Relegated
If teams are level at any stage, tiebreakers are applied in the following order: 1. Number of matches won 2. Number of draws 3. Difference between points for and against 4. Total number of points for 5. Aggregate number of points scored in matches between tied teams 6. Number of matches won excluding the first match, then the second and so on until the tie is settled
Updated: 7 May 2026; Source:

== 2024–25 ==
=== Participating teams and locations ===
Departing, were the champions, Long Eaton promoted to Regional 1 Midlands. Sutton Coldfield (11th) and Wolverhampton (12th) were relegated. Joining were Old Saltleians promoted from Counties 1 Midlands West (North) and Ilkeston promoted from Counties 1 Midlands East (North) as runners-up (Hinckley Staghounds (2XV) finished top but owing to league regulations were not permitted to be promoted to Level 7). The league was completed with the addition of Dronfield on a level transfer from Regional 2 North East.

Team	Ground	Capacity	City/Area	Previous season
Dronfield	Gosforth Fields		Dronfield Woodhouse, Dronfield, Derbyshire	Level transfer from Regional 2 North East
Ilkeston	The Stute		Ilkeston, Derbyshire	Promoted from Counties 1 Midlands East (North) (2nd)
Lichfield	Cooke Fields	5,460 (460 seats)	Lichfield, Staffordshire	2nd
Matlock	Cromford Meadows		Cromford, Matlock, Derbyshire	9th
Melbourne	Cockshut Lane	2,000	Melbourne, Derbyshire	4th
Mellish	War Memorial Ground		Arnold, Nottingham, Nottinghamshire	10th
Newark	The Rugby Ground	1,000 (60 seats)	Newark-on-Trent, Nottinghamshire	8th
Old Saltleians	Watton Lane		Water Orton, Warwickshire	Promoted from Counties 1 Midlands West (North) (2nd)
Paviors	The Ron Rossin Ground		Nottingham, Nottinghamshire	5th
Tamworth	Wigginton Park		Tamworth, Staffordshire	6th
Walsall	Broadway Ground	1,150 (150 stand)	Walsall, West Midlands	7th
West Bridgford	The Memorial Ground		West Bridgford, Nottinghamshire	3rd

Locations of the 2024–25 Regional 2 North Midlands teams

=== League table ===
Regional 2 North Midlands 2024–25
	Team	Played	Won	Drawn	Lost	Points for	Points against	Points diff	Try bonus	Loss bonus	Points
1	Lichfield (P)	22	20	0	2	921	385	536	18	1	99
2	Dronfield	22	20	0	2	857	308	549	15	0	95
3	Melbourne	22	17	0	5	792	487	305	15	1	84
4	Walsall	22	13	1	8	845	545	300	15	3	67
5	West Bridgford	22	12	1	9	700	554	146	15	2	67
6	Newark	22	11	1	10	667	614	53	11	2	59
7	Ilkeston	22	8	0	14	737	635	102	15	7	54
8	Paviors	22	9	1	12	632	630	2	11	3	52
9	Old Saltleians	22	8	1	13	506	568	−62	10	5	49
10	Matlock	22	8	1	13	539	657	−118	10	4	48
11	Mellish (R)	22	1	0	21	333	1096	−763	5	4	13
12	Tamworth (R)	22	2	0	20	236	1286	−1050	2	1	11
If teams are level at any stage, tiebreakers are applied in the following order: 1. Number of matches won 2. Number of draws 3. Difference between points for and against 4. Total number of points for 5. Aggregate number of points scored in matches between tied teams 6. Number of matches won excluding the first match, then the second and so on until the tie is settled
Green background is the promotion place. Pink background are the relegation places. Updated: 25 October 2025; Source:

== 2023–24 ==
=== Participating teams and locations ===
Departing were Leek, promoted to Regional 1 North West. Belgrave (11th) and Nuneaton Old Edwardians (12th) were relegated. Also leaving the league were Moseley Oak and Silhillians who went on a level transfer to Regional 2 West Midlands as did Leicester Forest and Oadby Wyggestonians to Regional 2 East Midlands.

Joining were Lichfield, relegated from Regional 1 Midlands together with Paviors and West Bridgford, both relegated from Regional 1 North East (12th). Coming up were Tamworth promoted from Counties 1 Midlands West (North) as runners-up (Luctonians 2XV finished top but owing to league regulations were not permitted to be promoted to Level 6) and Mellish promoted from Counties 1 Midlands East (North) as runner-up (Hinckley Staghounds (2XV) finished top but were similarly not permitted to be promoted). The league was completed by Wolverhampton and Walsall both on a level transfer from Regional 2 East Midlands.

Team	Ground	Capacity	City/Area	Previous season
Lichfield	Cooke Fields	5,460 (460 seats)	Lichfield, Staffordshire	Relegated from Regional 1 Midlands (12th)
Long Eaton	West Park	1,000	Long Eaton, Derbyshire	2nd
Matlock	Cromford Meadows		Cromford, Matlock, Derbyshire	7th
Melbourne	Cockshut Lane	2,000	Melbourne, Derbyshire	4th
Mellish	War Memorial Ground		Arnold, Nottingham, Nottinghamshire	Promoted from Counties 1 Midlands East (North) (2nd)
Newark	The Rugby Ground	1,000 (60 seats)	Newark-on-Trent, Nottinghamshire	6th
Paviors	The Ron Rossin Ground		Nottingham, Nottinghamshire	Relegated from Regional 1 North East (11th)
Sutton Coldfield	Roger Smoldon Ground		Sutton Coldfield, West Midlands	5th
Tamworth	Wigginton Park		Tamworth, Staffordshire	Promoted from Counties 1 Midlands West (North) (2nd)
Walsall	Broadway Ground	1,150 (150 stand)	Walsall, West Midlands	Level transfer from Regional 2 East Midlands
West Bridgford	The Memorial Ground		West Bridgford, Nottinghamshire	Relegated from Regional 1 North East (12th)
Wolverhampton	Castlecroft Road		Castlecroft, Wolverhampton, West Midlands	Level transfer from Regional 2 East Midlands

Locations of the 2023–24 Regional 2 North Midlands teams

=== League table ===
Regional 2 North Midlands 2023–24
	Team	Played	Won	Drawn	Lost	Points for	Points against	Points diff	Try bonus	Loss bonus	Points
1	Long Eaton (P)	22	18	1	3	705	450	255	17	2	92
2	Lichfield	22	17	2	3	755	391	364	15	1	86
3	West Bridgford	22	15	0	7	719	458	261	16	4	80
4	Melbourne	22	14	1	7	596	511	85	13	2	73
5	Paviors	22	13	0	9	637	583	54	16	4	72
6	Tamworth	22	14	0	8	593	474	119	10	2	68
7	Walsall	22	12	0	10	603	586	17	10	2	60
8	Newark	22	11	0	11	535	624	−89	11	3	59
9	Matlock	22	6	0	16	461	569	−108	10	7	42
10	Mellish	22	4	0	18	439	754	−315	8	9	33
11	Sutton Coldfield (R)	22	5	0	17	515	753	−238	10	6	31
12	Wolverhampton (R)	22	1	0	21	383	788	−405	5	7	11
If teams are level at any stage, tiebreakers are applied in the following order: 1. Number of matches won 2. Number of draws 3. Difference between points for and against 4. Total number of points for 5. Aggregate number of points scored in matches between tied teams 6. Number of matches won excluding the first match, then the second and so on until the tie is settled
Green background is the promotion place. Pink background are the relegation places. Updated: 6 December 2024; Source:

== 2022–23 ==
=== Participating teams and locations ===
This was the first season following the RFU Adult Competition Review. Nine teams were drawn from various level 7 Midlands leagues with three teams dropping from Midlands 1 East.

Team	Ground	Capacity	City/Area	Previous season
Belgrave	Belgrave Pastures		Belgrave, Leicester, Leicestershire	9th Midlands 1 East
Leek	Post and Time Park		Cheddleton, Staffordshire	1st Midlands 2 West (North)
Leicester Forest	Hinckley Road		Leicester Forest East, Leicestershire	1st Midlands 2 East (South)
Long Eaton	West Park	1,000	Long Eaton, Derbyshire	1st Midlands 2 East (North)
Matlock	Cromford Meadows		Cromford, Matlock, Derbyshire	3rd Midlands 2 East (North)
Melbourne	Cockshut Lane	2,000	Melbourne, Derbyshire	2nd Midlands 2 East (North)
Moseley Oak	Billesley Common	5,000 (1,300 seats)	Moseley, Birmingham, West Midlands	3rd Midlands 2 West (North)
Newark	The Rugby Ground	1,000 (60 seats)	Newark-on-Trent, Nottinghamshire	4th Midlands 2 East (North)
Nuneaton Old Edwardians	Weddington Road		Nuneaton, Warwickshire	1st Midlands 2 West (South)
Oadby Wyggestonians	Oval Park		Oadby, Leicestershire	10th Midlands 1 East
Silhillians	The Memorial Ground		Solihull, West Midlands	3rd Midlands 2 West (South)
Sutton Coldfield	Roger Smoldon Ground		Sutton Coldfield, West Midlands	10th Midlands 1 West

Locations of the 2022−23 Regional 2 North Midlands teams

=== League table ===
Regional 2 North Midlands 2022–23
	Team	Played	Won	Drawn	Lost	Points for	Points against	Points diff	Try bonus	Loss bonus	Points
1	Leek (P)	22	19	0	3	721	364	357	15	3	94
2	Long Eaton	22	16	0	6	686	523	163	15	2	81
3	Moseley Oak	22	13	1	8	571	446	125	10	4	69
4	Melbourne	22	12	3	7	529	515	14	10	3	67
5	Sutton Coldfield	22	11	2	9	628	680	−52	15	3	66
6	Newark	22	11	1	10	674	625	49	13	6	65
7	Matlock	22	10	1	11	572	507	65	13	6	61
8	Oadby Wyggestonians	22	10	1	11	637	691	−54	12	2	56
9	Leicester Forest	22	8	0	14	613	625	−12	17	4	53
10	Silhillians	22	8	0	14	521	581	−60	11	7	50
11	Belgrave (R)	22	6	0	16	433	630	−197	7	3	29
12	Nuneaton Old Edwardians (R)	22	3	1	18	336	734	−398	6	4	24
If teams are level at any stage, tiebreakers are applied in the following order: 1. Number of matches won 2. Number of draws 3. Difference between points for and against 4. Total number of points for 5. Aggregate number of points scored in matches between tied teams 6. Number of matches won excluding the first match, then the second and so on until the tie is settled
Green background is the promotion place. Pink background are the relegation places. Updated: 30 October 2024; Source:

== Regional 2 North Midlands honours ==
List of Regional 2 North Midlands honours
Season	No of teams	Champions	Runner–up	Relegated teams	Ref
2022–23	12	Leek	Long Eaton	Belgrave and Nuneaton Old Edwardians	
2023–24	12	Long Eaton	Lichfield	Sutton Coldfield and Wolverhampton	
2024–25	12	Lichfield	Dronfield	Mellish and Tamworth	
Green background is the promotion place.

== See also ==
- East Midlands
- Leicestershire
- North Midlands
- Notts, Lincs & Derbyshire
- Staffordshire
- Warwickshire
- English rugby union system
- Rugby union in England
