= Regional 1 North West =

Level five rugby union league in England

- Current season or competition: 2025–26 Regional 1 North West
- Sport: Rugby union
- Instituted: 2022
- Number of teams: 12
- Country: England
- Holders: Huddersfield (2025–26)
- Most titles: Lymm; Macclesfield; Rossendale; Huddersfield (1 title)
- Website: Northern Division

Regional 1 North West is a level five league in the English rugby union system, with the twelve teams drawn from across North West England. The other level five leagues are Regional 1 Midlands, Regional 1 North East, Regional 1 South Central, Regional 1 South East and Regional 1 South West.

Huddersfield are the 2025–26 champions and will be promoted to National League 2 North.

== Format ==
The twelve teams in this league are drawn from across North West England, with the league champions promoted to National League 2 North. The league's bottom two teams are relegated to either Regional 2 North or Regional 2 North West depending on their geographic location.

The season runs from September to April and comprises twenty-two rounds of matches, with each club playing each of its rivals home and away. The results of the matches contribute points to the league table as follows:

- 4 points are awarded for a win
- 2 points are awarded for a draw
- 0 points are awarded for a loss, however
- 1 losing (bonus) point is awarded to a team that loses a match by 7 points or fewer
- 1 additional (bonus) point is awarded to a team scoring 4 tries or more in a match

== 2026–27 ==
Departing were Huddersfield, promoted to National League 2 North, whilst Manchester (9th - playoff losers) were relegated to Regional 2 North West as were Long Eaton (11th) and Derby (12th) both to Regional 2 Midlands North.

Also leaving were Burton (4th) who were originally allocated to the league but subsequently level transferred to Regional 1 Midlands having been displaced by Macclesfield who were involuntarily demoted into the league having declined their allocation to National League 2 West for the 2026-27 season.

Sandal were originally level transferred into the league from Regional 1 North East when the provisional lineup was announced before being switched back to R1NE. In their place came Dronfield, promoted as champions of Regional 2 North Midlands who had initially been allocated to R1NE.

=== Participating teams and locations ===
Team	Ground	Capacity	City/Area	Previous season
Anselmians	Malone Field		Eastham, Wirral	2nd
Blackburn	Ramsgreave Drive		Blackburn, Lancashire	6th
Bowdon	Clay Lane		Timperley, Altrincham, Greater Manchester	7th
Dronfield	Gosforth Fields		Dronfield Woodhouse, Dronfield, Derbyshire	Promoted from Regional 2 North Midlands (champions)
Kendal	Mint Bridge Stadium	3,500 (258 seats)	Kendal, Cumbria	Level transfer from Regional 1 North East (8th)
Leek	Altrad Park		Cheddleton, Staffordshire	5th
Macclesfield	Priory Park	1,250 (250 seats)	Macclesfield, Cheshire	Relegated from National League 2 North (3rd)
Rochdale	Moorgate Avenue		Rochdale, Greater Manchester	8th
Rossendale	Marl Pits	1,100 (100 stand)	Rawtenstall, Rossendale, Lancashire	Relegated from National League 2 North (12th - play off losers)
Stockport	The Memorial Ground	500	Bramhall, Stockport, Greater Manchester	3rd
Vale of Lune	Powder House Lane	4,000 (50 seats)	Lancaster, Lancashire	Promoted from Regional 2NW (Runners-up)
Wirral	The Memorial Ground		Clatterbridge, Wirral	10th

Locations of the 2026–27 Regional 1 North West teams
Locations of the 2026-27 Regional 1 North West teams in Greater Manchester

== 2025–26 ==
Departing were Rossendale, promoted to National League 2 North, whilst Stoke-on-Trent (11th) and Birkenhead Park (12th) were relegated to Regional 2 Midlands North and Regional 2 North West respectively. Also leaving were Penrith (7th) and Kendal (9th) on a level transfer to Regional 1 North East; as were Newport (Salop) (6th) to Regional 1 Midlands.

=== Participating teams and locations ===
Team	Ground	Capacity	City/Area	Previous season
Anselmians	Malone Field		Eastham, Wirral	2nd
Blackburn	Ramsgreave Drive		Blackburn, Lancashire	8th
Bowdon	Clay Lane		Timperley, Altrincham, Greater Manchester	Promoted from Regional 2NW (1st)
Burton	Battlestead Croft, Tatenhill	5,500 (600 seats	Burton upon Trent, Staffordshire	Level transfer from Regional 1 Midlands (4th)
Derby	Haslams Lane		Derby, Derbyshire	Level transfer from Regional 1 Midlands (9th)
Huddersfield	Lockwood Park	1,500 (500 seats)	Huddersfield, South Yorkshire	Level transfer from Regional 1 North East (2nd)
Leek	Altrad Park		Cheddleton, Staffordshire	10th
Long Eaton	West Park	1,000	Long Eaton, Derbyshire	Level transfer from Regional 1 Midlands (8th)
Manchester	Grove Park	4,000 (250 seats)	Cheadle Hulme, Stockport, Greater Manchester	3rd
Rochdale	Moorgate Avenue		Rochdale, Greater Manchester	Promoted from Regional 2 North East
Stockport	The Memorial Ground	500	Bramhall, Stockport, Greater Manchester	5th
Wirral	The Memorial Ground		Clatterbridge, Wirral	4th

Locations of the 2025–26 Regional 1 North West teams
Locations of the 2025−26 Regional 1 North West teams in Greater Manchester

=== League table ===
Regional 1 North West 2025–26
	Team	Played	Won	Drawn	Lost	Points for	Points against	Points diff	Try bonus	Loss bonus	Points	Pts amended
1	Huddersfield (P)	22	21	0	1	1021	570	432	22	0	106	
2	Anselmians	22	19	1	2	952	410	542	21	1	100	
3	Stockport	22	15	0	7	661	458	203	13	2	75	
4	Burton	22	12	1	9	617	655	−38	18	3	71	
5	Leek	22	11	0	11	641	646	−5	15	6	65	
6	Blackburn	22	12	0	10	598	690	−92	13	1	62	
7	Bowdon	22	10	0	12	550	598	−48	9	5	54	
8	Rochdale	22	8	1	13	583	796	−213	13	5	52	
9	Manchester (R)	22	8	1	13	616	754	138	13	1	48	
10	Wirral	22	8	1	13	575	642	−67	8	4	46	
11	Long Eaton (R)	22	4	0	18	521	815	−294	11	4	31	
12	Derby (R)	22	1	1	20	429	867	−439	7	5	13	−5
If teams are level at any stage, tiebreakers are applied in the following order: 1. Number of matches won 2. Team with most draws 3. Difference between points for and against 4. Total number of points for 5. Aggregate number of points scored in matches between tied teams 6. Number of matches won excluding the first match, then the second and so on until the tie is settled
Mint background is the promotion place. (1st); Green background is the promotion play-off places. (2nd-3rd); Pink background are the relegation play-off places (9th-10th); Salmon background are the relegation places (subject to confirmation by the RFU). (11th-12th); Updated: 19 April 2026 Source:

=== Play-offs ===
The champions, Huddersfield, are automatically promoted to next seasons National League 2 North. Second-placed Anselmians won the Regional 1 North West play-off against third-placed Stockport, while Alnwick (2nd) lost to Harrogate (3rd) in the Regional 1 North East play-off. In the second round Harrogate won at Anselmians for the right to play in the National League 2 North Accession Final against Rossendale. Harrogate won the final and will play in next seasons National League 2 North. In each match the highest placed team play at home.

Promotion play-offs
Round 1

25 April 2026

Anselmians (2nd)	31 – 25	Stockport (3rd)

Malone Field, Eastham, Merseyside

25 April 2026

Alnwick (2nd)	35 – 45	Harrogate (3rd)

Greensfield, Alnwick

Round 2

2 May 2026

Anselmians	40 – 41	Harrogate

Malone Field, Eastham, Merseyside

National League 2 North Accession Final

The 12th-placed team in the National League 2 North played the winner of the Regional 1 North East and Regional 1 North West promotion play-off to decide who would be the final side in next seasons National League 2 North.

9 May 2026

Rossendale	14 – 21	Harrogate

Marl Pits, Rawtenstall

- Harrogate promoted.

9 May 2026

–

Relegation play-off

The 9th and 10th placed teams held a play-off, with the losing team playing in the Regional 1 Accession Final, against Vale of Lune, the winner of the Regional 2 North West promotion play-off. Vale of Lune are promoted to Regional 1 North West and Manchester are relegated to Regional 2 North West.

25 April 2026

Manchester (9th)	19 – 36	Wirral (10th)

Grove Park, Cheadle Hulme

Regional 1 Accession Final

9 May 2026

Manchester	13 – 16	Vale of Lune

Grove Park, Cheadle Hulme

== 2024–25 ==
Departing were Macclesfield, promoted to National League 2 West, whilst Sandbach and Northwich were relegated to Regional 2 North West.

=== Participating teams and locations ===
Team	Ground	Capacity	City/Area	Previous season
Anselmians	Malone Field		Eastham, Wirral	9th
Birkenhead Park	Upper Park	2,000	Birkenhead, Wirral	Promoted from Regional 2NW (1st)
Blackburn	Ramsgreave Drive		Blackburn, Lancashire	3rd
Kendal	Mint Bridge Stadium	3,500 (258 seats)	Kendal, Cumbria	6th
Leek	Altrad Park		Cheddleton, Staffordshire	10th
Manchester	Grove Park	4,000 (250 seats)	Cheadle Hulme, Stockport, Greater Manchester	5th
Newport (Salop)	The Old Showground		Newport, Shropshire	Relegated from Nat 2 West (13th)
Penrith	Winters Park		Penrith, Cumbria	8th
Rossendale	Marl Pits	1,100 (100 stand)	Rawtenstall, Rossendale, Lancashire	2nd
Stockport	The Memorial Ground	500	Bramhall, Stockport, Greater Manchester	7th
Stoke-on-Trent	Hartwell Lane	2,000	Barlaston, Staffordshire	Level transfer from Regional 1 Midlands (5th)
Wirral	The Memorial Ground		Clatterbridge, Wirral	4th

Locations of the 2024–25 Regional 1 North West teams

=== League table ===
Regional 1 North West 2024–25
	Team	Played	Won	Drawn	Lost	Points for	Points against	Points diff	Try bonus	Loss bonus	Points
C	Rossendale	22	18	1	3	994	570	424	19	1	94
2	Anselmians	22	18	0	4	702	458	244	14	2	88
3	Manchester	22	17	0	5	835	502	333	18	1	87
4	Wirral	22	16	0	6	627	529	98	15	2	81
5	Stockport	22	14	0	8	778	562	216	16	3	75
6	Newport (Salop)	22	11	0	11	661	633	28	13	5	62
7	Penrith	22	8	3	11	723	679	49	15	5	58
8	Blackburn	22	7	1	14	594	805	−211	10	3	43
9	Kendal	22	6	1	15	564	649	−85	12	5	43
10	Leek	22	7	0	15	588	836	−248	10	4	42
R	Stoke-on-Trent	22	4	0	18	602	915	−313	15	3	34
R	Birkenhead Park	22	3	0	19	447	977	−530	7	2	21
If teams are level at any stage, tiebreakers are applied in the following order: 1. Number of matches won 2. Team with most draws 3. Difference between points for and against 4. Total number of points for 5. Aggregate number of points scored in matches between tied teams 6. Number of matches won excluding the first match, then the second and so on until the tie is settled
Green background is the promotion place. Pink background are relegation places (subject to confirmation by the RFU). Updated: 15 April 2025 Source:

== 2023–24 ==
Departing were Lymm, promoted to National League 2 North whilst Kirkby Lonsdale and Burnage were relegated to Regional 2 North West.

=== Participating teams and locations ===
Team	Ground	Capacity	City/Area	Previous season
Anselmians	Malone Field		Eastham, Merseyside	Promoted from Regional 2 North West (1st)
Blackburn	Ramsgreave Drive		Blackburn, Lancashire	2nd
Kendal	Mint Bridge Stadium	3,500 (258 seats)	Kendal, Cumbria	10th
Leek	Esterchem Park		Cheddleton, Staffordshire	Promoted from Regional 2 North Midlands (1st)
Macclesfield	Priory Park	1,250 (250 seats)	Macclesfield, Cheshire	5th
Manchester	Grove Park	4,000 (250 seats)	Cheadle Hulme, Stockport, Greater Manchester	8th
Northwich	Moss Farm		Northwich, Cheshire	9th
Penrith	Winters Park		Penrith, Cumbria	Promoted from Regional 2 North (1st)
Rossendale	Marl Pits	1,100 (100 stand)	Rawtenstall, Rossendale, Lancashire	3rd
Sandbach	Bradwall Road		Sandbach, Cheshire	4th
Stockport	The Memorial Ground	500	Bramhall, Stockport, Greater Manchester	6th
Wirral	The Memorial Ground		Clatterbridge, Wirral	7th

Locations of the 2023–24 Regional 1 North West teams

=== League table ===
Regional 1 North West 2023–24
	Team	Played	Won	Drawn	Lost	Points for	Points against	Points diff	Try bonus	Loss bonus	Points
C	Macclesfield	22	20	1	1	908	378	+530	22	0	104
2	Rossendale	22	19	1	2	1081	402	+679	21	2	101
3	Blackburn	22	16	1	5	877	435	+442	19	2	87
4	Wirral	22	14	0	8	550	514	+36	14	3	73
5	Manchester	22	13	1	8	528	519	+9	11	2	67
6	Kendal	22	9	1	12	488	627	−139	8	3	49
7	Stockport	22	8	0	14	448	611	−163	9	4	45
8	Penrith	22	7	0	15	504	751	−247	10	4	42
9	Anselmians	22	7	2	13	382	653	−271	6	3	41
10	Leek	22	5	1	16	483	658	−175	4	7	33
R	Sandbach	22	5	0	17	395	680	−285	5	5	30
R	Northwich	22	5	0	17	390	806	−416	5	1	26
If teams are level at any stage, tiebreakers are applied in the following order: 1. Number of matches won 2. Team with most draws 3. Difference between points for and against 4. Total number of points for 5. Aggregate number of points scored in matches between tied teams 6. Number of matches won excluding the first match, then the second and so on until the tie is settled
Green background is the promotion place. Pink background are relegation places. Updated: 12 May 2024; Source:

=== Results ===
Home \ Away	ANS	BLA	KEN	LEE	MAC	MAN	NOR	PEN	ROS	SAN	STO	WIR
Anselmians	—	29–29	19–12	13–14	5–33	22–22	18–7	26–22	25–57	13–11	22–12	14–27
Blackburn	45–3	—	24–19	57–0	14–29	24–25	62–15	64–17	25–24	42–14	40–5	47–5
Kendal	5–28	38–80	—	20–17	14–25	14–25	47–20	13–0	17–34	26–18	33–24	31–30
Leek	47–20	20–50	25–25	—	11–24	17–28	64–20	41–43	19–34	18–13	11–18	17–22
Macclesfield	75–5	34–26	38–22	41–5	—	31–21	38–17	57–15	36–60	66–24	46–6	22–10
Manchester	18–12	17–24	38–34	20–15	13–29	—	29–18	40–32	26–46	29–14	28–17	33–28
Northwich	29–28	26–87	15–22	34–30	13–66	17–7	—	69–19	7–68	21–5	17–32	13–31
Penrith	38–15	15–21	27–7	21–27	24–33	17–34	35–5	—	35–66	19–14	29–12	23–24
Rossendale	71–7	40–21	45–14	54–12	26–26	27–5	43–3	106–14	—	45–7	40–10	61–33
Sandbach	35–19	8–47	17–30	44–38	12–41	24–12	33–7	21–24	12–75	—	18–17	24–37
Stockport	26–29	24–26	31–34	24–14	7–50	26–34	27–10	32–23	34–33	27–20	—	27–26
Wirral	18–10	28–22	27–15	33–21	32–48	31–24	15–7	24–12	14–26	27–7	28–10	—

Updated to match(es) played on 6 April 2024. Source: Regional 1 North West
Legend: Blue = home team win; Yellow = draw; Red = away team win.
For upcoming matches, an "a" indicates there is an article about the rivalry between the two participants.

== 2022–23 ==
This was the first season following the RFU Adult Competition Review.

Eight of the twelve teams were drawn from the 2021–22 North Premier league sides with four promoted or transferred in. Of the remaining six North Premier clubs, four went to Regional 1 North East and the top two were promoted to National League 2 North.

=== Participating teams and locations ===
Team	Ground	Capacity	City/Area	Previous season
Blackburn	Ramsgreave Drive		Blackburn, Lancashire	North Premier (3rd)
Burnage	Varley Park		Stockport, Greater Manchester	North Premier (12th)
Kendal	Mint Bridge Stadium	3,500 (258 seats)	Kendal, Cumbria	Promoted from North 1 West (3rd)
Kirkby Lonsdale	Underley Park		Kirkby Lonsdale, Cumbria	North Premier (13th)
Lymm	Crouchley Lane	1,000	Lymm, Cheshire	North Premier (5th)
Macclesfield	Priory Park	1,250 (250 seats)	Macclesfield, Cheshire	North Premier (6th)
Manchester	Grove Park	4,000 (250 seats)	Cheadle Hulme, Stockport, Greater Manchester	Promoted from North 1 West (2nd)
Northwich	Moss Farm		Northwich, Cheshire	North Premier (14th)
Rossendale	Marl Pits	1,100 (100 stand)	Rawtenstall, Rossendale, Lancashire	North Premier (8th)
Sandbach	Bradwall Road		Sandbach, Cheshire	Transferred from Midlands Premier (5th)
Stockport	The Memorial Ground	500	Bramhall, Stockport, Greater Manchester	Promoted from North 1 West (champions)
Wirral	The Memorial Ground		Clatterbridge, Wirral	North Premier (9th)

Locations of the 2022–23 Regional 1 North West teams

=== Final league table ===
Regional 1 North West 2022–23
	Team	Played	Won	Drawn	Lost	Points for	Points against	Points diff	Try bonus	Loss bonus	Points
P	Lymm	22	19	0	3	1089	373	716	19	1	96
2	Blackburn	22	19	0	3	1085	369	716	19	1	96
3	Rossendale	22	16	0	6	868	482	386	17	1	82
4	Sandbach	22	15	0	7	703	431	272	10	1	71
5	Macclesfield	22	13	0	9	760	579	181	15	4	71
6	Stockport	22	12	1	9	649	530	119	12	4	66
7	Wirral	22	11	0	11	603	561	42	13	3	60
8	Manchester	22	9	0	13	650	665	−15	14	6	56
9	Northwich	22	9	1	12	565	675	−110	10	2	50
10	Kendal	22	6	0	16	560	774	−214	9	4	37
R	Burnage	22	2	0	20	381	975	−594	4	2	14
R	Kirkby Lonsdale	22	0	0	22	189	1616	−1427	0	0	0
If teams are level at any stage, tiebreakers are applied in the following order: 1. Number of matches won 2. Difference between points for and against 3. Total number of points for 4. Aggregate number of points scored in matches between tied teams 5. Number of matches won excluding the first match, then the second and so on until the tie is settled
Green background is the promotion place. Pink background are relegation places. Updated: 17 April 2023; Source:

=== Results ===
Home \ Away	BLA	BUR	KEN	KIR	LYM	MAC	MAN	NOR	ROS	SAN	STO	WIR
Blackburn	—	68–12	34–24	190–0	27–7	31–14	52–17	33–21	26–13	14–22	33–17	50–26
Burnage	7–45	—	7–39	38–7	14–87	24–43	10–33	13–23	27–31	10–44	26–45	5–38
Kendal	10–57	69–14	—	41–0	19–50	12–41	18–17	38–10	17–35	32–34	26–27	3–28
Kirkby Lonsdale	7–90	7–40	23–46	—	7–95	0–77	10–47	22–54	5–95	5–86	17–42	7–47
Lymm	38–21	90–12	79–21	118–3	—	32–36	43–10	81–5	35–22	29–14	30–14	52–26
Macclesfield	25–19	59–10	53–26	58–17	15–38	—	37–17	26–50	29–35	22–24	23–25	45–24
Manchester	28–50	37–28	50–19	65–5	7–36	31–17	—	28–31	28–34	13–18	31–25	59–21
Northwich	17–36	29–14	29–24	51–8	10–47	38–35	37–40	—	19–23	17–13	17–17	32–42
Rossendale	13–26	40–12	61–28	87–0	36–14	69–22	75–24	36–27	—	38–26	33–19	29–12
Sandbach	23–36	46–29	62–12	106–14	18–31	7–25	31–14	27–17	25–21	—	10–0	32–7
Stockport	15–35	66–7	26–19	79–17	24–26	29–35	36–29	28–14	48–37	15–22	—	24–22
Wirral	7–34	29–22	37–17	64–8	12–32	21–23	32–35	44–17	13–5	30–13	21–28	—

Updated to match(es) played on 25 March 2023. Source: Regional 1 North East
Legend: Blue = home team win; Yellow = draw; Red = away team win.
For upcoming matches, an "a" indicates there is an article about the rivalry between the two participants.

== Regional 1 North West honours ==
List of Regional 1 North West honours
Season	No of teams	Champions	Runner–up	Relegated teams	Ref
2022–23	12	Lymm	Blackburn	Burnage and Kirkby Lonsdale	
2023–24	12	Macclesfield	Rossendale	Sandbach and Northwich	
2024–25	12	Rossendale	Anselmians RUFC	Stoke-on-Trent and Birkenhead Park	
Green background is the promotion place.
