= Counties 1 Midlands West (North) =

Level 7 English Rugby Union league

- Current season or competition: 2025–26 Counties 1 Midlands West (North)
- Sport: Rugby union
- Instituted: 1992; 34 years ago (as Midlands West 1)
- Number of teams: 12
- Country: England
- Holders: Sutton Coldfield (2024–25)
- Most titles: Camp Hill, Lichfield, Luctonians, Ludlow, Moseley Oak (2 titles)
- Website: England RFU

Counties 1 Midlands West (North) (formerly Midands 2 West (North)) is a level 7 English rugby union league and level 3 of the Midlands League, made up of clubs from the northern part of the West Midlands region including Shropshire, Staffordshire, parts of Birmingham and the West Midlands and occasionally Cheshire, with home and away matches played throughout the season. When this division began in 1992 it was known as Midlands West 1, until it was split into two regional divisions called Midlands 3 West (North) and Midlands 3 West (South) ahead of the 2000–01 season. Further restructuring of the Midlands leagues ahead of the 2009–10 season, saw it changed to Midlands 2 West (North) and post the Rugby Football Union (RFU)'s Adult Competition Review, from season 2022–23 it adopted its current name.

Sutton Coldfield are the current champions.

== Format ==
The champions are promoted to Regional Midlands 2 West or occasionally to Regional 2 Midlands North. The number of teams relegated depends on feedback following promotion and relegation in the leagues above, but is usually to Counties 2 Midlands West (South).

The season runs from September to April and comprises twenty-two rounds of matches, with each club playing each of its rivals, home and away. The results of the matches contribute points to the league as follows:

- 4 points are awarded for a win
- 2 points are awarded for a draw
- 0 points are awarded for a loss, however
- 1 losing (bonus) point is awarded to a team that loses a match by 7 points or fewer
- 1 additional (bonus) point is awarded to a team scoring 4 tries or more in a match.

== 2026–27 ==
Departing were the champions Whitchurch promoted to Regional 2 Midlands North, while Telford Hornets (11th) and Tamworth (12th) were relegated to Counties 2 Midlands West (West).

| Team | Ground | Capacity | City/Area | Previous season |
|---|---|---|---|---|
| Aston Old Edwardians | Sunnybank Avenue | | Kingstanding, Birmingham, West Midlands | 9th |
| Burntwood | The Sportsway | | Burntwood, Staffordshire | 7th |
| Crewe & Nantwich | Newcastle Road | | Nantwich, Cheshire | 2nd |
| Newcastle (Staffs) | Lilleshall Road | | Clayton, Newcastle-under-Lyme, Staffordshire | 8th |
| Newport (Salop) 2XV | The Old Showground | | Newport, Shropshire | 6th |
| Old Halesonians | Wassell Grove | | Hagley, Stourbridge, Worcestershire | Relegated from Regional 2 Midlands West (12th) |
| Shrewsbury | Sundorne Castle | | Uffington, Shrewsbury, Shropshire | 3rd |
| Spartans | Coppice Lane | | Middleton, Sutton Coldfield, West Midlands | 4th |
| Stourbridge Lions | Stourton Park | | Stourbridge, West Midlands | 10th |
| Trentham | New Inn Lane | | Trentham, Stoke-on-Trent, Staffordshire | Promoted from Counties 2 Midlands West (West) (champions) |
| Veseyans | Memorial Ground | | Walsall, West Midlands | 5th |
| Willenhall | Bognop Road | | Essington, Staffordshire | Promoted from Counties 2 Midlands West (West) (runners-up) |

Locations of the 2026–27 Counties 1 Midlands West (North) teams
Locations of the 2026-27 Counties 1 Midlands West (North) teams in Greater Birmingham area & the West Midlands

== 2025–26 ==
Departing were the champions Sutton Coldfield promoted to Regional 2 Midlands North, while Willenhall (10th), Stafford (11th) and Wolverhampton (12th) were relegated to Counties 2 Midlands West (West). Also leaving were Kidderminster Carolians (8th) on a level transfer to Counties 1 Midlands West (South). Joining the league were Aston Old Edwardians promoted from Counties 2 Midlands West (East) and Stourbridge Lions promoted from Counties 2 Midlands West (West) as champions. Crewe & Nantwich (11th) were relegated from Regional 2 North West, Tamworth (11th) relegated from Regional 2 North Midlands and Whitchurch (12th) relegated from Regional 2 West Midlands.

| Team | Ground | Capacity | City/Area | Previous season |
|---|---|---|---|---|
| Aston Old Edwardians | Sunnybank Avenue | | Kingstanding, Birmingham, West Midlands | Promoted from Counties 2 Midlands West (East) (1st) |
| Burntwood | The Sportsway | | Burntwood, Staffordshire | 2nd |
| Crewe & Nantwich | Newcastle Road | | Nantwich, Cheshire | Relegated from Regional 2 North West {11th) |
| Newcastle (Staffs) | Lilleshall Road | | Clayton, Newcastle-under-Lyme, Staffordshire | 3rd |
| Newport (Salop) 2XV | The Old Showground | | Newport, Shropshire | 7th |
| Shrewsbury | Sundorne Castle | | Uffington, Shrewsbury, Shropshire | 9th |
| Spartans | Coppice Lane | | Middleton, Sutton Coldfield, West Midlands | 5th |
| Stourbridge Lions | Stourton Park | | Stourbridge, West Midlands | Promoted from Counties 2 Midlands West (West) (1st) |
| Tamworth | Wigginton Park | | Tamworth, Staffordshire | Relegated from Regional 2 Midlands North (12th) |
| Telford Hornets | Hinkshay Road | | Telford, Shropshire | 6th |
| Veseyans | Memorial Ground | | Walsall, West Midlands | 4th |
| Whitchurch | Edgeley Park | | Whitchurch, Shropshire | Relegated from Regional 2 Midlands West (12th) |

Locations of the 2025–26 Counties 1 Midlands West (North) teams
Locations of the 2025–26 Counties 1 Midlands West (North) teams in Greater Birmingham area & the West Midlands

== 2024–25 ==
=== Participating teams & locations ===
Departing were Edwardians promoted to Regional 2 Midlands North whilst Old Saltleians were promoted to Regional 2 Midlands West. Harborne and Longton were relegated to Counties 2 Midlands West (West). Camp Hill left on a level transfer to Counties 1 Midlands West (South). Joining were Sutton Coldfield and Wolverhampton, both relegated, together with Veseyans, Newport (Salop) 2XV and Willenhall – all promoted.

| Team | Ground | Capacity | City/Area | Previous season |
|---|---|---|---|---|
| Burntwood | The Sportsway | | Burntwood, Staffordshire | 4th |
| Kidderminster Carolians | Marlpool Lane | | Kidderminster, Worcestershire | 6th |
| Newport (Salop) 2XV | The Old Showground | | Newport, Shropshire | Promoted from Counties 2 Midlands West (West) (champions) |
| Newcastle (Staffs) | Lilleshall Road | | Clayton, Newcastle-under-Lyme, Staffordshire | 3rd |
| Shrewsbury | Sundorne Castle | | Uffington, Shrewsbury, Shropshire | 5th |
| Spartans | Coppice Lane | | Middleton, Sutton Coldfield, West Midlands | 8th |
| Stafford | The County Ground | | Stafford, Staffordshire | 9th |
| Sutton Coldfield | Roger Smoldon Ground | | Sutton Coldfield, West Midlands | Relegated from Regional 2 Midlands North (12th) |
| Telford Hornets | Hinkshay Road | | Telford, Shropshire | 7th |
| Veseyans | Memorial Ground | | Walsall, West Midlands | Promoted from Counties 2 Midlands West (East) (2nd) |
| Willenhall | Bognop Road | | Essington, Staffordshire | Promoted from Counties 2 Midlands West (West) (2nd) |
| Wolverhampton | Castlecroft Road | | Castlecroft, Wolverhampton, West Midlands | Relegated from Regional 2 Midlands North (11th) |

Locations of the 2024–25 Counties 1 Midlands West (North) teams
Locations of the 2024–25 Counties 1 Midlands West (North) teams in Greater Birmingham area & the West Midlands

=== League table ===
2024–25 Counties 1 Midlands West (North)
| | | Played | Won | Drawn | Lost | Points for | Points against | Points diff | Try bonus | Loss bonus | Points | Pts adj |
| 1 | Sutton Coldfield (P) | 22 | 22 | 0 | 0 | 1160 | 302 | 858 | 22 | 0 | 110 | |
| 2 | Burntwood | 22 | 19 | 0 | 3 | 797 | 490 | 307 | 15 | 0 | 91 | |
| 3 | Newcastle (Staffs) | 22 | 14 | 1 | 7 | 696 | 529 | 167 | 15 | 2 | 75 | |
| 4 | Veseyans | 22 | 13 | 0 | 9 | 655 | 584 | 71 | 17 | 5 | 74 | |
| 5 | Spartans | 22 | 13 | 0 | 9 | 578 | 575 | 3 | 13 | 5 | 70 | |
| 6 | Telford Hornets | 22 | 10 | 0 | 12 | 543 | 665 | −122 | 12 | 4 | 56 | |
| 7 | Newport (Salop) 2XV | 22 | 9 | 0 | 13 | 571 | 611 | −40 | 13 | 6 | 55 | |
| 8 | Kidderminster Carolians | 22 | 10 | 0 | 12 | 539 | 725 | −186 | 10 | 0 | 50 | |
| 9 | Shrewsbury | 22 | 7 | 0 | 15 | 633 | 830 | −197 | 13 | 6 | 47 | |
| 10 | Willenhall (R) | 22 | 6 | 0 | 16 | 510 | 694 | −184 | 14 | 7 | 45 | |
| 11 | Stafford (R) | 22 | 6 | 0 | 16 | 437 | 781 | −344 | 7 | 1 | 33 | +1 |
| 12 | Wolverhampton (R) | 22 | 2 | 1 | 19 | 365 | 698 | −333 | 6 | 5 | 21 | |
If teams are level at any stage, tiebreakers are applied in the following order: 1. Number of matches won 2. Difference between points for and against 3. Total number of points for 4. Aggregate number of points scored in matches between tied teams 5. Number of matches won excluding the first match, then the second and so on until the tie is settled
Green background is the promotion place Pink background are the relegation places Updated: 27 December 2025

== 2023–24 ==
=== Participating teams & locations ===
Departing were 2nd-placed Tamworth promoted to Regional 2 Midlands North. Luctonians 2XV (1st) moved on a level transfer to Counties 1 Midlands West (South) – promotion to level 6 was not permitted due to league rules on reserve teams in the RFU leagues. Stourbridge Lions and Uttoxeter were relegated to Counties 2 Midlands West (West) and Counties 2 Midlands West (East) respectively. Joining were Harborne and Burntwood, both promoted, together with Kidderminster Carolians and Spartans both on a level transfer

| Team | Ground | Capacity | City/Area | Previous season |
|---|---|---|---|---|
| Burntwood | The Sportsway | | Burntwood, Staffordshire | Promoted from Counties 2 Midlands West (North) (champions) |
| Camp Hill | The Shrine | | Shirley, Solihull, West Midlands | 5th |
| Edwardians | Memorial Ground | | Solihull, West Midlands | 3rd |
| Harborne | Metchley Park | | Birmingham, West Midlands | Promoted from Counties 2 Midlands West (North) (2nd) |
| Kidderminster Carolians | Marlpool Lane | | Kidderminster, Worcestershire | Level transfer from Counties 1 Midlands West (South) (2nd) |
| Longton | Trentham Fields | | Longton, Stoke-on-Trent, Staffordshire | 10th |
| Newcastle (Staffs) | Lilleshall Road | | Clayton, Newcastle-under-Lyme, Staffordshire | 7th |
| Old Saltleians | Watton Lane | | Water Orton, Warwickshire | 8th |
| Shrewsbury | Sundorne Castle | | Uffington, Shrewsbury, Shropshire | 6th |
| Spartans | Coppice Lane | | Middleton, Sutton Coldfield, West Midlands | Level transfer from Counties 1 Midlands West (South) (9th) |
| Stafford | The County Ground | | Stafford, Staffordshire | 4th |
| Telford Hornets | Hinkshay Road | | Telford, Shropshire | 9th |

Locations of the 2023–24 Counties 1 Midlands West (North) teams

=== League table ===
2023–24 Counties 1 Midlands West (North)
| | | Played | Won | Drawn | Lost | Points for | Points against | Points diff | Try bonus | Loss bonus | Points | Pts adj |
| 1 | Edwardians (P) | 22 | 21 | 0 | 1 | 931 | 260 | 671 | 20 | 1 | 105 | |
| 2 | Old Saltleians | 22 | 20 | 0 | 2 | 936 | 312 | 624 | 18 | 1 | 99 | |
| 3 | Newcastle (Staffs) | 22 | 16 | 0 | 6 | 703 | 464 | 239 | 13 | 2 | 79 | |
| 4 | Burntwood | 22 | 12 | 0 | 10 | 684 | 556 | 128 | 14 | 4 | 67 | +1 |
| 5 | Shrewsbury | 22 | 12 | 0 | 10 | 663 | 658 | 5 | 13 | 1 | 63 | |
| 6 | Kidderminster Carolians | 22 | 11 | 0 | 11 | 618 | 534 | 84 | 12 | 3 | 59 | |
| 7 | Telford Hornets | 22 | 10 | 0 | 12 | 534 | 545 | −11 | 8 | 4 | 52 | |
| 8 | Spartans | 22 | 9 | 0 | 13 | 554 | 570 | −16 | 11 | 4 | 51 | |
| 9 | Stafford | 22 | 9 | 0 | 13 | 463 | 753 | −290 | 10 | 1 | 47 | |
| 10 | Camp Hill | 22 | 7 | 0 | 15 | 505 | 615 | −110 | 7 | 6 | 41 | |
| 11 | Longton (R) | 22 | 4 | 0 | 18 | 429 | 1103 | −674 | 7 | 2 | 25 | |
| 12 | Harborne (R) | 22 | 1 | 0 | 21 | 281 | 931 | −650 | 2 | 2 | −2 | −10 |
If teams are level at any stage, tiebreakers are applied in the following order: 1. Number of matches won 2. Difference between points for and against 3. Total number of points for 4. Aggregate number of points scored in matches between tied teams 5. Number of matches won excluding the first match, then the second and so on until the tie is settled
Green background is the promotion place Pink background are the relegation places Updated: 25 December 2025

== 2022–23 ==
=== Participating teams & locations ===
This was the first season following the RFU Adult Competition Review with the league adopting its new name of Counties 1 Midlands West (South). Departing were Crewe & Nantwich, Moseley Oak and Walsall all promoted to Regional 2 Midlands West. Also leaving was Leek, promoted to Regional 2 Midlands North. Joining were Edwardians, Shrewsbury, Telford Hornets and Luctonians 2XV.

| Team | Ground | Capacity | City/Area | Previous season |
|---|---|---|---|---|
| Camp Hill | The Shrine | | Shirley, Solihull, West Midlands | 6th |
| Edwardians | Memorial Ground | | Solihull, West Midlands | Promoted from Midlands 3 West (North) (champions) |
| Longton | Trentham Fields | | Longton, Stoke-on-Trent, Staffordshire | 5th |
| Luctonians 2XV | Mortimer Park | 2,500 (300 seats) | Kingsland, Herefordshire | New entry |
| Newcastle (Staffs) | Lilleshall Road | | Clayton, Newcastle-under-Lyme, Staffordshire | 9th |
| Old Saltleians | Watton Lane | | Water Orton, Warwickshire | 11th |
| Shrewsbury | Sundorne Castle | | Uffington, Shrewsbury, Shropshire | Promoted from Midlands 3 West (North) (3rd) |
| Stafford | The County Ground | | Stafford, Staffordshire | 8th |
| Stourbridge Lions | Stourton Park | 3,500 (499 seats) | Stourbridge, West Midlands | 12th |
| Tamworth | Wigginton Park | | Tamworth, Staffordshire | 7th |
| Telford Hornets | Hinkshay Road | | Telford, Shropshire | Promoted from Midlands 3 West (North) (2nd) |
| Uttoxeter | Oldfields Sports & Social Club | 2,000 | Uttoxeter, Staffordshire | 10th |

Locations of the 2022–23 Counties 1 Midlands West (North) teams

=== League table ===
2022–23 Counties 1 Midlands West (North)
| | | Played | Won | Drawn | Lost | Points for | Points against | Points diff | Try bonus | Loss bonus | Points | Pts adj |
| 1 | Luctonians 2XV | 22 | 22 | 0 | 0 | 827 | 251 | 576 | 18 | 0 | 110 | +4 |
| 2 | Tamworth (P) | 22 | 19 | 0 | 3 | 903 | 346 | 557 | 18 | 0 | 94 | |
| 3 | Edwardians | 22 | 16 | 0 | 6 | 812 | 428 | 384 | 15 | 3 | 84 | +2 |
| 4 | Stafford | 22 | 13 | 0 | 9 | 591 | 504 | 87 | 12 | 2 | 66 | |
| 5 | Camp Hill | 22 | 12 | 0 | 10 | 655 | 580 | 75 | 10 | 2 | 60 | |
| 6 | Shrewsbury | 22 | 10 | 1 | 11 | 595 | 596 | −1 | 9 | 3 | 54 | |
| 7 | Newcastle (Staffs) | 22 | 10 | 1 | 11 | 487 | 656 | −169 | 7 | 1 | 50 | |
| 8 | Old Saltleians | 22 | 9 | 0 | 13 | 543 | 598 | −55 | 11 | 2 | 49 | |
| 9 | Telford Hornets | 22 | 8 | 0 | 14 | 491 | 586 | −95 | 12 | 4 | 48 | |
| 10 | Longton | 22 | 7 | 0 | 15 | 454 | 788 | −334 | 6 | 4 | 39 | −1 |
| 11 | Stourbridge (R) | 22 | 2 | 2 | 18 | 297 | 824 | −527 | 2 | 1 | 15 | +2 |
| 12 | Uttoxeter (R) | 22 | 2 | 0 | 20 | 336 | 834 | −498 | 3 | 3 | 9 | −5 |
If teams are level at any stage, tiebreakers are applied in the following order: 1. Number of matches won 2. Difference between points for and against 3. Total number of points for 4. Aggregate number of points scored in matches between tied teams 5. Number of matches won excluding the first match, then the second and so on until the tie is settled
Green background is the promotion place Pink background are the relegation places Updated: 20 December 2025

== 2021–22 ==
| Team | Ground | Capacity | City/Area | Previous season |
|---|---|---|---|---|
| Camp Hill | The Shrine | | Shirley, Solihull, West Midlands | 2nd |
| Crewe & Nantwich | Newcastle Road | | Nantwich, Cheshire | 9th |
| Leek | Esterchem Park | | Cheddleton, Staffordshire | 4th |
| Longton | Trentham Fields | | Longton, Stoke-on-Trent, Staffordshire | 6th |
| Moseley Oak | Birmingham Moseley Rugby Club | 5,000 (1,300 seated) | Birmingham, West Midlands | 8th |
| Newcastle (Staffs) | Lilleshall Road | | Clayton, Newcastle-under-Lyme, Staffordshire | 10th |
| Old Saltleians | Watton Lane | | Water Orton, Warwickshire | Promoted from Midlands 3 West (North) (runners-up) |
| Stafford | The County Ground | | Stafford, Staffordshire | 3rd |
| Stourbridge Lions | Stourton Park | 3,500 (499 seats) | Stourbridge, West Midlands | Relegated from Midlands 1 West (13th) |
| Tamworth | Wigginton Park | | Tamworth, Staffordshire | 7th |
| Uttoxeter | Oldfields Sports & Social Club | 2,000 | Uttoxeter, Staffordshire | Promoted from Midlands 3 West (North) (champions) |
| Walsall | Broadway Ground | 1,150 (150 stand) | Walsall, West Midlands | 5th |

Locations of the 2021–22 Midlands 2 West (North) teams in Cheshire, Staffordshire, Warwickshire and the West Midlands

== 2020–21 ==
Due to the COVID-19 pandemic, the 2020–21 season was cancelled.

== 2019–20 ==
| Team | Ground | Capacity | City/Area | Previous season |
|---|---|---|---|---|
| Burntwood | The Sportsway | | Burntwood, Staffordshire | Promoted from Midlands 3 WN (runners up) |
| Camp Hill | The Shrine | | Shirley, Solihull, West Midlands | 4th |
| Crewe & Nantwich | Newcastle Road | | Nantwich, Cheshire | 6th |
| Leek | Esterchem Park | | Cheddleton, Staffordshire | 5th |
| Longton | Trentham Fields | | Longton, Stoke-on-Trent, Staffordshire | Relegated from Midlands 1 West (12th) |
| Moseley Oak | Birmingham Moseley Rugby Club | 5,000 (1,300 seated) | Birmingham, West Midlands | Relegated from Midlands 1 West |
| Newcastle (Staffs) | Lilleshall Road | | Clayton, Newcastle-under-Lyme, Staffordshire | 7th |
| Shrewsbury | Sundorne Castle | | Uffington, Shrewsbury, Shropshire | Promoted from Midlands 3 WN (champions) |
| Stafford | The County Ground | | Stafford, Staffordshire | 10th |
| Tamworth | Wigginton Park | | Tamworth, Staffordshire | Runners up (lost playoff) |
| Walsall | Broadway Ground | 1,150 (150 stand) | Walsall, West Midlands | 8th |
| Wolverhampton | Castlecroft Road | | Castlecroft, Wolverhampton, West Midlands | 3rd |

Locations of the 2019–20 Midlands 2 West (North) teams

== 2018–19 ==
| Team | Ground | Capacity | City/Area | Previous season |
|---|---|---|---|---|
| Camp Hill | The Shrine | | Shirley, Solihull, West Midlands | Relegated from Midlands 1 West (13th) |
| Crewe & Nantwich | Newcastle Road | | Nantwich, Cheshire | Runners up (lost playoff) |
| Leek | Esterchem Park | | Cheddleton, Staffordshire | 3rd |
| Ludlow | The Linney | | Ludlow, Shropshire | 5th |
| Newcastle (Staffs) | Lilleshall Road | | Clayton, Newcastle-under-Lyme, Staffordshire | 10th |
| Spartans | Coppice Lane | | Middleton, Sutton Coldfield, West Midlands | 4th |
| Stafford | The County Ground | | Stafford, Staffordshire | Promoted from Midlands 3 West (North) (runners up) |
| Tamworth | Wigginton Park | | Tamworth, Staffordshire | 8th |
| Telford Hornets | Hinkshay Road | | Telford, Shropshire | Promoted from Midlands 3 West (North) (champions) |
| Veseyans | Memorial Ground | | Walsall, West Midlands | 6th |
| Walsall | Broadway Ground | 1,150 (150 stand) | Walsall, West Midlands | 7th |
| Wolverhampton | Castlecroft Road | | Castlecroft, Wolverhampton, West Midlands | Relegated from Midlands 1 West (14th) |

Locations of the 2018–19 Midlands 2 West (North) teams in Staffordshire & the West Midlands
Locations of the 2018–19 Midlands 2 West (North) teams in Shropshire

== 2017–18 ==
| Team | Ground | Capacity | City/Area | Previous season |
|---|---|---|---|---|
| Cleobury Mortimer | Love Lane | | Cleobury Mortimer, Shropshire | Promoted from Midlands 3 West (North) (runners up) |
| Crewe & Nantwich | Newcastle Road | | Nantwich, Cheshire | Relegated from Midlands 1 West (13th) |
| Kidderminster Carolians | Marlpool Lane | | Kidderminster, Worcestershire | 6th |
| Leek | Esterchem Park | | Cheddleton, Staffordshire | 3rd |
| Ludlow | The Linney | | Ludlow, Shropshire | Promoted from Midlands 3 West (North) (champions) |
| Newcastle (Staffs) | Lilleshall Road | | Clayton, Newcastle-under-Lyme, Staffordshire | 9th |
| Old Saltleians | Watton Lane | | Water Orton, Warwickshire | 8th |
| Spartans | Coppice Lane | | Middleton, Sutton Coldfield, West Midlands | Level transfer from Midlands 2 West (South) (3rd) |
| Tamworth | Wigginton Park | | Tamworth, Staffordshire | 5th |
| Veseyans | Memorial Ground | | Walsall, West Midlands | 7th |
| Walsall | Broadway Ground | 1,150 (150 stand) | Walsall, West Midlands | 4th |
| Whitchurch | Edgeley Park | | Whitchurch, Shropshire | Relegated from Midlands 1 West (12th) |

Locations of the 2017–18 Midlands 2 West (North) teams in Staffordshire & the West Midlands
Locations of the 2017–18 Midlands 2 West (North) teams in Shropshire & Worcestershire

== Teams 2016–17 ==
- Camp Hill
- Kidderminster Carolians
- Leek (relegated from Midlands 1 West)
- Newcastle (Staffs) (promoted from Midlands 3 West (North))
- Old Saltleians
- Old Yardleians
- Shrewsbury
- Stafford
- Stourbridge Lions
- Tamworth (promoted from Midlands 3 West (North))
- Veseyans

== Teams 2015-16 ==
- Camp Hill
- Handsworth (promoted from Midlands 3 West (North))
- Harborne (promoted from Midlands 3 West (North))
- Kidderminster Carolians
- Moseley Oak
- Old Saltleians
- Old Yardleians (transferred from Midlands 2 West (South))
- Shrewsbury
- Stafford
- Stourbridge Lions
- Veseyans
- Wolverhampton

== Teams 2014–15 ==
- Bridgnorth
- Camp Hill
- Kidderminster Carolians (transferred from Midlands 2 West (South))
- Ludlow
- Moseley Oak
- Old Saltleians
- Shrewsbury (promoted from Midlands 3 West (North))
- Stafford
- Stourbridge Lions
- Tamworth RFC
- Veseyans (promoted from Midlands 3 West (North))
- Wolverhampton

== Teams 2013–14 ==
- Aston Old Edwardians
- Bridgnorth
- Camp Hill (relegated from Midlands 1 West)
- Crewe & Nantwich
- Leek
- Ludlow
- Moseley Oak
- Old Saltleians
- Stafford
- Tamworth RFC
- Willenhall (promoted from Midlands 3 West (North))
- Wolverhampton

== Teams 2012–13 ==
- Aston Old Edwardians
- Bridgnorth
- Leek
- Lordswood Dixonians
- Moseley Oak
- Old Saltleians
- Silhillians RFC (transferred from Midlands 2 West (South))
- Spartans (Midlands)
- Stafford
- Tamworth RFC
- Veseyans
- Wolverhampton

== Teams 2011–12 ==
- Aston Old Edwardians
- Bridgnorth
- Burntwood (promoted from Midlands 3 West (North))
- Edgbaston Dixonians
- Leek
- Moseley Oak (promoted from Midlands 3 West (North))
- Old Saletians
- Shrewsbury
- Spartans
- Stafford
- Stoke-on-Trent (relegated from Midlands 1 West)
- Stourbridge Lions
- Tamworth

== Teams 2010–11 ==
- Aston Old Edwardians
- Bridgnorth
- Leek
- Lordswood Dixonians
- Ludlow
- Old Saltleians
- Shrewsbury
- Stafford
- Stoke-on-Trent
- Stourbridge Lions
- Tamworth
- Willenhall

== Original teams ==
Teams in Midlands 2 West (North) and Midlands 2 West (South) were originally part of a single division called Midlands 1 West, which contained the following sides when in was introduced in 1992:

- Bromsgrove – relegated from Midlands 2 West (11th)
- Dudley Kingswinford – promoted from North Midlands 1 (runners up)
- Kings Norton – promoted from North Midlands 1 (4th)
- Leek – promoted from Staffordshire/Warwickshire 1 (4th)
- Ludlow – promoted from North Midlands 1 (5th)
- Newbold-on-Avon – relegated from Midlands 2 West (9th)
- Newcastle (Staffs) – promoted from Staffordshire/Warwickshire 1 (runners up)
- Old Halesonians (Note: Old Boys side of Halesowen Grammar School.) – promoted from North Midlands 1 (3rd)
- Old Leamingtonians (Note: Old Boys side of Leamington College.) – promoted from Staffordshire/Warwickshire 1 (5th)
- Old Longtonians (Note: Formed as the Old Boys side of Longton High School, Old Longtonians was renamed as Longton Rugby Club in 1994.) –promoted from Staffordshire/Warwickshire 1 (champions)
- Old Yardleians (Note: Old Boys side of Yardley Grammar School.) - promoted from North Midlands 1 (champions)
- Sutton Coldfield – relegated from Midlands 2 West (10th)
- Willenhall – promoted from Staffordshire/Warwickshire 1 (3rd)

== Counties 1 Midlands West (North) honours ==
=== Midlands West 1 (1992–1993) ===
Midlands 2 West (North) and Midlands 2 West (South) were originally part of a single tier 7 division called Midlands West 1. Promotion was to Midlands 2 and relegation to Midlands West 2 (Note: Midlands West 2 is currently split into two regional divisions - Midlands 4 West (North) and Midlands 4 West (South).).

Midlands West 1
| Season | No of teams | Champions | Runners–up | Relegated teams | Reference |
| 1992–93 | 13 | Willenhall | Newbold-on-Avon | Old Yardleians | |
Green backgrounds are the promotion places.

=== Midlands West 1 (1993–1996) ===
The top six teams from Midlands 1 and the top six from North 1 were combined to create National 5 North, meaning that Midlands 1 West dropped to become a tier 8 league. Promotion and relegation continued to Midlands 2 and Midlands West 2.

Midlands West 1
| Season | No of teams | Champions | Runners–up | Relegated teams | Reference |
| 1993–94 | 13 | Sutton Coldfield | Bromsgrove | Nuneaton Old Edwardians | |
| 1994–95 | 13 | Newport (Salop) | Longton | Ludlow, Newcastle (Staffs) | |
| 1995–96 | 13 | Luctonians | Dudley Kingswinford (Note: Due to the cancellation of National 5 North at the end of the season, five clubs were promoted including Kenilworth, Bromsgrove and Old Laurentians.) | No relegation (Note: Due to widespread restructuring caused by the cancellation of National 5 North there was no relegation.) | |
Green backgrounds are the promotion places.

=== Midlands West 1 (1996–2000) ===
At the end of the 1995–96 season National 5 North was discontinued and Midlands West 1 returned to being a tier 7 league. Promotion and relegation continued to Midlands 2 and Midlands West 2.

Midlands West 1
| Season | No of teams | Champions | Runners–up | Relegated teams | Reference |
| 1996–97 | 17 | Longton | Malvern | Dixonians, Stoke Old Boys, Tamworth | |
| 1997–98 | 17 | Newbold-on-Avon | Keresley | Nuneaton Old Edwardians | |
| 1998–99 | 17 | Malvern | Selly Oak | Ludlow, Willenhall, Leek | |
| 1999–00 | 17 | Selly Oak | Shrewsbury | No relegation (Note: Due to the restructuring of the Midlands leagues for the following season, there was no relegation.) | |
Green backgrounds are the promotion places.

=== Midlands 3 West (North) (2000–2009) ===
Restructuring ahead of the 2000–01 season saw Midlands West 1 split into two tier 7 regional leagues – Midlands 3 West (North) and Midlands 3 West (South). Promotion was to Midlands 2 West (formerly Midlands 2) and relegation to Midlands 4 West (North) (formerly Midlands West 2) (Note: Ahead of the 2000–01 Midlands West 2 was also split into two regional leagues – Midlands 4 West (North) and Midlands 4 West (South).).

Midlands 3 West (North)
| Season | No of teams | Champions | Runners–up | Relegated teams | Reference |
| 2000–01 | 10 | Shrewsbury | Stafford | Newcastle (Staffs) | |
| 2001–02 | 10 | Lordswood Dixonians | Aston Old Edwardians | Leek, Old Halesonians, Selly Oak | |
| 2002–03 | 10 | Aston Old Edwardians | Stoke-on-Trent | Newport (Salop) | |
| 2003–04 | 12 | Burton | Sutton Coldfield | Lordswood Dixonians, Burntwood | |
| 2004–05 | 12 | Camp Hill | Newport (Salop) | Willenhall, Old Saltleians | |
| 2005–06 | 12 | Lichfield | Bridgnorth | Telford Hornets, Newcastle (Staffs) | |
| 2006–07 | 12 | Sandbach | Sutton Coldfield | Burntwood, Old Yardleians | |
| 2007–08 | 12 | Camp Hill | Stoke-on-Trent | Shrewsbury, Leek | |
| 2008–09 | 12 | Old Halesonians | Bournville (Note: Due to the RFU restructuring the league system for the 2009-10 season, runners up Bournville were automatically promoted as one of the two best runners up of the four Midlands 3 divisions, meaning they did not have to face a playoff.) | Wednesbury, Stourbridge Lions | |
Green backgrounds are promotion places.

=== Midlands 2 West (North) (2009–22) ===
League restructuring by the RFU meant that Midlands 3 West (North) and Midlands 3 West (South) were renamed Midlands 2 West (North) and Midlands 2 West (South), with both leagues remaining at tier 7. Promotion was to Midlands 1 West (formerly Midlands 2 West) and relegation to Midlands 3 West (North) (formerly Midlands 4 West (North)).

Midlands 2 West (North)
| Season | No of teams | Champions | Runners–up | Relegated teams | Reference |
| 2009–10 | 12 | Lichfield | Old Saltleians | Wolverhampton, Ashbourne | |
| 2010–11 | 12 | Ludlow | Old Saltleians | Willenhall, Stourbridge Lions | |
| 2011–12 | 12 | Stoke-on-Trent | Old Saltleians | Shrewsbury, Burntwood, Lordswood Dixonians | |
| 2012–13 | 11 | Silhillians | Selly Oak | Veseyans | |
| 2013–14 | 12 | Leek | Crewe & Nantwich | Aston Old Edwardians, Willenhall | |
| 2014–15 | 12 | Bridgnorth | Old Saltleians | Tamworth, Ludlow | |
| 2015–16 | 12 | Moseley Oak | Wolverhampton | Harborne, Handsworth | |
| 2016–17 | 11 | Stourbridge Lions | Camp Hill | Shrewsbury, Stafford | |
| 2017–18 | 12 | Whitchurch | Crewe & Nantwich | Cleobury Mortimer, Old Saltleians | |
| 2018–19 | 12 | Ludlow | Tamworth | Telford Hornets, Veseyans | |
| 2019–20 | 12 | Wolverhampton | Camp Hill | Shrewsbury, Burntwood | |
| 2020–21 | 12 | Cancelled due to the COVID-19 pandemic in the United Kingdom. | | | |
| 2021–22 | 12 | Crewe & Nantwich | Moseley Oak | Walsall and Leek (also promoted); No relegation | |
Green backgrounds are promotion places.

=== Counties 1 Midlands West (North) (2022– ) ===
Following league reorganisation, Midlands 2 West (North) is renamed Counties 1 Midlands West (North) and continues to be a tier 7 league. Promotion is to Regional 2 North Midlands. Relegation is usually to one of the Counties 2 Midlands West leagues.

Counties 1 Midlands West (North)
| Season | No of teams | No of matches | Champions | Runners-up | Relegated team(s) | Ref |
| 2022–23 | 12 | 22 | Luctonians 2XV | Tamworth | Barkers Butts (11th) and Uttoxeter (12th) | |
| 2023–24 | 12 | 22 | Edwardians | Old Saltleians | Longton (11th) and Harborne (12th) | |
| 2024–25 | 12 | 22 | Sutton Coldfield | Burntwood | Willenhall (10th), Stafford (11th) and Wolverhampton (12th) | |
Green background is the promotion place.

== Promotion play-offs ==
Between the 2000–01 season and 2018–19 there were play-offs between the runners-up of Midlands 2 West (North) and Midlands 2 West (South) for the third and final promotion place to Midlands 1 West (asides from 2008–09 which was played between the runners-up of Midlands 2 West (South) and Midlands 2 East (North) due to RFU restructuring). The team with the superior league record had home advantage in the tie. At the end of the 2018–19 season the Midlands 2 West (South) teams had ten wins to Midlands 2 West (North) teams eight; and the home team has won promotion on eleven occasions compared to the away teams seven.

Midlands 2 West (North) v Midlands 2 West (South) promotion play-off results
| Season | Home team | Score | Away team | Venue | Attendance | Ref |
| 2000–01 | Stafford (N) | 32–10 | Leamington (S) | The County Ground, Stafford, Staffordshire | | |
| 2001–02 | Bedworth (S) | 10–6 | Aston Old Edwardians (N) | Smarts Road, Bedworth, Warwickshire | | |
| 2002–03 | Old Coventrians (S) | 15–17 | Stoke-on-Trent (N) | Till Hill Lane, Coventry, Warwickshire | | |
| 2003–04 | Sutton Coldfield (N) | 3–37 | Leamington (S) | Roger Smoldon Ground, Sutton Coldfield, West Midlands | | |
| 2004–05 | Newport (Salop) (N) | 25–12 | Pershore (S) | The Old Showground, Newport, Shropshire | | |
| 2005–06 | Bridgnorth (N) | 17–14 | Hereford (S) | Edgar Davis Ground, Bridgnorth, Shropshire | | |
| 2006–07 | Sutton Coldfield (N) | 11–18 | Stratford-upon-Avon (S) | Roger Smoldon Ground, Sutton Coldfield, West Midlands | | |
| 2007–08 | Droitwich (S) | 3–18 | Stoke-on-Trent (N) | The Glyn Mitchell Memorial Ground, Droitwich Spa, Worcestershire | | |
| 2008–09 | Promotion play-offs different for this season only. (Note: The 2008–09 promotion play–offs were different as the RFU was reorganizing the leagues across the country including the Midlands Division. Usually the winners of each of the four regional divisions would be promoted automatically, along with two of the runners-up who won their respective play-offs, meaning six teams are promoted. This year one extra was required to be promoted so the top two runners–up by league points – Bourneville (40) and Stewarts & Lloyds (40) went up – leaving the other two runners–up – Nuneaton Old Edwardians (34) and Spalding (38) – to compete for the final promotion spot.) | | | | | |
| 2009–10 | Old Saltleians (N) | 12–14 | Old Laurentians (S) | Watton Lane, Water Orton, Warwickshire | | |
| 2010–11 | Bedworth (S) | 15–6 | Old Saltleians (N) | Smarts Road, Bedworth, Warwickshire | | |
| 2011–12 | Old Saltleians (N) | 3–27 | Berkswell & Balsall (S) | Watton Lane, Water Orton, Warwickshire | | |
| 2012–13 | Old Laurentians (S) | 16–6 | Selly Oak (S) | Fenley Field, Rugby, Warwickshire | | |
| 2013–14 | Crewe & Nantwich (N) | 18–13 | Banbury (S) | Newcastle Road, Nantwich, Cheshire | 500 | |
| 2014–15 | Old Laurentians (S) | 32–23 | Old Saltleians (N) | Fenley Field, Rugby, Warwickshire | 500 | |
| 2015–16 | Earlsdon (S) | 5–20 | Wolverhampton (N) | Mitchell Avenue, Canley, Coventry, West Midlands | | |
| 2016–17 | Camp Hill (N) | 53–0 | Silhillians | Haslucks Green Road, Shirley, Solihull, West Midlands | | |
| 2017–18 | Malvern (S) | 53–12 | Crewe & Nantwich (N) | Spring Lane, Malvern, Worcestershire | | |
| 2018–19 | Kidderminster Carolians (S) | 33–17 | Tamworth (N) | Marlpool Lane, Kidderminster, Worcestershire | 500 | |
| 2019–20 | Cancelled due to the COVID-19 pandemic in the United Kingdom. Best ranked runner-up – Malvern (S) – promoted instead. | | | | | |
| 2020–21 | No play-off due to league reorganisation. | | | | | |
Green background is the promoted team. N = Midlands 2 West (North) (formerly Midlands 3 West (North)) and S = Midlands 2 West (South) (formerly Midlands 3 West (South))

== Number of league titles ==
- Camp Hill (2)
- Lichfield (2)
- Ludlow (2)
- Moseley Oak (2) (Note: Moseley Oak's first title was when league was single division known as Midlands West 1 and club was known as Selly Oak.)
- Luctonians (2) (Note: Luctonians first title was when league was single division known as Midlands West 1.)
- Aston Old Edwardians (1)
- Bridgnorth (1)
- Burton (1)
- Leek (1)
- Longton (1) (Note: Longton's title was when league was single division known as Midlands West 1.)
- Lordswood Dixonians (1)
- Malvern (1) (Note: Malvern's title was when league was single division known as Midlands West 1.)
- Newbold-on-Avon (1) (Note: Newbold-on-Avon's title was when league was single division known as Midlands West 1.)
- Newport (Salop) (1) (Note: Newport's (Salop) title was when league was single division known as Midlands West 1.)
- Old Halesonians (1)
- Sandbach (1)
- Shrewsbury (1)
- Silhillians (1)
- Stoke-on-Trent (1)
- Stourbridge Lions (1)
- Sutton Coldfield (1) (Note: Sutton Coldfield's title was when league was single division known as Midlands West 1.)
- Whitchurch (1)
- Willenhall (1) (Note: Willenhall's title was when league was single division known as Midlands West 1.)
- Wolverhampton (1)

(Updated to season 2024–25)

== See also ==
- Midlands RFU
- North Midlands RFU
- Staffordshire RU
- English rugby union system
- Rugby union in England
