= Alexander McLaren =

Alexander McLaren may refer to:

- Alexander McLaren (politician) (1859–1916), member of the Legislative Assembly of Ontario
- Alexander McLaren (rugby union) (1910–1974), Scotland international rugby union player

== See also ==
- Alexander Ferguson MacLaren (1854–1917), Canadian manufacturer, exporter and politician
- Alexander Maclaren (1826–1910), Scottish Baptist minister and writer
