= Newport (Salop) RUFC =

English rugby union club

Newport (Salop)
- Full name: Newport (Salop) Rugby Union Football Club
- Union: North Midlands RFU
- Nickname(s): The Fishes, Newport Rangers, Newport Legion
- Founded: 1871; 155 years ago
- Location: Newport, Shropshire, England
- Region: West Midlands
- Ground: The Old Showground
- Chairman: Philip Davidson
- President: John Gough
- Director of Rugby: Steven Dolpin
- Coach: Craig Ingram / Benny Elliot
- Captain: Ricky Bailey
- League: Regional 1 North West
- 2025–26: 2nd
Team kit

Official website
- newportsaloprufc.co.uk

Newport RUFC is an English rugby team based at the Old Showground, just outside the town of Newport, Shropshire. They currently play in the fifth tier league of the English rugby union system, Regional 1 Midlands for the 2025/26, 2026/27 Season.

== History ==
Rugby was first played in Newport in 1871 when the new Headmaster of Adams' Grammar School, Tom Collins, introduced the game to the boys. In the same year a game was played between the school and a Town team on the Chetwynd End ground. In 1876 a Town team played Stafford and lost. It seems that, after 1882 when, again, there was a local newspaper report of a match between Newport and Stafford at both town and school levels, there is no further record of rugby being played in the Newport District, apart from at school level, until 1932, when a club was formed at Shifnal. Many of the players were from Newport, being the school masters and boys from Adams' Grammar. One of those stars of the early days was Ron Anderson, a master at Adams', who later played for and served Newport RUFC for many years, including eighteen years as president. As with a large number of clubs, the Second World War curtailed activities and at the cessation of hostilities the club was never reformed.

When the war ended, an ex-soldier, Roy "Squash" Lemon, settled in Newport. He had previously played for Torquay and during the war for the Combined Services (Far East) in a match against the "All Blacks". He was a Second Row who was missing his rugby. Having decided to resolve this matter, he placed a notice in a local newspaper, calling on "All like-minded persons and any other interested parties" to attend a meeting. That meeting, in 1947, agreed to start Newport (Salop) Rugby Union Football Club and since that time the club has grown in stature.

The first match was against the Royal Navy Fleet Air Arm based at Hinstock, which resulted in a 6 all draw. Among the local teams played in that first season were Shrewsbury and Old Whitchurchians. The home games were played at Adams' Grammar School and the teams changed at the Vine Vaults Public House. The Club colours were adopted as maroon and white hoops and are still the colours today.

In 1948 a second XV was fielded for the first time and in 1949 the club rented a ground at Chetwynd End and played there, on two pitches, until 1981. By 1955 a third XV was added and in 1957 a fourth team. In 1956 the club converted a warehouse in Water Lane into a clubhouse with two changing rooms, with separate showers rooms downstairs and a club room with bar upstairs. The renovation cost £400. This work provided the club with its unique atmosphere for the next 25 years. In 1962 a colts XV was formed and coached by Reg Eales, a sports master at the then Newport Modern School, now the Burton Borough School. The side contained a large number of boys from that school. This squad grew in strength over the years with large numbers of those boys progressing into the first XV. Over the years colts from Newport have represented the club at Shropshire and the North Midlands levels with some going on to play for the Midlands and in England Trials. Throughout the 1960s the fixture list of the club was strengthened and included such clubs as Dudley Kingswinford, Bromsgrove, Sutton Coldfield, Lichfield and Kidderminster. All of these clubs were considered to be of a high standard at that time.

In 1950 and after protracted arguments with the RFU Newport were allowed to start the Newport (Salop) RUFC Challenge Cup, which is now commonly called the "Shropshire Cup". This cup is still being played for today and outside Internationals it is thought to be one of the oldest rugby cup competition in existence. In 1981 Newport moved to the Showground site off of Forton Road, just a field away from the old pitches at Chetwynd End. A new club house was built and four pitches were laid out. The first XV pitch took the central position in the then Showground main ring. The club was officially opened with a match against a strong star-studded team Presidents XV which included eight internationals and one Barbarian. The Presidents XV won 50 points to 36 points.

With the advent of leagues in 1987, Newport was placed in North Midlands 1. Between 1992–93 and 1994–95 saw promotion from that league, through Midlands West 2 and Midlands West 1 to Midlands 2 West (level 6). A large number of the first XV started rugby with the junior section of the club. Junior rugby is now a feature every Sunday morning with teams from under-8's to under-17's turning out for training or matches on a regular basis. Various sides have competed in fixtures against such side as Moseley, Worcester, Orrell, Northampton and Bath.

The "Shropshire Cup" The Newport (Salop) RUFC Challenge Cup, now known as the "Shropshire Cup" was originally donated by Arthur Hughes and Reg Walker, relations of Roy "Squash" Lemon, who was acknowledged as the instigator of Newport (Salop) RUFC. The cup was to be competed for by any Shropshire clubs in a knockout format. In the 1949–50 season, when the competition first started, the RFU frowned upon such competitions. However, after a long period of time and many letters passing between the RFU and the club permission was finally granted with the first competition taking place at the end of the 1949–50 season. It can be said that the "Shropshire Cup" is the oldest "Inter-Clubs" Trophy competition in existence. RAF Tern Hill were the first winners of the cup.

The 6th Training Regiment, Oswestry, the forefathers of Oswestry won the 1952 final. In those early days teams from the armed forces, such as RAF Tern Hill and RAF Stoke Heath, dominated. However, the farmers from Harper Adams along with the clubs from Shrewsbury, Old Whitchurchians and Newport made certain that the military did not have it all their own way. Newport first took hold of the cup in a drawn match against Shrewsbury in 1954. Not being content with that the following year they also drew, this time with RAF Stoke Heath. However, in 1957 they first won the cup outright.

The original rules stated that if a team won the competition on three successive years the cup would remain their property. Bridgnorth were the first to win the cup on three successive years, 1972, 1973 and 1974. Due to the popularity of the competition Bridgnorth generously returned the cup in order that the competition could continue. It was also decided that only clubs winning the cup on three successive years will be engraved onto it, this was due to the lack of space. Since that time only Whitchurch 1981, 1982 and 1983 as well as 1985, 1986 and 1987 and Newport 1993, 1994 and 1995 have appeared on the cup. After Newport won the cup in 1995 it was then decided that the cup would always remain the property of Newport but would be played for on an annual basis with the winning club retaining possession of the cup for one year only. Newport is now the clear leaders with a record numbers of wins, closely followed by Whitchurch, Shrewsbury and Bridgnorth. Newport hold the most number of consecutive wins with five, 1993 to 1997

== Teams ==
Mens 1st XV Mens 2nd XV Mens 3rd XV Mens 4th XV Veterans

Womens 1st XV

Touch Rugby Squad

Colts U16 U15 U14 U13 U12 U11 U10 U9 U8 U7

== Honours ==
- North Midlands 1 champions: 1992–93
- Midlands West 1 (Note: Not to be confused with Midlands 1 West.) champions: 1994–95
- Midlands 3 West (north v south) promotion play-off winners: 2004–05
- Midlands 2 (east v west) promotion play-off winners: 2006–07
- North Midlands Cup winners (2): 2010–11, 2013–14, 2017-18
- Midlands 1 West champions (2): 2014–15, 2016–17
