= Leek RUFC =

English rugby union club

Leek
- Full name: Leek Rugby Club
- Union: Staffordshire RU
- Founded: 1923; 103 years ago
- Location: Cheddleton, Staffordshire, England
- League: Regional 1 North West
- 2025–26: 5th

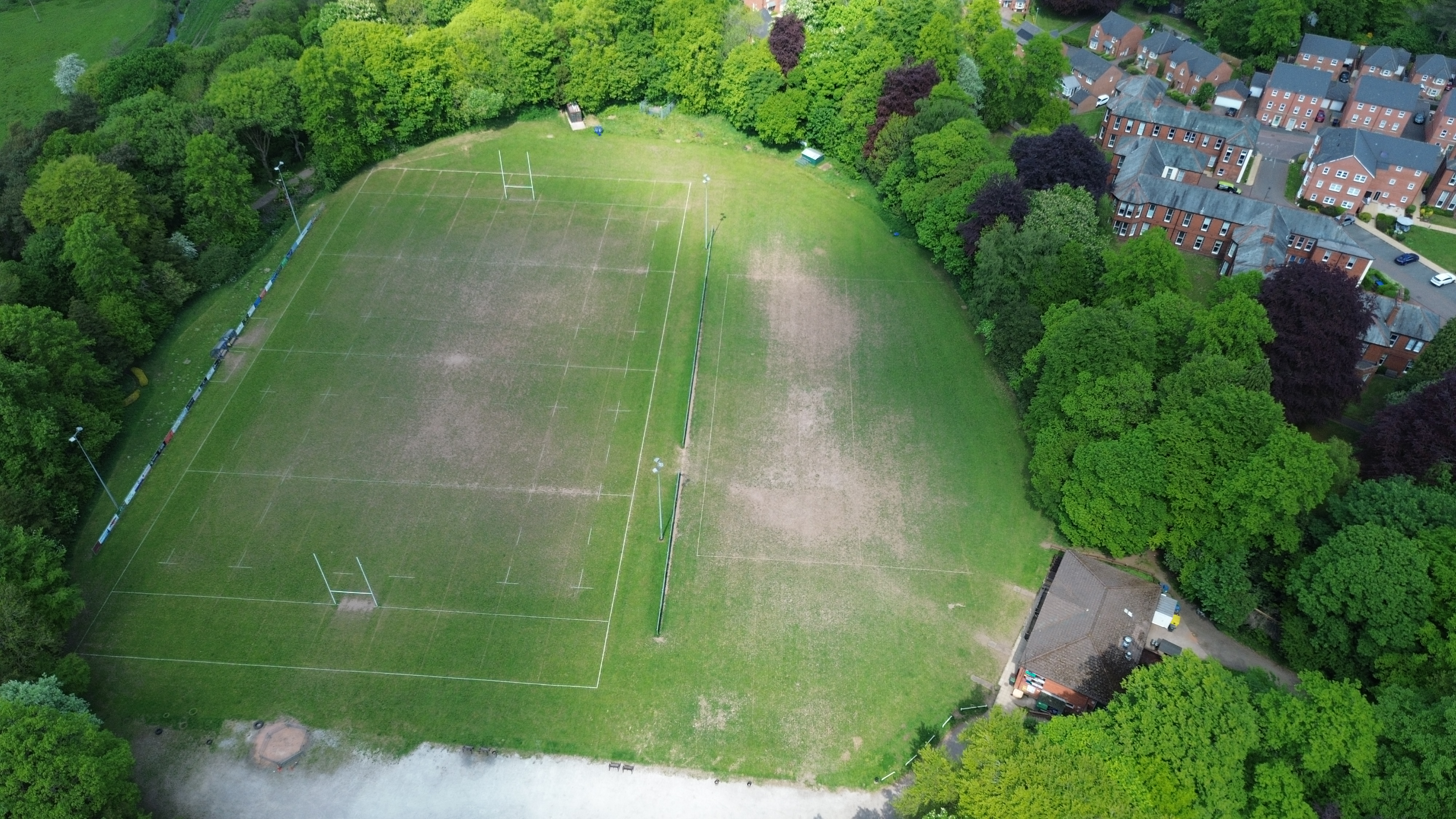
Aerial view of Leek Rugby Club Location

Leek Rugby Club is an English rugby union team based in the village of Cheddleton, near Leek, Staffordshire. The first XV currently play in Regional 1 North West, a fifth tier league in the English rugby union system. This is the highest level at which the club has played and follows promotion as champions from Regional 2 North Midlands in 2022–23. The club also runs two other senior teams, a colts side, a womens side and junior teams for both boys and girls.

== Honours ==
- Regional 2 North Midlands champions: 2022–23
- Midlands 2 West (North) champions: 2021–22
- Midlands 2 West (North) champions: 2013–14
- Midlands 3 West (North) champions: 2009–10
- Midlands 4 West (North) champions: 2006–07

== Notable former players ==
- Jenny Hesketh: Wales, Bristol Bears
- Morgan Richardson: Leicester Tigers
- Andy Poole
- Joe Cooper Sandbach RUFC

== Official website ==
- Official club website
