= Alexander McLaren (rugby union) =

- Born: David Alexander McLaren; 29 August 1910 Brancepeth, England
- Died: 17 February 1974 (aged 63) Brancepeth, England

Rugby union career
- Position: Lock
Amateur team(s)
Years	Team	Apps	(Points)
- Durham City
Provincial / State sides
Years	Team	Apps	(Points)
1929	Anglo-Scots		
1931	Scotland Possibles		
1931	Durham County		
International career
Years	Team	Apps	(Points)
1931	Scotland	1	(0)

Alexander McLaren (29 August 1910 – 24 February 1974) was a Scotland international rugby union player.

== Rugby Union career ==
=== Amateur career ===
McLaren played for Durham City. He captained the side.

=== Provincial career ===
He played for Anglo-Scots in the December 1929 match against Provinces District.

He played for Scotland Possibles in the 1931 final trial match.

He played for Durham County.

=== International career ===
He was capped once for Scotland in 1931.

== Rowing career ==
For many years he stroked a Durham City crew.

== Farming career ==
His grandfather and then father owned a farm at East Parks at Brancepeth, in the family since 1883. This passed to Alexander on his death in 1931.

Alexander was born at the farm. He was noted for keeping pigs.

== Family ==
His grandfather Peter McLaren from Scotland married Janet Pattullo from Angus, Scotland. They moved to Durham and took on a farm in 1883.

His father was Henry Pattullo MacLaren (1873-1931) was then born in Durham. His mother was Agnes Mary Tiernan Graham (1878-1950) from Paisley.

Alexander married Marguerite Frances Bell (1912-2001) in 1938 at St. Helen's Church in Low Fell.
