= Tamworth RUFC =

English rugby union football club

Tamworth
- Full name: Tamworth Rugby Union Football Club
- Union: Staffordshire RU
- Founded: 1925; 101 years ago
- Location: Tamworth, Staffordshire, England
- Ground: Wigginton Park
- Chairman: Keith Borthwick
- Coach: John Smith
- Captain: Jamie Lawrence
- League: Counties 1 Midlands West (North)
- 2025–26: 11th
Team kit

Official website
- clubs.rfu.com/Clubs/portals/TamworthRUFC/

Tamworth Rugby Union Football Club is an English rugby union club which plays in the seventh tier Counties 1 Midlands West (North), following their relegation from Regional 2 North Midlands in season 2024–25.

== Honours ==
- Staffordshire Intermediate Cup winners (2): 2009, 2011
- Midlands 3 West (North) champions: 2015–16
