= Old Halesonians RFC =

English rugby union club, based in Worcestershire

Old Halesonians
- Full name: Old Halesonians Rugby Football Club
- Union: North Midlands RFU
- Founded: 1930; 96 years ago
- Location: Hagley, Worcestershire, England
- Ground: Wassell Grove
- Chairman: Brad Vernon
- Coach: Sam Herrington
- League: Regional 2 West Midlands
- 2024–25: 8th

Official website
- www.oldhalesoniansrfc.co.uk

Old Halesonians Rugby Football Club is an English rugby union team based in Hagley, Worcestershire. The club run three senior men’s sides, a women’s team, a veterans team, a colts team and junior teams ranging from under-7s to under-17s. The first XV currently plays in Regional 2 West Midlands, a sixth tier league in the English rugby union system, following their relegation from Regional 1 Midlands at the end of the 2023–24 season.

== Honours ==
- North Midlands 2 champions: 1990–91
- North Midlands Shield winners: 2006–07
- Midlands 4 West (North) champions: 2007–08
- Midlands 3 West (North) champions: 2008–09
- Midlands Division 1 West champions: 2012–13
- Regional 2 West Midlands champions: 2022–23
- North Midlands Cup winners: 2014–15
