= Bridgnorth RFC =

English rugby union club

Bridgnorth
- Full name: Bridgnorth Rugby Club
- Union: North Midlands RFU
- Founded: 1975; 51 years ago
- Location: Bridgnorth, Shropshire
- Ground: Edgar Davis Ground
- League: Regional 1 Midlands
- 2025–26: 7th

Bridgnorth Rugby Club is an English rugby union club based in Bridgnorth, Shropshire. The first XV team currently play in Regional 1 Midlands, having reached the national levels of the sport for the first time in 2016 following back-to-back promotions.

== Honours ==
- North Midlands 1 champions: 1998–99
- Midlands 3 West (North) champions 2000–01
- Midlands 3 West (north v south) promotion play-off winners: 2005–06
- Midlands 2 West (North) champions 2014–15
- Midlands 1 West champions 2015–16
- North Midlands Plate winners (2): 2017, 2018
- North Midlands Cup winners: 2019
