= Stoke-on-Trent RUFC =

English rugby union club

Stoke-on-Trent
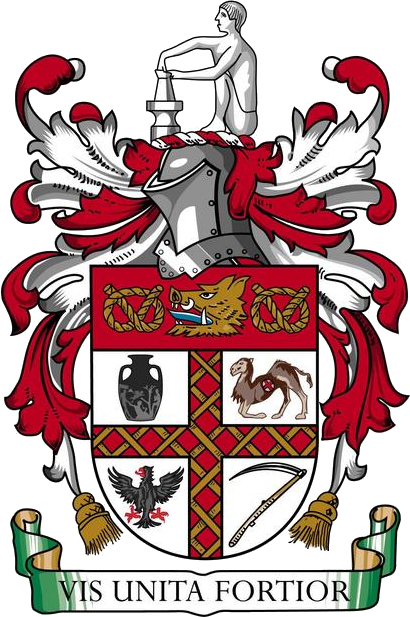
- Full name: Stoke-on-Trent Rugby Union Football Club
- Union: Staffordshire Rugby Union
- Location: Stoke-on-Trent, Staffordshire, England
- Ground: Hartwell Lane (Capacity: 2,000)
- League: Regional 2 Midlands
- 2024–25: 11th (relegated to Regional 2 Midlands North
Team kit

Official website
- www.stokerufc.co.uk

Stoke-on-Trent Rugby Union Football Club is a rugby union club located to the east of Barlaston near Stoke-on-Trent, Staffordshire. The first XV currently play in Regional 2 Midlands North, a sixth tier league in the English rugby union system, following their relegation from Regional 1 North West at the end of season 2024–25.

== Early league history ==
When league rugby was introduced in 1987, Stoke-on-Trent was placed in Midlands Division 1 and won promotion to Area 4 North in their first season. However, after two seasons they were relegated back to tier 5, having narrowly escaped relegation the previous season and in their relegation season of 1989–90 they lost every league game. They won immediate promotion back to Area 4 North and stayed there until they were placed in a new fifth tier – Courage League Division 5 – following a league structure by the RFU. They remained in the North Division until another restructure in 1996 saw them move back to the fourth tier - National 4 North - but after just a single season they were relegated to Midlands Division 1.

== Honours ==
- Midlands Division 1 champions (2): 1987–88, 1991–92
- Staffordshire Senior Cup winners (2): 1992–93, 1995–96
- Midlands 3 West (north v south) promotion play-off winners (2): 2002–03, 2007–08
- Midlands 2 West (North) champions: 2011–12
