= Handsworth RUFC =

Junior rugby club formed in 1887, originally in Handsworth now in Walsall

(England) Handsworth
- Full name: Handsworth Rugby Union Football Club
- Union: Staffordshire RU
- Founded: 1887; 138 years ago
- Location: Walsall, West Midlands, England
- Ground: Charles Lewis Memorial Ground
- Chairman: Simon Edwards
- President: Alan Rogers
- Coach: Julian Roderick
- Captain: Jagpal Chima
- League: Counties 2 Midlands West (North)
- 2021–22: 6th
Team kit

Official website
- handsworthrufc.rfu.club

Handsworth Rugby Football Club is a junior rugby club formed in 1887, originally in the area of Birmingham known as Handsworth but with its ground now in nearby Walsall.

== Competition ==
The First XV currently competes in Midlands 3 West (North) in the Midlands Division

== Address ==
The Charles Lewis Memorial Ground, 450 Birmingham Road, Walsall, West Midlands, WS5 3JP

== Club honours ==
- Staffordshire 1 champions (3): 1988–89, 1991–92, 2002–03
- Staffordshire/Warwickshire 1 champions: 1999–00
- Midlands 6 West (North) champions: 2006–07
- Midlands 5 West (North) champions: 2007–08
- Staffordshire Intermediate Cup winners: 2012
- Midlands 3 West (North) champions: 2014–15

== See also ==
- Midlands RFU
- Staffordshire RU
