= Sutton Coldfield RFC =

English rugby union club, based in the West Midlands

Sutton Coldfield
- Full name: Sutton Coldfield Rugby Football Club
- Union: North Midlands RFU, Warwickshire RFU
- Founded: 1921; 104 years ago
- Location: Sutton Coldfield, West Midlands, England
- Region: West Midlands
- Ground: Roger Smoldon Ground
- Chairman: Geoff Fletcher
- President: Marcia Daniels
- Director of Rugby: Sean Harrison
- Coach(es): Nathan Burchell, Charlie Byrne, Dave Smith, Tom Foulsham
- Captain: Tom Harris
- Most caps: Steve McCormack
- Top scorer: Alex White
- League: Counties 1 Midlands West (North)
- 2024–25: 1st (promoted to Regional 2 North Midlands)

Official website
- www.suttoncoldfieldrfc.com

Sutton Coldfield Rugby Club is an English rugby union team based in Sutton Coldfield, West Midlands. The club runs four senior sides, a ladies team, a veterans team and a full range of junior teams. The first XV play in Regional 2 West Midlands, the sixth tier of the English rugby union system; they were crowned championsof Counties 1 Midlands West (North) in 2024–25, with a perfect winning season, collecting a try bonus point in every league game of the season.

== Honours ==
1st XV:

- Midlands 1 West champions (2): 1988–89 (Note: 1988–89 title was when division was known as Midlands 2 West.), 2011–12
- Midlands West 1 (Note: Not to be confused with Midlands 1 West.) champions: 1993–94
- Midlands 3 West (South) champions: 2007–08
- Counties 1 Midlands West (North) Champions: 2024–25

Youth:

- (U14) North Midlands Cup champions: 2015–16
- (U18) Fred Rowley Cup Champions 2024–25
