= Lichfield RUFC =

English rugby union club

Lichfield
- Full name: Lichfield Rugby Union Football Club
- Union: Staffordshire RU
- Founded: 1874; 152 years ago
- Location: Lichfield, Staffordshire, England
- Region: Midlands
- Ground: Cooke Fields (Capacity: 5,460 (460 seats))
- League: Regional 1 Midlands
- 2025–26: 6th
Team kit

Official website
- www.lichfieldrufc.com

Lichfield Rugby Union Football Club is a rugby union club based in the city of Lichfield, Staffordshire. The first XV currently play in Regional 1 Midlands, a fifth tier league in the English rugby union system, following their promotion from Midlands 2 East (North). It is one of the oldest rugby football clubs still in active in England, although the oldest in Staffordshire is Burton Rugby Union Football Club, which was founded in 1870. The club runs three senior teams, a veterans team, two women's teams and a youth section ranging from under sevens to colts and includes a women's under-18 team.

== History ==
Lichfield Rugby Union Football Club was founded in 1874 based at the cricket club ground and played both association and rugby forms of the game. In 1890 the association football section broke away to form the City Football Club Lichfield Rugby Union Football Club was re-formed in 1925. It played on various sites for a time until a permanent ground was acquired in Boley Lane in 1961. The current ground, Cooke fields, was opened in 1985.

== Ground ==
The capacity at Cooke Fields was listed by a club official as being around 5,460, with 5,000 standing and 460 seated in the grandstand. Facilities included a large club house with bar, cafeteria and sponsors lounge.

== Honours ==
- Staffordshire Senior Cup winners (13): 1979, 1982, 1984, 1985, 1986, 1987, 1990, 1991, 1997, 2011, 2013, 2014, 2016
- Midlands 2 West (North) champions (2): 2005–06, 2009–10
- Midlands Division 1 West champions: 2013–14, 2021–22
