= 1929–30 Scottish Districts season =

Rugby union competition

- Countries: Scotland
- Date: 1929–30
- Matches played: 1

The 1929–30 Scottish Districts season is a record of all the rugby union matches for Scotland's district teams.

== History ==
Glasgow District beat Edinburgh District in the Inter-City match.

The combined North and South district were to play the Anglo-Scots on 21 December 1929.

== Results ==
Date	Try	Conversion	Penalty	Dropped goal	Goal from mark	Notes
1905–1947	3 points	2 points	3 points	4 points	3 points	

=== Inter-City ===
7 December 1929

Glasgow District	20 – 8	Edinburgh District
	Report

Old Anniesland
Attendance: 6,000
Referee: R. L. Scott

Glasgow District:
Edinburgh District:

=== Other Scottish matches ===
21 December 1929

Anglo-Scots	–	Provinces District
	Report

Mansfield Park, Hawick
Referee: T. Sturrock (Royal HSFP)

Anglo-Scots:
Provinces District:

=== English matches ===
No other District matches played.

=== International matches ===
No touring matches this season.
