= Longton RUFC =

Longton
- Full name: Longton Rugby Club
- Union: Staffordshire RU
- Founded: 1935; 90 years ago (as Old Longtonians)
- Location: Longton, Stoke-on-Trent, Staffordshire, England
- Ground(s): Trentham Fields
- Chairman: TBA
- President: Steve Tams
- Coach(es): George Glenn
- Captain(s): Pete Wilshaw and Richard Thompson
- League(s): Counties 1 Midlands West North
- 2021–22: 5th
Team kit

Official website
- www.longtonrugby.co.uk

Longton Rugby Club is an English rugby union team based in Longton, Staffordshire. The club runs two (sometimes 3) senior sides, a social side, and a full set of junior teams. The first XV currently plays in Counties 1 Midlands West (North), a seventh tier league in the English rugby union system.

== History ==
Formed as Old Longtonians by members of Longton High School in 1935, the club played its first games at Cocknage Road in Dresden just outside of Longton. The club revived after World War II with games first taking place at Longton High School and Meir Aerodrome, before finding a more permanent home at Roughcote Lane by 1975.

By 1994 the club had changed its name to Longton Rugby Club and in 2008 moved to larger facilities at Trentham Fields in Trentham Lakes, Stoke-on-Trent. The 1990s and early 2000s were a period of remarkable success for Longton as it became the top club side in Staffordshire, winning four league titles and seven county cups between 1992 and 2010.

== Honours ==
- Staffordshire/Warwickshire champions: 1991–92
- Midlands West 1 (Note: Not to be confused with Midlands West 1.) champions: 1996–97
- Staffordshire Senior Cup winners (7): 1998, 2004, 2006, 2007, 2008, 2009, 2010
- Midlands 2 champions: 1998–99
- Midlands 1 champions: 2002–03
