= Burton RFC =

English rugby union club

Burton
- Full name: Burton Rugby Football Club
- Union: Staffordshire RU
- Nickname: Crofters
- Founded: 1870; 156 years ago
- Location: Burton upon Trent, Staffordshire, England
- Ground: Battlestead Croft (Capacity: 5,500 (600 seats))
- President: Craig Dutton
- Captain(s): Alex Nesbitt & Debbie Edwards
- Most caps: Matthew Tivey 300+
- League: Regional 1 North West
- 2024–25: 4th
Team kit

Official website
- www.pitchero.com/clubs/burton/

Burton Rugby Club is an English rugby union team based in Burton upon Trent in Staffordshire. The club operates six senior teams, including an under-22s team, academy sides and a full range of junior teams. The first XV currently play in the Regional 1 North West following their promotion as champions of Midlands 1 West at the end of the 2017–18 season.

== History ==
Burton Rugby Club was formed on 5 October 1870 as Burton Football Club, retaining that name until the word 'rugby' was added in 2001. The club played at Peel Croft, from 1910 until it moved to a new ground, Battlestead Croft in Tatenhill in 2020.

== Honours ==
- Midland Counties Cup winners (2): 1882–83, 1887–88
- Staffordshire Senior Cup winners (7): 1992, 2000, 2005, 2012, 2015, 2017, 2018, 2019
- Midlands 1 West champions (4): 1992–93 (Note: 1992–93 title was when league was single division known as Midlands 2.), 2004–05 (Note: 2004–05 title was when league was known as Midlands 2 West.), 2009–10, 2017–18
- Midlands 3 West (North) champions: 2003–04
- Midlands 1 (east v west) promotion play-off winner: 2013–14
