= 2017–18 RFU Intermediate Cup =

Tournament details
- Countries: England
- Tournament format(s): knockout
- Date: 2 September 2017 – 6 May 2018

Tournament statistics
- Teams: 95

Final
- Venue: Twickenham Stadium
- Champions: Camberley (1st title)
- Runners-up: Droitwich

The 2017–18 RFU Intermediate Cup is the 22nd version of the RFU Intermediate Cup (9th using the name RFU Intermediate Cup) national competition for clubs at level 7 of the English rugby union system. The cup consists of 91 clubs divided into four regions. The winners of each region then advance to the national semi-finals with the final being held at Twickenham Stadium in London at the end of the season, along with the RFU Intermediate Cup and RFU Junior Vase finals.

The 2017–18 champions were London & South East winners, Camberley, who thrashed Midlands winners, Droitwich, 63–14 in the Twickenham final. It was Camberley's first ever intermediate cup title, but the 7th won by London & South East based clubs, tying them with the northern region who also had 7 victories.

== London & South East Intermediate Cup ==
The London & South East Intermediate Cup involves a knock-out competition with 1st round, 2nd round, 3rd round, semi-finals and final. The winners of the London & South East Intermediate Cup then go on to the national Intermediate Cup semi-finals where they face the winners of the South West Intermediate Cup. There are 25 teams involved in the London & South East Intermediate Cup, all of which are 1st XV sides, coming from the following unions and level 7 leagues.

Union(s)	League(s) / Level	Participants
Eastern Counties	London 2 North East (7)	2
Essex	London 2 North East (7)	5
Essex	London 2 South East (7)	1
Hampshire	London 3 South West	2
Kent	London 2 South East	3
Middlesex	London 3 North West	4
Middlesex	London 2 South East	1
Surrey	London 3 South West	4 (Note: One of the Surrey clubs, London Exiles, are members of both the Middlesex and Surrey unions but play in Surrey county cup competitions.)
Sussex	London 2 South East	3

=== Round 1 ===
Byes: Barking (L2SE), Camberley (L2SW), Chelmsford (L2NE), Chiswick (L2NW), Dover (L2SE), Gosport & Fareham (L2SW) and Hampstead (L2NW)

Date	Home	Score	Away
14/10/2017	Charlton Park (L2SE)	30–12	Old Reigatian (L2SW)
14/10/2017	Farnham (L2SW)	36–33	Beckenham (L2SE)
14/10/2017	Hammersmith & Fulham (L2NW)	18–48	Rochford Hundred (L2NE)
14/10/2017	Haywards Heath (L2SE)	12–37	London Exiles (L2SW)
14/10/2017	Horsham (L2SE)	HWO	Eastleigh (L2SW)
14/10/2017	Norwich (L2NE)	HWO	Harlow (L2NE)
14/10/2017	Old Cooperians (L2NE)	HWO	Cantabrigian (L2NE)
14/10/2017	Twickenham (L2SW)	28–14	Hove (L2SE)
14/10/2017	Woodford (L2NE)	45–5	Harrow (L2NW)

=== Round 2 ===
Date	Home	Score	Away
18/11/2017	Charlton Park (L2SE)	HWO	Twickenham (L2SW)
18/11/2017	Chelmsford (L2NE)	0–48	Woodford (L2NE)
18/11/2017	Dover (L2SE)	7–43	Camberley (L2SW)
18/11/2017	Gosport & Fareham (L2SW)	29–31	Farnham (L2SW)
18/11/2017	Hampstead (L2NW)	AWO	Rochford Hundred (L2NE)
18/11/2017	London Exiles (L2SW)	37–27	Horsham (L2SE)
18/11/2017	Norwich (L2NE)	18–10	Chiswick (L2NW)
18/11/2017	Old Cooperians (L2NE)	35–24	Barking (L2NE)

=== Round 3 ===
Date	Home	Score	Away
20/01/2018	Camberley (L2SW)	HWO	Woodford (L2NE)
20/01/2018	Charlton Park (L2SE)	17–14	Farnham (L2SW)
20/01/2018	Old Cooperians (L2NE)	12–24	Norwich (L2NE)
20/01/2018	Rochford Hundred (L2NE)	38–0	London Exiles (L2SW)

=== Semi-finals ===
Date	Home	Score	Away
24/02/2018	Camberley (L2SW)	47–8	Rochford Hundred (L2NE)
24/02/2018	Norwich (L2NE)	24–32	Charlton Park (L2SE)

=== Final ===
The winners of the London & South East Intermediate Cup final would advance to the national semi-finals.

Date	Home	Score	Away
17/03/2018	Charlton Park (L2SE)	12–33	Camberley (L2SW)

== Midlands Intermediate Cup ==
The Midlands Intermediate Cup is a direct knockout cup with a 1st round, 2nd round, 3rd round, quarter-finals, semi-finals and final The winner of the final goes forward to the National Intermediate Cup semi-finals where they face the winners of the Northern section. The competition involves 41 clubs from the following unions and level 7 leagues:

Union(s)	League(s) / Level	Participants
Cheshire	Midlands 2 West (North) (7)	1 (Note: Crewe & Nantwich are a member of the Cheshire RFU but play in the Midlands regional leagues.)
East Midlands	Midlands 2 East (South) (7)	4
Leicestershire	Midlands 2 East (North) (7)	2
Leicestershire	Midlands 2 East (South) (7)	3
North Midlands	Midlands 2 West (North) (7)	6
North Midlands	Midlands 2 West (South) (7)	3
Notts, Lincs & Derbyshire	Midlands 2 East (North) (7)	9
Staffordshire	Midlands 2 West (North) (7)	4 (Note: One of the Staffordshire clubs, Walsall, are joint members of both the Staffordshire and North Midlands unions but play in Staffordshire county cup competitions.)
Warwickshire	Midlands 2 West (North) (7)	1
Warwickshire	Midlands 2 West (South) (7)	6
Warwickshire	Midlands 2 East (South) (7)	2

=== Round 1 ===
Byes: 23 teams received a bye into the second round

Date	Home	Score	Away
16/09/2017	Stamford (M2ES)	AWO	Lincoln (M2EN)
16/09/2017	Ashbourne (M2EN)	38–40	Whitchurch (M2WN)
16/09/2017	Kenilworth (M2WS)	14–22	Olney (M2ES)
16/09/2017	Ludlow (M2WN)	31–19	Evesham (M2WS)
16/09/2017	Matlock (M2EN)	29–14	Tamworth (M2WN)
16/09/2017	Newcastle (Staffs) (M2WN)	10–25	Dronfield (M2EN)
16/09/2017	Oakham (M2ES)	20–27	Newark (M2EN)
16/09/2017	Old Saltleians (M2WN)	HWO	Southam (M2WS)
16/09/2017	Silhillians (M2WS)	15–12	Cleobury Mortimer (M2WN)

=== Round 2 ===
Date	Home	Score	Away
07/10/2017	Bakewell Mannerians (M2EN)	AWO	Crewe & Nantwich (M2WN)
07/10/2017	Droitwich (M2WS)	36–8	Walsall (M2WN)
07/10/2017	Dronfield (M2EN)	17–25	Leek (M2WN)
07/10/2017	Earlsdon (M2WS)	5–3	Veseyans (M2WN)
07/10/2017	Leamington (M2WS)	20–27	Long Buckby (M2ES)
07/10/2017	Lincoln (M2EN)	HWO	Belgrave (M2ES)
07/10/2017	Market Harborough (M2ES)	AWO	Southwell (M2EN)
07/10/2017	Newark (M2EN)	HWO	Stewarts & Lloyds (M2ES)
07/10/2017	Nottingham Casuals (M2EN)	26–18	Old Saltleians (M2WN)
07/10/2017	Old Laurentians (M2ES)	17–3	Loughborough (M2EN)
07/10/2017	Old Yardleians (M2WS)	7–22	Kidderminster Carolians (M2WN)
07/10/2017	Olney (M2ES)	21–13	Berkswell & Balsall (M2WS)
07/10/2017	Pinley (M2ES)	AWO	Coalville (M2EN)
07/10/2017	Silhillians (M2WS)	26–36	Ludlow (M2WN)
07/10/2017	West Bridgford (M2EN)	24–15	Spartans (M2WN)
07/10/2017	Whitchurch (M2WN)	HWO	Matlock (M2EN)

=== Round 3 ===
Date	Home	Score	Away
28/10/2017	Coalville (M2EN)	46–19	Olney (M2ES)
28/10/2017	Crewe & Nantwich (M2WN)	27–26	West Bridgford (M2EN)
28/10/2017	Kidderminster Carolians (M2WN)	12–27	Earlsdon (M2WS)
28/10/2017	Leek (M2WN)	39–17	Lincoln (M2EN)
28/10/2017	Long Buckby (M2ES)	13–15	Southwell (M2EN)
28/10/2017	Ludlow (M2WN)	AWO	Droitwich (M2WS)
28/10/2017	Newark (M2EN)	43–10	Old Laurentians (M2ES)
28/10/2017	Whitchurch (M2WN)	39–14	Nottingham Casuals (M2EN)

=== Quarter-finals ===
Date	Home	Score	Away
18/11/2017	Coalville (M2EN)	12–57	Whitchurch (M2WN)
18/11/2017	Droitwich (M2WS)	34–10	Crewe & Nantwich (M2WN)
18/11/2017	Earlsdon (M2WS)	16–8	Newark (M2EN) (Note: Despite initially losing their second round game against Earlsdon, Newark were reinstated back into the Midlands Intermediate Cup after Earlsdon were later disqualified for fielding an ineligible player.)
18/11/2017	Southwell (M2EN)	14–46	Leek (M2WN)

=== Semi-finals ===
Date	Home	Score	Away
20/01/2017	Leek (M2WN)	12–17	Droitwich (M2WS)
20/01/2017	Whitchurch (M2WN)	39–5	Newark (M2EN)

=== Final ===
The winners of the Midlands Intermediate Cup would advance to the National Intermediate Cup semi-finals.

Date	Home	Score	Away
17/03/2018	Whitchurch (M2WN)	7–19	Droitwich (M2WS)

== Northern Intermediate Cup ==
Unlike the other regional competitions, the Northern Intermediate Cup starts with a mini-league stage, in which the eligible clubs are placed in 2 regional pools of 3 teams each. The winners of each pool then face each other in the Northern Intermediate Cup final, with the winner advancing to the National Intermediate Cup semi-finals, where they will face the winners of the Midlands section. There are 6 teams (1st XV only) involved in the Northern Intermediate Cup representing the following unions and level 7 leagues:

Union(s)	League(s) / Level	Participants
Durham County	Durham/Northumberland 1 (7)	1
Cheshire	Lancs/Cheshire Division 1 (7)	1
Cumbria	North Lancashire/Cumbria (7)	1
Lancashire	North Lancashire/Cumbria (7)	1 (Note: Although the breakaway of 19 Lancashire RFU clubs at the start of the 2017–18 season affected Lancashire clubs' participation in the Senior and Junior Vases, they were still able to send a representative to the 2017–18 RFU Intermediate Cup.)
Northumberland	Durham/Northumberland 1 (7)	1
Yorkshire	Yorkshire 1 (7)	1

=== Pool 1 (West) ===
Pool 1
	Club	Played	Won	Drawn	Lost	Points For	Points Against	Points Difference	Points
1	Bowdon (LC1)	2	2	0	0	68	46	22	4
2	De La Salle (NLC)	2	1	0	1	59	53	6	2
3	Aspatria (NLC)	2	0	0	2	24	52	-2	0
2 points for a win, 1 point for a draw.

Date	Home	Score	Away
14/10/2017	De La Salle (NLC)	25–12	Aspatria (NLC)
18/11/2017	Bowdon (LC1)	41–34	De La Salle (NLC)
10/02/2018	Aspatria (NLC)	12–27	Bowdon (LC1)

=== Pool 2 (East) ===
Pool 2
	Club	Played	Won	Drawn	Lost	Points For	Points Against	Points Difference	Points
1	York (Y1)	2	2	0	0	179	12	167	4
2	Gateshead (DN1)	2	1	0	1	5	81	-76	2
3	Medicals (DN1)	2	0	0	2	7	98	-91	0
2 points for a win, 1 point for a draw.

Date	Home	Score	Away
14/10/2017	York (Y1)	98–7	Medicals (DN1)
18/11/2017	Medicals (DN1)	AWO	Gateshead (DN1)
17/02/2018	Gateshead (DN1)	5–81	York (Y1)

=== Final ===
The winners of the Pool 1 (West) and Pool 2 (East) would meet in the Northern Intermediate Cup final. The winners of this final would then advanced to the National Intermediate Cup semi-finals.

Date	Home	Score	Away
24/02/2018	York (Y1)	25–11	Bowdon (LC1)

== South West Intermediate Cup ==
The South West Intermediate Cup consist of three stages, with representatives from the different unions joining at different points. The Dorset & Wilts and Gloucestershire clubs first play in county based knock-out tournaments, with the winners advancing to either the Southern Counties or South West Counties area semi-finals, where they join the other south-west representatives. The winners of each area final then meet in the South West Intermediate Cup final to determine who goes through to the national semi-finals, where they face the winners of the London and South East section.

The South West Intermediate Cup involves 19 clubs (1st XV only) from the following unions and level 7 leagues:

Union(s)	League(s) / Level	Participants
Berkshire	Southern Counties North (7)	1
Buckinghamshire	Southern Counties North (7)	1
Cornwall	Tribute Western Counties West (7)	1
Devon	Tribute Western Counties West (7)	1
Dorset & Wilts	Southern Counties South (7)	7
Gloucestershire	Tribute Western Counties North (7)	6
Oxfordshire (7)	Southern Counties North (7)	1
Somerset	Tribute Western Counties North (7)	1

=== Stage 1 (Dorset & Wilts) ===
9 clubs were involved in the Dorset & Wilts RFU Intermediate Cup qualification. The winners would advanced to the Southern Counties semi-finals.

First round
Date	Home	Score	Away
23/09/2017	North Dorset (SCS)	26–20	Trowbridge (SCS)
Quarter-finals
23/09/2017	Corsham (SCS)	36–22	Marlborough (SCS)
23/09/2017	Devizes (SCS)	HWO	Blandford (SCS)
23/09/2017	Swanage & Wareham (SCS)	24–26	Sherborne (SCS)
14/10/2017	North Dorset	HWO	Swindon College Old Boys (SCS)
Semi-finals
18/11/2017	Devizes	12–30	Sherborne (SCS)
18/11/2017	North Dorset	22–10	Corsham (SCS)
Final
02/12/2017	North Dorset	17–20	Sherborne (SCS)

=== Stage 1 (Gloucestershire) ===
7 teams were involved in the Gloucestershire RFU Intermediate Cup qualification tournament. The winners of the competition would go through to the South West Counties final.

First round (Note: Cheltenham received a bye through to the semi-finals.)
Date	Home	Score	Away
02/09/2017	Old Bristolians (WCN)	24–21	Avonmouth Old Boys (WCN)
09/09/2017	Stroud (WCN)	13–43	Chosen Hill Former Pupils (WCN)
16/09/2017	Old Richians (WCN)	20–56	Coney Hill (WCN)
Semi-finals
30/09/2017	Chosen Hill Former Pupils (WCN)	40–26	Old Bristolians (WCN)
14/10/2017	Coney Hill (WCN)	HWO	Cheltenham (WCN)
Final
02/12/2017	Chosen Hill Former Pupils (WCN)	13–14	Coney Hill (WCN)

=== Stage 2 (Southern Counties) ===
The winners of the Dorset & Wilts Intermediate Cup would join representatives from the Berkshire, Buckinghamshire and Oxfordshire unions in the Southern Counties knock-out stage. The winners would advance to play the South West Counties winners in the south-west regional final.

Semi-finals
Date	Home	Score	Away
10/02/2018	Wallingford (SCN)	7–26	Beaconsfield (SCN)
10/02/2018	Windsor (SCN)	12–3	Sherborne (SCS)
Final
24/02/2018	Beaconsfield (SCN)	8–17	Windsor (SCN)

=== Stage 2 (South West Counties) ===
The winners of the Gloucestershire Intermediate Cup would meet the representatives from the Somerset RFU in the semi-final, while the representatives from the Cornwall RFU would face the representatives from the Devon RFU. The winners would advance to play the Southern Counties winners in the south-west regional final.

Semi-finals
Date	Home	Score	Away
10/02/2018	Coney Hill (WCN)	HWO	Chew Valley (WCN)
10/02/2018	St Austell (WCW)	HWO	Devonport Services (WCW)
Final
24/02/2018	Coney Hill (WCN)	65–17	St Austell (WCW)

=== Stage 3 (South West final) ===
The winners of the Southern Counties and South West Counties final would meet in the south-west regional final. The winners of this final would then advanced to the national semi-finals.

Date	Home	Score	Away
17/03/2018	Windsor (SCN)	19–34	Coney Hill (WCN)

== National Senior Vase ==
4 teams qualified from the regional vase competitions:

- London & South East Intermediate Cup winners – Camberley (L2SW)
- Midlands Intermediate Cup winners – Droitwich (M2WS)
- Northern Intermediate Cup winners – York (Y1)
- South West Intermediate Cup winners – Coney Hill (WCN)

The Midlands winners would face the North winners in the first semi-final, while the London & South East winners would face the South-West winners in the other, with the winners of each semi-final meeting in the Twickenham final. Home advantage in the semi-finals will be decided by a draw.

=== Semi-finals ===
Date	Home	Score	Away
31/03/2018	Coney Hill (WCN)	17–20	Camberley (L2SW)
31/03/2018	Droitwich (M2WS)	24–22	York (Y1)

=== Final ===
6 May 2018
15:00

Camberley (L2SW)	63–14	Droitwich (M2WS)
	Report

Twickenham Stadium, London

== See also ==
- 2017–18 Anglo-Welsh Cup
- 2017–18 British and Irish Cup
- 2017–18 RFU Senior Vase
- 2017–18 RFU Junior Vase
- English rugby union system
- List of English rugby union teams
- Rugby union in England
