= Regional 2 West Midlands =

Rugby union league in England

Regional 2 Midlands West
- Current season or competition: 2025–26 Regional 2 Midlands West
- Sport: Rugby union
- Instituted: 1987; 39 years ago (as Midlands 2 West)
- Number of teams: 12
- Country: England
- Holders: Moseley Oak (1st title) (2025–26)
- Most titles: Burton, Bromsgrove (4 titles)
- Website: England RFU

Regional 2 Midlands West is an English level 6 rugby union league for rugby clubs in the western region of the Midlands. It includes sides from Birmingham, Herefordshire, Shropshire, Staffordshire, Warwickshire, the West Midlands, Worcestershire and occasionally Cheshire, Derbyshire, Leicestershire and Oxfordshire. When this division began in 1987 it was known as Midlands 2 West, and has been restructured several times, most notably as a single division known as Midlands 2 between 1992 and 2000. It has been called Regional 2 Midlands West since 2022–23. The 2025-26 champions are Moseley Oak.

== 2026-27 ==
Departing were Moseley Oak, promoted to Regional 1 Midlands while Stratford-upon-Avon (11th) and Old Halesonians (12th) were relegated.

A week ahead of the new season, Edwardians (6th in 2025-26) announced they were withdrawing from the league due to "unforeseen circumstances" and instead would take the place of their 2XV in Counties 4 Midlands West (South East).

Team	Ground	Capacity	City/Area	Previous season
Dudley Kingswinford	Heathbrook	2,260 (260 seats)	Kingswinford, Dudley, West Midlands	Relegated from Regional 1 Midlands (11th)
Drybrook	Mannings Ground		Drybrook, Gloucestershire	Relegated from Regional 1 Midlands (10th - lost play off)
Hereford	Wyeside	3,200 (200 seats)	Hereford, Herefordshire	4th
Kenilworth	Glasshouse Lane		Kenilworth, Warwickshire	8th
Luctonians 2XV	Mortimer Park	2,500 (300 seats)	Kingsland, Herefordshire	3rd
Ludlow	The Linney		Ludlow, Shropshire	7th
Malvern	Spring Lane		Malvern, Worcestershire	9th
Shipston-on-Stour	Mayo Road	600	Shipston-on-Stour, Warwickshire	10th
Silhillians	The Memorial Ground		Solihull, West Midlands	5th
Stow-on-the-Wold	Oddington Road		Stow-on-the-Wold, Gloucestershire	2nd
Worcester	Offerton Lane		Worcester, Worcestershire	Promoted from Counties 1 Midlands West (South)

Locations of the 2026-27 Regional 2 Midlands West teams

== 2025–26 ==
=== Participating teams and locations ===
Departing were Newent, promoted to Regional 1 Midlands while Ledbury (11th) and Whitchurch (12th) were relegated to Counties 1 Midlands West (South) and Counties 1 Midlands West (North) respectively. Also leaving were Cheltenham on a level transfer to Regional 2 Severn.

Team	Ground	Capacity	City/Area	Previous season
Edwardians	Memorial Ground		Solihull, West Midlands	3rd
Hereford	Wyeside	3,200 (200 seats)	Hereford, Herefordshire	10th
Kenilworth	Glasshouse Lane		Kenilworth, Warwickshire	Relegated from Regional 1 Midlands (12th)
Luctonians 2XV	Mortimer Park	2,500 (300 seats)	Kingsland, Herefordshire	Promoted from Counties 1 Midlands West (South)
Ludlow	The Linney		Ludlow, Shropshire	5th
Malvern	Spring Lane		Malvern, Worcestershire	9th
Moseley Oak	Billesley Common	5,000 (1,300 seats)	Moseley, Birmingham, West Midlands	2nd
Old Halesonians	Wassell Grove		Hagley, Stourbridge, Worcestershire	8th
Shipston-on-Stour	Mayo Road	600	Shipston-on-Stour, Warwickshire	4th
Silhillians	The Memorial Ground		Solihull, West Midlands	Relegated from Regional 1 Midlands (11th)
Stow-on-the-Wold	Oddington Road		Stow-on-the-Wold, Gloucestershire	Level transfer from Regional 2 Severn (6th)
Stratford-upon-Avon	Loxley Road		Stratford-upon-Avon, Warwickshire	7th

Locations of the 2025–26 Regional 2 Midlands West teams
Locations of the 2025–26 Regional 2 Midlands West teams in West Midlands

=== League table ===
Regional 2 Midlands West 2025–26
	Team	Played	Won	Drawn	Lost	Points for	Points against	Points diff	Try bonus	Loss bonus	Points
1	Moseley Oak (P)	22	20	0	2	826	298	528	20	1	101
2	Stow-on-the-Wold	22	16	0	6	574	462	112	11	1	76
3	Luctonians II	22	14	0	8	515	425	90	10	1	67
4	Hereford	22	11	0	11	496	481	15	12	7	63
5	Silhillians	22	12	0	10	549	491	58	9	5	62
6	Edwardians	22	9	1	12	528	567	−39	14	7	59
7	Ludlow	22	11	0	11	442	492	−50	9	3	56
8	Kenilworth RFC	22	9	1	12	533	579	−46	13	5	56
9	Malvern	22	10	0	12	515	576	−61	11	3	54
10	Shipston-on-Stour	22	8	1	13	505	586	−81	10	4	48
11	Stratford-upon-Avon (R)	22	7	1	14	375	574	−199	8	1	39
12	Old Halesonians RFC (R)	22	3	0	19	436	763	−327	8	3	23
If teams are level at any stage, tiebreakers are applied in the following order: 1. Number of matches won 2. Difference between points for and against 3. Total number of points for 4. Aggregate number of points scored in matches between tied teams 5. Number of matches won excluding the first match, then the second and so on until the tie is settled
Mint background is the promotion place (1st); Green background is the promotion play-off places (2nd–5th); Pink background are the relegation play-off places (10th–11th); Salmon background is the relegation place (12th); Updated: 18 May 2026

== 2024–25 ==
=== Participating teams and locations ===
Departing were Silhillians, promoted to Regional 1 Midlands while Worcester Wanderers and Berkswell & Balsall were relegated. Stow-on-the-Wold moved on a level transfer to Regional 2 Severn. Joining were Old Halesonians, relegated from Regional 1 Midlands; Edwardians, promoted as champions from Counties 1 Midlands West (North) and Ledbury runner-up in Counties 1 Midlands West (South) – (Luctonians 2XV won the league but owing to league regulations were not permitted to be promoted to Level 6). Whitchurch were level transferred from Regional 2 North West.

Team	Ground	Capacity	City/Area	Previous season
Cheltenham	Newlands Park		Southam, Cheltenham, Gloucestershire	4th
Edwardians	Memorial Ground		Solihull, West Midlands	Promoted from Counties 1 Midlands West (North) (champions)
Hereford	Wyeside	3,200 (200 seats)	Hereford, Herefordshire	5th
Ledbury	Ross Road		Ledbury, Herefordshire	Promoted from Counties 1 Midlands West (South) (2nd)
Ludlow	The Linney		Ludlow, Shropshire	8th
Malvern	Spring Lane		Malvern, Worcestershire	10th
Moseley Oak	Billesley Common	5,000 (1,300 seats)	Moseley, Birmingham, West Midlands	8th
Newent	Recreation Ground		Newent, Gloucestershire	3rd
Old Halesonians	Wassell Grove		Hagley, Stourbridge, Worcestershire	Relegated from Regional 1 Midlands (11th)
Shipston-on-Stour	Mayo Road	600	Shipston-on-Stour, Warwickshire	9th
Stratford-upon-Avon	Loxley Road		Stratford-upon-Avon, Warwickshire	6th
Whitchurch	Edgeley Park		Whitchurch, Shropshire	Level transfer from Regional 2NW (6th)

Locations of the 2024–25 Regional 2 Midlands West teams

=== League table ===
Regional 2 Midlands West 2024–25
	Team	Played	Won	Drawn	Lost	Points for	Points against	Points diff	Try bonus	Loss bonus	Points	Points deducted
1	Newent (P)	22	21	1	0	811	287	524	16	0	103	
2	Moseley Oak	22	17	0	5	738	420	318	15	0	83	
3	Edwardians	22	15	0	7	600	483	117	13	5	78	
4	Shipston-on-Stour	22	12	1	9	736	481	255	14	2	66	
5	Ludlow	22	12	1	9	544	370	174	7	5	62	
6	Cheltenham	22	11	0	11	563	641	−78	14	3	56	
7	Stratford-upon-Avon	22	8	2	12	516	561	−45	7	6	49	
8	Old Halesonians RFC	22	8	0	14	393	603	−210	8	5	45	
9	Malvern	22	7	0	15	435	743	−308	8	2	38	
10	Hereford	22	6	2	14	391	558	−167	6	4	38	
11	Ledbury (R)	22	6	1	15	348	589	−241	5	4	36	
12	Whitchurch (R)	22	5	0	17	396	735	−339	5	5	25	
If teams are level at any stage, tiebreakers are applied in the following order: 1. Number of matches won 2. Difference between points for and against 3. Total number of points for 4. Aggregate number of points scored in matches between tied teams 5. Number of matches won excluding the first match, then the second and so on until the tie is settled
Green background is the promotion place. Pink background are the relegation places Updated: 25 October 2025; Source:

== 2023–24 ==
=== Participating teams and locations ===
Departing were Old Halesonians, promoted to Regional 1 Midlands whilst Droitwich and Evesham were relegated. There were level transfers for Wolverhampton and Walsall to Regional 2 Midlands North while Crewe & Nantwich and Whitchurch moved to Regional 2 North West. Joining were Berkswell & Balsall, Moseley Oak, Shipston-on-Stour, Stow-on-the-Wold, Cheltenham and Newent as the league moved further south in its reach.

Team	Ground	Capacity	City/Area	Previous season
Berkswell & Balsall	Honiley Road		Balsall Common, Warwickshire	Promoted from Counties 1 Midlands West (South) (champions)
Cheltenham	Newlands Park		Southam, Cheltenham, Gloucestershire	Level transfer from Regional 2 Severn (8th)
Hereford	Wyeside	3,200 (200 seats)	Hereford, Herefordshire	5th
Ludlow	The Linney		Ludlow, Shropshire	3rd
Malvern	Spring Lane		Malvern, Worcestershire	6th
Moseley Oak	Billesley Common	5,000 (1,300 seats)	Moseley, Birmingham, West Midlands	Level transfer from Regional 2 Midlands North (3rd)
Newent	Recreation Ground		Newent, Gloucestershire	Level transfer from Regional 2 Severn (4th)
Shipston-on-Stour	Mayo Road	600	Shipston-on-Stour, Warwickshire	Level transfer from Regional 2 South Central (9th)
Silhillians	The Memorial Ground		Solihull, West Midlands	Level transfer from Regional 2 Midlands North (10th)
Stratford-upon-Avon	Loxley Road		Stratford-upon-Avon, Warwickshire	4th
Stow-on-the-Wold	Oddington Road		Stow-on-the-Wold, Gloucestershire	Level transfer from Regional 2 South Central (4th)
Worcester Wanderers	Cummins Farm / Weston Field Pitches		Worcester, Worcestershire	7th

Locations of the 2023–24 Regional 2 Midlands West teams

=== League table ===
Regional 2 Midlands West 2023–24
	Team	Played	Won	Drawn	Lost	Points for	Points against	Points diff	Try bonus	Loss bonus	Points	Points deducted
1	Silhillians (P)	22	19	0	3	718	327	391	13	2	91	
2	Stow-on-the-Wold	22	15	1	6	595	352	243	14	3	79	
3	Newent	22	16	1	5	645	340	305	11	5	77	
4	Cheltenham	22	13	2	7	572	550	22	10	2	68	
5	Hereford	22	12	1	9	555	516	39	12	5	67	
6	Stratford-upon-Avon	22	12	0	10	592	450	142	13	5	66	
7	Moseley Oak	22	12	2	8	564	446	118	9	3	64	
8	Ludlow	22	11	1	10	465	513	−48	9	1	56	
9	Shipston-on-Stour	22	9	0	13	570	444	126	12	6	54	
10	Malvern	22	5	3	14	399	675	−276	6	2	34	
11	Worcester Wanderers (R)	22	1	1	20	359	795	−436	4	5	15	
12	Berkswell & Balsall (R)	22	1	0	21	254	880	−626	3	1	8	
If teams are level at any stage, tiebreakers are applied in the following order: 1. Number of matches won 2. Difference between points for and against 3. Total number of points for 4. Aggregate number of points scored in matches between tied teams 5. Number of matches won excluding the first match, then the second and so on until the tie is settled
Green background is the promotion place. Pink background are the relegation places Updated: 7 December 2024; Source:

== 2022–23 ==
This was the first season following the RFU Adult Competition Review with the league rebranded as Regional 2 Midlands West. The league was reduced from 14 to 12 clubs.

=== Participating teams and locations ===
Team	Ground	Capacity	City/Area	Previous season
Crewe & Nantwich	Newcastle Road		Nantwich, Cheshire	4th Midlands 2 West (North)
Droitwich	Glyn Mitchell Memorial Ground	3,000	Droitwich, Worcestershire	13th Midlands 1 West
Evesham	Lower Albert Road		Evesham, Worcestershire	2nd Midlands 2 West (South)
Hereford	Wyeside	3,200 (200 seats)	Hereford, Herefordshire	9th Midlands 1 West
Ludlow	The Linney		Ludlow, Shropshire	4th Midlands 1 West
Malvern	Spring Lane		Malvern, Worcestershire	12th Midlands 1 West
Old Halesonians	Wassell Grove		Hagley, Stourbridge, Worcestershire	11th Midlands 1 West
Stratford-upon-Avon	Loxley Road		Stratford-upon-Avon, Warwickshire	5th Midlands 1 West
Walsall	Broadway Ground	1,150 (150 stand)	Walsall, West Midlands	2nd Midlands 2 West (North)
Whitchurch	Edgeley Park		Whitchurch, Shropshire	7th Midlands 1 West
Wolverhampton	Castlecroft Road		Castlecroft, Wolverhampton, West Midlands	8th Midlands 1 West
Worcester Wanderers	Cummins Farm / Weston Field Pitches		Worcester, Worcestershire	14th Midlands 1 West

Locations of the 2022–23 Regional 2 Midlands West teams

=== League table ===
Regional 2 West Midlands 2022–23
	Team	Played	Won	Drawn	Lost	Points for	Points against	Points diff	Try bonus	Loss bonus	Points	Points deducted
1	Old Halesonians (P)	22	19	0	3	652	392	260	15	0	91	
2	Walsall	22	17	0	5	720	285	435	15	2	86	
3	Ludlow	22	17	0	5	762	307	455	14	1	83	
4	Stratford-upon-Avon	22	13	0	9	596	436	160	11	2	65	
5	Hereford	22	13	0	9	502	464	38	10	3	65	
6	Malvern	22	13	0	9	512	485	27	8	2	65	
7	Worcester Wanderers	22	11	0	11	521	571	−50	9	3	56	
8	Crewe	22	10	0	12	567	558	9	11	3	54	
9	Whitchurch	22	9	0	13	563	493	70	11	5	52	
10	Wolverhampton	22	8	0	14	422	493	−71	7	4	43	
11	Evesham (R)	22	2	0	20	354	772	−418	3	4	10	−5
12	Droitwich (R)	22	0	0	22	170	1085	−915	0	0	0	
If teams are level at any stage, tiebreakers are applied in the following order: 1. Number of matches won 2. Difference between points for and against 3. Total number of points for 4. Aggregate number of points scored in matches between tied teams 5. Number of matches won excluding the first match, then the second and so on until the tie is settled
Green background is the promotion place. Pink background are the relegation places Updated: 25 June 2023; Source: "Regional 2 West Midlands". England Rugby.

== 2021–22 ==
The teams competing in 2021–22 achieved their places in the league based on performances in 2019–20, the 'previous season' column in the table below refers to that season not 2020–21.

=== Participating teams and locations ===
Team	Ground	Capacity	City/Area	Previous season
Droitwich	Glyn Mitchell Memorial Ground	3,000	Droitwich, Worcestershire	11th
Hereford	Wyeside	3,200 (200 seats)	Hereford, Herefordshire	5th
Kenilworth	Glasshouse Lane		Kenilworth, Warwickshire	2nd
Lichfield	Cooke Fields		Lichfield, Staffordshire	3rd
Ludlow	The Linney		Ludlow, Shropshire	7th
Malvern	Spring Lane		Malvern, Worcestershire	Promoted from Midlands 2 West (South) (2nd)
Old Halesonians	Wassell Grove		Hagley, Stourbridge, Worcestershire	12th
Newbold-on-Avon	Parkfield Road		Newbold-on-Avon, Rugby, Warwickshire	6th
Stoke-on-Trent	Hartwell Lane		Barlaston, Staffordshire	8th
Stratford-upon-Avon	Loxley Road		Stratford-upon-Avon, Warwickshire	Promoted from Midlands 2 West (South) (1st)
Sutton Coldfield	Roger Smoldon Ground		Sutton Coldfield, West Midlands	10th
Whitchurch	Edgeley Park		Whitchurch, Shropshire	4th
Wolverhampton	Castlecroft Road		Castlecroft, Wolverhampton, West Midlands	Promoted from Midlands 2 West (North) (1st)
Worcester Wanderers	Cummins Farm / Weston Field Pitches		Worcester, Worcestershire	9th

Locations of the 2021–22 Midlands 1 West teams

== 2020–21 ==
On 30 October 2020 the RFU announced that due to the coronavirus pandemic a decision had been taken to cancel Adult Competitive Leagues (National League 1 and below) for the 2020/21 season meaning Midlands 1 West was not contested.

== 2019–20 ==
=== Participating teams and locations ===
Team	Ground	Capacity	City/Area	Previous season
Droitwich	Glyn Mitchell Memorial Ground	3,000	Droitwich, Worcestershire	9th
Dudley Kingswinford	Heathbrook	2,260 (260 seats)	Kingswinford, Dudley, West Midlands	Runners up (lost playoff)
Hereford	Wyeside	3,200 (200 seats)	Hereford, Herefordshire	6th
Kenilworth	Glasshouse Lane		Kenilworth, Warwickshire	Promoted from Midlands 2 West (South) (champions)
Kidderminster Carolians	Marlpool Lane		Kidderminster, Worcestershire	Promoted from Midlands 2 West (South) (playoff)
Lichfield	Cooke Fields		Lichfield, Staffordshire	Relegated from Midlands Premier (13th)
Ludlow	The Linney		Ludlow, Shropshire	Promoted from Midlands 2 West (North) (champions)
Old Halesonians	Wassell Grove		Hagley, Stourbridge, Worcestershire	8th
Newbold-on-Avon	Parkfield Road		Newbold-on-Avon, Rugby, Warwickshire	3rd
Stoke-on-Trent	Hartwell Lane		Barlaston, Staffordshire	5th
Stourbridge Lions	Stourton Park	3,500 (499 seats)	Stourbridge, West Midlands	11th
Sutton Coldfield	Roger Smoldon Ground		Sutton Coldfield, West Midlands	10th
Whitchurch	Edgeley Park		Whitchurch, Shropshire	4th
Worcester Wanderers	Cummins Farm / Weston Field Pitches		Worcester, Worcestershire	7th

Locations of the 2019–20 Midlands 1 West teams

== 2018–19 ==
=== Participating teams and locations ===
Team	Ground	Capacity	City/Area	Previous season
Bromsgrove	Finstall Park		Bromsgrove, Worcestershire	3rd
Droitwich	Glyn Mitchell Memorial Ground	3,000	Droitwich, Worcestershire	Promoted from Midlands 2 West (South) (champions)
Dudley Kingswinford	Heathbrook	2,260 (260 seats)	Kingswinford, Dudley, West Midlands	Runners up (lost playoff)
Hereford	Wyeside	3,200 (200 seats)	Hereford, Herefordshire	6th
Longton	Trentham Fields		Longton, Stoke-on-Trent, Staffordshire	Relegated from Midlands Premier (13th)
Malvern	Spring Lane		Malvern, Worcestershire	Promoted from Midlands 2 West (South) (runners up)
Moseley Oak	Billesley Common	5,000 (1,300 seats)	Moseley, Birmingham, West Midlands	7th
Old Halesonians	Wassell Grove		Hagley, Stourbridge, Worcestershire	Relegated from Midlands Premier (14th)
Newbold-on-Avon	Parkfield Road		Newbold-on-Avon, Rugby, Warwickshire	Relegated from Midlands Premier (12th)
Stoke-on-Trent	Hartwell Lane		Barlaston, Staffordshire	4th
Stourbridge Lions	Stourton Park	3,500 (499 seats)	Stourbridge, West Midlands	8th
Sutton Coldfield	Roger Smoldon Ground		Sutton Coldfield, West Midlands	10th
Whitchurch	Edgeley Park		Whitchurch, Shropshire	Promoted from Midlands 2 West (North) (champions)
Worcester Wanderers	Cummins Farm / Weston Field Pitches		Worcester, Worcestershire	9th

Locations of the 2018–19 Midlands 1 West teams

== 2017–18 ==
Team	Ground	Capacity	City/Area	Previous season
Bromsgrove	Finstall Park		Bromsgrove, Worcestershire	Relegated from National League 3 South West (14th)
Burton	Peel Croft	5,500 (600 seats)	Burton, Staffordshire	3rd
Camp Hill	The Shrine		Shirley, Solihull, West Midlands	Promoted from Midlands 2 West (North) (playoff)
Dudley Kingswinford	Heathbrook	2,260 (260 seats)	Kingswinford, Dudley, West Midlands	4th
Hereford	Wyeside	3,200 (200 seats)	Hereford, Herefordshire	9th
Lutterworth	Ashby Lane		Lutterworth, Leicestershire	Level transfer from Midlands 1 East (4th)
Melbourne	Cockshut Lane	2,000	Melbourne, Derbyshire	Promoted from Midlands 2 East (North) (champions)
Moseley Oak	Billesley Common	5,000 (1,300 seats)	Moseley, Birmingham, West Midlands	6th
Rugby Lions	Webb Ellis Road	4,000 (200 seats)	Rugby, Warwickshire	Promoted from Midlands 2 West (South) (champions)
Stoke-on-Trent	Hartwell Lane		Barlaston, Staffordshire	10th
Stourbridge Lions	Stourton Park	3,500 (499 seats)	Stourbridge, West Midlands	Promoted from Midlands 2 West (North) (champions)
Sutton Coldfield	Roger Smoldon Ground		Sutton Coldfield, West Midlands	7th
Wolverhampton	Castlecroft Road		Castlecroft, Wolverhampton, West Midlands	11th
Worcester Wanderers	Cummins Farm / Weston Field Pitches		Worcester, Worcestershire	8th

Locations of the 2017–18 Midlands 1 West teams

== 2016–17 ==
- Bournville
- Burton
- Crewe & Nantwich
- Dudley Kingswinford
- Hereford
- Kenilworth
- Moseley Oak (promoted from Midlands 2 West (North))
- Newport (Salop) (relegated from National League 3 Midlands)
- Stoke-on-Trent
- Stratford upon Avon
- Sutton Coldfield (relegated from National League 3 Midlands)
- Whitchurch
- Wolverhampton (promoted from Midlands 2 West (North))
- Worcester Wanderers

== 2015–16 ==
- Bournville (relegated from National League 3 Midlands)
- Bridgnorth (promoted from Midlands 2 West (North))
- Burton (relegated from National League 3 Midlands)
- Crewe & Nantwich
- Dudley Kingswinford (relegated from National League 3 Midlands)
- Hereford
- Kenilworth
- Leek
- Silhillians
- Stoke-on-Trent
- Stratford upon Avon
- Walsall
- Whitchurch
- Worcester Wanderers

== 2014–15 ==
- Barkers Butts
- Berkswell & Balsall
- Crewe and Nantwich (promoted from Midlands 2 West (North))
- Earlsdon (promoted from Midlands 2 West (South))
- Hereford
- Kenilworth
- Leek (promoted from Midlands 2 West (North))
- Newport (Salop) RFC (relegated from National League 3 Midlands)
- Silhillians
- Stoke-on-Trent
- Stratford Upon Avon
- Walsall
- Whitchurch
- Worcester Wanderers (relegated from National League 3 South West)

== 2013–14 ==
- Barkers Butts
- Berkswell & Balsall
- Burton
- Hereford
- Kenilworth (promoted from Midlands 2 West (South))
- Lichfield
- Malvern (relegated from National League 3 South West)
- Market Bosworth (transferred from Midlands 1 East)
- Old Laurentians
- Silhillians (promoted from Midlands 2 West (North))
- Stoke-on-Trent
- Stratford Upon Avon
- Walsall
- Whitchurch

== 2012–13 ==
- Barkers Butts
- Berkswell & Balsall
- Burton
- Camp Hill
- Hereford (relegated from National League 3 Midlands)
- Lichfield
- Ludlow
- Northwich
- Old Halesonians
- Stoke-on-Trent (promoted from Midlands 2 West (North)
- Stratford Upon Avon
- Walsall
- Whitchurch
- Worcester Wanderers

== 2011–12 ==
- Bedworth
- Bournville
- Burton (relegated from National League 3 Midlands)
- Camp Hill
- Dunlop
- Kenilworth (relegated from National League 3 Midlands)
- Lichfield
- Ludlow
- Old Halesonians RFC
- Stratford Upon Avon
- Sutton Coldfield
- Walsall
- Whitchurch
- Worcester Wanderers

== 2010–11 ==
- Banbury
- Bournville
- Camp Hill
- Dudley Kingswinford
- Leamington
- Lichfield
- Nuneaton Old Edwardians
- Old Halesonians
- Old Laurentians
- Stratford Upon Avon
- Sutton Coldfield
- Walsall
- Whitchurch
- Worcester Wanderers

== Original teams ==
When league rugby began in 1987 this division (known as Midlands 2 West) contained the following teams:

- Bromsgrove
- Burton
- Dixonians
- Dudley Kingswinford
- Evesham
- Hereford
- Leamington
- Newbold-on-Avon
- Sutton Coldfield
- Tamworth
- Worcester

== Regional 2 West Midlands honours ==
=== Midlands 2 West (1987–1992) ===
The original Midlands 2 West (along with its counterpart Midlands 2 East) was a tier 6 league with promotion to Midlands Premier and relegation to either North Midlands 1 or Staffordshire/Warwickshire.

Midlands 2 West
Season	No of teams	Champions	Runners–up	Relegated teams	Reference
1987–88	11	Hereford	Dixonians	Evesham, Leamington	
1988–89	11	Sutton Coldfield	Bedworth	Worcester, Tamworth	
1989–90	11	Camp Hill	Wolverhampton	Dixonians	
1990–91	11	Leamington	Keresley	Dudley Kingswinford, Old Yardleians	
1991–92	11	Bedworth	Wolverhampton	Bromsgrove, Sutton Coldfield, Newbold-on-Avon (Note: All relegated to new Midlands West 1 division.)	
Green backgrounds are the promotion places.

=== Midlands 2 (1992–1993) ===
Restructuring of the Midlands leagues ahead of the 1992–93 season saw Midlands 2 West and Midlands 2 East combined in a single tier 6 division known as Midlands 2. Promotion continued to Midlands 1 while relegation was now to the newly introduced Midlands West 1 (Note: Not to be confused with Midlands 1 West, Midlands West 1 is currently split into two regional leagues - Midlands 2 West (North) and Midlands 2 West (South).).

Midlands 2
Season	No of teams	Champions	Runners–up	Relegated teams	Reference
1992–93	12	Burton	Worcester	Biggleswade, Nottingham Moderns	
Green backgrounds are the promotion places.

=== Midlands 2 (1993–1996) ===
The top six teams from Midlands 1 and the top six from North 1 were combined to create National 5 North, meaning that Midlands 2 dropped to become a tier 7 league. Promotion and relegation continued to Midlands Premier and Midlands West 1 (Note: Midlands West 1 is currently split into two regional leagues - Midlands 2 West (North) and Midlands 2 West (South).).

Midlands 2
Season	No of teams	Champions	Runners–up	Relegated teams	Reference
1993–94	13	Whitchurch	Stafford	Vipers	
1994–95	13	Leighton Buzzard	Broadstreet	Willenhall, Newark, Peterborough	
1995–96	13	Scunthorpe	Hinckley (Note: Due to widespread restructuring, 3rd and 4th place Derby and Stockwood Park were also promoted.)	No relegation (Note: Nationwide league restructuring meant that there was no relegation this season.)	
Green backgrounds are the promotion places.

=== Midlands 2 (1996–2000) ===
At the end of the 1995–96 season National 5 North was discontinued and Midlands 2 returned to being a tier 6 league. Promotion and relegation continued to Midlands Premier and Midlands West 1 (Note: Midlands West 1 is currently split into two regional leagues - Midlands 2 West (North) and Midlands 2 West (South).).

Midlands 2
Season	No of teams	Champions	Runners–up	Relegated teams	Reference
1996–97	17	Banbury	Kenilworth	Bedworth, Matlock, Long Buckby, Keresley	
1997–98	17	Bedford Athletic	Dudley Kingswinford	Paviors	
1998–99	17	Longton	Newbold-on-Avon	Leamington, Towcestrians, Stafford	
1999–00	17	Malvern (Note: Due to the restructuring of Midlands 2 into two regional divisions champions Malvern were not promoted, instead being transferred to the new Midlands 2 West division.)	Bromsgrove (Note: Midlands 2 was due to be restructured into two regional divisions for the following season. Malvern, Bromsgrove, Luctonians, Old Laurentians, Newport (Salop), Sutton Coldfield, Derby and Wolverhampton would transfer into Midlands 2 West, while Wellingborough, Kettering, Ampthill, Mansfield, Huntingdon & District, Lincoln, Nottingham Moderns, Leighton Buzzard and Stockwood Park would go into Midlands 2 East.)	No relegation (Note: Due to the restructuring of Midlands 2 into two regional divisions there was no relegation.)	
Green backgrounds are the promotion places.

=== Midlands 2 West (2000–2009) ===
Restructuring ahead of the 2000–01 season saw Midlands 2 split back into two tier 6 regional leagues – Midlands 2 West and Midlands 2 East. Promotion continued to Midlands 1 while relegation was now to either Midlands 3 West (North) or Midlands 3 West (South) (both formerly part of Midlands West 1).

Midlands 2 West
Season	No of teams	Champions	Runners–up	Relegated teams	Reference
2000–01	12	Malvern	Luctonians	Lichfield, Belgrave, Moseley Oak	
2001–02	12	Bromsgrove	Old Laurentians	Newport, Stoke-on-Trent, Shrewsbury	
2002–03	12	Old Laurentians	Derby	Lordswood Dixonians, Wolverhampton, Shrewsbury	
2003–04	12	Bromsgrove	Derby	Bedworth, Hereford, Barkers Butts	
2004–05	12	Burton	Malvern	Nuneaton Old Edwardians, Old Coventrians, Aston Old Edwardians	
2005–06	12	Broadstreet	Kenilworth	Old Laurentians, Leamington, Stoke-on-Trent	
2006–07	12	Kenilworth	Newport	Stafford, Camp Hill, Bridgnorth	
2007–08	12	Malvern	Hereford	Newbold-on-Avon, Barkers Butts, Lichfield	
2008–09	12	Bromsgrove	Hereford	No relegation (Note: No relegation due to nationwide league restructure.)	
Green backgrounds are promotion places.

=== Midlands 1 West (2009–2022) ===
League restructuring by the RFU meant that Midlands 2 West and Midlands 2 East were renamed as Midlands 1 West and Midlands 1 East, with both leagues remaining at tier 6. Promotion was now to National League 3 Midlands (Note: National League 3 Midlands is currently known as Midlands Premier.) (formerly Midlands 1) and relegation to either Midlands 2 West (North) or Midlands 2 West (South) (Note: Prior to the 2009–10 season Midlands 2 West (North) or Midlands 2 West (South) were both known as Midlands 3 West (North) and Midlands 3 West (South).).

Midlands 1 West
Season	No of teams	Champions	Runners–up	Relegated teams	Reference
2009–10	13	Burton	Bournville	Cheltenham North, Stoke-on-Trent	
2010–11	14	Dudley Kingswinford	Sutton Coldfield	Leamington, Banbury, Old Laurentians	
2011–12	14	Sutton Coldfield	Bournville	Dunlop, Bedworth, Kenilworth	
2012–13	14	Old Halesonians	Worcester Wanderers	Camphill, Northwich, Ludlow	
2013–14	14	Lichfield	Burton	Market Bosworth, Malvern, Old Laurentians	
2014–15	14	Newport (Salop)	Worcester Wanderers	Berkswell & Balsall, Earlsdon, Barkers Butts	
2015–16	14	Bridgnorth	Bournville	Walsall, Silhillians, Leek	
2016–17	14	Newport (Salop)	Bournville	Kenilworth, Crewe & Nantwich, Whitchurch	
2017–18	14	Burton	Dudley Kingswinford	Wolverhampton, Camp Hill, Melbourne	
2018–19	14	Bromsgrove	Dudley Kingswinford	Moseley Oak, Malvern, Longton	
2019–20	14	Dudley Kingswinford	Kenilworth	Kidderminster Carolians, Stourbridge Lions	
2020–21	14	Cancelled due to the COVID-19 pandemic in the United Kingdom.			
Green backgrounds are promotion places.

=== Regional 2 Midlands West (2022–present) ===
Regional 2 Midlands West
Season	No of teams	Champions	Runners–up	Relegated teams	Reference
2022–23	12	Old Halesonians	Walsall	Evesham and Droitwich	
2023–24	12	Silhillians	Stow-on-the-Wold	Worcester Wanderers and Berkswell & Balsall	
2024–25	12	Newent	Moseley Oak	Ledbury and Whitchurch	

== Promotion play-offs ==
From 2000–01 until 2018–19 there has been a play-off between the runners-up of Midlands 1 East and Midlands 1 West for the third and final promotion place to National League 3 Midlands. The team with the superior league record has home advantage in the tie. At the end of the 2018–19 season the Midlands 1 East teams have been the most successful with eleven wins to the Midlands 1 West teams eight; and the home team has won promotion on thirteen occasions compared to the away teams six.

Midlands 1 East v Midlands 1 West promotion play-off results
Season	Home team	Score	Away team	Venue	Attendance
2000–01	Luctonians (W)	20–13	Wellingborough (E)	Mortimer Park, Kingsland, Herefordshire	
2001–02	Old Laurentians (W)	10–32	Spalding (E)	Fenley Field, Rugby, Warwickshire	
2002–03	Luton (E)	16–11	Derby (W)	Newlands Road, Luton, Bedfordshire	
2003–04	Derby (W)	29–12	Hinckley (E)	Haslams Lane, Derby, Derbyshire	
2004–05	Market Bosworth (E)	40–7	Malvern (W)	Cadeby Lane, Market Bosworth, Warwickshire	
2005–06	Peterborough (E)	23–21	Kenilworth (W)	Fortress Fengate, Peterborough, Cambridgeshire	1,000
2006–07	Newport (Salop) (W)	20–5	Matlock (E)	The Old Showground, Newport, Shropshire	500
2007–08	Hereford (W)	13–43	Hinckley (E)	Wyeside, Hereford, Herefordshire	
2008–09	Scunthorpe (E)	9–16	Hereford (W)	Heslam Park, Scunthorpe, Lincolnshire	
2009–10	Bournville (W)	AWO (Note: Old Northamptonians were promoted by default as Bournville were unable to field a front row for the 2009-10 play-off game.)	Old Northamptonians (E)	Rowheath, Bournville, Birmingham, West Midlands	N/A
2010–11	Sutton Coldfield (W)	27–33	Mansfield (E)	Roger Smoldon Ground, Sutton Coldfield, West Midlands	
2011–12	Bournville (W)	42–11	Paviors (E)	Bournbrook, Edgbaston, Birmingham, West Midlands	
2012–13	Worcester Wanderers (W)	27–17 (aet)	Ilkeston (E)	Weston's Field, Worcester, Worcestershire	
2013–14	Burton (W)	24–20	Derby (E)	Peel Croft, Burton, Staffordshire	1,000
2014–15	Old Northamptonians (E)	20–5	Worcester Wanderers (W)	Sir Humphrey Cripps Pavilion, Northampton, Northamptonshire	
2015–16	Derby (E)	28–23	Bournville (W)	Haslams Lane, Derby, Derbyshire	200
2016–17	Kettering (E)	19–55	Bournville (W)	Waverley Road, Kettering, Northamptonshire	
2017–18	Dudley Kingswinford (W)	33–37	Syston (E)	Heathbrook, Swindon Road, Wall Heath, Kingswinford	
2018–19	Paviors (E)	33–30	Dudley Kingswinford (W)	The Ron Rossin Ground, Nottingham, Nottinghamshire	
2019–20	Cancelled due to COVID-19 pandemic in the United Kingdom. Best ranked runner up – Oundle (E) – promoted instead.				
Green background is the promoted team. E = Midlands 1 East (formerly Midlands 2 East) and W = Midlands 1 West (formerly Midlands 2 West)

== Number of league titles ==
- Burton (4) (Note: One of Burton's titles was when league was single division known as Midlands 2.)
- Bromsgrove (4)
- Malvern (3) (Note: One of Malvern's titles was when league was single division known as Midlands 2.)
- Dudley Kingswinford (2)
- Lichfield (2)
- Newport (Salop) (2)
- Sutton Coldfield (2)
- Banbury (1) (Note: Banbury's title was when league was single division known as Midlands 2.)
- Bedford Athletic (1) (Note: Bedford Athletic's title was when league was single division known as Midlands 2.)
- Bedworth (1)
- Bridgnorth (1)
- Broadstreet (1)
- Camp Hill (1)
- Hereford (1)
- Kenilworth (1)
- Leamington (1)
- Leighton Buzzard (1) (Note: Leighton Buzzard's title was when league was single division known as Midlands 2.)
- Longton (1) (Note: Longton's title was when league was single division known as Midlands 2.)
- Newent (1)
- Old Halesonians (1)
- Old Laurentians (1)
- Scunthorpe (1) (Note: Scunthorpe's title was when league was single division known as Midlands 2.)
- Silhillians (1)
- Whitchurch (1) (Note: Whitchurch's title was when league was single division known as Midlands 2.)

== See also ==
- Midlands RFU
- North Midlands RFU
- Staffordshire RU
- Warwickshire RFU
- English rugby union system
- Rugby union in England
