= Leighton Buzzard R.F.C. =

English rugby union club, based in Leighton Buzzard, Bedfordshire

(England) Leighton Buzzard
- Full name: Leighton Buzzard R.F.C.
- Union: East Midlands RFU
- Founded: 1934; 92 years ago
- Location: Leighton Buzzard, Bedfordshire, England
- Ground(s): Wright's Meadow, Leighton Road, Stanbridge, LU7 9HR
- Chairman: (England) Lee Beaumont
- Coach: (England) Phil Llewellyn
- Captain: (England) James Brett
- League: Midlands Counties 1 East (South)
- 2025–26: 2nd - Midlands Counties 2 East (South)
1st kit	2nd kit

Official website
- www.buzzardrugby.co.uk

Leighton Buzzard R.F.C is a Rugby Union club based in the English town of Leighton Buzzard in the county of Bedfordshire. They play at Wright's Meadow on Leighton Road, in the Parish of Stanbridge. In 2025-26 the 1st XV will play in Midlands Counties 2 East (South) - a league at the 8th tier of the English rugby union system and based in the RFU Midlands Division.

== History ==
=== Early years ===
The club was founded in 1934 with the enthusiastic support of the town's Cedars Grammar School with which it has always maintained a close support. The club flourished during those early years, playing its home matches at the Cricket Club's Bell Close headquarters, but like many others, was disbanded with the outbreak of World War II. Many of the founder members did not return from the hostilities and probably in consequence the club was not reformed until mid-way through season 1948–49. Several successful seasons followed, with the club supported by local schools and locally based service personnel, but fell into decline and was disbanded at the end of the 1955–56 season. Rugby during this immediate post-war period was played at the Capshill Meadow on the Hockliffe Road which is just big enough for one pitch.

The modern club traces its origins to a reorganization undertaken before the 1958–59 season, initiated by 19-year-old Howard Ansdell. Local businessman Geoff Wright played a role in the development of the club's infrastructure, including the construction of its first clubhouse in 1962 and the acquisition of the Capshill Meadow ground in 1965. Following the sale of that ground in 1973, the proceeds were used to develop the club's facilities.

The club subsequently moved to Stanbridge Road during a period of expansion in the town. The growth in the local population increased the pool of available players and enabled the club to arrange stronger fixtures for its Senior XV. Following the conversion of Cedars Grammar School to a comprehensive school, rugby union remained the school's principal winter sport, and the club continued to draw many of its players from the school. Throughout the 1970s, 1980s, and 1990s, former Cedars pupils were regularly represented across the club's six teams.

=== The slow build (1960s and 1970s) ===
Leighton Buzzard R.F.C. drew a consistent number of players from particularly the Cedars and the Vandyke Schools, which contributed growth in the 1970s. During this time the club built a strong bond with the club from Leighton Buzzard's French twin town Coulommiers in the Seine-et-Marne department in the Île-de-France region. On an occasion the club also stepped in to host top Romanian club CSA Steaua București when bad weather had forced the cancellation of one of their tour matches. At that time Romanian rugby was competing at a level comparable to Five Nations Championship, they scored reasonably regular victories over France, Wales and Scotland.

=== Years of success (1980–1995) ===
The club's golden period could be traced from the early- to mid-80s through to the mid-90s. Prior to the RFU's implementation of a national league structure in 1987, the measure of success for junior clubs were the cup competitions of the RFU constituent county bodies. Winning the County Cup enabled a club to gain entry to the following season's National Knockout Cup and the chance to have a tilt at one of the big clubs. In Leighton Buzzard's case this came in the shape of the East Midlands Cup for clubs based in Bedfordshire and Northants. In 1985–86, Paul Whiting became the first Buzzards skipper to lift the Cup when Peterborough were beaten 16-6 in the final. The draw for the following season's National Cup, then called the John Player Cup, saw them paired with Birmingham, at the time a club on the cusp of first class status who were later to become Birmingham & Solihull R.F.C. Led by David Yirrell, Buzzards produced the upset of the round winning 20–11. Buzzards fell at the next hurdle to Lichfield but with confidence brimming the season culminated with the retention of the East Midlands Cup when Northampton Trinity were beaten 18-8 at Franklin's Gardens.

The following season, the inaugural season of league rugby in England, saw Buzzards placed in Midlands Division 2 (East). They also made their second appearance in the John Player Cup as a result of their County Cup win. Again they conquered higher ranked opposition in the first round when Derby, then of National Division 4 (North), were beaten 10–7 in a close encounter at Leighton Road (the name 'Wright's Meadow' was still to be coined). The second round draw paired them with first class opposition in the form of nearby Bedford Blues, again at home. Led by John Orwin who was to captain England later that season, and also including former and future Buzzard stalwarts in Pete Ellam and John Davidson, Bedford had to work hard to subdue a spirited Buzzards effort. Buzzards conceded just one try in a 24–6 defeat in front of probably the largest crowd to assemble at the ground. Later that season their attempt to land a hat-trick of East Midlands Cup wins was dashed at the last when they fell to Stockwood Park in the final. A fifth place in their first league campaign was a disappointing return for a season that had started with such promise. However this disappointment was tempered slightly by the RFU's decision to expand the entry to the following season's National Cup, now to be called the Pilkington Cup, meaning that Leighton would be included as East Midlands Cup Runners-Up.

In 1988–89 with John Fraser now installed as skipper, the second season of league rugby was a successful one as they finished as champions of Midlands 2 (East) to bring about what became a five-season stay in Midlands Division 1 (now named Regional 1 Midlands). At the time this was the fifth tier of the National League structure. Their National Cup heroics didn't quite reach their previous heights as they made an 18–12 first round exit to Hereford.

In 1993–94 the club suffered their first relegation dropping back into what was now Midlands Division 2 (the East/West split having been discarded for 1994–95). In terms of silverware the Club now embarked on probably its most successful season. Under the captaincy of Ian Smith, the league title was secured with a win in the last-day winner-takes-all clash against Broadstreet at Wright's Meadow that ensured an immediate return to Midlands Division 1. Not only was there the league success but the Bedfordshire Cup was regained and the East Midlands Cup won for a third (and to date last) time with local rivals Stockwood Park vanquished in both finals.

=== 60th anniversary and beyond ===
There followed the club's 60th anniversary season which began with celebration matches against Aylesbury, who had been the club's first opponents in 1934, and a side representing top division club Wasps. The East Midlands Cup win of the previous April had also given them another Pilkington Cup excursion. Again they were paired with Birmingham & Solihull. Though this time they had home advantage, history was not to be repeated and their campaign faltered at the first hurdle as they went down 29–11. By now, with the league system having taken deep root very quickly, a club's position within the league structure was now seen as all important with the Pilkington Cup now seen as a diversion, albeit a pleasant one with some kudos if early rounds could be successfully negotiated. Buzzards achieved their primary aim in their first season back in Midlands 1 by consolidating its place with a 10th-place finish in the 13-team table.

The club's most successful league campaign came in the 1997–98 when Carl Siddon led them to a mid-table finish in Midlands Division 1. The following season, however, saw a sharp decline in playing strength and performance and inevitably relegation followed. The club has not been at Level 5 since.

During 2024-2025 the club fielded two adult senior sides plus a Colts XV. In recent times the club also fielded three additional senior sides, a Veterans (over 35's) XV. The club relies heavily on developing players from within its own ranks and is very proud of its long-established Mini/Junior section which currently boasts a membership of approximately 200 children aged between 5 and 17 years. Never having had a large benefactor may have meant that Buzzard's senior league position has slipped, but it has meant that the club still belongs to the town and the members and retains the "club feel". The 1st XV starting line up and subs for the side's last home League match of the successful 2013–14 season contained 11 players whose fathers had also played for the club.

Signs that their star might be in the ascendant once more came in 2006–07 when the Colts XV swept the board winning the East Midlands League and Cup competitions along with the Bedfordshire Cup. The side was captained by Ryan Fraser emulating his father John in lifting silverware in the name of LBRFC. A majority of those Colts players filtered into the senior setup and kept the club at a good standard.

In March 2020 the club won the Midlands Final of the RFU Intermediate Cup beating Malvern 30-16 at Wright's Meadow despite being reduced to 14 men early in the match. The draw for the national semi-finals saw them handed a home tie against Halifax-based Old Brodleians who had won the Northern Division final. Sadly the match was never played owing to the COVID-19 pandemic which saw the eventual cancellation of the competition. Thus Buzzards, Brodleians and the South West and London Division semi-finalists Wellington and Old Colfeians were left stranded, one step away from a Twickenham final.

With playing resources having dwindled alarmingly the club took the decision to drop out of the RFU League structure midway through the 2023-24 season during which they had been completing in London and South East Regional 2 Thames, a division at Level 6 of the league pyramid. Having recovered to a degree in time for the 2024-2025 season, the club was re-admitted to the League but at Level 9, and back in the Midlands Division in Counties 3 East South. The league title and promotion to Level 8 was secured with two matches remaining. The club also secured the Bedfordshire Shield beating Dunstablians 32-12.

In 2025-26 the club won a second successive promotion when finishing 2nd in Midlands Counties 2 East (South) thus enabling their return to Level 7 of the RFU league structure. During this season, skipper James Brett scored 386 1st XV points. A new club record.

Founded in 1934, LBRFC has developed into a major sporting venue within the local community. The club has continued to invest in its facilities and, regularly considers further improvements to support sporting activities and associated social functions.

== Honours ==
1st XV:

- East Midlands Cup winners (3): 1985–86, 1986–87, 1994–95
- Midlands 2 champions: 1988–89, (Note: 1988–89 title was won when league was known as Midlands 2 East) 1994−95. (Note: 1994−95 title was won when league was single division known as Midlands 2.)
- Midlands 3 East (north v south) promotion playoff winners: 2007–08
- Midlands 2 East (South) champions (2): 2013–14, 2019–20
- Midlands Counties 3 East (South) champions: 2024-25
- RFU Midlands Intermediate Cup Winners: 2019–20
- Bedfordshire Shield winners: 2024-25
- Les Carr Shield winners: 2025-2026

2nd XV:

- East Midlands Merit Table "Banana Bread League" Champions: 2019–20

4th XV:

- East Midlands Merit Table - "Waggledance League" Champions: 2011–12

Colts:

- East Midlands Referees Cup (Colts County Cup) winners: 2006−07
- East Midlands Colts League champions: 2006−07

Under 17's:

- RFU Midlands Plate Winners: 2008−09
- RFU National Plate Winners: 2008−09

== Notable players ==
The following players all had top level experience either before or after representing Leighton Buzzard.

Alan Doherty was based at nearby R.A.F. Stanbridge when he turned out for the club on a number of occasions. After returning to his native Ireland he played for Old Wesley R.F.C. in Dublin. On 7 September 1974 he earned an international cap when he came on as a replacement for the legendary Mike Gibson in the IRFU Centenary celebration international against the President's XV. The match was drawn 18-18.

Stuart Maxwell joined following a stint with Bedford having played previously for New Brighton and Richmond. Brother of Andy, who won 7 England caps between 1975 and 1978, Stuart notched up some notable achievements of his own. In 1972 he scored two tries for the North-West Counties in their historic 16–14 win over New Zealand at Workington, the first time an English regional side had beaten the All Blacks. In 1975 having moved on to Bedford, he was a member of the Southern Counties XV that took on Australia during the latter's 1975−76 UK tour. Here he notched another try against international opposition. Maxwell was also a Sevens exponent having been a member of the Richmond side that won the Middlesex Sevens in 1974 and 1975.

John Surguy joined the club having completed two spells at Northampton Saints. Having been a prolific points scorer for Bletchley either side of his first spell at Franklins Gardens, Surguy had lived in Leighton Buzzard throughout and his town club was grateful he eventually made his way there for the 1984-85 season. He featured prominently in the East Midlands Cup wins of 1986 and 1987 and also represented East Midlands in the Mobbs Memorial Match against the Barbarians whilst at Northampton.

Chris Gibbons, though never leaving the Leighton Buzzard club did score the achievement of representing East Midlands on more than one occasion in the annual Mobbs Memorial Match against the Barbarians. At the time it was extremely rare for a player outside Northampton Saints and Bedford to be invited into the East Midlands side for the match, especially if that player was plying his trade at a junior club. Gibbons was one of the very few to buck the trend.

Pete Ellam spent three seasons with Bedford making 67 1st XV appearances in which he scored 10 tries and a penalty. He eventually returned to Buzzards and was 1st XV captain for 1991–92 season.

John Davidson arrived from Bedford in 1988−89 for the season following the Buzzards v. Bedford John Player Cup clash. Prior to joining Bedford, Davidson had been a stalwart with Moseley for whom he played in the 1982 John Player Cup Final at Twickenham when they shared the trophy with Gloucester following a 12–12 draw after extra time. Davidson also represented England 'B'.

George Messum represented England Students whilst studying at Loughborough University. He also played for Northampton Saints and Bedford before winning a Blue for Oxford University in the 2014 Varsity Match when the Dark Blues scored their record win (43−6) and in doing so notched a fifth consecutive win for the first time in the fixture. He was elected OURFC captain for the 2015−16 season but was prevented from taking part in Oxford's record sixth consecutive Varsity Match victory owing to amended eligibility rules with relation to degree courses. He returned to win another Blue in the 2019 match and finally got to skipper Oxford to victory in the 2021 Varsity match played at Welford Road, Leicester. He played his club rugby for Old Elthamians who during his time there were in National Division 1, tier 3 of the English League setup.

Neil Wise Having moved to Luxembourg with work in the mid-'90s, Wise represented the Luxembourg national side on 20 occasions between 1998 and 2006 scoring 2 tries. He made his debut against Germany, with his last cap coming against Norway. His appearance tally included a number of Rugby World Cup qualifiers.

Junior Level representation

Bert Yirrell, a recent 1st XV skipper represented England at Under-16 level when a member of the LBRFC Junior section.

Matthew Barnett-Vincent joined the club as a 16-year-old England age group international hooker and made several appearances for the 1st XV splitting his time with Bedford Blues who he made his 1st team debut against Bedfordshire aged 17 on Boxing Day 1994. Matthew played age group international (up to U21) and club rugby at Bedford for the next few seasons. He is currently involved in coaching junior players at Buckingham RUFC.

Henry Peck was selected for England Schools whilst at the club. He now plays for Cambridge in National Division 1, the third tier of the RFU league structure.
