= English Colts Club Knockout Cup =

The English Clubs Knockout Cup or The National Colts Cup is a Nationwide competition for English Rugby union Clubs Colts (under age 19) teams. The competition is a straight knock-out competition that is organised by the East Midlands Rugby Union. The prestigious competition has always had a wide range of grassroots clubs up to Premiership academy teams competing for the top prize.

The Competition is firstly set on a Regional level, with the four national districts being split into 8 Regions. From each region there will be 4 qualifiers to go onto the National Stages of the Cup competition. A plate competition was introduced to run alongside the main Cup competition for all sides knocked out in the Regional stages. In 2009/10 the Cup Competition is celebrating its thirteenth year of existence.

== Latest update 2014/15 ==
Final played 4 May 2015 at Bedford RFU

Tonbridge Juddians 43 Wolverhampton 17

Plate Final

Havant v Wharfedale

Wharfedale won narrowly

Hornets 12 Bedford Blues 55

== 2007/2008 Competition ==
=== Cup Competition ===
==== Final: 5 May 2008 (Bank Holiday Monday) ====
Home				Away
Bedford Blues	33	v	16	Nuneaton

=== Plate Competition ===
==== Final: 5 May 2008 (Bank Holiday Monday) ====
Home				Away
Bishops Stortford	16	v	46	Newbury

== Previous season's roundup ==
2007/2008 = 2007 - 2008 English Colts Club Knockout Cup

2006/2007 = 2006 - 2007 English Colts Club Knockout Cup

== Past winners ==
=== Cup winners ===
1997/1998 Moseley 8 v 3 Leeds

1998/1999 London 36 v 0 Leeds

1999/2000 Bath 29 v 24 Leicester

2000/2001 Gloucester 23 v 10 Bath

2001/2002 Bath 29 v 19 Bristol

2002/2003 London 31 v 18 Worcester

2003/2004 Bedford 7 v 25 Leeds

2004/2005 Moseley 3 v 24 Harlequins

2005/2006 Bishops Stortford 32 v 6 Old Northamptonians

2006/2007 Bedford Blues 30 v 5 Redruth R.F.C.

2007/2008 Bedford Blues 33 v 16 Nuneaton R.F.C.

2008/2009 Hinckley RFC 22 v 5 Old Albanians

2009/2010 Bedford Blues 55 v 12 Hornets

2010/2011 Bedford Blues 38 v 10 Redingensians

2011/2012 Bedford Blues 31 v 15 Ivybridge

2012/2013 Bishops Stortford 24 v 7 Worcester Wanderers

2013/2014 Thanet Wanderers 50 v 19 Old Elthamians

2014/2015 Tonbridge Juddians 43 v 17 Wolverhampton

=== Plate winners ===
1999/2000 Preston Grasshoppers 40 v 14 Basingstoke

2000/2001 Bristol 54 v 0 Leicester Lions

2001/2002 Gloucester 14 v 0 Bedford Blues

2002/2003 Cambridge 17 v 10 Preston Grasshoppers

2003/2004 Devonport Services 16 v 14 London Scottish

2004/2005 Northampton Old Scouts RFC 7 v 38 Bishop Stortford

2005/2006 Rochford Hundred 3 v 29 Worcester Wanderers

2006/2007 Bury St Edmunds 18 v 14 Weston-super-Mare R.F.C

2007/2008 Newbury 46 v 16 Bishop Stortford

2008/2009 Bedford Blues 52 v 5 Burton

2008/2009 Richmond RFC 20 v 11 Northampton Old Scouts

2010/2011 Bishop's Stortford 41 v 8 Devonport Services

2011/2012 Westcombe Park RFC 27 v 13 Old Brodleians

2012/2013 Westcombe Park RFC Winners

2013/2014 Ivybridge 15 v 14 Market Harborough

2014/2015 Wharfdale RFC 23 v 21 Havant RFC

== Success records ==
Pos	Team	Cup Wins	Cup Runners Up	Plate Wins	Plate Runners Up	Total Finals
1	Bedford Blues	5	1	1	1	4
2	Bath	2	1			3
3	London Irish	2				2
4	Leeds Tykes	1	2			3
5	Moseley	1	1			2
6	Bishop Stortford	2		1	1	4
	Gloucester	1		1		2
7	NEC Harlequins	1				1
	Hinckley RFC	1				1
	Tonbridge Juddians RFC	1				1
8	Bristol		1	1		2
	Ivybridge		1	1		2
	Worcester Wanderers		1	1		2
9	Leicester Tigers		1			1
	Old Northamptonians		1			1
	Redruth R.F.C.		1			1
	Nuneaton R.F.C.		1			1
10	Preston Grasshoppers			1	1	2
11	Bury St Edmunds			1		1
	Cambridge			1		1
	Devonport Services			1		1
	Newbury			1		1
12	Burton R.F.C				1	1
	Basingstoke				1	1
	Leicester Lions				1	1
	London Scottish				1	1
	Northampton Old Scouts RFC				1	1
	Rochford Hundred				1	1
	Weston-super-Mare RFC				1	1
	Hornets RFC		1			1

== Sources ==
- East Midlands Rugby Union
