= RFU Intermediate Cup =

Rugby union national knockout cup competition in England

- Current season or competition: 2018–19 RFU Intermediate Cup
- Sport: Rugby union
- Instituted: 1997; 29 years ago
- Number of teams: Level 7 of English rugby
- Nations: England (RFU)
- Holders: Kenilworth (1st title) (2018–19)
- Website: England Rugby
- Related competition: Senior Vase, Junior Vase

The RFU Intermediate Cup is a rugby union national knockout cup competition in England run by the Rugby Football Union. It is contested by teams at level 7 of the English rugby union system. While the competition is a national one, it is however split into regions until the semi-finals with the final being held at Twickenham Stadium in London. It was first contested in 1997. Presently, the RFU Intermediate Cup is the third most important club cup competition in England, behind the Premiership Rugby Cup and RFU Championship Cup.

== History ==
The RFU Intermediate Cup was first contested in 1997 for clubs at Level 7 of English rugby. The competition was initially unsponsored but later gained sponsorship from NPI, Powergen and EDF Energy before becoming known as the "RFU Intermediate Cup" solely un-sponsored by 2008. The largest crowd for a final was set in 2016 for the match between Kent based Tunbridge Wells RFC and Cumbria's St. Benedict's where 9,000 Tunbridge Wells fans attended the final. A number of future RFU Championship clubs have played in the RFU Intermediate Cup prior to promotion to the second tier with Jersey Reds, Hartpury College, Doncaster Knights and Richmond all taking part in the past.

== Current format ==
The rounds are contested on a regional basis between the four regional unions until the semi-finals, where the winner of each region enters the national competition. Each region decides their representative separately. For example, London and South East use a direct knockout competition of all teams in the region while South West split their region into Southern Counties and South Western Counties with the winners playing each other to be the region's representative. Each regional champion plays another set champion with the ground being one of the semi-finalist's home. The semi-finals pairings are London & South East against South West and Midlands against North. The winners of the semis play each other in the final at Twickenham Stadium.

=== North ===
The format for northern teams involved in the RFU Intermediate Cup is a league-cup hybrid with each county union in the region selecting one representative each. The first stage features a mini league with clubs from Cheshire, Cumbria and Lancashire meeting in one pool and clubs from Durham County, Northumberland and Yorkshire, meeting in the other, each side playing 2 games each. The winners of each group then meet in the north final to determine who goes forward to the national semi-finals. The competition involves representative teams from the following level 7 leagues:

- Cumbria 1
- Durham/Northumberland 1
- Lancs/Cheshire 1
- Yorkshire 1

=== Midlands ===
The format for Midlands teams involved in the RFU Senior Vase is a direct knockout cup with a 1st round, 2nd round, 3rd round, semi-finals and final. The winner of the final goes forward to the Senior Vase national semi-finals. The competition involves all teams from the following level 7 leagues:

- Midlands 2 West (North)
- Midlands 2 West (South)
- Midlands 2 East (North)
- Midlands 2 East (South)

=== London and South East ===
As with the Midlands the format for London and South East teams involved in the RFU Senior Vase is a direct knockout cup with a 1st round, 2nd round, 3rd round, semi-finals and final. The winner of the final goes forward to the Senior Vase national semi-finals. The competition involves all teams from the following level 7 leagues:

- London 2 North East
- London 2 North West
- London 2 South East
- London 2 South West

=== South West ===
The format for the south-west teams is more complex with different methods of qualification decided on by the county unions that they represent. Clubs that are affiliated with Dorset & Wilts and Gloucestershire play in county based knock-out competitions first. The winners of the Dorset & Wilts competition then plays in the Southern Counties semi-finals against representatives from Berkshire, Buckinghamshire and Oxfordshire, while the Gloucestershire winners play in the South West Counties semi-finals against representative from Cornwall, Devon and Somerset, with the winners then meeting in a regional final. Finally, the Southern Counties and South West Counties winners meet to determine qualification for the national semi-finals. Teams involved are from the following level 7 leagues:

- Southern Counties North
- Southern Counties South
- Counties 1 Western North
- Counties 1 Western West

== Competition results ==
Season	Winner	Score	Runners–up	Name
1996–97	Thanet Wanderers (SE)	21–13	Doncaster (N)	NPI Intermediate Cup
1997–98	Bedford Athletic (M)	29–24 (aet)	Stroud (SW)	NPI Intermediate Cup
1998–99	Aldwinians (N)	21–10	Dudley Kingswinford (M)	NPI Intermediate Cup
1999–00	Dunstablians (M)	14–10	Hull Ionians (N)	NPI Intermediate Cup
2000–01	Old Patesians (SW)	25–24	Blaydon (N)	NPI Intermediate Cup
2001–02	Halifax (N)	43–19	Gosport and Fareham (SE)	Powergen Intermediate Cup
2002–03	Hertford (SE)	31–16	Bristol St Mary's Old Boys (SW)	Powergen Intermediate Cup
2003–04	Bradford & Bingley (N)	46–18	Gloucester Old Boys (SW)	Powergen Intermediate Cup
2004–05	Morley (N)	21–11	Westoe (N)	Powergen Intermediate Cup
2005–06	Stockport (N)	11–3	Morley (N)	Powergen Intermediate Cup
2006–07	Mounts Bay (SW)	46–36	Dunstablians (M)	EDF Energy Intermediate Cup
2007–08	Chester (N)	21–18	Birkenhead Park (N)	EDF Energy Intermediate Cup
2008–09	Hartpury College (SW)	41–31	Clifton (SW)	EDF Energy Intermediate Cup
2009–10	Old Redcliffians (SW)	42–21	Northern (N)	RFU Intermediate Cup
2010–11	Stoke-on-Trent (M)	16–10	Aylesford Bulls (SE)	RFU Intermediate Cup
2011–12	East Grinstead (SE)	34–18	Ilkley (N)	RFU Intermediate Cup
2012–13	Brighton (SE)	30–22	Bridlington (N)	RFU Intermediate Cup
2013–14	Trowbridge (SW)	22–19	Leek (M)	RFU Intermediate Cup
2014–15	Maidstone (SE)	31–18	Bridgnorth (M)	RFU Intermediate Cup
2015–16	Tunbridge Wells (SE)	56–14	St. Benedict's (N)	RFU Intermediate Cup
2016–17	West Leeds (N)	35–26	Charlton Park (SE)	RFU Intermediate Cup
2017–18	Camberley (SE)	63–14	Droitwich (M)	RFU Intermediate Cup
2018–19	Kenilworth (M)	32–26	Matson (SW)	RFU Intermediate Cup
2019-20	Not contested due to COVID-19 Pandemic			
(N) stands for Northern region, (M) for Midlands, (SE) for London & South East, (SW) for South-west

== Number of wins ==
=== Club ===
- Aldwinians (1)
- Bedford Athletic (1)
- Bradford & Bingley (1)
- Brighton (1)
- Camberley (1)
- Chester (1)
- Dunstablians (1)
- East Grinstead (1)
- Halifax (1)
- Hartpury College (1)
- Hertford (1)
- Kenilworth (1)
- Maidstone (1)
- Morley (1)
- Mounts Bay (1)
- Old Patesians (1)
- Old Redcliffians (1)
- Stockport (1)
- Stoke-on-Trent (1)
- Thanet Wanderers (1)
- Trowbridge (1)
- Tunbridge Wells (1)
- West Leeds (1)

=== Region ===
- London & South East (7)
- North (7)
- South West (5)
- Midlands (4)

== See also ==
- Anglo-Welsh Cup
- EDF Energy Trophy
- Premiership Rugby Cup
- RFU Championship Cup
- RFU Senior Vase
- RFU Junior Vase
- Rugby union in England
