= Alan Doherty (disambiguation) =

Alan Doherty is an Irish rugby union player

Alan Doherty (or variants) may also refer to:

- Alan Doherty, musician in Grada
- Allan Doherty, candidate in 1996 Yukon general election
- Allen Doherty of Worsley Works
- Alan Docherty, candidate for Darlington (UK Parliament constituency)
