= Hereford RFC =

English rugby union club, based in the Herefordshire

Hereford
- Full name: Hereford Rugby Football Club
- Union: North Midlands RFU
- Nickname(s): Wyesiders, Mud dogs
- Founded: 1870; 156 years ago
- Location: Hereford, Herefordshire, England
- Region: West Midlands
- Ground(s): Wyeside, Belvedere Lane (Capacity: 3,200 (200 seats))
- Chairman: Ivan Powell
- President: Spencer Goodall & Luke Yarranton (Vice)
- Coach(es): Head Coach - Dean Powell, Forwards Coach - Rhys Davies
- Captain: TBC
- Top scorer: Iwan Holder 24/25
- League: 1st XV - Regional 2 West Midlands. 2nd XV - Counties 3 Midlands West (South)
- 2024-25: 10th
Team kit

Official website
- herefordrfc.co.uk

Hereford Rugby Club is an English rugby union team based in Hereford, Herefordshire. The club operates three senior men's teams (HRFC, 1870’s and Lions), a colts team, a newly formed Ladies team and a full range of junior teams, from 6 to 16 years of age.

The first XV (HRFC) currently play in the sixth tier of the English rugby union system in Regional 2 West Midlands following relegation National League 3 Midlands at the end of the 2011–12 season.

Notable players include club legend and local lad, Josh Walker. Josh played a critical role in Swansea University's dominate 2014 win over fierce rivals Cardiff at the Millennium Stadium before returning to the club, amassing over 100 first XV caps.

The second XV (1870’s) currently play in the ninth tier of English rugby union system in Counties 3 Midlands West (South) following promotion in their first season in the league system at the end of the 2022-2023 season.

== History ==
Hereford Rugby Club was formed in 1870 and a history of the club from its formation until 1989 – two years after the formal start of league rugby – can be found on the club's website.

== Honours ==
- North Midlands Cup winners (3): 1987–88, 1989–90, 1991–92
- Midlands 2 West champions: 1987–88
- Midlands 1 champions (2): 1989–90, 1995–96
- Midlands 3 West (South) champions: 2006–07
- Midlands 2 (east v west) promotion play-off winners: 2008–09
