= Malvern RFC =

English rugby union club, based in the Worcestershire

- Full name: Malvern Rugby Football Club
- Union: North Midlands RFU
- Nickname(s): The Stags, Blackbirds
- Location: Malvern, Worcestershire
- Ground: Spring Lane
- Chairman: Andrew Longley
- President: David Smith
- Coach: Ieuan Mustow
- League: Regional 2 West Midlands
- 2025–26: 9th

Official website
- www.malvernrfc.co.uk/%20www.malvernrfc.co.uk

Malvern Rugby Football Club is a rugby union club based in the town of Malvern, Worcestershire, England. They currently play in Regional 2 West Midlands, a tier 6 league in the English rugby union system – after being relegated from Midlands 1 West at the end of the 2018–19 season. The club has three senior sides; 1st XV, 2nd XV, and a social 3rd XV. It also boasts of an academy, the Ian Budd Academy, named after the late Ian Budd, the founder of the academy. The club also has junior and mini sides from under-7s all the way up to under-16s and a thriving colts set-up, before these players graduate into the academy, and often into the senior sides from there. Malvern were relegated from the National leagues at the end of the 2012–13 season and returned to Midlands West One. They appointed former Gloucester Rugby player Rob Cook as director of rugby in 2017.

== Notable former players ==
- Tommy Hayes
- Tim Streather
- George Crook
- Tom "The Cube" Hale
- Joe Wilks
- Ted Hill

== Honours ==
- Pilkington Shield winners: 1993–94
- North Midlands 1 champions: 1994–95
- Midlands West 1 (Note: Not to be confused with Midlands 1 West.) champions: 1998–99
- Midlands 2 West champions (3): 1999–00, (Note: The 1999-00 title win was when division was a single league known as Midlands 2.) 2000–01, 2007–08
- North Midlands Cup winners: 2001–02
- Midlands 2 West (north v south) promotion play-off winners: 2017–18
- North Midlands Shield winners: 2017–18

== League history ==
- 1993-1994 Promotion to North Midlands 1
- 1994-1995 League Promotion to Midlands West 2
- 1995-1996 League Promotion to Midlands West 1
- 1996-1997 Runners-up in Midlands West 1
- 1997-1998 Midlands West 1
- 1998-1999 League Promotion to Midlands 2
- 1999-2000 Winners Midlands 2 but no promotion due to RFU league re-organisation
- 2000-2001 League winners - Promotion to Midlands 1
- 2001-2002 Midlands 1;
- 2002-2003 League relegation back to Midlands 2 (West)
- 2003-2004 Midlands 2 (West)
- 2004-2005 Runners-up Midlands 2 (West)
- 2005-2006 Midlands 2 (West)
- 2006-2007 Midlands 2 (West);
- 2007-2008 League Promotion to Midlands 1
- 2008-2009 Midlands 1
- 2009-2010 National 3 Midlands (North Midlands Reserve League Worcs/Hfds Merit Table)

== Player of the Season Award ==
- 2024-25 Jack Curtis
- 2025-26 Tom Bill
- 2026-27 Will Apps
- 2027-28 Connor Giggle

== 2nd Team Player of the Season ==
- 2024-25 Archie Strutton
- 2025-26 Oliver Minter

== Women's Touch Player of the Season ==
- 2025 Olivia Giggle
- 2026 Aimee Simpson

== Presidents Cup ==
Awarded to the young player of the season.

- 2024-25 Ben Gaubert
- 2025-26 Charlie Irish

== Chairmans Cup ==
Awarded to the volunteer of the season.

- 2024-25 Helen Owen
- 2025-26 Joe Wilks
