= Worcester Wanderers =

English rugby union club, based in Worcester

(England) Worcester Rugby Football Club
- Full name: Worcester Rugby Football Club
- Union: North Midlands RFU
- Nickname: Wanderers
- Founded: 1871; 155 years ago
- Location: Worcester, Worcestershire, England
- Ground: Weston Field Pitches
- Chairman: Stephen Lloyd
- President: Geoff Adams
- Director of Rugby: Niall Crawford
- Coach: Jonny Arr
- League: Counties 1 Midlands West (South)
- 2024–25: 6th

Official website
- worcesterrfc.rfu.club

WRFC 150th Year Badge

Worcester Wanderers are an English rugby union team and part of the club known as Worcester Rugby Football Club. The club was founded in 1871 and from it rose the former Gallagher Premiership team Worcester Warriors. Worcester RFC based in the city of Worcester play in Counties 1 Midlands West (South) a level 7 league in the English rugby union system. They play their home matches on the Weston's Field pitches, close to Sixways Stadium. The club has a mini and junior programme, a successful senior women's team (league champions 2021–22), a men's and women's colts as well as a men's and women's mixed ability team.

== Honours ==
- Midlands 4 West (South) champions: 2008–09
- Midlands 3 West (South) champions: 2009–10
- Midlands 1 (east v west) promotion play-off winner: 2012–13
