= Kenilworth RFC =

English rugby union club

Kenilworth
- Full name: Kenilworth Rugby Football Club
- Union: Warwickshire RFU
- Founded: 1924; 102 years ago
- Location: Kenilworth, Warwickshire, England
- Ground(s): Jack Davies Memorial Ground, Glasshouse Lane
- Chairman: Paul Fountaine
- President: Rich Bennett
- Coach(es): Matt Price, Jimmy Gopperth, Lewis Hall
- Captain: Ted Bromwich
- League: Regional 2 Midlands West
- 2023–24: 10th

Official website
- www.kenilworthrugby.co.uk

Kenilworth Rugby Club is an English rugby union team based in Kenilworth, Warwickshire. The club runs three senior sides, a veterans team and a full set of mini and junior teams. The first XV currently plays in Regional 2 Midlands West − a league at level 6 of the English rugby union system. The second XV currently plays in the Warwickshire League and the Women's team is coached by Becci Lewis and play in the Championship North 1 at level 2 of the Women's league structure.

== History ==
Kenilworth Rugby Club was formed in 1924. The 2000s saw the club progress up the league pyramid in recent years and reached level 5 and played in National League 3 Midlands until two consecutive relegations saw the club drop back to the seventh level, before promotion in 2012–13 back to level 6. After promotion in 2021–22 the Men's 1st XV reached level 5 again finishing 5th the following season. They were relegated in 2024/25 and now play in Regional 2 Midlands West.

Kenilworth RFC have a successful Women's section which was formed in 2015. After a number of promotions they now play in the 2nd tier of league rugby

== Honours ==
- Warwickshire 1 champions: 1990–91
- Midlands 2 West champions: 2006–07
- Midlands 2 West (South) champions (2): 2012–13, 2018–19
- RFU Intermediate Cup winners: 2018–19
- Warwickshire Cup winners: 2026-27
