= Barkers Butts RFC =

English rugby union club, based in Coventry, England

Barkers Butts
- Full name: Barkers Butts Rugby Football Club
- Union: Warwickshire Rugby Football Union
- Founded: 1947; 79 years ago
- Location: Coventry England
- Ground: The Bob Coward Memorial Ground
- League: Counties 2 Midlands West (East)
- 2024–25: 11th (relegated from Counties 1 Midlands West (South)
Team kit

Official website
- barkersbuttsrfc.rfu.club

Barkers Butts Rugby Football Club is a rugby union club in Allesley, Coventry, West Midlands. The first XV play in Counties 2 Midlands West (East) following their relegation from Counties 1 Midlands West (South) at the end of 2024–25 season. Counties 2 Midlands West (East)] is an eighth tier league in the English rugby union system, The club operates four senior teams, a colts side and the full range of junior teams for both boys and girls.

== League history ==
When the league system was established in 1987, Barkers Butts was placed in the fifth tier, playing in Midlands 1 and were runners up in the first season of league rugby. They finished in second place twice more (1990–91 and 1992–93) but were relegated from tier 5, then called Courage League Division 5, after the 1994–95 season. and have not played at that level since. Subsequently, they have alternated between the sixth and seventh levels.

== Honours ==
- Midlands 1 champions: 1993–94
- Midlands 2 West (South) champions (2): 2004–05, 2010–11
