= Whitchurch RFC =

English rugby union club, based in Shropshire

England, United Kingdom
- Full name: Whitchurch Rugby Club
- Union: North Midlands RFU
- Founded: 1936; 90 years ago
- Location: Whitchurch, Shropshire, England
- Ground: Edgeley Park
- Chairman: David Windsor
- President: Richard Charmley
- League: Regional 2 West Midlands
- 2024–25: 12th (relegated to Counties 1 Midlands West (North))
Team kit

Official website
- www.whitchurchrfc.co.uk

Whitchurch Rugby Club is an amateur rugby union club in Whitchurch, Shropshire. The club was formed in 1936 and currently competes in Counties 1 Midlands West (North) following their relegation from Regional 2 West Midlands, at the end of the 2024–25 season. Until the early 1970s, the club relied mainly on the facilities of the local Grammar School until the move to Edgeley Park where they now reside.

== History ==
In 1959 a pre-fabricated club house was opened in the town and then in 1970 a pitch was acquired on Edgeley Park followed in 1974 by a new clubhouse and changing rooms on the same site. Mini, junior, colts ladies and more senior teams followed. A major fire in 1986 did not prevent the club celebrating its golden jubilee that year and its diamond ten years later

By the 1980s Whitchurch established themselves as the leading Shropshire rugby union club; winning 9 from 11 county cups, becoming the first Shropshire club to secure the North Midlands Cup in 1997, again in 1999, and finalists in May, 2005. The senior team was placed in the North Midlands 1 division of the Courage League in 1987 and they progressed to Midlands 1 status in 1994. After the team won all 16 of their games in the 1997–98 season, Whitchurch were promoted to National Division Three North in 1998–99, which was maintained until 2002–03 when they dropped to Midlands 1, and in 2005–06 North 1. The club currently competes in the Counties 1 Midlands West (North).

Investment in clubhouse facilities in 1975 and again in 2004, with the opening of a new stand, ensured that the club maintained their position as one of the leading sporting clubs in the area. Every week four full size pitches accommodate four senior men's sides, one ladies XV, under-19's, under-17's plus the mini and junior teams.

Whitchurch RUFC has a dedicated youth structure and has produced some top rugby players over the years. Former Northampton Saints number eight, Mark Hopley began his playing career in the mini and junior teams at Whitchurch.

== Honours ==
- North Midlands 1 champions: 1990–91
- Midlands 2 champions: 1993–94
- North Midlands Cup winners (2): 1996–97, 1998–99
- Midlands 1 champions: 1997–98
- North Midlands Cup Plate winners: 2015–16
- Midlands 2 West (North) champions: 2017–18

== Statistics ==
Whitchurch RFC have played 699 matches since RFU leagues started in 1987.

Playing Stats
Games	Total
Won	348
Drawn	17
Lost	335

Information correct as of February 2023.
