= Alan Doherty =

Irish rugby union player (born 1945)

- Full name: Alan Edward Doherty
- Born: 31 July 1945 (age 81) Enniscorthy, Co. Wexford, Republic Ireland

Rugby union career
- Position: Centre
International career
Years	Team	Apps	(Points)
1974	Ireland	1	(0)

Alan Edward Doherty (born 31 July 1945) is an Irish former rugby union footballer.

Doherty, a native of Enniscorthy, was versed in rugby while at Kilkenny College, while also playing field hockey at schoolboy international level. He was a centre and made his senior debut for Enniscorthy RFC aged 17.

Early in his career, Doherty was based in England, where he competed for Bedford and London Irish, before returning to Ireland in 1970. He played in Ireland for Old Wesley, a side captained by his brother David.

Doherty appeared for Ireland in a centenary celebration match against a President's XV at Lansdowne Road in 1974, for which caps were awarded. He is believed to be the first person from Enniscorthy to be capped for Ireland.

== See also ==
- List of Ireland national rugby union players
