= Counties 1 Midlands West (South) =

Level seven English rugby union league

- Current season or competition: 2025–26 Counties 1 Midlands West (South)
- Sport: Rugby union
- Instituted: 1992; 34 years ago (as Midlands West 1)
- Number of teams: 12
- Country: England
- Holders: Luctonians II (2024–25)
- Most titles: Luctonians (3 titles)
- Website: England RFU

Counties 1 Midlands West (South) (formerly Midlands 2 West (South)) is a level seven English rugby union league and level three of the Midlands League, made up of teams from the southern part of the West Midlands region including Herefordshire, parts of Birmingham and the West Midlands, Warwickshire and Worcestershire, with home and away matches played throughout the season. When this division began in 1992 it was known as Midlands West 1, until it was split into two regional divisions called Midlands 3 West (North) and Midlands 3 West (South) ahead of the 2000–01 season. Further restructuring of the Midlands leagues ahead of the 2009–10 season, saw it changed to Midlands 2 West (South) and post the Rugby Football Union (RFU)'s Adult Competition Review, from season 2022–23 it adopted its current name.

Luctonians II are the current champions and are promoted to Regional 2 Midlands West.

== Format ==
The champions are promoted to Regional Midlands 2 West or occasionally to Regional 2 Midlands North . The number of teams relegated depends on feedback following promotion and relegation in the leagues above, but is usually to Counties 2 Midlands West (South).

The season runs from September to April and comprises twenty-two rounds of matches, with each club playing each of its rivals, home and away. The results of the matches contribute points to the league as follows:

- 4 points are awarded for a win
- 2 points are awarded for a draw
- 0 points are awarded for a loss, however
- 1 losing (bonus) point is awarded to a team that loses a match by 7 points or fewer
- 1 additional (bonus) point is awarded to a team scoring 4 tries or more in a match.

== 2026–27 ==
Departing were Worcester (champions) promoted to Regional 2 Midlands West while Kidderminster Carolians (11th) and Droitwich (12th) were relegated.

| Team | Ground | Capacity | City/Area | Previous season |
|---|---|---|---|---|
| Alcester | Birmingham Road | | Alcester, Warwickshire | 2nd |
| Barkers Butts | Bob Coward Memorial Ground | | Allesley, Coventry, West Midlands | Promoted from Counties 2 Midlands West (East) (champions) |
| Berkswell & Balsall | Honiley Road | | Balsall Common, Warwickshire | Promoted from Counties 2 Midlands West (East) (runners up) |
| Bromyard | Clive Richards Sports Ground | | Bromyard, Herefordshire | 6th |
| Camp Hill | The Shrine | | Shirley, Solihull, West Midlands | 3rd |
| Earlsdon | Mitchell Avenue | | Canley, Coventry, West Midlands | 7th |
| Evesham | Lower Albert Road | | Evesham, Worcestershire | 5th |
| Leamington | Moorefields | | Royal Leamington Spa, Warwickshire | 8th |
| Ledbury | Ross Road | | Ledbury, Herefordshire | 4th |
| Manor Park | Griff & Coton | | Nuneaton, Warwickshire | 9th |
| Old Leamingtonians | The Crofts | | Blackdown, Warwickshire | 10th |
| Stratford-upon-Avon | Loxley Road | | Stratford-upon-Avon, Warwickshire | Relegated from Regional 2 Midlands West (11th) |

Locations of the 2026–27 Counties 1 Midlands West (South) teams
Locations of the 2026–27 Counties 1 Midlands West (South) teams in Coventry & Royal Leamington Spa

== 2025–26 ==
Departing were Luctonians 2XV (champions) and Old Coventrians (runner-up) promoted to Regional 2 Midlands West and Regional 2 Midlands East respectively while Berkswell & Balsall (10th), Barkers Butts (11th) and Bromsgrove 2XV (12th) were all relegated to Counties 2 Midlands West (East). Manor Park were level transferred from Counties 1 Midlands East (North).

| Team | Ground | Capacity | City/Area | Previous season |
|---|---|---|---|---|
| Alcester | Birmingham Road | | Alcester, Warwickshire | 5th |
| Bromyard | Clive Richards Sports Ground | | Bromyard, Herefordshire | Promoted from Counties 2 Midlands West (West) |
| Camp Hill | The Shrine | | Shirley, Solihull, West Midlands | 3rd |
| Droitwich | Glyn Mitchell Memorial Ground | 3,000 | Droitwich, Worcestershire | 9th |
| Earlsdon | Mitchell Avenue | | Canley, Coventry, West Midlands | Promoted from Counties 2 Midlands West (East) |
| Evesham | Lower Albert Road | | Evesham, Worcestershire | 4th |
| Kidderminster Carolians | Marlpool Lane | | Kidderminster, Worcestershire | Level transfer from Counties 1 Midlands West (North) (8th) |
| Leamington | Moorefields | | Royal Leamington Spa, Warwickshire | 8th |
| Ledbury | Ross Road | | Ledbury, Herefordshire | Relegated from Regional 2 Midlands West (11th) |
| Manor Park | Griff & Coton | | Nuneaton, Warwickshire | Level transfer from Counties 1 Midlands East (North) (8th) |
| Old Leamingtonians | The Crofts | | Blackdown, Warwickshire | 7th |
| Worcester | Offerton Lane | | Worcester, Worcestershire | 6th |

Locations of the 2025–26 Counties 1 Midlands West (South) teams

Locations of the 2025–26 Counties 1 Midlands West (South) teams in Coventry & Royal Leamington Spa

== 2024–25 ==
Departing were Ledbury, promoted to Regional 2 Midlands West as runners-up (Luctonians 2XV finished top but were not permitted to be promoted on Level 6 owing to league rules on reserve teams in the RFU leagues). Broadstreet 2XV and Earlsdon were relegated to Counties 2 Midlands West (East). Manor Park moved on a level transfer to Counties 1 Midlands East (North).

Joining were Barkers Butts, Camp Hill, Worcester and Berkswell & Balsall.

| Team | Ground | Capacity | City/Area | Previous season |
|---|---|---|---|---|
| Alcester | Birmingham Road | | Alcester, Warwickshire | 6th |
| Barkers Butts | Bob Coward Memorial Ground | | Allesley, Coventry, West Midlands | Promoted from Counties 2 Midlands West (East) (champions) |
| Berkswell & Balsall | Honiley Road | | Balsall Common, Warwickshire | Relegated from Regional 2 Midlands West |
| Bromsgrove 2XV | Finstall Park | | Bromsgrove, Worcestershire | 8th |
| Camp Hill | The Shrine | | Shirley, Solihull, West Midlands | Level transfer from Counties 1 Midlands West (North) (10th) |
| Droitwich | Glyn Mitchell Memorial Ground | 3,000 | Droitwich, Worcestershire | 9th |
| Evesham | Lower Albert Road | | Evesham, Worcestershire | 3rd |
| Leamington | Moorefields | | Royal Leamington Spa, Warwickshire | 4th |
| Luctonians 2XV | Mortimer Park | 2,500 (300 seats) | Kingsland, Herefordshire | Champions (not promoted) |
| Old Coventrians | Tile Hill Lane | | Tile Hill, Coventry, West Midlands | 10th |
| Old Leamingtonians | The Crofts | | Blackdown, Warwickshire | 7th |
| Worcester | Offerton Lane | | Worcester, Worcestershire | Relegated from Regional 2 Midlands West |

Locations of the 2024–25 Counties 1 Midlands West (South) teams
Locations of the 2024–25 Counties 1 Midlands West (South) teams in Coventry & Royal Leamington Spa

=== League table ===
2024–25 Counties 1 Midlands West (South)
| | | Played | Won | Drawn | Lost | Points for | Points against | Points diff | Try bonus | Loss bonus | Points |
| 1 | Luctonians II | 22 | 20 | 0 | 2 | 1033 | 263 | 770 | 21 | 2 | 103 |
| 2 | Old Coventrians (P) | 22 | 18 | 0 | 4 | 747 | 532 | 215 | 17 | 2 | 91 |
| 3 | Camp Hill | 22 | 16 | 0 | 6 | 773 | 581 | 192 | 19 | 3 | 86 |
| 4 | Evesham | 22 | 14 | 0 | 8 | 592 | 522 | 70 | 14 | 5 | 75 |
| 5 | Alcester | 22 | 13 | 0 | 9 | 668 | 423 | 245 | 13 | 3 | 68 |
| 6 | Worcester | 22 | 11 | 0 | 11 | 550 | 600 | −50 | 10 | 5 | 59 |
| 7 | Old Leamingtonians | 22 | 10 | 0 | 12 | 589 | 733 | −144 | 10 | 2 | 52 |
| 8 | Leamington | 22 | 8 | 0 | 14 | 539 | 556 | −17 | 11 | 5 | 48 |
| 9 | Droitwich | 22 | 8 | 0 | 14 | 415 | 712 | −297 | 7 | 3 | 42 |
| 10 | Berkswell & Balsall | 22 | 7 | 0 | 15 | 422 | 651 | −229 | 9 | 4 | 41 |
| 11 | Barkers Butt (R) | 22 | 4 | 0 | 18 | 482 | 706 | −224 | 8 | 6 | 30 |
| 12 | Bromsgrove II (R) | 22 | 3 | 0 | 19 | 358 | 889 | −531 | 4 | 5 | 21 |
If teams are level at any stage, tiebreakers are applied in the following order: 1. Number of matches won 2. Difference between points for and against 3. Total number of points for 4. Aggregate number of points scored in matches between tied teams 5. Number of matches won excluding the first match, then the second and so on until the tie is settled
Green background is the promotion place Pink background are the relegation places Updated: 4 November 2025

== 2023–24 ==
=== Participating teams and location ===
Departing were Berkswell & Balsall, promoted to Regional 2 Midlands West. Barkers Butts and Coventry Welsh were relegated to Counties 2 Midlands West (East). Kidderminster Carolians (2nd) and Spartans (9th) moved on a level transfer to Counties 1 Midlands West (North).

Joining were Manor Park (champions) and Alcester (runner-up); promoted from Counties 2 Midlands West (South), while Evesham (11th) and Droitwich (12th) were relegated from Regional 2 West Midlands. Luctonians II, as champions, were level-transferred from Counties 1 Midlands West (North) – promotion to level 6 was not permitted due to league rules on reserve teams in the RFU leagues.

| Team | Ground | Capacity | City/Area | Previous season |
|---|---|---|---|---|
| Alcester | Birmingham Road | | Alcester, Warwickshire | Promoted from Counties 2 Midlands West (South) (runners-up) |
| Broadstreet 2XV | Ivor Preece Field | 1,500 (250 seats) | Binley Woods, Coventry, West Midlands | 10th |
| Bromsgrove 2XV | Finstall Park | | Bromsgrove, Worcestershire | 8th |
| Droitwich | Glyn Mitchell Memorial Ground | 3,000 | Droitwich, Worcestershire | Relegated from Regional 2 Midlands West (12th) |
| Earlsdon | Mitchell Avenue | | Canley, Coventry, West Midlands | 7th |
| Evesham | Lower Albert Road | | Evesham, Worcestershire | Relegated from Regional 2 Midlands West (11th) |
| Ledbury | Ross Road | | Ledbury, Herefordshire | 4th |
| Leamington | Moorefields | | Royal Leamington Spa, Warwickshire | 5th |
| Luctonians 2XV | Mortimer Park | 2,500 (300 seats) | Kingsland, Herefordshire | Level transfer from Counties 1 Midlands West (North) (champions) |
| Manor Park | Griff & Coton | | Nuneaton, Warwickshire | Promoted from Counties 2 Midlands West (South) (champions) |
| Old Coventrians | Tile Hill Lane | | Tile Hill, Coventry, West Midlands | 6th |
| Old Leamingtonians | The Crofts | | Blackdown, Warwickshire | 3rd |

Locations of the 2023–24 Counties 1 Midlands West (South) teams
Locations of the 2023–24 Counties 1 Midlands West (South) teams in Coventry & Royal Leamington Spa

=== League table ===
2023–24 Counties 1 Midlands West (South)
| | | Played | Won | Drawn | Lost | Points for | Points against | Points diff | Try bonus | Loss bonus | Points | Pts adj |
| 1 | Luctonians II | 22 | 22 | 0 | 0 | 981 | 229 | 752 | 20 | 0 | 109 | |
| 2 | Ledbury (P) | 22 | 17 | 0 | 5 | 836 | 378 | 458 | 16 | 3 | 87 | |
| 3 | Evesham | 22 | 14 | 2 | 6 | 650 | 489 | 161 | 14 | 2 | 76 | |
| 4 | Leamington | 22 | 14 | 0 | 8 | 715 | 494 | 221 | 16 | 3 | 75 | |
| 5 | Manor Park | 22 | 14 | 1 | 7 | 622 | 439 | 183 | 13 | 2 | 73 | |
| 6 | Alcester | 22 | 12 | 1 | 9 | 545 | 505 | 40 | 11 | 5 | 63 | |
| 7 | Old Leamingtonians | 22 | 10 | 1 | 11 | 505 | 493 | 12 | 10 | 2 | 54 | |
| 8 | Bromsgrove II | 22 | 8 | 1 | 13 | 448 | 671 | −223 | 7 | 2 | 45 | |
| 9 | Droitwich RFC | 22 | 6 | 1 | 15 | 453 | 745 | −292 | 9 | 4 | 40 | |
| 10 | Old Coventrians | 22 | 6 | 0 | 16 | 472 | 769 | −297 | 9 | 2 | 33 | −2 |
| 11 | Broadstreet II (R) | 22 | 2 | 0 | 20 | 313 | 913 | −600 | 2 | 1 | 6 | −5 |
| 12 | Earlsdon (R) | 22 | 3 | 1 | 18 | 303 | 718 | −415 | 2 | 2 | 3 | −15 |
If teams are level at any stage, tiebreakers are applied in the following order: 1. Number of matches won 2. Difference between points for and against 3. Total number of points for 4. Aggregate number of points scored in matches between tied teams 5. Number of matches won excluding the first match, then the second and so on until the tie is settled
Green background is the promotion place Pink background are the relegation places Updated: 4 November 2025

== 2022–23 ==
=== Participating teams and location ===
This was the first season following the RFU Adult Competition Review with the league adopting its new name of Counties 1 Midlands West (South).

Departing were Evesham, promoted to Regional 2 Midlands West and Old Laurentians promoted to Regional 2 Midlands East, whilst Nuneaton Old Edwardians and Silhillians were promoted to Regional 2 Midlands North. Pinley were relegated to Counties 2 Midlands West (South).

Joining were Ledbury, Old Leamingtonians and Coventry Welsh promoted from Midlands 3 West (South) together with new entries Broadstreet 2XV and Bromsgrove 2XV.

| Team | Ground | Capacity | City/Area | Previous season |
|---|---|---|---|---|
| Barkers Butts | Bob Coward Memorial Ground | | Allesley, Coventry, West Midlands | 5th |
| Berkswell & Balsall | Honiley Road | | Balsall Common, Warwickshire | 6th |
| Broadstreet 2XV | Ivor Preece Field | 1,500 (250 seats) | Binley Woods, Coventry, West Midlands | New entry |
| Bromsgrove 2XV | Finstall Park | | Bromsgrove, Worcestershire | New entry |
| Coventry Welsh | Burbages Lane | | Exhall, Coventry, West Midlands | Promoted from Midlands 3 West (South) (3rd) |
| Earlsdon | Mitchell Avenue | | Canley, Coventry, West Midlands | 11th |
| Kidderminster Carolians | Marlpool Lane | | Kidderminster, Worcestershire | 7th |
| Ledbury | Ross Road | | Ledbury, Herefordshire | Promoted from Midlands 3 West (South) (champions) |
| Leamington | Moorefields | | Royal Leamington Spa, Warwickshire | 9th |
| Old Coventrians | Tile Hill Lane | | Tile Hill, Coventry, West Midlands | 10th |
| Old Leamingtonians | The Crofts | | Blackdown, Warwickshire | Promoted from Midlands 3 West (South) (2nd) |
| Spartans | Coppice Lane | | Middleton, Sutton Coldfield, West Midlands | 8th |

Locations of the 2022–23 Counties 1 Midlands West (South) teams
Locations of the 2022–23 Counties 1 Midlands West (South) teams in Coventry & Royal Leamington Spa

=== League table ===
2022–23 Counties 1 Midlands West (South)
| | | Played | Won | Drawn | Lost | Points for | Points against | Points diff | Try bonus | Loss bonus | Points | Pts adj |
| 1 | Berkswell & Balsall (P) | 22 | 17 | 1 | 4 | 688 | 435 | 253 | 16 | 2 | 88 | |
| 2 | Kidderminster Carolians | 22 | 16 | 0 | 6 | 798 | 419 | 379 | 18 | 4 | 87 | |
| 3 | Old Leamingtonians | 22 | 16 | 0 | 6 | 688 | 436 | 252 | 16 | 5 | 85 | |
| 4 | Ledbury | 22 | 15 | 0 | 7 | 620 | 423 | 197 | 13 | 2 | 75 | |
| 5 | Leamington | 21 | 13 | 0 | 8 | 588 | 401 | 187 | 11 | 3 | 66 | |
| 6 | Old Coventrians | 21 | 10 | 1 | 10 | 621 | 595 | 26 | 13 | 1 | 56 | |
| 7 | Earlsdon | 22 | 11 | 0 | 11 | 456 | 595 | −139 | 6 | 2 | 47 | −5 |
| 8 | Bromsgrove II | 22 | 8 | 1 | 13 | 504 | 661 | −157 | 7 | 3 | 44 | |
| 9 | Spartans | 22 | 7 | 1 | 14 | 458 | 581 | −123 | 8 | 5 | 43 | |
| 10 | Broadstreet II | 22 | 7 | 0 | 15 | 419 | 599 | −180 | 7 | 6 | 41 | |
| 11 | Barkers Butts (R) | 22 | 5 | 0 | 17 | 347 | 605 | −258 | 6 | 4 | 30 | |
| 12 | Coventry Welsh (R) | 22 | 4 | 0 | 18 | 375 | 812 | −437 | 8 | 4 | 28 | |
If teams are level at any stage, tiebreakers are applied in the following order: 1. Number of matches won 2. Difference between points for and against 3. Total number of points for 4. Aggregate number of points scored in matches between tied teams 5. Number of matches won excluding the first match, then the second and so on until the tie is settled
Green background is the promotion place Pink background are the relegation places Updated: 3 November 2025

== 2021–22 ==
| Team | Ground | Capacity | City/Area | Previous season |
|---|---|---|---|---|
| Barkers Butts | Bob Coward Memorial Ground | | Allesley, Coventry, West Midlands | 4th |
| Berkswell & Balsall | Honiley Road | | Balsall Common, Warwickshire | Promoted from Midlands 3 West South (runners-up) |
| Earlsdon | Mitchell Avenue | | Canley, Coventry, West Midlands | 10th |
| Evesham | Lower Albert Road | | Evesham, Worcestershire | 11th |
| Kidderminster Carolians | Marlpool Lane | | Kidderminster, Worcestershire | Relegated from Midlands 1 West (14th) |
| Leamington | Moorefields | | Royal Leamington Spa, Warwickshire | 5th |
| Nuneaton Old Edwardians | Weddington Road | | Nuneaton, Warwickshire | 3rd |
| Old Coventrians | Tile Hill Lane | | Tile Hill, Coventry, West Midlands | Promoted from Midlands 3 West South (champions) |
| Old Laurentians | Fenley Field | | Rugby, Warwickshire | 6th |
| Pinley | Wyken Croft | | Wyken, Coventry, West Midlands | 8th |
| Silhillians | The Memorial Ground | | Solihull, West Midlands | 7th |
| Spartans | Coppice Lane | | Middleton, Sutton Coldfield, West Midlands | 9th |

Locations of the 2021–22 Midlands 2 West (South) teams in Worcestershire
Locations of the 2021–22 Midlands 2 West (South) teams in Warwickshire & the West Midlands

== 2020–21 ==
Due to the COVID-19 pandemic, the 2020–21 season was cancelled.

== 2019–20 ==
| Team | Ground | Capacity | City/Area | Previous season |
|---|---|---|---|---|
| Barkers Butts | Bob Coward Memorial Ground | | Allesley, Coventry, West Midlands | 6th |
| Earlsdon | Mitchell Avenue | | Canley, Coventry, West Midlands | 5th |
| Evesham | Lower Albert Road | | Evesham, Worcestershire | 8th |
| Leamington | Moorefields | | Royal Leamington Spa, Warwickshire | 9th |
| Malvern | Spring Lane | | Malvern, Worcestershire | Relegated from Midlands 1 West (13th) |
| Nuneaton Old Edwardians | Weddington Road | | Nuneaton, Warwickshire | 4th |
| Old Laurentians | Fenley Field | | Rugby, Warwickshire | 3rd |
| Pinley | Wyken Croft | | Wyken, Coventry, West Midlands | Promoted from Midlands 3 WN (champions) |
| Silhillians | The Memorial Ground | | Solihull, West Midlands | 7th |
| Southam | The Rugby Field | | Southam, Warwickshire | 10th |
| Spartans | Coppice Lane | | Middleton, Sutton Coldfield, West Midlands | Level transfer from Midlands 2 West (North) (9th) |
| Stratford-upon-Avon | Loxley Road | | Stratford-upon-Avon, Warwickshire | Relegated from South West 1 East (14th) |

Locations of the 2019–20 Midlands 2 West (South) teams in Worcestershire
Locations of the 2019–20 Midlands 2 West (South) teams in Warwickshire & the West Midlands

== 2018–19 ==
| Team | Ground | Capacity | City/Area | Previous season |
|---|---|---|---|---|
| Barkers Butts | Bob Coward Memorial Ground | | Allesley, Coventry, West Midlands | 5th |
| Earlsdon | Mitchell Avenue | | Canley, Coventry, West Midlands | 4th |
| Evesham | Lower Albert Road | | Evesham, Worcestershire | 6th |
| Kenilworth | Glasshouse Lane | | Kenilworth, Warwickshire | 3rd |
| Kidderminster Carolians | Marlpool Lane | | Kidderminster, Worcestershire | Level transfer from Midlands 2 West (North) (9th) |
| Leamington | Moorefields | | Royal Leamington Spa, Warwickshire | 8th |
| Nuneaton Old Edwardians | Weddington Road | | Nuneaton, Warwickshire | 9th |
| Old Coventrians | Tile Hill Lane | | Tile Hill, Coventry, West Midlands | Promoted from Midlands 3 West (South) (runners up) |
| Old Laurentians | Fenley Field | | Rugby, Warwickshire | Level transfer from Midlands 2 East (South) (5th) |
| Rugby St Andrews | Ashlawn Road | | Rugby, Warwickshire | Promoted from Midlands 3 West (South) (champions) |
| Silhillians | The Memorial Ground | | Solihull, West Midlands | 7th |
| Southam | The Rugby Field | | Southam, Warwickshire | 10th |

Locations of the 2018–19 Midlands 2 West (South) teams in Worcestershire
Locations of the 2018–19 Midlands 2 West (South) teams in Warwickshire & West Midlands

== 2017–18 ==
| Team | Ground | Capacity | City/Area | Previous season |
|---|---|---|---|---|
| Barkers Butts | Bob Coward Memorial Ground | | Allesley, Coventry, West Midlands | 10th |
| Berkswell & Balsall | Honiley Road | | Balsall Common, Warwickshire | 4th |
| Droitwich | Glyn Mitchell Memorial Ground | 3,000 | Droitwich, Worcestershire | Promoted from Midlands 3 West (South) (champions) |
| Earlsdon | Mitchell Avenue | | Canley, Coventry, West Midlands | 6th |
| Evesham | Lower Albert Road | | Evesham, Worcestershire | Promoted from Midlands 3 West (South) (runners up) |
| Kenilworth | Glasshouse Lane | | Kenilworth, Warwickshire | Relegated from Midlands 1 West (14th) |
| Leamington | Moorefields | | Royal Leamington Spa, Warwickshire | 9th |
| Malvern | Spring Lane | | Malvern, Worcestershire | 5th |
| Nuneaton Old Edwardians | Weddington Road | | Nuneaton, Warwickshire | 11th |
| Old Yardleians | Tilehouse Lane | | Shirley, Solihull, West Midlands | Level transfer from Midlands 2 West (North) (10th) |
| Silhillians | The Memorial Ground | | Solihull, West Midlands | 2nd (lost promotion play-off) |
| Southam | The Rugby Field | | Southam, Warwickshire | 8th |

Locations of the 2017–18 Midlands 2 West (South) teams in Worcestershire
Locations of the 2017–18 Midlands 2 West (South) teams in Warwickshire & West Midlands

== 2016–17 ==
- Barkers Butts
- Berkswell & Balsall
- Dunlop
- Earlsdon
- Leamington
- Malvern
- Nuneaton Old Edwardians
- Pinley
- Rugby Lions (promoted from Midlands 3 West (South))
- Silhillians (relegated from Midlands 1 West)
- Southam (promoted from Midlands 3 West (South))
- Spartans (Midlands)

== 2015–16 ==
- Banbury
- Barkers Butts (relegated from Midlands 1 West)
- Bedworth (promoted from Midlands 3 West (South))
- Berkswell & Balsall (relegated from Midlands 1 West)
- Droitwich
- Dunlop (promoted from Midlands 3 West (South))
- Earlsdon (relegated from Midlands 1 West)
- Leamington
- Malvern
- Nuneaton Old Edwardians
- Pilney
- Spartans (Midlands)

== 2014–15 ==
- Banbury
- Droitwich
- Leamington
- Malvern (relegated from Midlands 1 West)
- Newbold on Avon
- Nuneaton Old Edwardians
- Old Coventrians
- Old Laurentians (relegated from Midlands 1 West)
- Old Leamingtonians
- Old Yardleians (promoted from Midlands 3 West (South))
- Pilney(promoted from Midlands 3 West (South))
- Spartans (Midlands)

== 2013–14 ==
- Banbury
- Bedworth
- Droitwich
- Dunlop
- Earlsdon
- Kidderminster
- Leamington
- Nuneaton Old Edwardians
- Old Coventrians (promoted from Midlands 3 West (South))
- Old Leamingtonians (promoted from Midlands 3 West (South))
- Spartans (Midlands)
- Stourbridge Lions

== 2012–13 ==
- Banbury
- Bedworth
- Droitwich
- Dunlop
- Earlsdon
- Kenilworth (relegated from Midlands 1 West)
- Kidderminster
- Leamington
- Newbold-on-Avon
- Old Laurentians
- Shipton-on-Stour
- Upton-on-Severn

== 2011–12 ==
- Banbury
- Barkers Butts
- Barkswell & Balsall
- Cheltenham North
- Droitwich
- Kidderminster Carolians
- Leamington
- Newbold-on-Avon
- Old Laurentians
- Pershore
- Silhillians
- Upton on Severn

== 2008–09 ==
- Barkers Butts
- Berkswell & Balsall
- Droitwich
- Earlsdon
- Kidderminster Carolians
- Leamington
- Newbold-on-Avon
- Nuneaton Old Edwardians
- Old Coventrians
- Old Laurentians
- Silhillians
- Spartans

== Original teams ==
Teams in Midlands 2 West (North) and Midlands 2 West (South) were originally part of a single division called Midlands 1 West, which contained the following sides when it was introduced in 1992:

- Bromsgrove - relegated from Midlands 2 West (11th)
- Dudley Kingswinford - promoted from North Midlands 1 (runners up)
- Kings Norton - promoted from North Midlands 1 (4th)
- Leek - promoted from Staffordshire/Warwickshire 1 (4th)
- Ludlow - promoted from North Midlands 1 (5th)
- Newbold-on-Avon - relegated from Midlands 2 West (9th)
- Newcastle (Staffs) - promoted from Staffordshire/Warwickshire 1 (runners up)
- Old Halesonians (Note: Old Boys side of Halesowen Grammar School.) - promoted from North Midlands 1 (3rd)
- Old Leamingtonians (Note: Old Boys side of Leamington College.) - promoted from Staffordshire/Warwickshire 1 (5th)
- Old Longtonians (Note: Formed as Old Boys side of Longton High School, Old Longtonians would be renamed as Longton Rugby Club in 1994.) - promoted from Staffordshire/Warwickshire 1 (champions)
- Old Yardleians (Note: Old Boys side of Yardley Grammar School.) - promoted from North Midlands 1 (champions)
- Sutton Coldfield - relegated from Midlands 2 West (10th)
- Willenhall - promoted from Staffordshire/Warwickshire 1 (3rd)

== Midlands 2 West (South) honours ==
=== Midlands West 1 (1992–1993) ===
Midlands 2 West (North) and Midlands 2 West (South) were originally part of a single tier 7 division called Midlands West 1. Promotion was to Midlands 2 and relegation to Midlands West 2 (Note: Midlands West 2 is currently split into two regional divisions – Midlands 4 West (North) and Midlands 4 West (South).).

Midlands West 1
| Season | No of teams | Champions | Runners–up | Relegated teams | Reference |
| 1992–93 | 13 | Willenhall | Newbold-on-Avon | Old Yardleians | |
Green backgrounds are the promotion places.

=== Midlands West 1 (1993–1996) ===
The top six teams from Midlands 1 and the top six from North 1 were combined to create National 5 North, meaning Midlands 1 West became a tier 8 league. Promotion and relegation continued to Midlands 2 and Midlands West 2.

Midlands West 1
| Season | No of teams | Champions | Runners–up | Relegated teams | Reference |
| 1993–94 | 13 | Sutton Coldfield | Bromsgrove | Nuneaton Old Edwardians | |
| 1994–95 | 13 | Newport (Salop) | Longton | Ludlow, Newcastle (Staffs) | |
| 1995–96 | 13 | Luctonians | Dudley Kingswinford (Note: Due to the cancellation of National 5 North at the end of the season, five clubs were promoted including Kenilworth, Bromsgrove and Old Laurentians.) | No relegation (Note: Due to widespread restructuring caused by the cancellation of National 5 North there was no relegation.) | |
Green backgrounds are the promotion places.

=== Midlands West 1 (1996–2000) ===
At the end of the 1995–96 season National 5 North was discontinued and Midlands West 1 returned to being a tier 7 league. Promotion and relegation continued to Midlands 2 and Midlands West 2.

Midlands West 1
| Season | No of teams | Champions | Runners–up | Relegated teams | Reference |
| 1996–97 | 17 | Longton | Malvern | Dixonians, Stoke Old Boys, Tamworth | |
| 1997–98 | 17 | Newbold-on-Avon | Keresley | Nuneaton Old Edwardians | |
| 1998–99 | 17 | Malvern | Selly Oak | Ludlow, Willenhall, Leek | |
| 1999–00 | 17 | Selly Oak | Shrewsbury | No relegation (Note: Due to the restructuring of the Midlands leagues for the following season, there was no relegation.) | |
Green backgrounds are the promotion places.

=== Midlands 3 West (South) (2000–2009) ===
Restructuring ahead of the 2000–01 season saw Midlands West 1 split into two tier 7 regional leagues – Midlands 3 West (North) and Midlands 3 West (South). Promotion was now to Midlands 2 West (formerly Midlands 2) and relegation to Midlands 4 West (South) (formerly Midlands West 2) (Note: Ahead of the 2000–01 Midlands West 2 was also split into two regional leagues – Midlands 4 West (North) and Midlands 4 West (South).).

Midlands 3 West (South)
| Season | No of teams | Champions | Runners–up | Relegated teams | Reference |
| 2000–01 | 9 | Stratford-upon-Avon | Leamington | Kings Norton | |
| 2001–02 | 10 | Leamington | Bedworth | No relegation | |
| 2002–03 | 10 | Nuneaton Old Edwardians | Old Coventrians | Evesham, Birmingham Exiles | |
| 2003–-04 | 12 | Old Coventrians | Leamington | Southam, Keresley | |
| 2004–05 | 12 | Barkers Butts | Pershore | Shipston on Stour, Droitwich | |
| 2005–06 | 12 | Solihull | Hereford | Keresley, Old Leamingtonians | |
| 2006–07 | 12 | Hereford | Stratford-upon-Avon | Old Coventrians, Ledbury | |
| 2007–08 | 12 | Sutton Coldfield | Droitwich | Edwardians, Bedworth, Stourbridge Lions | |
| 2008–09 | 12 | Leamington | Nuneaton Old Edwardians | No relegation | |
Green backgrounds are promotion places.

=== Midlands 2 West (South) (2009–2022) ===
League restructuring by the RFU meant that Midlands 3 West (North) and Midlands 3 West (South) were renamed as Midlands 2 West (North) and Midlands 2 West (South), with both leagues remaining at tier 7. Promotion was to Midlands 1 West (formerly Midlands 2 West) and relegation to Midlands 3 West (South) (formerly Midlands 4 West (South)).

Midlands 2 West (South)
| Season | No of teams | Champions | Runners–up | Relegated teams | Reference |
| 2009–10 | 12 | Worcester Wanderers | Old Laurentians | Newbold on Avon, Old Coventrians | |
| 2010–11 | 12 | Dunlop | Bedworth | Earlsdon, Old Coventrians | |
| 2011–12 | 12 | Barkers Butts | Berkswell & Balsall | Cheltenham North, Pershore | |
| 2012–13 | 12 | Kenilworth | Old Laurentians | Upton-on-Severn, Shipston on Stour | |
| 2013–14 | 12 | Earlsdon | Banbury | Bedworth, Dunlop | |
| 2014–15 | 12 | Newbold-on-Avon | Old Laurentians | Old Leamingtonians, Old Coventrians | |
| 2015–16 | 12 | Banbury | Earlsdon | Droitwich, Bedworth | |
| 2016–17 | 12 | Rugby Lions | Silhillians | Dunlop (Note: Only 1 team relegated this season, meaning 11th place Nuneaton Old Edwardians survived the drop.) | |
| 2017–18 | 12 | Droitwich | Malvern | Old Yardleians, Berkswell & Balsall | |
| 2018–19 | 12 | Kenilworth | Kidderminster Carolians | Rugby St Andrews, Old Coventrians | |
| 2019–20 | 12 | Stratford-upon-Avon | Malvern | Southam | |
| 2020–21 | 12 | | | | |
Green backgrounds are promotion places.

=== Counties 1 Midlands West (South) (2022– ) ===
Following league reorganisation, Midlands 2 West (South) is renamed Counties 1 Midlands West (South) and continues to be a tier 7 league. Promotion is usually to Regional 2 West Midlands, or occasionally to Regional 2 East Midlands and Regional 2 North Midlands. Relegation is usually to one of the Counties 2 Midlands West leagues.

Counties 1 Midlands West (South)
| Season | No of teams | No of matches | Champions | Runners-up | Relegated team(s) | Ref |
| 2022–23 | 12 | 22 | Berkswell & Balsall | Kidderminster Carolians | Barkers Butts (11th) and Coventry Welsh (12th) | |
| 2023–24 | 12 | 22 | Luctonians II | Ledbury | Broadstreet (11th) and Earlsdon (12th) | |
| 2024–25 | 12 | 22 | Luctonians II | Old Coventrians | Barkers Butts (11th) and Bromsgrove (12th) | |
Green background is the promotion place.

== Promotion play-offs ==
Between 2000–01 and 2018–19 seasons there was a play-off between the runners-up of Midlands 2 West (North) and Midlands 2 West (South) for the third and final promotion place to Midlands 1 West (aside from 2008–09 which was played between the runners-up of Midlands 2 West (South) and Midlands 2 East (North) due to RFU restructuring). The team with the superior league record had home advantage in the tie. At the end of the 2019–20 season the Midlands 2 West (South) teams had ten wins to Midlands 2 West (North) teams eight; and the home team won promotion on eleven occasions compared to the away teams seven.

Midlands 2 West (North) v Midlands 2 West (South) promotion play-off results
| Season | Home team | Score | Away team | Venue | Att | Ref |
| 2000–01 | Stafford (N) | 32–10 | Leamington (S) | The County Ground, Stafford, Staffordshire | | |
| 2001–02 | Bedworth (S) | 10–6 | Aston Old Edwardians (N) | Smarts Road, Bedworth, Warwickshire | | |
| 2002–03 | Old Coventrians (S) | 15–17 | Stoke on Trent (N) | Till Hill Lane, Coventry, Warwickshire | | |
| 2003–04 | Sutton Coldfield (N) | 3–37 | Leamington (S) | Roger Smoldon Ground, Sutton Coldfield, West Midlands | | |
| 2004–05 | Newport (Salop) (N) | 25–12 | Pershore (S) | The Old Showground, Newport, Shropshire | | |
| 2005–06 | Bridgnorth (N) | 17–14 | Hereford (S) | Edgar Davis Ground, Bridgnorth, Shropshire | | |
| 2006–07 | Sutton Coldfield (N) | 11–18 | Stratford-upon-Avon (S) | Roger Smoldon Ground, Sutton Coldfield, West Midlands | | |
| 2007–08 | Droitwich (S) | 3–18 | Stoke on Trent (N) | The Glyn Mitchell Memorial Ground, Droitwich Spa, Worcestershire | | |
| 2008–09 | Promotion play-offs different for this season only. See below. (Note: The 2008–09 promotion play-offs were different as the RFU reorganized the leagues across the country including the Midlands Division. Usually the winners of each of the four regional divisions would go up automatically along with two of the runners-up who won their respective play-offs, meaning six teams were promoted. This year one extra was required to be promoted so the top two runners-up by league points – Bourneville (40) and Stewarts & Lloyds (40) went up – leaving the other two runners-up Nuneaton Old Edwardians (34) and Spalding (38) – to compete for the final promotion spot.) | | | | | |
| 2009–10 | Old Saltleians (N) | 12–14 | Old Laurentians (S) | Watton Lane, Water Orton, Warwickshire | | |
| 2010–11 | Bedworth (S) | 15–6 | Old Saltleians (N) | Smarts Road, Bedworth, Warwickshire | | |
| 2011–12 | Old Saltleians (N) | 3–27 | Berkswell & Balsall (S) | Watton Lane, Water Orton, Warwickshire | | |
| 2012–13 | Old Laurentians] (S) | 16–6 | Selly Oak (S) | Fenley Field, Rugby, Warwickshire | | |
| 2013–14 | Crewe & Nantwich (N) | 18–13 | Banbury (S) | Newcastle Road, Nantwich, Cheshire | 500 | |
| 2014–15 | Old Laurentians (S) | 32–23 | Old Saltleians (N) | Fenley Field, Rugby, Warwickshire | 500 | |
| 2015–16 | Earlsdon (S) | 5–20 | Wolverhampton (N) | Mitchell Avenue, Canley, Coventry, West Midlands | | |
| 2016–17 | Camp Hill (N) | 53–0 | Silhillians | Haslucks Green Road, Shirley, Solihull, West Midlands | | |
| 2017–18 | Malvern (S) | 53–12 | Crewe & Nantwich (N) | Spring Lane, Malvern, Worcestershire | | |
| 2018–19 | Kidderminster Carollians (S) | 33–17 | Tamworth (N) | Marlpool Lane, Kidderminster, Worcestershire | 500 | |
| 2019–20 | Cancelled due to the COVID-19 pandemic in the United Kingdom. Best ranked runner-up – Malvern (S) – promoted instead. | | | | | |
| 2020–21 | No play-off due to league reorganisation | | | | | |
Green background is the promoted team. (N) = Midlands 2 West (North) (formerly Midlands 3 West (North)) and (S) = Midlands 2 West (South) (formerly Midlands 3 West (South))

=== 2008–09 promotion play-off ===
As mentioned above the 2008–09 promotion play-offs in Midlands 3 were different due to RFU restructuring for the following season. The two runners-up with the worst league records in the four regional divisions at this level had to face each other for the final promotion spot, with the team with the superior league record having home advantage.

Midlands 2 West (South) v Midlands 2 East (North) promotion play-off results
| Season | Home team | Score | Away team | Venue | Attendance | Ref |
| 2008–09 | Spalding (N) | 12–14 | Nuneaton Old Edwardians (S) | Memorial Field, Spalding, Lincolnshire | | |
Green background is the promoted team. (S) = Midlands 2 West (South) (formerly Midlands 3 West (South) and (N) = Midlands 2 East (North) (formerly Midlands 3 West (North)

== Number of league titles ==
- Updated to 2025.
- Luctonians (3) (Note: Luctonians first title was when the league was known as Midlands West 1; the 2nd XV won the league twice in 2024 and 2025.)
- Barkers Butts (2)
- Kenilworth (2)
- Leamington (2)
- Newbold-on-Avon (2) (Note: One of Newbold-on-Avon's titles was when league was single division known as Midlands West 1.)
- Stratford-upon-Avon (2)
- Sutton Coldfield (2) (Note: One of Sutton Coldfield's titles was when league was single division known as Midlands West 1.)
- Banbury (1)
- Berkswell & Balsall (1)
- Droitwich (1)
- Dunlop (1)
- Earlsdon (1)
- Hereford (1)
- Longton (1) (Note: Longton's title was when league was single division known as Midlands West 1.)
- Malvern (1) (Note: Malvern's title was when league was single division known as Midlands West 1.)
- Newport (Salop) (1) (Note: Newport's (Salop) title was when league was single division known as Midlands West 1.)
- Nuneaton Old Edwardians (1)
- Old Coventrians (1)
- Rugby Lions (1)
- Selly Oak (1) (Note: Selly Oak's title was when league was single division known as Midlands West 1.)
- Solihull (1)
- Willenhall (1) (Note: Willenhall's title was when league was single division known as Midlands West 1.)
- Worcester Wanderers (1)

== See also ==
- Midlands RFU
- North Midlands RFU
- Warwickshire RFU
- English rugby union system
- Rugby union in England
