= Exhall (disambiguation) =

Exhall is a village near Coventry in the United Kingdom. It may also refer to:

- Exhall, Stratford-on-Avon, a village in Warwickshire, UK
- Exhall Grange School, a specialist science college in Exhall, Coventry
- Ash Green School, another school in Exhall, which was briefly renamed Exhall School
- 1949 Exhall mid-air collision, an air crash which occurred near Exhall, Coventry
