= Exhall =

Village in Warwickshire, England

Coordinates: 52.47°N 01.48°W

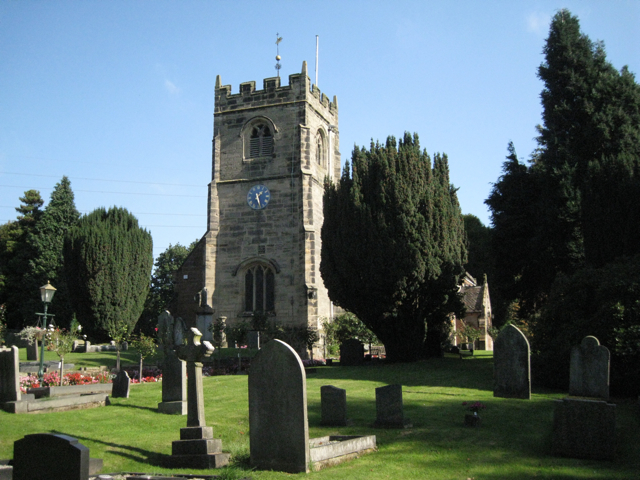
- Church of St Giles

- Location within Warwickshire
- Population: 8,006 (2011.ward)
- OS grid reference: SP353856
- District: Nuneaton and Bedworth
- Shire county: Warwickshire
- Region: West Midlands
- Country: England
- Sovereign state: United Kingdom
- Post town: COVENTRY
- Postcode district: CV6 / CV7
- Dialling code: 024
- Police: Warwickshire
- Fire: Warwickshire
- Ambulance: West Midlands
- UK Parliament: North Warwickshire

Exhall is a suburban village in the Nuneaton and Bedworth borough in Warwickshire, England. It forms part of the Coventry and Bedworth urban area and is contiguous with the Coventry suburb of Longford and the village of Hawkesbury.

== History ==
The toponym of Exhall consists of the Brythonic word *egluɨs (whence egwlys in Welsh) meaning "church", and the Old English halh meaning "valley", as the parish church of St. Giles is situated in the valley of Breach Brook.

Historically, the parish of Exhall (which extends from Black Bank in Bedworth to the north of Holbrooks in Coventry) had no clear centre, instead being composed of a number of hamlets, such as Black Bank, Hayes Green, Exhall Hall Green, Wagon Overthrow, Little Bayton, Ash Green, Neal's Green and Newland. It is also sometimes referred to as Exhall-juxta-Coventry or Exhall near Coventry to distinguish it from the other "Exhall" in Warwickshire (Exhall-juxta-Alcester).

Although Exhall is not mentioned specifically in the Domesday Book, it would have probably formed part of lands owned by Lady Godiva in Ansty and Foleshill. In any case, the parish was probably inhabited from at least the 13th century, as the nave and chancel of St Giles's church appear to date from this period, with the tower added in the 14th century. Although the area remained largely rural until recent times, coal mines were attested from the early 17th century onwards.

During the Industrial Revolution, activities such as coal-mining and brick-making were further developed, leading to an increase in the population of the parish, and consequently the construction of many small houses for workers. These were mainly located along what is now Black Bank/Coventry Road Exhall, in Ash Green and in Goodyers End in Bedworth (part of which is included in the parish of Exhall). In 1868, the main industry in the parish – in common with towns such as Nuneaton and Coventry – was ribbon-making. Saunders Manor was located on the outskirts of Exhall (on the site near Springfield Crescent) before being demolished. From the 1930s onwards, Exhall became more residential in character, with the construction of numerous housing estates, both social (e.g. the Armson Road/Grant Road estate at Hayes Green) and private (e.g. the Cedars Estate). Today the eastern area of Exhall is dominated by the large Bayton Road Industrial Estate which harbours around 200 businesses.

On 19 February 1949 two aircraft collided at 4,500 ft near Exhall. The wreckage fell near an old people's home, the Exhall Lodge Hospital. There were no survivors. In the 1960s, a large industrial estate was created in the east of Exhall, bordering the Coventry-Nuneaton line, at Bayton Road. Other industrial areas were subsequently developed at Black Horse Road and Grovelands (off Longford Road). Today, the name Exhall applies principally to the area immediately south of Bedworth (centred on Black Bank and Coventry Road Exhall), with Ash Green retaining a somewhat separate identity – a fact accentuated by the construction of the Bedworth Bypass (A444) in 1970 and the final section of the M6 motorway in 1971. Even today, Ash Green remains more rural than Exhall, with a number of farms still in operation (e.g. Exhall House Farm, Grange Farm, Newland Hall Farm, Barker's Farm).

== Governance ==
From 1451 to 1842, Exhall was a parish in the Liberty of Coventry, which was geographically in the hundred of Knightlow in the county of Warwickshire, but administratively separate. Following the abolition of the Liberty of Coventry, the city boundary was revised, with Exhall excluded. With the passing of the Local Government Act 1894, which established urban and rural districts in England and Wales, Exhall formed part of the Foleshill Rural District, up until the creation of the Bedworth urban district in 1928, to which it was transferred. In 1931 the parish had a population of 4,426. On 1 April 1932 the parish was abolished and merged with Bedworth and Coventry. Following local government reorganisation in 1974, Bedworth urban district was merged with Nuneaton municipal borough to form the new borough of Nuneaton (renamed Nuneaton & Bedworth in 1980). For electoral purposes, Exhall is split (at both borough and county level) along Black Bank/Coventry Road Exhall/Longford Road.

At borough level, western Exhall is covered by Exhall ward (together with Ash Green and Keresley End), while western Exhall is covered by Poplar ward (together with Coalpit Field and the southern part of Furnace Fields). Each ward is represented by two borough councillors, who are elected for a four-year term by halves. At county level, western Exhall is covered by the Bede division (which also includes the area covered by the borough ward called Bede), while eastern Exhall is covered by the Poplar division (which is identical to the borough ward of the same name). Ash Green and Keresley End, however, are included in the Bedworth West division, along with part of Bedworth Heath and Goodyers End. Each division elects one county councillor for a four-year term.

== Geography ==
Exhall is an area 1.5 miles (2.5 km) south of Bedworth town centre, 4.5 miles (7 km) north-northeast of Coventry and 4.5 miles (7 km) south of Nuneaton. Though contiguous with the Bedworth urban area (and effectively a southern suburb of the town), its post town remains Coventry, given the CV6 and CV7 postcodes. Road signage indicating Exhall is scarce and is only found in and around southern Bedworth.

The population of the ward taken at the 2011 census was 8,006. It is bounded by a disused mineral railway (that used to serve Newdigate Colliery) to the north, the Coventry-Nuneaton Line to the east, Pickards Way (B4113 spur) and the M6 motorway to the south, and Church Lane/Bowling Green Lane and the River Sowe to the west. The area makes up the eastern part of the ecclesiastical parish of Exhall St Giles. However, the parish church of St Giles is located on the northeastern edge of nearby Ash Green (which forms the western part of the parish). The River Sowe and the Coventry Canal are the principal waterways in the area.

== Amenities ==
Exhall has a post office and a number of small shops and pubs, mainly on Black Bank/Coventry Road Exhall, with some local shops on Trelawney Road and Exhall Green/Windmill Road. Bedworth Rugby Football Club has its ground at Rectory Fields (between Rectory Drive and Smarts Road), and there is a large playing field at Heckley Fields (between Heckley Road and Windmill Road).

== Education ==
Educational establishments at Exhall are:

- Exhall Cedars Infant School & Nursery, a state school for pupils aged 2 to 7, in Trenance Road
- St Giles Junior School, a state school for pupils aged 7 to 11, in Hayes Lane
- The Grove Nursery School, a private school for children aged from 2 months to 5 years
- Wheelwright Lane Primary School, a state primary school for pupils aged 4 to 11, in Wheelwright Lane

Before the reorganisation of schools in northern Warwickshire in 1996, there was another school in the area, Exhall First School (on the corner of School Lane and Exhall Green). This school merged with Cedars First School to form Exhall Cedars Infant School (on the Cedars site), and the old Exhall First School building is now a community centre. The secondary school for the area is Ash Green School, In July 2012, the school was formally recognised as a provider for Post 16 education. The Sixth Form Centre opened in September, 2012 and accommodates students studying AS, A Level courses and BTEC courses. Exhall Grange School, a school for students who are visually impaired and have other disabilities, can be found in the area. The school achieved Specialist Science College status in 2003.

Exhall Grange School, a school for students who are visually impaired and have other disabilities, can be found in the area. The school achieved Specialist Science College status in 2003. The neighbouring Warwickshire Academy, which opened in 2022 is a SEND (special educational needs and disabilities school for "young people with Social, Emotional and Mental Health difficulties". From 1946 to 1950 Exhall Training College was a women's college, one of three post-war emergency teacher training colleges. It operated in a disused industrial hostel on a site now occupied by other schools.
