= London Institute for Massage by the Blind =

The London Institute for Massage by the Blind was founded in 1900 in Bayswater, London. It trained blind students in massage. In 1908 it became the National Institute for Massage by the Blind. In 1910 it had 55 masseuses and 27 masseurs on its books.

Its archives are held by the Royal National Institute for the Blind.
