= Warwickshire Vision Support =

- Founded: 1911
- Type: Charity
- VAT ID no.: 6511954
- Registration no.: 1123220
- Headquarters: 14 Market Place, Warwick, CV34 4SL
- Region served: Warwickshire
- Key people: Liz Thiebe (Chair); Keith Eales (CEO)
- Website: warwickshire.vision

Warwickshire Vision Support (formerly known as Warwickshire Association for the Blind) is a registered charity in England providing rehabilitation services for adults with visual impairments to enable them to live independently.

Services are provided by Warwickshire Vision Support's rehabilitation team at offices in Warwick.

== History ==
The Warwickshire Association for the Blind was founded in 1911 with the aim of preventing blindness and helping blind people in Warwickshire to promote their welfare.

One of the first tasks was to conduct a survey to determine the number of blind people living in the county. A limited number of parishioners gave a figure of 250. The founding meeting of the Association was chaired by Lord Algernon Percy, High Sheriff of Warwickshire, and a former Conservative MP. He spoke of the difficulties blind people had in finding work, while other members called for greater support equal to that in other parts of the country.

In 1925, the charity entered into a partnership with Warwickshire County Council under which the first home teacher was recruited to visit and teach blind children throughout the county. With the introduction of the Disabled Persons (Employment) Act 1944, the Association began to encourage non-disabled blind people to register for employment, and by 1945 the charity was running centers throughout the county, which at that time included Leamington, Shirley, Sutton Coldfield and Tamworth. In 1950, the organization purchased Huntley Lodge in Leamington Spa and developed it into a home for twenty-two elderly blind people. The lodge was managed by Warwickshire County Council until 1980. It was then sold and the proceeds from the sale donated to the charity.

A 1991 report by the Royal National Institute for the Blind indicated that the number of visually impaired people was far greater than previously thought. In response, the Association developed a new strategy to cover the increased number of people for whom it needed to provide services. It also formalized its partnership with Warwickshire Social Services and delegated the task of registering blind and partially sighted people to the charity.

The Association underwent a major restructuring program in 2004 due to changes in financial regulations and became a limited liability company in 2008. In 2011, the Warwickshire Association for the Blind had more than 4,000 people on its database, 2,800 of whom were registered with some form of visual impairment The organization celebrated its centenary in 2011 with a re-enactment of the first meeting at Leamington Town Hall. There was also an art exhibition at Leamington Art Gallery.

In 2014, the Warwickshire Association for the Blind changed its operational name to Warwickshire Vision Support.

== Current services ==
=== Help and advice ===
Warwickshire Vision Support operates a general helpline for members and their carers and families. There is also a Vision Support Desk at Warwick Hospital.

=== Clubs and drop-in centres ===
WVS maintains 14 clubs for its members throughout Warwickshire. The charity has also set up seven drop-in centres to make its facilities and services more accessible to the public.

=== Home Visitor Service ===
WVS provides a home visiting service where volunteers visit visually impaired members to help them read or help with correspondence.

=== Rehabilitation and Registration ===
WVS has a team of rehabilitation officers who help people with visual impairments adapt to the challenges of having limited vision. This includes aspects such as the person's mobility, cooking, reading, writing or using the telephone. The rehabilitation service is provided by WVS on behalf of Warwickshire County Council, Adult Health & Community Services (formerly Social Services).

=== Interactive Technology Service ===
The Interactive Technology Support Service provides an introduction to new digital technologies (computers, tablets, and smartphones).

=== Shopping Service ===
Since February 2014, the Shoppa Hoppa service has provided sighted people with transportation and sighted companions to help them store. The program is operated in partnership with Back & 4th Community Transport.

=== My Guide Service ===
Since 2014, the My Guide Service has been helping visually impaired people leave their homes and find their way around the local community by providing volunteer sighted guides.

=== Talking books and newspapers ===
The De Montfort Talking Book Service is an independent charity providing books in cassette form to blind and partially sighted people in Warwickshire. The service has been run by volunteers since April 2010. Previously it was run by WVS in partnership with Warwickshire County Council, known as the Warwickshire Talking Book Service. The books are provided free of charge to members.

Free talking newspapers are also available. These provide local news taken from sources such as newspapers and magazines. In addition, the Warwickshire Association for the Blind publishes a magazine for its members covering WVS and other topics of interest. WVS magazine (Warwickshire Vision) is published three times a year and is available in large print, Braille, and audio formats.

=== Visual Impairment Awareness ===
To help businesses and organizations comply with the Disability Discrimination Act, WVS provides both formal training and informal presentations to organizations and community groups.

== Funding ==
Although WVS has received funding from local authorities, the organization relies on donations from public, business and foundation sources to fund its work. Up to one-third of its income comes from these voluntary sources.

== Awards ==
=== Queen's Award for Voluntary Service ===
In June 2020, WVS was one of the organizations honored with the Queen's Award for Voluntary Service, the highest award given to a volunteer group in the United Kingdom. It was one of two organizations in Warwickshire to receive the award that year.

=== Awards given by WVS ===
Each year, WVS presents awards to individuals and organizations that they believe have made a significant contribution to promoting a better understanding of visual impairment. These include the George Marshall Trophy, awarded to an organization or individual who has made a significant contribution to the lives of visually impaired people, and the Viv Bradford Rose Bowl, awarded to an individual who has distinguished themselves through their efforts and achievements in overcoming the barriers of visual impairment. Recipients of the Viv Bradford trophy include BBC Radio 4 presenter Peter White, who received the award in 2002. In 2019, Warwickshire Vision established the Volunteer Excellence Award to recognize the work of its volunteers.
