= Ash Green =

Ash Green can refer to:

- Ash Green, Surrey, England
- Ash Green, Warwickshire, England

== See also ==
- Eight Ash Green, Essex, England
- New Ash Green, Kent, England
