= Ash Green, Warwickshire =

Village in Warwickshire, England

Coordinates: 52.46°N 01.51°W

Ash Green
- Location within Warwickshire
- OS grid reference: SP335845
- District: Nuneaton and Bedworth
- Shire county: Warwickshire
- Region: West Midlands
- Country: England
- Sovereign state: United Kingdom
- Post town: COVENTRY
- Postcode district: CV7
- Dialling code: 024
- Police: Warwickshire
- Fire: Warwickshire
- Ambulance: West Midlands
- UK Parliament: North Warwickshire

Ash Green is a village in the Nuneaton and Bedworth borough of Warwickshire, England. It forms part of the Coventry and Bedworth urban area.

== Geography ==
Ash Green is 2.5 miles (4.0 km) south-southeast of Bedworth and 4 miles (6.4 km) north of Coventry. It is bounded by the M6 motorway to the north, the A444 (Phoenix Way) to the east, Winding House Lane/Central Boulevard to the south and Keresley End (also known as Keresley Newlands) to the west. The area makes up the western part of the ecclesiastical parish of Exhall St Giles (which extends from Black Bank in Bedworth to the north of Holbrooks in Coventry). The parish church of St Giles is on the northeastern edge of Ash Green, in Church Lane, near the junction with St Giles Road (which was known as Dead Lane in pre-Victorian times, as it was the route taken by funeral cortèges).

Although Ash Green was for centuries a hamlet centred on the crossroads formed by Royal Oak Lane, Vicarage Lane, Ash Green Lane and New Road, it expanded throughout the course of the 20th century to the west and south to absorb the nearby hamlets of Newland (which now exists only in the names Newland Lane and Newland Hall Farm) and Neal's Green, as testified by the "Ash Green" signs erected on New Road (near Haven Nursing Home) and at the junction of Wheelwright Lane and Winding House Lane. Although Neal's Green still appears on some maps, it is a name that is now used very seldom by locals. The Breach Brook and the River Sowe are the principal waterways in the area.

Today, Ash Green forms part of the Coventry/Bedworth Urban Area, the conurbation that includes Coventry and Bedworth, and is in many regards an outer suburb of Coventry (as reflected by its inclusion in the Coventry post town). Indeed, the Coventry city boundary lies immediately south of Ash Green along the former colliery railway line (adjacent to Winding House Lane and Central Boulevard), and the settlement of Ash Green is essentially contiguous with the Holbrooks district of Coventry.

== History ==
Historically, Ash Green was a hamlet in the parish of Exhall. Its history is therefore closely linked with that of the rest of the parish. Of particular note in Ash Green is the parish church, parts of which date back to the 13th and 14th centuries (namely the nave, chancel and tower). Newland Hall Farm, built between the 15th and 18th centuries. Exhall House, which dates from the 18th century and formerly Exhall Grange, a mainly 18th-century building with some elements that probably date from the 16th century.

== Local government ==
From 1451 to 1842, Ash Green, like the rest of the parish of Exhall, formed part of the Liberty of Coventry, which was geographically in the hundred of Knightlow in the county of Warwickshire, but administratively separate. Following the abolition of the Liberty of Coventry, the city boundary was revised, with the parish of Exhall (and therefore Ash Green) excluded. With the passing of the Local Government Act 1894, which established urban and rural districts in England and Wales, Ash Green formed part of the Foleshill Rural District, up until the creation of the Bedworth urban district in 1928, to which it was transferred.

Following local government reorganisation in 1974, Bedworth urban district was merged with Nuneaton municipal borough to form the new borough of Nuneaton (renamed Nuneaton & Bedworth in 1980). For electoral purposes, at the borough level, Ash Green is covered by Exhall ward (together with western Exhall and Keresley End). The ward is represented by two borough councillors, who are elected for a four-year term by halves. At Warwickshire county level, however, Ash Green is included in the Bedworth West division, along with Keresley End, part of Bedworth Heath and Goodyers End. The division elects one county councillor for a four-year term.

== Amenities ==
Ash Green has a post office and convenience store (in Ash Green Lane), 2 pubs (The Bull & Anchor in Wheelwright Lane & The Royal Oak, Royal Oak Lane). It also has a Primary School, Wheelwright Lane and a school registered for RNIB, Pears Centre. It also has the children's hospice called Zoe's Place. A double-glazing firm, Charlies Windows on Ash Green Lane. There is a car sales/repair establishments (in Wheelwright Lane, Chana Cars). Until 2003–04, there was a social club in Ash Green Lane. The area also benefits from a number of playing fields, including a play area for small children, in Vicarage Lane & New Road.

== Education ==
Pears Centre was an independent RNIB school for pupils aged 4 to 19, adjacent to (and in buildings formerly occupied by) Exhall Grange School, in Wheelwright Lane. The school closed in 2018. There are three educational establishments in Ash Green:

- Wheelwright Lane Primary School, a state primary school for pupils aged 4 to 11, in Wheelwright Lane;
- Ash Green School, a state secondary school with foundation status for pupils aged 11 to 16, in Ash Green Lane;
- Exhall Grange School, a state special school for pupils aged 2 to 19, in Easter Way;
