= RNIB Pears Centre for Specialist Learning =

Former special school in Warwickshire, England

Location
- Wheelwright Lane; Ash Green near Coventry, Warwickshire, CV7 9RA; England; 52.4561°N 1.5066°W

Information
- Former name: Rushton Hall School
- Type: Special school
- Established: 1957
- Closed: 7 November 2018
- Department for Education URN: 122155 Tables
- Ofsted: Reports
- Gender: Coeducational
- Age: 2 to 19

RNIB Pears Centre for Specialist Learning, formerly Rushton Hall School, was a school and children’s home for young people who were blind or partially sighted and who also had multiple disabilities or complex needs such as severe or profound learning disabilities, physical disabilities, additional sensory impairment, healthcare needs and autistic spectrum disorders. The school, based just outside Coventry, was run by RNIB (Royal National Institute of Blind People).

RNIB Pears Centre was categorised by Ofsted as a special, non-maintained school for 2- to 19-year-olds and as a children's home. Each service was inspected separately by Ofsted. The children's home was rated as "Outstanding" by Ofsted in November 2011. The school also achieved an "Outstanding" Ofsted grading in February 2013, but in November 2017 it was graded as "Inadequate".

The Charity Commission for England and Wales launched an inquiry into the school in 2018 following a sexual abuse allegation. Its report, published in 2020 after a two-year investigation, described a "catalogue of serious failings" at the school and said that "This is one of the worst examples we have uncovered of poor governance and oversight having a direct impact on vulnerable people".

On 4 September 2018 RNIB announced that both the children's home and school would close; the closure took place on 7 November 2018.

== History ==
The school was founded in 1957, at Rushton Hall in Northamptonshire. In 2002, it moved to a shared site with Exhall Grange School in Coventry.

From 2009 to 2012 the entire school site was redeveloped, creating a new school building, five new bungalows and a new reception/administration building.

In May 2011, Rushton School and Children's Home was renamed RNIB Pears Centre for Specialist Learning, in recognition of the Pears Foundation's investment of £1.1 million towards the redevelopment work.

Anne, Princess Royal reopened the renamed school on 13 September 2012.

== Charity Commission inquiry ==
The Charity Commission for England and Wales made a two-year inquiry, starting in March 2018, into the residential school after allegations of sexually abusive practice. The Commission's report found that the institution had exposed vulnerable children to harm and said that it was "one of the worst examples" it had ever uncovered. It also said that the RNIB-run school's failings had a serious impact on vulnerable people and recorded several cases of distress and harm to young disabled children.

RNIB said it had attempted to "turn the service around" after the Commission published its report.

When the Commission published its report, RNIB issued an apology, saying that the findings "represent(s) a low point in our 152-year history". The findings included a child whose feet were injured because they wore shoes that were too small for three months. Moreover, the inquiry found a "disproportionately high number of basic medication errors" with one epileptic child suffering an increase in seizures. It also found that the school failed to document physical restraint incidents.

== See also ==
- Royal National Institute of Blind People
