= Miners' Welfare Park =

Park in Bedworth, England

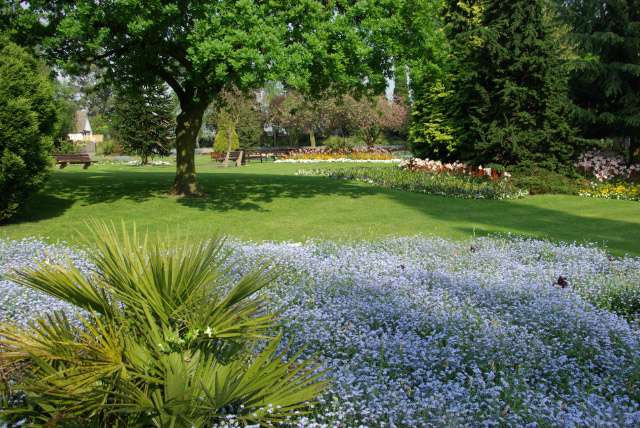
- Interactive map of Miners' Welfare Park
- Type: Urban Park
- Location: Bedworth, Warwickshire, England
- Coordinates: 52.4747°N 1.4731°W
- Operator: Nuneaton and Bedworth Borough Council
- Open: All year
- Website: Official website

Miners' Welfare Park is an urban park in Bedworth, Warwickshire, England.

== History ==
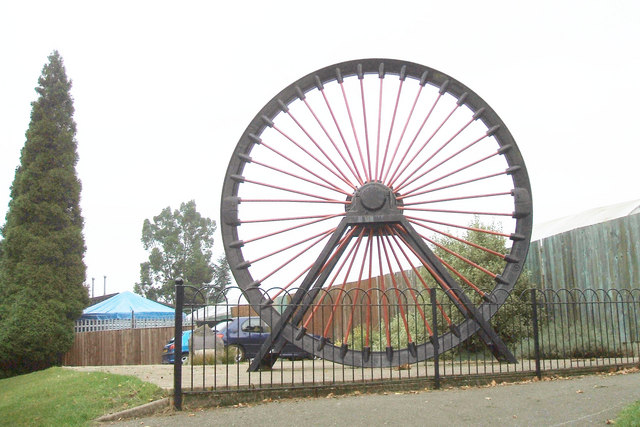
The winding wheel tribute to the miners

This park was originally purchased by Bedworth Miners' Welfare Committee in 1921 to offer recreation to the miners and their families. A winding wheel was erected in the park as a tribute to the miners in 1986. In 2000, it won 'Best Park in the UK' in the Britain in Bloom competition. It is now managed by Nuneaton and Bedworth Borough Council.

== Facilities ==
There is a children's play area with a water splash area, a sand pit and a green play area for sensory play. There are formal gardens, outdoor gym, disc golf, walking paths, cricket, football, pitch and putt golf, bowls, a lake, pond and wildflower area. Bedworth leisure centre is at the park offering a swimming pool, gym and other indoor sport activities. Bedworth Parkrun takes place every Saturday morning at 9am, the course is five kilometres (3.1 mi) in length and run on a mixture of footpaths. The Skate park was removed in 2023, due to health concerns. The park boasts a Mountain Bike trail, accessible for a variety of age groups and skill levels.
