= Anna Lawson =

British legal scholar (born 1966)

Anna Lawson FBA FAcSS
- Born: 1966 (age 59–60); Holyhead, Wales

Academic background
- Education: University of Leeds; Jesus College, Oxford

Academic work
- Discipline: Legal scholar
- Sub-discipline: Equality law; disability rights; international human rights
- Institutions: University of Leeds

Anna Lawson, FBA, FAcSS (born 1966) is a British legal scholar specialising in disability and law. Since 2013, she has been Professor of Law at the University of Leeds. She was additionally joint director of the university's Centre for Disability Studies from 2015 to 2023. She has also served as a special advisor to the House of Commons' Women and Equalities Committee and an expert advisor to the Council of Europe. Lawson is the patron of the National Association of Disabled Staff Networks (NADSN).

== Early life and education ==
Lawson was born in 1966 in Holyhead, North Wales. She is blind, having lost her sight through macular degeneration between the ages fo 7 and 25, and was educated at Exhall Grange, a specialist school for visually impaired pupils. She has a Bachelor of Law (LLB) degree from the University of Leeds, and a postgraduate Bachelor of Civil Laws (BCL) degree from Jesus College, Oxford. She was also awarded a Doctor of Philosophy (PhD) degree by the University of Leeds in 2015; her PhD was awarded by published work, rather than for a doctoral thesis.

== Honours ==
On 28 November 2017, Lawson was made an honorary bencher of Middle Temple. In July 2022, she was elected Fellow of the British Academy (FBA), the United Kingdom's national academy for the humanities and social sciences. She is also an elected Fellow of the Academy of Social Sciences (FAcSS).

== Selected works ==
- Lawson, Anna; Gooding, Caroline, eds. (2005). Disability rights in Europe: from theory to practice. Oxford: Hart Publishing. ISBN 978-1841134864.
- Lawson, Anna (2008). Disability and equality law in Britain: the role of reasonable adjustment. Oxford: Hart Publishing. ISBN 978-1841138282.
- Lawson, Anna; Schiek, Dagmar, eds. (2011). European Union non-discrimination law and intersectionality: investigating the triangle of racial, gender and disability discrimination. Farnham: Ashgate. ISBN 978-0754679806.
- Waddington, Lisa; Lawson, Anna, eds. (2018). The UN Convention on the Rights of Persons with Disabilities in practice: a comparative analysis of the role of courts. Oxford: Oxford University Press. ISBN 978-0198786627.
