= George H. Marshall =

British schoolteacher, head master, author, academic and campaigner

George Marshall OBE

Headmaster of Exhall Grange School
- In office 1 May 1953 – 22 June 1981
- Preceded by: Mollie Caborne
- Succeeded by: Richard Bignell

Personal details
- Born: George Harold Marshall; 17 June 1916
- Died: 4 October 1984 (aged 68)

George Harold Marshall OBE (17 June 1916 – 4 October 1984) was a British schoolteacher, principal, author, academic, and campaigner, internationally recognised for his work in the fields of education and assistive technology for children with visual disabilities. Marshall started Exhall Grange, Britain's first school to cater specifically for partially sighted children in 1951, becoming the third and was its head master from 1953 until he retired in 1981, making him to date the longest-serving person to hold that position. He also founded The Partially Sighted Society.

== Career ==
Having taught at Stockingford County School in Nuneaton, in 1951 Marshall was one of the founders of Exhall Grange School, a boarding school based near Coventry, and the first purpose-built school for partially sighted children to be opened in the United Kingdom. He served as deputy headmaster from 1951 to 1953, then became headmaster in 1953, a job he held until his retirement in 1981. He was the first of two headteachers of the school to have been deputy head before becoming the actual, when the preceder left; the other being the current Head, Christine Marshall. During his time at the school Marshall earned a national and international reputation as a campaigner for people with visual impairment, and a leading expert on the education of partially sighted children. His work includes developing prototype models of equipment, notably low vision aids, to help children with limited vision to read printed text, which were subsequently adopted by manufacturers. He was also regarded as a leading expert on matters relating to visual disability and eye conditions, publishing three books and over 40 pamphlets relating to the subject, explaining them in simple terms after identifying a need for parents with visually impaired children to have access to more information about their eye condition.

Marshall was chairman of the College of Teachers of the Blind, and executive officer of the Disabled Living Foundation. He was also a member of the Government Committee of Inquiry into the Education of the Visually Handicapped, and a committee member of the International Conference for Education. He was an adviser on teaching visually impaired students in Hong Kong, China and Malaysia, and presented several papers on the subject. In 1975 he attended the Pan Pacific Rehabilitation Conference in Singapore.

He also founded The Partially Sighted Society (PSS) after encouraging parents to seek help and advice for their children on matters relating to visual aids, and education and career opportunities. The PSS provides help, information and advice for anyone with limited vision. During the 1950s and 1960s Marshall invited artists to work with children from Exhall Grange to encourage them to develop an appreciation of art, and several sculptures were commissioned by him. In 2009 a sculpture created for the school by Barbara Hepworth in 1964 sold at auction for £37,200. George Marshall was awarded the OBE in the 1977 New Year Honours.

Following his retirement in 1981, George Marshall became involved with Warwickshire Association for the Blind, and as part of his work for them held regular workshops that enabled the Association's clientele to learn about the visual aids which were available to them. He also chaired their Appeals Committee which was raising funds for the construction of a new resource centre in Warwick, and was appointed the organisation's vice chairman in 1983.

== Death and legacy ==
George Marshall died on 4 October 1984 as a result of an ongoing chest complaint. In 1999 former students at Exhall Grange paid for the construction of a permanent memorial at the school dedicated to Marshall. He was also honoured by Warwickshire Association for the Blind, who named their resource centre The George Marshall Centre in recognition of his progressive approach in helping blind and partially sighted people. The organisation was based at the centre until 2009 when it moved to new premises. Warwickshire Association for the Blind also awards a George Marshall Trophy, an annual prize presented to an individual or organisation that has made a significant contribution towards helping visually impaired people.

== Bibliography ==
- The Challenge of a Handicap (1976) ISBN 0-86240-001-5
- The Eyes and Vision (1979) ISBN 0-86238-403-6
- Vision: Eye and Its Aberrations and Diseases in Middle and Old Age (1981) ISBN 0-86240-002-3

Preceded by Mollie Caborne	Headteacher of Exhall Grange School; 1 May 1953 – 22 June 1981	Succeeded by Richard Bignell
