= Keresley End =

Village in Warwickshire, England

Coordinates: 52.459°N 1.535°W

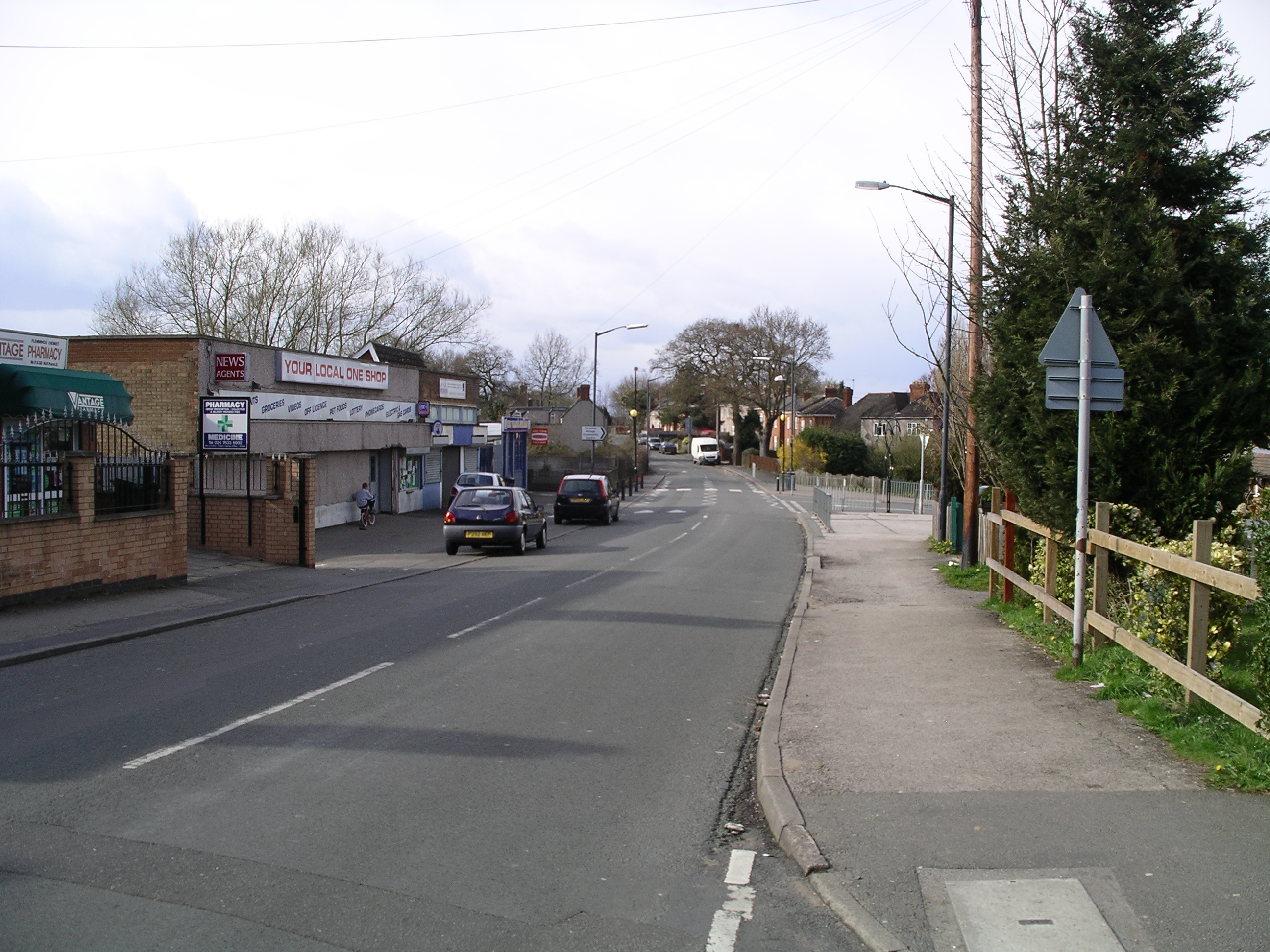
Bennetts Rd North in Keresley End

Keresley End is a village in the Nuneaton & Bedworth District of Warwickshire, England, also known as Keresley Village or Keresley Newlands. Population details can be found under Exhall. It is situated approximately 1.5 km north of Keresley, an outer suburb of Coventry, and, being close to the former Keresley colliery, it was where many coal miners lived.

== History ==
Keresley End was a pit village which began to develop in the early 1900s, when the first mine shaft was created. There was a hut opposite the pit, on Bennett's Road, which was a dormitory for coal miners travelling to the site (later donated to St Thomas's Church and used as a mission church for the village). The village grew from a few houses built for miners and their families, to the village of today, over the century, with many houses constructed by the mine company. In 1954, the development around Howat Road was built by Bedworth Urban District Council. Around that time, the infant and junior schools were also built, followed by the senior school in Grove Lane. This has since been demolished and a small housing estate was built in its place in the late 1990s. The mine closed in the 1980s and the site has since been turned over to distribution (ProLogis Park) and housing.

During this period, the village had several shops. Jilks' general stores (run by Mr & Mrs Jilks) was on the corner of Thompson's Road and Bennett's Road North; the window facing onto Bennett's Road was full of sweets of all varieties. Further down the road, opposite Howat Road, was the Co-op, the Co-op butchers and a fish and chip shop. Down in the village was a set of shops which included the post office, a chemist's, a toy shop, a wool shop and other general stores. There were two houses that had lean-tos used for small retail sales – one in Thompson's Road and one near the pit on Bennett's Road North.
