= Exhall Grange School =

Special school in Ash Green, Warwickshire, England

Coordinates: 52°27′21″N 1°30′22″W

Location
- Easter Way; Ash Green; Coventry, Warwickshire, CV7 9HP; England

Information
- Type: Community special school
- Established: 1951
- Local authority: Warwickshire County Council
- Department for Education URN: 125794 Tables
- Ofsted: Reports
- Head teacher: Helen Seickell
- Staff: 130 (approx.)
- Gender: Coeducational
- Age: 4 to 19
- Enrolment: 260 (approx.)
- Houses: Easter; Edison; Hawking; Ingram
- Colours: Pink; Green; Orange; Purple
- Website: http://www.exhallgrange.org.uk/

Exhall Grange School is a special school located in Ash Green just outside Coventry in Warwickshire, England. The school meets the needs of children and young people age from 4 to 19 years with physical disability, visual impairment, complex medical needs, and social, communication and interaction difficulties.

Opened in 1951 as a school for visually impaired pupils, Exhall Grange was the first school to cater exclusively for partially sighted children. It later widened its remit to include pupils with other disabilities, and became a grammar school in 1960.

The school was a boarding school for many years, but significantly reduced its boarding facilities during the 1990s and 2000s as its role as a special school changed, and it is now a day school. In 2001 Exhall Grange began to share its campus with RNIB Pears Centre for Specialist Learning (then known as RNIB Rushton School and Children's Home), an RNIB school which relocated there from Northamptonshire. In 2018, the RNIB centre was closed by Ofsted after being rated inadequate, as well as being closed over claims of staff not being able to safeguard the children there properly. In May 2022, a new school called the Warwickshire Academy was built in its place. Zoe's Place Baby Hospice, a children's hospice also occupies part of the site. Exhall Grange was the first special school to be awarded science college status in 2003, and celebrated its Gold, Diamond & Platinum Jubilee years in 2001, 2011 and 2021 respectively.

== History ==
=== Early years ===
Exhall Grange School was established in 1951 on the site of a former Second World War army base, and began life with twelve pupils. The school originally specialised in teaching pupils with visual impairment, and was the first purpose-built school for partially sighted children to be opened in the United Kingdom. Among its features was specially designed lighting to help pupils read and navigate their way around more easily. The school later began to extend its facilities and to enrol students with other disabilities, while in 1960 a grammar school department was added to enable disabled students from across the United Kingdom to attain a grammar school level of education. It was, for many years, predominantly a boarding school with pupils attending from across the United Kingdom, and it was regarded as being among the best in its field.

Its reputation as a leading school for educating visually impaired students was established by its then headmaster, George Marshall. The concept of Exhall Grange had originally been his, and he was one of its founding members of staff. After a brief spell as deputy head, he became head in 1953. Marshall would later achieve international recognition for his expertise on the education and welfare of those with sight loss, and received the OBE in 1976. Also in 1976 the school celebrated its Silver Jubilee. In 1999 former students from the school paid for a plaque to be dedicated to him at Exhall Grange.

The school underwent an extensive redevelopment programme during the 1960s, which saw many of the original structures replaced with modern buildings. George Marshall also invited artists to work with children from Exhall Grange to encourage them to develop an appreciation of art, and several sculptures were commissioned by him. In 2009 a sculpture created for the school by Barbara Hepworth in 1964 sold at auction for £37,200.

Following George Marshall's retirement in 1981, he was succeeded as headmaster by Richard Bignell. Bignell – himself visually impaired – recognised the benefits for the school and its students of using computer technology in a teaching environment. During the 1980s Exhall Grange became an early user of the Vincent Workstation, a system that enabled braille to be translated into speech and printed text. Bignell continued to raise the school's profile throughout his tenure as its headmaster, building on the work of his predecessor. He made significant changes to the style of education it offered, moving away from the grammar-school based system so that pupils began to study the same curriculum offered by mainstream comprehensive schools. He retired in 2005.

In 1985 British Prime Minister Margaret Thatcher apologised to the school after mistakenly criticising members of its teaching staff who belonged to the National Union of Teachers for taking strike action. It was NUT members at the nearby Exhall School who had struck. In a House of Commons statement on 18 March, Thatcher said, "I very much regret any embarrassment or offence to the teachers of this school which may have followed from my statement last Thursday. The misunderstanding arose because publicity material from the National Union of Teachers was in error. It was Exhall school which was affected; Exhall Grange school was not."

=== Changing role ===
In 1985 Exhall Grange was the largest school for visually impaired students in the United Kingdom, but in more recent years, a greater number of children with single disabilities have gradually been included in mainstream education, and Exhall Grange's role as a special school has adapted as a consequence. Many of its students now have multiple disabilities, while the residential facilities were phased out over the 1990s and 2000s. The school now caters largely for pupils living in the local vicinity, with the main catchment area being the northern part of Warwickshire, including Bedworth and Nuneaton. Although it has a Coventry postal address, it is under the control of Warwickshire Education Authority.

In 1998, following an inspection from the Office for Standards in Education (OFSTED), the school was awarded Beacon status. OFSTED gave Exhall Grange outstanding report in March 2009.

In 2001 the school celebrated its Golden Jubilee. A special book by David Howe was published; titled, Exhall Grange School: The First Fifty years.

In June 2002, RNIB Pears Centre for Specialist Learning (then known as RNIB Rushton School and Children's Home), an RNIB school based in Kettering, Northamptonshire, relocated to the Exhall Grange campus. However, the two schools remain independent organizations. Also in 2002, researchers from the University of Warwick worked with pupils at the school in a series of experiments that involved using ferrets to help discover how blind children perceive space.

In July 2003, Exhall Grange became the first special school to achieve specialist science college status. It was redesignated as a science college in November 2007, and in September 2008 was granted special educational needs (physical and sensory) specialist status.

In 2004 a syndicate of dinner ladies at the school won £2.4 million on the National Lottery draw.

March 2007 saw the commencement of a three-year building and modernisation programme to improve the overall condition of the school. In 2009 the school opened a new gymnasium and the old gym was demolished. Permission for a new gym had been granted in 1999, and the school launched a £1.5 million appeal to build it.

In June 2009 work got under way on building the region's first hospice dedicated to the care of young children. Zoe's Place would offer one-to-one palliative and respite care, and terminal care for children up to the age of five who have life-limiting illnesses and special complex needs. An appeal to raise £650,000 to help fund the building of the hospice was launched in March 2008, and it was scheduled to open in Spring 2010.

In Autumn 2009 a coach hired by Exhall Grange for a student trip to France was targeted by two Afghan teenage stowaways as the school party prepared to return to the United Kingdom. The boys crawled into the coach's engine while the vehicle was parked in a supermarket car park in Calais, but the duo were discovered by the driver and absconded.

A new headteacher, Christine Marshall, was appointed in 2011 alongside the school celebrating its Diamond Jubilee in 2011. Many celebrations happened, including the burying of a time capsule in the school grounds during the summer term, and a Celebration Day which saw Staff, students and past students held a 1950s-style street party to celebrate the school's 60th anniversary.

== House system ==
=== Past ===
In its days as a boarding school pupils at Exhall Grange were placed into one of six houses, each of which had approximately 50 boarding and day pupils ranging in age from 5 to 18. After the rebuilding programme, the school was unusual in that all meals were taken in houses, as opposed to a central dining system; however, prior to this, there was a central kitchen and dining room, with two meal sittings. The boys' houses were named Canterbury, Lancaster, Warwick and Windsor. The girls' houses were Avon and Kenilworth. A seventh house, York House, was originally also a boys' house, but was closed as part of the rebuilding logistics, and the boys were distributed between the remaining four. An eighth house, Malvern, was used for staff accommodation.

Beginning in September 1988 the house system was changed so that pupils were accommodated in various age groups. Canterbury and Lancaster housed juniors and those in the first, second and third years. Warwick housed fourth and fifth year pupils and Windsor accommodated boys from the sixth form. Avon and Kenilworth became Avon Junior and Avon Senior. Three superhouses were then created for the purpose of sporting activities. These were named Phoenix, Wyvern and Yale.

As the school's role changed during the 1990s and 2000s, much of the boarding accommodation was gradually phased out. Warwick and Windsor were the first houses to close in the early 1990s, followed later by Avon. Lancaster and Canterbury (by then known collectively as Lancaster) were the final houses to close when the school ceased to be a boarding school in 2004. The only boarding accommodation offered on the site now is at Rushton Hall.

=== Present ===
Today the houses are Easter; Pink, Edison; Green, Hawking; Orange and Ingram; Purple. They are named after people; Melanie Easter, Thomas Edison, Stephen Hawking and Sam Ingram.

== Notable people ==
=== Heads of school ===
There have been seven head masters/mistresses of Exhall Grange.

Name	Time
Dr George Highmore	1951
Mollie Caborne	1951–1953
George Marshall OBE	1953–1981
Richard Bignell	1981–2005
John Truman	2005–2010
Christine Marshall	2010–2011 (acting); 2011–2022
Helen Seickell	Since 2022

=== Notable pupils ===
- Melanie Easter, Paralympic swimmer
- Anthony Hamilton, athlete who won gold in the 800m and 1500m at the 1988 Paralympic Games.
- Sam Ingram, Paralympic judo competitor
- Ryan Kelly, actor who plays the role of Jack 'Jazzer' McCreary in Radio 4's The Archers.
- Anna Lawson, legal scholar
- Noel Thatcher, Paralympic athlete

== See also ==
- Jordanstown Schools
- New College Worcester
- Royal Blind School
