= Action for Blind People =

British charity

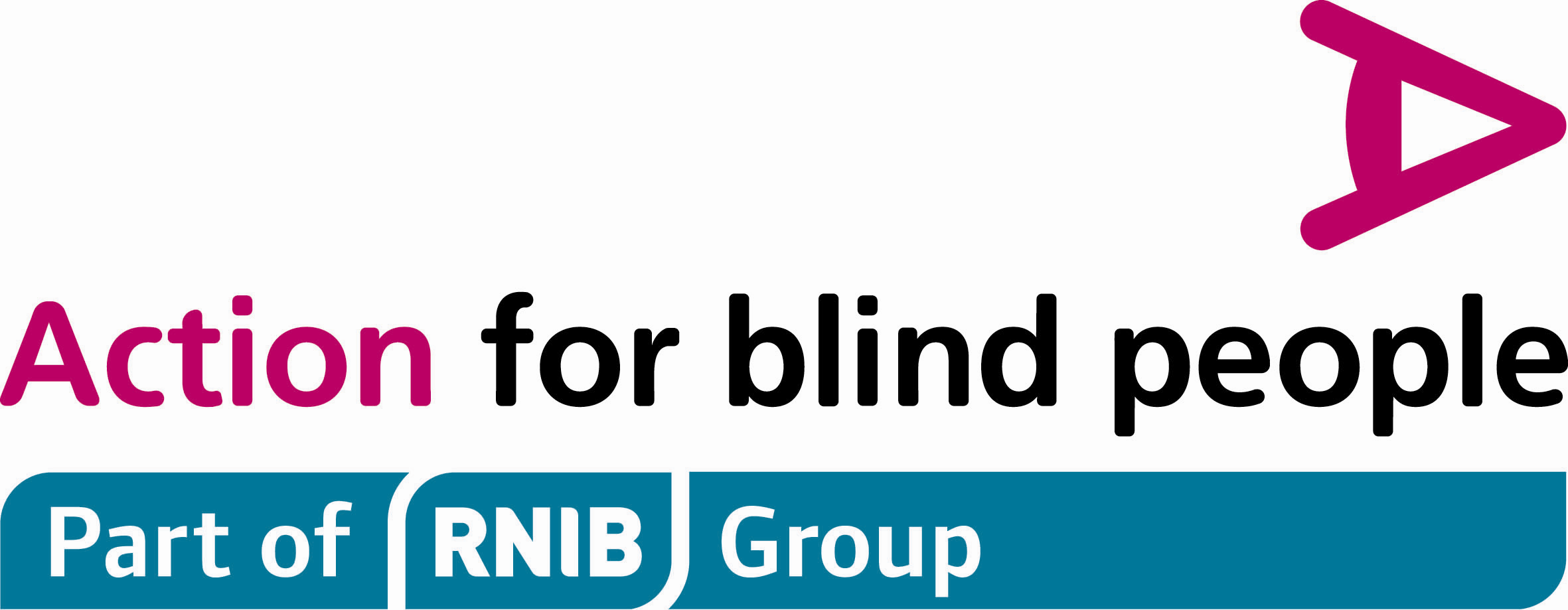
- Merged into: Royal National Institute of Blind People
- Formation: 1857
- Dissolved: 2017
- Headquarters: United Kingdom
- Website: http://www.actionforblindpeople.org.uk Archived

Action for Blind People was a national sight loss charity in the United Kingdom, that provided help and support to blind and partially sighted people of all ages. In 2017 the organisation merged with the Royal National Institute of Blind People (RNIB) with which it had been in a partnership since 2009.

== History ==
Action for Blind People was founded in 1857 as the Surrey Association for the General Welfare of the Blind and later became the London Association for the Blind. The Association's main activities in the early days were teaching blind people to read and to learn practical trades. Opportunities and attitudes towards blind and partially sighted people have changed over the years, along with the nature and the scale of the Association's work. As a result, their title was changed to Action for Blind People in 1991.

== RNIB Group ==
Action for Blind People formed a partnership with the Royal National Institute of Blind People (RNIB) in April 2009 and became part of RNIB Group.

This enabled both organisations to cooperate with helping the increasing number of people with sight loss. This partnership allowed both organisations to share skills and deliver services in line with the UK Vision Strategy and RNIB Group Strategy.

== Organization ==
Action had 17 regional teams across England and four Resource Centres. Action for Blind People operates a Mobile Sight Loss Information service that travels around the UK. Action for Blind People also runs four hotels, but in 2009, the hotels were rebranded as Vision Hotels. Action local teams are based in Birmingham, Bristol, Carlisle, Exeter, Leeds, Liverpool, Loughborough, Manchester, Middlesbrough, North London, Norwich, Preston, Salisbury, South London, Stafford, Stoke and Wallsend.

== Vision Hotels ==
Action for Blind People originally ran the hotels under the Action for Blind People name, but in 2009, the hotels were rebranded as Vision Hotels.

Vision Hotels are three AA 3 star hotels in South Devon, Somerset and Lake Windermere.

The Cliffden Hotel is in Teignmouth, South Devon. The Lauriston Hotel, Weston-super-Mare, Somerset Windermere Manor, Windermere, Cumbria.

The hotels were put up for sale in 2016, as the charity reportedly could not afford the upkeep of three hotels.
