= Keresley =

Suburban village in the City of Coventry, England

Coordinates: 52°26′N 1°32′W

Keresley is a suburban village and civil parish in the City of Coventry, West Midlands, England, about 4.5 miles (7 km) north of Coventry city centre and 3.5 miles (6 km) southwest of Bedworth. According to the 2001 census, the parish had a population of 791 falling to 713 at the 2011 Census, although the 2018 population was estimated at 783.

Keresley and Keresley End are two separate areas; Keresley is in Coventry, whilst Keresley End, also known as Keresley Village or Keresley Newlands, is in Warwickshire, with the exception of Thompsons Road in the village, which lies within the Coventry boundary. The village features two grocers shops, two bus stops, a beauty salon, primary school, doctors surgery, a fish and chip shop, a small church, a post office, library, park, garden centre and community centre.

== Location ==
Keresley is located to the northwest of the city and lies within the Bablake ward, bounded by the Woodlands, Whoberley, Sherbourne, Radford and Holbrook wards.

Neighbouring villages include Corley, Corley Moor, Ash Green and Brownshill Green.

== History ==
For most of its history, Keresley was a combination of two further villages: Keresley Green was the most northerly and first to exist, but it was Keresley Heath to the south which was developed the most with the building of schools and the church of St. Thomas. However, in 1911 the construction of Coventry Colliery by the Warwickshire Coal Company near to Keresley Green brought the focus of development back to that area. It was not until 1974 that the two parts of Keresley lost their separate identities and became united. The closure of the colliery followed in 1991.

Keresley parish is largely rural and contains some beautiful ancient woodland. Coventry City Council's wildlife surveys which include Keresley parish, have classified much of the area as an "A" grade - "An area of very high natural history value, containing several varied habitats and a wide diversity of plants and animals". The area has a lot of footpaths which make it accessible to the public and is probably one of the few areas of Coventry where you can hear skylarks. Despite this Coventry City Council propose the area can be developed as an "Eco" suburb with 3000 homes, and a separate estate of new properties is currently being built, as of January 2010.

== Etymology ==
The etymology of the word Keresley suggests that it is Saxon in origin, meaning that the name could originate from the 7th century, although the village was not cited in the Domesday Book of 1086.

The -ley suffix is shared by many villages in the country, and means a clearing in the woods. This means that Keresley was a clearing in the Forest of Arden. And the Keres- prefix is thought to either be a corruption of the Saxon word for cress or someone's name, meaning together either: The cress clearing, or 'Mr' Cress's Clearing.

== Parish Church ==
The Church of England parish church of Saint Thomas is just off the Tamworth Road (B4098). It was designed by the Gothic Revival architect Benjamin Ferrey in the Early English style and built in 1844–45. The bell tower has a ring of six bells. St Thomas's is a Grade II listed building.

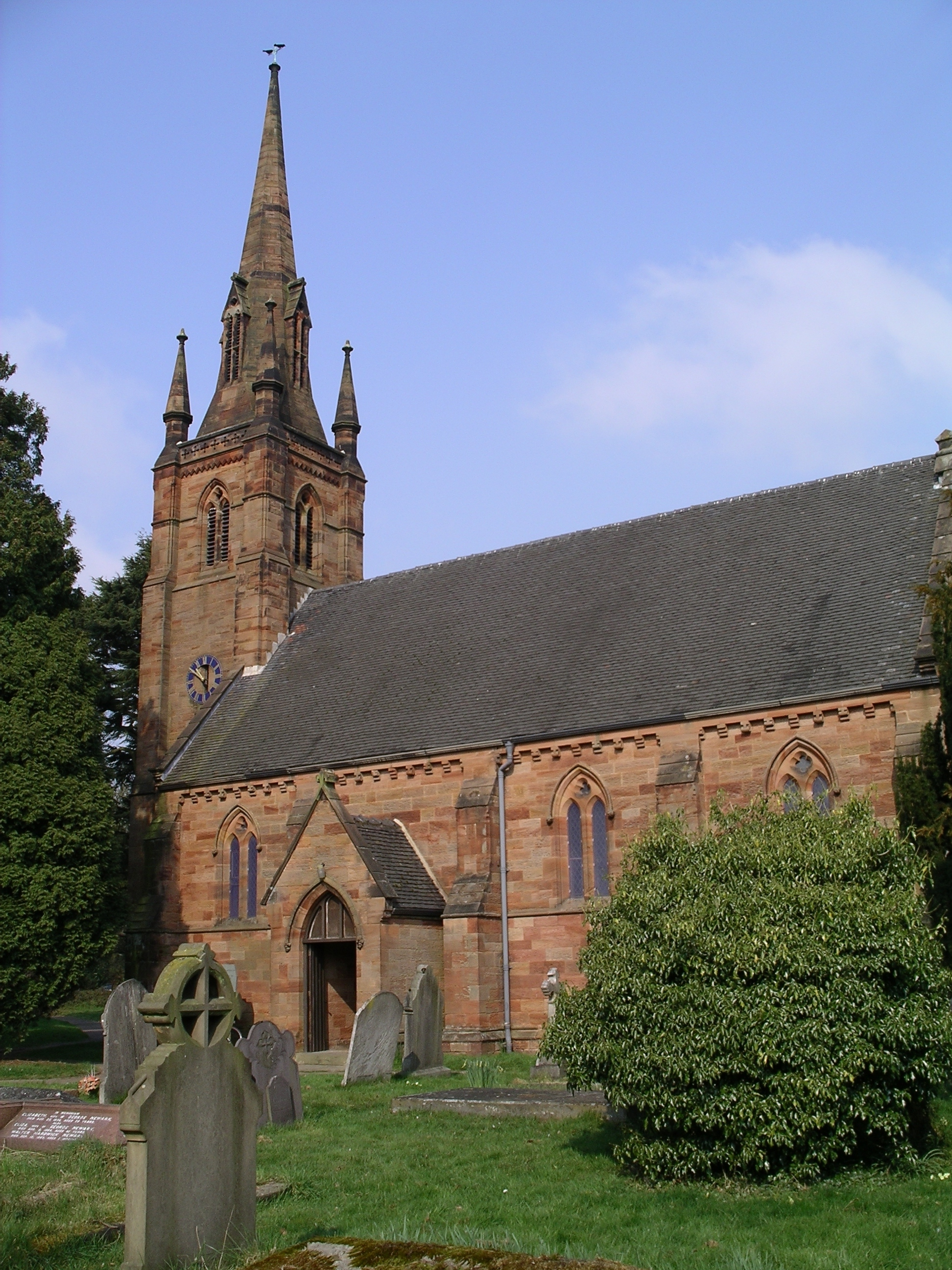
St Thomas' Church, Keresley.

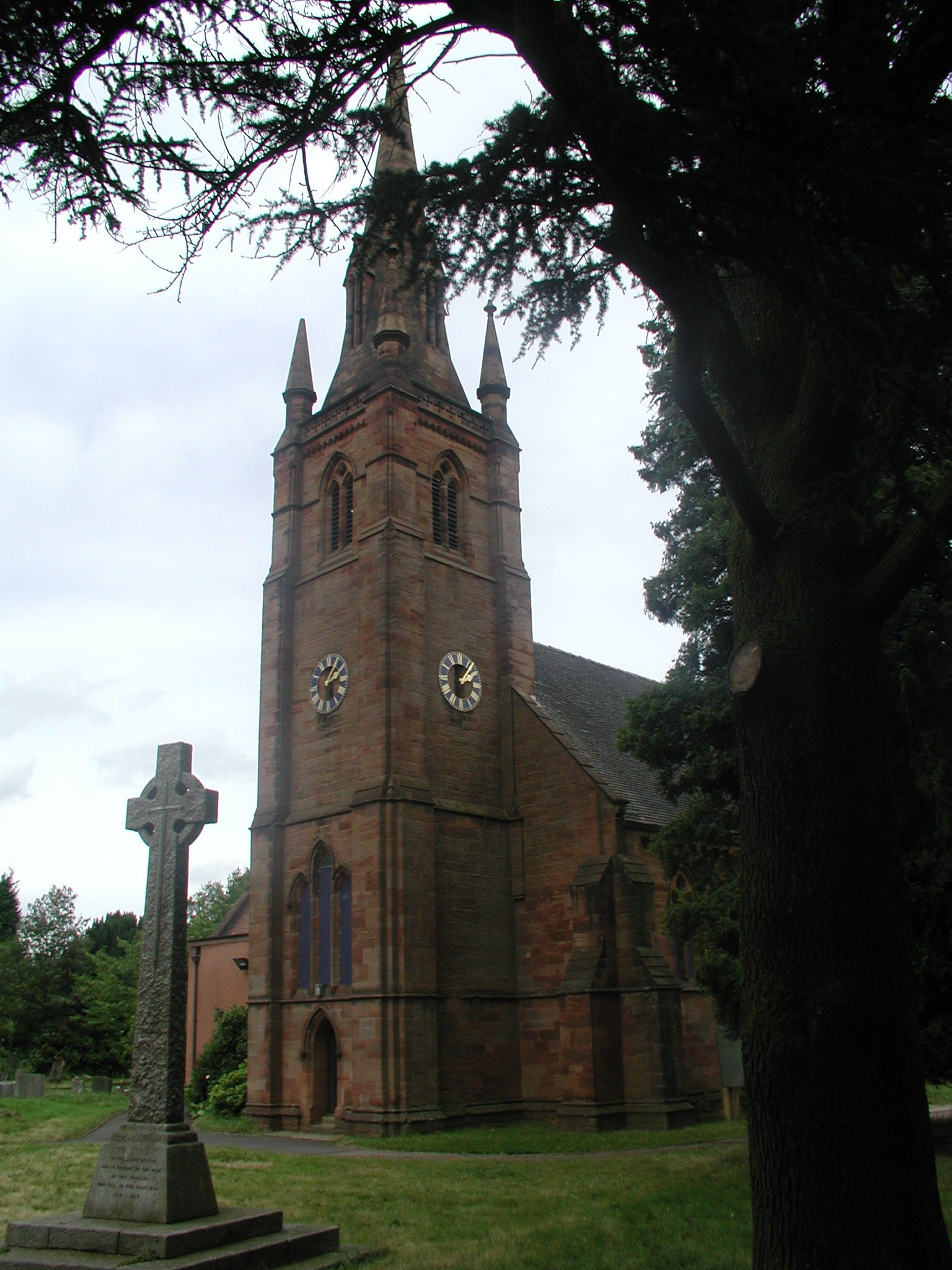
The tower of St Thomas' Church.

== Public services and local amenities ==
Coventry City Council is the local government body of the City of Coventry. The city is divided up into 18 Wards each with three councillors.

Coventry forms part of the West Midlands Police force area. The neighbourhood policing team for Keresley, Coundon and Allesley are the Bablake neighbourhood team.

== Notable residents or persons born in Keresley ==
- Clive Owen, actor
- Kevin Warwick, cybernetics professor
- Graham Joyce, novelist
- Ian Marter, writer and actor known for playing Harry Sullivan in Doctor Who
- Roddy 'Radiation' Byers guitarist of 1980s ska band The Specials
- Graham Stevenson, British Communist leader, trade unionist, and author
- William Tallon, nicknamed "Backstairs Billy", was a resident of the village as a teenager, prior to him joining the Royal Household in 1951.

== Apple rain ==
On the evening of Monday 12 December 2011 hundreds of apples reportedly fell from the sky over the junction between Kelmscote Road and Keresley Road, in Keresley, Coventry. Several witnesses reported that hundreds of apples seemingly fell out of the sky landing on the ground, and on several cars, below. This incident received both local and national media coverage and, although it drew comment by the Met Office, it still remains unexplained.

== Sources ==
- Pevsner, Nikolaus; Wedgwood, Alexandra (1966). The Buildings of England: Warwickshire. Harmondsworth: Penguin Books. ISBN 0-14-071031-0.
