= Ryan Kelly (actor) =

British actor

- Born: Glasgow, Scotland
- Education: Exhall Grange School; Royal National College for the Blind; Bristol Old Vic Theatre School
- Occupation: Actor
- Years active: 2000–present
- Spouse: Sonia Blakemore (m. 2004)
- Children: 1

Ryan Kelly is a Scottish-born actor best known for playing the role of Jack "Jazzer" McCreary in the BBC Radio 4 soap The Archers. Kelly has played this role since 2000.

Kelly was born in Glasgow, but moved to the Midlands at the age of three. Born without eyes and, as a result, blind from birth, he attended Exhall Grange School in Coventry and the Royal National College for the Blind in Hereford, where he studied drama. In 1997, he became the first totally blind student in the history of the Bristol Old Vic Theatre School gaining a place there over 3,000 other applicants. In 2000 he was selected for the part of Jazzer in an open audition with eight sighted actors.

On 22 November 2011, Kelly was the inaugural recipient of the Tyzack Award at the Ability Media International awards. The award recognises writers, producers and performers who "transcend the stereotypical".

Kelly married Sonia Blakemore in 2004. The couple first met while teenagers at school. The couple have one daughter.
