= Bedworth =

Market town in Warwickshire, England

Coordinates: 52.4791°N 1.4712°W

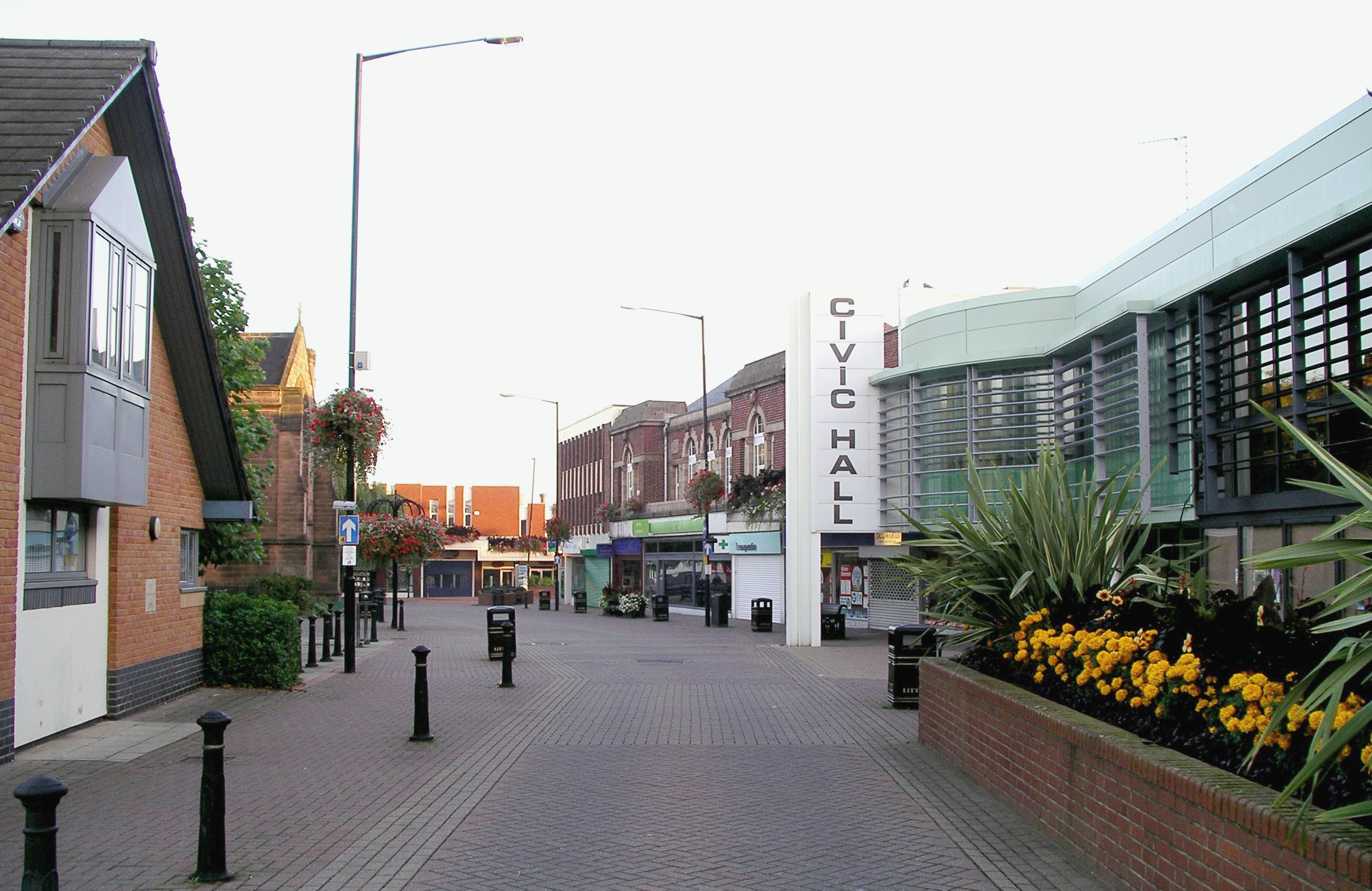
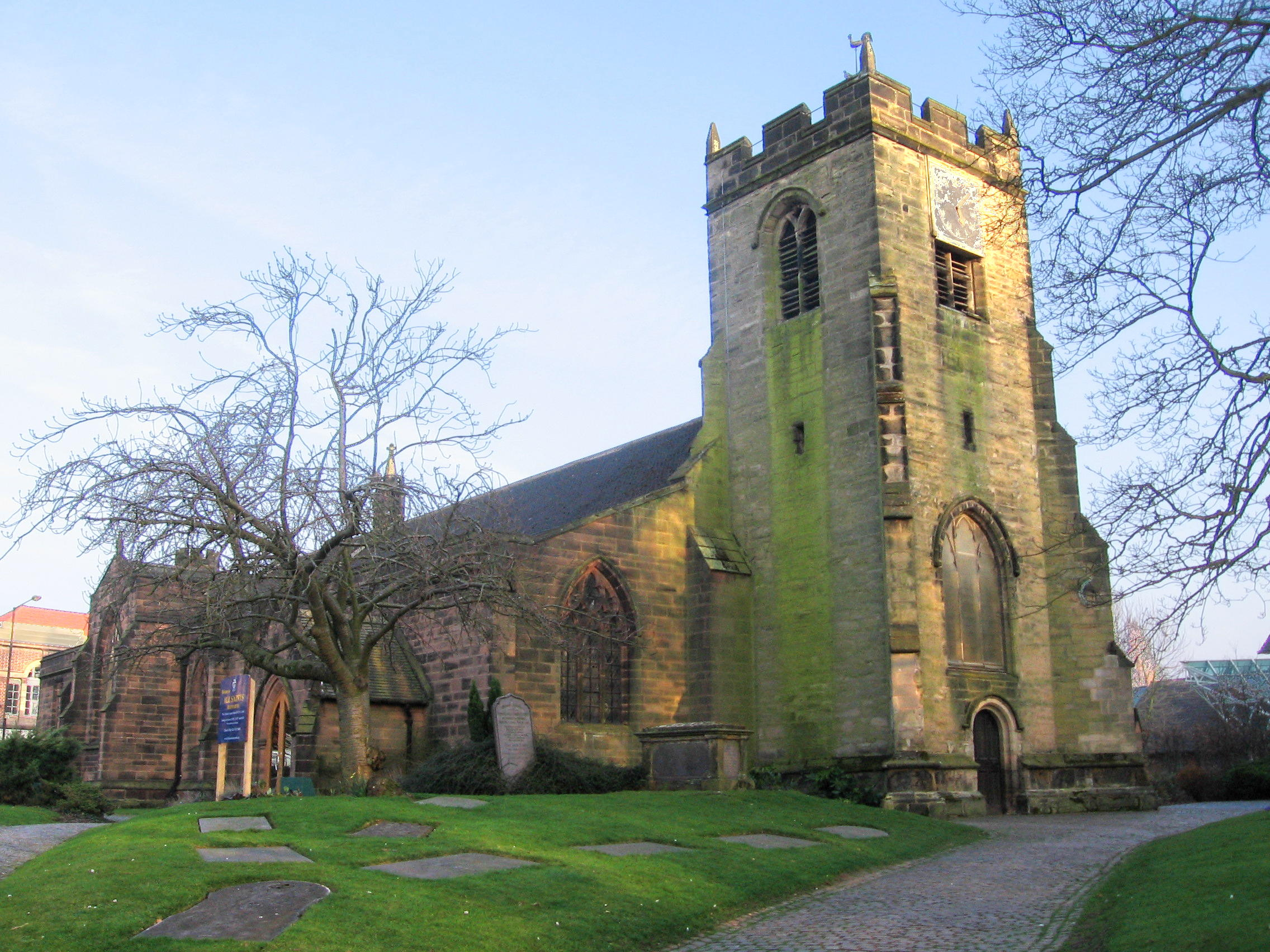
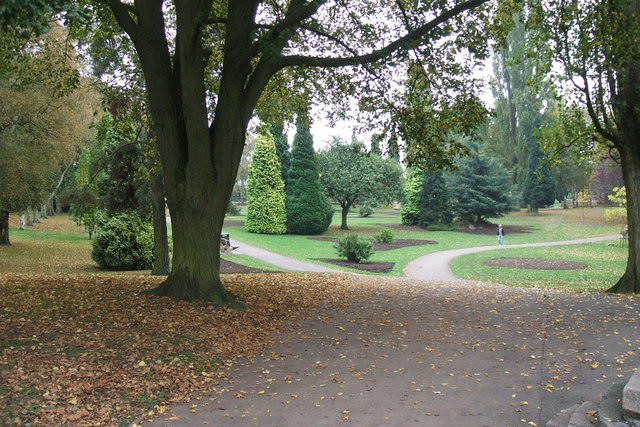
- From left to right: Top:Bedworth High Street and Civic Hall; Bottom: All Saint's Church & Miners' Welfare Park

- Location within Warwickshire
- Population: 31,090 (2021 census)
- OS grid reference: SP3586
- District: Nuneaton and Bedworth
- Shire county: Warwickshire
- Region: West Midlands
- Country: England
- Sovereign state: United Kingdom
- Post town: BEDWORTH
- Postcode district: CV12
- Dialling code: 024
- UK Parliament: North Warwickshire and Bedworth

Bedworth (/ˈbɛdwərθ/ or locally /ˈbɛdərθ/) is a market town in the borough of Nuneaton and Bedworth, Warwickshire, England. It is situated between Coventry, 5 miles (8.0 km) to the south, and Nuneaton, 3 miles (5 km) to the north. In the 2021 census the town had a population of 31,090. The town is pronounced locally as "Beduth", but as "Bedworth" almost everywhere else.

== History ==
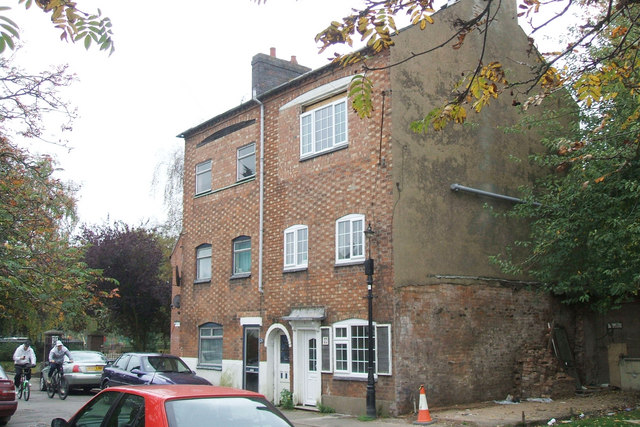
Former topshops. They were a common feature in Bedworth's and Coventry's textiles industry during the 19th and early 20th centuries. The lower two floors served as the weaver's private dwelling, while the upper floor acted as the workplace. This photograph clearly shows how the windows on the top floor were once much bigger, to allow in more daylight.

The name Bedworth derives from the Old English Bedaworð meaning 'Beda's enclosure'.

Originally a small market town with Saxon origins, Bedworth was mentioned in the Domesday Book of 1086 as Bedeword. The first record of a priest at Bedworth was from 1297. The town suffered great decline as a result of the Black Death in the 14th century. In 1590, the town was described as being home to just 14 families. By 1730, Bedworth had recovered somewhat as a result of local coal mining, and was described as containing 260 houses.

Following the passage of the Five Mile Act 1665, which forbade Nonconformist church goers from assembling for worship and preaching within five miles of a corporate town such as Coventry. Bedworth, being exactly five miles from Coventry became a local centre for Nonconformists who assembled at the town. In 1686 the Reverend Julius Saunders established the Old Meeting congregation just north of the five-mile post. An old plaque that was on the mile-post can still be seen on a gate post of the Almshouses. In 1726, a Presbyterian Nonconformist chapel now of the United Reformed Church was built here which still stands, and was restored in 2012.

Bedworth developed into an industrial town in the 18th and 19th centuries, due largely to coal mining and the overspill of ribbon weaving and textile industries from nearby Coventry: Located on the Warwickshire coalfield, coal mining in the area was recorded as early as the 13th century, but grew to a large scale as a result of the Industrial Revolution. The industry peaked in 1939 when there were 20 pits in the area producing over 5.8 million tons of coal. The last colliery in Bedworth, Newdigate Colliery closed in 1982 and Coventry Colliery on the edge of the town closed in 1991. The ribbon weaving industry had been introduced to the area by French Huguenot immigrants in the 18th century; it thrived for nearly a century, until it was largely wiped out in the 1860s following the Cobden–Chevalier Treaty which removed tariffs on imported French silks, causing enormous hardship to the town. Hat making however grew and largely replaced the ribbon trade, and lasted until the 1950s.

The opening of the Coventry Canal in 1789 and later the Coventry to Nuneaton railway in 1850 enhanced the town's growth. More recently, the M6 motorway was opened just south of the town in 1971.

From 1894, Bedworth was a civil parish within the Foleshill Rural District. In 1928, Bedworth was incorporated as an urban district in its own right. In 1932, the urban district was enlarged by the addition of Exhall and parts of Foleshill, Astley and Walsgrave on Sowe parishes. It was further enlarged in 1938 by the addition of Bulkington. In 1974, the Bedworth Urban District was merged with the Municipal Borough of Nuneaton to create the borough of Nuneaton and Bedworth.

== Geography ==
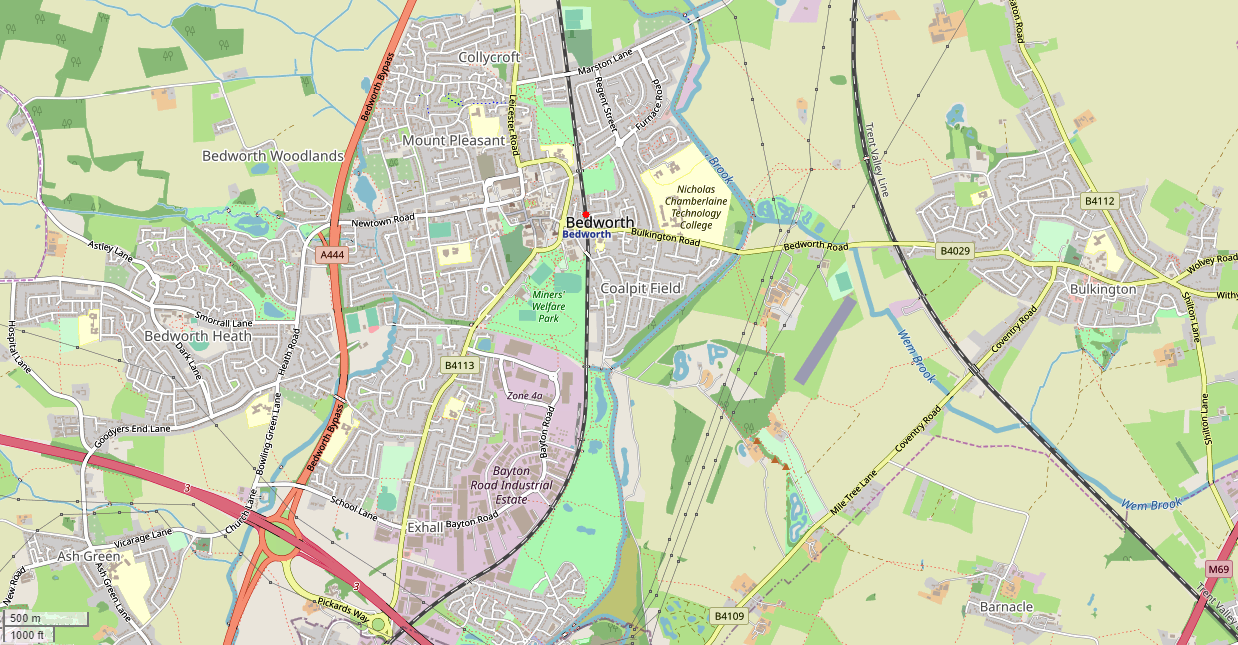
Map of Bedworth and Bulkington.

Bedworth lies 101 miles (163 km) north-west of London, 19 miles (31 km) east of Birmingham and 17 miles (27 km) north-north-east of the county town of Warwick.

Bedworth has six main suburban districts, namely: Collycroft, Mount Pleasant, Bedworth Heath, Coalpit Field, Goodyers End and Exhall. Exhall is a generic name for the area surrounding junction 3 of the M6 motorway, comprising parts of both Bedworth and Coventry. Around 1.5 miles (2 km) to the east of Bedworth is the large village of Bulkington, and around 2 miles (3 km) to the south-west, separated by a short gap is the village of Ash Green.

Bedworth is almost contiguous with Coventry; it is defined as being part of the Coventry and Bedworth Urban Area.

The River Sowe rises in Bedworth flowing through Exhall, northern and eastern Coventry, Baginton and Stoneleigh, before joining the River Avon south of Stoneleigh.

== Features ==
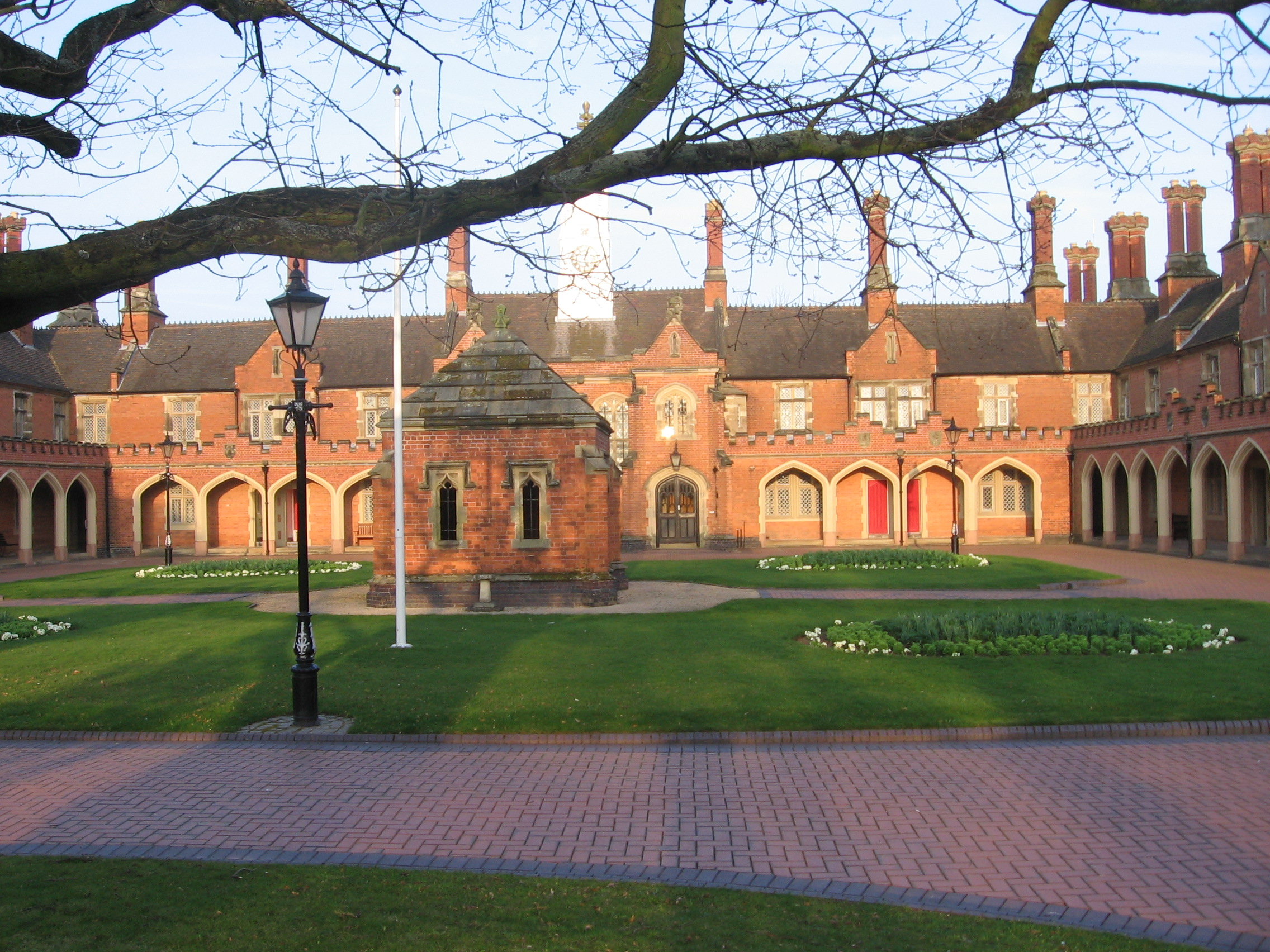
Nicholas Chamberlaine Almshouses

Among the most notable buildings in Bedworth are the Nicholas Chamberlaine Almshouses on All Saints' Square in the town centre, which are built in Tudor style and date from 1840, These replaced the original buildings which had been funded by a legacy from the local benefactor Nicholas Chamberlaine (1632–1715) through his will. The almshouses were restored in the 1980s and are now Grade II* listed.

The majority of the town centre was redeveloped in the 1960s and early 1970s, with the typical architecture of that period and consists of a pedestrianised shopping precinct. The town centre itself contains some of the usual high street retail names, as well as many charity shops, card shops and banks.

The main venue in Bedworth is the Bedworth Civic Hall which opened in 1973 in the town centre, which has an attached arts centre.

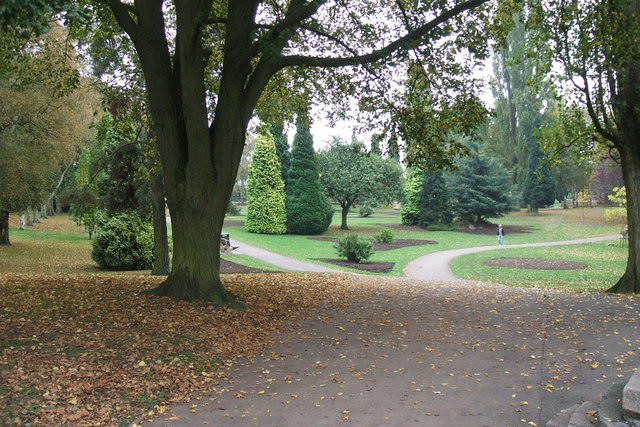
Miners' Welfare Park

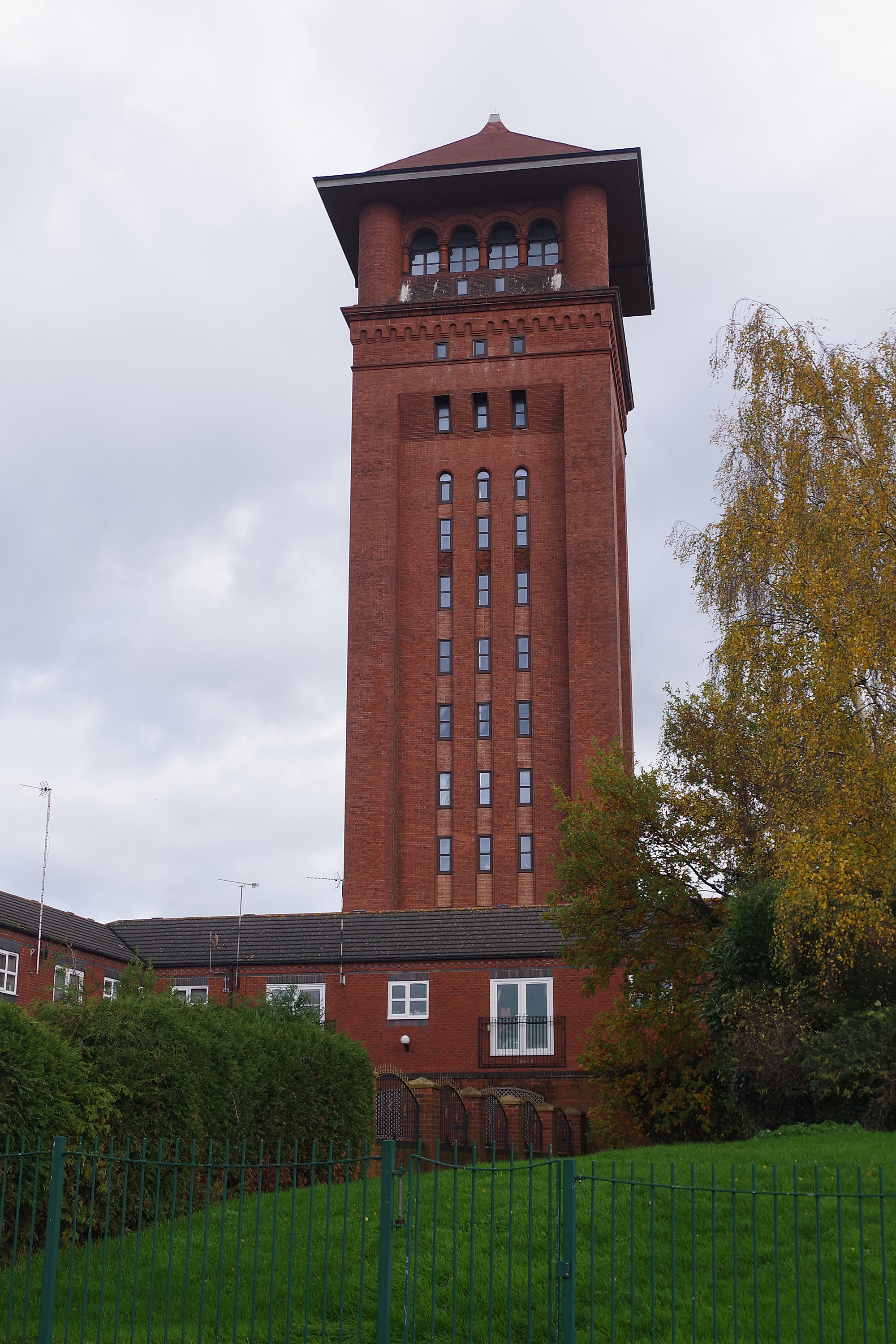
Bedworth Water Tower

South of the town centre is the Miners' Welfare Park, which opened in 1923, originally to provide a recreation space for miners and their families. Now managed by the local council it includes playing fields, sports facilities, footpaths and gardens. A new play area, on the site of the previous aviary and paddling pool near the cricket ground within the park, was dedicated in June 2012 to Sergeant Simon 'Val' Valentine. He was born and brought up in Bedworth, a soldier of 2nd battalion Royal Regiment of Fusiliers who died in August 2009 while serving his country in Helmand Province, Afghanistan. The town centre was closed and thousands of townspeople paid their respects at Sergeant Valentine's funeral in 2009.

The former Bedworth water tower is probably the most noticeable landmark building in Bedworth; built in 1898 in the then fashionable Romanesque style, at approximately 45 metres (148 ft) high, it is visible from miles around and has been Grade II listed since 1987. It originally had a 60,000 gallon water tank, but became obsolete in 1988 when a new water mains was installed into Bedworth. The tower is home to a pair of peregrine falcons, first noted in 1998. In 2015 it was sold to be converted into six luxury apartments.

Along Mill Street, until recently, were rows of former weavers' cottages which were once inhabited by Huguenot weavers. Some of these were still used as shops, although most had become derelict. They have been demolished as part of the redevelopment of Tesco.

== Economy ==
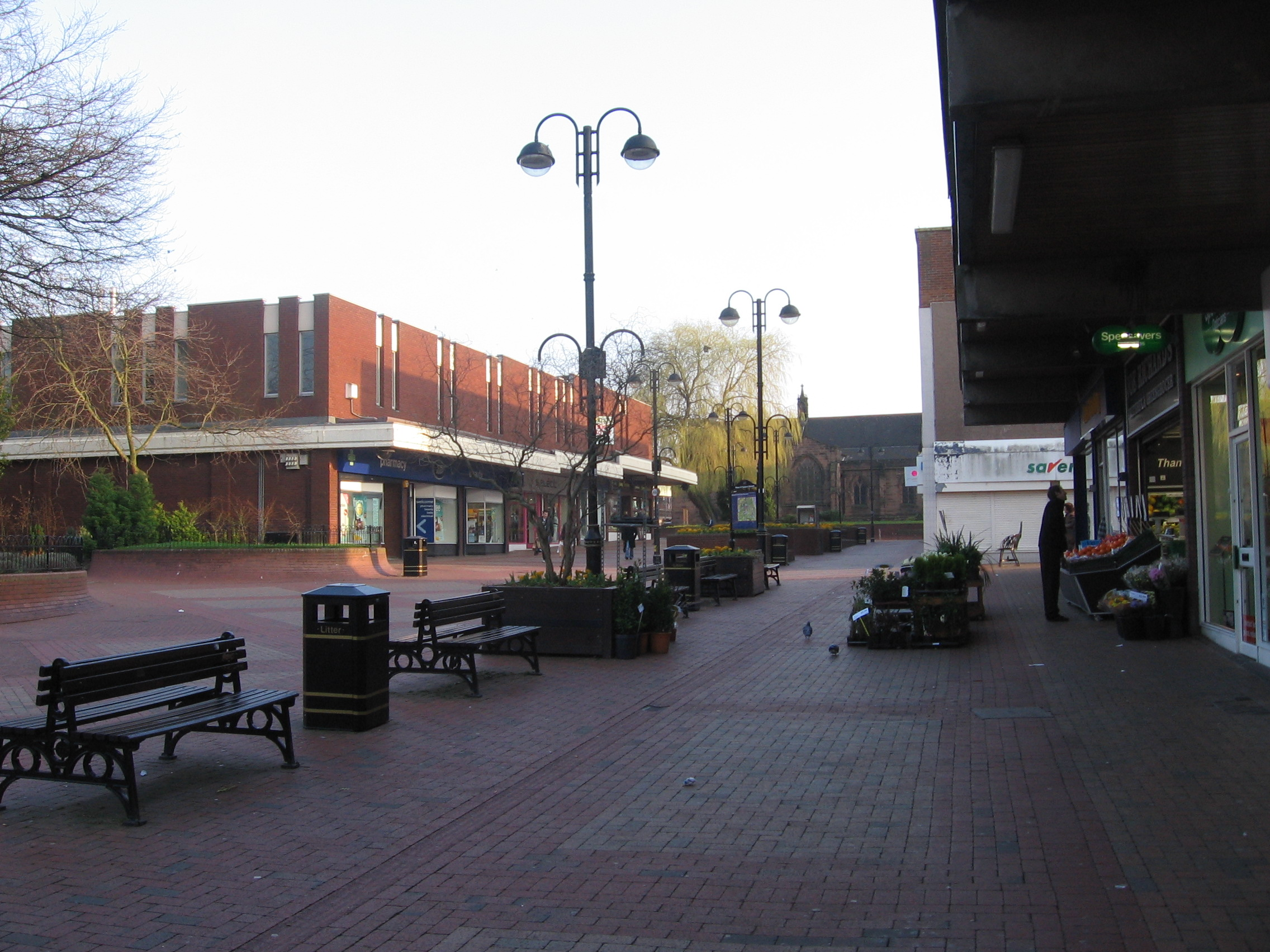
All Saints' Square – church at the far end. The almshouses are to the left out of picture.

With most of its historic industries gone, there is still some specialist manufacturing that continues in the town; one firm in Bedworth, Toye, Kenning & Spencer, specialises in producing items such as hats and caps, banners, flags, medal ribbons and Masonic regalia.

At the Bayton Road industrial estate in Exhall is a manufacturing firm, Premiere Group, which specialises in producing sheet metal products, primarily for the automotive sector. The firm won the contract to produce 12,000 Olympic torches for the 2012 Olympic Games. The German mechatronic car component manufacturer Brose that supplies 80 vehicle manufacturers worldwide has its UK factory in the estate. The estate was also the home of Abbey Panels which prior to 2002 produced prototype vehicle bodies for many car manufacturers including the first run of alloy bodied Jaguar XK120s in 1948. They also produced aluminium alloy racing car bodies for Jaguar's Le Mans winning cars of the 1950s, along with Formula 1 car bodies in the same era. The company continues as Loades Limited with a site on Bayton Road, but oriented to steel buildings for commercial properties named after their founder Edward Loades.

The domestic appliance insurer Domestic & General has offices in the town centre, as does Warwickshire County Council.

== Politics ==
Bedworth lies within the parliamentary constituency of North Warwickshire and Bedworth, the local MP since 2024 has been Rachel Taylor of the Labour Party.

There are two tiers of local government coverting Bedworth at county level (Warwickshire County Council) and district level (Nuneaton and Bedworth Borough Council) Bedworth is unparished and does not have its own town (parish) council. Although the creation of a Town Council has been suggested.

== Religion ==
=== Church of England ===
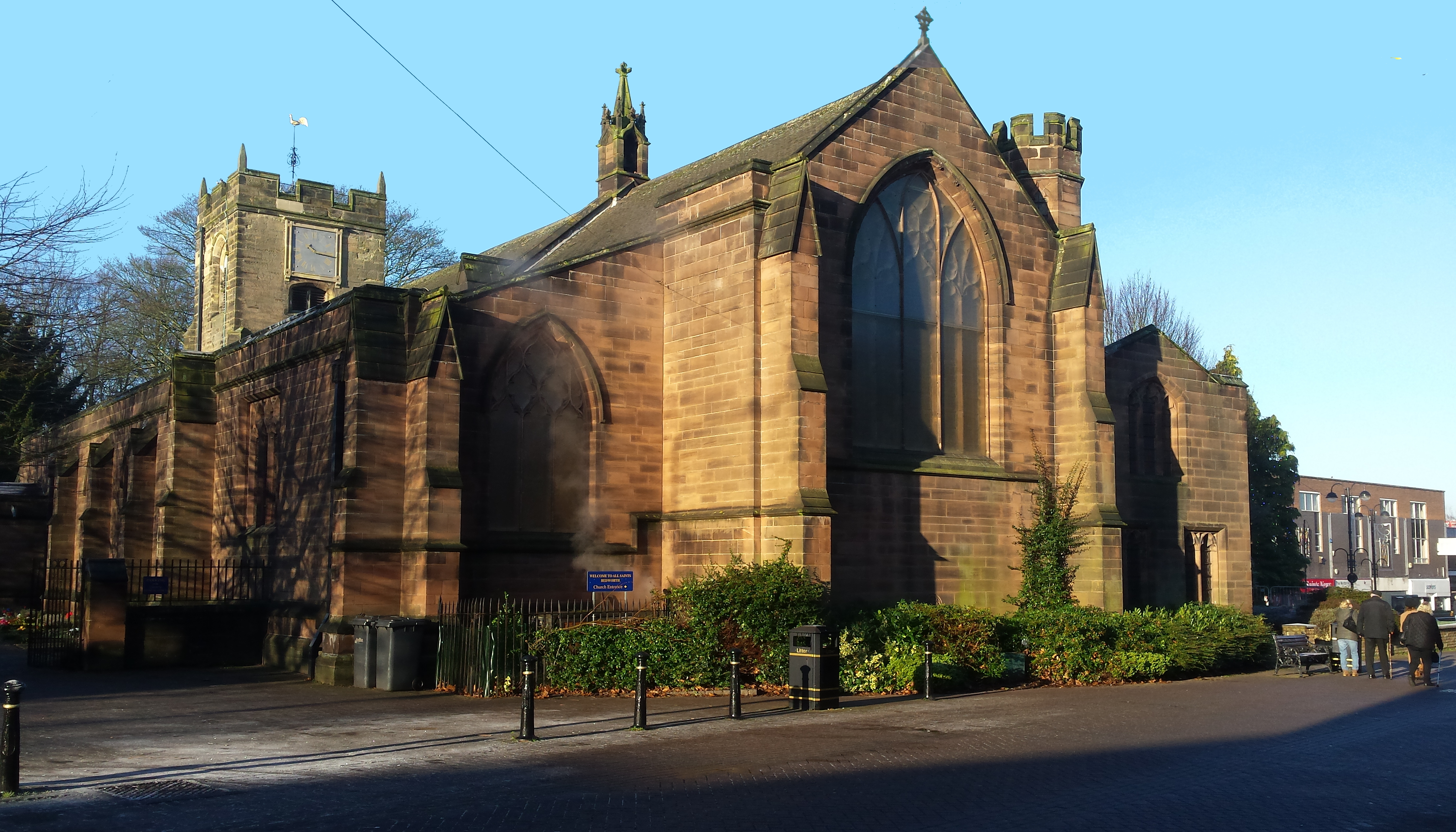
All Saints church

All Saints' Parish Church (Church of England) is situated in the town centre. A church has stood at the site since the 14th century and it still retains its original tower from that period. The rest of the church has been rebuilt several times; the current building dates from the late Victorian era, when it was rebuilt during 1888–1890 out of Runcorn sandstone at a cost of £8,000 raised by public subscription. It replaced the previous building which dated from 1606. The church is now grade II* listed.

=== Roman Catholic ===
St Francis of Assisi Roman Catholic Church is a prominent building in the town centre. The first church at the site opened in June 1883. Over later years, a number of additions were made, including the porch and tower. The church was made a parish church in 1919 and, in September 1923, it was consecrated in its current form by Archbishop McIntyre.

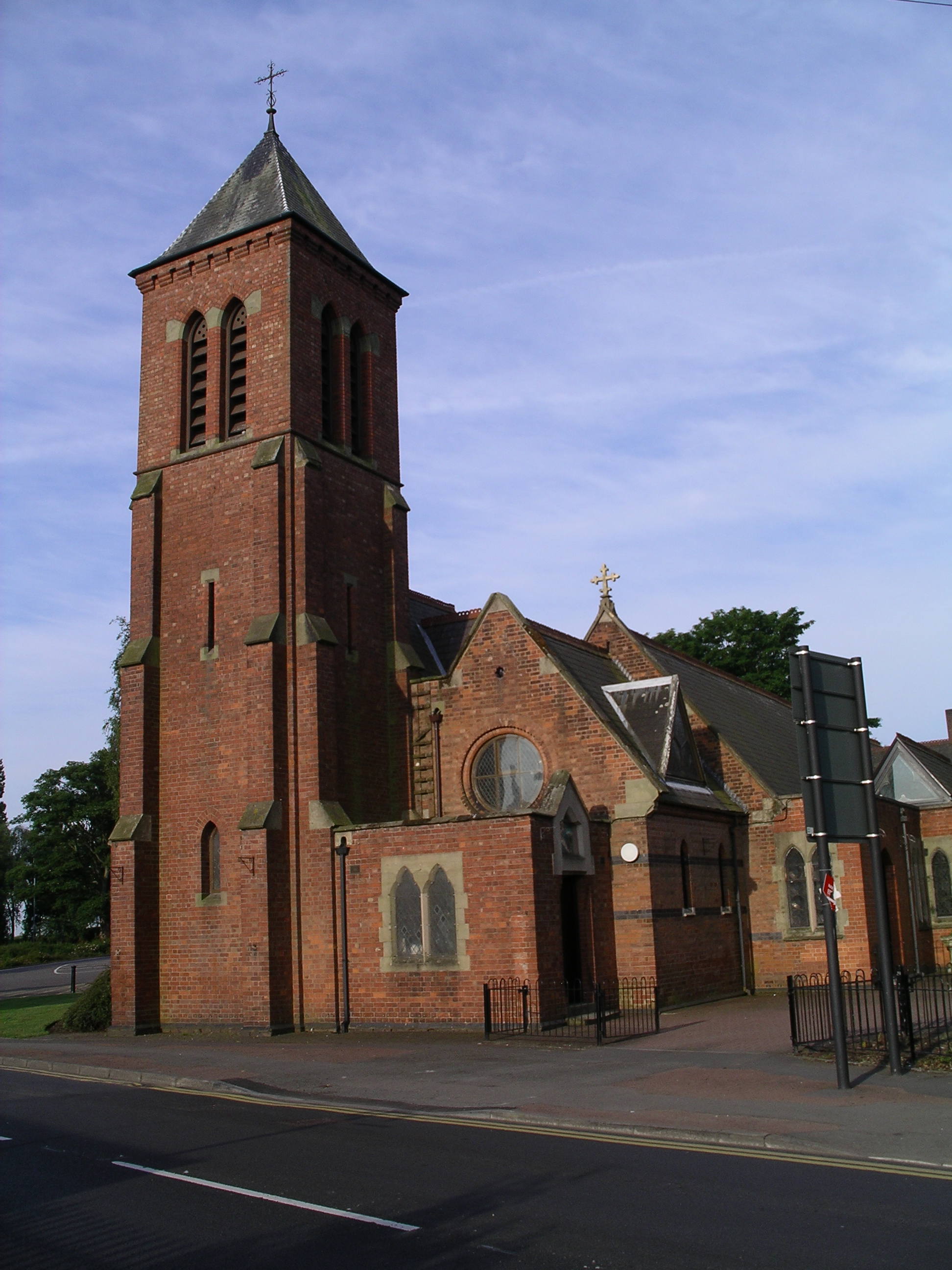
St Francis of Assisi Roman Catholic Church, Bedworth.

In the early-1970s the interior of the church was modernised, with the tabernacle, altar, pulpit, font, Mary and Child, and the Sacred Heart and Risen Christ, all made by the noted Maltese artist and sculptor Carmel Cauchi.

The church is part of the Rugby Deanery in the Roman Catholic Archdiocese of Birmingham.

=== Other Christian denominations ===
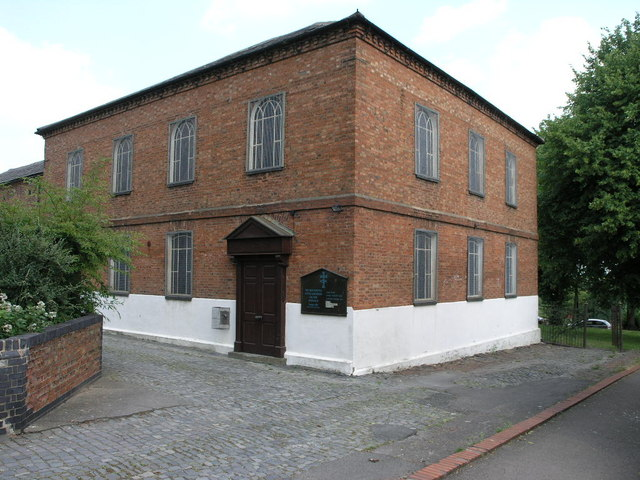
United Reformed Church, Bedworth.

There are also Bedworth Methodist Church and the United Reformed Church off Chapel Street in the town centre, which dates from 1727, Bedworth Baptist Church on Coventry Road near the football ground as well as Life Church on Bulkington Road. A Kingdom Hall of Jehovah's Witnesses is in Deronda Close, behind The Newdigate Arms. Zion Baptist Church is on Newdigate Road and is a striking 1977 replacement of the original 1796 chapel on High Street, which was demolished to make way for the Civic Centre.

=== Sikhism ===
Bedworth has a Sikh gurdwara on Bayton Road in Exhall, named the Gurdwara Dhan Dhan Baba Vadbhag Singh Ji.

== Demographics ==
At the 2021 census, there were 31,090 residents in Bedworth, up slightly from 30,459 in the 2011 census, and 29,082 at the 2001 census.

In terms of ethnicity in 2021:

- 88.3% of Bedworth residents were White
- 6.9% were Asian
- 1.6% were Black
- 1.7% were Mixed.
- 1.4% were from another ethnic group.

In terms of religion, 51.1% of Bedworth residents identified as Christian, 40.7% said they had no religion, 5.1% were Sikh, 1.4% were Hindu, 1.0% were Muslim, 0.3% were Buddhists and 0.5% were from another religion.

== Sport and leisure ==
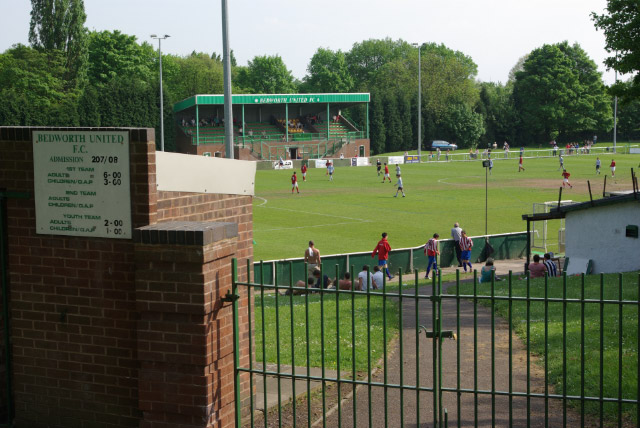
The Oval Football Ground, home of Bedworth United

The town has a rugby union team, Bedworth Rugby Football Club, that has a senior men's team, a senior ladies touch team, and a mini & junior section for boys & girls; it is based at the "Old" Nursery at Nicholas Chamberlaine School.

The non-League football team Bedworth United F.C. plays at the Oval Ground. There is also a swimming club called Nuneaton and Bedworth Dolphins.

The town is proud host to the Bedworth Parkrun on a Saturday and Bedworth Park 5k on a Sunday. Both of these runs are held in the Miners Welfare Park at 9am.

== Armistice Day ==
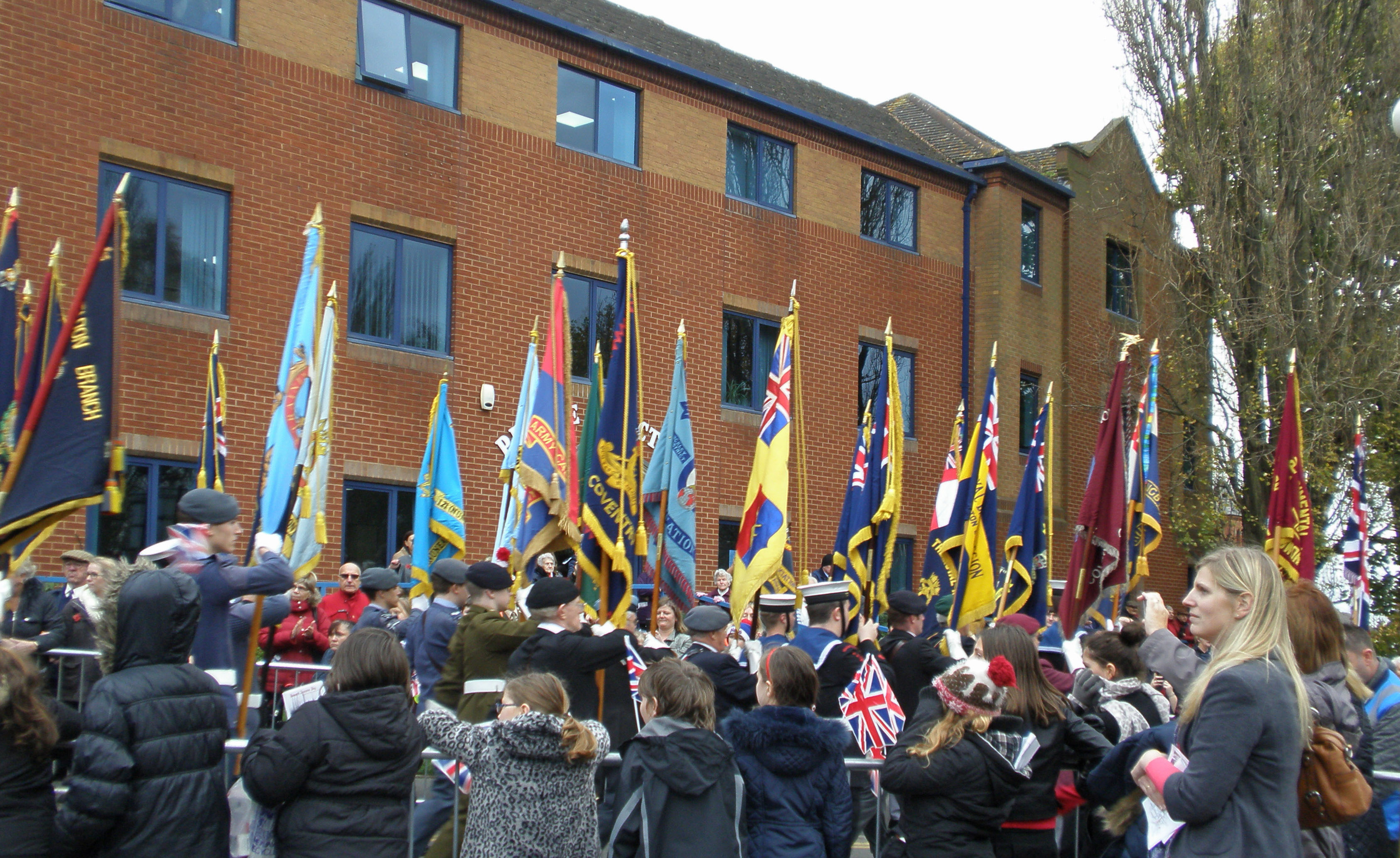
Bedworth Armistice Day parade in 2015

Bedworth has billed itself as the "town that never forgets" due to its tradition of large Armistice Day commemorations on 11 November. They are well attended by the population, who gather in the town to watch the veterans' armistice parade that concludes with the laying of poppy wreaths at the war memorial, to pay their respects to those who fought and died in the armed forces. Local youth groups like the Girls' Brigade and cadets march through the town as part of the parade, with bands playing commemorative music. Second World War Douglas C-47 Skytrain 'Dakota' military transport aircraft, also known as the civilian version Douglas DC-3, scatter remembrance poppy petals over the town, aiming at the war memorial if the weather permits. Before 2005 Spitfire fighters were used.

Bedworth chose to keep 11 November as Armistice Day, even after 1939, when the rest of the country moved to the nearest Sunday. In more recent times, the tradition was kept up by Frank Parsons. The former Royal Marine died in 2011, but his work over the previous 25 years not only kept Bedworth's tradition – unique in the United Kingdom – alive, but also lent significant weight to the campaign to move Remembrance Day back to 11 November.

In January 2026, the parade was nominated to UNESCO's Intangible Cultural Heritage list.

== Transport ==
=== Road ===
Bedworth has good transport links, being situated immediately north of the M6 motorway at junction 3, with access via several slip roads onto the A444 dual carriageway bypass. The A444 also provides fast access to Nuneaton, the Ricoh Arena, the Arena Retail Park and northern/central Coventry.

=== Railway ===
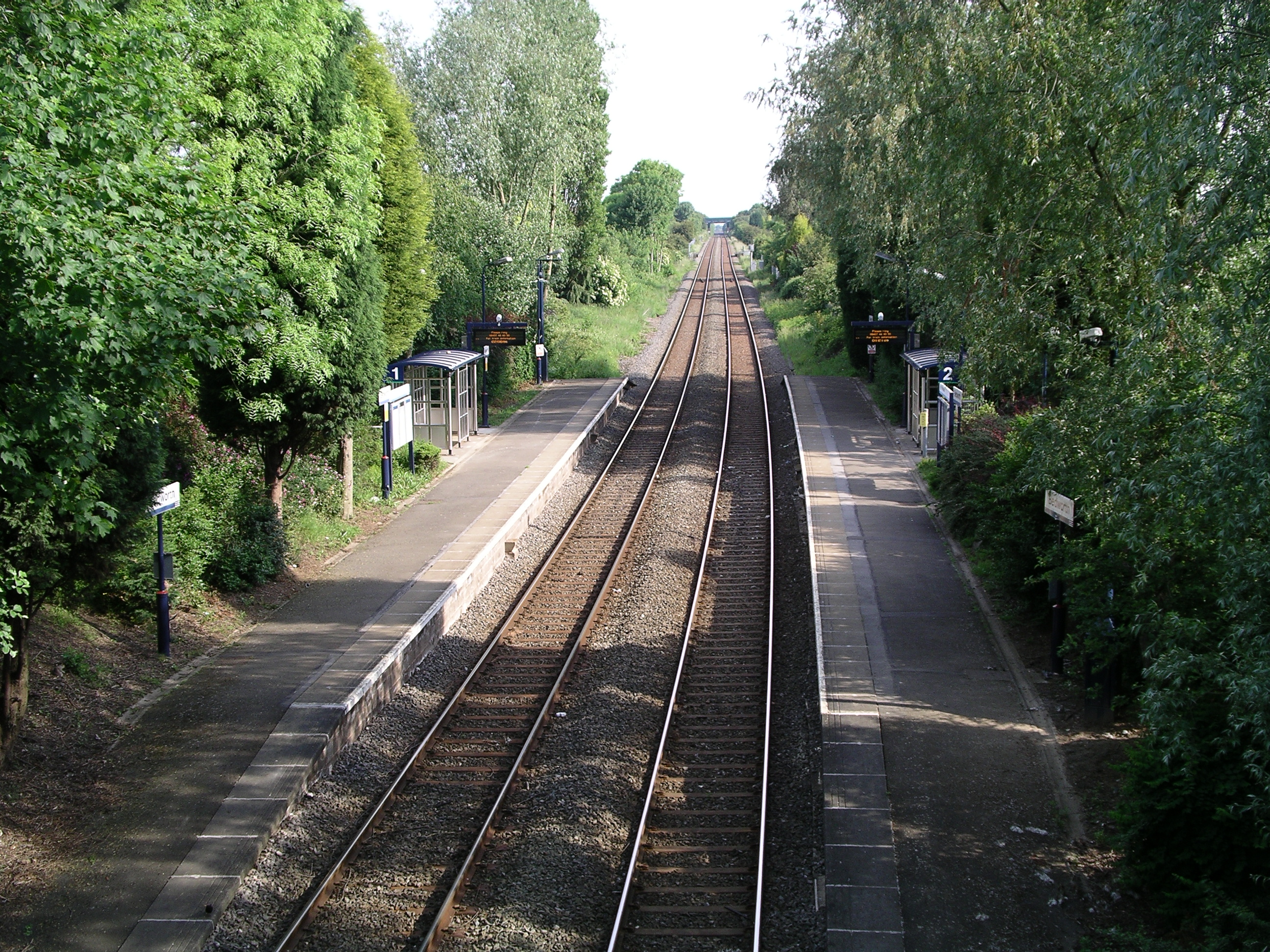
Bedworth station

Bedworth railway station is a stop on the Coventry to Nuneaton Line and was reopened in 1988, after the original station at the same site was closed in 1965 during the Beeching Axe. West Midlands Railway operates an hourly service in each direction between Leamington Spa and Nuneaton.

Historically two more stations were in the vicinity of Bedworth which are now closed: Just south of the town was Hawkesbury Lane, also on the Coventry-Nuneaton line which closed in 1965; to the east was Bulkington on the Trent Valley Line which closed in 1931.

=== Buses ===
Bus services to Coventry city centre are operated by Stagecoach in Warwickshire and West Midlands Bus. Stagecoach also provides direct services to Nuneaton, Bulkington, Keresley, Atherstone, Hinckley and Leicester. A direct service to the University Hospital in Walsgrave, Coventry, is provided by Arriva Midlands.

=== Waterways ===
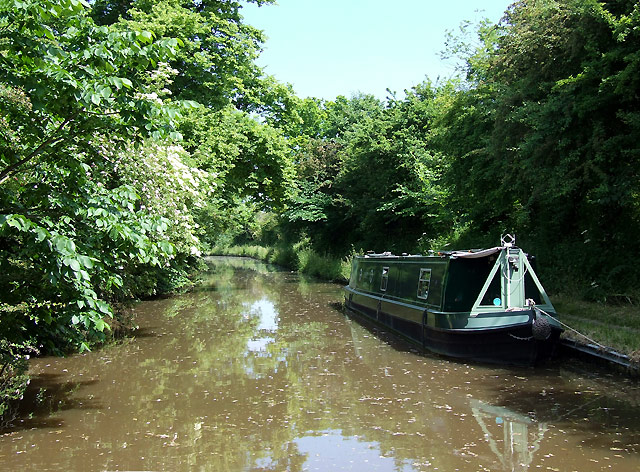
The Coventry Canal at Bedworth

The Coventry Canal runs along the eastern edge of the town. Just outside Bedworth to the north-east is Marston Junction, where the Coventry Canal joins the Ashby Canal. Just to the south-east at Hawkesbury Junction it joins the Oxford Canal.

=== Tramways ===
Historically Bedworth was the northern terminus of the Coventry Corporation Tramways system, which operated from the late 19th century until closure in 1940.

== Schools ==
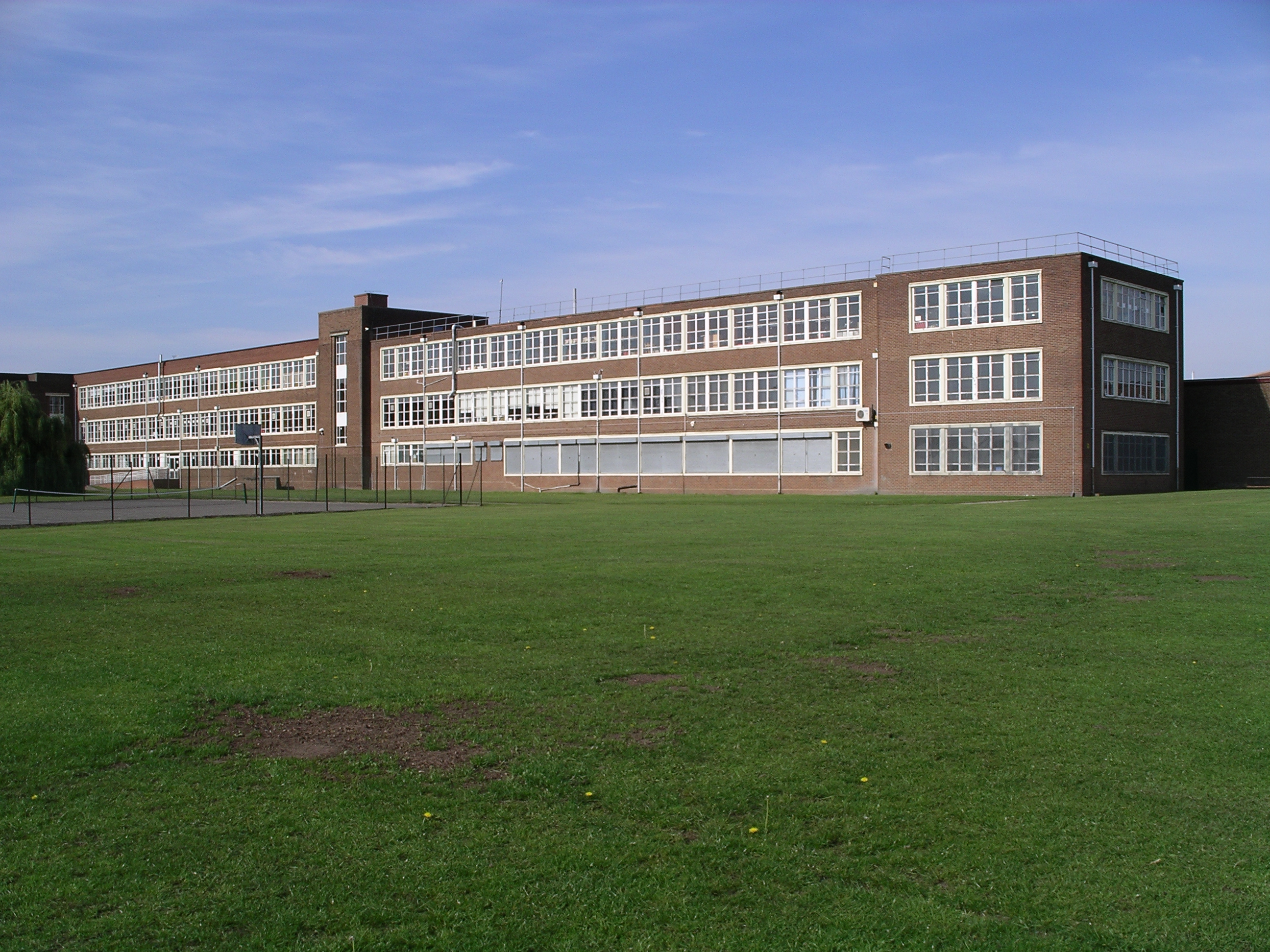
Nicholas Chamberlaine School

- Nicholas Chamberlaine School
- Ash Green School

== Media ==
=== Radio ===
The local radio stations are:

- BBC CWR: 94.8 FM
- Fosse 107: 107.9 FM
- Free Radio Coventry and Warwickshire (formally known as Mercia Sound, Mercia FM and Mercia): 97.0 FM
- Anker Radio – which serves the nearby George Eliot Hospital, but can be heard on 1386 AM.
- BBC Radio Leicester can be received in the town on 104.9 FM.

=== Written media ===
The main local newspapers are:

- The Nuneaton News (originally known as the Evening News upon launch and then the Heartland Evening News) serves the whole of north Warwickshire and some border areas in Leicestershire. The newspaper is owned by Local World and is published on weekdays. The Wednesday edition is circulated free throughout the town, whereas the daily paper on Monday, Tuesday, Thursday and Friday are paid. It was founded in 1992, following the decision of the Tribune's publisher to switch to a weekly freesheet.
- The Tribune (formerly the People's Tribune (1895), Midland Counties Tribune (1903) and Nuneaton Evening Tribune (1957)): It is owned by Trinity Mirror's Coventry Newspapers (publisher of the Coventry Telegraph). Covering 'northern Warwickshire' (particularly Bedworth, Atherstone & Nuneaton), the free paper is available weekly to collect at many newsagents in the area on a Thursday or Friday. In September 2015 The Tribune ceased publication. The last edition was published on Thursday 24 September.
- The Nuneaton Telegraph; a localised sub-edition of the Coventry Telegraph, it was launched in 1992 (when the aforementioned Tribune switched from daily to weekly production).
- The Bedworth Local is a local business directory, news and local interest website serving Bedworth, Nuneaton, Exhall and Bulkington.

=== Television news ===
The Nuneaton area is covered on regional TV News by:

- BBC (West) Midlands Today
- ITV News Central

== Notable people ==
- Nona Bellairs (1824–1897), writer and philanthropist.
- Nicholas Chamberlaine (1632–1715), priest, benefactor.
- Pete Doherty, (born 1979) former Libertines front-man, attended Nicholas Chamberlaine School.
- Diane Elson, (born 1946) economist, sociologist.
- Conrad Keely, (born 1972) of American rock group ...And You Will Know Us by the Trail of Dead was a resident of Bedworth.
- Brian Locking, (1938–2020) musician, one time member of The Shadows.
- Rev Richard Mudge (1718–1763), clergyman, composer and brother of the eminent clockmaker Thomas Mudge, died here.
- Alan Randall (1934–2005), entertainer

=== Sport ===
- Jordan McFarlane-Archer (born 1993), professional footballer.
- Nick Skelton, (born 1957) winner of a gold medal in London 2012 Olympics, winner of the Hickstead Derby and European showjumping championships.
- Kyle Storer (born 1987), professional footballer
