= Visionary (charity) =

English organisation for vision loss groups

Visionary, formerly known as the National Association of Local Societies for Visually Impaired People (NALSVI), based in Doncaster, England, is the umbrella organization serving over 120 UK Charities supporting local people with a visual impairment. NALSVI was established in 1991 and through its various members is able to reach over 350,000 blind and partially sighted people.

NALSVI is administered by an Executive Committee drawn up of elected representatives from individual visual impairment charities across 12 regions of the UK. A Conference is held at Chester College each July. Members meet on a regular basis to share information, undertake training and work on projects or on campaign issues of benefit to visually impaired people.
