= 1949 Exhall mid-air collision =

Aviation incident in England

Occurrence
- Date: 19 February 1949
- Summary: Mid-air collision
- Site: Exhall, Warwickshire, United Kingdom; 52.468°N 1.511°W
- Total fatalities: 14
- Total survivors: 0

First aircraft
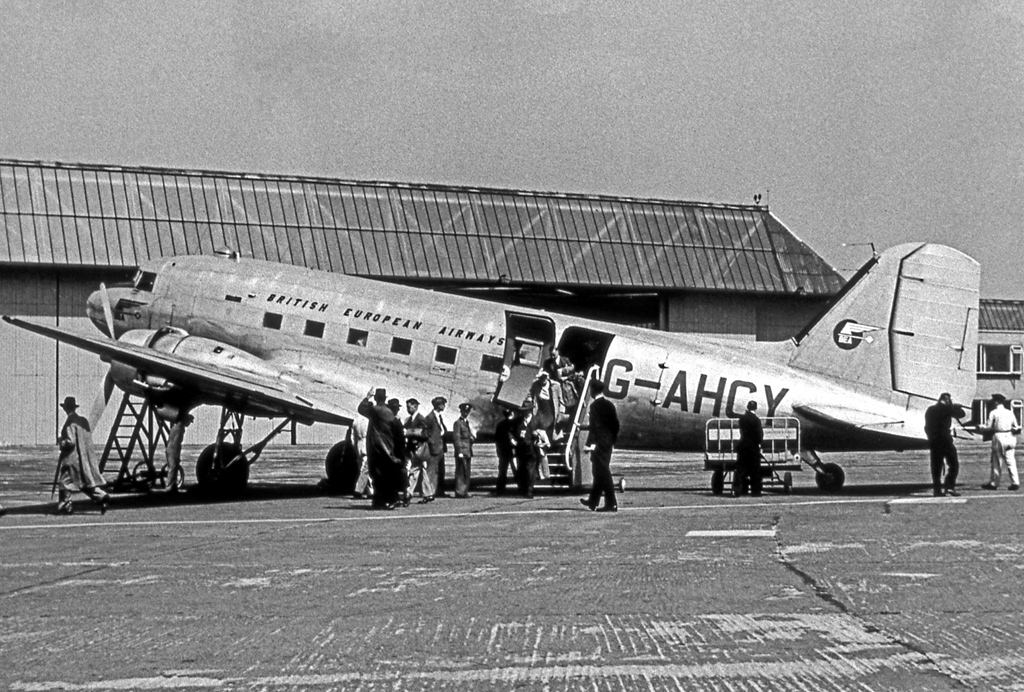
- A Douglas Dakota, similar to the aircraft involved. This particular aircraft would crash later that year.
- Type: Douglas Dakota
- Operator: British European Airways
- Registration: G-AHCW
- Flight origin: Northolt Airport, England, United Kingdom
- Destination: Glasgow-Renfrew Airport, Scotland, United Kingdom
- Passengers: 6
- Crew: 4
- Fatalities: 10
- Injuries: 0
- Survivors: 0

Second aircraft
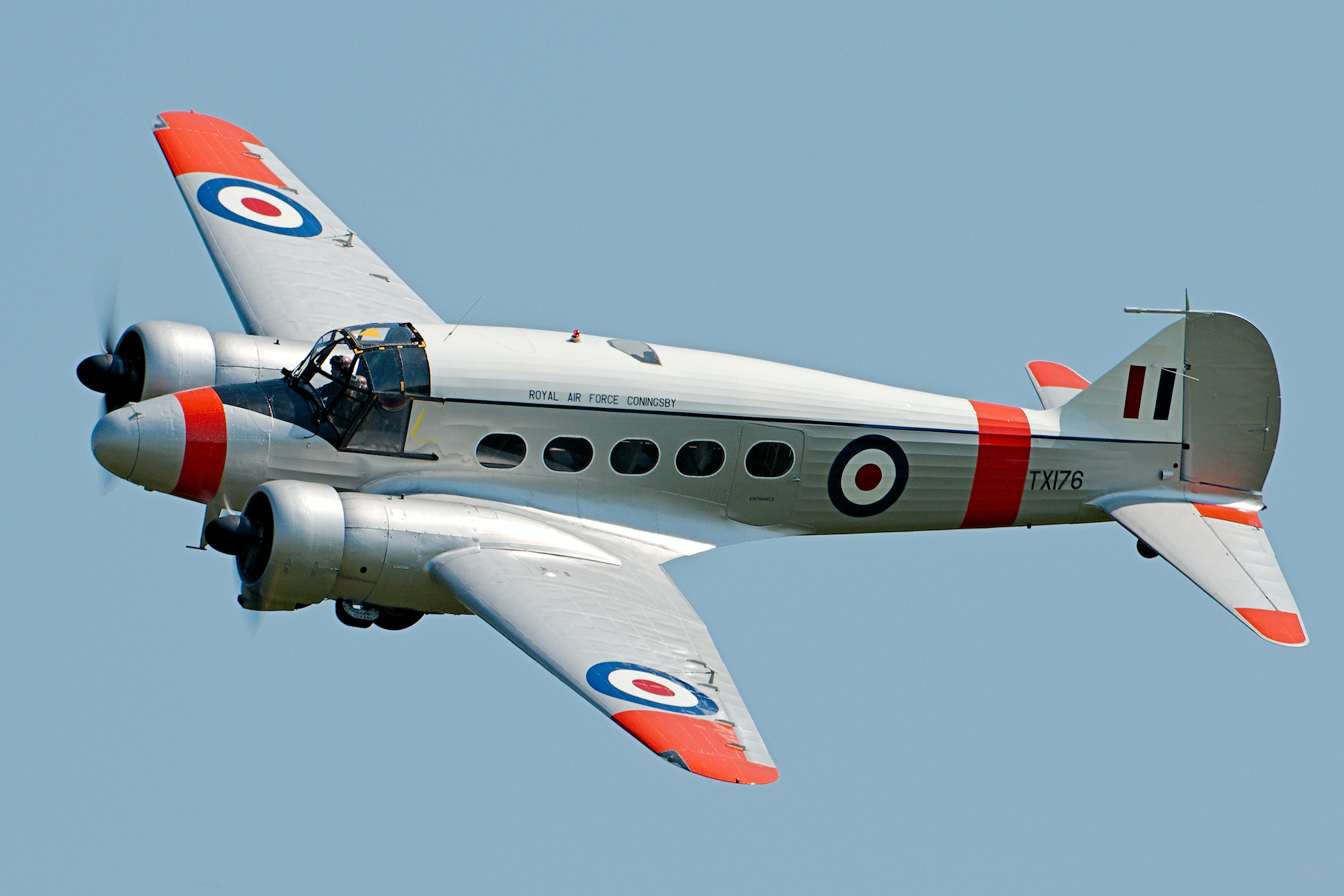
- A Avro Anson T21, similar to the accident aircraft
- Type: Avro Anson T21
- Operator: Royal Air Force
- Registration: VV243
- Flight origin: RAF Middleton St. George, United Kingdom
- Destination: RAF Middleton St. George, United Kingdom
- Passengers: 0
- Crew: 4
- Fatalities: 4
- Injuries: 0
- Survivors: 0

The Exhall mid-air collision happened on Saturday 19 February 1949 over the village of Exhall when a British European Airways Douglas DC-3 / Douglas Dakota collided in clear weather with a Royal Air Force Avro Anson T21.

The Dakota was on a flight from Northolt Airport near London to Glasgow-Renfrew Airport in Scotland. With a crew of four it was carrying six passengers, and had taken off from Northolt at 09:13. The Royal Air Force Avro Anson T21 was being operated by No. 2 Air Navigation School on a cross-country training exercise from RAF Middleton St. George to Chatteris, in the Fenland district of Cambridgeshire, England. It had departed at 8:09, and carried a captain, wireless operator, instructor, and a flight student.

At about 10:00, the two aircraft collided at 4,500 feet (1,400 m) near the village of Exhall, near Coventry in Warwickshire. Witnesses to the accident reported that the Avro struck the Dakota at the root of the airliner's right wing, which was then broken off.

Upon colliding, an explosion destroyed both aircraft and flaming debris fell to the ground. The wreckage fell near an old peoples' home, the Exhall Lodge Hospital, narrowly missing it. Falling debris landed on rooftops, farms, and roadways, but there were no injuries on the ground. There were no survivors.

Although the weather at the time of the crash was clear, the accident investigation concluded that the crew of neither aircraft saw each other, possibly due to glare from the sun, and blamed the accident on a failure on the part of both captains to keep a proper look-out for other aircraft.
