= Coventry and Bedworth urban area =

Urban area in England

Coordinates: 52.43°N 1.50°W

Map of Coventry/Bedworth Urban Area

The Coventry/Bedworth Urban Area or Coventry Built-up area as defined by the Office for National Statistics had a population of 359,252 at the 2011 census, which made it the 16th largest conurbation in England and Wales by population. It is also one of the most densely populated. In the 2021 census, the population of the urban area was recorded at 389,603.

== Details ==
The largest settlement is Coventry (population 352,900), which is within the West Midlands County. Bedworth (population 30,648) and Binley Woods (population 2,665) are the other main parts of the conurbation and both lie in the county Warwickshire in the districts of Nuneaton and Bedworth and Rugby respectively. There are no other towns in the conurbation.

There is a very small amount of green belt between the Coventry/Bedworth Urban Area and the Nuneaton Urban Area in the north – however, with the development of industrial and retail units in south Nuneaton, the two conurbations are virtually connected – and also between Coventry and Kenilworth. A larger area of green belt exists between Coventry and the Greater West Midlands Urban Area, which extends to about 5 miles.
