= Ash Green School =

Ash Green School (Creative Education Trust)

Location
- Ash Green Lane; Ash Green, Warwickshire, CV7 9AH; England
- Coordinates: 52°27′42″N 1°30′30″W

Information
- Type: Academy
- Local authority: Warwickshire
- Department for Education URN: 137781 Tables
- Ofsted: Reports
- Principal: Fuzel Choudhury
- Staff: 100
- Gender: Coeducational
- Age: 11 to 19 (until 2026)
- Enrolment: 1150
- Website: http://www.ashgreenschool.org.uk

Ash Green School is a coeducational secondary school rated GOOD by Ofsted in 2025 and Sixth Form with an academy status located in the city of Coventry. It teaches approximately 1,100 boys and girls between the ages of 11 and 18 and is one of the largest schools in Warwickshire. The Sixth Form Closes in 2026.

The school is located near the border of Coventry and Warwickshire; although Ash Green School currently sits on the Coventry side of the border, it is governed by Warwickshire as their local authority, and follows their school holiday timetable, for example.

Ash Green School's current principal is Mr Fuzel Choudhury.

== History ==
Originally the site of a hospital during the 1920s, it was converted to a school some time after the Second World War. For a time during the 1980s, its name was changed to Exhall School (similar to Exhall Cedars infant school) following a merge with the comprehensive school at nearby Keresley. However, after several incidents of confusion with the nearby Exhall Grange School, Ash Green School reverted to its former name.

The school has undergone significant periods of improvement in terms of exams outcomes. In 2014 100% gained A* – E at A-Level and 73% 5 A* – C at GCSE with English and Maths.

In 2013 100% 5 A* – C at GCSE, 72% 5 A* – C at GCSE with English and Maths. In 2010, 2011 and 2012, all Year 11 students (100%) achieved at least 5 A* – C grades.

In 2010, 67% achieved these 5 including English and Maths. 65% achieved this outcome in 2011.

In January 2011 the school was ranked fourth in a list of the schools in England that had "shown the greatest sustained improvement in their GCSE attainment over the past four years."

In 2011–2012, the school became an academy as part of the Creative Education Trust.

In July 2012, the school was formally recognised as a provider for Post 16 education. The Sixth Form Centre opened in September 2012 and accommodates students studying AS, A Level courses and BTEC courses.
