= Royal National Institute of Blind People =

UK blindness charity

RNIB
- Royal National Institute of Blind People
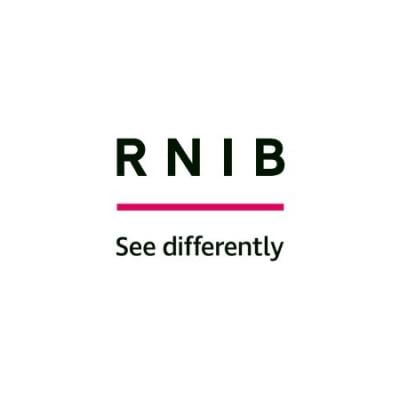

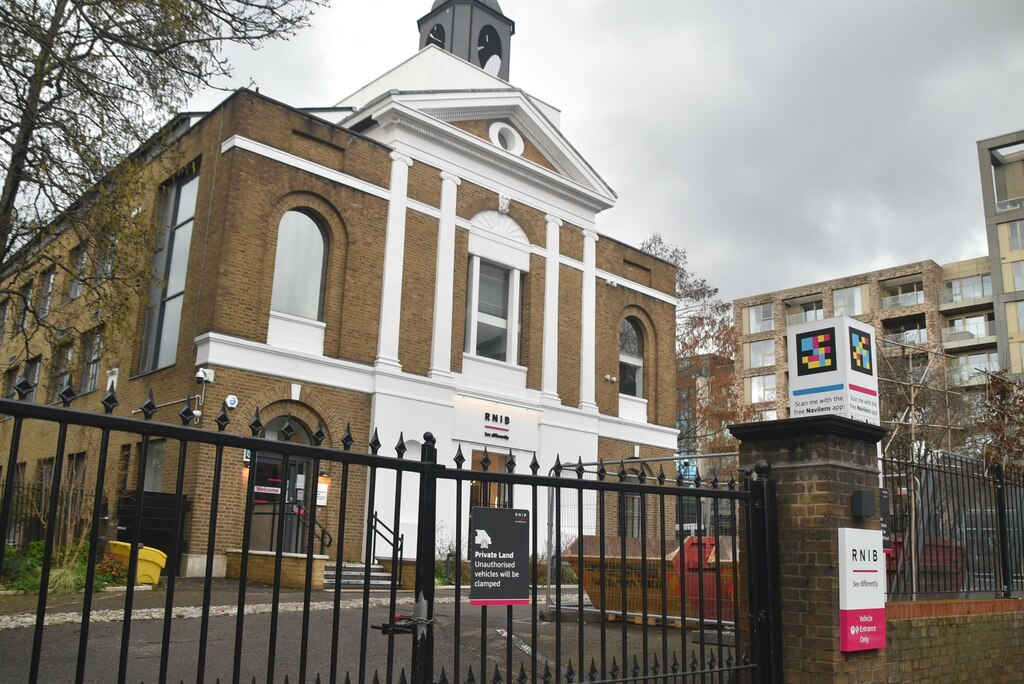
- Formation: 16 October 1868
- Type: Registered charity
- Headquarters: 154a Pentonville Road, London N1 9JE
- Coordinates: 51.5317°N 0.1148°W
- Region served: United Kingdom
- Chief Executive: Simon Antrobus
- Key people: Anna Tylor (Chair)
- Website: rnib.org.uk
- Formerly called: British and Foreign Society for Improving the Embossed Literature of the Blind (1868-1914); British and Foreign Blind Association; National Institute for the Blind (1914-1953); Royal National Institute for the Blind(1953-2002); Royal National Institute of the Blind (2002-2008)

RNIB (formally, the Royal National Institute of Blind People and previously the Royal National Institute for the Blind) is a British charity, founded in 1868, that serves people living with visual impairments. Its standardisation of tactile alphabet systems vastly improved its beneficiaries' educational outcomes during the Victorian and Edwardian eras leading to widespread adoption and a proliferation of material published in Braille.

It is regarded as a leader in the field in supporting people in the UK who have vision loss. The organisation seeks to increase awareness of blind or partially sighted people's lived experiences. Additionally, it campaigns to make services such as healthcare, education and public transport safer and more accessible to people with visual impairments.

The Charity Commission for England and Wales investigated the charity from 2018 to 2020 following reports of child sexual abuse and multiple safeguarding failings at RNIB Pears Centre for Specialist Learning. The commission's subsequent report described its findings as "one of the worst examples we have uncovered of poor governance and oversight having a direct impact on vulnerable people". The RNIB began selling all its eighteen schools, homes and other institutions.

== History ==
=== Founding and standardisation of tactile writing systems in the United Kingdom ===
A partially sighted war surgeon and general practitioner named Dr. Thomas Rhodes Armitage founded the nascent institution on 16 October 1868. Eight years earlier, Armitage's sight had deteriorated to the point where he could not read standard print and he was advised to retire from medicine to preserve his remaining vision.

Several types of tactile alphabet were in use in the mid nineteenth century. These included James Hatley Frere's embossed adaptation of his phonetic shorthand system for the seeing introduced in 1838; Thomas Lucas's stenographic shorthand system also introduced in 1838 and William Moon's Moon type. Moon type retained the roman alphabet's outlines and was becoming popular in the United Kingdom.

"Moon’s system is more generally used in the United Kingdom than any other, organizations having been formed in most of our large towns for the purpose of teaching it." - Armitage 1886

Institutions like the Liverpool School for the Blind preferred the writing systems based on the roman alphabet because their seeing teachers could understand the text without learning to read by touch. However, the lack of uniformity and standardisation meant that there were few embossed texts for blind people to read and no universal writing method.

France had adopted Louis Braille's arbitrary character system of six raised dots, three down and two across. Unlike the twenty one letter Latin alphabet systems, Armitage noted that Braille's sixty two possible combinations provided enough characters for the English alphabet's twenty-six letters and representations of contractions and punctuation marks. Armitage's committee also reported on the system's application in musical notation. In addition to the French adopting the six dot system as their standardised format, every European school for blind and partially sighted people had adopted the system with parts of north, south and central America following suit.

Its first Executive Committee members were Daniel Conolly, W W Fenn, (Note: William Wilthew Fenn (1827–1906), from London, was a landscape painter and author.) Dr James Gale (Note: James Gale (1833–1907) was an inventor from Devon.) and J. L. Shadwell. Their aim was to try every embossed tactile alphabet system, find the one that worked best and get it adopted as a universal standard across the blind and partially sighted community. They met at Armitage's home on 33 Cambridge Square, Hyde Park, London and referred to themselves as the British and Foreign Blind Association for Improving the Embossed Literature of the Blind and Promoting the Employment of the Blind. In May 1870, the group's executive counsil, despite believing that Moon's system might be better for suited to the printed word, unanimously agreed upon Braille as their standard tactile writing system. Subsequently, the group produced stereotyped Braille printing plates and pocket-frames for the embossed writing format. It chose poems by Cowper, Longfellow and a book of Christmas Carols for its early print runs.

In addition to their embossed literature standardisation and proliferation of Braille the executive council corresponded with individuals and organisations domestically and internationally on the matter of blind and partially sighted people's welfare. The public could now subscribe to the organisation and donors contributing five guineas or more became eligible for life membership.

The organisation published A Key to the Braille Alphabet and Musical Notation in 1871 and its Executive Council embarked on its next major project, setting up a music school for the blind. Paris' Institut National des Jeunes Aveugles trained its students in the art of musical keyboard playing and the craft of piano tuning. The institute claimed that thirty percent of its students were self-supporting. Armitage and his committee raised £3000 to establish a British music college called the Royal Normal College for the Blind. Queen Victoria was its first patron, and it enrolled its first two students on March, first 1872. The organisation, which had now shortened its name to The Blind and Foreign Blind Association spent the latter part of the nineteenth century expanding the provision of Braille music, literature, maps, games and writing and arithmetic frames. It published the first instalment of its Progress magazine in 1881 and by 1890 it employed forty blind people as Braille writers alongside several sighted voluntary transcribers proficient in the writing system.

A Royal Commission was established in 1885 "to investigate and report upon the condition of the blind in the United Kingdom". The commission recommended that 16-21 year old blind young people should receive grants to learn trades.

By the end of the Edwardian era the organisation had seven Braille magazines in circulation. Its product catalogue included essay collections, adult and children's fiction, books on obscure languages such as Esperanto, FooChow and Welsh; books on humanities, science, religion and cartography. It also sold Braille watches alongside gambling equipment such as embossed playing cards and dominoes. Transcriptions of Romantic music by Frédéric Chopin, Edward Elgar, Franz Liszt and Robert Schumann for the organ, piano and violin. Books on music theory, hymns and dance music. And its inventory of writing equipment now included typewriters.

=== 1914-present ===
In 1914 the organisation elected its first president, Sir Arthur Pearson, changed its name to the National Institute for the Blind (NIB) and King George opened a new larger headquarters in Great Portland Street. Pearson appointed the trade-unionist and human rights campaigner Ben Purse as the institution's director of aftercare in 1916. It claimed that it changed its name to reflect its remit as a national body involved in all aspects of the welfare of blind people.

From 1917 to 1920 it campaigned alongside Purse' trade union group National League of the Blind for separate legislation ensuring the welfare and dignity of blind people, not a redrafting of Britain's Poor Law.

During The Great War Pearson established a rehabilitation centre for soldiers who had lost their sight in combat. It was originally named St Dunstan's and located in Regents Park. It retrained the war-blinded in trades such as joinery or cobbling and 20th century professions such as typing and telephone operating.

It partnered with the Chartered Society of Massage and Medical Gymnastics to open a massage school to retrain visually impaired ex-servicemen as masseuses upon their return from The Great War through the Government Training Grants Scheme.

It claimed that it changed its name to reflect its remit as a national body involved in all aspects of the welfare of blind people. The organisation was renamed the Royal National Institute for the Blind in 1953, having been granted a Royal Charter in 1949.

From the late 1980s the organisation began to raise awareness of eye health in the wider population. Previously, ophthalmologists and optometrists took on the responsibility for eye health awareness.

From 2000 until 2023, RNIB operated from premises on Judd Street, in Bloomsbury, London, which it shared with Guide Dogs. In 2023, The Duchess of Edinburgh opened the organisation's new headquarters in the Grimaldi Building on Pentonville Road, London, which has been adapted to cater for the needs of people who are blind, partially sighted or neurodivergent.

In 2002, the organisation was renamed the Royal National Institute of the Blind ("of" rather than "for" blind people) when it became a membership organisation. To coincide with the launch of the UK Vision Strategy in 2008, it was renamed the Royal National Institute of Blind People. In October 2008, RNIB and Action for Blind People agreed in principle to combine some services across England. The new arrangement began in April 2009, resulting in Action for Blind People becoming an associate charity of RNIB. It merged with RNIB on 1 April 2017.

Anna Tylor, who is partially sighted, has been RNIB's Chair since 2020. Former Children in Need Chief Executive Simon Antrobus was appointed to the charity's chief executive role in 2026.

Queen Elizabeth II was the charity's Patron throughout her reign (1952–2022). King Charles III is now the charity's Patron,

Since the 1950s, the charity's collection boxes have featured a yellow children's puppet character name Sooty.

== Programmes and services ==
RNIB's helpline gives access to sight loss experts for questions and guidance.

RNIB's extensive range of reading services includes RNIB Bookshare – a free library of over one million items, which supports students and others in education with a vast collection of accessible textbooks and materials – and Talking Books, a service first established in 1935, which provides thousands of audiobooks, both fiction and non-fiction.

RNIB's ECLO (Eye Care Liaison Officers) service aims to help patients understand the impact of a sight loss diagnosis and to direct them to appropriate sources of support.

== Campaigning ==
RNIB campaigns to change behaviours and perceptions around sight loss. It has been involved with several large-scale campaigns including calls for action to create a safer and more inclusive public transport system. In 2023, the charity played a key role in a national campaign to scrap plans to close ticket offices in train stations. In 2022, the charity launched its largest-ever advertising campaign, See the person, not the sight loss, to raise awareness of sight loss and the support that people who have visual impairments might need. Along with other leading health charities, RNIB lobbied throughout 2023 for better disability support across the National Health Service (NHS).

The RNIB's "Out of Sight" campaign argues for greater priority to be attached to vision rehabilitation services. An RNIB report published in 2025, Life on Pause, used Freedom of Information Act requests for local authority data covering 2023/24 and found that over 80% of English local authorities had delays in starting assessments for visual rehabilitation and in one fifth of local authorities, people waited for more than one year before service provision began.

The charity has campaigned for mandatory secret ballots for people with visual impairments. After the 2024 general election RNIB delivered an open letter to 10 Downing Street highlighting that according to its research roughly 87% of the UK's citizens with visual impairments were denied their right to vote in secret. The campaign follows a 2019 court judgement that declared the UK's current voting arrangements for people with blindness or visual impairments to be unlawful. RNIB pointed out that in spite of the judgement, the majority of the UK's visually impaired voters do so using technology that requires them to be accompanied into the voting booth and have their choices read aloud by an assistant. As of 2024 only one person living with blindness in the UK has voted in secret, using a device known as the McGonagle Reader. This comprises an audio player with headphones and a plastic template to locate the boxes on the paper.

== Controversies ==
=== Alleged sexual abuse ===
In 2018, the Charity Commission for England and Wales launched an inquiry into RNIB following serious allegations of systemic failings within the organisation and reports of abusive and sexually abusive practices at the Pears Centre for Specialist Learning. In 2020, the Commission ruled that there had been significant management, oversight, and staffing shortcomings which had led to repeated incidents where young people in the charity's care were put at risk or harmed. The Charity Commission's chief executive described this investigation as "one of the worst examples we have uncovered of poor governance and oversight having a direct impact on vulnerable people." The Commission stated that RNIB's corporate stewardship of services for children with complex needs fell far short of expectations and that the charity's board had been focused on narrow regulatory compliance and dismissive of criticism from the regulatory organisations it was accountable to – the Care Quality Commission and Ofsted. It found failures in training, safeguarding, record-keeping, reporting, responding to complaints, and the administration of medication, as well as instances of harm.

It was then reported that RNIB was selling all eighteen of its care homes and schools. The Charity Commission gave RNIB an official warning and required it to overhaul its governance, management and culture. In light of RNIB's progress in fulfilling the action plan, the Charity Commission withdrew its adverse decision in June 2022.

==== Ofsted inquiry ====
A 2017 Ofsted report on the Pears Centre for Specialist Learning described its safeguarding procedures as ineffective. Ofsted described it as inadequate in three categories and requiring improvement in the other two. It highlighted failures in safeguarding the vulnerable children and in training staff to support them. Later that year, RNIB announced that it had been unable to make sufficient improvements and was closing the centre; RNIB's chief executive resigned.

== See also ==
- British Wireless for the Blind Fund
- National Library for the Blind
- RNIB Connect Radio
- RNIB Pears Centre for Specialist Learning
- Royal London Society for Blind People
- Royal National College for the Blind
- Tiresias (typeface)
- Visionary (charity)

== Bibliography ==
- Rose, June (1970). Changing Focus: the development of blind welfare in Britain. London: Hutchinson. ISBN 009100490X.
- Thomas, Mary G. (1957). The Royal National Institute for the Blind. London.
- Armitage (1886). The education and employment of the blind : what it has been, is and ought to be. London: Harrison and Sons.
- Catalogue (1915). Catalogue of Books, Music and Appliances to be obtained from The National Institute for the Blind (Formerly the British and Foreign Blind Association. London.
- RNIB (1939). A History of Blind Welfare in England and Wales. London: Royal National Institute of Blind People.
