= 2008 in the United Kingdom =

Events from the year 2008 in the United Kingdom.

== Incumbents ==
- Monarch – Elizabeth II
- Prime Minister – Gordon Brown (Labour)

== Events ==
=== January ===
- 17 January – The number of people affected by norovirus stomach bug in the UK reaches an estimated 3 million.
- 18 January – Last working of Tower Colliery, the last deep mine in the South Wales Valleys. The official closure is on 25 January.
- 24 January – Peter Hain resigns as Secretary of State for Work and Pensions over irregular donations.
- 30 January – Television presenter and writer Jeremy Beadle, 59, dies suddenly from pneumonia in London.
- 31 January
  - Conservative Party MP Derek Conway is suspended from the House of Commons for 10 days over payments made to his son from his parliamentary allowances.
  - Four men are jailed for 15 years each for their part in the 2006 Securitas raid, the UK's biggest cash robbery.

=== February ===
- 18 February – Mohammed Al Fayed tells the inquest into the death of Diana, Princess of Wales that she and his son Dodi Fayed were both murdered in a conspiracy arranged by the Royal family, Tony Blair, MI5, MI6 and the British ambassador to France. He claims that Diana knew that The Prince of Wales and The Duke of Edinburgh were "trying to get rid of her".
- 19 February
  - Shannon Matthews, 9, from Dewsbury, West Yorkshire, is reported missing.
  - The inquest into the death of Diana, Princess of Wales hears from Dodi Fayed's former assistant Melissa Henning that Diana voiced fears shortly before her death that someone was going to make an attempt on her and Fayed's life in a conspiracy that would be made to look like an accident.
- 21 February – A jury at Ipswich Crown Court finds Steve Wright, 49, guilty of murdering five prostitutes during late 2006.
- 22 February
  - Nationalisation of Northern Rock: Northern Rock bank is nationalised by the British government.
  - Steve Wright is sentenced to life imprisonment with a recommendation that he should never be released.
  - Mark Dixie, 37, is found guilty of the September 2005 murder of Surrey model Sally Anne Bowman, 18. He is sentenced to life imprisonment at the Old Bailey, where the trial judge recommends that he serve at least 34 years before parole can be considered.
- 25 February – The animated children's television series The Mr. Men Show first airs on Five.
- 26 February
  - Levi Bellfield, 38, is found guilty of murdering two women in London in sexually motivated attacks; the first in 2001, the second in 2004. He receives a life sentence with a recommendation that he should never be released.
  - The inquest into the Death of Diana, Princess of Wales finds that MI6 did not keep files on Diana or Dodi Fayed, contradicting claims in conspiracy theories that the deaths were the result of an MI6 conspiracy.
- 27 February – 2008 Lincolnshire earthquake: An earthquake with an epicentre in Lincolnshire is felt across most of Britain, with several buildings suffering substantial damage.

=== March ===
- 7 March – The coroner at the inquest into the death of Diana, Princess of Wales announces that the Duke of Edinburgh will not be called into court to give evidence over the deaths that Mohammed Al Fayed is accusing him of ordering.
- 12 March – The 2008 budget is unveiled by Alistair Darling as his first in the position of Chancellor of the Exchequer.
- 14 March – Michael Donovan, 39, from Batley Carr, West Yorkshire, is arrested for the kidnap of 9-year-old Shannon Matthews.
- 28 March – London Heathrow Terminal 5 opens at Heathrow Airport to British Airways with many problems with the IT system, coupled with insufficient testing and staff training, which causes over 500 flights to be cancelled.
- 30 March – Farnborough air crash: A Cessna 501 Citation crashes into a row of houses in Farnborough, London, killing two pilots and three passengers.
- 31 March – The inquest into the death of Diana, Princess of Wales hears that there is "not a shred of evidence" that the Duke of Edinburgh or MI6 ordered her death.

=== April ===
- 2 April – An embryo that is a cross between a human and a cow survives a third straight day after being fertilised at Newcastle University. A director for embryonic stem cell laboratories at the Australian Stem Cell Centre says that the "99 per cent human" embryo could improve research within the field of human diseases. The Catholic Church of England and Wales says that the creation is "monstrous" and that its later destruction is unethical.
- 6 April – The Corporate Manslaughter and Corporate Homicide Act 2007 comes into force.
- 7 April – The inquest into the death of Diana, Princess of Wales records a verdict of accidental death, caused by the heavy drinking, drug abuse and speeding of her chauffeur Henri Paul, who died in the crash along with Diana and Dodi Fayed.
- 8 April – Karen Matthews, the mother of kidnapped 9-year-old girl Shannon Matthews, is arrested for organising her daughter's kidnap.
- 25 April – Jazz legend and humorist Humphrey Lyttelton dies aged 86 in London, and floral tributes are left by the public at Mornington Crescent tube station.

=== May ===
- 1 May
  - The 2008 London mayoral election is held. The Conservative candidate, Boris Johnson, defeats the incumbent Labour mayor Ken Livingstone.
  - The 2008 London Assembly election also takes place, with Brent and Harrow being the only constituency to change hands. Meanwhile, the British National Party gain a seat, their first outside local councils.
  - Local elections are held in England and Wales. The governing Labour Party fall to third place in the popular vote on 24%, behind the Conservatives on 44% and the Liberal Democrats on 25%.
- 11 May – Manchester United secure their tenth Premier League title in 16 years with a 2–0 win at Wigan Athletic on the final day of the league season. Ryan Giggs, who scored one of United's goals, becomes the first player to win 10 English league titles.
- 15 May – Halifax Town A.F.C., a former Football League side, are expelled from the Conference National with multimillion-pound debts.
- 17 May – The FA Cup Final takes place at Wembley Stadium between Portsmouth and Cardiff City with Portsmouth winning 1–0.
- 20 May – Joey Barton, a player for Newcastle United Football Club, is sentenced to six months in prison after being convicted of assault and affray.
- 21 May – The first all-English European Cup final sees Manchester United beat Chelsea on penalties after a 1–1 draw in Moscow's Luzhniki Stadium.
- 22 May – Construction work begins on the Olympic Stadium being built for the 2012 games in London.

=== June ===
- 4 June – Gretna F.C., just relegated from the Scottish Premier League, goes out of business with debts of £4 million.
- 12 June – Halifax Town, who were in the Blue Square Premier League until their recent expulsion due to financial problems, go out of business after 97 years. They were members of the Football League for most of their history until 2002.
- 13 June – Shadow Home Secretary David Davis resigns as an MP over the government's plans to detain terror suspects for up to 42 days. He will re-contest his seat in a by-election.

=== July ===
- July – Further bad news for the economy shows that it contracted by 0.1% in the second quarter of this year – ending 16 years of unbroken economic growth.
- 11 July – 2008 Haltemprice and Howden by-election: Former Shadow Home Secretary David Davis retains his seat with a 71.6% vote share. A record 26 candidates contest the by-election.
- 18 July – The surge in Conservative support continues as the latest MORI poll puts them 20 points ahead of Labour on 47%. With an election due within the next two years and possibly next year, David Cameron is well on course to become the next prime minister of the United Kingdom. With an economic crisis beginning and fears of a recession and mass unemployment rising, it is widely expected that his popularity will continue to grow.
- 22 July – The London Motor Show is held, a highlight being Vauxhall's launch of its new Insignia that will replace the Vectra. The Insignia is due on sale later in the year.

=== August ===
- 1 August – Barry George is acquitted of the murder of Jill Dando.
- 3 August – British motorcyclist Craig Jones is involved in a serious accident during the 2008 Supersport World Championship at Brands Hatch, dying of his injuries the following day aged just 23.
- 8–24 August – Great Britain compete at the Olympics in Beijing. The team win 19 gold, 13 silver and 15 bronze medals and finish fourth in the medal table, the best performance for the Great Britain team in a century.
- 17 August – A light aircraft approaching Coventry collides with a microlight, all five people on board the two aircraft are killed.
- 19 August – Following legal depositions at Birmingham Crown Court, Judge Frank Chapman rules that Anthony Hall, charged with the 1961 murder of Jacqueline Thomas should not stand trial for the crime, and that the charge should be stayed because it was "just too long ago", and Hall would not receive a fair and balanced trial.
- 21 August – The Home Office announces that an investigation will be launched after a consultancy firm lost the data of 84,000 prisoners and 43,000 criminals.

=== September ===
- 6 September – Eight people are killed when storms hit the UK causing flash flooding in many areas.
- 6–17 September – Great Britain compete at the Paralympics in Beijing.
- 12 September – Labour MP Siobhain McDonagh is dismissed from her role as an assistant government whip after publicly announcing that she had written to Labour's General Secretary calling for a leadership contest at the forthcoming party conference.
- 14 September – Amid the 2008 financial crisis, rise in unemployment and threat of recession, the Labour government's popularity is reported to have fallen dramatically. In January, they had a lead of up to 10 points over the Conservatives in the opinion polls, but the latest Ipsos MORI poll puts them 16 points behind the Conservative Party, who now have a 45% approval rating.
- 16 September – Minister of State for Scotland David Cairns resigns after writing to Prime Minister Gordon Brown requesting a leadership debate.
- 24 September – Labour's Secretary of State for Transport Ruth Kelly resigns stating the need to spend more time with her family.

=== October ===
- October
  - St Hilda's College, Oxford, ceases to be the last single-sex full college of the University of Oxford by admitting men.
  - Toyota launch another Avensis at the 2008 Paris Motor Show to be built at TMUK.
- 2 October – Metropolitan Police Commissioner Sir Ian Blair announces his resignation with effect from 1 December 2008, citing a lack of support from new Mayor of London Boris Johnson.
- 3 October – Peter Mandelson returns to the Westminster cabinet as Secretary of State for Business, Enterprise and Regulatory Reform as part of a reshuffle following Ruth Kelly's resignation.
- 6 October – Footballer Luke McCormick, a former goalkeeper for Plymouth Argyle, is sentenced to seven years in prison for causing death by dangerous driving.
- 8 October – The government announce a bank rescue package worth some £500 billion as a response to the 2008 financial crisis.
- 13 October – The House of Lords vote against a measure in the Counter-Terrorism Bill that would have enabled the government to detain suspects for up to 42 days without charge.
- 14 October – Key Stage 3 SATs tests are scrapped. The national curriculum tests for 13–14-year-olds were first introduced in 1991.
- 18 October – The Russell Brand Show prank calls row: An episode of The Russell Brand Show airs on BBC radio, featuring a series of prank telephone calls to the actor Andrew Sachs by comedians Russell Brand and Jonathan Ross, leading to large numbers of complaints, chiefly after an article in The Mail on Sunday the following week.
- 21 October – Nathaniel Rothschild accuses Conservative Shadow Chancellor George Osborne of soliciting to party funds a donation from Russian Oligarch Oleg Deripaska when they were both guests of Mr Rothschild in Corfu in August 2008. The allegations appear in a letter written by Mr Rothschild to The Times newspaper and are denied by George Osborne.
- 24 October – The Office for National Statistics reveal that Britain's economy shrunk by 0.5% in the quarter from July to September – the first quarterly detraction since 1992.
- 26 October
  - A severe storm in the Lake District causes extensive flooding while 2,500 runners are taking part in a fell race, but all participants are later accounted for.
  - A weak earthquake hits Hereford and Worcestershire, measuring 3.6 on the Richter scale.
- 27 October – Employment and Support Allowance (ESA) replaces new claims for Incapacity Benefit and Income Support on the basis of incapacity to work for most claimants.

=== November ===
- 2 November – Lewis Hamilton becomes the youngest ever Formula One World Champion in motor racing.
- 6 November – 2008 Glenrothes by-election: the Labour Party hold the seat.
- 18 November – The names and contact details of more than 12,000 members of the far-right British National Party are published online by a disgruntled activist, breaching data protection laws.
- 26 November – Planning Act 2008 is approved, creating an Infrastructure Planning Commission and the concept of nationally significant infrastructure projects.
- 25 November – Forced marriage protection orders become available in England, Wales and Northern Ireland under the terms of the Forced Marriage (Civil Protection) Act 2007.
- 27 November – Conservative Shadow Immigration Minister Damian Green is arrested on suspicion of conspiracy to commit misconduct in public office. He is released on bail after questioning.

=== December ===
- 4 December
  - Karen Matthews, 32, is convicted of the kidnapping her 9-year-old daughter, Shannon, in Dewsbury, West Yorkshire, on 19 February.
  - Lapland New Forest, a Christmas themed park in Dorset closes after scores of complaints about the poor quality of its attractions.
- 13 December – Actress Kathy Staff dies aged 80 at a nursing home in Ashton-under-Lyne.
- 16 December – Sean Mercer, 18, is found guilty of murdering 11-year-old Rhys Jones who was shot dead in Croxteth, Liverpool, in August last year. Mercer is sentenced to life imprisonment as the trial judge recommends that he serve at least 22 years before parole can be considered.
- 18 December
  - Woolworths announce their 807 UK stores will close by 5 January 2009, putting some 27,000 people out of work.
  - Robert Napper pleads guilty to killing Rachel Nickell, who was stabbed to death on Wimbledon Common on 15 July 1992.
- 19 December – MFI cease trading, closing all 111 of its furniture stores and leaving its 1,400 workforce redundant. The furniture retailer had been in business since 1964, and had used the MFI name since 1971.
- 27 December – The first wave of Woolworths store closures sees 200 stores shut their doors, with the closure to be completed in the new year unless a buyer for the company can be found in the next few days.

=== Undated ===
- January – VirtualGym TV is established.
- Replica, an online magazine is founded.
- Sales of new cars in Britain defy the deteriorating economic conditions, with well over 2.5 million sales this year compared to barely 2.4 million last year. The Ford Focus enjoys its tenth successive year as Britain's best selling new car.

== Publications ==
- Iain M. Banks' novel Matter.
- Sebastian Faulks' James Bond novel Devil May Care.
- Jacqueline Walker's part family memoir, part novelisation, Pilgrim State.

== Births ==
- 11 February – Frankel, racehorse
- 25 February – Louie Tully, YouTuber
- 7 July – Sky Brown, Olympic park skateboarder (in Japan)
- 31 December - Evie Templeton, actress

== Deaths ==
=== January ===
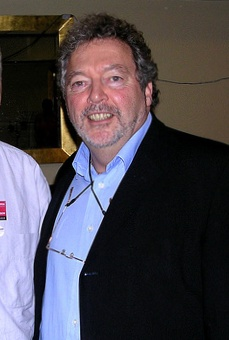
Jeremy Beadle

- 2 January – George MacDonald Fraser, author (born 1925)
- 3 January
  - Natasha Collins, actress and model (overdose) (born 1976)
  - Jimmy Stewart, racing driver (born 1931)
- 4 January – Graham Percy, artist (born 1938 in New Zealand)
- 7 January – Raffaello de Banfield, composer (born 1922)
- 9 January – John Harvey-Jones, businessman (born 1924)
- 15 January
  - John D. Lawson, scientist (born 1923)
  - Jason MacIntyre, racing cyclist (road accident) (born 1973)
- 17 January
  - Tony Dean, racing driver (born 1932)
  - Carole Lynne, actress (born 1918)
- 18 January – Bertram James, World War II airman, survivor of The Great Escape (born 1915)
- 19 January – Morris Maddocks, bishop (born 1928)
- 21 January – Billy Elliott, footballer (born 1925)
- 22 January – Kevin Stoney, actor (born 1921)
- 25 January – Evelyn Barbirolli, oboist, wife of Sir John Barbirolli (born 1911)
- 26 January – Bryan Jennett, neurosurgeon (born 1926)
- 30 January
  - Jeremy Beadle, television presenter, writer and producer (born 1948)
  - Miles Kington, journalist and humorist (born 1941)

=== February ===
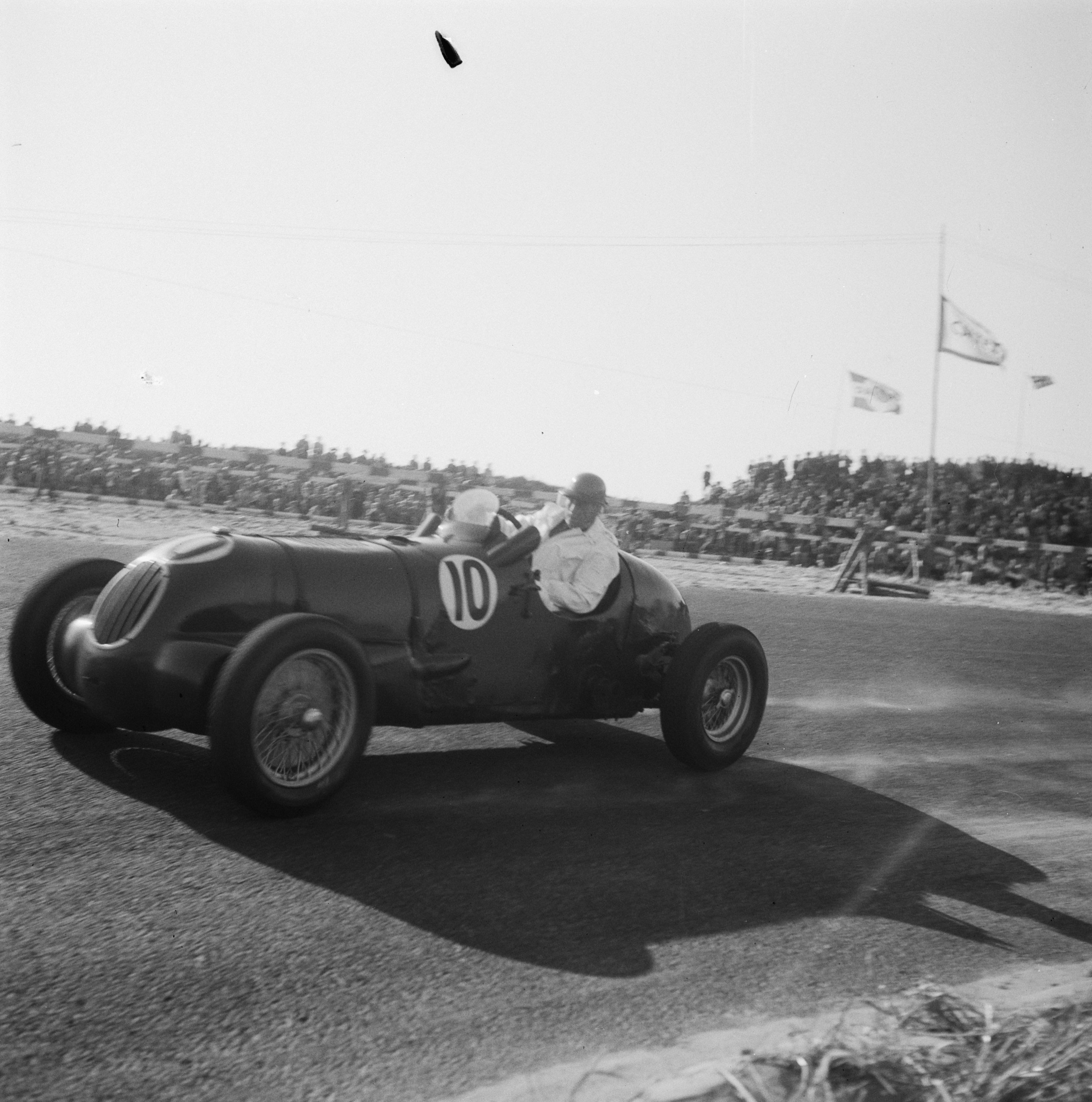
Tony Rolt

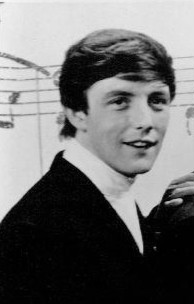
Mike Smith

- 2 February – Edward Wilson, actor (born 1947)
- 4 February
  - Rose Hacker, writer and activist (born 1906)
  - Peter Thomas, Baron Thomas of Gwydir, politician (born 1920)
- 6 February
  - Oliver Foot, actor (born 1946)
  - Tony Rolt, racing driver and soldier, last surviving participant of the world's first World Championship Grand Prix (born 1918)
- 7 February
  - Andrew Bertie, Grand Master of the Sovereign Military Order of Malta (born 1929)
  - Tamara Desni, German-born actress (born 1913)
- 8 February – Jane Lumb, model and actress (born 1942)
- 10 February – Chris Townson, musician (John's Children) (born 1947)
- 12 February – Geoffrey Lewis, professor of Turkish at the University of Oxford (born 1920)
- 18 February – Jack Lyons, financier and philanthropist (born 1916)
- 19 February
  - Mary Barclay, actress (born 1916)
  - Emily Perry, actress (born 1907)
  - David Watkin, cinematographer (born 1925)
- 21 February
  - Archie Hind, novelist (born 1928)
  - Sunny Lowry, Channel swimmer (born 1911)
- 22 February – Steve Whitaker, artist (born 1955)
- 24 February – Pearl Witherington, World War II secret agent (born 1914)
- 28 February – Mike Smith, pop singer (The Dave Clark Five) (born 1943)

=== March ===
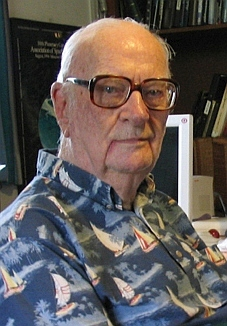
Arthur C. Clarke

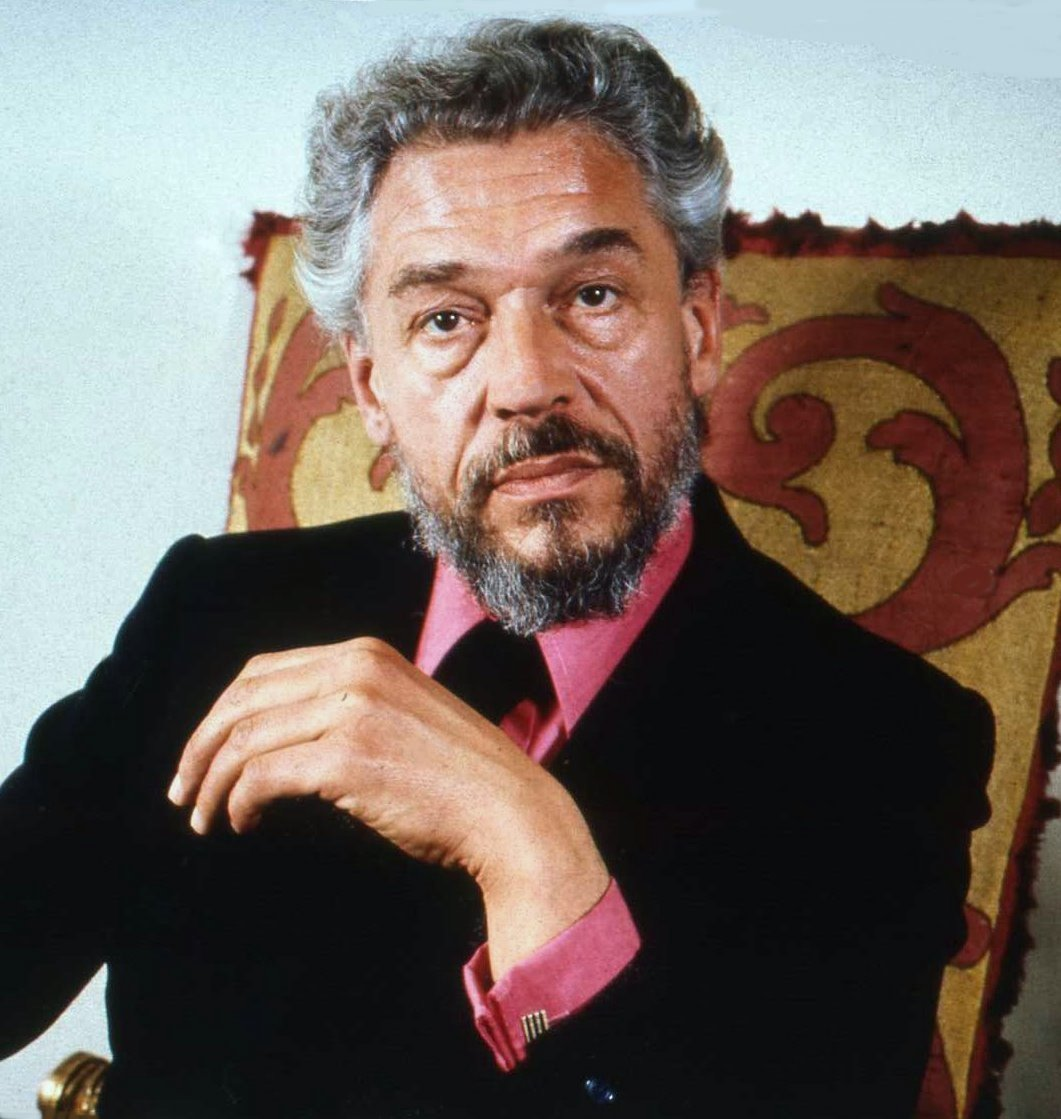
Paul Scofield

- 2 March – Paul Raymond, publisher and property developer (born 1925)
- 3 March – Norman Smith, singer and record producer (The Beatles, Pink Floyd) (born 1923)
- 7 March
  - Leon Greenman, anti-fascist campaigner and author, only British survivor of Auschwitz (born 1910)
  - Francis Pym, politician (born 1922)
- 8 March – Carol Barnes, newsreader (born 1944)
- 11 March
  - Alun Hoddinott, Welsh composer (born 1929)
  - Michael J. Todd, police officer, Chief Constable of Greater Manchester Police (born 1957)
- 12 March – Tom Tuohy, chemist, averted potential disaster at Windscale (born 1917)
- 16 March – John Hewer, actor (born 1922)
- 18 March
  - Andrew Britton, novelist (born 1981)
  - Anthony Minghella, film director (born 1954)
- 19 March
  - Sir Arthur C. Clarke, science fiction author and inventor (born 1917)
  - Philip Jones Griffiths, photojournalist (born 1936)
  - Paul Scofield, actor (born 1922)
- 20 March
  - Eric Ashton, rugby player and coach (born 1935)
  - Brian Wilde, actor (born 1927)
- 21 March – Denis Cosgrove, geographer (born 1948)
- 23 March – Neil Aspinall, record producer and business executive (born 1941)
- 25 March – Tony Church, actor (born 1930)
- 28 March – Michael Podro, art historian (born 1931)
- 29 March – Allan Ganley, jazz drummer (born 1931)
- 30 March
  - David Leslie, racing driver (born 1953; killed in the Farnborough air crash)
  - Richard Lloyd, racing driver (born 1945; killed in the Farnborough air crash)

=== April ===
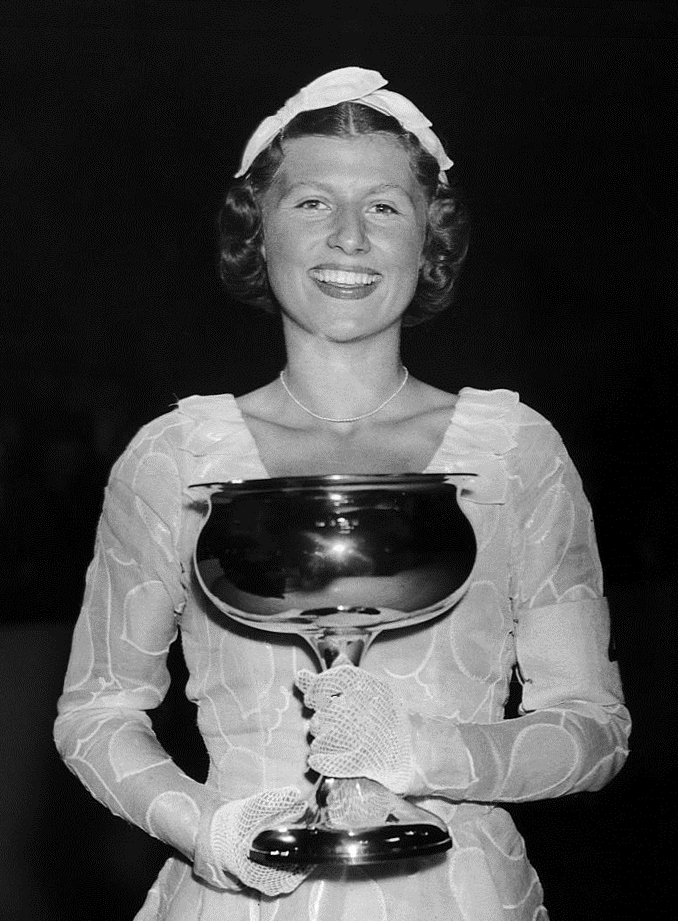
Cecilia Colledge

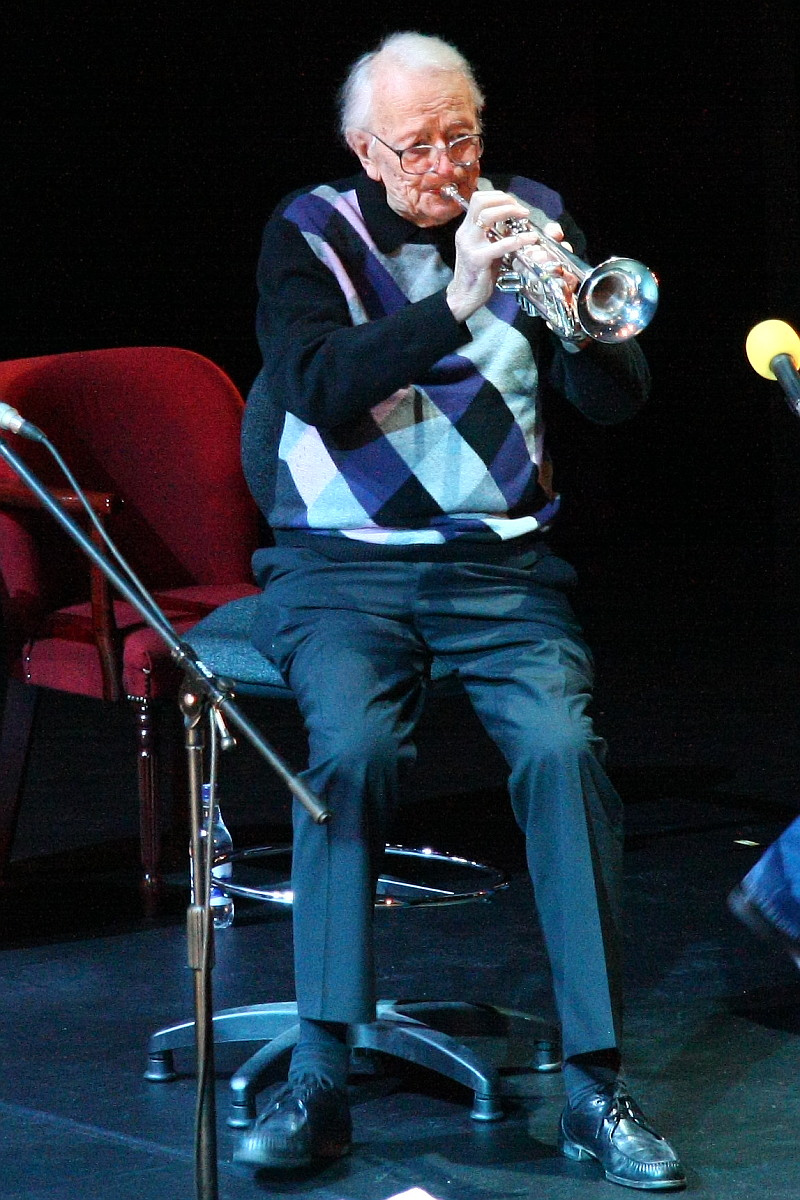
Humphrey Lyttelton

- 1 April – Jim Finney, football referee (born 1924)
- 2 April – Paul Arden, author (born 1940)
- 3 April – Andrew Crozier, poet (born 1943)
- 7 April – Mark Speight, television presenter (suicide) (born 1965)
- 8 April
  - Tim Beaumont, Baron Beaumont of Whitley, politician and clergyman (born 1928)
  - Graham Higman, mathematician (born 1917)
- 10 April
  - Francis Coleman, orchestral conductor (born 1924, Canada)
  - Dickson Mabon, politician (born 1925)
- 11 April
  - Willoughby Goddard, actor (born 1926)
  - Joan Jackson (née Hunter Dunn), muse of poet John Betjeman (born 1915)
- 12 April – Cecilia Colledge, Olympic figure skater (born 1920)
- 15 April
  - Hazel Court, actress (born 1926)
  - Brian Davison, drummer (The Nice) (born 1942)
- 17 April
  - Richard Chopping, illustrator (James Bond) (born 1917)
  - Gwyneth Dunwoody, politician (born 1930)
- 18 April – Michael de Larrabeiti, author (born 1934)
- 24 April – Tristram Cary, composer (born 1925)
- 25 April – Humphrey Lyttelton, jazz musician and broadcaster (born 1921)
- 28 April
  - Diana Barnato Walker, aviator, first British woman to break the sound barrier (born 1918)
  - Sir Derek Higgs, banker and businessman (born 1944)
- 29 April – Sir Anthony Kershaw, politician (born 1915)

=== May ===
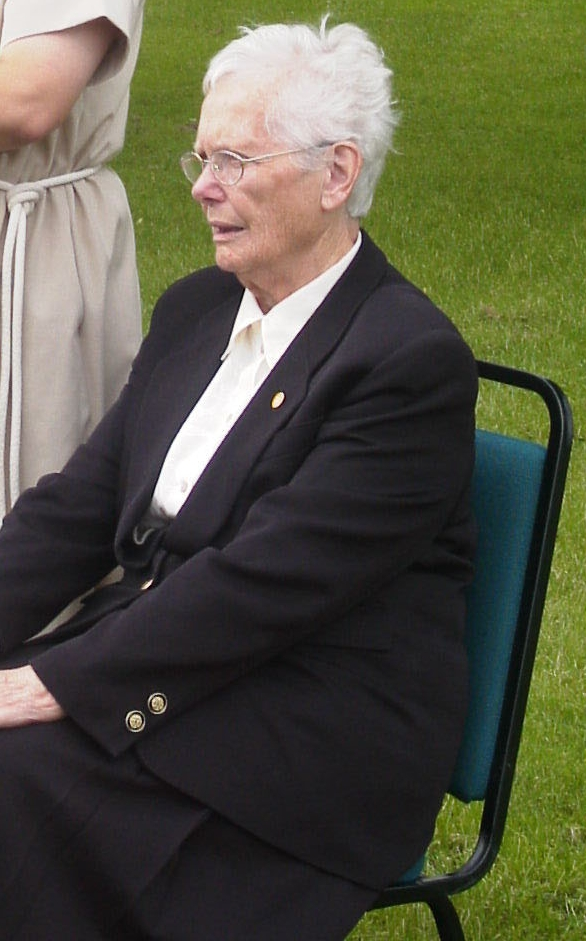
Mary Berry

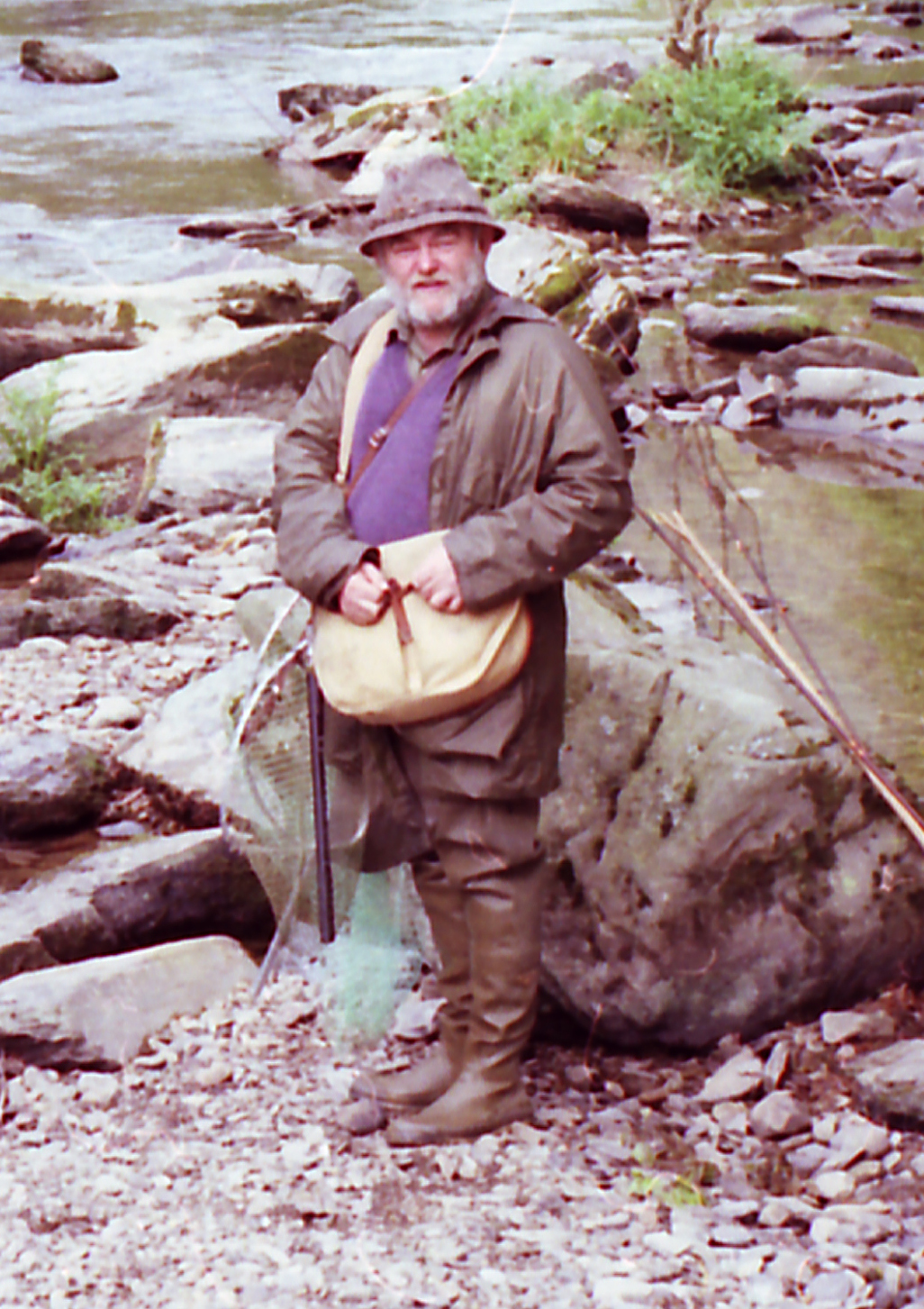
Peter Rolfe Vaughan

- 1 May
  - Bernard Archard, actor (born 1916)
  - Mary Berry, musicologist and nun (born 1917)
- 2 May – Marion Simmons (born 1949)
- 10 May – John Barraclough, air marshal (born 1918)
- 13 May – Jill Adams, actress (born 1930)
- 14 May
  - Frith Banbury, actor and theatre director (born 1912)
  - Derek Goodwin, ornithologist (born 1920)
  - John Forbes-Robertson, actor (born 1928)
- 15 May – Robert Dunlop, motorcycle racer (accident during practice) (born 1960)
- 16 May
  - David Mitton, producer and director (born 1939)
  - Peter Rolfe Vaughan, engineer (born 1935)
- 17 May
  - Jolyon Brettingham Smith, composer and radio presenter (born 1949)
  - Wilfrid Mellers, composer and music critic (born 1914)
- 18 May – Tom Burlison, Baron Burlison, footballer and trade unionist (born 1936)
- 22 May – Paul Patrick, gay rights campaigner (born 1950)
- 23 May – Nigel Anderson, soldier, landowner and politician (born 1920, Australia)
- 24 May – Rob Knox, actor (born 1989)
- 27 May – David Butler, screenwriter (born 1927)
- 28 May
  - Beryl Cook, artist (born 1926)
  - Elinor Lyon, children's writer (born 1921)
- 30 May
  - Rodney Gordon, architect (born 1933)
  - Nat Temple, bandleader (born 1913)

=== June ===
- 1 June – Al Jones, folk singer-songwriter (born 1945)
- 4 June – Jonathan Routh, co-star of Candid Camera (born 1927)
- 5 June – Frank Blackmore, traffic engineer, inventor of the mini-roundabout (born 1916)
- 6 June – Trevor Wilkinson, sports car manufacturer, founder of TVR (born 1923)
- 10 June – David Brierly, actor (born 1935)
- 13 June
  - Bruce Lester, actor (born 1912, South Africa)
  - John Malcolm, actor (born 1936)
  - Dennis Weatherstone, businessman and banker (born 1930)
- 17 June – Henry Chadwick, theologian (born 1920)
- 19 June
  - David Caminer, computer pioneer (born 1915)
  - Bomber Wells, cricketer (born 1930)
- 21 June – Freddie Williams, businessman (born 1942)
- 26 June – Tony Melody, actor (born 1922)

=== July ===
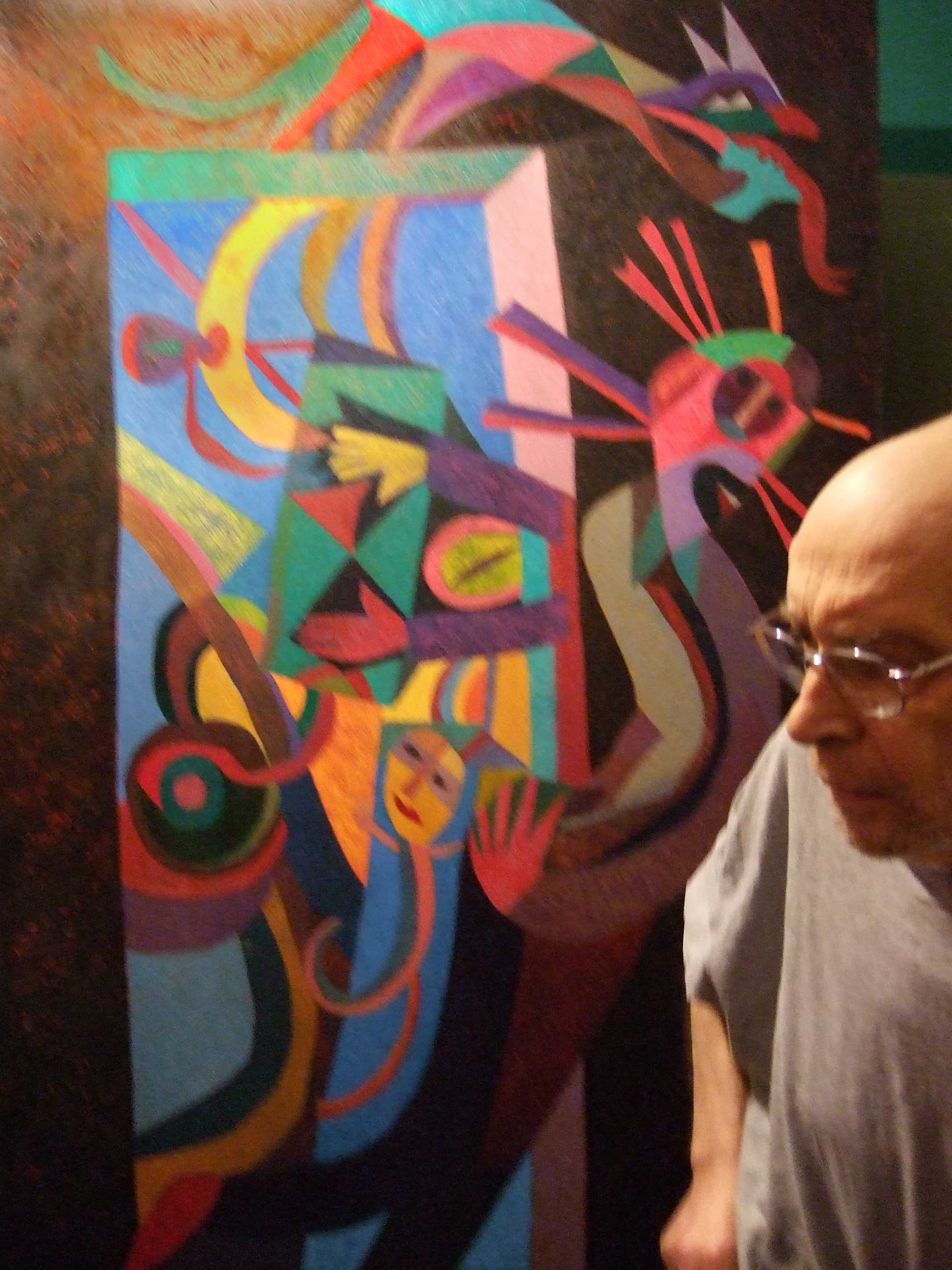
Dave Pearson

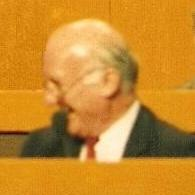
Russell Johnston

- 1 July
  - Mel Galley, guitarist (born 1948)
  - Robert Harling, typographer (born 1910)
- 2 July – Elizabeth Spriggs, actress (born 1929)
- 3 July
  - Ernie Cooksey, footballer (born 1980)
  - Clive Hornby, actor (born 1944)
- 4 July – Charles Wheeler, journalist (born 1923)
- 7 July – Fred Yates, painter (born 1922)
- 13 July – John Raymond Hobbs, pathologist (born 1929)
- 14 July
  - Bryan Cowgill, television executive (born 1927)
  - Hugh Lloyd, actor (born 1923)
- 17 July – John Hunt, Baron Hunt of Tanworth, civil servant (born 1919)
- 19 July
  - Sarah Conlon, Northern Irish campaigner on behalf of Guildford Four and Maguire Seven (born 1926)
  - Ann Lambton, historian (born 1912)
  - Dave Pearson, painter (born 1937)
- 21 July – Donald Stokes, Baron Stokes, industrialist, chief executive of British Leyland (1968–1975) (born 1914)
- 26 July – Chas Messenger, cyclist (born 1914)
- 27 July
  - Graeme Crallan, heavy metal drummer (White Spirit) (fall) (born 1958)
  - Russell Johnston, politician (born 1932)
- 29 July – Eric Varley, politician (born 1932)
- 30 July – Peter Coke, actor (born 1913)

=== August ===
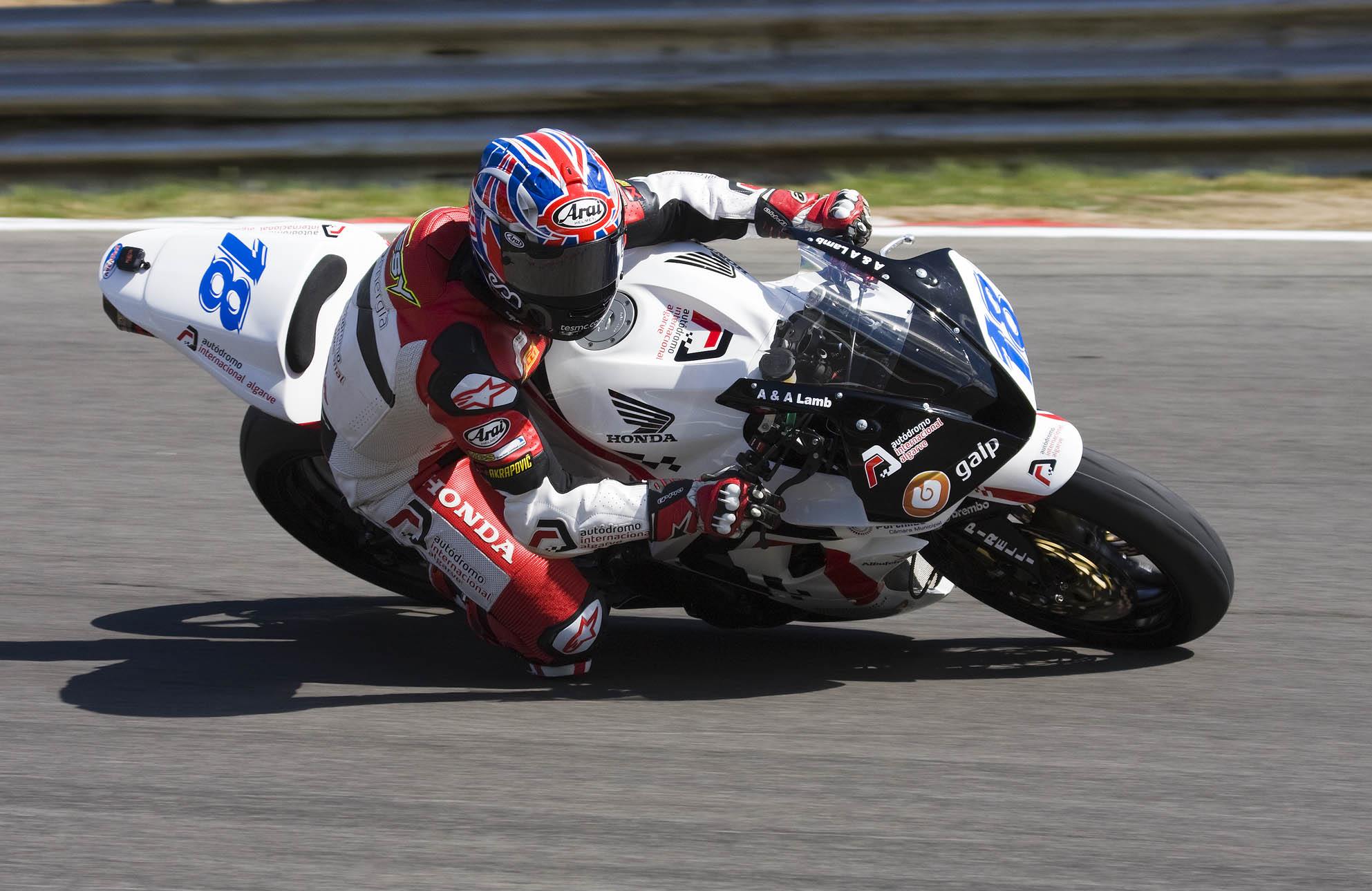
Craig Jones

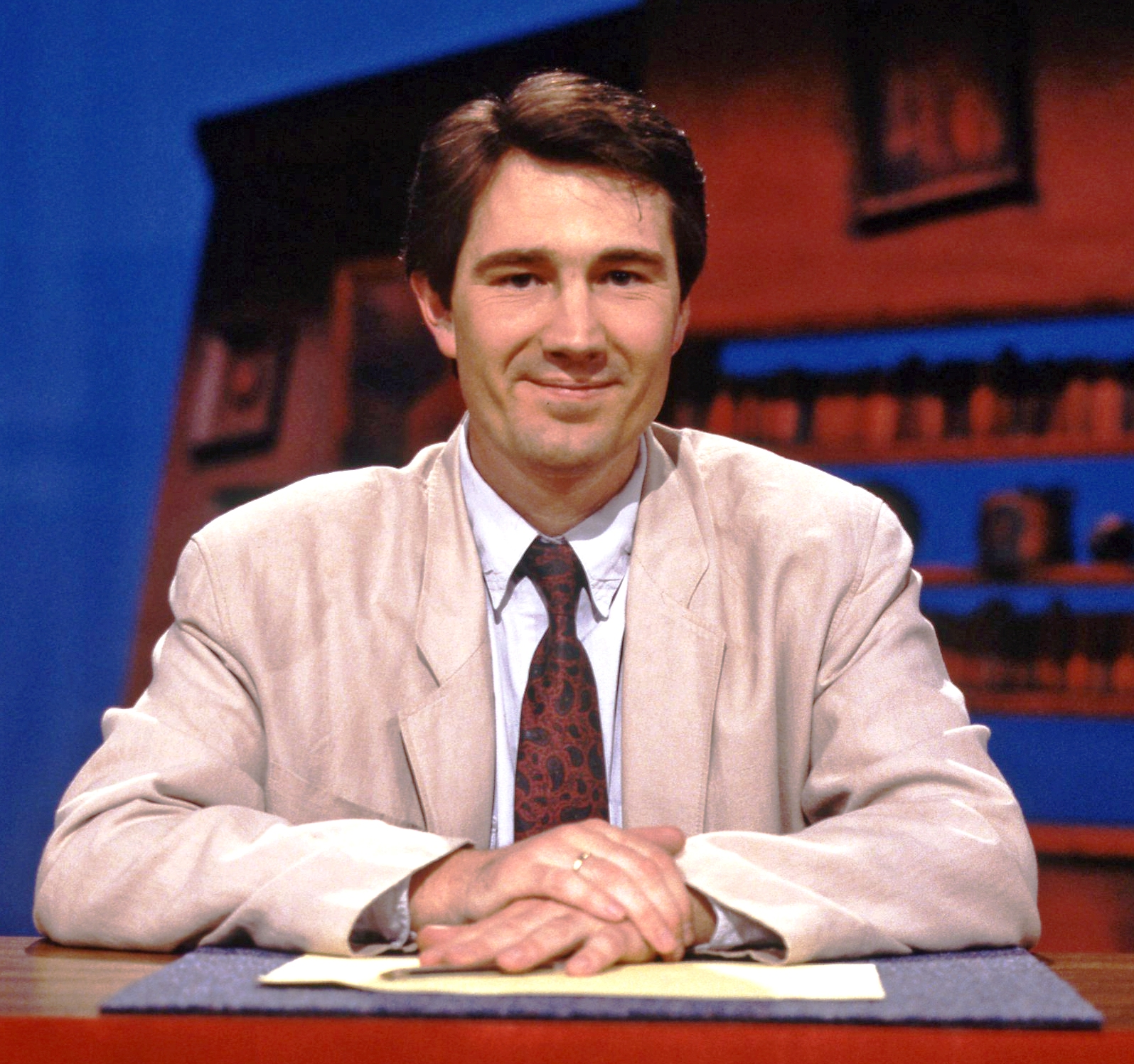
Geoffrey Perkins

- 1 August – Pauline Baynes, artist (born 1922)
- 3 August – Roger Dean, guitarist (born 1943)
- 4 August – Craig Jones, motorcycle racer (accident) (born 1985)
- 6 August – Simon Gray, playwright (born 1936)
- 9 August
  - Peter Coe, athletics coach, father of Sebastian Coe (born 1919)
  - Archie Elliott, Lord Elliott, judge (born 1922)
- 10 August – Terence Rigby, actor (born 1937)
- 11 August – Sir Bill Cotton, producer (born 1928)
- 12 August – Michael Baxandall, art historian (born 1933)
- 13 August – John MacDougall, politician (born 1947)
- 14 August
  - Sandy Bruce-Lockhart, Baron Bruce-Lockhart, politician (born 1942)
  - Lita Roza, singer (born 1926)
- 18 August – Bob Humphrys, broadcaster, brother of John Humphrys (born 1952)
- 19 August – Leo Abse, lawyer and politician (born 1917)
- 20 August – Eric Longworth, actor (born 1918)
- 25 August – John Thoday, geneticist (born 1916)
- 29 August – Geoffrey Perkins, comedy producer, writer and performer (born 1953)
- 31 August – Ken Campbell, actor and raconteur (born 1941)

=== September ===
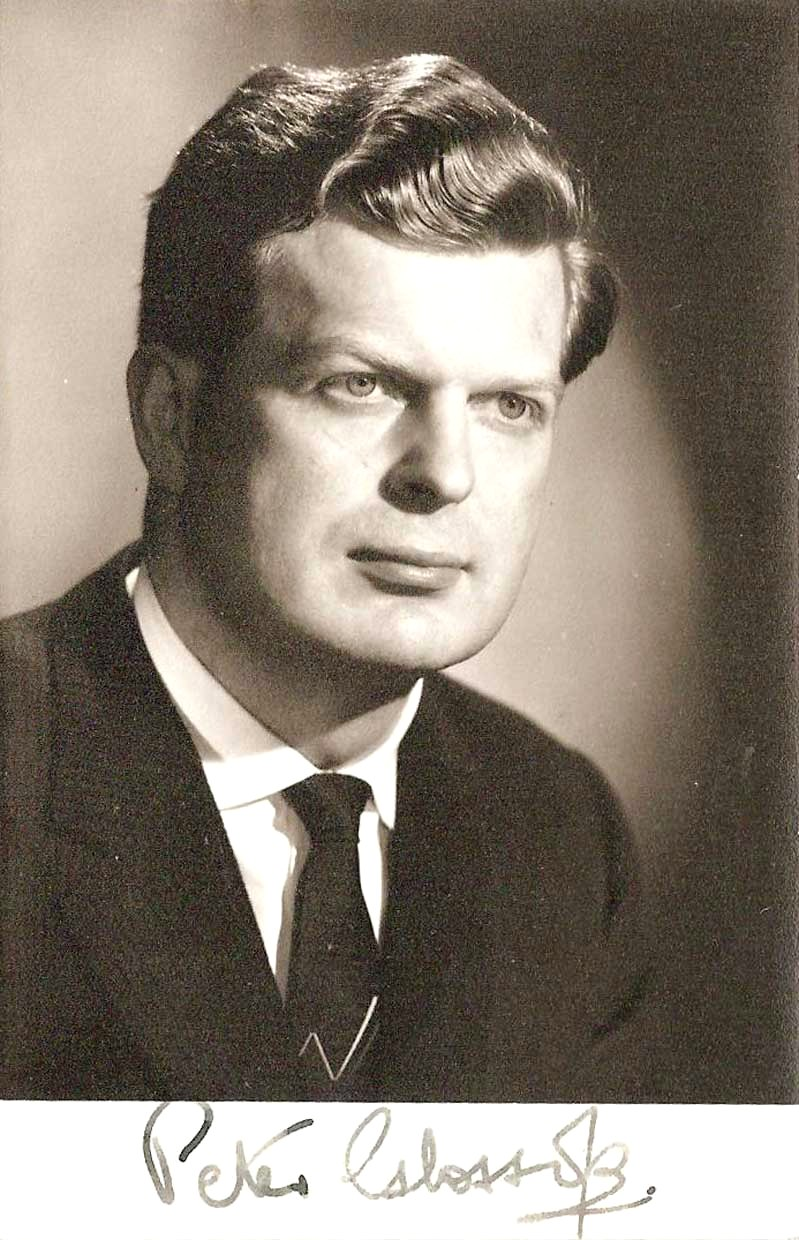
Peter Glossop

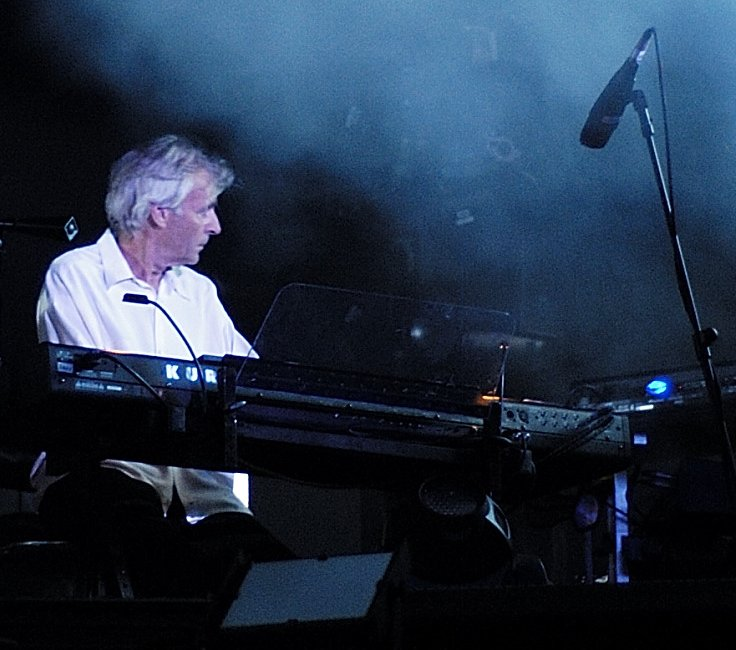
Richard Wright

- 1 September – Ian Edward Fraser, World War II sailor and VC recipient (born 1920)
- 2 September
  - Dame Alison Munro, civil servant and headmistress (born 1914)
  - Julia Pirie, spy (born 1918)
  - Denis Rooke, engineer (born 1924)
- 7 September – Peter Glossop, opera singer (born 1928)
- 9 September
  - Nina Lawson, wig-maker for the Metropolitan Opera (born 1926)
  - Bheki Mseleku, jazz musician (born 1955, South Africa)
- 10 September
  - David Chipp, journalist (born 1927)
  - Vernon Handley, orchestral conductor (born 1930)
  - Gary O'Donnell, soldier (killed in Afghanistan) (born 1968)
- 12 September – Marjorie Thomas, opera singer (born 1923)
- 14 September – Ralph Russell, scholar (born 1918)
- 15 September – Richard Wright, pianist (Pink Floyd) and songwriter (born 1943)
- 16 September – John Fancy, World War II airman (born 1913)
- 19 September
  - David Jones, film director (born 1934)
  - Dave Needham, boxer (born 1951)
- 20 September – William Fox, actor (born 1911, Philippines)
- 21 September – Brian Pippard, physicist (born 1920)
- 23 September – William Woodruff, historian (born 1916)
- 25 September – Jimmy Sirrel, footballer and football manager (Notts County) (born 1922)
- 29 September – Jock Wilson, World War II soldier and D-Day veteran (born 1903)

=== October ===
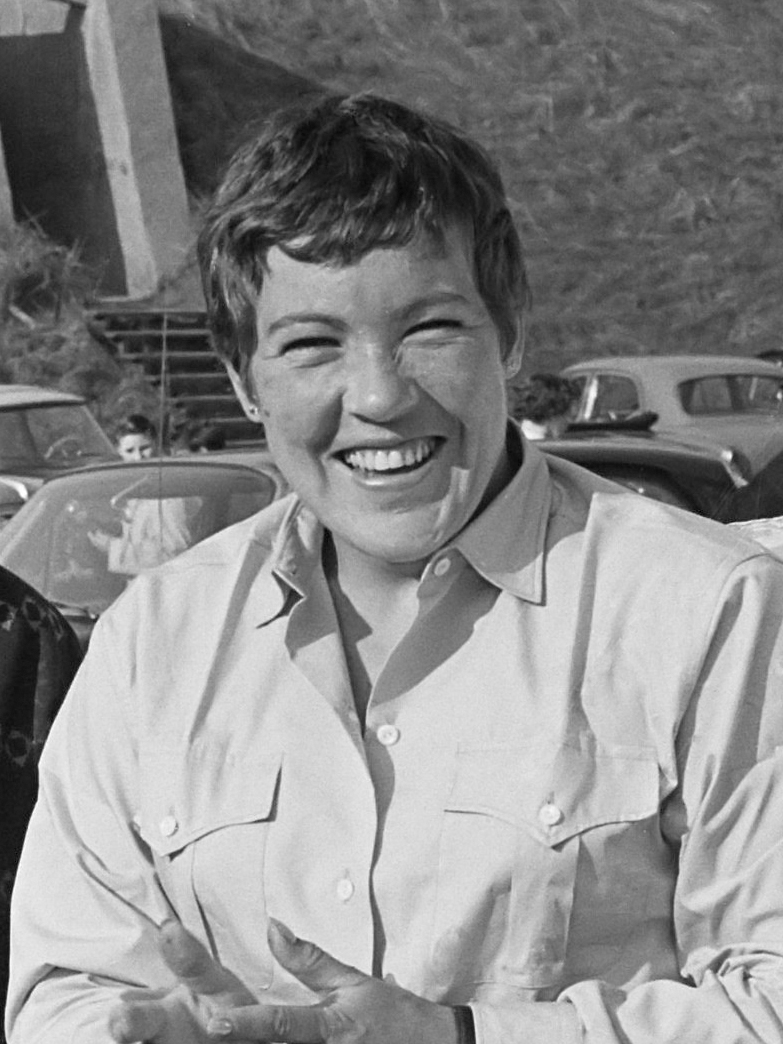
Pat Moss

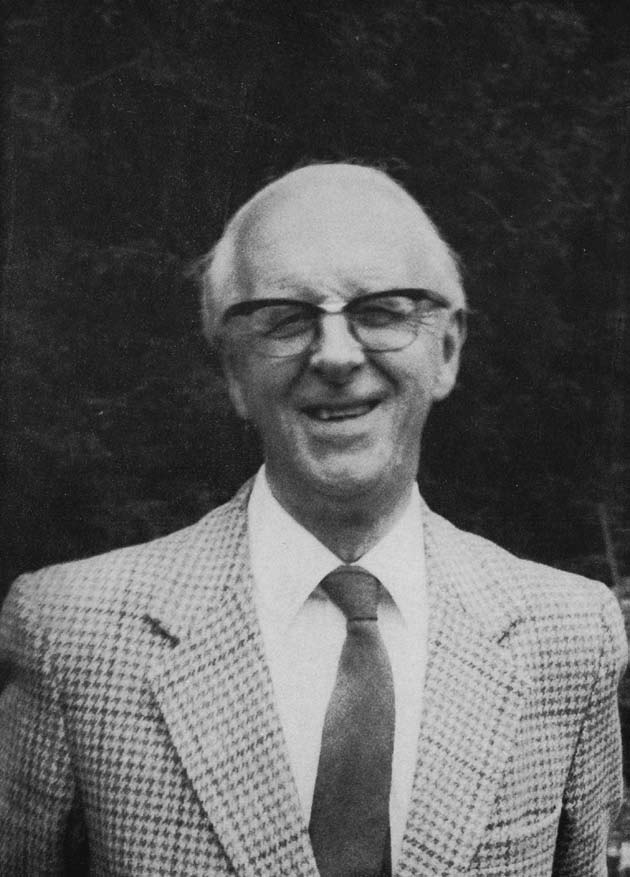
F. W. Walbank

- 3 October – George Thomson, Baron Thomson of Monifieth, journalist and politician (born 1921)
- 4 October
  - Ted Briggs, World War II sailor, last survivor of the sinking of HMS Hood (born 1923)
  - Peter Vansittart, writer (born 1920)
- 6 October – Peter Avery, scholar (born 1923)
- 7 October – Peter Copley, actor (born 1915)
- 8 October – Bob Friend, newscaster (born 1938)
- 11 October – Russ Hamilton, singer (born 1932)
- 13 October – Christopher Wicking, screenwriter (born 1943)
- 14 October
  - Barrington J. Bayley, science fiction writer (born 1937)
  - Ray Lowry, cartoonist (born 1944)
  - Pat Moss, racing driver, daughter of Alfred Moss (born 1934)
- 20 October
  - Pat Kavanagh, literary agent (born 1940, South Africa)
  - John Ringham, actor and playwright (born 1928)
- 23 October
  - Derek Brewer, mediaevalist (born 1923)
  - Kevin Finnegan, boxer (born 1948)
  - F. W. Walbank, scholar of Greek history (born 1909)
- 25 October
  - Ian McColl, footballer and football manager (born 1927)
  - Maurice Stonefrost, civil servant (born 1927)
- 27 October
  - Chris Bryant, screenwriter and actor (born 1936)
  - Roy Stewart, actor (born 1925, Jamaica)
- 31 October – John Pearse, guitarist (born 1939)

=== November ===
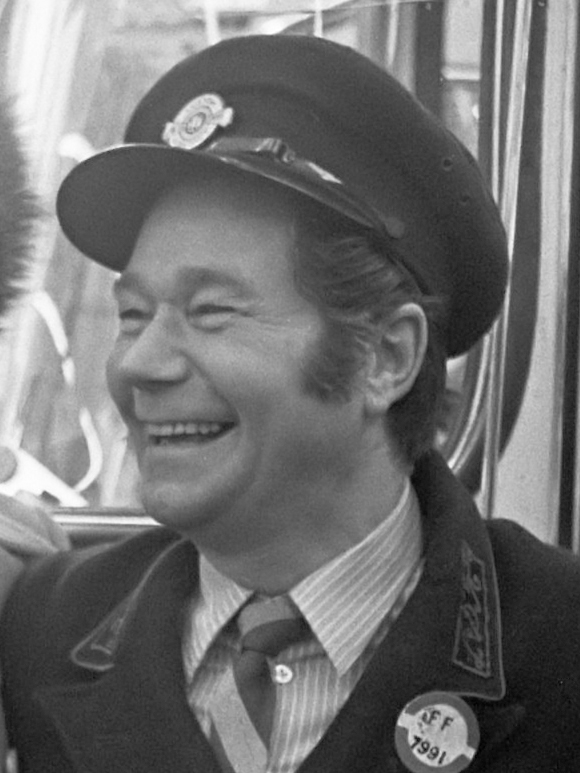
Reg Varney

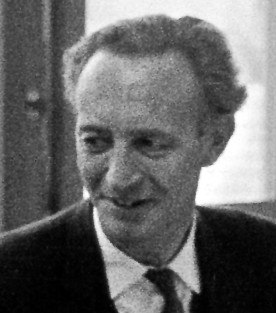
Leonard Goodwin

- 3 November
  - John Adams, World War II naval officer (born 1918)
  - Brooks Mileson, businessman (born 1947)
- 4 November – Syd Lucas, World War I survivor (born 1900)
- 5 November – Sir Paul Greening, naval officer and courtier (born 1928)
- 11 November – Jack Scott, television weather forecaster (born 1923)
- 12 November
  - Mitch Mitchell, drummer (born 1947)
  - Margaret Moncrieff, cellist (born 1921)
- 14 November – Sir Bernard Feilden, conservation architect (born 1919)
- 16 November – Reg Varney, actor (born 1916)
- 17 November – James Baddiley, microbiologist (born 1918)
- 23 November – Richard Hickox, orchestral conductor (born 1948)
- 25 November
  - Leonard Goodwin, pharmacologist (born 1915)
  - Michael Lee, rock drummer (born 1969)
  - Brian Pearce, Marxist historian and translator (born 1915)
  - Dudley Savage, radio presenter (born 1920)
- 26 November – Andreas Liveras, businessman (murdered in India) (born 1935, Cyprus)
- 28 November – Hugh Laddie, judge (born 1946)
- 29 November – Robert Wade, chess player (born 1921, New Zealand)
- 30 November – Naomi Datta, geneticist (born 1922)

=== December ===
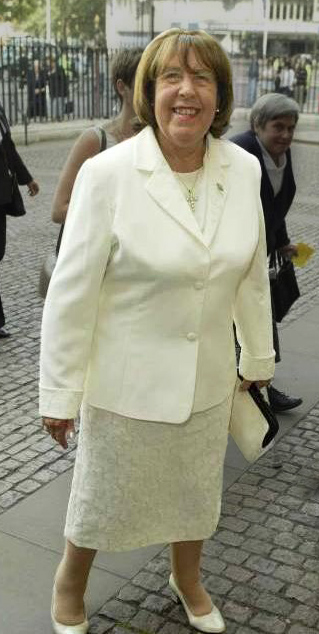
Kathy Staff

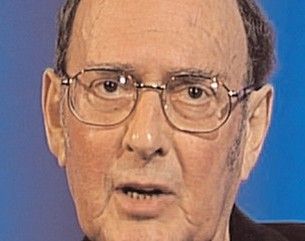
Harold Pinter

- 1 December
  - James Bree, actor (born 1923)
  - John Wall, lawyer and blind rights campaigner (born 1930)
- 2 December – Patrick Maitland, 17th Earl of Lauderdale, peer (born 1911)
- 3 December – Derek Wadsworth, jazz trombonist and composer (born 1939)
- 4 December – Richard Van Allan, opera singer (born 1935)
- 6 December – Sir Curtis Keeble, diplomat, Ambassador to the Soviet Union (1978–1982) (born 1922)
- 7 December – John Ellis Williams, Welsh author (born 1924)
- 8 December
  - Oliver Postgate, animator, puppeteer and writer (born 1925)
  - Bob Spiers, television director (born 1945)
- 13 December – Kathy Staff, actress (born 1928)
- 15 December – Davey Graham, guitarist (born 1950)
- 16 December – Richard Coleman, actor (born 1930)
- 18 December
  - Peter Malam Brothers, World War II pilot (born 1917)
  - Jack Douglas, actor (Carry On films) (born 1927)
  - Hannah Frank, sculptor (born 1908)
- 19 December – Sir Bernard Crick, political theorist (born 1929)
- 20 December – Adrian Mitchell, poet and novelist (born 1932)
- 23 December – Eric Wilson, lieutenant-colonel, last British Army recipient of the Victoria Cross from the Second World War (born 1912)
- 24 December – Harold Pinter, playwright (born 1930)
- 25 December – Colin White, military historian (born 1951)
- 27 December – Patricia Kneale, actress (born 1925)
- 28 December – Sir Michael Levey, art historian (born 1927)

== See also ==
- 2008 in British music
- 2008 in British television
- List of British films of 2008
