= New College Worcester =

Location
- Whittington Road; Worcester, Worcestershire, WR5 2JX; England; 52.17900°N 2.19100°W

Information
- Type: Non-maintained special school
- Established: 1866
- Department for Education URN: 117064 Tables
- Ofsted: Reports
- Principal: Rachel Perks
- Gender: Coeducational
- Age: 11 to 19
- Website: http://www.ncw.co.uk/

New College Worcester (or NCW; formerly RNIB New College) is an independent boarding and day school for students, aged 11–19, who are blind or partially sighted. It caters to around 80 students. It is located in the city of Worcester, England.

== History ==
In 1866 a special needs boarding school was established as Worcester College for the Blind Sons of Gentlemen, based first at The Commandery, the former English Civil War headquarters of King Charles II. In 1887, following a purchase of land by Eliza Warrington, Worcester College relocated to the village of Powick, then moving to its present location in Whittington Road, Worcester in 1902. New buildings were added in the 1930s, including the Baldwin wing, which included extra classrooms, dormitories, a gymnasium, and study rooms for fifth and sixth form students. In 1936, the British and Foreign Blind Association (which later became the RNIB) took over all financial responsibility for the school, until 2007 when NCW split from the RNIB. In 1944, an Act of Parliament (the Education Act 1944) recognised the establishment as an official grammar school for blind boys.

During the 1950s much construction work was undertaken at the Whittington Road site, including the building of an open-air swimming pool and a chapel, as well as major extension work (adding the science block to the main building). A second wing, opened by Princess Margaret in 1962 provided facilities for a new science laboratory and a craft and woodwork shop. A new chapel had been built at the same time. In the 1970s, the School's guest house, Fletcher, was purchased. This house has also been used as additional accommodation of CSVs (Community Service Volunteers) and its garden has in the past been developed for gardening.

The most extensive construction work took place in the 1980s following the merger with Chorleywood College for Girls with Little or No Sight. Around 2000 the new Learning Resources Centre (LRC) was opened adjoining the chapel and mathematics corridor - as well as giving a new school a production venue and computer resources. The LRC replaced the former library, which became the offices of the Senior Management Team (SMT). In 1987, Chorleywood College for Girls and Worcester College for the Blind closed. The two former establishments merged, taking up residence at Worcester College's site which was renamed RNIB New College Worcester and became coeducational.

In 2007, funding issues resulted in negotiations between the governors of the college and the RNIB, reaching a consensus that enabled the college to become an independent non-maintained special school, although it continues to collaborate with the RNIB to the benefit of visually impaired children and young people. The school was renamed New College Worcester and given a new logo.

In 2007 the college received an outstanding OFSTED report and was awarded specialist special school status, enabling it to continuously improve the support for its students. In 2008 OFSTED concluded that students at New College Worcester receive high quality care and education.

A 2012 Ofsted inspection classed the school with a Grade 2 (Good). The school has also been featured in the Good Schools Guide.

== Curriculum ==
The school offers a wide range of subjects and courses at all academic levels based on the National Curriculum. At Key Stage 3 subjects include mathematics, English, science, history, geography, religious studies, Information Communication Technology (ICT), music, and drama. Courses provided at Advanced Level academic studies (AS and A2 levels) include biology, business studies, chemistry, computing, critical thinking, drama & theatre studies, English literature & language, French, geography, German, government & politics, health & social care, history, law, Latin, mathematics, music, music technology, philosophy, physics, Religious Studies, psychology, sociology, and sport & PE, New College also provides additional subjects including language courses for Japanese and Spanish, and training in cookery and domestic skills. It also offers repeat GCSEs, ASDAN, adult literacy and numeracy, work placements and courses at a local College in Worcester.

Students learn to become independent through mobility lessons with the school's mobility training officers, as well as basic living skills sessions in school (Independent Living Skills; formerly known as 'Design For Living', or 'DFL') and in student accommodation. New College will also teach Braille to students if necessary.

A large staff enables a teacher:student ratio of between 3 and 4 students per teacher. Among the teaching aids in use at the school is a series of MP3 recordings of core textbook material. The MP3s were developed by the schools science department and they are available on the school's Intranet.

== Accommodation ==
Boarding accommodation is provided at the school, in four main houses for the lower school, with a house and hostel for the Sixth Form. The four lower school houses (Brown, Bradnack, Peggy Markes and Dorothy McHugh), the Sixth Form buildings (the Phyllis Monk House and the Phyllis Monk Hostel) and school guest house (Fletcher) are named after former headmasters of New College.

== Affiliations ==
New College has two 'sister schools'. One, in France, is the Royal Institution for Blind Youth in Paris, where Braille inventor Louis Braille was a student, and a school for the blind in Marburg, Germany. Exchanges and trips are arranged between the three. New College also enjoys close relations with Malvern Girls College.

== Media ==
NCW was featured in an episode of Challenge Anneka. In the show, presenter Anneka Rice's team produced the world's first multi-sensory maze for mobility training. The maze involved a series of environments and challenges for blind and partially sighted people. They included a "Pelican crossing", bridges, an observation tower with a spiral staircase, concrete pipe and corrugated iron tunnels, a scaffolding alley, a telephone box and post box, half a car fixed to a wall (giving an impression of a parked car) and a space exploration sculpture created by visually impaired artist Peter Tait. The programme was broadcast in the popular television series during RNIB Week on 18 September 1993.

== Associated people and alumni ==
- Reginald Walter Bonham, British blind chess player, six times world champion
- David Clarke (Paralympic footballer), Paralympian Blind Football
- Rupert Cross, former Vinerian Professor of English Law, University of Oxford
- Gary O'Donoghue, chief North America political correspondent for BBC News
- Edward Elgar, composer, held professorial posts at Worcester in an early period of his career
- Colin Low, Chairman of the RNIB and member of the House of Lords
- John Wall, first visually impaired judge of the High Court of Justice
- Peter White, BBC Radio presenter
- John Foster Wilson, founder of the Royal Commonwealth Society for the Blind
- William Wolstenholme, blind organist and composer, encouraged by Elgar

According to a biography written by Stephen Pollard, David Blunkett failed his assessment to enter the school as a student.

== See also ==
- Exhall Grange School
- Jordanstown Schools
- Royal Blind School
