= Minnie Bodhanwala =

Indian businesswoman

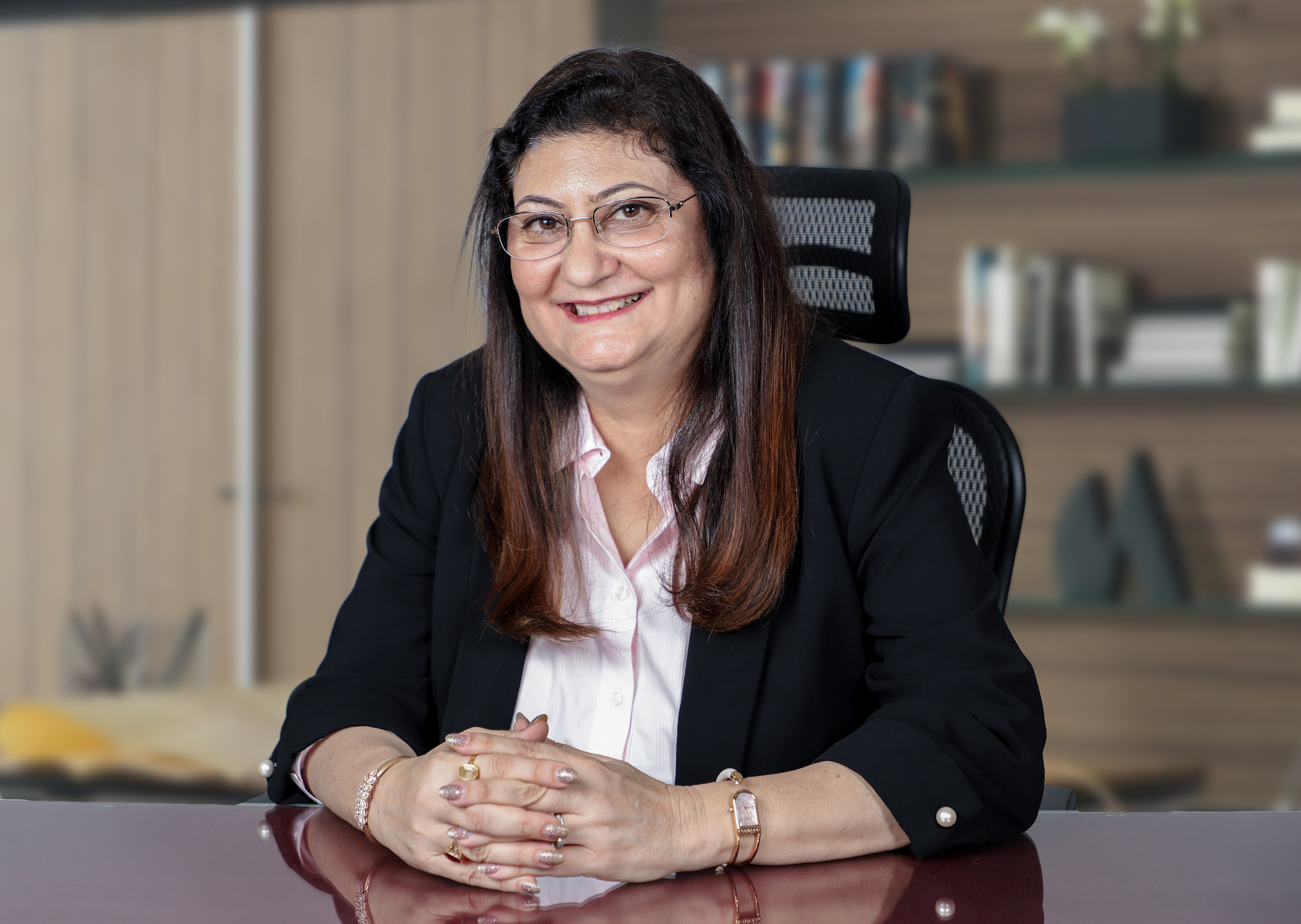
- Born: 13 January 1963 (Bengaluru)
- Occupations: Business executive, Entrepreneur, Healthcare expert
- Notable work: Impact India Foundation, Nowrosjee Wadia Maternity Hospital, Bai Jerbai Wadia Hospital for Children, Little Hearts Marathon

Minnie Bodhanwala is an Indian business executive, entrepreneur and a dentist. She is the CEO of Nowrosjee Wadia Maternity Hospital and Bai Jerbai Wadia Hospital for Children in Mumbai. Bodhanwala is a board member and director of several Wadia Group organizations and companies. Her current appointment includes trustee of Sir Ness Wadia Foundation and advisor to the chairman for CSR and Modern Education society.

== Early life and education ==
Bodhanwala was born on 13 January 1963 in Bengaluru. She completed a Bachelor of Dental Surgery and an MBA. Her degrees include MHA, LLB, TQM, FCR, PGQMAHO, DPE (USA), DBA (USA). She holds a Master Black Belt Expert in Six Sigma. She started her career as a dentist with her own clinical practice in 1986, further she was appointed as Principal Dental Surgeon at Western Railway Hospital, Vadodara.

== Board and positions ==
- Chief Executive Officer at Wadia Hospitals
- Director at Bombay Dyeing & Mfg. Co. Ltd
- Director at National Peroxide Pvt. Ltd.: Director
- Director at Bombay Burmah Trading Co. Ltd
- Wadia Group: CSR Advisor to Chairman
- Advisor at Hospital on Wheels – Impact India Foundation Medical
- Principal Assessor at NABH
- Internal Counselor at Joint Commission International

== Philanthropy ==
Bodhanwala is a member of the Impact India Foundation, where she has set up community projects in dental health for UNDP, UNICEF and WHO for their “Hospital-on-Wheels” project. She launched the Little Hearts Marathon to spread awareness for prevention of cardiac diseases among children. Bodhanwala is known for organising medical camps in the rural areas and education programmes for underprivileged women and children.

She set up a Human Milk Bank in the Bai Jerbai Wadia Hospital for Children hospital and a clinic for children suffering with multiple disabilities and vision impairment in Maharashtra.

== Fellowships and affiliations ==
- Fellowship in Clinical Research Medvarsity from Apollo Hospitals, Hyderabad
- FisQuA - International Society for Quality in Health Care
- Life Member of Academy of Hospital Administration, NOIDA
- Member of Quality Council of India, Delhi

== Achievements ==
- Featured in India Forbes March 2019 as a “Globally Recognized Indian Business Leaders
- Ranked 2nd Position among 25 legends of Healthcare Industry in India by Medicare Insight Magazine
- Appointed as National Healthcare Council President and Voice of Healthcare Women Empowerment and Leadership
