= Farnborough plane crash =

Farnborough plane crash may refer to:

- 1952 Farnborough Airshow crash, in Hampshire, England
- 2008 Biggin Hill Cessna Citation crash, of a jet that crashed into a house in Farnborough, London
