= Colin Low =

Colin Low is the name of:

- Colin Low (filmmaker) (1926–2016), Canadian animation and documentary filmmaker
- Colin Low, Baron Low of Dalston (born 1942), British politician, law scholar and member of the House of Lords
