= Community Health Initiative =

Impact India Foundation's Community Health Initiative (CHI) covers 1.5 million backward tribals in Maharashtra. CHI aims at the reduction of existing disabilities and incidence of future disabilities through prevention and cure using existing delivery systems and available infrastructure, in partnership with Government, NGOs and local community.

CHI has achieved 72% reduction in disability in Thane District, Maharashtra (2005 to 2012), using existing infrastructure and available delivery systems. The CHI is a well-integrated set of preventive health programmes aimed at the holistic improvement of the health of the community, with specific focus on Reproductive, Maternal, Newborn & Child Health + Adolescent (RMNCH +A). The CHI activities are in support of the goals of the National Health Mission and in consonance with the United Nations’ Millennium and Sustainable Development Goals-2015.

Having developed a replicable model in the Parali Primary Health Centre (PHC) area of Palghar District - popn: 60,000 – (2012 to 2016) Maharashtra, which will be evaluated by UNICEF, IIF has commenced in 2015, at the request of the Government, the scaling up of the CHI in all 45 PHC areas of Palghar District (population: 3 million) with Sakharshet Primary Health Centre (PHC) in Jawhar Block covering a 100% Tribal population of about 40,000.

== Components ==
The Community Health Initiative directly addresses the health and nutrition issues of adolescent girls and also creates an enabling environment / ecosystem that engages adolescent boys, the government, and the community. Key components of its programme include:

- Creating awareness in schools for Adolescent Girls & Boys, by conducting Life Skills, Health and Nutrition Education sessions.
- Motivating Adolescent girls to take ownership of their well-being and providing them opportunities and resources for checking and bettering health indicators through the Anaemia Management and Rubella Vaccination programmes.
- Increasing access to nutritious food required for a balanced diet by promoting the cultivation of Household Kitchen Gardens in the community.
- Enhancing capacities of underserved communities through formation of Village Health Committees and Government health workers by fostering trust between the two to boost demand and supply of primary health services through training, monitoring and supervision.
