= Lifeline Express =

Hospital train in India

The Lifeline Express, or Jeevan Rekha Express, is a hospital train in India that has been running since 16 July 1991. It was a collaboration between the Impact India Foundation (IIF), Indian Railways (IR) and the Health Ministry. The train is funded by IIF, international charitable sources, Indian corporations and individuals. The train has made a health impact both in India, as well as around the world where it has inspired similar initiatives. It was the World's First Hospital Train.

== Objective ==
The Lifeline Express was started to provide on-the-spot diagnostic, medical and advanced surgical treatment for preventive and curative interventions for disabled adults and children. It is an outreach program for inaccessible rural areas where medical services are not available, traveling via Indian Railways. Where the rural disabled cannot reach a hospital, the Lifeline Express goes to them. In addition to providing access to these much-needed services, the Lifeline Express seeks to improve the efficiency of the existing local government and voluntary health infrastructure and services, as well as provide initiative and encouragement for the local bodies to get involved in all aspects of the programme and provide follow-up services after the train has left.

== History ==
The Lifeline Express went on its maiden journey on 16 July 1991. Three coaches were donated by IR, and the coaches customised to a hospital train with an operation theatre by Impact India Foundation. Impact India still runs the train with help from IR and corporate and private donors.

After 16 years of work (93 projects in different parts of India) from the Lifeline Express, IR provided the Lifeline Express with five new coaches, for the new and improved Jeevan Rekha Express. There was just one operating theater in the old train; in the new train the operating theatres increased to two. In 2016 two additional coaches were added totalling up to a seven-coach hospital train.

Indian Railways built upon its experience operating the Lifeline Express during the COVID-19 pandemic in India, when it converted sleeper cars into isolation wards for coronavirus patients.

== Services ==
Inauguration of the two additional coaches for Cancer and Family Health Services

The Lifeline Express provides a number of medical services including

- Orthopaedic surgical intervention for correction of handicap and restoration of movement, especially those as a result of polio, congenital deformity like club foot & cerebral palsy.
- Ophthalmological procedures and interventions, e.g. cataract surgery including phaco method and power glasses distribution after establishing the need of partially blind patients.
- Surgical interventions for conductive deformity of middle ear for restoration of hearing & audiometry for restoring hearing of sensory deaf patients.
- Plastic surgical correction of cleft lip and post-burn contractures.
- Epilepsy – Screening and treatment clinic run by an epileptologist along with counselling and education about epilepsy given by epilepsy counsellors
- Dental procedures and oral health hygiene
- Screening & detection of oral, breast & cervical cancer
- Tests for blood pressure to prevent stroke
- Tests for blood sugar to prevent diabetes
- Counselling and referral services.
- Liaison with local health authorities and follow-up.
- Immunisation and other preventive measures.
- Nutritional assessment and services.
- Promotion of health awareness among the deprived in the neglected rural and semi-urban areas
- Providing training to medical and allied-health professionals and other voluntary personnel in surgical procedures, medical and health issues for work in unique field situations.

The train visits different parts of the country, usually aspirational districts in rural areas with insufficient healthcare facilities, or areas hit by natural disasters, etc., and stays in each place for 21 to 25 days while medical care (routine as well as major surgery) is provided to the local people. The train which was started in 1991 is very much in demand.

== Facilities ==
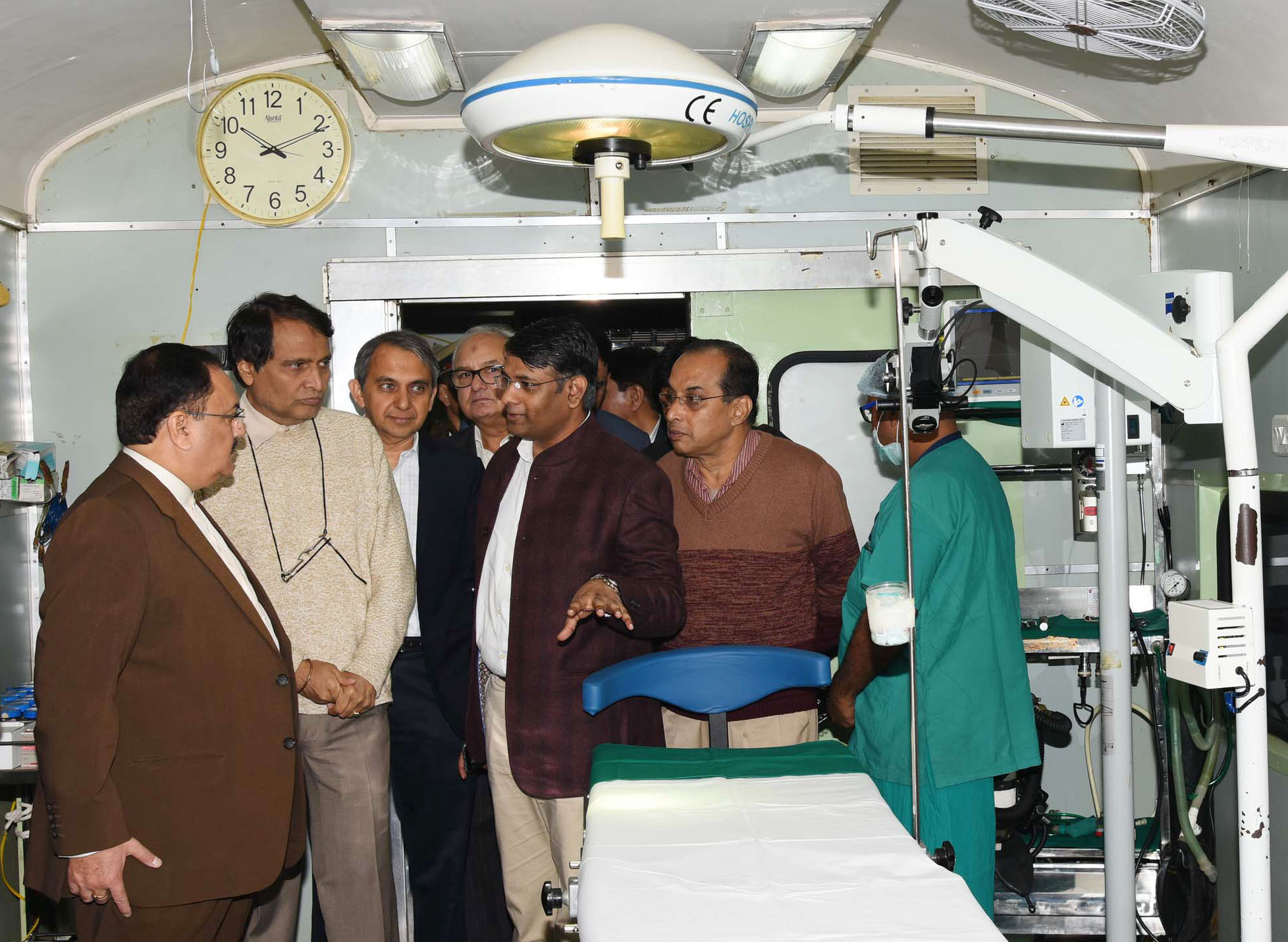
Dignitaries visiting the Lifeline Express, 2016

The Lifeline Express train is formed of specially designed air-conditioned coaches. In 2007 Indian Railways provided five new coaches for the service. The first coach is a power car which also has a staff compartment and pantry area. The staff compartment is situated at the rear with a 12-berth staff-quarter, kitchen unit, water purifier, a gas stove and electric oven and refrigerator. The second coach consists of the medical store, as well as two autoclave units. It also houses a drawing room. The train has a main operating theatre with three operating tables and a second self-contained operating theatre with two tables. In the main theatre, each table has its own set of anesthetic equipment, shadow lights, Boyles apparatus with Halothane vapourisers and imported Carl Zeiss microscope, multi-purpose monitor, defibrillator, diathermy cautery machine, anesthesia ventilator. The theatres are equipped with a closed-circuit television camera which is used in providing training to local doctors in live surgical procedures. An attached six bed recovery room is situated beside the main theatre.

Additionally, the train has an ophthalmologic testing room, a dental unit, a pharmacy, an X-ray unit and an auditorium with a large LCD unit. The train also has a public address system and closed-circuit TV.
