= John Wilson (blind activist) =

British public health advocate

Sir John Foster Wilson CBE (20 January 1919 – 25 November 1999) was a British public health advocate, best known for working to prevent blindness in developing countries in Africa and South and South East Asia.

== Early life and background ==
He was born in Nottinghamshire, the son of the Reverend George Henry Wilson, a Methodist minister. Blinded in a laboratory accident at school at Scarborough High School for Boys in 1931, he went on to be educated at Worcester College for the Blind (now New College Worcester), and obtain a scholarship to study law at St Catherine's College, Oxford. before becoming Assistant Secretary at the Royal National Institute for the Blind in 1941.

== Career ==
He served as a member of the Colonial Office delegation investigating blindness in Africa during 1946–1947.

Wilson was involved in founding several organisations, most notably the Royal Commonwealth Society for the Blind (now known as Sightsavers International) - of which he became the first director in 1950 - but also Disability Awareness in Action, the International Agency for the Prevention of Blindness and IMPACT.

At his instigation, the World Health Organization established the first International Agency for the Prevention of Blindness, of which he served as president from 1974 until his retirement in 1982.

He died in Brighton in 1999.

== Personal life ==
Wilson was married in 1944 to Chloe Jean McDermid ("Jean"). They had two daughters, Jane and Claire.

His widow, Jean, continued the work of Sightsavers International. She was appointed an OBE for her charity work in 1981. She died on 5 January 2026, at the age of 103.

== Legacy ==
The Sir John Wilson School, Dhaka, was established in his honour in Bangladesh, in 1995.

== Published works ==
- Ghana's Handicapped Citizens (1961)
- Travelling Blind (1963)
- World Blindness and Its Prevention (1980)

== Awards and honours ==
- Helen Keller International Award (1970)
- World Humanity Award (1978)
- Royal Society of Medicine's Richard T. Hewitt Award (1991)
- Albert Schweitzer International Prize (1993).
- OBE (1955)
- CBE (1965)
- Knighthood (1975)
- Albert Lasker Public Service Award (1979)
