= William Wolstenholme =

English composer and organist

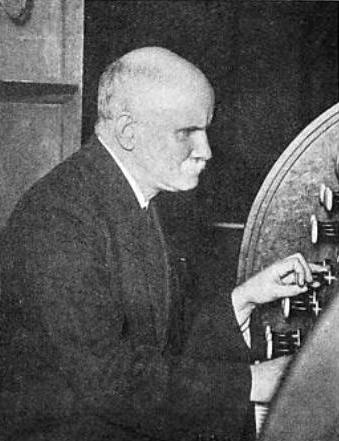
- Born: 24 February 1865; Blackburn, Lancashire, England
- Died: 23 July 1931 (aged 66); Hampstead, London, England
- Burial place: Hampstead Cemetery
- Education: Worcester College for the Blind
- Occupation: Organist

William Wolstenholme (24 February 1865 – 23 July 1931) was an English composer and organist. He was blind from birth.

== Biography ==
William Wolstenholm was born in Blackburn, Lancashire on 24 February 1865. From the age of 9 he attended Worcester College for the Blind, where he first met and was encouraged by Edward Elgar. His primary musical training came from the organist William Done. While in Worcester he played the Mendelssohn G minor piano concerto at a Worcester Philharmonic Society concert. At Oxford from 1877 he was the first blind musician to take the degree since John Stanley. In 1888, Wolstenholme returned to Blackburn as the organist of St Paul's Church (closed in 1954 and demolished). He stayed until 1902 when he became the organist at the Congregationalist Chapel, King's Weigh House in Mayfair, London.

Wolstenholme was a close friend of the other noted blind organist Alfred Hollins and was also well known as a recitalist. His devoted sister Maud acted as his secretary and amanuensis for most of his life, accompanying him on an extensive and very successful tour of the US in 1908. This led to his popularity as a teacher for American students visiting London. In 1921 Wolstenholme played the organ at the funeral of newspaper magnate Sir Cyril Arthur Pearson at St Clement Danes Church. In 1924 he became organist at All Saints' Church, Finchley Road, St John's Wood.

His compositions include around 100 pieces for organ, including the paired pieces from 1895, Die Frage (The Question) and Die Antwort (The Answer), by far his best-known work, and the once highly regarded Organ Sonata in F ("in the style of Handel") published by Lengnick in 1896. There is a cantata, Lord Ullin's Daughter for soloist, chorus and strings, and much church music, including the harvest anthem Thou, O God, Art Praised In Sion. He composed song cycles, solo piano works and pieces for military band. His chamber music includes two string quartets, a piano quartet and a wind quintet. Many of his scores - in braille and in manuscript - are held at the Blackburn's Community History Library.

He died at his home in Hampstead on 23 July 1931, and was buried at Hampstead Cemetery.
