= Sightsavers =

International non-governmental organisation

- Founded: 1950; 76 years ago (as British Empire Society for the Blind)
- Founder: John Wilson (blind activist); Lady Jean Wilson
- Type: INGO
- Location: Haywards Heath, West Sussex, England, UK
- Region served: Worldwide
- Key people: Caroline Harper CBE (CEO); Sir Clive Jones (Chair of Trustees); Chris Whitty (Trustee); Dominic Haslam OBE (Director of Policy and Programme Strategy); Simon Bush (Director Neglected Tropical Diseases)
- Website: www.sightsavers.org

Sightsavers is an international non-governmental organisation that works with partners in developing countries to treat and prevent avoidable blindness, and promote equality for people with visual impairments and other disabilities. It is based in Haywards Heath in the United Kingdom, with branches in Sweden, Norway, India, Italy, Republic of Ireland, the United Arab Emirates, and the US.

The charity was founded in 1950 by Sir John Wilson and was originally called the British Empire Society for the Blind, then the Royal Commonwealth Society for the Blind. Its patron is Princess Alexandra. Between 1950 and 2024, Sightsavers distributed over 1.85 billion treatments to prevent potentially debilitating diseases, supported 9.7 million sight-restoring cataract operations and trained over 381,000 people with disabilities to help them earn a living.

== History ==
=== British Empire Society for the Blind (1950–1957) ===
In 1950 Sir John Wilson, himself blind, set up an international organisation to help people in the world's poorest countries see again. In its first year, the organisation (then known as the British Empire Society for the Blind) formed national organisations for blind people in six countries, initially concentrating on education, rehabilitation and welfare.

In 1953, a number of surveys were conducted in West Africa to determine the extent of the various eye conditions. These proved that 80 per cent of blindness was either preventable or curable. Along with trachoma, onchocerciasis (also known as river blindness, a term coined by Sir John's wife Lady Jean Wilson) was identified as a major cause of blindness in West Africa.

Several pioneer schemes in rural training were set up in 1955 with the aim of integrating blind people into their communities by teaching useful skills such as crop cultivation, fishing, herding and rural crafts. Sir John observed that "In economic terms the cost of blindness is astonishing. Investing in training schemes is crucial in relieving this financial strain and allowing blind people to become independent and self-sufficient." The following year, the first eye clinics were set up in Nigeria.

=== Royal Commonwealth Society for the Blind (1957–1987) ===
The changing political attitude towards Britain's overseas territories resulted in a change of name in 1957 and organisation became known as the Commonwealth Society for the Blind. Royal status (RCSB) was conferred by the Queen a year later.

In 1960, the first mobile eye units appeared in Kenya and Uganda. In 1964, the charity's first eye camp in Asia was held at Spencer Eye Hospital in Karachi, Pakistan. Sir John recognised the potential of these camps to deliver the world's largest sight restoring program.

In the late 1960s, an experiment was launched in Katsina, Nigeria to determine whether blind children could be educated in local schools with the assistance of itinerant teachers. The scheme proved highly successful and was the forerunner of Sightsavers' Inclusive Education Program.

In 1977 the first permanent base hospitals were established in India to provide low-cost mass treatment. By 1980 more emphasis was being put on local training, which was recognised as key to the success of eye health programs. In Malawi a training course for ophthalmic assistants was set up, and this now serves much of central and southern Africa.

In 1984, the world's worst industrial disaster occurred in Bhopal, India, killing up to 8,000 people and temporarily blinding many more. The RCSB was the first relief to arrive and a UK disaster appeal was launched to fund the construction of a new eye hospital to treat the injured.

=== Sightsavers (1987–Present) ===
In 1987, Blue Peter launched the 'Sight Savers' appeal, raising over £2 million for eye care across Africa, and RCSB subsequently adopted the title Sightsavers. The same year, pharmaceutical company Merck released Mectizan®, as trade name for Ivermectin, a drug which killed the blindness-causing stage of the worms that cause onchocerciasis. Sightsavers could now begin a preventative distribution program.

Around 1994, Sightsavers was instrumental in the development of the Comprehensive Eye Services (CES) model, incorporating screening, treatment, surgery, education and training through to rehabilitation services. The model was designed to be replicated in new regions and countries. Sightsavers also set up training courses in new surgical techniques and supported the manufacture of replacement intraocular lenses in India.

In Sightsavers' 50th year in 2000, a cataract campaign restored sight to over 400,000 people. The year also saw the launch of Vision 2020, a joint initiative with the World Health Organization and 19 international eye care organisations, including Sightsavers. Vision 2020 was created with the goal of eliminating avoidable blindness by 2020. Also in 2000, Sightsavers participated in the first World Sight Day, which is now held annually in October.

Sightsavers opened an office in Dun Laoghaire, Dublin, Ireland in 2003, known as Sightsavers Ireland.

In 2012, Sightsavers led a consortium to set up the Global Trachoma Mapping Project, funded by the UK Department for International Development. The project aimed to map the prevalence of trachoma by using mobile phones to collect and transmit data to pinpoint the disease in 29 countries. The project was completed in 2016 and was the largest infectious disease survey ever undertaken.

In 2013, Sightsavers launched its first policy campaign, Put Us in the Picture, calling for global development to be inclusive of people with disabilities. In December 2018, the campaign's main goal was achieved (for the UK government to publish a disability strategy outlining how it would ensure global aid was disability-inclusive). The campaign relaunched as Equal World in 2019, with a broader global call for the United Nations and its member states to uphold disability rights. In the latter half of 2019 a petition for the campaign gained 50,000 signatures worldwide and was handed in to the UN Under-Secretary-General in December 2019. In 2021, the Put Us in the Picture website, hosted by Sightsavers Ireland, won the award for Not-for-profit website of the year at Ireland's annual National Digital Awards.

Sightsavers, with funding from the World Bank, launched the School Health Integrated Programming (SHIP) project in 2016. Initially intended as a pilot, the project worked with governments in Cambodia, Ethiopia, Ghana and Senegal to improve awareness and health for both vision and nutrition in schools. The pilot proved successful enough for the project to be rolled out in Liberia in 2018 and Pakistan in 2019.

In December 2017, Sightsavers celebrated its one billionth treatment for neglected tropical diseases (NTDs).

In 2018, Sightsavers launched their Accelerate Trachoma Elimination program, which aims to support the elimination of trachoma as a public health risk in at least 15 countries while speeding up the progress of elimination in two other countries by 2027. As of November 2025, the program has proven to play a key role in the elimination of trachoma in eight countries: Ghana, The Gambia, Malawi, Benin, Mali, Pakistan, Senegal and Egypt.

September 2025 saw Sightsavers join Bloomberg Philanthropies' Vision Initiative to boost eye health services and help address the global vision crisis by improving access to eye care in Kenya and Nigeria. The program, which has funding of $75 million, aims to carry out millions of eye tests, provide access to glasses and build sustainable healthcare systems while supporting long-term government investment.

== Reviews and accolades ==
Charity evaluator GiveWell included Sightsavers in its list of top charities for 2016, for the organisation's work on deworming programs, and published a review of the Sightsavers' work on that front. GiveWell also expects Good Ventures, a foundation it works closely with, to grant Sightsavers $3 million out of Good Ventures' budget of $50 million to give to GiveWell top charities.

November 2019 saw Sightsavers CEO, Dr. Caroline Harper, become the first ever recipient of the Hemingway Award.

In December 2019, the Sightsavers team in Nigeria was recognised for their work in fighting against river blindness, following surveys that revealed no new cases in humans or evidence of the disease-carrying parasite in flies. The Nigerian ministry of health presented the award to the Sightsavers team at a meeting in Abuja.

London's OXO gallery hosted Sightsavers' BLINK exhibition in October 2019. The exhibition, created in collaboration with MET Studio, Barker Langham and Jason Bruges, won multiple design awards throughout 2020, including the Experiential Design award at the Drum Design Awards (where the exhibit was also commended in the Design for Good category), the Design Communication and Best of Best awards at the Red Dot Awards and the Most Innovative Event award at the Charity Event Awards.

In 2021, the Sightsavers Ireland website, Put Us in the Picture, won the award for Not-for-profit website of the year at Ireland's annual National Digital Awards.

During 2022, the Sightsavers IT Bridge Academy project in Kenya was voted winner of the Africa Skills Portal for Youth and Employment award.

A short film produced by Sightsavers, entitled Noor, won the January 2023 award for Best Health Film at the Cannes World Film Festival.

In 2023, Sightsavers received the Zero Project Award. Sightsavers designed a method in 2017 based on professionally researched guidelines that has led to a massive increase in civic engagement of persons with disabilities in Senegal and Cameroon. In cooperation with two national federations of OPDs, the accessibility of electoral processes and to empower persons with disabilities to actively participate in local governance has been improved. By 2022, 128 men and women with disabilities in both countries were formally elected as local councillors or designated as representatives in local decision-making committees.

February 2025 saw the Sightsavers IT Bridge Academy project win further recognition when technology company Cisco named it as the world's best Cisco academy African Networking Academy Conference.

In October 2025, Sightsavers' technical lead Abdulai Dumbuya was recognised at the Presidential National Best Teacher Awards in Sierra Leone for his work in the Sierra Leone Secondary Education Improvement Programme II, which aims to make education systems more inclusive for people with disabilities.

== See also ==
- International Resources for the Improvement of Sight
- Iris Fund for Prevention of Blindness
- Orbis International
- Seeing is Believing (organization)
