= VirtualGym TV =

Live broadcasting and on-demand online gym

- Industry: Fitness
- Founded: January 2008
- Founder: Richard Davis & Carl Rigby
- Headquarters: Rochester, Kent
- Area served: Worldwide

VirtualGym TV was a live broadcasting and on-demand online gym, which provided virtual exercise classes.

The company was created to help address the global obesity crisis, which faces the UK, and the wider general population. Typically, intimidation, cost, and flexibility are the biggest contributors keeping people from working out in a public setting. VirtualGymTV was designed to combat this barrier by delivering on-demand access to exercise.

The company's audience was in excess of 130,000 retail and corporate users.

== History ==
The idea was founded when the then Managing Director, Richard Davis, was having a conversation with a high level instructor colleague, where at the time, the only real options were to either create a Fitness DVD and distribute it in the normal way, or to broadcast on the television. Coming from a background in Employee Benefits, Davis developed what is primarily a corporate benefit for large scale, fragmented workforces, but was accessible by the wider general public as well.

The company continued to grow and by the summer of 2008, it formed a strategic alliance with the major sportswear manufacturer, Asics. More recently, they had achieved approval from the Department of Health were a delivery partner of the Change4Life and MoreActive4Life social obesity campaigns (NHS) before they closed down. They also worked in partnership with their alcohol limits campaign, and the business awareness campaign with the FIA (Fitness Industry Association).

== Features ==
The core of the product was powered by the 'Virtual Personal Trainer' (VPT) software. The software captured a broad range of physiological and psychological data, which was analyzed by the VPT software, and then recommended exercises for the individual. The VPT would specifically recommend which sessions the customer should participate in, the frequency with which they should participate, and the intensity level that was right for them. The user would then participate in regular exercise from their ever-changing library of exercise content across all exercise areas. This ranged from Aerobics through to Pilates, Stability Ball, and specific pre- and post-natal content.

== Classes ==
Each week approximately 40 new classes were uploaded to the site. The classes and tuition classes were delivered through the internet to both retail and corporate clients, via their website. Typical classes included aerobics, step aerobics, boxercise, kick boxing, yoga, Pilates, tai chi, body conditioning, circuit training, body sculpting, medicine ball, dance, stationary (spin) bicycle, treadmill, interval training, and various martial arts training sessions, (including meditation / relaxation).

Classes were scheduled in a similar fashion to a traditional gym, with shorter energizing sessions in the morning and longer sessions in the afternoon and evening, which lasted between 45 and 60 minutes. Sessions were broadcast across a range of ability standards so that customers could choose their appropriate complexity and fitness demand.

== Instructors ==
Instructors were accredited with the Register of Exercise Professions (REPS), the governing body for the health and fitness industry, and the National Register of Personal Trainers. They were qualified to a minimum level by the relevant professional organization. Instructors included Pierre Pozzuto, personal trainer of Gordon Ramsay, Christian Slater and Keira Knightley. Other well known instructors included Dan Little, Jackie Diss and Chris Roberts.
