= Dave Pearson (painter) =

British artist (1937-2008)

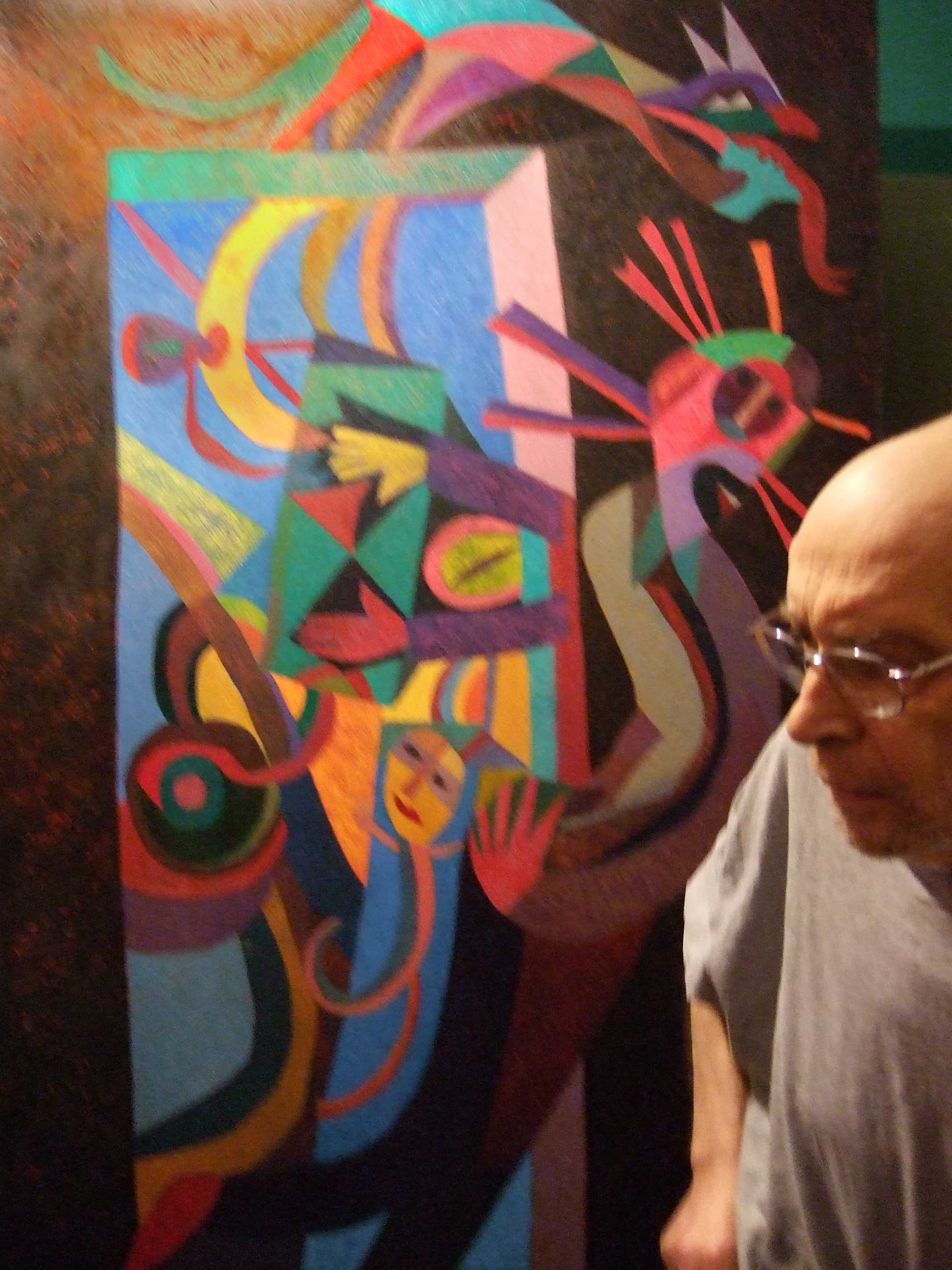
Dave Pearson, June 2008

David Samuel Pearson (4 August 1937 – 19 July 2008), commonly known as "Dave Pearson", was an English painter and educator who was "a great example of an artist whose life was completely dedicated to serving the imagination". Highly prolific, throughout his life he produced a prodigious quantity of work.

== Life ==
Dave Pearson was born in Clapton, London in 1937. His father, Sam, was a tailor and his mother Ann went on, in later life, to become a prolific self-taught artist. Pearson was evacuated to Leicester at the age of 7, and later attended Parmiter's Grammar School in Bethnal Green.

He went on to study painting at both Saint Martin's School of Art and the Royal Academy Schools. In 1963 he began teaching at Preston School of Art but soon moved to Manchester School of Art where he remained until his retirement in 2002. He lived and kept a studio in Haslingden, Rossendale, as well as at Globe Arts, also in Rossendale. Although he exhibited, notably at the Bluecoat Gallery, Liverpool; the Serpentine Gallery, London; the Ikon Gallery, Birmingham; and Chester Arts Centre, he worked obsessively, apparently oblivious to the wider art world.

== Work ==
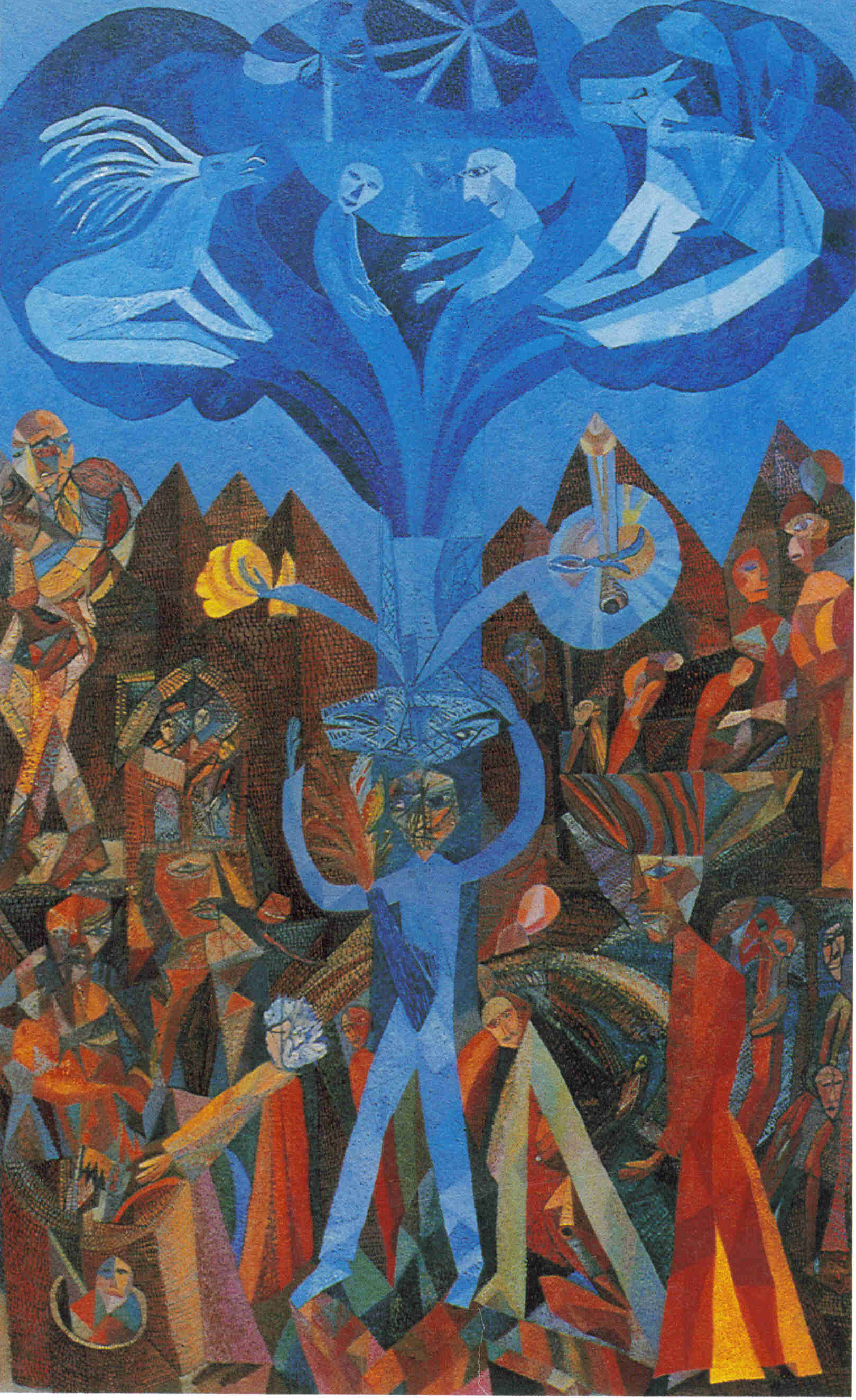
A painting from the series 'Byzantium'. Dave Pearson 1992

In 1959 Dave Pearson exhibited as part of the Young Contemporaries exhibition in London, and followed this with an exhibition Astronauts at the New Arts Centre.

Shortly after his move to Manchester his work was based on the work of Van Gogh, having been inspired by seeing Lust for Life. He filled his house and studio with larger-than-life installations, including The Potato Eaters and The (Van Gogh) Bedroom. He then produced a series of nearly 400 drawings and paintings based on the Book of Revelation. By the 1980s he was working on another large series of drawings, drypoints and paintings based on English Calendar Customs and, later, a series based on the Abbots Bromley Horn Dance – In the Seven Woods.

Inspired by the Yeats poem Sailing to Byzantium, throughout the 1990s Dave produced an enormous body of work and staged a series of ambitious one person shows in the north of England with paintings specially created to fit the dimensions of each space. At the Bede Gallery, Jarrow, where the space was not quite big enough, he covered the floor with mirrors so he could use every inch of the ceiling. Byzantium and Jerusalem Part One, in which he filled the Holden Gallery in Manchester quite literally floor to ceiling, followed in 1997, described as "reminiscent more of an ancient mediterranean orthodox monastery than what one expects to encounter in an art gallery".

As well as literary sources, other themes for his work have included Palmers Yard and the Jarrow March, war memorials, mediaeval bestiaries, ancient sites in Orkney and latterly his own illness and mortality. Throughout his life he continued to exhibit in the UK and Europe.

During his life he produced well over 13,000 pieces of work. Adrian Henri, in Environments and Happenings noted his obsessional quality, and went on to describe Dave (in 1974) as "one of the most exciting new artists around".

The estate was inherited by Dave Pearson's son Christopher, who made over the artwork to a trust, the Dave Pearson Trust. The estate was returned to Christopher Pearson in 2018.

== Teaching ==
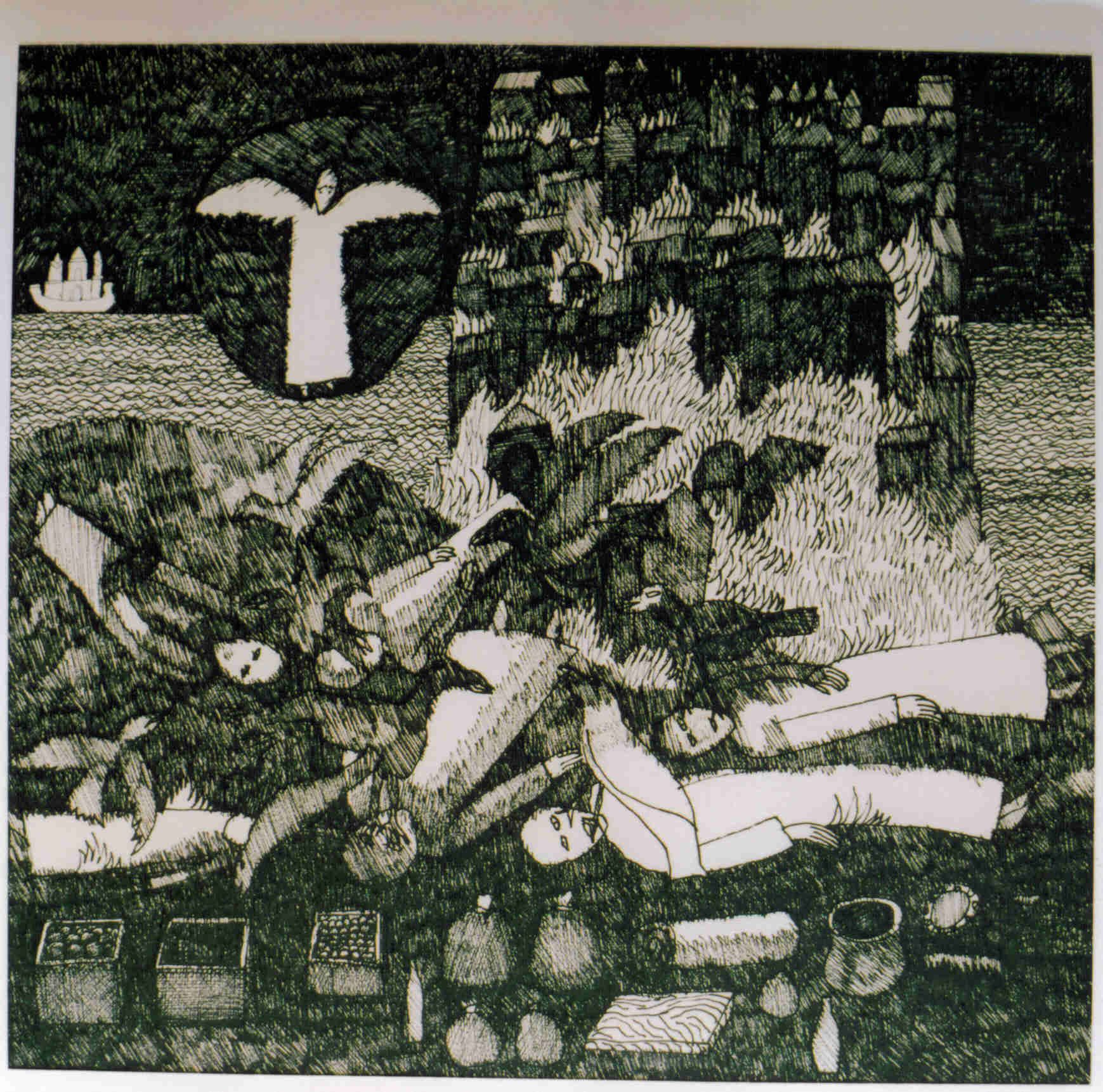
Drawing number 7 from the 4th Book of Revelation by Dave Pearson

For much of his working life Pearson was a lecturer, and later Senior Lecturer, in the Department of Fine Arts at Manchester Metropolitan University, 1964–2002. As an artist he was unusually productive and passionate, and he encouraged and nurtured these qualities in his students throughout his long teaching career. As the painter Stuart Bradshaw commented "Dave the teacher was much less of a teacher than Dave the artist." If Pearson was a great exemplar of what an artist is, he was also no respecter of budgets, bureaucracy or limitations of any kind and was renowned for his ability to use a whole year's worth of course materials in a week-long project.

== Posthumous developments ==
The Dave Pearson Trust rescued Pearson's studio in Haslingden, which was left on his death in a dilapidated and semi-ruined condition. The Trust has subsequently catalogued the enormous body of work, holding occasional exhibitions both at the restored studio and galleries, which has helped develop a wider interest in the artist. In September 2011 a film, To Byzantium, directed by the film-maker Derek Smith, was released that shows a group of friends rescuing the artist's work and describing the development of his work. In November 2010 the film was shown in the UK on the Community Channel, and submitted to the New York City Film Festivals World's Best Television and film, and the Sheffield Documentary Festival.

As a result of this, and the involvement of the critic, writer and poet, Edward Lucie-Smith, there was a large exhibition of Pearson's work at the Bermondsey Project gallery in London, in April/May 2012. Several other exhibitions have followed from this, and another large-scale exhibition at the Turnpike Gallery, Leigh, in Summer 2018 that showed work originally hung in the same space in 1994.

In 2009 the Trust completed its cataloguing of the artist's work and started operating as The Dave Pearson Studio.

== Public Collections ==
- Victoria Gallery & Museum, Liverpool (3 works)
- Royal Blackburn Hospital
- The Museum of English Rural Life (6 works)
- The Whitaker, Rawtenstall

== Other sources ==
- Official website
- An Artist's Estate; a blog on managing Pearson's artwork
- Web gallery
