= Colin Low, Baron Low of Dalston =

British politician and law scholar

The Right Honourable The Lord Low of Dalston CBE
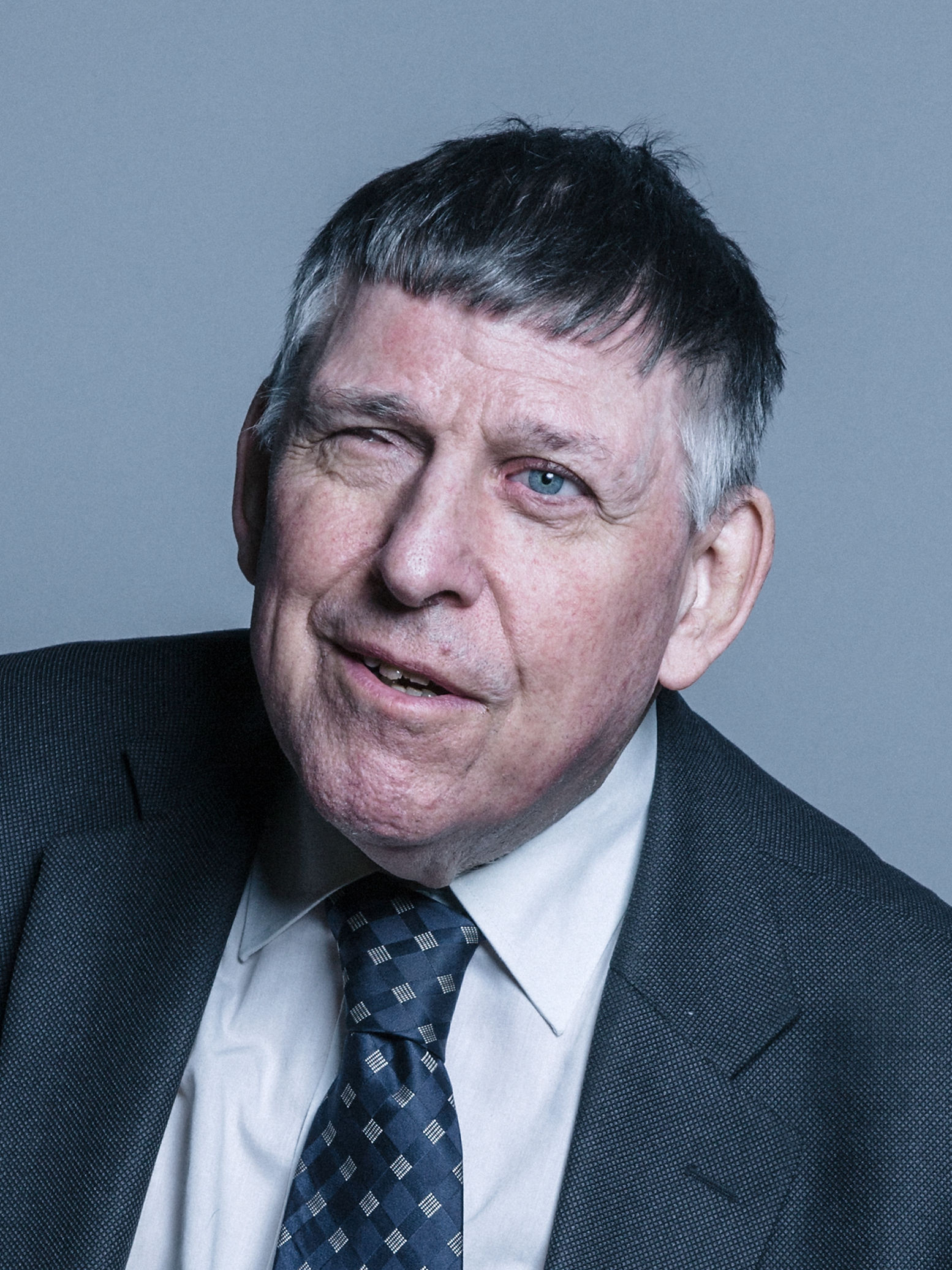
- Official portrait, 2018

Member of the House of Lords
- Lord Temporal
- Life peerage 13 June 2006 – 15 May 2026

Personal details
- Born: Colin Mackenzie Low; 23 September 1942 (age 84) Edinburgh, Scotland
- Party: None (crossbencher)
- Education: Worcester College for the Blind; The Queen's College, Oxford; University of Cambridge
- Low's voice recorded 2012, as part of an audio description of SUBJECT for VocalEyes

Colin Mackenzie Low, Baron Low of Dalston, CBE (born 23 September 1942) is a British politician, law scholar and former member of the House of Lords.

== Early life ==
Low was born in Edinburgh and has been blind since the age of three. He was educated at what is now New College Worcester, at The Queen's College, Oxford (BA) and at Cambridge University (Diploma in Criminology).

== Career ==
Low was a Lecturer in the Faculty of Law at the University of Leeds from 1968 until 1984 and later held a research post at City University London until 2000.

He is a vice-president of the RNIB and former chairman. He was also President of the European Blind Union (EBU) for 8 years from 2003. He is a board member of the Snowdon Trust, founded by the Antony Armstrong-Jones, 1st Earl of Snowdon, which provides grants and scholarships for students with disabilities.

Low is the Immediate Past President of the International Council for Education of People with Visual Impairment.

== Honours ==
Low was appointed a Commander of the Order of the British Empire (CBE) in the 2000 New Year Honours for services to the RNIB and disabled peoples' rights. On 13 June 2006, he was created a life peer as Baron Low of Dalston, of Dalston in the London Borough of Hackney and he sits as a crossbencher.

In 2014 he was awarded the Liberty Human Rights 'Campaign of the Year Award'. The citation reads: "for leading the campaign to ensure the protection of the Human Rights Act would apply to all residential care provided or arranged by local authorities. His victory forced the Government to accept the importance of guaranteeing human rights protections by demonstrating just how relevant those rights are for all." The award was presented to Lord Low at the annual Human Rights Awards ceremony at Queen Elizabeth Hall, London, on 1 December 2014.

Orders of precedence in the United Kingdom
Preceded by The Lord Browne of Belmont	Gentlemen; Baron Low of Dalston	Followed by The Lord Boyd of Duncansby
