= Replica (magazine) =

Online magazine published by Global Tat Productions

- Chief Custodian: Thomas Foxley
- Categories: Collective Journalism
- Frequency: Bi-Monthly
- Publisher: Global Tat Productions
- Founded: 2008
- Country: United Kingdom
- Language: English
- Website: www.replicamag.co.uk

Replica is an online magazine published by Global Tat Productions. The magazine claims to be the pioneer of collective journalism, a form of reported media whereby all material within the publication is contributed by the public.

== History and profile ==
Replica was founded in early 2008 by Thomas Foxley and Rosie Allen-Jones and is considered a British cult.

== See also ==
Collaborative writing
