= John Wall (judge) =

British judge

Sir John Anthony Wall CBE

Personal details
- Born: 4 June 1930 London, United Kingdom
- Died: 1 December 2008 (aged 78)
- Children: four sons
- Education: Balliol College, Oxford

Sir John Anthony Wall CBE (4 June 1930 – 1 December 2008) was a British lawyer and Deputy Master of the High Court and the first visually impaired judge at the High Court of Justice of the 20th century.

== Biography ==
Wall was born in East Finchley. He had had glaucoma from an early age, which caused him to go completely blind by the age of eight. After his blindness took hold, he moved from a mainstream school to Chorleywood School for the Blind. He moved to Worcester College for the Blind (now New College Worcester) in 1940. Despite only being 14, two years younger than usual, he took his School Certificate in 1944, achieving the highest score in his class. After further strong academic performance in his Higher School Certificate, he was accepted into Balliol College, Oxford where he read jurisprudence and graduated in 1951. He also played chess at school and university.

His blindness presented him with difficulties in finding a job; he made over 400 job applications after graduating and was invited to 53 interviews before he was offered a job as an articled clerk at Wilkins, Rowan and Newman, a small law firm of solicitors in Chelsea. He qualified as a solicitor in 1954, and in 1956 he began working as a legal adviser for the National Association of Local Government Officers (now part of Unison). Around this time he attempted to become a judge, but his application was rejected due to the potential difficulties his blindness could cause (as he would be unable to read court documents or study witnesses, for example) and because it was felt appointing a blind judge would not leave the public confident he could perform his duties.

After 18 years as a legal adviser with NALGO, he joined the law firm Middleton Lewis in 1974 as a partner specialising in litigation, staying on when the firm merged with Lawrence Graham in 1977. He again applied to become a judge in 1990 and was this time successful. He was formally appointed as a Deputy Master of the High Court in the Chancery Division in 1991. He is believed to be the first blind person to be appointed to judicial office in modern times, and possibly the first since the 18th century. A clerk helped him to deal with his paperwork, reading the case materials to him before court hearings and reading barristers' written submissions. He was noted for his speed, work ethic and efficiency. In 1993 he retired as a partner at Lawrence Graham, and retired from his position as a Deputy Master in 2002.

He was chairman of the Society of Blind Lawyers, and served on the committees of the Royal National Institute for the Blind and the European Blind Union. He was president of the EBU from 1996 to 2003. After serving on the executive council of the RNIB since 1962, he its chairman from 1990 to 2000. In the 1994 Queen's Birthday Honours, he was appointed a Commander of the Order of the British Empire, "For services to Blind People", and was knighted in the 2000 Queen's Birthday Honours, "For services to Disabled People".

He married twice, and had four sons from his first marriage. He died on 1 December 2008 of heart failure. He was survived by his sons; both of his wives predeceased him.
