= IMPACT (British organisation) =

International initiative

IMPACT is an international initiative which focusses on preventive and social health and promote awareness and intervention to prevent avoidable disability. Founded in 1980s by Sir John Wilson, IMPACT was formed as a part of the UN's Decade of disabled people. The UK IMPACT Foundation (UKIF), which is the central organisation to its sister projects over the world, was formally registered as a charity in 1985. The organisation's international programme was formally set up by the United Nations General Assembly supported by the British government. Although it does not receive any financial assistances from these organisations, it is jointly promoted by the World Health Organization, UNICEF and the UNDP. IMPACT currently has projects focussing on disability prevention, social health, nutritional health, child health as well as disaster relief in some of the least developed nations in Asia and Africa, including countries like Bangladesh, Cambodia, India, Nepal, East Africa. The India wing of IMPACT also leads Community Health Initiatives in Rural Areas and is actively involved in initiatives to prevent infant mortality.

== Impact India Foundation (IIF) ==
Impact India Foundation (IIF), an International Initiative Against Avoidable Disablement established through a United Nations' General Assembly Resolution, was launched by the Government of India on 2 October 1983. Its aim is to act in partnership with the Government as a catalyst bringing together the corporate sector, non-profit organisations, professionals and the community in mass health projects of National priority, using existing delivery systems and available infrastructure. Today, Impact is active in twelve countries under the banner of the International Federation of Impact Organisations (IFIO). Impact India Foundation was founded by A H Tobaccowala, YH Malegam & Zelma Lazarus in 1983 as part of National Plan of Action Against Avoidable Disablement with the active support of United Nations Development Programme, World Health Organization and United Nations Children's Fund (UNICEF). Its aim is to provide curative services to people suffering from various kinds of disabilities, mainly disorders of the eye, ear, nose, throat and limbs. Notable projects implemented by Impact India include the Lifeline Express and Community Health Initiative (CHI) in India.
