= 2008 Biggin Hill Cessna Citation crash =

Private plane crash in England

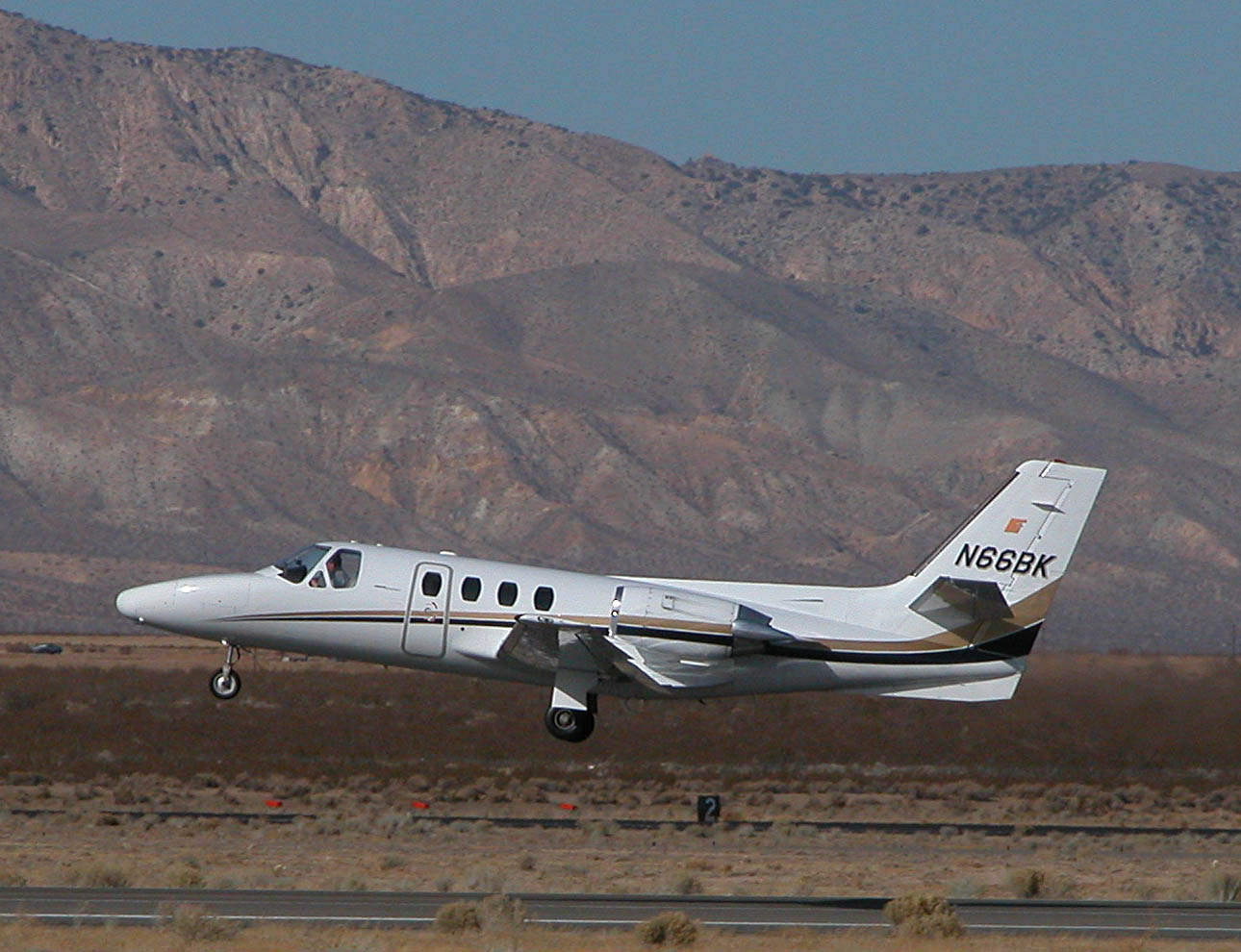
- A Cessna 500 Citation, similar to VP-BGE, a model 501

Accident
- Date: 30 March 2008
- Summary: Engine failure, pilot error
- Site: Farnborough, London, United Kingdom; NGR TQ 438 649 51.3646°N 0.0671665°E

Aircraft
- Aircraft type: Cessna 501 Citation
- Operator: Ross Air
- Registration: VP-BGE
- Flight origin: Biggin Hill, United Kingdom
- Destination: Pau, France
- Occupants: 5
- Passengers: 3
- Crew: 2
- Fatalities: 5
- Survivors: 0

On 30 March 2008, a Cessna 501 Citation crashed into a house in Farnborough, London (UK), near Biggin Hill Airport, from where the aircraft had taken off a short time before. There were no survivors among the five people on board, which included former racing drivers Richard Lloyd and David Leslie.

== Aircraft ==
The aircraft involved was a Bermudan-registered Cessna 501 Citation, tail number VP-BGE, construction number 500-0287, built in 1975. At the time of the accident, the aircraft had completed 5,844 hours total time and 5,352 cycles.

== Accident flight ==
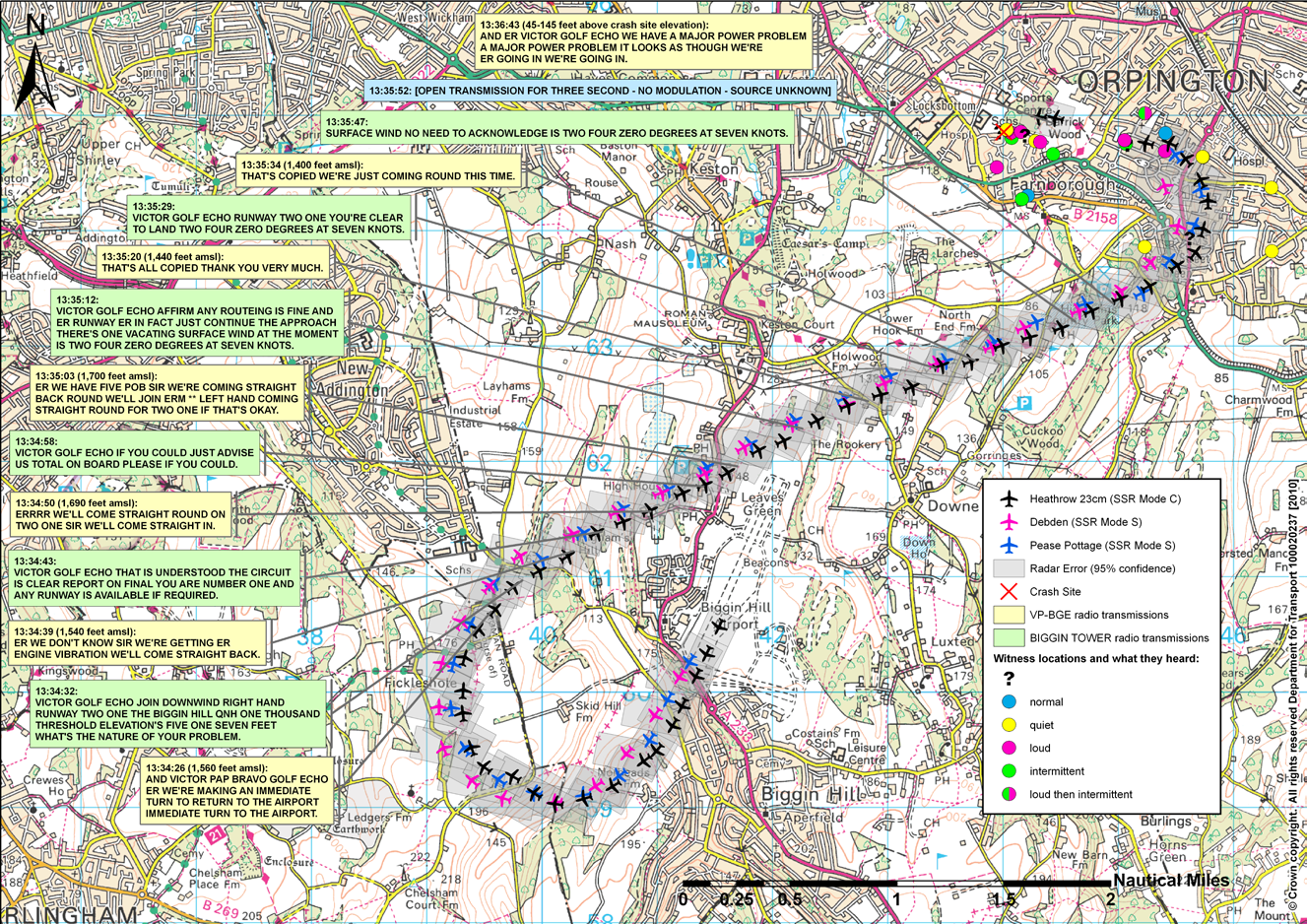
Flight path, witness locations, and radio communications with Citation VP-BGE on the accident flight

The Citation took off at 14:32 local time from runway 21 at Biggin Hill airport, with destination Pau Pyrénées Airport in France. Less than two minutes into the flight, the pilot radioed an emergency call, reporting "engine vibrations" and requesting an immediate return to Biggin Hill. The aircraft was given permission to land on any runway, and the pilots indicated that they would attempt to return to the departure runway. Shortly after the radio call the aircraft rapidly lost altitude and at 14:37 crashed into a property in Romsey Close, Farnborough. There were no survivors from the wreckage, which was consumed by fire, as was the house that the aircraft struck. A neighbouring property was also damaged by fire.

== Casualties ==
All five occupants of the aircraft (two crew and three passengers) died in the accident. There were no physical injuries among residents of the street into which the plane crashed, although two people were later treated for shock.

Crew

- Mike Roberts, 63
- Michael Chapman, 57 Chief Flying Instructor and co-founder of the Real Flying Company, Shoreham, Sussex

Passengers

- David Leslie, 54, former British Touring Car Championship driver and Eurosport commentator. Leslie left a wife and two sons.
- Richard Lloyd, 63, former British Touring Car Championship and World Sportscar Championship driver and team owner of Apex Motorsport. Lloyd left a wife and three daughters.
- Christopher Allarton, 25, Data Analyst and Apex Motorsport employee.

A memorial service was held for the victims on 6 April 2008.

== Investigation ==
An Investigation was conducted by the Air Accident Investigation Branch (AAIB), assisted by the National Transportation Safety Board, the Federal Aviation Administration and by the aircraft manufacturer, Cessna and the engine manufacturer, Pratt & Whitney Canada. The preliminary report from the AAIB revealed that there was no debris found on the runway at Biggin Hill, and no evidence of a bird strike or foreign object damage to either engine.

The AAIB published its formal report into the accident on 21 May 2010. It concluded that:

- the "engine vibration" reported by the pilots most likely came not from an engine itself, but from the faulty air cycle machine;
- a missing rivet head on the left fuel cut-off lever could have resulted in the pilots shutting down that engine inadvertently;
- both engines had been shut down, either intentionally or not, during the course of the short flight. The crew had subsequently tried to restart both engines, but had attempted to relight the second engine before the first one had reached sufficient speed, causing the relight of both engines to fail.

An inquest into the death of the five victims opened on 31 May 2011 in Bromley, London. The inquest concluded on 1 June with verdicts of accidental death being returned in all five cases.

== See also ==
- List of accidents involving sports teams
