= Municipal Corporations Act =

Stock short title used for UK legislation

Municipal Corporations Act (with its variations) is a stock short title used in the United Kingdom for legislation relating to municipal corporations.

== List ==
- The Municipal Corporations Act 1835 (5 & 6 Will. 4. c. 76)
- The Municipal Corporation (Boundaries) Act 1836 (6 & 7 Will. 4. c. 103)
- The Municipal Corporation (Borough Fund) Act 1836 (6 & 7 Will. 4. c. 104)
- The Municipal Corporation (Justices, &c.) Act 1836 (6 & 7 Will. 4. c. 105)
- The Municipal Corporation (General) Act 1837 (7 Will. 4 & 1 Vict. c. 78)
- The Municipal Corporation (Watch Rate) Act 1837 (7 Will. 4 & 1 Vict. c. 81)
- The Municipal Corporation (Benefices) Act 1838 (1 & 2 Vict. c. 31)
- The Municipal Corporation (Borough Courts) Act 1839 (2 & 3 Vict. c. 27)
- The Municipal Corporation (Watch Rate) Act 1839 (2 & 3 Vict. c. 28)
- The Municipal Corporation (Watch Rate) Act 1840 (3 & 4 Vict. c. 28)
- The Municipal Corporation Act 1843 (6 & 7 Vict. c. 89)
- The Municipal Corporation (Rates) Act 1845 (8 & 9 Vict. c. 110)
- The Municipal Corporation (Incorporation) Act 1850 (13 & 14 Vict. c. 42)
- The Municipal Corporation (Bridges) Act 1850 (13 & 14 Vict. c. 64)
- The Municipal Corporation (Justices) Act 1850 (13 & 14 Vict. c. 91)
- The Municipal Corporation Act 1853 (16 & 17 Vict. c. 79)
- The Municipal Corporation Act 1857 (20 & 21 Vict. c. 50)
- The Municipal Corporations Acts Amendment Act 1861 (24 & 25 Vict. c. 75)
- The Municipal Corporation (Recorders) Act 1869 (32 & 33 Vict. c. 23)
- The Municipal Corporation (Elections) Act 1869 (32 & 33 Vict. c. 55)
- The Municipal Corporations Act 1859 Amendment Act (34 & 35 Vict. c. 67)
- The Municipal Corporations Evidence Act 1873 (36 & 37 Vict. c. 33)
- The Municipal Corporations (New Charters) Act 1877 (40 & 41 Vict.]] c. 69)
- The Municipal Corporations Act 1882 (45 & 46 Vict. c. 50)
- The Municipal Corporations Act 1883 (46 & 47 Vict. c. 18)

The Municipal Corporations (Ireland) Acts 1840 to 1888 was the collective title of the following Acts:

- The Municipal Corporations (Ireland) Act 1840 (3 & 4 Vict. c. 108)
- The Municipal Corporations (Ireland) Act 1842 (5 & 6 Vict. c. 104)
- The Municipal Corporations (Ireland) Act 1843 (6 & 7 Vict. c. 93)
- The Municipal Corporations Act 1852 (15 & 16 Vict. c. 5)
- The Municipal Corporations Act 1859 (22 Vict. c. 35)
- The Municipal Corporation Mortgages, &c. Act 1860 (23 & 24 Vict. c. 16)
- The Borough Coroners (Ireland) Act 1860 (23 & 24 Vict. c. 74)
- The Borough Clerks of the Peace (Ireland) Act 1868 (31 & 32 Vict. c. 98)
- The Municipal Elections Act 1875 (38 & 39 Vict. c. 40)
- The Municipal Privilege (Ireland) Act 1876 (39 & 40 Vict. c. 76)
- The Municipal Elections (Ireland) Act 1879 (42 & 43 Vict. c. 53)
- The Municipal Voters Relief Act 1885 (48 & 49 Vict. c. 9)
- The Municipal Local Bills (Ireland) Act 1888 (51 & 52 Vict. c. 34)
- The Borough Funds (Ireland) Act 1888 (51 & 52 Vict. c. 53)

== See also ==
- List of short titles
- Municipal Corporations Act (India)
