= Counties of cities =

Counties of cities are areas combining functions of county and city:

- in England & Wales and Ireland
  - county corporate (prior to the creation of county councils in 1889 (England & Wales) 1898)
  - county borough (subsequently)
- in Scotland
  - from the Local Government (Scotland) Act 1889 until 1973
  - List of local government areas in Scotland 1930–75#Counties of cities

== See also ==
- county town
- City-county (disambiguation)
- City status in the United Kingdom
- Counties of the United Kingdom
