= History of Warwickshire =

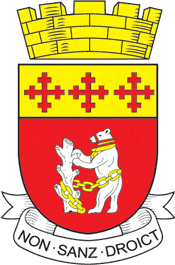
Coat of Arms of Warwickshire

This is about the history of the County of Warwick situated in the English Midlands. Historically, bounded to the north-west by Staffordshire, by Leicestershire to the north-east, Northamptonshire to the east, Worcestershire to the west, Oxfordshire to the south, Gloucestershire to the south-west, an exclave of Derbyshire to the far north, and less than 400 yards from the border with Shropshire in the far west.

Areas historically part of Warwickshire include Coventry, Solihull, Sutton Coldfield, much of central Birmingham (including the city centre, Aston, Edgbaston and Erdington), Meriden, Knowle, Dorridge, Balsall Common, Berkswell and Hampton-in-Arden, which all became part of the metropolitan county of West Midlands (Sutton Coldfield becoming part of Birmingham) following local government re-organisation in 1974 after the passage of the Local Government Act 1972. The county also included the eastern half of Tamworth (including the castle) and its suburbs, and the parish of Ipsley which nowadays comprises roughly half of suburban Redditch, which were ceded to Staffordshire in 1888 and Worcestershire in 1931, respectively, as well as the Tutnall and Cobley exclave, which was ceded to Worcestershire as part of the Counties (Detached Parts) Act 1844.

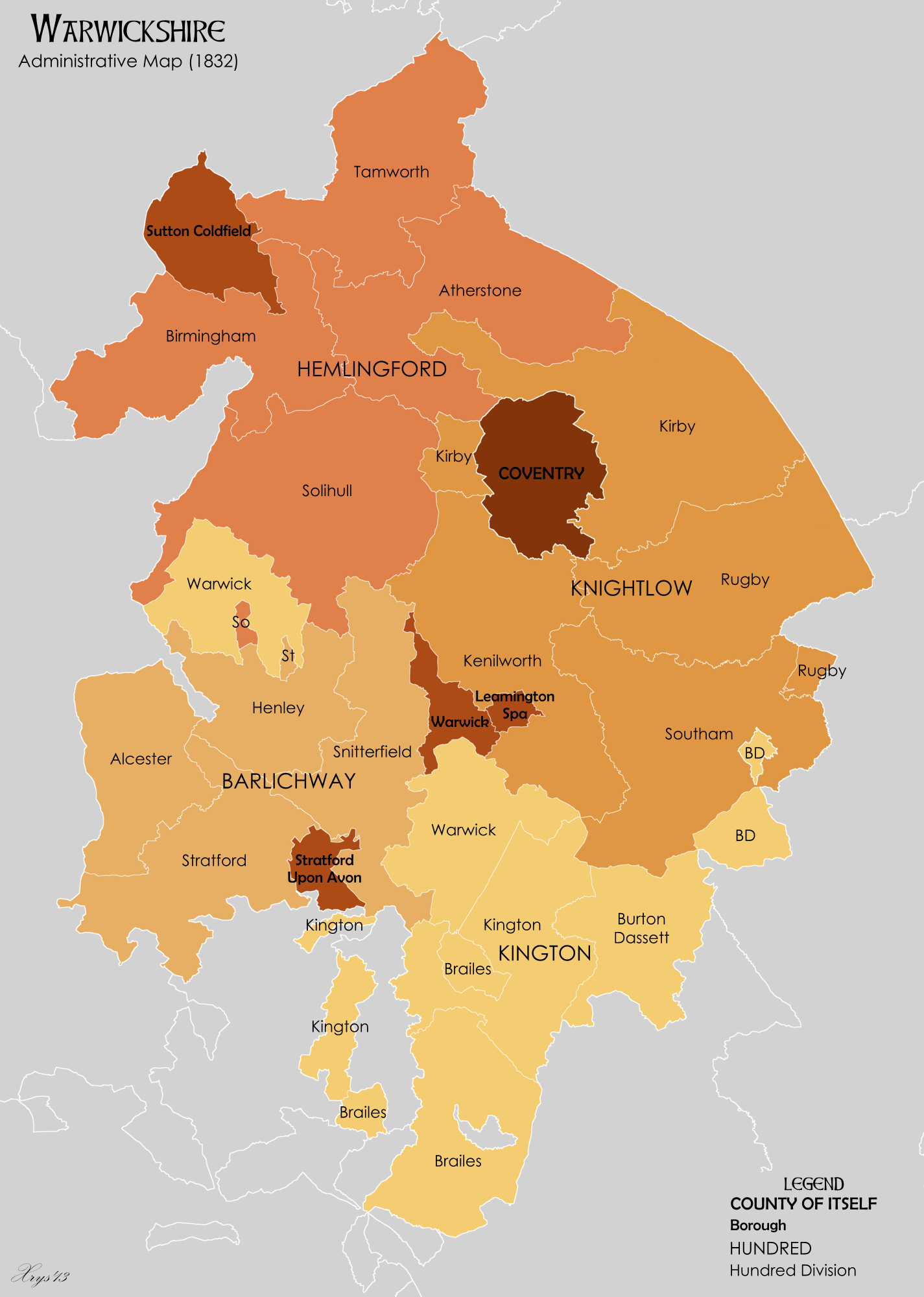
Warwickshire in 1832

Much of northwestern Warwickshire, including that area now forming part of Coventry, Solihull and Birmingham, was covered by the ancient Forest of Arden which was still the case at the time of the Domesday Book but much of which was later cut down to provide fuel for industrialisation. Thus the names of a number of places in the northwestern part of Warwickshire end with either the Old English "ley" or "leah" meaning a clearing in a forest or latterly the phrase "-in-Arden", such as Henley-in-Arden, Hampton-in-Arden and Tanworth-in-Arden. Historically, the "-in-Arden" suffix has also been used variously for many other places in the area, primarily for parochial purposes. Stoneleigh-in-Arden is perhaps the most notable example, while other examples such as Coleshill-in-Arden, Kenilworth-in-Arden and Knowle-in-Arden were seldom used. Even at the time of the Domesday Book the forested area has been calculated to be a quarter of the whole county or half of the northern area, the "Arden". The remaining southern area, not part of the forest, was called the Felden – from fielden. Historically, two towns dominate the county, Warwick, the county town and Coventry an important medieval city.

== Prehistoric ==
The Warwickshire area has almost certainly been inhabited since Prehistoric times, with the arrival of the first people half a million years ago during the Paleolithic or Old Stone Age. Small family groups roamed the thickly wooded landscape in search of food using simple stone tools such as hand-axes and scrapers. The total population of the area in those days may have been as low as 40. There is evidence of a temporary camp site at Waverley Wood Farm Pit, near Leamington Spa, whilst elsewhere, particularly in north Warwickshire, large numbers of hand-axes have been found suggesting repeated visits. This early phase came to an end with the onset of the Ice Age during which there is no evidence of a human presence in Warwickshire. Between 100,000 and 20,000 years ago, most of Warwickshire would have been submerged beneath Lake Harrison.

Human groups returned to the area around 10,500 years ago at the beginning of the Mesolithic period or Middle Stone Age. As the climate became warmer and the ice sheets retreated, the habitat changed and the forest was re-established. These people were hunter-gatherers who used bows and arrows and had domesticated dogs to help them in the chase. This period is characterised by the use of microliths, small delicately worked points set into arrowshafts. Other flint tools were used for working wood and bone and for cleaning skins. Some 20 sites are known in Warwickshire of which the most important is Blacklow Hill, near Warwick. Excavations here have revealed a substantial tool-making site. Other sites are known in the Avon valley and intensive fieldwork around Nuneaton has produced a large number of finds and evidence of several settlement sites.

Around 6,000 years ago the hunter-gatherer way of life was gradually being replaced by a simple farming economy, thus further modifying their habitat. These Neolithic or New Stone Age people raised sheep, pigs and cattle, and grew cereal crops. They used fire and stone axes to make clearings in the woodland where they could build farms and lay out fields. A flint arrowhead from this period has been recovered from Wolston.

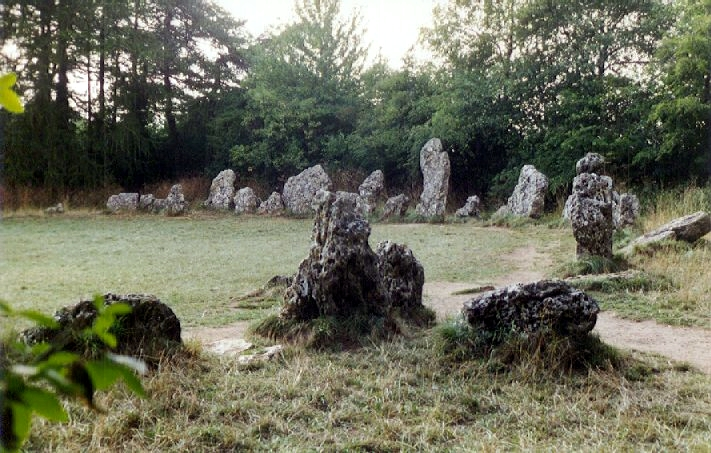
The Rollright Stones on the border with Oxfordshire, near Long Compton

The Bronze Age was a time of change, the scattered farming communities were coming together into tribal groups with powerful leaders. Metal was now in use and objects were being made out of copper and bronze. There are a number of weapons such as swords and spearheads cast in bronze found in Warwickshire. There is also evidence of people taking care of their appearance, two bronze razors have been recorded recently in South Warwickshire. Warwickshire being a rich agricultural area farming continued to expand and by 1500 BC much of the woodland had been cleared and settled.

In the Iron Age, the area contained small farmsteads such as the settlement at Wasperton, near Warwick. The main building was a thatched round house where the family and some of the livestock lived and around it workshops, storehouses and stock pens. The whole settlement was surrounded by a deep ditch which kept out wild animals. During times of trouble the population may have taken refuge in one of a number of hillforts such as Meon Hill near Stratford or Oldbury near Nuneaton. The remains of around twelve Iron Age hill forts have been found in the Warwickshire area.

== Roman period ==
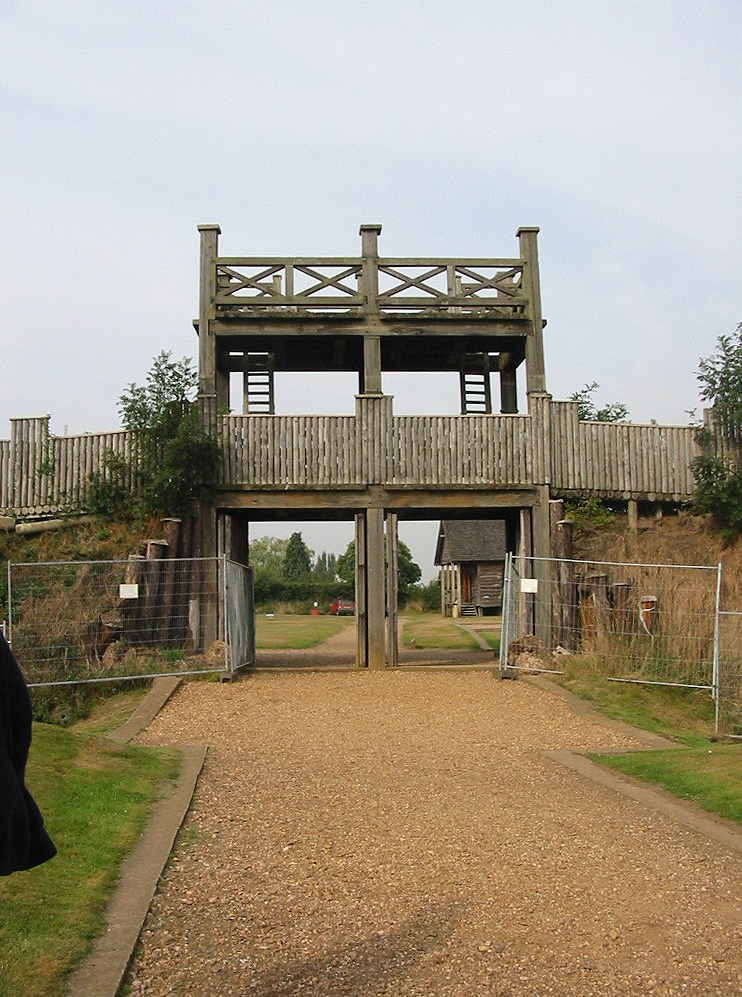
The reconstructed Roman Lunt Fort in Baginton near Coventry.

For the first few decades following the Roman invasion of Britain in AD 43, the Warwickshire area found itself at the frontier of Roman rule. The Watling Street and Fosse Way Roman roads were constructed, the Fosse Way marking the western frontier of Roman rule in Britain for several decades. The area was heavily fortified during this period and several military settlements were founded to defend the roads. Ryknild Street was constructed across the Warwickshire area and a fort was established in what is now the grounds of the Queen Elizabeth Hospital in Birmingham. The fort was built in about 48 AD by the Roman army as a base camp for its conquest of the Birmingham area and part of a network of forts across the Midlands linked by roads. It stood by Birmingham's earliest known road junction at the point where Icknield Street was met by Roman roads coming in from Droitwich and Penkridge. From here the road runs north to another fort over the county border into Staffordshire at Wall, Roman Etocetum near Lichfield.

Following the revolt in AD60/1 of the Iceni under their Queen Boudica most scholars have assumed that, after the burning of Colchester and London, Boudica followed Suetonius up Watling Street as he headed for his supply bases and lines of communication near to the milItary frontier. Suetonius offered battle in a strong defensive position described by Tacitus and many fruitless attempts have been made to be more precise regarding the site of the Battle of Watling Street, the last battle of Boudica. The historian, Dr Graham Webster has suggested it took place near Manduessedum ("the place of the war chariots"), modern day Mancetter and military finds of armour and military coinage relating to the 14th Legion, whom Tacitus records formed part of Suetonius' army, have been found in the region, giving weight to Webster's hypothesis. Another possible site put forward by Jack Lucas is the area east of Rugby, and whilst other theories exist for locations outside of Warwickshire, the exact location is unknown. After the defeat of the Iceni reinforcements were sent by the Romans from Germany and a great supply base was set up at a place called the Lunt in Baginton near Coventry which has the unique feature of a circular arena or gyrus for the breaking in of horses and which could have been a collecting point for Iceni horses after the battle.

Of Roman settlements in Warwickshire one of significant size was Alauna (modern day Alcester). Alcester was an important Roman settlement of around eighteen hectares laying bestride Ryknild Street in a loop of the River Arrow to the west of its confluence with the River Alne, underlying the modern town. Town defences have been confirmed only on the east side of the settlement's circuit, where they consist of a clay rampart dated to the "second century or later", fronted by a 2.75-metre wide wall which was probably not contemporary with the bank. There is also a suspected Roman fort around one kilometre to the south-east of the known Roman settlement located on Primrose Hill which overlooks both the confluence of the River Arrow with the River Alne and the junction of Ryknield Street with the road south from the Roman settlement at Salinae Droitwich Spa, known as the Salt Way after the main export from the area in Roman times. Items of bronze were recovered include a harness ring with a masked loop typical of those used by auxiliary cavalry. The earliest occupation date based on these findings appears to be Flavian. Other significant Roman settlements included Tripontium near Rugby and Manduessedum near Atherstone. The area around Manduessedum is known to have had an extensive pottery industry, which extended to near what is now Nuneaton, the remains of up to thirty pottery kilns having been found in this area.

== Anglo-Saxon period ==
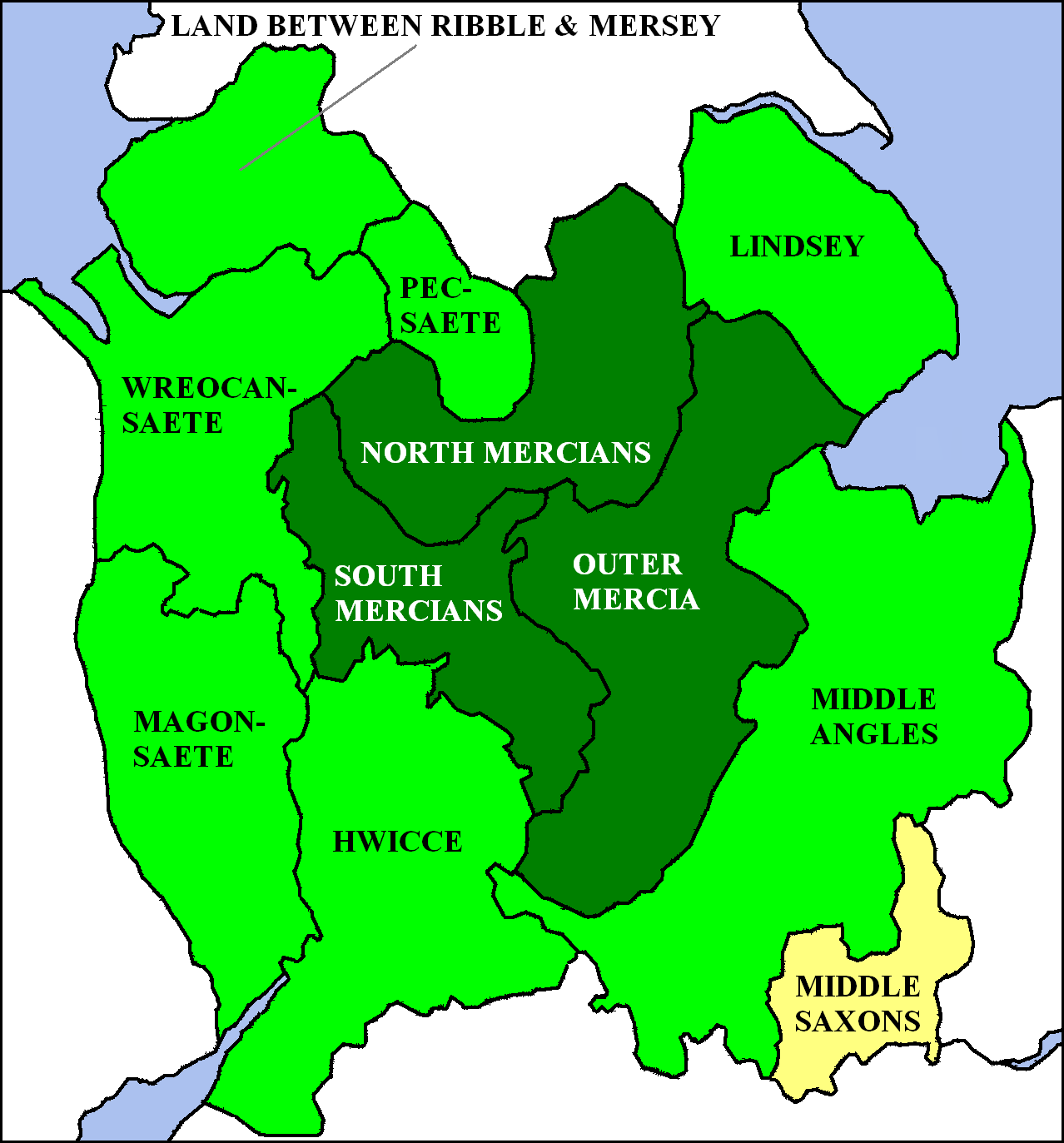
Kingdom of Mercia

Covering the period from the fall of the Roman Empire to the Norman Invasion of 1066.

After the Romans left Britain in the 5th century, the Warwickshire area was settled by Anglo Saxon tribes with the southern half initially belonging to the Hwicce and the northern half a core part of the Kingdom of Mercia. While its earliest boundaries will never be known, there is general agreement that the territory that was called "the first of the Mercians" in the Tribal Hidage covered much of south Derbyshire, Leicestershire, Nottinghamshire, Staffordshire and Northern Warwickshire.

Following the decline of the Mercian kingdom during the early 9th century, large parts of Mercia to the east of Warwickshire were ceded in 878 to Danish (Viking) invaders by King Alfred's Treaty of Wedmore with the Danish leader Guthrum. Watling Street, on the north-eastern edge of Warwickshire, became the boundary between the Danelaw to the east and the much reduced Mercia to the west.

Owing to its location at the frontier between two kingdoms, what is now Warwickshire needed to establish defences against the threat of Danish invasion. Between, 911 and 918 this task was undertaken by the "Lady of the Mercians" Æthelflæd, daughter of King Alfred, who was responsible for defences against the Danes at Tamworth (see Tamworth Castle) in 914 and the building of the first parts of Warwick Castle in 916. Periodic fighting between Danes and Saxons occurred until the 11th century. The establishment of the burh by Æthelflæd in 914 and Warwick's subsequent status as a shire town must have given some impetus to economic development. The town was, at any rate, sufficiently important to have had one of the two royal mints set up in Warwickshire (the other was at Tamworth). Coins are first known to have been issued in the reign of Athelstan (925-39). In the early 11th century, new internal boundaries within the Mercian kingdom were drawn and Warwickshire came into being as the lands administered from Warwick. The county was initially divided into ten hundreds, their names as given in the Domesday Book, were 'Berricestone', 'Bomelau', 'Coleshelle', 'Fernecumbe', 'Fexhole', 'Honesberie', 'Meretone', 'Patelau', 'Stanlei', and 'Tremelau', they were reduced to four 'sipesochae' — an early term which appears to be used exclusively in Warwickshire — in the 12th century and were named Barlichway, Hemlingford, Kineton or Kington, and Knightlow. The first recorded use of the name Warwickshire being in the year 1001, named after Warwick (meaning "dwellings by the weir"). Warwickshire was invaded in 1016 during the Christmas period by Cnut as part of his ultimately successful invasion against Æthelred the Unready and his son Edmund Ironside, destroying Coventry and massacring the local saint, Osberg, virgin and martyr.

== Middle Ages ==
From the Norman invasion of 1066 to the Battle of Bosworth in 1485.

The Norman conquest in 1066 brought with it the most active and notable period of military architecture resulting in the building of much of Warwick Castle and others at Kenilworth Maxstoke and Tamworth. Others existed at Allesley, Ansley, Aston Cantlow, Baginton, Beaudesert, Bickenhill, Birmingham, Brandon, Brinklow, Caludon at Wyken, Castle Bromwich, Coleshill, Coventry, Fillongley, Fulbrooke, Hartshill, Rugby and Studley, but in many cases only the earthworks can now be seen.

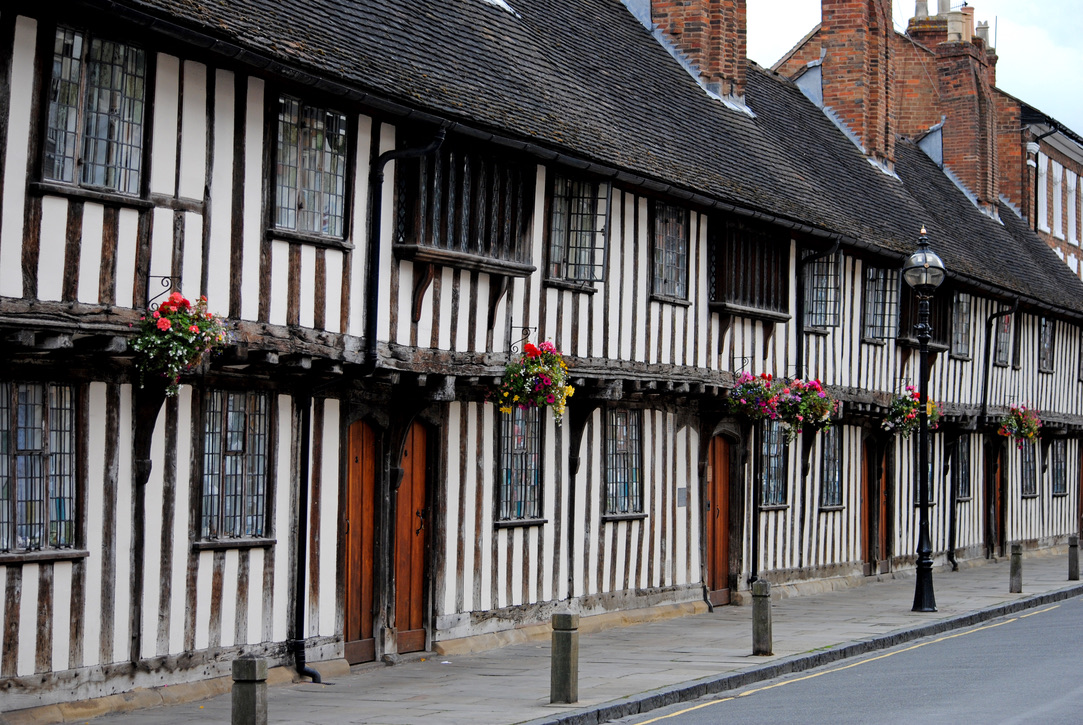
The Almshouses, Stratford-upon-Avon

Many of the main settlements of Warwickshire were established in the Middle Ages as market towns, including Birmingham, Bedworth, Nuneaton, Rugby and Stratford-upon-Avon amongst others.

The county was dominated throughout the medieval period by Coventry which became one of the most important cities in England and an important centre of wool and textiles trades. The city has held the title of episcopal see, Lichfield and Coventry, from the time of Earl Leofric early in the 11th century arising from the monastery he and his wife, Godiva, founded in 1043. Henry VI and his queen Margaret of Anjou made several visits to Coventry, and in 1451, as a mark of favour, Coventry and certain hamlets and villages adjacent became an entire and separate county, the County of the City of Coventry and the Bailiffs raised to the rank of Sheriffs. The Parliamentum Diabolicum assembled in Coventry in 1459 to pass bills of attainder for high treason against the Duke of York and other Yorkist nobles at the start of a new stage of the Wars of the Roses. The citizens remained loyal to Henry, and the Lancastrian cause, in his struggle with Edward IV and when Edward reached the city in 1470, the gates were closed against him. However, when Edward was safely seated on the throne, he withdrew the privileges of the city, only restoring them on payment of a fine of 500 marks

== Tudor and Stuart ==
From the accession of Henry VII in 1485 till the accession of the Hanoverian dynasty under George I in 1714.

Mary Queen of Scots was imprisoned at Coventry in 1566, where she lodged in the house of the mayor and again in 1569 where she was confined in the Bull Inn.

The Gunpowder Plot of 1605 was a Warwickshire conspiracy. The conspirators' principal aim was to kill King James, however another important objective was the kidnapping of the King's daughter, third in the line of succession, Princess Elizabeth. Housed at Coombe Abbey near Coventry, the Princess lived only ten miles north of Warwick, convenient for the plotters, most of whom lived in the Midlands. Once the King and his Parliament were dead, the plotters intended to install Elizabeth on the English throne as a titular Queen. Robert Catesby, the prime mover in the conspiratory, was a Warwickshire man, born probably at Bushwood, near Lapworth and John Grant, whose house at Northbrook, Snitterfield, was the rendezvous and powder magazine of the conspirators, was of the gentry of the county. Other conspirators rented houses in the neighbourhood, Ambrose Rokewood rented Clopton House, near Stratford, Everard Digby, to whom the task of rousing the Catholic gentry of the Midlands was assigned rented Coughton Court the home of the Throckmortons under the guise of a "hunting party". The Wrights moved to Lapworth and the rooms in London were rented by Thomas Percy from Henry Ferrers whose home of Baddesley Clinton was in turn rented to the Vaux sisters, relatives of Catesby. After the discovery of the plot and the arrest of Guy Fawkes was known, the conspirators rode from London to Warwickshire, meeting Digby's hunting party at the Red Lion at Dunchurch to discuss their plans.

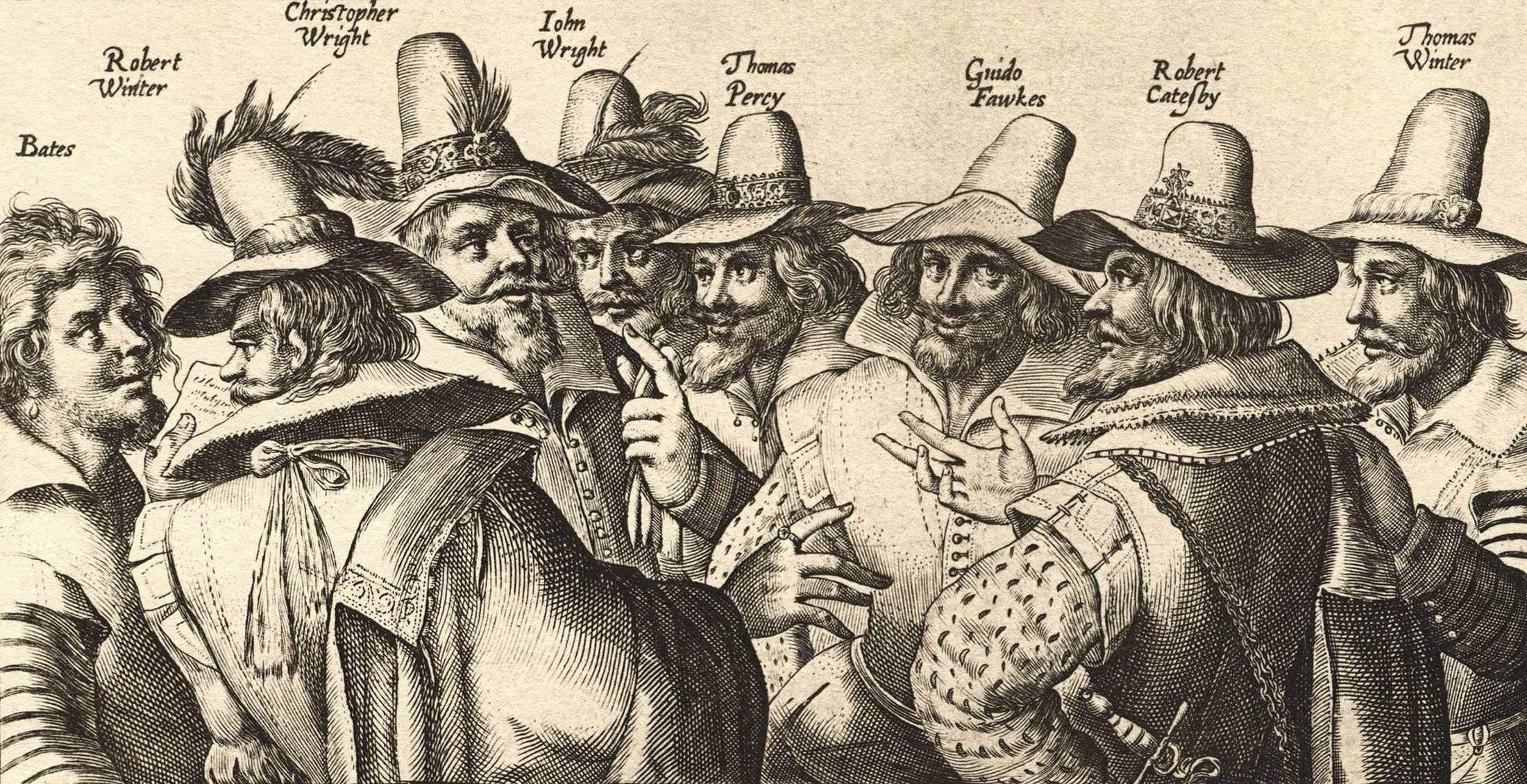
Conspirators of the infamous 1605 Gunpowder Plot

The final flight took place on 6 November, the fugitives raided Warwick Castle for supplies and continued to Norbrook to collect weapons. From there they continued their journey to Huddington. Thomas Bates left the group and travelled to Coughton Court to deliver a letter from Catesby, to Father Garnet and the other priests, informing them of what had transpired, and asking for their help in raising an army. Garnet replied by begging Catesby and his followers to stop their "wicked actions", before himself fleeing. The closing events now take place out of Warwickshire as they continued on to Holbeche House near Kingswinford in Staffordshire where they were captured.

During the English Civil War in the 17th century the county was generally on the Parliamentarian side, Lord Brooke of Warwick Castle being one of the fiercest enemies of the king. The Battle of Edgehill (1642) was fought in Warwickshire, near the Oxfordshire border. Prince Rupert, who was in charge of the Royalist forces, marched his soldiers through Henley in Arden in 1643 on his way to Birmingham and pillaged the neighbourhood. Charles II was assisted in his escape following his defeat at the Battle of Worcester in 1651 by Jane Lane who, disguising the king as her man-servant accompanied him across the county, passing through Wooton Wawen, Stratford-upon-Avon and Long Marston. The footpath the Monarch's Way commemorates the events and approximates the route of his escape where the modern landscape permits.

== Modern period ==
From the accession of George I to the present day.

During the 18th and 19th centuries Warwickshire became one of Britain's foremost industrial counties. The coalfields of northern Warwickshire were amongst the most productive in the country, and greatly enhanced the industrial growth of Coventry and Birmingham. One notable exception was the town of Leamington Spa which grew from a small village to a medium-sized town during the 19th century on the back of the fashionable spa water tourist movement of the time.

Warwickshire became a centre of the national canal system, with major arterial routes such as the Oxford Canal the Coventry Canal and later, what is now the Grand Union Canal being constructed through the county.

One of the first intercity railway lines: the London and Birmingham Railway ran through Warwickshire. And during the 19th century, the county developed a dense railway network.

Towns like Nuneaton, Bedworth, and Rugby also became industrialised. The siting of a major railway junction in the town was the key factor in the industrial growth of Rugby.

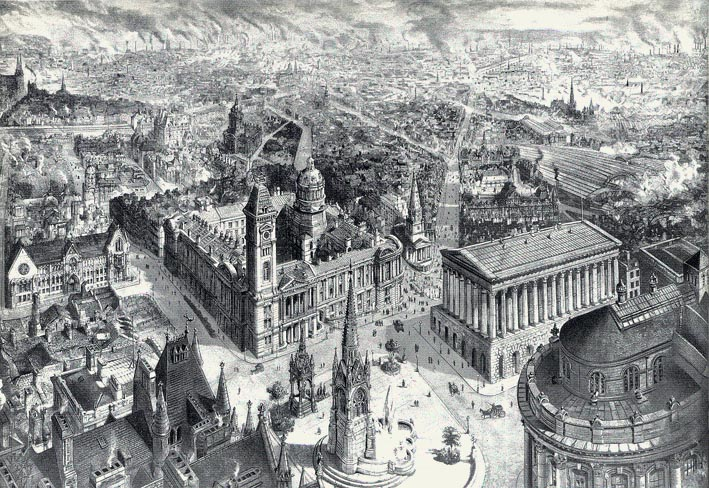
Birmingham in 1886

Towards the end of the 19th century Birmingham and Coventry had become large industrial cities in their own right, and so administrative boundaries had to change. In 1889 the administrative county of Warwickshire was created, and both Coventry and Birmingham became county boroughs which made them administratively separate from the rest of Warwickshire. Solihull later followed as a county borough. These boroughs remained part of the ceremonial county of Warwickshire, which expanded into Worcestershire and Staffordshire as Birmingham annexed surrounding villages.

This situation lasted until 1974, when the two cities along with Solihull were removed from Warwickshire altogether, and along with parts of Staffordshire and Worcestershire became a part of the new West Midlands metropolitan county.

The remaining post-1974 county of Warwickshire was left with a rather odd shape, which looks as if a large chunk has been bitten out of it where Coventry, Solihull and Birmingham used to be.

== See also ==
- History of Birmingham
- History of Coventry
