= County of the City of Coventry =

English county corporate

Coordinates: 52.4°N 1.5°W

The County of the City of Coventry was a county corporate of England which existed between 1451 and 1842.

The county corporate covered an area of around 20 square miles (52 km^{2}) and contained the city of Coventry and the surrounding villages of Ansty, Asthill, Biggin, Binley, Caludon, Exhall, Foleshill, Harnell, Henley, Horwell, Keresley, Pinley, Radford, Stoke, Styvechale, Walsgrave, Wood End, Whitley, Whoberley, and Wyken.

== History ==
During the medieval period Coventry, a town in Warwickshire, became an important city. King Henry VI granted Coventry the status of a county corporate, largely to reward the city for the support it had given him. This county corporate status enabled Coventry to control its own assize and jail, and the city's bailiffs became sheriffs – officers to the king. Coventry remained separate from the rest of Warwickshire, until disputes over ratings with the villages which formed the county resulted in its abolition by the Coventry Act 1842 (5 & 6 Vict. c.110) The Act provided that from 9 November 1842 the City and County of the City of Coventry shall... be taken to be in all respects Part of the County of Warwick, and within the Hundred of Knightlow. As well as merging Coventry with the rest of Warwickshire, the legislation resolved the Doubts which now prevail respecting the Boundary of the said City, by firmly setting the municipal limits.

The county corporate covered an area similar to that covered by the modern city. Apart from Ansty and Exhall, all of the places which formed part of the county corporate are now within the city boundaries.

== See also ==
- History of Coventry
- History of Warwickshire
