= Berwick-on-Tweed Act 1836 =

Act of the Parliament of the United Kingdom

Berwick-on-Tweed Act 1836 (Note: The citation of this act by this short title was authorised by section 1 of, and the first schedule to, the Short Titles Act 1896. Due to the repeal of those provisions it is now authorised by section 19(2) of the Interpretation Act 1978.)
- Act of Parliament
- Parliament of the United Kingdom
- Long title: An Act to make temporary Provision for the Boundaries of certain Boroughs.
- Citation: 6 & 7 Will. 4. c. 103
- Introduced by: Sir John Campbell (Attorney General) (Commons)
- Territorial extent: United Kingdom

Dates
- Royal assent: 20 August 1836
- Commencement: 20 August 1836 (Note: The Acts of Parliament (Commencement) Act 1793.)
- Repealed: 1 April 1974
Other legislation
Amended by	Municipal Corporations Act 1882
Repealed by	Local Authorities etc. (Miscellaneous Provision) (No. 2) Order 1974
Relates to	Municipal Corporations Act 1835

Status: Repealed

History of passage through Parliament

Text of statute as originally enacted

The Berwick-on-Tweed Act 1836 (6 & 7 Will. 4. c. 103) was an act of the Parliament of the United Kingdom passed to remedy some defects of the Municipal Corporations Act 1835 (5 & 6 Will. 4. c. 76). It was also referred to as the Municipal Boundaries Bill and the Municipal Corporation (Boundaries) Act 1836.

== Background ==
A more comprehensive amendment of the Municipal Corporations Act 1835 (5 & 6 Will. 4. c. 76) had been introduced by the second Melbourne ministry in the Commons in the 1836 parliamentary session (6 & 7 Will. 4), but the Lords objected to it, and so three short bills were introduced and passed the week before prorogation to deal with urgent uncontroversial changes. Besides the boundaries act (c. 103) were acts "for the better Administration of the Borough Fund in certain Boroughs" (c. 104) and "for the better Administration of Justice in certain Boroughs" (c. 105). The boundaries act was expressed as making "temporary Provision" because the government intended to bring in a broader measure later; however, the ensuing bill was rejected in 1838.

== Provisions ==
The act as passed had six sections:

- Section 1 replaced a provision of the 1835 act which annexed to a municipal borough any adjacent liberties. The new provision annexed only liberties which were within the municipal boundary. A consequence was that non-municipal land within a county corporate would be transferred to the adjoining county-at-large, as when the Ainsty of York was transferred from the city of York to the West Riding of Yorkshire.
- Section 2 reduced the municipal boundaries of Sunderland to the parish of Sunderland, the townships of Monkwearmouth and Monkwearmouth Shore, and the part of the townships of Bishopwearmouth and Bishopwearmouth Panns within a mile of Wearmouth Bridge. The 1835 act had used the Sunderland parliamentary boundary defined in 1832, which encompassed all of Bishopwearmouth, Bishopwearmouth Panns, and Southwick.
- Section 3 was a saver where a barrister who had assigned wards under the 1835 act specified places straddling the municipal boundary.
- Section 4 specified that local acts for poor relief would not be affected by the 1835 act.
- Section 5 specified that county rates would not be affected by the 1835 act
- Section 6 declared Berwick-upon-Tweed to be a county corporate. This applied for all purposes except parliamentary elections, in which the Berwick-upon-Tweed constituency remained a parliamentary borough rather than a county borough constituency.

== Amendment and repeal ==
The Municipal Corporations (New Charters) Act 1877 assigned the short title "The Municipal Corporation (Boundaries) Act, 1836". The Municipal Corporations Act 1882 repealed all sections of c. 103 except that relating to Berwick, which was amended by the Statute Law Revision (No. 2) Act 1888. The short title "Berwick-on-Tweed Act 1836" was given by the Short Titles Act 1896. The act was finally repealed by the Local Authorities etc. (Miscellaneous Provision) (No. 2) Order 1974, a statutory instrument made under the Local Government Act 1972, which had made sweeping changes to local government in England and Wales.

== Sources ==
- "Appendix; Cap. CIII: An Act to make temporary Provision for the Boundaries of certain Boroughs". A Compendious Abstract of the Public General Acts from the Law Journal. Vol. XIV: 6 William IV. London: E. B. Ince. 1836. pp. xxxv–xxxvii.
- Chitty, Joseph (1851). "Corporations (Municipal)". Chitty's Collection of Statutes: With Notes Thereon Intended as a Circuit and Court Companion. Vol. I (2nd ed.). Chancery Lane, London: S. Sweet. pp. 805–934.
