= Municipal Corporations (Ireland) Act 1840 =

Act of the Parliament of the United Kingdom reforming Irish local government

Municipal Corporations (Ireland) Act 1840 (Note: The citation of this act by this short title was authorised by section 1 of, and the first schedule to, the Short Titles Act 1896. Due to the repeal of those provisions it is now authorised by section 19(2) of the Interpretation Act 1978.)
- Act of Parliament
- Parliament of the United Kingdom
- Long title: An Act for the Regulation of Municipal Corporations in Ireland.
- Citation: 3 & 4 Vict. c. 108
- Territorial extent: Ireland (Note: Section 1.)

Dates
- Royal assent: 10 August 1840
- Commencement: 25 October 1840 (Note: Section 13.)
- Repealed: Northern Ireland: 1972; Republic of Ireland: 2001
Other legislation
Amended by	Dublin Corporation Act 1849; Exchequer and Audit Departments Act 1866; Juries Act (Ireland) 1871; Statute Law Revision Act 1874 (No. 2); Statute Law Revision Act 1875; Representation of the People Act 1918; Representation of the People Act 1949; Judicature (Northern Ireland) Act 1978
Repealed by	Northern Ireland: Local Government Act (Northern Ireland) 1972; Republic of Ireland: Local Government Act 2001
Relates to	Municipal Corporations Act 1835

Status: Repealed

Text of statute as originally enacted

The Municipal Corporations Act (Ireland) 1840 (3 & 4 Vict. c. 108) was an act of the Parliament of the United Kingdom. It was one of the Municipal Corporations (Ireland) Acts 1840 to 1888.

The act followed similar lines to the Municipal Corporations Act 1835 which reformed municipal boroughs in England and Wales. Prior to the passing of the act, there were 68 borough corporations in Ireland. However, many of them were ineffective, some were virtually defunct and none of them in any way representative of their populations. The act dissolved all but 10 of the corporations.

== Background ==
At the Acts of Union 1800, there had been 117 boroughs entitled to send MPs to the Irish House of Commons. From 1801, this number was reduced to 33 boroughs entitled to send MPs to the United Kingdom House of Commons.

== Defunct corporations ==
Commissioners were reported to inquire into the state of municipal corporations in Ireland. They found that 99 had actually exercised any functions in the previous century.

In addition, there were seven boroughs which were "at not very remote periods, Corporate Municipalities, acting, or at least constituted, under Royal Charters still on record".

Borough	County
Baltimore	Cork
Clogher	Tyrone
Dungarvan	Waterford
Lismore	Waterford
Mallow	Cork
Newry	Down
Tallagh	Waterford

There were five boroughs, "the existence either of a corporation or of burgage tenure is noticed in ancient records, but no charter of incorporation [was] discovered".

Borough	County
Clonmines	Wexford
Downpatrick	Down
Ratoath	Meath
Swords	Dublin
Taghmon	Wexford

There were six boroughs "though possessing charters empowering them to return Members of Parliament, never, as far as we have been able to trace, possessed the character of Municipal Corporations".

Borough	County
Antrim	Antrim
Doneraile	Cork
Lisburn	Antrim
Mullingar	Westmeath
Randalstown	Antrim
Rathcormac	Cork

There were 30 corporations that had become extinct since the Union.

Borough	County
Askeaton	Limerick
Athboy	Meath
Augher	Tyrone
Ballinakill	Queen's County
Ballyshannon	Donegal
Banagher	King's County
Bannow	Wexford
Blessington	Wicklow
Carrick-on-Shannon	Leitrim
Carysfort	Wicklow
Castlebar	Mayo
Donegal	Donegal
Dunleer	Louth
Feathard	Wexford
Fore	Westmeath
Gowran	Kilkenny
Granard	Longford
Harristown	Kildare
Jamestown	Leitrim
Killybegs	Donegal
Knocktopher	Kilkenny
Lanesborough	Longford
Limavady	Londonderry
New Castle near Lyons	Dublin
Old Leighlin	Carlow
Philipstown	King's County
Roscommon	Roscommon
St Johnston	Donegal
St Johnston	Longford
Tulsk	Roscommon

== The reformed corporations ==
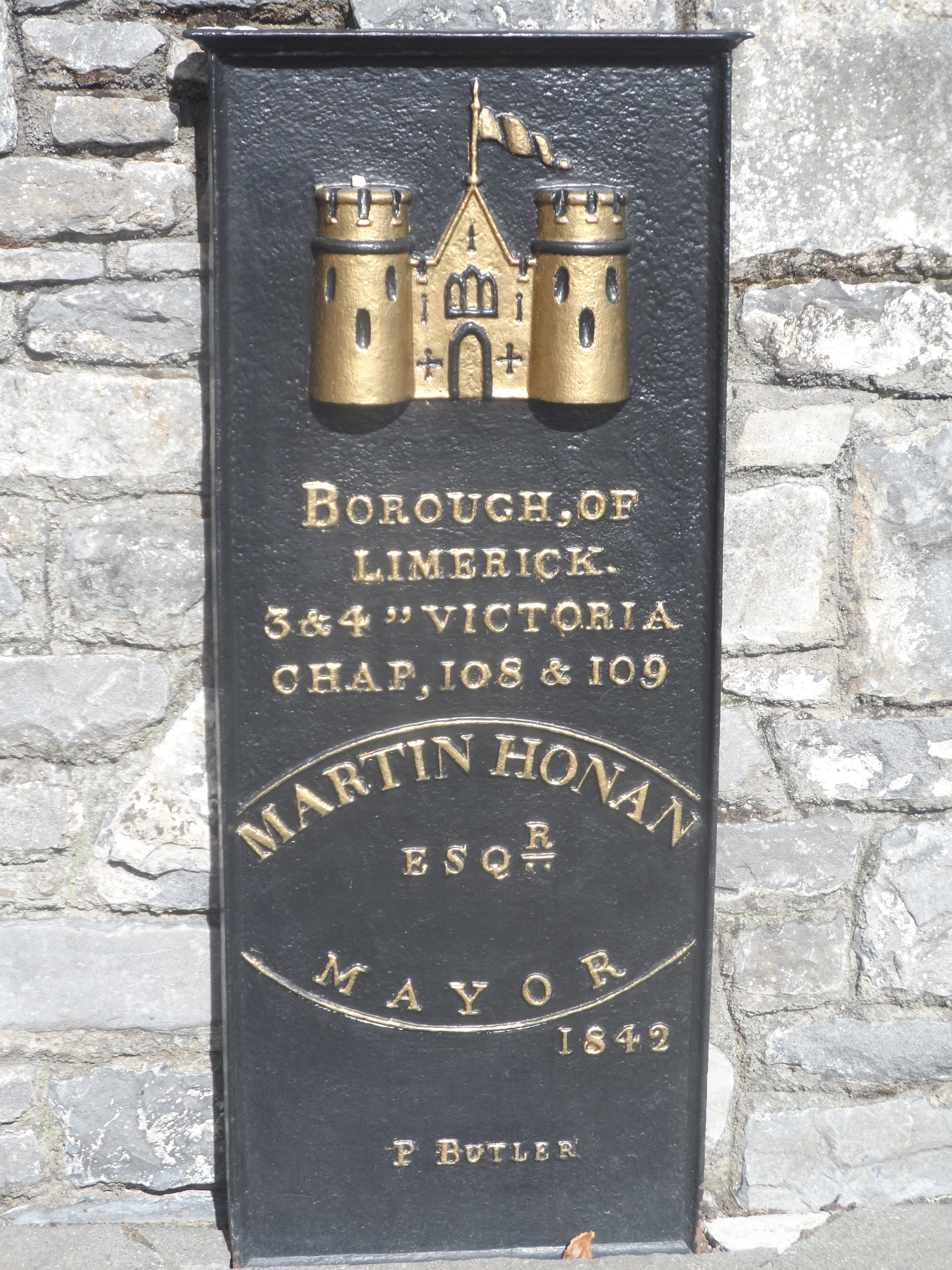
Borough boundary marker in Limerick, erected 1842 and citing this act.

The ten reformed corporations, which were named in Schedule A to the act were to be styled as Mayor, Aldermen and Burgesses, with the exception of Dublin where the title Right Honourable Lord Mayor was retained.

Borough	County
Belfast	Antrim and Down
Clonmel	Tipperary
Cork (County of the City)	Cork
Drogheda (County of the Town)	Louth and Meath
Dublin (County of the City)	Dublin
Kilkenny (County of the City; merging the former boroughs of Kilkenny and Irishtown)	Kilkenny
Limerick (County of the City)	Limerick
Londonderry (City)	Londonderry
Sligo	Sligo
Waterford (County of the City)	Waterford

== Dissolved boroughs ==
Under section 13 of the act, the remaining 58 borough corporations were dissolved on 25 October 1840. The extinguished boroughs were listed in schedules B and I of the act. Boroughs in schedule B could petition for a grant of a charter restoring borough status, as could any town with a population of more than 3,000.

In 1845, Wexford and Cashel both applied for restoration of their charters. This was granted in the case of Wexford.

Boroughs in Schedule B were also listed separately in Schedule G if it appeared from the Report that the body corporate had property exceeding a value of £100, and if Schedule H if they did not.

Boroughs in Schedule I were already effectively extinct at the time of the passing of the act, and so were not permitted to apply for such a charter.

Boroughs in Schedule B
Borough	County	G or H
Ardee	Louth	G
Armagh (City)	Armagh	H
Athlone	Roscommon and Westmeath	G
Athy	Kildare	G
Bandon or Bandon Bridge	Cork	H
Boyle	Roscommon	H
Callan	Kilkenny	H
Carlow	Carlow	G
Carrickfergus (County of the Town retained)	Antrim	G
Cashel (City)	Tipperary	G
Charleville	Cork	H
Cloghnakilty	Cork	G
Coleraine	Londonderry	G
Dingle	Kerry	H
Dundalk	Louth	H
Dungannon	Tyrone	H
Ennis	Clare	H
Enniscorthy	Wexford	H
Enniskillen	Fermanagh	H
Fethard	Wexford	H
Galway (County of the Town retained)	Galway	
Gorey	Wexford	H
Kells	Meath	G
Kinsale	Cork	G
Longford	Longford	H
Maryborough	Queen's	H
Monaghan	Monaghan	H
Naas	Kildare	G
Navan	Meath	H
New Ross	Wexford	G
Portarlington	Queen's and King's	H
Strabane	Tyrone	G
Tralee	Kerry	G
Trim	Meath	G
Tuam	Galway	G
Wexford	Wexford	G
Wicklow	Wicklow	G
Youghal	Cork	G

Boroughs in Schedule I
Borough	County
Ardfert	Kerry
Athenry	Galway
Baltinglass	Wicklow
Bangor	Down
Belturbet	Cavan
Carlingford	Louth
Castlemartyr	Cork
Cavan	Cavan
Charlemont	Armagh
Duleek	Meath
Hillsborough	Down
Inistioge	Kilkenny
Kilbeggan	Westmeath
Kildare	Kildare
Killileagh	Down
Kilmallock	Limerick
Lifford	Donegal
Midleton	Cork
Newtownards	Down
Thomastown	Kilkenny

== Town commissioners ==
Many of the extinguished boroughs had an additional form of local government in place, in the form of commissioners appointed under the Lighting of Towns (Ireland) Act 1828. Where such a body existed, it was deemed to be the successor to the corporation. Section 16 of the act provided that any borough dissolved with property worth more than £100, and which did not have commissioners under the 1828 act, should have a board of municipal commissioners established. In most cases, the commissioners appointed under the terms of the 1840 act eventually adopted the terms of the 1828 act or its replacement, the Towns Improvement (Ireland) Act 1854. By 1876, only Carrickfergus was still governed by commissioners appointed under the 1840 act.

== See also ==
- Municipal Corporations Act 1835
- Municipal Corporations Act
- Lighting of Towns (Ireland) Act 1828
- Towns Improvement (Ireland) Act 1854
- Acts of Union 1800
- Local government in Ireland
- Town commissioners

== Bibliography ==
Primary

- "The Municipal Corporations (Ireland) Act 1840 (3& 4 Vict. c. 108)" (PDF).
- Bills: 1835 HC; 1836 HC, HL, HC amend Lords; 1837 HC, recommit; 1837–8 HC, recommit, 2nd recommit, O'Connell amendments; 1838 HC, HL, HL and HC and HL; 1839 HC, commit, 2nd recommit, HL; 1840 HC recommit, HL.
- Municipal Corporations Commissioners (HC 1835 xxvii–xxviii and HC 1836 xxiv [23–29] ): Report, Supplement, Appendix: circuits reporting on towns Pt 1: S, Mid, W, SE, and pt NE, Pt 2: end NE and pt NW, Pt 3: end NW; Dublin Contents, pt 1 pp.1–116, pt 2 pp.117–2
- Municipal Boundaries Commissioners (HC 1837 xxix [301] 1) Report, Maps

Hansard debates on Municipal Corporations (Ireland) Bills, 1835–1840
Session	Commons			Lords			Other house's amendments		
Session	(1st &) 2nd r	Ctee	3rd r	2nd r	Ctee (& Rpt)	3rd r	L in C	C in L	2nd L in C
1835	1st r: Jul 31; 2nd r: Aug 10 12	Aug 13	Aug 17						
1836	Feb 29	Mar 7 8 14 18 21 22 23	Mar 28	Apr 18	Apr 26, May 9 16	May 18	May 19, Jun 10 13	Jun 17 27	Jun 30
1837	1st r: Feb 7 8; 2nd r: Feb 17	Feb 20 21 22, Mar 20	Apr 10 11	Apr 13 25	May 5 Jun 9				
1837–38	1st r: Dec 5 11; 2nd r: Feb 2	May 29, Jun 1 11 15 18	Jun 25	Jul 9	Jul 12	Jul 27	Aug 2	Aug 4	Aug 9
1839	1st r: Feb 14; 2nd r: Mar 1 8 22	Jun 28 Jul 4	Jul 15	Jul 22	Jul 25	Aug 5	Aug 12		
1840	Feb 14	Feb 24 28, Mar 3	Mar 9	Mar 23, May 4	May 14 15, Jun 12 19 29, Jul 6 Rpt: Jul 10	Jul 20 31	Aug 3	Aug 5 6	Aug 7

Secondary

- Callanan, Mark; Keogan, Justin F., eds. (2003). Local Government in Ireland Inside Out. Dublin.
- Roche, Desmond (1982). Local Government in Ireland. Dublin.
