= Municipal Corporations Act 1835 =

Act of the Parliament of the United Kingdom

Municipal Corporations Act 1835 (Note: The citation of this act by this short title was authorised by section 2 of, and the first schedule to, the Municipal Corporations (New Charters) Act 1877 (40 & 41 Vict. c. 69). The Municipal Corporations (New Charters) Act 1877 was repealed by the Municipal Corporations Act 1882. As to the continued use of this short title, see section 19(2) of the Interpretation Act 1978. Section 243 of the Municipal Corporations Act 1882 made provision as to the continued use of certain short titles mentioned in first schedule to that act. The said section 243 was repealed by the Statute Law Revision Act 1898. The Bill for the Statute Law Revision Act 1898 says the reason for the repeal of the said section 243 was: "As to s. 243 so much of the First Schedule as gives short titles not otherwise given is proposed for repeal". The bill then says that reason for the repeal of the entries in part II of the first schedule to Municipal Corporations Act 1882 (which does not mention the short title of Municipal Corporations Act 1835) specified by column 2 of the bill was "Sched. I., Pt. II. . . . as to parts in col. 2 the enactments referred to have been repealed by subsequent Acts except 40 & 41 Vict. c. 47 in Sched. I., Pt. II., which is proposed for repeal by the Bill"; and that part I of the first schedule (wherein the short title of the Municipal Corporations Act 1835 was mentioned) was repealed because it was "spent". As to the construction of references to the Municipal Corporations Act 1835, see sections 7(1) and 242 of, and the ninth schedule to, the Municipal Corporations Act 1882, and formerly section 191 of that act (the said section 191 was repealed by the Police Act 1964).)
- Act of Parliament
- Parliament of the United Kingdom
- Long title: An Act to provide for the Regulation of Municipal Corporations in England and Wales.
- Citation: 5 & 6 Will. 4. c. 76
- Territorial extent: England and Wales (Note: Section 1.)

Dates
- Royal assent: 9 September 1835
- Commencement: 9 September 1835 (Note: Section 8.); 1 January 1836
- Repealed: 1 January 1883
Other legislation
Amended by	Prison Act 1865; Municipal Corporation (Elections) Act 1869; Promissory Oaths Act 1871; Statute Law Revision Act 1874; Statute Law Revision Act 1875
Repealed by	Municipal Corporations Act 1882
Relates to	Municipal Corporations (Ireland) Act 1840

Status: Repealed

Text of statute as originally enacted

The Municipal Corporations Act 1835 (5 & 6 Will. 4. c. 76), sometimes known as the Municipal Reform Act, was an act of the Parliament of the United Kingdom that reformed local government in the incorporated boroughs of England and Wales. The legislation was part of the reform programme of the Whigs and followed the Reform Act 1832 (2 & 3 Will. 4. c. 45), which had abolished most of the rotten boroughs for parliamentary purposes.

== Royal commission ==
The government of Lord Grey, having carried out reform of parliamentary constituencies, turned its attention to local government. In February 1833 a select committee was appointed "to inquire into the state of the Municipal Corporations in England, Wales, and Ireland; and to report if any, and what abuses existed in them, and what measures, in their opinion, it would be most expedient to adopt, with a view to the correction of those abuses". The committee made their report in June 1833, having inquired into a handful of boroughs. The committee found that:

The jurisdiction of the corporations is defective in some case in consequence of the town having been extended beyond the limits of the ancient borough; and in other cases it is objectionable from extending to places that are distant, and more properly falling within the jurisdiction of the county magistrates.

The principle which prevails of a small portion of corporators choosing those who are to be associated with them in power, generally for life, is felt to be a great grievance. The tendency of this principle is to maintain an exclusive system, to uphold local, political and religious party feelings, and is destructive of that confidence which ought always to be reposed in those who are intrusted with control, judicial or otherwise, over their fellow citizens…

The committee are further led to infer that corporations, as now constituted, are not adapted to the present state of society… To make corporations instruments of useful and efficient local government, it seems to be essential that the corporate officers should be more popularly chosen…[and] that their proceedings should be open and subject to control of public opinion.

The committee did not believe that they had sufficient powers to carry out a full review of the existing system. They instead recommended the appointment of a royal commission, and that the country be divided into districts with a commissioner responsible for enquiring into boroughs in each district.

The royal commission was appointed by letters patent passed under the great seal. The commission, which was dominated by Radicals, had eighteen members, with two assigned to each district or circuit:

- North Midland: Richard Whitcombe and Alexander Edward Cockburn
- Eastern: George Long and John Buckle
- South Western: Henry Roscoe and Edward Rushton
- Southern: John Elliot Drinkwater and Edward John Gambier
- Western: Charles Austin and James Booth
- Midland: Peregrine Bingham and David Jardine
- Northern: Fortunatus Dwarris and Sampson Augustus Rambull
- North-Western: George Hutton Wilkinson and Thomas Jefferson Hogg
- South-Eastern: Thomas Flowers Ellis and Daniel Maude

The commission's secretary was Joseph Parkes.

=== Report ===
The commission issued its report in 1835. Altogether 285 towns had been investigated. The main conclusions of the report were:

- The corporations were exclusive bodies with no community of interest with the town after which they were named.
- The electorate of some corporations was kept as small as possible.
- Some corporations merely existed as "political engines" for maintaining the ascendancy of a particular party.
- Members of corporations usually served for life and the corporate body was a self-perpetuating entity. Roman Catholics and Dissenters, although no longer disabled from being members, were systematically excluded.
- Vacancies rarely occurred and were not filled by well-qualified persons.
- Some close corporations operated in almost complete secrecy, sometimes secured by oath. Local residents could not obtain information on the operation of the corporation without initiating expensive legal actions.
- The duties of the mayor were, in some places, completely neglected.
- Magistrates were appointed by the corporations on party lines. They were often incompetent and lacked the respect of the inhabitants.
- Juries in many boroughs were exclusively composed of freemen. As the gift of freedom lay with the corporation, they were political appointees and often dispensed justice on a partisan basis.
- Policing in the boroughs was often not the responsibility of the corporation but of one or more bodies of commissioners. An extreme example was the City of Bath, which had four districts under different authorities, while part of the city had no police whatever.
- Borough funds were "frequently expended in feasting, and in paying the salaries of unimportant officers" rather than on the good government of the borough. In some places funds had been expended on public works without adequate supervision, and large avoidable debts had accrued. This often arose from contracts being given to members of the corporation or their friends or relations. Municipal property was also treated as if it were only for the use of the corporation and not the general population.

The commission concluded its report by stating that:

...the existing Municipal Corporations of England and Wales neither possess nor deserve the confidence or respect of Your Majesty's subjects, and that a thorough reform must be elected, before they can become, what we humbly submit to Your Majesty they ought to be, useful and efficient instruments of local government.

== Effects of the act ==
The act established a uniform system of municipal boroughs, to be governed by town councils elected by ratepayers (termed 'burgesses'). The reformed boroughs were obliged to publish their financial accounts and were liable to audit. Each borough was to appoint a salaried town clerk and treasurer who were not to be members of the council.

The act reformed 178 boroughs. The Burgh Reform Act 1833 (3 & 4 Will. 4. c. 46) had already carried similar reforms in Scotland. Similar legislation would not be introduced in Ireland until the Municipal Reform Act 1840 (3 & 4 Vict. c. 108). There remained more than 100 unreformed boroughs, which generally either fell into desuetude or were replaced later under the terms of the act. The last of these was not reformed or abolished until 1886. The reform excluded the City of London, which remained under jurisdiction of the same corporation. Many of the reformed boroughs had their municipal boundaries adjusted to match the parliamentary boundaries which had been reformed three years earlier under the Parliamentary Boundaries Act 1832 (2 & 3 Will. 4. c. 64).

The act allowed unincorporated towns to petition for incorporation. The industrial towns of the Midlands and North quickly took advantage of this, with Birmingham and Manchester becoming boroughs as soon as 1838. Altogether, 62 additional boroughs were incorporated under the act.

The new corporations had annual elections, with a third of the councillors up for election each year. The council also elected aldermen to serve on the council, with a six-year term. Towns were divided into wards. The act also changed the enrollment of new freemen and burgesses in each of the boroughs, changing the criteria to be solely due to occupancy and payment of rates, and abolishing any previous criteria in earlier borough charters.

The act was repealed "subject to the exceptions and qualifications in this Act mentioned" by section 5 of, and part I of the first schedule to, the Municipal Corporations Act 1882 (45 & 46 Vict. c. 50).

== The 178 reformed boroughs ==
The list shows the style by which the unreformed corporation was known, and the date of its governing charter. In most cases this was the last in a succession of charters granted by a number of monarchs. In a few cases boroughs had no charter, or the charter was lost.

Number	Borough	Style of unreformed corporation	Governing charter	County	Present governance
1	Aberystwyth	Mayor and Burgesses of the Town, Borough, and Liberty of Aberystwith	1544	Cardiganshire	Aberystwyth Town Council
2	Abingdon	Mayor, Bailiffs, and Burgesses of the Borough of Abingdon	1557	Berkshire	Abingdon Town Council
3	Andover	Bailiff, approved Men, and Burgesses of the Borough of Andover	1599	Hampshire	Test Valley Borough Council (charter trustees 1974–1976)
4	Arundel	Mayor, Steward and Burgesses of Arundel	1586	Sussex	Arundel Town Council
5	Banbury	Mayor, Aldermen, and Burgesses of the Borough of Banbury in the County of Oxford	1554	Oxfordshire and Northamptonshire	Banbury Town Council (charter trustees 1974–2000)
6	Barnstaple	Mayor, Aldermen, and Burgesses of the Borough and Parish of Barnstaple in the County of Devon	1610	Devon	Barnstaple Town Council
7	Basingstoke	Mayor, Aldermen and Burgesses of Basingstoke	1622, confirmed 1641	Hampshire	Basingstoke and Deane Borough Council (charter trustees 1974–1978)
8	Bath	Mayor, Aldermen, and Citizens of the City of Bath	1590 and 1794	Somerset	Became district in 1974 as is; merged in 1996 to district of Bath and North East Somerset; charter trustees extant
9	Beaumaris	Aldermen, Bailiffs and Burgesses of Beaumaris	1562	Anglesey	Beaumaris Town Council
10	Beccles	Portreeve, Steward and Burgesses of Beccles	1584	Suffolk	Beccles Town Council
11	Bedford	Mayor, Bailiffs, and Burgesses of the Town of Bedford	1684/5	Bedfordshire	Bedford Borough Council (charter trustees until 1975)
12	Berwick-upon-Tweed (Note: Berwick-upon-Tweed was de jure "not in any county" until the Berwick-on-Tweed Act 1836 made it a county of itself; before and since it has often been de facto treated as part of Northumberland.)	Mayor, Bailiffs, and Burgesses of the Borough of Berwick-upon-Tweed	1604	Northumberland	Berwick-upon-Tweed Borough Council
13	Beverley	Mayor, Aldermen, and Burgesses of the Borough of Beverley in the County of York	1573	Yorkshire	Charter trustees (Beverley Borough Council from 1974 to 1996)
14	Bewdley	Bailiffs, Burgesses, and Inhabitants of the Town and Borough of Bewdley	1606, 1708	Worcestershire	Bewdley Town Council
15	Bideford	Mayor, Aldermen, and Capital Burgesses of the Borough, Town, and Manor of Bideford in the County of Devon	1573, 1610	Devon	Bideford Town Council
16	Blandford Forum	Bailiff, Seneschal and Capital Burgesses of Blandford Forum	1605	Dorset	Blandford Forum Town Council
17	Bodmin	Mayor, Aldermen and Councilmen of Bodmin	1798 (The previous corporation, under a charter of 1594 had become extinct in 1789)	Cornwall	Bodmin Town Council
18	Boston	Mayor, Aldermen, and Burgesses of the Borough of Boston	1545, 1573	Lincolnshire	Boston Borough Council
19	Brecknock	Bailiff, Aldermen, and Burgesses of the Borough of Brecon	1556	Breconshire	Brecon Town Council
20	Bridgnorth	Bailiffs, Aldermen, and Burgesses of the Borough of Bridgnorth	1546	Shropshire	Bridgnorth Town Council (rural borough 1967–1974)
21	Bridgwater	Mayor, Aldermen, Bailiffs and Burgesses of the Borough of Bridgwater	1468, 1587, 1628	Somerset	Bridgwater Town Council (charter trustees 1974–2003)
22	Bridport	Bailiffs and Burgesses of the Borough of Bridport	1667	Dorset	Bridport Town Council
23	Bristol (County of the City)	Mayor, Burgesses, and Commonalty of the City of Bristol	1664	Gloucestershire and Somerset	Bristol City Council
24	Buckingham	Bailiff, Principal Burgesses, and Steward of the Borough of Buckingham	1553	Buckinghamshire	Buckingham Town Council
25	Bury St Edmunds	Alderman and Burgesses of Bury St. Edmunds in the County of Suffolk	1606	Suffolk	St Edmundsbury Borough Council until 2003, when separate Bury St Edmunds Town Council formed
26	Calne	Steward and burgesses of the Borough of Calne	1668	Wiltshire	Calne Town Council
27	Cambridge	Mayor, Bailiffs, and Burgesses of the Borough of Cambridge	1605	Cambridgeshire	Cambridge City Council
28	Canterbury (County of the City)	Mayor and Commonalty of the City of Canterbury	1609	Kent	Canterbury City Council
29	Cardiff	Bailiffs, Aldermen, and Burgesses of the Town of Cardiff	1581 and 1608	Glamorgan	City of Cardiff 1974–1996, County and City of Cardiff since 1996
30	Cardigan	Mayor, Common-Council and Burgesses of the Town and Borough of Cardigan	1583	Cardiganshire	Cardigan Town Council
31	Carlisle (City)	Mayor, Aldermen, Bailiffs, and Citizens of the City of Carlisle	1637	Cumberland	Carlisle City Council
32	Carmarthen	Mayor, Burgesses, and Commonalty of the Borough of Carmarthen	1604, 1764	Carmarthenshire	Carmarthen Town Council
33	Carnarvon	Mayor, Bailiffs, and Burgesses of the Town and Borough of Caernarvon	1559	Carnarvonshire	Caernarfon Royal Town Council
34	Chard	Portreeve and Bailiffs of the Borough of Chard	1683	Somerset	Chard Town Council
35	Chepping Wycombe	Mayor, Aldermen, Bailiffs and Burgesses of the Borough of Chepping Wycombe	1663	Buckinghamshire	High Wycombe Charter Trustees
36	Chester (County of the City)	Mayor and Citizens of the City of Chester	1506	Cheshire	Cheshire West and Chester Council (CWAC)
37	Chesterfield	Mayor, Aldermen, and Burgesses of the Borough of Chesterfield	1662	Derbyshire	Chesterfield Borough Council
38	Chichester (City)	Mayor, Aldermen, and Citizens of the City of Chichester	1685	Sussex	Chichester City Council (civil parish)
39	Chippenham	Bailiff and Capital Burgesses of the Borough of Chippenham	1553	Wiltshire	Chippenham Town Council (charter trustees 1974–1980)
40	Chipping Norton	Bailiffs and Burgesses of the Borough of Chipping Norton	1608	Oxfordshire	Chipping Norton Town Council
41	Clitheroe	Bailiffs and Burgesses of the Borough of Clitheroe in the County of Lancaster	1604	Lancashire	Clitheroe Town Council
42	Colchester	Mayor and Commonalty of the Borough of Colchester	1818	Essex	Colchester Borough Council
43	Congleton	Mayor, Aldermen, and Burgesses of the Borough of Congleton in the County of Chester	1625	Cheshire	Congleton Town Council
44	Coventry (City and County of the City) (Note: In 1842 the County of the City of Coventry was joined to Warwickshire)	Mayor, Bailiffs, and Commonalty of the City of Coventry	1621	Warwickshire	Coventry City Council
45	Dartmouth or Clifton-Dartmouth-Hardness	Mayor, Bailiffs, and Burgesses of the Borough of Clifton Dartmouth Hardness in the County of Devon	1604	Devon	Dartmouth Town Council
46	Daventry	Bailiff, Burgesses and Commonalty of the Borough of Daventry	1674/5	Northamptonshire	Daventry Town Council (charter trustees 1974–2003)
47	Deal	Mayor, Jurats, and Commonalty of the Town of Deal in the County of Kent	1699 (Note: Prior to this charter, Deal was governed a deputy and assistants appointed by the Corporation of Sandwich)	Kent	Deal Town Council (charter trustees 1974–1996)
48	Denbigh	Aldermen, Bailiffs, and Burgesses of the Borough of Denbigh	1662	Denbighshire	Denbigh Town Council
49	Derby	Mayor, Aldermen, and Burgesses of the Borough of Derby	1683	Derbyshire	Derby City Council
50	Devizes	Mayor and Burgesses of the Borough of Devizes	1625	Wiltshire	Devizes Town Council
51	Doncaster	Mayor, Aldermen, and Burgesses of the Borough of Doncaster in the County of York	1688	Yorkshire	Doncaster Metropolitan Borough Council
52	Dorchester	Mayor, Bailiffs, Aldermen, and Burgesses of the Borough of Dorchester in the County of Dorset	1629	Dorset	Dorchester Town Council
53	Dover	Mayor, Jurats, and Commonalty of the Town and Port of Dover	1684	Kent	Dover Town Council (charter trustees 1974–1996)
54	Droitwich	Bailiffs and Burgesses of the borough of Droitwich	1625	Worcestershire	Droitwich Spa Town Council (originally named Droitwich)
55	Durham (City)	Mayor, Aldermen, and Commonalty of the City of Durham and Framwelgate	1780 (granted by the Bishop of Durham)	County Durham	Durham City Council
56	East Retford	Bailiffs, Aldermen and Commonalty of the Borough of East Retford	1607	Nottinghamshire	East Retford Charter Trustees
57	Evesham	Mayor, Aldermen, and Burgesses of the Borough of Evesham	1605	Worcestershire	Evesham Town Council
58	Exeter (County of the City)	Mayor, Bailiffs, and Commonalty of the City of Exeter	1537, renewed 1770	Devon	Exeter City Council
59	Eye	Bailiffs, Burgesses and Commonalty of the Borough of Eye	1558 and 1574 confirmed 1697	Suffolk	Eye Town Council
60	Falmouth	Mayor, Aldermen, and Burgesses of the Town of Falmouth in the County of Cornwall	1661	Cornwall	Falmouth Town Council
61	Faversham	Mayor, Jurats and Freemen of the Town of Faversham	1546, regranted 1685	Kent	Faversham Town Council
62	Flint	Mayor, Bailiffs, and Burgesses of the Borough of Flint	1360 by Edward, the Black Prince as Earl of Chester	Flintshire	Flint Town Council
63	Folkestone	Mayor, Jurats and Commonalty of the Town of Folkestone	1313 and 1668	Kent	Folkestone Town Council (charter trustees 1974–2004)
64	Gateshead	Boroughholders and Freemen of the Borough of Gateshead	1695	County Durham	Gateshead Metropolitan Borough Council
65	Glastonbury	Mayor and Burgesses of the borough of Glastonbury	1705	Somerset	Glastonbury Town Council
66	Gloucester (County of the City)	Mayor and Burgesses of the City of Gloucester in the County of the City of Gloucester	1672	Gloucestershire	Gloucester City Council
67	Godalming	Warden, Bailiff and Assistants of the Borough of Godalming	1575	Surrey	Godalming Town Council
68	Godmanchester	Bailiffs, Assistants and Commonalty of the Borough of Godmanchester	1605	Huntingdonshire	Godmanchester Town Council (combined with Huntingdon 1961–1982)
69	Grantham	Aldermen, Burgesses and Commonalty of the Borough of Grantham	1463	Lincolnshire	Grantham Charter Trustees
70	Gravesend	Mayor, Jurats, and Inhabitants of the Villages and Parishes of Gravesend and Milton in the County of Kent	1562, renewed by Charles I	Kent	Gravesham Borough Council
71	Great Grimsby	Mayor and Burgesses of the Town of Grimsby in the County of Lincoln	1688	Lincolnshire	Great Grimsby Charter Trustees (borough council 1974–1996)
72	Great Torrington	Mayor, Aldermen and Chief Burgesses of the Borough of Great Torrington	1686	Devon	Great Torrington Town Council
73	Great Yarmouth	Mayor, Aldermen, Burgesses, and Commonalty of the Borough of Great Yarmouth in the County of Norfolk.	1703	Norfolk and Suffolk	Great Yarmouth Borough Council
74	Guildford	Mayor and Burgesses of the Town of Guldeford in the County of Surrey	1686	Surrey	Guildford Borough Council
75	Harwich	Mayor and Burgesses of the Borough of Harwich	1604	Essex	Harwich Town Council
76	Hastings	Mayors, Jurats, and Commonalty of the Town and Port of Hastings in the County of Sussex	1588, confirmed by Charles II	Sussex	Hastings Borough Council
77	Haverfordwest (County of the Town)	Mayor, Sheriffs, Bailiffs, and Burgesses of the County of the Town of Haverfordwest, or of the Town and County of the Town of Haverfordwest	1610	Pembrokeshire	Haverfordwest Town Council
78	Helston	Mayor and Aldermen of the Borough of Helston	1774	Cornwall	Helston Town Council
79	Hereford (City)	Mayor, Aldermen, and Citizens of the City of Hereford	1697	Herefordshire	Hereford City Council (civil parish)
80	Hertford	Mayor, Aldermen, and Commonalty of the Borough of Hertford	1680	Hertfordshire	Hertford Town Council
81	Huntingdon	The Mayor, Aldermen and Burgesses of the Borough of Huntingdon	1630	Huntingdonshire	Huntingdon Town Council (combined with Godmanchester 1961–1982)
82	Hythe	The Mayor, Jurats and Commonalty of the Town and Port of Hythe	1575	Kent	Hythe Town Council
83	Ipswich	Bailiffs, Burgesses, and Commonalty of the Town or Borough of Ipswich.	1665	Suffolk	Ipswich Borough Council
84	Kendal	Mayor, Aldermen, and Burgesses of the Borough of Kirby-in-Kendal in the County of Westmorland	1636	Westmorland	Kendal Town Council
85	Kidderminster	High Bailiff and Commonalty of the Borough of Kidderminster in the County of Worcester	1827	Worcestershire	Kidderminster Charter Trustees
86	King's Lynn or Lynn Regis	Mayor and Burgesses of the Borough of Lynn Regis	1684	Norfolk	King's Lynn and West Norfolk Borough Council
87	Kingston upon Hull (County of the Town)	Mayor and Burgesses of the Town or Borough of Kingston-upon-Hull	1688	Yorkshire	Hull City Council
88	Kingston upon Thames	Bailiffs and Freemen of the Borough of Kingston upon Thames	1628	Surrey	Kingston upon Thames London Borough Council
89	Lancaster	Mayor, Bailiffs, and Commonalty of the Town of Lancaster in the County Palatine of Lancaster	1819	Lancashire	Lancaster City Council
90	Launceston otherwise Dunheved	Mayor and Aldermen of Dunheved, otherwise Launceston	1555	Cornwall	Launceston Town Council
91	Leeds	Mayor, Aldermen, and Burgesses of the Borough of Leeds in the County of York	1661	Yorkshire	City of Leeds City Council
92	Leicester	Mayor, Bailiff, and Burgesses of the Borough of Leicester	1630	Leicestershire	Leicester City Council
93	Leominster	Bailiffs and Burgesses of the Borough of Leominster	1665	Herefordshire	Leominster Town Council
94	Lichfield (County of the City)	Bailiff and Citizens of the City of Lichfield	1664	Staffordshire	Lichfield City Council (civil parish) – charter trustees 1974–1980
95	Lincoln (County of the City)	Mayor, Sheriffs, Citizens, and Commonalty of the City of Lincoln	1628	Lincolnshire	Lincoln City Council
96	Liskeard	Mayor and Burgesses of the Borough of Liskerret otherwise Liskeard in the County of Cornwall	1580	Cornwall	Liskeard Town Council
97	Liverpool	Mayor, Bailiffs, and Burgesses of the Borough of Liverpool	1207, 1626	Lancashire	Liverpool City Council
98	Llandovery	Bailiff and Burgesses of the Borough of Llanymtheverye	1590	Carmarthenshire	Llandovery Town Council
99	Llanidloes	Mayor, Aldermen and Burgesses of the Borough of Llanidloes	1449 by John Tiptoft, Lord of Powys	Montgomeryshire	Llanidloes Town Council
100	Louth	Warden and Six Assistants of the Town of Louth and Free School of King Edward the Sixth in Louth	1605, 1830	Lincolnshire	Louth Town Council
101	Ludlow	Bailiffs, Burgesses, and Commonalty of the Town and Borough of Ludlow	1665	Shropshire	Ludlow Town Council (rural borough 1967–1974)
102	Lyme Regis	Mayor and Capital Burgesses of the Borough of Lyme Regis	William III	Dorset	Lyme Regis Town Council
103	Lymington	Mayor and Burgesses of the Borough of Lymington	Incorporated by virtue of charters granted by Earls of Devon, confirmed by judgment given under a writ of quo warranto in 1578	Hampshire	Charter trustees until 1979, now split between four parishes
104	Macclesfield	Mayor, Aldermen, and Burgesses of the Borough of Macclesfield	1684	Cheshire	Cheshire East Council
105	Maidenhead	Mayor, Bridgemasters, Burgesses and Commonalty of the Town of Maidenhead	1685	Berkshire	Windsor and Maidenhead Borough Council
106	Maidstone	Mayor, Jurats, and Commonalty of the King's Town and Parish of Maidstone in the County of Kent	1748	Kent	Maidstone Borough Council
107	Maldon	Mayor, Aldermen, and Capital Burgesses and Commonalty of Maldon	1810	Essex	Maldon Town Council (originally had charter trustees)
108	Marlborough	The Mayor and Burgesses of the Borough of Marlborough	1576	Wiltshire	Marlborough Town Council
109	Monmouth	Mayor, Bailiffs, and Commonalty of the Town and Borough of Monmouth	1666	Monmouthshire	Monmouth Town Council
110	Morpeth	Bailiffs and Free Burgesses of the Borough of Morpeth	1662	Northumberland	Castle Morpeth Borough Council (separate town council subsequently formed)
111	Neath	Portreeve, Aldermen, and Burgesses of the Borough of Neath	1685	Glamorgan	Neath Town Council
112	New Windsor	Mayor, Bailiffs, and Burgesses of the Borough of New Windsor in the County of Berks	1664	Berkshire	Windsor and Maidenhead Borough Council
113	Newark	Mayor and Aldermen of the Borough of Newark in the County of Nottingham	1673	Nottinghamshire	Newark-on-Trent Town Council
114	Newbury	Mayor, Aldermen, and Burgesses of the Borough of Newbury	1596	Berkshire	Newbury Town Council (charter trustees 1974–1997)
115	Newcastle-under-Lyme	Mayor, Bailiffs, and Burgesses of Newcastle-under-Lyne in the County of Stafford	1590	Staffordshire	Newcastle-under-Lyme Borough Council
116	Newcastle upon Tyne (County of the City)	Mayor and Burgesses of the Town of Newcastle upon Tyne in the County of the Town of Newcastle upon Tyne	1604	Northumberland	Newcastle upon Tyne City Council
117	Newport	Mayor, Aldermen, and Chief Burgesses of the Borough of Newport in the Isle of Wight in the County of Southampton	1637	Hampshire (Isle of Wight)	extinguished; Medina Borough Council from 1974 to 1995
118	Newport	Mayor, Aldermen, and Burgesses of the Borough of Newport	1685	Monmouthshire	Newport City Council
119	Northampton	Mayor, Bailiffs, and Burgesses of Northampton	1797	Northamptonshire	Northampton Town Council
120	Norwich (County of the City)	Mayor, Sheriffs, Citizens, and Commonalty of the City of Norwich	1683	Norfolk	Norwich City Council
121	Nottingham (County of the Town)	Mayor and Burgesses of the Town of Nottingham	1449	Nottinghamshire	Nottingham City Council
122	Oswestry	Mayor, Aldermen, Common Councilmen, and Burgesses of Oswestry	1674	Shropshire	Oswestry Borough Council (rural borough 1967–1974)
123	Oxford (City)	Mayor, Bailiffs, and Commonalty of the City of Oxford in the County of Oxford	1635	Oxfordshire	Oxford City Council
124	Pembroke	Mayor, Bailiffs, and Burgesses of the Town and Borough of Pembroke	1485	Pembrokeshire	Pembroke Town Council
125	Penryn	Mayor, Aldermen and Councillors of the Borough of Penryn	1621	Cornwall	Penryn Town Council
126	Penzance	Mayor, Aldermen, and Commonalty of the Town of Penzance in the County of Cornwall	1614	Cornwall	Penzance Town Council (charter trustees 1974–1980)
127	Plymouth	Mayor and Commonalty of the Borough of Plymouth	1572	Devon	Plymouth City Council
128	Pontefract	Mayor, Aldermen, and Burgesses of the Borough or Town of Pontefract	1607	Yorkshire	Wakefield City Council
129	Poole (County of the Town)	Mayor, Bailiffs, Burgesses, and Commonalty of the Town of Poole	1568	Dorset	Poole Borough Council
130	Portsmouth	Mayor, Aldermen, and Burgesses of the Borough of Portsmouth in the County of Southampton	1627	Hampshire	Portsmouth City Council
131	Preston	Mayor, Bailiffs, and Burgesses of the Borough of Preston in the County Palatine of Lancaster	1685	Lancashire	Preston City Council
132	Pwllheli	Mayor, Bailiffs and Burgesses of the Borough of Pwllheli	Elizabeth I	Carnarvonshire	Pwllheli Town Council
133	Reading	Mayor, Aldermen, and Burgesses of the Borough of Reading in the County of Berks	1638	Berkshire	Reading Borough Council
134	Richmond	Mayor and Aldermen of the Borough of Richmond in the County of York	1668	Yorkshire	Richmond Town Council
135	Ripon	Mayor, Burgesses, and Commonalty of the Borough of Ripon in the County of York	1604	Yorkshire	Ripon City Council (civil parish)
136	Rochester (City)	Mayor and Citizens of the City of Rochester in the County of Kent	1629	Kent	Medway Borough Council
137	Romsey	Mayor, Aldermen, and Burgesses of the Town of Romsey Infra in the County of Southampton	1607, 1692	Hampshire	Romsey Town Council
138	Ruthin	Aldermen, Common Councilmen, and Burgesses of the Borough of Ruthin	1284, 1508	Denbighshire	Ruthin Town Council
139	Rye	Mayor, Jurats and Freemen of the Town of Rye	No charter separate from Cinque Ports	Sussex	Rye Town Council
140	Saffron Walden	Mayor and Aldermen of the Town of Saffron Walden in the County of Essex	1694	Essex	Saffron Walden Town Council
141	Salisbury or New Sarum (City)	Mayor and Commonalty of the City of New Sarum in the County of Wilts	1611	Wiltshire	Salisbury City Council
142	Sandwich	Mayor, Jurats and Commonalty of the Town of Sandwich	1684	Kent	Sandwich Town Council
143	Scarborough	Bailiffs and Burgesses of the Town of Scarborough	1684	Yorkshire	Scarborough Borough Council
144	Shaftesbury	Mayor and Capital Burgesses of the Borough of Shaftesbury	1604, 1665	Dorset	Shaftesbury Town Council
145	Shrewsbury	Mayor, Aldermen, and Burgesses of the Town of Shrewsbury in the County of Salop	1685	Shropshire	Shrewsbury and Atcham Borough Council
146	South Molton	Mayor, Capital Burgesses and Commonalty of the Borough of South Molton	1684	Devon	South Molton Town Council
147	Southampton (County of the Town)	Mayor, Bailiffs, and Burgesses of the Town of Southampton		Hampshire	Southampton City Council
148	Southwold	Bailiffs and Commonalty of the Borough of Southwold	1689	Suffolk	Southwold Town Council
149	St Albans	Mayor and Aldermen and Burgesses of the Borough of Saint Albans in the County of Hertford	1685	Hertfordshire	St Albans City Council
150	St Ives	Mayor and Burgesses of the Borough of St Ives	1685	Cornwall	St Ives Town Council
151	Stafford	Mayor, Aldermen, and Burgesses of the Borough of Stafford	1827	Staffordshire	Stafford Borough Council
152	Stamford	Mayor, Aldermen, and Capital Burgesses of the Town or Borough of Stamford in the County of Lincoln	1685	Lincolnshire	Stamford Town Council
153	Stockport	Mayor, Aldermen, and Burgesses of the Borough of Stockport	No charter, corporation appointed by Court Leet	Cheshire and Lancashire	Stockport Metropolitan Borough Council
154	Stockton-on-Tees	Mayor, Aldermen, Burgesses, and Commonalty of the Borough of Stockton	No charter extant, borough by prescription (Note: "Boroughs by prescription" existed by custom from time immemorial without a charter or other formal document of incorporation.)	County Durham	Stockton-on-Tees Borough Council
155	Stratford-on-Avon	Mayor, Aldermen and Burgesses of the Borough of Stratford on Avon	1674	Warwickshire	Stratford-upon-Avon Town council
156	Sudbury	Mayor, Aldermen, and Burgesses of the Borough of Sudbury	Charles II	Suffolk and Essex	Sudbury Town Council
157	Sunderland	Mayor, Aldermen, and Commonalty of the Borough of Sunderland	1634 (granted by the Bishop of Durham)	County Durham	Sunderland City Council
158	Swansea	Portreeve, Aldermen, and Burgesses of the Borough of Swansea	Borough by prescription (charter of 1685 not adopted)	Glamorgan	City and County of Swansea
159	Tamworth	Bailiffs and Burgesses of the Borough of Tamworth	1663	Staffordshire and Warwickshire	Tamworth Borough Council
160	Tenby	Mayor, Bailiffs, and Burgesses of the Borough of Tenby	1631	Pembrokeshire	Tenby Town Council
161	Tenterden	The Mayor, Jurats and Commons of the Town and Hundred of Tenterden	1600	Kent	Tenterden Town Council
162	Tewkesbury	Bailiffs, Burgesses, and Commonalty of the Borough of Tewkesbury in the County of Gloucester	1698	Gloucestershire	Tewkesbury Borough Council (although a separate Town Council also exists)
163	Thetford	Mayor, Aldermen and Commonalty of the Borough of Thetford	1573	Norfolk and Suffolk	Thetford Town Council
164	Tiverton	Mayor and Burgesses of the Town and Parish of Tiverton in the County of Devon	1723	Devon	Tiverton Town Council
165	Totnes	Mayor, Aldermen and Burgesses of the Borough of Totness	1596	Devon	Totnes Town Council
166	Truro	Mayor, Aldermen, and Capital Burgesses of the Borough of Truro	1589	Cornwall	Truro City Council (civil parish)
167	Wallingford	Mayor, Aldermen and Burgesses of the Borough of Wallingford	1663	Berkshire	Wallingford Town Council
168	Walsall	Mayor and Commonalty of the Borough and Foreign of Walsall in the County of Stafford	1627, confirmed 1661	Staffordshire	Walsall Metropolitan Borough Council
169	Warwick	Mayor, Aldermen, and Burgesses of the Borough of Warwick	1693,	Warwickshire	Warwick Town Council
170	Wells (City)	Mayor, Masters, and Burgesses of the City or Borough of Wells in the County of Somerset	1589	Somerset	Wells City Council (civil parish)
171	Welshpool	Bailiffs and Burgesses of the Borough of Poole in the County of Montgomery	1615	Montgomeryshire	Welshpool Town Council
172	Wenlock	Burgesses of the Borough of Wenlock	1631	Shropshire	Much Wenlock Town Council (rural borough 1966–1974)
173	Weymouth and Melcombe Regis	Mayor, Aldermen, Bailiffs, Burgesses, and Commonalty of the Borough and Town of Weymouth and Melcombe Regis in the County of Dorset	1803	Dorset	Weymouth and Portland Borough Council
174	Wigan	Mayor, Aldermen, and Burgesses of the Borough of Wigan	1662	Lancashire	Wigan Metropolitan Borough Council
175	Winchester (City)	Mayor, Bailiffs, and Commonalty of the City of Winchester	1588	Hampshire	Winchester City Council
176	Wisbech	Burgesses of the Borough of Wisbech	1646	Cambridgeshire	Wisbech Town Council
177	Worcester (County of the City)	Mayor, Aldermen, and Citizens of the City of Worcester	1621	Worcestershire	Worcester City Council
178	York (County of the City)	Mayor and Commonalty of the City of York	1679	Yorkshire	City of York Council (unitary)

== Subsequent developments ==
Section 50 of the act, from the words "Provided always," to the end of that section, was repealed by section 1(1) of, and part XXX of schedule 1 to, the Statute Law (Repeals) Act 1977, which came into force on 16 June 1977.

== See also ==
- Municipal Corporations Act
