= City-county =

City-county may refer to:

- Consolidated city-county, in the United States
- City-county (Poland), a city with county rights in Poland
- corporate county, a city with county status, formerly in Great Britain and Ireland

== See also ==
- Independent city
- Metropolitan county, urban county designation in England since 1974
