= Municipal Corporation (Elections) Act 1869 =

Act of the Parliament of the United Kingdom

Municipal Corporation (Elections) Act 1869 (Note: This short title was conferred on this act by section 2 of, and the first schedule to, the Municipal Corporations (New Charters) Act 1877 (40 & 41 Vict. c. 69).)
- Act of Parliament
- Parliament of the United Kingdom
- Long title: An Act to shorten the Term of Residence required as a Qualification for the Municipal Franchise, and to make provision for other purposes.
- Citation: 32 & 33 Vict. c. 55
- Territorial extent: England and Wales (Note: Section 11.)

Dates
- Royal assent: 2 August 1869
- Commencement: 2 August 1869 (Note: The Acts of Parliament (Commencement) Act 1793.)
- Repealed: 1 January 1882
Other legislation
Amends	Municipal Corporations Act 1835
Amended by	Municipal Elections Act 1875
Repealed by	Municipal Corporations Act 1882

Status: Repealed

Text of statute as originally enacted

The Municipal Corporation (Elections) Act 1869 (32 & 33 Vict. c. 55), sometimes called the Municipal Franchise Act 1869 or the Municipal Corporation (Election) Act 1869, was an act of the Parliament of the United Kingdom.

The bill for this act was the Municipal Franchise Bill. Bill 85 was introduced by John Tomlinson Hibbert.

Under the act, unmarried women ratepayers received the right to vote in local government elections. This right was confirmed in the Local Government Act 1894 (56 & 57 Vict. c. 73) and extended to include some married women. By 1900, more than 1 million women were registered to vote in local government elections in England.

== Subsequent developments ==
Sections 6 and 7 of the act were repealed by section 12 of, and the second schedule to, the Municipal Elections Act 1875 (38 & 39 Vict. c. 40).

The whole act was repealed by section 5 of, and the first schedule to, the Municipal Corporations Act 1882 (45 & 46 Vict. c. 50), which came into force on 1 January 1882.

== See also ==
- Elections in the United Kingdom
- Reform Acts
- Women's suffrage in the United Kingdom

== Bibliography ==
- Lely, John Mounteney. "Municipal Corporations (Elections) Act 1869". Chitty's Collection of Statutes of Practical Utility. Fourth Edition. Henry Sweet. Stevens and Sons. Chancery Lane, London. 1880. Volume 1. Title "Corporations". Pages 1405 to 1408.
- Paterson, William. "Municipal Franchise Act". The Practical Statutes of the Session 1869. Horace Cox. Wellington Street, Strand, London. 1869. Pages 126 to 131.
