= Municipal Corporations Act (India) =

Municipal Corporations Act are the statutory acts created for governing of municipal corporations across various Indian towns and cities. Municipal Corporation mechanism in India was introduced during British Rule with formation of municipal corporation in Madras (Chennai) in 1688, later followed by municipal corporations in Bombay (Mumbai) and Calcutta (Kolkata) by 1726. The passing of municipal corporations acts by state governments is necessary for the creation of municipal corporations in any city of state.

== History and administration ==
Municipal Corporations Acts help in laying strong guidelines for the functioning of municipal corporations which helps in city’s development. In India the foundation for the democratic form of municipal governance had started 135 years back through Lord Ripon’s resolution of local self-government. Any Indian city with population of more than 10 lakhs or 1 million qualifies to become corporation. If the population of any area increases to more than 10000 than it will be declared as separate ward.

Municipal Acts in India are of below three types:

- General municipalities acts across states.
- Independent acts for setting up municipal corporations.
- Individual municipal corporations in specific cases.

== Municipalities with Municipal Corporations Acts ==
In India there are many cities having municipal corporations which are governed by different municipal acts.

=== State-based Municipal Corporations Act list ===
In India different municipal corporations are governed by acts applicable as below.

==== Andhra Pradesh ====
Rank	City	District	Municipal Corporation	Municipal Corporation Act
1	Visakhapatnam	Visakhapatnam	Greater Visakhapatnam Municipal Corporation	Visakhapatnam Municipal Corporation Act 1979
2	Vijayawada	Krishna	Vijayawada Municipal Corporation	Vijayawada Municipal Corporation Act, 1981
3	Guntur	Guntur	Guntur Municipal Corporation	Andhra Pradesh Municipal Corporation Act, 1981
4	Kurnool	Kurnool	Kurnool Municipal Corporation	Andhra Pradesh Municipal Corporation Act, 1981
5	Nellore	SPS Nellore	Nellore Municipal Corporation	Andhra Pradesh Municipal Corporation Act, 1981
6	Rajamahendravaram	East Godavari	Rajamahendravaram Municipal Corporation	Andhra Pradesh Municipal Corporation Act, 1981
7	Kadapa	YSR Kadapa	Kadapa Municipal Corporation	Andhra Pradesh Municipal Corporation Act, 1981
8	Kakinada	East Godavari	Kakinada Municipal Corporation	Andhra Pradesh Municipal Corporation Act, 1981
9	Tirupati	Chittoor	Tirupati Municipal Corporation	Andhra Pradesh Municipal Corporation Act, 1981
10	Eluru	West Godavari	Eluru Municipal Corporation	Andhra Pradesh Municipal Corporation Act, 1981
11	Anantapur	Anantapur	Anantapur Municipal Corporation	Andhra Pradesh Municipal Corporation Act, 1981
12	Vizianagaram	Vizianagaram	Vizianagaram Municipal Corporation	Andhra Pradesh Municipal Corporation Act, 1981
13	Ongole	Prakasham	Ongole Municipal Corporation	Andhra Pradesh Municipal Corporation Act, 1981
14	Machilipatnam	Krishna	Machilipatnam Municipal Corporation	Andhra Pradesh Municipal Corporation Act, 1981
15	Chittoor	Chittoor	Chittoor Municipal Corporation	Andhra Pradesh Municipal Corporation Act, 1981
16	Srikakulam	Srikakulam	Srikakulam Municipal Corporation	Andhra Pradesh Municipal Corporation Act, 1981
17	Mangalagiri	Guntur	Mangalagiri Tadepalle Municipal Corporation	A. P. Municipal Corporations Act, 1994

==== Assam ====
Rank	City	District	Municipal Corporation	Municipal Corporation Act
1	Guwahati	Kamrup Metropolitan	Guwahati Municipal Corporation	Assam Municipal Corporation Act 1979

==== Bihar ====
Rank	City	District	Municipal Corporation	Municipal Corporation Act
1	Patna	Patna	Patna Municipal Corporation	Bihar Municipal Act, 2007
2	Gaya	Gaya	Gaya Municipal Corporation	Bihar Municipal Act, 2007
3	Bhagalpur	Bhagalpur	Bhagalpur Municipal Corporation	Bihar Municipal Act, 2007
4	Muzaffarpur	Muzaffarpur	Muzaffarpur Municipal Corporation	Bihar Municipal Act, 2007
5	Munger	Munger	Munger Municipal Corporation	Bihar Municipal Act, 2007
6	Purnia	Purnia	Purnia Municipal Corporation	Bihar Municipal Act, 2007
7	Purnia	Darbhanga	Darbhanga Municipal Corporation	Bihar Municipal Act, 2007

==== Telangana ====
Rank	City	District	Municipal Corporation	Municipal Corporation Act
1	Hyderabad	Hyderabad	Greater Hyderabad Municipal Corporation; Cyberabad Municipal Corporation; Malkajgiri Municipal Corporation	Core Urban Region (Integrated Governance) Bill, 2026

== Legal implications of Municipal Corporations Act ==
1. For failure to adhering to Bangalore Municipal Corporation Act, 1949, High Court of Karnatka, in a Public Interest Litigation (PIL) petition, issued notices to the Karnatka State Government and Commissioners of 11 city corporations, in implementing uniform and effective guidelines in constituting ward committees and area sabhas across the State.
2. Mumbai Municipal Corporation Act, 1888, needs to be amended for revision in the number of wards in Mumbai and guidelines of Maharashtra Municipal Corporation Act, 1949 needs to be followed for revisions of ward numbers in other places of Maharashtra as the State Government plans to increase the number of seats in all municipal corporations. There are 27 municipal corporations in Maharashtra.
3. For failure to comply with Maharashtra Municipal Corporation Act 1949, and related Rules Pune activist serves legal notice to Pune Municipal Corporation (PMC) administration.
4. Municipal Corporation Act 1995, Andhra Pradesh Municipalities Act 1965, Vishakapatnam Municipal Corporation Act, 1979, Vijayawada Municipal Act 1981, and Andhra Pradesh Municipal Corporation Act 1994 were amended by state of Andhra Pradesh for permission to mobile additional financial resources.

== Related Links ==
List of municipal corporations in India
