= Harnell =

Harnell is a surname. Notable people with the surname include:

- Jess Harnell (born 1963), American voice actor and singer
- Joe Harnell (1924–2005), American composer, musician, and music arranger
- Tony Harnell (born 1962), American rock singer

== See also ==
- Farnell
- Harrell (name)
