= County corporate =

Towns formally independent from their counties

A county corporate or corporate county was a type of subnational division used for the administration of justice in certain towns and cities in England, Wales, and Ireland. They arose when the monarch gave a borough corporation the right to appoint its own sheriffs, separating that borough from the jurisdiction of the sheriff of the county in which it lay.

They were legally described as forming separate counties, but in both contemporary usage whilst they existed and in discussion by modern historians the counties corporate are generally distinguished from the wider counties. From Tudor times onwards lord lieutenants were appointed to oversee the militia for each county; with the exceptions of London and Haverfordwest, each county corporate was covered by the lieutenant of an adjoining county. Provisions were also made allowing court cases arising from counties corporate to be heard at the assizes for the adjoining county.

"County corporate" was not a statutory name, but was a commonly used description for such towns and cities. Other terms used included county of itself or city and county. They were similar to an independent city or consolidated city-county in other countries. The equivalent term in Scotland was a county of a city.

In England and Wales, county boroughs were created from 1889 onwards, which were similar in that they were places that were independent from their surrounding counties for local government functions. There was some overlap between the places that were counties corporate for judicial purposes and the places that were county boroughs for local government purposes. Sheriffs retained some judicial functions until 1972 when the courts system was reformed. The counties corporate were abolished in England and Wales in 1974, although some of the former counties corporate still retain the right to appoint a ceremonial sheriff.

== History ==
=== England and Wales ===
Counties were originally areas used for the administration of justice. Each had a sheriff, who was usually appointed by the monarch. Separately, boroughs were certain towns or cities which had a degree of self-government. The rights and functions belonging to each borough varied, depending on what had been included in the borough's charter. The inhabitants of a borough were deemed in law to be capable of acting as a single corporate person, allowing the borough to enter into contracts and litigation. The ruling body of a borough was commonly called its corporation, although the terms 'town council' and 'city council' were also used. Many boroughs had rights under their charters to hold certain types of court cases.

Around 1132, the Corporation of London was given the right to appoint two sheriffs to jointly serve the city and the county of Middlesex in which it was located, instead of the monarch appointing a Sheriff of Middlesex with jurisdiction over London as had previously been the case. Other boroughs later campaigned for the right to appoint their own sheriffs too, which would allow them to hold all types of court case. In 1373, Bristol was the next borough to be given the right to appoint its own sheriff. Bristol's elevation to being its own county was partly on the basis of its growing size and importance, and partly because the borough straddled the counties of Gloucestershire and Somerset (both of which held their courts some distance from Bristol) which had caused problems with the administration of the borough.

Other large boroughs later followed suit. The charters giving boroughs the rights to appoint their own sheriff generally did not use the term 'county corporate', instead using wording which made the borough into a new county and directed that the sheriff for that new county should be chosen by the borough corporation, rather than the monarch as was the case for other counties. One exception was the charter awarded to Coventry in 1451, which did explicitly use the term 'county corporate'. Although not a statutory term, 'county corporate' came to be used to describe these places which were legally counties, but where the right to appoint a sheriff rested with the borough corporation rather than with the monarch.

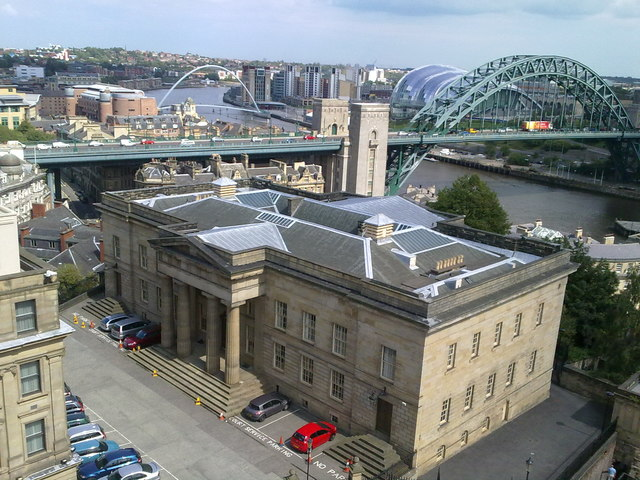
Moot Hall, Newcastle upon Tyne: Served as main courthouse for Northumberland, and so was made an exclave of that county surrounded by the county corporate of Newcastle upon Tyne

Some of the counties corporate were also the county town of the wider county in which they lay. In nine such cases (Carmarthen, Chester, Exeter, Gloucester, Lincoln, Newcastle upon Tyne, Norwich, Nottingham, and York) the area around the courthouse for the wider county was excluded from the county corporate, making such courthouses exclaves of the wider county. As well as larger towns and cities, some counties corporate were created to deal with specific local problems, such as border conflict (in the case of Berwick-upon-Tweed) and piracy (in the cases of Poole and Haverfordwest).

Most of the counties corporate only covered the borough, but in three cases they extended beyond the borough boundaries to include adjoining areas. York was made a county corporate in 1396, and its jurisdiction was extended in 1449 to cover an area to the west of the city known as the Ainsty. Kingston upon Hull was made a county corporate in 1440, and its jurisdiction was extended in 1447 to cover an adjoining area to the west, which became known as Hullshire. When Coventry was made a county corporate in 1451 its jurisdiction covered several surrounding villages known as the County of the City of Coventry. York and Hull lost their jurisdiction over the rural areas when both were reduced to just cover the borough boundaries under the Municipal Corporation (Boundaries) Act 1836. There were disputes about the effect of the 1836 Act on Coventry, which were resolved in 1842 when the county corporate of Coventry was abolished completely and the city and surrounding villages were placed back under the authority of the Sheriff of Warwickshire.

The Sheriff of the City of London also had a jurisdiction that extended beyond the city boundary, covering the whole of the county of Middlesex. In 1889 the sheriff's jurisdiction was reduced to just cover the city itself, on the creation of the separate positions of Sheriff of the County of London, covering the rest of the new County of London as lay outside the city itself, and Sheriff of Middlesex, covering the reduced area of Middlesex that was left outside the County of London.

Lord-lieutenants began to be appointed in each county from Tudor times onwards. Although counties corporate were legally described as counties, they were not given their own lieutenants, with the exceptions of London and Haverfordwest. Instead, lieutenants were appointed to what was termed the 'county at large', including counties corporate with the adjoining county from which they had been separated. The practice of not appointing separate lieutenants for counties corporate was an informal convention at first, but was subsequently made statutory under the Militia Act 1882.

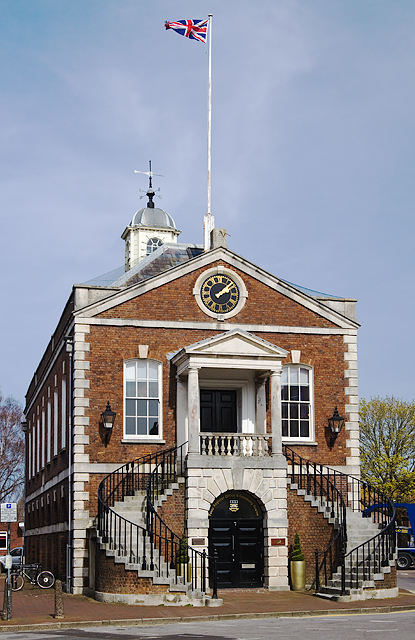
Poole Guildhall, built 1761: Served both as meeting place of the borough council and as the courthouse for the county corporate of Poole

From the 18th century onwards, court cases arising from counties corporate were allowed to be held jointly with the assizes for the neighbouring county.

In 1836 all the counties corporate except London were reformed to become municipal boroughs under the Municipal Corporations Act 1835. Elected county councils were established in 1889 under the Local Government Act 1888. Certain boroughs were considered large enough for their existing corporations to provide county-level local government functions, and so they were given a new status of county borough. The new local government arrangements in 1889 did not directly affect the counties corporate, which were judicial in nature rather than providing local government functions. However, most of the counties corporate also qualified to be made county boroughs. There were only five counties corporate which did not become county boroughs, being Berwick upon Tweed, Lichfield, Poole, Carmarthen and Haverfordwest. Those five became part of the administrative county in which they were situated for local government purposes, but retained their separate judicial functions and right to appoint their own sheriffs. The City of London retained (and as of 2024 still retains) its previous status, including most responsibilities associated with a borough and some normally associated with a county, for example having its own police force and its own education authority.

The assizes, quarter sessions and other courts which had been under the responsibility of a sheriff were all abolished in 1972 under the Courts Act 1971, thus ending the judicial powers associated with being a county corporate. The counties corporate were not explicitly abolished by the 1971 Act, and they retained the right to appoint a sheriff, albeit no longer holding any powers. With the exception of the City of London, the other counties corporate, being a type of municipal borough, were abolished in 1974 under the Local Government Act 1972 which abolished all municipal boroughs. Some of the new bodies created in 1974, including town councils for civil parishes and non-metropolitan district councils, were given the right to continue to appoint a ceremonial sheriff if that town or city had been a county corporate prior to 1974.

=== Ireland ===
In Ireland, eight counties corporate were extant by 1610. Each had its own grand jury, assizes and county gaol, separate from those of the adjoining "county-at-large", even though the relevant city or town might be the county town of the county-at-large, in which case the latter's courthouse and gaol would be considered exclaves of the county-at-large by the terms of Linen Manufacturers Act 1763 (3 Geo. 3. c. 34 (I)). The Courthouses and Gaols Act 1788 (28 Geo. 3. c. 38 (I)) allowed the same courthouse or gaol to be shared by county corporate and county-at-large. (Dublin city and County Dublin, like the City of London and Middlesex, were outside the assize system but similarly separate jurisdictions.) Where an act of Parliament referred to "any county" it was doubtful that this included counties corporate, the latter intent being expressed as "any county, county of a city, or county of a town". The Servants' Wages Act 1542 (33 Hen. 8. c. 3 (I)) and the County Hospitals Act 1765 (5 Geo. 3. c. 20 (I)) were extended to counties corporate by the Servants' Wages Act 1807 (47 Geo. 3 Sess. 1 c. 43) and the County Infirmaries (Ireland) Act 1807 (47 Geo. 3 Sess. 2. c. 50) respectively.

Under the Militia (Ireland) Act 1809 (49 Geo. 3. c. 120), Dublin and Cork cities were separate from their surrounding counties for militia purposes, but the other counties corporate were not. The Militia (Voluntary Enlistment) Act 1875 (38 & 39 Vict. c. 69) separated the militia for Waterford city and Galway town. The Militia Act 1882 (45 & 46 Vict. c. 49) provided separate militia and lieutenancies for Dublin, Cork, and Limerick cities, and separate lieutenancies for Waterford city and Galway town.

Each county corporate contained rural "liberties" outside the city or town's municipal boundary; in six cases these were transferred to the adjacent county-at-large in 1840–2; the exceptions were Galway and Carrickfergus, where the municipal corporation was abolished instead. The extant baronies of Cork and Dublin are coterminous with the territories transferred from the respective cities in 1840, while the North Liberties barony is part of the former county of the city of Limerick, whose south liberties were absorbed by pre-existing baronies. The 1842 report of the Select Committee on Grand Jury Presentments of Ireland found none of the counties corporate except Drogheda derived any advantage from their status, and recommended they be absorbed as baronies of the adjoining county-at-large. The counties corporate were explicitly abolished in 1899 under the terms of the Local Government (Ireland) Act 1898. Cork, Dublin, Limerick and Waterford became county boroughs. Carrickfergus, Drogheda, Galway and Kilkenny became parts of administrative counties. The baronies of Carrickfergus and Galway are coterminous with the former counties corporate.

== List of counties corporate ==
The counties corporate (listed with date of creation where known) were:

=== England ===
- County of the Borough and Town of Berwick upon Tweed (s.6 of the Berwick-on-Tweed Act 1836, except that the Parliamentary constituency was not made a county borough constituency)
- County of the Town of Bristol (1373, city since 1542) (Note: The City of Bristol regained its separate shrievalty and lieutenancy in 1996.)
- County of the City of Canterbury (1461)
- County of the Town of Chester (1506, city since 1541)
- County of the City of Coventry (1451, abolished 1842)
- County of the City of Exeter (1537)
- County of the Town of Gloucester (1483, city since 1541)
- Kingston upon Hull, County of Hullshire (1440, restricted to County of the Town of Kingston upon Hull 1835, city since 1897)
- County of the City of Lichfield (1556)
- County of the City of Lincoln (1409)
- City of London (1132) (Note: The City of London retains its separate shrievalty and lieutenancy.)
- County of the Town of Newcastle upon Tyne (1400, city since 1882)
- County of the City of Norwich (1404)
- County of the Town of Nottingham (1449, city since 1897)
- County of the Town of Poole (1568)
- County of the Town of Southampton (1447, city since 1964)
- County of the City of Worcester (1622)
- County of the City of York (1396)

=== Wales ===
- County of the Town of Carmarthen (1604)
- County of the Town of Haverfordwest (1479)

=== Ireland ===
- County of the Town of Carrickfergus (1569) Carrickfergus gave its name to a "bailiwick" (by 1216) or "county" (by 1276) within the Norman Earldom of Ulster; after the 14th-century Gaelic Resurgence, Norman control was confined to the environs of the town. The town's 1569 charter formally linked its corporation to the eponymous county.
- County of the City of Cork (1608)
- County of the Town of Drogheda (1412)
- County of the City of Dublin (1548)
- County of the Town of Galway (1610)
- County of the City of Kilkenny (1610)
- County of the City of Limerick (1609)
- County of the City of Waterford (1574)
- City and county of Derry (1604–13). The 1604 charter incorporated the city and liberties as the "city and county of Derry". The 1836 report of the commissioners on municipal corporations in Ireland said "the charter does not appear ... to have been further acted upon"; however, in 1609, the commissioners who planned for the Plantation of Ulster held assizes in the "ruined city of Derry", separate from those of County Donegal to the west and County Coleraine to the east, and John Davies called it "this little county". The 1613 charter renamed the city Londonderry and merged it and County Coleraine into the new "County Londonderry", sometimes called "the City and County of Londonderry".

== See also ==
- Free imperial city
- Liberty (division)
