= Municipal Corporations Act 1882 =

Act of the Parliament of the United Kingdom

Municipal Corporations Act 1882 (Note: Section 1.)
- Act of Parliament
- Parliament of the United Kingdom
- Long title: An Act for consolidating, with Amendments, enactments relating to Municipal Corporations in England and Wales.
- Citation: 45 & 46 Vict. c. 50
- Introduced by: J. T. Hibbert MP (Commons)
- Territorial extent: England and Wales (Note: Section 3.)

Dates
- Royal assent: 18 August 1882
- Commencement: 1 January 1883 (Note: Section 4.)
Other legislation
Amends	See § Repealed enactments
Repeals/revokes	See § Repealed enactments
Amended by	Municipal Corporations Act 1883; Summary Jurisdiction Act 1884; Coroners Act 1887; Coroners Act 1892; Municipal Corporations Act 1893; Statute Law Revision Act 1893; Statute Law Revision Act 1898; Municipal Corporations Amendment Act 1906; Costs in Criminal Cases Act 1908; Municipal Corporations Amendment Act 1910; Perjury Act 1911; Forgery Act 1913; Larceny Act 1916; Representation of the People Act 1918; Supreme Court of Judicature (Consolidation) Act 1925; Rating and Valuation Act 1925; Coroners (Amendment) Act 1926; Administration of Justice (Miscellaneous Provisions) Act 1933; Local Government Act 1933; Housing Act 1935; Statute Law Revision Act 1948; Representation of the People Act 1948; Representation of the People Act 1949; Justices of the Peace Act 1949; Magistrates' Courts Act 1952; Highways Act 1959; London Government Act 1963; Police Act 1964; Criminal Law Act 1967; Justices of the Peace Act 1968; Courts Act 1971; Local Government Act 1972; Forgery and Counterfeiting Act 1981; Statute Law (Repeals) Act 1986; Coroners Act 1988; Statute Law (Repeals) Act 1989; Statute Law (Repeals) Act 1993; Access to Justice Act 1999; Courts Act 2003; Charities Act 2006

Status: Amended

History of passage through Parliament

Records of Parliamentary debate relating to the statute from Hansard

Text of statute as originally enacted

Revised text of statute as amended

Text of the Municipal Corporations Act 1882 as in force today (including any amendments) within the United Kingdom, from legislation.gov.uk.

The Municipal Corporations Act 1882 (45 & 46 Vict. c. 50) is an act of the Parliament of the United Kingdom that replaced existing legislation governing municipal boroughs in England and Wales, and gave the corporations powers to make bylaws and to acquire land and buildings. Municipal boroughs continued to be regulated by the act until their abolition in 1974. Parts of the act are still in operation. Sections 190 to 194 were amongst the enactments cited as the Police Acts 1839 to 1893.

== Passage ==
Leave to bring in the Municipal Corporations Bill to the House of Commons was granted to the Parliamentary Secretary to the Local Government Board, J. T. Hibbert MP and the Home Secretary, Sir William Harcourt MP on 13 February 1882. The bill had its first reading in the House of Commons on 13 February 1882, presented by the Parliamentary Secretary to the Local Government Board, J. T. Hibbert MP. The bill had its second reading in the House of Commons on 2 March 1882 and was committed to a committee of the whole house, which met and reported on 28 March 1882, with amendments. The amended bill was re-committed to a committee of the whole house, which met on 2 May 1882, 5 May 1882 and 9 May 1882 and reported on 1 August 1882, with amendments. The amended bill was considered on 1 August 1882, with amendments. The amended bill had its third reading in the House of Commons on 1 August 1882 and passed, without amendments.

The bill had its first reading in the House of Lords on 1 August 1882. The bill had its second reading in the House of Lords on 7 August 1882 and was committed to a committee of the whole house, which met on 10 August 1882 and reported on 11 August 1882, with amendments. The amended bill had its third reading in the House of Lords on 14 August 1882 and passed, with amendments.

The amended bill was considered and agreed to by the House of Commons on 14 August 1882.

The bill was granted royal assent on 18 August 1882.

== Provisions ==
=== Charters and schemes ===
Section 210 of the act allowed inhabitant householders of a town to petition the privy council seeking a charter of incorporation as a borough. Where the petition was successful, a committee of the privy council drew up a "scheme" which described in detail the area of the borough, and the property, powers and duties transferred from existing local authorities such as local boards, sanitary authorities or highway boards, by section 213 of the act. The scheme, together with the charter, described the date of first elections, appointed a returning officer and divided the borough into wards. If one twentieth of the owners or rate payers of the proposed borough objected to the scheme, a local act of parliament had to be passed to bring the borough into existence, by section 213 of the act.

=== Bylaws ===
Section 23 of the act empowered boroughs to make bylaws "as to them seem meet for the good rule and government of the Borough, and for the prevention and suppression of nuisances not already punishable in a summary manner by virtue of any act in force throughout the Borough, and may thereby appoint such fines, not exceeding in any case £5, as they may deem necessary for prevention and suppression of offences against the same". Such bylaws gave considerable power to the borough corporation to exert control over various activities and nuisances. Many bylaws made under the 1882 act are still in force, the powers conferred by them now being exercised by the modern local authorities that replaced the municipal boroughs under local government reorganisation.

=== Buildings and land ===
Section 105 of the act allowed corporations to acquire land and buildings for the administration of the borough. Section 106 of the act provided that money could be borrowed to construct town halls, council houses, police stations, judges' lodgings and other buildings required for the conduct of the corporation's business. Section 108 of the act provided that the maximum term allowed for repayment of such a loan was 30 years, boroughs needing to obtain private acts of parliament to extend the payment period. Section 108 of the act also provided that the corporation could not dispose of land or buildings without the permission of the Local Government Board.

== Subsequent developments ==
The act was described as a Consolidation Act.

Section 257(4) of the act was repealed by section 1(1) of, and group 2 of part VII of schedule 1 to, the Statute Law (Repeals) Act 1986, which came into force on 2 May 1986.

== See also ==
- Municipal Corporations Act
- Boroughs incorporated in England and Wales 1882–1974
