= Grade II* listed buildings in Nuneaton and Bedworth =

There are over 20,000 Grade II* listed buildings in England. This page is a list of these buildings in the district of Nuneaton and Bedworth in Warwickshire.

== Nuneaton and Bedworth ==
Name	Location	Type	Completed (Note: The date given is the date used by Historic England as significant for the initial building or that of an important part in the structure's description.)	Date designated	Grid ref. (Note: The grid reference is based on the British national grid reference system, sometimes known as OSGB36, used by the Ordnance Survey.) Geo-coordinates	Entry number (Note: The "List Entry Number" is a unique number assigned to each listed building and scheduled monument by Historic England.)	Image
Chamberlaine's Almshouses	Bedworth, Nuneaton and Bedworth	Almshouse	1715	10 September 1974	SP3597587073; 52°28′49″N 1°28′18″W	1035003	Chamberlaine's Almshouses More images
Church of All Saints	Bedworth, Nuneaton and Bedworth	Church	C14/C15	1 July 1949	SP3592786919; 52°28′44″N 1°28′21″W	1365052	Church of All Saints More images
Church of St Giles	Exhall, Nuneaton and Bedworth	Church	1988	1 July 1949	SP3404785057; 52°27′45″N 1°30′01″W	1186152	Church of St Giles More images
Church of St James	Bulkington, Nuneaton and Bedworth	Church	1988	1 July 1949	SP3912086763; 52°28′39″N 1°25′32″W	1365054	Church of St James More images
North Lodge, Arbury Hall	Nuneaton and Bedworth	Gate Lodge	Mid/Late 19th century	6 December 1947	SP3338590976; 52°30′56″N 1°30′34″W	1034973	North Lodge, Arbury Hall More images
Park Farmhouse	Arbury Park, Nuneaton and Bedworth	Farmhouse	Late 15th century	11 February 1988	SP3303389804; 52°30′18″N 1°30′53″W	1365048	Upload Photo
Ritz Cinema, Nuneaton	Abbey Street, Nuneaton and Bedworth	Cinema	July 1937	4 September 2008	SP3303389804; 52°31′28″N 1°28′19″W	1392744	Ritz Cinema, Nuneaton More images
South Farmhouse	Arbury Park, Nuneaton and Bedworth	Farmhouse	17th century	6 December 1947	SP3367088526; 52°29′37″N 1°30′20″W	1034972	Upload Photo
The Tea House at SP3395 8956	Arbury Park, Nuneaton and Bedworth	House	C18/Early 19th century	11 February 1988	SP3394689553; 52°30′10″N 1°30′05″W	1299615	Upload Photo
