= Jee's Harts Hill Granite and Brick Company's works railways =

Coordinates: 52.5427°N 1.5111°W

Jee's Harts Hill Granite and Brick Company
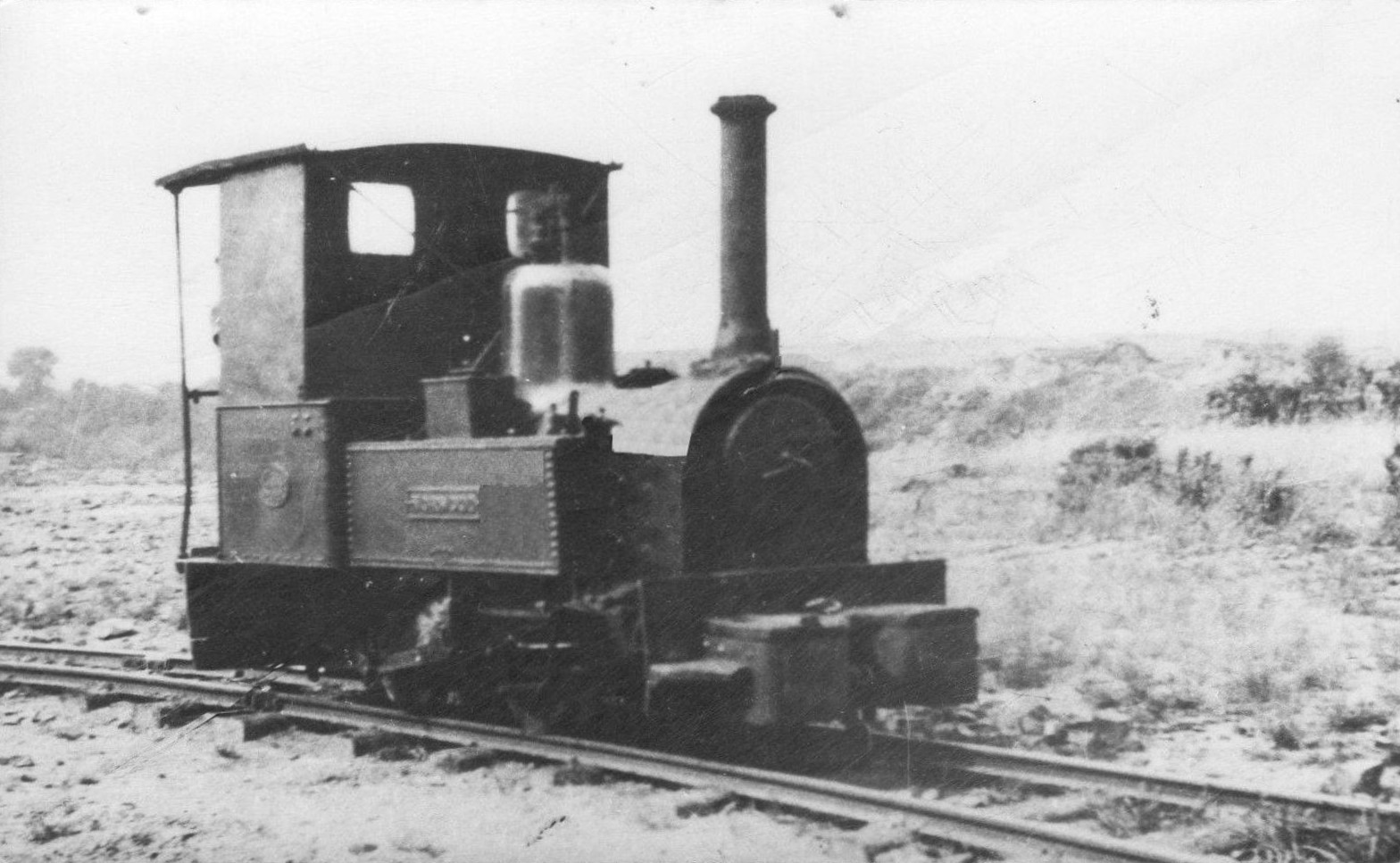
- Hunslet 0-4-0T steam locomotive 'Norwood' built in 1908 for Jee's Hartshill quarries near Nuneaton with a gauge of 2 ft 6 1/2 in (775 mm)

Technical
- Track gauge: 2 ft 6 1/2 in (775 mm) and 4 ft 8 1/2 in (1,435 mm)
Route map
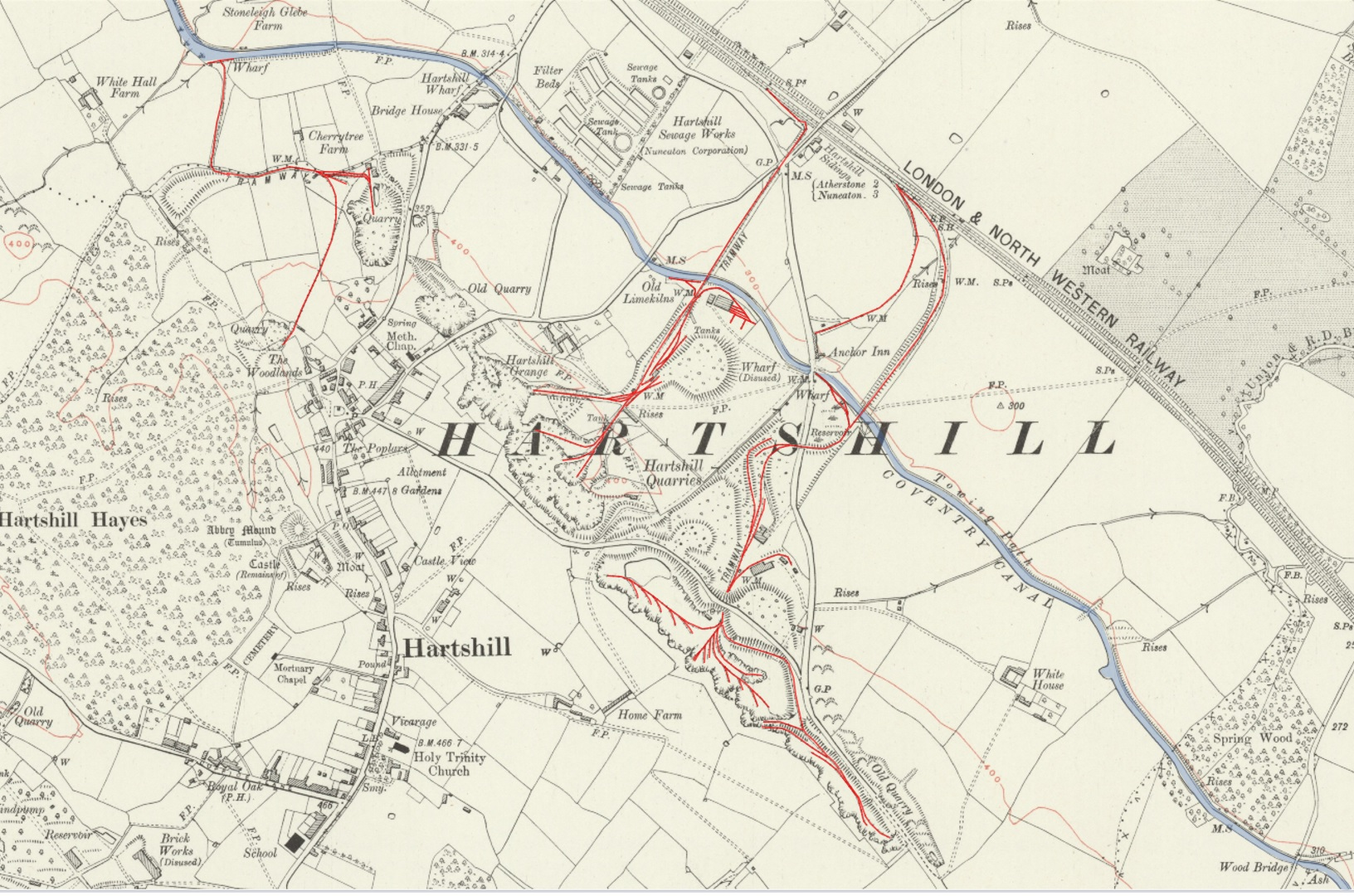
Routes of the tracks, 1913
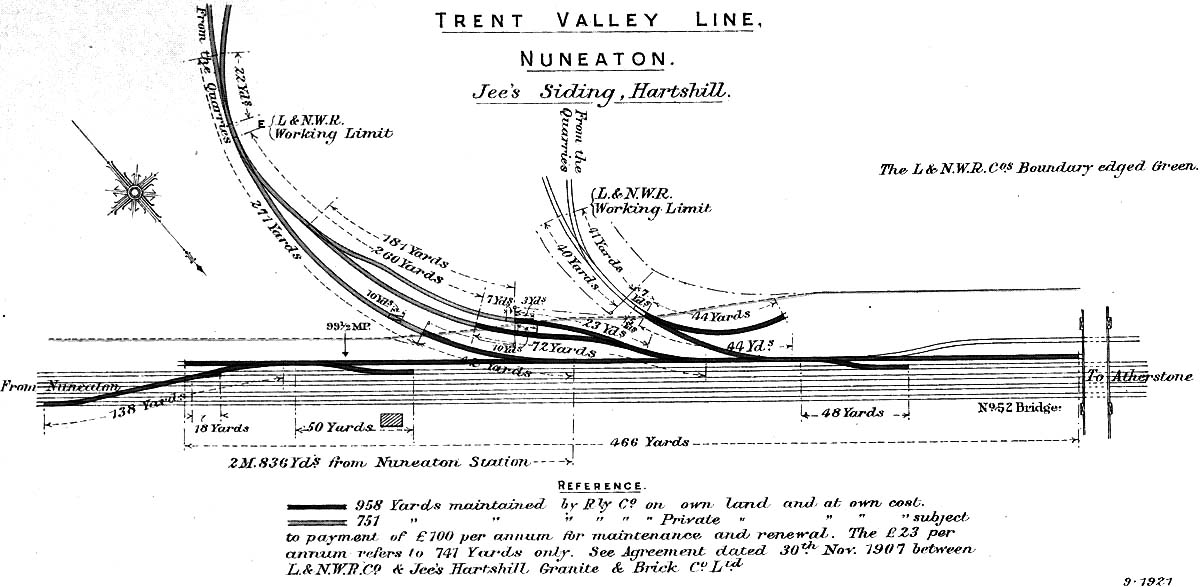
Jee's Siding at Hartshill station of the London and North Western Railway, September 1921

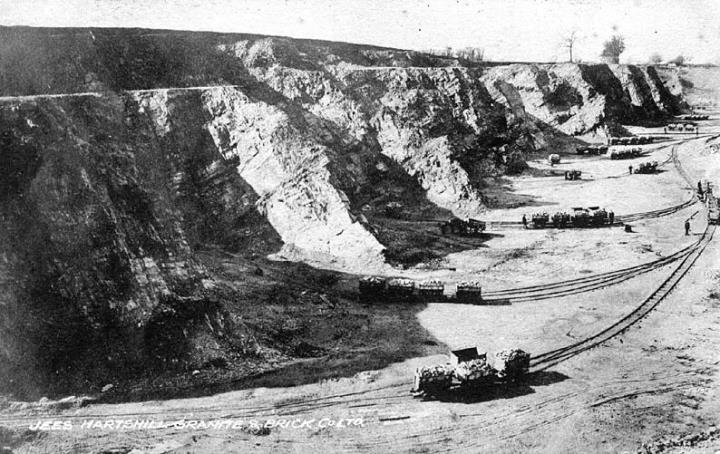
Light railway tracks in Jee's granite quarry, Hartshill, ca 1911

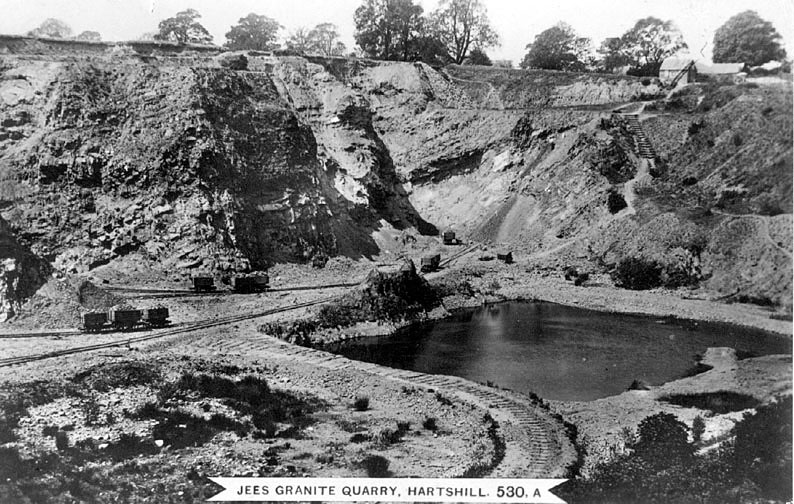
Jee's granite quarry workings and railway, Hartshill, ca 1920

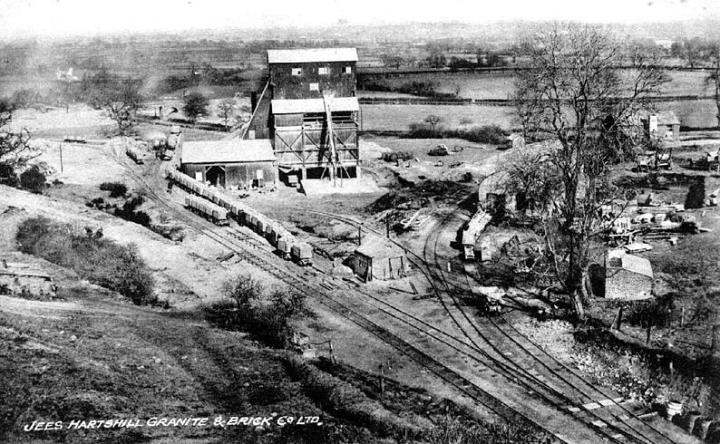
Jee's Granite and Brick Co. Ltd. Hartshill, 1910s

Jee's Harts Hill Granite and Brick Company's works railways consisted of a narrow gauge light railway and a standard gauge works railway at Hartshill station of the London and North Western Railway in England.

== History ==
Richard Gee (died 25 February 1853) founded Jee's Harts Hill Granite and Brick Company Limited in 1822 to quarry granite between Nuneaton and Polesworth and to manufacture building blocks at Chapeltown, on the outskirts of Nuneaton.

A narrow-gauge light railway, with the unusual gauge of 2 ft 6 1/2 in (775 mm), connected the granite quarries to a quay on the nearby Coventry Canal. It was initially operated as a horse-drawn railway, and from 1908 onwards with a Hunslet Engine Company steam locomotive. The light railway was still in operation in 1947 with more than 15 wooden wagons.

A standard gauge siding connected to the London and North Western Railway; it was exactly 100 miles from Euston. Freight wagons were initially leased from the Birmingham Railway Carriage and Wagon Company. In 1899, the company purchased 24 wagons (Nos. 1 to 24) in two lots. The wagons were built with five planks and side doors, painted lime green and lettered diagonally in black from bottom left to top right and with the words "Harts Hill" at the top left and "nr. Atherstone" at the bottom right.

Industrial rail transport ceased in 1954, replaced by road transport.
