= Nicholas Chamberlaine =

The Reverend Nicholas Chamberlaine
- Born: 1632; Whitnash, Warwickshire, England
- Died: 14 July 1715 (aged 83); England
- Spouse(s): Elizabeth Green (1662-1663 approx.)
- Church: Church of England
- Offices held: Vicar, Rector

Nicholas Chamberlaine (1632 – 14 July 1715) was a priest in the Church of England who was known for his charitable donations.

== Biography ==
Nicholas Chamberlaine was born in 1632 in Whitnash, south of Leamington Spa, Warwickshire, England. His family were the Chamberlaines of Astley, Warwickshire. In 1662 he was appointed vicar of Leek Wootton near Warwick and he married Elizabeth Green, but she died afterwards. In February 1664 he moved to Bedworth to become the rector. He remained rector for 51 years until his death, and he helped to establish stability in the area after the English Civil War. Chamberlaine bought land in Bedworth and became the parish squire. He died 14 July 1715.

== Legacy ==
Chamberlaine's will provided for a local school for boys and a school for girls in the same building, for local almshouses for poor people from the Church of England, for apprenticeships for poor children, and for a number of other provisions. In Bedworth the Nicholas Chamberlaine Almshouses and Nicholas Chamberlaine School are named after him.
