= Thomas Larkins Walker =

Scottish architect

Thomas Larkins Walker (c.1811–1860) was a Scottish architect.

== Life ==
Baptised on 20 May 1811 in Dysart, Fifeshire, the son of Adam Walker, he was a pupil of Augustus Charles Pugin, and an executor of his will. In practice initially with Benjamin Ferrey 1833–8, he resided at Nuneaton, and then at Leicester was in practice with Robert Johnson Goodacure to 1856. Emigrating to China, he died in Hong Kong on 10 October 1860.

== Works ==
=== Designs ===
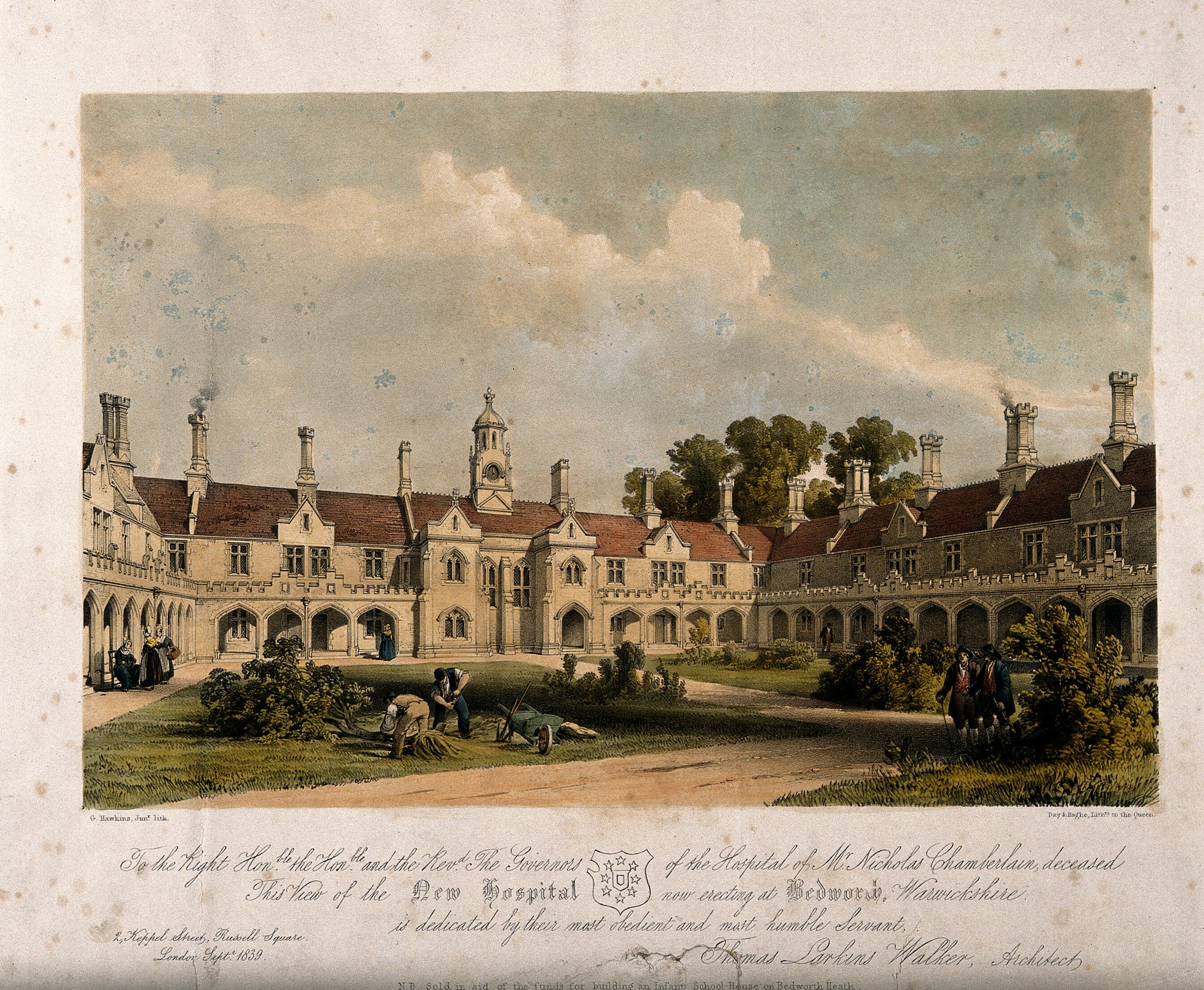
Courtyard view of the New hospital (almshouses) and grounds, Bedworth (1839), design by Thomas Larkins Walker

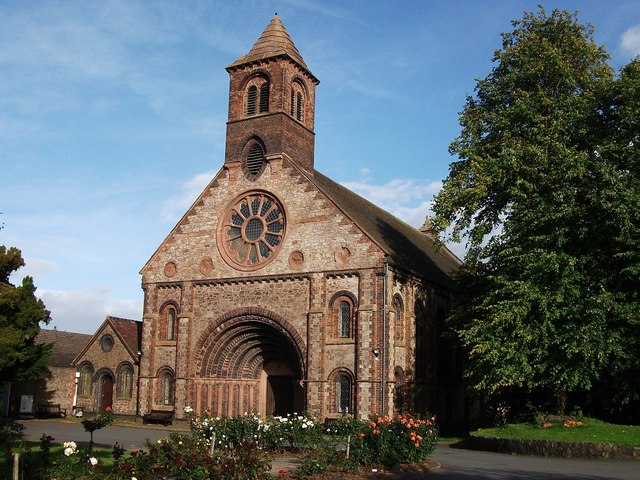
Church of the Holy Trinity, Hartshill

Walker's designs included:

- 1838–9, All Saints' Church, Spicer Street, Mile End;
- 1839, Camphill House, Warwickshire, for J. Craddock;
- 1839–40, church at Attleborough, Nuneaton, for Dudley Ryder, 1st Earl of Harrowby;
- 1840–2, St. Philip's Church, Mount Street, Bethnal Green;
- 1841, Nicholas Chamberlaine Almshouses at Bedworth, Warwickshire;
- 1842, Hartshill church, Warwickshire.

He also restored St Mary's Church, Ilkeston in Derbyshire.

=== Writings ===
Walker published illustrated architectural works in the style of Augustus Pugin:

- Vicar's Close Wells, 1836.
- Manor House and Church at Great Chalfield, Wilts, 1837.
- Manor House of South Wraxhall, Wilts, and Church of St. Peter at Biddlestone, 1838.

These volumes are continuations of Pugin's Examples of Gothic Architecture, and the plates in the first are by Augustus Welby Northmore Pugin.

- The Church of Stoke Golding, Leicestershire, 1844, for John Weale's "Quarterly Papers on Architecture".

He also edited Christopher Davy's Architectural Precedents, 1841, in which he included an article describing his almshouses at Bedworth.

== Notes ==
Attribution

New Brunswick
