= Arrowslit =

Narrow vertical aperture in a fortification

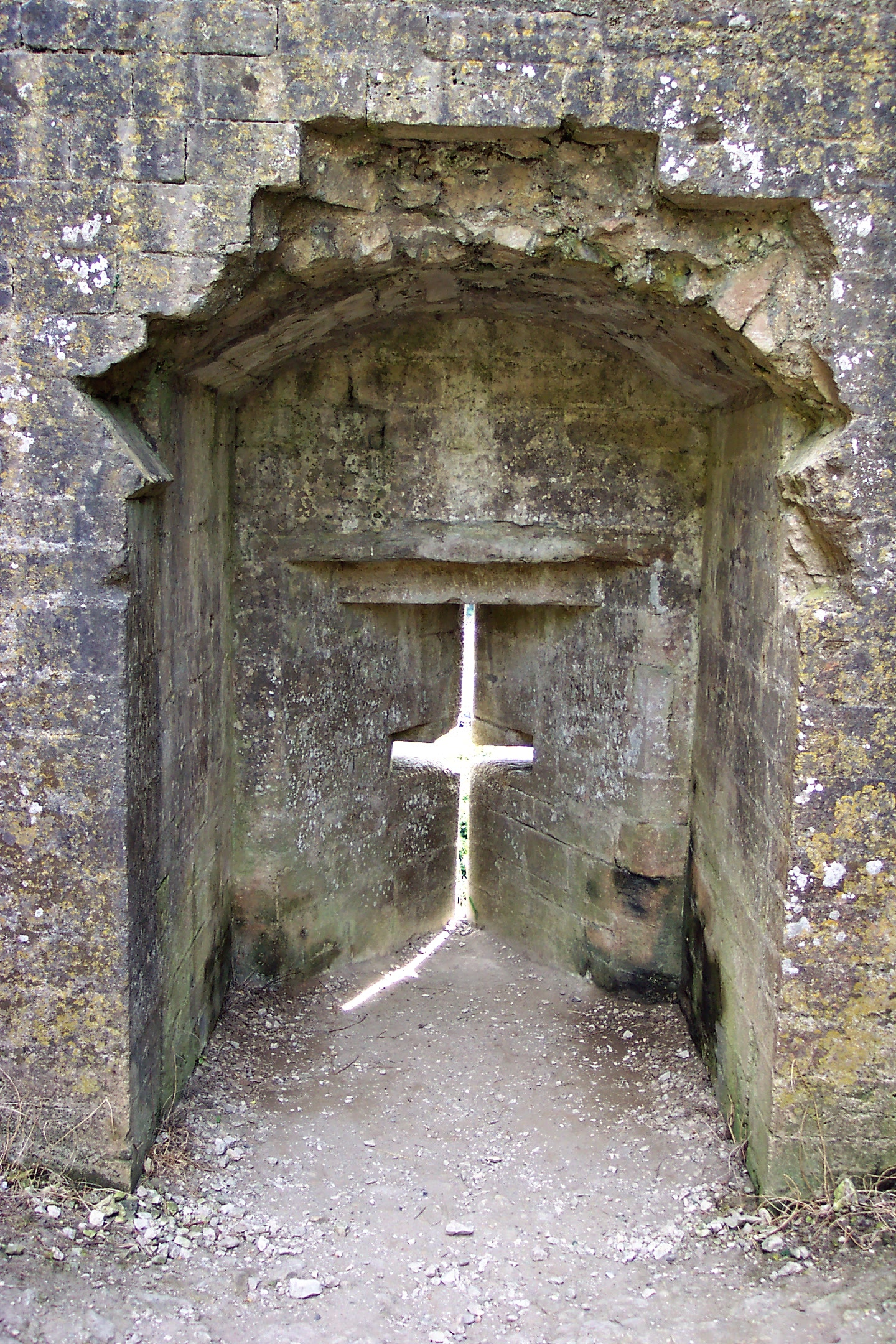
Inside of an arrowslit, where an archer would stand, at Corfe Castle.

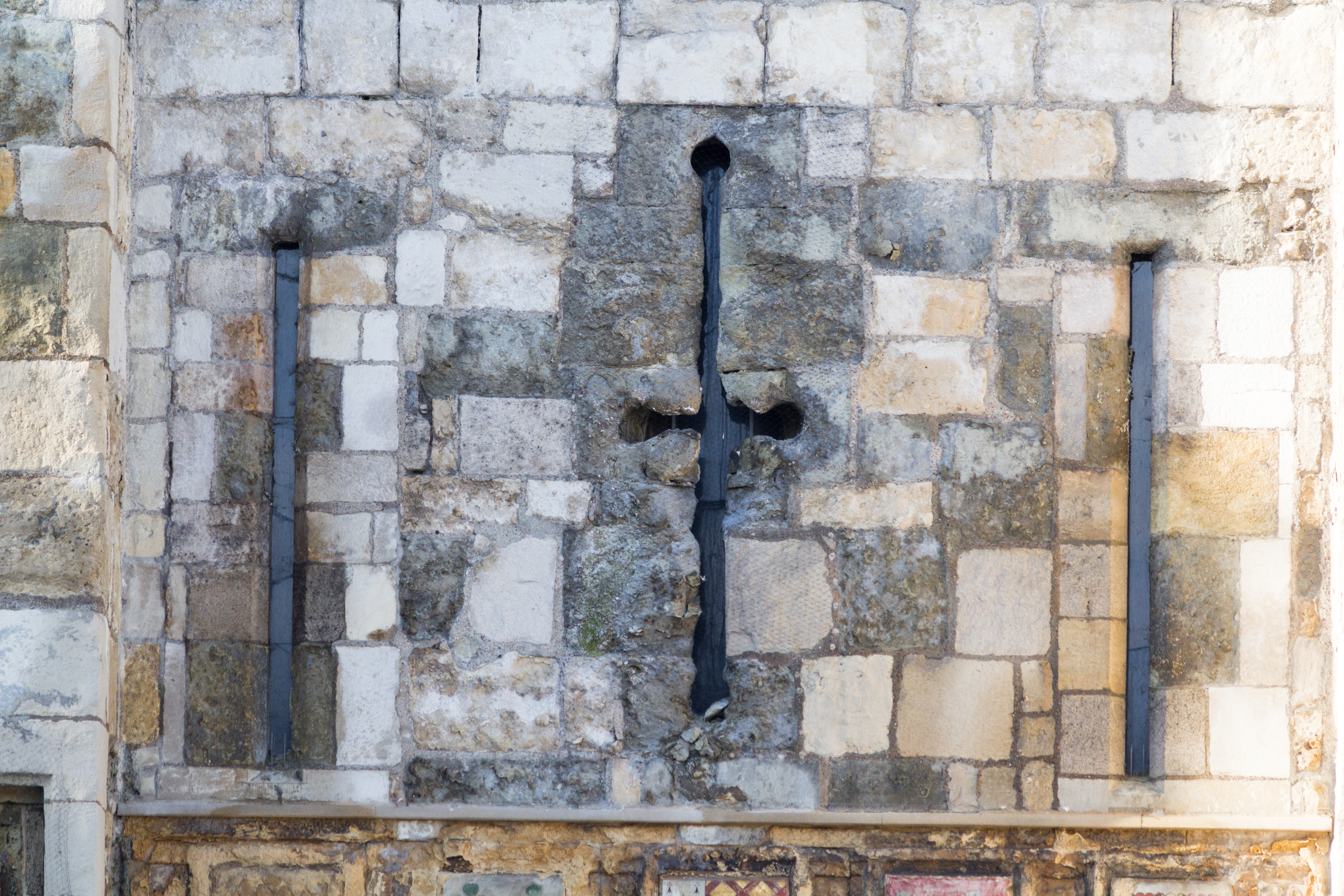
Exterior view of arrowslits in the Bargate gatehouse in Southampton

An arrowslit (often also referred to as an arrow loop, loophole or loop hole, and sometimes a balistraria) is a narrow vertical aperture in a fortification through which an archer can launch arrows or a crossbowman can launch bolts.

The interior walls behind an arrow loop are often cut away at an oblique angle so that the archer has a wide field of view and field of fire. Arrow slits come in a variety of forms. A common one is the cross, accommodating the use of both the longbow and the crossbow. The narrow vertical aperture permits the archer large degrees of freedom to vary the elevation and direction of their bowshot but makes it difficult for attackers to harm the archer since there is only a small target at which to aim.

Balistraria, plural balistrariae (from balister, crossbowman), can often be found in the curtain walls of medieval battlements beneath the crenellations.

== History ==
The invention of the arrowslit is attributed to Archimedes during the siege of Syracuse in 214–212 BC (although archaeological evidence supports their existence in Egyptian Middle Kingdom forts around 1860 BC). Slits "of the height of a man and about a palm's width on the outside" allowed defenders to shoot bows and scorpions (an ancient siege engine) from within the city walls. Although used in late Greek and Roman defences, arrowslits were not present in early Norman castles. They are reintroduced to military architecture only towards the end of the 12th century, with the castles of Dover and Framlingham in England, and Richard the Lionheart's Château Gaillard in France. In these early examples, arrowslits were positioned to protect sections of the castle wall, rather than all sides of the castle. In the 13th century, it became common for arrowslits to be placed all around a castle's defences.

Elements of fortification such as arrowslits became associated with high social standing and authority. As such, damaging them could be significant as an aspect of slighting.

The successor of arrowslits after the advent of gunpowder was the loophole for firearms.

== Design ==
An arrowslit at Cité de Carcassonne. The wall thickness is reduced to 0.7 m to accommodate the niche and the embrasure widens at an angle of 35°.

In its simplest form, an arrowslit was a narrow vertical opening; however, the different weapons used by defenders sometimes dictated the form of arrowslits. For example, openings for longbowmen were usually tall and high to allow the user to shoot standing up and make use of the 6 ft (1.8 m) bow, while those for crossbowmen were usually lower down as it was easier for the user to shoot whilst kneeling to support the weight of the weapon. It was common for arrowslits to widen to a triangle at the bottom, called a fishtail, to allow defenders a clearer view of the base of the wall. Immediately behind the slit there was a recess called an embrasure; this allowed a defender to get close to the slit without being too cramped. The width of the slit dictated the field of fire, but the field of vision could be enhanced by the addition of horizontal openings; they allowed defenders to view the target before it entered range.

Usually, the horizontal slits were level, which created a cross shape, but less common was to have the slits off-set (called displaced traverse slots) as demonstrated in the remains of White Castle in Wales. This has been characterised as an advance in design as it provided attackers with a smaller target; however, it has also been suggested that it was to allow the defenders of White Castle to keep attackers in their sights for longer because of the steep moat surrounding the castle.

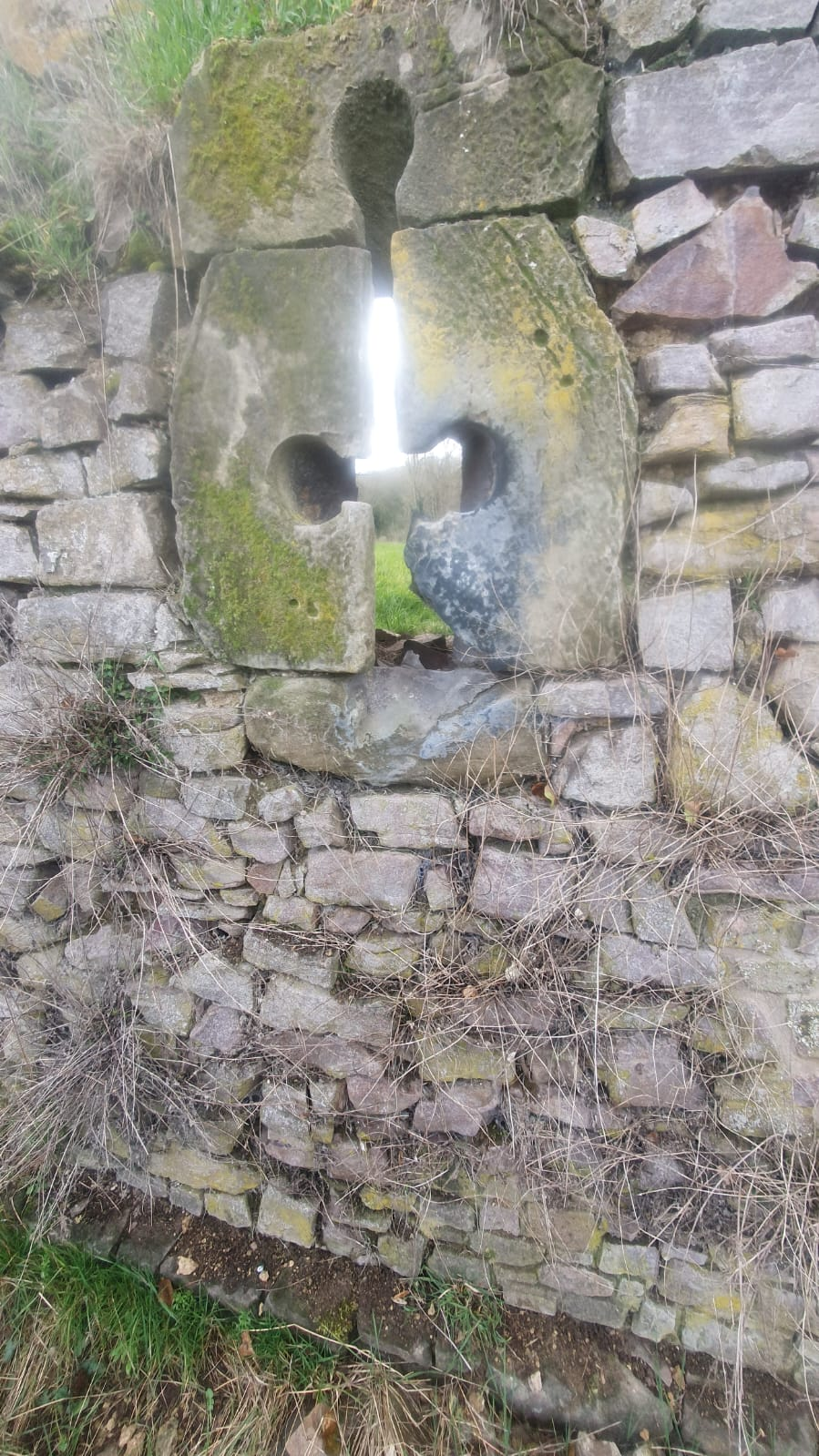
An example of a 14th-century arrowslit at Hartshill Castle

When an embrasure linked to more than one arrowslit (in the case of Dover Castle, defenders from three embrasures can shoot through the same arrowslit) it is called a "multiple arrowslit". Some arrowslits, such as those at Corfe Castle, had lockers nearby to store spare arrows and bolts; these were usually located on the right hand side of the slit for ease of access and to allow a rapid rate of fire.

== See also ==
- Loophole (firearm), a protected small opening to discharge a firearm.
- Loophole

== Bibliography ==
- De Lange, William (2021). An Encyclopedia of Japanese Castles. Toyo Press. ISBN 978-9492722300.
- Friar, Stephen (2003), The Sutton Companion to Castles, Stroud: Sutton Publishing, ISBN 978-0-7509-3994-2
- Jones, Peter; Renn, Derek (1982), "The military effectiveness of Arrow Loops: Some experiments at White Castle", Château Gaillard: Études de castellologie médiévale, IX–X, Centre de Recherches Archéologiques Médiévales: 445–456
- Liddiard, Robert (2005), Castles in Context: Power, Symbolism and Landscape, 1066 to 1500, Macclesfield: Windgather Press, ISBN 9780954557522
- Wheatley, Abigail (2004), The Idea of the Castle in Medieval England, York: York Medieval Press
