= Ritz Cinema, Nuneaton =

Cinema in Nuneaton, Warwickshire, England

The Ritz
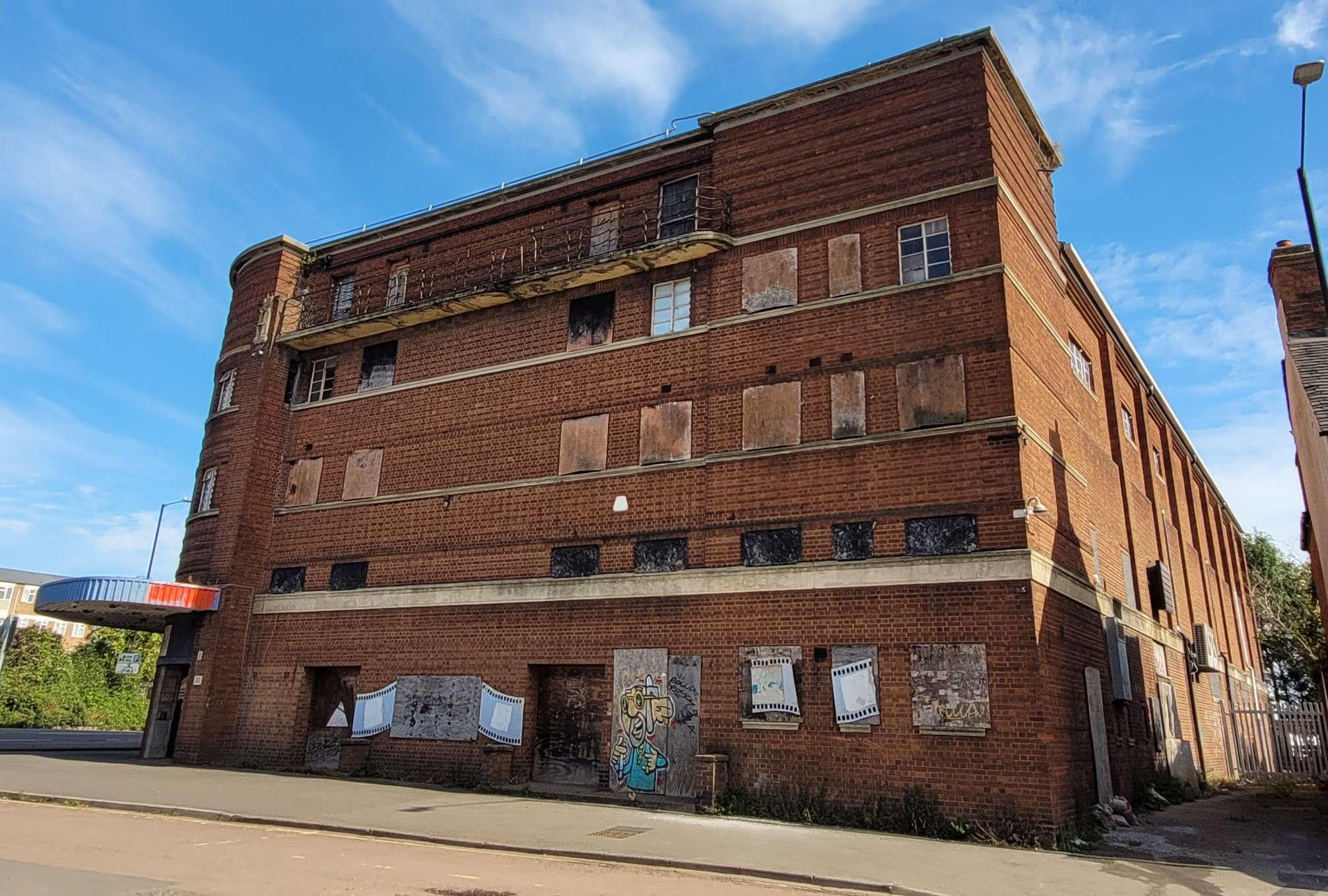
- The Ritz in 2024

General information
- Architectural style: Art-Deco; Neo Egyptian; Chinoiserie
- Classification: Grade II*
- Address: 122 Abbey Street
- Town or city: Nuneaton, Warwickshire
- Country: England
- Coordinates: 52.524677°N 1.471517°W
- Opened: July 23, 1937
- Closed: 2007

Design and construction
- Architect(s): Verity and Beverley
- Main contractor: G. E. & W. Wincott

Listed Building – Grade II
- Official name: Ritz Cinema
- Designated: 4 September 2008
- Reference no.: 1392744

The Ritz Cinema (better known as The Ritz) is a Grade-II listed art-deco former cinema located on Abbey Street, Nuneaton. It was opened on 23 July 1937, originally for the Union Cinemas circuit, however, in October of the same year, ABC Cinemas would take over the building. The Ritz would stop showing films in 1984. After being used as a cinema, the building would be converted to a bingo hall, and trade as such until its closure.

== History ==
The Ritz was constructed by cinema architects Verity and Beverley for Union Cinemas. It was founded by David Bernhard and his son, C.F. Bernhard. It opened to the public for the first time on 23 July 1937. It was opened by Nuneaton Mayor and Councillor, T.L. Liggins, who was accompanied by the Mayoress, with nearly 2,000 people inside for the opening ceremony. Melody for Two and Mysterious Crossing were shown on the opening night. As well as this, a live show took place on-stage.

Around the same time of The Ritz being constructed, plans were unveiled about a Danilo Cinema potentially being built in Nuneaton, but this never went ahead because seven cinemas already existed in town. Mortimer Dent, of the Danilo Cinema Company, was still interested in setting up near to Nuneaton and ultimately chose Hinckley. The proposed Nuneaton location would have marked the first of his Danilo cinemas.

The general contractors for the building, G. E. & W. Wincott of Nuneaton, were also the contractors of the Danilo Cinema in Hinckley. Reports state that there was 'a race' to see which of the two cinemas would open first. The Ritz won and opened just three days before the Danilo.

It closed as a Gala Bingo hall in 2007. The closure was blamed on the smoking ban. A year later in 2008, it received its Grade II listed protection.

== Closure ==
Whilst it remained closed from 2008, until 2019 where it was finally purchased, various community projects were launched and many parties shown interest in trying to get the building back in to use once again.

The Ritz was placed back on the market back in June 2008 at a lower asking price of £1.2 million, down from its original £1.5 million price tag, due to "abortive negotiations" with an interested party. Around the same time, rumours were circulating that fashion retailer Primark were taking on the site, but these were denied by chartered surveyors Wright Silverwood.

In November 2009, it was sold privately to a 'mystery' investor, who was believed to be from Nuneaton, but the investor was not named. It failed to meet the £320,000 reserve price at auction.

In February 2010, a year later, "serious interest" was shown in the building by two national leisure operators and a national retailer, neither of which were bingo operators, as a covenant was made with Gala Bingo whilst they had the building which meant it could not be used as a bingo hall again after its closure.

In July 2013, flyposters were replaced with cinema-related art when local Nuneaton-based group, Art Alert, visited the venue as part of their 'Friends of the Ritz' project. In 2013, film director Ken Loach who was born in Nuneaton, backed a £5m plan for the venue to be used again, though nothing came of the plans.

On 27 February 2019, the building was sold for £339,500.

== Compton organ ==
The Ritz had a 'Compton organ' that was in an orchestra pit, which was played by organist Ken Stroud. The organ remains in use at a church in Essex.
