= Danilo Cinema, Hinckley =

Cinema in Hinckley, Leicestershire, England

The Danilo
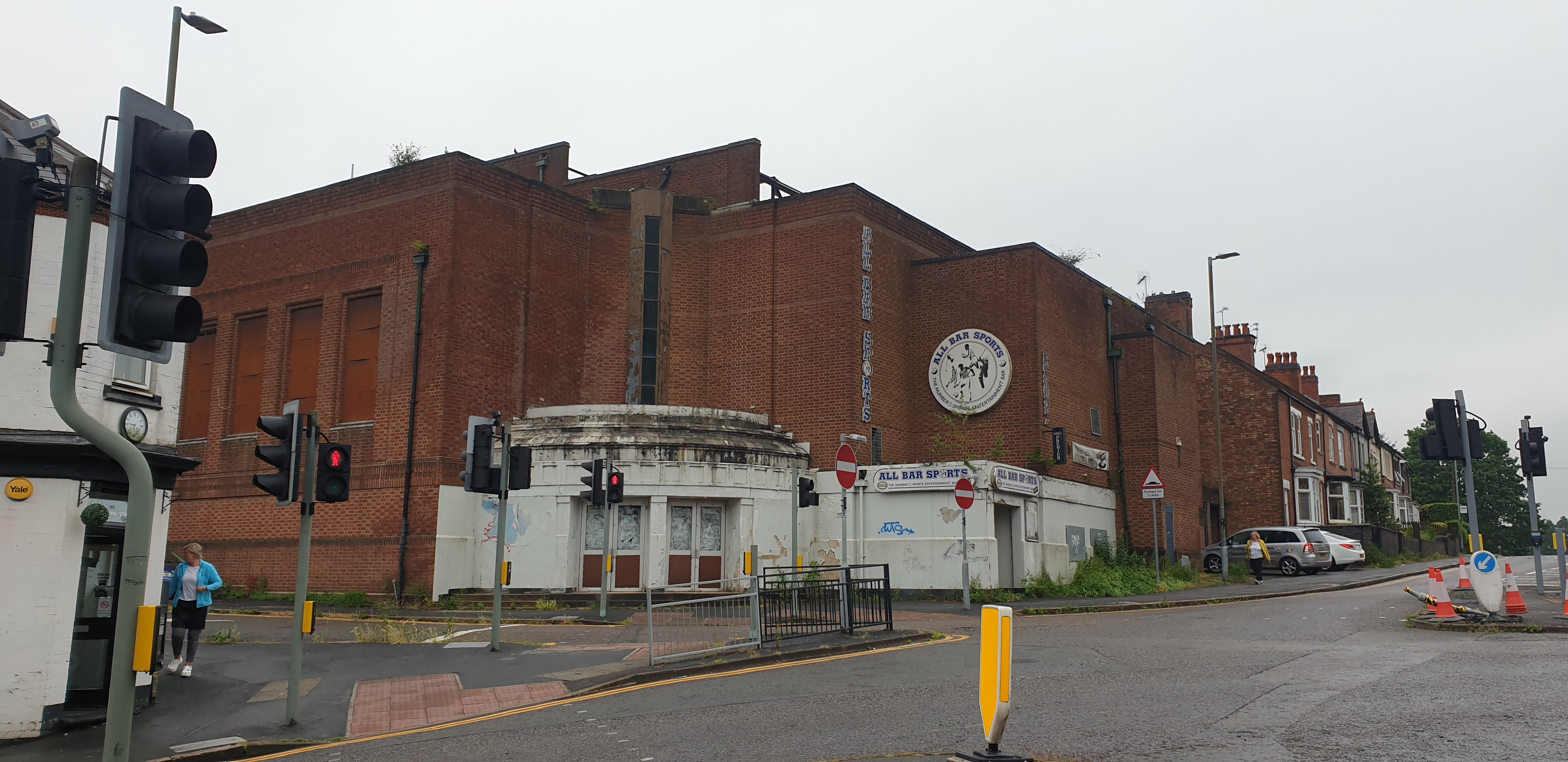
- The Danilo in 2023

General information
- Architectural style: Art-Deco
- Address: Trinity Lane
- Town or city: Hinckley, Leicestershire
- Country: England
- Coordinates: 52.5441333°N 1.3741863°W
- Opened: July 26, 1937
- Closed: 2004

Design and construction
- Architect(s): Ernest S. Roberts
- Main contractor: G. E. & W. Wincott

The Danilo Cinema (also known as The Cannon, The Classic, The Essoldo and All Bar Sports) is an Art-Deco former cinema and sports bar located on Trinity Lane in Hinckley. It marked one of three cinemas in the town, with the other two being The Odeon on The Borough, and The Regent on Lancaster Road.

== History ==
=== Danilo (1936–1970) ===
The Danilo Cinema was built in 1936 on a former hosiery factory site on Trinity Lane, near Hollycroft, by Birmingham-based cinema architect Ernest S. Roberts. It formed part of Mortimer Dent's "Danilo" cinema chain, which had other sites across the country in Brierley Hill, Redditch, Cannock, Longbridge, Stoke-on-Trent, and Stourbridge. The main contractors behind its construction were G. E. & W. Wincott, who were simultaneously building The Ritz Cinema in Nuneaton. During this time, a 'race' was held to see which of the two would open first. The Ritz 'won' and was officially opened first on 23 July 1937.

The Danilo subsequently opened its doors on 26 July 1937, with a grand opening. On the day, it was declared open by Australian-born British stage and screen actress Judy Kelly, alongside Mr. Knowles Edge, the son of Bosworth's Member of Parliament Sir William Edge, as Sir William was indisposed on the day.

=== Essoldo and Classic (1970–1973) ===
In 1970, The Danilo was taken on under new ownership for the first time since opening 34 years prior, where it was relaunched as The Essoldo. It operated as The Esslodo until 1972. Some time in 1973, it was bought by Classic Cinemas, where it was renamed again.

== Closure ==
=== Cannon (August 1973–1993) ===
In August 1973, The Danilo was re-opened as a Cannon Cinema after having renovation works carried out to become a three-screen cinema. 21 years later, in May 1993, while trading under "The Cannon" name, it permanently closed, leaving the town without a functioning cinema. One year later, a campaign to re-open the building was started, though it ultimately failed.

=== All Bar Sports (1998–2004) ===
In 1998, it would finally re-open once again, with a new use, this time trading as an independent sports bar named All Bar Sports. This would mark the last time it was used, as it would permanently close in 2004, never to be used again since.

== Apartment plans (2016–present) ==
In June 2016, developers from The Space Studio, acting on behalf of then-owners APV Leisure Limited put forward a planning proposal to demolish the entire building in its derelict state and build a new development on the land, which would have consisted of ground floor retail space, 29 flats, and 18 car parking spaces. These plans were later put on hold, at the advice of council planning officers, and were met with negative reception from locals, who launched yet another petition. The application was not proceeded with.

In April 2023, The Danilo was purchased by an Oadby-based real estate firm for £350,000. Eight months later, new plans were registered showing that they want to transform the building into 36 one-bedroom apartments over four floors, with 17 car parking spaces, and 36 cycle storage spaces.
