= Hartshill Hayes Country Park =

Country park in Warwickshire, England

Coordinates: 52.546623°N 1.526851°W

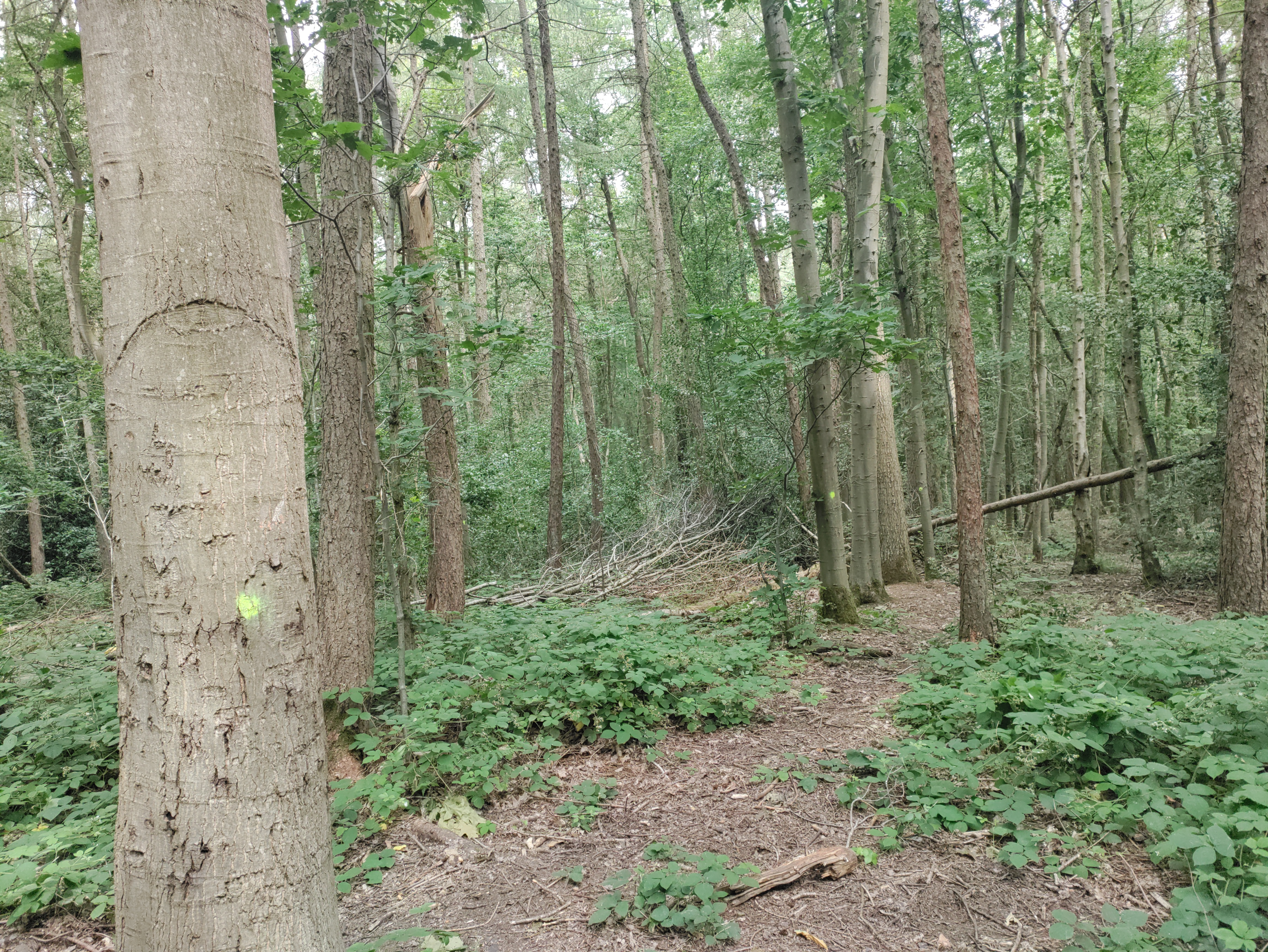
Trees in the country park

Hartshill Hayes Country Park is a country park located immediately west of the village of Hartshill in northern Warwickshire, England in between the towns of Nuneaton and Atherstone. The park covers 137 acres (55 ha) of woodland, and is run by Warwickshire County Council. The park is traversed by footpaths. It is on a hilltop location, and views can be enjoyed over the surrounding countryside.

Within the park is a Memorial for Road Traffic Victims in Warwickshire.
