= Oldbury, Warwickshire =

Coordinates: 52.548133°N 1.5395940°W

Oldbury
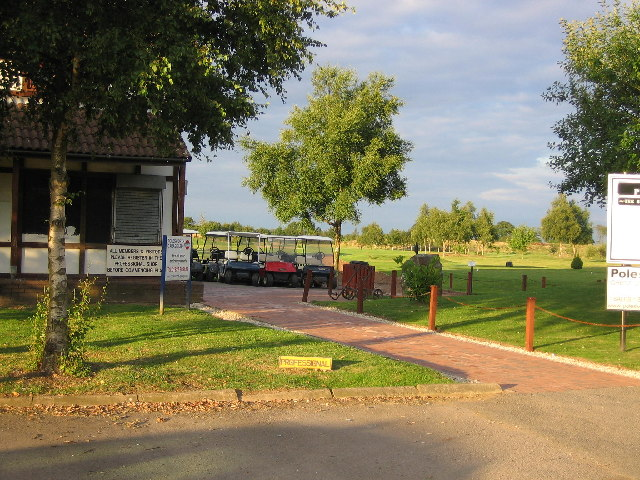
- Purley Chase Golf Course, in the former parish

- Location within Warwickshire
- Civil parish: Hartshill
- District: North Warwickshire
- Shire county: Warwickshire
- Region: West Midlands
- Country: England
- Sovereign state: United Kingdom
- Police: Warwickshire
- Fire: Warwickshire
- Ambulance: West Midlands

Oldbury is a hamlet and former civil parish about 2 miles from Atherstone, now in the parish of Hartshill, in the North Warwickshire district, in the county of Warwickshire, England. In 1961 the parish had a population of 82.

== History ==
The name "Oldbury" means 'Old fortification' referring to the remains of an Iron Age hill fort just north of the hamlet. In 1866 Oldbury became a civil parish, on 1 April 1986 the parish was abolished and merged with Hartshill, Ansley and Mancetter.
