= Hartshill Castle =

Ruined castle in Warwickshire, England

Hartsthill Castle
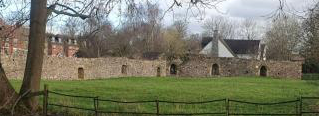
- South-western curtain wall as seen from the manor house in 2023

Site information
- Owner: Private
- Open to the public: No
- Condition: Ruins

Location
- Location within Warwickshire
- Location within Warwickshire
- Coordinates: 52.5413°N 1.52066°W

Site history
- Built: 1125 (motte and bailey); 1330 (stone castle); 1560 (manor house)
- Built by: Hugh de Hardreshull (motte and bailey); John de Hadreshull (stone castle); Michael and Edmund Parker (manor house)
- In use: Until c. 1560 (castle); Until 1950s (manor house)
- Materials: Stone, timber and wattle and daub

Hartshill Castle is a ruined castle in the village of Hartshill on the outskirts of Nuneaton, Warwickshire (grid reference SP325942). It is on Historic England's Heritage at Risk Register due to erosion, structural problems and vandalism; most notably when the castle was damaged by vandals in October 2016.

The site is also privately owned, but can be viewed from a nearby footpath adjacent to the site of the castle.

== Background ==
Stone Age tribes lived on the site of Hartshill Castle around 10,000 BC and they were nomads, not travelling far, but wandering, always returning to this area for flints which they needed for tools and weapons. They found them in the boulder clay at the foot of Hartshill Ridge, near the River Anker. Remains of Stone Age flints and bones of red deer and woolly rhinoceroses have been found in sand and gravel near to the river at Witherly, close to Hartshill Castle.

== History ==
Hugh de Hadreshull built the first motte and bailey castle at Hartshill in 1125 to overlook Atherstone. The palisades were originally made of wood and, on top of the motte, was a wooden tower which was home to the Lord of the manor and his family, as well as being a look-out post. During the reign of King John (1199–1216), William de Hadreshull repaired the timber castle.

By the late 13th century, Hartshill Castle was owned by Robert de Hartshill, and after he was killed at the Battle of Evesham on 4 August 1265, the castle was abandoned and fell into disrepair; during the time Robert owned the castle, the first stone structure, the chapel, was built at Hartshill Castle. John de Hartshill replaced the timber castle with a stone castle during the 14th century, with construction beginning in 1330.

By the early 16th century, the castle had been abandoned, but Sir Anthony Cooke purchased the castle around 1550 and Michael and Edmund Parker had built a manor house out of wattle and daub in the north-eastern corner of the castle in 1560. They leased out the castle and manor house in 1567, and the manor house eventually collapsed sometime after 1927 and was mostly demolished during the 1950s.

The castle was excavated in 2000 without archaeological supervision.

The castle is often damaged by vandals, such as when parts of the curtain walls were damaged and stolen on 2 October 2016.

== Extant remains ==
Part of the moat survives on the western side of the castle, and parts of the ditch survives to the east but has been largely damaged and obscured due to the dumping of waste materials during the 20th century.

Most of the curtain walls of the stone castle built by John de Hartshill also survive, and parts of a tower and the chapel also survive, but the main entrance to the south no longer exists.

Only the chimney stack to the manor house survives. The fireplace is also preserved.

== Gallery ==
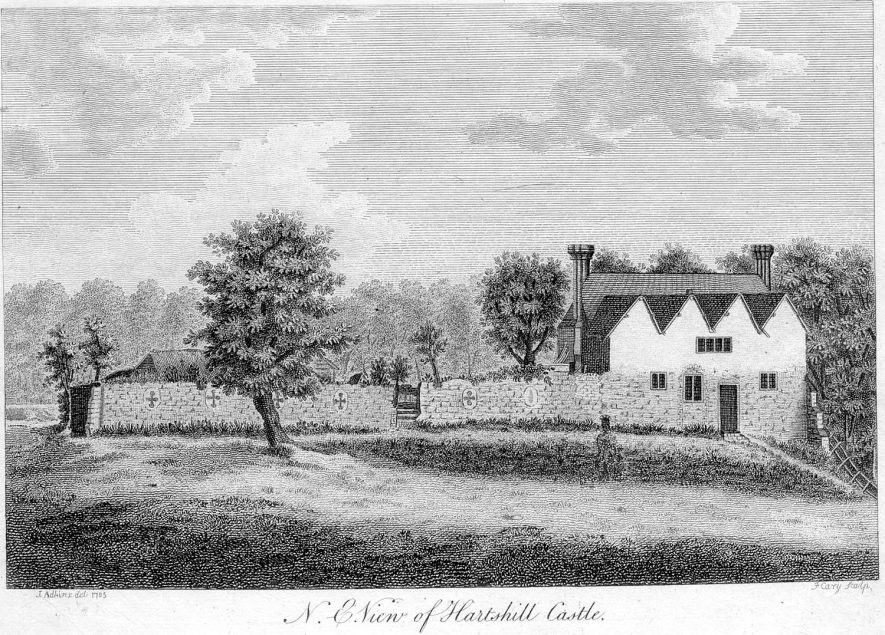
Hartshill Castle in 1785 by J. Adkins and F. Cary

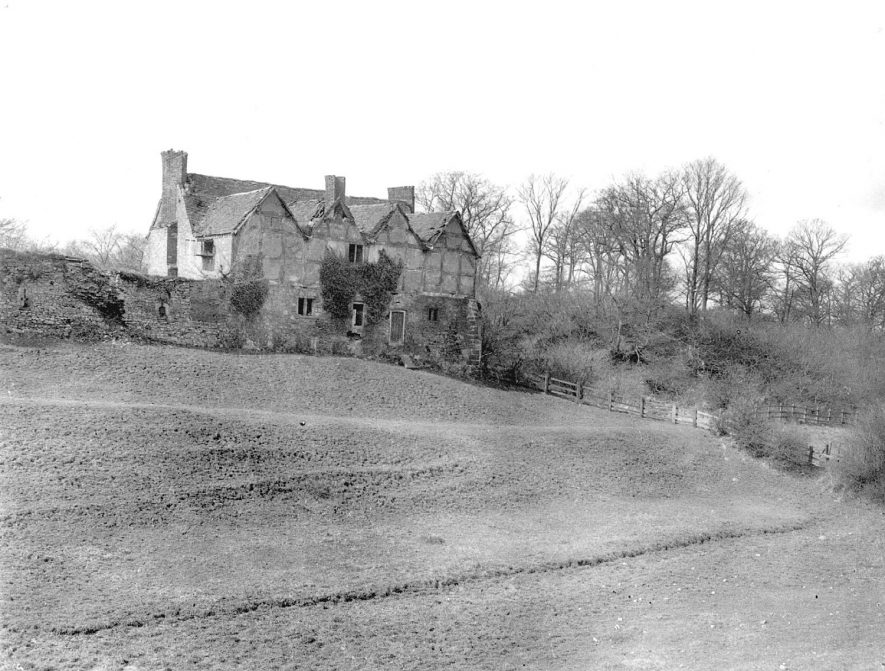
The manor house at Hartshill Castle in 1927

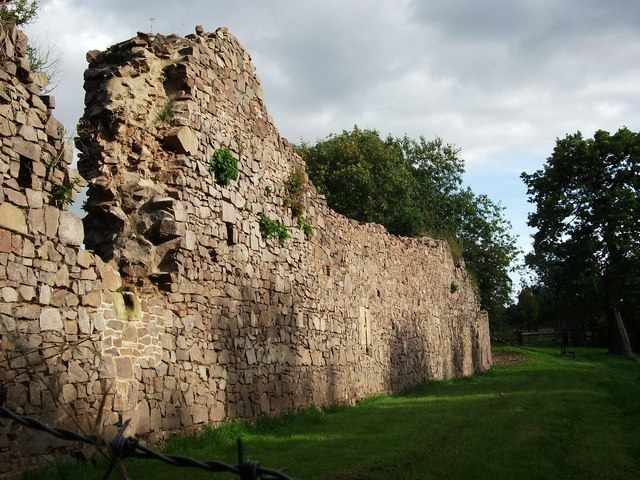
The western curtain wall in 2010

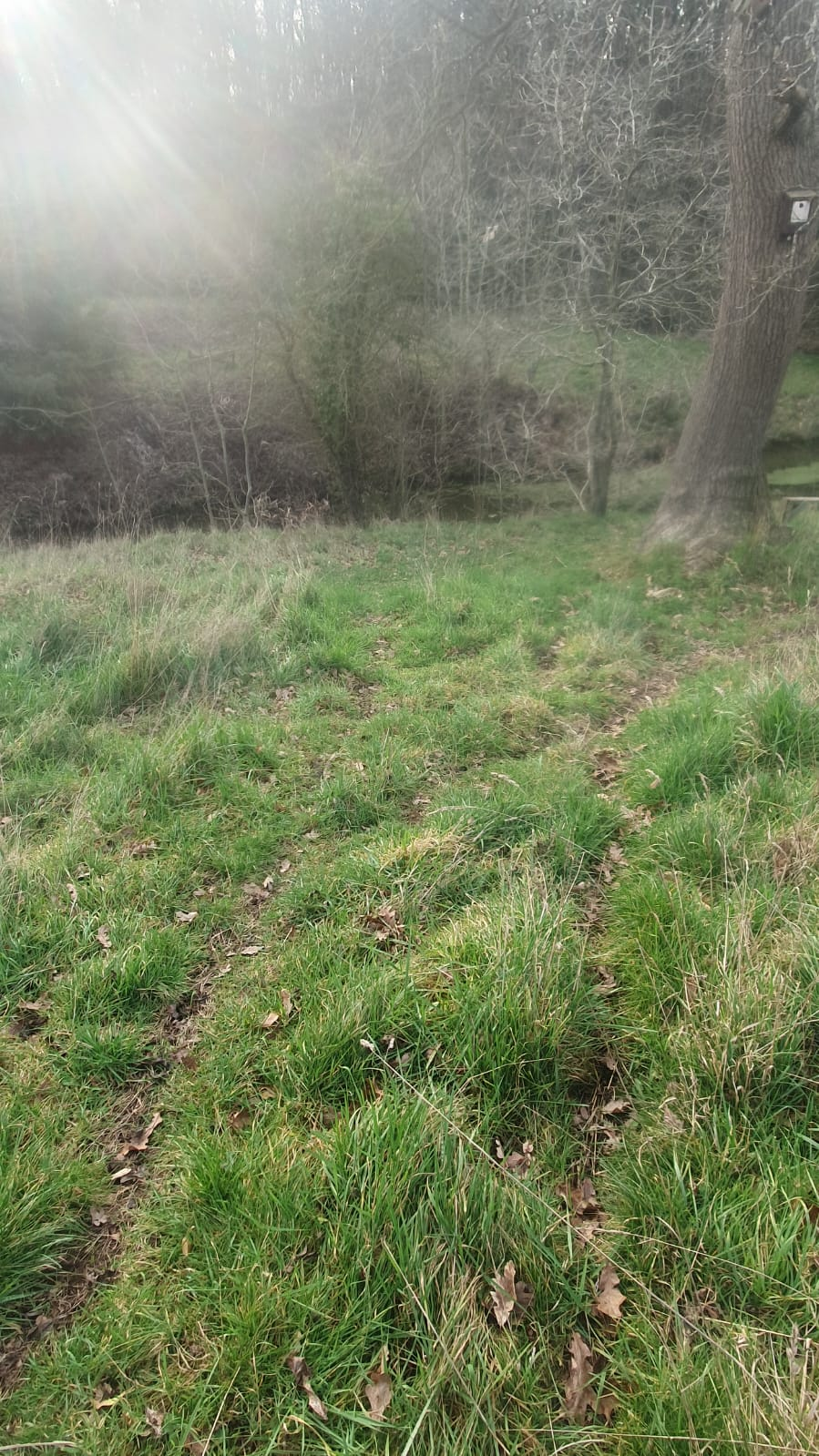
12th century moat, on the western side in 2023

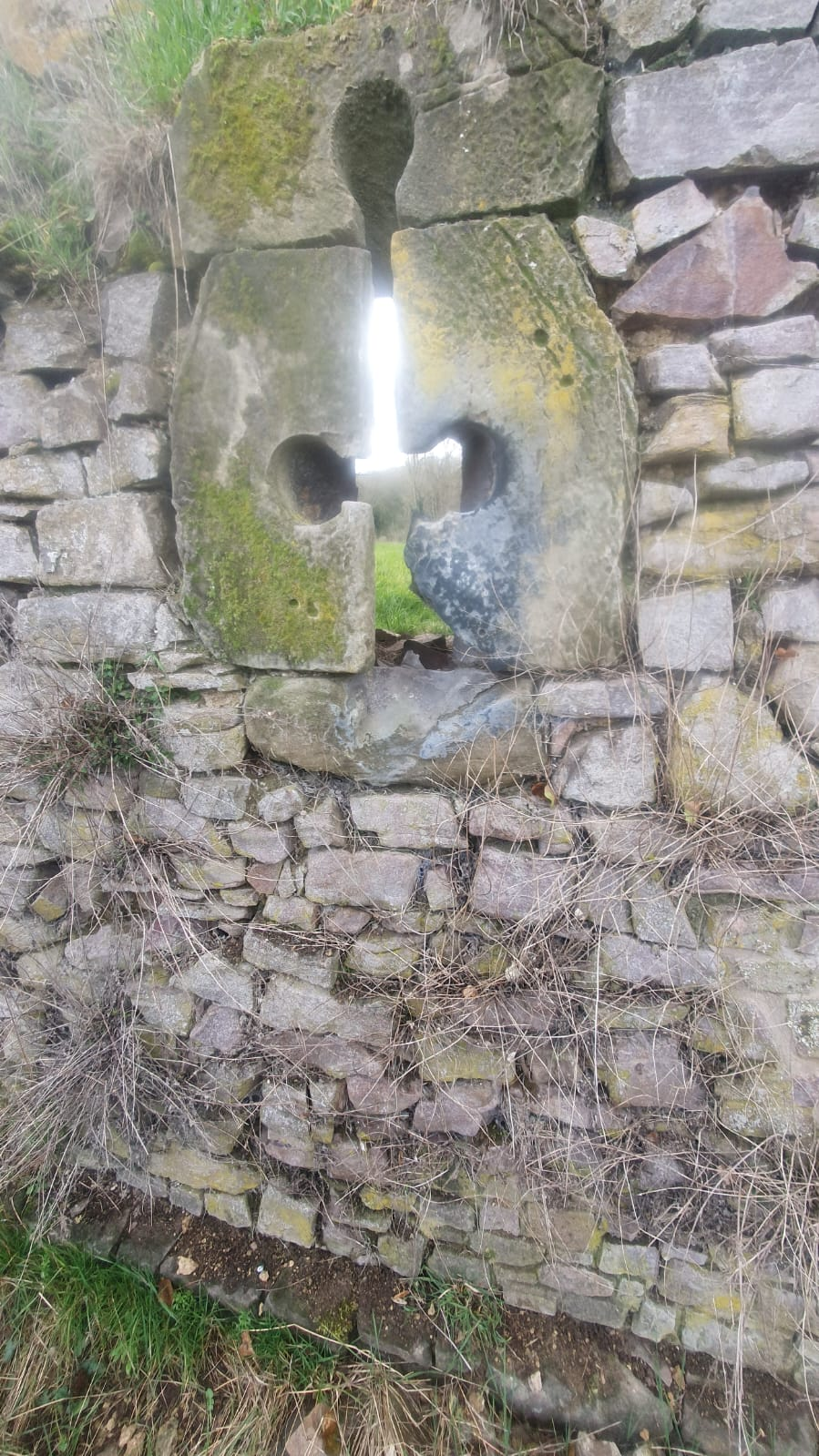
Arrowslit on the eastern curtain wall in 2023

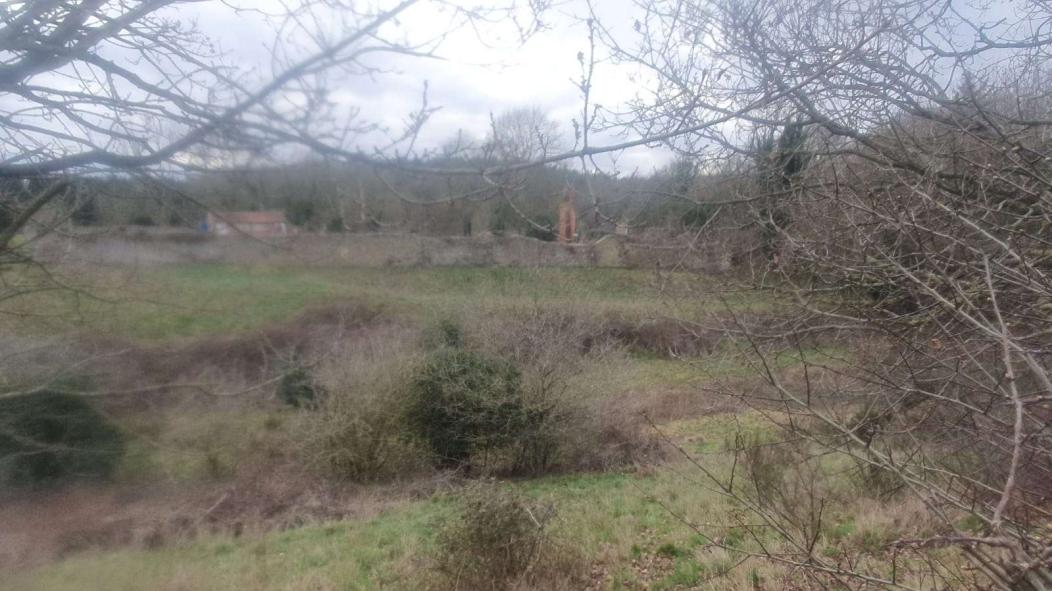
The eastern curtain wall as seen from the main road in 2023

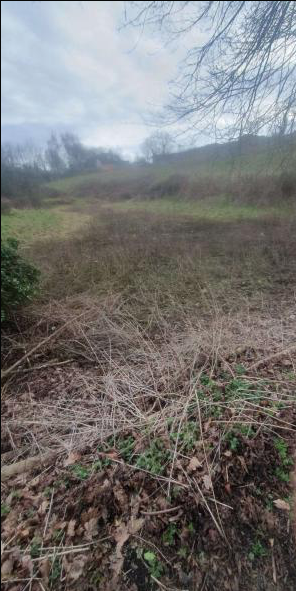
12th century ditch, on the eastern side in 2023

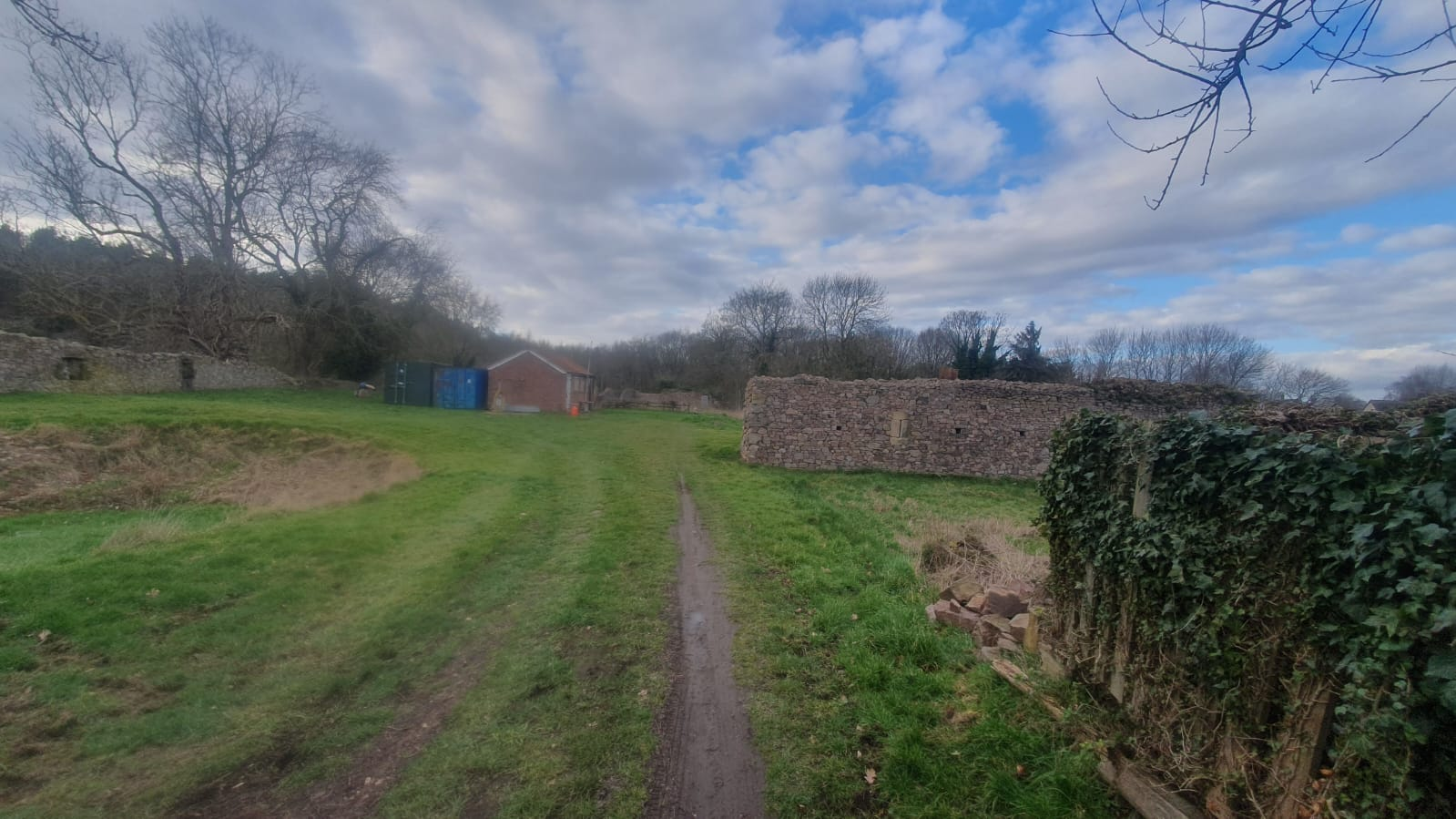
Location of the main entrance on the southern side, which no longer exists today, in 2023

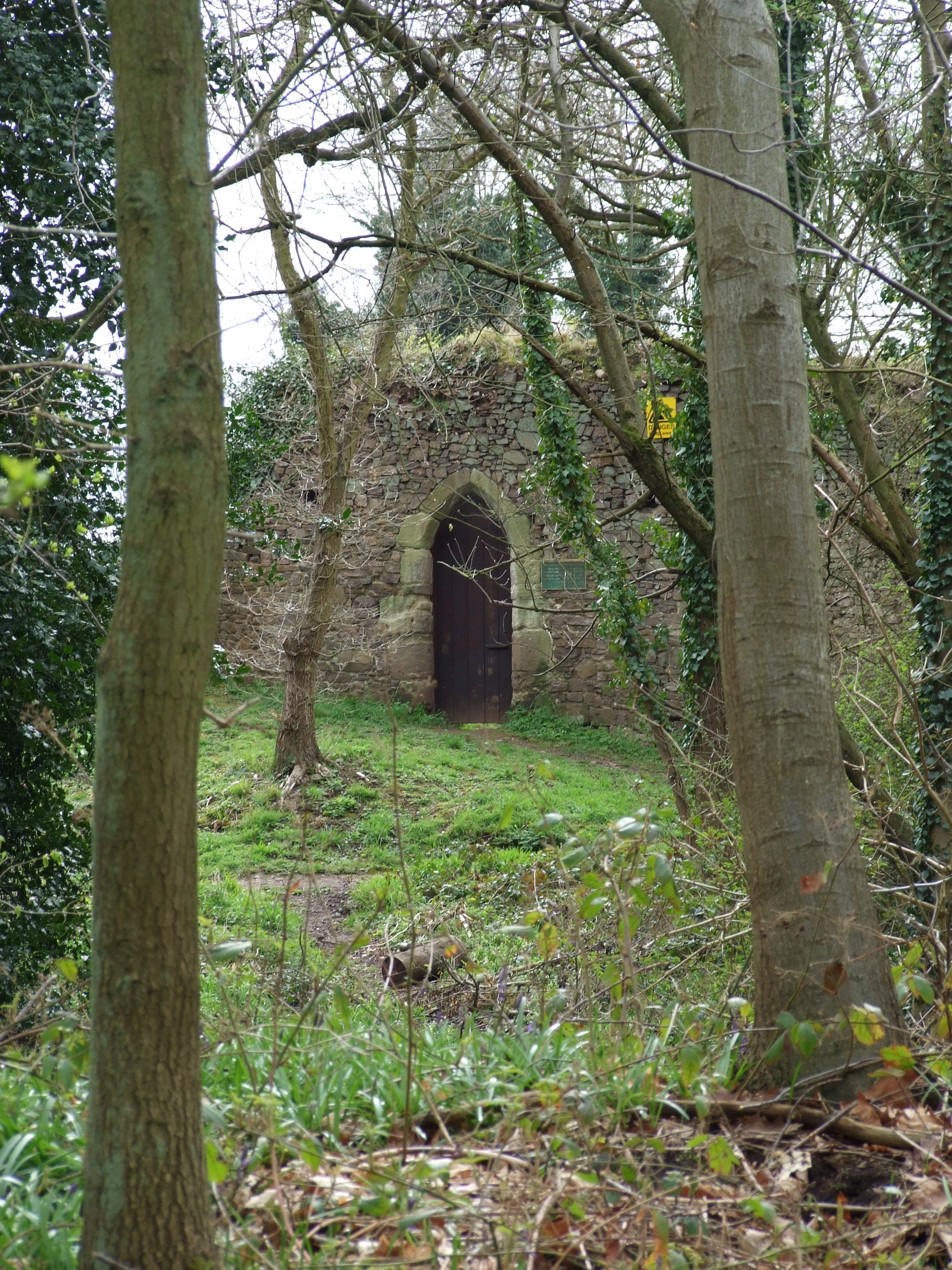
The northern entrance from the outside in 2006

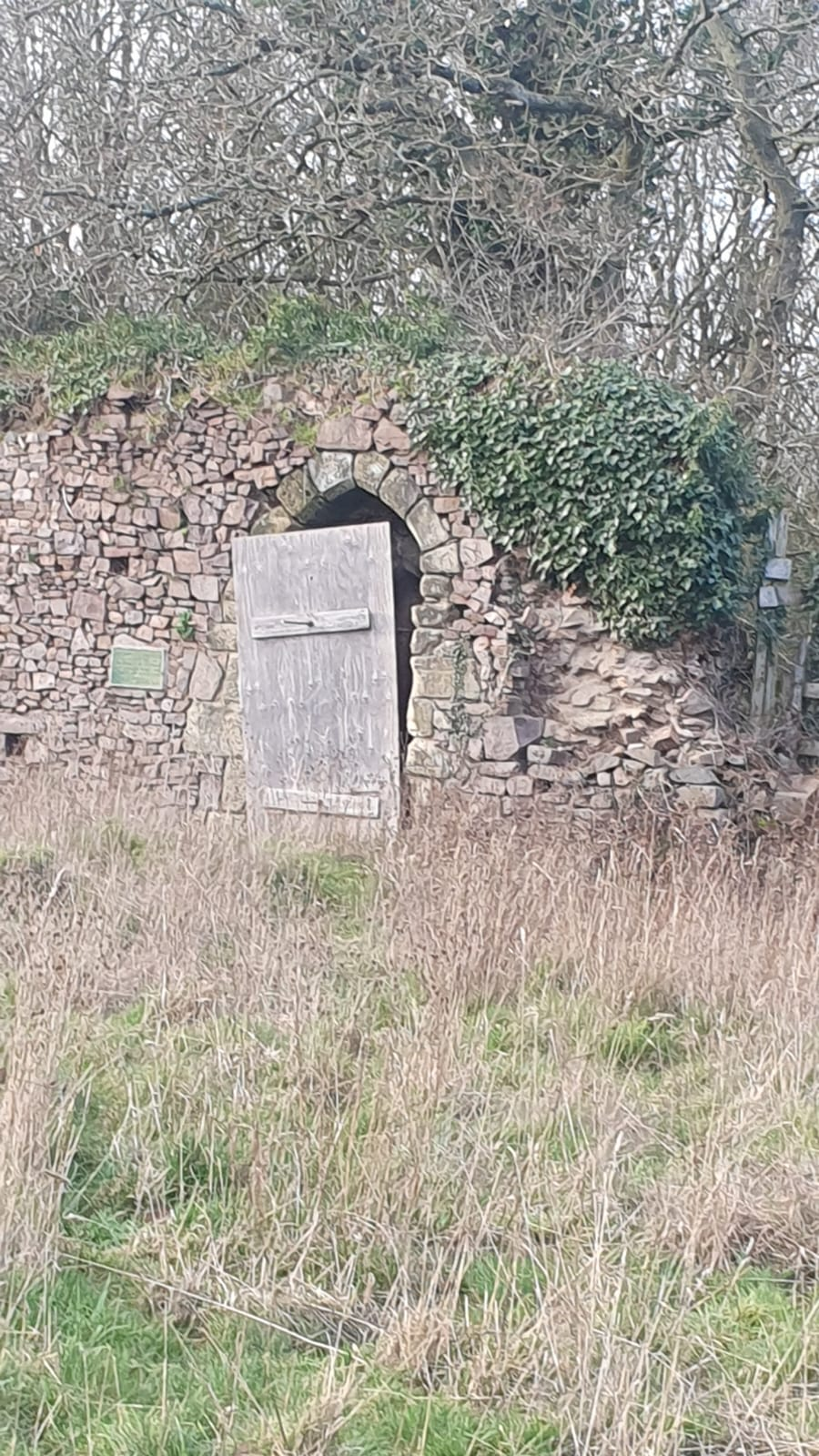
The northern entrance from the inside in 2023

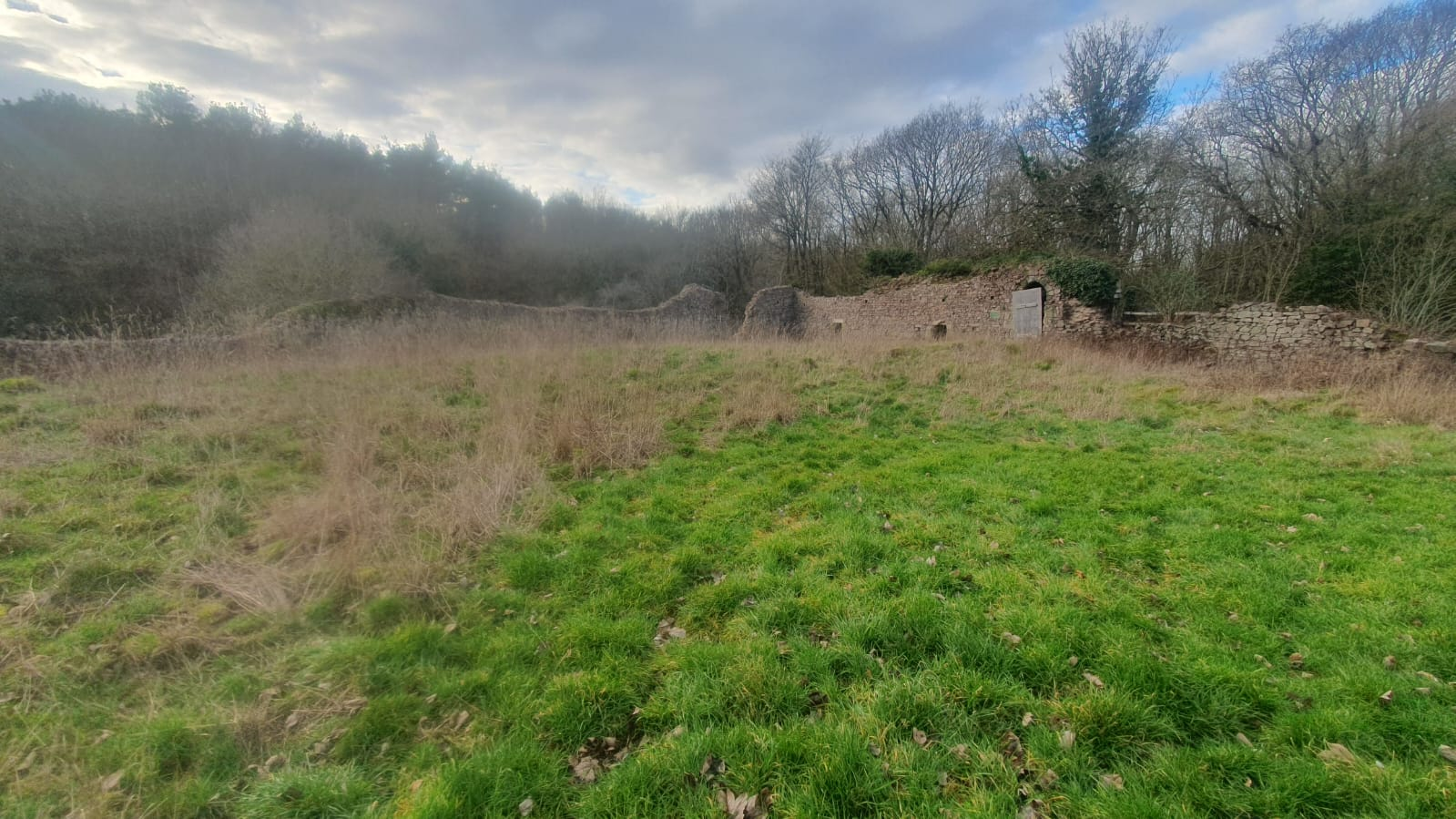
North-western curtain wall from the inside in 2023

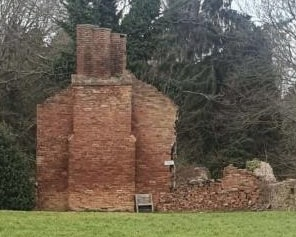
Exterior of the manor house in 2023

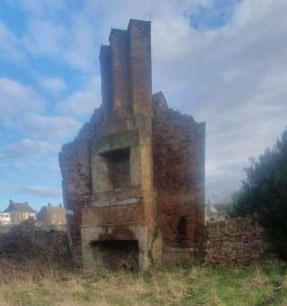
Interior of the manor house, with the remains of the fireplace present in 2023

== Other external links ==
- Heritage at Risk Register: Hartshill+Castle
