= Nicholas Chamberlaine School =

Nicholas Chamberlaine School and Sixth Form

Location
- Bulkington Road; Bedworth, Warwickshire, CV12 9EA; England

Information
- Type: Academy
- Motto: Successful Learners | Wide Horizons | High Achievement
- Department for Education URN: 139936 Tables
- Ofsted: Reports
- Head: Natalie Minty
- Gender: Coeducational
- Age: 11 to 18
- Enrolment: 1,252
- Capacity: 1,593
- Houses: Evans, Turing, Tubman, Curie
- Colours: Red, green, yellow, blue
- Website: www.nicholaschamberlaine-gst.org

Nicholas Chamberlaine School is a coeducational secondary school and sixth form with an academy status, located in the town of Bedworth, Warwickshire, England. It has approximately 1,400 pupils between the ages of 11 and 18.

Nicholas Chamberlaine VI Form College is located in the Ada Lovelace building on the school campus. It offers BTEC and A-Level subjects.

The school is named after Nicholas Chamberlaine (1632–1715), squire and benefactor of the town.

Nicholas Chamberlaine School has a specialist, separate provision (school) called the NEST for students with Special, Educational Needs housing primary and secondary students.

== History ==
The school officially opened in 1953 when the Headmaster was Gilbert Skinner; at this time NCS was a comprehensive school.

The school became a specialist technology college before transferring to an academy in September 2013, when it became affiliated with the Griffin Schools Trust.

Ofsted inspections in 2019 and 2021 judged that the school Requires Improvement. As of 2024, the school's most recent inspection was in April 2024, with an outcome of Good.

== Previous headteachers ==
- Gilbert Skinner
- Bryan Addison
- Lesley King
- Nick Smallman – Former Head Teacher
- Louise Newman – Former Principal
- Justin Creasey – Former Principal
- Mark Bland – Former Principal
- Paul Merrell – Former Head of School
- Peter Gilbride - Former Head of School
- Alison Ramsay - Former Executive Head

== Academic performance ==
In 2022, 28% of pupils achieved grade 5 or above in English and maths GCSEs. Because of the effect of the COVID-19 pandemic, the government recommends "Not making direct comparisons with data from previous years or between schools or colleges".

In 2019, the school's progress score at A Level was "well above average". The average result at the school was C−, compared to C+ in Warwickshire overall and C+ nationally.

== Qualifications at NCS ==
KS3:

- Students in Key Stage 3 (Year 7–9) have the chance to study English, Maths, Science, Art, Cuisine, Woodwork, Graphics, PE, History, Geography, RE, Music, Drama, French, Spanish and Computer Science. They also have an Accelerated Reader session once per week.

GCSE:

- Compulsory: English Language, English Literature, Mathematics, Combined Science (double award) or Triple Science (biology, chemistry, physics), French, History or Geography.
- Optional: Art, Business, Beauty Business, Computer Science, Cuisine, Drama, Fashion and Textiles, Graphics, Geography or History (depending on what was chosen as a compulsory subject), Health and Social Care, Music, Photography, Product Innovation (Woodwork), PE, Religious Studies, Psychology or Sociology.

A-Level:

- Art, Applied Science, Biology, Business Studies, Chemistry, Criminology, Digital iMedia, Drama, English Literature, French, Further Mathematics, Forensics, Geography, Government and Politics, History, Mathematics, Music, Medical Science, Media Studies, Philosophy and Ethics, Photography, Physics, Psychology, Sport, Sociology, Travel and Tourism.

== Notable former students ==
- Andy Blair (footballer)
- Pete Doherty, musician
- River Wilson-Bent, boxer
