= Hartshill =

Village and civil parish in Warwickshire, England

Coordinates: 52.5413°N 1.52066°W

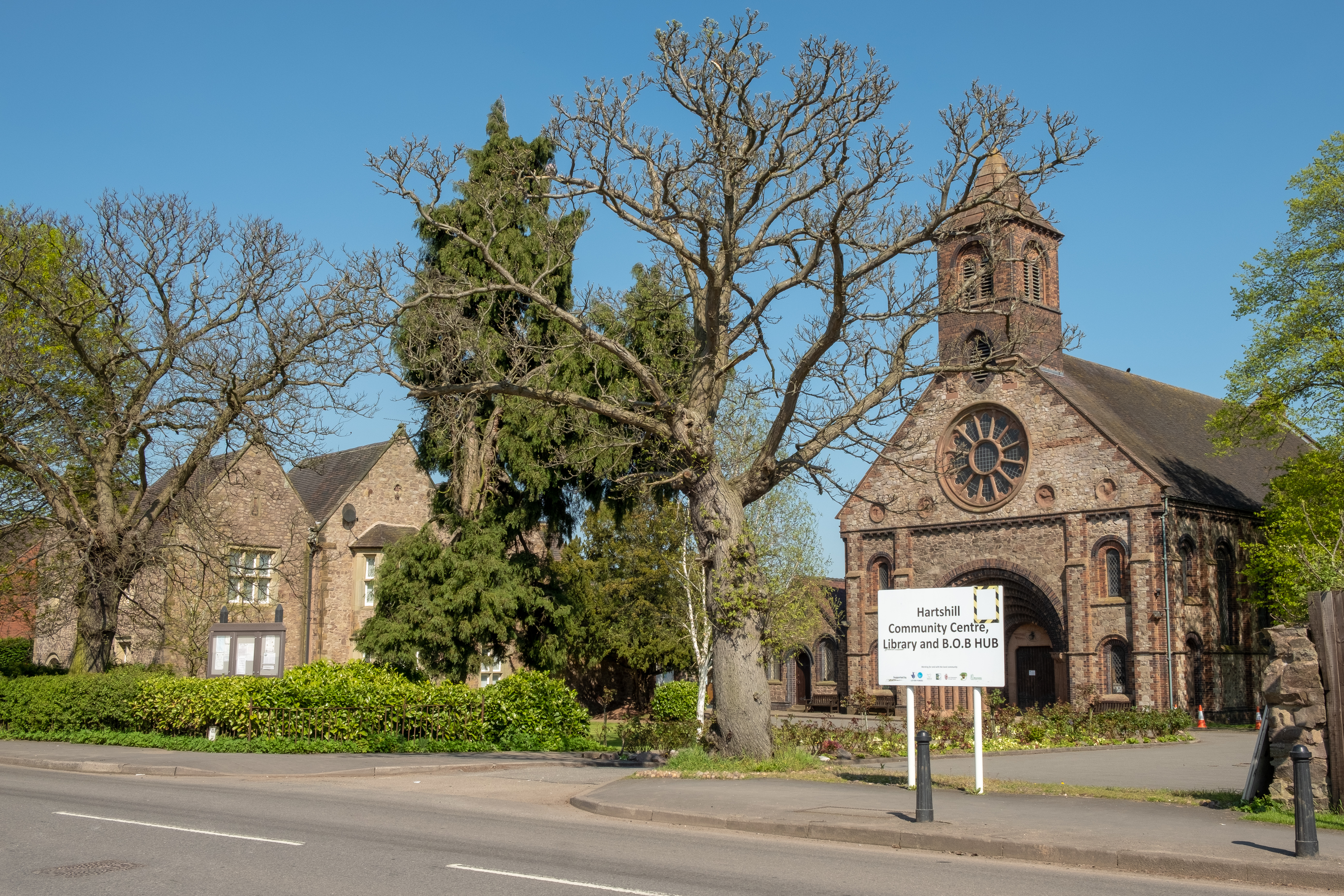
- Holy Trinity Church and vicarage, Hartshill

- Location within Warwickshire
- Population: 3,655 (2021 census)
- OS grid reference: SP326938
  - London: 95 mi (153 km) SW
- Civil parish: Hartshill
- District: North Warwickshire
- Shire county: Warwickshire
- Region: West Midlands
- Country: England
- Sovereign state: United Kingdom
- Post town: NUNEATON
- Postcode district: CV10
- Police: Warwickshire
- Fire: Warwickshire
- Ambulance: West Midlands

Hartshill is a large village and civil parish in North Warwickshire, England, contiguous with the much larger town of Nuneaton, the town centre of which is 2.5 miles (4 km) to the south-east. The parish borders the district of Nuneaton and Bedworth at the south, the North Warwickshire district parishes of Ansley at the south-west, Mancetter at the north-west, and Caldecote at the east, and the parish of Witherley in Leicestershire to the north-east from which it is separated by the A5 road. The market town of Atherstone is 3.5 miles (6 km) to the north-west.

At the 2021 census, the civil parish of Hartshill, which also includes the hamlet of Oldbury had a population of 3,655.

The village stands on a hill overlooking the Leicestershire plains to the north. The county boundary is defined by the A5 road, the former Roman Watling Street. The area has been settled since at least the Iron Age, just west of Hartshill are the remains of an Iron Age hill fort. The village was mentioned in the Domesday Book as Hardreshull, derived from the old English term meaning Heardred's Hill. Near the centre of the village are the remains of Hartshill Castle, a medieval castle.

The village grew due to its quarrying industry, which quarried red syenite and manganese from the local hillside. At one time there were several industrial tramways serving the local quarries and connecting them to the nearby Trent Valley railway line and Coventry Canal. The Talyllyn Railway locomotive Midlander was purchased in 1957 from Jee's quarries at Hartshill.

The most famous person associated with Hartshill was the Elizabethan poet Michael Drayton, who was born at Chapel Cottage in Hartshill Green in 1563. The cottage in which he was born was pulled down in 1941 due to a road widening scheme. There was a memorial to him in the form of the village bus shelter, which was erected in 1972, and was made from local stone and shaped like a scroll. This was removed around 2006 due to vandalism and replaced by a plaque. Michael Drayton Junior School in Hartshill also bears his name. Other schools in the village include Hartshill Academy secondary school.

The village church of Holy Trinity was built as a commissioners' church between 1843 and 1848 by T. L. Walker. It is made from local stone, and is noted for its large doorway which has six orders of columns and arches. The church is grade II listed.

The parish has five pubs: The Stag & Pheasant, The Malt Shovel, Royal Oak, the Hartshill Club, and The Anchor which is on the Coventry Canal.

Immediately west of the village is the Hartshill Hayes Country Park, which covers 137 acres (55 ha) of woodland.

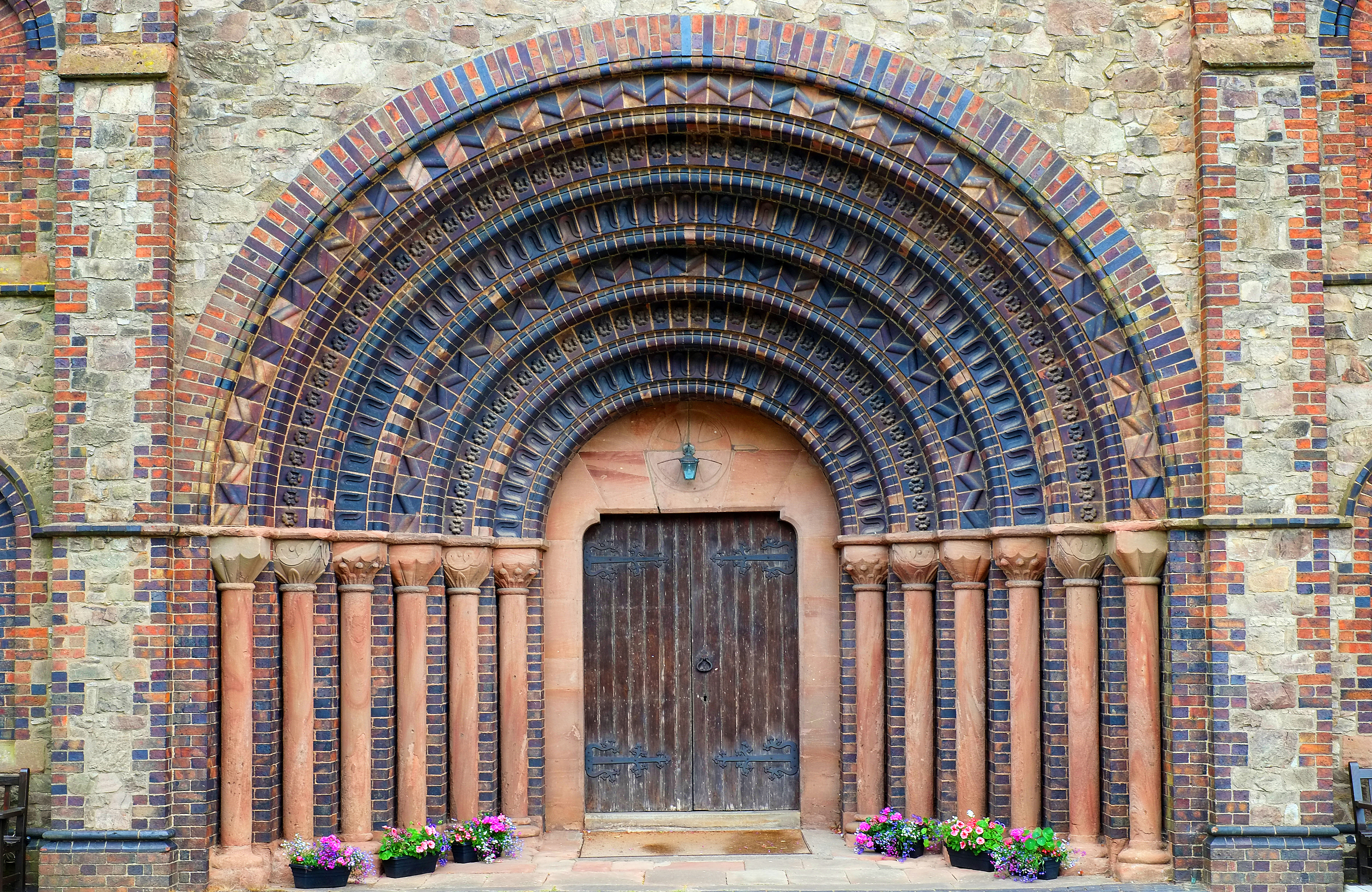
The entrance to Holy Trinity Church, Hartshill

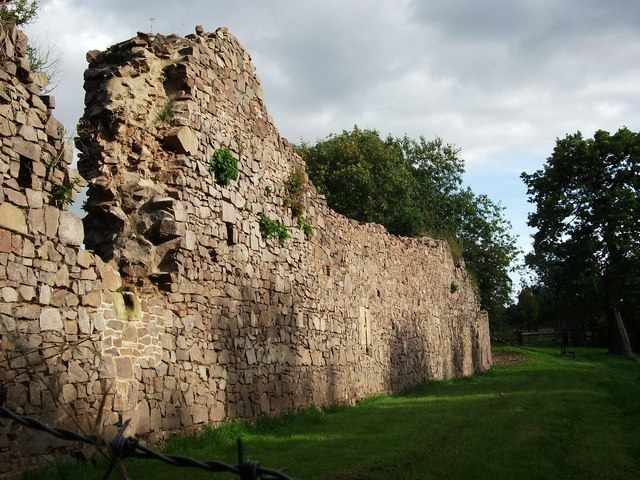
Remains of Hartshill Castle

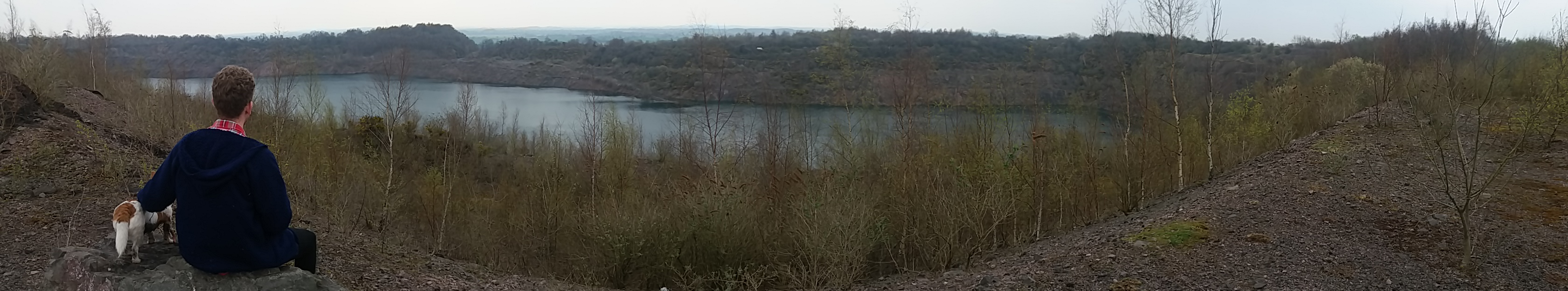
Disused quarry at Hartshill

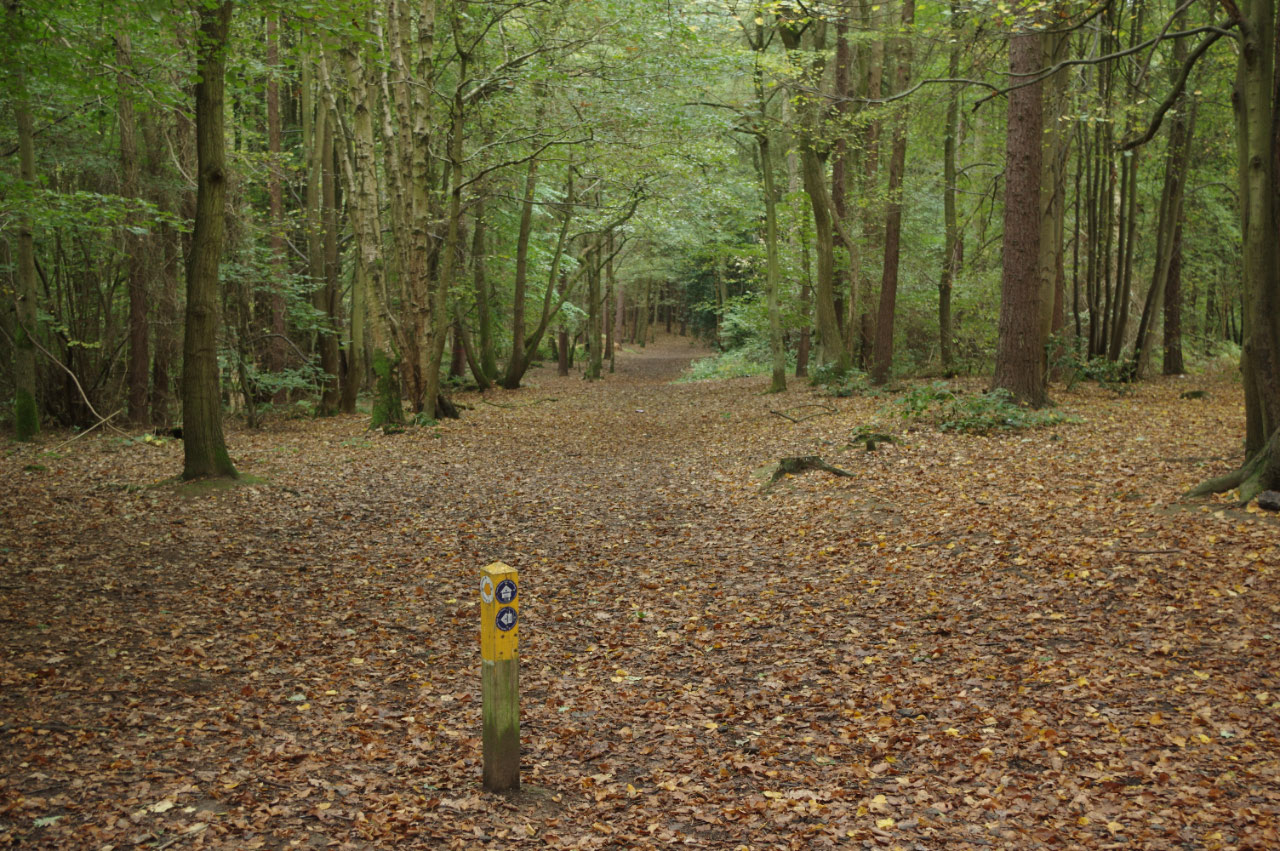
Hartshill Hayes Country Park

== Bibliography ==
- Potter, David (1990). The Talyllyn Railway. David St John Thomas. ISBN 0-946537-50-X.
