= Nicholas Chamberlaine Almshouses =

Charitable houses

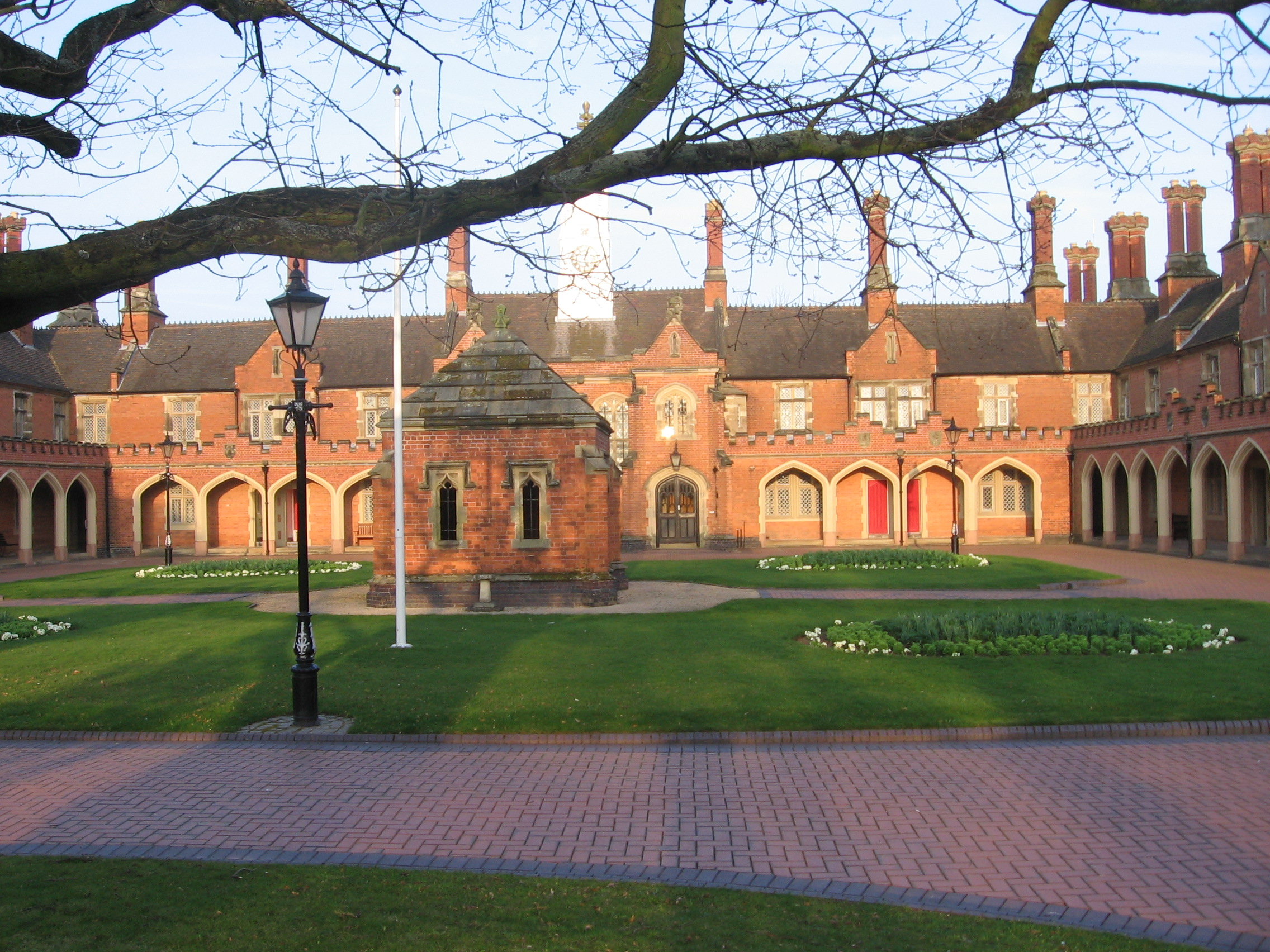
- Interactive map of Nicholas Chamberlaine Almshouses
- Location: All Saints Square, Bedworth, Warwickshire, England
- Coordinates: 52.480316°N 1.471979°W

Listed Building – Grade II*
- Official name: Chamberlaine's Almshouses
- Designated: 10 September 1974
- Reference no.: 1035003

Listed Building – Grade II
- Official name: Well House at Chamberlaine's Almshouses (known as the Pump House)
- Designated: 11 February 1988
- Reference no.: 1365021

The Nicholas Chamberlaine Almshouses are Grade II* listed almshouses in the town centre of Bedworth, Warwickshire, England. Dating from 1840, they remain in use for their original purpose.

== History ==
The original almshouses were built with money from an endowment left in the will of local priest and benefactor, Nicholas Chamberlaine, following his death in 1715. By the 1830s the original buildings were in a poor state of repair, and in need of replacement.

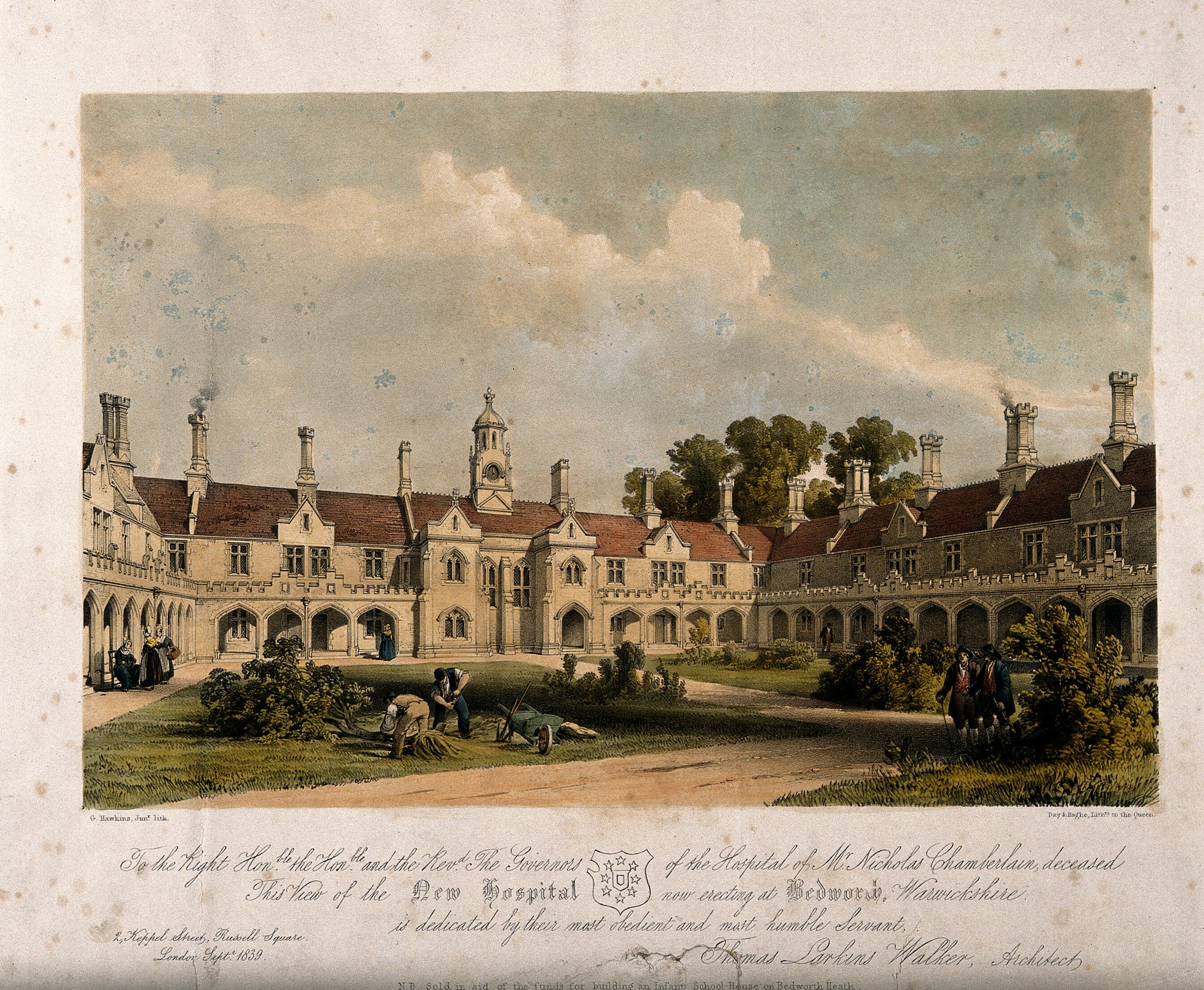
Historic drawing of the almshouses

The current buildings were built in 1840, designed by Thomas Larkins Walker in Tudor style at a cost of £8,500 (equivalent to 748,676 in 2025) and by 1874, they accommodated 40 persons.

By the 1970s the almshouses were once more in a poor state of repair and threatened with demolition, however a local campaign saw the buildings become listed in 1974, and a restoration project was undertaken during the 1980s.

== Today ==
The almshouses remain in use for their original purpose. There are 28 dwellings of both single and double accommodation on the ground and first floors. Each flat contains central heating, a lounge, kitchen, bedroom and bathroom and is self contained, and there is a shared laundry room.
