= East Midlands 1 =

Defunct English rugby union league

- Current season or competition: 2003–04 East Midlands 1
- Sport: Rugby union
- Instituted: 1987; 39 years ago
- Ceased: 2004; 22 years ago
- Number of teams: 9
- Country: England
- Holders: Biggleswade (3rd title) (2003–04) (promoted to Midlands 4 East (South))
- Most titles: Biggleswade (3 titles)
- Website: East Midlands RFU

East Midlands 1 was a tier 9 English Rugby Union league with teams from Bedfordshire, Northamptonshire and parts of Cambridgeshire taking part. Promoted teams moved up to Midlands 4 East (North) (formerly Midlands East 2) and relegated teams dropped to East Midlands 2. Originally a feeder league for East Midlands/Leicestershire, it ran for three spells between 1987–1992, 1996–1998 (as East Midlands) and 2000–2004.

At the end of the 2003–04 season the East Midlands leagues were restructured and the majority of teams in East Midlands 1 were transferred into the new East Midlands/South Leicestershire 1 division.

== Original teams ==
When league rugby began in 1987, this division contained the following teams:

- Ampthill
- Biggleswade
- Daventry
- Dunstablians
- Huntingdon & District
- Northampton BBOB
- Northampton Old Scouts
- Rushden & Higham
- St Neots
- Wellingborough
- Wellingborough Old Grammarians (Note: Old Boys side of Wellingborough Grammar School.)

== East Midlands 1 honours ==
=== East Midlands 1 (1987–1992) ===
The original East Midlands 1 was a tier 8 league. Promotion was to East Midlands/Leicestershire and relegation to East Midlands 2. At the end of the 1991–92 season all of the East Midlands and Leicestershire leagues were merged and most sides in East Midlands 1 transferred to the new East Midlands/Leicestershire 2. (Note: East Midlands/Leicestershire 2 was mostly formed of teams from East Midlands 1 and Leicestershire 1)

East Midlands 1
Season	No of teams	Champions	Runners–up	Relegated teams	Reference
1987–88	11	Wellingborough	St Neots	Dunstablians, Wellingborough Old Grammarians	
1988–89	11	Biggleswade	Ampthill	St Neots	
1989–90	11	Ampthill	Northampton Men's Own	Corby	
1990–91	11	Northampton BBOB	Brackley	Old Northamptonians, Daventry, Rushden & Higham	
1991–92	11	Long Buckby (Note: Restructuring of the Midlands leagues saw champions Long Buckby promoted two levels up into the newly introduced Midlands East 2.)	St Neots (Note: Restructuring saw clubs ranked 2nd to 7th, including St Neots, Brackley, Northampton Men's Own, Northampton Old Scouts, Huntingdon & District and St Ives, promoted up into the newlook East Midlands/Leicestershire 1. All other clubs would be transferred into the newly introduced East Midlands/Leicestershire 2.)	No relegation (Note: The merging of the East Midlands and Leicestershire leagues meant there was no relegation.)	
Green backgrounds are promotion places.

=== East Midlands (1996-1998) ===
After an absence of four seasons the division was reintroduced, this time as East Midlands, sitting at tier 10 of the league system. Promotion was to East Midlands/Leicestershire 1 and there was no relegation. Remerging of all the East Midlands and Leicestershire leagues meant that East Midlands was cancelled at the end of the 1997–98 season and the majority of teams transferred into East Midlands/Leicestershire 2.

East Midlands 1
Season	No of teams	Champions	Runners–up	Relegated teams	Reference
1996–97	10	Deepings	Northampton Casuals	No relegation	
1997–98	10	Northampton Casuals	Oundle (Note: All teams other than the champions Northampton Casuals were transferred into East Midlands/Leicestershire 2.)	No relegation	
Green backgrounds are the promotion places.

=== East Midlands 1 (2000–2004) ===
An East Midlands division returned for the third time, this time renamed back to East Midlands 1 and rising to become a tier 9 league following the cancellation of the East Midlands/Leicestershire leagues at the end of the 1999–00 season. (Note: Restructuring at the end of the 1999–00 season would see the merger of the Leicestershire and Notts, Lincs & Derbyshire divisions and the East Midlands sides reforming their own leagues. This meant that East Midlands/Leicestershire 1, East Midlands/Leicestershire 2 and East Midlands/Leicestershire 3 were cancelled.) Promotion was to the newly introduced Midlands 4 East (South) and relegation to East Midlands 2. East Midlands 1 was cancelled at the end of the 2003–04 season and most teams transferred into the new East Midlands/South Leicestershire 1.

East Midlands 1
Season	No of teams	Champions	Runners–up	Relegated teams	Reference
2000–01	11	Biggleswade	Bugbrooke	Bedford Swifts	
2001–02	10	Northampton BBOB	Rushden & Higham	Deepings, St Ives	
2002–03	9	Daventry	Biddenham	Bedford Queens, Kempston	
2003–04	9	Biggleswade	Vauxhall Motors (Note: Restructuring meant that the top two clubs were promoted into Midlands 4 East (South), while clubs ranked 3rd to 8th, including Northampton BBOB, Bugbrooke, Wellingborough Old Grammarians, Brackley, Bedford Swifts and St Ives were transferred into the new East Midlands/South Leicestershire 1.)	No relegation (Note: Although there was no relegation due to the cancellation of East Midlands 1, bottom club Peterborough Lions were transferred into the new East Midlands/South Leicestershire 2.)	
Green backgrounds are the promotion places.

== Number of league titles ==
- Biggleswade (3)
- Northampton BBOB (2)
- Ampthill (1)
- Daventry (1)
- Deepings (1) (Note: Deepings title was when league was known as East Midlands.)
- Long Buckby (1)
- Northampton Casuals (1) (Note: Northampton Casuals title was when league was known as East Midlands.)
- Wellingborough (1)

== See also ==
- East Midlands 2
- East Midlands 3
- Midlands RFU
- East Midlands RFU
- English rugby union system
- Rugby union in England
