= East Midlands/Leicestershire 1 =

English rugby union league

- Current season or competition: 1999–00 East Midlands/Leicestershire 1
- Sport: Rugby union
- Instituted: 1987; 39 years ago (as East Midlands/Leicestershire)
- Ceased: 2000; 26 years ago
- Number of teams: 12
- Country: England
- Holders: Melton Mowbray (1st title) (1999–00) (promoted to Midlands 4 East (North))
- Most titles: Multiple teams (1 title)

East Midlands/Leicestershire 1 (formerly East Midlands/Leicestershire) was a tier 9 English Rugby Union league with teams from Bedfordshire, parts of Cambridgeshire, Leicestershire and Northamptonshire taking part. Promoted teams moved up to Midlands 4 East (North) (formerly Midlands East 2) and relegated teams dropped to East Midlands/Leicestershire 2.

At the end of the 1999–00 season the East Midlands/Leicestershire leagues split. Most teams in East Midlands/Leicestershire 1 were transferred into either Midlands 4 East (South) or Notts, Lincs & Derbyshire/Leicestershire 1 East.

== Original teams ==
When league rugby began in 1987 this division (then known as East Midlands/Leicestershire) contained the following teams:

- Aylestone St James
- Bedford Athletic
- Long Buckby
- Luton
- Melton Mowbray
- Northampton Trinity Old Boys (Note: Old Boys side of Trinity High School.)
- Oadby Wyggestonian
- Old Northamptonians (Note: Old Boys side of Northampton Grammar School.)
- South Leicester
- Stewart & Lloyds
- Towcestrians

== East Midlands/Leicestershire 1 honours ==
=== East Midlands/Leicestershire (1987–1992) ===
Originally known as East Midlands/Leicestershire, it was a tier 7 league with promotion to Midlands 2 East and relegation to either East Midlands 1 or Leicestershire 1.

East Midlands/Leicestershire
Season	No of teams	Champions	Runners–up	Relegated teams	Reference
1987–88	11	Stewart & Lloyds	Towcestrians	Melton Mowbray, South Leicester	
1988–89	11	Towcestrians	Wellingborough	Wigston, Loughborough	
1989–90	11	Biggleswade	Wellingborough	Hinckley, Oadby Wyggestonian	
1990–91	11	Bedford Athletic	Belgrave	Northampton Trinity Old Boys, Long Buckby	
1991–92	11	Hinckley (Note: League restructuring saw champions Hinckley promoted into the newly introduced Midlands East 1.)	Stoneygate (Note: League restructuring meant that the top five clubs were promoted into Midlands East 1, including Belgrave, Luton and Ampthill.)	Aylestone St James (Note: Aylestone St James were demoted two levels to the new East Midlands/Leicestershire 3.)	
Green backgrounds are promotion places.

=== East Midlands/Leicestershire 1 (1992–1993) ===
Restructuring saw the division renamed as East Midlands/Leicestershire 1, dropping two levels to become a tier 9 league. Promotion and relegation was now to the newly introduced Midlands East 2 and East Midlands/Leicestershire 2.

East Midlands/Leicestershire 1
Season	No of teams	Champions	Runners–up	Relegated teams	Reference
1992–93	13	Kibworth	Loughborough	St Ives	
Green backgrounds are the promotion places.

=== East Midlands/Leicestershire 1 (1993–1996) ===
The top six teams from Midlands 1 and the top six from North 1 were combined to create National 5 North, meaning that East Midlands/Leicestershire 1 dropped another level to become a tier 10 league. Promotion continued to Midlands East 2 and relegation to East Midlands/Leicestershire 2.

East Midlands/Leicestershire 1
Season	No of teams	Champions	Runners–up	Relegated teams	Reference
1993–94	13	Huntingdon & District	Oadby Wyggestonian	Brackley	
1994–95	13	Old Northamptonians	Bedford Queens	Daventry, Old Bosworthians	
1995–96	13	Northampton Men's Own	Bedford Queens (Note: The cancellation of National 5 North and subsequent restructuring meant that the top six clubs were promoted into Midlands East 2 including Northampton Old Scouts, Oadby Wyggestonian, Dunstablians and Loughborough.)	No relegation (Note: Due to widespread league restructuring there was no relegation.)	
Green backgrounds are the promotion places.

=== East Midlands/Leicestershire 1 (1996–1998) ===
At the end of the 1995–96 season National 5 North was discontinued and East Midlands/Leicestershire 1 returned to being a tier 9 league. Promotion continued to Midlands East 2 while relegation was now to East Midlands or Leicestershire 1.

East Midlands/Leicestershire 1
Season	No of teams	Champions	Runners–up	Relegated teams	Reference
1996–97	16	Luton	Oakham	No relegation (Note: No relegation as league due to increase from 16 to 17 teams.)	
1997–98	17	Leicester Forest	Loughborough Students	Multiple teams (Note: Restructuring meant that eight teams were relegation into the reintroduced East Midlands/Leicestershire 2, including Aylestone St James, Colworth House, Deepings, Old Ashbeians, Brackley, Wellingborough Old Grammarians, St Neots and Bugbrooke.)	
Green backgrounds are the promotion places.

=== East Midlands/Leicestershire 1 (1998–2000) ===
East Midlands/Leicestershire remained a tier 9 league for the 1998–99 season. Promotion continued to Midlands East 2 but relegation was to the reintroduced East Midlands/Leicestershire 2. At the end of the 1999–00 campaign the league was cancelled and teams either transferred into the new Midlands 4 East (South) and Notts, Lincs & Derbyshire/Leicestershire 1 East divisions or dropping out of the league system altogether.

East Midlands/Leicestershire 1
Season	No of teams	Champions	Runners–up	Relegated teams	Reference
1998–99	12	Market Bosworth	Loughborough Students	Bedford Queens	(Note: 1998–99 East Midlands/Leicestershire 1 mistakenly referred to as East Midlands 1 on RFU website.)
1999–00	12	Melton Mowbray (Note: Champions Melton Mowbray were promoted to the newly introduced Midlands 4 East (South).)	Loughborough Students (Note: Restructuring meant that the top three sides including Northampton Casuals went into Midlands 4 East (South). Oakham (4th) and Old Newtonians (9th) went into the new Notts, Lincs & Derbyshire/Leicestershire 1 East. The rest of the clubs dropped out of the league.)	No relegation (Note: The merger of cancellation of the East Midlands/Leicestershire leagues meant there was no relegation.)	(Note: 1999–00 East Midlands/Leicestershire 1 mistakenly referred to as East Midlands 1 on RFU website.)
Green backgrounds are the promotion places.

== Number of league titles ==
- Bedford Athletic (1)
- Biggleswade (1)
- Hinckley (1)
- Huntingdon & District (1)
- Leicester Forest (1)
- Luton (1)
- Market Bosworth (1)
- Kibworth (1)
- Melton Mowbray (1)
- Northampton Men's Own (1)
- Old Northamptonians (1)
- Stewart & Lloyds (1)
- Towcestrians (1)

== See also ==
- East Midlands/Leicestershire 2
- East Midlands/Leicestershire 3
- East Midlands/Leicestershire 4
- Midlands RFU
- East Midlands RFU
- Leicestershire RU
- English rugby union system
- Rugby union in England
