= East Midlands 2 =

English Rugby Union team

East Midlands 1
- Current season or competition: 2003–04 East Midlands 2
- Sport: Rugby union
- Instituted: 1987; 39 years ago
- Ceased: 2004; 22 years ago
- Number of teams: 7
- Country: England
- Holders: Corby (1st title) (2003–04) (promoted to East Midlands/South Leicestershire 1 (Note: Champions Corby would typically have moved up into East Midlands 1 but the cancellation of the East Midlands leagues meant they went into the new East Midlands/South Leicestershire 1 instead.))
- Most titles: Multiple teams (1 title)
- Website: East Midlands RFU

East Midlands 2 was a tier 10 English Rugby Union league with teams from Bedfordshire, Northamptonshire and parts of Cambridgeshire taking part. Promoted teams moved up to East Midlands 1 and relegated teams dropped to East Midlands 3 until that division was cancelled at the end of the 1991–92 season. Restructuring of the East Midlands leagues at the end of the 2003–04 campaign meant that East Midlands 2 was discontinued and the majority of teams transferred into the new East Midlands/South Leicestershire 2 division.

== Original teams ==
When league rugby began in 1987, this division contained the following teams:

- Brackley
- Corby
- Cutler Hammer
- Deepings
- Northampton Casuals
- Northampton Men's Own
- Old Wellingburians (Note: Old Boys side of Wellingborough School.)
- Oundle
- Sharnbrook & Colworth
- St Ives
- Vauxhall Motors

== East Midlands 2 honours ==
=== East Midlands 1 (1987–1992) ===
The original East Midlands 2 was a tier 9 league. Promotion was to East Midlands 1 and relegation to East Midlands 3. At the end of the 1991–92 season all of the East Midlands and Leicestershire leagues were merged and most sides in East Midlands 2 transferred to the new East Midlands/Leicestershire 2 (Note: East Midlands/Leicestershire 2 was mostly formed of teams from East Midlands 2 and Leicestershire 2).

East Midlands 2
Season	No of teams	Champions	Runners–up	Relegated teams	Reference
1987–88	11	Northampton Men's Own	Brackley	Deepings, Old Wellingburians	
1988–89	11	Wellingborough Old Grammarians	Corby	Cutler Hammer	
1989–90	11	St Neots	Bedford Queens	Deepings	
1990–91	11	Northampton Casuals	St Ives	Vauxhall Motors, Westwood, Bedfordshire Police	
1991–92	11	Rushden & Higham (Note: Restructuring of the Midlands leagues saw champions Rushden & Higham transferred into the new East Midlands/Leicestershire 2.)	Daventry (Note: Restructuring saw the top three clubs including Dunstablians transferred into the new East Midlands/Leicestershire 2. Clubs ranked 4th to 10th, including Old Wellingburians, Oundle, Colworth House, Deepings, Bugbrooke, Bedford Swifts and Old Northamptonians went into East Midlands/Leicestershire 3.)	No relegation (Note: Although there was no relegation due to restructuring, bottom club Corby were transferred into the newly introduced East Midlands/Leicestershire 4.)	
Green backgrounds are promotion places.

=== East Midlands 2 (2000–2004) ===
After a gap of seven years East Midlands 2 was reintroduced ahead of the 2000–01 season as a tier 10 league. Promotion was to East Midlands 1 and there was no relegation. East Midlands 2 was cancelled at the end of the 2003–04 campaign and most teams transferred into the new East Midlands/South Leicestershire 2.

East Midlands 2
Season	No of teams	Champions	Runners–up	Relegated teams	Reference
2000–01	10	Kempston	Peterborough Lions	No relegation	
2001–02	8	Biddenham	Bedford Swifts	No relegation	
2002–03	8	Vauxhall Motors	St Ives	No relegation	
2003–04	7	Corby (Note: Restructuring would see champions Corby transferred into the new East Midlands/South Leicestershire 1.)	Oundle (Note: Runners up Oundle would also be transferred into East Midlands/South Leicestershire 1. All other clubs would join East Midlands/South Leicestershire 2.)	No relegation	
Green backgrounds are the promotion places.

== Number of league titles ==
- Biddenham (1)
- Corby (1)
- Kempston (1)
- Northampton Casuals (1)
- Northampton Men's Own (1)
- Rushden & Higham (1)
- St Neots (1)
- Vauxhall Motors (1)
- Wellingborough Old Grammarians (1)

== See also ==
- East Midlands 1
- East Midlands 3
- Midlands RFU
- East Midlands RFU
- English rugby union system
- Rugby union in England
