= East Midlands/Leicestershire 3 =

English rugby union league

- Current season or competition: 1999–00 East Midlands/Leicestershire 3
- Sport: Rugby union
- Instituted: 1992; 34 years ago
- Ceased: 2000; 26 years ago
- Number of teams: 7
- Country: England
- Holders: Kempston (1999–00) (transferred to East Midlands 2 (Note: Restructuring meant that champions Kempston were transferred into East Midlands 2 instead of East Midlands/Leicestershire 2.))
- Most titles: Multiple teams (1 title)

East Midlands/Leicestershire 3 was a tier 11 English Rugby Union league with teams from Bedfordshire, parts of Cambridgeshire, Leicestershire and Northamptonshire taking part. Promoted teams moved up to East Midlands/Leicestershire 2 and relegated teams dropped to East Midlands/Leicestershire 4 until that division was cancelled at the end of the 1995–96 season.

The league ran for two spells between 1992–96 and 1998–00. At the end of the 1999–00 season it was cancelled for the second time following the splitting of the East Midlands and Leicestershire leagues and all teams transferred into East Midlands 2.

== Original teams ==
When this division was introduced in 1992 as part of a merger of the East Midlands and Leicestershire leagues it contained the following teams:

- Antsey - transferred from Leicestershire 2 (4th)
- Burbage - transferred from Leicestershire 2 (7th)
- Bedford Swifts - transferred from East Midlands 2 (5th)
- Bugbrooke - transferred from East Midlands 2 (6th)
- Colworth House (Note: Colworth House RUFC would be renamed as Sharnbrook & Colworth RUFC in 2001.) - transferred from East Midlands 2 (8th)
- Deepings - transferred from East Midlands 2 (7th)
- Old Newtonians - transferred from Leicestershire 2 (3rd)
- Old Northamptonians - transferred from East Midlands 2 (4th)
- Old Wellingburians (Note: Old Boys side of Wellingborough School.) - transferred from East Midlands 2 (10th)
- Oundle - transferred from East Midlands 2 (9th)
- Shepsted - transferred from Leicestershire 2 (5th)
- West Leicester (Note: West Leicester RFC would later merge with Old Bosworthians RFC in 1997 to form Leicester Forest RFC.) - transferred from Leicestershire 2 (6th)
- Westwood (Note: Westwood RUFC would later by renamed as Peterborough Lions RFC in 2005.) - transferred from East Midlands 3 (champions)

== East Midlands/Leicestershire 3 honours ==
=== East Midlands/Leicestershire 3 (1992–1993) ===
The original East Midlands/Leicestershire 3 was a tier 11 league. Promotion was to East Midlands/Leicestershire 2 and relegation to East Midlands/Leicestershire 4.

East Midlands/Leicestershire 3
Season	No of teams	Champions	Runners–up	Relegated teams	Reference
1992–93	13	Old Northamptonians	Bugbrooke	No relegation (Note: Restructuring of the number of teams in the East Midlands/Leicestershire leagues meant there was no relegation from East Midlands/Leicestershire 3.)	
Green backgrounds are the promotion places.

=== East Midlands/Leicestershire 3 (1993–1996) ===
The top six teams from Midlands 1 and the top six from North 1 were combined to create National 5 North, meaning that East Midlands/Leicestershire 3 dropped another level to become a tier 12 league. Promotion continued to East Midlands/Leicestershire 2 and relegation to East Midlands/Leicestershire 4. The division was cancelled at the end of the 1995–96 season due to the splitting of the East Midlands and Leicestershire leagues. (Note: Restructuring meant that East Midlands/Leicestershire 2, East Midlands/Leicestershire 3 and East Midlands/Leicestershire 4 were cancelled. Only East Midlands/Leicestershire 1 remained intact.)

East Midlands/Leicestershire 3
Season	No of teams	Champions	Runners–up	Relegated teams	Reference
1993–94	12	Bedford Swifts	Colworth House	Burbage	
1994–95	12	Kempston	New Parks Old Boys	Old Wellingburians, West Leicester	
1995–96	13	Oundle (Note: League restructuring caused by the cancellation of the East Midlands/Leicestershire leagues saw champions Oundle transferred to East Midlands.)	Deepings (Note: The splitting of the East Midlands/Leicestershire leagues meant that Deepings, Vauxhall Motors, Corby, Westwood, Northampton Heathens and Thorney went into East Midlands, while Old Newtonians, Wigston, West Leicester and Aylestonians went into Leicestershire 1.)	No relegation (Note: Although there was no relegation due to the cancellation of the East Midlands/Leicestershire leagues, bottom club Burbage were transferred to Leicestershire 2.)	
Green backgrounds are the promotion places.

=== East Midlands/Leicestershire 3 (1998–2000) ===
East Midlands/Leicestershire 3 returned after an absence of several seasons as a tier 11 league. Promotion was to East Midlands/Leicestershire 2 and there was no relegation. (Note: East Midlands/Leicestershire 4 was cancelled at the end of the 1995–96 season and was not reintroduced) At the end of the 1999–00 campaign the league was cancelled for the second time and all teams transferred into East Midlands 2.

East Midlands/Leicestershire 3
Season	No of teams	Champions	Runners–up	Relegated teams	Reference
1998–99	9	Corby	Biddenham	No relegation	(Note: 1998–99 East Midlands/Leicestershire 3 mistakenly referred to as Notts, Lincs & Derbyshire/Leicestershire 2 West on RFU website.)
1999–00	7	Kempston (Note: Restructuring meant champions Kempston were transferred into the reintroduced East Midlands 2 instead of East Midlands/Leicestershire 2.)	Northampton Heathens (Note: The cancellation of the East Midlands/Leicestershire leagues meant that all teams were transferred into East Midlands 2 asides from Colworth House and Aylestone who dropped out of the leagues.)	No relegation	(Note: 1999–00 East Midlands/Leicestershire 3 mistakenly referred to as Notts, Lincs & Derbyshire/Leicestershire 2 West on RFU website.)
Green backgrounds are the promotion places.

== Number of league titles ==
- Kempston (2)
- Bedford Swifts (1)
- Corby (1)
- Old Northamptonians (1)
- Oundle (1)

== See also ==
- East Midlands/Leicestershire 1
- East Midlands/Leicestershire 2
- East Midlands/Leicestershire 4
- Midlands RFU
- East Midlands RFU
- Leicestershire RU
- English rugby union system
- Rugby union in England
