= Counties 2 Midlands East (South) =

Level 8 English Rugby Union league

- Current season or competition: 2024-25 Counties 2 Midlands East (South)
- Sport: Rugby union
- Instituted: 1992; 34 years ago (as Midlands East 2)
- Number of teams: 12
- Country: England
- Most titles: Leicester Forest, Lutterworth, Market Harborough, Rushden & Higham, Stamford (2 titles)
- Website: England RFU

Counties 2 Midlands East (South) (formerly Midlands 3 East (South)) is a level 8 English rugby union league and level 3 of the Midlands League, made up of teams from the southern part of the East Midlands region including clubs from Bedfordshire, Leicestershire, Northamptonshire and occasionally Cambridgeshire and Oxfordshire, all of whom play home and away matches throughout the season. When this division began in 1992 it was known as Midlands East 2, until it was split into two regional divisions called Midlands 4 East (North) and Midlands 4 East (South) ahead of the 2000–01 season. Further restructuring of the Midlands leagues ahead of the 2009–10 season, led to the current name of Midlands 3 East (South). Further restructuring of the Midlands leagues ahead of the 2009–10 season saw it changed to Midlands 2 East (South). After the RFU's Adult Competition Review, from season 2022–23 it adopted its current name.

Promoted teams move up to Counties 1 Midlands East (South) while demoted teams drop into Counties 3 Midlands East North West, Counties 3 Midlands East North East, Counties 3 Midlands East Central or Counties 3 Midlands East South depending on location.

== 2026-27 ==
Departing were Oundle II and Leighton Buzzard, promoted to Counties 1 Midlands East (South) as champions and runners-up respectively.

Huntingdon & District (11th) and Rugby Lions (12th) were relegated to Counties 3 Midlands East South (South).

=== Participating teams and locations ===
Team	Ground	Capacity	City/area	Previous season
Brackley	Nightingale Close		Brackley, Northamptonshire	10th
Dunstablians	Bidwell Park		Houghton Regis, Bedfordshire	Relegated from Counties 1 Midlands East (South) (12th)
Leicester Lions II	Westleigh Park	2,000	Blaby, Leicestershire	Promoted from Counties 3 Midlands East (South North)
Northampton Casuals	Rush Mills House		Northampton, Northamptonshire	6th
Old Laurentians	Fenley Field		Rugby, Warwickshire	4th
Old Northamptonians II	Sir Humphrey Cripps Pavilion		Northampton, Northamptonshire	Promoted from Counties 3 Midlands East South (South)
Peterborough Lions	Bretton Woods		Bretton, Cambridgeshire	9th
Rushden & Higham	Manor Park		Rushden, Northamptonshire	8th
Stewarts & Lloyds	Occupation Road		Corby, Northamptonshire	Relegated from Counties 1 Midlands East (South) (10th)
St Ives	Somersham Road		St Ives, Cambridgeshire	5th
St Neots	The Common		St Neots, Cambridgeshire	7th
Stockwood Park	London Road		Luton, Bedfordshire	3rd

Locations of the 2026-27 Counties 2 Midlands East (South) teams

== 2025–26 ==
Departing were Long Buckby and Dunstablians, promoted to Counties 1 Midlands East (South) as champions and runners-up respectively.

Rugby St Andrews (9th) and Oakham (10th) were relegated to Counties 3 Midlands East South (North) while Northampton BBOB (11th) were relegated to Counties 3 Midlands East South (South).

=== Participating teams and locations ===
Team	Ground	Capacity	City/area	Previous season
Brackley	Nightingale Close		Brackley, Northamptonshire	6th
Huntingdon & District	Huntingdon Racecourse		Brampton, Huntingdon, Cambridgeshire	7th
Leighton Buzzard	Wright's Meadow		Leighton Buzzard, Buckinghamshire	Promoted from Counties 3 Midlands East (South)
Northampton Casuals	Rush Mills House		Northampton, Northamptonshire	5th
Old Laurentians	Fenley Field		Rugby, Warwickshire	Relegated from Counties 1 Midlands East (South)
Oundle II	Occupation Road		Oundle, Northamptonshire	New entry
Peterborough Lions	Bretton Woods		Bretton, Cambridgeshire	Relegated from Counties 1 Midlands East (South)
Rugby Lions	Webb Ellis Road	3,200 (200 seats)	Rugby, Warwickshire	Promoted from Counties 3 Midlands East (South)
Rushden & Higham	Manor Park		Rushden, Northamptonshire	4th
St Ives	Somersham Road		St Ives, Cambridgeshire	3rd
St Neots	The Common		St Neots, Cambridgeshire	8th
Stockwood Park	London Road		Luton, Bedfordshire	Relegated from Counties 1 Midlands East (South)

Locations of the 2025-26 Counties 2 Midlands East (South) teams

== 2024–25 ==
Departing were Biggleswade and Stewarts & Lloyds, promoted to Counties 1 Midlands East (South). Luton (11th) and Bedford Queens (12th) were relegated to Counties 3 Midlands East (South). Bedford Swifts (10th) elected to withdraw from the leagues and instead play merit table rugby for 2024–25.

Joining were Long Buckby and Oakham, relegated from Counties 1 Midlands East (South), together with Northampton BBOB and Rugby St Andrews, both promoted.

With five teams departing and four joining the league was reduced in size from twelve clubs to eleven.

=== Participating teams and locations ===
Team	Ground	Capacity	City/area	Previous season
Brackley	Nightingale Close		Brackley, Northamptonshire	6th
Dunstablians	Bidwell Park		Houghton Regis, Bedfordshire	8th
Huntingdon & District	Huntingdon Racecourse		Brampton, Huntingdon, Cambridgeshire	5th
Long Buckby	Station Road		Long Buckby, Northamptonshire	Relegated from Counties 1 Midlands East (South)
Northampton BBOB	Saint Andrew's Road		Northampton, Northamptonshire	Promoted from Counties 3 Midlands East (South) (runners-up)
Northampton Casuals	Rush Mills House		Northampton, Northamptonshire	9th
Oakham	Rutland Showground		Oakham, Rutland	Relegated from Counties 1 Midlands East (South)
Rugby St Andrews	Ashlawn Road		Rugby, Warwickshire	Promoted from Counties 3 Midlands East (South) (champions)
Rushden & Higham	Manor Park		Rushden, Northamptonshire	7th
St Ives	Somersham Road		St Ives, Cambridgeshire	4th
St Neots	The Common		St Neots, Cambridgeshire	3rd

Locations of the 2024–25 Counties 2 Midlands East (South) teams

== 2023–24 ==
Departing were Daventry and Spalding, promoted to Counties 1 Midlands East (South). Melton Mowbray (6th) moved on a level transfer to Counties 2 Midlands East (North). Northampton BBOB and Northampton Men's Own were relegated.

Joining were St Ives, Dunstablians and Northampton Casuals, relegated from Counties 1 Midlands East (South), together with Bedford Swifts and Brackley, both promoted.

=== Participating teams and locations ===
Team	Ground	Capacity	City/area	Previous season
Bedford Queens	Putnoe Woods	500	Bedford, Bedfordshire	10th
Bedford Swifts	International Athletics Stadium		Bedford, Bedfordshire	Promoted from Counties 3 Midlands East (South) (runners-up)
Biggleswade	Langford Road		Biggleswade, Bedfordshire	7th
Brackley	Nightingale Close		Brackley, Northamptonshire	Promoted from Counties 3 Midlands East (South) (champions)
Dunstablians	Bidwell Park		Houghton Regis, Bedfordshire	Relegated from Counties 1 Midlands East (South)
Huntingdon & District	Huntingdon Racecourse		Brampton, Huntingdon, Cambridgeshire	8th
Luton	Newlands Road		Luton, Bedfordshire	5th
Northampton Casuals	Rush Mills House		Northampton, Northamptonshire	Relegated from Counties 1 Midlands East (South)
Rushden & Higham	Manor Park		Rushden, Northamptonshire	4th
Stewarts & Lloyds	Occupation Road		Corby, Northamptonshire	3rd
St Ives	Somersham Road		St Ives, Cambridgeshire	Relegated from Counties 1 Midlands East (South)
St Neots	The Common		St Neots, Cambridgeshire	9th

Locations of the 2023–24 Counties 2 Midlands East (South) teams

== 2022–23 ==
This was the first season following the RFU Adult Competition Review with the league adopting its new name of Counties 2 Midlands East (South)).

Departing were Stockwood Park, Dunstablians and Bourne, all promoted to Counties 1 Midlands East (South).

Joining were Biggleswade, Northampton BBOB and St Neots, all promoted.

=== Participating teams and locations ===
Team	Ground	Capacity	City/area	Previous season
Bedford Queens	Putnoe Woods	500	Bedford, Bedfordshire	10th
Biggleswade	Langford Road		Biggleswade, Bedfordshire	Promoted from Midlands 4 East (South) (champions)
Daventry	Daventry & District Sports Club		Daventry, Northamptonshire	12th
Huntingdon & District	Huntingdon Racecourse		Brampton, Huntingdon, Cambridgeshire	6th
Luton	Newlands Road		Luton, Bedfordshire	8th
Melton Mowbray	Melton Sports Village		Melton Mowbray, Leicestershire	5th
Northampton BBOB	Saint Andrew's Road		Northampton, Northamptonshire	Promoted from Midlands 4 East (South) (3rd)
Northampton Men's Own	Stoke Road		Ashton, Northamptonshire	9th
Rushden & Higham	Manor Park		Rushden, Northamptonshire	4th
Spalding	Memorial Field		Spalding, Lincolnshire	11th
Stewarts & Lloyds	Occupation Road		Corby, Northamptonshire	7th
St Neots	The Common		St Neots, Cambridgeshire	Promoted from Midlands 4 East (South) (runners-up)

Locations of the 2022–23 Counties 2 Midlands East (South) teams

== 2021–22 ==
=== Participating teams and locations ===
Team	Ground	Capacity	City/area	Previous season
Bedford Queens	Putnoe Woods	500	Bedford, Bedfordshire	10th
Bourne	Milking Nook Drove		Bourne, Lincolnshire	3rd
Daventry	Daventry & District Sports Club		Daventry, Northamptonshire	9th
Dunstablians	Bidwell Park		Houghton Regis, Bedfordshire	5th
Huntingdon & District	Huntingdon Racecourse		Brampton, Huntingdon, Cambridgeshire	8th
Luton	Newlands Road		Luton, Bedfordshire	Relegated from London 2 North West (12th)
Melton Mowbray	Melton Sports Village		Melton Mowbray, Leicestershire	Relegated from Midlands 2 ES (11th)
Northampton Men's Own	Stoke Road		Ashton, Northamptonshire	Promoted from Midlands 4 ES (runners-up)
Rushden & Higham	Manor Park		Rushden, Northamptonshire	7th
Spalding	Memorial Field		Spalding, Lincolnshire	6th
Stewarts & Lloyds	Occupation Road		Corby, Northamptonshire	Relegated from Midlands 2 ES (12th)
Stockwood Park	London Road		Luton, Bedfordshire	4th

Locations of the 2021–22 Midlands 3 East (South) teams

== 2020–21 ==
Due to the COVID-19 pandemic, the 2020–21 season was cancelled.

== 2019–20 ==
=== Participating teams and locations ===
Team	Ground	Capacity	City/area	Previous season
Bedford Queens	Putnoe Woods	500	Bedford, Bedfordshire	8th
Bourne	Milking Nook Drove		Bourne, Lincolnshire	7th
Daventry	Daventry & District Sports Club		Daventry, Northamptonshire	4th
Dunstablians	Bidwell Park		Houghton Regis, Bedfordshire	6th
Huntingdon & District	Huntingdon Racecourse		Brampton, Huntingdon, Cambridgeshire	Relegated from Midlands 2 ES (12th)
Northampton BBOB	Saint Andrew's Road		Northampton, Northamptonshire	Promoted from Midlands 4 ES (champions)
Oakham	Rutland Showground		Oakham, Rutland	Relegated from Midlands 2 ES (11th)
Rushden & Higham	Manor Park		Rushden, Northamptonshire	10th
Spalding	Memorial Field		Spalding, Lincolnshire	Level transfer from Midlands 3 EN (3rd)
St Neots	The Common		St Neots, Cambridgeshire	9th
Stamford	Hambleton Road		Stamford, Lincolnshire	3rd
Stockwood Park	London Road		Luton, Bedfordshire	5th

Locations of the 2019–20 Midlands 3 East (South) teams

== 2018–19 ==
=== Participating teams and locations ===
Team	Ground	Capacity	City/area	Previous season
Bedford Queens	Putnoe Woods	500	Bedford, Bedfordshire	10th
Biggleswade	Langford Road		Biggleswade, Bedfordshire	5th
Birstall	Co-Op Sports Ground		Birstall, Leicestershire	Level transfer from Midlands 3 East (North) (7th)
Bourne	Milking Nook Drove		Bourne, Lincolnshire	Promoted from Midlands 4 East (South) (runners up)
Daventry	Daventry & District Sports Club		Daventry, Northamptonshire	6th
Dunstablians	Bidwell Park		Houghton Regis, Bedfordshire	9th
Leicester Forest	Hinckley Road		Leicester Forest East, Leicestershire	4th
Northampton Casuals	Rush Mills House		Northampton, Northamptonshire	3rd
Rushden & Higham	Manor Park		Rushden, Northamptonshire	8th
St Neots	The Common		St Neots, Cambridgeshire	Promoted from Midlands 4 East (South) (champions)
Stamford	Hambleton Road		Stamford, Lincolnshire	Relegated from Midlands 2 East (South) (11th)
Stockwood Park	London Road		Luton, Bedfordshire	7th

Locations of the 2018–19 Midlands 3 East (South) teams

== 2017–18 ==
=== Participating teams and locations ===
Team	Ground	Capacity	City/area	Previous season
Bedford Queens	Putnoe Woods	500	Bedford, Bedfordshire	Promoted from Midlands 4 East (South)
Biggleswade	Langford Road		Biggleswade, Bedfordshire	7th
Daventry	Daventry & District Sports Club		Daventry, Northamptonshire	9th
Dunstablians	Bidwell Park		Houghton Regis, Bedfordshire	5th
Leicester Forest	Hinckley Road		Leicester Forest East, Leicestershire	8th
Northampton BBOB	Saint Andrew's Road		Northampton, Northamptonshire	6th
Northampton Casuals	Rush Mills House		Northampton, Northamptonshire	4th
Northampton Mens Own	Stoke Road		Ashton, Northamptonshire	10th
Rushden & Higham	Manor Park		Rushden, Northamptonshire	Relegated from Midlands 2 East (North) (12th)
St Ives (Midlands)	Somersham Road		St Ives, Cambridgeshire	3rd
Stockwood Park	London Road		Luton, Bedfordshire	Relegated from London 2 North West (12th)
Vipers	Vipers Ground		Whetstone, Leicestershire	Relegated from Midlands 2 East (North) (11th)

Locations of the 2017–18 Midlands 3 East (South) teams

== Teams 2016-17 ==
- Aylestone St James (transferred from Midlands 3 East (North))
- Biggleswade (relegated from Midlands 2 East (South))
- Daventry
- Dunstablians
- Leicester Forest (relegated from Midlands 2 East (South))
- Long Buckby
- Northampton BBOB
- Northampton Casuals
- Northampton Men's Own (promoted from Midlands 4 East (South))
- St Ives (Midlands)
- St Neots
- Stewarts & Lloyds

== Teams 2015-16 ==
- Daventry
- Dunstablians (relegated from Midlands 2 East (South))
- Long Buckby
- Northampton BBOB
- Northampton Casuals
- Old Newtonians (promoted from Midlands 4 East (South))
- Oundale
- Rugby St Andrews
- Stockwood Park
- St Ives (Midlands)
- St Neots (promoted from Midlands 4 East (South))
- Stewarts & Lloyds (relegated from Midlands 2 East (South))

== Teams 2014-15 ==
- Bedford Queens
- Daventry
- Long Buckby (promoted from Midlands 4 East (South))
- Northampton BBOB (relegated from Midlands 2 East (South))
- Northampton Casuals
- Northampton Mens Own
- Oundale (promoted from Midlands 4 East (South))
- Rugby St Andrews
- Rushden & Higham (relegated from Midlands 2 East (South))
- St Ives (Midlands)
- Stockwood Park
- Vipers

== Teams 2013-14 ==
- Bedford Queens
- Biggleswade (relegated from Midlands 2 East (South))
- Brackley (promoted from Midlands 4 East (South))
- Daventry
- Deepings
- Northampton Casuals
- Northampton Mens Own
- Rugby St Andrews
- St Ives (Midlands) (promoted from Midlands 4 East (South))
- Stewarts & Lloyds
- Stockwood Park
- Vipers (relegated from Midlands 2 East (South))

== Teams 2012–13 ==
- Bedford Queens
- Daventry
- Deepings
- Long Buckby
- Northampton Casuals
- Northampton Mens Own
- Old Newtonians
- Rugby St Andrews
- Rushden & Higham
- Stamford
- Stewarts & Lloyds
- Stockwood Park

== Teams 2011–12 ==
- Bedford Queens
- Bedford Swifts
- Biggleswade
- Brackley
- Daventry
- Deepings
- Northampton BBOB
- Northampton Casuals
- Rugby St Andrews
- Rushden & Higham
- Stamford
- Stewarts & Lloyds

== Teams 2010–11 ==
- Bedford Queens
- Bedford Swifts
- Brackley
- Daventry
- Deepings
- Long Buckby
- Northampton Casuals
- Northampton Mens Own
- Oadby Wyggestonians
- Old Newtonians
- Rugby St Andrews
- Rushden & Higham

== Teams 2008–09 ==
- Aylestone St James
- Banbury
- Huntingdon & District
- Leicester Forest
- Lutterworth
- Northampton BBOB
- Northampton Old Scouts
- Old Newtonians
- Old Northamptonians
- Stewarts & Lloyds
- Towcestrians
- Vipers

== Original teams ==
Teams in Midlands 3 East (North) and Midlands 3 East (South) were originally part of a single division called Midlands 2 East, which contained the following sides when it was introduced in 1992:

- Coalville - promoted from East Midlands/Leicestershire (6th)
- Glossop - promoted from Notts, Lincs & Derbyshire 1 (6th)
- Kesteven - promoted from Notts, Lincs & Derbyshire 1 (9th)
- Kettering - promoted from East Midlands/Leicestershire (7th)
- Lincoln - promoted from Notts, Lincs & Derbyshire 1 (10th)
- Long Buckby - promoted from East Midlands 1 (champions)
- Lutterworth - promoted from East Midlands/Leicestershire (10th)
- Market Rasen & Louth - promoted from Notts, Lincs & Derbyshire 2 (runners up)
- Northampton BBOB - promoted from East Midlands/Leicestershire (9th)
- South Leicester - promoted from Leicestershire 1 (champions)
- Southwell - promoted from Notts, Lincs & Derbyshire 1 (7th)
- Stamford - promoted from Notts, Lincs & Derbyshire 1 (8th)
- Wellingborough - promoted from East Midlands/Leicestershire (8th)
- Worksop - promoted from Notts, Lincs & Derbyshire 2 (champions)

== Midlands 3 East (South) honours ==
=== Midlands East 2 (1992–1993) ===
Midlands 3 East (North) and Midlands 3 East (South) were originally part of a single tier 8 division called Midlands East 2. Promotion was to Midlands East 1 and relegation was to either East Midlands/Leicestershire 1 or Notts, Lincs & Derbyshire 1.

Midlands East 2
Season	No of teams	Champions	Runners–up	Relegated teams	Reference
1992–93	14	Kettering	Northampton BBOB	Glossop, Southwell, Market Rasen & Louth, Stamford	
Green backgrounds are the promotion places.

=== Midlands East 2 (1993–1996) ===
The top six teams from Midlands 1 and the top six from North 1 were combined to create National 5 North, meaning that Midlands 2 East dropped to become a tier 9 league. Promotion continued to Midlands East 1 while relegation was to either East Midlands/Leicestershire 1 or Notts, Lincs & Derbyshire 1.

Midlands East 2
Season	No of teams	Champions	Runners–up	Relegated teams	Reference
1993–94	13	Long Buckby	Wellingborough	Dronfield, Kesteven	
1994–95	13	Ilkeston	Huntingdon & District	Worksop, Grimsby, Luton	
1995–96	13	Lutterworth	Old Northamptonians (Note: Due to the cancellation of National 5 North at the end of the season, eight clubs were promoted including Lincoln, Wellingborough, Nottingham Moderns, Ashbourne, Northampton BBOB and Coalville.)	No relegation (Note: Due to widespread restructuring caused by the cancellation of National 5 North there was no relegation.)	
Green backgrounds are the promotion places.

=== Midlands East 2 (1996–2000) ===
At the end of the 1995–96 season National 5 North was discontinued and Midlands East 2 returned to being a tier 8 league. Promotion continued to Midlands East 1 while relegation was to either East Midlands/Leicestershire 1 or Notts, Lincs & Derbyshire 1.

Midlands East 2
Season	No of teams	Champions	Runners–up	Relegated teams	Reference
1996–97	17	Northampton Men's Own	Northampton Old Scouts	Chesterfield Panthers, East Retford, Mellish	
1997–98	17	Dunstablians	Oadby Wyggestonian	Bedford Queens, Northampton BBOB	
1998–99	17	Luton	South Leicester	Nottingham Casuals, Biggleswade	
1999–00	17	Market Bosworth (Note: Champions Market Bosworth would be promoted into the new Midlands 3 East (North).)	Long Eaton (Note: Due to Midlands league restructuring five clubs would be promoted including Glossop (3rd) and Loughborough who would go up into Midlands 3 East (North), while Vipers (4th) would go up into Midlands 3 East (South).)	No relegation (Note: As Midlands East 2 was due to split up into two regional leagues there was no relegation. Clubs that were not promoted were transferred into either Midlands 4 East (North) or Midlands 4 East (South).)	
Green backgrounds are the promotion places.

=== Midlands 4 East (South) (2000–2006) ===
Restructuring ahead of the 2000–01 season saw Midlands East 2 split into two tier 8 regional leagues - Midlands 4 East (North) and Midlands 4 East (South). Promotion was now to Midlands 3 East (North) (Note: Prior to the 2000–01 season Midlands 3 East (North) and Midlands 3 East (South) were part of a Midlands East 1.) and relegation to East Midlands 1.

Midlands 4 East (South)
Season	No of teams	Champions	Runners–up	Relegated teams	Reference
2000–01	10	Market Harborough	Melton Mowbray	Sleaford, West Bridgford, Stamford	
2001–02	10	Lutterworth	Old Northamptonians	Oakham, Bugbrooke	
2002–03	10	Rushden & Higham	Stockwood Park	Biggleswade, Northampton BBOB	
2003–04	10	Coalville	Daventry	No relegation (Note: No relegation but Biddenham would drop out of the league for the following season.)	
2004–05	9	Leicester Forest	Northampton Casuals	Market Harborough	
2005–06	10	Vauxhall Motors	Bugbrooke	Stoneygate	
Green backgrounds are promotion places.

=== Midlands 4 East (South) (2006–2009) ===
Midlands 4 East (South) continued to be a tier 8 league with promotion up into Midlands 3 East (South). However, the cancellation of East Midlands 1 at the end of the 2005–06 season meant that relegation was now to the newly introduced Midlands 5 East (South).

Midlands 4 East (South)
Season	No of teams	Champions	Runners–up	Relegated teams	Reference
2006–07	10	Vipers	Northampton BBOB	Biggleswade, Rushden & Higham	
2007–08	10	Aylestone St James	Old Newtonians	Oadby Wyggestonians, Stockwood Park	
2008–09	12	Market Harborough	Peterborough Lions	No relegation (Note: No relegation but Vauxhall Motors would drop out of the league for the following season.)	
Green backgrounds are promotion places.

=== Midlands 3 East (South) (2009–present) ===
League restructuring by the RFU meant that Midlands 4 East (North) and Midlands 4 East (South) were renamed as Midlands 3 East (North) and Midlands 3 East (South), with both leagues remaining at tier 8. Promotion was now to Midlands 2 East (South) (formerly Midlands 3 East (South)) and relegation to Midlands 4 East (South) (formerly Midlands 5 East (South)).

Midlands 3 East (South)
Season	No of teams	Champions	Runners–up	Relegated teams	Reference
2009–10	11	Bugbrooke	Stockwood Park	No relegation (Note: No relegation as the division would increase from 11 to 12 teams for the next season.)	
2010–11	12	Oadby Wyggestonians	Long Buckby	Northampton Mens Own, Old Newtonians	
2011–12	12	Northampton BBOB	Biggleswade	Brackley, Bedford Swifts	
2012–13	12	Stamford	Rushden & Higham	Old Newtonians, Long Buckby	
2013–14	12	Biggleswade	Stewarts & Lloyds	Deepings, Brackley	
2014–15	12	Rushden & Higham	Vipers	Northampton Mens Own, Bedford Queens	
2015–16	11	Oundle	Stockwood Park	No relegation (Note: As the league was set to expand from 11 to 12 teams for the following season there was no relegation.)	
2016–17	12	Stewarts & Lloyds	Long Buckby	Aylestone St James, St Neots	
2017–18	12	St Ives (Midlands)	Vipers	Northampton Mens Own, Northampton BBOB	
2018–19	12	Leicester Forest	Northampton Casuals	Biggleswade, Birstall	
2019-20	12	Stamford	Oakham	St Neots, Northampton BBOB, Bedford Queens	
2020–21	12				
Green backgrounds are promotion places.

== Number of league titles ==
- Leicester Forest (2)
- Lutterworth (2) (Note: One of Lutterworth's titles was when league was single division known as Midlands East 2.)
- Market Harborough (2)
- Rushden & Higham (2)
- Stamford (2)
- Aylestone St James (1)
- Biggleswade (1)
- Bugbrooke (1)
- Coalville (1)
- Dunstablians (1) (Note: Dunstablians title was when league was single division known as Midlands East 2.)
- Ilkeston (1) (Note: Ilkeston's title was when league was single division known as Midlands East 2.)
- Kettering (1) (Note: Kettering's title was when league was single division known as Midlands East 2.)
- Long Buckby (1) (Note: Long Buckby's title was when league was single division known as Midlands East 2.)
- Luton (1) (Note: Luton's title was when league was single division known as Midlands East 2.)
- Market Bosworth (1) (Note: Market Bosworth's title was when league was single division known as Midlands East 2.)
- Northampton BBOB (1)
- Northampton Men's Own (1) (Note: Northampton Men's Own title was when league was single division known as Midlands East 2.)
- Oadby Wyggestonians (1)
- Oundle (1)
- St Ives (Midlands) (1)
- Stewarts & Lloyds (1)
- Vauxhall Motors (1)
- Vipers (1)

== See also ==
- Midlands RFU
- East Midlands RFU
- Leicestershire RU
- English rugby union system
- Rugby union in England
