= East Midlands/Leicestershire 4 =

Tier 13 English Rugby Union league

- Current season or competition: 1995–96 East Midlands/Leicestershire 4
- Sport: Rugby union
- Instituted: 1992; 34 years ago
- Ceased: 1996; 30 years ago
- Number of teams: 7
- Country: England
- Holders: Loughborough Students (1st title) (1995–96) (transferred to Leicestershire 1 (Note: Restructuring meant that champions Loughborough Students were transferred into East Midlands 2 instead of East Midlands/Leicestershire 3.))
- Most titles: Multiple teams (1 title)

East Midlands/Leicestershire 4 was a tier 13 English Rugby Union league with teams from Bedfordshire, parts of Cambridgeshire, Leicestershire and Northamptonshire taking part. Promoted teams moved up to East Midlands/Leicestershire 3 and there was no relegation. At the end of the 1995–96 season the division was cancelled following the splitting of the East Midlands and Leicestershire leagues.

== Original teams ==
When this division was introduced in 1992 as part of a merger of the East Midlands and Leicestershire leagues it contained the following teams:

- Braunstone Town - N/A (new to league system)
- Clapham Town - N/A (new to league system)
- Corby - transferred from East Midlands 2 (11th)
- Kempston - transferred from East Midlands 3 (2nd)
- Littlehey - transferred from East Midlands 3 (7th)
- Northampton Heathens - transferred from East Midlands 3 (4th)
- Potton - transferred from East Midlands 3 (8th)
- Thorney - transferred from East Midlands 3 (6th)
- Vauxhall Motors - transferred from East Midlands 3 (3rd)

== East Midlands/Leicestershire 4 honours ==
=== East Midlands/Leicestershire 4 (1992–1993) ===
The original East Midlands/Leicestershire 4 was a tier 12 league. Promotion was to East Midlands/Leicestershire 3 and there was no relegation.

East Midlands/Leicestershire 4
Season	No of teams	Champions	Runners–up	Relegated teams	Reference
1992–93	9	Kempston	Corby	No relegation	
Green backgrounds are the promotion places.

=== East Midlands/Leicestershire 4 (1993–1996) ===
The top six teams from Midlands 1 and the top six from North 1 were combined to create National 5 North, meaning that East Midlands/Leicestershire 4 dropped another level to become a tier 13 league. Promotion continued to East Midlands/Leicestershire 3 and there was no relegation. The division was cancelled at the end of the 1995–96 season due to the splitting of the East Midlands and Leicestershire leagues. (Note: Restructuring meant that East Midlands/Leicestershire 2, East Midlands/Leicestershire 3 and East Midlands/Leicestershire 4 were cancelled. Only East Midlands/Leicestershire 1 remained intact.)

East Midlands/Leicestershire 4
Season	No of teams	Champions	Runners–up	Relegated teams	Reference
1993–94	13	Vauxhall Motors	Northampton Heathens	No relegation	
1994–95	7	Burbage	Thorney	No relegation	
1995–96	7	Loughborough Students (Note: League restructuring caused by the cancellation of the East Midlands/Leicestershire leagues saw champions Loughborough Students transferred to Leicestershire 1.)	Cosby (Note: The splitting of the East Midlands/Leicestershire leagues meant that Cosby, Braunstone Town and Shepstead were transferred into Leicestershire 1 while Biddenham went into East Midlands. Old Wellingburians and Clapham dropped out of the leagues.)	No relegation	
Green backgrounds are the promotion places.

== Number of league titles ==
- Burbage (1)
- Kempston (1)
- Loughborough Students (1)
- Vauxhall Motors (1)

== See also ==
- East Midlands/Leicestershire 1
- East Midlands/Leicestershire 2
- East Midlands/Leicestershire 3
- Midlands RFU
- East Midlands RFU
- Leicestershire RU
- English rugby union system
- Rugby union in England
