= East Midlands/Leicestershire 2 =

English rugby union league

- Current season or competition: 1999–00 East Midlands/Leicestershire 2
- Sport: Rugby union
- Instituted: 1992; 34 years ago
- Ceased: 2000; 26 years ago
- Number of teams: 12
- Country: England
- Holders: Aylestone St James (1st title) (1999–00) (transferred to Notts, Lincs & Derbyshire/Leicestershire 1 West (Note: Restructuring meant that champions Aylestone St James were promoted to Notts, Lincs & Derbyshire/Leicestershire 1 West instead of East Midlands/Leicestershire 1.))
- Most titles: Multiple teams (1 title)

East Midlands/Leicestershire 2 was a tier 10 English Rugby Union league with teams from Bedfordshire, parts of Cambridgeshire, Leicestershire and Northamptonshire taking part. Promoted teams moved up to East Midlands/Leicestershire 1 and relegated teams dropped to East Midlands/Leicestershire 3.

The league ran for two spells between 1992–96 and 1998–00. At the end of the 1999–00 season it was cancelled for the second time following the splitting of the East Midlands and Leicestershire leagues and all teams transferred into East Midlands 1 or Notts, Lincs & Derbyshire/Leicestershire 1 West.

== Original teams ==
When this division was introduced in 1992 as part of a merger of the East Midlands and Leicestershire leagues, it contained the following teams:

- Aylestonians - transferred from Leicestershire 1 (9th)
- Bedford Queens - transferred from East Midlands 1 (8th)
- Birstall - transferred from Leicestershire 2 (runners up)
- Daventry - transferred from East Midlands 2 (runners up)
- Dunstablians - transferred from East Midlands 2 (3rd)
- New Parks Old Boys (Note: Old Boys side of New Parks Boys School.) - transferred from Leicestershire 1 (10th)
- Northampton Casuals transferred from East Midlands 1 (9th)
- Oakham - transferred from Leicestershire 2 (champions)
- Old Ashbeians (Note: Old Boys side of Ashby School. Now known as Ashby RFC.) - transferred from Leicestershire 1 (11th)
- Rushden & Higham - transferred from East Midlands 2 (champions)
- Wellingborough Old Grammarians (Note: Old Boys side of Wellingborough Grammar School.) - transferred from East Midlands 1 (11th)
- Wigston (Note: Wigston RFC would later merge with Westleigh RFC in 1998 to form Leicester Lions RFC..) - transferred from Leicestershire 1 (8th)

== East Midlands/Leicestershire 2 honours ==
=== East Midlands/Leicestershire 2 (1992–1993) ===
The original East Midlands/Leicestershire 2 was a tier 10 league. Promotion was to East Midlands/Leicestershire 1 and relegation to East Midlands/Leicestershire 3.

East Midlands/Leicestershire 2
Season	No of teams	Champions	Runners–up	Relegated teams	Reference
1992–93	12	Daventry	Dunstablians	No relegation (Note: As the division was due to increase from 12 to 13 teams there was no relegation.)	
Green backgrounds are the promotion places.

=== East Midlands/Leicestershire 2 (1993–1996) ===
The top six teams from Midlands 1 and the top six from North 1 were combined to create National 5 North, meaning that East Midlands/Leicestershire 2 dropped another level to become a tier 11 league. Promotion continued to East Midlands/Leicestershire 1 and relegation to East Midlands/Leicestershire 3. The division was cancelled at the end of the 1995–96 season due to the splitting of the East Midlands and Leicestershire leagues (Note: Restructuring meant that East Midlands/Leicestershire 2, East Midlands/Leicestershire 3 and East Midlands/Leicestershire 4 were cancelled. Only East Midlands/Leicestershire 1 remained intact.).

East Midlands/Leicestershire 2
Season	No of teams	Champions	Runners–up	Relegated teams	Reference
1993–94	13	Old Northamptonians	Bedford Queens	New Parks Old Boys	
1994–95	13	Rushden & Higham	Oakham	Wigston, Aylestonians	
1995–96	13	Bedford Swifts	Old Bosworthians (Note: League restructuring of the East Midlands/Leicestershire leagues meant that the top nine teams - Bugbrooke, St Ives, Wellingborough Old Grammarians, Brackley, Colworth House, Daventry and Old Ashbeians - were promoted into East Midlands/Leicestershire 1.)	New Parks Old Boys, Northampton Casuals, Kempston (Note: Restructuring of the East Midlands/Leicestershire leagues meant that New Parks Old Boys dropped to Leicestershire 1 while Northampton Casuals and Kempston dropped to East Midlands.)	
Green backgrounds are the promotion places.

=== East Midlands/Leicestershire 2 (1998–2000) ===
East Midlands/Leicestershire 2 returned after an absence of several seasons as a tier 10 league. Promotion was to East Midlands/Leicestershire 1 and relegation to East Midlands/Leicestershire 3. At the end of the 1999–00 campaign the league was cancelled for the second time and teams either transferred into East Midlands 1 or Notts, Lincs & Derbyshire/Leicestershire 1 West.

East Midlands/Leicestershire 2
Season	No of teams	Champions	Runners–up	Relegated teams	Reference
1998–99	12	Wellingborough Old Grammarians	Old Newtonians	Colworth House	(Note: 1998–99 East Midlands/Leicestershire 2 mistakenly referred to as East Midlands 2 on RFU website.)
1999–00	12	Aylestone St James (Note: Champions Aylestone St James were transferred to the newly introduced Notts, Lincs & Derbyshire/Leicestershire 1 West.)	Bedford Queens (Note: The cancellation of East Midlands/Leicestershire 2 meant that all teams were transferred into new divisions. Bedford Queens (2nd), Bugbrooke (3rd), Deepings (4th) and Brackley (6th) went into East Midlands 1, while Aylestonians (5th) and Ashby (8th) went into Notts, Lincs & Derbyshire/Leicestershire 2 West.)	No relegation (Note: The merger of cancellation of the East Midlands/Leicestershire leagues meant there was no relegation.)	(Note: 1999–00 East Midlands/Leicestershire 2 mistakenly referred to as East Midlands 2 on RFU website.)
Green backgrounds are the promotion places.

== Number of league titles ==
- Aylestone St James (1)
- Bedford Swifts (1)
- Daventry (1)
- Old Northamptonians (1)
- Rushden & Higham (1)
- Wellingborough Old Grammarians (1)

== See also ==
- East Midlands/Leicestershire 1
- East Midlands/Leicestershire 3
- East Midlands/Leicestershire 4
- Midlands RFU
- East Midlands RFU
- Leicestershire RU
- English rugby union system
- Rugby union in England
