= Leicestershire 2 =

Defunct English rugby union league

- Current season or competition: 1997–98 Leicestershire 2
- Sport: Rugby union
- Instituted: 1987; 39 years ago
- Ceased: 1998; 28 years ago
- Number of teams: 4
- Country: England
- Holders: Braunstone Town (1st title) (1997–98) (transferred to East Midlands/Leicestershire 3)
- Most titles: Multiple teams (1 title)
- Website: Leicestershire RU

Leicestershire 2 was a tier 11 English Rugby Union league with teams from Leicestershire taking part. Promoted teams moved up to Leicestershire 1 and there was no relegation. The league ran for two spells between 1987–1992 and 1996–1998 before it was permanently cancelled and all teams transferred into East Midlands/Leicestershire 3.

== Original teams ==
When league rugby began in 1987, this division contained the following teams:

- Antsey
- Aylestonians
- Birstall Community College (Note: Birstall Community College would be renamed as Birstall RFC.)
- Burbage
- New Parks Old Boys (Note: Old Boys side of New Parks Boys School.)
- Oakham

== Leicestershire 2 honours ==
=== Leicestershire 2 (1987–1992) ===
The original Leicestershire 2 was a tier 9 league. Promotion was to Leicestershire 1 and there was no relegation. At the end of the 1991–92 season all of the East Midlands and Leicestershire leagues were merged and the majority of sides in Leicestershire 2 transferred to the new East Midlands/Leicestershire 3. (Note: East Midlands/Leicestershire 3 was mostly formed of teams from East Midlands 2, East Midlands 3 and Leicestershire 2)

Leicestershire 2
Season	No of teams	Champions	Runners–up	Relegated teams	Reference
1987–88	6	New Parks Old Boys	Aylestonians	No relegation	
1988–89	8	Old Newtonians	Birstall Community College	No relegation	
1989–90	10	Old Ashbeians	New Parks Old Boys	No relegation	
1990–91	9	Aylestonians	Melton Mowbray	No relegation	
1991–92	7	Oakham (Note: Restructuring meant that champions Oakham would be transferred into the new East Midlands/Leicestershire 2.)	Birstall (Note: Runners up Birstall would also be transferred into East Midlands/Leicestershire 2. The remainining clubs in the division would go into East Midlands/Leicestershire 3.)	No relegation	
Green backgrounds are promotion places.

=== Leicestershire 2 (1996-1998) ===
After an absence of four seasons Leicestershire 2 was reintroduced, this time sitting at tier 11 of the league system. Promotion was to Leicestershire 1 and there was no relegation. Remerging of all the East Midlands and Leicestershire leagues meant that Leicestershire 2 was cancelled at the end of the 1997–98 season and all teams transferred into East Midlands/Leicestershire 3.

Leicestershire 2
Season	No of teams	Champions	Runners–up	Relegated teams	Reference
1996–97	5	Burbage	Braunstone Town	No relegation	
1997–98	4	Braunstone Town (Note: Restructuring caused by the remerging of the East Midlands and Leicestershire leagues meant that champions Braunstone Town were transferred into East Midlands/Leicestershire 3.)	Anstey (Note: Restructuring meant that all clubs in the division, including runners up Anstey, Aylestone Athletic and Cosby would be transferred into East Midlands/Leicestershire 3.)	No relegation	
Green backgrounds are the promotion places.

== Number of league titles ==
- Aylestonians (1)
- Braunstone Town (1)
- Burbage (1)
- New Parks Old Boys (1)
- Oakham (1)
- Old Ashbeians (1)
- Old Newtonians (1)

== See also ==
- Leicestershire 1
- Midlands RFU
- Leicestershire RU
- English rugby union system
- Rugby union in England
