= 2003 Barbarians end of season tour =

Summary
P	W	D	L
Total
4	4	0	0
Test match
3	3	0	0
Opponent
P	W	D	L
England XV
1	1	0	0
Scotland XV
1	1	0	0
Wales XV
1	1	0	0

The 2003 Barbarians end of season tour was a series of matches played in May–June 2003 in Scotland, Wales and England by Barbarian F.C.

== Results ==
21 May 2003

East Midlands	26–52	Barbarians

Northampton

25 May 2003

England XV	36–49	Barbarians

Twickenham Stadium, London

28 May 2003

Scotland XV	15–24	Barbarians

Murrayfield Stadium, Edinburgh

31 May 2003

Wales XV	35–48	Barbarians

Millennium Stadium, Cardiff
