= Leicestershire 1 =

Rugby union league in England, 1987–1998

- Current season or competition: 1997–98 Leicestershire 1
- Sport: Rugby union
- Instituted: 1987; 39 years ago
- Ceased: 1998; 28 years ago
- Number of teams: 5
- Country: England
- Holders: Wigston (1997–98) (N/A (Note: Champions Wigston RFC would merge with Westleigh RFC to form Leicester Lions RFC - playing five levels higher in Midlands 1.))
- Most titles: Multiple teams (1 title)
- Website: Leicestershire RU

Leicestershire 1 was a tier 10 English Rugby Union league with teams from Leicestershire taking part. Promoted teams moved up to East Midlands/Leicestershire 1 and relegated teams dropped to Leicestershire 2. The league ran for two spells between 1987–1992 and 1996–1998 before it was permanently cancelled and the majority of teams transferred into either East Midlands/Leicestershire 1 or East Midlands/Leicestershire 2.

== Original teams ==
When league rugby began in 1987, this division contained the following teams:

- Belgrave
- Coalville
- Kibworth (Note: Kibworth RFC would later be renamed as Market Harborough RUFC in 2006.)
- Lutterworth
- Market Bosworth
- Old Ashbeians (Note: Old Boys side of Ashby School. Now known as Ashby RFC.)
- Old Bosworthians (Note: Old Bosworthians RFC would later merge with West Leicester in 1997 to form Leicester Forest RFC.)
- Old Newtonians
- West Leicester (Note: West Leicester RFC would later merge with Old Bosworthians in 1997 to form Leicester Forest RFC.)

== Leicestershire 1 honours ==
=== Leicestershire 1 (1987–1992) ===
The original Leicestershire 1 was a tier 8 league. Promotion was to East Midlands/Leicestershire and relegation to Leicestershire 2. At the end of the 1991–92 season all of the East Midlands and Leicestershire leagues were merged and most sides in Leicestershire 1 transferred to the new East Midlands/Leicestershire 1. (Note: East Midlands/Leicestershire 1 was mostly formed of teams from East Midlands 1 and Leicestershire 1)

Leicestershire 1
Season	No of teams	Champions	Runners–up	Relegated teams	Reference
1987–88	9	Belgrave	Coalville	Old Newtonians, Old Ashbeians	
1988–89	10	Lutterworth	Market Bosworth	New Parks Old Boys, Aylestonians	
1989–90	11	Coalville	Old Bosworthians	West Leicester, Old Newtonians, Melton Mowbray	
1990–91	11	Hinckley	Old Bosworthians	Birstall	
1991–92	11	South Leicester (Note: Restructuring of the Midlands leagues saw champions South Leicester promoted two levels up into the newly introduced Midlands East 2.)	Kibworth (Note: Restructuring saw clubs ranked 2nd to 7th, including Kibworth, Market Bosworth, Old Bosworthians, Oadby Wyggestonian, Loughborough and Melton Mowbray promoted up into the newlook East Midlands/Leicestershire 1. All other clubs would be transferred into the newly introduced East Midlands/Leicestershire 2.)	No relegation (Note: The merging of the East Midlands and Leicestershire leagues meant there was no relegation.)	
Green backgrounds are promotion places.

=== Leicestershire 1 (1996-1998) ===
After an absence of four seasons Leicestershire 1 was reintroduced, this time sitting at tier 10 of the league system. Promotion was to East Midlands/Leicestershire 1 and there was no relegation. Remerging of all the East Midlands and Leicestershire leagues meant that Leicestershire 1 was cancelled at the end of the 1997–98 season and the majority of teams transferred into East Midlands/Leicestershire 2.

Leicestershire 1
Season	No of teams	Champions	Runners–up	Relegated teams	Reference
1996–97	6	Loughborough Students	Wigston	No relegation (Note: There was no relegation as West Leicester would merge with Old Bosworthians the following season to form Leicester Forest RFC, playing in East Midlands/Leicestershire 1.)	
1997–98	5	Wigston (Note: Champions Wigston would merge with West Leicester to form Leicester Lions RFC, playing in Midlands 1.)	Old Newtonians (Note: Runners up Old Newtonians would be transferred to East Midlands/Leicestershire 2, while Aylestonians and Burbage would go into East Midlands/Leicestershire 3. New Parks Old Boys would drop out of the leagues.)	No relegation (Note: The cancellation of Leicestershire 1 meant that there was no relegation.)	
Green backgrounds are the promotion places.

== Number of league titles ==
- Belgrave (1)
- Coalville (1)
- Hinckley (1)
- Loughborough Students (1)
- Lutterworth (1)
- South Leicester (1)
- Wigston (1)

== See also ==
- Leicestershire 2
- Midlands RFU
- Leicestershire RU
- English rugby union system
- Rugby union in England
