= Leicestershire County Cup =

Rugby union competition in England

- Sport: Rugby Union
- Instituted: 1890; 136 years ago
- Country: England
- Holders: Syston (9th title) (2018–19)
- Most titles: Syston (9 titles)
- Website: Leicestershire RFU

The Leicestershire County Cup is an annual rugby union knock-out club competition organized by the Leicestershire Rugby Union. It was first introduced in 1890 with the inaugural winners being South Wigston. The competition was known as the Leicestershire League Cup until 1893 when it was changed to Leicestershire Senior Cup. The first competition was open to the top sides in the county apart from the Leicester FC first XV, who were considered too strong and would instead enter an 'A' team up until 1906. Smaller clubs in the county, as well as senior club second sides, played in the Leicestershire Junior Cup which had its inaugural competition three seasons earlier in 1887.

The Senior Cup was discontinued after the 1926-27 season as it lost its appeal with the clubs involved. Clubs would instead take part in the LRU 7-a-side competition which was introduced for the following year. Rather confusingly the winners of this competition would be rewarded with the Rolleston Charity Cup - another Leicestershire club competition, also discontinued that year - while the runners up would receive the Senior Cup. This seven-a-side competition would continue until 1979.

A proper 15-a-side county cup competition would not be introduced until the 1970-71 season when a format was recommended by Westleigh Rugby Club - a parent club of Leicester Lions. This new competition was first known as the 'Westleigh Cup' and was won by Stoneygate. The following season the cup would be known by its present name, the Leicestershire County Cup and up until the 2004-05 season would be a qualification method for clubs in the county for the English National Cup competition (now Anglo-Welsh Cup).

The Leicestershire County Cup is currently the premier county cup competition for club sides based in Leicestershire that typically play in tier 5 (National League 3 Midlands) to tier 7 (Midlands 2 East (North)/Midlands 2 East (South)) of the English rugby union league system - although teams in lower ranked regional leagues have also taken part. The current format is a knock-out competition with a first round, quarter finals, semi finals (held at neutral venues) and final (held at Welford Road). There is also a Leicestershire Bowl competition for lower ranked clubs (tier 8 and below) that are not taking part in the County Cup.

== Leicestershire County Cup winners ==
Leicestershire County Cup Finals
Season	Winner	Score	Runners–up	Venue
1889-90	South Wigston			
1890-91	Leicester Swifts			
1891-92	Leicester Crusaders			
1892-93	Leicester Crusaders			
1893-94	Burfield Rangers			
1894-95	Leicester A			
1895-96	Leicester A			
1896-97	Belgrave St Peters		Leicester A	
1897-98	Leicester A			
1898-99	Leicester A			
1899-1900	Stoneygate			
1900-01	South Wigston			
1901-02	Leicester A			
1902-03	Belgrave			
1903-04	Granville			
1904-05	Lutterworth			
1905-06	Belgrave			
1906-07	Belgrave			
1907-08	Oadby			
1908-09	Medway Athletic			
1909-10	Oadby			
1910-11	Belgrave Premier Works			
1911-12	Syston Street Old Boys			
1913-20	No competition due to World War I			
1920-21	Belgrave			
1921-22	Aylestone St James			
1922-23	Aylestone St James			
1923-24	Oadby			
1924-25	Belgrave			
1925-26	Belgrave			
1926-27	Belgrave			
1928-69	No competition			
1970-71	Stoneygate		Wigston	
1971-72	Hinckley			
1972-73	Hinckley		Wigston	
1973-74	Wigston		Loughborough (Note: The Leicestershire RFU 1887-1987 book states that Loughborough RFC were losing county club finalists on two occasions - 1973 and 1980. However, in the same book, Wigston RFC are said to have been losing finalists in 1973. It is likely that the year has been confused so I have used the 1973-74 season for Loughborough's first cup final appearance.)	
1974-75	Westleigh		Wigston	
1975-76	Westleigh			
1976-77	Hinckley		Wigston	
1977-78	Loughborough Students		Wigston	
1978-79	Hinckley			
1979-80	Westleigh		Loughborough	
1980-81	Westleigh		Oadby Wyggestonians	
1981-82	Hinckley			
1982-83	Vipers			
1983-84	Loughborough Students		Stonegate	
1984-85	Loughborough Students			
1985-86	Syston		Wigston	
1986-87	Stoneygate		Hinckley	Welford Road, Leicester
1988-89	Vipers	12-6	Stoneygate	Welford Road, Leicester
1989-90	Syston			
1990-91	Loughborough Students			
1991-92	Vipers		Hinckley	
1992-93	Syston			
1993-94	Loughborough Students			
1994-95	Syston			
1995-96	Westleigh			
1996-97	Syston		Hinckley	Welford Road, Leicester
1997-98	Hinckley		Belgrave	Welford Road, Leicester
1998-99	Loughborough Students		Belgrave	
1999-2000	Leicester Lions			
2000-01	Leicester Lions			
2001-02	South Leicester		Syston	Welford Road, Leicester
2002-03	N/A (Note: Loughborough Students were initially declared winners after beating Market Bosworth 37-23 at Welford Road. However they were later found to have fielded an ineligible player and would be stripped of the title. Market Bosworth would replace them in the 2003–04 Powergen Cup.)	N/A	N/A	Welford Road, Leicester
2003-04	Leicester Lions		Hinckley	Welford Road, Leicester
2004-05	Market Bosworth	10-6	Leicester Lions	Welford Road, Leicester
2005-06	Loughborough Students			
2006-07	Hinckley		South Leicester	
2007-08	South Leicester	20-18	Loughborough Students	Welford Road, Leicester
2008-09	South Leicester	10-9	Hinckley	Northampton Road, Market Harborough
2009-10	Syston	30-15	South Leicester	Welford Road, Leicester
2010-11	South Leicester	26-20	Syston	Welford Road, Leicester
2011-12	South Leicester	47-29	Syston	Welford Road, Leicester
2012-13	Hinckley	24-5	Lutterworth	Welford Road, Leicester
2013-14	South Leicester	59-30	Lutterworth	Welford Road, Leicester
2014-15	South Leicester	34-27	Syston	Welford Road, Leicester
2015-16	Melton Mowbray	20-18	Hinckley	Welford Road, Leicester
2016-17	Melton Mowbray	17-16	Syston	Welford Road, Leicester
2017-18	Syston	73-12	Belgrave	Welford Road, Leicester
2018-19	Syston	33-27	Oadby Wyggestonians	Welford Road, Leicester
2019-20				

== Number of wins ==
- Syston (9) (Note: Syston RFC results also include 1912 win by Syston Street Old Boys who were an earlier incarnation of the club.)
- Hinckley (8)
- Loughborough Students (7)
- South Leicester (7)
- Belgrave (5) (Note: Belgrave RFC results also include 1887 win by Belgrave St Peters who were an earlier name for the club.)
- Westleigh (5)
- Leicester A (5)
- Leicester Lions (3) (Note: If you include wins by Wigston and Westleigh - clubs that merged to form the modern Leicester Lions - then the Lions have 9 wins overall.)
- Oadby Wyggestonian (3) (Note: Oadby would later merge with Old Wygestonians to form Oadby Wygestonians in 1971.)
- Stoneygate (3)
- Vipers (3)
- Aylestone St James (2)
- Leicester Crusaders (2)
- Melton Mowbray (2)
- South Wigston (2)
- Belgrave Premier Works (1)
- Burfield Rangers (1)
- Granville (1)
- Leicester Swifts (1)
- Lutterworth (1)
- Market Bosworth (1)
- Medway Athletic (1)
- Wigston (1)

== See also ==
- Leicestershire RU
- English rugby union system
- Rugby union in England
