= Hunts & Peterborough County Rugby Union =

Hunts and Peterborough County Rugby Union is an amalgamation of Rugby Union teams from around Peterborough and Huntingdonshire.

It is a sub-county of the East Midlands Rugby Football Union and holds its own county cup each season.

Playing colours: Red, green, yellow & blue hoops.

== Member teams ==
- Deepings RUFC
- Huntingdon RFC
- Peterborough Lions RFC
- St Ives RFC
- St. Neots RUFC
- Thorney RUFC
- Westwood RUFC

== Representative teams ==
Hunts & Peterborough County Rugby Union has representative teams at U13, U14, U15 and U16 levels and these teams play matches against other counties in the East Midlands Rugby Union jurisdiction.

== County Cup draw ==
Round One (by 1 Oct 2013)
Thorney	18
Deepings	05
St Neots	31
Peterborough RFC	10
TBA RUFC
TBA RUFC
TBA RUFC
TBA RUFC

Semifinals (by 1 Feb 2014)
Thorney	20
Peterborough RFC	15

Final (by 30 Apr 2014)
Thorney	41
Huntingdon	7

== Past Cup Champions ==
2012/13 season - St Ives RFC 12 April 2013 Deepings (21) V (24) St Ives

2011/12 season -

2010/11 season -

2009/10 season -

2008/09 season -

2007/08 season - Peterborough Lions 2 February 2008 Peterborough Lions (18) v (12) Deepings
