= Luton RFC =

English rugby union club, based in Luton, Bedfordshire

(England) Luton Rugby Club
- Full name: Luton Rugby Football Club
- Union: East Midlands RFU
- Nickname: Lutonians
- Founded: 1930; 96 years ago
- Location: Luton, England
- Ground: Newlands Road
- Chairman: (England) Mick Geraghty
- President: (England) Sean McShane
- Coach(es): (England) Ben Nutley, Steve Ellis
- Captain: (England) Luke Spellen
- League: London 2 North West
- 2019–20: 14th (relegated to London 3 North West)

Official website
- www.lutonrugby.com

Luton Rugby Football Club are a Bedfordshire-based English rugby union team who currently play their rugby in London 2 North West following their relegation from London 1 North at the end of the 2018–19 season. Their ground is located by the M1 motorway just outside Stockwood Park and is called Newlands Road.

The growing club enjoys numerous local rivalries, most notably with Dunstablians. The 1st XV is managed by Steve Evans and coached by Steve Ellis and Ben Nutley. The 2nd XV is managed by Steve Haynes and Coached by Andrew Kelly, Dicky Jones and Lee Mills.

== Current Development XV Squad ==
Alistair Taylor (Prop), Ryan Duffy (Prop), David Jones (Prop), Wayne Hemson (Hooker), Matt McClurg (Back Row), Ryan Sheppard (Back Row) Charlie Wallington (Lock), Steve Sharpe (Lock), Connor Sibley (Lock/Back Row) Harry Smith (Back Row), Ryan Rosser (Back Row), Patrick Fraser (Back Row), Rhys Thomas (Back Row), Ross Geraghty (Scrum Half), Lewis Mayhew (Scrum Half) Olly Haynes (Fly Half) Dean Shaun Paul (Hooker) Ollie Woolsey (Centre), Mark Gareth Hunt (Centre) Shane Thomas (Wing), Thomas Bains (Wing) Dicky Jones (Full Back), Paul Read (Wing)

== History ==
The club held its first season in 1931/32.

== Club Honours ==
- East Midlands/Leicestershire 1 champions: 1996–97
- Midlands East 2 champions: 1998–99
- Midlands 2 (east v west) promotion playoff winners: 2002–03
- Midlands Division 2 East champions: 2004–05
- Midlands Division 1 champions: 2006–07
- Midlands 2 East (north v south) promotion playoff winners: 2017–18
