= East Midlands 3 =

Defunct English rugby union league

- Current season or competition: 1991–92 East Midlands 3
- Sport: Rugby union
- Instituted: 1987; 39 years ago
- Ceased: 1992; 34 years ago
- Number of teams: 8
- Country: England
- Holders: Westwood (1991–92) (transferred to East Midlands/South Leicestershire 3 (Note: Champions Westwood would typically have moved up into East Midlands 2 but the cancellation of the East Midlands leagues meant they went into the new East Midlands/South Leicestershire 3 instead.))
- Most titles: Multiple teams (1 title)
- Website: East Midlands RFU

East Midlands 3 was a tier 10 English Rugby Union league with teams from Bedfordshire, Northamptonshire and parts of Cambridgeshire taking part. Promoted teams moved up to East Midlands 2 and there was no relegation. At the end of the 1991–92 season the division was cancelled due to the merging of all of the East Midlands and Leicestershire leagues, and the majority of teams transferred into the new East Midlands/Leicestershire 3 (Note: Despite its name East Midlands/Leicestershire 3 was mostly formed of teams from East Midlands 3.)

== Original teams ==
When league rugby was introduced in 1987 this division contained the following teams:

- Bedford Queens
- Bedford Swifts
- Bretton
- Bugbrooke
- Northampton Heathens
- Potton
- RAE Bedford
- Ramsey (Midlands)
- Westwood (Note: Westwood RUFC would later by renamed as Peterborough Lions RFC in 2005.)

== East Midlands 3 honours ==
East Midlands 3
Season	No of teams	Champions	Runners–up	Relegated teams	Reference
1987–88	9	Bedford Queens	Westwood	No relegation	
1988–89	6	Bedford Swifts	Deepings	No relegation	
1989–90	6	Bugbrooke	Bedfordshire Police	No relegation	
1990–91	6	Deepings	Wellingburians	No relegation	
1991–92	8	Westwood (Note: Restructuring of the East Midlands and Leicestershire leagues meant that Westwood were transferred to the new East Midlands/Leicestershire 3.)	Kempston (Note: Due to the cancellation of East Midlands 3 all clubs were transferred into the new East Midlands/Leicestershire 3 apart from RAE Bedford who dropped out of the leagues.)	No relegation	
Green backgrounds are promotion places.

== Number of league titles ==
- Bedford Queens (1)
- Bedford Swifts (1)
- Bugbrooke (1)
- Deepings (1)
- Westwood (1)

== See also ==
- East Midlands 1
- East Midlands 2
- Midlands RFU
- East Midlands RFU
- English rugby union system
- Rugby union in England
