= Hinckley RFC =

English rugby union club, based in Leicestershire

(England) Hinckley
- Full name: Hinckley Rugby Football Club
- Union: Leicestershire RU
- Nickname: Hornets
- Founded: 1893; 133 years ago
- Location: Hinckley, Leicestershire, England
- Ground: Leicester Road
- Chairman: John Tilley
- President: Roger Edwards
- Captain: Rory Vowles
- League: National League 2 West
- 2025–26: 3rd
Team kit

Official website
- www.hinckleyrugby.co.uk

Hinckley Rugby Club is an English rugby union team based in Hinckley, Leicestershire. The club runs six senior sides, a ladies team and a full set of junior teams (including a girls only section). The first XV currently play in National League 2 West, a fourth tier league in the English rugby union system.

== History ==
Hinckley Rugby Club was formed in 1892 with the first matches being played the following year. As with many clubs, Hinckley moved regularly during the early years of the 20th-century before moving to Coventry Road in 1929 and to its current Leicester Road location just under forty years later. After a strong 1970s, the 1980s were unkind to Hinckley and when the league system was formed the club suffered three consecutive relegations. However, fortunes improved in the 1990s and they started to move back up the rugby hierarchy and reached the National leagues by the end of the 1990s.

== Honours ==
- Leicestershire County Cup winners (8): 1971–72, 1972–73, 1976–77, 1978–79, 1981–82, 1997–98, 2006–07, 2012–13
- Leicestershire 1 champions: 1990–91
- East Midlands/Leicestershire 1 champions: 1991–92
- Midlands East 1 champions: 1993–94
- Midlands 1 champions: 1996–97
- Midlands Division 2 East champions: 2001–02
- Midlands 2 (east v west) promotion play-off winner: 2007–08
- National League 3 (north v midlands) promotion play-off winner: 2015–16

== Current standings ==
2026–27 National League 2 West table
Pos	Team	Pld	W	D	L	PF	PA	PD	TB	LB	Pts	Qualification
1	Redruth	6	6	0	0	265	121	+144	5	0	29	Promotion place
2	Taunton Titans	6	5	0	1	264	132	+132	5	1	26	Promotion play-off
3	Hinckley	6	5	0	1	253	108	+145	5	0	25	
4	Luctonians	6	5	0	1	198	129	+69	5	0	25	
5	Clifton	6	5	0	1	240	189	+51	5	0	25	
6	Lymm	6	4	0	2	198	202	−4	5	1	22	
7	Old Redcliffians	6	3	0	3	194	188	+6	5	1	18	
8	Cinderford	6	3	0	3	222	250	−28	5	0	17	
9	Loughborough Students	6	2	0	4	197	236	−39	5	1	14	
10	Hornets	6	1	0	5	180	200	−20	4	4	12	
11	Barnstaple	6	2	0	4	139	174	−35	2	1	11	
12	Bournville	6	1	0	5	212	348	−136	5	1	10	Relegation play-off
13	Devonport Services	6	0	0	6	145	294	−149	3	1	4	Relegation place
14	Exeter University	6	0	0	6	140	276	−136	2	0	2	Relegation place

Updated to match(es) played on 5 September 2026. Source: National League Rugby
Rules for classification: If teams are level at any stage, tiebreakers are applied in the following order:
1. Number of matches won
2. Number of matches drawn
3. Difference between points for and against
4. Total number of points for
5. Aggregate number of points scored in matches between tied teams
6. Number of matches won excluding the first match, then the second and so on until the tie is settled
