= Rayner Stephens High School =

Location
- Yew Tree Lane; Dukinfield; Cheshire, SK16 5BL; England
- Coordinates: 53.46968°N 2.07117°W

Information
- Type: Academy
- Local authority: Tameside Council
- Department for Education URN: 148430 Tables
- Ofsted: Reports
- Head Teacher: Martin Davies
- Gender: Coeducational
- Age: 11 to 16
- Website: https://www.raynerstephens.org.uk/

Rayner Stephens High School (formally Astley Sports College and Community High School) is a coeducational secondary school located in Dukinfield in the English county of Greater Manchester.

It was a community school administered by Tameside Metropolitan Borough Council and previously gained Sports College status. In July 2017 the school converted to academy status and was renamed after Rayner Stephens.

The school mainly admits pupils from Broadbent Fold Primary School, Oakfield Primary School, Ravensfield Community Primary School and Yew Tree Community Primary School. The school has and has artificial multi-sports pitches, which can be reserved for use by the general public, outside school hours.

The school offers GCSEs and BTECs as programmes of study for pupils. The school also offers the Duke of Edinburgh's Award programme.
