= Bedford Athletic =

English rugby union club, based in Bedford

- Full name: Bedford Athletic Rugby Club
- Union: East Midlands RFU
- Nickname: Ath
- Founded: 1908; 118 years ago
- Ground: Putnoe Woods (Capacity: 500)
- Chairman: Richard Parrish
- President: Mike Cox
- Coach(es): Andy Philips, Stuart Polson
- League: Regional 2 East Midlands
- 2025–26: 4th
1st kit	2nd kit

Official website
- bedfordathleticrfc.co.uk

Bedford Athletic Rugby Club is a rugby union team based in Bedford, in the county of Bedfordshire. The club currently play in the sixth tier of the English rugby union system, participating in Regional 2 East Midlands after being relegated from Regional 1 South East at the end of the 2024–25 season. The club runs two senior sides, a veterans team and a colts team. There is currently no junior section at Bedford Athletic.

== History ==
The club was founded on 16 April 1908 and has used many grounds in the town. The first was in Kimbolton Road opposite the Park Hotel. The second in Bedford Park by the lake, the third behind the Fox & Hounds PH in Goldington Road, 'where a pond encroached on the pitch in which stood the corner flag'. Many other grounds were used but the move in 1924 to Newnham Lane, now known as Newnham Avenue, was a significant one for the club stayed there, apart from the war years, until 1970.

The club has always been prepared to work hard to provide its facilities, which it has then invited the public to share. In 1933, during the depression, the then Secretary, Captain E.H.G.Chambers raised funds and under his guidance, some unemployed, mainly ex-servicemen levelled the whole of the area which now contains municipal playing fields and the Athletics Stadium. It was because of these efforts that Bedford Corporation gave the club priority over the use of these grounds. During the war the changing room at the north-east corner of the field suffered badly and, until Murketts garage was built, a redundant fire service hut at the corner of Barkers Lane became the HQ. The club then moved the hut to where the fire station now stands.

The Council took pity on the Ath when the County Fire Service took over the site and the club were offered the lease on the land that it now occupies. This is green belt land adjacent to the town boundary. The Ath's nearest neighbours lived in a pair of cottages opposite where the Bluebell pub now stands. Undeterred by the fact that it was over a half a mile down a track with no services, club members set to and levelled, drained and seeded the pitches and like the 1930s members overcame all obstacles and eventually built the clubhouse seen today.

The facilities are frequently used by local societies, have been used as a play school, by Bedfordshire Schools, dog shows, archery, ladies rugby and most Sundays during the season, hundreds of boys use the ground for Mini Rugby. During the summer the club previously entered a side in the Beds & District Cricket League, which in recent years have been rather successful and in season 2006 the Ath won the Second Division. However new tenants are now in place as Bedford Tigers Rugby League share the ground over the summer months.

Bedford Athletic won the first ever Bedfordshire Cup competition in season 1971–72 defeating Colmworth House in the final. The same year the club progressed to the East Midlands Cup Final at Franklins Gardens although this time without success losing out to Rushden. Bedford Athletic competed in the first four finals of the Bedfordshire Cup winning the trophy again in 1975. Success in the East Midlands Cup had to wait until 1983 when that Trophy was carried off for the first time with a victory over Peterborough.

When the leagues began in season 1987–88 the Ath were placed in the East Midlands/Leicestershire league and for the first few seasons finished steadily in mid table, until in 1991 having won 8 and lost 2 league games the club finished top of the table. The club then settled comfortably in Midlands Two for seven consecutive seasons before the historic season of 1997–98. In this season not only did the club go undefeated they won a grand slam of titles including the RFU Intermediate Cup Final at Twickenham when Stroud were defeated 29–24. Both the Bedfordshire Cup and East Midlands Cup titles were captured and the Midlands Two league conquered as the first team won all 16 league matches achieving the club's highest season points total of 1,503. Nothing could really top that season but the following campaign nearly did, as the Bedfordshire and East Midlands Cups were captured once again and the Midlands One league title secured at the first attempt, however this time with one defeat.

With the new Millennium came the new experience of playing National League rugby and the first team competed in National Three North for four consecutive seasons before being relegated due to the "cascade" effect in 2003 – which was the previous RFU device for rebalancing leagues on a regional basis. Thus the Ath found themselves back in Midlands One for the 2003–04 season. This proved to be no bad thing as the Ath were able to secure a loan from the RFU to enable the extension and refurbishment of the clubhouse. This was completed by the end of the 2004–05 season by which time the club were back in the National Leagues having won Midlands One at the first attempt. However 6 wins from 26 matches was an inadequate return and for the third season in a row the Ath changed leagues back to Midlands One.

A titanic struggle for promotion in season 2005–06 saw the Ath eventually finish second to Rugby Lions despite only losing three matches and then lose the promotion play-off in extra time to West Park St. Helens 24–17. In 2006–07 despite doing the double over league champions Luton, Ath found themselves dragged into a relegation battle. Eventually Ath won two of their last three games and drew the final fixture at home to Scunthorpe to ensure survival, albeit on points difference. This was a freakish league season as ten wins and one draw out of twenty-two matches would normally deliver a comfortable mid-table position.

In its centenary season the club once again experienced mixed fortunes with a last day victory at Scunthorpe securing survival. The Colts XV beat Ampthill 14–13 in the Bedfordshire Cup Final. The centenary season ended with a celebration game against a Penguin International XV which featured players such as Scottish International Craig Joiner and Bedford Blues stalwarts Matt Allen and Jon Phillips. Although the Ath went down 67–41 the match was a tribute to the fun and enjoyment that the club has provided to its members in its first 100 years.

Since the Centenary season the club has faced something of a struggle as it looks to re-establish itself amongst its peers in the East Midlands. In season 2008–09, four victories out of 22 meant a bottom-placed finish in Midlands One. However a tremendous fightback in a final day 36–31 victory over Malvern ensured that under the RFU league re-organisation the club retained its status in the new National 3 Midlands. This however proved to be something of a brief escape as the club lost all 26 league games in season 2009–10 and returned to level 6 rugby in Midlands One East where it very nearly escaped 12 months previously. The season was not all negative as a revived Colts team led by Duncan Woodhead and Dave Albone reached the quarter-finals of the National Colts Cup, losing to eventual winners Bedford Blues. They also became East Midlands champions for the first time ever, defeating Leighton Buzzard 31–29 in the league final.

This young squad, together with new coaches Rowland Winter and Oli Joisce, contributed to the team's development in subsequent seasons.

Following two mid-table finishes in Midlands One East, the 2012–13 season saw the club secure the league title with a 25–24 victory at home to title rivals Peterborough Lionson the final day. With only one defeat from Christmas onwards, the team had surpassed all their opponents by Easter to return to National 3 Midlands. The season also saw the revitalisation of the Colts side under Chris O'Dell, and the new "Bedford Athletic Blues" Colts became Herts Middlesex Development League Champions and Bedfordshire Cup winners. They also finished runner-up to Wellingborough in both East Midlands League and Cup competitions, giving fans room to believe that the club has greatly improved over the past few years.

During the 2013–14 season, the club won only one game and was relegated to Midlands One East. Following a season of consolidation in which the club competed near the top of the league, the 2015–16 season resulted in promotion after losing only two games all season, alongside a victory in the East Midlands Cup Final. In the 2018–19 season, players Harry Sawford-Smith and Leo Mortimer helped propel the team to a sixth-place finish in London Premier.

== Honours ==
- East Midlands/Leicestershire 1 champions: 1990–91
- Midlands 1 East champions (4): 1997–98 (Note: 1997–98 title was when league was known as Midlands 2.), 2012–13, 2015–16, 2017–18
- RFU Intermediate Cup winners: 1997–98
- Midlands Division 1 champions (2): 1998–99, 2003–04
- East Midlands Cup winners (3): 2015–16, 2017–18, 2018–19
- Bedfordshire Cup Winners (3): 2016–17, 2017–18, 2018–19
