= St Neots RUFC =

English rugby union club, based in St Neots, Cambridgeshire

- Full name: St Neots Rugby Union Football Club
- Union: East Midlands RFU
- Nickname(s): Saints, Blues
- Founded: 1964; 62 years ago
- Ground(s): The Common; St Neots; Cambridgeshire; PE19 1HA
- Chairman: (England) Wayne Huttly
- President: (England) Dave Christy
- Director of Rugby: (Scotland) Steve Gibson
- Coach(es): (England) Mick Cleary (Scotland) Steve Gibson (England) Paul Wakefield
- Captain(s): Club Captain (England) Nick Ashford 1st XV Captain (England) Ross Hubbard 2nd XV Captain (England) Will Smith Vets Captain (England) Pete Arnold Ladies Captain (England) Beth Robinson
- League: Midlands 3 East (South)
- 2019–20: 12th (relegated to Midlands 4 East (South))
1st kit	2nd kit

Official website
- www.stneotsrugbyclub.com

St Neots RUFC is a Rugby Union Football Club based in St Neots, Cambridgeshire, England.

== History ==
A rugby union club appeared briefly in St Neots between 1938–39 but was halted due to the outbreak of World War II. It was not until a quarter of a century later than another club would appear, with St Neots RUFC officially being formed in 1964 at the New Inn. The first chairman was the pub landlord at the New Inn, Tom Curry, and the first captain Peter Ellis.

The team played for East Midlands 2 during the 1988-1989 rugby season.

== Club honours ==
- East Midlands 2 champions: 1989–90
- Midlands 5 East (South) champions: 2008–09
- Midlands 4 East (South) champions (2): 2014-15, 2017–18

== See also ==
- East Midlands RFU
