= South Leicester RFC =

South Leicester
- Full name: South Leicester Rugby Football Club
- Union: Leicestershire RU
- Founded: 1919; 106 years ago
- Location: Wigston, Leicestershire, England
- Ground(s): Welford Road Ground
- Chairman: Wayne Marsden
- President: Graham Hill
- Coach(es): Steve Baker
- League(s): Midlands 4 East(S)
- 2020-21: ?
Team kit

Official website
- www.pitchero.com/clubs/southleicester

South Leicester Rugby Football Club is an English rugby union club based in Wigston, Leicestershire - just south of Leicester. The club runs two senior sides, plus a colts side and a full set of junior teams. The first XV were playing in the Midlands Premier, the fifth tier of the English rugby union system, following their relegation from National League 2 North at the end of the 2018–19 season, however, due to a run of bad results and a number of players leaving the club, they have withdrawn from the Midlands Premier.

== History ==
South Leicester Rugby Club was formed in 1919. A history of the early years of the club can be found on the club's website

== Honours ==
- Leicestershire 1 champions: 1991–92
- Leicestershire County Cup winners (7): 2001–02, 2007–08, 2008–09, 2010–11, 2011–12, 2013–14, 2014–15
- Midlands 3 East (South) champions: 2001–02
- Midlands Division 2 East champions: 2005–06
- National League 3 Midlands champions: 2014–15
