= Thorney RUFC =

English rugby union club, based in Thorney, Cambridgeshire

(England) Thorney
- Full name: Thorney Rugby Union Football Club
- Union: East Midlands RFU
- Founded: 1990; 36 years ago
- Location: Thorney, England
- Ground: Ron Jacobs Memorial Playing Field
- Chairman: Duncan Davies
- League: Eastern Counties Greene King Division One West
- 2023–24: 2nd

Official website
- thorneyrufc.rfu.club

Thorney Rugby Club is a Rugby union club based near Peterborough which was formed in 1990.

== Ron Jacobs Playing Field ==
The club's ground is named after former RFU Chairman and England International Ron Jacobs who lived in Thorney in his later years. The ground has 3 pitches of which one is floodlit.

== Teams ==
There are currently 5 teams that play at the Ron Jacobs. These are Thorney 1st XV Men, Thorney U11, Thorney Monks, Thorney U13 and Thorney Minis.

Thorney currently play in Eastern Counties Greene King Division One West.

== New Facilities Grant ==
Thorney RUFC have secured funding worth more than £128,000 from the Rugby Football Foundation to build new changing rooms at their Ron Jacobs Playing Fields ground near Peterborough in Cambridgeshire. The club has secured a grant of £63,415 from the RFF with a further £65,000 by way of an interest-free loan.

Work has started on the project which will see four new changing rooms and a gymnasium being built, with a scheduled completion date of March next year.

Club Chairperson, Louis Deplancke said “The extension of the present Club changing room facilities will support all sections of the club by allowing better quality training sessions and improving the club environment during the season. The improvement to the facilities is in line with the Club’s development plan to strengthen its senior and vets teams and to add junior teams at each age group year on year until all groups are covered from minis to Colts. We are extremely pleased and thank the RFF for this opportunity.”

The RFF is a charitable trust established by the Rugby Football Union with the purpose of promoting and developing community and amateur rugby in England.
