= Oundle RFC =

English rugby union club, based in Northamptonshire

(England) Oundle
- Full name: Oundle Rugby Club
- Union: East Midlands Rugby Football Union
- Founded: 1976; 50 years ago
- Location: Oundle, Northamptonshire
- Ground: Occupation Road (Capacity: 1,000)
- Chairman: Pete Croot
- Director of Rugby: Aly Kachra
- Coach(es): Gareth Collins (Head Coach); Andrew Key; Darrell Ball; Viliami Ma'asi
- Captain: Conor Gracey
- League: National League 2 East
- 2025–26: 2nd

Oundle Rugby Club is an English rugby union club based in Oundle, Northamptonshire. The first XV team currently play in National League 2 East – tier 4 of the English rugby union system – following promotion from Regional 1 South East at the end of the 2024–25 season. The club also run 2nd and 3rd XVs, an Oundle Vets XV, under-18s and a range of junior teams.

The club was formed in 1976 and in the early years of the league system the club played in the lower levels of the East Midlands leagues. The club won promotion from Midlands 4 East (South) in 2014 and this saw the start of the club's rise to the fourth tier of the English rugby union system.

== Current standings ==
2025–26 National League 2 East table
Pos	Team	Pld	W	D	L	PF	PA	PD	TB	LB	Pts	Qualification
1	Bury St Edmunds (C)	26	20	1	5	1128	659	+469	22	4	108	Promotion place
2	Oundle	26	20	2	4	940	713	+227	21	1	106	Promotion Play-off
3	Old Albanian	26	18	0	8	1009	813	+196	22	3	97	
4	Barnes	26	16	1	9	738	598	+140	15	5	86	
5	Canterbury	26	16	0	10	851	644	+207	16	6	86	
6	Dorking	26	14	2	10	798	598	+200	13	6	79	
7	Westcombe Park	26	12	0	14	851	751	+100	19	8	75	
8	Havant	26	11	1	14	840	960	−120	19	1	66	
9	London Welsh	26	10	0	16	705	866	−161	16	8	64	
10	Guernsey Raiders	26	11	1	14	690	875	−185	13	3	62	
11	Esher	26	10	0	16	844	831	+13	16	6	62	
12	Henley Hawks	26	9	2	15	693	665	+28	12	9	61	Relegation Play-off
13	Sevenoaks (R)	26	8	0	18	743	900	−157	12	5	49	Relegation place
14	Oxford Harlequins (R)	26	2	0	24	505	1462	−957	11	2	21	Relegation place

Updated to match(es) played on 2 May 2026. Source: National League Rugby
Rules for classification: If teams are level at any stage, tiebreakers are applied in the following order:
1. Number of matches won
2. Number of matches drawn
3. Difference between points for and against
4. Total number of points for
5. Aggregate number of points scored in matches between tied teams
6. Number of matches won excluding the first match, then the second and so on until the tie is settled

== Ground ==
Oundle have been based at Occupation Road since its inception in 1976, offering cricket, bowling and tennis as well as rugby union. Facilities at the ground include a club-house (originally a tea-room transported from Thorney Wildlife Park) and three full size rugby pitches. Ground capacity around the main pitch is around 1,000 (all standing).

== Honours ==
- Midlands 3 East (South) champions: 2015–16
- Midlands 2 East play-off winners 2016–17
- Regional 1 South East champions: 2024–25
