= Peterborough Lions RFC =

English rugby union club, based in Cambridgeshire

Peterborough Lions
- Full name: Peterborough Lions Rugby Football Club
- Union: East Midlands RFU
- Founded: 1944; 81 years ago (as Westwood RUFC)
- Location: Bretton, Cambridgeshire
- Ground: Bretton Woods
- Chairman: Andrew Moore
- Director of Rugby: Ian Warrington
- Coach: Nicholaas du Toit
- Captain: Joseph Lee
- League: Counties 1 Midlands East (South)
- 2024–25: 11th (relegated to Counties 2 Midlands East (South))
Team kit

Official website
- www.pitchero.com/clubs/peterboroughlionsrfc/

Peterborough Lions Rugby Football Club, formerly Westwood RUFC, is an English rugby union team based in Bretton near Peterborough. The club runs one senior team, a youth academy team, an under-16s side and four junior teams. with the first XV currently playing in Counties 2 Midlands East (South).

== Honours ==
- East Midlands 3 champions: 1991–92 (Note: East Midlands 3 title won when club was known as Westwood RUFC.)
- Midlands 2 East (South) champions: 2011–12
- Midlands 1 East champions: 2013–14
- Midlands Premier v North Premier promotion play-off winner: 2017–18
