= Leicester Lions RFC =

English rugby union club, based in Leicestershire

(England) Leicester Lions
- Full name: Leicester Lions Rugby Football Club
- Union: Leicestershire RU
- Founded: 1998; 28 years ago
- Location: Blaby, Leicestershire, England
- Ground: Westleigh Park (Capacity: 2,000)
- League: National League 1
- 2025–26: 14th (relegated to National League 2 East)
Team kit

Official website
- lionsrfc.co.uk

Leicester Lions are a rugby union club which currently play in the fourth tier of the English rugby union system, National League 2 East, following their relegation from National League 1 in 2026. The Lions are a leading amateur club in Leicester and along with Loughborough University and Hinckley are the senior clubs in Leicestershire after Premiership Rugby side Leicester Tigers. The club was formed as a result of an amalgamation between two local clubs in 1998, these being Westleigh RFC (established in 1904) and Wigston RFC (established in 1946).

Leicester Lions boast several high-profile names amongst their former and current players and coaching staff. Jason Aldwinckle, the former Leicester Tigers' hooker is the forwards coach, while the former club captain and England Counties outside back Gareth Collins has taken over as head coach. Notable former Lions, Westleigh and Wigston players include England World Cup winning captain Martin Johnson, England lock Louis Deacon, Tigers back-rower Brett Deacon and Gloucester and England centre Billy Twelvetrees.

== Current standings ==
2025–26 National League 1 table
Pos	Team	Pld	W	D	L	PF	PA	PD	TB	LB	Pts	Qualification
1	Rotherham Titans (C, P)	26	22	0	4	1052	515	+537	20	3	111	Promotion place
2	Blackheath (P)	26	21	0	5	911	530	+381	20	3	107	Promotion play-off
3	Plymouth Albion	26	20	0	6	1000	549	+451	22	2	104	Promotion play-off
4	Rosslyn Park	26	17	0	9	944	709	+235	23	4	95	
5	Sale FC	26	17	0	9	826	590	+236	19	5	92	
6	Bishop's Stortford	26	13	0	13	781	836	−55	20	5	77	
7	Rams	26	13	0	13	780	798	−18	17	6	75	
8	Tonbridge Juddians	26	11	1	14	805	733	+72	19	7	72	
9	Leeds Tykes	26	11	0	15	658	873	−215	12	2	58	
10	Dings Crusaders	26	9	0	17	719	942	−223	16	5	57	
11	Birmingham Moseley	26	8	1	17	660	757	−97	14	8	56	Relegation play-off
12	Clifton (R)	26	9	0	17	621	909	−288	13	4	53	Relegation place
13	Sedgley Park (R)	26	8	0	18	547	923	−376	11	3	46	Relegation place
14	Leicester Lions (R)	26	2	0	24	599	1239	−640	13	2	23	Relegation place

Updated to match(es) played on 25 April 2026. Source: National League Rugby
Rules for classification: If teams are level at any stage, tiebreakers are applied in the following order:
1. Number of matches won
2. Number of matches drawn
3. Difference between points for and against
4. Total number of points for
5. Aggregate number of points scored in matches between tied teams
6. Number of matches won excluding the first match, then the second and so on until the tie is settled

== Honours ==
Leicester Lions (1998–present)

- Leicestershire County Cup winners (3): 1999–00, 2000–01, 2003–04 (Note: If you count the wins by parent clubs Westleigh RFC (5) and Wigston (1) then Leicester Lions have won the Leicestershire County Cup nine times.)
- National League 2 West champions: 2022–23
- Midlands Division 1 champions: 2004–05

Westleigh (Parent club)

- Leicestershire County Cup winners (5): 1974–75, 1975–76, 1979–80, 1980–81, 1995–96

Wigston (Parent club)

- Leicestershire County Cup winners: 1973–74
- Leicestershire 1 champions: 1997–98
