= Old Northamptonians RFC =

English rugby union football club

(England) Old Northamptonians RFC
- Full name: Old Northamptonians Rugby Football Club
- Union: East Midlands Rugby Football Union
- Nickname: ONs
- Founded: 1922; 104 years ago
- Location: Northampton, Northamptonshire, England
- Ground: Sir Humphrey Cripps Pavilion
- Chairman: Dave Howland
- Director of Rugby: Richard Blank
- Coach(es): Charlie Reed, Alex Regan
- Captain: Ben Rivans
- League: Regional 1 South East
- 2025–26: 8th

Official website
- www.pitchero.com/clubs/oldnorthamptonians/

Old Northamptonians Rugby Football Club is a rugby union club located in Northampton, Northamptonshire. The first XV was promoted in 2022–23 and currently play in Regional 1 South East, a fifth tier league in the English rugby union system..

In the 2025–26 season, the club entered a second team into the RFU leagues for the first time, playing at level 9, Counties_3_Midlands_East_(South) league, winning 14 of 15 matches to finish top and win promotion to level 8.

In April 2026, the third team were the subject of an article in The Times newspaper when rugby reporter, Alex Lowe, followed the team on an end of season "tour" to Old_Wheatleyans_RFC in Coventry. On observing a great day of friendly rugby, the camaraderie of the team and RFU's core values in practise, he concluded that in grassroots clubs, "this is where rugby’s heart and soul still lives".

In the 2025–26 season, the Old Northamptonians Ladies celebrated their 10 year anniversary, and competed in the Women's NC 2 Midlands (Central) league. A very successful social media campaign, coupled with the Women's Rugby World Cup in 2025 including matches at Franklin's Gardens in Northampton, and rising numbers of participation in the ladies rugby have led to a bid to run two ladies league teams in 2026-27.

== History ==
Old Northamptonians Rugby Football Club was founded in 1922–23 by W.C.C. Cooke, who was the headmaster of Northampton Grammar School. The Old Northamptonians Association had been created in 1919 to commemorate those ex-pupils and teachers who were killed in World War I, but the first rugby match played was on 11th November 1922, Armistice Day, between Old Northamptonians and Heathens.

The Old Northamptonians played a fixture on Boxing Day 1922 on Northampton Racecourse against a Northampton Alliance team; the fixture was advertised in the local newspaper, but the result is not recorded. The fixture was planned to be replayed during the club's centenary season, on Boxing Day 2022, this time at the home ground at Billing Road.

In the early years, ONRFC did not have their own home ground and played their fixtures at Northampton Racecourse. However in November 1936 the Old Northamptonians Association secured the lease of 17½ acres of previously agricultural land adjoining Billing Road and Park Avenue South, to provide two rugby pitches and one cricket pitch. At the time the club had rugby two teams, and with the establishment of a home ground, aspired to running four rugby teams. By the end of the 1949–50 season, the club was indeed running four teams, and the Town Planning Committee had approved plans for a clubhouse to be built.

The club has played an important role in developing players who have gone on to play for Northampton Saints, including Tom Collins and James Grayson. One of the club's most famous former players is Bob Taylor who gained 16 caps for England and 2 caps for the British Lions, as well as becoming President of the RFU in 2007.

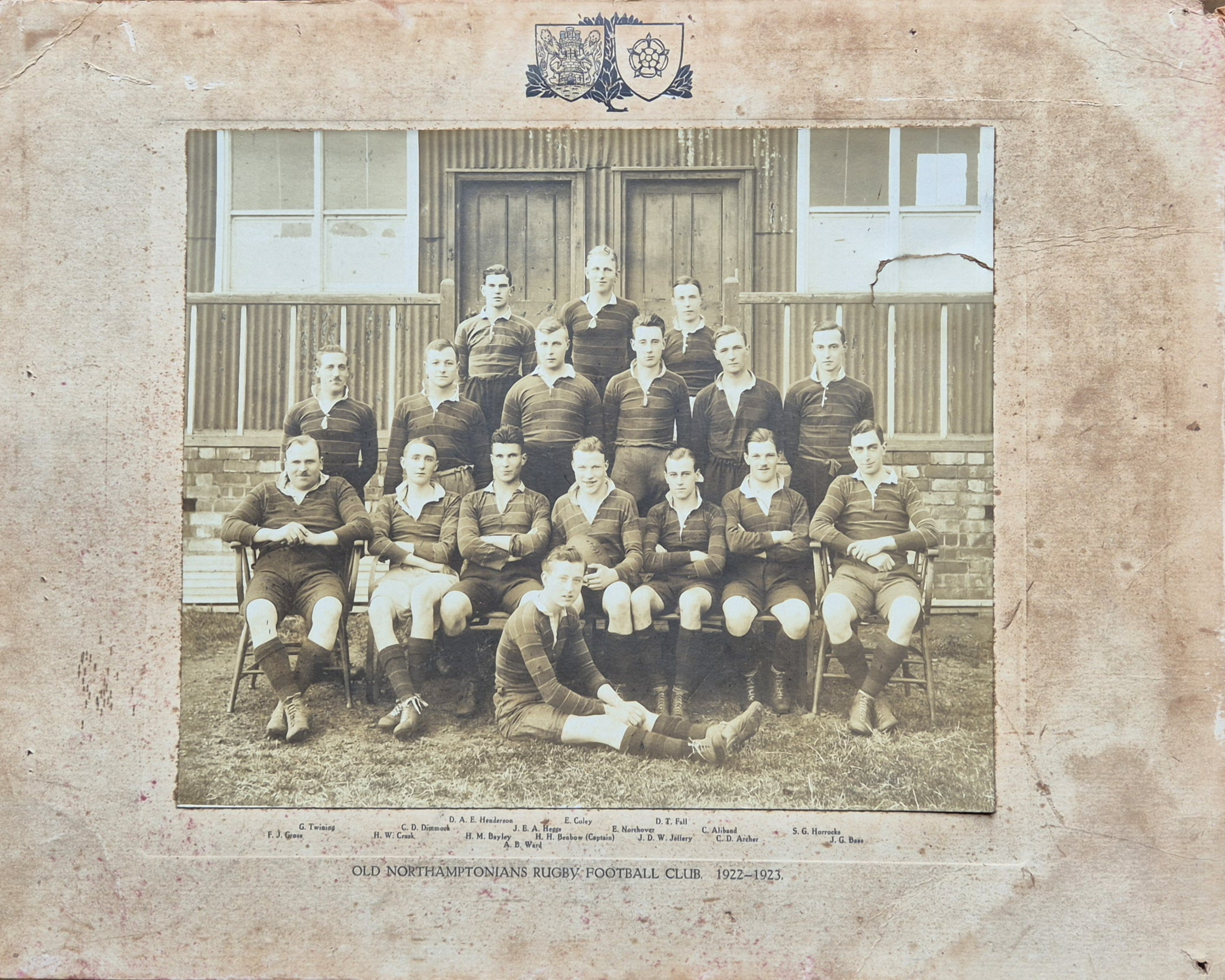
Old Northamptonians RFC 1922-23

== Honours ==
- Regional 2 East Midlands champions: 2022–23
- Midlands 3 East (South) champions: 2008–09
- East Midlands/Leicestershire 3 champions: 1992–93
- East Midlands/Leicestershire 2 champions: 1993–94
- East Midlands/Leicestershire 1 champions: 1994–95
- Midlands 1 (east v west) play-off winners (2): 2009–10, 2014–15

Old Northamptonians have won the Northampton & District Alliance Cup 23 times, including a run of 14 consecutive titles from 2004 to 2017. The club regained the title in 2022, and also won the Lewis Shield and Oceanic Trophy competitions, the first time this "treble" has been achieved. ONs regained all three trophies in the 2025-26 season, completing the "hat trick" across the competitions for the second time.

In the centenary season 2022–23, in addition to winning the league, ONs retained the Oceanic Trophy and the Lewis Shield. Having lost the centenary Alliance Cup Final against rivals Northampton Old Scouts 12-67, ONs went on to win the inaugural Regional 2 Championship of the Papa John's Community Cup at Twickenham.

== Cup competition wins ==
Season	RFU Regional 2 National Cup	Alliance Cup	Lewis Shield	Oceanic Trophy
2025/26		Old Northamptonians R.F.C.	Old Northamptonians R.F.C.	Old Northamptonians R.F.C.
2022/23	Old Northamptonians R.F.C.		Old Northamptonians R.F.C.	Old Northamptonians R.F.C.
2021/22		Old Northamptonians R.F.C.	Old Northamptonians R.F.C.	Old Northamptonians R.F.C.
2018/19				Old Northamptonians R.F.C.
2017/18				Old Northamptonians R.F.C.
2016/17		Old Northamptonians R.F.C.		Old Northamptonians R.F.C.
2015/16		Old Northamptonians R.F.C.		
2014/15		Old Northamptonians R.F.C.		Old Northamptonians R.F.C.
2013/14		Old Northamptonians R.F.C.		Old Northamptonians R.F.C.
2012/13		Old Northamptonians R.F.C.		
2011/12		Old Northamptonians R.F.C.		
2010/11		Old Northamptonians R.F.C.		
2009/10		Old Northamptonians R.F.C.		Old Northamptonians R.F.C.
2008/09		Old Northamptonians R.F.C.		
2007/08		Old Northamptonians R.F.C.		Old Northamptonians R.F.C.
2006/07		Old Northamptonians R.F.C.		
2005/06		Old Northamptonians R.F.C.		Old Northamptonians R.F.C.
2004/05		Old Northamptonians R.F.C.		
2003/04		Old Northamptonians R.F.C.		Old Northamptonians R.F.C.
2001/02				Old Northamptonians R.F.C.
2000/01				Old Northamptonians R.F.C.
1998/99		Old Northamptonians R.F.C.	Old Northamptonians R.F.C.	
1997/98		Old Northamptonians R.F.C.		
1996/97		Old Northamptonians R.F.C.		
1994/95			Old Northamptonians R.F.C.	
1991/92				Old Northamptonians R.F.C.
1989/90				Old Northamptonians R.F.C.
1988/89				Old Northamptonians R.F.C.
1984/85		Old Northamptonians R.F.C.		
1982/83			Old Northamptonians R.F.C.	
1981/82		Old Northamptonians R.F.C.		
1980/81		Old Northamptonians R.F.C.		
1978/79			Old Northamptonians R.F.C.	
1971/72			Old Northamptonians R.F.C.	
1961/62		Old Northamptonians R.F.C.		
1950/51			Old Northamptonians R.F.C.	
