= Biggleswade RUFC =

English rugby union club, based in Biggleswade, Bedfordshire

Biggleswade Rugby Club
- Full name: Biggleswade Rugby Union Football Club & Associated Clubs
- Union: East Midlands RFU
- Nickname: Biggy
- Founded: 1949; 77 years ago
- Location: Biggleswade, Bedfordshire, England
- Ground(s): Langford Road Biggleswade, SG18 9RA (Capacity: 3,000)
- Captain: Elliot Tunstall
- League: Counties 1 Midlands East (South)
- 2024-25: 6th
Team kit

Official website
- www.biggleswaderugby.co.uk

Biggleswade Rugby Club is an English rugby union team based in Biggleswade, Bedfordshire. The club runs 3 senior mens teams and occasionally a vet side. The first XV play in Counties 1 South East, of the rugby union system.The club also runs 1 ladies senior team and ages groups for 6 to 18 years of age.
