= Dunstablians RUFC =

English rugby union club, based in Houghton Regis, Bedfordshire

(England) Dunstablians
- Full name: Dunstablians Rugby Union Football Club
- Union: East Midlands RFU
- Nickname: The Dees
- Founded: 1948; 78 years ago
- Location: Houghton Regis, Bedfordshire, England
- Ground: Bidwell Park
- Chairman: Jon Gilbert
- President: Damian Daize
- Director of Rugby: Reece Marshall
- Coach(es): Kirk Collins, Jason Worrell & Dicky Jones
- Captain: Kevin Boland
- League: Counties 2 Midlands East (South)
- 2024–25: 2nd (promoted to Counties 1 Midlands East (South))

Official website
- dunstablians.rfu.club

Dunstablians Rugby Union Football Club are an amateur rugby union club based in Bedfordshire, who play their rugby in Counties 1 Midlands East (South), a seventh tier league in the English rugby union system. Their ground is located just outside nearby Houghton Regis and is commonly known as Bidwell Park. The club run two Senior teams and a full Mini & Junior section (catering for 5-15 year old players) and Academy teams (catering for 16-18 year old players). Numerous local rivalries are shared, most notably with Stockwood Park and Luton Rugby Club.

== History ==
In 1927, members of Dunstable Grammar School formed a rugby section, based at Fensomes Field in Leagrave, Luton. Unfortunately, the number of regular players dwindled, forcing the closure of the club after only three seasons.

In 1948, another group of former pupils made a new start, securing a ground at French's Avenue in Dunstable and later moving to Skimpot Lane in Luton. In 1954 ground in Bullpond Lane, Dunstable was leased. The event was marked with a match against an East Midlands Invitation XV. It was eventually decided that a new ground was needed and the site at Bidwell Hill in Houghton Regis should be purchased, with the bulk of the financing raised through the sale of the Bullpond Lane site for housing development.

In September 1985, the club opened the current clubhouse by hosting an International XV that included six past England Captains.

The club has seen several promotions in the past. Highlights include the near perfect 1999/2000 season which delivered victory in all RFU competitions entered, along with League, County and East Midlands Cup success. This culminated in Dunstablians becoming National Intermediate Cup Champions at Twickenham.

A successful period followed; Dunstablians retained the County Cup in 2000/01 and added the Colts Cup to the collection. They lifted the County Cup again in 2005. During 2006/07 Dunstablians also secured the Bedfordshire County Cup, defeating Bedford Athletic in the process. They then returned to Twickenham for their second Intermediate Cup Final losing 36–46 to Cornish side Mounts Bay and finished 3rd in Midlands League 1 (RFU Level 5), their highest ever league placing.

After a five-year wait, Dunstablians won the Beds County Cup again by defeating Stockwood Park in 2012, but since then have finished runners up in no less than three successive County Cup Finals.

== Honours ==
1st XV:

- Midlands East 2 champions: 1997–98
- Midlands East 1 (Note: Not to be confused with Midlands 1 East.) champions: 1999–00
- Bedfordshire County Cup winners (5): 2000, 2001, 2005, 2007, 2012
- East Midlands Cup winners: 2000
- Midlands 2 East champions: 2000–01
- NPI Cup Champions: 2000
- Rugby World Magazine – Team of the Year: 2001
- Bedfordshire Shield winners: 2019

Youth

- Bedfordshire Colts County Cup winners: 2001

== International honours ==
Nationality	Player	Honours
(Denmark)	Marcus Vass	Denmark
(England)	Max Thorne	England Deaf & England Deaf Sevens
(South Africa)	Morne Loxton	South Africa U21s
(South Africa)	Harry Roberts	South Africa
(New Zealand)	Anthony Niven	New Zealand U19s
(England)	Reece Marshall	England U18s
(England)	Josh Skelcey	England U18s
