= East Midlands Rugby Football Union =

- Sport: Rugby union
- Jurisdiction: Bedfordshire, England
- Abbreviation: EMRU
- Founded: 1887; 138 years ago
- Affiliation: RFU
- Headquarters: Bedfordshire
- President: Peter Franklin
- Chairman: Chris Parr
- CEO: Derek Hodgkinson
- Secretary: Keith Bateman

Official website
- www.emru.co.uk
- (England)

The East Midlands Rugby Football Union (EMRFU) is a governing body for rugby union in part of The Midlands, England. The union is the constituent body of the Rugby Football Union for the counties of Bedfordshire and Northamptonshire and the Huntingdonshire and Peterborough districts of Cambridgeshire and administers and organises rugby union clubs and competitions in those areas. It also administers the East Midlands county rugby representative teams.

== Organisation ==
The EMRFU has four sub-counties, each responsible for a particular geographical area. The sub-counties are the East Northants Rugby Union, Bedfordshire County Rugby Football Union, Northampton & District Rugby Alliance and the Huntingdonshire & Peterborough Rugby Union.

== County team ==
East Midlands team kit

The East Midlands senior men's county team currently competes in the Division 2 of the English County Championship.

=== Honours ===
- County Championship winners (2): 1934, 1951
- County Championship Division 2 winners: 2016

== Affiliated clubs ==
There are 45 clubs currently affiliated to EMRFU, listed below. Source:

- Ampthill
- Bedford Athletic
- Bedford Blues
- Bedford Queens RFC
- Bedford Swifts RFC
- Biggleswade
- Bletchley (Note: Bletchley are joint members of the Buckinghamshire RFU and East Midlands RFU.)
- Brackley RFC
- Bugbrooke RFC
- Corby RFC
- Cranfield University RFC
- Daventry RFC
- Deepings RFC
- Dunstablians
- Huntingdon & District RFC
- Kempston RFC
- Kettering
- Leighton Buzzard
- Long Buckby RFC
- Luton
- Milton Keynes (Note: Milton Keynes are joint members of the Buckinghamshire RFU and East Midlands RFU.)
- Northampton BBOB RFC
- Northampton Casuals RFC
- Northampton Heathens RFC
- Northampton Mens Own RFC
- Northampton Old Scouts RFC
- Northampton Outlaws RFC
- Northampton Saints
- Old Northamptonians
- Olney (Note: Olney are joint members of the Buckinghamshire RFU and East Midlands RFU.)
- Oundle RFC
- Peterborough
- Peterborough Lions
- Rushden & Higham
- Shambrook & Colworth RFC
- Stamford RFC
- St Ives
- St Neots
- Stewarts & Lloyds RFC
- Stockwood Park RFC
- Thorney
- Towcestrians
- Wellingborough Old Grammarians
- Wellingborough RFC
- Winslow RFC

== East Midlands club competitions ==
The East Midlands RFU currently runs the following competitions for club sides:

=== Cups ===
- East Midlands Cup - open to clubs in Bedfordshire, Northamptonshire and parts of Cambridgeshire, typically playing at tiers 5-7 of the English rugby union system

=== Discontinued competitions ===
- Midlands 5 East (South) - tier 10 league that ran between 2006 and 2010
- East Midlands/Leicestershire 1 – tier 7-10 league for East Midlands and Leicestershire based clubs that ran between 1987 and 2000
- East Midlands/Leicestershire 2 – tier 10-11 league for East Midlands and Leicestershire based clubs that ran intermittently between 1992 and 2000
- East Midlands/Leicestershire 3 – tier 11-12 league for East Midlands and Leicestershire based clubs that ran intermittently between 1992 and 2000
- East Midlands/Leicestershire 4 – tier 12-13 league for East Midlands and Leicestershire based clubs that ran between 1992 and 1996
- East Midlands 1 – tier 8-10 league that ran intermittently between 1987 and 2004
- East Midlands 2 – tier 9-10 league that ran intermittently between 1987 and 2004
- East Midlands 3 – tier 10 league that ran between 1987 and 1992

== See also ==
- Midland Division
- English rugby union system
