= Leicestershire Rugby Union =

Leicestershire RU
- Full name: Leicestershire Rugby Union
- Founded: 1887; 138 years ago
- Region: Leicestershire, Rutland
- President: Graham Cree
Team kit

Official website
- leicestershirerugbyunion.co.uk

The Leicestershire Rugby Union (LRU) is the governing body for the sport of rugby union in the counties of Leicestershire and Rutland in England. The union is the constituent body of the Rugby Football Union (RFU) for those counties. The LRU administers and organises rugby union clubs and competitions in those two counties and administers the Leicestershire county rugby representative teams.

== History ==
The Leicestershire Rugby Union was founded as the Leicestershire County Football Union in 1887 after a meeting of rugby clubs in Leicester and was affiliated to the RFU in 1890. The union was a sub-union of the Midland Counties Rugby Union until just after World War One when the Midland Counties union was dissolved, partly because players from Leicester had come to dominate the Midland Counties team. In 1920 the LRU became a full constituent member of the RFU and began competing in the County Championship. The union initially also administered rugby union in Nottinghamshire as well as Rutland and the first AGM of the new union took place in June 1920, when the name was changed to the Leicestershire Rugby Union. The union's control over Nottinghamshire ended when Notts, Lincs and Derbys Rugby Union was founded in 1925.

== County team ==
The Leicestershire senior men's county team currently competes in the Division 2 of the English County Championship. Leicestershire won the third tier competition, the County Championship Shield, with victory over Cumbria at Twickenham Stadium in June 2015, having previously finished as losing finalists four times. Following their Shield win, the county moved up to County Championship Plate level. In 2017 they won the County Championship Plate for the first time.

== County team honours ==
Men's

- County Championship winners: 1925
- County Championship Division 2 winners (2): 2017, 2019
- County Championship Division 3 winners: 2015

Women's

- County Championship winners: 2022

== Affiliated clubs ==
There are currently 34 clubs affiliated with the Leicestershire RU, most of which have teams at both senior and junior level. The majority of teams are based in Leicestershire but there are also teams from Rutland and even Warwickshire.

- Anstey
- Ashby
- Aylestone Athletic
- Aylestone St James
- Aylestonians
- Belgrave
- Birstall
- Burbage
- Coalville
- Cosby
- De Montfort University
- Hinckley
- Leicester Forest
- Leicester Lions
- Leicester Medics
- Leicester Thursday
- Leicester Tigers
- Light Blues
- Loughborough
- Loughborough Students
- Lutterworth
- Market Bosworth
- Market Harborough
- Melton Mowbray
- Oadby Wyggestonian
- Oakham
- Old Newtonians
- Quorn
- Shepshed
- Sileby Town
- South Leicester
- Stoneygate
- Syston
- University of Leicester
- Vipers

== County club competitions ==
The Leicestershire RU currently runs the following competitions for club sides based in Leicestershire and Rutland:

=== Cups ===
- Leicestershire County Cup - founded in 1890 as the Leicestershire Senior Cup, open to clubs typically playing at tiers 5-7 of the English rugby union system
- Leicestershire Bowl

=== Discontinued competitions ===
- Leicestershire Junior Cup - founded in 1887 as the second most important cup in the county until it was discontinued in 1936
- Rolleston Charity Cup - founded in 1897, changed to a sevens competition in 1927 until it was disbanded in 1979
- Midlands 5 East (North) - tier 10 league that ran between 2006 and 2018
- Midlands 5 East (South) - tier 10 league that ran between 2006 and 2010
- East Midlands/Leicestershire 1 – tier 7-10 league for East Midlands and Leicestershire based clubs that ran between 1987 and 2000
- East Midlands/Leicestershire 2 – tier 10-11 league for East Midlands and Leicestershire based clubs that ran intermittently between 1992 and 2000
- East Midlands/Leicestershire 3 – tier 11-12 league for East Midlands and Leicestershire based clubs that ran intermittently between 1992 and 2000
- East Midlands/Leicestershire 4 – tier 12-13 league for East Midlands and Leicestershire based clubs that ran between 1992 and 1996
- Leicestershire 1 – tier 8-10 league that ran intermittently between 1992 and 1998
- Leicestershire 2 – tier 9-11 league that ran intermittently between 1992 and 1998
- Notts, Lincs & Derbyshire/Leicestershire 1 East – tier 9 league for Notts, Lincs and east Leicestershire clubs that ran between 2000 and 2004
- Notts, Lincs & Derbyshire/Leicestershire 1 West – tier 9 league for Notts, Derbyshire and west Leicestershire clubs that ran between 2000 and 2004
- Notts, Lincs & Derbyshire/Leicestershire 2 East – tier 10 league for Notts, Lincs and east Leicestershire clubs that ran between 2000 and 2004
- Notts, Lincs & Derbyshire/Leicestershire 2 West – tier 10 league for Notts, Derbyshire and west Leicestershire clubs that ran between 2000 and 2004

== See also ==
- Midland Division
- English rugby union system
