= Old Boys =

Name for alumni of UK schools

The terms Old Boys and Old Girls are the usual expressions in use in the United Kingdom for former pupils of primary and secondary schools. While these are traditionally associated with independent schools, they are also used for some schools in the state sector. The term is also used for those who attended schools in the Commonwealth realms, a few universities in the UK and, to a lesser extent, schools in Australia, New Zealand, Republic of Ireland, South Africa and Spain.

The Old Boy form is given a specific identification for each school. Some schools use an adjectival form of the school name, such as "Old Etonian", "Old Harrovian", or "Old Oundelian" (old boys of Eton College, Harrow School, and Oundle School). Some use a Latin form derived from the Latin name of the school or its location as "Old Novaportan" (old boys of Adams' Grammar School, Newport, Shropshire). Some are based on the name of the founder, such as "Old Wykehamist" and "Old Alleynian" (for old boys of Winchester College, founded by William of Wykeham, and Dulwich College, founded by Edward Alleyn). Some are based on the school's location or street, such as "Old Gowers" (for University College School, originally in Gower Street). Many of the schools have histories dating back several hundred years, and the Old Boy forms may have been in use for a hundred years or more. Other more recently established schools have devised Old Boy names that are distinctive to prevent confusion with other schools. The tradition for many girls' schools has been to use the term "Seniors" rather than "Old Girls".

Almost all of these schools have old boy associations that use the official name. Some schools have amalgamated or been renamed through various transformations, but they usually maintain a consistent name for their old boy associations. Many of these schools have teams that compete nationally in sports such as cricket, rugby union, association football, field hockey and golf, and these teams are usually referred to by the standard Old Boy name, although some also have nicknames. In deference to this tradition, the standard "Old Boys" is often used for sporting clubs and used as part of many sporting associations and clubs worldwide. Examples include Argentine football club Newell's Old Boys, New Zealand rugby union club High School Old Boys RFC and Swiss football club BSC Old Boys.

== Lists of schools and old boy associations ==
=== Belgium ===
School	Type	Old Boys/Girls	Derivation	Location	Notes
Isabelle Gatti de Gamond Royal Atheneum, Brussels		Gatticiennes			

=== India ===
School	Type	Old Boys/Girls	Derivation	Location	Notes
Bishop Cotton Boys' School, Bangalore		Old Cottonians			
Bishop Cotton School, Shimla		Old Cottonians			
The Doon School, Dehradun		Doscos	A contraction of "Doon" and "School"		
St. Edward's School, Shimla		Old Edwardians			
La Martiniere, Calcutta		Old Martinians			
La Martinière College, Lucknow		Old Martinians			
Mayo College		Old Mayoites			
Mayo College Girls School		Old Mayoites			
Mount Carmel School		Mount Carmelites			
St Paul's School, Darjeeling		Old Paulites			
Rashtriya Indian Military College, Dehradun		Old Rimcollians	From abbreviation of name to "RIM Coll."		
Lawrence School, Sanawar		Old Sanawarians			
Lawrence School, Lovedale		Old Lawrencians			

=== New Zealand ===
School	Type	Old Boys/Girls	Derivation	Location	Notes
King's College, Auckland		Old Collegians			
St Peter's College, Auckland		St Peter's Old Boys			St Peter's College Old Boys Association
Tawa College, Wellington		Tawa College Old Boys			

=== Sri Lanka ===
School	Type	Old Boys/Girls	Derivation	Location	Notes
Dharmaraja College, Kandy		Old Rajans			
Nalanda College, Colombo		Old Nalandians			
Royal College, Colombo		Old Royalists		Colombo	
S. Thomas' College, Mount Lavinia		Old Thomians			
Trinity College, Kandy		Old Trinitians			
Zahira College, Colombo		Old Zahirians			

=== South Africa ===
School	Type	Old Boys/Girls	Derivation	Location	Notes
Diocesan College		Old Diocesans			
Grey College, Bloemfontein		Old Greys			
Highbury Preparatory School		Old Highburians			
Hilton College		Old Hiltonians			
Kearsney College		Kearsney College Old Boys			
Roedean School (South Africa)		Old Roedeanians			
King Edward VII School (Johannesburg)		Old Edwardians			
Maritzburg College		Old Collegians			
Michaelhouse		Michaelhouse Old Boys			
Paarl Boys' High School		Paarl Old Boys			
Paarl Gimnasium		Paarl Gimnasium Old Boys			
Rondebosch Boys' High School		Rondebosch Old Boys			
St Stithians College		Old Stithians			
St Andrew's College, Grahamstown		Old Andreans	From Andreas, Latin for "Andrew"		
Selborne College		Old Selbornians			
South African College Schools (SACS)		SACS Old Boys			

=== Spain ===
School	Type	Old Boys/Girls	Derivation	Location	Notes
Instituto San Isidro		Old Franciscans			
Runnymede College		Old Runnymedians			
Colegio del Pilar		Old Pilarists			
Colegio Gaztelueta		Old Opusdeists			
Nuestra Señora de Montesión		Old Zionists			

=== United States ===
School	Type	Old Boys/Girls	Derivation	Location	Notes
Phillips Academy		Old Phillipians			

=== United Kingdom ===
School	Type	Old Boys/Girls	Derivation	Location	Notes
Abingdon School	Private day and boarding school	Old Abingdonians		Abingdon-on-Thames	
Adams' Grammar School	Grammar school, Boarding school, Academy	Old Novaportans	From the town in which the school is situated	Newport, Shropshire	
Addey and Stanhope School	Voluntary-aided	Old Addeyans	From the founder of the Addey School, John Addey	Lewisham, London	
Aldenham School		Old Aldenhamians			
Ampleforth College		Old Amplefordians			
Archbishop Tenison's Church of England High School, Croydon		Old Tenisonians			
Archbishop Tenison's Church of England School		Old Tenisonians	Same foundation		
Ardingly College		Old Ardinians	"Ardinian" refers to Ardingly		
Arnold School		Old Arnoldians			
Ashville College		Old Ashvillians			
Astley Sports College and Community High School		Old Astleians			
Aysgarth School	Prep	Old Aysgarthians			
Bablake School		Old Wheatleyans	From the school's main benefactor, Thomas Wheatley		
Badminton School		Old Badmintonians			
Bancroft's School		Old Bancroftians			
Batley Grammar School		Old Batelians	"Bately" is an alternative spelling of Batley		
Bedales School		Old Bedalians			
Bedford School		Old Bedfordians			
Bedford Modern School		Old Bedford Modernians			
Bedlingtonshire Community High School		Old Bedlingtonians			
St Bede's College, Manchester		Old Bedians			
Bemrose School		Old Bemrosians			Closed 1989
Benenden School		Benenden Seniors	"Seniors" avoids the term "old girls"		
Berkhamsted School		Old Berkhamstedians			
Birkdale School		Old Birkdalians			
Birkenhead School		Old Birkonians			
Bishop Gore School		Old Goreans			
Bishop's Stortford College		Old Stortfordians			
Bishop Wordsworth's School		Old Wordsworthians			
Bloxham School		Old Bloxhamists			
Blundell's School		Old Blundellians			
Bolton School		Old Boltonians			
Bootham School		Bootham Old Scholars			
Bradfield College		Old Bradfieldians			
Bradford Grammar School		Old Bradfordians			
Brentwood School (Essex)		Old Brentwoods			
Bridgnorth Endowed School		Old Bridgnorthians			
Brighton College		Old Brightonians			
Bristol Cathedral Choir School		Old Cathedralians			
Bristol Grammar School		Old Bristolians			-
Bromley High School		Bromley Old Girls			
Bromsgrove School		Old Bromsgrovians			
Bruce Castle School		Old Brucastrians	Castra is Latin for castle		Closed 1891
Bryanston School		Old Bryanstonians			
Bury Grammar School		Old Clavians	From the school motto Sanctas Clavis Hic Fores Aperit (c. 1570)		
Buxton College		Old Buxtonians			
Calday Grange Grammar School		Old Caldeians			
Campbell College		Old Campbellians			
Canford School		Old Canfordians			
Caterham School		Old Caterhamians			
Charterhouse School		Old Carthusians	From the Carthusian Order, which founded the Charterhouses		
Chatham House Grammar School		Old Ruymians	From an old name for Thanet		
Cheadle Hulme School		Old Waconians	From the former name of Warehousemen and Clerks' Orphan Schools (WaCO)		
Cheltenham College		Old Cheltonians	Cheltenham changed to Chelton-		
Chigwell School		Old Chigwellians			
Christ College, Brecon		Old Breconians			
Christ's Hospital		Old Blues			
Churcher's College		Old Churcherians			
City of London School		Old Citizens	"Citizen" originally referred to one belonging to a city		
City of Oxford School		City of Oxford School Old Boys			
Clapham College	Voluntary Aided	Clapham Old Xaverians		Clapham, London	Closed 1984
Clifton College		Old Cliftonians			
Colchester Royal Grammar School		Old Colcestrians			
Colfe's School		Old Colfeians			
The College of Richard Collyer		Old Collyerians			
Cothill House	Prep	Old Cothillians			
Cranleigh School		Old Cranleighans			
Culford School		Old Culfordians			
Dauntsey's School		Old Dauntseians			
Dean Close School		Old Decanians	Decanus is Latin for Dean	Cheltenham, Gloucestershire	
Denstone College		Old Denstonians			
Derby School		Old Derbeians			Closed 1989
Derby Grammar School		Old Derbeians	Adopted name of former school's old boys by permission of Old Derbeian Association		
Dinnington High School	Comprehensive	Old Dinnonians		Sheffield, Yorkshire	
Diss Grammar School		Old Dysseans			
Dollar Academy		Old Academicals			
Douai School		Old Dowegians	From Douai's medieval English name Doway (compare Norwegian)	Paris (1615–1789); Douai (1818–1903); Woolhampton, Berkshire 1903-1999	Closed 1999
Dover College		Old Dovorians			
Dover Grammar School for Boys		Old Pharosians	From Latin pharos, lighthouse, referring to the Roman lighthouses for which Dover was once famous.		
Downe House School		Downe House Seniors	Avoids term "old girls"		
Down High School	Grammar School	Old Dunumians	Taken from the schools Latin Motto, "Floreat Dunum"	Downpatrick, County Down, Northern Ireland	
Downside School		Old Gregorians	Founded by Gregorian Order		
Dragon School		Old Dragons			
Dulwich College		Old Alleynians	After the founder (1619) Edward Alleyn		
Durham School		Old Dunelmians	Dunelm is the Latin signature of the Bishop of Durham		
Eastbourne College		Old Eastbournians			
Edinburgh Academy		Edinburgh Academicals			
Elizabeth College, Guernsey		Old Elizabethans		Guernsey	
Ellesmere College		Old Ellesmerians			
Eltham College		Old Elthamians			
Emanuel School		Old Emanuels			
Epsom College		Old Epsomians			
Ermysted's Grammar School		Old Ermystedians			
Eton College		Old Etonians			
Exeter School		Old Exonians			
Fairfield Grammar School		Old Fairfieldians			
Felsted School		Old Felstedians			
Fettes College		Old Fettesians			
Forest School (Walthamstow)		Old Foresters			
Foster's School		Old Fosterians			
Framlingham College		Old Framlinghamians			
Frensham Heights School		Old Frenshamians			
Friars School, Bangor		Old Dominicans	Established on a Dominican Friary (1557)		
Furness Academy		Old Barrovians	"Barrovian" refers to the Barrow of Barrow-in-Furness		
Giggleswick School		Old Giggleswickians			
Glenalmond College		Old Glenalmond			
Godolphin and Latymer School		Old Dolphins	Abbreviation of Godolphin		
Gordonstoun		Old Gordonstounians			
Gresham's School		Old Greshamians			
Haberdashers' Boys' School		Old Haberdashers			
Haileybury and Imperial Service College		Old Haileyburians			
Hampton School		Old Hamptonians			
Hanley Castle High School		Old Hancastrians			
The Harrodian School		Old Harrodians			
Harrow School	Ind	Old Harrovians			
Harrow High School	Comp	Old Gaytonians	After original site in Gayton Road		
Hawtreys	Prep	Old Hawtreysians			
Headington School, Oxford		Old Headingtonians			
Hereford Cathedral School		Old Herefordians			
Highgate School		Old Cholmeleians	After founder Sir Roger Cholmeley		
Hull Grammar School		Hull Old Grammarians			
Hurstpierpoint College		Old Johnians	Formerly St John's College, Hurstpierpoint		
Hymers College		Old Hymerians			
Ibstock Place School		Old Ibstonians			
Ilford County High School		Old Parkonians	From former name Park Higher Grade School		
Ilkeston Grammar School		Old Ilkestonians			
Ipswich School		Old Ipswichians			
The John Roan School		Old Roans			
The Judd School		Old Juddians			
Kelly College		Old Kelleians			
Kendrick School		Kendrick Old Girls			
Kimbolton School		Old Kimboltians			
King's College School		Old Kings			
King's College, Taunton		Old Aluredians	Name "King's College" was given in honour of King Alfred, and "Aluredian" refers to him		
The King's School, Chester		Old King's Scholars		Chester	
The King's School, Canterbury		Old King's Scholars		Canterbury	
The King's School, Peterborough		Old Petriburgians			
King's School, Rochester		Old Roffensians	"Roffensis" is a Latin adjective from Rochester's name in Old English		
The King's School, Worcester		Old Vigornians	Latin Vigorniensis, of Worcester		
King's School, Bruton		Old Brutonians			
King Edward VI Aston		Aston Old Edwardians			
King Edward VI School (Bury St Edmunds)		Old Burians			
King Edward VI Grammar School (Chelmsford)		Old Chelmsfordians			
King Edward VI School, Southampton		Old Edwardians		Southampton	
King Edward VI School, Stratford-upon-Avon		Old Edwardians		Stratford-upon-Avon	
King Edward VII School, Sheffield		Old Edwardians		Sheffield	
King Edward's School, Bath		Old Edwardians		Bath	
King Edward's School, Birmingham		Old Edwardians		Birmingham	
King Edward's School, Witley		Old Witleians			
King Henry VIII School, Coventry		Old Coventrians			
King George V College		Old Georgians			
Kingston Grammar School		Old Kingstonians		Kingston upon Thames	
Kingswood School		Old Kingswoodians		Bath	
Kirkham Grammar School		Old Kirkhamians			
Lancaster Royal Grammar School		Old Lancastrians			
Lancing College		Old Lancing			
Langley School, Loddon		Icenians	Refers to the Iceni who once occupied the locality		
Latymer Upper School		Old Latymerians			
Lawrence Sheriff School		Old Laurentians			
Leicester Grammar School		Old Leicestrians			
Leighton Park School		Old Leightonians			
Leeds Grammar School		Old Leodiensians			
Liverpool College		Old Lerpoolians			
The Leys School		Old Leysians			
The London Oratory School		Old Oratorians/London Oratorians			
The Cathedral School, Llandaff		Old Llandavians			
Llandovery College		Old Llandoverians			
Lord Williams's School, Thame		Old Tamensians	Refers to Thame		
Loretto School		Old Lorettonians			
Loughborough Grammar School		Old Loughburians			
Ludgrove School		Old Ludgrovians			
Lewis School, Pengam		Old Ludovicans	Ludovicus, the Latin version of the name 'Lewis'		
Lycée Français Charles de Gaulle	Private		previously Lycée Français de Londres		
Magdalen College School, Oxford		Old Waynfletes	After founder, William Waynflete		
Maidstone Grammar School		Old Maidstonians			
Malvern School		Old Malvernians			
Manchester Grammar School		Old Mancunians	Mancunia, a Latin name for Manchester		
Marlborough College		Old Marlburians			
Merchant Taylors' Boys' School, Crosby		Old Crosbeians			
Merchant Taylors' School, Northwood		Old Merchant Taylors			
Merchiston Castle School		Merchistonians			
Midhurst Grammar School		Old Midhurstians			
Millfield		Old Millfieldians			
Mill Hill School		Old Millhillians			
Monkton Combe School		Old Monktonians			
Monkwearmouth School		Old Monkwearmuthians			
Mount Radford School		Old Radfordians			
North London Collegiate School		Old North Londoners			
Northampton School for Boys		Old Northamptonians			
Norton Knatchbull School		Old Ashfordians	From Ashford Grammar School, the previous name of the school		
Norwich School		Old Norvicensians	From Norvic, Latin name of Norwich		
Nottingham High School		Old Nottinghamians			
Oakham School		Old Oakhamians			
Old Swinford Hospital		Old Foleyans	After founder, Thomas Foley		
Oldham Hulme Grammar School		Oldham Hulmeians			
The Oratory School		Old Oratorians			
Oswestry School		Old Oswestrians			
Oundle School		Old Oundelians			
Pangbourne College		Old Pangbournians			
Pate's Grammar School		Old Patesians			
The Perse School		Old Perseans			
Peter Symonds College		Old Symondians			
Pierrepont School, Frensham		Old Pierrepontians			
Pocklington School		Old Pocklingtonians			
Port Regis School		Old Portregians			
The Portsmouth Grammar School		Old Portmuthians			
Portora Royal School		Old Portorans			
The Prebendal School		Old Prebendalians			
Princethorpe College		Old Princethorpians			
Queen's College, London		Old Queens			
Queen's College, Taunton		Old Queenians			
Queen Elizabeth's Grammar School, Blackburn		Old Blackburnians			
Queen Elizabeth Grammar School, Wakefield		Old Savilians	After one of founders Thomas Saville (1591)		
Queen Elizabeth's Hospital		Old Elizabethans			
Queen Margaret's School, York		Old Margaretians			
Queen Mary's Grammar School	Grammar	Old Marians		Walsall	
Queenswood School		Old Queenswoodians			
Radley College		Old Radleians			
Ratcliffe College		Old Ratcliffians			
Ravenscroft School		Old Ravens			
Reading School		Old Redingensians			
Reed's School		Old Reedonians			
Reigate Grammar School		Old Reigatians			
Repton School		Old Reptonians			
Rendcomb College		Old Rendcombians			
Ripon Grammar School		Old Riponians			
Roedean School		Old Roedeanians			
Rossall School		Old Rossallians			
Royal Belfast Academical Institution		Old Instonians			
RGS Worcester		Old Elizabethans	Chartered by Queen Elizabeth I		
Royal Grammar School, Guildford		Old Guildfordians			
Royal Grammar School, Newcastle		Old Novocastrians	From Novocastria, Latin name of Newcastle		
Royal Grammar School, High Wycombe		Old Wycombiensians			
Royal Russell School		Old Russellians			
The Royal School, Armagh		Old Armachians			
The Royal School, Wolverhampton		Old Royals			
Rugby School		Old Rugbeians			
Ruthin School		Old Ruthinians			
Rutlish School		Old Rutlishians			
Rydal Penrhos		Old Rydalians			
Rye St Antony School		Old Girls of Rye			
Shrewsbury School		Old Salopians	From Salopia, the Latin for Shropshire		
Seaford College		Old Seafordians			
Sedbergh School		Old Sedberghians			
Sevenoaks School		Old Sennockians	"Sennock", a local pronunciation of "Sevenoaks"		
Sherborne School		Old Shirburnians			
Sir George Monoux College		Old Monovians			
Sir John Deane's College, Northwich		Old Wittonians	From Witton, an ancient name for Northwich		
Solihull School		Old Silhillians	Solihull demonym		
The Skinners' School		Old Skinners			
St Albans School, Hertfordshire		Old Albanians			
St Ambrose College	Grammar school	Old Ambrosians			
St Andrew's School, Pangbourne	Prep	Old St Andrews			
St Bees School		Old St Beghians	From Saint Bega		
St Benedict's School		Old Priorians	From school's original name, Ealing Priory School		
St Clement Danes School		Old Danes			
St Columba's College, St Albans		Old Columbans		St Albans	
St Dunstan's College		Old Dunstonians			
St Edward's School, Oxford		Old St Edwards			
St Faith's School		Old Fidelians	Fides, fidelis Latin for "faith"		
St George's College, Weybridge		Old Georgians		Weybridge	
St George's School, Harpenden		Old Georgians		Harpenden	
St Ignatius' College		Old Ignatians			
St Ivo School		Old Ivoans			
St John's College, Portsmouth		Old Johannians	Per Laborem Ad Honorem	Southsea, Portsmouth	
St John's School, Leatherhead		Old Johnians		Leatherhead	
St Lawrence College, Ramsgate		Old Lawrentians			
St Leonard's School		St Leonards School Seniors	Avoids term old boys		
St Olave's Grammar School		Old Olavians			
St Paul's School, London		Old Paulines			
St Paul's Girls' School		Old Paulinas			
St Peter's School, York		Old Peterites			
St Swithun's School, Winchester		Old Swithunites			
Stamford School		Old Stamfordians			
Stowe School		Old Stoics	A pun on the name of "Stowe" and the philosophy of Stoicism		
Stonyhurst College		Old Stonyhursts			
Stockport Grammar School		Old Stopfordians	"Stopfordian" means 'of Stockport'		
Strand School		Old Strandians			
Summer Fields School		Old Summerfieldians			
Sunningdale School		Old Sunningdalians			
Sutton Grammar School for Boys		Old Suttonians			
Sutton Valence School		Old SV	Abbreviation		
Taunton School		Old Tauntonians			
Tettenhall College		Old Tettenhallians			
Tonbridge School		Old Tonbridgians			
Trent College		Old Tridents	From Tridentum, the Latin name of Trent		
Trinity School of John Whitgift		Old Mid-Whitgiftians	The original name of Trinity School was Whitgift Middle School|		
Truro School		Old Truronians			
Twyford School		Old Twyfordians			
University College School		Old Gowers	After Gower Street, where it was located		
Upton Court Grammar School		Old Paludians	From Latin palus, a slough. See also Slough Grammar School		
Victoria College, Jersey		Old Victorians			
Uppingham School		Old Uppinghamians			
Wallington County Grammar School		Old Walcountians			
Warminster School		Old Verlucians	William Camden's identification of the Roman town of Verlucio with Warminster		
Watford Grammar School for Boys		Old Fullerians	After founder Elizabeth Fuller		
Warwick School		Old Warwickians			
Wells Cathedral School		Old Wellensians			
Wellingborough School		Old Wellingburians			
Wellington College, Berkshire		Old Wellingtonians			
West Buckland School		Old West Bucklands			
West Downs School		Old West Downs			Closed 1988
West Hill Park School		Old Westhillians			
Westcliff High School for Boys		Old Westcliffians			
Westminster School		Old Westminsters			
Whitgift School		Old Whitgiftians			
William Hulme's Grammar School		Old Hulmeians			
Wilson's School		Old Wilsonians			
Wimbledon College		Old Wimbledonians			
Wisbech Grammar School		Wisbech Old Grammarians			
Worksop College		Old Worksopians			
Wrekin College		Old Wrekinians			
Wolverhampton Grammar School		Old Wulfrunians	Wulfrunia, Latin for Wolverhampton		
Worth School		Old Worthians			
Wycliffe College (Gloucestershire)		Old Wycliffians			
Winchester College		Old Wykehamists	After founder William of Wykeham (1382)		
Woodhouse Grove School		Old Grovians			
Wycombe Abbey		Wycombe Abbey Seniors			
Yarm School		Old Yarumians	After the Viking name for Yarm, Yarum		

== See also ==
- Arthurian League – English football league for clubs comprising old boys
- Old boy network
- Old school tie
