= Counties 1 Midlands East (South) =

English Rugby Union league

- Current season or competition: 2025–26 Counties 1 Midlands East (South)
- Sport: Rugby union
- Instituted: 1992; 34 years ago (as Midlands East 1)
- Number of teams: 12
- Country: England
- Holders: Stamford (2024–25)
- Most titles: Northampton Old Scouts; Wellingborough (3 titles)
- Website: England RFU

Counties 1 Midlands East (South) (formerly Midlands 2 East (South)) is a level 7 English Rugby Union league and level 3 of the Midlands League, made up of teams from the southern part of the East Midlands region including sides from Bedfordshire, Leicestershire, Northamptonshire and occasionally Cambridgeshire and Oxfordshire. When this division began in 1992 it was known as Midlands East 1, until it was split into two regional divisions called Midlands 3 East (North) and Midlands 3 East (South) ahead of the 2000–01 season. Further restructuring of the Midlands leagues ahead of the 2009–10 season, saw it changed to Midlands 2 East (South) and post the RFU's Adult Competition Review, from season 2022–23 it adopted its current name.

The current champions are Stamford.

== Format ==
The champions and occasionally the runner-up is promoted to Regional 2 Midlands East. Teams are relegated to Counties 2 Midlands East (South); with the number of teams relegated depending on feedback following promotion and relegation in the leagues above.

The season runs from September to April and comprises twenty-two rounds of matches, with each club playing each of its rivals, home and away. The results of the matches contribute points to the league as follows:

- 4 points are awarded for a win
- 2 points are awarded for a draw
- 0 points are awarded for a loss, however
- 1 losing (bonus) point is awarded to a team that loses a match by 7 points or fewer
- 1 additional (bonus) point is awarded to a team scoring 4 tries or more in a match.

== 2026–27 ==
Departing were Hinckley 2XV promoted to Regional 2 Midlands East, whilst Stewarts & Lloyds (10th) and Dunstablians (12th) were relegated to Counties 2 Midlands East (South). Also departing were Biggleswade (11th) on a level transfer to Counties 1 Hertfordshire.

Team	Ground	Capacity	City/Area	Previous season
Bugbrooke	Camp Close		Bugbrooke, Northamptonshire	6th
Daventry	Daventry & District Sports Club		Daventry, Northamptonshire	Relegated from Regional 2 Midlands East
Leicester Forest	Hinckley Road		Leicester Forest East, Leicestershire	5th
Leighton Buzzard	Wright's Meadow		Leighton Buzzard, Buckinghamshire	Promoted from Counties 2 Midlands East (South)
Long Buckby	Station Road		Long Buckby, Northamptonshire	8th
Market Bosworth	Cadeby Lane		Market Bosworth, Leicestershire	9th
Newbold on Avon	Parkfield Road		Newbold-on-Avon, Warwickshire	2nd
Nuneaton Old Edwardians	Weddington Road		Nuneaton, Warwickshire	4th
Oundle II	Occupation Road		Oundle, Northamptonshire	Promoted from Counties 2 Midlands East (South)
Towcestrians	Greens Norton Road		Towcester, Northamptonshire	3rd
Vipers	Vipers Ground		Whetstone, Leicestershire	7th
Wellingborough	Cut Throat Lane		Great Doddington, Wellingborough, Northamptonshire	Relegated from Regional 2 Midlands East

Locations of the 2026–27 Counties 1 Midlands East (South) teams

== 2025–26 ==
=== Participating teams & locations ===
Departing were Stamford promoted to Regional 2 Midlands East, whilst Stockwood Park (10th), Peterborough Lions (11th) and Old Laurentians (12th) were relegated to Counties 2 Midlands East (South).

Also leaving were Bourne (8th) and Spalding (7th) who moved on a level transfer to Counties 1 Midlands East (North).

Team	Ground	Capacity	City/Area	Previous season
Biggleswade	Langford Road		Biggleswade, Bedfordshire	6th
Bugbrooke	Camp Close		Bugbrooke, Northamptonshire	5th
Dunstablians	Bidwell Park		Houghton Regis, Bedfordshire	Promoted from Counties 2 Midlands East (South) (2nd)
Hinckley 2XV	De Montfort Park	2,000	Hinckley, Leicestershire	Level transfer from Counties 1 Midlands East (North) (2nd)
Leicester Forest	Hinckley Road		Leicester Forest East, Leicestershire	Relegated from Regional 2 Midlands East
Long Buckby	Station Road		Long Buckby, Northamptonshire	Promoted from Counties 2 Midlands East (South) (champions)
Market Bosworth	Cadeby Lane		Market Bosworth, Leicestershire	Relegated from Regional 2 Midlands East
Newbold on Avon	Parkfield Road		Newbold-on-Avon, Warwickshire	4th
Nuneaton Old Edwardians	Weddington Road		Nuneaton, Warwickshire	Level transfer from Counties 1 Midlands East (North) (6th)
Stewarts & Lloyds	Occupation Road		Corby, Northamptonshire	9th
Towcestrians	Greens Norton Road		Towcester, Northamptonshire	3rd
Vipers	Vipers Ground		Whetstone, Leicestershire	2nd

Locations of the 2025–26 Counties 1 Midlands East (South) teams

== 2024–25 ==
Departing were Daventry and Market Bosworth, both promoted to Regional 2 Midlands East, whilst Oakham and Long Buckby were relegated to Counties 2 Midlands East (South). Joining were Newbold-on-Avon and Towcestrians, both relegated from Regional 2 Midlands East together with Stewarts & Lloyds and Biggleswade, both promoted from Counties 2 Midlands East (South).

=== Participating teams & locations ===
Team	Ground	Capacity	City/Area	Previous season
Biggleswade	Langford Road		Biggleswade, Bedfordshire	Promoted from Counties 2 Midlands East (South) (2nd)
Bourne	Milking Nook Drove		Bourne, Lincolnshire	4th
Bugbrooke	Camp Close		Bugbrooke, Northamptonshire	9th
Newbold-on-Avon	Parkfield Road		Newbold-on-Avon, Warwickshire	Relegated from Regional 2 Midlands East
Old Laurentians	Fenley Field		Rugby, Warwickshire	6th
Peterborough Lions	Bretton Woods		Bretton, Cambridgeshire	10th
Spalding	Memorial Field		Spalding, Lincolnshire	7th
Stamford	Hambleton Road		Stamford, Lincolnshire	3rd
Stewarts & Lloyds	Occupation Road		Corby, Northamptonshire	Promoted from Counties 2 Midlands East (South) (champions)
Stockwood Park	London Road		Luton, Bedfordshire	8th
Towcestrians	Greens Norton Road		Towcester, Northamptonshire	Relegated from Regional 2 Midlands East
Vipers	Vipers Ground		Whetstone, Leicestershire	5th

Locations of the 2024–25 Counties 1 Midlands East (South) teams

=== League table ===
2024–25 Counties 1 Midlands East (South)
		Played	Won	Drawn	Lost	Points for	Points against	Points diff	Try bonus	Loss bonus	Points	Pts adj
1	Stamford (P)	22	19	0	3	752	300	452	16	6	95	
2	Vipers	22	15	1	6	515	395	120	8	1	71	
3	Towcestrians	22	10	2	10	565	424	141	11	8	63	
4	Bugbrooke	22	11	2	9	617	560	57	11	3	62	
5	Newbold-on-Avon	22	12	0	10	508	561	−53	11	2	62	
6	Biggleswade	22	11	0	11	452	534	−82	6	2	52	
7	Spalding	22	11	4	7	451	417	34	8	4	49	−15
8	Bourne	22	10	1	11	464	480	−16	8	4	44	−10
9	Stewarts & Lloyds	22	9	2	11	485	550	−65	8	4	43	−5
10	Stockwood Park (R)	22	6	1	15	467	537	−70	6	7	39	
11	Peterborough Lions (R)	22	7	0	15	378	762	−384	5	2	35	
12	Old Laurentians (R)	22	4	1	17	390	524	−134	5	7	30	
If teams are level at any stage, tiebreakers are applied in the following order: 1. Number of matches won 2. Difference between points for and against 3. Total number of points for 4. Aggregate number of points scored in matches between tied teams 5. Number of matches won excluding the first match, then the second and so on until the tie is settled
Green background is the promotion place Pink background are the relegation places Updated: 8 December 2025

== 2023–24 ==
Departing were Wellingborough, promoted to Regional 2 Midlands East, whilst Dunstablians, St. Ives and Northampton Casuals were relegated to Counties 2 Midlands East (South). Joining were Peterborough Lions and Old Laurentians, both relegated from Regional 2 Midlands East together with Daventry and Spalding, both promoted from Counties 2 Midlands East (South).

=== Participating teams & locations ===
Team	Ground	Capacity	City/Area	Previous season
Bourne	Milking Nook Drove		Bourne, Lincolnshire	4th
Bugbrooke	Camp Close		Bugbrooke, Northamptonshire	7th
Daventry	Daventry & District Sports Club		Daventry, Northamptonshire	Promoted from Counties 2 Midlands East (South) (champions)
Long Buckby	Station Road		Long Buckby, Northamptonshire	8th
Market Bosworth	Cadeby Lane		Market Bosworth, Leicestershire	3rd
Oakham	Rutland Showground		Oakham, Rutland	9th
Old Laurentians	Fenley Field		Rugby, Warwickshire	Relegated from Regional 2 Midlands East
Peterborough Lions	Bretton Woods		Bretton, Cambridgeshire	Relegated from Regional 2 Midlands East
Spalding	Memorial Field		Spalding, Lincolnshire	Promoted from Counties 2 Midlands East (South) (2nd)
Stamford	Hambleton Road		Stamford, Lincolnshire	5th
Stockwood Park	London Road		Luton, Bedfordshire	6th
Vipers	Vipers Ground		Whetstone, Leicestershire	2nd

Locations of the 2023–24 Counties 1 Midlands East (South) teams

=== League table ===
2023–24 Counties 1 Midlands East (South)
		Played	Won	Drawn	Lost	Points for	Points against	Points diff	Try bonus	Loss bonus	Points	Pts adj
1	Daventry (P)	22	21	0	1	740	275	465	13	0	97	
2	Market Bosworth (P)	22	19	0	3	827	351	476	18	2	96	
3	Stamford	22	18	0	4	601	369	232	11	2	85	
4	Bourne	22	14	1	7	545	368	177	10	4	73	+1
5	Vipers	22	13	1	8	533	389	144	11	5	71	+1
6	Old Laurentians	22	11	0	11	485	556	−71	5	5	54	
7	Spalding	22	8	2	12	440	424	16	7	6	47	+2
8	Stockwood Park	22	7	0	15	431	667	−236	4	5	37	
9	Bugbrooke	22	6	0	16	412	603	−191	6	5	35	
10	Peterborough Lions	22	4	1	17	279	703	−424	4	2	22	−2
11	Long Buckby (R)	22	4	1	17	336	545	−209	5	3	21	−5
12	Oakham (R)	22	4	2	18	369	748	−379	2	2	20	−4
If teams are level at any stage, tiebreakers are applied in the following order: 1. Number of matches won 2. Difference between points for and against 3. Total number of points for 4. Aggregate number of points scored in matches between tied teams 5. Number of matches won excluding the first match, then the second and so on until the tie is settled
Green background is the promotion place Pink background are the relegation places Updated: 7 December 2025

== 2022–23 ==
This was the first season following the RFU Adult Competition Review with the league adopting its new name of Counties 1 Midlands East (South)).

=== Participating teams & locations ===
Team	Ground	Capacity	City/Area	Previous season
Bourne	Milking Nook Drove		Bourne, Lincolnshire	Promoted from Midlands 3 East (South) (3rd)
Bugbrooke	Camp Close		Bugbrooke, Northamptonshire	8th
Dunstablians	Bidwell Park		Houghton Regis, Bedfordshire	Promoted from Midlands 3 East (South) (2nd)
Long Buckby	Station Road		Long Buckby, Northamptonshire	6th
Market Bosworth	Cadeby Lane		Market Bosworth, Leicestershire	4th
Northampton Casuals	Rush Mills House		Northampton, Northamptonshire	11th
Oakham	Rutland Showground		Oakham, Rutland	12th
Stamford	Hambleton Road		Stamford, Lincolnshire	9th
St Ives	Somersham Road		St Ives, Cambridgeshire	10th
Stockwood Park	London Road		Luton, Bedfordshire	Promoted from Midlands 3 East (South) (champions)
Vipers	Vipers Ground		Whetstone, Leicestershire	5th
Wellingborough	Cut Throat Lane		Great Doddington, Wellingborough, Northamptonshire	7th

Locations of the 2022–23 Counties 2 Midlands East (South) teams

=== League table ===
2022–23 Counties 1 Midlands East (South)
		Played	Won	Drawn	Lost	Points for	Points against	Points diff	Try bonus	Loss bonus	Points	Pts adj
1	Wellingborough (P)	22	20	0	2	834	257	577	18	2	100	
2	Vipers	22	18	0	4	578	324	254	12	2	88	+2
3	Market Bosworth	22	16	0	6	599	322	277	13	4	83	+2
4	Bourne	22	17	0	5	536	366	170	9	3	76	−4
5	Stamford	22	13	0	9	561	435	126	10	5	67	
6	Stockwood Park	22	11	1	10	535	509	26	12	4	62	
7	Bugbrooke	22	8	2	12	449	505	−56	10	4	47	−3
8	Long Buckby	22	8	1	13	433	541	−108	9	3	41	−5
9	Oakham	22	7	1	14	415	589	−174	5	4	39	
10	St Ives (R)	22	5	1	16	321	641	−320	4	3	30	+1
11	Northampton Casuals (R)	22	5	0	17	286	644	−358	2	5	27	
12	Dunstablians (R)	22	0	2	20	231	645	−414	1	2	−8	−15
If teams are level at any stage, tiebreakers are applied in the following order: 1. Number of matches won 2. Difference between points for and against 3. Total number of points for 4. Aggregate number of points scored in matches between tied teams 5. Number of matches won excluding the first match, then the second and so on until the tie is settled
Green background is the promotion place Pink background are the relegation places Updated: 6 December 2025

== 2021–22 ==
=== Participating teams & locations ===
Team	Ground	Capacity	City/Area	Previous season
Bugbrooke	Camp Close		Bugbrooke, Northamptonshire	5th
Leicester Forest	Hinckley Road		Leicester Forest East, Leicestershire	3rd
Long Buckby	Station Road		Long Buckby, Northamptonshire	10th
Market Bosworth	Cadeby Lane		Market Bosworth, Leicestershire	4th
Northampton Casuals	Rush Mills House		Northampton, Northamptonshire	8th
Northampton Old Scouts	Rushmore Road		Northampton, Northamptonshire	6th
Oakham	Rutland Showground		Oakham, Rutland	Promoted from Midlands 3 East (South) (2nd)
Olney	East Street		Olney, Buckinghamshire	Relegated from Midlands 1 East (13th)
Stamford	Hambleton Road		Stamford, Lincolnshire	Promoted from Midlands 3 East (South) (champions)
St Ives	Somersham Road		St Ives, Cambridgeshire	9th
Vipers	Vipers Ground		Whetstone, Leicestershire	7th
Wellingborough	Cut Throat Lane		Great Doddington, Wellingborough, Northamptonshire	Relegated from Midlands 1 East (14th)

Locations of the 2021–22 Midlands 2 East (South) teams

== 2020–21 ==
Due to the COVID-19 pandemic, the 2020–21 season was cancelled.

== 2019–20 ==
=== Participating teams & locations ===
Team	Ground	Capacity	City/Area	Previous season
Belgrave	Belgrave Pastures		Belgrave, Leicester, Leicestershire	4th
Bugbrooke	Camp Close		Bugbrooke, Northamptonshire	6th
Leicester Forest	Hinckley Road		Leicester Forest East, Leicestershire	Promoted from Midlands 3 ES (champions)
Leighton Buzzard	Wright's Meadow		Leighton Buzzard, Bedfordshire	Relegated from Midlands 1 East (12th)
Long Buckby	Station Road		Long Buckby, Northamptonshire	7th
Market Bosworth	Cadeby Lane		Market Bosworth, Leicestershire	9th
Melton Mowbray	Melton Sports Village		Melton Mowbray, Leicestershire	Relegated from Midlands 1 East (14th)
Northampton Casuals	Rush Mills House		Northampton, Northamptonshire	Promoted from Midlands 3 ES (2nd)
Northampton Old Scouts	Rushmore Road		Northampton, Northamptonshire	Relegated from Midlands 1 East (13th)
Stewarts & Lloyds	Occupation Road		Corby, Northamptonshire	8th
St Ives	Somersham Road		St Ives, Cambridgeshire	3rd
Vipers	Vipers Ground		Whetstone, Leicestershire	10th

Locations of the 2019–20 Midlands 2 East (South) teams

== 2018–19 ==
=== Participating teams & locations ===
Team	Ground	Capacity	City/Area	Previous season
Belgrave	Belgrave Pastures		Belgrave, Leicester, Leicestershire	4th
Bugbrooke	Camp Close		Bugbrooke, Northamptonshire	Relegated from Midlands 1 East
Coalville	Memorial Ground		Coalville, Leicestershire	Level transfer from Midlands 2 West (North) (3rd)
Huntingdon & District	Huntingdon Racecourse		Brampton, Huntingdon, Cambridgeshire	Relegated from Midlands 1 East
Long Buckby	Station Road		Long Buckby, Northamptonshire	8th
Market Bosworth	Cadeby Lane		Market Bosworth, Leicestershire	7th
Market Harborough	The Rugby Ground		Market Harborough, Leicestershire	3rd
Oakham	Rutland Showground		Oakham, Rutland	9th
Olney	East Street		Olney, Buckinghamshire	6th
St Ives	Somersham Road		St Ives, Cambridgeshire	Promoted from Midlands 3 East (South) (champions)
Stewarts & Lloyds	Occupation Road		Corby, Northamptonshire	10th
Vipers	Vipers Ground		Whetstone, Leicestershire	Promoted from Midlands 3 East (South) (2nd)

Locations of the 2018–19 Midlands 2 East (South) teams

== 2017–18 ==
=== Participating teams & locations ===
Team	Ground	Capacity	City/Area	Previous season
Belgrave	Belgrave Pastures		Belgrave, Leicester, Leicestershire	7th
Long Buckby	Station Road		Long Buckby, Northamptonshire	Promoted from Midlands 3 East (South) (2nd)
Luton	Newlands Road		Luton, Bedfordshire	8th
Market Bosworth	Cadeby Lane		Market Bosworth, Leicestershire	Level transfer from Midlands 2 East (North) (9th)
Market Harborough	The Rugby Ground		Market Harborough, Leicestershire	9th
Oadby Wyggestonians	Oval Park		Oadby, Leicestershire	4th
Oakham	Rutland Showground		Oakham, Rutland	6th
Old Laurentians	Fenley Field		Rugby, Warwickshire	5th
Olney	East Street		Olney, Buckinghamshire	3rd
Pinley	Wyken Croft		Wyken, Coventry, West Midlands	Level transfer from Midlands 2 West (South) (7th)
Stamford	Hambleton Road		Stamford, Lincolnshire	10th
Stewarts & Lloyds	Occupation Road		Corby, Northamptonshire	Promoted from Midlands 3 East (South) (champions)

Locations of the 2017–18 Midlands 2 East (South) teams

== Teams 2016–17 ==
- Belgrave
- Luton
- Lutterworth
- Market Harborough
- Melton Mowbray
- Oadby Wanderers
- Oakham
- Old Laurentians (relegated from Midlands 1 East)
- Olney
- Oundale (promoted from Midlands 3 East (South))
- Peterborough
- Rushden & Higham
- Stamford (transferred from Midlands 2 East (North))
- Vipers

== Teams 2015–16 ==
- Belgrave (relegated from Midlands 1 East)
- Biggleswade
- Leicester Forest
- Lutterworth
- Market Harborough
- Melton Mowbray (promoted from Midlands 3 East (North))
- Oadby Wanderers
- Oakham
- Olney
- Peterborough
- Rushden & Higham (promoted from Midlands 3 East (South))
- Vipers (promoted from Midlands 3 East (South))

== Teams 2014–15 ==
- Biggleswade (promoted from Midlands 3 East (South))
- Dunstablians
- Leicester Forest
- Lutterworth
- Market Harborough
- Northampton Old Scouts
- Oadby Wyggestonians
- Oakham
- Olney
- Peterborough (relegated from Midlands 1 East)
- Stewarts & Lloyds (promoted from Midlands 3 East (South))
- Wellingborough

== Teams 2013–14 ==
- Dunstablians
- Leicester Forest
- Leighton Buzzard
- Lutterworth
- Market Harborough
- Newbold-on-Avon (transferred from Midlands 2 West (South))
- Northampton BBOB
- Northampton Old Scouts
- Oadby Wyggestonians
- Olney
- Rushden & Higham (promoted from Midlands 3 East (South))
- Wellingborough

== Teams 2012–13 ==
- Biggleswade (promoted from Midlands 3 East (South))
- Bugbrooke
- Dunstablians
- Huntingdon & District
- Leighton Buzzard (relegated from Midlands 1 East)
- Lutterworth
- Market Harborough
- Northampton BBOB (promoted from Midlands 3 East (South))
- Northampton Old Scouts
- Oadby Wyggestonians
- Vipers
- Wellingborough

After leading the division from matchday 1, Huntingdon & District were pipped to the title by Bugbrooke by way of bonus points on the season's final day. Huntingdon were promoted alongside Bugbrooke to Midlands 1 East following a playoff victory over the second placed team from Midlands 2 East (North), Oakham. Biggleswade joined Vipers in the relegation places following a final day defeat to Oadby Wyggestonians.

== Teams 2011–12 ==
- Bugbrooke
- Dunstablians
- Huntingdon
- Long Buckby
- Lutterworth
- Market Harborough
- Northampton Old Scouts
- Oadby Wygstonians
- Peterborough Lions
- Stockwood Park
- Vipers
- Wellingborough

== Teams 2010–11 ==
- Bugbrooke
- Huntingdon and District
- Leicester Forest
- Lutterworth
- Market Harborough
- Northampton BBOB
- Northampton Old Scouts
- Peterborough Lions
- Stewarts and Lloyds
- Stockwood Park
- Towcestrians
- Vipers

== Original teams ==
Teams in Midlands 2 East (North) and Midlands 2 East (South) were originally part of a single division called Midlands 1 East, which contained the following sides when it was introduced in 1992:

- Amber Valley - relegated from Midlands 2 East (9th)
- Ampthill - promoted from East Midlands/Leicestershire (5th)
- Belgrave - promoted from East Midlands/Leicestershire (3rd)
- Chesterfield Panthers - promoted from Nott, Lincs & Derbyshire 1 (champions)
- Dronfield - promoted from Nott, Lincs & Derbyshire 1 (5th)
- Hinckley - promoted from East Midlands/Leicestershire (champions)
- Luton - promoted from East Midlands/Leicestershire (4th)
- Mellish - promoted from Nott, Lincs & Derbyshire 1 (4th)
- Scunthorpe - relegated from Midlands 2 East (10th)
- Spalding - promoted from Nott, Lincs & Derbyshire 1 (runners up)
- Stewarts & Lloyds - relegated from Midlands 2 East (11th)
- Stoneygate - promoted from East Midlands/Leicestershire (runners up)
- West Bridgford - promoted from Nott, Lincs & Derbyshire 1 (3rd)

== Midlands 2 East (South) honours ==
=== Midlands East 1 (1992–1993) ===
Midlands 2 East (North) and Midlands 2 East (South) were originally part of a single tier 7 division called Midlands East 1. Promotion was to Midlands 2 and relegation to Midlands East 2 (Note: Midlands East 2 is currently split into two regional divisions – Midlands 4 East (North) and Midlands 4 East (South).).

Midlands East 1
Season	No of teams	Champions	Runners–up	Relegated teams	Reference
1992–93	13	Belgrave	Hinckley	Dronfield, West Bridford	
Green backgrounds are the promotion places.

=== Midlands East 1 (1993–1996) ===
The top six teams from Midlands 1 and the top six from North 1 were combined to create National 5 North, meaning that Midlands 1 East became a tier 8 league. Promotion and relegation continued to Midlands 2 and Midlands East 2.

Midlands East 1
Season	No of teams	Champions	Runners–up	Relegated teams	Reference
1993–94	13	Hinckley	Scunthorpe	Nottingham Moderns, Luton	
1994–95	13	Scunthorpe	Long Buckby	Chesterfield, Northampton BBOB, Wellingborough	
1995–96	13	Kettering	Huntingdon & District (Note: Due to the cancellation of National 5 North at the end of the season, four clubs were promoted including Ampthill and Long Buckby.)	No relegation (Note: Due to widespread restructuring caused by the cancellation of National 5 North there was no relegation.)	
Green backgrounds are the promotion places.

=== Midlands East 1 (1996–2000) ===
At the end of the 1995–96 season National 5 North was discontinued and Midlands East 1 returned to being a tier 7 league. Promotion and relegation continued to Midlands 2 and Midlands East 2.

Midlands East 1
Season	No of teams	Champions	Runners–up	Relegated teams	Reference
1996–97	17	Nottingham Moderns	Old Northamptonians	Northampton BBOB, Biggleswade, Amber Valley	
1997–98	17	Lincoln	Northampton Old Scouts	Ashbourne	
1998–99	17	Wellingborough	Dunstablians	Coalville, Vipers	
1999–00	17	Dunstablians	Luton	No relegation (Note: Due to the restructuring of the Midlands leagues for the following season, there was no relegation.)	
Green backgrounds are the promotion places.

=== Midlands 3 East (South) (2000–2009) ===
Restructuring ahead of the 2000–01 season saw Midlands East 1 split into two tier 7 regional leagues – Midlands 3 East (North) and Midlands 3 East (South). Promotion is to Midlands 2 East (formerly Midlands 2) and relegation to Midlands 4 East (South) (formerly Midlands East 2) (Note: Ahead of the 2000–01 Midlands East 2 was also split into two regional leagues – Midlands 4 East (North) and Midlands 4 East (South).).

Midlands 3 East (South)
Season	No of teams	Champions	Runners–up	Relegated teams	Reference
2000–01	10	South Leicester	Stewarts & Lloyds	Lutterworth, Old Northamptonians	
2001–02	10	Northampton Old Scouts	Stewarts & Lloyds	Vipers, Stockwood Park	
2002–03	10	Huntingdon & District	Peterborough	Long Buckby, Market Harborough	
2003–04	10	Old Northamptonians	Peterborough	No relegation (Note: No relegation as the division would be increased from 10 to 12 teams for the following season.)	
2004–05	12	Towcestrians	Stewarts & Lloyds	Stoneygate, Rushden & Higham	
2005–06	12	Northampton Old Scouts	Banbury	Stockwood Park	
2006–07	12	Ampthill	Banbury	Bugbrooke, Northampton Mens Own	
2007–08	12	Wellingborough	Leighton Buzzard	Daventry, Northampton Casuals	
2008–09	12	Old Northamptonians	Stewarts & Lloyds (Note: Due to the RFU restructuring the league system for the 2009-10 season, runners up Stewarts & Lloyds were automatically promoted as one of the two best runners up of the four Midlands 3 divisions, meaning they did not have to face a playoff.)	No relegation	
2009–10	12	Banbury	Market Harborough	Old Newtonians	
Green backgrounds are promotion places.

=== Midlands 2 East (South) (2009–present) ===
League restructuring by the RFU lead to Midlands 3 East (North) and Midlands 3 East (South) renamed as Midlands 2 East (North) and Midlands 2 East (South), with both leagues remaining at tier 7. Promotion is to Midlands 1 East (formerly Midlands 2 East) and relegation to Midlands 3 East (South) (formerly Midlands 4 East (South)).

Midlands 2 East (South)
Season	No of teams	Champions	Runners–up	Relegated teams	Reference
2010–11	12	Towcestrians	Peterborough Lions	Northampton BBOB, Stewarts & Lloyds	
2011–12	12	Peterborough Lions	Lutterworth	Long Buckby, Stockwood Park	
2012–13	12	Bugbrooke	Huntingdon & District	Vipers, Biggleswade	
2013–14	12	Leighton Buzzard	Newbold-on-Avon	Northampton BBOB, Rushden & Higham	
2014–15	12	Northampton Old Scouts	Wellingborough	Dunstablians, Stewarts & Lloyds	
2015–16	12	Melton Mowbray	Lutterworth	Biggleswade, Leicester Forest	
2016–17	12	Peterborough	Oundle	Rushden & Higham, Vipers	
2017–18	12	Oadby Wyggestonians	Luton	Pinley, Stamford	
2018–19	12	Olney	Market Harborough	Huntingdon & District, Oakham	
2019–20	12	Leighton Buzzard	Belgrave	Melton Mowbray, Stewarts & Lloyds	
2020–21	12	Cancelled due to COVID-19 pandemic in the United Kingdom.			
2021–22	12	Leicester Forest	Olney	Northampton Old Scouts (also promoted); No relegation	
Green backgrounds are promotion places.

=== Counties 1 Midlands East (South) (2022– ) ===
Following league reorganisation, Midland 2 East (South) is renamed Counties 1 Midlands East (South) and continues to be a tier 7 league. Promotion is to Regional 2 Midlands East and relegation to Counties 2 Midlands East (South)

Counties 1 Midland East (South)
Season	No of teams	No of matches	Champions	Runners-up	Relegated team(s)	Ref
2022–23	12	22	Wellingborough	Vipers	St Ives (10th), Northampton Casuals (11th) and Dunstablians (12th)	
2023–24	12	22	Daventry	Market Bosworth	Long Buckby (11th) and Oakham (12th)	
2024–25	12	22	Stamford	Vipers	Peterborough Lions (11th) and Old Laurentians(12th)	
Green background is the promotion place.

== Promotion play-offs ==
Since the 2000–01 season there has been a play-off between the runners-up of Midlands 2 East (North) and Midlands 2 East (South) for the third and final promotion place to Midlands 1 East (asides from 2008–09 which was played between the runners-up of Midlands 2 West (South) and Midlands 2 East (North) due to RFU restructuring). The team with the superior league record has home advantage in the tie. At the end of the 2019–20 season the Midlands 2 East (South) teams have ten wins to the Midlands 2 East (North) teams eight; and the home team has won promotion on thirteen occasions compared to the away teams five.

Midlands 2 East (North) v Midlands 2 East (South) promotion play-off results
Season	Home team	Score	Away team	Venue	Attendance/Ref
2000–01	Stewarts & Lloyds (S)	9–13	Ilkeston (N)	Occupation Road, Corby, Northamptonshire	
2001–02	Nottingham Moderns (N)	26–8	Stewarts & Lloyds (S)	Ferryfields, Wilford, Nottingham, Nottinghamshire	
2002–03	Peterborough (S)	3–59	Loughborough Students (N)	Fortress Fengate, Peterborough, Cambridgeshire	
2003–04	Peterborough (S)	33–13	Matlock (N)	Fortress Fengate, Peterborough, Cambridgeshire	
2004–05	Matlock (N)	25–10	Stewarts & Lloyds (S)	Cromford Meadows, Cromford, Derbyshire	
2005–06	Ilkeston (N)	24–21	Banbury (S)	The Stute, Ilkeston, Derbyshire	
2006–07	Lutterworth (N)	3–21	Banbury (S)	Ashby Lane, Lutterworth, Leicestershire	
2007–08	Leighton Buzzard (S)	16–15	Spalding (N)	Wright's Meadow, Leighton Buzzard, Bedfordshire	
2008–09	Promotion play-offs different for this season only. (Note: The 2008–09 promotion play-offs were different as the RFU was reorganizing the leagues across the country including the Midlands division. Usually the winners of each of the four regional divisions would go up automatically along with two of the runners-up who won their respective play-offs, meaning six teams were promoted. This year one extra was required to be promoted so the top two runners-up by league points – Bourneville (40) and Stewarts & Lloyds (40) went up – leaving the other two runners-up – Nuneaton Old Edwardians (34) and Spalding (38) – to compete for the final promotion spot.)				
2009–10	Spalding (N)	25–10	Market Harborough (S)	Memorial Field, Spalding, Lincolnshire	400
2010–11	Peterborough Lions (S)	17–20	Loughborough (N)	Bretton Woods, Peterborough, Cambridgeshire	
2011–12	Market Bosworth (S)	17–14	Lutterworth (N)	Cadeby Lane, Market Bosworth, Warwickshire	
2012–13	Huntingdon (S)	30–17	Oakham (N)	The Racecourse, Brampton, Cambridgeshire	
2013–14	Spalding (N)	24–14	Newbold-on-Avon (S)	Memorial Field, Spalding, Lincolnshire	400
2014–15	Coalville (N)	25–36	Wellingborough (S)	Memorial Ground, Coalville, Leicestershire	
2015–16	Lutterworth (S)	43–17	West Bridgford (N)	Ashby Lane, Lutterworth, Leicestershire	
2016–17	Oundle (S)	30–12	Coalville (N)	Occupation Road, Oundle, Northamptonshire	400
2017–18	Luton (S)	35-22	Matlock (N)	Newlands Road, Luton, Bedfordshire	
2018–19	Market Harborough (S)	25–21 (Note: after extra time.)	Dronfield (N)	Cadeby Lane, Market Bosworth, Leicestershire	
2019–20	Cancelled due to COVID-19 pandemic in the United Kingdom. Best ranked runner-up – Belgrave (S) – promoted instead.				
2020–21	Cancelled due to COVID-19 pandemic in the United Kingdom.				
2021–22	Cancelled due to league reorganisation.				
Green background is the promoted team. N = Midlands 2 East (North) (formerly Midlands 3 East (North)) and S = Midlands 2 East (South) (formerly Midlands 3 East (South))

== Number of league titles ==
Updated to 2024–25 season

- Northampton Old Scouts (3)
- Wellingborough (3) (Note: One of Wellingborough's titles was when the league was a single division known as Midlands East 1.)
- Leighton Buzzard (2)
- Old Northamptonians (2)
- Towcestrians (2)
- Ampthill (1)
- Banbury (1)
- Belgrave (1) (Note: Belgrave's title was when the league was a single division known as Midlands East 1.)
- Bugbrooke (1)
- Daventry (1)
- Dunstablians (1) (Note: Dunstablians title was when the league was a single division known as Midlands East 1.)
- Hinckley (1) (Note: Hinckley's title was when the league was a single division known as Midlands East 1.)
- Huntingdon & District (1)
- Kettering (1) (Note: Kettering's title was when the league was a single division known as Midlands East 1.)
- Leicester Forest (1)
- Lincoln (1) (Note: Lincoln's title was when the league was a single division known as Midlands East 1.)
- Melton Mowbray (1)
- Nottingham Moderns (1) (Note: Nottingham Moderns title was when the league was a single division known as Midlands East 1.)
- Oadby Wyggestonians (1)
- Olney (1)
- Peterborough (1)
- Peterborough Lions (1)
- Scunthorpe (1) (Note: Scunthorpe's title was when the league was a single division known as Midlands East 1.)
- South Leicester (1)
- Stamford (1)

== See also ==
- Midlands RFU
- East Midlands RFU
- Leicestershire RU
- English rugby union system
- Rugby union in England
