= Counties 1 Midlands East (North) =

English Rugby Union league

- Current season or competition: 2025–26 Counties 1 Midlands East (North)
- Sport: Rugby union
- Instituted: 1992; 34 years ago (as Midlands East 1)
- Number of teams: 12
- Country: England
- Holders: Belgrave (2024–25)
- Most titles: Belgrave and Hinckley. (3 titles)
- Website: England RFU

Counties 1 Midlands East (North) (formerly Midland 2 East (North)) is a level 7 English rugby union league and at level 3 of the Midlands League, made up of teams from the northern part of the East Midlands region, including clubs from Derbyshire, Lincolnshire, Nottinghamshire and the occasional team from Leicestershire. When this division began in 1992 it was known as Midlands East 1, until it was split into two regional divisions called Midlands 3 East (North) and Midlands 3 East (South) ahead of the 2000–01 season. Further restructuring of the Midlands leagues ahead of the 2009–10 season, saw it changed to Midlands 2 East (North) and post the RFU's Adult Competition Review, from season 2022–23 it adopted its current name

The current champions are Belgrave, who are promoted to Regional 2 Midlands North.

== Format ==
The first-placed team (or runner-up if a reserve team wins the league) is promoted to Regional 2 North Midlands. Teams are relegated to either Counties 2 Midlands East (North) or Counties 2 Midlands West (West), depending on location; with the number of teams relegated depending on feedback following promotion and relegation in the leagues above.

The season runs from September to April and comprises twenty-two rounds of matches, with each club playing each of its rivals, home and away. The results of the matches contribute points to the league as follows:

- 4 points are awarded for a win
- 2 points are awarded for a draw
- 0 points are awarded for a loss, however
- 1 losing (bonus) point is awarded to a team that loses a match by 7 points or fewer
- 1 additional (bonus) point is awarded to a team scoring 4 tries or more in a match.

== 2026–27 ==
Departing were Nottingham University, promoted to Regional 2 Midlands North while Kesteven (10th), Nottingham Moderns (11th) and Ashby (12th) were relegated to Counties 2 Midlands East (North).

=== Participating teams & locations ===
Team	Ground	Capacity	City/Area	Previous season
Belgrave	Belgrave Pastures		Belgrave, Leicester, Leicestershire	Relegated from Regional 2 Midlands (North) (12th)
Bourne	Milking Nook Drove		Bourne, Lincolnshire	4th
Keyworth	Willoughby Road		Widmerpool, Nottinghamshire	9th
Lincoln	Longdales Park		Lincoln, Lincolnshire	7th
Loughborough Students II	East Park	1,000	Loughborough, Leicestershire	3rd
Mansfield	Eakring Road	1,000	Mansfield, Nottinghamshire	Promoted from Counties 2 Midlands East (North)
Market Rasen & Louth	Willingham Road		Market Rasen, Lincolnshire	2nd
Mellish	War Memorial Ground		Arnold, Nottingham, Nottinghamshire	8th
Newark	The Rugby Ground	1,000 (60 seats)	Newark-on-Trent, Nottinghamshire	Relegated from Regional 2 Midlands (North) (11th)
Southwell	Pentelowes		Southwell, Nottinghamshire	6th
Spalding	Memorial Field		Spalding, Lincolnshire	5th
Syston II	Barkby Road		Queniborough, Leicestershire	Promoted from Counties 2 Midlands East (North)

Locations of the 2026–27 Counties 1 Midlands East (North) teams

== 2025–26 ==
Departing were Belgrave, promoted to Regional 2 Midlands North while Burton 2XV (12th) were relegated to Counties 2 Midlands West (West) together with Loughborough (10th) and Mansfield (11th), both relegated to Counties 2 Midlands East (North). Also leaving were Manor Park (8th) who returned on a level transfer to Counties 1 Midlands West (South), together with Nuneaton Old Edwardians (6th) and Hinckley 2XV (runner-up) who both moved on a level transfer to Counties 1 Midlands East (South).

=== Participating teams & locations ===
Team	Ground	Capacity	City/Area	Previous season
Ashby	Nottingham Road		Ashby-de-la-Zouch, Leicestershire	Promoted from Counties 2 Midlands East (North) (2nd)
Bourne	Milking Nook Drove		Bourne, Lincolnshire	Level transfer from Counties 1 Midlands East (South)
Kesteven	Woodnook		Grantham, Lincolnshire	7th
Keyworth	Willoughby Road		Widmerpool, Nottinghamshire	Promoted from Counties 2 Midlands East (North) (champions)
Lincoln	Longdales Park		Lincoln, Lincolnshire	5th
Loughborough Students II	East Park	1,000	Loughborough, Leicestershire	New entry
Market Rasen & Louth	Willingham Road		Market Rasen, Lincolnshire	3rd
Mellish	War Memorial Ground		Arnold, Nottingham, Nottinghamshire	Relegated from Regional 2 Midlands (North)
Nottingham Moderns	Ferryfields		Wilford, Nottingham, Nottinghamshire	9th
Nottingham University	Lady Bay Sports Ground		West Bridgford, Nottingham, Nottinghamshire	New entry
Southwell	Pentelowes		Southwell, Nottinghamshire	4th
Spalding	Memorial Field		Spalding, Lincolnshire	Level transfer from Counties 1 Midlands East (South)

Locations of the 2025–26 Counties 1 Midlands East (North) teams

== 2024–25 ==
Departing were Ilkeston, promoted to Regional 2 Midlands North as runners-up; Hinckley Staghounds (2XV) finished top but were not permitted to be promoted to level 6, owing to the league rules on reserve teams in the RFU leagues. Boston and Birstall were relegated to Counties 2 Midlands East (North). Joining were Kesteven and Nottingham Moderns promoted from Counties 2 Midlands East (North), whilst Manor Park moved on a level transfer from Counties 1 Midlands West (South).

=== Participating teams & locations ===
Team	Ground	Capacity	City/Area	Previous season
Belgrave	Belgrave Pastures		Belgrave, Leicester, Leicestershire	4th
Burton 2XV	Battlestead Croft, Tatenhill	5,500 (600 seats	Burton, Staffordshire	10th
Hinckley 2XV	De Montfort Park	2,000	Hinckley, Leicestershire	Champions (not promoted)
Kesteven	Woodnook		Grantham, Lincolnshire	Promoted from Midlands 3 East (North) (champions)
Lincoln	Longdales Park		Lincoln, Lincolnshire	3rd
Loughborough	Derby Road Playing Fields		Loughborough, Leicestershire	6th
Manor Park	Griff & Coton		Nuneaton, Warwickshire	Level transfer from Counties 1 Midlands West (South) (5th)
Mansfield	Eakring Road	1,000	Mansfield, Nottinghamshire	8th
Market Rasen & Louth	Willingham Road		Market Rasen, Lincolnshire	5th
Nottingham Moderns	Ferryfields		Wilford, Nottingham, Nottinghamshire	Promoted from Midlands 3 East (North) (2nd)
Nuneaton Old Edwardians	Weddington Road		Nuneaton, Warwickshire	7th
Southwell	Pentelowes		Southwell, Nottinghamshire	9th

Locations of the 2024–25 Counties 1 Midlands East (North) teams

=== League table ===
2024–25 Counties 1 Midlands East (North)
		Played	Won	Drawn	Lost	Points for	Points against	Points diff	Try bonus	Loss bonus	Points	Pts adj
1	Belgrave (P)	22	20	0	2	581	272	309	15	1	98	−2
2	Hinckley II	22	18	0	4	860	379	481	18	3	93	
3	Market Rasen & Louth	22	14	1	7	659	446	213	15	4	78	+1
4	Southwell	22	14	0	8	683	475	208	15	1	72	
5	Lincoln	22	12	0	10	695	652	43	14	3	65	
6	Nuneaton Old Edwardians	22	12	0	10	543	454	89	12	4	59	−5
7	Kesteven	22	10	1	11	588	519	69	11	5	58	
8	Manor Park	22	10	0	12	550	634	−84	9	3	52	
9	Nottingham Moderns	22	8	0	14	404	716	−312	6	2	40	
10	Loughborough (R)	22	7	0	15	382	680	−298	6	4	38	
11	Mansfield (R)	22	4	0	18	359	690	−331	3	5	24	
12	Burton II (R)	22	2	0	20	363	750	−387	3	5	16	
If teams are level at any stage, tiebreakers are applied in the following order: 1. Number of matches won 2. Difference between points for and against1 3. Total number of points for 4. Aggregate number of points scored in matches between tied teams 5. Number of matches won excluding the first match, then the second and so on until the tie is settled
Green background is the promotion place Pink background are the relegation places Updated: 1 December 2025

== 2023–24 ==
Departing were Mellish, promoted to Regional 2 Midlands North as runners-up (Hinckley Staghounds (2XV) finished top but were not permitted to be promoted on Level 6 owing to league rules on reserve teams in the RFU leagues). Ashbourne and Ashby and were relegated to Counties 2 Midlands East (North) whilst Coalville dropped to Counties 2 Midlands West (East).

Joining were Belgrave and Nuneaton Old Edwardians, both relegated from Regional 2 Midlands North, whilst Boston and Mansfield were both promoted from Counties 2 Midlands East (North).

=== Participating teams & locations ===
Team	Ground	Capacity	City/Area	Previous season
Belgrave	Belgrave Pastures		Belgrave, Leicester, Leicestershire	Relegated from Regional 2 Midlands North (11th)
Birstall	Co-Op Sports Ground		Birstall, Leicestershire	9th
Boston	Princess Royal Sports Arena	2,000	Boston, Lincolnshire	Promoted from Midlands 3 East (North)
Burton 2XV	Battlestead Croft, Tatenhill	5,500 (600 seats	Burton, Staffordshire	8th
Hinckley 2XV	De Montfort Park	2,000	Hinckley, Leicestershire	Champions (not promoted)
Ilkeston	The Stute		Ilkeston, Derbyshire	5th
Lincoln	Longdales Park		Lincoln, Lincolnshire	4th
Loughborough	Derby Road Playing Fields		Loughborough, Leicestershire	3rd
Mansfield	Eakring Road	1,000	Mansfield, Nottinghamshire	Promoted from Midlands 3 East (North)
Market Rasen & Louth	Willingham Road		Market Rasen, Lincolnshire	6th
Nuneaton Old Edwardians	Weddington Road		Nuneaton, Warwickshire	Relegated from Regional 2 Midlands North (12th)
Southwell	Pentelowes		Southwell, Nottinghamshire	7th

Locations of the 2023–24 Counties 1 Midlands East (North) teams

=== League table ===
2023–24 Counties 1 Midlands East (North)
		Played	Won	Drawn	Lost	Points for	Points against	Points diff	Try bonus	Loss bonus	Points	Pts adj
1	Hinckley II (C)	22	21	0	1	1003	264	739	18	1	104	+1
2	Ilkeston (P)	22	18	0	4	924	303	621	19	3	95	+1
3	Lincoln	22	17	0	5	835	483	352	18	0	86	
4	Belgrave	22	15	0	7	581	468	113	14	2	76	
5	Market Rasen & Louth	22	12	1	9	494	427	67	10	2	64	−2
6	Loughborough	22	10	1	11	508	548	−40	9	4	55	
7	Nuneaton Old Edwardian	22	10	0	12	561	703	−142	12	3	55	
8	Mansfield	22	9	1	12	471	613	−142	6	4	48	
9	Southwell	22	6	1	15	422	675	−253	6	3	35	
10	Burton II	22	6	0	16	381	644	−263	4	5	33	
11	Boston (R)	22	5	0	17	245	685	−440	2	2	10	−14
12	Birstall (R)	22	1	0	21	212	824	−612	0	1	−5	−10
If teams are level at any stage, tiebreakers are applied in the following order: 1. Number of matches won 2. Difference between points for and against 3. Total number of points for 4. Aggregate number of points scored in matches between tied teams 5. Number of matches won excluding the first match, then the second and so on until the tie is settled
Green background is the promotion place Pink background are the relegation places Updated: 30 November 2025

== 2022–23 ==
This was the first season following the RFU Adult Competition Review with the league adopting its new name of Counties 1 Midlands East (North).

Departing were Long Eaton, Melbourne, Matlock and Newark – all promoted to Regional 2 Midlands North. Joining were Mellish and Birstall, both promoted from Midlands 3 East (North), together with Burton 2XV and Hinckley 2XV, both new entries.

=== Participating teams & locations ===
Team	Ground	Capacity	City/Area	Previous season
Ashbourne	Recreation Ground		Ashbourne, Derbyshire	10th
Ashby	Nottingham Road		Ashby-de-la-Zouch, Leicestershire	11th
Birstall	Co-Op Sports Ground		Birstall, Leicestershire	Promoted from Midlands 3 East (North) (2nd)
Burton 2XV	Battlestead Croft, Tatenhill	5,500 (600 seats	Burton, Staffordshire	New entry
Coalville	Memorial Ground		Coalville, Leicestershire	12th
Hinckley 2XV	De Montfort Park	2,000	Hinckley, Leicestershire	New entry
Ilkeston	The Stute		Ilkeston, Derbyshire	5th
Lincoln	Longdales Park		Lincoln, Lincolnshire	6th
Loughborough	Derby Road Playing Fields		Loughborough, Leicestershire	7th
Market Rasen & Louth	Willingham Road		Market Rasen, Lincolnshire	9th
Mellish	War Memorial Ground		Arnold, Nottingham, Nottinghamshire	Promoted from Midlands 3 East (North) (champions)
Southwell	Pentelowes		Southwell, Nottinghamshire	8th

Locations of the 2022–23 Counties 1 Midlands East (North) teams

=== League table ===
2022–23 Counties 1 Midlands East (North)
		Played	Won	Drawn	Lost	Points for	Points against	Points diff	Try bonus	Loss bonus	Points	Pts adj
1	Hinckley II (C)	22	21	0	1	838	285	553	18	1	104	+1
2	Mellish (P)	22	17	0	5	631	424	207	15	1	84	
3	Loughborough	22	17	0	5	483	355	128	12	1	83	+2
4	Lincoln	22	15	0	7	707	348	359	14	2	76	
5	Ilkeston	22	14	0	8	607	397	210	12	2	70	
6	Market Rasen & Louth	22	10	0	12	565	482	83	13	3	56	
7	Southwell	22	9	0	13	402	561	−159	6	2	45	+1
8	Burton II	22	7	0	15	476	586	−110	10	6	44	
9	Birstall	22	7	1	14	410	496	−86	4	5	39	
10	Ashbourne (R)	22	7	0	15	339	695	−356	3	3	34	
11	Ashby (R)	22	5	1	16	358	568	−210	3	4	29	
12	Coalville (R)	22	2	0	20	239	858	−619	2	2	12	
If teams are level at any stage, tiebreakers are applied in the following order: 1. Number of matches won 2. Difference between points for and against 3. Total number of points for 4. Aggregate number of points scored in matches between tied teams 5. Number of matches won excluding the first match, then the second and so on until the tie is settled
Green background is the promotion place Pink background are the relegation places Updated: 29 November 2025

== 2021–22 ==
=== Participating teams & locations ===
Team	Ground	Capacity	City/Area	Previous season
Ashbourne	Recreation Ground		Ashbourne, Derbyshire	9th
Ashby	Nottingham Road		Ashby-de-la-Zouch, Leicestershire	Promoted from Midlands 2 EN (champions)
Coalville	Memorial Ground		Coalville, Leicestershire	3rd
Ilkeston	The Stute		Ilkeston, Derbyshire	7th
Lincoln	Longdales Park		Lincoln, Lincolnshire	10th
Long Eaton	West Park	1,000	Long Eaton, Derbyshire	5th
Loughborough	Derby Road Playing Fields		Loughborough, Leicestershire	8th
Market Rasen & Louth	Willingham Road		Market Rasen, Lincolnshire	4th
Matlock	Cromford Meadows		Cromford, Matlock, Derbyshire	2nd
Melbourne	Cockshut Lane	2,000	Melbourne, Derbyshire	Relegated from Midlands 1 East (12th)
Newark	The Rugby Ground	1,000 (60 seats)	Newark-on-Trent, Nottinghamshire	6th
Southwell	Pentelowes		Southwell, Nottinghamshire	Promoted from Midlands 2 EN (2nd)

Locations of the 2021–22 Midlands 2 East (North) teams

== 2020–21 ==
Due to the COVID-19 pandemic, the 2020–21 season was cancelled.

== 2019–20 ==
=== Participating teams & locations ===
Team	Ground	Capacity	City/Area	Previous season
Ashbourne	Recreation Ground		Ashbourne, Derbyshire	4th
Ashfield	Polly Bowls Sports Ground		Sutton in Ashfield, Nottinghamshire	Promoted from Midlands 3 EN (2nd)
Coalville	Memorial Ground		Coalville, Leicestershire	Transferred from Midlands 2 East (South)
Dronfield	Gosforth Fields		Dronfield Woodhouse, Dronfield, Derbyshire	Runners up (lost playoff)
Ilkeston	The Stute		Ilkeston, Derbyshire	10th
Lincoln	Longdales Park		Lincoln, Lincolnshire	7th
Long Eaton	West Park	1,000	Long Eaton, Derbyshire	3rd
Loughborough	Derby Road Playing Fields		Loughborough, Leicestershire	6th
Market Rasen & Louth	Willingham Road		Market Rasen, Lincolnshire	5th
Matlock	Cromford Meadows		Cromford, Matlock, Derbyshire	9th
Newark	The Rugby Ground	1,000 (60 seats)	Newark-on-Trent, Nottinghamshire	8th
Nottingham Casuals	Weir Field Recreation Ground		Beeston, Nottingham, Nottinghamshire	Promoted from Midlands 3 EN (champions)

Locations of the 2019–20 Midlands 2 East (North) teams

== 2018–19 ==
=== Participating teams & locations ===
Team	Ground	Capacity	City/Area	Previous season
Ashbourne	Recreation Ground		Ashbourne, Derbyshire	7th
Ashby	Nottingham Road		Ashby-de-la-Zouch, Leicestershire	Promoted from Midlands 3 East (North) (2nd)
Dronfield	Gosforth Fields		Dronfield Woodhouse, Dronfield, Derbyshire	5th
Ilkeston	The Stute		Ilkeston, Derbyshire	9th
Lincoln	Longdales Park		Lincoln, Lincolnshire	6th
Long Eaton	West Park	1,000	Long Eaton, Derbyshire	Promoted from Midlands 3 East (North) (champions)
Loughborough	Derby Road Playing Fields		Loughborough, Leicestershire	10th
Market Rasen & Louth	Willingham Road		Market Rasen, Lincolnshire	Relegated from Midlands 1 East (14th)
Matlock	Cromford Meadows		Cromford, Matlock, Derbyshire	2nd (lost play-off)
Melbourne	Cockshut Lane	2,000	Melbourne, Derbyshire	Relegated from Midlands 1 West (12th)
Newark	The Rugby Ground	1,000 (60 seats)	Newark-on-Trent, Nottinghamshire	4th
Southwell	Pentelowes		Southwell, Nottinghamshire	8th

Locations of the 2018–19 Midlands 2 East (North) teams

== 2017–18 ==
=== Participating teams & locations ===
Team	Ground	Capacity	City/Area	Previous season
Ashbourne	Recreation Ground		Ashbourne, Derbyshire	3rd
Bakewell Mannerians	Lady Manners School		Bakewell, Derbyshire	Promoted from Midlands 3 East (North) (2nd)
Coalville	Memorial Ground		Coalville, Leicestershire	2nd (lost promotion play-off)
Dronfield	Gosforth Fields		Dronfield Woodhouse, Dronfield, Derbyshire	Relegated from Midlands 1 East (13th)
Ilkeston	The Stute		Ilkeston, Derbyshire	Relegated from Midlands 1 East (14th)
Lincoln	Longdales Park		Lincoln, Lincolnshire	Promoted from Midlands 3 East (North) (champions)
Loughborough	Derby Road Playing Fields		Loughborough, Leicestershire	7th
Matlock	Cromford Meadows		Cromford, Matlock, Derbyshire	4th
Newark	The Rugby Ground	1,000 (60 seats)	Newark-on-Trent, Nottinghamshire	6th
Nottingham Casuals	Weir Field Recreation Ground		Beeston, Nottingham, Nottinghamshire	10th
Southwell	Pentelowes		Southwell, Nottinghamshire	5th
West Bridgford	The Memorial Ground		West Bridgford, Nottinghamshire	8th

Locations of the 2017–18 Midlands 2 East (North) teams

== 2016–17 teams ==
- Ashbourne
- Coalville
- Kesteven (promoted from Midlands 3 East (North))
- Loughborough (promoted from Midlands 3 East (North))
- Market Bosworth
- Matlock (relegated from Midlands 1 East)
- Melbourne
- Newark (relegated from Midlands 1 East)
- Nottingham Casuals
- Southwell
- Spalding
- West Bridgford

== 2015–16 teams ==
- Ashbourne
- Bakewell Mannerians
- Coalville
- Dronfield
- Mansfield (relegated from Midlands 1 East)
- Market Bosworth
- Melbourne
- Nottingham Casuals
- Southwell (promoted from Midlands 3 East (North))
- Spalding (relegated from Midlands 1 East)
- Stamford
- West Bridgford

== 2014–15 teams ==
- Ashbourne
- Ashby (promoted from Midlands 3 East (North))
- Bakewell Mannerians
- Coalville (relegated from Midlands 1 East)
- Dronfield
- Loughborough
- Market Bosworth (relegated from Midlands 1 West)
- Matlock (relegated from Midlands 1 East)
- Melbourne
- Nottingham Casuals
- Stamford
- West Bridgford (promoted from Midlands 3 East (North))

== 2013–14 teams ==
- Ashbourne
- Bakewell Mannerians
- Belgrave
- Dronfield
- Kesteven (promoted from Midlands 3 East (North))
- Loughborough (relegated from Midlands 1 East)
- Melbourne (promoted from Midlands 3 East (North))
- Melton Mowbray
- Nottingham Casuals
- Oakham
- Spalding
- Stamford

== 2012–13 teams ==
- Ashbourne
- Aylestone St James
- Bakewell Mannerians
- Belgrave
- Coalville
- Dronfield
- Kesteven
- Leicester Forest
- Melton Mowbray
- Nottingham Casuals
- Nuneaton Old Edwardians
- Oakham
- Sleaford

== 2011–12 teams ==
- Ashbourne
- Aylestone St James
- Bakewell Mannerians
- Belgrave
- Leicester Forest
- Market Bosworth RFC
- Melton Mowbray
- Newark
- Nottingham Casuals
- Nottingham Moderns
- Oakham
- West Bridgford

== 2010–11 teams ==
- Ashby
- Aylestone St James
- Bakewell Mannerians
- Belgrave
- Lincoln
- Loughborough
- Market Bosworth
- Market Rasen and Louth
- Melton Mowbray
- Nottingham Moderns
- Oakham
- West Bridgford

Market Rasen and Louth have won the league this season and are promoted to Midlands 1 East as champions for the season 2011–12. Loughborough finished second and also gained promotion by beating Peterborough Lions, who placed 2nd in Midlands 2 East (South) in the promotion play-off. Lincoln and Ashby finished in the bottom two positions and have therefore been relegated for the coming season.

== Original teams ==
Teams in Midlands 2 East (North) and Midlands 2 East (South) were originally part of a single division called Midlands 1 East, which contained the following sides when it was introduced in 1992:

- Amber Valley – relegated from Midlands 2 East (9th)
- Ampthill – promoted from East Midlands/Leicestershire (5th)
- Belgrave – promoted from East Midlands/Leicestershire (3rd)
- Chesterfield Panthers – promoted from Nott, Lincs & Derbyshire 1 (champions)
- Dronfield – promoted from Nott, Lincs & Derbyshire 1 (5th)
- Hinckley – promoted from East Midlands/Leicestershire (champions)
- Luton – promoted from East Midlands/Leicestershire (4th)
- Mellish – promoted from Nott, Lincs & Derbyshire 1 (4th)
- Scunthorpe – relegated from Midlands 2 East (10th)
- Spalding – promoted from Nott, Lincs & Derbyshire 1 (2nd)
- Stewarts & Lloyds – relegated from Midlands 2 East (11th)
- Stoneygate – promoted from East Midlands/Leicestershire (2nd)
- West Bridgford – promoted from Nott, Lincs & Derbyshire 1 (3rd)

== Midlands 2 East (North) honours ==
=== Midlands East 1 (1992–1993) ===
Midlands 2 East (North) and Midlands 2 East (South) were originally part of a single tier 7 division called Midlands East 1. Promotion was to Midlands 2 and relegation to Midlands East 2. (Note: Midlands East 2 is currently split into two regional divisions – Midlands 4 East (North) and Midlands 4 East (South).)

Midlands East 1
Season	No of teams	Champions	Runners–up	Relegated teams	Reference
1992–93	13	Belgrave	Hinckley	Dronfield, West Bridford	
Green backgrounds are the promotion places.

=== Midlands East 1 (1993–1996) ===
The top six teams from Midlands 1 and the top six from North 1 were combined to create National 5 North, meaning that Midlands 1 East became a tier 8 league. Promotion and relegation continued to Midlands 2 and Midlands East 2.

Midlands East 1
Season	No of teams	Champions	Runners–up	Relegated teams	Reference
1993–94	13	Hinckley	Scunthorpe	Nottingham Moderns, Luton	
1994–95	13	Scunthorpe	Long Buckby	Chesterfield, Northampton BBOB, Wellingborough	
1995–96	13	Kettering	Huntingdon & District (Note: Due to the cancellation of National 5 North at the end of the season, four clubs were promoted including Ampthill and Long Buckby.)	No relegation (Note: Due to widespread restructuring caused by the cancellation of National 5 North there was no relegation.)	
Green backgrounds are the promotion places.

=== Midlands East 1 (1996–2000) ===
At the end of the 1995–96 season National 5 North was discontinued and Midlands East 1 returned to being a tier 7 league. Promotion and relegation continued to Midlands 2 and Midlands East 2.

Midlands East 1
Season	No of teams	Champions	Runners–up	Relegated teams	Reference
1996–97	17	Nottingham Moderns	Old Northamptonians	Northampton BBOB, Biggleswade, Amber Valley	
1997–98	17	Lincoln	Northampton Old Scouts	Ashbourne	
1998–99	17	Wellingborough	Dunstablians	Coalville, Vipers	
1999–00	17	Dunstablians	Luton	No relegation (Note: Due to the restructuring of the Midlands leagues for the following season, there was no relegation.)	
Green backgrounds are the promotion places.

=== Midlands 3 East (North) (2000–2009) ===
Restructuring ahead of the 2000–01 season saw Midlands East 1 split into two tier 7 regional leagues – Midlands 3 East (North) and Midlands 3 East (South). Promotion was now to Midlands 2 East (formerly Midlands 2) and relegation to Midlands 4 East (North) (formerly Midlands East 2). (Note: Ahead of the 2000–01 Midlands East 2 was also split into two regional leagues – Midlands 4 East (North) and Midlands 4 East (South).)

Midlands East 3 (North)
Season	No of teams	Champions	Runners–up	Relegated teams	Reference
2000–01	10	Spalding	Ilkeston	Paviors, Long Eaton, Oadby Wyggestonians	
2001–02	10	Market Bosworth	Nottingham Moderns	Market Rasen & Louth	
2002–03	10	Newark	Loughborough Students	Lincoln	
2003–04	10	Melton Mowbray	Matlock	No relegation (Note: No relegation as the division would be increased from 10 to 12 teams for the following season.)	
2004–05	12	Paviors	Matlock	West Bridgford, Mellish	
2005–06	12	Melton Mowbray	Ilkeston	Ashfield, Grimsby	
2006–07	12	Syston	Lutterworth	Ashbourne, Belgrave	
2007–08	12	Mansfield	Spalding	Oakham, Grimsby	
2008–09	12	Ilkeston	Spalding	No relegation	
Green backgrounds are promotion places.

=== Midlands 2 East (North) (2009–present) ===
League restructuring by the RFU meant that Midlands 3 East (North) and Midlands 3 East (South) were renamed as Midlands 2 East (North) and Midlands 2 East (South), with both leagues remaining at tier 7. Promotion was now to Midlands 1 East (formerly Midlands 2 East) and relegation to Midlands 3 East (North) (formerly Midlands 4 East (North)).

Midlands 2 East (North)
Season	No of teams	Champions	Runners–up	Relegated teams	Reference
2009–10	12	Coalville	Spalding	Grimsby and Sleaford	
2010–11	12	Market Rasen & Louth	Loughborough	Ashby and Lincoln	
2011–12	12	Newark	Market Bosworth	Nottingham Moderns and West Bridgford	
2012–13	11	Coalville	Oakham	Aylestone St James	
2013–14	12	Belgrave	Spalding	Melton Mowbray and Kesteven	
2014–15	12	Matlock	Coalville	Ashby and Loughborough	
2015–16	12	Dronfield	West Bridgford	Bakewell Mannerians and Mansfield	
2016–17	12	Melbourne	Coalville	Spalding and Kesteven	
2017–18	12	West Bridgford	Matlock	Nottingham Casuals and Bakewell Mannerians (Note: Bakewell Mannerians dropped out of the league part way through the season and were relegated in bottom spot.)	
2018–19	12	Melbourne	Dronfield	Ashby and Southwell	
2019–20	12	Dronfield	Matlock	Ashfield and Nottingham Casuals	
2020–21	14	Cancelled due to COVID-19 pandemic in the United Kingdom.			
2021–22	14	Long Eaton	Melbourne	Matlock and Newark (also promoted); No relegation	
Green backgrounds are promotion places.

=== Counties 1 Midlands East (North) (2022– ) ===
Following league reorganisation, Midland 2 East (North) is renamed Counties 1 Midlands East (North) and continues to be a tier 7 league. Promotion is to Regional 2 North Midlands and relegation to either Counties 2 Midlands East (North) or Counties 2 Midlands West (West), depending on location.

Counties 1 Midland East (North)
Season	No of teams	No of matches	Champions	Runners-up	Relegated team(s)	Ref
2022–23	12	22	Hinckley II	Mellish	Ashbourne (10th), Ashby (11th) and Coalville (12th)	
2023–24	11	20	Hinckley II	Ilkeston	Boston (11th) and Birstall (12th)	
2024–25	12	22	Belgrave	Hinckley II	Loughborough (10th), Mansfield (11th) and Burton II (12th)	
Green background is the promotion place.

== Promotion play-offs ==
Since the 2000–01 season there has been a play-off between the runners-up of Midlands 2 East (North) and Midlands 2 East (South) for the third and final promotion place to Midlands 1 East (aside from 2008–09 which was played between the runners-up of Midlands 2 West (South) and Midlands 2 East (North) due to RFU restructuring). The team with the superior league record had home advantage in the tie. At the end of the 2019–20 season the Midlands 2 East (South) teams have ten wins to the Midlands 2 East (North) teams eight; and the home team won promotion on thirteen occasions compared to the away teams five.

Midlands 2 East (North) v Midlands 2 East (South) promotion play-off results
Season	Home team	Score	Away team	Venue	Attendance/ Ref
2000–01	Stewarts & Lloyds (S)	9–13	Ilkeston (N)	Occupation Road, Corby, Northamptonshire	
2001–02	Nottingham Moderns (N)	26–8	Stewarts & Lloyds](S)	Ferryfields, Wilford, Nottingham, Nottinghamshire	
2002–03	Peterborough (S)	3–59	Loughborough Students (N)	Fortress Fengate, Peterborough, Cambridgeshire	
2003–04	Peterborough (S)	33–13	Matlock (N)	Fortress Fengate, Peterborough, Cambridgeshire	
2004–05	Matlock (N)	25–10	Stewarts & Lloyds (S)	Cromford Meadows, Cromford, Derbyshire	
2005–06	Ilkeston (N)	24–21	Banbury (S)	The Stute, Ilkeston, Derbyshire	
2006–07	Lutterworth (N)	3–21	Banbury (S)	Ashby Lane, Lutterworth, Leicestershire	
2007–08	Leighton Buzzard (S)	16–15	Spalding (N)	Wright's Meadow, Leighton Buzzard, Bedfordshire	
2008–09	Promotion play-off different for this season only (see below). (Note: The 2008–09 promotion playoffs were different as the RFU was reorganizing the leagues across the country including the Midlands division. Usually the winners of each of the four regional divisions would go up automatically along with two of the runners-up who won their respective play-offs, meaning six teams were promoted. This year one extra was required to be promoted so the top two runners-up by league points – Bourneville (40) and Stewarts & Lloyds (40) went up – leaving the other two runners-up – Nuneaton Old Edwardians (34) and Spalding (38) – to compete for the final promotion spot.)				
2009–10	Spalding (N)	25–10	Market Harborough (S)	Memorial Field, Spalding, Lincolnshire	400
2010–11	Peterborough Lions (S)	17–20	Loughborough (N)	Bretton Woods, Peterborough, Cambridgeshire	
2011–12	Market Bosworth (S)	17–14	Lutterworth (N)	Cadeby Lane, Market Bosworth, Warwickshire	
2012–13	Huntingdon (S)	30–17	Oakham (N)	The Racecourse, Brampton, Cambridgeshire	
2013–14	Spalding (N)	24–14	Newbold on Avon (S)	Memorial Field, Spalding, Lincolnshire	400
2014–15	Coalville (N)	25–36	Wellingborough (S)	Memorial Ground, Coalville, Leicestershire	
2015–16	Lutterworth (S)	43–17	West Bridgford (N)	Ashby Lane, Lutterworth, Leicestershire	
2016–17	Oundle (S)	30–12	Coalville (N)	Occupation Road, Oundle, Northamptonshire	400
2017–18	Luton (S)	35–22	Matlock (N)	Newlands Road, Luton, Bedfordshire	
2018–19	Market Harborough (S)	25-21 (Note: after extra time.)	Dronfield (N)	Cadeby Lane, Market Bosworth, Leicestershire	
2019–20	Cancelled due to COVID-19 pandemic in the United Kingdom. Best ranked runner-up – Belgrave (S) – promoted.				
2020–21	Cancelled due to COVID-19 pandemic in the United Kingdom.				
2021–22	Cancelled due to league reorganisation.				
Green background is the promoted team. N = Midlands 2 East (North) (formerly Midlands 3 East (North)) and S = Midlands 2 East (South) (formerly Midlands 3 East (South))

=== 2008–09 promotion play-off ===
As mentioned above the 2008–09 promotion play-off in Midlands 3 were different due to RFU restructuring for the following season. The two runners-up with the worst league records in the four regional divisions at this level played each other for the final promotion spot, with the team with the superior league record having home advantage.

Midlands 2 West (South) v Midlands 2 East (North) promotion play-off results
Season	Home team	Score	Away team	Venue	Ref
2008–09	Spalding (N)	12–14	Nuneaton Old Edwardians (S)	Memorial Field, Spalding, Lincolnshire	
Green background is the promoted team. S = Midlands 2 West (South) (formerly Midlands 3 West (South)) and N = Midlands 2 East (North) (formerly Midlands 3 West (North))

== Number of league titles ==
- Belgrave (3)
- Hinckley (3) (Note: Hinckley's One by the first team and two by the reseves.)
- Coalville (2)
- Dronfield (2)
- Melbourne (2)
- Melton Mowbray (2)
- Newark (2)
- Dunstablians (1)
- Ilkeston (1)
- Kettering (1)
- Lincoln (1)
- Long Eaton (1)
- Mansfield (1)
- Market Bosworth (1)
- Market Rasen & Louth (1)
- Matlock (1)
- Nottingham Moderns (1)
- Paviors (1)
- Scunthorpe (1)
- Spalding (1)
- Syston (1)
- Wellingborough (1)
- West Bridgford (1)

== See also ==
- Midlands RFU
- Leicestershire RU
- Notts, Lincs & Derbyshire RFU
- English rugby union system
- Rugby union in England
