= Regional 2 East Midlands =

English rugby union regional league

Regional 2 Midlands East
- Current season or competition: 2025–26 Regional 2 Midlands East
- Sport: Rugby union
- Instituted: 1987; 39 years ago (as Midlands 2 East)
- Number of teams: 12
- Country: England
- Holders: Northampton Old Scouts (2025–26)
- Most titles: Bedford Athletic, Syston (4 titles)
- Website: England RFU

Regional 2 Midlands East is an English level 6 rugby union regional league for rugby clubs in the eastern region of the Midlands, including sides from Buckinghamshire, Cambridgeshire, Leicestershire, Northamptonshire, Warwickshire and occasionally Bedfordshire, Derbyshire, Lincolnshire, Nottinghamshire, Oxfordshire, Staffordshire and Worcestershire. When this division began in 1987 it was known as Midlands 2 East, and has been restructured several times, most notably as a single division known as Midlands 2 between 1992 and 2000, and Midlands 1 East before regionalising again to its present format with the new name of Regional 2 Midlands East as part of England Rugby's Future Competition Structure change at the start of the 2022–23 season. Northampton Old Scouts are the 2025–26 champions.

== Structure and format ==
The twelve teams play home and away matches from September through to April, making a total of twenty-two matches each. The results of the matches contribute points to the league as follows:

- 4 points are awarded for a win
- 2 points are awarded for a draw
- 0 points are awarded for a loss, however
- 1 losing (bonus) point is awarded to a team that loses a match by 7 points or fewer
- 1 additional (bonus) point is awarded to a team scoring 4 tries or more in a match

There is one automatic promotion place and two relegation places. The champions and runner-up are promoted to Regional 1 Midlands (formerly Midlands Premier). The last two teams are relegated teams to either Counties 1 Midlands East (North) or Counties 1 Midlands East (South), depending on geographic location.

== 2026–27 ==
=== Participating teams and locations ===
Eight teams played in last seasons competition. Departing were Northampton Old Scouts (champions) and Broadstreet (3rd – play off winners), promoted to Regional 1 South East and Regional 1 Midlands respectively, while Daventry (11th) and Wellingborough were relegated to Counties 1 Midlands East (South).

Incoming teams were Nuneaton relegated from Regional 1 Midlands (12th), Shelford relegated from Regional 1 South East (12th) together with Old Saltleians on a level transfer from Regional 2 North Midlands (10th) and Hinckley 2XV promoted as winners of Counties 1 Midlands East (South).

Team	Ground	Capacity	City/Area	Previous season
Bedford Athletic	Putnoe Woods	500	Bedford, Bedfordshire	4th
Hinckley 2XV	De Montfort Park	2,000	Hinckley, Leicestershire	Promoted from Counties 1 Midlands East (South) (champions)
Kettering	Waverley Road		Kettering, Northamptonshire	7th
Market Harborough	The Rugby Ground		Market Harborough, Leicestershire	2nd
Nuneaton	Liberty Way	3,800 (500 seats)	Nuneaton, Warwickshire	Relegated from Regional 1 Midlands (12th)
Oadby Wyggestonians	Oval Park		Oadby, Leicestershire	8th
Old Coventrians	Tile Hill Lane		Tile Hill, Coventry, West Midlands	10th
Old Saltleians	Watton Lane		Water Orton, Warwickshire	Level transfer from Regional 2 North Midlands (10th)
Olney	East Street		Olney, Buckinghamshire	9th
Peterborough	Fortress Fengate		Peterborough, Cambridgeshire	5th
Shelford	The Davey Field	2,000 (150 seats)	Great Shelford, Cambridgeshire	Relegated from Regional 1 South East (12th)
Stamford	Hambleton Road		Stamford, Lincolnshire	6th

Locations of the 2026–27 Regional 2 Midlands East teams

== 2025–26 ==
=== Participating teams and locations ===
Departing were Lutterworth, promoted to Regional 1 Midlands, while Leicester Forest (12th) and Market Bosworth (11th) were relegated to Counties 1 Midlands East (South). Promoted into the league were Old Coventrians, 2nd in Counties 1 Midlands West (South) and Stamford, champions of Counties 1 Midlands East (South).

Team	Ground	Capacity	City/Area	Previous season
Bedford Athletic	Putnoe Woods	500	Bedford, Bedfordshire	Relegated from Regional 1 South East (12th)
Broadstreet	Ivor Preece Field	1,500 (250 seats)	Binley Woods, Coventry, West Midlands	7th
Daventry	Daventry & District Sports Club		Daventry, Northamptonshire	9th
Kettering	Waverley Road		Kettering, Northamptonshire	10th
Market Harborough	The Rugby Ground		Market Harborough, Leicestershire	3rd
Northampton Old Scouts	Rushmere Road		Northampton, Northamptonshire	2nd
Oadby Wyggestonians	Oval Park		Oadby, Leicestershire	6th
Old Coventrians	Tile Hill Lane		Tile Hill, Coventry, West Midlands	Promoted from Counties 1 Midlands West (South) (2nd)
Olney	East Street		Olney, Buckinghamshire	4th
Peterborough	Fortress Fengate		Peterborough, Cambridgeshire	5th
Stamford	Hambleton Road		Stamford, Lincolnshire	Promoted from Counties 1 Midlands East (South) (champions)
Wellingborough	Cut Throat Lane		Great Doddington, Wellingborough, Northamptonshire	8th

Locations of the 2025-26 Regional 2 Midlands East teams

=== League table ===
Regional 2 Midlands East 2025–26
	Team	Played	Won	Drawn	Lost	Points for	Points against	Points diff	Try bonus	Loss bonus	Pts	Pts adj.
1	Northampton Old Scouts (P)	22	19	0	3	880	446	434	18	1	96	−1 pt
2	Market Harborough	22	18	1	3	951	285	666	18	1	93	
3	Broadstreet (P)	22	17	1	4	830	422	408	17	2	89	
4	Bedford Athletic	22	16	0	6	789	550	239	16	1	81	
5	Peterborough	22	12	2	8	805	571	234	16	2	70	
6	Stamford	22	11	2	9	565	606	−41	14	2	64	
7	Kettering	22	10	0	12	575	537	38	12	1	53	
8	Oadby Wyggestonians	22	7	1	14	527	712	−185	9	5	44	
9	Olney	22	7	0	15	582	753	−171	12	4	44	
10	Old Coventrians	22	5	0	17	430	965	−535	9	3	27	−5 pts
11	Daventry (R)	22	4	1	17	414	819	−405	7	2	27	
12	Wellingborough (R)	22	2	0	20	350	1032	−682	4	1	13	
If teams are level at any stage, tiebreakers are applied in the following order: 1. Number of matches won 2. Difference between points for and against 3. Total number of points for 4. Aggregate number of points scored in matches between tied teams 5. Number of matches won excluding the first match, then the second and so on until the tie is settled
Updated: 4 May 2026; Source:
Mint background is the promotion place (1st); Green background are the promotion play-off places (2nd–5th); Pink background are the relegation play-off places (10th–11th); Salmon background is the relegation place (12th)

=== Play-offs ===
Regional 2 promotion play-offs

18 April 2026

Market Harborough	7 – 20	Peterborough RUFC

The Rugby Ground,
Market Harborough

18 April 2026

Broadstreet	29 – 22	Bedford Athletic

Ivor Preece Field,
Binley Woods

Round 2

25 April 2026

Broadstreet	61 – 26	Peterborough RUFC

Ivor Preece Field,
Binley Woods

Regional 2 Midlands West v Regional 2 Midlands East play-off

2 May 2026

Stow-on-the-Wold	38 – 54	Broadstreet

Oddington Road
Stow-on-the-Wold

Regional 1 Accession Final

9 May 2026

Drybrook	31 – 42	Broadstreet

Mannings Ground, Drybrook

- Broadstreet promoted

Regional 2 relegation play-off

25 April 2026

Old Coventrians	52 – 35	Daventry

Tile Hill
Tile Hill, Coventry

- Daventry relegated.

== 2024–25 ==
=== Participating teams and locations ===
Departing were Nuneaton, promoted to Regional 1 Midlands whilst Newbold on Avon and Towcestrians were relegated. Joining were Broadstreet, relegated from Regional 1 Midlands together with Daventry and Market Bosworth both promoted from Counties 1 Midlands East (South).

Team	Ground	Capacity	City/Area	Previous season
Broadstreet	Ivor Preece Field	1,500 (250 seats)	Binley Woods, Coventry, West Midlands	Relegated from Regional 1 Midlands (12th)
Daventry	Daventry & District Sports Club		Daventry, Northamptonshire	Promoted from Counties 1 Midlands East (South) (champions)
Kettering	Waverley Road		Kettering, Northamptonshire	5th
Leicester Forest	Hinckley Road		Leicester Forest East, Leicestershire	7th
Lutterworth	Ashby Lane		Lutterworth, Leicestershire	2nd
Market Bosworth	Cadeby Lane		Market Bosworth, Leicestershire	Promoted from Counties 1 Midlands East (South) {runner-up)
Market Harborough	The Rugby Ground		Market Harborough, Leicestershire	3rd
Northampton Old Scouts	Rushmere Road		Northampton, Northamptonshire	4th
Oadby Wyggestonians	Oval Park		Oadby, Leicestershire	10th
Olney	East Street		Olney, Buckinghamshire	6th
Peterborough	Fortress Fengate		Peterborough, Cambridgeshire	8th
Wellingborough	Cut Throat Lane		Great Doddington, Wellingborough, Northamptonshire	9th

Locations of the 2024–25 Regional 2 Midlands East teams

=== League table ===
Regional 2 Midlands East 2024–25
	Team	Played	Won	Drawn	Lost	Points for	Points against	Points diff	Try bonus	Loss bonus	Points
1	Lutterworth (P)	22	22	0	0	832	340	492	19	0	107
2	Northampton Old Scouts	22	17	1	4	870	482	388	18	2	90
3	Market Harborough	22	18	0	4	596	353	243	10	2	84
4	Olney	22	11	2	9	561	587	−26	12	3	63
5	Peterborough	22	10	0	12	620	670	−50	14	4	58
6	Oadby Wyggestonians	22	9	0	13	634	638	−4	12	6	54
7	Broadstreet	22	9	0	13	579	652	−73	10	3	49
8	Wellingborough	22	8	0	14	472	492	−20	8	7	47
9	Daventry	22	8	0	14	434	524	−90	4	6	42
10	Kettering	22	7	0	15	450	650	−200	6	6	40
11	Market Bosworth	22	6	0	15	431	766	−335	9	3	38
12	Leicester Forest	22	5	0	17	447	772	−325	11	3	34
If teams are level at any stage, tiebreakers are applied in the following order: 1. Number of matches won 2. Difference between points for and against 3. Total number of points for 4. Aggregate number of points scored in matches between tied teams 5. Number of matches won excluding the first match, then the second and so on until the tie is settled
Green background is the promotion place. Pink background are the relegation places Updated: 25 October 2025; Source: "Regional 2 Midlands East". Market Harborough RUFC.

== 2023–24 ==
=== Participating teams and locations ===
Departing were Old Northamptonians, promoted to Regional 1 South East while Peterborough Lions and Old Laurentians were relegated. Leighton Buzzard, 10th the previous season, were level transferred to Regional 2 Thames. Joining were Nuneaton, relegated from Regional 1 Midlands, Oadby Wyggestonians and Leicester Forest both on a level transfer from Regional 2 Midlands North and Wellingborough promoted from Counties 1 Midlands East (South).

Team	Ground	Capacity	City/Area	Previous season
Kettering	Waverley Road		Kettering, Northamptonshire	7th
Leicester Forest	Hinckley Road		Leicester Forest East, Leicestershire	Level transfer from Regional 2 North Midlands (9th)
Lutterworth	Ashby Lane		Lutterworth, Leicestershire	2nd
Market Harborough	The Rugby Ground		Market Harborough, Leicestershire	4th
Newbold on Avon	Parkfield Road		Newbold-on-Avon, Warwickshire	8th
Northampton Old Scouts	Rushmere Road		Northampton, Northamptonshire	3rd
Nuneaton	Liberty Way	4,314 (514 seats)	Nuneaton, Warwickshire	Relegated from Regional 1 Midlands (12th)
Oadby Wyggestonians	Oval Park		Oadby, Leicestershire	Level transfer from Regional 2 North Midlands (8th)
Olney	East Street		Olney, Buckinghamshire	6th
Peterborough	Fortress Fengate		Peterborough, Cambridgeshire	5th
Towcestrians	Greens Norton Road		Towcester, Northamptonshire	9th
Wellingborough	Cut Throat Lane		Great Doddington, Wellingborough, Northamptonshire	Promoted from Counties 1 Midlands East (South)

Locations of the 2023–24 Regional 2 Midlands East teams

=== League table ===
Regional 2 Midlands East 2023–24
	Team	Played	Won	Drawn	Lost	Points for	Points against	Points diff	Try bonus	Loss bonus	Points
1	Nuneaton (P)	22	19	0	3	980	397	583	20	3	99
2	Lutterworth	22	18	1	3	868	363	505	18	2	94
3	Market Harborough	22	18	1	3	712	327	385	15	0	89
4	Northampton Old Scouts	22	16	3	3	854	355	499	16	0	86
5	Kettering	22	12	0	10	517	561	−44	10	1	59
6	Olney	22	9	0	13	635	671	−36	14	2	52
7	Leicester Forest	22	8	1	13	544	640	−96	9	2	45
8	Peterborough	22	7	0	15	507	588	−81	7	9	44
9	Wellingborough	22	9	0	13	438	591	−153	6	1	43
10	Oadby Wyggestonians	22	7	0	15	522	783	−261	7	3	38
11	Newbold on Avon	22	4	0	18	326	920	−594	4	0	20
12	Towcestrians	22	2	0	20	347	1054	−707	6	2	16
If teams are level at any stage, tiebreakers are applied in the following order: 1. Number of matches won 2. Difference between points for and against 3. Total number of points for 4. Aggregate number of points scored in matches between tied teams 5. Number of matches won excluding the first match, then the second and so on until the tie is settled
Green background is the promotion place. Pink background are the relegation places Updated: 1 January 2025; Source: "Regional 2 Midlands East". England Rugby.

== 2022–23 ==
=== Participating teams and locations ===
This was the first season following the RFU Adult Competition Review with the league rebranded as Regional 2 Midlands East.

Team	Ground	Capacity	City/Area	Previous season
Kettering	Waverley Road		Kettering, Northamptonshire	8th Midlands 1 East
Leighton Buzzard	Wright's Meadow		Leighton Buzzard, Buckinghamshire	13th London 1 North
Lutterworth	Ashby Lane		Lutterworth, Leicestershire	11th Midlands 1 East
Market Harborough	The Rugby Ground		Market Harborough, Leicestershire	6th Midlands 1 East
Newbold on Avon	Parkfield Road		Newbold-on-Avon, Warwickshire	6th Midlands 1 West
Northampton Old Scouts	Rushmere Road		Northampton, Northamptonshire	3rd Midlands 2 East (South)
Old Laurentians	Fenley Field		Rugby, Warwickshire	4th Midlands 2 West (South)
Old Northamptonians	Sir Humphrey Cripps Pavilion		Northampton, Northamptonshire	7th Midlands 1 East
Olney	East Street		Olney, Buckinghamshire	2nd Midlands 2 East (South)
Peterborough	Fortress Fengate		Peterborough, Cambridgeshire	4th Midlands 1 East
Peterborough Lions	Bretton Woods		Bretton, Cambridgeshire	13th Midlands 1 East
Towcestrians	Greens Norton Road		Towcester, Northamptonshire	12th Midlands 1 East

Locations of the 2021–22 Midlands 1 East teams

=== League table ===
Regional 2 East Midlands 2022–23
	Team	Played	Won	Drawn	Lost	Points for	Points against	Points diff	Try bonus	Loss bonus	Points	Points deducted
1	Old Northamptonians (P)	20	19	0	1	753	284	260	15	0	91	
2	Lutterworth	22	16	0	6	680	331	349	14	4	82	
3	Northampton Old Scouts	22	15	0	7	719	427	292	14	4	78	
4	Market Harborough	22	16	0	6	464	311	153	7	3	76	
5	Peterborough	21	14	0	7	597	391	206	12	1	69	
6	Olney	22	12	0	10	562	604	−42	11	3	62	
7	Kettering	22	10	0	12	409	470	−61	6	4	51	
8	Newbold on Avon	21	9	0	12	429	580	−151	9	1	46	
9	Towcestrians	22	8	0	14	380	678	−298	7	1	40	
10	Leighton Buzzard	22	7	0	15	397	536	−139	6	5	39	
11	Old Laurentians (R)	22	2	0	20	326	689	−363	3	3	14	
12	Peterborough Lions (R)	22	2	0	22	286	701	−415	5	2	0	−15
If teams are level at any stage, tiebreakers are applied in the following order: 1. Number of matches won 2. Difference between points for and against 3. Total number of points for 4. Aggregate number of points scored in matches between tied teams 5. Number of matches won excluding the first match, then the second and so on until the tie is settled
Green background is the promotion place. Pink background are the relegation places Updated: 26 June 2023; Source: "Regional 2 East Midlands". England Rugby.

== 2021–22 ==
=== Participating teams and locations ===
The teams competing in 2021-22 achieved their places in the league based on performances in 2019-20, the 'previous season' column in the table below refers to that season not 2020-21.

Team	Ground	Capacity	City/Area	Previous season
Bedford Athletic	Putnoe Woods	500	Bedford, Bedfordshire	Relegated from London & South East Premier (13th)
Belgrave	Belgrave Pastures		Belgrave, Leicester, Leicestershire	Promoted from Midlands 2 East (South) (runners-up)
Derby	Haslams Lane		Derby, Derbyshire	3rd
Dronfield	Gosforth Fields		Dronfield Woodhouse, Dronfield, Derbyshire	Promoted from Midlands 2 East (North) (champions)
Kettering	Waverley Road	2,000	Kettering, Northamptonshire	Relegated from Midlands Premier (12th)
Lutterworth	Ashby Lane		Lutterworth, Leicestershire	7th
Market Harborough	The Rugby Ground		Market Harborough, Leicestershire	8th
Oadby Wyggestonians	Oval Park		Oadby, Leicestershire	5th
Old Northamptonians	Sir Humphrey Cripps Pavilion		Northampton, Northamptonshire	6th
Peterborough	Fortress Fengate		Peterborough, Cambridgeshire	10th
Peterborough Lions	Bretton Woods		Bretton, Cambridgeshire	Relegated from Midlands Premier (13th)
Rugby Lions	Webb Ellis Road	4,000 (200 seats)	Rugby, Warwickshire	9th
Towcestrians	Greens Norton Road		Towchester, Northamptonshire	11th
West Bridgford	The Memorial Ground		West Bridgford, Nottinghamshire	4th

Locations of the 2021–22 Midlands 1 East teams

== 2020–21 ==
On 30 October 2020 the RFU announced that due to the coronavirus pandemic a decision had been taken to cancel Adult Competitive Leagues (National League 1 and below) for the 2020/21 season meaning Midlands 1 East was not contested.

== 2019–20 ==
=== Participating teams and locations ===
Team	Ground	Capacity	City/Area	Previous season
Derby	Haslams Lane		Derby, Derbyshire	Relegated from Midlands Premier (14th)
Lutterworth	Ashby Lane		Lutterworth, Leicestershire	6th
Market Harborough	The Rugby Ground		Market Harborough, Leicestershire	Promoted from Midlands 2 East (South) (playoff)
Melbourne	Cockshut Lane	2,000	Melbourne, Derbyshire	Promoted from Midlands 2 East (North) (champions)
Oadby Wyggestonians	Oval Park		Oadby, Leicestershire	3rd
Olney	East Street		Olney, Buckinghamshire	Promoted from Midlands 2 East (South) (champions)
Old Northamptonians	Sir Humphrey Cripps Pavilion		Northampton, Northamptonshire	8th
Oundale	Occupation Road	1,000	Oundle, Northamptonshire	5th
Peterborough	Fortress Fengate		Peterborough, Cambridgeshire	4th
Rugby Lions	Webb Ellis Road	4,000 (200 seats)	Rugby, Warwickshire	11th
Syston	Barkby Road		Queniborough, Leicestershire	Relegated from Midlands Premier (12th)
Towcestrians	Greens Norton Road		Towchester, Northamptonshire	7th
Wellingborough	Cut Throat Lane		Great Doddington, Wellingborough, Northamptonshire	10th
West Bridgford	The Memorial Ground		West Bridgford, Nottinghamshire	9th

Locations of the 2019–20 Midlands 1 East teams

== 2018–19 ==
=== Participating teams and locations ===
Team	Ground	Capacity	City/Area	Previous season
Kettering	Waverley Road	2,000	Kettering, Northamptonshire	3rd
Leighton Buzzard	Wright's Meadow		Leighton Buzzard, Bedfordshire	11th
Lutterworth	Ashby Lane		Lutterworth, Leicestershire	5th (Midlands 1 West - level transfer)
Melton Mowbray	Melton Sports Village		Melton Mowbray, Leicestershire	8th
Northampton Old Scouts	Rushmere Road		Northampton, Northamptonshire	9th
Oadby Wyggestonians	Oval Park		Oadby, Leicestershire	Promoted from Midlands 2 East (South) (champions)
Old Northamptonians	Sir Humphrey Cripps Pavilion		Northampton, Northamptonshire	5th
Oundale	Occupation Road	1,000	Oundle, Northamptonshire	7th
Paviors	The Ron Rossin Ground		Nottingham, Nottinghamshire	5th
Peterborough	Fortress Fengate		Peterborough, Cambridgeshire	6th
Rugby Lions	Webb Ellis Road	4,000 (200 seats)	Rugby, Warwickshire	Level transfer from Midlands 1 West (11th)
Towcestrians	Greens Norton Road		Towchester, Northamptonshire	Relegated from London & SE Premier (14th)
Wellingborough	Cut Throat Lane		Great Doddington, Wellingborough, Northamptonshire	10th
West Bridgford	The Memorial Ground		West Bridgford, Nottinghamshire	Promoted from Midlands 2 East (North) (champions)

Locations of the 2018–19 Midlands 1 East teams

== 2017–18 ==
=== Participating teams and locations ===
Team	Ground	Capacity	City/Area	Previous season
Bedford Athletic	Putnoe Woods	500	Bedford, Bedfordshire	Relegated from National 3 Midlands (13th)
Bugbrooke	Camp Close		Bugbrooke, Northamptonshire	9th
Huntingdon & District	Huntingdon Racecourse		Brampton, Huntingdon, Cambridgeshire	5th
Kettering	Waverley Road	2,000	Kettering, Northamptonshire	2nd (lost playoff)
Leighton Buzzard	Wright's Meadow		Leighton Buzzard, Bedfordshire	10th
Market Rasen & Louth	Willingham Road		Market Rasen, Lincolnshire	7th
Melton Mowbray	Melton Sports Village		Melton Mowbray, Leicestershire	6th
Northampton Old Scouts	Rushmore Road		Northampton, Northamptonshire	11th
Old Northamptonians	Sir Humphrey Cripps Pavilion		Northampton, Northamptonshire	3rd
Oundle	Occupation Road	1,000	Oundle, Northamptonshire	Promoted from Midlands 2 East (South) (playoffs)
Paviors	The Ron Rossin Ground		Nottingham, Nottinghamshire	8th
Peterborough	Fortress Fengate		Peterborough, Cambridgeshire	Promoted from Midlands 2 East (South) (champions)
Syston	Barkby Road		Queniborough, Leicestershire	Relegated from National 3 Midlands (14th)
Wellingborough	Cut Throat Lane		Great Doddington, Wellingborough, Northamptonshire	12th (reprieve from RFU)

Locations of the 2017–18 Midlands 1 East teams

== 2016–17 ==
- Bugbooke
- Dronfield (promoted from Midlands 2 East (North))
- Huntingdon & District
- Ilkeston
- Kettering
- Leighton Buzzard
- Lutterworth (promoted from Midlands 2 East (North))
- Market Rasen & Louth
- Melton Mowbray (promoted from Midlands 2 East (North))
- Newbold-on-Avon (promoted from Midlands 2 West (South))
- Northampton Old Scouts
- Old Northamptonians (relegated from National League 3 Midlands)
- Paviors
- Wellingborough

== 2015–16 ==
- Bedford Athletic
- Bugbooke
- Derby
- Huntingdon & District
- Ilkeston
- Kettering
- Market Rasen & Louth
- Matlock (promoted from Midlands 2 East (North))
- Newark
- Newbold-on-Avon (promoted from Midlands 2 West (South))
- Northampton Old Scouts (promoted from Midlands 2 East (North))
- Old Laurentians (promoted from Midlands 2 West (South))
- Paviors
- Wellingborough (promoted from Midlands 2 East (South))

== 2014–15 ==
- Bedford Athletic (relegated from National League 3 Midlands)
- Belgrave (promoted from Midlands 2 East (North))
- Bugbrooke
- Derby
- Huntingdon & District
- Ilkeston
- Kettering
- Mansfield
- Market Rasen & Louth
- Newark
- Old Northamptonians
- Paviors
- Spalding (promoted from Midlands 2 East (North))
- Syston (relegated from National League 3 Midlands)

== 2013–14 ==
- Bugbrooke (promoted from Midlands 2 East (South))
- Coalville (promoted from Midlands 2 East (North))
- Derby (relegated from National League 3 Midlands)
- Huntingdon & District (promoted from Midlands 2 East (South))
- Ilkeston
- Kettering
- Mansfield (relegated from National League 3 Midlands)
- Market Rasen & Lough
- Matlock
- Newark
- Old Northamptonians
- Paviors
- Peterborough
- Peterborough Lions

== 2012–13 ==
- Bedford Athletic
- Ilkeston
- Kettering
- Loughborough
- Market Bosworth (promoted from Midlands 2 East (North))
- Market Rasen and Louth
- Matlock
- Newark
- Paviors
- Peterborough
- Peterborough Lions
- Spalding
- Towcestrians

== 2011–12 ==
- Bedford Athletic
- Coalville
- Derby
- Ilkeston
- Kettering
- Leighton Buzzard
- Loughborough
- Market Rasen and Louth
- Matlock
- Nuneaton OE
- Paviors
- Peterborough
- Spalding
- Towcestrians (promoted from Midlands 2 East (South))

== 2010–11 ==
- Bedford Athletic
- Coalville
- Derby
- Dunstablians
- Ilkeston
- Kettering
- Leighton Buzzard
- Mansfield
- Matlock
- Newark
- Paviors
- Spalding
- Syston
- Wellingborough

== 2009–10 ==
- Derby
- Dunstablians
- Ilkeston
- Leighton Buzzard
- Mansfield
- Market Bosworth
- Matlock
- Newark
- Old Northamptonians
- Paviors
- Scunthorpe
- Stewarts & Lloyd
- Syston
- Wellingborough

== 2008–09 ==
Ampthill promoted as champions to newly formed National Division 3 Midlands.

- Ampthill
- Derby
- Dunstablians
- Leighton Buzzard
- Mansfield
- Market Bosworth
- Matlock
- Newark
- Paviors
- Scunthorpe
- Syston
- Wellingborough

== Original teams ==
When league rugby began in 1987 this division (known as Midlands 2 East) contained the following teams:

- Kettering
- Leighton Buzzard
- Lincoln
- Loughborough
- Matlock
- Newark
- Stamford
- Stoneygate
- Syston
- Vipers
- Wigston (Note: Wigston RFC would later merge with Westleigh RFC in 1998 to form Leicester Lions RFC.)

== Midland 1 East honours ==
=== Midlands 2 East (1987–1992) ===
The original Midlands 2 East (along with its counterpart Midlands 2 West) was a tier 6 league with promotion up to Midlands Premier and relegation down to either East Midlands/Leicestershire or Notts, Lincs & Derbyshire 1.

Midlands 2 East
Season	No of teams	Champions	Runners–up	Relegated teams	Reference
1987–88	11	Newark	Vipers	Wigston, Loughborough	
1988–89	11	Leighton Buzzard	Syston	Hinckley	
1989–90	11	Towcestrians	Vipers	Stoneygate	
1990–91	11	Syston	Vipers	Lincoln, Kettering, Chesterfield Panthers	
1991–92	11	Vipers	Paviors	Stewarts & Lloyds, Scunthorpe, Amber Valley	
Green backgrounds are the promotion places.

=== Midlands 2 (1992–1993) ===
Restructuring of the Midlands leagues ahead of the 1992–93 season saw Midlands 2 East and Midlands 2 West combined in a single tier 6 division known as Midlands 2. Promotion continued to Midlands 1 while relegation as now was now to the newly introduced Midlands East 1 (Note: Not to be confused with Midlands 1 East, Midlands East 1 is currently split into two regional leagues - Midlands 2 East (North) and Midlands 2 East (South).).

Midlands 2
Season	No of teams	Champions	Runners–up	Relegated teams	Reference
1992–93	12	Burton	Worcester	Biggleswade, Nottingham Moderns	
Green backgrounds are the promotion places.

=== Midlands 2 (1993–1996) ===
The top six teams from Midlands 1 and the top six from North 1 were combined to create National 5 North, meaning that Midlands 2 dropped to become a tier 7 league. Promotion and relegation continued to Midlands Premier and Midlands East 1 (Note: Midlands East 1 is currently split into two regional leagues - Midlands 2 East (North) and Midlands 2 East (South).).

Midlands 2
Season	No of teams	Champions	Runners–up	Relegated teams	Reference
1993–94	13	Whitchurch	Stafford	Vipers	
1994–95	13	Leighton Buzzard	Broadstreet	Willenhall, Newark, Peterborough	
1995–96	13	Scunthorpe	Hinckley (Note: Due to widespread restructuring, 3rd and 4th place Derby and Stockwood Park were also promoted.)	No relegation (Note: Nationwide league restructuring meant that there was no relegation this season.)	
Green backgrounds are the promotion places.

=== Midlands 2 (1996–2000) ===
At the end of the 1995–96 season National 5 North was discontinued and Midlands 2 returned to being a tier 6 league. Promotion and relegation continued to Midlands Premier and Midlands East 1 (Note: Midlands East 1 is currently split into two regional leagues - Midlands 2 East (North) and Midlands 2 East (South).).

Midlands 2
Season	No of teams	Champions	Runners–up	Relegated teams	Reference
1996–97	17	Banbury	Kenilworth	Bedworth, Matlock, Long Buckby, Keresley	
1997–98	17	Bedford Athletic	Dudley Kingswinford	Paviors	
1998–99	17	Longton	Newbold-on-Avon	Leamington, Towcestrians, Stafford	
1999–00	17	Malvern (Note: Due to the restructuring of Midlands 2 into two regional divisions champions Malvern were not promoted, instead being transferred to the new Midlands 2 West division.)	Bromsgrove (Note: Midlands 2 was due to be restructured into two regional divisions for the following season. Malvern, Bromsgrove, Luctonians, Old Laurentians, Newport (Salop), Sutton Coldfield, Derby and Wolverhampton would transfer into Midlands 2 West, while Wellingborough, Kettering, Ampthill, Mansfield, Huntingdon & District, Lincoln, Nottingham Moderns, Leighton Buzzard and Stockwood Park would go into Midlands 2 East.)	No relegation (Note: Due to the restructuring of Midlands 2 into two regional divisions there was no relegation.)	
Green backgrounds are the promotion places.

=== Midlands 2 East (2000–2009) ===
Restructuring ahead of the 2000–01 season saw Midlands 2 split back into two tier 6 regional leagues - Midlands 2 East and Midlands 2 West. Promotion continued to Midlands 1 while relegation was now to either Midlands 3 East (North) or Midlands 3 East (South) (both formerly part of Midlands East 1).

Midlands 2 East
Season	No of teams	Champions	Runners–up	Relegated teams	Reference
2000–01	12	Dunstablians	Wellingborough	Stockwood Park, Leighton Buzzard, Nottingham Moderns	
2001–02	12	Hinckley	Spalding	Lincoln, Huntingdon & District	
2002–03	12	Kettering	Luton	Ilkeston, Wellingborough	
2003–04	12	Mansfield	Hinckley	Nottingham Moderns, Banbury, Northampton Old Scouts	
2004–05	12	Luton	Market Bosworth	Huntingdon & District, Syston, Melton Mowbray	
2005–06	12	South Leicester	Peterborough	Ampthill, Spalding, Towcestrians	
2006–07	12	Loughborough Students	Matlock	Mansfield, Northampton Old Scouts, Ilkeston	
2007–08	12	Kettering	Hinckley	Melton Mowbray, Banbury, Old Northamptonians	
2008–09	12	Ampthill	Scunthorpe	No relegation due to league restructure (Note: The division would be renamed Midlands Division 1 East for the next season and along with the whole national restructure of the league system by the RFU lead to mass changes at all levels.)	
Green background are the promotion places.

=== Midlands 1 East (2009–2022) ===
League restructuring by the RFU meant that Midlands 2 East and Midlands 2 West were renamed as Midlands 1 East and Midlands 1 West, with both leagues remaining at tier 6. Promotion was now to National League 3 Midlands (Note: National League 3 Midlands is currently known as Midlands Premier.) (formerly Midlands 1) and relegation to either Midlands 2 East (North) or Midlands 2 East (South) (Note: Prior to the 2009–10 season Midlands 2 East (North) or Midlands 2 East (South) were both known as Midlands 3 East (North) and Midlands 3 East (South).).

Midlands 1 East
Season	No of teams	Champions	Runners–up	Relegated teams	Reference
2009–10	14	Scunthorpe	Old Northamptonians	Market Bosworth, Stewarts & Lloyds	
2010–11	14	Syston	Mansfield	Dunstablians, Wellingborough	
2011–12	14	Derby	Paviors	Coalville, Nuneaton Old Edwardians, Leighton Buzzard	
2012–13	14	Bedford Athletic	Ilkeston	Loughborough, Spalding, Market Bosworth	
2013–14	14	Peterborough Lions	Derby	Coalville, Peterborough, Matlock	
2014–15	14	Syston	Old Northamptonians	Spalding, Belgrave, Mansfield	
2015–16	14	Bedford Athletic	Derby	Matlock, Old Laurentians, Newark	
2016–17	14	Newbold-on-Avon	Kettering	Ilkeston, Dronfield (Note: Due to London Welsh being expelled from the RFU Championship in January 2017 only 23 teams would be relegated from the 8 divisions that make up tier 6 of the English rugby union league system instead of the usual 24 - meaning that the 12th placed side in one of the leagues would be safe. In the end 12th placed Wellingborough from Midlands 1 East gained more points (56) than any other 12th placed team across tier 6 leaving them safe from relegation and ensuring only 2 teams went down from Midlands 1 East that season.)	
2017–18	14	Bedford Athletic	Syston	Market Rasen & Louth, Huntingdon & District, Bugbrooke	
2018–19	14	Kettering	Paviors	Melton Mowbray, Northampton Old Scouts, Leighton Buzzard	
2019–20	14	Syston	Oundle	Wellingborough, Olney, Melbourne	
2020–21	14	Cancelled due to the COVID-19 pandemic in the United Kingdom.			
Green background are the promotion places.

=== Regional 2 Midlands East (2022–2025) ===
Regional 2 Midlands East
Season	No of teams	Champions	Runners–up	Relegated teams	Reference
2022–23	12	Old Northamptonians	Lutterworth	Old Laurentians and Peterborough Lions RFC	
2023–24	12	Nuneaton	Lutterworth	Newbold-on-Avon and Towcestrians	
2024–25	12	Lutterworth	Northampton Old Scouts	Market Bosworth and Leicester Forest	

=== Regional 2 Midlands East (2025– ) ===
Regional 2 Midlands East continued to be a tier 6 league. Promotion and relegation play-offs were introduced.

Regional 2 Midlands East
Season	No of teams	No of matches	Champions	2nd	3rd	Relegated teams	Ref
2025–26	12	22	Northampton Old Scouts	Market Harborough	Broadstreet	Daventry (11th) and Wellingborough (12th)	
Green background are the promotion places.

== Number of league titles ==
- Bedford Athletic (4) (Note: One of Bedford Athletic's titles was when league was single division known as Midlands 2.)
- Syston (4)
- Kettering (3)
- Leighton Buzzard (2) (Note: One of Leighton Buzzard's titles was when league was single division known as Midlands 2.)
- Scunthorpe (2) (Note: One of Scunthorpe's titles was when league was single division known as Midlands 2.)
- Ampthill (1)
- Banbury (1) (Note: Banbury's title was when league was single division known as Midlands 2.)
- Burton (1) (Note: Burton's title was when league was single division known as Midlands 2.)
- Derby (1)
- Dunstablians (1)
- Hinckley (1)
- Longton (1) (Note: Longton's title was when league was single division known as Midlands 2.)
- Loughborough Students (1)
- Luton (1)
- Lutterworth (1)
- Malvern (1) (Note: Malvern's title was when league was single division known as Midlands 2.)
- Mansfield (1)
- Newbold-on-Avon (1)
- Newark (1)
- Nuneaton (1)
- Old Northamptonians (1)
- Northampton Old Scouts (1)
- Peterborough Lions (1)
- South Leicester (1)
- Towcestrians (1)
- Vipers (1)
- Whitchurch (1) (Note: Whitchurch's title was when league was single division known as Midlands 2.)

== Promotion play-offs ==
Since the 2000–01 season there has been a play-off between the runners-up of Midlands 1 East and Midlands 1 West for the third and final promotion place to National League 3 Midlands. The team with the superior league record has home advantage in the tie. At the end of the 2019–20 season the Midlands 1 East teams have been the most successful with eleven wins to the Midlands 1 West teams eight; and the home team has won promotion on thirteen occasions compared to the away teams six.

Midlands 1 East v Midlands 1 West promotion play-off results
Season	Home team	Score	Away team	Venue	Attendance
2000–01	Luctonians (W)	20–13	Wellingborough (E)	Mortimer Park, Kingsland, Herefordshire	
2001–02	Old Laurentians (W)	10–32	Spalding (E)	Fenley Field, Rugby, Warwickshire	
2002–03	Luton (E)	16–11	Derby (W)	Newlands Road, Luton, Bedfordshire	
2003–04	Derby (W)	29–12	Hinckley (E)	Haslams Lane, Derby, Derbyshire	
2004–05	Market Bosworth (E)	40–7	Malvern (W)	Cadeby Lane, Market Bosworth, Warwickshire	
2005–06	Peterborough (E)	23–21	Kenilworth (W)	Fortress Fengate, Peterborough, Cambridgeshire	1,000
2006–07	Newport (Salop) (W)	20–5	Matlock (E)	The Old Showground, Newport, Shropshire	500
2007–08	Hereford (W)	13–43	Hinckley (E)	Wyeside, Hereford, Herefordshire	
2008–09	Scunthorpe (E)	9–16	Hereford (W)	Heslam Park, Scunthorpe, Lincolnshire	
2009–10	Bournville (W)	AWO (Note: Old Northamptonians were promoted by default as Bournville were unable to field a front row for the 2009–10 play-off game.)	Old Northamptonians (E)	Rowheath, Bournville, Birmingham, West Midlands	N/A
2010–11	Sutton Coldfield (W)	27–33	Mansfield (E)	Roger Smoldon Ground, Sutton Coldfield, West Midlands	
2011–12	Bournville (W)	42–11	Paviors (E)	Bournbrook, Edgbaston, Birmingham, West Midlands	
2012–13	Worcester Wanderers (W)	27–17 (aet)	Ilkeston (E)	Weston's Field, Worcester, Worcestershire	
2013–14	Burton (W)	24–20	Derby (E)	Peel Croft, Burton, Staffordshire	1,000
2014–15	Old Northamptonians (E)	20–5	Worcester Wanderers (W)	Sir Humphrey Cripps Pavilion, Northampton, Northamptonshire	
2015–16	Derby (E)	28–23	Bournville (W)	Haslams Lane, Derby, Derbyshire	200
2016–17	Kettering (E)	19–55	Bournville (W)	Waverley Road, Kettering, Northamptonshire	
2017–18	Syston (E)	37–33	Dudley Kingswinford (W)	Barkby Road, Queniborough, Leicestershire	
2018–19	Paviors (E)	33–30	Dudley Kingswinford (W)	The Ron Rossin Ground, Nottingham, Nottinghamshire	
2019–20	Cancelled due to COVID-19 pandemic in the United Kingdom. Best ranked runner-up – Oundle (E) – promoted instead.				
Green background is the promoted team. E = Midlands 1 East (formerly Midlands 2 East) and W = Midlands 1 West (formerly Midlands 2 West)

== See also ==
- Midlands RFU
- East Midlands RFU
- Leicestershire RU
- Notts, Lincs & Derbyshire RFU
- English rugby union system
- Rugby union in England
