= Olney RFC =

English rugby union club, based in Buckinghamshire

Olney
- Full name: Olney Rugby Football Club
- Union: Buckinghamshire RFU / East Midlands RFU
- Founded: 1877; 149 years ago
- Location: Olney, Buckinghamshire, England
- Ground: East Street
- President: Tom Salsbury
- Captain: Ewan Fuller
- League: Regional 2 East Midlands
- 2025–26: 9th

Official website
- www.olneyrfc.co.uk

Olney Rugby Football Club is an amateur club playing Rugby Football Union. The club was formed in 1877 in the market town of Olney, near Milton Keynes, Buckinghamshire.

The club currently fields teams in seniors, ladies, girls and mini & junior categories as well as running Touch Rugby sessions. The club also organises and runs the annual Olney 7s Tournament – one of the premier Sevens tournaments in the area, which is part of the England Rugby 7s series

In 2019 the club was awarded The Queens Award for Voluntary Service.

== History and past players ==
Olney Rugby Club has over 145 years of history. The first recorded game in Olney, in 1877, was played on Cherry Orchard, a meadow on the banks of the Ouse which is now the Cemetery, and there, where they first took to the field to play, many of the old players lay for their last long "no side"

During First World War sixteen playing members lost their lives.

Edgar Mobbs was an Olney boy, born in Dartmouth House in the High Street. He played rugby, cricket and hockey for Olney. In an interview published in the 'Boys Own' magazine in 1913 it confirms that he played rugby for Olney for one or two seasons around 1903. He later played for Northampton, England and the Barbarians.

Blair Swannell had the unique distinction of being capped for England and Australia. He was a member of the British Touring team to Australia in 1899, which won eighteen of twenty-one games, and the tour of New Zealand in 1904 where all fourteen games were won. He decided to remain in Australia and played for New South Wales in 1905/6 being capped for Australia in that year.

Alexander Bell (A P Bell), who went on to captain the Northampton Saints rugby union team from 1943 to 1946, and also played first class county cricket for Northamptonshire, played as a centre at Olney for several years. He scored a prolific 30 tries in the 1934–35 season and later came back to captain the club in its 75th season.

Olney's junior section was established in 1973 they won the National Rugby Award for Youth and Mini section of the year in 2016. Many of the young members have transitioned to the senior club or continue to play rugby elsewhere.

In 1995 a Ladies section was established which, at its height, won the National Cup and competed at one league below Premiership level.

More recent alumni include Will Greenwood (Olney Vets & England), Duncan Taylor (Olney M&J and Colts, Saracens and Scotland), Tom Hardwick (Olney M&J, Leicester Tigers, Albi and England), Lucy Attwood (Olney Girls, Bristol Bears Women and England), Lizzie Adams (Olney Girls, Loughborough Lighting and Englands 7s) Georgia Brock (Olney Girls, Gloucester-Hartbury and England)

== Honours ==
=== Senior rugby ===
- Bucks/Oxon 1 champions: 1990–91
- Southern Counties North champions (2): 1998–99, 2007–08
- Midlands 2 East (South) champions: 2018–19
- Northampton & District Rugby Alliance Lewis Shield winners: 2023,24, 2013–14, 2006–07, 1995–96, 1988–89, 1976–77
- Northampton & District Rugby Alliance Paget Cup winners: 2018–19, 1998–99

=== Ladies ===
- Women's NC 2 Midlands (Central) league champions: 2022–21

=== Colts ===
- National U18s Cup: Winners 2024–25 and 2025-26, Finalists 2022–23
- Northampton & District Rugby Alliance Oceanic Cup winners: 2023–24, 1909–10
