= Mike Berridge (rugby union) =

English rugby union player

- Full name: Michael John Berridge
- Born: 28 February 1923 Huntingdon, Cambridgeshire, England
- Died: 2 October 1973 (aged 50) Oundle, Northamptonshire, England

Rugby union career
- Position: Prop
International career
Years	Team	Apps	(Points)
1949	England	2	(0)

Michael John Berridge (28 February 1923 – 2 October 1973) was an English rugby union international.

Born in Huntingdon, Cambridgeshire, Berridge was a twin son of decorated World War I colonel Frederick Berridge and attended The King's School in Peterborough. He captained the school's first XV in 1939/40.

Berridge, a Peterborough Town product, spent most of his career at Northampton, playing over 250 games. He was an East Midlands county representative and gained two England caps in the 1949 Five Nations Championship, against Wales at Cardiff Arms Park and Ireland at Lansdowne Road, both as a prop.

== See also ==
- List of England national rugby union players
