= Kettering RFC =

English rugby union club, based in Northamptonshire

- Full name: Kettering Rugby Football Club
- Union: East Midlands RFU
- Nickname: The Blues
- Founded: 1875; 151 years ago
- Location: Kettering, Northamptonshire, England
- Ground: Waverley Road (Capacity: 2,000)
- Chairman: (England) Steve Wilson
- President: (England) Helen Bridgeman (first ever Lady President at Kettering RFC)
- Coaches: (Wales) Dickie Heath; (England) Brett Sturgess; (England) Graham Wilson; (England) Danny Noble
- Captain: (England) Josh Cox
- League: Regional 2 Midlands East
- 2025–26: 7th

Official website
- www.ketteringrugbyclub.com

Kettering Rugby Football Club (KRFC) is a rugby union club located in Waverley Road on the south side of Kettering, England. The 1st XV currently compete in Regional 2 East Midlands – a level 6 league in the English rugby union system – following their promotion as champions of Midlands 1 East at the end of the 2018–19 season.

== History ==
The earliest available records indicate that the playing of rugby football in Kettering was initiated by the Rector of Barton Seagrave village in 1871. After a period of playing under Uppingham Public School Rules the club formally adopted RFU rules in 1875, quickly becoming a significant participant in both local community and the fast developing rugby scene in the East Midlands.

In the early days games were played on a number of sites including farmers' fields and council owned grounds. It was during this period, prior to adopting a home of its own, that the club developed its high profile in the town. Social occasions and players' "meetings" were held traditionally at the Royal Hotel, later moving to the George, with more formal occasions such as the Annual Ball becoming the highlight of the local function calendar. The club moved to its current Waverley Road home in 1963 where it boasts three pitches, additional training areas and a fully licensed club house.

The club celebrated its 150th anniversary in 2025 with a family fun day and fundraiser.

== KRFC today ==
The club regularly fields three senior sides plus colts and an occasional Classics XV on a Saturday or midweek under the clubs' new match floodlights and has a thriving Mini/Junior and Girls sections with teams at every age group from under 6 to under 16 in the Mini/Juniors and 14's, 16'ws and 18's girls sides with the club looking to run a Ladies XV asap.

The mini and junior section has produced three recent Premiership players in James Cannon (Wasps)(Connacht)(Ealing Trailfinders), Brett Sturgess (Exeter Chiefs) and Will Chudley (Exeter Chiefs) (Bath Rugby)as well as a number of players playing professional and semi-professional rugby at Championship and National 1 level

== Honours ==
- Midlands East 2 champions: 1992–93
- Midlands East 1 (Note: Not to be confused with Midlands 1 East.) champions: 1995–96
- Midlands 1 East champions (3): 2002–03, 2007–08, 2018–19
- East Midlands Cup Winners 2014–15

== Recent League results ==
2016–17 Midlands 1 East 2nd
2015–16 Midlands 1 East 4th
2014–15 Midlands 1 East 4th
2013–14 Midlands 1 East 6th
2012–13 Midlands 1 East 9th
2011–12 Midlands 1 East 4th
2010–11 Midlands 1 East 8th
2009–10 National League 3 Midlands 13th (relegated)
2008–09 Midlands 1 8th
2007–08 Midlands 2 East 1st (champions, promoted)

== Notable former players ==
- Nick Drake-Lee – England 1963–64
- (England) Les Berridge – Northampton Saints
- (England) Vince Cannon – Northampton Saints
- (England) David 'Lennie' Newman – Northampton Saints
- (Wales) Steve Waldron – Northampton Saints
- (England) Bob 'Chalky' White – Bedford and Leicester Tigers
- Mick Featherstone – England Schools
- Tom Spencer – England Schools
- Will Bowley - England National Under-18 Under-19 & Under-21 rugby union team, Worcester Warriors, Rosslyn Park
- Harry Owens - England National Under 18's Rugby Union Team, Barking
- (England) Bill Drake-Lee – Leicester Tigers
- (England) Paul Baird – Bedford Blues
- (England) Tom Poole – Coventry
- (England) Brett Sturgess – Exeter Chiefs
- Will Chudley – Exeter Chiefs and England 2015
- James Cannon – Northampton Saints, Wasps, Connacht and England U20
- (Wales) Doug Bridgeman – Rugby Lions and Northampton Saints
- Kieran Hallett – Cornish Pirates and Ireland U21
