= Newbold-on-Avon RFC =

English rugby union club, based in Rugby, England

(England) Newbold-on-Avon RFC
- Full name: Newbold-on-Avon Rugby Football Club
- Union: Warwickshire RFU
- Nickname: The Bold
- Founded: 1894; 132 years ago
- Location: Rugby, England
- Ground: Parkfield Road
- Coach: Carl Roderick
- League: Counties 1 Midlands East (South)
- 2024–25: 5th

Newbold-on-Avon Rugby Club is an English rugby union club based in Newbold-on-Avon, a suburb of Rugby in Warwickshire. The club runs three senior teams with the first XV team currently playing in Counties 1 Midlands East (South). The club also run a veterans side and junior teams.

== Honours ==
- Midland Counties Cup winners: 1925–26
- Midlands West 1 (Note: Not to be confused with Midlands West 1.) champions: 1997–98
- Midlands 2 West (South) champions: 2014–15
- Midlands 1 East champions: 2016–17
