= Market Bosworth RFC =

- Full name: Market Bosworth Rugby Football Club
- Union: Leicestershire RU
- Founded: 1965; 60 years ago
- Location: Market Bosworth, Leicestershire, England
- Ground(s): Fortress Cadeby Lane
- Chairman: Rob McWhirter
- President: (England) John Ward
- Coach(es): Rob Harding
- Captain(s): Harry Milner
- League(s): Counties 1 Midlands East (South)
- 2023–24: 2nd (promoted to Regional 2 Midlands East)
1st kit	2nd kit

Official website
- www.mbrfc.co.uk

Market Bosworth RFC is an English rugby union club based in Market Bosworth, Leicestershire. Bosworth currently compete in Regional 2 Midlands East. The club play their home games at Cadeby Lane and their colours are blue and yellow. During the 2011 season, Market Bosworth's under-17's were National Champions as well as County Champions. Former England and British and Irish Lions player, Ollie Smith played for Market Bosworth from the age of 14. Market Bosworth's local rivals are Hinckley RFC.

== President ==
John Ward has taken the role of Club President next season, replacing fellow president Harry Whitehead who has stepped down and it's fitting to note his long and distinguished contribution to the club. Harry grew up in North Wales but did not start playing rugby until he left school. His first two games were on the wing but he wasted little time in moving up to hooker where he played ever since. John Ward is a Bosworth club man through and through. He has been a Vice-President for a number of years and coached a Bosworth side at under-14's through to under-16's quite a number of this successful team are still playing or associated with the club.

== Ground ==
Market Bosworth RFC is situated in open countryside, it is located on Cadeby Lane just outside the historic market town of Market Bosworth. The rugby club offers a good sized function room and fully licensed bar, plus a vast outside area for functions.

=== Coaches ===
- Rob Harding, Director of Rugby
  - Tony Ballance, Backs Coach
  - Jonathan Chadburn, Backs Coach
  - Ian Saunders, Forwards Coach

== Under 17's National Champions ==
Market Bosworth Under 17's travelled to Stourbridge on Sunday 1 May to take on West Country team Hucclecote in the National Finals of the Under 17's cup. Having beaten a very good Otley side in a hard fought semi-final at Doncaster the reward was a trip to Stourton home of Stourbridge R.F.C. to play Hucclecote. The team were praised by their head coach: "This was a fantastic performance by a group of players who have grown in stature, confidence and ability. "We knew this would be a tough game – and that's exactly what it proved to be. Hucclecote hadn't lost a game for two years. To stand any chance of winning, we had to be at the top of our game in all departments. But even I didn't expect the lads to cope so well with playing on the big stage."

== Honours ==
- East Midlands/Leicestershire 1 champions: 1998–99
- Midlands East 2 champions: 1999–00
- Midlands 3 East (North) champions: 2001–02
- Leicestershire County Cup winners: 2004–05
- Midlands 2 (east v west) promotion play-off winners: 2004–05

== Sources ==
- The article has largely been taken from the official Market Bosworth RFC website (link below)
- The images have all been taken from the Market Bosworth RFC Website (link below)
