= Mansfield Rugby Club =

Rugby union club in Nottinghamshire, England

(England) Mansfield
- Full name: Mansfield Rugby Union Football Club
- Union: Notts, Lincs & Derbyshire RFU
- Founded: 1956; 70 years ago
- Location: Mansfield, Nottinghamshire, England
- Region: Midlands
- Ground: Eakring Road (Capacity: 1,000)
- Chairman: Andy Foster
- President: Michael Copestake
- League: Counties 2 Midlands East (North)
- 2025-26: 1st

Official website
- www.pitchero.com/clubs/mansfieldrugby/

Mansfield Rugby Club is a Community Amateur Sports Club (CASC) affiliated to the English rugby union based in Mansfield, Nottinghamshire. The club runs three senior sides and a veterans team for men and one senior women's team, in addition to junior sides for boys and girls from U7 to U18. They also have a Touch Rugby Centre. The club has a 3G rubber crumb training pitch and indoor sports hall which has a wooden sprung linoleum floor capable of accommodating 5-a-side football, badminton, netball and basketball as well as concerts and festivals. The clubhouse is regularly used for parties and events as well as external functions including Mansfield Folk Festival and the Dukeries Rally Club. The first XV currently play in Counties 1 Midlands East (North), a seventh tier league in the English rugby union system.

== History ==
Mansfield Rugby Club was formed in 1956 and by 1977 the club had bought its own ground at Eakring Road. Building started on the clubhouse soon after and was completed in 1979. Singer and entertainer Max Boyce was guest of honour at the official opening. The club was placed in Midlands 1 when the league system was introduced in 1987. A reorganisation of the leagues resulted in the club moving to Midlands 2 East but Mansfield gained two promotions, moving into Midlands 1 followed by the club reaching its highest league position in 2011 to National League 3. As an amateur club they were unable to sustain that level of competition after losing several players to professional rugby and recent seasons saw three relegations. However, most recently in 2023 they have been promoted.

== Honours ==
- Midlands Division 2 East champions: 2003–04
- Midlands 3 East (North) champions: 2007–08
- Midlands 1 (east v west) promotion play-off winners: 2010-11
