= Loughborough RFC =

Rugby union club in Leicestershire, England

(England) Loughborough
- Full name: Loughborough Rugby Football Club
- Union: Leicestershire RU
- Founded: 1929; 97 years ago
- Location: Loughborough, Leicestershire, England
- Ground: Derby Road Playing Fields
- Chairman: David Bonser
- President: Martin Conlon
- Captain: Gareth Love
- League: Midlands 3 East (North)
- 2025-26: 5th
Team kit

Official website
- www.lrfc.org.uk

Loughborough Rugby Football Club is a rugby union club in Loughborough, United Kingdom that has been in existence since 1929. The club has over 500 players and supported by volunteers.

In 1929 a handful of players, met and decided to form the club. Loughborough RFC is affiliated to the Leicestershire Rugby Union (LRU), the Rugby Football Union and the Rugby Football Union for Women. The club now plays its matches on Derby Road Playing Fields.

The 1st XV played league fixtures in Midlands 1 East for the first time in the 2011–12 Season.

The club has reached the final of the Leicestershire County Bowl, beating Vipers RFC two years in succession to lift the trophy. (Oddly enough, the 'Bowl' is actually a cup. This should not be seen as being too odd though as when Loughborough won the Leicestershire County Plate, the plate was in fact a shield.) This season Loughborough's attempt to lift the trophy for a third successive year was thwarted by Leicester Forest, a close and hard-fought game ending with a 12-10 victory for the Leicester outfit.

== Women's and youth teams ==
The club's women team uses plays its matches at Derby Road. Through partnership with Loughborough Lightning, there is a player pathway to the Premiership Women's Rugby and provide more opportunities for players, including Loughborough University students.

The team currently play in the Championship North since their Midlands win in 2013/14 season.

2012–13 season saw the Loughborough 1st XV win the Midlands One league title from Olney in a 'winner takes all' finale match at Derby Road, and from there progressed to a Northern play-off against Altrincham Kersal. Loughborough played their opponents off the park in a 29–7 win, and secured promotion to level 2 of the women's game, Championship North 1. This promotion was the first time Loughborough had achieved a League title since they won four consecutive League Championships from 2001-2004. The Women's XV have also previously reached the final of the RFUW North Cup and the RFUW National Shield, RFUW Super 4 competition and regularly see players in the Leicestershire County representative senior team.

Loughborough's youth set-up ranges from 7-19 years old.

== Veterans team ==
In 2015, a team of former players was established by ex-First Team Captain Andrew York.

== Honours ==
- Midlands 2 East (north v south) promotion play-off winners: 2010–11
