= Peterborough RUFC =

English rugby union club, based in Peterborough

Peterborough
- Full name: Peterborough Rugby Union Football Club
- Union: East Midlands RFU
- Location: Peterborough, Cambridgeshire
- Ground: Fengate
- Chairman: Tina Prewer
- League: Regional 2 East Midlands
- 2025–26: 5th

Official website
- peterboroughrufc.rfu.club

Peterborough Rugby Club is an English rugby union team based in the city of Peterborough. The club runs two senior men's sides, an under-18 team, a senior ladies' team and under-18 girls' team, and a full set of junior teams including under-16, 14 and 12 girls teams. The first XV currently plays in Regional 2 East Midlands – a level six league in the English rugby union system.

Three men who started their rugby at the club – Ron Jacobs, Mike Berridge and Harry Wells – went on to play for England. Other former players include internationals who have been capped by Scotland, Lithuania, Germany and Zimbabwe.

Former club players include a chief constable, a ground-breaking scientist, the father-in-law of a soccer Premier League club's chairman, and a man who took over the running of Rudyard Kipling's country estate. A judge and a man who he sentenced, even played alongside each other in the same team.

Peterborough Rugby Club was founded in 1924, during a period of significant social and economic change in Britain. At the time, Peterborough was part of Northamptonshire and had a population of approximately 35,500. The club initially played at the Eastfield Road Showground, on the site later occupied by Peterborough Regional College. Before the WWII, the ground had no changing rooms or clubhouse facilities and players typically returned to a nearby hotel after matches to bathe and dine.

Peterborough Rugby Club was launched on 25 February 1924, when city councillor Archie Farrow hosted a meeting, which approved a set of rules for a new club and elected a committee. Over the previous two years, young solicitor Arthur Mellows, who went on to become mayor of the city and have the school at Glinton named after him, had organised four matches to raise money for charity, two against King's School and two against Stamford.

One of them was played in the garden of a vicarage on Eastfield Road and the players were mainly made up of ‘high society’ young men from the area. Amongst them was Leo Price, a teacher at Uppingham school who was capped four times by England, and Graham Doggart, later to become chairman of the Football Association only to die suddenly at the age of 66, while chairing the FA AGM at its Lancaster Gate HQ in 1963.

Club rugby's popularity peaked in the 1970s when Peterborough Rugby Club fielded five, sometimes even six, senior teams every Saturday, but women and children still did not play rugby.

Everything changed with the introduction of professionalism and league rugby in the 1990s. Some would say for the better of the sport, others for worse. Worcester Warriors were once in the same league as Peterborough RUFC, on their way to the Premiership and, ultimately, collapse.

Peterborough Rugby Club have been East Midlands champions four times, firstly under the captaincy of Selwyn Goss in 1978 and then again in 1985, 1989 and 2010.

The club's former players include Ron Jacobs, who was capped 29 times by England and later president of the RFU. Mike Berridge and Harry Wells also went on to play for England. Jon Phillips and Malcolm Foulkes-Arnold played for Northampton Saints and Leicester Tigers respectively. Ray Williams went on to be Tournament Director of the Rugby World Cup in Wales in 1991.

Other players associated to the club include Mickey Grant who was capped four times by Scotland and played over 150 games for Harlequins’ first XV before he came to Peterborough. Tim Smith played for Midlands Counties West side in the early 1970s before he moved to Peterborough. Paul Simpson, capped three times by England, also appeared for the clubs veterans' team in the early 1990s.

A community rugby club is built by ordinary people, not by capped internationals. It runs on friendships, shared memories and the volunteers who give their time. They include the team manager, the first-aider and the retired member tending the pitch. They also include the fifth-team player who never mastered the catch but never missed a social. Most of all, it is about the young people who arrive reluctantly and find somewhere to belong.

The social side of Peterborough Rugby Club was once immense. In the late 1970s, there were ‘disco members’ who could attend the popular Friday evening disco nights, but not vote on club matters. There were more of them at that time than there are senior playing members today.

For years, there was a hugely popular ‘Christmas Revue’, invariably held in March, which allowed players to channel their inner thespian.

Club parties would end up in the communal bath, both with and without clothes on. The story of ‘Nick the Crocodile’ is part of club legend. The club's pickled egg eating record, it is believed to have stood, unchallenged, since 1976 – 20 eggs in 15 minutes 52 seconds.

Members of the club's ‘band of brothers’ not only shed blood, sweat and tears for the club, but also for king and country. More than a dozen died in the world wars. William Victor Hart inspired many tales of gallantry in Boy's Own magazine. After being awarded the Military Cross for ‘conspicuous gallantry’ at Dunkirk in 1940, he found himself isolated behind enemy lines in Tunisia two years later. By now promoted to the rank of major, he decided that he and his 30 men would make themselves as big a nuisance to the Germans as possible. They attacked supply wagons, halted a military convoy heading for the front by shooting at its tyres, sowed mines on the road in front of tanks and ambushed a lorry load of paratroopers, always disappearing before they could be captured. They lived on bread and eggs that they traded for their clothing with local Arabs, and then had to walk a hundred miles in desert heat to get back to safety.

The conclusion of the club's 100th season coincided with the publication of a book documenting its history. The club's founding ethos was articulated in its first few months by founder Arthur Mellows, who stated, "The best man will always be chosen, be he coal-heaver, doctor or farmer, labourer or the labourer's employer.

== Honours ==
- Midlands 3 East (north v south) promotion play-off winners: 2003–04
- Midlands 2 (east v west) promotion play-off winners: 2005–06
- Midlands 2 East (South) champions: 2016–17
