= Brett Sturgess =

English rugby union player

Brett Stugress
- Born: 16 November 1981 (age 44) Kettering, England
- Height: 1.88 m (6 ft 2 in)
- Weight: 113 kg (17 st 11 lb)

Rugby union career
- Position: Prop
- Current team: Exeter Chiefs
Amateur team(s)
Years	Team	Apps	(Points)
- Kettering Rugby Club
Senior career
Years	Team	Apps	(Points)
2003–2006	Northampton Saints	45	(10)
2006–2007	Connacht	16	(0)
2007–2016	Exeter Chiefs	160	(50)

Brett Sturgess was born 16 November 1981 in Kettering, England, Sturgess is a rugby union player for Exeter Chiefs in the Aviva Premiership whose position of choice is Prop. Sturgess has previously played for Irish side Connacht Rugby and English side Northampton Saints. Sturgess joined Exeter in 2007 from Connacht and has become a regular feature in the Exeter squad. Sturgess left the Chiefs at the end of the 2015–16 season.

== External References ==
- Exeter Chiefs profile
