= Scunthorpe RUFC =

English rugby union club based in Lincolnshire

(England) Scunthorpe
- Full name: Scunthorpe Rugby Football Club
- Union: Notts, Lincs & Derbyshire RFU
- Founded: 1929; 97 years ago
- Ground: Heslam Park (Capacity: 1,212 (212 seats))
- Chairman: Liam Waldron
- President: Mal Yates
- Coach: Tim Robinson
- League: National League 2 North
- National League 2 North: 13th (relegated to Regional 1 North East)
Team kit

Official website
- scunthorperugby.com

Scunthorpe Rugby Club is an English rugby union team based in Scunthorpe, Lincolnshire. The club runs six senior sides, a ladies team, a colts and under-18s team and a full set of junior teams. The club currently play in Regional 1 North East following their relegation from National League 2 North at the end of the 2025–26 season.

== History ==
Scunthorpe Rugby Club was formed in 1929 and played its first fixtures in a field owned by a local farmer, on the condition that the goal posts were moved after each game so that the animals could return to graze. From these humble beginnings the club progressed to a stage whereby it was able to move to its own ground, Heslam Park, in 1952.

== Ground ==
Since 1952 the club have been based at Heslam Park in the middle of Scunthorpe, which they share with Scunthorpe Town cricket club. Heslam Park is accessible by car via the A18 and is around a mile from Scunthorpe railway station if coming by train. Facilities at the ground include a sports and social club, on-site parking, and an adjoined cricket pitch and rugby pitch, the rugby section of which features a covered stand with seating. The ground capacity around the rugby pitch includes 212 seats in the covered stand, along with approximately 1000 standing, leading to a total of around 1,212.

== Honours ==
- Notts, Lincs & Derbyshire 1 champions: 1988–89
- Midlands East 1 (Note: Not to be confused with Midlands 1 East.) champions: 1994–95
- Midlands 1 East champions (2): 1995–96, (Note: 1995–96 title was won when division was known as Midlands 2.) 2009–10
- Midlands Premier champions (3): 2000–01, 2015–16, 2018–19
- Regional 1 North East champions; 2024–25

== Current standings ==
2025–26 National League 2 North table
Pos	Team	Pld	W	D	L	PF	PA	PD	TB	LB	Pts	Qualification
1	Sheffield (P)	26	24	0	2	1041	467	+574	24	1	121	Promotion place
2	Tynedale	26	21	0	5	941	509	+432	19	3	106	Promotion play-off
3	Macclesfield (R)	26	20	0	6	1037	725	+312	21	2	103	
4	Hull Ionians	26	17	1	8	801	592	+209	19	3	92	
5	Darlington Mowden Park	26	15	1	10	878	877	+1	20	2	84	
6	Fylde	26	13	3	10	796	664	+132	16	5	79	
7	Wharfedale	26	13	0	13	725	780	−55	15	6	73	
8	Sheffield Tigers	26	12	0	14	686	611	+75	15	8	71	
9	Preston Grasshoppers	26	10	1	15	776	817	−41	16	3	61	
10	Billingham	26	10	0	16	604	905	−301	16	3	59	
11	Otley	26	7	0	19	673	831	−158	12	8	48	
12	Rossendale (R)	26	7	0	19	633	965	−332	14	4	46	Relegation play-off
13	Scunthorpe (R)	26	5	0	21	622	1097	−475	12	7	39	Relegation place
14	Hull (R)	26	5	0	21	570	943	−373	11	5	36	Relegation place

Updated to match(es) played on 2 May 2026. Source: National League Rugby
Rules for classification: If teams are level at any stage, tiebreakers are applied in the following order:
1. Number of matches won
2. Number of matches drawn
3. Difference between points for and against
4. Total number of points for
5. Aggregate number of points scored in matches between tied teams
6. Number of matches won excluding the first match, then the second and so on until the tie is settled
