= Lutterworth RFC =

English rugby union club, based in Lutterworth

(England) Lutterworth
- Full name: Lutterworth Rugby Football Club
- Union: Leicestershire RFU
- Founded: 1872; 154 years ago
- Location: Lutterworth, Leicestershire
- Ground: Ashby Lane
- League: Regional 1 Midlands
- 2025–26: 9th

Lutterworth Rugby Football Club (KRFC) is a rugby union club located in Lutterworth, Leicestershire. England. The 1st XV currently competes in Regional 1 Midlands – a level 5 league in the English rugby union system – following their promotion as champions of Regional 2 East Midlands at the end of the 2024-25 season, having been runner-up in the previous two seasons. The club is home to more than twenty teams which, in addition to the 1st XV, includes a 2nd XV, 3rd XV, a colts XV, a women's XV and junior sides.

== Honours ==
- Regional 2 East Midlands champions: 2024–25
- Midlands East 2 champions: 1995–96
- Leicestershire 1 champions: 1988–89
- Leicestershire County Cup winners: 1904–05
