= Great Doddington =

Village in Northamptonshire, England

Coordinates: 52.2717°N 0.7191°W

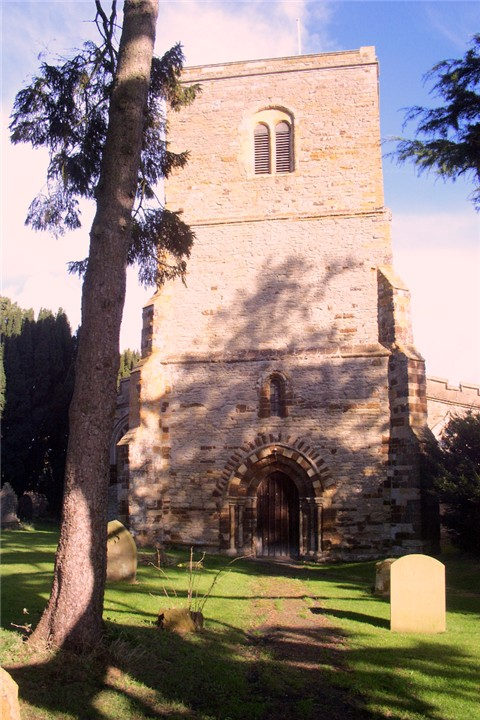
- Parish church

- Location within Northamptonshire
- Population: 1,123 (2011)
- OS grid reference: SP8764
- Unitary authority: North Northamptonshire
- Ceremonial county: Northamptonshire
- Region: East Midlands
- Country: England
- Sovereign state: United Kingdom
- Post town: Wellingborough
- Postcode district: NN29
- Dialling code: 01933
- Police: Northamptonshire
- Fire: Northamptonshire
- Ambulance: East Midlands
- UK Parliament: Wellingborough

Great Doddington is a village and civil parish in Northamptonshire, England, close to Wellingborough and just off the A45. At the time of the 2001 census, the parish's population was 1,061 increasing to 1,123 at the 2011 census.

The name Dodda's Tun probably refers to an Anglo-Saxon leader 'Dodda' establishing a stronghold in the strategic position overlooking the Nene Valley. Domesday Book records the principal landowner as Judith, widow of Waltheof II, Earl of Northumbria.

The Church of England St Nicholas Church dates back to Norman days and has a square tower and four 15th century misericords. The village contains a village shop, and two churches, St Nicholas' and a United Reformed Chapel.

The civil parish contains two wards.
