= 2017–18 National League 2 South =

Rugby union competition in England

- Countries: England
- Date: 2 September 2017 – 5 May 2018
- Champions: Cinderford (1st title)
- Runners-up: Chinnor (also promoted)
- Relegated: Broadstreet, Wimbledon, Barnstaple
- Matches played: 240
- Attendance: 86,522 (average 361 per match)
- Highest attendance: 1,016; Chinnor v Henley Hawks; 9 September 2017
- Lowest attendance: 89; Clifton v Bury St Edmunds; 17 March 2018
- Top point scorer: (Wales) Matthew McLean (Worthing Raiders); 295 points
- Top try scorer: (England) George Owen (London Irish WG); 27 tries

The 2017–18 National League 2 South is the ninth season (31st overall) of the fourth tier (south) of the English domestic rugby union competitions since the professionalised format of the second division was introduced.

On 7 April 2018 Broadstreet became the first club to be relegated, a 12–16 defeat away to fellow strugglers Barnstaple condemning them to the drop with three games to go. On 21 April Cinderford became champions with a game to go following a narrow 21–19 win away to Bury St Edmunds. Cinderford were easily the best team in the division, finishing 12 points clear of second place Chinnor, who on most other seasons would have been good enough to finish champions but instead had to settle for the promotion playoff game. In winning the league title Cinderford set several National League 2 South records including winning the most games (29) and gaining the most points (143).

The battle for the final two relegation spots was one of the most keenest in several years with three teams threatened by the drop on the last day of the season. In the end it was Wimbledon and Barnstaple who went down on the 28 April, despite Barum getting a 17–14 win at home against the Londoners, as Old Redcliffians managed to win at home to Redruth. Old Reds had looked dead certs for relegation earlier in the season but turned it around with eight wins in the second half (compared to just 2 before Christmas) of the season to stay safe by 3 points, even leapfrogging 13th placed London Irish Wild Geese who had secured safety the week before. Wimbledon also did well in the second half of the season getting eight wins (compared to one in the first half) but were ultimately left with two much to do and were 7 points from safety after their defeat at Pottingham Road. Barnstaple, by contrast, had looked safe earlier in the season but endured a torrid second half with just four wins after Christmas (for a total of ten overall). Injuries, along with poor try scoring and improvements from the teams around them, were primary contributors to Barum's downfall.

On 5 May 2018 Chinnor would join Cinderford in the 2018–19 National League 1 after they defeated 2017–18 National League 2 North runners up Sedgley Park 40–31 in the promotion play-off game played at Kingsey Road.

== Structure ==
The league consists of sixteen teams with all the teams playing each other on a home and away basis to make a total of thirty matches each. There is one automatic promotion place, one play-off place and three relegation places. The champions are promoted to the 2018–19 National League 1 and the runners-up play the second-placed team in the 2017–18 National League 2 North with the winner being promoted. The last three teams are relegated to either London & South East Premier or South West Premier depending on the geographical location of the team (in some cases teams may join the Midlands regional leagues).

The results of the matches contribute points to the league as follows:

- 4 points are awarded for a win
- 2 points are awarded for a draw
- 0 points are awarded for a loss, however
- 1 losing (bonus) point is awarded to a team that loses a match by 7 points or fewer
- 1 additional (bonus) point is awarded to a team scoring 4 tries or more in a match.

== Participating teams and locations ==
Locations of the 2017–18 National League 2 South teams

Twelve of the teams listed below participated in the 2016–17 National League 2 South season. The 2016–17 champions Bishop's Stortford and play-off winners Old Elthamians, who won the promotion play-off against Sale FC, were promoted into the 2017–18 National League 1, while no sides located in the south were relegated. The two relegated sides from National League 2 South are Exmouth (who drop to South West Premier) and Barnes (who drop to London & South East Premier). Usually three sides are relegated but when RFU Championship side London Welsh went into liquidation in the spring of 2017 it granted a reprieve for the 14th placed side in either National League 2 North or National League 2 South depending on comparable points, which in the end turned out to be Barnstaple.

The promoted teams are Old Redcliffians who finished as champions of National League 3 South West (now South West Premier), while Tonbridge Juddians (champions) and Wimbledon (playoffs) came up from National League 3 London & SE (now London & South East Premier). Broadstreet were also included in the division when they were level transferred from National League 2 North having been promoted as champions of National League 3 Midlands (now Midlands Premier). Broadstreet's inclusion came due to an imbalance of teams as both Bishop's Stortford and Old Elthamians had gone up into National League 1 coupled with no teams coming down the opposite way, and as the most southerly club, Broadstreet were deemed the most suitable for a level transfer.

Team	Stadium	Capacity	City/Area	Previous season
Barnstaple	Pottington Road	2,000 (575 seats)	Barnstaple, Devon	14th (Note: Usually a 14th place finish would have meant relegation for Barnstaple most seasons. However, due to London Welsh going into liquidation in the latter half of the 2016-17, one team from level 4 were given a reprieve, meaning that Barnstaple were kept safe due to having the better record than the similarly placed team in the 2016–17 National League 2 North.)
Broadstreet	Ivor Preece Field	1,500 (250 seats)	Binley Woods, Coventry, West Midlands	Promoted from National 3 Midlands (champions) (Note: Broadstreet were level transferred into National League 2 South from National League 2 North due to an imbalance of teams.)
Bury St Edmunds	The Haberden	3,000 (135 seats)	Bury St Edmunds, Suffolk	11th
Canterbury	The Marine Travel Ground	1,500 (75 seats)	Canterbury, Kent	8th
Chinnor	Kingsey Road	2,000	Thame, Oxfordshire	3rd
Cinderford	Dockham Road	2,500	Cinderford, Gloucestershire	7th
Clifton	Station Road	2,200 (200 seats)	Cribbs Causeway, Patchway, Bristol	10th
Henley Hawks	Dry Leas	4,000	Henley-on-Thames, Oxfordshire	9th
London Irish Wild Geese	Hazelwood	2,000	Sunbury-on-Thames, Surrey	13th
Old Redcliffians	Scotland Lane	1,000	Brislington, Bristol	Promoted from National 3 South West (champions)
Redingensians Rams	Old Bath Road	1,250	Sonning, Reading, Berkshire	6th
Redruth	The Recreation Ground	3,500 (580 seats)	Redruth, Cornwall	5th
Taunton Titans	Hyde Park	2,000 (198 seats)	Taunton, Somerset	4th
Tonbridge Juddians	The Slade	1,500	Tonbridge, Kent	Promoted from National 3 London & SE (champions)
Wimbledon	Beverley Meads	1,000	Raynes Park, Merton, London	Promoted from National 3 London & SE (play-off)
Worthing Raiders	Roundstone Lane	1,500 (100 seats)	Angmering, West Sussex	12th

== League table ==
2017–18 National League 2 South table
Pos	Team	Pld	W	D	L	PF	PA	PD	TB	LB	Pts	Qualification
1	Cinderford (C)	30	29	0	1	1070	493	+577	27	0	143	Promoted
2	Chinnor (P)	30	26	1	3	1010	679	+331	25	0	131	Promotion play-off
3	Redingensians Rams	30	21	1	8	927	611	+316	21	5	112	
4	Taunton Titans	30	20	0	10	988	745	+243	18	3	101	
5	Redruth	30	16	0	14	846	708	+138	18	7	89	
6	Tonbridge Juddians	30	17	1	12	749	649	+100	11	5	86	
7	Worthing Raiders	30	14	0	16	824	970	−146	19	6	81	
8	Bury St Edmunds	30	14	0	16	803	786	+17	14	7	77	
9	Henley Hawks	30	12	2	16	755	882	−127	14	7	73	
10	Canterbury	30	13	1	16	722	733	−11	12	6	72	
11	Clifton	30	11	1	18	666	858	−192	12	5	63	
12	Old Redcliffians	30	9	2	19	708	915	−207	12	6	58	
13	London Irish Wild Geese	30	9	0	21	777	948	−171	15	6	57	
14	Barnstaple (R)	30	10	1	19	608	848	−240	7	6	55	Relegated
15	Wimbledon (R)	30	9	0	21	660	943	−283	10	4	50	Relegated
16	Broadstreet (R)	30	5	0	25	572	917	−345	8	7	35	Relegated

Updated to match(es) played on 28 April 2018. Source: "National League 2 South". NCA Rugby.
Rules for classification: If teams are level at any stage, tiebreakers are applied in the following order:
1. Number of matches won
2. Difference between points for and against
3. Total number of points for
4. Aggregate number of points scored in matches between tied teams
5. Number of matches won excluding the first match, then the second and so on until the tie is settled
  (C) Champion; (P) Promoted; (R) Relegated

== Results ==
=== Round 1 ===
2 September 2017
14:30

Clifton	24 – 24	Chinnor (BP)
	Report

Station Road
Attendance: 137
Referee: Ben Russell

2 September 2017
15:00

Bury St Edmunds	17 – 50	Tonbridge Juddians (BP)
	Report

The Haberden
Attendance: 531
Referee: Neil Chivers

2 September 2017
15:00

Canterbury	17 – 39	Cinderford (BP)
	Report

The Marine Travel Ground
Attendance: 234
Referee: Shane Lewis

2 September 2017
15:00

Henley Hawks	28 – 24	Redingensians Rams (BP)
	Report

Dry Leas
Attendance: 575
Referee: Ben Wilde

2 September 2017
15:00

(BP) Redruth	58 – 10	Old Redcliffians
	Report

The Recreation Ground
Attendance: 903
Referee: Adam Wookey

2 September 2017
15:00

(BP) Taunton Titans	41 – 21	Broadstreet
	Report

Hyde Park
Attendance: 425
Referee: Jack Sutton

2 September 2017
15:00

Wimbledon	13 – 33	Barnstaple (BP)
	Report

Beverley Meads
Attendance: 250
Referee: George Selwood

2 September 2017
15:00

(BP) Worthing Raiders	27 – 22	London Irish Wild Geese (BP)
	Report

Roundstone Lane
Attendance: 472
Referee: Phillip Davies

=== Round 2 ===
9 September 2017
14:30

(BP) Barnstaple	29 – 24	Redruth (BP)
	Report

Pottingham Road
Attendance: 850
Referee: Charlie Gayther

9 September 2017
14:30

(BP) Broadstreet	16 – 20	Bury St Edmunds
	Report

The Ivor Preece Field
Attendance: 225
Referee: James O'Brien

9 September 2017
14:30

(BP) Redingensians Rams	44 – 16	London Irish Wild Geese
	Report

Old Bath Road
Attendance: 186
Referee: Andrew Wigley

9 September 2017
15:00

(BP) Chinnor	39 – 20	Henley Hawks
	Report

Kingsey Road
Attendance: 1,016
Referee: Richard Haughton

9 September 2017
15:00

(BP) Cinderford	57 – 5	Clifton
	Report

Dockham Road
Attendance: 311
Referee: Adam Wookey

9 September 2017
15:00

Old Redcliffians	10 – 48	Taunton Titans (BP)
	Report

Scotland Lane
Attendance: 260
Referee: Ben Russell

9 September 2017
15:00

Tonbridge Juddians	24 – 36	Canterbury (BP)
	Report

The Slade
Attendance: 350
Referee: Alexis Manley

9 September 2017
15:00

Wimbledon	15 – 31	Worthing Raiders (BP)
	Report

Beverley Meads
Attendance: 90
Referee: Ben Wilde

=== Round 3 ===
16 September 2017
14:30

Clifton	14 – 24	Tonbridge Juddians
	Report

Station Road
Attendance: 139
Referee: Shane Lewis

16 September 2017
15:00

Bury St Edmunds	28 – 20	Old Redcliffians
	Report

The Haberden
Attendance: 291
Referee: Thomas Davis

16 September 2017
15:00

(BP) Canterbury	41 – 7	Broadstreet
	Report

The Marine Travel Ground
Attendance: 231
Referee: Adam Wookey

16 September 2017
15:00

Henley Hawks	17 – 90	Cinderford
	Report

Dry Leas
Attendance: 280
Referee: Jack Lewars

16 September 2017
15:00

(BP) London Irish Wild Geese	24 – 43	Chinnor (BP)
	Report

Hazelwood
Attendance: 250
Referee: Gareth Holsgrove

16 September 2017
15:00

(BP) Redruth	24 – 15	Wimbledon
	Report

The Recreation Ground
Attendance: 710
Referee: Luke Haskins

16 September 2017
15:00

(BP) Taunton Titans	52 – 3	Barnstaple
	Report

Hyde Park
Attendance: 550
Referee: Alexis Manley

16 September 2017
15:00

Worthing Raiders	30 – 40	Redingensians Rams (BP)
	Report

Roundstone Lane
Attendance: 572
Referee: Charles Gayther

=== Round 4 ===
23 September 2017
14:00

Redruth	20 – 19	Worthing Raiders (BP)
	Report

The Recreation Ground
Attendance: 694
Referee: Ben Russell

23 September 2017
14:30

Barnstaple	24 – 39	Bury St Edmunds (BP)
	Report

Pottingham Road
Attendance: 525
Referee: George Selwood

23 September 2017
14:30

(2BP) Broadstreet	32 – 35	Clifton (BP)
	Report

The Ivor Preece Field
Attendance: 267
Referee: Charlie Gayther

23 September 2017
15:00

(BP) Chinnor	36 – 14	Redingensians Rams
	Report

Kingsey Road
Attendance: 600
Referee: Sara Cox

23 September 2017
15:00

(BP) Cinderford	29 – 21	London Irish Wild Geese
	Report

Dockham Road
Attendance: 290
Referee: Richard Haughton

23 September 2017
15:00

(BP) Old Redcliffians	24 – 34	Canterbury (BP)
	Report

Scotland Lane
Attendance: 200
Referee: Nick Wood

23 September 2017
15:00

Tonbridge Juddians	20 – 14	Henley Hawks (BP)
	Report

The Slade
Attendance: 210
Referee: Luke Davies

23 September 2017
15:00

(BP) Wimbledon	27 – 42	Taunton Titans (BP)
	Report

Beverley Meads
Attendance: 250
Referee: Jack Lewars

=== Round 5 ===
30 September 2017
14:30

(BP) Clifton	45 – 21	Old Redcliffians
	Report

Station Road
Attendance: 393
Referee: Harry Walbaum

30 September 2017
14:30

(2BP) Redingensians Rams	36 – 37	Cinderford (BP)
	Report

Old Bath Road
Attendance: 245
Referee: Finlay Brown

30 September 2017
15:00

(BP) Bury St Edmunds	48 – 23	Wimbledon
	Report

The Haberden
Attendance: 341
Referee: Benjamin Wilde

30 September 2017
15:00

(BP) Canterbury	41 – 31	Barnstaple (BP)
	Report

The Marine Travel Ground
Attendance: 256
Referee: Alexis Manley

30 September 2017
15:00

(BP) Henley Hawks	41 – 17	Broadstreet
	Report

Dry Leas
Attendance: 275
Referee: Ben Russell

30 September 2017
15:00

(BP) Taunton Titans	34 – 17	Redruth
	Report

Hyde Park
Attendance: 692
Referee: Alexander Thomas

30 September 2017
15:00

Tonbridge Juddians	26 – 37	London Irish Wild Geese (BP)
	Report

The Slade
Attendance: 290
Referee: Ieuan Davies

30 September 2017
15:00

Worthing Raiders	14 – 45	Chinnor (BP)
	Report

Roundstone Lane
Attendance: 465
Referee: James Clarke

=== Round 6 ===
7 October 2017
14:00

Redruth	12 – 9	Bury St Edmunds (BP)
	Report

The Recreation Ground
Attendance: 545
Referee: George Selwood

7 October 2017
14:30

(BP) Barnstaple	37 – 24	Clifton (BP)
	Report

Pottingham Road
Attendance: 450
Referee: Benjamin Russell

7 October 2017
14:30

(BP) Broadstreet	53 – 40	London Irish Wild Geese (BP)
	Report

The Ivor Preece Field
Attendance: 321
Referee: Chris Bennett

7 October 2017
15:00

Cinderford	20 – 31	Chinnor (BP)
	Report

Dockham Road
Attendance: 390
Referee: Callum Sharp

7 October 2017
15:00

Old Redcliffians	25 – 25	Henley Hawks
	Report

Scotland Lane
Attendance: 211
Referee: Shane Lewis

7 October 2017
15:00

(BP) Taunton Titans	81 – 14	Worthing Raiders
	Report

Hyde Park
Attendance: 410
Referee: Adam Wookey

7 October 2017
15:00

(BP) Tonbridge Juddians	24 – 47	Redingensians Rams (BP)
	Report

The Slade
Attendance: 250
Referee: Charlie Gayther

7 October 2017
15:00

Wimbledon	7 – 22	Canterbury
	Report

Beverley Meads
Attendance: 250
Referee: Jack Sutton

=== Round 7 ===
14 October 2017
14:30

Clifton	25 – 20	Wimbledon (BP)
	Report

Station Road
Attendance: 143
Referee: Phillip Davis

14 October 2017
14:30

(BP) Redingensians Rams	47 – 19	Broadstreet
	Report

Old Bath Road
Attendance: 201
Referee: Ieuan Davies

14 October 2017
15:00

(BP) Bury St Edmunds	20 – 26	Taunton Titans
	Report

The Haberden
Attendance: 591
Referee: Alexis Manley

14 October 2017
15:00

Canterbury	18 – 16	Redruth (BP)
	Report

The Marine Travel Ground
Attendance: 576
Referee: George Selwood

14 October 2017
15:00

Chinnor	24 – 20	Tonbridge Juddians (2BP)
	Report

Kingsey Road
Attendance: 610
Referee: Jonathan Cook

14 October 2017
15:00

(BP) Henley Hawks	29 – 22	Barnstaple (BP)
	Report

Dry Leas
Attendance: 345
Referee: Charles Gayther

14 October 2017
15:00

London Irish Wild Geese	53 – 22	Old Redcliffians
	Report

Hazelwood
Attendance: 200
Referee: Jack Sutton

14 October 2017
15:00

(2BP) Worthing Raiders	27 – 29	Cinderford (BP)
	Report

Roundstone Lane
Attendance: 472
Referee: Veryan Boscawen

=== Round 8 ===
21 October 2017
14:30

Barnstaple	15 – 6	London Irish Wild Geese
	Report

Pottingham Road
Attendance: 350
Referee: Nicholas Wood

21 October 2017
14:30

Broadstreet	21 – 31	Chinnor (BP)
	Report

The Ivor Preece Field
Attendance: 324
Referee: James O'Brien

21 October 2017
14:30

(BP) Redingensians Rams	33 – 26	Old Redcliffians (2BP)
	Report

Old Bath Road
Attendance: 168
Referee: Benjamin Wilde

21 October 2017
15:00

(BP) Bury St Edmunds	37 – 30	Worthing Raiders (2BP)
	Report

The Haberden
Attendance: 501
Referee: Jonathan Cook

21 October 2017
15:00

(BP) Redruth	36 – 3	Clifton
	Report

The Recreation Ground
Attendance: 718
Referee: Jack Lewars

21 October 2017
15:00

Taunton Titans	19 – 14	Canterbury (BP)
	Report

Hyde Park
Attendance: 410
Referee: Adam Wookey

21 October 2017
15:00

Tonbridge Juddians	15 – 33	Cinderford (BP)
	Report

The Slade
Attendance: 250
Referee: Luke Davies

21 October 2017
15:00

(BP) Wimbledon	26 – 55	Henley Hawks (BP)
	Report

Beverley Meads
Attendance: 200
Referee: Richard Haughton

=== Round 9 ===
28 October 2017
14:30

(BP) Clifton	33 – 43	Taunton Titans (BP)
	Report

Station Road
Attendance: 159
Referee: Jonathan Cook

28 October 2017
14:30

(BP) Redingensians Rams	33 – 10	Barnstaple
	Report

Old Bath Road
Attendance: 348
Referee: Charlie Gayther

28 October 2017
15:00

Canterbury	21 – 29	Bury St Edmunds (BP)
	Report

The Marine Travel Ground
Attendance: 312
Referee: Veryan Boscawen

28 October 2017
15:00

(BP) Chinnor	42 – 27	Old Redcliffians (BP)
	Report

Kingsey Road
Attendance: 572
Referee: Robert Bourke

28 October 2017
15:00

(BP) Cinderford	34 – 10	Broadstreet
	Report

Dockham Road
Attendance: 320
Referee: Jack Lewars

28 October 2017
15:00

Henley Hawks	22 – 42	Redruth (BP)
	Report

Dry Leas
Attendance: 415
Referee: Andrew Wigley

28 October 2017
15:00

Worthing Raiders	23 – 19	Tonbridge Juddians (BP)
	Report

Roundstone Lane
Attendance: 582
Referee: Nicholas Wood

28 October 2017
17:00

(BP) London Irish Wild Geese	60 – 6	Wimbledon
	Report

Hazelwood
Attendance: 300
Referee: Ross Mabon

=== Round 10 ===
4 November 2017
14:00

(BP) Barnstaple	27 – 32	Chinnor (BP)
	Report

Pottingham Road
Attendance: 525
Referee: Adam Wookey

4 November 2017
14:30

Broadstreet	7 – 52	Tonbridge Juddians (BP)
	Report

Ivor Preece Field
Attendance: 179
Referee: Jack Sutton

4 November 2017
14:30

(BP) Old Redcliffians	33 – 43	Cinderford (BP)
	Report

Scotland Lane
Attendance: 207
Referee: Dan Parrott

4 November 2017
14:30

(BP) Redruth	46 – 38	London Irish Wild Geese (BP)
	Report

The Recreation Ground
Attendance: 765
Referee: Daniel Collins

4 November 2017
14:30

Wimbledon	13 – 24	Redingensians Rams (BP)
	Report

Beverley Meads
Attendance: 250
Referee: Luke Davies

4 November 2017
15:00

(BP) Bury St Edmunds	37 – 19	Clifton
	Report

The Haberden
Attendance: 497
Referee: Thomas Davis

4 November 2017
15:00

(BP) Canterbury	50 – 26	Worthing Raiders (BP)
	Report

The Marine Travel Ground
Attendance: 267
Referee: Gareth Holsgrove

4 November 2017
15:00

(BP) Taunton Titans	31 – 42	Henley Hawks (BP)
	Report

Hyde Park
Attendance: 625
Referee: Richard Haughton

=== Round 11 ===
11 November 2017
14:00

Redingensians Rams	21 – 12	Redruth
	Report

Old Bath Road
Attendance: 194
Referee: Richard Haughton

11 November 2017
14:00

(BP) Worthing Raiders	42 – 14	Broadstreet
	Report

Roundstone Lane
Attendance: 408
Referee: Andrew MacNeaney

11 November 2017
14:30

(BP) Cinderford	32 – 19	Barnstaple
	Report

Dockham Road
Attendance: 249
Referee: Jack Sutton

11 November 2017
14:30

Clifton	25 – 15	Canterbury
	Report

Station Road
Attendance: 101
Referee: Adam Wookey

11 November 2017
14:30

(BP) Tonbridge Juddians	33 – 24	Old Redcliffians
	Report

The Slade
Attendance: 122
Referee: Thomas Davis

11 November 2017
15:00

(BP) Chinnor	64 – 22	Wimbledon
	Report

Kingsey Road
Attendance: 268
Referee: Benjamin Russell

11 November 2017
15:00

Henley Hawks	27 – 20	Bury St Edmunds (BP)
	Report

Dry Leas
Attendance: 305
Referee: Charlie Gayther

11 November 2017
15:00

(BP) London Irish Wild Geese	45 – 38	Taunton Titans (2BP)
	Report

Hazelwood
Attendance: 250
Referee: Ben Wild

=== Round 12 ===
25 November 2017
14:00

Barnstaple	22 – 3	Tonbridge Juddians
	Report

Pottingham Road
Attendance: 539
Referee: Jonathan Cook

25 November 2017
14:30

(2BP) Clifton	34 – 36	Worthing Raiders (BP)
	Report

Station Road
Attendance: 92
Referee: Andrew Wigley

25 November 2017
14:30

Old Redcliffians	22 – 19	Broadstreet (BP)
	Report

Scotland Lane
Attendance: 112
Referee: Ben Russell

25 November 2017
14:30

(BP) Redruth	13 – 20	Chinnor (BP)
	Report

The Recreation Ground
Attendance: 878
Referee: Shane Lewis

25 November 2017
14:30

Wimbledon	23 – 31	Cinderford (BP)
	Report

Beverley Meads
Attendance: 200
Referee: Luke Davies

25 November 2017
15:00

(BP) Bury St Edmunds	35 – 24	London Irish Wild Geese (BP)
	Report

The Haberden
Attendance: 545
Referee: Jack Lewars

25 November 2017
15:00

(BP) Canterbury	25 – 24	Henley Hawks (2BP)
	Report

The Marine Travel Ground
Attendance: 283
Referee: Robert Bourke

25 November 2017
15:00

(BP) Taunton Titans	31 – 21	Redingensians Rams
	Report

Hyde Park
Attendance: 480
Referee: Nick Wood

=== Round 13 ===
2 December 2017
14:00

(BP) Redingensians Rams	29 – 17	Bury St Edmunds
	Report

Old Bath Road
Attendance: 183
Referee: Benjamin Russell

2 December 2017
14:00

(BP) Worthing Raiders	40 – 34	Old Redcliffians (2BP)
	Report

Roundstone Lane
Attendance: 431
Referee: Jack Sutton

2 December 2017
14:30

Broadstreet	15 – 27	Barnstaple (BP)
	Report

The Ivor Preece Field
Attendance: 127
Referee: Jack Lewars

2 December 2017
14:30

(BP) Cinderford	49 – 19	Redruth
	Report

Dockham Road
Attendance: 220
Referee: Shane Lewis

2 December 2017
15:00

Chinnor	13 – 7	Taunton Titans (BP)
	Report

Kingsey Road
Attendance: 331
Referee: Veryan Boscawen

2 December 2017
14:30

(BP) Tonbridge Juddians	46 – 15	Wimbledon
	Report

The Slade
Attendance: 294
Referee: Alexis Manley

2 December 2017
15:00

(BP) Henley Hawks	30 – 20	Clifton
	Report

Dry Leas
Attendance: 270
Referee: Andrew MacNeaney

2 December 2017
15:00

(BP) London Irish Wild Geese	22 – 26	Canterbury (BP)
	Report

Hazelwood
Attendance: 250
Referee: Tom Davis

=== Round 14 ===
9 December 2017
14:00

Barnstaple	22 – 22	Old Redcliffians
	Report

Pottingham Road
Attendance: 586
Referee: Harry Walbaum

9 December 2017
14:00

(BP) Redruth	45 – 11	Tonbridge Juddians
	Report

The Recreation Ground
Attendance: 890
Referee: Luke Davies

9 December 2017
14:00

(BP) Wimbledon	24 – 30	Broadstreet (BP)
	Report

Beverley Meads
Attendance: 250
Referee: Jonathan Cook

9 December 2017
14:30

(2BP) Clifton	31 – 33	London Irish Wild Geese (BP)
	Report

Station Road
Attendance: 109
Referee: Charlies Gayther

9 December 2017
15:00

(2BP) Bury St Edmunds	34 – 37	Chinnor (BP)
	Report

The Haberden
Attendance: 573
Referee: Ieuan Davies

9 December 2017
15:00

Canterbury	15 – 40	Redingensians Rams (BP)
	Report

The Marine Travel Ground
Attendance: 247
Referee: Alexis Manley

9 December 2017
15:00

(BP) Henley Hawks	43 – 28	Worthing Raiders (BP)
	Report

Dry Leas
Attendance: 320
Referee: Andrew MacNeaney

9 December 2017
15:00

Taunton Titans	14 – 33	Cinderford (BP)
	Report

Hyde Park
Attendance: 525
Referee: Calum Howard

=== Round 15 ===
16 December 2017
14:00

(2BP) Old Redcliffians	28 – 29	Wimbledon (BP)
	Report

Scotland Lane
Attendance: 159 (Note: The Rugby Paper reported an attendance of 159 for while the NCA had an attendance of 63 for the game between Old Redcliffians and Wimbledon on 16 December 2017. From discussion with Old Redcliffians staff it appears they had counted 63 supporters at the start of the game but that once early 2nd and 3rd XV games had finished this figure rose to 159.)
Referee: Jack Lewars

16 December 2017
14:00

(BP) Redingensians Rams	43 – 16	Clifton
	Report

Old Bath Road
Attendance: 205
Referee: Andrew MacNeaney

16 December 2017
14:00

(BP) Tonbridge Juddians	26 – 20	Taunton Titans (BP)
	Report

The Slade
Attendance: 351
Referee: Phillip Davies

16 December 2017
14:00

(BP) Worthing Raiders	36 – 29	Barnstaple (2BP)
	Report

Roundstone Lane
Attendance: 447
Referee: Charlie Gayther

16 December 2017
14:30

Broadstreet	11 – 21	Redruth
	Report

The Ivor Preece Field
Attendance: 269
Referee: Chris Bennett

16 December 2017
14:30

(BP) Cinderford	45 – 29	Bury St Edmunds (BP)
	Report

Dockham Road
Attendance: 305
Referee: Callum Sharp

16 December 2017
15:00

(BP) Chinnor	41 – 7	Canterbury
	Report

Kingsey Road
Attendance: 308
Referee: Nicholas Wood

16 December 2017
15:00

(BP) London Irish Wild Geese	17 – 24	Henley Hawks (BP)
	Report

Hazelwood
Attendance: 250
Referee: Louis Briggs

=== Round 16 ===
23 December 2017
14:00

(BP) Redruth	41 – 0	Barnstaple
	Report

The Recreation Ground
Attendance: 910
Referee: Jack Sutton

23 December 2017
14:00

(BP) Worthing Raiders	35 – 28	Wimbledon (2BP)
	Report

Roundstone Lane
Attendance: 441
Referee: Jack Lewars

23 December 2017
14:30

Clifton	20 – 33	Cinderford (BP)
	Report

Station Road
Attendance: 209
Referee: Nick Wood

23 December 2017
15:00

(BP) Bury St Edmunds	44 – 15	Broadstreet
	Report

The Haberden
Attendance: 487
Referee: Timothy Allen

23 December 2017
15:00

(BP) Canterbury	19 – 22	Tonbridge Juddians
	Report

The Marine Travel Ground
Attendance: 587
Referee: Benjamin Wilde

23 December 2017
15:00

(2BP) Henley Hawks	28 – 33	Chinnor (BP)
	Report

Dry Leas
Attendance: 940
Referee: Phillip Davies

23 December 2017
15:00

London Irish Wild Geese	12 – 52	Redingensians Rams (BP)
	Report

Hazelwood
Attendance: 200
Referee: Adam Wookey

23 December 2017
15:00

(BP) Taunton Titans	36 – 17	Old Redcliffians
	Report

Hyde Park
Attendance: 625
Referee: George Selwood

=== Round 17 ===
6 January 2018
14:00

Barnstaple	12 – 53	Taunton Titans (BP)
	Report

Pottingham Road
Attendance: 725
Referee: Benjamin Russell

6 January 2018
14:00

(BP) Old Redcliffians	24 – 14	Bury St Edmunds
	Report

Scotland Lane
Attendance: 131
Referee: George Selwood

6 January 2018
14:00

(BP) Redingensians Rams	39 – 26	Worthing Raiders (BP)
	Report

Old Bath Road
Attendance: 312
Referee: Jack Sutton

6 January 2018
14:00

Tonbridge Juddians	17 – 10	Clifton (BP)
	Report

The Slade
Attendance: 200
Referee: Nicholas Wood

6 January 2018
15:00

(BP) Wimbledon	33 – 28	Redruth (2BP)
	Report

Beverley Meads
Attendance: 250
Referee: Philip Davies

6 January 2018
15:00

Broadstreet	12 – 7	Canterbury (BP)
	Report

Ivor Preece Field
Attendance: 167
Referee: Harry Walbaum

6 January 2018
14:30

(BP) Cinderford	34 – 6	Henley Hawks
	Report

Dockham Road
Attendance: 253
Referee: Jack Lewars

6 January 2018
15:00

Chinnor	20 – 35	London Irish Wild Geese (BP)
	Report

Kingsey Road
Attendance: 283
Referee: Robert Bourke

=== Round 18 ===
13 January 2018
14:00

(2BP) Redingensians Rams	29 – 31	Chinnor (BP)
	Report

Old Bath Road
Attendance: 407
Referee: Nicholas Wood

13 January 2018
14:00

(BP) Worthing Raiders	46 – 43	Redruth (2BP)
	Report

Roundstone Lane
Attendance: 461
Referee: George Selwood

13 January 2018
14:30

(BP) Clifton	31 – 24	Broadstreet (2BP)
	Report

Station Road
Attendance: 176
Referee: Luke Davies

13 January 2018
15:00

(BP) Bury St Edmunds	39 – 25	Barnstaple
	Report

The Haberden
Attendance: 250 (Note: The Rugby Paper reported an attendance of 250 for while the NCA had an attendance of 517 for the game between Bury St Edmunds and Barnstaple on 13 January 2018. From talking to the Bury St Edmunds club secretary it appears that the Rugby Paper figure was correct.)
Referee: James Clarke

13 January 2018
15:00

(BP) Canterbury	48 – 29	Old Redcliffians (BP)
	Report

The Marine Travel Ground
Attendance: 237
Referee: Robert Bourke

13 January 2018
15:00

(BP) Henley Hawks	15 – 20	Tonbridge Juddians
	Report

Dry Leas
Attendance: 655
Referee: Thomas Davis

13 January 2018
15:00

London Irish Wild Geese	17 – 31	Cinderford (BP)
	Report

Hazelwood
Attendance: 250
Referee: Jack Lewars

13 January 2018
15:00

(BP) Taunton Titans	66 – 15	Wimbledon
	Report

Hyde Park
Attendance: 525
Referee: Charlie Gayther

=== Round 19 ===
20 January 2018
14:00

Barnstaple	24 – 7	Canterbury
	Report

Pottingham Road
Attendance: 454
Referee: Louis Biggs

20 January 2018
14:00

(BP) Redruth	38 – 22	Taunton Titans
	Report

The Recreation Ground
Attendance: 825
Referee: Nicholas Wood

20 January 2018
14:00

(BP) Wimbledon	32 – 12	Bury St Edmunds
	Report

Beverley Meads
Attendance: 200
Referee: Andrew MacNeaney

20 January 2018
14:30

Broadstreet	12 – 42	Henley Hawks (BP)
	Report

The Ivor Preece Field
Attendance: 147
Referee: James Clarke

20 January 2018
14:30

(BP) Cinderford	26 – 5	Redingensians Rams
	Report

Dockham Road
Attendance: 325
Referee: Harry Walbaum

20 January 2018
14:30

(BP) Old Redcliffians	34 – 0	Clifton
	Report

Scotland Lane
Attendance: 210
Referee: Adam Wookey

20 January 2018
15:00

(BP) Chinnor	50 – 10	Worthing Raiders
	Report

Kingsey Road
Attendance: 197
Referee: Shane Lewis

20 January 2018
15:00

London Irish Wild Geese	12 – 28	Tonbridge Juddians
	Report

Hazelwood
Attendance: 299
Referee: Mike Hudson

=== Round 20 ===
27 January 2018
14:00

Bury St Edmunds	27 – 14	Redruth
	Report

The Haberden
Attendance: 413
Referee: Jonathan Cook

27 January 2018
15:00

Redingensians Rams	12 – 12	Tonbridge Juddians
	Report

Old Bath Road
Attendance: 235
Referee: Andrew MacNeaney

27 January 2018
14:00

(BP) Worthing Raiders	19 – 25	Taunton Titans
	Report

Roundstone Lane
Attendance: 481
Referee: Adam Wookey

27 January 2018
14:00

(BP) Clifton	24 – 19	Barnstaple (BP)
	Report

Station Road
Attendance: 159
Referee: Benjamin Russell

27 January 2018
15:00

Canterbury	17 – 7	Wimbledon
	Report

The Marine Travel Ground
Attendance: 312
Referee: Callum Howard

27 January 2018
15:00

Chinnor	14 – 26	Cinderford (BP)
	Report

Kingsey Road
Attendance: 798
Referee: Gareth Holsgrove

27 January 2018
15:00

(BP) Henley Hawks	22 – 20	Old Redcliffians (BP)
	Report

Dry Leas
Attendance: 255
Referee: Charlie Gayther

27 January 2018
15:00

London Irish Wild Geese	0 – 34	Broadstreet (BP)
	Report

Hazelwood
Attendance: 99
Referee: Nick Wood

=== Round 21 ===
3 February 2018
14:00

Barnstaple	10 – 7	Henley Hawks (BP)
	Report

Pottingham Road
Attendance: 428
Referee: Shane Lewis

3 February 2018
14:00

(BP) Redruth	31 – 19	Canterbury
	Report

The Recreation Ground
Attendance: 615
Referee: Charlie Gayther

3 February 2018
14:30

Broadstreet	14 – 36	Redingensians Rams (BP)
	Report

The Ivor Preece Field
Attendance: 246
Referee: Luke Davies

3 February 2018
14:30

(BP) Cinderford	29 – 12	Worthing Raiders
	Report

Dockham Road
Attendance: 200
Referee: Ben Russell

3 February 2018
14:30

Old Redcliffians	20 – 14	London Irish Wild Geese (BP)
	Report

Scotland Lane
Attendance: 110
Referee: Jack Lewars

3 February 2018
14:30

(BP) Tonbridge Juddians	13 – 14	Chinnor
	Report

The Slade
Attendance: 204
Referee: Veryan Boscawen

3 February 2018
14:30

Wimbledon	20 – 15	Clifton (BP)
	Report

Beverley Meads
Attendance: 250
Referee: James Clarke

3 February 2018
15:00

Taunton Titans	24 – 10	Bury St Edmunds
	Report

Hyde Park
Attendance: 525
Referee: Philip Davies

=== Round 22 ===
10 February 2018
14:00

Worthing Raiders	24 – 18	Bury St Edmunds (BP)
	Report

Roundstone Lane
Attendance: 309
Referee: Charlie Gayther

10 February 2018
14:30

(BP) Cinderford	26 – 0	Tonbridge Juddians
	Report

Dockham Road
Attendance: 304
Referee: Shane Lewis

10 February 2018
14:30

Clifton	6 – 24	Redruth (BP)
	Report

Station Road
Attendance: 114
Referee: Michael Woods

10 February 2018
14:30

Henley Hawks	0 – 19	Wimbledon
	Report

Dry Leas
Attendance: 210
Referee: Richard Haughton

10 February 2018
14:30

(BP) Old Redcliffians	14 – 21	Redingensians Rams
	Report

Scotland Lane
Attendance: 117
Referee: Alexis Manley

10 February 2018
15:00

Canterbury	12 – 21	Taunton Titans
	Report

The Marine Travel Ground
Attendance: 132
Referee: Daniel Collins

10 February 2018
15:00

(BP) Chinnor	25 – 17	Broadstreet (BP)
	Report

Kingsey Road
Attendance: 230
Referee: Andrew MacNeaney

10 February 2018
15:00

(BP) London Irish Wild Geese	37 – 22	Barnstaple
	Report

Hazelwood
Attendance: 125
Referee: James Clarke

=== Round 23 ===
17 February 2018
14:00

(2BP) Barnstaple	31 – 38	Redingensians Rams (BP)
	Report

Pottingham Road
Attendance: 637
Referee: Jack Lewars

17 February 2018
14:30

Broadstreet	3 – 36	Cinderford (BP)
	Report

The Ivor Preece Field
Attendance: 365
Referee: Benjamin Davis

17 February 2018
14:30

(BP) Old Redcliffians	19 – 24	Chinnor (BP)
	Report

Scotland Lane
Attendance: 95
Referee: Nick Wood

17 February 2018
14:30

(BP) Redruth	49 – 38	Henley Hawks (BP)
	Report

The Recreation Ground
Attendance: 710
Referee: Adam Wookey

17 February 2018
14:30

Tonbridge Juddians	25 – 21	Worthing Raiders (BP)
	Report

The Slade
Attendance: 247
Referee: Phillip Davies

17 February 2018
14:30

(BP) Wimbledon	46 – 21	London Irish Wild Geese
	Report

Beverley Meads
Attendance: 250
Referee: Daniel Collins

17 February 2018
15:00

(BP) Bury St Edmunds	46 – 26	Canterbury (BP)
	Report

The Haberden
Attendance: 523
Referee: Luke Davies

17 February 2018
15:00

(BP) Taunton Titans	29 – 27	Clifton (BP)
	Report

Hyde Park
Attendance: 625
Referee: Sara Cox

=== Round 24 ===
3 March 2018
14:30

Cinderford	P – P	Old Redcliffians

Dockham Road

- Postponed due to bad weather (snow). Game rescheduled to 17 March 2018.

3 March 2018
14:30

Clifton	P – P	Bury St Edmunds

Station Road

- Postponed due to bad weather (snow). Game rescheduled to 17 March 2018.

3 March 2018
14:30

(BP) Redingensians Rams	24 – 15	Wimbledon
	Report

Old Bath Road
Attendance: 246
Referee: Jack Sutton

3 March 2018
14:30

Tonbridge Juddians	P – P	Broadstreet

The Slade

- Postponed due to bad weather (snow). Game rescheduled to 17 March 2018.

3 March 2018
15:00

Chinnor	P – P	Barnstaple

The Recreation Ground

- Postponed due to bad weather (snow). Game rescheduled to 17 March 2018.

3 March 2018
15:00

Henley Hawks	P – P	Taunton Titans

Dry Leas

- Postponed due to bad weather (snow). Game rescheduled to 17 March 2018.

3 March 2018
15:00

London Irish Wild Geese	P – P	Redruth

Hazelwood

- Postponed due to bad weather (snow). Game rescheduled to 17 March 2018.

3 March 2018
15:00

Worthing Raiders	P – P	Canterbury

Roundstone Lane

- Postponed due to bad weather (snow). Game rescheduled to 17 March 2018.

=== Round 25 ===
10 March 2018
14:30

(BP) Barnstaple	18 – 20	Cinderford
	Report

Pottingham Road
Attendance: 530
Referee: Adam Wookey

10 March 2018
14:30

(BP) Broadstreet	29 – 14	Worthing Raiders
	Report

The Ivor Preece Field
Attendance: 245
Referee: Daniel Woods

10 March 2018
14:30

Old Redcliffians	14 – 10	Tonbridge Juddians (BP)
	Report

Scotland Lane
Attendance: 99
Referee: Philip Davies

10 March 2018
14:30

(BP) Taunton Titans	31 – 24	London Irish Wild Geese (2BP)
	Report

Hyde Park
Attendance: 325
Referee: Michael Woods

10 March 2018
14:30

(BP) Wimbledon	27 – 37	Chinnor (BP)
	Report

Beverley Meads
Attendance: 300
Referee: Jonathan Cook

10 March 2018
14:45

(BP) Redruth	25 – 19	Redingensians Rams (BP)
	Report

The Recreation Ground
Attendance: 702
Referee: Veryan Boscawen

10 March 2018
15:00

Bury St Edmunds	18 – 27	Henley Hawks (BP)
	Report

The Haberden
Attendance: 497
Referee: Benjamin Wilde

10 March 2018
15:00

(BP) Canterbury	17 – 24	Clifton
	Report

The Marine Travel Ground
Attendance: 234
Referee: James Clarke

=== Round 24 (rescheduled games) ===
17 March 2018
14:00

(BP) Worthing Raiders	22 – 17	Canterbury (BP)
	Report

Roundstone Lane
Attendance: 205
Referee: Adam Wookey

- Rescheduled from 3 March 2018.

17 March 2018
14:30

(BP) Cinderford	40 – 12	Old Redcliffians
	Report

Dockham Road
Attendance: 154
Referee: Jack Sutton

- Rescheduled from 3 March 2018.

17 March 2018
14:30

(BP) Clifton	29 – 7	Bury St Edmunds
	Report

Station Road
Attendance: 89
Referee: Benjamin Russell

- Rescheduled from 3 March 2018.

17 March 2018
14:30

Tonbridge Juddians	22 – 14	Broadstreet
	Report

The Slade
Attendance: 250
Referee: Jack Lewars

- Rescheduled from 3 March 2018.

17 March 2018
15:00

(BP) Chinnor	41 – 12	Barnstaple
	Report

Kingsey Road
Attendance: 109
Referee: Robert Bourke

- Rescheduled from 3 March 2018.

17 March 2018
15:00

(BP) London Irish Wild Geese	39 – 32	Redruth (2BP)
	Report

Hazelwood
Attendance: 132 (Note: The Rugby Paper reported an attendance of 132 for while the NCA had an attendance of 109 for the game between London Irish Wild Geese and Redruth on 17 March 2018. As Chinnor also achieved an attendance 109 in their game on the same date, I believe that this is a mistake by the NCA and that the Rugby Paper recording was correct due to the extreme unlikeness of two teams getting the exact attendance on the same day, particularly as it was not a rounded up/down figure.)
Referee: Thomas Davis

- Rescheduled from 3 March 2018.

18 March 2018
14:00

Henley Hawks	P – P	Taunton Titans

Dry Leas

- Game originally rescheduled from 3 March 2018 but postponed again due to bad weather (snow). Game to be rescheduled for 30 March 2018.

=== Round 26 ===
24 March 2018
14:30

(BP) Broadstreet	20 – 23	Old Redcliffians
	Report

The Ivor Preece Field
Attendance: 237
Referee: Louis Biggs

24 March 2018
14:30

(BP) Cinderford	45 – 8	Wimbledon
	Report

Dockham Road
Attendance: 223
Referee: Shane Lewis

24 March 2018
14:30

(BP) Redingensians Rams	31 – 15	Taunton Titans
	Report

Old Bath Road
Attendance: 243
Referee: Alexis Manley

24 March 2018
14:30

(BP) Tonbridge Juddians	32 – 14	Barnstaple
	Report

The Slade
Attendance: 190
Referee: Jack Sutton

24 March 2018
15:00

(BP) Chinnor	34 – 33	Redruth (2BP)
	Report

Kingsey Road
Attendance: 283
Referee: Benjamin Russell

24 March 2018
15:00

Henley Hawks	30 – 30	Canterbury (BP)
	Report

Dry Leas
Attendance: 490
Referee: Charlie Gayther

24 March 2018
15:00

(BP) London Irish Wild Geese	29 – 50	Bury St Edmunds (BP)
	Report

Hazelwood
Attendance: 200
Referee: Matthew Astel

24 March 2018
15:00

(BP) Worthing Raiders	24 – 36	Clifton (BP)
	Report

Roundstone Lane
Attendance: 485
Referee: Luke Davies

=== Round 24 (rescheduled game) ===
30 March 2018
14:30

(BP) Henley Hawks	17 – 20	Taunton Titans
	Report

Dry Leas
Attendance: 180
Referee: Andrew Wigley

- Game originally rescheduled from 3 March 2018 & then 18 March 2018 when it was postponed again.

=== Round 27 ===
7 April 2018
14:30

Barnstaple	16 – 12	Broadstreet (BP)
	Report

Pottingham Park
Attendance: 545
Referee: Benjamin Russell

- Broadstreet are relegated.

7 April 2018
14:30

(BP) Clifton	29 – 22	Henley Hawks (BP)
	Report

Station Road
Attendance: 176
Referee: Jack Sutton

7 April 2018
15:00

Bury St Edmunds	27 – 24	Redingensians Rams (BP)
	Report

The Haberden
Attendance: 573
Referee: Timothy Allatt

7 April 2018
15:00

(BP) Canterbury	43 – 7	London Irish Wild Geese
	Report

The Marine Travel Ground
Attendance: 387
Referee: Michael Woods

7 April 2018
15:00

(BP) Old Redcliffians	37 – 31	Worthing Raiders (2BP)
	Report

Scotland Lane
Attendance: 147
Referee: Charlie Gayther

7 April 2018
15:00

Redruth	7 – 24	Cinderford
	Report

The Recreation Ground
Attendance: 920
Referee: Nick Wood

7 April 2018
15:00

(BP) Taunton Titans	43 – 56	Chinnor (BP)
	Report

Hyde Park
Attendance: 525
Referee: Andrew Wigley

7 April 2018
15:00

Wimbledon	22 – 17	Tonbridge Juddians (BP)

Beverley Meads
Attendance: 350
Referee: Ben Wilde

=== Round 28 ===
14 April 2018
14:00

(BP) Tonbridge Juddians	34 – 26	Redruth (BP)
	Report

The Slade
Attendance: 263
Referee: Calum Howard

14 April 2018
14:30

(BP) Broadstreet	29 – 41	Wimbledon (BP)
	Report

The Ivor Preece Field
Attendance: 297
Referee: Matthew Riley

14 April 2018
14:30

Redingensians Rams	21 – 14	Canterbury (BP)
	Report

Old Bath Road
Attendance: 232
Referee: Joe James

14 April 2018
15:00

(BP) Chinnor	28 – 27	Bury St Edmunds (2BP)
	Report

Kingsey Road
Attendance: 390
Referee: Daniel Collins

14 April 2018
15:00

(BP) Cinderford	41 – 24	Taunton Titans
	Report

Dockham Road
Attendance: 350
Referee: Gareth Holsgrove

14 April 2018
15:00

London Irish Wild Geese	17 – 29	Clifton (BP)
	Report

Hazelwood
Attendance: 150
Referee: Veryan Boscawen

14 April 2018
15:00

(BP) Old Redcliffians	46 – 16	Barnstaple
	Report

Scotland Lane
Attendance: 200
Referee: Jack Lewars

14 April 2018
15:00

(BP) Worthing Raiders	55 – 41	Henley Hawks (BP)
	Report

Roundstone Lane
Attendance: 483
Referee: James Clarke

=== Round 29 ===
21 April 2018
14:30

Barnstaple	22 – 36	Worthing Raiders (BP)
	Report

Pottingham Road
Attendance: 437
Referee: Nick Wood

21 April 2018
14:30

Clifton	19 – 29	Redingensians Rams (BP)
	Report

Station Road
Attendance: 163
Referee: Thomas Davis

21 April 2018
15:00

(BP) Bury St Edmunds	19 – 24	Cinderford
	Report

The Haberden
Attendance: 759
Referee: Gareth Holsgrove

- Cinderford are champions.

21 April 2018
15:00

(BP) Canterbury	52 – 29	Chinnor (BP)
	Report

The Marine Travel Ground
Attendance: 374
Referee: Alexis Manley

21 April 2018
15:00

Henley Hawks	19 – 36	London Irish Wild Geese (BP)
	Report

Dry Leas
Attendance: 520
Referee: Philip Davies

21 April 2018
15:00

(BP) Redruth	36 – 24	Broadstreet (BP)
	Report

The Recreation Ground
Attendance: 830
Referee: Charlie Gayther

21 April 2018
15:00

(BP) Taunton Titans	26 – 66	Tonbridge Juddians (BP)
	Report

Hyde Park
Attendance: 525
Referee: Andrew MacNeaney

21 April 2018
15:00

(BP) Wimbledon	55 – 17	Old Redcliffians
	Report

Beverley Meads
Attendance: 407
Referee: Robert Bourke

=== Round 30 ===
28 April 2018
15:00

Barnstaple	17 – 14	Wimbledon (BP)
	Report

Pottingham Road
Attendance: 786
Referee: Jonathan Cook

- Barnstaple and Wimbledon are both relegated.

28 April 2018
15:00

(BP) Broadstreet	21 – 26	Taunton Titans (BP)
	Report

The Ivor Preece Field
Attendance: 302
Referee: Matthew Riley

28 April 2018
15:00

(BP) Chinnor	52 – 14	Clifton
	Report

Kingsey Road
Attendance: 285
Referee: Shane Lewis

28 April 2018
15:00

(BP) Cinderford	34 – 12	Canterbury
	Report

Dockham Road
Attendance: 449
Referee: Benjamin Wilde

28 April 2018
15:00

(BP) London Irish Wild Geese	19 – 26	Worthing Raiders (BP)
	Report

Hazelwood
Attendance: 308
Referee: Adam Wookey

28 April 2018
15:00

(BP) Old Redcliffians	34 – 12	Redruth

Scotland Lane
Attendance: 284
Referee: Nick Wood

28 April 2018
15:00

(BP) Redingensians Rams	51 – 0	Henley Hawks
	Report

Old Bath Road
Attendance: 589
Referee: Luke Davies

28 April 2018
15:00

(BP) Tonbridge Juddians	38 – 26	Bury St Edmunds (BP)

The Slade
Attendance: 237
Referee: Jack Sutton

== Promotion play-off ==
Each season, the runners-up in the National League 2 North and National League 2 South participate in a play-off for promotion to National League 1. Chinnor were runners up in the 2017–18 National League 2 South, and because they had a better record than the 2017–18 National League 2 North runners up, Sedgley Park, they host the play-off match.

Team	Pld	W	D	L	PF	PA	PD	TB	LB	Pts
Chinnor (P)	30	26	1	3	1010	679	+331	25	0	131
Sedgley Park	30	24	0	6	1111	674	+437	26	4	126

(P) Promoted

5 May 2018
15:00

Chinnor	40 – 31	Sedgley Park
	Report

Kingsey Road
Attendance: 1,378
Referee: Neil Chivers

== Attendances ==
- Does not include promotion play-off.

Club	Home games	Total	Average	Highest	Lowest	% Capacity
Barnstaple	15	8,367	558	850	350	28%
Broadstreet	15	3,718	248	365	127	17%
Bury St Edmunds	15	7,372	491	759	250	16%
Canterbury	15	4,669	311	587	132	21%
Chinnor	15	6,280	419	1,016	109	21%
Cinderford	15	4,343	290	449	154	12%
Clifton	15	2,359	157	393	89	7%
Henley Hawks	15	6,035	402	940	180	13%
London Irish Wild Geese	15	3,263	218	308	99	11%
Old Redcliffians	15	2,542	169	284	95	17%
Redingensians Rams	15	3,998	267	589	168	21%
Redruth	15	11,615	774	920	545	22%
Taunton Titans	15	7,792	519	692	325	26%
Tonbridge Juddians	15	3,708	247	351	122	16%
Wimbledon	15	3,747	250	407	90	25%
Worthing Raiders	15	6,714	448	582	205	30%

== Individual statistics ==
- Note that points scorers includes tries as well as conversions, penalties and drop goals. Appearance figures also include coming on as substitutes (unused substitutes not included). Does not include promotion playoff.

=== Top points scorers ===
Rank	Player	Team	Appearances	Points
1	(Wales) Matthew McLean	Worthing Raiders	29	295
2	(England) Gary Kingdom	Taunton Titans	22	232
3	(New Zealand) Jonny Bentley	Chinnor	27	201
4	(England) James Moffat	Cinderford	23	197
5	(England) George Jackson	Henley Hawks	28	184
6	(England) James Doe	Wimbledon	27	176
7	(England) Fraser Honey	Bury St Edmunds	22	168
8	(England) Alexander Seers	London Irish Wild Geese	26	166
9	(England) Bradley Barnes	Clifton	25	145
10	(England) Richard Kevern	Redruth	20	138

=== Top try scorers ===
Rank	Player	Team	Appearances	Tries
1	(England) George Owen	London Irish Wild Geese	28	27
2	(England) Harry Hone	Cinderford	26	22
3	(Ireland) Dwayne Corcoran	Bury St Edmunds	25	21
3	(Poland) Aron Struminski	Taunton Titans	21	21
4	(England) Callum Roberts	Clifton	30	20
5	(England) Phil Chesters	Chinnor	21	19
5	(England) Matt Lane	Cinderford	28	19
5	(England) Reuben Norville	Cinderford	29	19
6	(England) Reon Joseph	London Irish Wild Geese	18	18
6	(England) Oliver Rice	Taunton Titans	24	18

== Season records ==
=== Team ===
Largest home win — 67 points

81 - 14 Taunton Titans at home to Worthing Raiders on 8 October 2017

Largest away win — 73 points

90 - 17 Cinderford away to Henley Hawks on 16 September 2017

Most points scored — 90

90 - 17 Cinderford away to Henley Hawks on 16 September 2017

Most tries in a match — 14

Cinderford away to Henley Hawks on 16 September 2017

Most conversions in a match — 10

Cinderford away to Henley Hawks on 16 September 2017

Most penalties in a match — 5 (2)

Clifton at home to Canterbury on 11 November 2017
Old Redcliffians at home to Worthing Raiders on 7 April 2018

Most drop goals in a match — 2

Broadstreet away to Wimbledon on 9 December 2017

=== Attendances ===
Highest — 1,016

Chinnor at home to Henley Hawks on 9 September 2017

Lowest — 89

Clifton at home to Bury St Edmunds on 17 March 2018

Highest average attendance — 774

Redruth

Lowest average attendance — 157

Clifton

=== Player ===
Most points in a match — 30

(England) Ollie Rice for Taunton Titans at home to Wimbledon on 13 January 2018

Most tries in a match — 6

(England) Ollie Rice for Taunton Titans at home to Wimbledon on 13 January 2018

Most conversions in a match — 10

(England) James Moffat for Cinderford away to Henley Hawks on 16 September 2017

Most penalties in a match — 5 (2)

(England) Bradley Barnes for Clifton at home to Canterbury on 11 November 2017
(England) Kieran Hill for Old Redcliffians at home to Worthing on 7 April 2018

Most drop goals in a match — 2

(South Africa) Clifford Hodgson for Broadstreet away to Wimbledon on 9 December 2017

== See also ==
- English rugby union system
- Rugby union in England
