= 2017–18 National League 2 North =

Rugby union competition in England

- Countries: England
- Date: 2 September 2017 – May 2018
- Champions: Sale FC (1st title)
- Runners-up: Sedgley Park (not promoted)
- Relegated: Sheffield, Blaydon, Luctonians
- Matches played: 237
- Attendance: 76,227 (average 322 per match)
- Highest attendance: 1,820; Sheffield v Sheffield Tigers; 23 December 2017
- Lowest attendance: 57; Sedgley Park v Otley; 17 March 2018
- Top point scorer: (England) Rickie Aley (South Leicester); 343 points
- Top try scorer: (England) Myles Bean (South Leicester); 27 tries

The 2017–18 National League 2 North is the ninth season (31st overall) of the fourth tier (north) of the English domestic rugby union competitions since the professionalised format of the second division was introduced.

On 21 April 2018 Sheffield became the first side to be relegated after losing heavily to promotion chasing Sedgley Park away from home. This meant that Sheffield would equal the unwanted record set by Morley of being the most demoted side in tier 4 (north) history with what was their third relegation from this level since the leagues started in 1987. The championship took a little longer to decide when on 28 April 2018 Sale FC clinched the title by winning 37-5 away to Leicester Lions, with a (rescheduled) game to spare. Sale FC were deserving winners, although runners up Sedgley Park kept the title race going to the wire thanks to their outstanding bonus points tally of 30 (a divisional record), helping Park to the runners up spot and a place in the promotion playoff game. On the same day the second relegation spot was sealed when Blaydon suffered their second successive relegation, losing a tight game 36-40 at Kingston Park to Hinckley.

Runners up Sedgley Park failed to join Sale FC in the 2018–19 National League 1 after they lost 30-41 away to 2017–18 National League 2 South runners up Chinnor in the promotion play-off game played on 5 May 2018. Due to poor weather causing delays to the end of the season it took till 12 May 2018 to determine the final relegation spot with Luctonians losing 21-22 to champions Sale FC at home in their re-arranged fixture, condemning the Herefordshire side to the drop, 3 points below 13th placed Wharfedale, who could have gone down instead had Luctonians won via a bonus point.

== Structure ==
The league consists of sixteen teams with all the teams playing each other on a home and away basis to make a total of thirty matches each. There is one automatic promotion place, one play-off place and three relegation places. The champions are promoted to the 2018–19 National League 1 and the runners up play the second-placed team in the 2017–18 National League 2 South with the winner also being promoted. The last three teams are relegated to either North Premier or Midlands Premier depending on the geographical location of the team (in some cases teams may join the southern regional leagues).

The results of the matches contribute points to the league as follows:

- 4 points are awarded for a win
- 2 points are awarded for a draw
- 0 points are awarded for a loss, however
- 1 losing (bonus) point is awarded to a team that loses a match by 7 points or fewer
- 1 additional (bonus) point is awarded to a team scoring 4 tries or more in a match.

== Participating teams and locations ==
Locations of the 2017–18 National League 2 North teams

Eleven of the teams listed below participated in the 2016–17 National League 2 North season. The 2016–17 champions, Caldy, were promoted into the 2017–18 National League 1, replacing Blaydon and Macclesfield who were relegated from the 2016–17 National League 1. The three teams relegated last season were Preston Grasshoppers and Harrogate (both to North Premier) and Scunthorpe (Midlands Premier).

The promoted teams are Huddersfield, who were promoted as champions of National League 3 North (now North Premier) and Sheffield (play-offs) who came up from National League 3 Midlands (now Midlands Premier). Broadstreet (champions of National League 3 Midlands) would have usually have come into this division but due to an imbalance of teams they were instead level transferred to the 2017–18 National League 2 South as they were considered the most southerly team in the division.

Team	Ground	Capacity	City/Area	Previous season
Blaydon	Crow Trees (Note: Blaydon would also play 3 home games at the 10,200 capacity Kingston Park in Newcastle-upon-Tyne towards the end of the league campaign. This was to give the pitch at the club's regular ground at Crow Trees extended recovery time for next season.)	2,000 (400 seats)	Swalwell, Tyne and Wear	Relegated from National League 1 (15th)
Chester	Hare Lane	2,000 (500 seats)	Chester, Cheshire	5th
Hinckley	Leicester Road	2,000	Hinckley, Leicestershire	9th
Huddersfield	Lockwood Park	1,500 (500 seats)	Huddersfield, West Yorkshire	Promoted from National League 3 North (champions)
Leicester Lions	Westleigh Park	2,000	Blaby, Leicestershire	3rd
Luctonians	Mortimer Park	2,500 (300 seats)	Kingsland, Herefordshire	12th
Macclesfield	Priory Park	1,250 (250 seats)	Macclesfield, Cheshire	Relegated from National League 1 (16th)
Otley	Cross Green	7,000 (852 seats)	Otley, Leeds, West Yorkshire	9th
Sale FC	Heywood Road	3,387	Sale, Greater Manchester	2nd (lost playoff)
Sedgley Park	Park Lane	3,000	Whitefield, Bury, Greater Manchester	4th
Sheffield	Abbeydale Park	3,300 (100 seats)	Sheffield, South Yorkshire	Promoted from National League 3 Midlands (playoffs)
Sheffield Tigers	Dore Moor	1,000	Sheffield, South Yorkshire	13th
South Leicester	Welford Road Ground		Leicester, Leicestershire	7th
Stourbridge	Stourton Park	3,500 (499 seats)	Stourbridge, West Midlands	8th
Tynedale	Tynedale Park	2,000 (400 seats)	Corbridge, Northumberland	6th
Wharfedale	The Avenue	2,000	Threshfield, North Yorkshire	10th

== League table ==
2017–18 National League 2 North table
Pos	Team	Pld	W	D	L	PF	PA	PD	TB	LB	Pts	Qualification
1	Sale FC (C)	30	27	1	2	1010	356	+654	20	1	131	Promoted
2	Sedgley Park	30	24	0	6	1111	674	+437	26	4	126	Promotion play-off
3	Stourbridge	30	20	1	9	909	723	+186	23	2	107	
4	Tynedale (Note: Tynedale would only play 29 games as their rescheduled game away at Sheffield was cancelled as the result would not adversely affect the final league standings.)	29	20	0	9	997	658	+339	21	6	107	
5	Hinckley (Note: Hinckley would only play 29 games as their rescheduled game away at Macclesfield was cancelled as the result would not adversely affect the final league standings.)	29	20	0	9	877	553	+324	20	5	105	
6	Huddersfield	30	15	1	14	732	758	−26	12	3	77	
7	Chester (Note: Chester would only play 29 games as their rescheduled game at home to South Leicester was cancelled as the result would not adversely affect the final league standings.)	29	15	0	14	599	646	−47	10	3	73	
8	Macclesfield (Note: Macclesfield would only play 29 games as their rescheduled game at home to Hinckley was cancelled as the result would not adversely affect the final league standings.)	29	13	0	16	663	711	−48	12	4	68	
9	South Leicester (Note: South Leicester would only play 29 games as their rescheduled game away at Chester was cancelled as the result would not adversely affect the final league standings.)	29	12	3	14	744	834	−90	9	5	68	
10	Sheffield Tigers	30	11	0	19	622	942	−320	9	6	59	
11	Otley	30	11	1	18	615	838	−223	8	4	58	
12	Leicester Lions	30	10	1	19	557	720	−163	10	6	58	
13	Wharfedale	30	11	0	19	631	755	−124	7	5	56	
14	Luctonians (R)	30	9	0	21	640	829	−189	8	9	53	Relegated
15	Blaydon (R)	30	8	0	22	684	1019	−335	16	5	53	Relegated
16	Sheffield (Note: Sheffield would only play 29 games as their rescheduled game at home to Tynedale was cancelled as the result would not adversely affect the final league standings.) (R)	29	7	0	22	465	840	−375	2	7	37	Relegated

Updated to match(es) played on 12 May 2018. Source: "National League 2 North". NCA Rugby.
Rules for classification: If teams are level at any stage, tiebreakers are applied in the following order:
1. Number of matches won
2. Difference between points for and against
3. Total number of points for
4. Aggregate number of points scored in matches between tied teams
5. Number of matches won excluding the first match, then the second and so on until the tie is settled
  (C) Champion; (R) Relegated
  Notes:

== Results ==
=== Round 1 ===
2 September 2017
14:00

Otley	21 – 42	Stourbridge (BP)
	Report

Cross Green
Attendance: 369
Referee: Jonathan Cook

2 September 2017
15:00

(BP) Hinckley	52 – 26	Blaydon (BP)
	Report

Leicester Road
Attendance: 512
Referee: Benjamin Davis

2 September 2017
15:00

(BP) Macclesfield	41 – 15	Wharfedale
	Report

Priory Park
Attendance: 527
Referee: Harry Wallbaume

2 September 2017
15:00

(BP) Sale FC	48 – 10	Leicester Lions
	Report

Heywood Road
Attendance: 403
Referee: Llyr ApGeraint-Roberts

2 September 2017
15:00

(2BP) Sheffield	31 – 32	Luctonians (BP)
	Report

Abbeydale Park
Attendance: 250
Referee: Ieuan Davies

2 September 2017
15:00

Sheffield Tigers	5 – 38	Sedgley Park (BP)
	Report

Dore More
Attendance: 158
Referee: Jamie Leahy

2 September 2017
15:00

(BP) South Leicester	44 – 36	Huddersfield (BP)
	Report

Welford Road Ground
Attendance: 110
Referee: Ben Rayner

2 September 2017
15:00

(BP) Tynedale	52 – 21	Chester
	Report

Tynedale Park
Attendance: 560
Referee: James O'Brien

=== Round 2 ===
9 September 2017
14:00

Leicester Lions	18 – 31	South Leicester
	Report

Westleigh Park
Attendance: 120
Referee: Luke Davies

9 September 2017
14:30

Blaydon	12 – 33	Tynedale (BP)
	Report

Crow Trees
Attendance: 650
Referee: Luke Haskins

9 September 2017
14:30

Sedgley Park	24 – 16	Sale FC
	Report

Park Lane
Attendance: 300
Referee: Ieuan Davies

9 September 2017
15:00

Chester	25 – 22	Macclesfield (BP)
	Report

Hare Lane
Attendance: 364
Referee: Chris Bennett

9 September 2017
15:00

Huddersfield	3 – 24	Hinckley
	Report

Lockwood Park
Attendance: 212
Referee: Jonathan Cook

9 September 2017
15:00

Sheffield Tigers	22 – 18	Sheffield (BP)
	Report

Dore Moor
Attendance: 724 (Note: Attendances vary according to sources. The Rugby Paper had the attendance as 724 for the Sheffield v Sheffield Tigers on 23 December 2017 while NCA/Rugby Statbunker gave a figure of 485. However, given that this was a derby game that would get over 1,800 in the return fixture later that December, the higher figure seems more realistic.)
Referee: Harry Walbaum

9 September 2017
15:00

(BP) Stourbridge	30 – 25	Luctonians (BP)
	Report

Stourton Park
Attendance: 400
Referee: George Selwood

9 September 2017
15:00

(BP) Wharfedale	14 – 17	Otley
	Report

The Avenue
Attendance: 592
Referee: Callum Sharp

=== Round 3 ===
16 September 2017
14:00

(BP) Otley	31 – 16	Chester
	Report

Cross Green
Attendance: 349
Referee: Ben Rayner

16 September 2017
15:00

(BP) Hinckley	37 – 34	Leicester Lions (2BP)
	Report

Leicester Road
Attendance: 400
Referee: Richard Haughton

16 September 2017
15:00

Luctonians	26 – 14	Wharfedale
	Report

Mortimer Park
Attendance: 296
Referee: Ben Davis

16 September 2017
15:00

(BP) Macclesfield	41 – 15	Blaydon
	Report

Priory Park
Attendance: 282
Referee: Jonathan Cook

16 September 2017
15:00

(BP) Sale FC	52 – 15	Sheffield Tigers
	Report

Heywood Road
Attendance: 337
Referee: Callum Sharp

16 September 2017
15:00

Sheffield	17 – 38	Stourbridge (BP)
	Report

Abbeydale Park
Attendance: 198
Referee: Luke Davies

16 September 2017
15:00

(BP) South Leicester	47 – 37	Sedgley Park (BP)
	Report

Welford Road Ground
Attendance: 103
Referee: Michael Harris

16 September 2017
15:00

(BP) Tynedale	26 – 25	Huddersfield (BP)
	Report

Tynedale Park
Attendance: 470
Referee: Chris Bennett

=== Round 4 ===
23 September 2017
14:00

(2BP) Leicester Lions	26 – 28	Tynedale
	Report

Westleigh Park
Attendance: 80
Referee: Robert Bourke

23 September 2017
14:30

(BP) Blaydon	35 – 24	Otley (BP)
	Report

Crow Trees
Attendance: 320
Referee: Llyr ApGeraint-Roberts

23 September 2017
14:30

(BP) Sedgley Park	49 – 29	Hinckley (BP)
	Report

Park Lane
Attendance: 150
Referee: Callum Sharp

23 September 2017
15:00

(BP) Chester	31 – 15	Luctonians
	Report

Hare Lane
Attendance: 364
Referee: Daniel Woods

23 September 2017
15:00

Huddersfield	22 – 13	Macclesfield
	Report

Lockwood Park
Attendance: 200
Referee: Ieuan Davies

23 September 2017
15:00

(BP) Sale FC	31 – 17	Sheffield
	Report

Heywood Road
Attendance: 279
Referee: Harry Walbaum

23 September 2017
15:00

Sheffield Tigers	29 – 22	South Leicester (BP)
	Report

Dore Moor
Attendance: 163
Referee: Jack Sutton

23 September 2017
15:00

Wharfedale	10 – 45	Stourbridge (BP)
	Report

The Avenue
Attendance: 380
Referee: Jonathan Cook

=== Round 5 ===
30 September 2017
14:00

Otley	20 – 20	Huddersfield
	Report

Cross Green
Attendance: 396
Referee: James O'Brien

30 September 2017
15:00

(BP) Hinckley	56 – 7	Sheffield Tigers
	Report

Leicester Road
Attendance: 380
Referee: Matthew Astle

30 September 2017
15:00

Luctonians	17 – 7	Blaydon
	Report

Mortimer Park
Attendance: 287
Referee: Jack Sutton

30 September 2017
15:00

Macclesfield	12 – 25	Leicester Lions (BP)
	Report

Priory Park
Attendance: 218
Referee: Ben Rayner

30 September 2017
15:00

(BP) Sheffield	10 – 17	Wharfedale
	Report

Abbeydale Park
Attendance: 300
Referee: Matt Turvey

30 September 2017
15:00

South Leicester	22 – 22	Sale FC (BP)
	Report

Welford Road Ground
Attendance: 100
Referee: Adam Wookey

30 September 2017
15:00

(BP) Stourbridge	36 – 12	Chester
	Report

Stourton Park
Attendance: 300
Referee: Callum Sharp

30 September 2017
15:00

(BP) Tynedale	46 – 24	Sedgley Park (BP)
	Report

Tynedale Park
Attendance: 580
Referee: Neil Chivers

=== Round 6 ===
7 October 2017
14:00

(BP) Leicester Lions	38 – 13	Otley
	Report

Westleigh Park
Attendance: 120
Referee: Alexis Manley

7 October 2017
14:30

Blaydon	11 – 40	Stourbridge (BP)
	Report

Crow Trees
Attendance: 185
Referee: Benjamin Davis

7 October 2017
14:30

(BP) Sedgley Park	35 – 15	Macclesfield
	Report

Park Lane
Attendance: 350
Referee: Harry Walbaum

7 October 2017
15:00

Chester	10 – 3	Wharfedale (BP)
	Report

Hare Lane
Attendance: 389
Referee: Lylr ApGeraint-Roberts

7 October 2017
15:00

(BP) Huddersfield	32 – 15	Luctonians
	Report

Lockwood Park
Attendance: 317
Referee: Jamie Leahy

7 October 2017
15:00

Sale FC	21 – 6	Hinckley
	Report

Heywood Road
Attendance: 243
Referee: Mick Harris

7 October 2017
15:00

Sheffield Tigers	10 – 29	Tynedale (BP)
	Report

Dore Moor
Attendance: 148
Referee: James O'Brien

7 October 2017
15:00

(BP) South Leicester	35 – 26	Sheffield (BP)
	Report

Welford Road Ground
Attendance: 100
Referee: Ieuan Davies

=== Round 7 ===
14 October 2017
14:00

(BP) Otley	46 – 57	Sedgley Park (BP)
	Report

Cross Green
Attendance: 429
Referee: Callum Sharp

14 October 2017
15:00

(BP) Hinckley	36 – 32	South Leicester (BP)
	Report

Leicester Road
Attendance: 255
Referee: James O'Brien

14 October 2017
15:00

Luctonians	3 – 40	Leicester Lions (BP)
	Report

Mortimer Park
Attendance: 447
Referee: Shane Lewis

14 October 2017
15:00

(BP) Macclesfield	45 – 55	Sheffield Tigers (BP)
	Report

Priory Park
Attendance: 251
Referee: Mick Harris

14 October 2017
15:00

Sheffield	14 – 24	Chester
	Report

Abbeydale Park
Attendance: 250
Referee: Claire Hodnett

14 October 2017
15:00

(BP) Stourbridge	32 – 17	Huddersfield
	Report

Stourton Park
Attendance: 375
Referee: Harry Walbaum

14 October 2017
15:00

Tynedale	7 – 5	Sale FC (BP)
	Report

Tynedale Park
Attendance: 540
Referee: Benjamin Davis

14 October 2017
15:00

Wharfedale	19 – 27	Blaydon
	Report

The Avenue
Attendance: 425
Referee: Callum Sharp

=== Round 8 ===
21 October 2017
14:00

Leicester Lions	13 – 27	Stourbridge (BP)
	Report

Westleigh Park
Attendance: 128
Referee: Charlie Jeavons-Fellows

21 October 2017
14:30

(BP) Blaydon	29 – 14	Chester
	Report

Crow Trees
Attendance: 220
Referee: Michael Harris

21 October 2017
14:30

(BP) Sedgley Park	31 – 13	Luctonians
	Report

Park Lane
Attendance: 200
Referee: Ieuan Davies

21 October 2017
15:00

(BP) Hinckley	36 – 22	Sheffield
	Report

Leicester Road
Attendance: 235
Referee: Charles Gayther

21 October 2017
15:00

(BP) Huddersfield	43 – 27	Wharfedale (BP)
	Report

Lockwood Park
Attendance: 341
Referee: Ben Davies

21 October 2017
15:00

Sale FC	19 – 3	Macclesfield
	Report

Heywood Road
Attendance: 390
Referee: Matt Turvey

21 October 2017
15:00

(BP) Sheffield Tigers	35 – 21	Otley
	Report

Dore Moor
Attendance: 143
Referee: Jack Sutton

21 October 2017
15:00

South Leicester	25 – 17	Tynedale
	Report

Welford Road Ground
Attendance: 100
Referee: Chris Bennett

=== Round 9 ===
28 October 2017
14:00

Otley	13 – 31	Sale FC (BP)
	Report

Cross Green
Attendance: 326
Referee: Llyr ApGeraint-Roberts

28 October 2017
15:00

(BP) Chester	34 – 20	Huddersfield
	Report

Hare Lane
Attendance: 378
Referee: Ieuan Davies

28 October 2017
15:00

(BP) Luctonians	33 – 46	Sheffield Tigers (BP)
	Report

Mortimer Park
Attendance: 381
Referee: Benjamin Russell

28 October 2017
15:00

Macclesfield	18 – 9	South Leicester
	Report

Priory Park
Attendance: 210
Referee: George Selwood

28 October 2017
15:00

Sheffield	20 – 14	Blaydon (BP)
	Report

Abbeydale Park
Attendance: 150
Referee: Tim Allatt

28 October 2017
15:00

(BP) Stourbridge	33 – 31	Sedgley Park (2BP)
	Report

Stourton Park
Attendance: 350
Referee: Richard Haughton

28 October 2017
15:00

(BP) Tynedale	18 – 20	Hinckley
	Report

Tynedale Park
Attendance: 560
Referee: Matthew Turvey

28 October 2017
15:00

Wharfedale	10 – 24	Leicester Lions (BP)
	Report

The Avenue
Attendance: 376
Referee: Gareth Holsgrove

=== Round 10 ===
4 November 2017
14:00

(BP) Leicester Lions	35 – 14	Chester
	Report

Westleigh Park
Attendance: 117
Referee: George Selwood

4 November 2017
14:00

Sheffield Tigers	20 – 14	Stourbridge (BP)
	Report

Dore Moor
Attendance: 175
Referee: Chris Bennett

4 November 2017
14:00

(BP) Tynedale	47 – 11	Sheffield
	Report

Tynedale Park
Attendance: 420
Referee: Michael Harris

4 November 2017
14:15

(BP) Sale FC	48 – 5	Luctonians
	Report

Heywood Road
Attendance: 419
Referee: Ieuan Davies

4 November 2017
14:15

(BP) South Leicester	44 – 34	Otley (BP)
	Report

Welford Road Ground
Attendance: 199
Referee: Jack Lewars

4 November 2017
14:30

(BP) Sedgley Park	43 – 30	Wharfedale
	Report

Park Lane
Attendance: 300
Referee: Llyr ApGeraint-Roberts

4 November 2017
15:00

(BP) Hinckley	42 – 7	Macclesfield
	Report

Leicester Road
Attendance: 605
Referee: Callum Sharp

4 November 2017
15:00

(BP) Huddersfield	48 – 22	Blaydon (BP)
	Report

Lockwood Park
Attendance: 350
Referee: Ben Rayner

=== Round 11 ===
11 November 2017
14:00

(BP) Blaydon	13 – 17	Leicester Lions
	Report

Crow Trees
Attendance: 220
Referee: Harry Walbaum

11 November 2017
14:00

Otley	15 – 38	Hinckley (BP)
	Report

Cross Green
Attendance: 245
Referee: Dave Charlton

11 November 2017
14:00

(BP) Wharfedale	33 – 53	Sheffield Tigers (BP)
	Report

The Avenue
Attendance: 418
Referee: Daniel Woods

11 November 2017
14:15

(2BP) Luctonians	25 – 28	South Leicester
	Report

Mortimer Park
Attendance: 302
Referee: Ieuan Davies

11 November 2017
14:15

Sheffield	16 – 31	Huddersfield
	Report

Abbeydale Park
Attendance: 150
Referee: Matthew Astle

11 November 2017
15:00

Chester	7 – 31	Sedgley Park (BP)
	Report

Hare Lane
Attendance: 329
Referee: Ben Rayner

11 November 2017
15:00

(2BP) Macclesfield	35 – 38	Tynedale (BP)
	Report

Priory Park
Attendance: 198
Referee: Chris Bennett

11 November 2017
15:00

Stourbridge	16 – 39	Sale FC (BP)
	Report

Stourton Park
Attendance: 450
Referee: Callum Sharpe

=== Round 12 ===
25 November 2017
14:00

Leicester Lions	17 – 31	Huddersfield
	Report

Westleigh Park
Attendance: 117
Referee: Timothy Allat

25 November 2017
14:00

(BP) Sheffield Tigers	10 – 13	Chester
	Report

Dore Moor
Attendance: 131
Referee: Ben Davis

25 November 2017
14:00

(BP) Tynedale	69 – 10	Otley
	Report

Tynedale Park
Attendance: 480
Referee: Jamie Leahy

25 November 2017
14:15

(BP) Sale FC	48 – 16	Wharfedale
	Report

Heywood Road
Attendance: 250
Referee: David Charlton

25 November 2017
14:15

South Leicester	26 – 26	Stourbridge (BP)
	Report

Welford Road Ground
Attendance: 100
Referee: Ben Rayner

25 November 2017
14:30

(BP) Sedgley Park	48 – 26	Blaydon (BP)
	Report

Park Lane
Attendance: 300
Referee: James O'Brien

25 November 2017
15:00

(BP) Hinckley	52 – 12	Luctonians
	Report

Leicester Road
Attendance: 490
Referee: George Selwood

25 November 2017
15:00

Macclesfield	P – P	Sheffield

Priory Park

- Postponed due to bad weather. Game rescheduled for 24 February 2018.

=== Round 13 ===
2 December 2017
15:00

(BP) Blaydon	36 – 34	Sheffield Tigers (2BP)
	Report

Crow Trees
Attendance: 195
Referee: Callum Sharp

2 December 2017
15:00

Otley	23 – 17	Macclesfield (BP)
	Report

Cross Green
Attendance: 247
Referee: Benjamin Davis

2 December 2017
14:00

Wharfedale	28 – 25	South Leicester (BP)
	Report

The Avenue
Attendance: 372
Referee: Chris Bennett

2 December 2017
14:15

(2BP) Luctonians	38 – 40	Tynedale (BP)
	Report

Mortimer Park
Attendance: 312
Referee: Tim Allatt

2 December 2017
14:15

Sheffield	14 – 7	Leicester Lions (BP)
	Report

Abbeydale Park
Attendance: 150
Referee: Ben Rayner

2 December 2017
15:00

Chester	10 – 40	Sale FC (BP)
	Report

Hare Lane
Attendance: 322
Referee: James O'Brien

2 December 2017
15:00

Huddersfield	32 – 30	Sedgley Park (2BP)
	Report

Lockwood Park
Attendance: 350
Referee: Steve Gammage

2 December 2017
15:00

Stourbridge	0 – 35	Hinckley (BP)
	Report

Stourton Park
Attendance: 475
Referee: Phil Davis

=== Round 14 ===
9 December 2017
14:00

Otley	5 – 20	Sheffield
	Report

Cross Green
Attendance: 198
Referee: Matthew Astle

9 December 2017
14:00

(2BP) Sheffield Tigers	33 – 36	Huddersfield (BP)
	Report

Dore Moor
Attendance: 142
Referee: George Selwood

9 December 2017
14:00

Tynedale	P – P	Stourbridge

Tynedale Park

- Postponed due to bad weather (snow). Game rescheduled to 24 February 2018.

9 December 2017
14:15

(BP) Sale FC	54 – 12	Blaydon
	Report

Heywood Road
Attendance: 213
Referee: Daniel Woods

9 December 2017
14:15

South Leicester	21 – 20	Chester (BP)
	Report

Welford Road Ground
Attendance: 100
Referee: Jack Sutton

9 December 2017
14:30

Sedgley Park	P – P	Leicester Lions

Park Lane

- Postponed due to bad weather (snow). Game rescheduled to 24 February 2018.

9 December 2017
15:00

(BP) Hinckley	20 – 17	Wharfedale (BP)
	Report

Leicester Road
Attendance: 520
Referee: Adam Wookey

9 December 2017
15:00

Macclesfield	P – P	Luctonians

Priory Park

- Postponed due to bad weather (snow). Game rescheduled to 17 March 2018.

=== Round 15 ===
16 December 2017
14:00

Blaydon	P – P	South Leicester

Crow Trees

- Postponed due to unplayable pitch caused by recent bad weather. Game rescheduled to 24 February 2018.

16 December 2017
14:00

Leicester Lions	11 – 5	Sheffield Tigers (BP)
	Report

Westleigh Park
Attendance: 120
Referee: Ieuan Davies

16 December 2017
14:00

Wharfedale	P – P	Tynedale

The Avenue

- Postponed due to unplayable pitch caused by bad weather. Game rescheduled to 17 March 2018.

16 December 2017
14:15

(BP) Luctonians	18 – 23	Otley
	Report

Mortimer Park
Attendance: 268
Referee: Jack Sutton

16 December 2017
14:15

Sheffield	0 – 31	Sedgley Park (BP)
	Report

Abbeydale Park
Attendance: 100
Referee: George Selwood

16 December 2017
15:00

Chester	12 – 8	Hinckley (BP)
	Report

Hare Lane
Attendance: 384
Referee: Daniel Woods

16 December 2017
15:00

Huddersfield	P – P	Sale FC

Lockwood Park

- Postponed due to frozen pitch caused by bad weather. Game rescheduled to 24 February 2018.

16 December 2017
15:00

(BP) Stourbridge	39 – 25	Macclesfield (BP)
	Report

Stourton Park
Attendance: 324
Referee: Shane Lewis

=== Round 16 ===
23 December 2017
14:00

Otley	20 – 13	Wharfedale (BP)
	Report

Cross Green
Attendance: 1,106
Referee: Harry Walbaum

23 December 2017
14:00

(BP) Tynedale	32 – 31	Blaydon (2BP)
	Report

Tynedale Park
Attendance: 850
Referee: Callum Sharp

23 December 2017
14:15

(2BP) Luctonians	36 – 39	Stourbridge (BP)
	Report

Mortimer Park
Attendance: 461
Referee: Charles Gayther

23 December 2017
14:15

Sale FC	20 – 13	Sedgley Park (BP)
	Report

Heywood Road
Attendance: 1,500 (Note: Attendances vary depending on sources for the game between Sale FC and Sedgley Park on 23 December 2017. The NCA gave a figure of 307, the Rugby Paper a figure of 546, and Sale FC a figure of 1,500. Confusion may have arisen as Sale FC do not charge for under-16's (they had 150 minis as mascots at the game) so the Rugby Paper figure may have only included money taken from the gate, while the NCA figure remains a mystery.)
Referee: Benjamin Davies

23 December 2017
14:15

Sheffield	25 – 21	Sheffield Tigers (BP)
	Report

Abbeydale Park
Attendance: 1,820 (Note: Attendances vary according to sources. The Rugby Paper had the attendance as 496 for the Sheffield v Sheffield Tigers on 23 December 2017 while NCA/Rugby Statbunker gave a figure of 320. However from talking to the chairman of Sheffield RUFC it turns out the actual attendance was 1,820.)
Referee: Chris Bennett

23 December 2017
14:15

South Leicester	25 – 25	Leicester Lions
	Report

Welford Road Ground
Attendance: 150
Referee: Daniel Woods

23 December 2017
15:00

(BP) Hinckley	41 – 18	Huddersfield
	Report

Leicester Road
Attendance: 640
Referee: James O'Brien

23 December 2017
15:00

(BP) Macclesfield	24 – 14	Chester
	Report

Priory Park
Attendance: 372
Referee: Matt Turvey

=== Round 17 ===
6 January 2018
14:00

(BP) Blaydon	34 – 52	Macclesfield (BP)
	Report

Crow Trees
Attendance: 145
Referee: Chris Bennett

6 January 2018
14:00

Leicester Lions	0 – 27	Hinckley (BP)
	Report

Westleigh Park
Attendance: 170
Referee: Andrew MacNeaney

6 January 2018
14:00

Sheffield Tigers	16 – 27	Sale FC (BP)
	Report

Dore Moor
Attendance: 149
Referee: Jack Sutton

6 January 2018
14:00

(BP) Wharfedale	34 – 15	Luctonians
	Report

The Avenue
Attendance: 357
Referee: Callum Sharp

6 January 2018
14:30

(BP) Sedgley Park	26 – 21	South Leicester (BP)
	Report

Park Lane
Attendance: 212
Referee: Daniel Woods

6 January 2018
15:00

Chester	22 – 19	Otley (BP)
	Report

Hare Lane
Attendance: 328
Referee: James O'Brien

6 January 2018
15:00

(BP) Huddersfield	29 – 20	Tynedale
	Report

Lockwood Park
Attendance: 316
Referee: Ben Raynor

6 January 2018
15:00

(BP) Stourbridge	41 – 17	Sheffield
	Report

Stourton Park
Attendance: 324
Referee: Ben Davies

=== Round 18 ===
13 January 2018
14:00

(BP) Otley	40 – 17	Blaydon
	Report

Cross Green
Attendance: 289
Referee: Ieuan Davies

13 January 2018
14:00

(BP) Tynedale	39 – 10	Leicester Lions
	Report

Tynedale Park
Attendance: 300
Referee: Ben Davis

13 January 2018
14:15

Luctonians	20 – 5	Chester
	Report

Mortimer Park
Attendance: 317
Referee: Shane Lewis

13 January 2018
14:15

Sheffield	10 – 47	Sale FC (BP)
	Report

Abbeydale Park
Attendance: 150
Referee: Michael Harris

13 January 2018
14:15

South Leicester	22 – 16	Sheffield Tigers (BP)
	Report

Welford Road Ground
Attendance: 75
Referee: Matthew Astle

13 January 2018
15:00

(BP) Hinckley	23 – 26	Sedgley Park (BP)
	Report

Leicester Road
Attendance: 525
Referee: Andrew Wigley

13 January 2018
15:00

Macclesfield	20 – 15	Huddersfield (BP)
	Report

Priory Park
Attendance: 372
Referee: Timothy Allatt

13 January 2018
15:00

(BP) Stourbridge	29 – 19	Wharfedale
	Report

Stourton Park
Attendance: 400
Referee: Chris Bennett

=== Round 19 ===
20 January 2018
14:00

Blaydon	P – P	Luctonians

Crow Trees

- Postponed due to snow. Game rescheduled for 31 March 2018.

20 January 2018
14:00

(BP) Leicester Lions	7 – 14	Macclesfield
	Report

Westleigh Park
Attendance: 108
Referee: Jack Lewars

20 January 2018
14:00

Sheffield Tigers	5 – 36	Hinckley (BP)
	Report

Dore Moor
Attendance: 121
Referee: Ben Rayner

20 January 2018
14:00

Wharfedale	16 – 10	Sheffield (BP)
	Report

The Avenue
Attendance: 379
Referee: James O'Brien

20 January 2018
14:15

(BP) Sale FC	39 – 7	South Leicester
	Report

Heywood Road
Attendance: 300
Referee: George Selwood

20 January 2018
14:30

Sedgley Park	23 – 22	Tynedale (2BP)
	Report

Park Lane
Attendance: 250
Referee: Callum Sharp

20 January 2018
15:00

Chester (BP)	24 – 12	Stourbridge
	Report

Hare Lane
Attendance: 376
Referee: Matthew Riley

20 January 2018
15:00

Huddersfield	18 – 22	Otley
	Report

Lockwood Park
Attendance: 408
Referee: Daniel Woods

=== Round 20 ===
27 January 2018
14:00

(BP) Otley	20 – 25	Leicester Lions (BP)
	Report

Cross Green
Attendance: 309
Referee: Chris Bennett

27 January 2018
14:00

(BP) Tynedale	71 – 20	Sheffield Tigers
	Report

Tynedale Park
Attendance: 360
Referee: Ross Mabon

27 January 2018
14:00

Wharfedale	22 – 20	Chester (BP)
	Report

The Avenue
Attendance: 433
Referee: Michael Harris

27 January 2018
14:15

Luctonians	18 – 30	Huddersfield (BP)
	Report

Mortimer Park
Attendance: 307
Referee: Tim Allat

27 January 2018
14:15

Sheffield	10 – 3	South Leicester (BP)
	Report

Abbeydale Park
Attendance: 120
Referee: Ben Rayner

27 January 2018
15:00

Hinckley	18 – 26	Sale FC
	Report

Leicester Road
Attendance: 789
Referee: Alexander Thomas

27 January 2018
15:00

Macclesfield	18 – 28	Sedgley Park (BP)
	Report

Priory Park
Attendance: 320
Referee: Matt Turvey

27 January 2018
15:00

(BP) Stourbridge	89 – 17	Blaydon
	Report

Stourton Park
Attendance: 375
Referee: Harry Walbaum

=== Round 21 ===
3 February 2018
14:00

Blaydon	14 – 30	Wharfedale
	Report

Crow Trees
Attendance: 320
Referee: Benjamin Davis

3 February 2018
14:00

Leicester Lions	P – P	Luctonians

Westleigh Park

- Postponed due to unplayable pitch caused by heavy rain. Game to be rescheduled for 5 May 2018.

3 February 2018
14:00

Sheffield Tigers	10 – 0	Macclesfield
	Report

Dore Moor
Attendance: 81
Referee: Llyr ApGeraint-Roberts

3 February 2018
14:15

(BP) Sale FC	34 – 10	Tynedale
	Report

Heywood Road
Attendance: 423
Referee: Nicholas Wood

3 February 2018
14:15

South Leicester	15 – 34	Hinckley (BP)
	Report

Welford Road Ground
Attendance: 120
Referee: Timothy Allatt

3 February 2018
14:30

Sedgley Park	P – P	Otley

Park Lane

- Game postponed due to unplayable pitch caused by rain. Game to be rescheduled for 17 March 2018.

3 February 2018
15:00

(BP) Chester	24 – 5	Sheffield
	Report

Hare Lane
Attendance: 324
Referee: Chris Bennett

3 February 2018
15:00

Huddersfield	13 – 26	Stourbridge (BP)
	Report

Lockwood Park
Attendance: 248
Referee: Andrew Wigley

=== Round 22 ===
10 February 2018
14:00

(BP) Otley	28 – 17	Sheffield Tigers
	Report

Cross Green
Attendance: 248
Referee: Owen Taylor

10 February 2018
14:00

(BP) Tynedale	52 – 33	South Leicester (BP)
	Report

Tynedale Park
Attendance: 380
Referee: Chris Bennett

10 February 2018
14:00

(BP) Wharfedale	43 – 5	Huddersfield
	Report

The Avenue
Attendance: 372
Referee: Ben Rayner

10 February 2018
14:15

(BP) Luctonians	17 – 22	Sedgley Park
	Report

Mortimer Park
Attendance: 288
Referee: Timothy Allatt

10 February 2018
14:15

Sheffield	14 – 8	Hinckley (BP)
	Report

Abbeydale Park
Attendance: 300
Referee: Michael Harris

10 February 2018
15:00

(BP) Chester	29 – 7	Blaydon
	Report

Hare Lane
Attendance: 376
Referee: Callum Sharp

10 February 2018
15:00

Macclesfield	P – P	Sale FC

Priory Park

- Postponed due to semi-frozen and waterlogged pitch caused by bad weather (rain and snow). Game to be rescheduled for 31 March 2018.

10 February 2018
15:00

Stourbridge	23 – 12	Leicester Lions
	Report

Stourton Park
Attendance: 300
Referee: Ben Davis

=== Round 23 ===
17 February 2018
14:00

(BP) Blaydon	29 – 23	Sheffield (BP)
	Report

Crow Trees
Attendance: 179
Referee: Daniel Woods

17 February 2018
14:00

(BP) Leicester Lions	37 – 28	Wharfedale (BP)
	Report

Westleigh Park
Attendance: 147
Referee: Alex Manley

17 February 2018
14:00

(BP) Sheffield Tigers	25 – 20	Luctonians (BP)
	Report

Dore Moor
Attendance: 137
Referee: James O'Brien

17 February 2018
14:15

(BP) Sale FC	59 – 5	Otley
	Report

Heywood Road
Attendance: 287
Referee: Callum Sharp

17 February 2018
14:15

South Leicester	24 – 38	Macclesfield (BP)
	Report

Welford Road Ground
Attendance: 100
Referee: Ben Rayner

17 February 2018
14:30

(BP) Sedgley Park	34 – 41	Stourbridge (BP)
	Report

Park Lane
Attendance: 320
Referee: Chris Bennett

17 February 2018
15:00

(BP) Hinckley	29 – 26	Tynedale (2BP)
	Report

Leicester Road
Attendance: 625
Referee: Robert Bourke

17 February 2018
15:00

Huddersfield	10 – 19	Chester
	Report

Lockwood Park
Attendance: 368
Referee: Michael Harris

=== Rounds 12, 14 & 15 (rescheduled games) ===
24 February 2018
14:00

(BP) Blaydon	45 – 20	South Leicester (BP)
	Report

Crow Trees
Attendance: 247
Referee: Michael Harris

- Game rescheduled from 16 December 2017.

24 February 2018
14:00

(BP) Tynedale	52 – 29	Stourbridge (BP)
	Report

Tynedale Park
Attendance: 300
Referee: Callum Sharp

- Game rescheduled from 9 December 2017.

24 February 2018
14:30

(BP) Sedgley Park	34 – 12	Leicester Lions
	Report

Park Lane
Attendance: 175
Referee: Daniel Woods

- Game rescheduled from 9 December 2017.

24 February 2018
15:00

Huddersfield	7 – 28	Sale FC
	Report

Lockwood Park
Attendance: 150
Referee: Tim Allatt

- Game rescheduled from 16 December 2017.

24 February 2018
15:00

(BP) Macclesfield	31 – 15	Sheffield
	Report

Priory Park
Attendance: 290
Referee: Ben Davis

- Game rescheduled from 25 November 2017.

=== Round 24 ===
3 March 2018
14:00

Otley	P – P	South Leicester

Cross Green

- Postponed due to bad weather (snow). Game to be rescheduled for 31 March 2018.

3 March 2018
14:15

Luctonians	P – P	Sale FC

Mortimer Park

- Postponed due to bad weather (snow). Game to be rescheduled for 12 May 2018.

3 March 2018
14:30

Blaydon	P – P	Huddersfield

Crow Trees

- Postponed due to bad weather (snow). Game to be rescheduled for 17 March 2018.

3 March 2018
15:00

Chester	P – P	Leicester Lions

Hare Lane

- Postponed due to bad weather (snow). Game to be rescheduled for 17 March 2018.

3 March 2018
15:00

Macclesfield	P – P	Hinckley

Priory Park

- Postponed due to bad weather (snow). Game to be rescheduled for 5 May 2018.

3 March 2018
15:00

Sheffield	P – P	Tynedale

Abbeydale Park

- Postponed due to bad weather (snow). Game to be rescheduled for 31 March 2018.

3 March 2018
15:00

Stourbridge	P – P	Sheffield Tigers

Stourton Park

- Postponed due to bad weather (snow). Game to be rescheduled for 17 March 2018.

3 March 2018
15:00

Wharfedale	P – P	Sedgley Park

The Avenue

- Postponed due to bad weather (snow). Game to be rescheduled for 29 March 2018.

=== Round 25 ===
10 March 2018
14:00

Leicester Lions	15 – 8	(BP) Blaydon
	Report

Westleigh Park
Attendance: 112
Referee: Timothy Allatt

10 March 2018
14:00

(BP) Tynedale	35 – 12	Macclesfield
	Report

Tynedale Park
Attendance: 350
Referee: Ieuan Davies

10 March 2018
14:30

(BP) Sedgley Park	45 – 0	Chester
	Report

Park Lane
Attendance: 208
Referee: Jamie Leahy

10 March 2018
15:00

(BP) Hinckley	13 – 15	Otley
	Report

Leicester Road
Attendance: 635
Referee: Llyr ApGeraint Roberts

10 March 2018
15:00

(BP) Huddersfield	44 – 10	Sheffield
	Report

Lockwood Park
Attendance: 341
Referee: Harry Walbaum

10 March 2018
15:00

(BP) Sale FC	29 – 0	Stourbridge
	Report

Heywood Road
Attendance: 390
Referee: Benjamin Davis

10 March 2018
15:00

Sheffield Tigers	0 – 16	Wharfedale
	Report

Dore Moor
Attendance: 124
Referee: Chris Bennett

10 March 2018
15:00

(BP) South Leicester	26 – 20	Luctonians (BP)
	Report

Welford Road Ground
Attendance: 100
Referee: Thomas Davis

=== Rounds 14, 15, 21 & 24 (rescheduled games) ===
17 March 2018
13:00

(2BP) Stourbridge	26 – 28	Sheffield Tigers (BP)
	Report

Stourton Park
Attendance: 250
Referee: Charlie Gayther

- Game rescheduled from 3 March 2018.

17 March 2018
14:00

(BP) Sedgley Park	24 – 21	Otley (BP)
	Report

Park Lane
Attendance: 57
Referee: Timothy Allatt

- Game rescheduled from 3 February 2018.

17 March 2018
14:30

Blaydon	15 – 26	Huddersfield (BP)
	Report

Crow Trees
Attendance: 125
Referee: Michael Harris

- Game rescheduled from 3 March 2018.

17 March 2018
15:00

Chester	P – P	Leicester Lions

Hare Lane

- Game originally rescheduled from 3 March 2018 but postponed again due to waterlogged pitch caused by heavy rain. Game to be rescheduled for 31 March 2018.

17 March 2018
15:00

(BP) Macclesfield	28 – 12	Luctonians
	Report

Priory Park
Attendance: 145
Referee: Dan Parrott

- Game rescheduled from 9 December 2017.

17 March 2018
15:00

Wharfedale	14 – 33	Tynedale (BP)
	Report

The Avenue
Attendance: 315
Referee: Ben Davis

- Game rescheduled from 16 December 2017.

=== Round 26 ===
24 March 2018
14:00

(BP) Otley	27 – 38	Tynedale (BP)
	Report

Cross Green
Attendance: 400
Referee: Harry Walbaum

24 March 2018
14:30

(BP) Blaydon	24 – 52	Sedgley Park (BP)
	Report

Crow Trees
Attendance: 217
Referee: Ben Rayner

24 March 2018
15:00

(BP) Chester	59 – 7	Sheffield Tigers
	Report

Hare Lane
Attendance: 335
Referee: Daniel Woods

24 March 2018
15:00

(BP) Huddersfield	29 – 12	Leicester Lions
	Report

Lockwood Park
Attendance: 173
Referee: Matthew Riley

24 March 2018
15:00

(BP) Luctonians	33 – 32	Hinckley (2BP)
	Report

Mortimer Park
Attendance: 311
Referee: Adam Wookey

24 March 2018
15:00

(BP) Sheffield	17 – 21	Macclesfield
	Report

Abbeydale Park
Attendance: 200
Referee: Gregg Dawson

24 March 2018
15:00

(BP) Stourbridge	37 – 26	South Leicester
	Report

Stourton Park
Attendance: 400
Referee: Andrew MacNeaney

24 March 2018
15:00

Wharfedale	6 – 20	Sale FC
	Report

The Avenue
Attendance: 526
Referee: George Selwood

=== Rounds 19, 22 & 24 (rescheduled games) ===
29 March 2018
19:45

(BP) Wharfedale	24 – 31	Sedgley Park (BP)
	Report

The Avenue
Attendance: 578
Referee: Harry Walbaum

- Game rescheduled from 3 March 2018.

31 March 2018
14:00

(BP) Blaydon	30 – 0	Luctonians
	Report

Kingston Park
Attendance: 210
Referee: Jamie Leahy

- Game rescheduled from 20 January 2018.

31 March 2018
14:00

(BP) Otley	29 – 3	South Leicester
	Report

Cross Green
Attendance: 183
Referee: Michael Harris

- Game rescheduled from 3 March 2018.

31 March 2018
15:00

(BP) Chester	34 – 5	Leicester Lions
	Report

Hare Lane
Attendance: 330
Referee: Llyr ApGeraint-Roberts

- Game originally rescheduled from 3 March 2018 & then 17 March 2018 when it was postponed again.

31 March 2018
15:00

Macclesfield	0 – 37	Sale FC (BP)
	Report

Priory Park
Attendance: 214
Referee: Alexander Thomas

- Game rescheduled from 10 February 2018.

31 March 2018
15:00

Sheffield	P – P	Tynedale

Abbeydale Park

- Originally rescheduled from 3 March 2018 but postponed again due to a waterlogged pitch caused by heavy rain. Game to be rescheduled for 5 May 2018.

=== Round 27 ===
7 April 2018
15:00

(BP) Leicester Lions	17 – 21	Sheffield
	Report

Westleigh Park
Attendance: 126
Referee: Matt Astle

7 April 2018
14:30

(BP) Sedgley Park	43 – 10	Huddersfield
	Report

Park Lane
Attendance: 210
Referee: Ben Rayner

7 April 2018
15:00

(BP) Hinckley	26 – 0	Stourbridge
	Report

Leicester Road
Attendance: 725
Referee: Harry Walbaum

7 April 2018
15:00

(BP) Macclesfield	28 – 21	Otley (BP)
	Report

Priory Park
Attendance: 178
Referee: Matthew Riley

7 April 2018
15:00

Sale FC	30 – 28	Chester (2BP)
	Report

Heywood Road
Attendance: 321
Referee: Chris Bennett

7 April 2018
15:00

(BP) Sheffield Tigers	26 – 34	Blaydon (BP)
	Report

Dore Moor
Attendance: 109
Referee: Matt Turvey

7 April 2018
15:00

South Leicester	27 – 16	Wharfedale
	Report

Welford Road Ground
Attendance: 120
Referee: James O'Brien

7 April 2018
15:00

Tynedale	28 – 12	Luctonians
	Report

Tynedale Park
Attendance: 480
Referee: Benjamin Davis

=== Round 28 ===
14 April 2018
14:00

(BP) Blaydon	24 – 36	Sale FC (BP)
	Report

Kingston Park
Attendance: 250
Referee: Michael Harris

14 April 2018
14:00

(BP) Leicester Lions	29 – 50	Sedgley Park (BP)
	Report

Westleigh Park
Attendance: 127
Referee: Ben Wilde

14 April 2018
15:00

Chester	P – P	South Leicester

Hare Lane

- Postponed due to waterlogged pitch. Game to be rescheduled for 5 May 2018.

14 April 2018
15:00

(BP) Huddersfield	31 – 10	Sheffield Tigers
	Report

Lockwood Park
Attendance: 263
Referee: Michael Woods

14 April 2018
15:00

Luctonians	17 – 12	Macclesfield (BP)
	Report

Mortimer Park
Attendance: 412
Referee: Chris Bennett

14 April 2018
15:00

(BP) Sheffield	12 – 17	Otley
	Report

Abbeydale Park
Attendance: 250
Referee: James O'Brien

14 April 2018
15:00

(BP) Stourbridge	35 – 34	Tynedale (2BP)
	Report

Stourton Park
Attendance: 300
Referee: Charlie Gayther

14 April 2018
15:00

(BP) Wharfedale	44 – 19	Hinckley
	Report

The Avenue
Attendance: 564
Referee: Jamie Leahy

=== Round 29 ===
21 April 2018
14:00

Otley	10 – 24	Luctonians
	Report

Cross Green
Attendance: 320
Referee: Callum Sharp

21 April 2018
14:30

(BP) Sedgley Park	75 – 14	Sheffield
	Report

Park Lane
Attendance: 300
Referee: Chris Bennett

- Sheffield are relegated.

21 April 2018
15:00

(BP) Hinckley	40 – 24	Chester (BP)
	Report

Leicester Road
Attendance: 790 (Note: The Rugby Paper reported an attendance of 790 for the game between Hinckley and Chester on 21 April 2018 while the NCA had 690. From talking to the Hinckley chairman it turns out that the 790 figure reported in The Rugby Paper was correct.)
Referee: Joe James

21 April 2018
15:00

(BP) Macclesfield	50 – 33	Stourbridge (BP)
	Report

Priory Park
Attendance: 205
Referee: Tim Allat

21 April 2018
15:00

(BP) Sale FC	45 – 10	Huddersfield
	Report

Heywood Road
Attendance: 392
Referee: Benjamin Davis

21 April 2018
15:00

Sheffield Tigers	23 – 10	Leicester Lions

Dore Moor
Attendance: 168
Referee: Ben Rayner

21 April 2018
15:00

(BP) South Leicester	48 – 34	Blaydon (BP)
	Report

Welford Road Ground
Attendance: 150
Referee: Daniel Parrott

21 April 2018
15:00

(BP) Tynedale	22 – 24	Wharfedale (BP)
	Report

Tynedale Park
Attendance: 640
Referee: Michael Harris

=== Round 30 ===
28 April 2018
15:00

(2BP) Blaydon	36 – 40	Hinckley (BP)
	Report

Kingston Park
Attendance: 250
Referee: Matt Turvey

- Blaydon are relegated.

28 April 2018
15:00

(BP) Chester	34 – 33	Tynedale (2BP)
	Report

Hare Lane
Attendance: 236
Referee: James O'Brien

28 April 2018
15:00

(BP) Huddersfield	41 – 33	South Leicester (BP)
	Report

Lockwood Park
Attendance: 298
Referee: Tim Allatt

28 April 2018
15:00

Leicester Lions	5 – 37	Sale FC
	Report

Westleigh Park
Attendance: 235
Referee: Alexis Manley

- Sale FC are champions.

28 April 2018
15:00

(BP) Luctonians	76 – 12	Sheffield
	Report

Mortimer Park
Attendance: 347
Referee: Charles Gayther

28 April 2018
15:00

(BP) Sedgley Park	80 – 19	Sheffield Tigers
	Report

Park Lane
Attendance: 295
Referee: Michael Harris

28 April 2018
15:00

(BP) Stourbridge	31 – 5	Otley
	Report

Stourton Park
Attendance: 550
Referee: Cliff Bennett

28 April 2018
15:00

Wharfedale	30 – 21	Macclesfield
	Report

The Avenue
Attendance: 830
Referee: Neil Chivers

=== Rounds 21 & 24 & 28 (rescheduled games) ===
5 May 2018
14:00

(BP) Leicester Lions	21 – 22	Luctonians (BP)
	Report

Westleigh Park
Attendance: 230
Referee: Matt Turvey

- Game rescheduled from 3 February 2018.

5 May 2018
15:00

Macclesfield	C – C	Hinckley

Priory Park

- Game rescheduled from 3 March 2018 but cancelled as result would not adversely affect league standings.

5 May 2018
15:00

Sheffield	C – C	Tynedale

Abbeydale Park

- Game originally rescheduled from 3 March 2018 and then again from 31 March 2018. Would eventually be cancelled as result would not adversely affect league standings.

5 May 2018
15:00

Chester	C – C	south Leicester

Hare Lane

- Game rescheduled from 14 April 2018 but cancelled as result would not adversely affect league standings.

=== Round 24 (rescheduled game) ===
12 May 2018
15:00

(BP) Luctonians	21 – 22	Sale FC

Mortimer Park
Attendance: 942
Referee: Harry Walbaum

- Game rescheduled from 3 March 2018. Luctonians are relegated.

== Promotion play-off ==
Each season, the runners-up in the National League 2 North and National League 2 South participate in a play-off for promotion to National Division 1. Chinnor were runners up in the 2017–18 National League 2 South, and because they had a better record than the 2017–18 National League 2 North runners up, Sedgley Park, they host the play-off match.

Team	Pld	W	D	L	PF	PA	PD	TB	LB	Pts
Chinnor (P)	30	26	1	3	1010	679	+331	25	0	131
Sedgley Park	30	24	0	6	1111	674	+437	26	4	126

(P) Promoted

5 May 2018
15:00

Chinnor	40 – 31	Sedgley Park
	Report

Kingsey Road
Attendance: 1,378
Referee: Neil Chivers

== Attendances ==
- Does not include promotion play-off.

Club	Home games	Total	Average	Highest	Lowest	% Capacity
Blaydon	15	3,733	249	650	125	11%
Chester (Note: Chester would only play 14 home games as their rescheduled game against South Leicester was cancelled as the result would not adversely affect the final league standings.)	14	4,835	345	389	236	17%
Hinckley	15	8,126	542	790	235	27%
Huddersfield	15	4,335	289	408	150	19%
Leicester Lions	15	2,057	137	235	80	7%
Luctonians	15	5,678	379	942	268	15%
Macclesfield (Note: Macclesfield would only play 14 home games as their rescheduled game against Hinckley was cancelled as the result would not adversely affect the final league standings.)	14	3,782	270	527	145	22%
Otley	15	5,414	361	1,106	183	5%
Sale FC	15	6,147	410	1,500	213	12%
Sedgley Park	15	3,627	242	350	57	8%
Sheffield (Note: Sheffield would only play 14 home games as their rescheduled game against Tynedale was cancelled as the result would not adversely affect the final league standings.)	14	4,388	313	1,820	100	9%
Sheffield Tigers	15	2,673	178	724	81	18%
South Leicester	15	1,727	115	199	75	
Stourbridge	15	5,573	372	550	250	11%
Tynedale	15	7,215	481	850	300	24%
Wharfedale	15	6,917	461	830	315	23%

== Individual statistics ==
- Note that points scorers includes tries as well as conversions, penalties and drop goals. Appearance figures also include coming on as substitutes (unused substitutes not included). Does not include promotion play-off.

=== Top points scorers ===
Rank	Player	Team	Appearances	Points
1	(England) Rickie Aley	South Leicester	28	343
2	(England) Chris Johnson	Sale FC	30	324
3	(England) Tom Barrett	Wharfedale	26	247
4	(England) Stephen Collins	Sedgley Park	25	246
5	(England) Joe Wilson	Hinckley	25	237
6	(England) Ashley Smith	Tynedale	22	213
7	(England) Joe Rowntree	Otley	27	199
8	(England) Mark Ireland	Sheffield Tigers	21	185
9	(England) Lewis Barker	Macclesfield	21	161
10	(England) Harry Davey	Huddersfield	18	150

=== Top try scorers ===
Rank	Player	Team	Appearances	Tries
1	(England) Myles Bean	South Leicester	29	27
2	(England) Jamie Broadley	Sheffield Tigers	29	26
3	(England) Jamie Harrison	Sedgley Park	29	24
4	(England) Andrew Riley	Sedgley Park	28	22
5	(England) Daniel Maher	Sedgley Park	28	21
6	(England) Alex Salt	Hinckley	27	18
7	(England) Devon Constant	Leicester Lions	26	17
8	(England) Guy Pike	Tynedale	23	15
8	(England) James Ailes	Sale FC	28	15
8	(England) Jack Appleton	Blaydon	30	15

== Season records ==
=== Team ===
Largest home win — 72 points

89 – 17 Stourbridge at home to Blaydon on 27 January 2018

Largest away win — 37 points (3)

40 – 3 Leicester Lions away to Luctonians on 14 October 2017
47 – 10 Sale FC away to Sheffield on 13 January 2018
37 – 0 Sale FC away to Macclesfield on 31 March 2018

Most points scored — 89 points

89 – 17 Stourbridge at home to Blaydon on 27 January 2018

Most tries in a match — 14

Stourbridge at home to Blaydon on 27 January 2018

Most conversions in a match — 10 (2)

Sedgley Park at home to Sheffield on 21 April 2018
Sedgley Park at home to Sheffield Tigers on 28 April 2018

Most penalties in a match — 6 (2)

South Leicester at home to Tynedale on 21 October 2017
Huddersfield at home to Sedgley Park on 2 December 2017

Most drop goals in a match — 2

Wharfedale at home to Luctonians on 6 January 2018

=== Attendances ===
Highest — 1,820

Sheffield at home to Sheffield Tigers on 23 December 2017

Lowest — 57

Sedgley Park at home to Otley on 17 March 2018

Highest average attendance — 542

Hinckley

Lowest average attendance — 115

South Leicester

=== Player ===
Most points in a match — 35

(England) Stephen Collins for Sedgley Park at home to Sheffield Tigers on 28 April 2018

Most tries in a match - 5

(England) Myles Bean for South Leicester at home to Blaydon on 21 April 2018

Most conversions in a match - 10

(England) Stephen Collins for Sedgley Park at home to Sheffield Tigers on 28 April 2018

Most penalties in a match — 6 (2)

(England) Rickie Aley for South Leicester at home to Tynedale on 21 October 2017
(England) Harry Davey for Huddersfield at home to Sedgley Park on 2 December 2017

Most drop goals in a match — 2

(England) Tom Barrett for Wharfedale at home to Luctonians on 6 January 2018

== See also ==
- English rugby union system
- Rugby union in England
