= 2017–18 Premiership Rugby A League =

- Countries: England
- Date: 1 September 2017 – May 2018
- Matches played: 11
- Tries scored: 80 (average 7.3 per match)

Official website
- www.premiershiprugby.com

The 2017–18 Premiership Rugby A League is the 15th season of the A League of the English domestic Premiership Rugby competition and the eighth to be sponsored by Aviva.

The reigning champions entering the season were Northampton Wanderers, who claimed their second title after defeating Gloucester United 36 - 15 in the 2016–17 final.

London Irish A return to the league after a year's hiatus last season due to the first team's relegation from the Premiership, Bristol United remain in the league despite their first team being relegated last year.

== Teams ==
North Pool:

- Leicester Tigers A
- Newcastle Falcons A
- Northampton Wanderers
- Sale Jets
- Wasps A
- Worcester Cavaliers

South Pool:

- Bath United
- Bristol United
- Exeter Braves
- Gloucester United
- Harlequins A
- London Irish A
- Saracens Storm

== Regular season ==
Fixtures for the season were announced by Premiership Rugby on 14 July 2017.

All fixtures are subject to change.

=== Northern Conference Round 1 ===
4 September 2017
19:30

Worcester Cavaliers	21–61	Leicester Tigers A

Sixways

4 September 2017
19:30

Wasps A	21–67	Newcastle Falcons A

Ivor Preece Field

4 September 2017
19:30

Sale Jets	21–61	Northampton Wanderers

Heywood Road

=== Northern Conference Round 2 ===
9 September 2017
19:00

Northampton Wanderers	38–10	Leicester Tigers A

Franklin's Gardens

9 September 2017
19:30

Worcester Cavaliers	21–61	Leicester Tigers A

Sixways

11 September 2017
19:30

Sale Jets	12–22	Wasps A

Heywood Road
