= Ivor Preece =

British Lions & England international rugby union player

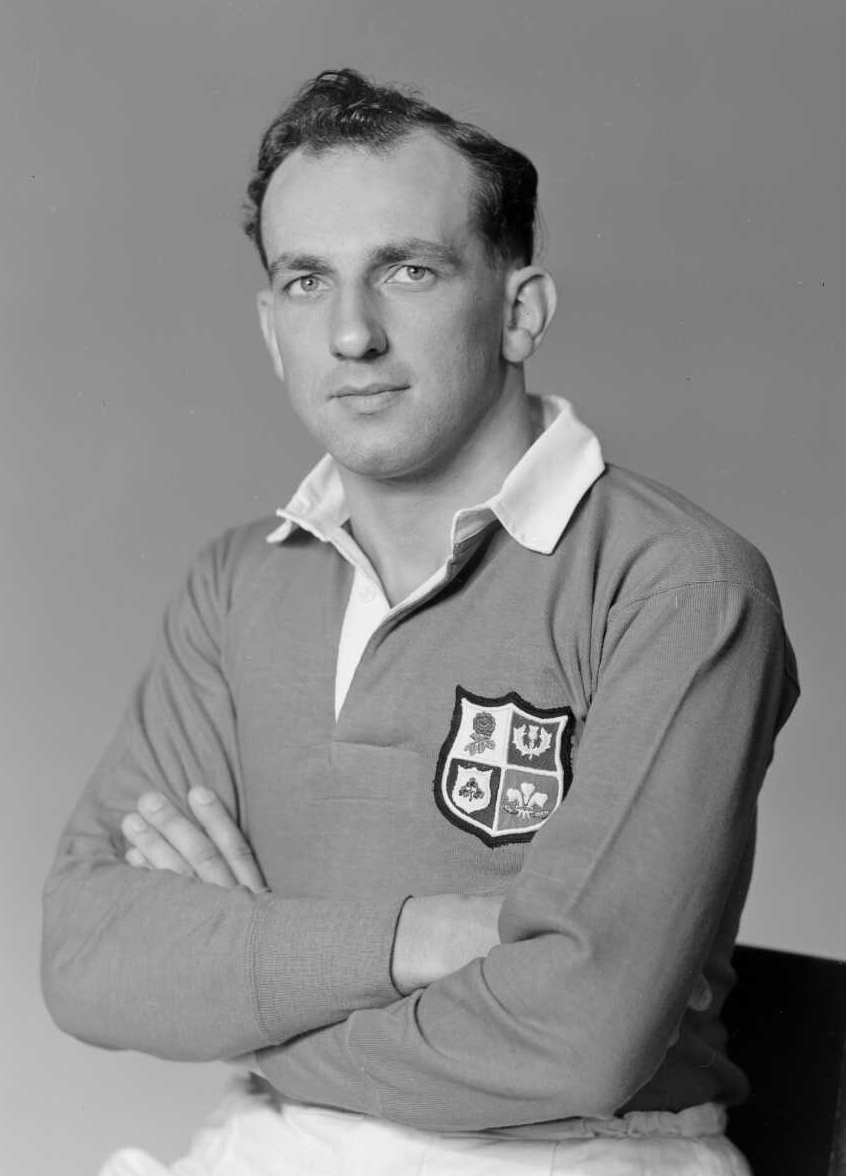
- Preece in New Zealand in 1950
- Born: Ivor Preece; 15 December 1920 Coventry, Warwickshire, England
- Died: 14 March 1987 (aged 66)
- School: Broad Street School

Rugby union career
- Position: Fly-half
Amateur team(s)
Years	Team	Apps	(Points)
- Broadstreet RFC
- Coventry R.F.C.
International career
Years	Team	Apps	(Points)
1948–1951	England	12	(3)
1950	British Lions	1	(0)

Ivor Preece (15 December 1920 – 14 March 1987) was an English rugby union footballer who represented and captained England Schools, England and Coventry. He is the only Coventry RFC player to have achieved this accolade. He was selected to play with the British and Irish Lions, on their tour to New Zealand and Australia in 1950.

Born in Coventry in Warwickshire (now in the West Midlands), he attended Broad Street School, Foleshill, Coventry playing in the schools successful side winning the Coventry F.C Shield one of the oldest trophies played for in schoolboy rugby throughout the world being established in 1897. Once his playing career was over he still dedicated himself to the game of rugby union serving as president for Coventry Schools, Warwickshire RFU, Coventry R.F.C. and Broadstreet RFC from 1970 until his death in 1987. Preece's son, Peter Preece, was also an England rugby union international who played for Coventry – he was capped 12 times between 1972 and 1976.

Broadstreet RFC honoured Preece by naming their ground the Ivor Preece Field after him.

== International matches played ==
England

- Ireland 1948, 1950, 1951
- Scotland 1948, 1949, 1950
- France 1948, 1949, 1950, 1951
- Wales 1950, 1951

== British Lions ==
- New Zealand 1950

Lions 1950 British Lions tour to New Zealand and Australia
