= Binley Woods =

Village and civil parish in Warwickshire, England

Coordinates: 52.393°N 1.419°W

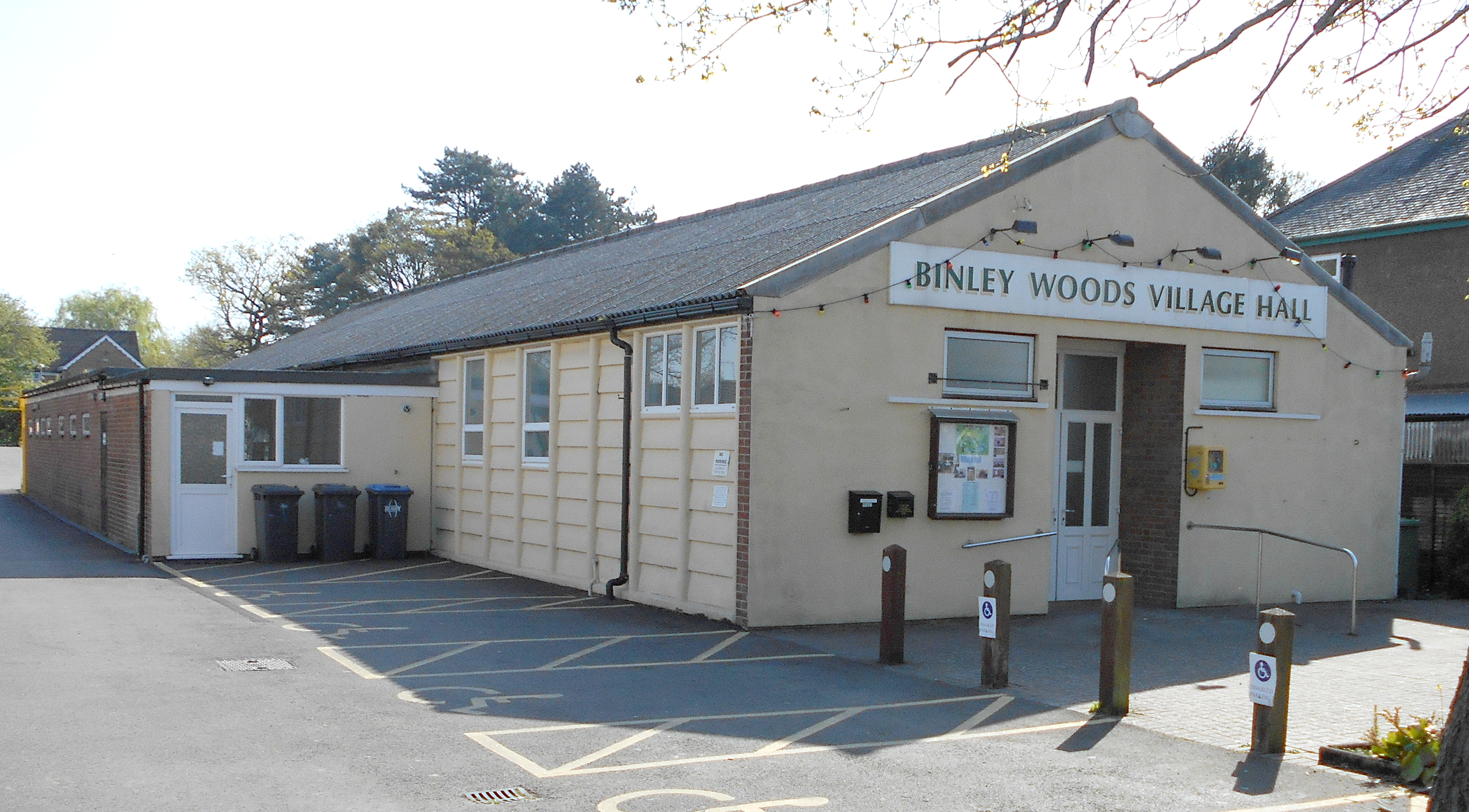
- Binley Woods village hall

- Location within Warwickshire
- Population: 2,568 (2021)
- OS grid reference: SP395775
- Civil parish: Binley Woods
- District: Rugby
- Shire county: Warwickshire
- Region: West Midlands
- Country: England
- Sovereign state: United Kingdom
- Post town: COVENTRY
- Postcode district: CV3
- Dialling code: 024
- Police: Warwickshire
- Fire: Warwickshire
- Ambulance: West Midlands
- UK Parliament: Rugby

Binley Woods is a suburban village and civil parish in Warwickshire, England. The village lies marginally beyond the eastern outskirts of Coventry, outside the formal city boundaries. Binley Woods is within the Borough of Rugby, although the town of Rugby is around 7 miles (11 km) to the east. In the 2021 census the parish had a population of 2,568.

The village is 5 miles (8 km) east of central Coventry, on the A428 road, east of the junction with the A46 road. The small village of Brandon lies 1.5 miles (2.4 km) to the east, with the larger village of Wolston a further one-half mile (0.8 km) to the south.

== History ==
Binley Woods is a relatively modern village. Settlement began in the 1920s, when some of the estates of Coombe Abbey were sold off and people began to settle and build homes in the area, which was then known as Binley Common. In the early years, the village lacked modern amenities such as paved roads, street lighting, piped water or mains drainage; though these were gradually provided from the 1930s onwards, some of the side roads were not paved or lighted until the 1960s. During the 1940s, many people trekked to Binley Woods from Coventry to avoid air raids, often living in shacks and caravans.

The village adopted its current name of Binley Woods in 1961 after a vote by villagers. The name was chosen in order to avoid confusion with, and establish a separate identity from nearby Binley, a suburb of south-east Coventry. As the name suggests, Binley Woods is close to some woods: Brandon Wood is next to the village. on 14 June 1961 the parish was renamed from "Binley" to "Binley Woods".

A village church was established in Binley Woods in 1987, which doubles as the village hall.

== Facilities ==
The village boasts one public house, The Roseycombe. There is a village hall on Rugby Road. There is also a post office, a pre school nursery and a primary school, along with a range of shops.

The village is now home to Broadstreet RFC, a National League Rugby club that moved to a new ground called Ivor Preece Field in the village in 2001, after selling their ground in Binley, Coventry.

=== Brandon Wood ===
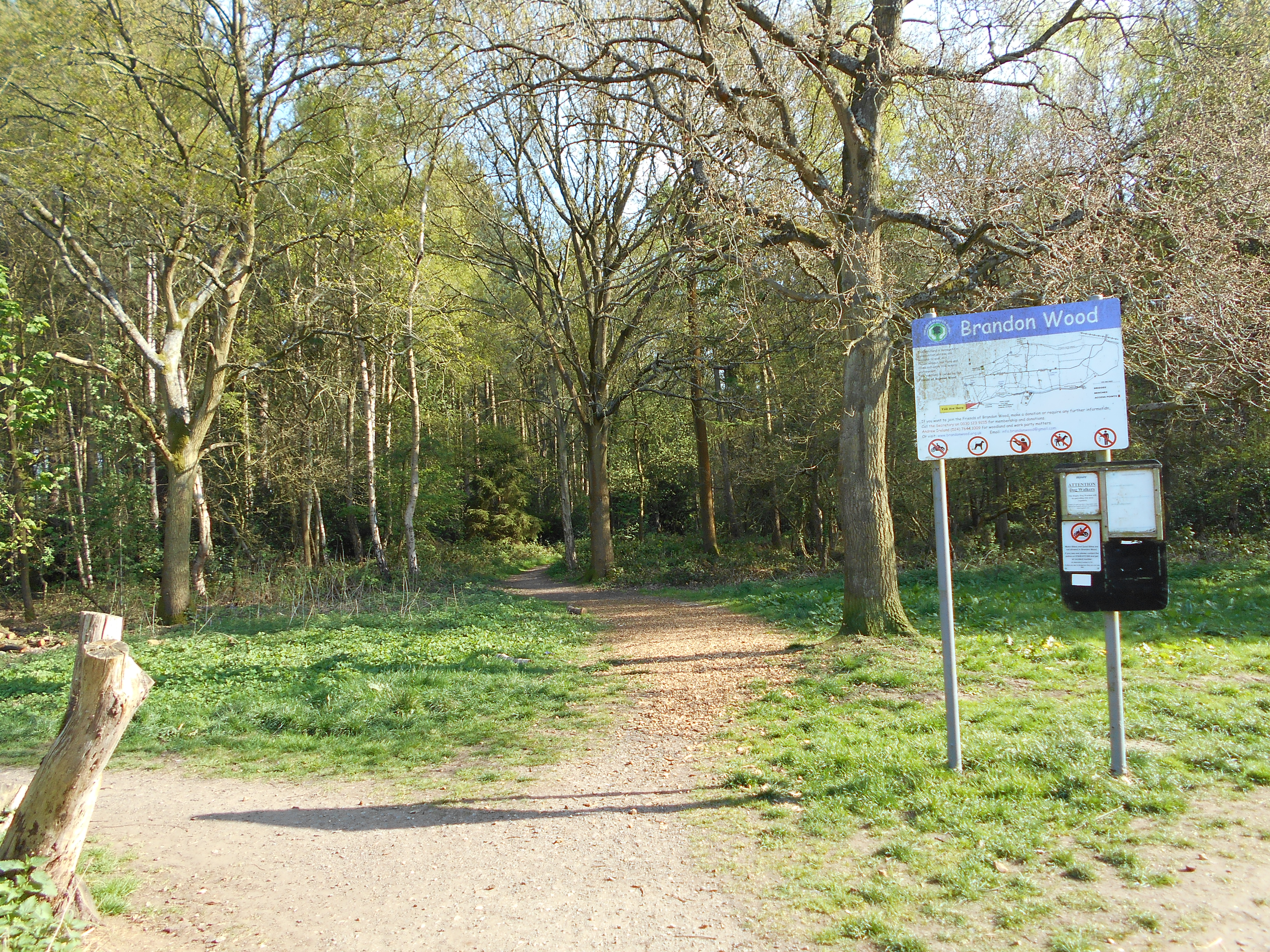
Brandon Wood

Brandon Wood, just south of the village from which it takes its name, covers an area of 178 acres (72 ha): it is a designated ancient woodland, having been mentioned in the Domesday Book of 1086. It was once run by the Forestry Commission, but since 1981 it has been managed by a local group, the "Friends of Brandon Wood", who in 2000 purchased the wood from the Forestry Commission; it is now run as a community wood and is open to the public.

== Use as a filming location ==
One of Binley Woods' claims to fame is that it was used as one of the locations for the filming of the 1990s BBC sitcom Keeping Up Appearances; exterior shots of Hyacinth Bucket's house were filmed at 117 Heather Road. 119 Heather Road was used as the house of her neighbours Elizabeth Warden and Emmet Hawksworth.

== Notable residents ==
- Allen Lloyd, founder of LloydsPharmacy, grew up in Binley Woods.
- The actors John Marquez, and his brother Martin Marquez grew up in the village.
- David Moorcroft, former runner and Chief Executive of UK Athletics lived in Binley Woods.
- Mark Pawsey, former Member of Parliament for Rugby, grew up in the village.
- Josh Eccles, professional footballer, grew up in the village
