= Broadstreet RFC =

English rugby union club in Coventry, England

Broadstreet
- Full name: Broadstreet Rugby Football Club
- Union: Warwickshire RFU
- Nickname: Street
- Founded: 1929; 97 years ago
- Location: Binley Woods, Coventry, West Midlands, England
- Region: Midlands
- Ground: The Ivor Preece Field (Capacity: 1,500 (250 seats))
- Chairman: (England) Simon Skene
- President: (England) Gerry Watts
- Captain: (England) Morgan Dawes
- League: Regional 2 East Midlands
- 2025–26: 3rd (promoted to Regional 1 Midlands)
Team kit

Official website
- www.broadstreetrfc.co.uk

Broadstreet Rugby Football Club is a rugby union club based in the city of Coventry, West Midlands, England. The club currently play in Regional 1 Midlands; at the fifth tier of the English rugby union system, following their promotion from Regional 2 East Midlands at the end of the 2025–26 season. The 2014–15 season was the third time the club had played in the fourth tier of English rugby (having progressed through the Rugby Football Union Midland Division), but the first time it had maintained at that level. Furthermore, the club have also recently enjoyed success, by winning the Warwickshire Cup (for a record thirteen times).

Their home ground is The Ivor Preece Field, named in honour of former President Ivor Preece which was opened in Coventry in 2002. Their previous ground from 1973 to 2002 was located on Brandon Road, Coventry. Before that the club played at the Henley Road ground, where the club had an active social club with over 300 members until its sale and closure.

== History ==
The Broad Street Old Boys' Rugby Club was founded in 1929 by former and current pupils of the Broad Street School in Broad Street, Foleshill, Coventry. The club's history goes back even further to when Broad Street School was opened in 1911. It was many years later that the club decided drop the "old boys'" title and merge the two words to become one and known as Broadstreet Rugby Club. In the late 1980s Broadstreet incorporated another local club, Caludon Castle RFC.

It was after winning the Coventry FC Shield in 1929 the old boys' club was formed with the help of the school sports master 'Pop' H T Suddens. With seven former schoolboy internationals, it was a successful team, going on to have twenty-two schoolboy England players and three senior England players, Ivor Preece, Ernie Robinson and Phil Judd who went on to captain England in 1967.

When the ‘Old Boys’ was formed, a farmer’s field at Bedlam Lane was the home ground and this was used until after the Second World War. After the war, the club rented grounds in various parts of Coventry, eventually using the War Memorial Park, Coventry as its base until the 1950s. A site for a new ground was purchased in Henley Road from a Colonel Bushill in the early 1950s. Raising the money to purchase the ground and to build the clubhouse was an enormous task, but it was a very proud day for all involved at the time, when Cliff Harrison, President of the Warwickshire RFU, opened the club in 1955.

Over the next few years the club extended, but it became obvious that the facilities at Henley Road were no longer large enough to cope with the number of teams that we regularly playing, and in 1970 the club entered into an agreement with Alf Youell of Youell Investments, to sell only the pitches at Henley Road, and to move to a new ground and clubhouse at Brandon Road.

The new ground was opened in 1973 by Bob Weighhill, Secretary of the Rugby Football Union, and it was named the Ivor Preece Field, in honour of Ivor Preece, England and British Lions, who was also the club's President at the time. The club retained the Henley Road clubhouse as a social club with over three hundred members until this was sold off.

Once again, the club outgrew the facilities at the Brandon Road ground, and have now moved to the other side of the Coventry Eastern Bypass, to the new Ivor Preece Field. The new ground was opened by the great Rugby World Cup winning captain Martin Johnson (rugby union), captain of England national rugby union team, The British and Irish Lions, and Leicester Tigers. The new clubhouse has facilities, a 250-seater stand, car parking, five senior pitches, (two floodlit), mini and junior pitches, and forty-six acres of ground. The Ivor Preece field was used for representative rugby with the semi-finals of the Daily Mail schools rugby competition played at both age groups here England Deaf Rugby used the rugby facilities for training sessions and international matches.

Broadstreet Rugby Football club regard themselves as one of the top fifty clubs in Europe. The club regularly field two senior sides and one colts team during the season. At under-age level, the club run one of the most successful Mini and Junior sections in the county, with over two-hundred boys of all ages being coached by a band of qualified coaches.

== Honours ==
=== 1st XV ===
- Warwickshire 1 champions: 1989–90
- Staffordshire/Warwickshire champions: 1990–91
- Warwickshire Cup winners (13): 1992–93, 1994–95, 1996–97, 1997–98, 1998–99, 1999–2000, 2000–01, 2003–04, 2004–05, 2005–06, 2006–07, 2007–08, 2008–09, 2016–17
- National League 3 Midlands (formerly Midlands Division 1) champions (4): 2001–02, 2008–09, 2013–14, 2016–17
- Midlands Division 2 West champions: 2005–06
- Regional 2 East Midlands promotion via play-off: 2025–26

=== Youth ===
- Warwickshire Colts Cup Winners: 1993–94, 2016–17
- Coventry and Warwickshire benevolent Cup winners(2): 2000–01, 2017–18

== Summary of league positions ==
After the use of Merit tables for the prior three seasons, in 1987 the RFU implemented a National League system. Below is an incomplete list summarizing Broadstreet's final league positions:

- 1998–99: Midlands 1 (level 5) — 5th
- 1999–00: Midlands 1 — 5th
- 2000–01: Midlands 1 — 4th
- 2001–02: Midlands 1 — 1st (champions)
- 2002–03: National League 3 (North) (level 4) — 12th (relegated)
- 2003–04: Midlands 1 — 9th
- 2004–05: Midlands 1 — 11th (Relegated)
- 2005–06: Midlands 2 (West) (level 6) — 1st (champions)
- 2006–07: Midlands 1 — 4th
- 2007–08: Midlands 1 — 3rd
- 2008–09: Midlands 1 — 1st (champions)
- 2009–10: National League 2 (North) (level 4) — 14th (relegated)
- 2010–11: National League 3 (Midlands) (level 5) — 5th
- 2011–12: National League 3 (Midlands) — 11th
- 2012–13: National League 3 (Midlands) — 8th
- 2013–14: National League 3 (Midlands) — 1st (champions)
- 2014–15: National League 2 (North) (level 4) — 7th
- 2015–16: National League 2 (North) — 15th (Relegated)
- 2016–17: National League 3 (Midlands) (level 5) — 1st (champions)
- 2017–18: National league 2 (South) — 15th (relegated)
- 2018–19: Midlands Premier (level 5) — 4th

== Current squad ==
Forwards

- Jake Dodd (Prop)
- George Walsh (Prop)
- Ben Ritchie (Prop)
- Sam Harcourt (Hooker)
- Tony Worthington (Lock)
- Chris Zutic (Back Row)
- Chris Idehen (Back Row)
- Nick Rhodes (Back Row)
- Morgan Dawes (Back Row)
- Brett Daynes (Back Row)

Backs

- Nick Thatcher (Scrum Half)
- Lewis Dodds (Scrum half)
- Cliffie Hodgson (Fly Half)
- Josh Hickman (Centre)
- Jack Webber ( Centre)
- Andy Murray (Centre)
- Ollie Gregg (Wing)
- Harry Hudson (Fullback)
- Dale Glover (Fullback)

=== Coaches ===
- Head coach: Cliffie Hodgson
- Head physio: Tom Hale
- Assistant physio: James Clifford

== Recent events ==
Winners of the “Don Robbins Shield” Warwickshire RFU Double Tops Midweek Darts Competition.

The Broadstreet development squad recently won the 2017–18 Coventry and Warwickshire benevolent Cup beating Stoke Old Boys 26–22, retaining the cup from the previous season.

== Notable former players ==
- (England) Ivor Preece
- (England) Ernie Robinson
- (England) Phil Judd
- (England) Adam Balding
- (England) Lee Crofts
- (England) Asher Opoku-Fordjour

== International players ==
The following players have all gone on to play for their country. Unless otherwise noted, all played for England.

- (England) Ivor Preece
- (England) Ernie Robinson
- (England) Phil Judd
- (England) Shane Geraghty
- (England) Asher Opoku-Fordjour
