= Ivor Preece Field =

Rugby stadium in Binley Woods, Warwickshire, England

Coordinates: 52.3964°N 1.4300°W

- The 'Street
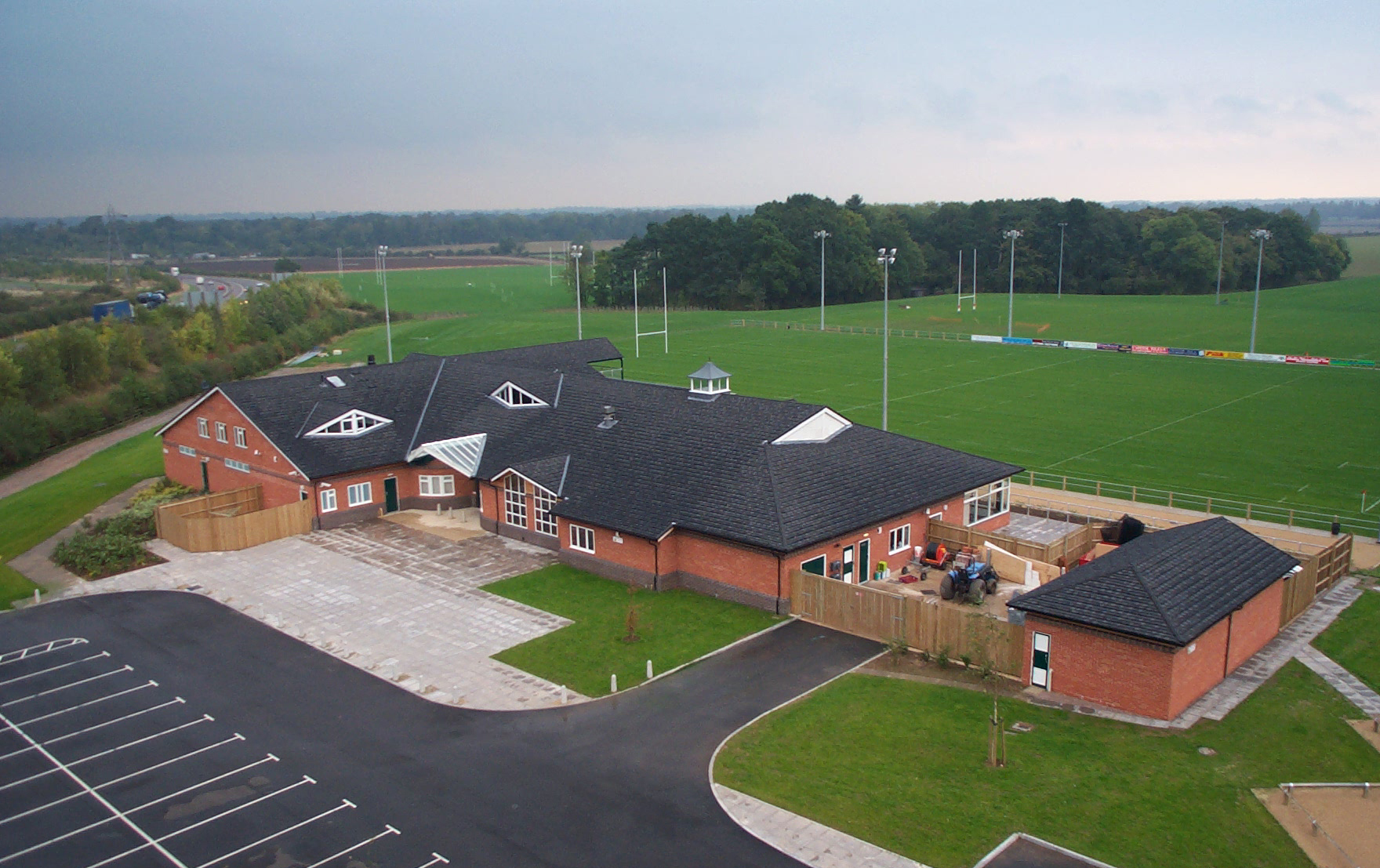
- Interactive map of Ivor Preece Field
- Location: Binley Woods, Warwickshire, England
- Owner: Broadstreet Rugby Club
- Capacity: 1,500 (250 seats)
- Surface: Grass
- Field size: 46 acres (190,000 m^{2})

Construction
- Groundbreaking: September 2000
- Opened: August 2002
- Architect: SR Davis Architects

Tenant
- Broadstreet RUFC

The Ivor Preece Field on Rugby Road, Binley Woods, Warwickshire is the home ground of Broadstreet Rugby Club, designed by SR Davis architects with the sports ground designed by Peter Jones Associates, Quantity Surveyors Bucknall Austin, project managed by Falcon House Project Management.

The venue hosted its first game on 1 March 2001, and it officially opened in August 2002. The official opening day saw world cup-winning captain Martin Johnson open the club and grounds. On this occasion, the current first XV faced off against a select president's team. The ground is named in honor of Ivor Preece (1920–87), who played for and captained Coventry R.F.C. and the England national rugby union team in the 1950s and was president of Broadstreet RUFC.

The 46 acres (190,000 m^{2}) allow up to five rugby matches and one football match to be played with two of the rugby pitches floodlit. The rugby club and facilities plays host to all manor of rugby sides on varying levels. Not only Broadstreet RFC the grounds owners, but Coventry And District Union, Warwickshire RFU, Midlands RFU for training sessions and full games and previously Premiership side Wasps for training and Premiership Rugby Shield matches.

In early 2008 for England Deaf Rugby Union in their matches against The Welsh Deaf Rugby Union in February and March saw the visit of The Scottish Deaf Rugby Union XV.

The grounds have also played host to local football sides and the Coventry Cassidy Jets American football team.
