= 1952–53 Rugby Union County Championship =

English rugby union competition

1952–53 County Championship
- Countries: England
- Champions: Yorkshire (10th title)
- Runners-up: East Midlands

The 1952–53 Rugby Union County Championship was the 53rd edition of England's premier rugby union club competition at the time.

Yorkshire won the competition for the tenth time (but the first since 1928) after defeating East Midlands in the final.

== Final ==
14 March 1953

Yorkshire	11–3	East Midlands
Try: Mitchell; Con: King; Pen: King (2)		Try: Macnally

Bradford

Ian King	Harrogate
Frank Sykes	Huddersfield
D Greenwood	Halifax
Jeff Butterfield	Cleckheaton
A Wood	Headingley
D Hopper	Harrogate
Dennis Shuttleworth	Headingley
W Donnelly	Otley
N Mackie	Otley
R G Porrisse	Sale
Squire Wilkins (capt)	Roundhay
R J Robins	Royal Signals
R Cross	Leeds University
Phil Taylor	Wakefield
G Mitchell	Halifax

J Hodgkins	Northampton
N Bailey	Northampton
Alan C Towell	Bedford
Lewis Cannell	St Mary's Hospital
D Macnally	Northampton
R H Haynes	Bedford
F M Fletcher	Bedford
Mike Berridge	Northampton
Trevor Smith	Northampton
Ron Jacobs	Northampton
R C Hawkes	Northampton
John Bance	Bedford
P S Collingridge	Bedford
Vic Leadbetter	Cambridge University
Don White (capt)	Northampton

== See also ==
- English rugby union system
- Rugby union in England
