= 1949–50 Rugby Union County Championship =

English rugby union competition

1949–50 County Championship
- Countries: England
- Champions: Cheshire (1st title)
- Runners-up: East Midlands

The 1949–50 Rugby Union County Championship was the 50th edition of England's premier rugby union club competition at the time.

Cheshire won the competition for the first time after defeating East Midlands in the final.

== Final ==
11 March 1950

| Cheshire | 5–0 | East Midlands |
| Try: Hill; Con: Uren |

Upper Park, Birkenhead Park
Referee: Tom Pearce (Eastern Counties)

| B L H Shone | Birkenhead Park |
| Vic Tindall | New Brighton |
| A V Rogers | Old Birkonians |
| Dick Uren | Waterloo |
| G D Hill | New Brighton |
| B J Rogers | Old Birkonians |
| L B Smith | Old Birkonians |
| H Willis | Old Caldeians |
| Herbert Jones | Winnington Park |
| D G Massey | Wilmslow |
| Jasper Bartlett | Waterloo |
| E J Loader | New Brighton |
| W Hosker | Birkenhead Park |
| J Abbott | Birkenhead Park |
| H K Rees | Birkenhead Park |

| H W Rose | Bedford |
| John Hyde | Northampton |
| Lewis Cannell | Northampton |
| Lionel Oakley | Bedford |
| A M Hall | Northampton |
| T Gray | Northampton |
| F M Fletcher | Bedford |
| Mike Berridge | Northampton |
| Trevor Smith | Northampton |
| J H Whiting | Northampton |
| W R Hamp | Northampton |
| John Bance | Bedford |
| Don White | Northampton |
| R G Furbank | Bedford |
| G Jenkins | Bedford |

== See also ==
- English rugby union system
- Rugby union in England
