= 1956–57 Rugby Union County Championship =

English rugby union competition

1956–57 County Championship
- Countries: England
- Champions: Devon (7th title)
- Runners-up: Yorkshire

The 1956–57 Rugby Union County Championship was the 57th edition of England's premier rugby union club competition at the time.

Devon won the competition for the seventh time (but first since 1912) after defeating Yorkshire in the final.

== Final ==
9 March 1957

Devon	12–3	Yorkshire
Try: Blackmore, Ridd, Homer; Pen: Blackmore		Pen: Sykes

Home Park, Plymouth
Referee: Dr P F Cooper (London Society)

C T Bowen	Newton Abbot
J L Stark	Exeter
G Williams	St Lukes College
W J Glastonbury	Plymouth Albion
M J Blackmore	Barnstaple
B E Jones	St Lukes College
D B Rees	RFC Neath
G E R Ridd (capt)	Torquay Athletic
B R Homer	Exeter
Derrick Main	St Lukes College
R L Ellis	Plymouth Albion
W L Copley	Devonport Services
F A Prosser	Devonport Services
Dick Manley	Exeter
B Sparks	St Lukes College

O Grieveson	Headingley
Frank Sykes	Northampton
Jeff Butterfield (capt)	Northampton
R R Winn	Northampton
Peter Thompson	Headingley
Phil Horrocks-Taylor	Cambridge Univ & Halifax
Dennis Shuttleworth	Waterloo
R G Porrisse	Sale
T B Ramsden	Bradford
D B Holdsworth	Otley
Squire Wilkins	United Services
N W Feather	Roundhay
A A Chappell	Roundhay
Phil Taylor	Northampton
C E Heighton	Bradford

== See also ==
- English rugby union system
- Rugby union in England
