= Phil Taylor =

Phil Taylor may refer to:

- Phil Taylor (musician) (1954–2015), English drummer, best known as "Philthy Animal" Taylor
- Phil Taylor (darts player) (born 1960), English darts player
- Phil Taylor (American football) (born 1988), American football player
- Phil Taylor (footballer, born 1917) (1917–2012), English professional footballer and manager (Liverpool FC)
- Phil Taylor (footballer, born 1958), English professional footballer (York City, Darlington FC)
- Phil Taylor (rugby union) (1931–2019), English rugby union player

== See also ==
- Philip Taylor (disambiguation)
