= Wellingborough Grammar School =

Wellingborough Grammar School can refer to one of two former schools in Wellingborough:

- A Tudor grammar school, today Wellingborough School, an independent fee-paying day school
- A grammar school established in 1930, which merged into Wrenn School, along with Wellingborough High School
