= Philip Taylor =

Philip Taylor may refer to:

- Philip Joseph Taylor (born 1931), English rugby union player
- Philip Taylor (civil engineer) (1786–1870), English civil engineer
- Philip Meadows Taylor (1808–1876), Anglo-Indian administrator and novelist
- Philip Taylor (MP), member of parliament (MP) for Weymouth and Melcombe Regis

== See also ==
- Phil Taylor (disambiguation)
