= John Hyde (rugby union) =

England international rugby union player

- Full name: John Phillip Hyde
- Born: 8 June 1930 (age 96) Wellingborough, England
- School: Wellingborough Grammar School

Rugby union career
- Position: Wing
International career
| Years | Team | Apps | (Points) |
| 1950 | England | 2 | (0) |

John Phillip Hyde (born 8 June 1930) is an English former international rugby union player.

Raised in Wellingborough, Northamptonshire, Hyde was educated at Wellingborough Grammar School. He enlisted in the Army after leaving school and served in the Northamptonshire Regiment.

Hyde, Northampton RFC and East Midlands county player, appeared as a winger for England in two 1950 Five Nations Championship matches, debuting aged 19 against France at Colombes.

== See also ==
- List of England national rugby union players
