= Horace Batten =

- Born: 17 June 1912; Long Buckby, Northamptonshire
- Died: 7 December 2014 (aged 102)
- Spouse: Barbara Harris (m. 1939)
- Children: Timothy Batten

Horace Lampard Batten (17 June 1912 – 7 December 2014) was an English shoemaker and bootmaker, who supplied a wide variety of celebrities, royalty, service personnel and others over a career spanning many decades.

== Family and early years ==
Horace Lampard Batten was born on 17 June 1912, the only child of Horace Batten. Batten's family had made riding boots since the early 19th century, with British cavalry units being one of their major customers historically. The elder Horace Batten moved to Northampton to set up a boot-making business there, and the younger Batten won a scholarship to Northampton School for Boys. He was captain of the Northampton Saints rugby club, and later was on the books for Northamptonshire in cricket as a professional, but made no first team appearances, having had to reduce his sporting commitments as the time demands of the boot-making business grew. At the age of 25 he took over the business from his father.

== Second World War ==
During the Second World War the demand for cavalry boots and other riding boots took second place to other types of footwear more important to the war effort. Batten produced deck boots for submarine crews based on boots used by Norwegian fishermen, and boots for the Women's Land Army using soles made from industrial leather belting. The King sent Batten a letter thanking him for his contribution to the war effort.

== Post war ==
Batten's firm moved back to making riding and hunting boots after the end of the war; fox-hunts had been shut down during the conflict, but resumed hunting when it finished. The business remained strong for many years, but began to decline in the later decades of the 20th century.

Batten's customers included showjumpers Nick Skelton and Harvey Smith, members of various royal families, and the wife of carmaker André Citroën. He also produced a pair of size 14 black wax calf jackboots for Dave Prowse to wear when playing Darth Vader in the Empire Strikes Back film.

Batten married Barbara Harris in 1939; she died in 1997. Batten made his last pair of boots at the age of 99, and handed over the running of the business to his son Timothy and granddaughter Emma. Batten died on 7 December 2014.
