= Barrington Black =

British lawyer

Barrington Black (born 1932) is a British lawyer who was a member of the Supreme Court of Gibraltar. a former criminal defence solicitor, metropolitan stipendiary magistrate, circuit judge and thereafter, following retirement from the English Bench, appointed a Supreme Court Judge in Gibraltar.

He retired from the bench in his 82nd year, only exceeded by Lord Denning who retired aged 83.

== Early life ==
Born in Leeds, although his great grandparents came from Russia (Bialystok) and Lithuania in 1880, a great uncle played cricket for Gloucestershire in 1911; another wrote speeches for Lloyd George in 1915, and a third became Lord Mayor of Bradford.

He was educated at Roundhay School and Leeds University (President of the Union 1952–53) and Vice President NUS.

He performed National Service 1956–58, commissioned in the Royal Army Service Corps.

Black is married with four children and 10 grandchildren.

Councillor Harrogate Borough Council 1964–67, Contested Harrogate (L) 1964 gen election. Member Court and Council Leeds University, 1979–84.

== Professional life ==
Admitted Solicitor 1956, commenced practice as Barrington Black & Co in Leeds 1958; amalgamated with, and became a partner in Walker Morris & co of Bradford, creating their Leeds base. In 1969 he left Walker Morris to re-open as Barrington Black & Co and took in Austin & Co. Black has extensive criminal defence practice in murder and "heavy" crime, including the notorious Black Panther.

The practice later amalgamated with two other old established Leeds firms, Harrison, Jobbings & Co., and Bateson, Coates & Co, and is now one of Leeds largest commercial and private client firms, operating from two offices under the name of "Blacks".

=== Judicial career ===
1984 Appointed Metropolitan Stipendiary Magistrate (now known as District Judge) sitting at Bow Street and Marylebone, 1985–93 Chairman Inner London Juvenile Court, 1991–93 Chairman Family Court, 1987 Assistant Recorder, 1989 Recorder, 1993–2005 Circuit Judge. Then, post official retirement age, he was invited to sit as Deputy Circuit Judge from 2005–07.

However, in January 2012, and approaching his 80th birthday he was invited to take up a 2-year appointment as full-time Judge of Supreme Court in Gibraltar, specifically to clear up a criminal backlog in the Protectorate, retiring in April 2014.

== Written works ==
- Both Sides of the Bench, a memoir, (Waterside Press, 2016) magazine articles for Sunday Times, Telegraph
- The Jewish Contribution to English Law (Published 2021)
- The ones they didn't print (Published 2024)
- Prolific contributor to The Times letters, and an after-dinner speaker.
