= Squire Wilkins =

England international rugby union player (1924–2012)

- Full name: Dennis Thomas Wilkins
- Born: 26 December 1924 Leeds, England
- Died: 30 January 2012 (aged 87)
- School: Roundhay School
- Occupation: Business executive

Rugby union career
- Position: Lock
International career
Years	Team	Apps	(Points)
1951–53	England	13	(0)

Dennis Thomas Wilkins (26 December 1924 – 30 January 2012) was an English international rugby union player.

== Biography ==
Wilkins was born in Leeds and educated at Roundhay School.

A second row forward, Wilkins played with Roundhay RFC, Combined Services and the Royal Navy. He didn't miss a match for England between 1951 and 1953, winning 13 caps. Captaining Yorkshire to the 1952–53 championship, Wilkins was expected to became an England captain, but missed his opportunity due to the Korean War.

Wilkins, a Fleet Air Arm pilot, was lent to the Royal Australian Navy during the Korean War.

== See also ==
- List of England national rugby union players
