= Bruce Liddington =

British headteacher (1949–2020)

Sir Bruce Liddington

Schools Commissioner
- In office 2006–2009
- Prime Minister: Tony Blair

Sir Bruce Liddington (1949 – 28 July 2020) was the schools commissioner in 2006 under Tony Blair's Government. He came from a poor area of Wellingborough and did his degree in English at Queen Mary College, and a PGCE in Cambridge. He started his teaching career in Conisbrough, and rose to headteacher at Northampton School for Boys which he improved then and changed its status from a LEA school to a grant maintained school. For this he received a knighthood.

He moved to the Department of Education advising on the details of converting to academy status. He was employed as a senior civil servant responsible for the roll out of academies. Liddington became boss of the academy sponsor E-ACT, outlining his mission 'to improve the lot of the most-deprived children'. Liddington was disgraced and resigned from the chain of academy schools following the disclosure of his overseeing its culture of extravagant expense claims, irregularities, and trips to prestige venues funded by public money, which the Times Educational Supplement compared to corruption in the US education system.

Liddington died on 28 July 2020, at the age of 70.

== Early background ==
His mother worked in a shoe factory and his father was a stonemason, he attended Wellingborough Grammar School. In his gap year he worked in a London secondary modern school as an unqualified teacher.

== Teaching career ==
He did his first degree in English at Queen Mary College, and moved on to do a PGCE in Cambridge where he listened to a lecture by the prominent chief education officer of West Yorkshire, Sir Alec Clegg. Clegg believed schools should pursue "the education of the spirit … the child's loves and hates … hopes and fears", and Liddington who said in a Guardian interview "I've always been attracted to kids who've had a hard time in life", was inspired to work in the deprived mining community of Conisbrough. He found the low levels of aspiration that he witnessed frustrating. After three years he went to the states to study for a master's degree.
