= Derrick Main =

Welsh rugby union player (1931–2022)

Derrick
- Full name: Derrick Roy Main
- Born: 20 November 1931 Abbassia, Egypt
- Died: February 2022 (aged 90)
- School: King Henry VIII Grammar School
- University: St Luke's College, Exeter
- Occupation: Teacher / Woodworker

Rugby union career
- Position: Prop
International career
Years	Team	Apps	(Points)
1959	Wales	4	(0)

Derrick Roy Main (20 November 1931 – February 2022) was a Welsh international rugby union player.

Main was born in Cairo, Egypt, to a Cornish mother and Scottish father. The family had moved to Dover, England, by the outbreak of World War II and during the conflict were evacuated to Abergavenny, Wales. He was educated at King Henry VIII Grammar School.

Following his national service, Main studied teaching at St Luke's College, Exeter. He played on the St Luke's XV and represented Devon in county fixtures, including the 1956–57 County Championship final win over Yorkshire. A prop, Main won a Wales call up in 1959, while playing with London Welsh. He featured in all four 1959 Five Nations matches, debuting in a home win over England, playing beside Bryn Meredith and Ray Prosser in the front-row.

Main initially pursued a career in teaching, working at Bancroft's School and Bishop's Stortford College. He later ran a woodworking factory in Herefordshire which repaired kitchen and household fittings.

== See also ==
- List of Wales national rugby union players
