= Vic Leadbetter =

England international rugby union player

- Full name: Victor Hamilton Leadbetter
- Born: 14 February 1930 (age 96) Kettering, England
- University: University of Cambridge

Rugby union career
- Position: No. 8
International career
| Years | Team | Apps | (Points) |
| 1954 | England | 2 | (0) |

Victor Hamilton Leadbetter (born 14 February 1930) was an English former international rugby union player.

Born in Kettering, Leadbetter was a two-time Cambridge rugby blue and gained an England call up in 1954, via Edinburgh Wanderers. He replaced former captain John Kendall-Carpenter in the line up and was capped twice, playing away Five Nations fixtures against Scotland and France. During the 1960s, Leadbetter played his rugby for Clifton.

== See also ==
- List of England national rugby union players
