= Peter Thompson (rugby union, born 1929) =

England international rugby union player (1929–2025)

- Full name: Peter Humphrey Thompson
- Born: 18 January 1929 Scarborough, England
- Died: 6 May 2025 (aged 96)
- School: Leeds Grammar School

Rugby union career
- Position: Wing
International career
Years	Team	Apps	(Points)
1956–59	England	17	(15)

Peter Humphrey Thompson (18 January 1929 – 6 May 2025) was an English international rugby union player.

== Biography ==
Thompson was born in Scarborough on 18 January 1929. He was educated at Leeds Grammar School.

A winger, Thompson played his rugby for Headingley and Waterloo.

Thompson was capped 17 times playing with England during the late 1950s. He appeared in all four of England's 1957 Five Nations matches, scoring a try against Scotland in the final fixture, to help secure a grand slam.

Thompson died on 6 May 2025, at the age of 96.

== See also ==
- List of England national rugby union players
