= Lewis Cannell =

English rugby union player

- Full name: Lewis Bernard Cannell
- Born: 10 June 1926 Coventry, England
- Died: 19 March 2003 (aged 76) London, England
- School: Northampton Grammar School
- University: University of Oxford
- Occupation: Radiologist

Rugby union career
- Position: Centre
International career
Years	Team	Apps	(Points)
1948–57	England	19	(6)

Lewis Bernard Cannell (10 June 1926 – 19 March 2003) was an English international rugby union player.

== Biography ==
Born in Coventry, Cannell was a Northampton Grammar School product and studied at Lincoln College, Oxford, where he won three rugby blues in varsity rugby with Oxford University RFC.

Cannell played his rugby with Combined Services while serving in the Royal Air Force and made appearances for Northampton, before relocating to London to continue his medical studies at St Mary's Hospital, London.

A centre, Cannell gained 19 England caps, debuting aged 21 against France in 1948. He scored the only try of England's win over Wales during their 1953 Five Nations-winning campaign and featured twice in their 1957 Five Nations grand slam success. Over the course of his career, Cannell made representative appearances for Barbarians, London Counties, East Midlands and Middlesex.

Cannell worked as a radiologist at Addington Hospital in Durban, South Africa, then on his return to England was based in Stoke Mandeville Hospital.

Cannell died of heart disease in 2003. He was survived by his wife Audrey and his son Mark from his first marriage to Winnie Baars.

== See also ==
- List of England national rugby union players
