= Lionel Oakley =

England international rugby union player

Lionel Frederick Lightbown 'Leo' Oakley (24 January 1926 - November 1981 (aged 54–55)) was an English rugby union footballer. Educated at Bedford School, he gained one cap for England in 1951, during the 1951 Home Nations Championship, as a centre, in Swansea, against Wales.
