= Roundhay School =

School in Leeds, West Yorkshire, England

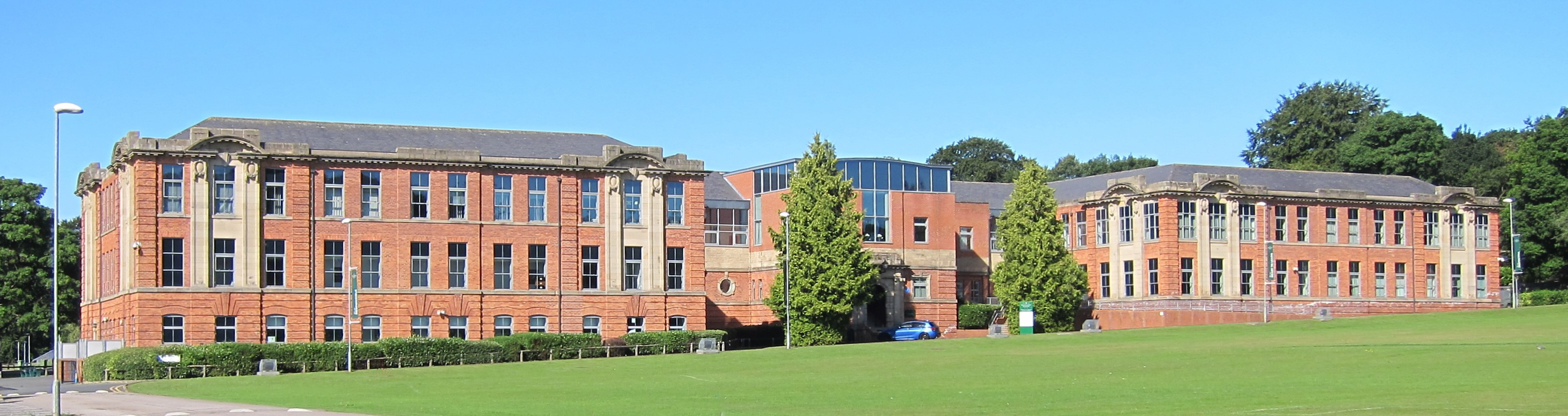
- Roundhay School from Old Park Road

Location
- Old Park Road; Leeds, West Yorkshire, LS8 1ND; England; 53.830640°N 1.510637°W

Information
- Type: Originally a private school, now a Community school
- Motto: We are Responsible, We are Resilient, We are Ready to Learn, We are Roundhay (Current) Courtesy, Cooperation, Commitment Virtutem Petamus (old Boys' school) Vouloir c’est pouvoir (old Girls' school)
- Established: 1903; 1972 (merger)
- Local authority: City of Leeds
- Department for Education URN: 108076 Tables
- Ofsted: Reports
- Head Teacher: Matthew Partington
- Staff: 120
- Gender: Mixed
- Age: 4 to 18
- Enrolment: 2500
- Colours: Green and white
- Website: http://www.roundhayschool.org.uk

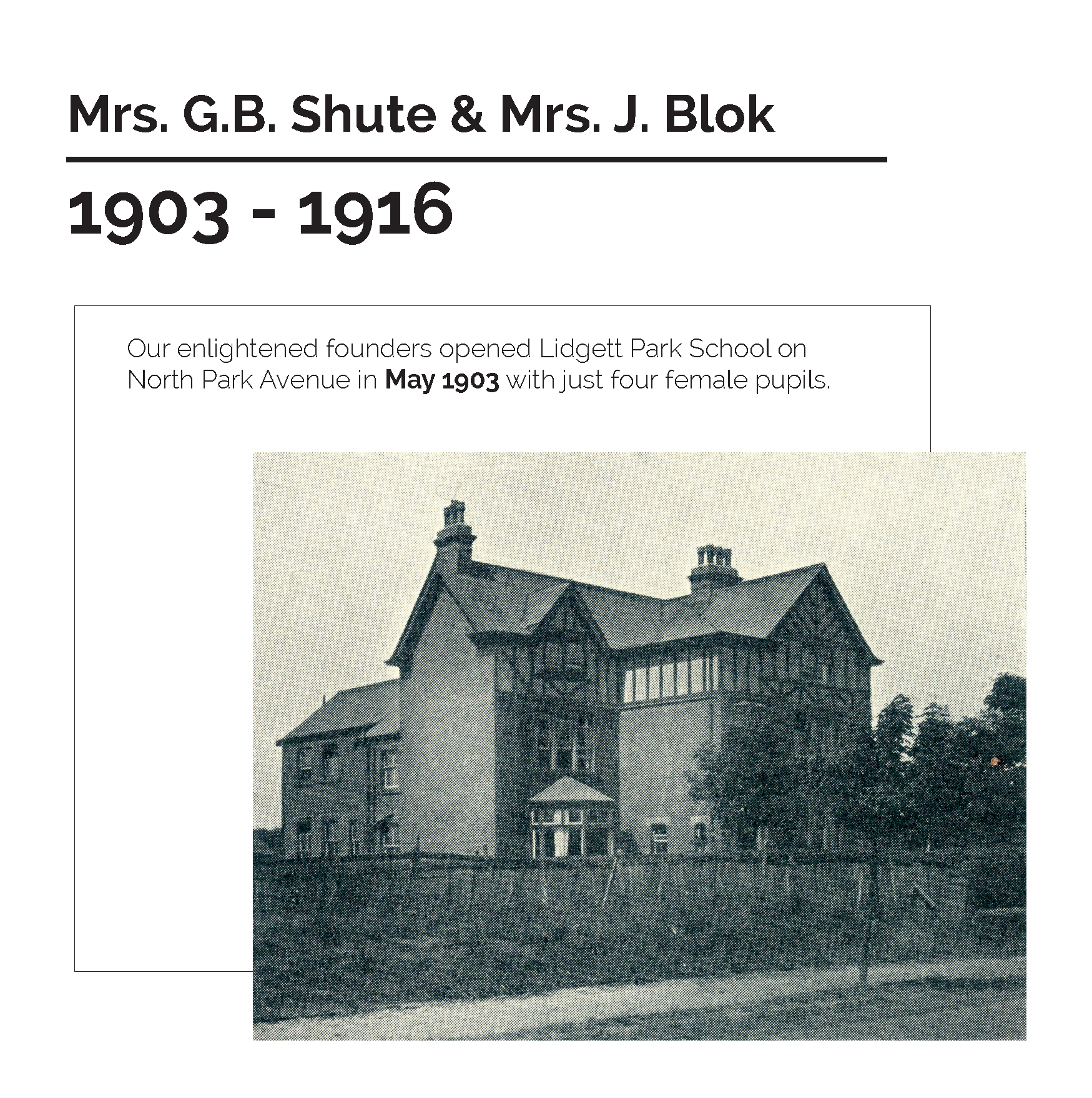
1903 Original building – Lidgett Park School for Girls, Roundhay

Comparison of the school frontage before and after the new build

Roundhay School is a mixed, all-through and sixth form community school in Roundhay, Leeds, West Yorkshire, England. In 2020, the school received a World Class Schools Quality Mark, which requires an 'Outstanding' Ofsted assessment as well as further assessments.

It has 2,600 pupils, with 500 in the sixth form. Opposite Soldiers Field in Roundhay Park, the school grounds are 22 acres (8.9 ha).

== History ==
=== Private school beginnings: 1903–1916 ===
Roundhay School came into being in 1903. It was founded by two former governesses: a Dutch woman, Johanna Gerardina Blok (1866–1940) and Georgina Bent Shute (1862–1946). They established their fee-paying private school, Lidgett Park School for Girls in a building on North Park Avenue. The school remained a private institution until "Leeds City Council took over" in 1919.

In 1903, four girls were enrolled at the North Park Avenue site. Numbers grew steadily and by September 1916, 64 pupils were on the roll. It was at this point that a former teacher at the school, Marion Christina Vyvyan (1882–1939) was asked to return, by Blok and Shute, to become the new headmistress. One of Vyvyan's first acts was to rename the school Lidgett Park High School, though the school colours and the school motto (Vouloir c’est pouvoir) were kept.

=== 1916–1925 ===
The school continued to grow under Vyvyan's leadership and in spring 1917 they took ownership of the tennis courts on Shaftesbury Avenue. Further to this, and unable to sidestep a challenge, the school absorbed a school located at 29 Shaftesbury Avenue (next to the tennis courts) from Miss Crabtree and also took on St George's Boys' School due to the illness of its headmaster, Mr Davies. This meant that by September 1917 the school had 99 girls on roll (the nucleus of what is to become Roundhay High School for Girls) and a new boys department (based at 29 Shaftesbury Avenue) with 20 boys (the nucleus of what is to become Roundhay School). The school continued to progress over the next few years and by the end of 1918 (with 128 girls on roll) it was clear that a next decisive step was needed. To this point, the school had been dependent entirely on private enterprise but now Vyvyan wanted the school to come under local authority control. James Graham, the director of education for Leeds, eventually agreed and in September 1919, Lidgett Park High School became Roundhay High School for Girls and a maintained school.

In 1920, the school absorbed St Ronan's school and consequently, the school numbers were such that new accommodation was needed. Through consultation with Graham, the Gledhow Hill Estate was purchased and in September 1921 the school moved into its new building, a building that still exists at Roundhay School, known by all as 'the Mansion'. The Mansion was separated into two sections, one for the girls and one for the boys, though the Lidgett Park site was maintained for younger children in the form of a preparatory department. Gerald Hinchliffe (1900–1993) and John Nind (1896–1926) were appointed to teach the boys whilst Vyvyan and her staff continued to educate the girls. By this point the school had a total of about 260 pupils; 155 in the girls' school, 70 in the boys' department and 35 in the preparatory department. By September 1922, this number had risen to 300 and the number of boys was also increasing. It was therefore decided that a boys' school needed to be created. With this in mind Benjamin A. Farrow (1886–1951) was appointed as headmaster, beginning in January 1923. Although taking charge of Roundhay School for Boys, Farrow immediately changed the name to Roundhay School. Against much parental protest the school was temporarily moved to the early 19th century Potternewton Mansion. On the same day that the boys entered Potternewton Mansion, the first steps were taken in the building of the new school on the Gledhow Hill estate which stood for the next 80 years on the site of the current Roundhay School building.

=== 1925–1945 ===
By September 1925, some of the boys (juniors) were transferred from Potternewton Mansion into the new building. The transfer was completed in January 1926 when the seniors joined them in the new building. In total 279 boys were on roll. The new building was officially opened on 25 June 1926 by Lord Percy, president of the board of education. Both Roundhay School and Roundhay High School for Girls continued to grow over the next 5 years. By the late 1920s, it was clear that the girls' school was going to need new accommodation. Temporary army huts were used from 1929 but by 1931 a new, permanent building was constructed at the Thorn Lane/Jackson Avenue end of the Gledhow Hill estate. The girls moved in at the start of the 1931 academic year and the building was officially opened on 25 November 1932, by which time the girls' school had 417 on roll and the boys' school had 579.

In 1936, owing in large part to ill health, Vyvyan retired as headmistress and was replaced by Hilda Nixon (1894–1980). The direction of the girls' School was maintained and numbers continued to grow. The boys' school also continued to grow and by the outbreak of war there were around 600 pupils on roll. The boys' school was evacuated in 1939 to Lincoln, though not all the boys went, whereas the girls were evacuated only as far as Otley. In the boys' case the evacuation was hugely unsuccessful and Roundhay School reopened its doors in January 1940, much to the delight of the vast majority of the boys. Numbers continued to grow throughout the war and by 1945 Roundhay School had just under 1000 boys to educate.

At least 890 old boys of Roundhay served in the Second World War, in all the different divisions. Of these, 88 were killed in action, including Leeds' only Victoria Cross from the war, Arthur Louis Aaron. One master, William E Bridges was also killed in active service. Old Boys who lost their lives in the war are commemorated on a memorial board which to this day is on the wall of the main school hall.

=== Post war-1972 ===
The Education Act 1944, which was enacted after the war had ended, ushered in the next chapter of Roundhay's history. Fees were scrapped, the leaving age was raised to 15 and both boys and girls would now need to pass the 11-plus in order to get into their respective schools (grammar schools).

In 1949, Farrow was forced into retirement by ill health, dying 2 years later in 1951. GG Hall (1897–1971), one of the original teachers in the boys' school and second master, became acting headmaster for a term until Ernest Howarth (1902–1962) arrived, having been headmaster at Scunthorpe Grammar School previously. Both schools now went through a period of relative calm and stability. Nixon remained headmistress of the girls' school until she retired in 1958, at which point she became very active in the International Vegetarian Union (IVU) until her death in 1980. She was replaced as headmistress by M R Lee (1921–2013) who remained headmistress of the girls' school until 1972. Howarth, universally feared by the boys under his care, died whilst head during the Christmas holidays in 1962. He was replaced by GG Hall until the end of the academic year, but upon his retirement Clifford Glover (1923–2015) took up the post as headmaster.

During the 1960s that many stalwarts of the boys' school started to retire. GG Hall retired in 1963 after 40 years of service to school. This was shortly followed by Hinchliffe in 1965, retiring as deputy headmaster having spent 44 years teaching the boys of Roundhay School. His replacement as deputy headmaster was Doug Morris, a former Roundhay pupil, head boy and cricket captain, who remained deputy headmaster until 1983 when he retired. Finally, in 1969, Clifford Keightley retired.

=== 1972–1992 ===
In 1972, the boys' and girls' schools merged to form a mixed comprehensive for 13- to 18-year-olds (pupils no longer needed to pass the 11 plus to get into the school). The school had just under 1400 pupils with around 360 pupils in each year group. Glover became the headteacher of the combined school and Lee (along with Morris) became his deputies. The merging of the two schools into one large comprehensive was not without its challenges but staff were determined for it to succeed. In 1972, Ian Rothbury joined the school as a teacher of geography, staying for the next 37 years, 23 of which he was the deputy headteacher. In 1977, Lee retired and was replaced by Terry Elliot as deputy headteacher. Her retirement was followed in 1980 by the retirement of Glover and the appointment of Kerr Mackie as head. John Urwin became deputy, creating a school with 3 deputies. Throughout the 1980s, the school continued to improve. In 1987, both Elliot and Urwin left Roundhay and were replaced by Jean Clennell and Bryan Smith (Morris had already retired in 1983). In 1990, Kerr Mackie died prematurely and Rothbury took over as headteacher temporarily.

=== 1992–2012 ===
In 1992, schools in Leeds were once again reorganised. The middle school system that was set up in 1972 was abolished and schools, including Roundhay, became 11–18 comprehensives. Along with this structural change, David Wilson arrived as headteacher as his previous school had been closed as a result of the reorganisation. Moreover, as the school was now admitting year 7, 8 and 9 pupils, it needed more teachers. There was a significant change in staffing, so in September 1992 the school looked significantly different to how it had looked a year previously. In 1995, the school was judged to be satisfactory by Ofsted and in 1996 Wilson retired as headteacher. His replacement, Neil Clephan, was to remain at Roundhay for the next 20 years. By this time, the old girls' school was known as senior school and the old boys' school was the lower school. Teachers had to move between the two buildings to teach pupils of different ages, causing some disruption. In 1999, Ofsted returned and rated the school as good.

In 2003, Roundhay School in its current form came into existence. The old girls' school was demolished and the old boys' school was knocked down but the fascia was kept. A new school was built behind the old fascia of larger proportions. The new building was officially opened on 12 July 2004 by Evelyn de Rothschild. The vast majority of teaching took place in the new building though some sixth form subjects were still taught in the mansion. In 2007, Ofsted once again returned to Roundhay and judged the school to be outstanding. Throughout the 2000s, academic outcomes had gradually improved.

=== 2012 ===
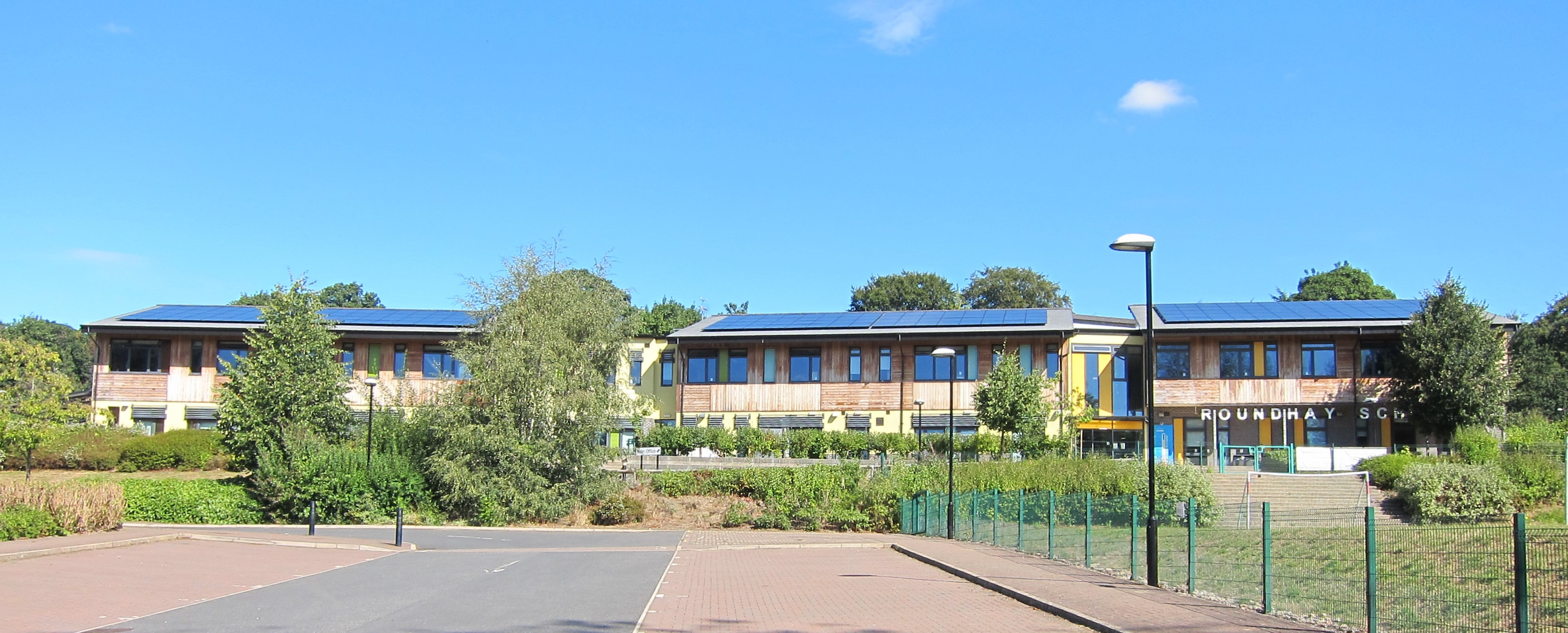
Primary Campus, from Wetherby Road

In 2012, Roundhay School once again changed and became one of the country's first 'all through schools'. A primary campus was opened about a mile away from the secondary buildings and pupils were taken into reception as a two form entry. In November 2013, Ofsted returned to Roundhay (now an all-through school) and graded it as outstanding in all areas. The inspection came off the back of Roundhay's best ever GCSE results the previous summer. It was also in the previous summer that Clennell retired as deputy headteacher after 26 years of service to the school. In 2016, Roundhay was approached by the local authority to up its intake to 300 pupils per year group in order to accommodate a local population boom. As part of this agreement, Roundhay acquired a new building, called the Pavilion, which was opened in 2017. In 2019, the primary and secondary schools converged and the first pupils from Roundhay primary school started secondary school.

== Extracurricular activities ==
Chief sports are football, rugby union, netball, cricket, and hockey, and many pupils continue to play for hockey teams after leaving school. School pupils also play in tennis and athletics competitions.

In early 2020, the school received a World Class Schools Quality Mark, which requires an 'Outstanding' Ofsted assessment as well further assessments. Furthermore, it was reaccredited in July 2022.

== Notable former pupils ==
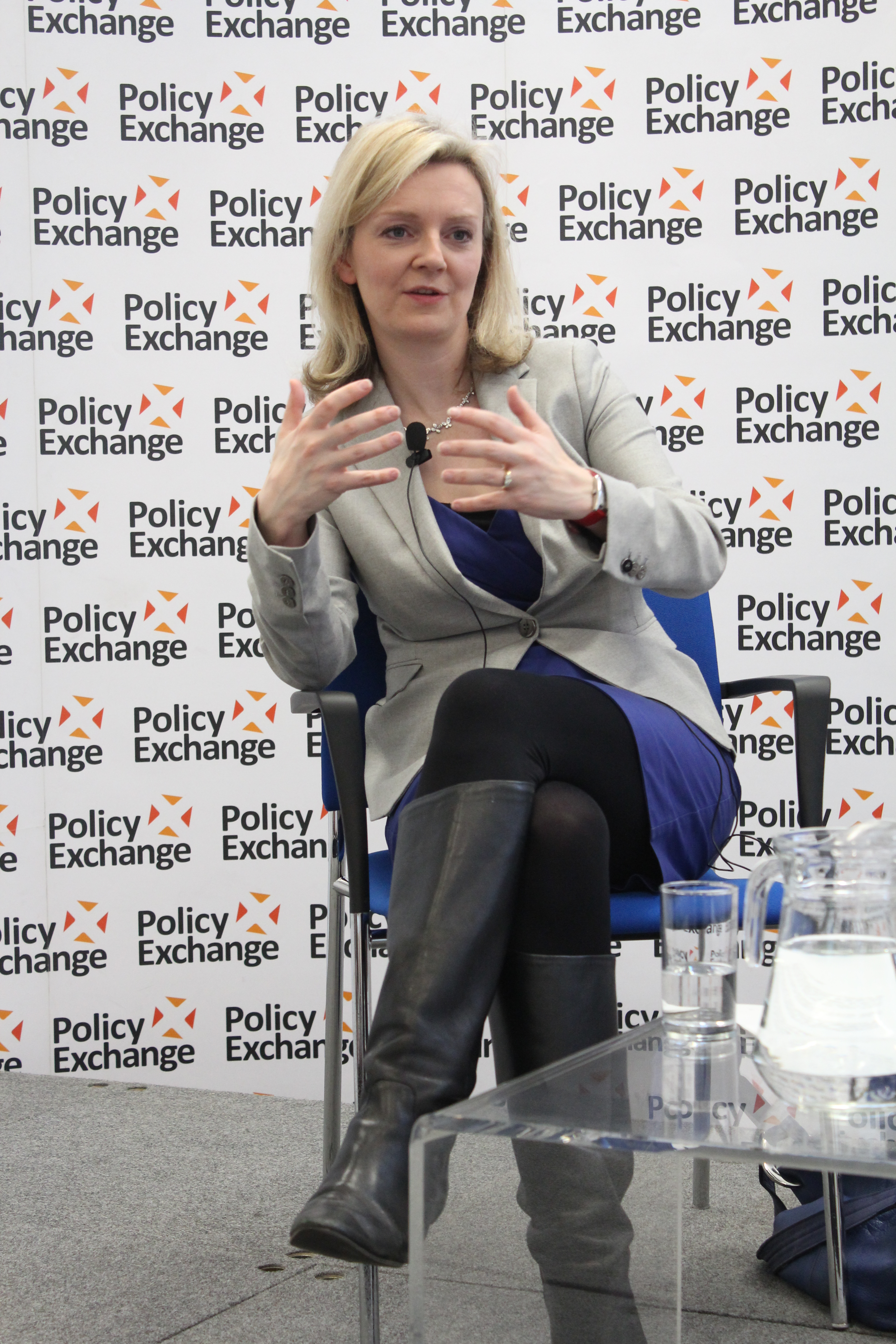
Former prime minister Liz Truss, who later said the school "let down" children

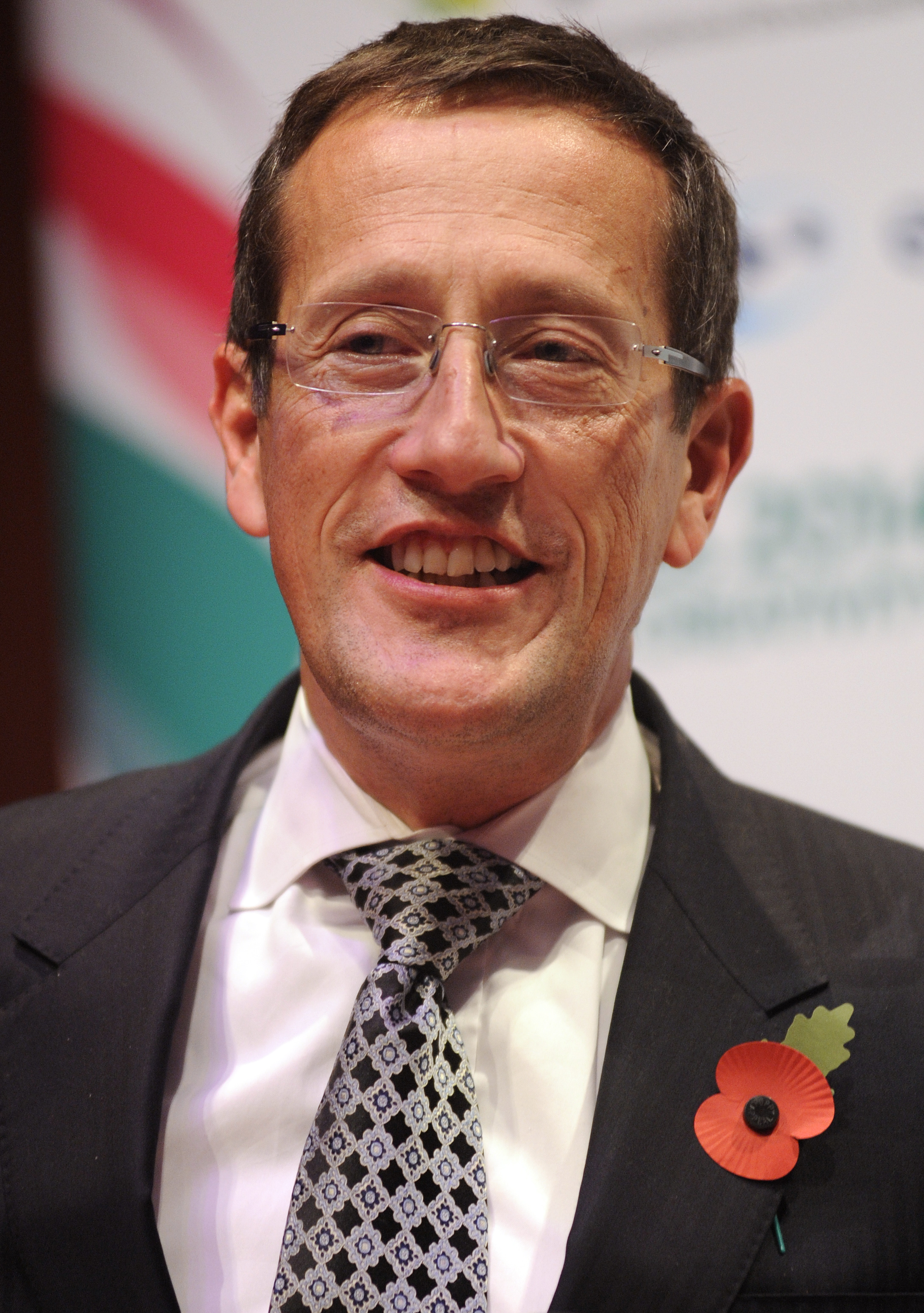
Richard Quest

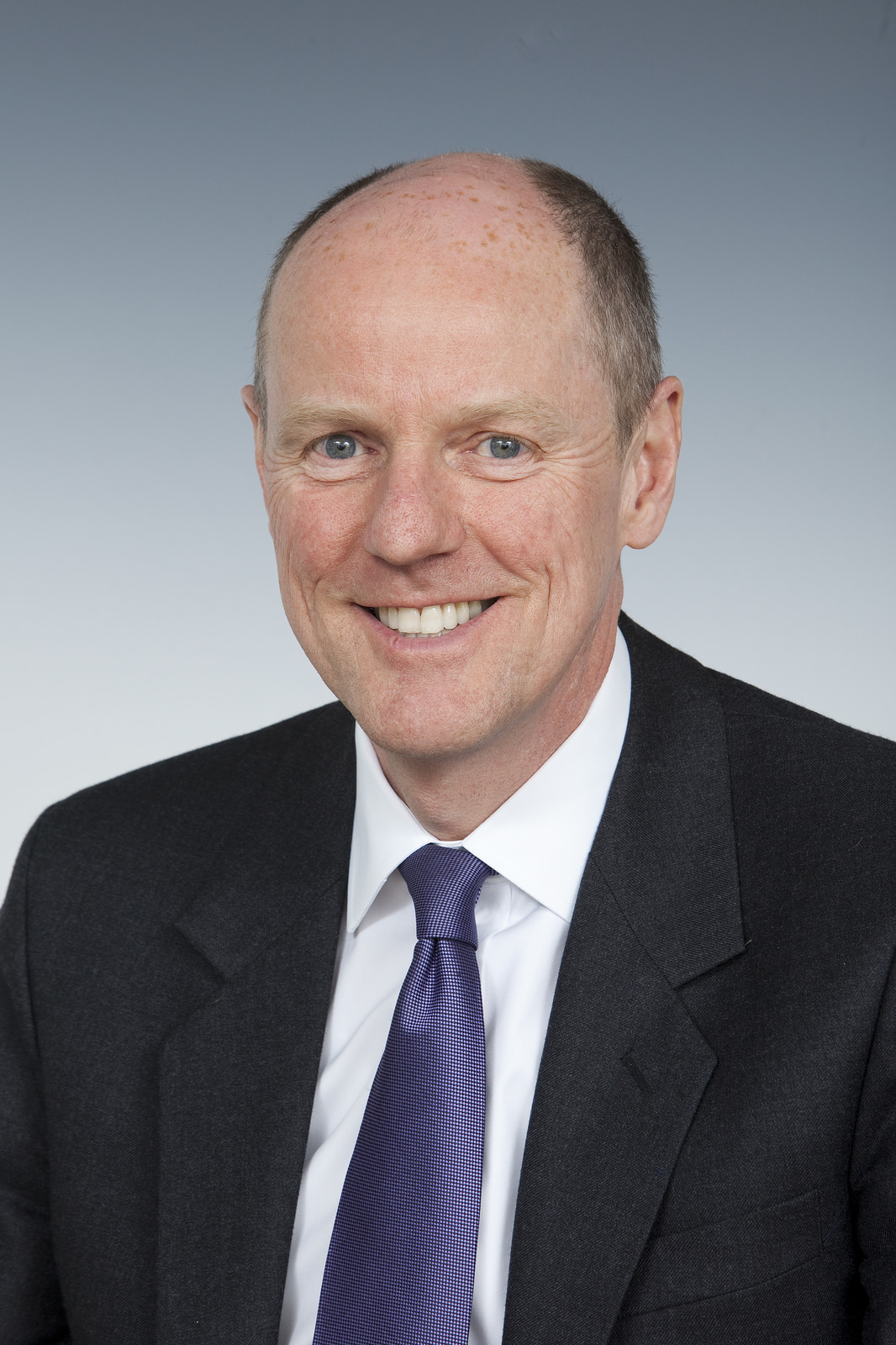
Nick Gibb

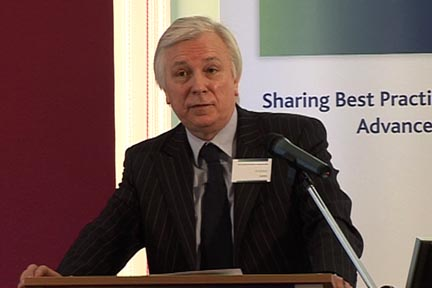
Professor Andrew Lees

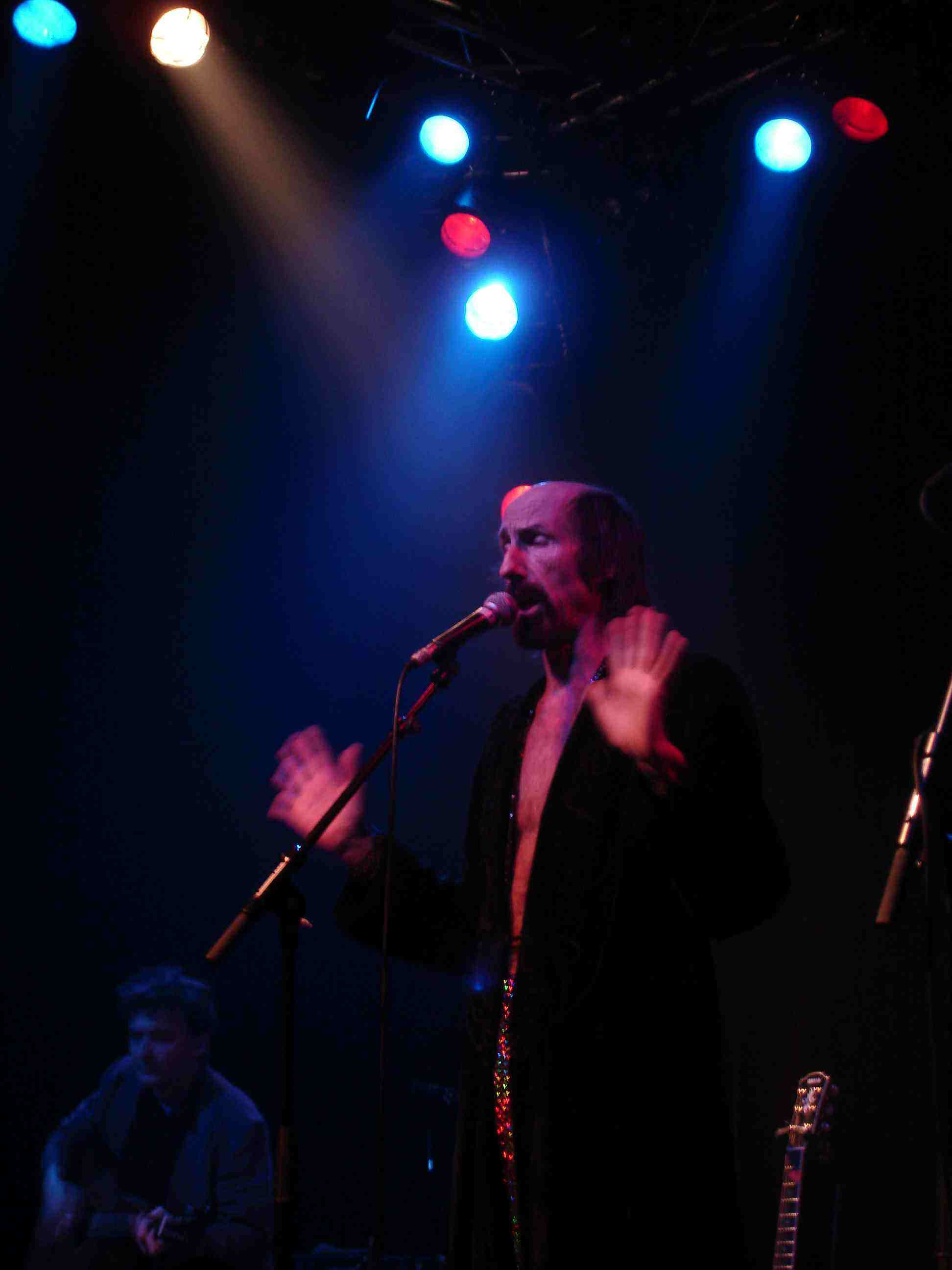
Arthur Brown

Name	Birth	Death	Notable for
The Roundhay School
Samuel Watson	-		Professional Cyclist – Ineos Grenadiers, 2025 British National Elite Road Race Champion.
Sian Breckin	1982		Actor
Arian Nik	1994		Actor and writer
Natasha Sayce-Zelem	1983		AI technologist
Tom Pidcock	1999		Professional Cyclist – Q36.5 Pro Cycling Team, 2020 & 2024 MTB XC Olympic Champion. 2023 MTB Elite XCO World Champion, 2022 Elite Cyclo-cross Champion, 2x National Elite Cyclo-cross Champion.
Paul Bennett (rower)	1988		British Rowing and Olympic gold medallist rower
Nick Gibb	1960		Conservative MP, former government minister
Zodwa Nyoni	–		playwright
Richard Quest	1962		CNN International presenter
Liz Truss	1975		Conservative MP, shortest-serving prime minister in British history
Roundhay School
Arthur Louis Aaron	1922	1943	Recipient of the Victoria Cross
John Beer (priest)	1944		Archdeacon of Cambridge from 2004 to 2014
Barrington Black	1932		Circuit Judge, 1993–2007 then Judge of Supreme Court, Gibraltar 2012–2014
Sir Geoffrey Bowman	1946		First Parliamentary Counsel from 2002 to 2006
Arthur Brown	1942		Singer of the pop hit Fire.
Derek Evans (conciliator) CBE	1942		Chief Conciliator from 1992 to 2001 at Acas
Denys Fisher	1918	2002	Inventor of Spirograph
Linal Haft	1945		Actor
Andrew Lees	1947		Francis and Renee Hock Professor of Neurology since 1998 at the Institute of Neurology at UCL
Edward Lyons	1926	2010	Labour MP
Adrian Metcalfe	1942	2021	Silver medallist in the 1964 Tokyo 4 × 400 m relay, and ITV sports commentator from 1966 to 1987
Jack Higgins	1929	2022	Pseudonym of Harry Patterson, author of The Eagle Has Landed
Geoff Raisman	1939	2017	Neuroscientist
Geoffrey Richmond	1941		Chairman of Bradford City
Michael Roll	1946		Pianist
Christopher Rowlands	1951		Chief Executive from 1993 to 1997 of HTV (now ITV Wales & West)
Philip Saffman	1931	2008	Theodore von Kármán Professor of Applied Mathematics and Aeronautics from 1995 to 2008 at the California Institute of Technology
Michael Salmon	1936		Vice Chancellor from 1992 to 1995 of Anglia Polytechnic University (Anglia Ruskin University since 2005)
Jack Shepherd	1940		Actor
Prof Irving Taylor (professor)	1944		Professor of Surgery at UCL since 1993, Professor of Surgery from 1981 to 1993 at the University of Southampton, President from 1995 to 1998 of the British Association of Surgical Oncology and from 2006 to 2008 of the European Society of Surgical Oncology
John Thompson (editor) CBE			Editor of the Sunday Telegraph from 1976 to 1986
Jon Trickett	1950		Labour MP
Prof Sir Norman Stanley Williams	1947		Professor of Surgery and Head of Centre for Academic Surgery at Barts and The London School of Medicine and Dentistry since 1986, President of Academic and Research Surgery since 2009
Arnold Ziff	1927	2004	Businessman and philanthropist
Dennis Shuttleworth	1930		Brigadier, twice capped England Scrum-Half
Roundhay High School for Girls
Name	Birth	Death	Notable for
Joyce Gould, Baroness Gould of Potternewton	1932		Labour life peer
Sylvia Kay	1936	2019	Actress
Barbara Kellerman	1949		Actress
