= Victor Tindall =

England international rugby union player & obstetrician

Victor Ronald Tindall CBE (1 August 1928 – 11 June 2010) was an English rugby union international, obstetrician and gynaecologist.

He was born in Kingsclere, Hampshire, but moved to Cheshire where he attended Wallasey Grammar School. He was a successful athlete, and played rugby for Cheshire while still at school. He studied at Liverpool University, and played for the university and for New Brighton. He also played for the Barbarians, before making four appearances as a wing for the England national team in the Five Nations Championship between January and March 1951. He later played rugby for the RAF, but his career ended prematurely after a neck injury. He continued to be involved with the sport as a referee and in an administrative capacity.

He qualified MB ChB from Liverpool in 1953, and went on to acquire a diploma in obstetrics. After completing National Service in the RAF, he returned to Liverpool University's physiology department for further training in gynaecology and obstetrics, becoming a member of the Royal College of Obstetricians and Gynaecologists (RCOG) and a fellow of the Royal College of Surgeons of Edinburgh in 1961. He later became senior vice-president of the RCOG.

He moved to Cardiff as a senior lecturer at the Welsh National School of Medicine in 1965, and in 1967 became a consultant at the University Hospital. In 1972, he moved to become professor of obstetrics and gynaecology at the Victoria University in Manchester. He maintained a gynaecological surgical practice, and retained special interests in radical pelvic surgery and in maternal mortality. He also published work on liver disease in pregnancy, and in 1987 edited the fifth edition of the textbook Principles of Gynaecology, as well as writing several other publications. He became a fellow of the Royal College of Surgeons, and was appointed CBE in 1992.

He married in 1955 and had two children. He died in 2010 at the age of 81.
