= Northampton School for Boys =

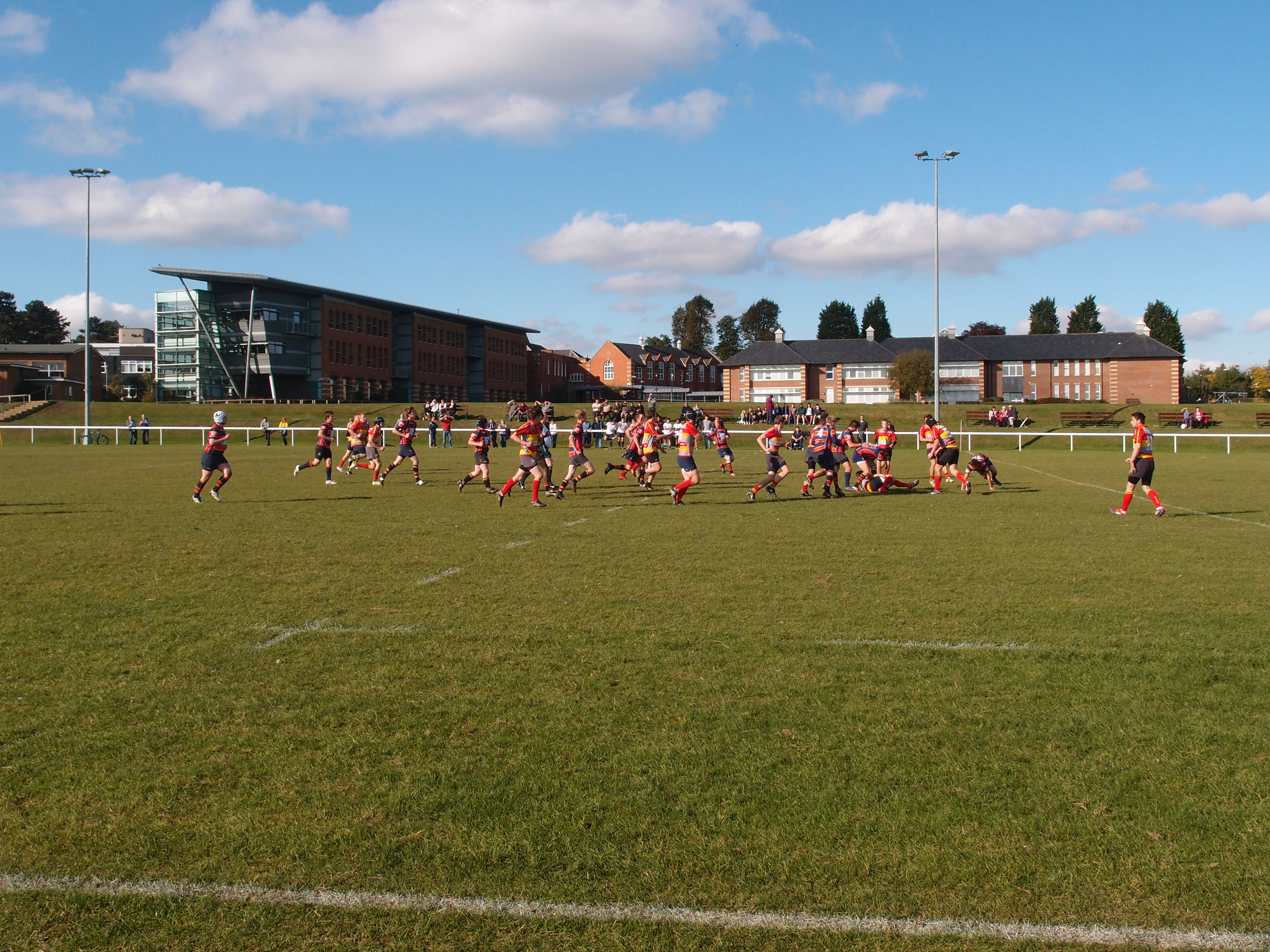
- School crest Northampton School for Boys in the background

Location
- Billing Road; Northampton, Northamptonshire, NN1 5RT; England; 52.2391°N 0.8672°W

Information
- Type: 11–18 boys Academy
- Mottoes: A Tradition of Excellence Since 1541 / An Independent Academy for the Town and County
- Established: 1541; 485 years ago
- Founder: Thomas Chipsey
- Department for Education URN: 136299 Tables
- Ofsted: Reports
- Headteacher: Richard Bernard
- Gender: Boys
- Age: 11 to 18
- Enrolment: 1528
- Houses: Brightwell, Chipsey, Manley, Washington
- Colour: Red/Blue
- Former pupils: Old Northamptonians
- Website: Northampton School for Boys

Northampton School for Boys (NSB) is an 11–18 boys secondary school in Northampton, England. It was founded as Northampton Grammar School in 1541 by Thomas Chipsey, Mayor of Northampton. Years 7 to 11 are boys-only, while sixth form classes are mixed. The school generally ranks among the best-performing in the county.

== History ==
=== Establishment ===
The school was founded in 1541 as the town's free boys grammar school on the site of the Lamb Inn on Bridge Street. Founded by mayor Thomas Chipsey, his fellow trustees included:

- Laurence Manley, Mayor from 1546-37, 1547–48, and 1557, also MP for Northampton in 1529 and 1553
- Edward Manley, Mayor from 1559–60, 1566–67, and 1574–75, also MP for Northampton in 1558
- William Brightwell
- Lawrence Washington, ancestor of George Washington, mayor in 1532 and 1545.

In 1557, the school moved to St. Gregory's church, which was adapted for its use. The School remained on this site until 1864, when it moved to the Corn Exchange in the Market Square. In 1870, additional premises were opened in Abington Square to educate a further 200 pupils. Due to its popularity, the school moved again in 1911, to new buildings constructed on the present site at Billing Road when it was known as the Town and County School.

=== Second World War ===
The boys of Willesden County School in north-west London (now Capital City Academy) and Kilburn Grammar School were evacuated to the school. The girls were evacuated to Northampton High School, England.

=== Grant maintained ===
In 1992, the school became Grant Maintained, later becoming a Foundation school. It was led for several years by Bruce Liddington, who brought the school out of a period of poor performance. It prospered as a prominent and over-subscribed school. From 1994, the school's GCSE results improved year upon year, and became the only school nationally to achieve an 11-year period of continual improvement. Liddington's success in leading the school through a turnaround earned him a knighthood and made him sought after in education strategy. Liddington would later be disgraced and resign from a chain of academy schools when he oversaw a culture of extravagant expense claims, irregularities, and trips to prestige venues funded by public money, which the Times Educational Supplement compared to corruption in US education. He was followed as headmaster by Michael Griffiths. Since 2014 Richard Bernard (Ex-OFSTED inspector) has taken over the role of headmaster.

During the 1990s, the school allowed the admission of girls into the Sixth Form. In 2007, up to a quarter of the Sixth Form could be girls, however it is now fully mixed with girls slightly outnumbering boys in the Sixth Form.

=== New buildings ===
In the summer of 1999 the school completed a new complex, Cripps Hall, named in honour of Sir Humphrey Cripps, philanthropist and Cambridge-educated former pupil of the school. It includes a theatre used for school productions and concerts as well as public performances. The building is home to the School's Expressive Arts and Modern Foreign Languages departments, as well as the theatre, drama workshop and Lounge.

During 2004, Northampton switched back to the two-tier system, once again making Northampton School for Boys a secondary school; consequently, the school had to admit pupils from the age of eleven. To cope with the increased numbers, the school for two years occupied a second campus ("Northampton School for Boys West") at the former Cliftonville Middle School—separated from the main site by St Andrew's Hospital—for the new year sevens and eights. With the completion of the RIBA award-winning new building, all pupils were located back on the main site.

=== Academy status ===
In 2010, Northampton School for Boys became an academy.

== Overview ==
=== Academic and personal attainment ===
The school has achieved recognition for its success, particularly in the areas of sport and music. Six music groups from the school achieved places in the 2009 finals of the National Festival of Music for Youth. Out of these, the Jazz Big Band won the tournament, and two other groups finished as runners-up in their categories. In November 2007 the Schools 'Jazz Vocal Group' was invited to perform at the Music for Youth Proms at the Royal Albert Hall. In December 2005 NSB was named The Daily Telegraph State School of the Year for its achievements in sport.

=== Gifted pupils ===
The school was selected to be an ambassador school for the NAGTY due to its gifted and talented programme, which was hailed as a model system by DfES.

=== Sport ===
In terms of sport, the school has had a number of its former students go into professional rugby, but many have achieved international recognition in a range of sports. Particular strengths are rugby, football, cricket, basketball, cross country, athletics and rowing, but there are also competitive fixtures in hockey, swimming, badminton and netball. Saturday fixtures are still a part of NSB life, unlike most state schools.

On 20 May 2013, the Under 13 (year 8) age group won the English School's Football Association National Cup 4-3 AET, defeating Walkwood CE Middle School, Redditch, at Chesterfield F.C.'s Proact Stadium. This marked the first Football National Cup triumph for the school, and the second final.

On 16 March 2016, the Under 15 (year 10) age group won the football National Cup, securing a 2-1 victory over football specialist school Thomas Telford School, at the Madejski Stadium, Reading.

=== School buildings ===
The centre of the school is occupied by the 1911 Building, which over the years has been extended to include an extension to the library and which is now attached to the science and technology blocks and the new (2006) building. In the summer of 1999 the school completed the Cripps Hall, named in honour of Sir Humphrey Cripps, a former pupil of the school. It includes a theatre used for school productions and concerts as well as public performances. The building is home to the School's Expressive Arts and Modern Foreign Languages departments.

Beginning in 2005, the school has had a refurbishment and building programme, called Project 465 (the school was to be 465 years old when finished, but because of building delays it was 466), which was finished in early 2007. One of the purposes of the programme was to accommodate the newly added years sevens and eights. Constructed in a post-modern style, the building features new English and mathematics classrooms, alongside two new ICT suites, a sixth form lounge (known colloquially as "The Pod") a 'restaurant/bistro' and a concourse for indoor recreation at breaktimes.

In addition, the Edward Cripps Human Performance Centre has been built which is home to a new pool, with a floor capable of raising and lowering to change the depth of the pool, a dance studio and an extension to the fitness suite, alongside a number of changing rooms. The facilities cost £4.9 million, and was opened in December 2014 by Rebecca Adlington, a former competitive swimmer.

=== Admissions ===
Northampton School for Boys is heavily oversubscribed at both age 11 and age 16 and selection criteria for admission are applied. Boys at age 11 were formerly admitted on the basis of an application form, in which parents were encouraged to make the most of their child's interests and achievements. The school now uses 3 criteria to admit pupils: (after a number of other, statutory priority places) a sibling link, an aptitude for music or technology, and finally an independently monitored fair allocation system using banding to create an equal spread of abilities. The sixth form is open to students from all schools and has an admissions number for external students of 60. Places are allocated by sitting a test, the top 60 being admitted. Each year there are approximately 550 first choice applications to join Y7 and 300 applications from students currently in Year 11 at other schools. Girls are admitted to the 6th form.

== Notable former pupils ==
Alumni are known as Old Northamptonians.

- Rotimi Segun, rugby union player for Saracens
- Glenn Middleton, football player
- Prof Martin Bennett, British Heart Foundation Professor of Cardiovascular Sciences since 2000 at the University of Cambridge
- Paul Diggin, rugby union player for Northampton Saints
- Stewart Faulkner, Olympic athlete, holder of the UK junior and under-23 indoor long jump records. Merit ranked 6th in the world by Track and Field News in 1989.
- James Grayson, rugby union player for Northampton Saints.
- Courtney Lawes, rugby union player for Northampton Saints and England
- Ollie Sleightholme, rugby union player for Northampton Saints and England.
- Matt Smith, the eleventh Doctor in Doctor Who.
- Steve Thompson, rugby union player for England

Hydrogen bonding between guanine and cytosine in DNA, discovered by Michael Creeth

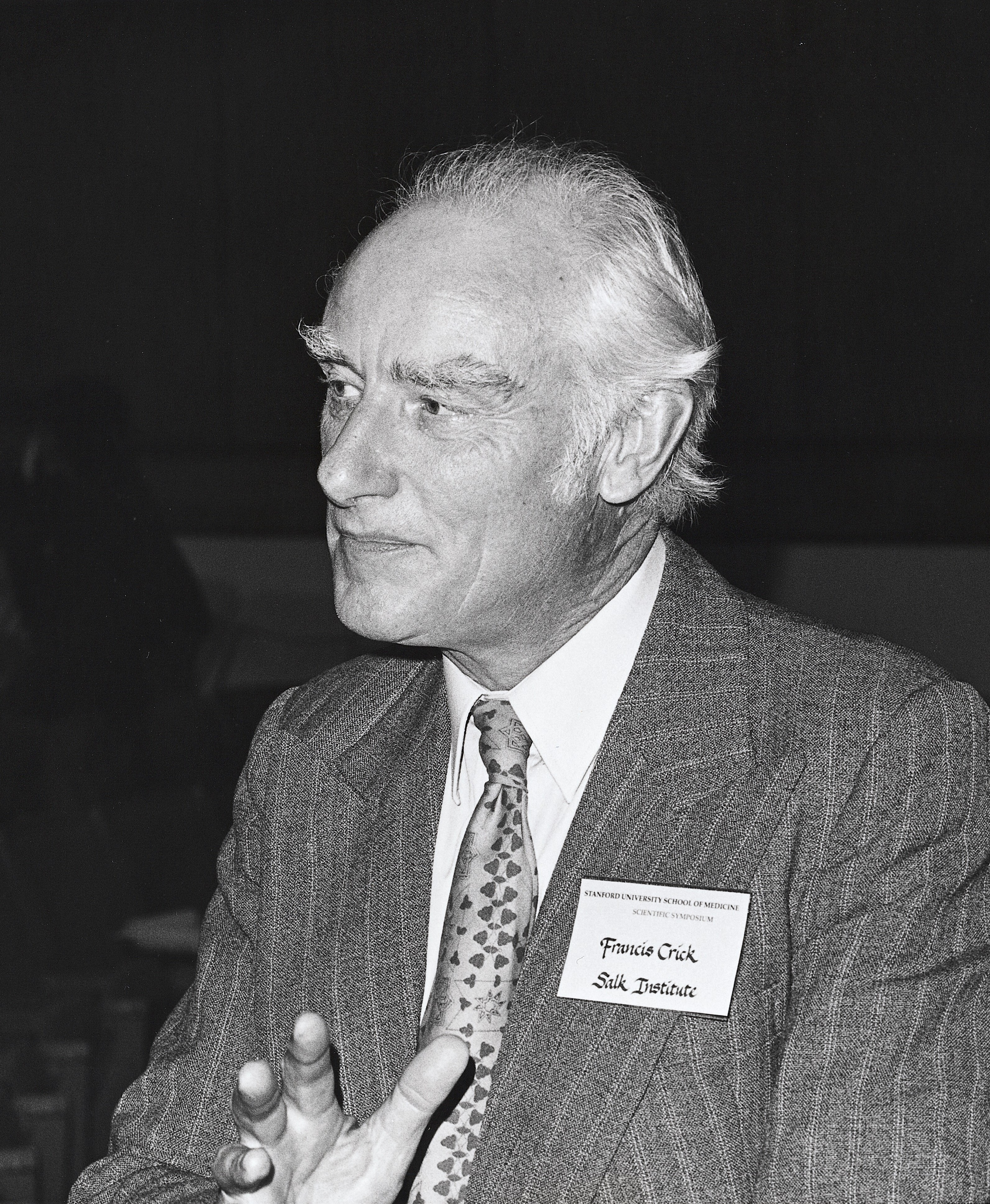
Francis Crick in 1980

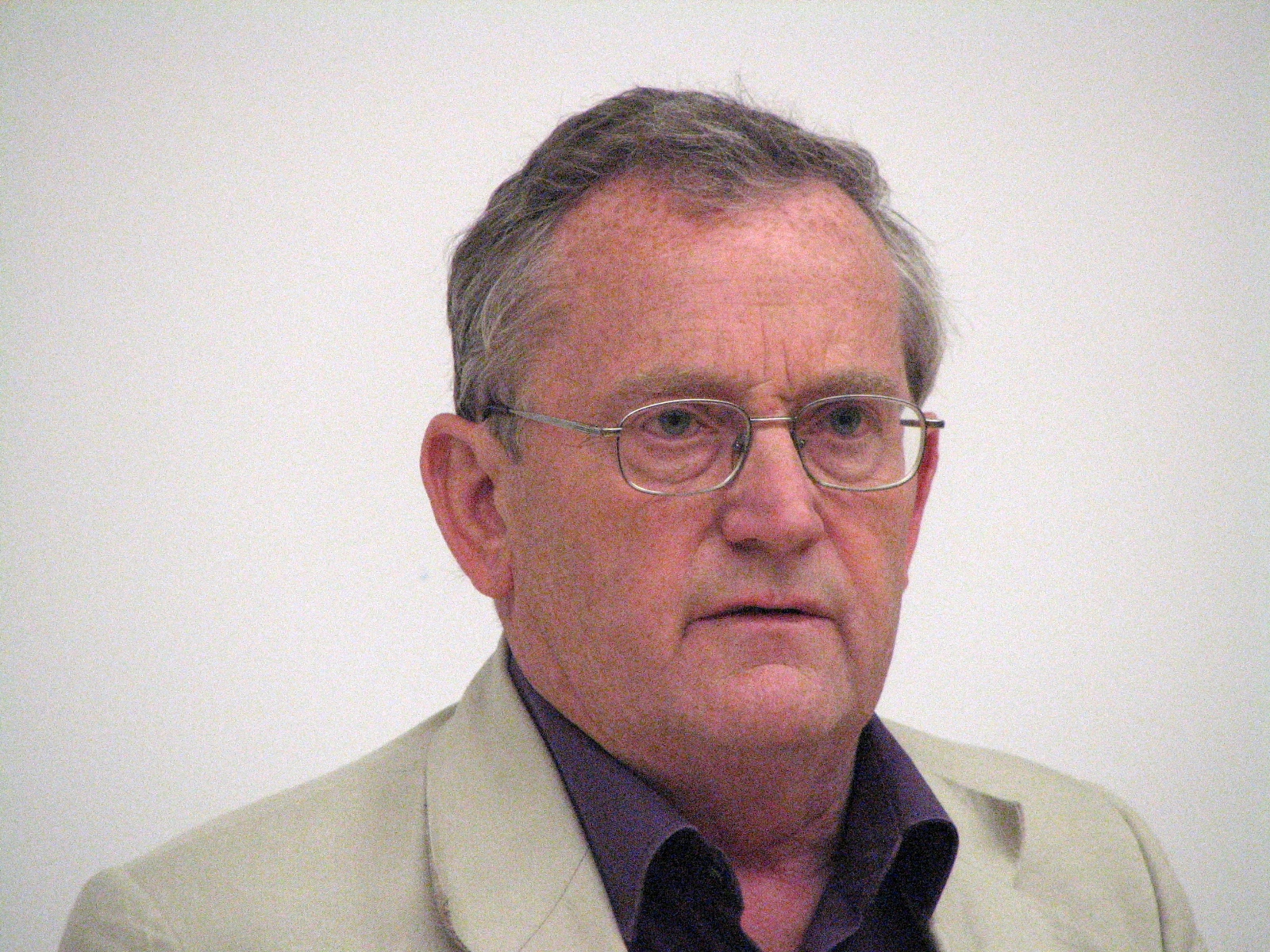
Historian Robert Service

- Jonathan Adams (British actor)
- William Alwyn CBE, composer
- Malcolm Arnold CBE, composer who spent a year at the school
- Horace Batten, rugby player and shoemaker
- John Henry Brookes OBE (attended 1902–1905), after whom Oxford Brookes University is named, being the first principal of the original college in the mid-1950s
- Thomas Cartwright (bishop), 17th century bishop.
- Tony Chater, Editor from 1974 to 1995 of the Morning Star
- Michael Creeth, biochemist whose experiments were crucial to Watson and Crick's discovery of the double helix structure of DNA.
- Francis Crick FRS, co-discoverer of the structure of DNA., and joint-winner of the 1962 Nobel Prize for Medicine
- Sir Humphrey Cripps, businessman.
- John Derbyshire, writer.
- Frank Dickens FRS a biochemist known for the pentose phosphate pathway that generates NADPH
- Bernard Donoughue, Baron Donoughue of Ashton, Advisor to Harold Wilson, Farm Minister in first Blair Government, and director from 1992 to 1997 of Towcester Racecourse
- Sir Ian Dove, judge
- Julian Druker, presenter and reporter, 5 News
- Prof Sir Hugh Ford (engineer) FRS FREng, engineer and academic
- Prof Gerald Fowler, Labour MP from 1966 to 1970 and from 1974 to 1979 for The Wrekin, and rector from 1982 to 1992 of North East London Polytechnic
- Rt Rev Richard Garrard, Bishop of Penrith from 1994 to 2001
- Ray Gosling, journalist
- Professor Roger S. Goody FRS, Biochemist, Director Emeritus, Max Planck Institute of Molecular Physiology, Dortmund, Germany and President of the German Society for Biochemistry and molecular Biology (2013–15)
- Maj-Gen Sir Stuart Greeves KBE, CB, DSO and Bar, MC
- Thomas Maxwell Harris FRS, botanist
- Sir Harwood Harrison, Conservative MP from 1951 to 1979 for Eye
- James Hervey, clergyman and writer (1720s)
- Trevor Hold, composer (1950s)
- Prof Sydney Ewart Hollingworth, Yates-Goldsmid Professor of Geology from 1946 to 1966 at University College London
- T C Ivens, Fly angler and author
- Rt Rev Graham Richard James, Bishop of Norwich since 1999
- Prof Brian F. G. Johnson, professor of inorganic chemistry from 1995 to 2005 at the University of Cambridge and Master from 1999 to 2005 of Fitzwilliam College, Cambridge
- Philip Kerr, novelist
- Rt Rev William Thomas Manning
- Arthur A. J. Marshman, architect
- Henry Mayes, tennis player
- Alan Moore, writer of dark fiction who wrote V for Vendetta and Watchmen (expelled at 17).
- Sir James Allan Park, judge
- Samuel Parker (English bishop), Bishop of Oxford
- John Preston (clergyman)
- Arthur Rubbra CBE, engineer who designed Rolls-Royce aero engines, including the Merlin and Griffon
- Jeremy Seabrook, author and journalist
- Prof Robert Service, professor of Russian history since 2002 at the University of Oxford
- Philip Sharp (Royal Navy officer) CB DSC, commanded HMS Centaur from 1962 to 1963
- Sir Alec Skempton FRS FREng, professor of civil engineering from 1957 to 1981 at Imperial College London, and president from 1957 to 1961 of the International Society of Soil Mechanics and Foundation Engineering
- Prof Harry Smith CBE FRS FRCPath, professor of microbiology from 1965 to 1988 at the University of Birmingham, who worked on anthrax in the 1950s at Porton Down
- John Charles Traylen, architect
- Robert Walker (composer)
- Tom Walls, actor
- Rt Rev David Wilcox, Bishop of Dorking from 1986 to 1995
- Gammer (Matthew Lee), English hardcore DJ

== See also ==
- Northampton High School, independent school which was established to educate the town's girls.
- Northampton School for Girls, the state girls school.
