= Ian King (rugby union) =

England international rugby union player

- Born: 5 May 1923 Leyburn, Yorkshire, England
- Died: 9 September 2002 (aged 79) Aylesbury, Bucks, England

Rugby union career
- Position: Fullback
International career
Years	Team	Apps	(Points)
1954	England	3	(5)

Ian King (5 May 1923 – 9 September 2002) was an English international rugby union player.

Born in Leyburn, King started playing with Harrogate after the war and became a regular selection for Yorkshire, as a fullback or centre. His primary position was fullback and it was in that role he gained three England caps in 1954, debuting in a win over Wales at Twickenham. In his second match, a loss to the All Blacks, King spent a period off the field injured, but retained his place for their next fixture against Ireland, kicking a penalty and conversion in an England win.

== See also ==
- List of England national rugby union players
