= Trevor Smith (rugby union) =

England international rugby union player

- Full name: Trellevyn Harvey Smith
- Born: 3 April 1920 Bedford, England
- Died: 17 October 2000 (aged 80) Kettering, England
- School: Kettering Grammar School

Rugby union career
- Position: Hooker
International career
Years	Team	Apps	(Points)
1951	England	1	(0)

Trellevyn Harvey Smith (3 April 1920 – 17 October 2000) was an English international rugby union player.

Smith was born in Bedford and raised in Northamptonshire, attending Kettering Grammar School. He served in Belgium, France, Holland and Germany during World War II. After the conflict, Smith began playing for local side Kettering, which he captained in the 1948–49 season, before crossing over to Northampton.

A hooker, Smith was an East Midlands representative and was capped for England in a 1951 Five Nations match against Wales at Swansea. He was an England reserve on several other occasions, without adding to his solitary cap.

Smith later ran a garage in Brigstock which sold and repaired farm machinery.

== See also ==
- List of England national rugby union players
