= Don White (rugby union) =

England international rugby union player

- Born: Donald Frederick White; 16 January 1926 Earls Barton, England
- Died: 21 April 2007 (aged 81) Earls Barton, England
- School: Wellingborough Grammar School
- Occupation: Businessman

Rugby union career
- Position(s): Prop, flanker
Amateur team(s)
Years	Team	Apps	(Points)
1943-1961	Northampton	448	(930)
- Correct as of 2007-06-16
International career
Years	Team	Apps	(Points)
1947 - 1953	England	14	
- Correct as of 2007-06-16
Coaching career
- Years: Team
- 1969-1971: England
- Correct as of 2007-06-16

Donald Frederick White (born 16 January 1926 in Earls Barton, England, died 21 April 2007) was an English rugby union footballer and coach. He was England's first national coach from 1969 until 1971, finishing with a record of three wins and a draw from 11 matches.

He was educated at Wellingborough Grammar School and at the age of 17 made his debut for Northampton, playing at prop. He made his Test debut for England in 1947 against Wales as flanker. He played 13 more matches for England, his last in 1953.

White became Northampton's captain in 1954 and continued in the role until he retired from rugby in 1961 at the age of 35. He had represented his club 448 times.

In 1964 he became managing director and chairman of his family's shoe business, which received a Queen's award for export achievement in 1990.

== Playing career ==
White made his first-class debut when he played for Northampton against Coventry in 1943. He was only 17 at the time and attending Wellingborough Grammar School. He had been recommended to the Northampton team by his history teacher. White said of his debut - where he played at prop - "I thought I'd get a fearful hiding, but I emerged unscathed." White continued to play for Northampton, and eventually switched from playing prop to flanker.

In 1945 White made his first appearance against a touring side when Northampton played New Zealand Services; Northampton lost 11–6. In 1947 he was selected to make his international debut for England against Wales. He collected a cross-field kick to score a try to help England win 9–3. He played for England until 1953, and made a total of 14 appearances.

He also played for a Leicestershire and Midlands Combined XV that played Australia in 1947. He also led Midlands against South Africa in 1951. He led East Midlands annually against the Barbarians, and also won the counties championship with them in 1951. He also led East Midlands to the county championship final defeats in 1950 and 1953. He again played the Australians in 1957, this time leading a Leicestershire/East Midlands side to an 18–3 defeat. His most famous counties match was when he scored Leicestershire and East Midlands' only try in a 3–3 draw with the 1960 Springboks (South Africa).

He continued to play for Northampton until his retirement in 1961, and took over as captain from 1954, and when retired had represented the club 448 times. He had scored 116 tries, 71 penalties, 183 conversions and a drop goal - totaling 930 points. He was inducted into the Northampton Saints' Hall of Fame in 2005.

== Coach and administrator ==
White was appointed as England's first-ever coach in 1969. According to former Northampton player Bob Taylor, "Don was chosen because he was the most forward-thinking coach in England". His first match in charge was an 11–8 victory over South Africa at Twickenham in 1969. Of the eleven games England played with White in charge they won three, and drew one and lost seven. He resigned as England coach in 1971, and joined Northampton's committee. He was appointed the club's honorary president for their centenary season of 1979/1980. He continued to serve on the club's committee until he was ousted in 1988.

== Personal and professional life ==
After finishing his schooling at Wellingborough Grammar School, White started working for his family's shoe business White & Co in Earls Barton. He continued working at the family business and in 1964 was appointed as its managing director and chairman. In 1990 he received the Queen's award for export achievement. He continued as the managing director and chairman until his retirement in 1996.

White was also the well respected President of Northampton Old Scouts RFC up until his death. Each April the club plays an over 30's v Under 30's game on a Saturday called the Don White Memorial Game, which is a well attended event. The Junior Sections play a large tournament again in Don White's name on the Sunday.

He was married to wife Barbara and had four children - Ian, Jill, Nick, and Sally - and nine grandchildren. He died at Earls Barton after illness, on 21 April 2007. His funeral on 4 May 2007 was attended by hundreds of mourners, including Northampton's club chairman Keith Barwell. There were so many mourners that it was necessary to set up more chairs outside the church. At the funeral, his daughter Jill said "He achieved more than most of us could in 10 lifetimes."

Preceded by	English national rugby coach 1969-1971	Succeeded by John Elders
