= Wrenn School =

Location
- London Road; Wellingborough, Northamptonshire, NN8 2DQ; England; 52°17′47″N 0°41′19″W

Information
- Type: Secondary Comprehensive Sponsor-led Academy
- Motto: "Proud to be Wrenn"
- Established: 1907: Wellingborough County High School; 1930: Wellingborough Grammar School; 1975: Merger to form Wrenn School
- Trust: Creative Education Trust: 2018
- Department for Education URN: 139961 Tables
- Ofsted: Reports
- Chair of Governors: William E Mandeville
- Principal: Laura Parker
- Gender: Coeducational
- Age: 11 to 19
- Enrolment: 1,537
- Houses: Dragons; Lion; Stag
- Colours: Black & Red
- Second Site: Doddington Road; Wellingborough; Northamptonshire; NN8 2JJ; England
- Website: www.wrennschool.org.uk

Wrenn School is a coeducational secondary comprehensive school and Sixth form with academy status, located in Wellingborough, Northamptonshire, England.

== History ==
The school's origins lie in Wellingborough County High School for girls (1907) and Wellingborough Grammar School for boys (1930). The Wellingborough County High School was founded in 1907, and moved into the Broadway site in 1911, and the grammar school site was finished in 1930, on Doddington Road. The two schools merged in 1975, under the then headmaster, Mr Wrenn, to form Wrenn School.

== Facilities ==
Wrenn School is a split-site school, with the three parts of its grounds being a short walk apart. The first site of the school is situated on the A5193 (former A509) in the south of the town, just west of the hospital, on London Road and Broadway (52.2963°N 0.6887°W). The other two sites are situated on Doddington Road (52.2959°N 0.6948°W), a few minutes from the London Road site. The Doddington Road site, formerly the boys' grammar school, houses years 7-9 along with the Art and Design Technology buildings, and the Roseacre Playing Fields site, for Physical Education, is situated directly opposite the main Doddington Road building. The London Road site, which was the site of the former girls' high school, is attended by years 10-11 and the school's Sixth Form. The oldest buildings are those of the former grammar school, and the most modern additions are the all-weather pitch (AstroTurf) and pavilion, constructed in 2004 and the music block, constructed in 2006. A new sixth form centre was completed in September 2025 on the London Road site, alongside a new SEND centre on the Doddington road site, costing approximately £1.692 million.

== Inspection judgements and academisation ==
- 1993: the school became a Grant Maintained School
- 2004: the school became a Specialist Science College
- 2009: the school's Sixth Form was rated Outstanding by OFSTED
- 2013: the school became an Academy, as part of 'The Education Fellowship Trust' .
- 2015: judgement of Requires Improvement.
- 2016: judgement of Inadequate.
- 2017: the Department for Education issued a Termination Notice to the Education Fellowship Trust in January 2017, stating that the Regional Schools Commissioner was considering terminating the academy's funding agreement. This was then confirmed in March 2017.
- 2018: judgement of Good.
- 2018: the school was transferred to the 'Creative Education Trust'.

== Academic performance ==
In 2018, the school's Progress 8 score at GCSE was average, and its Attainment 8 score below average.

== Wellingborough Music & Arts Centre ==
The Northamptonshire County Council-run “Music and Arts Centre” takes place every Saturday morning in the Wrenn School, at the London Road site, and the festival band has achieved national recognition in the finals of the national festival of music for youth.

== Notable people ==
=== Wrenn School ===
- Ashleigh Butler, entertainer and Britain's Got Talent 2012 winner along with Pudsey the Dog

=== Wellingborough Grammar School ===
- Gerry Bermingham, Labour MP from 1983-2001 for St Helens South
- Richard Bradshaw, director of the Canadian Opera Company (1998-2007)
- Michael Cox (novelist)
- Sir David Frost OBE
- Sir Bruce Liddington
- Giovanni Di Stefano, fraudster
- Sir Terence Streeton KBE CMG, High Commissioner to Bangladesh from 1983-9
- David Thacker, theatre director
- Don White (footballer), rugby player and English national coach from 1969–71

=== Former teachers ===
- Jeff Butterfield - England and Northampton rugby player
- Bob Taylor - England rugby player
