= Dennis Shuttleworth =

England international rugby union player, administrator & British Army officer

- Full name: Dennis William Shuttleworth
- Born: 22 July 1928 Leeds, England
- Died: 2 April 2001 (aged 72) York, England
- School: Roundhay School
- Occupation: Army officer

Rugby union career
- Position: Scrum-half
International career
Years	Team	Apps	(Points)
1951–53	England	2	(0)

Brigadier Dennis William Shuttleworth OBE (22 July 1928 – 2 April 2001) was a British Army officer, rugby union administrator and an England international player.

Born in Leeds, Shuttleworth attended Roundhay School and represented Yorkshire Schools in rugby. He played with several rugby clubs during his career, including the Army, Blackheath, Dover, Halifax and Headingley, while winning two England caps as a scrum-half, both against Scotland.

Shuttleworth enlisted in 1947 and saw service in Korea, Malta, Cyprus and Northern Ireland over his years in the military, for which he was made an Officer of the Order of the British Empire in the 1973 Birthday Honours.

During the 1980s, Shuttleworth served for a short period as president of the Rugby Football Union.

== See also ==
- List of England national rugby union players
