= Counties 3 Midlands East (North) =

English rugby union league

- Sport: Rugby union
- Instituted: 2006; 20 years ago (as Midlands 5 East (North))
- Number of teams: 14
- Country: England
- Holders: Boston (2nd title) (2019–20) (promoted to Midlands 3 East (North))
- Most titles: Belper, Boston (2 titles)
- Website: England RFU

Counties 3 Midlands East (North East) / (North West) (formerly Midlands 4 East (North)) are level 9 English Rugby Union leagues and level 4 of the Midlands League, made up of teams from the northern part of the East Midlands region including clubs from Derbyshire, Lincolnshire, Nottinghamshire and the occasional team from Leicestershire, with home and away matches played throughout the season. Each year some of the clubs in this division also take part in the RFU Junior Vase - a level 9-12 national competition.

Formed for the 2006–07 season, the division was originally known as Midlands 5 East (North) but changed to its present name for the 2008–09 season due to league restructuring.

Promoted teams tend to move up to Counties 2 Midlands East (North), while relegation is to Counties 4 Midlands East (West) or Counties 4 Midlands East (East).

The division was split across two geographic areas (East & West) for the 2021–22 season as part of an RFU reorganisation of the Midlands regional league. Further restructuring followed in the wake of the RFU's Adult Competition Review, with the league(s) initially known as Counties 3 Midlands East (North) East / West. From season 2023–24 a Counties 3 Midlands East (Central) was introduced before in 2024–25 the East (North) league was split North East and North West.

== 2026-27 ==
=== North East ===
Departing were Boston promoted to Counties 2 Midlands (East) North while Skegness were relegated to Counties 4 Midlands East (North East)

Team	Ground	Capacity	City/Area	Previous season
Bingham	The Pavilion		Bingham, Nottinghamshire	7th
Cleethorpes	KGV Playing Fields		Cleethorpes, Lincolnshire	8th
Gainsborough	Roses Sports Fields		Gainsborough, Lincolnshire	Relegated from Counties 2 Midlands (East) North (12th)
Grimsby	Springfield		Grimsby, Lincolnshire	5th
Market Rasen & Louth II	Willingham Road		Market Rasen, Lincolnshire	2nd
Meden Vale	Elkesley Road		Meden Vale, Nottinghamshire	Promoted from Counties 4 Midlands East (North East)
Newark II	The Rugby Ground	1,000 (60 seats)	Newark-on-Trent, Nottinghamshire	4th
North Hykeham	Ruston Sports and Bar		North Hykeham, Lincolnshire	9th
Ollerton	Boughton Sports Field		Boughton, Ollerton, Nottinghamshire	3rd
Sleaford	David Williams Pavilion		Sleaford, Lincolnshire	Relegated from Counties 2 Midlands (East) North (11th)
Southwell II	Pentelowes		Southwell, Nottinghamshire	6th

Locations of the 2026-27 Counties 3 Midlands East (North East) teams

=== North West ===
Departing were Belper promoted to Counties 2 Midlands East (North) while Castle Donington were relegated to Counties 4 Midlands East (West)

Team	Ground	Capacity	City/Area	Previous season
Ashbourne II	Recreation Ground		Ashbourne, Derbyshire	9th
Ashfield	Polly Bowls Sports Ground		Sutton in Ashfield, Nottinghamshire	11th
Bakewell Mannerians	Lady Manners School		Bakewell, Derbyshire	10th
Derby II	Haslams Lane		Derby, Derbyshire	3rd
Dronfield II	Gosforth Fields		Dronfield Woodhouse, Dronfield, Derbyshire	7th
Leesbrook	Asterdale Sports Centre		Spondon, Derby, Derbyshire	4th
East Leake	Costock Road Playing Fields		East Leake, Nottinghamshire	Promoted from Counties 4 Midlands East (West)
Long Eaton II	West Park	1,000	Long Eaton, Derbyshire	8th
Melbourne II	Cockshut Lane	2,000	Melbourne, Derbyshire	2nd
Nottinghamians	Adbolton Lane		Holme Pierrepont, Nottinghamshire	5th
Rolls-Royce	Moor Lane		Derby, Derbyshire	6th
West Bridgford II	The Memorial Ground		West Bridgford, Nottinghamshire	Relegated from Counties 2 Midlands East (North) (10th)

Locations of the 2026-27 Counties 3 Midlands East (North West) teams in Derbyshire and Nottinghamshire

== 2025–26 ==
=== North East ===
Departing were Sleaford promoted to Counties 2 Midlands (East) North.

East Retford (9th), Meden Vale (8th) and Worksop (10th) were relegated to Counties 4 Midlands East (West) while Lincoln II (11th) were relegated to Counties 4 Midlands East (East)

Team	Ground	Capacity	City/Area	Previous season
Bingham	The Pavilion		Bingham, Nottinghamshire	Level transfer from Counties 3 Midlands East (Central)
Boston	Princess Royal Sports Arena	2,000	Boston, Lincolnshire	Relegated from Counties 2 Midlands (East) North (8th)
Cleethorpes	KGV Playing Fields		Cleethorpes, Lincolnshire	5th
Grimsby	Springfield		Grimsby, Lincolnshire	3rd
Market Rasen & Louth II	Willingham Road		Market Rasen, Lincolnshire	4th
Newark II	The Rugby Ground	1,000 (60 seats)	Newark-on-Trent, Nottinghamshire	Relegated from Counties 2 Midlands (East) North (11th)
North Hykeham	Ruston Sports and Bar		North Hykeham, Lincolnshire	6th
Ollerton	Boughton Sports Field		Boughton, Ollerton, Nottinghamshire	2nd
Skegness	Wainfleet Road		Skegness, Lincolnshire	7th
Southwell II	Pentelowes		Southwell, Nottinghamshire	Level transfer from Counties 3 Midlands East (Central)

Locations of the 2025–26 Counties 3 Midlands East (North East) teams

=== North West ===
Departing were Tupton (champions), promoted to Counties 2 Midlands East (North). Amber Valley (10th), Chesterfield Panthers (8th), Mansfield II (11th) and Matlock II (9th) were all relegated to Counties 4 Midlands East (West) while Paviors II (7th) were relegated to Counties 4 Midlands East (East).

Team	Ground	Capacity	City/Area	Previous season
Ashbourne II	Recreation Ground		Ashbourne, Derbyshire	6th
Ashfield	Polly Bowls Sports Ground		Sutton in Ashfield, Nottinghamshire	Relegated from Counties 2 Midlands East (North) (12th)
Bakewell Mannerians	Lady Manners School		Bakewell, Derbyshire	5th
Belper	Strutts Playing Field		Belper, Derbyshire	2nd
Castle Donington	Spital Park Pavilion		Castle Donington, Derbyshire	Level transfer from Counties 3 Midlands East (Central)
Derby II	Haslams Lane		Derby, Derbyshire	Relegated from Counties 2 Midlands East (North) (10th)
Dronfield II	Gosforth Fields		Dronfield Woodhouse, Dronfield, Derbyshire	3rd
Leesbrook	Asterdale Sports Centre		Spondon, Derby, Derbyshire	Level transfer from Counties 3 Midlands East (Central)
Long Eaton II	West Park	1,000	Long Eaton, Derbyshire	Level transfer from Counties 3 Midlands East (Central)
Melbourne II	Cockshut Lane	2,000	Melbourne, Derbyshire	Level transfer from Counties 3 Midlands East (Central)
Nottinghamians	Adbolton Lane		Holme Pierrepont, Nottinghamshire	Level transfer from Counties 3 Midlands East (Central)
Rolls-Royce	Moor Lane		Derby, Derbyshire	4th

Locations of the 2025–26 Counties 3 Midlands East (North West) teams in Derbyshire and Nottinghamshire

== 2024–25 ==
Ahead of the new season the league was divided into two divisions, North East and North West.

=== North East ===
Departing were Mosborough promoted to Counties 2 Midlands (East) North.

Joining were Grimsby, Lincoln II, Market Rasen & Louth II, North Hykeham, Skegness and Sleaford.

Team	Ground	Capacity	City/Area	Previous season
Cleethorpes	KGV Playing Fields		Cleethorpes, Lincolnshire	8th
East Retford	Ordsall Road		Retford, Nottinghamshire	9th
Grimsby	Springfield		Grimsby, Lincolnshire	Relegated from Counties 2 Midlands (East) North
Lincoln II	Longdales Park		Lincoln, Lincolnshire	New entry
Market Rasen & Louth II	Willingham Road		Market Rasen, Lincolnshire	New entry
Meden Vale	Elkesley Road		Meden Vale, Nottinghamshire	4th
North Hykeham	Ruston Sports and Bar		North Hykeham, Lincolnshire	Level transfer from Counties 3 Midlands East (Central) (8th)
Ollerton	Boughton Sports Field		Boughton, Ollerton, Nottinghamshire	7th
Skegness	Wainfleet Road		Skegness, Lincolnshire	Re-entry
Sleaford	David Williams Pavilion		Sleaford, Lincolnshire	Level transfer from Counties 3 Midlands East (Central) (3rd)
Worksop	Stubbing Lane		Worksop, Nottinghamshire	11th

Locations of the 2024–25 Counties 3 Midlands East (North East) teams

=== North West ===
Joining were Ashbourne II, Belper, Paviors II and Rolls-Royce

Team	Ground	Capacity	City/Area	Previous season
Amber Valley	Lower Somercotes		Alfreton, Derbyshire	12th
Ashbourne II	Recreation Ground		Ashbourne, Derbyshire	Level transfer from Counties 3 Midlands East (Central) (10th)
Bakewell Mannerians	Lady Manners School		Bakewell, Derbyshire	3rd
Belper	Strutts Playing Field		Belper, Derbyshire	Relegated from Counties 2 Midlands (East) North
Chesterfield Panthers	Dunston Road	2,000	Chesterfield, Derbyshire	5th
Dronfield II	Gosforth Fields		Dronfield Woodhouse, Dronfield, Derbyshire	10th
Mansfield II	Eakring Road	1,000	Mansfield, Nottinghamshire	New entry
Matlock II	Cromford Meadows		Cromford, Matlock, Derbyshire	6th
Paviors II	The Ron Rossin Ground		Nottingham, Nottinghamshire	Level transfer from Counties 3 Midlands East (Central) (5th)
Rolls-Royce	Moor Lane		Derby, Derbyshire	Level transfer from Counties 3 Midlands East (Central) (7th)
Tupton	North Side		Tupton, Derbyshire	2nd

Locations of the 2024–25 Counties 3 Midlands East (North West) teams in Derbyshire and Nottinghamshire

== 2023–24 ==
Departing from the East league were Newark II and from the West, Departing were Derby II, both promoted to Counties 2 Midlands (East) North. Nottingham Medics (3rd) withdrew from the league.

Moving on a level transfer to the newly formed Counties 3 Midlands East (Central) from the East league were North Hykeham, Nottinghamians, Paviors II, Sleaford and Southwell II; and from the West were Ashbourne II, Keyworth, Long Eaton II, Melbourne II, Rolls-Royce and West Bridgford II.

Joining were Mosborough, Bakewell Mannerians and East Retford.

Team	Ground	Capacity	City/Area	Previous season
Amber Valley	Lower Somercotes		Alfreton, Derbyshire	12th (West)
Bakewell Mannerians	Lady Manners School		Bakewell, Derbyshire	Relegated from Counties 2 Midlands (East) North
Chesterfield Panthers	Dunston Road	2,000	Chesterfield, Derbyshire	4th (West)
Cleethorpes	KGV Playing Fields		Cleethorpes, Lincolnshire	11th (East)
Dronfield II	Gosforth Fields		Dronfield Woodhouse, Dronfield, Derbyshire	9th (West)
East Retford	Ordsall Road		Retford, Nottinghamshire	Relegated from Counties 2 Midlands (East) North
Matlock II	Cromford Meadows		Cromford, Matlock, Derbyshire	6th (West)
Meden Vale	Elkesley Road		Meden Vale, Nottinghamshire	2nd (East)
Mosborough	Mosborough Miners Welfare Club		Mosborough, Sheffield, South Yorkshire	Level transfer from Counties 4 Yorkshire (4th)
Ollerton	Boughton Sports Field		Boughton, Ollerton, Nottinghamshire	9th (East)
Tupton	North Side		Tupton, Derbyshire	3rd (West)
Worksop	Stubbing Lane		Worksop, Nottinghamshire	10th (East)

Locations of the 2023–24 Counties 3 Midlands East (North) East teams

== 2022–23 ==
This was the first season following the RFU Adult Competition Review with the league adopting its new name(s) of Counties 3 Midlands West (North) East / West.

=== East ===
Departing were Gainsborough, promoted to Counties 2 Midlands (East) North.

Joining were Meden Vale, Newark II, Nottinghamians, Nottingham Medics, Paviors II and Southwell II .

Team	Ground	Capacity	City/Area	Previous season
Cleethorpes	KGV Playing Fields		Cleethorpes, Lincolnshire	3rd
Meden Vale	Elkesley Road		Meden Vale, Nottinghamshire	Level transfer from Midlands 4 East (North) West (runners-up)
Newark II	The Rugby Ground	1,000 (60 seats)	Newark-on-Trent, Nottinghamshire	New entry
North Hykeham	Ruston Sports and Bar		North Hykeham, Lincolnshire	4th
Nottinghamians	Adbolton Lane		Holme Pierrepont, Nottinghamshire	Level transfer from Midlands 4 East (North) West (5th)
Nottingham Medics	Weir Field Recreation Ground		Beeston, Nottingham, Nottinghamshire	
Ollerton	Boughton Sports Field		Boughton, Ollerton, Nottinghamshire	5th
Paviors II	The Ron Rossin Ground		Nottingham, Nottinghamshire	New entry
Sleaford	David Williams Pavilion		Sleaford, Lincolnshire	2nd
Southwell II	Pentelowes		Southwell, Nottinghamshire	New entry
Worksop	Stubbing Lane		Worksop, Nottinghamshire	6th

Locations of the 2022–23 Counties 3 Midlands East (North) East teams

=== West ===
Departing were Nottingham Moderns, promoted to Counties 2 Midlands (East) North.

Joining were Ashbourne II, Derby II, Dronfield II, Keyworth, Long Eaton II, Matlock II, Melbourne II and West Bridgford II.

Team	Ground	Capacity	City/Area	Previous season
Amber Valley	Lower Somercotes		Alfreton, Derbyshire	6th
Ashbourne II	Recreation Ground		Ashbourne, Derbyshire	New entry
Chesterfield Panthers	Dunston Road	2,000	Chesterfield, Derbyshire	3rd
Derby II	Haslams Lane		Derby, Derbyshire	New entry
Dronfield II	Gosforth Fields		Dronfield Woodhouse, Dronfield, Derbyshire	New entry
Keyworth	Willoughby Road		Widmerpool, Nottinghamshire	Re-entry
Long Eaton II	West Park	1,000	Long Eaton, Derbyshire	New entry
Matlock II	Cromford Meadows		Cromford, Matlock, Derbyshire	New entry
Melbourne II	Cockshut Lane	2,000	Melbourne, Derbyshire	New entry
Rolls-Royce	Moor Lane		Derby, Derbyshire	7th
Tupton	North Side		Tupton, Derbyshire	4th
West Bridgford II	The Memorial Ground		West Bridgford, Nottinghamshire	New entry

Locations of the 2022–23 Counties 3 Midlands East (North) West teams

== 2021–22 ==
Skegness, who finished 12th in 2019–20, were placed in the East division for the current season but were unable to fulfil their fixtures and subsequently withdrew from the league.

The teams competing in 2021–22 achieved their places in the league based on performances in 2019–20, the positions in brackets refer to that season not 2020–21.

=== East ===
Team	Ground	Capacity	City/Area	Previous season
Cleethorpes	KGV Playing Fields		Cleethorpes, Lincolnshire	3rd
Gainsborough	Roses Sports Fields		Gainsborough, Lincolnshire	6th
North Hykeham	Ruston Sports and Bar		North Hykeham, Lincolnshire	10th
Ollerton	Boughton Sports Field		Boughton, Ollerton, Nottinghamshire	9th
Sleaford	David Williams Pavilion		Sleaford, Lincolnshire	4th
Worksop	Stubbing Lane		Worksop, Nottinghamshire	14th

Locations of the 2021–22 Midlands 4 East (North) East teams

=== West ===
Team	Ground	Capacity	City/Area	Previous season
Amber Valley	Lower Somercotes		Alfreton, Derbyshire	13th
Chesterfield Panthers	Dunston Road	2,000	Chesterfield, Derbyshire	7th
Meden Vale	Elkesley Road		Meden Vale, Nottinghamshire	5th
Nottinghamians	Adbolton Lane		Holme Pierrepont, Nottinghamshire	11th
Nottingham Moderns	Ferryfields		Wilford, Nottingham, Nottinghamshire	Relegated from Midlands 3 EN (11th)
Rolls-Royce	Moor Lane		Derby, Derbyshire	Relegated from Midlands 3 EN (12th)
Tupton	North Side		Tupton, Derbyshire	8th

Locations of the 2021–22 Midlands 4 East (North) West teams

== 2020–21 ==
Due to the COVID-19 pandemic, the 2020–21 season was cancelled.

== 2019–20 ==
=== Participating teams & locations ===
Team	Ground	Capacity	City/Area	Previous season
Amber Valley	Lower Somercotes		Alfreton, Derbyshire	14th
Boston	Princess Royal Sports Arena	2,000	Boston, Lincolnshire	5th
Chesterfield Panthers	Dunston Road	2,000	Chesterfield, Derbyshire	8th
Cleethorpes	KGV Playing Fields		Cleethorpes, Lincolnshire	3rd
East Retford	Ordsall Road		Retford, Nottinghamshire	4th
Gainsborough	Roses Sports Fields		Gainsborough, Lincolnshire	13th
Meden Vale	Elkesley Road		Meden Vale, Nottinghamshire	11th
North Hykeham	Ruston Sports and Bar		North Hykeham, Lincolnshire	6th
Nottinghamians	Adbolton Lane		Holme Pierrepont, Nottinghamshire	12th
Ollerton	Boughton Sports Field		Boughton, Ollerton, Nottinghamshire	7th
Skegness	Wainfleet Road		Skegness, Lincolnshire	10th
Sleaford	David Williams Pavilion		Sleaford, Lincolnshire	Relegated from Midlands 3 EN (11th)
Tupton	North Side		Tupton, Derbyshire	Relegated from Midlands 3 EN (12th)
Worksop	Stubbing Lane		Worksop, Nottinghamshire	9th

Locations of the 2019–20 Midlands 4 East (North) teams

== 2018–19 ==
=== Participating teams & locations ===
Team	Ground	Capacity	City/Area	Previous season
Amber Valley	Lower Somercotes		Alfreton, Derbyshire	Promoted from Midlands 5 East (North) (3rd)
Boston	Princess Royal Sports Arena	2,000	Boston, Lincolnshire	9th
Chesterfield Panthers	Dunston Road	2,000	Chesterfield, Derbyshire	4th
Cleethorpes	KGV Playing Fields		Cleethorpes, Lincolnshire	Promoted from Midlands 5 East (North) (champions)
East Retford	Ordsall Road		Retford, Nottinghamshire	3rd
Gainsborough	Roses Sports Fields		Gainsborough, Lincolnshire	Promoted from Midlands 5 East (North) (5th)
Grimsby	Springfield		Grimsby, Lincolnshire	Relegated from Midlands 3 East (North) (12th)
Meden Vale	Elkesley Road		Meden Vale, Nottinghamshire	Promoted from Midlands 5 East (North) (4th)
Mellish	War Memorial Ground		Arnold, Nottingham, Nottinghamshire	6th
North Hykeham	One NK		North Hykeham, Lincolnshire	Promoted from Midlands 5 East (North) (runners up)
Nottinghamians	Adbolton Lane		Holme Pierrepont, Nottinghamshire	Promoted from Midlands 5 East (North) (6th)
Ollerton	Boughton Sports Field		Boughton, Ollerton, Nottinghamshire	7th
Skegness	Wainfleet Road		Skegness, Lincolnshire	8th
Worksop	Stubbing Lane		Worksop, Nottinghamshire	5th

Locations of the 2018–19 Midlands 4 East (North) teams

== 2017–18 ==
=== Participating teams & locations ===
Team	Ground	Capacity	City/Area	Previous season
Ashfield	Polly Bowls Sports Ground		Sutton in Ashfield, Nottinghamshire	Relegated from Midlands 3 East (North) (11th)
Boston	Princess Royal Sports Arena	2,000	Boston, Lincolnshire	8th
Chesterfield Panthers	Dunston Road	2,000	Chesterfield, Derbyshire	Relegated from Midlands 3 East (North) (12th)
East Retford	Ordsall Road		Retford, Nottinghamshire	4th
Mellish	War Memorial Ground		Arnold, Nottingham, Nottinghamshire	3rd
Ollerton	Boughton Sports Field		Boughton, Ollerton, Nottinghamshire	6th
Skegness	Wainfleet Road		Skegness, Lincolnshire	Promoted from Midlands 5 East (North) (champions)
Tupton	North Side		Tupton, Derbyshire	5th
Worksop	Stubbing Lane		Worksop, Nottinghamshire	7th

Locations of the 2017–18 Midlands 4 East (North) teams

== Teams 2016–17 ==
- Amber Valley
- Boston (relegated from Midlands 3 East (North))
- East Retford
- Long Eaton
- Mellish
- Meden Vale (promoted from Midlands 5 East (North))
- Nottingham Moderns (relegated from Midlands 3 East (North))
- Ollerton (promoted from Midlands 5 East (North))
- Tupton
- Worksop

== Teams 2015–16 ==
- Amber Valley (relegated from Midlands 3 East (North))
- Bingham
- Birstall (promoted from Midlands 5 East (North))
- Buxton
- Cleethorpes
- East Retford
- Long Eaton
- Mellish (relegated from Midlands 3 East (North))
- North Hykeham (promoted from Midlands 5 East (North))
- Rolls-Royce
- Tupton
- Worksop

== Teams 2014–15 ==
- Ashfield
- Belper
- Bingham
- Buxton
- Cleethorpes
- East Retford (relegated from Midlands 3 East (North))
- Keyworth
- Long Eaton
- Rolls-Royce (promoted from Midlands 5 East (North))
- Skegness (relegated from Midlands 3 East (North))
- Tupton
- Worksop

== Teams 2013–14 ==
- Amber Valley (relegated from Midlands 3 East (North))
- Ashfield
- Belper (relegated from Midlands 3 East (North))
- Bingham (promoted from Midlands 5 East (North))
- Chesterfield Panthers
- Cleethorpes
- Keyworth
- Leesbrook (promoted from Midlands 5 East (North))
- Long Eaton
- Nottinghamians
- Tupton
- Worksop

== Teams 2012–13 ==
- Ashfield
- Boston
- Chesterfield Panthers
- Cleethorpes
- Horncastle
- Keyworth
- Long Eaton
- Nottinghamians
- Nottingham Corsairs
- Skegness
- Tupton
- Worksop

== Teams 2009–10 ==
- Belper (promoted from Midlands 5 East (North))
- Castle Donington (promoted from Midlands 5 East (North))
- Chesterfield Panthers
- Cleethorpes
- Dronfield
- East Leake
- East Retford
- Leesbrook
- Nottinghamians
- Rolls-Royce (promoted from Midlands 5 East (North))
- Skegness Panthers
- Uttoxeter

== Teams 2008–09 ==
- Amber Valley
- Ashby
- Ashfield
- Barton & District (promoted from Midlands 5 East (North))
- Belgrave
- Boston
- Kesteven
- Market Rasen & Louth
- Mellish
- Nottingham Casuals (promoted from Midlands 5 East (North))
- Oakham
- Southwell

== Original teams ==
When this division was introduced in 2006 as Midlands 5 East (North), it contained the following teams:

- Bakewell Mannerians - promoted from Derbyshire/North Leicestershire (champions)
- Boston - transferred from Notts, Lincs, Derbyshire/North Leicestershire (3rd)
- Dronfield - transferred from Notts, Lincs, Derbyshire/North Leicestershire (9th)
- East Leake - transferred from Notts, Lincs, Derbyshire/North Leicestershire (6th)
- Keyworth - transferred from Notts, Lincs, Derbyshire/North Leicestershire (7th)
- Long Eaton - transferred from Notts, Lincs, Derbyshire/North Leicestershire (8th)
- Nottingham Casuals - transferred from Notts, Lincs, Derbyshire/North Leicestershire (4th)
- Nottinghamians - promoted from Nottinghamshire/Lincolnshire (champions)
- University of Derby - promoted from Derbyshire/North Leicestershire (runners up)
- Worksop - transferred from Notts, Lincs, Derbyshire/North Leicestershire (5th)

== Midlands 4 East (North) honours ==
=== Midlands 5 West (North) (2006–2009) ===
League restructuring ahead of the 2006–07 season saw the introduction of Midlands 5 East (North) and its counterpart Midlands 5 East (South) at tier 9 to replace the discontinued East Midlands/South Leicestershire 1 and Notts, Lincs, Derbyshire/North Leicestershire leagues. Promotion was to Midlands 4 East (North) and relegation to either Midlands 6 East (North-East) or Midlands 6 East (North-West).

Midlands 5 East (North)
Season	No of teams	Champions	Runners-up	Relegated teams	Reference
2006–07	10	Bakewell Mannerians	Boston	Long Eaton, Worksop, Keyworth	
2007–08	10	Barton & District	Nottingham Casuals	University of Derby, Dronfield	
2008–09	10	Worksop	Melbourne	No relegation (Note: No relegation as division would increase from 10 to 12 teams for the following season.)	
Green backgrounds are promotion places.

=== Midlands 4 East (North) (2009–present) ===
Further league restructuring by the RFU meant that Midlands 5 East (North) and Midlands 5 East (South) were renamed as Midlands 4 East (North) and Midlands 4 East (South), with both leagues remaining at tier 9. Promotion was now to Midlands 3 East (North) (formerly Midlands 4 East (North)) and relegation to Midlands 5 East (North) (formerly Midlands 6 East (North)) until that league was discontinued at the end of the 2017–18 season.

Midlands 4 East (North)
Season	No. of teams	Champions	Runners-up	Relegated teams	Reference
2009–10	12	Uttoxeter	Dronfield	Castle Donington	
2010–11	11	Belper	Nottingham Corsairs	Boston	
2011–12	12	Southwell	East Retford	Leesbrook, East Leake	
2012–13	12	Boston	Skegness	Horncastle, Nottingham Corsairs	
2013–14	12	Chesterfield Panthers	Amber Valley	Nottinghamians, Leesbrook	
2014–15	12	Belper	Ashfield	Skegness, Keyworth, Bingham	
2015–16	10	Buxton	Rolls-Royce	Cleethorpes, North Hykeham	
2016–17	10	Long Eaton	Nottingham Moderns	Meden Vale, Amber Valley	
2017–18	9	Ashfield	Tupton	No relegation (Note: Due to Midlands 5 East (North) being abolished there was no relegation and Midlands 4 East (North) would increase from 9 to 14 teams for the following season.)	
2018–19	14	Grimsby	Mellish	No relegation	
2019–20	14	Boston	East Retford	No relegation	
2020–21	14			No relegation	
Green backgrounds are promotion places.

== Number of league titles ==
- Belper (2)
- Boston (2)
- Ashfield (1)
- Bakewell Mannerians (1)
- Barton & District (1)
- Buxton (1)
- Chesterfield Panthers (1)
- Grimsby (1)
- Long Eaton (1)
- Southwell (1)
- Uttoxeter (1)
- Worksop (1)

== See also ==
- Midlands RFU
- Leicestershire RU
- Notts, Lincs & Derbyshire RFU
- English rugby union system
- Rugby union in England
