= Midlands 5 East (North) =

English rugby union league

- Sport: Rugby union
- Instituted: 2006; 20 years ago (as Midlands 6 East (North-East & North-West)
- Country: England
- Holders: Cleethorpes (2nd title) (2017–18) (promoted to Midlands 4 East (North))
- Most titles: Cleethorpes (2 titles)
- Website: England RFU

Counties 4 Midlands East (North West) / (North East) (formerly Midlands 5 East (North)) are level 10 English Rugby Union leagues and level 5 of the Midlands League, made up of teams from the northern part of the East Midlands region including Derbyshire, Lincolnshire, Nottinghamshire and the occasional team from Leicestershire, with home and away matches played throughout the season.

Formed in 2006, the league was originally split into 2 regional divisions – Midlands 6 East (North-East) and Midlands 6 East (North-West) - but, by the 2009-10 season, the league merged into a single division. Promoted teams typically moved up to Midlands 4 East (North) and there is no relegation due to it being one of the basement divisions for Midlands rugby. At the end of the 2017-18 season the division was abolished with the majority of teams moving up into Midlands 4 East (North). The league was reinstated in two divisions - North West and North East - ahead of the 2025-26 season.

== 2026-27 ==
=== North West ===
Departing were Meden Vale promoted to Counties 3 Midlands East (North East)

Team	Ground	Capacity	City/Area	Previous season
Amber Valley	Lower Somercotes		Alfreton, Derbyshire	7th
Belper II	Strutts Playing Field		Belper, Derbyshire	New entry
Castle Donington	Spital Park Pavilion		Castle Donington, Derbyshire	Relegated from Counties 3 Midlands East (North West)
Chesterfield Panthers	Dunston Road	2,000	Chesterfield, Derbyshire	4th
East Retford	Ordsall Road		Retford, Nottinghamshire	2nd
Ilkeston II	The Stute		Ilkeston, Derbyshire	6th
Mansfield II	Eakring Road	1,000	Mansfield, Nottinghamshire	5th
Matlock II	Cromford Meadows		Cromford, Matlock, Derbyshire	3rd
Worksop	Stubbing Lane		Worksop, Nottinghamshire	8th

Locations of the 2026-27 Counties 4 Midlands East (North West) teams in Derbyshire and Nottinghamshire

=== North East ===
Departing were East Leake promoted to Counties 3 Midlands East (North West).

Nottingham Casuals II (8th in 2025-26) were originally allocated to the league but withdrew before it started with their place being taken by Spalding 2XV.

Team	Ground	Capacity	City/Area	Previous season
Horncastle	The Wong		Horncastle, Lincolnshire	7th
Kesteven II	Woodnook		Grantham, Lincolnshire	4th
Lincoln II	Longdales Park		Lincoln, Lincolnshire	5th
Mellish II	War Memorial Ground		Arnold, Nottingham, Nottinghamshire	6th
Nottingham Moderns II	Ferryfields		Wilford, Nottingham, Nottinghamshire	3rd
Paviors II	The Ron Rossin Ground		Nottingham, Nottinghamshire	2nd
Skegness	Wainfleet Road		Skegness, Lincolnshire	Relegated from Counties 3 Midlands East (North East)
Spalding II	Memorial Field		Spalding, Lincolnshire	New entry

Locations of the 2026-27 Counties 4 Midlands East (North East) teams

== 2025-26 ==
After a seven year hiatus the league was reinstated in two divisions.

== North West ==
Team	Ground	Capacity	City/Area	Previous season
Amber Valley	Lower Somercotes		Alfreton, Derbyshire	Relegated from Counties 3 Midlands East (North West)
Chesterfield Panthers	Dunston Road	2,000	Chesterfield, Derbyshire	Relegated from Counties 3 Midlands East (North West)
East Retford	Ordsall Road		Retford, Nottinghamshire	Relegated from Counties 3 Midlands East (North East)
Ilkeston II	The Stute		Ilkeston, Derbyshire	Relegated from Counties 3 Midlands East (Central)
Mansfield II	Eakring Road	1,000	Mansfield, Nottinghamshire	Relegated from Counties 3 Midlands East (North West)
Matlock II	Cromford Meadows		Cromford, Matlock, Derbyshire	Relegated from Counties 3 Midlands East (North West)
Meden Vale	Elkesley Road		Meden Vale, Nottinghamshire	Relegated from Counties 3 Midlands East (North East)
Worksop	Stubbing Lane		Worksop, Nottinghamshire	Relegated from Counties 3 Midlands East (North East)

Locations of the 2025-26 Counties 4 Midlands East (North West) teams in Derbyshire and Nottinghamshire

== North East ==
Team	Ground	Capacity	City/Area	Previous season
East Leake	Costock Road Playing Fields		East Leake, Nottinghamshire	New entry
Horncastle	The Wong		Horncastle, Lincolnshire	Re-entry
Kesteven II	Woodnook		Grantham, Lincolnshire	New entry
Lincoln II	Longdales Park		Lincoln, Lincolnshire	Relegated from Counties 3 Midlands East (North East)
Mellish II	War Memorial Ground		Arnold, Nottingham, Nottinghamshire	Relegated from Counties 3 Midlands East (Central)
Nottingham Casuals II	Weir Field Recreation Ground		Beeston, Nottingham, Nottinghamshire	New entry
Nottingham Moderns II	Ferryfields		Wilford, Nottingham, Nottinghamshire	Relegated from Counties 3 Midlands East (Central)
Paviors II	The Ron Rossin Ground		Nottingham, Nottinghamshire	Relegated from Counties 3 Midlands East (North West)

Locations of the 2025-26 Counties 4 Midlands East (North East) teams

== 2018-25 ==
Not contested

== 2017–18 ==
=== Participating teams & locations ===
Team	Ground	Capacity	City/Area	Previous season
Amber Valley	Lower Somercotes		Alfreton, Derbyshire	Relegated from Midlands 4 East (North) (9th)
Bingham	The Pavilion		Bingham, Nottinghamshire	7th
Cleethorpes	KGV Playing Fields		Cleethorpes, Lincolnshire	3rd
Gainsborough	Roses Sports Fields		Gainsborough, Lincolnshire	5th
Keyworth	Willoughby Road		Widmerpool, Nottinghamshire	2nd
Mansfield Woodhouse	Slate Lane		Mansfield Woodhouse, Nottinghamshire	8th
Meden Vale	Elkesley Road		Meden Vale, Nottinghamshire	Relegated from Midlands 4 East (North) (10th)
North Hykeham	One NK		North Hykeham, Lincolnshire	4th
Nottinghamians	Adbolton Lane		Holme Pierrepont, Nottinghamshire	6th

Locations of the 2017–18 Midlands 5 East (North) teams

== Teams 2016-17 ==
- Bingham
- Cleethorpes (relegated from Midlands 4 East (North))
- Gainsborough
- Keyworth
- North Hykeham (relegated from Midlands 4 East (North))
- Nottinghamians
- Skegness (relegated from Midlands 4 East (North))
- Woodhouse Giants

== Teams 2015-16 ==
- Barton & District
- Bingham (relegated from Midlands 4 East (North))
- Creswell Crusaders
- Gainsborough
- Keyworth (relegated from Midlands 4 East (North))
- Meden Vale
- Nottinghamians
- Ollerton
- Skegness (relegated from Midlands 4 East (North))
- Woodhouse Giants

== Teams 2014-15 ==
- Barton & District
- Birstall
- Creswell Crusaders
- Gainsborough
- Leesbrook (relegated from Midlands 4 East (North))
- Meden Vale
- North Hykeham
- Nottinghamians (relegated from Midlands 4 East (North))
- Ollerton
- Woodhouse Giants

== Teams 2013-14 ==
- Birstall
- Creswell Crusaders
- Gainsborough
- Horncastle (relegated from Midlands 4 East (North))
- Meden Vale
- North Hykeham
- Nottingham Corsairs
- Ollerton
- Rolls-Royce
- Sileby Town
- Woodhouse Giants

== Teams 2012–13 ==
- Bingham
- Castle Donington
- Creswell Crusaders
- East Leake
- Leesbrook
- Meden Vale
- North Hykehan
- Ollerton
- Rolls-Royce

== Teams 2008–09 ==
- Belper
- Castle Donington
- Chesterfield Panthers
- East Leake
- East Retford
- Leesbrook
- Melbourne
- Nottinghamians
- Rolls-Royce
- Worksop

== Teams 2007–08 ==
- Barton & District
- Chesterfield Pythons
- Dronfield
- East Leake
- East Retford
- Melbourne
- Nottingham Casuals
- Nottinghamians
- Rolls-Royce
- University Of Derby

== Original teams ==
When this division was introduced in 2006 it was split into two separate divisions - Midlands 6 East (North-East) and Midlands 6 East (North-West) - containing the following teams:

Midlands 6 East (North-East)

- Barton & District – N/A (new to league)
- Bourne - transferred from Nottinghamshire/Lincolnshire (7th)
- Cleethorpes - transferred from Nottinghamshire/Lincolnshire (2nd)
- Gainsborough - transferred from Nottinghamshire/Lincolnshire (9th)
- Horncastle – N/A (new to league)
- North Hykeham – N/A (new to league)
- Nottingham Corsairs - transferred from Nottinghamshire/Lincolnshire (3rd)
- Ollerton - transferred from Nottinghamshire/Lincolnshire (5th)
- Skegness - transferred from Nottinghamshire/Lincolnshire (4th)

Midlands 6 East (North-West)

- All Spartans Old Boys
- Belper - transferred from Derbyshire/North Leicestershire (4th)
- Buxton – relegated from Notts, Lincs & Derbyshire/North Leicestershire (10th)
- Chesterfield Panthers (2nd XV) (Note: 2nd team of Chesterfield Panthers.) – N/A (new to league)
- Leesbrook - transferred from Derbyshire/North Leicestershire (7th)
- Meden Vale - transferred from Nottinghamshire/Lincolnshire (6th)
- Melbourne - transferred from Derbyshire/North Leicestershire (6th)
- Rolls-Royce - transferred from Derbyshire/North Leicestershire (5th)
- Tupton - transferred from Derbyshire/North Leicestershire (8th)
- Uttoxeter - transferred from Derbyshire/North Leicestershire (3rd)

== Midlands 5 East (North) honours ==
=== Midlands 6 East (North-East) / (North-West) / South (2006–2009) ===
The league was originally divided into two sub-divisions known as Midlands 6 East (North-East) and Midlands 6 East (North-West). These divisions were introduced along with their counterpart Midlands 6 East (South) at tier 10 to replace the discontinued East Midlands/South Leicestershire 2, Derbyshire/North Leicestershire, Nottinghamshire/Lincolnshire leagues. Promotion was to Midlands 5 East (North) and there was no relegation.

Midlands 6 East (North-East & North-West)
Season	No. of teams	Champions	Runners-up	Relegated teams	League name	Reference
2006–07	9	Barton & District	Cleethorpes (Note: Nottingham Corsairs also promoted.)	No relegation	Midlands 6 East (North-East)	
2006–07	10	Melbourne	Rolls-Royce	No relegation	Midlands 6 East (North-West)	
2007–08	6	Worksop	Ollerton	No relegation	Midlands 6 East (North-East)	
2007–08	10	Belper	Leesbrook	No relegation	Midlands 6 East (North-West)	
2008–09	5	Cleethorpes	Skegness	No relegation	Midlands 6 East (North-East) (Note: Last season as Midlands 6 East (North-East). All teams not promoted would transfer to the new look Midlands 5 East along with teams from Midlands 6 (North-West) for the following season.)	
2008–09	8	Uttoxeter	Dronfield	No relegation	Midlands 6 East (North-West) (Note: Last season as Midlands 6 East (North-West). All teams not promoted would transfer to the new look Midlands 5 East along with teams from Midlands 6 (North-East) for the following season.)	
Green backgrounds are promotion places.

=== Midlands 5 East (North) (2009–present) ===
Midlands 6 East (North-East / North-West) were remerged into a single division ahead of the 2009–10 season known as Midlands 5 East (North), which remained a tier 10 league along with its counterpart Midlands 5 East (South) (formerly Midlands 6 East (South)). Promotion was now to Midlands 4 East (North) (formerly the old Midlands 5 East (North)) and there was no relegation. The league was discontinued at the end of the 2017–18 season.

Midlands 5 East (North)
Season	No. of teams	Champions	Runners-up	Relegated teams	Reference
2009–10	8	Tupton	Nottingham Corsairs	No relegation	
2010–11	8	Long Eaton	Horncastle	No relegation	
2011–12	8	Boston	Keyworth	No relegation	
2012–13	8	Bingham	Leesbrook	No relegation	
2013–14	9	Sileby Town	Rolls-Royce	No relegation	
2014–15	10	Birstall	North Hykeham	No relegation	
2015–16	10	Ollerton	Meden Vale	No relegation	
2016–17	8	Skegness	Keyworth	No relegation	
2017–18	9	Cleethorpes	North Hykeham (Note: As the league was to be abolished the majority of teams in the division were promoted into Midlands 4 East (North).)	No relegation	
Green backgrounds are promotion places.

== Promotion play-offs ==
Between 2008 and 2009 there was a promotion playoff between the runners-up of Midlands 5 East (North-East) and Midlands 5 East (North-West) for the third and final promotion place to Midlands 4 West (North), with the team with the superior league record having home advantage in the tie. The playoffs were dissolved at the end of the 2008-09 season when Midlands 5 East (North) became one division. By the end of the promotion play-offs the Midlands 5 East (North-West) teams won all both playoff games and the home team has also won promotion both times.

Midlands 5 East (North-East) v Midlands 5 East (North-West) promotion play-off results
Season	Home team	Score	Away team	Venue	Attendance
2007–08	Leesbrook (NW)	50–10	Ollerton (NE)	Asterdale Sports Centre, Spondon, Derby, Derbyshire	
2008–09	Dronfield (NW)	37–0	Skegness (NE)	Gosforth Fields, Dronfield Woodhouse, Dronfield, Derbyshire	
Green background is the promoted team. NE = Midlands 5 East (North-East) (formerly Midlands 6 East (North-East)) and NW = Midlands 5 East (North-West) (formerly Midlands 6 East (North-West))

== Number of league titles ==
- Cleethorpes (2) (Note: One of Cleepthorpes titles was won when division was split into Midlands 6 East (North-East) and Midlands 6 East (North-West).)
- Barton & District (1) (Note: Barton & Districts title was won when division was split into Midlands 6 East (North-East) and Midlands 6 East (North-West).)
- Belper (1) (Note: Belper's title was won when division was split into Midlands 6 East (North-East) and Midlands 6 East (North-West).)
- Bingham (1)
- Birstall (1)
- Boston (1)
- Long Eaton (1)
- Melbourne (1) (Note: Melbourne's title was won when division was split into Midlands 6 East (North-East) and Midlands 6 East (North-West).)
- Ollerton (1)
- Sileby Town (1)
- Skegness (1)
- Tupton (1)
- Uttoxeter (1) (Note: Uttoxeter's title was won when division was split into Midlands 6 East (North-East) and Midlands 6 East (North-West).)
- Worksop (1) (Note: Worksop's title was won when division was split into Midlands 6 East (North-East) and Midlands 6 East (North-West).)

== See also ==
- Leicestershire RU
- Notts, Lincs & Derbyshire RFU
- English rugby union system
- Rugby union in England
