= Counties 3 Midlands East (South) =

English Rugby Union League

- Current season or competition: 2024–25 Counties 3 Midlands East (South)
- Sport: Rugby union
- Instituted: 2006; 20 years ago (as Midlands 5 East (South))
- Number of teams: 11
- Country: England
- Most titles: St Neots (2 titles)
- Website: England RFU

Counties 3 Midlands East (South North) / (South South) (formerly Midlands 4 East (South) area level 9 English Rugby Union leagues and level 4 of the Midlands League, made up of teams from the southern part of the East Midlands region including clubs from Bedfordshire, Leicestershire, Northamptonshire, Lincolnshire and occasionally Cambridgeshire, all of whom play home and away matches throughout the season. Each year, some of the clubs in this division also take part in the RFU Junior Vase – a level 9–12 national competition.

Formed for the 2006-07 season, the division was originally known as Midlands 5 East (South) but changed to its present name for the 2008-09 season due to league restructuring. Further restructuring of the Midlands leagues ahead of the 2009–10 season, saw it changed to Midlands 4 East (South) and post the RFU's Adult Competition Review, from season 2022–23 it adopted its current name. From 2023–24 the league was split into South and Central divisions.

Promoted teams move up to Counties 2 Midlands East (South) and since Midlands 5 East (South) was abolished, there has been no relegation.

== 2026–27 ==
=== South North ===
Departing were Leicester Lions II (champions), promoted to Counties 2 Midlands East (South).

Departing were Rugby St Andrews (3rd), Market Harborough II (5th) and Rugby Welsh (10th) who moved on a level transfer to Counties 3 Midlands East (South South).

Aylestone St James re-joined the league having last competed in 2021-22 before withdrawing midway through that season.

Team	Ground	Capacity	City/Area	Previous season
Aylestone Athletic	Victoria Road		Leicester, Leicestershire	Level transfer from South (6th)
Aylestone St James	Covert Lane		Leicester, Leicestershire	Re-entry
Birstall	Co-Op Sports Ground		Birstall, Leicestershire	6th
Loughborough II	Derby Road Playing Fields		Loughborough, Leicestershire	New entry
Oakham	Rutland Showground		Oakham, Rutland	7th
Quorn	Rawlins Academy Sports Facilities		Quorn, Leicestershire	New entry
Sileby	Platts Lane		Cossington, Leicestershire	2nd
South Leicester	Welford Road Ground		Leicester, Leicestershire	11th
Stamford II	Hambleton Road		Stamford, Lincolnshire	New entry
Stamford College Old Boys	Stamford Welland Academy		Stamford, Lincolnshire	8th
Syston III	Barkby Road		Queniborough, Leicestershire	4th
Vipers II	Vipers Ground		Whetstone, Leicestershire	9th

Locations of the 2026–27 Counties 3 Midlands East (South North) teams
Locations of the 2026–27 Counties 3 Midlands East (South North) teams in Leicester

=== South South ===
Departing were Old Northamptonians II promoted to Counties 2 Midlands East (South).

Daventry 2XV (5th in 2025-26) were placed in the league but subsequently withdrew.

Huntingdon & District were relegated into the league from Counties 2 Midlands East (South) (11th in 2025-26) but withdrew from the competition on 5th October .

Team	Ground	Capacity	City/Area	Previous season
Ampthill IV	Dillingham Park	3,000	Ampthill, Bedfordshire	2nd
Bedford Athletic II	Putnoe Woods	500	Bedford, Bedfordshire	4th
Kettering II	Waverley Road		Kettering, Northamptonshire	3rd
Market Harborough II	The Rugby Ground		Market Harborough, Leicestershire	Level transfer from (North) (5th)
Newbold on Avon II	Parkfield Road		Newbold-on-Avon, Warwickshire	Promoted from Counties 4 Midlands West (South East) (runners-up)
Northampton BBOB	Saint Andrew's Road		Northampton, Northamptonshire	Re-entry
Olney II	East Street		Olney, Buckinghamshire	6th
Rugby Lions	Webb Ellis Road	3,200 (200 seats)	Rugby, Warwickshire	Relegated from Counties 2 Midlands East (South) (12th)
Rugby St Andrews	Ashlawn Road		Rugby, Warwickshire	Level transfer from (North) (3rd)
Rugby Welsh	Alwyn Road		Rugby, Warwickshire	Level transfer from (North) (10th)

Locations of the 2026–27 Counties 3 Midlands East South (South) teams

== 2025–26 ==
Ahead of the new season the Central league was rebranded South (North) and the South league rebranded South (South).

=== South North ===
Departing were West Bridgford II (champions), promoted to Counties 2 Midlands East (South).

The rest of the teams in the previous season's league were level transferred with Long Eaton II (runners-up), Castle Donington (6th), Leesbrook (7th), Melbourne II (5th), Nottinghamians (8th) all moving to the Counties 3 Midlands East (North West) division; while Bingham (3rd) and Southwell II (4th) moved to the Counties 3 Midlands East (North East) division.

Ilkeston II (9th), Mellish II (10th) and Nottingham Moderns II (11th) did not return for the new season.

Team	Ground	Capacity	City/Area	Previous season
Aylestone Athletic	Victoria Road		Leicester, Leicestershire	Level transfer from South (6th)
Birstall	Co-Op Sports Ground		Birstall, Leicestershire	Relegated from Counties 2 Midlands East (North) (9th)
Leicester Lions II	Westleigh Park	2,000	Blaby, Leicestershire	New entry
Market Harborough II	The Rugby Ground		Market Harborough, Leicestershire	New entry
Oakham	Rutland Showground		Oakham, Rutland	Relegated from Counties 2 Midlands East (South) (10th)
Rugby St Andrews	Ashlawn Road		Rugby, Warwickshire	Relegated from Counties 2 Midlands East (South) (9th)
Rugby Welsh	Alwyn Road		Rugby, Warwickshire	Level transfer from South (4th)
Sileby	Platts Lane		Cossington, Leicestershire	Level transfer from South (7th)
South Leicester	Welford Road Ground		Leicester, Leicestershire	Level transfer from South (10th)
Stamford College Old Boys	Stamford Welland Academy		Stamford, Lincolnshire	Level transfer from South (8th)
Syston III	Barkby Road		Queniborough, Leicestershire	New entry
Vipers II	Vipers Ground		Whetstone, Leicestershire	New entry

Locations of the 2025-26 Counties 3 Midlands East (South North) teams
Locations of the 2025-26 Counties 3 Midlands East (South North) teams in Leicester

=== South South ===
Departing were Leighton Buzzard (champions) and Rugby Lions (runners-up), both promoted to Counties 2 Midlands East (South) while Luton (3rd) were promoted to the newly re-branded Counties 2 Hertfordshire (formerly Counties 2 Herts/Middlesex).

Also leaving on a level transfer to the South (North) division were Aylestone Athletic (6th), Rugby Welsh (4th), Sielby (7th), South Leicester (10th) and Stamford College Old Boys (8th).

Deepings (11th) and Northampton Men's Own (9th) did not return for the new season.

Bedford Queens (5th) were initially placed in the league but withdrew before the season began. Similarly Northampton BBOB were relegated from Counties 2 Midlands East (South) (11th) into this league but also withdrew before the season began.

Team	Ground	Capacity	City/Area	Previous season
Ampthill IV	Dillingham Park	3,000	Ampthill, Bedfordshire	New entry
Bedford Athletic II	Putnoe Woods	500	Bedford, Bedfordshire	Relegated from Counties 2 Eastern Counties (7th)
Daventry II	Daventry & District Sports Club		Daventry, Northamptonshire	New entry
Kettering II	Waverley Road		Kettering, Northamptonshire	New entry
Old Northamptonians II	Sir Humphrey Cripps Pavilion		Northampton, Northamptonshire	New entry
Olney II	East Street		Olney, Buckinghamshire	New entry

Locations of the 2025-26 Counties 3 Midlands East South (South) teams

== 2024–25 ==
=== Central ===
Departing were Keyworth, promoted to Counties 2 Midlands East (South) together with Asbourne II, North Hykeham, Paviors II, Rolls-Royce and Sleaford who all returned to the Counties 3 Midlands East (North) East and West divisions.

Joining were Bingham, Castle Donington, Ilkeston II, Leesbrook and Nottingham Moderns II.

Spalding II (new entry) started but did not complete the season withdrawing to leave the remaining eleven sides to contest the remaining fixtures.

Team	Ground	Capacity	City/Area	Previous season
Bingham	The Pavilion		Bingham, Nottinghamshire	Re-entry
Castle Donington	Spital Park Pavilion		Castle Donington, Derbyshire	Level transfer from Counties 3 Midlands East (South) (4th)
Ilkeston II	The Stute		Ilkeston, Derbyshire	New entry
Leesbrook	Asterdale Sports Centre		Spondon, Derby, Derbyshire	Re-entry
Long Eaton II	West Park	1,000	Long Eaton, Derbyshire	6th
Melbourne II	Cockshut Lane	2,000	Melbourne, Derbyshire	4th
Mellish II	War Memorial Ground		Arnold, Nottingham, Nottinghamshire	12th
Nottinghamians	Adbolton Lane		Holme Pierrepont, Nottinghamshire	11th
Nottingham Moderns II	Ferryfields		Wilford, Nottingham, Nottinghamshire	New entry
Southwell II	Pentelowes		Southwell, Nottinghamshire	9th
West Bridgford II	The Memorial Ground		West Bridgford, Nottinghamshire	2nd

Locations of the 2024-25 Counties 3 Midlands East (Central) teams in Derbyshire and Lincolnshire
Locations of the 2024-25 Counties 3 Midlands East (Central) teams in Nottinghamshire

=== South ===
Departing were Northampton BBOB and Rugby St Andrews, both promoted to Counties 2 Midlands East (South). Castle Donington left on a level transfer to Counties 3 Midlands East (Central).

Joining were Luton and Bedford Queens, both relegated into the league together with Aylestone Athletic, a re-entry, and Leighton Buzzard who had withdrawn from Regional 2 Thames mid-way through the previous season.

Team	Ground	Capacity	City/Area	Previous season
Aylestone Athletic	Victoria Road		Leicester, Leicestershire	Re-entry
Bedford Queens	Putnoe Woods	500	Bedford, Bedfordshire	Relegated from Counties 2 Midlands East (South)
Deepings	Spalding Road		Deeping St James, Lincolnshire	10th
Leighton Buzzard	Wright's Meadow		Leighton Buzzard, Buckinghamshire	Re-entry
Luton	Newlands Road		Luton, Bedfordshire	Relegated from Counties 2 Midlands East (South)
Northampton Men's Own	Stoke Road		Ashton, Northamptonshire	5th
Rugby Lions	Webb Ellis Road	3,200 (200 seats)	Rugby, Warwickshire	7th
Rugby Welsh	Alwyn Road		Rugby, Warwickshire	3rd
Sileby	Platts Lane		Cossington, Leicestershire	6th
South Leicester	Welford Road Ground		Leicester, Leicestershire	9th
Stamford College Old Boys	Stamford Welland Academy		Stamford, Lincolnshire	8th

Locations of the 2024-25 Counties 3 Midlands East (South) teams

== 2023–24 ==
Ahead of the new season a new Central division was introduced.

=== Central ===
This newly created league was formed in the majority of sides on a level transfer from Counties 3 Midlands East (North) East and West divisions plus the addition of Melllish 2XV.

Team	Ground	Capacity	City/Area	Previous season
Ashbourne II	Recreation Ground		Ashbourne, Derbyshire	Level transfer from Counties 3 Midlands East (North) West (10th)
Keyworth	Willoughby Road		Widmerpool, Nottinghamshire	Level transfer from Counties 3 Midlands East (North) West (2nd)
Long Eaton II	West Park	1,000	Long Eaton, Derbyshire	Level transfer from Counties 3 Midlands East (North) West (11th)
Melbourne II	Cockshut Lane	2,000	Melbourne, Derbyshire	Level transfer from Counties 3 Midlands East (North) West (5th)
Mellish II	War Memorial Ground		Arnold, Nottingham, Nottinghamshire	New entry
North Hykeham	Ruston Sports and Bar		North Hykeham, Lincolnshire	Level transfer from Counties 3 Midlands East (North) East (5th)
Nottinghamians	Adbolton Lane		Holme Pierrepont, Nottinghamshire	Level transfer from Counties 3 Midlands East (North) East (8th)
Paviors II	The Ron Rossin Ground		Nottingham, Nottinghamshire	Level transfer from Counties 3 Midlands East (North) East (7th)
Rolls-Royce	Moor Lane		Derby, Derbyshire	Level transfer from Counties 3 Midlands East (North) West (8th)
Sleaford	David Williams Pavilion		Sleaford, Lincolnshire	Level transfer from Counties 3 Midlands East (North) East (6th)
Southwell II	Pentelowes		Southwell, Nottinghamshire	Level transfer from Counties 3 Midlands East (North) East (4th)
West Bridgford II	The Memorial Ground		West Bridgford, Nottinghamshire	Level transfer from Counties 3 Midlands East (North) West (7th)

Locations of the 2023-24 Counties 3 Midlands East (Central) teams

=== South ===
Departing were Bedford Swifts and Brackley, both promoted to Counties 2 Midlands East (South). Thorley (7th) were relegated into the Cambridgeshire reserve leagues.

Joining were Castle Donington, Northampton BBOB, Northampton Men's Own, Rugby St Andrews, Rugby Welsh and Sielby.

Team	Ground	Capacity	City/Area	Previous season
Castle Donington	Spital Park Pavilion		Castle Donington, Derbyshire	Re-entry
Deepings	Spalding Road		Deeping St James, Lincolnshire	6th
Northampton BBOB	Saint Andrew's Road		Northampton, Northamptonshire	Relegated from Counties 2 Midlands East (South)
Northampton Men's Own	Stoke Road		Ashton, Northamptonshire	Relegated from Counties 2 Midlands East (South)
Rugby Lions	Webb Ellis Road	3,200 (200 seats)	Rugby, Warwickshire	3rd
Rugby St Andrews	Ashlawn Road		Rugby, Warwickshire	Relegated from Counties 2 Midlands West (East) (10th)
Rugby Welsh	Alwyn Road		Rugby, Warwickshire	Level transfer from Counties 3 Midlands West (South) (6th)
Sileby	Platts Lane		Cossington, Leicestershire	Relegated from Counties 2 Midlands East (South)
South Leicester	Welford Road Ground		Leicester, Leicestershire	4th
Stamford College Old Boys	Stamford Welland Academy		Stamford, Lincolnshire	5th

Locations of the 2023-24 Counties 3 Midlands East (South) teams

== 2022–23 ==
Departing were Biggleswade, St Neots and Northampton BBOB, all promoted to Counties 2 Midlands East (South).

Joining were Rugby Lions.

Team	Ground	Capacity	City/Area	Previous season
Bedford Swifts	International Athletics Stadium		Bedford, Bedfordshire	4th
Brackley	Nightingale Close		Brackley, Northamptonshire	5th
Deepings	Spalding Road		Deeping St James, Lincolnshire	7th
Rugby Lions	Webb Ellis Road	3,200 (200 seats)	Rugby, Warwickshire	Re-entry
South Leicester	Welford Road Ground		Leicester, Leicestershire	8th
Stamford College Old Boys	Stamford Welland Academy		Stamford, Lincolnshire	6th
Thorney	Ron Jacobs Playing Fields		Thorney, Cambridgeshire	9th

Locations of the 2022-23 Counties 3 Midlands East (South) teams

== 2021–22 ==
=== Participating teams and locations ===
Kempston, who finished 11th in 2019-20, and Wellingborough Old Grammarians, who finished 12th in 2019-20, did not return for the current season.

Joining the league are South Leicester who withdrew from Midlands Premier in season 2019-20.

Aylestone St James withdrew from the league midway through the season leaving it with nine teams.

Team	Ground	Capacity	City/Area	Previous season
Aylestone St James	Covert Lane		Scraptoft, Leicester, Leicestershire	8th
Bedford Swifts	International Athletics Stadium		Bedford, Bedfordshire	3rd
Biggleswade	Langford Road		Biggleswade, Bedfordshire	5th
Brackley	Nightingale Close		Brackley, Northamptonshire	6th
Deepings	Spalding Road		Deeping St James, Lincolnshire	7th
Northampton BBOB	Saint Andrew's Road		Northampton, Northamptonshire	Relegated from Midlands 3 East (South) (11th)
South Leicester	Welford Road Ground		Leicester, Leicestershire	New entry
Stamford College Old Boys	Stamford Welland Academy		Stamford, Lincolnshire	4th
St Neots	The Common		St Neots, Cambridgeshire	Relegated from Midlands 3 East (South) (12th)
Thorney	Ron Jacobs Playing Fields		Thorney, Cambridgeshire	9th

Locations of the 2021–22 Midlands 4 East (South) teams

== 2020–21 ==
Due to the COVID-19 pandemic, the 2020–21 season was cancelled.

== 2019–20 ==
=== Participating teams and locations ===
Team	Ground	Capacity	City/Area	Previous season
Aylestone St James	Covert Lane		Scraptoft, Leicester, Leicestershire	6th
Bedford Swifts	International Athletics Stadium		Bedford, Bedfordshire	5th
Biggleswade	Langford Road		Biggleswade, Bedfordshire	Relegated from Midlands 3 ES (12th)
Birstall	Co-Op Sports Ground		Birstall, Leicestershire	Relegated from Midlands 3 ES (11th)
Brackley	Nightingale Close		Brackley, Northamptonshire	4th
Deepings	Spalding Road		Deeping St James, Lincolnshire	7th
Kempston	Cutler Hammer		Kempston, Bedfordshire	11th
Northampton Men's Own	Stoke Road		Ashton, Northamptonshire	3rd
Stamford College Old Boys	Stamford Welland Academy		Stamford, Lincolnshire	9th
Thorney	Ron Jacobs Playing Fields		Thorney, Cambridgeshire	10th
Wellingborough Old Grammarians	The Memorial Sports Ground		Wellingborough, Northamptonshire	8th

Locations of the 2019–20 Midlands 4 East (South) teams

== 2018–19 ==
=== Participating teams and locations ===
Team	Ground	Capacity	City/Area	Previous season
Aylestone St James	Covert Lane		Scraptoft, Leicester, Leicestershire	7th
Bedford Swifts	International Athletics Stadium		Bedford, Bedfordshire	3rd
Brackley	Nightingale Close		Brackley, Northamptonshire	6th
Deepings	Spalding Road		Deeping St James, Lincolnshire	5th
Kempston	Cutler Hammer		Kempston, Bedfordshire	Promoted from East Midlands Merit League (champions)
Northampton BBOB	Saint Andrew's Road		Northampton, Northamptonshire	Relegated from Midlands 3 East (South) (12th)
Northampton Men's Own	Stoke Road		Ashton, Northamptonshire	Relegated from Midlands 3 East (South) (11th)
Sileby Town	Platts Lane		Cossington, Leicestershire	Relegated from Midlands 3 East (North) (12th)
Stamford College Old Boys	Stamford Welland Academy		Stamford, Lincolnshire	9th
Thorney	Ron Jacobs Playing Fields		Thorney, Cambridgeshire	8th
Wellingborough Old Grammarians	The Memorial Sports Ground		Wellingborough, Northamptonshire	4th

Locations of the 2018–19 Midlands 4 East (South) teams

== 2017–18 ==
=== Participating teams and locations ===
Team	Ground	Capacity	City/Area	Previous season
Aylestone St James	Covert Lane		Scraptoft, Leicester, Leicestershire	Relegated from Midlands 3 East (South) (12th)
Bedford Swifts	International Athletics Stadium		Bedford, Bedfordshire	9th
Bourne	Milking Nook Drove		Bourne, Lincolnshire	5th
Brackley	Nightingale Close		Brackley, Northamptonshire	6th
Deepings	Spalding Road		Deeping St James, Lincolnshire	3rd
St Neots	The Common		St Neots, Cambridgeshire	Relegated from Midlands 3 East (South) (11th)
Stamford College Old Boys	Stamford Welland Academy		Stamford, Lincolnshire	4th
Thorney	Ron Jacobs Playing Fields		Thorney, Cambridgeshire	7th
Wellingborough Old Grammarians	The Memorial Sports Ground		Wellingborough, Northamptonshire	8th

Locations of the 2017–18 Midlands 4 East (South) teams

== Teams 2016–17 ==
- Bedford Queens
- Bedford Swifts
- Bourne
- Brackley
- Deepings
- Old Newtonians
- Sileby Town
- Stamford College Old Boys
- Thorney
- Wellingborough Old Grammarians

== Teams 2015–16 ==
- Bedford Queens (relegated from Midlands 3 East (South))
- Bedford Swifts
- Birstall
- Bourne
- Brackley
- Deepings
- Northampton Men's Own (relegated from Midlands 3 East (South))
- Sileby Town
- Stamford College Old Boys
- Thorney
- Wellingborough Old Grammarians

== Teams 2014–15 ==
- Bedford Swifts
- Bourne
- Brackley (relegated from Midlands 3 East (South))
- Corby
- Deepings (relegated from Midlands 3 East (South))
- Kempston
- Old Newtonians
- Sileby Town
- St Neots
- Stamford College Old Boys
- Thorney
- Westwood

== Teams 2013–14 ==
- Aylestone Athletic
- Bedford Swifts
- Bourne
- Corby
- Kempston
- Long Buckby (relegated from Midlands 3 East (South))
- Old Newtonians (relegated from Midlands 3 East (South))
- Oundale
- St Neots
- Stamford College Old Boys
- Thorney
- Westwood

== Teams 2012–13 ==
- Aylestone Athletic
- Bedford Swifts
- Bourne
- Brackley
- Corby
- Oundale
- St Ives (Midlands)
- St Neots
- Stamford College Old Boys
- Thorney
- Wellingborough Old Grammarians
- Westwood

== Teams 2008–09 ==
- Ashfield
- Bedford Swifts
- Brackley
- Bugbrooke
- Daventry
- Deepings
- Long Buckby
- Market Harborough
- Northampton Casuals
- Northampton Men's Own
- Peterborough Lions
- Rugby St Andrews
- Vauxhall Motors

== Original teams ==
When this division was introduced in 2006 as Midlands 5 East (South), it contained the following teams:

- Aylestone St James - promoted from East Midlands/South Leicestershire 2 (champions)
- Bedford Queens - transferred from East Midlands/South Leicestershire 1 (4th)
- Bedford Swifts - transferred from East Midlands/South Leicestershire 1 (3rd)
- Kempston - promoted from East Midlands/South Leicestershire 2 (runners up)
- Market Harborough (Note: Market Harborough RUFC were known as Kibworth RFC prior to this season.) - transferred from East Midlands/South Leicestershire 1 (5th)
- Oundle - transferred from East Midlands/South Leicestershire 1 (7th)
- St Ives (Midlands) - transferred from East Midlands/South Leicestershire 1 (8th)
- Stamford - transferred from Notts, Lincs & Derbyshire/North Leicestershire (11th)
- Stoneygate - relegated from Midlands 4 East (South) (10th)
- Wellingborough Old Grammarians - transferred from East Midlands/South Leicestershire 1 (6th)

== Midlands 4 East (South) honours ==
=== Midlands 5 West (North) (2006–2009) ===
League restructuring ahead of the 2006–07 season saw the introduction of Midlands 5 East (South) and its counterpart Midlands 5 East (North) at tier 9 to replace the discontinued East Midlands/South Leicestershire 1 and Notts, Lincs, Derbyshire/North Leicestershire leagues. Promotion was to Midlands 4 East (South) and relegation to Midlands 6 East (South).

Midlands 5 East (South)
Season	No of teams	Champions	Runners–up	Relegated teams	Reference
2006–07	10	Bedford Swifts	Aylestone St James	Wellingborough O.G., Kempston	
2007–08	10	Market Harborough	Deepings	St Ives (Midlands), Stamford	
2008–09	10	Stockwood Park	Bedford Queens	Kempston, Wellingborough O.G., Aylestone Athletic	
Green backgrounds are promotion places.

=== Midlands 4 East (South) (2009–present) ===
Further league restructuring by the RFU meant that Midlands 5 East (North) and Midlands 5 East (South) were renamed as Midlands 4 East (North) and Midlands 4 East (South), with both leagues remaining at tier 9. Promotion was now to Midlands 3 East (South) (formerly Midlands 4 East (South)) and relegation to Midlands 5 East (South) (formerly Midlands 6 East (South)) until that league was discontinued at the end of the 2009–10 season.

Midlands 4 East (South)
Season	No of teams	Champions	Runners–up	Relegated teams	Reference
2009–10	8	Oadby Wyggestonians	Rushden & Higham	No relegation (Note: No relegation as division due to increase from 8 to 11 teams and Midlands 5 East (South) abolished for the following season.)	
2010–11	11	Stamford	Biggleswade	No relegation	
2011–12	12	Old Newtonians	Northampton Men's Own	No relegation	
2012–13	12	Brackley	St Ives (Midlands)	No relegation	
2013–14	11	Long Buckby	Oundle	No relegation	
2014–15	10	St Neots	Old Newtonians	No relegation	
2015–16	10	Northampton Men's Own	Birstall	No relegation	
2016–17	9	Sileby Town	Bedford Queens	No relegation	
2017–18	9	St Neots	Bourne	No relegation	
2018–19	11	N'hampton BBOB	Sileby	No relegation	
2019–20	11	Birstall	Northampton Men's Own	No relegation	
2020–21	11			No relegation	
Green backgrounds are promotion places.

== Number of league titles ==
- St Neots (2)
- Bedford Swifts (1)
- Birstall (1)
- Brackley (1)
- Long Buckby (1)
- Market Harborough (1)
- N'hampton BBOB (1)
- Northampton Men's Own (1)
- Oadby Wyggestonians (1)
- Old Newtonians (1)
- Sileby Town (1)
- Stamford (1)
- Stockwood Park (1)

== See also ==
- Midlands RFU
- East Midlands RFU
- Leicestershire RU
- English rugby union system
- Rugby union in England
