= 2017–18 RFU Senior Vase =

English level 8 rugby union competition

Tournament details
- Countries: England
- Tournament format(s): knockout
- Date: 2 September 2017 – 6 May 2018

Tournament statistics
- Teams: 94

Final
- Venue: Twickenham Stadium
- Champions: Wath-upon-Dearne (1st title)
- Runners-up: Saltash

The 2017–18 RFU Senior Vase is the 12th version of the RFU Senior Vase national cup competition for clubs at level 8 of the English rugby union system. The competition consists of 94 clubs divided into four regions. The winners of each region then advance to the national semi-finals with the final being held at Twickenham Stadium in London at the end of the season, along with the RFU Intermediate Cup and RFU Junior Vase finals.

The 2017–18 champions were Wath-upon-Dearne, who pipped Cornish side Saltash, 22–18 in an entertaining final. It was Wath-upon-Dearne's second final in the competition, having lost to south-west side, Wells, in the 2012 edition. By claiming the vase they also replicated West Leeds (winners in 2016) to become the second Yorkshire club to win the competition since its inception back in the 2006–07 season.

== London & South East Senior Vase ==
The London & South East Senior Vase involves a knock-out competition with 1st round, 2nd round, 3rd round, semi-finals and final. The winners of the London & South East Senior Vase then go on to the national Senior Vase semi-finals where they face the winners of the South West Senior Vase. There are 26 teams involved in the London & South East Senior Vase, all of which are 1st XV sides, coming from the following unions and level 8 leagues.

Union(s)	League(s) / Level	Participants
Eastern Counties	London 3 Eastern Counties (8)	6
Essex	London 3 Essex (8)	2
Hampshire	London 3 South West (8)	3
Hertfordshire	London 3 North West (8)	4
Kent	London 3 South East (8)	6
Middlesex	London 3 South West (8)	1 (Note: Teddington are members of both the Middlesex and Surrey unions but tend to play in Middlesex county cup competitions.)
Surrey	London 3 South West (8)	3 (Note: One of the Surrey clubs, Battersea Ironsides, are members of both the Middlesex and Surrey unions but play in Surrey county cup competitions.)
Sussex	London 3 South East (8)	1

=== Round 1 ===
Byes: Bromley (L3SE), Portsmouth (L3SW), Old Cranleighans (L3SW), Thanet Wanderers (L3SE), Warlingham (L3SW), Welwyn (L3NW)

Date	Home	Score	Away
14/10/2017	Cheshunt (L3NW)	AWO	Southwold (L3EC)
14/10/2017	Datchworth (L3NW)	44–17	Teddington (L3SW)
14/10/2017	Hitchin (L3NW)	22–34	Stowmarket (L3EC)
14/10/2017	Newmarket (L3EC)	AWO	Wisbech (L3EC)
14/10/2017	Old Dunstonians (L3SE)	30–25	Battersea Ironsides (L3SW)
14/10/2017	Old Williamsonians (L3SE)	21–59	Trojans (L3SW)
14/10/2017	Petersfield (L3SW)	8–50	Aylesford Bulls (L3SE)
14/10/2017	Sheppey (L3SE)	40–20	Crawley (L3SE)
14/10/2017	Thetford (L3EC)	56–10	Maldon (L3E)
14/10/2017	West Norfolk (L3EC)	HWO	Basildon (L3E)

=== Round 2 ===
Date	Home	Score	Away
18/11/2017	Aylesford Bulls (L3SE)	17–12	Welwyn (L3NW)
18/11/2017	Bromley (L3SE)	41–0	Thanet Wanderers (L3SE)
18/11/2017	Old Cranleighans (L3SW)	HWO	Sheppey (L3SE)
18/11/2017	Old Dunstonians (L3SE)	10–34	Trojans (L3SW)
18/11/2017	Portsmouth (L3SW)	HWO	Warlingham (L3SW)
18/11/2017	Southwold (L3EC)	HWO	Wisbech (L3EC)
18/11/2017	Stowmarket (L3EC)	10–27	Datchworth (L3NW)
18/11/2017	West Norfolk (L3EC)	22–41	Thetford (L3EC)

=== Round 3 ===
Date	Home	Score	Away
20/01/2018	Old Cranleighans (L3SW)	23–12	Southwold (L3EC)
20/01/2018	Portsmouth (L3SW)	31–0	Datchworth (L3NW)
20/01/2018	Thetford (L3EC)	19–31	Bromley (L3SE)
20/01/2018	Trojans (L3SW)	17–14	Aylesford Bulls (L3SE)

=== Semi-finals ===
Date	Home	Score	Away
24/02/2018	Old Cranleighans (L3SW)	26–20	Portsmouth (L3SW)
24/02/2018	Trojans (L3SW)	7–27	Bromley (L3SE)

=== Final ===
The winners of the London & South East Senior Vase final would advance to the national semi-finals.

Date	Home	Score	Away
17/03/2018	Bromley (L3SE)	3–36	Old Cranleighans (L3SW)

== Midlands Senior Vase ==
The Midlands Senior Vase is a direct knockout cup with a 1st round, 2nd round, 3rd round, quarter-finals, semi-finals and final The winner of the final goes forward to the National Vase semi-finals where they face the winners of the Northern section. The competition involves 35 clubs from the following unions and level 8 leagues:

Union(s)	League(s) / Level	Participants
East Midlands	Midlands 3 East (South) (8)	8
Leicestershire	Midlands 3 East (North) (8)	3
Leicestershire	Midlands 3 East (South) (8)	2
North Midlands	Midlands 3 West (North) (8)	3
North Midlands	Midlands 3 West (South) (8)	3
Notts, Lincs & Derbyshire	Midlands 3 East (North) (8)	5
Staffordshire	Midlands 3 West (North) (8)	7
Warwickshire	Midlands 3 West (South) (8)	4

10 Midlands 3 West (North) 7 Midlands 3 West (South) 8 Midlands 3 East (North) 10 Midlands 3 East (South)

=== Round 1 ===
Byes: 32 teams were given a bye into the 2nd round

Date	Home	Score	Away
16/09/2017	Bromyard (M3WS)	AWO	Shrewsbury (M3WN)
16/09/2017	Shipston on Stour (M3WS)	39–3	Dunstablians (M3ES)
16/09/2017	Spalding (M3EN)	19–45	St Ives (M3ES)

=== Round 2 ===
Date	Home	Score	Away
07/10/2017	Alcester (M3WS)	29–60	Harborne (M3WN)
07/10/2017	Ashby (M3EN)	67–14	Trentham (M3WN)
07/10/2017	Bedford Queens (M3ES)	24–14	Old Coventrians (M3WS)
07/10/2017	Birstall (M3EN)	HWO	Northampton Mens Own (M3ES)
07/10/2017	Cannock (M3WN)	30–28	Leicester Forest (M3ES)
07/10/2017	Edwardians (M3WN)	15–38	Shipston on Stour (M3WS)
07/10/2017	Handsworth (M3WN)	32–31	Daventry (M3ES)
07/10/2017	Kesteven (M3EN)	HWO	Biggleswade (M3ES)
07/10/2017	Ledbury (M3WS)	HWO	Willenhall (M3WN)
07/10/2017	Northampton Casuals (M3ES)	HWO	Sileby Town (M3EN)
07/10/2017	Nottingham Moderns (M3EN)	22–12	Uttoxeter (M3WN)
07/10/2017	Rugby St Andrews (M3WS)	42–24	Stockwood Park (M3ES)
07/10/2017	Shrewsbury (M3WN)	59–0	Woodrush (M3WS) (Note: Despite initially losing their second round game against Shrewsbury, Woodrush were reinstated back into the Midlands Senior Vase after Shrewsbury were later disqualified for fielding an ineligible player.)
07/10/2017	St Ives (M3ES)	22–10	Sleaford (M3EN)
07/10/2017	Stafford (M3WN)	5–6	Long Eaton (M3EN)
07/10/2017	Vipers (M3ES)	58–0	Barton-Under-Needwood (M3WN)

=== Round 3 ===
Date	Home	Score	Away
28/10/2017	Harborne (M3WN)	24–28	Shipston on Stour (M3WS)
28/10/2017	Kesteven (M3EN)	21–41	St Ives (M3ES)
28/10/2017	Ledbury (M3WS)	44–35	Handsworth (M3WN)
28/10/2017	Long Eaton (M3EN)	HWO	Cannock (M3WN)
28/10/2017	Northampton Casuals (M3ES)	55–5	Birstall (M3EN)
28/10/2017	Rugby St Andrews (M3WS)	HWO	Bedford Queens (M3ES)
28/10/2017	Vipers (M3ES)	46–0	Nottingham Moderns (M3EN)
28/10/2017	Woodrush (M3WS)	HWO	Ashby (M3EN)

=== Quarter-finals ===
Date	Home	Score	Away
18/11/2017	Ledbury (M3WS)	14–32	Northampton Casuals (M3ES)
18/11/2017	Long Eaton (M3EN)	41–20	Woodrush (M3WS)
18/11/2017	Shipston on Stour (M3WS)	15–15 (Note: Vipers progressed by virtue of being the away team after the game finished dead-level after extra time, with both sides having scored 2 tries apiece.)	Vipers (M3ES)
18/11/2017	St Ives (M3ES)	69–12	Rugby St Andrews (M3WS)

=== Semi-finals ===
Date	Home	Score	Away
20/01/2018	Northampton Casuals (M3ES)	22–31	Long Eaton (M3EN)
20/01/2018	Vipers (M3ES)	8–10	St Ives (M3ES)

=== Final ===
The winners of the Midlands Senior Vase would advance to the National Senior Vase semi-finals.

Date	Home	Score	Away
17/03/2018	St Ives (M3ES)	19–8	Long Eaton (M3EN)

== Northern Senior Vase ==
Unlike the other regional competitions, the Northern Senior Vase starts with a mini-league stage, in which the eligible clubs are placed in 2 regional pools of 3 teams each. The winners of each pool then face each other in the Northern Senior Vase final, with the winner advancing to the National Senior Vase semi-finals, where they will face the winners of the Midlands section. There are 6 teams (1st XV only) involved in the Northern Senior Vase representing the following unions and level 8 leagues:

Union(s)	League(s) / Level	Participants
Durham County	Durham/Northumberland 2 (8)	1
Cheshire	Lancs/Cheshire Division 2 (8)	2 (Note: The breakaway of 19 Lancashire RFU clubs at the start of the 2017–18 season meant that no clubs from this union were involved in the RFU Senior Vase that year.)
Cumbria	Cumbria 1	1
Northumberland	Durham/Northumberland 2 (8)	1
Yorkshire	Yorkshire 2 (8)	1

=== Pool 1 (West) ===
Pool 1
	Club	Played	Won	Drawn	Lost	Points For	Points Against	Points Difference	Points
1	Winnington Park (LC2)	2	2	0	0	70	30	40	4
2	Liverpool Collegiate (LC2)	2	1	0	1	51	84	-33	2
3	Whitehaven (CL)	2	0	0	2	42	49	-7	0
2 points for a win, 1 point for a draw.

Date	Home	Score	Away
14/10/2017	Liverpool Collegiate (LC2)	34–29	Whitehaven (CL)
18/11/2017	Winnington Park (LC2)	55–17	Liverpool Collegiate (LC2)
17/02/2018	Whitehaven (LC2)	13–15	Winnington Park (LC2)

=== Pool 2 (East) ===
Pool 2
	Club	Played	Won	Drawn	Lost	Points For	Points Against	Points Difference	Points
1	Wath-upon-Dearne (Y2)	2	2	0	0	59	14	45	4
2	North Shields (DN2)	2	1	0	1	24	64	-40	2
3	Bishop Auckland (DN2)	2	0	0	2	5	10	-5	0
2 points for a win, 1 point for a draw.

Date	Home	Score	Away
14/10/2017	Wath-upon-Dearne (Y2)	59–14	North Shields (DN2)
18/11/2017	North Shields (DN2)	10–5	Bishop Auckland (DN2)
10/02/2018	Bishop Auckland (DN2)	AWO	Wath-upon-Dearne (Y2)

=== Final ===
The winners of the Pool 1 (West) and Pool 2 (East) would meet in the Northern Senior Vase final. The winners of this final would then advanced to the National Senior Vase semi-finals.

Date	Home	Score	Away
24/02/2018	Wath-upon-Dearne (Y2)	30–5	Winnington Park (LC2)

== South West Senior Vase ==
The South West Senior Vase consist of three stages, with representatives from the different unions joining at different points. The Dorset & Wilts and Gloucestershire clubs first play in county based knock-out tournaments, with the winners advancing to either the Southern Counties or South West Counties area semi-finals, where they join the other south-west representatives. The winners of each area final then meet in the South West Senior Vase final to determine who goes through to the national semi-finals, where they face the winners of the London and South East section.

The South West Senior Vase involves 27 clubs (1st XV only) from the following unions and level 8 leagues:

Union(s)	League(s) / Level	Participants
Berkshire	Berks/Bucks & Oxon Premier (8)	1
Buckinghamshire	Berks/Bucks & Oxon Premier (8)	1
Cornwall	Cornwall/Devon (8)	1
Devon	Cornwall/Devon (8)	1
Dorset & Wilts	Dorset & Wilts 1 North (8)	5
Dorset & Wilts	Dorset & Wilts 1 South (8)	5
Gloucestershire	Gloucester Premier (8)	11
Oxfordshire	Berks/Bucks & Oxon Premier (8)	1
Somerset	Somerset Premier (8)	1

=== Stage 1 (Dorset & Wilts) ===
10 clubs (1st XV only) were involved in the Dorset & Wilts RFU Senior Vase qualification. The winners would advanced to the Southern Counties semi-finals.

First Round
Date	Home	Score	Away
23/09/2017	Bridport (DW1S)	18–12	Melksham (DW1N)
23/09/2017	Pewsey Vale (DW1N)	5–23	Dorchester (DW1S)
Quarter-finals
14/10/2017	Bridport (DW1S)	HWO	Lytchett Minster (DW1S)
14/10/2017	Dorchester (DW1S)	HWO	Minety (DW1N)
14/10/2017	Supermarine (DW1N)	HWO	Bradford-on-Avon (DW1N)
14/10/2017	Weymouth & Portland (DW1S)	14–30	Oakmedians (DW1S)
Semi-finals
18/11/2017	Dorchester (DW1S)	HWO	Supermarine (DW1N)
18/11/2017	Oakmedians (DW1S)	65–10	Bridport (DW1S)
Final
02/12/2017	Dorchester (DW1S)	24–12	Oakmedians (DW1S)

=== Stage 1 (Gloucestershire) ===
11 teams were involved in the Gloucestershire RFU Senior Vase qualification tournament. The winners of the competition would go through to the South West Counties final.

First Round
Date	Home	Score	Away
02/09/2017	Gordon League (GP)	5–53	Longlevens (GP)
02/09/2017	Whitehall (GP)	36–28	Frampton Cotterell (GP)
16/09/2017	Cheltenham Saracens (GP)	36–38	Barton Hill (GP)
Quarter Finals
23/09/2017	Cirencester (GP)	33–20	Chipping Sodbury (GP)
23/09/2017	Spartans (GP)	15–17	Barton Hill (GP)
23/09/2017	St Mary's Old Boys (GP)	AWO	Longlevens (GP)
23/09/2017	Whitehall (GP)	15–22	Gloucester Old Boys (GP)
Semi-finals
07/10/2017	Barton Hill (GP)	36–5	Cirencester (GP)
14/10/2017	Longlevens (GP)	38–29	Gloucester Old Boys (GP)
Final
02/12/2017	Barton Hill (GP)	24–17	Longlevens (GP)

=== Stage 2 (Southern Counties) ===
The winners of the Dorset & Wilts Senior Vase would join representatives from the Berkshire, Buckinghamshire and Oxfordshire unions in the Southern Counties knock-out stage. The winners would advance to play the South West Counties winners in the south-west regional final.

Semi-finals
Date	Home	Score	Away
10/02/2018	Dorchester (DW1S)	HWO	Tadley (BBOP)
10/02/2018	Slough (BBOP)	HWO	Littlemore (BBOP)
Final
24/02/2018	Slough (BBOP)	16–14	Dorchester (DW1S)

=== Stage 2 (South West Counties) ===
The winners of the Gloucestershire Senior Vase would meet the representatives from the Somerset RFU in the semi-final, while the representatives from the Cornwall RFU would face the representatives from the Devon RFU. The winners would advance to play the Southern Counties winners in the south-west regional final.

Semi-finals
Date	Home	Score	Away
10/02/2018	Saltash (CD)	41–27	Withycombe (CD)
17/02/2018	Gordano (SP)	25–19	Barton Hill (GP)
Final
24/02/2018	Gordano (SP)	21–32	Saltash (CD)

=== Stage 3 (South West final) ===
The winners of the Southern Counties and South West Counties final would meet in the south-west regional final. The winners of this final would then advanced to the national semi-finals.

Date	Home	Score	Away
17/03/2018	Saltash (CD)	73–22	Slough (BBOP)

== National Senior Vase ==
4 teams qualified from the regional vase competitions:

- London & South East Senior Vase – Old Cranleighans (L3SW)
- Midlands Senior Vase – St Ives (M3ES)
- Northern Senior Vase – Wath-upon-Dearne (Y2)
- South West Senior Vase – Saltash (CD)

The Midlands winners would face the North winners in the first semi-final, while the London & South East winners would face the South-West winners in the other, with the winners of each semi-final meeting in the Twickenham final. Home advantage in the semi-finals will be decided by a draw.

=== Semi-finals ===
Date	Home	Score	Away
31/03/2018	Saltash (CD)	31–15	Old Cranleighans (L3SW)
31/03/2018	Wath-upon-Dearne (Y2)	29–7	St Ives (M3ES)

=== Final ===
6 May 2018
13:00

Saltash (CD)	18–22	Wath-upon-Dearne (Y2)
	Report

Twickenham Stadium, London
Referee: Thomas Davis

== See also ==
- 2017–18 Anglo-Welsh Cup
- 2017–18 British and Irish Cup
- 2017–18 RFU Intermediate Cup
- 2017–18 RFU Junior Vase
- RFU Intermediate Cup
- English rugby union system
- List of English rugby union teams
- Rugby union in England
