= Midlands 3 East (North) =

Rugby union league

Counties 2 Midlands East (North)
- Current season or competition: 2024–25 Counties 2 Midlands East (North)
- Sport: Rugby union
- Instituted: 1992; 34 years ago (as Midlands East 2)
- Number of teams: 12
- Country: England
- Most titles: Ashbourne, Ashby, Grimsby, Oakham (2 titles)
- Website: England RFU

Counties 2 Midlands East (North) (formerly Midlands 3 East (North)) is a level 8 English Rugby Union league and level 3 of the Midlands League, made up of teams from the northern part of the East Midlands region including clubs from Derbyshire, Lincolnshire, Nottinghamshire and the occasional team from Leicestershire, with home and away matches played throughout the season. When this division began in 1992 it was known as Midlands East 2, until it was split into two regional divisions called Midlands 4 East (North) and Midlands 4 East (South) ahead of the 2000–01 season. Further restructuring of the Midlands leagues ahead of the 2009–10 season, led to the current name of Midlands 3 East (North) and post the RFU's Adult Competition Review, from season 2022–23 it adopted its current name.

Promoted teams tend to move up to Counties 1 Midlands East (North) while demoted teams typically drop into Counties 3 Midlands East North West or Counties 3 Midlands East North East.

== 2026-27 ==
Departing were Mansfield and Syston II, promoted to Counties 1 Midlands East (North) as champions and runners-up respectively.

West Bridgford II (10th) were relegated to Counties 3 Midlands East (North West) while Sleaford (11th) and Gainsborough (12th) were relegated to Counties 3 Midlands East (North East).

=== Participating teams & locations ===
Team	Ground	Capacity	City/Area	Previous season
Ashby	Nottingham Road		Ashby-de-la-Zouch, Leicestershire	Relegated from Counties 1 Midlands East (North) (12th)
Belper	Strutts Playing Field		Belper, Derbyshire	Promoted from Counties 3 Midlands East (North West)
Boston	Princess Royal Sports Arena	2,000	Boston, Lincolnshire	Promoted from Counties 3 Midlands East (North East)
Coalville	Memorial Ground		Coalville, Leicestershire	7th
Kesteven	Woodnook		Grantham, Lincolnshire	Relegated from Counties 1 Midlands East (North) (10th)
Loughborough	Derby Road Playing Fields		Loughborough, Leicestershire	5th
Melton Mowbray	Melton Sports Village		Melton Mowbray, Leicestershire	4th
Mosborough	Mosborough Miners Welfare Club		Mosborough, Sheffield, South Yorkshire	8th
Nottingham Casuals	Weir Field Recreation Ground		Beeston, Nottingham, Nottinghamshire	6th
Nottingham Moderns	Ferryfields		Wilford, Nottingham, Nottinghamshire	Relegated from Counties 1 Midlands East (North) (11th)
Scunthorpe II	Heslam Park	1,212 (212 seats)	Scunthorpe, Lincolnshire	3rd
Tupton	North Side		Tupton, Derbyshire	9th

Locations of the 2026-27 Counties 2 Midlands East (North) teams

== 2025–26 ==
Departing were Keyworth and Ashby, promoted to Counties 1 Midlands East (North) as champions and runners-up respectively.

With a reorganisation of the leagues below, a greater than usual number of clubs were relegated meaning Boston (8th) and Newark II (11th) were relegated to Counties 3 Midlands East (North East) together with Birstall (9th) relegated to Counties 3 Midlands East (South North), while Derby II (10th) and Ashfield (12th) were relegated to Counties 3 Midlands East (North West).

Ashbourne (3rd) left on a level transfer to Counties 2 Midlands West (West).

=== Participating teams & locations ===
Team	Ground	Capacity	City/Area	Previous season
Coalville	Memorial Ground		Coalville, Leicestershire	Level transfer from Counties 2 Midlands West (East) (3rd)
Gainsborough	Roses Sports Fields		Gainsborough, Lincolnshire	7th
Loughborough	Derby Road Playing Fields		Loughborough, Leicestershire	Relegated from Counties 1 Midlands East (North)
Mansfield	Eakring Road	1,000	Mansfield, Nottinghamshire	Relegated from Counties 1 Midlands East (North)
Melton Mowbray	Melton Sports Village		Melton Mowbray, Leicestershire	5th
Mosborough	Mosborough Miners Welfare Club		Mosborough, Sheffield, South Yorkshire	6th
Nottingham Casuals	Weir Field Recreation Ground		Beeston, Nottingham, Nottinghamshire	4th
Scunthorpe II	Heslam Park	1,212 (212 seats)	Scunthorpe, Lincolnshire	New entry
Sleaford	David Williams Pavilion		Sleaford, Lincolnshire	Promoted from Counties 3 Midlands East (North East)
Syston II	Barkby Road		Queniborough, Leicestershire	Promoted from Counties 3 Midlands West (East) (champions)
Tupton	North Side		Tupton, Derbyshire	Promoted from Counties 3 Midlands East (North West)
West Bridgford II	The Memorial Ground		West Bridgford, Nottinghamshire	New entry

Locations of the 2025–26 Counties 2 Midlands East (North) teams

== 2024–25 ==
Departing were Kesteven and Nottingham Moderns, both promoted to Counties 1 Midlands East (North). Grimsby and Belper were relegated.

Joining were Boston and Birstall, relegated from Counties 1 Midlands East (North). Keyworth were promoted from Counties 3 Midlands East (Central) whilst Mosborough came up from Counties 3 Midlands East (North).

=== Participating teams & locations ===
Team	Ground	Capacity	City/Area	Previous season
Ashbourne	Recreation Ground		Ashbourne, Derbyshire	3rd
Ashby	Nottingham Road		Ashby-de-la-Zouch, Leicestershire	10th
Ashfield	Polly Bowls Sports Ground		Sutton in Ashfield, Nottinghamshire	7th
Birstall	Co-Op Sports Ground		Birstall, Leicestershire	Relegated from Counties 1 Midlands East (North)
Boston	Princess Royal Sports Arena	2,000	Boston, Lincolnshire	Relegated from Counties 1 Midlands East (North)
Derby II	Haslams Lane		Derby, Derbyshire	5th
Gainsborough	Roses Sports Fields		Gainsborough, Lincolnshire	9th
Keyworth	Willoughby Road		Widmerpool, Nottinghamshire	Promoted from Counties 3 Midlands East (Central) (champions)
Melton Mowbray	Melton Sports Village		Melton Mowbray, Leicestershire	4th
Mosborough	Mosborough Miners Welfare Club		Mosborough, Sheffield, South Yorkshire	Promoted from Counties 3 Midlands East (North) (champions)
Newark II	The Rugby Ground	1,000 (60 seats)	Newark-on-Trent, Nottinghamshire	8th
Nottingham Casuals	Weir Field Recreation Ground		Beeston, Nottingham, Nottinghamshire	6th

Locations of the 2024–25 Counties 2 Midlands East (North) teams

== 2023–24 ==
Departing were Boston and Mansfield, both promoted to Counties 1 Midlands East (North). Bakewell Mannerians (10th), East Retford (11th) and Sielby (12th) were relegated.

Joining were Asbourne and Ashby, relegated from Counties 1 Midlands East (North). Newark II were promoted from Counties 3 Midlands East (N) East whilst Derby II came up from Counties 3 Midlands East (N) West. Melton Mowbray joined on a level transfer from Counties 2 Midlands East (South).

=== Participating teams & locations ===
Team	Ground	Capacity	City/Area	Previous season
Ashbourne	Recreation Ground		Ashbourne, Derbyshire	Relegated from Counties 1 Midlands East (North)
Ashby	Nottingham Road		Ashby-de-la-Zouch, Leicestershire	Relegated from Counties 1 Midlands East (North)
Ashfield	Polly Bowls Sports Ground		Sutton in Ashfield, Nottinghamshire	7th
Belper	Strutts Playing Field		Belper, Derbyshire	9th
Derby II	Haslams Lane		Derby, Derbyshire	Promoted from Counties 3 Midlands East (N) West (champions)
Gainsborough	Roses Sports Fields		Gainsborough, Lincolnshire	6th
Grimsby	Springfield		Grimsby, Lincolnshire	8th
Kesteven	Woodnook		Grantham, Lincolnshire	4th
Melton Mowbray	Melton Sports Village		Melton Mowbray, Leicestershire	Level transfer from Counties 2 Midlands East (South) (6th)
Newark II	The Rugby Ground	1,000 (60 seats)	Newark-on-Trent, Nottinghamshire	Promoted from Counties 3 Midlands East (N) East (champions)
Nottingham Casuals	Weir Field Recreation Ground		Beeston, Nottingham, Nottinghamshire	3rd
Nottingham Moderns	Ferryfields		Wilford, Nottingham, Nottinghamshire	5th

Locations of the 2023–24 Counties 2 Midlands East (North) teams

== 2022–23 ==
This was the first season following the RFU Adult Competition Review with the league adopting its new name of Counties 2 Midlands East (North)).

Departing were Mellish and Birstall, both promoted to Counties 1 Milands East (North).

Joining were Gainsborough and Nottingham Moderns, both promoted.

=== Participating teams & locations ===
Team	Ground	Capacity	City/Area	Previous season
Ashfield	Polly Bowls Sports Ground		Sutton in Ashfield, Nottinghamshire	9th
Bakewell Mannerians	Lady Manners School		Bakewell, Derbyshire	8th
Belper	Strutts Playing Field		Belper, Derbyshire	10th
Boston	Princess Royal Sports Arena	2,000	Boston, Lincolnshire	5th
East Retford	Ordsall Road		Retford, Nottinghamshire	12th
Gainsborough	Roses Sports Fields		Gainsborough, Lincolnshire	Promoted from Midlands 4 EN (East)
Grimsby	Springfield		Grimsby, Lincolnshire	7th
Kesteven	Woodnook		Grantham, Lincolnshire	4th
Mansfield	Eakring Road	1,000	Mansfield, Nottinghamshire	6th
Nottingham Casuals	Weir Field Recreation Ground		Beeston, Nottingham, Nottinghamshire	3rd
Nottingham Moderns	Ferryfields		Wilford, Nottingham, Nottinghamshire	Promoted from Midlands 4 EN (West)
Sileby	Platts Lane		Cossington, Leicestershire	11th

Locations of the 2022–23 Counties 2 Midlands East (North) teams

== 2021–22 ==
The teams competing in 2021–22 achieved their places in the league based on performances in 2019–20, the 'previous season' column in the table below refers to that season not 2020–21.

Buxton (4th) in 2019-20 did not return for the new season.

=== Participating teams & locations ===
Team	Ground	Capacity	City/Area	Previous season
Ashfield	Polly Bowls Sports Ground		Sutton in Ashfield, Nottinghamshire	Relegated from Midlands 2 EN (12th)
Bakewell Mannerians	Lady Manners School		Bakewell, Derbyshire	8th
Belper	Strutts Playing Field		Belper, Derbyshire	7th
Birstall	Co-Op Sports Ground		Birstall, Leicestershire	Promoted from Midlands 4 ES (champions)
Boston	Princess Royal Sports Arena	2,000	Boston, Lincolnshire	Promoted from Midlands 4 EN (champions)
East Retford	Ordsall Road		Retford, Nottinghamshire	Promoted from Midlands 4 EN (runners-up)
Grimsby	Springfield		Grimsby, Lincolnshire	5th
Kesteven	Woodnook		Grantham, Lincolnshire	6th
Mansfield	Eakring Road	1,000	Mansfield, Nottinghamshire	9th
Mellish	War Memorial Ground		Arnold, Nottingham, Nottinghamshire	3rd
Nottingham Casuals	Weir Field Recreation Ground		Beeston, Nottingham, Nottinghamshire	Relegated from Midlands 2 EN (11th)
Sileby	Platts Lane		Cossington, Leicestershire	10th

Locations of the 2021–22 Midlands 3 East (North) teams

== 2020–21 ==
Due to the COVID-19 pandemic, the 2020–21 season was cancelled.

== 2019–20 ==
=== Participating teams & locations ===
Team	Ground	Capacity	City/Area	Previous season
Ashby	Nottingham Road		Ashby-de-la-Zouch, Leicestershire	Relegated from Midlands 2 EN (12th)
Bakewell Mannerians	Lady Manners School		Bakewell, Derbyshire	10th
Belper	Strutts Playing Field		Belper, Derbyshire	4th
Buxton	Sunnyfields		Buxton, Derbyshire	6th
Grimsby	Springfield		Grimsby, Lincolnshire	Promoted from Midlands 4 EN (champions)
Kesteven	Woodnook		Grantham, Lincolnshire	5th
Mansfield	Eakring Road	1,000	Mansfield, Nottinghamshire	9th
Mellish	War Memorial Ground		Arnold, Nottingham, Nottinghamshire	Promoted from Midlands 4 EN (runners up)
Nottingham Moderns	Ferryfields		Wilford, Nottingham, Nottinghamshire	7th
Rolls-Royce	Moor Lane		Derby, Derbyshire	8th
Sileby	Platts Lane		Cossington, Leicestershire	Promoted from Midlands 4 ES (runners up)
Southwell	Pentelowes		Southwell, Nottinghamshire	Relegated from Midlands 2 EN (11th)

Locations of the 2019–20 Midlands 3 East (North) teams

== 2018–19 ==
=== Participating teams & locations ===
Team	Ground	Capacity	City/Area	Previous season
Ashfield	Polly Bowls Sports Ground		Sutton in Ashfield, Nottinghamshire	Promoted from Midlands 4 East (North) (champions)
Bakewell Mannerians	Lady Manners School		Bakewell, Derbyshire	Relegated from Midlands 2 East (North) (12th)
Belper	Strutts Playing Field		Belper, Derbyshire	9th
Buxton	Sunnyfields		Buxton, Derbyshire	10th
Kesteven	Woodnook		Grantham, Lincolnshire	5th
Mansfield	Eakring Road	1,000	Mansfield, Nottinghamshire	3rd
Nottingham Casuals	Weir Field Recreation Ground		Beeston, Nottingham, Nottinghamshire	Relegated from Midlands 2 East (North) (11th)
Nottingham Moderns	Ferryfields		Wilford, Nottingham, Nottinghamshire	11th
Rolls-Royce	Moor Lane		Derby, Derbyshire	4th
Sleaford	David Williams Pavilion		Sleaford, Lincolnshire	6th
Spalding	Memorial Field		Spalding, Lincolnshire	8th
Tupton	North Side		Tupton, Derbyshire	Promoted from Midlands 4 East (North) (runners up)

Locations of the 2018–19 Midlands 3 East (North) teams

== 2017–18 ==
=== Participating teams & locations ===
Team	Ground	Capacity	City/Area	Previous season
Ashby	Nottingham Road		Ashby-de-la-Zouch, Leicestershire	5th
Belper	Strutts Playing Field		Belper, Derbyshire	3rd
Birstall	Co-Op Sports Ground		Birstall, Leicestershire	9th
Buxton	Sunnyfields		Buxton, Derbyshire	4th
Grimsby	Springfield		Grimsby, Lincolnshire	10th
Kesteven	Woodnook		Grantham, Lincolnshire	Relegated from Midlands 2 East (North) (11th)
Long Eaton	West Park	1,000	Long Eaton, Derbyshire	Promoted from Midlands 4 East (North) (champions)
Mansfield	Eakring Road	1,000	Mansfield, Nottinghamshire	7th
Nottingham Moderns	Ferryfields		Wilford, Nottingham, Nottinghamshire	Promoted from Midlands 4 East (North) (runners up)
Rolls-Royce	Moor Lane		Derby, Derbyshire	8th
Sileby Town	Platts Lane		Cossington, Leicestershire	Level transfer from Midlands 3 East (South)
Sleaford	David Williams Pavilion		Sleaford, Lincolnshire	5th
Spalding	Memorial Field		Spalding, Lincolnshire	Relegated from Midlands 2 East (North) (12th)

Locations of the 2017–18 Midlands 3 East (North) teams

== Teams 2016–17 ==
- Ashby
- Ashfield
- Bakewell Mannerians (relegated from Midlands 2 East)
- Belper
- Birstall (promoted from Midlands 4 East (North))
- Buxton (promoted from Midlands 4 East (North))
- Chesterfield Panthers
- Grimsby
- Lincoln
- Mansfield (relegated from Midlands 2 East)
- Rolls-Royce (promoted from Midlands 4 East (North))
- Sleaford

== Teams 2015–16 ==
- Ashby (relegated from Midlands 2 East (North))
- Ashfield (promoted from Midlands 4 East (North))
- Aylestone St James
- Belper (promoted from Midlands 4 East (North))
- Boston
- Chesterfield Panthers
- Grimsby
- Kesteven
- Lincoln
- Loughborough (relegated from Midlands 2 East (North))
- Nottingham Moderns
- Sleaford

== Teams 2014–15 ==
- Amber Valley (promoted from Midlands 4 East (North))
- Aylestone St James
- Boston
- Chesterfield Panthers (promoted from Midlands 4 East (North))
- Grimsby
- Kesteven (relegated from Midlands 2 East (North))
- Lincoln
- Mellish
- Melton Mowbray
- Nottingham Moderns RFC
- Sleaford
- Southwell

== Teams 2013–14 ==
- Ashby
- Aylestone St James (relegated from Midlands 2 East (North))
- Boston (promoted from Midlands 4 East (North))
- East Retford
- Grimsby
- Lincoln
- Mellish
- Nottingham Moderns
- Skegness (promoted from Midlands 4 East (North))
- Sleaford (relegated from Midlands 2 East (North))
- Southwell
- West Bridgford

== Teams 2012–13 ==
- Amber Valley
- Ashby
- Belper
- East Retford (promoted from Midlands 4 East (North))
- Grimsby
- Kesteven
- Lincoln
- Melbourne
- Mellish
- Nottingham Moderns (relegated from Midlands 2 East (North))
- Southwell (promoted from Midlands 4 East (North))
- West Bridgford RFC (relegated from Midlands 2 East (North))

== Teams 2011–12 ==
- Amber Valley
- Ashby
- Belper
- Dronfield
- Grimsby
- Kesteven
- Lincoln
- Melbourne
- Mellish
- Nottingham Boots Corsairs
- Sleaford
- Worksop

== Teams 2010–11 ==
- Amber Valley
- Ashbourne
- Ashfield
- Dronfield (promoted from Midlands 4 East (North))
- Grimsby
- Kesteven
- Melbourne
- Mellish
- Nottingham Casuals
- Sleaford
- Southwell
- Worksop

== Teams 2008–09 ==
- Ashbourne
- Bakewell Mannerians
- Coalville
- Grimsby
- Ilkeston
- Lincoln
- Loughborough
- Melton Mowbray
- Nottingham Moderns
- Sleaford
- Spalding
- West Bridgford

== Original teams ==
Teams in Midlands 3 East (North) and Midlands 3 East (South) were originally part of a single division called Midlands 2 East, which contained the following sides when it was introduced in 1992:

- Coalville - promoted from East Midlands/Leicestershire (6th)
- Glossop - promoted from Notts, Lincs & Derbyshire 1 (6th)
- Kesteven - promoted from Notts, Lincs & Derbyshire 1 (9th)
- Kettering - promoted from East Midlands/Leicestershire (7th)
- Lincoln - promoted from Notts, Lincs & Derbyshire 1 (10th)
- Long Buckby - promoted from East Midlands 1 (champions)
- Lutterworth - promoted from East Midlands/Leicestershire (10th)
- Market Rasen & Louth - promoted from Notts, Lincs & Derbyshire 2 (runners up)
- Northampton BBOB - promoted from East Midlands/Leicestershire (9th)
- South Leicester - promoted from Leicestershire 1 (champions)
- Southwell - promoted from Notts, Lincs & Derbyshire 1 (7th)
- Stamford - promoted from Notts, Lincs & Derbyshire 1 (8th)
- Wellingborough - promoted from East Midlands/Leicestershire (8th)
- Worksop - promoted from Notts, Lincs & Derbyshire 2 (champions)

== Midlands 3 East (North) honours ==
=== Midlands East 2 (1992–1993) ===
Midlands 3 East (North) and Midlands 3 East (South) were originally part of a single tier 8 division called Midlands East 2. Promotion was to Midlands East 1 and relegation was to either East Midlands/Leicestershire 1 or Notts, Lincs & Derbyshire 1.

Midlands East 2
Season	No. of teams	Champions	Runners-up	Relegated teams	Reference
1992–93	14	Kettering	Northampton BBOB	Glossop, Southwell, Market Rasen & Louth, Stamford	
Green backgrounds are the promotion places.

=== Midlands East 2 (1993–1996) ===
The top six teams from Midlands 1 and the top six from North 1 were combined to create National 5 North, meaning that Midlands 2 East dropped to become a tier 9 league. Promotion continued to Midlands East 1 while relegation was to either East Midlands/Leicestershire 1 or Notts, Lincs & Derbyshire 1.

Midlands East 2
Season	No. of teams	Champions	Runners-up	Relegated teams	Reference
1993–94	13	Long Buckby	Wellingborough	Dronfield, Kesteven	
1994–95	13	Ilkeston	Huntingdon & District	Worksop, Grimsby, Luton	
1995–96	13	Lutterworth	Old Northamptonians (Note: Due to the cancellation of National 5 North at the end of the season, eight clubs were promoted including Lincoln, Wellingborough, Nottingham Moderns, Ashbourne, Northampton BBOB and Coalville.)	No relegation (Note: Due to widespread restructuring caused by the cancellation of National 5 North there was no relegation.)	
Green backgrounds are the promotion places.

=== Midlands East 2 (1996–2000) ===
At the end of the 1995–96 season National 5 North was discontinued and Midlands East 2 returned to being a tier 8 league. Promotion continued to Midlands East 1 while relegation was to either East Midlands/Leicestershire 1 or Notts, Lincs & Derbyshire 1.

Midlands East 2
Season	No. of teams	Champions	Runners-up	Relegated teams	Reference
1996–97	17	Northampton Men's Own	Northampton Old Scouts	Chesterfield Panthers, East Retford, Mellish	
1997–98	17	Dunstablians	Oadby Wyggestonian	Bedford Queens, Northampton BBOB	
1998–99	17	Luton	South Leicester	Nottingham Casuals, Biggleswade	
1999–2000	17	Market Bosworth (Note: Champions Market Bosworth would be promoted into the new Midlands 3 East (North).)	Long Eaton (Note: Due to Midlands league restructuring five clubs would be promoted including Glossop (3rd) and Loughborough who would go up into Midlands 3 East (North), while Vipers (4th) would go up into Midlands 3 East (South).)	No relegation (Note: As Midlands East 2 was due to split up into two regional leagues there was no relegation. Clubs that were not promoted were transferred into either Midlands 4 East (North) or Midlands 4 East (South).)	
Green backgrounds are the promotion places.

=== Midlands 4 East (North) (2000–2006) ===
Restructuring ahead of the 2000–01 season saw Midlands East 2 split into two tier 8 regional leagues - Midlands 4 East (North) and Midlands 4 East (South). Promotion was now to Midlands 3 East (North) (Note: Prior to the 2000–01 season Midlands 3 East (North) and Midlands 3 East (South) were part of a Midlands East 1.) and relegation to either Notts, Lincs & Derbyshire/Leicestershire 1 East or Notts, Lincs & Derbyshire/Leicestershire 1 West. (Note: Prior to the 2000–01 season, teams from Notts, Lincs & Derbyshire/Leicestershire 1 East and Notts, Lincs & Derbyshire/Leicestershire 1 West were part of either East Midlands/Leicestershire 1 or Notts, Lincs & Derbyshire 1.)

Midlands East 4 East (North)
Season	No. of teams	Champions	Runners-up	Relegated teams	Reference
2000–01	10	Matlock	Market Rasen & Louth	Worksop, Ashfield, Belper	
2001–02	10	Loughborough Students	Paviors	Melbourne, East Retford, Amber Valley	
2002–03	10	Mellish	West Bridgford	Ashfield, Long Eaton	
2003–04	10	Grimsby	Lincoln	Buxton	
2004–05	10	Oakham	Ashfield	Nottingham Casuals, East Leake	
2005–06	10	Ashbourne	Sleaford	No relegation (Note: No relegation as the division would be increased from 10 to 12 teams for the following season.)	
Green backgrounds are promotion places.

=== Midlands 4 East (North) (2006–2009) ===
Midlands 4 East (North) continued to be a tier 8 league with promotion up into Midlands 3 East (North). However, the cancellation of Notts, Lincs & Derbyshire/Leicestershire 1 East and Notts, Lincs & Derbyshire/Leicestershire 1 West at the end of the 2005–06 season meant that relegation was now to the newly introduced Midlands 5 East (North).

Midlands East 4 East (North)
Season	No. of teams	Champions	Runners-up	Relegated teams	Reference
2006–07	12	Grimsby	West Bridgford	Chesterfield Panthers, East Retford	
2007–08	12	Bakewell Mannerians	Ashbourne	Castle Donington	
2008–09	12	Market Rasen & Louth	Belgrave	No relegation (Note: No relegation as the division would be increased from 11 to 12 teams for the following season.)	
Green backgrounds are promotion places.

=== Midlands 3 East (North) (2009–present) ===
League restructuring by the RFU meant that Midlands 4 East (North) and Midlands 4 East (South) were renamed as Midlands 3 East (North) and Midlands 3 East (South), with both leagues remaining at tier 8. Promotion was now to Midlands 2 East (North) (formerly Midlands 3 East (North)) and relegation to Midlands 4 East (North) (formerly Midlands 5 East (North)).

Midlands East 3 (North)
Season	No. of teams	Champions	Runners-up	Relegated teams	Reference
2009–10	11	Oakham	Ashby	Boston	
2010–11	12	Ashbourne	Nottingham Casuals	Ashfield, Southwell	
2011–12	12	Dronfield	Sleaford	Nottingham Corsairs, Worksop	
2012–13	12	Melbourne	Kesteven	Amber Valley, Belper	
2013–14	12	Ashby	West Bridgford	Skegness, East Retford	
2014–15	12	Melton Mowbray	Southwell	Mellish, Amber Valley	M
2015–16	12	Kesteven	Loughborough	Nottingham Moderns, Boston	
2016–17	12	Lincoln	Bakewell Mannerians	Chesterfield Panthers, Ashfield	
2017–18	13	Long Eaton	Ashby	Grimsby, Sileby Town	
2018–19	12	Nottingham Casuals	Ashfield	Tupton, Sleaford	
2019–20	12	Ashby	Southwell	Rolls-Royce, Nottingham Moderns	
2020–21	12				
Green backgrounds are promotion places.

== Number of league titles ==
- Ashbourne (2)
- Ashby (2)
- Grimsby (2)
- Oakham (2)
- Bakewell Mannerians (1)
- Dronfield (1)
- Dunstablians (1) (Note: Dunstablians title was when league was single division known as Midlands East 2.)
- Ilkeston (1) (Note: Ilkeston's title was when league was single division known as Midlands East 2.)
- Kesteven (1)
- Kettering (1) (Note: Kettering's title was when league was single division known as Midlands East 2.)
- Lincoln (1)
- Long Buckby (1) (Note: Long Buckby's title was when league was single division known as Midlands East 2.)
- Long Eaton (1)
- Loughborough Students (1)
- Lutterworth (1) (Note: Lutterworth's title was when league was single division known as Midlands East 2.)
- Luton (1) (Note: Luton's title was when league was single division known as Midlands East 2.)
- Market Bosworth (1) (Note: Market Bosworth's title was when league was single division known as Midlands East 2.)
- Market Rasen & Louth (1)
- Matlock (1)
- Melbourne (1)
- Mellish (1)
- Melton Mowbray (1)
- Northampton Men's Own (1) (Note: Northampton Men's Own title was when league was single division known as Midlands East 2.)
- Nottingham Casuals (1)

== See also ==
- Midlands RFU
- Leicestershire RU
- Notts, Lincs & Derbyshire RFU
- English rugby union system
- Rugby union in England
