= Grimsby RUFC =

English rugby union club, based in Grimsby

(England) Grimsby RUFC
- Full name: Grimsby Rugby Union Football Club
- Union: Notts, Lincs & Derbyshire RFU
- Founded: 1885; 141 years ago
- Location: Grimsby, Lincolnshire, England
- Ground: Springfield
- League: Midlands 3 East (North)
- 2019–20: 5th
Team kit

Official website
- www.pitchero.com/clubs/grimsbyrufc

Grimsby Rugby Union Football Club is an English rugby union team based in Grimsby, North East Lincolnshire. The first XV currently plays in Midlands 3 East (North) following the club's promotion from Midlands 4 East (North) as champions at the end of the 2018–19 season. The club runs three senior sides and five junior sides. They currently hold the record for most titles in Midlands 3 East (North) with two titles (equalling the records of Oakham and Ashbourne).

== History ==
Grimsby RUFC was founded in 1885, with Walter Alford Green being appointed as the club's first president. The new club played their first game against Hull and East Riding RUFC. Grimsby went on to lose this game. The club formed on a proper basis in January 1923. The first game as an official club was played away at Gainsborough. Grimsby won the game by 31 points to 5. Many of the club's early home games were played at Charlton's, on Littlefield Lane.

The club managed to secure their own pitch a little while later, at Fairfield in the Scartho area of Grimsby. After this, the club played Gainsborough again, this time at home. Grimsby won this match too, by 62 points to zero. This game was watched by over 2,000 spectators.

The club changed grounds many times after the Second World War. First, they played on land at the bottom of Peakes Lane. They then moved to the land on Barratts Recreation Ground, behind the Scartho Road Swimming Pool. It was decided that the club needed a new ground in 1961 however, and after a large amount of fundraising by club members, and help from the Earl of Yarborough, the club moved to its current location of Springfield.

== Honours ==
- Notts, Lincs & Derbyshire 1 champions: 1992–93
- Midlands 4 East (North) champions: 2018–19

== Personnel ==
=== Club Officials ===
- President: (England) Ian Macdonald
- Chairperson: (England) Andy Picking
- Junior Chairman: (England) Richard Woodward
- Director of Rugby/Head Coach: (England) Stu Saunders
- Coach: (England) Matt Searle
- Coach: (England) Chris Garstin
- Coach: (England) Chris Clifton

=== Past Captains ===
Year	Captain
2010-11	(England) Neil Corry
2009-10	(England) Stuart Saunders
2006-09	(England) Neil Corry
2005-06	(England) Ben Pharaoh
2004-05	(England) Darren Edwards
2003-04	(England) Ben Pharaoh
2002-03	(England) Jan Slosmanis
2000-02	(England) L. Chambers
1998-00	(England) Jan Slosmanis
1996-98	(England) N. Farquharson
1995-96	(England) G. Smith
1994-95	(England) R. Easton
1991-94	(England) R. Smith
1990-91	(England) S. Robinson
1989-90	(England) M. Lambert
1986-88	(England) D. Armstrong
1985-86	(England) P. Wallis
