= Boston RFC (England) =

- Full name: Boston Rugby Football Club
- Founded: 1927; 99 years ago
- Ground: Princess Royal Sports Arena (Capacity: 2,000)
- Chairman: Russell 'Rusty' Wright
- Coach: Jed Chappell
- League: Counties 3 Midlands East (North East)
- 2025-26: Champions (promotion from Counties 3 Midlands East (North East))
Team kit

Official website
- bostonrfc.rfu.club

Boston Rugby Football Club is a rugby union club from Boston, Lincolnshire. Boston Rugby Club was founded in 1927 by Ernst Clark, a gentleman with an interest in giving his boys and their friends something to do, or rather something to keep them out of trouble.

The first 'home' pitch was off Rosebery Avenue in Mountains Field, an unused plot of farmland and the players turned out in blue and white hooped shirts, as they still do. After match entertainment was at the White Hart Hotel. The hotel provided changing facilities which were an old shed out the back which included a tin tank bath. However, this did not unhinge the players as they served a fine pint of Worthington 'E'! It was like drinking dynamite - a drop so powerful that Boston people could only drink it in 1/2 pints. Visitors however drunk pints and were worse for wear very quickly. In 1998 Boston Rugby Club proposed a project that would improve the development of sports within the community. The idea was to build a new facility that would house not only rugby and athletics but would also be fully accessible to people with a disability. Boston Rugby Club produced initial proposals for the enhanced facilities and these proposals were endorsed by the Borough Council in April 1998. Working in partnership with the local authority; the Rugby Club and Boston & District Athletic Club formed the 'Disabled and Able-bodied British Sports Initiative' which operated under the name of dabsi. Work soon commenced on the first phase of the project with the help of major sponsor Finnforest, a global timber manufacturer whose UK base is in Boston. The second phase of the project saw the development of the Rugby Club area and the whole development was opened by the Princess Royal and is now known as the Princess Royal Sports Arena.

== Club Honours ==
- Midlands 5 East (North) champions: 2011-12
- Midlands 4 East (North) champions (2): 2012-13, 2019–20
- Counties 2 Midlands East (North): 2022-23
- Solstice 7s Plate champions: 2018
- Rockcliff Super 10s Plate champions: 2019

== Current squad ==
- Paul Beard (HK)
- Will Scupham (HK)
- Lewis Himsworth (HK)
- Jack Bell (HK)
- Alex Hough (PR)
- Antony Buckberry (PR)
- Sam Johnson (PR)
- Joe Deamer (PR)
- Ian Sampson (PR)
- James Griffin (PR)
- Adam Cock (PR)
- Lewis Eldin (LK) (Captain)
- Matthew Deane (LK)
- Matthew Coley (LK)
- Nigel Lane (LK)
- Henry Betts (LK)
- David Cotton-Betteridge (FL)
- Russell Wright (FL)
- Jack Wright (FL)
- George Sharpe (FL)
- Sam Lempard (FL)
- Adam Overton (FL)
- Luke Fowler (FL)
- Marc Miles (FL)
- Diogo Felicio (FL)
- Jack Stokes (N8)
- Adam Overton (N8)
- Peter Manning (N8)
- Louis Williams (N8)
- Jake Blanchard (N8)
- Sam Gray (SH)
- Josh Cook (SH)
- Gareth Short (SH)
- Robert Borley (SH)
- Matthew Bray (FH)
- Rowan Mason (FH)
- Tom Balderstone (FH)
- Stephen Kippax (FH)
- Dan Halliday (CE)
- Danny Wilson (CE)
- Harry Woods (CE)
- Michael Baldwin (CE)
- Jamie Jenkins (CE)
- Jaron Cowern (WG)
- George Baldwin (WG)
- Perry Cumber (WG)
- Chris Cook (WG)
- Dan Piggins (WG)
- Bruno Hall (FB)
- John Hummel (FB)
- Tom Hobbs (FB)
- Kyle Turley (FB)
