= Chesterfield Panthers RUFC =

English rugby union club

(England) Chesterfield Panthers
- Full name: Chesterfield Panthers Rugby Union Football Club
- Union: Notts, Lincs & Derbyshire RFU
- Founded: 2008; 17 years ago
- Location: Chesterfield, Derbyshire, England
- Ground: Dunston Road
- Chairman: (England)
- Coach(es): Lee Whitmore, Charlie Davies, Gerraint Davies, John Jefferson
- Captain: 1st Team - Adam Uprichard - 2nd Team - Alex Tustin
- League: Midlands 4 East (North)
- 2019–20: 7th

Official website
- www.pitchero.com/clubs/chesterfieldpanthers

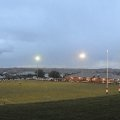
New facilities at Dunston Road

Chesterfield Panthers is an English rugby union club. They play in the lower tiers of the Midlands Division, currently participating in Midlands Division 4 East (North).

== History ==
Chesterfield Panthers was formed in 2008 following the merger of Chesterfield RUFC and North Derbyshire RUFC. The move, which has the full support of the RFU, heralded the formation of one stronger club in the area of Chesterfield and North East Derbyshire.

The Panthers made their lair at Sheffield Road, Stonegravels at the ground previously used by the Chesterfield club and fielded Senior Men's and Ladies' teams in the RFU league and cup competitions for the coming season.

In November 2012 new playing facilities were established at a new venue followed in July 2013 by a new clubhouse at 2012 Dunston Road, 2.5 north of the town centre. This was the culmination of 2 decades of planning and over £1.8m capital spending.

The Men's 1st XV team joined Midlands 5 East (North) and subsequently won promotion to Midlands 4 East (North). In the first season (2013/14) at the new site, the Men's 1st XV earned promotion to Midlands 3 East (North) by winning the Championship after 20 wins, 1 draw and only one loss over the whole season.

The club fields senior male and female squads plus a burgeoning number of youth teams.

== Club Honours ==
- Notts, Lincs & Derbyshire 1 champions (2): 1989–90, 1991–92
- Notts, Lincs & Derbyshire/Leicestershire 2 West champions: 2003–04
- Midlands 4 East (North) champions: 2013–14

== Notable former players ==
- Ross McMillan (Northampton Saints, Leicester Tigers, Bristol Bears and current London Irish coach)
- Alexander Obolensky (first England player to score 2 tries against the All Blacks)
- Charlie Davies (Northampton Saints, Wasps, Stade Francais, Newport and Gwent Dragons)
