= Nottingham Moderns RFC =

Rugby union club in Nottinghamshire, England

Nottingham Moderns
- Full name: Nottingham Moderns Rugby Football Club
- Union: Notts, Lincs & Derbyshire Rugby Football Union
- Founded: 1956; 70 years ago
- Location: Wilford, Nottingham, Nottinghamshire, England
- Ground: Ferryfields
- Chairman: Richard Pascoe
- President: Dave Hassall
- Coach: Simon Pope
- League: Counties 1 Midlands East (North)
- 2024–25: 9th
Team kit

Official website
- www.nottinghammodernsrfc.com

Nottingham Moderns Rugby Football Club is an amateur Rugby Union team based in Wilford, a suburb of Nottingham, England. The 1st XV currently compete within the RFU English rugby union system and play in Counties 1 Midlands East (North) following their promotion from Midlands 4 East (North) as runner-up at the end of the 2023–24 season. The club play at their own Ferryfields ground on the banks of the River Trent, close to the Wilford Toll Bridge. The club has been in continuous existence since 1956, enjoying a nomadic existence before settling at their current home in 1975. In the 2010–11 season the club was awarded a prestigious President's XV award from the RFU, recognising the links the club has formed with the local universities. The club has also been awarded a further RFU President's XV award in the 2012–13 season, this time in the Community Engagement category.

== History ==
=== Inception: the 1950s and 1960s ===
In 1956 a group of 15-year-old school leavers from Players School and Cottesmore School had nowhere to play so they formed their own club. Nottingham Moderns RFC was formed. The early matches were played on rented pitches around the city. With the help of old school masters and the youth service, steady progress was made. However, financing the new club was a problem. On most occasions the players would make their way to away matches by public transport, resulting in all day adventures to various parts of the East Midlands.

A good relationship was formed with the local colleges and sports teachers, and with the Welsh Exiles. This led to a period of rapid growth that resulted in sustained fixtures with more established local sides and also games against the 2nd XV teams from the Midlands senior teams.

=== Settling down: the 1970s ===
The most successful season in the club's history was probably 1974–75, with the 1st XV, 2nd XV, and 3rd XV losing just three games each all season. The 1st XV and 2nd XV also won the respective County Cup competitions. All of this was accomplished as a nomadic club, with no fixed home, playing on rented parks pitches, and drinking in numerous local public houses to entertain their opposition. The year 1975 was momentous in the history of the club. The club finally secured a home at Wilford where they remain today. In the same year they became the first club from Nottinghamshire to win the Three Counties Cup (Nottinghamshire, Derbyshire & Lincolnshire). The 1st XV also reached the semi-final of the Midlands Clubs Championship.

In 1979 the clubhouse was built (extended in 1981), due in no small way to Arthur Luff, then Club President, and a former international referee.

During this successful period, the club produced a number of players who went on to represent many senior rugby clubs and representative sides. Brian Hall captained Leicester as well as representing the Barbarians and The Midlands. However, the greatest individual achievement from one of the Moderns' players of the time, did not come on the rugby pitch. In 1975, Doug Scott, a founder member of the club, stood alongside Dougal Haston on the summit of Mount Everest - the first Briton to reach the top of the world via the south-west face

=== The 1980s ===
Further County Cup triumphs followed in the 1980s. The hard work of the players was also rewarded with the inaugural Notts., Lincs., and Derbys. Divisional League Title, together with three Nottinghamshire Shield victories, and success in the final County Cup Final.

=== The 1990s ===
Even more success came in 1991. The 1st XV lifted the first Three Counties Cup, playing every round away from home and only conceding one try in the process. Not to be outdone, the 2nd XV went the whole season undefeated. At the same time, the club's under-14 side won the Three Counties Cup without conceding a try - a feat they repeated two years later as under-16s while winning the Rugby World Team of the Month award.

Hard work and determination from many members, most particularly David Hargreaves, resulted in increased sponsorship and finance. In 1996 the ground at Wilford was improved and the clubhouse extended. The opening ceremony was hosted by Dean Richards, the former Leicester Tigers Captain, who also brought a team of 'Old Tigers' (The Droglites) to play their first game outside of Leicestershire.

In 1996, the 1st XV won the League and Cup (The Stag & Swan Cup) double, the 2nd XV won the County Shield and the Veterans won the Skegness Trophy and Casuals Trophy.

In 1997, the 1st XV won the Cup (The Stag & Swan Cup) and reached the Three Counties Cup Final, the 2nd Xv retained the County Shield and the Veterans retained the Skegness Trophy.

=== The 2000s ===
In the 2004–05 seasons Moderns had a steady influx of ex-pat players from New Zealand who helped bolster the 1st XV and 2nd XV. Both teams performed well with regular wins. The 2007 season was the most successful recent event with the 1st XV winning both the County Cup and the Three Counties Shield.

In the 2010–11 season, the club continued to improve its position within Midlands 2 East (North), ending the season above its nearest rivals West Bridgford RFC for the third successive season.

The 2011–12 season saw the 1st XV struggle on the pitch leading to them finishing 12th in Midlands 2 East (North) and seeing them relegated to Midlands 3 East (North) for the 2012–13 season. The 2nd XV achieved a 2nd-place finish in their league which led to a promotion to the NLD Pennant 1 league.

The 2012–13 season saw the 1st XV compete well in the league achieving a mid-table position after a strong finish to the season. The 2nd XV competed well in the NLD Pennant league 1 but ultimately took the decision to drop back down to NLD Pennant league 2 for the following season.

The 2013–14 season saw a change in coach to Andrew Highton. The season was certainly a season of two halves as the 1st team struggled in the first part of the season but finished strongly to the season to achieve a mid-table finish again.

The 2014–15 season saw another new coach in Robert Fowkes take the helm. Yet again for the 1st XV it was a two part season as they struggled in the first part of the season but improved as the season went on to finish just above the relegation zone. The 2nd XV had a very successful season completing the league and cup double and only losing one competitive game all season.

The 2015–16 season saw the 1st XV struggle on the pitch due to the loss of some key figures from the previous season. This ultimately led to relegation finishing 11th in the league. There was some positive news on the pitch as all three senior teams reached their respective Notts RFU Cup finals. Victory was achieved by the 2nd XV retaining the cup from the previous season whilst the 1st XV & 3rd XV battled hard during their defeats.

== Teams at the club ==
As of the 2016–17 Season, Nottingham Moderns regularly field four senior teams:

- The 1st XV plays in the RFU league structure, currently in Midlands 3 East (North) following their promotion from Midlands 4 East (North) at the end of the 2016–17 season. This is the eighth tier of English rugby.
- The 2nd XV plays in the NLD Security Plus Pennant Leagues, which is mainly a league for 2nd, 3rd and 4th XVs of clubs within Nottinghamshire, Lincolnshire and Derbyshire. In the 2018–19 season they will compete in Pennant League 2.
- The 3rd XV is the club's social side, who also compete in the lower echelons of the NLD Security Plus Pennant League.
- The Veterans' XV comprises players aged 35 and over, and plays friendlies through the season.

The club has also been developing a Junior Rugby section and currently fields teams from under 7 to under 18 level, with the aim to eventually develop a full Junior/Mini rugby section which will feed into the senior teams. A number of players have come through the ranks to feature in the senior sides during the 2015–16 season for the first time.

== Club organisation ==
The club elects a committee of its members each year. For the 2023–24 season, the club's officers are:

- Club President: Dave Hassall
- Club Chair: Richard Pascoe
- Club Secretary: Ed Lisley
- Club Treasurer: Nick Mapley

Playing offices:

- Head Coach: Simon Pope
- Assistant Coach: Rob Freeston and Tim Baker
- 1st XV Captain: Miles Swann
- 1st XV Vice Captain: Sam Barre & Luke Allen
- 2nd XV Captain: Jack Lagdon
- 2nd XV Vice Captain: Jeremy Housden
- 3rd XV Captain: Cameron Docherty
- 3rd XV Vice Captain: Joshua Ralston

== Links with local universities ==
In the mid-2000s (decade) the club recognised that there was a need to re-establish former links with the local universities, the closest of which was Nottingham Trent University. The club lies midway between the University's City and Clifton campuses and will be a stop for the proposed Nottingham City Transport Tramline Extension which will link to two university campuses. The club set out a marketing strategy and embarked on a two-year plan which would hopefully benefit both the club and university. This last season has seen Nottingham Trent University and the University of Nottingham provide the club with a talented pool of players, with the club in return allowing use of its facilities and providing access to some expert coaching to the universities.

=== RFU recognition ===
In 2011, the club submitted for and won a prestigious RFU Presidents' XV award in the 'Student Rugby-Play On' category. The club's blueprint for forming links with students will be used as a case study by the RFU in a report it will send out to every registered rugby club in the country.

The club was again recognised by the RFU in the 2012–13 season, this time in the Community Engagement category.

Following on in 2025, the club participated in the Twickenham Takeover Day, an event celebrating clubs that excel in player retention and transition from youth to senior rugby. They were selected as the only Midlands team to participate out of 200 entries. The event, part of England Rugby's "Play Together, Stay Together" campaign, took place on Sunday, April 21st. Nottingham Moderns was recognized for its strong pathway structure for transitioning youth players to senior rugby.

== Notable players ==
- Doug Scott (England) : Scott's greatest achievements were in mountaineering rather than rugby, but he was a club member when he became the first British man to climb Mount Everest via the south-west face in 1975. He is also one of only seven living people to have been afforded the Freedom of the City of Nottingham.
- Brian Hall (England) : Hall played for the club during the 1970s before going to play for, and captain, Leicester Tigers. He also represented the Barbarians twice in 1981.
- Nick Carroll: Evergreen Fly Half Carroll also excelled at Touch Rugby, representing Wales in the 2011 Touch Rugby World Cup in Scotland.
- Bobby Sourbuts (England) : Still a player when commitments allow, Sourbutts is a physiotherapist who is currently serving as the Head Physiotherapist for Leicester Tigers Rugby club.

== Honours ==
- Notts, Lincs & Derbyshire 1 champions: 1987–88
- Midlands East 1 (Note: Not to be confused with Midlands 1 East.) champions: 1996–97
- Midlands 3 East (north v south) promotion play-off winners: 2001–02
