= Keyworth RFC =

English rugby union football club

(England) Keyworth
- Full name: Keyworth Rugby Union Football Club
- Union: Notts, Lincs & Derbyshire RFU
- Founded: 1976; 50 years ago
- Location: Widmerpool, Nottinghamshire, England
- Ground: Willoughby Road
- Chairman: Kevin Price
- President: Mike Waplington
- League: Counties 1 Midlands East (North)
- 2024–25: 1st (promoted from Counties 2 Midlands East (North) (champions))

Keyworth Rugby Union Football Club is an English rugby union club that plays in the Midlands Division, currently playing in Counties 1 Midlands East (North).

== Recent history ==
Keyworth RFC has recently upgraded the facilities on offer to players with the expansion of the club house and the recent installation of playing floodlights on pitch one and training floodlight on pitch two. In addition, in the past few seasons the squad has been exceptionally strengthened with the addition of quality young players, such as Adam Waldron and Nathan Hardy who are often stand out performers on matchdays.

== Coaching ==
The current Director of Rugby, in charge of the selection and training of all teams, is Cavan 'Towerblock' Keiran.
