= Birstall RFC =

(England) Birstall
- Full name: Birstall Rugby Football Club
- Union: Leicestershire RU
- Nickname: The Greendogs
- Founded: 1975
- Location: Birstall, Leicestershire, England
- Ground: Co-op Sports Ground Birstall
- Chairman: Adrian Knight
- Coach: Lewis Glover
- Captain: Ryan Brown
- League: Midlands Counties 1 East (North)
- 2022-23: 2nd Place (Midlands 3 East (South)), promoted to ([Midland Counties 1 East (North)])

Official website
- www.facebook.com/BirstallRugby/

Birstall Rugby Football Club is a men's senior rugby union club based in Birstall, Leicestershire. The club currently plays in the RFU Midlands leagues, currently participating in Midlands Counties 1 East (North) following promotion from Midlands 3 East (North) at the end of the 2021-22 season. Birstall won the RFU Junior Vase (midlands) competition in 2020 with the final being the last game before rugby was halted for the Covid-19 pandemic.

== History ==
Birstall Rugby Club was formed when teachers at a local senior school wanted to provide former pupils with a club in which they could continue playing rugby. A number of clubs were formed by ex-pupils of schools within Leicestershire immediately following the Second World War. Amongst these was Moat Road Old Boys who were founded in 1949. Following the loss of their use of their school playing fields in 1952, the club moved to Birstall village park and introduced the game to Birstall for the first time. The club were, by all accounts, regarded as enthusiastic & superbly fit and played all the top clubs in the county at the time. On one memorable occasion, they lost to Leicester Tigers by one point. Following the departure of a number of players to form a singing group called The Dallas Boys, the club failed to thrive and the club folded in 1956. Birstall had to wait for another 10 years to pass before the game returned with the formation of a new club in 1965. The club took the village name as Birstall RFC, played on the village park and changed in the scout hut. As the village of Birstall began to grow and new senior schools were established in the area, the rugby club went from strength to strength and was soon running two senior sides and a colts team. Despite considerable success, the club failed to recruit sufficient junior players and the club was forced to cease playing in 1973.

The current club was formed in 1975 by a group of teachers at the local senior schools with the intention of providing ex-pupils with a club that would enable them to continue playing the game. It was decided to affiliate the new club with Birstall Community College thus avoiding the "old boys" tag with all the limitations this brings. With the failure of local schools and colleges to provide any form of competitive sport, the supply of youth players joining the club began to dry up in the mid-eighties. With no youngsters available to take over from retiring players, the club shrank in size until, in the late nineties, it virtually ceased to exist. However, strenuous efforts made by a number of key individuals kept the club afloat and, by the end of the 1999/2000 season, Birstall RFC were proudly crowned champions of the Leicestershire Merit Table.

During the early part of the millennium Birstall started to feel the pinch like so many local sides. Raising enough players to field a side became extremely difficult and the club came close to folding in 2003. Thankfully, due to a lot of hard work by the committee and links once again being developed with Longslade Community college, the Green Dogs were once again going from strength to strength. With some strong recruitment and hard work the club showed a resurgence and by 2008 were able to field 2 sides with the first XV winning their first league in a decade.

The 2010s were a decade where the Greendogs made a move in community rugby. Having won several promotions in the Leicestershire Merit Leagues, Birstall made the move to the RFU regional competitions in 2014 beginning their new journey in Midlands leagues by winning Midlands 5 at the first attempt. This soon followed with promotion form Midlands 4 to 3 the following season. With the village of Birstall being right on the divide of what the RFC classes at Mids North or Mids South, Birstall moved from side to side in Midlands 3 North and Midlands 3 South, respectfully finishing 4th in the north in 2017-18.

The end of this season also saw the Greendogs move home. Having played at the local schools for the previous 40 years they moved to their new home at the Midlands Coop Sports Ground in the village, this facility with its brand new pitches were some of the best in Leicestershire and a great place for the club to base its future around. Back on the field the following year another sideways move put Birstall in the tougher Midlands 3 (south) where a final day defeat to high flying Stamford saw Birstall suffer their first relegation in a decade.

The 2019-20 season saw Birstall in Mids 4 (south.) With a strong side Birstall made inroads into not only winning the League but also challenged for cups too. In the Midlands Junior Vase, Birstall professed all the way to the final where a tight 13-12 win against Clee Hill from Shropshire made them Midlands Champions. This meant Birstall were now only one game away from the National final at Twickenham. This turned out to be the final action of the season as the Covid-19 Pandemic ended all rugby union in the UK with the season postponed. The leagues were decided later in the month as the RFU used calculations to figure out the final standings and Birstall were crowned Champions ahead of second place Northampton Mens Own.

With Rugby returning after the pandemic, Birstall found themselves promoted into Midlands 3 (North)for the 21/22 season, facing a number of sides for the first time. In a tough league including sides from Nottingham, Derby & Lincolnshire, Birstall played a free flowing brand of rugby eventually finishing second to champions Mellish resulting in promotion to Midlands 2 for the first time in their history.

In the same season Birstall found themselves in the LRU county bowl final for the third consecutive season and fourth time overall having previously lost to Leicester Forest (twice) and Ashby. On this occasion Birstall faced Melton RFC and on the fourth time of asking won the LRU county Bowl.

== Club Honours ==
- Leicestershire League Division 3 champions: 2008–09
- Leicestershire Merit League champions: 2009–10
- Leicestershire Presidents Spring Cup winners: 2012–13
- Midlands 5 East (North) champions: 2014–15
- Charnwood Sports Club of the Year 2016
- Midlands 4 East (South) Champions: 2019–20
- RFU Junior Vase (Midlands) Champions 2019–20
- LRU County Bowl Champions 2021-22
