= Dronfield Woodhouse =

District of Dronfield, Derbyshire, England

Coordinates: 53.304°N 1.503°W

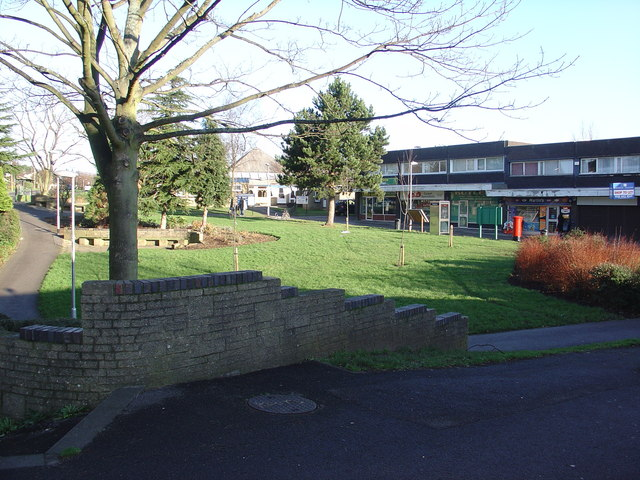
- Pentland Road shops, Gosforth Valley, Dronfield Woodhouse

- Location within Derbyshire
- OS grid reference: SK332786
- Civil parish: Dronfield
- District: North East Derbyshire
- Shire county: Derbyshire
- Region: East Midlands
- Country: England
- Sovereign state: United Kingdom
- Post town: DRONFIELD
- Postcode district: S18
- Dialling code: 01246
- Police: Derbyshire
- Fire: Derbyshire
- Ambulance: East Midlands
- UK Parliament: North East Derbyshire

Dronfield Woodhouse is a district of Dronfield, in the North East Derbyshire district, in the county of Derbyshire, England. The area has been inhabited since at least the 11th century (Cowley – pronounced Coaley – Farm, to the south) and its main road, Carr Lane, features a 13th-century house, formerly Hall Farm. The 19th-century former primary school on Holmesfield Road is now an elderly care home.

Coal mining was an important activity in the village in the 19th and early 20th centuries and the last pit to close was Hurst Hollow in 1947. The current public house, the Miners' Arms, stands opposite the entrance to one of the former mines. Along with mining went Methodism. The chapel, constructed in 1848, has recently been converted into a private dwelling following its closure. In the immediate post-war years, the village had its own post office and general store opposite Hall Farm, as well as two additional shops located in Carr Lane.

During the 1950s, the construction of council housing connected Dronfield Woodhouse to the nearby hamlet of Stubley, which had already become linked to Dronfield in the interwar period. In the 1960s, a major housing development in the adjacent Gosforth Valley transformed Dronfield Woodhouse into a quiet dormitory settlement for surrounding urban centres. Sheffield and Chesterfield. The surrounding countryside is still readily accessible, however, and the boundary of the Peak District National Park is less than 2 miles to the west.

On 31 December 1894 Dronfield Woodhouse became a separate civil parish, being formed from Dronfield, on 1 April 1935 the parish was abolished and merged with Dronfield. In 1931 the parish had a population of 976.
