= Rolls-Royce RFC =

Rolls Royce
- Full name: Rolls-Royce Rugby Football Club
- Union: Notts, Lincs & Derbyshire RFU
- Founded: 1943; 82 years ago
- Location: Derby, Derbyshire, England
- Ground(s): Moor Lane
- League(s): Midlands 3 East (North)
- 2019–20: 12th (relegated to Midlands 4 East (North))
Team kit

Official website
- www.pitchero.com/clubs/rolls-roycerfc/

Rolls-Royce Rugby Football Club is an English rugby union based in Derby. The first XV currently plays in Midlands 3 East (North).
