= Long Eaton RFC =

English rugby union club, based in Derbyshire

England
- Full name: Long Eaton Rugby Football Club
- Union: Notts, Lincs & Derbyshire RFU
- Nickname(s): LE
- Founded: 1969; 56 years ago
- Location: Long Eaton, Derbyshire
- Region: NLD
- Ground(s): West Park (Capacity: 1,000)
- Chairman: Chris Brookes
- CEO: Chris Brookes
- President: Duncan Gooch
- Director of Rugby: Murray McConnell
- Coach(es): Murray McConnell
- Captain(s): Jack Collister
- League(s): Regional 1 Midlands
- 2024–25: 8th
Team kit	Change kit

Long Eaton RFC is a rugby union club based in Long Eaton, Derbyshire, UK. They currently play in Regional 1 Midlands following their promotion from Regional 2 North Midlands in 2024. The club went on an impressive run of promotions having been the 2017–18 champions of RFU Midlands Division 3 East (North) and 2016–17 champions of RFU Midlands Division 4 East (North) having remained unbeaten in both seasons. They are also won 2016–17 RFU Midlands Junior Vase, narrowly missing out on the national final. The clubs current director of rugby and head coach is former Nottingham RFC player Murray McConnell

The club play their home games on West Park.

== History ==
The club was formed in 1969 by a group of local people, mainly businessman and school teachers. In the first season only 3 games were played before becoming full members of Derbyshire RFU in 1969. The club soon progressed to running two sides in 1971, and then by 1974 was running four senior sides.

In 1982 the club ran a colts section which lasted three years, and then returned to running four senior sides through until the late nineties when gradually over a number of years the club was resigned to running one side in 2008.. Along with the decrease in playing numbers the club in parallel lost its level of rugby resulting in them languishing in the bottom league of the Notts, Lincs and Derbyshire rugby hierarchy.

The club has always played its fixtures on West Park, Long Eaton, and from its early days using local pubs and Parkland's Adult Education Centre for a number of years, it is now based in its own leased Clubhouse on West Park. The club has two council owned pitches, one of which is fully floodlit.

The club has peaked and troughed like many local clubs. The two peaks arguably, the mid 70s before league rugby when Long Eaton were one of the top sides in Derbyshire and then mid to late 90s when rising up the leagues and getting to the semi-final of the Three Counties Cup.

== Present day ==
In 2015, The club agreed a change in constitution and structure, removing the committee and replacing it with a management team and creating posts and job descriptions more prevalent to modern rugby. The club now runs senior, ladies, colts, junior and mini teams and has the highest approval from the Rugby Football Union.

The club is based in West Park where it has been part of the Borough Councils changing room block, approx a third of the building, since 1995. Inside the leased premise, the club has a communal area with a licensed bar, a kitchen, a Sports Therapy and six self-contained changing rooms. There are two council owned pitches, one of which is floodlit to match standard, and the club own the floodlights. This pitch also has a crowd barrier down each side. The club has a very good relationship with the borough Council, who use the facilities on a regular basis.

The club has partnerships with Long Eaton, Wilsthorpe, Friesland and Chilwell Secondary Schools. The club also works with a number of primary schools with Long Eaton and surrounding areas.

In 2014, the chairman Chris Brookes received several awards. His year of awards started with LERFC Club Man of the Year, soon after he received a 'Service to Sport' award from Wilsthorpe School Long Eaton Closely followed by another 'Service to Sport' award presented by Erewash School Sports Association (ESSA). In July he received an invitation to meet the Prime Minister, David Cameron at a reception at No. 10 to celebrate the work he has done to support the Armed Forces Community through rugby.

In 2015–16 season, the adult playing membership was now just under 100 whilst our youth (Boys and Girls) and minis section stands at just over 200.

== Honours ==
- Notts, Lincs & Derbyshire 1 champions: 1995–96
- Midlands 5 East (North) champions: 2010–11
- Midlands 4 East (North) champions: 2016–17
- RFU Midlands Junior Vase winners: 2016–17
- Midlands 3 East (North) champions: 2017–18
- Midlands 2 East (North) champions: 2020-21
- Regional 2 North Midlands champions: 2023–24
