= Paviors RFC =

English rugby union club, based in Nottinghamshire

Paviors
- Full name: Paviors Rugby Football Club
- Union: Notts, Lincs & Derbyshire Rugby Football Union
- Founded: 1922; 104 years ago
- Location: Arnold, Nottinghamshire
- Ground: The Ron Rossin Ground
- League: Regional 2 North Midlands
- 2024–25: 8th

Official website
- www.paviorsrfc.co.uk

Paviors Rugby Club is an English rugby union club based in Arnold, Nottinghamshire. The first XV team currently play in Regional 2 North Midlands, following their relegation from at the end of season 2022–23. The club also operates a 2nd XV, Paviors Ladies, a colts team and junior sides.

== Honours ==
- Midlands 3 East (North) champions: 2004–05
- Midlands 1 (east v west) play-off winner: 2018–19
