= Nottinghamians =

Rugby union club in Holme Pierrepont, Nottinghamshire

(England) Nottinghamians
- Full name: Nottinghamians Rugby Football Club
- Union: Notts, Lincs & Derbyshire RFU
- Nickname: 'Hamians
- Founded: 1971; 55 years ago
- Location: Holme Pierrepont, Nottinghamshire, England
- Region: East Midlands
- Ground: Adbolton Lane
- League: Counties 3 Midlands East (North-West)
- 2025–26: 5th
Team kit

Nottinghamians RFC is a rugby union club that plays in Holme Pierrepont in Nottingham, England. The club started out as Old Nottinghamians, a club for former pupils of Nottingham High School. The club's ground, on Adbolton Lane next to the National Watersports Centre, is still owned by the Old Nottinghamians Sports Club. In the summer the ground is used by Nottingham Cricket Club. Since 1971, the club has been known simply as "Nottinghamians", and it is no longer a requirement that members should be old boys of the High School.

As of 2026, Nottinghamians RFC runs two men's open age sides. Owing to the connections with the High School it was never deemed appropriate for the club to run junior sides.

The first XV plays in the Midlands Division of the RFU league structure — as of the 2026/27 season in Midlands 3 East (North West), the ninth tier of English rugby. The second XV plays occasional friendly matches against local teams.

Currently, a number of Nottinghamians players also play for Nottingham Outlaws rugby league club. They also have a number of students from the University of Nottingham and Nottingham Trent University as well as some old boys from the High School.
