= West Bridgford RFC =

Rugby union team based in Nottinghamshire

West Bridgford
- Full name: West Bridgford Rugby Football Club
- Union: Notts, Lincs & Derbyshire RFU
- Founded: 1939; 87 years ago
- Location: West Bridgford, Nottinghamshire, England
- Region: Midlands
- Ground(s): The Memorial Ground, Stamford Road
- Chairman: Mr. Dilwyn Evans
- President: Mr David Ponting
- League: Regional 2 North Midlands
- 2024–25: 5th
Team kit

West Bridgford Rugby Football Club is a rugby union club in West Bridgford, Nottinghamshire whose first team play in the Regional 2 North Midlands following their relegation from Regional 1 North East at the end of 2022–23 season

== History ==
West Bridgford Rugby Football Club began life at its present home on Stamford Road, West Bridgford in 1945. The club stands in memory of those West Bridgfordiands that gave their lives in both World Wars and Stamford Road will forever be a memorial ground. Historically, West Bridgford RFC have run two or three senior sides with a veterans team playing most weeks. The rugby section actually forms one half of the West Bridgford Sports Club, with a thriving cricket section as a sister arm (West Bridgfordians Cricket Club).

== Current playing base ==
There are over 150 senior players registered to the club, with over 30 training twice weekly. The club also has a successful junior section of over 150 registered youngsters, ranging in age from 6 to 19. The top junior age category, The colts (aged 17–19) are current area champions at their age group and in the 2014–15 season won the NLD Championships to become East Midland Champions.

== The National Lottery ==
In 2004, West Bridgford RFC secured funding of £170,000 from the National Lottery Charitable Funds commission to enable the build of a state of the art changing facility. Other funding was provided by Rushcliffe Borough Council, WREN and The RFU amongst others. The club raised over £30,000 independently of these funds. This follows a £50,000 redevelopment of the first team pitch and plans for a £50,000 internal project to rejuvenate the bar facility. The clubhouse has now been fully renovated.

== Playing links ==
There is an exchange scheme from St Edmunds School in Canberra, Australia for a number of their students to travel over to Nottingham and play for the club for twelve months. There are also links with both South African and New Zealand rugby entities.

== Honours ==
- Midlands 2 East (North) champions: 2017–18
