= 1972 England rugby union tour of South Africa =

Rugby matches played by England

Summary
P	W	D	L
Total
7	6	1	0
Test match
1	1	0	0
Opponent
P	W	D	L
South Africa
1	1	0	0

This first tour undertaken by England to South Africa was organised with a demanding schedule, although with only one Test Match. Within two weeks and three days, seven matches were to be played, the first four at sea level, and the final three, including the Test Match, at the altitude in the highveld with only two days to acclimatise before a demanding fixture against Northern Transvaal. From the outset, under captain John Pullin and the management of Alec Lewis and John Elders, there was a buoyant and optimistic spirit in the squad, as if they were determined to erase the memories of the last few seasons of undistinguished English performances.

== Apartheid backdrop and controversy ==
The tour took place against the backdrop of widespread condemnation of the apartheid regime. Under pressure from other African nations, the International Olympic Committee had excluded South Africa from competing in the Summer Games since 1964, and there had also been protests against visiting sporting teams from South Africa.

In 1971, an international cricket boycott was instituted against South Africa to voice global disapproval of their selection policies and apartheid in general. South Africa subsequently became a world sporting pariah, and were excluded from the Olympics, the FIFA World Cup, test cricket, and a host of other sports.

There were protests against the 1972 England rugby tour, including a blockade of their hotel to try to prevent them leaving, in which 14 people were arrested.

== Matches ==
Scores and results list England's points tally first.

Opposing Team	For	Against	Date	Venue	Status
Natal	19	0	17 May 1972	Durban	Tour match
Western Province	9	6	20 May 1972	Cape Town	Tour match
SA Rugby Fed XV	11	6	22 May 1972	Cape Town	Tour match
SA Leopards	36	3	24 May 1972	Port Elizabeth	Tour match
Northern Transvaal	13	13	27 May 1972	Pretoria	Tour match
Giqualand West	60	21	30 May 1972	Kimberley	Tour match
South Africa	18	9	3 June 1972	Ellis Park, Johannesburg	Test Match

== Test Match ==
Piet Greyling led a combination of Springboks who seemed hopelessly unsure of themselves. Dawie Snyman collected all the South African points with three penalties while England, with unspectacular competence, grabbed every scoring chance. Fullback Sam Doble converted a try by wing Alan Morley and also booted four penalties.

3 June 1972

South Africa	9–18	England
Pen: Snyman 3		Try: Morley; Con: Doble; Pen: Doble 4

Ellis Park, Johannesburg
Referee: Justus Moolman (South Africa)

South Africa			England
Ray Carlson	FB	15	FB	Sam Doble
Syd Nomis	W	14	W	Alan Morley
Tonie Roux	C	13	C	Jeremy Janion
Joggie Jansen	C	12	C	Peter Preece
Gert Muller	W	11	W	Peter Knight
Dawie Snyman	FH	10	FH	Alan Old
Joggie Viljoen	SH	9	SH	Jan Webster
Albie Bates	N8	8	N8	Andy Ripley
Jan Ellis	F	7	F	John Watkins
(capt.) Piet Greyling	F	6	F	Tony Neary
John Williams	L	5	L	Chris Ralston
Piet du Plessis	L	4	L	Peter Larter
Sakkie Sauermann	P	3	P	Mike Burton
Piston van Wyk	H	2	H	John Pullin (capt.)
Niek Bezuidenhout	P	1	P	Stack Stevens
		Replacements
		Coaches
Johan Claassen (South Africa)				(England) John Elders

== Touring party ==
- Manager: Alec Lewis
- Assistant Manager: John Elders
- Captain: John Pullin (Bristol) 24 caps

=== Full Backs ===
- Sam Doble (Moseley) No caps
- David Whibley (Leicester) No caps

=== Three-Quarters ===
- Jeremy Janion (Bedford) 8 caps
- Peter Knight (Bristol) 2 caps
- Alan Morley (Bristol) No caps
- Peter Preece (Coventry) No caps
- Tony Richards (Fylde) No caps
- John Spencer (Headingley) 15 caps

=== Half-Backs ===
- Alan Old (Middlesbrough) 4 caps
- Tom Palmer (Gloucester) No caps
- Lionel Weston (West of Scotland) 2 caps
- Jan Webster (Moseley) 2 caps
- Steve Smith (Wilmslow) No caps (Replacement for L. E. Weston)

=== Forwards ===
- John Barton (Coventry) 4 caps
- Tony Boddy (Metropolitan Police) No caps
- Mike Burton (Gloucester) 4 caps
- Fran Cotton (Loughborough College) 3 caps
- Tim Cowell (Rugby) No caps
- Peter Larter (Northampton) 21 caps
- Tony Neary (Broughton Park) 4 caps
- John Pullin (Bristol) 24 caps
- Chris Ralston (Richmond) 6 caps
- Andy Ripley (Rosslyn Park) 4 caps
- Stack Stevens (Harlequins) 9 caps
- John Watkins (Gloucester) No caps
- Dave Watt (Bristol) 4 caps

== See also ==
- History of rugby union matches between England and South Africa
