= 1971 South Africa rugby union tour of Australia =

South African rugby team tour to Australia which sparked anit-apartheid protests

The 1971 South Africa rugby union tour of Australia was a controversial six-week rugby union tour by the Springboks to Australia. Anti-apartheid protests were held all around the country. The tour is perhaps most infamous for a state of emergency being declared in Queensland.
In total, around 700 people were arrested whilst the Springboks were on tour.

== Overview ==
The first games were then played in Adelaide and Perth, which were disrupted mainly by youth-led protesters. The third match was set to take place in Melbourne. A 5,000 strong crowd, made up mostly of university students, gathered in the streets of Melbourne to march on Olympic Park in protest. Police had set up a wall of units around the stadium, around 650 policemen many armed with batons and some on horseback.

In Sydney, several people, including the Secretary of the New South Wales Builders Labourers Federation, attempted to saw down the goal posts at the Sydney Cricket Ground prior to the match. In addition, a gigantic anti-apartheid effigy was hung from the Sydney Harbour Bridge but subsequently cut down.

Queensland premier Joh Bjelke-Petersen declared a month-long state of emergency. Protests at the Tower Mill Motel where the South African team were staying were responded to by police. The game was instead played at the Exhibition Ground, being moved from its original venue at Ballymore, as it was deemed easier to erect barricades at the Exhibition Ground. A two-metre chain wire fence was erected to separate players and spectators, backed up by police in full riot gear standing ten meters apart and facing the spectators.

According to Meredith Burgmann and Peter McGregor, both leading firebrands, the rugby tour was a crucial target but to stop the summer's cricketing visit was the ultimate goal. They were successful in this regard as the cricket tour was called off due to security reasons.

Seven players of the Australia national rugby union team – Jim Boyce, Tony Abrahams, Paul Darveniza, Terry Forman, Barry McDonald, James Roxburgh and Bruce Taafe – who had previously toured South Africa for three months in 1969 and seen the effects of the "ruthless" apartheid system "both in everyday life in South Africa and within the rugby stadiums themselves", declared "their opposition to the continuation of sporting ties with the South African Republic". Dubbed the "Rugby Seven" and the "Anti-Apartheid Seven", their non-violent action was an "unprecedented stance in refusing to play against the Springboks".

The anti-apartheid protests had influenced the cancellation of the South African cricket team tour in Australia in 1971–72.

== Fixtures ==
Scores and results list South Africa's points tally first.

Opposing Team	F	A	Date	Venue
Western Australia	44	18	26 June 1971	Perry Lakes Stadium, Perth
South Australia	43	0	30 June 1971	Norwood Oval, Adelaide
(Victoria (state)) Victoria	50	0	3 July 1971	Olympic Park Stadium, Melbourne
(New South Wales) Sydney	21	12	6 July 1971	SCG, Sydney
New South Wales	25	3	10 July 1971	SCG, Sydney
New South Wales Country	19	3	13 July 1971	Wade Park, Orange
Australia	19	11	17 July 1971	SCG, Sydney
Australian Capital Territory	34	3	21 July 1971	Manuka Oval, Canberra
Queensland	33	14	24 July 1971	Brisbane Exhibition Ground, Brisbane
(Australia) Junior Wallabies	31	12	27 July 1971	Brisbane Exhibition Ground, Brisbane
Australia	14	6	31 July 1971	Brisbane Exhibition Ground, Brisbane
Queensland Country	45	14	3 August 1971	Gold Park, Toowoomba
Australia	18	6	7 August 1971	SCG, Sydney

== Touring group ==
- Manager Flappie Lochner
- Coach Johan Claassen

Hookers

- Piston van Wyk
- Robbie Barnard

Props

- Hannes Marais (capt)
- Sakkie Sauermann
- Martiens Louw

Locks

- Frik du Preez
- John Williams
- Johan Spies

Loose forwards

- Tommy Bedford
- Morne du Plessis
- Jan Ellis
- Piet Greyling
- Thys Lourens
- Albie Bates as replacement

Fullbacks

- Ian McCallum
- Tonie Roux

Wings

- Syd Nomis
- Gert Muller
- Hannes Viljoen
- Andy van der Watt as replacement

Centres

- Peter Cronje
- Joggie Jansen
- Peter Swanson

Flyhalves

- Piet Visagie
- Dawie Snyman

Scrumhalves

- Joggie Viljoen
- Dirk de Vos

== Test matches ==
South Africa won the Test Series 3–0

- 17 July 1971 – Sydney Cricket Ground, Sydney, South Africa 19–11 Australia

South Africa: McCallum, Nomis, Cronje, Jansen, Viljoen, Visagie, J Viljoen, Du Plessis, Ellis, Greyling, Williams, Du Preez, Marais (c), Van Wyk and Sauermann

Tries by Hannes Viljoen, Joggie Viljoen and Jan Ellis. Ian McCallum 2 conversions and penalty and Piet Visagie drop goal.

Australia Captain Greg Davis

- 31 July 1971 – Brisbane Exhibition Ground, Brisbane, South Africa 14–6 Australia

First try: Piet Visagie

- 7 August 1971 – Sydney Cricket Ground, Sydney. South Africa 18–6 Australia

== See also ==
- 1981 South Africa rugby union tour of New Zealand
