= North Midlands 3 =

English rugby union league

- Current season or competition: 2003–04 North Midlands 3
- Sport: Rugby union
- Instituted: 1987; 39 years ago
- Ceased: 2004; 22 years ago
- Number of teams: 8
- Country: England
- Holders: Chaddesley Corbett (1st title) (2003–04) (promoted to North Midlands (South) 2)
- Most titles: Multiple teams (1 title)
- Website: North Midlands RFU

North Midlands 3 was a tier 11 English Rugby Union league with teams from Birmingham, Herefordshire, Shropshire and Worcestershire taking part. Promoted teams moved up to North Midlands (South) 2 and since the cancellation of North Midlands 4 at the end of the 1991–92 campaign there was no relegation. North Midlands 3 was cancelled at the end of the 2003–04 season with teams transferred into either North Midlands (South) 2 or North Midlands (North).

== Original teams ==
When league rugby began in 1987 this division contained the following teams:

- Birmingham City Officials (Note: Birmingham City Officials would later merge with Birmingham Welsh in 1997 to form Birmingham Exiles RFC.)
- Birmingham Welsh (Note: Birmingham Welsh would later merge with Birmingham City Official in 1997 to form Birmingham Exiles RFC.)
- Five Ways Old Edwardians
- Kynoch (Note: Kynoch RFC would later merge with Birchfield RUFC in 2003 to form Birmingham Barbarians RFC.)
- Ledbury
- Old Griffinians
- Old Moseleians (Note: Old Moseleians were disbanded in 1996.)
- Redditch
- Selly Oak (Note: Selly Oak would later be renamed as Moseley Oak - the amateur side of Birmingham Moseley.)
- Warley
- Yardley & District

== North Midlands 3 honours ==
=== North Midlands 3 (1987–1992) ===
The original North Midlands 3 was a tier 9 league involving clubs from Birmingham and the West Midlands (Note: The West Midlands included Herefordshire, Shropshire and Worcestershire along with the city of Birmingham. Clubs from Staffordshire and Warwickshire played in their own leagues.). Promotion was to North Midlands 2 and relegation to North Midlands 4.

North Midlands 3
Season	No of teams	Champions	Runners–up	Relegated teams	Reference
1987–88	11	Selly Oak	Five Ways Old Edwardians	Old Moseleians, Yardley & District	
1988–89	11	West Midlands Police	Veseyans	Ledbury, Kynoch	
1989–90	11	Old Griffinians	Redditch	Old Saltleians, Bournville	
1990–91	11	Warley	Ross-on-Wye	Bromyard, Birmingham Welsh, Birchfield	
1991–92	11	Five Ways Old Edwardians (Note: Restructuring of the Midlands leagues meant that champions Five Ways Old Edwardians were promoted two levels up into North Midlands 1.)	Old Centrals (Note: Restructuring meant that runners up Old Centrals were also promoted two levels up into North Midlands 1. The rest of the clubs in the division were promoted into North Midlands 2.)	No relegation (Note: The cancellation of North Midlands 4 at the end of the season, combined with all clubs being promoted from North Midlands 3, meant there was no relegation.)	
Green backgrounds are promotion places.

=== North Midlands 3 (1992–1993) ===
Restructuring of the Midlands leagues saw North Midlands 3 drop two levels to become a tier 11 league. Promotion continued to North Midlands 2 and since the cancellation of North Midlands 4 at the end of the 1991–92 season there would be no relegation.

North Midlands 3
Season	No of teams	Champions	Runners–up	Relegated teams	Reference
1992–93	12	Birmingham Welsh	Old Saltleians	No relegation	
Green backgrounds are the promotion places.

=== North Midlands 2 (1993–1996) ===
The top six teams from Midlands 1 and the top six from North 1 were combined to create National 5 North, meaning that North Midlands 3 dropped another level to become a tier 12 league. Promotion continued to North Midlands 2 and there was no relegation. At the end of the 1995–96 season North Midlands 3 was cancelled and all clubs transferred into North Midlands 2.

North Midlands 3
Season	No of teams	Champions	Runners–up	Relegated teams	Reference
1993–94	11	Upton-upon-Severn	Birmingham Civil Service	No relegation	
1994–95	11	Wulfrun	Stourport	No relegation	
1995–96	11	Ledbury	Cleobury Mortimer (Note: The cancellation of North Midlands 3 at the end of the season meant that all clubs were promoted into North Midlands 2.)	No relegation	
Green backgrounds are the promotion places.

=== North Midlands 3 (1999–2004) ===
North Midlands 3 was reintroduced after an absence of three seasons - this time as a level 11 league. Promotion was to North Midlands 2 and there was no relegation. At the end of the 2003–04 season the division was cancelled for good and all teams transferred into either North Midlands (South) 2 or North Midlands (North).

North Midlands 3
Season	No of teams	Champions	Runners–up	Relegated teams	Reference
1999–00	7	Clee Hill	Essington	No relegation	
2000–01	7	Solihull	Worcester Wanderers	No relegation	
2001–02	8	Bredon Star	Birchfield	No relegation	
2002–03	7	Stourbridge Lions	Dudley Wasps	No relegation	
2003–04	7	Chaddesley Corbett	Harborne (Note: The cancellation of North Midlands 3 meant that all seven clubs were promoted from the division. Six teams went up into North Midlands 2 (South), while the other (Greyhound) went into North Midlands (North).)	No relegation	
Green backgrounds are the promotion places.

== Number of league titles ==
- Birmingham Welsh (1)
- Bredon Star (1)
- Clee Hill (1)
- Five Ways Old Edwardians (1)
- Old Griffinians (1)
- Selly Oak (1)
- Solihull (1)
- Stourbridge Lions (1)
- Upton-upon-Severn (1)
- Warley (1)
- West Midlands Police (1)
- Wulfrun (1)

== See also ==
- North Midlands 1
- North Midlands 2
- North Midlands 4
- Midlands RFU
- North Midlands RFU
- English rugby union system
- Rugby union in England
