= North Midlands 1 =

English rugby union league

- Current season or competition: 2005–06 North Midlands (South) 1
- Sport: Rugby union
- Instituted: 1987; 39 years ago
- Ceased: 2006; 20 years ago
- Number of teams: 8
- Country: England
- Holders: Evesham (2nd title) (2005–06) (promoted to Midlands 4 West (South))
- Most titles: Evesham, Old Yardleians (2 titles)
- Website: North Midlands RFU

North Midlands (South) 1 (formerly North Midlands 1) was a tier 9 English Rugby Union league with teams from Birmingham, Herefordshire, Shropshire and Worcestershire taking part. Promoted teams moved up to Midlands 4 West (South) and relegated teams dropped to North Midlands (South) 2 (formerly North Midlands 2).

From its inception in 1987 through to 2004 the league had been known as North Midlands 1. Ahead of the 2004–05 season restructuring saw the league split into two regional divisions - North Midlands (North) and North Midlands (South) 1. The northern section was cancelled after just one season and the majority of teams transferred into the new Midlands 5 West (North). At the end of the 2005–06 season the southern section (and North Midlands leagues) were cancelled for good, and the teams transferred into a variety of divisions based on final table standings, including Midlands 5 (West North), Midlands 5 West (South), Midlands 6 West (North) and Midlands 6 West (South-West).

== Original teams ==
When league rugby began in 1987 this division contained the following teams:

- Bridgnorth
- Camp Hill
- Edwardians (Note: Old Boys side of King Edward's School, Birmingham.)
- Erdington
- Kidderminster Carolians
- Kings Norton
- Luctonians
- Newport (Salop)
- Old Halesonians (Note: Old Boys side of Halesowen Grammar School.)
- Old Yardleians
- Whitchurch

== North Midlands 1 honours ==
=== North Midlands 1 (1987–1992) ===
The original North Midlands 1 was a tier 7 league involving clubs from Birmingham and the West Midlands (Note: The West Midlands included Herefordshire, Shropshire and Worcestershire along with the city of Birmingham. Clubs from Staffordshire and Warwickshire played in their own leagues.). Promotion was to Midlands 2 West and relegation to North Midlands 2.

North Midlands 1
Season	No of teams	Champions	Runners–up	Relegated teams	Reference
1987–88	11	Old Yardleians	Whitchurch	Edwardians, Erdington	
1988–89	11	Camp Hill	Kings Norton	Malvern, Old Halesonians	
1989–90	11	Worcester	Whitchurch	Newport (Salop), Kidderminster Carolians	
1990–91	11	Whitchurch	Aston Old Edwardians	Bridgnorth, Evesham, Veseyans	
1991–92	11	Old Yardleians (Note: Restructuring of the Midlands leagues meant that champions Old Yardleians were promoted into the new Midlands West 1.)	Dudley Kingswinford (Note: Restructuring meant that ten clubs were promoted from North Midlands 1 at the end of the season; Dudley Kingswinford, Old Halesonians, Kings Norton and Ludlow would join champions Old Yardleians in Midlands West 1, while Dixonians, Woodrush, West Midlands Police, Shrewsbury and Aston Old Edwardians would go into the new Midlands West 2.)	No relegation (Note: Restructuring meant there was no relegation - most clubs were promoted with only bottom club Luctonians remaining in North Midlands 1 for the following season.)	
Green backgrounds are promotion places.

=== North Midlands 1 (1992–1993) ===
Restructuring of the Midlands leagues saw North Midlands 1 drop two levels to become a tier 9 league. Promotion was to the newly introduced Midlands West 2, while relegation continued to North Midlands 2.

North Midlands 1
Season	No of teams	Champions	Runners–up	Relegated teams	Reference
1992–93	13	Newport (Salop)	Five Ways Old Edwardians	Ross-on-Wye	
Green backgrounds are the promotion places.

=== North Midlands 1 (1993–1996) ===
The top six teams from Midlands 1 and the top six from North 1 were combined to create National 5 North, meaning that North Midlands 1 dropped another level to become a tier 10 league. Promotion continued to Midlands West 2 and relegation to North Midlands 2.

North Midlands 1
Season	No of teams	Champions	Runners–up	Relegated teams	Reference
1993–94	13	Luctonians	Telford Hornets	Redditch	
1994–95	13	Malvern	Telford Hornets	Droitwich	
1995–96	13	Evesham	Telford Hornets (Note: Due to the cancellation of National 5 North at the end of the season, seven clubs were promoted including Telford Hornets, Old Griffinians, Edwardians, Warley, Pershore and Erdington.)	No relegation (Note: Due to widespread restructuring caused by the cancellation of National 5 North there was no relegation.)	
Green backgrounds are the promotion places.

=== North Midlands 1 (1996–2000) ===
At the end of the 1995–96 season National 5 North was discontinued and North Midlands 1 returned to being a tier 9 league. Promotion continued to Midlands West 2 and relegation to North Midlands 2.

North Midlands 1
Season	No of teams	Champions	Runners–up	Relegated teams	Reference
1996–97	17	Birmingham City Officials (Note: Champions Birmingham City Officials would merge with Birmingham Welsh the following season to form Birmingham Exiles RFC, playing in Midlands West 2 under the new name.)	Kidderminster Carolians	Wulfrun	
1997–98	17	Kidderminster Carolians	Old Saltleians	Multiple teams (Note: Restructuring of the North Midlands for the following season meant that six clubs would be relegated including Kynoch, Birmingham Civil Service, Ross-on-Wye, Veseyans and Oswestry. The sixth relegated side, Old Centrals RFC, would merge with Witton RFC in 1998 to form Aldridge RFC playing in North Midlands 2.)	
1998–99	12	Bridgnorth	Droitwich	Multiple teams (Note: The reintroduction of North Midlands 3 for the following season and subsequent restructuring meant that four clubs were relegated including Birchfield, Tenbury, Bishop's Castle & Onny Valley and Yardley & District.)	
1999–00	10	Droitwich (Note: Champions Droitwich were promoted into the newly introduced Midlands 4 West (South).)	Redditch (Note: Redditch and 3rd place Cleobury Mortimer would also be promoted into the new Midlands 4 West (South).)	No relegation	
Green backgrounds are the promotion places.

=== North Midlands 1 (2000–2004) ===
Despite widespread Midlands league restructuring ahead of the 2000–01 season, North Midlands 1 remained at tier 9. Promotion was now to the newly introduced Midlands 4 West (South) while relegation continued to North Midlands 2.

North Midlands 1
Season	No of teams	Champions	Runners–up	Relegated teams	Reference
2000–01	8	Ledbury	Stourport	Old Griffinians	
2001–02	10	Edwardians	Yardley & District	Warley, Tenbury, Bishop's Castle & Onny Valley	
2002–03	10	Solihull	Worcester Wanderers	Five Ways Old Edwardians, Stourport	
2003–04	9	Veseyans	Bishop's Castle & Onny Valley	Bromyard	
Green backgrounds are the promotion places.

=== North Midlands (North / South) 1 (2004–2005) ===
Ahead of the 2004–05 campaign North Midlands 1 was divided into two regional tier 9 divisions: North Midlands (North) and North Midlands (South) 1. Promotion was to either Midlands 4 West (North) or Midlands 4 West (South), while relegation only applied to North Midlands (South) 1 with teams dropping to North Midlands (South) 2. North Midlands (North) was cancelled at the end of the campaign and the majority of teams transferred into the newly introduced Midlands 5 West (North).

North Midlands (North / South) 1
Season	No of teams	Champions	Runners–up	Relegated teams	League Name	Reference
2004–05	9	Harborne (Note: Champions Harborne were promoted into Midlands 4 West (North).)	Aldridge (Note: Runners up Aldridge were also promoted into Midlands 4 West (North).)	No relegation	North Midlands (North)	
2004–05	9	Stourbridge Lions	Cleobury Mortimer	Birmingham Exiles, Birmingham Civil Service	North Midlands (South) 1	
Green backgrounds are the promotion places.

=== North Midlands (South) 1 (2005–2006) ===
North Midlands (South) 1 continued as a solitary tier 9 league following the cancellation of North Midlands (North). Promotion was to Midlands 4 West (South) and relegation to North Midlands (South) 2. At the end of the 2005–06 season North Midlands (South) 1 was cancelled and the majority of teams transferred to the newly introduced Midlands 5 West (North) and Midlands 5 West (South) divisions.

North Midlands (South) 1
Season	No of teams	Champions	Runners–up	Relegated teams	Reference
2005–06	8	Evesham (Note: Champions Evesham were promoted into Midlands 4 West (South).)	Upton-on-Severn (Note: Due to the cancellation of the North Midlands leagues multiple teams were transferred to new divisions for the following season depending on league position. Upton-on-Severn (2nd), Woodrush (5th) and Bredon Star (6th) went into Midlands 5 West (South), Kings Norton (3rd) and Tenbury (4th) went into Midlands 5 West (North), Redditch (7th) went into Midlands 6 West (South-West) and Handsworth (8th) went into Midlands 6 West (North).)	No relegation (Note: Due to the cancellation of the North Midlands leagues there was no relegation.)	
Green backgrounds are the promotion places.

== Number of league titles ==
- Evesham (2) (Note: One of Evesham's titles was for the North Midlands (South) 1 regional division.)
- Old Yardleians (2)
- Birmingham City Officials (1)
- Bridgnorth (1)
- Camp Hill (1)
- Droitwich (1)
- Edwardians (1)
- Harborne (1) (Note: Harborne's title was for the North Midlands (North) regional division.)
- Kidderminster Carolians (1)
- Ledbury (1)
- Luctonians (1)
- Malvern (1)
- Newport (Salop) (1)
- Solihull (1)
- Stourbridge Lions (1) (Note: Stourbridge Lions title was for the North Midlands (South) 1 regional division.)
- Veseyans (1)
- Whitchurch (1)
- Worcester (1)

== See also ==
- North Midlands 2
- North Midlands 3
- North Midlands 4
- Midlands RFU
- North Midlands RFU
- English rugby union system
- Rugby union in England
