= List of Moseley R.F.C. seasons =

This is a list of seasons played by Moseley Rugby Football Club in English rugby from 1972, the year of the first formalised English rugby union club competition, to the most recent completed season.

== Seasons ==
Season	League									Anglo-Welsh Cup	National Trophy	B & I Cup	Top points scorer(s)		Top try scorer(s)	
Season	Division	P	W	D	L	F	A	Pts	Pos	Anglo-Welsh Cup	National Trophy	B & I Cup	Name	Points	Name	Tries
1971–72	There was no League rugby until 1988.									R/U			Sam Doble	581		
1972–73	There was no League rugby until 1988.									R2						
1973–74	There was no League rugby until 1988.									R2						
1974–75	There was no League rugby until 1988.									QF						
1975–76	There was no League rugby until 1988.									R2						
1976–77	There was no League rugby until 1988.									QF						
1977–78	There was no League rugby until 1988.									R2						
1978–79	There was no League rugby until 1988.									R/U						
1979–80	There was no League rugby until 1988.									R2						
1980–81	There was no League rugby until 1988.									SF						
1981–82	There was no League rugby until 1988.									Shared						
1982–83	There was no League rugby until 1988.									R3						
1983–84	There was no League rugby until 1988.									R4						
1984–85	There was no League rugby until 1988.									R4						
1985–86	There was no League rugby until 1988.									R4						
1986–87	There was no League rugby until 1988.									QF						
1987–88	Nat Div 1	11	5	0	6	167	170	26	7th	SF						
1988–89	Nat Div 1								10th	R3						
1989–90	Nat Div 1								11th	SF						
1990–91	Nat Div 1								12th	QF						
1991–92	Nat Div 2	12	6	0	6	215	196	12	7th	R2						
1992–93	Nat Div 2	12	6	2	4	184	150	14	6th	QF			Bob Massey	40	Nick Parry; Bob Massey	3
1993–94	Nat Div 2	18	8	1	9	253	209	17	5th	QF			Simon Hodgkinson	83	Mark Linett	5
1994–95	Nat Div 2	18	8	1	9	299	313	17	6th	R4			Simon Hodgkinson	156	Six players	2
1995–96	Nat Div 2	18	7	0	11	327	447	14	6th	R4			Alistair Kerr	172	Alistair Kerr	7
1996–97	Nat Div 2	22	9	0	11	492	741	18	8th	R5			Richard Le Bas	177	Darragh O'Mahony	15
1997–98	Prem 2	22	11	1	10	478	421	23	6th	R6			Matt Jones	178	Darragh O'Mahony	17
1998–99	Prem 2	26	10	0	16	498	633	20	10th	R4			Andy Binns	85	Marcus Cook	9
1999–00	Prem 2	26	14	0	12	595	524	28	7th	R4			Owen Doyle	116	Peter Buckton	11
2000–01	Nat Div 1	26	9	2	15	497	646	47	10th	R3			Ben Harvey	181	Andy Grey; Rod Martin	6
2001–02	Nat Div 1	26	9	1	16	448	695	45	11th	R4			Lee Hinton	126	Richard Protherough	7
2002–03	Nat Div 1	26	7	0	19	399	1178	23	13th	R3			Stephen Nutt	123	Geoff Gregory; James Hinkins	7
2003–04	Nat Div 2	26	11	2	13	535	524	24	10th	R2			Ollie Thomas	151	James Aston	18
2004–05	Nat Div 2	26	17	0	9	665	505	81	3rd	R4			Ollie Thomas	328	Nathan Bressington	16
2005–06	Nat Div 2	26	23	0	3	785	415	112	1st		R6		Ollie Thomas	273	Nathan Bressington	22
2006–07	Nat Div 1	30	7	0	23	525	943	37	14th		R4		Ollie Thomas	267	Nathan Bressington	8
2007–08	Nat Div 1	30	12	1	17	519	744	58	10th		R4		Matt Jones	75	Dan Norton	9
2008–09	Nat Div 1	30	13	0	17	814	782	73	8th		W		Richard Vasey	143	James Rodwell	18
2009–10	Cham	22	10	0	12	444	543	46	9th			Grp	Tristan Roberts	206	Nathan Bressington	8
2010–11	Cham	22	5	3	14	382	667	29	11th			QF				
2011–12	Cham	22	6	1	15	445	634	33	10th			Grp				
2012–13	Cham	22	6	1	15	377	542	33	10th			Grp				
2013–14	Cham	23	9	1	13	449	575	44	7th			Grp				
2014–15	Cham	22	5	1	16	441	637	31	11th			Grp				
2015–16	Cham											QF				

== Key ==
- P = Played
- W = Games won
- D = Games drawn
- L = Games lost
- F = Points for
- A = Points against
- Pts = Final League points
- Pos = Final League position
- Nat Div 1 = National Division 1
- Nat Div 2 = National Division 2
- Prem 2 = Premiership 2
- Cham = Championship
- Divisions in **bold** indicate a change in division.
- Grp = Group Stage
- R1 = Round 1
- R2 = Round 2
- R3 = Round 3
- R4 = Round 4
- R5 = Round 5
- QF = Quarter-finals
- SF = Semi-finals
- R/U = Runners-up
- W = Winners

Champions	Runners-up	Promoted	Relegated
