= North Midlands Vase =

- Sport: Rugby Union
- Instituted: 2005; 21 years ago
- Number of teams: 21
- Country: England
- Holders: Ross on Wye (4th title) (2017–18)
- Most titles: Ross on Wye (4 titles)
- Website: North Midlands RFU

The North Midlands Vase is an annual rugby union knock-out club competition organized by the North Midlands Rugby Football Union and was first contested during the 2005-06 season when Kings Norton became the first winners when they defeated Oswestry in the final at Stourton Park in Stourbridge. The vase is currently open for clubs ranked in tiers 9-10 of the English rugby union system that fall under the North Midlands RFU umbrella, including sides based in Birmingham and the West Midlands, Herefordshire, Shropshire and Worcestershire, although one club, Dudley Wasps plays in the Midlands Reserve League, and two others, Bredon Star and Ross Wye, are both based in Gloucestershire and play in Gloucester 1 and Gloucester 2 respectively (tiers 9-10). In 2014 the North Midlands RFU introduced a 'Plate' competition for sides eliminated in the early stages of the vase. It is one of three men's club competitions in the region along with the North Midlands Cup (for tier 5-6 sides) and the North Midlands Shield (for tier 7-8 sides).

The current format is as a knock-out cup with a preliminary round, first round, quarter-final, semi-final and final which is held at a neutral venue in May (currently Heathbrook, home of Dudley Kingswinford RFC) along with the cup and shield finals. Due to the disjointed numbers of teams several teams have played in the preliminary round. Teams that lose in either the preliminary or first round stage then contest the plate while winners go on to contest the cup proper.

== North Midlands Vase winners ==
North Midlands Vase Winners
Season	Vase Winner	Score	Vase Runners–up	Plate Winner (Note: Plate competition introduced for 2014-15 season for teams that were knocked out of the first round of the North Midlands Vase.)	Score	Plate Runners-up	Venue
2005-06	Kings Norton	15-10	Oswestry				Stourton Park, Stourbridge, West Midlands
2006-07	Kings Norton	10-10 (aet) (Note: After extra time and with the game still tied, Kings Norton were announced as winners by virtue of scoring more tries (2-1).)	Bournville				Stourton Park, Stourbridge, West Midlands
2007-08	Ross on Wye	26-13	Cleobury Mortimer				Stourton Park, Stourbridge, West Midlands
2008-09	Ross on Wye	12-6	Evesham				Stourton Park, Stourbridge, West Midlands
2009-10	Evesham	35-15	Yardley & District				Stourton Park, Stourbridge, West Midlands
2010-11	Dudley Wasps	27-18	Edwardian				Stourton Park, Stourbridge, West Midlands
2011-12	Edwardian	24-12	Market Drayton				Heathbrook, Kingswinford, West Midlands
2012-13	Old Yardleians	10-5	Ross on Wye				Heathbrook, Kingswinford, West Midlands
2013-14	Bredon Star	34-7	Woodrush				Heathbrook, Kingswinford, West Midlands
2014-15	Evesham	10-9	Cleobury Mortimer	Redditch	12-12 (Note: Redditch won by penalty kick decider.)	Church Stretton	Heathbrook, Kingswinford, West Midlands
2015-16	Bredon Star	36-7	Redditch	Church Streeton	41-26	Greyhound	Heathbrook, Kingswinford, West Midlands
2016-17	Ross on Wye	23-14	Bromyard	Aldridge RFC	13-11	Aston Old Edwardians	Heathbrook, Kingswinford, West Midlands
2017-18	Ross on Wye	41-12	Dudley Wasps	Yardley & District	28-11	Greyhound	Heathbrook, Kingswinford, West Midlands

== Number of wins ==
=== Vase ===
- Ross on Wye (4)
- Bredon Star (2)
- Evesham (2)
- Kings Norton (2)
- Dudley Wasps (1)
- Edwardian (1)
- Old Yardleians (1)

=== Plate ===
- Aldridge (1)
- Church Streeton (1)
- Redditch (1)
- Yardley & District (1)

== See also ==
- North Midlands RFU
- North Midlands Cup
- North Midlands Shield
- English rugby union system
- Rugby union in England
