= Martiens Louw =

South African rugby union footballer

- Born: Marthinus Johannes Louw; 20 April 1938 Germiston, Gauteng
- Died: 12 October 2013 (aged 75) Pretoria, Gauteng
- Height: 1.87 m (6 ft 2 in)
- Weight: 97.5 kg (215 lb)
- School: Vereeniging Gimnasium, Vereeniging

Rugby union career
Provincial / State sides
Years	Team	Apps	(Points)
1969–1974	Transvaal		
International career
Years	Team	Apps	(Points)
1971	South Africa	2	

Marthinus Johannes Louw (20 April 1938 – 12 October 2013) was a South African rugby union player, coach and administrator.

== Biography ==
Louw played for Transvaal in the South African provincial competitions.He was a member of the Transvaal side that shared the Currie Cup with Northern Transvaal in 1971.

Louw played two test matches for the Springboks, both during the 1971 tour of Australia. He played loose-head prop in the second and third tests, after is provincial teammate, Sakkie Sauermann played in the first test. He also played in seven tour matches.

After his playing career, Louw acted as a Transvaal selector and vice-chairman and selector of the Vaal Triangle Rugby Union when it became a separate Union in 1984. He also coached Vaal Triangle.

=== Test history ===
No.	Opponents	Results (SA 1st)	Position	Tries	Dates	Venue
1.	Australia	14–6	Loosehead prop		31 July 1971	Brisbane Exhibition Ground, Brisbane
2.	Australia	18–6	Loosehead prop		7 August 1971	Sydney Cricket Ground, Sydney

== See also ==
- List of South Africa national rugby union players – Springbok no. 454
