= North Midlands Shield =

- Sport: Rugby Union
- Instituted: 2001; 25 years ago
- Number of teams: 19
- Country: England
- Holders: Moseley Oak (1st title) (2021-22)
- Most titles: Bridgnorth, Kidderminster Carolians (3 titles)
- Website: North Midlands RFU

The North Midlands Shield is an annual rugby union knock-out cup club competition organized by the North Midlands Rugby Football Union and was first contested during the 2001–02 season with Ledbury being the first ever winners, defeating Old Saltleians in the final held at Finstall Park in Bromsgrove. It is currently open for clubs ranked in tier 7-8 of the English rugby union system that fall under the North Midlands RFU umbrella, including sides based in Birmingham and the West Midlands, Herefordshire, Shropshire and Worcestershire. A tier 9 side, Shropshire based Oswestry, who play in Cheshire (South), also take part. In 2014 the North Midlands RFU introduced a 'Plate' competition for sides eliminated in the early stages of the Shield. It is one of three men's club competitions in the region along with the North Midlands Cup (for tier 5-6 sides) and the North Midlands Vase (for tier 9-10 sides).

The current format is as a knock-out cup with a preliminary round, first round, quarter-final, semi-final and final which is held at a neutral venue in May (2021-22’s Final was held at Worcester RFC) along with the cup and vase finals. Due to the disjointed numbers of teams, teams that lose in either the preliminary or first round stage then contest the shield plate while winners go on to contest the shield.

== North Midlands Shield winners ==
North Midlands Shield Winners
| Season | Shield Winner | Score | Shield Runners–up | Plate Winner (Note: Plate competition introduced for 2014-15 season for teams that were knocked out of the first round of the North Midlands Shield.) | Score | Plate Runners–up | Venue |
| 2001-02 | Ledbury | 13-5 | Old Saltleians | | | | Finstall Park, Bromsgrove, Worcestershire |
| 2002-03 | Solihull | 13-7 (Note: North Midlands RFU website has Worcester Wanderers as the winners of the 2003 competition yet Worcester News state Solihull win. This is backed up in other online new sources so it must be a mistake by the North Midlands RFU.) | Old Yardleians | | | | Stourton Park, Stourbridge, West Midlands |
| 2003-04 | Old Yardleians | 27-8 | Aston Old Edwardians | | | | Heathbrook, Kingswinford, West Midlands |
| 2004-05 | Solihull | 48-28 | Old Dixonians | | | | Stourton Park, Stourbridge, West Midlands |
| 2005-06 | Kidderminster Carolians | 24-18 | Old Halesonians | | | | Stourton Park, Stourbridge, West Midlands |
| 2006-07 | Old Halesonians | 15-0 | Aston Old Edwardians | | | | Stourton Park, Stourbridge, West Midlands |
| 2007-08 | Camp Hill | | Bournville | | | | Stourton Park, Stourbridge, West Midlands |
| 2008-09 | Bournville | 34-17 | Aston Old Edwardians | | | | Stourton Park, Stourbridge, West Midlands |
| 2009-10 | Old Saltleians | | Droitwich | | | | Stourton Park, Stourbridge, West Midlands |
| 2010-11 | Droitwich | 29-13 | Aston Old Edwardians | | | | Stourton Park, Stourbridge, West Midlands |
| 2011-12 | Droitwich | 27-16 | Veseyans | | | | Heathbrook, Kingswinford, West Midlands |
| 2012-13 | Bridgnorth | 10-6 | Droitwich | | | | Heathbrook, Kingswinford, West Midlands |
| 2013-14 | Bridgnorth | 30-8 | Stourbridge Lions | | | | Heathbrook, Kingswinford, West Midlands |
| 2014-15 | Bridgnorth | 18-13 | Kidderminster Carolians | Old Saltleians | 29-15 | Woodrush | Heathbrook, Kingswinford, West Midlands |
| 2015-16 | Kidderminster Carolians | 32-15 | Old Saltleians | Old Yardleians | 27-20 | Droitwich | Heathbrook, Kingswinford, West Midlands |
| 2016-17 | Kidderminster Carolians | 23-16 | Veseyans | Old Saltleians | 26-19 | Harborne | Heathbrook, Kingswinford, West Midlands |
| 2017-18 | Malvern | 53-12 | Old Saltleians | Droitwich | 19-7 | Shrewsbury | Heathbrook, Kingswinford, West Midlands |
| 2021-22 | Moseley Oak | 19-17 | Evesham | Edwardians | 38-34 | Shrewsbury | Worcester RFC, Worcester, Worcestershire |

== Number of wins ==
=== Shield ===
- Kidderminster Carolians (3)
- Bridgnorth (3)
- Droitwich (2)
- Solihull (2)
- Bournville (1)
- Camp Hill (1)
- Ledbury (1)
- Malvern (1)
- Moseley Oak (1)
- Old Halesonians (1)
- Old Saltleians (1)
- Old Yardleians (1)

=== Plate ===
- Old Saltleians (2)
- Droitwich (1)
- Edwardians (1)
- Old Yardleians (1)

== See also ==
- North Midlands RFU
- North Midlands Cup
- North Midlands Vase
- English rugby union system
- Rugby union in England
