= 2013 County Championship Plate =

English rugby union event

- Countries: England
- Date: 4 May 2013 – 26 May 2013
- Champions: Northumberland (4th title)
- Runners-up: North Midlands
- Attendance: 1,271 (average 106 per match)
- Highest attendance: 360 East Midlands v Northumberland (4 May 2013)
- Lowest attendance: 140 Northumberland v Eastern Counties (18 May 2013)
- Top point scorer: (Ireland) Caolan Ryan (North Midlands) 30
- Top try scorer: (England) Brett Daynes (East Midlands) 4

The 2013 County Championship Plate, also known as Bill Beaumont Cup Division 2, was the 12th version of the annual English rugby union, County Championship organized by the RFU for the tier 2 English counties. Each county drew its players from rugby union clubs from the third tier and below of the English rugby union league system (typically National League 1, National League 2 South or National League 2 North). The counties were divided into two regional pools (north/south) with three teams in the north division and three in the south, with the winners of each pool meeting in the final held at Twickenham Stadium. New teams to the division included Northumberland (north)) and North Midlands (south) who were relegated from the 2012 Bill Beaumont Cup.

Both Northumberland and North Midlands would make an instant return to the 2014 Bill Beaumont Cup as they won their respective pools, with North Midlands having a more difficult time of it as they were run close by Somerset. In the final at Twickenham, Northumberland proved to be a class apart, scoring six tries as they beat North Midlands 45–10 to claim their 4th title in the plate competition.

== Competition format ==
The competition format involved six teams divided into two regional group stages of three teams each, divided into north and south, with each team playing each other once. The top side in each group went through to the final held at Twickenham Stadium on 26 May 2013.

== Participating Counties and ground locations ==
Locations of the 2013 County Championship Plate county teams

County	Stadium(s)	Capacity	City/Area
Devon	Coronation Road	750	Tiverton, Devon
East Midlands	Greens Norton Road	N/A	Towcester, Northamptonshire
Eastern Counties	Grantchester Road	2,200 (200 seats)	Cambridge, Cambridgeshire
North Midlands	Stourton Park	3,500 (499 seats)	Stourbridge, West Midlands
Northumberland	Greensfield	1,200 (200 in stand)	Alnwick, Northumberland
Somerset	Bath Road	5,000	Bridgwater, Somerset

== Group stage ==
=== Division 1 North ===
2013 Beaumont Cup Division 1 North Table
	County	Played	Won	Drawn	Lost	Points For	Points Against	Points Difference	Try Bonus	Losing Bonus	Points
1	Northumberland (P)	2	2	0	0	68	20	48	2	0	10
2	East Midlands	2	1	0	1	37	51	-14	0	0	4
3	Eastern Counties	2	0	0	2	23	57	-34	0	1	1
If teams are level at any stage, tiebreakers are applied in the following order: 1. Number of matches won 2. Difference between points for and against 3. Total number of points for 4. Aggregate number of points scored in matches between tied teams 5. Number of matches won excluding the first match, then the second and so on until the tie is settled
Green background means the county qualified for the final and is also promoted to the Division 1 North of the Bill Beaumont Cup for the following season. Updated: 18 May 2013; Source: "County Championships". englandrugby.com.

==== Round 1 ====
4 May 2013
15:00

East Midlands	14 - 34	Northumberland (BP)
	Report

Greens Norton Road, Towcester
Attendance: 360
Referee: Andrew Rawson

==== Round 2 ====
11 May 2013
15:00

(BP) Eastern Counties	17 - 23	East Midlands

Grantchester Road, Cambridge
Attendance: 194
Referee: Alexis Manley

==== Round 3 ====
18 May 2013
14:00

(BP) Northumberland	34 - 6	Eastern Counties

Greensfield, Alnwick
Attendance: 140
Referee: Wayne Falla

=== Division 2 South ===
2013 Beaumont Cup Division 1 South Table
	County	Played	Won	Drawn	Lost	Points For	Points Against	Points Difference	Try Bonus	Losing Bonus	Points
1	North Midlands (P)	2	2	0	0	90	70	20	2	0	10
2	Somerset	2	1	0	1	66	51	15	2	1	7
3	Devon	2	0	0	2	45	80	-35	1	0	1
If teams are level at any stage, tiebreakers are applied in the following order: 1. Number of matches won 2. Difference between points for and against 3. Total number of points for 4. Aggregate number of points scored in matches between tied teams 5. Number of matches won excluding the first match, then the second and so on until the tie is settled
Green background means the county qualified for the final and is also promoted to the Division 1 South of the Bill Beaumont Cup for the following season. Updated: 18 May 2013; Source: "County Championships". englandrugby.com.

==== Round 1 ====
4 May 2013

(BP) North Midlands	50 - 34	Devon (BP)
	Report

Stourton Park, Stourbridge
Attendance: 143
Referee: Daniel Parott

==== Round 2 ====
11 May 2013

Devon	11 - 30	Somerset (BP)

Coronation Park, Tiverton
Attendance: 204
Referee: Phil Watters

==== Round 3 ====
18 May 2013

(2BP) Somerset	36 - 40	North Midlands (BP)
	Report

Bath Road, Bridgwater
Attendance: 230
Referee: Tom Davis

== Final ==
26 May 2013
9:30

Northumberland	45 - 10	North Midlands
	Report

Twickenham Stadium, London
Referee: Craig Maxwell-Keys

== Total season attendances ==
- Does not include final at Twickenham which is a neutral venue and involves teams from all three county divisions on the same day

County	Home Games	Total	Average	Highest	Lowest	% Capacity
Devon	1	204	204	204	204	29%
East Midlands	1	360	360	360	360	
Eastern Counties	1	194	194	194	194	9%
North Midlands	1	143	143	143	143	4%
Northumberland	1	140	140	140	140	12%
Somerset	1	230	230	230	230	5%

== Individual statistics ==
- Note if players are tied on tries or points the player with the lowest number of appearances will come first. Also note that points scorers includes tries as well as conversions, penalties and drop goals. Appearance figures also include coming on as substitutes (unused substitutes not included). Statistics will also include final.

=== Top points scorers ===
Rank	Player	County	Club Side	Appearances	Points
1	(Ireland) Caolan Ryan	North Midlands	Stourbridge	3	30
2	(England) Grant Connon	Northumberland	Darlington Mowden Park	2	22
3	(England) Brett Daynes	East Midlands	Coventry	2	20
4	(England) Drew Cheshire	North Midlands	Stourbridge	3	20
4	(England) Jason Smithson	Northumberland	Blaydon	3	20

=== Top try scorers ===
Rank	Player	County	Club Side	Appearances	Tries
1	(England) Brett Daynes	East Midlands	Coventry	2	4
2	(England) Drew Cheshire	North Midlands	Stourbridge	3	4
2	(England) Jason Smithson	Northumberland	Blaydon	3	4
3	(England) Tom Grimes	Northumberland	Preston Grasshoppers	2	3
3	(England) Ali Taylor	Somerset	Wellington	2	3

== See also ==
- English rugby union system
- Rugby union in England
