= Drew Cheshire =

English rugby union player

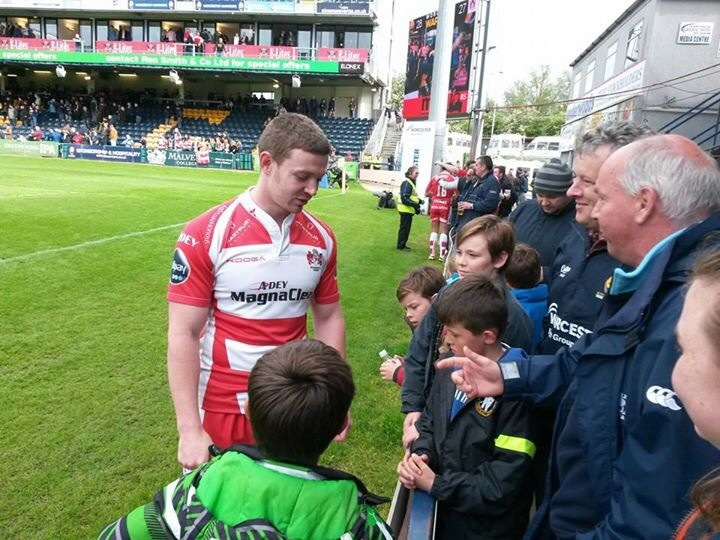
- Cheshire in 2014
- Born: 6 September 1991 (age 35) Hereford, Herefordshire, England
- School: Whitecross Highschool

Rugby union career
- Position: Wing
- Current team: Moseley
Youth career
- Luctonaians RFC
Senior career
Years	Team	Apps	(Points)
2009–13	Luctonians	69	(230)
2013-14	Gloucester Rugby	2	(0)
2014-	Moseley	21	(25)

Drew Cheshire (born 6 September 1991) is an English professional rugby union player who plays for Moseley. A product of Gloucester academy. He signed his first professional contract with Moseley who compete in the RFU Championship. Prior to joining Moseley, Drew spent a number of seasons with Luctonians experiencing first team rugby in both National League 3 Midlands and National League 2 North.

== Honours ==
North Midlands

- County Championship Plate runners up: 2013
