= Charles Fagan =

Charles Fagan may refer to:

- Charles Fagan (Alabama politician), Alabama state legislator
- Charles Fagan (Irish politician) (1881–1974), Irish National Centre Party/Fine Gael/Independent politician
- Charles Fagan (water polo) (1899–1977), Irish water polo player and olympian
