= Droitwich RFC =

English rugby union club, based in the Worcestershire

Droitwich
- Full name: Droitwich Rugby Football Club
- Union: North Midlands RFU
- Nickname: The Monners
- Founded: 1972; 53 years ago
- Location: Droitwich Spa, Worcestershire
- Ground: Glyn Mitchell Memorial Ground (Capacity: 3,000)
- Coach: John Critchlow
- League: Counties 1 Midlands West (South)
- 2024–25: 9th

Official website
- www.droitwichrfc.co.uk

Droitwich Rugby Football Club is an English rugby union team based in Droitwich Spa, Worcestershire. The club runs three senior sides and a veterans team, colts and a full set of mini (ages 6–11) and junior (ages 13–17) sides. The first XV currently play in Counties 1 Midlands West (South), following their relegation from Midlands 1 West at the end of the 2022–23 season.

== History ==
Droitwich Rugby Football Club was formed in 1972. The club's first games were played at St. Peter's Field, before moving to the nearby village of Hanbury on the outskirts of Droitwich Spa, where home games took place on land behind the Vernon Arms pub. A change in the pub ownership facilitated another move, this time back to Droitwich Spa, to the King George V playing fields. In 1984, after a number of years ground-hopping, the club official opened its first proper home at Hanbury Road. The 1986–87 season saw league rugby union introduced in England with Droitwich placed in the Midlands regional leagues. That year Droitwich came close to their first taste of major silverware when they reached the final of the North Midlands Cup, losing to Old Dixonians at The Reddings. In 1990 the club introduced its junior and mini section and this would grow steadily over the coming decade.

The town of Droitwich Spa also grew over the 1990s and this saw developers start to eye the surrounding land for potential development. This development included the ground at Hanbury Road and by 1998 the club decided to sell it for £1.9 million. With the club's future looking bright thanks to this money, Droitwich moved to their current home – the Glyn Mitchell Memorial Ground (named after one of the club's founders) – which was just up the road from their previous ground. Not long after the move, the club won North Midlands 1 at the end of the 1999–00 season and promotion to Midlands 4 West (South).

== Honours ==
- North Midlands 2 champions: 1992–93
- North Midlands 1 champions: 1999–00
- Midlands 3 West (South) champions (2): 2006–07, 2016–17
- North Midlands Shield winners (2): 2010–11, 2011–12
- North Midlands Intermediate Cup winners: 2018
- North Midlands Shield plate winners: 2017–18
