= Gert Muller =

Gert Muller may refer to:

- Gert Muller (rugby union, born 1986), South African rugby union player
- Gert Muller (rugby union, born 1948), South African rugby union player
