= Joggie Viljoen =

Joggie Viljoen may refer to:

- Joggie Viljoen (rugby union, born 1945), South African national rugby union player
- Joggie Viljoen (rugby union, born 1976), South African rugby union player
