= Robbie Barnard =

South African rugby union player

- Full name: Robert William Barnard
- Born: 26 November 1941 Pretoria, South Africa
- Died: 19 October 2013 (aged 71)
- Height: 1.83 m (6 ft 0 in)
- Weight: 91.6 kg (202 lb)

Rugby union career
- Position: Hooker
Provincial / State sides
Years	Team	Apps	(Points)
1964–72	Transvaal		
International career
Years	Team	Apps	(Points)
1970	South Africa	1	(0)

Robert William Barnard (26 November 1941 – 19 October 2013) was a South African international rugby union player.

Barnard was born in Pretoria and attended Hoërskool Fakkel.

An aggressive hooker, Barnard was associated with the Diggers club and gained his only official Springboks cap at Newlands in 1970, as a replacement for Piston van Wyk in the second of four home Test matches against the All Blacks. He was a member of the Springboks squad on their 1971 tour of Australia. A regularly Transvaal representative, Barnard's provincial appearances included in their drawn Currie Cup final against Northern Transvaal in 1971.

Barnard was the elder brother of Springboks fly–half Jannie Barnard.

== See also ==
- List of South Africa national rugby union players
