= North Midlands 2 =

English rugby union league

- Current season or competition: 2005–06 North Midlands (South) 2
- Sport: Rugby union
- Instituted: 1987; 39 years ago
- Ceased: 2006; 20 years ago
- Number of teams: 8
- Country: England
- Holders: Stourport (2nd title) (2005–06) (promoted to Midlands 5 West (North) (Note: The cancellation of the North Midlands league meant that champions Stourport were promoted into Midlands 5 West (North) instead of North Midlands (South) 1.))
- Most titles: Stourport (2 titles)
- Website: North Midlands RFU

North Midlands (South) 2 (formerly North Midlands 2) was a tier 10 English Rugby Union league with teams from Birmingham, Herefordshire, Shropshire and Worcestershire taking part. Promoted teams moved up to North Midlands 1 and since the cancellation of North Midlands 3 at the end of the 2003–04 season there was no relegation. North Midlands (South) 2 was itself cancelled at the end of the 2005–06 campaign and the majority of teams transferred to the newly introduced Midlands 6 West (South-West).

== Original teams ==
When league rugby began in 1987 this division contained the following teams:

- Aston Old Edwardians
- Bournville
- Droitwich
- Ludlow
- Malvern
- Old Centrals (Note: Old Centrals RFC would later merge with Witton RFC in 1998 to form Aldridge RFC.)
- Old Saltleians
- Pershore
- Shrewsbury
- Telford Hornets
- Woodrush

== North Midlands 2 honours ==
=== North Midlands 2 (1987–1992) ===
The original North Midlands 1 was a tier 8 league involving clubs from Birmingham and the West Midlands (Note: The West Midlands included Herefordshire, Shropshire and Worcestershire along with the city of Birmingham. Clubs from Staffordshire and Warwickshire played in their own leagues.). Promotion was to North Midlands 1 and relegation to North Midlands 3.

North Midlands 2
Season	No of teams	Champions	Runners–up	Relegated teams	Reference
1987–88	11	Shrewsbury	Malvern	Old Centrals, Old Saltleians	
1988–89	11	Aston Old Edwardians	Ludlow	Edwardians, Bournville	
1989–90	11	Veseyans	Woodrush	Five Ways Old Edwardians, Malvern	
1990–91	11	Old Halesonians	West Midlands Police	Droitwich, Erdington, Kidderminster Carolians	
1991–92	11	Selly Oak (Note: Restructuring of the Midlands leagues meant that champions Selly Oak were promoted two levels up into the new Midlands West 2.)	Old Griffinians (Note: Restructuring of the Midlands leagues meant that 10 clubs were promoted into North Midlands 1 for the following season, including Old Old Griffinians, Warley, Telford Hornets, Evesham, Newport (Salop), Pershore, Ross-on-Wye, Veseyans, Redditch and Bridgnorth.)	No relegation (Note: As all teams were promoted from the division there was no relegation.)	
Green backgrounds are promotion places.

=== North Midlands 2 (1992–1993) ===
Restructuring of the Midlands leagues saw North Midlands 2 drop two levels to become a tier 10 league. Promotion continued to North Midlands 1 and relegation to North Midlands 3.

North Midlands 2
Season	No of teams	Champions	Runners–up	Relegated teams	Reference
1992–93	13	Droitwich	Kidderminster Carolians	Birchfield	
Green backgrounds are the promotion places.

=== North Midlands 2 (1993–1996) ===
The top six teams from Midlands 1 and the top six from North 1 were combined to create National 5 North, meaning that North Midlands 2 dropped another level to become a tier 11 league. Promotion continued to North Midlands 1 and relegation to North Midlands 3.

North Midlands 2
Season	No of teams	Champions	Runners–up	Relegated teams	Reference
1993–94	13	Edwardians	Malvern	Old Moseleians	
1994–95	13	Erdington	Bromyard	Market Drayton	
1995–96	13	Birmingham City Officials	Old Saltleians (Note: Due to the cancellation of National 5 North at the end of the season, all eleven clubs were promoted into North Midlands 1, including Kynoch, Droitwich, Redditch, Upton-on-Severn, Ross-on-Wye, Birmingham Civil Service, Wulfrun, Tenbury and Birmingham Welsh.)	No relegation (Note: As all clubs were promoted into there was no relegation.)	
Green backgrounds are the promotion places.

=== North Midlands 2 (1996–2000) ===
At the end of the 1995–96 season National 5 North was discontinued and North Midlands 2 returned to being a tier 10 league. Promotion continued to North Midlands 1 and the cancellation of North Midlands 3 meant that there was no relegation until this division was re-introduced ahead of the 1999–00 campaign.

North Midlands 2
Season	No of teams	Champions	Runners–up	Relegated teams	Reference
1996–97	12	Ledbury	Bishop's Castle & Onny Valley	No relegation	
1997–98	10	Yardley & District	Birchfield	No relegation	
1998–99	13	Veseyans	Cleobury Mortimer	Multiple teams (Note: The reintroduction of North Midlands 3 meant that five clubs were relegated including Oswestry, Wulfrun, Bredon Star, Clee Hill and Kynoch.)	
1999–00	10	Stourport	Bishop's Castle & Onny Valley	No relegation	
Green backgrounds are the promotion places.

=== North Midlands 2 (2000–2004) ===
Despite widespread Midlands league restructuring ahead of the 2000–01 season, North Midlands 2 remained at tier 10. Promotion continued to North Midlands 1 and relegation to North Midlands 3.

North Midlands 2
Season	No of teams	Champions	Runners–up	Relegated teams	Reference
2000–01	9	Tenbury	Yardley & District	Birchfield	
2001–02	9	Solihull	Worcester Wanderers	Bournville, Harborne	
2002–03	9	Old Griffinians	Bishop's Castle & Onny Valley	Warley, Birchfield	
2003–04	9	Stourbridge Lions	Birmingham Civil Service	No relegation	
Green backgrounds are the promotion places.

=== North Midlands (South) 2 (2004–2006) ===
Restructuring for the 2004–05 season saw North Midlands 2 renamed as North Midlands (South) 2, remaining as a tier 10 division. Promotion was to North Midlands (South) 1 (Note: fFor the 2004–05 North Midlands 1 was divided into two regional divisions - North Midlands (North) and North Midlands (South) 1.) and the cancellation of North Midlands 3 meant there was no longer relegation. At the end of the 2005–06 the division was cancelled and the majority of teams transferred into the new Midlands 6 West (South-West).

North Midlands (South) 2
Season	No of teams	Champions	Runners–up	Relegated teams	Reference
2004–05	9	Bredon Star	Tenbury	No relegation	
2005–06	8	Stourport (Note: Champions Stourport were promoted into Midlands 5 West (North).)	Chaddesley Corbett RFC (Note: All non promoted clubs aside for Greyhound, who dropped out of the league system, were transferred into the new Midlands 6 West (South-West) division at the end of the season.)	No relegation	
Green backgrounds are the promotion places.

== Number of league titles ==
- Stourport (2)
- Aston Old Edwardians (1)
- Birmingham City Officials (1)
- Bredon Star (1)
- Droitwich (1)
- Edwardians (1)
- Erdington (1)
- Ledbury (1)
- Old Griffinians (1)
- Old Halesonians (1)
- Selly Oak (1)
- Shrewsbury (1)
- Solihull (1)
- Tenbury (1)
- Veseyans (1)
- Yardley & District (1)

== See also ==
- North Midlands 1
- North Midlands 3
- North Midlands 4
- Midlands RFU
- North Midlands RFU
- English rugby union system
- Rugby union in England
