= North Midlands 4 =

English rugby union league

- Current season or competition: 1991–92 North Midlands 4
- Sport: Rugby union
- Instituted: 1987; 39 years ago
- Ceased: 1992; 34 years ago
- Number of teams: 14
- Country: England
- Holders: Bournville (1st title) (1991–92) (promoted to North Midlands 2 (Note: Midlands league restructuring meant that Bournville were promoted two levels up into North Midlands 2 instead of North Midlands 3.))
- Most titles: Multiple teams (1 title)
- Website: North Midlands RFU

North Midlands 4 was a tier 10 English Rugby Union league with teams from Birmingham, Herefordshire, Shropshire and Worcestershire taking part. Promoted teams moved up to North Midlands 3 and there was no relegation. After five seasons North Midlands 4 was cancelled at the end of the 1991–92 campaign with teams transferred into either North Midlands 2 or North Midlands 3 depending on final league ranking.

== Original teams ==
When league rugby began in 1987 this division contained the following teams:

- Bewdley (Note: Bewdley would later merge with Stourport RFC in 2004 to form part of that clubs 3rd XV.)
- Birchfield (Note: Birchfield RUFC would later merge with Kynoch RFC in 2003 to form Birmingham Barbarians RFC.)
- Birmingham Civil Service
- Bromyard
- Ross-on-Wye
- Tenbury
- Upton-upon-Severn
- Veseyans
- West Midlands Police
- Witton (Note: Old Centrals RFC would later merge with Witton RFC in 1998 to form Aldridge RFC.)

== North Midlands 4 honours ==
North Midlands 4
Season	No of teams	Champions	Runners–up	Relegated teams	Reference
1987–88	10	West Midlands Police	Veseyans	No relegation	
1988–89	13	Tenbury	Birchfield	No relegation	
1989–90	13	Ross-on-Wye	Bromyard	No relegation	
1990–91	13	Old Moseleians	Kynoch	No relegation	
1991–92	14	Bournville (Note: Restructuring of the Midlands leagues meant that champions Bournville were promoted two levels up into North Midlands 2.)	Birchfield (Note: Restructuring meant that the top four clubs were promoted two levels up into North Midlands 2 including Market Drayton and Bromyard. The rest of the teams in the division were promoted into North Midlands 3.)	No relegation	
Green backgrounds are promotion places.

== Number of league titles ==
- Bournville (1)
- Old Moseleians (1)
- Ross-on-Wye (1)
- Tenbury (1)
- West Midlands Police (1)

== See also ==
- North Midlands 1
- North Midlands 2
- North Midlands 3
- Midlands RFU
- North Midlands RFU
- English rugby union system
- Rugby union in England
