= Piet du Plessis =

South African rugby union footballer (1947–2026)

- Born: Pieter George du Plessis; 23 July 1947 Nylstroom, Transvaal, Union of South Africa
- Died: 12 August 2026 (aged 79) South Africa
- Height: 1.98 m (6 ft 6 in)
- Weight: 108 kg (238 lb)
- School: Hoërskool Wonderboom, Pretoria
- University: University of Pretoria; Stellenbosch University

Rugby union career
Amateur team(s)
Years	Team	Apps	(Points)
- Tukkies
- Maties
Provincial / State sides
Years	Team	Apps	(Points)
19?–1972	Northern Transvaal		
1973–1978	Western Province		
International career
Years	Team	Apps	(Points)
1972	South Africa	1	

Pieter George du Plessis (23 July 1947 – 12 August 2026) was a South African rugby union player.

== Playing career ==
Du Plessis studied at the University of Pretoria and Stellenbosch University and became a Professor of Business Management. He played provincial rugby for Northern Transvaal and Western Province.

He played one test for the Springboks, the 1972 test match against the touring England team at Ellis Park in Johannesburg.

=== Test history ===
No.	Opponents	Results (RSA 1st)	Position	Tries	Dates	Venue
1.	England	9–18	Lock		3 June 1972	Ellis Park, Johannesburg

== Death ==
Du Plessis died from complications of dementia and Alzheimer's disease on 12 August 2026, at the age of 79.

== See also ==
- List of South Africa national rugby union players – Springbok no. 458
