= Hannes Viljoen =

South African rugby union footballer (1943–2021)

- Born: Johannes Theodorus Viljoen; 21 April 1943 Elliot, Eastern Cape
- Died: 13 January 2021 (aged 77)
- Height: 1.86 m (6 ft 1 in)
- Weight: 82 kg (181 lb)
- School: Tweespruit High School, Tweespruit, Free State

Rugby union career
Provincial / State sides
Years	Team	Apps	(Points)
1965–1972	Natal	63	
International career
Years	Team	Apps	(Points)
1971	South Africa		(6 [2T])

Johannes Theodorus Viljoen (21 April 1943 – 13 January 2021) was a South African rugby union player.

== Playing career ==
Viljoen represented Natal in the South African provincial competitions and made his debut for the union in 1965. With his retirement from rugby, he scored 43 tries for Natal, which was then the Natal record. He made his test debut for the Springboks during the 1971 tour of Australia on 17 July 1971 at the Sydney Cricket Ground. Viljoen scored his first test try in his first test and his second try in the second test. He played in all three test matches during the tour and in seven of the tour matches, scoring fourteen tries in the tour matches.

=== Test history ===
No.	Opponents	Results (SA 1st)	Position	Tries	Dates	Venue
1.	Australia	19–11	Wing	1	17 July 1971	Sydney Cricket Ground, Sydney
2.	Australia	14–6	Wing	1	31 July 1971	Brisbane Exhibition Ground, Brisbane
3.	Australia	18–6	Wing		7 August 1971	Sydney Cricket Ground, Sydney

== See also ==
- List of South Africa national rugby union players – Springbok no. 451
