= Johan Spies =

South African rugby union footballer

- Born: Johannes Jacobus Spies; 8 May 1945 (age 81) Harrismith, Free State
- Height: 1.95 m (6 ft 5 in)
- Weight: 111 kg (245 lb)
- School: Grey College, Bloemfontein
- University: University of Pretoria

Rugby union career
Provincial / State sides
Years	Team	Apps	(Points)
- Northern Transvaal
International career
Years	Team	Apps	(Points)
1970–1971	South Africa	4	

Johannes Jacobus 'Johan' Spies (born 8 May 1945) is a former South African rugby union player.

== Playing career ==
Spies played provincial rugby in South Africa for Northern Transvaal. He made his test debut for the Springboks in 1970 against the touring New Zealand team on 25 July 1970 at Loftus Versfeld in Pretoria. He played in all four test matches against the All Blacks. He toured with the Springboks to Australia during 1971 and played seven tour matches.

=== Test history ===
No.	Opponents	Results (SA 1st)	Position	Tries	Dates	Venue
1.	New Zealand	17–6	Lock		25 Jul 1970	Loftus Versfeld, Pretoria
2.	New Zealand	8–9	Lock		8 Aug 1970	Newlands, Cape Town
3.	New Zealand	14–3	Lock		29 Aug 1970	Boet Erasmus Stadium, Port Elizabeth
4.	New Zealand	20–17	Lock		12 Sep 1970	Ellis Park, Johannesburg

== See also ==
- List of South Africa national rugby union players – Springbok no. 446
