= Cecil Fagan =

Cecil Fagan may refer to:

- Cecil Fagan (water polo)
- Cecil Fagan (rugby union)
