= Alec Lewis =

England international rugby union player

- Full name: Alec Ormonde Lewis
- Born: 20 August 1920 Brighton, England
- Died: 12 January 2013 (aged 92) Grahamstown, South Africa
- School: Royal Masonic School, Brighton

Rugby union career
- Position: Wing-forward
International career
Years	Team	Apps	(Points)
1952–54	England	10	(0)

Alec Ormonde Lewis (20 August 1920 – 12 January 2013) was an English international rugby union player.

Lewis was born in Brighton, Sussex. His father worked with the East Indian Railway Company and was killed in a tiger attack. He was educated at Brighton's Royal Masonic School and played his early rugby with Old Masonians. In World War II, Lewis was badly injured by an anti-personnel mine while serving with the Eighth Army in the Mediterranean. He played football after the war with Swindon Town colts, before returning to rugby.

A wing-forward, Lewis played most of his rugby at Bath, which he joined from Wells RFC in the 1948–49 season. He became club captain in 1950-51 and also led Somerset in some of his 24 county appearances. From 1952 to 1954, Lewis won 10 England caps, aged 31 on his debut against the Springboks at Twickenham. He played all four matches in England's championship-winning 1953 Five Nations campaign.

Lewis had six years as a national selector and was manager of England's 1972 tour of South Africa, which is where he later settled. He also served as president of both Bath and Somerset.

== See also ==
- List of England national rugby union players
