= Jannie Barnard =

South African rugby union player

- Full name: Johannes Hendrikus Barnard
- Born: 29 January 1945 Johannesburg, South Africa
- Died: 21 February 1985 (aged 40) near Potchefstroom, South Africa
- Height: 1.70 m (5 ft 7 in)
- Weight: 73 kg (161 lb)

Rugby union career
- Position: Fly–half
Provincial / State sides
Years	Team	Apps	(Points)
- Transvaal
International career
Years	Team	Apps	(Points)
1965	South Africa	5	(0)

Johannes Hendrikus Barnard (29 January 1945 – 21 February 1985), known as Jannie Barnard, was a South African international rugby union player of the 1960s.

Barnard, the younger brother of Springboks hooker Robbie, was educated at Hoërskool Fakkel.

A lightly built fly–half, Barnard represented Transvaal and was capped five times for the Springboks in 1965. He made his debut against Scotland during a short tour of the British Isles, impressing enough to earn a place on their much longer tour of Australia and New Zealand which followed. After playing both Test matches in Australia, Barnard was displaced for the All Blacks series by Keith Oxlee, who possessed a better kicking game. He however returned to play the final two of four Test matches played between the sides.

Barnard died in a car accident in 1985.

== See also ==
- List of South Africa national rugby union players
