= Ray Carlson =

South African rugby union footballer

- Born: Raymond Allen Carlson; 2 October 1948 (age 78) East London, Eastern Cape
- Height: 1.92 m (6 ft 4 in)
- Weight: 81 kg (179 lb)
- School: Selborne College, East London
- University: Rhodes University; Stellenbosch University

Rugby union career
- Position: Fullback
Provincial / State sides
Years	Team	Apps	(Points)
1968–1969	Eastern Province		
1970	Border		
1972	Western Province		
1975–1976	Natal		
- North Eastern Cape
International career
Years	Team	Apps	(Points)
1972	South Africa	1	

Raymond Allen Carlson (born 2 October 1948) is a former South African rugby union player.

== Playing career ==
Carlson grew up in East London, the son of Ken Carlson, who refereed the Durban test between the Springboks and Lions in 1962. After school he played provincial rugby for Eastern Province, Border, Western Province, Natal and North Eastern Cape. In 1972 Carlson toured with the Gazelles, a South African under-24 team, to Argentina.

Carlson played only one test for the Springboks, the first test against the 1972 touring England team at Ellis Park in Johannesburg.

=== Test history ===
No.	Opponents	Results (RSA 1st)	Position	Points	Dates	Venue
1.	England	9–18	Fullback		3 June 1972	Ellis Park, Johannesburg

== See also ==
- List of South Africa national rugby union players – Springbok no. 456
