= Peter Knight (rugby union) =

England international rugby union player

- Full name: Peter Michael Knight
- Born: 7 October 1947 Bristol, England
- Died: 4 October 2015 (aged 67)

Rugby union career
- Position: Fullback / Winger
International career
Years	Team	Apps	(Points)
1972	England	3	(0)

Peter Michael Knight (7 October 1947 - 4 October 2015) was an English rugby union international.

Knight was raised in Bristol and attended Bristol Cathedral School.

Capped three times by England, Knight was called up to play fullback in the 1972 Five Nations, with the team looking for a successor to Bob Hiller. He featured in two of the matches and later took part in the mid-year tour of South Africa, where he played as a winger in the win over the Springboks at Ellis Park.

Knight, who became a priest, played for Bristol and Gloucestershire.

== See also ==
- List of England national rugby union players
