= Joggie Viljoen (rugby union, born 1945) =

South African rugby union footballer (1945–2023)

- Born: Joachim Frederick Viljoen; 14 May 1945 Cape Town, Cape Province, South Africa
- Died: 7 August 2023 (aged 78) South Africa
- Height: 1.74 m (5 ft 9 in)
- Weight: 66 kg (146 lb)
- School: Vanrhynsdorp High School, Vanrhynsdorp

Rugby union career
- Position: Scrumhalf
Provincial / State sides
Years	Team	Apps	(Points)
- Griqualand West
- Eastern Province
International career
Years	Team	Apps	(Points)
1971–1972	South Africa	6	(6)

Joachim Frederick 'Joggie' Viljoen (14 May 1945 – 7 August 2023) was a South African rugby union player.

== Playing career ==
Viljoen played provincial rugby in South Africa for Griqualand West and Eastern Province. He played six test matches for the Springboks and made his debut against the touring French team on 12 June 1971 at the Free State Stadium in Bloemfontein. He also played in all three test matches against Australia during the South African tour of Australia in 1971. His last test was against England at Ellis Park in 1972. Viljoen scored two tries in his six test matches and another two tries in four tour matches.

== Death ==
Joggie Viljoen died on 12 August 2023, at the age of 78.

== See also ==
- List of South Africa national rugby union players – Springbok no. 448
