= Tonie Roux =

South African rugby union footballer

- Born: Ockert Antonie Roux; 22 February 1947 (age 79) Pretoria, Gauteng
- Height: 1.86 m (6 ft 1 in)
- Weight: 77 kg (170 lb)
- School: Afrikaanse Hoër Seunskool, Pretoria
- University: University of Pretoria

Rugby union career
Amateur team(s)
Years	Team	Apps	(Points)
1968–1975	Tukkies		
Provincial / State sides
Years	Team	Apps	(Points)
1968–1975	Northern Transvaal	41	(76)
International career
Years	Team	Apps	(Points)
1969–1974	South Africa	7	

Ockert Antonie Roux (born 22 February 1947) is a former South African rugby union player.

== Playing career ==
Roux represented Northern Transvaal schools in 1964 and played his senior provincial rugby in South Africa for Northern Transvaal.

He made his test debut for the Springboks during the South African tour of Britain and Ireland in 1969 and 1970. His first test match was against Scotland at Murrayfield in Edinburgh, playing at centre. He played ss a centre in all three other tests on the tour and also against England in 1972. He was then selected at fullback for two tests against the British Lions in 1974. Roux was an unused bench replacement a further 13 times in test matches and played in twenty-four tour matches, scoring fifteen points for the Springboks.

=== Test history ===
No.	Opponents	Results (SA 1st)	Position	Tries	Dates	Venue
1.	Scotland	3–6	Centre		6 December 1969	Murrayfield, Edinburgh
2.	England	8–11	Centre		20 December 1969	Twickenham, London
3.	Ireland	8–8	Centre		10 January 1970	Lansdowne Road, Dublin
4.	Wales	6–6	Centre		24 January 1970	National Stadium, Cardiff
5.	England	9–18	Centre		3 June 1972	Ellis Park, Johannesburg
6.	British Lions	9–26	Fullback		8 June 1974	Boet Erasmus Stadium, Port Elizabeth
7.	(British & Irish Lions) British Lions	13–13	Fullback		27 July 1974	Ellis Park, Johannesburg

== See also ==
- List of South Africa national rugby union players – Springbok no. 426
