= Darragh O'Mahony =

Irish rugby union player

- Born: Darragh William O'Mahony; 18 August 1972 (age 54) Cork, Ireland
- Height: 1.80 m (5 ft 11 in)
- Weight: 83 kg (13.1 st; 183 lb)

Rugby union career
- Position: Wing
Amateur team(s)
Years	Team	Apps	(Points)
- Moseley
–	Bedford Blues		
–	Saracens		
International career
Years	Team	Apps	(Points)
1995–1998	Ireland	4	(5)

Darragh O'Mahony (born 18 August 1972) is an Irish former rugby union player who played on the wing for Moseley, Bedford Blues, Saracens and Ireland.
