= Cecil Fagan (rugby union) =

Irish rugby union player

- Full name: William Barnard Cecil Fagan
- Born: 23 April 1927 Dublin, Ireland
- School: Blackrock College
- University: Trinity College Dublin
- Occupation: Anaesthetist

Rugby union career
- Position: Prop
International career
Years	Team	Apps	(Points)
1956	Ireland	3	(0)

William Barnard Cecil Fagan (born 23 April 1927) is an Irish former international rugby union player.

== Biography ==
Born in Dublin, Fagan was educated at Blackrock College and suffered from rheumatic fever as a child, which kept him from playing sport for a number of years. He studied medicine at Trinity College Dublin.

Fagan, a strong scrummaging prop forward, represented Leinster and North Midlands. His Ireland call up came via Birmingham club Moseley, as he was based at Queen Elizabeth Hospital Birmingham. He gained three Ireland caps during the 1956 Five Nations, debuting against France at Colombes.

== See also ==
- List of Ireland national rugby union players
