= John Watkins (rugby union) =

England international rugby union player

- Full name: John Arthur Watkins
- Born: 28 November 1945 (age 80) Gloucester, England
- School: Linden Secondary School, Gloucester

Rugby union career
- Position: Flanker
Senior career
Years	Team	Apps	(Points)
1969-1982	Gloucester RFC	389	(430)
International career
Years	Team	Apps	(Points)
1972–75	England	7	(0)

John Arthur Watkins (born 28 November 1945) is an English former rugby union international.

Watkins was born in Gloucester and attended Linden Secondary Modern School.

A flanker, Watkins was capped seven times for England in the early 1970s, which included overseas wins against the Springboks and All Blacks, the former playing as a makeshift tighthead prop.

Watkins won three county championships with Gloucestershire and made 389 senior appearances for Gloucester RFC, captaining the club to the 1977–78 John Player Cup title.

In 2023, to celebrate the 150th anniversary of Gloucester Rugby, John Watkins was inducted into the Gloucester Rugby Hall of Fame.

== See also ==
- List of England national rugby union players
