= Kings Norton RFC =

English rugby union club, based in Hopwood, Worcestershire

(England) Kings Norton
- Full name: Kings Norton Rugby Football Club
- Union: North Midlands RFU
- Founded: 1923; 103 years ago
- Location: Hopwood, Worcestershire, England
- Region: Midlands
- Ground: Hopwood Park
- Chairman: Richard Brookes
- President: Chloe Gilmore
- Coach: Jamie Heafield
- Captain: Callum Meredith
- League: Midlands 3 West (South)
- 2025–26: 1st

Official website
- www.pitchero.com/clubs/kingsnorton/

Kings Norton RFC is an English rugby union team.

Established in 1923 in Kings Norton, Birmingham, the club soon moved its base into the Bromsgrove Urban District Council's area of Worcestershire, when it used a ground initially in Masshouse Lane, and later in Bells Lane on Bournville Village Trust land, where it had two pitches laid out.

The team won the inaugural North Midlands RFU Seven-a-Side Tournament in 1930, and a unique double was achieved when its Colts side won a similar inaugural competition at The Reddings in its 1963/4 season.

The club has hosted numerous county matches, and its players have appeared in representative sides over the years. Nigel Horton began his career at Kings Norton and went on to represent England. Nick Baxter has represented The Barbarians, England Students, England Sevens, Worcester Warriors, Pertemps Bees, and Stourbridge.

County boundary changes and housing development forced the club to move away from Bells Lane in 1973, and members worked hard to raise sufficient funds to purchase 12½ acres of agricultural land. A two-storey clubhouse and three rugby pitches were laid out.

Having weathered the initial difficulties, the new 2001/2 committee put together a three-year action plan designed to ensure survival and put the foundations for progress in place. Many of the goals it set for itself were achieved well ahead of schedule, and a revised plan had to be swiftly prepared. A ground-leveling scheme involving landfill was completed in 2003; this will eventually provide an extra small pitch ideal for youth rugby.

Kings Norton RFC play an active and important part in the local community, running 3 Senior Men's teams including a Veterans, they also have a thriving junior section which offers rugby for as young as Under-6 through to Under-16's. There is also a growing Girls rugby division within the club. They also have strong links to local schools and colleges, providing sponsorship and coaching to teams from as many as 9 schools, whilst holding annual and monthly tag-tournaments for all ages.

Players of all ages and abilities are welcome to KNRFC. Senior training is Tuesday and Thursday, 7:30 pm start. Juniors of all ages is Sunday, 10:15 am

== Club honors ==
- North Midlands Vase winners (2): 2005–06, 2006-07

== See also ==
- Kings Norton RFC website
