= Sam Doble =

England international rugby union player

Samuel Arthur Doble (9 March 1944 – 17 September 1977) was an English rugby union full-back who played international rugby for England and club rugby for Moseley. He was a Birmingham PE teacher, teaching at Northfield Comprehensive School. Doble was awarded three caps to play for England. He, however, suffered a sudden death in 1977 from cancer at the age of 33.

== Rugby career ==
Doble first came to public attention when he scored 581 points for Moseley in the 1971/72 domestic season. His debut was an 18–9 victory over South Africa in Johannesburg, in which he scored 14 points. England were on the back foot early on when they lost prop Stack Stevens to injury and had to contest seven-man scrums for twenty minutes. However, the visiting side's makeshift front row did not lose one strike against the head and England gradually took control of the game when Stevens returned. With the forwards keeping the Springboks at bay, Doble scored four penalties and converted Alan Morley's second half try from the touchline to help England to a most unlikely victory.

Despite his heroics in South Africa, Sam played in just two more matches, a 9–0 loss to New Zealand early in 1973 and a 25–9 loss to Wales in the following Five Nations campaign. England were outscored by five tries to nil, but Doble signed off his international account with two penalties to augment a drop goal by Dick Cowman.

== Death ==
In 1977, Sam died after being diagnosed with melanoma a few years before. His life was honoured with a special match between the Rugby Writers International XV and Moseley later in the year. Thirty years on, the victorious England side of Ellis Park '72 met up at Twickenham to watch Clive Woodward's England beat South Africa 53–3. Doble was the only player missing from the line-up.

== Memorial match ==
Moseley v International Rugby Writers XV Sunday 27 November 1977

Moseley 19 points International Rugby Writers XV 43 points

Moseley

15 C A Meanwell; 14 A Thomas, 13 M K Swain, 12 B J Corless, 11 P Beddoes; 10 M J Cooper, 9 C J Gifford; 1 T F Corless, 2 G N J Cox, 3 W H Greaves, 4 R Field, 5 B Ayre, 6 J C White, 8 N C Jeavons, 7 D G Warren

Scorers
Tries: P Beddoes, B J Corless, C A Meanwell
Conversions: M Cooper (2)
Penalties: C A Meanwell

International Rugby Writers XV

15 J P R Williams (Bridgend/Wales); 14 P J Squires (Harrogate/England), 13 S P Fenwick (Bridgend/Wales), 12 T G R Davies (Cardiff/Wales), 11 A R Irvine (Heriot's FP/Scotland); 10 P Bennett (Llanelli/Wales), 9 G O Edwards (Cardiff/Wales); 1 F E Cotton (Sale/England), 2 P J Wheeler (Leicester/England), 3 G Price (Pontypool/Wales), 4 W B Beaumont (Fylde/England), 5 A J Martin (Aberavon/Wales), 6 T J Cobner (Pontypool/Wales), 8 D L Quinnell (Llanelli/Wales), 7 A Neary (Broughton Park/England)

Replacements J Webster (Moseley/England), A Ripley (Rosslyn Park/England), A G Faulkner (Pontypool/Wales), R W Windsor (Pontypool/Wales), A Old (Sheffield/England)

Scorers
Tries: T G R Davies, T J Cobner, A R Irvine, A Neary, P J Squires (2), P Bennett (2)
Conversions: P Bennett (4)
Penalties: P Bennett (1)

Touch Judges: G Bannister, D Jones

Referee: N R Samson.
