= Sakkie Sauermann =

South African rugby union footballer

- Born: Johannes Theodorus Sauermann; 16 November 1944 Alberton, Gauteng
- Died: 13 June 2014 (aged 69) Nelspruit, Mpumalanga
- Height: 1.83 m (6 ft 0 in)
- Weight: 102 kg (225 lb)
- School: Amsterdamse Hoër Landbouskool

Rugby union career
Provincial / State sides
Years	Team	Apps	(Points)
1968–1974	Transvaal		
International career
Years	Team	Apps	(Points)
1971–1974	South Africa	5	

Johannes Theodorus 'Sakkie' Sauermann (16 November 1944 – 13 June 2014) was a South African rugby union player.

== Biography ==
Sauermann played for Transvaal in the South African provincial competitions and was a member of the Transvaal side that defeated Eastern Transvaal to win the 1972 Currie Cup. The previous year he scored the equalizing try, enabling Transvaal to share the 1971 title with Northern Transvaal.

Sauermann played five test matches and six tour matches for the Springboks. His debut was in 1972 against France. He played two test matches against France and one each against, Australia, England and the British Lions.

=== Test history ===
No.	Opponents	Results (SA 1st)	Position	Tries	Dates	Venue
1.	France	22–9	Loosehead prop		12 June 1971	Free State Stadium, Bloemfontein
2.	France	8–8	Loosehead prop		19 June 1971	Kings Park, Durban
3.	Australia	19–11	Loosehead prop		17 July 1971	Sydney Cricket Ground, Sydney
4.	England	9–18	Tighthead prop		3 June 1972	Ellis Park, Johannesburg
5.	British Lions	3–12	Loosehead prop		8 June 1974	Newlands, Cape Town

== See also ==
- List of South Africa national rugby union players – Springbok no. 449
