= Albie Bates =

South African rugby union footballer (1941–2021)

- Born: Albert Jacobus Bates; 18 April 1941 Germiston, Gauteng
- Died: 26 October 2021 (aged 80) Pretoria, Gauteng
- Height: 1.92 m (6 ft 4 in)
- Weight: 94 kg (207 lb)
- School: Milner High School, Klerksdorp

Rugby union career
Provincial / State sides
Years	Team	Apps	(Points)
1965–	Western Transvaal		
- Northern Transvaal
International career
Years	Team	Apps	(Points)
1969–1972	South Africa	4	

Albert Jacobus Bates (18 April 1941 – 26 October 2021) was a South African rugby union player and coach.

== Playing career ==
Bates played his senior provincial rugby in South Africa for Western Transvaal and Northern Transvaal. He made his test debut for the Springboks during the 1969–70 tour of Britain and Ireland, against England at Twickenham. He also played test matches against the All Blacks in 1970 and the one-off test against England in 1972. He also played in fourteen tour matches, scoring one try for the Springboks.

=== Test history ===
No.	Opponents	Results (SA 1st)	Position	Tries	Dates	Venue
1.	England	8–11	Flank		20 December 1969	Twickenham, London
2.	New Zealand	17–6	Number eight		25 July 1970	Loftus Versfeld, Pretoria
3.	New Zealand	8–9	Number eight		8 August 1970	Newlands, Cape Town
4.	England	9–18	Number eight		3 June 1972	Ellis Park, Johannesburg

== See also ==
- List of South Africa national rugby union players – Springbok no. 438
