= 1971 Currie Cup =

Domestic rugby union competition

- Countries: South Africa
- Champions: Joint winners: Northern Transvaal (5th title); Transvaal (5th title)

The 1971 Currie Cup was the 33nd edition of the Currie Cup, the premier annual domestic rugby union competition in South Africa.

The tournament was jointly won by Northern Transvaal and Transvaal – the fifth time each of those teams won the competition – after the two teams drew 14–14 in the final in Johannesburg.

== Results ==
=== Semi-final ===
Transvaal	16–9 (Note: According to Rugby365, this match finished 16–9. However, according to SuperSport, Transvaal won 23–10.)	Natal	Ellis Park Stadium, Johannesburg
	Report

=== Final ===
Transvaal	14–14	Northern Transvaal	Ellis Park Stadium, Johannesburg
	Report		Referee: Gert Bezuidenhout

== See also ==
- Currie Cup
