= Yardley & District RFC =

(England) Yardley & District
- Full name: Yardley & District Rugby Football Club
- Union: North Midlands RFU
- Founded: 1971
- Location: Stechford, Birmingham, West Midlands, England
- Ground: Cole Hall Lane, Shard End
- Chairman: (England) Sean O'Sullivan
- President: (England) Bill Worth
- League: Midlands 4 West (North)
- 2019–20: 9th
| 1st kit | 2nd kit | 3rd kit |

Official website
- www.pitchero.com/clubs/yardleydistrict

Yardley & District RFC is an English rugby union club currently playing in the Midlands 4 West (North) Division.

== History ==
Yardley & District RFC was formed in May 1971, from the amalgamation of two clubs: Yardley Church Rugby Club, founded in 1954 by members of Yardley Church Youth Club; and the Old Biertonians RFC, founded in 1964 by the Old Boys of Bierton Road School.

The club used the Yardley name, with the addition of District to include the wider area, and also adopted Old Biertonians Rugby Club colours of royal blue and old gold. This would maintain an historical link with both original clubs.

Yardley Church Rugby Club originated from Yardley Parish Church Youth Club, known as the '13' club. They were composed entirely from boys attending the club. The ages ranging from 17-19 yrs, who themselves conceived the idea for a rugby club, formed it and ran it. Valuable help and support came from various people at the church, other clubs and the Birmingham City Parks Department, who loaned a good pitch at the Oaklands, Yardley.

The first posts to be used were wooden scaffold poles purchased from a local builder. Only one XV was run, although a junior XV was raised when occasion required. Opposition was found by playing various Grammar School teams. Many of the players, who were originally with the youth club, returned and played for the club, or when home from university.

Old Biertonians Rugby Football Club was formed from the old boys of Bierton Road School, which had a very successful rugby side, made up mostly of fifth formers, with much support from the school and staff. Such were the bonds of friendship, however, that they maintained contact and discussed the possibility of forming an Old Boys side, with advice and support from Mr R Parfitt Snr, a Police Cadet Rugby manager.

The idea became a reality and on 12 September 1964, they played their first fixture against, as it so happened, Yardley Church Rugby Club, at the Oakland's.

Old Biertonians, like Yardley had to rely on parks pitches and education grounds, changing home grounds quite frequently.

Yardley and Old Biertonians, both being local clubs, had regular fixtures over the years with a Boxing Day game becoming something of a tradition.

The new amalgamated club continued with their home pitch at 'The Oaklands' recreation ground, with the pitch marked out in front of the old wooden pavilion, which was subsequently destroyed by fire. Inaugural games held were a 1st XV game vs. a GKN works side, on Saturday 4 September 1971, which Yardley won 14 pts to 6 pts. A 2nd XV played against a Lucas 3rd works side, at Moor Lane Witton, which the 2nds also won 29 pts to 23 pts.

The club gained a reputation for providing a stern test on the field whilst entertaining the opposition in the tradition and codes of Rugby Football social life.

During the time at the Oaklands, the club used various local hostelries to entertain the opposition, with a period between 1978 and 1980 of a Sports Association with Sheldon Marlborough Cricket Club.

Yardley continued at the Oakland's, which was rented from Birmingham Corporation. The Oaklands will always be remembered for the famous slope and the extra wide in-goal area. In 1982 the club moved to a ground at'Whitlock's End' Shirley, Solihull. The club retained the use of the Oaklands, as an additional pitch, until 1984. 'Whitlock's End' Shirley, was taken over from a football club. With a clubhouse described as of a wooded nature and in need of some repair and decoration.

Yardley & District RFC, like many clubs, had its ups and downs, struggling for players at times, but eventually played memorable games and Easter tours within the fraternity of rugby football. In the words of one the earlier club coaches, 'Yardley would be unbeatable if they could only get the piano on to the pitch'.

In fact, the first Easter tour was in 1979, to Dublin, Ireland, playing the Catholic Colleges, losing 15–17, The Garda, which we won 9-6 and a touring Cardiff and District, which was lost 0-42.

The first interclub junior v seniors end of season game was played at The Oaklands in 1979, which the juniors won 14–0. This has been an annual fixture ever since.

Yardley & District RFC continued with their home ground at 'Whitlock's End' until March 1990, the year of 'The Great Fire', with loss of the club house and much of the club's history and memorabilia. Assistance was, however, at hand from the nearby Old Yardlieans RFC, who loaned a pitch and use of clubhouse facilities, until a move to the present clubhouse and ground at 'Colehall Lane', Shard End, during the 1992/3 season.

The club is currently in the Midland 4 West (North) League, running three sides and a Youth Section.

== Ground ==
The club plays its home games at Cole Hall Lane, Birmingham. The grounds consist of three pitches, one with floodlight facilities, which are used regularly by both senior and youth teams.

== Training ==
Training takes place at Cole Hall Lane on Tuesdays 7PM-9PM. Gym sessions are also open to all. Local Gym Central Fitness, Garretts Green Lane, Birmingham is where most Senior players weight train.

Yardley & District are proud the announce that former Lions, England and GB Rugby League international John Bentley held a training session with the club on Tuesday 11 January 2011.

== Personnel ==
| Name | Nationality | Role |
|---|---|---|
| Lloyd Winters | England | Club Captain |
| Liam Barrnett | England | 1st XV Captain |
| Leigh Griffin | England | 1st XV Vice-Captain |
| Dan Ward | England | 2nd XV Captain |
| Mike Rose | England | 2nd XV Vice-Captain |
| Paul Shwalbe | England | Fixtures Secretary |
| Lee Connor | England | Club Secretary |

== League table ==
Yardley and District are currently in Midlands 4 West (North)

== Sponsors ==
Sponsors of the club are:

- GEMSEC
- Platform Building Materials
- Musco Lighting
- Alcoa
- Highgate & Walsall Brewing Co. Ltd
- Challenger Tyres (Mick Rose)
- Phoenix Motor Service
- Aries Gas Services
- Sure Gas (David Walker)
- Steve Bunn Brickwork
- 'The Pickle Onion Man' (Derek Whitehead)

== Honours ==
- North Midlands 2 champions: 1997–98
- North Midlands Vase plate winners: 2017-18

== 2013/2014 season ==
Yardley & District had a tough 2013/2014 season, following the departure of a number of first team squad players . They were relegated to Midlands 4 West (North)

== 2014/2015 season ==
Yardley & District are playing in Midlands 4 West (North)

== Recognition ==
On 27 May 2010 North Midlands RFU held an awards ceremony at Worcester Warriors Sixways Stadium in recognition of volunteers at rugby clubs within the North Midlands. Many awards were up for grabs including Young Volunteer and Groundsman of the Year. But the main award for North Midlands Volunteer of the Year was won by Yardley & District's Lloyd Winters. Winters, a former player of Yardley & District, has been chairman of Yardley & District's youth section for 16 years and was a key figure in them becoming one of the first clubs in the country to attain RFU Seal of Approval status.

== Help for Heroes ==
On 30 March 2009, Yardley & District used its links with players and former players in the Royal Marines to organise a fundraising day to raise money for Help for Heroes. The day included an auction of rugby memorabilia which had been donated by local premiership rugby clubs and businesses in the area. The showpiece event of the day was a match between Yardley & District and a Royal Marines team, which included an appearance from Matthew Croucher who was awarded the George Cross in 2008 when he threw himself on a grenade to protect his colleagues while on active service in Afghanistan. The hard work by everyone involved in organising the day was rewarded with the club raising over £10,000 for the charity.

Following up on this success the club held a sporting dinner at the Paragon Hotel in Birmingham on 17 September 2010. The event raised £8,000 for Help for Heroes. With Willie John McBride - Irish & British & Irish Lions legend as the guest speaker, cross-code international John Bentley as compere for the evening along with the presence of top military personnel. In attendance was also current RFU President Richard Appleby and his predecessor, John Owen. Local celebrity Carl Chinn also attended the event.
