= Jan Webster =

England international rugby union player

- Full name: Jan Godfrey Webster
- Born: 24 August 1946 Southport, England
- Died: 5 February 2019 (aged 72)
- Height: 5 ft 5 in (165 cm)

Rugby union career
- Position: Scrum-half
International career
Years	Team	Apps	(Points)
1972–75	England	11	(0)

Jan Godfrey Webster (24 August 1946 — 5 February 2019) was an English rugby union international.

Webster was born in Southport but his family would soon move to Walsall. He attended Queen Mary's Grammar School and had ambitions to became a footballer until the age of 14, when an approach from Aston Villa manager Joe Mercer was turned down by his headmaster. His early rugby was played with Walsall RFC.

A scrum-half, Webster was capped 11 times for England in the early 1970s and is noted for his performances in two historic overseas victories. He was England's scrum-half in the country's first ever away win over the Springboks in 1972, as well as for the defeat of the All Blacks at Eden Park in 1973, which was the first win in New Zealand by a home nation. In both matches, he was rated to be among England's best players by pundits.

Webster played much of his club rugby for Moseley and competed at county level for Staffordshire.

== See also ==
- List of England national rugby union players
