= Piston van Wyk =

South African rugby union footballer (1943–2026)

- Born: Jacobus Frederick Beatrix van Wyk; 21 December 1943 Vereeniging, Transvaal, Union of South Africa
- Died: 9 August 2026 (aged 82) South Africa
- Height: 1.77 m (5 ft 10 in)
- Weight: 86 kg (190 lb)
- School: John Orr Technical High School, Johannesburg

Rugby union career
Provincial / State sides
Years	Team	Apps	(Points)
1970–1975	Northern Transvaal		
1976	Natal		
International career
Years	Team	Apps	(Points)
1970–1976	South Africa	15	

Jacobus Frederick Beatrix "Piston" van Wyk (21 December 1943 – 9 August 2026) was a South African rugby union player.

== Playing career ==
Van Wyk played most of his provincial rugby in South Africa with Northern Transvaal and also played one season with Natal. He made his test debut for the Springboks in 1970 against New Zealand at Loftus Versfeld in Pretoria and played in all four tests during the series against the touring All Blacks. In 1971 he played in the test series against France and Australia and in 1972, he was the hooker in the losing test against England at Ellis Park. He then played three tests against the 1974 British Lions and two tests against the 1976 All Blacks. He also played four tour matches for the Springboks.

=== Test history ===
No.	Opponents	Results (SA 1st)	Position	Tries	Dates	Venue
1.	New Zealand	17–6	Hooker		25 July 1970	Loftus Versfeld, Pretoria
2.	New Zealand	8–9	Hooker		8 August 1970	Newlands, Cape Town
3.	New Zealand	14–3	Hooker		29 August 1970	Boet Erasmus Stadium, Port Elizabeth
4.	New Zealand	20–17	Hooker		12 September 1970	Ellis Park, Johannesburg
5.	France	22–9	Hooker		12 June 1971	Free State Stadium, Bloemfontein
6.	France	8–8	Hooker		19 June 1971	Kings Park, Durban
7.	Australia	19–11	Hooker		17 July 1971	Sydney Cricket Ground, Sydney
8.	Australia	14–6	Hooker		31 July 1971	Brisbane Exhibition Ground, Brisbane
9.	Australia	18–6	Hooker		7 August 1971	Sydney Cricket Ground, Sydney
10.	England	9–18	Hooker		3 June 1972	Ellis Park, Johannesburg
11.	British Lions	3–12	Hooker		8 June 1974	Newlands, Cape Town
12.	(British & Irish Lions) British Lions	9–26	Hooker		13 July 1974	Boet Erasmus Stadium, Port Elizabeth
13.	(British & Irish Lions) British Lions	13–13	Hooker		27 July 1974	Ellis Park, Johannesburg
14.	New Zealand	15–10	Hooker		4 September 1976	Newlands, Cape Town
15.	New Zealand	15–14	Hooker		18 September 1976	Ellis Park, Johannesburg

== Death ==
Van Wyk died on 9 August 2026, at the age of 82.

== See also ==
- List of South Africa national rugby union players – Springbok no. 445
