= Birmingham Moseley Rugby =

English rugby union club, based in Birmingham

(England) Birmingham Moseley
- Full name: Birmingham Moseley Rugby Club
- Union: North Midlands RFU
- Nickname(s): Mose; Moseley Boys; Moseley Bears (historic)
- Founded: 1873; 153 years ago
- Location: Billesley Common, Birmingham, England
- Ground: Billesley Common (Capacity: 5,000 (1,300 seated))
- Coach(es): Max Stelling (Rugby Operations Manager); Ollie Thomas (Head Coach); Sam Pointon (Assistant Attack Coach & Performance Analyst); Rob Fuller (Forwards Coach); Rob Norman (S&C Coach)
- Captain: Ollie Stedman
- League: National League 1
- 2025–26: 11th
Team kit

Official website
- moseleyrugby.co.uk

Birmingham Moseley Rugby Club is an English rugby union club, based in Birmingham, that compete in the third tier of English rugby. They were historically the premier rugby club in Birmingham, reaching the final of the John Player Cup three times in the late 1970s and early 1980s. They originally played at the Reddings, but after attempting to keep up with the transition to professional rugby, the club ran into financial difficulties and were forced to sell their 125-year home to property developers. An unsuccessful five-year spell based at the University of Birmingham followed, during which time they were relegated to National Division Two. In 2005 the club moved to its new home at Billesley Common, and were promoted to National Division One in 2006. In 2009 they won their first cup in 27 years beating Leeds 23–18 in the final of the National Trophy at Twickenham. On the weekend starting 15 April 2016; defeat to Bristol, combined with results elsewhere during the same weekend, confirmed Moseley's relegation to National League 1 for the 2016–17 season.

Prior to the 2016–17 season, the club changed its name to Birmingham Moseley Rugby Club.

Birmingham Moseley currently play in National League 1, having defeated Luctonians and Oundle RFC in the 2025/26 National 1 Relegation Playoffs to stay in the league.

== History ==
=== Origins ===
==== Early days ====
Moseley was founded in 1873 by members of Havelock Cricket Club who wanted a winter sport when the cricket season had finished. The club debuted its signature red and black colours one year later. The Reddings was leased by the club in 1880 and the club was traditionally called, like many rugby football clubs from either code, simply "Moseley Football Club" (a signpost from Alcester Road along Reddings Road in Moseley, erected by Birmingham City Council, pointed to "Moseley F.C. (R.U.)". This sign has now been re-erected by the main entrance to the club grounds on Yardley Wood Road.)

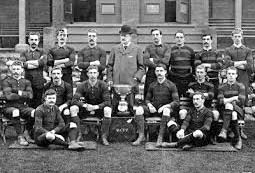
Moseley team of 1895

There were major successes for Moseley in the early days of rugby, including a three-year undefeated run from 1879 to 1882, which included winning the first Midland Counties Challenge Cup. In total they won the cup nine times and finished runner-up eleven times.

In 1882 Moseley became the first team to defeat the travelling New Zealand Native football team. In front of 5000 supporters they beat the tourists 6-4 much to the surprise of the New Zealanders. In 1890 John Rogers was the first Moseley player to win an international cap while at the club.

==== 1900 Paris Olympics ====
Moseley formed the backbone of the team which represented Great Britain at the 1900 Paris Olympics winning a Silver medal. The team, known as Moseley Wanderers, played one game, a 27–8 defeat to France at the Velodrome Municipal at Vincennes. A report in The Times suggested that fatigue was largely to blame, and at least five of the players are believed to have played for their respective clubs, in England, the day before the game.

=== The golden years ===
The club acquired the freehold of The Reddings in 1925 and in 1935 the ground even staged an England trial game. Floodlights were installed in 1965 which allowed for an expanded fixture list and began Moseley's so-called 'The Golden Years'. From this time onwards Moseley's fixture list routinely included the top sides in England and Wales, and Moseley players were regularly included in international teams. The most successful years were the late 1960s and 1970s, this included reaching the RFU Knock-out cup final on three occasions – losing 17–6 to Gloucester and then 15–12 to Leicester before emerging joint winners drawing 12–12 with Gloucester after extra time in 1982. The team also defeated Fiji and the Barbarians.

When league rugby commenced in 1987, the team was placed in the Courage National Division 1, the top division at the time. They ended Bath's astonishing run of 22 unbeaten cup matches in 1988, winning 4–3.

=== Professional era ===
==== Building for the future ====
The team's relegation from the top division at the end of the 1990–1991 season marked a consolidation period for the club after their fantastic times of the 1970s. In August 1995, when the door to full-scale professionalism opened, the board executives came together to work on plans to move with the idea and find possible financial resources so that the team could play with the best team and best facilities. As part of the move to professionalism the club undertook a soft re-brand as the 'Moseley Bears' complete with a bear mascot.

==== Administration – leaving the Reddings ====
On 30 January 1998, the club went into administration, after overstretching its financial resources in the early years of professional rugby union. The Reddings had been sold on a 'delayed sale' basis to Bryant Homes and the future of the club was in jeopardy. However, the club's playing commitments were still fulfilled except in the North Midlands Cup in which the 2nd XV was entered. On 12 June 1998, the club was given another chance to fashion its own destiny when a group of Moseley Rugby Club members, assembled by Simon Cooper, a former club player and official, formed Moseley Ventures Ltd and bought the club out of administration. In the last 1st XV match at The Reddings on 6 May 2000, Moseley defeated Worcester 34–17 in a National Division One game.

==== The Bournbrook Era – crisis and final rescue ====
On 7 October Moseley defeated Exeter 27–18 in the first match at its new home at the University of Birmingham in Bournbrook. However long-term permissions for a clubhouse and hospitality boxes were not granted and in consequence Moseley Ventures found it more difficult than expected to raise the necessary finance. Merger plans were discussed and an offer was made by Firoz Kassam, the chairman of Oxford United Football Club with a proposal to buy out the club and take it to his new stadium in Oxford. Supporters organized a major media and political campaign and this became the catalyst for a consortium of Moseley stalwarts to come forward to raise finance to defeat the Kassam offer. At a predictably traumatic meeting at the Grand Hotel on 26 July 2002, the consortium gained the support of the creditors by a narrow 1.7% majority regarded by some as a Pyrrhic victory. However, the consortium's business plan was approved by the RFU and with additional backing by the politicians of the City of Birmingham and the North Midlands RFU, the club survived in Birmingham. So a new Moseley Rugby Club was born and appointed David Warren as Chief Executive and former players John Beale and Derek Nutt as Director of Rugby and Head Coach respectively. Negotiations for planning permission for a new stadium at Billesley Common, in the same postal district as The Reddings, began and permission was obtained.

However, despite the success of the consortium in keeping the club in Birmingham a large number of first-team regulars had left the club at the end of the 2001–02 season. The team hastily assembled from more junior ranks after the rescue was inevitably relegated from National Division One (after 14 seasons in the top two divisions). After a difficult first few months in National Division Two the team began to gel, and a decent run of results in the new year saw mid-table respectability achieved for the 2003–04 season.

Further improvement during the 2004–05 season saw Moseley finishing third in the table, narrowly missing promotion behind Doncaster and Newbury. Nonetheless, the season saw many club records broken, and the era of lodging at Birmingham University ended with much optimism for the future.

The records broken were:

- Most team points: 665 points
- Most Consecutive Victories: 6
- Most individual points in a season: 328 (Ollie Thomas)
- Most conversions in a season: 48 (Ollie Thomas)
- Most penalties in a season: 62 (Ollie Thomas)
- Most drop goals in a season: 7 (Ollie Thomas)
- Most consecutive scoring matches (points): 15 (Ollie Thomas)
- Most league appearances: 161 (Andy Binns)
- Most penalties in a career: 62 (Ollie Thomas)
- Most consecutive matches: 70 (and counting - Gareth Taylor)

=== Recent seasons ===
==== 2005–06 season ====
The first season at the new stadium on Billesley Common saw Moseley installed as favourites to gain promotion to higher echelons of the English game. Coaches Ian Smith and Don Caskie, along with Director of Rugby John Beale assembled a strong team, now including ex-Premiership players Neil Mason and Daren O'Leary. Moseley topped the table for much of the season and indeed finished as champions ahead of Waterloo. Both teams gained promotion to National Division One.

==== 2006–07 season ====
After the euphoria of promotion, the new season was much more difficult for the club. Most of the promotion-winning squad was retained, and with some additions the team showed promise in the early games, including a defeat of highly fancied Bedford. However, a string of defeats up to Christmas against top teams, with even bonus points being hard to come by, left Moseley facing a difficult task to survive. A brief rally in December and January, including a win against traditional "best enemies" Coventry proved vital in the long run, and towards the end of the season, with Waterloo already doomed, Otley flagged badly enough for Moseley to overhaul them and win a second season in National One.

==== 2007–08 season ====
For this season, a highly imaginative agreement was made with Gloucester whereby all of Gloucester's England Academy players were dual-registered with Moseley, enabling them to get competitive match experience when not required by the Gloucester 1st XV. The club finished the season in an improved 10th place with 12 wins and a draw, beating every side from 7th downwards either home or away. Two victories against top six sides included Nottingham (3rd) away and Cornish Pirates (5th) at home. A lack of bonus points meant that while they had the same playing record (W12 D1) they finished 6 points adrift of 8th placed Plymouth.

==== 2008–09 season ====
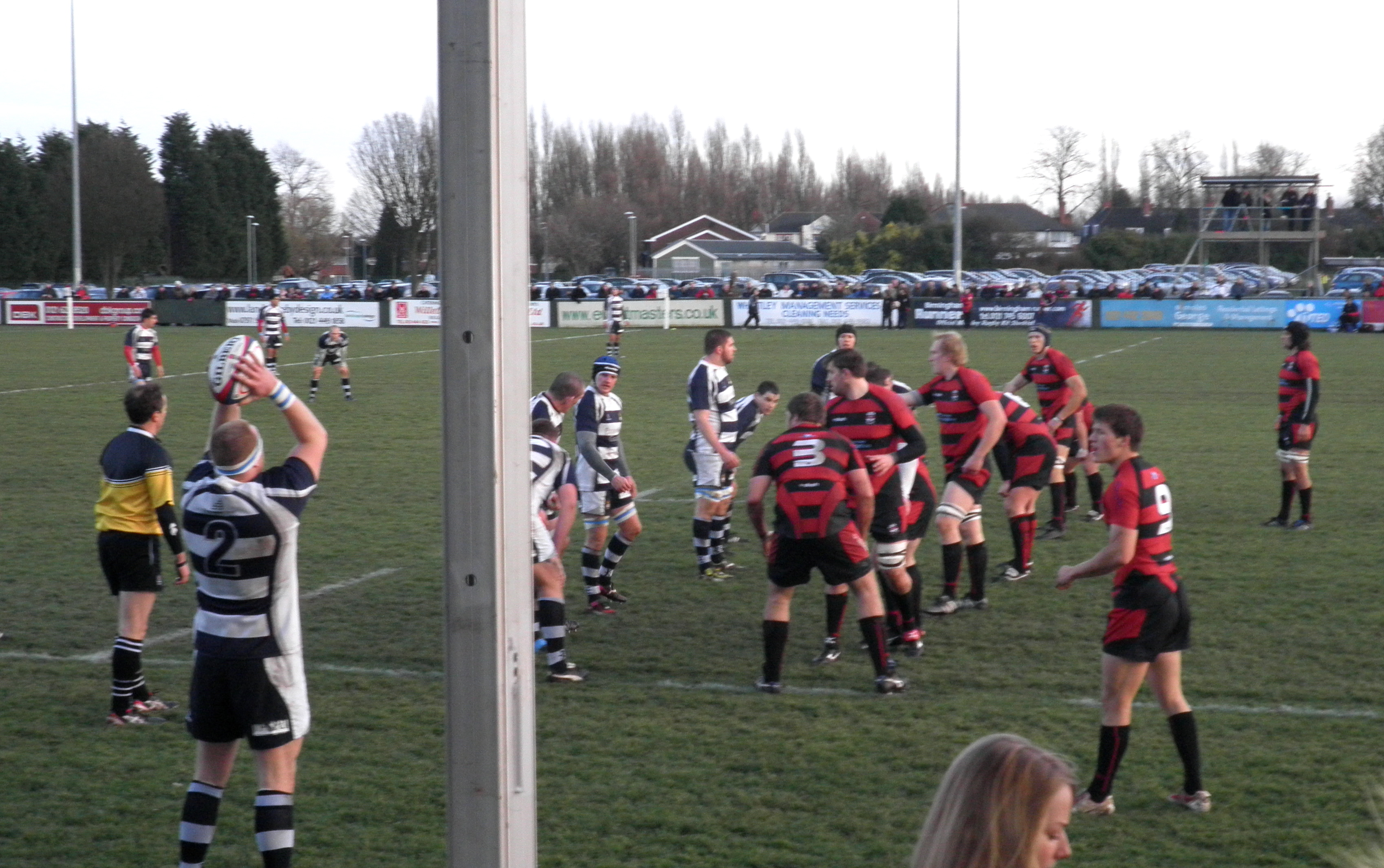
Moseley against Coventry in the 2009 Boxing Day Derby at Billesley

The season commenced with the dual-registration agreement with Gloucester still in place, although refined in detail, and the bulk of the previous season's squad retained with some judicious recruitment in particular positions. Together with the heavily criticised plan to reduce National Division One from 16 to 12 teams and a fixture backlog caused by a number cancellations, the team hovered just above and around the relegation zone for most of the season. Despite facing the threat of relegation they won the National Trophy beating National Division One runners up Exeter Chiefs in the semi-final and the division winners Leeds Carnegie in the final. A final league position of eighth represented continued upward progress over a period of five seasons.

==== 2009–10 season ====
Despite having their moments, most notably a final day 30–25 victory over Bristol, Moseley did not perform on a consistent enough basis and despite finishing only two points behind 8th place, were lucky not to be relegated after a poor performance in the relegation play-off. After an early season defeat to Exeter Chiefs, who would later earn promotion, Moseley managed victories away to local rivals Birmingham and Solihull and Coventry; however they lost at home to Nottingham and London Welsh to late tries, a regular occurrence that would cost them later in the season. Moseley never threatened to be anything other than mid-table, however they had hopes of at least finishing in the top 8, but even their heroic last day performance was not enough to reach the promotion play-offs.

An away defeat to Birmingham and Solihull and a home loss against Rotherham meant that Moseley were in grave danger of relegation. A scrappy game at Butts Park Arena resulted in a narrow 6–3 loss, but a spirited away victory over Rotherham and a nervy win against Coventry at Billesley Common by a score were enough to guarantee another season in the second tier. A terrible defensive display led to another defeat to Birmingham and Solihull, but fortunately it did not matter. However at the end of the season Moseley lost Aly Muldowney, who was the current Supporters' Player of the Season, to Glasgow Warriors, former Supporters' Player of the Season and England Sevens International James Rodwell, top points scorer Tristan Roberts to Championship rivals Doncaster, and released a number of players including the disappointing Justin Mensah-Coker.

== Facilities ==
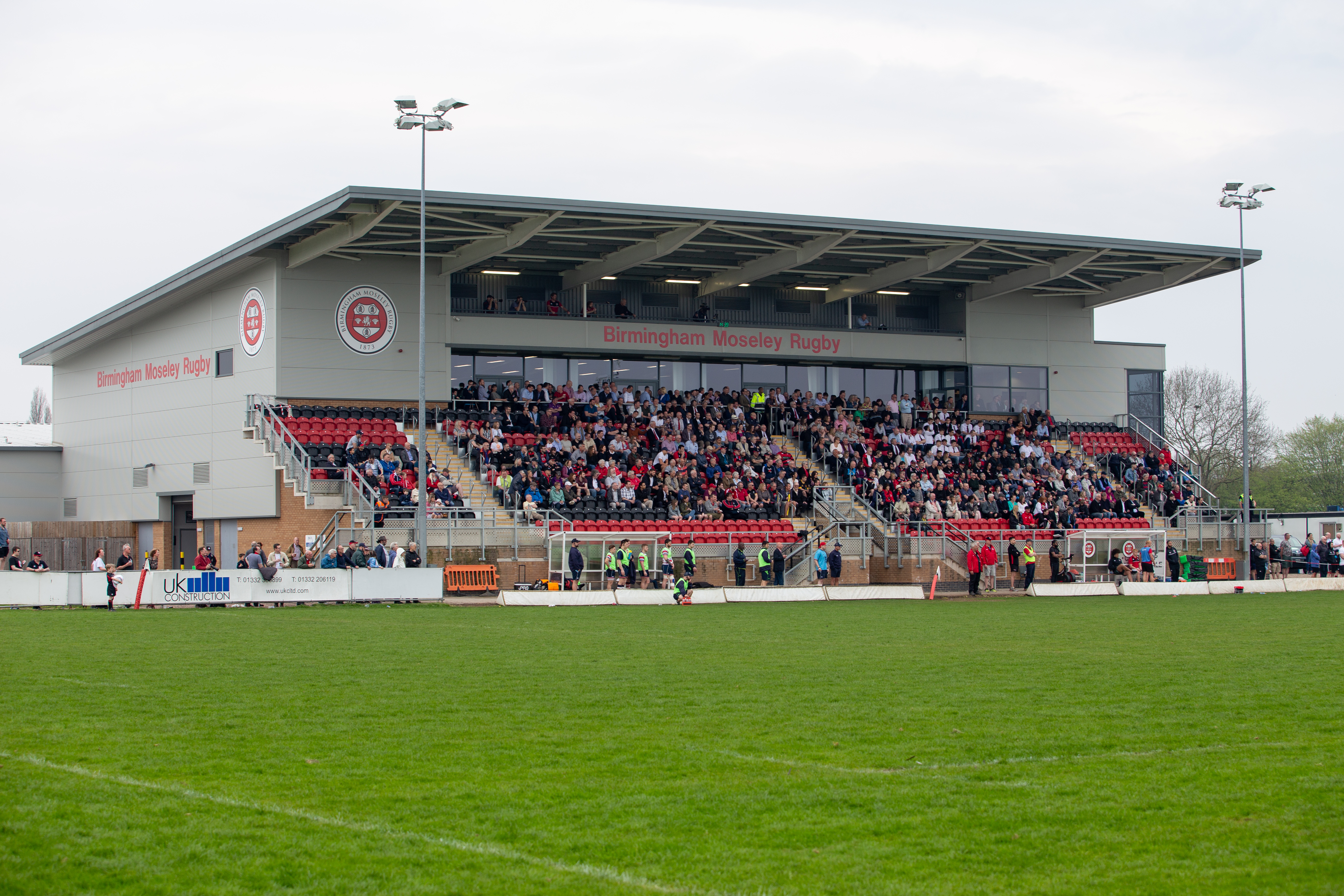
Birmingham Moseley Rugby Grandstand, pictured in 2018

Since 2005 Moseley have played at Billesley Common, which is owned by Birmingham City Council, and they now have a long-term lease on an area to the north of the site where the club's facilities and 1st XV pitch are located. These temporary facilities include a clubhouse and changing facilities, a covered stand, club shop, and hospitality boxes. The pitch is extremely highly rated for its playing surface, although it gently slopes to the north-east. There are also outer pitches on the common for the 2nd/development XV, colts, women, minis and juniors as well as an all-weather pitch featuring the latest rubber-crumb technology which the club manages.

Plans for the replacement of the temporary facilities at Billesley with permanent buildings were first exhibited to the general public in 2007. In the autumn of 2009 plans were formally submitted to Birmingham City Council for the construction of a 5000-seat stand along the east side of the pitch, allowing the overall capacity to be expanded to 7500. Planning approval was granted by councillors on 21 January 2010. However, with finance for the construction of this stand proving difficult to obtain in a difficult economic climate, an alternative plan for a more modest construction was progressed, in the form of a stand with 750 seats on the west side of the pitch, containing player facilities, bars and function room. This opened in April 2015. The south Birmingham indoor bowls centre was constructed at the same time and backs onto this stand. With the relocation of the 650-seat temporary stand to the east side of the ground, this now gives seated capacity of 1,300.

== Supporters ==
The Moseley Supporters Association was originally established as 'The Members Committee' in 1986. When Moseley left the Reddings in 2000, like the club the Association struggled to maintain its support and it was disbanded in 2001. However the Association was reformed in 2010, organising social events and competitions at home matches and running coaches to away games. The Association also organise annual Supporters Player of the Season, with the winner receiving the Lionel Moriaty Memorial Boot.

=== Rivalries ===
Moseley's historic local rivals are Coventry. Prior to the commencement of league the two clubs would play each other annually on Boxing Day for the 'Moseley Trophy' and on one occasion in 1972 the starting line up at the fixture included 16 internationals. Since league rugby began the clubs are only able to keep up this tradition when in the same league, although the friendly rivalry between the fans remains. When playing Northampton the two clubs play for 'The Teddy Brookes Trophy' although they have rarely been in the same league in recent years.

More recently there has been less friendly rivalries with Birmingham & Solihull and Worcester Warriors. However, since Moseley's relegation to National League 1 the rivalry between Moseley and Coventry has returned.

== Honours ==
=== Men's 1st team ===
==== Cups ====
- Midland Counties Cup
  - Winners (9): 1882, 1884, 1885, 1886, 1887, 1889, 1895, 1897, 1925
  - Runners-up (11): 1883, 1892, 1896, 1898, 1900, 1901, 1902, 1904, 1906, 1911, 1923 (Note: Moseley were also runners-up in the 1914 Midland Counties Cup but the result was later declared void.)
- John Player Cup
  - Winners: 1982 (joint holders)
  - Runners-up (2): 1972, 1979
- National Trophy
  - Winners: 2009

==== League ====
- National Division Two
  - Winners 2005–06

=== Women's team ===
The women's team was founded in 2000 and have been progressing ever since. In 2020 they started a second team Moseley Griffins as a development team. Most recently they are playing in National Challenge 1 Midlands (West), Level 4 of the Women's pyramid.

==== League ====
National Championship 2

- National Challenge Midlands 1
  - Champions: 2009
- National Challenge 2 Midlands West
  - Champions: 2008

=== Moseley Oak ===
- North Midlands 3
  - Champions: 1987–88
- North Midlands 2
  - Champions: 1991–92
- Midlands West 2
  - Champions: 1995–96
- Midlands 2 West (North)
  - Champions (2): 1999–00, (Note: 1999-00 Midlands 2 West (North) title was won when league was a single division known as Midlands West 1.) 2015–16
- North Midlands Shield
  - Champions: 2021–22
- Regional 2 West Midlands
  - Champions: 2025-26

== Teams ==
Moseley field a full range of teams from the professional level of the 1st XV through all age groups. These are as follows:

1. 1st XV – Professional team, competing in National League 1, the third tier of the RFU league "pyramid".
2. Moseley Oak – The amateur club affiliated to Moseley, also playing at Billesley Common, after winning promotion from Regional 2 Midlands West, they will play in Regional 1, the fifth tier of the RFU league "pyramid" in 2026/27.
3. Moseley Oak 2nds - Also known as the Vikings, after years of friendly fixtures will enter Counties 4 Midlands West Central (Level 10) in the 2026/27 season.
4. Women's XV – For the 2026/27 season, the Women's XV will be competing in Women's Midlands Championship 2 after winning promotion during the 2025/26 season.
5. Colts – U18 and U17 age groups, competing in National and County competitions.
6. Juniors – U16, U15, U14 and U13 age group teams, playing friendly games against other local clubs .
7. Minis – U7 to U12, and Micros for the very youngest. All except micros play friendly matches against other local clubs. Girls and boys play in the same teams up to U12.
8. Moseley Griffins - Women's 2nd/Development XV - started 2019/2020 season

== Current standings ==
2026–27 National League 1 table
Pos	Team	Pld	W	D	L	PF	PA	PD	TB	LB	Pts	Qualification
1	Plymouth Albion	9	9	0	0	471	151	+320	9	0	45	Promotion place
2	Tonbridge Juddians	9	8	0	1	368	316	+52	9	0	41	Promotion play-off
3	Camborne	9	8	0	1	378	272	+106	8	0	40	Promotion play-off
4	Leeds Tykes	9	6	0	3	324	239	+85	7	3	34	
5	Sale FC	9	6	0	3	375	264	+111	7	2	33	
6	Rosslyn Park	9	5	0	4	343	287	+56	8	1	29	
7	London Scottish	9	4	0	5	330	344	−14	7	2	25	
8	Birmingham Moseley	9	4	0	5	249	312	−63	6	1	23	
9	Bishop's Stortford	9	3	0	6	322	362	−40	8	2	22	
10	Dings Crusaders	9	2	1	6	331	393	−62	8	3	21	
11	Bury St Edmunds	9	3	0	6	237	354	−117	6	0	18	Relegation play-off
12	Rams	9	2	1	6	229	304	−75	6	2	18	Relegation place
13	Sheffield	9	2	0	7	228	334	−106	6	3	17	Relegation place
14	Cambridge	9	0	0	9	240	493	−253	5	3	8	Relegation place

Updated to match(es) played on 7 November 2026. Source: National League Rugby
Rules for classification: If teams are level at any stage, tiebreakers are applied in the following order:
1. Number of matches won
2. Number of matches drawn
3. Difference between points for and against
4. Total number of points for
5. Aggregate number of points scored in matches between tied teams
6. Number of matches won excluding the first match, then the second and so on until the tie is settled

== Notable former players ==
See also Category:Moseley Rugby Football Club players

The following is a list of international players who have played for Moseley.

- (Canada) Oliver Atkinson *
- (England) Rev. E. M. Baker *
- (England) Simon Robson *
- (England) William Bunting *§
- (England) F. A. Byrne *
- (England) J. F. Byrne *§†
- (Canada) Al Charron *
- (England) R. H. B. Cattell *
- (Hong Kong) Jack Combes *
- (England) J. G. Cooper *
- (England) Martin Cooper *
- (England) Barrie Corless *
- (England) Mike Coulman *†
- (England) Peter Cranmer *§
- (England) Les Cusworth
- (Namibia) Ryan De La Harpe *
- (Jamaica) Morgan Dawes *
- (England) Sam Doble *
- (England) A. L. Dowson *
- (Nigeria) Tuoyo Egodo *
- (England) Guy Evers *†
- (Ireland) C. Fagan *
- (Poland) Thomas Fidler *
- (England) Keith Fielding *
- (England) John Finlan *
- (Scotland) Percy Friebe
- (Ireland) T.J. Gavin *
- (Scotland) Alex Grove
- (England) Martin Hale *
- (Canada) A. R. A. Healy *
- (Wales) Cory Hill
- (England) Simon Hodgkinson
- (England) Nigel Horton *
- (Ireland) H. D. Hurley *
- (England) Nick Jeavons *
- (England) Mark Linnett *
- (England) Colin McFadyean *§†
- (Wales) Steve Moore *
- (England) Steve Ojomoh
- (Ireland) Darragh O'Mahony
- (England) Peter Robbins *
- (Ireland) Alain Rolland
- (England) John Rogers *
- (England) C. H. Shaw *
- (Scotland) Ian Smith *
- (England) Mike Teague *†
- (England) Victor Ubogu
- (England) Craig Voisey
- (England) Jan Webster *
- (England) Brian Wightman *
- (Wales) Andy Williams
- (Canada) Kevin Wirachowski *

* Capped by country while at the club
§ Captain of England
† British Lions international cap

=== Sam Doble ===
Perhaps Moseley's most famous player, Sam Doble was a record points scorer for the club who died of cancer in 1977 at the age of 33. His life was honoured in a special match between an International XV and Moseley, played to a packed Reddings. When Moseley moved to their new ground at nearby Billesley Common in 2005, 28 years later, many suggested that it should be called the Sam Doble Stadium.

== International opposition ==
Year	Date	Opponent	Result	Score	Tour
1888	13 October	New Zealand Native team	Win	6–4	
1973	22 September	Fiji	Win	25–12	1973 Fiji Tour to the British Isles

== See also ==
- List of Moseley R.F.C. seasons
