= North Midlands Rugby Football Union =

English sport governing body

(England) North Midlands RFU
- Full name: North Midlands Rugby Football Union
- Union: Rugby Football Union
- Founded: 1920; 106 years ago
- Region: West Midlands Conurbation, West Midlands, Herefordshire, Worcestershire Shropshire.
Team kit

Official website
- www.northmidsrfu.co.uk

The North Midlands Rugby Football Union is a governing body for rugby union in The Midlands, England. The union is the constituent body of the Rugby Football Union for the counties of Herefordshire, Shropshire, Worcestershire and the West Midlands area.

== History ==
The North Midlands RFU was founded at a meeting in Birmingham on 14 January 1920. The area had previously been part of the Midland Counties Rugby Union, from which Warwickshire split in 1914, with further changes in 1919 leading to Leicestershire Rugby Union becoming a county on its own and North Midlands being created for the Birmingham, Derbyshire, Staffordshire and Worcestershire areas. The majority of the clubs in the union's initial membership came from the Birmingham area. Staffordshire separated from North Midlands in 1964 to become a county on its own.

== County team ==
The North Midlands men's county team play in the County Championship, competing in Division 2 as of the 2023 tournament.

Honours

- Tetley's County Shield winners: 2004

== Affiliated clubs ==
Among the Clubs affiliated with the North Midlands RFU, most have teams at both senior and junior level, although some of the more prominent second teams have also been listed by the North Midlands RFU as affiliated clubs. The North Midlands region covers a large area with club sides based in Greater Birmingham RFU, Hereford & Worcestershire RFU and Shropshire RFU.

- Aldridge
- Aston Old Edwardians
- Aston University
- Birmingham Barbarians
- Birmingham Bulls
- Birmingham Exiles
- Birmingham Medics
- Birmingham MoseleyMoseley Oak are the amateur side of Birmingham Moseley RFC
- Birmingham & Solihull
- Bishops Castle & Onny Valley
- Bournville
- Bredon Star
- Bridgnorth
- Bromsgrove
- Bromyard
- Camp Hill
- Chaddesley Corbett
- Clee Hill
- Cleobury Mortimer
- Droitwich
- Dudley Kingswinford
- Dudley Wasps (Note: Dudley Wasps are the 3rd team of Dudley Kingswinford RFC.)
- Edwardians
- Erdington
- Evesham
- Five Ways Old Edwardians
- Greyhound
- Harborne
- Harper Adams University
- Hereford
- Kidderminster Carolians
- Kings Norton
- Ledbury
- Luctonians
- Ludlow
- Malvern
- Market Drayton
- Newport (Salop)
- Old Halesonians
- Old Saltleians
- Old Yardleians
- Oswestry
- Pershore
- Redditch
- Ross-on-Wye
- Shrewsbury
- Solihull
- Stourbridge
- Stourport
- Telford Hornets
- Tenbury Wells
- University of Birmingham RFC
- Upton-upon-Severn
- Veseyans
- Warley
- West Mercia Police
- West Midlands Police
- Whitchurch
- Woodrush
- Worcester
- Worcester Students RFC
- Yardley & District

== County club competitions ==
The North Midlands currently runs the following competition for clubs sides based in Birmingham and the West Midlands, Herefordshire, Shropshire and Worcestershire:

=== Cups ===
- North Midlands Cup – founded in 1972, currently open to clubs at tiers 5–6 of the English rugby union system
- North Midlands Shield – founded in 2001, clubs at tiers 7–8
- North Midlands Vase – founded in 2005, clubs at tiers 9–10

=== Discontinued competitions ===
- North Midlands 1 - tier 7-10 league that ran between 1987 and 2006
- North Midlands 2 - tier 8-11 league that ran between 1987 and 2006
- North Midlands 3 – tier 9-12 league that ran intermittently between 1987 and 2004
- North Midlands 4 – tier 10 league that ran between 1987 and 1992
- Midlands 5 West (North) (Note: Midlands 5 West (North) was known as Midlands 6 West (North) between 2005 and 2009.) – tier 10 league for North Midlands and Staffordshire clubs that ran between 2005 and 2019

== See also ==
- Midland Division
- English rugby union system
