= Charles Fagan (Alabama politician) =

American politician

Charles Fagan was an American state legislator in Alabama. He represented Montgomery County, Alabama in the Alabama House of Representatives. He lived in Montgomery, Alabama.

He joined fellow legislators in signing a memorial alleging abuses that occurred in Alabama.

His name is listed on a historical marker along with other African Americans who served in the Alabama legislature during the Reconstruction era.

== See also ==
- African American officeholders from the end of the Civil War until before 1900
