= Gert Muller (rugby union, born 1948) =

South African rugby union footballer

- Born: Gert Hendrik Muller; 10 May 1948 (age 78) Vryheid, KwaZulu-Natal
- Height: 1.83 m (6 ft 0 in)
- Weight: 90 kg (198 lb)
- School: Port Natal High School, Durban
- University: Stellenbosch University

Rugby union career
Amateur team(s)
Years	Team	Apps	(Points)
- Maties
Provincial / State sides
Years	Team	Apps	(Points)
1969–1971	Western Province	23	
1972–1974	Transvaal	26	
International career
Years	Team	Apps	(Points)
1969–1974	South Africa	14	(12)

Gert Hendrik Muller (born 10 May 1948) is a former South African rugby union player.

== Playing career ==
Muller represented the Natal Schools team at the 1965 annual Craven Week tournament and after finishing school, he furthered his studies at Stellenbosch University. He made his senior provincial debut for Western Province in 1969 and in 1972 he relocated to Johannesburg and continued his playing career with Transvaal.

Muller made his test debut for the Springboks in 1969 against the touring Australian team in the third test played at Newlands in Cape Town on 6 September 1969. At the end of 1969 he toured with the Springboks to Britain and Ireland, playing in the first test against Scotland and the fourth and last test on the tour, against Wales. He also toured with South Africa to Australia in 1971 but broke his nose in a tour match and did not play in any tests. Muller also played in test matches against New Zealand, England, France and the 1974 British Lions. During his career, he played fourteen test matches, scoring four tries, as well as six tour matches, scoring eleven tries, for the Springboks.

=== Test history ===
No.	Opponents	Results (SA 1st)	Position	Tries	Dates	Venue
1.	Australia	11–3	Wing		6 September 1969	Newlands, Cape Town
2.	Australia	19–8	Wing		20 September 1969	Free State Stadium, Bloemfontein
3.	Scotland	3–6	Wing		6 December 1969	Murrayfield, Edinburgh
4.	Wales	6–6	Wing		24 January 1970	National Stadium, Cardiff
5.	New Zealand	17–6	Wing		25 July 1970	Loftus Versfeld, Pretoria
6.	New Zealand	8–9	Wing		8 August 1970	Newlands, Cape Town
7.	New Zealand	14–3	Wing	2	29 August 1970	Boet Erasmus Stadium, Port Elizabeth
8.	New Zealand	20–17	Wing	1	12 September 1970	Ellis Park, Johannesburg
9.	France	22–9	Wing	1	12 June 1971	Free State Stadium, Bloemfontein
10.	France	8–8	Wing		19 June 1971	Kings Park, Durban
11.	England	9–18	Wing		3 June 1972	Ellis Park, Johannesburg
12.	British Lions	3–12	Wing		8 June 1974	Newlands, Cape Town
13.	(British & Irish Lions) British Lions	9–26	Wing		13 July 1974	Boet Erasmus, Port Elizabeth
14.	(British & Irish Lions) British Lions	13–13	Wing		27 July 1974	Ellis Park, Johannesburg

== See also ==
- List of South Africa national rugby union players – Springbok no. 361
