= Dudley Kingswinford RFC =

English rugby union club, based in the West Midlands

Dudley Kingswinford
- Full name: Dudley Kingswinford Rugby Football Club
- Union: North Midlands RFU
- Founded: 1920; 106 years ago
- Location: Kingswinford, England
- Ground: Heathbrook (Capacity: 2,260 (260 seats))
- Chairman: Jonathan Knowles
- President: Ken Crane
- Captain: Dan Marsh
- League: Regional 1 Midlands
- 2024–25: 10th
Team kit

Official website
- dkrugby.rfu.club

Dudley Kingswinford Rugby Football Club is an English rugby union football club based in Kingswinford in the West Midlands. The club currently participate in the fifth tier of English club rugby, Regional 1 Midlands, following their relegation from National League 2 West in 2023–24. The club run seven senior sides, a ladies team and a full range of junior sides.

== Early history ==
The club was founded in May 1920. Known in its early years as the Bean Football Club, the name Dudley Kingswinford was adopted in 1927. After playing at several grounds the club moved to its current premises in 1962.

== Ground ==
Dudley Kingswinford play home games at Heathbrook, located on the western outskirts of Wall Heath, Kingswinford. The ground is most accessible by car with the nearest train station being Stourbridge Town railway station, over 5 miles away. The ground has four full-size pitches (1st XV, 2nd XV, 3rd XV and training), along with five pitches for youth rugby (under-9 to under-13).

The ground capacity for the 1st XV pitch is approximately 2,260, with 260 seated in the main stand and an estimated 2,000 standing pitch side including on the grass banks and by the clubhouse.

== Honours ==
1st team:

- Staffordshire Cup winners (2): 1967, 1969
- North Midlands Cup winners (5): 1977, 1979, 1989, 2000, 2012
- NPI Cup finalists: 1999
- Midlands Division 1 champions: 1999–00
- Midlands Division 1 West champions (2): 2010–11, 2019–20
- National League 3 (north v midlands) promotion play-off winner: 2011–12
- Regional 1 Midlands winners: 2022–23

2nd team (Dudley Wasps):

- Midlands 6 West (South-West) champions: 2006–07
- North Midlands Vase winners: 2011

== Full internationals ==
Shaun Perry -England. Dudley Kingswinford 1985-2003
