= Stourbridge R.F.C. =

English rugby union team, based in Staffordshire

Stourbridge
- Full name: Stourbridge Rugby Football Club
- Union: North Midlands RFU
- Nickname: Panthers
- Founded: 1876; 150 years ago
- Location: Stourbridge, Staffordshire, England
- Region: Midlands
- Ground: Stourton Park (Capacity: 3,500 (499 seats))
- Chairman: Brian Jordan
- President: Trevor Jordan
- Coach: Joseph Jordan
- Most caps: Huw Davies
- Top scorer: Ben Harvey (989 points)
- League: Regional 1 Midlands
- 2025–26: 3rd
1st kit	2nd kit

Official website
- www.stourbridgerugby.com

Stourbridge RFC is a rugby union side based in Stourbridge, West Midlands and play in the fifth tier of the English rugby union league system; Regional 1 Midlands. They play their home games at Stourton Park, which was redeveloped in 2003 to provide a larger clubhouse and social area which can also be used for weddings and other functions. The ground is in the hamlet of Stourton set amongst the Staffordshire countryside, on the outskirts of the town of Stourbridge.

== History ==
Stourbridge RFC was founded in 1876 as a branch of the Stourbridge Cricket Club and shared the cricket ground in Amblecote. As association football flourished, the rugby section was ousted and from 1883 rugby football soldiered on in a variety of locations throughout the town, with the highlight being a mini golden era in the two seasons 1887–88 and 1888–89 when only four games were lost out of a total of 37. Despite this success on the field of play, interest in the game seems to have waned and after two lacklustre seasons the club was forced to disband in 1893. There was a brief but inadequately supported revival in 1907–08.

Life The National League 2 has witnessed a highly competitive landscape, with only four of the fourteen clubs maintaining their presence in the division for more than three consecutive seasons during the league’s initial twenty seasons. Stourbridge has been notable among National Clubs Association (NCA) teams for experiencing only one change in league status a promotion during that period.

While competing in National League two Sturbridge twice finished 11th narrowly, avoiding regulation, before improving to mid table finishes of seventh and eighth in the following two seasons.

Neil Mitchell, who began and concluded his plane career at Storton Park after a lengthy spell with Mosley became director of rugby in 2004 during his tenure the club appointed Marcus Cookand Jim Jenner as player coacheswith responsibility for the backs and forwards respectively. In June 2010 Sturbridge appointment.South Africa international genius Delport as player coach.

There was a 1933–34 season when only two games were lost and apart from the break during the Second World War, the club has ever since. So much so that only in four out of the 56 post-war seasons until entry to National 2 in 2001 did the club end up with a losing record. The products of school and club were Bob Lloyd-Jones (Moseley), Huw Davies (Coventry and Wasps) and Peter Shillingford (Moseley).

In 1965–66, the club moved to its present freehold site at Stourton; 11 acres (4.5 ha), expanded later to 15 acres (6.1 ha) and now possesses four senior pitches and two mini pitches, two sets of floodlights. In 1996–97, it completed a 450-seater grandstand. The clubhouse, a two-storey structure, has been extended and regularly refurbished so that it contains a gymnasium, a major clubroom, two members’ rooms and a viewing ledge, commonly known as "Banter Balcony" to the Stourbridge faithful. The tradition of regular improvement and repair probably reached its peak in 2002 with a £300,000 addition of twin towers to the clubhouse, improving and extending changing, administration and social facilities. A new set of floodlights were installed in 2007 on the first XV pitch. Club developments continued in 2016 when floodlights on the training pitch were upgraded and extended to cover both training pitches, providing further floodlight training capacity.

When the league system was introduced in 1987, Stourbridge were put in the National Leagues. Area League North in those days consisted of eleven teams and only involved ten fixtures a season. Stourbridge remained in that league for 15 years, the only club to do so, and then, at long last, were promoted to National 2 in 2001. They had flirted with promotion (but never with relegation) throughout that period, but their most spectacular achievements were in successive years 1998–99 and 1999–2000, when they ended up in a frustrating second place, playing attractive attacking rugby and smashing the league record for the number of tries a season, averaging well over 5 tries a game. Following that infamous law that dominates such situations, play–offs were introduced the following year. During their promotion season, Stourbridge maintained an unbeaten home record for the only time in its history.

Life in National 2 is as a player coach.

There is also a Minis and Juniors section for children aged 6–18.

== Ground ==
The club has been based at their present ground, Stourton Park, since 1965. When Stourbridge began life in the Courage leagues in 1987, the capacity was listed as being around 2,000 all-standing. The capacity increased to around 3,500 by the 1996–97 season, following upgrades including a 450 seater stand (later upgraded to 499 seats).

== Honours ==
1st team:

- North Midlands Cup winners (7): 1980–81, 1982–83, 1983–84, 1984–85, 1985–86, 1990–91, 1994–95
- National League 3 North champions: 2000–01

2nd team (Stourbridge Lions):

- North Midlands 3 champions: 2002–03
- North Midlands 2 champions: 2003–04
- North Midlands (South) 1 champions: 2004–05
- Midlands 4 West (South) champions: 2005–06
- Midlands 2 West (North) champions: 2016–17
