= Bournville RFC =

English rugby union club, based in Birmingham

Bournville
- Full name: Bournville Rugby Football Club
- Union: North Midlands RFU
- Founded: 1909; 117 years ago
- Location: Edgbaston, Birmingham, West Midlands, England
- Ground: Avery Fields
- Chairman: Club chair -Alex Bann, Vice chair -Chris Strange, Women's chair - Naomi Gardner
- President: Ivor Boehmer, George Foley
- Captain(s): James Weaver (Club Captain), Ben Meakin (First XV Captain), Heather Rodgers (Golds Captain -women's)
- League: Regional 1 Midlands
- 2025–26: 1st (promoted to National League 2 West); Blues (2nd XV) in Counties 2 Midlands West (East); Third XV in Midlands Reserve League Division 2 Women Firsts - NC1 Midlands; Women's second (maroons) - NC3 Midlands -->
Team kit

Official website
- www.bournvillerfc.co.uk

Bournville Rugby Football Club is an English rugby union team based in Birmingham. The club has recently moved to new facilities at Avery Fields, 79 Sandon Road, Edgbaston, Birmingham B17 8DT. The club operates three senior men's teams, two women's side, a veterans' team and a full range of junior teams. The first XV are the champions of Regional 1 Midlands – a league at tier 5 of the English rugby union system – and are promoted to National League 2 West. The women's team just last year, have been promoted to NC1 (captained by Ashleigh Aiston), and are now the biggest women's rugby team in Birmingham, with a second senior women's team.

== History ==
Bournville Rugby Club was formed in 1909 as the rugby section of Bournville Athletic Club. Recent years has seen the club make progress up the rugby union hierarchy after struggling during the early years of the English rugby union league system. Recent seasons has seen the club move from level ten to level four following elevation into the lowest level of national rugby in 2012 when they won promotion to National 3 Midlands via a promotion play-off, after a second-placed finish in Midlands 1 West.

== Current standings ==
2026–27 National League 2 West table
Pos	Team	Pld	W	D	L	PF	PA	PD	TB	LB	Pts	Qualification
1	Redruth	6	6	0	0	265	121	+144	5	0	29	Promotion place
2	Taunton Titans	6	5	0	1	264	132	+132	5	1	26	Promotion play-off
3	Hinckley	6	5	0	1	253	108	+145	5	0	25	
4	Luctonians	6	5	0	1	198	129	+69	5	0	25	
5	Clifton	6	5	0	1	240	189	+51	5	0	25	
6	Lymm	6	4	0	2	198	202	−4	5	1	22	
7	Old Redcliffians	6	3	0	3	194	188	+6	5	1	18	
8	Cinderford	6	3	0	3	222	250	−28	5	0	17	
9	Loughborough Students	6	2	0	4	197	236	−39	5	1	14	
10	Hornets	6	1	0	5	180	200	−20	4	4	12	
11	Barnstaple	6	2	0	4	139	174	−35	2	1	11	
12	Bournville	6	1	0	5	212	348	−136	5	1	10	Relegation play-off
13	Devonport Services	6	0	0	6	145	294	−149	3	1	4	Relegation place
14	Exeter University	6	0	0	6	140	276	−136	2	0	2	Relegation place

Updated to match(es) played on 5 September 2026. Source: National League Rugby
Rules for classification: If teams are level at any stage, tiebreakers are applied in the following order:
1. Number of matches won
2. Number of matches drawn
3. Difference between points for and against
4. Total number of points for
5. Aggregate number of points scored in matches between tied teams
6. Number of matches won excluding the first match, then the second and so on until the tie is settled

== Honours ==
- North Midlands 4 champions: 1991–92
- North Midlands Shield winners: 2008–09
- Midlands 1 (east v west) promotion play-off winners (2): 2011–12, 2016–17
- North Midlands Cup winners (2): 2012–13, 2016–17
- Midlands 5 West (North) champions: 2006–07
- Regional 1 Midlands champions: 2019–20, 2025–26

== Notable former players ==
- (Romania) Şerban Ghica
