= Midlands 5 West (North) =

English rugby union league

Counties 4 Midlands West (North)
- Current season or competition: 2024-25 Counties 4 Midlands West (North)
- Sport: Rugby union
- Instituted: 2005; 21 years ago (as Midlands 6 West (North))
- Ceased: 2019; 7 years ago
- Number of teams: 6
- Country: England
- Holders: Tenbury (3rd title) (2018–19) (promoted to Midlands 4 West (North))
- Most titles: Tenbury (3 titles)
- Website: England RFU

Counties 4 Midlands West (North)/(Central) (formerly Midlands 5 West (North)) was a level 10 English Rugby Union league and level 5 of the Midlands League, that was made up of teams from the northern part of the West Midlands region including clubs from parts of Birmingham and the West Midlands, Shropshire, Staffordshire, Worcestershire and even Cheshire, with home and away matches played throughout the season. Each year some of the clubs in this division took part in the RFU Junior Vase - a level 9-12 national competition.

The league was formed in 2005 and was originally known as Midlands 6 West (North) prior to the Midlands league restructure at the end of the 2008–09 season. Promoted teams typically moved up to Counties 3 Midlands West (North) and there was relegation due to it being one of the basement divisions for Midlands rugby. At the end of the 2018–19 season the league was discontinued, with the majority of teams transferred to Midlands 5 West (South). However, following the RFU's Adult Competition Review, from season 2022-23 the league was reinstated with the new name Counties 4 Midlands West (North).

== 2026-27 ==
Ahead of the new season the league was split out with the introduction of a new 'Central' division.

=== North ===
Departing were Whitchurch II(champions) and Bloxwich (runners-up), both promoted to Counties 3 Midlands West (North). There was no relegation.

Leaving on a level transfer to the newly formed Central division were Wednesbury, Burntwood II, Telford Hornets II and Essington.

Team	Ground	Capacity	City/Area	Previous season
Barton-under-Needwood II	Holland Sports Club		Barton-under-Needwood, Staffordshire	
Burton III	Battlestead Croft, Tatenhill	5,500 (600 seats	Burton upon Trent, Staffordshire	
Cannock	Morgan Ground		Huntington, Cannock Chase, Staffordshire	Relegated from Counties 3 Midlands West (North)
Congleton	Congleton Park		Congleton, Cheshire	Relegated from Counties 3 ADM Lancashire & Cheshire (11th)
Linley & Kidsgrove	Kidsgrove Cricket Club		Kidsgrove, Staffordshire	8th
Newcastle (Staffs) III	Lilleshall Road		Clayton, Newcastle-under-Lyme, Staffordshire	10th
Penkridge	Penkridge Sports & Recreation Centre		Penkridge, Staffordshire	Promoted from Staffordshire merit leagues
Shrewsbury II	Sundorne Castle		Uffington, Shrewsbury, Shropshire	
Stafford II	The County Ground		Stafford, Staffordshire	9th
Trentham II	New Inn Lane		Trentham, Stoke-on-Trent, Staffordshire	6th

Locations of the 2026-27 Counties 4 Midlands West (North) teams

=== Central ===
Team	Ground	Capacity	City/Area	Previous season
Burntwood II	The Sportsway		Burntwood, Staffordshire	4th
Essington	High Hill Centre		Essington, Staffordshire	7th
Moseley Oak II	Billesley Common	5,000 (1,300 seats)	Moseley, Birmingham, West Midlands	
Old Saltleians II	Watton Lane		Water Orton, Warwickshire	Level transfer from Counties 4 Midlands West (East)
Sutton Coldfield II	Roger Smoldon Ground		Sutton Coldfield, West Midlands	
Tamworth II	Wigginton Park		Tamworth, Staffordshire	Relegated from Counties 3 Midlands West (East) (12th)
Telford Hornets II	Hinkshay Road		Telford, Shropshire	5th
Wednesbury	Woden Road North		Wednesbury, West Midlands	3rd
Willenhall II	Bognop Road		Essington, Staffordshire	

Locations of the 2026-27 Counties 4 Midlands West (Central) teams

== 2025-26 ==
Departing were Newport (Salop) III (champions) and St Leonards (runners-up), both promoted to Counties 3 Midlands West (North). Warley (3rd) were promoted to Counties 3 Midlands West (South).

Aldridge re-entered the league having withdrawn from Counties 3 Midlands West (North) in season 2024–25 but subsequently withdrew part way through the season as did Stoke-on-Trent II (relegated from Counties 3 Midlands West (North)) leaving ten clubs to contest the outstanding fixtures.

Team	Ground	Capacity	City/Area	Previous season
Bloxwich	Stafford Road Sports Club		Bloxwich, Walsall, West Midlands	6th
Burntwood II	The Sportsway		Burntwood, Staffordshire	5th
Essington	High Hill Centre		Essington, Staffordshire	10th
Linley & Kidsgrove	Kidsgrove Cricket Club		Kidsgrove, Staffordshire	9th
Newcastle (Staffs) III	Lilleshall Road		Clayton, Newcastle-under-Lyme, Staffordshire	7th
Stafford II	The County Ground		Stafford, Staffordshire	New entry
Telford Hornets II	Hinkshay Road		Telford, Shropshire	8th
Trentham II	New Inn Lane		Trentham, Stoke-on-Trent, Staffordshire	New entry
Wednesbury	Woden Road North		Wednesbury, West Midlands	4th
Whitchurch II	Edgeley Park		Whitchurch, Shropshire	New entry

Locations of the 2025-26 Counties 4 Midlands West (North) teams

== 2024-25 ==
Departing were Burton III and Stoke-on-Trent II, both promoted to Counties 3 Midlands West (North). Atherstone were promoted to Counties 3 Midlands West (East).

Joining were Newport (Salop) III, Telford Hornets II and Warley.

Whittington (9th in 23–24) and Erdington (12th in 23–24) started the season but withdrew due to an inability to fulfil fixtures.

Team	Ground	Capacity	City/Area	Previous season
Bloxwich	Stafford Road Sports Club		Bloxwich, Walsall, West Midlands	4th
Burntwood II	The Sportsway		Burntwood, Staffordshire	7th
Essington	High Hill Centre		Essington, Staffordshire	6th
Linley & Kidsgrove	Kidsgrove Cricket Club		Kidsgrove, Staffordshire	11th
Newcastle (Staffs) III	Lilleshall Road		Clayton, Newcastle-under-Lyme, Staffordshire	10th
Newport (Salop) III	The Old Showground		Newport, Shropshire	New entry
St Leonards	Universal Sports and Social Club		Stafford, Staffordshire	8th
Telford Hornets II	Hinkshay Road		Telford, Shropshire	New entry
Warley	Tatbank Road		Oldbury, West Midlands	Level transfer from Counties 4 Midlands West (South) (4th)
Wednesbury	Woden Road North		Wednesbury, West Midlands	5th

Locations of the 2024-25 Counties 4 Midlands West (North) teams

== 2023-24 ==
Departing were Stone, promoted whilst Longton II (11th) returned to the Staffordshire merit leagues.

Joining were Whittington, Wednesbury and Burntwood II.

Team	Ground	Capacity	City/Area	Previous season
Atherstone	Atherstone Town Cricket Club		Atherstone, Warwickshire	6th
Bloxwich	Stafford Road Sports Club		Bloxwich, Walsall, West Midlands	3rd
Burton III	Battlestead Croft, Tatenhill		Burton, Staffordshire	7th
Burntwood II	The Sportsway		Burntwood, Staffordshire	New entry
Erdington	Spring Lane Playing Fields		Erdington, West Midlands	9th
Essington	High Hill Centre		Essington, Staffordshire	5th
Linley & Kidsgrove	Kidsgrove Cricket Club		Kidsgrove, Staffordshire	8th
Newcastle (Staffs) II	Lilleshall Road		Clayton, Newcastle-under-Lyme, Staffordshire	2nd
St Leonards	Universal Sports and Social Club		Stafford, Staffordshire	4th
Stoke-on-Trent	Hartwell Lane		Barlaston, Staffordshire	10th
Wednesbury	Woden Road North		Wednesbury, West Midlands	Relegated from Counties 3 Midlands West (North) (10th)
Whittington	Eastern Avenue		Lichfield, Staffordshire	Re-entry

Locations of the 2023-24 Counties 4 Midlands West (North) teams

== 2022-23 ==
This was the first season following the RFU Adult Competition Review with the league adopting its new name of Counties 4 Midlands West (North).

Team	Ground	Capacity	City/Area	Previous season
Atherstone	Atherstone Town Cricket Club		Atherstone, Warwickshire	Level transfer from Counties 4 Midlands West (South) (11th)
Bloxwich	Stafford Road Sports Club		Bloxwich, Walsall, West Midlands	Level transfer from Counties 4 Midlands West (South) (7th)
Burton III	Battlestead Croft, Tatenhill		Burton, Staffordshire	New entry
Erdington	Spring Lane Playing Fields		Erdington, West Midlands	Re-entry
Essington	High Hill Centre		Essington, Staffordshire	Relegated from Counties 3 Midlands West (North)
Linley & Kidsgrove	Kidsgrove Cricket Club		Kidsgrove, Staffordshire	Re-entry
Longton II	Trentham Fields		Longton, Stoke-on-Trent, Staffordshire	New entry
Newcastle (Staffs) II	Lilleshall Road		Clayton, Newcastle-under-Lyme, Staffordshire	New entry
St Leonards	Universal Sports and Social Club		Stafford, Staffordshire	Level transfer from Counties 4 Midlands West (South) (8th)
Stoke-on-Trent II	Hartwell Lane		Barlaston, Staffordshire	New entry
Stone	Stone Hockey Club		Aston By Stone, Staffordshire	Level transfer from Counties 4 Midlands West (South) (5th)

Locations of the 2022-23 Counties 4 Midlands West (North) teams

== 2019-2022 ==
Not contested

== 2018–19 ==
=== Participating teams & locations ===
Team	Ground	Capacity	City/Area	Previous season
Bishop's Castle & Onny Valley	Bishop's Castle Community College		Bishop's Castle, Shropshire	3rd
Chaddesley Corbett	Fox Lane		Chaddesley Corbett, Worcestershire	5th
Dixonians	Rowheath Park		Birmingham, West Midlands	Greater Birmingham Merit League (champions)
Stourport	Walshes Meadow		Stourport-on-Severn, Worcestershire	8th
Tenbury	Penlu		Tenbury Wells, Worcestershire	Relegated from Midlands 4 West (South) (11th)
Warley	Tatbank Road		Oldbury, West Midlands	6th

Locations of the 2018–19 Midlands 5 West (North) teams

== 2017–18 ==
=== Participating teams & locations ===
Team	Ground	Capacity	City/Area	Previous season
Bishop's Castle & Onny Valley	Bishop's Castle Community College		Bishop's Castle, Shropshire	Relegated from Midlands 4 West (North) (11th)
Chaddesley Corbett	Fox Lane		Chaddesley Corbett, Worcestershire	5th
Gnosall	Gnosall Family Sports Club		Gnosall, Staffordshire	Staffordshire Merit Leagues
Greyhound	Hereford City Sports Club		Hereford, Herefordshire	3rd
Linley & Kidsgrove	Kidsgrove Cricket Club		Kidsgrove, Staffordshire	Transferred from South Lancs/Cheshire 3 (14th)
St Leonards	Brian Westhead Pavilion		Stafford, Staffordshire	Relegated from Midlands 4 West (North) (12th)
Stourport	Walshes Meadow		Stourport-on-Severn, Worcestershire	6th
Warley	Tatbank Road		Oldbury, West Midlands	7th

Locations of the 2017–18 Midlands 5 West (North) teams

== Participating Clubs 2016-17 ==
- Acton Nomads
- Aldridge (relegated from Midlands 4 West (North))
- Chaddesley Corbett
- Greyhound
- Market Drayton (relegated from Midlands 4 West (North))
- Stourport
- Tenbury
- Warley

== Participating Clubs 2015-16 ==
- Chaddesley Corbett
- Essington
- Greyhound (relegated from Midlands 4 West (North))
- Tenbury (relegated from Midlands 4 West (North))
- St Leonards
- Stourport
- Warley

== Participating Clubs 2014-15 ==
- Aldridge
- Birmingham Barbarians
- Chaddesley Corbett
- Church Stretton
- Essington
- St Leonards
- Stourport
- Warley (relegated from Midlands 4 West (North))
- Whittington

== Participating Clubs 2013-14 ==
- Aldridge
- Birmingham Barbarians
- Chaddesley Corbett
- Essington
- Rugeley
- Stourport
- Telford Hornets
- Whittington

== Participating clubs 2012–13 ==
- Aldridge
- Birmingham Barbarians
- Essington
- Rugeley
- St Leonards
- Stourport
- Warley
- Whittington

== Participating clubs 2010–11 ==
- Aldridge
- Birmingham Civil Service
- Bromyard
- Five Ways Old Edwardians
- Hanford
- Old Griffinians
- Stourport
- Tenbury
- Wheaton Aston
- Whittington

== Original teams ==
When this division was introduced in 2005 as Midlands 6 West (North) it contained the following teams:

- Barton-under-Needwood - transferred from Staffordshire 2 (3rd)
- Eccleshall - transferred from Staffordshire 2 (8th)
- Gnosall - transferred from Staffordshire 2 (9th)
- Hanford - transferred from Staffordshire 2 (8th)
- Market Drayton - transferred from Staffordshire 2 (6th)
- Rugley - transferred from Staffordshire 2 (7th)
- St Leonards - transferred from Staffordshire 2 (runners up)
- Stone - transferred from Staffordshire 2 (4th)
- Wheaton Aston & Penkridge - transferred from Staffordshire 2 (11th)
- Whittington - transferred from Staffordshire 2 (5th)

== Midlands 5 West (North) honours ==
=== Midlands 6 West (North) (2005–2009) ===
Midlands 6 West (North) was introduced ahead of the 2005–06 season as a tier 10 league to replace the discontinued North Midlands (North) and Staffordshire 1 leagues. Promotion was to Midlands 5 West (North) and there was no relegation.

Midlands 6 West (North)
Season	No of Teams	Champions	Runners–up	Relegated Teams	Reference
2005–06	10	St Leonards	Rugley	No relegation	
2006–07	10	Handsworth	Eccleshall	No relegation	
2007–08	9	Barton-Under-Needwood	Yardley & District	No relegation	
2008–09	8	Essington	Rugeley	No relegation	
Green backgrounds are promotion places.

=== Midlands 5 West (North) (2009–2019) ===
Further league restructuring by the RFU meant that Midlands 6 West (North) and their counterparts Midlands 6 West (South-East / South-West) were renamed as Midlands 5 West North and Midlands 5 West (South-East) and Midlands 5 West (South-West), with all leagues remaining at tier 10. Promotion was now to Midlands 4 West (North) (formerly Midlands 5 West (North)) and there was no relegation. At the end of 2018–19 season Midlands 5 West (North) was cancelled.

Midlands 5 West (North)
Season	No of Teams	Champions	Runners–up	Relegated Teams	Reference
2009–10	8	Market Drayton	Warley	No relegation	
2010–11	8	Tenbury	Birmingham Civil Service	No relegation	
2011–12	9	Bromyard	Five Ways Old Edwardians	No relegation	
2012–13	8	St Leonards	Warley	No relegation	
2013–14	8	Rugeley	Telford Hornets	No relegation	
2014–15	9	Church Stretton	Aldridge	No relegation	
2015–16	7	Essington	St Leonards	No relegation	
2016–17	7	Tenbury	Market Drayton	No relegation	
2017–18	8	Greyhound	Linley	No relegation	
2018–19	6	Tenbury	Warley	No relegation	
Green backgrounds are promotion places.

== Number of league titles ==
- Tenbury (3)
- Essington (2)
- St Leonards (2)
- Barton-Under-Needwood (1)
- Bromyard (1)
- Church Stretton (1)
- Greyhound (1)
- Handsworth (1)
- Market Drayton (1)
- Rugeley (1)

== See also ==
- Midlands RFU
- North Midlands RFU
- Staffordshire RU
- English rugby union system
- Rugby union in England
