= 2017–18 RFU Junior Vase =

English rugby union competition

Tournament details
- Countries: England
- Tournament format(s): knockout
- Date: 2 September 2017 – 6 May 2018

Tournament statistics
- Teams: 134

Final
- Venue: Twickenham Stadium
- Champions: Old Otliensians (1st title)
- Runners-up: South Molton

The 2017–18 RFU Junior Vase is the 28th version of the RFU Junior Vase national cup competition (9th using the name RFU Junior Vase) for clubs at level 9 and below of the English rugby union system. The competition consists of 134 clubs divided into four regions. The winners of each region then advance to the national semi-finals with the final being held at Twickenham Stadium in London at the end of the season, along with the RFU Intermediate Cup and RFU Senior Vase finals.

The 2017–18 champions were Yorkshire club, Old Otliensians, who defeated the Devon side, South Molton, 31–21 in the final. Old Otliensians were worthy winners of the competition, scoring over 260 points on route to the final, whilst conceding only 15, a run which included a club record 126–0 over Wallsend in the early stages. Old Otliensians victory was the 11th by a Yorkshire club since the competition began in 1990.

== London & South East Junior Vase ==
The London & South East Junior Vase involves a knock-out competition with 1st round, 2nd round, 3rd round, 4th round, semi-finals and final. The winners of the London & South East Junior Vase then go on to the national Junior Vase semi-finals where they face the winners of the South West Junior Vase. There are 55 teams involved in the London & South East Junior Vase, all of which are 1st XV sides, coming from the following unions and leagues.

Union(s)	League(s) / Level	Participants
Eastern Counties	Eastern Counties 1 (9)	2
Essex	Essex 1 (9)	4
Hampshire	Hampshire 1 (9)	5
Hampshire	Hampshire 2 (10)	2
Hertfordshire	Herts/Middlesex 1 (9)	2
Hertfordshire	Herts/Middlesex 2 (10)	1
Kent	Kent 1 (9)	6
Kent	Kent 2 (10)	5
Kent	No league	1 (Note: A member of the Kent RFU (Old Suttonians) also took part in the competition despite not being involved in any leagues within the English rugby union system.)
Middlesex	Herts/Middlesex 1 (9)	2
Middlesex	Herts/Middlesex 2 (10)	2
Surrey	Surrey 1 (9)	6
Surrey	Surrey 2 (10)	4
Surrey	Surrey 3 (11)	3
Surrey	Surrey 4 (12)	3
Sussex	Sussex 1 (9)	4

=== Round 1 ===
Byes: Ashford (K1), Bognor (H1), Burgess Hill (SX1), Cranbrook (K1), Gillingham Anchorians (K1), Millbrook (H1), Royston (HM1), Sandown & Shanklin (H1), Uckfield (SX1)

Date	Home	Score	Away
14 October 2017	Bank of England (HM1)	45–53	Old Whitgiftian (SY1)
14 October 2017	Bec Old Boys (SY2)	26–24	Old Gravesendians (K1)
14 October 2017	Brockleians (K2)	HWO	Old Suttonians
14 October 2017	Chipstead (SY1)	HWO	Askeans (K2)
14 October 2017	Cranleigh (SY2)	HWO	Aldershot & Fleet (H2)
14 October 2017	Dagenham (E1)	HWO	Old Millhillians (HM2)
14 October 2017	Egham Hollowegians (SY4)	10–33	Alton (H2)
14 October 2017	Fareham Heathens (H1)	HWO	Worth Old Boys (SY3)
14 October 2017	Farnborough (H2)	HWO	Kingston (SY2)
14 October 2017	Harwich & Dovercourt (E1)	HWO	Beccles (EC1)
14 October 2017	Hellingly (SX1)	10–26	Old Mid-Whitgiftian (SY1)
14 October 2017	Ipswich Y.M. (EC1)	HWO	Stanford Le Hope (E1)
14 October 2017	Old Walcountians (SY1)	AWO	Seaford (SX1)
14 October 2017	Old Wimbledonians (SY1)	HWO	Southwark Lancers (K1)
14 October 2017	Purley John Fisher (SY3)	59–7	Greenwich (K2)
14 October 2017	Reigate (SY4)	HWO	Dartford Valley (K2)
14 October 2017	Sittingbourne (K1)	HWO	Old Blues (SY1)
14 October 2017	Southampton (H2)	26–81	Reeds Weybridge (SY2)
14 October 2017	Thamesians (HM2)	42–7	Barnet Elizabethans (HM1)
14 October 2017	Wasps FC (HM1)	HWO	Cuffley (HM2)
14 October 2017	Whitstable (K2)	38–17	Croydon (SY3)
14 October 2017	Woking (SY4)	80–5	Ventnor (H1)
14 October 2017	Writtle Wanderers (E1)	51–15	Thurston (EC1)

=== Round 2 ===
Date	Home	Score	Away
14 October 2017	Bec Old Boys (SY2)	HWO	Brockleians (K2)
14 October 2017	Bognor (H1)	HWO	Farnborough (H2)
14 October 2017	Cranbrook (K1)	HWO	Thamesians (HM2)
14 October 2017	Cranleigh (SY2)	20–11	Burgess Hill (SX1)
14 October 2017	Fareham Heathens (H1)	33–37	Chipstead (SY1)
14 October 2017	Harwich & Dovercourt (E1)	HWO	Dagenham (E1)
14 October 2017	Old Mid-Whitgiftian (SY1)	19–21	Ashford (K1)
14 October 2017	Old Whitgiftian (SY1)	30–8	Gillingham Anchorians (K1) (Note: Despite initially losing their second round game against Old Whitgiftian, Gillingham Anchorians were reinstated back into the London Junior Vase after Old Whitgiftian were later expelled for breaching competition rules.)
14 October 2017	Old Wimbledonians (SY1)	76–0	Sittingbourne (K1)
14 October 2017	Purley John Fisher (SY3	16–10	Uckfield (SX1)
14 October 2017	Reigate (SY4)	0–41	Millbrook (H1)
14 October 2017	Royston (HM1)	22–14	Ipswich Y.M. (EC1)
14 October 2017	Sandown & Shanklin (H1)	HWO	Woking (SY4)
14 October 2017	Seaford (SX1)	27–10	Alton (H2)
14 October 2017	Wasps FC (HM1)	12–18	Writtle Wanderers (E1)
14 October 2017	Whitstable (K2)	AWO	Reeds Weybridge (SY2)

=== Round 3 ===
Date	Home	Score	Away
2 December 2017	Bec Old Boys (SY2)	8–22	Ashford (K1)
2 December 2017	Bognor (H1)	31–27	Cranleigh (SY2)
2 December 2017	Chipstead (SY1)	29–5	Seaford (SX1)
2 December 2017	Harwich & Dovercourt (E1)	7–54	Royston (HM1)
2 December 2017	Millbrook (H1)	25–22	Purley John Fisher (SY3)
2 December 2017	Reeds Weybridge (SY2)	48–23	Cranbrook (K1)
2 December 2017	Sandown & Shanklin (H1)	12–34	Old Wimbledonians (SY1)
20 January 2018	Writtle Wanderers (E1)	10–26	Gillingham Anchorians (K1)

=== Round 4 ===
Date	Home	Score	Away
20 January 2018	Ashford (K1)	20–5	Royston (HM1)
20 January 2018	Chipstead (SY1)	18–10	Bognor (H1)
20 January 2018	Millbrook (H1)	15–17	Old Wimbledonians (SY1)
10 February 2018	Gillingham Anchorians (K1)	17–15	Reeds Weybridge (SY2)

=== Semi-finals ===
Date	Home	Score	Away
24 February 2018	Ashford (K1)	3–15	Chipstead (SY1)
24 February 2018	Old Wimbledonians (SY1)	29–17	Gillingham Anchorians (K1)

=== Final ===
The winners of the London & South East Junior Vase final would advance to the national semi-finals.

Date	Home	Score	Away
17 March 2018	Old Wimbledonians (SY1))	0–27	Chipstead (SY1)

== Midlands Junior Vase ==
The Midlands Junior Vase is a direct knockout cup with a 1st round, 2nd round, 3rd round, quarter-finals, semi-finals and final The winner of the final goes forward to the National Vase semi-finals where they face the winners of the Northern section. The competition involves 50 clubs from the following unions and level 9-10 leagues:

Union(s)	League(s) / Level	Participants
East Midlands	Midlands 4 East (South) (9)	5
Leicestershire	Midlands 4 West (South) (9)	1
North Midlands	Midlands 4 West (North) (9)	4
North Midlands	Midlands 4 West (South) (9)	3
North Midlands	Midlands 5 West (North) (10)	5
North Midlands	Midlands 5 West (South) (10)	1
North Midlands	No league	1 (Note: A member of the North Midlands RFU (Five Ways Old Edwardians) also took part in the competition despite not being involved in any official league within the English rugby union system.)
Notts, Lincs & Derbyshire	Midlands 4 East (North) (9)	9
Notts, Lincs & Derbyshire	Midlands 4 East (South) (9)	2
Notts, Lincs & Derbyshire	Midlands 5 East (North) (10)	6
Staffordshire	Midlands 4 West (North) (9)	4
Staffordshire	Midlands 5 West (North) (10)	3
Warwickshire	Midlands 4 West (South) (9)	3
Warwickshire	Midlands 5 West (South) (10)	3

=== Round 1 ===
Byes: Amber Valley (M5EN), Ashfield (M4EN), Aston Old Edwardians (M4WN), Bedford Swifts (M4ES), Bloxwich (M4WN), Brackley (M4ES), Burbage (M4WS), Harbury (M4WS), Keresley (M5WS), Mansfield Woodhouse (M5EN), Mellish (M4EN), St Leonards (M5WN), St Neots (M4ES), Tupton (M4EN)

Date	Home	Score	Away
16 September 2017	Atherstone (M5WS)	81–0	Gnosall (M5WN)
16 September 2017	Bourne (M4ES)	28–0	Skegness (M4EN)
16 September 2017	Chaddesley Corbett (M5WN)	22–21	Aldridge (M5WS)
16 September 2017	Church Stretton (M4WN)	HWO	Stourport (M5WN)
16 September 2017	Claverdon (M4WS)	7–16	Yardley & District (M4WN)
16 September 2017	Deepings (M4ES)	HWO	Bingham (M5EN)
16 September 2017	East Retford (M4EN)	55–8	Stamford College Old Boys (M4ES)
16 September 2017	Five Ways Old Edwardians	0–39	Stoke Old Boys (M4WS)
16 September 2017	Linley & Kidsgrove (M5WN)	11–12	Eccleshall (M4WN)
16 September 2017	Market Drayton (M4WN)	HWO	Bishop's Castle & Onny Valley (M5WN)
16 September 2017	Nottinghamians (M5EN)	17–22	Chesterfield Panthers (M4EN)
16 September 2017	Ollerton (M4EN)	AWO	Gainsborough (M5ENN)
16 September 2017	Pershore (M4WS)	84–19	Greyhound (M5WN)
16 September 2017	Redditch (M4WS)	0–19	Wednesbury (M4WN)
16 September 2017	Rugeley (M4WN)	HWO	Birmingham Civil Service (M4WS)
16 September 2017	Thorney (M4ES)	31–24	Boston (M4EN)
16 September 2017	Trinity Guild (M5WS)	HWO	Warley (M5WN)
16 September 2017	Worksop (M4EN)	12–36	North Hykeham (M5EN)

=== Round 2 ===
Date	Home	Score	Away
7 October 2017	Amber Valley (M5EN)	15–36	East Retford (M4EN)
7 October 2017	Brackley (M4ES)	HWO	Aston Old Edwardians (M4WN)
7 October 2017	Burbage (M4WS)	10–65	Ashfield (M4EN)
7 October 2017	Chesterfield Panthers (M4EN)	HWO	Mansfield Woodhouse (M5EN)
7 October 2017	Church Stretton (M4WN)	HWO	Chaddesley Corbett (M5WN)
7 October 2017	Eccleshall (M4WN)	HWO	Atherstone (M5WS)
7 October 2017	Gainsborough (M5ENN)	10–30	Bourne (M4ES)
7 October 2017	Keresley (M5WS)	17–35	Bedford Swifts (M4ES)
7 October 2017	Mellish (M4EN)	24–19	Deepings (M4ES)
7 October 2017	North Hykeham (M5EN)	22–10	Thorney (M4ES)
7 October 2017	St Leonards (M5WN)	15–8	Market Drayton (M4WN)
7 October 2017	St Neots (M4ES)	16–18	Harbury (M4WS)
7 October 2017	Stoke Old Boys (M4WS)	66–26	Rugeley (M4WN)
7 October 2017	Trinity Guild (M5WS)	22–66	Bloxwich (M4WN)
7 October 2017	Wednesbury (M4WN)	22–17	Pershore (M4WS)
7 October 2017	Yardley & District (M4WN)	HWO	Tupton (M4EN)

=== Round 3 ===
Date	Home	Score	Away
28 October 2017	Ashfield (M4EN)	11–6	Wednesbury (M4WN)
28 October 2017	Bedford Swifts (M4ES)	8–12	Harbury (M4WS)
28 October 2017	Bloxwich (M4WN)	22–5	East Retford (M4EN)
28 October 2017	Bourne (M4ES)	38–12	Chesterfield Panthers (M4EN)
28 October 2017	Church Stretton (M4WN)	HWO	St Leonards (M5WN)
28 October 2017	Eccleshall (M4WN)	19–17	Stoke Old Boys (M4WS)
28 October 2017	North Hykeham (M5EN)	40–14	Mellish (M4EN)
28 October 2017	Yardley & District (M4WN)	29–27	Brackley (M4ES)

=== Quarter-finals ===
Date	Home	Score	Away
18 November 2017	Ashfield (M4EN)	27–36	Eccleshall (M4WN)
18 November 2017	Bloxwich (M4WN)	34–41	Bourne (M4ES)
18 November 2017	Harbury (M4WS)	15–12	Church Stretton (M4WN)
18 November 2017	Yardley & District (M4WN)	12–35	North Hykeham (M5EN)

=== Semi-finals ===
Date	Home	Score	Away
20 January 2018	Eccleshall (M4WN)	HWO	Harbury (M4WS)
20 January 2018	North Hykeham (M5EN)	15–18	Bourne (M4ES)

=== Final ===
The winners of the Midlands Junior Vase would advance to the National Junior Vase semi-finals.

Date	Home	Score	Away
17 March 2018	Bourne (M4ES)	13–27	Eccleshall (M4WN)

== Northern Junior Vase ==
Unlike the other regional competitions, the Northern Junior Vase starts with a mini-league stage, in which the eligible clubs are placed in 2 regional pools of 3 teams each. The winners of each pool then face each other in the Northern Vase final, with the winner advancing to the National Junior Vase semi-finals, where they will face the winners of the Midlands section. There are 6 teams (1st XV only) involved in the Northern Junior Vase representing the following unions and leagues:

Union(s)	League(s) / Level	Participants
Durham County	Durham/Northumberland 3 (9)	1
Cheshire	Lancs/Cheshire Division 3 (9)	2 (Note: The breakaway of 19 Lancashire RFU clubs at the start of the 2017–18 season meant that no clubs from this union were involved in the RFU Junior Vase that year.)
Cumbria	No league (Note: A member of the Cumbria (Creighton) also took part in the competition despite being outside of the official English rugby union system (they were in the Cumbria Shield League).)	1
Northumberland	Durham/Northumberland 3 (9)	1
Yorkshire	Yorkshire 3 (9)	1

=== Pool 1 (West) ===
Pool 1
	Club	Played	Won	Drawn	Lost	Points For	Points Against	Points Difference	Points
1	Ramsey (LC3)	2	2	0	0	83	8	75	4
2	Creighton	2	1	0	1	37	81	-44	2
3	Liverpool University (LC3)	2	0	0	2	20	51	-31	0
2 points for a win, 1 point for a draw.

Date	Home	Score	Away
14 October 2017	Liverpool University (LC3)	15–34	Creighton
18 November 2017	Ramsey (LC3)	17–5	Liverpool University (LC3)
10 February 2018	Creighton (LC3)	3–66	Ramsey (LC3)

=== Pool 2 (East) ===
Pool 2
	Club	Played	Won	Drawn	Lost	Points For	Points Against	Points Difference	Points
1	Old Otliensians (Y3)	2	2	0	0	198	0	198	4
2	Wallsend (DN3)	2	1	0	1	49	147	-98	2
3	West Hartlepool T.D.S.O.B. (DN3)	2	0	0	2	21	121	-100	0
2 points for a win, 1 point for a draw.

Date	Home	Score	Away
14 October 2017	Old Otliensians (Y3)	126–0	Wallsend (DN3)
18 November 2017	Wallsend (DN3)	49–21	West Hartlepool T.D.S.O.B. (DN3)
10 February 2018	West Hartlepool T.D.S.O.B. (DN3)	0–72	Old Otliensians (Y3)

=== Final ===
The winners of the Pool 1 (West) and Pool 2 (East) would meet in the Northern Junior Vase final. The winners of this final would then advanced to the National Junior Vase semi-finals.

Date	Home	Score	Away
17 March 2018	Old Otliensians (Y3)	37–3	Ramsey (IoM) (LC3)

== South West Junior Vase ==
The South West Junior Vase consist of three stages, with representatives from the different unions joining at different points. The Dorset & Wilts and Gloucestershire clubs first play in county based knock-out tournaments, with the winners advancing to either the Southern Counties or South West Counties area semi-finals, where they join the other south-west representatives. The winners of each area final then meet in the South West Junior Vase final to determine who goes through to the national semi-finals, where they face the winners of the London and South East section.

The South West Junior Vase involves 23 clubs (1st XV only) from the following unions and leagues: (Note: Note that a representative from the Cornwall RFU is not taking part in the Junior Vase this season due to Cornwall League 1 and Cornwall League 2 amalgamating into one league and containing both level 9 and level 10 clubs.)

Union(s)	League(s) / Level	Participants
Berkshire	Berks/Bucks & Oxon Championship (9)	1
Buckinghamshire	Berks/Bucks & Oxon Championship (9)	1
Devon	Devon League 1 (10)	1
Dorset & Wilts	Dorset & Wilts 2 South (9)	4
Dorset & Wilts	Dorset & Wilts 2 North (9)	4
Dorset & Wilts	Dorset & Wilts 3 South (10)	1
Dorset & Wilts	No league	1 (Note: The Dorset & Wilts representatives also include a 1st XV club (Amesbury) not currently involved in any league within the English rugby union system.)
Gloucestershire	Gloucester 1 (9)	8
Oxfordshire	Berks/Bucks & Oxon Championship (9)	1
Somerset	Somerset 1 (9)	1

=== Stage 1 (Dorset & Wilts) ===
10 teams were involved in the Dorset & Wilts RFU Junior Vase qualification. The winners would advanced to the Southern Counties semi-finals.

First Round
Date	Home	Score	Away
23 September 2017	Amesbury	36–19	Colerne Calne (DW2N)
23 September 2017	Poole (DW3S)	7–63	Puddletown (DW2S)
Quarter-finals
14 October 2017	Amesbury	HWO	Colerne (DW2N)
14 October 2017	East Dorset (DW2S)	25–3	Wheatsheaf Cabin Crew (DW2S)
14 October 2017	Puddletown (DW2S)	25–18	Dinton (DW2S)
14 October 2017	Westbury (DW2N)	HWO	Cricklade (DW2N)
Semi-finals
18 November 2017	Amesbury	HWO	Westbury (DW2N)
18 November 2017	Puddletown (DW2S)	34–5	East Dorset (DW2S)
Final
2 December 2017	Puddletown (DW2S)	32–31	Amesbury

=== Stage 1 (Gloucestershire) ===
8 teams were involved in the Gloucestershire RFU Junior Vase qualification tournament. The winners of the competition would go through to the South West Counties final.

First Round
Date	Home	Score	Away
2 September 2017	Berry Hill (G1)	28–30	Widden Old Boys (G1)
2 September 2017	Cheltenham North (G1)	16–37	Brockworth (G1)
2 September 2017	North Bristol (G1)	22–26	Old Colstonians (G1)
2 September 2017	Southmead (G1)	10–67	Old Cryptians (G1)
Semi-finals
16 September 2017	Widden Old Boys (G1)	37–23	Old Cryptians (G1)
23 September 2017	Old Colstonians (G1)	27–24	Brockworth (G1)
Final
14 October 2017	Old Colstonians (G1)	31–5	Widden Old Boys (G1)

=== Stage 2 (Southern Counties) ===
The winners of the Dorset & Wilts Junior Vase would join representatives from the Berkshire, Buckinghamshire and Oxfordshire unions in the Southern Counties knock-out stage. The winners would advance to play the South West Counties winners in the south-west regional final.

Semi-finals
Date	Home	Score	Away
10 February 2018	Aldermaston (BBOC)	5–29	Puddletown (DW2S)
10 February 2018	Oxford (BBOC)	31–15	Risborough (BBOC)
Final
24 February 2018	Puddletown (DW2S)	13–36	Oxford (BBOC)

=== Stage 2 (South West Counties) ===
The winners of the Gloucestershire Junior Vase would meet the representatives from the Somerset RFU in the semi-final, while the representatives from Devon RFU had a bye into the South West Counties final due to Cornish clubs not taking part this season. The winners would advance to play the Southern Counties winners in the south-west regional final.

Semi-finals
Date	Home	Score	Away
10 February 2018	Old Colstonians (G1)	46–7	Bristol Barbarians (S1)
Final
24 February 2018	South Molton (D1) (Note: South Molton received a bye through to the South West Counties final as Cornish teams were not included in this year's competition.)	24–10	Old Colstonians (G1) (Note: The RFU website incorrectly lists Oxford as South Molton's opposition (they would meet Oxford next in the south-west final).)

=== Stage 3 (South West final) ===
The winners of the Southern Counties and South West Counties final would meet in the south-west regional final. The winners of this final would then advanced to the national semi-finals.

Date	Home	Score	Away
17 March 2018	Oxford (BBOC)	13–13 (Note: South Molton progressed to the national semi-finals by virtue of scoring more tries - 2 to 1 - than Oxford.)	South Molton (D1)

== National Junior Vase ==
4 teams qualified from the regional vase competitions:

- London & South East Junior Vase – Chipstead (SY1)
- Midlands Junior Vase – Eccleshall (M4WN)
- Northern Junior Vase – Old Otliensians (Y3)
- South West Junior Vase – South Molton (D1)

The Midlands winners would face the North winners in the first semi-final, while the London & South East winners would face the South-West winners in the other, with the winners of each semi-final meeting in the Twickenham final. Home advantage in the semi-finals will be decided by a draw.

=== Semi-finals ===
Date	Home	Score	Away
31 March 2018	Old Otliensians (Y3)	28–12	Eccleshall (M4WN)
31 March 2018	South Molton (D1)	12–10	Chipstead (SY1)

=== Final ===
6 May 2018
11:00

Old Otliensians (Y3)	32–21	South Molton (D1)
	Report

Twickenham Stadium, London
Referee: Callum Sharp

== See also ==
- 2017–18 Anglo-Welsh Cup
- 2017–18 British and Irish Cup
- 2017–18 RFU Intermediate Cup
- 2017–18 RFU Senior Vase
- English rugby union system
- List of English rugby union teams
- Rugby union in England
