= Midlands 4 West (North) =

Level 9 English Rugby Union league

Counties 3 Midlands West (North)
- Current season or competition: 2024-25 Counties 3 Midlands West (North)
- Sport: Rugby union
- Instituted: 2005; 21 years ago (as Midlands 5 West (North))
- Number of teams: 12
- Country: England
- Most titles: Eccleshall, Harborne (2 titles)
- Website: England RFU

Counties 3 Midlands West (North) (formerly Midlands 4 West (North)) is a level 9 English Rugby Union league and level 4 of the Midlands League, made up of teams from the northern part of the West Midlands region including Shropshire, parts of Birmingham and the West Midlands and occasionally Cheshire, with home and away matches played throughout the season. Each year some of the clubs in this division also take part in the RFU Junior Vase - a level 9-12 national competition.

Formed for the 2005-06 season, the division was originally known as Midlands 5 West (North) but changed to its present name for the 2008–09 season due to league restructuring. Further restructuring followed in the wake of the RFU's Adult Competition Review and from season 2022-23 it has been known by its current name.

Promoted teams move up to Counties 2 Midlands West (North) while relegated teams drop to Counties 4 Midlands West (North).

== 2026-27 ==
Departing were Barton-under-Needwood promoted to Counties 2 Midlands West (West) while Cannock (11th) and Burton III (12th) were relegated to Counties 4 Midlands West (North).

Also departing were Lichfield II (3rd) who moved on a level transfer back to Counties 3 Midlands West (East).

Team	Ground	Capacity	City/Area	Previous season
Bloxwich	Stafford Road Sports Club		Bloxwich, Walsall, West Midlands	Promoted from Counties 4 Midlands West (North) (runners up)
Eccleshall	Baden Hall		Eccleshall, Staffordshire	2nd
Longton	Trentham Fields		Longton, Stoke-on-Trent, Staffordshire	Relegated from Counties 2 Midlands West (West) (11th)
Market Drayton	Greenfields Lane		Market Drayton, Shropshire	8th
Newcastle (Staffs) II	Lilleshall Road		Clayton, Newcastle-under-Lyme, Staffordshire	Relegated from Counties 2 Midlands West (West) (12th)
Newport (Salop) III	The Old Showground		Newport, Shropshire	7th
Oswestry	Granville Park		Oswestry, Shropshire	6th
Rugeley	St Augustine's Field		Rugeley, Staffordshire	9th
St Leonards	Universal Sports and Social Club		Stafford, Staffordshire	10th
Stone	Stone Hockey Club		Aston By Stone, Staffordshire	5th
Uttoxeter	Oldfields Sports & Social Club	2,000	Uttoxeter, Staffordshire	4th
Whitchurch II	Edgeley Park		Whitchurch, Shropshire	Promoted from Counties 4 Midlands West (North) (champions)

Locations of the 2026-27 Counties 3 Midlands West (North) teams

== 2025-26 ==
Departing were Leek II and Newcastle (Staffs) II, promoted to Counties 2 Midlands West (West). Stoke-on-Trent II (11th) were relegated to Counties 4 Midlands West (North).

Handsworth (6th) left on a level transfer to Counties 3 Midlands West (East).

Team	Ground	Capacity	City/Area	Previous season
Barton-under-Needwood	Holland Sports Club		Barton-under-Needwood, Staffordshire	3rd
Burton III	Battlestead Croft, Tatenhill		Burton, Staffordshire	10th
Cannock	Morgan Ground		Huntington, Cannock Chase, Staffordshire	7th
Eccleshall	Baden Hall		Eccleshall, Staffordshire	5th
Lichfield II	Cooke Fields		Lichfield, Staffordshire	Level transfer from Counties 3 Midlands West (East) (4th)
Market Drayton	Greenfields Lane		Market Drayton, Shropshire	Relegated from Counties 2 Midlands West (West) (11th)
Newport (Salop) III	The Old Showground		Newport, Shropshire	Promoted from Counties 4 Midlands West (North) (champions)
Oswestry	Granville Park		Oswestry, Shropshire	Relegated from Counties 2 Midlands West (West) (10th)
Rugeley	St Augustine's Field		Rugeley, Staffordshire	9th
St Leonards	Universal Sports and Social Club		Stafford, Staffordshire	Promoted from Counties 4 Midlands West (North) (runners-up)
Stone	Stone Hockey Club		Aston By Stone, Staffordshire	8th
Uttoxeter	Oldfields Sports & Social Club	2,000	Uttoxeter, Staffordshire	4th

Locations of the 2025-26 Counties 3 Midlands West (North) teams

== 2024-25 ==
Departing were Aston Old Edwardians and Trentham, promoted to Counties 2 Midlands West (East) and Counties 2 Midlands West (West) respectively. Cleobury Mortimer (6th) went on a level transfer to Counties 3 Midlands West (South). Shrewsbury II (11th) and Ludlow II (12th) were relegated into the Shropshire merit leagues.

Joining were Burton III, Handsworth, Rugeley, Stoke-on-Trent II and Uttoxeter.

Aldridge (10th in 2023-24) started but did not complete the season leaving eleven sides to contest the remaining fixtures.

Team	Ground	Capacity	City/Area	Previous season
Barton-under-Needwood	Holland Sports Club		Barton-under-Needwood, Staffordshire	4th
Burton III	Battlestead Croft, Tatenhill		Burton, Staffordshire	Promoted from Counties 4 Midlands West (North)
Cannock	Morgan Ground		Huntington, Cannock Chase, Staffordshire	8th
Eccleshall	Baden Hall		Eccleshall, Staffordshire	7th
Handsworth	Charles Lewis Memorial Ground		Walsall, West Midlands	Relegated from Counties 2 Midlands West (West)
Leek II	Altrad Park		Cheddleton, Staffordshire	3rd
Newcastle (Staffs) II	Lilleshall Road		Clayton, Newcastle-under-Lyme, Staffordshire	5th
Rugeley	St Augustine's Field		Rugeley, Staffordshire	Relegated from Counties 2 Midlands West (West)
Stoke-on-Trent II	Hartwell Lane		Barlaston, Staffordshire	Promoted from Counties 4 Midlands West (North) (3rd)
Stone	Stone Hockey Club		Aston By Stone, Staffordshire	9th
Uttoxeter	Oldfields Sports & Social Club	2,000	Uttoxeter, Staffordshire	Relegated from Counties 2 Midlands West (East)

Locations of the 2024-25 Counties 3 Midlands West (North) teams

== 2023-24 ==
Departing were Willenhall and Rugeley, both promoted to Counties 2 Midlands West (West). Wednesbury (9th) and Warley (10th) were relegated to Counties 4 Midlands West (North) and Counties 4 Midlands West (South) respectively.

Joining were Aldridge, Cleobury Mortimer, Stone, Leek II, Shrewsbury II and Newcastle (Staffs) II.

Team	Ground	Capacity	City/Area	Previous season
Aldridge	Bourne Vale		Aldridge, West Midlands	Relegated from Counties 2 Midlands West (North) (12th)
Aston Old Edwardians	ASunnybank Avenue		Kingstanding, Birmingham, West Midlands	5th
Barton-under-Needwood	Holland Sports Club		Barton-under-Needwood, Staffordshire	4th
Cannock	Morgan Ground		Huntington, Cannock Chase, Staffordshire	7th
Cleobury Mortimer	Love Lane		Cleobury Mortimer, Shropshire	Relegated from Counties 2 Midlands West (North) (11th)
Eccleshall	Baden Hall		Eccleshall, Staffordshire	6th
Leek II	Altrad Park		Cheddleton, Staffordshire	New entry
Ludlow II	The Linney		Ludlow, Shropshire	8th
Newcastle (Staffs) II	Lilleshall Road		Clayton, Newcastle-under-Lyme, Staffordshire	New entry
Shrewsbury II	Sundorne Castle		Uffington, Shrewsbury, Shropshire	New entry
Stone	Stone Hockey Club		Aston By Stone, Staffordshire	Promoted from Counties 4 Midlands West (North)
Trentham	New Inn Lane		Trentham, Stoke-on-Trent, Staffordshire	3rd

Locations of the 2023-24 Counties 3 Midlands West (North) teams

== 2022-23 ==
Departing were Oswestry and Market Drayton, both promoted to Counties 2 Midlands West (North). Birmingham Exiles (10th) departed on a level transfer to Counties 3 Midlands West (South). Essington (12th) were relegated to Counties 4 Midlands West (North). Yardley & District (8th) did not return for the new season.

Joining were Cannock, Eccleshall, Ludlow II

Team	Ground	Capacity	City/Area	Previous season
Aston Old Edwardians	ASunnybank Avenue		Kingstanding, Birmingham, West Midlands	7th
Barton-under-Needwood	Holland Sports Club		Barton-under-Needwood, Staffordshire	3rd
Cannock	Morgan Ground		Huntington, Cannock Chase, Staffordshire	Promoted from Midlands 5 West (South) (runners-up)
Eccleshall	Baden Hall		Eccleshall, Staffordshire	Relegated from Midlands 3 West (North) (11th)
Ludlow II	The Linney		Ludlow, Shropshire	New entry
Rugeley	St Augustine's Field		Rugeley, Staffordshire	6th
Trentham	New Inn Lane		Trentham, Stoke-on-Trent, Staffordshire	5th
Warley	Tatbank Road		Oldbury, West Midlands	11th
Wednesbury	Woden Road North		Wednesbury, West Midlands	9th
Willenhall	Bognop Road		Essington, Staffordshire	4th

Locations of the 2022-23 Counties 3 Midlands West (North) teams

== 2021–22 ==
=== Participating teams & locations ===
Cannock who finished 12th in 2019-20 were relegated to Midlands 5 West (South) with their place taken by Oswestry who were level transferred from Lancs/Cheshire 2 which was disbanded before the start of the 2021-22 season.

Team	Ground	Capacity	City/Area	Previous season
Aston Old Edwardians	ASunnybank Avenue		Kingstanding, Birmingham, West Midlands	7th
Barton-under-Needwood	Holland Sports Club		Barton-under-Needwood, Staffordshire	3rd
Birmingham Exiles	Old Damson Lane		Elmdon, West Midlands	10th
Essington	High Hill Centre		Essington, Staffordshire	8th
Market Drayton	Greenfields Lane		Market Drayton, Shropshire	4th
Oswestry	Granville Park		Oswestry, Shropshire	Level transfer from Lancs/Cheshire 2 (3rd)
Rugeley	St Augustine's Field		Rugeley, Staffordshire	5th
Trentham	New Inn Lane		Trentham, Stoke-on-Trent, Staffordshire	6th
Warley	Tatbank Road		Oldbury, West Midlands	11th
Wednesbury	Woden Road North		Wednesbury, West Midlands	Relegated from Midlands 3 WN (11th)
Willenhall	Bognop Road		Essington, Staffordshire	Relegated from Midlands 3 WN (12th)
Yardley & District	Cole Hall Lane		Stechford, Birmingham, West Midlands	9th

Locations of the 2021–22 Midlands 4 West (North) teams in Staffordshire and the West Midlands
Locations of the 2021–22 Midlands 4 West (North) teams in Shropshire

== 2020–21 ==
Due to the COVID-19 pandemic, the 2020–21 season was cancelled.

== 2019–20 ==
=== Participating teams & locations ===
Team	Ground	Capacity	City/Area	Previous season
Aldridge	Bourne Vale		Aldridge, West Midlands	6th
Aston Old Edwardians	Sunnybank Avenue		Kingstanding, Birmingham, West Midlands	5th
Barton-under-Needwood	Holland Sports Club		Barton-under-Needwood, Staffordshire	7th
Birmingham Exiles	Old Damson Lane		Elmdon, West Midlands	Promoted from Midlands 5 WS (champions)
Cannock	Morgan Ground		Huntington, Cannock Chase, Staffordshire	Relegated from Midlands 3 WN (12th)
Clee Hill	Tenbury Road		Cleehill, Shropshire	4th
Essington	High Hill Centre		Essington, Staffordshire	10th
Market Drayton	Greenfields Lane		Market Drayton, Shropshire	9th
Rugeley	St Augustine's Field		Rugeley, Staffordshire	3rd
Trentham	New Inn Lane		Trentham, Stoke-on-Trent, Staffordshire	Relegated from Midlands 3 WN (11th)
Warley	Tatbank Road		Oldbury, West Midlands	Promoted from Midlands 5 WN (runners up)
Yardley & District	Cole Hall Lane		Stechford, Birmingham, West Midlands	8th

Locations of the 2019–20 Midlands 4 West (North) teams in Staffordshire and the West Midlands
Locations of the 2019–20 Midlands 4 West (North) teams in Shropshire

== 2018–19 ==
=== Participating teams & locations ===
Team	Ground	Capacity	City/Area	Previous season
Aldridge	Bourne Vale		Aldridge, West Midlands	Promoted from Midlands 5 West (South) (champions)
Aston Old Edwardians	Sunnybank Avenue		Kingstanding, Birmingham, West Midlands	6th
Barton-under-Needwood	Holland Sports Club		Barton-under-Needwood, Staffordshire	Relegated from Midlands 3 West (North) (12th)
Bloxwich	Stafford Road Sports Club		Bloxwich, Walsall, West Midlands	8th
Clee Hill	Tenbury Road		Cleehill, Shropshire	4th
Essington	High Hill Centre		Essington, Staffordshire	9th (not relegated)
Linley & Kidsgrove	Kidsgrove Cricket Club		Kidsgrove, Staffordshire	Promoted from Midlands 5 West (North) (runners up)
Market Drayton	Greenfields Lane		Market Drayton, Shropshire	5th
Rugeley	St Augustine's Field		Rugeley, Staffordshire	3rd
Willenhall	Bognop Road		Essington, Staffordshire	Relegated from Midlands 3 West (North) (11th)
Yardley & District	Cole Hall Lane		Stechford, Birmingham, West Midlands	7th

Locations of the 2018-19 Midlands 4 West (North) teams in Staffordshire and the West Midlands
Locations of the 2018-19 Midlands 4 West (North) teams in Shropshire

== 2017–18 ==
=== Participating teams & locations ===
Team	Ground	Capacity	City/Area	Previous season
Aston Old Edwardians	Sunnybank Avenue		Kingstanding, Birmingham, West Midlands	9th
Bloxwich	Stafford Road Sports Club		Bloxwich, Walsall, West Midlands	4th
Church Stretton	Church Stretton School		Church Stretton, Shropshire	8th
Clee Hill	Tenbury Road		Cleehill, Shropshire	Relegated from Midlands 3 West (North) (11th)
Eccleshall	Baden Hall		Eccleshall, Staffordshire	Relegated from Midlands 3 West (North) (12th)
Essington	High Hill Centre		Essington, Staffordshire	7th
Market Drayton	Greenfields Lane		Market Drayton, Shropshire	Promoted from Midlands 5 West (North) (runners up)
Rugeley	St Augustine's Field		Rugeley, Staffordshire	3rd
Wednesbury	Woden Road North		Wednesbury, West Midlands	6th
Yardley & District	Cole Hall Lane		Stechford, Birmingham, West Midlands	10th

Locations of the 2017–18 Midlands 4 West (North) teams

== Teams 2016-17 ==
- Aston Old Edwardians
- Barton-Under-Needwood
- Bishops Castle & Onny Valley
- Bloxwich (relegated from Midlands 3 West (North))
- Church Stretton
- Essington (promoted from Midlands 5 West (North))
- Five Way Old Edwardians
- Rugeley
- St Leonards (promoted from Midlands 5 West (North))
- Trentham
- Wednesbury (relegated from Midlands 3 West (North))
- Yardley & District

== Teams 2015-16 ==
- Aldridge (promoted from Midlands 5 West (North))
- Aston Old Edwardians (relegated from Midlands 3 West (North))
- Barton-Under-Needwood
- Bishops Castle & Onny Valley
- Bromyard
- Church Stretton (promoted from Midlands 5 West (North))
- Market Drayton
- Rugeley
- Telford Hornets
- Uttoxeter (relegated from Midlands 3 West (North))
- Yardley & District

== Teams 2014-15 ==
- Barton-Under-Needwood (transferred from Midlands 4 West (South))
- Bishops Castle & Onny Valley
- Bromyard
- Cannock
- Cleobury Mortimer
- Greyhound
- Market Drayton (relegated from Midlands 3 West (North))
- Rugeley (promoted from Midlands 5 West (North))
- Telford Hornets (promoted from Midlands 5 West (North))
- Tenbury
- Yardley & District (relegated from Midlands 3 West (North))

== Teams 2013-14 ==
- Bishops Castle & Onny Valley
- Bromyard
- Cannock
- Clee Hill
- Cleobury Mortimer (relegated from Midlands 3 West (North))
- Five Ways Old Edwardians
- Greyhound
- Harborne
- St Leonards (promoted from Midlands 5 West (North))
- Tenbury
- Warley (promoted from Midlands 5 West (North))

== Teams 2012–13 ==
- Barton-Under-Needwood
- Bishops Castle & Onny Valley
- Bromyard
- Cannock
- Clee Hill
- Five Ways O.E.
- Harborne
- Market Drayton
- Telford Hornets
- Tenbury
- Uttoxeter

== Teams 2008–09 ==
- Bishops Castle & Onny Valley
- Burntwood
- Cleobury Mortimer
- Handsworth
- Leek
- Moseley Oak
- Newcastle
- Old Yardleians
- Shrewsbury
- Tamworth
- Veseyans
- Willenhall

== Teams 2007–08 ==
- Bishops Castle & Onny Valley
- Bournville
- Burntwood
- Harborne
- Old Halesonians
- Old Yardleians
- Moseley Oak
- Tamworth
- Telford Hornets
- Veseyans
- Willenhall

== Original teams ==
When this division was introduced in 2005 as Midlands 5 West (North), it contained the following teams:

- Bloxwich - transferred from North Midlands (North) (4th)
- Bournville - transferred from North Midlands (North) (9th)
- Cannock - transferred from Staffordshire 1 (champions)
- Essington - transferred from North Midlands (North) (7th)
- Five Ways Old Edwardians - transferred from North Midlands (North) (6th)
- Old Griffinians - transferred from North Midlands (North) (3rd)
- Selly Oak - relegated from Midlands 4 West (North) (9th)
- Warley -transferred from North Midlands (North) (5th)
- Yardley & District - relegated from Midlands 4 West (North) (10th)

== Midlands 4 West (North) honours ==
=== Midlands 5 West (North) (2005–2009) ===
Midlands 5 West (North) was introduced ahead of the 2005–06 season as a tier 9 league to replace the discontinued North Midlands (North) and Staffordshire 1 leagues. Promotion was to Midlands 4 West (North) and relegation to Midlands 6 West (North).

Midlands 5 West (North)
Season	No of teams	Champions	Runners–up	Relegated teams	Reference
2005–06	9	Old Griffinians	Selly Oak	Essington, Warley	
2006–07	10	Bournville	Kings Norton	Yardley & District, Rugeley	
2007–08	10	Handsworth	Cleobury Mortimer	Aldridge	
2008–09	11	Bloxwich	Telford Hornets	Five Ways Old Edwardians, Stourport	
Green backgrounds are promotion places.

=== Midlands 4 West (North) (2009–present) ===
Further league restructuring by the RFU meant that Midlands 5 West (North) and Midlands 5 West (South) were renamed as Midlands 4 West (North) and Midlands 4 West (South), with both leagues remaining at tier 9. Promotion was now to Midlands 3 West (North) (formerly Midlands 4 West (North)) and relegation to Midlands 5 West (North) (formerly Midlands 6 West (North)) until that league was discontinued at the end of the 2018–19 season.

Midlands 4 West (North) Honours
Season	No of teams	Champions	Runners–up	Relegated teams	Reference
2009–10	9	Eccleshall	Yardley & District	No relegation (Note: No relegation as the division would be increased from 9 to 11 teams for the following season.)	
2010–11	11	Harborne	Cleobury Mortimer	Warley, Essington	
2011–12	11	Edwardians	Bloxwich	Rugeley, St Leonards	
2012–13	11	Market Drayton	Uttoxeter	Telford Hornets, Barton-Under-Needwood	
2013–14	11	Harborne	Clee Hill	St Leonards, Warley	
2014–15	11	Cleobury Mortimer	Cannock	Tenbury, Greyhound	
2015–16	11	Uttoxeter	Telford Hornets	Market Drayton, Aldridge	
2016–17	12	Trentham	Barton-under-Needwood	St Leonards, Bishops Castle & Onny Valley	
2017–18	10	Eccleshall	Wednesbury	Church Stretton (Note: Church Stretton dropped out of the league before the season and were automatically relegated. No other teams were relegated this season.)	
2018–19	11	Linley	Willenhall	Bloxwich	
2019–20	12	Clee Hill	Aldridge	Cannock	
2020–21	12				
Green backgrounds are promotion places.

== Number of league titles ==
- Eccleshall (2)
- Harborne (2)
- Bloxwich (1)
- Bournville (1)
- Clee Hill (1)
- Cleobury Mortimer (1)
- Edwardians (1)
- Handsworth (1)
- Linley (1)
- Market Drayton (1)
- Old Griffinians (1)
- Trentham (1)
- Uttoxeter (1)

== See also ==
- Midlands RFU
- North Midlands RFU
- Staffordshire RU
- English rugby union system
- Rugby union in England
