= Staffordshire 1 =

Tier 9 English Rugby Union league

- Current season or competition: 2004–05 Staffordshire 1
- Sport: Rugby union
- Instituted: 1987; 39 years ago
- Ceased: 2005; 21 years ago
- Number of teams: 11
- Country: England
- Holders: Cannock (2nd title) (2004–05) (promoted to Midlands 5 West (North))
- Most titles: Handsworth, Uttoxeter (3 titles)

Staffordshire 1 was a tier 9 English Rugby Union league with teams from Staffordshire taking part. Promoted teams moved up to Midlands 5 West (North) and relegated teams dropped to Staffordshire 2 until that division was cancelled at the end of the 2003–04 season. Staffordshire 1 was itself cancelled one year later at the end of the 2004–05 campaign, with the majority of teams transferred into the newly introduced Midlands 6 West (North).

== Original teams ==
When league rugby began in 1987 this division contained the following teams:

- Burntwood
- Cannock
- Linley & Kidsgrove
- Rugeley
- Trentham
- Wednesbury
- Wulfrun (Note: Wulfrun would later merge with Old Oaks and Rubery Owen in 1998 to form Essington RUFC.)

== Staffordshire 1 honours ==
=== Staffordshire 1 (1987–1992) ===
The original Staffordshire 1 was a tier 8 league with promotion up to Staffordshire/Warwickshire 1 and relegation down to Staffordshire 2. At the end of the 1991–92 season the merging of all Staffordshire and Warwickshire leagues meant that Staffordshire 1 was discontinued for the years that these leagues were active (Note: The new format included four divisions; Staffordshire/Warwickshire 1, Staffordshire/Warwickshire 2, Staffordshire/Warwickshire 3 and Staffordshire/Warwickshire 4.).

Staffordshire 1
Season	No of teams	Champions	Runners–up	Relegated teams	Reference
1987–88	7	Trentham	Rugeley	Wulfrun, Wednesbury	
1988–89	7	Handsworth	Rugeley	Linley & Kidsgrove, Cannock	
1989–90	7	Uttoxeter	Eccleshall	Wednesbury	
1990–91	7	Eccleshall	Handsworth	Rugeley	
1991–92	7	Handsworth (Note: The restructuring of the Staffordshire & Warwickshire leagues meant that champions Handsworth were promoted two levels up to Midlands West 2.)	Trentham (Note: Restructuring meant that five clubs including Trentham, Wednesbury, GEC St Leonards, Linley & Kidsgrove and Uttoxeter were promoted into Staffordshire/Warwickshire 1.)	No relegation (Note: The cancellation of Staffordshire 1 and Staffordshire 2 meant that there was no relegation, with bottom clubs Cannock and Rubery Owen instead being transferred into the new Staffordshire/Warwickshire 2)	
Green backgrounds are promotion places.

=== Staffordshire (1996–1999) ===
Restructuring of the Staffordshire/Warwickshire leagues (Note: This restructuring saw the cancellation of Staffordshire/Warwickshire 2, Staffordshire/Warwickshire 3 and Staffordshire/Warwickshire 4 and the transfer of teams into Staffordshire and Warwickshire.) ahead of the 1996–97 season saw the reintroduction of a single Staffordshire league, which along with its counterpart Warwickshire was a tier 10 league. Promotion was to Staffordshire/Warwickshire 1 and there was no relegation until the reintroduction of Staffordshire 2 at the end of the 1998–99 season.

Staffordshire
Season	No of teams	Champions	Runners–up	Relegated teams	Reference
1996–97	9	Burntwood	Wednesbury	No relegation	
1997–98	8	Wednesbury	Cannock	No relegation	
1998–99	11	Uttoxeter	Bloxwich	Hanford, Eccleshall, Market Drayton, Rugeley (Note: Restructuring of the Staffordshire league into Staffordshire 1 and Staffordshire 2 meant that relegation was reintroduced for the 1998–99 season.)	
Green backgrounds are promotion places.

=== Staffordshire 1 (1999–2000) ===
At the end of the 1998–99 season Staffordshire was split into two divisions, with Staffordshire 1 sitting at level 10 of the league system. Promotion was to the newly introduced Midlands 4 West (North) (Note: Midlands 4 West (North) was introduced ahead of the 2000–01 season.) while relegation was to the reintroduced Staffordshire 2.

Staffordshire 1
Season	No of teams	Champions	Runners–up	Relegated teams	Reference
1999–00	6	Linley & Kidsgrove (Note: Due to the cancellation of Staffordshire/Warwickshire 1 at the end of the season, there was no promotion.)	Wheaton Aston & Penkridge	Cannock	
Green backgrounds are promotion places.

=== Staffordshire 1 (2000–2005) ===
The cancellation of Staffordshire/Warwickshire 1 would see Staffordshire 1 become a tier 9 league. Promotion was to Midlands 4 West (North) and relegation to Staffordshire 2 until that division was cancelled at the end of the 2003–04 season. At the end of the 2004–05 season Staffordshire 1 was cancelled and all teams transferred to the newly introduced Midlands 5 West (North) and Midlands 6 West (North) divisions.

Staffordshire 1
Season	No of teams	Champions	Runners–up	Relegated teams	Reference
2000–01	7	Wednesbury	Wheaton Aston & Penkridge	Rugeley	
2001–02	5	Uttoxeter	St Leonards	Whittingham, Cannock	
2002–03	6	Handsworth	Linley & Kidsgrove	Wheaton Aston & Penkridge	
2003–04	5	Cannock (Note: The remerging of Staffordshire 1 and Staffordshire 2 into a single Staffordshire 1 division meant that champions Cannock were not promoted.)	St Leonards	No relegation (Note: No relegation due to the cancellation of Staffordshire 2 at the end of the season.)	
2004–05	11	Cannock (Note: The cancellation of Staffordshire 1 at the end of the season, meant that champions Cannock were promoted two levels up into the new look Midlands 5 West (North).)	St Leonards (Note: Runners up St Leonards and the remaining 10 teams were transferred into the new look Midlands 6 West (North) at the end of the season.)	No relegation	
Green backgrounds are promotion places.

== Number of league titles ==
- Handsworth (3)
- Uttoxeter (3) (Note: One of Uttoxeter's titles was won when league was single division known as Staffordshire.)
- Cannock (2)
- Wednesbury (2) (Note: One of Wednesbury's titles was won when league was single division known as Staffordshire.)
- Burntwood (1) (Note: Burntwood's title was won when league was single division known as Staffordshire.)
- Eccleshall (1)
- Linley & Kidsgrove (1)
- Trentham (1)

== See also ==
- Staffordshire 2
- Midlands RFU
- Staffordshire RU
- Warwickshire RFU
- English rugby union system
- Rugby union in England
