= Midlands 6 West (North) =

English rugby union league

English Rugby Union Midland Division - Midlands 6 West (North) is an English Rugby Union League.

Midlands 6 West (North) is made up of teams from around the East Midlands of England who play home and away matches throughout a winter season. As with many low level they are often subject to re-structure

Promoted teams move up to Midlands 5 West (North).

== 2008-2009 Teams ==
- Aldridge
- Essington
- Hanford
- Market Drayton
- Rugeley
- Stone
- Wheaton Aston
- Whittington

== See also ==
- English rugby union system
