= RFU Junior Vase =

English rugby union competition

RFU Senior Vase
- Current season or competition: 2018–19 RFU Junior Vase
- Sport: Rugby union
- Instituted: 1990; 35 years ago
- Number of teams: Levels 9-12 of English rugby
- Nations: England (RFU)
- Holders: Reeds Weybridge (1st title) (2019 - 20)
- Most titles: Bradford Salem, Sheffield Tigers (2 titles)
- Website: England Rugby
- Related competition: Intermediate Cup, Senior Vase

The RFU Junior Vase is a rugby union national knockout cup competition in England run by the Rugby Football Union, which has been competed for since 1990. It is mostly contested by 1st XV teams at level 9 of the English rugby union system, although sides as low as level 12 or even outside the league system can sometimes enter. The competition is a national one, but split into regions until the national semi-finals with the final being held at Twickenham Stadium in London. Presently, the RFU Junior Vase is the fifth most important club cup competition in England, behind the Premiership Rugby Cup, RFU Championship Cup, RFU Intermediate Cup and RFU Senior Vase.

== History ==
The Vase was first contested for during the 1990–91 season, when it was known as the Provincial Insurance Cup (named after its sponsors). It was introduced by the RFU to provide a national cup competition for junior clubs in the English rugby union system not already competing in the Pilkington Cup, with a number of knock-out rounds culminating in the final held at Twickenham Stadium. The competition would have a number of different sponsors over the course of its history, including Provincial Insurance, Pilkington, NPI, Tetley's Brewery, Powergen and EDF Energy. Since the 2009–10 season the competition has been known as the RFU Junior Vase and is competed for by clubs playing in at level 9 of the league system. It is currently un-sponsored.

== Current format ==
The rounds are contested on a regional basis between the four regional unions (North, Midlands, London & South East, South West) until the semi-finals, where the winner of each region enters the national competition, with the winner of each semi-final meeting at the final at Twickenham Stadium. Each region has a different qualification method (more detail on this below) and at the end of this qualification there are four regional champions who play in the national semi-finals the ground being one of the semi-finalist's home. The semi-finals pairings are London & South East against South West and Midlands against North.

=== North ===
The format for northern teams involved in the RFU Junior Vase is a league-cup hybrid with each county union in the region typically selecting one representative each (although Cheshire have two representatives for the 2018–19 competition). The first stage features a mini league with clubs from Cheshire and Lancashire meeting in one pool and clubs from Durham County, Northumberland and Yorkshire, meeting in the other, each side playing 2 games each. The winners of each group then meet in the north final to determine who goes forward to the national semi-finals. The competition involves representative teams from the following unions and level 9-10 leagues:

- Cheshire – Lancs/Cheshire Division 3
- Durham County – Durham/Northumberland 3
- Lancashire – Lancs/Cheshire Division 3 (Note: The breakaway of 19 Lancashire RFU clubs at the start of the 2017–18 season meant that no clubs from this union have been involved in the RFU Junior Vase since that season.)
- Northumberland – Durham/Northumberland 3
- Yorkshire – Yorkshire 3, Yorkshire 4

=== Midlands ===
The format for Midlands teams involved in the RFU Junior Vase is a direct knockout cup with a 1st round, 2nd round, 3rd round, semi-finals and final, with all sides from the eligible leagues taking part. The winner of the final goes forward to the national semi-finals. The competition involves unions and clubs from the following level 9-10 leagues:

- East Midlands – Midlands 4 East (South)
- Leicestershire – Midlands 4 East (South)
- North Midlands – Midlands 4 West (North), Midlands 4 West (South), Midlands 5 West (North), Midlands 5 West (South)
- Notts, Lincs & Derbyshire – Midlands 4 East (North), Midlands 4 East (South)
- Staffordshire – Midlands 4 West (North), Midlands 5 West (North)
- Warwickshire – Midlands 4 West (South), Midlands 5 West (South)

=== London and South East ===
As with the Midlands the format for London and South East teams involved in the RFU Junior Vase is a direct knockout cup with a 1st round, 2nd round, 3rd round, semi-finals and final, with all eligible teams taking part. The winner of the final goes forward to the national semi-finals. The competition involves 1st XV teams from the following unions and level 9-12 leagues:

- Eastern Counties – Eastern Counties 1
- Essex – Essex Canterbury Jack 1
- Hampshire – Hampshire Premier, Hampshire 1
- Hertfordshire / Middlesex – Herts/Middlesex 1, Herts/Middlesex 2
- Kent – Shepherd Neame Kent 1, Shepherd Neame Kent 2
- Surrey – Surrey 1, Surrey 2, Surrey 3, Surrey 4
- Sussex – Sussex 1

=== South West ===
The format for the south-west teams in the RFU Junior Vase is more complex with different methods of qualification decided on by the county unions that they represent. Clubs that are affiliated with Dorset & Wilts and Gloucestershire play in county based knock-out competitions first. The winners of the Dorset & Wilts competition then plays in the Southern Counties semi-finals against representatives from Berkshire, Buckinghamshire and Oxfordshire, while the Gloucestershire winners play in the South West Counties semi-finals against representative from Cornwall, Devon and Somerset, with the winners then meeting in a regional final. Finally, the Southern Counties and South West Counties winners meet to determine qualification for the national semi-finals. Teams involved (1st XV only) are typically from the following unions and level 9-12 leagues:

- Berkshire / Buckinghamshire / Oxfordshire – Berks/Bucks & Oxon Championship
- Cornwall – Cornwall League 1
- Devon – Devon League 1
- Dorset & Wilts – Dorset & Wilts 2 North, Dorset & Wilts 2 South, Dorset & Wilts 3 North, Dorset & Wilts 3 South
- Gloucestershire – Gloucester 1
- Somerset – Somerset 1

== Competition results ==
Season	Winner	Score	Runners–up	Name
1990–91	Bradford Salem (N)	12–6	Bicester (SW)	Provincial Insurance Cup
1991–92	Bradford Salem (N)	17–12	Bicester (SW)	Provincial Insurance Cup
1992–93	Fleetwood (N)	13–7	Hitchin (SE)	Provincial Insurance Cup
1993–94	Malvern (M)	8–6	Old Hamptonians (SE)	Pilkington Shield
1994–95	Bedford Queens (M)	11-10	St Albans (SE)	Pilkington Shield
1995–96	Medicals (N)	10–6	Helston (SW)	Pilkington Shield
1996–97	Harpenden (SE)	34–29	Crewe (M)	NPI Junior Cup
1997–98	Huddersfield Y.M.C.A. (N)	40–8	West Leeds (N)	Tetley's Bitter Vase
1998–99	Billericay (SE)	19–3	Silhillians (M)	Tetley's Bitter Vase
1999–00	Sheffield Tigers (N)	20–11	Bank of England (SE)	Tetley's Bitter Vase
2000–01	Malton & Norton (N)	36–20	Hoylake (N)	Tetley's Bitter Vase
2001–02	Heath (N)	16–10	Bromley (SE)	Powergen Junior Vase
2002–03	Old Alleynians (SE)	16–10	Shipston-on-Stour (SW)	Powergen Junior Vase
2003–04	Leodiensians (N)	13–13 (Note: Leodiensians won the 2004 final on tries scored - 2 to 1.)	North Ribblesdale (N)	Powergen Junior Vase
2004–05	Sheffield Tigers (N)	30–13	Solihull (M)	Powergen Junior Vase
2005–06	Dorking (SE)	46–3	Cleobury Mortimer (SW)	Powergen Junior Vase
2006–07	Hartpury College (SW)	72–12	Billericay (SE)	EDF Energy Junior Vase
2007–08	Castleford (N)	14–11	Doncaster Phoenix (N)	EDF Energy Junior Vase
2008–09	Brighton (SE)	32–20	Liskeard-Looe (SW)	EDF Energy Junior Vase
2009–10	Teddington (SE)	43–21	Bramley Phoenix (N)	RFU Junior Vase
2010–11	H.A.C. (SE)	37–6	Edwardians (M)	RFU Junior Vase
2011–12	Baildon (N)	6–3	Harrow (SE)	RFU Junior Vase
2012–13	Newent (SW)	58–29	Baildon (N)	RFU Junior Vase
2013–14	Longlevens (SW)	23–12	Rugby Lions (M)	RFU Junior Vase
2014–15	Battersea Ironsides (SE)	23–7	Northallerton (N)	RFU Junior Vase
2015–16	Old Cranleighans (SE)	50–0	Buxton (N)	RFU Junior Vase
2016–17	Goole (N)	31–24	Spartans (Gloucester) (SW)	RFU Junior Vase
2017–18	Old Otliensians (N)	32–21	South Molton (SW)	RFU Junior Vase
2018–19	Reeds Weybridge (SE)	42–5	Thornensians (N)	RFU Junior Vase
(N) stands for Northern region, (M) for Midlands, (SE) for London & South East, (SW) for South-west

== Number of wins ==
=== Club ===
- Bradford Salem (2)
- Sheffield Tigers (2)
- Baildon (1)
- Battersea Ironsides (1)
- Bedford Queens (1)
- Billericay (1)
- Brighton (1)
- Castleford (1)
- Dorking (1)
- Fleetwood (1)
- Goole (1)
- H.A.C. (1)
- Harpenden (1)
- Hartpury College (1)
- Heath (1)
- Huddersfield Y.M.C.A. (1)
- Leodiensians (1)
- Longlevens (1)
- Malton & Norton (1)
- Malvern (1)
- Medicals (1)
- Newent (1)
- Old Alleynians (1)
- Old Cranleighans (1)
- Old Otliensians (1)
- Reeds Weybridge (1)
- Teddington (1)

=== Region ===
- North (14)
- London & South East (10)
- South West (3)
- Midlands (2)

== See also ==
- Anglo-Welsh Cup
- EDF Energy Trophy
- Premiership Rugby Cup
- RFU Championship Cup
- RFU Intermediate Cup
- RFU Senior Vase
- Rugby union in England
