= Valley coal mine =

Coal mine in United Kingdom

Coordinates: 52.7122°N 1.9906°W

Valley Colliery, commonly known as Valley Pit, was a deep coal mine and training centre located in Hednesford, Staffordshire, UK.

Situated at the foot of the Hednesford Hills, Valley Colliery was opened in 1874 and for 108 years served the area providing coal for homes and industries, including most notably Rugeley Power Station. The training centre and colliery closed for good in 1982.

Today the site of the former coal mine is home to The Museum of Cannock Chase which was opened by Cannock Chase District Council as the Valley Heritage Centre in 1989.

The currently standing museum is housed in some of the buildings which remain from the Valley Colliery.

Valley was one of many coal mines dotted around Cannock Chase and the wider Staffordshire area.
