= Castle Ring =

Iron Age hillfort in United Kingdom

Coordinates: 52.71284°N 1.93483°W

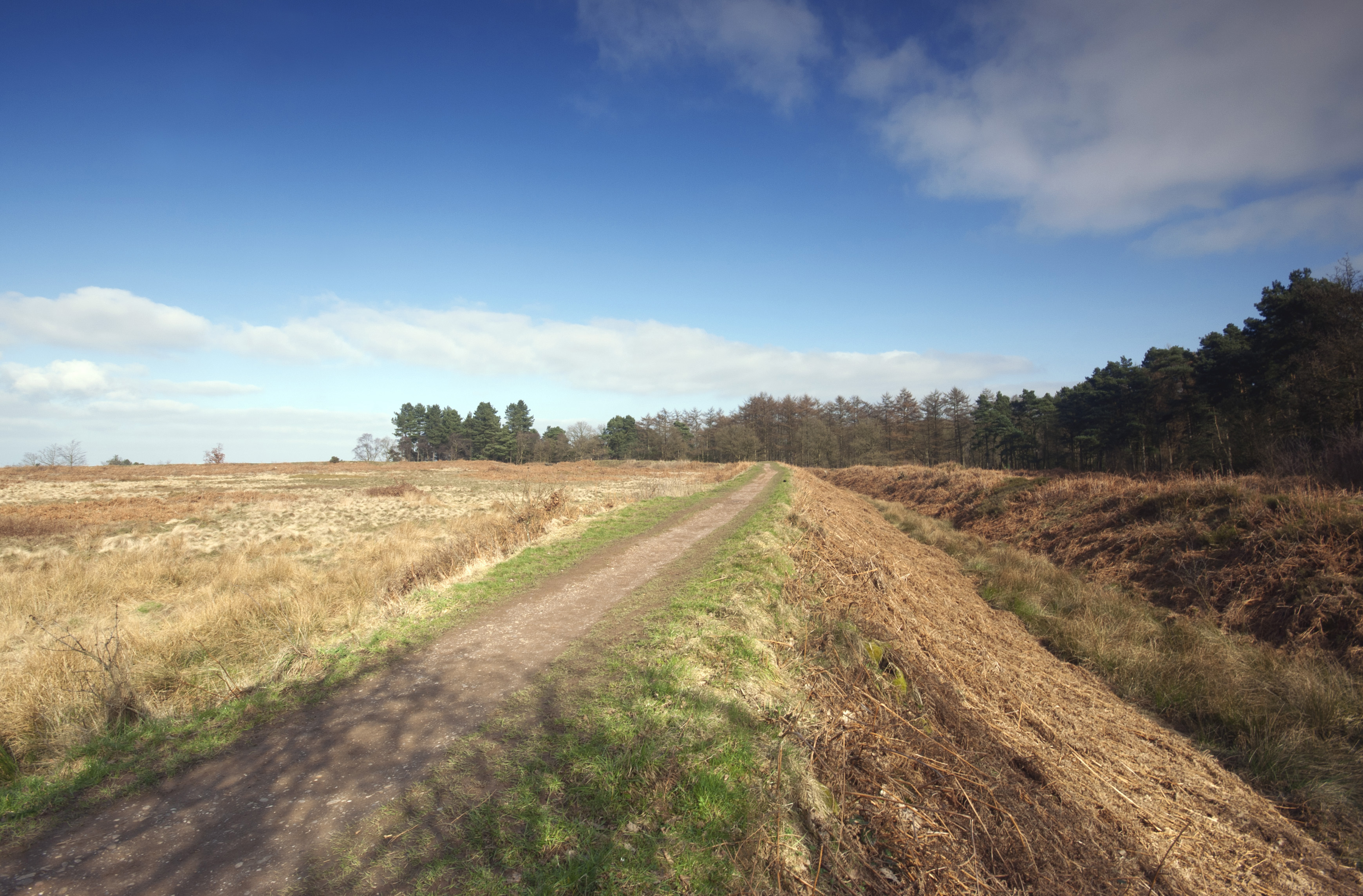

Highest point
- Elevation: 242 m (794 ft)

Geography
- Location: Staffordshire, England
- Parent range: Cannock Chase
- OS grid: SK044128
- Topo map: OS Landranger 128

Castle Ring is an Iron Age hill fort, situated high up on the southern edge of Cannock Chase (The Chase), Staffordshire, England.

It is the highest point on The Chase with an elevation of 242 metres (794 ft).

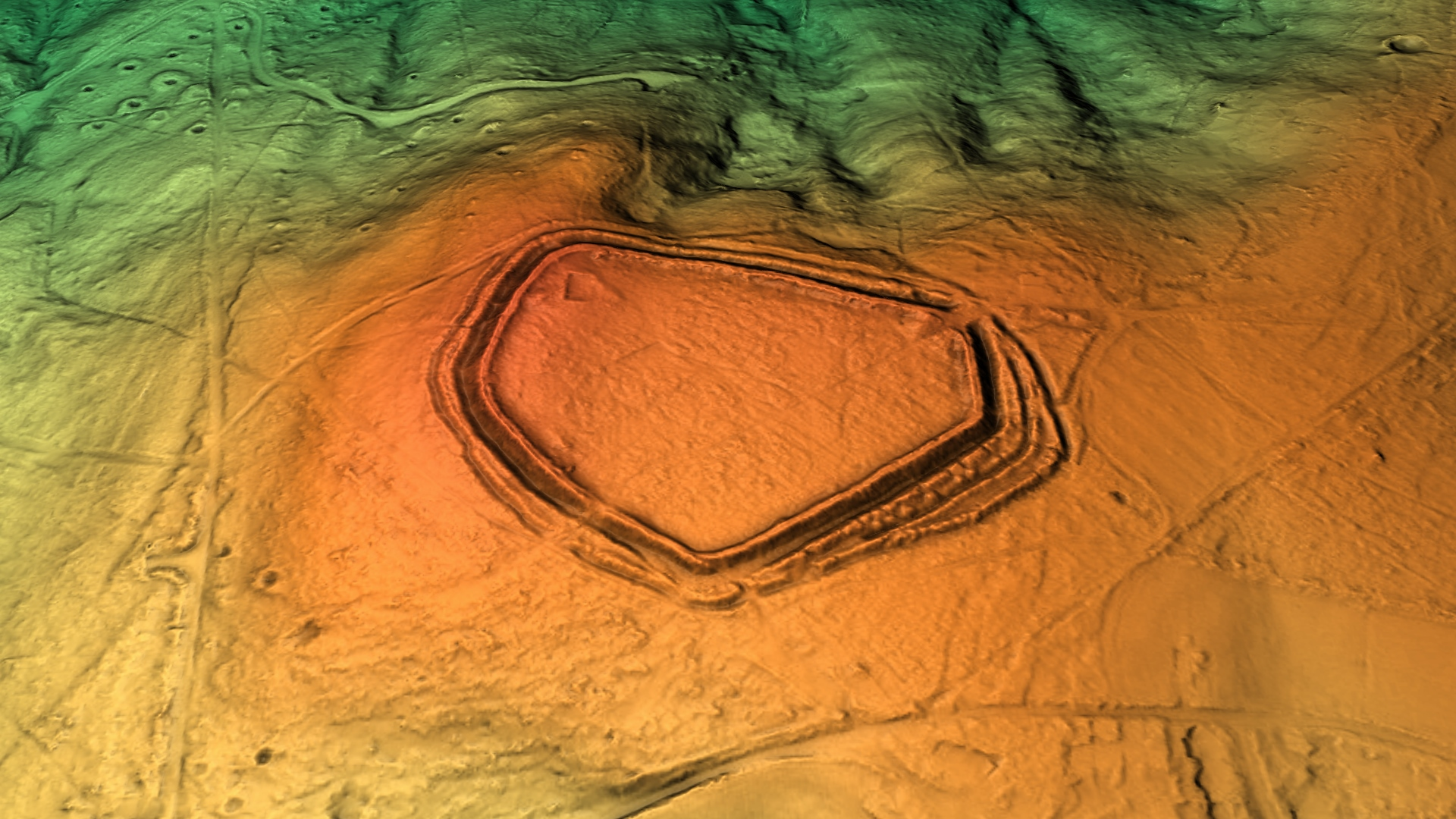
3D view of the digital terrain model

It is near the village of Cannock Wood, south of Rugeley and north of Burntwood, adjacent to the Heart of England Way. There are excellent views over The Chase, the Trent Valley and Staffordshire more generally.

The public are free to walk around it as there is a path.

== History ==
Castle Ring is thought to have first been occupied c. 500 BCE by an Ancient British (Celtic) tribe named the Cornovii. It was abandoned c. 43 CE as a consequence of Romans occupying the area.

Apart from perimeter earthworks, little remains visible. Parts of the ground in the ring appear to have been ploughed, but there is no consensus as to whether this was carried out in prehistoric times, or in the medieval period, when a hunting lodge was also built in the ring. The remains of this lodge are still visible.

== See also ==
- List of hill forts in England
- List of hill forts in Scotland
- List of hill forts in Wales
