= Uttoxeter RFC =

(England) Uttoxeter
- Full name: Uttoxeter Rugby Football Club
- Union: Staffordshire RU
- Founded: 1982; 44 years ago
- Location: Uttoxeter, Staffordshire, England
- Ground(s): Oldfields Sports & Social Club
- Chairman: (England) Anthony Davies
- Coach: (England) James Holmes
- Captain: (Scotland) Lewis Bain
- League: Counties 3 Midlands West (North)
- 2024-2025: 4th
Team kit

Largest win
- Uttoxeter 97 - Ripley Rhinos 12 (19 April 2008)

Official website
- www.uttoxeterrfc.rfu.club

Uttoxeter Rugby Football Club is an English rugby union club that plays in the Midlands Division.

== History ==
Uttoxeter Rugby Football Club was formed in 1982. It was formed from JCB Rugby Football Club, which ceased to exist at the end of the 1981/82 season.

Uttoxeter began the 1982/83, with the majority of the former JCB players now playing at Oldfields Sports and Social Club, in Uttoxeter, where they remain to this day.

Initially the Club ran three senior teams. They played their matches at either Oldfields Hall Middle School or on a field belonging to Fred Allen at the rear of the Shell Mex depot, on the Dovefields Industrial Estate, but were invited to use Oldfields Sports and Social Clubs facilities post match.

Eventually they acquired a pitch at Oldfields Sports and Social club despite objections from Soccer and Cricket players who were already operating teams at Oldfields.

Recently the Club has acquired the use of a second pitch adjacent to the Uttoxeter Leisure Centre, and added a Youth Section, with players from tag to under 18 level.

The Club has won the Owen Cup five times, most recently in the 2007/8 competition.

== Ground ==
The club plays its home games at Oldfields Sports & Social Club. The club makes use of a second pitch which is known as The Lido which is adjacent to Uttoxeter Leisure Centre

== Previous seasons ==
=== 2008–09 ===
2008–09 Midlands 6 East (NW)
Pos	Team	Pld	W	D	L	PF	PA	PD	Pts	Promotion
1	Uttoxeter (C, P)	14	12	0	2	560	75	+485	24	Promoted to Midlands 5 East (North) as champions
2	Dronfield (P)	14	11	1	2	417	179	+238	23	Promoted to Midlands 5 East (North) after winning playoff
3	Nottingham Boots Corsairs	14	11	0	3	436	127	+309	22	
4	Tupton	14	7	2	5	370	258	+112	14 (Note: 2 points deducted?)	
5	Long Eaton	14	6	0	8	223	283	−60	10	
6	All Spartans OB	14	2	2	10	134	403	−269	6	
7	University Of Derby	14	4	0	10	140	615	−475	6	
8	Meden Vale	14	0	1	13	121	461	−340	1	

(C) Champions; (P) Promoted

=== 2007–08 ===
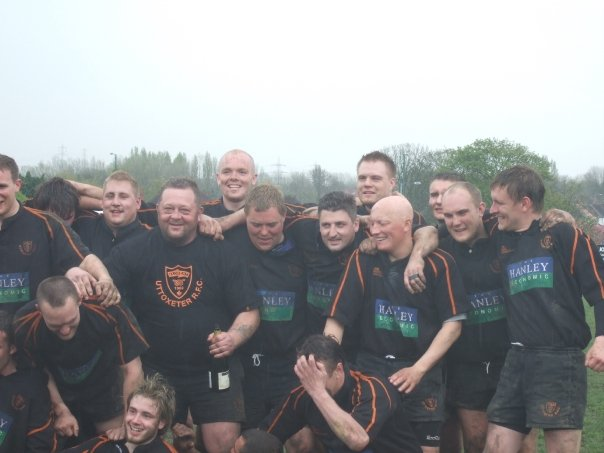
Uttoxeter Owen Cup Winners 2007-2008

2007–08 Midlands 6 East (NW)
Pos	Team	Pld	W	D	L	PF	PA	PD	Pts	Promotion
1	Belper (C, P)	18	15	0	3	628	113	+515	30	Promoted to Midlands 5 East (North) as champions
2	Leesbrook (P)	18	15	0	3	523	132	+391	30	Promoted to Midlands 5 East (North) after winning playoff
3	Uttoxeter	18	14	0	4	368	126	+242	28	
4	Keyworth	18	12	0	6	457	228	+229	24	
5	All Spartans OB	18	9	1	8	358	314	+44	19	
6	Tupton	18	7	2	9	306	446	−140	16	
7	Long Eaton	18	5	0	13	200	408	−208	10	
8	Meden Vale	18	4	1	13	213	451	−238	9	
9	Boots	18	4	0	14	153	644	−491	8	
10	Chesterfield	18	3	0	15	158	502	−344	6	

(C) Champions; (P) Promoted

==== Staffordshire Cup ====
Quarter-finals
Date - Stadium
Uttoxeter	29
Barton	10
Date - Stadium
Trentham	31
Eccleshall	11
Date - Stadium
Whittington	18
Essington	19
Date - Stadium
Rugeley	33
Hanford	10

Semi-finals
Date - Stadium
Uttoxeter	23
Trentham	11
Date - Stadium
Essington	HWO
Rugeley	HWO

Final
Walsall - May 2008
Uttoxeter	29
Essington	5

=== 2006–07 ===
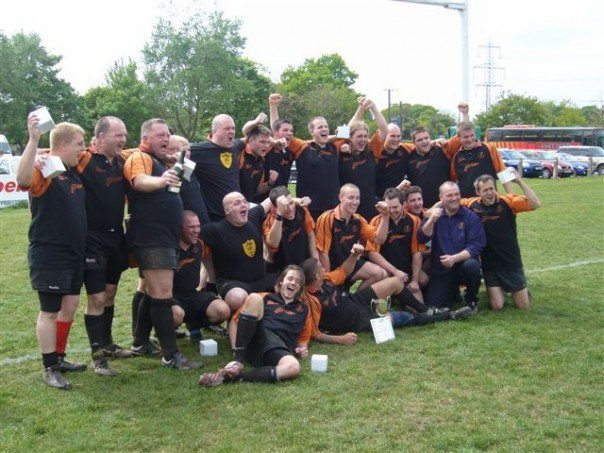
Uttoxeters Owen Cup Winners 2006-2007

2006–07 Midlands 6 East (NW)
Pos	Team	Pld	W	D	L	PF	PA	PD	Pts	Promotion
1	Melbourne (C, P)	18	15	1	2	506	124	+382	31	Promoted to Midlands 5 East (North) as champions
2	Rolls Royce (P)	18	14	0	4	487	254	+233	28	Promoted to Midlands 5 East (North) after winning playoff
3	Belper	18	14	0	4	395	235	+160	28	
4	Uttoxeter	18	11	0	7	351	204	+147	22	
5	Buxton	18	10	1	7	347	180	+167	21	
6	Leesbrook	18	9	0	9	350	271	+79	18	
7	Tupton	18	7	0	11	276	335	−59	14	
8	All Spartans OB	18	5	0	13	146	523	−377	10	
9	Chesterfield	18	2	0	16	155	496	−341	4	
10	Meden Vale	18	2	0	16	160	551	−391	4	

(C) Champions; (P) Promoted

==== Staffordshire Cup ====
Quarter-finals
Date - Stadium
Whittington	11
Uttoxeter	40
Date - Stadium
Date - Stadium
Date - Stadium

Semi-finals
Date - Stadium
Uttoxeter
Eccleshall
Date - Stadium
Rugeley	7
Trentham	48

Final
Lichfield - May 2008
Uttoxeter	7
Trentham	5

==== Preliminary round ====
Uttoxeter Stone

== Club honours ==
- Staffordshire 2 champions: 1987–88
- Staffordshire Owen Cup winners (6): 1989, 2001, 2002, 2007, 2008, 2010
- Staffordshire 1 champions (3): 1989–90, 1998–99, 2001–02
- Midlands 6 East (North-West) champions: 2008–09
- Midlands 4 East (North) champions: 2009–10
- Midlands 4 West (North) champions: 2015–16
- Midlands 3 West (North) champions: 2019–20

== See also ==
- Midlands RFU
- Staffordshire RU
