= Staffordshire 2 =

Tier 10 English Rugby union league

Staffordshire 1
- Current season or competition: 2003–04 Staffordshire 2
- Sport: Rugby union
- Instituted: 1987; 39 years ago
- Ceased: 2004; 22 years ago
- Country: England
- Holders: Eccleshall (2nd title) (2003–04) (promoted to Staffordshire 1)
- Most titles: Rugeley (3 titles)

Staffordshire 2 was a tier 10 English Rugby Union league with teams from Staffordshire taking part. Promoted teams moved up to Staffordshire 1 and there was no relegation. Staffordshire 2 was cancelled at the end of the 2003–04 season and all teams transferred into Staffordshire 1.

== Original teams ==
When league rugby began in 1987 this division contained the following teams:

- Cheadle (Note: Cheadle RUFC have since disbanded.)
- Eccleshall
- GEC St Leonards (Note: GEC St Leonards are now known as St Leonards RFC.)
- Michelin (Note: Michelin RUFC have since disbanded.)
- Old Oaks (Note: Old Oaks would later merge with Rubery Owen and Wulfrun in 1998 to form Essington RUFC.)
- Rubery Owen (Note: Rubery Owen would later merge with Old Oaks and Wulfrun in 1998 to form Essington RUFC.)
- St Matthews (Note: St Matthews Rugby Club have since disbanded.)
- Uttoxeter
- Wheaton Aston & Penkridge

== Staffordshire 2 honours ==
=== Staffordshire 1 (1987–1992) ===
The original Staffordshire 2 was a tier 10 league with promotion up to Staffordshire 1 and no relegation. At the end of the 1991–92 season the merging of all Staffordshire and Warwickshire leagues meant that Staffordshire 2 was discontinued for the years that these leagues were active (Note: The new format included four divisions; Staffordshire/Warwickshire 1, Staffordshire/Warwickshire 2, Staffordshire/Warwickshire 3 and Staffordshire/Warwickshire 4.).

Staffordshire 2
Season	No of teams	Champions	Runners–up	Relegated teams	Reference
1987–88	9	Uttoxeter	GEC St Leonards	No relegation	
1988–89	10	Eccleshall	Wednesbury	No relegation	
1989–90	9	Rubery Owen	Linley & Kidsgrove	No relegation	
1990–91	8	Wednesbury	Cannock	No relegation	
1991–92	8	Rugeley	Old Oaks	No relegation	
Green backgrounds are promotion places.

=== Staffordshire 2 (1999–2000) ===
At the end of the 1998–99 season Staffordshire 2 was reintroduced as a level 11 league following the splitting of Staffordshire into two divisions. Promotion was to Staffordshire 1 and there was no relegation.

Staffordshire 2
Season	No of teams	Champions	Runners–up	Relegated teams	Reference
1999–00	7	Rugeley	Stone	No relegation	
Green backgrounds are promotion places.

=== Staffordshire 1 (2000–2005) ===
The cancellation of Staffordshire/Warwickshire 1 would see Staffordshire 2 become a tier 10 league. Promotion was to Staffordshire 1 and there was no relegation. At the end of the 2003–04 season Staffordshire 2 was cancelled and all teams transferred Staffordshire 1.

Staffordshire 2
Season	No of teams	Champions	Runners–up	Relegated teams	Reference
2000–01	7	Cannock	Gnosall	No relegation	
2001–02	7	Rugeley	Stone	No relegation	
2002–03	7	Whittington	Cannock	No relegation	
2003–04	5	Eccleshall	Market Drayton (Note: Due to the cancellation of Staffordshire 2 all five clubs were promoted into Staffordshire 1 at the end of the season.)	No relegation	
Green backgrounds are promotion places.

== Number of league titles ==
- Rugeley (3)
- Eccleshall (2)
- Cannock (1)
- Rubery Owen (1)
- Uttoxeter (1)
- Wednesbury (1)
- Whittington (1)

== See also ==
- Staffordshire 1
- Midlands RFU
- Staffordshire RU
- English rugby union system
- Rugby union in England
