= Bishop's Castle Community College =

Location
- Brampton Road; Bishop's Castle; Shropshire, SY9 5AY; England; 52.4885°N 2.996°W

Information
- Type: Foundation school
- Established: 1922
- Local authority: Shropshire Council
- Department for Education URN: 123564 Tables
- Ofsted: Reports
- Headteacher: Mr R Thorley
- Gender: Coeducational
- Age: 11 to 16
- Enrolment: 512 as of January 2023
- Website: http://www.communitycollegebc.org.uk/

Bishop's Castle Community College is a coeducational secondary school located in Bishop's Castle in the English county of Shropshire.

Established in 1922 as Bishop's Castle County High School, today it is a foundation school administered by Shropshire Council. The school admits pupils from Bishop's Castle and surrounding villages.

The school offers GCSEs and BTECs as programmes of study for pupils.
