= Essington RUFC =

(England) Essington
- Full name: Essington Rugby Union Football Club
- Union: Staffordshire RU
- Founded: 1998; 28 years ago
- Location: Essington, Staffordshire, England
- Ground: High Hill Centre
- League: Midlands 4 West (North)
- 2021–22: 12th

Official website
- www.essingtonrugby.co.uk

Essington Rugby Union Football Club is an English rugby union club that plays in the Midlands Division in the Midlands 4 West (North) league. The club was formed in 1998 as a merger between 3 local sides - Old Oaks, Rubery Owen and Wulfrun.

== 2007 - 2008 Season ==
The 2007-2008 season saw Essington reach their first ever cup final.

Staffordshire Cup

Quarter-finals
Date - Stadium
Uttoxeter	29
Barton	10
Date - Stadium
Trentham	31
Eccleshall	11
Date - Stadium
Whittington	18
Essington	19
Date - Stadium
Rugeley	33
Hanford	10

Semi-finals
Date - Stadium
Uttoxeter	23
Trentham	11
Date - Stadium
Essington	HWO
Rugeley	HWO

Final
Walsall - May 2008
Uttoxeter	29
Essington	5

== Club Honours ==
- Staffordshire 2 champions: 1989–90 (Note: Staffordshire 2 title won by parent club Rubery Owen.)
- North Midlands 3 champions: 1994–95 (Note: North Midlands 3 title won by parent club Wulfrun.)
- Midlands 5 West (North) champions (2): 2008–09, 2015–16
- Staffordshire Rubery Owen Cup winners (2): 2012, 2015
