= Huntington, Staffordshire =

Village in Staffordshire, England

Coordinates: 52.715°N 2.042°W

Huntington
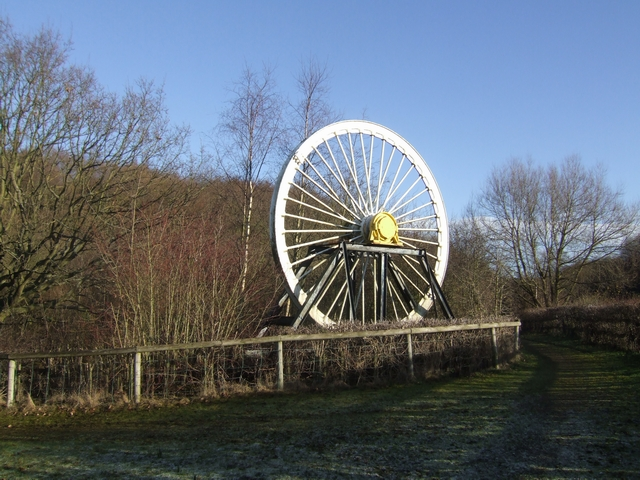
- Littleton Leisure Park

- Location within Staffordshire
- Population: 4,715
- OS grid reference: SJ973130
- Civil parish: Huntington
- District: South Staffordshire
- Shire county: Staffordshire
- Region: West Midlands
- Country: England
- Sovereign state: United Kingdom
- Post town: CANNOCK
- Postcode district: WS12
- Police: Staffordshire
- Fire: Staffordshire
- Ambulance: West Midlands
- UK Parliament: Stone, Great Wyrley and Penkridge

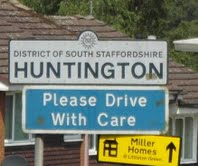
Huntington name sign

Huntington is a civil parish and former mining village in Staffordshire, on the outskirts of Cannock Chase. It lies on the A34 road just north of Cannock and is surrounded by woodland. The village had an estimated population of 3,720 in 2004, increasing to 4,536 at the 2011 Census. The population in Huntington on the 2021 census was 4,715, a 3.94% increase from the decade before.

== History ==
=== Early history ===
The name Huntington is possibly Anglo-Saxon in origin, “ton” meaning a hamlet grouped around a hunting lodge in a forest. There is no single source of the settlement's history, but A History of the County of Stafford does provide an important insight into the early period of the village.

Although only 4 km from Watling Street, the only Roman evidence found in Huntington was a coin and some pottery found near Cavans Wood in 1950.

The Domesday record of 1086 shows the existence of Estendome but this may have been an error by the scribe as in 1198 the name is recorded as Huntendon and in 1262 as Huntingdon, meaning “hill of the huntsmen”.

Records show Richard Forester was responsible for the village and managed the royal hunting forest of Cannock Chase for King William I. During the 12th and 13th century, the area was part of the land of Lord Pillaton.

The Chase and its forest is now a designated Area of Outstanding Natural Beauty and deer still roam the area today.

=== St Margaret Chapel ===
A medieval chapel, St Margaret-within-Cannock, was established around 1548 but the site now lies buried under the east slope of the former colliery spoil heap. There was possibly a medieval homestead and moat either in the north-west of the village or on the south side of Limepit Lane (originally Stonepit Lane). It was in this period that the name Huntington became more commonly used after many variations.

Another medieval feature is St Chad's Ditch on the eastern edge of the parish along a line of the trees known as Huntington Belt. This ditch and bank possibly marked a boundary between who had hunting rights over different parts of the Chase and that included the Bishops of Lichfield at St Mary and St Chads Cathedral.

In 1661 there were 46 households and even in 1801 the population was only 114. The 1841 Tithe map (3) shows Lord Hatherton of the Littleton family owned nearly all the land in the “Township of Huntington” and the 1851 Census recorded 121 residents and over 800 acres of land.

The Littletons originally lived at Pillaton Hall to the west of Huntington and then from 1742 until 1930 at Teddesley Hall (now demolished) just to the north. (4)

In 1870, John Marius Wilson's Imperial Gazetteer of England and Wales (5) described Huntington as a township with 32 houses and a population of 161 from which “large quantities of white gravel have been sent hence to different parts of the kingdom for garden walks.” The gravel pit was also shown on the 1841 tithe map.

=== Huntington Farm ===
Huntington Farm, dating from the early 18th Century, is now part of “The Barns Hotel”, a Grade II listed building in Cocksparrow Lane. Oaklands Farm (which apparently lent pigs to the BBC 1970's All Creatures Great and Small) in Limepit Lane and Doggintree Farm also dated from the 18th Century but have been demolished for housing.

“The Cottage” (now a B&B and restaurant) on the corner of Pear Tree Close is one of the oldest remaining buildings dating back to the 1770s. Several buildings of Pear Tree Farm remain from an older farm as do a few cottages from the 19th century hamlet near to the church.

=== Coal mining ===
Huntington has a rich coal mining heritage that stretches back hundreds of years. The village sits on the Cannock Chase coalfield, an extension of the South Staffordshire coalfield, that clusters around Cannock Chase.

The main colliery in the village was Littleton. It was sunk in 1877 but the original sinkings were lost through flooding and new shafts were sunk between 1899 and 1902. Despite its chequered start, the pit became one of the largest in the Midlands and the last colliery remaining on Cannock Chase. It was extensively modernised by the National Coal Board and in 1982 employed 1,900 miners, mining nearly a million tonnes of coal. However, after the controversial pit closure programme of the early 1990s, Littleton closed in 1994, overturning a reprieval a year earlier. The pit has now been completely demolished and the former spoil tip has been redeveloped as an area for walkers known as Littleton Leisure Park.

== St. Thomas Church ==
St. Thomas Church was designed by Andrew Hayward and built in 1872. The Church was extended in 1879 and in 2016 a new stained glass window installed commemorating the mining history of the village.

The school originally used the church site with another building added on the opposite side of the road erected by Lord Hatherton in 1898. Further building provided both a secondary modern school and primary school. These old school sites are now areas of housing with the new primary school on Colliers Way..

== Huntington Parish Council ==
11 Councillors currently serve on the Huntington Parish Council with the Parish being divided into two wards. The Littleton Ward covers the south end of the Parish and Chase Ward covers the North. The current chairman is Cllr John Newman and Vice Chairperson is Cllr Debbie Davies. The longest serving Councillor is Cllr Jeff Ashley that has amassed nearly 50 years of service as a councillor and was also a South Staffs District Councillor for 28 years. Council meetings are held every second Thursday of the month and are held in the Huntington Community Centre.

== Huntington Memorial Garden ==
The Huntington Memorial Garden opened in 2019 which remembers the local war heroes of World War I and the Second World War. Bricks with the names of those who used to work down the Littleton Colliery form the foundation of the monument and a former mining winding wheel is situated on top. The Memorial Garden was funded by Huntington Parish Council and was spearheaded by Parish Councillor Scott Allport who chaired the Memorial Garden Committee. It was designed by architect Colin Sutton and cost in the region of £115,000 to create.

== Village amenities ==
Huntington has a number of facilities, including two pubs, The Littleton Arms and The Barns, as well as a Mccolls store which includes a post office, and a Co-Op. There is also a Fish & Chip shop and Indian Restaurant.

The Littleton Arms used to be known as Coggers, where the miners used to go for a drink after work.

Littleton Green Community School caters for children aged 3–11. It opened on the site of the former Littleton Colliery on 9 November 2009. It replaces Huntington Community Primary School.

The village is served by frequent buses from Cannock town centre, operated by Chaserider.

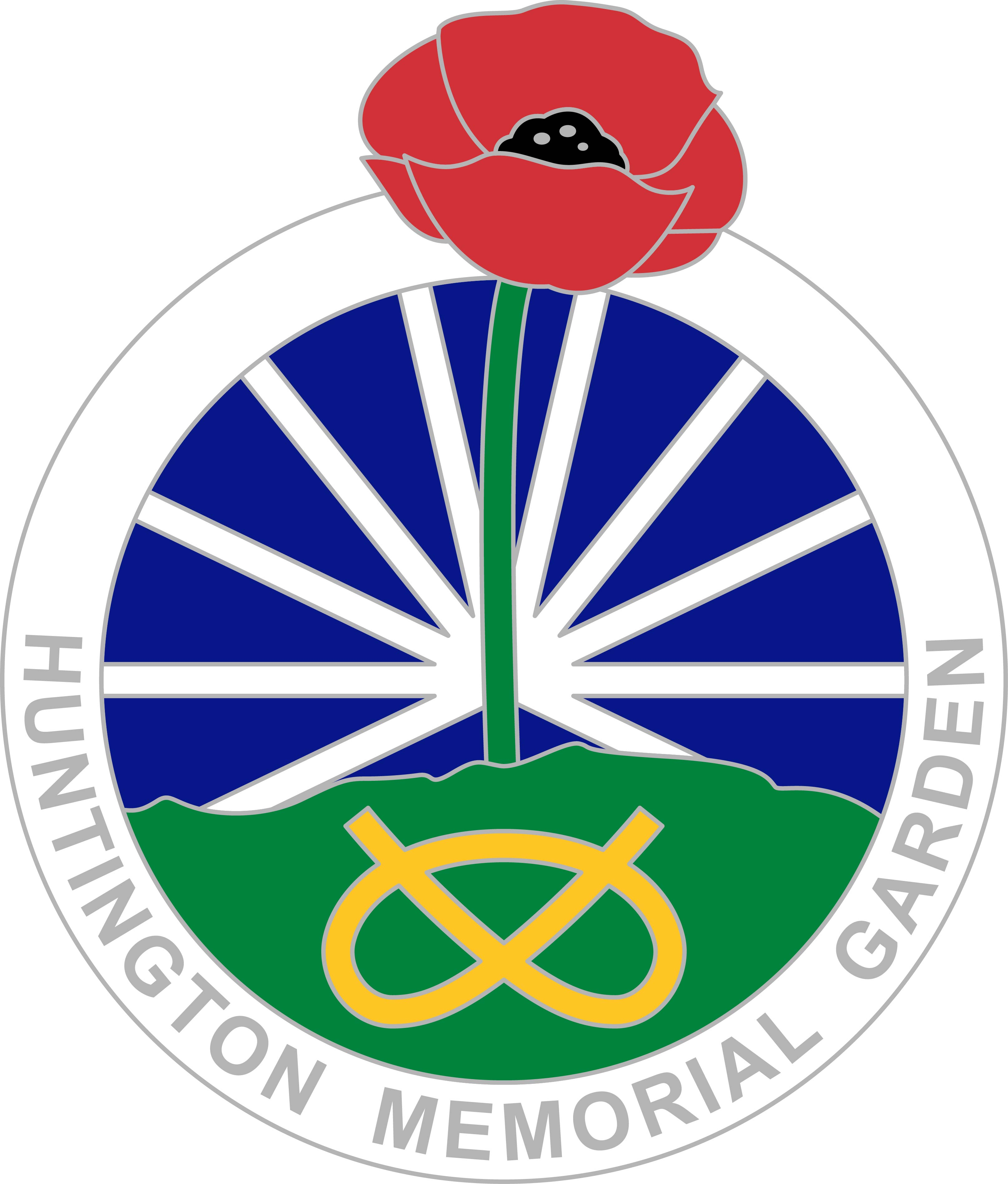
Huntington Memorial Garden Logo. Designed by Scott Allport

== Notable people ==
- James Simester (1871 in Huntington - 1905) he was converted at age fourteen and called to preach when sixteen, became an American Methodist missionary and educator to Fuzhou, China.

== Listed building ==
The parish contains one listed building, Huntington Farmhouse, which is designated at Grade II, the lowest of the three grades, which is applied to "buildings of national importance and special interest". The farmhouse is in red brick with storey bands, a moulded eaves cornice and a tile roof. There are two storeys and an attic, and it consists of a central range and two projecting gabled cross-wings. The doorway has pilasters and a fanlight, and the windows are casements with segmental heads.
