= Wednesbury RUFC =

Coordinates: 52°33′47″N 2°01′22″W

(England) Wednesbury
- Full name: Wednesbury Rugby Union Football Club
- Union: Staffordshire RU
- Founded: 1921; 104 years ago
- Location: Wednesbury, West Midlands, England
- Ground(s): Woden Road North
- League(s): Midlands 3 West (North)
- 2019–20: 11th (relegated to Midlands 4 West (North))
Team kit

Official website
- wednesburyrufc.rfu.club

Wednesbury Rugby Club is a rugby union club based in Wednesbury, West Midlands, England. It was founded in 1921 and is the home of the world's tallest rugby posts.

Fabricated from steel tube by Irvon steel and galvanized by Joseph Ash, the posts stand 38.26 m (125.5 ft; 1,506 in) high, and needed a special crane to help erect them. The posts surpassed the previous tallest of 110 ft 1/2 in (33.54 m) that can be found at the Roan Antelope club in Zambia, Africa.

The club currently stands in the Midlands 4 North West League and regularly runs out two teams on a weekly basis, A 1st XV playing the league and cup matches and a Development (2nd XV) Team playing the in Merit League. Wednesbury Rugby Club have also in the past 12 months (2019-2020) relaunched their youth and mini teams, gaining over 50 new youth and mini players in preparation to join the leagues and play competitive rugby at all age groups.

== Club Honours ==
- Staffordshire 2 champions: 1990–91
- Staffordshire 1 champions (2): 1997–98, 2000–01
- Midlands 4 West (North) champions: 2003–04
- Staffordshire Owen Cup winners: 2017

== See also ==
- Midlands RFU
- Staffordshire RU
