= Cannock Chase =

Mixed area of countryside in Staffordshire, England

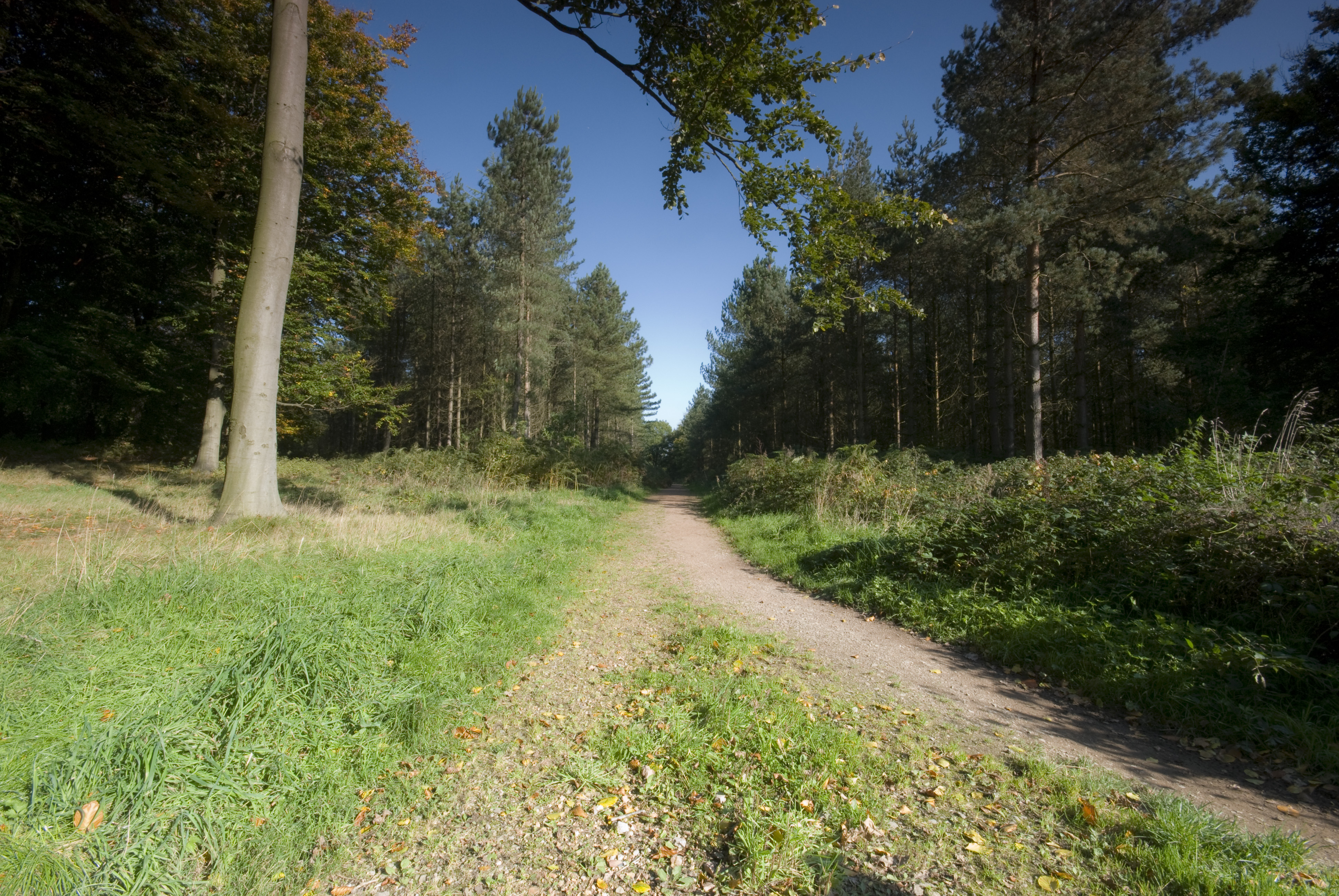
- A path in Cannock Chase

- Location of the Cannock Chase National Landscape area in England
- Location: Staffordshire, England
- Coordinates: 52.746°N 2.001°W (grid reference SK000165)
- Area: 68 km^{2} (26 sq mi)
- Established: 1958
- Visitors: 2.3 million (in 2010-11)
- Website: Official website

Cannock Chase, often referred to locally as The Chase, is a mixed area of countryside in the county of Staffordshire, England. The area has been designated as the Cannock Chase National Landscape, an Area of Outstanding Natural Beauty, and much of it is managed by Forestry England for its important ecology and for recreational use. The Chase gives its name to the Cannock Chase local government district. It is a former Royal forest.

== Geology ==
With the exception of the southeastern area, the Chase is almost wholly underlain by sandstones and conglomerates of the Chester Formation dating from the Triassic period. Formerly known as the Cannock Chase Formation, these form a part of the Sherwood Sandstone Group. Overlying these rocks in the Rugeley area are the, often pebbly, sandstones of the Helsby Sandstone Formation, formerly referred to in this area as the Bromsgrove Sandstone. Older literature will often refer to the bunter sandstone, a name which geologists no longer apply to the New Red Sandstone of Britain. Southeast of Rugeley Road the bedrock is provided by the mudstones, siltstones and sandstones of the Pennine Middle Coal Measures Formation, a succession dating from the end of the Carboniferous period, and which is separated from the overlying New Red Sandstone rocks by an unconformity. The Hednesford Hills are formed by the Chester Formation sandstones.

A 'humped profile' dry valley running west–east, and followed by the bridleway between Brocton and Beggar's Hill is interpreted as a glacial overflow channel, operative during the ice age. An expanse of glacial till underlies Haywood Warren with smaller patches mapped elsewhere. Sand and gravel have been quarried in different parts of the Chase over the years, as at Wolseley today.

== Landscape, flora and fauna ==
The Chase is located between Hednesford, Huntington, Lichfield, Rugeley, Brocton, Milford and Stafford. It comprises a mixture of natural deciduous woodland, coniferous plantations, open heathland, small lakes and the remains of early industry, such as coal mining. The Chase was designated as an Area of Outstanding Natural Beauty (AONB) on 16 September 1958 and is the smallest area so designated in mainland Britain, covering 68 km^{2} (26 sq mi). Much of the area is also designated as a Site of Special Scientific Interest (SSSI). Despite being relatively small in area, the chase provides a remarkable range of landscape and wildlife, including a herd of around 800 fallow deer and a number of rare and endangered birds, including migrant nightjars.

Efforts are underway to increase the amount of heathland on the chase, reintroducing shrubs such as heather in some areas where bracken and birch forest have crowded out most other plants. The local flora also includes several species of Vaccinium, including the eponymous Cannock Chase berry (Vaccinium × intermedium Ruthe). In January 2009, an outbreak of the plant pathogen Phytophthora ramorum was discovered on the chase, at Brocton Coppice. Various restrictions were put in place in an attempt to prevent its spread.

== Recreation ==
The chase is an important local amenity for recreation, with 58% of the National Landscape area publicly accessible, and several visitor attractions lie within it. While only around 10,000 people live within the National Landscape area itself, 135,000 people live within a 30 minute walk of the area, and 3.2 million people live within a one hour drive of the area. It received an estimated 2.3 million visitors in 2010-11.

=== Visitor sites and landmarks ===
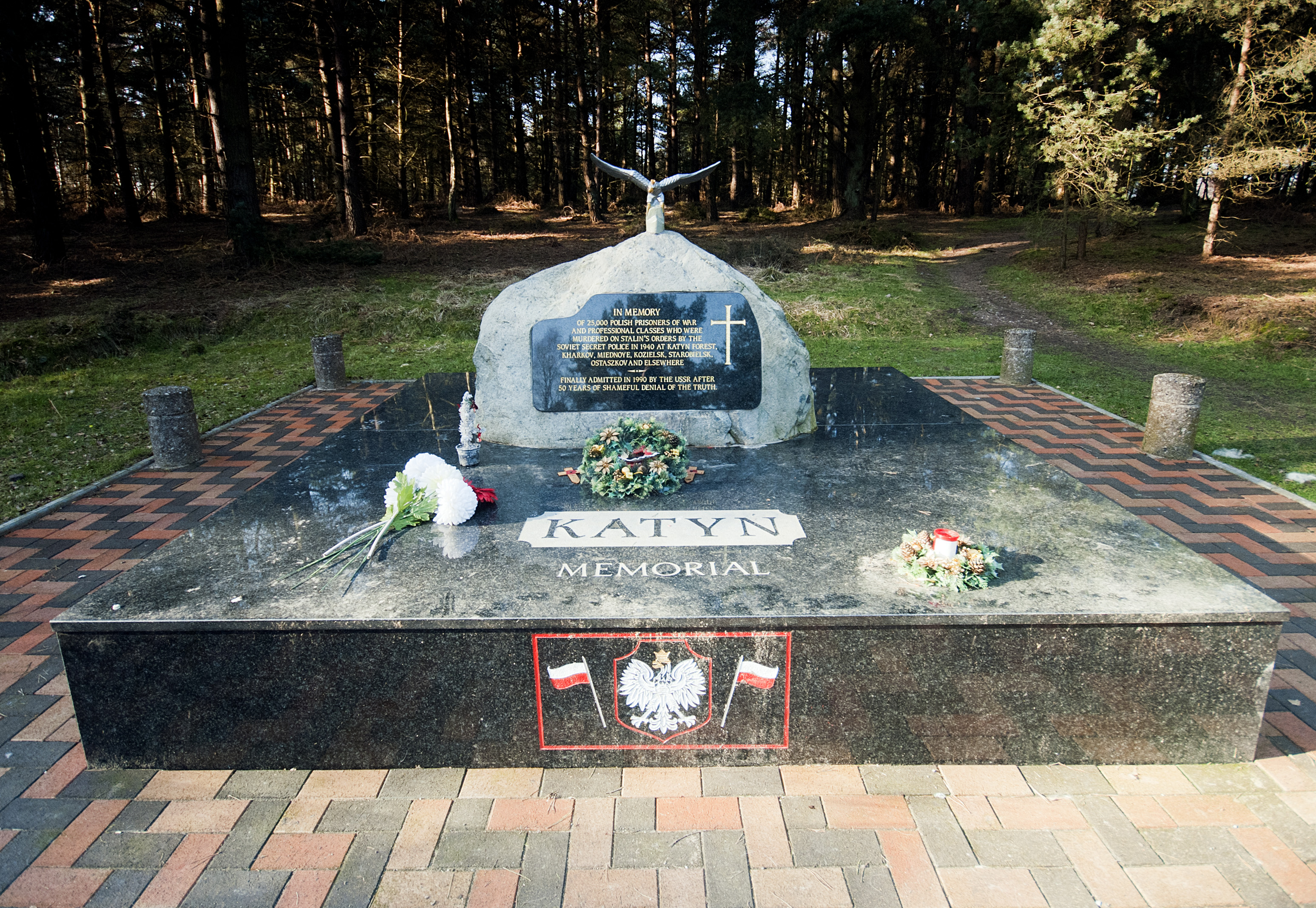
The Katyn Memorial at Cannock Chase.

There are a number of visitor centres, museums and waymarked paths, including the Heart of England Way and the Staffordshire Way. There are also accessible trails to enable people to experience the health benefits of the Chase, such as The Route to Health. Additionally, there are many unmarked public paths. On the north-eastern edge of the Chase can be found Shugborough Hall, ancestral home of the Earls of Lichfield. At its southern edge are the remains of Castle Ring, an Iron Age hill fort, which at 242 metres (794 ft) is the highest point on the Chase. Several glacial erratic boulders are also found on the Chase, remnants of glaciation. One is mounted on a plinth.

The Chase has several war memorials, including German and Commonwealth war cemeteries. A memorial to the victims of the Katyn massacre was unveiled by Stefan Staniszewski, whose father Hillary, Zygmunt Staniszewski, died in the massacre. Preserved below the memorial are phials of soil from both Warsaw and the Katyn forest. Freda, the Harlequin Great Dane mascot of the New Zealand Rifle Brigade (Earl of Liverpool's Own) is also buried on the chase marked with a memorial marble headstone.

=== Mountain biking ===
The Chase is popular with cross-country mountain bike users. The purpose-built XC 'Follow the Dog' trail is an 11 km (6.8 mi) technically challenging route, opened in 2005, starting and finishing at the Birches Valley Visitors/Cycle Centre. It is open to all; however, it is not recommended for beginners. A new section of XC trail was opened in April 2010. The 'Monkey Trail' (11.2 km (7.0 mi)) is a more technical trail that splits from 'Follow the Dog' at about the halfway point, then rejoins slightly further on. There are several features mountain bikers can discover when riding on the chase, such as Kitbag Hill, Rabbit Hill, Quagmire Bridge, Roots Hall and Brocton Shorts.

Increasing popularity of the MTB trails led Network Rail to install a cycle bridge in 2013 at Moors Gorse to replace the previous pedestrian level crossing where multiple near misses indicated a high risk to cyclists.

=== Entertainment ===
Since 2006, the forest has been used as an open-air music venue as part of the Forestry England nationwide Forest Live, with acts such as The Zutons, The Feeling, Status Quo and Jools Holland playing in a forest clearing. Also contained within the chase is Hednesford Hills Raceway a historic venue that frequently hosts Stock Car Racing and Banger Racing.

== History and archaeology ==
=== Model WW I battlefield ===
A model World War I battlefield was constructed near Brocton by German prisoners of war held in a camp on nearby Cannock Chase and guarded by soldiers of the New Zealand Rifle Brigade. The model was of the village and surrounding area of Messines in Belgium, which included replica trenches and dugouts, railway lines, roads, and accurate contours of the surrounding terrain.

In September 2013 Staffordshire County Council allowed a team of local archaeologists and volunteers to excavate the well-preserved battlefield, revealing many new details. Staffordshire County Council used laser-scanning technology to recreate the site as a 3D interactive model that can be explored online. The model was open to public view for a few weeks before being buried again to ensure its preservation.

=== The Chase Through Time ===
The Chase Through Time project (2016–18) explored two thousand years of the history of the landscape of Cannock Chase AONB. It was a partnership between Staffordshire County Council, Historic England and the Heritage Lottery Fund.

An archaeological survey using lidar which enabled researchers to see beneath trees coverage, and map usually unseen archaeological features in combination with historic aerial photographs, which illustrated changes to the landscape over the last 70 years. The project mapped archaeology from prehistoric burnt mounds, medieval and later coal mining, post medieval land division showing the early land management of the Chase, and aspects of the landscape's use in the First World War. 565 archaeological sites were mapped, with 436 of these sites new to the record.

=== Cannock Chase murders ===
The area gained notoriety in the late 1960s when the Cannock Chase murders made national headlines. The remains of three young girls were found on the Chase after going missing from areas along the A34 road between there and Birmingham. Raymond Leslie Morris, a motor engineer from Walsall, was found guilty at Stafford assizes of one of the murders in 1968 and was sentenced to life imprisonment. He died in prison in March 2014, aged 84, after serving 45 years.

== In popular culture ==
Since the 1970s, sightings of Black Dogs, Werewolves, and British big cats have been reported in the local press. However no conclusive evidence has ever been produced verifying these claims, and they may best be thought of as forming part of local folklore.

The 1972 Labi Siffre album Crying Laughing Loving Lying features a track, written on Cannock Chase, and named after it. The song "Cannock Chase", used as the closing credits song of the multi-Oscar nominated 2025 movie Sentimental Value.

== See also ==
- Beaudesert
- Cannock Chase German Military Cemetery
- Castle Ring
- Chase Line
- Valley coal mine
