= Staffordshire Rugby Union =

(England) Staffordshire RU
- Full name: Staffordshire Rugby Union
- Union: RFU
- Founded: 1923; 103 years ago
- Region: Staffordshire
- Chairman: John McDermott
- President: John McDermott
Team kit

Official website
- www.staffsrfu.com

The Staffordshire Rugby Union is the governing body for the sport of rugby union in the county of Staffordshire in England. The union is the constituent body of the Rugby Football Union (RFU) for Staffordshire, and administers and organises rugby union clubs and competitions in the county. It also administers the Staffordshire county rugby representative teams.

== History ==
Although there had been a number of long established clubs such as Burton (founded in 1870), Lichfield (1874) and Wolverhampton (1875), it took until 1923 for the Staffordshire Rugby Union to be formed, when it was part of the North Midlands Rugby Football Union. As the county started to find its identity in the 1920s more sides would start to form, with clubs such as Walsall (1921) and Stafford (1925) coming into existence during this period.

Despite its formation in 1923, Staffordshire would not be recognised as a constituent body by the RFU until the 1960s. In 1961 a representative side defeated the reigning county champions Cheshire in a friendly match. This result showed the RFU that Staffordshire were ready to be included in the County Championships and the following year they would take part for the first time, being finally awarded constituent body status in 1962. On 14 March 1970, Staffordshire won the County Championship when they upset favourites Gloucestershire 11–9 in the final played at Peel Croft in Burton upon Trent.

Since the glory days of 1970 Staffordshire have failed to win another county championship, and the reformation of the county game at the start of the 21st century saw them drop down to the third tier. In 2016 Staffordshire won both of their pool games in the Shield competition, reaching Twickenham for the very first time. Unfortunately they were unable to add to their silverware as they were beaten 11–30 by Hampshire in the final. Despite losing the final, Staffordshire were promoted to tier 2 of the championships along with winners Hampshire, for the 2017 competition.

== Staffordshire senior men's county side ==
The Staffordshire seniors men's team currently play in Division 2 of the County Championship.

Honours:

- County Championship winners: 1970

== Affiliated clubs ==
There are currently 31 clubs affiliated with the Staffordshire RU, most of which have teams at both senior and junior level and are based in Staffordshire and bordering parts of the West Midlands. Due to county boundary changes enforced by the Local Government Act 1972, several clubs (but not all) who are based in what is now known as West Midlands are also members of the North Midlands RFU as well as the Staffordshire RU.

- Barton-under-Needwood
- Bloxwich (Note: Bloxwich are joint members of the North Midlands RFU and Staffordshire RU.)
- Burntwood
- Burton
- Cannock
- Eccleshall
- Essington (Note: Essington are joint members of the North Midlands RFU and Staffordshire RU.)
- Featherstone
- Gnosall
- Handsworth
- Hanford
- Leek
- Lichfield
- Linley & Kidsgrove
- Longton
- Market Drayton
- Newcastle-under-Lyme
- Rugeley
- St Leonards
- Stafford
- Stoke-on-Trent
- Stone
- Tamworth
- Trentham
- Uttoxeter
- Walsall (Note: Walsall are joint members of the North Midlands RFU and Staffordshire RU.)
- Wednesbury
- Wheaton Aston & Penkridge
- Whittington
- Willenhall
- Wolverhampton

== County club competitions ==
The Staffordshire RU currently runs the following competitions for club sides based in Staffordshire:

=== Cups ===
- Staffordshire Senior Cup – introduced in 1976, open to local clubs playing at tiers 5–7 of the English rugby union league system
- Staffordshire Intermediate Cup – introduced in 2001, open to clubs at tiers 7–8
- Staffordshire Owen Cup – introduced in 1980, open to clubs at tiers 8–10

=== Discontinued competitions ===
- Staffordshire/Warwickshire 1 – tier 7-10 league for Staffordshire and Warwickshire clubs that ran between 1987 and 2000
- Staffordshire/Warwickshire 2 – tier 10-11 league for Staffordshire and Warwickshire clubs that ran between 1992 and 1996
- Staffordshire/Warwickshire 3 – tier 11-12 league for Staffordshire and Warwickshire clubs that ran between 1992 and 1996
- Staffordshire/Warwickshire 4 – tier 12-13 league for Staffordshire and Warwickshire clubs that ran between 1992 and 1996
- Staffordshire 1 – tier 8-10 league that ran intermittently between 1987 and 2005
- Staffordshire 2 – tier 10-11 league that ran intermittently between 1987 and 2004
- Midlands 5 West (North) (Note: Midlands 5 West (North) was known as Midlands 6 West (North) between 2005 and 2009.) – tier 10 league for Staffordshire and North Midlands clubs that ran between 2005 and 2019

== See also ==
- Midland Division
- English rugby union system
