= MRFC =

MRFC may refer to:

== Rugby union ==
- Malvern RFC
- Medicals RFC
- Melbourne Rugby Football Club
- Moseley Rugby Football Club
- München RFC
- Maldon RFC

== Football ==
- Maine Road F.C.
- Mid Rhondda F.C.
- Montrose Roselea F.C.

== Other uses ==
- Media Resource Function controller, a component of the Media Resource Function, defined by the IP Multimedia Subsystem (IMS) standard
- Mixed reactant fuel cell, a type of Membraneless Fuel Cells
