= Notts, Lincs & Derbyshire/Leicestershire 1 West =

English rugby union league

- Current season or competition: 2003–04 Notts, Lincs & Derbyshire/Leicestershire 1 West
- Sport: Rugby union
- Instituted: 2000; 26 years ago
- Ceased: 2004; 22 years ago
- Number of teams: 10
- Country: England
- Holders: Ashfield (2nd title) (2003–04) (promoted to Midlands 4 East (North))
- Most titles: Ashfield (2 titles)

Notts, Lincs & Derbyshire/Leicestershire 1 West was a tier 9 English Rugby Union league with teams from Derbyshire, Nottinghamshire and the western region of Leicestershire taking part. (Note: Despite the name Notts, Lincs & Derbyshire, most Lincolnshire based teams would play in Notts, Lincs & Derbyshire/Leicestershire 1 East.) Promoted teams moved up to Midlands 4 East (North) and relegated teams dropped to Notts, Lincs & Derbyshire/Leicestershire 2 West.

The division was created in 2000, along with its counterpart Notts, Lincs & Derbyshire/Leicestershire 1 East, following the splitting of the East Midlands and Leicestershire leagues and the subsequent merging of the Leicestershire and Notts, Lincs & Derbyshire leagues. After four seasons the league was discontinued following further restructuring and the majority of teams moved into the newly created Notts, Lincs, Derbyshire/North Leicestershire and Derbyshire/North Leicestershire divisions.

== Original teams ==
When this division was introduced in 2000 it contained the following teams:

- Aylestone St James – promoted from East Midlands/Leicestershire 2 (champions)
- Bakewell Mannerians – transferred from Notts, Lincs & Derbyshire 1 (10th)
- Castle Donington – transferred from Notts, Lincs & Derbyshire 1 (11th)
- Dronfield – transferred from Notts, Lincs & Derbyshire 1 (15th)
- East Leake – promoted from Notts, Lincs & Derbyshire 2 (7th)
- Leesbrook – promoted from Notts, Lincs & Derbyshire 2 (10th)
- Melbourne – transferred from Notts, Lincs & Derbyshire 1 (9th)
- Nottingham Casuals – transferred from Notts, Lincs & Derbyshire 1 (6th)
- Old Newtonians – transferred from East Midlands/Leicestershire 1 (9th)
- Rolls-Royce – promoted from Notts, Lincs & Derbyshire 2 (8th)
- Tupton – promoted from Notts, Lincs & Derbyshire 2 (6th)

== Notts, Lincs & Derbyshire/Leicestershire 1 West honours ==
Notts, Lincs & Derbyshire/Leicestershire 1 West
Season	No of teams	Champions	Runners–up	Relegated teams	Reference
2000–01	11	Old Newtonians	Melbourne	Tupton, Rolls-Royce, Castle Donington	
2001–02	10	Ashfield	Nottingham Casuals	Aylestone St James, Leesbrook	
2002–03	11	East Leake	Amber Valley	Melbourne, Belper, Dronfield	
2003–04	10	Ashfield	Ashby (Note: League restructuring meant that all non-promoted teams were transferred to new divisions. Clubs ranked 2nd to 5th, Ashby (playoff losers), Antsey, Castle Donington and Nottingham Corsairs were transferred to Notts, Lincs, Derbyshire/North Leicestershire while Aylestonians (7th) would go into East Midlands/South Leicestershire 1.)	No relegation (Note: Although there was no relegation, Worksop (6th) would be transferred a level down into the new Nottinghamshire/Lincolnshire division, while Long Eaton (8th), Bakewell Mannerians (9th) and Leesbrook (10th) would go down into the new Derbyshire/North Leicestershire division.)	
Green backgrounds are the promotion places.

== Promotion play-offs ==
During the 2003–04 season there was a promotion playoff between the runners up of Notts, Lincs & Derbyshire/Leicestershire 1 East and Notts, Lincs & Derbyshire/Leicestershire 1 West for the third place to Midlands 4 East (North). The team with the superior league record has home advantage in the tie.

Notts, Lincs & Derbyshire/Leicestershire 1 (East v West)
Season	Home team	Score	Away team	Venue	Reference
2003–04	Southwell	39-14	Ashby	Park Lane, Southwell	

== Number of league titles ==
- Ashfield (2)
- East Leake (1)
- Old Newtonians (1)

== See also ==
- Notts, Lincs & Derbyshire/Leicestershire 1 East
- Notts, Lincs & Derbyshire/Leicestershire 2 East
- Notts, Lincs & Derbyshire/Leicestershire 2 West
- Midlands RFU
- Notts, Lincs & Derbyshire RFU
- Leicestershire RU
- English rugby union system
- Rugby union in England
