= Notts, Lincs & Derbyshire/Leicestershire 2 West =

Defunct English rugby union league

- Current season or competition: 2003–04 Notts, Lincs & Derbyshire/Leicestershire 2 West
- Sport: Rugby union
- Instituted: 2000; 26 years ago
- Ceased: 2004; 22 years ago
- Number of teams: 10
- Country: England
- Holders: Chesterfield Panthers (1st title) (2003–04) (promoted to Notts, Lincs, Derbyshire/North Leicestershire)
- Most titles: Multiple teams (1 title)

Notts, Lincs & Derbyshire/Leicestershire 2 West was a tier 10 English Rugby Union league with teams from Derbyshire, Nottinghamshire and the western region of Leicestershire taking part. (Note: Despite the name Notts, Lincs & Derbyshire, most Lincolnshire based teams would play in Notts, Lincs & Derbyshire/Leicestershire 2 East.) Promoted teams moved up to Notts, Lincs & Derbyshire/Leicestershire 1 West and there was no relegation.

The division was created in 2000, along with its counterpart Notts, Lincs & Derbyshire/Leicestershire 2 East, following the splitting of the East Midlands and Leicestershire leagues and the subsequent merging of the Leicestershire and Notts, Lincs & Derbyshire leagues. After four seasons the league was discontinued following further restructuring and teams moved into the newly created Notts, Lincs, Derbyshire/North Leicestershire, Derbyshire/North Leicestershire and East Midlands/South Leicestershire 2 divisions.

== Original teams ==
When this division was introduced in 2000 it contained the following teams:

- Ashby – transferred from East Midlands 2 (8th)
- Aylestonians – transferred from East Midlands 2 (5th)
- Chesterfield Panthers (2nd XV) (Note: 2nd team of Chesterfield Panthers RUFC.) – transferred from Notts, Lincs & Derbyshire 2 (15th)
- Hope Valley – transferred from Notts, Lincs & Derbyshire 2 (13th)
- Meden Vale – transferred from Notts, Lincs & Derbyshire 2 (14th)
- Ollerton – promoted from Notts, Lincs & Derbyshire 3 (runners up)
- University of Derby – promoted from Notts, Lincs & Derbyshire 3 (champions)

== Notts, Lincs & Derbyshire/Leicestershire 2 West honours ==
Notts, Lincs & Derbyshire/Leicestershire 2 West
Season	No of teams	Champions	Runners–up	Relegated teams	Reference
2000–01	7	Aylestonians	Ashby	No relegation	
2001–02	10	Castle Donington	East Leake	No relegation	
2002–03	10	Leesbrook	Boots Athletic	No relegation	
2003–04	10	Chesterfield Panthers (Note: League restructuring saw champions Chesterfield Panthers promoted into the newly introduced Notts, Lincs, Derbyshire/North Leicestershire.)	Dronfield (Note: As part of league restructuring runners up Dronfield who also be promoted into Notts, Lincs, Derbyshire/North Leicestershire. The rest of the clubs in the division were transferred into respective new level 10 leagues. Melbourne (3rd), University of Derby (4th), Belper (5th), Rolls-Royce (8th) and Tupton (10th) would go into Derbyshire/North Leicestershire, while Aylestone Athletic (6th) and Aylestone St James (7th) went into East Midlands/South Leicestershire 2.)	No relegation	
Green backgrounds are the promotion places.

== Number of league titles ==
- Aylestonians (1)
- Castle Donington (1)
- Chesterfield Panthers (1)
- Leesbrook (1)

== See also ==
- Notts, Lincs & Derbyshire/Leicestershire 1 East
- Notts, Lincs & Derbyshire/Leicestershire 1 West
- Notts, Lincs & Derbyshire/Leicestershire 2 East
- Midlands RFU
- Notts, Lincs & Derbyshire RFU
- Leicestershire RU
- English rugby union system
- Rugby union in England
