= Midlands 6 East (NW) =

English rugby union league

English Rugby Union Midland Division - Midlands 6 East (NW) is an English Rugby Union League.

Midlands 6 East (NW) is made up of teams from around the East Midlands of England who play home and away matches throughout a winter season. As with many low level they are often subject to re-structure

Promoted teams move up to Midlands 5 East (North). Teams that are second place at the end of the season go into a play off with the second placed team in Midlands 6 East (NE).

== 2008–09 season ==
2008–09 Midlands 6 East (NW)
Pos	Team	Pld	W	D	L	PF	PA	PD	Pts	Promotion
1	Uttoxeter (C, P)	14	12	0	2	560	75	+485	24	Promoted to Midlands 5 East (North) as champions
2	Dronfield (P)	14	11	1	2	417	179	+238	23	Promoted to Midlands 5 East (North) after winning playoff
3	Nottingham Boots Corsairs	14	11	0	3	436	127	+309	22	
4	Tupton	14	7	2	5	370	258	+112	14 (Note: 2 points deducted?)	
5	Long Eaton	14	6	0	8	223	283	−60	10	
6	All Spartans OB	14	2	2	10	134	403	−269	6	
7	University Of Derby	14	4	0	10	140	615	−475	6	
8	Meden Vale	14	0	1	13	121	461	−340	1	

(C) Champions; (P) Promoted

== 2007–08 season ==
2007–08 Midlands 6 East (NW)
Pos	Team	Pld	W	D	L	PF	PA	PD	Pts	Promotion
1	Belper (C, P)	18	15	0	3	628	113	+515	30	Promoted to Midlands 5 East (North) as champions
2	Leesbrook (P)	18	15	0	3	523	132	+391	30	Promoted to Midlands 5 East (North) after winning playoff
3	Uttoxeter	18	14	0	4	368	126	+242	28	
4	Keyworth	18	12	0	6	457	228	+229	24	
5	All Spartans OB	18	9	1	8	358	314	+44	19	
6	Tupton	18	7	2	9	306	446	−140	16	
7	Long Eaton	18	5	0	13	200	408	−208	10	
8	Meden Vale	18	4	1	13	213	451	−238	9	
9	Boots	18	4	0	14	153	644	−491	8	
10	Chesterfield	18	3	0	15	158	502	−344	6	

(C) Champions; (P) Promoted

== 2006–07 season ==
2006–07 Midlands 6 East (NW)
Pos	Team	Pld	W	D	L	PF	PA	PD	Pts	Promotion
1	Melbourne (C, P)	18	15	1	2	506	124	+382	31	Promoted to Midlands 5 East (North) as champions
2	Rolls Royce (P)	18	14	0	4	487	254	+233	28	Promoted to Midlands 5 East (North) after winning playoff
3	Belper	18	14	0	4	395	235	+160	28	
4	Uttoxeter	18	11	0	7	351	204	+147	22	
5	Buxton	18	10	1	7	347	180	+167	21	
6	Leesbrook	18	9	0	9	350	271	+79	18	
7	Tupton	18	7	0	11	276	335	−59	14	
8	All Spartans OB	18	5	0	13	146	523	−377	10	
9	Chesterfield	18	2	0	16	155	496	−341	4	
10	Meden Vale	18	2	0	16	160	551	−391	4	

(C) Champions; (P) Promoted

== See also ==
- English rugby union system
