= Notts, Lincs & Derbyshire 1 =

English rugby league

- Current season or competition: 1999–00 Notts, Lincs & Derbyshire 1
- Sport: Rugby union
- Instituted: 1987; 39 years ago
- Ceased: 2000; 26 years ago
- Number of teams: 15
- Country: England
- Holders: Mellish (1st title) (1999–00) (promoted to Midlands 4 East (North))
- Most titles: Chesterfield Panthers (2 titles)
- Website: NLD RFU

Notts, Lincs & Derbyshire 1 was a tier 9 English Rugby Union league with teams from Nottinghamshire, Lincolnshire and Derbyshire taking part. Promoted teams moved up to Midlands 4 East (North) (formerly Midlands East 2) and relegated teams dropped to Notts, Lincs & Derbyshire 2.

At the end of the 1999–00 season the Notts, Lincs & Derbyshire leagues were merged with the Leicestershire leagues. This meant that Notts, Lincs & Lincolnshire 1 was cancelled after 13 seasons and all non-promoted teams transferred into the newly introduced Notts, Lincs & Derbyshire/Leicestershire 1 East and Notts, Lincs & Derbyshire/Leicestershire 1 West divisions.

== Original teams ==
When league rugby began in 1987 this division contained the following teams:

- Boston
- Chesterfield Panthers
- Glossop
- Grimsby
- Kesteven
- Mellish
- Nottingham Moderns
- Scunthorpe
- Southwell
- West Bridgford
- Worksop

== Notts, Lincs & Derbyshire 1 honours ==
=== Notts, Lincs & Derbyshire 1 (1987–1992) ===
The original Notts, Lincs & Derbyshire 1 was a tier 7 league. Promotion was to Midlands 2 East and relegation to Notts, Lincs & Derbyshire 2.

Notts, Lincs & Derbyshire 1
Season	No of teams	Champions	Runners–up	Relegated teams	Reference
1987–88	11	Nottingham Moderns	Chesterfield Panthers	Grimsby, Boston	
1988–89	11	Scunthorpe	Southwell	Glossop	
1989–90	11	Chesterfield Panthers	Amber Valley	West Bridgford	
1990–91	11	Amber Valley	Spalding	East Retford, Worksop, Nottingham Casuals	
1991–92	11	Chesterfield Panthers (Note: League restructuring saw champions Chesterfield Panthers promoted into the newly introduced Midlands East 1.)	Spalding (Note: Restructuring saw the top five clubs, including West Bridgford, Mellish and Dronfield, promoted into the new Midlands East 1. Clubs ranked 6th to 10th - Glossop, Southwell, Stamford, Kesteven and Lincoln - went into the new Midlands East 2, with bottom club Sleaford the only team remaining in the division.)	No relegation (Note: Due to Midlands league restructuring there was no relegation.)	
Green backgrounds are promotion places.

=== Notts, Lincs & Derbyshire 1 (1992–1993) ===
Restructuring of the Midlands leagues saw Notts, Lincs & Derbyshire 1 drop two levels to become a tier 9 league. Promotion was to the newly introduced Midlands East 2, while relegation continued to Notts, Lincs & Derbyshire 2.

Notts, Lincs & Derbyshire 1
Season	No of teams	Champions	Runners–up	Relegated teams	Reference
1992–93	12	Grimsby	Ilkeston	Multiple teams (Note: Four teams were relegated including Nottinghamshire Constabulary, Nottinghamians, East Retford and All Spartans.)	
Green backgrounds are the promotion places.

=== Notts, Lincs & Derbyshire 1 (1993–1996) ===
The top six teams from Midlands 1 and the top six from North 1 were combined to create National 5 North, meaning that Notts, Lincs & Derbyshire 1 dropped another level to become a tier 10 league. Promotion continued to Midlands East 2 and relegation to Notts, Lincs & Derbyshire 2.

Notts, Lincs & Derbyshire 1
Season	No of teams	Champions	Runners–up	Relegated teams	Reference
1993–94	13	Ilkeston	Glossop	Meden Vale, Keyworth, Market Rasen & Louth	
1994–95	13	Ashbourne	Stamford	Dronfield, Bakewell Mannerians, Leesbrook	
1995–96	13	Long Eaton	Stamford (Note: The cancellation of National 5 North and subsequent restructuring meant that the top six clubs were promoted into Midlands East 2 including East Retford, Grimsby, Kesteven and Nottingham Casuals.)	No relegation (Note: Due to widespread league restructuring there was no relegation.)	
Green backgrounds are the promotion places.

=== Notts, Lincs & Derbyshire 1 (1996–2000) ===
At the end of the 1995–96 season National 5 North was discontinued and Notts, Lincs & Derbyshire 1 returned to being a tier 9 league. Promotion continued to Midlands East 2 and relegation to Notts, Lincs & Derbyshire 2. At the end of the 1999–00 season Notts, Lincs & Derbyshire 1 was cancelled due to Midlands league restructuring and non-promoted sides transferred into the newly introduced Notts, Lincs & Derbyshire/Leicestershire 1 East and Notts, Lincs & Derbyshire/Leicestershire 1 West.

Notts, Lincs & Derbyshire 1
Season	No of teams	Champions	Runners–up	Relegated teams	Reference
1996–97	17	Buxton	Dronfield	East Leake, North Kesteven, Boston	
1997–98	16	Glossop	Ashfield	Chesterfield Panthers, East Retford	
1998–99	15	Ashfield	Belper	Stamford College Old Boys, Leesbrook	(Note: 1998–99 Notts, Lincs & Derbyshire 1 mistakenly referred to as NLD/Leics 1 East on RFU website.)
1999–00	15	Mellish (Note: Champions Mellish were promoted to the newly introduced Midlands 4 East (North).)	Sleaford (Note: League restructuring meant that the top four teams were promoted. Runners up Sleaford went up to the new Midlands 4 East (South), while Market Rasen & Louth and Worksop went up to Midlands 4 East (North). The rest of the sides in the division were transferred into the newly introduced Notts, Lincs & Derbyshire/Leicestershire 1 East and Notts, Lincs & Derbyshire/Leicestershire 1 West divisions.)	No relegation (Note: The merger of the Notts, Lincs & Derbyshire and Leicestershire leagues meant there was no relegation.)	(Note: 1999–00 Notts, Lincs & Derbyshire 1 mistakenly referred to as NLD/Leics 1 East on RFU website.)
Green backgrounds are the promotion places.

== Number of league titles ==
- Chesterfield Panthers (2)
- Amber Valley (1)
- Ashbourne (1)
- Ashfield (1)
- Buxton (1)
- Glossop (1)
- Grimsby (1)
- Ilkeston (1)
- Long Eaton (1)
- Mellish (1)
- Nottingham Moderns (1)
- Scunthorpe (1)

== See also ==
- Notts, Lincs & Derbyshire 2
- Notts, Lincs & Derbyshire 3
- Notts, Lincs & Derbyshire 4
- Notts, Lincs & Derbyshire 5
- Midlands RFU
- Notts, Lincs & Derbyshire RFU
- English rugby union system
- Rugby union in England
