= Notts, Lincs & Derbyshire Rugby Football Union =

(England) Notts, Lincs & Derbyshire RFU
- Full name: Nottinghamshire, Lincolnshire and Derbyshire Rugby Football Union
- Founded: 1926; 99 years ago
- Region: Nottinghamshire, Lincolnshire, Derbyshire
- Chairman: David Chamberlin
- President: Mason Cole
Team kit

Official website
- nldrfu.co.uk

The Nottinghamshire, Lincolnshire & Derbyshire Rugby Football Union (NLD RFU) is a governing body for rugby union in part of The Midlands, England. The union is the constituent body of the Rugby Football Union for the counties of Nottinghamshire and Lincolnshire and Derbyshire, with each county also having its own sub-unions with additional club cup competitions. As well as overseeing club rugby, the Notts, Lincs and Derbyshire RFU also administers the county representative teams.

== History ==
The Notts, Lincs & Derbyshire Rugby Football Union was formed in 1926. Prior to this clubs in the region had been members of the Midland Counties Football Union which had dissolved several years earlier in 1920.

== County team ==
The Notts, Lincs & Derbyshire senior men's side currently play in the third division of County Championship rugby union. They reached their first County Championship final in 1986, losing 12-9 to Middlesex at Twickenham Stadium, back when it was still a single competition. They had to wait another 20 years for another Twickenham final, finally winning their first county silverware in 2006 when they defeated Oxfordshire 21 - 17 to claim the County Championship Shield. In recent years the team has struggled, at one point even having to drop out of the 2018 County Championship Shield, before returning for the 2019 competition.

=== Honours ===
- County Championship Shield winners: 2006

== Affiliated clubs ==
There are 60 clubs currently affiliated to NLD RFU, listed below. Source:
Nottinghamshire

- Ashfield
- Bingham
- East Leeke
- East Retford
- Keyworth
- Mansfield
- Mansfield Woodhouse
- Meden Vale
- Mellish
- Newark
- Nottingham
- Nottingham Casuals
- Nottingham Corsairs
- Nottingham Moderns
- Nottingham Trent University
- Nottinghamians
- Ollerton
- Paviors
- Southwell
- Sutton Bonnington Agricultural College
- University of Nottingham
- West Bridgford
- Worksop

Lincolnshire

- Barton and District
- Boston
- Bourne
- Cleethorpes
- Gainsborough
- Grimsby
- Horncastle
- Kesteven
- Lincoln
- Lincolnshire Police
- Market Rasen & Louth
- North Hykeham
- Scunthorpe
- Skegness
- Sleaford
- Spalding
- Stamford College Old Boys
- Stamford
- University of Lincoln

Derbyshire

- Amber Valley
- Ashbourne
- Bakewell Mannerians
- Belper
- Buxton
- Castle Donington
- Chesterfield Panthers
- Derby
- Derbyshire Constabulary
- Dronfield
- Glossop
- Hope Valley
- Ilkeston
- Leesbrook
- Long Eaton
- Matlock
- Melbourne
- Rolls Royce
- Tupton

== Notts, Lincs & Derbyshire club competitions ==
The Notts, Lincs & Derbyshire currently run the following competitions for club sides in the region:

=== Cups ===
- Notts, Lincs & Derbyshire Senior Cup
- Notts, Lincs & Derbyshire Senior Shield
- Notts, Lincs & Derbyshire Senior Plate
- Notts, Lincs & Derbyshire Senior Vase

=== Discontinued competitions ===
- Midlands 5 East (North) – tier 10 league that ran between 2006 and 2018
- Notts, Lincs & Derbyshire 1 – tier 7-9 league that ran between 1987 and 2000
- Notts, Lincs & Derbyshire 2 – tier 8-10 league that ran between 1987 and 2000
- Notts, Lincs & Derbyshire 3 – tier 9-11 league that ran between 1987 and 2000
- Notts, Lincs & Derbyshire 4 – tier 10-13 league that ran between 1987 and 1996
- Notts, Lincs & Derbyshire 5 – tier 11 league that ran between 1990 and 1992
- Notts, Lincs & Derbyshire/Leicestershire 1 East – tier 9 league for Notts, Lincs and east Leicestershire clubs that ran between 2000 and 2004
- Notts, Lincs & Derbyshire/Leicestershire 1 West – tier 9 league for Notts, Derbyshire and west Leicestershire clubs that ran between 2000 and 2004
- Notts, Lincs & Derbyshire/Leicestershire 2 East – tier 10 league for Notts, Lincs and east Leicestershire clubs that ran between 2000 and 2004
- Notts, Lincs & Derbyshire/Leicestershire 2 West – tier 10 league for Notts, Derbyshire and west Leicestershire clubs that ran between 2000 and 2004

== Sub-union club competitions ==
Additionally, the Nottinghamshire, Lincolnshire and Derbyshire rugby football unions run their own competitions alongside the main NLD cups.

=== Nottinghamshire ===
- Nottinghamshire Senior Cup
- Nottinghamshire Intermediate Cup
- Nottinghamshire Junior Cup

=== Lincolnshire ===
- Lincolnshire Senior Cup
- Lincolnshire Intermediate Cup

=== Derbyshire ===
- Derbyshire 1st XV Cup
- Derbyshire 1st XV Shield
- Derbyshire 2nd XV Cup
- Derbyshire Presidents Trophy
- Derbyshire Pennant

== See also ==
- Midland Division
- English rugby union system
