= Notts, Lincs & Derbyshire 3 =

English rugby union league

- Current season or competition: 1999–00 Notts, Lincs & Derbyshire 3
- Sport: Rugby union
- Instituted: 1987; 39 years ago
- Ceased: 2000; 26 years ago
- Number of teams: 10
- Country: England
- Holders: University Of Derby (1st title) (1999–00) (transferred to Notts, Lincs & Derbyshire/Leicestershire 2 East)
- Most titles: Multiple teams (1 title)
- Website: NLD RFU

Notts, Lincs & Derbyshire 3 was a tier 11 English Rugby Union league with teams from Nottinghamshire, Lincolnshire and Derbyshire taking part. Promoted teams moved up to Notts, Lincs & Derbyshire 2 and since the cancellation of Notts, Lincs & Derbyshire 4 at the end of the 1995–96 season there was no relegation.

At the end of the 1999–00 campaign the Notts, Lincs & Derbyshire leagues were merged with the Leicestershire leagues. This meant that Notts, Lincs & Lincolnshire 3 was cancelled after 13 seasons and all teams transferred into the new Notts, Lincs & Derbyshire/Leicestershire leagues.

== Original teams ==
When league rugby began in 1987 this division contained the following teams:

- All Spartans (Note: All Spartans would later merge with Ashfield Swans in 1997 to form Ashfield RUFC.)
- Ashfield Swans (Note: Ashfield Swans would later merge with All Spartans in 1997 to form Ashfield RUFC.)
- Bakewell Mannerians
- Belper
- Bingham
- Boots Athletic (Note: Boots Athletic RFC would later merge with Nottingham Community Rugby in 2008 to form Nottingham Corsairs RFC.)
- Gainsborough
- Long Eaton
- North Kesteven Old Boys (Note: North Kesteven Old Boys RUFC would be renamed as North Hykeham RUFC in 2007.)
- Rolls Royce
- Skegness

== Notts, Lincs & Derbyshire 3 honours ==
=== Notts, Lincs & Derbyshire 3 (1987–1990) ===
The original Notts, Lincs & Derbyshire 3 was a tier 9 league. Promotion was to Notts, Lincs & Derbyshire 2 and relegation was to either Notts, Lincs & Derbyshire 4 East or Notts, Lincs & Derbyshire 4 West.

Notts, Lincs & Derbyshire 3
Season	No of teams	Champions	Runners–up	Relegated teams	Reference
1987–88	11	All Spartans	Long Eaton	Bingham, Bakewell Mannerians	
1988–89	11	Dronfield	Nottinghamshire Constabulary	Gainsborough	
1989–90	11	Belper	Melbourne	Skegness	
Green backgrounds are promotion places.

=== Notts, Lincs & Derbyshire 3 (1990–1992) ===
Notts, Lincs & Derbyshire 3 continued as a tier 9 league with promotion to Notts, Lincs & Derbyshire 2. However, restructuring due to the introduction of Notts, Lincs & Derbyshire 5 meant that relegation was now to a single Notts, Lincs & Derbyshire 4 division.

Notts, Lincs & Derbyshire 3
Season	No of teams	Champions	Runners–up	Relegated teams	Reference
1990–91	11	Ashbourne	Ilkeston	Boston, Barton & District	
1991–92	11	Bakewell Mannerians (Note: Restructuring saw champions Bakewell Mannerians promoted two levels up into Notts, Lincs & Derbyshire 1.)	Grimsby (Note: Restructuring saw runners up Grimsby also promoted two levels up into Notts, Lincs & Derbyshire 1. The rest of the clubs in the division were promoted into Notts, Lincs & Derbyshire 2.)	No relegation (Note: As restructuring meant that all clubs in the division were promoted there was no relegation.)	
Green backgrounds are promotion places.

=== Notts, Lincs & Derbyshire 3 (1992–1993) ===
Restructuring of the Midlands leagues saw Notts, Lincs & Derbyshire 3 drop two levels to become a tier 11 league. Promotion continued to Notts, Lincs & Derbyshire 2 and relegation to Notts, Lincs & Derbyshire 4.

Notts, Lincs & Derbyshire 3
Season	No of teams	Champions	Runners–up	Relegated teams	Reference
1992–93	12	Bingham	Stamford College	Rainworth, Bolsover, Yarborough Bees	
Green backgrounds are the promotion places.

=== Notts, Lincs & Derbyshire 3 (1993–1996) ===
The top six teams from Midlands 1 and the top six from North 1 were combined to create National 5 North, meaning that Notts, Lincs & Derbyshire 3 dropped another level to become a tier 12 league. Promotion continued to Notts, Lincs & Derbyshire 2 and relegation to Notts, Lincs & Derbyshire 4.

Notts, Lincs & Derbyshire 3
Season	No of teams	Champions	Runners–up	Relegated teams	Reference
1993–94	13	North Kesteven	Barton & District	Hope Valley, Cleethorpes, Bourne	
1994–95	13	Castle Donington	Boots Athletic	Gainsborough, Bolsover, Skegness	
1995–96	12	Stamford College	Cotgrave (Note: Due to the cancellation of National 5 North subsequent restructuring meant that ten clubs were promoted to Notts, Lincs & Derbyshire 2 including Nottinghamians, Belper, Meden Vale, Barton & District, Cleethorpes, University of Derby, Ollerton and Yarborough Bees.)	No relegation	
Green backgrounds are the promotion places.

=== Notts, Lincs & Derbyshire 3 (1996–2000) ===
At the end of the 1995–96 season National 5 North was discontinued and Notts, Lincs & Derbyshire 3 returned to being a tier 11 league. Promotion continued to Notts, Lincs & Derbyshire 2 while the cancellation of Notts, Lincs & Derbyshire 4 meant that there was no relegation. At the end of the 1999–00 season Notts, Lincs & Derbyshire 3 was cancelled due to Midlands league restructuring and teams transferred into the new Notts, Lincs & Derbyshire/Leicestershire leagues.

Notts, Lincs & Derbyshire 3
Season	No of teams	Champions	Runners–up	Relegated teams	Reference
1996–97	7	Hope Valley	Gainsborough	No relegation	
1997–98	7	Cleethorpes	Skegness	No relegation	
1998–99	10	Bolsover	Tupton	No relegation	(Note: 1998–99 Notts, Lincs & Derbyshire 2 mistakenly referred to as NLD/Leics 2 East on RFU website.)
1999–00	10	University of Derby (Note: Restructuring would see champions University of Derby transferred to Notts, Lincs & Derbyshire/Leicestershire 2 East.)	Ollerton (Note: The merging of Notts, Lincs & Derbyshire and Leicestershire leagues would see all teams transferred into the equivalent new divisions. Ollerton would join Notts, Lincs & Derbyshire/Leicestershire 2 East while the rest of the clubs in the division would join Notts, Lincs & Derbyshire/Leicestershire 2 West.)	No relegation	(Note: 1999–00 Notts, Lincs & Derbyshire 2 mistakenly referred to as NLD/Leics 1 West on RFU website.)
Green backgrounds are the promotion places.

== Number of league titles ==
- All Spartans (1)
- Ashbourne (1)
- Bakewell Mannerians (1)
- Belper (1)
- Bingham (1)
- Bolsover (1)
- Castle Donington (1)
- Cleethorpes (1)
- Dronfield (1)
- Hope Valley (1)
- North Kesteven (1)
- Stamford College (1)
- University of Derby (1)

== See also ==
- Notts, Lincs & Derbyshire 1
- Notts, Lincs & Derbyshire 2
- Notts, Lincs & Derbyshire 4
- Notts, Lincs & Derbyshire 5
- Midlands RFU
- Notts, Lincs & Derbyshire RFU
- English rugby union system
- Rugby union in England
