= Notts, Lincs & Derbyshire/Leicestershire 1 East =

- Current season or competition: 2003–04 Notts, Lincs & Derbyshire/Leicestershire 1 East
- Sport: Rugby union
- Instituted: 2000; 25 years ago
- Ceased: 2004; 21 years ago
- Number of teams: 9
- Country: England
- Holders: Oakham (2nd title) (2003–04) (promoted to Midlands 4 East (North))
- Most titles: Oakham (2 titles)

Notts, Lincs & Derbyshire/Leicestershire 1 East was a tier 9 division in the English rugby union system with teams from Nottinghamshire, Lincolnshire and the eastern region of Leicestershire taking part. (Note: Despite the name Notts, Lincs & Derbyshire, most Derbyshire based teams would play in Notts, Lincs & Derbyshire/Leicestershire 1 West.) Promoted teams moved up to Midlands 4 East (North) and relegated teams dropped to Notts, Lincs & Derbyshire/Leicestershire 2 East.

The division was created in 2000, along with its counterpart Notts, Lincs & Derbyshire/Leicestershire 1 West, following the splitting of the East Midlands and Leicestershire leagues and the subsequent merging of the Leicestershire and Notts, Lincs & Derbyshire leagues. After four seasons the league was discontinued following further restructuring and the majority of teams moved into the newly created Notts, Lincs, Derbyshire/North Leicestershire and Nottinghamshire/Lincolnshire divisions.

== Original teams ==
When this division was introduced in 2000 it contained the following teams:

- Barton & District – transferred from Notts, Lincs & Derbyshire 1 (14th)
- Boots Athletic (Note: Boots Athletic RFC would later merge with Nottingham Community Rugby in 2008 to form Nottingham Corsairs RFC.) – transferred from Notts, Lincs & Derbyshire 1 (12th)
- Boston – promoted from Notts, Lincs & Derbyshire 2 (runners-up)
- Cleethorpes – promoted from Notts, Lincs & Derbyshire 2 (5th)
- Cotgrave – promoted from Notts, Lincs & Derbyshire 2 (3rd)
- East Retford – promoted from Notts, Lincs & Derbyshire 2 (champions)
- Keyworth – transferred from Notts, Lincs & Derbyshire 1 (7th)
- Nottinghamians – transferred from Notts, Lincs & Derbyshire 1 (8th)
- Oakham – transferred from East Midlands 1 (4th)
- Southwell – transferred from Notts, Lincs & Derbyshire 1 (13th)

== Notts, Lincs & Derbyshire/Leicestershire 1 East honours ==
Notts, Lincs & Derbyshire/Leicestershire 1 East
Season	No. of teams	Champions	Runners–up	Relegated teams	Reference
2000–01	10	Oakham	East Retford	Cleethorpes, Barton & District, Cotgrave (Note: Cotgrave were relegated to Notts, Lincs & Derbyshire/Leicestershire 2 West.)	
2001–02	10	Mellish	West Bridgford	North Kesteven, Skegness, Sleaford	
2002–03	9	East Retford	Stamford	No relegation	
2003–04	9	Oakham	Southwell (Note: Playoff winners Southwell joined the champions Oakham in Midlands 4 East (North). All other teams were transferred out of the league due to restructuring; the teams ranked 3rd to 5th (Keyworth, Sleaford and Stamford) joined Notts, Lincs, Derbyshire/North Leicestershire, while those ranked 6th to 9th (Boston, Stamford College Old Boys, Skegness and Nottinghamians) joining Nottinghamshire/Lincolnshire.)	No relegation (Note: League restructuring meant there was no relegation.)	
Green backgrounds are the promotion places.

== Promotion play-offs ==
After the 2003–04 season, there was a promotion play-off between the runners-up of Notts, Lincs & Derbyshire/Leicestershire 1 East and Notts, Lincs & Derbyshire/Leicestershire 1 West for the third place to Midlands 4 East (North). The team with the superior league record had home advantage in the tie.

Notts, Lincs & Derbyshire/Leicestershire 1 (East v West)
Season	Home team	Score	Away team	Venue	Reference
2003–04	Southwell	39–14	Ashby	Park Lane, Southwell	

== Number of league titles ==
- Oakham (2)
- East Retford (1)
- Mellish (1)

== See also ==
- Notts, Lincs & Derbyshire/Leicestershire 1 West
- Notts, Lincs & Derbyshire/Leicestershire 2 East
- Notts, Lincs & Derbyshire/Leicestershire 2 West
- Midlands RFU
- Notts, Lincs & Derbyshire RFU
- Leicestershire RU
- English rugby union system
- Rugby union in England
