= Notts, Lincs & Derbyshire 2 =

English rugby union league

- Current season or competition: 1999–00 Notts, Lincs & Derbyshire 2
- Sport: Rugby union
- Instituted: 1987; 39 years ago
- Ceased: 2000; 26 years ago
- Number of teams: 15
- Country: England
- Holders: East Retford (1st title) (1999–00) (transferred to Notts, Lincs & Derbyshire/Leicestershire 1 East)
- Most titles: Multiple teams (1 title)
- Website: NLD RFU

Notts, Lincs & Derbyshire 2 was a tier 10 English Rugby Union league with teams from Nottinghamshire, Lincolnshire and Derbyshire taking part. Promoted teams moved up to Notts, Lincs & Derbyshire 1 and relegated teams dropped to Notts, Lincs & Derbyshire 3.

At the end of the 1999–00 season the Notts, Lincs & Derbyshire leagues were merged with the Leicestershire leagues. This meant that Notts, Lincs & Lincolnshire 2 was cancelled after 13 seasons and all teams transferred into the new Notts, Lincs & Derbyshire/Leicestershire leagues.

== Original teams ==
When league rugby began in 1987 this division contained the following teams:

- Amber Valley
- Dronfield
- East Retford
- Ilkeston
- Keyworth
- Market Rasen & Louth
- Nottingham Casuals
- Nottinghamshire Constabulary
- Nottinghamians
- Sleaford
- Spalding

== Notts, Lincs & Derbyshire 2 honours ==
=== Notts, Lincs & Derbyshire 2 (1987–1992) ===
The original Notts, Lincs & Derbyshire 2 was a tier 8 league. Promotion was to Notts, Lincs & Derbyshire 1 and relegation to Notts, Lincs & Derbyshire 3.

Notts, Lincs & Derbyshire 2
Season	No of teams	Champions	Runners–up	Relegated teams	Reference
1987–88	11	Amber Valley	East Retford	Nottinghamshire Constabulary, Dronfield	
1988–89	11	Sleaford	Spalding	Boston	
1989–90	11	Glossop	Nottingham Casuals	Ilkeston	
1990–91	11	Dronfield	West Bridgford	Belper, Melbourne, Grimsby	
1991–92	11	Worksop (Note: League restructuring saw champions Worksop promoted into the new Midlands East 2.)	Market Rasen & Louth (Note: Market Rasen & Louth were also promoted into Midlands East 2. All other teams in the division were promoted into Notts, Lincs & Derbyshire 1.)	No relegation (Note: As all teams were promoted from the division due to restructuring there was no relegation.)	
Green backgrounds are promotion places.

=== Notts, Lincs & Derbyshire 2 (1992–1993) ===
Restructuring of the Midlands leagues saw Notts, Lincs & Derbyshire 2 drop two levels to become a tier 10 league. Promotion continued to Notts, Lincs & Derbyshire 1 and relegation to Notts, Lincs & Derbyshire 3.

Notts, Lincs & Derbyshire 2
Season	No of teams	Champions	Runners–up	Relegated teams	Reference
1992–93	13	East Leake	Meden Vale	Cleethorpes, Tupton, Belper, North Kesteven	
Green backgrounds are the promotion places.

=== Notts, Lincs & Derbyshire 2 (1993–1996) ===
The top six teams from Midlands 1 and the top six from North 1 were combined to create National 5 North, meaning that Notts, Lincs & Derbyshire 2 dropped another level to become a tier 11 league. Promotion continued to Notts, Lincs & Derbyshire 1 and relegation to Notts, Lincs & Derbyshire 3.

Notts, Lincs & Derbyshire 2
Season	No of teams	Champions	Runners–up	Relegated teams	Reference
1993–94	13	Leesbrook	Melbourne	Stamford College, Nottinghamians, Boots Athletic	
1994–95	13	Buxton	East Retford	Meden Vale, Barton & District, Bingham	
1995–96	13	Bakewell Mannerians	Keyworth (Note: The cancellation of National 5 North and subsequent restructuring meant that the top ten clubs were promoted into Notts, Lincs & Derbyshire 1 including Market Rasen & Louth, Leesbrook, Dronfield, Castle Donington, Ashfield Swans, All Spartans, Boston and North Kesteven.)	No relegation (Note: Restructuring of the Midlands leagues meant there was no relegation.)	
Green backgrounds are the promotion places.

=== Notts, Lincs & Derbyshire 2 (1996–2000) ===
At the end of the 1995–96 season National 5 North was discontinued and Notts, Lincs & Derbyshire 2 returned to being a tier 10 league. Promotion continued to Notts, Lincs & Derbyshire 1 and relegation to Notts, Lincs & Derbyshire 3. At the end of the 1999–00 season Notts, Lincs & Derbyshire 2 was cancelled due to Midlands league restructuring and teams transferred into the new Notts, Lincs & Derbyshire/Leicestershire leagues.

Notts, Lincs & Derbyshire 2
Season	No of teams	Champions	Runners–up	Relegated teams	Reference
1996–97	14	Boots Athletic	Stamford College	University of Derby, Cleethorpes, Yarborough Bees	
1997–98	10	Belper	Sleaford	Gainsborough, Ollerton	
1998–99	14	Barton & District	Nottinghamians	Bourne	(Note: 1998–99 Notts, Lincs & Derbyshire 2 mistakenly referred to as NLD/Leics 2 East on RFU website.)
1999–00	15	East Retford (Note: Restructuring would see champions Eastford transferred to Notts, Lincs & Derbyshire/Leicestershire 1 East.)	Boston (Note: The merging of Notts, Lincs & Derbyshire and Leicestershire leagues would see all teams transferred into the equivalent new divisions. Boston (2nd), Cotgrave (3rd) and Cleethorpes (5th) would join Notts, Lincs & Derbyshire/Leicestershire 1 East, while Tupton (6th), East Leake (7th), Rolls Royce (8th) and Leesbrook (10th) would join Notts, Lincs & Derbyshire/Leicestershire 1 West. Skegness (9th) and Stamford College would join Notts, Lincs & Derbyshire/Leicestershire 2 East and Hope Valley (13th), Meden Vale (14th) and Chestefield Panthers (15th) would join Notts, Lincs & Derbyshire/Leicestershire 2 East.)	No relegation	(Note: 1999–00 Notts, Lincs & Derbyshire 2 mistakenly referred to as NLD/Leics 2 East on RFU website.)
Green backgrounds are the promotion places.

== Number of league titles ==
- Amber Valley (1)
- Bakewell Mannerians (1)
- Barton & District (1)
- Belper (1)
- Boots Athletic (1)
- Buxton (1)
- Dronfield (1)
- East Leake (1)
- East Retford (1)
- Glossop (1)
- Leesbrook (1)
- Sleaford (1)
- Worksop (1)

== See also ==
- Notts, Lincs & Derbyshire 1
- Notts, Lincs & Derbyshire 3
- Notts, Lincs & Derbyshire 4
- Notts, Lincs & Derbyshire 5
- Midlands RFU
- Notts, Lincs & Derbyshire RFU
- English rugby union system
- Rugby union in England
