= Notts, Lincs & Derbyshire 5 =

English rugby union league

- Current season or competition: 1991–92 Notts, Lincs & Derbyshire 5
- Sport: Rugby union
- Instituted: 1990; 36 years ago
- Ceased: 1992; 34 years ago
- Number of teams: 10
- Country: England
- Holders: Stamford College (1st title) (1991–92) (promoted to Notts, Lincs & Derbyshire 2 (Note: Typically promotion was to Notts, Lincs & Derbyshire 4 but due to restructuring champions Stamford College were promoted two levels up.))
- Most titles: Derby College, Stamford College (1 title)
- Website: NLD RFU

Notts, Lincs & Derbyshire 5 was a short lived tier 11 English Rugby Union league with teams from Nottinghamshire, Lincolnshire and Derbyshire taking part. Promoted teams moved up to Notts, Lincs & Derbyshire 4 and there was no relegation. The division was cancelled at the end of the 1991–92 season and the majority of teams transferred into Notts, Lincs & Derbyshire 4.

== Original teams ==
When this division was introduced in 1990 it contained the following teams:

- Bolsover (Note: Bolsover would be renamed as North Derbyshire RUFC in 2001.)
- Derby College
- Leesbrook
- Monson
- Rainworth
- Stamford College
- Whitwell
- Yarborough Bees

== Notts, Lincs & Derbyshire 5 honours ==
Notts, Lincs & Derbyshire 5
Season	No of teams	Champions	Runners–up	Relegated teams	Reference
1990–91	8	Derby College	Leesbrook	No relegation	
1991–92	10	Stamford College (Note: Restructuring saw champions Stamford College promoted two levels up into Notts, Lincs & Derbyshire 3.)	Hope Valley (Note: Restructuring meant that the top six clubs including Bolsover, Yarborough Bees, Gainsborough and Rainworth were promoted into Notts, Lincs & Derbyshire 3. All other clubs were promoted up into Notts, Lincs & Derbyshire 4.)	No relegation	
Green backgrounds are promotion places.

== Number of league titles ==
- Derby College (1)
- Stamford College (1)

== See also ==
- Notts, Lincs & Derbyshire 1
- Notts, Lincs & Derbyshire 2
- Notts, Lincs & Derbyshire 3
- Notts, Lincs & Derbyshire 4
- Midlands RFU
- Notts, Lincs & Derbyshire RFU
- English rugby union system
- Rugby union in England
