= Will Allman =

English rugby union player

- Born: William Allman; 3 May 1997 (age 29) Derby, England
- Height: 1.85 m (6 ft 1 in)
- Weight: 91 kg (14 st 5 lb; 201 lb)
- School: Trent College
- University: Loughborough University

Rugby union career
- Position: Flanker
- Current team: Northampton Saints
Senior career
Years	Team	Apps	(Points)
2015 -	Northampton Saints	0	(0)

William Allman (born 3 May 1997) is an English professional rugby union player currently playing for the Aviva Premiership side Northampton Saints. He plays at Flanker. His head size is roughly 1.7 times the size of an average male.

== Background ==
Allman began playing rugby at age 6 with Melbourne RFC working his way up the clubs mini and junior levels. He quickly developed into a fine young player playing for county, region and then England south in 2013. Educated at Trent College, Allman and his team mates played Exeter College in the NatWest Schools Cup final, narrowly defeating them 17-16 and claiming the trophy.

Allman's Grandfather, John captained Sale RFC in 1960's.

He is currently studying economics at Loughborough University.

== Club career ==
In 2015 Northampton Saints confirmed that Allman would make the step up from the junior academy to the senior academy, awarded a professional contract for the 2015/16 season.

Returning from a long term injury, he helped Northampton Wanderers lift the A League trophy beating Gloucester United 36-15 in 2017.

Allman is yet to break into the Northampton senior team and is currently dual registered with Nottingham R.F.C.

== International career ==
Allman earned himself a call up to the England under-18s squad under John Fletcher. He quickly impressed, featuring in all six fixtures of European Championship campaign and scoring a try their thrilling 82-8 win over Portugal. He subsequently joined the team on their three fixture tour of South Africa.
