= Midlands 6 East (S) =

English rugby union league

English Rugby Union Midland Division - Midlands 6 East (S) is an English Rugby Union League.

Midlands 6 East (S) is made up of teams from around the East Midlands of England who play home and away matches throughout a winter season. As with many low level they are often subject to re-structure.

Promoted teams move up to Midlands 5 East (South).

== Teams 2008-2009 ==
- Anstey RUFC
- Stamford RUFC
- Stamford College O.B. RUFC
- St. Ives RUFC
- St Neots RUFC
- Thorney
- Westwood RUFC

== Teams 2007-2008 ==
- Anstey RUFC
- Aylestonians RUFC
- Kempston RUFC
- March Bears RUFC
- Stamford College O.B. RUFC
- St Neots RUFC
- Thorney
- Wellingborough O.G. RUFC

== See also ==
- English rugby union system
