= Notts, Lincs & Derbyshire 4 =

English rugby union league

- Sport: Rugby union
- Instituted: 1987; 39 years ago
- Ceased: 1996; 30 years ago
- Number of teams: 10
- Country: England
- Holders: Bourne (1st title) (1995–96) (promoted to Notts, Lincs & Derbyshire 2 (Note: Typically promotion was to Notts, Lincs & Derbyshire 3 but due to restructuring champions Bourne were promoted two levels up.))
- Most titles: Cleethorpes (2 titles)
- Website: NLD RFU

Notts, Lincs & Derbyshire 4 was a tier 13 English Rugby Union league with teams from Nottinghamshire, Lincolnshire and Derbyshire taking part. Promoted teams moved up to Notts, Lincs & Derbyshire 3 and since the cancellation of Notts, Lincs & Derbyshire 5 at the end of the 1991–92 season there was no relegation. Notts, Lincs & Derbyshire 4 was cancelled at the end of the 1995–96 campaign and the majority of teams transferred into Notts, Lincs & Derbyshire 3.

== Original teams ==
When league rugby began in 1987 this division was divided into two regional divisions - east & west - containing the following teams:

=== Notts, Lincs & Derbyshire 4 East ===
- Barton & District
- Bourne
- Cleethorpes
- Harworth College
- Horncastle
- Meden Valley
- Ollerton
- Rainworth
- Yarborough

=== Notts, Lincs & Derbyshire 4 West ===
- Ashbourne
- Bolsover (Note: Bolsover would be renamed as North Derbyshire RUFC in 2001.)
- Buxton
- East Leake
- Hope Valley
- Leesbrook
- Melbourne
- Tupton
- Whitwell

== Notts, Lincs & Derbyshire 4 honours ==
=== Notts, Lincs & Derbyshire 4 East / West (1987–1990) ===
The original Notts, Lincs & Derbyshire 4 was divided into two tier 10 divisions - East and West. Promotion was to Notts, Lincs & Derbyshire 3 and there was no relegation until Notts, Lincs & Derbyshire 5 was introduced ahead of the 1990–91 season.

Notts, Lincs & Derbyshire 4 East / West
Season	No. of teams	Champions	Runners–up	Relegated teams	League name	Reference
1987–88	9	Barton & District	Meden Vale	No relegation	Notts, Lincs & Derbyshire 4 East	
1987–88	9	Ashbourne	Hope Valley	No relegation	Notts, Lincs & Derbyshire 4 West	
1988–89	9	Cleethorpes	Bingham	No relegation	Notts, Lincs & Derbyshire 4 East	
1988–89	8	Melbourne	Hope Valley	No relegation	Notts, Lincs & Derbyshire 4 West	
1989–90	8	Bingham	Gainsborough	Yarborough Bees	Notts, Lincs & Derbyshire 4 East	
1989–90	8	East Leake (Note: Champions East Leake were not promoted due to restructuring leading to Notts, Lincs & Derbyshire 4 becoming a single division.)	Tupton	Bolsover, Leesbrook, Rainworth	Notts, Lincs & Derbyshire 4 West	
Green backgrounds are promotion places.

=== Notts, Lincs & Derbyshire 4 (1990–1992) ===
For the 1990–91 season Notts, Lincs & Derbyshire 4 was restructured became a single tier 10 league. Promotion continued to Notts, Lincs & Derbyshire 3 and relegation was now to the newly introduced Notts, Lincs & Derbyshire 5.

Notts, Lincs & Derbyshire 4
Season	No. of teams	Champions	Runners–up	Relegated teams	Reference
1990–91	11	Bakewell Mannerians	East Leake	Horncastle, Hope Valley, Gainsborough	
1991–92	11	Leesbrook (Note: Restructuring saw champions Leesbrook promoted two levels up into Notts, Lincs & Derbyshire 2.)	Meden Vale (Note: Restructuring meant that the top four clubs including Boston and Buxton were promoted two levels up into Notts, Lincs & Derbyshire 2. All of clubs in the division were promoted up to Notts, Lincs & Derbyshire 3.)	No relegation (Note: The cancellation of Notts, Lincs & Derbyshire 5 at the end of the season, combined with the promotion of all clubs in the division, meant there was no relegation.)	
Green backgrounds are promotion places.

=== Notts, Lincs & Derbyshire 4 (1992–1993) ===
Restructuring of the Midlands leagues saw Notts, Lincs & Derbyshire 4 drop two levels to become a tier 12 league. Promotion continued to Notts, Lincs & Derbyshire 2 and the cancellation Notts, Lincs & Derbyshire 5 meant there was no longer relegation.

Notts, Lincs & Derbyshire 4
Season	No. of teams	Champions	Runners–up	Relegated teams	Reference
1992–93	6	Cotgrave	Horncastle	No relegation	
Green backgrounds are the promotion places.

=== Notts, Lincs & Derbyshire 4 (1993–1996) ===
The top six teams from Midlands 1 and the top six from North 1 were combined to create National 5 North, meaning that Notts, Lincs & Derbyshire 4 dropped another level to become a tier 13 league. Promotion continued to Notts, Lincs & Derbyshire 3 and there was no relegation. At the end of the 1995–96 season the division was discontinued and the majority of clubs transferred to Notts, Lincs & Derbyshire 3.

Notts, Lincs & Derbyshire 4
Season	No. of teams	Champions	Runners–up	Relegated teams	Reference
1993–94	6	Bolsover	Castle Donington	No relegation	
1994–95	7	Cleethorpes	Yarborough Bees	No relegation	
1995–96	10	Bourne (Note: Restructuring saw champions Bourne promoted two levels up into Notts, Lincs & Derbyshire 2.)	Bolsover (Note: Runners up Bolsover would drop out of the leagues at the end of the season. All other teams would be transferred into Notts, Lincs & Derbyshire 3 due to restructuring.)	No relegation	
Green backgrounds are the promotion places.

== Number of league titles ==
- Cleethorpes (2) (Note: One of Cleethorpes titles was for Notts, Lincs & Derbyshire 4 East.)
- Ashbourne (1) (Note: Ashbourne's title was for Notts, Lincs & Derbyshire 4 West.)
- Bakewell Mannerians (1)
- Barton & District (1) (Note: Barton & Districts' title was for Notts, Lincs & Derbyshire 4 East.)
- Bingham (1) (Note: Bingham's title was for Notts, Lincs & Derbyshire 4 East.)
- Bolsover (1)
- Bourne (1)
- Cotgrave (1)
- East Leake (1) (Note: East Leake's title was for Notts, Lincs & Derbyshire 4 West.)
- Leesbrook (1)
- Melbourne (1) (Note: Melbourne's title was for Notts, Lincs & Derbyshire 4 West.)

== See also ==
- Notts, Lincs & Derbyshire 1
- Notts, Lincs & Derbyshire 2
- Notts, Lincs & Derbyshire 3
- Notts, Lincs & Derbyshire 5
- Midlands RFU
- Notts, Lincs & Derbyshire RFU
- English rugby union system
- Rugby union in England
