= Notts, Lincs & Derbyshire/Leicestershire 2 East =

English rugby union league

- Current season or competition: 2003–04 Notts, Lincs & Derbyshire/Leicestershire 2 East
- Sport: Rugby union
- Instituted: 2000; 26 years ago
- Ceased: 2004; 22 years ago
- Number of teams: 7
- Country: England
- Holders: North Kesteven Old Boys (3rd title) (2003–04) (not promoted) (Note: Champions North Kesteven Old Boys would drop out of the leagues.))
- Most titles: North Kesteven Old Boys (3 titles)

Notts, Lincs & Derbyshire/Leicestershire 2 East was a tier 10 English Rugby Union league with teams from Nottinghamshire, Lincolnshire and the eastern region of Leicestershire taking part. (Note: Despite the name Notts, Lincs & Derbyshire, most Derbyshire based teams would play in Notts, Lincs & Derbyshire/Leicestershire 2 West.) Promoted teams moved up to Notts, Lincs & Derbyshire/Leicestershire 1 East and there was no relegation.

The division was created in 2000, along with its counterpart Notts, Lincs & Derbyshire/Leicestershire 2 West, following the splitting of the East Midlands and Leicestershire leagues and the subsequent merging of the Leicestershire and Notts, Lincs & Derbyshire leagues. After four seasons the league was discontinued following further restructuring and the majority of teams moved into the newly created Notts, Lincs, Derbyshire/North Leicestershire and Nottinghamshire/Lincolnshire divisions.

== Original teams ==
When this division was introduced in 2000 it contained the following teams:

- Appleby Frodingham – promoted from Notts, Lincs & Derbyshire 3 (8th)
- Bingham – promoted from Notts, Lincs & Derbyshire 3 (6th)
- Bourne – promoted from Notts, Lincs & Derbyshire 3 (10th)
- Gainsborough – promoted from Notts, Lincs & Derbyshire 3 (79th)
- Horncastle – promoted from Notts, Lincs & Derbyshire 3 (9th)
- North Kesteven Old Boys (Note: North Kesteven Old Boys RUFC would be renamed as North Hykeham RUFC in 2007.) – promoted from Notts, Lincs & Derbyshire 3 (4th)
- Skegness – transferred from Notts, Lincs & Derbyshire 2 (9th)
- Stamford College Old Boys – transferred from Notts, Lincs & Derbyshire 2 (11th)
- Yarborough Bees – promoted from Notts, Lincs & Derbyshire 3 (5th)

== Notts, Lincs & Derbyshire/Leicestershire 2 East honours ==
Notts, Lincs & Derbyshire/Leicestershire 2 East
Season	No of teams	Champions	Runners–up	Relegated teams	Reference
2000–01	9	North Kesteven Old Boys	Stamford College Old Boys	No relegation	
2001–02	9	Stamford College Old Boys	Barton & District	No relegation	
2002–03	9	North Kesteven Old Boys (Note: Champions North Kesteven decline promotion in order to allow clubs younger players a further season to develop.)	Skegness (Note: Runners up Skegness were promoted instead of champions North Hykeham.)	No relegation	
2003–04	7	North Kesteven Old Boys (Note: Champions North Kesteven Old Boys would drop out of the leagues at the end of the season despite winning the title. They would return to league rugby in 2006, taking part in Midlands 6 East (North-East) under the new name North Hykeham RUFC.)	Ollerton	No relegation	
Green backgrounds are the promotion places.

== Number of league titles ==
- North Kesteven Old Boys (3)
- Stamford College Old Boys (1)

== See also ==
- Notts, Lincs & Derbyshire/Leicestershire 1 East
- Notts, Lincs & Derbyshire/Leicestershire 1 West
- Notts, Lincs & Derbyshire/Leicestershire 2 West
- Midlands RFU
- Notts, Lincs & Derbyshire RFU
- Leicestershire RU
- English rugby union system
- Rugby union in England
