= Midlands 6 East (NE) =

English rugby union league

English Rugby Union Midland Division - Midlands 6 East (NE) is an English Rugby Union League.

Midlands 6 East (NE) is made up of teams from around the East Midlands of England who play home and away matches throughout a winter season. As with many low level they are often subject to re-structure

Promoted teams move up to Midlands 5 East (North). Teams that are second place at the end of the season go into a play off with the second placed team in Midlands 6 East (NW).

== Teams 2008-2009 ==
- Bourne
- Cleethorpes
- Keyworth
- North Hykeham
- Ollerton
- Skegness

== Teams 2007-2008 ==
- Bourne
- Cleethorpes
- North Hykeham
- Ollerton
- Skegness
- Worksop

== See also ==
- English rugby union system
