= Cleethorpes RUFC =

English rugby union team based in Cleethorpes, North East Lincolnshire

(England) Cleethorpes RUFC
- Full name: Cleethorpes Rugby Union Football Club
- Union: Notts, Lincs & Derbyshire RFU
- Nickname: The Meggies
- Founded: 1979; 47 years ago
- Location: Cleethorpes, England
- Region: Lincolnshire
- Ground(s): Wilton Fields, Wilton road, Grimsby
- Chairman: Nathan Phillips
- President: Kev Davidson
- League: Midlands 4 East (North)
- 2019–20: 3rd
Team kit

Official website
- www.pitchero.com/clubs/cleethorpes

Cleethorpes Rugby Union Football Club is an English rugby union team based in Cleethorpes, North East Lincolnshire. Established in 1979, the first XV currently plays in Midlands 4 East (North) following their promotion as champions of Midlands 5 East (South) at the end of the 2017-18 season. The club runs two senior sides and seven junior sides. Cleethorpes play their home games at Wilton Fields, and their previous grounds include Taylor’s Avenue, Lucarly's and Lindsey School Rugby Pitches. The club's home colours are navy, gold, and white. They get their nickname of 'The Meggies' from the nickname for the residents of the town.

== History ==
The club was established in 1979 when a group of schoolteachers from Lindsey School, led by Ian Brown, Lee Stephens, and Ron Duffield, were annoyed by the fact that after their students left school, they gave up rugby. They invited players to a meeting at Cleethorpes Cricket Club and Cleethorpes Rugby Club was born. The club's first competitive game took place at RAF Waddington, against a team fielded by the air base. Cleethorpes lost this match, the final score being 29-10. During the 1990s, the club experienced a decline. During this period, it could only turn out one team. However, the club held many charity events during this period, such as publishing a Calendar Girls-style calendar. In recent years, the club have experienced better fortunes, now being able to turn out two senior sides, and several junior sides. The first XV were relegated in the 2015-16 season to the Midlands 5 East (North) after lingering around the bottom half of the Midlands 4 East (North) for a number of seasons.

== Personnel ==
=== Club Officials ===
- President: (England) Kevin Davidson
- Chairman: (England) Nathan Phillips
- Secretary: (England) Phillip Cass

== Honours ==
- Notts, Lincs & Derbyshire 4 champions (2): 1988–89, (Note: 1988–89 title was for Notts, Lincs & Derbyshire 4 East.) 1994–95
- Notts, Lincs & Derbyshire 3 champions: 1997–98
- Midlands 5 East (North) champions (2): 2007–08, 2017–18 (Note: 2007-08 league title was won during period when Midlands 5 East (North) was split into two divisions known as Midlands 6 East (North-East) and Midlands 6 East (North-West) - Cleethorpes won the north-east division.)
