= Midlands 5 East (South) =

English rugby union league

- Sport: Rugby union
- Instituted: 2006; 20 years ago (as Midlands 6 East (South)
- Ceased: 2010; 16 years ago
- Number of teams: 7
- Country: England
- Website: clubs.rfu.com

Midlands 5 East (South) was a level 10 English Rugby Union league and level 5 of the Midlands League, made up of teams from the southern part of the East Midlands region including clubs from Bedfordshire, Leicestershire, Northamptonshire and the occasional side from Cambridgeshire, all of whom played home and away matches throughout the season.

It was formed in 2006 as Midlands 6 East (South), changing name to Midlands 5 East (South) in 2009 following league restructuring. Promoted teams typically moving up to Midlands 4 East (South) (formerly Midlands 5 East (South)) and, as one of the lowest divisions in the Midlands league, there was no relegation. Dwindling numbers of teams from year to year meant that the league was abolished at the end of the 2009-10 season with all teams being transferred into Midlands 4 East (South).

== Teams 2008–09 ==
- Aylestone Athletic
- Biggleswade
- Kempston
- Oadby Wyggestonians
- Oundle
- Queens
- Rushden & Higham
- Stockwood Park
- Stoneygate
- Wellingborough O.G

== Teams 2007–08 ==
- Aylestone Athletic
- Biggleswade
- Deepings
- Market Harborough
- Oundle
- Queens
- Rushden & Higham
- Stamford Park
- Stoneygate
- St Ives (Midlands)

== Original teams ==
When this division was introduced in 2006 as Midlands 6 East (South) it contained the following teams:

- Anstey – relegated from Notts, Lincs & Derbyshire/North Leicestershire (12th)
- Aylestone Athletic – transferred from East Midlands/South Leicestershire 2 (4th)
- Aylestonians – transferred from East Midlands/South Leicestershire 2 (5th)
- Deepings – transferred from East Midlands/South Leicestershire 2 (6th)
- March Bears – transferred from East Midlands/South Leicestershire 2 (8th)
- St Neots – transferred from East Midlands/South Leicestershire 2 (3rd)
- Stamford College Old Boys - transferred from Nottinghamshire/Lincolnshire (8th)
- Thorney – transferred from East Midlands/South Leicestershire 2 (7th)

== Midlands 5 East (South) honours ==
=== Midlands 6 East (South) (2006–2009) ===
Originally known as Midlands 6 East (South), it was a tier 10 league along with its counterparts Midlands 6 East (North-East) and Midlands 6 East (North-West), which were introduced at tier 10 to replace the discontinued East Midlands/South Leicestershire 2, Derbyshire/North Leicestershire, Nottinghamshire/Lincolnshire leagues. Promotion was to Midlands 5 East (South) and there was no relegation.

Midlands 6 East (South)
Season	No of Teams	Champions	Runners–up	Relegated Teams	Reference
2006–07	8	Deepings	Aylestone Athletic	No relegation	
2007–08	7	Kempston	Wellingborough O.G.	No relegation	
2008–09	7	St Neots	Stamford	No relegation	
Green backgrounds are promotion places.

=== Midlands 5 East (South) (2009–2010) ===
League restructuring saw Midlands 6 East (South) renamed as Midlands 5 East (South), remaining a tier 10 league along with counterparts Midlands 5 East (North-East) and Midlands 5 East (North-West). Promotion was now to Midlands 4 East (South) (formerly the old Midlands 5 East (South)) and there was no relegation. The league was discontinued at the end of the 2009–10 season.

Midlands 5 East (South)
Season	No of Teams	Champions	Runners–up	Relegated Teams	Reference
2009–10	5	St Ives (Midlands)	Aylestone Athletic (Note: Last season as Midlands 5 East (South) as division to be abolished. All teams in the division would be promoted to Midlands 4 East (South).)	No relegation	
Green backgrounds are promotion places.

== Number of league titles ==
- Deepings (1)
- Kempston (1)
- St Ives (Midlands) (1)
- St Neots (1)

== See also ==
- East Midlands RFU
- Leicestershire RFU
- Midlands 6 East (S)
- English rugby union system
- Rugby union in England
