= Membraneless Fuel Cells =

Membraneless Fuel Cells convert stored chemical energy into electrical energy without the use of a conducting membrane as with other types of fuel cells. In Laminar flow fuel cells (LFFC) this is achieved by exploiting the phenomenon of non-mixing laminar flows where the interface between the two flows works as a proton/ion conductor. The interface allows for high diffusivity and eliminates the need for costly membranes. The operating principles of these cells mean that they can only be built to millimeter-scale sizes. The lack of a membrane means they are cheaper but the size limits their use to portable applications which require small amounts of power.

Another type of membraneless fuel cell is a Mixed Reactant Fuel Cell (MRFC). Unlike LFFCs, MRFCs use a mixed fuel and electrolyte, and are thus not subject to the same limitations. Without a membrane, MRFCs depend on the characteristics of the electrodes to separate the oxidation and reduction reactions. By eliminating the membrane and delivering the reactants as a mixture, MRFCs can potentially be simpler and less costly than conventional fuel cell systems.

The efficiency of these cells is generally much higher than modern electricity producing sources. For example, a fossil fuel power plant system can achieve a 40% electrical conversion efficiency while an outdated nuclear power plant is slightly lower at 32%. GenIII and GenIV Nuclear Fission plants can get up to 90% efficient if using direct conversion or up to 65% efficient if using a magnetohydrodynamic generator as a topping cycle{{Citation needed|reason=again, the numbers seem way off. The best achieved efficiency for the initial cycle is about 30%. The capture of residual thermal energy is at best 30% to date, which comes to an overall efficiency of 51% at best |date=June 2022}}. Fuel cell systems are capable of reaching efficiencies in the range of 55%–70%. However, as with any process, fuel cells also experience inherent losses due to their design and manufacturing processes.

== Overview ==
Fuel Cell Diagram. Note: Electrolyte can be a polymer or solid oxide

A fuel cell consists of an electrolyte which is placed in between two electrodes – the cathode and the anode. In the simplest case, hydrogen gas passes over the cathode, where it is decomposed into hydrogen protons and electrons. The protons pass through the electrolyte (often NAFION – manufactured by DuPont) across to the anode to the oxygen. Meanwhile, the free electrons travel around the cell to power a given load and then combine with the oxygen and hydrogen at the anode to form water. Two common types of electrolytes are a proton exchange membrane(PEM) (also known as Polymer Electrolyte Membrane) and a ceramic or solid oxide electrolyte (often used in Solid oxide fuel cells). Although hydrogen and oxygen are very common reactants, a plethora of other reactants exist and have been proven effective.

Hydrogen for fuel cells can be produced in many ways. The most common method in the United States (95% of production) is via Gas reforming, specifically using methane, which produces hydrogen from fossil fuels by running them through a high temperature steam process. Since fossil fuels are primarily composed of carbon and hydrogen molecules of various sizes, various fossil fuels can be utilized. For example, methanol, ethanol, and methane can all be used in the reforming process. Electrolysis and high temperature combination cycles are also used to provide hydrogen from water whereby the heat and electricity provide sufficient energy to disassociate the hydrogen and oxygen atoms.

However, since these methods of hydrogen production are often energy and space intensive, it is often more convenient to use the chemicals directly in the fuel cell. Direct methanol fuel cells (DMFC's), for example, use methanol as the reactant instead of first using reformation to produce hydrogen. Although DMFC's are not very efficient (~25%), they are energy dense which means that they are quite suitable for portable power applications. Another advantage over gaseous fuels, as in the H_{2}-O_{2} cells, is that liquids are much easier to handle, transport, pump and often have higher specific energies allowing for greater power extraction. Generally gases need to be stored in high pressure containers or cryogenic liquid containers which is a significant disadvantage to liquid transport.

== Membraneless fuel cells and operating principles ==
The majority of fuel cell technologies currently employed are either PEM or SOFC cells. However, the electrolyte is often costly and not always completely effective. Although hydrogen technology has significantly evolved, other fossil fuel based cells (such as DMFC's) are still plagued by the shortcomings of proton exchange membranes. For example, fuel crossover means that low concentrations need to be used which limits the available power of the cell. In solid oxide fuel cells, high temperatures are needed which require energy and can also lead to quicker degradation of materials. Membraneless fuel cells offer a solution to these problems.

=== Laminar flow ===
A vortex street around a cylinder. At the beginning of the vortex, both fluids are separate. This indicates laminar flow with minimal mixing.

LFFC's overcome the problem of unwanted crossover through the manipulation of the Reynolds number, which describes the behavior of a fluid. In general, at low Reynolds numbers, flow is laminar whereas turbulence occurs at a higher Reynolds number. In laminar flow, two fluids will interact primarily through diffusion which means mixing is limited. By choosing the correct fuel and oxidizing agents in LFFC's, protons can be allowed to diffuse from the anode to the cathode across the interface of the two streams. The LFFC's are not limited to a liquid feed and in certain cases, depending on the geometry and reactants, gases can also be advantageous. Current designs inject the fuel and oxidizing agent into two separate streams which flow side by side. The interface between the fluids acts as the electrolytic membrane across which protons diffuse. Membraneless fuel cells offer a cost advantage due to the lack of the electrolytic membrane. Further, a decrease in crossover also increases fuel efficiency resulting in higher power output.

=== Diffusion ===
Diffusion across the interface is extremely important and can severely affect fuel cell performance. The protons need to be able to diffuse across both the fuel and the oxidizing agent. The diffusion coefficient, a term which describes the ease of diffusion of an element in another medium, can be combined with Fick's laws of diffusion which addresses the effects of a concentration gradient and distance over which diffusion occurs:

$$J = - D \frac{\partial \phi}{\partial x} \bigg.$$

where

- J is the diffusion flux in dimensions of [(amount of substance) length^{−2} time^{−1}], example $\left(\tfrac{\mathrm{mol}}\mathrm{m^2\cdot s}\right)$. J measures the amount of substance that will flow through a small area during a small time interval.
- D is the diffusion coefficient or diffusivity in dimensions of [length^{2} time^{−1}], example $\left(\tfrac\mathrm{m^2}\mathrm{s}\right)$
- ϕ (for ideal mixtures) is the concentration in dimensions of [(amount of substance) length^{−3}], example $\left(\tfrac{\mathrm{mol}}\mathrm{m^3}\right)$
- x is the diffusion length i.e. the distance over which diffusion occurs

In order to increase the diffusion flux, the diffusivity and/or concentration need to be increased while the length needs to be decreased. In DMFC's for example, the thickness of the membrane determines the diffusion length while the concentration is often limited due to crossover. Thus, the diffusion flux is limited. A membraneless fuel cell is theoretically the better option since the diffusion interface across both fluids is extremely thin and using higher concentrations does not result in a drastic effect on crossover.

In most fuel cell configurations with liquid feeds, the fuel and oxidizing solutions almost always contain water which acts as a diffusion medium. In many hydrogen-oxygen fuel cells, the diffusion of oxygen at the cathode is rate limiting since the diffusivity of oxygen in water is much lower than that of hydrogen. As a result, LFFC performance can also be improved by not using aqueous oxygen carriers.

=== Research and development ===
The promise of membraneless fuel cells has been offset by several problems inherent to their designs. Ancillary structures are one of the largest obstacles. For example, pumps are required to maintain laminar flow while gas separators can be needed to supply the correct fuels into the cells. For micro fuel cells, these pumps and separators need to be miniaturized and packaged into a small volume (under 1 cm^{3}). Associated with this process is a so-called "packaging penalty" which results in higher costs. Further, pumping power drastically increases with decreasing size (see Scaling Laws) which is disadvantageous. Efficient packaging methods and/or self-pumping cells (see Research and Development) need to be developed to make this technology viable. Also, while using high concentrations of specific fuels, such as methanol, crossover still occurs. This problem can be partially solved by using a nanoporous separator, lowering fuel concentration or choosing reactants which have a lower tendency towards crossover.

Date: January 2010: Researchers developed a novel method of inducing self-pumping in a membraneless fuel cell. Using formic acid as a fuel and sulfuric acid as an oxidant, CO_{2} is produced in the reaction in the form of bubbles. The bubbles nucleate and coalesce on the anode. A check valve at the supply end prevents any fuel entering while the bubbles are growing. The check valve is not mechanical but hydrophobic in nature. By creating micro structures which form specific contact angles with water, fuel cannot be drawn backwards. As the reaction continues, more CO_{2} is formed while fuel is consumed. The bubble begins to propagate towards the outlet of the cell. However, before the outlet, a hydrophobic vent allows the carbon dioxide to escape while simultaneously ensuring other byproducts (such as water) do not clog the vent. As the carbon dioxide is being vented, fresh fuel is also drawn in at the same through the check valve and the cycle begins again. Thus, the fuel cell pumping is regulated by the reaction rate. This type of cell is not a two stream laminar flow fuel cell. Since the formation of bubbles can disrupt two separate laminar flows, a combined stream of fuel and oxidant was used. In laminar conditions, mixing will still not occur. It was found that using selective catalysts (i.e. Not platinum) or extremely low flow rates can prevent crossover.

== Scaling issues ==
Membraneless fuel cells are currently being manufactured on the micro scale using fabrication processes found in the MEMS/NEMS area. These cell sizes are suited for the small scale due to the limit of their operating principles. The scale-up of these cells to the 2–10 Watt range has proven difficult since, at large scales, the cells cannot maintain the correct operating conditions.

For example, laminar flow is a necessary condition for these cells. Without laminar flow, crossover would occur and a physical electrolytic membrane would be needed. Maintaining laminar flow is achievable on the macro scale but maintaining a steady Reynolds number is difficult due to variations in pumping. This variation causes fluctuations at the reactant interfaces which can disrupt laminar flow and affect diffusion and crossover. However, self-pumping mechanisms can be difficult and expensive to produce on the macro-scale. In order to take advantage of hydrophobic effects, the surfaces need to be smooth to control the contact angle of water. To produce these surfaces on a large scale, the cost will significantly increase due to the close tolerances which are needed. Also, it is not evident whether using a carbon-dioxide based pumping system on the large scale is viable.

Membraneless fuel cells can utilize self-pumping mechanisms but requires the use of fuel which release GHG's (greenhouse gases) and other unwanted products. To use an environmentally friendly fuel configuration (such as H_{2}-O_{2}), self pumping can be difficult. Thus, external pumps are required. However, for a rectangular channel, the pressure required increases proportional to the L^{−3}, where L is a length unit of the cell. Thus, by decreasing the size of a cell from 10 cm to 1 cm, the required pressure will increase by 1000. For micro fuel cells, this pumping requirement requires high voltages. Although in some cases, Electroosmotic flow can be induced. However, for liquid mediums, high voltages are also required. Further, with decreasing size, surface tension effects also become significantly more important. For the fuel cell configuration with a carbon dioxide generating mechanism, the surface tension effects could also increase the pumping requirements drastically.

== Potential Applications of laminar flow fuel cells ==
The thermodynamic potential of a fuel cell limits the amount of power that an individual cell can deliver. Therefore, in order to obtain more power, fuel cells must be connected in series or parallel (depending on whether greater current or voltage is desired). For large scale building and automobile power applications, macro fuel cells can be used because space is not necessarily the limiting constraint. However, for portable devices such as cell phones and laptops, macro fuel cells are often inefficient due to their space requirements lower run times. LFFCs however, are perfectly suited for these types of applications. The lack of a physical electrolytic membrane and energy dense fuels that can be used means that LFFC's can be produced at lower costs and smaller sizes. In most portable applications, energy density is more important than efficiency due to the low power requirements.
