= Leesbrook RUFC =

English rugby union club

Leesbrook Rugby Football Club is an Englishrugby union club based at the Asterdale Sports Centre in Spondon, Derby that plays in the Midlands Division.

== 2007–08 season ==
2007–08 Midlands 6 East (NW)
Pos	Team	Pld	W	D	L	PF	PA	PD	Pts	Promotion
1	Belper (C, P)	18	15	0	3	628	113	+515	30	Promoted to Midlands 5 East (North) as champions
2	Leesbrook (P)	18	15	0	3	523	132	+391	30	Promoted to Midlands 5 East (North) after winning playoff
3	Uttoxeter	18	14	0	4	368	126	+242	28	
4	Keyworth	18	12	0	6	457	228	+229	24	
5	All Spartans OB	18	9	1	8	358	314	+44	19	
6	Tupton	18	7	2	9	306	446	−140	16	
7	Long Eaton	18	5	0	13	200	408	−208	10	
8	Meden Vale	18	4	1	13	213	451	−238	9	
9	Boots	18	4	0	14	153	644	−491	8	
10	Chesterfield	18	3	0	15	158	502	−344	6	

(C) Champions; (P) Promoted

== Club honors ==
- Notts, Lincs & Derbyshire 4 champions: 1991–92
- Notts, Lincs & Derbyshire 2 champions: 1993–94
- Notts, Lincs & Derbyshire/Leicestershire 2 West champions: 2002–03
- Midlands 6 East (North-East) promotion playoff winners: 2007–08
- Pennant league champions 2016/17, Derbyshire cup champions 2016/17
