= Melbourne RFC =

English rugby union club

Melbourne
- Melbourne RFC Club Badge
- Full name: Melbourne Rugby Football Club
- Union: Notts, Lincs & Derbyshire RFU
- Founded: 1982; 43 years ago
- Location: Melbourne, England
- Ground: Cockshut Lane (Capacity: 2,000)
- Chairman: Ian Lucas
- Coach: Gary Rudkin
- League: Regional 2 North Midlands
- 2024–25: 3rd
Team kit

Official website
- www.melbournerfc.com

Melbourne Rugby Football Club is an English rugby union club, from Derbyshire, which plays in Regional 2 North Midlands; a level six league.

== History ==
The club has grown rapidly since its establishment in 1982 – an account of which now exists on the club website. In 2016 a pavilion (the Melbourne Sporting Partnership) was completed, delivering modern function rooms and changing rooms for the club and its sister clubs (football, cricket and tennis). Ongoing investments continue – an electronic score board adorns the pavilion, and further developments of the pitches are expected to be confirmed in early 2020.

== Recent ==
The club had over 400 regular players in the 2019–20 season. The seniors' section includes the 1st XV, and also a 2nd XV, a 3rd XV, and an Academy for transitioning U-16s into seniors rugby. The large minis and junior section for boys and girls rugby accounts for two-thirds of the club player base. Touch rugby is also played year-round. Melbourne RFC recently featured in the June 2019 edition of Rugby Club Magazine.

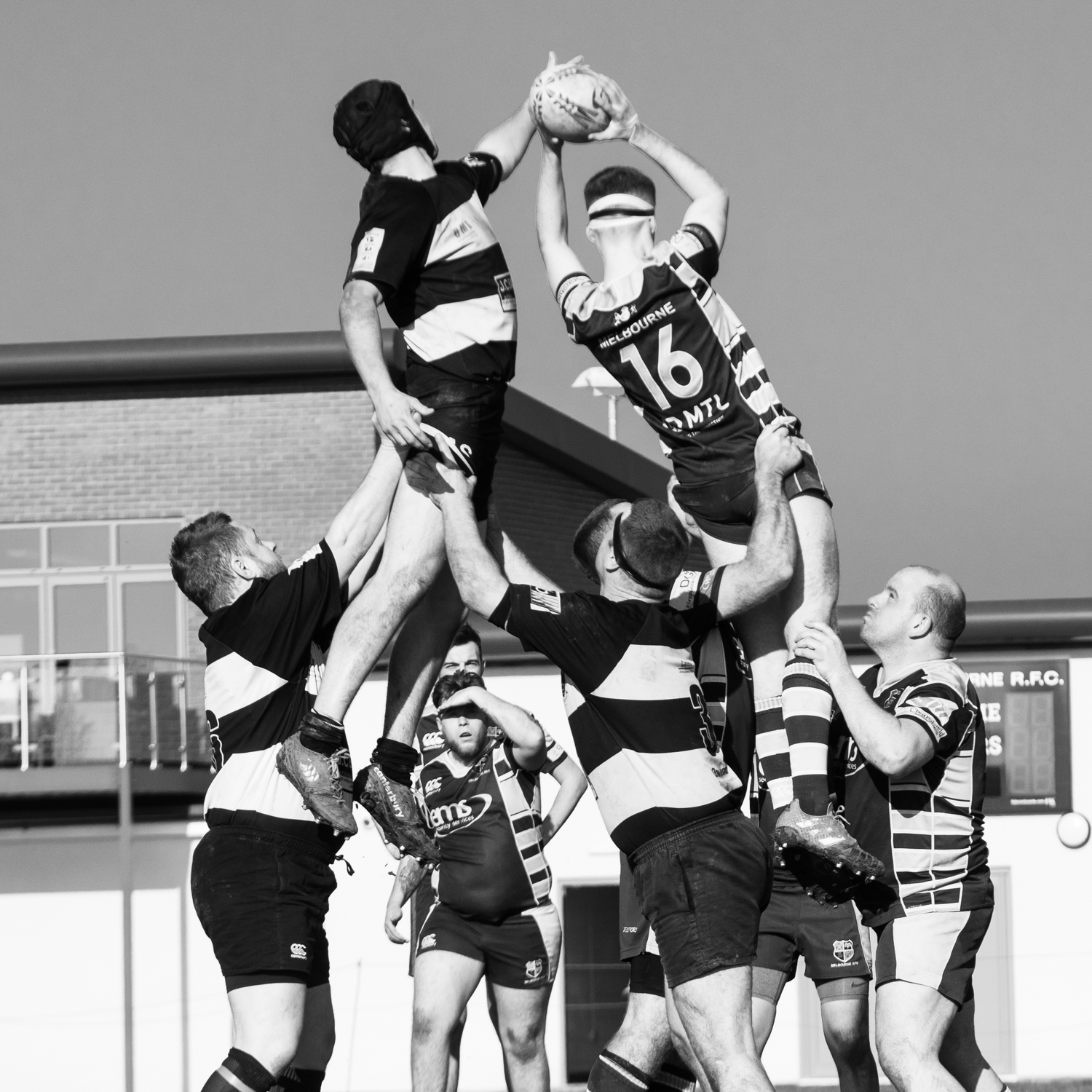
Melbourne RFC 3XV playing at home in front of the new pavilion

A former England under-18s', Will Allman's home club is Melbourne.

== Honours ==
- Notts, Lincs & Derbyshire 4 West champions: 1988–89
- Midlands 3 East (North) champions: 2012–13
- Midlands 2 East (North) champions (2): 2016–17, 2018–19
