= 2002–03 National Division Three North =

Rugby union competition in England

- Countries: England
- Champions: Nuneaton
- Runners-up: New Brighton
- Relegated: Scunthorpe, Hull Ionians, Broadstreet, Bedford Athletic
- Attendance: N/A (Note: Due to extremely poor coverage and reporting by the media for this season there is not enough attendance data for the league to give an accurate figure.)
- Top point scorer: (England) Tony Handley (Waterloo); 293 points
- Top try scorer: (England) Jody Peacock (Nuneaton) (England) Gary Marshall (Nuneaton); 21 tries

The 2002–03 National Division Three North was the third season (fifteenth overall) of the fourth division (north) of the English domestic rugby union competition using the name National Division Three North. New teams to the division included Preston Grasshoppers and Waterloo who were relegated from the 2001–02 National Division Two while promoted teams included Broadstreet who came up as champions of Midlands Division 1 while Halifax (champions) and Hull Ionians (playoffs) came up from North Division 1. The league system was 2 points for a win and 1 point for a draw with the promotion system changing for this season with a playoff system being introduced. The champions of both National Division Three North and National Division Three South would automatically go up but the runners up of these two divisions would meet each other in a one off match (at the home ground of the side with the superior league record) to see who would claim the third and final promotion place to National Division Two for the following season.

By the end of the season Nuneaton would finish as champions, just edging out runners up New Brighton by virtue of an extra win and gaining promotion to the 2003–04 National Division Two. New Brighton would go into a promotion playoff away at the 2002–03 National Division Three South runners up Lydney but were unable to join Nuneaton as Lydney won 21 - 7 to claim the final promotion slot. At the other end of the table, Scunthorpe were the first team to be relegated with just one win all season while Hull Ionians, Broadstreet and Bedford Athletic were the other teams to go down at a later date with Bedford Athletic just one point off safety. Hull Ionians would drop to North Division 1 while Scunthorpe, Broadstreet and Bedford Athletic would drop to Midlands Division 1.

== Participating teams and locations ==
Locations of the 2002-03 National Division Three North teams

Team	Stadium	Capacity	City/Area
Bedford Athletic	Putnoe Woods	500	Bedford, Bedfordshire
Blaydon	Crow Trees	2,000 (400 seats)	Swalwell, Tyne and Wear
Broadstreet	Ivor Preece Field	1,500 (250 seats)	Coventry, West Midlands
Darlington Mowden Park	Yiewsley Drive		Darlington, County Durham
Dudley Kingswinford	Heathbrook	2,260	Kingswinford, Dudley, West Midlands
Halifax	Ovenden Park		Halifax, West Yorkshire
Hull Ionians	Brantingham Park	1,500 (240 seats)	Brantingham, East Riding of Yorkshire
Liverpool St Helens	Moss Lane	4,370 (370 seats)	St Helens, Merseyside
New Brighton	Hartsfield	2,000	Wirral, Merseyside
Nuneaton	Liberty Way	3,800 (500 seats)	Nuneaton, Warwickshire
Preston Grasshoppers	Lightfoot Green	2,250 (250 seats)	Preston, Lancashire
Scunthorpe	Heslam Park	1,212 (212 seats)	Scunthorpe, Lincolnshire
Tynedale	Tynedale Park	2,000 (400 seats)	Corbridge, Northumberland
Waterloo	St Anthony's Road	9,950 (950 seats)	Blundellsands, Merseyside

== Final league table ==
2002–03 National Division Three North table
Pos	Team	Pld	W	D	L	PF	PA	PD	Pts	Qualification
1	Nuneaton (C)	26	23	0	3	802	406	+396	46	Promoted
2	New Brighton	26	22	0	4	812	441	+371	44	Promotion play-off
3	Waterloo	26	21	0	5	888	458	+430	42	
4	Halifax	26	17	0	9	666	588	+78	34	
5	Darlington Mowden Park	26	14	0	12	688	491	+197	28	
6	Liverpool St Helens	26	12	1	13	612	574	+38	25	
7	Tynedale	26	12	1	13	561	582	−21	25	
8	Blaydon	26	12	0	14	568	645	−77	24	
9	Preston Grasshoppers	26	11	1	14	617	625	−8	23	
10	Dudley Kingswinford	26	10	1	15	502	596	−94	21	
11	Bedford Athletic (R)	26	10	0	16	497	625	−128	20	Relegated
12	Broadstreet (R)	26	8	1	17	477	795	−318	17	Relegated
13	Hull Ionians (R)	26	6	1	19	515	747	−232	13	Relegated
14	Scunthorpe (R)	26	1	0	25	343	975	−632	2	Relegated

Updated to match(es) played on 19-04-2003. Source: Rugby Statbunker
(C) Champions; (R) Relegated

== Results ==
=== Round 1 ===
31 August 2002

Blaydon	20 - 22	Dudley Kingswinford
	Report

Crow Trees
Referee: Brendan Fitzmaurice

31 August 2002

Broadstreet	21 - 42	Halifax
	Report

Ivor Preece Field
Referee: Andrew Canning

31 August 2002

Darlington Mowden Park	31 - 18	Tynedale
	Report

Yiewsley Drive
Referee: S Makinson

31 August 2002

Liverpool St Helens	28 - 19	Bedford Athletic
	Report

Moss Lane
Referee: Andrew Gardner

31 August 2002

Nuneaton	24 - 18	New Brighton
	Report

Liberty Way
Referee: David Drury

31 August 2002

Waterloo	35 - 10	Preston Grasshoppers
	Report

St Anthony's Road
Referee: Mark Rose

1 September 2002

Scunthorpe	14 - 52	Hull Ionians
	Report

Heslam Park
Referee: Mick Reid

=== Round 2 ===
7 September 2002

Dudley Kingswinford	23 - 18	Darlington Mowden Park
	Report

Heathbrook
Referee: Andrew Vertigan

7 September 2002

Halifax	33 - 30	Bedford Athletic
	Report

Ovenden Park
Referee: Guy Steel Bodger

7 September 2002

Hull Ionians	19 - 21	Broadstreet
	Report

Brantingham Park
Referee: Brendan Fitzmaurice

7 September 2002

New Brighton	42 - 21	Blaydon
	Report

Hartsfield
Referee: Don Helme

7 September 2002

Preston Grasshoppers	22 - 34	Nuneaton
	Report

Lightfoot Green
Referee: Mick Reid

7 September 2002

Tynedale	46 - 5	Scunthorpe
	Report

Tynedale Park

7 September 2002

Waterloo	17 - 33	Liverpool St Helens
	Report

St Anthony's Road
Referee: Alan Hughes

=== Round 3 ===
14 September 2002

Bedford Athletic	22 - 9	Hull Ionians
	Report

Putnoe Woods
Referee: Rowan Kitt

14 September 2002

Blaydon	33 - 32	Preston Grasshoppers
	Report

Crow Trees
Referee: Chris Sharp

14 September 2002

Broadstreet	8 - 14	Tynedale
	Report

Ivor Preece Field
Referee: Paul Dickens

14 September 2002

Darlington Mowden Park	11 - 28	New Brighton
	Report

Yiewsley Drive
Referee: Brendan Fitzmaurice

14 September 2002

Liverpool St Helens	28 - 10	Halifax
	Report

Moss Lane
Referee: Mick Reid

14 September 2002

Nuneaton	57 - 21	Waterloo
	Report

Liberty Way
Referee: Andrew Gardner

14 September 2002

Scunthorpe	12 - 13	Dudley Kingswinford
	Report

Heslam Park
Attendance: 250
Referee: David Drury

=== Round 4 ===
28 September 2002

Dudley Kingswinford	41 - 17	Broadstreet
	Report

Heathbrook
Referee: L Coltue

28 September 2002

Hull Ionians	30 - 15	Halifax
	Report

Brantingham Park

28 September 2002

New Brighton	33 - 3	Scunthorpe
	Report

Hartsfield
Referee: Brendan Fitzmaurice

28 September 2002

Nuneaton	35 - 14	Liverpool St Helens
	Report

Liberty Way
Referee: Rob Sawyer

28 September 2002

Preston Grasshoppers	18 - 34	Darlington Mowden Park
	Report

Lightfoot Green
Referee: Llyr Apgeraint-Roberts

28 September 2002

Tynedale	18 - 16	Bedford Athletic
	Report

Tynedale Park
Referee: Andrew Gardner

28 September 2002

Waterloo	35 - 13	Blaydon
	Report

St Anthony's Road
Referee: David Drury

=== Round 5 ===
12 October 2002

Bedford Athletic	19 - 5	Dudley Kingswinford
	Report

Putnoe Woods
Referee: Paul Dickens

12 October 2002

Blaydon	8 - 13	Nuneaton
	Report

Crow Trees
Attendance: 150
Referee: Llyr Apgeraint-Roberts

12 October 2002

Broadstreet	23 - 46	New Brighton
	Report

Ivor Preece Field
Referee: S Makinson

12 October 2002

Darlington Mowden Park	27 - 29	Waterloo
	Report

Yiewsley Drive
Referee: Andrew Vertigan

12 October 2002

Halifax	29 - 14	Tynedale
	Report

Ovenden Park
Referee: Andrew Gardner

12 October 2002

Liverpool St Helens	17 - 10	Hull Ionians
	Report

Moss Lane
Referee: David Drury

12 October 2002

Scunthorpe	15 - 29	Preston Grasshoppers
	Report

Heslam Park
Attendance: 350
Referee: Greg Garner

=== Round 6 ===
19 October 2002

Blaydon	28 - 20	Liverpool St Helens
	Report

Crow Trees
Referee: Matthew Daubney

19 October 2002

Preston Grasshoppers	34 - 20	Broadstreet
	Report

Lightfoot Green
Referee: Dale Newitt

19 October 2002

Tynedale	57 - 22	Hull Ionians
	Report

Tynedale Park
Referee: Ged Stone

19 October 2002

Dudley Kingswinford	P - P	Halifax

- Postponed. Game rescheduled to 28 December 2002.

19 October 2002

New Brighton	P - P	Bedford Athletic

- Postponed. Game rescheduled to 28 December 2002.

19 October 2002

Nuneaton	P - P	Darlington Mowden Park

- Postponed. Game rescheduled to 28 December 2002.

19 October 2002

Waterloo	P - P	Scunthorpe

- Postponed. Game rescheduled to 28 December 2002.

=== Round 7 ===
26 October 2002

Bedford Athletic	36 - 15	Preston Grasshoppers
	Report

Putnoe Woods
Referee: Dean Richards

26 October 2002

Broadstreet	13 - 24	Waterloo
	Report

Ivor Preece Field
Referee: Wayne Poulter

26 October 2002

Darlington Mowden Park	10 - 25	Blaydon
	Report

Yiewsley Drive
Referee: Marcus Anderson

26 October 2002

Halifax	32 - 27	New Brighton
	Report

Ovenden Park
Referee: Chris Seeley

26 October 2002

Hull Ionians	19 - 20	Dudley Kingswinford
	Report

Brantingham Park
Referee: Mick Reid

26 October 2002

Scunthorpe	22 - 31	Nuneaton
	Report

Heslam Park
Referee: Andrew Vertigan

26 October 2002

Tynedale	35 - 28	Liverpool St Helens
	Report

Tynedale Park
Referee: Brendan Fitzmaurice

=== Round 8 ===
1 November 2002

Nuneaton	36 - 13	Broadstreet
	Report

Liberty Way
Attendance: 1,200
Referee: Nick Williams

2 November 2002

Blaydon	35 - 25	Scunthorpe
	Report

Crow Trees
Referee: Ged Stone

2 November 2002

Dudley Kingswinford	16 - 16	Tynedale
	Report

Heathbrook
Referee: Llyr Apgeraint-Roberts

2 November 2002

Liverpool St Helens	21 - 20	Darlington Mowden Park
	Report

Moss Lane
Referee: Don Helme

2 November 2002

New Brighton	23 - 6	Hull Ionians
	Report

Hartsfield
Referee: Andrew Vertigan

2 November 2002

Preston Grasshoppers	20 - 16	Halifax
	Report

Lightfoot Green
Referee: Mick Reid

2 November 2002

Waterloo	53 - 3	Bedford Athletic
	Report

St Anthony's Road
Referee: Mike Hamlin

=== Round 9 ===
9 November 2002

Bedford Athletic	8 - 52	New Brighton
	Report

Putnoe Woods
Referee: Paul Dickens

9 November 2002

Broadstreet	26 - 20	Preston Grasshoppers
	Report

Ivor Preece Field
Referee: Llyr Apgeraint-Roberts

9 November 2002

Darlington Mowden Park	20 - 27	Nuneaton
	Report

Yiewsley Drive
Referee: Chris Seeley

9 November 2002

Hull Ionians	30 - 15	Tynedale
	Report

Brantingham Park
Referee: David Drury

9 November 2002

Halifax	P - P	Dudley Kingswinford

- Postponed. Game rescheduled to 15 February 2003.

9 November 2002

Liverpool St Helens	P - P	Blaydon

- Postponed. Game rescheduled to 28 December 2002.

9 November 2002

Scunthorpe	P - P	Waterloo

- Postponed. Game rescheduled to 15 February 2003.

=== Round 10 ===
16 November 2002

Dudley Kingswinford	23 - 11	Bedford Athletic
	Report

Heathbrook
Referee: Calum Fraser

16 November 2002

Hull Ionians	30 - 8	Liverpool St Helens
	Report

Brantingham Park

16 November 2002

New Brighton	34 - 14	Broadstreet
	Report

Hartsfield
Referee: Mike Hamlin

16 November 2002

Nuneaton	32 - 10	Blaydon
	Report

Liberty Way
Referee: S Makinson

16 November 2002

Preston Grasshoppers	41 - 6	Scunthorpe
	Report

Lightfoot Green
Referee: Brendan Fitzmaurice

16 November 2002

Tynedale	18 - 29	Halifax
	Report

Tynedale Park
Referee: Matthew Daubney

16 November 2002

Waterloo	20 - 16	Darlington Mowden Park
	Report

St Anthony's Road
Referee: Mick Reid

=== Round 11 ===
23 November 2002

Bedford Athletic	18 - 25	Tynedale
	Report

Putnoe Woods
Referee: Rob Sawyer

23 November 2002

Blaydon	35 - 19	Waterloo
	Report

Crow Trees
Referee: Marcus Anderson

23 November 2002

Broadstreet	33 - 10	Dudley Kingswinford
	Report

Ivor Preece Field
Referee: Chris Deeley

23 November 2002

Darlington Mowden Park	38 - 14	Preston Grasshoppers
	Report

Yiewsley Drive
Referee: David Drury

23 November 2002

Halifax	35 - 13	Hull Ionians
	Report

Ovenden Park
Referee: Mike Hamlin

23 November 2002

Liverpool St Helens	23 - 31	Nuneaton
	Report

Moss Lane
Referee: Andrew Gardner

23 November 2002

Scunthorpe	P - P	New Brighton

- Postponed. Game rescheduled to 8 March 2003.

=== Round 12 ===
30 November 2002

Dudley Kingswinford	27 - 5	Scunthorpe
	Report

Heathbrook
Referee: Guy Steel Bodger

30 November 2002

Hull Ionians	15 - 7	Bedford Athletic
	Report

Brantingham Park
Referee: Don Helme

30 November 2002

New Brighton	34 - 0	Darlington Mowden Park
	Report

Hartsfield
Referee: Brendan Fitzmaurice

30 November 2002

Preston Grasshoppers	15 - 11	Blaydon
	Report

Lightfoot Green
Referee: Andrew Gardner

30 November 2002

Tynedale	34 - 21	Broadstreet
	Report

Tynedale Park
Referee: Andrew Vertigan

30 November 2002

Waterloo	12 - 15	Nuneaton
	Report

St Anthony's Road
Referee: Steve Lander

30 November 2002

Halifax	P - P	Liverpool St Helens

- Postponed. Game rescheduled to 8 March 2003.

=== Round 13 ===
7 December 2002

Bedford Athletic	16 - 20	Halifax
	Report

Putnoe Woods
Referee: Mark Varnon

7 December 2002

Blaydon	22 - 35	New Brighton
	Report

Crow Trees
Referee: David Drury

7 December 2002

Broadstreet	28 - 28	Hull Ionians
	Report

Ivor Preece Field
Referee: S Makinson

7 December 2002

Darlington Mowden Park	20 - 11	Dudley Kingswinford
	Report

Yiewsley Drive
Referee: Chris Seeley

7 December 2002

Liverpool St Helens	19 - 20	Waterloo
	Report

Moss Lane
Referee: D Edmunds

7 December 2002

Nuneaton	20 - 13	Preston Grasshoppers
	Report

Liberty Way
Referee: Mick Reid

7 December 2002

Scunthorpe	19 - 20	Tynedale
	Report

Heslam Park
Referee: Mike Hamlin

=== Round 14 ===
14 December 2002

Bedford Athletic	17 - 10	Liverpool St Helens
	Report

Putnoe Woods
Referee: Rob Sawyer

14 December 2002

Dudley Kingswinford	18 - 20	Blaydon
	Report

Heathbrook
Referee: Llyr Apgeraint-Roberts

14 December 2002

Halifax	20 - 10	Broadstreet
	Report

Ovenden Park
Referee: Brendan Fitzmaurice

14 December 2002

Hull Ionians	14 - 15	Scunthorpe
	Report

Brantingham Park
Referee: Mick Reid

14 December 2002

New Brighton	11 - 8	Nuneaton
	Report

Hartsfield
Referee: Mike Hamlin

14 December 2002

Preston Grasshoppers	22 - 34	Waterloo
	Report

Lightfoot Green
Referee: Don Helme

14 December 2002

Tynedale	23 - 17	Darlington Mowden Park
	Report

Tynedale Park
Referee: Andrew Gardner

=== Round 15 ===
21 December 2002

Broadstreet	21 - 12	Bedford Athletic
	Report

Ivor Preece Field
Referee: Paul Dickens

21 December 2002

Darlington Mowden Park	43 - 15	Hull Ionians
	Report

Yiewsley Drive
Referee: Rob Sawyer

21 December 2002

Liverpool St Helens	21 - 20	Preston Grasshoppers
	Report

Moss Lane
Referee: Mike Hamlin

21 December 2002

Nuneaton	33 - 24	Dudley Kingswinford
	Report

Liberty Way
Referee: Gareth Consey

21 December 2002

Scunthorpe	15 - 17	Halifax
	Report

Heslam Park
Referee: S Makinson

21 December 2002

Waterloo	29 - 25	New Brighton
	Report

St Anthony's Road
Referee: Mick Reid

21 December 2002

Blaydon	P - P	Tynedale

- Postponed. Game rescheduled to 22 March 2003.

=== Rounds 6 & 9 (rescheduled games) ===
28 December 2002

Dudley Kingswinford	24 - 38	Halifax
	Report

Heathbrook
Referee: Graham Hughes

- Game rescheduled from 19 October 2002.

28 December 2002

Liverpool St Helens	17 - 22	Blaydon
	Report

Moss Lane
Referee: Chris Seeley

- Game rescheduled from 9 November 2002.

28 December 2002

New Brighton	40 - 15	Bedford Athletic
	Report

Hartsfield
Referee: David Drury

- Game rescheduled from 19 October 2002.

28 December 2002

Nuneaton	37 - 15	Darlington Mowden Park
	Report

Liberty Way
Referee: Llyr Apgeraint-Roberts

- Game rescheduled from 19 October 2002.

28 December 2002

Waterloo	60 - 5	Scunthorpe
	Report

St Anthony's Road
Referee: Brendan Fitzmaurice

- Game rescheduled from 19 October 2002.

=== Round 16 ===
4 January 2003

Dudley Kingswinford	13 - 38	Waterloo
	Report

Heathbrook
Referee: Mark Rose

4 January 2003

Hull Ionians	15 - 26	Blaydon
	Report

Brantingham Park
Referee: Andrew Gardner

4 January 2003

New Brighton	17 - 29	Preston Grasshoppers
	Report

Hartsfield
Referee: Mick Reid

4 January 2003

Tynedale	24 - 3	Nuneaton
	Report

Tynedale Park
Referee: Andrew Vertigan

4 January 2003

Bedford Athletic	P - P	Scunthorpe

- Postponed. Game rescheduled to 22 March 2003.

4 January 2003

Broadstreet	P - P	Liverpool St Helens

- Postponed. Game rescheduled to 15 February 2003.

4 January 2003

Halifax	P - P	Darlington Mowden Park

- Postponed. Game rescheduled to 22 March 2003.

=== Round 17 ===
11 January 2003

Scunthorpe	13 - 17	Broadstreet
	Report

Heslam Park
Attendance: 200
Referee: Andrew Gardner

11 January 2003

Blaydon	P - P	Halifax

- Postponed. Game rescheduled to 5 April 2003.

11 January 2003

Darlington Mowden Park	P - P	Bedford Athletic

- Postponed. Game rescheduled to 15 February 2003.

11 January 2003

Liverpool St Helens	P - P	New Brighton

- Postponed. Game rescheduled to 22 March 2003.

11 January 2003

Nuneaton	P - P	Hull Ionians

- Postponed. Game rescheduled to 15 February 2003.

11 January 2003

Preston Grasshoppers	P - P	Dudley Kingswinford

- Postponed. Game rescheduled to 8 March 2003.

11 January 2003

Waterloo	P - P	Tynedale

- Postponed. Game rescheduled to 8 March 2003.

=== Round 18 ===
18 January 2003

Bedford Athletic	15 - 12	Blaydon
	Report

Putnoe Woods
Referee: Andrew Canning

18 January 2003

Broadstreet	15 - 28	Darlington Mowden Park
	Report

Ivor Preece Field
Referee: Mick Reid

18 January 2003

Dudley Kingswinford	22 - 30	New Brighton
	Report

Heathbrook
Referee: Trevor Fisher

18 January 2003

Halifax	26 - 25	Nuneaton
	Report

Ovenden Park
Referee: Graham Hughes

18 January 2003

Hull Ionians	7 - 45	Waterloo
	Report

Brantingham Park
Referee: Brendan Fitzmaurice

18 January 2003

Scunthorpe	20 - 39	Liverpool St Helens
	Report

Heslam Park
Attendance: 250
Referee: Greg Garner

18 January 2003

Tynedale	8 - 26	Preston Grasshoppers
	Report

Tynedale Park
Referee: S Makinson

=== Round 19 ===
25 January 2003

Blaydon	34 - 6	Broadstreet
	Report

Crow Trees
Referee: Chris Seeley

25 January 2003

Darlington Mowden Park	42 - 20	Scunthorpe
	Report

Yiewsley Drive
Referee: Don Helme

25 January 2003

Liverpool St Helens	25 - 12	Dudley Kingswinford
	Report

Moss Lane

25 January 2003

New Brighton	34 - 10	Tynedale
	Report

Hartsfield
Referee: Chris Sharp

25 January 2003

Nuneaton	38 - 6	Bedford Athletic
	Report

Liberty Way
Referee: Nick Williams

25 January 2003

Preston Grasshoppers	43 - 22	Hull Ionians
	Report

Lightfoot Green
Referee: Mike Hamlin

25 January 2003

Waterloo	16 - 13	Halifax
	Report

St Anthony's Road
Referee: Alan Biggs

=== Round 20 ===
1 February 2003

Broadstreet	24 - 34	Nuneaton
	Report

Ivor Preece Field
Referee: S Makinson

1 February 2003

Tynedale	10 - 15	Dudley Kingswinford
	Report

Tynedale Park
Referee: Mick Reid

1 February 2003

Bedford Athletic	P - P	Waterloo

- Postponed. Game rescheduled to 5 April 2003.

1 February 2003

Darlington Mowden Park	P - P	Liverpool St Helens

- Postponed. Game rescheduled to 5 April 2003.

1 February 2003

Halifax	P - P	Preston Grasshoppers

- Postponed. Game rescheduled to 19 April 2003.

1 February 2003

Hull Ionians	P - P	New Brighton

- Postponed. Game rescheduled to 5 April 2003.

1 February 2003

Scunthorpe	P - P	Blaydon

- Postponed. Game rescheduled to 19 April 2003.

=== Round 21 ===
8 February 2003

Blaydon	10 - 17	Darlington Mowden Park
	Report

Crow Trees
Referee: Don Helme

8 February 2003

Dudley Kingswinford	21 - 23	Hull Ionians
	Report

Heathbrook
Referee: David Drury

8 February 2003

New Brighton	31 - 29	Halifax
	Report

Hartsfield
Referee: Chris Seeley

8 February 2003

Liverpool St Helens	19 - 10	Tynedale
	Report

Moss Lane
Referee: Mike Hamlin

8 February 2003

Nuneaton	51 - 5	Scunthorpe
	Report

Liberty Way
Referee: Rob Sawyer

8 February 2003

Preston Grasshoppers	38 - 27	Bedford Athletic
	Report

Lightfoot Green
Referee: Mick Reid

8 February 2003

Waterloo	71 - 19	Broadstreet
	Report

St Anthony's Road
Referee: Brendan Fitzmaurice

=== Rounds 9, 16 & 17 (rescheduled games) ===
15 February 2003

Broadstreet	24 - 18	Liverpool St Helens
	Report

Ivor Preece Field
Referee: Rob Sawyer

- Game rescheduled from 4 January 2003.

15 February 2003

Darlington Mowden Park	22 - 12	Bedford Athletic
	Report

Yiewsley Drive
Referee: Alan Hughes

- Game rescheduled from 11 January 2003.

15 February 2003

Halifax	25 - 22	Dudley Kingswinford
	Report

Ovenden Park
Referee: S Makinson

- Game rescheduled from 9 November 2002.

15 February 2003

Nuneaton	46 - 21	Hull Ionians
	Report

Liberty Way
Referee: Mike Hamlin

- Game rescheduled from 11 January 2003.

15 February 2003

Scunthorpe	0 - 57	Waterloo
	Report

Heslam Park
Referee: Richard Draper

- Game rescheduled from 9 November 2002.

=== Round 22 ===
22 February 2003

Bedford Athletic	12 - 36	Nuneaton
	Report

Putnoe Woods
Referee: Andrew Canning

22 February 2003

Broadstreet	16 - 14	Blaydon
	Report

Ivor Preece Field
Referee: Mike Hamlin

22 February 2003

Dudley Kingswinford	36 - 16	Liverpool St Helens
	Report

Heathbrook
Referee: Dale Newitt

22 February 2003

Halifax	17 - 23	Waterloo
	Report

Ovenden Park
Referee: Andrew Gardner

22 February 2003

Hull Ionians	19 - 21	Preston Grasshoppers
	Report

Brantingham Park
Referee: Don Helme

22 February 2003

Scunthorpe	0 - 60	Darlington Mowden Park
	Report

Heslam Park
Attendance: 275
Referee: David Drury

22 February 2003

Tynedale	13 - 16	New Brighton
	Report

Tynedale Park
Referee: Andrew Vertigan

=== Round 23 ===
1 March 2003

Blaydon	26 - 32	Bedford Athletic
	Report

Crow Trees
Referee: Ged Stone

1 March 2003

Liverpool St Helens	56 - 5	Scunthorpe
	Report

Moss Lane

1 March 2003

New Brighton	33 - 20	Dudley Kingswinford
	Report

Hartsfield
Attendance: 500
Referee: Don Helme

1 March 2003

Nuneaton	41 - 8	Halifax
	Report

Liberty Way
Referee: David Sainsbury

1 March 2003

Preston Grasshoppers	19 - 29	Tynedale
	Report

Lightfoot Green

1 March 2003

Waterloo	41 - 17	Hull Ionians
	Report

St Anthony's Road

1 March 2003

Darlington Mowden Park	P - P	Broadstreet

- Postponed. Game rescheduled to 8 March 2003.

=== Rounds 11, 12, 17 & 23 (rescheduled games) ===
8 March 2003

Darlington Mowden Park	56 - 0	Broadstreet
	Report

Yiewsley Drive
Referee: Andrew Vertigan

- Game rescheduled from 1 March 2003.

8 March 2003

Halifax	0 - 23	Liverpool St Helens
	Report

Ovenden Park
Referee: Chris Seeley

- Game rescheduled from 30 November 2002.

8 March 2003

Preston Grasshoppers	19 - 5	Dudley Kingswinford
	Report

Lightfoot Green
Referee: David Drury

- Game rescheduled from 11 January 2003.

8 March 2003

Scunthorpe	20 - 37	New Brighton
	Report

Heslam Park
Attendance: 250
Referee: Andrew Gardner

- Game rescheduled from 23 November 2002.

8 March 2003

Waterloo	21 - 13	Tynedale
	Report

St Anthony's Road
Referee: Graham Hughes

- Game rescheduled from 11 January 2003.

=== Round 24 ===
15 March 2003

Bedford Athletic	19 - 16	Darlington Mowden Park
	Report

Putnoe Woods
Referee: Mark Rose

15 March 2003

Broadstreet	41 - 27	Scunthorpe
	Report

Ivor Preece Field
Referee: David Drury

15 March 2003

Dudley Kingswinford	25 - 21	Preston Grasshoppers
	Report

Heathbrook
Referee: Rhys Davies

15 March 2003

Halifax	49 - 10	Blaydon
	Report

Ovenden Park
Referee: Andrew Small

15 March 2003

Hull Ionians	18 - 41	Nuneaton
	Report

Brantingham Park
Referee: Ged Stone

15 March 2003

New Brighton	34 - 7	Liverpool St Helens
	Report

Hartsfield
Referee: Brendan Fitzmaurice

15 March 2003

Tynedale	16 - 58	Waterloo
	Report

Tynedale Park
Referee: S Makinson

=== Rounds 15, 16 & 17 (rescheduled games) ===
22 March 2003

Bedford Athletic	67 - 7	Scunthorpe
	Report

Putnoe Woods
Referee: Rob Sawyer

- Game rescheduled from 4 January 2003.

22 March 2003

Blaydon	15 - 48	Tynedale
	Report

Crow Trees
Attendance: 100
Referee: Chris Sharp

- Game rescheduled from 21 December 2002.

22 March 2003

Halifax	21 - 8	Darlington Mowden Park
	Report

Ovenden Park
Referee: Andrew Gardner

- Game rescheduled from 4 January 2003.

22 March 2003

Liverpool St Helens	20 - 36	New Brighton
	Report

Moss Lane

- Game rescheduled from 11 January 2003.

=== Round 25 ===
29 March 2003

Blaydon	29 - 27	Hull Ionians
	Report

Crow Trees
Referee: Rhys Davies

29 March 2003

Darlington Mowden Park	30 - 19	Halifax
	Report

Yiewsley Drive
Referee: Mike Hamlin

29 March 2003

Liverpool St Helens	55 - 17	Broadstreet
	Report

Moss Lane

29 March 2003

Nuneaton	42 - 6	Tynedale
	Report

Liberty Way
Referee: Andrew Gardner

29 March 2003

Preston Grasshoppers	19 - 25	New Brighton
	Report

Lightfoot Green
Referee: Andrew Canning

29 March 2003

Scunthorpe	12 - 19	Bedford Athletic
	Report

Heslam Park
Referee: Greg Garner

29 March 2003

Waterloo	63 - 14	Dudley Kingswinford
	Report

St Anthony's Road
Referee: Andrew Vertigan

=== Rounds 17 & 20 (rescheduled games) ===
5 April 2003

Bedford Athletic	8 - 32	Waterloo
	Report

Putnoe Woods
Referee: D Edmunds

- Game rescheduled from 1 February 2003.

5 April 2003

Blaydon	37 - 38	Halifax
	Report

Crow Trees
Referee: S Makinson

- Game rescheduled from 11 January 2003.

5 April 2003

Darlington Mowden Park	38 - 19	Liverpool St Helens
	Report

Yiewsley Drive
Referee: David Drury

- Game rescheduled from 1 February 2003.

5 April 2003

Hull Ionians	21 - 43	New Brighton
	Report

Brantingham Park
Referee: Guy Steel Bodger

- Game rescheduled from 1 February 2003.

=== Round 26 ===
12 April 2003

Bedford Athletic	31 - 9	Broadstreet
	Report

Putnoe Woods
Referee: Andrew Canning

12 April 2003

Dudley Kingswinford	10 - 12	Nuneaton
	Report

Heathbrook
Referee: Gareth Copsey

12 April 2003

Hull Ionians	13 - 51	Darlington Mowden Park
	Report

Brantingham Park
Referee: Dale Newitt

12 April 2003

Halifax	44 - 27	Scunthorpe
	Report

Ovenden Park

12 April 2003

New Brighton	28 - 15	Waterloo
	Report

Hartsfield
Referee: Chris Sharp

12 April 2003

Preston Grasshoppers	28 - 28	Liverpool St Helens
	Report

Lightfoot Green
Referee: Steve Brown

12 April 2003

Tynedale	21 - 25	Blaydon
	Report

Tynedale Park
Referee: S Makinson

=== Round 20 (rescheduled games) ===
19 April 2003

Halifax	41 - 29	Preston Grasshoppers
	Report

Ovenden Park

- Game rescheduled from 1 February 2003.

19 April 2003

Scunthorpe	26 - 27	Blaydon
	Report

Heslam Park
Attendance: 450
Referee: Brendan Fitzmaurice

- Game rescheduled from 1 February 2003.

=== Promotion play-off ===
The league runners up of National Division Three South and North would meet in a playoff game for promotion to National Division Two. Lydney were runners-up in the south and because they had a better league record than north runners-up, New Brighton, they hosted the play-off match.

26 April 2003

Lydney	21 - 7	New Brighton
	Report

Regentsholme
Referee: Nigel Higginson

== Total season attendances ==
Club	Home Games	Total	Average	Highest	Lowest	% Capacity
Bedford Athletic	0	0	0	0	0	0%
Blaydon	2	250	125	150	100	6%
Broadstreet	0	0	0	0	0	
Darlington Mowden Park	0	0	0	0	0	
Dudley Kingswinford	0	0	0	0	0	0%
Halifax	0	0	0	0	0	
Hull Ionians	0	0	0	0	0	0%
Liverpool St Helens	0	0	0	0	0	0%
New Brighton	1	500	500	500	500	25%
Nuneaton	1	1,200	1,200	1,200	1,200	32%
Preston Grasshoppers	0	0	0	0	0	0%
Scunthorpe	7	2,025	289	450	200	24%
Tynedale	0	0	0	0	0	0%
Waterloo	0	0	0	0	0	0%

== Individual statistics ==
- Note that points scorers includes tries as well as conversions, penalties and drop goals.

=== Top points scorers ===
Rank	Player	Team	Appearances	Points
1	(England) Tony Handley	Waterloo	26	293
2	(England) Mark Bedworth	Darlington Mowden Park	23	254
3	(England) Phillip Belgian	Tynedale	23	224
4	(England) Simon Worsley	Liverpool St Helens	24	211
5	(England) Paul Brett	New Brighton	21	204
6	(England) Nick Cooper	Hull Ionians	25	195
7	(England) Jody Peacock	Nuneaton	25	176
8	(England) Graham Holroyd	Halifax	17	172
9	(England) Jamie Elphick	Bedford Athletic	21	136
10	(Tonga) Sengili Tuihalamaka	Preston Grasshoppers	17	135

=== Top try scorers ===
Rank	Player	Team	Appearances	Tries
1	(England) Jody Peacock	Nuneaton	25	21
1	(England) Gary Marshall	Nuneaton	26	21
2	(England) Oliver Viney	Preston Grasshoppers	25	19
3	(England) Freeman Payne	Waterloo	26	18
4	(England) Rob Hitchmough	Waterloo	24	17
5	(South Africa) Jan Van Deventer	Waterloo	24	16
5	(England) Gary Monaghan	Preston Grasshoppers	25	16
6	(England) Jon Wells	Bedford Athletic	19	14
6	(England) Fergus Griffies	Waterloo	20	14
6	(England) Thomas McLaren	Blaydon	23	14
6	(Tonga) Loa Tupoa	New Brighton	26	14

== Season records ==
=== Team ===
Largest home win — 67 pts

67 - 0 Bedford Athletic at home to Scunthorpe on 22 March 2003

Largest away win — 60 pts

60 - 0 Darlington Mowden Park away to Scunthorpe 22 February 2003

Most points scored — 71 pts

71 - 19 Waterloo at home to Broadstreet on 8 February 2003

Most tries in a match — 11

Bedford Athletic at home to Scunthorpe on 22 March 2003

Most conversions in a match — 8

Waterloo at home to Broadstreet on 8 February 2003

Most penalties in a match — 8

Darlington Mowden Park at home to Hull Ionians on 21 December 2002

Most drop goals in a match — 2

Liverpool St Helens at home to Nuneaton on 23 November 2002

=== Player ===
Most points in a match — 35

(England) Mark Bedworth for Darlington Mowden Park at home to Hull Ionians on 21 December 2002

Most tries in a match — 4 (x3)

(England) Oliver Viney for Preston Grasshoppers at home to Scunthorpe on 16 November 2002
(England) Fergus Griffies for Waterloo away to Scunthorpe on 15 February 2003
(England) Rod Penney for Dudley Kingswinford at home to Liverpool St Helens on 22 February 2003

Most conversions in a match — 8

(England) Tony Handley for Waterloo at home to Broadstreet on 8 February 2003

Most penalties in a match — 8

(England) Mark Bedworth for Darlington Mowden Park at home to Hull Ionians on 21 December 2002

Most drop goals in a match — 2 (x2)

(England) Simon Worsley for Liverpool St Helens at home to Darlington Mowden Park on 2 November 2002
(England) Simon Worsley for Liverpool St Helens at home to Nuneaton on 23 November 2002

=== Attendances ===
Highest — 1,200 (Note: Note that attendance tracking was very poor this season and there may have been higher attendances that were not recorded.)

Nuneaton at home to Broadstreet on 1 November 2002

Lowest — 150 (Note: Note that attendance tracking was very poor this season and it is likely that there were lower attendances that were not recorded.)

Blaydon at home to Nuneaton on 12 October 2002

Highest Average Attendance — N/A (Note: Note that attendance tracking was very poor this season and is impossible to give even a slightly accurate figure for the team with the highest average attendance.)
Lowest Average Attendance — N/A (Note: Note that attendance tracking was very poor this season and is impossible to give even a slightly accurate figure for the team with the lowest average attendance.)

== See also ==
- English Rugby Union Leagues
- English rugby union system
- Rugby union in England
