= 2003–04 National Division Two =

Rugby union competition in England

- Countries: England
- Champions: Sedgley Park
- Runners-up: Nottingham (also promoted)
- Relegated: Lydney, Rugby Lions
- Attendance: 15,663 (average 448 per match) (Note: Note that due to poor record keeping for this year by both clubs and media mean the majority of attendances are missing (see below) - so the total attendance will not be 100% accurate. The average attendance has also been taken into account with the missing games not included.)
- Highest attendance: 1,495 Nottingham at home to Lydney on 10 April 2004
- Lowest attendance: 150 Bracknell at home to Rugby Lions on 6 September 2003
- Top point scorer: (England) Rob Liley; Doncaster 268 points
- Top try scorer: (England) James Aston; Moseley 18 tries

The 2003–04 National Division Two was the fourth version (seventeenth overall) of the third division of the English rugby union league system using the name National Division Two. New teams to the division included Moseley and Rugby Lions who were relegated from the 2002–03 National Division One while promoted teams included Nuneation who came up as champions of the 2002–03 National Division Three North with Rosslyn Park (champions) and Lydney (playoffs) coming up from the 2002–03 National Division Three South. This season would be the last using the league points system of 2 points for a win and 1 point for a draw.

In what was a very tight title race, Sedgley Park Park pipped Nottingham to the league championship by just one point – with both sides winning promotion to the 2004–05 National Division One. It was quite a turn around in Nottingham's case as the club had gone from just escaping relegation the previous season to gaining promotion as the league's runner up. At the other end of the table, promoted Lydney finished bottom with easily the worst record of just two wins and a draw from their twenty-six games. Joining them in the second relegation spot were Rugby Lions who went down on the last day of the season by losing heavily to champions Sedgley Park whilst relegation rivals Rosslyn Park stayed up by virtue of their win against Newbury Blues. Lydney would go into the 2004–05 National Division Three South while Rugby Lions dropped to the 2004–05 National Division Three North in what would be the Lions second successive relegation.

== Participating teams and locations ==
Locations of the 2003-04 National Division Two teams

Team	Stadium	Capacity	City/Area
Bracknell	Lily Hill Park	1,250 (250 seats)	Bracknell, Berkshire
Doncaster	Castle Park	3,075	Doncaster, South Yorkshire
Esher	Molesey Road	3,000	Hersham, Surrey
Harrogate	Claro Road	4,500 (500 seats)	Harrogate, North Yorkshire
Lydney	Regentsholme	3,000 (340 seats)	Lydney, Gloucestershire
Moseley	Bournbrook		Birmingham, West Midlands
Newbury Blues	Monk's Lane	8,000	Newbury, Berkshire
Nottingham	Ireland Avenue	4,990 (590 seats)	Beeston, Nottinghamshire
Nuneaton	Liberty Way	3,800 (500 seats)	Nuneaton, Warwickshire
Rosslyn Park	The Rock	2,000 (630 seats)	Roehampton, London
Rugby Lions	Webb Ellis Road	3,200 (200 seats)	Rugby, Warwickshire
Sedgley Park	Park Lane	3,000	Whitefield, Greater Manchester
Stourbridge	Stourton Park	3,500 (499 seats)	Stourbridge, West Midlands
Wharfedale	The Avenue	2,000	Threshfield, Craven, North Yorkshire

== Final league table ==
2003–04 National Division Two table
Pos	Team	Pld	W	D	L	PF	PA	PD	Pts
1	Sedgley Park (P)	26	20	1	5	658	487	+171	41
2	Nottingham (P)	26	19	2	5	761	535	+226	40
3	Nuneaton	26	17	1	8	655	405	+250	35
4	Doncaster	26	17	0	9	692	487	+205	34
5	Wharfedale	26	13	0	13	484	505	−21	26
6	Esher	26	12	1	13	641	612	+29	25
7	Bracknell	26	12	1	13	494	605	−111	25
8	Newbury Blues	26	12	0	14	589	546	+43	24
9	Stourbridge	26	12	0	14	614	655	−41	24
10	Harrogate	26	11	2	13	668	578	+90	24
11	Moseley	26	11	2	13	535	524	+11	24
12	Rosslyn Park	26	9	1	16	672	646	+26	19
13	Rugby Lions (R)	26	9	0	17	511	697	−186	18
14	Lydney (R)	26	2	1	23	352	1044	−692	5

Updated to match(es) played on 24 April 2004. Source: Rugby Statbunker
(P) Promoted; (R) Relegated

== Results ==
=== Round 1 ===
6 September 2003

Bracknell	29 - 22	Rugby Lions
	Report

Lily Hill Park
Attendance: 150
Referee: Gareth Copesey

6 September 2003

Esher	21 - 23	Newbury
	Report

Molesey Road
Attendance: 400
Referee: Llyr Apgeraint-Roberts

6 September 2003

Moseley	31 - 16	Lydney
	Report

Bournbrook
Attendance: 271
Referee: Paul Dix

6 September 2003

Nottingham	34 - 28	Rosslyn Park
	Report

Ireland Avenue
Attendance: 435
Referee: Chris Sharp

6 September 2003

Sedgley Park	21 - 17	Harrogate
	Report

Park Lane
Attendance: 489
Referee: Andrew Small

6 September 2003

Stourbridge	16 - 6	Doncaster
	Report

Stourton Park
Attendance: 400
Referee: Bruce Robertson

6 September 2003

Wharfedale	26 - 8	Nuneaton
	Report

The Avenue
Attendance: 400
Referee: Brendan Fitzmaurice

=== Round 2 ===
13 September 2003

Doncaster	24 - 28	Rugby Lions
	Report

Castle Park
Referee: Mark Wilson

13 September 2003

Esher	28 - 52	Bracknell
	Report

Molesey Road
Referee: D Edmunds

13 September 2003

Harrogate	39 - 13	Stourbridge
	Report

Claro Road
Referee: Gareth Copsey

13 September 2003

Lydney	0 - 10	Wharfedale
	Report

Regentsholme
Referee: David Grashoff

13 September 2003

Newbury Blues	23 - 16	Nottingham
	Report

Monk's Lane
Referee: David Sainsbury

13 September 2003

Nuneaton	9 - 38	Sedgley Park
	Report

Liberty Way
Referee: Llyr Apgeraint-Roberts

13 September 2003

Rosslyn Park	26 - 18	Moseley
	Report

The Rock
Referee: Andrew Small

=== Round 3 ===
27 September 2003

Bracknell	28 - 22	Doncaster
	Report

Lily Hill Park
Referee: Andrew Small

27 September 2003

Moseley	13 - 10	Newbury Blues
	Report

Bournbrook
Referee: Gareth Copsey

27 September 2003

Nottingham	34 - 34	Esher
	Report

Ireland Avenue
Referee: Tim Miller

27 September 2003

Rugby Lions	8 - 38	Harrogate
	Report

Webb Ellis Road
Referee: Richard Parker-Sedgmore

27 September 2003

Sedgley Park	53 - 20	Lydney
	Report

Park Lane
Referee: D Edmunds

27 September 2003

Stourbridge	14 - 15	Nuneaton
	Report

Stourton Park
Referee: David Sainsbury

27 September 2003

Wharfedale	22 - 19	Rosslyn Park
	Report

The Avenue
Referee: Trevor Fisher

=== Round 4 ===
10 October 2003

Nuneaton	45 - 0	Rugby Lions
	Report

Liberty Way
Referee: Eric Woodmason

11 October 2003

Esher	20 - 13	Moseley
	Report

Molesey Road
Referee: David Sainsbury

11 October 2003

Harrogate	23 - 29	Doncaster
	Report

Claro Road
Referee: Mark Wilson

11 October 2003

Lydney	11 - 33	Stourbridge
	Report

Regentsholme

11 October 2003

Newbury Blues	23 - 24	Wharfedale
	Report

Monk's Lane
Referee: Nick Williams

11 October 2003

Nottingham	28 - 23	Bracknell
	Report

Ireland Avenue

11 October 2003

Rosslyn Park	25 - 36	Sedgeley Park
	Report

The Rock
Referee: Gareth Copsey

=== Round 5 ===
25 October 2003

Bracknell	17 - 39	Harrogate
	Report

Lily Hill Park
Referee: David Sainsbury

25 October 2003

Doncaster	18 - 10	Nuneaton
	Report

Castle Park

25 October 2003

Moseley	26 - 26	Nottingham
	Report

Bournbrook
Referee: Tim Miller

25 October 2003

Rugby Lions	32 - 10	Lydney
	Report

Webb Ellis Road
Referee: Andrew Small

25 October 2003

Sedgley Park	19 - 10	Newbury Blues
	Report

Park Lane
Referee: Dean Richards

25 October 2003

Stourbridge	31 - 28	Rosslyn Park
	Report

Stourton Park
Referee: David Grasshoff

25 October 2003

Wharfedale	26 - 21	Esher
	Report

The Avenue
Referee: Llyr Apgeraint-Roberts

=== Round 6 ===
1 November 2003

Esher	19 - 28	Sedgley Park
	Report

Molesey Road
Referee: Alan Biggs

1 November 2003

Lydney	9 - 49	Doncaster
	Report

Regentsholme
Referee: Nigel Higginson

1 November 2003

Moseley	14 - 14	Bracknell
	Report

Bournbrook
Attendance: 270
Referee: Chris Sharp

1 November 2003

Newbury Blues	26 - 33	Stourbridge
	Report

Monk's Lane
Referee: Gareth Copsey

1 November 2003

Nottingham	23 - 18	Wharfedale
	Report

Ireland Avenue
Referee: Eric Woodmason

1 November 2003

Nuneaton	32 - 34	Harrogate
	Report

Liberty Way
Referee: Paul Dix

1 November 2003

Rosslyn Park	31 - 17	Rugby Lions
	Report

The Rock
Referee: Tim Wigglesworth

=== Round 7 ===
8 November 2003

Bracknell	16 - 17	Nuneaton
	Report

Lily Hill Park
Referee: Tim Miller

8 November 2003

Doncaster	23 - 22	Rosslyn Park
	Report

Castle Park
Referee: Paul Dix

8 November 2003

Harrogate	60 - 13	Lydney
	Report

Claro Road
Referee: Llyr Apgeraint-Roberts

8 November 2003

Rugby Lions	43 - 36	Newbury Blues
	Report

Webb Ellis Road
Referee: David Sainsbury

8 November 2003

Sedgley Park	30 - 20	Nottingham
	Report

Park Lane
Referee: Mark Wilson

8 November 2003

Stourbridge	34 - 28	Esher
	Report

Stourton Park
Referee: Andrew Small

8 November 2003

Wharfedale	3 - 9	Moseley
	Report

The Avenue
Referee: Guy Steel Bodger

=== Round 8 ===
15 November 2003

Esher	22 - 30	Rugby Lions
	Report

Molesey Road
Referee: Richard Parker-Sedgmore

15 November 2003

Lydney	32 - 24	Nuneaton
	Report

Regentsholme
Referee: Gareth Copsey

15 November 2003

Moseley	16 - 23	Sedgley Park
	Report

Bournbrook
Referee: Llyr Apgeraint-Roberts

15 November 2003

Newbury Blues	13 - 42	Doncaster
	Report

Monk's Lane
Attendance: Trevor Fisher

15 November 2003

Nottingham	27 - 24	Stourbridge
	Report

Ireland Avenue
Referee: Brendan Fitzmaurice

15 November 2003

Rosslyn Park	20 - 53	Harrogate
	Report

The Rock
Referee: Dean Richards

15 November 2003

Wharfedale	29 - 13	Bracknell
	Report

The Avenue
Referee: D Edmunds

=== Round 9 ===
22 November 2003

Bracknell	41 - 0	Lydney
	Report

Lily Hill Park
Referee: David Grashoff

22 November 2003

Doncaster	30 - 11	Esher
	Report

Castle Park
Referee: Andrew Vertigan

22 November 2003

Harrogate	22 - 15	Newbury Blues
	Report

Claro Road
Referee: Eric Woodmason

22 November 2003

Nuneaton	48 - 10	Rosslyn Park
	Report

Liberty Way
Referee: David Sainsbury

22 November 2003

Rugby Lions	5 - 42	Nottingham
	Report

Webb Ellis Road
Attendance: 305
Referee: Richard Parker-Sedgmore

22 November 2003

Sedgley Park	11 - 5	Wharfedale
	Report

Park Lane
Referee: Alan Hughes

22 November 2003

Stourbridge	30 - 20	Moseley
	Report

Stourton Park
Referee: Trevor Fisher

=== Round 10 ===
29 November 2003

Esher	8 - 10	Harrogate
	Report

Molesey Road
Attendance: 400
Referee: Gareth Copsey

29 November 2003

Moseley	14 - 9	Rugby Lions
	Report

Bournbrook
Attendance: 300
Referee: Llyr Apgeraint-Roberts

29 November 2003

Newbury Blues	12 - 15	Nuneaton
	Report

Monk's Lane
Attendance: 275
Referee: David Grashoff

29 November 2003

Nottingham	22 - 19	Doncaster
	Report

Ireland Avenue
Attendance: 530
Referee: Richard Parker-Sedgmore

29 November 2003

Rosslyn Park	65 - 24	Lydney
	Report

The Rock
Attendance: 500
Referee: Nick Williams

29 November 2003

Sedgley Park	14 - 21	Bracknell
	Report

Park Lane
Attendance: 320
Referee: Alan Biggs

29 November 2003

Wharfedale	52 - 10	Stourbridge
	Report

The Avenue
Attendance: 450
Referee: Paul Dix

=== Round 11 ===
6 December 2003

Bracknell	23 - 13	Rosslyn Park
	Report

Lily Hill Park
Referee: Kevin Stewart

6 December 2003

Doncaster	20 - 18	Moseley
	Report

Castle Park
Referee: Guy Steel Bodger

6 December 2003

Harrogate	45 - 22	Nottingham
	Report

Claro Road
Referee: Paul Dix

6 December 2003

Lydney	13 - 27	Newbury Blues
	Report

Regentsholme
Referee: David Sainsbury

6 December 2003

Nuneaton	42 - 14	Esher
	Report

Liberty Way
Referee: D Edmunds

6 December 2003

Rugby Lions	30 - 16	Wharfedale
	Report

Webb Ellis Road
Referee: Richard Phillips

6 December 2003

Stourbridge	28 - 32	Sedgley Park
	Report

Stourton Park
Referee: Terry Hall

=== Round 12 ===
13 December 2003

Esher	50 - 11	Lydney
	Report

Molesey Road
Attendance: 350
Referee: Dean Richards

13 December 2003

Moseley	27 - 7	Harrogate
	Report

Bournbrook
Attendance: 263
Referee: Trevor Fisher

13 December 2003

Newbury Blues	23 - 17	Rosslyn Park
	Report

Monk's Lane
Referee: Steve Harland

13 December 2003

Nottingham	10 - 20	Nuneaton
	Report

Ireland Avenue
Referee: Eric Woodmason

13 December 2003

Sedgley Park	46 - 27	Rugby Lions
	Report

Park Lane
Referee: Andrew Vertigan

13 December 2003

Stourbridge	21 - 19	Bracknell
	Report

Stourton Park
Referee: Alan Biggs

13 December 2003

Wharfedale	15 - 12	Doncaster
	Report

The Avenue
Referee: David Sainsbury

=== Round 13 ===
20 December 2003

Bracknell	18 - 17	Newbury Blues
	Report

Lily Hill Park
Referee: Trevor Fisher

20 December 2003

Doncaster	21 - 31	Sedgley Park
	Report

Castle Park
Referee: Gareth Copsey

20 December 2003

Harrogate	15 - 19	Wharfedale
	Report

Claro Road
Attendance: 1,000
Referee: Alan Biggs

20 December 2003

Lydney	15 - 58	Nottingham
	Report

Regentsholme
Referee: Mark Varnon

20 December 2003

Nuneaton	24 - 3	Moseley
	Report

Liberty Way
Referee: Mark Wilson

20 December 2003

Rosslyn Park	0 - 8	Esher
	Report

The Rock
Referee: D Edmunds

20 December 2003

Rugby Lions	13 - 11	Stourbridge
	Report

Webb Ellis Road
Referee: Tim Wigglesworth

=== Round 14 ===
3 January 2004

Esher	26 - 25	Nuneaton
	Report

Molesey Road
Attendance: 400
Referee: Tim Miller

3 January 2004

Moseley	12 - 38	Doncaster
	Report

Bournbrook
Attendance: 379
Referee: Paul Dix

3 January 2004

Newbury Blues	37 - 8	Lydney
	Report

Monk's Lane
Referee: Nick Williams

3 January 2004

Nottingham	25 - 3	Harrogate
	Report

Ireland Avenue
Referee: Trevor Fisher

3 January 2004

Rosslyn Park	72 - 3	Bracknell
	Report

The Rock
Referee: David Sainsbury

3 January 2004

Sedgley Park	23 - 15	Stourbridge
	Report

Park Lane
Referee: Llyr Apgeraint-Roberts

3 January 2004

Wharfedale	23 - 5	Rugby Lions
	Report

The Avenue
Attendance: 550
Referee: Alan Hughes

=== Round 15 ===
10 January 2004

Bracknell	5 - 17	Sedgley Park
	Report

Lily Hill Park

10 January 2004

Doncaster	19 - 21	Nottingham
	Report

Castle Park
Referee: D Edmunds

10 January 2004

Harrogate	21 - 22	Esher
	Report

Claro Road
Referee: Richard Parker-Sedgmore

10 January 2004

Lydney	20 - 27	Rosslyn Park
	Report

Regentsholme
Referee: Andrew Vertigan

10 January 2004

Nuneaton	21 - 16	Newbury Blues
	Report

Liberty Way
Referee: Llyr Apgeraint-Roberts

10 January 2004

Rugby Lions	35 - 24	Moseley
	Report

Webb Ellis Road

10 January 2004

Stourbridge	41 - 22	Wharfedale
	Report

Stourton Park
Referee: David Sainsbury

=== Round 16 ===
17 January 2004

Esher	18 - 29	Doncaster
	Report

Molesey Road
Referee: Richard Phillips

17 January 2004

Lydney	6 - 25	Bracknell
	Report

Regentsholme
Referee: Richard Draper

17 January 2004

Moseley	22 - 33	Stourbridge
	Report

Bournbrook
Attendance: 506
Referee: Nigel Higginson

17 January 2004

Newbury Blues	31 - 17	Harrogate
	Report

Monk's Lane
Referee: Dean Richards

17 January 2004

Nottingham	23 - 0	Rugby Lions
	Report

Ireland Avenue
Referee: Eric Woodmason

17 January 2004

Rosslyn Park	19 - 26	Nuneaton
	Report

The Rock
Referee: Paul Dix

17 January 2004

Wharfedale	13 - 9	Sedgley Park
	Report

The Avenue
Referee: Tim Miller

=== Round 17 ===
24 January 2004

Bracknell	13 - 3	Wharfedale
	Report

Lily Hill Lane
Referee: Gareth Copsey

24 January 2004

Doncaster	37 - 30	Newbury Blues
	Report

Castle Park
Referee: Tim Miller

24 January 2004

Harrogate	35 - 35	Rosslyn Park
	Report

Claro Road
Attendance: 300
Referee: Richard Draper

24 January 2004

Nuneaton	91 - 0	Lydney
	Report

Referee: David Sainsbury

24 January 2004

Rugby Lions	32 - 37	Esher
	Report

Webb Ellis Road
Referee: Nick Williams

24 January 2004

Sedgley Park	7 - 39	Moseley
	Report

Park Lane
Attendance: 346
Referee: D Edmunds

24 January 2004

Stourbridge	18 - 48	Nottingham
	Report

Stourton Park
Referee: Paul Dix

=== Round 18 ===
31 January 2004

Lydney	24 - 13	Harrogate
	Report

Regentsholme
Referee: Tim Beddow

31 January 2004

Moseley	27 - 6	Wharfedale
	Report

Bournbrook
Attendance: 328
Referee: Alan Biggs

31 January 2004

Newbury Blues	16 - 10	Rugby Lions
	Report

Monk's Lane
Referee: Paul Dix

31 January 2004

Nottingham	22 - 17	Sedgley Park
	Report

Ireland Avenue
Referee: Llyr Apgeraint-Roberts

31 January 2004

Nuneaton	19 - 0	Bracknell
	Report

Liberty Way
Referee: Dean Richards

31 January 2004

Rosslyn Park	12 - 25	Doncaster
	Report

The Rock
Referee: Chris Sharp

31 January 2004

Esher	P - P	Stourbridge

- Postponed. Game rescheduled to 21 February 2004.

=== Round 19 ===
7 February 2004

Bracknell	11 - 39	Moseley
	Report

Lily Hill Road
Referee: Tim Miller

7 February 2004

Doncaster	62 - 10	Lydney
	Report

Castle Park
Referee: Alan Hughes

7 February 2004

Harrogate	13 - 13	Nuneaton
	Report

Claro Road
Referee: Llyr Apgeraint-Roberts

7 February 2004

Rugby Lions	17 - 19	Rosslyn Park
	Report

Webb Ellis Road

7 February 2004

Sedgley Park	20 - 14	Esher
	Report

Park Lane
Referee: Eric Woodmason

7 February 2004

Stourbridge	14 - 24	Newbury Blues
	Report

Stourton Park
Referee: Guy Steel Bodger

7 February 2004

Wharfedale	10 - 14	Nottingham
	Report

The Avenue
Referee: Mark Wilson

=== Round 20 ===
14 February 2004

Esher	37 - 16	Wharfedale
	Report

Molesey Road
Referee: Steve Harland

14 February 2004

Harrogate	31 - 10	Bracknell
	Report

Claro Road
Referee: Tim Beddow

14 February 2004

Lydney	13 - 15	Rugby Lions
	Report

Regentsholme
Referee: Eric Woodmason

14 February 2004

Newbury Blues	25 - 18	Sedgley Park
	Report

Monk's Lane
Referee: David Sainsbury

14 February 2004

Nottingham	41 - 25	Moseley
	Report

Ireland Avenue
Attendance: 732
Referee: Richard Phillips

14 February 2004

Nuneaton	18 - 10	Doncaster
	Report

Liberty Way
Referee: Andrew Vertigan

14 February 2004

Rosslyn Park	42 - 8	Stourbridge
	Report

The Rock
Referee: Dean Richards

=== Round 18 (rescheduled game) ===
21 February 2004

Esher	23 - 17	Stourbridge
	Report

Molesey Road
Attendance: 300
Referee: David Grashoff

- Game rescheduled from 31 January 2004.

=== Round 21 ===
28 February 2004

Bracknell	30 - 23	Nottingham
	Report

Lily Hill Park
Referee: Andrew Smith

28 February 2004

Doncaster	31 - 28	Harrogate
	Report

Castle Park
Referee: Tim Wigglesworth

28 February 2004

Moseley	12 - 27	Esher
	Report

Bournbrook
Referee: Mark Wilson

28 February 2004

Sedgley Park	30 - 27	Rosslyn Park
	Report

Park Lane
Referee: Chris Sharp

28 February 2004

Stourbridge	57 - 20	Lydney
	Report

Stourton Park
Referee: D Edmunds

28 February 2004

Rugby Lions	P - P	Nuneaton

- Postponed. Game rescheduled to 5 March 2004.

28 February 2004

Wharfedale	P - P	Newbury Blues

- Postponed. Game rescheduled to 6 March 2004.

=== Round 21 (rescheduled games) ===
5 March 2004

Rugby Lions	12 - 27	Nuneaton
	Report

Webb Ellis
Attendance: 560
Referee: Trevor Fisher

- Game rescheduled from 28 February 2004.

6 March 2004

Wharfedale	26 - 19	Newbury Blues
	Report

The Avenue
Referee: Paul Dix

- Game rescheduled from 28 February 2004.

=== Round 22 ===
13 March 2004

Doncaster	20 - 10	Bracknell
	Report

Castle Park
Referee: Llyr Apgeraint-Roberts

13 March 2004

Esher	26 - 33	Nottingham
	Report

Molesey Road
Referee: Greg Garner

13 March 2004

Harrogate	30 - 35	Rugby Lions
	Report

Claro Road
Referee: Andrew Vertigan

13 March 2004

Lydney	22 - 22	Sedgley Park
	Report

Regentsholme
Referee: Tim Miller

13 March 2004

Newbury Blues	45 - 7	Moseley
	Report

Monk's Lane
Referee: David Grashoff

13 March 2004

Nuneaton	22 - 17	Stourbridge
	Report

Liberty Way
Referee: Alan Hughes

13 March 2004

Rosslyn Park	44 - 10	Wharfedale
	Report

The Rock
Referee: David Sainsbury

=== Round 23 ===
20 March 2004

Moseley	17 - 3	Rosslyn Park
	Report

Bournbrook
Referee: Bruce Robertson

20 March 2004

Nottingham	29 - 5	Newbury
	Report

Ireland Avenue
Referee: Eric Woodmason

20 March 2004

Rugby Lions	13 - 22	Doncaster
	Report

Webb Ellis Road
Referee: Dean Richards

20 March 2004

Sedgley Park	10 - 3	Nuneaton
	Report

Park Lane
Referee: Nigel Higginson

20 March 2004

Stourbridge	25 - 19	Harrogate
	Report

Stourton Park
Referee: Nick Williams

20 March 2004

Wharfedale	35 - 3	Lydney
	Report

The Avenue
Referee: Richard Draper

20 March 2004

Bracknell	P - P	Esher

- Postponed. Game rescheduled to 27 March 2004.

=== Round 23 (rescheduled game) ===
27 March 2004

Bracknell	16 - 35	Esher
	Report

Lily Hill Park
Referee: Richard Phillips

- Game rescheduled from 20 March 2004.

=== Round 24 ===
3 April 2004

Doncaster	27 - 19	Stourbridge
	Report

Castle Park
Attendance: 500
Referee: D Edmunds

3 April 2004

Harrogate	12 - 26	Sedgley Park
	Report

Claro Road
Referee: Steve Lander

3 April 2004

Lydney	8 - 37	Moseley
	Report

Regentsholme
Referee: David Sainsbury

3 April 2004

Newbury Blues	22 - 18	Esher
	Report

Monk's Lane
Referee: Tim Miller

3 April 2004

Nuneaton	39 - 17	Wharfedale
	Report

Liberty Way
Attendance: 500
Referee: Nigel Higginson

3 April 2004

Rosslyn Park	25 - 36	Nottingham
	Report

The Rock
Referee: Andrew Vertigan

3 April 2004

Rugby Lions	15 - 17	Bracknell
	Report

Webb Ellis Road

=== Round 25 ===
10 April 2004

Esher	39 - 13	Rosslyn Park
	Report

Molesey Road
Attendance: 500
Referee: David Grashoff

10 April 2004

Moseley	9 - 18	Nuneaton
	Report

Bournbrook
Attendance: 369
Referee: Trevor Fisher

10 April 2004

Newbury Blues	41 - 15	Bracknell
	Report

Monk's Lane
Referee: Gareth Copsey

10 April 2004

Nottingham	55 - 21	Lydney
	Report

Ireland Avenue
Attendance: Greg Garner
Referee: 1,495

10 April 2004

Sedgley Park	27 - 17	Doncaster
	Report

Park Lane
Attendance: 640
Referee: Tim Beddow

10 April 2004

Stourbridge	32 - 23	Rugby Lions
	Report

Stourton Park
Referee: Nigel Higginson

10 April 2004

Wharfedale	15 - 20	Harrogate
	Report

The Avenue
Referee: Mike Hamlin

=== Round 26 ===
24 April 2004

Bracknell	23 - 20	Stourbridge
	Report

Lily Hill Park
Referee: Alan Biggs

24 April 2004

Doncaster	40 - 23	Wharfedale
	Report

Castle Park
Referee: Tim Wigglesworth

24 April 2004

Harrogate	24 - 42	Moseley
	Report

Claro Road

24 April 2004

Lydney	23 - 35	Esher
	Report

Regentsholme
Referee: Nick Williams

24 April 2004

Nuneaton	24 - 29	Nottingham
	Report

Liberty Way

24 April 2004

Rosslyn Park	30 - 20	Newbury Blues
	Report

The Rock
Referee: David Sainsbury

24 April 2004

Rugby Lions	35 - 50	Sedgley Park
	Report

Webb Ellis Road
Referee: David Grashoff

== Total season attendances ==
Club	Home Games	Total	Average	Highest	Lowest	% Capacity
Bracknell	1	150	150	150	150	12%
Doncaster	1	500	500	500	500	16%
Esher	6	2,100	350	500	150	12%
Harrogate	2	1,300	650	1,000	300	14%
Lydney	0	0	N/A	N/A	N/A	
Moseley	8	2,686	336	506	263	
Newbury Blues	1	275	275	275	275	3%
Nottingham	4	3,192	798	1,495	435	16%
Nuneaton	1	500	500	500	500	13%
Rosslyn Park	1	500	500	500	500	25%
Rugby Lions	2	865	433	560	305	14%
Sedgley Park	4	1,795	449	640	320	15%
Stourbridge	1	400	400	400	400	11%
Wharfedale	3	1,400	467	550	400	23%

== Individual statistics ==
- Note that points scorers includes tries as well as conversions, penalties and drop goals.

=== Top points scorers ===
Rank	Player	Team	Appearances	Points
1	(England) Rob Liley	Doncaster	22	268
2	(England) Sam Howard	Rosslyn Park	26	267
3	(England) Neil Hallett	Bracknell	26	239
4	(Scotland) Neil Stenhouse	Nottingham	20	238
5	(England) Lee Cholewa	Harrogate	24	222
6	(England) Ben Harvey	Stourbridge	19	210
7	(England) Jody Peacock	Nuneaton	24	201
8	(England) Adam Westall	Lydney	25	180
9	(South Africa) Ryno Veckermann	Sedgley Park	25	177
10	(England) Jonathon Gregory	Esher	15	164

=== Top try scorers ===
Rank	Player	Team	Appearances	Tries
1	(England) James Aston	Moseley	24	18
2	(England) Nathan Bressington	Stourbridge	14	17
2	(England) Jody Peacock	Nuneaton	24	17
3	(England) Jamie Barker	Harrogate	26	16
4	(England) James Justice	Rosslyn Park	24	15
5	(England) Jordan Hands	Nuneaton	14	13
5	(Wales) Nick Wakeley	Doncaster	23	13
6	(England) Nick Hill	Nuneaton	14	12
6	(England) James Tapster	Harrogate	25	12
6	(England) Ross Bullough	Sedgley Park	26	12

== Season records ==
=== Team ===
Largest home win — 91 pts

91 - 0 Nuneaton at home to Lydney on 24 January 2004

Largest away win — 43 pts

58 - 15 Nottingham away to Lydney on 20 December 2003

Most points scored — 91 pts

91 - 0 Nuneaton at home to Lydney on 24 January 2004

Most tries in a match — 15

Nuneaton at home to Lydney on 24 January 2004

Most conversions in a match — 8

Nuneaton at home to Lydney on 24 January 2004

Most penalties in a match — 8

Stourbridge at home to Rosslyn Park on 25 October 2003

Most drop goals in a match — 2

Bracknell away to Sedgley Park on 29 November 2003

=== Player ===
Most points in a match — 32

(England) Sam Howard for Rosslyn Park at home to Bracknell on 3 January 2004

Most tries in a match — 5

(England) John Carter for Doncaster at home to Lydney on 7 February 2004

Most conversions in a match — 8

(England) Peter Glackin for Nuneaton at home to Lydney on 24 January 2004

Most penalties in a match — 8

(England) Ben Harvey for Stourbridge at home to Rosslyn Park on 25 October 2003

Most drop goals in a match — 2

(England) Neil Hallett for Bracknell away to Sedgley Park on 29 November 2003

=== Attendances ===
Highest — 1,495 (Note: Note that attendance tracking was very poor this season and there may have been higher attendances that were not recorded.)

Nottingham at home to Lydney on 10 April 2004

Lowest — 150 (Note: Note that attendance tracking was very poor this season and it is likely that there were lower attendances that were not recorded.)

Bracknell at home to Rugby Lions on 6 September 2003

Highest Average Attendance — 798 (Note: Note that attendance tracking was very poor this season and is impossible to give an accurate figure for the team with the highest average attendance.)

Nottingham

Lowest Average Attendance — 150 (Note: Note that attendance tracking was very poor this season and is impossible to give an accurate figure for the team with the lowest average attendance.)

Bracknell

== See also ==
- English Rugby Union Leagues
- English rugby union system
- Rugby union in England
