= Charles Faithfull =

English rugby union player

- Full name: Charles Kirke Tindall Faithfull
- Born: 6 January 1903 Surrey, England
- Died: 8 August 1979 (aged 76)
- School: Wellington College

Rugby union career
- Position: Prop
International career
Years	Team	Apps	(Points)
1924–26	England	3	(0)

Charles Kirke Tindall Faithfull (6 January 1903 – 8 August 1979) was an English international rugby union player.

Faithfull was the son of an Indian Army lieutenant colonel and attended Wellington College.

A front row forward, Faithfull was known to his teammates as "Chubby", while opponents were said to refer to him as "The Mad Bull". He played for the Army, Combined Services, Harlequins, Halifax and Yorkshire. His career included three England caps, across the 1924 and 1926 Five Nations Championships.

Faithfull was commissioned in the Duke of Wellington's Regiment. Later rising to the rank of Lieutenant Colonel, commanding the 2nd Battalion of the regiment in WW2.

== See also ==
- List of England national rugby union players
