= Gordon Sargent (rugby union) =

England international rugby union player

- Full name: Gordon Alan Frank Sargent
- Born: 18 October 1949 Gloucester, England
- Died: 25 June 2013 (aged 63)

Rugby union career
- Position: Prop
International career
Years	Team	Apps	(Points)
1981	England	1	(0)

Gordon Alan Frank Sargent (18 October 1949 - 25 June 2013) was an English rugby union international.

Sargent grew up in the town of Lydney near Gloucester and attended Lydney Secondary School.

A prop, Sargent spent nine seasons at his hometown club Lydney RFC, before crossing to Gloucester in 1976. He featured in two John Player Cup title wins at Gloucester and was a Gloucestershire county captain. His only England cap was earned off the bench against Ireland at Lansdowne Road in the 1981 Five Nations, after an injury to Phil Blakeway.

== See also ==
- List of England national rugby union players
