= Bev Dovey =

England international rugby union player (1938–2024)

- Full name: Beverley Alfred Dovey
- Born: 24 October 1938 Forest of Dean, England
- Died: 12 January 2024 (aged 85)

Rugby union career
- Position: Prop
International career
Years	Team	Apps	(Points)
1963	England	2	(0)

Beverley Alfred Dovey (24 October 1938 – 12 January 2024) was an English rugby union international.

Born in the Forest of Dean, Dovey was a prop and made his debut for Lydney while a Lydney Grammar student. After school, he attended Leeds University and played his rugby for Roundhay, during which time he was a Yorkshire county representative. He continued his studies at Christ's College, Cambridge and attained a blue in the 1960 Varsity Match.

Dovey, a schoolteacher by profession, moved several times during his career for work and was capped by England while teaching at Merchant Taylors' School, from Rosslyn Park. He appeared twice for England in their title-winning 1963 Five Nations campaign, against Wales at Cardiff and Ireland at Lansdowne Road.

Between 1965 and 1970, Dovey played 184 1st XV games for Bristol. He was captain of the Western Counties side which defeated the touring Wallabies in 1967 and also led his native Gloucestershire in county fixtures.

Bev Dovey died on 12 January 2024, at the age of 85. He was the father-in-law of Irish professional rugby player David Blaney.

== See also ==
- List of England national rugby union players
