= 2002–03 National Division Three South =

Rugby union competition in England

- Countries: England
- Champions: Rosslyn Park
- Runners-up: Lydney (also promoted)
- Relegated: Camberley, Havant
- Attendance: N/A (Note: Due to extremely poor coverage and reporting by the media for this season there is not enough attendance data for the league to give an accurate figure.)
- Top point scorer: (England) Adam Westall (Lydney); 373 points
- Top try scorer: (England) Andy Thorpe (North Walsham); 21 tries

The 2002–03 National Division Three South was the third season (sixteenth overall) of the fourth division (south) of the English domestic rugby union competition using the name National Division Three South. New teams to the division included Rosslyn Park who were relegated from the 2001–02 National Division Two while Havant (champions) and Basingstoke (playoffs) were promoted from London Division 1 along with champions of South West Division 1 – Weston-super-Mare. The league system was 2 points for a win and 1 point for a draw. The league system was 2 points for a win and 1 point for a draw with the league champions going straight up into National Division Two and the runners up playing a playoff against the runners up from National Division Three North for the final promotion place.

By the end of the season, Rosslyn Park made an instant return to National Division Two by winning the league championship, beating runners up Lydney to the title by virtue of just two points. Lydney would join Rosslyn Park in the 2003–04 National Division Two by winning their playoff game against the 2002–03 National Division Three North runners up New Brighton. At the other end of the table, Camberley were comfortable the worst team in the division with 26 defeats out of the 26 games played and over 1,000 points conceded. Newly promoted Havant made a much better fight out of it in what was a very close relegation scrap, winning their last 3 games but eventually going down with only 2 points separating them from 9th placed Tabard. Camberley would drop down to London Division 1 while Havant went back into South West Division 1.

== Participating teams and locations ==
Locations of the 2002-03 National Division Three South teams
Greater London National Division Three South clubs

Team	Stadium	Capacity	City/Area
Barking	Goresbrook	1,000	Becontree, Dagenham, London
Basingstoke	Down Grange	2,500 (250 seats)	Basingstoke, Hampshire
Blackheath	Rectory Field	3,500 (500 seats)	Blackheath, London
Camberley	Watchetts Recreation Ground		Camberley, Surrey
Havant	Hook's Lane	2,000 (200 seats)	Havant, Hampshire
Lydney	Regentsholme	3,000 (340 seats)	Lydney, Gloucestershire
North Walsham	Norwich Road	1,200	Scottow, North Walsham, Norfolk
Old Colfeians	Horn Park		Lee, London
Old Patesians	Everest Road		Cheltenham, Gloucestershire
Redruth	The Recreation Ground	3,500 (580 seats)	Redruth, Cornwall
Rosslyn Park	The Rock	2,000 (630 seats)	Roehampton, London
Tabard	Cobden Hill		Radlett, Hertfordshire
Westcombe Park	Goddington Dene	3,200	Orpington, London
Weston-super-Mare	Recreation Ground	3,000	Weston-super-Mare, Somerset

== Final league table ==
2002-03 National Division Three South table
Pos	Team	Pld	W	D	L	PF	PA	PD	Pts	Qualification
1	Rosslyn Park (C)	26	24	0	2	1055	395	+660	48	Promoted
2	Lydney (P)	26	23	0	3	695	422	+273	46	Promotion play-off
3	Blackheath	26	17	1	8	616	479	+137	35	
4	North Walsham	26	16	0	10	636	479	+157	32	
5	Old Patesians	26	14	0	12	644	544	+100	28	
6	Weston-super-Mare	26	13	0	13	476	512	−36	26	
7	Redruth	26	12	1	13	583	588	−5	25	
8	Barking	26	11	2	13	473	578	−105	24	
9	Old Colfeians	26	10	1	15	501	677	−176	21	
10	Tabard	26	10	0	16	531	571	−40	20	
11	Westcombe Park	26	10	0	16	580	678	−98	20	
12	Basingstoke	26	10	0	16	603	729	−126	20	
13	Havant (R)	26	9	1	16	672	567	+105	19	Relegated
14	Camberley (R)	26	0	0	26	270	1116	−846	0	Relegated

Updated to match(es) played on 26-04-2003. Source: englandrugby.com
(C) Champions; (P) Promoted; (R) Relegated

== Results ==
=== Round 1 ===
31 August 2002

Havant	43 - 32	Old Patesians
	Report

Hook's Lane
Referee: Terry Hall

31 August 2002

Lydney	18 - 16	Westcombe Park
	Report

Regentsholme
Referee: Andrew Pearce

31 August 2002

North Walsham	42 - 8	Camberley
	Report

Norwich Road
Referee: Mark Varnon

31 August 2002

Redruth	13 - 27	Blackheath
	Report

The Recreation Ground
Attendance: 600
Referee: Steve Harland

31 August 2002

Rosslyn Park	29 - 13	Old Colfeians
	Report

The Rock
Attendance: 400
Referee: Rowan Kitt

31 August 2002

Tabard	25 - 28	Basingstoke
	Report

Cobden Hill
Attendance: 250
Referee: Andrew Gardner

31 August 2002

Weston-super-Mare	30 - 25	Barking
	Report

Recreation Ground
Attendance: 250
Referee: Gareth Copsey

=== Round 2 ===
7 September 2002

Barking	9 - 13	Blackheath
	Report

Goresbrook
Attendance: 300
Referee: Andrew Canning

7 September 2002

Camberley	14 - 17	Weston-super-Mare
	Report

Watchetts Recreation Ground
Attendance: 200
Referee: Paul Dickens

7 September 2002

Lydney	41 - 20	Old Colfeians
	Report

Regentsholme
Referee: D May

7 September 2002

North Walsham	28 - 10	Tabard
	Report

Norwich Road
Referee: Mark Varnon

7 September 2002

Old Patesians	34 - 13	Basingstoke
	Report

Everest Road
Attendance: 300
Referee: Paul Dix

7 September 2002

Redruth	21 - 29	Rosslyn Park
	Report

The Recreation Ground
Attendance: 650
Referee: Tim Beddow

7 September 2002

Westcombe Park	30 - 18	Havant
	Report

Goddington Dene
Referee: Rob Sawyer

=== Round 3 ===
14 September 2002

Basingstoke	14 - 29	Westcombe Park
	Report

Down Grange
Referee: Gareth Copsey

14 September 2002

Blackheath	56 - 0	Camberley
	Report

Rectory Field
Referee: Darryl Chapman

14 September 2002

Havant	36 - 12	Old Colfeians
	Report

Hook's Lane
Referee: Steve Harland

14 September 2002

Lydney	43 - 22	Redruth
	Report

Regentsholme
Referee: D Edmunds

14 September 2002

Rosslyn Park	57 - 22	Barking
	Report

The Rock
Attendance: 400
Referee: Mark Varnon

14 September 2002

Tabard	27 - 26	Old Patesians
	Report

Cobden Hill
Attendance: 200
Referee: Guy Steel Bodger

14 September 2002

Weston-super-Mare	15 - 16	North Walsham
	Report

Recreation Ground
Referee: G O'Hara

=== Round 4 ===
28 September 2002

Barking	13 - 20	Lydney
	Report

Goresbrook
Attendance: 250
Referee: Andrew Canning

28 September 2002

Camberley	8 - 40	Rosslyn Park
	Report

Watchetts Recreation Ground
Attendance: 250
Referee: Rowan Kitt

28 September 2002

North Walsham	45 - 6	Blackheath
	Report

Norwich Road
Attendance: 350
Referee: Andrew Vertigan

28 September 2002

Old Colfeians	41 - 22	Basingstoke
	Report

Horn Park
Attendance: 300
Referee: Doug Chapman

28 September 2002

Redruth	39 - 16	Havant
	Report

The Recreation Ground
Attendance: 600

28 September 2002

Westcombe Park	7 - 35	Old Patesians
	Report

Goddington Dene
Attendance: 350
Referee: Mark Varnon

28 September 2002

Weston-super-Mare	23 - 5	Tabard
	Report

Recreation Ground
Attendance: 250
Referee: Chris Healey

=== Round 5 ===
12 October 2002

Basingstoke	50 - 15	Redruth
	Report

Down Grange
Referee: Dean Richards

12 October 2002

Blackheath	22 - 19	Weston-super-Mare
	Report

Rectory Field
Referee: Rob Sawyer

12 October 2002

Havant	49 - 13	Barking
	Report

Hook's Lane
Referee: D May

12 October 2002

Lydney	68 - 13	Camberley
	Report

Regentsholme
Referee: Bruce Robertson

12 October 2002

Old Patesians	34 - 10	Old Colfeians
	Report

Everest Road
Referee: Gareth Copsey

12 October 2002

Rosslyn Park	37 - 10	North Walsham
	Report

The Rock
Referee: Richard Parker-Sedgmore

12 October 2002

Tabard	5 - 25	Westcombe Park
	Report

Cobden Hill
Referee: Guy Steel Bodger

=== Round 6 ===
19 October 2002

Camberley	5 - 48	Havant
	Report

Watchetts Recreation Ground
Attendance: Craig Pocock

19 October 2002

Old Colfeians	27 - 21	Westcombe Park
	Report

Horn Park
Referee: Keith Lewis

19 October 2002

Redruth	12 - 37	Old Patesians
	Report

The Recreation Ground
Referee: R Steggall

19 October 2002

Barking	P - P	Basingstoke

- Postponed. Game rescheduled to 28 December 2002.

19 October 2002

Blackheath	P - P	Tabard

- Postponed. Game rescheduled to 28 December 2002.

19 October 2002

North Walsham	P - P	Lydney

- Postponed. Game rescheduled to 28 December 2002.

19 October 2002

Weston-super-Mare	P - P	Rosslyn Park

- Postponed. Game rescheduled to 28 December 2002.

=== Round 7 ===
26 October 2002

Basingstoke	43 - 15	Camberley
	Report

Down Grange
Attendance: 250
Referee: Guy Steel Bodger

26 October 2002

Havant	30 - 39	North Walsham
	Report

Hook's Lane
Attendance: 300
Referee: Mark Varnon

26 October 2002

Lydney	26 - 9	Weston-super-Mare
	Report

Regentsholme
Referee: Paul Dickens

26 October 2002

Old Colfeians	20 - 22	Tabard
	Report

Horn Park
Referee: Paul Kimber

26 October 2002

Old Patesians	10 - 0	Barking
	Report

Everest Road
Referee: Andrew Bickle

26 October 2002

Rosslyn Park	55 - 14	Blackheath
	Report

The Rock
Referee: Rowan Kitt

26 October 2002

Westcombe Park	53 - 29	Redruth
	Report

Goddington Dene
Referee: Rob Sawyer

=== Round 8 ===
2 November 2002

Barking	24 - 6	Westcombe Park
	Report

Goresbrook
Referee: Andrew Small

2 November 2002

Blackheath	22 - 17	Lydney
	Report

Rectory Field
Referee: Richard Parker-Sedgmore

2 November 2002

Camberley	5 - 40	Old Patesians
	Report

Watchetts Recreation Ground
Referee: Dean Richards

2 November 2002

North Walsham	34 - 10	Basingstoke
	Report

Norwich Road
Referee: S Makinson

2 November 2002

Redruth	24 - 26	Old Colfeians
	Report

The Recreation Ground
Referee: Steve Harland

2 November 2002

Tabard	18 - 26	Rosslyn Park
	Report

Cobden Hill
Referee: Andrew Pearce

2 November 2002

Weston-super-Mare	16 - 5	Havant
	Report

Recreation Ground
Referee: D May

=== Round 9 ===
9 November 2002

Basingstoke	24 - 50	Barking
	Report

Down Grange
Attendance: 250
Referee: Bruce Robertson

9 November 2002

Havant	50 - 0	Camberley
	Report

Hook's Lane
Attendance: 300
Referee: Richard Parker-Sedgmore

9 November 2002

Old Patesians	16 - 15	Redruth
	Report

Everest Road
Attendance: 400
Referee: Mark Varnom

9 November 2002

Tabard	32 - 16	Blackheath
	Report

Cobden Hill
Attendance: 180
Referee: David Max

9 November 2002

Westcombe Park	33 - 13	Old Colfeians
	Report

Goddington Dene
Attendance: 400
Referee: Greg Garner

9 November 2002

Lydney	P - P	North Walsham

- Postponed. Game rescheduled to 15 February 2003.

9 November 2002

Rosslyn Park	P - P	Weston-super-Mare

- Postponed. Game rescheduled to 15 February 2003.

=== Round 10 ===
16 November 2002

Barking	35 - 15	Havant
	Report

Goresbrook
Attendance: 200
Referee: Greg Garner

16 November 2002

North Walsham	10 - 17	Rosslyn Park
	Report

Norwich Road
Attendance: 500
Referee: Bruce Robertson

16 November 2002

Old Colfeians	18 - 14	Old Patesians
	Report

Horn Park
Attendance: 200
Referee: Steve Brown

16 November 2002

Redruth	33 - 6	Basingstoke
	Report

The Recreation Ground
Attendance: 500

16 November 2002

Westcombe Park	22 - 11	Tabard
	Report

Goddington Dene
Attendance: 250
Referee: Paul Dickens

16 November 2002

Weston-super-Mare	30 - 11	Blackheath
	Report

Recreation Ground
Attendance: 200
Referee: Guy Steel Bodger

16 November 2002

Camberley	P - P	Lydney

- Postponed. Game rescheduled to 22 March 2003.

=== Round 11 ===
23 November 2002

Basingstoke	19 - 21	Old Colfeians
	Report

Down Grange
Attendance: 200
Referee: Llyr Apgeraint-Roberts

23 November 2002

Blackheath	14 - 24	North Walsham
	Report

Rectory Field
Referee: Mark Varnon

23 November 2002

Havant	9 - 13	Redruth
	Report

Hook's Lane
Referee: Darryl Chapman

23 November 2002

Lydney	12 - 7	Barking
	Report

Regentsholme
Referee: Guy Steel Bodger

23 November 2002

Old Patesians	46 - 5	Westcombe Park
	Report

Everest Road
Referee: Al Klemp

23 November 2002

Tabard	17 - 5	Weston-super-Mare
	Report

Cobden Hill
Referee: Richard Parker-Sedgmore

23 November 2002

Rosslyn Park	P - P	Camberley

- Postponed. Game rescheduled to 8 March 2003.

=== Round 12 ===
30 November 2002

Barking	7 - 38	Rosslyn Park
	Report

Goresbrook
Referee: Richard Parker-Sedgmore

30 November 2002

Camberley	3 - 17	Blackheath
	Report

Watchetts Recreation Ground

30 November 2002

North Walsham	18 - 6	Weston-super-Mare
	Report

Norwich Road
Referee: Andrew Canning

30 November 2002

Old Colfeians	17 - 21	Havant
	Report

Horn Park
Referee: Dean Richards

30 November 2002

Old Patesians	29 - 28	Tabard
	Report

Everest Road
Referee: D May

30 November 2002

Redruth	5 - 20	Lydney
	Report

The Recreation Ground
Referee: Bruce Robertson

30 November 2002

Westcombe Park	27 - 44	Basingstoke
	Report

Goddington Dene
Referee: Rob Sawyer

=== Round 13 ===
7 December 2002

Basingstoke	49 - 8	Old Patesians
	Report

Down Grange
Referee: Andrew Canning

7 December 2002

Blackheath	32 - 5	Barking
	Report

Rectory Field
Referee: Mark Rose

7 December 2002

Havant	16 - 30	Westcombe Park
	Report

Hook's Lane
Referee: Paul Dix

7 December 2002

Old Colfeians	12 - 26	Lydney
	Report

Horn Park
Referee: Greg Garner

7 December 2002

Rosslyn Park	36 - 17	Redruth
	Report

The Rock
Referee: Alan Biggs

7 December 2002

Tabard	31 - 7	North Walsham
	Report

Cobden Hill
Referee: Paul Dickens

7 December 2002

Weston-super-Mare	56 - 3	Camberley
	Report

Recreation Ground
Referee: D May

=== Round 14 ===
14 December 2002

Barking	10 - 7	Weston-super-Mare
	Report

Goresbrook
Referee: Gareth Copsey

14 December 2002

Basingstoke	7 - 30	Tabard
	Report

Down Grange
Referee: Guy Steel Bodger

14 December 2002

Blackheath	35 - 17	Redruth
	Report

Rectory Field
Referee: Dean Richards

14 December 2002

Camberley	20 - 45	North Walsham
	Report

Watchetts Recreation Ground
Referee: Greg Garner

14 December 2002

Old Colfeians	10 - 67	Rosslyn Park
	Report

Horn Park
Referee: Mark Varnon

14 December 2002

Old Patesians	23 - 14	Havant
	Report

Everest Road
Referee: Steve Harland

14 December 2002

Westcombe Park	22 - 23	Lydney
	Report

Goddington Dene
Attendance: 300
Referee: Richard Parker-Sedgmore

=== Round 15 ===
21 December 2002

Blackheath	35 - 7	Old Colfeians
	Report

Rectory Field
Referee: David Sainsbury

21 December 2002

Havant	19 - 21	Basingstoke
	Report

Hook's Lane
Referee: Nick Cousins

21 December 2002

Lydney	24 - 3	Old Patesians
	Report

Regentsholme
Referee: Llyr Apgeraint-Roberts

21 December 2002

North Walsham	38 - 0	Barking
	Report

Norwich Road
Referee: Guy Steel Bodger

21 December 2002

Rosslyn Park	82 - 17	Westcombe Park
	Report

The Rock
Referee: Andrew Canning

21 December 2002

Tabard	58 - 7	Camberley
	Report

Cobden Hill
Referee: D May

21 December 2002

Weston-super-Mare	14 - 5	Redruth
	Report

Recreation Ground
Referee: Richard Parker-Sedgmore

=== Round 6 (rescheduled games) ===
28 December 2002

Barking	11 - 39	Basingstoke
	Report

Goresbrook
Referee: Rob Sawyer

- Game rescheduled from 19 October 2002.

28 December 2002

Blackheath	19 - 10	Tabard
	Report

Rectory Field
Referee: Nick Cousins

- Game rescheduled from 19 October 2002.

28 December 2002

North Walsham	15 - 25	Lydney
	Report

Norwich Road
Referee: Paul Dickens

- Game rescheduled from 19 October 2002.

28 December 2002

Weston-super-Mare	13 - 18	Rosslyn Park
	Report

Recreation Ground
Referee: Andrew Pearce

- Game rescheduled from 19 October 2002.

=== Round 16 ===
4 January 2003

Basingstoke	3 - 19	Lydney
	Report

Down Grange
Referee: Richard Parker-Sedgmore

4 January 2003

Barking	24 - 20	Camberley
	Report

Goresbrook
Referee: Rowan Kitt

4 January 2003

Havant	22 - 23	Tabard
	Report

Hook's Lane
Referee: D May

4 January 2003

Redruth	18 - 12	North Walsham
	Report

The Recreation Ground
Referee: Mark Varnon

4 January 2003

Rosslyn Park	49 - 13	Old Patesians
	Report

The Rock
Referee: Guy Steel Bodger

4 January 2003

Westcombe Park	20 - 34	Blackheath
	Report

Goddington Dene
Referee: Richard Phillips

4 January 2003

Old Colfeians	P - P	Weston-super-Mare

- Postponed. Game rescheduled for 8 March 2003.

=== Round 17 ===
11 January 2003

Blackheath	27 - 15	Old Patesians
	Report

Rectory Field
Attendance: 300
Referee: Gareth Copsey

11 January 2003

Rosslyn Park	77 - 5	Basingstoke
	Report

The Rock
Referee: David Sainsbury

11 January 2003

Camberley	P - P	Redruth

- Postponed. Game rescheduled to 15 February 2003.

11 January 2003

Lydney	P - P	Havant

- Postponed. Game rescheduled to 8 March 2003.

11 January 2003

North Walsham	P - P	Old Colfeians

- Postponed. Game rescheduled to 22 March 2003.

11 January 2003

Tabard	P - P	Barking

- Postponed. Game rescheduled to 15 February 2003.

11 January 2003

Weston-super-Mare	P - P	Westcombe Park

- Postponed. Game rescheduled to 22 March 2003.

=== Round 18 ===
18 January 2003

Basingstoke	0 - 24	Blackheath
	Report

Down Grange
Referee: Bruce Robertson

18 January 2003

Havant	15 - 44	Rosslyn Park
	Report

Hook's Lane
Referee: Gareth Copsey

18 January 2003

Lydney	15 - 6	Tabard
	Report

Regentsholme
Referee: Paul Dickens

18 January 2003

Old Colfeians	39 - 3	Camberley
	Report

Horn Park
Referee: Guy Steel Bodger

18 January 2003

Old Patesians	27 - 41	Weston-super-Mare
	Report

Everest Road
Referee: D May

18 January 2003

Redruth	18 - 16	Barking
	Report

The Recreation Ground
Referee: Paul Dix

18 January 2003

Westcombe Park	16 - 29	North Walsham
	Report

Goddington Dene
Referee: Andrew Vertigan

=== Round 19 ===
25 January 2003

Barking	32 - 17	Old Colfeians
	Report

Goresbrook
Referee: Rob Sawyer

25 January 2003

Blackheath	22 - 22	Havant
	Report

Rectory Field
Referee: Paul Dickens

25 January 2003

Camberley	10 - 48	Westcombe Park
	Report

Watchetts Recreation Ground
Referee: D May

25 January 2003

North Walsham	31 - 3	Old Patesians
	Report

Norwich Road
Referee: Andrew Vertigan

25 January 2003

Rosslyn Park	20 - 12	Lydney
	Report

The Rock
Referee: Tim Miller

25 January 2003

Tabard	25 - 22	Redruth
	Report

Cobden Hill
Referee: Steve Harland

25 January 2003

Weston-super-Mare	29 - 22	Basingstoke
	Report

Recreation Ground
Referee: Andrew Pearce

=== Round 20 ===
1 February 2003

Lydney	27 - 23	Blackheath
	Report

Regentsholme
Referee: Guy Steel Bodger

1 February 2003

Old Colfeians	13 - 16	Redruth
	Report

Horn Park
Referee: Paul Dickens

1 February 2003

Old Patesians	60 - 14	Camberley
	Report

Everest Road
Referee: Greg Garner

1 February 2003

Westcombe Park	25 - 11	Barking
	Report

Goddington Dene
Referee: Andrew Canning

1 February 2003

Basingstoke	P - P	North Walsham

- Postponed. Game rescheduled to 8 March 2003.

1 February 2003

Havant	P - P	Weston-super-Mare

- Postponed. Game rescheduled to 5 April 2003.

1 February 2003

Rosslyn Park	P - P	Tabard

- Postponed. Game rescheduled to 22 March 2003.

=== Round 21 ===
8 February 2003

Barking	13 - 8	Old Patesians
	Report

Goresbrook
Referee: Guy Steel Bodger

8 February 2003

Blackheath	13 - 0	Rosslyn Park
	Report

Rectory Field
Referee: Andrew Canning

8 February 2003

Camberley	15 - 35	Basingstoke
	Report

Watchetts Recreation Ground
Referee: Stuart Clotworth

8 February 2003

North Walsham	19 - 8	Havant
	Report

Norwich Road
Referee: Mark Rose

8 February 2003

Redruth	30 - 19	Westcombe Park
	Report

The Recreation Ground
Attendance: 500
Referee: Richard Parker-Sedgmore

8 February 2003

Tabard	8 - 23	Old Colfeians
	Report

Cobden Hill
Referee: Richard Draper

8 February 2003

Weston-super-Mare	16 - 26	Lydney
	Report

Recreation Ground
Referee: Steve Haarland

=== Rounds 9 & 17 (rescheduled games) ===
15 February 2003

Camberley	13 - 36	Redruth
	Report

Watchetts Recreation Ground
Referee: Andrew Canning

- Game rescheduled from 11 January 2003.

15 February 2003

Lydney	27 - 7	North Walsham
	Report

Regentsholme
Referee: Richard Parker-Sedgmore

- Game rescheduled from 9 November 2002.

15 February 2003

Rosslyn Park	45 - 19	Weston-super-Mare
	Report

The Rock
Referee: Mark Rose

- Game rescheduled from 9 November 2002.

15 February 2003

Tabard	6 - 8	Barking
	Report

Cobden Hill
Referee: Paul Dickens

- Game rescheduled from 11 January 2003.

=== Round 22 ===
22 February 2003

Basingstoke	28 - 9	Weston-super-Mare
	Report

Down Grange
Referee: R Steggall

22 February 2003

Havant	12 - 21	Blackheath
	Report

Hook's Lane
Referee: Steve Haarland

22 February 2003

Lydney	18 - 44	Rosslyn Park
	Report

Regentsholme
Referee: David Sainsbury

22 February 2003

Old Colfeians	19 - 19	Barking
	Report

Horn Park
Referee: Andrew Small

22 February 2003

Old Patesians	22 - 8	North Walsham
	Report

Everest Road
Referee: Nick Williams

22 February 2003

Redruth	16 - 14	Tabard
	Report

The Recreation Ground

22 February 2003

Westcombe Park	32 - 8	Camberley
	Report

Goddington Dene

=== Round 23 ===
1 March 2003

Barking	22 - 22	Redruth
	Report

Goresbrook
Referee: Richard Draper

1 March 2003

Blackheath	18 - 17	Basingstoke
	Report

Rectory Field

1 March 2003

Camberley	20 - 30	Old Colfeians
	Report

Watchetts Recreation Ground
Referee: Stuart Clotworth

1 March 2003

North Walsham	35 - 15	Westcombe Park
	Report

Norwich Road
Referee: Rob Sawyer

1 March 2003

Rosslyn Park	33 - 11	Havant
	Report

The Rock
Referee: Richard Phillips

1 March 2003

Tabard	29 - 30	Lydney
	Report

Cobden Hill
Referee: Andrew Smith

1 March 2003

Weston-super-Mare	13 - 9	Old Patesians
	Report

Recreation Ground
Referee: Andrew Bickle

=== Rounds 11, 16, 17 & 20 (rescheduled games) ===
8 March 2003

Basingstoke	35 - 13	North Walsham
	Report

Down Grange
Referee: Steve Harland

- Game rescheduled from 1 February 2003.

8 March 2003

Lydney	22 - 17	Havant
	Report

Regentsholme
Referee: Dan Berry

- Game rescheduled from 11 January 2003.

8 March 2003

Old Colfeians	17 - 10	Weston-super-Mare
	Report

Horn Park
Referee: Nick Cousins

- Game rescheduled from 4 January 2003.

8 March 2003

Rosslyn Park	55 - 12	Camberley
	Report

The Rock
Referee: Paul Dickens

- Game rescheduled from 23 November 2002.

=== Round 24 ===
15 March 2003

Barking	21 - 20	Tabard
	Report

Goresbrook
Referee: G O'Hara

15 March 2003

Basingstoke	25 - 36	Rosslyn Park
	Report

Down Grange
Referee: Steve Brown

15 March 2003

Havant	16 - 17	Lydney
	Report

Hook's Lane
Referee: R Steggall

15 March 2003

Old Colfeians	21 - 45	North Walsham
	Report

Horn Park
Referee: Revis Phillips

15 March 2003

Old Patesians	36 - 32	Blackheath
	Report

Everest Road
Referee: Richard Draper

15 March 2003

Redruth	55 - 10	Camberley
	Report

The Recreation Ground
Referee: Andrew Bickle

15 March 2003

Westcombe Park	23 - 35	Weston-super-Mare
	Report

Goddington Dene
Attendance: 250
Referee: Greg Garner

=== Rounds 10, 17 & 20 (rescheduled games) ===
22 March 2003

Camberley	8 - 45	Lydney
	Report

Watchetts Recreation Ground
Referee: Steve Harland

- Game rescheduled from 16 November 2002.

22 March 2003

North Walsham	34 - 17	Old Colfeians
	Report

Norwich Road
Attendance: 300
Referee: Greg Garner

- Game rescheduled from 11 January 2003.

22 March 2003

Rosslyn Park	58 - 10	Tabard
	Report

The Rock
Referee: Andrew Pearce

- Game rescheduled from 1 February 2003.

22 March 2003

Weston-super-Mare	20 - 10	Westcombe Park
	Report

Recreation Ground
Referee: Mark Rose

- Game rescheduled from 11 January 2003.

=== Round 25 ===
29 March 2003

Blackheath	36 - 16	Westcombe Park
	Report

Rectory Field
Referee: Andrew Small

29 March 2003

Camberley	20 - 35	Barking
	Report

Watchetts Recreation Ground
Referee: Fred Copstake

29 March 2003

Lydney	46 - 29	Basingstoke
	Report

Regentsholme
Referee: Andrew Bickle

29 March 2003

North Walsham	19 - 27	Redruth
	Report

Norwich Road
Referee: Stuart Clotworth

29 March 2003

Old Patesians	39 - 18	Rosslyn Park
	Report

Everest Road
Referee: Gareth Copsey

29 March 2003

Tabard	19 - 42	Havant
	Report

Cobden Hill
Referee: Terry Hall

29 March 2003

Weston-super-Mare	19 - 10	Old Colfeians
	Report

Recreation Ground
Referee: G O'Hara

=== Round 20 (rescheduled game) ===
5 April 2003

Havant	67 - 7	Weston-super-Mare
	Report

Hook's Lane
Referee: Gareth Copsey

- Game rescheduled from 1 February 2003.

=== Round 26 ===
12 April 2003

Barking	41 - 13	North Walsham
	Report

Goresbrook
Referee: Richard Draper

12 April 2003

Basingstoke	15 - 51	Havant
	Report

Down Grange
Referee: D May

12 April 2003

Camberley	16 - 42	Tabard
	Report

Watchetts Recreation Ground
Referee: Richard Phillips

12 April 2003

Old Colfeians	28 - 27	Blackheath
	Report

Horn Park
Referee: Steve Harland

12 April 2003

Old Patesians	25 - 28	Lydney
	Report

Everest Road

12 April 2003

Redruth	43 - 8	Weston-super-Mare
	Report

The Recreation Ground
Referee: Terry Hall

12 April 2003

Westcombe Park	23 - 45	Rosslyn Park
	Report

Goddington Dene
Referee: G O'Hara

=== Promotion play-off ===
The league runners up of National Division Three South and North would meet in a playoff game for promotion to National Division Two. Lydney were runners-up in the south and because they had a better league record than north runners-up, New Brighton, they hosted the play-off match.

26 April 2003

Lydney	21 - 7	New Brighton
	Report

Regentsholme
Referee: Nigel Higginson

== Total season attendances ==
Club	Home Games	Total	Average	Highest	Lowest	% Capacity
Barking	3	750	250	300	200	25%
Basingstoke	3	700	233	250	200	9%
Blackheath	1	300	300	300	300	9%
Camberley	2	450	225	250	200	
Havant	2	600	300	300	300	15%
Lydney	0	0	0	0	0	0%
North Walsham	3	1,150	383	500	300	32%
Old Colfeians	2	500	250	300	200	
Old Patesians	2	700	350	400	300	
Redruth	5	2,850	570	650	500	16%
Rosslyn Park	2	800	400	400	400	20%
Tabard	3	630	210	250	180	
Westcombe Park	5	1,550	310	400	250	10%
Weston-super-Mare	3	700	233	250	200	8%

== Individual statistics ==
- Note that points scorers includes tries as well as conversions, penalties and drop goals.

=== Top points scorers ===
Rank	Player	Team	Appearances	Points
1	(England) Adam Westall	Lydney	26	373
2	(England) Sam Howard	Rosslyn Park	22	359
3	(England) Derek Coates	Westcombe Park	26	267
4	(England) Ian Calder	Basingstoke	25	245
5	(Ireland) Jonathan Griffin	Blackheath	19	204
6	(England) Sid Claffey	Havant	23	175
7	(England) Justin Azzopardi	Barking	20	172
8	(England) Len Wilmot	North Walsham	23	167
9	(England) Scott Pollock	Old Patesians	17	152
10	(England) Micky Skinner	Tabard	17	145

=== Top try scorers ===
Rank	Player	Team	Appearances	Tries
1	(England) Andy Thorpe	North Walsham	21	21
2	(England) Ben Thomas	Westcombe Park / Rosslyn Park	15	15
2	(England) Charles Abban	Blackheath	18	15
2	(England) James Justice	Rosslyn Park	18	15
3	(England) Sam Howard	Rosslyn Park	22	14
3	(England) Brendan Higgins	Tabard	24	14
3	(England) Adam Westall	Lydney	26	14
4	(England) Christopher Norton	Basingstoke	21	13
4	(England) Anton Petzer	Havant	23	13
5	(England) Richard Jackson	Rosslyn Park	25	12

== Season records ==
=== Team ===
Largest home win — 72 pts

77 - 5 Rosslyn Park at home to Basingstoke on 11 January 2003

Largest away win — 57 pts

67 - 10 Rosslyn Park away to Old Colfeians on 14 December 2002

Most points scored — 82 pts

82 - 17 Rosslyn Park at home to Westcombe Park on 21 December 2002

Most tries in a match — 14

Rosslyn Park at home to Basingstoke on 11 January 2003

Most conversions in a match — 8 (x3)

Rosslyn Park away to Old Colfeians on 14 December 2002
Rosslyn Park at home to Westcombe Park on 21 December 2002
Havant v Weston-super-Mare on 5 April 2003

Most penalties in a match — 7

Blackheath at home to Redruth on 14 December 2002

Most drop goals in a match — 2

Lydney away to North Walsham on 28 December 2012

=== Player ===
Most points in a match — 32

(England) Sam Howard for Rosslyn Park away to Old Colfeians on 14 December 2002

Most tries in a match — 4 (x3)

(England) Scott Pollock for Old Patesians at home to Camberley on 1 February 2003
(England) Christopher for Basingstoke at home to North Walsham on 8 March 2003
(England) Nick Marval for Rosslyn Park at home to Tabard on 22 March 2003

Most conversions in a match — 8 (x3)

(England) Sam Howard for Rosslyn Park away to Old Colfeians on 14 December 2002
(England) Sam Howard for Rosslyn Park at home to Westcombe Park on 21 December 2002
(Ireland) Owen Cobbe for Havant v Weston-super-Mare on 5 April 2003

Most penalties in a match — 7

(Ireland) Jonathan Griffin for Blackheath at home to Redruth on 14 December 2002

Most drop goals in a match — 1

N/A - multiple players

=== Attendances ===
Highest — 650

Redruth at home to Rosslyn Park on 7 September 2002

Lowest — 180

Tabard at home to Blackheath on 9 November 2002

Highest Average Attendance — 570

Redruth

Lowest Average Attendance — 180

Tabard

Extremely poor attendance tracking meant it was impossible to get an accurate figure for attendances during this season. The figures above are simply the ones documented and larger/smaller attendances than those mentioned are very likely.

== See also ==
- English rugby union system
- Rugby union in England
