= Nuneaton Rugby Club =

English rugby union club

Nuneaton
- Full name: Nuneaton Rugby Football Club
- Union: Warwickshire RFU
- Nickname: Nuns
- Founded: 1879; 147 years ago
- Location: Nuneaton, Warwickshire
- Ground: Liberty Way (Capacity: 3,800 (500 seats))
- Chairman: Steve Bird
- President: Keith Howells
- Director of Rugby: Phil Llewellyn
- Coach: Huw Thomas
- Captain(s): (England) Louis Addleton (1st XV Captain), (England) Lucas Brindley (Club Captain)
- League: Regional 2 East Midlands
Team kit

Official website
- www.nuneatonrugby.co.uk

Nuneaton Rugby Club (Nuneaton R.F.C.) is an English rugby union club. They were founded in 1879 and play at Liberty Way in Nuneaton. They currently play in the Regional 2 East Midlands, a sixth tier league in the English rugby union system.

== History ==
Nuneaton Rugby Club was founded on 5 November 1879 in the town's Newdegate Arms Hotel, with the first recorded game versus Tamworth on 7 February 1880. A 2nd XV was formed in 1893 following amalgamation with the local side St. Mary's. The shirts were originally black with a red sash, which subsequently changed to the traditional red, white and black hooped shirts in 1911. By the outbreak of World War I, the Nuns had established a creditable reputation within rugby circles as a result of their performances. Fixtures included the likes of Leicester, Rugby, Northampton, Bedworth and Allesley. However, the war left them without a ground. The Nuns embarked on a ground sharing scheme with the town's cricket club in 1919 which only lasted a year. Many improvements were made to the ground making it one of the best in the area and in 1930 the club purchased the freehold from the brewery owners. The ground was known as the Harry Cleaver Ground, in recognition of one of the Club's stalwarts and remained its home until the last game which was played on 30 November 1995. The current Liberty Way site, which comprises 50 acres (200,000 m^{2}) compared to the previous five acres, was acquired and the first match was played on 9 December 1995. The Club's most successful period was from 1947 to 1954 especially the 1949–50 season, which saw ground attendance records shattered when the scalps of Coventry, London Irish and Saracens were taken, followed by an historic eight-day period when Leicester, Northampton and Coventry were all beaten. The Club was one of the first to recognise the demise of schools rugby and in the early 1970s embarked on a program to introduce Mini and Junior rugby. This early initiative has been well rewarded with the Mini & Junior's growing from strength to strength with numerous players going on to represent the 1st XV, Premiership and International sides. The professional era of the 1980s saw many changes within the structure of rugby football in general, with payment for players its most dominant feature, but this provided little advantage to Nuneaton. The current league system was established in 1987 with the Nuns being placed in Division Three North, where its fortunes waxed and waned until April 2003, when promotion to National League Two was achieved.

Life in National Division Two lasted only two seasons. The 2003–04 season saw the Nuns lose five of their first eight league games. However, they suffered only three more reversals in their remaining matches and ultimately finished third, narrowly missing out on promotion. Nuns then came back down to earth when they were relegated back into National Division Three North at the end of the 2004–05 season. Early season form was very much to blame picking up only one win and a draw from 13 fixtures, leaving them firmly rooted at the bottom of the league at the turn of the year. Things did start going Nuns way in the second half of the season finishing third bottom, but still one point from safety. The Club retained many of its players for the 2005–06 season and recruited well, which was reflected in the season's results, when the team remained unbeaten in the league until mid February. Four losses in the remaining part of the season, two to the eventual league winners Bradford & Bingley, saw the Nuns finish as runners up. Promotion back to National Division Two was achieved following a 15–6 play off victory over North Walsham in mid May. However The Nuns only lasted two seasons in National Two again. The 2006–07 season saw the Nuns appoint Paul Westgate as Director of Rugby and they managed to stay in the league after finishing in 11th place. At the end of the season Paul Westgate resigned and was replaced by former Samoa international and Rotherham coach Mike Umaga, Umaga struggled to keep a side he had inherited up and Nuneaton were relegated to National Three North.

The 2008–09 season saw Nuneaton run away with the National Three North title and promotion to the newly formed National One. The season was very successful with a young squad, who all had drive, ambition and a great team spirit. Mike Umaga was also named Midlands Coach of the Year. However, the Nun's stay at the third tier was again short-lived, seeing them relegated back to National League Two North. Unfortunately, two seasons later saw Nuneaton suffer relegation again, from the National Leagues into the Rugby Football Union Midland Division, where (in 2015), the club remain in National League 3 Midlands.

== Summary of league positions ==
After the use of Merit tables for the prior 3 seasons, in 1987 the RFU implemented a National League system. Nuneaton were initially placed in Courage National League Division 3 (now known as SSE National League 1). Below is an incomplete list summarizing Nuneaton's final league positions:

- 2000–01: National League 3 (North) (level 4) - 5th
- 2001–02: National League 3 (North) - 8th
- 2002–03: National League 3 (North) - 1st (champions)
- 2003–04: National League 2 (level 3) - 3rd
- 2004–05: National League 2 - 12th (relegated)
- 2005–06: National League 3 (North) - 2nd (promoted)
- 2006–07: National League 2 - 10th
- 2007–08: National League 2 - 12th (relegated)
- 2008–09: National League 3 (North) - 1st (champions)
- 2009–10: National League 1 (level 3)- 15th (relegated)
- 2010–11: National League 2 (North) (level 4) - 11th
- 2011–12: National League 2 (North) - 15th (relegated)
- 2012–13: National League 3 (Midlands) (level 5) - 4th
- 2013–14: National League 3 (Midlands) - 3rd
- 2014–15: National League 3 (Midlands) - 4th
- 2015–16: National League 3 (Midlands) - 5th
- 2016–17: National League 3 (Midlands) - 3rd
- 2017–18: Midlands Premier (Level 5) - 9th
- 2018–19: Midlands Premier (Level 5) - 7th
- 2019–20: Midlands Premier (Level 5) - 8th (Covid affected)
- 2020–21: Midlands Premier (Level 5) - Covid Cancelled Season
- 2021–22: Midlands Premier (Level 5) - 11th
- 2022–23: Regional 1 Midlands (Level 5) - 12th (relegated)
- 2023–24: Regional 2 Midlands East (Level 6) - 1st (promoted)
- 2024–25: Regional 1 Midlands (Level 5) - 6th
- 2025–26: Regional 1 Midlands (Level 5) - 12th
- 2026–27: Regional 2 East Midlands (Level 6)

== Honours ==
- National Division 3 North Champions (2 times): 2002-03, 2008–09
- National Division 3 North (north v south) Promotion play-off winners: 2005-06
- Regional 2 East Midlands Champions: 2023-2024
- Midland Counties Cup Winner (2): 1921-22, 1923–24
- Warwickshire Cup Winners (4): 2016-2017, 2021-2022, 2023-2024, 2024-2025

== Liberty Way Ground ==
The Nuns moved to Liberty Way in 1995, after purchasing 50 acres (200,000 m^{2}) from Warwickshire County Council. It contains several full-size pitches. There are four large changing rooms, with showers, a referee's room and a physiotherapist room. There is also a large function room with a large bar.

In 2006 Nuneaton RFC sold around 5 acres (20,000 m^{2}) of land effectively to Nuneaton Borough AFC, but technically to a new holding company, Stadiasafe (owned by Ted Stocker, who was involved with both clubs). The football club and rugby club originally had a ground share agreement for the sharing of the new football stadium, and the 2007–08 saw the two clubs share without any major problems. However, in the summer of 2008, the liquidation of Nuneaton Borough AFC caused serious problems. The newly formed Nuneaton Town FC, having gained ownership of the ground, did not honour the groundshare agreement (which it believed passed with the previous company). Under the old agreement, the rugby club paid £35 to hire the pitch, a fee that also covered the use of the flood lights and markings. Since this was previously paid to a sister company (the aforementioned Stadiasafe), the amount paid was immaterial. However, when the football club gained sole ownership, this sparked disagreements over the amount to be paid to the football club by the rugby club to play its games in the stadium. As no agreement could be reached between the two clubs, this led to Nuneaton RFC using one of their other pitches at the Liberty Way site. The summer of 2015 saw an agreement being reached between the new owners of the football club and the Nun's.
