= Christopher Williams (rugby union) =

England international rugby union player

- Full name: Christopher Gareth Williams
- Born: 21 December 1950 (age 75) Pontypridd, Wales
- Height: 6 ft 1 in (185 cm)

Rugby union career
- Position: Fly-half
International career
Years	Team	Apps	(Points)
1976	England	1	(0)

Christopher Gareth Williams (born 21 December 1950) is an English former rugby union international.

Williams, born in Pontypridd, Wales, moved to England aged seven. His father was Pontypridd RFC rugby player Gareth Williams, a teacher by profession. He attended Magdalen College School, Oxford and Lydney Grammar School.

A fly-half, Williams played his early rugby for the Lydney and Headingley clubs, the latter while stationed in Catterick with the RAF. He joined Gloucester in 1975 and the following year gained his solitary England cap against France at Parc des Princes, replacing Alan Old for the final Five Nations fixture. France won the match, but he set up England's only try.

== See also ==
- List of England national rugby union players
