= Park Lane (stadium) =

Rugby stadium in Whitefield, England

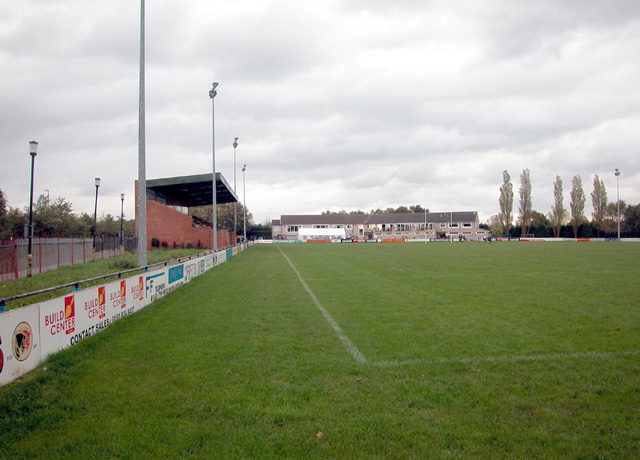
- Interactive map of Park Lane
- Full name: Park Lane
- Location: Park Lane, Whitefield, Greater Manchester, M45 7DZ
- Coordinates: 53°32′19″N 2°18′13″W
- Capacity: 3,000
- Surface: Grass

Construction
- Built: 1955
- Opened: 1955
- Renovated: 1982
- Expanded: 1990

Tenants
- Sedgley Park R.U.F.C. (1955 – present); Swinton R.L.F.C. (2003–10; 2014)

Park Lane is a rugby stadium in Whitefield near Bury, Greater Manchester, England. It is the home of Sedgley Park R.U.F.C. and, from 2003–10 and 2014, Swinton rugby league club.

== History ==
Sedgley Park R.U.F.C. moved to Park Lane in 1955. A large, two-storey clubhouse was completed in 1982 and was extended in the 1990s. Also in the 1990s the club turned its two pitches into one and purchased a field, just across the road, to provide three more much needed pitches.

=== Rugby league ===
Swinton Lions played their home fixtures at Park Lane between 2003 and 2010. Oldham also played several home matches at Park Lane during this period. Swinton's first match at Park Lane, in the third round of the 2003 Challenge Cup, saw Swinton defeat Shaw Cross 46–0 in front of a crowd of 315. Swinton's highest attendance at Park Lane came in the fifth round of the 2010 Challenge Cup, when 5,316 watched a 58–6 loss to Batley Bulldogs.

During the 2014 season, Swinton played several fixtures at Park Lane, though the majority of their matches were at Leigh Sports Village.
