= Halifax RUFC =

English rugby union club, based in Halifax, West Yorkshire

(England) Halifax RUFC
- Full name: Halifax Rugby Union Football Club
- Union: Yorkshire Rugby Football Union
- Founded: 1919; 107 years ago
- Location: Halifax, West Yorkshire, England
- Ground: Ovenden Park
- Chairman: Neil Walsh
- Director of Rugby: Jason Brian
- League(s): Men – Yorkshire, Women – National Challenge North One West
- 2024–25: Women – 3rd, Men 2nd (Promoted from YD3)
Team kit

Official website
- halifaxrufc.rfu.club

Halifax Rugby Union Football Club is an English rugby union team based in Halifax, West Yorkshire. The club currently runs two senior men's teams (1xv, which currently plays in Counties 2 Yorkshire, 2ndxv/Vets) along with 2 Women's rugby union teams (1xv & Development) and a Mixed Ability rugby team.

== History ==
Halifax was founded in 1919, after the First World War, when the British Expeditionary Force returned home victorious from France. Halifax RUFC holds the record for the most wins in the Yorkshire Challenge Cup, having carried off the ancient trophy thirteen times including three times in succession in 1926-7-8. International honours for England have been gained by Phil Horrocks-Taylor (nine caps – 1958/64), Harry Wilkinson (four caps – 1929/30) and Lt. Col. Charles Faithfull (three caps – 1924/26), whilst Mike Campbell-Lamerton (twenty three caps – 1961/66), gained great fame with Scotland touring Australia, New Zealand and South Africa with the British Lions whilst also receiving the supreme honour of Captain. Horrocks and Wilkie were also tourists to Australia and New Zealand. Prop Richard Szabo the first Hungarian International gaining two caps in 2004/2005.

With the arrival of League Rugby in 1987/88, Halifax gained promotion from North 2 to North 1 at the first attempt, before being relegated twice, back to North 2 in 1990/91 and to North East 1 in 1997/98. Then in three successive seasons, Halifax were crowned Champions of North East 1 in 1999/2000 and Champions of North 2 East in 2000/2001, and of North 1 in 2001/2002 reaching National League status. In addition to winning North 1, and to crown a successful season, Halifax won through to the Final of the Powergen Intermediate Cup at Twickenham where they triumphed over Gosport and Fareham (43–19). This was a considerable achievement, considering that 512 clubs from throughout England entered the competition. Halifax had to win nine rounds to win the trophy, which included a memorable 20–19 win over the famous Richmond Club in the Quarter Final.

After a substantial loss in funding, Halifax RUFC pulled out from the National League set-up and decided to start afresh in Yorkshire Six, the lowest possible league, in which they finished top with only one defeat in the last game away to Wetherby. The club was forced to officially use the name Halifax Vikings for the Yorkshire Six campaign. The club had wanted to return the traditional name of Halifax RUFC. However, as the Vikings were already registered as the team that would compete in Yorkshire Six before the senior side pulled out of the National League set-up, the Ovenden Park club had to keep the Vikings label for that season.

The club won the Yorkshire Six title, winning 11 out of 12 games – with Halifax promoted to Yorkshire Four as a result, with the old Yorkshire Six division merging with Yorkshire Five.

The Yorkshire RFU and Northern Competitions Committee of the RFU have accepted the return to Halifax RUFC for the 2010/11 campaign.

In the season 2014/2015 Halifax Rufc gained promotion from Yorkshire four to Yorkshire 3.

In 2015, the club were featured in an advert for Land Rover as part of their “WE DEAL IN REAL” campaign in aid of the 2015 Rugby World Cup.

== Men's rugby ==
Halifax currently run 2 senior men's teams consisting of a 1xv, 2nd xv/Vets.

-1xv- The 1xv currently compete in the Yorkshire Division Two league having gained promotion in 2024/25 season. The First team had an interesting season, starting a fresh with a new squad and new coach. The team had its ups and downs and produced some exceptional rugby at times. In 2025/26 season a new captain and vice captain were announced with the influence of Rugby League continuing in earnest as Willie Woodhead being named skipper for the first time.

-2nd xv- The 2nd xv also known as Halifax Dukes, compete in YRFU Western Merit League. The second/Dukes team has had a squad composed of a mixture of veterans and new blood that have proved they can be a force to be reckoned with.

-Vets- The vets team is made up of players 35 and over and is played on a casual basis a couple of times a season.

== Women's rugby ==
The Halifax Ladies was set up in 1996 by former chairman Grayham Smith and it has grown from strength to strength. They have made a number of on screen appearances on shows such as BT Sport rugby tonight as well as a 15-minute episode of Rugby Nats.

1XV

The Halifax Ladies currently compete in the Women's Championship North Two. They are the highest playing women's team within Calderdale or Kirklees

Halifax Ravens

The Halifax Ladies run a development team where newer players can have an opportunity to get game time against other teams and build their skills in a safe environment.

== Mixed ability rugby ==
The mixed ability are currently being managed and coached by Craig Smith & several other coaches. They aim to make rugby accessible to everyone regardless of ability or disability.

== Club honours ==
- Yorkshire Cup winners (13): 1926, 1927, 1928, 1930, 1933, 1935, 1950, 1951, 1964, 1967, 1971, 2004, 2005
- North East 1 champions: 1999–00
- North Division 2 East champions: 2000–01
- North Division 1 champions: 2001–02
- RFU Intermediate Cup winners: 2002
- National Division 3 North champions: 2004–05
- Yorkshire 6 champions: 2009–10
- Yorkshire 4 Champions: 2014–15
- Women's National Challenge North 1 Champions 2024-2025
