= Lydney RFC =

English rugby union club, based in Gloucestershire

(England) Lydney
- Full name: Lydney Rugby Football Club
- Union: Gloucestershire RFU
- Founded: 1888; 138 years ago
- Location: Lydney, Gloucestershire, England
- Ground: Regentsholme (Capacity: 3,000 (340 seats))
- Coach: Sam Arnott
- Captain: Ben Large
- League: Regional 1 South West
- 2025–26: 7th
1st kit	2nd kit

Official website
- www.lydneyrfc.com

Lydney Rugby Football Club is a rugby union club based in Lydney, Gloucestershire. The club currently play in Regional 1 South West at the fifth tier of the English rugby union system following their promotion after the 2021–22 season.

== History ==
The Lydney and Aylburton Rugby Football Club was formed at a meeting was organized by Mr F A Fream on Thursday 11 October 1888, after members of the Lydney and Aylburton Cricket Club had expressed an interest in playing a "winter" game, which was already played by a number of clubs in the area. The first game was played at Lydney on 22 November 1888 against Coleford who won by 3 tries and 1 conversion to nil. The club was originally nicknamed "the Tinplaters", but later were more widely known as the Severnsiders.

== Results ==
The club enjoyed several successful runs in the John Player Cup during the 1980s, including a match against Sale, then the top club side in England, on 23 January 1983. The match was televised on the BBC's Rugby Special, with Lydney narrowly losing 9 – 16.

== Honours ==
- Courage Area League South champions: 1988–89
- Courage League Division 5 South champions: 1995–96
- National Division Three (north v south) promotion play-off winners: 2002–03
- National League 3 South West champions: 2013–14

== Club officials ==
Upon its founding, Charles Bathurst, 1st Viscount Bledisloe, later Governor-General of New Zealand, was invited to become President of the club. He held this position for 70 years until his death in 1958.

== Players and coaches ==
From the early days Lydney had produced a steady stream of players who achieved County honours. Austin Lewis also had English and Welsh trials in 1904/5 and 1905/6.

No player has achieved senior international honours while playing for the club. However, having begun their careers with Lydney, Bev Dovey, Trevor Wintle, Chris Williams, Peter Kingston and Gordon Sargent won full England caps while playing for other clubs. Robert Sargent represented England Colleges against Wales in 2001. England Women's International Georgia Stevens also played for Lydney.

Career records Most 1st XV appearances – 571 Winston Morris

Most 1st XV points scored – 1927 John F Morris

Most 1st XV tries scored – 160 Paul Howell

Single season records

Most 1st XV points scored – 418 Adam Westall (2002–03)

Most 1st XV tries scored – 33 David Crabbe (1972–73)

Most 1st XV drop goals – 12 Mark Smith (1989–90)

== Notable players ==
- Steve James (cricketer)
