= 2004–05 National Division Three North =

Rugby union competition in England

- Countries: England
- Champions: Halifax
- Runners-up: Macclesfield
- Relegated: Bedford Athletic, Dudley Kingswinford, Rugby Lions
- Attendance: 39,276 (average 269 per match) (Note: Note that 36 home attendances are missing (see below) - so the total attendance will not be 100% accurate. The average attendance has also been taken into account with the missing games not included.)
- Highest attendance: 700; Cleckheaton v Halifax; 22 January 2005; Bradford & Bingley v Halifax; 16 April 2005
- Lowest attendance: 70; Blaydon v Kendal; 4 December 2004
- Top point scorer: (England) Tom Rhodes (Bradford & Bingley); 275 points
- Top try scorer: (New Zealand) Anzac Luteru (Halifax); 21 tries

The 2004–05 National Division Three North was the fifth season (seventeenth overall) of the fourth division (north) of the English domestic rugby union competition using the name National Division Three North. New teams to the division included Rugby Lions who were relegated from the 2003–04 National Division Two while Bedford Athletic were promoted as champions of Midlands Division 1 along with Bradford & Bingley (champions) and Cleckheaton (playoffs) who both came up from North Division 1. The season would also see the introduction of a new points system with 4 points being awarded for a win, 2 points being awarded for a draw (replacing the old system of 2 points for a win and 1 for a draw) with the addition of a bonus point being given for scoring 4 or more tries as well as a bonus point given if you manage to lose a game within 7 points of the victorious team. In terms of promotion the league champions would go straight up into National Division Two while the runners up would have a one-game playoff against the runners up from National Division Three South (at the home ground of the club with the superior league record) for the final promotion place.

Halifax would finish as runaway champions of the league, ending up 14 points clear of nearest rivals Macclesfield (even with a cancelled game against Blaydon) and gaining promotion to the 2005–06 National Division Two. Runners up Macclesfield would fail to join Halifax as they lost their playoff game away to 2004–05 National Division Three South runners up Redruth in the north-south playoff in front of a huge crowd of 4,000 at the Recreation Ground. Although Halifax won the league with plenty to spare the rest of the division was fairly closely contested with only 3 wins separating 4th placed Fylde from 12th placed Rugby Lions. In terms of relegation newly promoted Bedford Athletic went down first followed by Dudley Kingswinford. The final spot was taken by Rugby Lions suffering their third successive relegation. Rugby Lions would actually have stayed up had in not been for a five-point penalty given for them fielding too many foreign players in a home game against Bedford Athletic. All three relegated teams would drop down to Midlands Division 1 for the following season. Although Rugby Lions were punished from fielding too many overseas players, other teams benefited immensely from their foreign contingent (particularly Halifax and Bradford & Bingley) with six of the top ten try scorers hailing from outside England.

== Participating teams and locations ==
Locations of the 2004-05 National Division Three North teams

Team	Stadium	Capacity	City/Area
Bedford Athletic	Putnoe Woods	500	Bedford, Bedfordshire
Blaydon	Crow Trees	2,000 (400 seats)	Swalwell, Tyne and Wear
Bradford & Bingley	Wagon Lane	4,000	Bingley, West Yorkshire
Cleckheaton	Cleckheaton Sports Club		Cleckheaton, West Yorkshire
Darlington	Blackwell Meadows	3,000	Darlington, County Durham
Darlington Mowden Park	Yiewsley Drive		Darlington, County Durham
Dudley Kingswinford	Heathbrook	2,260	Kingswinford, Dudley, West Midlands
Fylde	Woodlands Memorial Ground	7,500 (500 seats)	Lytham St. Annes, Lancashire
Halifax	Ovenden Park		Halifax, West Yorkshire
Kendal	Mint Bridge	4,600 (600 seats)	Kendal, Cumbria
Macclesfield	Priory Park	1,250 (250 seats)	Macclesfield, Cheshire
New Brighton	Hartsfield	2,000	Wirral, Merseyside
Rugby Lions	Webb Ellis Road	3,200 (200 seats)	Rugby, Warwickshire
Tynedale	Tynedale Park	2,000 (400 seats)	Corbridge, Northumberland

== Final league table ==
2004-05 National Division Three North table
Pos	Team	Pld	W	D	L	PF	PA	PD	TB	LB	Pts	Qualification
1	Halifax (Note: Halifax's game away to Blaydon would be cancelled due to fixture congestion.) (C)	25	23	1	1	878	399	+479	17	1	112	Promoted
2	Macclesfield	26	19	1	6	607	402	+205	8	2	88	Promotion play-off
3	Bradford & Bingley	26	17	1	8	680	451	+229	10	4	84	
4	Fylde	26	13	2	11	599	506	+93	7	2	65	
5	Tynedale	26	13	1	12	512	598	−86	5	4	63	
6	New Brighton	26	11	3	12	530	523	+7	6	6	62	
7	Darlington Mowden Park	26	12	1	13	505	531	−26	7	4	61	
8	Darlington	26	10	2	14	532	642	−110	5	6	55	
9	Kendal	26	10	1	15	506	584	−78	6	6	54	
10	Blaydon (Note: Blaydon's game at home to Halifax would be cancelled due to fixture congestion.)	25	11	0	14	439	508	−69	5	4	53	
11	Cleckheaton	26	10	0	16	458	646	−188	6	5	51	
12	Rugby Lions (R)	26	9	2	15	532	523	+9	6	8	49 (Note: Rugby Lions deducted 5 points for fielding too many overseas players against Bedford Athletic on 11 December 2004.)	Relegated
13	Dudley Kingswinford (R)	26	8	3	15	444	690	−246	1	5	44	Relegated
14	Bedford Athletic (R)	26	6	0	20	468	687	−219	3	3	30	Relegated

Updated to match(es) played on 30-04-2005. Source: Rugby Statbunker
(C) Champion; (R) Relegated

== Results ==
=== Round 1 ===
4 September 2004

(BP) Bedford Athletic	34 - 10	Blaydon
	Report

Putnoe Woods
Referee: Matthew Daubney

4 September 2004

(BP) Bradford & Bingley	28 - 45	Tynedale (BP)
	Report

Wagon Lane
Referee: Mick Reid

4 September 2004

(BP) Darlington Mowden Park	13 - 16	Cleckheaton
	Report

Yiewsley Drive
Referee: Alan Hughes

4 September 2004

Fylde	20 - 5	Macclesfield
	Report

Woodlands Memorial Ground
Referee: Ged Stone

4 September 2004

(BP) Kendal	10 - 17	Halifax

Mint Bridge
Referee: Trevor Fisher

4 September 2004

(BP) New Brighton	29 - 12	Dudley Kingswinford
	Report

Hartsfield
Referee: D Edmunds

4 September 2004

(BP) Rugby Lions	28 - 16	Darlington
	Report

Webb Ellis Road
Referee: Ian Robinson

=== Round 2 ===
11 September 2004

Bradford & Bingley	30 - 17	Bedford Athletic
	Report

Wagon Lane
Referee: Ian Robinson

11 September 2004

Cleckheaton	19 - 17	Fylde (BP)
	Report

Cleckheaton Sports Club
Referee: Brendan Fitzmaurice

11 September 2004

Darlington	7 - 33	Blaydon (BP)
	Report

Blackwell Meadows
Referee: Andrew Gardner

11 September 2004

Dudley Kingswinford	3 - 36	Rugby Lions (BP)
	Report

Heathbrook
Referee: Richard Parker-Sedgmore

11 September 2004

Halifax	32 - 24	New Brighton
	Report

Ovenden Park
Referee: Tim Miller

11 September 2004

(BP) Macclesfield	37 - 6	Kendal
	Report

Priory Park
Referee: David Drury

11 September 2004

(BP) Tynedale	30 - 18	Darlington Mowden Park
	Report

Tynedale Park
Referee: Andrew Vertigan

=== Round 3 ===
25 September 2004

(BP) Bedford Athletic	16 - 17	Darlington
	Report

Putnoe Woods
Referee: G O'Hara

25 September 2004

Blaydon	27 - 10	Dudley Kingswinford
	Report

Crow Trees
Referee: Brendan Fitzmaurice

25 September 2004

Darlington Mowden Park	31 - 27	Bradford & Bingley (BP)
	Report

Yiewsley Drive
Referee: Andrew Gardner

25 September 2004

Kendal	30 - 27	Cleckheaton (BP)
	Report

Mint Bridge
Attendance: 240
Referee: Mick Reid

25 September 2004

(BP) New Brighton	13 - 18	Macclesfield
	Report

Hartsfield
Referee: Alistair Van Wyk

25 September 2004

Rugby Lions	13 - 21	Halifax
	Report

Webb Ellis Road
Referee: Alan Hughes

25 September 2004

Fylde	P - P	Tynedale

- Postponed. Game rescheduled to 12 February 2005.

=== Round 4 ===
9 October 2004

Bradford & Bingley	10 - 31	Fylde
	Report

Wagon Lane
Referee: Ged Stone

9 October 2004

(BP) Cleckheaton	24 - 42	New Brighton (BP)
	Report

Cleckheaton Sports Club
Attendance: 200
Referee: Mark Wilson

9 October 2004

(BP) Darlington Mowden Park	35 - 20	Bedford Athletic
	Report

Yiewsley Drive
Attendance: 191
Referee: Mick Reid

9 October 2004

Dudley Kingswinford	25 - 25	Darlington
	Report

Heathbrook
Attendance: 200
Referee: Eric Woodmason

9 October 2004

(BP) Halifax	40 - 12	Blaydon
	Report

Ovenden Park
Referee: David Drury

9 October 2004

(BP) Macclesfield	30 - 22	Rugby Lions
	Report

Priory Park
Attendance: 294
Referee: Paul Dickens

9 October 2004

(BP) Tynedale	45 - 27	Kendal (BP)
	Report

Tynedale Park
Attendance: 294
Referee: Alan Hughes

=== Round 5 ===
23 October 2004

Bedford Athletic	10 - 23	Dudley Kingswinford
	Report

Putnoe Woods
Attendance: 200
Referee: Rhys Davies

23 October 2004

(BP) Blaydon	13 - 18	Macclesfield
	Report

Crow Trees
Attendance: 120
Referee: Des Headington

23 October 2004

(BP) Darlington	23 - 30	Halifax (BP)
	Report

Blackwell Meadows
Attendance: 200
Referee: Alan Hughes

23 October 2004

Fylde	15 - 3	Darlington Mowden Park
	Report

Woodlands Memorial Ground
Attendance: 400
Referee: Ian Robinson

23 October 2004

Kendal	22 - 14	Bradford & Bingley
	Report

Mint Bridge
Referee: David Drury

23 October 2004

New Brighton	28 - 7	Tynedale
	Report

Hartsfield
Attendance: 250
Referee: Matthew Daubney

23 October 2004

(BP) Rugby Lions	37 - 6	Cleckheaton
	Report

Webb Ellis Road
Attendance: 340
Referee: Mark Varnon

=== Round 6 ===
30 October 2004

Bradford & Bingley	12 - 10	New Brighton (BP)
	Report

Wagon Lane
Referee: Mick Reid

30 October 2004

Cleckheaton	23 - 3	Blaydon
	Report

Cleckheaton Sports Club
Attendance: 350
Referee: Ian Robinson

30 October 2004

Darlington Mowden Park	29 - 20	Kendal
	Report

Yiewsley Drive
Attendance: 202
Referee: Andrew Vertigan

30 October 2004

Fylde	18 - 8	Bedford Athletic
	Report

Woodlands Memorial Ground
Attendance: 255
Referee: Andrew Gardner

30 October 2004

(BP) Halifax	44 - 17	Dudley Kingswinford
	Report

Ovenden Park
Referee: Ged Stone

30 October 2004

Macclesfield	18 - 13	Darlington (BP)
	Report

Priory Park
Attendance: 307
Referee: D Edmunds

30 October 2004

Tynedale	23 - 23	Rugby Lions
	Report

Tynedale Park
Attendance: 200
Referee: David Drury

=== Round 7 ===
6 November 2004

(BP) Blaydon	17 - 21	Tynedale
	Report

Crow Trees
Attendance: 350
Referee: Brendan Fitzmaurice

6 November 2004

(BP) Darlington	40 - 12	Cleckheaton
	Report

Blackwell Meadows
Attendance: 200
Referee: Trevor Fisher

6 November 2004

(BP) Dudley Kingswinford	13 - 18	Macclesfield
	Report

Heathbrook
Referee: David Grashoff

6 November 2004

(BP) New Brighton	10 - 13	Darlington Mowden Park
	Report

Hartsfield
Attendance: 200
Referee: Ged Stone

6 November 2004

(BP) Rugby Lions	8 - 9	Bradford & Bingley
	Report

Webb Ellis Road
Attendance: 320
Referee: Greg Garner

6 November 2004

Bedford Athletic	P - P	Halifax

- Postponed. Game rescheduled to 12 February 2005.

6 November 2004

Kendal	P - P	Fylde

- Postponed. Game rescheduled to 26 March 2005.

=== Round 8 ===
13 November 2004

(BP) Bradford & Bingley	42 - 5	Blaydon
	Report

Wagon Lane
Attendance: 240
Referee: Guy Steel Bodger

13 November 2004

Cleckheaton	18 - 24	Dudley Kingswinford
	Report

Cleckheaton Sports Club
Attendance: 200
Referee: David Drury

13 November 2004

(BP) Darlington Mowden Park	28 - 21	Rugby Lions (BP)
	Report

Yiewsley Drive
Attendance: 143
Referee: Alan Hughes

13 November 2004

Fylde	20 - 19	New Brighton (BP)
	Report

Woodlands Memorial Ground
Attendance: 390
Referee: Andrew Vertigan

13 November 2004

Kendal	29 - 20	Bedford Athletic
	Report

Mint Bridge
Referee: D Edmunds

13 November 2004

Macclesfield	11 - 20	Halifax
	Report

Priory Park
Attendance: 397
Referee: Andrew Gardner

13 November 2004

Tynedale	30 - 27	Darlington (BP)
	Report

Tynedale Park
Attendance: 200
Referee: Ged Stone

=== Round 9 ===
20 November 2004

Bedford Athletic	15 - 33	Macclesfield (BP)
	Report

Putnoe Woods
Attendance: 100
Referee: Rhys Davies

20 November 2004

Darlington	15 - 33	Bradford & Bingley (BP)
	Report

Blackwell Meadows
Attendance: 200
Referee: Chris Seeley

20 November 2004

(BP) Dudley Kingswinford	15 - 18	Tynedale
	Report

Heathbrook
Attendance: 200
Referee: Richard Parker-Sedgmore

20 November 2004

New Brighton	21 - 18	Kendal (BP)
	Report

Hartsfield
Attendance: 150

20 November 2004

(BP) Rugby Lions	17 - 24	Fylde
	Report

Webb Ellis Road
Attendance: 180
Referee: Brendan Fitzmaurice

20 November 2004

Blaydon	P - P	Darlington Mowden Park

- Postponed. Game rescheduled to 12 February 2005.

20 November 2004

Halifax	P - P	Cleckheaton

- Postponed. Game rescheduled to 26 March 2005.

=== Round 10 ===
27 November 2004

(BP) Bradford & Bingley	77 - 7	Dudley Kingswinford
	Report

Wagon Lane
Attendance: 215
Referee: Andrew Gardner

27 November 2004

Cleckheaton	6 - 31	Macclesfield (BP)
	Report

Cleckheaton Sports Club
Attendance: 250
Referee: Brendan Fitzmaurice

27 November 2004

Darlington Mowden Park	30 - 23	Darlington (BP)
	Report

Yiewsley Drive
Attendance: 512
Referee: Andrew Vertigan

27 November 2004

(BP) Fylde	32 - 3	Blaydon
	Report

Woodlands Memorial Ground
Attendance: 200
Referee: Ged Stone

27 November 2004

Kendal	7 - 17	Rugby Lions
	Report

Mint Bridge
Attendance: 250
Referee: Matthew Daubney

27 November 2004

(BP) New Brighton	33 - 8	Bedford Athletic
	Report

Hartsfield
Attendance: 350
Referee: David Drury

27 November 2004

Tynedale	20 - 34	Halifax (BP)
	Report

Tynedale Park
Referee: Ian Robinson

=== Round 11 ===
4 December 2004

Bedford Athletic	31 - 18	Cleckheaton
	Report

Putnoe Woods
Attendance: 250
Referee: Terry Hall

4 December 2004

(BP) Blaydon	28 - 25	Kendal (2BP)
	Report

Crow Trees
Attendance: 70
Referee: Alan Hughes

4 December 2004

(BP) Darlington	30 - 22	Fylde
	Report

Blackwell Meadows
Attendance: 200
Referee: D Edmunds

4 December 2004

Dudley Kingswinford	17 - 17	Darlington Mowden Park
	Report

Heathbrook
Attendance: 250
Referee: Des Headington

4 December 2004

(BP) Halifax	32 - 26	Bradford & Bingley (BP)
	Report

Ovenden Park
Attendance: 600
Referee: Mick Reid

4 December 2004

Macclesfield	22 - 20	Tynedale (BP)
	Report

Priory Park
Attendance: 283
Referee: Matthew Daubney

4 December 2004

(BP) Rugby Lions	21 - 27	New Brighton
	Report

Webb Ellis Road
Attendance: 150
Referee: Ed Turnill

=== Round 12 ===
11 December 2004

Bradford & Bingley	19 - 14	Macclesfield (BP)
	Report

Wagon Lane
Attendance: 265
Referee: Ian Robinson

11 December 2004

Darlington Mowden Park	15 - 30	Halifax (BP)
	Report

Yiewsley Drive
Attendance: 267
Referee: Brendan Fitzmaurice

11 December 2004

(BP) Fylde	52 - 22	Dudley Kingswinford
	Report

Woodlands Memorial Ground
Referee: Alan Hughes

11 December 2004

(BP) Kendal	39 - 7	Darlington
	Report

Mint Bridge
Attendance: 250
Referee: David Sainsbury

11 December 2004

New Brighton	8 - 20	Blaydon
	Report

Hartsfield
Attendance: 300

11 December 2004

(BP) Rugby Lions	37 - 13	Bedford Athletic
	Report

Webb Ellis Road
Attendance: 300
Referee: Ged Stone

11 December 2004

Tynedale	18 - 17	Cleckheaton (BP)
	Report

Tynedale Park
Attendance: 180
Referee: Andrew Gardner

=== Round 13 ===
18 December 2004

(BP) Bedford Athletic	23 - 24	Tynedale (BP)
	Report

Putnoe Woods
Attendance: 100
Referee: Paul Dickens

18 December 2004

Blaydon	29 - 22	Rugby Lions (BP)
	Report

Crow Trees
Attendance: 180
Referee: Mick Reid

18 December 2004

Cleckheaton	10 - 23	Bradford & Bingley
	Report

Cleckheaton Sports Club
Attendance: 600
Referee: Matthew Daubney

18 December 2004

(BP) Darlington	16 - 23	New Brighton
	Report

Blackwell Meadows
Attendance: 150
Referee: Ged Stone

18 December 2004

(BP) Dudley Kingswinford	20 - 27	Kendal (BP)
	Report

Heathbrook
Attendance: 250
Referee: Chris Seeley

18 December 2004

(BP) Halifax	39 - 12	Fylde
	Report

Ovenden Park
Attendance: 500
Referee: David Drury

18 December 2004

(BP) Macclesfield	32 - 0	Darlington Mowden Park
	Report

Priory Park
Attendance: 387
Referee: Des Headington

=== Round 14 ===
8 January 2005

Cleckheaton	21 - 6	Bedford Athletic
	Report

Cleckheaton Sports Club
Attendance: 250
Referee: Andrew Gardner

8 January 2005

(BP) Darlington Mowden Park	0 - 5	Dudley Kingswinford
	Report

Yiewsley Drive
Referee: Chris Seeley

8 January 2005

(BP) New Brighton	15 - 22	Rugby Lions
	Report

Hartsfield
Attendance: 220
Referee: David Drury

8 January 2005

Bradford & Bingley	P - P	Halifax

- Postponed. Game rescheduled to 16 April 2005.

8 January 2005

Fylde	P - P	Darlington

- Postponed. Game rescheduled to 16 April 2005.

8 January 2005

Kendal	P - P	Blaydon

- Postponed. Game rescheduled to 16 April 2005.

8 January 2005

Tynedale	P - P	Macclesfield

- Postponed. Game rescheduled to 26 March 2005.

=== Round 15 ===
15 January 2005

(BP) Bedford Athletic	39 - 14	New Brighton
	Report

Putnoe Woods

15 January 2005

Blaydon	25 - 15	Fylde
	Report

Crow Trees
Attendance: 170
Referee: Alan Hughes

15 January 2005

(BP) Darlington	28 - 22	Darlington Mowden Park (BP)
	Report

Blackwell Meadows
Attendance: 500
Referee: Brendan Fitzmaurice

15 January 2005

Dudley Kingswinford	23 - 20	Bradford & Bingley (BP)
	Report

Heathbrook
Attendance: 410
Referee: Ged Stone

15 January 2005

Halifax	20 - 7	Tynedale
	Report

Ovenden Park
Attendance: 400
Referee: Ian Robinson

15 January 2005

Macclesfield	13 - 9	Cleckheaton (BP)
	Report

Priory Park
Attendance: 249
Referee: Matthew Daubney

15 January 2005

Rugby Lions	8 - 23	Kendal
	Report

Webb Ellis Road
Attendance: 250
Referee: Steve Harland

=== Round 16 ===
22 January 2005

(BP) Bradford & Bingley	42 - 12	Darlington
	Report

Wagon Lane
Attendance: 235
Referee: David Drury

22 January 2005

Cleckheaton	7 - 35	Halifax (BP)
	Report

Cleckheaton Sports Club
Attendance: 700
Referee: Ed Turnill

22 January 2005

Darlington Mowden Park	5 - 21	Blaydon
	Report

Yiewsley Drive
Attendance: 142
Referee: Trevor Fisher

22 January 2005

(BP) Fylde	31 - 17	Rugby Lions
	Report

Woodlands Memorial Ground
Attendance: 290
Referee: Matthew Daubney

22 January 2005

Kendal	20 - 8	New Brighton
	Report

Mint Bridge
Referee: Guy Steel Bodger

22 January 2005

(BP) Macclesfield	33 - 19	Bedford Athletic
	Report

Priory Park
Attendance: 183
Referee: Mick Reid

22 January 2005

Tynedale	24 - 22	Dudley Kingswinford (BP)
	Report

Tynedale Park
Attendance: 175
Referee: Alan Hughes

=== Round 17 ===
29 January 2005

Bedford Athletic	10 - 0	Kendal
	Report

Putnoe Woods
Attendance: 250
Referee: Matthew Daubney

29 January 2005

Blaydon	3 - 12	Bradford & Bingley
	Report

Crow Trees
Attendance: 170
Referee: Ian Robinson

29 January 2005

(BP) Darlington	38 - 19	Tynedale
	Report

Blackwell Meadows
Attendance: 200
Referee: Rhys Davies

29 January 2005

(BP) Dudley Kingswinford	15 - 18	Cleckheaton
	Report

Heathbrook
Attendance: 450
Referee: Tim Miller

29 January 2005

Halifax	25 - 19	Macclesfield (BP)
	Report

Ovenden Park
Attendance: 600
Referee: Dale Newitt

29 January 2005

New Brighton	19 - 19	Fylde
	Report

Hartsfield
Attendance: 350
Referee: David Grashoff

29 January 2005

Rugby Lions	18 - 3	Darlington Mowden Park
	Report

Webb Ellis Road
Attendance: 290
Referee: Ed Turnill

=== Round 18 ===
5 February 2005

(BP) Bradford & Bingley	32 - 15	Rugby Lions
	Report

Wagon Lane
Attendance: 280
Referee: Andrew Vertigan

5 February 2005

Cleckheaton	17 - 15	Darlington (BP)
	Report

Cleckheaton Sports Club
Attendance: 350
Referee: Eric Woodmason

5 February 2005

Darlington Mowden Park	22 - 32	New Brighton (BP)
	Report

Yiewsley Drive
Attendance: 110
Referee: Alan Hughes

5 February 2005

Fylde	8 - 8	Kendal
	Report

Woodlands Memorial Ground
Attendance: 250
Referee: Brendan Fitzmaurice

5 February 2005

(BP) Halifax	34 - 14	Bedford Athletic
	Report

Ovenden Park
Attendance: 375
Referee: Richard Parker-Sedgmore

5 February 2005

(BP) Macclesfield	45 - 17	Dudley Kingswinford
	Report

Priory Park
Attendance: 238
Referee: Andrew Gardner

5 February 2005

Tynedale	15 - 26	Blaydon
	Report

Tynedale Park
Attendance: 220
Referee: D Edmunds

=== Rounds 3, 7 & 9 (rescheduled games) ===
12 February 2005

Bedford Athletic	23 - 45	Halifax (BP)
	Report

Putnoe Woods
Attendance: 200
Referee: Ged Stone

- Game rescheduled from 6 November 2004.

12 February 2005

Blaydon	13 - 34	Darlington Mowden Park (BP)
	Report

Crow Trees
Attendance: 210
Referee: David Drury

- Game rescheduled from 20 November 2004.

12 February 2005

(BP) Fylde	26 - 0	Tynedale
	Report

Woodlands Memorial Ground
Attendance: 150
Referee: Ian Robinson

- Game rescheduled from 25 September 2004.

=== Round 19 ===
19 February 2005

(BP) Bedford Athletic	30 - 18	Fylde
	Report

Putnoe Woods
Attendance: 250
Referee: Chris Seeley

19 February 2005

(BP) Blaydon	24 - 36	Cleckheaton (BP)
	Report

Crow Trees
Attendance: 180
Referee: Andrew Gardner

19 February 2005

Darlington	18 - 18	Macclesfield
	Report

Blackwell Meadows
Attendance: 200
Referee: D Edmunds

19 February 2005

Dudley Kingswinford	7 - 39	Halifax (BP)
	Report

Heathbrook
Attendance: 260
Referee: Matthew Daubney

19 February 2005

(BP) Kendal	32 - 7	Darlington Mowden Park
	Report

Mint Bridge
Referee: Paul Dickens

19 February 2005

New Brighton	20 - 20	Bradford & Bingley
	Report

Hartsfield
Attendance: 250
Referee: Ian Robinson

19 February 2005

(BP) Rugby Lions	16 - 19	Tynedale
	Report

Webb Ellis Road
Attendance: 250
Referee: Darryl Chapman

=== Round 20 ===
26 February 2005

(BP) Bradford & Bingley	42 - 10	Kendal
	Report

Wagon Lane
Attendance: 280
Referee: Matthew Daubney

26 February 2005

(BP) Cleckheaton	24 - 23	Rugby Lions (2BP)
	Report

Cleckheaton Sports Club
Attendance: 350
Referee: Tim Wigglesworth

26 February 2005

(BP) Dudley Kingswinford	36 - 19	Bedford Athletic
	Report

Heathbrook
Attendance: 270
Referee: Richard Parker-Sedgmore

26 February 2005

Macclesfield	16 - 3	Blaydon
	Report

Priory Park
Attendance: 187
Referee: Alan Hughes

26 February 2005

(BP) Tynedale	19 - 26	New Brighton (BP)
	Report

Tynedale Park
Attendance: 190
Referee: Mick Reid

26 February 2005

Darlington Mowden Park	P - P	Fylde

- Postponed. Game rescheduled to 26 February 2005.

26 February 2005

Halifax	P - P	Darlington

- Postponed. Game rescheduled to 26 February 2005.

=== Round 21 ===
5 March 2005

Bedford Athletic	16 - 8	Darlington Mowden Park
	Report

Putnoe Woods
Attendance: 200
Referee: Paul Kimber

5 March 2005

Darlington	23 - 5	Dudley Kingswinford
	Report

Blackwell Meadows
Attendance: 150
Referee: Mick Reid

5 March 2005

Fylde	12 - 23	Bradford & Bingley
	Report

Woodlands Memorial Ground
Attendance: 180
Referee: Nigel Carrick

5 March 2005

Kendal	17 - 14	Tynedale (BP)
	Report

Mint Bridge
Attendance: 250
Referee: David Drury

5 March 2005

New Brighton	15 - 12	Cleckheaton (BP)
	Report

Hartsfield
Attendance: 300
Referee: Steve Walters

5 March 2005

(BP) Rugby Lions	13 - 17	Macclesfield
	Report

Webb Ellis Road
Attendance: 250
Referee: Rob Sheard

5 March 2005

Blaydon	C - C	Halifax

- Game would initially be postponed but due to fixture congestion was ultimately cancelled as the result would not have any impact on final league standings.

=== Round 22 ===
12 March 2005

Bradford & Bingley	13 - 8	Darlington Mowden Park (BP)
	Report

Wagon Lane
Attendance: 300
Referee: Ged Stone

12 March 2005

(BP) Cleckheaton	31 - 17	Kendal
	Report

Cleckheaton Sports Club
Attendance: 250
Referee: Darryl Chapman

12 March 2005

Darlington	25 - 18	Bedford Athletic (BP)
	Report

Blackwell Meadows
Attendance: 120
Referee: Alan Hughes

12 March 2005

Dudley Kingswinford	8 - 20	Blaydon
	Report

Heathbrook
Referee: David Drury

12 March 2005

(BP) Halifax	39 - 16	Rugby Lions
	Report

Ovenden Park
Attendance: 350
Referee: Ed Turnill

12 March 2005

(BP) Macclesfield	46 - 15	New Brighton
	Report

Priory Park
Attendance: 217
Referee: Guy Steel Bodge

12 March 2005

(BP) Tynedale	24 - 18	Fylde (BP)
	Report

Tynedale Park
Attendance: 110
Referee: Trevor Fisher

=== Round 23 ===
19 March 2005

Bedford Athletic	10 - 36	Bradford & Bingley (BP)
	Report

Putnoe Woods
Attendance: 150
Referee: Des Headington

19 March 2005

Blaydon	7 - 26	Darlington
	Report

Crow Trees
Attendance: 160
Referee: Matthew Daubney

19 March 2005

Darlington Mowden Park	18 - 11	Tynedale (BP)
	Report

Yiewsley Drive
Attendance: 127
Referee: Mick Reid

19 March 2005

(BP) Fylde	58 - 22	Cleckheaton (BP)
	Report

Woodlands Memorial Ground
Attendance: 262
Referee: Andrew Gardner

19 March 2005

Kendal	10 - 19	Macclesfield
	Report

Mint Bridge
Attendance: 200
Referee: Chris Seeley

19 March 2005

New Brighton	20 - 20	Halifax
	Report

Hartsfield
Attendance: 300
Referee: Trevor Fisher

19 March 2005

Rugby Lions	20 - 20	Dudley Kingswinford
	Report

Webb Ellis Road
Attendance: 230
Referee: Alan Hughes

=== Rounds 7, 9 & 14 (rescheduled games) ===
26 March 2005

(BP) Halifax	53 - 3	Cleckheaton
	Report

Ovenden Park
Attendance: 600
Referee: Brendan Fitzmaurice

- Game rescheduled from 20 November 2004.

26 March 2005

(BP) Kendal	25 - 27	Fylde (BP)
	Report

Mint Bridge
Attendance: 300
Referee: David Drury

- Game rescheduled from 6 November 2004.

26 March 2005

Tynedale	8 - 20	Macclesfield
	Report

Tynedale Park
Attendance: 220
Referee: Guy Steel Bodger

- Game rescheduled from 8 January 2005.

=== Round 24 ===
2 April 2005

(BP) Blaydon	44 - 16	Bedford Athletic
	Report

Crow Trees
Attendance: 160
Referee: Ged Stone

2 April 2005

Cleckheaton	8 - 32	Darlington Mowden Park (BP)
	Report

Cleckheaton Sports Club
Attendance: 310
Referee: R Steggall

2 April 2005

(BP) Darlington	31 - 6	Rugby Lions
	Report

Blackwell Meadows
Referee: Andrew Gardner

2 April 2005

Dudley Kingswinford	28 - 26	New Brighton (2BP)
	Report

Heathbrook
Attendance: 520
Referee: Richard Draper

2 April 2005

(BP) Halifax	67 - 26	Kendal (BP)
	Report

Ovenden Park
Attendance: 400
Referee: Adrian Hartwell

2 April 2005

Macclesfield	31 - 18	Fylde
	Report

Priory Park
Attendance: 347
Referee: D Edmunds

2 April 2005

Tynedale	16 - 13	Bradford & Bingley (BP)
	Report

Tynedale Park
Attendance: 170
Referee: B Fitzgerald

=== Round 25 ===
9 April 2005

(BP) Bradford & Bingley	25 - 13	Cleckheaton
	Report

Wagon Lane
Attendance: 295
Referee: Richard Parker-Sedgmore

9 April 2005

(BP) Darlington Mowden Park	41 - 25	Macclesfield
	Report

Yiewsley Drive
Attendance: 142
Referee: Des Headington

9 April 2005

(BP) Kendal	21 - 22	Dudley Kingswinford
	Report

Mint Bridge
Attendance: 210
Referee: Mick Reid

9 April 2005

Fylde	10 - 26	Halifax
	Report

Woodlands Memorial Ground
Attendance: 275
Referee: Chris Seeley

9 April 2005

New Brighton	21 - 8	Darlington
	Report

Hartsfield
Referee: Eric Woodmason

9 April 2005

Rugby Lions	19 - 18	Blaydon (BP)
	Report

Webb Ellis Road
Attendance: 350
Referee: David Drury

9 April 2005

Tynedale	19 - 18	Bedford Athletic (BP)
	Report

Tynedale Park
Attendance: 110
Referee: Matthew Daubney

=== Round 14 (rescheduled games) ===
16 April 2005

(BP) Bradford & Bingley	26 - 44	Halifax (BP)
	Report

Wagon Lane
Attendance: 700
Referee: Alan Hughes

- Game rescheduled from 8 January 2005.

16 April 2005

(BP) Fylde	47 - 18	Darlington
	Report

Woodlands Memorial Ground
Attendance: 175
Referee: Matthew Daubney

- Game rescheduled from 8 January 2005.

16 April 2005

Kendal	12 - 8	Blaydon (BP)
	Report

Mint Bridge
Attendance: 400
Referee: Andrew Gardner

- Game rescheduled from 8 January 2005.

=== Round 26 ===
23 April 2005

Bedford Athletic	15 - 37	Rugby Lions (BP)
	Report

Putnoe Woods
Attendance: 350
Referee: Eric Woodmason

23 April 2005

(BP) Blaydon	27 - 12	New Brighton
	Report

Crow Trees
Attendance: 180
Referee: David Drury

23 April 2005

(BP) Cleckheaton	41 - 6	Tynedale
	Report

Cleckheaton Sports Club
Attendance: 400
Referee: Ged Stone

23 April 2005

Darlington	31 - 25	Kendal (BP)
	Report

Blackwell Meadows
Attendance: 200
Referee: Ian Robinson

23 April 2005

Dudley Kingswinford	28 - 17	Fylde
	Report

Heathbrook
Attendance: 450
Referee: Rhys Davies

23 April 2005

(2BP) Halifax	36 - 38	Darlington Mowden Park (BP)
	Report

Ovenden Park
Attendance: 400
Referee: Guy Steel Bodger

23 April 2005

Macclesfield	18 - 26	Bradford & Bingley
	Report

Priory Park
Attendance: 437
Referee: B Fitzgerald

=== Round 20 (rescheduled games) ===
30 April 2005

(BP) Darlington Mowden Park	35 - 12	Fylde
	Report

Yiewsley Drive
Attendance: 163
Referee: Brendan Fitzmaurice

- Game rescheduled from 26 February 2005.

30 April 2005

(BP) Halifax	56 - 0	Darlington
	Report

Ovenden Park
Attendance: 350
Referee: Rhys Davies

- Game rescheduled from 26 February 2005.

=== Promotion play-off ===
The league runners up of National Division Three South and North would meet in a playoff game for promotion to National Division Two. Redruth were the southern division runners up and as they had a superior league record than northern runners-up, Macclesfield, they hosted the play-off match.

1 May 2005

Redruth	33 - 14	Macclesfield
	Report

The Recreation Ground
Attendance: 4,000
Referee: Nick Williams

== Total season attendances ==
Club	Home Games	Total	Average	Highest	Lowest	% Capacity
Bedford Athletic	10 (Note: Missing home attendances v Blaydon on 4 September 2004, Darlington on 25 September 2004 and New Brighton on 15 January 2005.)	2,050	205	350	100	41%
Blaydon	11 (Note: Note that Blaydon only played 12 home games due to a game cancellation - missing home attendance v Dudley Kingswinford on 25 September 2004.)	1,950	177	350	70	9%
Bradford & Bingley	9 (Note: Missing home attendances v Tynedale on 4 September 2004, Bedford Athletic on 11 September 2004, Fylde on 9 October 2004 and New Brighton on 30 October 2004.)	2,810	312	700	215	8%
Cleckheaton	12 (Note: Missing home attendance v Fylde on 11 September 2004.)	4,210	351	700	200	
Darlington	11 (Note: Missing home attendances v Blaydon on 11 September 2004 and Rugby Lions on 2 April 2005.)	2,320	211	500	120	5%
Darlington Mowden Park	10 (Note: Missing home attendances v Cleckheaton on 4 September 2004, Bradford & Bingley on 25 September 2004 and Dudley Kingswinford on 8 January 2005.)	1,999	200	512	110	
Dudley Kingswinford	10 (Note: Missing home attendances v Rugby Lions on 11 September 2004, Macclesfield on 6 November 2004 and Blaydon on 12 March 2005.)	3,260	326	520	200	14%
Fylde	11 (Note: Missing home attendances v Macclesfield on 4 September 2004 and Dudley Kingswinford on 11 December 2004.)	2,827	257	400	150	3%
Halifax	10 (Note: Missing home attendances v New Brighton on 11 September 2004, Blaydon on 9 October 2004 and Dudley Kingswinford on 30 October 2004.)	4,575	458	600	350	
Kendal	8 (Note: Missing home attendances v Halifax on 4 September 2004, Bradford & Bingley on 23 October 2004, Bedford Athletic on 13 November 2004, New Brighton on 22 January 2005 and Darlington Mowden Park on 19 February 2005.)	2,100	263	400	200	6%
Macclesfield	12 (Note: Missing home attendance v Kendal on 11 September 2004.)	3,526	294	437	183	24%
New Brighton	10 (Note: Missing home attendances v Dudley Kingswinford on 4 September 2004, Macclesfield on 25 September 2004 and Darlington on 9 April 2005.)	2,670	267	350	150	13%
Rugby Lions	11 (Note: Missing home attendances v Darlington on 4 September 2004 and Halifax on 25 September 2004.)	2,910	265	350	150	8%
Tynedale	11 (Note: Missing home attendances v Darlington Mowden Park on 11 September 2004 and Halifax on 27 November 2004.)	2,069	188	294	110	9%

== Individual statistics ==
- Note that points scorers includes tries as well as conversions, penalties and drop goals.

=== Top points scorers ===
Rank	Player	Team	Appearances	Points
1	(England) Tom Rhodes	Bradford & Bingley	25	275
2	(Samoa) Douglas Sanft	Halifax	23	270
3	(England) Michael Newell	Macclesfield	25	219
4	(England) David Kell	Darlington	23	198
5	(England) Will Massey	Tynedale	26	187
6	(England) Mark Bedworth	Darlington Mowden Park	13	168
7	(England) Dan Stephens	Kendal	21	154
8	(England) Dan Clappison	Blaydon	21	148
9	(England) Allan Mitchell	Rugby Lions	24	142
10	(England) Anthony Birley	New Brighton	22	141

=== Top try scorers ===
Rank	Player	Team	Appearances	Tries
1	(New Zealand) Anzac Luteru	Halifax	20	21
2	(England) John Ladell	Kendal	23	19
3	(New Zealand) Quentin King	Fylde	24	14
4	(Russia) Renier Volschenk	Bradford & Bingley	19	12
4	(England) Mark Frost	Macclesfield	22	12
4	(Tonga) Latu Makaafi	Bradford & Bingley	25	12
4	(Tonga) Lisiate Tafa	Bradford & Bingley	25	12
5	(New Zealand) Robert Afoa-Peterson	Halifax	21	11
5	(England) Ian Gowland	Dudley Kingswinford	25	11
5	(England) Will Massey	Tynedale	26	11

== Season records ==
=== Team ===
Largest home win — 70 pts

77 - 7 Bradford & Bingley at home to Dudley Kingswinford on 27 November 2004

Largest away win — 33 pts

36 - 3 Rugby Lions away to Dudley Kingswinford on 11 September 2004

Most points scored — 77 pts

77 - 7 Bradford & Bingley at home to Dudley Kingswinford on 27 November 2004

Most tries in a match — 10

Bradford & Bingley at home to Dudley Kingswinford on 27 November 2004

Most conversions in a match — 9

Bradford & Bingley at home to Dudley Kingswinford on 27 November 2004

Most penalties in a match — 6

Halifax away to Bradford & Bingley on 16 April 2005

Most drop goals in a match — 2 (x5)

Bradford & Bingley at home to New Brighton on 30 October 2004
Macclesfield at home to Halifax on 13 November 2004
Bradford & Bingley at home to Macclesfield on 11 December 2004
Macclesfield away to Dudley Kingswinford on 6 November 2004
Tynedale at home to Bradford & Bingley on 2 April 2005

=== Player ===
Most points in a match — 27

(England) Tom Rhodes for Bradford & Bingley at home to Dudley Kingswinford on 27 November 2004

Most tries in a match — 4

(England) Simon Mulholland for Kendal at home to Darlington on 11 December 2004

Most conversions in a match — 9

(England) Tom Rhodes for Bradford & Bingley at home to Dudley Kingswinford on 27 November 2004

Most penalties in a match — 6

(Samoa) Douglas Sanft for Halifax away to Bradford & Bingley on 16 April 2005

Most drop goals in a match — 2

(England) Tom Rhodes for Bradford & Bingley at home to New Brighton on 30 October 2004
(England) Michael Newell for Macclesfield at home to Halifax on 13 November 2004
(England) Tom Rhodes for Bradford & Bingley at home to Macclesfield on 11 December 2004
(England) Michael Newell for Macclesfield away to Dudley Kingswinford on 6 November 2004
(England) Gavin Beasley for Tynedale at home to Bradford & Bingley on 2 April 2005

=== Attendances ===
Highest — 700 (x2)

Cleckheaton at home to Halifax on 22 January 2005
Bradford & Bingley at home to Halifax on 16 April 2005

Lowest — 70

Blaydon at home to Kendal on 4 December 2004

Highest Average Attendance — 458

Halifax

Lowest Average Attendance — 177

Blaydon

== See also ==
- English Rugby Union Leagues
- English rugby union system
- Rugby union in England
