= 2004–05 National Division Three South =

Rugby union competition in England

- Countries: (England)
- Champions: Barking
- Runners-up: Redruth (also promoted)
- Relegated: Haywards Heath, Tabard, Weston-super-Mare
- Attendance: 44,315 (average 369 per match) (Note: Note that 60 home attendances are missing (see below) - so the total attendance will not be 100% accurate. The average attendance has also been taken into account with the missing games not included.)
- Highest attendance: 1,500; Redruth v North Walsham; 5 March 2005; Redruth v Barking; 12 March 2005
- Lowest attendance: 100; Reading v Tabard; 20 November 2004; Reading v Westcombe Park; 12 March 2005; Reading v Hertford; 2 April 2005
- Top point scorer: (England) Adam Westall (Lydney); 332 points
- Top try scorer: (New Zealand) Cam Avery (Havant); 23 tries

The 2004–05 National Division Three South was the fifth season (18th overall) of the fourth division (south) of the English domestic rugby union competition using the name National Division Three South. New teams to the division included Lydney who were relegated from 2003–04 National Division Two as well as Havant (champions) and Hertford (playoffs) who were promoted from London Division 1 while Reading came up as champions of South West Division 1. The season would also see the introduction of a new points system with 4 points being awarded for a win, 2 points being awarded for a draw (replacing the old system of 2 points for a win and 1 for a draw) with the addition of a bonus point being given for scoring 4 or more tries as well as a bonus point given if you manage to lose a game within 7 points of the victorious team. In terms of promotion the league champions would go straight up into National Division Two while the runners up would have a one-game playoff against the runners up from National Division Three North (at the home ground of the club with the superior league record) for the final promotion place.

At the end of the season Barking finished as champions with a fantastic record of 24 wins out of 26 games, finishing 12 points ahead of runners up Redruth, with the Cornish side perhaps having finished champions in a different season with just 3 defeats. Redruth would join Barking in the 2005–06 National Division Two by defeating the 2004–05 National Division Three North runners up Macclesfield in the north–south playoff in front of a huge crowd of 4,000 fans at the Recreation Ground in Redruth. At the other end of the table Haywards Heath and Tabard were the first teams to be relegated. Weston-super-Mare were more competitive but still went down in the final relegation place, 7 points off 11th placed Old Patesians. Haywards Heath and Tabard would drop down to London Division 1 while Weston-super-Mare went into South West Division 1.

== Participating teams and locations ==
Locations of the 2004-05 National Division Three South teams

Team	Stadium	Capacity	City/Area
Barking	Goresbrook	1,000	Becontree, Dagenham, London
Dings Crusaders	Landseer Avenue	1,500	Lockleaze, Bristol
Havant	Hook's Lane	2,000 (200 seats)	Havant, Hampshire
Haywards Heath	Whitemans Green		Cuckfield, Haywards Heath, West Sussex
Hertford	Highfields		Ware, Hertfordshire
Lydney	Regentsholme	3,000 (340 seats)	Lydney, Gloucestershire
North Walsham	Norwich Road	1,200	Scottow, North Walsham, Norfolk
Old Patesians	Everest Road		Cheltenham, Gloucestershire
Reading	Holme Park		Sonning, Reading, Berkshire
Redruth	The Recreation Ground	3,500 (580 seats)	Redruth, Cornwall
Southend	Warners Park	1,500 (150 seats)	Southend, Essex
Tabard	Cobden Hill		Radlett, Hertfordshire
Westcombe Park	Goddington Dene	3,200	Orpington, London
Weston-super-Mare	Recreation Ground	3,000	Weston-super-Mare, Somerset

== Final league table ==
2004–05 National Division Three South table
Pos	Team	Pld	W	D	L	PF	PA	PD	TB	LB	Pts	Qualification
1	Barking (C)	26	24	1	1	904	343	+561	17	1	116	Promoted
2	Redruth (P)	26	22	1	3	726	303	+423	12	2	104	Promotion play-off
3	North Walsham	26	18	0	8	556	387	+169	14	1	87	
4	Lydney	26	17	1	8	767	463	+304	14	3	87	
5	Hertford	26	14	1	11	588	505	+83	8	4	70	
6	Reading	26	13	0	13	674	743	−69	14	1	67	
7	Havant	26	12	1	13	664	609	+55	13	3	66	
8	Dings Crusaders	26	13	0	13	516	538	−22	6	4	62	
9	Westcombe Park	26	11	1	14	586	708	−122	9	1	56	
10	Southend	26	10	0	16	519	619	−100	5	4	49	
11	Old Patesians	26	9	1	16	527	622	−95	7	3	48	
12	Weston-super-Mare (R)	26	7	1	18	449	727	−278	8	3	41	Relegated
13	Tabard (R)	26	5	0	21	463	793	−330	4	5	29	Relegated
14	Haywards Heath (R)	26	3	0	23	387	966	−579	4	4	20	Relegated

Updated to match(es) played on 23-04-2005. Source: Rugby Statbunker
(C) Champion; (P) Promoted; (R) Relegated

== Results ==
=== Round 1 ===
4 September 2004

Barking	34 - 16	Havant
	Report

Goresbrook
Referee: David Grashoff

4 September 2004

Haywards Heath	16 - 29	Weston-super-Mare (BP)
	Report

Whitemans Green
Referee: Eric Woodmason

4 September 2004

Hertford	19 - 6	Reading
	Report

Highfields
Referee: Richard Parker-Sedgmore

4 September 2004

(BP) Lydney	38 - 29	Tabard (BP)
	Report

Regentsholme
Referee: Dale Newitt

4 September 2004

Old Patesians	6 - 29	Dings Crusaders (BP)
	Report

Everest Road
Referee: Andrew Bickle

4 September 2004

Southend	13 - 31	North Walsham (BP)
	Report

Warners Bridge Park
Referee: Des Headington

4 September 2004

Westcombe Park	18 - 35	Redruth (BP)
	Report

Goddington Dene
Referee: Mark Varnon

=== Round 2 ===
11 September 2004

Dings Crusaders	29 - 5	Hertford
	Report

Landseer Avenue
Referee: Terry Hall

11 September 2004

Haywards Heath	6 - 32	Barking (BP)
	Report

Whitemans Green
Referee: Mark Varnon

11 September 2004

(BP) North Walsham	28 - 17	Westcombe Park
	Report

Norwich Road
Referee: Paul Dickens

11 September 2004

(BP) Reading	37 - 8	Southend
	Report

Holme Park
Referee: Rhys Davies

11 September 2004

Redruth	18 - 7	Havant
	Report

The Recreation Ground
Referee: Eric Woodmason

11 September 2004

Tabard	17 - 11	Old Patesians (BP)
	Report

Cobden Hill

11 September 2004

(BP) Weston-super-Mare	12 - 17	Lydney
	Report

Recreation Ground
Referee: G O'Hara

=== Round 3 ===
25 September 2004

Barking	15 - 15	Redruth
	Report

Goresbrook
Attendance: 352
Referee: Ed Turnill

25 September 2004

Havant	15 - 24	North Walsham (BP)
	Report

Hook's Lane
Referee: Terry Hall

25 September 2004

(BP) Hertford	14 - 20	Tabard
	Report

Highfields
Attendance: 520
Referee: Guy Steel Bodger

25 September 2004

(BP) Lydney	50 - 8	Haywards Heath
	Report

Regentsholme
Attendance: 420
Referee: Rhys Davies

25 September 2004

(BP) Old Patesians	31 - 16	Weston-super-Mare
	Report

Everest Road
Referee: Steve Harland

25 September 2004

Southend	17 - 43	Dings Crusaders (BP)
	Report

Warners Bridge Park
Referee: David Sainsbury

25 September 2004

(BP) Westcombe Park	37 - 15	Reading
	Report

Goddington Dene
Attendance: 300
Referee: Andrew Bickle

=== Round 4 ===
9 October 2004

Dings Crusaders	25 - 17	Westcombe Park
	Report

Landseer Avenue
Attendance: 153
Referee: G O'Hara

9 October 2004

(BP) Haywards Heath	12 - 14	Old Patesians
	Report

Whitemans Green
Attendance: 200
Referee: Terry Hall

9 October 2004

(BP) Lydney	9 - 11	Barking
	Report

Regentsholme
Referee: Steve Harland

9 October 2004

North Walsham	15 - 14	Redruth (BP)
	Report

Norwich Road
Attendance: 450
Referee: Guy Steel Bodger

9 October 2004

(BP) Reading	31 - 19	Havant
	Report

Holme Park
Attendance: 250
Referee: Ian Robinson

9 October 2004

(BP) Tabard	22 - 16	Southend (BP)
	Report

Cobden Hill
Attendance: 200
Referee: Ed Turnill

9 October 2004

(BP) Weston-super-Mare	24 - 15	Hertford
	Report

Recreation Ground
Referee: Rhys Davies

=== Round 5 ===
23 October 2004

Barking	23 - 7	North Walsham
	Report

Goresbrook
Attendance: 250
Referee: Tim Miller

23 October 2004

Havant	17 - 10	Dings Crusaders (BP)
	Report

Hook's Lane
Referee: Paul Dickens

23 October 2004

Hertford	16 - 10	Haywards Heath (BP)
	Report

Highfields
Attendance: 720
Referee: Andrew Bickle

23 October 2004

Old Patesians	8 - 23	Lydney
	Report

Everest Road
Referee: Dale Newitt

23 October 2004

(BP) Redruth	33 - 10	Reading
	Report

The Recreation Ground
Attendance: 600
Referee: Richard Parker-Sedgmore

23 October 2004

Southend	21 - 15	Weston-super-Mare (BP)
	Report

Warners Bridge Park
Attendance: 115
Referee: Terry Hall

23 October 2004

(BP) Westcombe Park	32 - 15	Tabard
	Report

Goddington Dene
Attendance: 250
Referee: Brendan Fitzmaurice

=== Round 6 ===
30 October 2004

Dings Crusaders	23 - 12	Redruth
	Report

Landseer Avenue
Attendance: 250
Referee: Rhys Davies

30 October 2004

(BP) Haywards Heath	13 - 15	Southend
	Report

Whitemans Green
Attendance: 220
Referee: Paul Dickens

30 October 2004

Lydney	15 - 8	Hertford (BP)
	Report

Regentsholme
Referee: G O'Hara

30 October 2004

Old Patesians	14 - 13	Barking (BP)
	Report

Everest Road
Referee: Guy Steel Bodger

30 October 2004

(BP) Reading	14 - 19	North Walsham
	Report

Holme Park
Referee: Des Headington

30 October 2004

(2BP) Tabard	31 - 34	Havant (BP)
	Report

Cobden Hill
Referee: Terry Hall

30 October 2004

Weston-super-Mare	3 - 14	Westcombe Park
	Report

Recreation Ground
Referee: Steve Harland

=== Round 7 ===
6 November 2004

(BP) Barking	50 - 32	Reading (BP)
	Report

Goresbrook
Attendance: 206
Referee: Richard Parker-Sedgmore

6 November 2004

(BP) Havant	35 - 8	Weston-super-Mare
	Report

Hook's Lane
Attendance: 346
Referee: David Sainsbury

6 November 2004

(BP) Hertford	34 - 6	Old Patesians
	Report

Highfields
Attendance: 415
Referee: Chris Seeley

6 November 2004

(BP) North Walsham	32 - 12	Dings Crusaders
	Report

Norwich Road
Attendance: 425
Referee: Ed Turnill

6 November 2004

Redruth	23 - 3	Tabard
	Report

The Recreation Ground
Attendance: 620
Referee: Andrew Bickle

6 November 2004

Southend	14 - 28	Lydney (BP)
	Report

Warners Bridge Park
Attendance: 197
Referee: Mark Varnon

6 November 2004

Westcombe Park	P - P	Haywards Heath

- Postponed. Game rescheduled to 12 February 2005.

=== Round 8 ===
13 November 2004

(BP) Dings Crusaders	39 - 17	Reading
	Report

Landseer Avenue
Attendance: 427
Referee: Eric Woodmason

13 November 2004

Haywards Heath	22 - 30	Havant (BP)
	Report

Whitemans Green
Attendance: 250
Referee: David Grashoff

13 November 2004

Hertford	0 - 43	Barking (BP)
	Report

Highfields
Attendance: 380
Referee: Terry Hall

13 November 2004

(BP) Lydney	47 - 6	Westcombe Park
	Report

Regentsholme
Attendance: 570
Referee: Andrew Bickle

13 November 2004

(BP) Old Patesians	12 - 17	Southend
	Report

Everest Road
Referee: Martin Rodrigues

13 November 2004

(BP) Tabard	23 - 27	North Walsham (BP)
	Report

Cobden Hill
Referee: G O'Hara

13 November 2004

Weston-super-Mare	5 - 22	Redruth
	Report

Recreation Ground
Referee: Des Headington

=== Round 9 ===
20 November 2004

(BP) Barking	46 - 7	Dings Crusaders
	Report

Goresbrook
Referee: Steve Harland

20 November 2004

Havant	16 - 36	Lydney (BP)
	Report

Hook's Lane
Attendance: 347
Referee: Terry Hall

20 November 2004

(BP) North Walsham	37 - 0	Weston-super-Mare
	Report

Norwich Road
Referee: Paul Dickens

20 November 2004

Reading	19 - 13	Tabard (BP)
	Report

Holme Park
Attendance: 100
Referee: Martin Rodrigues

20 November 2004

(BP) Redruth	41 - 14	Haywards Heath
	Report

The Recreation Ground
Attendance: 646
Referee: Ed Turnill

20 November 2004

(BP) Southend	16 - 21	Hertford
	Report

Warners Bridge Park
Attendance: 152
Referee: Richard Phillips

20 November 2004

Westcombe Park	23 - 8	Old Patesians
	Report

Goddington Dene
Attendance: 200
Referee: Mark Varnon

=== Round 10 ===
27 November 2004

Haywards Heath	0 - 31	North Walsham (BP)
	Report

Whitemans Green
Attendance: 150
Referee: Mark Varnon

27 November 2004

Hertford	19 - 28	Westcombe Park (BP)
	Report

Highfields
Attendance: 345
Referee: Guy Steel Bodger

27 November 2004

(BP) Lydney	15 - 16	Redruth
	Report

Regentsholme
Referee: Tim Miller

27 November 2004

Old Patesians	27 - 20	Havant (BP)
	Report

Everest Road
Referee: Andrew Bickle

27 November 2004

Southend	23 - 40	Barking (BP)
	Report

Warners Bridge Park
Attendance: 160
Referee: G O'Hara

27 November 2004

Tabard	26 - 23	Dings Crusaders (BP)
	Report

Cobden Hill
Attendance: 200
Referee: Des Headington

27 November 2004

Weston-super-Mare	25 - 13	Reading
	Report

Recreation Ground
Attendance: 350

=== Round 11 ===
4 December 2004

(BP) Barking	47 - 12	Tabard
	Report

Goresbrook
Referee: Eric Woodmason

4 December 2004

Dings Crusaders	19 - 13	Weston-super-Mare (BP)
	Report

Landseer Avenue
Attendance: 205
Referee: Steve Harland

4 December 2004

(BP) Havant	36 - 10	Hertford
	Report

Hook's Lane
Attendance: 476
Referee: Mark Varnon

4 December 2004

North Walsham	7 - 3	Lydney (BP)
	Report

Norwich Road
Attendance: 1,000
Referee: Greg Garner

4 December 2004

(BP) Reading	33 - 26	Haywards Heath (2BP)
	Report

Holme Park
Attendance: 150
Referee: Richard Parker-Sedgmore

4 December 2004

Redruth	22 - 6	Old Patesians
	Report

The Recreation Ground
Attendance: 650
Referee: Rhys Davies

4 December 2004

Westcombe Park	16 - 25	Southend
	Report

Goddington Dene
Attendance: 200
Referee: Paul Dickens

=== Round 12 ===
11 December 2004

Haywards Heath	0 - 32	Dings Crusaders (BP)
	Report

Whitemans Green
Attendance: 140
Referee: Eric Woodmason

11 December 2004

(BP) Hertford	11 - 15	Redruth
	Report

Highfields
Attendance: 462
Referee: G O'Hara

11 December 2004

(BP) Lydney	50 - 20	Reading
	Report

Regentsholme
Attendance: 570
Referee: David Grashoff

11 December 2004

Old Patesians	17 - 47	North Walsham (BP)
	Report

Everest Road
Referee: Richard Parker-Sedgmore

11 December 2004

(BP) Southend	29 - 17	Havant
	Report

Warners Bridge Park
Attendance: 170
Referee: Ed Turnill

11 December 2004

Westcombe Park	10 - 58	Barking (BP)
	Report

Goddington Dene
Referee: Rhys Davies

11 December 2004

(BP) Weston-super-Mare	33 - 7	Tabard
	Report

Recreation Ground
Attendance: 290
Referee: Guy Steel Bodger

=== Round 13 ===
18 December 2004

(BP) Barking	58 - 3	Weston-super-Mare
	Report

Goresbrook
Attendance: 275
Referee: Terry Hall

18 December 2004

Dings Crusaders	21 - 10	Lydney
	Report

Landseer Avenue
Attendance: 253
Referee: Richard Phillips

18 December 2004

(BP) Havant	36 - 12	Westcombe Park
	Report

Hook's Lane
Attendance: 387
Referee: G O'Hara

18 December 2004

(BP) North Walsham	28 - 8	Hertford
	Report

Norwich Road
Attendance: 500
Referee: Guy Steel Bodger

18 December 2004

Reading	19 - 33	Old Patesians (BP)
	Report

Holme Park
Attendance: 150
Referee: Rhys Davies

18 December 2004

Redruth	11 - 0	Southend
	Report

The Recreation Ground
Attendance: 450
Referee: Steve Harland

18 December 2004

Tabard	10 - 30	Haywards Heath (BP)
	Report

Cobden Hill
Attendance: 200
Referee: Andrew Bickle

=== Round 14 ===
8 January 2005

Haywards Heath	15 - 25	Reading
	Report

Whitemans Green
Attendance: 250
Referee: Eric Woodmason

8 January 2005

(BP) Hertford	30 - 10	Havant
	Report

Highfields
Attendance: 400
Referee: G O'Hara

8 January 2005

Lydney	24 - 5	North Walsham
	Report

Regentsholme
Attendance: 560
Referee: Terry Hall

8 January 2005

Old Patesians	13 - 21	Redruth
	Report

Everest Road
Referee: Mick Reid

8 January 2005

(BP) Southend	38 - 24	Westcombe Park (BP)
	Report

Warners Bridge Park
Attendance: 230
Referee: Guy Steel Bodger

8 January 2005

Tabard	18 - 31	Barking (BP)
	Report

Cobden Hill
Attendance: 200
Referee: David Grashoff

8 January 2005

Weston-super-Mare	3 - 23	Dings Crusaders
	Report

Recreation Ground
Referee: Andrew Bickle

=== Round 15 ===
15 January 2005

(BP) Barking	27 - 14	Southend
	Report

Goresbrook
Attendance: 250
Referee: Richard Parker-Sedgmore

15 January 2005

Dings Crusaders	31 - 8	Tabard
	Report

Landseer Avenue
Attendance: 223
Referee: Rhys Davies

15 January 2005

(BP) Havant	41 - 10	Old Patesians
	Report

Hook's Lane
Attendance: 388
Referee: David Sainsbury

15 January 2005

(BP) North Walsham	44 - 15	Haywards Heath
	Report

Norwich Road
Attendance: 431
Referee: Rowan Kitt

15 January 2005

(BP) Reading	28 - 16	Weston-super-Mare
	Report

Holme Park
Attendance: 170
Referee: Ed Turnill

15 January 2005

(BP) Redruth	36 - 14	Lydney
	Report

The Recreation Ground
Attendance: 1,000
Referee: Mark Varnon

15 January 2005

Westcombe Park	25 - 33	Hertford (BP)
	Report

Goddington Dene
Attendance: 350
Referee: Greg Garner

=== Round 16 ===
22 January 2005

(BP) Dings Crusaders	0 - 5	Barking
	Report

Landseer Avenue
Attendance: 190
Referee: Steve Harland

22 January 2005

Haywards Heath	10 - 46	Redruth (BP)
	Report

Whitemans Green
Attendance: 220
Referee: G O'Hara

22 January 2005

Hertford	27 - 21	Southend (BP)
	Report

Highfields
Attendance: 500
Referee: Andrew Bickle

22 January 2005

(BP) Lydney	35 - 7	Havant
	Report

Regentsholme
Attendance: 320
Referee: Ged Stone

22 January 2005

(BP) Old Patesians	38 - 8	Westcombe Park
	Report

Everest Road
Referee: Des Headington

22 January 2005

Tabard	20 - 42	Reading (BP)
	Report

Cobden Hill
Attendance: 200
Referee: Mark Varnon

22 January 2005

Weston-super-Mare	11 - 25	North Walsham
	Report

Recreation Ground
Referee: Chris Seeley

=== Round 17 ===
29 January 2005

Barking	18 - 17	Hertford (BP)
	Report

Goresbrook
Attendance: 306
Referee: Mick Reid

29 January 2005

(BP) Havant	33 - 15	Haywards Heath
	Report

Hook's Lane
Attendance: 368
Referee: Chris Seeley

29 January 2005

(BP) North Walsham	27 - 9	Tabard
	Report

Norwich Road
Attendance: 426
Referee: Eric Woodmason

29 January 2005

(BP) Reading	33 - 18	Dings Crusaders
	Report

Holme Park
Referee: David Sainsbury

29 January 2005

(BP) Redruth	41 - 0	Weston-super-Mare
	Report

The Recreation Ground
Attendance: 800
Referee: Paul Dickens

29 January 2005

Southend	20 - 19	Old Patesians (BP)
	Report

Warners Bridge Park
Attendance: 140
Referee: G O'Hara

29 January 2005

Westcombe Park	19 - 19	Lydney
	Report

Goddington Dene
Attendance: 300
Referee: Guy Steel Bodger

=== Round 18 ===
5 February 2005

Dings Crusaders	3 - 15	North Walsham
	Report

Landseer Avenue
Attendance: 263
Referee: Dale Newitt

5 February 2005

(BP) Haywards Heath	38 - 12	Westcombe Park
	Report

Whitemans Green
Attendance: 150
Referee: Mark Varnon

5 February 2005

Lydney	28 - 10	Southend
	Report

Regentsholme
Referee: Steve Harland

5 February 2005

Old Patesians	23 - 23	Hertford
	Report

Everest Road
Referee: Greg Garner

5 February 2005

(BP) Reading	36 - 51	Barking (BP)
	Report

Holme Park
Attendance: 300
Referee: Terry Hall

5 February 2005

Tabard	7 - 62	Redruth (BP)
	Report

Cobden Hill
Attendance: 200
Referee: Paul Dickens

5 February 2005

Weston-super-Mare	25 - 25	Havant (BP)
	Report

Recreation Ground
Referee: Rhys Davies

=== Round 7 (rescheduled game) ===
12 February 2005

(BP) Westcombe Park	48 - 19	Haywards Heath
	Report

Goddington Dene
Attendance: 150

- Game rescheduled from 6 November 2004.

=== Round 19 ===
19 February 2005

(BP) Barking	32 - 19	Old Patesians
	Report

Goresbrook
Attendance: 185
Referee: Ed Turnill

19 February 2005

(BP) Havant	48 - 10	Tabard
	Report

Hook's Lane
Attendance: 467
Referee: Steve Harland

19 February 2005

Hertford	33 - 12	Lydney
	Report

Highfields
Attendance: 500
Referee: Des Headington

19 February 2005

(BP) North Walsham	31 - 12	Reading
	Report

Norwich Road
Attendance: 333
Referee: Tim Miller

19 February 2005

(BP) Redruth	34 - 3	Dings Crusaders
	Report

The Recreation Ground
Referee: David Grashoff

19 February 2005

(BP) Southend	45 - 14	Haywards Heath
	Report

Warners Bridge Park
Attendance: 130
Referee: Eric Woodmason

19 February 2005

Westcombe Park	39 - 29	Weston-super-Mare
	Report

Goddington Dene
Referee: G O'Hara

=== Round 20 ===
26 February 2005

Dings Crusaders	8 - 37	Havant (BP)
	Report

Landseer Avenue
Referee: Ged Stone

26 February 2005

Haywards Heath	8 - 61	Hertford (BP)
	Report

Whitemans Green
Attendance: 150
Referee: Paul Dickens

26 February 2005

(BP) Lydney	30 - 22	Old Patesians (BP)
	Report

Regentsholme
Referee: Terry Hall

26 February 2005

(BP) North Walsham	5 - 12	Barking
	Report

Norwich Road
Attendance: 800
Referee: David Grashoff

26 February 2005

Reading	23 - 48	Redruth (BP)
	Report

Holme Park
Attendance: 700
Referee: Mark Varnon

26 February 2005

(BP) Tabard	20 - 23	Westcombe Park
	Report

Cobden Hill
Attendance: 200
Referee: Terry Hall

26 February 2005

Weston-super-Mare	33 - 8	Southend
	Report

Recreation Ground
Referee: Andrew Bickle

=== Round 21 ===
5 March 2005

(BP) Barking	34 - 5	Lydney
	Report

Goresbrook
Referee: Terry Hall

5 March 2005

Havant	20 - 29	Reading (BP)
	Report

Hook's Lane
Attendance: 460
Referee: Des Headington

5 March 2005

(BP) Hertford	25 - 7	Weston-super-Mare
	Report

Highfields
Attendance: 420
Referee: Greg Garner

5 March 2005

(BP) Old Patesians	51 - 13	Haywards Heath
	Report

Everest Road
Attendance: 118
Referee: Guy Steel Bodger

5 March 2005

Redruth	23 - 5	North Walsham
	Report

The Recreation Ground
Attendance: 1,500
Referee: Steve Harland

5 March 2005

Southend	32 - 5	Tabard
	Report

Warners Bridge Park
Attendance: 130
Referee: Adrian Hartwell

5 March 2005

Westcombe Park	P - P	Dings Crusaders

- Game rescheduled for 26 March 2005.

=== Round 22 ===
12 March 2005

Dings Crusaders	24 - 19	Southend (BP)
	Report

Landseer Avenue
Referee: Rhys Davies

12 March 2005

Haywards Heath	15 - 77	Lydney (BP)
	Report

Whitemans Green
Attendance: 170
Referee: Richard Parker-Sedgmore

12 March 2005

North Walsham	17 - 32	Havant (BP)
	Report

Norwich Road
Attendance: 180
Referee: David Sainsbury

12 March 2005

(BP) Reading	35 - 29	Westcombe Park (2BP)
	Report

Holme Park
Attendance: 100
Referee: Andrew Bickle

12 March 2005

(BP) Redruth	14 - 16	Barking
	Report

The Recreation Ground
Attendance: 1,500
Referee: Eric Woodmason

12 March 2005

Tabard	21 - 36	Hertford (BP)
	Report

Cobden Hill
Attendance: 400
Referee: Paul Kimber

12 March 2005

Weston-super-Mare	28 - 44	Old Patesians (BP)
	Report

Recreation Ground
Referee: Nigel Carrick

=== Round 23 ===
19 March 2005

(BP) Barking	70 - 0	Haywards Heath
	Report

Goresbrook
Attendance: 200
Referee: Mark Varnon

19 March 2005

(BP) Havant	15 - 19	Redruth
	Report

Hook's Lane
Attendance: 627
Referee: Greg Garner

19 March 2005

(BP) Hertford	37 - 13	Dings Crusaders
	Report

Highfields
Attendance: 515
Referee: Rob Sheard

19 March 2005

(BP) Lydney	76 - 26	Weston-super-Mare (BP)
	Report

Regentsholme
Referee: G O'Hara

19 March 2005

(BP) Old Patesians	43 - 21	Tabard
	Report

Everest Road
Referee: Eric Woodmason

19 March 2005

Southend	20 - 30	Reading (BP)
	Report

Warners Bridge Park
Attendance: 114
Referee: Terry Hall

19 March 2005

Westcombe Park	26 - 7	North Walsham
	Report

Goddington Dene
Referee: Ed Turnill

=== Round 21 (rescheduled game) ===
26 March 2005

(BP) Westcombe Park	40 - 12	Dings Crusaders
	Report

Goddington Dene
Referee: Steve Harland

- Game rescheduled from 5 March 2005.

=== Round 24 ===
2 April 2005

(BP) Dings Crusaders	33 - 13	Old Patesians
	Report

Landseer Avenue
Referee: David Grashoff

2 April 2005

(BP) Havant	26 - 57	Barking (BP)
	Report

Hook's Lane
Attendance: 692
Referee: Richard Parker-Sedgmore

2 April 2005

North Walsham	8 - 25	Southend
	Report

Norwich Road
Attendance: 250
Referee: Guy Steel Bodger

2 April 2005

(BP) Reading	31 - 55	Hertford (BP)
	Report

Holme Park
Attendance: 100
Referee: Ed Turnill

2 April 2005

(BP) Redruth	36 - 15	Westcombe Park
	Report

The Recreation Ground
Attendance: 750
Referee: RG Davies

2 April 2005

Tabard	20 - 32	Lydney (BP)
	Report

Cobden Hill
Attendance: 200
Referee: Tim Miller

2 April 2005

(BP) Weston-super-Mare	40 - 21	Haywards Heath
	Report

Recreation Ground
Referee: Andrew Bickle

=== Round 25 ===
9 April 2005

Haywards Heath	17 - 55	Tabard (BP)
	Report

Whitemans Green
Attendance: 140
Referee: R Steggall

9 April 2005

Hertford	18 - 8	North Walsham
	Report

Highfields
Attendance: 605
Referee: Rhys Davies

9 April 2005

(BP) Lydney	46 - 10	Dings Crusaders
	Report

Regentsholme
Referee: Ian Robinson

9 April 2005

Old Patesians	21 - 34	Reading (BP)
	Report

Everest Road
Attendance: 198
Referee: Ged Stone

9 April 2005

Southend	27 - 37	Redruth (BP)
	Report

Warners Bridge Park
Referee: G O'Hara

9 April 2005

(BP) Westcombe Park	36 - 35	Havant (2BP)
	Report

Goddington Dene
Referee: Andrew Bickle

9 April 2005

Weston-super-Mare	23 - 46	Barking (BP)
	Report

Recreation Ground
Referee: Steve Walters

=== Round 26 ===
23 April 2005

(BP) Barking	53 - 12	Westcombe Park
	Report

Goresbrook
Attendance: 1,200
Referee: Paul Dickens

23 April 2005

(2BP) Dings Crusaders	26 - 30	Haywards Heath (BP)
	Report

Landseer Avenue
Attendance: 156
Referee: Tim Miller

23 April 2005

(BP) Havant	37 - 26	Southend (BP)
	Report

Hook's Lane
Attendance: 526
Referee: Steve Harland

23 April 2005

(BP) North Walsham	26 - 18	Old Patesians
	Report

Norwich Road
Attendance: 250
Referee: Ed Turnill

23 April 2005

(BP) Reading	50 - 28	Lydney (BP)
	Report

Holme Park
Attendance: 200
Referee: Des Headington

23 April 2005

(BP) Redruth	32 - 13	Hertford
	Report

The Recreation Ground
Attendance: 1,400
Referee: Richard Parker-Sedgmore

23 April 2005

(BP) Tabard	21 - 22	Weston-super-Mare (BP)
	Report

Cobden Hill
Attendance: 200
Referee: Mark Varnon

=== Promotion play-off ===
The league runners up of National Division Three South and North would meet in a playoff game for promotion to National Division Two. Redruth were the southern division runners up and as they had a superior league record than northern runners-up, Macclesfield, they hosted the play-off match.

1 May 2005

Redruth	33 - 14	Macclesfield
	Report

The Recreation Ground
Attendance: 4,000
Referee: Nick Williams

== Total season attendances ==
- Does not include promotion playoff game.

Club	Home Games	Total	Average	Highest	Lowest	% Capacity
Barking	9 (Note: Missing home attendances v Havant on 4 September 2004, Dings Crusaders on 20 November 2004, Tabard on 4 December 2004 and Lydney on 5 March 2005.)	3,224	358	1,200	185	36%
Dings Crusaders	9 (Note: Missing home attendances v Hertford on 11 September 2004, Havant on 26 February 2005, Southend on 12 March 2005 and Old Patesians on 2 April 2005.)	2,120	236	427	153	16%
Havant	10 (Note: Missing home attendances v North Walsham on 25 September 2004, Dings Crusaders on 23 October 2003 and Reading on 5 March 2005.)	5,084	462	692	346	23%
Haywards Heath	11 (Note: Missing home attendances v Weston-super-Mare on 4 September 2004 and Barking on 11 September 2004.)	2,040	185	250	140	
Hertford	12 (Note: Missing home attendance v Reading on 4 September 2004.)	5,782	482	720	345	
Lydney	5 (Note: Missing home attendances on 4 September 2004 v Tabard, Barking on 9 October 2004, Hertford on 30 October 2004, Redruth on 27 November 2004, Southend on 5 February 2005, Old Patesians on 26 February 2005, Weston-super-Mare on 19 March 2005 and Dings Crusaders on 9 April 2005.)	2,440	488	570	320	16%
North Walsham	11 (Note: Missing home attendances v Westcombe Park on 11 September 2004 and Weston-super-Mare on 20 November 2004.)	5,045	459	1,000	180	38%
Old Patesians	2 (Note: Missing home attendances v Dings Crusaders on 4 September 2004, Weston-super-Mare on 25 September 2004, Lyndey on 23 October 2004, Barking on 30 October 2004, Southend on 13 November 2004, Havant on 27 November 2004, North Walsham on 11 December 2004, Redruth on 8 January 2005, Westcombe Park on 22 January 2005, Hertford on 5 February 2005 and Tabard on 19 March 2005.)	316	158	198	118	
Reading	10 (Note: Missing home attendances v Southend on 11 September 2004, North Walsham on 30 October 2004 and Dings Crusaders on 29 January 2005.)	2,220	222	700	100	
Redruth	11 (Note: Missing home attendances v Havant on 11 September 2004 and Dings Crusaders on 19 February 2005.)	9,916	901	1,500	450	26%
Southend	10 (Note: Missing home attendances v North Walsham on 4 September 2004, Dings Crusaders on 25 September 2004 and Redruth on 9 April 2005.)	1,538	154	230	114	10%
Tabard	10 (Note: Missing home attendances v Old Patesians on 11 September 2004, Havant on 30 October 2004 and North Walsham on 13 November 2004.)	2,200	220	400	200	
Westcombe Park	7 (Note: Missing home attendances v Redruth on 4 September 2004, Barking on 11 December 2004, Weston-super-Mare on 19 February 2005, North Walsham on 19 March 2005, Dings Crusaders on 26 March 2005 and Havant on 9 April 2005..)	1,750	250	350	150	8%
Weston-super-Mare	2 (Note: Missing home attendances v Lydney on 11 September 2004, Hertford on 9 October 2004, Westcombe Park on 30 October 2004, Redruth on 13 November 2004, Dings Crusaders on 8 January 2005, North Walsham on 22 January 2005, Havant on 5 February 2005, Southend on 5 March 2005, Old Patesians on 12 March 2005 and Barking on 9 April 2005.)	640	320	350	290	11%

== Individual statistics ==
- Note that points scorers includes tries as well as conversions, penalties and drop goals.

=== Top points scorers ===
Rank	Player	Team	Appearances	Points
1	(England) Adam Westall	Lydney	26	332
2	(England) Neil Barrela	Hertford	25	298
3	(England) Ben Montgomery	Barking	24	236
4	(England) Rob Colbourne	Tabard	23	207
5	(England) Simon Hoult	Southend	20	177
6	(England) Owen Ashton	Haywards Heath	22	176
7	(England) Sid Claffey	Havant	23	175
8	(England) Bede Brown	Redruth	25	169
9	(England) Waylon Gasson	Dings Crusaders	22	136
10	(England) Alex Wallace	Reading	22	115
10	(New Zealand) Cam Avery	Havant	24	115

=== Top try scorers ===
Rank	Player	Team	Appearances	Tries
1	(New Zealand) Cam Avery	Havant	24	23
2	(England) Lloyd Williams	Barking	25	20
3	(England) Andy Macrae	Lydney	20	19
3	(England) Nathan Pedley	Redruth	26	19
4	(England) Neil Barrela	Hertford	25	18
5	(England) Sylvan Edwards	Dings Crusaders	24	17
5	(England) Tom Johnson	Reading	26	17
5	(England) Adam Westall	Lydney	26	17
6	(England) Jeremy Flynn	Reading	24	15
6	(England) Lewis Vinnicombe	Redruth	25	15

== Season records ==
=== Team ===
Largest home win — 70 pts

70 - 0 Barking at home to Haywards Heath on 19 March 2005

Largest away win — 62 pts

77 - 15 Lydney away to Haywards Heath on 12 March 2005

Most points scored — 77 pts

77 - 15 Lydney away to Haywards Heath on 12 March 2005

Most tries in a match — 12

Lydney at home to Weston-super-Mare on 19 March 2005

Most conversions in a match — 11

Lydney away to Haywards Heath on 12 March 2005

Most penalties in a match — 5 (x5)

Barking at home to Havant on 4 September 2004
Havant away to Tabard on 30 October 2004
Redruth at home to Tabard on 6 November 2004
Hertford at home to Southend on 22 January 2005
Haywards Heath away to Havant on 29 January 2005

Most drop goals in a match — 1

N/A - multiple teams

=== Player ===
Most points in a match — 45

(England) Adam Westall for Lydney away to Haywards Heath on 12 March 2005

Most tries in a match — 4 (x4)

(England) Tom Johnson for Reading at home to Dings Crusaders on 29 January 2005
(England) Adam Westall for Lydney away to Haywards Heath on 12 March 2005
(England) Lloyd Williams for Barking at home to Haywards Heath on 19 March 2005
(England) Tom Johnson for Reading at home to Lydney on 23 April 2005

Most conversions in a match — 11

(England) Adam Westall for Lydney away to Haywards Heath on 12 March 2005

Most penalties in a match — 5 (x2)

(England) Ben Montgomery for Barking at home to Havant on 4 September 2004
(England) Sid Claffey for Havant away to Tabard on 30 October 2004
(England) Bede Brown for Redruth at home to Tabard on 6 November 2004
(England) Neil Barrela for Hertford at home to Southend on 22 January 2005
(England) Owen Ashton for Haywards Heath away to Havant on 29 January 2005

Most drop goals in a match — 1

N/A - multiple players

=== Attendances ===
Highest — 1,500 (x2)

Redruth at home to North Walsham on 5 March 2005 & Barking on 12 March 2005

Lowest — 100 (x3)

Reading at home to Tabard on 20 November 2004, Westcombe Park on 12 March 2005 and Hertford on 2 April 2005

Highest Average Attendance — 901

Redruth

Lowest Average Attendance — 154

Southend

== See also ==
- English rugby union system
- Rugby union in England
