= 2005–06 National Division Two =

Rugby union competition in England

- Countries: England
- Champions: Moseley
- Runners-up: Waterloo (also promoted)
- Relegated: Orrell
- Attendance: 80,781 (average 478 per match) (Note: Note that 13 home attendances are missing (see below) - so the total attendance will not be 100% accurate. The average attendance has also been taken into account with the missing games not included.)
- Highest attendance: 1,759 Redruth at home to Launceston on 18 March 2006
- Lowest attendance: 100 Barking at home to Wharfedale on 3 December 2005
- Top point scorer: (England) Neil Hallett; Esher 302 points
- Top try scorer: (England) Matt Moore; Esher 24 tries

The 2005–06 National Division Two was the sixth version (nineteenth overall) of the third division of the English rugby union league system using the name National Division Two. New teams to the division included Henley Hawks and Orrell who were relegated from the 2004–05 National Division One, Halifax who were promoted from the 2004–05 National Division Three North as well as Barking (champions) and Redruth (runners up) who were promoted from the 2004–05 National Division Three South. Only one team would be relegated at the end of this season (instead of the usual three).

By the end of the season Moseley were league champions beating Waterloo to first place by just 2 points, with both sides being promoted to the 2006–07 National Division One. Orrell finished as the league's bottom side behind 13th place Harrogate and were relegated to the 2006–07 National Division Three North, making it two consecutive relegations for the Wigan based club.

== Participating teams and locations ==
Locations of the 2005-06 National Division Two teams

Team	Stadium	Capacity	City/Area
Barking	Goresbrook	1,000	Becontree, Dagenham, London
Blackheath	Rectory Field	3,500 (500 seats)	Blackheath, London
Esher	Molesey Road	3,000	Hersham, Surrey
Halifax	Ovenden Park		Halifax, West Yorkshire
Harrogate	Claro Road	4,500 (500 seats)	Harrogate, North Yorkshire
Henley Hawks	Dry Leas	4,000	Henley-on-Thames, Oxfordshire
Launceston	Polson Bridge	3,000	Launceston, Cornwall
Manchester	Grove Park	4,000	Cheadle Hulme, Greater Manchester
Moseley	Billesley Common	3,000+	Birmingham, West Midlands
Orrell	Edge Hall Road	5,300 (300 seats)	Orrell, Greater Manchester
Redruth	The Recreation Ground	3,500 (580 seats)	Redruth, Cornwall
Stourbridge	Stourton Park	3,500 (499 seats)	Stourbridge, West Midlands
Waterloo	St Anthony's Road	9,950 (950 seats)	Blundellsands, Merseyside
Wharfedale	The Avenue	2,000	Threshfield, Craven, North Yorkshire

== Final league table ==
2005–06 National Division Two table
Pos	Team	Pld	W	D	L	PF	PA	PD	B	Pts	Qualification
1	Moseley (C, P)	26	23	0	3	785	415	+370	20	112	Promoted
2	Waterloo (P)	26	22	2	2	801	370	+431	18	110	Promoted
3	Esher	26	18	1	7	739	407	+332	17	91	
4	Launceston	26	16	2	8	584	538	+46	8	76	
5	Wharfedale	26	12	4	10	531	550	−19	13	69	
6	Manchester	26	13	2	11	475	543	−68	8	64	
7	Barking	26	11	1	14	471	518	−47	12	58	
8	Stourbridge	26	11	1	14	462	605	−143	8	54	
9	Blackheath	26	10	0	16	503	622	−119	12	52	
10	Redruth	26	10	1	15	430	486	−56	9	51	
11	Halifax	26	9	1	16	482	589	−107	11	49	
12	Henley Hawks	26	9	0	17	475	544	−69	12	48	
13	Harrogate	26	5	1	20	476	682	−206	17	39	
14	Orrell (R)	26	5	0	21	390	735	−345	6	26	Relegated

Source: National Clubs Association and BBC Sport: Updated 2007-04-16 --- Current English Leagues
(C) Champion; (P) Promoted; (R) Relegated

== Results ==
=== Round 1 ===
3 September 2005

(BP) Barking	42 - 30	Launceston
	Report

Goresbrook
Attendance: 195
Referee: David Sainsbury

3 September 2005

(BP) Halifax	19 - 22	Stourbridge
	Report

Ovenden Park
Referee: Terry Hall

3 September 2005

(BP) Harrogate	13 - 14	Esher
	Report

Claro Road
Referee: Andrew Vertigan

3 September 2005

(BP) Henley Hawks	13 - 16	Waterloo
	Report

Dry Leas
Attendance: 281
Referee: Dale Newitt

3 September 2005

(BP) Moseley	27 - 8	Manchester
	Report

Billesley Common
Attendance: 525
Referee: Richard Draper

3 September 2005

Orrell	21 - 31	Blackheath (BP)
	Report

Edge Hall Road
Attendance: 327
Referee: Greg Garner

3 September 2005

(BP) Redruth	29 - 8	Wharfedale
	Report

The Recreation Ground
Attendance: 800
Referee: Richard Parker-Sedgmore

=== Round 2 ===
10 September 2005

Blackheath	30 - 14	Halifax
	Report

Rectory Field
Referee: Tim Miller

10 September 2005

Esher	27 - 8	Redruth
	Report

Molesey Road
Attendance: 510
Referee: Richard Phillips

10 September 2005

(BP) Harrogate	8 - 13	Barking
	Report

Claro Road
Attendance: 471
Referee: Brendan Fitzmaurice

10 September 2005

Manchester	18 - 6	Launceston
	Report

Grove Park
Attendance: 291
Referee: D Edmunds

10 September 2005

Stourbridge	7 - 20	Moseley
	Report

Stourton Park
Attendance: 960
Referee: Rowan Kitt

10 September 2005

(BP) Waterloo	51 - 0	Orrell
	Report

St Anthony's Road
Attendance: 605
Referee: Trevor Fisher

10 September 2005

(BP) Wharfedale	34 - 10	Henley Hawks
	Report

The Avenue
Referee: Guy Steel Bodger

=== Round 3 ===
17 September 2005

(BP) Barking	31 - 9	Manchester
	Report

Goresbrook
Attendance: 210
Referee: Terry Hall

17 September 2005

(BP) Halifax	19 - 20	Waterloo
	Report

Ovenden Park
Attendance: 450
Referee: Andrew Vertigan

17 September 2005

(BP) Henley Hawks	3 - 9	Esher
	Report

Dry Leas
Attendance: 385
Referee: Greg Garner

17 September 2005

Launceston	20 - 7	Stourbridge
	Report

Polson Bridge
Attendance: 543
Referee: Alan Biggs

17 September 2005

(BP) Moseley	36 - 6	Blackheath
	Report

Billesley Common
Attendance: 458
Referee: Ian Robinson

17 September 2005

Orrell	28 - 27	Wharfedale (2BP)
	Report

Edge Hall Road
Attendance: 326
Referee: Dale Newitt

17 September 2005

(BP) Redruth	34 - 15	Harrogate
	Report

The Recreation Ground
Attendance: 850
Referee: Steve Harland

=== Round 4 ===
24 September 2005

(BP) Blackheath	14 - 17	Launceston
	Report

Rectory Field
Attendance: 1,200
Referee: Richard Phillips

24 September 2005

(BP) Esher	46 - 3	Orrell
	Report

Molesey Road
Attendance: 360
Referee: David Sainsbury

24 September 2005

(BP) Harrogate	25 - 39	Henley Hawks (BP)
	Report

Claro Road
Attendance: 375
Referee: D Edmunds

24 September 2005

Redruth	21 - 8	Barking
	Report

The Recreation Ground
Attendance: 850
Referee: Eric Woodmason

24 September 2005

(2BP) Stourbridge	26 - 30	Manchester
	Report

Stourton Park
Attendance: 430
Referee: Trevor Fisher

24 September 2005

(2BP) Waterloo	31 - 37	Moseley (BP)
	Report

St Anthony's Road
Attendance: 451
Referee: Nick Williams

24 September 2005

Wharfedale	22 - 22	Halifax
	Report

The Avenue
Attendance: 475
Referee: Brendan Fitzmaurice

=== Round 5 ===
8 October 2005

(BP) Barking	9 - 14	Stourbridge
	Report

Goresbrook
Attendance: 193
Referee: Richard Phillips

8 October 2005

Halifax	0 - 20	Esher
	Report

Ovenden Park
Attendance: 400
Referee: Dale Newitt

8 October 2005

Henley Hawks	16 - 10	Redruth (BP)
	Report

Dry Leas
Attendance: 413
Referee: Terry Hall

8 October 2005

(BP) Launceston	12 - 18	Waterloo
	Report

Polson Bridge
Attendance: 720
Referee: Gareth Copsey

8 October 2005

Manchester	10 - 3	Blackheath (BP)
	Report

Grove Park
Attendance: 298
Referee: Greg Garner

8 October 2005

(BP) Moseley	39 - 3	Wharfedale
	Report

Billesley Common
Attendance: 373
Referee: Tim Wigglesworth

8 October 2005

(BP) Orrell	32 - 29	Harrogate (2BP)
	Report

Edge Hall Road
Referee: Chris Sharp

=== Round 6 ===
22 October 2005

(BP) Blackheath	20 - 23	Stourbridge
	Report

Rectory Field
Attendance: 750
Referee: Richard Parker-Sedgmore

22 October 2005

Esher	26 - 22	Moseley (BP)
	Report

Molesey Road
Attendance: 800
Referee: Geraint Ashton-Jones

22 October 2005

(BP) Harrogate	7 - 8	Halifax
	Report

Claro Road
Attendance: 380
Referee: Llyr Apgeraint-Roberts

22 October 2005

(BP) Henley Hawks	13 - 14	Barking
	Report

Dry Leas
Attendance: 412
Referee: David Sainsbury

22 October 2005

Redruth	13 - 10	Orrell
	Report

The Recreation Ground
Attendance: 1,000
Referee: Nick Williams

22 October 2005

(BP) Waterloo	35 - 12	Manchester
	Report

St Anthony's Road
Attendance: 560
Referee: Alan Biggs

22 October 2005

Wharfedale	22 - 22	Launceston
	Report

The Avenue
Attendance: 352
Referee: Richard Phillips

=== Round 7 ===
29 October 2005

Barking	27 - 8	Blackheath
	Report

Goresbrook
Attendance: 416
Referee: Ed Turnill

29 October 2005

Halifax	26 - 8	Redruth
	Report

Ovenden Park
Attendance: 439
Referee: Chris Sharp

29 October 2005

Launceston	10 - 35	Esher (BP)
	Report

Polson Bridge
Attendance: 477
Referee: Terry Hall

29 October 2005

(BP) Moseley	35 - 19	Harrogate
	Report

Billesley Common
Attendance: 620
Referee: Kitt Rowan

29 October 2005

Manchester	28 - 28	Wharfedale
	Report

Grove Park
Attendance: 179
Referee: Richard Draper

29 October 2005

Orrell	12 - 20	Henley Hawks
	Report

Edge Hall Road
Referee: D Edmunds

29 October 2005

Stourbridge	3 - 43	Waterloo (BP)
	Report

Stourton Park
Attendance: 365
Referee: Richard Phillips

=== Round 8 ===
12 November 2005

(BP) Esher	41 - 5	Manchester
	Report

Molesey Road
Attendance: 525

12 November 2005

Harrogate	8 - 30	Launceston (BP)
	Report

Claro Road
Attendance: 240
Referee: Greg Garner

12 November 2005

(BP) Henley Hawks	47 - 5	Halifax
	Report

Dry Leas
Attendance: 248

12 November 2005

Orrell	19 - 10	Barking
	Report

Edge Hall Road
Referee: Brendan Fitzmaurice

12 November 2005

(BP) Redruth	19 - 25	Moseley
	Report

The Recreation Ground
Attendance: 800
Referee: Alan Biggs

12 November 2005

(BP) Waterloo	27 - 14	Blackheath
	Report

St Anthony's Road
Attendance: 300
Referee: Trevor Fisher

12 November 2005

(BP) Wharfedale	26 - 30	Stourbridge
	Report

The Avenue
Attendance: 400
Referee: Rhys Davies

=== Round 9 ===
19 November 2005

(BP) Barking	29 - 33	Waterloo
	Report

Goresbrook
Referee: Richard Parker-Sedgmore

19 November 2005

Blackheath	18 - 29	Wharfedale (BP)
	Report

Rectory Field
Attendance: 725
Referee: Guy Steel Bodger

19 November 2005

Launceston	20 - 17	Redruth (BP)
	Report

Polson Bridge
Attendance: 1,280
Referee: Dale Newitt

19 November 2005

Manchester	21 - 15	Harrogate (BP)
	Report

Grove Park
Attendance: 195
Referee: Andrew Vertigan

19 November 2005

Moseley	22 - 19	Henley Hawks (BP)
	Report

Billesley Common
Attendance: 432
Referee: Greg Garner

19 November 2005

Stourbridge	14 - 27	Esher (BP)
	Report

Stourton Park
Attendance: 240

19 November 2005

Halifax	P - P	Orrell

- Postponed. Game rescheduled to 25 February 2006.

=== Round 10 ===
26 November 2005

Halifax	14 - 29	Barking (BP)
	Report

Ovenden Park
Attendance: 325
Referee: D Edmunds

26 November 2005

(BP) Harrogate	18 - 25	Stourbridge
	Report

Claro Road
Attendance: 290
Referee: Adrian Hartwell

26 November 2005

Wharfedale	21 - 21	Waterloo
	Report

The Avenue
Attendance: 408
Referee: Andrew Vertigan

26 November 2005

Esher	P - P	Blackheath

- Postponed. Game rescheduled to 4 February 2006.

26 November 2005

Henley Hawks	P - P	Launceston

- Postponed. Game rescheduled to 4 February 2006.

26 November 2005

Orrell	P - P	Moseley

- Postponed. Game rescheduled to 4 February 2006.

26 November 2005

Redruth	P - P	Manchester

- Postponed. Game rescheduled to 4 February 2006.

=== Round 11 ===
3 December 2005

(BP) Barking	11 - 15	Wharfedale
	Report

Goresbrook
Attendance: 100
Referee: Greg Garner

3 December 2005

(BP) Blackheath	30 - 26	Harrogate (BP)
	Report

Rectory Field
Attendance: 550
Referee: Ed Turnill

3 December 2005

Launceston	28 - 17	Orrell
	Report

Polson Bridge
Attendance: 630
Referee: Terry Hall

3 December 2005

Manchester	21 - 20	Henley Hawks (BP)
	Report

Grove Park
Attendance: 203
Referee: Chris Sharp

3 December 2005

Moseley	18 - 9	Halifax
	Report

Billesley Common
Attendance: 502
Referee: Alan Biggs

3 December 2005

Stourbridge	6 - 25	Redruth
	Report

Stourton Park
Attendance: 280
Referee: Trevor Fisher

3 December 2005

Waterloo	16 - 16	Esher
	Report

St Anthony's Road
Attendance: 500
Referee: Tim Wigglesworth

=== Round 12 ===
10 December 2005

(BP) Esher	35 - 11	Wharfedale
	Report

Molesey Road
Attendance: 530
Referee: Nick Williams

10 December 2005

Halifax	20 - 10	Launceston
	Report

Ovenden Park
Attendance: 400
Referee: Brendan Fitzmaurice

10 December 2005

Harrogate	7 - 32	Waterloo (BP)
	Report

Claro Road
Attendance: 324
Referee: Alan Biggs

10 December 2005

Henley Hawks	30 - 5	Stourbridge
	Report

Dry Leas
Attendance: 346
Referee: Ed Turnill

10 December 2005

(BP) Moseley	47 - 3	Barking
	Report

Billesley Common
Attendance: 508
Referee: Richard Phillips

10 December 2005

(BP) Orrell	13 - 16	Manchester
	Report

Edge Hall Road
Attendance: 245
Referee: Greg Garner

10 December 2005

(BP) Redruth	30 - 8	Blackheath
	Report

The Recreation Ground
Attendance: 752
Referee: Richard Parker-Sedgmore

=== Round 13 ===
17 December 2005

Barking	17 - 15	Esher
	Report

Goresbrook
Attendance: 306
Referee: Richard Parker-Sedgmore

17 December 2005

(BP) Blackheath	38 - 22	Henley Hawks
	Report

Rectory Field
Attendance: 495
Referee: Gareth Copsey

17 December 2005

Launceston	28 - 7	Moseley
	Report

Polson Bridge
Attendance: 463
Referee: Nick Williams

17 December 2005

(BP) Manchester	28 - 23	Halifax (BP)
	Report

Grove Park
Attendance: 279
Referee: Trevor Fisher

17 December 2005

(BP) Stourbridge	37 - 9	Orrell
	Report

Stourton Park
Attendance: 270
Referee: Greg Garner

17 December 2005

(BP) Waterloo	43 - 15	Redruth
	Report

St Anthony's Road
Attendance: 475
Referee: Steve Lander

17 December 2005

Wharfedale	19 - 18	Harrogate (BP)
	Report

The Avenue
Attendance: 700
Referee: Richard Phillips

=== Round 14 ===
7 January 2006

(BP) Barking	35 - 25	Harrogate (BP)
	Report

Goresbrook
Attendance: 194
Referee: Greg Garner

7 January 2006

Halifax	27 - 24	Blackheath (BP)
	Report

Ovenden Park
Attendance: 400
Referee: Andrew Vertigan

7 January 2006

Henley Hawks	6 - 30	Wharfedale (BP)
	Report

Dry Leas
Attendance: 322
Referee: Richard Phillips

7 January 2006

(BP) Launceston	40 - 15	Manchester
	Report

Polson Bridge
Attendance: 428
Referee: Ed Turnill

7 January 2006

(BP) Moseley	41 - 5	Stourbridge
	Report

Billesley Common
Attendance: 593
Referee: Gareth Copsey

7 January 2006

Orrell	0 - 31	Waterloo (BP)
	Report

Edge Hall Road
Attendance: 474
Referee: Adrian Hartwell

7 January 2006

Redruth	23 - 21	Esher (BP)
	Report

The Recreation Ground
Attendance: 721
Referee: Terry Hall

=== Round 15 ===
14 January 2006

(BP) Blackheath	24 - 29	Moseley (BP)
	Report

Rectory Field
Attendance: 650
Referee: Nick Williams

14 January 2006

(BP) Esher	40 - 6	Henley Hawks
	Report

Molesey Road
Attendance: 435
Referee: Alan Biggs

14 January 2006

(BP) Harrogate	12 - 13	Redruth
	Report

Claro Road
Attendance: 312
Referee: Brendan Fitzmaurice

14 January 2006

(BP) Manchester	13 - 18	Barking
	Report

Grove Park
Attendance: 288
Referee: Adrian Hartwell

14 January 2006

Stourbridge	25 - 38	Launceston (BP)
	Report

Stourton Park
Attendance: 270
Referee: Richard Draper

14 January 2006

(BP) Waterloo	39 - 17	Halifax
	Report

St Anthony's Road
Attendance: 560
Referee: Steve Lander

14 January 2006

Wharfedale	31 - 20	Orrell
	Report

The Avenue
Attendance: 600
Referee: Richard Parker-Sedgemore

=== Round 16 ===
21 January 2006

Barking	17 - 10	Redruth (BP)
	Report

Goresbrook
Attendance: 210
Referee: Geraint Ashton-Jones

21 January 2006

Halifax	16 - 9	Wharfedale (BP)
	Report

Ovenden Park
Attendance: 720
Referee: Trevor Fisher

21 January 2006

(2BP) Henley Hawks	31 - 32	Harrogate (BP)
	Report

Dry Leas
Attendance: 377
Referee: Steve Lander

21 January 2006

Launceston	31 - 15	Blackheath
	Report

Polson Bridge
Attendance: 732
Referee: Ed Turnill

21 January 2006

Manchester	19 - 5	Stourbridge
	Report

Grove Park
Attendance: 267
Referee: Guy Steel Bodger

21 January 2006

Moseley	19 - 13	Waterloo (BP)
	Report

Billesley Common
Attendance: 995
Referee: Dale Newitt

21 January 2006

Orrell	23 - 36	Esher (BP)
	Report

Edge Hall Road
Referee: Richard Draper

=== Round 17 ===
28 January 2006

Blackheath	23 - 17	Manchester (BP)
	Report

Rectory Field
Attendance: 500
Referee: Guy Steel Bodger

28 January 2006

(BP) Esher	59 - 6	Halifax
	Report

Molesey Road
Attendance: 560
Referee: Geraint Ashton-Jones

28 January 2006

(BP) Harrogate	29 - 3	Orrell
	Report

Claro Road
Referee: Brendan Fitzmaurice

28 January 2006

Redruth	23 - 13	Henley Hawks
	Report

The Recreation Ground
Attendance: 782
Referee: Nick Williams

28 January 2006

Stourbridge	13 - 13	Barking
	Report

Stourton Park
Attendance: 240
Referee: Richard Parker-Sedgmore

28 January 2006

(BP) Waterloo	43 - 31	Launceston (BP)
	Report

St Anthony's Road
Attendance: 562
Referee: Terry Hall

28 January 2006

(2BP) Wharfedale	30 - 35	Moseley (BP)
	Report

The Avenue
Attendance: 460
Referee: Andrew Vertigan

=== Round 10 (rescheduled games) ===
4 February 2006

(BP) Esher	40 - 17	Blackheath
	Report

Molesey Road
Attendance: 425
Referee: Richard Phillips

- Game rescheduled from 26 November 2005.

4 February 2006

(BP) Henley Hawks	18 - 22	Launceston
	Report

Dry Leas
Referee: Gareth Copsey

- Game rescheduled from 26 November 2005.

4 February 2006

Orrell	22 - 37	Moseley (BP)
	Report

Edge Hall Road
Referee: Ed Turnill

- Game rescheduled from 26 November 2005.

4 February 2006

(BP) Redruth	14 - 18	Manchester
	Report

The Recreation Ground
Attendance: 656
Referee: Terry Hall

- Game rescheduled from 26 November 2005.

=== Round 18 ===
11 February 2006

(BP) Barking	20 - 22	Henley Hawks
	Report

Goresbrook
Referee: Richard Phillips

11 February 2006

(BP) Halifax	32 - 7	Harrogate
	Report

Ovenden Park
Attendance: 490
Referee: Richard Draper

11 February 2006

Launceston	24 - 22	Wharfedale (2BP)
	Report

Polson Bridge
Attendance: 442
Referee: Glenn O'Hara

11 February 2006

Manchester	16 - 25	Waterloo
	Report

Grove Park
Attendance: 345
Referee: Ed Turnill

11 February 2006

(BP) Moseley	35 - 21	Esher
	Report

Billesley Common
Attendance: 895
Referee: Gareth Copsey

11 February 2006

(BP) Stourbridge	18 - 19	Blackheath
	Report

Stourton Park
Attendance: 275
Referee: Alan Biggs

11 February 2006

Orrell	P - P	Redruth

- Postponed. Game rescheduled to 11 March 2006.

=== Round 19 ===
18 February 2006

Blackheath	8 - 3	Barking (BP)
	Report

Rectory Field
Attendance: 650
Referee: Guy Steel Bodger

18 February 2006

(BP) Esher	13 - 20	Launceston
	Report

Molesey Road
Attendance: 460
Referee: Alan Biggs

18 February 2006

(BP) Harrogate	24 - 39	Moseley (BP)
	Report

Claro Road
Attendance: 347
Referee: Steve Lander

18 February 2006

Henley Hawks	26 - 20	Orrell (BP)
	Report

Dry Leas
Attendance: 345
Referee: Terry Hall

18 February 2006

Redruth	17 - 10	Halifax (BP)
	Report

The Recreation Ground
Attendance: 753
Referee: Richard Parker-Sedgmore

18 February 2006

(BP) Waterloo	42 - 19	Stourbridge
	Report

St Anthony's Road
Attendance: 500
Referee: Mark Wilson

18 February 2006

Wharfedale	19 - 18	Manchester (BP)
	Report

The Avenue
Attendance: 400
Referee: Rob Sheard

=== Round 9 (rescheduled game) ===
25 February 2006

(BP) Halifax	29 - 3	Orrell
	Report

Ovenden Park
Attendance: 357
Referee: Andrew Vertigan

- Game rescheduled from 19 November 2005.

=== Round 20 ===
4 March 2006

Barking	28 - 11	Orrell
	Report

Goresbrook
Attendance: 150
Referee: Ed Turnill

4 March 2006

Blackheath	17 - 34	Waterloo (BP)
	Report

Rectory Field
Attendance: 650
Referee: Richard Phillips

4 March 2006

(BP) Launceston	33 - 40	Harrogate (BP)
	Report

Polson Bridge
Attendance: 630
Referee: Terry Hall

4 March 2006

(BP) Manchester	29 - 40	Esher (BP)
	Report

Grove Park
Attendance: 321
Referee: Andrew Vertigan

4 March 2006

(BP) Moseley	27 - 13	Redruth
	Report

Billesley Common
Attendance: 762
Referee: Geraint Ashton-Jones

4 March 2006

(BP) Stourbridge	28 - 7	Wharfedale
	Report

Stourton Park
Attendance: 280
Referee: Rob Sheard

4 March 2006

Halifax	P - P	Henley Hawks

- Postponed. Game rescheduled to 11 March 2006.

=== Rounds 18 & 20 (rescheduled games) ===
11 March 2006

(BP) Halifax	41 - 23	Henley Hawks
	Report

Ovenden Park
Attendance: 300
Referee: Mark Wilson

- Game rescheduled from 4 March 2006.

11 March 2006

(BP) Orrell	34 - 7	Redruth
	Report

Edge Hall Road
Attendance: 168
Referee: Rob Sheard

- Game rescheduled from 11 February 2006.

=== Round 21 ===
18 March 2006

(BP) Esher	37 - 22	Stourbridge (BP)
	Report

Molesey Road
Attendance: 320
Referee: Ed Turnill

18 March 2006

Henley Hawks	10 - 18	Moseley
	Report

Dry Leas
Attendance: 170
Referee: Richard Phillips

18 March 2006

Harrogate	19 - 19	Manchester
	Report

Claro Road
Attendance: 310
Referee: Terry Hall

18 March 2006

Orrell	22 - 18	Halifax (BP)
	Report

Edge Hall Road
Attendance: 250
Referee: Brendan Fitzmaurice

18 March 2006

Redruth	10 - 10	Launceston
	Report

The Recreation Ground
Attendance: 1,759
Referee: Nick Williams

18 March 2006

Waterloo	27 - 6	Barking
	Report

St Anthony's Road
Attendance: 182
Referee: Richard Draper

18 March 2006

Wharfedale	30 - 17	Blackheath
	Report

The Avenue
Attendance: 420
Referee: Mark Wilson

=== Round 22 ===
25 March 2006

Barking	8 - 26	Halifax
	Report

Goresbrook
Attendance: 150
Referee: Geraint Ashton-Jones

25 March 2006

Blackheath	28 - 19	Esher
	Report

Rectory Field
Attendance: 650
Referee: Alan Biggs

25 March 2006

Launceston	6 - 3	Henley Hawks (BP)
	Report

Polson Bridge
Attendance: 503
Referee: Steve Harland

25 March 2006

Manchester	13 - 7	Redruth (BP)
	Report

Grove Park
Attendance: 311
Referee: Trevor Fisher

25 March 2006

(BP) Moseley	46 - 7	Orrell
	Report

Billesley Common
Attendance: 767
Referee: Phil Smith

25 March 2006

Stourbridge	13 - 30	Harrogate
	Report

Stourton Park
Attendance: 310
Referee: Chris Sharp

25 March 2006

(BP) Waterloo	32 - 8	Wharfedale
	Report

St Anthony's Road
Attendance: 460
Referee: Steve Lander

=== Round 23 ===
1 April 2006

Esher	7 - 41	Waterloo (BP)
	Report

Molesey Road
Attendance: 740
Referee: Geraint Ashton-Jones

1 April 2006

Halifax	9 - 22	Moseley (BP)
	Report

Ovenden Park
Attendance: 492
Referee: Greg Garner

1 April 2006

(BP) Harrogate	30 - 24	Blackheath (BP)
	Report

Claro Road
Attendance: 402
Referee: Trevor Fisher

1 April 2006

Henley Hawks	21 - 12	Manchester
	Report

Dry Leas
Attendance: 350
Referee: Richard Parker-Sedgmore

1 April 2006

(BP) Orrell	15 - 21	Launceston
	Report

Edge Hall Road
Attendance: 206
Referee: Terry Hall

1 April 2006

Redruth	12 - 24	Stourbridge (BP)
	Report

The Recreation Ground
Attendance: 763
Referee: Richard Phillips

1 April 2006

(BP) Wharfedale	20 - 10	Barking
	Report

The Avenue
Attendance: 385
Referee: Andrew Vertigan

=== Round 24 ===
8 April 2006

(2BP) Barking	29 - 34	Moseley (BP)
	Report

Goresbrook
Attendance: 300
Referee: Gareth Copsey

8 April 2006

(BP) Blackheath	29 - 25	Redruth (BP)
	Report

Rectory Field
Attendance: 650
Referee: Geraint Ashton-Jones

8 April 2006

(BP) Launceston	29 - 23	Halifax (BP)
	Report

Polson Bridge
Attendance: 511
Referee: Richard Parker-Sedgmore

8 April 2006

(BP) Manchester	30 - 15	Orrell
	Report

Grove Park
Attendance: 347
Referee: Chris Sharp

8 April 2006

Stourbridge	15 - 8	Henley Hawks (BP)
	Report

Stourton Park
Attendance: 315
Referee: Rob Sheard

8 April 2006

(BP) Waterloo	35 - 0	Harrogate
	Report

St Anthony's Road
Attendance: 510
Referee: Guy Steel Bodger

8 April 2006

Wharfedale	17 - 13	Esher (BP)
	Report

The Avenue
Attendance: 350
Referee: Trevor Fisher

=== Round 25 ===
22 April 2006

(BP) Esher	29 - 13	Barking
	Report

Molesey Road
Attendance: 455
Referee: Ed Turnill

22 April 2006

Halifax	16 - 32	Manchester (BP)
	Report

Ovenden Park
Attendance: 595
Referee: Llyr Apgeraint-Roberts

22 April 2006

Harrogate	5 - 18	Wharfedale
	Report

Claro Road
Attendance: 650
Referee: Dale Newitt

22 April 2006

Henley Hawks	16 - 10	Blackheath (BP)
	Report

Dry Leas
Attendance: 325
Referee: Glenn O'Hara

22 April 2006

(BP) Moseley	43 - 12	Launceston
	Report

Billesley Common
Attendance: 998
Referee: Steve Lander

22 April 2006

Orrell	10 - 20	Stourbridge
	Report

Edge Hall Road
Attendance: 263
Referee: Nick Williams

22 April 2006

Redruth	12 - 21	Waterloo
	Report

The Recreation Ground
Attendance: 797
Referee: Richard Parker-Sedgmore

=== Round 26 ===
29 April 2006

(BP) Blackheath	38 - 21	Orrell
	Report

Rectory Field
Attendance: 690
Referee: Ed Turnill

29 April 2006

(BP) Esher	55 - 15	Harrogate
	Report

Molesey Road
Attendance: 650
Referee: Geraint Ashton-Jones

29 April 2006

(BP) Launceston	34 - 28	Barking (2BP)
	Report

Polson Bridge
Attendance: 501
Referee: Steve Harland

29 April 2006

Manchester	18 - 15	Moseley (BP)
	Report

Grove Park
Attendance: 428
Referee: Revis Phillips

29 April 2006

(BP) Stourbridge	36 - 33	Halifax (2BP)
	Report

Stourton Park
Attendance: 315
Referee: Tim Wigglesworth

29 April 2006

(BP) Waterloo	34 - 20	Henley Hawks
	Report

St Anthony's Road
Attendance: 850
Referee: Chris Sharp

29 April 2006

(BP) Wharfedale	25 - 15	Redruth
	Report

The Avenue
Attendance: 387
Referee: Ian Robinson

== Total season attendances ==
Club	Home Games	Total	Average	Highest	Lowest	% Capacity
Barking	11 (Note: Missing home attendances v Waterloo on 19 November 2005 & Henley Hawks on 11 February 2006.)	2,274	207	416	100	21%
Blackheath	12 (Note: Missing home attendance v Halifax on 10 September 2005.)	8,160	680	1,200	495	19%
Esher	13	6,920	532	800	320	18%
Halifax	12 (Note: Missing home attendance v Stourbridge on 4 September 2005.)	5,368	447	720	300	N/A
Harrogate	11 (Note: Missing home attendances v Esher on 4 September 2005 & Orrell on 28 January 2006.)	4,101	373	650	240	8%
Henley Hawks	12 (Note: Missing home attendance v Launceston on 4 February 2006.)	3,974	331	413	170	8%
Launceston	13	7,860	605	1,280	428	20%
Manchester	13	3,752	289	428	179	7%
Moseley	13	8,428	648	998	373	22%
Orrell	8 (Note: Missing home attendances v Harrogate on 8 October 2005, Henley Hawks on 29 October 2005, Barking on 12 November 2005, Esher on 21 January 2006 & Moseley on 4 February 2006.)	2,259	282	474	168	5%
Redruth	13	11,283	868	1,759	656	25%
Stourbridge	13	4,550	350	960	240	10%
Waterloo	13	6,515	501	850	182	5%
Wharfedale	12 (Note: Missing home attendance v Henley Hawks on 10 September 2005.)	5,337	445	700	350	22%

== Individual statistics ==
- Note that points scorers includes tries as well as conversions, penalties and drop goals.

=== Top points scorers ===
Rank	Player	Team	Appearances	Points
1	(England) Neil Hallett	Esher	26	302
2	(England) Oliver Thomas	Moseley	24	253
3	(England) Mark Bedworth	Wharfedale	24	241
4	(England) Stuart Alred	Launceston	18	232
5	(England) Neil Hunter	Waterloo	21	208
6	(Italy) Corrado Pilat	Barking	23	197
7	(Ireland) Simon Mason	Orrell	22	170
8	(England) Mitch Burton	Henley Hawks	20	150
9	(England) Andre Wilson	Manchester	25	146
10	(England) Stephen Nutt	Waterloo	20	122

=== Top try scorers ===
Rank	Player	Team	Appearances	Tries
1	(England) Matt Moore	Esher	23	24
2	(England) Nathan Bressington	Moseley	26	20
3	(England) Neil Kerfoot	Waterloo	26	18
4	(England) Freeman Payne	Waterloo	26	16
5	(England) Stephen Parsons	Harrogate	26	15
6	(England) Dean Bick	Moseley	21	14
7	(England) Lewis Vinnicombe	Redruth	22	13
7	(England) Craig Aikman	Waterloo	23	13
7	(Samoa) Felise Ah - Ling	Barking	23	13
8	(Italy) Warren Spragg	Orrell	25	12

== Season records ==
=== Team ===
Largest home win — 53 pts

59 - 6 Esher at home to Halifax on 28 January 2006

Largest away win — 40 pts

43 - 3 Waterloo away to Stourbridge on 29 October 2005

Most points scored — 59 pts

59 - 6 Esher at home to Halifax on 28 January 2006

Most tries in a match — 9

Esher at home to Halifax on 28 January 2006

Most conversions in a match — 7

Esher at home to Halifax on 28 January 2006

Most penalties in a match — 8 (x2)

Barking at home to Manchester on 17 September 2005
Launceston at home to Blackheath on 21 January 2006

Most drop goals in a match — 2

Henley Hawks at home to Barking on 11 February 2006

=== Player ===
Most points in a match — 26 (x2)

(Italy) Corrado Pilat for Barking at home to Manchester on 17 September 2005
(England) Stuart Alred for Launceston at home to Blackheath on 21 January 2006

Most tries in a match — 4 (x2)

(Samoa) Felise Ah-Ling for Barking at home to Launceston on 3 September 2005
(England) Nathan Bressington for Moseley away to Harrogate on 18 February 2006

Most conversions in a match — 7

(England) Matthew Leek for Esher at home to Halifax on 28 January 2006

Most penalties in a match — 8 (x2)

(Italy) Corrado Pilat for Barking at home to Manchester on 17 September 2005
(England) Stuart Alred for Launceston at home to Blackheath on 21 January 2006

Most drop goals in a match — 1

N/A - multiple players

=== Attendances ===
Highest — 1,759

Redruth at home to Launceston on 18 March 2006

Lowest — 100

Barking at home to Wharfedale on 3 December 2005

Highest Average Attendance — 868

Redruth

Lowest Average Attendance — 207

Barking

== See also ==
- English Rugby Union Leagues
- English rugby union system
- Rugby union in England
