= Sylvan Edwards =

- Born: 14 December 1979 (age 46)

Rugby union career
- Position(s): Centre, Wing
Senior career
Years	Team	Apps	(Points)
?-02	Avonmouth Old Boys		
2002–12, 2016–	Dings Crusaders		
2012–15	Weston-super-Mare		

Sylvan Edwards (born 1979) is an English rugby union player who plays at either Centre or on the Wing. He is currently in his second spell with Bristol side Dings Crusaders where he became one of the top try scorers in National League 2 South history, with 69 tries in his first nine seasons spent at the club. Sylvan has also been capped by the Gloucestershire county side.

== Career ==
=== First Spell with Dings ===
After starting his career with Avonmouth Old Boys, Sylvan signed for fellow Bristol side, Dings Crusaders in 2002, and his debut season was a success as his club won South West Division 1 and gained promotion to the National Leagues. The 2003–04 season in National Division 3 South saw Ding's just avoid relegation, five points clear of 13th placed Basingstoke, with Sylvan contributing a respectable 10 tries in a Ding's side that were the lowest points scorers in the division. The next season was far better for both Sylvan and Dings as he scored a (tier 4) career best 17 tries in the league and his club finished 8th. Over the next couple of seasons Dings saw stability as they became a mid-table side in the division.

The 2008–09 season with Ding's was a lean one for Sylvan as he only managed 3 tries in a Ding's side that finished 6th. However, his overall contribution was good enough to see him picked for the Gloucestershire county side, with whom he reached the 2009 Bill Beaumont Cup final, making an appearance at Twickenham but ultimately ending on the wrong side of an 18–32 scoreline against winners Lancashire. In 2011 Sylvan was part of the Ding's squad that won the Bristol Combination Cup but it would be his last silverware at the club before his move to Weston-super-Mare for the 2012–13 season.

=== Weston-super-Mare ===
Sylvan had a decent debut season with new club Weston-super-Mare, scoring 7 tries from 21 appearances as his club finished 3rd in National League 3 South West, missing out on the promotion playoffs. Missing out on promotion was tempered somewhat as Weston-super-Mare won their 10th Somerset Cup, beating Old Redcliffians 33–32 in a very close match at the final held at Bath Road in Bridgwater. The next couple of seasons would see Weston's performances in the league start to slip and from chasing promotion in 2013, they were relegated to South West 1 West by the end of 2015.

=== Back with Dings ===
After suffering relegation with Weston-super-Mare, Sylvan resigned with former club, Dings Crusaders for the 2015–16 season, continuing to play in National League 3 South West as Dings had just been relegated from National League 2 South. Now aged 37 years he is playing in an ambitious Dings side that is looking to get promoted back to the National Leagues.

== Season-by-season playing stats ==
Season	Club	Competition	Appearances	Tries	Drop Goals	Conversions	Penalties	Total Points
2002–03	Dings Crusaders	South West Division 1	?	?	?	?	?	?
2003–04	Dings Crusaders	National Division 3 South	26	10	0	0	0	50
2003–04	Dings Crusaders	Powergen Cup	2	2	0	0	0	10
2004–05	Dings Crusaders	National Division 3 South	24	17	0	0	0	85
2004–05	Dings Crusaders	Powergen Cup	1	0	0	0	0	0
2005–06	Dings Crusaders	National Division 3 South	17	10	0	0	0	50
2005–06	Dings Crusaders	EDF Energy Trophy	1	0	0	0	0	0
2006–07	Dings Crusaders	National Division 3 South	25	9	0	0	0	45
2006–07	Dings Crusaders	EDF Energy Trophy	2	2	0	0	0	10
2007–08	Dings Crusaders	National Division 3 South	20	11	0	0	0	55
2007–08	Dings Crusaders	EDF Energy Trophy	1	0	0	0	0	0
2008–09	Dings Crusaders	National Division 3 South	19	3	0	0	0	15
2008–09	Dings Crusaders	EDF Energy Trophy	4	1	0	0	0	5
2009–10	Dings Crusaders	National League 2 South	19	4	0	0	0	20
2010–11	Dings Crusaders	National League 2 South	6	1	0	0	0	5
2011–12	Dings Crusaders	National League 2 South	21	4	0	1	0	22
2012–13	Weston-super-Mare	National League 3 South West	21	7	0	0	0	35
2012–13	Weston-super-Mare	Somerset Cup	2	2	0	0	0	10
2013–14	Weston-super-Mare	National League 3 South West	20	2	0	0	0	10
2014–15	Weston-super-Mare	National League 3 South West	?	?	?	?	?	?
2015–16	Dings Crusaders	National League 3 South West	?	?	?	?	?	?
2016–17	Dings Crusaders	National League 3 South West	6	3	0	0	0	15

== Honours and records ==
Dings Crusaders

- South West Division 1 champions: 2002–03
- Bristol Combination Cup winners: 2009

Weston-super-Mare

- Somerset Cup winners: 2013

Peter Spencer cup winner 2012 - 13

Gloucestershire

- Bill Beaumont Cup runner up: 2009
