= Mark Bedworth =

English rugby union player

- Born: 9 May 1982 (age 44) Durham, England
- School: Durham School
- University: York St John University

Rugby union career
- Position: Fly-half
Senior career
Years	Team	Apps	(Points)
2000-2005	Darlington Mowden Park		
2005-2010	Wharfedale	119	(1,127)
2010-2012	Westoe	40	(398)

Mark Bedworth, known locally as Bedders, is a rugby union Footballer who is currently player Coach at Westoe RFC. Mark Bedworth was born in Durham City in 1982 and attended Bow Preparatory School before moving onto Durham School where he is now a teacher of Physical Education. Having completed his A-levels, he continued to university in York. An excellent points kicker he became one of the all-time top scorers in National League 2 North and National League 1 with over 2,000 points scored between the two divisions.

== Rugby union career ==
Bedworth began his career at Darlington Mowden Park RFC at the age of 18 helping the club to win promotion to National Division Three North before moving on to play in National League 1 with Wharfedale at the start of the 2005–06 season. He scored more than 1,000 points for Wharfedale in over 100 games before moving to Westoe as a player coach in 2010 where he finished his career at the end of the 2011–12 season. Throughout his career Bedworth was a great kicker averaging over 200 points a season for the three north-east clubs he played for and is one of the top scorers of all time in. National League 1.

In a 10-year career he has represented England Counties XV in 2007 which included a tour of Russia where he scored one try. He also represented The full Barbarians XV twice and County Durham at County Level throughout his career.

== Season-by-season playing stats ==
Season	Club	Competition	Appearances	Tries	Drop Goals	Conversions	Penalties	Total Points
2000-01	Darlington Mowden Park	North Division 1	?	?	?	?	?	?
2001-02	Darlington Mowden Park	National Division 3 North	22	420	0	17	11	97
2002-03	Darlington Mowden Park	National Division 3 North	23	5	1	47	44	254
2002-03	Darlington Mowden Park	Powergen Cup	2	0	0	6	4	24
2003-04	Darlington Mowden Park	National Division 3 North	21	1	1	29	23	135
2003-04	Darlington Mowden Park	Powergen Cup	2	1	0	10	1	28
2004-05	Darlington Mowden Park	National Division 3 North	13	8	1	28	23	168
2004-05	Darlington Mowden Park	Powergen Cup	1	0	0	2	1	7
2005-06	Wharfedale	National Division 2	24	8	0	30	47	241
2005-06	Wharfedale	EDF Energy Trophy	2	1	0	3	5	26
2006-07	Wharfedale	National Division 2	20	13	1	36	23	209
2006-07	Wharfedale	EDF Energy Trophy	2	2	0	7	0	24
2007-08	Wharfedale	National Division 2	18	7	0	12	6	77
2008-09	Wharfedale	National Division 2	24	11	1	40	36	246
2008-09	Wharfedale	EDF Energy Trophy	1	0	0	1	4	14
2009-10	Wharfedale	National League 1	28	11	3	47	31	251
2010-11	Westoe	National League 2 North	28	12	3	71	20	271
2011-12	Westoe	National League 2 North	12	6	1	26	14	127

== Honours ==
Darlington Mowden Park

- North Division 1 champions: 2000-01

Wharfedale

- Yorkshire Cup winners: 2010-11

County/Representative

- Selected for Durham County
- Selected for England Counties XV: 2007, 2009
- Selected for Barbarians XV: 2007-09
