= Quentin King =

English rugby union player (1895–1954)

- Full name: Quentin Eric Moffitt Ayres King
- Born: 8 July 1895 Bedford, England
- Died: 30 October 1954 (aged 59) Birmingham, England

Rugby union career
- Position: Wing
International career
Years	Team	Apps	(Points)
1921	England	1	(3)

Quentin Eric Moffitt Ayres King (8 July 1895 – 30 October 1954) was an English international rugby union player.

Born in Bedford, King was capped once for England, after Edward Myers was a last minutes withdrawal from the 1921 Calcutta Cup match against Scotland at Inverleith. The team didn't have a travelling reserve and called upon King due to his close proximity to the venue. He played wing three-quarter in a 18–0 win for England.

King, a major, was an Army rugby player and heavyweight boxing champion.

== See also ==
- List of England national rugby union players
